= 1999–2000 Belarusian Cup =

Tournament details
- Country: Belarus
- Teams: 29

Final positions
- Champions: Slavia Mozyr (2nd title)
- Runners-up: Torpedo-MAZ Minsk

Tournament statistics
- Matches played: 28
- Goals scored: 92 (3.29 per match)
- Top goal scorer(s): Raman Vasilyuk, Valery Strypeykis (5 goals each)

The 1999–2000 Belarusian Cup was the ninth season of the Belarusian annual football cup competition. Contrary to the league season, this competition has been conducted in a fall-spring rhythm. The first games were played on 18 July 1999 and the final on 28 May 2000, which Slavia Mozyr won to claim their second title.

== Round of 32 ==
The games were played on 18 and 20 July 1999. Three Premier League clubs (Molodechno, Lida, Torpedo-MAZ Minsk) received a bye to the next round by drawing of lots.

| 18 July 1999 | Ozertsy Glubokoye (III) | 1–4 | Dinamo Minsk | Glubokoye |
| 17:00 | Boldyrev 11' | | Vostrykaw 64'; Lyadzyanyow 67', 88'; Trepachkin 89' | Stadium: City Stadium; Attendance: 3,000; Referee: Frants Letyago (Grodno) |

| 18 July 1999 | Torpedo Zhodino (II) | 0–3 | Neman-Belcard Grodno | Zhodino |
| 18:00 | | | Kirenya 40'; Mazurchik 44' (pen.); Boriseiko 72' | Stadium: Torpedo Stadium; Referee: Nikolay Metelskiy (Minsk) |

| 18 July 1999 | ZLiN Gomel (II) | 2–0 | Torpedo-Kadino Mogilev | Gomel |
| 18:00 | Volodkin 9'; Pokatashkin 34' | | | Stadium: Luch Stadium; Attendance: 1,200; Referee: Oleg Chikun (Stolbtsy) |

| 18 July 1999 | Rogachev (II) | 1–3 (a.e.t.) | Naftan-Devon Novopolotsk | Rogachev |
| 18:00 | Ivanow 38' | | Ignatyev 88'; Kozyak 109'; Demidchik 116' | Stadium: DYuSSh Stadium; Attendance: 2,500; Referee: Valeriy Petrovich (Minsk) |

| 18 July 1999 | Kommunalnik Slonim (II) | 0–7 | Gomel | Slonim |
| 18:00 | | | Mazur 4'; Bliznyuk 16', 21', 88'; Malyavko 64'; Patsko 82', 87' | Stadium: Yunost Stadium; Attendance: 3,000; Referee: Konstantin Daylid (Brest) |

| 18 July 1999 | Pinsk-900 (II) | 0–2 | Dinamo Brest | Pinsk |
| 18:00 | | | Prokopyuk 37'; Vasilyuk 82' | Stadium: Pripyat Stadium; Attendance: 1,500; Referee: Kazimir Znaydinsky (Grodno) |

| 18 July 1999 | Zabudova Chist (III) | 2–4 | Lokomotiv-96 Vitebsk | Chist |
| 18:00 | Rigorovich 26'; Volchek 88' | | Aleshchenko 25', 32'; Gormash 36'; Truhaw 53' | Stadium: Central Stadium; Attendance: 1,500; Referee: Gennady Yakubovsky (Minsk) |

| 18 July 1999 | Keramik Bereza (II) | 1–2 | Dnepr-Transmash Mogilev | Bereza |
| 18:00 | Zubach 31' | | Chumachenko 73'; Likhtarovich 84' | Stadium: City Stadium; Attendance: 3,500; Referee: Viktor Matyushev (Minsk) |

| 18 July 1999 | Vedrich-97 Rechitsa (II) | 1–1 (a.e.t.) (3–4 p) | Svisloch-Krovlya Osipovichi | Rechitsa |
| 18:00 | Ischenko 21' | | Samuschik 43' | Stadium: Rechitsadrev Stadium; Attendance: 3,000; Referee: Valeriy Yazevich (Lida) |
| | Penalties |
| | Fenin (penalty scored); Kalashnikaw (penalty scored); Jafarov (penalty scored); Panchenko (penalty missed); Ischenko (penalty missed); Bykaw (penalty missed) | | (penalty scored) Buloychyk; (penalty scored) Krot; (penalty scored) Porkulevich; (penalty missed) Vikhrov; (penalty missed) Veremeyko; (penalty scored) Shelest |

| 18 July 1999 | Granit Mikashevichi (II) | 2–0 | Shakhtyor Soligorsk | Mikashevichi |
| 18:00 | Pashkovets 43'; Nikitochkin 51' | | | Stadium: Granit Stadium; Attendance: 3,000; Referee: Aleksandr Chebykin (Minsk) |

| 18 July 1999 | Polesye Kozenki (II) | 0–6 | Belshina Bobruisk | Mozyr |
| 18:00 | | | Borisik 25', 87'; Khlebasolaw 43'; Khripach 57'; Mikhalev 78'; Timofeyev 89' | Stadium: Yunost Stadium; Attendance: 3,000; Referee: Valeriy Semyonov (Minsk) |

| 18 July 1999 | Neman Mosty (II) | 0–2 | Slavia Mozyr | Mosty |
| 19:00 | | | Denisyuk 62'; Sļesarčuks 90' | Stadium: Neman Stadium; Attendance: 2,000; Referee: Vladimir Sukhovarov (Orsha) |

| 20 July 1999 | Luninets (III) | 3–4 | BATE Borisov | Luninets |
| 18:00 | Bondaruk 61' (pen.); Shevchik 72'; Sinkovets 85' | | Tikhomirov 27' (pen.); Lisovskiy 36'; Niavinski 77'; Kutuzov 81' | Stadium: City Stadium; Attendance: 4,000; Referee: Aleksandr Ryomin (Minsk) |

== Round of 16 ==
The games were played on 1 and 17 October 1999.

| 1 October 1999 | Belshina Bobruisk | 3–1 | ZLiN Gomel (II) | Bobruisk |
| 15:00 | Mikhalev 23'; Ulezlo 41', 49' | | Pokatashkin 60' | Stadium: Spartak Stadium; Attendance: 2,500; Referee: Vadim Zhuk (Minsk) |

| 1 October 1999 | Lokomotiv-96 Vitebsk | 0–0 (a.e.t.) (4–3 p) | Dinamo Minsk | Orsha |
| 15:30 | | | | Stadium: City Stadium; Attendance: 1,800; Referee: Yuriy Maistrov (Fanipol) |
| | Penalties |
| | Konoplev (penalty scored); Gormash (penalty scored); Truhaw (penalty scored); Yeremeyev (penalty missed); Charnyshow (penalty scored) | | (penalty missed) Kavalchuk; (penalty scored) Hrapkowski; (penalty scored) Vyazhevich; (penalty scored) Osipovich; (penalty missed) Lyavonchyk |

| 1 October 1999 | Dinamo Brest | 1–0 | Dnepr-Transmash Mogilev | Brest |
| 16:00 | Vasilyuk 59' | | | Stadium: OSK Brestsky; Attendance: 1,500; Referee: Nikolay Metelskiy (Minsk) |

| 1 October 1999 | Neman-Belcard Grodno | 4–1 | Molodechno | Grodno |
| 16:00 | Mazurchik 54', 69' (pen.); Palyakow 60'; Traskevich 71' | | Kabelskiy 79' | Stadium: Neman Stadium; Attendance: 2,000; Referee: Bronislav Yasinskiy (Minsk) |

| 1 October 1999 | Svisloch-Krovlya Osipovichi | 1–3 | Torpedo-MAZ Minsk | Osipovichi |
| 16:00 | Litvinko 37' | | Yaromko 18'; Shvydakow 22'; Sednyov 80' | Stadium: Yunost Stadium; Attendance: 1,500; Referee: Frants Letyago (Grodno) |

| 1 October 1999 | Lida | 2–0 (a.e.t.) | Granit Mikashevichi (II) | Lida |
| | Poznyak 104'; Kotin 117' | | | Stadium: City Stadium; Attendance: Valeriy Semyonov (Minsk); Referee: 2,500 |

| 17 October 1999 | BATE Borisov | 0–1 | Gomel | Borisov |
| 15:00 | | | Demenkovets 83' | Stadium: City Stadium; Attendance: 4,000; Referee: Valeriy Semyonov (Minsk) |

| 17 October 1999 | Slavia Mozyr | 3–2 | Naftan-Devon Novopolotsk | Mozyr |
| 15:00 | Chaley 26'; Strypeykis 45', 69' | | Tarakanov 18'; Demidchik 67' | Stadium: Yunost Stadium; Attendance: 3,000; Referee: Viktor Matyushev (Minsk) |

== Quarterfinals ==
The games were played on 3 May 2000.

| 3 May 2000 | Dinamo Brest | 0–6 | Slavia Mozyr | Brest |
| 17:00 | | | Strypeykis 20', 33'; Vasilyuk 23', 43'; Matveychik 68'; Sļesarčuks 90' | Stadium: OSK Brestsky; Attendance: 2,500; Referee: Kazimir Znaydinsky (Grodno) |

| 3 May 2000 | Belshina Bobruisk | 2–1 | Lokomotiv-96 Vitebsk | Bobruisk |
| 17:00 | Balashow 59'; Karolik 69' | | Vekhtev 45' | Stadium: Spartak Stadium; Attendance: 3,500; Referee: Vadim Zhuk (Minsk) |

| 3 May 2000 | Torpedo-MAZ Minsk | 0–0 (a.e.t.) (4–2 p) | Neman-Belcard Grodno | Minsk |
| 17:00 | | | | Stadium: Torpedo Stadium; Attendance: 2,500; Referee: Oleg Chikun (Stolbtsy) |
| | Penalties |
| | Sednyov (penalty scored); Levitsky (penalty scored); Kukar (penalty scored); Kabelskiy (penalty scored) | | (penalty scored) Mazurchik; (penalty scored) Kirenya; (penalty missed) Davydov; (penalty missed) Nadziewski |

| 3 May 2000 | Gomel | 3–0 (a.e.t.) | Lida | Gomel |
| 17:30 | Kovalevich 93' (pen.); Afonasenko 102'; Bliznyuk 109' | | | Stadium: Luch Stadium; Attendance: 5,000; Referee: Valeriy Semyonov (Minsk) |

== Semifinals ==
The games were played on 19 and 20 May 2000.

| 19 May 2000 | Slavia Mozyr | 3–0 | Gomel | Mozyr |
| 17:00 | Denisyuk 13', 21', 54' | | | Stadium: Yunost Stadium; Attendance: 6,500; Referee: Gennady Yakubovsky (Minsk) |

| 20 May 2000 | Torpedo-MAZ Minsk | 1–0 | Belshina Bobruisk | Minsk |
| 17:00 | Levitsky 85' | | | Stadium: Torpedo Stadium; Attendance: 1,500; Referee: Vladimir Sukhovarov (Orsha) |

== Final ==
28 May 2000
17:00 UTC+3

| Torpedo-MAZ Minsk | 1–2 | Slavia Mozyr |
|---|---|---|
| Amelyanchuk 43' | Report | Strypeykis 77'; Vasilyuk 90' |

Dinamo Stadium, Minsk
Attendance: 4,000
Referee: Oleg Chikun (Stolbtsy)

TORPEDO-MAZ:
| GK | 1 | (Belarus) Vasil Khamutowski |
| SW | 2 | (Belarus) Aleksandr Sednyov |
| RB | 4 | (Belarus) Sergey Kabelskiy |
| LB | 3 | (Belarus) Syarhey Amelyanchuk |
| DM | 6 | (Belarus) Yury Maleyew (c) | | (substituted off) 76' |
| DM | 8 | (Belarus) Viktor Kukar |
| RM | 7 | (Belarus) Uladzimir Karytska |
| LM | 5 | (Belarus) Vasily Smirnykh | (yellow card) 85' |
| CAM | 9 | (Russia) Arkadiy Zenin | (yellow card) 18' | (substituted off) 46' |
| RF | 13 | (Belarus) Sergey Yaromko | (yellow card) 14' | (substituted off) 65' |
| LF | 11 | (Belarus) Aleksey Novitskiy |
Substitutes:
| GK | 16 | (Belarus) Andrey Svirkov |
| FW | 10 | (Belarus) Mikalay Shvydakow |
| MF | 12 | (Belarus) Roman Levitsky | | (substituted on) 46' |
| FW | 14 | (Romania) Laurențiu Lică | | (substituted on) 65' |
| DF | 15 | (Belarus) Yawhen Linyow | | (substituted on) 76' |
| DF | 17 | (Belarus) Alyaksey Pankavets |
| DF | 18 | (Belarus) Mikalay Branfilaw |
Manager:
(Belarus) Anatoliy Yurevich

SLAVIA:
| GK | 1 | (Belarus) Uladzimir Hayew |
| SW | 6 | (Russia) Oleg Samatov | (yellow card) 74' |
| RB | 5 | (Russia) Denis Pervushin | | (substituted off) 25' |
| LB | 2 | (Belarus) Igor Balin |
| CDM | 3 | (Belarus) Fedor Lukashenko | (yellow card) 58' |
| RM | 4 | (Ukraine) Oleksandr Shutov |
| CM | 8 | (Russia) Dmitri Karsakov (c) | | (substituted off) 57' |
| LM | 7 | (Belarus) Artur Matveychik |
| CAM | 9 | (Belarus) Dmitry Denisyuk | | (substituted off) 12' |
| RF | 11 | (Belarus) Valery Strypeykis |
| LF | 10 | (Belarus) Raman Vasilyuk | (yellow card) 90' |
Substitutes:
| GK | 16 | (Belarus) Syarhey Sinitsyn |
| MF | 12 | (Russia) Andrei Ilyaskin |
| FW | 13 | (Latvia) Igors Sļesarčuks |
| DF | 14 | (Belarus) Andrey Lukashevich | | (substituted on) 57' |
| DF | 15 | (Belarus) Valeriy Apanas | | (substituted on) 25' |
| MF | 17 | (Ukraine) Valeriy Vysokos |
| MF | 18 | (Belarus) Dzmitry Chaley | | (substituted on) 12' |
Manager:
(Russia) Aleksandr Kuznetsov
