= 1998 Belarusian Premier League =

Belarusian Premier League
- Season: 1998
- Champions: Dnepr-Transmash Mogilev
- Relegated: Kommunalnik Slonim; Dinamo-93 Minsk
- Champions League: Dnepr-Transmash Mogilev
- UEFA Cup: Belshina Bobruisk; BATE Borisov
- Intertoto Cup: Lokomotiv-96 Vitebsk; Gomel
- Matches: 225
- Goals: 587 (2.61 per match)
- Top goalscorer: Sergey Yaromko (19)
- Biggest home win: BATE 6–0 Dinamo Brest; Belshina 6–0 Naftan-Devon; Torpedo Minsk 6–0 Kommunalnik
- Biggest away win: Kommunalnik 0–5 Dnepr-Transmash; Dinamo Minsk 0–5 Dinamo Brest
- Highest scoring: Dinamo Brest 6–3 Molodechno

The 1998 Belarusian Premier League was the eighth season of top-tier football in Belarus. It started on April 12 and ended on October 31, 1998. Dinamo Minsk were the defending champions.

== Team changes from 1997 season ==
Two worst teams of the last season (Torpedo-Kadino Mogilev and Shakhtyor Soligorsk) relegated to the First League. They were replaced by two best clubs of 1996 First League (FC Gomel and BATE Borisov).

In the early days of January it was announced that Transmash Mogilev ceased to exist as an independent club merged with Dnepr Mogilev (with the latter being renamed to Dnepr-Transmash Mogilev). Ataka Minsk, who suffered heavy financial troubles, let go all their senior team players and failed to confirm their participation in the new season by a deadline in early March. A week later BFF announced that Ataka Minsk were excluded from the league and that two vacant places (left by Transmash and Ataka) are being filled by Torpedo-Kadino Mogilev and Shakhtyor Soligorsk, both of whom were spared from relegation.

Before the start of the season, MPKC Mozyr changed their name to Slavia Mozyr.

== Overview ==
Dnepr-Transmash Mogilev won their 1st champions title and qualified for the next season's Champions League. The championship runners-up BATE Borisov as well as bronze medalists and 1998–99 Cup winners Belshina Bobruisk qualified for UEFA Cup. Kommunalnik Slonim finished on last, 15th place and relegated to First League. Dinamo-93 Minsk dissolved and withdrew from the championship after 15 rounds. They were excluded from the final table and their results were annulled.

== Teams and venues ==
Location of teams in 1998 Belarusian Premier League

Team	Location	Venue	Capacity	Position in 1997
Dinamo Minsk	Minsk	Dinamo Stadium (Minsk)	40,000	1
Belshina	Bobruisk	Spartak Stadium (Bobruisk)	2,500	2
Lokomotiv-96	Vitebsk	Dinamo Stadium (Vitebsk)	5,500	3
Dnepr-Transmash	Mogilev	Spartak Stadium (Mogilev)	11,200	4
Dinamo-93	Minsk	Orbita Stadium	2,000	5
Slavia	Mozyr	Yunost Stadium (Mozyr)	6,500	6
Dinamo Brest	Brest	Dinamo Stadium (Brest)	3,000	7
Torpedo	Minsk	Torpedo Stadium (Minsk)	5,000	8
Naftan-Devon	Novopolotsk	Atlant Stadium	6,500	9
Neman	Grodno	Neman Stadium	15,000	10
Kommunalnik	Slonim	Yunost Stadium (Slonim)	2,000	11
Molodechno	Molodechno	City Stadium (Molodechno)	5,500	13
Torpedo-Kadino	Mogilev	Torpedo Stadium (Mogilev)	7,000	15
Shakhtyor	Soligorsk	Stroitel Stadium	5,000	16
Gomel	Gomel	Central Stadium	10,000	First league, 1
BATE	Borisov	City Stadium (Borisov)	3,500	First league, 2

1. Three games played at Orbita Stadium.
2. Last ten games played at City Stadium in Orsha, after club's own Dinamo Stadium was closed for renovation.
3. One game played at Khimvolokno Stadium.
4. Before club's withdrawal from the league, they played four games at Orbita Stadium, three games at Kamvolschik Stadium and one at GFC Smena.
5. First seven games played at Kamvolschik Stadium.
6. One game played at Khimvolokno Stadium.
7. One game played at Orbita Stadium in Minsk.

== Table ==
Pos	Team	Pld	W	D	L	GF	GA	GD	Pts	Qualification or relegation
1	Dnepr-Transmash Mogilev (C)	28	21	4	3	55	14	+41	67	Qualification for Champions League second qualifying round
2	BATE Borisov	28	18	4	6	50	25	+25	58	Qualification for UEFA Cup qualifying round (Note: Belshina Bobruisk qualified for the UEFA Cup qualifying round by winning the 1998–99 Belarusian Cup.)
3	Belshina Bobruisk	28	17	6	5	47	17	+30	57	Qualification for UEFA Cup qualifying round
4	Lokomotiv-96 Vitebsk	28	14	6	8	35	24	+11	48	Qualification for Intertoto Cup first round
5	Gomel	28	12	9	7	36	30	+6	45	Qualification for Intertoto Cup first round
6	Slavia Mozyr	28	12	9	7	41	36	+5	45	
7	Torpedo Minsk	28	12	8	8	44	22	+22	44	
8	Dinamo Minsk	28	11	6	11	39	38	+1	39	
9	Dinamo Brest	28	12	2	14	40	40	0	38	
10	Neman Grodno	28	8	7	13	27	44	−17	31	
11	Shakhtyor Soligorsk	28	8	6	14	33	54	−21	30	
12	Torpedo-Kadino Mogilev	28	7	8	13	30	40	−10	29	
13	Naftan-Devon Novopolotsk	28	7	4	17	33	47	−14	25	
14	Molodechno	28	4	4	20	21	51	−30	16	
15	Kommunalnik Slonim (R)	28	3	5	20	14	63	−49	14	Relegation to Belarusian First League
D	Dinamo-93 Minsk (Note: Dinamo-93 Minsk folded after 15 rounds, and their record was expunged.)	0	0	0	0	0	0	0	0	Club folded, record expunged

Source: rsssf.com
Rules for classification: 1st points; 2nd matches won; 3rd head-to-head
(C) Champions; (R) Relegated

== Results ==
Home \ Away	BAT	BSH	DBR	DMI	D93	DNE	GOM	KOM	LVI	MOL	NAF	NEM	SHA	SLA	TMI	TMO
BATE Borisov		1–0	6–0	3–0		1–0	1–1	1–0	1–3	3–0	2–1	3–0	2–0	2–0	0–1	4–1
Belshina Bobruisk	4–0		2–0	4–2		1–1	2–0	5–1	1–0	1–0	6–0	0–0	2–1	4–4	1–0	2–1
Dinamo Brest	0–3	0–3		0–1	3–1 (Note: Annulled after Dinamo-93 withdrew from competition.)	2–0	2–1	0–0	0–1	6–3	1–0	1–2	5–0	1–2	4–0	1–1
Dinamo Minsk	2–0	0–0	0–5			2–1	2–2	3–0	1–1	0–0	1–2	1–2	1–2	3–1	0–0	2–1
Dinamo-93 Minsk	1–1	0–0		5–1		0–4		1–1					3–1	4–0	0–0	
Dnepr-Transmash Mogilev	1–0	1–0	2–0	3–1			3–0	4–0	2–0	5–0	2–0	3–0	4–0	1–1	1–0	2–2
Gomel	0–0	1–0	1–0	4–3	1–2	1–2		2–1	3–0	1–0	2–0	2–0	2–1	0–0	2–1	0–0
Kommunalnik Slonim	1–3	1–1	1–0	1–0		0–5	0–3		2–3	3–1	0–0	1–2	0–0	0–2	0–0	0–2
Lokomotiv-96 Vitebsk	0–0	1–0	0–1	1–0	3–0 (Note: Originally awarded as a 3–0 win for Lokomotiv-96, after Dinamo-93 boycotted the game due to significant salary delays. Annulled after Dinamo-93 withdrew from competition.)	0–1	2–1	2–0		1–2	2–1	3–0	1–2	3–0	1–0	1–1
Molodechno	1–2	0–1	0–2	0–3	1–1	1–2	0–0	5–2	1–2		0–0	1–2	0–1	0–1	0–1	1–2
Naftan-Devon Novopolotsk	0–1	0–1	1–3	0–2	4–0	0–1	2–0	4–0	1–1	5–1		5–2	4–4	0–1	1–5	3–1
Neman Grodno	1–2	0–2	2–1	1–4	0–0	0–1	1–1	2–0	0–0	2–0	1–0		2–3	1–1	0–0	1–3
Shakhtyor Soligorsk	3–5	0–1	1–3	0–1		1–3	1–2	2–0	1–1	1–0	2–0	0–0		2–2	0–3	3–1
Slavia Mozyr	2–2	1–0	1–2	0–0		1–3	1–1	2–0	2–1	1–2	3–2	3–2	4–1		0–2	2–1
Torpedo Minsk	0–1	1–1	5–0	3–4		0–0	3–1	6–0	0–1	1–1	2–0	3–1	4–0	0–0		2–2
Torpedo-Kadino Mogilev	3–1	0–2	1–0	1–0	3–1	0–1	2–2	3–0	0–3	0–1	0–1	0–0	1–1	0–3	0–1	

Source: rsssf.com
Legend: Blue = home team win; Yellow = draw; Red = away team win.

== Belarusian clubs in European Cups ==
Round	Team #1	Agg.	Team #1	1st leg	2nd leg
1998 UEFA Intertoto Cup
First round	Dnepr-Transmash Mogilev (Belarus)	2–10	(Hungary) Debrecen	2–4	0–6
1998–99 UEFA Cup
First qualifying round	Belshina Bobruisk (Belarus)	1–3	(Bulgaria) CSKA Sofia	0–0	1–3
1998–99 UEFA Cup Winners' Cup
Qualifying round	Levski Sofia (Bulgaria)	9–2	(Belarus) Lokomotiv-96 Vitebsk	8–1	1–1
1998–99 UEFA Champions League
First qualifying round	Skonto Riga (Latvia)	2–1	(Belarus) Dinamo Minsk	0–0	2–1

== Top scorers ==
Rank	Name	Team	Goals
1	(Belarus) Sergey Yaromko	Torpedo Minsk	19
2	(Belarus) Valery Strypeykis	Naftan-Devon Novopolotsk	18
2	(Belarus) Raman Vasilyuk	Dinamo Brest	18
4	(Belarus) Pavel Shavrov	Dinamo-93 Minsk / Shakhtyor Soligorsk	15
5	(Belarus) Dzmitry Balashow	Belshina Bobruisk	14
6	(Belarus) Dzmitry Aharodnik	Dnepr-Transmash Mogilev	13
7	(Belarus) Ihor Chumachenko	Dnepr-Transmash Mogilev	10
8	(Belarus) Alyaksandr Baranaw	BATE Borisov	9
8	(Belarus) Sergey Vekhtev	Lokomotiv-96 Vitebsk	9
8	(Belarus) Dmitry Denisyuk	Slavia Mozyr	9
8	(Belarus) Yawhen Kazlow	Dnepr-Transmash Mogilev	9
8	(Belarus) Oleg Kononov	Torpedo Minsk	9

== See also ==
- 1998 Belarusian First League
- 1997–98 Belarusian Cup
- 1998–99 Belarusian Cup
