= 1999 Belarusian Premier League =

Belarusian Premier League
- Season: 1999
- Champions: BATE
- Relegated: Svisloch-Krovlya; Molodechno
- Champions League: BATE
- UEFA Cup: Slavia; Gomel
- Intertoto Cup: Dnepr-Transmash
- Matches: 240
- Goals: 732 (3.05 per match)
- Top goalscorer: (Belarus) Valery Strypeykis (21)
- Biggest home win: Dinamo Minsk 7–0 Svisloch-Krovlya; Dinamo Brest 7–0 Molodechno; Shakhtyor 8–1 Svisloch-Krovlya
- Biggest away win: Lida 0–7 Slavia
- Highest scoring: Shakhtyor 8–1 Svisloch-Krovlya; Dinamo Brest 2–7 Slavia

The 1999 Belarusian Premier League was the ninth season of top-tier football in Belarus. It started on April 11 and ended on October 30, 1999. Dnepr-Transmash Mogilev were the defending champions.

== Team changes from 1998 season ==
Dinamo-93 Minsk dissolved midway through 1998 season and FC Kommunalnik Slonim relegated to the First League after finishing in the last place. They were replaced by 1998 First League winners Lida, who previously played in Premier League as Obuvshchik Lida, and the newcomers Svisloch-Krovlya Osipovichi, First League runners-up. Torpedo Minsk changed their name to Torpedo-MAZ Minsk and Neman Grodno were renamed to Neman-Belcard Grodno.

== Overview ==
BATE Borisov won their 1st champions title and qualified for the next season's Champions League. The championship runners-up and 1999–2000 Cup winners Slavia Mozyr as well as bronze medalists Gomel qualified for UEFA Cup. Newcomers Svisloch-Krovlya Osipovichi finished their first and the only season in top league in 15th place and relegated, as did 16th team Molodechno.

== Teams and venues ==
Location of teams in 1999 Belarusian Premier League

Team	Location	Venue	Capacity	Position in 1998
Dnepr-Transmash	Mogilev	Spartak Stadium (Mogilev)	11,200	1
BATE	Borisov	City Stadium (Borisov)	3,500	2
Belshina	Bobruisk	Spartak Stadium (Bobruisk)	2,500	3
Lokomotiv-96	Vitebsk	City Stadium (Orsha)	2,100	4
Gomel	Gomel	Central Stadium (Gomel)	10,000	5
Slavia	Mozyr	Yunost Stadium (Mozyr)	6,500	6
Torpedo-MAZ	Minsk	Torpedo Stadium (Minsk)	6,200	7
Dinamo Minsk	Minsk	Dinamo Stadium (Minsk)	41,040	8
Dinamo Brest	Brest	OSK Brestsky	3,000	9
Neman-Belcard	Grodno	Neman Stadium	14,000	10
Shakhtyor	Soligorsk	Stroitel Stadium	5,000	11
Torpedo-Kadino	Mogilev	Torpedo Stadium (Mogilev)	7,000	12
Naftan-Devon	Novopolotsk	Atlant Stadium	6,500	13
Molodechno	Molodechno	City Stadium (Molodechno)	5,500	14
Lida	Lida	City Stadium (Lida)	3,000	First league, 1
Svisloch-Krovlya	Osipovichi	Yunost Stadium (Osipovichi)	2,000	First league, 2

1. As club's own Dinamo Stadium was closed for renovation, they played most of the games at City Stadium in Orsha. In addition, one game was played at City Stadium in Luzhesno and two games at Spartak Stadium in Mogilev.
2. One game played at Kamvolschik Stadium.

== Table ==
Pos	Team	Pld	W	D	L	GF	GA	GD	Pts	Qualification or relegation
1	BATE Borisov (C)	30	24	5	1	80	22	+58	77	Qualification for Champions League first qualifying round
2	Slavia Mozyr	30	20	5	5	74	25	+49	65	Qualification for UEFA Cup qualifying round (Note: Slavia Mozyr qualified for the UEFA Cup qualifying round by winning the 1999–2000 Belarusian Cup.)
3	Gomel	30	19	6	5	57	28	+29	63	Qualification for UEFA Cup qualifying round
4	Dnepr-Transmash Mogilev	30	17	9	4	53	27	+26	60	Qualification for Intertoto Cup first round
5	Shakhtyor Soligorsk	30	18	5	7	58	30	+28	59	
6	Dinamo Minsk	30	14	9	7	51	30	+21	51	
7	Dinamo Brest	30	14	4	12	59	52	+7	46	
8	Belshina Bobruisk	30	13	6	11	52	42	+10	45	
9	Neman-Belcard Grodno	30	10	7	13	36	43	−7	37	
10	Torpedo-MAZ Minsk	30	10	5	15	31	47	−16	35	
11	Lokomotiv-96 Vitebsk	30	9	7	14	40	45	−5	34	
12	Naftan-Devon Novopolotsk	30	8	4	18	39	63	−24	28	
13	Lida	30	7	4	19	27	64	−37	25	
14	Torpedo-Kadino Mogilev	30	6	5	19	30	69	−39	23	
15	Svisloch-Krovlya Osipovichi (R)	30	4	4	22	24	74	−50	16	Relegation to Belarusian First League
16	Molodechno (R)	30	2	5	23	21	71	−50	11	Relegation to Belarusian First League

Source: rsssf.com
Rules for classification: 1st points; 2nd matches won; 3rd head-to-head
(C) Champions; (R) Relegated

== Results ==
Home \ Away	BAT	BSH	DBR	DMI	DNE	GOM	LID	LVI	MOL	NAF	NEM	SHA	SLA	SKO	TMO	TMI
BATE Borisov		3–1	3–1	2–0	1–1	3–1	1–1	3–2	2–1	7–1	4–1	2–1	1–1	2–0	4–0	2–1
Belshina Bobruisk	0–3		4–1	1–1	0–1	0–0	4–1	4–0	3–0	2–2	5–1	3–3	0–0	1–1	5–1	2–1
Dinamo Brest	2–4	2–0		2–1	1–1	1–2	1–0	3–0	7–0	3–2	1–1	1–1	2–7	2–0	4–0	2–1
Dinamo Minsk	1–0	2–1	3–2		2–1	3–4	5–0	4–0	2–0	2–1	1–1	0–0	0–0	7–0	1–1	5–0
Dnepr-Transmash Mogilev	0–0	3–0	4–1	2–1		2–1	3–1	1–0	1–1	0–2	1–1	3–1	3–0	3–1	5–2	1–0
Gomel	2–2	2–3	3–1	0–1	1–1		3–0	2–0	3–1	2–0	2–0	1–0	1–0	4–1	5–0	1–0
Lida	0–4	5–1	0–3	2–1	0–0	1–4		0–0	1–0	1–0	0–3	1–2	0–7	0–2	3–1	0–1
Lokomotiv-96 Vitebsk	0–1	1–2	0–1	1–0	1–1	2–0	1–1		1–2	2–0	1–1	1–1	0–4	6–1	4–1	2–0
Molodechno	0–3	1–2	0–3	1–2	1–1	0–1	0–2	1–4		1–3	1–1	0–1	2–5	1–2	0–5	2–2
Naftan-Devon Novopolotsk	0–4	1–2	0–5	1–1	1–2	1–2	4–1	3–1	1–2		3–1	0–2	0–3	2–1	2–0	4–0
Neman-Belcard Grodno	1–2	1–0	2–1	0–0	0–2	0–2	4–2	2–1	0–0	4–0		0–2	2–3	2–0	3–0	1–0
Shakhtyor Soligorsk	0–1	2–1	7–1	0–1	1–0	2–2	4–1	0–2	3–1	5–2	3–0		2–1	8–1	1–0	1–0
Slavia Mozyr	1–3	1–0	2–1	4–0	4–0	1–1	3–0	3–0	1–0	2–0	3–1	0–2		2–1	5–0	2–0
Svisloch-Krovlya Osipovichi	0–5	0–1	1–3	0–0	0–2	1–3	0–3	2–2	3–0	1–1	0–1	0–1	2–3		3–2	0–2
Torpedo-Kadino Mogilev	1–5	0–3	1–1	2–2	2–5	0–1	1–0	0–4	4–1	2–0	1–0	0–1	0–0	3–0		0–1
Torpedo-MAZ Minsk	1–3	2–1	2–0	1–2	0–3	1–1	1–0	1–1	2–1	2–2	2–1	4–1	1–6	2–0	0–0	

Source: rsssf.com
Legend: Blue = home team win; Yellow = draw; Red = away team win.

== Belarusian clubs in European Cups ==
Round	Team #1	Agg.	Team #1	1st leg	2nd leg
1999 UEFA Intertoto Cup
First round	Lokomotiv-96 Vitebsk (Belarus)	3–4	(Croatia) NK Varteks	1–2	2–2
First round	Hradec Králové (Czech Republic)	1–1 (p)	(Belarus) Gomel	1–0	0–1 (aet, p.1–3)
Second round	Hammarby (Sweden)	6–2	(Belarus) Gomel	4–0	2–2
1999–2000 UEFA Cup
Qualifying round	Belshina Bobruisk (Belarus)	1–8	(Cyprus) Omonia Nicosia	1–5	0–3
Qualifying round	BATE Borisov (Belarus)	1–12	(Russia) Lokomotiv Moscow	1–7	0–5
1999–2000 UEFA Champions League
Second qualifying round	Dnepr-Transmash Mogilev (Belarus)	0–3	(Sweden) AIK	0–1	0–2

== Top scorers ==
Rank	Name	Team	Goals
1	(Belarus) Valery Strypeykis	Slavia Mozyr	21
2	(Belarus) Vitali Kutuzov	BATE Borisov	19
3	(Belarus) Vitaliy Aleshchenko	Lokomotiv-96 Vitebsk	18
4	(Belarus) Raman Vasilyuk	Dinamo Brest	17
5	(Belarus) Aleksandr Vyazhevich	Dinamo Minsk	15
6	(Belarus) Dmitry Podrez	Shakhtyor Soligorsk	13
7	(Belarus) Viktor Borel	Gomel	12
7	(Belarus) Dzmitry Chaley	Slavia Mozyr	12
9	(Belarus) Dzmitry Aharodnik	Dnepr-Transmash Mogilev	11
9	(Belarus) Dmitry Bespansky	Shakhtyor Soligorsk	11
9	(Belarus) Dmitry Denisyuk	Slavia Mozyr	11

== See also ==
- 1999 Belarusian First League
- 1998–99 Belarusian Cup
- 1999–2000 Belarusian Cup
