= 1998–99 Belarusian Cup =

Tournament details
- Country: Belarus
- Teams: 32

Final positions
- Champions: Belshina Bobruisk (2nd title)
- Runners-up: Slavia Mozyr

Tournament statistics
- Matches played: 31
- Goals scored: 93 (3 per match)
- Top goal scorer(s): Dmitri Karsakov; Vitali Kutuzov; Sergei Sergel; Alexandr Vyazhevich (4 goals each)

The 1998–99 Belarusian Cup was the eighth season of the annual Belarusian football cup competition. Contrary to the league season, the competition has been conducted in a fall-spring rhythm. It began on 18 July 1998 with the first of five rounds and ended on 29 May 1999 with the final at the Dinamo Stadium in Minsk.

Lokomotiv-96 Vitebsk were the defending champions, having defeated FC Dinamo Minsk in the 1998 final, but were knocked out in the second round by the eventual champions FC Belshina Bobruisk.

FC Belshina Bobruisk won the final against FC Slavia Mozyr after the penalty shootout to win their second title.

== Round of 32 ==
The games were played on 18 July 1998. Lokomotiv-96 Vitebsk began the defence of their title with a 4–0 win against FC Veino. Belshina Bobruisk won 3–0 against Svisloch-Krovlya Osipovichi and BATE Borisov recorded the biggest win of the round after defeating Vedrich-97 Rechitsa 9–0.

Team 1	Score	Team 2
Svisloch-Krovlya Osipovichi (II)	0–3	Belshina Bobruisk
Dinamo-Energogaz Vitebsk (II)	3–3 (a.e.t.) (3–4 p)	Naftan-Devon Novopolotsk
Polesye Mozyr Raion (II)	0–1	Torpedo Minsk
Rogachev (II)	0–1 (a.e.t.)	Gomel
Kommunalnik Svetlogorsk (II)	0–0 (a.e.t.) (4–3 p)	Kommunalnik Slonim
Vedrich-97 Rechitsa (II)	0–9	BATE Borisov
ZLiN Gomel (II)	0–4	Dnepr-Transmash Mogilev
Veras Nesvizh (III)	0–2	Slavia Mozyr
Torpedo Zhodino (II)	2–3	Dinamo Minsk
Belcard Grodno (II)	0–3	Torpedo-Kadino Mogilev
Lida (II)	0–1	Molodechno
Neman Grodno	2–1 (a.e.t.)	Bereza (II)
Dinamo-93 Minsk	2–2 (a.e.t.) (4–5 p)	Zvezda-VA-BGU Minsk (III)
Pinsk-900 (II)	1–2	Shakhtyor Soligorsk
FC Veino (II)	0–4	Lokomotiv-96 Vitebsk
Dinamo-Juni Minsk (II)	0–1	Dinamo Brest

== Round of 16 ==
The games were played on 23 September 1998. Defending champions Lokomotiv-96 Vitebsk lost 3–0 to Belshina Bobruisk and BATE Borisov again recorded the biggest win of the round after defeating Zvezda-VA-BGU Minsk 7–1.

Team 1	Score	Team 2
BATE Borisov	7–1	Zvezda-VA-BGU Minsk (III)
Torpedo Minsk	2–1	Kommunalnik Svetlogorsk (II)
Torpedo-Kadino Mogilev	0–2	Neman Grodno
Dnepr-Transmash Mogilev	2–0	Naftan-Devon Novopolotsk
Dinamo Brest	0–2	Gomel
Belshina Bobruisk	3–0	Lokomotiv-96 Vitebsk
Molodechno	1–1 (a.e.t.) (8–7 p)	Shakhtyor Soligorsk
Dinamo Minsk	2–4	Slavia Mozyr

== Quarterfinals ==
The games were played on 29 April 1999. BATE Borisov defeated Dnepr-Transmash Mogilev 2–1, Slavia Mozyr defeated Gomel 1–0, Torpedo-MAZ Minsk won 3–1 against Molodechno and Belshina Bobruisk recorded a 1–0 win against Neman-Belcard Grodno.

29 April 1999	BATE Borisov	2–1	Dnepr-Transmash Mogilev	Borisov
17:00	Klimovich 15' (o.g.); Doroshkevich 67'		Aharodnik 12'	Stadium: City Stadium; Attendance: 6,000; Referee: Sergey Shmolik (Brest)

29 April 1999	Gomel	0–1	Slavia Mozyr	Gomel
17:00			Strypeykis 41'	Stadium: Central Stadium; Attendance: 10,000; Referee: Vadim Zhuk (Minsk)

29 April 1999	Molodechno	1–3	Torpedo-MAZ Minsk	Molodechno
17:00	Yawseenka 52'		Yaromko 3'; Shvydakow 46'; Kononov 72'	Stadium: City Stadium; Attendance: 3,000; Referee: Frants Letyago (Grodno)

29 April 1999	Neman-Belcard Grodno	0–1	Belshina Bobruisk	Grodno
17:30			Gamanovich 81'	Stadium: Neman Stadium; Attendance: 3,000; Referee: Oleg Chikun (Stolbtsy)

== Semifinals ==
The games were played on 11 May 1999. Belshina Bobruisk advanced to the final with a 1–0 win against Torpedo-MAZ Minsk while Slavia Mozyr defeated BATE Borisov 2–1.

11 May 1999	Belshina Bobruisk	1–0	Torpedo-MAZ Minsk	Bobruisk
17:00	Borisik 68'			Stadium: Spartak Stadium; Attendance: 3,500; Referee: Sergey Shmolik (Brest)

11 May 1999	Slavia Mozyr	2–1	BATE Borisov	Mozyr
17:30	Malyukov 33'; Matveychik 46'		Tikhomirov 67'	Stadium: Yunost Stadium; Attendance: 8,500; Referee: Gennady Yakubovsky (Minsk)

== Final ==
The final match was played on 29 May 1999 at the Dinamo Stadium in Minsk. After a 1–1, Belshina Bobruisk won the cup 4–2 on penalties.

29 May 1999
17:00 UTC+3

Belshina Bobruisk	1–1 (a.e.t.)	Slavia Mozyr
Hlebasolaw 9'		Strypeykis 48'
Penalties
Razumovich (penalty scored); Timofeev (penalty scored); Mikhalev (penalty scored); Turchinovich (penalty scored)	4–2	(penalty scored) Strypeykis; (penalty missed) Samatov; (penalty scored) Danilyuk; (penalty missed) Kushnir

Dinamo Stadium, Minsk
Attendance: 5,000
Referee: Vadim Zhuk (Minsk)

BELSHINA:
GK	1	(Belarus) Sergey Shalay		(substituted off) 45'
SW	4	(Belarus) Igor Shustikov	(yellow card) 12'
RB	2	(Belarus) Sergey Razumovich	(yellow card) 59'
CB	3	(Russia) Yevgeni Timofeev	(yellow card) 44'
LB	8	(Belarus) Andrei Khripach		(substituted off) 74'
DM	6	(Belarus) Igor Gradoboyev (c)
RM	5	(Belarus) Vyacheslav Banul		(substituted off) 53'
LM	7	(Belarus) Eduard Gradoboyev
CAM	9	(Belarus) Aleksandr Borisik
FW	10	(Belarus) Andrey Khlebasolaw
FW	11	(Belarus) Andrey Turchinovich
Substitutes:
GK	16	(Belarus) Sergey Zhemchugov		(substituted on) 45'
MF	12	(Belarus) Vitaliy Gamanovich		(substituted on) 53'
MF	13	(Belarus) Vitaly Mikhalev		(substituted on) 74'
DF	14	(Belarus) Igor Kovalevich
FW	15	(Belarus) Sergey Ulezlo
DF	17	(Belarus) Vasiliy Smirnykh
MF	18	(Belarus) Dmitriy Migas
Manager:
(Belarus) Ivan Savostikov

SLAVIA:
GK	1	(Belarus) Syarhey Sinitsyn
RB	5	(Russia) Oleg Malyukov		(substituted off) 31'
CB	4	(Belarus) Valeriy Apanas
LB	2	(Belarus) Igor Balin
DM	3	(Belarus) Fedor Lukashenko	(yellow card) 100'
DM	9	(Russia) Oleg Samatov
RM	7	(Belarus) Yury Antanovich	(yellow card) 48'	(substituted off) 70'
CM	8	(Russia) Dmitri Karsakov (c)
CM	6	(Belarus) Dzmitry Chaley		(substituted off) 46'
LM	10	(Belarus) Artur Matveychik
FW	11	(Belarus) Valery Strypeykis
Substitutes:
GK	16	(Belarus) Uladzimir Hayew
DF	12	(Belarus) Mikhail Vavilov
FW	13	(Latvia) Igors Sļesarčuks
MF	14	(Belarus) Dmitry Denisyuk		(substituted on) 46'
FW	15	(Belarus) Vasiliy Kushnir		(substituted on) 70'
DF	17	(Belarus) Ruslan Danilyuk		(substituted on) 31'
MF	18	(Belarus) Maksim Sukhoveyev
Manager:
(Russia) Aleksandr Kuznetsov
