= 2000 Belarusian Premier League =

Belarusian Premier League
- Season: 2000
- Champions: Slavia
- Relegated: Lida; Torpedo-Kadino; Kommunalnik
- Champions League: Slavia
- UEFA Cup: Belshina; BATE; Shakhtyor
- Intertoto Cup: Dinamo Minsk
- Matches: 240
- Goals: 673 (2.8 per match)
- Top goalscorer: (Belarus) Raman Vasilyuk (31)
- Biggest home win: Neman-Belcard 8–0 Kommunalnik; BATE 8–0 Naftan-Devon
- Biggest away win: Naftan-Devon 0–7 BATE
- Highest scoring: Belshina 3–6 Slavia; Torpedo-Kadino 2–7 Gomel

The 2000 Belarusian Premier League was the tenth season of top-tier football in Belarus. It started on April 15 and ended on November 4, 2000. BATE Borisov were the defending champions.

== Team changes from 1999 season ==
Svisloch-Krovlya Osipovichi and Molodechno, who finished 15th and 16th respectively, relegated to the First League. They were replaced by 1999 First League winners Kommunalnik Slonim and runners-up Vedrich-97 Rechytsa, who previously played in top league as Vedrich Rechytsa.

== Overview ==
Slavia Mozyr won their 2nd champions title and qualified for the next season's Champions League. The championship runners-up BATE Borisov, 1999–2000 Cup winners Belshina Bobruisk and UEFA Fair Play ranking winners Shakhtyor Soligorsk qualified for UEFA Cup. Due to Premiere League reduction from 16 to 14 teams starting with next season, three lowest placed teams were relegated: Lida, Torpedo-Kadino Mogilev and Kommunalnik Slonim. As of 2010, this was the last season in top league for either relegated team.

== Teams and venues ==
Location of teams in 2000 Belarusian Premier League

Team	Location	Venue	Capacity	Position in 1999
BATE	Borisov	City Stadium (Borisov)	5,500	1
Slavia	Mozyr	Yunost Stadium (Mozyr)	5,300	2
Gomel	Gomel	Luch Stadium	5,000	3
Dnepr-Transmash	Mogilev	Spartak Stadium (Mogilev)	6,000	4
Shakhtyor	Soligorsk	Stroitel Stadium	5,000	5
Dinamo Minsk	Minsk	Dinamo Stadium (Minsk)	40,000	6
Dinamo Brest	Brest	OSK Brestsky	3,000	7
Belshina	Bobruisk	Spartak Stadium (Bobruisk)	2,000	8
Neman-Belcard	Grodno	Neman Stadium	14,000	9
Torpedo-MAZ	Minsk	Torpedo Stadium (Minsk)	6,200	10
Lokomotiv-96	Vitebsk	Lyos Stadium (Baran)	3,000	11
Naftan-Devon	Novopolotsk	Atlant Stadium	6,500	12
Lida	Lida	City Stadium (Lida)	3,000	13
Torpedo-Kadino	Mogilev	Torpedo Stadium (Mogilev)	7,000	14
Kommunalnik	Slonim	Dinamo Stadium (Slonim)	1,200	First league, 1
Vedrich-97	Rechitsa	Rechitsadrev Stadium	5,500	First league, 2

1. Gomel spent the season at Luch Stadium, as their regular stadium Central Stadium was closed for renovation.
2. One game played at Khimvolokno Stadium.
3. Two games played at Traktor Stadium.
4. As club's own Dinamo Stadium was closed for renovation, they played most of the games at Lyos Stadium in Baran. In addition, one game was played at Spartak Stadium in Bobruisk.
5. Kommunalnik played all games at Dinamo Stadium, as their regular stadium Yunost was closed for renovation.

== Table ==
Pos	Team	Pld	W	D	L	GF	GA	GD	Pts	Qualification or relegation
1	Slavia Mozyr (C)	30	23	5	2	78	25	+53	74	Qualification for Champions League first qualifying round
2	BATE Borisov	30	20	4	6	68	26	+42	64	Qualification for UEFA Cup qualifying round
3	Dinamo Minsk	30	19	5	6	49	21	+28	62	Qualification for Intertoto Cup first round
4	Neman-Belcard Grodno	30	17	6	7	56	29	+27	57	
5	Shakhtyor Soligorsk	30	15	9	6	47	29	+18	54	Qualification for UEFA Cup qualifying round (Note: Shakhtyor Soligorsk qualified for the UEFA Cup qualifying round through the UEFA Fair Play ranking award.)
6	Gomel	30	17	2	11	50	41	+9	53	
7	Dnepr-Transmash Mogilev	30	14	7	9	55	33	+22	49	
8	Torpedo-MAZ Minsk	30	13	10	7	43	28	+15	49	
9	Belshina Bobruisk	30	11	5	14	42	38	+4	38	Qualification for UEFA Cup qualifying round (Note: Belshina Bobruisk qualified for the UEFA Cup qualifying round by winning the 2000–01 Belarusian Cup.)
10	Dinamo Brest	30	10	4	16	37	51	−14	34	
11	Lokomotiv-96 Vitebsk	30	8	7	15	34	50	−16	31	
12	Vedrich-97 Rechitsa	30	6	11	13	23	36	−13	29	
13	Naftan-Devon Novopolotsk	30	5	7	18	25	69	−44	22	
14	Lida (R)	30	3	10	17	16	60	−44	19	Relegation to Belarusian First League
15	Torpedo-Kadino Mogilev (R)	30	5	2	23	31	71	−40	17	Relegation to Belarusian First League
16	Kommunalnik Slonim (R)	30	3	8	19	19	66	−47	17	Relegation to Belarusian First League

Source: rsssf.com
Rules for classification: 1st points; 2nd matches won; 3rd head-to-head
(C) Champions; (R) Relegated

== Results ==
Home \ Away	BAT	BSH	DBR	DMI	DNE	GOM	KOM	LID	LVI	NAF	NEM	SLA	SHA	TMO	TMI	VED
BATE Borisov		1–0	1–0	3–1	3–1	2–0	6–0	5–0	1–0	8–0	3–0	1–3	4–1	4–0	0–0	2–1
Belshina Bobruisk	1–1		3–1	1–3	3–1	0–2	4–0	3–0	0–2	1–3	1–1	3–6	5–2	1–0	0–1	0–0
Dinamo Brest	0–1	1–3		1–2	1–6	2–1	5–2	0–0	3–1	2–3	1–0	1–3	0–1	3–0	1–1	1–0
Dinamo Minsk	0–0	1–0	4–0		2–1	3–1	4–1	4–0	2–2	2–0	3–0	0–1	0–1	2–1	0–0	1–2
Dnepr-Transmash Mogilev	1–2	1–0	3–0	0–1		3–1	2–0	6–0	3–0	2–0	1–1	0–1	0–1	3–1	1–1	1–1
Gomel	3–1	1–0	3–2	0–2	0–1		0–0	2–1	2–1	3–0	0–1	1–0	2–1	2–2	1–0	3–0
Kommunalnik Slonim	1–3	1–1	1–2	0–1	1–1	1–2		3–0	0–1	2–1	1–1	2–2	1–1	0–4	0–0	1–3
Lida	2–1	0–1	0–1	0–4	0–0	0–3	0–0		2–2	0–0	0–0	1–3	0–3	3–0	0–2	1–1
Lokomotiv-96 Vitebsk	0–0	0–3	3–2	2–1	1–2	0–2	0–1	2–1		3–1	2–3	1–2	0–1	2–0	2–2	3–1
Naftan-Devon Novopolotsk	0–7	1–1	1–2	1–1	0–4	1–2	2–0	0–0	0–0		1–3	1–4	0–0	1–0	0–3	1–1
Neman-Belcard Grodno	3–0	1–0	3–1	0–0	3–0	3–1	8–0	0–0	3–0	6–2		1–2	3–0	4–2	2–1	1–0
Slavia Mozyr	2–0	3–2	3–1	0–1	4–1	3–2	5–0	5–0	4–1	5–0	2–0		1–0	4–2	1–1	3–0
Shakhtyor Soligorsk	3–1	1–0	0–0	2–0	2–2	4–0	2–0	2–2	4–0	2–0	0–1	2–2		1–0	2–0	0–0
Torpedo-Kadino Mogilev	1–3	0–2	0–2	0–1	0–4	2–7	1–0	2–0	3–2	1–3	3–4	0–4	1–4		0–1	0–0
Torpedo-MAZ Minsk	0–1	3–1	2–1	1–2	1–2	4–0	3–0	4–1	1–1	3–2	1–0	0–0	3–3	1–4		1–0
Vedrich-97 Rechitsa	2–3	0–2	0–0	0–1	2–2	1–3	1–0	1–2	0–0	1–0	1–0	0–0	1–1	3–1	0–2	

Source: rsssf.com
Legend: Blue = home team win; Yellow = draw; Red = away team win.

== Belarusian clubs in European Cups ==
Round	Team #1	Agg.	Team #1	1st leg	2nd leg
2000 UEFA Intertoto Cup
First round	Dnepr-Transmash Mogilev (Belarus)	4–2	(Denmark) Silkeborg	2–1	2–1
Second round	Chmel Blšany (Czech Republic)	8–2	(Belarus) Dnepr-Transmash Mogilev	6–2	2–0
2000–01 UEFA Cup
Qualifying round	Slavia Mozyr (Belarus)	1–1 (a)	(Israel) Maccabi Haifa	1–1	0–0
Qualifying round	AIK (Sweden)	3–0	(Belarus) Gomel	1–0	2–0
2000–01 UEFA Champions League
First qualifying round	Shirak Gyumri (Armenia)	2–3	(Belarus) BATE Borisov	1–1	1–2
Second qualifying round	Helsingborg (Sweden)	3–0	(Belarus) BATE Borisov	0–0	3–0

== Top scorers ==
Rank	Name	Team	Goals
1	(Belarus) Raman Vasilyuk	Slavia Mozyr	31
2	(Russia) Sergei Davydov	Neman-Belcard Grodno	18
2	(Belarus) Vitali Kutuzov	BATE Borisov	18
4	(Belarus) Valery Strypeykis	Slavia Mozyr	14
5	(Belarus) Dzmitry Aharodnik	Dnepr-Transmash Mogilev	13
6	(Belarus) Vitaliy Aleshchenko	Gomel	12
7	(Russia) Sergey Polyakov	Neman-Belcard Grodno	11
7	(Belarus) Leanid Lahun	BATE Borisov	11
9	(Belarus) Syarhey Nikifarenka	Shakhtyor Soligorsk	11
9	(Belarus) Vadim Skripchenko	BATE Borisov	11
9	(Belarus) Igor Trukhov	Lokomotiv-96 Vitebsk	11

== See also ==
- 2000 Belarusian First League
- 1999–2000 Belarusian Cup
- 2000–01 Belarusian Cup
