= 1996 Belarusian Premier League =

Belarusian Premier League
- Season: 1996
- Champions: MPKC Mozyr (1st title)
- Relegated: Obuvshchik Lida; Vedrich Rechitsa
- Champions League: MPKC Mozyr
- Cup Winners' Cup: Belshina Bobruisk
- UEFA Cup: Dinamo Minsk
- Intertoto Cup: Dinamo-93 Minsk
- Matches: 240
- Goals: 647 (2.7 per match)
- Top goalscorer: (Belarus) Andrey Khlebasolaw (34 goals)
- Biggest home win: Dinamo Br 7–0 Torpedo-Kadino (19 June); Belshina 7–0 Vedrich (11 August)
- Biggest away win: Vedrich 0–6 Torpedo Mn (28 October)
- Highest scoring: MPKC 7–1 Torpedo-Kadino (27 July)

The 1996 Belarusian Premier League was the sixth season of top-tier football in Belarus. It started on 16 April and ended on 10 November 1996. Dinamo Minsk were the defending champions.

== Team changes from 1995 season ==
Bobruisk, who finished in the last place, have relegated and immediately dissolved after 1995 season. They were replaced by the newcomers Naftan-Devon Novopolotsk, who won the First League in 1995.

Dvina Vitebsk changed their name to Lokomotiv-96 Vitebsk and Shinnik Bobruisk were renamed to Belshina Bobruisk. Torpedo Mogilev changed name to Torpedo-Kadino Mogilev in the middle of the season (in September).

== Overview ==
The championship was played as a double round-robin tournament in the summer season of 1996. MPKC Mozyr won the champions title for the 1st time while spending only two seasons in Premier League and qualified for the next season's Champions League. The championship runners-up Dinamo Minsk qualified for UEFA Cup. Bronze medalists and 1996–97 Cup winners Belshina Bobruisk qualified for the Cup Winners' Cup. Obuvshchik Lida and Vedrich Rechitsa, placed 15th and 16th respectively, relegated to the First League.

== Teams and venues ==
Location of teams in 1996 Belarusian Premier League

Team	Location	Venue	Capacity	Position in 1995
Dinamo Minsk	Minsk	Dinamo Stadium (Minsk)	50,050	1
MPKC Mozyr	Mozyr	Yunost Stadium (Mozyr)	7,500	2
Dinamo-93 Minsk	Minsk	Traktor Stadium	25,000	3
Ataka-Aura Minsk	Minsk	Traktor Stadium	25,000	4
Molodechno	Molodechno	City Stadium	5,600	5
Dnepr Mogilev	Mogilev	Spartak Stadium (Mogilev)	12,000	6
Lokomotiv-96 Vitebsk	Vitebsk	Dinamo Stadium (Vitebsk)	5,500	7
Neman Grodno	Grodno	Neman Stadium	14,000	8
Torpedo Minsk	Minsk	Torpedo Stadium (Minsk)	5,000	9
Dinamo Brest	Brest	Dinamo Stadium (Brest)	5,400	10
Torpedo-Kadino Mogilev	Mogilev	Torpedo Stadium (Mogilev)	6,000	11
Obuvshchik Lida	Lida	Obuvshchik Stadium	3,000	12
Shakhtyor Soligorsk	Soligorsk	Stroitel Stadium	5,000	13
Vedrich Rechitsa	Rechytsa	Central Stadium	5,500	14
Belshina Bobruisk	Bobruisk	Spartak Stadium (Bobruisk)	4,800	15
Naftan-Devon Novopolotsk	Novopolotsk	Atlant Stadium	6,500	First league, 1

1. One game played at City Stadium in Lyuban, two games at Traktor Stadium.
2. Two games played at Kamvolschik Stadium, one game at Dinamo Stadium.
3. Two games played at Dinamo Stadium.
4. Ten games played at Khimvolokno Stadium due to renovation works at Spartak Stadium
5. One game played at City Stadium in Shumilino.
6. Two games played at Shakhtyor Stadium.

== Table ==
Pos	Team	Pld	W	D	L	GF	GA	GD	Pts	Qualification or relegation
1	MPKC Mozyr (C)	30	24	4	2	64	17	+47	76	Qualification for Champions League first qualifying round
2	Dinamo Minsk	30	23	6	1	83	20	+63	75	Qualification for UEFA Cup first qualifying round
3	Belshina Bobruisk	30	20	3	7	67	32	+35	63	Qualification for Cup Winners' Cup qualifying round
4	Dinamo-93 Minsk	30	17	5	8	44	30	+14	56	Qualification for Intertoto Cup group stage
5	Lokomotiv-96 Vitebsk	30	13	10	7	48	27	+21	49	
6	Ataka-Aura Minsk	30	13	5	12	31	42	−11	44	
7	Naftan-Devon Novopolotsk	30	13	4	13	43	52	−9	43	
8	Molodechno	30	11	8	11	42	33	+9	41	
9	Dnepr Mogilev	30	11	6	13	33	36	−3	39	
10	Dinamo Brest	30	7	11	12	39	43	−4	32	
11	Shakhtyor Soligorsk	30	8	5	17	29	50	−21	29	
12	Torpedo Minsk	30	7	8	15	32	53	−21	29	
13	Neman Grodno	30	7	8	15	25	48	−23	29	
14	Torpedo-Kadino Mogilev	30	7	6	17	27	64	−37	27	
15	Obuvshchik Lida (R)	30	6	6	18	26	43	−17	24	Relegation to Belarusian First League
16	Vedrich Rechitsa (R)	30	4	3	23	14	57	−43	15	Relegation to Belarusian First League

Source: rsssf.com
Rules for classification: 1st points; 2nd matches won; 3rd head-to-head
(C) Champions; (R) Relegated

== Results ==
Home \ Away	ATA	BSH	DBR	DMI	D93	DNE	LVI	MOL	MPK	NAF	NEM	OBU	SHA	TMI	TMO	VED
Ataka-Aura Minsk		0–2	1–2	0–5	1–3	0–2	1–0	2–1	1–1	0–0	1–1	2–1	3–0	2–1	2–1	1–0
Belshina Bobruisk	3–0		4–0	0–2	3–1	3–1	1–0	1–1	1–2	4–1	3–1	2–1	3–0	3–1	6–0	7–0
Dinamo Brest	1–2	0–0		1–2	1–3	0–1	3–3	1–1	1–2	3–0	1–2	2–0	4–1	1–1	7–0	1–0
Dinamo Minsk	4–1	4–0	2–2		6–0	2–2	1–1	1–0	1–0	6–0	5–1	4–0	2–0	5–0	1–0	1–0
Dinamo-93 Minsk	3–0	1–0	0–0	2–1		0–0	1–5	1–1	1–2	4–1	3–0	1–0	2–1	1–0	3–0	2–3
Dnepr Mogilev	0–1	3–0	3–1	1–1	0–1		1–2	1–3	0–4	1–2	3–0	1–1	0–0	0–1	2–1	2–1
Lokomotiv-96 Vitebsk	1–1	0–1	1–1	1–1	0–0	1–2		2–0	0–2	2–0	2–2	1–1	3–2	2–0	3–0	3–1
Molodechno	1–2	0–0	1–1	2–4	0–1	3–0	0–4		1–2	3–1	4–0	1–0	2–1	4–1	5–0	2–0
MPKC Mozyr	1–0	5–1	4–0	1–1	0–2	2–0	2–0	2–1		3–1	1–0	1–0	3–0	1–0	7–1	3–1
Naftan-Devon Novopolotsk	3–1	2–1	1–1	1–4	1–2	2–1	1–1	2–3	0–3		4–0	2–0	1–0	1–1	3–2	4–0
Neman Grodno	0–1	0–3	1–0	2–3	1–0	2–1	0–1	0–0	0–1	0–3		1–1	2–2	0–0	3–1	2–0
Obuvshchik Lida	0–1	1–2	4–0	1–2	1–0	0–2	2–0	0–1	1–3	1–3	1–1		0–0	3–0	2–0	0–1
Shakhtyor Soligorsk	3–2	1–2	2–1	1–5	0–1	0–1	0–4	0–0	0–2	0–1	1–0	4–0		3–1	2–1	1–0
Torpedo Minsk	2–1	2–3	1–3	0–5	2–1	0–0	0–0	2–1	1–1	3–0	0–0	1–3	2–2		0–1	2–1
Torpedo-Kadino Mogilev	0–0	1–6	0–0	0–1	0–0	2–1	0–2	0–0	1–1	2–1	2–1	4–1	1–0	5–1		1–1
Vedrich Rechitsa	0–1	1–2	0–0	0–1	0–4	0–1	0–3	1–0	0–2	0–1	0–2	0–0	1–2	0–6	2–0	

Source: rsssf.com
Legend: Blue = home team win; Yellow = draw; Red = away team win.

== Belarusian clubs in European Cups ==
Round	Team #1	Agg.	Team #1	1st leg	2nd leg
1996 UEFA Intertoto Cup
Group stage	Ataka-Aura Minsk (Belarus)	0–4	(Russia) Rotor Volgograd	0–4	
Group stage	Shakhtar Donetsk (Ukraine)	1–2	(Belarus) Ataka-Aura Minsk	1–2	
Group stage	Ataka-Aura Minsk (Belarus)	0–3	(Turkey) Antalyaspor	0–3	
Group stage	Basel (Switzerland)	5–0	(Belarus) Ataka-Aura Minsk	5–0	
1996–97 UEFA Cup
Preliminary round	Dinamo-93 Minsk (Belarus)	4–2	(Moldova) Tiligul Tiraspol	3–1	1–1
Preliminary round	Bohemians (Republic of Ireland)	1–1 (a)	(Belarus) Dinamo Minsk	1–1	0–0
Qualifying round	Helsingborg (Sweden)	4–1	(Belarus) Dinamo-93 Minsk	1–1	3–0
Qualifying round	Dinamo Minsk (Belarus)	2–3	(Turkey) Beşiktaş	2–1	0–2
1996–97 UEFA Cup Winners' Cup
Qualifying round	MPKC Mozyr (Belarus)	2–3	(Iceland) KR Reykjavik	2–2	0–1

== Top scorers ==
Rank	Name	Team	Goals
1	(Belarus) Andrey Khlebasolaw	Belshina Bobruisk	34
2	(Belarus) Uladzimir Makowski	Dinamo Minsk	23
3	(Belarus) Alyaksandr Vyazhevich	Molodechno	20
4	(Belarus) Sergey Yaromko	MPKC Mozyr	14
5	(Belarus) Alyaksandr Kulchy	MPKC Mozyr	13
6	(Belarus) Vitaliy Kirilko	Dinamo Brest	12
6	(Russia) Vladimir Solodukhin	Dnepr Mogilev	12
8	(Ukraine) Ruslan Lyashenko	Naftan-Devon Novopolotsk	11
8	(Belarus) Vladimir Putrash	Belshina Bobruisk	11
10	(Belarus) Aleksandr Volovik	Torpedo Minsk	10

== See also ==
- 1996 Belarusian First League
- 1995–96 Belarusian Cup
- 1996–97 Belarusian Cup
