= Yury Maleyew =

Belarusian footballer (born 1968)

Personal information
- Full name: Yury Ivanavich Maleyew
- Date of birth: 20 March 1968 (age 58)
- Place of birth: Bykhaw, Belarusian SSR
- Height: 1.72 m (5 ft 8 in)
- Position: Midfielder

Team information
- Current team: Dinamo Minsk (women) & Belarus (women)

Senior career*
Years	Team	Apps	(Gls)
1985	Dnepr Mogilev	9	(1)
1986–1988	Dinamo Minsk	0	(0)
1988	Dinamo Brest	26	(3)
1989–1991	Dnepr Mogilev	88	(13)
1991–1994	Zawisza Bydgoszcz	78	(12)
1995–1996	Ataka Minsk	13	(0)
1996–1998	Slavia Mozyr	50	(7)
1999–2000	Torpedo-MAZ Minsk	47	(2)
2001–2003	Torpedo Zhodino	74	(13)

International career
1995–1996	Belarus	9	(0)

Managerial career
- 2003–2004: Torpedo Zhodino (assistant)
- 2004–2006: Torpedo Zhodino
- 2006: Lokomotiv Minsk
- 2009–2010: Belarus U17
- 2010–2013: Slavia Mozyr
- 2014–2015: Minsk (assistant)
- 2016–2018: Minsk (women)
- 2019–: Belarus (women)
- 2020–: Dinamo Minsk (women)
- * Club domestic league appearances and goals

Yury Ivanavich Maleyew (Belarusian: Юрый Іванавіч Малееў, Russian: Юрий Иванович Малеев; born 20 March 1968) is a Belarusian professional football manager and former player. He is currently in charge of Dinamo Minsk's women's team and the Belarus women's national team.

== Playing career ==
Maleyew was born in Bykhaw. He played for Dnepr Mogilev and Torpedo Zhodino in the Belarusian Premier League and Zawisza Bydgoszcz in the Polish Ekstraklasa. He also made nine appearances for the Belarus national team.

== Honours ==
MPKC Mozyr

- Belarusian Premier League: 1996
- Belarusian Cup: 1995–96
