= Leanid Lahun =

Belarusian footballer and coach

Personal information
- Full name: Leanid Leanidovich Lahun
- Date of birth: 22 June 1978 (age 48)
- Place of birth: Minsk, Belarusian SSR
- Height: 1.85 m (6 ft 1 in)
- Position: Midfielder

Youth career
- Torpedo Minsk

Senior career*
Years	Team	Apps	(Gls)
1994–1995	Smena Minsk	22	(3)
1996	Zvezda Minsk	26	(17)
1997–2001	BATE Borisov	72	(19)
1997–1999	→ Smena-BATE Minsk	51	(16)
2001–2002	Torpedo Moscow	4	(0)
2003	Tom Tomsk	33	(4)
2004	SKA-Energiya Khabarovsk	31	(1)
2005	Shakhtyor Soligorsk	1	(0)
2006	Dynamo Bryansk	11	(0)
2007	Vitebsk	1	(0)
2009	Rudensk	20	(2)

Managerial career
- 2017: Neman-Agro Stolbtsy
- 2018: Torpedo Minsk
- 2019–2020: Slonim-2017
- 2022: Rogachev
- 2023–: Naftan Novopolotsk (reserves)
- * Club domestic league appearances and goals

Leanid Leanidovich Lahun (Belarusian: Леанід Леанідавіч Лагун; Russian: Леонид Леонидович Лагун; born 22 June 1978) is a Belarusian football coach and former player.

== Honours ==
BATE Borisov

- Belarusian Premier League champion: 1999

Shakhtyor Soligorsk

- Belarusian Premier League champion: 2005
