= Dzmitry Chaley =

Belarusian footballer

Personal information
- Full name: Dzmitry Alyaksandrovich Chaley
- Date of birth: 14 February 1978 (age 48)
- Place of birth: Minsk
- Height: 1.76 m (5 ft 9 in)
- Position: Midfielder

Team information
- Current team: Dinamo Minsk (youth coach)

Senior career*
Years	Team	Apps	(Gls)
1997	Molodechno	24	(0)
1998	Dinamo-93 Minsk	12	(1)
1998–2001	Slavia Mozyr	84	(19)
2001–2002	Ružomberok	5	(1)
2002	Rostselmash Rostov-on-Don	2	(0)
2003	Torpedo-SKA Minsk	29	(2)
2004–2006	Dinamo Minsk	59	(4)
2007–2008	Shakhtyor Soligorsk	20	(2)
2009	Granit Mikashevichi	23	(2)
2010	Vitebsk	16	(0)
2012–2014	Gorodeya	76	(4)

International career
1998–1999	Belarus U21	9	(0)
- * Club domestic league appearances and goals as of 1 December 2014

Dzmitry Alyaksandrovich Chaley (Belarusian: Дзьмітры Аляксандровіч Чалей; Russian: Дмитрий Александрович Чалей; born 14 February 1978) is a retired Belarusian professional footballer. After retiring, he worked as a youth coach.

== Career ==
In 2001, Chaley left Slavia Mozyr for Ružomberok in Slovakia. In 2004, he said that "What caught my eye [in Slovakia] was the abundance of tough game - the fight on the field was conducted until the last second of the match. To master after the “Slavia”, where they practiced technical, combination football, was not easy. In principle, the level of the Slovak championship is low. I'm sure that “Slavia” could claim medals in it."

== Honours ==
Slavia Mozyr

- Belarusian Premier League champion: 2000
- Belarusian Cup winner: 1999–2000

Dinamo Minsk

- Belarusian Premier League champion: 2004
