= Doroshkevich =

Doroshkevich (Russian: Дорошкевич) is a gender-neutral Slavic surname. It may refer to

- Andrei Doroshkevich (born 1937), Russian theoretical astrophysicist and cosmologist
- Yury Doroshkevich (born 1978), Belarusian football coach and former player
