= Fedor Lukashenko =

Belarusian footballer

Personal information
- Date of birth: 18 March 1974 (age 52)
- Place of birth: Minsk
- Position: Midfielder

Senior career*
| Years | Team | Apps | (Gls) |
| 1992 | Niva Samokhvalovichi | 1 | (0) |
| 1992–1996 | Molodechno | 114 | (6) |
| 1997–1998 | Dinamo-93 Minsk | 41 | (2) |
| 1998–2001 | Slavia Mozyr | 92 | (10) |
| 2002–2004 | Gomel | 70 | (2) |
| 2005 | Darida Minsk Raion | 11 | (1) |
| 2005–2006 | Dinamo Brest | 21 | (1) |
| 2007–2010 | Veras Nesvizh | 100 | (3) |
| 2011 | SKVICH Minsk | 17 | (0) |

International career
| 1993 | Belarus U21 | 1 | (0) |
| 1997 | Belarus | 1 | (0) |
- * Club domestic league appearances and goals

Fedor Lukashenko (Russian: Фёдор Лукашенко; born 18 March 1974) is a retired Belarusian professional football player. He has made one appearance for Belarus national football team in 1997.

== Honours ==
Slavia Mozyr

- Belarusian Premier League champion: 2000
- Belarusian Cup winner: 1999–2000

Gomel

- Belarusian Premier League champion: 2003
- Belarusian Cup winner: 2001–02
