= Matveychik =

Matveychik Matveichik (Russian: Матвейчик) is a Russian-language surname derived from the given name Matvey (Matthew). Belarusian variant: Matsveychyk, Ukrainian: Matveychyk. Notable people with the surname include:

- Artur Matveychik, Belarusian footballer
- Sergey Matveychik, Belarusian footballer
