= Mikalay Branfilaw =

Belarusian footballer

Personal information
- Date of birth: 16 December 1977 (age 48)
- Place of birth: Minsk, Soviet Union
- Height: 1.90 m (6 ft 3 in)
- Position: Defender

Team information
- Current team: Energetik-BGU Minsk (assistant coach)

Senior career*
Years	Team	Apps	(Gls)
1994–1995	Smena Minsk	20	(0)
1996–1997	BATE Borisov	34	(2)
1998–1999	Smena Minsk	39	(8)
2000–2002	Torpedo-MAZ Minsk	37	(0)
2003–2004	Wisła Płock	27	(1)
2005	Radomiak Radom	34	(3)
2006	Podbeskidzie Bielsko-Biała	16	(2)
2006	Torpedo Zhodino	10	(0)
2007	FC Gomel	12	(0)
2007–2008	Shakhtyor Soligorsk	37	(4)
2009	Torpedo Zhodino	11	(0)
2010–2012	Belshina Bobruisk	77	(7)
2013	Naftan Novopolotsk	11	(0)

International career
2004	Belarus	2	(0)

Managerial career
- 2014–2015: Torpedo Minsk
- 2016: Kletsk
- 2017: Osipovichi
- 2017–2018: Energetik-BGU Minsk (assistant)
- 2019: Granit Mikashevichi
- 2020–2021: Orsha
- 2022–: Energetik-BGU Minsk (assistant)
- * Club domestic league appearances and goals

Mikalay Mikalayevich Branfilaw (Belarusian: Мікалай Мікалаевіч Бранфілаў, Russian: Николай Николаевич Бранфилов; born 16 December 1977) is a Belarusian professional football manager and former player who is the current assistant coach of Energetik-BGU Minsk.

== Career ==
=== Club career ===
In his career he has played for clubs in Belarus and Poland, including Wisła Płock, Radomiak Radom, FC Gomel and BATE Borisov.

=== International career ===
Branfilaw was capped twice for the Belarus national team. He played in a friendlies against Romania and Latvia in 2004.

=== Coaching career ===
In 2014, Branfilaw was named the new coach of Torpedo Minsk.
