= Yury Doroshkevich =

Belarusian footballer and coach

Personal information
- Date of birth: 30 June 1978 (age 48)
- Place of birth: Minsk
- Height: 1.79 m (5 ft 10 in)
- Position: Midfielder

Senior career*
Years	Team	Apps	(Gls)
1993–1997	Ataka Minsk	93	(8)
1998–2000	BATE Borisov	51	(12)
2000	Luninets	15	(3)
2001–2005	Torpedo Zhodino	82	(9)
2005–2006	Smorgon	18	(1)
2006	Belshina Bobruisk	12	(0)

International career
1998–1999	Belarus U21	3	(1)
1996	Belarus	1	(0)

Managerial career
- 2012–: BATE Borisov (youth)
- * Club domestic league appearances and goals

Yury Doroshkevich (Russian: Юрий Дорошкевич; born 30 June 1978) is a Belarusian professional football coach and former player. As of 2013, he works as a youth coach at BATE Borisov.

== Honours ==
BATE Borisov

- Belarusian Premier League champion: 1999
