= Artur Matveychik =

Belarusian footballer (born 1974)

Personal information
- Full name: Artur Borisovich Matveychik
- Date of birth: 15 October 1974 (age 52)
- Place of birth: Minsk, Belarusian SSR
- Height: 1.82 m (6 ft 0 in)
- Positions: Defender; midfielder

Senior career*
Years	Team	Apps	(Gls)
1993–1994	Fandok-2 Bobruisk		
1994	Shinnik Bobruisk	5	(0)
1994–1995	Bobruisk	6	(1)
1995–1997	Naftan-Devon Novopolotsk	63	(2)
1998–2001	Slavia Mozyr	106	(6)
2002	Volgar-Gazprom Astrakhan	6	(0)
2002	Torpedo Zhodino	9	(0)
2003	MTZ-RIPO Minsk	28	(1)
2004	Kryvbas Kryvyi Rih	2	(0)
2004	→ Kryvbas-2 Kryvyi Rih	3	(0)
2004–2005	Naftan Novopolotsk	31	(3)
2006	Belshina Bobruisk	20	(0)
2014	Krumkachy Minsk	10	(0)

International career
2001	Belarus B	1	(0)
- * Club domestic league appearances and goals

Artur Borisovich Matveychik (Russian: Артур Матвейчик; born 15 October 1974) is a Belarusian former footballer.

== Early life ==
Matveychik was born in 1974 in Minsk, Belarus. He started playing football in 1981.

== Career ==
Matveychik started his career with Belarusian side Fandok Bobruisk. In 1994, he signed for Belarusian side Shinnik. After that, he signed for Belarusian side Naftan. In 1998, he signed for Belarusian side Slavia. He helped the club win the league. In 2002, he signed for Russian side Volgar. After that, he signed for Belarusian side Torpedo-BelAZ. In 2003, he signed for Belarusian side Partizan. In 2004, he signed for Ukrainian side Kryvbas. After that, he returned to Belarusian side Naftan. In 2006, he returned to Belarusian side Belshina. In 2014, he signed for Belarusian side Krumkachy Minsk. He was described as "one of the leaders" of the club.

=== Honours ===
Slavia Mozyr

- Belarusian Premier League: 2000
- Belarusian Cup: 2000
