= Sergey Yaromko =

Belarusian footballer and coach

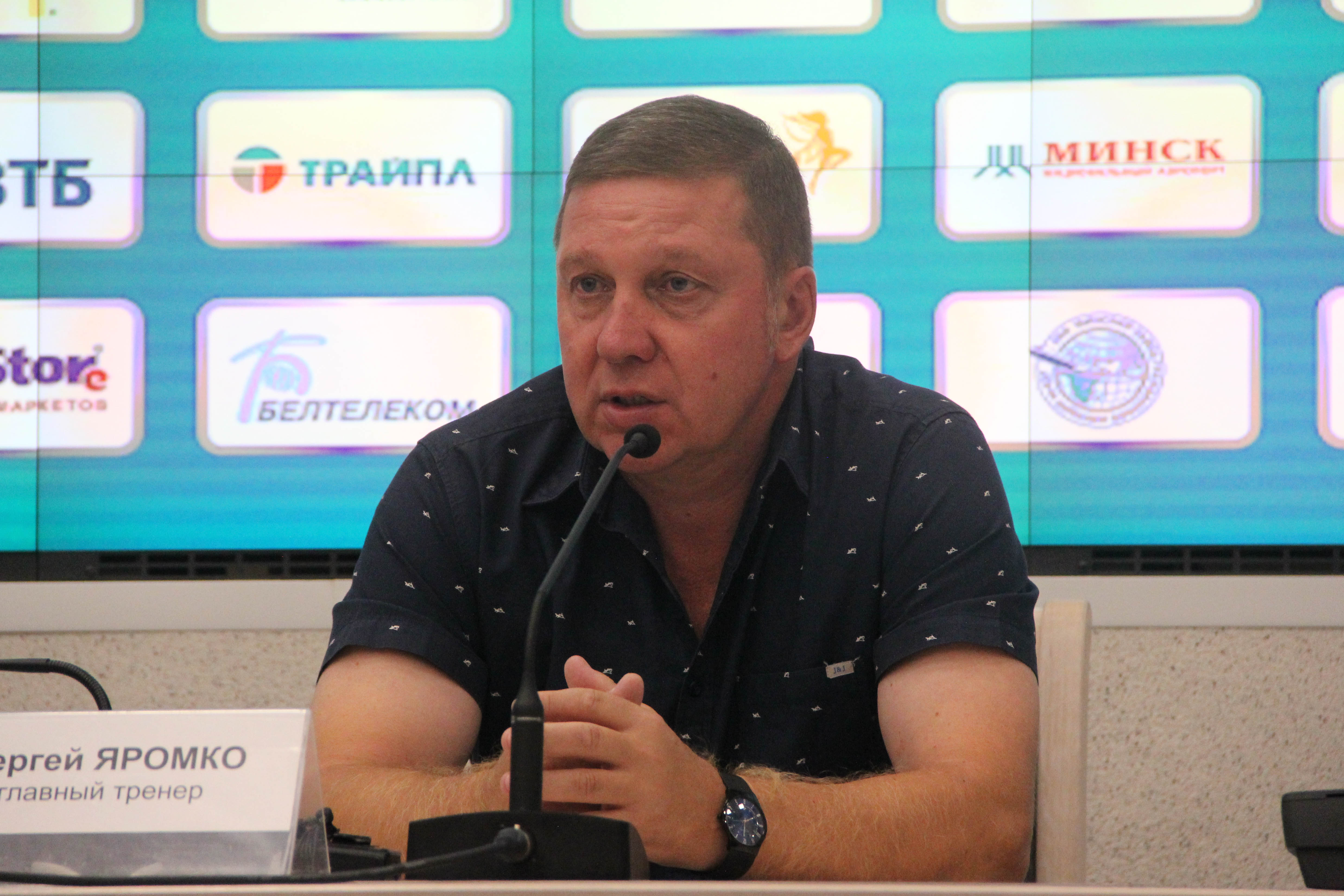
- Sergey Yaromko at a press conference in 2018

Personal information
- Full name: Sergey Valeryevich Yaromko
- Date of birth: 7 April 1967 (age 59)
- Place of birth: Minsk, Belarusian SSR
- Position: Forward

Youth career
- 1984–1985: Dinamo Minsk

Senior career*
Years	Team	Apps	(Gls)
1985–1988	Burevestnik Minsk		
1989–1990	Meliorator Chimkent	70	(24)
1991	Alga Frunze	24	(5)
1992	Metal Kluczbork		
1993	Shinnik Bobruisk	25	(9)
1993–1994	Fandok Bobruisk	29	(24)
1995–1996	MPKC Mozyr	53	(31)
1997–2000	Torpedo-MAZ Minsk	103	(39)
2001	SKAF Minsk	14	(4)
Total		318	(136)

International career
1994	Belarus	1	(0)

Managerial career
- 2001: SKAF Minsk
- 2005: Smena Minsk
- 2005–2009: Minsk
- 2010: Dinamo Minsk (assistant)
- 2011: SKVICH Minsk
- 2012: Belshina Bobruisk
- 2012–2013: Irtysh Pavlodar (assistant)
- 2014–2019: Gorodeya
- 2019–2020: Belarus U21
- 2022–2023: Minsk
- 2024: Belarus U21
- * Club domestic league appearances and goals

Sergey Yaromko (Belarusian: Сяргей Яромка (Syarhey Yaromka); Russian: Серге́й Яромко; born 7 April 1967) is a former Belarusian footballer (forward) and currently a coach. From June 2019 till December 2020 he was a head coach for Belarus national under-21 football team.

== Playing career ==
In his early career Yaromko played in Belarusian SSR league for Burevestnik Minsk, before leaving to play a few seasons in Central Asia and Poland.

He returned to Belarus in 1993 and immediately became one of the most prolific strikers of Belarusian Premier League. He scored 103 goals in 184 games between 1993 and 2000 and became a league top scorer twice (in 1995 and 1998). Despite this, he didn't have much of a career in Belarus national team, for which he only played once (friendly match against Poland in 1994).

He spent his last season before retirement in 2001 as a player-manager for SKAF Minsk in the Second League

== Honours ==
MPKC Mozyr

- Belarusian Premier League champion: 1996
- Belarusian Cup winner: 1995–96

Individual

- Belarusian Premier League top scorer: 1995, 1998

== Manager career ==
After one season with SKAF Minsk, Yaromko spent next few years studying for a manager. In 2005, he managed Smena Minsk and at the end of the year was appointed as a head coach of a new club FC Minsk, which took over Smena license. He left Minsk in 2009, after which he worked in Dinamo Minsk and SKVICH Minsk.
