= Vital Nadziewski =

Belarusian footballer

Personal information
- Date of birth: 20 October 1981 (age 45)
- Place of birth: Grodno, Soviet Union
- Height: 1.75 m (5 ft 9 in)
- Positions: Midfielder; left back

Team information
- Current team: Neman Grodno (coach)

Youth career
- 1997–1998: Neman Grodno

Senior career*
Years	Team	Apps	(Gls)
1998–2005	Neman Grodno	139	(3)
2006–2008	Gomel	53	(3)
2008–2011	Neman Grodno	83	(3)
2012–2013	Olimpia Elbląg	39	(2)
2013	Lida	12	(1)

International career
2001–2004	Belarus U21	14	(0)

Managerial career
- 2014–: Neman Grodno (coach)
- * Club domestic league appearances and goals as of 3 January 2014

Vital Nadziewski (Belarusian: Віталь Надзіеўскі; Russian: Виталий Надиевский; born 20 October 1981) is a retired Belarusian professional footballer. His latest club was Lida in 2013.
