= Andrey Khlebasolaw =

Belarusian footballer and coach

Personal information
- Date of birth: 22 November 1965 (age 60)
- Place of birth: Baranovichi, Brest Oblast, Byelorussian SSR, Soviet Union
- Height: 1.75 m (5 ft 9 in)
- Position: Forward

Senior career*
Years	Team	Apps	(Gls)
1987	Tekstilschik Baranovichi	14	(5)
1988–1991	Dinamo Brest	140	(36)
1992	Wisła Kraków	12	(0)
1993	Spartak Anapa	6	(2)
1993–1995	FC Bobruisk	23	(4)
1995	Krylia Sovetov Samara	11	(0)
1996–1999	Belshina Bobruisk	101	(69)
Total		307	(116)

International career
1996–1997	Belarus	6	(0)

Managerial career
- 2000: Belshina Bobruisk (interim)
- 2002: Belshina Bobruisk
- 2003–2008: Baranovichi
- 2013: Baranovichi (interim)
- 2016: Baranovichi (interim)
- 2019–2020: Baranovichi
- * Club domestic league appearances and goals

Andrey Mikalayevich Khlebasolaw (Belarusian: Андрэй Мiкалаевiч Хлебасолаў; Russian: Андрей Николаевич Хлебосолов; born 22 November 1965) is a Belarusian professional football coach and a former player. His son Dmitri Khlebosolov is also a professional footballer.

== Career ==
Khlebasolaw started his football career at age 23 after three years in the navy.

== Honours ==
Belshina Bobruisk

- Belarusian Cup: 1996–97, 1998–99

Individual

- Belarusian Premier League top scorer: 1996, 1997
