= Alyaksandr Vyazhevich =

Belarusian football player

Personal information
- Full name: Alyaksandr Viktaravich Vyazhevich
- Date of birth: 7 June 1970 (age 56)
- Height: 1.78 m (5 ft 10 in)
- Position: Forward

Youth career
- 1988–1989: Dinamo Minsk

Senior career*
Years	Team	Apps	(Gls)
1990–1994	Molodechno	113	(48)
1995	Istochnik Rostov-on-Don	16	(4)
1996	Molodechno	29	(20)
1997	Chernomorets Novorossiysk	9	(1)
1997	Dynamo Stavropol	7	(0)
1997	→ Dynamo-d Stavropol	7	(3)
1998–2000	Dinamo Minsk	62	(31)
2000–2001	Nea Salamis Famagusta	24	(5)
2001	Belshina Bobruisk	6	(1)
2002–2003	Torpedo-SKA Minsk	19	(0)
2003	Zabudova Chist	8	(4)
2004	Molodechno	15	(3)

International career
1996–2000	Belarus	2	(0)
- * Club domestic league appearances and goals

Alyaksandr Viktaravich Vyazhevich (Belarusian: Аляксандр Віктаравіч Вяжэвіч; Russian: Александр Викторович Вяжевич; Aleksandr Viktorovich Vyazhevich; born 7 June 1970) is a former Belarusian football player.

== Honours ==
Metallurg Molodechno

- Belarusian SSR League: 1991
- Soviet Amateur Cup: 1991

Belshina Bobruisk

- Belarusian Premier League: 2001
