= Valery Strypeykis =

Belarusian footballer

Personal information
- Date of birth: 13 November 1974 (age 51)
- Place of birth: Pinsk, Byelorussian SSR, Soviet Union
- Height: 1.74 m (5 ft 9 in)
- Position: Forward

Team information
- Current team: Naftan Novopolotsk (assistant manager)

Senior career*
Years	Team	Apps	(Gls)
1994–1995	Biolog Novopolotsk	22	(31)
1995–1998	Naftan-Devon Novopolotsk	100	(48)
1999–2001	Slavia Mozyr	81	(47)
2001–2002	Ružomberok	3	(0)
2002	Belshina Bobruisk	24	(18)
2003	BATE Borisov	16	(8)
2003	FBK Kaunas	12	(4)
2004–2005	Naftan Novopolotsk	56	(34)
2006–2007	Gomel	50	(23)
2008	Shakhtyor Soligorsk	16	(2)
2009–2011	Naftan Novopolotsk	54	(3)
2012	Miory	12	(5)
Total		446	(223)

International career
1999–2001	Belarus	5	(0)

Managerial career
- 2011–2013: Naftan Novopolotsk (assistant)
- 2013–2016: Naftan Novopolotsk
- 2017–2019: Belarus (assistant)
- 2020–2021: Naftan Novopolotsk (assistant)
- 2021–2022: Naftan Novopolotsk
- 2022–: Naftan Novopolotsk (assistant)
- 2026: Naftan Novopolotsk (caretaker)
- * Club domestic league appearances and goals

Valery Strypeykis (Belarusian: Валерый Стрыпейкіс; Russian: Валерий Стрипейкис; born 13 November 1974) is a Belarusian football coach and former professional player. His latest club was Miory in 2012. Between 2013 and 2016 he managed Naftan Novopolotsk.

== Honours ==
Slavia Mozyr

- Belarusian Premier League: 2000
- Belarusian Cup: 1999–2000

FBK Kaunas

- A Lyga: 2003

Naftan Novopolotsk

- Belarusian Cup: 2008–09, 2011–12

Individual

- Belarusian Premier League top goalscorer: 1999, 2002, 2004, 2005
- CIS Cup top goalscorer: 2001 (shared)
