= Sergei Davydov (footballer, born 1979) =

Russian footballer

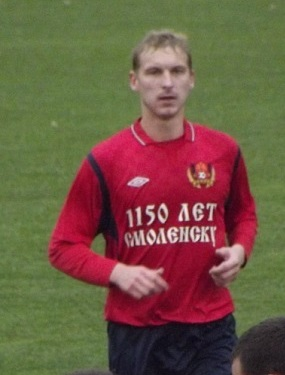

Personal information
- Full name: Sergei Yuryevich Davydov
- Date of birth: 28 July 1979 (age 47)
- Place of birth: Vyazma, Russian SFSR
- Height: 1.86 m (6 ft 1 in)
- Position: Forward

Senior career*
Years	Team	Apps	(Gls)
1998	Khimki	35	(5)
1999	Lokomotiv Vyazma		
2000–2001	Neman-Belcard Grodno	55	(43)
2002–2003	Lada Togliatti	59	(17)
2004	Chernomorets Novorossiysk	10	(1)
2004–2006	Nosta Novotroitsk	58	(33)
2007	Volga Ulyanovsk	20	(7)
2008	Lada Togliatti	24	(2)
2009–2016	Dnepr Smolensk	195	(31)
- * Club domestic league appearances and goals

Sergei Yuryevich Davydov (Russian: Серге́й Юрьевич Давыдов; born 28 July 1979) is a former Russian professional footballer.

== Honours ==
- Belarusian Premier League top scorer: 2001 (25 goals).
