= Yunost Stadium (Osipovichi) =

Football stadium in Osipovichi, Belarus

Youth Stadium
- Interactive map of Youth Stadium
- Location: Asipovichy, Belarus
- Coordinates: 53°19′26″N 28°38′39″E
- Owner: City of Asipovichy
- Capacity: 1,300
- Surface: Grass
- Field size: 105 x 68 meters

Construction
- Renovated: 1997

Tenant
- FC Osipovichi

Yunatstva or Yunost Stadium (Belarusian: Юнацтва, Russian: Юность, 'Youth Stadium') is a football stadium in Asipovichy (Osipovichi), Belarus. It is a home stadium for FC Asipovichy. The stadium holds 1,300 spectators.
