= Raman Vasilyuk =

Belarusian footballer

Raman Vasilyuk Раман Васілюк
Personal information
- Date of birth: 23 November 1978 (age 47)
- Place of birth: Brest, Belarusian SSR, Soviet Union
- Height: 1.77 m (5 ft 10 in)
- Position: Striker

Youth career
- 1994–1996: Dinamo Brest

Senior career*
Years	Team	Apps	(Gls)
1996–1999	Dinamo Brest	92	(51)
2000–2001	Slavia Mozyr	52	(42)
2001–2005	Spartak Moscow	7	(2)
2002	→ Dinamo Minsk (loan)	9	(2)
2004	→ Dinamo Brest (loan)	28	(17)
2004–2005	→ Hapoel Tel Aviv (loan)	9	(1)
2005–2008	Gomel	77	(54)
2008–2010	Dinamo Brest	59	(16)
2010–2012	Minsk	45	(13)
2012	BATE Borisov	9	(2)
2013	Minsk	30	(9)
2014–2015	Dinamo Brest	54	(16)
2016	Neman Grodno	13	(3)
2016–2018	Dinamo Brest	20	(0)
2021	Brestzhilstroy	10	(3)
Total		514	(231)

International career
1998–1999	Belarus U21	7	(1)
2000–2008	Belarus	24	(10)
- * Club domestic league appearances and goals as of 31 December 2021

Raman Vasilyuk (Belarusian: Раман Васілюк; Russian: Роман Василюк; born 23 November 1978) is a Belarusian former footballer.

== Career ==
He has played for Dinamo Brest, Slavia Mozyr, Spartak Moscow, Dinamo Minsk, Hapoel Tel Aviv, Gomel, Minsk, BATE Borisov, Neman Grodno, and was a member of the Belarus national team for around eight years.

Vasilyuk is currently an all-time top scorer of Belarusian Premier League, having scored over 200 goals since his debut in 1996.

== Honours ==
Slavia Mozyr

- Belarusian Premier League champion: 2000
- Belarusian Cup winner: 1999–2000

Spartak Moscow

- Russian Premier League champion: 2001

Dinamo Minsk

- Belarusian Cup winner: 2002–03

BATE Borisov

- Belarusian Premier League champion: 2012

Minsk

- Belarusian Cup winner: 2012–13

Dinamo Brest

- Belarusian Cup winner: 2016–17, 2017–18
- Belarusian Super Cup winner: 2018

Individual

- Belarusian Premier League top scorer: 2000, 2007
- CIS Cup top goalscorer: 2001 (shared)

== International goals ==
#	Date	Venue	Opponent	Score	Result	Competition
1	16 August 2000	Skonto Stadium, Riga, Latvia	Latvia	1–0	1–0	Friendly
2	28 March 2001	Dinamo Stadium, Minsk, Belarus	Norway	2–1	2–1	2002 FIFA World Cup qualification
3	5 September 2001	Dinamo Stadium, Minsk, Belarus	Poland	1–0	4–1	2002 FIFA World Cup qualification
4	5 September 2001	Dinamo Stadium, Minsk, Belarus	Poland	2–0	4–1	2002 FIFA World Cup qualification
5	5 September 2001	Dinamo Stadium, Minsk, Belarus	Poland	3–0	4–1	2002 FIFA World Cup qualification
6	5 September 2001	Dinamo Stadium, Minsk, Belarus	Poland	4–0	4–1	2002 FIFA World Cup qualification
7	10 September 2003	Sheriff Stadium, Tiraspol, Moldova	Moldova	1–2	1–2	UEFA Euro 2004 qualifying
8	6 June 2007	Vasil Levski National Stadium, Sofia, Bulgaria	Bulgaria	1–0	1–2	UEFA Euro 2008 qualifying
9	22 August 2007	Dinamo Stadium, Minsk, Belarus	Israel	1–0	2–1	Friendly
10	2 February 2008	Ta' Qali National Stadium, Attard, Malta	Iceland	1–0	2–0	2008 Malta International Football Tournament
