= City Stadium (Orsha) =

Sports stadium in Belarus

- Interactive map of City Stadium
- Full name: Central City Stadium
- Location: Orsha, Belarus
- Coordinates: 54°30′46″N 30°26′5″E
- Owner: Orsha Physical Culture and Sports Club
- Capacity: 2,582
- Surface: Grass
- Field size: 105 x 68 meters

Construction
- Renovated: 1999–2001, 2007–2008

Tenants
- FC Orsha; Lokomotiv-96 Vitebsk (1998–1999)

Central City Stadium is a multi-purpose stadium in Orsha, Belarus. It is mostly used for football matches and is a home stadium for FC Orsha. The stadium holds 2,582 spectators.

== History ==
Central City Stadium has been a home ground for a local club FC Orsha. During 1998–1999 it also hosted home games of Lokomotiv-96 Vitebsk, whose usual home stadium Dinamo was closed for a renovation. At present, the stadium is part of Orsha Physical Culture and Sports Club, an organization which manages several other sport facilities in Orsha and neighboring towns.
