= Yunost Stadium (Slonim) =

Multi-purpose stadium in Slonim, Belarus

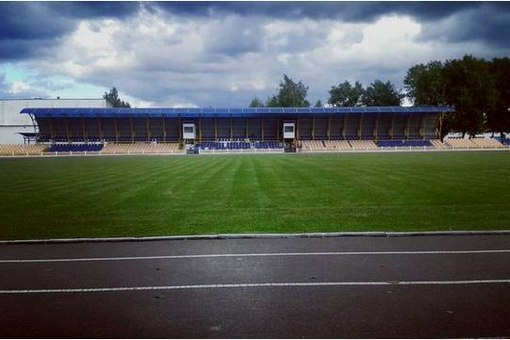
- Interactive map of Yunost Stadium
- Location: Slonim, Belarus
- Coordinates: 53°05′51″N 25°18′25″E
- Owner: City of Slonim
- Capacity: 2,220
- Surface: Grass
- Field size: 105 x 68 meters

Construction
- Renovated: 1999–2002

Tenants
- Kommunalnik Slonim; Slonim

Yunost Stadium is a multi-purpose stadium in Slonim, Belarus. It is mostly used for football matches and is a home stadium for FC Slonim. The stadium holds 2,220 spectators.

== History ==
In the past the stadium was a home venue for now-defunct club Kommunalnik Slonim, as well as for Beltransgaz Slonim (who became FC Slonim after absorbing Kommunalnik).

Between 1999 and 2002 the stadium was closed for renovation works. During that period Kommunalnik hosted its matches at the smaller Dinamo Stadium (capacity 1,200), which is currently in decaying state and only used for amateur and youth matches.
