= Belarusian Premier League =

Men's association football top division of Belarus

- Founded: 1992; 34 years ago
- Country: Belarus
- Confederation: UEFA
- Number of clubs: 16
- Level on pyramid: 1
- Relegation to: Belarusian First League
- Domestic cup(s): Belarusian Cup; Belarusian Super Cup
- International cup(s): UEFA Champions League; UEFA Conference League
- Current champions: Maxline Vitebsk (1st title) (2025)
- Most championships: BATE Borisov (15 titles)
- Top scorer: Raman Vasilyuk (218 goals)
- Broadcaster(s): Belarus 5
- Website: abff.by
- Current: 2026 Belarusian Premier League

The Belarusian Premier League (Belarusian: Вышэйшая ліга, Vyšejšaja Liha or Vysheyshaya Liga; Russian: Высшая лига; "Top League"), also called the BETERA Premier League for sponsorship reasons, is a professional association football league in Belarus and the highest level of the Belarusian football league system. It is organized by the Belarusian Football Federation. The number of teams in the competition has varied over the years from as high as 17 (1992–93 season) to as low as 11 (2012). As of 2025, the league included 16 teams. Each team plays every other team twice during the course of the season. At the end of the season, the two teams with the fewest points are automatically relegated to the Belarusian First League, while the third worst team plays a promotion-relegation playoff against the third best team from the second tier. The top two teams from the Belarusian First League automatically win promotion to the Premier League. Maxline Vitebsk are the current champions, after winning their first championship title in 2025.

== History ==
The Belarusian Premier League was organized in 1992. The first participants were: Dinamo Minsk, the only Belarusian side in the former Soviet Top League, five teams from the lower tiers of the Soviet league system and represented other five regional centers of Belarus, and ten teams who were previous competitors in the Belarusian SSR First League.

After the league creation, it was decided to change its schedule from a Soviet-style summer season to a European-style winter season. In 1995, the winter season experiment was proven unsuccessful due to poor weather and field conditions in Belarus in the late autumn and early spring. The season was changed back to summer. Every season since 1996 has been played in the summer. Throughout the 2000s, the number of competing teams has changed several times. 2012 season was played with only 11 teams due to last minute withdrawal of Partizan Minsk.

In its earliest years, the league was dominated by Dinamo Minsk, who won the league five times in a row between 1992 and 1995. During the next ten seasons, seven different teams finished as champions: Slavia Mozyr (1996 as MPKC Mozyr, 2000), Dinamo Minsk (1997, 2004), Dnepr-Transmash Mogilev (1998), BATE Borisov (1999, 2002), Belshina Bobruisk (2001), Gomel (2003), Shakhtyor Soligorsk (2005). Since 2006, BATE Borisov has dominated the league, winning 13 championships in a row (2006–2018).

In March 2020, due to the COVID-19 pandemic, all the other football leagues in Europe were postponed, and by the end of the month, the Belarusian Premier League was the only top-flight league in the continent that was still playing. Due to this, the league gained substantially increased viewership from abroad, with fans from all over the world watching the games online, due to the league being the only significant professional football available; the league signed new television rights deals with networks from countries including Russia and India. Matches were also streamed on the Belarusian Football Federation's YouTube channel. British betting companies also offered odds for the various matches, as the league's profile, previously relatively unknown outside of the country, grew a larger audience due to sporting inactivity elsewhere.

== Premier League in 2025 ==
Locations of the 2025 Belarusian Premier League teams

Team	Location	Venue	Capacity	Position in 2024
Arsenal	Dzerzhinsk	City Stadium	1,000	10th
BATE	Borisov	Borisov Arena	13,126	8th
Dinamo Brest	Brest	OSK Brestsky	10,169	4th
Dinamo Minsk	Minsk	Dinamo Stadium	22,000	1st
Gomel	Gomel	Central Stadium	14,307	6th
Isloch	Minsk	FC Minsk Stadium	3,000	7th
Maxline Vitebsk	Vitebsk	Vitebsky CSK	8,144	2nd (First League)
Minsk	Minsk	FC Minsk Stadium	3,000	13th
Molodechno	Molodechno	City Stadium	4,800	1st (First League)
Naftan	Novopolotsk	Atlant Stadium	5,300	14th
Neman	Grodno	Neman Stadium	8,479	2nd
Slavia	Mozyr	Yunost Stadium	5,300	11th
Slutsk	Slutsk	City Stadium	1,896	9th
Smorgon	Smorgon	Yunost Stadium	3,200	12th
Torpedo-BelAZ	Zhodino	Torpedo Stadium	6,524	3rd
Vitebsk	Vitebsk	Vitebsky CSK	8,144	5th

=== Soviet era champions ===
- 1922: Minsk (city team)
- 1923: Unknown
- 1924: Minsk (city team)
- 1925: Unknown
- 1926: Bobruisk (city team)
- 1927: Unknown
- 1928: Gomel (city team)
- 1929–32: Unknown
- 1933: Gomel (city team)
- 1934: BVO (Note: a team of the Belarusian Military District) (Minsk)
- 1935: BVO (Minsk)
- 1936: BVO (Minsk)
- 1937: Dinamo (Minsk)
- 1938: Dinamo (Minsk)
- 1939: Dinamo (Minsk)
- 1940: DKA (Note: a team of the Home of the Red Army (Home of the Red Army is a special organization and used to include sports section preceding the Army Sports Club (SKA))) (Minsk)
- 1941–44: Unknown
- 1945: Dinamo (Minsk)
- 1946: ODO (Minsk)
- 1947: Torpedo (Minsk)
- 1948: Traktor MTZ (Minsk)
- 1949: Traktor MTZ (Minsk)
- 1950: ODO (Minsk)
- 1951: Dinamo (Minsk)
- 1952: ODO (Minsk)
- 1953: Spartak (Minsk)
- 1954: ODO (Pinsk)
- 1955: FSM (Minsk)
- 1956: Spartak (Minsk)
- 1957: Sputnik (Minsk)
- 1958: Spartak (Bobruisk)
- 1959: Minsk (city team)
- 1960: Sputnik (Minsk)
- 1961: Volna (Pinsk)
- 1962: Torpedo (Minsk)
- 1963: Naroch' (Molodechno)
- 1964: SKA (Minsk)
- 1965: SKA (Minsk)
- 1966: Torpedo (Minsk)
- 1967: Torpedo (Minsk)
- 1968: Sputnik (Minsk)
- 1969: Torpedo (Minsk)
- 1970: Torpedo (Zhodino)
- 1971: Torpedo (Zhodino)
- 1972: Stroitel' (Bobruisk)
- 1973: Stroitel' (Bobruisk)
- 1974: BATE (Borisov)
- 1975: Dinamo (Minsk)
- 1976: BATE (Borisov)
- 1977: Sputnik (Minsk)
- 1978: Shinnik (Bobruisk)
- 1979: BATE (Borisov)
- 1980: Torpedo (Zhodino)
- 1981: Torpedo (Zhodino)
- 1982: Torpedo (Mogilev)
- 1983: Obuvschik (Lida)
- 1984: Orbita (Minsk)
- 1985: Obuvschik (Lida)
- 1986: Obuvschik (Lida)
- 1987: Shinnik (Bobruisk)
- 1988: Sputnik (Minsk)
- 1989: Obuvschik (Lida)
- 1990: Sputnik (Minsk)
- 1991: Metallurg (Molodechno)

== Champions and top scorers ==
Season	Champion	Runner-up	Third place	Top scorer
1992	Dinamo Minsk (1)	Dnepr Mogilev	Dinamo Brest	(Belarus) Andrey Skorobogatko (Dnepr Mogilev) (11)
1992–93	Dinamo Minsk (2)	KIM Vitebsk	Belarus Minsk	(Belarus) Sergey Baranovsky (Dinamo Minsk) (19) (Belarus) Miroslav Romaschenko (Vedrich Rechitsa / Dnepr Mogilev) (19)
1993–94	Dinamo Minsk (3)	Dinamo-93 Minsk	KIM Vitebsk	(Belarus) Pyotr Kachuro (Dinamo-93 Minsk / Dinamo Minsk) (21)
1994–95	Dinamo Minsk (4)	Dvina Vitebsk	Dinamo-93 Minsk	(Belarus) Pavel Shavrov (Dinamo-93 Minsk) (19)
1995	Dinamo Minsk (5)	MPKC Mozyr	Dinamo-93 Minsk	(Belarus) Sergey Yaromko (MPKC Mozyr) (16)
1996	MPKC Mozyr (1)	Dinamo Minsk	Belshina Bobruisk	(Belarus) Andrey Khlebasolaw (Belshina Bobruisk) (34)
1997	Dinamo Minsk (6)	Belshina Bobruisk	Lokomotiv-96 Vitebsk	(Belarus) Andrey Khlebasolaw (Belshina Bobruisk) (19)
1998	Dnepr-Transmash Mogilev (1)	BATE Borisov	Belshina Bobruisk	(Belarus) Sergey Yaromko (Torpedo Minsk) (19)
1999	BATE Borisov (1)	Slavia Mozyr	Gomel	(Belarus) Valery Strypeykis (Slavia Mozyr) (21)
2000	Slavia Mozyr (2)	BATE Borisov	Dinamo Minsk	(Belarus) Raman Vasilyuk (Slavia Mozyr) (31)
2001	Belshina Bobruisk (1)	Dinamo Minsk	BATE Borisov	(Russia) Sergei Davydov (Neman-Belcard Grodno) (25)
2002	BATE Borisov (2)	Neman Grodno	Shakhtyor Soligorsk	(Belarus) Valery Strypeykis (Belshina Bobruisk) (18)
2003	Gomel (1)	BATE Borisov	Dinamo Minsk	(Belarus) Gennadi Bliznyuk (Gomel) (18) (Belarus) Sergei Kornilenko (Dinamo Minsk) (18)
2004	Dinamo Minsk (7)	BATE Borisov	Shakhtyor Soligorsk	(Belarus) Valery Strypeykis (Naftan Novopolotsk) (18)
2005	Shakhtyor Soligorsk (1)	Dinamo Minsk	MTZ-RIPO Minsk	(Belarus) Valery Strypeykis (Naftan Novopolotsk) (16)
2006	BATE Borisov (3)	Dinamo Minsk	Shakhtyor Soligorsk	(Belarus) Alyaksandr Klimenka (Shakhtyor Soligorsk) (17)
2007	BATE Borisov (4)	Gomel	Shakhtyor Soligorsk	(Belarus) Raman Vasilyuk (Gomel) (24)
2008	BATE Borisov (5)	Dinamo Minsk	MTZ-RIPO Minsk	(Belarus) Gennadi Bliznyuk (BATE Borisov) (16) (Belarus) Vitali Rodionov (BATE Borisov) (16)
2009	BATE Borisov (6)	Dinamo Minsk	Dnepr Mogilev	(Brazil) Maycon (Gomel) (15)
2010	BATE Borisov (7)	Shakhtyor Soligorsk	Minsk	(Brazil) Renan Bressan (BATE Borisov) (15)
2011	BATE Borisov (8)	Shakhtyor Soligorsk	Gomel	(Brazil) Renan Bressan (BATE Borisov) (13)
2012	BATE Borisov (9)	Shakhtyor Soligorsk	Dinamo Minsk	(Belarus) Dzmitry Asipenka (Shakhtyor Soligorsk) (14)
2013	BATE Borisov (10)	Shakhtyor Soligorsk	Dinamo Minsk	(Belarus) Vitali Rodionov (BATE Borisov) (14)
2014	BATE Borisov (11)	Dinamo Minsk	Shakhtyor Soligorsk	(Belarus) Mikalay Yanush (Shakhtyor Soligorsk) (15)
2015	BATE Borisov (12)	Dinamo Minsk	Shakhtyor Soligorsk	(Belarus) Mikalay Yanush (Shakhtyor Soligorsk) (15)
2016	BATE Borisov (13)	Shakhtyor Soligorsk	Dinamo Minsk	(Belarus) Vitali Rodionov (BATE Borisov) (16) (Belarus) Mikhail Gordeichuk (BATE Borisov) (16)
2017	BATE Borisov (14)	Dinamo Minsk	Shakhtyor Soligorsk	(Belarus) Mikhail Gordeichuk (BATE Borisov) (18)
2018	BATE Borisov (15)	Shakhtyor Soligorsk	Dinamo Minsk	(Belarus) Pavel Savitski (Dinamo Brest) (15)
2019	Dynamo Brest (1)	BATE Borisov	Shakhtyor Soligorsk	(Belarus) Ilya Shkurin (Energetik-BGU Minsk) (19)
2020	Shakhtyor Soligorsk (2)	BATE Borisov	Torpedo-BelAZ Zhodino	(Belarus) Maksim Skavysh (BATE Borisov) (19)
2021	Shakhtyor Soligorsk (3)	BATE Borisov	Dinamo Minsk	(The Gambia) Dembo Darboe (Shakhtyor Soligorsk) (19)
2022	~~Shakhtyor Soligorsk~~	~~Energetik-BGU Minsk~~	BATE Borisov	(Uzbekistan) Bobur Abdikholikov (Energetik-BGU Minsk) (26)
2023	Dinamo Minsk (8)	Neman Grodno	Torpedo-BelAZ Zhodino	(Belarus) Vladislav Morozov (Dinamo Minsk) (16)
2024	Dinamo Minsk (9)	Neman Grodno	Torpedo-BelAZ Zhodino	(Gabon) Junior Effaghe (Gomel) (17)
2025	Maxline Vitebsk (1)	Dinamo Minsk	Slavia Mozyr	(Belarus) Aleksandr Shestyuk (Isloch) (17)
2026				

== Performances ==
=== Performance by club ===
Teams	Champion	Runner-up	Third place
BATE Borisov	15 (1999, 2002, 2006, 2007, 2008, 2009, 2010, 2011, 2012, 2013, 2014, 2015, 2016, 2017, 2018)	7 (1998, 2000, 2003, 2004, 2019, 2020, 2021)	2 (2001, 2022)
Dinamo Minsk	9 (1992, 1992–93, 1993–94, 1994–95, 1995, 1997, 2004, 2023, 2024)	10 (1996, 2001, 2005, 2006, 2008, 2009, 2014, 2015, 2017, 2025)	7 (2000, 2003, 2012, 2013, 2016, 2018, 2021)
Shakhtyor Soligorsk	3 (2005, 2020, 2021)	6 (2010, 2011, 2012, 2013, 2016, 2018)	8 (2002, 2004, 2006, 2007, 2014, 2015, 2017, 2019)
Slavia Mozyr	2 (1996, 2000)	2 (1995, 1999)	1 (2025)
Gomel	1 (2003)	1 (2007)	2 (1999, 2011)
Belshina Bobruisk	1 (2001)	1 (1997)	2 (1996, 1998)
Dnepr Mogilev	1 (1998)	1 (1992)	1 (2009)
Dynamo Brest	1 (2019)	–	1 (1992)
Maxline Vitebsk	1 (2025)	–	–
Neman Grodno	–	3 (2002, 2023, 2024)	–
Vitebsk	–	2 (1992–93, 1994–95)	2 (1993–94, 1997)
Dinamo-93 Minsk	–	1 (1993–94)	3 (1992–93, 1994–95, 1995)
Torpedo-BelAZ Zhodino	–	–	3 (2020, 2023, 2024)
Partizan Minsk	–	–	2 (2005, 2008)
Minsk	–	–	1 (2010)

== All-time table ==
As of end of 2023 season.

Club^{1}	Seasons	Debut	Last Season	Pld^{2}	W	D	L	Goals	Points^{3}	Best Result
**Dinamo Minsk**	33	1992	—	939	560	202	177	1701–794	1882	**1st** (1992, 1992–93, 1993–94, 1994–95, 1995, 1997, 2004, 2023, 2024)
**BATE Borisov**	26	1998	—	758	496	157	105	1493–598	1645	**1st** (1999, 2002, 2006, 2007, 2008, 2009, 2010, 2011, 2012, 2013, 2014, 2015, 2016, 2017, 2018)
**Shakhtyor Soligorsk**	33	1992	—	939	467	222	252	1413–921	1578	**1st** (2005, 2020, 2021)(2022)
**Neman Grodno**	33	1992	—	940	349	243	348	1080–1115	1290	2nd (2002, 2023)
**Dinamo Brest**	33	1992	—	939	333	232	374	1179–1235	1231	**1st** (2019)
**Gomel**	27	1992	—	739	290	167	282	1043–929	1037	**1st** (2003)
**Vitebsk**	27	1992	2022	761	271	201	289	859–933	1014	2nd (1992–93, 1994–95)
**Dnepr Mogilev**	26	1992	2022	737	264	179	284	934–962	971	**1st** (1998)
**Torpedo-BelAZ Zhodino**	24	1992	—	689	260	182	247	822–789	962	3rd (2020, 2023)
Belshina Bobruisk	23	1993–94	2023	666	233	151	282	876–952	839	**1st** (2001)
**Slavia Mozyr**	21	1995	—	596	217	143	246	826–878	764	**1st** (1996, 2000)
**Naftan Novopolotsk**	22	1996	—	643	196	136	311	744–1002	719	4th (2009)
**Minsk**	16	2007	—	474	161	121	191	566–609	605	3rd (2010)
Torpedo Minsk	15	1992	2019	428	158	115	155	481–475	589	4th (2002, 2003)
Dinamo-93 Minsk	7	1992–93	1998	181	99	43	39	296–157	340	2nd (1993–94)
**Slutsk**	10	2014	—	293	86	74	133	284–394	332	7th (2017)
**Isloch Minsk Raion**	8	2016	—	236	92	53	91	292–313	329	4th (2023)
Molodechno-2000	12	1992	2003	323	80	80	163	339–490	320	4th (1994–95)
Partizan Minsk	7	2004	2010	198	80	42	76	288–281	282	3rd (2005, 2008)
Torpedo-Kadino Mogilev	10	1992	2000	271	64	76	131	266–444	268	7th (1992)
Energetik-BGU Minsk	9	2002	2023	258	71	58	129	305–451	248	2nd (2022)
Gorodeya	5	2016	2020	149	44	50	55	162–184	182	7th (2019)
Vedrich-97 Rechitsa	8	1992	2001	208	46	44	118	167–327	182	8th (1992)
Darida Minsk Raion	6	2003	2008	168	44	38	86	165–252	170	8th (2006)
Bobruisk	5	1992	1995	122	44	34	44	119–145	166	4th (1992)
Lida	7	1992	2000	182	38	46	98	144–289	160	8th (1994–95)
Granit Mikashevichi	4	2008	2016	112	31	35	46	112–161	128	5th (2015)
**Smorgon**	5	2007	—	139	28	38	73	112–239	124	8th (2008)
Ataka Minsk	3	1995	1997	75	29	16	30	86–93	103	4th (1995)
Rukh Brest	2	2020	2021	59	26	21	12	106–66	99	5th (2021)
Lokomotiv Minsk	4	2003	2008	112	23	25	64	100–187	94	11th (2005)
Lokomotiv Vitebsk	4	1992	1994–95	107	22	27	58	82–181	93	10th (1993–94)
Kommunalnik Slonim	3	1997	2000	89	15	17	57	66–191	62	11th (1997)
Stroitel Starye Dorogi	3	1992	1993–94	77	14	18	45	48–117	60	14th (1992, 1992–93)
Krumkachy Minsk	2	2016	2017	60	14	16	30	50–86	58	11th (2016)
Smolevichi	2	2018	2020	59	8	14	37	48–111	38	15th (2018)
Transmash Mogilev	1	1997	1997	30	8	4	18	30–52	28	14th (1997)
Dnyapro Mogilev	1	2019	2019	29	7	6	16	29–42	25	14th (2019)
Luch Minsk	1	2018	2018	30	4	12	14	24–44	24	13th (2018)
**Arsenal Dzerzhinsk**	1	2022	2022	30	5	8	17	18–42	23	14th (2022)
Savit Mogilev	1	2008	2008	30	5	6	19	28–61	21	15th (2008)
Svisloch-Krovlya Osipovichi	1	1999	1999	30	4	4	22	24–74	16	15th (1999)
Sputnik Rechitsa	1	2021	2021	15	2	1	12	12–37	7	16th (2021)

1. For clubs that have been renamed, their name at the time of their most recent season in the Premier League is given. The current members are listed **in bold**.
2. Includes 2002 championship play-off, 2004 relegation play-off, 14 games of Dinamo-93 in 1998 season, 15 games of Torpedo Minsk in 2019 season, and 15 games of Sputnik Rechitsa in 2021 season.
3. For the purposes of this table, each win is worth 3 points. The three-points system was adopted in fall 1995 season.

== Player of the year ==
Belarusian Premier League Player of the year is an annual award given by a sports newspaper Pressball.

Season	Player	Club
1992	(Belarus) Valyantsin Byalkevich	Dinamo Minsk
1992–93	(Belarus) Sergey Gotsmanov	Dinamo Minsk
1993–94	(Belarus) Yury Shukanov	Dinamo Minsk
1994–95	(Belarus) Valyantsin Byalkevich	Dinamo Minsk
1995	(Belarus) Valyantsin Byalkevich	Dinamo Minsk
1996	(Belarus) Alyaksandr Kulchy	MPKC Mozyr
1997	(Belarus) Andrei Lavrik	Dinamo Minsk
1998	(Russia) Oleg Kononov	Torpedo Minsk
1999	(Russia) Dmitri Karsakov	Slavia Mozyr
2000	(Belarus) Aleksandr Lisovskiy	BATE Borisov
2001	(Belarus) Vitali Kutuzov	BATE Borisov
2002	(Belarus) Dzmitry Likhtarovich	BATE Borisov
2003	(Belarus) Timofei Kalachev	Shakhtyor Soligorsk
2004	(Belarus) Andrey Razin	Dinamo Minsk
2005	(Belarus) Vital Valadzyankow	Dinamo Minsk
2006	(Belarus) Oleg Strakhanovich	MTZ-RIPO Minsk
2007	(Belarus) Raman Vasilyuk	Gomel
2008	(Belarus) Vitali Rodionov	BATE Borisov
2009	(Belarus) Sergey Krivets	BATE Borisov
2010	(Brazil) Renan Bressan	BATE Borisov
2011	(Brazil) Renan Bressan	BATE Borisov
2012	(Belarus) Stanislaw Drahun	Dinamo Minsk
2013	(Belarus) Alexander Hleb	BATE Borisov
2014	(Belarus) Ihar Stasevich	Dinamo Minsk
2015	(Belarus) Ihar Stasevich	BATE Borisov
2016	(Belarus) Ihar Stasevich	BATE Borisov
2017	(Belarus) Mikhail Gordeichuk	BATE Borisov
2018	(Belarus) Ihar Stasevich	BATE Borisov
2019	(Belarus) Ihar Stasevich	BATE Borisov

== Reserves League ==
An annual league competition is organized for the reserve teams of Premier League clubs since 2001. This tournament was won by the reserves of Dinamo Minsk (9 titles), Gomel (2 titles), Shakhtyor Soligorsk (2 titles), BATE Borisov (1 title), Torpedo-BelAZ Zhodino (1 title) and Dnepr Mogilev (1 title).

== Attendances ==
The average attendance per top-flight football league season and the club with the highest average attendance:

Season	League average	Best club	Best club average
2019	2,463	Dynamo Brest	8,839
2018	1,943	Dynamo Brest	6,572
2017	2,019	Dynamo Brest	5,289
2016	1,481	BATE	4,796
2015	1,696	BATE	5,070
2014	1,853	BATE	5,964
2013	2,119	Gomel	4,256
2012	2,053	BATE	4,598
2011	2,372	Gomel	4,841
2010	2,301	BATE	4,530
2009	2,661	Gomel	5,123
2008	1,715	Gomel	3,700
2007	2,475	Gomel	6,131
2006	2,318	Gomel	5,969
2005	2,192	Gomel	3,854
2004	1,977	Gomel	3,967
2003	2,103	Gomel	4,053
2002	2,826	Neman	10,269
2001	2,867	Neman	4,400
2000	3,092	BATE	4,944
