= Stroitel Stadium (Soligorsk) =

Football stadium in Soligorsk, Belarus

- Стадыён «Будаўнік»
- Budawnik Stadium
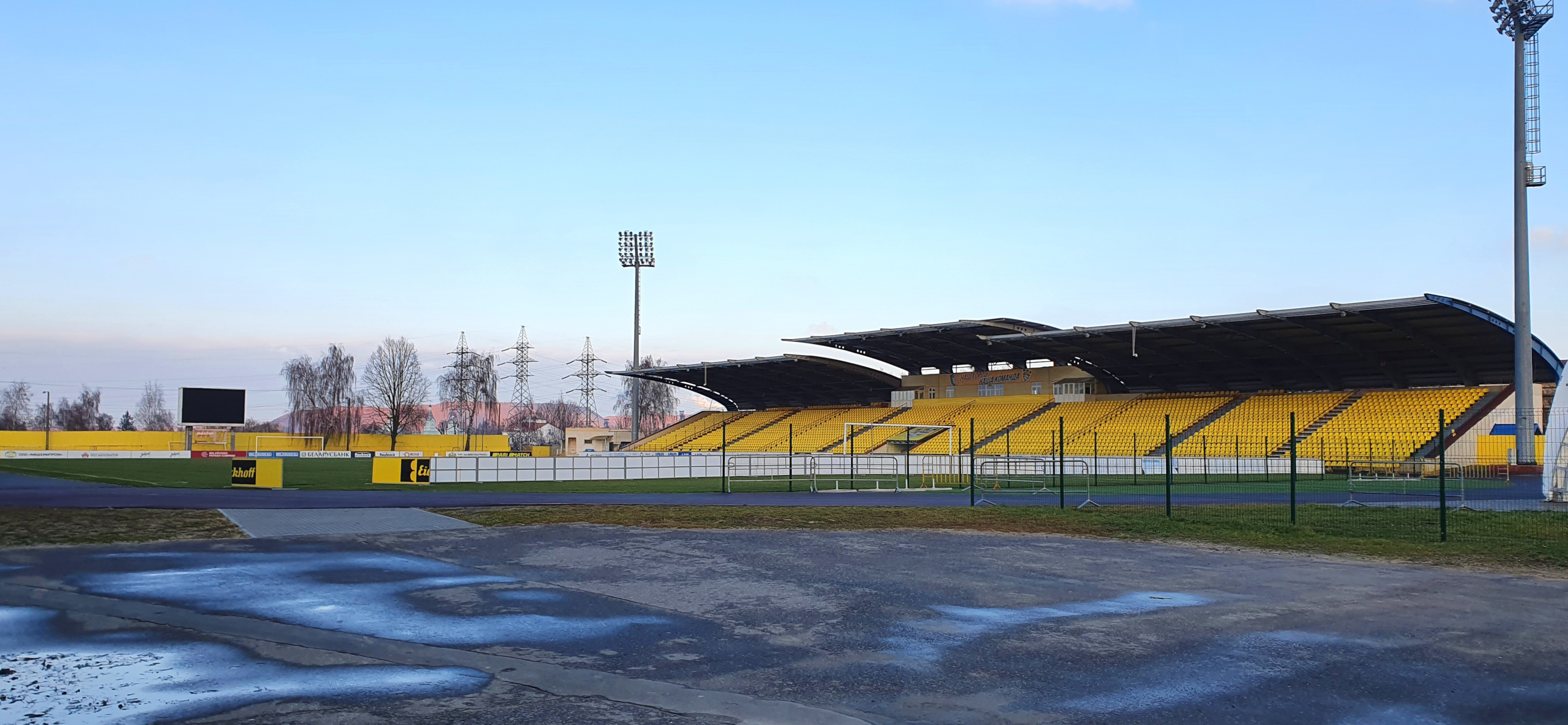
- Interactive map of Stroitel Stadium
- Location: Salihorsk, Belarus
- Coordinates: 52°47′54″N 27°32′18″E
- Capacity: 4,200
- Surface: Grass

Construction
- Opened: 1973
- Renovated: 2006

Tenants
- Shakhtyor Soligorsk

Stroitel Stadium or Budawnik Stadium (Belarusian: Стадыён «Будаўнік», Russian: Строитель) is a multi-purpose stadium in Salihorsk (Soligorsk), Belarus. It is currently used mostly for football matches and is the home ground of Shakhtyor Soligorsk. The stadium was built in 1976 and it currently holds 4,200 people.
