= City Stadium (Molodechno) =

Sports stadium in Belarus

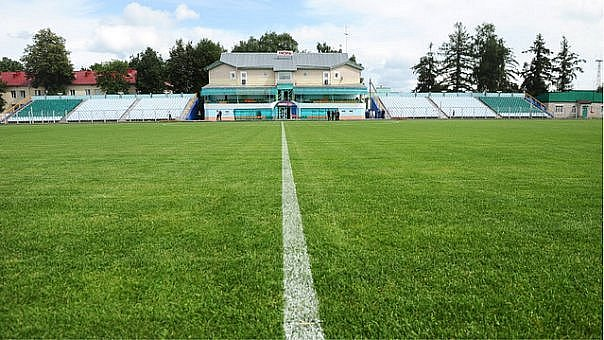
- Interactive map of City Stadium
- Location: Maladzyechna, Belarus
- Coordinates: 53°1′17″N 27°32′46″E
- Capacity: 4,800
- Surface: Grass

Construction
- Opened: 1946
- Renovated: 2004–2005

Tenants
- Molodechno-DYuSSh-4; Lokomotiv Minsk (2006–2008); Islach Minsk Raion (2015–)

City Stadium (Belarusian: Гарадскі стадыён, romanized: Haradski stadyyon) is a multi-use stadium in Maladzyechna (Molodechno), Belarus. It is currently used mostly for football matches and is the home ground of Molodechno-DYuSSh-4. The stadium holds 4,800 spectators.

== History ==
The stadium was opened in 1946 and has been used by a local club FC Molodechno ever since. It was known as Metallurg Stadium until 1993, before being renamed to City Stadium. Between 2006 and 2008 it was a home venue for Lokomotiv Minsk and in 2015 it was used by Islach Minsk Raion.

== International use ==
Over the years the City Stadium has been used as an occasional home venue for Belarus national under-21 team and Belarus women's national team. It has hosted some games of UEFA youth (U17/19) championships qualifying groups.

In 1996, it the stadium hosted a friendly match of Belarus national team against Azerbaijan. In mid-90s it was also used as a home venue for Dinamo-93 Minsk in European Cups.
