= Torpedo Stadium (Minsk) =

Sports venue in Minsk, Belarus

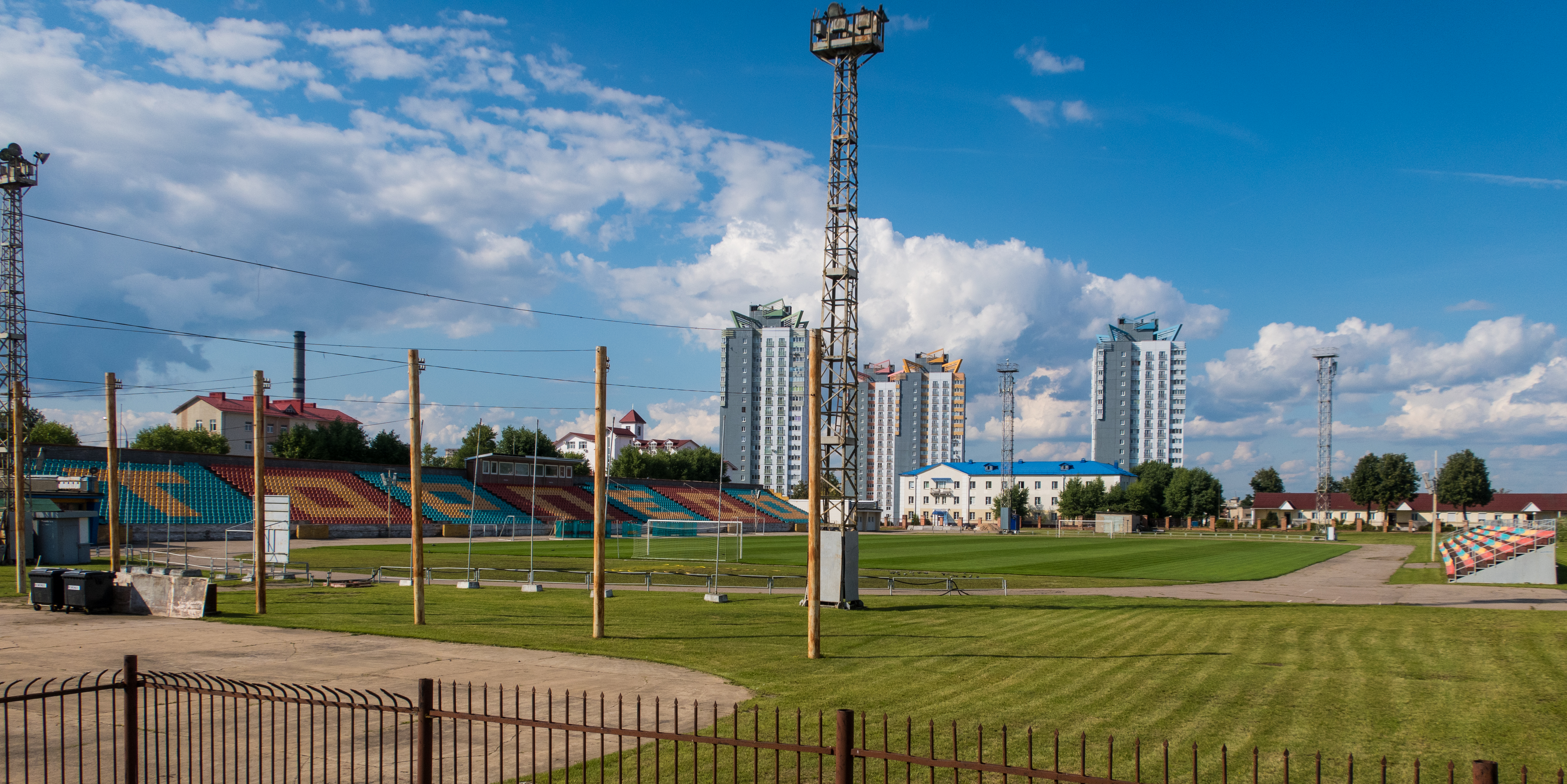
- Interactive map of Torpedo Stadium
- Location: Minsk, Belarus
- Coordinates: 53°52′12″N 27°39′27″E
- Owner: FC Minsk
- Capacity: 5,200
- Surface: Grass

Construction
- Opened: 1958; 68 years ago

Tenants
- Torpedo Minsk (1958–2005, 2014–present); Minsk (2006–2009, 2013–2015)

Torpedo Stadium or Tarpeda Stadium (Belarusian: Стадыён Тарпеда) is a multi-use stadium in Minsk, Belarus. It is used mostly for football matches and is the home ground of Torpedo Minsk. The stadium holds 5,200 spectators.

== History ==
The stadium was built and opened in 1958. It was used by Torpedo Minsk until the club's dissolution in 2005.

Since 2006, the stadium in owned by FC Minsk, who used it as a primary home ground during 2006–2009 and 2013–2015. In 2014, reformed Torpedo Minsk started using the stadium again, leasing it from FC Minsk.

The stadium is also used occasionally as a home venue for Belarus national youth and female teams. In 2009, it hosted matches of the 2009 UEFA Women's Under-19 Championship.
