= Spartak Stadium (Bobruisk) =

Sports venue in Bobruisk, Belarus

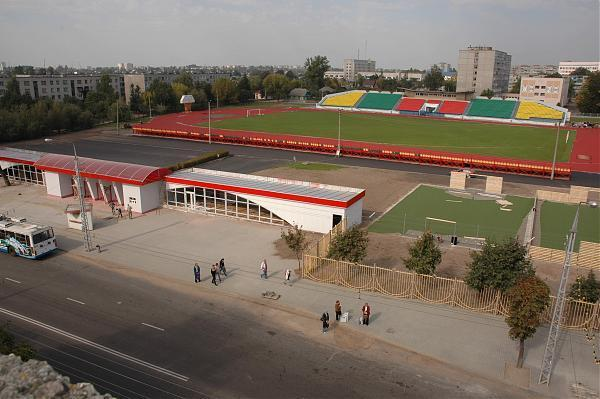
- Location: Bobruisk, Belarus
- Coordinates: 53°8′25″N 29°13′2″E
- Capacity: 3,700
- Surface: Grass

Construction
- Opened: 1934
- Renovated: 2004, 2006

Tenants
- Belshina Bobruisk; Bobruichanka Bobruisk; Bobruisk (1992–1995)

Spartak Stadium is a multi-use stadium in Bobruisk, Belarus. It is currently used mostly for football matches and is the home ground of Belshina Bobruisk as well as women's team Bobruichanka Bobruisk. The stadium holds 3,700 people.

The stadium was opened in April 1934 and reconstructed in 2004 and 2006 to get a modern look and bigger capacity.
