= Regional Sport Complex Brestsky =

Sports complex in Brest, Belarus

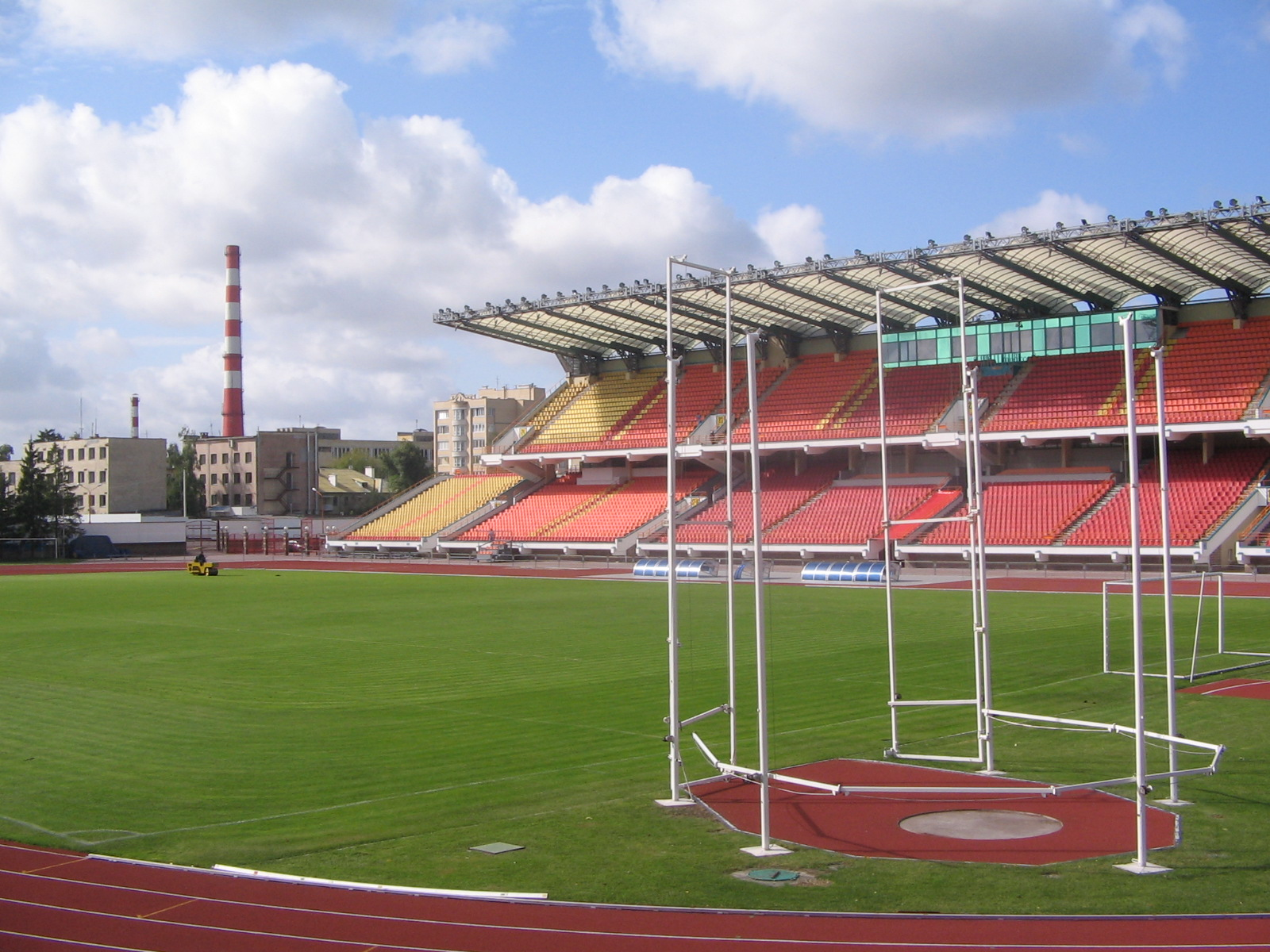
- Interactive map of Regional Sport Complex Brestsky
- Former names: Spartak Stadium (1939–1972); Dinamo Stadium (1972–1999)
- Location: Brest, Belarus
- Coordinates: 52°05′23.38″N 23°41′02.09″E
- Capacity: 10,060
- Surface: Grass

Construction
- Built: 1937
- Renovated: 1996–1999

Tenant
- Dinamo Brest

Regional Sport Complex Brestsky (Belarusian: Абласны спартыўны комплекс «Брэсцкi», romanized: Ablasny spartyŭny komplieks «Brescki»; Russian: Областной спортивный комплекс «Брестский»), also known simply as OSK Brestsky or ASK Brestski is a multi-use stadium in Brest, Belarus. It is currently used mostly for football matches and is the home ground of FC Dinamo Brest. The stadium holds 10,060 people.

The complex was built in 1937 and given the name Spartak Stadium in 1939. In 1972, it was renamed to Dinamo Stadium and reassigned to Dinamo sport society along with local football team. Stadium's major reconstruction and renovation started in 1996. After partial completion in 1999, it was rebranded as Regional Sport Complex Brestsky.

Another stadium in Brest currently known as Dinamo Stadium was built in 1989 and originally known as Stroitel Stadium. It was renamed to Dinamo Stadium in 2004 and is currently used as home ground for FC Dinamo Brest reserve team.

== International use ==
OSK Brestsky is one of the few Belarusian stadia that is allowed to host group stage and knockout phase matches of European club competitions. It was also used as a home ground for Belarus national football team on one occasion, which was a 2010 FIFA World Cup qualification match against Kazakhstan in October 2009 that ended with 4–0 win for Belarus.
