= Yunost Stadium (Mazyr) =

Football stadium in Mazyr, Belarus

Youth Stadium
- Location: Mazyr, Belarus
- Coordinates: 52°2′20″N 29°16′37.5″E
- Capacity: 5,133
- Field size: 105 x 68 metres
- Surface: Grass
- Opened: 1991

Tenants
- FC Slavija Mazyr

Youth Stadium (Belarusian: Юнацтва, romanized: Yunatstva, Russian: Юность, romanized: Yunost), also Junactva Stadium, is a multi-purpose stadium in Mazyr, Belarus. It is currently used mostly for football matches and is the home ground of FC Slaviya Mazyr. The stadium was opened in 1992 and currently holds 5,133 people.
