= FC Torpedo Minsk =

Association football club in Belarus

Torpedo Minsk
- Full name: FC Torpedo Minsk
- Nickname(s): Чорна-белыя (The Black-Whites); Аўтазаводцы (Car factory men)
- Founded: 1947; 78 years ago
- Ground: Torpedo Stadium, Minsk
- Capacity: 4,800
- Head coach: Aleksandr Mostovich
- League: Belarusian Second League
- 2019: Premier League, 16th (withdrew)
Home colours	Away colours

FC Torpedo Minsk or PFK Tarpeda Minsk (Belarusian: ПФК Тарпеда Мінск; Russian: ПФК Торпедо Минск) is a Belarusian football club, playing in Minsk. The team plays their home games at the Torpedo Stadium in Minsk, which holds 4,800 people. They currently play in Belarusian Second League.

== History ==
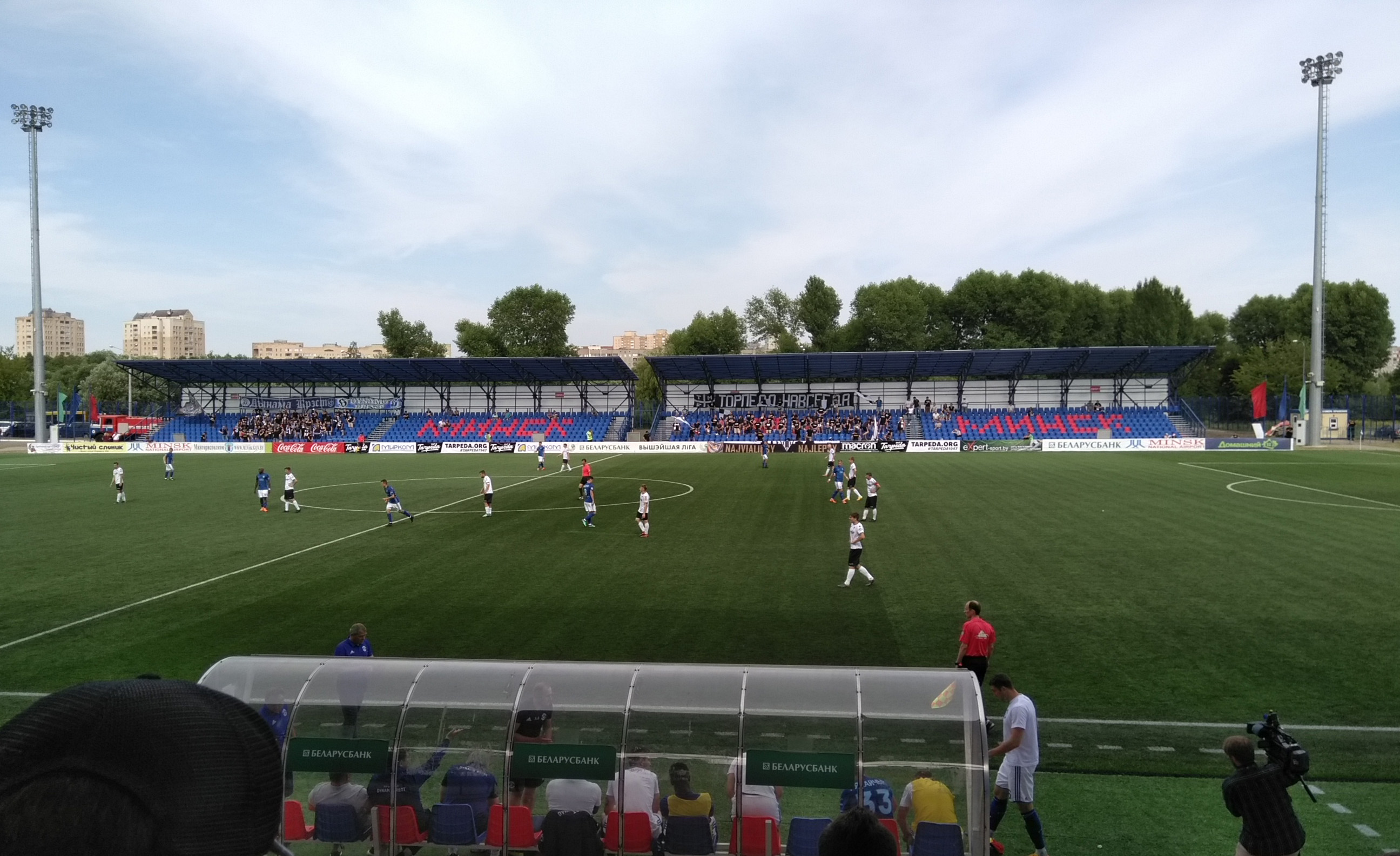
Torpedo playing against FC Dynamo Brest (June 2018)

During Soviet years, Torpedo was playing in the Belarusian SSR top league and won championships in 1947, 1962, 1966, 1967 and 1969.

The team was playing in the Belarusian Premier League since 1992. Their most successful years were in the early 2000s, when the team finished in 4th position twice in a row (2002, 2003) and reached the final of the Belarusian Cup (2000).

In early 2005, Torpedo-SKA lost financial support from their sponsor and, after losing almost all their main squad and not having funds to pay entrance fee for next season's Premiere League, had to relegate to the Second League. Torpedo-SKA won the Second League in 2005, but at the end of the season, the club was disbanded. The owner moved to a new football team, named FC Minsk (legally a successor of Smena Minsk), which also used the same office and stadium as disbanded Torpedo-SKA. Only one player from Torpedo-SKA 2005 squad joined Minsk.

In 2007, the team was reformed as Torpedo-MAZ and started playing in Minsk championship, which is a part of KFK, Belarusian amateur league (4th lever in league pyramid). In 2009, the team finished in 3rd position and was eligible to represent Minsk in the final tournament for two promotion spots to the Second League (as the first two teams either declined or weren't eligible), but finished on the 3rd position. Successful performance in Minsk championship and cup allowed them to qualify for Belarusian Cup twice (2009 and 2010), but they were eliminated from the tournament after the first game both times.

In 2014, the team rejoined Belarusian Second League under their original name Torpedo Minsk, and in the following year was won the promotion into Belarusian First League. In 2018, they were promoted to the Belarusian Premier League as a replacement for Krumkachy Minsk, who had their Premier League license revoked due to debts.

Midway through the 2019 season, Torpedo withdrew from the Premier League due to lack of financing. All their remaining matches were forfeited 0–3 in favor of their opponents.

Name changes

- 1947: Torpedo (Tarpeda)
- 1999: Torpedo-MAZ (Tarpeda-MAZ)
- 2003: Torpedo-SKA (Tarpeda-SKA)
- 2005: disbanded
- 2007: Torpedo-MAZ
- 2014: Torpedo

== Current squad ==
As of October 2023

Note: Flags indicate national team as defined under FIFA eligibility rules; some limited exceptions apply. Players may hold more than one non-FIFA nationality.

No.	Pos.	Nation	Player
—	GK	(Belarus) BLR	Denis Karbanovich
—	GK	(Belarus) BLR	Vadzim Lebedzew
—	GK	(Belarus) BLR	Aleksandr Ozhigin
—	DF	(Belarus) BLR	Dmitriy Bortnik
—	DF	(Belarus) BLR	Ilya Denisenya
—	DF	(Belarus) BLR	Yevgeniy Zaboronko
—	DF	(Belarus) BLR	Nikita Skuratovets
—	DF	(Belarus) BLR	Ruslan Strelchenya
—	DF	(Belarus) BLR	Aleksey Tseluyev
—	DF	(Belarus) BLR	Vladislav Shut
—	DF	(Belarus) BLR	Vladislav Yakavitskiy
—	DF	(Belarus) BLR	Yevgeniy Yastremskiy
—	MF	(Belarus) BLR	Ivan Bashkov
—	MF	(Belarus) BLR	Ivan Grusha

No.	Pos.	Nation	Player
—	MF	(Belarus) BLR	Aleksey Demidovich
—	MF	(Belarus) BLR	Artem Korenevskiy
—	MF	(Belarus) BLR	Maksim Kuratskiy
—	MF	(Belarus) BLR	Yegor Lobakh
—	MF	(Belarus) BLR	Vladislav Tsurko
—	MF	(Belarus) BLR	Maksim Sharendo
—	MF	(Belarus) BLR	Zakhar Yakubtsevich
—	FW	(Belarus) BLR	Dzmitry Ivanovich
—	FW	(Belarus) BLR	Kanstantsin Kazakow
—	FW	(Belarus) BLR	Maksim Mozol
—	FW	(Belarus) BLR	Andrey Novik
—	FW	(Belarus) BLR	Yevgeniy Pashkevich
—	FW	(Belarus) BLR	Rostislav Sery

== Honours ==
- Belarusian Cup
  - Runners-up (1): 2000
- Football Championship of the Belarusian SSR
  - Winners (7): 1947, 1948, 1949, 1962, 1966, 1967, 1969
  - Runners-up (4): 1950, 1963, 1968, 1983

== League and Cup history ==
Season	Level	Pos	Pld	W	D	L	Goals	Points	Domestic Cup	Notes
1992	1st	10	15	5	3	7	15–17	13	Quarter-finals	
1992–93	1st	9	32	10	10	12	29–33	30	Round of 32	
1993–94	1st	6	30	9	15	6	18–18	33	Quarter-finals	
1994–95	1st	6	30	11	10	9	36–29	32	Round of 16	
1995	1st	9	15	5	3	7	12–27	18	Round of 32	
1996	1st	12	30	7	8	15	32–53	29	Round of 32	
1997	1st	8	30	12	6	12	45–43	42	Round of 16	
1998	1st	7	28	12	8	8	44–22	44	Round of 16	
1999	1st	10	30	10	5	15	31–47	35	Semi-finals	
2000	1st	8	30	13	10	7	45–28	49	Runners-up	
2001	1st	8	26	10	7	9	31–32	37	Round of 16	
2002	1st	4	26	15	6	5	30–16	51	Round of 16	
2003	1st	4	30	19	7	4	54–20	64	Round of 16	
2004	1st	6	30	13	7	10	37–31	46	Round of 32	Bankrupted, relegated
2005	3rd	1	26	22	4	0	75–9	70	Round of 16	Disbanded
2006									Round of 64	
2007	4th	5	20	8	3	9	37-42	27		
2008	4th	5	14	4	3	7	19-33	15		
2009	4th	3								
2010	4th	4	18	10	2	6	35-17	32	Round of 64	
2011	4th	1	14	9	3	2	40-14	30	Round of 64	
2012	4th	3	14	7	2	5	25–20	23		
2013	4th	9	22	7	4	11	36–38	25		
2014	3rd	6	22	8	5	9	28–26	29		
2015	3rd	4	18	10	4	4	27–13	34	Round of 128	promoted
2016	2nd	9	26	9	6	11	35–36	33	Round of 64	
2017	2nd	3	30	17	6	7	60–29	57	Round of 32	promoted
2018	1st	14	30	6	6	18	20–41	24	Round of 32	
2019	1st	16	30	1	3	26	4–63	6	Round of 16	Withdrew, relegated
2020									Round of 16	Disbanded
