= 2000–01 Belarusian Cup =

Tournament details
- Country: Belarus
- Teams: 43

Final positions
- Champions: Belshina Bobruisk (3rd title)
- Runners-up: Slavia Mozyr

Tournament statistics
- Matches played: 47
- Goals scored: 134 (2.85 per match)
- Top goal scorer(s): Valery Strypeykis (4 goals)

The 2000–01 Belarusian Cup was the 10th season of the Belarusian annual football cup competition. Contrary to the league season, the competition has been conducted in a fall-spring rhythm. The first games were played on 14 June 2000 and the final on 27 May 2001, which was won by Belshina Bobruisk.

== First round ==
The games were played on 14 June 2000. Khimik Svetlogorsk advanced to the next round by a drawing of lots.

14 June 2000	Baranovichi (III)	2–1 (a.e.t.)	Neman Mosty (II)	Baranovichi
	Malyavko 65'; Zhdanovich 117'		Gratskevich 26'	Stadium: Lokomotiv Stadium; Attendance: 3,500; Referee: Valeriy Petrovich (Minsk)

14 June 2000	Veras Nesvizh (III)	1–0	Molodechno (II)	Nesvizh
	Shpadaruk 18'			Stadium: Urozhay Stadium; Attendance: 1,200; Referee: Gennady Yakubovsky (Minsk)

14 June 2000	Orbita Minsk (III)	0–1	Zvezda-VA-BGU Minsk (II)	Minsk
			Shushkevich 28'	Stadium: Orbita Stadium; Attendance: 100; Referee: Valery Vyalichka (Minsk)

14 June 2000	Ozertsy Glubokoye (III)	3–1	Orsha (II)	Shunevichi
	Ovodov 5' (pen.); Kazlowski 40'; Shebalkov 67'		Provalinskiy 50'	Attendance: 1,000; Referee: Frants Letyago (Grodno)

14 June 2000	Pruzhany (III)	1–2 (a.e.t.)	Granit Mikashevichi (II)	Pruzhany
	Petruchik 44'		A. Bakhno 52'; Kirilko 105'	Attendance: 2,000; Referee: Konstantin Daylid (Brest)

14 June 2000	Starye Dorogi (III)	0–1	Rogachev (II)	Starye Dorogi
			Khmelev 83'	Stadium: City Stadium; Attendance: 500; Referee: Valeriy Yazevich (Lida)

14 June 2000	Niva Zhitkovichi (III)	2–4	Torpedo Zhodino (II)	Zhitkovichi
	Timoschenya 17'; Savchits 48'		Taran 9', 11' (pen.); Mikhaychik 13', 35'	Stadium: City Stadium; Attendance: 300; Referee: Nikolay Voytenkov (Mogilev)

14 June 2000	Vertikal Kalinkovichi (III)	2–0	Polesye Kozenki (II)	Kalinkovichi
	Pilipeyko 44'; Golovach 55'			Stadium: City Stadium; Attendance: 2,000; Referee: Mikhail Tsukanov (Gomel)

14 June 2000	Vodokanal-Transit Brest (III)	2–1 (a.e.t.)	Svisloch-Krovlya Osipovichi (II)	Brest
	Turov 35'; Stepanyuk 106'		Mikhaylov 85'	Attendance: 300; Referee: Yuriy Kuntsevich (Grodno)

14 June 2000	Darida Minsk Raion (III)	1–0	Luninets (II)	Minsk
	Lagutko 55'			Stadium: Orbita Stadium; Attendance: 100; Referee: Oleg Chikun (Stolbtsy)

14 June 2000	Zabudova Chist (III)	2–1 (a.e.t.)	ZLiN Gomel (II)	Chist
	Kozyak 68'; Balykin 93'		Pimoshenko 32'	Stadium: School Stadium; Attendance: 400; Referee: Valeriy Semyonov (Minsk)

14 June 2000	Smorgon (III)	1–0	Keramik Bereza (II)	Smorgon
	Selivanov 79'			Stadium: City Stadium; Attendance: 1,500; Referee: Mikhail Arkhipov (Zhodino)

14 June 2000	Pinsk-900 (III)	w/o	Traktor Minsk (II)	Pinsk

== Round of 32 ==
The games were played in July 2000. Winners of the previous round were drawn against Premier League clubs. Two Premier League clubs (Gomel and Shakhtyor Soligorsk) advanced to the next round by a drawing of lots.

8 July 2000	Vertikal Kalinkovichi (III)	0–2	BATE Borisov	Kalinkovichi
17:00			Hancharyk 12'; Baha 19'	Stadium: City Stadium; Attendance: 3,500; Referee: Viktor Matyushev (Minsk)

12 July 2000	Baranovichi (III)	1–4	Dnepr-Transmash Mogilev	Baranovichi
17:00	Chuduk 38'		Solodukhin 27', 51'; T. Kalachev 34'; Chumachenko 55'	Stadium: Lokomotiv Stadium; Attendance: 4,000; Referee: Valeriy Petrovich (Minsk)

12 July 2000	Zvezda-VA-BGU Minsk (II)	1–2 (a.e.t.)	Torpedo-Kadino Mogilev	Minsk
17:00	Shushkevich 18'		Kuzmenok 3'; Harbachow 113'	Stadium: Kamvolschik Stadium; Attendance: 300; Referee: Yuriy Maistrov (Fanipol)

12 July 2000	Torpedo Zhodino (II)	1–2	Vedrich-97 Rechitsa	Smolevichi
17:00	Taran 34'		Panchenko 45'; Eramchuk 86'	Stadium: Central Stadium; Attendance: 500; Referee: Vladimir Sukhovarov (Orsha)

12 July 2000	Darida Minsk Raion (III)	1–2 (a.e.t.)	Dinamo Minsk	Dzerzhinsk
17:00	Levus 44'		Trepachkin 83'; Lyadzyanyow 95'	Stadium: City Stadium; Attendance: 2,500; Referee: Aleksandr Chebykin (Minsk)

12 July 2000	Veras Nesvizh (III)	2–8	Belshina Bobruisk	Nesvizh
17:30	Shpadaruk 65' (pen.); Pislyak 88'		Lanko 14', 68'; Demidchik 28', 37', 65'; Azarov 53'; Baltrushevich 54' (pen.); Belyay 73'	Stadium: Urozhay Stadium; Attendance: 3,000; Referee: Valeriy Semyonov (Minsk)

12 July 2000	Granit Mikashevichi (II)	1–0	Lida	Mikashevichi
17:30	Nikitochkin 20'			Stadium: Granit Stadium; Attendance: 2,000; Referee: Nikita Pyreyev (Minsk)

12 July 2000	Smorgon (III)	0–1	Dinamo Brest	Smorgon
17:30			Kavalyuk 9'	Stadium: City Stadium; Attendance: 3,200; Referee: Andrey Zhukov (Minsk)

12 July 2000	Ozertsy Glubokoye (III)	1–4	Neman-Belcard Grodno	Grodno
18:00	M. Borodavko 50'		Tarashchyk 9', 30', 41'; Polyakov 76'	Stadium: Neman Stadium; Attendance: 1,500; Referee: Valery Vyalichka (Minsk)

12 July 2000	Rogachev (II)	0–2	Lokomotiv-96 Vitebsk	Rogachev
18:00			Vekhtev 20'; Yeremeyev 88'	Stadium: DYuSSh Stadium; Attendance: 1,000; Referee: Kazimir Znaydinsky (Grodno)

12 July 2000	Vodokanal-Transit Brest (III)	0–8	Slavia Mozyr	Brest
18:00			Sļesarčuks 16', 42'; Lukashevich 32'; Denisyuk 47', 48', 53'; Martsinovich 51'; Strypeykis 75'	Stadium: OSK Brestsky; Attendance: 800; Referee: Oleg Chikun (Stolbtsy)

12 July 2000	Zabudova Chist (III)	1–0	Naftan-Devon Novopolotsk	Chist
18:00	Gulevich 34' (pen.)			Stadium: School Stadium; Attendance: 300; Referee: Gennady Yakubovsky (Minsk)

12 July 2000	Pinsk-900 (III)	0–1	Kommunalnik Slonim	Pinsk
18:00			Savitskiy 20'	Stadium: Pripyat Stadium; Attendance: 1,500; Referee: Aleksandr Ryomin (Minsk)

12 July 2000	Khimik Svetlogorsk (II)	0–5	Torpedo-MAZ Minsk	Svetlogorsk
18:00			Shvydakow 18', 63'; Novitskiy 42'; Yaromko 68'; Kukar 85'	Stadium: Khimik Stadium; Attendance: 2,800; Referee: Yuriy Kuntsevich (Grodno)

== Round of 16 ==
The games were played on 2 October 2000.

2 October 2000	Vedrich-97 Rechitsa	1–0	Dinamo Brest	Rechitsa
15:00	Parfyonaw 33'			Stadium: Central Stadium; Attendance: 1,200; Referee: Valeriy Petrovich (Minsk)

2 October 2000	Slavia Mozyr	4–1	Zabudova Chist (III)	Mozyr
16:00	Chaley 31', 63'; Strypeykis 40' (pen.); Karsakov 47'		Mlechko 21'	Stadium: Yunost Stadium; Attendance: 1,500; Referee: Viktor Matyushev (Minsk)

2 October 2000	Dnepr-Transmash Mogilev	0–1	BATE Borisov	Mogilev
16:00			Kutuzov 53'	Stadium: Spartak Stadium; Attendance: 2,200; Referee: Vladimir Sukhovarov (Orsha)

2 October 2000	Neman-Belcard Grodno	0–3	Belshina Bobruisk	Grodno
16:00			Baltrushevich 6'; I. Gradoboyev 22'; E. Gradoboyev 38'	Stadium: Neman Stadium; Attendance: 3,000; Referee: Sergey Shmolik (Brest)

2 October 2000	Torpedo-MAZ Minsk	0–1	Torpedo-Kadino Mogilev	Minsk
16:00			Lis 13'	Stadium: Torpedo Stadium; Attendance: 1,000; Referee: Yuriy Kuntsevich (Grodno)

2 October 2000	Kommunalnik Slonim	1–2	Shakhtyor Soligorsk	Slonim
16:00	A. Degil 12'		Tikhonchik 7'; Gavrilovich 15'	Stadium: Dinamo Stadium; Attendance: 2,000; Referee: Konstantin Daylid (Brest)

2 October 2000	Gomel	2–2 (a.e.t.) (7–6 p)	Lokomotiv-96 Vitebsk	Gomel
16:00	Borel 70'; Bliznyuk 82'		Abramaw 7'; Yeremeyev 42'	Stadium: Luch Stadium; Attendance: 3,000; Referee: Vadim Zhuk (Minsk)
	Penalties
	Yusipets (penalty scored); Trosko (penalty scored); Borel (penalty scored); Sysoyev (penalty scored); Demenkovets (penalty scored); Cherepnev (penalty scored); Bliznyuk (penalty scored)		(penalty scored) Kulanin; (penalty scored) Kuzminich; (penalty scored) Kosak; (penalty scored) Vekhtev; (penalty scored) Yeremeyev; (penalty scored) Beley; (penalty missed) A. Borodavko

2 October 2000	Dinamo Minsk	3–1	Granit Mikashevichi (II)	Minsk
17:00	Hrapkowski 7'; Lyadzyanyow 22'; Pchelintsev 70'		Nikitochkin 53'	Stadium: Dinamo Stadium; Attendance: 520; Referee: Yuriy Maistrov (Fanipol)

== Quarterfinals ==
The first legs were played on 20 April 2001. The second legs were played on 2 May 2001.

Team 1	Agg.	Team 2	1st leg	2nd leg
Shakhtyor Soligorsk	3–6	Dinamo Minsk	1–3	2–3
Gomel	3–5	Belshina Bobruisk	2–2	1–3
Vedrich-97 Rechitsa	4–0	Torpedo-Kadino Mogilev (II)	2–0	2–0
Slavia Mozyr	3–3 (a)	BATE Borisov	0–2	3–1

=== First leg ===
20 April 2001	Shakhtyor Soligorsk	1–3	Dinamo Minsk	Soligorsk
17:00	Nikifarenka 23'		Bespansky 24'; Hrapkowski 42'; Kachura 85' (pen.)	Stadium: Stroitel Stadium; Attendance: 3,000; Referee: Sergey Shmolik (Brest)

20 April 2001	Gomel	2–2	Belshina Bobruisk	Gomel
17:00	Shmykov 27'; Borel 42'		Sednyov 39'; Balashow 75'	Stadium: Luch Stadium; Attendance: 4,500; Referee: Vladimir Sukhovarov (Orsha)

20 April 2001	Vedrich-97 Rechitsa	2–0	Torpedo-Kadino Mogilev (II)	Rechitsa
17:30	Konovalov 28'; Nikonchuk 34'			Stadium: Central Stadium; Attendance: 4,200; Referee: Viktor Matyushev (Minsk)

20 April 2001	Slavia Mozyr	0–2	BATE Borisov	Mozyr
17:30			Lahun 41'; Hryharaw 80'	Stadium: Yunost Stadium; Attendance: 5,500; Referee: Andrey Zhukov (Minsk)

=== Second leg ===
2 May 2001	Dinamo Minsk	3–2 (6–3 agg.)	Shakhtyor Soligorsk	Minsk
17:00	Kachura 62'; Valadzyankow 72'; Lyadzyanyow 80'		Podrez 47'; Nikifarenka 59'	Stadium: Dinamo Stadium; Attendance: 2,300; Referee: Sergey Shmolik (Brest)

2 May 2001	Torpedo-Kadino Mogilev (II)	0–2 (0–4 agg.)	Vedrich-97 Rechitsa	Mogilev
17:00			Konovalov 68'; Dolinov 81'	Stadium: Torpedo Stadium; Attendance: 700; Referee: Viktor Matyushev (Minsk)

2 May 2001	Belshina Bobruisk	3–1 (5–3 agg.)	Gomel	Bobruisk
17:30	Sednyov 69'; Truhaw 80'; Balashow 90'		Bliznyuk 9'	Stadium: Spartak Stadium; Attendance: 2,500; Referee: Vladimir Sukhovarov (Orsha)

2 May 2001	BATE Borisov	1–3 (3–3 (a) agg.)	Slavia Mozyr	Borisov
17:30	Kutuzov 4'		Strypeykis 27', 52'; Pervushin 73'	Stadium: City Stadium; Attendance: 5,500; Referee: Andrey Zhukov (Minsk)

== Semifinals ==
The first legs were played on 10 May 2001. The second legs were played on 18 May 2001.

Team 1	Agg.	Team 2	1st leg	2nd leg
Belshina Bobruisk	1–1 (a)	Vedrich-97 Rechytsa	0–0	1–1
Dinamo Minsk	1–2	Slavia Mozyr	0–1	1–1

=== First leg ===
10 May 2001	Belshina Bobruisk	0–0	Vedrich-97 Rechitsa	Bobruisk
17:30				Stadium: Spartak Stadium; Attendance: 3,500; Referee: Vadim Zhuk (Minsk)

10 May 2001	Dinamo Minsk	0–1	Slavia Mozyr	Minsk
19:00			Chaley 19'	Stadium: Dinamo Stadium; Attendance: 3,000; Referee: Konstantin Daylid (Brest)

=== Second leg ===
18 May 2001	Vedrich-97 Rechitsa	1–1 (1–1 (a) agg.)	Belshina Bobruisk	Rechitsa
17:30	Konovalov 59' (pen.)		Karolik 87'	Stadium: Central Stadium; Attendance: 5,000; Referee: Vadim Zhuk (Minsk)

18 May 2001	Slavia Mozyr	1–1 (2–1 agg.)	Dinamo Minsk	Mozyr
18:00	Vasilyuk 80'		Valadzyankow 28'	Stadium: Yunost Stadium; Attendance: 5,000; Referee: Sergey Shmolik (Brest)

== Final ==
27 May 2001
17:00 UTC+3

Belshina Bobruisk	1–0 (a.e.t.)	Slavia Mozyr
E. Gradoboyev 96'	Report

Dinamo Stadium, Minsk
Attendance: 8,000
Referee: Vladimir Sukhovarov (Orsha)

BELSHINA:
GK	1	(Belarus) Valeri Shantalosau
SW	2	(Belarus) Aleksandr Sednyov
RB	8	(Belarus) Sergey Zenevich
CB	3	(Belarus) Yaroslav Sverdlov		(substituted off) 65'
LB	4	(Belarus) Vladimir Klimovich
DM	7	(Belarus) Eduard Gradoboyev
DM	6	(Belarus) Igor Gradoboyev (c)	(yellow card) 77'
RM	9	(Belarus) Dzyanis Karolik		(substituted off) 81'
LM	5	(Belarus) Alyaksandr Shahoyka
CAM	10	(Belarus) Ihar Truhaw
FW	11	(Belarus) Vitaliy Aleshchenko		(substituted off) 60'
Substitutes:
GK	16	(Belarus) Sergey Zhemchugov
FW	12	(Belarus) Sergey Vekhtev		(substituted on) 81'
FW	13	(Belarus) Dzmitry Balashow		(substituted on) 60'
DF	14	(Belarus) Andrei Khripach		(substituted on) 65'
MF	15	(Belarus) Vyacheslav Gormash
DF	17	(Belarus) Igor Shustikov
FW	18	(Belarus) Gennadiy Kashkar
Manager:
(Belarus) Vyacheslav Akshaev

SLAVIA:
GK	1	(Belarus) Vitaly Varivonchik
RB	5	(Russia) Denis Pervushin		(substituted off) 60'
CB	6	(Russia) Oleg Samatov (c)	(yellow card) 74'
LB	2	(Belarus) Vladimir Sorochinskiy
DM	18	(Federal Republic of Yugoslavia) Radojica Vasić
DM	3	(Belarus) Fedor Lukashenko
RM	9	(Belarus) Uladzimir Karytska
CM	4	(Federal Republic of Yugoslavia) Aleksandar Gruber
LM	7	(Belarus) Artur Matveychik
CAM	8	(Belarus) Dzmitry Chaley		(substituted off) 62'
FW	10	(Belarus) Raman Vasilyuk
Substitutes:
GK	16	(Belarus) Syarhey Sinitsyn
FW	11	(Belarus) Valery Strypeykis
DF	12	(Belarus) Andrey Lukashevich
FW	13	(Belarus) Alyaksandr Klimenka
DF	14	(Belarus) Igor Balin		(substituted on) 60'
DF	15	(Belarus) Ruslan Danilyuk
MF	17	(Russia) Igor Rakovskiy		(substituted on) 62'
Manager:
(Federal Republic of Yugoslavia) Vladimir Petrović
