= 1995–96 Belarusian Cup =

Tournament details
- Country: Belarus
- Teams: 32

Final positions
- Champions: MPKC Mozyr (1st title)
- Runners-up: Dinamo Minsk

Tournament statistics
- Matches played: 30
- Goals scored: 129 (4.3 per match)
- Top goal scorer(s): Sergey Yaromko (6 goals)

The 1995–96 Belarusian Cup was the fifth season of the annual Belarusian football cup competition. Contrary to the league season, it is conducted in a fall-spring rhythm. It began on 4 August 1995 with the first of five rounds and ended on 17 May 1996 with the final at the Dinamo Stadium in Minsk.

FC Dinamo-93 Minsk were the defending champions, having defeated FC Torpedo Mogilev in the 1995 final, but were knocked out in the semifinal by the eventual runners-up FC Dinamo Minsk.

FC MPKC Mozyr won the final against FC Dinamo Minsk to win their first title.

== Round of 32 ==
The games were played on 4, 5 and 6 August 1995.

Team 1	Score	Team 2
Kommunalnik Pinsk (II)	0–4	Dinamo Minsk
Fomalgaut Borisov (II)	0–0 (a.e.t.) (6–5 p)	Neman Grodno
Kimovets Vitebsk (II)	0–3	Dinamo-93 Minsk
Brestbytkhim Brest (II)	2–4	Molodechno
Transmash Mogilev (II)	0–1	Dinamo Brest
Khimik Svetlogorsk (II)	4–1	Torpedo Minsk
Gomel (II)	2–1	Dvina Vitebsk
Kardan-Flyers Grodno (II)	6–2	Obuvshchik Lida
Naftan-Devon Novopolotsk (II)	1–3	Ataka-Aura Minsk
Dinamo-Juni Minsk (II)	4–0	Shinnik Bobruisk
KPF Slonim (II)	3–0	Vedrich Rechitsa
Torpedo Zhodino (II)	1–8	MPKC Mozyr
Granit Mikashevichi (III)	1–6	Dnepr Mogilev
Stroitel Starye Dorogi (II)	0–3	Torpedo Mogilev
Lokomotiv Vitebsk (II)	0–1	Shakhtyor Soligorsk
Khimvolokno Grodno (II)	w/o	Bobruisk

== Round of 16 ==
The games were played on 31 August and 1 September 1995.

Team 1	Score	Team 2
Ataka-Aura Minsk	2–0	Dinamo-Juni Minsk (II)
Dinamo Minsk	4–0	Khimik Svetlogorsk (II)
MPKC Mozyr	2–1	Dnepr Mogilev (II)
Dinamo-93 Minsk	7–1	Khimvolokno Grodno (II)
Dinamo Brest	1–4	Molodechno
Torpedo Mogilev	0–1	Gomel (II)
Shakhtyor Soligorsk	2–1	Kardan-Flyers Grodno (II)
KPF Slonim (II)	1–4	Fomalgaut Borisov (II)

== Quarterfinals ==
The games were played on 22 October, 3 November 1995 and 28 April 1996.

Team 1	Score	Team 2
Molodechno	0–1	Dinamo-93 Minsk
Shakhtyor Soligorsk	2–3	MPKC Mozyr
Gomel (II)	0–4	Ataka-Aura Minsk
Dinamo Minsk	3–1	Fomalgaut Borisov (II)

== Semifinals ==
The games were played on 9 May 1996.

Team 1	Score	Team 2
MPKC Mozyr	5–4	Ataka-Aura Minsk
Dinamo-93 Minsk	0–4	Dinamo Minsk

== Final ==
The final match was played on 17 May 1996 at the Dinamo Stadium in Minsk.

17 May 1996
18:00 UTC+3

Dinamo Minsk	1–4	MPKC Mozyr
Charnyawski 65'	Report	Romaschenko 43'; Yaromko 44', 79'; Konovalov 89'

Dinamo Stadium, Minsk
Attendance: 7,600
Referee: Yevgeny Serezhkin (Mogilev)

Dinamo Minsk	MPKC Mozyr

DINAMO:
GK	1	(Belarus) Vitaly Varivonchik		(substituted off) 46'
DF	2	(Belarus) Syarhey Yaskovich
DF	3	(Belarus) Andrey Astrowski
DF	5	(Belarus) Alyaksandr Khatskevich	(red card) 85'
DF	6	(Belarus) Alyaksandar Lukhvich	(yellow card) 76'
MF	4	(Belarus) Andrei Lavrik
MF	7	(Belarus) Aleh Charnyawski
MF	8	(Belarus) Mihail Makowski		(substituted off) 87'
MF	9	(Belarus) Valyantsin Byalkevich
FW	10	(Belarus) Uladzimir Makowski		(substituted off) 74'
FW	11	(Belarus) Pyotr Kachura
Substitutes:
GK	12	(Belarus) Aleksandr Yevnevich		(substituted on) 46'
FW	13	(Belarus) Pavel Shavrov		(substituted on) 74'
MF	14	(Belarus) Antuan Mayorov		(substituted on) 87'
DF	15	(Belarus) Dmitry Makarenko
DF	16	(Belarus) Andrey Downar
Manager:
(Belarus) Ivan Schokin

MPKC:
GK	1	(Belarus) Yury Svirkov	(yellow card) 44'
DF	2	(Belarus) Aleksandr Sednev	(yellow card) 59'
DF	3	(Belarus) Vyacheslav Levchuk
DF	4	(Belarus) Vladimir Golmak
DF	6	(Belarus) Andrei Khripach		(substituted off) 46'
MF	5	(Belarus) Andrey Skorobogatko		(substituted off) 74'
MF	7	(Belarus) Alyaksandr Kulchiy
MF	8	(Belarus) Maksim Romaschenko		(substituted off) 46'
MF	9	(Belarus) Sergey Gomonov
MF	10	(Belarus) Barys Haravoy
FW	11	(Belarus) Sergey Yaromko
Substitutes:
FW	12	(Ukraine) Volodymyr Konovalov	(yellow card) 60'	(substituted on) 46'
DF	13	(Belarus) Oleg Sysoyev		(substituted on) 34'
MF	14	(Belarus) Sergey Terekhov
MF	15	(Belarus) Dmitry Denisyuk		(substituted on) 74'
GK	16	(Belarus) Uladzimir Haew
Manager:
(Belarus) Anatoly Yurevich
