= Sergey Vekhtev =

Belarusian footballer and coach

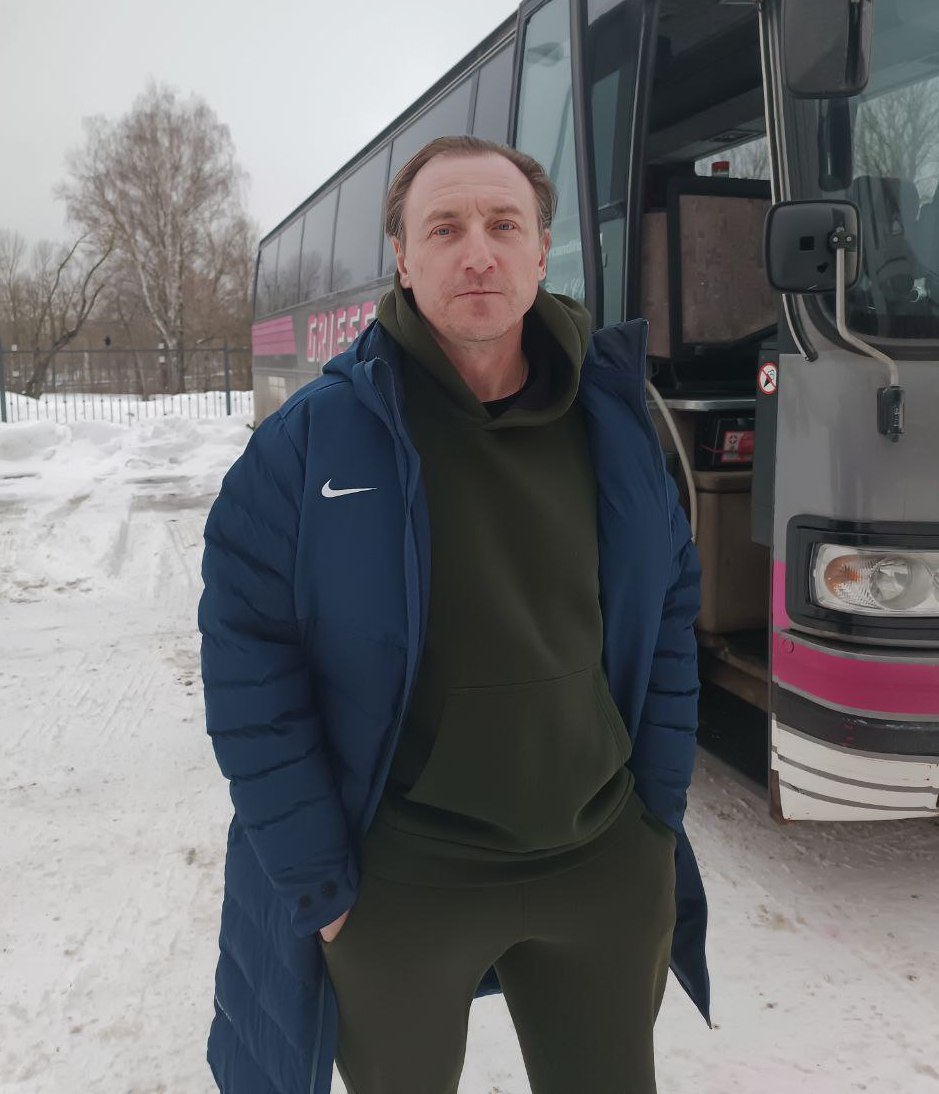

Personal information
- Date of birth: 8 May 1971 (age 55)
- Place of birth: Smolensk, USSR
- Height: 1.87 m (6 ft 1 1/2 in)
- Position: Forward

Team information
- Current team: Vitebsk (women's manager)

Youth career
- 1989–1991: KIM Vitebsk

Senior career*
Years	Team	Apps	(Gls)
1992–1995	Dvina Vitebsk	104	(30)
1995–1997	Borussia Dortmund	0	(0)
1995–1996	→ Borussia Dortmund II	11	(0)
1996–1997	→ TSG Dülmen (loan)	26	(4)
1997	Baltika Kaliningrad	4	(0)
1998	Lokomotiv-96 Vitebsk	26	(9)
1999	Wuhan Hongtao	7	(1)
2000	Lokomotiv-96 Vitebsk	27	(9)
2001	Belshina Bobruisk	13	(2)
2002–2003	Naftan Novopolotsk	46	(12)
2004	Slavia Mozyr	13	(0)
2004	→ Torpedo-Kadino Mogilev (loan)	11	(5)
2005–2006	Lokomotiv Vitebsk	38	(13)
2009	Myasokombinat Vitebsk	3	(1)
2009	Vitebsk	1	(0)
2013	Vitebsk	9	(0)

International career
1993–1996	Belarus	4	(0)

Managerial career
- 2007–2014: Vitebsk (assistant)
- 2014–2015: Vitebsk
- 2015–2018: Vitebsk (reserves)
- 2018–2019: Orsha
- 2021–2022: Peresvet Podolsk
- 2022–2023: Elektron Veliky Novgorod
- 2023–: Vitebsk (women's)
- * Club domestic league appearances and goals

Sergey Vekhtev (Belarusian: Сяргей Вехцеў, romanized: Syarhey Vekhtsew; Russian: Сергей Вехтев; born 8 May 1971) is a Belarusian professional football coach and former player.

== Career ==
In 1995, Vekhtev signed for Borussia Dortmund.

== Honours ==
Lokomotiv-96 Vitebsk

- Belarusian Cup winner: 1997–98

Belshina Bobruisk

- Belarusian Premier League champion: 2001
- Belarusian Cup winner: 2000–01
