= Yaroslav Sverdlov =

Belarusian footballer (born 1968)

Personal information
- Full name: Yaroslav Garrievich Sverdlov
- Date of birth: 11 June 1968 (age 58)
- Place of birth: Belarusian SSR
- Height: 1.76 m (5 ft 9 in)
- Position: Midfielder

Senior career*
Years	Team	Apps	(Gls)
1986	Dnepr Mogilev	1	(0)
1987–1988	Shinnik Bobruisk		
1989–1990	Selmash Mogilev		(9)
1991–1993	Torpedo Mogilev	37	(3)
1993–1999	Dnepr-Transmash Mogilev	182	(3)
2000–2001	Belshina Bobruisk	39	(0)
2002	Torpedo-Kadino Mogilev	28	(2)
- * Club domestic league appearances and goals

Yaroslav Garriyevich Sverdlov (Russian: Ярослав Гарриевич Свердлов; born 11 June 1968) is a Belarusian former footballer who played as a midfielder.

== Career ==
In 1993, Svedlov signed for Belarusian top flight side Dnepr, where he made 182 league appearances and scored 3 goals, helping them win their only league title. Before the 2000 season, he signed for Belshina in the Belarusian top flight, helping them win their only league title. Before the 2002 season, Svedlov signed for Belarusian second-tier club Torpedo (Mogilev).

After retirement, he left professional football, but continues playing for veteran teams.

=== Honours ===
Dnepr-Transmash Mogilev

- Belarusian Premier League champion: 1998

Belshina Bobruisk

- Belarusian Premier League champion: 2001
- Belarusian Cup winner: 2000–01
