= Dzyanis Karolik =

Belarusian footballer

Personal information
- Date of birth: 7 May 1979 (age 47)
- Place of birth: Zhodino, Byelorussian SSR, Soviet Union
- Height: 1.79 m (5 ft 10 1/2 in)
- Position: Striker

Team information
- Current team: Torpedo-BelAZ Zhodino (caretaker manager)

Senior career*
| Years | Team | Apps | (Gls) |
| 1997–1999 | Torpedo Zhodino | 64 | (27) |
| 2000–2002 | Belshina Bobruisk | 78 | (19) |
| 2003–2005 | Torpedo Zhodino | 48 | (7) |
| 2006 | Gomel | 23 | (2) |
| 2007 | Naftan Novopolotsk | 14 | (2) |
| 2008 | Darida Minsk Raion | 28 | (7) |
| 2009 | Belshina Bobruisk | 16 | (5) |
| 2010 | Torpedo Zhodino | 23 | (1) |
| 2011 | Gorodeya | 7 | (0) |
| 2011 | Slutsk | 11 | (1) |
| 2012 | Smorgon | 12 | (0) |

International career
| 2001 | Belarus U21 | 2 | (0) |

Managerial career
- 2026–: Torpedo-BelAZ Zhodino (caretaker)
- * Club domestic league appearances and goals as of 31 January 2013

Dzyanis Karolik (Belarusian: Дзяніс Каролік; Russian: Денис Каролик; born 7 May 1979) is a retired Belarusian professional football player. His latest club was Smorgon.

== Career ==
Born in Zhodino, Karolik has played professional football in the Belarusian Premier League with FC Belshina Bobruisk, FC Torpedo Zhodino, FC Gomel, FC Naftan Novopolotsk and FC Darida Minsk Raion. He won the league with Belshina Bobriusk.

== Honours ==
Belshina Bobruisk

- Belarusian Premier League champion: 2001
- Belarusian Cup winner: 2000–01
