= Andrei Khripach =

Belarusian footballer and coach

Personal information
- Full name: Andrei Mihailavich Khripach
- Date of birth: 28 May 1972 (age 54)
- Place of birth: Zhodino, Minsk Oblast, Belarusian SSR, Soviet Union
- Position: Defender

Team information
- Current team: Belshina Bobruisk (assistant manager)

Youth career
- –1992: Traktor Bobruisk

Senior career*
Years	Team	Apps	(Gls)
1992–1994	Fandok Bobruisk	83	(7)
1994–1996	MPKC Mozyr	8	(0)
1996–2002	Belshina Bobruisk	165	(13)
2003–2004	Baranovichi	52	(10)
2005	Dnepr Rogachev	25	(2)

International career
1994–1997	Belarus	4	(0)

Managerial career
- 2009–2017: Belshina Bobruisk (coach)
- 2018: Viktoriya Maryina Gorka
- 2019: Belshina-2 Bobruisk
- 2020: Viktoriya Maryina Gorka
- 2020–: Belshina Bobruisk (assistant)
- * Club domestic league appearances and goals

Andrei Mihailavich Khripach (Russian: Андрей Хрипач; born 28 May 1972) is a Belarusian professional football coach and former player.

== Career ==
Born in Zhodino, Khripach began playing professional football with FC Fandok Bobruisk in 1992. He joined FC MPKC Mozyr in 1994, where he would win the Belarusian Cup in 1996. He moved to FC Belshina Bobruisk in 1996, and would play seven seasons for Belshina, winning three Belarusian Cup and one Belarusian Premier League titles.

Khripach would finish his career playing for FC Baranovichi and FC Dnepr Rogachev. He appeared in more than 250 Belarusian league matches during his career, scoring 20 goals.

Khripach made four appearances for the Belarus national football team, all of them friendlies. His debut was as a second-half substitute in a friendly against Ukraine in 1994.

== Honours ==
MPKC Mozyr

- Belarusian Premier League champion: 1996
- Belarusian Cup winner: 1995–96

Belshina Bobruisk

- Belarusian Premier League champion: 2001
- Belarusian Cup winner: 1996–97, 1998–99, 2000–01
