= Igor Trukhov =

Belarusian footballer and coach

Personal information
- Full name: Igor Vladimirovich Trukhov
- Date of birth: 19 August 1976 (age 50)
- Place of birth: Vitebsk, Byelorussian SSR, Soviet Union
- Height: 1.72 m (5 ft 7 1/2 in)
- Position: Midfielder

Team information
- Current team: Arsenal Dzerzhinsk (assistant manager)

Youth career
- 1993–1995: Kimovets Vitebsk

Senior career*
Years	Team	Apps	(Gls)
1993–1995	Kimovets Vitebsk	45	(3)
1996–1997	Lokomotiv Vitebsk	21	(4)
1997–2000	Lokomotiv-96 Vitebsk	62	(16)
1998	→ Lokomotiv Vitebsk	20	(5)
2001–2002	Belshina Bobruisk	46	(1)
2003–2005	Torpedo Zhodino	80	(18)
2006–2009	Naftan Novopolotsk	96	(10)
2010	Vitebsk	32	(2)
2011	Torpedo-BelAZ Zhodino	28	(1)
2012	Naftan Novopolotsk	24	(1)
2013	Vitebsk	12	(1)
2013–2016	Granit Mikashevichi	83	(6)
2016	Naftan Novopolotsk	15	(3)
2017	Smolevichi-STI	30	(2)

Managerial career
- 2017: Smolevichi-STI (assistant)
- 2018–2019: BATE Borisov (youth)
- 2021–2023: Smorgon
- 2025: Belshina Bobruisk
- 2026–: Arsenal Dzerzhinsk (assistant)
- * Club domestic league appearances and goals

Igor Vladimirovich Trukhov (Belarusian: Ігар Уладзіміравіч Трухаў; Russian: Игорь Владимирович Трухов; born 19 August 1976) is a Belarusian professional football coach and former player.

== Career ==
Trukhov never suffered serious injuries throughout his playing career.

== Honours ==
Belshina Bobruisk

- Belarusian Premier League champion: 2001
- Belarusian Cup winner: 2000–01

Naftan Novopolotsk

- Belarusian Cup winner: 2008–09, 2011–12
