= Sergey Zenevich =

Belarusian footballer and manager

Personal information
- Full name: Sergey Leonidovich Zenevich
- Date of birth: 23 January 1976 (age 50)
- Place of birth: Minsk, Belarusian SSR
- Position: Defender

Team information
- Current team: Alashkert (assistant coach)

Senior career*
Years	Team	Apps	(Gls)
1993–1997	Ataka Minsk	129	(3)
1998	BATE Borisov	4	(0)
1998	→ Kommunalnik Slonim (loan)	14	(0)
1999–2000	Sheriff Tiraspol	8	(0)
2001	Belshina Bobruisk	21	(0)
2002–2005	Torpedo Zhodino	109	(0)
2006	Lokomotiv Vitebsk	20	(0)
2007	Darida Minsk Raion	6	(0)
2007	Belshina Bobruisk	9	(0)
2009–2011	Rudensk	63	(0)
2011	Vedrich-97 Rechitsa	12	(0)

Managerial career
- 2012–2013: Slavia Mozyr (assistant)
- 2014–2018: BATE Borisov (youth)
- 2019–2021: Torpedo-BelAZ Zhodino (assistant)
- 2019: → Torpedo-BelAZ Zhodino (caretaker)
- 2021: Torpedo-BelAZ Zhodino
- 2022–2023: BATE Borisov (assistant)
- 2022: BATE Borisov (caretaker)
- 2023–2024: Alashkert (assistant)
- 2024–2025: Veles Moscow (assistant)
- 2025–: Alashkert (assistant)
- * Club domestic league appearances and goals

Sergey Zenevich (Belarusian: Сяргей Зяневіч; Russian: Сергей Зеневич; known until 1999 as Sergey Kozlovskiy (Belarusian: Сяргей Казлоўскі; Russian: Сергей Козловский); born 23 January 1976) is a Belarusian professional football manager and former player.

== Honours ==
=== Player ===
Sheriff Tiraspol

- Moldovan Cup: 1998–99

Belshina Bobruisk

- Belarusian Premier League: 2001
- Belarusian Cup: 2000–01
