= Syarhey Kuzminich =

Belarusian footballer and coach

Personal information
- Date of birth: 29 January 1977 (age 49)
- Place of birth: Senno, Vitebsk Oblast, Belarusian SSR
- Height: 1.79 m (5 ft 10 1/2 in)
- Position: Defender

Senior career*
| Years | Team | Apps | (Gls) |
| 1994–1995 | Stroitel Vitebsk | 14 | (0) |
| 1995 | Lokomotiv Vitebsk | 10 | (0) |
| 1997–1998 | Torpedo-Kadino Mogilev | 48 | (4) |
| 1999–2001 | Lokomotiv-96 Vitebsk | 72 | (11) |
| 1999–2000 | → Lokomotiv Vitebsk | 7 | (1) |
| 2002–2003 | Darida Minsk Raion | 51 | (7) |
| 2004 | Naftan Novopolotsk | 22 | (1) |
| 2005–2006 | Lokomotiv Vitebsk | 45 | (3) |
| 2007 | Torpedo Zhodino | 10 | (0) |
| 2007–2008 | Vitebsk | 37 | (2) |
| 2009 | Torpedo Zhodino | 8 | (0) |
| 2009 | Vitebsk | 11 | (0) |
| 2010 | Gomel | 27 | (1) |

Managerial career
- 2010–2012: Gomel (assistant)
- 2013–2014: Zimbru Chișinău (assistant)
- 2016: Belshina Bobruisk (reserves)
- 2017–2019: Dinamo Brest (youth)
- 2019–2020: Krumkachy Minsk
- 2021: Minsk (assistant)
- 2021: → Minsk (caretaker)
- 2022: Naftan Novopolotsk (assistant)
- 2023: Dnepr Mogilev (assistant)
- * Club domestic league appearances and goals

Syarhey Kuzminich (Belarusian: Сяргей Кузьмініч; Russian: Серге́й Кузьминич; born 29 January 1977) is a retired Belarusian professional football coach and former player.

== Honours ==
Gomel

- Belarusian Cup winner: 2010–11
