= Sergey Mikhaylov =

Sergey Mikhaylov may refer to:

- Sergey Mihaylov (born 1976), Uzbek boxer
- Sergey Mikhailov (politician) (born 1965), Russian politician
- Sergei Mikhailov (businessman) (born 1958), Russian businessman
- Sergei Mikhailov (footballer, born 1963), Russian footballer
- Sergey Mikhaylov (footballer, born 1978), Belarusian footballer
- Sergei Mikhailov (footballer, born 1983), Russian footballer
- Sergei Mikhailov (journalist), Russian journalist, director of TASS 2012–2023

== See also ==
- Mikhaylov (disambiguation)
