= Dzmitry Balashow =

Belarusian footballer

Personal information
- Date of birth: 8 January 1974 (age 52)
- Place of birth: Minsk, Soviet Union
- Height: 1.77 m (5 ft 9 1/2 in)
- Position: Forward

Senior career*
Years	Team	Apps	(Gls)
1992	Torpedo Minsk	21	(1)
1992–1995	KPF Slonim	80	(27)
1994	→ Obuvschik Lida (loan)	5	(2)
1996	Torpedo Minsk	9	(2)
1997–1998	Belshina Bobruisk	58	(29)
1999	Arsenal Tula	31	(0)
2000–2001	Belshina Bobruisk	31	(11)
2002	Shakhtyor Soligorsk	12	(0)
2002	Khimik Svetlogorsk	13	(1)
2003	Belshina Bobruisk	7	(0)
2003–2004	Baranovichi	27	(8)
2004	Osipovichi	8	(7)
2005	Dnepr-DUSSh-1 Rogachev	26	(5)
2008	Osipovichi	18	(4)

International career
1992	Belarus U21	2	(0)
1997–1999	Belarus	6	(0)
- * Club domestic league appearances and goals

Dzmitry Balashow (Belarusian: Дзмiтрый Балашоў; Russian: Дмитрий Анатольевич Балашов; born 8 January 1974) is a retired Belarusian professional footballer. After retiring, he worked as a car mechanic.

== Honours ==
Belshina Bobruisk

- Belarusian Premier League champion: 2001
- Belarusian Cup winner: 1996–97, 2000–01
