= Eduard Gradoboyev =

Belarusian footballer and coach

Personal information
- Date of birth: 28 September 1971 (age 55)
- Place of birth: Gomel, Belarusian SSR
- Height: 1.80 m (5 ft 11 in)
- Position: Midfielder

Senior career*
Years	Team	Apps	(Gls)
1989–1990	Gomselmash Gomel	18	(1)
1990–1991	Iskra Smolensk	11	(1)
1992–1994	Fandok Bobruisk	45	(4)
1995–2005	Belshina Bobruisk	267	(22)

Managerial career
- 2006–2007: Belshina Bobruisk (assistant)
- 2008: Belshina Bobruisk
- 2009–2016: Belshina Bobruisk (youth)
- 2017: Belshina Bobruisk (caretaker)
- 2017–2018: Belshina Bobruisk (assistant)
- 2018–2019: Belshina Bobruisk
- 2019: Belshina Bobruisk (assistant)
- 2019–2020: Belshina Bobruisk
- * Club domestic league appearances and goals

Eduard Gradoboyev (Belarusian: Эдуард Градабоеў; Russian: Эдуард Градобоев; born 28 September 1971) is a Belarusian association football coach and former player. He spent his entire coaching career in Belshina Bobruisk, working at various positions including youth coach, assistant, and head coach.

== Family ==
Eduard Gradoboyev's twin brother Igor Gradoboyev was also a professional footballer. The brothers spent their entire playing careers alongside each other. Igor died in 2013.

Eduard 's son Dmitriy Gradoboyev also became professional footballer.

== Honours ==
Belshina Bobruisk

- Belarusian Premier League champion: 2001
- Belarusian Cup winner: 1996–97, 1998–99, 2000–01
