= Sergey Mikhaylov (footballer, born 1978) =

Belarusian footballer and coach

Personal information
- Date of birth: 8 June 1978 (age 48)
- Place of birth: Minsk, Belarusian SSR
- Height: 1.90 m (6 ft 3 in)
- Position: Goalkeeper

Team information
- Current team: Wisła Kraków II (goalkeeping coach)

Youth career
- 1996–1998: AFViS-RShVSM Minsk

Senior career*
Years	Team	Apps	(Gls)
1996–1998	AFViS-RShVSM Minsk	39	(0)
1999–2000	Svisloch-Krovlya Osipovichi	16	(0)
2000–2001	Belshina Bobruisk	8	(0)
2002–2003	MTZ-RIPO Minsk	9	(0)
2003–2004	Molodechno-2000	22	(0)
2004–2005	Smorgon	17	(0)
2005	Vedrich-97 Rechitsa	14	(0)
2006–2009	Veras Nesvizh	71	(0)
2010–2014	Slutsk	90	(0)
- * Club domestic league appearances and goals

Sergey Mikhaylov (Belarusian: Сяргей Міхайлаў; Russian: Сергей Михайлов; born 8 June 1978) is a Belarusian former professional footballer who played as a goalkeeper. Following retirement, he became a goalkeeping coach for Slutsk in 2015. Since 2016, he's been working with numerous teams of Wisła Kraków, and is the current goalkeeping coach of their reserve team.

== Honours ==
Belshina Bobruisk

- Belarusian Premier League: 2001
- Belarusian Cup: 2000–01
