= Alyaksandr Shahoyka =

Belarusian footballer

Personal information
- Full name: Alyaksandr Alyaksandravich Shahoyka
- Date of birth: 27 July 1980 (age 46)
- Place of birth: Minsk, Belarusian SSR, Soviet Union
- Height: 1.81 m (5 ft 11 in)
- Position: Defender

Team information
- Current team: Dinamo Minsk (manager)

Youth career
- SDYuShOR-5 Minsk

Senior career*
Years	Team	Apps	(Gls)
1998	Real Minsk	1	(0)
1999–2002	Belshina Bobruisk	88	(4)
2003–2007	Gomel	130	(2)
2008–2009	Kryvbas Kryvyi Rih	29	(0)
2009–2010	Gomel	11	(0)
2010	→ Belshina Bobruisk (loan)	6	(0)
2011–2015	Belshina Bobruisk	143	(2)
2016–2019	Isloch Minsk Raion	98	(6)

International career
1999–2001	Belarus U21	13	(0)
2006	Belarus	2	(0)

Managerial career
- 2020–2021: ABFF Academy (coach)
- 2022: Isloch Minsk Raion (assistant)
- 2023: Arsenal Dzerzhinsk (assistant)
- 2023–2025: Energetik-BGU Minsk (assistant)
- 2025: Maxline Vitebsk
- 2026–: Dinamo Minsk
- * Club domestic league appearances and goals

Alyaksandr Alyaksandravich Shahoyka (Belarusian: Аляксандр Аляксандравіч Шагойка, Russian: Александр Александрович Шагойко; born 27 July 1980) is a Belarusian professional football manager and former player. He is the manager of Belarusian Premier League club Dinamo Minsk.

== International career ==
Shahoyka made his debut for Belarus on 1 March 2006 in the match against Finland during the friendly Cyprus International Football Tournament.

== Honours ==
Belshina Bobruisk

- Belarusian Premier League: 2001
- Belarusian Cup: 2000–01

Gomel

- Belarusian Premier League: 2003
