= Sergey Gomonov =

Soviet and Belarusian footballer and coach

Personal information
- Full name: Sergey Anatolyevich Gomonov
- Date of birth: 29 June 1961
- Date of death: 19 September 2010 (aged 49)
- Height: 1.75 m (5 ft 9 in)
- Position: Defender

Senior career*
Years	Team	Apps	(Gls)
1979–1981	Dinamo Brest	112	(8)
1982–1983	Dinamo Minsk	0	(0)
1983–1986	Dnepr Mogilev	118	(37)
1987–1990	Dinamo Minsk	83	(4)
1991	Amirani Ochamchire	13	(5)
1992	Metallurg Molodechno	29	(4)
1992–1994	Temp Shepetivka	76	(3)
1995–1996	MPKC Mozyr	40	(8)
1997–1998	Vedrich-97 Rechitsa	24	(2)

Managerial career
- 2003–2005: Zvezda-BGU Minsk (assistant)
- 2005–2010: Zvezda-BGU Minsk
- 2010: Vedrich-97 Rechitsa
- * Club domestic league appearances and goals

Sergey Gomonov (Belarusian: Сяргей Гоманаў (Syarhey Homanaw), Russian: Серге́й Гомонов; 29 June 1961 – 19 September 2010) was a Soviet and Belarusian footballer and later a coach.

== Honours ==
MPKC Mozyr

- Belarusian Premier League champion: 1996
- Belarusian Cup champion: 1995–96
