= Valeri Shantalosau =

Belarusian footballer (born 1966)

Valerij Shantalosau
Personal information
- Full name: Valerij Dzmitryevich Shantalosau
- Date of birth: 15 March 1966 (age 60)
- Place of birth: Mogilev, Belarusian SSR, Soviet Union
- Height: 1.93 m (6 ft 4 in)
- Position: Goalkeeper

Youth career
- 1984: Dinamo Minsk

Senior career*
Years	Team	Apps	(Gls)
1985–1986	Dnepr Mogilev	24	(0)
1988	Zvejnieks Liepāja	18	(0)
1988–1989	Daugava Rīga	40	(0)
1990–1995	Lokomotiv Nizhny Novgorod	157	(0)
1996–1997	Baltika Kaliningrad	31	(0)
1998	Torpedo Moscow	2	(0)
1999–2000	Lokomotiv Nizhny Novgorod	38	(0)
2001	Belshina Bobruisk	25	(0)
2002	Torpedo-MAZ Minsk	25	(0)
2003–2005	Tobol Kostanay	74	(0)

International career
1992–2002	Belarus	26	(0)

Managerial career
- 2008: Sibir Novosibirsk (assistant)
- 2010–2011: Krylia Sovetov Samara (assistant)
- 2011–2013: Fakel Voronezh (assistant)
- 2013–2014: Sibir-2 Novosibirsk (assistant)
- 2015: Sokol Saratov (assistant)
- 2015–2016: Khimki (GK coach)
- 2016–2017: Baltika Kaliningrad (GK coach)
- 2017–2018: Torpedo Moscow (GK coach)
- 2019–2020: Chayka Peschanokopskoye (GK coach)
- 2020: Krasny (GK coach)
- 2021–2023: Dynamo Makhachkala (GK coach)
- * Club domestic league appearances and goals

Valerij Dzmitryevich Shantalosau (Belarusian: Валерий Дзьмітрыевіч Шанталосаў; Russian: Валерий Дмитриевич Шанталосов; born 15 March 1966) is a Belarusian professional football coach and former player.

== Club career ==
Shantalosau made his professional debut in the Soviet Second League in 1985 for FC Dnepr Mogilev.

On 19 December 2008, the Football Federation of Belarus declared Shantalosau persona non grata and disqualified him for trying to fix two UEFA Euro 2004 qualification games of the Belarus national football team - against the Czech Republic and Moldova. The football federation also asked FIFA to extend his disqualification worldwide.

== International career ==
Shantalosau was capped for Belarus 26 times between 1992 and 2002. Before that, he was called up for Russia once, but did not debut.

== Honours ==
Belshina Bobruisk

- Belarusian Premier League: 2001
- Belarusian Cup: 2000–01
