= Mark-Frederick Addo =

Belarusian footballer (born 1981)

Personal information
- Date of birth: 19 August 1981 (age 45)
- Place of birth: Minsk, Belarusian SSR
- Height: 1.84 m (6 ft 0 in)
- Position: Midfielder

Senior career*
Years	Team	Apps	(Gls)
1999	Molodechno	0	(0)
2000–2001	Lokomotiv Moscow	0	(0)
2000	→ Lokomotiv-2 Moscow	23	(2)
2002–2003	Slavia Mozyr	20	(0)
2003–2004	Belshina Bobruisk	10	(1)
2004	Dnepr-DYuSSh-1 Rogachev	16	(3)
2005	Torpedo-Kadino Mogilev	28	(1)
2007–2008	Baranovichi	21	(0)
- * Club domestic league appearances and goals

Mark-Frederick Addo (Russian: Марк-Фредерик Аддо; born 19 August 1981) is a Belarusian former footballer.

== Early life ==
Addo was born in 1981 in Belarus. He was born to a Ghanaian father and a Belarusian mother.

== Career ==
Addo started his career with the Belarusian side Molodechno. In 2000, he signed for Russian side Lokomotiv-2. In 2002, he signed for the Belarusian side Slavia. In 2003, he signed for the Belarusian side Belshina. In 2004, he signed for the Belarusian side Dnepr-DYuSSh-1 Rogachev. In 2005, he signed for Belarusian side Torpedo Mogilev. In 2006, he signed for Belarusian side Baranovichi. He retired from professional football at the age of 24.

== Personal life ==
After retiring from professional football, Addo worked as a bartender. He served in the Belarusian military.
