= Pchelintsev =

Pchelintsev (Russian: Пчелинцев) is a surname. It may refer to:

- Alexey Pchelintsev (born 1991), Kazakhstani ski jumper
- Denis Pchelintsev (born 1979), Russian football player and coach
- Valeri Pchelintsev (born 1976), Russian football player
- Vladimir Pchelintsev (born 1919), Soviet sniper
- Yevgeni Pchelintsev (born 1976), Russian football player
