= Aleksandr Sednyov =

Belarusian footballer and manager

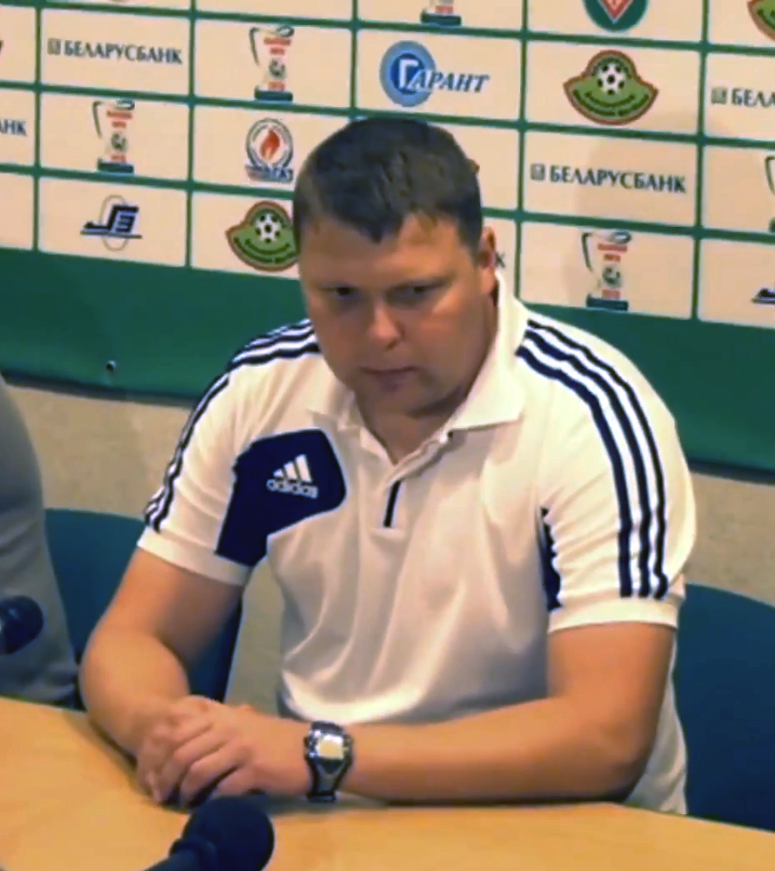

Personal information
- Date of birth: 16 August 1973 (age 53)
- Place of birth: Mogilev, Belarusian SSR, Soviet Union
- Height: 1.89 m (6 ft 2 1/2 in)
- Position: Defender

Team information
- Current team: Dinamo Brest (manager)

Senior career*
| Years | Team | Apps | (Gls) |
| 1991 | Dnepr Mogilev | 9 | (0) |
| 1992–1995 | Torpedo Mogilev | 91 | (1) |
| 1995 | Chernomorets Novorossiysk | 5 | (0) |
| 1996–1997 | MPKC Mozyr | 34 | (3) |
| 1997 | Transmash Mogilev | 13 | (0) |
| 1998–1999 | Baltika Kaliningrad | 33 | (3) |
| 1999–2000 | Torpedo-MAZ Minsk | 45 | (9) |
| 2001–2002 | Belshina Bobruisk | 39 | (10) |
| 2003 | BATE Borisov | 6 | (0) |
| 2003–2005 | Naftan Novopolotsk | 67 | (2) |
| Total | | 322 | (28) |

International career
| 1992–1995 | Belarus U21 | 8 | (0) |

Managerial career
- 2006–2008: Savit Mogilev
- 2009–2011: Belshina Bobruisk
- 2011–2012: Dinamo Minsk
- 2012–2015: Belshina Bobruisk
- 2016–2017: Dnepr Mogilev
- 2018–2019: Aktobe (assistant)
- 2019: Aktobe
- 2019–2020: Rukh Brest
- 2021–2024: Ordabasy
- 2025–: Dinamo Brest
- * Club domestic league appearances and goals

Aleksandr Sednyov (Belarusian: Аляксандр Сяднёў; Russian: Александр Седнёв; born 16 August 1973) is a Belarusian association football coach and former defender. He is the manager of Dinamo Brest.

== Honours ==
MPKC Mozyr

- Belarusian Premier League champion: 1996
- Belarusian Cup winner: 1995–96

Belshina Bobruisk

- Belarusian Premier League champion: 2001
- Belarusian Cup winner: 2000–01
