= Vladimir Golmak =

Belarusian footballer and coach

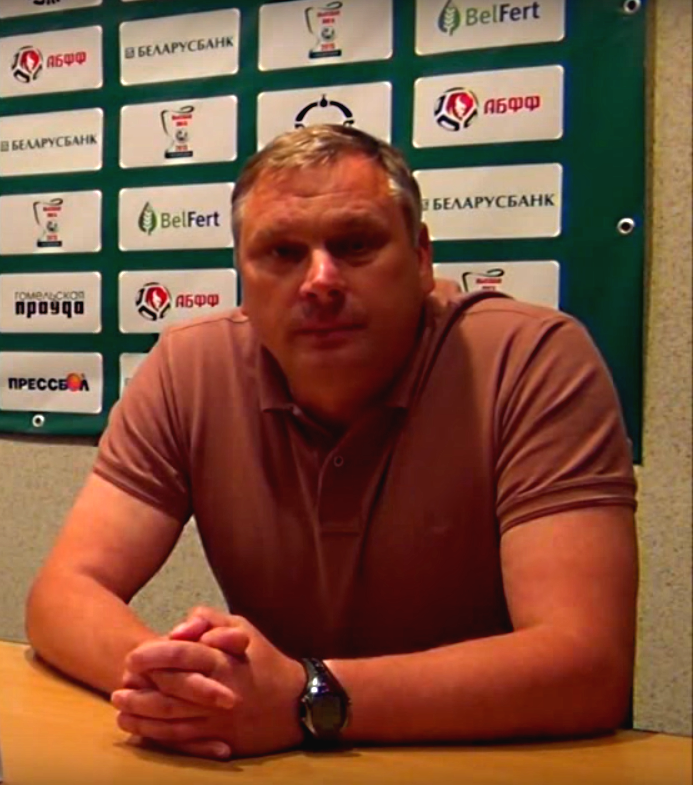
- Golmak in 2015

Personal information
- Date of birth: 11 October 1966 (age 60)
- Place of birth: Bobruisk, Byelorussian SSR, Soviet Union
- Height: 1.85 m (6 ft 1 in)
- Position: Defender

Team information
- Current team: Shakhtyor Soligorsk (U19 head coach)

Senior career*
| Years | Team | Apps | (Gls) |
| 1987–1993 | Dnepr Mogilev | 217 | (7) |
| 1994–1995 | Shinnik Bobruisk | 34 | (3) |
| 1995–1997 | MPKC Mozyr | 48 | (11) |
| 1997–1999 | Torpedo-MAZ Minsk | 70 | (4) |

Managerial career
- 2001–2002: Lokomotiv Minsk (youth)
- 2002–2004: Lokomotiv Minsk (assistant)
- 2004: Lokomotiv Minsk
- 2005: Kommunalnik Slonim
- 2006: Gomel (reserves)
- 2006–2007: Gomel
- 2007: Lokomotiv Minsk (assistant)
- 2007–2009: Dinamo Minsk (reserves)
- 2009–2010: Dinamo Minsk (assistant)
- 2010: Dinamo Minsk
- 2011: SKVICH Minsk
- 2012: Neman Grosno (assistant)
- 2013: SKVICH Minsk
- 2013–2014: Naftan Novopolotsk (assistant)
- 2014–2015: Gomel
- 2017: Belshina Bobruisk
- 2017–2018: UAS Zhitkovichi
- 2019: Naftan Novopolotsk (assistant)
- 2019–: Shakhtyor Soligorsk (U19)
- * Club domestic league appearances and goals

Vladimir Golmak (Belarusian: Уладзімір Гольмак; Russian: Владимир Гольмак; born 11 October 1966) is a Belarusian football coach and former player. He is currently the head coach of Shakhtyor Soligorsk's U19 team.

== Coaching career ==
In 2017 he was a head coach at Belshina Bobruisk.

== Honours ==
MPKC Mozyr

- Belarusian Premier League: 1996
- Belarusian Cup: 1995–96
