= Vladimir Putrash =

Belarusian footballer

Personal information
- Full name: Vladimir Stepanovich Putrash
- Date of birth: 4 April 1970 (age 56)
- Place of birth: Dobrush, Gomel Oblast, Belarusian SSR
- Height: 1.91 m (6 ft 3 in)
- Position: Forward

Youth career
- 1988-1990: SKAF Minsk
- 1990: Dinamo Minsk

Senior career*
Years	Team	Apps	(Gls)
1991	SKIF-ShVSM Minsk		
1992	Neman Stolbtsy	14	(0)
1993–1997	Belshina Bobruisk	118	(48)
1998–1999	Opava	10	(0)
1998	→ SK Jiskra Rýmařov (loan)	5	(4)
1999	Belshina Bobruisk	10	(8)
2000	Metallurg Krasnoyarsk	12	(2)
2000	AES Yelimay Semipalatinsk	6	(0)
2001	Trudovye Rezervy-RIPO Minsk	33	(14)
2002	MTZ-RIPO Minsk	23	(15)
2003–2004	Baranovichi	53	(23)
2005	Livadiya Dzerzhinsk	18	(5)

International career
1996	Belarus	2	(0)
- * Club domestic league appearances and goals

Vladimir Putrash (Belarusian: Уладзімір Путраш; Russian: Владимир Путраш; born 4 April 1970) is a Belarusian former footballer.

== Career ==
Putrash started his senior career with Neman Stolbtsy. In 1993, he signed for Belshina Bobruisk in the Belarusian Premier League, where he made one-hundred and eighteen league appearances and scored forty-eight goals. After that, he played for SFC Opava, SK Jiskra Rýmařov, Metallurg Krasnoyarsk, AES Yelimay Semipalatinsk, Trudovye Rezervy-RIPO Minsk, MTZ-RIPO Minsk, Baranovichi, and Livadiya-Yuni Dzerzhinsk.

== Honours ==
Belshina Bobruisk

- Belarusian Cup winner: 1996–97
