= Ilya Boltrushevich =

Belarusian footballer

Personal information
- Full name: Ilya Eduardovich Boltrushevich
- Date of birth: 30 March 1999 (age 27)
- Place of birth: Mogilev, Belarus
- Height: 1.93 m (6 ft 4 in)
- Position: Defender

Youth career
- 2015–2017: Dnepr Mogilev

Senior career*
| Years | Team | Apps | (Gls) |
| 2015–2018 | Dnepr Mogilev | 9 | (0) |
| 2017 | → Shakhtyor Soligorsk (loan) | 0 | (0) |
| 2019 | Dnyapro Mogilev | 0 | (0) |
| 2019 | → Lida (loan) | 26 | (3) |
| 2020 | Belshina Bobruisk | 0 | (0) |
| 2020 | Smorgon | 13 | (0) |
| 2021–2025 | Dnepr Mogilev | 70 | (5) |
| 2022 | → Isloch Minsk Raion (loan) | 8 | (0) |
- * Club domestic league appearances and goals as of 9 March 2026

Ilya Boltrushevich (Belarusian: Ілья Балтрушэвіч; Russian: Илья Болтрушевич; born 30 March 1999) is a Belarusian footballer.

He is a son of former Belarusian international player Eduard Boltrushevich.
