= Volodymyr Konovalov =

Ukrainian footballer

Personal information
- Full name: Volodymyr Viktorovych Konovalov
- Date of birth: 5 January 1973 (age 53)
- Height: 1.75 m (5 ft 9 in)
- Position: Forward

Youth career
- 1990: Shakhter Donetsk

Senior career*
Years	Team	Apps	(Gls)
1991	Baltika Kaliningrad	34	(14)
1992	Vedrich Rechitsa	29	(7)
1993	Spartak Vladikavkaz	7	(1)
1993–1994	MPKC Mozyr	25	(9)
1995	Azovets Mariupol	21	(3)
1995	Bobruisk	5	(2)
1995–1997	MPKC Mozyr	38	(7)
1998–1999	Torpedo-MAZ Minsk	29	(1)
1999	Reformatsiya Abakan	14	(3)
2000	Torpedo-Kadino Mogilev	15	(1)
2001	Naftan Novopolotsk	2	(0)
2001	Vedrich-97 Rechitsa	12	(1)
- * Club domestic league appearances and goals

Volodymyr Viktorovych Konovalov (Ukrainian: Володи́мир Ві́кторович Коновалов; born January 5, 1973) is a former Ukrainian football player.*
