= Vitaliy Pavlov =

Vitaliy Pavlov may refer to:

- Vitaliy Pavlov (footballer, born 1965), Soviet and Ukrainian football manager and player
- Vitaliy Pavlov (footballer, born 1988), Ukrainian football midfielder
