= 1996–97 Belarusian Cup =

Tournament details
- Country: Belarus
- Teams: 32

Final positions
- Champions: Belshina Bobruisk (1st title)
- Runners-up: Dinamo-93 Minsk

Tournament statistics
- Matches played: 30
- Goals scored: 98 (3.27 per match)
- Top goal scorer(s): Andrey Khlebasolaw (5 goals)

The 1996–97 Belarusian Cup was the sixth season of the annual Belarusian football cup competition. Contrary to the league season, it has been conducted in a fall-spring rhythm. It began on 20 July 1996 with the first of five rounds and ended on 25 May 1997 with the final at the Dinamo Stadium in Minsk.

FC MPKC Mozyr were the defending champions, having defeated FC Dinamo Minsk in the 1996 final, but were knocked out in the second round by one of the eventual finalists FC Dinamo-93 Minsk, the eventual runners-up.

FC Belshina Bobruisk won the final against FC Dinamo-93 Minsk to win their first title.

== Round of 32 ==
The games were played on 20, 23 and 24 July 1996.

Team 1	Score	Team 2
Kristall Smolevichi (III)	0–3	Dinamo-93 Minsk
Stroitel Starye Dorogi (II)	0–4	Dinamo Minsk
Kommunalnik Slonim (II)	1–3	Dnepr Mogilev
Lokomotiv Vitebsk (II)	2–4	Lokomotiv-96 Vitebsk
Kobrin (II)	4–2	Obuvshchik Lida
Gomel (II)	1–2	Torpedo Minsk
Stroitel Bereza (II)	0–5	Molodechno
Transmash Mogilev (II)	0–1	Torpedo Mogilev
Torpedo Zhodino (II)	1–2	Vedrich Rechitsa
Khimik Svetlogorsk (II)	0–2	MPKC Mozyr
Veras Vysoka Lipa (III)	0–1	Neman Grodno
BATE Borisov (III)	0–2	Dinamo Brest
Maksim-Legmash Orsha (II)	1–1 (a.e.t.) (8–9 p)	Belshina Bobruisk
Kommunalnik Pinsk (II)	0–2 (a.e.t.)	Ataka-Aura Minsk
Kardan-Flyers Grodno (II)	1–1 (a.e.t.) (3–2 p)	Shakhtyor Soligorsk
Dinamo-Juni Minsk (II)	1–1 (a.e.t.) (4–2 p)	Naftan-Devon Novopolotsk

== Round of 32 ==
The games were played between 1 and 4 August 1996.

Team 1	Score	Team 2
Molodechno	0–2 (a.e.t.)	Dinamo Minsk
MPKC Mozyr	1–2 (a.e.t.)	Dinamo-93 Minsk
Ataka-Aura Minsk	3–2 (a.e.t.)	Neman Grodno
Dinamo Brest	2–0	Dinamo-Juni Minsk (II)
Vedrich Rechitsa	2–3	Kobrin (II)
Dnepr Mogilev	3–1	Kardan-Flyers Grodno (II)
Belshina Bobruisk	3–2 (a.e.t.)	Torpedo Minsk
Lokomotiv-96 Vitebsk	6–1	Torpedo Mogilev

== Quarterfinals ==
The games were played on 7 and 8 May 1997.

Team 1	Score	Team 2
Kobrin (II)	w/o	Dnepr Mogilev
Dinamo-93 Minsk	3–0	Lokomotiv-96 Vitebsk
Ataka Minsk	1–2	Belshina Bobruisk
Dinamo Minsk	1–0	Dinamo Brest

== Semifinals ==
The games were played on 16 May 1997.

Team 1	Score	Team 2
Belshina Bobruisk	2–0 (a.e.t.)	Dnepr Mogilev
Dinamo Minsk	2–4 (a.e.t.)	Dinamo-93 Minsk

== Final ==
The final match was played on 25 May 1997 at the Dinamo Stadium in Minsk.

25 May 1997
17:00 UTC+3

Belshina Bobruisk	2–0	Dinamo-93 Minsk
Smirnykh 86'; Balashow 90'	Report

Dinamo Stadium, Minsk
Attendance: 7,000
Referee: Sergey Shmolik (Brest)
