= Andrey Skorobogatko =

Belarusian footballer (born 1968)

Andrey Skorabahatska
Personal information
- Full name: Andrey Viktaravich Skorabahatska
- Date of birth: 19 July 1968 (age 58)
- Place of birth: Zaporizhya, Ukrainian SSR
- Height: 1.74 m (5 ft 9 in)
- Position: Forward

Team information
- Current team: Neman Grodno (assistant coach)

Youth career
- Metalurh Zaporizhya

Senior career*
Years	Team	Apps	(Gls)
1986–1995	Dnepr Mogilev	297	(76)
1996–1997	MPKC Mozyr	26	(8)
1997	Transmash Mogilev	11	(2)
1998–1999	Torpedo-Kadino Mogilev	34	(7)
1999	Gomel	6	(0)
2000	Torpedo-Kadino Mogilev	24	(1)
Total		387	(94)

Managerial career
- 2004–2006: Torpedo-Kadino Mogilev
- 2006–2007: Kommunalnik Slonim
- 2008: Dnepr Mogilev (assistant)
- 2008–2011: Dnepr Mogilev
- 2013: Minsk (assistant)
- 2013–2014: Minsk
- 2014–2016: Belarus U21 (assistant)
- 2016–2017: Minsk (assistant)
- 2018: Belshina Bobruisk (assistant)
- 2019–2020: Belarus U17
- 2020–2021: Belarus U19
- 2022–: Neman Grodno (assistant)
- * Club domestic league appearances and goals

Andrey Viktaravich Skorabahatska (Belarusian: Андрэй Віктаравіч Скорабагацька; Russian: Андрей Викторович Скоробогатько; born 19 July 1968) is a Belarusian professional football coach and a former player.

He has formerly played for Belarusian Club Dnepr Mogilev, MPKC Mozyr, Transmash Mogilev, Torpedo-Kadino Mogilev and FC Gomel.

== Coaching career ==
Skorabahatska started coaching in 2004, in his country. On 8 August 2008, he was appointed the manager of Belarusian Premier League team Dnepr Mogilev, where he worked until 2011.

In the 2013–14 season he was head coach for Minsk.

In January 2018, Skorabahatska joined the technical staff of Georgi Kondratiev at Belshina Bobruisk. On 8 February 2019, he was appointed as manager of Belarus U17 national team.

== Honours ==
MPKC Mozyr

- Belarusian Premier League: 1996
- Belarusian Cup: 1995–96

Individual

- Belarusian Premier League top scorer: 1992
