= Vladimir Kurnev =

Belarusian footballer

Personal information
- Full name: Vladimir Borisovich Kurnev
- Date of birth: 12 September 1950 (age 76)
- Place of birth: Riga, Latvian SSR
- Position: Midfielder

Team information
- Current team: FC Minsk (youth coordinator)

Senior career*
Years	Team	Apps	(Gls)
1968–1977	Dinamo Minsk		
1977–1978	Pakhtakor Tashkent		
1979–1980	Dinamo Minsk		
1981	Lokomotiv Moscow		

Managerial career
- 1982–1992: Sputnik Minsk
- 1992: Niva Samokhvalovichi
- 1992–1993: Fandok Bobruisk
- 1993–1994: Santanas Samokhvalovichi
- 1996: Tiligul Tiraspol (assistant)
- 1996–1997: Torpedo-Kadino Mogilev (assistant)
- 1998: Dinamo Minsk
- 1998–1999: Zhemchuzhina Sochi (assistant)
- 1999–2000: Kristall Smolensk
- 2000–2003: Darida Minsk Raion
- 2003: Slavia Mozyr
- 2004: Dinamo Brest
- 2005–2006: Neman Grodno
- 2007: Kaunas
- 2007: Darida Minsk Raion
- 2010: Veras Nesvizh
- 2011: Partizan Minsk
- 2012: Dinamo Brest (assistant)
- 2012–2013: Dinamo Brest
- 2017–: Minsk (youth coordinator)
- * Club domestic league appearances and goals

Vladimir Borisovich Kurnev (Russian: Владимир Борисович Курнев; born 12 September 1950) is a Belarusian professional football coach and a former player. He works as youth coordinator with FC Minsk.

As a player, he spent the majority of his career in Dinamo Minsk, also spending a few seasons in Pakhtakor Tashkent and Lokomotiv Moscow.
