= Vladimir Sorochinskiy =

Belarusian footballer (born 1980)

Personal information
- Full name: Vladimir Vladimirovich Sorochinskiy
- Date of birth: 15 February 1980 (age 46)
- Place of birth: Jambyl, Kazakh SSR
- Height: 1.83 m (6 ft 0 in)
- Position: Defender

Team information
- Current team: Gorodeya (assistant coach)

Youth career
- 1996–1997: Taraz

Senior career*
Years	Team	Apps	(Gls)
1997	Taraz	7	(0)
1998–2000	Dinamo Brest	62	(6)
2000–2002	Slavia Mozyr	20	(1)
2004–2005	Dinamo Brest	47	(0)
2006–2007	Baranovichi	8	(1)
2008–2014	Gorodeya	153	(13)

Managerial career
- 2014–: Gorodeya (assistant)
- * Club domestic league appearances and goals as of 1 January 2014

Vladimir Sorochinskiy (Russian: Владимир Сорочинский; born 15 February 1980) is a Belarusian retired professional footballer.

== Career ==
Born in Jambyl, Kazakh SSR, Sorochinskiy began playing football with hometown FC Taraz. In 1998, he signed with FC Dinamo Brest where he would make 62 Belarusian Premier League appearances before moving to Slavia Mozyr during the 2000 season.

Sorochinskiy would play for Slavia until he suffered a serious injury during the 2002 season. He returned to Dinamo Brest in 2004, playing for the club in the Premier League until 2005. Sorochinskiy has spent the remainder of his career in the lower divisions of Belarusian football, with FC Baranovichi and FC Gorodeya.

== Honours ==
Slavia Mozyr

- Belarusian Premier League champion: 2000
