= Aleksandr Khrapkovsky =

Belarusian footballer

Personal information
- Full name: Aleksandr Valeryevich Khrapkovsky
- Date of birth: 12 March 1975 (age 51)
- Place of birth: Minsk, Belarusian SSR
- Height: 1.85 m (6 ft 1 in)
- Position: Defender

Team information
- Current team: Naftan Novopolotsk (manager)

Senior career*
Years	Team	Apps	(Gls)
1992–1995	Stroitel Starye Dorogi	23	(2)
1995–1996	Dinamo-Juni Minsk	31	(3)
1997–2002	Dinamo Minsk	125	(15)
2002–2004	Sokol Saratov	65	(2)
2004	Shakhtyor Soligorsk	15	(0)
2005–2006	Ural Yekaterinburg	35	(0)
2006	Salyut-Energiya Belgorod	21	(1)
2007	Shakhtyor Soligorsk	9	(0)
2007–2009	Smorgon	56	(0)

International career
1996–1997	Belarus U21	10	(1)
2002–2004	Belarus	11	(0)

Managerial career
- 2010–2012: Belarus U21 (assistant)
- 2012–2016: Belarus (analyst)
- 2021–2023: Dinamo Brest (assistant)
- 2022: Dinamo Brest (caretaker)
- 2023–2025: Molodechno
- 2026: Volna Pinsk (assistant)
- 2026–: Naftan Novopolotsk
- * Club domestic league appearances and goals

Aleksandr Valeryevich Khrapkovsky (Belarusian: Аляксандр Валер'евіч Храпкоўскі; Russian: Александр Валерьевич Храпковский; born 12 March 1975) is a Belarusian professional football coach and former player.

He represented Belarus in international competition, playing for the national team between 2002 and 2004 and appearing in UEFA Euro 2004 qualification.

== Career ==
As a youth player, Khrapkovsky played for Dynamo SDYUSHOR-3.

After leaving Dinamo Minsk, Khrapkovsky played for Sokol Saratov.

== Honours ==
Dinamo Minsk

- Belarusian Premier League champion: 1997
