= Eduard Baltrushevich =

Belarusian footballer

Personal information
- Full name: Eduard Eduardavich Baltrushevich
- Date of birth: 18 January 1971 (age 55)
- Place of birth: Vladimiro-Alexandrovskoye, Primorsky Krai, Russian SFSR
- Height: 1.85 m (6 ft 1 in)
- Position: Defender

Youth career
- 1990–1991: KIM Vitebsk

Senior career*
Years	Team	Apps	(Gls)
1991–1996	Lokomotiv-96 Vitebsk	105	(5)
1991	→ KIM-d Vitebsk	25	(1)
1995	→ Dvina-Belkon Novopolotsk (loan)	1	(0)
1996–1999	Dnepr Mogilev	90	(9)
1999	Petro Płock	4	(0)
2000	Belshina Bobruisk	26	(8)
2001	Fakel Voronezh	11	(2)
2001	→ Kristall Smolensk (loan)	10	(0)
2002	Belshina Bobruisk	20	(2)
2003	Neman Grodno	22	(3)
2004	Belshina Bobruisk	10	(0)
2004–2005	Torpedo-Kadino Mogilev	39	(5)
2006–2009	Spartak Shklov	112	(18)

International career
1996–2000	Belarus	3	(0)

Managerial career
- 2006–2009: Spartak Shklov (player-manager)
- * Club domestic league appearances and goals

Eduard Eduardavich Baltrushevich (Belarusian: Эдуард Эдуардавіч Балтрушэвiч; Russian: Эдуард Эдуардович Болтрушевич; born 18 January 1971) is a Belarusian former professional footballer who played as a defender.

His son Ilya Boltrushevich is also a professional footballer.

== Club career ==
Eduard Baltrushevich played for several clubs in Europe, including FC Fakel Voronezh in the Russian Premier League and Petro Płock in the Polish Ekstraklasa.

== International career ==
Baltrushevich made three appearances for the Belarus national football team. He made his international debut on 20 August 1996 in Fürth (Germany), playing the full 90 minutes in a friendly match against United Arab Emirates.

== Honours ==
Dnepr-Transmash Mogilev

- Belarusian Premier League: 1998
