= Igor Rakovskiy =

Russian footballer

Personal information
- Full name: Igor Ivanovich Rakovskiy
- Date of birth: 10 September 1975 (age 51)
- Height: 1.80 m (5 ft 11 in)
- Position: Midfielder

Senior career*
Years	Team	Apps	(Gls)
1997–1998	Salyut Buturlinovka	14	(10)
2000	Vedrich-97 Rechitsa	23	(4)
2001–2003	Slavia Mozyr	49	(9)
2003–2005	Chkalovets-1936 Novosibirsk	69	(6)
2007–2008	Dynamo Voronezh	46	(1)
2013–2015	Vybor-Kurbatovo Voronezh	10	(0)
- * Club domestic league appearances and goals

Igor Ivanovich Rakovskiy (Russian: Игорь Иванович Раковский; born 10 September 1975) is a former Russian football player.

== Club career ==
He made his professional debut in the Russian Second Division for FC Chkalovets-1936 Novosibirsk on 3 July 2003 in a game against FC Selenga Ulan-Ude.
