= Vladimir Gevorkyan =

Belarusian football coach (born 1955)

Personal information
- Date of birth: 14 December 1955 (age 70)
- Place of birth: Brest, Belarusian SSR
- Position: Midfielder

Senior career*
| Years | Team | Apps | (Gls) |
| 1976–1981 | Pedinstitut Brest | | |
| 1981–1988 | Torpedo Zhodino | | |

Managerial career
- 1988–1989: Dinamo Brest (youth)
- 1989–1990: Pedinstitut Brest
- 1991–1994: Dinamo Brest (assistant)
- 1994–1997: Dinamo Brest
- 2000: Vodokanal Brest
- 2001–2002: Dinamo Brest (assistant)
- 2003: Belshina Bobruisk
- 2003: Belshina Bobruisk (assistant)
- 2003–2004: Belshina Bobruisk
- 2005–2006: TOP 54 Biała Podlaska
- 2006–2008: Dinamo Brest
- 2010: Partizan Minsk
- 2010–2011: Podlasie Biała Podlaska
- 2013: Podlasie Biała Podlaska (assistant)
- 2015: Dnepr Mogilev
- * Club domestic league appearances and goals

Vladimir Gevorkyan (Belarusian: Уладзімір Геваркян, Russian: Владимир Геворкян, Armenian: Վլադիմիր Գեւորգյան; born 14 December 1955) is a Belarusian professional football coach and a former player. In 2015, he worked as a head coach of Dnepr Mogilev.

== Honours ==
=== As coach ===
Dinamo Brest

- Belarusian Cup: 2006–07
