= Oleg Volokh =

Belarusian footballer and manager

Personal information
- Full name: Oleg Antonovich Volokh
- Date of birth: 1 August 1937 (age 89)
- Place of birth: Seymchan, Magadan Oblast, Russian SFSR
- Height: 1.78 m (5 ft 10 in)
- Position: Forward

Senior career*
Years	Team	Apps	(Gls)
1960	Spartak Stanislav	12	(1)
1961	FC Neftyanik Drogobych	1	(0)
1961–1962	FC Selmash Lvov		
1963	FC ADK Alma-Ata	18	(4)
1964–1965	Vostok		(28)
1966–1968	Kairat	94	(14)
1969–1971	Dinamo Minsk	40	(2)
1971–1973	Spartak Semipalatinsk		(11)
1974–1976	Torpedo Zhodino		

Managerial career
- 1973–1976: Torpedo Zhodino
- 1977–1978: Dnepr Mogilev
- 1978: Spartak Semipalatinsk (assistant)
- 1979–1981: Spartak Semipalatinsk
- 1982–1983: Spartak Semipalatinsk (assistant)
- 1984–1987: Spartak Semipalatinsk
- 1990: Luch Minsk (assistant)
- 1991–1995: Shinnik Bobruisk
- 1996–1997: Belshina Bobruisk (assistant)
- 1997: Belshina Bobruisk
- 1997–1998: Belshina Bobruisk (assistant)
- 1998: Belshina Bobruisk (caretaker)
- 1998–1999: Belshina Bobruisk (assistant)
- 1999–2000: Belshina Bobruisk
- 2000: Yelimay
- 2001–2003: Bobruichanka Bobruisk
- 2003–2007: Belarus (women)
- 2004: Belshina Bobruisk (caretaker)
- 2005–2006: Belshina Bobruisk
- 2006–2007: Belshina Bobruisk (assistant)
- 2007: Belshina Bobruisk (caretaker)
- 2010–2015: Belshina Bobruisk (reserves/assistant)
- * Club domestic league appearances and goals

Oleg Antonovich Volokh (Russian: Олег Волох; born 8 April 1942) is a Belarusian former football manager and footballer.

== Early life ==
Volokh was born in 1942 in Kolyma, Russia. He was born to a Belarusian father.

== Style of play ==
Volokh mainly operated as a striker and was known for his speed.

== Managerial career ==
Volokh has been regarded as an important football figure in Bobruisk, Belarus.

== Personal life ==
Volokh has been married.
