= Oleg Sidorenkov =

Russian footballer

Personal information
- Full name: Oleg Anatolyevich Sidorenkov
- Date of birth: 13 June 1976 (age 50)
- Place of birth: Smolensk, Soviet Union
- Height: 1.86 m (6 ft 1 in)
- Position: Defender

Youth career
- 1993–1995: SKIF Smolensk

Senior career*
Years	Team	Apps	(Gls)
1996	Avangard Elektrostal		
1996–2000	Naftan Novopolotsk	54	(1)
2000	Ozertsy Glubokoye	6	(0)
2004	Orsha	11	(0)
2004–2006	Dynamo Vologda	77	(4)
2007	Sheksna Cherepovets	28	(0)
2008	Lokomotiv Liski	30	(1)
2009–2010	Dnepr Smolensk	61	(2)
2012	Miory	16	(3)

Managerial career
- 2012–2016: Naftan Novopolotsk (coach)
- 2016–2017: Naftan Novopolotsk
- 2018: Granit Mikashevichi (assistant)
- 2018: Granit Mikashevichi
- 2019–2020: Sakhalin Yuzhno-Sakhalinsk (assistant)
- 2020–2021: Sakhalin Yuzhno-Sakhalinsk
- * Club domestic league appearances and goals

Oleg Anatolyevich Sidorenkov (Russian: Олег Анатольевич Сидоренков; born 13 June 1976) is a Russian professional football coach and former player.

== Coaching career ==
On 16 February 2019, Sidorenkov joined FC Sakhalin Yuzhno-Sakhalinsk as a youth coach.
