= Sergey Petrovich Kovalchuk =

Belarusian footballer and coach

Sergey Kovalchuk
Personal information
- Full name: Sergey Petrovich Kovalchuk
- Date of birth: 16 December 1973 (age 52)
- Place of birth: Brest, Belarusian SSR
- Position: Midfielder

Senior career*
Years	Team	Apps	(Gls)
1990–1991	Impuls Brest		
1992–1995	Brestbytkhim Brest		
1996	Kobrin	19	(2)
1996–2004	Dinamo Brest	176	(15)

Managerial career
- 2005–2007: Dinamo Brest (reserves)
- 2008–2009: Dinamo Brest (assistant)
- 2009: Dinamo Brest (caretaker)
- 2009–2011: Dinamo Brest (assistant)
- 2011–2012: Dinamo Brest
- 2012–2013: Dinamo Brest (reserves)
- 2013–2016: Dinamo Brest
- 2016–2019: Dinamo Brest (sporting director)
- 2018: Dinamo Brest (caretaker)
- 2020–2022: Dinamo Brest
- 2024: Dinamo Brest
- * Club domestic league appearances and goals

Sergey Petrovich Kovalchuk (Belarusian: Сяргей Пятровіч Кавальчук; born 16 December 1973) is a Belarusian professional football coach and a former player. Since 2005, he has worked for Dinamo Brest in various coaching positions.
