= Vitaliy Pavlov (footballer, born 1965) =

Ukrainian football player and manager (born 1965)

Personal information
- Full name: Vitaliy Gennadyevich Pavlov
- Date of birth: 21 August 1965 (age 61)
- Place of birth: Ovruch, Ukrainian SSR
- Height: 1.80 m (5 ft 11 in)
- Position: Midfielder

Team information
- Current team: Belarus U21 (manager)

Senior career*
Years	Team	Apps	(Gls)
1982–1983	Spartak Zhytomyr		
1984–1986	Zirka Berdychiv		
1989	Sokhibkor Khalkabad	22	(0)
1991	Kuban Barannikovsky	36	(6)
1992–1993	Fandok Bobruisk	31	(5)
1994	Arda Kardzhali		
1994–1995	Dnepr Rogachev	11	(3)
1995	Vedrich Rechitsa	3	(0)
1996–1998	Svisloch-Krovlya Osipovichi	56	(12)
1998	Atlantis		
1999–2000	Svisloch-Krovlya Osipovichi	37	(0)

Managerial career
- 2002–2003: Dnepr Rogachev
- 2004–2005: Vedrich-97 Rechitsa
- 2005–2009: MTZ-RIPO Minsk (assistant)
- 2009: Slavia Mozyr
- 2010–2016: Belshina Bobruisk (assistant)
- 2012: Belshina Bobruisk (caretaker)
- 2016: Belshina Bobruisk
- 2017–2020: Slutsk
- 2021: Belshina Bobruisk
- 2022–2023: Belshina Bobruisk (assistant)
- 2023: Belshina Bobruisk
- 2024: Belarus U19
- 2025–: Belarus U21
- * Club domestic league appearances and goals

Vitaliy Pavlov (Ukrainian: Віталій Павлов; Belarusian: Віталь Паўлаў; born 21 August 1965) is a Soviet and Ukrainian football manager and former player.

== Career ==
Pavlov spent a big part of his career in Belarus and currently holds Belarusian citizenship. Since 2010, he has been working as Belshina Bobruisk assistant coach. In 2012, he briefly acted as a caretaker manager. In January 2016, he was appointed as team's permanent head coach, although just 8 days later he was replaced by new coach Vladimir Yezhurov due to change in Belshina management. He was once again appointed as team's head coach in July 2016.
