= Vyacheslav Akshayev =

Belarusian footballer

Personal information
- Full name: Vyacheslav Yevgenyevich Akshayev
- Date of birth: 6 April 1959 (age 67)
- Place of birth: Vitebsk, Byelorussian SSR, Soviet Union
- Height: 1.83 m (6 ft 0 in)
- Position: Midfielder

Youth career
- SDYuShOR-6 Vitebsk

Senior career*
| Years | Team | Apps | (Gls) |
| 1977–1988 | KIM Vitebsk | 223 | (14) |
| 1989 | SKB Vitebsk | | |

Managerial career
- 1993–1995: Dvina Vitebsk (assistant)
- 1995–1998: Lokomotiv-96 Vitebsk
- 1999–2000: Gomel
- 2000–2002: Belshina Bobruisk
- 2002: Torpedo Zhodino (sporting director)
- 2003: Molodechno-2000
- 2003–2004: MTZ-RIPO Minsk
- 2004: Torpedo Zhodino (sporting director)
- 2004–2007: Naftan Novopolotsk
- 2007: Gomel (assistant)
- 2008: Neman Grodno
- 2008: Lokomotiv Minsk
- 2009–2010: DSK Gomel
- 2011–2012: Belarus (assistant)
- 2012: Olimpia Elbląg (assistant)
- 2018: Orsha
- * Club domestic league appearances and goals

Vyacheslav Yevgenyevich Akshayev (Belarusian: Вячасла́ў Яўге́навіч Акша́еў; Russian: Вячесла́в Евге́ньевич Акша́ев; born 6 April 1959) is a Belarusian professional football coach and a former player.

== Career ==
Akshayev is one of the most successful Belarusian coaches of the 90s and 2000s. He has led Lokomotiv-96 Vitebsk to win Belarusian Cup in 1998. In 2001 he won another Cup with Belshina Bobruisk before leading them to Belarusian Premier League title in 2002.

Between 2011 and 2012 he worked as an assistant coach in Belarus national football team under Georgi Kondratiev.
