= Sergei Mikhailov (footballer, born 1963) =

Russian footballer

Sergei Pavlovich Mikhailov
Personal information
- Date of birth: 13 July 1963 (age 63)
- Place of birth: Moscow, Russian SFSR
- Height: 1.78 m (5 ft 10 in)
- Position: Defender

Senior career*
Years	Team	Apps	(Gls)
1981	CSKA Moscow	0	(0)
1982	Dynamo Bryansk	18	(1)
1983	CSKA Moscow	0	(0)
1983–1984	Dynamo Bryansk	44	(0)
1985–1990	Arsenal Tula	195	(10)
1990–1998	Motor Lublin	170	(4)
2005–2006	Motor Lublin		
2009–2010	Świdniczanka Świdnik Mały		
2012–2013	LKS Skrobów		
2016–2017	LZS Krężnica Jara		
2018	LZS Krężnica Jara		
2020–2022	LZS Krężnica Jara		
- * Club domestic league appearances and goals

Sergei Pavlovich Mikhailov (Russian: Серге́й Павлович Михайлов; born 13 July 1963) is a Russian former professional footballer who played as a defender.

== Club career ==
Mikhailov began his career with CSKA Moscow, but did not appear in any Soviet Top League matches for the club. He played in the Soviet Second League with Dynamo Bryansk and Arsenal Tula.
