= Vitaly Varivonchik =

Belarusian footballer and coach

Personal information
- Full name: Vitaly Aleksandrovich Varivonchik
- Date of birth: 9 March 1972 (age 54)
- Position: Goalkeeper

Senior career*
Years	Team	Apps	(Gls)
1992–1993	Stroitel Starye Dorogi	31	(0)
1993–1994	KIM Vitebsk	31	(0)
1994–1996	Dinamo Minsk	53	(0)
1997–1998	Dinamo-93 Minsk	18	(0)
1998–2000	Jaro	60	(1)
2001	Slavia Mozyr	14	(0)
2003	Belshina Bobruisk	23	(0)
2004	Shakhtyor Soligorsk	1	(0)
2004–2005	Inter Baku	10	(0)
2006–2007	Vitebsk	12	(0)
2008	Gorodeya	11	(0)

International career
1997–2000	Belarus	3	(0)

Managerial career
- 2008: Belarus U18 (assistant)
- 2009–2011: Sibir Novosibirsk (assistant)
- 2013–2014: Dinamo Minsk (assistant)
- 2015: Bereza-2010 (assistant)
- 2017–2018: Irtysh Pavlodar (GK coach)
- 2019–2021: Rotor Volgograd (GK coach)
- * Club domestic league appearances and goals

Vitaly Aleksandrovich Varivonchik (Russian: Виталий Александрович Варивончик; Belarusian: Віталь Варывончык; born 9 March 1972) is a Belarusian professional football coach and a former player.

== Honours ==
Dinamo Minsk

- Belarusian Premier League champion: 1994–95, 1995

Shakhtyor Soligorsk

- Belarusian Cup winner: 2003–04
