= Syarhey Lagutko =

Belarusian footballer

Personal information
- Full name: Syarhey Maryanavich Lagutko
- Date of birth: 23 May 1970 (age 56)
- Place of birth: Minsk, Belarusian SSR
- Height: 1.75 m (5 ft 9 in)
- Position: Midfielder

Senior career*
Years	Team	Apps	(Gls)
1992–1994	AFViS-RShVSM Minsk	12	(8)
1994–1995	Maxim-Legmash Orsha	8	(11)
1995	Saturn-1991 Saint Petersburg	30	(7)
1996	Krylia Sovetov Samara	10	(0)
1997	BATE Borisov	7	(1)
1998	Neman Grodno	11	(2)
2000	Darida Minsk Raion	10	(7)
2001	Neman-Belcard Grodno	11	(2)
2001	Rudensk	11	(12)
2002–2003	Veras Nesvizh	24	(13)
2007	Nalogovik Minsk		
- * Club domestic league appearances and goals

Syarhey Maryanavich Lagutko (Russian: Сергей Марьянович Лагутко; born 23 May 1970) is a former Belarusian football player.

He also played futsal professionally, winning many Belarus trophies and titles in that sport.
