= Aleh Charnyawski =

Belarusian footballer

Personal information
- Date of birth: 25 November 1970 (age 55)
- Place of birth: Izmail, Ukrainian SSR
- Position: Midfielder

Senior career*
Years	Team	Apps	(Gls)
1990	Stroitel Starye Dorogi		
1991–1998	Dinamo Minsk	139	(15)
1999–2000	Shakhtyor Soligorsk	38	(6)
2005	Molodechno-2000	8	(1)

International career
1996–1997	Belarus	7	(0)
- * Club domestic league appearances and goals

Aleh Dzmitryjevich Charnyawski (Belarusian: Алег Дзмітрыевіч Чарняўскі; Ukrainian: Олег Дмитрович Чернявський, romanized: Oleh Dmytrovych Cherniavskyi; born 25 November 1970) is a retired Belarusian professional footballer.

== Career ==
Charnyawski started his career with Stroitel Starye Dorogi.

== Honours ==
Dinamo Minsk

- Belarusian Premier League champion: 1992, 1993–94, 1994–95, 1995, 1997
- Belarusian Cup winner: 1992, 1993–94
