= Central Stadium (Rechitsa) =

Stadium in Rechirsa, Belarus

- Interactive map of Central Stadium
- Former names: Rechitsadrev Stadium
- Location: Rechitsa, Belarus
- Coordinates: 52°26′11″N 31°0′42″E
- Owner: City of Rechitsa
- Capacity: 3,550
- Surface: Grass
- Field size: 105 x 68 meters

Construction
- Opened: 1925
- Renovated: 1944, 1988, 2007

Tenant
- Rechitsa-2014

Central Stadium is a multi-purpose stadium in Rechitsa, Belarus. It is mostly used for football matches and is a home stadium for Rechitsa-2014. The stadium holds 3,550 spectators.

== History ==
The stadium was built and opened in 1925. After severe damages suffered during World War II, the stadium was rebuilt in 1944. Further renovations were performed at the stadium in 1988 and again 2007.

The stadium was originally attached to a local timber production plant was accordingly named Rechitsadrev Stadium. In 2001, the stadium became a city property and was renamed to Central Stadium.
