= Yevgeni Pchelintsev =

Russian footballer

Personal information
- Full name: Yevgeni Sergeyevich Pchelintsev
- Date of birth: 6 November 1976 (age 49)
- Height: 1.75 m (5 ft 9 in)
- Position: Midfielder

Senior career*
Years	Team	Apps	(Gls)
1995–1999	Fabus Bronnitsy	192	(27)
2000	Chernomorets Novorossiysk	2	(0)
2000	→ Chernomorets-d Novorossiysk	6	(3)
2000	Dinamo Minsk	15	(2)
2001	Kuban Krasnodar	7	(0)
2001	Reutov	9	(4)
2002	Rybinsk	22	(1)
2003	Severstal Cherepovets	15	(3)
- * Club domestic league appearances and goals

Yevgeni Sergeyevich Pchelintsev (Russian: Евгений Сергеевич Пчелинцев; born 6 November 1976) is a Russian former football player.

== Honours ==
Dinamo Minsk

- Belarusian Premier League bronze: 2000
