= 2001 Belarusian Premier League =

Belarusian Premier League
- Season: 2001
- Champions: Belshina
- Relegated: Naftan; Vedrich-97
- Champions League: Belshina
- UEFA Cup: Gomel; Dinamo Minsk
- Intertoto Cup: BATE
- Matches: 182
- Goals: 482 (2.65 per match)
- Top goalscorer: (Russia) Sergei Davydov (25)
- Biggest home win: Slavia 6–0 Lokomotiv-96
- Biggest away win: 0–4 – 3 games; 1–5 – 1 game
- Highest scoring: BATE 6–3 Molodechno-2000; Slavia 6–3 Vedrich-97

The 2001 Belarusian Premier League was the 11th season of top-tier football in Belarus. It started on April 11 and ended on November 7, 2001. Slavia Mozyr were the defending champions.

== Team changes from 2000 season ==
Due to league reduction from 16 to 14 teams, three worst placed teams in 2000 – Lida, Torpedo-Kadino Mogilev and Kommunalnik Slonim relegated to the First League, while only one team, winners of 2000 First League Molodechno, replaced them. Molodechno changed their name to Molodechno-2000 following the promotion. Naftan-Devon Novopolotsk shortened their name to Naftan Novopolotsk midway through 2001 season.

== Overview ==
Belshina Bobruisk won their 1st champions title and qualified for the next season's Champions League. The championship runners-up Dinamo Minsk and 2001-02 Cup winners Gomel qualified for UEFA Cup. Teams finished on the last two places, Naftan Novopolotsk and Vedrich-97 Rechitsa relegated to the First League.

== Teams and venues ==
Location of teams in 2001 Belarusian Premier League

Team	Location	Venue	Capacity	Position in 2000
Slavia	Mozyr	Yunost Stadium	5,250	1
BATE	Borisov	City Stadium (Borisov)	5,500	2
Dinamo Minsk	Minsk	Dinamo Stadium (Minsk)	40,000	3
Neman-Belcard	Grodno	Neman Stadium	14,000	4
Shakhtyor	Soligorsk	Stroitel Stadium	5,000	5
Gomel	Gomel	Luch Stadium	5,000	6
Dnepr-Transmash	Mogilev	Spartak Stadium (Mogilev)	7,700	7
Torpedo-MAZ	Minsk	Torpedo Stadium (Minsk)	5,200	8
Belshina	Bobruisk	Spartak Stadium (Bobruisk)	2,000	9
Dinamo Brest	Brest	OSK Brestsky	3,000	10
Lokomotiv-96	Vitebsk	Dinamo Stadium (Vitebsk)	5,250	11
Vedrich-97	Rechitsa	Central Stadium (Rechitsa)	5,500	12
Naftan	Novopolotsk	Atlant Stadium	6,500	13
Molodechno-2000	Molodechno	City Stadium (Molodechno)	5,650	First league, 1

1. Gomel spent the season at Luch Stadium, as their regular stadium Central Stadium was closed for renovation.
2. Lokomotiv-96 played five games at DYuSSh Stadium in Bolbasovo and three games at City Stadium in Orsha, before their own Dinamo Stadium was reopened after renovation.

== Table ==
Pos	Team	Pld	W	D	L	GF	GA	GD	Pts	Qualification or relegation
1	Belshina Bobruisk (C)	26	17	4	5	43	20	+23	55	Qualification for Champions League first qualifying round
2	Dinamo Minsk	26	16	5	5	52	21	+31	53	Qualification for UEFA Cup qualifying round
3	BATE Borisov	26	16	3	7	54	31	+23	51	Qualification for Intertoto Cup first round
4	Neman-Belcard Grodno	26	14	8	4	44	20	+24	50	
5	Shakhtyor Soligorsk	26	13	7	6	43	24	+19	46	
6	Gomel	26	13	5	8	36	24	+12	44	Qualification for UEFA Cup qualifying round (Note: Gomel qualified for the UEFA Cup qualifying round by winning the 2001–02 Belarusian Cup.)
7	Slavia Mozyr	26	13	5	8	49	27	+22	44	
8	Torpedo-MAZ Minsk	26	10	7	9	31	32	−1	37	
9	Dnepr-Transmash Mogilev	26	8	7	11	29	37	−8	31	
10	Molodechno-2000	26	8	5	13	23	47	−24	29	
11	Dinamo Brest	26	8	5	13	26	38	−12	29	
12	Lokomotiv-96 Vitebsk	26	4	7	15	18	51	−33	19	
13	Naftan Novopolotsk (R)	26	4	2	20	18	51	−33	14	Relegation to Belarusian First League
14	Vedrich-97 Rechitsa (R)	26	2	2	22	17	60	−43	8	Relegation to Belarusian First League

Source: rsssf.com
Rules for classification: 1st points; 2nd matches won; 3rd head-to-head
(C) Champions; (R) Relegated

== Results ==
Home \ Away	BAT	BSH	DBR	DMI	DNE	GOM	LVI	MOL	NAF	NEM	SHA	SLA	TMI	VED
BATE Borisov		0–1	2–1	1–3	2–0	1–0	2–0	6–3	4–1	1–1	0–0	3–2	5–2	3–0
Belshina Bobruisk	2–3		3–2	1–2	2–0	1–0	2–0	2–0	1–0	0–0	1–0	2–0	3–1	2–0
Dinamo Brest	1–0	0–2		2–1	0–0	0–3	3–1	0–0	3–0	0–3	2–1	1–0	1–3	0–0
Dinamo Minsk	2–0	0–1	1–1		0–1	3–0	4–0	3–1	1–0	2–0	2–0	0–1	3–1	4–1
Dnepr-Transmash Mogilev	2–3	0–3	2–0	4–3		0–0	1–1	4–2	1–1	0–2	2–2	1–2	3–1	0–2
Gomel	0–1	3–2	1–0	0–4	2–0		5–0	3–0	2–0	2–1	3–1	3–1	2–3	0–0
Lokomotiv-96 Vitebsk	0–3	1–1	0–0	1–3	1–1	0–1		1–1	4–0	1–1	1–2	0–4	1–0	2–0
Molodechno-2000	2–1	0–0	1–0	1–3	2–1	1–0	0–1		2–1	0–3	0–0	0–4	1–1	2–0
Naftan Novopolotsk	1–1	1–3	2–1	1–2	0–1	0–1	2–1	0–1		1–2	0–3	0–2	1–2	2–0
Neman-Belcard Grodno	4–2	2–2	3–1	1–1	0–1	0–0	1–0	3–0	5–0		1–0	1–1	1–0	2–0
Shakhtyor Soligorsk	1–0	4–2	4–1	2–2	1–0	3–1	0–0	4–1	3–0	4–1		1–1	1–1	1–0
Slavia Mozyr	1–3	1–0	2–3	0–0	4–2	0–0	6–0	4–0	3–0	0–1	2–0		1–1	6–3
Torpedo-MAZ Minsk	1–4	0–1	1–0	0–0	0–0	0–0	5–0	1–0	2–1	0–0	0–2	2–0		1–0
Vedrich-97 Rechitsa	0–3	0–3	2–3	0–3	1–2	2–4	3–1	1–2	0–3	1–5	0–3	0–1	1–2	

Source: football.by (in Belarusian)
Legend: Blue = home team win; Yellow = draw; Red = away team win.

== Belarusian clubs in European Cups ==
Round	Team #1	Agg.	Team #2	1st leg	2nd leg
2001 UEFA Intertoto Cup
First round	Dinamo Minsk (Belarus)	7–1	(Luxembourg) Hobscheid	6–0	1–1
Second round	Dinamo Minsk (Belarus)	3–0	(Israel) Hapoel Haifa	2–0	1–0
Third round	Wolfsburg (Germany)	4–3	(Belarus) Dinamo Minsk	4–3	0–0
2001–02 UEFA Cup
Qualifying round	Shakhtyor Soligorsk (Belarus)	2–5	(Bulgaria) CSKA Sofia	1–2	1–3
Qualifying round	Ružomberok (Slovakia)	3–1	(Belarus) Belshina Bobruisk	3–1	0–0
Qualifying round	Dinamo Tbilisi (Georgia (country))	2–5	(Belarus) BATE Borisov	2–1	0–4
First round	BATE Borisov (Belarus)	0–6	(Italy) Milan	0–2	0–4
2001–02 UEFA Champions League
First qualifying round	VB Vágur (Faroe Islands)	0–5	(Belarus) Slavia Mozyr	0–0	0–5
Second qualifying round	Slavia Mozyr (Belarus)	0–2	(Slovakia) Inter Bratislava	0–1	0–1

== Top scorers ==
Rank	Name	Team	Goals
1	(Russia) Sergei Davydov	Neman-Belcard Grodno	25
2	(Belarus) Vitali Kutuzov	BATE Borisov	14
3	(Belarus) Petr Katchouro	Dinamo Minsk	12
4	(Belarus) Viktor Borel	Gomel	11
4	(Belarus) Ihor Chumachenko	Dinamo Minsk, Dnepr-Transmash Mogilev	11
4	(Belarus) Syarhey Nikiforenka	Shakhtyor Soligorsk	11
4	(Belarus) Valery Strypeykis	Slavia Mozyr	11
8	(Belarus) Vadzim Boyka	Dinamo Brest	10
8	(Belarus) Artem Kontsevoy	BATE Borisov	10
8	(Belarus) Aleksandr Sednev	Belshina Bobruisk	10

== See also ==
- 2001 Belarusian First League
- 2000–01 Belarusian Cup
- 2001–02 Belarusian Cup
