= FC Dynamo Brest =

Belarusian professional football club

Dynamo Brest
- Full name: Football Club Dynamo Brest
- Founded: 1960; 66 years ago
- Ground: Regional Sport Complex Brestsky
- Capacity: 10,169
- Manager: Aleksandr Sednyov
- League: Belarusian Premier League
- 2025: Belarusian Premier League, 4th of 16
- Website: https://dynamo-brest.by/
Home colours	Away colours

FC Dynamo Brest (Belarusian: ФК Дынама Брэст, FK Dynama Brest; Russian: ФК Динамо Брест) is a Belarusian professional football club based in Brest. The club plays in the Belarusian Premier League, the top division in Belarusian football.

In 2019, Dynamo won its first Belarusian Premier League title. The club has also won the Belarusian Cup in 2007, 2017 and 2018.

== History ==
=== Origins ===
The club was founded in 1960 as Spartak Brest and joined the Soviet Class B (second-tier league) the same year. After the 1962 season, they were relegated as a result of league reorganization. They came close to promotion twice in 1964 and 1967 but lost the final round both times. They were finally promoted on their third attempt in 1969, but the following year they again dropped to the third tier due to league reorganization. In 1972, the team was renamed Bug Brest and finally, in 1976 Dуnamo Brest. From 1970 until the end of the Soviet era, the club was playing in the Soviet third-tier league. Dynamo Brest had a strong connection with Dinamo Minsk during these years (as both clubs were affiliated to Dinamo Sports Society) and often accepted young Minsk team players on loan.

=== Belarusian Premier League ===
In 1992, Dynamo Brest joined the Belarusian Premier League and has been playing there ever since. Their best result was a title in the 2019 season, with 5 points of difference to BATE Borisov. In 2007, Dynamo Brest won the Belarusian Cup, also securing their only UEFA Cup participation. During the 2012 season, they were using the name FC Brest due to legal issues with using the Dynamo brand name, the rights to which were claimed by Belarusian Dynamo Sport Society. This issue was resolved only by the end of the year. In the 2017 season, Dinamo Brest drew an average home league attendance of 5,689, the highest in the league.

=== Name changes ===
- 1960: founded as Spartak Brest
- 1972: renamed Bug Brest (after Bug River)
- 1976: renamed Dinamo Brest
- 2012: renamed FC Brest
- 2013: renamed Dinamo Brest (in 2017, Latin spelling altered to Dynamo, as seen on the updated logo)

== Supporters and rivalries ==
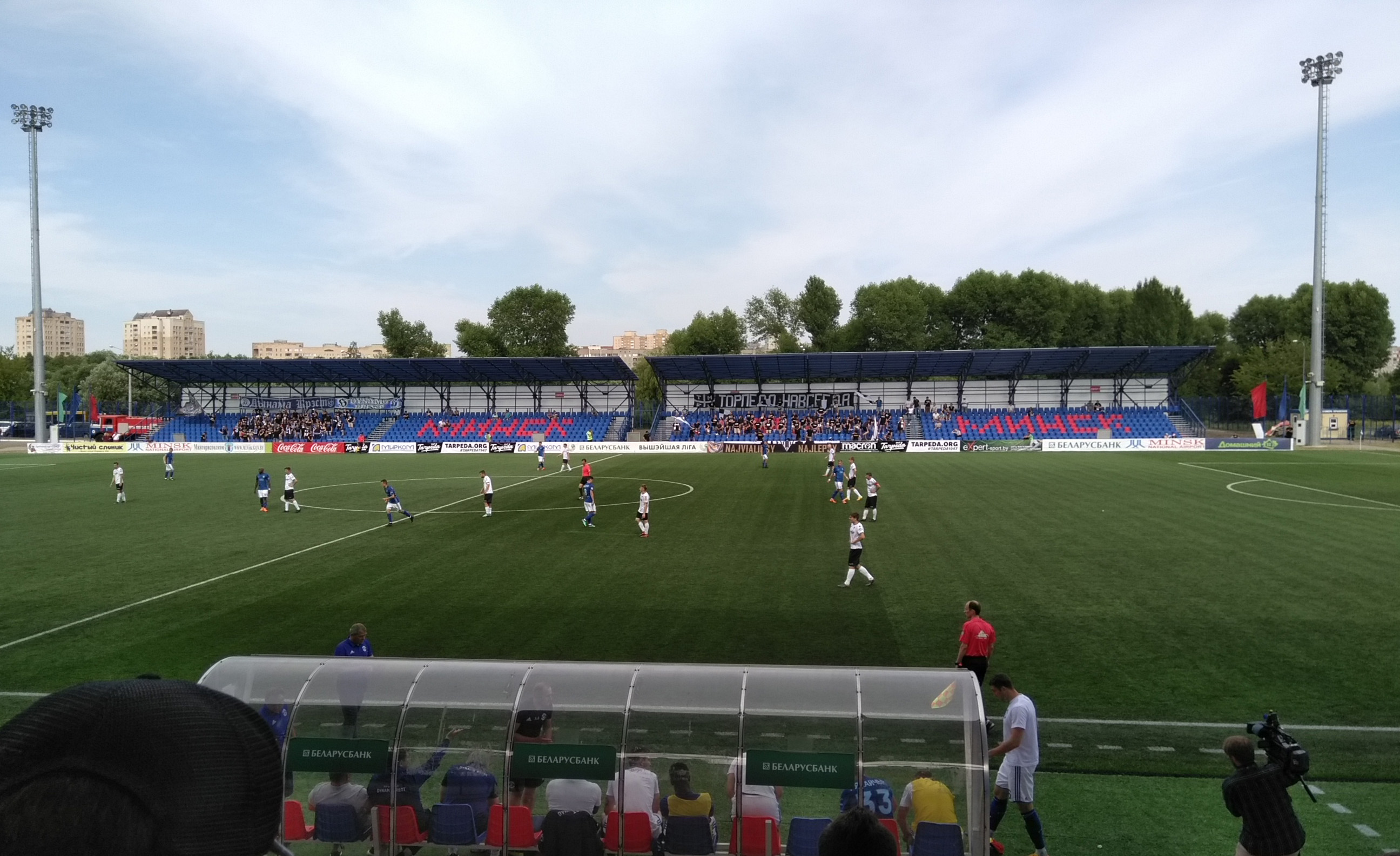
June 2018, Torpedo Minsk – Dynamo Brest

The first organised fan group was created on 1 August 1998, and the fan-dedicated stand can hold around 200–500 fans. An ultras group was created in 2008. The fans call themselves the Blue White Devils. They are politically right-wing.

The club has two fan clubs: in Pinsk and Kobrin. Fans of Orlęta Radzyń Podlaski,Dinamo Minsk, and BATE Borisov are in support of one another. They have a rivalry with clubs such as FC Gomel, Dnepr Mogilev, Shakhtyor Soligorsk, Slavia Mozyr, Belshina Bobruisk, Torpedo Minsk and Neman Grodno.

== Honours ==
- Belarusian Premier League
  - Winners (1): 2019
  - Third place (1): 1992
- Belarusian Cup
  - Winners (3): 2006–07, 2016–17, 2017–18
  - Runners-up (1): 2019–20
- Belarusian Super Cup
  - Winners (3): 2018, 2019, 2020

== Current squad ==
As of 25 August, 2026

Note: Flags indicate national team as defined under FIFA eligibility rules; some limited exceptions apply. Players may hold more than one non-FIFA nationality.

No.	Pos.	Nation	Player
1	GK	BLR	Maksim Belov
2	DF	BLR	Andrey Rylach
3	DF	RUS	Kirill Glushchenkov
4	MF	MNE	Žarko Popović
5	DF	BLR	Maksim Kovel
6	DF	BLR	Yegor Khralenkov
7	FW	MNE	Dušan Bakić
11	DF	BLR	Denis Levitsky
17	FW	BLR	Roman Gritskevich
18	DF	BLR	Nikita Stepanov
19	MF	BLR	Denis Grechikho
21	GK	BLR	Alyaksandr Nyachayew
22	DF	BLR	Aleksandr Pavlovets

No.	Pos.	Nation	Player
23	DF	BLR	Vladislav Lyakh
24	MF	RUS	Yegor Kortsov
25	FW	BLR	Vladislav Lozhkin
35	GK	BLR	Igor Malashchitskiy
36	DF	BRA	Guilherme Guedes
37	FW	BLR	Ilya Yurkevich
42	MF	BLR	Nikita Burak
44	MF	BLR	Aleksey Butarevich
55	DF	BLR	Aleksey Lavrik
77	DF	BLR	Roman Yuzepchuk
88	FW	BLR	Denis Kovalevich
99	MF	BLR	Ivan Zenkov

=== Out on loan ===
Note: Flags indicate national team as defined under FIFA eligibility rules; some limited exceptions apply. Players may hold more than one non-FIFA nationality.

No.	Pos.	Nation	Player
20	MF	BLR	Mikhail Bondarenko (at Baranovichi)
—	MF	BLR	Matvey Dukso (at Smorgon)
—	DF	BLR	Maksim Kasarab (at Dnepr Mogilev)

No.	Pos.	Nation	Player
—	DF	BLR	Ilya Sedro (at Volna Pinsk)
—	MF	BLR	Dmitriy Volkovets (at Molodechno)

== League and Cup history ==
=== Soviet Union ===
Season	Level	Pos	Pld	W	D	L	Goals	Points	Domestic Cup	Notes
1960	2nd	15	30	7	4	19	27–59	18		
1961	2nd	13	30	7	8	15	28–43	22	Round of 64	
1962	2nd	4	32	15	9	6	39–25	39	Round of 512	Relegated^{1}
1963	3rd	15	30	7	9	14	16–27	23	Round of 1024	
1964	3rd	4	30	12	12	6	25–12	36	Round of 2048	
1964	3rd	5	4	0	0	4	2–6	0	Round of 2048	Final round^{2}
1965	3rd	10	30	9	8	13	28–30	26	Round of 1024	
1966	3rd	11	32	8	11	13	26–34	27		
1967	3rd	4	34	14	12	8	33–28	40	Round of 4096	
1967	3rd	2	3	1	2	0	3–2	4	Round of 4096	Semi-final round^{3}
1968	3rd	3	38	21	8	9	48–27	50		
1968	3rd		2	1	1	0	2–0	3		Promotion/relegation play-off^{4}
1969	2nd	13	40	12	13	15	30–29	37	Round of 32	Relegated^{5}
1970	3rd	16	42	12	13	17	32–48	37	Round of 128	
1971	3rd	9	38	13	16	9	33–29	55		
1972	3rd	6	38	14	15	9	44–32	57		
1973	3rd	11	32	10	9	13	35–46	23^{6}		
1974	3rd	14	40	10	14	16	33–44	34		
1975	3rd	10	34	12	7	15	38–44	31		
1976	3rd	2	38	20	10	8	63–38	50		
1977	3rd	11	40	14	13	13	51–44	41	Round of 64	
1978	3rd	6	46	24	10	12	62–37	58		
1979	3rd	3	46	24	14	8	77–35	62		
1980	3rd	4	32	12	10	10	39–36	34		
1981	3rd	6	40	13	10	17	45–37	56		
1982	3rd	13	30	9	4	17	30–44	22		
1983	3rd	9	32	10	10	12	41–36	30		
1984	3rd	12	34	9	9	16	38–50	27		
1985	3rd	6	30	13	7	10	40–33	33		
1986	3rd	7	30	15	3	12	41–31	33		
1987	3rd	4	34	18	6	10	54–26	42		
1988	3rd	10	34	14	6	14	43–41	34		
1989	3rd	5	42	19	10	13	53–51	48	Round of 128	
1990	3rd	9	42	15	15	12	49–39	45		
1991	3rd	16	42	14	9	19	50–50	37		
1992									Round of 128	

- ^{1} Relegated as the 2nd level (Class B) was reduced from 10 zones (150 teams) in 1962 to a single group of 18 teams in 1963.
- ^{2} Advanced to the final round as the best-placed team from Belarusian SSR. No team won the promotion from this final group in the end.
- ^{3} Advanced to the semi-final round of promotion tournament (for one spot) as one of top 8 teams not from Russian, Ukrainian, Kazakh or Central Asian SSR.
- ^{4} As the best-placed team from Belarusian SSR, Spartak advanced to promotion/relegation play-off against the lowest-placed Belarusian team from the 2nd level.
- ^{5} Relegated as the 2nd level (Class B Second Group, renamed Class B First Group from next season) was reduced from 4 zones (87 teams) in 1969 to a single group of 22 teams in 1970.
- ^{6} In 1973, every draw was followed by a penalty shoot-out, with a winner gaining 1-point and loser gaining 0.

=== Belarus ===
Season	Level	Pos	Pld	W	D	L	Goals	Points	Domestic Cup	Notes
1992	1st	3	15	8	3	4	21–10	19	Semi-finals	
1992–93	1st	7	32	13	9	10	33–29	35	Round of 16	
1993–94	1st	8	30	11	9	10	30–29	31	Semi-finals	
1994–95	1st	10	30	9	10	11	33–33	28	Round of 16	
1995	1st	10	15	5	2	8	27–32	17	Round of 16	
1996	1st	10	30	7	11	12	39–43	32	Round of 16	
1997	1st	7	30	12	6	12	44–52	42	Quarter-finals	
1998	1st	9	28	12	2	14	40–40	38	Round of 16	
1999	1st	7	30	14	4	12	59–52	46	Round of 16	
2000	1st	10	30	10	4	16	37–51	34	Quarter-finals	
2001	1st	11	26	8	5	13	26–38	29	Round of 16	
2002	1st	10	26	8	8	10	25–26	32	Semi-finals	
2003	1st	11	30	5	12	13	21–49	27	Round of 16	
2004	1st	8	30	10	9	11	39–41	39	Round of 32	
2005	1st	8	26	11	3	12	39–33	36	Round of 16	
2006	1st	9	26	8	7	11	17–31	31	Quarter-finals	
2007	1st	12	26	6	8	13	23–31	25	Winners	
2008	1st	6	30	13	8	9	40–34	47	Round of 16	
2009	1st	5	26	10	8	8	30–24	38	Round of 32	
2010	1st	5	33	12	10	11	48–40	46	Round of 32	
2011	1st	10	33	8	11	14	38–46	35	Quarter-finals	
2012	1st	8	30	8	5	17	27–38	29	Quarter-finals	
2013	1st	8	32	11	7	14	32–41	40	Quarter-finals	
2014	1st	11	32	7	5	20	29–68	26	Round of 16	
2015	1st	12	26	7	3	16	23–42	24	Quarter-finals	
2016	1st	8	30	11	7	12	38–38	40	Round of 16	
2017	1st	4	30	14	9	7	47–26	51	Winners	
2018	1st	6	30	14	10	6	52–30	52	Winners	
2019	1st	1	30	23	6	1	70–22	75	Round of 16	
2020	1st	4	30	17	3	10	63–40	54	Runner-up	
2021	1st	6	30	8	14	8	32-32	38	Round of 16	
2022	1st	13	30	5	12	13	29-43	27	Quarter-finals	
2023	1st	10	28	9	3	16	33-50	30	Round of 16	

== European record ==
Season	Competition	Round		Club	Home	Away	Agg.
2007–08	UEFA Cup	1Q	(Latvia)	Liepājas Metalurgs	1–2	1–1	2–3
2017–18	UEFA Europa League	2Q	(Austria)	Rheindorf Altach	0–3	1–1	1–4
2018–19	UEFA Europa League	2Q	(Greece)	Atromitos	4–3	1–1	5–4
2018–19	UEFA Europa League	3Q	(Cyprus)	Apollon Limassol	1–0	0–4	1–4
2020–21	UEFA Champions League	1Q	(Kazakhstan)	Astana	6–3	—N/a	—N/a
2020–21	UEFA Champions League	2Q	(Bosnia and Herzegovina)	Sarajevo	2–1	—N/a	—N/a
2020–21	UEFA Champions League	3Q	(Israel)	Maccabi Tel Aviv	—N/a	0–1	—N/a
2020–21	UEFA Europa League	PO	(Bulgaria)	Ludogorets Razgrad	0–2	—N/a	—N/a
2021–22	UEFA Europa Conference League	2Q	(Czech Republic)	Viktoria Plzeň	1–2	1–2	2–4
2025–26	UEFA Conference League	1Q	(Montenegro)	Sutjeska	0–2	2–1	2−3

== Managers ==
- (Soviet Union) Eduard Malofeyev (1977–1978)
- (Soviet Union) Ivan Schyokin (1 Jan 1985 – 31 December 1986)
- (Soviet Union) Liudas Rumbutis (1 Jan 1987 – 31 December 1990)
- (Belarus) Yuri Kurnenin (1 Jan 1991 – 31 December 1992)
- (Belarus) Vladimir Gevorkyan (1 Jan 1994 – 1 January 1997)
- (Belarus) Viktor Sokol (2001)
- (Belarus) Andrey Sosnitsky (1 Jan 2002 – 1 January 2003)
- (Belarus) Vladimir Gevorkyan (1 July 2003 – 30 December 2003)
- (Latvia) Viktors Ņesterenko (9 Jan 2004 – 31 May 2004)
- (Belarus) Vladimir Kurnev (1 June 2004 – 30 November 2004)
- (Belarus) Mikhail Markhel (1 Jan 2005 – 5 December 2005)
- (Belarus) Sergei Borovsky (6 Dec 2005 – 31 December 2006)
- (Belarus) Vladimir Gevorkyan (1 Jan 2007 – 28 April 2008)
- (Belarus) Vyacheslav Arushanov (interim) (29 April 2008 – 11 June 2008)
- (Belarus) Evgeni Trotsyuk (12 June 2008 – 5 August 2009)
- (Belarus) Sergey Kovalchuk (interim) (6 Aug 2009 – 15 September 2009)
- (Belarus) Yury Puntus (16 September 2009 – 12 July 2011)
- (Belarus) Sergey Kovalchuk (13 July 2011 – 8 July 2012)
- (Belarus) Vladimir Kurnev (9 July 2012 – 20 September 2013)
- (Belarus) Andrey Prokopyuk (interim) (21 September 2013 – 24 September 2013)
- (Belarus) Sergey Kovalchuk (25 September 2013 – 4 December 2016)
- (Belarus) Uladzimir Zhuravel (4 Dec 2016 – Dec 2017)
- (Czech Republic) Radoslav Látal (Jan 2018 – May 2018)
- (Belarus) Sergey Kovalchuk (May 2018 – June 2018)
- (Belarus) Aleksey Shpilevsky (June 2018 – August 2018)
- (Czech Republic) Marcel Lička (August 2018 – December 2019)
- (Belarus) Sergey Kovalchuk (January 2020 – )
