= FC Torpedo Mogilev =

Torpedo Mogilev
- Founded: 1959; 66 years ago 2014; 11 years ago (reformed)
- Dissolved: 2005; 20 years ago
- Ground: Torpedo Stadium, Mogilev, Belarus
- Capacity: 3,500
- League: Belarusian Second League
- 2016: 10th
Home colours	Away colours

FC Torpedo Mogilev is a Belarusian football club based in Mogilev.

== History ==
The club was formed in 1959 as Kirovets Mogilev. During 1962–1963, the team played in the Belarusian SSR League, before submerging to regional and city level competitions. In 1979, the club was renamed to Torpedo Mogilev and joined the Belarusian SSR top league once again. They were third in 1979 and won their only championship title in 1982.

The team began playing in the Belarusian Premier League in 1992. The first two seasons were most successful when they finished 7th (1992) and 8th (1992–93). After that, Torpedo could not get higher than 11th and mostly were struggling against relegation.

In 1996, Torpedo were renamed to Torpedo-Kadino Mogilev. In 2000, the team finished 15th and were relegated to the Belarusian First League. After playing 5 seasons in the First League (2001–2005), Torpedo-Kadino was disbanded.

In 2014, the club was reformed with the original name Torpedo Mogilev to play in the Mogilev city league, and in 2015, the club joined the Belarusian Second League. However, due to financial struggles, the club withdrew from the league after the 2016 season and is currently represented by a youth team on a city level.

=== Notable players ===
Sergei Gorlukovich, a future Olympic champion who went on to play for Spartak Moscow and Borussia Dortmund, started his youth career at Torpedo Mogilev. A number of notable Belarusian players and managers, such as Igor Kriushenko, Andrey Skorobogatko, Aleksandr Sednev, Vyacheslav Geraschenko, Oleg Kubarev, Eduard Baltrushevich, were once players of the club.

=== Name changes ===
- 1959: Kirovets
- 1974: Torpedo
- 1996: Torpedo-Kadino
- 2005: disbanded
- 2014: Torpedo Mogilev

== Honours ==
- Belarusian SSR League champions (1): 1982
- Belarusian Cup runners-up (1): 1995

== League and Cup history ==
Season	Level	Pos	Pld	W	D	L	Goals	Points	Domestic Cup	Notes
1992	1st	7	15	4	8	3	16–14	16	Round of 32	
1992–93	1st	8	32	10	13	9	35–30	33	Round of 16	
1993–94	1st	14	30	5	10	15	20–23	20	Round of 32	
1994–95	1st	11	30	8	12	10	28–32	28	Runners-up	
1995	1st	11	15	4	5	6	17–21	17	Round of 16	
1996	1st	14	30	7	6	17	27–64	27	Round of 16	
1997	1st	15^{1}	30	7	7	16	29–59	28	Round of 16	
1998	1st	12	28	7	8	13	30–40	29	Round of 16	
1999	1st	14	30	6	5	19	30–69	23	Round of 16	
2000	1st	15	30	5	2	23	31–71	17	Round of 32	Relegated
2001	2nd	5	28	14	4	10	29–29	46	Quarter-finals	
2002	2nd	10	30	9	7	14	41–44	34	Round of 32	
2003	2nd	9	30	11	9	10	37–37	42	Round of 32	
2004	2nd	12	30	7	11	12	31–45	32	Round of 32	
2005	2nd	12	30	7	8	15	22–45	29	Round of 64	Disbanded
2006									Round of 64	

- ^{1} Saved from relegation due to withdrawal of two higher-placed clubs.
