= FC Rechitsa-2014 =

Belarusian football club

Rechitsa-2014
- Full name: Football Club Rechitsa-2014
- Founded: 1952
- Dissolved: 2016
- Ground: Central Stadium, Rechitsa
- Capacity: 3,550
- League: Belarusian First League
- 2016: 16th (relegated)
Home colours	Away colours

FC Rechitsa-2014 (Belarusian: ФК Рэчыца-2014) was a Belarusian football club based in Rechytsa.

== History ==
The club was founded in 1952 as Krasnaya Zvezda Rechitsa (Red Star) and spent Soviet years playing in the Belarusian SSR league or in lower regional leagues. In 1960, they became Dneprovets Rechitsa, then Dnepr Rechitsa in 1962. In 1977, they were renamed to Neftyanik Rechitsa (Oiler) and in 1980 to Sputnik Rechitsa (Satellite). In 1991, Sputnik won the Belarusian SSR First League (2nd level).

In 1992, the club was renamed to Vedrich Rechitsa and included to newly created Belarusian Premier League. They played there until 1996, when they finished last and relegated. After three years in the First League, the team returned to the top level and played two more seasons (2000, 2001) and then relegated again. Since 2002, they have been playing in the First League.

In 2004, Vedrich-97 finished as a First League runner-up and was supposed to be promoted to Premier League. However, the club couldn't obtain the license due to insufficient infrastructure and had to stay in the First League.

In 2014, the club was renamed to Rechitsa-2014, and in 2015, they finished last in the First League and were relegated. In early 2016, the club was folded. In 2017, a new club Sputnik Rechitsa was created after DYuSSh-DSK Gomel relocated to the town.

=== Name changes ===
- 1952: founded as Krasnaya Zvezda Rechitsa (Belarusian: Чырвоная Зорка, romanized: Chyrvonaya Zorka)
- 1962: renamed to Dneprovets Rechitsa (Belarusian: Дняпровец, romanized: Dnyaprovets)
- 1962: renamed to Dnepr Rechitsa (Belarusian: Дняпро, romanized: Dnyapro)
- 1977: renamed to Neftyanik Rechitsa (Belarusian: Нафтавік, romanized: Naftavik)
- 1980: renamed to Sputnik Rechitsa (Belarusian: Спадарожнік, romanized: Spadarozhnik)
- 1992: renamed to Vedrich Rechitsa (Belarusian: Ведрыч Рэчыца, romanized: Vedrych Rechytsa)
- 1997: renamed to Vedrich-97 Rechitsa
- 2014: renamed to Rechitsa-2014

== Honours ==
- Belarusian Cup
  - Runners-up (1): 1993

== League and cup history ==
Previous Vedrich-97 logo.

Season	Level	Pos	Pld	W	D	L	Goals	Points	Domestic Cup	Notes
1992	1st	8	15	6	3	6	17–19	15	Round of 32	
1992–93	1st	15	32	7	7	18	30–61	21	Runners-up	
1993–94	1st	12	30	7	7	16	20–41	21	Round of 16	
1994–95	1st	9	30	10	8	12	24–33	28	Quarter-finals	
1995	1st	14	15	4	3	8	22–20	15	Round of 32	
1996	1st	16	30	4	3	23	14–57	15	Round of 32	Relegated
1997	2nd	6	30	13	7	10	44–34	46	Round of 16	
1998	2nd	6	30	13	6	11	42–37	45	Round of 32	
1999	2nd	2	30	16	10	4	56–30	58	Round of 32	Promoted
2000	1st	12	30	6	11	13	23–36	29	Round of 32	
2001	1st	14	26	2	2	22	17–60	8	Semi-finals	Relegated
2002	2nd	4	30	19	4	7	55–25	61	Round of 16	
2003	2nd	4	30	16	5	9	52–29	53	Round of 32	
2004	2nd	2^{1}	30	18	8	4	46–21	62	Round of 32	
2005	2nd	8	30	11	6	13	37–41	39	Round of 32	
2006	2nd	7	26	10	6	10	31–32	36	Round of 32	
2007	2nd	10	26	9	6	11	29–26	33	Round of 16	
2008	2nd	6	26	12	3	11	39–34	39	Round of 32	
2009	2nd	8	26	10	5	11	40–47	35	Round of 32	
2010	2nd	14	30	8	6	16	29–46	30	Round of 32	
2011	2nd	6	30	13	7	10	40–34	46	Round of 32	
2012	2nd	7	28	9	12	7	40–24	39	Round of 16	
2013	2nd	12	30	9	12	9	47–36	39	Round of 32	

- ^{1} Club was unable to obtain Premier League license and had to stay in the First League.
