= FC Naftan Novopolotsk =

Naftan Novopolotsk
- Full name: Football Club Naftan Novopolotsk
- Founded: 1963; 63 years ago
- Ground: Atlant Stadium; Novopolotsk, Belarus
- Capacity: 5,300
- Manager: Aleksandr Khrapkovsky
- League: Belarusian Premier League
- 2025: Belarusian Premier League, 13th of 16
Home colours	Away colours

FC Naftan Novopolotsk (Belarusian: ФК Нафтан Наваполацк, FK Naftan Navapolatsk) is a Belarusian professional football club based in Novopolotsk. They play in the Belarusian First League, the second division in Belarusian football. Their home stadium is Atlant Stadium.

== History ==
The club was founded in 1963.

=== Name changes ===
- 1963: Formed as Neftyanik Novopolotsk
- 1981: Renamed Dvina Novopolotsk
- 1989: Renamed Kommunalnik Novopolotsk
- 1992: Renamed Naftan Novopolotsk
- 1995: Renamed Naftan-Devon Novopolotsk
- 2001: Renamed Naftan Novopolotsk

== Achievements ==
- Belarusian Cup
  - Winners (2): 2009, 2012

== Current squad ==
As of 8 September 2026

Note: Flags indicate national team as defined under FIFA eligibility rules; some limited exceptions apply. Players may hold more than one non-FIFA nationality.

No.	Pos.	Nation	Player
5	DF	BLR	Andrey Lebedzew
6	MF	BLR	Kirill Adamovich (on loan from Dinamo Minsk)
7	DF	BLR	Aleksey Tumanov (on loan from Minsk)
8	DF	RUS	Andrey Stefanishin
9	MF	KAZ	Vadim Yakovlev
10	MF	BLR	Aleksandr Savitsky (on loan from Gomel)
11	MF	BLR	Ignat Pranovich
13	GK	BLR	Aleksey Kharitonovich
14	DF	BLR	Ivan Chmut
16	GK	BLR	Denis Sadovsky
17	MF	BLR	Vladislav Krolik (on loan from Torpedo-BelAZ Zhodino)
20	MF	BLR	Yegor Leshchenok
21	MF	BLR	Kirill Kirkitskiy
22	MF	BLR	Vladislav Fezhenko
24	MF	BLR	Ilya Seleznyov

No.	Pos.	Nation	Player
25	FW	BLR	Matvey Susha
30	FW	KAZ	Marlen Aymanov
42	DF	NGR	Jonathan John
50	MF	ZAM	Golden Mafwenta
57	FW	RUS	Timur Galimzyanov
69	DF	RUS	Roman Khadzhiev
71	GK	BLR	Aleksandr Naumovich
88	DF	BLR	Artem Drabatovich
94	FW	BLR	Artyom Voskoboynikov (on loan from Dinamo Minsk)
97	DF	BLR	Vasily Chernyavsky (on loan from Dinamo Minsk)
—	DF	RUS	Abakar Akaev
—	GK	UKR	Denys Shelikhov
—	GK	BLR	Aleksandr Titov
—	MF	BLR	Yevgeny Zemko

== League and Cup history ==
Season	Level	Pos	Pld	W	D	L	Goals	Points	Domestic Cup	Notes
1992	3rd	10	15	5	5	5	24–20	15	Round of 64	
1992–93	3rd	2	30	19	8	3	71–20	46	Round of 16	
1993–94	3rd	3	34	22	5	7	88–31	49		
1994–95	3rd	1	22	20	1	1	65–15	41	Round of 16	Promoted
1995	2nd	1	14	10	2	2	29–14	32	Round of 32	Promoted
1996	1st	7	30	13	4	13	43–52	43	Round of 32	
1997	1st	9	30	10	9	11	40–33	39	Round of 32	
1998	1st	13	28	7	4	17	30–40	29	Round of 16	
1999	1st	12	30	8	4	18	39–63	28	Round of 16	
2000	1st	13	30	5	7	18	25–69	22	Round of 16	
2001	1st	13	26	4	2	20	18–51	14	Round of 32	Relegated
2002	2nd	2	30	21	5	4	56–23	68	Round of 16	Promoted
2003	1st	8	30	10	5	15	39–49	35	Round of 32	
2004	1st	10	30	10	5	15	45–50	35	Semi-finals	
2005	1st	9	26	10	3	13	43–44	33	Round of 16	
2006	1st	7	26	11	4	11	45–42	37	Round of 16	
2007	1st	7	26	9	9	8	28–30	36	Round of 32	
2008	1st	7	30	13	7	10	41–35	46	Round of 32	
2009	1st	4	26	12	2	12	29–39	38	Winners	
2010	1st	7	33	11	11	11	41–34	44	Quarter-finals	
2011	1st	7	33	10	7	16	35–45	37	Quarter-finals	
2012	1st	9	30	7	8	15	23–40	29	Winners	
2013	1st	10	32	9	10	13	29–41	37	Round of 32	
2014	1st	5	32	11	10	11	40–43	43	Round of 32	
2015	1st	9	26	8	6	12	34-35	30	Round of 16	
2016	1st	13	30	7	8	15	25-46	29	Round of 8	

== Naftan in European Cups ==
Season	Competition	Round		Club	1st Leg	2nd Leg
2009–10	UEFA Europa League	2Q	(Belgium)	Gent	2–1 (H)	0–1 (A)
2012–13	UEFA Europa League	2Q	(Serbia)	Red Star Belgrade	3–4 (H)	3–3 (A)

== Managers ==
- (Belarus) Vasily Zaitsev (Jan 1, 2004 – May 27, 2004)
- (Belarus) Vyacheslav Akshayev (May 27, 2004 – May 13, 2007)
- (Belarus) Igor Kovalevich (May 14, 2007 – Dec 12, 2012)
- (Russia) Pavel Kucherov (Dec 27, 2012 – June 20, 2013)
- (Belarus) Valery Strypeykis (June 21, 2013 – Aug 23, 2016)
- (Russia) Oleg Sidorenkov (Aug 24, 2016–)

== See also ==
- Naftan Oil Refinery
