= FC Belshina Bobruisk =

Belshina Bobruisk
- Full name: Football Club Belshina
- Founded: 1976; 50 years ago
- Ground: Spartak Stadium, Bobruisk
- Capacity: 3,700
- Chairman: Vitaliy Bylinin
- Manager: Alyaksandr Valadzko (caretaker)
- League: Belarusian Premier League
- 2025: Belarusian First League, 4th of 18 (Promoted via Play-offs)
- Website: www.fcbelshina.by
Home colours	Away colours

FC Belshina Bobruisk (Belarusian: ФК "Белшына Бабруйск", FK Belshyna Babruisk) is a Belarusian professional football club based in Bobruisk. The team has won one Belarusian Premier League title, as well as 3 Belarusian Cup titles.

== History of the club and football in Bobruisk ==
The city of Bobruisk was represented by its football team as early as 1920s, when in 1926 a collective football team of Bobruisk city won the Belarusian football championship. Winning in 1926, Bobruisk football team became the first from a provincial city that won the republican competitions. Until 1958, it was the only achievement of the Bobruisk football. In 1958, Spartak Bobruisk became a champion of Belarus donating the second title to the Bobruisk city football.

In 1972 and 1973, Stroitel Bobruisk also won a title of the champion of Belarus.

The current club was founded in 1976 as Shinnik Bobruisk. Since the inception the team was attached to and later sponsored by local tire manufacturing company Belshina. The club spent most of Soviet-era seasons in the Belarusian SSR league (with a couple of seasons in the Mogilev Oblast league). Shinnik won the league title twice (in 1978 and 1987) and also won the Belarusian SSR Cup in 1979.

In 1992, Shinnik joined the Belarusian First League and in 1994, they were promoted to the Premier League. In 1996, they were renamed to Belshina Bobruisk. The club's most successful seasons came in the late 1990s and early 2000s. Belshina won the champions title in 2001, finished as runners-up in 1997 and won the Belarusian Cup three times (1997, 1999, 2001).

=== Name changes ===
- 1976: Founded as Shinnik Bobruisk
- 1996: Renamed to Belshina Bobruisk

== Honours ==
- Belarusian Premier League
  - Winners (1): 2001
  - Runners-up (1): 1997
  - 3rd place (2): 1996, 1998
- Belarusian Cup
  - Winners (3): 1997, 1999, 2001

== Current squad ==
As of 25 August, 2026

Note: Flags indicate national team as defined under FIFA eligibility rules; some limited exceptions apply. Players may hold more than one non-FIFA nationality.

No.	Pos.	Nation	Player
1	GK	BLR	Nikita Kashuy
2	DF	RUS	Nikita Nikonorov
3	DF	BLR	Aleksandr Kuchinskiy
4	MF	BLR	Vladislav Solanovich
5	MF	BLR	Pavel Seleznev
6	DF	RUS	Daniil Lazarev
7	FW	BLR	Arseniy Achapovskiy (on loan from Gomel)
8	MF	BLR	Vladislav Rusenchik
9	FW	BLR	Aleksandr Shvedchikov
10	MF	BLR	Yury Kazlow
11	MF	GAB	Shorla Aboghe
14	DF	RUS	Vladislav Davydov
15	MF	BLR	Kirill Malykh

No.	Pos.	Nation	Player
17	DF	BLR	Ilya Vikhrov
18	FW	BLR	Mikita Nyakrasaw
19	MF	BLR	Nikita Sokolovskiy
21	FW	RUS	Nikita Golub
22	DF	BLR	Dmitry Malashkevich
23	MF	BLR	Vladislav Bolotnikov
25	GK	KAZ	Abdukhalil Makhmudov
27	FW	RUS	Luka Zgursky
31	GK	BLR	Pavel Prishivalko
54	GK	BLR	Nikita Patsenko
66	DF	BLR	Kirill Bolotnikov
77	MF	BLR	Vladislav Kovalev
78	DF	BLR	Gleb Yakushevich

=== Out on loan ===
Note: Flags indicate national team as defined under FIFA eligibility rules; some limited exceptions apply. Players may hold more than one non-FIFA nationality.

No.	Pos.	Nation	Player
99	FW	BLR	Daniil Kulikow (at Osipovichi)
—	MF	BLR	Stanislav Lomako (at Osipovichi)
—	MF	BLR	Aleksandr Minkevich (at Osipovichi)

== Domestic results ==
Season	League									Belarusian Cup	Top goalscorer		Managers
Season	Div.	Pos.	Pl.	W	D	L	GS	GA	P	Belarusian Cup	Name	League	Managers
1992	2nd	2nd	15	11	2	2	24	6	25	Round of 32	Dmitry Klyuiko	11	
1992–93	2nd	1st	30	21	8	1	69	19	50	Round of 32	Dmitry Klyuiko	18	
1993–94	1st	7th	30	15	1	14	41	41	31	Quarterfinal	Vladimir Putrash	12	
1994–95	1st	13th	30	7	9	14	31	50	23	Semifinal	Sergey Ulezlo	11	
1995	1st	15th	15	4	3	8	17	29	15	Round of 32	Vladimir Putrash	6	
1996	1st	3rd	30	20	3	7	67	32	63	Round of 32	Andrey Khlebasolaw	34	
1997	1st	2nd	30	21	3	6	67	30	66	Champions	Andrey Khlebasolaw	19	
1998	1st	3rd	28	17	6	5	47	17	57	Round of 32			Liudas Rumbutis
1999	1st	8th	30	13	6	11	52	42	45	Champions			Liudas Rumbutis
2000	1st	9th	30	11	5	14	42	38	38	Semifinal			
2001	1st	1st	30	17	4	5	43	20	55	Champions	Aleksandr Sednyov	10	
2002	1st	8th	26	12	4	10	44	38	37^{1}	Round of 16	Valery Strypeykis	18	
2003	1st	10th	30	8	8	14	44	50	32	Semifinal	Aleksey Denisenya	12	Liudas Rumbutis
2004	1st	16th	30	2	6	22	21	62	12	Round of 16			Vladimir Gevorkyan; Oleg Volokh (Interim); Sergei Borovsky
2005	2nd	1st	30	23	4	3	61	19	73	Quarterfinal	Oleksiy Kopylchenko	12	
2006	1st	14th	26	1	6	19	16	46	9	First round			Oleg Volokh; Mikhail Markhel
2007	2nd	4th	26	15	7	4	46	26	49^{1}	Round of 32			
2008	2nd	3rd	26	15	4	7	34	21	49	Round of 32			
2009	2nd	1st	26	20	4	2	55	15	64	Round of 16	Oleksiy Kopylchenko	12	Aleksandr Sednyov
2010	1st	6th	33	12	9	12	31	42	45	Round of 16			Aleksandr Sednyov
2011	1st	5th	33	12	12	9	41	35	48	Semifinal	Yahor Zubovich	11	Aleksandr Sednyov
2012	1st	7th	30	7	9	14	26	40	30	Round of 16			Sergey Yaromko; Vitaliy Pavlov (Caretaker); Aleksandr Sednyov
2013	1st	7th	32	15	8	9	42	38	53	Quarterfinal	Mikhail Gordeychuk	8	Aleksandr Sednyov
2014	1st	10th	32	8	8	16	42	56	32	Quarterfinal	Dmitri Khlebosolov	10	Aleksandr Sednyov
2015	1st	4th	26	12	7	7	39	19	43	Quarterfinal	Serhiy Rozhok	8	Aleksandr Sednyov
2016	1st	15th	30	5	10	15	34	45	25	Quarterfinal	Joel Fameyeh	10	Vitaliy Pavlov
2017	2nd	5th	30	14	7	9	56	30	47^{2}	Round of 32			Vladimir Golmak; Eduard Gradoboyev (Caretaker)
2018	2nd	3rd	28	18	5	5	59	23	59	Round of 32	Dmitry Gomza	17	Georgy Kondratyev; Eduard Gradoboyev
2019	2nd	1st	28	21	5	2	74	22	68	Quarterfinal	Aleksandr Yushin	26	Yury Puntus; Eduard Gradoboyev
2020	1st	15th	30	5	6	19	34	71	21	Round of 32	Leonid Kovel	9	Eduard Gradoboyev; Dmitriy Migas (Caretaker)

- ^{1} 3 points deducted for unpaid transfer.
- ^{2} 2 points deducted due to transfer irregularities in the previous season.

== European results ==
As of match played 7 August 2002

Competition	Pld	W	D	L	GF	GA
UEFA Cup Winners' Cup	4	1	1	2	6	7
UEFA Cup	6	0	2	4	3	14
UEFA Champions League	4	1	1	2	3	7
Total	14	2	4	8	12	28

Season	Competition	Round	Club	Home	Away	Aggregate
1997–98	UEFA Cup Winners' Cup	QR	(Estonia) Sadam Tallinn	4–1	1–1	5–2
1997–98	UEFA Cup Winners' Cup	1R	(Russia) Lokomotiv Moscow	1–2	0–3	1–5
1998–99	UEFA Cup	1Q	(Bulgaria) CSKA Sofia	1–3	0–0	1–3
1999–2000	UEFA Cup	QR	(Cyprus) Omonia	1–5	0–3	1–8
2001–02	UEFA Cup	QR	(Slovakia) Ružomberok	0–0	1–3	1–3
2002–03	UEFA Champions League	1Q	(Northern Ireland) Portadown	3–2	0–0	3–2
2002–03	UEFA Champions League	2Q	(Israel) Maccabi Haifa	0–1	0–4	0–5

== Managers ==
- (Belarus) Liudas Rumbutis (July 1, 1998 – Dec 31, 1999), (Jan 1, 2003 – Dec 31, 2003)
- (Belarus) Vladimir Gevorkyan (Jan 1, 2003 – Jan 13, 2004)
- (Belarus) Oleg Volokh (interim) (May 14, 2004 – May 27, 2004)
- (Belarus) Sergei Borovsky (Sept 3, 2004 – Dec 31, 2004)
- (Belarus) Oleg Volokh (Jan 1, 2006 – May 11, 2006)
- (Belarus) Mikhail Markhel (May 16, 2006 – Dec 31, 2006)
- (Belarus) Aleksandr Sednyov (Jan 1, 2009 – Nov 30, 2011)
- (Belarus) Sergey Yaromko (Jan 1, 2012 – July 21, 2012)
- (Ukraine) Vitaliy Pavlov (caretaker) (July 21, 2012 – July 23, 2012)
- (Belarus) Aleksandr Sednyov (July 23, 2012 – December 31, 2015)
- (Ukraine) Vitaliy Pavlov (January 1, 2016 – )
