= 1998 Belarusian First League =

Belarusian First League
- Season: 1998
- Champions: Lida
- Promoted: Lida; Svisloch-Krovlya Osipovichi
- Relegated: Veino Mogilev Raion; Belenergostroy Beloozyorsk
- Matches: 240
- Goals: 670 (2.79 per match)

1998 Belarusian First League was the eighth season of 2nd level football championship in Belarus. It started in April and ended in November 1998.

== Team changes from 1997 season ==
Two best teams of 1997 Belarusian First League (Gomel and BATE Borisov) were promoted to Belarusian Premier League. They were initially replaced by two lowest-placed teams of 1997 Premier League (Torpedo-Kadino Mogilev and Shakhtyor Soligorsk).

Two teams that finished at the bottom of last season's table (Lokomotiv Vitebsk and Stroitel Starye Dorogi) relegated to the Second League. They were replaced by two best teams of 1997 Second League (Dinamo-Energo Vitebsk and Svisloch-Krovlya Osipovichi as the winners of their respective groups).

Following the dissolution of two Premier League clubs (Transmash Mogilev and Ataka Minsk) BFF decided to reinstall both previously relegated clubs (Torpedo-Kadino Mogilev and Shakhtyor Soligorsk) in Premier League. To replace them, Polesye Mozyr Raion and ZLiN Gomel (2nd and 3rd teams of 1997 Second League Group B) were additionally promoted. Veras Nesvizh (Second League Group A runners-up) were offered promotion ahead of ZLiN Gomel but declined.

Before the start of the season Kardan-Flyers Grodno were renamed to Belcard Grodno, Dnepr Rogachev to FC Rogachev and Dinamo-Energo Vitebsk to Dinamo-Energogaz Vitebsk

== Overview ==
Two best teams of the season (Lida and Svisloch-Krovlya Osipovichi) were promoted to the Premier League. Two lowest placed teams (Veino Mogilev Raion and Belenergostroy Beloozyorsk) were initially relegated to the Second League. Belenergostroy Beloozyorsk disbanded at the end of the season and never played in First of Second league again. Belcard Grodno, who finished 8th, also disbanded, and as a result, Veino Mogilev Raion were saved from relegation.

== Teams and locations ==
Location of teams in 1998 Belarusian First League

Team	Location	Position in 1997
Lida	Lida	3
Bereza	Bereza	4
Torpedo	Zhodino	5
Vedrich-97	Rechitsa	6
Kommunalnik	Svetlogorsk	7
Pinsk-900	Pinsk	8
Dinamo-Juni	Minsk	9
Belcard	Grodno	10
Veino	Mogilev Raion	11
Belenergostroy	Beloozyorsk	12
Rogachev	Rogachev	13
Orsha	Orsha	14
Dinamo-Energogaz	Vitebsk	Second League, Group A, 1
Svisloch-Krovlya	Osipovichi	Second League, Group B, 1
Polesye	Mozyr Raion	Second League, Group B, 2
ZLiN	Gomel	Second League, Group B, 3

== League table ==
Pos	Team	Pld	W	D	L	GF	GA	GD	Pts	Promotion or relegation
1	Lida (P)	30	23	5	2	65	19	+46	74	Promotion to Belarusian Premier League
2	Svisloch-Krovlya Osipovichi (P)	30	18	6	6	63	27	+36	60	Promotion to Belarusian Premier League
3	Pinsk-900	30	17	8	5	54	22	+32	59	
4	Dinamo-Juni Minsk	30	17	5	8	61	36	+25	56	
5	Torpedo Zhodino	30	15	10	5	58	31	+27	55	
6	Vedrich-97 Rechitsa	30	13	6	11	42	37	+5	45	
7	ZLiN Gomel	30	12	8	10	42	41	+1	44	
8	Belcard Grodno (R)	30	11	7	12	36	37	−1	40	Disbanded
9	Kommunalnik Svetlogorsk	30	9	11	10	41	27	+14	38	
10	Rogachev	30	8	11	11	26	42	−16	35	
11	Polesye Mozyr Raion	30	10	4	16	39	54	−15	34	
12	Bereza	30	8	8	14	37	48	−11	32	
13	Dinamo-Energogaz Vitebsk	30	7	10	13	32	57	−25	31	
14	Orsha	30	5	8	17	23	59	−36	23	
15	Veino Mogilev Raion	30	5	5	20	31	83	−52	20	
16	Belenergostroy Beloozyorsk (R)	30	2	8	20	20	56	−36	14	Disbanded

Source: rsssf.com
Rules for classification: 1st points; 2nd matches won; 3rd head-to-head (points, matches won, goal difference, goals scored); 4th goal difference; 5th goals scored
(P) Promoted; (R) Relegated

== Top goalscorers ==
Rank	Goalscorer	Team	Goals
1	(Georgia (country)) Zviad Burdzenidze	Lida	23
2	(Belarus) Sergey Shulzhik	Pinsk-900	17
3	(Belarus) Vitaliy Yakushik	Bereza	14
4	(Belarus) Aleksey Denisenya	Dinamo-Juni Minsk	12
4	(Belarus) Alyaksandr Kavalyow	Vedrich-97 Rechitsa	12
4	(Belarus) Vyacheslav Mikhalchenko	Pinsk-900	12

== See also ==
- 1998 Belarusian Premier League
- 1997–98 Belarusian Cup
- 1998–99 Belarusian Cup
