= 1997 Belarusian First League =

Belarusian First League
- Season: 1997
- Champions: Gomel
- Promoted: Gomel; BATE Borisov
- Relegated: Lokomotiv Vitebsk; Stroitel Starye Dorogi
- Matches: 240
- Goals: 677 (2.82 per match)
- Biggest home win: BATE 10–0 Stroitel
- Biggest away win: Bereza 1–7 BATE
- Highest scoring: BATE 10–0 Stroitel

1997 Belarusian First League was the seventh season of 2nd level football championship in Belarus. It started in April and ended in November 1997.

== Team changes from 1996 season ==
Two best teams of 1996 Belarusian First League (Transmash Mogilev and Kommunalnik Slonim) were promoted to Belarusian Premier League. They were replaced by two lowest-placed teams of 1996 Premier League (Obuvshchik Lida and Vedrich Rechitsa).

No teams relegated to lower level by league position due to required league expansion back to 16 clubs. Three clubs were initially promoted from the Second League (BATE Borisov and Veino Mogilev Raion as the winners of their respective groups, and Dnepr Rogachev as a winner of additional play-offs between group runners-up).

FC Kobrin withdrew from the league to amateur level during off-season due to financial troubles and were replaced by Beloozyorsk (who previously lost promotion play-offs against Dnepr Rogachev).

Before the start of the season Obuvshchik Lida were renamed to FC Lida, Vedrich Rechitsa updated their name to Vedrich-97 Rechitsa, Kommunalnik Pinsk were renamed to Pinsk-900, Khimik Svetlogorsk to Kommunalnik Svetlogorsk, Stroitel Bereza to FC Bereza and newcomers FC Beloozyorsk to Belenergostroy Beloozyorsk.

== Overview ==
Two best teams of the season (Gomel and BATE Borisov) were promoted to the Premier League. Two lowest placed teams (Lokomotiv Vitebsk and Stroitel Starye Dorogi were relegated to the Second League.

== Teams and locations ==
Location of teams in 1997 Belarusian First League

| Team | Location | Position in 1996 |
|---|---|---|
| Lida | Lida | Premier League, 15 |
| Vedrich-97 | Rechitsa | Premier League, 16 |
| Kommunalnik | Svetlogorsk | 3 |
| Gomel | Gomel | 4 |
| Pinsk-900 | Pinsk | 5 |
| Dinamo-Juni | Minsk | 6 |
| Torpedo | Zhodino | 7 |
| Orsha | Orsha | 8 |
| Lokomotiv | Vitebsk | 9 |
| Kardan-Flyers | Grodno | 10 |
| Bereza | Bereza | 11 |
| Stroitel | Starye Dorogi | 13 |
| BATE | Borisov | Second League, Group A, 1 |
| Veino | Mogilev Raion | Second League, Group B, 1 |
| Belenergostroy | Beloozyorsk | Second League, Group A, 2 |
| Dnepr | Rogachev | Second League, Group B, 2 |

== League table ==
| Pos | Team | Pld | W | D | L | GF | GA | GD | Pts | Promotion or relegation |
|---|---|---|---|---|---|---|---|---|---|---|
| 1 | Gomel (P) | 30 | 27 | 1 | 2 | 83 | 9 | +74 | 82 | Promotion to Belarusian Premier League |
| 2 | BATE Borisov (P) | 30 | 25 | 3 | 2 | 92 | 15 | +77 | 78 | Promotion to Belarusian Premier League |
| 3 | Lida | 30 | 20 | 5 | 5 | 59 | 24 | +35 | 65 | |
| 4 | Bereza | 30 | 15 | 6 | 9 | 36 | 34 | +2 | 51 | |
| 5 | Torpedo Zhodino | 30 | 14 | 8 | 8 | 37 | 25 | +12 | 50 | |
| 6 | Vedrich-97 Rechitsa | 30 | 13 | 7 | 10 | 44 | 43 | +1 | 46 | |
| 7 | Kommunalnik Svetlogorsk | 30 | 13 | 6 | 11 | 43 | 42 | +1 | 45 | |
| 8 | Pinsk-900 | 30 | 12 | 8 | 10 | 43 | 36 | +7 | 44 | |
| 9 | Dinamo-Juni Minsk | 30 | 12 | 7 | 11 | 45 | 42 | +3 | 43 | |
| 10 | Kardan-Flyers Grodno | 30 | 9 | 7 | 14 | 36 | 50 | −14 | 34 | |
| 11 | Veino Mogilev Raion | 30 | 9 | 4 | 17 | 27 | 53 | −26 | 31 | |
| 12 | Belenergostroy Beloozyorsk | 30 | 6 | 9 | 15 | 37 | 58 | −21 | 27 | |
| 13 | Dnepr Rogachev | 30 | 6 | 8 | 16 | 30 | 63 | −33 | 26 | |
| 14 | Orsha | 30 | 7 | 3 | 20 | 34 | 61 | −27 | 24 | |
| 15 | Lokomotiv Vitebsk (R) | 30 | 5 | 7 | 18 | 17 | 50 | −33 | 22 | Relegation to Belarusian Second League |
| 16 | Stroitel Starye Dorogi (R) | 30 | 0 | 5 | 25 | 14 | 81 | −67 | 5 | Relegation to Belarusian Second League |

Source: rsssf.com
Rules for classification: 1st points; 2nd matches won; 3rd head-to-head (points, matches won, goal difference, goals scored); 4th goal difference; 5th goals scored
(P) Promoted; (R) Relegated

== Top goalscorers ==
| Rank | Goalscorer | Team | Goals |
|---|---|---|---|
| 1 | (Belarus) Mikalay Ryndzyuk | BATE Borisov | 30 |
| 2 | (Belarus) Ihar Fralow | Gomel | 19 |
| 3 | (Belarus) Andrey Yusipets | Gomel | 18 |
| 4 | (Belarus) Vitaly Shimko | BATE Borisov | 14 |
| 5 | (Georgia (country)) Zviad Burdzenidze | Lida | 13 |
| 5 | (Belarus) Alyaksandr Davidovich | Kardan-Flyers Grodno | 13 |

== See also ==
- 1997 Belarusian Premier League
- 1996–97 Belarusian Cup
- 1997–98 Belarusian Cup
