= 1999 Belarusian First League =

Belarusian First League
- Season: 1999
- Champions: Kommunalnik Slonim
- Promoted: Kommunalnik Slonim; Vedrich-97 Rechitsa
- Relegated: Pinsk-900; Vitbich-Dinamo-Energo Vitebsk
- Matches: 240
- Goals: 688 (2.87 per match)

1999 Belarusian First League was the ninth season of 2nd level football championship in Belarus. The season started in April 1999 and ended in October 1999.

== Team changes from 1998 season ==
The two best teams of the 1998 Belarusian First League (Lida and Svisloch-Krovlya Osipovichi) were promoted to Belarusian Premier League. They were replaced by Kommunalnik Slonim, the last-placed team of 1998 Premier League (only one team has relegated due to Dinamo-93 Minsk dissolution midway through 1998 season).

Two lowest placed teams of the 1998 First League season (Veino and Belenergostroy Beloozyorsk) relegated to the Second League. They were replaced by two best teams of 1998 Second League (Zvezda-VA-BGU Minsk and Granit Mikashevichi as the winners of their respective groups).

During the off-season Belcard Grodno (placed 8th last year) merged with Premier League club Neman Grodno (with the latter being renamed to Neman-Belcard Grodno). To fill the two vacant spots, Veino were spared from relegation, and Neman Mosty (placed 3rd in Second League Group B last year) were additionally promoted. Neman Mosty were invited since Veras Nesvizh (Second League Group A runners-up) refused promotion and Gomel-2 (Second League Group B runners-up) were ineligible.

Before the start of the season Dinamo-Energogaz Vitebsk were renamed to Vitbich-Dinamo-Energo Vitebsk and FC Veino were renamed to Veino-Dnepr after becoming a farm club of Dnepr-Transmash Mogilev. FC Bereza merged with Keramik Bereza from the Second league and adopted the latter's club name as their own.

== Overview ==
The two highest placing teams of the season (Kommunalnik Slonim and Vedrich-97 Rechitsa) were promoted to the Premier League, and the two lowest placed teams (Pinsk-900 and Vitbich-Dinamo-Energo Vitebsk) were relegated to the Second League. Vitbich-Dinamo-Energo Vitebsk subsequently disbanded before the next season.

== Teams and locations ==
Location of teams in 1999 Belarusian First League

Team	Location	Position in 1998
Kommunalnik	Slonim	Premier League, 15
Pinsk-900	Pinsk	3
Dinamo-Juni	Minsk	4
Torpedo	Zhodino	5
Vedrich-97	Rechitsa	6
ZLiN	Gomel	7
Kommunalnik	Svetlogorsk	9
Rogachev	Rogachev	10
Polesye	Kozenki	11
Keramik	Bereza	12
Vitbich-Dinamo-Energo	Vitebsk	13
Orsha	Orsha	14
Veino-Dnepr	Veino	15
Zvezda-VA-BGU	Minsk	Second League, Group A, 1
Granit	Mikashevichi	Second League, Group B, 1
Neman	Mosty	Second League, Group B, 3

== League table ==
Pos	Team	Pld	W	D	L	GF	GA	GD	Pts	Promotion or relegation
1	Kommunalnik Slonim (P)	30	18	5	7	57	29	+28	59	Promotion to Belarusian Premier League
2	Vedrich-97 Rechitsa (P)	30	16	10	4	56	30	+26	58	Promotion to Belarusian Premier League
3	Dinamo-Juni Minsk	30	16	8	6	50	36	+14	56 (Note: Dinamo-Juni Minsk placed above Kommunalnik Svetlogorsk by better head-to-head record (2–2, 2–0).)	
4	Kommunalnik Svetlogorsk	30	16	8	6	45	31	+14	56	
5	Granit Mikashevichi	30	15	9	6	47	25	+22	54	
6	Neman Mosty	30	14	10	6	49	30	+19	52	
7	Torpedo Zhodino	30	11	11	8	55	43	+12	44	
8	Keramik Bereza	30	11	10	9	37	38	−1	43	
9	Orsha	30	10	9	11	46	37	+9	39	
10	Rogachev	30	9	11	10	49	44	+5	38	
11	ZLiN Gomel	30	9	9	12	37	30	+7	36	
12	Zvezda-VA-BGU Minsk	30	8	9	13	38	57	−19	33	
13	Polesye Kozenki	30	7	6	17	32	61	−29	27	
14	Veino-Dnepr Mogilev Raion	30	6	8	16	31	57	−26	26 (Note: Veino-Dnepr placed above Pinsk-900 by better head-to-head record (1–1, 2–1).)	
15	Pinsk-900 (R)	30	6	8	16	33	50	−17	26	Relegation to Belarusian Second League
16	Vitbich-Dinamo-Energo Vitebsk (R)	30	0	5	25	26	90	−64	5	Relegation to Belarusian Second League

Source: rsssf.com
Rules for classification: 1st points; 2nd matches won; 3rd head-to-head (points, matches won, goal difference, goals scored); 4th goal difference; 5th goals scored
(P) Promoted; (R) Relegated

== Top goalscorers ==
Rank	Goalscorer	Team	Goals
1	(Belarus) Georgiy Tatarashvili	Kommunalnik Slonim	22
2	(Belarus) Igor Belyay	Rogachev	18
2	(Belarus) Dzmitry Kavalyonak	Dinamo-Juni Minsk	18
4	(Belarus) Oleg Verbitskiy	Neman Mosty	17
5	(Belarus) Alyaksandr Kavalyow	Vedrich-97 Rechitsa	16

== See also ==
- 1999 Belarusian Premier League
- 1998–99 Belarusian Cup
- 1999–2000 Belarusian Cup
