= 1992–93 Belarusian Cup =

Tournament details
- Country: Belarus
- Teams: 43

Final positions
- Champions: Neman Grodno (1st title)
- Runners-up: Vedrich Rechitsa

Tournament statistics
- Matches played: 46
- Goals scored: 164 (3.57 per match)
- Top goal scorer(s): Sergey Baranovsky (6 goals)

The 1992–93 Belarusian Cup was the second season of the annual Belarusian football cup competition.

Contrary to the league season, it is conducted in a fall-spring rhythm. It began on 24 September 1992 with the preliminary round and ended on 22 June 1993 with the final at the Dinamo Stadium in Minsk.

FC Dinamo Minsk were the defending champions, having defeated FC Dnepr Mogilev in the 1992 final, but were knocked out in the semifinals by the eventual winners FC Neman Grodno.

FC Neman Grodno won the final against FC Vedrich Rechitsa to win their first title.

== Preliminary round ==
The games were played on 24 and 30 September 1992.

Team 1	Score	Team 2
Belarus Maryina Gorka (II)	2–0	Polesye Mozyr (II)
Oresa Lyban (III)	3–2	Viktoriya Kletsk (III)
Stroitel Bereza (III)	2–5	AFViS-RShVSM Minsk (II)
Legmash Orsha (III)	3–2	Tehnolog Ivatsevichi (III)
Kardan-Flyers Grodno (III)	0–4	Shinnik Bobruisk (II)
Kolos Ustye (II)	1–2	Kommunalnik Pinsk (II)
Elektromodul Molodechno (III)	0–2	Derevoobrabotchik Mosty (III)
Ataka-407 Minsk (III)	0–2	Naftan Novopolotsk (III)
Khimik Svetlogorsk (II)	2–2 (a.e.t.) (4–2 p)	Albertin Slonim (II)
Zaria Iazyl (III)	w/o	Spartak Shklow (III)
Belarus Minsk	1–0	Smena Minsk (II)

== Round of 32 ==
The games were played on 7 October 1992.

Team 1	Score	Team 2
Selmash Mogilev (II)	0–2	Khimik Grodno
Niva-Tr. Rez. Samokhvalovichi (II)	0–2	Stroitel Starye Dorogi
Gomselmash Gomel	8–0	Belarus Maryina Gorka (II)
Dnepr Mogilev	3–2	Belarus Minsk
Oresa Lyuban (II)	3–2	Traktor Bobruisk
AFViS-RShVSM Minsk (II)	0–8	Dinamo Minsk
BelAZ Zhodino	5–0	Legmash Orsha (III)
Kommunalnik Pinsk (II)	3–1	Torpedo Minsk
Shinnik Bobruisk (II)	0–0 (a.e.t.) (3–4 p)	Lokomotiv Vitebsk
Derevoobrabotchik Mosty (III)	1–0	Shakhtyor Soligorsk
Naftan Novopolotsk (III)	2–0	Obuvshchik Lida
Vedrich Rechitsa	w/o	Zaria Iazyl (III)
KIM Vitebsk	5–0	Khimik Svetlogorsk (II)
Neman Stolbtsy (II)	0–6	Torpedo Mogilev
Brestbytkhim Brest (III)	1–2 (a.e.t.)	Metallurg Molodechno
Stankostroitel Smorgon (II)	0–3	Dinamo Brest

== Round of 16 ==
The games were played on 14 October 1992.

Team 1	Score	Team 2
Stroitel Starye Dorogi	2–3 (a.e.t.)	Neman Grodno
Dnepr Mogilev	2–0	Gomselmash Gomel
Oresa Lyuban (III)	0–5	Dinamo Minsk
Lokomotiv Vitebsk	1–0	BelAZ Zhodino
Derevoobrabotchik Mosty (III)	1–3	Kommunalnik Pinsk (II)
Naftan Novopolotsk	1–2	Vedrich Rechitsa
Dinamo Brest	1–1 (a.e.t.) (9–10 p)	Metallurg Molodechno
Torpedo Mogilev	1–3	KIM Vitebsk

== Quarterfinals ==
The first legs were played on 21 October 1992 and the second legs were played on 5 November 1992.

Team 1	Agg.	Team 2	1st leg	2nd leg
Neman Grodno	3–2	Dnepr Mogilev	0–1	3–1
Lokomotiv Vitebsk	3–10	Dinamo Minsk	1–8	2–2
Kommunalnik Pinsk (II)	1–4	Vedrich Rechitsa	0–1	1–3
Metallurg Molodechno	1–3	KIM Vitebsk	1–0	0–3

== Semifinals ==
The first legs were played on 24 April 1993 and the second legs were played on 2 May 1993.

Team 1	Agg.	Team 2	1st leg	2nd leg
Dinamo Minsk	4–4 (a)	Neman Grodno	2–3	2–1
Vedrich Rechitsa	3–1	KIM Vitebsk	2–0	1–1

== Final ==
The final match was played on 22 June 1993 at the Dinamo Stadium in Minsk.

22 June 1993
18:00 UTC+3

Neman Grodno	2–1	Vedrich Rechitsa
Sysoyev 18'; Mazurchik 28'	Report	Ageyev 84'

Dinamo Stadium, Minsk
Attendance: 11,000
Referee: Vadim Zhuk (Minsk)

Neman Grodno	Vedrich Rechytsa

NEMAN:
GK	1	(Belarus) Yury Svirkov
DF	5	(Belarus) Sergey Miroshkin
DF	2	(Belarus) Henadz Mardas
DF	4	(Belarus) Sergei Gurenko
DF	3	(Belarus) Oleg Sysoyev
MF	7	(Belarus) Dmitry Trosko
MF	6	(Belarus) Viktor Yuiko
MF	9	(Belarus) Marat Belezyako	(substituted off) 80'
MF	10	(Belarus) Sergey Koroza
MF	8	(Belarus) Yury Mazurchik	(substituted off) 74'
FW	11	(Belarus) Sergey Solodovnikov
Substitutes:
DF	12	(Belarus) Aleksandr Zhilyuk	(substituted on) 80'
MF	13	(Belarus) Syarhey Kukalevich
MF	14	(Belarus) Pavel Batyuto	(substituted on) 74'
FW	15	(Belarus) Igor Petrashevich
GK	16	(Belarus) Albert Rybak
FW	17	(Belarus) Yury Danilevich
FW	18	(Belarus) Sergey Bogutsky
Manager:
(Belarus) Stanislav Ulasevich

VEDRICH:
GK	1	(Russia) Oleg Avramov
DF	3	(Ukraine) Viktor Trehubov
DF	4	(Ukraine) Serhiy Khodyrev
DF	2	(Russia) Viktor Kovalev		(substituted off) 34'
DF	5	(Belarus) Aleksandr Porokhov
MF	6	(Russia) Yuri Sautin
MF	8	(Russia) Andrei Novikov		(substituted off) 75'
MF	7	(Russia) Vitaly Loschakov	(yellow card) 66'
MF	9	(Belarus) Gennady Shinkarev
MF	11	(Belarus) Vyacheslav Marchenko		(substituted off) 53'
FW	10	(Russia) Vladimir Skorobogaty
Substitutes:
FW	12	(Russia) Aleksey Ageyev		(substituted on) 53'
MF	13	(Belarus) Gennady Kashkar
DF	14	(Russia) Oleg Kiselyov
DF	15	(Belarus) Valery Shkunov		(substituted on) 34'
GK	16	(Belarus) Nikolay Kondratov
MF	17	(Russia) Yevgeni Zaytsev		(substituted on) 75'
Manager:
(Belarus) Gennady Abramovich
