= 1996 Belarusian First League =

Belarusian First League
- Season: 1996
- Champions: Transmash Mogilev
- Promoted: Transmash Mogilev; Kommunalnik Slonim
- Relegated: Kobrin
- Matches: 156
- Goals: 412 (2.64 per match)

1996 Belarusian First League was the sixth season of 2nd level football championship in Belarus. It started in April and ended in November 1996.

== Team changes from 1995 season ==
Winners of 1995 Belarusian First League (Naftan-Devon Novopolotsk) were promoted to Belarusian Premier League. They were replaced by the lowest-placed team of 1995 Premier League (FC Bobruisk).

Khimvolokno Grodno, who finished 15th, relegated to the Second League, but were disbanded before the start of 1996 season. They were replaced by best teams of 1995 Second League (Maxim-Orsha and Stroitel Bereza). Stroitel Bereza, who finished only second in their Second League group, were promoted instead of MPKC-2 Minsk (who were ineligible for promotion as a farm club).

FC Bobruisk dissolved shortly after the end 1995 season. No other club was accepted to replace them and the league was left once again with 15 clubs instead of 16.

Before the start of the season KPF Slonim were renamed to Kommunalnik Slonim. Second League winners Maxim-Orsha were renamed to Maxim-Legmash Orsha. Brestbytkhim Brest relocated to the city of Kobrin and were renamed to FC Kobrin.

== Overview ==
In June, after 8th matchday, Fomalgaut Borisov and Kimovets Vitebsk withdrew from the league and disbanded. Both clubs were excluded from the table (having not played at least half of the scheduled games), their results were annulled and only 13 clubs continued and finished the season.

Transmash Mogilev won the league and were promoted to Premier League, as were league runners-up Kommunalnik Slonim. No team initially relegated to the Second League as the league was expanded to 16 teams in 1997, although Kobrin withdrew to amateur lever before the start of the next season due to financial troubles.

== Teams and locations ==
Location of teams in 1996 Belarusian First League

Team	Location	Position in 1995
Kommunalnik	Pinsk	2
Fomalgaut	Borisov	3
Kardan-Flyers	Grodno	4
Kommunalnik	Slonim	5
Kobrin	Kobrin	6
Transmash	Mogilev	7
Khimik	Svetlogorsk	8
Gomel	Gomel	9
Lokomotiv	Vitebsk	10
Torpedo	Zhodino	11
Dinamo-Juni	Minsk	12
Stroitel	Starye Dorogi	13
Kimovets	Vitebsk	14
Maxim-Legmash	Orsha	Second League, Group B, 1
Stroitel	Bereza	Second League, Group A, 2

== League table ==
Pos	Team	Pld	W	D	L	GF	GA	GD	Pts	Promotion or relegation
1	Transmash Mogilev (P)	24	14	7	3	47	13	+34	49	Promotion to Belarusian Premier League
2	Kommunalnik Slonim (P)	24	13	6	5	45	17	+28	45	Promotion to Belarusian Premier League
3	Khimik Svetlogorsk	24	12	7	5	31	19	+12	43	
4	Gomel	24	11	9	4	42	19	+23	42	
5	Kommunalnik Pinsk	24	10	8	6	40	19	+21	38	
6	Dinamo-Juni Minsk	24	9	7	8	27	26	+1	34	
7	Torpedo Zhodino	24	8	9	7	24	20	+4	33	
8	Maxim-Legmash Orsha	24	10	2	12	33	45	−12	32	
9	Lokomotiv Vitebsk	24	8	8	8	33	24	+9	32	
10	Kardan-Flyers Grodno	24	9	4	11	39	40	−1	31	
11	Stroitel Bereza	24	6	8	10	23	37	−14	26	
12	Kobrin (R)	24	7	3	14	22	36	−14	24	Relegation to amateur level
13	Stroitel Starye Dorogi	24	0	0	24	6	97	−91	0	

Source: rsssf.com
Rules for classification: 1st points; 2nd matches won; 3rd head-to-head (points, matches won, goal difference, goals scored); 4th goal difference; 5th goals scored
(P) Promoted; (R) Relegated

== Top goalscorers ==
Rank	Goalscorer	Team	Goals
1	(Belarus) Vladimir Pokatashkin	Gomel	17
2	(Belarus) Yuriy Danilevich	Kommunalnik Slonim	13
2	(Belarus) Vitaly Minin	Lokomotiv Vitebsk	13
4	(Belarus) Vladimir Kravchuk	Khimik Svetlogorsk	12
4	(Belarus) Vladimir Provalinskiy	Maxim-Legmash Orsha	12
4	(Belarus) Sergey Solodovnikov	Kardan-Flyers Grodno	12

== See also ==
- 1996 Belarusian Premier League
- 1995–96 Belarusian Cup
- 1996–97 Belarusian Cup
