= 1997 Belarusian Premier League =

Annual soccer tournament

Belarusian Premier League
- Season: 1997
- Champions: Dinamo Minsk (6th title)
- Relegated: Ataka Minsk; Transmash Mogilev
- Champions League: Dinamo Minsk
- Cup Winners' Cup: Lokomotiv-96 Vitebsk
- UEFA Cup: Belshina Bobruisk
- Intertoto Cup: Dnepr Mogilev
- Matches: 240
- Goals: 658 (2.74 per match)
- Top goalscorer: (Belarus) Andrey Khlebosolov (19 goals)
- Biggest home win: Dinamo Mn 7–0 Torpedo-Kadino (8 August 1997)
- Biggest away win: Torpedo-Kadino 1–7 Ataka (13 June 1997); Kommunalnik 1–7 Dnepr (2 July 1997)
- Highest scoring: Dinamo-93 6–3 Transmash (8 July 1997)

The 1997 Belarusian Premier League was the seventh season of top-tier football in Belarus. It started on April 11 and ended on November 11, 1997. MPKC Mozyr were the defending champions.

== Team changes from 1996 season ==
Obuvshchik Lida and Vedrich Rechytsa, placed 15th and 16th respectively, relegated to the First League. They were replaced by two newcomers: 1996 First League winners Transmash Mogilev and runners-up Kommunalnik Slonim. Ataka-Aura Minsk shortened their name to Ataka Minsk

== Overview ==
Dinamo Minsk won their 6th champions title and qualified for the next season's Champions League. The championship runners-up Belshina Bobruisk qualified for UEFA Cup. Bronze medalists and 1997–98 Cup winners Lokomotiv-96 Vitebsk qualified for the Cup Winners' Cup. Originally Torpedo-Kadino Mogilev and Shakhtyor Soligorsk, placed 15th and 16th respectively, were supposed to be relegated to the First League. However, after Ataka Minsk withdrew from Premier League due to bad financial state and two Mogilev teams Dnepr and Transmash merged to form FC Dnepr-Transmash Mogilev, both Shakhtyor and Torpedo-Kadino were allowed to stay in the Premier League.

== Teams and venues ==
Location of teams in 1997 Belarusian Premier League

Team	Location	Venue	Capacity	Position in 1996
MPKC Mozyr	Mozyr	Yunost Stadium (Mozyr)	6,500	1
Dinamo Minsk	Minsk	Traktor Stadium	25,000	2
Belshina Bobruisk	Bobruisk	Spartak Stadium (Bobruisk)	2,500	3
Dinamo-93 Minsk	Minsk	Traktor Stadium	25,000	4
Lokomotiv-96 Vitebsk	Vitebsk	Dinamo Stadium (Vitebsk)	5,500	5
Ataka Minsk	Minsk	Traktor Stadium	25,000	6
Naftan-Devon Novopolotsk	Novopolotsk	Atlant Stadium	6,500	7
Molodechno	Molodechno	City Stadium (Molodechno)	5,500	8
Dnepr Mogilev	Mogilev	Spartak Stadium (Mogilev)	11,200	9
Dinamo Brest	Brest	Dinamo Stadium (Brest)	2,400	10
Shakhtyor Soligorsk	Soligorsk	Stroitel Stadium	5,000	11
Torpedo Minsk	Minsk	Torpedo Stadium (Minsk)	5,000	12
Neman Grodno	Grodno	Neman Stadium	15,000	13
Torpedo-Kadino Mogilev	Mogilev	Torpedo Stadium (Mogilev)	3,500	14
Transmash Mogilev	Mogilev	Spartak Stadium (Mogilev)	11,200	First league, 1
Kommunalnik Slonim	Slonim	Yunost Stadium (Slonim)	1,200	First league, 2

1. Club's regular home ground Dinamo Stadium was reserved for Cup final and international matches during the whole season due to poor pitch conditions. Dinamo had to play all games of the season at different venus (eight games at Traktor Stadium, two at Central Stadium in Smolevichi, one at City Stadium in Lyuban, one at Stroitel Stadium in Soligorsk, one at City Stadium in Molodechno, two at Olympic Center in Stayki)
2. Due to renovation works at Traktor Stadium and clashes with other clubs, one home game was played at Kamvolschik Stadium, four at City Stadium in Molodechno, one at Central Stadium in Smolevichi, one at Urozhay Stadium in Nesvizh, three at Olympic Center in Stayki.
3. Due to renovation works at Traktor Stadium and clashes with other clubs, three home games were played at Kamvolschik Stadium, one at Orbita Stadium, three at City Stadium in Lyuban, one at KFP Drozdy, one at Olympic Center in Stayki.
4. Four games played at Khimvolokno Stadium.
5. Two games played at Shakhtyor Stadium.
6. Due to renovation works at Torpedo Stadium, one home game was played at City Stadium in Lyuban, two games at Torpedo Stadium in Zhodino, three at Kamvolschik Stadium, two at Olympic Center in Stayki.
7. Three games played at Lokomotiv Stadium, two at Khimvolokno Stadium and ten games at Spartak Stadium as club's own Transmash Stadium was not licensed for Premier League.

== Table ==
Pos	Team	Pld	W	D	L	GF	GA	GD	Pts	Qualification or relegation
1	Dinamo Minsk (C)	30	21	7	2	74	24	+50	70	Qualification for Champions League first qualifying round
2	Belshina Bobruisk	30	21	3	6	67	30	+37	66	Qualification for UEFA Cup first qualifying round
3	Lokomotiv-96 Vitebsk	30	18	5	7	46	30	+16	59	Qualification for Cup Winners' Cup qualifying round
4	Dnepr Mogilev	30	15	7	8	48	32	+16	52	Qualification for Intertoto Cup first round
5	Dinamo-93 Minsk	30	14	7	9	53	30	+23	49	
6	MPKC Mozyr	30	12	7	11	39	30	+9	43	
7	Dinamo Brest	30	12	6	12	44	52	−8	42	
8	Torpedo Minsk	30	12	6	12	45	43	+2	42	
9	Naftan-Devon Novopolotsk	30	10	9	11	40	33	+7	39	
10	Neman Grodno	30	10	8	12	32	41	−9	38	
11	Kommunalnik Slonim	30	9	3	18	32	61	−29	30	
12	Ataka Minsk (R)	30	8	6	16	29	44	−15	30	Dissolved after the season
13	Molodechno	30	7	9	14	28	44	−16	30	
14	Transmash Mogilev (R)	30	8	4	18	30	52	−22	28	Merged with Dnepr Mogilev
15	Torpedo-Kadino Mogilev	30	7	7	16	29	59	−30	28	
16	Shakhtyor Soligorsk	30	6	6	18	22	53	−31	24	

Source: rsssf.com
Rules for classification: 1st points; 2nd matches won; 3rd head-to-head
(C) Champions; (R) Relegated

== Results ==
Home \ Away	ATA	BSH	DBR	DMI	D93	DNE	KOM	LVI	MOL	MPK	NAF	NEM	SHA	TMI	TMO	TRA
Ataka Minsk		0–3	0–2	0–2	0–1	0–1	2–0	4–0	3–1	0–0	1–1	2–0	0–0	1–2	0–0	1–0
Belshina Bobruisk	3–0		3–1	1–2	2–1	3–1	4–1	1–2	3–1	1–0	4–1	3–2	1–1	2–1	5–1	1–0
Dinamo Brest	2–2	2–1		2–1	0–2	0–1	5–3	3–1	1–2	2–1	2–0	2–0	3–2	1–1	1–1	2–2
Dinamo Minsk	3–1	0–0	3–0		3–1	3–1	4–0	6–1	1–1	2–0	1–1	2–1	3–0	2–1	7–0	3–1
Dinamo-93 Minsk	1–2	0–2	1–1	0–0		3–0	5–2	1–2	4–1	0–1	0–0	0–0	4–0	2–1	0–0	6–3
Dnepr Mogilev	2–0	3–0	2–0	1–3	2–1		1–0	0–0	3–1	1–2	2–1	1–1	0–0	1–1	3–0	2–0
Kommunalnik Slonim	2–1	1–0	3–1	2–4	2–0	1–7		0–5	2–0	1–0	0–1	1–1	3–1	1–2	1–1	3–1
Lokomotiv-96 Vitebsk	1–0	0–4	4–0	1–2	0–0	1–0	0–0		1–0	1–1	0–2	4–0	3–0	2–1	5–1	3–0
Molodechno	0–1	1–1	1–3	1–1	1–1	1–4	0–1	3–1		0–2	3–2	1–1	3–2	0–0	1–0	2–0
MPKC Mozyr	4–0	0–2	1–1	0–0	1–5	0–1	3–0	0–1	1–1		0–1	4–0	1–0	6–1	2–0	2–0
Naftan-Devon Novopolotsk	6–0	1–2	2–1	2–3	1–0	3–0	1–0	0–1	1–1	0–1		1–1	2–3	0–1	5–1	2–2
Neman Grodno	0–0	0–2	4–1	2–1	1–3	1–1	1–0	1–2	1–0	1–1	1–0		2–0	2–0	0–1	1–3
Shakhtyor Soligorsk	1–0	1–4	3–0	0–4	0–4	2–2	1–0	0–1	0–1	0–4	0–0	1–2		1–1	0–1	1–0
Torpedo Minsk	3–0	1–0	1–3	1–3	0–3	4–3	5–2	0–1	0–0	5–0	2–2	0–2	1–2		3–1	2–0
Torpedo-Kadino Mogilev	1–7	3–4	0–1	1–4	2–3	0–0	2–0	0–0	2–0	3–1	0–0	4–0	1–0	0–2		0–1
Transmash Mogilev	2–1	2–5	4–1	1–1	0–1	0–2	2–0	0–2	1–0	0–0	0–1	0–3	2–0	0–2	3–2	

Source: rsssf.com
Legend: Blue = home team win; Yellow = draw; Red = away team win.

== Belarusian clubs in European Cups ==
Round	Team #1	Agg.	Team #1	1st leg	2nd leg
1997 UEFA Intertoto Cup
Group stage	Dinamo-93 Minsk (Belarus)	1–0	(Netherlands) Heerenveen	1–0	
Group stage	Polonia Warsaw (Poland)	1–4	(Belarus) Dinamo-93 Minsk	1–4	
Group stage	Dinamo-93 Minsk (Belarus)	0–1	(Germany) Duisburg	0–1	
Group stage	Aalborg (Denmark)	2–1	(Belarus) Dinamo-93 Minsk	2–1	
1997–98 UEFA Cup
First qualifying round	Dinamo Minsk (Belarus)	(a) 2–2	(Georgia (country)) Kolkheti-1913 Poti	1–0	1–2
Second qualifying round	Dinamo Minsk (Belarus)	0–3	(Norway) Lillestrøm	0–2	0–1
First round	MPKC Mozyr (Belarus)	1–2	(Georgia (country)) Dinamo Tbilisi	1–1	0–1
1997–98 UEFA Cup Winners' Cup
Qualifying round	Sadam Tallinn (Estonia)	2–5	(Belarus) Belshina Bobruisk	1–1	1–4
First round	Belshina Bobruisk (Belarus)	1–5	(Russia) Lokomotiv Moscow	1–2	0–3
1997–98 UEFA Champions League
First qualifying round	Constructorul Chişinău (Moldova)	3–4	(Belarus) MPKC Mozyr	1–1	2–3
Second qualifying round	Olympiacos (Greece)	7–2	(Belarus) MPKC Mozyr	5–0	2–2

== Top scorers ==
Rank	Name	Team	Goals
1	(Belarus) Andrey Khlebosolov	Belshina Bobruisk	19
2	(Belarus) Uladzimir Makowski	Dinamo Minsk	16
3	(Belarus) Dzmitry Balashow	Belshina Bobruisk	15
3	(Russia) Vladimir Solodukhin	Dnepr Mogilev	15
3	(Belarus) Andrey Turchinovich	Dinamo-93 Minsk	15
6	(Belarus) Dmitry Podrez	Dinamo Minsk	13
6	(Belarus) Maksim Razumaw	Lokomotiv-96 Vitebsk	13
8	(Belarus) Raman Vasilyuk	Dinamo Brest	12
8	(Belarus) Vladimir Putrash	Belshina Bobruisk	12
8	(Belarus) Valery Strypeykis	Naftan-Devon Novopolotsk	12

== See also ==
- 1997 Belarusian First League
- 1996–97 Belarusian Cup
- 1997–98 Belarusian Cup
