= 1997–98 Belarusian Cup =

Tournament details
- Country: Belarus
- Teams: 32

Final positions
- Champions: Lokomotiv-96 Vitebsk (1st title)
- Runners-up: Dinamo Minsk

Tournament statistics
- Matches played: 31
- Goals scored: 92 (2.97 per match)

The 1997–98 Belarusian Cup was the seventh season of the annual Belarusian football cup competition. Contrary to the league season, the competition has been conducted in a fall-spring rhythm. It began on 2 August 1997 with the first of five rounds and ended on 26 May 1998 with the final at the Dinamo Stadium in Minsk.

FC Belshina Bobruisk were the defending champions, having defeated FC Dinamo-93 Minsk in the 1997 final, but were knocked out in the second round by FC MPKC Mozyr.

FC Lokomotiv-96 Vitebsk won the final against FC Dinamo Minsk after extra time to win their first title.

== Round of 32 ==
The games were played on 2, 3 August and 9 October 1997.

| Team 1 | Score | Team 2 |
|---|---|---|
| Torpedo Zhodino (II) | 2–3 | Dinamo Brest |
| Dnepr Rogachev (II) | 0–6 | Torpedo Minsk |
| Kommunalnik Svetlogorsk (II) | 1–2 | Torpedo-Kadino Mogilev |
| Lokomotiv Vitebsk (II) | 0–3 | Belshina Bobruisk |
| BATE Borisov (II) | 4–0 | Ataka Minsk |
| Gomel (II) | 1–2 | Lokomotiv-96 Vitebsk |
| Stroitel Starye Dorogi (II) | 0–7 | Dnepr Mogilev |
| Lida (II) | 4–0 | Transmash Mogilev |
| Vedrich-97 Rechitsa (II) | 0–2 (a.e.t.) | Kommunalnik Slonim |
| Svisloch-Krovlya Osipovichi (III) | 1–1 (a.e.t.) (3–5 p) | Neman Grodno |
| Belenergostroy Beloozyorsk (II) | 1–5 | Dinamo-93 Minsk |
| Bereza (II) | 1–3 | Molodechno |
| Pinsk-900 (II) | 2–4 | Dinamo Minsk |
| Kardan-Flyers Grodno (II) | 0–2 | Shakhtyor Soligorsk |
| Dinamo-Juni Minsk (II) | 0–0 (a.e.t.) (3–4 p) | Naftan-Devon Novopolotsk |
| Veras Vysoka Lipa (III) | 0–1 | MPKC Mozyr |

== Round of 32 ==
The games were played on 16 and 18 October 1997.

| Team 1 | Score | Team 2 |
|---|---|---|
| Dnepr Mogilev | 1–0 | Torpedo Minsk |
| Dinamo Brest | 0–0 (a.e.t.) (2–4 p) | Dinamo-93 Minsk |
| Kommunalnik Slonim | 0–3 | Lokomotiv-96 Vitebsk |
| Molodechno | 4–2 | Naftan-Devon Novopolotsk |
| Neman Grodno | 4–0 | Torpedo-Kadino Mogilev |
| Belshina Bobruisk | 1–2 | MPKC Mozyr |
| BATE Borisov (II) | 1–0 | Lida (II) |
| Shakhtyor Soligorsk | 1–1 (a.e.t.) (2–4 p) | Dinamo Minsk |

== Quarterfinals ==
The games were played on 30 April 1998.

| Team 1 | Score | Team 2 |
|---|---|---|
| Dinamo-93 Minsk | 3–2 (a.e.t.) | Molodechno |
| Lokomotiv-96 Vitebsk | 2–0 | BATE Borisov |
| Dinamo Minsk | 1–1 (a.e.t.) (4–3 p) | Slavia Mozyr |
| Dnepr-Transmash Mogilev | 1–0 | Neman Grodno |

== Semifinals ==
The games were played on 14 May 1998.

| Team 1 | Score | Team 2 |
|---|---|---|
| Lokomotiv-96 Vitebsk | 0–0 (a.e.t.) (4–2 p) | Dinamo-93 Minsk |
| Dinamo Minsk | 1–0 | Dnepr-Transmash Mogilev |

== Final ==
The final match was played on 26 May 1998 at the Dinamo Stadium in Minsk.

26 May 1998
17:00 UTC+3

| Dinamo Minsk | 1–2 (a.e.t.) | Lokomotiv-96 Vitebsk |
|---|---|---|
| Downar 37' | Report | Rahozhkin 90' (pen.); Razumaw 112' |

Dinamo Stadium, Minsk
Attendance: 4,000
Referee: Sergey Shmolik (Brest)
