= 1988 Football Championship of the Belarusian SSR =

Football Championship of the Belarusian SSR – Pershaja Liha Belarusian: Першая ліга чэмпіянату БССР па футболе
- Season: 1988
- Champions: Sputnik Mensk (4th title)

The 1988 Football Championship of the Belarusian SSR (Belarusian: Чэмпіянат БССР па футболе) was the 52nd regular annual competition in football of the Byelorussian Soviet Socialist Republic at all-republican level.

== Overview ==
The championship consisted of two tiers: First (Pershaja) League and Trade Union competitions. Six teams were participating in the All-Union competitions and represented all the regional centers of Belarusian SSR: Dynama Mensk, Dynama Brest, Dnjapro Mahiljow, KIM Vitsebsk, Njoman Hrodna, Homselmash Homiel.

The First League was contested by 28 teams in two groups, and Abutnik Lida won the championship.

== Pershaja Liha ==
=== Group stage ===
==== Group 1 ====
Pos	Team	Pld	W	D	L	GF	GA	GD	Pts	Promotion or relegation
1	Shakhtsjor Salihorsk	26	20	3	3	74	15	+59	43	1989 Pershaja Liha
2	Dzvina Navapolatsk	26	18	4	4	46	17	+29	40	1989 Pershaja Liha
3	SelMash Mahiljow	26	16	4	6	48	24	+24	36	1989 Pershaja Liha
4	SKIF Minsk	26	14	6	6	47	25	+22	34	1989 Pershaja Liha
5	Temp Baranj	26	11	10	5	35	22	+13	32	1989 Pershaja Liha
6	SKB Vitsebsk	26	12	7	7	51	36	+15	31	1989 Pershaja Liha
7	Shynnik Babruisk	26	14	2	10	42	26	+16	30	1989 Pershaja Liha
8	Budawnik Staryja Darohi	26	11	5	10	51	43	+8	27	1989 Pershaja Liha
9	Dnjapro Rahachow	26	9	5	12	28	39	−11	23	1989 Druhaja Liha
10	Metrobud Mensk	26	8	5	13	31	42	−11	21	1989 Druhaja Liha
11	Almaz Homiel	26	7	7	12	37	40	−3	21	1989 Druhaja Liha
12	Dnjapro Mahiljow (res)	26	5	3	18	18	41	−23	13	1989 Druhaja Liha
13	Palesjse Mazyr	26	4	4	18	14	50	−36	12	1989 Druhaja Liha
14	Sputnik Rechytsa	26	0	1	25	15	117	−102	1	1989 Druhaja Liha

Source: rsssf.com

==== Group 2 ====
Pos	Team	Pld	W	D	L	GF	GA	GD	Pts	Promotion or relegation
1	Sputnik Minsk	26	19	5	2	68	21	+47	43	1989 Pershaja Liha
2	Abutnik Lida	26	17	5	4	58	18	+40	39	1989 Pershaja Liha
3	Arbita Minsk	26	13	7	6	35	29	+6	33	1989 Pershaja Liha
4	Tarpeda Minsk	26	12	6	8	29	23	+6	30	1989 Pershaja Liha
5	Tarpeda Zhodzina	26	10	9	7	35	26	+9	29	1989 Pershaja Liha
6	Mashynabudawnik Pinsk	26	12	4	10	40	40	0	28	1989 Pershaja Liha
7	Pedinstytut Brest	26	10	5	11	32	37	−5	25	1989 Pershaja Liha
8	KSOM Vawkavysk	26	9	6	11	30	41	−11	24	1989 Pershaja Liha
9	Awtamabilist Barysow	26	8	8	10	30	32	−2	24	1989 Druhaja Liha
10	Traktar Mensk	26	8	7	11	31	42	−11	23	1989 Druhaja Liha
11	Pramenj Mensk	26	10	2	14	44	42	+2	22	1989 Druhaja Liha
12	Kolas Dziarzhynsk	26	6	6	14	29	46	−17	18	1989 Druhaja Liha
13	Tekstyljshchyk Baranovichi	26	6	3	17	26	68	−42	15	1989 Druhaja Liha
14	Olimp Hrodna	26	3	5	18	22	45	−23	11	1989 Druhaja Liha

Source: rsssf.com

=== Play-off stage ===
Team 1	Agg.	Team 2	1st leg	2nd leg
Shakhtsjor Salihorsk	3–3 (2–4 p)	Sputnik Mensk	2–0	1–3
Dzvina Navapolatsk	3–5	Abutnik Lida	1–4	2–1
Selmash Mahilyow	4–3	Arbita Mensk	3–2	1–1
Tarpeda Mensk	6–1	SKIF Mensk	5–1	1–0
SKB Vitsebsk	-/+	Tarpeda Zhodzina	4–2	-/+
Temp Baranj	1–1 (5–4 p)	Mashynabudawnik Pinsk	1–0	0–1
Pedinstytut Brest	-/+	Shinnik Babruisk	1–4	-/+
KSOM Vawkavysk	2–2 (5–6 p)	Budawnik Staryja Darohi	1–1	1–1
Dnjapro Rahachow	+/-	Awtamabilist Barysow	+/-	+/-
Metrabud Mensk	5–3	Traktar Mensk	2–2	3–1
Pramenj Mensk	-/+	Almaz Homiel	2–3	-/+
Kolas Dziarzhynsk	-/+	Dnjapro Mahilyow (res)	1–0	-/+
Tekstyljshchyk Baranovichi	5–5 (3–4 p)	Palesjse Mazyr	4–1	1–4
Olimp Hrodna	9–2	Sputnik Rechytsa	6–1	3–1
