= 1989 Football Championship of the Belarusian SSR =

Football Championship of the Belarusian SSR – Pershaja Liha Belarusian: Першая ліга чэмпіянату БССР па футболе
- Season: 1989
- Champions: Abutnik Lida (4th title)

The 1989 Football Championship of the Belarusian SSR (Belarusian: Чэмпіянат БССР па футболе) was the 53rd regular annual competition in football of the Byelorussian Soviet Socialist Republic at all-republican level. In the competition took part 48 teams in two tiers.

== Overview ==
The championship consisted of three tiers: First (Pershaja), Second (Druhaja) leagues and Trade Union competitions. Six teams were participating in the All-Union competitions and represented all the regional centers of Belarusian SSR: Dynama Mensk, Dynama Brest, Dnepr Mahiljow, KIM Vitsebsk, Njoman Hrodna, Homselmash Homiel.

The First League was contested by 16 teams, and Abutnik Lida won the championship.

== Pershaja Liha ==
=== Final standings ===
Pos	Team	Pld	W	D	L	GF	GA	GD	Pts	Promotion or relegation
1	Abutnik Lida (C)	30	21	5	4	56	15	+41	47	Republican champions
2	Sputnik Minsk	30	20	6	4	58	25	+33	46	
3	Shakhtsjor Salihorsk	30	17	6	7	55	27	+28	40	
4	BelAZ Zhodzina	30	15	9	6	35	28	+7	39	
5	SelMash Mahiljow	30	14	10	6	44	30	+14	38	
6	Tarpeda Minsk	30	12	10	8	30	24	+6	34	
7	SKB Vitsebsk	30	12	8	10	49	42	+7	32	
8	Budawnik Staryja Darohi	30	11	8	11	41	45	−4	30	
9	Kamunalnik Navapolatsk	30	10	5	15	38	48	−10	25	
10	Arbita Minsk	30	8	8	14	33	46	−13	24	
11	SKIF Minsk	29	6	12	11	26	33	−7	24	
12	Temp Baranj	30	8	5	17	28	57	−29	21	
13	Mashynabudawnik Pinsk	30	7	7	16	35	56	−21	21	
14	Shynnik Babruisk (R)	29	8	4	17	41	44	−3	20	Relegation to Trade Union competitions
15	Pedinstytut Brest (R)	30	7	5	18	29	53	−24	19	Relegation to Druhaja Liha
16	KSOM Vawkavysk (R)	30	6	6	18	28	53	−25	18	Relegation to Druhaja Liha

Source: rsssf.com
(C) Champions; (R) Relegated
