= FC Lokomotiv =

FC Lokomotiv, Lokomotiv FC, or Lokomotiv FK may refer to one of the following association football clubs.

- FC Lokomotiv Moscow
- PFC Lokomotiv Plovdiv
- PFC Lokomotiv Sofia
- FC Lokomotiv-2 Moscow
- FC Lokomotiv-KMV Mineralnye Vody
- FC Lokomotiv Dryanovo
- FC Lokomotiv Gorna Oryahovitsa
- FC Lokomotiv Jalal-Abad
- FC Lokomotiv Kaluga
- FC Lokomotiv Liski
- FC Lokomotiv Moscow
- FC Lokomotiv Nizhny Novgorod
- FC Lokomotiv Saint Petersburg
- FC Lokomotiv Vitebsk (disambiguation)
- FC Lokomotiv Vitebsk (defunct)
- FC Lokomotivi Tbilisi
- PFC Lokomotiv Tashkent
- Lokomotiv-Bilajary FK
- Lokomotiv Cove FC
