= Sergey Yasinsky =

Belarusian footballer and coach

Sergey Yasinsky Сяргей Ясінскі
Personal information
- Date of birth: 7 January 1965 (age 61)
- Place of birth: Vitebsk, Byelorussian SSR, Soviet Union
- Position: Midfielder

Youth career
- Dvina Vitebsk

Senior career*
Years	Team	Apps	(Gls)
1982–1983	Dvina Vitebsk	19	(0)
1984	Trud Molodechno		
1985	Dvina Vitebsk	30	(1)
1986	Dinamo Minsk	0	(0)
1987–1988	KIM Vitebsk	60	(3)
1989	SKB Vitebsk		(7)
1990–1992	Jagiellonia Białystok		
1992–1993	Lokomotiv Vitebsk	52	(13)
1994–1995	Torpedo Mogilev	34	(3)
1995	Dvina Vitebsk	14	(2)
1995–1996	Shimshon Tel Aviv	2	(0)
1996	Lokomotiv-96 Vitebsk	29	(6)
1997	Stadler Akasztó	17	(4)
1997–1998	Dinamo-Energo Vitebsk		
1999–2000	Ozertsy Glubokoye	38	(9)

Managerial career
- 2000: Ozertsy Glubokoye (player-coach)
- 2001–2005: Lokomotiv Vitebsk (coach)
- 2005–2006: Vitebsk
- 2006: Orsha-BelAutoService
- 2007: Gomel (assistant)
- 2008: Lokomotiv Minsk
- 2009: Slavia Mozyr
- 2009: Tiraspol
- 2010: Ordabasy (assistant)
- 2011–2014: PMC Postavy
- 2015: Vitebsk (reserves)
- 2015–2020: Vitebsk
- 2020–2023: Belarus U21
- 2022: Vitebsk
- 2024–2025: Vitebsk
- * Club domestic league appearances and goals

Sergey Yasinsky (Belarusian: Сяргей Ясінскі; Russian: Сергей Ясинский; born 7 January 1965) is a Belarusian professional football manager and former player. From 2020 to 2023, he was the head coach of Belarus national under-21 football team.
