= Zaytsev =

Zaytsev or Zaitsev (Russian: За́йцев) is a Russian last name. It stems from the word заяц (zayats, meaning "hare"). Zaytseva or Zaitseva (За́йцева) is the feminine version of this surname.

Notable people with the surname include:

- Zaytsev family, Russian noble family
- Alexander Zaytsev (disambiguation), several people
- Aleksandra Zaitseva (born 1999), Russian para athlete
- Boris Zaytsev (disambiguation), several people
- Igor Zaitsev (born 1938), Russian chess grandmaster
- Ihor Zaytsev (basketball) (born 1989), Ukrainian basketball player
- Ihor Zaytsev (footballer) (1934–2016), Ukrainian Soviet footballer
- Ivan Zaytsev (volleyball) (born 1988), Italian volleyball player, son of Vyacheslav Zaytsev
- Lyudmila Zaytseva (born 1946), Russian actress
- Mikhail Mitrofanovich Zaytsev (1923–2009), Soviet general and commander of the Group of Soviet Forces in Germany in 1980–1985
- Nikita Igorevich Zaitsev (born 1991), Russian ice hockey player
- Nikolai Zaitsev (born 1989), Russian footballer
- Olga Alekseyevna Zaitseva (born 1978), Russian biathlete
- Philipp Adamovich Zaitzev (1877–1957), Russian entomologist
- Sergei Zaytsev (born 1969), Russian footballer
- Serhiy Zaytsev (born 1974), Ukrainian footballer and football manager
- Slava Zaitsev (1938–2023), Russian fashion designer
- Vasily Zaitsev (pilot) (1910–1961), Soviet ace, twice Hero of the Soviet Union
- Vasily Zaitsev (sniper) (1915–1991), Soviet sniper during World War II and Hero of the Soviet Union
- Vyacheslav Zaytsev (1952–2023), Soviet volleyball player and Olympic gold medalist
- Yevgeni Nikolayevich Zaytsev (born 1971), Russian footballer
- Yevgeni Zaytsev (footballer, born 1968), Russian footballer
- Yury Konstantinovich Zaitsev (1951–2022), Russian weightlifter and USSR Olympic gold medallist
- Yury Mikhailovich Zaitsev (born 1936), Russian physicist
- Zamira Zaytseva (born 1953), middle-distance runner from USSR and Uzbekistan
