= Vyacheslav Sivakov =

Soviet association football player (1938-)

Personal information
- Full name: Vyacheslav Arkadyevich Sivakov
- Date of birth: 19 February 1938 (age 88)
- Place of birth: Bykhaw, Mogilev Oblast, Belarusian SSR
- Position: Goalkeeper

Senior career*
Years	Team	Apps	(Gls)
1958	FShM Minsk		
1958	Plant im. Voroshilova		
1959	Zarya Minsk		
1960	Krasnoye Znamya Vitebsk	12	(0)
1961–1963	Onezhets Petrozavodsk	43	(0)
1964	Naroch Molodechno		

Managerial career
- 1965: SKA Minsk (youth)
- 1965–1966: Neman Grodno (assistant)
- 1966–1971: Neman Grodno (youth)
- 1972–1975: Khimik Grodno (assistant)
- 1975–1990: Khimik Grodno
- 1991: AS Dragons FC de l'Ouémé
- 1992–1995: Kardan-Flyers Grodno (consultant)
- 1996: Neman Grodno
- 1998: Neman Grodno
- * Club domestic league appearances and goals

Vyacheslav Arkadyevich Sivakov (Russian: Вячеслав Сиваков; born 19 February 1938) is a Soviet and Belarusian football manager and footballer who last managed Neman Grodno.

== Early life ==
Sivakov is a native of Bykhaw, Belarus, where he started playing football at a young age.

== Career ==
Sivakov has been regarded as an important football figure in Grodno, Belarus. Besides Belarus, he managed in Benin.
