= Henadz Mardas =

Belarusian footballer and coach (1970–2020)

Personal information
- Date of birth: 12 June 1970
- Place of birth: Minsk, Belarusian SSR
- Date of death: 2 June 2020 (aged 49)
- Height: 1.78 m (5 ft 10 in)
- Position: Defender

Youth career
- 1987–1990: Dinamo Minsk

Senior career*
Years	Team	Apps	(Gls)
1990	Sputnik Minsk		
1991	Zorya Luhansk	24	(0)
1992	Luch Minsk	9	(2)
1992–1998	Neman Grodno	173	(7)
1998–2000	Tavriya Simferopol	24	(0)
2000–2004	BATE Borisov	111	(0)
2005	Neman Grodno	22	(0)
2006–2009	Smorgon	61	(2)

Managerial career
- 2009–2011: Smorgon
- * Club domestic league appearances and goals

Henadz Mardas (Belarusian: Генадзь Мардас; Russian: Геннадий Мардас; 12 June 1970 — 2 June 2020) was a Belarusian professional football player and coach.

== Honours ==
Neman Grodno

- Belarusian Cup winner: 1992–93

BATE Borisov

- Belarusian Premier League champion: 2002

== Death ==
Mardas died on 2 June 2020 from a bowel cancer, which he was initially diagnosed with in 2015.
