= Rogozhkin =

Rogozhkin (Russian: Рогожкин) is a Russian masculine surname, its feminine counterpart is Rogozhkina. Notable people with the surname include:

- Aleksandr Rogozhkin (1949–2021), Russian film director and writer
- Vital Rahozhkin (born 1976), Belarusian football player
