= FC Lokomotiv Vitebsk =

FC Lokomotiv Vitebsk may refer to:

- FC Lokomotiv Vitebsk (defunct), a defunct Belarusian football club which was named SKB Vitebsk (until 1992), SKB-Lokomotiv Vitebsk (1992) and Lokomotiv Vitebsk (1993-2000), before being disbanded in 2001.
- FC Vitebsk, an active Belarusian football club which was named KIM Vitebsk (until 1994), Dvina Vitebsk (1994-1995), Lokomotiv-96 Vitebsk (1996-2002), Lokomotiv Vitebsk (2003-2007) and Vitebsk (since 2008).
