= Yury Konoplev =

Belarusian footballer and coach

Personal information
- Date of birth: 2 February 1962 (age 64)
- Place of birth: Vitebsk, Byelorussian SSR, Soviet Union
- Height: 1.82 m (5 ft 11 1/2 in)
- Position: Defender

Team information
- Current team: Orsha (head coach)

Youth career
- 1979–1981: Dvina Vitebsk

Senior career*
Years	Team	Apps	(Gls)
1982–1983	Dvina Vitebsk	57	(1)
1984	Dinamo Brest	23	(1)
1985–1995	Dvina Vitebsk	298	(13)
1996	Naftan-Devon Novopolotsk	25	(1)
1997–2000	Lokomotiv-96 Vitebsk	79	(4)

International career
1994	Belarus	1	(0)

Managerial career
- 2000: Lokomotiv-96 Vitebsk (assistant)
- 2005–2007: Vitebsk (assistant)
- 2007–2008: Vitebsk
- 2009–2010: Vitebsk
- 2011: Gomel (assistant)
- 2012–2014: Vitebsk
- 2016–2017: Orsha
- * Club domestic league appearances and goals

Yury Konoplev (Russian: Юрий Коноплёв; born 2 February 1962) is a Belarusian professional football coach and former player. He spent the majority of his playing and coaching career in Vitebsk.

== Honours ==
Lokomotiv-96 Vitebsk

- Belarusian Cup winner: 1997–98
