= Vital Rahozhkin =

Belarusian footballer

Personal information
- Date of birth: 21 January 1976 (age 50)
- Place of birth: Minsk, Belarusian SSR
- Height: 1.77 m (5 ft 9 1/2 in)
- Position: Defender

Youth career
- Smena Minsk

Senior career*
Years	Team	Apps	(Gls)
1993–1996	Lokomotiv-96 Vitebsk	66	(2)
1997	Dinamo-93 Minsk	24	(1)
1998	Lokomotiv-96 Vitebsk	27	(3)
1999–2001	BATE Borisov	66	(4)
2001–2002	Siena	14	(0)
2002–2003	BATE Borisov	18	(0)
2003	→ MTZ-RIPO Minsk (loan)	9	(4)
2004	Torpedo-SKA Minsk	10	(0)
2005–2007	Naftan Novopolotsk	64	(4)
2008	Neman Grodno	16	(0)
2009	Smorgon	8	(0)
2009–2010	Slutsksakhar Slutsk	40	(1)

International career
1993–1994	Belarus U18		
1995–1996	Belarus U21	4	(0)

Managerial career
- 2011–2015: BATE Borisov (youth)
- 2016: Smolevichi-STI
- 2017–2023: BATE Borisov (youth)
- 2024–2025: BATE Borisov (assistant manager)
- 2026: BATE-2 Borisov
- 2026: BATE Borisov
- * Club domestic league appearances and goals

Vital Rahozhkin (Belarusian: Віталь Рагожкін; Russian: Виталий Рогожкин; born 21 January 1976 in Minsk) is a retired Belarusian professional footballer.

== Career ==
=== Coaching career ===
From 2011 till 2015 he worked as a coach at BATE Borisov. In January 2016 he joined Smolevichi-STI. He then returned to BATE Borisov. As of October 2019, he was still working for BATE.

== Honours ==
Lokomotiv-96 Vitebsk

- Belarusian Cup winner: 1997–98

BATE Borisov

- Belarusian Premier League champion: 1999, 2002
