= Ilya Baglay =

Belarusian professional footballer

Personal information
- Date of birth: 21 April 1998 (age 28)
- Place of birth: Minsk, Belarus
- Height: 1.74 m (5 ft 9 in)
- Position: Defender

Team information
- Current team: Lida
- Number: 10

Youth career
- 2014–2016: Minsk
- 2016–2018: Gorodeya

Senior career*
Years	Team	Apps	(Gls)
2018–2020	Gorodeya	6	(0)
2021	Slonim-2017	32	(4)
2022	Baranovichi	22	(5)
2023–	Lida	19	(3)
- * Club domestic league appearances and goals as of 31 December 2024

Ilya Baglay (Belarusian: Ілья Баглай; Russian: Илья Баглай; born 21 April 1998) is a Belarusian professional footballer who plays Lida.
