= Alexander Zaytsev =

Alexander Zaytsev is the name of:

- Alexander Zaytsev (artist) (1903–1982), Russian painter and art educator
- Alexander Zaytsev (pilot) (1911–1965), Soviet aircraft pilot and Hero of the Soviet Union
- Alexander Zaitsev (pair skater) (born 1952), Russian figure skater
- Alexander Zaitsev (astronomer) (1945–2021), Russian scientist in radar astronomy and SETI
- Alexander Zaytsev (chemist) (1841–1910), Russian chemist
- Alexander Zaitsev (chess player) (1935–1971), Russian chess grandmaster

== See also ==
- Zaytsev
