= Georgiy Tatarashvili =

Georgian footballer (born 1972)

Personal information
- Date of birth: 15 May 1972 (age 54)
- Place of birth: Kutaisi, Georgian SSR
- Position: Forward

Senior career*
Years	Team	Apps	(Gls)
1993	Torpedo Kutaisi		
1993–2000	Kommunalnik Slonim	170	(51)
2002	Veras Nesvizh	10	(5)
2003–2004	Torpedo-Kadino Mogilev	41	(17)
2004	Kommunalnik Slonim	14	(3)

Managerial career
- 2009–2012: Beltransgaz Slonim (assistant)
- 2022–: Slonim-2017 (assistant)
- 2023: Slonim-2017 (caretaker)
- 2024: Slonim-2017 (caretaker)
- * Club domestic league appearances and goals

Georgiy Tatarashvili (Georgian: გიორგი თათარაშვილი; born 15 May 1972) is a Georgian former footballer.

== Career ==
Tatarashvili started his career with Georgian side Torpedo. In 1993, he signed for Belarusian side Kommunalnik. He helped the club win the league. In 2002, he signed for Belarusian side Veras. In 2003, he signed for Belarusian side Torpedo Mogilev. In 2004, he returned to Belarusian side Kommunalnik.

== Style of play ==
Tatarashvili mainly operated as a striker. He was described as a "large forward".

== Personal life ==
After retiring from professional football, Tatarashvili worked as a youth manager. His team achieved second place at the Leather Ball Tournament.
