= Zviad Burdzenidze =

Georgian footballer (born 1969)

Personal information
- Date of birth: 14 March 1969 (age 56)
- Place of birth: Georgia
- Position(s): Striker

Senior career*
Years	Team	Apps	(Gls)
1993–1994	Magaroeli	15	(3)
1994–2002	Lida	197	(63)
1995	→ KPF Slonim (loan)	2	(1)
2009	Lida	7	(0)
- *Club domestic league appearances and goals

Zviad Burdzenidze (Russian: Звиад Бурдзенидзе; born 14 March 1969) is a Georgian retired footballer.
