= Igor Tymonyuk =

Belarusian footballer

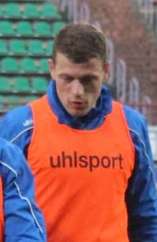

Personal information
- Date of birth: 31 March 1994 (age 32)
- Place of birth: Brest, Belarus
- Height: 1.86 m (6 ft 1 in)
- Position: Midfielder

Team information
- Current team: Lida
- Number: 5

Youth career
- 2011–2013: Dinamo Brest

Senior career*
Years	Team	Apps	(Gls)
2013–2016	Dinamo Brest	28	(1)
2017	Mash'al Mubarek	16	(1)
2018	Slavia Mozyr	26	(4)
2019	Rukh Brest	25	(5)
2020–2022	Slavia Mozyr	64	(2)
2023	Dinamo Brest	16	(0)
2024	Belshina Bobruisk	30	(3)
2025	Slutsk	6	(0)
2025	Saturn Ramenskoye	11	(0)
2026–	Lida	13	(2)

International career
2016	Belarus U21	1	(0)
- * Club domestic league appearances and goals as of 6 July 2026

Igor Tymonyuk (Belarusian: Ігар Тыманюк; Russian: Игорь Тымонюк; born 31 March 1994) is a Belarusian professional footballer who plays for Lida.

== Honours ==
Dinamo Brest

- Belarusian Cup winner: 2016–17
