= Artur Maliyevsky =

Belarusian footballer (born 2001)

Personal information
- Full name: Artur Yuryevich Maliyevsky
- Date of birth: 21 August 2001 (age 25)
- Place of birth: Grodno, Belarus
- Height: 1.84 m (6 ft 0 in)
- Position: Goalkeeper

Team information
- Current team: Neman Grodno
- Number: 1

Youth career
- 2014–2020: Neman Grodno
- 2015–2017: → RGUOR Minsk

Senior career*
Years	Team	Apps	(Gls)
2020–	Neman Grodno	24	(0)
2023	→ Slutsk (loan)	9	(0)
2025–	→ Neman-2 Grodno	1	(0)

International career^{‡}
2017	Belarus U17	1	(0)
2019	Belarus U19	3	(0)
2021	Belarus U21	1	(0)
- * Club domestic league appearances and goals as of 25 November 2025 ‡ National team caps and goals as of 29 March 2021

Artur Yuryevich Maliyevsky (Belarusian: Артур Юр'евіч Маліеўскі; Russian: Артур Юрьевич Малиевский; born 21 August 2001) is a Belarusian professional footballer who plays for Neman Grodno.
