= Boris Zaytsev =

Boris Zaytsev may refer to:

- Boris Zaytsev (writer) (1881–1972), Russian writer and dramatist
- Boris Mikhaylovich Zaytsev (1937–2000), Russian ice hockey player

== See also ==
- Zaytsev
