= Sergey Solodovnikov =

Belarusian footballer (born 1958)

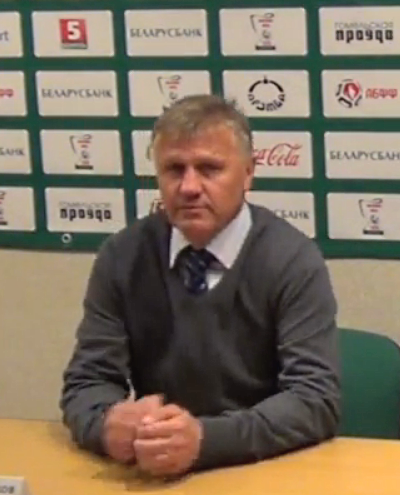
- Solodovnikov in 2015

Personal information
- Date of birth: 2 November 1958 (age 67)
- Place of birth: Irkutsk, USSR
- Height: 1.72 m (5 ft 8 in)
- Position: Forward

Youth career
- 1978: Burevestnik Minsk

Senior career*
Years	Team	Apps	(Gls)
1978–1989	Khimik Grodno	372	(130)
1990–1992	Jagiellonia Białystok	57	(16)
1992–1993	Neman Grodno	36	(17)
1993–1996	Kardan-Flyers Grodno	62	(38)
1994	→ Neman Grodno (loan)	4	(0)
1997	Neman Grodno	16	(5)

Managerial career
- 1997–2005: Neman Grodno
- 2006: Dnepr Mogilev (assistant)
- 2007–2009: Belarus U19
- 2010–2011: Dinamo Minsk (assistant)
- 2010: Dinamo Minsk (caretaker)
- 2011–2016: Neman Grodno
- 2017–2018: Lida
- * Club domestic league appearances and goals

Sergey Solodovnikov (Belarusian: Сяргей Саладоўнiкаў; Russian: Серге́й Солодовников; born 2 November 1958) is a Belarusian professional football manager and former player. Between 2011 and 2016, he was the head coach of Neman Grodno.

== Honours ==
Neman Grodno

- Belarusian Cup: 1992–93
