= List of football clubs in Belarus =

This is a list of football clubs in Belarus.

== Vyšejšaja Liha ==
- BATE Barysaŭ
- Bielšyna
- Dynama Brest
- Dynama Minsk
- Enierhietyk-BDU
- Haradzieja
- Islač
- Minsk
- Nioman
- Ruch Brest
- Šachcior Salihorsk
- Slavija Mazyr
- Sluck
- Smaliavičy
- Tarpieda-BielAZ
- Veino (1998–2000)
- Viciebsk

== Belarusian football clubs in the Soviet competitions ==
During the Soviet period, the Belarusian football competitions were not fully integrated in the All-Union competitions and continued to exist as republican competitions. There was almost no promotion/relegation between the Belarusian football competitions and the All-Union football competitions. Only selected clubs were participating in the All-Union competitions.

- Dinamo Minsk, debuted in 1937 and at the top flight in 1945
  - I tier: (1941), 1945–1950, 1952, 1954, 1955, 1957, 1960–1973, 1976, 1979–1991
  - II tier: 1939, 1940, 1951, 1953, 1956, 1958, 1959, 1974, 1975, 1977, 1978
  - V tier: 1937

(1937: 5th; 1939: 2nd; 1940: 2nd; 1941: 1st; 1945: 1st; 1946: 1st; 1947: 1st; 1948: 1st; 1949: 1st; 1950: 1st; 1951: 2nd; 1952: 1st; 1953: 2nd 2; 1954: 1st; 1955: 1st; 1956: 2nd 1; 1957: 1st; 1958: 2nd 3; 1959: 2nd 2; 1960: 1st; 1961: 1st; 1962: 1st; 1963: 1st; 1964: 1st; 1965: 1st; 1966: 1st; 1967: 1st; 1968: 1st; 1969: 1st; 1970: 1st; 1971: 1st; 1972: 1st; 1973: 1st; 1974: 2nd; 1975: 2nd; 1976: 1st; 1977: 2nd; 1978: 2nd; 1979: 1st; 1980: 1st; 1981: 1st; 1982: 1st; 1983: 1st; 1984: 1st; 1985: 1st; 1986: 1st; 1987: 1st; 1988: 1st; 1989: 1st; 1990: 1st; 1991: 1st)

- Gomselmash Gomel, debuted in 1959 in II tier and higher was never promoted
  - II tier: 1959–1968
  - III tier: 1969–1989
  - IV tier: 1990, 1991

(1959: 2nd 2; 1960: 2nd Rep 1; 1961: 2nd Rep 1; 1962: 2nd Rep 1; 1963: 2nd; 1964: 2nd 1; 1965: 2nd 1; 1966: 2nd 1; 1967: 2nd 1; 1968: 2nd 1; 1969: 3rd Rus 1; 1970: 3rd 1; 1971: 3rd 2; 1972: 3rd 2; 1973: 3rd 2; 1974: 3rd 2; 1975: 3rd 2; 1976: 3rd 1; 1977: 3rd 1; 1978: 3rd 1; 1979: 3rd 1; 1980: 3rd 8; 1981: 3rd 8; 1982: 3rd 5; 1983: 3rd 5; 1984: 3rd 5; 1985: 3rd 5; 1986: 3rd 5; 1987: 3rd 5; 1988: 3rd 5; 1989: 3rd 5; 1990: 4th 5; 1991: 4th 6)

- Dinamo Brest, debuted in 1960 in II tier and higher was never promoted
  - II tier: 1960–1962, 1969
  - III tier: 1963–1968, 1970–1991

(1960: 2nd Rep 1; 1961: 2nd Rep 1; 1962: 2nd Rep 1; 1963: 3rd Rep; 1964: 3rd Ukr 1; 1965: 3rd Ukr 2; 1966: 3rd Rus 1; 1967: 3rd Rus 1; 1968: 3rd Rus 1; 1969: 2nd 4; 1970: 3rd 1; 1971: 3rd 2; 1972: 3rd 2; 1973: 3rd 2; 1974: 3rd 2; 1975: 3rd 2; 1976: 3rd 1; 1977: 3rd 1; 1978: 3rd 1; 1979: 3rd 1; 1980: 3rd 8; 1981: 3rd 8; 1982: 3rd 5; 1983: 3rd 5; 1984: 3rd 5; 1985: 3rd 5; 1986: 3rd 5; 1987: 3rd 5; 1988: 3rd 5; 1989: 3rd 5; 1990: 3rd W; 1991: 3rd W)

- Dnepr Mogilev, debuted in 1960 in II tier and higher was never promoted
  - II tier: 1960–1962, 1983
  - III tier: 1963–1969, 1971–1982, 1984–1991
  - IV tier: 1970

(1960: 2nd Rep 1; 1961: 2nd Rep 1; 1962: 2nd Rep 1; 1963: 3rd Rep; 1964: 3rd Ukr 1; 1965: 3rd Ukr 1; 1966: 3rd Rus 1; 1967: 3rd Rus 1; 1968: 3rd Rus 1; 1969: 3rd Rus 1; 1970: 4th Rus 1; 1971: 3rd 2; 1972: 3rd 2; 1973: 3rd 2; 1974: 3rd 2; 1975: 3rd 2; 1976: 3rd 1; 1977: 3rd 1; 1978: 3rd 1; 1979: 3rd 1; 1980: 3rd 8; 1981: 3rd 8; 1982: 3rd 5; 1983: 2nd; 1984: 3rd 5; 1985: 3rd 5; 1986: 3rd 5; 1987: 3rd 5; 1988: 3rd 5; 1989: 3rd 5; 1990: 3rd W; 1991: 3rd W)

- KIM Vitebsk, debuted in 1960 in II tier and higher was never promoted
  - II tier: 1960–1962
  - III tier: 1963–1969, 1971–1989, 1991
  - IV tier: 1970, 1990

(1960: 2nd Rep 1; 1961: 2nd Rep 1; 1962: 2nd Rep 1; 1963: 3rd Rep; 1964: 3rd Ukr 1; 1965: 3rd Ukr 1; 1966: 3rd Rus 1; 1967: 3rd Rus 1; 1968: 3rd Rus 1; 1969: 3rd Rus 1; 1970: 4th Rus 1; 1971: 3rd 2; 1972: 3rd 2; 1973: 3rd 2; 1974: 3rd 2; 1975: 3rd 2; 1976: 3rd 1; 1977: 3rd 1; 1978: 3rd 1; 1979: 3rd 1; 1980: 3rd 8; 1981: 3rd 8; 1982: 3rd 5; 1983: 3rd 5; 1984: 3rd 5; 1985: 3rd 5; 1986: 3rd 5; 1987: 3rd 5; 1988: 3rd 5; 1989: 3rd 5; 1990: 4th 6; 1991: 3rd W)

- Khimik Grodno, debuted 1964 and at the II tier in 1968, while higher was never promoted
  - II tier: 1968, 1969
  - III tier: 1964–1967, 1970–1991

(1964: 3rd Ukr 1; 1965: 3rd Ukr 2; 1966: 3rd Rus 1; 1967: 3rd Rus 1; 1968: 2nd 1; 1969: 2nd 4; 1970: 3rd 1; 1971: 3rd 2; 1972: 3rd 2; 1973: 3rd 2; 1974: 3rd 2; 1975: 3rd 2; 1976: 3rd 1; 1977: 3rd 1; 1978: 3rd 1; 1979: 3rd 1; 1980: 3rd 8; 1981: 3rd 8; 1982: 3rd 5; 1983: 3rd 5; 1984: 3rd 5; 1985: 3rd 5; 1986: 3rd 5; 1987: 3rd 5; 1988: 3rd 5; 1989: 3rd 5; 1990: 3rd W; 1991: 3rd W)

- SKA Minsk, debuted in 1947 in II tier, the only tier it played
  - II tier: 1947–1949, 1962

(1947: 2nd Centre; 1948: 2nd Centre; 1949: 2nd Centre; 1962: 2nd Rep 1)

- Urozhai Minsk, debuted in 1957 in II tier, the only tier it played
  - II tier: 1957–1960

(1957: 2nd 2; 1958: 2nd 3; 1959: 2nd 2; 1960: 2nd Rep 1)

- Spartak Minsk
  - II tier: 1948, 1949

(1948: 2nd Centre; 1949: 2nd Centre)

- Pischevik Minsk (1954: 2nd 2)
- Bobruisk (1961: 2nd Rep 1)
