= Oleg Avramov =

Russian footballer (born 1968)

Personal information
- Full name: Oleg Viktorovich Avramov
- Date of birth: 3 October 1968 (age 58)
- Place of birth: Bryansk, Russian SFSR
- Height: 1.91 m (6 ft 3 in)
- Position: Goalkeeper

Senior career*
| Years | Team | Apps | (Gls) |
| 1991 | Metalist Kharkiv | 0 | (0) |
| 1991 | Khimik Sieverodonetsk | 32 | (0) |
| 1992 | Kuban Krasnodar | 7 | (0) |
| 1992–1994 | Vedrich Rechitsa | 13 | (0) |
| 1994–1995 | Spartak Bryansk (amateur) | | |
| 1996–1997 | Spartak Bryansk | 49 | (0) |
| 1998 | Dynamo Bryansk | 1 | (0) |
| 1998–1999 | Spartak-Peresvet Bryansk | 40 | (0) |
| 2000 | Bezhitsa Bryansk | | |
| 2001 | Torpedo-MAZ Minsk | 11 | (0) |
| 2003 | Tsement Fokino | | |
- * Club domestic league appearances and goals

Oleg Viktorovich Avramov (Russian: Олег Викторович Аврамов; born 3 October 1968 in Bryansk) is a former Russian football player.

== Honours ==
Vedrich Rechytsa

- Belarusian Cup finalist: 1992/93
