= FC Belenergostroy Beloozyorsk =

Belenegrostroy
- Full name: Football Club Belenegrostroy Beloozyorsk
- Founded: 1994
- Dissolved: 1998
- Ground: Beloozyorsk, Brest Oblast
- League: Belarusian First League
- 1998: 16th

FC Belenergostroy Beloozyorsk was a Belarusian football club based in Beloozyorsk, Brest Oblast.

== History ==
The team was founded in 1994 as FC Beloozyorsk and joined Belarusian Second League the same year. After three seasons the team was promoted to the First League was renamed to Belenergostroy Beloozyorsk after their main sponsor. Belenergostroy spent 2 seasons in the First League, and after finishing at the last, 16th place in 1998 the team was disbanded due to financial troubles. The amateur team holding the name FC Beloozyorsk is currently playing in Brest Voblast championship.
