= FC Vitbich-Dinamo-Energo Vitebsk =

Vitbich-Dinamo-Energo Vitebsk
- Full name: Football Club Vitbich-Dinamo-Energo Vitebsk
- Founded: 1987
- Dissolved: 1999
- Ground: Vitebsk, Belarus

Vitbich-Dinamo-Energo Vitebsk is a defunct Belarusian football club based in Vitebsk.

== History ==
The team was founded in 1987 as Fakel Vitebsk and changed their name to Dinamo Vitebsk a few years later. Between 1987 and 1994 they played in amateur Vitebsk city league and in 1995 and 1996 in Vitebsk Oblast league.

In 1997, they were renamed to Dinamo-Energo Vitebsk and joined Belarusian Second League. After the first successful season the team was promoted to the First League.

They changed their name to Dinamo-Energogaz Vitebsk for 1998 season and later to Vitbich-Dinamo-Energo Vitebsk for 1999. After the end of 1999 season the club was folded due to financial troubles.
