= Yevgeni Zaytsev (footballer, born 1971) =

Russian footballer and official

Personal information
- Full name: Yevgeni Nikolayevich Zaytsev
- Date of birth: 24 February 1971 (age 55)
- Place of birth: Starodub, Bryansk Oblast, Russian SFSR
- Height: 1.83 m (6 ft 0 in)
- Position: Defender

Senior career*
Years	Team	Apps	(Gls)
1988–1991	Dynamo Bryansk	47	(1)
1992–1993	Vedrich Rechitsa	32	(1)
1994	MZKS Wasilków		
1994	SKA Rostov-on-Don	24	(4)
1995–1999	Lada Togliatti	114	(4)

Managerial career
- 2001–2003: Lada Tolyatti (administrator)
- 2004: Chernomorets Novorossiysk (administrator)
- 2006–2009: Nosta Novotroitsk (administrator)
- 2010: Kuban Krasnodar (director)
- 2015–2016: Lada Tolyatti (director)
- 2016–2017: Sochi (director)
- * Club domestic league appearances and goals

Yevgeni Nikolayevich Zaytsev (Russian: Евгений Николаевич Зайцев; born 24 February 1971) is a Russian professional football official and a former player.
