= Staryya Darohi =

Town in Minsk Region, Belarus

Staryya Darohi Старыя Дарогi (Belarusian) Старые Дороги (Russian)
- Town
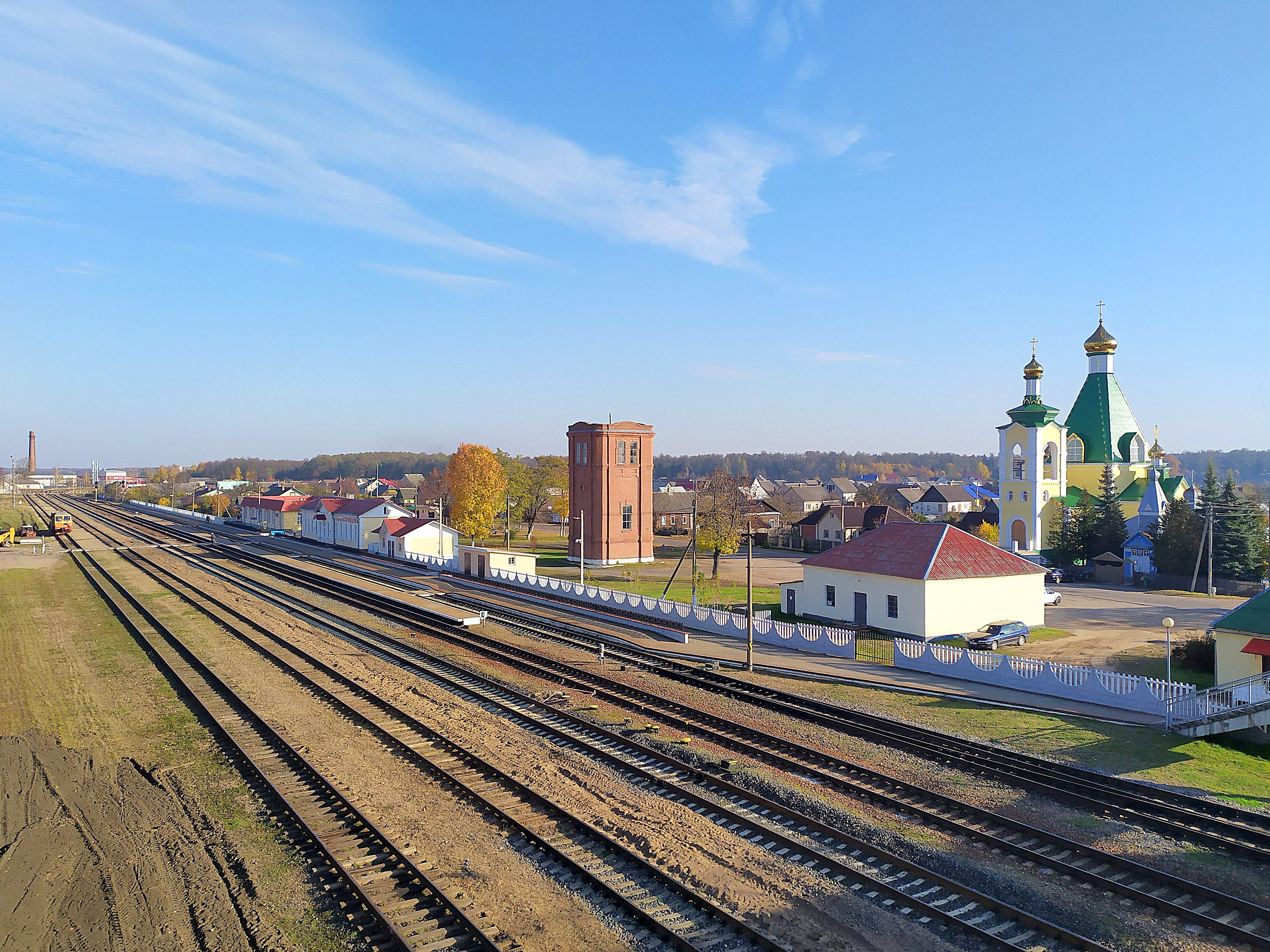
- Railway station, water tower and Saint Nicholas church

- Flag Coat of arms

- Location within Belarus
- Coordinates: 53°02′22″N 28°15′54″E
- Country: Belarus
- Region: Minsk Region
- District: Staryya Darohi District

Population (2026)
  - Total: 10,683
- Time zone: UTC+3 (MSK)
- Postal code: 222910
- Area code: +375 1792
- License plate: 5

Staryya Darohi (Belarusian: Старыя Дарогi, romanized: Staryja Darohi; Russian: Старые Дороги, romanized: Staryye Dorogi) is a town in Minsk Region, Belarus. It serves as the administrative center of Staryya Darohi District. It is located 107 kilometres (66 mi) south-southeast of the capital Minsk. As of 2026, it has a population of 10,683.

== History ==
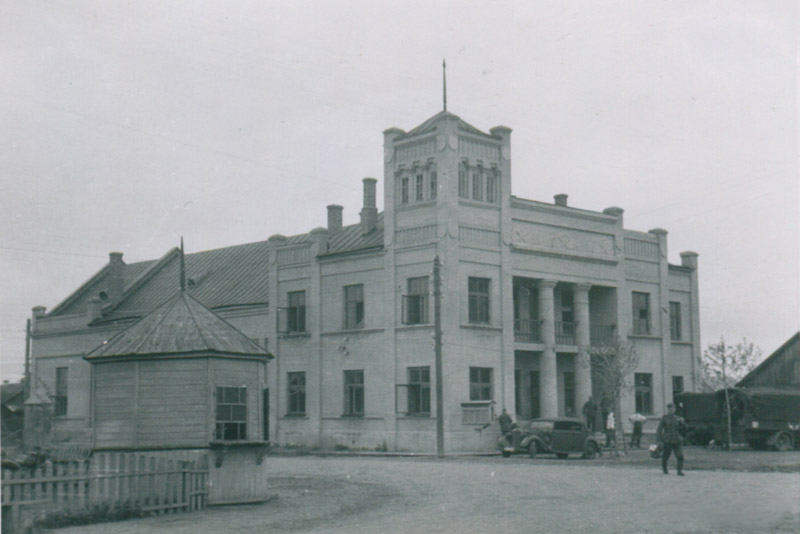
Palace of Culture in 1941

It is a former village of the Radziwiłł family.

In 1939, there were 1,085 Jews living there, making up 28.6% of the total population. There were two synagogues and several Jewish schools.

During World War II, in 1941, Jews were imprisoned in a closed ghetto by Germans, some Jews managed to escape before on their own or by train. There was a fenced and guarded ghetto on Kirov street where there was a Jewish school and several houses. A group of Jews was forced to swim into the river and shot by the Germans when they were in the water, but little is known about this massacre. On January 19, 1942, the Jews were murdered in a mass execution at a place known as Kacharka. They were massacred by an SS detachment, assisted by local police. Other categories of victims like prisoners of war were also shot at this location.

Immediately after World War II, a displaced persons camp called the Red House was located outside the village. Primo Levi describes in his book The Truce during a short period when around 1,400 displaced persons from across Europe lived there with the Red Army.

== Sports ==
FC Starye Dorogi is based in the town.

== Bibliography ==
- Megargee, Geoffrey P.; Dean, Martin (4 May 2012). The United States Holocaust Memorial Museum Encyclopedia of Camps and Ghettos, 1933 –1945: Volume II: Ghettos in German-Occupied Eastern Europe. Indiana University Press. ISBN 978-0-253-00202-0.
