= Mogilev district =

District of Mogilev region, Belarus

Coordinates: 53°55′N 30°21′E

Mogilev district Магілёўскі раён (Belarusian) Могилёвский район (Russian)
- District
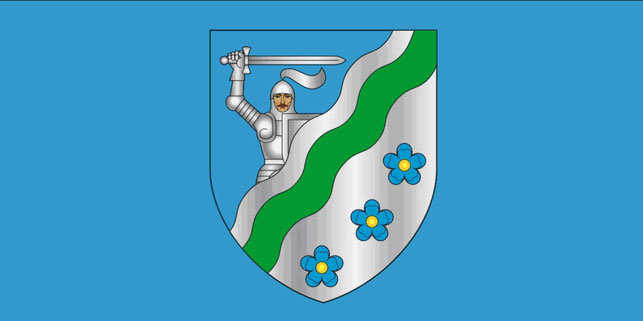
- Flag Coat of arms

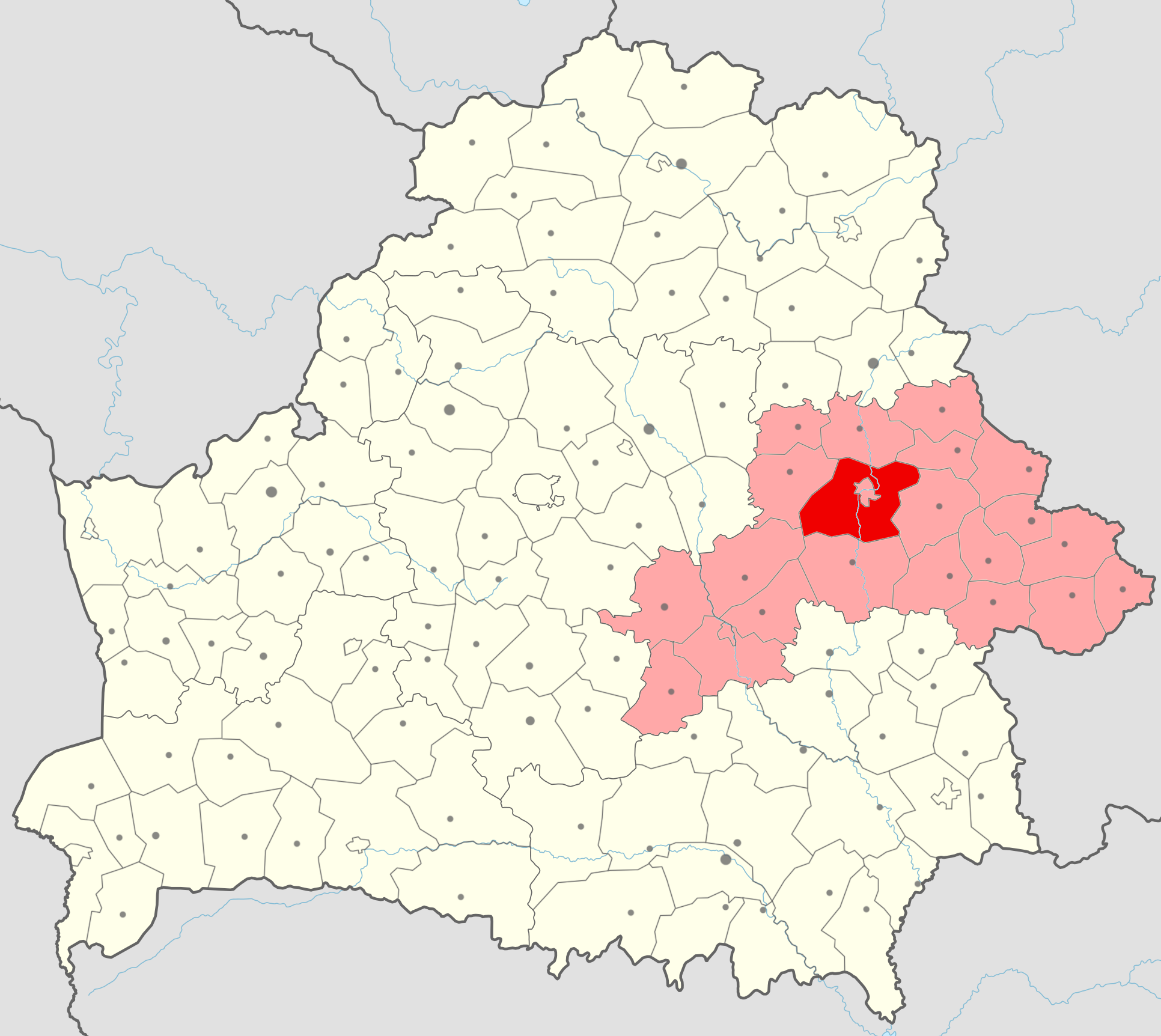
- Country: Belarus
- Region: Mogilev region
- Administrative center: Mogilev

Area
  - Total: 1,895.40 km^{2} (731.82 sq mi)

Population (2023)
  - Total: 40,165
  - Density: 21.191/km^{2} (54.884/sq mi)
- Time zone: UTC+3 (MSK)

Mogilev district or Mahilioŭ district (Belarusian: Магілёўскі раён; Russian: Могилёвский район, romanized: Mogilyovsky rayon) is a district (raion) of Mogilev region in Belarus. The administrative center of the district is the city of Mogilev, which is administratively separated from the district.

== Demographics ==
As of 2009, the district's population was 43,166.
