= Byelaazyorsk =

Town in Brest Region, Belarus

Byelaazyorsk Белаазёрск (Belarusian) Белоозёрск (Russian)
- Town
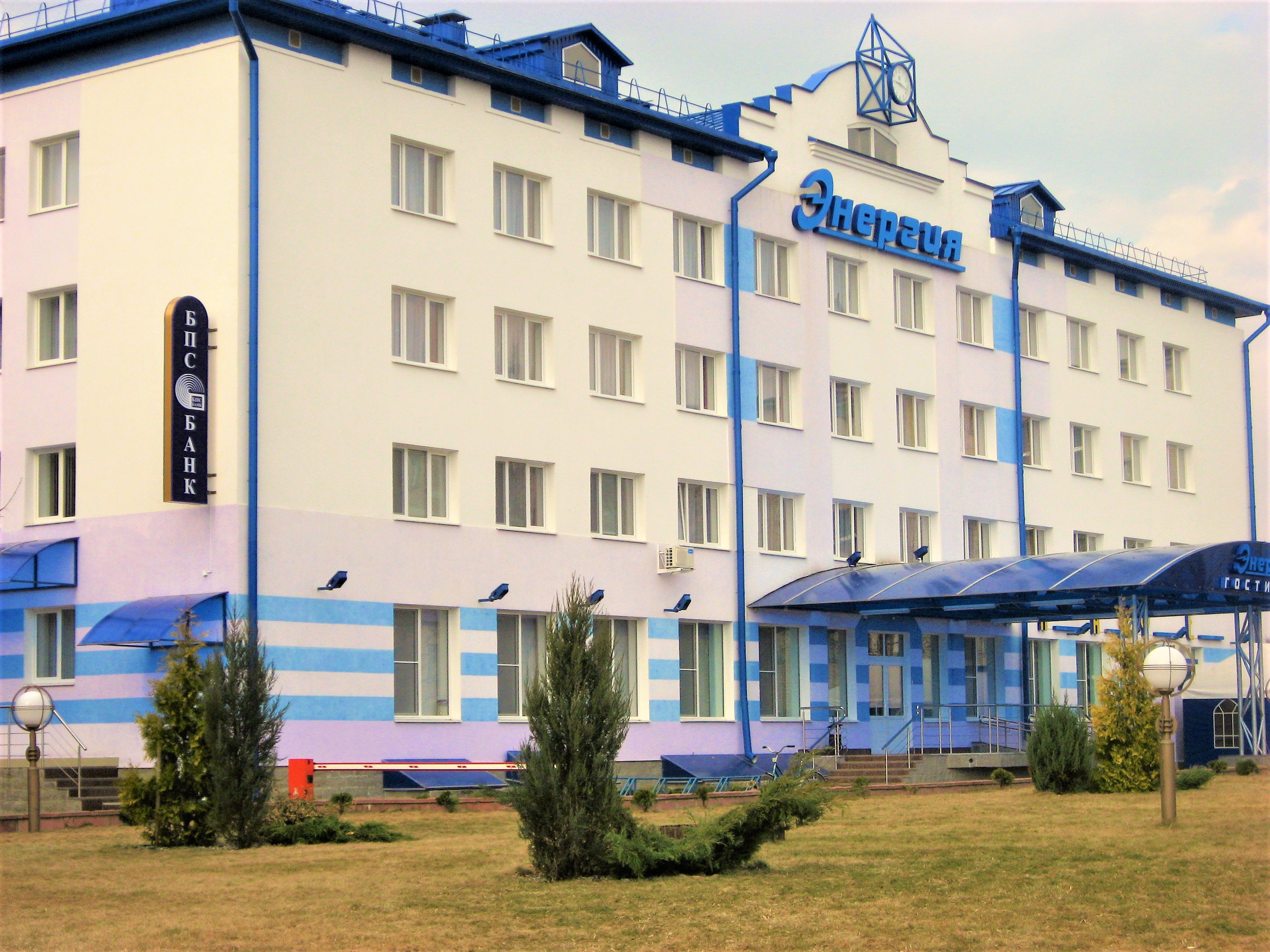

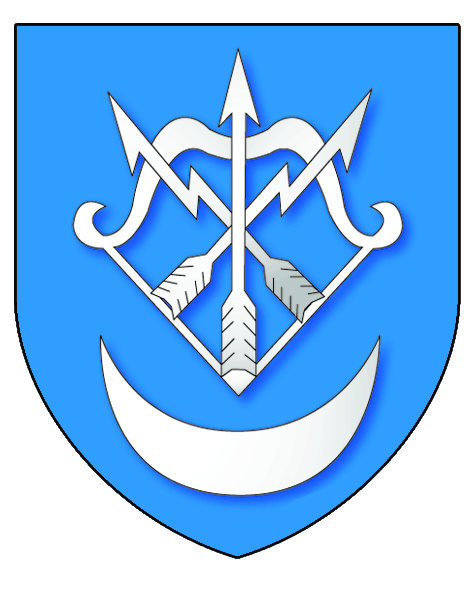
- Coat of arms

- Location in Belarus
- Coordinates: 52°27′N 25°10′E
- Country: Belarus
- Region: Brest Region
- District: Byaroza District
- Founded: 1958

Population (2026)
  - Total: 10,747
- Time zone: UTC+3 (MSK)
- Postal code: 225205, 225215
- Area code: +375 1643
- License plate: 1

Byelaazyorsk (Belarusian: Белаазёрск, romanized: Bielaaziorsk, local pronunciation: [bʲiloˌoˈzʲɔrs⁽ʲ⁾k]) or Beloozersk (Russian: Белоозёрск, romanized: Beloozyorsk) is a town in Byaroza District, Brest Region, Belarus. As of 2026, it has a population of 10,747.
