= FC Bereza-2010 =

- Full name: Football Club Bereza-2010
- Founded: 1989
- Dissolved: 2016
- Ground: DYuSSh-1 Stadium, Byaroza
- Capacity: 4,000
- League: Belarusian First League
- 2015: 11th
Home colours	Away colours

FC Bereza-2010 (or Byaroza-2010) was a Belarusian football club based in Byaroza, Brest Oblast.

== History ==
The team was founded in 1989 as Stroitel Bereza. They played in the Belarusian SSR league from 1989 to 1991. In 1992, they joined the newly created Belarusian Second League. After a successful 1995 season they were promoted to the First League. Before the start of the 1997 season they were renamed to FC Bereza.

In between the 1998 and 1999 seasons Bereza merged with the local Second League club from the same town and adopted their name Keramik Bereza, while maintaining their own history. In 2002, they reverted the name back to FC Bereza. After an unsuccessful 2006 season Bereza were relegated back to the Second League.

== Current status ==
In 2010, the club, struggling with financial problems, came to an agreement with Dinamo Minsk to become their feeder team and was renamed to Bereza-2010. Manned mostly with the players from the Dinamo football academy, the club rejoined the Second League. In 2011, they finished 2nd in the Second League and were promoted to the First League after 5 years of absence.

In early 2016 the club was dissolved.
