= FC Dinamo-Juni Minsk =

Dinamo-Juni Minsk
- Full name: FC Dinamo-Juni Minsk
- Founded: 1993
- Dissolved: 2004
- Ground: Kamvolschik Stadium, Minsk
- League: Belarusian First League
- 2004: 16th

Dinamo-Juni Minsk was a Belarusian football club based in Minsk.

== History ==
The club was founded in 1993 as an outfit for Dinamo Minsk Academy graduates, and served as the team's farm club. After two seasons in Belarusian Second League they were promoted to the First League in 1995. After finishing in relegation zone in 2004, the club was folded.

=== Performance by season ===
Season	League	Pos.	Pl.	W	D	L	GS	GA	P	Cup	Notes	Manager
1993–94	3D	9	34	13	10	11	50	41	36			
1994–95	3D – A	2	22	14	7	1	54	11	35	Last 16	Won Promotion Playoffs	
1995	2D	12	14	4	2	8	12	22	14			
1996	2D	6	24	9	7	8	27	26	34	Last 16		
1997	2D	9	30	12	7	11	45	42	43	Last 16		
1998	2D	4	30	17	5	8	61	36	56	Last 32		
1999	2D	3	30	16	8	6	50	36	56	Last 32		
2000	2D	11	30	11	5	14	44	47	38			
2001	2D	13	28	6	7	15	19	39	25			
2002	2D	9	30	11	1	18	40	47	34			
2003	2D	12	30	7	6	17	27	60	27			
2004	2D	16	30	6	3	21	27	55	21		Relegated	
