= FC Vitebsk =

Vitebsk
- Full name: Football Club Vitebsk
- Founded: 1960; 66 years ago
- Ground: Vitebsky Central Sport Complex, Vitebsk, Belarus
- Capacity: 8,144
- Manager: Sergei Gurenko
- League: Belarusian Premier League
- 2025: 12th of 16
- Website: https://fc.vitebsk.by/
Home colours	Away colours

FC Vitebsk (Belarusian: ФК Віцебск, romanized: FK Viciebsk, Russian: ФК Витебск) is a Belarusian professional football club based in Vitebsk. The club plays in the Belarusian Premier League, the top division in Belarusian football. Their home stadium is Vitebsky Central Sport Complex.

== History ==
The club was founded in 1960 as Krasnoye Znamya Vitebsk (Red Flag Vitebsk). They began playing in Soviet Class B (second-tier league) the same year. After three seasons, they relegated to the third tier. Vitebsk team would spend almost all of their subsequent Soviet-era seasons playing at the third level (Soviet Second League), with the exception of 1970 and 1990, when the team dropped to 4th level. The club went through several name changes. In 1963, they were renamed Dvina Vitebsk after local river. In 1985, the club was renamed Vityaz Vitebsk and in 1989 it was renamed KIM Vitebsk (both names relate to local industry companies).

In 1992 KIM joined Belarusian Premier League. During the 90s KIM (later renamed Dvina Vitebsk again in 1994 and Lokomotiv-96 Vitebsk in 1996) was one of the league top teams. They were league runners-up in 1992–93 and 1994–95, finished third in 1993–94 and 1997 and also won the Belarusian Cup in 1998. Since the 2000s, the club's results declined. They have relegated to the First League several times and promoted back and were never able to fight the title in later years. In 2003, they shortened their name to Lokomotiv Vitebsk and in 2006 to the current version, FC Vitebsk.

=== Name changes ===
- 1960: founded as Krasnoye Znamya Vitebsk
- 1963: renamed Dvina Vitebsk
- 1985: renamed Vityaz Vitebsk
- 1989: renamed KIM Vitebsk
- 1994: renamed Dvina Vitebsk
- 1996: renamed Lokomotiv-96 Vitebsk
- 2003: renamed Lokomotiv Vitebsk
- 2006: renamed Vitebsk

== Honours ==
- Belarusian Premier League
  - Runners-up (2): 1992–93, 1994–95
  - 3rd place (2): 1993–94, 1997
- Belarusian Cup
  - Winners (1): 1998
  - Runners-up (1): 2018–19

== Current squad ==
As of 25 August 2026

Note: Flags indicate national team as defined under FIFA eligibility rules; some limited exceptions apply. Players may hold more than one non-FIFA nationality.

No.	Pos.	Nation	Player
1	GK	BLR	Ivan Novichkov
4	DF	BLR	Viktor Karzhitsky
6	DF	BLR	Kiryl Radzivonaw
7	MF	BLR	Roman Lisovsky
8	FW	BLR	Aleksandr Anufriyev
9	MF	BLR	Ruslan Teverov
10	MF	UKR	Yevhen Protasov
11	MF	BLR	Artyom Gurenko
14	FW	BLR	Zakhar Chervyakov
15	DF	BLR	Maksim Kuntsevich
17	MF	BLR	Yevgeniy Novykh
18	FW	BLR	Vladlen Anikeyev
19	FW	BLR	Nikita Vekhtev
20	MF	BLR	Yevgeny Krasnov

No.	Pos.	Nation	Player
21	FW	BLR	Aleksandr Burnos
22	DF	RUS	Semyon Yegorov
23	FW	BLR	Vladislav Pulkach
24	DF	BLR	Ivan Kravchenko
26	MF	BLR	Sergey Tikhonovsky
30	MF	RUS	Mikhail Bashilov
50	GK	RUS	Nikita Goylo (on loan from Zenit)
66	FW	BLR	Aleksandr Radin
67	FW	BLR	Gleb Minkevich
77	FW	RUS	Roman Minayev
86	FW	CRO	Marin Žgomba
88	MF	BLR	Daniil Pesnyak
91	DF	BLR	Pavel Nazarenko

== League and cup history ==
=== Soviet Union era ===
Season	Level	Pos	Pld	W	D	L	Goals	Points	Domestic Cup	Notes
1960	2nd	12	30	7	7	16	26–44	21		
1961	2nd	8	30	12	8	10	44–46	32	Round of 128	
1962	2nd	15	32	9	6	17	24–40	24	Round of 64	Relegated
1963	3rd	10	30	11	5	14	31–37	27	Round of 1024	
1964	3rd	14	30	8	8	14	16–29	24	Round of 2048	Zone 1 (Ukraine)
1965	3rd	6	30	8	14	8	29–28	30	Round of 1024	
1966	3rd	17	32	5	7	20	14–44	17	Round of 4096	
1967	3rd	17	34	7	10	17	17–43	24	Round of 4096	
1968	3rd	7	38	19	8	11	39–31	46	Round of 4096	
1969	3rd	14	32	9	10	13	30–34	28	Round of 16^{1}	Relegated^{2}
1970	4th	11	32	10	8	14	27–36	28		Promoted^{3}
1971	3rd	16	38	7	14	17	21–42	35		
1972	3rd	15	38	12	8	18	31–35	44		
1973	3rd	13	32	4	16	12	18–36	19^{4}		
1974	3rd	20	40	6	13	21	20–47	25		
1975	3rd	16	34	6	7	21	20–57	19		
1976	3rd	15	38	11	11	16	42–38	33		
1977	3rd	14	40	11	12	17	29–38	34		
1978	3rd	15	46	13	15	18	43–43	41		
1979	3rd	12	46	15	21	10	49–38	51		
1980	3rd	9	32	5	10	17	23–47	20		
1981	3rd	9	40	8	12	20	38–60	28		
1982	3rd	16	30	5	6	19	13–44	16		
1983	3rd	10	32	9	11	12	28–42	29		
1984	3rd	18	34	7	6	21	27–60	20		
1985	3rd	14	30	7	6	17	32–49	20		
1986	3rd	16	30	2	6	22	19–57	10		
1987	3rd	17	34	6	8	20	28–51	20		
1988	3rd	17	34	3	12	19	16–57	18		
1989	3rd	13	42	17	8	17	41–47	42		Relegated^{5}
1990	4th	2	32	20	6	6	59–31	46		Promoted
1991	3rd	20	42	11	8	23	43–55	30		

- ^{1} Separate cup for 3rd level teams, different for each zone.
- ^{2} Relegated due to Class B (the league where Dvina was playing) changing its status from 3rd to 4th level in 1970, and the top two levels were reorganized into three with fewer teams.
- ^{3} Promoted due to 3rd level (Class A Second Group, renamed to Second League since next season) expansion from 3 to 6 territorial zones (from 66 to 124 teams) in 1971 and dismissal of 4th level.
- ^{4} In 1973 every draw was followed by a penalty shoot-out, with a winner gaining 1 point and loser gaining 0.
- ^{5} Despite finishing 13th from the 22 teams in 1989, KIM relegated as the Second League (3rd level) was reduced from 9 zones (195 teams) to 3 zones (66 teams) and the Second Lower League with 9 zones was introduced as a 4th level.

=== Belarus era ===
Season	Level	Pos	Pld	W	D	L	Goals	Points	Domestic Cup	Notes
1992	1st	6	15	7	3	5	21–14	17	Round of 16	
1992–93	1st	2	32	18	11	3	55–21	47	Semifinals	
1993–94	1st	3	30	17	9	4	32–14	43	Round of 16	
1994–95	1st	2	30	16	13	1	46–15	45	Round of 32	
1995	1st	7	15	5	5	5	12–12	20	Round of 32	
1996	1st	5	30	13	10	7	48–27	49	Round of 32	
1997	1st	3	30	18	5	7	46–30	59	Quarterfinals	
1998	1st	4	28	14	6	8	35–24	48	Winners	
1999	1st	11	30	9	7	14	40–45	34	Round of 16	
2000	1st	11	30	8	7	15	34–50	31	Quarterfinals	
2001	1st	12	26	4	7	15	18–51	19	Round of 16	
2002	1st	14	26	3	0	23	20–77	9	Round of 32	Relegated
2003	2nd	1	31^{1}	23	4	4	59–22	73	Quarterfinals	Promoted
2004	1st	15	31^{2}	8	3	20	35–58	27	Quarterfinals	Relegated
2005	2nd	2	30	21	7	2	76–23	70	Round of 32	Promoted
2006	1st	6	26	9	11	6	21–18	38	Round of 32	
2007	1st	8	26	9	8	9	25–28	35	Round of 16	
2008	1st	5	30	14	9	7	39–26	51	Round of 16	
2009	1st	10	26	10	2	14	26–37	32	Quarterfinals	
2010	1st	9	33	7	11	15	31–52	32	Round of 32	
2011	1st	11	33	8	8	17	29–46	32	Round of 16	Relegated^{3}
2012	2nd	3	28	19	2	7	57–30	59	Round of 32	
2013	2nd	3	30	16	7	7	40–29	55	Round of 32	
2014	2nd	3	30	15	5	10	44–30	50	Round of 32	Promoted^{4}
2015	1st	13	26	4	9	13	21–47	21	Round of 8	
2016	1st	6	30	12	6	12	30–26	42	Round of 8	
2017	1st	8	30	12	7	11	35–38	43	Round of 16	
2018	1st	4	30	19	5	6	47–20	62	Round of 16	
2019	1st	13	30	8	7	15	24–39	31	Runners-up	
2020	1st	12	30	8	12	10	30–38	36	Round of 16	
2021	1st	7	30	9	10	11	37–41	37	Quarter-finals	
2022	1st						–		Semi-finals	

- ^{1} Including additional game (2–1 win) against MTZ-RIPO Minsk for the 1st place as both teams finished with equal points.
- ^{2} Including additional game (1–4 loss) against MTZ-RIPO Minsk for the 14th place as both teams finished with equal points.
- ^{3} Lost relegation play-off to Partizan Minsk (0–2 away, 2–1 home)
- ^{4} Won promotion play-off against Dnepr Mogilev (2–0 home, 1–1 away)

== European record ==
Vitebsk played in European Cups under their former name Lokomotiv-96.

Season	Competition	Round		Club	1st leg	2nd leg
1998–99	UEFA Cup Winners' Cup	QR	(Bulgaria)	Levski Sofia	1–8 (A)	1–1 (H)
1999	UEFA Intertoto Cup	1R	(Croatia)	Varteks	1–2 (H)	2–2 (A)
2019–20	UEFA Europa League	1QR	(Finland)	KuPS	0–2 (A)	1–1 (H)

== Managers ==
- (Soviet Union) Pyotr Vasilevsky (1989–91)
- (Belarus) Georgy Kondratyev (2003–04)
- (Russia) Andrey Chernyshov (2006–07)
- (Belarus) Yury Konoplev (2007–08)
- (Belarus) Alyaksandr Khatskevich (2008–09)
- (Belarus) Yury Konoplev (2009–10)
- (Belarus) Sergei Borovsky (2010–11)
- (Belarus) Yury Konoplev (2012–14)
- (Belarus) Sergey Vekhtev (2014–15)
- (Belarus) Sergey Yasinsky (2015–20)

== See also ==
- FC Vitebsk-2
