= Belarusian First League =

- Founded: 1992; 34 years ago
- Country: Belarus
- Confederation: UEFA
- Number of clubs: 18
- Level on pyramid: 2
- Promotion to: Belarusian Premier League
- Relegation to: Belarusian Second League
- Domestic cup: Belarusian Cup
- Current champions: Baranovichi (1st title) (2025)
- Website: abff.by
- Current: 2026 Belarusian First League

The Belarusian First League (Belarusian: Першая ліга чэмпіянату Беларусі па футболе, romanized: Pershaya liha chempiyanatu Byelarusi pa futbole) is the second tier of professional football in Belarus. It was created in 1992, following the Belarusian independence.

== History and format ==
The typical format of the league involves 16 clubs playing a double round-robin tournament over 30 matchdays (with the exception of shortened 1992 and 1995 seasons, which were a single round-robin tournaments). On several occasions the number of participating teams was smaller (15 or 14), due to last minute withdrawals and no teams available for replacement. In most of the seasons, two best teams are getting promoted to Belarusian Premier League, while two worst teams are relegated to the Belarusian Second League.

== First League in 2025 ==
In 2025, the Belarusian First League will consist of the following 18 teams:

Team	Location	Position in 2024
Dnepr Mogilev	Mogilev	14 (Premier League)
Niva Dolbizno	Dolbizno	3
Belshina Bobruisk	Bobruisk	4
Volna Pinsk	Pinsk	5
Lida	Lida	6
Dinamo-2 Minsk	Minsk	7
BATE-2 Borisov	Borisov	8
Bumprom Gomel	Gomel	9
Orsha	Orsha	10
Ostrovets	Ostrovets	11
Lokomotiv Gomel	Gomel	12
Baranovichi	Baranovichi	13
ABFF U-19	Minsk	14
Slonim-2017	Slonim	16
Minsk-2	Minsk	1 (Second League)
Unixlabs Minsk	Minsk	4 (Second League)
Gomel-2	Gomel	5 (Second League)
Osipovichi	Osipovichi	9 (Second League)

== Winners and promoted teams ==
Teams in bold were promoted to Premier League at the end of the season.

Season	Winner	Runner-up	Third place
1992	Dinamo-2 Minsk	Shinnik Bobruisk	Kommunalnik Pinsk
1992–93	Shinnik Bobruisk	Polesye Mozyr	Selmash Mogilev
1993–94	Obuvschik Lida	Polesye Mozyr	Kommunalnik Pinsk
1994–95	MPKC Mozyr	**Ataka-Aura Minsk**	Kommunalnik Pinsk
1995	Naftan-Devon Novopolotsk	Kommunalnik Pinsk^{1}	Fomalgaut Borisov
1996	Transmash Mogilev	**Kommunalnik Slonim**	Khimik Svetlogorsk
1997	Gomel	**BATE Borisov**	Lida
1998	Lida	**Svisloch-Krovlya Osipovichi**	Pinsk-900
1999	Kommunalnik Slonim	**Vedrich-97 Rechitsa**	Dinamo-Yuni Minsk
2000	Molodechno	Luninets	Neman Mosty
2001	Torpedo Zhodino	**Zvezda-VA-BGU Minsk**	Darida Minsk Raion
2002	Darida Minsk Raion	**Naftan Novopolotsk**	**Lokomotiv Minsk**
2003	Lokomotiv Vitebsk	**MTZ-RIPO Minsk**	Smorgon
2004	Lokomotiv Minsk	Vedrich-97 Rechitsa^{2}	Smorgon
2005	Belshina Bobruisk	**Lokomotiv Vitebsk**	Smorgon
2006	Minsk	**Smorgon**	Khimik Svetlogorsk
2007	Savit Mogilev	**Granit Mikashevichi**	**Lokomotiv Minsk**
2008	Minsk	Khimik Svetlogorsk	Belshina Bobruisk
2009	Belshina Bobruisk	Volna Pinsk	DSK Gomel
2010	Gomel	SKVICH Minsk^{1}	DSK Gomel
2011	Slavia Mozyr	Partizan Minsk^{3}	Gorodeya
2012	Dnepr Mogilev	Gorodeya^{1}	Vitebsk
2013	Slutsk	Gorodeya^{1}	Vitebsk
2014	Granit Mikashevichi	**Slavia Mozyr**	**Vitebsk**
2015	Isloch Minsk Raion	**Gorodeya**	**Krumkachy Minsk**
2016	Gomel	**Dnepr Mogilev**	Gomelzheldortrans
2017	Luch Minsk	**Smolevichi-STI**	**Torpedo Minsk**
2018	Slavia Mozyr	**Energetik-BGU Minsk**	Belshina Bobruisk
2019	Belshina Bobruisk	**Smolevichi**	**Rukh Brest**
2020	Sputnik Rechitsa	**Gomel**	Krumkachy Minsk (**Smorgon**^{4})
2021	Arsenal Dzerzhinsk	**Belshina Bobruisk**	**Dnepr Mogilev**
2022	Naftan	**Smorgon**	**Rogachev**
2023	Arsenal Dzerzhinsk	**Dnepr Mogilev**	**Vitebsk**
2024	Molodechno	**Maxline Vitebsk**	**Niva Dolbizno**
2025	Baranovichi	**Dnepr Mogilev**	**Lokomotiv Gomel**
2026			

- ^{1} Team lost promotion/relegation play-off
- ^{2} Team was eligible for promotion but was denied Premier League license
- ^{3} Team won promotion/relegation play-off but disbanded after the season
- ^{4} Smorgon promoted from the 6th place
