= FC Starye Dorogi =

Starye Dorogi
- Full name: FC Starye Dorogi
- Founded: 1986
- Ground: Stroitel Stadium, Starye Dorogi
- Capacity: 1,000
- League: Minsk Oblast League (Amateur)

FC Starye Dorogi is a Belarusian football club based in Staryya Darohi (Starye Dorogi), Minsk Oblast.

== History ==
FC Starye Dorogi was formed in 1986 as Vympel Starye Dorogi and started playing in Belarusian SSR Top League the same year. In 1987, the team was renamed to Stroitel Starye Dorogi.

Since 1992, Stroitel was playing in the Belarusian Premier League. They spent there three seasons until the relegation in 1994. Since then, the club's results were getting progressively worse. Between 1994 and 1997, Stroitel was playing in the Belarusian First League. In 1996, they lost all 24 games and finished in last, 13th place, but were saved from relegation due to the First League expansion to 16 teams. In 1997, they again finished last and got relegated to the Second League.

Stroitel played in the Second league until 2000. Since 2000, they changed their name to FC Starye Dorogi, and since 2001, they play on amateur level in Minsk Oblast Top League, which is a part of KFK (4th level of Belarusian league system).

=== Name changes ===
- 1986: formed as Vympel Starye Dorogi
- 1987: renamed to Stroitel Starye Dorogi
- 2000: renamed to Starye Dorogi

== League and Cup history ==
Season	Level	Pos	Pld	W	D	L	Goals	Points	Domestic Cup	Notes
1992	1st	14	15	4	2	9	14–22	10	Quarter-finals	
1992–93	1st	14	32	7	9	16	21–42	23	Round of 16	
1993–94	1st	16	30	3	7	20	13–53	13	Quarter-finals	Relegated
1994–95	2nd	6	30	14	6	10	44–32	34	Quarter-finals	
1995	2nd	13	14	3	3	8	12–26	12	Round of 32	
1996	2nd	13^{1}	24	0	0	24	6–97	0	Round of 32	
1997	2nd	16	30	0	5	25	14–81	5	Round of 32	Relegated
1998	3rd	12	30	8	5	17	27–48	29	Round of 32	
1999	3rd	9	23^{2}	7	3	13	23–43	24		
2000	3rd	6	22	10	2	10	30–32	32		

- ^{1} Finished last but saved from relegation due to league expansion from 13 to 16 teams.
- ^{2} Last round match cancelled and never replayed.
