= FC Neman Grodno =

Belarusian football club

Neman Grodno
- Full name: Football Club Neman Grodno
- Founded: 1964; 62 years ago
- Ground: Neman Stadium, Grodno
- Capacity: 8,479
- Chairman: Ivan Vorsovich
- Head coach: Igor Kovalevich
- League: Belarusian Premier League
- 2025: Belarusian Premier League, 8th of 16
- Website: www.fcneman.by
Home colours	Away colours

FC Neman Grodno or FK Nyoman Hrodna (Belarusian: ФК Нёман Гродна; Russian: ФК Неман Гродно) is a Belarusian professional football club based in the city of Grodno. It is named after the Neman River and founded in 1964. Since 1992, the team has participated in the highest division of Belarusian football league system.

== History ==
Since 1964, the team was playing in the third tier of the Soviet football system almost constantly, excluding two seasons (1968 and 1969) spent in the second tier. Since 1992, Neman plays in the Belarusian Premier League. In 1993, they won the Belarusian Cup. The most successful years for the team were in the early 2000s, when they finished fourth twice in a row before finishing second in 2002 after losing the first place play-off against BATE Borisov.

=== Name changes ===
- 1964: founded as Neman Grodno
- 1973: renamed to Khimik Grodno
- 1993: renamed to Neman Grodno
- 1999: renamed to Neman-Belcard Grodno
- 2002: renamed to Neman Grodno

== Honours ==
- Belarusian Premier League
  - Runners-up (3): 2002, 2023, 2024
- Belarusian Cup
  - Winners (3): 1993, 2024, 2025
  - Runners-up (2): 2011, 2014
- Belarusian Supercup
  - Winners (1): 2026

== Current squad ==
As of 25 August, 2026

Note: Flags indicate national team as defined under FIFA eligibility rules; some limited exceptions apply. Players may hold more than one non-FIFA nationality.

No.	Pos.	Nation	Player
1	GK	BLR	Artur Maliyevsky
2	DF	BLR	Vladimir Tonkevich
4	DF	RUS	Andrei Vasilyev
6	MF	BLR	Artur Nazarenko
7	FW	SRB	Andrija Ratković
8	DF	UKR	Yuriy Pantya
9	MF	BLR	Sergey Pushnyakov
10	MF	BLR	Ruslan Lisakovich (on loan from Maxline Vitebsk)
14	DF	CIV	Sherif Jimoh
15	MF	BLR	Oleg Yevdokimov
16	GK	BLR	Nikita Matysyuk
17	FW	BLR	Anton Suchkow
18	FW	BLR	Maksim Kravtsov
19	MF	BLR	Aleksey Dayneko
20	DF	BLR	Ivan Sadownichy

No.	Pos.	Nation	Player
22	DF	BLR	Ilya Kirko
23	MF	LBR	Tito Yormie Jr.
24	MF	BLR	Andrey Yakimov
30	MF	BLR	Aliaksandr Yednach
32	MF	BLR	Yury Pavlyukovets
33	MF	MDA	Dan Spătaru
35	GK	BLR	Kirill Veydyger
37	FW	RUS	Dmitry Radikovsky (on loan from Lokomotiv Moscow)
47	MF	BLR	Mikhail Kazlow
50	DF	BLR	Aleksey Shalashnikov
55	MF	BLR	Dzmitry Girs
59	FW	BLR	Artyom Devyaten
88	MF	BLR	Pavel Savitsky

=== Out on loan ===
Note: Flags indicate national team as defined under FIFA eligibility rules; some limited exceptions apply. Players may hold more than one non-FIFA nationality.

No.	Pos.	Nation	Player
22	GK	BLR	Nikita Robak (at Slutsk)
3	DF	BLR	Maksim Autko (at Smorgon)
—	DF	BLR	Maksim Katsynel (at Lida)
44	MF	BLR	Ivan Kontsevoy (at Lida)
28	MF	BLR	Bogdan Levchenko (at Molodechno)

No.	Pos.	Nation	Player
—	MF	BLR	Alfred Mazurich (at Lida)
31	MF	BLR	Timur Minets (at Osipovichi)
—	MF	BLR	Oleg Petrovsky (at Osipovichi)
—	MF	BLR	Marat Vasilkevich (at Osipovichi)
—	FW	BLR	Sergey Zhurnevich (at Lida)

== League and Cup history ==
=== Soviet Union ===
Season	Level	Pos	Pld	W	D	L	Goals	Points	Domestic Cup	Notes
1964	3rd	16	30	6	6	18	16–60	18	Round of 2048	
1965	3rd	11	30	9	7	14	27–34	25	Round of 1024	
1966	3rd	4	32	15	10	7	38–15	40		
1966	3rd	3	3	1	1	1	3–3	3		Final round^{1}
1967	3rd	2	34	15	12	7	32–20	42	Round of 4096	
1967	3rd	1	3	3	0	0	9–0	6	Round of 4096	Semi-final round^{2}
1967	3rd	1	1	1	0	0	3–0	2	Round of 4096	Final round; Promoted
1968	2nd	19	40	6	17	17	20–53	29	Round of 256	
1969	2nd	14	40	7	23	10	27–27	37	Round of 256	
1969	2nd	2	2	0	2	0	2–2	2	Round of 256	Promotion/relegation play-off^{3}
1970	3rd	18	42	11	13	18	27–48	35	Round of 256	
1971	3rd	12	38	11	12	15	28–36	45		
1972	3rd	18	38	10	10	18	24–45	40		
1973	3rd	14	32	6	11	15	24–42	19^{4}		
1974	3rd	21	40	3	9	28	21–71	15		
1975	3rd	18	34	5	6	23	22–48	16		
1976	3rd	9	38	15	8	15	49–60	38		
1977	3rd	6	40	17	12	11	45–36	46		
1978	3rd	13	46	14	16	16	42–54	44		
1979	3rd	7	46	22	13	11	56–33	57		
1980	3rd	1	32	18	8	6	42–23	44		
1980	3rd	2	4	1	3	0	5–4	5		Final round^{5}
1981	3rd	4	38	14	13	11	48–44	41	Group stage	
1982	3rd	2	30	17	6	7	43–23	40		
1983	3rd	3	32	15	11	6	35–19	41		
1984	3rd	5	34	16	7	11	51–42	39		
1985	3rd	4	30	15	6	9	43–27	36		
1986	3rd	6	30	14	7	9	37–30	35		
1987	3rd	10	34	12	6	16	33–39	30	Round of 16	
1988	3rd	5	34	18	10	6	48–31	46		
1989	3rd	10	42	18	8	16	46–41	44		
1990	3rd	15	42	16	6	20	46–52	38	Round of 64	
1991	3rd	22	42	7	9	26	32–55	23		
1992									Round of 64	

- ^{1} Advanced to the final round for one promotion spot as the best-placed team from Belarusian SSR.
- ^{2} Advanced to the semi-final round of promotion tournament (for one spot) as one of top 8 teams not from Russian, Ukrainian, Kazakh or Central Asian SSR.
- ^{3} As the worst-placed team from the Belarusian SSR, Neman had to play promotion/relegation play-off against the best-placed Belarusian team from the 3rd level.
- ^{4} In 1973, every draw was followed by a penalty shoot-out, with a winner gaining 1 point and loser gaining 0.
- ^{5} Advanced to the final round for one promotion spot as winners of their zone.

=== Belarus ===
Season	Level	Pos	Pld	W	D	L	Goals	Points	Domestic Cup	Notes
1992	1st	5	15	9	0	6	21–17	18	Round of 16	
1992–93	1st	4	32	18	9	5	39–27	45	Winners	UEFA Cup Winners' Cup
1993–94	1st	11	30	8	8	16	29–41	24	Round of 32	
1994–95	1st	7	30	10	11	9	26–27	31	Round of 16	
1995	1st	8	15	6	1	8	20–35	19	Round of 32	
1996	1st	13	30	7	8	15	25–48	29	Round of 32	
1997	1st	10	30	10	8	12	32–41	38	Round of 16	
1998	1st	10	28	8	7	13	27–44	31	Quarter-finals	
1999	1st	9	30	10	7	13	36–43	37	Quarter-finals	
2000	1st	4	30	17	6	7	56–29	57	Quarter-finals	
2001	1st	4	26	14	8	4	44–20	50	Round of 16	
2002	1st	2	27^{1}	17	5	5	47–21	56	Round of 16	UEFA Cup
2003	1st	7	30	10	9	11	24–35	39	Quarter-finals	
2004	1st	7	30	11	7	12	37–33	40	Quarter-finals	UEFA Intertoto Cup
2005	1st	12	26	7	3	16	20–50	24	Semi-finals	
2006	1st	10	26	8	6	12	24–30	30	Round of 16	
2007	1st	6	26	9	9	8	23–22	36	Semi-finals	
2008	1st	12	30	8	9	13	36–40	33	Round of 16	
2009	1st	7	26	11	4	11	23–31	37	Semi-finals	
2010	1st	10	33	7	10	16	27–42	31	Quarter-finals	
2011	1st	8	33	8	13	12	33–45	37	Runners-up	
2012	1st	5	30	10	11	9	43–36	41	Semi-finals	
2013	1st	4	32	13	8	11	34–30	47	Round of 16	
2014	1st	8	32	11	9	12	41–36	42	Runners-up	UEFA Europa League
2015	1st	8	26	8	8	10	21–32	32	Quarter-finals	
2016	1st	14	30	7	8	15	21–36	29	Round of 16	
2017	1st	6	30	14	7	9	42–32	49	Round of 16	
2018	1st	7	30	12	7	11	31–32	43	Semi-finals	
2019	1st	10	30	10	6	14	28–37	36	Round of 32	
2020	1st	5	30	16	5	9	41–29	53	Round of 32	
2021	1st	11	30	9	7	14	36–36	34	Quarter-finals	
2022	1st	9	30	9	13	8	39–36	40	Semi-finals	UEFA Conference League
2023	1st	2	28	19	5	4	60–22	62	Semi-finals	UEFA Conference League
2024	1st	2	30	20	5	5	45–19	65	Winners	UEFA Conference League
2025	1st	8	30	14	3	13	41–31	45	Winners	
2026	1st								Round of 32	

- ^{1} Including additional game (0–1 loss) against BATE for the first place.

== Neman in Europe ==
As of match played 28 August 2025

Competition	GP	W	D	L	GF	GA	±
UEFA Europa League / UEFA Cup	4	0	3	1	2	4	–2
UEFA Conference League	16	6	4	6	18	23	–5
UEFA Cup Winners Cup	2	1	0	1	2	6	–4
UEFA Intertoto Cup	2	0	1	1	0	1	–1
Total	24	7	8	9	22	34	–12

Season	Competition	Round	Opponent	Home	Away	Aggregate
1993–94	UEFA Cup Winners' Cup	QR	(Switzerland) Lugano	2–1	0–5	2–6
2003–04	UEFA Cup	QR	(Romania) Steaua București	1–1	0–0	1–1
2005	UEFA Intertoto Cup	1R	(Czech Republic) Tescoma Zlín	0–1	0–0	0–1
2014–15	UEFA Europa League	2Q	(Iceland) FH Hafnarfjörður	1–1	0–2	1–3
2023–24	UEFA Conference League	1Q	(Liechtenstein) Vaduz	1–1	2–1	3–2
2023–24	UEFA Conference League	2Q	(Malta) Balzan	2–0	0−0	2−0
2023–24	UEFA Conference League	3Q	(Slovenia) Celje	1–4	0–1	1–5
2024–25	UEFA Conference League	2Q	(Romania) CFR Cluj	0–5	0–0	0–5
2025–26	UEFA Conference League	1Q	(Armenia) Urartu	4–0	2–1	6–1
2025–26	UEFA Conference League	2Q	(Slovakia) Košice	1–1	3–2	4–3
2025–26	UEFA Conference League	3Q	(Faroe Islands) KÍ Klaksvík	2–0 (a.e.t.)	0–2	2–2 (5–4 p)
2025–26	UEFA Conference League	PO	(Spain) Rayo Vallecano	0–1	0–4	0–5

== Managers ==
- (Belarus) Vyacheslav Sivakov
- (Belarus) Valery Yanochkin (Sept 1, 1993 – April 1, 1995)
- (Belarus) Sergey Solodovnikov (Sept 1, 1997 – Feb 1, 1998), (May 1, 1998 – June 30, 2005)
- (Belarus) Vladimir Kurnev (Jan 1, 2006 – Dec 31, 2006)
- (Belarus) Liudas Rumbutis (Jan 1, 2007 – Dec 31, 2007)
- (Belarus) Vyacheslav Akshayev (Jan 4, 2008 – July 20, 2008)
- (Belarus) Oleg Radushko (July 21, 2008 – July 19, 2010)
- (Russia) Aleksandr Koreshkov (June 25, 2010 – Aug 11, 2011)
- (Belarus) Pyotr Kachuro (caretaker) (Aug 13, 2011 – Aug 15, 2011)
- (Belarus) Sergey Solodovnikov (Aug 16, 2011 – Apr 26, 2016)
- (Belarus) Oleg Kirenya (caretaker) (Apr 26, 2016 – Jun 16, 2016)
- (Belarus) Igor Kovalevich (Jun 17, 2016 –)
