= FC Lokomotiv Vitebsk (1986) =

Lokomotiv Vitebsk
- Full name: FC Lokomotiv Vitebsk
- Founded: 1986
- Dissolved: 2001
- Ground: Vitebsk, Belarus

FC Lokomotiv Vitebsk is a defunct Belarusian football club from Vitebsk.

== History ==
The club was formed in 1986 as SKB Vitebsk. During Soviet years the club played in Belarusian SSR league. In 1992 they were renamed to SKB-Lokomotiv Vitebsk and joined newly created Belarusian Premier League. In the summer of the same year, they updated the name to Lokomotiv Vitebsk.

In 1995, Lokomotiv relegated to the First League. After three seasons, they relegated again (to the Second League), and after the 2000 season, the club was dissolved. During 1996–2000, the club acted as a farm club of Lokomotiv-96 Vitebsk.

=== Name changes ===
- 1986: founded as SKB Vitebsk
- 1992: renamed to SKB-Lokomotiv Vitebsk
- 1992: renamed to Lokomotiv Vitebsk
- 2001: disbanded

== League and Cup history ==
Season	Level	Pos	Pld	W	D	L	Goals	Points	Domestic Cup	Notes
1992	1st	15	15	4	2	9	16–28	10	Round of 32	
1992–93	1st	12	32	7	11	14	27–40	25	Quarterfinals	
1993–94	1st	10	30	8	9	13	25–39	25	Round of 32	
1994–95	1st	16	30	3	5	22	14–74	11	Round of 16	Relegated
1995	2nd	10	14	5	1	8	10–15	16	Round of 32	
1996	2nd	9	24	8	8	8	33–24	32	Round of 32	
1997	2nd	15	30	5	7	18	17–50	22	Round of 32	Relegated
1998	3rd	6	26	14	5	7	44–18	47	Round of 32	
1999	3rd	6	23^{1}	11	7	5	39–23	40		
2000	3rd	7	22	9	5	8	35–37	32		Disbanded

- ^{1} Last round match cancelled and never replayed.
