= FC Kommunalnik Slonim =

- Full name: Football Club Kommunalnik Slonim
- Founded: 1969
- Dissolved: 2013 (merged into FC Slonim)
- Ground: Yunost Stadium, Slonim
- Capacity: 2,100
- League: Belarusian Second League
- 2012: 8th
Home colours	Away colours

FC Kommunalnik Slonim was a Belarusian football club based in Slonim, Grodno Oblast.

== History ==
The team was founded in 1969. During the Soviet era the club played in Grodno Oblast league or lower levels of Belarusian SSR league as Torpedo Slonim (1969–1971), Kommunalnik Slonim (1972–1986), Start Slonim (1972–1986) and Albertin Slonim (since 1989).

In 1992, the team participated in the Belarusian Second League championship and won the promotion to the First League after finishing on the second place. In 1994, they were renamed to KPF Slonim and in 1996 to Kommunalnik Slonim. In 1997, Kommunalnik made its debut in the Premier League, but was relegated after 1998. The team spent one more season in top league in 2000, and then relegated again.

After ten seasons in the First League, Kommunalnik relegated again to the Second League in 2011. In January 2013, Kommunalnik merged with emerging local rivals Beltransgaz Slonim into FC Slonim (which became a continuation of Beltransgaz Slonim).

== League and Cup history ==
Season	Level	Pos	Pld	W	D	L	Goals	Points	Domestic Cup	Notes
1992	3rd	2	15	8	5	2	21–10	21	Round of 32	Promoted
1992–93	2nd	7	30	14	5	11	29–30	33	Round of 64	
1993–94	2nd	11	28	5	12	11	32–33	22	Round of 16	
1994–95	2nd	4	30	17	5	8	64–31	39	Round of 64	
1995	2nd	5	14	7	5	2	25–15	26	Round of 16	
1996	2nd	2	24	13	6	5	45–17	45	Round of 16	Promoted
1997	1st	11	30	9	3	18	32–61	30	Round of 32	
1998	1st	15	28	3	5	20	14–63	14	Round of 16	Relegated
1999	2nd	1	30	18	5	7	57–29	59	Round of 32	Promoted
2000	1st	16	30	3	8	19	19–66	17	Round of 32	Relegated
2001	2nd	10	28	9	5	14	33–42	32	Round of 16	
2002	2nd	8	30	9	8	13	27–41	35	Round of 32	
2003	2nd	10	30	11	9	10	37–39	42	Round of 32	
2004	2nd	11	30	9	7	14	33–47	34	Round of 64	
2005	2nd	13	30	8	4	18	35–43	28	Round of 16	
2006	2nd	11	26	7	5	14	32–44	26	Round of 32	
2007	2nd	12	26	5	5	16	22–48	20	Round of 64	
2008	2nd	10	26	6	7	13	21–36	25	Round of 32	
2009	2nd	10	26	7	8	11	20–32	29	Round of 16	
2010	2nd	15	30	5	13	12	23–48	28	Round of 32	Relegated
