= FC Lida =

Belarusian football club

- Full name: Football Club Lida
- Founded: 1962; 64 years ago
- Ground: Yunost Stadium / Start Stadium (Lida)
- Capacity: 2,870 / 3,000
- Chairman: Valentin Burnos
- Manager: Alyaksey Dabravolski
- League: Belarusian First League
- 2025: 5th of 18
- Website: http://fclida.by/
Home colours	Away colours

FC Lida (Belarusian: ФК Ліда, Russian: ФК Лида) is a Belarusian professional association football club based in Lida, Grodno Oblast.

== History ==
The club was founded in 1962 as Krasnoye Znamya Lida. In 1963, they were renamed to Vympel Lida and in 1971 to Obuvschik Lida. Obuvschik Lida became four-time champion of the Belarusian SSR (1983, 1985, 1986, 1989) and two-time winner of the Super Cup (1984, 1986).Since 1997, the club is known as FC Lida.

In 1992, the club was included in the Belarusian Premier League, where they played during 1992–1993, 1994–1996 and 1999–2000. During 1993–94, 1997–1998 and since 2001, they have been playing in the Belarusian First League, sans two short drops to the Second League (in 2007 and 2011). The team got its new promotion to the Belarusian Premier League after reaching the 2nd position in 2026 Belarusian First League. It will be their 2nd appearance in the top division in the 21st century.

=== Name changes ===
- 1962: Krasnoye Znamya Lida
- 1963: Vympel Lida
- 1971: Obuvshchik Lida
- 1997: FC Lida

== Honours ==
- Belarusian SSR League
  - Winners (4): 1983, 1985, 1986, 1989
- Belarusian SSR Super Cup
  - Winners (2): 1984, 1986

== Current squad ==
As of 8 September 2026

Note: Flags indicate national team as defined under FIFA eligibility rules; some limited exceptions apply. Players may hold more than one non-FIFA nationality.

No.	Pos.	Nation	Player
1	GK	BLR	Vladislav Vasilyuchek
2	DF	BLR	Artyom Poluyanov (on loan from Isloch Minsk Raion)
3	DF	BLR	Aleksey Legchilin
4	DF	BLR	Mikhail Orekhvo
5	DF	BLR	Igor Tymonyuk
6	DF	BLR	Maksim Katsynel (on loan from Neman Grodno)
7	MF	BLR	Artyom Drozdovich
8	MF	BLR	Arseniy Galushko
9	MF	BLR	Ivan Kontsevoy (on loan from Neman Grodno)
10	MF	BLR	Aleksey Chernodarov
11	MF	BLR	Daniil Chergeyko (on loan from Unixlabs Minsk)
13	MF	BLR	Yevgeniy Karpovich
14	DF	BLR	Denis Khodyko
15	DF	BLR	Artyom Salygo

No.	Pos.	Nation	Player
16	GK	BLR	Artem Yanushko
17	MF	RUS	Aleksandr Puzach
18	MF	RUS	Zakhar Dyatlov
20	MF	BLR	Alfred Mazurich (on loan from Neman Grodno)
21	FW	BLR	Sergey Zhurnevich (on loan from Neman Grodno)
22	MF	BLR	Denis Khvostovich
23	MF	RUS	Maks Zhestaryov
25	GK	BLR	Yevgeny Gremza
27	FW	BLR	Dmitry Vashkevich
—	DF	BLR	Georgiy Belov
—	DF	BLR	Vadim Ivanovsky
—	MF	BLR	Nikita Zaytsev
—	MF	BLR	Yegor Zaytsev

== League and cup history ==
Season	Level	Pos	Pld	W	D	L	Goals	Points	Domestic Cup	Notes
1992	1st	12	15	4	3	8	13–18	11	Round of 16	
1992–93	1st	16	32	4	9	19	13–45	17	Rounf of 32	Relegated
1993–94	2nd	1	28	20	6	2	49–14	46	Round of 32	Promoted
1994–95	1st	8	30	10	10	10	32–36	30	Round of 16	
1995	1st	12	15	4	4	7	15–23	16	Rounf of 32	
1996	1st	15	30	6	6	18	26–43	24	Rounf of 32	Relegated
1997	2nd	3	30	20	5	5	59–24	65	Round of 32	
1998	2nd	1	30	23	5	2	65–19	74	Round of 16	Promoted
1999	1st	13	30	7	4	19	27–64	25	Rounf of 32	
2000	1st	14	30	3	10	17	16–60	19	Quarter-finals	Relegated
2001	2nd	9	28	9	7	12	27–33	34	Round of 32	
2002	2nd	6	30	14	4	12	39–39	46	Round of 64	
2003	2nd	8	30	13	4	13	45–35	43	Round of 64	
2004	2nd	8	30	11	7	12	37–30	40	–	
2005	2nd	10	30	10	7	13	41–43	37	Round of 16	
2006	2nd	13	26	6	5	15	23–45	23	Round of 32	Relegated
2007	3rd	2	30	20	5	5	78–34	65	Round of 32	Promoted
2008	2nd	11	26	6	7	13	24–45	25	Round of 32	
2009	2nd	11	26	6	8	12	19–31	26	Round of 32	
2010	2nd	16	30	4	7	19	23–59	19	Round of 64	Relegated
2011	3rd	1	30	23	4	3	60–21	73	Round of 32	Promoted
2012	2nd	11	28	8	6	14	32–49	30	Quarter-finals	
2013	2nd	4	30	15	7	8	53–38	52	Round of 32	
2014	2nd	14	30	10	1	19	46–64	31	Round of 32	
2015	2nd	6	30	15	5	10	60–53	50	Round of 32	
2016	2nd	6	26	11	5	10	26-33	38	Round of 32	
2026	2nd	2	34	23	3	8	63-48	72		Promoted
2027	1st		30							

== Managers ==
- (Belarus) Ivan Prokhorov (1992)
- (Belarus) Vladimir Grishanovich (1993)
- (Belarus) Andrey Petrov (1994–1996)
- (Belarus) Henry Romanovsky (1996–1997)
- (Belarus) Ivan Prokhorov (1998–2000)
- (Belarus) Andrey Petrov (2000–2002)
- (Belarus) Vitali Rashkevich (2002–2004)
- (Belarus) Alexei Shubenok (2004–2005)
- (Belarus) Dmitry Makarenko (2005–2006)
- (Belarus) Igor Frolov (2007)
- (Belarus) Pavel Batyuto / Sergei Petrushevsky (2008)
- (Belarus) Andrey Petrov (2009)
- (Belarus) Sergei Petrushevsky / Sergei Salygo (2010)
- (Belarus) Igor Frolov (2011–2012)
- (Belarus) Andrey Petrov (2013–2014)
- (Belarus) Maxim Lychev / Dmitry Makarenko (2015)
- (Belarus) Vital Tarashchyk / Viachaslau Herashchanka (2016)
- (Belarus) Pyotr Kachuro / Sergey Solodovnikov (2017)
- (Belarus) Sergey Solodovnikov (2018)
- (Belarus) Viachaslau Herashchanka / Yury Karatai (2019)
- (Belarus) Yury Karatai / Sergei Petrushevsky (2020)
- (Belarus) Sergei Petrushevsky (2021)
- (Belarus) Aliaksei Dabravolski (2021–)
