= 1992 Belarusian Cup =

Tournament details
- Country: Belarus
- Teams: 48

Final positions
- Champions: Dinamo Minsk (1st title)
- Runners-up: Dnepr Mogilev

Tournament statistics
- Matches played: 47
- Goals scored: 164 (3.49 per match)
- Top goal scorer(s): Radzislaw Arlowski (7 goals)

The 1992 Belarusian Cup was the inaugural season of the annual Belarusian football cup competition. Contrary to the league season, the competition is conducted in a fall-spring rhythm. It began on 6 May 1992 with the preliminary round and ended on 24 June 1992 with the final at the Dinamo Stadium in Minsk.

FC Dinamo Minsk won the final against FC Dnepr Mogilev to win their first title.

== Preliminary round ==
The games were played on 6 May 1992.

Team 1	Score	Team 2
Khimik Svetlogorsk (II)	4–1	Kommunalnik Pinsk (II)
Stroitel Bereza (III)	3–4 (a.e.t.)	Albertin Slonim (III)
Shinnik Bobruisk (II)	3–0	Polesye Mazyr (II)
Zara Iazyl (III)	1–1 (a.e.t.) (3–1 p)	SKIF-RShVSM Minsk (II)
Spartak Shklow (III)	0–1	Stankostroitel Smorgon (II)
Dinamo-2 Minsk (II)	2–1	Oresa Lyuban (III)
Khimik Kletsk (III)	2–3	KIM-2 Vitebsk (II)
Smena Minsk (III)	5–2	Derevoobrabotchik Mosty (III)
Dnepr Rogachev (III)	2–2 (a.e.t.) (4–3 p)	Metrostroy Minsk (III)
Niva Samokhvalovichi (II)	2–0	Traktor Minsk (III)
Neman Stolbtsy (II)	2–6	Legmash Orsha (III)
Selmash Mogilev (II)	w/o	Berezina Borisov (III)
Kolos Ustye (II)	w/o	Belarus Maryina Gorka (II)
Orbita Minsk (II)	0–2	Ataka-407 Minsk (III)
Luch Minsk (II)	2–1	Khimvolokno Grodno (II)
ZLiN Gomel (III)	2–1	Naftan Novopolotsk (III)

== Round of 32 ==
The games were played on 13 May 1992.

Team 1	Score	Team 2
Dinamo Brest	4–1	Khimik Svetlogorsk (II)
Albertin Slonim (III)	0–3	Traktor Bobruisk
Gomselmash Gomel	1–1 (a.e.t.) (3–2 p)	Shinnik Bobruisk (II)
Dnepr Mogilev	4–2	Zara Iazyl (III)
Stankostroitel Smorgon (II)	0–1	KIM Vitebsk
Shakhtyor Soligorsk	1–1 (a.e.t.) (3–2 p)	Dinamo-2 Minsk (II)
KIM-2 Vitebsk (II)	0–1	Stroitel Starye Dorogi
Metalurg Molodechno	4–0	Smena Minsk (III)
Dnepr Rogachev (III)	4–0	Torpedo Mogilev
Khimik Grodno	w/o	Niva Samokhvalovichi (II)
Legmash Orsha	1–3	Torpedo Minsk
BelAZ Zhodino	0–1	Selmash Mogilev (II)
Vedrich Rechitsa	0–1 (a.e.t.)	Kolos Ustye (II)
Ataka-407 Minsk (III)	1–1 (a.e.t.) (2–3 p)	Obuvshchik Lida
SKB-Lokomotiv Vitebsk	1–2	Luch Minsk (II)
Dinamo Minsk	11–0	ZLiN Gomel (III)

== Round of 16 ==
The games were played on 20 May 1992.

Team 1	Score	Team 2
Traktor Bobruisk	6–2	Gomselmash Gomel
KIM Vitebsk	0–1	Dnepr Mogilev
Stroitel Starye Dorogi	0–0 (a.e.t.) (4–3 p)	Shakhtyor Soligorsk
Dnepr Rogachev (III)	0–1	Metalurg Molodechno
Torpedo Minsk	4–2	Khimik Grodno
Selmash Mogilev (II)	0–1	Dinamo Brest
Luch Minsk (II)	1–4	Kolos Ustye (II)
Obuvshchik Lida	0–6	Dinamo Minsk

== Quarterfinals ==
The games were played on 27 May 1992.

Team 1	Score	Team 2
Dinamo Brest	0–0 (a.e.t.) (5–3 p)	Traktor Bobruisk
Dnepr Mogilev	5–1 (a.e.t.)	Stroitel Starye Dorogi
Metalurg Molodechno	4–0	Kolos Ustye (II)
Dinamo Minsk	2–1	Torpedo Minsk

== Semifinals ==
The games were played on 3 June 1992.

Team 1	Score	Team 2
Dnepr Mogilev	3–2	Dinamo Brest
Dinamo Minsk	3–2	Metalurg Molodechno

== Final ==
The final match was played on 24 June 1992 at the Dinamo Stadium in Minsk.

24 June 1992
18:00 UTC+3

Dinamo Minsk	6–1	Dnepr Mogilev
Byalkevich 45'; Antonovich 59'; Vyalichka 63'; Herasimets 78'; Zhuravel 81', 90'	Report	Smirnov 66' (pen.)

Dinamo Stadium, Minsk
Attendance: 2,500
Referee: Vadim Zhuk (Minsk)

Dinamo Minsk	Dnepr Mogilev

DINAMO:
GK	(Belarus) Yury Kurbyko
DF	(Belarus) Gennady Lesun
DF	(Belarus) Erik Yakhimovich	(substituted off) 6'
DF	(Belarus) Alyaksandr Taykow
MF	(Belarus) Radzislaw Arlowski	(yellow card) 82'
MF	(Belarus) Valyantsin Byalkevich
MF	(Belarus) Yevgeni Kashentsev
MF	(Lithuania) Audrius Žuta	(substituted off) 23'
MF	(Belarus) Syarhey Herasimets
MF	(Belarus) Yuri Antonovich	(substituted off) 75'
FW	(Belarus) Valery Vyalichka
Substitutes:
GK	(Belarus) Andrei Satsunkevich
DF	(Belarus) Pavel Radnyonak	(substituted on) 23'
DF	(Belarus) Dmitri Klimovich	(substituted on) 75'
MF	(Belarus) Uladzimir Zhuravel	(substituted on) 6'
FW	(Belarus) Aleh Charnyawski
Manager:
(Belarus) Mikhail Vergeyenko

DNEPR:
GK	(Belarus) Andrey Lyubchenko
DF	(Belarus) Vladimir Golmak	(yellow card) 38'
DF	(Belarus) Vyacheslav Banul		(substituted off) 83'
DF	(Belarus) Valery Solodovnikov
DF	(Belarus) Aleksandr Mozgovoy
MF	(Belarus) Vyacheslav Geraschenko
MF	(Belarus) Mikhail Smirnov	(yellow card) 45'	(substituted off) 71'
MF	(Belarus) Sergey Domashevich		(substituted off) 46'
FW	(Belarus) Viktor Naumov
FW	(Belarus) Andrey Skorobogatko
FW	(Belarus) Oleg Radushko
Substitutes:
GK	(Belarus) Andrey Klyashtorny
DF	(Belarus) Vyacheslav Levchuk		(substituted on) 83'
DF	(Belarus) Ernest Ternovsky		(substituted on) 71'
MF	(Belarus) Oleg Kuzmenok		(substituted on) 46'
MF	(Belarus) Andrey Volodkin
FW	(Belarus) Artem Ovodov
Manager:
(Belarus) Valery Streltsov
