= 1995 Belarusian First League =

Belarusian First League
- Season: 1995
- Champions: Naftan-Devon Novopolotsk
- Promoted: Naftan-Devon Novopolotsk
- Relegated: Khimvolokno Grodno
- Matches: 105
- Goals: 268 (2.55 per match)

1995 Belarusian First League was the fifth season of 2nd level football championship in Belarus. It started in July and ended in November 1995.

== Team changes from 1994–95 season ==
The two best teams of 1994–95 First League (MPKC Mozyr and Ataka-Aura Minsk) were promoted to Belarusian Premier League. They were replaced by two lowest placed teams of 1994–95 Premier League (Gomselmash Gomel and Lokomotiv Vitebsk).

The three lowest-placed teams of the last season (ZLiN Gomel, AFViS-RShVSM Minsk and Stroitel Vitebsk) relegated to the Second League. Stroitel Vitebsk eventually disbanded before the start of the season. These teams were replaced by three best teams of 1994–95 Second League (Naftan-Devon Novopolotsk, Fomalgaut Borisov and Dinamo-Juni Minsk).

Before the start of the season, Gomselmash Gomel were renamed to FC Gomel.

Santanas Samokhvalovichi, placed 8th last season, withdrew to amateur level due to financial troubles, leaving the league with 15 teams for this season.

== Overview ==
Newcomers Naftan-Devon Novopolotsk won the tournament and were promoted to the Premier League. Runners-up Kommunalnik Pinsk qualified to the promotion play-offs against 15th team of Premier League but lost and remained in the First League. Khimvolokno Grodno, who finished 15th, relegated to the Second League.

== Teams and locations ==
Location of teams in 1995 Belarusian First League

Team	Location	Position in 1994–95
Gomel	Gomel	Premier League, 15
Lokomotiv	Vitebsk	Premier League, 16
Kommunalnik	Pinsk	3
KPF	Slonim	4
Kardan-Flyers	Grodno	5
Stroitel	Starye Dorogi	6
Brestbytkhim	Brest	7
Khimik	Svetlogorsk	9
Torpedo	Zhodino	10
Transmash	Mogilev	11
Khimvolokno	Grodno	12
Kimovets	Vitebsk	13
Naftan-Devon	Novopolotsk	Second League, 1
Fomalgaut	Borisov	Second League, 2
Dinamo-Juni	Minsk	Second League, 3

== League table ==
Pos	Team	Pld	W	D	L	GF	GA	GD	Pts	Promotion or relegation
1	Naftan-Devon Novopolotsk (P)	14	10	2	2	29	14	+15	32	Promotion to Belarusian Premier League
2	Kommunalnik Pinsk	14	9	2	3	22	13	+9	29	Qualification for promotion play-off
3	Fomalgaut Borisov	14	8	4	2	24	13	+11	28	
4	Kardan-Flyers Grodno	14	8	3	3	28	18	+10	27	
5	KPF Slonim	14	7	5	2	25	15	+10	26	
6	Brestbytkhim Brest	14	8	1	5	19	14	+5	25	
7	Transmash Mogilev	14	6	4	4	20	16	+4	22	
8	Khimik Svetlogorsk	14	5	2	7	19	17	+2	17 (Note: Khimik Svetlogorsk placed above Gomel by better head-to-head record (1–0 win).)	
9	Gomel	14	5	2	7	19	17	+2	17	
10	Lokomotiv Vitebsk	14	5	1	8	10	15	−5	16	
11	Torpedo Zhodino	14	3	6	5	13	15	−2	15	
12	Dinamo-Juni Minsk	14	4	2	8	12	22	−10	14	
13	Stroitel Starye Dorogi	14	3	3	8	12	26	−14	12	
14	Kimovets Vitebsk	14	2	3	9	9	28	−19	9	
15	Khimvolokno Grodno (R)	14	0	4	10	7	25	−18	4	Relegation to Belarusian Second League

Source: rsssf.com
Rules for classification: 1st points; 2nd matches won; 3rd head-to-head (points, matches won, goal difference, goals scored); 4th goal difference; 5th goals scored
(P) Promoted; (R) Relegated

=== Promotion play-off ===
Kommunalnik Pinsk had to play two-legged play-off against Shinnik Bobruisk, who finished 15th in Premier League. Shinnik won and both teams remained in their respective leagues.

Team #1	Agg.	Team #1	1st leg	2nd leg
Shinnik Bobruisk	3–2	Kommunalnik Pinsk	0–2	3–0

== Top goalscorers ==
Rank	Goalscorer	Team	Goals
1	(Belarus) Sergey Solodovnikov	Kardan-Flyers Grodno	11
2	(Belarus) Valery Strypeykis	Naftan-Devon Novopolotsk	9
3	(Ukraine) Ruslan Lyashenko	Naftan-Devon Novopolotsk	7
3	(Belarus) Syarhey Pyatrukovich	Fomalgaut Borisov	7

== See also ==
- 1995 Belarusian Premier League
- 1995–96 Belarusian Cup
