= 1992–93 Belarusian First League =

Belarusian First League
- Season: 1992–93
- Champions: Shinnik Bobruisk
- Promoted: Shinnik Bobruisk
- Relegated: Neman Stolbtsy; Stankostroitel Smorgon
- Matches: 240
- Goals: 571 (2.38 per match)
- Top goalscorer: Vladimir Kravchuk (23)

1992–93 Belarusian First League was the second season of 2nd level football championship in Belarus. It started in August 1992 and ended in June 1993.

== Team changes from 1992 season ==
The winners of last season (Dinamo-2 Minsk) were promoted to Belarusian Premier League, which became possible after they split from their parent team Dinamo Minsk. No teams relegated directly from the Premier League as it was temporary expanded from 16 to 17 teams.

One team that finished at the bottom of 1992 season table (Stankostroitel Smorgon) relegated to the Second League. To compensate for Premier League expansion, they were replaced by two best teams of 1992 Second League (Smena Minsk and Albertin Slonim).

Luch Minsk and Orbita Minsk (who finished 12th and 15th last season) withdrew from the league to amateur lever due to lack of financing. They were replaced by ZLiN Gomel (Second League third-placed team) and Stankostroitel Smorgon (who were spared from relegation).

Before the start of the season Niva Samokhvalovichi changed their name to Niva-Trudovye Rezervy Samokhvalovichi and SKIF-RShVSM to AFViS-RShVSM Minsk. Kolos Ustye was renamed to Kolos-Stroitel Ustye during the winter break.

== Overview ==
Shinnik Bobruisk won the tournament and were promoted the Premier League. Neman Stolbtsy and Stankostroitel Smorgon, who finished 15th and 16th respectively, relegated to the Second League.

== Teams and locations ==
Location of teams in 1992–93 Belarusian First League

Team	Location	Position in 1992
Shinnik	Bobruisk	2
Kommunalnik	Pinsk	3
Selmash	Mogilev	4
Niva-Trudovye Rezervy	Samokhvalovichi	5
AFViS-RShVSM	Minsk	6
Polesye	Mozyr	7
Khimvolokno	Grodno	8
Khimik	Svetlogorsk	9
Neman	Stolbtsy	10
Kolos	Ustye	11
KIM-2	Vitebsk	13
Belarus	Maryina Gorka	14
Stankostroitel	Smorgon	16
Smena	Minsk	Second League, 1
Albertin	Slonim	Second League, 2
ZLiN	Gomel	Second League, 3

== League table ==
Pos	Team	Pld	W	D	L	GF	GA	GD	Pts	Promotion or relegation
1	Shinnik Bobruisk (P)	30	21	8	1	69	19	+50	50	Promotion to Belarusian Premier League
2	Polesye Mozyr	30	22	5	3	54	14	+40	49	
3	Selmash Mogilev	30	12	13	5	48	20	+28	37	
4	Khimik Svetlogorsk	30	15	4	11	54	36	+18	34 (Note: Khimik Svetlogorsk placed above Kommunalnik Pinsk by better head-to-head record (2–0, 3–4).)	
5	Kommunalnik Pinsk	30	15	4	11	52	40	+12	34	
6	ZLiN Gomel	30	14	6	10	51	37	+14	34	
7	Albertin Slonim	30	14	5	11	29	30	−1	33	
8	Smena Minsk	30	12	6	12	42	50	−8	30	
9	Khimvolokno Grodno	30	11	8	11	31	32	−1	30	
10	Kolos-Stroitel Ustye	30	9	9	12	42	47	−5	27 (Note: Kolos-Stroitel Ustye placed above Niva-Trudovye Rezervy Samokhvalovichi by better head-to-head record (2–2, 1–0).)	
11	Niva-Tr. Rez. Samokhvalovichi	30	9	9	12	29	49	−20	27	
12	Belarus Maryina Gorka	30	10	6	14	37	42	−5	26	
13	AFViS-RShVSM Minsk	30	9	4	17	37	49	−12	22	
14	KIM-2 Vitebsk	30	6	7	17	29	44	−15	19	
15	Neman Stolbtsy (R)	30	5	5	20	23	65	−42	15	Relegation to Belarusian Second League
16	Stankostroitel Smorgon (R)	30	4	5	21	17	70	−53	13	Relegation to Belarusian Second League

Source: rsssf.com
Rules for classification: 1st points; 2nd matches won; 3rd head-to-head (points, matches won, goal difference, goals scored); 4th goal difference; 5th goals scored
(P) Promoted; (R) Relegated

== Top goalscorers ==
Rank	Goalscorer	Team	Goals
1	(Belarus) Vladimir Kravchuk	Khimik Svetlogorsk	23
2	(Belarus) Aleksandr Dashkevich	Polesye Mozyr	18
2	(Belarus) Dmitry Klyuiko	Shinnik Bobruisk	18
4	(Belarus) Vitaliy Kirilko	Kommunalnik Pinsk	14
5	(Belarus) Andrey Ivanow	ZLiN Gomel	12

== See also ==
- 1992–93 Belarusian Premier League
- 1992–93 Belarusian Cup
