= 1994–95 Belarusian First League =

Belarusian First League
- Season: 1994–95
- Champions: MPKC Mozyr
- Promoted: MPKC Mozyr; Ataka-Aura Minsk
- Relegated: Santanas Samokhvalovichi; ZLiN Gomel; AFViS-RShVSM Minsk; Stroitel Vitebsk
- Matches: 240
- Goals: 657 (2.74 per match)

1994–95 Belarusian First League was the fourth season of 2nd level football championship in Belarus. It started in July 1994 and ended in June 1995.

== Team changes from 1993–94 season ==
Winners of 1993–94 First League (Obuvshchik Lida) were promoted to Belarusian Premier League. They were replaced by the last placed team of 1993–94 Premier League (Stroitel Starye Dorogi).

Smena Minsk, who finished 15th, relegated to the Second League. They were replaced by two best teams of 1993–94 Second League (Kardan-Flyers Grodno and Ataka-Aura Minsk). The number of participating teams thus was restored to 16.

Before the start of the season Selmash Mogilev were renamed to Transmash Mogilev. During the winter break, Polesye Mozyr changed their name to MPKC Mozyr and KIM-2 Vitebsk changed their name to Kimovets Vitebsk.

== Overview ==
MPKC Mozyr won the tournament and were promoted to the Premier League, as were runners-up Ataka-Aura Minsk. ZLiN Gomel, AFViS-RShVSM Minsk and Stroitel Vitebsk, who finished 14th, 15th and 16th respectively, relegated to the Second League. Santanas Samokhvalovichi, who finished 8th, withdrew to the amateur level after the season due to financial troubles.

== Teams and locations ==
Location of teams in 1994–95 Belarusian First League

Team	Location	Position in 1993–94
Stroitel	Starye Dorogi	Premier League, 16
Polesye	Mozyr	2
Kommunalnik	Pinsk	3
Transmash	Mogilev	4
Brestbytkhim	Brest	5
Santanas	Samokhvalovichi	6
ZLiN	Gomel	7
Torpedo	Zhodino	8
Khimik	Svetlogorsk	9
KIM-2	Vitebsk	10
KPF	Slonim	11
Stroitel	Vitebsk	12
Khimvolokno	Grodno	13
AFViS-RShVSM	Minsk	14
Kardan-Flyers	Grodno	Second League, 1
Ataka-Aura	Minsk	Second League, 2

== League table ==
Pos	Team	Pld	W	D	L	GF	GA	GD	Pts	Promotion or relegation
1	MPKC Mozyr (P)	30	24	3	3	106	17	+89	51	Promotion to Belarusian Premier League
2	Ataka-Aura Minsk (P)	30	18	7	5	57	20	+37	43	Promotion to Belarusian Premier League
3	Kommunalnik Pinsk	30	16	8	6	45	26	+19	40	
4	KPF Slonim	30	17	5	8	64	31	+33	39	
5	Kardan-Flyers Grodno	30	14	9	7	53	37	+16	37	
6	Stroitel Starye Dorogi	30	14	6	10	44	32	+12	34	
7	Brestbytkhim Brest	30	13	6	11	41	31	+10	32	
8	Santanas Samokhvalovichi (R)	30	10	12	8	40	34	+6	32	Relegation to amateur level
9	Khimik Svetlogorsk	30	12	4	14	31	48	−17	28	
10	Torpedo Zhodino	30	11	6	13	37	35	+2	28	
11	Transmash Mogilev	30	9	8	13	30	31	−1	26	
12	Khimvolokno Grodno	30	7	11	12	15	35	−20	25	
13	Kimovets Vitebsk	30	9	5	16	30	46	−16	23	
14	ZLiN Gomel (R)	30	8	5	17	26	67	−41	21	Relegation to Belarusian Second League
15	AFViS-RShVSM Minsk (R)	30	5	7	18	29	79	−50	17	Relegation to Belarusian Second League
16	Stroitel Vitebsk (R)	30	1	2	27	9	88	−79	4	Relegation to Belarusian Second League

Source: rsssf.com
Rules for classification: 1st points; 2nd matches won; 3rd head-to-head (points, matches won, goal difference, goals scored); 4th goal difference; 5th goals scored
(P) Promoted; (R) Relegated

== Top goalscorers ==
Rank	Goalscorer	Team	Goals
1	(Belarus) Sergey Yaromko	MPKC Mozyr	24
2	(Russia) Vladimir Skorobogaty	MPKC Mozyr	17
3	(Belarus) Aleksandr Gavlush	Ataka-Aura Minsk	16
4	(Belarus) Dzmitry Balashow	KPF Slonim	15
4	(Belarus) Sergey Solodovnikov	Kardan-Flyers Grodno	15

== See also ==
- 1994–95 Belarusian Premier League
- 1994–95 Belarusian Cup
