= 1993–94 Belarusian First League =

Belarusian First League
- Season: 1993–94
- Champions: Obuvshchik Lida
- Promoted: Obuvshchik Lida
- Relegated: Smena Minsk
- Matches: 210
- Goals: 492 (2.34 per match)

1993–94 Belarusian First League was the third season of 2nd level football championship in Belarus. It started in July 1993 and ended in June 1994.

== Team changes from 1992–93 season ==
Winners of 1992–93 Belarusian First League (Shinnik Bobruisk) were promoted to Belarusian Premier League. They were replaced by two teams relegated from the Premier League (Obuvshchik Lida and Torpedo Zhodino).

Neman Stolbtsy and Stankostroitel Smorgon, who finished 15th and 16th respectively, relegated to the Second League. They were replaced by the winners of 1992–93 Second League (Brestbytkhim Brest).

Before the start of the season, Niva-Trudovye Rezervy Samokhvalovichi changed their name to Santanas Samokhvalovichi. Kolos-Stroitel Ustye relocated to Vitebsk and changed their name to Stroitel Vitebsk. Albertin Slonim were renamed to KPF Slonim before 3rd matchday in July.

== Overview ==
Belarus Maryina Gorka were excluded from the league in October after 14 matchdays, after failing to show up for away match twice during the season. Their results were annulled and the club was excluded from the table.

Obuvshchik Lida won the tournament and returned to the Premier League after one season of absence. Smena Minsk, who finished last, relegated to the Second League.

== Teams and locations ==
Location of teams in 1993–94 Belarusian First League

| Team | Location | Position in 1992–93 |
|---|---|---|
| Obuvshchik | Lida | Premier League, 16 |
| Torpedo | Zhodino | Premier League, 17 |
| Polesye | Mozyr | 2 |
| Selmash | Mogilev | 3 |
| Khimik | Svetlogorsk | 4 |
| Kommunalnik | Pinsk | 5 |
| ZLiN | Gomel | 6 |
| KPF | Slonim | 7 |
| Smena | Minsk | 8 |
| Khimvolokno | Grodno | 9 |
| Stroitel | Vitebsk | 10 |
| Santanas | Samokhvalovichi | 11 |
| Belarus | Maryina Gorka | 12 |
| AFViS-RShVSM | Minsk | 13 |
| KIM-2 | Vitebsk | 14 |
| Brestbytkhim | Brest | Second League, 1 |

== League table ==
| Pos | Team | Pld | W | D | L | GF | GA | GD | Pts | Promotion or relegation |
|---|---|---|---|---|---|---|---|---|---|---|
| 1 | Obuvshchik Lida (P) | 28 | 20 | 6 | 2 | 49 | 14 | +35 | 46 | Promotion to Belarusian Premier League |
| 2 | Polesye Mozyr | 28 | 19 | 5 | 4 | 48 | 18 | +30 | 43 | |
| 3 | Kommunalnik Pinsk | 28 | 17 | 6 | 5 | 58 | 21 | +37 | 40 | |
| 4 | Selmash Mogilev | 28 | 17 | 5 | 6 | 47 | 26 | +21 | 39 | |
| 5 | Brestbytkhim Brest | 28 | 12 | 10 | 6 | 29 | 17 | +12 | 34 | |
| 6 | Santanas Samokhvalovichi | 28 | 11 | 8 | 9 | 29 | 28 | +1 | 30 | |
| 7 | ZLiN Gomel | 28 | 9 | 8 | 11 | 28 | 37 | −9 | 26 | |
| 8 | Torpedo Zhodino | 28 | 8 | 10 | 10 | 24 | 29 | −5 | 26 | |
| 9 | Khimik Svetlogorsk | 28 | 10 | 3 | 15 | 38 | 46 | −8 | 23 | |
| 10 | KIM-2 Vitebsk | 28 | 7 | 9 | 12 | 26 | 40 | −14 | 23 | |
| 11 | KPF Slonim | 28 | 5 | 12 | 11 | 32 | 33 | −1 | 22 | |
| 12 | Stroitel Vitebsk | 28 | 9 | 3 | 16 | 29 | 49 | −20 | 21 | |
| 13 | Khimvolokno Grodno | 28 | 4 | 10 | 14 | 20 | 41 | −21 | 18 | |
| 14 | AFViS-RShVSM Minsk | 28 | 4 | 8 | 16 | 20 | 43 | −23 | 16 | |
| 15 | Smena Minsk (R) | 28 | 3 | 7 | 18 | 15 | 50 | −35 | 13 | Relegation to Belarusian Second League |

Source: rsssf.com
Rules for classification: 1st points; 2nd matches won; 3rd head-to-head (points, matches won, goal difference, goals scored); 4th goal difference; 5th goals scored
(P) Promoted; (R) Relegated

== Top goalscorers ==
| Rank | Goalscorer | Team | Goals |
|---|---|---|---|
| 1 | (Belarus) Aleksandr Dashkevich | Polesye Mozyr | 12 |
| 2 | (Belarus) Vladimir Kravchuk | Khimik Svetlogorsk | 10 |
| 2 | (Belarus) Vasiliy Mazur | Kommunalnik Pinsk | 10 |
| 4 | (Belarus) Vitaliy Kirilko | Kommunalnik Pinsk | 9 |
| 4 | (Belarus) Vadim Khloptsev | KIM-2 Vitebsk | 9 |

== See also ==
- 1993–94 Belarusian Premier League
- 1993–94 Belarusian Cup
