= Dmitri Klimovich (footballer, born 1972) =

Belarusian footballer

Personal information
- Date of birth: 30 April 1972 (age 54)
- Place of birth: USSR
- Height: 1.80 m (5 ft 11 in)
- Position: Defender

Youth career
- 1989–1990: Dinamo Minsk

Senior career*
Years	Team	Apps	(Gls)
1990–1993	Dinamo Minsk	51	(2)
1994	Dnepr Mogilev	5	(0)
1994–1995	Santanas Samokhvalovichi		
1995	Fomalgaut Borisov	6	(0)
1997–1998	Dinamo-93 Minsk	21	(1)

International career
1991	Soviet Union U20		
1992	Belarus B	1	(0)
- * Club domestic league appearances and goals

Dmitri Klimovich (Russian: Дмитрий Климович; born 30 April 1972) is a retired Belarusian football defender.

He capped for USSR U-20 team at 1991 FIFA World Youth Championship. Klimovich played in one match for the Belarus B team, a friendly against Lithuania in 1992.

== Honours ==
Dinamo Minsk

- Belarusian Premier League champion: 1992, 1992, 1992–93, 1993–94
- Belarusian Cup winner: 1992, 1993–94
