= Uladzimir Zhuravel =

Belarusian footballer and coach (1971–2018)

Uladzimir Zhuravel Уладзімір Журавель
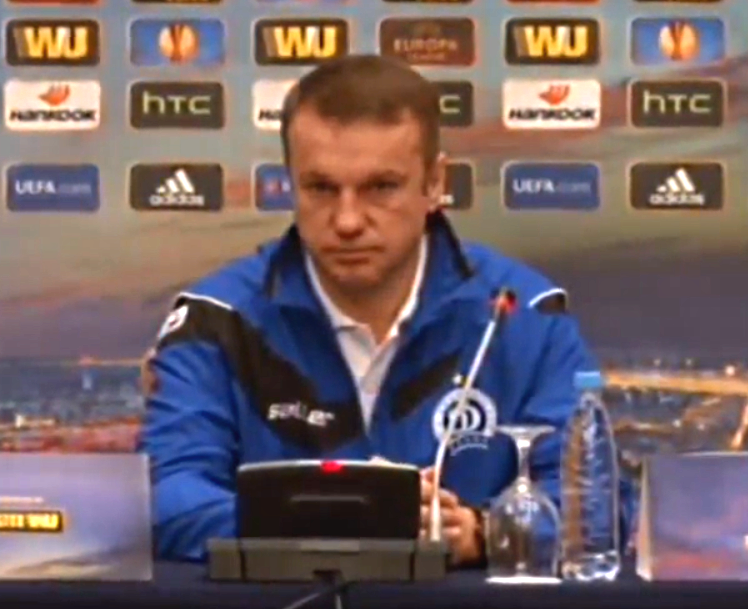

Personal information
- Full name: Uladzimir Ivanavich Zhuravel
- Date of birth: 9 June 1971
- Place of birth: Semipalatinsk, Kazakh SSR
- Date of death: 18 November 2018 (aged 47)
- Place of death: Minsk, Belarus
- Height: 1.75 m (5 ft 9 in)
- Position: Midfielder

Youth career
- 1989–1990: Dinamo Minsk

Senior career*
Years	Team	Apps	(Gls)
1990–1995	Dinamo Minsk	116	(15)
1996	Hapoel Jerusalem	9	(0)
1996–1997	Dinamo Minsk	51	(5)
1998–1999	Zhemchuzhina Sochi	50	(0)
2000–2002	Kristall Smolensk	77	(3)
2003	Darida Minsk Raion	28	(3)
2004–2005	Torpedo Zhodino	24	(0)
Total		355	(26)

International career
1992–1997	Belarus	12	(0)

Managerial career
- 2005–2009: Torpedo Zhodino (assistant)
- 2006: Torpedo Zhodino (caretaker)
- 2010: Shakhtyor Soligorsk (assistant)
- 2010–2013: Shakhtyor Soligorsk
- 2014: Dinamo Minsk
- 2015: Dacia Chișinău (assistant)
- 2015–2016: Gomel
- 2016–2017: Dinamo Brest
- 2018: Shakhter Karagandy
- * Club domestic league appearances and goals

Uladzimir Ivanavich Zhuravel (Belarusian: Уладзімір Іванавіч Журавель; Russian: Владимир Иванович Журавель; 9 June 1971 – 18 November 2018) was a Belarusian professional football player and coach. In 2018 he was the head coach of Shakhter Karagandy. He made his professional debut in the Soviet Top League in 1990 for FC Dinamo Minsk.

== Honours ==
Dinamo Minsk

- Belarusian Premier League champion: 1992, 1992–93, 1993–94, 1994–95, 1995, 1997
- Belarusian Cup winner: 1992, 1993–94

== Death ==
Zhuravel died on 19 November 2018 after a struggle with an illness.
