= Syarhey Pyatrukovich =

Belarusian footballer

Personal information
- Full name: Syarhey Vasilyevich Pyatrukovich
- Date of birth: 29 September 1973 (age 53)
- Place of birth: Minsk
- Height: 1.82 m (5 ft 11 1/2 in)
- Position: Midfielder

Youth career
- AFViS-RShVSM Minsk

Senior career*
Years	Team	Apps	(Gls)
1992	AFViS-RShVSM Minsk	13	(4)
1992	Santanas Samokhvalovichi	11	(1)
1993–1994	Dynamo-Gazovik Tyumen	27	(5)
1994–1995	Fomalgaut Borisov	21	(10)
1996–1997	BATE Borisov	21	(13)
1998	Pskov	14	(4)
1999	Shakhtyor Soligorsk	1	(0)
2000	Zvezda-VA-BGU Minsk	10	(0)
2000–2001	Darida Minsk Raion	19	(11)
2002–2004	MTZ-RIPO Minsk	50	(30)
2005	ZLiN Gomel	4	(0)
- * Club domestic league appearances and goals

Syarhey Vasilevich Pyatrukovich (Belarusian: Сяргей Васiл'евiч Пятруковіч; Russian: Сергей Васильевич Петрукович, Sergei Vasilyevich Petrukovich; born 29 September 1973) is a former Belarusian football player.

== Honours ==
MTZ-RIPO Minsk

- Belarusian Cup winner: 2004–05
