= Sergey Baranovsky =

Belarusian footballer

Personal information
- Date of birth: 27 January 1968 (age 58)
- Position: Forward

Youth career
- 1984–1986: Dinamo Minsk

Senior career*
Years	Team	Apps	(Gls)
1987–1988	Avtomobilist Borisov		
1989–1990	Sputnik Minsk		
1991–1992	Metallurg Molodechno	41	(16)
1992–1995	Dinamo Minsk	57	(27)
Total		98	(43)

International career
1993	Belarus	2	(0)
- * Club domestic league appearances and goals

Sergey Baranovsky (Belarusian: Сяргей Бараноўскі; Russian: Сергей Барановский; born 27 January 1968) is a Belarusian former professional footballer and Belarus international. He was a top scorer of Belarusian Premier League in 1992–93 season. He retired from playing career in 1995 (at the age of 27) due to injury. During 2000s he worked as an assistant referee at domestic football competitions.

== Honours ==
Dinamo Minsk

- Belarusian Premier League champion: 1992–93, 1993–94, 1994–95
- Belarusian Cup winner: 1993–94
