= Ihar Patapaw =

Belarusian footballer and coach

Personal information
- Full name: Ihar Uladzimiravich Patapaw
- Date of birth: 29 December 1966 (age 59)
- Height: 1.87 m (6 ft 1 1/2 in)
- Position: Goalkeeper

Team information
- Current team: Minsk (goalkeeper coach)

Youth career
- DYuSSh DSO Krasnoye Znamya Vitebsk

Senior career*
Years	Team	Apps	(Gls)
1983–1985	Vityaz Vitebsk	6	(0)
1988–1995	Dvina Vitebsk	146	(0)
1996	Chernomorets Novorossiysk	1	(0)
1996	→ Chernomorets-d Novorossiysk	13	(0)
1997–1998	Zarya Leninsk-Kuznetsky	29	(0)
1999–2000	Naftan-Devon Novopolotsk	31	(0)
2012	Vitebsk	2	(0)

Managerial career
- 2014–2015: Vitebsk (goalkeeper coach)
- 2016–: Minsk (goalkeeper coach)
- * Club domestic league appearances and goals

Ihar Uladzimiravich Patapaw (Belarusian: Ігар Уладзіміравіч Патапаў; Russian: Игорь Владимирович Потапов, Igor Vladimirovich Potapov; born 29 December 1966) is a Belarusian football coach and a former player. He works as a goalkeepers' coach with Minsk.

He played one game as a field player for FC Zarya Leninsk-Kuznetsky.

== Honours ==
Dvina Vitebsk

- Belarusian Premier League runner-up: 1992–93 (as KIM Vitebsk), 1994–95
- Belarusian Premier League bronze: 1993–94 (as KIM Vitebsk)
