= Samakhvalavichy (disambiguation) =

Samakhvalavichy is an agrotown in Minsk District, Minsk Region, Belarus.

Samakhvalavichy may also refer to:

- Samakhvalavichy rural council, Minsk District, Minsk Region, Belarus
- Samakhvalavichy (village), Minsk District, Minsk Region, Belarus
