= 1995 Belarusian Premier League =

Annual soccer competition

Belarusian Premier League
- Season: 1995
- Champions: Dinamo Minsk (5th title)
- Relegated: Bobruisk
- UEFA Cup: Dinamo Minsk; Dinamo-93 Minsk
- Cup Winners' Cup: MPKC Mozyr
- Intertoto Cup: Ataka-Aura Minsk
- Matches: 120
- Goals: 359 (2.99 per match)
- Top goalscorer: (Belarus) Sergey Yaromko (16 goals)
- Biggest home win: Vedrich 9–0 Neman (14 October 1995)
- Biggest away win: Bobruisk 0–7 Molodechno (15 October 1995)
- Highest scoring: Vedrich 9–0 Neman (14 October 1995)

The fifth season of the Belarusian Premier League, Belarus's top-tier football league, ran from 10 July to 6 November 1995. Dinamo Minsk were the defending champions.

== Team changes from 1994–95 season ==
Gomselmash Gomel and Lokomotiv Vitebsk, who finished on 15th and 16th places, relegated to Belarusian First League. They were replaced by two newcomers: First League 1994–95 winners MPKC Mozyr and runners-up Ataka-Aura Minsk.

== Overview ==
The championship was played as a single round-robin tournament in the second half of 1995 due to change of the league schedule from winter to summer starting from 1996. This also was the first season with 3-point system. Dinamo Minsk won the championship for the 5th time in a row and qualified for the next season's UEFA Cup, as the Champions League was limited to 23 highest-ranked European national leagues which did not include Belarus. The championship runners-up and 1995–96 Cup winners MPKC Mozyr qualified for the Cup Winners' Cup. The bronze medalists Dinamo-93 Minsk also qualified for UEFA Cup. Bobruisk, who finished in the last place, relegated and eventually dissolved immediately after the season.

== Teams and venues ==
Location of teams in 1995 Belarusian Premier League

| Team | Location | Venue | Capacity | Position in 1994–95 |
|---|---|---|---|---|
| Dinamo Minsk | Minsk | Dinamo Stadium (Minsk) | 50,050 | 1 |
| Dvina Vitebsk | Vitebsk | Dinamo Stadium (Vitebsk) | 5,500 | 2 |
| Dinamo-93 Minsk | Minsk | Traktor Stadium | 25,000 | 3 |
| Molodechno | Molodechno | City Stadium | 5,600 | 4 |
| Dnepr Mogilev | Mogilev | Spartak Stadium (Mogilev) | 12,000 | 5 |
| Torpedo Minsk | Minsk | Torpedo Stadium (Minsk) | 5,000 | 6 |
| Neman Grodno | Grodno | Neman Stadium | 14,000 | 7 |
| Obuvshchik | Lida | Obuvshchik Stadium | 3,500 | 8 |
| Vedrich Rechitsa | Rechytsa | Rechitsadrev Stadium | 5,500 | 9 |
| Dinamo Brest | Brest | Dinamo Stadium (Brest) | 10,500 | 10 |
| Torpedo Mogilev | Mogilev | Torpedo Stadium (Mogilev) | 6,000 | 11 |
| Bobruisk | Bobruisk | Spartak Stadium (Bobruisk) | 4,800 | 12 |
| Shinnik Bobruisk | Bobruisk | Spartak Stadium (Bobruisk) | 4,800 | 13 |
| Shakhtyor Soligorsk | Soligorsk | Stroitel Stadium | 5,000 | 14 |
| MPKC Mozyr | Mozyr | Yunost Stadium | 7,500 | First league, 1 |
| Ataka-Aura Minsk | Minsk | Traktor Stadium | 25,000 | First league, 2 |

1. Two games played at Traktor Stadium.
2. One game played at Dinamo Stadium.

== Table ==
| Pos | Team | Pld | W | D | L | GF | GA | GD | Pts | Qualification or relegation |
|---|---|---|---|---|---|---|---|---|---|---|
| 1 | Dinamo Minsk (C) | 15 | 12 | 2 | 1 | 42 | 13 | +29 | 38 | Qualification for UEFA Cup qualifying round |
| 2 | MPKC Mozyr | 15 | 11 | 3 | 1 | 44 | 9 | +35 | 36 | Qualification for Cup Winners' Cup qualifying round |
| 3 | Dinamo-93 Minsk | 15 | 10 | 2 | 3 | 28 | 15 | +13 | 32 | Qualification for UEFA Cup qualifying round |
| 4 | Ataka-Aura Minsk | 15 | 8 | 5 | 2 | 26 | 7 | +19 | 29 | Qualification for Intertoto Cup group stage |
| 5 | Molodechno | 15 | 8 | 1 | 6 | 33 | 19 | +14 | 25 | |
| 6 | Dnepr Mogilev | 15 | 7 | 1 | 7 | 26 | 23 | +3 | 22 | |
| 7 | Dvina Vitebsk | 15 | 5 | 5 | 5 | 12 | 12 | 0 | 20 | |
| 8 | Neman Grodno | 15 | 6 | 1 | 8 | 20 | 35 | −15 | 19 | |
| 9 | Torpedo Minsk | 15 | 5 | 3 | 7 | 12 | 27 | −15 | 18 | |
| 10 | Dinamo Brest | 15 | 5 | 2 | 8 | 27 | 32 | −5 | 17 | |
| 11 | Torpedo Mogilev | 15 | 4 | 5 | 6 | 17 | 21 | −4 | 17 | |
| 12 | Obuvshchik Lida | 15 | 4 | 4 | 7 | 15 | 23 | −8 | 16 | |
| 13 | Shakhtyor Soligorsk | 15 | 4 | 4 | 7 | 12 | 20 | −8 | 16 | |
| 14 | Vedrich Rechitsa | 15 | 4 | 3 | 8 | 22 | 20 | +2 | 15 | |
| 15 | Shinnik Bobruisk (O) | 15 | 4 | 3 | 8 | 17 | 29 | −12 | 15 | Qualification to relegation play-offs |
| 16 | Bobruisk (R) | 15 | 0 | 2 | 13 | 6 | 54 | −48 | 2 | Relegation to Belarusian First League |

Source: rsssf.com
Rules for classification: 1st points; 2nd matches won; 3rd head-to-head
(C) Champions; (O) Play-off winners; (R) Relegated

=== Promotion/relegation play-off ===
Shinnik Bobruisk had to play two-legged play-off with First League runners-up Kommunalnik Pinsk. Shinnik won and both teams remained in their respective leagues.

| Team #1 | Agg. | Team #1 | 1st leg | 2nd leg |
|---|---|---|---|---|
| Shinnik Bobruisk | 3–2 | Kommunalnik Pinsk | 0–2 | 3–0 |

== Results ==
| Home \ Away | ATA | BOB | DBR | DMI | D93 | DNE | DVI | MOL | MPK | NEM | OBU | SHA | SHB | TMI | TMO | VED |
|---|---|---|---|---|---|---|---|---|---|---|---|---|---|---|---|---|
| Ataka-Aura Minsk | | 3–0 (Note: Bobruisk was awarded a technical loss for not showing up for the match.) | 3–1 | | | | | | 1–1 | | | 4–0 | 3–0 | | 0–0 | 1–0 |
| Bobruisk | | | 1–4 | | | | 0–0 | 0–7 | 0–5 | | 0–2 | | 0–4 | 0–0 | | |
| Dinamo Brest | | | | | | | 1–1 | 3–2 | 0–3 | | 1–1 | | 4–2 | 1–2 | 3–0 | |
| Dinamo Minsk | 0–0 | 6–1 | 5–2 | | | | 3–1 | 2–0 | | | 6–2 | 1–1 | | 5–1 | | |
| Dinamo-93 Minsk | 1–1 | 6–0 | 1–0 | 0–2 | | | | 4–1 | | | 2–1 | 1–0 | | 3–1 | | |
| Dnepr Mogilev | 0–0 | 5–1 | 4–3 | 0–1 | 1–3 | | | | | | 3–0 | 0–1 | | 3–2 | | |
| Dvina Vitebsk | 0–2 | | | | 0–1 | 1–2 | | | 1–1 | 2–0 | | | 1–1 | | 1–0 | 1–0 |
| Molodechno | 1–0 | | | | | 2–1 | 0–1 | | 2–1 | 1–3 | | | 6–1 | | 4–0 | 2–1 |
| MPKC Mozyr | | | | 2–1 | 2–2 | 1–0 | | | | 7–0 | | | 4–0 | | 3–1 | 3–0 |
| Neman Grodno | 0–4 | 3–0 | 2–3 | 2–3 | 2–0 | 4–1 | | | | | 1–0 | 1–0 | | | | |
| Obuvshchik Lida | 1–3 | | | | | | 0–2 | 1–0 | 0–3 | | | | 0–0 | 1–1 | 0–0 | 3–0 |
| Shakhtyor Soligorsk | | 2–1 | 3–1 | | | | 1–0 | 1–1 | 1–3 | | 1–3 | | | 0–1 | | |
| Shinnik Bobruisk | | | | 0–3 | 0–1 | 1–2 | | | | 3–1 | | 3–1 | | | 0–2 | 1–1 |
| Torpedo Minsk | 2–1 | | | | | | 0–0 | 0–4 | 0–5 | 1–0 | | | 0–1 | | 0–3 | 1–0 |
| Torpedo Mogilev | | 5–1 | | 0–2 | 1–3 | 2–1 | | | | 1–1 | | 0–0 | | | | 2–2 |
| Vedrich Rechitsa | | 2–1 | 2–0 | 1–2 | 3–0 | 1–3 | | | | 9–0 | | 0–0 | | | | |

Source: rsssf.com
Legend: Blue = home team win; Yellow = draw; Red = away team win.

== Belarusian clubs in European Cups ==
| Round | Team #1 | Agg. | Team #1 | 1st leg | 2nd leg |
|---|---|---|---|---|---|
1995 UEFA Intertoto Cup
| Group stage | Dnepr Mogilev (Belarus) | 2–1 | (Federal Republic of Yugoslavia) Bečej | 2–1 | |
| Group stage | Pogoń Szczecin (Poland) | 3–3 | (Belarus) Dnepr Mogilev | 3–3 | |
| Group stage | Dnepr Mogilev (Belarus) | 2–2 | (France) Cannes | 2–2 | |
| Group stage | Farul Constanţa (Romania) | 2–0 | (Belarus) Dnepr Mogilev | 2–0 | |
1995–96 UEFA Cup
| Preliminary round | Universitatea Craiova (Romania) | 0–0 (p) | (Belarus) Dinamo Minsk | 0–0 | 0–0 (aet, p.1–3) |
| First round | Austria Wien | 1–3 | (Belarus) Dinamo Minsk | 1–2 | 0–1 |
| Second round | Werder Bremen (Germany) | 6–2 | (Belarus) Dinamo Minsk | 5–0 | 1–2 |
1995–96 UEFA Cup Winners' Cup
| Qualifying round | Dinamo-93 Minsk (Belarus) | 2–3 | (Norway) Molde | 1–1 | 1–2 |

== Top scorers ==
| Rank | Name | Team | Goals |
|---|---|---|---|
| 1 | (Belarus) Sergey Yaromko | MPKC Mozyr | 16 |
| 2 | (Belarus) Pyotr Kachura | Dinamo Minsk | 15 |
| 3 | (Belarus) Valyantsin Byalkevich | Dinamo Minsk | 11 |
| 4 | (Belarus) Pavel Shavrov | Dinamo-93 Minsk | 10 |
| 4 | (Belarus) Maksim Romaschenko | MPKC Mozyr | 10 |
| 6 | (Belarus) Aleksandr Gavlush | Ataka-Aura Minsk | 7 |
| 6 | (Belarus) Vladimir Nevinsky | Dnepr Mogilev | 7 |
| 8 | (Belarus) Vitaliy Kozyak | Molodechno | 6 |
| 8 | (Belarus) Uladzimir Makowski | Molodechno | 6 |
| 8 | (Belarus) Yuriy Lagodich | Dinamo Brest | 6 |
| 8 | (Belarus) Vladimir Putrash | Shinnik Bobruisk | 6 |
| 8 | (Russia) Vladimir Solodukhin | Dnepr Mogilev | 6 |

== See also ==
- 1995 Belarusian First League
- 1995–96 Belarusian Cup
