= Valery Vyalichka =

Belarusian footballer and referee

Valery Vyalichka Валеры Вялічка
Personal information
- Full name: Valery Sigizmundavich Vyalichka
- Date of birth: 12 September 1966 (age 60)
- Place of birth: Brest, Belarusian SSR
- Height: 1.89 m (6 ft 2 1/2 in)
- Position: Forward

Youth career
- SDYuShOR-5 Brest

Senior career*
| Years | Team | Apps | (Gls) |
| 1984 | Dinamo Brest | 11 | (0) |
| 1985–1986 | Tekstilschik Baranovichi | 29 | (12) |
| 1987–1988 | Pedinstitut Brest | | |
| 1988–1990 | Dinamo Brest | 71 | (10) |
| 1991–1993 | Dinamo Minsk | 70 | (20) |
| 1993–1995 | Ironi Rishon LeZion | 16 | (3) |
| 1995 | Spartak Moscow | 2 | (0) |
| 1996 | Lokomotiv Nizhny Novgorod | 15 | (0) |
| 1996 | Cheonan Ilhwa Chunma | 2 | (0) |

International career
| 1992–1996 | Belarus | 4 | (0) |
- * Club domestic league appearances and goals as of 1 January 2009

Valery Sigizmundavich Vyalichka (Belarusian: Валеры Сігізмундавіч Вялічка; Russian: Валерий Сигизмундович Величко; born 12 September 1966) is a retired Belarusian professional footballer.

== Club career ==
He made his professional debut in the Soviet Second League in 1984 for FC Dinamo Brest.

== Referee career ==
After retirement he started a new career as a referee. Vyalichka is known to have officiated at international level during the period from 2002 to 2011.

== Honours ==
Dinamo Minsk

- Belarusian Premier League champion: 1992, 1992–93, 1993–94
- Belarusian Cup winner: 1992, 1993–94
