= Mikhail Smirnov (footballer, born 1967) =

Belarusian footballer

Personal information
- Full name: Mikhail Anatolyevich Smirnov
- Date of birth: 10 August 1967 (age 59)
- Place of birth: Minsk, Belarusian SSR
- Height: 1.76 m (5 ft 9 1/2 in)
- Position: Midfielder

Youth career
- 1984–1985: RUOR Minsk

Senior career*
Years	Team	Apps	(Gls)
1986–1988	Dinamo Minsk	0	(0)
1989	Navbahor Namangan	14	(0)
1989–1992	Dnepr Mogilev	104	(16)
1992	Zawisza Bydgoszcz	11	(1)
1993	Torpedo Moscow	2	(0)
1993	Dinamo Minsk	19	(1)
1994	SGV Freiberg	25	(12)
1995–1997	Stuttgarter Kickers	42	(1)
1997–1999	Eintracht Trier	19	(0)
1999–2000	TuS Montabaur	18	(2)
2000–2001	Pirmasens	21	(4)
2001	Sonnenhof Großaspach	13	(5)
2002	SpVgg Ludwigsburg	12	(2)
2002–2003	TSG Backnang 1919		
2003	Lokomotiv Minsk	3	(0)
- * Club domestic league appearances and goals

Mikhail Anatolyevich Smirnov (Russian: Михаил Анатольевич Смирнов; born 10 August 1967) is a Belarusian former professional footballer who played as a midfielder.

== Honours ==
Dinamo Minsk

- Belarusian Premier League: 1992–93, 1993–94
- Belarusian Cup: 1993–94
