= Lesun =

Lesun (Russian: Лесун, Belarusian: Лясун, meaning leshy, a human-like spirit of the forests) is a gender-neutral Slavic surname. It may refer to:

- Aleksander Lesun (born 1988), Belarusian-Russian modern pentathlete
- Anatoly Lesun (born 1959), Russian politician
- Gennady Lesun (born 1966), Belarusian football player
