= Pavel Radnyonak =

Belarusian footballer (born 1964)

Personal information
- Full name: Pavel Pyatrovich Radnyonak
- Date of birth: 30 July 1964 (age 62)
- Place of birth: Minsk, Belarusian SSR
- Height: 1.78 m (5 ft 10 in)
- Position: Defender

Youth career
- 1981–1983: Dinamo Minsk

Senior career*
Years	Team	Apps	(Gls)
1984–1992	Dinamo Minsk	140	(2)
1992	Veres Rivne	14	(0)
1993–1994	Dynamo-Gazovik Tyumen	60	(1)
1995–1997	Ataka-Aura Minsk	78	(2)
1998–1999	Dinamo Minsk	49	(0)

International career
1982	Soviet Union U18		
1983	Soviet Union U20		
1992–1996	Belarus	12	(0)

Managerial career
- 1999–2000: Dinamo Minsk (assistant)
- 2000: Dinamo Minsk
- 2000–2001: SKAF Minsk
- 2001–2002: Slavia Mozyr
- 2002–2003: Belarus (assistant)
- 2003–2009: Belarus U19
- 2006: Belarus (assistant)
- 2009–2011: Kazakhstan U21
- 2009–2011: Kazakhstan U19
- 2011: Rudensk (assistant)
- 2011–2013: Neman Grodno (reserves)
- 2015: BATE Borisov (youth)
- 2017–2019: Energetik-BGU Minsk (youth)
- 2019: Smorgon
- 2022–2023: Energetik-BGU Minsk
- 2023: Energetik-BGU Minsk (assistant)
- 2024: Ostrovets
- * Club domestic league appearances and goals

Pavel Radnyonak (Belarusian: Павел Раднёнак; Russian: Павел Роднёнок; born 30 July 1964) is a Belarusian professional football coach and a former player.

== Career ==
As a player, he made his professional debut in the Soviet Top League in 1984 for FC Dinamo Minsk.

== Honours ==
Dinamo Minsk

- Belarusian Premier League champion: 1992
- Belarusian Cup winner: 1992

== European club competitions ==
With FC Dinamo Minsk.

- UEFA Cup 1986–87: 1 game, 1 goal.
- European Cup Winners' Cup 1987–88: 4 games.
- UEFA Cup 1988–89: 4 games.
