= Genadz Lesun =

Belarusian footballer

Gennady Lesun
Personal information
- Full name: Gennady Nikolayevich Lesun
- Date of birth: 5 September 1966 (age 60)
- Place of birth: Minsk, Belarusian SSR
- Height: 1.87 m (6 ft 1 1/2 in)
- Position: Defender

Youth career
- 1984–1985: Dinamo Minsk

Senior career*
Years	Team	Apps	(Gls)
1985–1993	Dinamo Minsk	128	(11)
1993–1994	Maccabi Herzliya	35	(0)
1995–1996	Shimshon Tel Aviv	6	(0)
1997	Molodechno	22	(1)
1998	Anzhi Makhachkala	39	(0)

International career
1992–1994	Belarus	4	(0)

Managerial career
- 2005–2006: Lokomotiv Minsk (assistant)
- 2010: Partizan Minsk (assistant)
- 2013–2014: Dinamo Minsk (youth)
- 2015: Bereza-2010 (assistant)
- * Club domestic league appearances and goals

Gennady Nikolayevich Lesun (Russian: Геннадий Николаевич Лесун; born 5 September 1966) is a retired Belarusian professional footballer and currently a coach.

== Honours ==
Dinamo Minsk

- Belarusian Premier League champion: 1992, 1992–93, 1993–94
- Belarusian Cup winner: 1992
