= Yury Puntus =

Soviet-Belarusian footballer and coach

Personal information
- Full name: Yury Iosifovich Puntus
- Date of birth: 8 October 1960 (age 66)
- Place of birth: Tsivali, Minsk Raion, Belarusian SSR, Soviet Union
- Position: Forward

Team information
- Current team: Molodechno (manager)

Senior career*
Years	Team	Apps	(Gls)
1977–1979	Traktor Minsk		
1979–1980	Granit Mikashevichi		
1980	Lokomotiv Baranovichi		
1981–1986	Sputnik Minsk		
1986	Spartak Semipalatinsk	12	(4)
1992	Luch Minsk	2	(0)
1994	Samotlor-XXI Nizhnevartovsk	2	(0)

Managerial career
- 1987–1990: Sputnik Minsk (assistant)
- 1991–1992: Luch Minsk (assistant)
- 1993: Dinamo Yakutsk (assistant)
- 1994: Samotlor-XXI Nizhnevartovsk (assistant)
- 1995: Rybak Starodubskoye (assistant)
- 1996–2004: BATE Borisov
- 2000–2005: Belarus U21
- 2004–2006: MTZ-RIPO Minsk
- 2006–2007: Belarus
- 2007–2009: MTZ-RIPO Minsk
- 2009–2011: Dinamo Brest
- 2011–2013: Smolevichi-STI
- 2014–2017: Slavia Mozyr
- 2019: Belshina Bobruisk
- 2019–2021: Torpedo-BelAZ Zhodino
- 2022: Maxline Rogachev
- 2023: Naftan Novopolotsk
- 2023–2024: Maxline Vitebsk
- 2026–: Molodechno
- * Club domestic league appearances and goals

Yury Iosifovich Puntus (Belarusian: Юрый Іосіфавіч Пунтус; Russian: Юрий Иосифович Пунтус; born 8 October 1960) is a Soviet football player and a Belarusian football coach. He quit playing football in 1987 because of an injury. Puntus graduated from two universities: Belarusian Technological Institute (specialty – mechanical engineer) in 1983 and Belarusian State University of Physical Training in 1996.

== Managerial career ==
After working for a few seasons in Russian and Belarusian lower leagues' clubs, in 1996 Puntus was appointed as a head coach for newly reformed BATE Borisov. Puntus led the team to the Belarusian Premier League in just two seasons and eventually won two championship titles (in 1999 and 2002).

In 2004 Puntus joined MTZ-RIPO Minsk and led the team to winning Belarusian Cup in 2005. In January 2006 he was appointed as Belarus national football team head coach and later that year he left MTZ-RIPO to focus on national team's UEFA Euro 2008 qualifying campaign. In late 2007 he was sacked due to unsatisfying results and immediately rejoined MTZ-RIPO, before leading them to another Cup title in 2008.

In the following years Puntus coached Dinamo Brest (from 2009 to 2011), Smolevichi-STI (from 2011 to 2013), whom he led to the promotion from Second League to First League, and Slavia Mozyr, whom he joined in early 2014.

== Honours ==
As Coach

BATE Borisov

- Belarusian Premier League champion: 1999, 2002

MTZ-RIPO Minsk

- Belarusian Cup winner: 2004–05, 2007–08
