= Syarhey Herasimets =

Belarusian footballer and coach (1965–2021)

Syarhyey Hyerasimets Сяргей Герасімец
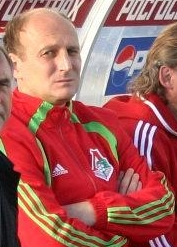
- Hyerasimets in 2007

Personal information
- Full name: Syarhyey Ryhoravich Hyerasimets
- Date of birth: 13 October 1965
- Place of birth: Kyiv, Ukrainian SSR, Soviet Union
- Date of death: 26 September 2021 (aged 55)
- Height: 1.76 m (5 ft 9 in)
- Positions: Attacking midfielder; forward

Youth career
- Dynamo Kiev

Senior career*
| Years | Team | Apps | (Gls) |
| 1983–1984 | Dynamo Kiev | 0 | (0) |
| 1984–1986 | Dynamo Irpen | 56 | (7) |
| 1986–1988 | Shakhter Donetsk | 50 | (4) |
| 1989–1993 | Dinamo Minsk | 94 | (24) |
| 1993–1996 | Bnei Yehuda Tel Aviv | 66 | (20) |
| 1997 | Baltika Kaliningrad | 13 | (5) |
| 1997–1999 | Zenit Saint Petersburg | 49 | (9) |
| 1999 | Žalgiris Kaunas | 5 | (2) |
| 2000 | Dynamo Saint Petersburg | | |
| 2001–2002 | Torpedo-MAZ Minsk | 32 | (5) |

International career
| 1992–1999 | Belarus | 25 | (7) |

Managerial career
- 2004: Severstal Cherepovets
- 2005: Tom Tomsk (assistant)
- 2006: Okzhetpes
- 2007: Lokomotiv Moscow (assistant)
- 2009: Dynamo Saint Petersburg (assistant)
- 2009–2010: Okzhetpes
- 2013: Piter Saint Petersburg
- 2014–2016: Tosno (youth)
- 2016–2017: Yunior Saint Petersburg
- 2017: Anzhi-Yunior Zelenodolsk
- 2018–2019: Junior Sevan
- 2020–2021: Yadro Saint Petersburg
- * Club domestic league appearances and goals

Syarhyey Ryhoravich Hyerasimets (Belarusian: Сяргей Рыгоравіч Герасімец; Russian: Серге́й Григорьевич Герасимец; 13 October 1965 – 26 September 2021) was a Belarusian professional football coach and player.

== Career ==
As a player, Hyerasimets made his professional debut in the Soviet Second League in 1984 for FC Dynamo Irpen. He scored the only goal in a 1–0 win for Belarus over the Netherlands in a Euro 1996 qualifying match in 1995.

== Personal life ==
His son is Ukrainian footballer Serhiy Herasymets, who as of 2017 plays for Ukrainian First League club MFC Mykolaiv.

== Career statistics ==
Scores and results list Belarus' goal tally first, score column indicates score after each Herasimets goal.

List of international goals scored by Syarhey Herasimets
| No. | Date | Venue | Opponent | Score | Result | Competition |
|---|---|---|---|---|---|---|
| 1 | 27 January 1993 | El Monumental, Guayaquil, Ecuador | Ecuador | 1–1 | 1–1 | Friendly |
| 2 | 12 October 1994 | Dinamo Stadium, Belarus | Luxembourg | 2–0 | 2–0 | Euro 1996 qualifier |
| 3 | 29 March 1995 | Bazaly, Ostrava, Czech Republic | Czech Republic | 1–2 | 2–4 | Euro 1996 qualifier |
| 4 | 7 June 1995 | Dinamo Stadium, Belarus | Netherlands | 1–0 | 1–0 | Euro 1996 qualifier |
| 5 | 12 November 1995 | Ta' Qali National Stadium, Ta' Qali, Malta | Malta | 1–0 | 2–0 | Euro 1996 qualifier |
| 6 | 12 November 1995 | Ta' Qali National Stadium, Ta' Qali, Malta | Malta | 2–0 | 2–0 | Euro 1996 qualifier |
| 7 | 7 June 1998 | Dinamo Stadium, Belarus | Lithuania | 2–0 | 5–0 | Friendly |

== Honours ==
Dinamo Minsk

- Belarusian Premier League: 1992, 1992–93, 1993–94
- Belarusian Cup: 1992, 1993–94

Zenit Saint Petersburg

- Russian Cup: 1998–99

Žalgiris Kaunas

- A Lyga: 1999

Individual

- Belarusian Footballer of the Year: 1993
