= Boris Tolkachyov =

Russian footballer

Personal information
- Full name: Boris Viktorovich Tolkachyov
- Date of birth: 1 August 1966 (age 60)
- Height: 1.83 m (6 ft 0 in)
- Position: Defender

Senior career*
Years	Team	Apps	(Gls)
1983–1984	Avangard Kursk	19	(0)
1987–1988	Avangard Kursk	52	(0)
1991–1992	Kuban Krasnodar	40	(0)
1993	Nyva Vinnytsia	8	(0)
1993–1994	Stroitel Vitebsk	5	(0)
1994–1998	Avangard Kursk	144	(2)
1999–2001	Magnit Zheleznogorsk		
2002	Don Novomoskovsk	11	(0)
2003–2004	Magnit Zheleznogorsk		
- * Club domestic league appearances and goals

Boris Viktorovich Tolkachyov (Russian: Борис Викторович Толкачёв; born 1 August 1966) is a former Russian football player.
