= Alyaksandr Mazhavoy =

Belarusian footballer

Personal information
- Full name: Alyaksandr Ivanavich Mazhavoy
- Date of birth: 20 October 1966 (age 60)
- Height: 1.91 m (6 ft 3 in)
- Position: Defender

Youth career
- SDYuShOR-5 Minsk

Senior career*
Years	Team	Apps	(Gls)
1983	Atommash Volgodonsk	5	(0)
1985–1986	Obuvshchik Lida		
1987	Torpedo Minsk		
1988	Dnepr Mogilev	31	(0)
1989–1990	KIM Vitebsk	36	(1)
1991–1993	Dnepr Mogilev	56	(0)
1993	Alania Vladikavkaz	4	(0)
1993	Lokomotiv Vitebsk	3	(0)
1993–1994	Stroitel Vitebsk	1	(0)
1994	Zorya-MALS Luhansk	3	(0)
1994–1997	Zawisza Bydgoszcz	33	(5)
1997–1998	R.C.S. Verviétois	6	(0)
1998–1999	Comblain Sport	22	(1)
- * Club domestic league appearances and goals

Alyaksandr Ivanavich Mazhavoy (Russian transliteration: Aleksandr Ivanovich Mozgovoy; Belarusian: Аляксандр Іванавіч Мазгавой; Russian: Александр Иванович Мозговой; born 20 October 1966) is a former Belarusian football player. He works as a children's coach in the academy of Standard Liège.
