= Samakhvalavichy (village) =

Samakhvalavichy Самахвалавічы (Belarusian)
- Village
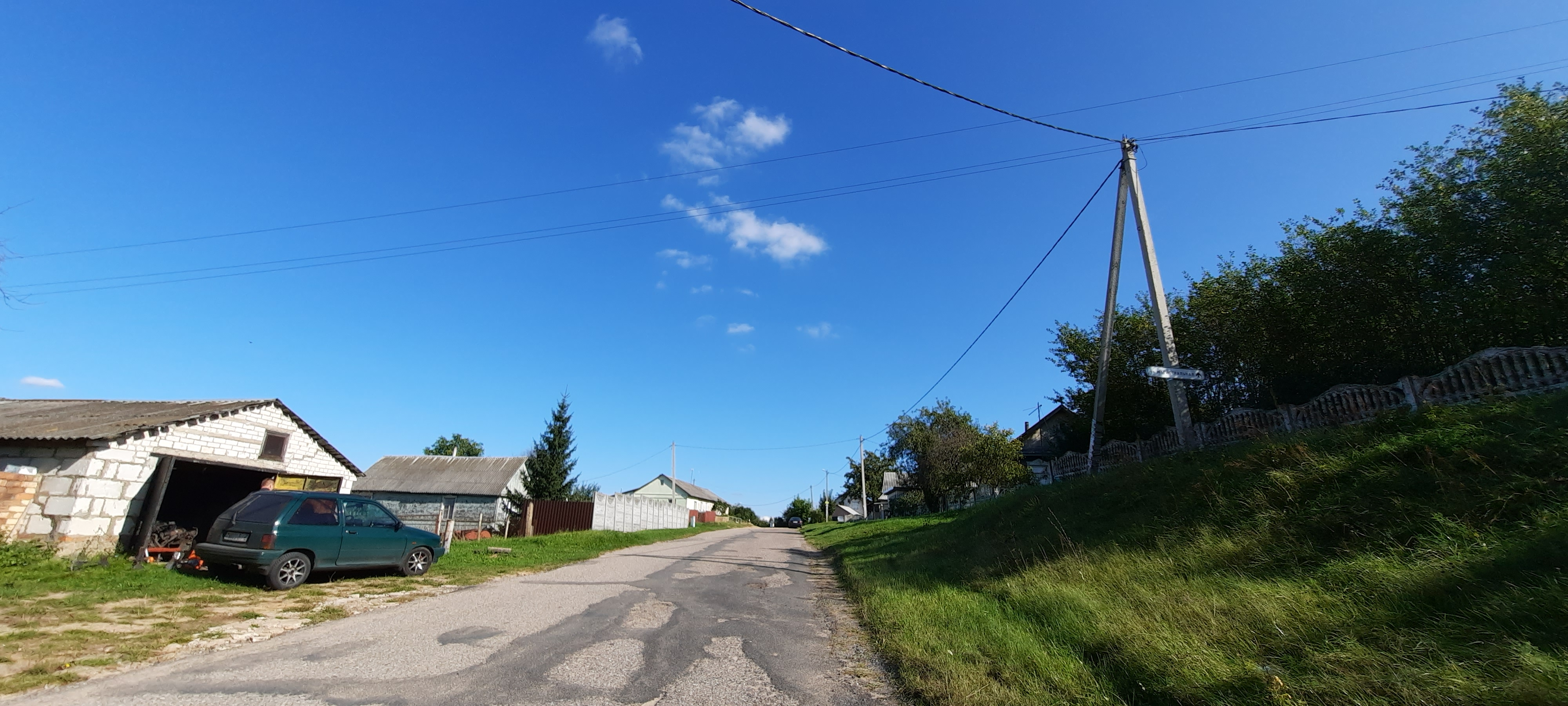

- Location within Belarus
- Coordinates: 53°44′18″N 27°31′30″E
- Country: Belarus
- Region: Minsk Region
- District: Minsk District
- Time zone: UTC+3 (MSK)
- Postal code: 223013

Samakhvalavichy (Belarusian: Самахвалавічы, romanized: Samachvalavičy; Russian: Самохваловичи, romanized: Samokhvalovichi) is a village in Minsk District, Minsk Region, Belarus. It is part of Samakhvalavichy selsoviet.
