= 1994–95 Belarusian Premier League =

Belarusian Premier League
- Season: 1994–95
- Champions: Dinamo Minsk (4th title)
- Relegated: Gomselmash; Lokomotiv
- UEFA Cup: Dinamo Minsk
- Cup Winners' Cup: Dinamo-93
- Intertoto Cup: Dnepr Mogilev
- Matches: 240
- Goals: 576 (2.4 per match)
- Top goalscorer: (Belarus) Pavel Shavrov (19 goals)
- Biggest home win: Dinamo Mn 7–0 Fandok (2 November 1994); Torpedo Mn 7–0 Lokomotiv (19 June 1995)
- Biggest away win: Lokomotiv 0–7 Torpedo Mn (30 October 1994)
- Highest scoring: Dinamo Mn 9–3 Gomselmash (19 June 1995)

The 1994–95 Belarusian Premier League was the fourth season of top-tier football in Belarus. It started 13 July 1994, and ended on 23 June 1995. Dinamo Minsk were the defending champions.

== Team changes from 1993–94 season ==
Stroitel Starye Dorogi, placed 16th last year, relegated to the First League. They were replaced by the 1993–94 First League winners Obuvshchik Lida.

Two teams changed their names during the winter break in the middle of the season. KIM Vitebsk were renamed to Dvina Vitebsk and Fandok Bobruisk to FC Bobruisk.

== Overview ==
Dinamo Minsk won the championship for the 4th time in a row and qualified for the next season's UEFA Cup, as the Champions League was limited to 24 highest-ranked European national leagues which didn't include Belarus. The first-time Cup winners Dinamo-93 Minsk qualified for the Cup Winners' Cup. Gomselmash Gomel and Lokomotiv Vitebsk, who finished on 15th and 16th places, were relegated. It was the last season for Lokomotiv in Premier League as they dissolved after playing in lower leagues for a few years.

== Teams and venues ==
Location of teams in 1994–95 Belarusian Premier League

Team	Location	Venue	Capacity	Position in 1993–94
Dinamo Minsk	Minsk	Dinamo Stadium (Minsk)	50,050	1
Dinamo-93 Minsk	Minsk	Traktor Stadium	25,000	2
Dvina Vitebsk	Vitebsk	Dinamo Stadium (Vitebsk)	5,500	3
Dnepr Mogilev	Mogilev	Spartak Stadium (Mogilev)	12,000	4
Bobruisk	Bobruisk	Spartak Stadium (Bobruisk)	4,800	5
Torpedo Minsk	Minsk	Torpedo Stadium (Minsk)	5,000	6
Shinnik Bobruisk	Bobruisk	Spartak Stadium (Bobruisk)	4,800	7
Dinamo Brest	Brest	Dinamo Stadium (Brest)	10,500	8
Molodechno	Molodechno	City Stadium (Molodechno)	5,600	9
Lokomotiv Vitebsk	Vitebsk	Dinamo Stadium (Vitebsk)	5,500	10
Neman Grodno	Grodno	Neman Stadium	14,000	11
Vedrich Rechitsa	Rechitsa	Rechitsadrev Stadium	5,500	12
Shakhtyor Soligorsk	Soligorsk	Shakhtyor Stadium	5,000	13
Torpedo Mogilev	Mogilev	Torpedo Stadium (Mogilev)	6,000	14
Gomselmash Gomel	Gomel	Central Stadium (Gomel)	10,250	15
Obuvshchik Lida	Lida	Obuvshchik Stadium	3,500	First League, 1

1. One game played at City Stadium in Lyuban, one game at Yunost Stadium in Stolbtsy.
2. Three games played at Dinamo Stadium, two games at City Stadium in Lyuban.
3. Three games played at Khimvolokno Stadium, one game at Torpedo Stadium.
4. One game played at Dinamo Stadium.
5. One game played at DYuSHh Stadium, one home game at Orbita Stadium in Minsk, one game at City Stadium in Lyuban.
6. One game played at Energetik Stadium in Novolukoml.
7. Last two games played at newly renovated Stroitel Stadium.
8. Two games played at Khimvolokno Stadium.

== Table ==
Pos	Team	Pld	W	D	L	GF	GA	GD	Pts	Qualification or relegation
1	Dinamo Minsk (C)	30	20	8	2	83	24	+59	48	Qualification for UEFA Cup preliminary round
2	Dvina Vitebsk	30	16	13	1	46	15	+31	45	
3	Dinamo-93 Minsk	30	16	10	4	52	22	+30	42	Qualification for Cup Winners' Cup qualifying round
4	Molodechno	30	12	11	7	48	30	+18	35	
5	Dnepr Mogilev	30	12	9	9	44	35	+9	33	Qualification for Intertoto Cup group stage
6	Torpedo Minsk	30	11	10	9	36	29	+7	32	
7	Neman Grodno	30	10	11	9	26	27	−1	31	
8	Obuvshchik Lida	30	10	10	10	32	36	−4	30	
9	Vedrich Rechitsa	30	10	8	12	24	33	−9	28	
10	Dinamo Brest	30	9	10	11	33	33	0	28	
11	Torpedo Mogilev	30	8	12	10	28	32	−4	28	
12	Bobruisk	30	8	12	10	31	36	−5	28	
13	Shinnik Bobruisk	30	7	9	14	31	50	−19	23	
14	Shakhtyor Soligorsk	30	5	10	15	22	41	−19	20	
15	Gomselmash Gomel (R)	30	6	6	18	26	59	−33	18	Relegation to Belarusian First League
16	Lokomotiv Vitebsk (R)	30	3	5	22	14	74	−60	11	Relegation to Belarusian First League

Source: rsssf.com
Rules for classification: 1st points; 2nd matches won; 3rd head-to-head
(C) Champions; (R) Relegated

== Results ==
Home \ Away	BOB	DBR	DMI	D93	DNE	DVI	GOM	LVI	MOL	NEM	OBU	SHA	SHB	TMI	TMO	VED
Bobruisk		6–1	1–1	0–0	0–2	0–0	4–2	3–0	0–1	0–1	3–1	2–2	1–1	0–0	0–3	1–0
Dinamo Brest	0–0		1–2	2–0	1–0	0–3	5–1	3–0	1–0	1–2	2–0	0–0	2–2	0–1	5–2	0–0
Dinamo Minsk	7–0	1–1		1–1	4–1	3–0	9–3	6–1	2–2	5–1	3–2	3–0	3–0	0–1	2–2	3–2
Dinamo-93 Minsk	2–1	2–1	1–1		1–0	0–0	1–0	1–0	3–1	1–4	5–1	0–0	4–1	3–0	3–0	3–0
Dnepr Mogilev	1–0	5–2	0–0	0–0		1–3	4–2	2–0	2–3	1–1	1–0	0–0	2–0	3–2	2–0	3–2
Dvina Vitebsk	2–1	1–1	0–0	1–1	0–0		4–0	1–0	4–1	2–2	1–0	3–0	2–1	2–0	2–0	0–0
Gomselmash Gomel	0–0	1–3	0–2	0–2	1–1	0–5		1–0	0–1	1–0	2–0	1–1	4–2	0–0	0–1	0–0
Lokomotiv Vitebsk	0–2	1–0	0–3	0–6	1–3	1–1	1–0		1–5	0–0	0–0	3–1	0–0	0–7	0–4	0–2
Molodechno	0–0	1–0	3–2	1–1	2–2	1–1	3–1	4–0		1–0	0–1	0–0	0–0	1–1	2–2	6–0
Neman Grodno	1–1	1–0	0–1	0–0	0–0	0–1	1–0	2–1	2–0		0–0	0–1	0–0	2–1	1–0	2–1
Obuvshchik Lida	1–1	0–0	0–4	3–2	3–2	1–1	3–0	4–1	0–0	1–1		1–0	2–1	1–1	1–0	1–0
Shakhtyor Soligorsk	1–2	0–1	1–2	1–0	1–3	0–1	1–0	1–1	0–3	1–1	1–3		3–2	2–0	1–1	0–1
Shinnik Bobruisk	1–1	0–0	0–2	2–3	1–0	1–2	3–4	2–1	0–5	2–1	1–0	3–1		0–0	0–0	1–0
Torpedo Minsk	0–1	0–0	0–4	0–4	2–1	0–0	1–0	7–0	2–0	2–0	1–0	2–2	3–1		0–0	2–0
Torpedo Mogilev	3–0	0–0	0–5	0–1	2–2	0–0	0–1	1–0	1–1	0–0	1–1	1–0	1–2	2–0		1–0
Vedrich Rechitsa	2–0	1–0	0–2	1–1	1–0	0–3	1–1	2–1	1–0	2–0	1–1	1–0	3–1	0–0	0–0	

Source: rsssf.com
Legend: Blue = home team win; Yellow = draw; Red = away team win.

== Belarusian clubs in European Cups ==
Round	Team #1	Agg.	Team #1	1st leg	2nd leg
1994–95 UEFA Cup
Preliminary round	Dinamo Minsk (Belarus)	6–5	(Malta) Hibernians	3–1	3–4 (aet)
First round	Dinamo Minsk (Belarus)	1–4	(Italy) Lazio	0–0	1–4
1994–95 UEFA Cup Winners' Cup
Qualifying round	Bobruisk (Belarus)	4–4 (a)	(Albania) Tirana	4–1	0–3

== Top scorers ==
Rank	Name	Team	Goals
1	(Belarus) Pavel Shavrov	Dinamo-93 Minsk	19
2	(Belarus) Yevgeni Kashentsev	Dinamo Minsk	18
3	(Belarus) Valyantsin Byalkevich	Dinamo Minsk	14
3	(Belarus) Pyotr Kachura	Dinamo Minsk	14
5	(Belarus) Sergey Vekhtev	Dvina Vitebsk	13
6	(Belarus) Andrey Skorobogatko	Dnepr Mogilev	12
7	(Belarus) Sergey Ulezlo	Shinnik Bobruisk	11
8	(Belarus) Yury Vyarheychyk	Dinamo-93 Minsk	10
8	(Belarus) Aleksandr Volovik	Torpedo Minsk	10
8	(Russia) Vladimir Solodukhin	Dnepr Mogilev	10
8	(Belarus) Sergey Yaromko	Bobruisk	10

== See also ==
- 1994–95 Belarusian First League
- 1994–95 Belarusian Cup
