= Samakhvalavichy rural council =

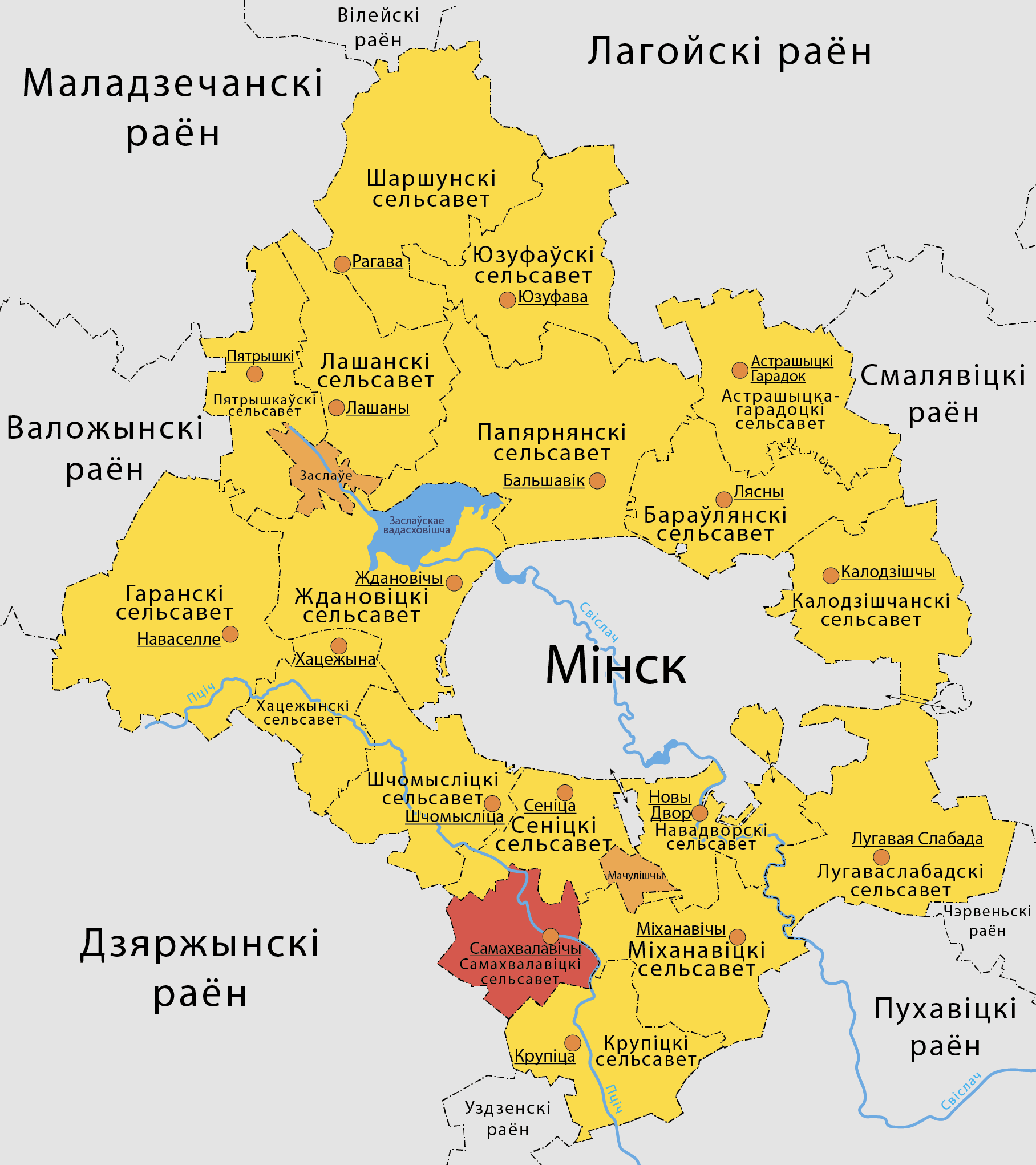
Map of Minsk District

Samakhvalavichy Selsoviet (Belarusian: Самахвалавіцкі сельсавет; Russian: Самохваловичский сельсовет) is a lower-level subdivision (selsoviet) of Minsk District, Minsk Region, Belarus. Its administrative center is the agrotown of Samakhvalavichy.

It includes the following populated places:

- Belitsa (village)
- Balitskovshchina (village)
- Vasilevshchina (village)
- Kurkovichi (village)
- Maripol (village)
- Rusinovichi (village)
- Samokhvalovichi (agrotown)
- Samokhvalovichi (village)
- Sloboda (village)
- Stukatichi (village)
- Timoshki (village)
- Ugly (village)
