= FC Slavia Mozyr =

Slavia Mozyr
- Full name: Football Club Slavia Mozyr
- Founded: 1987; 39 years ago
- Ground: Yunost Stadium, Mozyr, Belarus
- Capacity: 5,300
- Chairman: Andrey Vasilets
- Manager: Ivan Bionchik
- League: Belarusian Premier League
- 2025: Belarusian Premier League, 3rd of 16
- Website: fcslavia.by
Home colours	Away colours

FC Slavia Mozyr or FK Slaviya Mazyr (Belarusian: ФК Славія Мазыр, Russian: Славия-Мозырь) is a Belarusian professional football club based in Mazyr, Belarus.

== History ==
The team was founded in 1987 as Polessie (Polesia). Between 1987 and 1991, they played in the Belarusian SSR league. From 1992 till 1995, they played in the Belarusian First League. They changed their name to MPKC Mazyr since the 1994–95 season. MPKC stands for the Mazyr Industrial-Commercial Center. They won the First League the same year and made their debut in the Belarusian Premier League in fall 1995 season.

They finished second in 1995 and won the championship in 1996, becoming the first team other than Dinamo Minsk to win it. After changing their name to Slavia (Slaviya) in 1998, they again finished second in 1999 and won the title in 2000. After that, the results deteriorated and in 2005 they finished last and were relegated.

After the relegation, they had to merge with ZLiN Gomel in order for both teams to survive in any form due to financial problems. The new team went through a number of name changes before arriving with the current name, FC Slavia (Slaviya).

=== Name changes ===
- 1987: Founded as Palyessye Mazyr/Polesye Mozyr (Belarusian: Палессе, Russian: Полесье)
- 1994: Renamed FC MPKC Mazyr
- 1998: Renamed FC Slavia Mazyr
- 2006: Merged with ZLiN Gomel and renamed FC Mozyr-ZLiN/Mazyr-ZLiN
- 2007: Renamed FC Mozyr / Mazyr
- 2008: Renamed FC Slavia Mazyr

== Honours ==
- Belarusian Premier League
  - Winners (2): 1996, 2000
  - Runners-up (2): 1995, 1999
- Belarusian First League
  - Winners (3): 1994–95, 2011, 2018
  - Runners-up (3): 1992–93, 1993–94, 2014
- Belarusian Cup
  - Winners (2): 1995–96, 1999–00
  - Runners-up (2): 1998–99, 2000–01

== Current squad ==
As of 10 September, 2026

Note: Flags indicate national team as defined under FIFA eligibility rules; some limited exceptions apply. Players may hold more than one non-FIFA nationality.

No.	Pos.	Nation	Player
1	GK	BLR	Konstantin Veretynskiy
2	DF	BLR	Andrey Shamruk
3	DF	CMR	Ricky Ngatchou
4	DF	BLR	Ilya Rashchenya
6	MF	BLR	Yuliy Kuznetsov
7	MF	BLR	Nikita Romanov
8	MF	BLR	Ilya Kukharchik
9	MF	UKR	Oleksandr Batishchev
11	MF	BLR	Aleksey Antilevsky
13	FW	BLR	Andrey Solovey
14	DF	RUS	Denis Fedorenko
15	FW	BLR	Anatoliy Yarmolich
16	GK	BLR	Evgeniy Abramovich

No.	Pos.	Nation	Player
17	MF	BLR	Kirill Chernook
18	DF	RUS	Nikita Melnikov
19	MF	BLR	Aleksandr Derzhinskiy
20	FW	BLR	Ilya Verenich
21	FW	BLR	Yevgeny Shevchenko
23	GK	BLR	Uladzislaw Ihnatsyew
27	DF	BLR	Pavel Chikida
30	MF	BLR	Vitaly Likhtin
44	FW	BLR	Terentiy Lutsevich
49	MF	BLR	Aleksandr Dzhigero
88	DF	RUS	Dmitri Yashin
—	MF	BLR	Valeriy Senko

=== Out on loan ===
Note: Flags indicate national team as defined under FIFA eligibility rules; some limited exceptions apply. Players may hold more than one non-FIFA nationality.

No.	Pos.	Nation	Player
—	DF	BLR	Daniil Prudnik (at Ostrovets)
—	MF	BLR	Valentin Bondarenko (at Niva Dolbizno)
—	MF	BLR	Pavel Kotlyarov (at Slutsk)
59	MF	BLR	Nikolay Ryabykh (at Baranovichi)

No.	Pos.	Nation	Player
—	MF	BLR	Daniil Tsyk (at Ostrovets)
—	FW	BLR	Ivan Grudko (at Maxline Vitebsk)
—	FW	BLR	Nikita Yakimovich (at Ostrovets)

== League and Cup history ==
Season	Level	Pos	Pld	W	D	L	GF–GA	Points	Domestic Cup	Notes
1992	2nd	7	15	5	6	4	18–22	16	Round of 64	
1992–93	2nd	2	30	22	5	3	54–14	49	Round of 64	
1993–94	2nd	2	28	19	5	4	48–18	43	Round of 32	
1994–95	2nd	1	30	24	3	3	106–17	51	Quarter-finals	Promoted
1995	1st	2	15	11	3	1	44–9	36	Winners	
1996	1st	1	30	24	4	2	64–17	76	Winners	
1997	1st	6	30	12	7	11	39–30	43	Round of 16	
1998	1st	6	28	12	9	7	41–36	45	Quarter-finals	
1999	1st	2	30	20	5	5	74–25	65	Runners-up	
2000	1st	1	30	23	5	2	78–25	74	Winners	
2001	1st	7	26	13	5	8	49–27	44	Runners-up	
2002	1st	11	26	6	6	14	38–61	24	Quarter-finals	
2003	1st	14	30	6	7	17	29–64	25	Round of 16	
2004	1st	12	30	9	4	17	32–51	31	Round of 32	
2005	1st	14	26	2	5	19	14–60	11	Round of 16	Relegated
2006	2nd	4	26	11	10	5	44–24	43	Round of 16	
2007	2nd	13	26	4	6	16	26–44	18	Round of 32	
2008	2nd	13	26	6	5	15	33–62	23	Round of 32	
2009	2nd	13	27^{1}	5	8	14	23–41	23	Round of 32	
2010	2nd	9	30	10	7	13	33–44	37	Round of 16	
2011	2nd	1	30	22	5	3	53–15	71	Round of 32	Promoted
2012	1st	10	30	7	6	17	22–58	27	Round of 32	
2013	1st	12	32	5	8	19	24–47	23	Round of 16	Relegated
2014	2nd	2	30	18	6	6	55–38	60	Round of 16	Promoted
2015	1st	10	26	7	5	14	33–50	26	Round of 32	
2016	1st	10	30	9	8	13	33–49	35	Round of 16	
2017	1st	15	30	4	8	18	26–50	20	Round of 16	Relegated
2018	2nd	1	30	21	7	0	69–13	70	Round of 32	Promoted
2019	1st	8	30	10	7	13	35–40	37	Round of 16	

- ^{1} Including additional game (2–1 win) for the 13th place, which was necessary as Slavia-Mozyr gained the same number of points as Spartak Shklov while only one team should be relegated.

== Slavia in European Cups ==
Season	Competition	Round		Club	1st Leg	2nd Leg
1996–97	UEFA Cup Winners' Cup	QR	(Iceland)	KR Reykjavík	2–2 (H)	0–1 (A)
1997–98	UEFA Champions League	1Q	(Moldova)	Constructorul Chişinău	1–1 (A)	3–2 (H)
1997–98	UEFA Champions League	2Q	(Greece)	Olympiacos	0–5 (A)	2–2 (H)
1997–98	UEFA Cup	1R	(Georgia (country))	Dinamo Tbilisi	1–1 (H)	0–1 (A)
2000–01	UEFA Cup	1Q	(Israel)	Maccabi Haifa	1–1 (H)	0–0 (A)
2001–02	UEFA Champions League	1Q	(Faroe Islands)	VB Vágur	0–0 (A)	5–0 (H)
2001–02	UEFA Champions League	2Q	(Slovakia)	Inter Bratislava	0–1 (H)	0–1 (A)

== Managers ==
- (Belarus) Anatoliy Yurevich (1993–1997)
- (Russia) Aleksandr Bubnov (1997–1998)
- (Russia) Aleksandr Kuznetsov (1998–2000)
- Vlad Petrovich (1998–2000)
- (Belarus) Pavel Radnyonak (2001–02)
- Aleksandr Prazhnikov (2002–03)
- (Belarus) Vladimir Kurnev (2003–04)
- (Belarus) Andrey Sosnitsky (2004–05)
- Aleksandr Belan (2005)
- Ilia Karp (2005)
- Ihar Fralov (2006)
- Vyacheslav Shevchyk (2008)
- (Belarus) Sergey Yasinsky (2008–09)
- Vyacheslav Shevchyk (2009)
- (Ukraine) Vitaliy Pavlov (2009)
- (Belarus) Yury Maleyew (2010–14)
- (Belarus) Yury Puntus (2014–17)
- (Belarus) Mikhail Martinovich (2018–)
