= FC Vitebsk-2 =

Vitebsk-2
- Full name: Football Club Vitebsk-2
- Founded: 1990(KIM-2); 2012 (Vitebsk-2)
- Dissolved: 1996; 2014
- Ground: Vitebsky CSK (reserve ground), Vitebsk
- League: Belarusian Second League
- 2014: 9th

FC Vitebsk-2 is a Belarusian football club from Vitebsk. The club acts as a reserve team for FC Vitebsk.

== History ==
During Soviet era the team was known as KIM-2 Vitebsk, while the main was called KIM Vitebsk. Until 1991 KIM-2 played in Belarusian SSR League. In 1992 KIM-2 was included in newly created Belarusian First League, while their parent team KIM Vitebsk joined Belarusian Premier League . In 1994 KIM was renamed to Dvina Vitebsk and their reserve team to Kimovets Vitebsk. Midway through 1996 season Kimovets withdrew from the First League and was folded, while Dvina partnered with Lokomotiv Vitebsk to use them as a farm club.

Following the relegation to First League after 2011 season, FC Vitebsk decided to give their reserve squad competitive practice by re-creating a Second League reserve team under the name Vitebsk-2, as they were ineligible for participation in Belarusian Premier League Reserves Championship. This incarnation of Vitebsk-2 was active from 2012 till 2014.

== League and Сup history ==
Season	League	Pos.	Pl.	W	D	L	GS	GA	P	Cup	Notes	Manager
1992	2D	13	15	3	5	7	12	22	11	Last 32		
1992–93	2D	13	30	6	7	17	29	44	19			
1993–94	2D	10	28	7	9	12	26	40	23			
1994–95	2D	13	30	9	5	16	30	46	23			
1995	2D	14	14	2	3	9	9	28	9	Last 32	Withdrew?	
1996										Last 32		
