= Traktar Stadium =

Football stadium in Minsk, Belarus

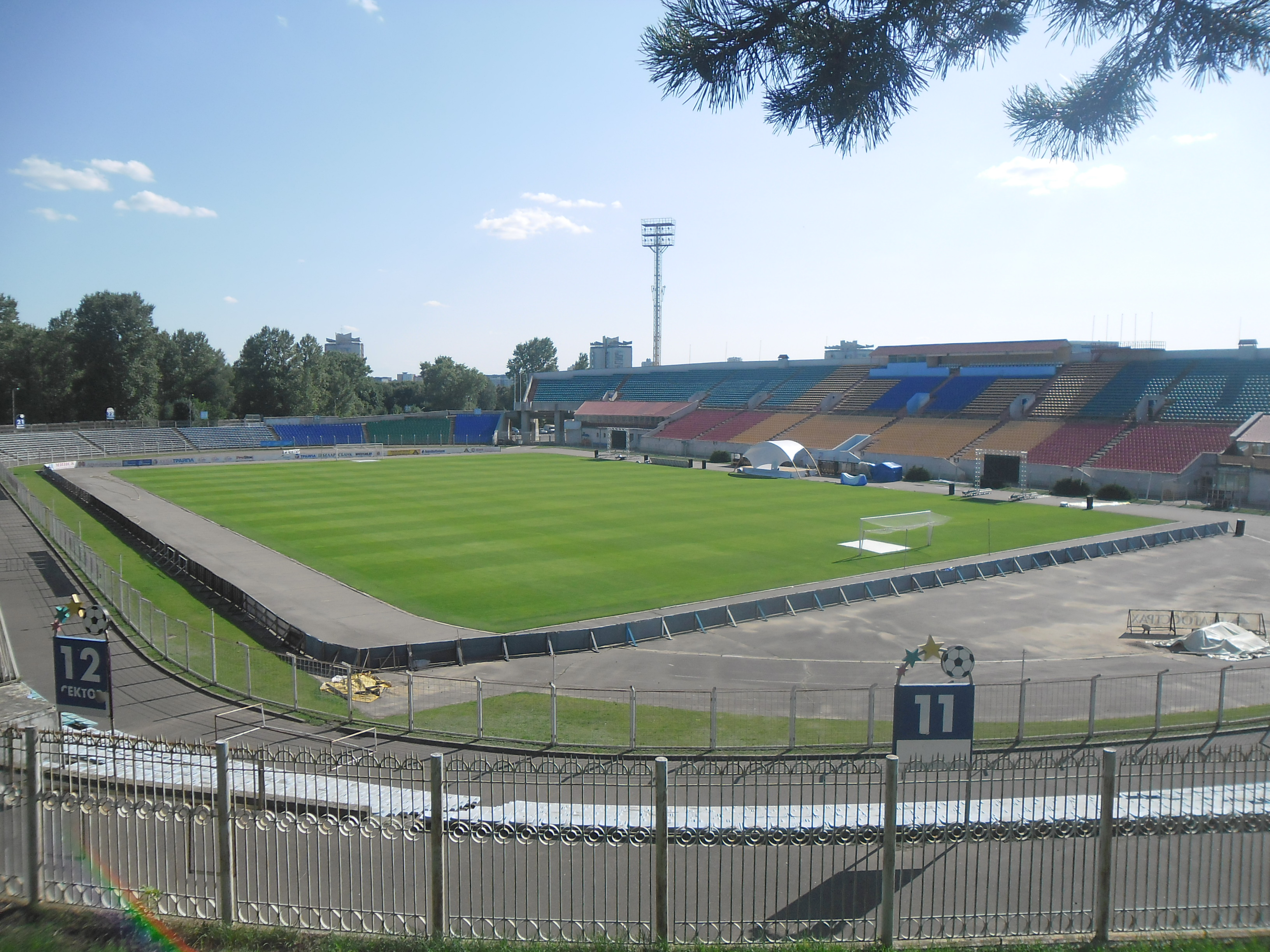
- Interactive map of Traktar Stadium
- Location: Minsk, Belarus
- Coordinates: 53°52′54″N 27°37′02″E
- Owner: City of Minsk
- Operator: FC Minsk
- Capacity: 5,703
- Surface: Grass

Construction
- Built: 1950s
- Renovated: 1976, 1997–2000, present

Tenants
- Traktar Minsk (1950s–1994, 1998–2001); Dinamo-93 Minsk (1993–1998); Ataka Minsk (1995–1997); Zvezda-BGU Minsk (2002–2005); MTZ-RIPO Minsk (2002–2011); FC Dinamo Minsk (1978–1980, 1997, 2013–2018); FC Minsk (since 2024)

Traktar or Traktor Stadium (Belarusian: Стадыён "Трактар", Russian: Стадион "Трактор") is a multi-purpose stadium in Minsk, Belarus. Home ground of FC Minsk since 2024.

== History ==
The stadium was built in the 1950s. Its original name was Krasnoye Znamya Stadium (Chyrvony Stsyah, Belarusian: Чырвоны Сцяг), before it was attached to Minsk Tractor Works and renamed as Traktor Stadium in 1976. During Soviet years the stadium was a home ground for Traktor Minsk in Belarusian SSR league as well as Dinamo Minsk reserves in the Soviet Reserves league.

In 1976, the stadium was renovated. During 1978–1980, it became a temporary home stadium for Dinamo Minsk senior team, while Dinamo Stadium was closed for renovation in preparation for the 1980 Summer Olympics football tournament.

In the 1990s, the stadium served as a home for several clubs, including Dinamo-93 Minsk, Ataka Minsk, as well as Dinamo Minsk in 1997 (while Dinamo Stadium was reserved only for international matches due to pitch condition). Second reconstruction started in 1997 and included installation of the fence and plastic seats.

In 2000s the stadium was shared between MTZ-RIPO Minsk and Zvezda-BGU Minsk. Traktor Stadium hosted a 2002 Belarusian Premier League decider match and in 2010–11 Belarusian Cup final. In the late 2000s, MTZ-RIPO Minsk then-owner Vladimir Romanov proposed a major renovation of the stadium and surrounding area, including building of a new modern stadium and an entertainment center, but the plan fell through after businessman's fall out with the club.

Since 2013, the stadium has been serving as a home for Dinamo Minsk once again, while their other ground Dinamo-Yuni Stadium is on a long term renovation.

== International use ==
Over the years the stadium has hosted some of UEFA Cup/UEFA Europa League qualifying rounds as well as UEFA Intertoto Cup home matches by Dinamo Minsk (2004, 2013–2016), MTZ-RIPO Minsk (2005–2009), Neman Grodno (2003) and Shakhtyor Soligorsk (2003). It also hosted occasional home games of Belarus national youth teams.

== See also ==
- FC Partizan Minsk
