= FC Luch Minsk =

- Full name: Football Club Luch Minsk
- Founded: 1983
- Dissolved: 1992
- Ground: Minsk, Belarus

FC Luch Minsk was a Belarusian football club based in Minsk.

== History ==
Luch was playing in lower Belarusian SSR leagues from 1987 to 1991 and spent one season in Belarusian First League in 1992. After the end of the season they disbanded.

Another club, unrelated to the old one, also named Luch Minsk, was founded in 2012.
