= FC Dinamo-93 Minsk =

Defunct association football club in Minsk, Belarus

Dinamo-93 Minsk
- Full name: FC Dinamo-93 Minsk
- Founded: 1992
- Dissolved: 1998
- Ground: Minsk, Belarus

FC Dinamo-93 Minsk (Belarusian: Дынама-93 Мінск; Dynama-93 Minsk) was a Belarusian professional football club based in Minsk. They were disbanded in 1998.

== History ==
Dinamo-2 Minsk was founded in 1992 as a reserve team for Dinamo Minsk, replacing Dinamo-d Minsk, which competed in Soviet Reserves Top League before the dissolution of the USSR. Dinamo-2 spent the 1992 season in Belarusian First League and won the tournament. In order to get promoted, Dinamo-2 separated from its parent and became an independent team. They were renamed to FC Belarus Minsk for the 1992–93 season and finally to FC Dinamo-93 Minsk in 1993.

FC Dinamo-93 Minsk was quite successful. They finished in second place once (1993–94) and three times in third place (1992–93, 1994–95 and 1995). They also won the Belarusian Cup in 1995 and reached the final 1997. Due to these results, Dinamo-93 were able to play in European Cups (Cup Winners' Cup in 1995–96, UEFA Cup in 1996–97 and Intertoto Cup in 1997).

In 1998, after the first half of the season, Dinamo-93 withdrew from the competition due to lack of finances and was disbanded.

=== Name changes ===
- 1992 (spring): founded as FC Dinamo-2 Minsk
- 1992 (summer): renamed to FC Belarus Minsk (Беларусь)
- 1993: renamed to FC Dinamo-93 Minsk
- 1998: disbanded

== Honours ==
- Belarusian Premier League
  - Runners-up (1): 1993–94
  - 3rd place (3): 1992–93, 1994–95, 1995
- Belarusian Cup
  - Winners (1): 1995
  - Runners-up (1): 1997
- Commonwealth of Independent States Cup
  - Runners-up (1): 1993

== League and Cup history ==
Season	Level	Pos	Pld	W	D	L	Goals	Points	Domestic Cup	Notes
1992	2nd	1	16^{1}	12	2	2	59–15	27	Round of 32	Promoted
1992–93	1st	3	32	20	6	6	54–24	46	Round of 32	
1993–94	1st	2	30	18	7	5	46–16	43	Round of 32	
1994–95	1st	3	30	16	10	4	52–22	42	Winners	
1995	1st	3	15	10	2	3	28–15	32	Semi-finals	
1996	1st	4	30	17	5	8	44–30	56	Semi-finals	
1997	1st	5	30	14	7	9	53–30	49	Runners-up	
1998	1st		15	4	6	5	19–23	18	Semi-finals	Disbanded, withdrew
1999									Round of 32	

- ^{1} Including the play-off game (3–0 win) for the first place against Shinnik Bobruisk, who had the same number of points at the end of the season.

== Dinamo-93 in Europe ==
Season	Competition	Round		Club	1st Leg	2nd Leg
1995–96	UEFA Cup Winners' Cup	QR	(Norway)	Molde	1–1 (H)	1–2 (A)
1996–97	UEFA Cup	1Q	(Moldova)	Tiligul Tiraspol	3–1 (H)	1–1 (A)
1996–97	UEFA Cup	2Q	(Sweden)	Helsingborg	1–1 (A)	0–3 (H)
1997	UEFA Intertoto Cup	Group 1	(Netherlands)	Heerenveen	1–0 (H)	
1997	UEFA Intertoto Cup	Group 1	(Poland)	Polonia Warsaw	4–1 (A)	
1997	UEFA Intertoto Cup	Group 1	(Germany)	Duisburg	0–1 (H)	
1997	UEFA Intertoto Cup	Group 1	(Denmark)	Aalborg	1–2 (A)	
