= 1993–94 Belarusian Premier League =

Belarusian Premier League
- Season: 1993–94
- Champions: Dinamo Minsk (3rd title)
- Relegated: Stroitel Starye Dorogi
- UEFA Cup: Dinamo Minsk
- Cup Winners' Cup: Fandok Bobruisk
- Matches: 238
- Goals: 513 (2.16 per match)
- Top goalscorer: (Belarus) Pyotr Kachura (21 goals)
- Biggest home win: Dinamo Mn 8–0 Shakhtyor (20 April 1994)
- Biggest away win: 0–3, 5 games
- Highest scoring: Dinamo Mn 8–0 Shakhtyor (20 April 1994)

The 1993–94 Belarusian Premier League was the third season of top-tier football in Belarus. It started on 17 July 1993, and ended on 18 June 1994. Dinamo Minsk were the defending champions.

== Team changes from 1992–93 season ==
Two teams that finished at the bottom of 1992–93 season table (Obuvshchik Lida and Torpedo Zhodino) relegated to the First League. They were replaced by the winners of 1992–93 First League Shinnik Bobruisk and the league was reduced from 17 to 16 teams.

Belarus Minsk changed their name to Dinamo-93 Minsk prior to the season.

== Overview ==
Dinamo Minsk won the championship for the 3rd time in a row as well as Belarusian Cup for the 2nd time and qualified for the next season's UEFA Cup, as the Champions League was limited to 24 highest-ranked European national leagues which didn't include Belarus. The Cup runners-up Fandok Bobruisk qualified for the Cup Winners' Cup. Stroitel Starye Dorogi finished in the last place and were relegated. It was their last season in Premier League to date.

== Teams and venues ==
Location of teams in 1993–94 Belarusian Premier League

Team	Location	Venue	Capacity	Position in 1992–93
Dinamo Minsk	Minsk	Dinamo Stadium (Minsk)	50,050	1
KIM Vitebsk	Vitebsk	Dinamo Stadium (Vitebsk)	5,500	2
Dinamo-93 Minsk	Minsk	Traktor Stadium	25,000	3
Neman Grodno	Grodno	Neman Stadium	14,000	4
Dnepr Mogilev	Mogilev	Spartak Stadium (Mogilev)	12,000	5
Fandok Bobruisk	Bobruisk	Spartak Stadium (Bobruisk)	4,800	6
Dinamo Brest	Brest	Dinamo Stadium (Brest)	10,500	7
Torpedo Mogilev	Mogilev	Torpedo Stadium (Mogilev)	6,000	8
Torpedo Minsk	Minsk	Torpedo Stadium (Minsk)	5,000	9
Gomselmash Gomel	Gomel	Luch Stadium	5,000	10
Shakhtyor Soligorsk	Soligorsk	Shakhtyor Stadium	5,000	11
Lokomotiv Vitebsk	Vitebsk	Dinamo Stadium (Vitebsk)	5,500	12
Molodechno	Molodechno	City Stadium (Molodechno)	5,600	13
Stroitel Starye Dorogi	Starye Dorogi	Stroitel Stadium	5,000	14
Vedrich Rechitsa	Rechitsa	Rechitsadrev Stadium	5,500	15
Shinnik	Bobruisk	Spartak Stadium (Bobruisk)	4,800	First League, 1

1. Two games played at Dinamo Stadium.
2. Two games played at Traktor Stadium, one game at Dinamo Stadium.
3. Two games played at DYuSSh Stadium.

== Table ==
Pos	Team	Pld	W	D	L	GF	GA	GD	Pts	Qualification or relegation
1	Dinamo Minsk (C)	30	24	4	2	76	20	+56	52	Qualification for UEFA Cup preliminary round
2	Dinamo-93 Minsk	30	18	7	5	46	16	+30	43	
3	KIM Vitebsk	30	17	9	4	32	14	+18	43	
4	Dnepr Mogilev	30	17	6	7	45	22	+23	40	
5	Fandok Bobruisk	30	13	7	10	32	25	+7	33	Qualification for Cup Winners' Cup qualifying round
6	Torpedo Minsk	30	9	15	6	18	18	0	33	
7	Shinnik Bobruisk	30	15	1	14	41	41	0	31	
8	Dinamo Brest	30	11	9	10	30	29	+1	31	
9	Molodechno	30	10	11	9	35	31	+4	31	
10	Lokomotiv Vitebsk	30	8	9	13	25	39	−14	25	
11	Neman Grodno	30	8	8	14	29	41	−12	24	
12	Vedrich Rechitsa	30	7	7	16	20	41	−21	21	
13	Shakhtyor Soligorsk	30	5	11	14	21	39	−18	21	
14	Torpedo Mogilev	30	5	10	15	20	43	−23	20	
15	Gomselmash Gomel	30	7	5	18	36	47	−11	19	
16	Stroitel Starye Dorogi (R)	30	3	7	20	13	53	−40	13	Relegation to Belarusian First League

Source: rsssf.com
Rules for classification: 1st points; 2nd matches won; 3rd head-to-head
(C) Champions; (R) Relegated

== Results ==
Home \ Away	DBR	DMI	D93	DNE	FBO	GOM	KIM	LVI	MOL	NEM	SHA	SHB	STR	TMI	TMO	VED
Dinamo Brest		1–2	0–1	1–3	1–2	1–0	0–1	0–0	1–1	1–1	2–0	1–0	1–1	3–0	0–0	1–0
Dinamo Minsk	3–0		0–1	3–1	4–1	3–2	1–0	5–1	3–1	4–1	8–0	4–1	4–0	1–1	2–0	4–0
Dinamo-93 Minsk	2–0	4–1		0–2	0–0	2–0	1–2	3–1	1–1	4–0	4–0	3–0	4–0	0–0	1–0	1–0
Dnepr Mogilev	1–0	0–0	0–1		1–0	4–1	2–0	6–0	2–1	2–1	0–2	0–2	3–0	1–1	3–0	4–0
Fandok Bobruisk	0–1	1–2	0–1	0–0		1–0	1–2	4–0	0–1	0–0	1–0	1–0	1–1	1–0	3–1	3–0
Gomselmash Gomel	4–2	1–1	1–2	0–1	2–0		1–2	0–3	1–0	3–1	1–2	0–1	3–1	0–2	4–0	2–0
KIM Vitebsk	3–0	0–0	1–0	2–1	0–0	2–1		1–0	2–1	2–0	2–0	1–0	0–0	0–1	3–0	2–0
Lokomotiv Vitebsk	0–0	0–2	1–0	2–0	1–2	3–1	0–0		1–0	1–3	1–1	3–0 (Note: Awarded as a 3–0 win for Lokomotiv due to Shinnik fielding a suspended player. Originally ended with a 0–0 draw.)	0–0	0–0	1–1	0–2
Molodechno	0–2	1–2	1–1	0–0	2–0	0–0	0–0	3–1		1–1	1–0	2–4	4–1	1–1	1–1	0–1
Neman Grodno	0–2	1–3	1–1	0–2	0–1	2–0	0–0	2–1	2–4		1–1	2–1	1–0	0–1	3–0	0–0
Shakhtyor Soligorsk	1–1	0–3	1–2	0–0	0–0	2–2	0–1	1–0	0–1	0–0		0–1	3–0	0–1	0–0	0–0
Shinnik Bobruisk	1–3	0–1	1–0	4–0	1–3	2–1	3–1	1–0	1–2	2–0	3–2		3–1	1–1	3–2	0–1
Stroitel Starye Dorogi	0–1	0–3	0–2	0–2	1–3	2–1	1–2	0–0	1–1	0–3 (Note: Awarded as a 3–0 win for Neman due to Stroitel fielding an unregistered player. Originally ended with a 1–1 draw.)	0–3	1–2		0–0	1–0	1–0
Torpedo Minsk	0–0	1–2	0–2	0–0	2–1	1–1	0–0	0–0	0–0	1–0	1–0	0–1	1–0		0–0	0–0
Torpedo Mogilev	1–3	0–2	2–2	1–2	0–0	1–1	0–0	0–2	0–2	2–0	1–1	2–0	1–0	1–2		2–1
Vedrich Rechitsa	1–1	0–3	0–0	0–2	1–2	3–2	0–0	1–2	1–2	1–3	1–1	3–2	1–0	2–0	0–1	

Source: rsssf.com
Legend: Blue = home team win; Yellow = draw; Red = away team win.

== Belarusian clubs in European Cups ==
Round	Team #1	Agg.	Team #1	1st leg	2nd leg
1993–94 UEFA Champions League
First round	Werder Bremen (Germany)	6–3	(Belarus) Dinamo Minsk	5–2	1–1
1993–94 European Cup Winners' Cup
Qualifying round	Lugano (Switzerland)	6–2	(Belarus) Neman Grodno	5–0	1–2

== Top scorers ==
Rank	Name	Team	Goals
1	(Belarus) Pyotr Kachura	Dinamo-93 Minsk / Dinamo Minsk	21
2	(Belarus) Sergey Yaromko	Shinnik Bobruisk / Fandok Bobruisk	19
3	(Belarus) Yury Vyarheychyk	Dinamo-93 Minsk	14
4	(Belarus) Vladimir Putrash	Shinnik Bobruisk	12
4	(Belarus) Miroslav Romaschenko	Dnepr Mogilev	12
4	(Belarus) Andrey Yusipets	Gomselmash Gomel	12
7	(Belarus) Alyaksandr Vyazhevich	Molodechno	11
8	(Belarus) Valyantsin Byalkevich	Dinamo Minsk	10
8	(Belarus) Yuri Shukanov	Dinamo Minsk	10
10	(Belarus) Syarhey Herasimets	Dinamo Minsk	8
10	(Belarus) Dmitry Klyuiko	Shinnik Bobruisk	8
10	(Russia) Vladimir Skorobogaty	Vedrich Rechitsa	8

== See also ==
- 1993–94 Belarusian First League
- 1993–94 Belarusian Cup
