= Samakhvalavichy =

Samakhvalavichy Самахвалавічы (Belarusian)
- Agrotown
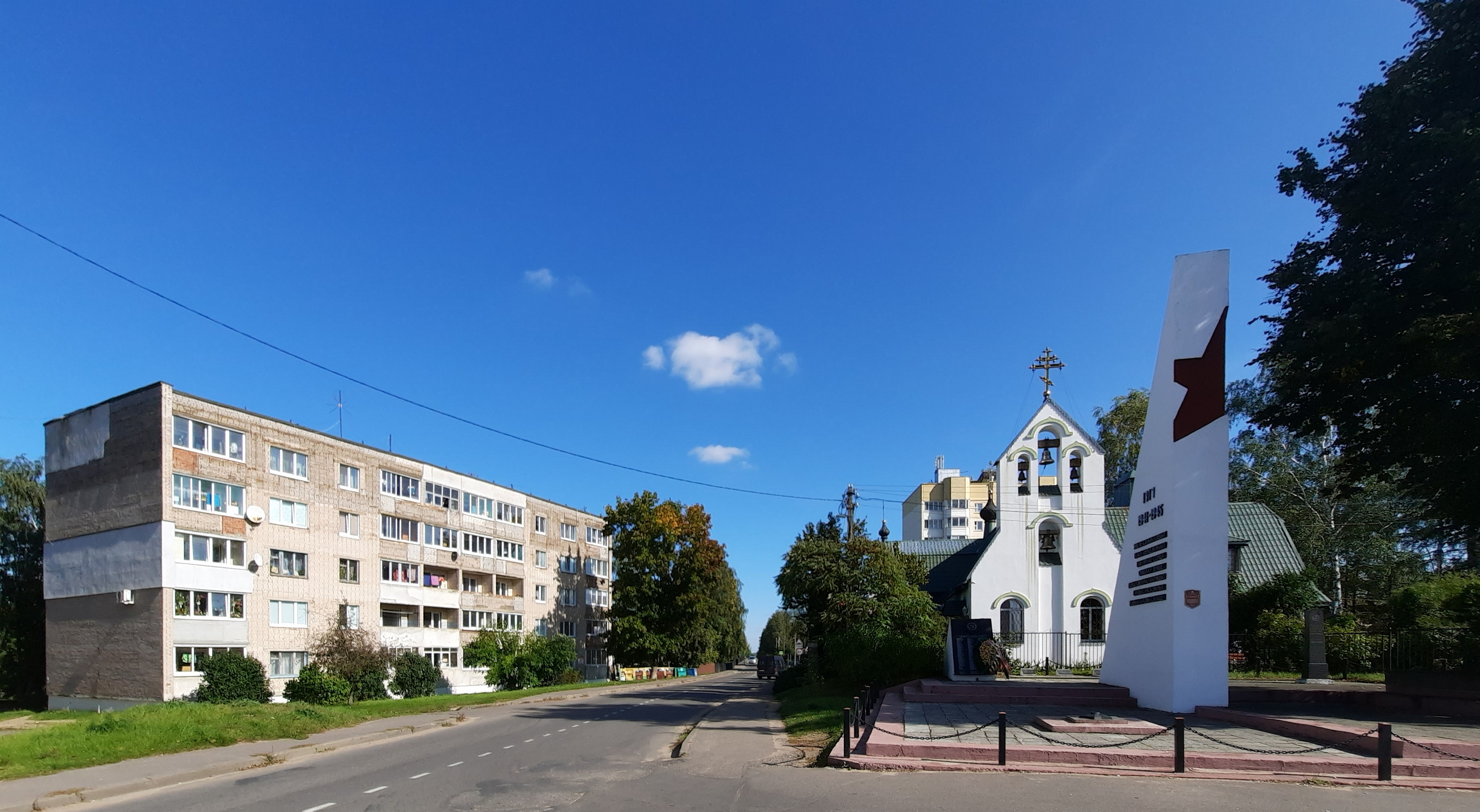
- Samakhvalavichy town center

- Location within Belarus
- Coordinates: 53°44′27″N 27°30′7″E
- Country: Belarus
- Region: Minsk Region
- District: Minsk District

Population (2023)
  - Total: 3,047
- Time zone: UTC+3 (MSK)
- Postal code: 223013

Samakhvalavichy (Belarusian: Самахвалавічы, romanized: Samachvalavičy; Russian: Самохваловичи, romanized: Samokhvalovichi; Polish: Samochwałowicze) is an agrotown in Minsk District, Minsk Region, Belarus. It serves as the administrative center of Samakhvalavichy selsoviet. As of 2023, it has a population of 3,047.

It stretches along the right bank of Ptsich river.

There is the Scientific and Practical Center for Potato and Fruit and Vegetable Growing of the National Academy of Sciences of Belarus (Russian: Научно-практический центр Национальной академии наук Беларуси по картофелеводству и плодоовощеводству) in Samakhvalavichy.

== History ==
At the beginning of the 18th century, the village of Samochwałowicze belonged to the Chalecki Polish noble family. Subsequent owners brought the property to waste and by the end of the 19th century miasteczko Samokhvalovichi was a predominantly Jewish shtetl with about 40 households and there was a nearby gentile village of 22 households and a folwark, all of the same name.

After the Second Partition of Poland, the area became part of the Russian Empire.

In 1919, it became part of the Byelorussian Soviet Socialist Republic.
