= FC Khimvolokno Grodno =

- Full name: Football Club Khimvolokno Grodno
- Founded: 1979
- Dissolved: 1995
- Ground: Grodno, Belarus

FC Khimvolokno Grodno was a Belarusian football club based in Grodno. The word 'Khimvolokno' means 'Synthetic Fibres' (literally 'chemical fibres'), and refers to the local Nylon 6 manufacturing plant.

== History ==
- 1979: founded as Olimp Grodno
- 1990: renamed to Veras Grodno
- 1992: renamed to Khimvolokno Grodno

The team was playing in Belarusian SSR league from 1979 to 1991 and in Belarusian First League from 1992 till 1995. In late 1995 Khimvolokno Grodno was disbanded.
