= FC Ataka Minsk =

Ataka Minsk
- Full name: FC Ataka Minsk
- Founded: 1986
- Dissolved: 1998
- Ground: Traktor Stadium, Minsk
- League: Belarusian Premier League
- 1997: 12th

FC Ataka Minsk (Атака) was a Belarusian football club based in Minsk. They disbanded in 1998.

== History ==
FC Ataka-407 Minsk was formed in 1986. In 1992 the team started playing in Belarusian Second League. In 1993, the team was renamed to Ataka-Aura. In the 1994–95 season, they played in the Belarusian First League and after finishing in 2nd place, they were promoted to the Premier League, where they played until 1997. After that season, the team went bankrupt and had to withdraw from the League.

Ataka's reserve team, Ataka-Aura-d Minsk started playing in the Second League since the 1994–95 season. After the main team withdrew from the Premier League and all of the main squad players left, the reserve team played one more season in the Second League in 1998 under the name Ataka-Sport Minsk and was disbanded as well.

=== Name changes ===
- 1986: formed as Ataka-407 Minsk
- 1993: renamed to Ataka-Aura Minsk
- 1994: reserve team formed as Ataka-Aura-d Minsk (Ataka-Awra-d, Belarusian: Атака-Аўра-д)
- 1997: main team renamed to Ataka Minsk and disbanded after the season; reserve team renamed to Ataka-407 Minsk
- 1998: reserve team renamed to Ataka-Sport Minsk and disbanded after the season

== League and Cup history ==
Season	Level	Pos	Pld	W	D	L	Goals	Points	Domestic Cup	Notes
1992	3rd	4	15	7	6	2	27–15	20	Round of 32	
1992–93	3rd	7	30	14	3	13	42–44	31	Round of 64	
1993–94	3rd	2	34	25	4	5	66–12	54	Round of 32	Promoted
1994–95	2nd	2	30	18	7	5	57–20	43	Round of 32	Promoted
1995	1st	4	15	8	5	2	26–7	29	Semi-finals	
1996	1st	6	30	13	5	12	31–42	44	Semi-finals	
1997	1st	12	30	8	6	16	29–44	30	Quarter-finals	Disbanded
1998									Round of 32	
