= FC Transmash Mogilev =

- Full name: Football Club Transmash Mogilev
- Founded: 1988
- Dissolved: 1998
- Ground: Transmash Stadium, Mogilev
- Capacity: 500

FC Transmash Mogilev was a Belarusian football club based in Mogilev.

== History ==
- 1988: founded as Selmash Mogilev
- 1994: renamed to Transmash Mogilev
- 1998: merged with FC Dnepr Mogilev to form Dnepr-Transmash Mogilev

Transmash (Selmash at the time) was playing in Belarusian SSR top league from 1988 to 1991, in Belarusian First League from 1992 till 1996 and in Belarusian Premier League in 1997. In early 1998 Transmash merged with another Mogilev team (FC Dnepr Mogilev) and FC Dnepr-Transmash was formed.

== League and Cup history ==
| Season | Level | Pos | Pld | W | D | L | Goals | Points | Domestic Cup | Notes |
|---|---|---|---|---|---|---|---|---|---|---|
| 1992 | 2nd | 4 | 15 | 6 | 5 | 4 | 25–14 | 15 | Round of 16 | |
| 1992–93 | 2nd | 3 | 30 | 12 | 13 | 5 | 48–20 | 37 | Round of 32 | |
| 1993–94 | 2nd | 4 | 28 | 17 | 5 | 6 | 47–26 | 39 | | |
| 1994–95 | 2nd | 11 | 30 | 9 | 8 | 13 | 30–31 | 26 | Round of 64 | |
| 1995 | 2nd | 7 | 14 | 6 | 4 | 4 | 20–16 | 22 | Round of 32 | |
| 1996 | 2nd | 1 | 24 | 14 | 7 | 3 | 47–13 | 49 | Round of 32 | Promoted |
| 1997 | 1st | 14 | 30 | 8 | 4 | 18 | 30–52 | 28 | Round of 32 | Merged with Dnepr Mogilev |
| 1998 | | | | | | | | | Round of 32 | |
