= FC Fomalgaut Borisov =

- Full name: Football Club Fomalgaut Borisov
- Founded: 1986
- Dissolved: 1996
- Ground: Borisov, Belarus

FC Fomalgaut Borisov was a Belarusian football club based in Borisov.

== History ==
- 1986: founded as Avtomobilist Borisov
- 1989: renamed to Berezina Borisov
- 1993: renamed to Fomalgaut Borisov

Avtomobilist Borisov was founded in 1986 in Borisov, Minsk Oblast. From 1987 until 1991 the team was playing in Belarusian SSR league. In 1989, they were renamed to Berezina Borisov. Since 1992 Berezina started playing in Belarusian Second League. In 1993 team was renamed to Fomalgaut Borisov due to sponsorship. In 1995 Fomalgaut was promoted to the First League. In the middle of 1996 season the club withdrew from the league and was dissolved.
