= Vitebsky Central Sport Complex =

Sports complex in Vitebsk, Belarus

Vitebsk Central Sport Complex
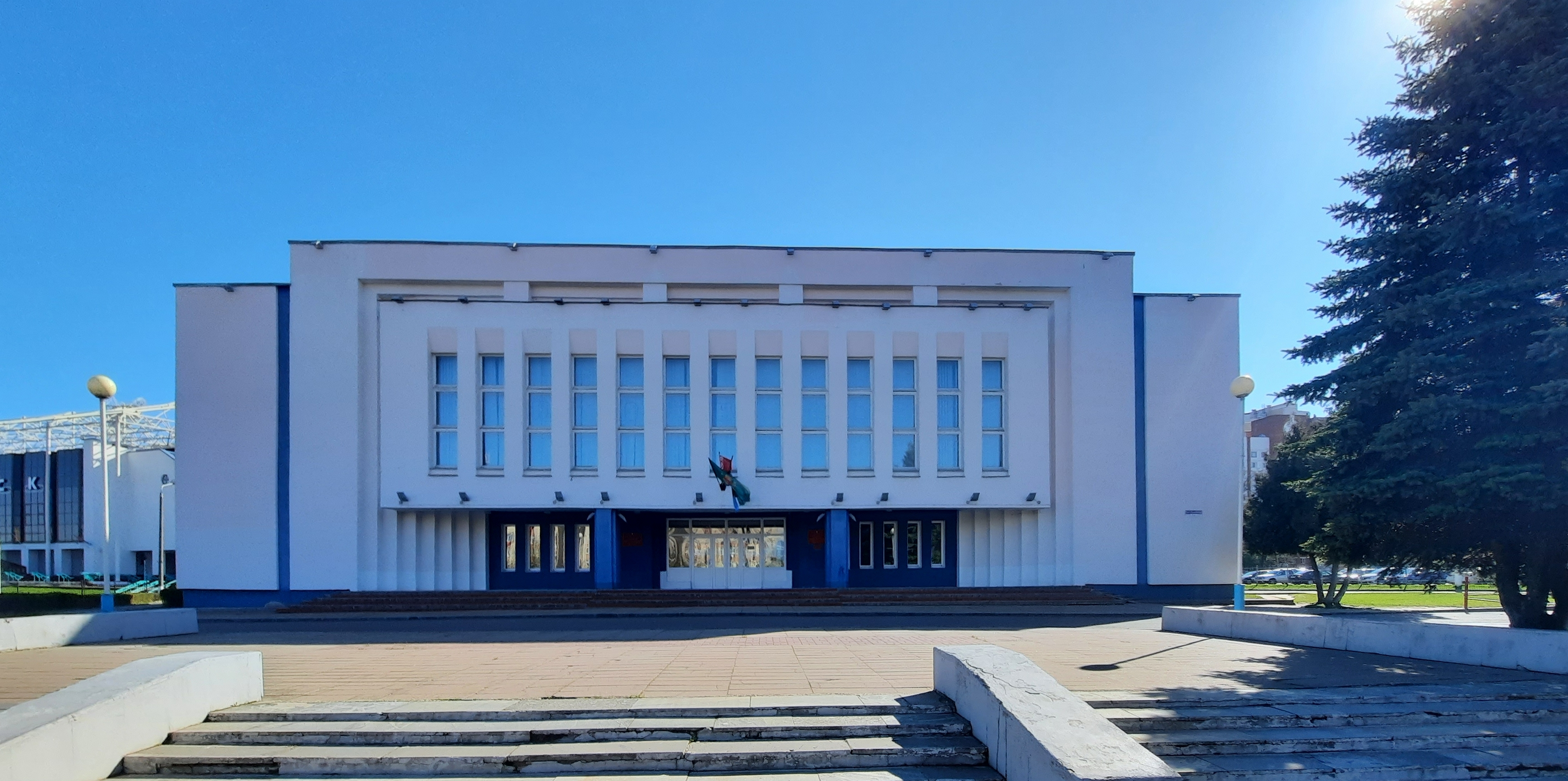
- Interactive map of Vitebsk Central Sport Complex
- Former names: Dinamo Stadium
- Location: Vitebsk, Belarus
- Coordinates: 55°11′54″N 30°13′45″E
- Owner: City of Vitebsk
- Capacity: 8,144
- Surface: Grass
- Field size: 105 m × 68 m (344 ft × 223 ft)

Construction
- Opened: 1937
- Renovated: 1950, 1980–1986, 1998–2003

Tenants
- Vitebsk; Lokomotiv Vitebsk (1993–1997); Maxline Vitebsk

Vitebsk Central Sport Complex (Belarusian: Віцебскі цэнтральны спартыўны комплекс, romanized: Viciebski centraĺny spartyŭny komplieks, also known as Vitebsky CSK / Vitsyebski CSK) is a multi-use sports complex in Vitebsk, Belarus. It is currently used mostly for football matches. The stadium holds 8,144 people.

== History ==
The stadium was built in 1937 and was originally known as Dinamo Stadium (Belarusian: Дынама, romanized: Dynama). In 1950, it was rebuilt after damage sustained during the World War II. In 2002, it was chosen to host a final match of the 2001–02 Belarusian Cup. In 2003, the renovation was completed and the arena was renamed to Vitebsky (Vitebsk) Central Sport Complex.

== International use ==
The stadium hosted occasional home games of Belarus national under-21 team. In 2005, it hosted Belarus national team's friendly match against Latvia. It also was used by Naftan Novopolotsk as a home venue in UEFA Europa League qualifiers in 2009 and 2012.
