= 1992–93 Belarusian Premier League =

Belarusian Premier League
- Season: 1992–93
- Champions: Dinamo Minsk (2nd title)
- Relegated: Obuvshchik Lida; Torpedo Zhodino
- Champions League: Dinamo Minsk
- Cup Winners' Cup: Neman Grodno
- Matches played: 270
- Goals scored: 610 (2.26 per match)
- Top goalscorer: (Belarus) Sergey Baranovsky (19 goals)
- Biggest home win: Belarus 8–1 Torpedo Zh (6 Sep 1992)
- Biggest away win: Neman 1–5 Dinamo Mn (17 Sep 1992); Torpedo Mg 0–4 Molodechno (12 Apr 1993)
- Highest scoring: Lokomotiv 7–4 Molodechno (27 Aug 1992)

The 1992–93 Belarusian Premier League was the second season of top-tier football in Belarus. It started on 1 August 1992 and ended on 17 June 1993. Dinamo Minsk were the defending champions.

== Team changes from 1992 season ==
No team has relegated after 1992 season. The winners of 1992 Belarusian First League (Dinamo-2 Minsk) were promoted and the league was expanded to 17 teams for one season only.

In order to play in Premier League, Dinamo-2 Minsk split from their parent team Dinamo Minsk into separate football club (although both teams remained the parts of the same organization) and changed their name to Belarus Minsk.

SKB-Lokomotiv Vitebsk changed their name to Lokomotiv Vitebsk prior to the season. Another four clubs changed their names during the winter break (Traktor Bobruisk to Fandok Bobruisk, Khimik Grodno to Neman Grodno, BelAZ Zhodino to Torpedo Zhodino and Metallurg Molodechno to FC Molodechno).

== Overview ==
Dinamo Minsk won their 2nd champions title and qualified for the next season's Champions League. 1992–93 cup winners Neman Grodno qualified for the Cup Winners' Cup. Obuvshchik Lida and Torpedo Zhodino relegated to the First League.

== Teams and venues ==
Location of teams in 1992–93 Belarusian Premier League

| Team | Location | Venue | Capacity | Position in 1992 |
|---|---|---|---|---|
| Dinamo Minsk | Minsk | Dinamo Stadium (Minsk) | 50,050 | 1 |
| Dnepr Mogilev | Mogilev | Spartak Stadium (Mogilev) | 12,000 | 2 |
| Dinamo Brest | Brest | Dinamo Stadium (Brest) | 10,500 | 3 |
| Fandok Bobruisk | Bobruisk | Spartak Stadium (Bobruisk) | 4,000 | 4 |
| Neman Grodno | Grodno | Neman Stadium | 14,000 | 5 |
| KIM Vitebsk | Vitebsk | Dinamo Stadium (Vitebsk) | 5,500 | 6 |
| Torpedo Mogilev | Mogilev | Torpedo Stadium (Mogilev) | 6,000 | 7 |
| Vedrich Rechitsa | Rechitsa | Rechitsadrev Stadium | 4,000 | 8 |
| Molodechno | Molodechno | City Stadium (Molodechno) | 5,600 | 9 |
| Torpedo Minsk | Minsk | Torpedo Stadium (Minsk) | 5,000 | 10 |
| Shakhtyor Soligorsk | Soligorsk | Shakhtyor Stadium | 5,000 | 11 |
| Obuvshchik Lida | Lida | Obuvshchik Stadium | 3,500 | 12 |
| Torpedo Zhodino | Zhodino | Torpedo Stadium (Zhodino) | 5,500 | 13 |
| Stroitel Starye Dorogi | Starye Dorogi | Stroitel Stadium | 5,000 | 14 |
| Lokomotiv Vitebsk | Vitebsk | Dinamo Stadium (Vitebsk) | 5,500 | 15 |
| Gomselmash Gomel | Gomel | Gomselmash Stadium | 5,000 | 16 |
| Belarus Minsk | Minsk | Dinamo Stadium (Minsk) | 50,050 | First League, 1 |

Due to bad pitch conditions, scheduling conflicts and other reasons several games were played at other venues.

1. Two games played at Yunost Stadium in Stolbtsy, one game at Olympic Center in Stayki, one game at City Stadium in Molodechno.
2. One game played at Khimvolokno Stadium.
3. Two games played at City stadium in Luzhesno.
4. Two games played at Urozhay Stadium in Belynichi.
5. Two games played at Traktor Stadium in Minsk, one game at Olympic Center in Stayki.
6. Two games played at Olympic Center in Stayki.
7. One game played at Sluch Stadium in Starobin.
8. One game played at Gorsportkomitet stadium.
9. One game played at Aresa Stadium in Gorki.
10. All eight games of the fall part of the season played at Lyos Stadium (capacity 3,000) in Baran. In the spring, three games played at City stadium in Dolzha and one game at City Stadium in Orsha.
11. Last seven games played at Luch Stadium (capacity 5,000).
12. Four games played at Traktor Stadium, two games at Yunost Stadium in Stolbtsy, one game at Meliorator Stadium in Derevnoye.

== Table ==
| Pos | Team | Pld | W | D | L | GF | GA | GD | Pts | Qualification or relegation |
|---|---|---|---|---|---|---|---|---|---|---|
| 1 | Dinamo Minsk (C) | 32 | 26 | 5 | 1 | 90 | 25 | +65 | 57 | Qualification for Champions League first round |
| 2 | KIM Vitebsk | 32 | 18 | 11 | 3 | 55 | 21 | +34 | 47 | |
| 3 | Belarus Minsk | 32 | 20 | 6 | 6 | 54 | 24 | +30 | 46 | |
| 4 | Neman Grodno | 32 | 18 | 9 | 5 | 39 | 27 | +12 | 45 | Qualification for Cup Winners' Cup qualifying round |
| 5 | Dnepr Mogilev | 32 | 17 | 7 | 8 | 54 | 33 | +21 | 41 | |
| 6 | Fandok Bobruisk | 32 | 15 | 10 | 7 | 37 | 20 | +17 | 40 | |
| 7 | Dinamo Brest | 32 | 13 | 9 | 10 | 33 | 29 | +4 | 35 | |
| 8 | Torpedo Mogilev | 32 | 10 | 13 | 9 | 35 | 30 | +5 | 33 | |
| 9 | Torpedo Minsk | 32 | 10 | 10 | 12 | 29 | 33 | −4 | 30 | |
| 10 | Gomselmash Gomel | 32 | 9 | 8 | 15 | 23 | 40 | −17 | 26 | |
| 11 | Shakhtyor Soligorsk | 32 | 8 | 10 | 14 | 19 | 34 | −15 | 26 | |
| 12 | Lokomotiv Vitebsk | 32 | 7 | 11 | 14 | 27 | 40 | −13 | 25 | |
| 13 | Molodechno | 32 | 7 | 10 | 15 | 34 | 40 | −6 | 24 | |
| 14 | Stroitel Starye Dorogi | 32 | 7 | 9 | 16 | 21 | 42 | −21 | 23 | |
| 15 | Vedrich Rechitsa | 32 | 7 | 7 | 18 | 30 | 61 | −31 | 21 | |
| 16 | Obuvshchik Lida (R) | 32 | 4 | 9 | 19 | 15 | 45 | −30 | 17 | Relegation to Belarusian First League |
| 17 | Torpedo Zhodino (R) | 32 | 2 | 4 | 26 | 17 | 68 | −51 | 8 | Relegation to Belarusian First League |

Source: rsssf.com
Rules for classification: 1st points; 2nd matches won; 3rd head-to-head
(C) Champions; (R) Relegated

== Results ==
| Home \ Away | BMI | DBR | DMI | DNE | FBO | GOM | KIM | LVI | MOL | NEM | OBU | SHA | STR | TMI | TMO | TZH | VED |
|---|---|---|---|---|---|---|---|---|---|---|---|---|---|---|---|---|---|
| Belarus Minsk | | 1–2 | 2–2 | 2–0 | 3–0 | 0–0 | 2–2 | 2–1 | 2–1 | 0–0 | 1–0 | 2–1 | 4–0 | 2–0 | 0–1 | 8–1 | 1–0 |
| Dinamo Brest | 2–1 | | 0–3 | 0–1 | 1–0 | 1–0 | 1–1 | 2–0 | 1–1 | 1–2 | 5–0 | 1–0 | 1–0 | 0–0 | 1–0 | 2–1 | 4–0 |
| Dinamo Minsk | 1–0 | 3–0 | | 4–0 | 1–0 | 3–1 | 2–0 | 1–0 | 2–2 | 1–1 | 4–0 | 2–0 | 6–0 | 2–0 | 2–1 | 5–0 | 6–1 |
| Dnepr Mogilev | 0–1 | 1–0 | 1–2 | | 0–0 | 3–1 | 1–3 | 2–2 | 0–0 | 1–1 | 3–0 | 4–1 | 4–1 | 3–2 | 1–1 | 3–1 | 5–0 |
| Fandok Bobruisk | 0–1 | 1–0 | 3–2 | 2–0 | | 7–0 | 1–1 | 0–0 | 3–0 | 0–0 | 1–0 | 0–0 | 1–1 | 1–0 | 2–1 | 2–0 | 2–0 |
| Gomselmash Gomel | 1–3 | 0–1 | 0–3 | 1–1 | 0–2 | | 1–3 | 0–0 | 0–0 | 0–1 | 1–2 | 1–0 | 1–0 | 0–1 | 3–0 | 3–1 | 1–0 |
| KIM Vitebsk | 1–1 | 1–1 | 1–2 | 3–1 | 1–0 | 1–0 | | 2–0 | 1–0 | 3–1 | 4–0 | 3–1 | 4–0 | 0–0 | 0–0 | 3–0 | 3–0 |
| Lokomotiv Vitebsk | 0–2 | 1–1 | 2–4 | 2–1 | 0–0 | 0–0 | 0–2 | | 7–4 | 1–3 | 1–0 | 0–1 | 0–0 | 1–1 | 0–2 | 0–2 | 2–1 |
| Molodechno | 1–3 | 0–0 | 1–3 | 0–2 | 1–2 | 0–1 | 1–2 | 0–0 | | 3–1 | 2–1 | 0–1 | 2–0 | 0–3 | 0–0 | 1–0 | 5–0 |
| Neman Grodno | 1–0 | 1–0 | 1–5 | 1–1 | 4–1 | 0–0 | 1–0 | 2–0 | 2–1 | | 1–0 | 1–1 | 2–1 | 0–0 (Note: Awarded as a technical win (+:-) for Neman (Khimik) due to extra 5th substition performed by Torpedo Minsk (while only 4 were allowed). Originally ended with a 2–0 win for Torpedo.) | 1–0 | 4–0 | 2–1 |
| Obuvshchik Lida | 0–1 | 1–1 | 2–4 | 0–1 | 0–0 | 3–0 | 0–0 | 1–1 | 0–0 | 1–1 | | 0–0 | 0–1 | 0–1 | 0–0 | 2–1 | 1–1 |
| Shakhtyor Soligorsk | 1–2 | 1–1 | 1–4 | 0–1 | 0–2 | 1–0 | 0–3 | 0–1 | 1–0 | 2–0 | 1–0 | | 0–0 | 1–1 | 0–0 | 0–0 | 2–1 |
| Stroitel Starye Dorogi | 0–1 | 0–0 | 1–1 | 0–2 | 0–2 | 0–2 | 1–1 | 2–0 | 0–0 | 2–0 | 2–0 | 0–0 | | 0–1 | 2–2 | 1–2 | 5–0 |
| Torpedo Minsk | 1–2 | 1–0 | 1–3 | 0–3 | 0–0 | 3–3 | 0–2 | 2–0 | 0–0 | 0–1 | 1–0 | 0–0 | 2–0 | | 2–0 | 1–0 | 1–1 |
| Torpedo Mogilev | 1–0 | 2–0 | 1–1 | 1–3 | 2–0 | 0–0 | 1–1 | 0–0 | 0–4 | 1–1 | 3–0 | 2–1 | 0–0 (Note: Awarded as a technical win (+:-) for Stroilel due to Torpedo Mogilev fielding a suspended player. Originally ended with a 0–0 draw.) | 3–1 | | 4–0 | 4–2 |
| Torpedo Zhodino | 1–2 | 0–2 | 0–1 | 1–3 | 0–1 | 0–1 | 2–3 | 0–3 | 1–4 | 0–1 | 0–1 | 0–1 | 0–1 | 1–1 | 2–2 | | 0–0 |
| Vedrich Rechitsa | 2–2 | 5–1 | 2–5 | 0–2 | 1–1 | 0–1 | 0–0 | 0–2 | 1–0 | 0–1 | 2–0 | 2–0 | 1–0 | 4–2 | 0–0 | 2–0 | |

Source: rsssf.com
Legend: Blue = home team win; Yellow = draw; Red = away team win.

== Top scorers ==
| Rank | Name | Team | Goals |
|---|---|---|---|
| 1 | (Belarus) Sergey Baranovsky | Dinamo Minsk | 19 |
| 1 | (Belarus) Miroslav Romaschenko | Vedrich Rechitsa / Dnepr Mogilev | 19 |
| 3 | (Belarus) Andrey Skorobogatko | Dnepr Mogilev | 15 |
| 3 | (Belarus) Ihar Fralow | Fandok Bobruisk / KIM Vitebsk | 15 |
| 5 | (Belarus) Sergey Kulanin | KIM Vitebsk | 14 |
| 6 | (Belarus) Yury Mazurchik | Neman Grodno | 13 |
| 6 | (Belarus) Oleg Radushko | Dnepr Mogilev | 13 |
| 8 | (Belarus) Sergey Solodovnikov | Neman Grodno | 12 |
| 8 | (Belarus) Dmitry Barabash | Torpedo Mogilev | 12 |
| 8 | (Belarus) Andrey Yusipets | Gomselmash Gomel | 12 |
| 8 | (Belarus) Oleg Putilo | Belarus Minsk | 12 |

== See also ==
- 1992–93 Belarusian First League
- 1992–93 Belarusian Cup
