= FC BGATU-Niva Samokhvalovichi =

- Full name: Football club BGATU-Niva Samokhvalovichi
- Founded: 1989
- Dissolved: 2008
- Ground: Samokhvalovichi, Minsk Oblast, Belarus
- League: Belarusian Second League
- 2008: 16th

FC BGATU-Niva Samokhvalovichi was a Belarusian football club based in Samokhvalovichi, Minsk Oblast.

== History ==
The team was originally named Niva Samokhvalovichi and until 1991 they played in the lower levels of the Belarusian SSR league. In 1992 Niva joined the newly created Belarusian First League. During the 1992–93 season the team was known as Niva-Trudovye Rezervy Samokhvalovichi, and in 1993 they were renamed Santanas Samokhvalovichi due to sponsorship. After the 1994–95 season Santanas withdrew to amateur level due to lack of funds. Santanas returned for one season in the Second League in 1997 before again withdrawing. They made their final appearance in the Second League in 2008 as BGATU-Niva Samokhvalovichi before withdrawing for the third time.
