= FC ZLiN Gomel =

ZLiN Gomel
- Full name: Football Club ZLiN Gomel
- Founded: 1989
- Dissolved: 2006
- Ground: Gomselmash Stadium, Gomel
- League: Belarusian First League
- 2005: 4th

FC ZLiN Gomel was a Belarusian football club based in Gomel.

== History ==
The club was founded in 1989. From 1989 till 1991 they played in Belarusian SSR league, and from 1992 until 2005 in Belarusian First and Second leagues.

Before the start of 2006 season the club merged with Slavia Mozyr to form FC Mozyr-ZLiN, which became a successor of Slavia and was eventually renamed back to Slavia Mozyr.

The club name ZLiN stands for Zavod Litya i Normaley (Foundry and Standards Works, a plant based in Gomel).

== Performance history ==
Season	League	Pos.	Pl.	W	D	L	GS	GA	P	Cup	Notes	Manager
1992	3D	3	15	9	2	4	22	15	20	Last 32		
1992-93	2D	6	30	14	6	10	51	37	34			
1993-94	2D	7	28	9	8	11	28	37	26			
1994-95	2D	14	30	8	5	17	26	67	21	Last 64	Relegated	
1995	3D - B	11	12	3	2	7	16	19	11			
1996	3D - B	12	26	6	6	14	35	43	24			
1997	3D - B	3	28	17	5	6	60	27	56		Promoted	
1998	2D	7	30	12	8	10	42	41	44			
1999	2D	11	30	9	9	12	37	30	36			
2000	2D	12	30	10	8	12	30	25	38	2nd round		
2001	2D	7	28	9	8	11	35	36	35	1st round		
2002	2D	7	30	14	4	12	42	34	46			
2003	2D	6	30	14	6	10	47	38	48			
2004	2D	5	30	12	10	8	31	18	46			
2005	2D	4	30	14	12	4	35	17	54	2nd round	Merged	
2006	2D		—	—	—	—	—	—		1st round		
