= FC RShVSM-Olympia Minsk =

- Full name: Football club RShVSM-Olympia Minsk
- Founded: 1985
- Dissolved: 2000
- Ground: Minsk, Belarus
- League: Belarusian Second League
- 2000: 3rd

FC RShVSM-Olympia Minsk (Belarusian: ФК РШВСМ-Алімпія, FK RShVSM-Alimpiya) was a Belarusian football club based in Minsk. It represented the Belarusian State University of Physical Training.

== History ==
Throughout its history, the club was always associated with a number of sport universities and youth football schools based in Minsk.

It was founded in 1985 as SKIF. From 1985 until 1991, the team played in Belarusian SSR Top League. In 1990, it was renamed to SKIF-ShVSM.

In 1992, the team was renamed to SKIF-RShVSM and joined newly created Belarusian First League. In the middle of 1992–93 season, they were renamed to AFViS-RShVSM. After unsuccessful 1994–95 season the team relegated to Belarusian Second League and its name was shortened to AFViS and in 1996 changed back to AFViS-RShVSM. The last name change (to RShVSM-Olympia, 'Olympia' notes relation to the School of Olympic reserve) occurred before the team's last professional season in early 2000. Since 2001, the team only participated in youth tournaments.

=== Abbreviations ===
- SKIF stands for the Sports Club of Institute of Physical Culture (Russian: Спортивный Клуб Института Физкультуры, Sportivny Klub Instituta Fizkultury).
- RShVSM stands for the Republican School of the Supreme Sport Mastery (Russian: Республиканская Школа Высшего Спортивного Мастерства, Respublikanskaya Shkola Vysshego Sportivnogo Masterstva).
- AFViS stands for the Academy of Physical Education and Sports (Russian: Академия Физического Воспитания и Спорта, Akademia Fizicheskogo Vospitaniya i Sporta).
