= FC Stroitel Vitebsk =

- Full name: Football Club Stroitel Vitebsk
- Founded: 1989
- Dissolved: 1995
- Ground: Vitebsk, Belarus

FC Stroitel Vitebsk was a Belarusian football club based in Vitebsk.

== History ==
- 1989: founded as Kolos Ustye
- 1993: renamed to Kolos-Stroitel Ustye
- 1993: relocated to Vitebsk and renamed to Stroitel Vitebsk

FC Kolos Ustye was founded in 1989 in Ustye, Vitebsk Voblast, and until 1991 it was playing in Belarusian SSR league. Since 1992 Kolos started playing in Belarusian First League. In 1993 team's name was changed to Kolos-Stroitel, and in the summer of the same year the team was relocated to Vitebsk and renamed to Stroitel Vitebsk. After the end of 1994–95 season Stroitel was disbanded.
