= 2020–21 Belarusian Cup =

Tournament details
- Country: Belarus
- Teams: 56

Final positions
- Champions: BATE Borisov
- Runners-up: Isloch Minsk Raion

Tournament statistics
- Matches played: 60
- Goals scored: 230 (3.83 per match)
- Top goal scorer: Maksim Skavysh (4 goals)

2020–21 Belarusian Cup was the 30th season of the Belarusian annual cup competition. Contrary to the league season, it is conducted in a fall-spring rhythm. A total of 60 matches were played in the tournament, which started in May 2020 and concluded with a final match in May 2021. BATE Borisov won the Cup and qualified for the second qualifying round of the 2021–22 UEFA Europa Conference League.

== Participating clubs ==
The following teams take part in the competition:

2020 Belarusian Premier League all 16 teams	2020 Belarusian First League all 14 teams	2020 Belarusian Second League; 20 of the 22 teams	Winners of regional cups 6 teams
Dinamo Brest; BATE Borisov; Shakhtyor Soligorsk; Dinamo Minsk; Isloch Minsk Raion; Torpedo-BelAZ Zhodino; Gorodeya; Slavia Mozyr; Minsk; Neman Grodno; Slutsk; Energetik-BGU Minsk; Vitebsk; Belshina Bobruisk; Smolevichi; Rukh Brest	Gomel; Lokomotiv Gomel; Naftan Novopolotsk; Sputnik Rechitsa; Lida; Krumkachy Minsk; Granit Mikashevichi; Orsha; Khimik Svetlogorsk; Volna Pinsk; Slonim-2017; Smorgon; Arsenal Dzerzhinsk; Oshmyany	Baranovichi; Molodechno; Ivatsevichi; Stenles Pinsk; Osipovichi; SMIautotrans Smolevichi; Viktoriya Maryina Gorka; Gorki; Energetik-BGATU Minsk; Dnepr Mogilev; Bumprom Gomel; Zhlobin; Dnepr Rogachev; Polotsk; BGU Minsk; Chayka Zelva; Kronon Stolbtsy; Meliorator Zhitkovichi; Ostrovets; Pershy Rehiyon	Novaya Pripyat Olshany (Brest Oblast); Montazhnik Mozyr (Gomel Oblast); Sparta Volkovysk (Grodno Oblast); Alfa Minsk (Minsk); Stroitel Kopyl (Minsk Oblast); Spartak Shklov (Mogilev Oblast)

== First round ==
In this round 6 amateur clubs were drawn with 12 Second League clubs. The draw was performed on 7 May 2020. The matches were played on 16 May 2020.

16 May 2020	Montazhnik Mozyr (A)	1–1 (a.e.t.) (4–5 p)	Stenles Pinsk (III)	Mozyr
13:00	Pikuza 56'	Report	Khamitsevich 46'	Stadium: Spartak Stadium; Attendance: 280; Referee: Aleksandr Volkov (Minsk)
	Penalties
	Navasyolaw (penalty missed); Yarkov (penalty scored); Pivovarov (penalty scored); Aleshkevich (penalty missed); Ryabykh (penalty scored); Nechiporenko (penalty scored); Gonchar (penalty missed)		(penalty scored) Khamitsevich; (penalty missed) Kazaryn; (penalty scored) O. Kurgan; (penalty scored) I. Kurgan; (penalty missed) Rushnitsky; (penalty scored) Lozyuk; (penalty scored) Lodyga

16 May 2020	Osipovichi (III)	3–1	Alfa Minsk (A)	Osipovichi
13:00	Stasenko 45+3'; Filipenko 77'; Burak 87'	Report	Bogushevskiy 11'	Stadium: Yunost Stadium; Attendance: 100; Referee: Mikhail Tkhagolegov (Brest)

16 May 2020	Chayka Zelva (III)	0–4	SMIautotrans Smolevichi (III)	Zelva
13:00		Report	Batura 49'; Minko 62', 70'; Bazei 63' (o.g.)	Stadium: Kolos Stadium; Attendance: 97; Referee: Dmitriy Kovalevskiy (Vitebsk)

16 May 2020	Polotsk (III)	2–2 (a.e.t.) (10–9 p)	Molodechno (III)	Polotsk
14:00	Kanonik 38'; Ivanow 43'	Report	Kabachevskiy 3'; Drozd 73'	Stadium: Spartak Stadium; Attendance: 120; Referee: Aleksandr Kolochinsky (Mogilev)
	Penalties
	Lysenok (penalty scored); Smolyakov (penalty missed); Lyakh (penalty scored); Hancharenka (penalty scored); Kanonik (penalty scored); Golenkov (penalty scored); Kamenny (penalty scored); Dovbysh (penalty scored); Shokel (penalty scored); Astravnev (penalty scored); Lyakh (penalty missed); Kanonik (penalty scored)		(penalty scored) Marozaw; (penalty scored) Guletskiy; (penalty scored) Fedotov; (penalty missed) Drozd; (penalty scored) Metlitskiy; (penalty scored) Bazylyuk; (penalty scored) Burachenok; (penalty scored) Imeryakov; (penalty scored) Kabachevskiy; (penalty scored) Chernykh; (penalty missed) Metlitskiy; (penalty missed) Burachenok

16 May 2020	Novaya Pripyat Olshany (A)	4–2	Dnepr Rogachev (III)	Olshany
15:00	Tarasevich 44' (pen.); Andrusevich 45'; Simonovich 51'; Lemeza 53'	Report	Dashkevich 26'; Yakimtsov 39'	Stadium: School Stadium; Attendance: 700; Referee: Aleksey Obelevskiy (Grodno)

16 May 2020	Stroitel Kopyl (A)	2–1	Ivatsevichi (III)	Kopyl
15:00	Pukhov 31'; Rakhimov 65'	Report	Zybailo 7'	Stadium: FOK Stadium; Attendance: 50; Referee: Vyacheslav Naronskiy (Minsk)

16 May 2020	Sparta Volkovysk (A)	1–4 (a.e.t.)	Baranovichi (III)	Krasnaselski
16:00	Krechak 54'	Report	Shreitor 90+4'; Emirkuliev 99'; Kisly 113'; Kruglenya 116'	Stadium: Tsementnik Stadium; Attendance: 100; Referee: Ruslan Lobanov (Minsk)

16 May 2020	Spartak Shklov (A)	2–0	Viktoriya Maryina Gorka (III)	Shklov
16:00	Tishurov 30'; Dombrov 51'	Report		Stadium: Spartak Stadium; Attendance: 100; Referee: Pavel Rudenkov (Gomel)

16 May 2020	BGU Minsk (III)	3–1	Zhlobin (III)	Minsk
17:30	Zavadich 41'; Karachun 57'; Ardjnaov 75'	Report	Pavlenkovich 48' (pen.)	Stadium: RCOR-BGU Stadium; Attendance: 45; Referee: Dmitry Kuradovets (Pinsk)

== Second round ==
The draw was performed on 18 May 2020. The matches were played on 6 June 2020. Krumkachy Minsk were given a bye to the next round by drawing of lots.

6 June 2020	Bumprom Gomel (III)	0–6	Dnepr Mogilev (III)	Gomel
13:00		Report	Antonov 45+1'; Sidarenka 49'; Kapov 54', 85'; Bobchenok 67'; V. Kabyshev 70'	Stadium: SDYuSShOR-8 Stadium; Attendance: 100; Referee: Pavel Koronets (Zhodino)

6 June 2020	Osipovichi (III)	1–3	Sputnik Rechitsa (II)	Osipovichi
13:00	Stasenko 13'	Report	Charkin 1' (o.g.); Krawchanka 37'; Nikitin 78'	Stadium: Yunost Stadium; Attendance: 200; Referee: Dmitry Dmitriyev (Fanipol)

6 June 2020	Meliorator Zhitkovichi (III)	3–0	Lida (II)	Zhitkovichi
14:00	Yunchits 58'	Report	Syrisko 48'; Tryukhan 102'	Stadium: Central Stadium; Attendance: 255; Referee: Mikhail Tkhagolegov (Brest)

6 June 2020	Polotsk (III)	1–3	Khimik Svetlogorsk (II)	Polotsk
14:00	Kanonik 90+3'	Report	Trofimchuk 20'; Yakhno 65'; Krukhtanov 79'	Stadium: Spartak Stadium; Attendance: 150; Referee: Vitaliy Poltarzhitskiy (Chervyen)

6 June 2020	Gorki (III)	0–3	Oshmyany (II)	Gorki
15:00		Report	Demidchik 17', 29'; Malinovskiy 52'	Stadium: City Stadium; Attendance: 100; Referee: Olga Tereshko (Molodechno)

6 June 2020	Novaya Pripyat Olshany (A)	0–3	Volna Pinsk (II)	Olshany
15:00		Report	M. Khlebosolov 78'; Kuratnik 83'; Baskakov 86'	Stadium: School Stadium; Attendance: 850; Referee: Sergey Klimashevskiy (Minsk)

6 June 2020	Kronon Stolbtsy (III)	0–6	Granit Mikashevichi (II)	Stolbtsy
16:00		Report	Bobruk 3'; Levkovets 48', 54'; Gorbach 70'; Sapon 73'; Pavlovets 82' (pen.)	Stadium: Yunost Stadium; Attendance: 250; Referee: Sergey Chistov (Minsk)

6 June 2020	SMIautotrans Smolevichi (III)	2–5	Slonim-2017 (II)	Oktyabrsky
16:00	Minko 27'; Sheremet 68'	Report	Artyukh 10', 21'; Koshal 56' (pen.); Saramakha 58'; Sikoyev 71'	Stadium: FOK Oktyabrsky; Attendance: 30; Referee: Pavel Gritsuk (Gomel)

6 June 2020	Stroitel Kopyl (A)	1–3	Orsha (II)	Kopyl
16:00	Shafranovich 50'	Report	Shuhunkow 55'; Burnos 58'; Kitayev 84' (pen.)	Stadium: FOK Stadium; Attendance: 90; Referee: Vladimir Rusakov (Minsk)

6 June 2020	Baranovichi (III)	1–0	Smorgon (II)	Baranovichi
16:00	D. Khlebosolov 22' (pen.)	Report		Stadium: Lokomotiv Stadium; Attendance: 638; Referee: Vyacheslav Naronskiy (Minsk)

6 June 2020	Energetik-BGATU Minsk (III)	2–6	Ostrovets (III)	Minsk
16:00	Monich 40', 90'	Report	Krot 18', 52'; Knotko-Shterk 57'; Zakharen 58', 86'; Pavlyuchenko 63' (o.g.)	Stadium: Lokomotiv Stadium; Attendance: 80; Referee: Dmitriy Markov (Mogilev)

6 June 2020	BGU Minsk (III)	0–5	Gomel (II)	Minsk
17:00		Report	Troyakov 7'; Zhostkin 41'; Vaskow 73'; Batyschev 83'; Teslyuk 86'	Stadium: RCOR-BGU Stadium; Attendance: 100; Referee: Aleksey Obelevskiy (Grodno)

6 June 2020	Stenles Pinsk (III)	0–1	Arsenal Dzerzhinsk (II)	Pinsk
17:30		Report	Asipenka 47' (pen.)	Stadium: Football Academy Stadium; Attendance: 230; Referee: Yevgeniy Yasenovich (Minsk)

6 June 2020	Pershy Rehiyon (III)	0–15	Lokomotiv Gomel (II)	Brest
18:00		Report	Solovey 5', 86', 89'; Khanenya 6'; Kozlovskiy 9', 38'; Lyakh 15'; Shabanov 19'; Markaw 27'; Klenyo 55'; Makushinsky 59' (pen.); Bondarenko 72', 84'; Sviridenko 76'; Lozinskiy 78' (o.g.)	Stadium: COR Stadium; Attendance: 50; Referee: Aleksandr Kopat (Zhodino)

6 June 2020	Spartak Shklov (A)	0–4	Naftan Novopolotsk (II)	Shklov
18:00		Report	Shubko 5'; Zherdev 30'; Tamelo 40'; Golenko 90+3'	Stadium: Spartak Stadium; Attendance: 150; Referee: Dmitry Dubatovka (Lida)

1. Originally won 2–1 (a.e.t.) by Lida. Later match was awarded as 3–0 technical win to Meliorator Zhitkovichi as Lida broke the limit of foreign players in the squad.

== Round of 32 ==
The draw was performed on 8 June 2020.

28 August 2020	Arsenal Dzerzhinsk (II)	4–1 (a.e.t.)	Smolevichi	Minsk
16:00	Patsko 42'; Senko 93'; Abramovich 104'; Matyash 112'	Report	Shchagrykovich 42'	Stadium: RCOR-BGU Stadium; Attendance: 0 Referee: Sergey Krasnikov (Grodno)

28 August 2020	Orsha (II)	1–6	Energetik-BGU Minsk	Orsha
18:00	Tikhomirov 54'	Report	Bakić 12', 29', 85'; Vigovskiy 32'; Sokol 58'; Mosakhanian 89' (pen.)	Stadium: City Stadium; Attendance: 0 Referee: Valeriy Golomzik (Bobruisk)

28 August 2020	Dnepr Mogilev (III)	1–2	Isloch Minsk Raion	Mogilev
20:00	V. Kabyshev 23'	Report	Yansane 53', 88'	Stadium: Spartak Stadium; Attendance: 0 Referee: Sergey Gorayutin (Minsk)

29 August 2020	Naftan Novopolotsk (II)	0–2	Gorodeya	Novopolotsk
15:00		Report	Pushnyakov 45+1'; S. Arkhipov 75' (pen.)	Stadium: Atlant Stadium; Attendance: 0 Referee: Andrey Vasilevich (Mozyr)

29 August 2020	Khimik Svetlogorsk (II)	0–3	Rukh Brest	Svetlogorsk
15:30		Report	Oreshkevich 19'; Pyatrenka 68'; Nwafor 83'	Stadium: Khimik Stadium; Attendance: 0 Referee: Dmitry Dmitriyev (Fanipol)

29 August 2020	Baranovichi (III)	0–6	Vitebsk	Ivatsevichy
16:00		Report	Fedosov 5', 15', 44'; Diego 33'; Chekhov 37' (o.g.); Gurenko 39'	Stadium: Klenovka Arena; Attendance: 0 Referee: Sergey Chistov (Minsk)

29 August 2020	Lokomotiv Gomel (II)	0–2	Slutsk	Gomel
16:30		Report	Sirima 20'; Kazlow 58' (pen.)	Stadium: Lokomotiv Stadium; Attendance: 0 Referee: Dmitriy Markov (Mogilev)

29 August 2020	Granit Mikashevichi (II)	0–5	BATE Borisov	Luninets
17:00		Report	Moukam 11'; Bessmertny 49'; Willumsson 53'; Kopitović 67'; Gayevoy 90+1'	Stadium: Polesye Stadium; Attendance: 0 Referee: Dmitry Dolya (Grodno)

29 August 2020	Volna Pinsk (II)	0–4	Slavia Mozyr	Pinsk
18:00		Report	Grechikha 25' (o.g.); Katlyaraw 41'; Barsukow 47'; Slyusar 82' (pen.)	Stadium: Volna Stadium; Attendance: 0 Referee: Pavel Koronets (Zhodino)

30 August 2020	Sputnik Rechitsa (II)	3–2 (a.e.t.)	Belshina Bobruisk	Rechitsa
15:00	Potorocha 77' (pen.), 83' (pen.), 91'	Report	Solanovich 47'; Hlyabko 81' (pen.)	Stadium: Central Stadium; Attendance: 0 Referee: Denis Scherbakov (Minsk)

30 August 2020	Oshmyany (II)	0–5	Torpedo-BelAZ Zhodino	Oshmyany
16:00		Report	Lipe 31'; Moresche 49', 90', 90+1'; Nikolayevich 78'	Stadium: FOK Stadium; Attendance: 0 Referee: Anton Lashuk (Molodechno)

30 August 2020	Meliorator Zhitkovichi (III)	0–3	Dinamo Brest	Zhitkovichi
17:00		Report	Laptsew 50'; Krivets 55'; Akunets 76' (o.g.)	Stadium: City Stadium; Attendance: 0 Referee: Yevgeniy Naumov (Minsk)

30 August 2020	Gomel (II)	1–4	Shakhtyor Soligorsk	Gomel
18:00	Yudenkov 81'	Report	A. Arkhipov 10'; Bodul 55'; Yakhshiboev 90+1', 90+3'	Stadium: Central Stadium; Attendance: 0 Referee: Sergey Stetsurin (Brest)

1 September 2020	Krumkachy Minsk (II)	2–0	Dinamo Minsk	Minsk
17:00	Lynko 18'; Kolyadko 50'	Report		Stadium: SOK Olimpiysky; Attendance: 1,500; Referee: Viktor Shimusik (Osipovichi)

5 September 2020	Ostrovets (III)	0–3	Minsk	Ostrovets
15:300		Report	Anufryyew 30', 90+4'; O. Vasylyev 88'	Stadium: City Stadium; Attendance: 0 Referee: Olga Tereshko (Molodechno)

30 September 2020	Slonim-2017 (II)	1–3	Neman Grodno	Slonim
16:00	Silinskiy 45'	Report	Marušić 26'; Poé 49', 87'	Stadium: Yunost Stadium; Attendance: 350; Referee: Dmitry Dmitriyev (Fanipol)

1. Matches were played behind closed doors due to ongoing protests in Belarus.

== Round of 16 ==
The draw was performed on 9 September 2020.

2 October 2020	Sputnik Rechitsa (II)	1–4	Torpedo-BelAZ Zhodino	Rechitsa
14:00	Kurlovich 55'	Report	Gabriel Ramos 9' (pen.); Antilevsky 25'; Lipe 53'; Nikolayevich 90+2'	Stadium: Central Stadium; Attendance: 320; Referee: Sergey Stetsurin (Brest)

2 October 2020	Slutsk	1–4	Shakhtyor Soligorsk	Slutsk
16:00	Sirima 87'	Report	Balanovich 61'; Sachywka 64'; Begunov 67'; Szöke 84'	Stadium: City Stadium; Attendance: 470; Referee: Pavel Koronets (Zhodino)

3 October 2020	Krumkachy Minsk (II)	0–4	Isloch Minsk Raion	Minsk
14:00		Report	Rybak 8'; Baradzin 59'; Stephen 69'; Makas 90+3'	Stadium: SOK Olimpiysky; Attendance: 450; Referee: Andrey Vasilevich (Mozyr)

3 October 2020	Rukh Brest	0–3	Minsk	Brest
16:00		Report	Anufryyew 31'; Vasylyev 45' (pen.), 90+2'	Stadium: OSK Brestskiy; Attendance: 361; Referee: Dmitry Dmitriyev (Fanipol)

3 October 2020	Gorodeya	0–3	Arsenal Dzerzhinsk (II)	Gorodeya
18:00		Report	Senko 24', 56'; Miroyevskiy 42'	Stadium: Gorodeya Stadium; Attendance: 454; Referee: Yevgeniy Naumov (Minsk)

4 October 2020	Energetik-BGU Minsk	0–1	Vitebsk	Minsk
14:00		Report	Teverov 76'	Stadium: RCOR-BGU Stadium; Attendance: 150; Referee: Dmitry Dolya (Grodno)

4 October 2020	Slavia Mozyr	0–2	Neman Grodno	Mozyr
16:00		Report	Zhukowski 7'; Poé 90+1'	Stadium: Yunost Stadium; Attendance: 1,700; Referee: Denis Scherbakov (Minsk)

5 December 2020	BATE Borisov	4–2	Dinamo Brest	Borisov
18:45	Milić 3'; Drahun 13', 74'; Skavysh 79'	Report	Laptsew 17' (pen.); Noyok 67'	Stadium: Borisov Arena; Attendance: 1,000; Referee: Aleksei Kulbakov (Gomel)

== Quarter-finals ==
Team 1	Agg.	Team 2	1st leg	2nd leg
Minsk	1–1 (a)	Isloch Minsk Raion	1–1	0–0
Torpedo-BelAZ Zhodino	3–0	Arsenal Dzerzhinsk (II)	3–0	0–0
BATE Borisov	5–3	Vitebsk	2–1	3–2
Shakhtyor Soligorsk	4–2	Neman Grodno	3–0	1–2

=== First leg ===
6 March 2021	Minsk	1–1	Isloch Minsk Raion	Minsk
14:30	Kantsavy 17'	Report	Chahovets 50' (o.g.)	Stadium: FC Minsk Stadium; Attendance: 200; Referee: Dmitry Dolya (Grodno)

6 March 2021	Torpedo-BelAZ Zhodino	3–0	Arsenal Dzerzhinsk (II)	Zhodino
16:30	Kirilenko 63'; Nikolayevich 73'; Odeyobo 90+3'	Report		Stadium: Torpedo Stadium; Attendance: 350; Referee: Dmitry Dmitriyev (Fanipol)

7 March 2021	BATE Borisov	2–1	Vitebsk	Minsk
14:30	Signevich 31', 53'	Report	Wanderson 25'	Stadium: FC Minsk Stadium; Attendance: 150; Referee: Andrey Vasilevich (Mozyr)

7 March 2021	Shakhtyor Soligorsk	3–0	Neman Grodno	Soligorsk
16:30	Kendysh 61' (pen.); Darboe 77'; Ubaydullaev 80'	Report		Stadium: Shakhtyor Stadium; Attendance: 800; Referee: Sergey Stetsurin (Brest)

=== Second leg ===
6 April 2021	Arsenal Dzerzhinsk (II)	0–0 (0–3 agg.)	Torpedo-BelAZ Zhodino	Minsk
17:00		Report		Stadium: RCOR-BGU Stadium; Attendance: 200; Referee: Sergey Krasnikov (Grodno)

6 April 2021	Isloch Minsk Raion	0–0 (0–0 (a) agg.)	Minsk	Minsk
19:00		Report		Stadium: FC Minsk Stadium; Attendance: 100; Referee: Sergey Stetsurin (Brest)

7 April 2021	Neman Grodno	2–1 (2–4 agg.)	Shakhtyor Soligorsk	Grodno
15:00	Dzhigero 16'; Zubovich 67'	Report	Okeuhie 88'	Stadium: Neman Stadium; Attendance: 450; Referee: Sergey Chistov (Minsk)

7 April 2021	Vitebsk	2–3 (3–5 agg.)	BATE Borisov	Vitebsk
17:00	Krasnov 22'; Diego 60' (pen.)	Report	Milić 9'; Bessmertny 16'; Skavysh 85'	Stadium: Vitebsky CSK; Attendance: 600; Referee: Andrey Vasilevich (Mozyr)

== Semi-finals ==
Team 1	Agg.	Team 2	1st leg	2nd leg
Shakhtyor Soligorsk	1–2	Isloch Minsk Raion	1–0	0–2
BATE Borisov	5–2	Torpedo-BelAZ Zhodino	4–1	1–1

=== First leg ===
21 April 2021	Shakhtyor Soligorsk	1–0	Isloch Minsk Raion	Soligorsk
18:45	Myakish 76' (o.g.)	Report		Stadium: Shakhtyor Stadium; Attendance: 900; Referee: Sergey Stetsurin (Brest)

21 April 2021	BATE Borisov	4–1	Torpedo-BelAZ Zhodino	Borisov
20:45	Willumsson 2'; Skavysh 35' (pen.), 76'; Bardachow 53' (o.g.)	Report	D. Antilevsky 29'	Stadium: City Stadium; Attendance: 2,000; Referee: Amin Kurgheli (Gomel)

=== Second leg ===
5 May 2021	Isloch Minsk Raion	2–0 (2–1 agg.)	Shakhtyor Soligorsk	Molodechno
17:30	Dibango 68'; Yusov 76'	Report		Stadium: City Stadium; Attendance: 290; Referee: Aleksei Kulbakov (Gomel)

5 May 2021	Torpedo-BelAZ Zhodino	1–1 (2–5 agg.)	BATE Borisov	Zhodino
19:30	D. Antilevsky 37'	Report	J. Filipović 30'	Stadium: Torpedo Stadium; Attendance: 1,570; Referee: Andrey Vasilevich (Mozyr)

== Final ==
The final was played on 23 May 2021 at Central Stadium in Gomel.

23 May 2021
19:00 UTC+3

BATE Borisov	2–1	Isloch Minsk Raion
Drahun 31'; Rybak 77'	Report	Kamarowski 59'

Central Stadium, Gomel
Attendance: 6,253
Referee: Sergey Stetsurin (Brest)

BATE:
GK	35	(Belarus) Anton Chichkan	(yellow card) 90+4'
RB	92	(Belarus) Maksim Valadzko
CB	27	(Belarus) Pavel Rybak
CB	32	(Croatia) Jakov Filipović
LB	4	(Serbia) Aleksandar Filipović
DM	5	(Belarus) Yevgeniy Yablonskiy
DM	25	(Russia) Pavel Karasyov	(yellow card) 72'	(substituted off) 80'
RW	10	(Uzbekistan) Shokhboz Umarov	(yellow card) 55'	(substituted off) 62'
CM	8	(Belarus) Stanislaw Drahun (c)		(substituted off) 82'
LW	33	(Belarus) Pavel Nyakhaychyk		(substituted off) 90+1'
CF	15	(Belarus) Maksim Skavysh
Substitutes:
GK	16	(Belarus) Andrey Kudravets
FW	13	(Belarus) Mikalay Signevich	(yellow card) 87'	(substituted on) 82'
DF	14	(Montenegro) Boris Kopitović
DF	17	(Belarus) Danila Nechayev		(substituted on) 90+1'
MF	19	(Belarus) Dmitriy Bessmertny
DF	22	(Belarus) Aleksey Nosko		(substituted on) 80'
FW	26	(Serbia) Nemanja Milić		(substituted on) 62'
Manager:
(Belarus) Vitaly Zhukovsky

ISLOCH:
GK	16	(Belarus) Vladislav Vasilyuchek
RB	41	(Belarus) Artem Gurenko
CB	3	(Belarus) Dzmitry Zinovich
CB	18	(Belarus) Aleksey Shalashnikov	(yellow card) 30'	(substituted off) 40'
LB	55	(Cameroon) Yvan Dibango
CM	91	(Belarus) Aleh Patotski		(substituted off) 54'
CM	99	(Belarus) Ruslan Lisakovich
RW	71	(Belarus) Anton Kavalyow		(substituted off) 71'
CAM	15	(Belarus) Dzmitry Kamarowski (c)
LW	17	(Ukraine) Yuriy Kozyrenko	(yellow card) 87'
FW	11	(Belarus) Vladislav Morozov
Substitutes:
GK	1	(Belarus) Andrey Sinenko
MF	9	(Belarus) Alyaksandr Anufryyew		(substituted on) 78'
DF	35	(Belarus) Vadim Pigas
FW	37	(Belarus) Dmitry Nekrashevich
MF	39	(Russia) Kirill Glushchenkov	(yellow card) 76'	(substituted on) 40'
MF	97	(Belarus) Maksim Myakish
MF	98	(Belarus) Dmitry Lisakovich		(substituted on) 54'
Manager:
(Belarus) Artsyom Radzkow
