= 2020 Belarusian First League =

Belarusian First League
- Season: 2020
- Champions: Sputnik Rechitsa
- Promoted: Sputnik Rechitsa, Gomel, Smorgon
- Matches: 151
- Goals: 482 (3.19 per match)
- Top goalscorer: (Belarus) Andrey Solovey (Lokomotiv Gomel)
- Biggest home win: Gomel 7–2 Lida
- Biggest away win: Oshmyany 0–6 Lokomotiv Gomel
- Highest scoring: Oshmyany 5–5 Volna Pinsk

2020 Belarusian First League is the 30th season of 2nd level football in Belarus. It started in April and finished in November 2020.

== Team changes from 2019 season ==
Two best teams of 2019 Belarusian First League (Belshina Bobruisk and Smolevichi), as well as third-placed Rukh Brest (who won the promotion/relegation play-off) were promoted to Belarusian Premier League. They were replaced by 15th-placed teams of 2019 Belarusian Premier League (Gomel) and 14th-placed Dnyapro Mogilev (who lost the play-off to Rukh Brest). 16th-placed Premier League team Torpedo Minsk disbanded, leaving a vacancy in the First League.

Last placed team of the last season (Baranovichi) relegated to the Second League. They were replaced by two best teams of 2019 Second League (Arsenal Dzerzhinsk and Oshmyany).

NFK Minsk reverted their name to Krumkachy Minsk during the winter break.

Dnyapro Mogilev ceased to exist in the spring. To fill in two vacant spots left by Dnyapro and Torpedo and to return to 16 participants, two teams were additionally promoted (Molodechno and Underdog Chist as the 3rd- and 4th-placed Second League teams). However, as both clubs represent neighboring cities, Molodechno were unable to secure the necessary financial support from the Maladzyechna Raion administration (who decided to fully support Underdog instead) and were forced to give up the promotion. Underdog Chist, however, were also excluded a few weeks later due to financial problems of their own, and the league was left with only 14 participants for the season.

As a result of investigation of match-fixing incidents during 2017 and 2018 seasons, five clubs were punished with points deductions before the start of the season.

== Teams summary ==
Location of teams in 2020 Belarusian First League

Team	Location	Position in 2019
Gomel	Gomel	Premier League, 15
Lokomotiv Gomel	Gomel	4
Naftan Novopolotsk	Novopolotsk	5
Sputnik Rechitsa	Rechitsa	6
Lida	Lida	7
Krumkachy Minsk	Minsk	8
Granit Mikashevichi	Mikashevichi	9
Orsha	Orsha	10
Khimik Svetlogorsk	Svetlogorsk	11
Volna Pinsk	Pinsk	12
Slonim-2017	Slonim	13
Smorgon	Smorgon	14
Arsenal Dzerzhinsk	Dzerzhinsk	Second League, 1
Oshmyany	Oshmyany	Second League, 2

== League table ==
Pos	Team	Pld	W	D	L	GF	GA	GD	Pts	Promotion or relegation
1	Sputnik Rechitsa (C, P)	26	19	4	3	50	18	+32	61	Promotion to the Belarusian Premier League
2	Gomel (Note: Gomel were deducted 5 points before the start of the season as a result of match-fixing investigation in the previous season.) (P)	26	18	5	3	60	20	+40	54	Promotion to the Belarusian Premier League
3	Krumkachy	26	16	4	6	46	28	+18	52	Advance to the promotion play-offs
4	Arsenal Dzerzhinsk	26	13	7	6	41	28	+13	46	
5	Lokomotiv Gomel	26	13	6	7	56	38	+18	45	
6	Smorgon (P)	26	10	6	10	29	26	+3	36	Promotion to the Belarusian Premier League
7	Lida (Note: Lida were deducted 3 points before the start of the season as a result of match-fixing investigation in the previous season.)	26	9	7	10	37	42	−5	31	
8	Slonim-2017	26	8	6	12	22	32	−10	30	
9	Volna Pinsk	26	7	6	13	41	52	−11	27	
10	Oshmyany (W)	26	6	8	12	35	43	−8	26	Withdrew
11	Orsha (Note: Orsha were deducted 3 points before the start of the season as a result of match-fixing investigation in the previous season.)	26	7	6	13	30	42	−12	24	
12	Naftan Novopolotsk (Note: Naftan Novopolotsk were deducted 15 points before the start of the season as a result of match-fixing investigation in the previous season.)	26	10	6	10	36	43	−7	21	
13	Granit Mikashevichi (W)	26	4	5	17	21	52	−31	17	Withdrew
14	Khimik Svetlogorsk (Note: Khimik Svetlogorsk were deducted 9 points before the start of the season as a result of match-fixing investigation in the previous season.) (W)	26	2	4	20	12	52	−40	1	Advance to the relegation play-offs; Withdrew

Updated to match(es) played on 21 November 2020. Source: football.by
Rules for classification: 1) Points; 2) Head-to-head points; 3) Head-to-head goal difference; 4) Head-to-head goals scored; 5) Goal difference; 6) Matches won; 7) Goals scored.
(C) Champions; (P) Promoted; (W) Withdrew after the season

== Results ==
Home \ Away	ARS	GOM	GRA	KHI	KRU	LID	LGM	NAF	ORS	OSH	SLO	SPU	SMR	VOL
Arsenal Dzerzhinsk		1–1	3–0	1–0	1–1	1–2	4–0	4–2	1–0	0–3	4–1	1–1	1–0	3–2
Gomel	0–1		2–1	3–1	0–2	7–2	2–3	0–0	4–2	2–0	3–0	1–0	1–1	2–0
Granit Mikashevichi	1–2	1–4		2–1	1–2	1–2	1–1	1–2	1–1	1–3	1–0	0–1	1–0	0–1
Khimik Svetlogorsk	2–2	0–1	0–0		0–4	0–1	0–4	0–1	2–1	1–4	0–1	0–3	2–1	1–2
Krumkachy Minsk	2–0	1–1	4–1	1–0		2–2	1–0	1–0	2–0	1–0	2–1	0–2	2–1	2–3
Lida	1–0	0–2	2–3	0–0	2–1		4–2	2–2	1–5	3–1	3–0	0–1	0–0	0–1
Lokomotiv Gomel	1–1	1–4	4–0	5–0	4–0	2–3		3–3	1–1	2–0	0–0	1–1	2–1	1–0
Naftan Novopolotsk	2–1	1–4	3–0	3–0	1–2	1–1	1–5		3–0	1–1	2–1	0–3	0–1	2–0
Orsha	0–1	0–2	2–1	4–0	0–4	3–2	0–2	0–2		0–0	1–3	0–0	0–0	3–2
Oshmyany	0–1	1–1	1–1	0–0	2–3	3–2	0–6	5–1	0–0		1–0	0–1	0–1	5–5
Slonim-2017	0–1	0–3	1–1	1–0	1–0	0–0	3–0	1–1	2–1	2–0		1–3	0–1	1–1
Sputnik Rechitsa	2–1	0–4	2–0	1–0	2–1	1–0	5–1	5–0	4–2	1–0	3–0		1–1	3–1
Smorgon	1–1	1–3	5–0	2–0	1–3	1–0	1–2	1–0	0–1	1–1	0–2	2–1		2–0
Volna Pinsk	1–1	0–3	3–1	4–2	2–2	2–2	2–3	1–2	2–3	3–2	0–0	1–3	2–3	

Updated to match(es) played on 25 October 2020. Source: football.by
Legend: Blue = home team win; Yellow = draw; Red = away team win.

== Promotion play-offs ==
=== First leg ===
15 December 2020
16:00 GMT+3

Krumkachy Minsk	0–2	Slutsk
	Report	Bobko 45'; Sirima 79' (pen.)

Football Manege, Minsk
Attendance: 0
Referee: Andrey Vasilevich (Mozyr)

=== Second leg ===
19 December 2020
13:30 GMT+3

Slutsk	2–1	Krumkachy Minsk
Mohammed 5'; Sirima 34' (pen.)	Report	Yatskevich 90+2'

Football Manege, Minsk
Attendance: 0
Referee: Sergey Stetsurin (Brest)

Slutsk won 4–1 on aggregate and therefore both clubs remain in their respective leagues.

== Relegation play-offs ==
=== First leg ===
28 November 2020
13:00 GMT+3

Khimik Svetlogorsk	0–0	Molodechno
	Report

Khimik Stadium, Svetlogorsk
Referee: Denis Scherbakov (Minsk)

=== Second leg ===
5 December 2020
13:00 GMT+3

Molodechno	0–4	Khimik Svetlogorsk
	Report	Yakhno 16'; Imeryakov 23' (o.g.); Abdullayev 65'; Arhiptsaw 79'

City Stadium, Molodechno
Referee: Vitaly Sevostyanik (Grodno)

Khimik Svetlogorsk won 4–0 on aggregate and therefore both clubs remain in their respective leagues.

== Top goalscorers ==
Rank	Goalscorer	Team	Goals
1	(Belarus) Andrey Solovey	Lokomotiv Gomel	20
2	(Belarus) Artsyom Vaskow	Gomel	16
3	(Belarus) Dmitry Gomza	Gomel	11
4	(Belarus) Yan Senkevich	Lida	10
4	(Belarus) Pavel Klenyo	Lokomotiv Gomel	10
4	(Belarus) Pavel Demidchik	Oshmyany	10
4	(Russia) Iskandar Zarobekov	Volna Pinsk	10
4	(Belarus) Valery Potorocha	Sputnik Rechitsa	10

Updated to games played on 21 November 2020
Source: football.by

== See also ==
- 2020 Belarusian Premier League
- 2020 Belarusian Second League
- 2019–20 Belarusian Cup
- 2020–21 Belarusian Cup
