= 2021 Belarusian First League =

Belarusian First League
- Season: 2021
- Promoted: Arsenal Dzerzhinsk; Belshina Bobruisk; Dnepr Mogilev
- Matches: 198
- Goals: 582 (2.94 per match)
- Top goalscorer: Denis Kozlovskiy (29 goals)

2021 Belarusian First League is the 31st season of 2nd level football in Belarus. It started in April and finished in November 2021.

== Team changes from 2020 season ==
Two best teams of 2020 Belarusian First League (Sputnik Rechitsa and Gomel) were promoted to Belarusian Premier League. They were replaced by two last-placed teams of 2020 Belarusian Premier League (Belshina Bobruisk and Smolevichi).

FC Smorgon (6th-placed team of last year's season) were additionally promoted to Premier League to replace Gorodeya, who disbanded in the winter. Smorgon were chosen ahead of Krumkachy (who were denied a Premier League license) and two other teams (Arsenal Dzerzhinsk and Lokomotiv Gomel, who did not apply for license due to insufficient financing).

Two best teams of 2020 Belarusian Second League (Dnepr Mogilev and Shakhtyor Petrikov) were promoted to the league.

Despite initial plans to restore 16 teams in the league for the first time since 2017, the league lost several clubs which all withdrew for financial reasons (Smolevichi, Oshmyany, Granit Mikashevichi and Khimik Svetlogorsk). Only one club was additionally promoted from the Second League (Baranovichi), and on 5 April it was decided to go ahead with just 12 teams (lowest in the league's history) in three round-robin system.

== Teams summary ==
Location of teams in 2021 Belarusian First League

Team	Location	Position in 2020
Belshina Bobruisk	Bobruisk	Premier League, 15
Krumkachy Minsk	Minsk	3
Arsenal Dzerzhinsk	Dzerzhinsk	4
Lokomotiv Gomel	Gomel	5
Lida	Lida	7
Slonim-2017	Slonim	8
Volna Pinsk	Pinsk	9
Orsha	Orsha	11
Naftan Novopolotsk	Novopolotsk	12
Dnepr Mogilev	Mogilev	Second League, 1
Shakhtyor Petrikov	Petrikov	Second League, 2
Baranovichi	Baranovichi	Second League, 4

== League table ==
Pos	Team	Pld	W	D	L	GF	GA	GD	Pts	Promotion or relegation
1	Arsenal Dzerzhinsk (P)	33	20	8	5	59	22	+37	68	Promotion to the Belarusian Premier League
2	Belshina Bobruisk (P)	33	19	6	8	69	42	+27	63	Promotion to the Belarusian Premier League
3	Krumkachy Minsk (W)	33	17	9	7	58	31	+27	60	Advance to the promotion play-offs
4	Volna Pinsk	33	16	8	9	49	39	+10	56	
5	Dnepr Mogilev (P)	33	15	10	8	58	38	+20	55	Promotion to the Belarusian Premier League
6	Lokomotiv Gomel	33	15	9	9	56	39	+17	54	
7	Shakhtyor Petrikov	33	13	7	13	50	56	−6	46	
8	Naftan Novopolotsk	33	11	11	11	44	46	−2	44	
9	Orsha	33	9	7	17	41	60	−19	34	
10	Baranovichi	33	7	7	19	38	72	−34	28	
11	Lida	33	4	9	20	33	75	−42	21	
12	Slonim-2017	33	3	7	23	27	62	−35	16	

Updated to match(es) played on 27 November 2021. Source: football.by
Rules for classification: 1) Points; 2) Head-to-head points; 3) Head-to-head goal difference; 4) Head-to-head goals scored; 5) Goal difference; 6) Matches won; 7) Goals scored.
(P) Promoted; (W) Withdrew after the season

== Results ==
=== Matchdays 1–22 ===
Home \ Away	ARS	BAR	BSH	DNE	KRU	LID	LGM	NAF	ORS	SHP	SLO	VOL
Arsenal Dzerzhinsk		5–0	4–1	0–0	0–2	1–1	0–1	2–0	4–1	2–0	3–0	0–2
Baranovichi	1–2		1–1	1–0	3–1	0–4	1–1	1–6	0–3	0–2	1–0	3–3
Belshina Bobruisk	2–0	2–0		4–1	1–0	4–2	1–1	1–1	2–1	4–1	3–1	0–2
Dnepr Mogilev	1–1	1–0	1–2		2–2	1–1	4–0	3–0	6–2	2–3	3–1	1–1
Krumkachy Minsk	0–1	4–3	0–0	1–0		4–0	1–0	1–0	6–0	3–2	4–2	4–0
Lida	1–1	1–2	0–4	0–0	1–1		0–4	1–2	0–2	1–3	1–1	0–0
Lokomotiv Gomel	1–2	1–1	2–3	1–1	1–0	4–0		1–1	2–1	5–2	4–1	1–1
Naftan Novopolotsk	0–1	2–0	0–0	0–2	1–2	3–2	2–1		3–1	2–1	2–2	1–4
Orsha	2–2	2–1	0–1	3–1	0–0	1–1	1–0	1–2		0–3	3–3	0–1
Shakhtyor Petrikov	1–3	2–1	2–1	1–3	0–3	2–3	0–0	1–1	1–1		0–2	1–0
Slonim-2017	1–3	2–0	0–2	1–2	0–0	1–0	2–2	0–0	0–2	1–2		0–1
Volna Pinsk	0–3	2–0	6–2	0–3	2–1	1–2	0–2	3–4	1–0	1–2	1–0	

Updated to match(es) played on 12 September 2021. Source: football.by
Legend: Blue = home team win; Yellow = draw; Red = away team win.

=== Matchdays 23–33 ===
Home \ Away	ARS	BAR	BSH	DNE	KRU	LID	LGM	NAF	ORS	SHP	SLO	VOL
Arsenal Dzerzhinsk		2–0						0–0	3–2	4–0	3–1	0–0
Baranovichi			3–2	2–2	2–3				1–1	3–3		
Belshina Bobruisk	0–3					5–1	4–2	4–0			4–0	1–2
Dnepr Mogilev	1–0		3–1			4–2	0–1				1–0	3–1
Krumkachy Minsk	0–0		1–3	1–1		4–0	0–2					1–1
Lida	0–1	2–3					1–7	3–2			1–1	
Lokomotiv Gomel	0–3	3–1						0–0	2–1		2–1	
Naftan Novopolotsk		5–1		1–1	0–0				0–1	0–3		1–1
Orsha			0–3	1–2	1–4	2–1				0–0		
Shakhtyor Petrikov			1–1	3–2	2–3	2–0	1–2					
Slonim-2017		0–2			0–1			1–2	2–4	0–1		0–2
Volna Pinsk		2–0				2–0	2–0		2–1	2–2		

Updated to match(es) played on 27 November 2021. Source: football.by
Legend: Blue = home team win; Yellow = draw; Red = away team win.

== Promotion play-offs ==
=== First leg ===
2 December 2021
14:30 GMT+3

Slavia Mozyr	1–0	Krumkachy Minsk
Narh 90+2'	Report

Yunost Stadium, Mazyr
Attendance: 1,560
Referee: Vitaly Sevostyanik (Grodno)

=== Second leg ===
5 December 2021
14:00 GMT+3

Krumkachy Minsk	0–0	Slavia Mozyr
	Report

SOK Alimpijski, Minsk
Attendance: 1,100
Referee: Pavel Koronets (Zhodino)

Slavia won 1–0 on aggregate and therefore both clubs remain in their respective leagues.

== Top goalscorers ==
Rank	Goalscorer	Team	Goals
1	(Belarus) Denis Kozlovskiy	Lokomotiv Gomel	29
2	(Belarus) Kiryl Sidarenka	Dnepr Mogilev	19
3	(Russia) Ramazan Isayev	Belshina Bobruisk	17
4	(Russia) Iskandar Zarobekov	Naftan Novopolotsk	16
5	(Belarus) Artyom Kiyko	Arsenal Dzerzhinsk	14

Updated to games played on 27 November 2021
Source: football.by

== See also ==
- 2021 Belarusian Premier League
- 2020–21 Belarusian Cup
- 2021–22 Belarusian Cup
