= 2021 Belarusian Premier League =

Belarusian Premier League
- Season: 2021
- Dates: 12 March – 28 November 2021
- Champions: Shakhtyor Soligorsk
- Relegated: Sputnik; Smorgon
- Champions League: Shakhtyor Soligorsk
- Conference League: BATE Borisov; Gomel; Dinamo Minsk
- Matches: 232
- Goals: 630 (2.72 per match)
- Top goalscorer: Dembo Darboe (19 goals)
- Biggest home win: Rukh Brest 7–1 Isloch Minsk Raion (13 August 2021); Torpedo-BelAZ Zhodino 7–1 Smorgon (2 October 2021)
- Biggest away win: Slavia Mozyr 0–6 Minsk (24 October 2021)
- Highest scoring: Rukh Brest 7–1 Isloch Minsk Raion (13 August 2021); Torpedo-BelAZ Zhodino 7–1 Smorgon (2 October 2021)
- Longest winning run: 13 matches Shakhtyor Soligorsk
- Longest unbeaten run: 17 matches Shakhtyor Soligorsk
- Longest winless run: 14 matches Smorgon
- Longest losing run: 6 matches Sputnik Rechitsa
- All statistics correct as of 20 November 2021.

The 2021 Belarusian Premier League was the 31st season of top-tier football in Belarus. Shakhtyor Soligorsk were the defending champions, having won their second league title last year. Shakhtyor Soligorsk won their third Belarusian Premier League title.

== Teams ==
Locations of the 2021 Belarusian Premier League teams

The bottom two teams from the 2020 season (Belshina Bobruisk and Smolevichi) were relegated to the First League (both relegated after one-year in the top flight). They were replaced by Sputnik Rechitsa (promoted to the top-flight for the first time in their history) and Gomel (promoted after a one-year absence), champions and runners-up of the 2020 Belarusian First League respectively.

In the winter 2020/21, Gorodeya (who finished 13th last year) dissolved and left a Premier League spot vacant. Smorgon (6th-placed team of last year's First League season, promoted after an eleven-year absence) were admitted to fill the vacancy, after Krumkachy Minsk (First League 3rd-placed team) were denied Premier League license, and another two clubs (Arsenal Dzerzhinsk and Lokomotiv Gomel) rejected the opportunity due to insufficient financing.

Team	Location	Venue	Capacity	Position in 2020
BATE	Borisov	Borisov Arena	13,121	2nd
Gomel	Gomel	Central Stadium (Gomel)	14,307	2nd (First League)
Dinamo Brest	Brest	OSK Brestsky	10,060	4th
Dinamo Minsk	Minsk	Dinamo Stadium	22,324	6th
Energetik-BGU	Minsk	City Stadium (Borisov)	5,402	10th
Isloch	Minsk Raion	City Stadium (Molodechno)	4,800	7th
Minsk	Minsk	Traktor Stadium	17,600	11th
Neman	Grodno	Neman Stadium	8,479	5th
Rukh	Brest	OSK Brestsky	10,060	8th
Shakhtyor	Soligorsk	Stroitel Stadium	4,200	1st
Slavia	Mozyr	Yunost Stadium (Mozyr)	5,133	9th
Slutsk	Slutsk	City Stadium (Slutsk)	1,896	14th
Smorgon	Smorgon	Yunost Stadium (Smorgon)	2,625	6th (First League)
Sputnik	Rechitsa	Central Stadium (Rechitsa)	3,550	1st (First League)
Torpedo-BelAZ	Zhodino	Torpedo Stadium	6,524	3rd
Vitebsk	Vitebsk	Vitebsky CSK	8,200	12th

1. Three games played at City Stadium in Borisov and one game at FC Minsk Stadium in Minsk.
2. Two games played at SDYuShOR-8 Stadium in Gomel.
3. One game played at FC Minsk Stadium in Minsk.
4. Energetik-BGU spent the season at City Stadium in Borisov due to league's requirement to play on natural grass pitch in the summer. In addition, four games played at RCOP-BGU Stadium in Minsk.
5. Isloch spent the season at City Stadium in Molodechno due to league's requirement to play on natural grass pitch in the summer. In addition, four games played at FC Minsk Stadium in Minsk.
6. Three games played at FC Minsk Stadium.
7. One game played at Yunost Stadium in Brest.
8. Five games played at Shakhtyor Stadium in Soligorsk.
9. Three games played at Slutsk College stadium.
10. Before their withdrawal from the league, Sputnik played three games at Central Stadium in Rechitsa, three games at SDYuShOR-8 Stadium in Gomel, one game at Central Stadium in Gomel and one game at Spartak Stadium in Mogilev.

=== Personnel ===
Team	Manager	Captain	Kit manufacturer	Shirt Sponsor (Chest)
BATE Borisov	(Belarus) Vitaly Zhukovsky	(Belarus) Pavel Nyakhaychyk	Adidas	Minsk Tractor Works
Dynamo Brest	(Belarus) Syarhey Kavalchuk	(Belarus) Edhar Alyakhnovich	Saller	RUPP-Granit
Dinamo Minsk	(Belarus) Artsyom Chelyadzinski (caretaker)	(Belarus) Igor Shitov	Saller	None
Energetik-BGU	(Belarus) Vladimir Belyavskiy	(Belarus) Yevgeniy Yudchits	Adidas	Belenergo
Gomel	(Belarus) Ivan Bionchik	(Belarus) Ruslan Yudenkov	Joma	Belorusneft
Isloch Minsk Raion	(Belarus) Artsyom Radzkow	(Belarus) Dzmitry Kamarowski	Joma	Hyundai
Minsk	(Russia) Fyodor Shcherbachenko	(Belarus) Syarhey Vyeramko	Macron	Minsk Tractor Works
Neman Grodno	(Belarus) Igor Kovalevich	(Belarus) Valery Zhukowski	Saller	None
Rukh Brest	(Belarus) Kirill Alshevsky	(Belarus) Artsyom Rakhmanaw	Joma	Belgosstrakh
Shakhtyor Soligorsk	(Ukraine) Roman Hryhorchuk	(Belarus) Alyaksandr Hutar	Jako	Belaruskali
Slavia Mozyr	(Belarus) Mihail Martsinovich	(Belarus) Mikhail Baranovsky	Joma	Mozyr Oil Refinery
Slutsk	(Belarus) Aleksandr Brazevich	(Belarus) Ilya Branovets	Hummel	Slutsk Sugar Refinery
Smorgon	(Belarus) Vyacheslav Geraschenko	(Russia) Artur Valikayev	Masita	Maxline
Sputnik Rechitsa	(Russia) Viktor Kumykov	(Belarus) Ihar Yasinski	Macron	Stroidiapazon
Torpedo-BelAZ Zhodino	(Belarus) Yuri Puntus	(Belarus) Andrey Khachaturyan	Adidas	BelAZ
Vitebsk	(Belarus) Yevgeniy Chernukhin	(Belarus) Artsyom Skitaw	Macron	None

=== Managerial changes ===
Team	Outgoing manager	Manner of departure	Date of vacancy	Position in table	Incoming manager	Date of appointment
FC Dinamo Minsk	(Belarus) Leonid Kuchuk	Resigned	28 May 2021	4th	(Belarus) Artsyom Chelyadzinski (caretaker)	3 June 2021
FC Sputnik Rechitsa	(Belarus) Vyacheslav Levchuk	Mutual Consent	4 June 2021	16th	(Russia) Viktor Kumykov	4 June 2021

== League table ==
Pos	Team	Pld	W	D	L	GF	GA	GD	Pts	Qualification or relegation
1	Shakhtyor Soligorsk (C)	30	24	3	3	62	18	+44	75	Qualification for the Champions League first qualifying round
2	BATE Borisov	30	19	8	3	61	27	+34	65	Qualification for the Europa Conference League second qualifying round
3	Dinamo Minsk	30	19	5	6	55	20	+35	62	Qualification for the Europa Conference League first qualifying round
4	Gomel (Note: Gomel qualified for the Europa Conference League second qualifying round as the 2021–22 Belarusian Cup winners.)	30	17	8	5	57	23	+34	59	Qualification for the Europa Conference League second qualifying round
5	Rukh Brest (W)	30	16	10	4	52	28	+24	58	Folded after season
6	Dynamo Brest	30	8	14	8	32	32	0	38	
7	Vitebsk	30	9	10	11	37	41	−4	37	
8	Torpedo-BelAZ Zhodino	30	10	6	14	38	43	−5	36	
9	Slutsk	30	9	8	13	36	44	−8	35	
10	Isloch Minsk Raion	30	9	7	14	38	47	−9	34	
11	Neman Grodno	30	9	7	14	36	36	0	34	
12	Minsk	30	8	9	13	32	52	−20	33	
13	Energetik-BGU Minsk	30	8	9	13	35	42	−7	33	
14	Slavia Mozyr (O)	30	8	8	14	42	50	−8	32	Qualification to relegation play-offs
15	Smorgon (R)	30	4	9	17	26	66	−40	21	Relegation to the Belarusian First League
16	Sputnik Rechitsa (W)	30	2	1	27	12	82	−70	7	Folded after season

Source: football.by
Rules for classification: 1) Points; 2) Head-to-head points; 3) Head-to-head goal difference; 4) Head-to-head goals scored; 5) Goal difference; 6) Matches won; 7) Goals scored.
(C) Champions; (O) Play-off winners; (R) Relegated; (W) Withdrawn

== Results ==
Each team plays home-and-away once against every other team for a total of 30 matches played each.

Home \ Away	BAT	DBR	DMI	ENE	GOM	ISL	FCM	NEM	RUH	SHA	SLA	SLU	SMR	SPU	TZH	VIT
BATE Borisov	—	0–2	1–1	2–1	3–2	2–2	1–0	3–0	3–2	1–0	3–0	3–0	1–0	2–1	3–0	4–0
Dynamo Brest	0–0	—	1–1	0–1	1–0	1–0	2–2	1–3	1–1	0–3	0–3	0–0	2–2	3–0	3–2	0–0
Dinamo Minsk	0–2	2–0	—	2–0	1–2	2–1	2–0	2–0	0–1	1–2	4–0	1–0	2–0	3–0	3–0	3–1
Energetik-BGU Minsk	1–1	0–0	0–1	—	3–2	1–1	1–1	1–1	0–2	1–2	2–3	1–0	3–0	0–1	1–1	2–2
Gomel	2–2	0–0	2–0	4–0	—	2–0	5–0	2–0	0–0	2–3	3–0	4–1	0–0	2–0	1–1	4–1
Isloch Minsk Raion	1–4	1–1	1–3	0–4	1–2	—	1–1	2–0	0–1	0–1	1–0	2–0	2–0	3–0	0–0	0–1
Minsk	2–2	1–0	1–3	2–1	0–0	1–0	—	0–5	2–2	0–3	0–6	2–1	2–2	3–0	0–2	3–3
Neman Grodno	0–2	0–2	1–2	3–0	1–0	1–2	0–2	—	0–1	1–2	2–2	1–0	5–0	2–2	3–1	0–0
Rukh Brest	2–2	3–2	1–3	0–0	1–1	7–1	1–0	2–0	—	1–0	2–1	1–0	5–0	2–0	3–0	2–0
Shakhtyor Soligorsk	1–0	1–1	1–0	2–0	0–1	4–0	1–0	1–0	4–1	—	4–1	1–1	3–0	3–0	3–1	2–0
Slavia Mozyr	3–1	1–1	0–0	2–3	2–4	1–1	1–2	1–1	1–1	0–4	—	3–1	1–1	3–0	0–1	0–2
Slutsk	3–4	1–1	1–1	2–0	1–4	2–1	2–2	1–1	3–0	1–4	2–1	—	2–1	3–2	2–0	1–2
Smorgon	1–3	1–1	0–5	2–2	1–2	1–2	1–0	0–2	1–1	2–2	0–2	1–1	—	2–0	1–3	2–0
Sputnik Rechitsa	0–3	0–4	0–5	0–3	0–3	1–5	0–1	0–3	0–3	1–2	0–2	0–3	0–3	—	0–3	4–3
Torpedo-BelAZ Zhodino	0–3	0–2	1–2	0–1	0–1	3–3	2–1	1–1	3–3	0–1	2–0	0–1	7–1	2–0	—	1–0
Vitebsk	0–0	3–1	0–0	3–2	0–0	0–4	3–1	2–0	0–0	1–2	2–2	0–0	5–0	3–0	0–1	—

Source: Football Federation of Belarus (in Russian)
Legend: Blue = home team win; Yellow = draw; Red = away team win.

== Relegation play-offs ==
The 14th-place finisher of this season (Slavia Mozyr) played a two-legged relegation play-off against the third-placed team of the 2021 Belarusian First League (Krumkachy Minsk) for a spot in the 2022 Premier League.

Leg 1

2 December 2021
14:30 GMT+3

Slavia Mozyr	1–0	Krumkachy Minsk
Narh 90+2'

Yunost Stadium, Mazyr

Leg 2

5 December 2021
14:00 GMT+3

Krumkachy Minsk	0–0	Slavia Mozyr

SOK Alimpijski, Minsk

== Statistics ==
=== Top goalscorers ===
As of 20 November 2021

Rank	Player	Club	Goals
1	(The Gambia) Dembo Darboe	Shakhtyor Soligorsk	19
2	(Belarus) Andrey Solovey	Gomel	17
3	(Belarus) Maksim Skavysh	BATE Borisov	13
4	(Ukraine) Stanislav Bilenkyi	Dynamo Brest	11
5	(Senegal) Ablaye Mbengue	Dinamo Minsk	10
6	(Nigeria) Steven Alfred	Slutsk	9
6	(Belarus) Dzyanis Laptsew	Rukh Brest	9
6	(Belarus) Ruslan Teverov	Vitebsk	9
9	(Belarus) Dmitry Gomza	Gomel	8
9	(Belarus) Dzmitry Kamarowski	Isloch	8
9	(Ghana) Francis Narh	Slavia Mozyr	8

=== Hat-tricks ===
Player	For	Against	Result	Date
(Belarus) Dzyanis Laptsew	Rukh Brest	Smorgon	5–0 (H)	18 April 2021
(The Gambia) Dembo Darboe	Shakhtyor Soligorsk	Rukh Brest	4‒1 (H)	25 April 2021
(Senegal) Ablaye Mbengue	Dinamo Minsk	Slavia Mozyr	4–0 (H)	4 July 2021
(Belarus) Andrey Solovey	Gomel	Slutsk	4–1 (A)	18 September 2021

=== Disciplinary ===
Most yellow cards: (8)

- (Brazil) Júlio César (Vitebsk)
- (Georgia (country)) Giorgi Kantaria (Neman Grodno)
- (Kyrgyzstan) Alimardon Shukurov (Neman Grodno)
- (Belarus) Vladislav Yatskevich (Smorgon)
- (Belarus) Igor Tymonyuk (Slavia Mozyr)

Most red cards: (2)

- (Brazil) Júlio César (Vitebsk)
- (Ghana) Sulley Muniru (Minsk)
- (Belarus) Alyaksey Hawrylovich (Neman Grodno)

== Awards ==
=== Weekly awards ===
==== Player of the Week ====
Player of The Week
Week	Player	Club	Reference
1	(Belarus) Syarhey Kislyak	Dinamo Minsk	
2	(Belarus) Dzmitry Kamarowski	Isloch	
3	(Uzbekistan) Shokhboz Umarov	BATE Borisov	
4	(Belarus) Andrey Solovey	Gomel	
5	(Belarus) Dzyanis Laptsew	Rukh Brest	
6	(The Gambia) Dembo Darboe	Shakhtyor Soligorsk	
7	(Belarus) Alyaksandr Sachywka	Shakhtyor Soligorsk	
8	(Brazil) Júlio César	Vitebsk	
9	(Belarus) Denis Gruzhevskiy	Torpedo-BelAZ Zhodino	
10	(Belarus) Ruslan Yudenkov	Gomel	
11	(Belarus) Andrey Solovey	Gomel	

==== Goal of the Week ====
Goal of The Week
Week	Player	Club	Reference
1	(Uzbekistan) Shokhboz Umarov	BATE Borisov	
2	(Belarus) Alyaksandr Sachywka	Shakhtyor Soligorsk	
3	(Belarus) Artsyom Vaskow	Gomel	
4	(Serbia) Nikola Antić	Shakhtyor Soligorsk	
5	(Belarus) Aleksandr Shestyuk	Dynamo Brest	
6	(Belarus) Mikita Nyakrasaw	Gomel	
7	(Ukraine) Stanislav Bilenkyi	Dynamo Brest	
8	(Belarus) Vadim Pobudey	Gomel	
9	(Belarus) Pavel Sedko	Dynamo Brest	
10	(Belarus) Ruslan Yudenkov	Gomel	
11	(Uzbekistan) Shokhboz Umarov	BATE Borisov	

=== Monthly awards ===
==== Player of the Month ====
Player of The Month
Month	Player	Club	Reference
April	(The Gambia) Dembo Darboe	Shakhtyor Soligorsk	

==== Goal of the Month ====
Goal of The Month
Month	Player	Club	Reference
April	(Belarus) Aleksandr Shestyuk	Dynamo Brest	

==== Manager of the Month ====
Manager of The Month
Month	Player	Club	Reference
April	(Ukraine) Roman Hryhorchuk	Shakhtyor Soligorsk	
