= 2022 Belarusian Premier League =

Belarusian Premier League
- Season: 2022
- Dates: 18 March – 12 November 2022
- Champions: ~~Shakhtyor Soligorsk~~
- Relegated: Vitebsk; Dnepr Mogilev
- Champions League: BATE Borisov
- Conference League: Dinamo Minsk; Torpedo-BelAZ Zhodino; Neman Grodno
- Matches: 240
- Goals: 615 (2.56 per match)
- Top goalscorer: Bobur Abdikholikov (26 goals)
- Biggest home win: Energetik-BGU Minsk 5–0 Slavia Mozyr (29 May 2022); Minsk 5–0 Slavia Mozyr (18 October 2022); Slavia Mozyr 5–0 Dnepr Mogilev (12 November 2022)
- Biggest away win: Dnepr Mogilev 0–7 Shakhtyor Soligorsk (15 August 2022)
- Highest scoring: Dynamo Brest 4–4 Vitebsk (29 October 2022)
- Longest winning run: 6 matches Shakhtyor Soligorsk
- Longest unbeaten run: 15 matches Dinamo Minsk
- Longest winless run: 12 matches Dynamo Brest; Vitebsk
- Longest losing run: 9 matches Dnepr Mogilev
- All statistics correct as of 12 November 2022.

The 2022 Belarusian Premier League was the 32nd season of top-tier football in Belarus. Shakhtyor Soligorsk defended their championship winning the fourth league title in club history. The title was subsequently stripped on May 11, 2023 following a match-fixing scandal.

== Teams ==
The 15th-placed team of the last season Smorgon was relegated to the 2022 Belarusian First League, ending their one-year stay in the top division. Sputnik Rechitsa were excluded from the league halfway through the last season and will not play in any league in 2022. Smorgon and Sputnik were replaced by two best teams of 2021 Belarusian First League (Arsenal Dzerzhinsk, promoted to the top-flight for the first time in their history and Belshina Bobruisk, promoted after a one-year absence).

On 28 February 2022 Rukh Brest withdrew from the league, citing financial troubles caused by international sanctions upon club's owner Alexander Zaytsev and an undisclosed Russian company co-owning the club. A few days later they were replaced by Dnepr Mogilev (5th-placed team of last year's First League season).

Team	Location	Venue	Capacity	Position in 2021
Arsenal	Dzerzhinsk	Gorodeya Stadium (Gorodeya)	1,625	1st (First League)
BATE	Borisov	Borisov Arena	12,896	2nd
Belshina	Bobruisk	Spartak Stadium	3,700	2nd (First League)
Gomel	Gomel	Central Stadium	14,307	4th
Dinamo Brest	Brest	OSK Brestsky	10,060	6th
Dinamo Minsk	Minsk	Dinamo Stadium	22,000	3rd
Dnepr	Mogilev	Spartak Stadium	7,350	5th (First League)
Energetik-BGU	Minsk	RCOR-BGU Stadium	1,500	13th
Isloch	Minsk Raion	FC Minsk Stadium	3,000	10th
Minsk	Minsk	FC Minsk Stadium	3,000	12th
Neman	Grodno	Neman Stadium	8,500	11th
Shakhtyor	Soligorsk	Stroitel Stadium	4,200	1st
Slavia	Mozyr	Yunost Stadium	5,300	14th
Slutsk	Slutsk	City Stadium	1,896	9th
Torpedo-BelAZ	Zhodino	Torpedo Stadium	3,020	8th
Vitebsk	Vitebsk	Vitebsky CSK	8,100	7th

Locations of the 2022 Belarusian Premier League teams

== League table ==
Pos	Team	Pld	W	D	L	GF	GA	GD	Pts	Qualification or relegation
1	Shakhtyor Soligorsk	30	20	5	5	55	17	+38	65	Excluded from European competitions (Note: Shakhtyor Soligorsk and Energetik-BGU Minsk were both found guilty of match-fixing by the Football Federation of Belarus and were denied UEFA licenses: as a result, the Champions League spot reserved for the first-placed team was awarded to the third-placed team, BATE Borisov, and the Europa Conference League spots reserved for the second and third-placed teams were awarded to the fourth and fifth-placed teams, Dinamo Minsk and Isloch Minsk Raion. Isloch Minsk Raion were later excluded from to Europa Conference League after being found gulity of match-fixing dating from 2016: after FC Gomel and FC Minsk declined to apply for UEFA licences, the final Europa Conference League place was awarded to ninth-placed Neman Grodno.)
2	Energetik-BGU Minsk	30	18	6	6	50	27	+23	60	Excluded from European competitions
3	BATE Borisov	30	16	11	3	51	21	+30	59	Qualification for the Champions League first qualifying round
4	Dinamo Minsk	30	16	11	3	50	25	+25	59	Qualification for the Europa Conference League first qualifying round
5	Isloch Minsk Raion	30	16	6	8	51	33	+18	54	Excluded from European competitions
6	Minsk	30	12	8	10	47	43	+4	44	Excluded from European competitions
7	Gomel	30	12	7	11	36	37	−1	43	Excluded from European competitions
8	Torpedo-BelAZ Zhodino	30	11	10	9	35	32	+3	43	Qualification for the Europa Conference League second qualifying round (Note: Torpedo-BelAZ Zhodino qualified to the Europa Conference League as Cup Winners.)
9	Neman Grodno	30	9	13	8	39	36	+3	40	Qualification for the Europa Conference League first qualifying round
10	Slavia Mozyr	30	10	7	13	42	46	−4	37	
11	Slutsk	30	7	11	12	26	41	−15	32	
12	Belshina Bobruisk	30	6	12	12	37	50	−13	30	
13	Dynamo Brest	30	5	12	13	29	43	−14	27	
14	Arsenal Dzerzhinsk (R)	30	5	8	17	18	42	−24	23	Qualification to relegation play-offs
15	Vitebsk (R)	30	4	10	16	28	49	−21	22	Relegation to the Belarusian First League
16	Dnepr Mogilev (R)	30	3	3	24	21	73	−52	12	Relegation to the Belarusian First League

Source: football.by Soccerway
Rules for classification: 1) Points; 2) Head-to-head points; 3) Head-to-head goal difference; 4) Head-to-head goals scored; 5) Goal difference; 6) Matches won; 7) Goals scored.
(R) Relegated

== Results ==
Each team plays home-and-away once against every other team for a total of 30 matches played each.

Home \ Away	ARS	BAT	BSH	DBR	DMI	DNE	ENE	GOM	ISL	FCM	NEM	SHA	SLA	SLU	TZH	VIT
Arsenal Dzerzhinsk	—	0–2	0–0	0–2	0–1	1–0	0–2	1–2	1–3	0–0	1–1	1–2	3–2	1–1	1–2	0–0
BATE Borisov	1–2	—	2–2	4–1	0–0	2–1	1–1	2–1	0–1	3–2	2–1	0–2	4–0	4–0	1–1	2–1
Belshina Bobruisk	1–0	0–3	—	2–2	0–0	0–0	0–1	2–3	2–1	2–2	1–0	1–2	1–4	0–2	1–3	2–2
Dynamo Brest	0–0	0–3	1–1	—	1–3	4–0	1–2	1–1	2–2	3–1	0–0	1–1	1–3	0–0	0–1	4–4
Dinamo Minsk	1–1	2–2	0–0	0–0	—	4–0	1–4	3–0	1–2	3–1	2–0	1–0	0–0	1–1	2–2	2–1
Dnepr Mogilev	0–1	0–3	4–3	2–0	0–2	—	0–2	0–4	0–2	2–4	1–3	0–7	1–3	1–2	0–1	2–1
Energetik-BGU Minsk	0–1	0–2	3–1	0–0	1–3	1–1	—	0–0	1–2	2–0	2–1	0–1	5–0	1–1	3–1	3–1
Gomel	4–1	0–1	0–3	1–0	0–1	3–1	1–2	—	3–1	0–3	3–0	0–3	0–2	1–0	1–0	1–0
Isloch Minsk Raion	2–1	0–0	2–0	1–2	2–2	3–2	2–3	1–1	—	2–0	1–1	1–1	0–2	1–2	3–0	2–0
Minsk	2–0	2–2	2–4	2–0	0–1	1–0	0–0	1–1	1–5	—	3–2	1–0	5–0	1–0	1–0	2–0
Neman Grodno	2–0	0–0	2–2	2–1	2–3	2–0	1–4	3–0	1–0	1–1	—	1–1	2–0	1–0	2–0	1–1
Shakhtyor Soligorsk	3–0	0–1	4–1*	2–0	1–0	4–0	0–1	1–0	1–0	2–1	2–2	—	1–1	2–1	0–1	2–0
Slavia Mozyr	1–1	0–3	2–0	3–1	1–2	5–0	0–1	0–1	0–1	4–2	1–1	1–3	—	1–1	2–2	0–2
Slutsk	1–0	0–0	0–0	2–0	0–5	2–2	1–2	2–2	2–4	2–4	0–0	0–1	1–0	—	1–1	0–2
Torpedo-BelAZ Zhodino	1–0	0–0	1–3	0–0	3–4	1–0	4–0	1–1	0–1	1–1	2–2	0–1	1–1	3–0	—	1–0
Vitebsk	3–0	1–1	2–2	0–1	0–0	2–1	0–3	1–1	1–3	1–1	2–2	0–5	0–3	0–1	0–1	—

Source: Football Federation of Belarus (in Russian) Soccerway
Legend: Blue = home team win; Yellow = draw; Red = away team win.

== Relegation play-offs ==
The 14th-place finisher of this season (Arsenal Dzerzhinsk) plays a two-legged relegation play-off against the third-placed team of the 2022 Belarusian First League (Rogachev) for a spot in the 2023 Premier League.

16 November 2022
18:00 MSK

Arsenal Dzerzhinsk	3–2	Rogachev
Senko 13'; Guletskiy 45' (pen.); Rassadkin 84'	Report	Kortsov 54', 89' (pen.)

Gorodeya Stadium, Haradzeya
20 November 2022
13:00 MSK

Rogachev	3–1	Arsenal Dzerzhinsk
Kortsov 6'; Bury 61'; Trachynski 73'		Senko 53'

Referee: Sergey Krasnikov

Rogachev won 5–4 on aggregate.

== Top scorers ==
As of 12 November 2022

Rank	Player	Club	Goals
1	(Uzbekistan) Bobur Abdikholikov	Energetik-BGU Minsk	26
2	(Belarus) Uladzimir Khvashchynski	Minsk	21
3	(Belarus) Ivan Bakhar	Dinamo Minsk	11
4	(Belarus) Gleb Zherdev	Slavia Mozyr	10
4	(Belarus) Stanislaw Drahun	BATE Borisov	10
4	(Niger) Daniel Sosah	Isloch Minsk Raion	10
7	(Belarus) Maksim Skavysh	Shakhtyor Soligorsk	9
7	(Russia) Ilya Vasilyev	Belshina	9
7	(Belarus) Pavel Savitski	Neman Grodno	9
10	(Montenegro) Dušan Bakić	Dinamo Minsk	8
10	(Belarus) Yahor Zubovich	Neman Grodno	8
10	(Belarus) Yegor Bogomolsky	Minsk	8
10	(Belarus) Alyaksandr Makas	Gomel	8
10	(Belarus) Valery Gorbachik	Torpedo-BelAZ Zhodino	8

== Awards ==
=== Weekly awards ===
==== Player of the Week ====
Player of The Week
Week	Player	Club	Reference
1	(Belarus) Dmitry Bessmertny	Bate Borisov	
2	(Uzbekistan) Bobur Abdikholikov	Energetik-BGU Minsk	
