= 2019 Belarusian Premier League =

Belarusian Premier League
- Season: 2019
- Dates: 29 March – 1 December 2019
- Champions: Dynamo Brest
- Relegated: Dnyapro Mogilev; Gomel; Torpedo Minsk
- Champions League: Dynamo Brest
- Europa League: BATE Borisov; Shakhtyor Soligorsk
- Matches: 240
- Goals: 631 (2.63 per match)
- Top goalscorer: 19 – Ilya Shkurin (Energetik-BGU Minsk)

The 2019 Belarusian Premier League was the 29th season of top-tier football in Belarus. BATE Borisov were the defending champions, having won their 13th consecutive league title and 15th overall last year. Dynamo Brest won the Belarusian Premier League title for the first time, ending the BATE Borisov streak.

== Teams ==
Locations of the 2019 Belarusian Premier League teams

The bottom two teams from the 2018 season (Smolevichi and Dnepr Mogilev) were relegated to the 2019 Belarusian First League. They were replaced by Slavia Mozyr and Energetik-BGU, champions and runners-up of the 2018 Belarusian First League respectively.

In spring 2019, Luch Minsk merged with Dnepr Mogilev. The united club was named Dnyapro Mogilev. It inherited Luch's Premier League spot and licence, their sponsorships and most of the squad, while keeping only a few of Dnepr players and relocating to Mogilev. Dnepr continued its participation in youth tournaments independently from Luch.

Team	Location	Stadium	Capacity
BATE Borisov	Borisov	Borisov Arena	13,121
Dynamo Brest	Brest	OSK Brestsky	10,060
Dinamo Minsk	Minsk	Dinamo Stadium	22,324
Dnyapro Mogilev	Mogilev	Spartak Stadium	7,350
Energetik-BGU	Minsk	RCOR-BGU Stadium	1,500
Gomel	Gomel	Central Stadium	14,307
Gorodeya	Gorodeya	Gorodeya Stadium	1,625
Isloch Minsk Raion	Minsk Raion	FC Minsk Stadium	3,100
Minsk	Minsk	FC Minsk Stadium	3,000
Neman Grodno	Grodno	Neman Stadium	8,479
Shakhtyor Soligorsk	Soligorsk	Stroitel Stadium	4,200
Slavia Mozyr	Mozyr	Yunost Stadium	5,300
Slutsk	Slutsk	City Stadium	1,896
Torpedo-BelAZ Zhodino	Zhodino	Torpedo Stadium	6,524
Torpedo Minsk	Minsk	FC Minsk Stadium	3,000
Vitebsk	Vitebsk	Vitebsky CSK	8,144

1. Six games played at Traktor Stadium and one game at FC Minsk Stadium.
2. Three games played at FC Minsk Stadium.
3. One game played at Slutsk College stadium.
4. Torpedo Minsk played four games at FC Minsk Stadium and three games at Traktor Stadium before withdrawal from the tournament.

== League table ==
Pos	Team	Pld	W	D	L	GF	GA	GD	Pts	Qualification or relegation
1	Dynamo Brest (C)	30	23	6	1	70	22	+48	75	Qualification for the Champions League first qualifying round
2	BATE Borisov	30	22	4	4	61	21	+40	70	Qualification for the Europa League second qualifying round
3	Shakhtyor Soligorsk	30	20	5	5	59	21	+38	65	Qualification for the Europa League first qualifying round
4	Dinamo Minsk	30	15	5	10	43	39	+4	50	Qualification for the Europa League first qualifying round
5	Isloch Minsk Raion	30	13	8	9	42	36	+6	47	
6	Torpedo-BelAZ Zhodino	30	13	6	11	41	36	+5	45	
7	Gorodeya	30	12	8	10	31	29	+2	44	
8	Slavia Mozyr	30	10	7	13	35	40	−5	37	
9	Minsk	30	9	9	12	36	44	−8	36	
10	Neman Grodno	30	10	6	14	28	37	−9	36	
11	Slutsk	30	9	7	14	29	46	−17	34	
12	Energetik-BGU Minsk	30	8	9	13	52	66	−14	33	
13	Vitebsk	30	8	7	15	24	39	−15	31	
14	Dnyapro Mogilev (R)	30	8	6	16	32	42	−10	30	Qualification to relegation play-offs
15	Gomel (R)	30	7	8	15	44	50	−6	29	Relegation to the Belarusian First League
16	Torpedo Minsk (Note: Torpedo Minsk folded after 15 games due to lack of funds. Their remaining matches were awarded to their opponents by 3-0.) (R)	30	1	3	26	4	63	−59	6	Club folded during season

Source: football.by
Rules for classification: 1) Points; 2) Head-to-head points; 3) Head-to-head goal difference; 4) Head-to-head goals scored; 5) Goal difference; 6) Matches won; 7) Goals scored.
(C) Champions; (R) Relegated

== Results ==
Each team plays home-and-away once against every other team for a total of 30 matches played each.

Home \ Away	BAT	DBR	DMI	DNY	ENE	GOM	GRD	ISL	FCM	NEM	SHA	SLA	SLU	TZH	TMN	VIT
BATE Borisov	—	0–1	3–0	2–0	4–1	1–1	2–1	2–4	1–0	1–0	3–1	4–0	3–0	4–1	1–0	3–0
Dynamo Brest	1–1	—	1–2	3–1	6–2	3–0	4–0	5–1	3–0	6–1	1–1	0–0	3–2	4–1	3–0 (Note: The opponents of Torpedo Minsk awarded a 3–0 w/o win after Torpedo withdrew from the league.)	1–0
Dinamo Minsk	1–2	1–3	—	3–0	6–1	3–1	1–0	1–0	3–2	0–1	1–1	1–0	2–1	0–3	3–0	0–2
Dnyapro Mogilev	0–1	0–1	0–2	—	3–4	1–1	0–0	3–0	1–0	0–3	2–0	1–2	2–0	2–1	3–0	2–0
Energetik-BGU	0–4	1–1	3–3	5–3	—	1–1	0–0	1–2	3–3	2–4	1–2	1–2	0–1	2–1	2–1	2–0
Gomel	0–2	1–2	0–1	0–0	3–0	—	0–0	2–2	1–0	2–3	0–1	2–2	3–4	2–3	3–0	1–2
Gorodeya	1–0	1–3	3–1	3–2	1–0	2–3	—	1–2	1–2	1–0	0–0	1–0	1–0	0–3	0–0	1–1
Isloch Minsk Raion	0–0	1–1	1–1	1–1	2–1	3–1	2–0	—	1–1	1–0	0–1	2–1	0–1	1–0	3–0	3–0
Minsk	3–2	1–2	0–0	0–0	1–6	3–2	0–3	3–3	—	2–1	1–0	1–0	1–0	2–0	3–0	0–0
Neman Grodno	0–1	0–1	0–1	1–0	1–1	1–1	1–3	1–1	1–0	—	0–3	0–1	0–0	0–0	3–0	1–0
Shakhtyor Soligorsk	2–2	0–0	3–0	3–1	3–4	3–1	1–0	1–0	3–2	6–0	—	5–1	1–0	3–0	1–0	4–0
Slavia Mozyr	1–2	2–4	1–1	1–0	2–2	3–2	0–1	2–0	4–3	0–1	0–1	—	1–1	1–2	2–0	0–1
Slutsk	0–3	1–3	2–1	2–2	0–0	0–6	0–0	1–3	1–0	2–1	0–5	0–0	—	1–2	1–0	3–0
Torpedo-BelAZ Zhodino	1–2	1–2	4–0	1–0	3–3	2–0	1–1	1–3	1–1	1–0	0–1	1–1	1–0	—	2–0	1–0
Torpedo Minsk	0–3	0–1	0–1	0–1	0–3	1–2	0–3	1–0	0–0	0–3	0–3	0–3	0–3	0–3	—	0–3
Vitebsk	1–2	0–1	1–3	2–1	3–0	1–2	0–2	2–0	1–1	0–0	1–0	0–2	2–2	0–0	1–1	—

Source: Football Federation of Belarus (in Russian)
Legend: Blue = home team win; Yellow = draw; Red = away team win.

== Relegation play-offs ==
The 14th-place finisher of this season (Dnyapro Mogilev) played a two-legged relegation play-off against the third team of the 2019 Belarusian First League (Rukh Brest) for one spot in the 2020 Premier League. Rukh Brest won the series on penalties and got promoted, while Dnyapro Mogilev were relegated.

5 December 2019
14:00 GMT+3

Rukh Brest	2–1	Dnyapro Mogilev
Morozov 68', 90+4'	Report	Shilo 62'

Yunost Stadium, Brest
Attendance: 1,100
Referee: Aleksei Kulbakov (Gomel)

8 December 2019
14:00 GMT+3

Dnyapro Mogilev	2–1 (a.e.t.)	Rukh Brest
Gribovskiy 47'; Marušić 79'	Report	Morozov 80'
Penalties
Yashin (penalty scored); Zaleski (penalty scored); Batyschev (penalty missed); Marušić (penalty missed); Kazlow (penalty scored); Kats (penalty scored); Savastsyanaw (penalty missed)	4–5	(penalty scored) Kalpachuk; (penalty missed) Oreshkevich; (penalty scored) Dzemidovich; (penalty scored) Bukatkin; (penalty missed) Morozov; (penalty scored) Sibilev; (penalty scored) Grechikho

Spartak Stadium, Mogilev
Attendance: 3,500
Referee: Denis Scherbakov (Minsk)

== Top goalscorers ==
Updated to games played on 1 December 2019
Source: football.by

Rank	Goalscorer	Team	Goals
1	(Belarus) Ilya Shkurin	Energetik-BGU Minsk	19
2	(Belarus) Stanislaw Drahun	BATE Borisov	14
2	(Ukraine) Vitaliy Kvashuk	Gomel	14
4	(Belarus) Dzyanis Laptsew	Dynamo Brest	12
4	(Belarus) Pavel Nyakhaychyk	Dynamo Brest	12
6	(Guinea) Momo Yansane	Isloch Minsk Raion	11
6	(Belarus) Mikalay Yanush	Shakhtyor Soligorsk	11
8	(Albania) Elis Bakaj	Shakhtyor Soligorsk	10
8	(Belarus) Alyaksandr Makas	Isloch Minsk Raion	10
8	(Belarus) Maksim Skavysh	BATE Borisov	10
8	(Belarus) Ihar Stasevich	BATE Borisov	10
8	(Ukraine) Oleksandr Vasylyev	Minsk	10
