= Ilya Matalyha =

Belarusian footballer

Personal information
- Date of birth: 5 May 1984 (age 42)
- Place of birth: Bobruisk, Mogilev Oblast, Byelorussian SSR, Soviet Union
- Height: 1.86 m (6 ft 1 in)
- Position: Goalkeeper

Team information
- Current team: KS Raszyn
- Number: 1

Youth career
- 2002–2004: Belshina Bobruisk

Senior career*
Years	Team	Apps	(Gls)
2002	Starye Dorogi	4	(0)
2004	Granit Mikashevichi	15	(0)
2005–2008	Belshina Bobruisk	67	(0)
2009–2010	Dnepr Mogilev	0	(0)
2011–2012	Slovácko	2	(0)
2013	Smorgon	4	(0)
2013	Gorodeya	7	(0)
2014	Zhlobin	24	(0)
2015	Belshina Bobruisk	0	(0)
2017–2018	Belshina Bobruisk	7	(0)
2019	Sputnik Rechitsa	7	(0)
2020–2021	Orsha	43	(0)
2022	Veles-2020 Vitebsk	19	(0)
2023–	KS Raszyn	57	(0)
- * Club domestic league appearances and goals as of 20:43, 19 June 2025 (UTC)

Ilya Matalyha (Belarusian: Ілья Маталыга; Russian: Илья Моталыго; born 5 May 1984) is a Belarusian professional footballer who plays as a goalkeeper for Polish club KS Raszyn.
