= Pavlovets =

Pavlovets (Belarusian: Паўлавец, Russian: Павловец) is a surname of Slavic-language origin. Notable people with this surname include:

- Aleksandr Pavlovets (born 1996), Belarusian footballer
- Maksim Pavlovets (born 1996), Belarusian footballer
