= Sergey Drozd =

Belarusian professional footballer

Personal information
- Date of birth: 24 June 1983 (age 43)
- Place of birth: Molodechno, Belarusian SSR
- Height: 1.73 m (5 ft 8 in)
- Position: Defender

Team information
- Current team: Molodechno
- Number: 3

Youth career
- 2000–2001: Molodechno-2000

Senior career*
Years	Team	Apps	(Gls)
2000	Zabudova Chist	1	(0)
2001–2004	Molodechno-2000	66	(1)
2005–2008	Khimik Svetlogorsk	77	(0)
2008	→ PMC Postavy (loan)	6	(0)
2009–2010	Molodechno	54	(1)
2011–2014	Slutsk	64	(1)
2015	Khimik Svetlogorsk	24	(0)
2016–2019	Molodechno	54	(2)
2019	Underdog Chist	12	(1)
2020–	Molodechno	60	(6)
- * Club domestic league appearances and goals as of 31 December 2023

Sergey Drozd (Belarusian: Сяргей Дрозд; Russian: Сергей Дрозд; born 24 June 1983) is a Belarusian professional footballer who plays for Molodechno.
