= Vladislav Knotko-Shterk =

Belarusian footballer

Personal information
- Date of birth: 1 July 1995 (age 31)
- Place of birth: Minsk, Belarus
- Height: 1.87 m (6 ft 1 1/2 in)
- Position: Defender

Youth career
- 2010–2013: Minsk
- 2013–2016: Torpedo-BelAZ Zhodino

Senior career*
Years	Team	Apps	(Gls)
2016–2017	Luch Minsk	18	(2)
2017	Krumkachy Minsk	4	(0)
2018	Smolevichi	0	(0)
2019	Molodechno	25	(25)
2020	Ostrovets	16	(6)
- * Club domestic league appearances and goals as of 31 December 2020

Vladislav Knotko-Shterk (Belarusian: Уладзіслаў Кнацько-Штэрк; Russian: Владислав Кнотько-Штерк; born 1 July 1995) is a Belarusian former professional footballer.
