= Dmitry Vashkel =

Belarusian footballer

Personal information
- Date of birth: 3 January 1993 (age 33)
- Place of birth: Sharkawshchyna, Vitebsk Oblast, Belarus
- Height: 1.84 m (6 ft 1/2 in)
- Position: Midfielder

Team information
- Current team: Krumkachy Minsk

Youth career
- 2011–2013: Naftan Novopolotsk

Senior career*
Years	Team	Apps	(Gls)
2013	Naftan Novopolotsk	2	(0)
2014–2015	Volna Pinsk	28	(0)
2015–2016	Khimik Svetlogorsk	32	(5)
2017–2020	Lokomotiv Gomel	103	(10)
2022	Ostrovets	19	(1)
2023	Maxline Vitebsk	14	(1)
2023–	Krumkachy Minsk	12	(3)
- * Club domestic league appearances and goals as of 31 December 2023

Dmitry Vashkel (Belarusian: Дзмiтры Вашкель; Russian: Дмитрий Вашкель; born 3 January 1993) is a Belarusian footballer playing currently for Krumkachy Minsk.
