= Yevgeniy Semenchuk =

Belarusian footballer (born 2001)

Personal information
- Date of birth: 22 June 2001 (age 25)
- Place of birth: Grodno, Belarus
- Height: 1.90 m (6 ft 3 in)
- Position: Defender

Team information
- Current team: Pogoń Świebodzin
- Number: 2

Youth career
- 2015–2017: Neman Grodno
- 2018–2021: Dinamo Minsk

Senior career*
Years	Team	Apps	(Gls)
2021	Dinamo Minsk	0	(0)
2021	→ Sputnik Rechitsa (loan)	4	(0)
2022–2023	Bug Hanna	24	(1)
2023–2025	Odra Bytom Odrzański	26	(0)
2025	Stal Jasień	16	(1)
2025–	Pogoń Świebodzin	12	(1)

International career
2017	Belarus U17	1	(0)
- * Club domestic league appearances and goals as of 18:45, 28 February 2026 (UTC)

Yevgeniy Semenchuk (Belarusian: Яўген Семянчук; Russian: Евгений Семенчук; born 22 June 2001) is a Belarusian professional footballer who plays as a defender for Polish IV liga Lubusz club Pogoń Świebodzin.

== Honours ==
Stal Jasień

- IV liga Lubusz: 2024–25
