= Daniil Vigovskiy =

Russian footballer

Personal information
- Full name: Daniil Sergeyevich Vigovskiy
- Date of birth: 27 March 2001 (age 25)
- Place of birth: Luhansk, Ukraine
- Height: 1.80 m (5 ft 11 in)
- Position: Midfielder

Youth career
- –2015: Zorya Luhansk
- 2015–2016: Rotor Volgograd
- 2016–2018: Spartak Moscow

Senior career*
Years	Team	Apps	(Gls)
2019–2021	Energetik-BGU Minsk	12	(1)
2021	Spartaks Jūrmala	12	(0)
2022	Znamya Truda Orekhovo-Zuyevo	14	(2)
2023	Khimki-M	9	(0)
2023–2024	Dnepr Mogilev	34	(4)
- * Club domestic league appearances and goals as of 4 December 2024

Daniil Sergeyevich Vigovskiy (Russian: Даниил Сергеевич Виговский; born 27 March 2001) is a Russian football player.
