= 2020 Belarusian Second League =

Belarusian Second League
- Season: 2020

2020 Belarusian Second League is the 30th season of 3rd tier football in Belarus. It started in April and will finish in November 2020.

== Group A ==
=== League table ===
Pos	Team	Pld	W	D	L	GF	GA	GD	Pts	Promotion or relegation
1	Molodechno	20	15	3	2	59	18	+41	48	Advance to the promotion group
2	Baranovichi	20	14	2	4	74	24	+50	44	Advance to the promotion group
3	Stenles Pinsk	20	13	4	3	61	24	+37	43	Advance to the promotion group
4	Dinamo Malorita	20	13	2	5	71	29	+42	41	
5	Ostrovets	20	11	2	7	48	25	+23	35	
6	Meliorator Zhitkovichi	20	11	2	7	43	29	+14	35	
7	Ivatsevichi	20	8	2	10	42	52	−10	26	
8	BGU Minsk	20	4	3	13	35	45	−10	15	
9	Pershiy Regien	20	4	2	14	17	78	−61	14	
10	Kronon	20	2	6	12	22	65	−43	12	
11	Chayka Zelva	20	0	2	18	12	95	−83	2	

Source: football.by
Rules for classification: 1) Points; 2) Head-to-head points; 3) Head-to-head goal difference; 4) Head-to-head goals scored; 5) Goal difference; 6) Matches won; 7) Goals scored.

=== Results ===
Home \ Away	STP	BAR	MOL	DNM	MLZ	OST	IVA	PER	BGU	KRN	CHA
Stenles Pinsk				4–1	2–1			1–0	3–1	7–0	15–0
Baranovichi	1–1		2–1	2–3	4–1	2–0	9–1	5–0	6–0	3–1	13–0
Molodechno	3–2					2–0	5–0				6–0
Dinamo Malorita		2–3	2–2		0–2		5–1	9–1	3–0		
Meliorator Zhitkovichi			1–1	0–3			2–0	5–1	2–1		
Ostrovets	1–1			2–2	1–2		0–3			2–0	8–0
Ivatsevichi	1–3				3–0	2–3				1–1	8–0
Pershiy Regien			3–0			1–0	1–9		1–11	1–1	
BGU Minsk	1–3		1–4			0–3	0–1	2–1			6–0
Kronon			0–6	2–3	1–2	0–2		1–1	3–3		
Chayka Zelva	1–2		2–4	0–4	0–5			0–1		2–2	

Updated to match(es) played on 1 August 2020. Source: Soccerway
Legend: Blue = home team win; Yellow = draw; Red = away team win.

== Group B ==
=== League table ===
Pos	Team	Pld	W	D	L	GF	GA	GD	Pts	Promotion or relegation
1	Dnepr Mogilev	20	19	0	1	105	9	+96	57	Advance to the promotion group
2	Shakhtyor Petrikov	20	16	1	3	80	16	+64	49	Advance to the promotion group
3	Osipovichi	20	12	1	7	44	35	+9	37	Advance to the promotion group
4	Gorki	20	10	5	5	35	21	+14	35	
5	Viktoriya Maryina Gorka	20	9	4	7	43	37	+6	31	
6	Dnepr Rogachev	20	9	3	8	46	45	+1	30	
7	SMI Autotrans	20	8	2	10	45	53	−8	26	
8	Bumprom	20	7	3	10	29	51	−22	24	
9	Polotsk	20	4	1	15	27	78	−51	13	
10	Energosbyt-BSATU	20	2	3	15	28	59	−31	9	
11	Zhlobin	20	2	1	17	14	92	−78	7	

Source: football.by
Rules for classification: 1) Points; 2) Head-to-head points; 3) Head-to-head goal difference; 4) Head-to-head goals scored; 5) Goal difference; 6) Matches won; 7) Goals scored.

=== Results ===
Home \ Away	BUM	DPM	DPR	ENE	GOR	OSI	POL	SMI	SHA	VIK	ZHL
Bumprom		0–5			0–6		2–0	5–3	1–3		4–0
Dnepr Mogilev						2–0	7–0		2–1	9–1	14–0
Dnepr Rogachev	0–1	1–5			1–1			1–2		1–1	
Energosbyt-BSATU	1–1	2–6	1–3		0–2	2–1					
Gorki		0–2	0–0				5–0	1–0	1–4		3–1
Osipovichi	2–0	0–3	3–1	4–3	1–3			2–0			
Polotsk	0–4		8–2	2–2		3–4				0–3	5–1
SMI Autotrans		0–7		3–2			4–0		0–3	1–1	10–1
Shakhtyor Petrikov				2–0			6–1	7–1		5–2	12–0
Viktoriya Maryina Gorka	3–0		4–0	2–2	2–0	2–2					
Zhlobin			3–4	2–1	0–3	0–5	1–0			1–3	

Updated to match(es) played on 1 August 2020. Source: Soccerway
Legend: Blue = home team win; Yellow = draw; Red = away team win.

== Promotion group ==
Pos	Team	Pld	W	D	L	GF	GA	GD	Pts	Promotion or relegation
1	Dnepr Mogilev	10	9	1	0	25	3	+22	28	Promotion to the Belarusian First League
2	Shakhtyor Petrikov	10	6	1	3	24	10	+14	19	Promotion to the Belarusian First League
3	Molodechno	10	4	1	5	15	20	−5	13	Advance to the promotion play-offs
4	Baranovichi	10	2	4	4	14	23	−9	10	
5	Osipovichi	10	3	0	7	14	27	−13	9	
6	Stenles Pinsk	10	1	3	6	9	18	−9	6	

Updated to match(es) played on 10 October 2020. Source: football.by
Rules for classification: 1) Points; 2) Head-to-head points; 3) Head-to-head goal difference; 4) Head-to-head goals scored; 5) Goal difference; 6) Matches won; 7) Goals scored.
