= Nikita Knyshev =

Russian footballer (born 2003)

Personal information
- Full name: Nikita Ivanovich Knyshev
- Date of birth: 2 October 2003 (age 23)
- Place of birth: Anapa, Krasnodar Krai, Russia
- Height: 1.87 m (6 ft 2 in)
- Position: Midfielder

Team information
- Current team: SKA-1938 Minsk
- Number: 80

Youth career
- –2017: Krasnodar
- 2018: DYuSSh No.1 Anapa
- 2019–2020: Football academy Krasnodar
- 2021–2023: Master-Saturn Yegoryevsk

Senior career*
| Years | Team | Apps | (Gls) |
| 2018 | Anapa (amateur) | | |
| 2023–2024 | Leon Saturn Ramenskoye | 31 | (2) |
| 2025 | Isloch Minsk Raion | 22 | (1) |
| 2026– | SKA-1938 Minsk | 14 | (0) |
- * Club domestic league appearances and goals as of 6 July 2026

Nikita Ivanovich Knyshev (Russian: Никита Иванович Кнышев; born 2 October 2003) is a Russian footballer who plays as a midfielder for SKA-1938 Minsk.

== Career ==
He made his debut in the Russian Second League for Leon Saturn Ramenskoye on 22 July 2023, in a game against Kolomna.

He made his debut in the Belarusian Premier League for Isloch Minsk Raion on 14 March 2025 in a game against Slavia Mozyr.
