= Artur Kats =

Belarusian footballer

Personal information
- Date of birth: 26 December 1994 (age 31)
- Place of birth: Minsk, Belarus
- Height: 1.75 m (5 ft 9 in)
- Position: Left back

Team information
- Current team: Unixlabs Minsk
- Number: 17

Youth career
- 2013–2014: BATE Borisov

Senior career*
Years	Team	Apps	(Gls)
2015–2016	BATE Borisov	0	(0)
2015	→ Gorodeya (loan)	5	(0)
2016	→ Smolevichi-STI (loan)	20	(1)
2017–2018	Luch Minsk	41	(10)
2019	Dnyapro Mogilev	12	(0)
2020	Vitebsk	6	(0)
2021	Belshina Bobruisk	20	(0)
2022–2023	Naftan Novopolotsk	26	(2)
2023–2025	Molodechno	57	(2)
2025–	Unixlabs Minsk	13	(2)
- * Club domestic league appearances and goals as of 6 July 2026

Artur Kats (Belarusian: Артур Кац; Russian: Артур Кац; born 21 May 1991) is a Belarusian professional footballer who plays for Unixlabs Minsk.
