= Yegor Troyakov =

Belarusian footballer

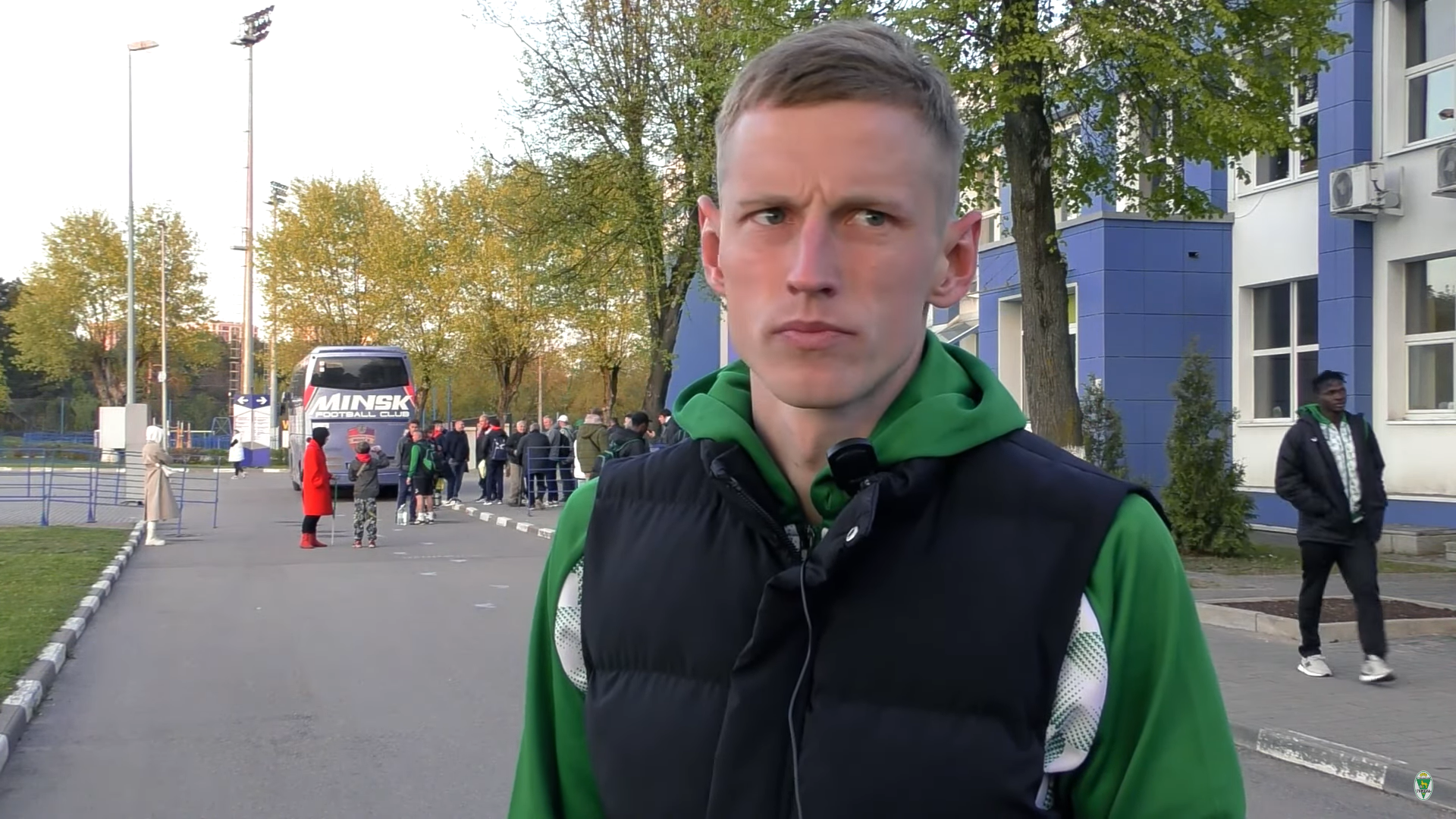

Personal information
- Date of birth: 24 February 1995 (age 31)
- Place of birth: Gomel, Belarus
- Height: 1.83 m (6 ft 0 in)
- Position: Defender

Team information
- Current team: Gomel
- Number: 30

Youth career
- 2009–2015: Gomel

Senior career*
Years	Team	Apps	(Gls)
2015–2020	Gomel	45	(2)
2019	→ Sputnik Rechitsa (loan)	11	(0)
2019	→ Smorgon (loan)	10	(1)
2021	Volna Pinsk	31	(5)
2022	Belshina Bobruisk	29	(5)
2023–	Gomel	55	(2)
- * Club domestic league appearances and goals as of 1 December 2025

Yegor Troyakov (Belarusian: Ягор Траякоў; Russian: Егор Трояков; born 24 February 1995) is a Belarusian professional footballer who plays for Gomel.
