= Jean Morel Poé =

Ivorian association football player (born 1996)

Personal information
- Full name: Jean–Morel Poé
- Date of birth: 15 December 1996 (age 29)
- Place of birth: Bingerville, Ivory Coast
- Height: 1.84 m (6 ft 1/2 in)
- Position: Right winger

Team information
- Current team: Irtysh Pavlodar
- Number: 97

Senior career*
Years	Team	Apps	(Gls)
2015–2016	Williamsville AC		
2017–2018	ASEC Mimosas		
2018	→ Torpedo-BelAZ Zhodino (loan)	13	(2)
2019–2020	Torpedo-BelAZ Zhodino	22	(1)
2020	→ Smolevichi (loan)	14	(1)
2020	Neman Grodno	14	(0)
2021	Dinamo Minsk	28	(7)
2022–2023	Ismaily	7	(0)
2022–2023	→ Kryvbas Kryvyi Rih (loan)	0	(0)
2023–2024	Kryvbas Kryvyi Rih	20	(1)
2025	Iraklis	10	(1)
2026–	Irtysh Pavlodar	24	(7)

International career^{‡}
2016–2017	Ivory Coast	2	(0)
- * Club domestic league appearances and goals as of November 1, 2026 ‡ National team caps and goals as of March 26, 2019

Jean Morel Poé (born 15 December 1996) is an Ivorian professional association football player who plays as a right winger for Kazakhstan Premier League club Irtysh Pavlodar.

== Honours ==
=== ASEC Mimosas ===
- Ligue 1 (Ivory Coast): 2018
- Coupe de Côte d'Ivoire: 2018
