= Aleksandr Anufriyev (footballer) =

Belarusian professional footballer

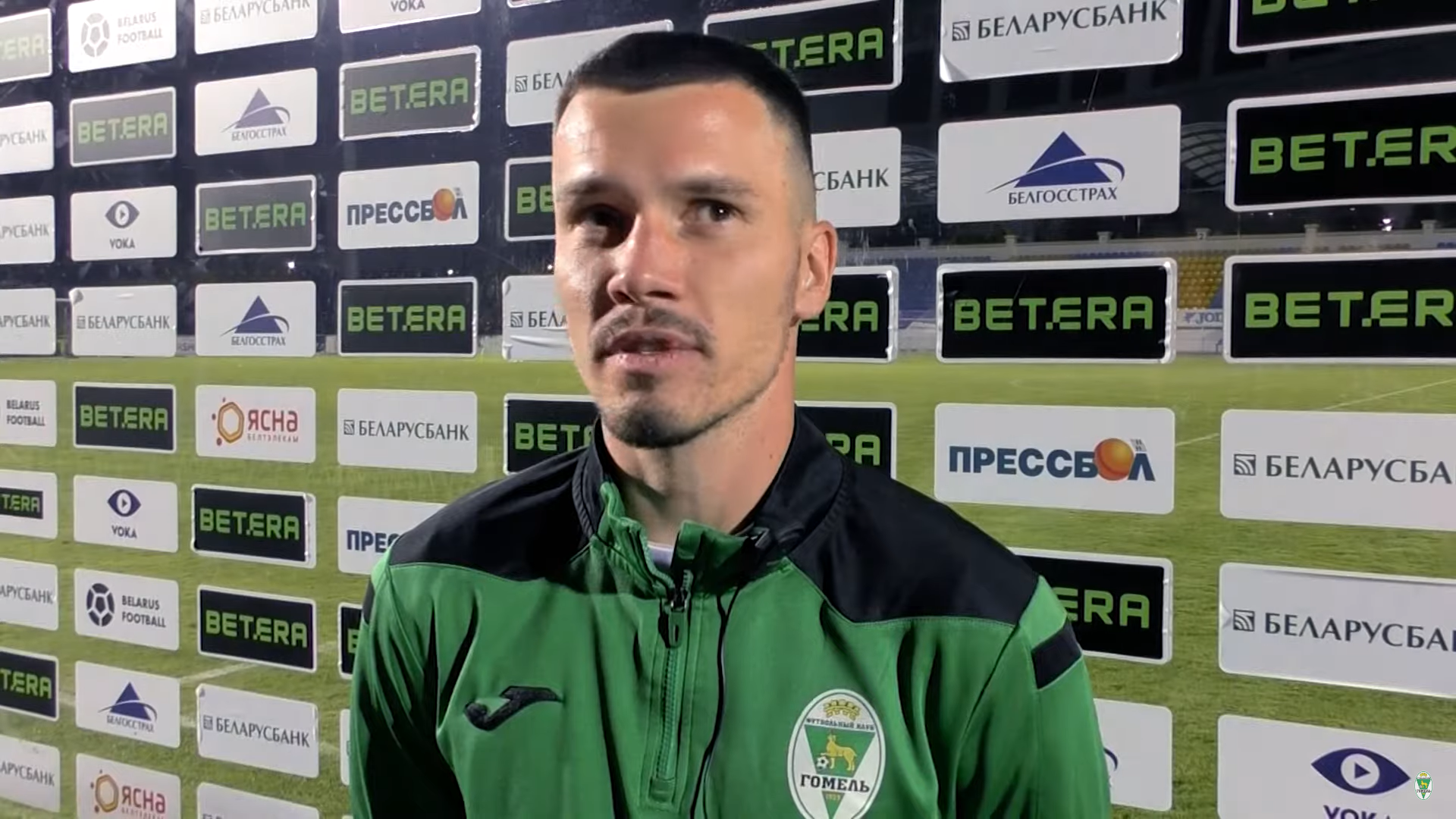

Personal information
- Full name: Aleksandr Sergeyevich Anufriyev
- Date of birth: 21 July 1995 (age 31)
- Place of birth: Novy Dvor, Minsk Raion, Belarus
- Height: 1.80 m (5 ft 11 in)
- Position: Midfielder

Team information
- Current team: Vitebsk
- Number: 8

Youth career
- 2012–2015: BATE Borisov

Senior career*
Years	Team	Apps	(Gls)
2015–2016	BATE Borisov	0	(0)
2015	→ Smorgon (loan)	15	(5)
2016	→ Smolevichi-STI (loan)	23	(9)
2017	Smolevichi-STI	5	(0)
2017	Smorgon	14	(1)
2018–2020	Slavia Mozyr	54	(14)
2020	Minsk	10	(4)
2021	Isloch Minsk Raion	7	(1)
2021	Dinamo Brest	5	(0)
2022–2023	Gomel	50	(13)
2024–2025	BATE Borisov	43	(7)
2025	Slutsk	13	(3)
2026–	Vitebsk	11	(1)
- * Club domestic league appearances and goals as of 3 July 2026

Aleksandr Sergeyevich Anufriyev (Belarusian: Аляксандр Сяргеевіч Ануфрыеў; Russian: Александр Сергеевич Ануфриев; born 21 July 1995) is a Belarusian professional footballer who plays for Vitebsk.

== Honours ==
Gomel

- Belarusian Cup winner: 2021–22
