= Alyaksey Merkulaw =

Belarusian footballer and coach

Personal information
- Full name: Alyaksey Alyaksandravich Merkulaw
- Date of birth: 17 November 1972 (age 53)
- Place of birth: Gomel, Belarusian SSR
- Position: Goalkeeper

Team information
- Current team: Energetik-BGU Minsk (manager)

Senior career*
Years	Team	Apps	(Gls)
1990–1991	Gomselmash Gomel	8	(0)
1992–1994	Polesye Mozyr	77	(0)
1995–2000	Gomel	77	(0)
1999–2000	→ Vedrich-97 Rechitsa (loan)	42	(0)
2001–2005	Vedrich-97 Rechitsa	121	(0)

Managerial career
- 2006–2011: Gomel (assistant)
- 2012: Gomel (reserves)
- 2013–2014: Gomel
- 2014–2018: Gomel (assistant)
- 2018–2019: Gomel
- 2022–2023: Energetik-BGU Minsk (assistant)
- 2023–: Energetik-BGU Minsk
- * Club domestic league appearances and goals

Alyaksey Merkulaw (Belarusian: Аляксей Меркулаў; Russian: Алексей Меркулов; born 17 November 1972) is a Belarusian professional football coach and former player. He was a head coach for Gomel in 2013–2014 again in 2018–2019.
