= Yevgeniy Chernukhin =

Belarusian football coach

Personal information
- Date of birth: 2 March 1984 (age 42)
- Place of birth: Vitebsk, Byelorussian SSR, Soviet Union
- Position: Midfielder

Team information
- Current team: Ufa (analyst)

Youth career
- 2003–2004: Lokomotiv Vitebsk

Senior career*
Years	Team	Apps	(Gls)
2004–2006	Orsha	22	(0)
2008–2012	FC Rudnya		
2014–2015	Priozerye Verkhnedvinsk	23	(0)
2021–2023	Gorodok Lions	20	(1)

Managerial career
- 2014: PMC Postavy (assistant)
- 2015–2017: Vitebsk (reserves assistant)
- 2018: Tosno (assistant)
- 2018–2019: Vitebsk (assistant)
- 2020: BATE Borisov (assistant)
- 2020–2022: Vitebsk
- 2022: Vitebsk (assistant)
- 2023: Pari NN (assistant)
- 2023: Vitebsk (youth)
- 2023–: Ufa (analyst)
- * Club domestic league appearances and goals

Yevgeniy Chernukhin (Belarusian: Яўген Чарнухін; Russian: Евгений Чернухин; born 2 March 1984) is a Belarusian professional football coach and a former player. He works as a coach-analyst with the Russian club Ufa.

In December 2020 he was appointed as a head coach of FC Vitebsk.
