= Nikita Metlitskiy =

Belarusian footballer

Personal information
- Date of birth: 6 February 1995 (age 31)
- Place of birth: Khoiniki, Gomel Oblast, Belarus
- Height: 1.73 m (5 ft 8 in)
- Position: Midfielder

Team information
- Current team: Yuni Minsk
- Number: 15

Youth career
- 2010–2011: RUOR Minsk
- 2012–2013: BATE Borisov
- 2013: Minsk
- 2014: Dinamo Minsk

Senior career*
Years	Team	Apps	(Gls)
2015	Smorgon	12	(0)
2015–2016	Krumkachy Minsk	5	(0)
2016	Granit Mikashevichi	10	(0)
2017–2019	Underdog Chist	74	(27)
2020–2021	Molodechno	34	(14)
2022–2023	Yuni Minsk	28	(5)
- * Club domestic league appearances and goals as of 31 December 2023

Nikita Metlitskiy (Belarusian: Мікіта Мятліцкі; Russian: Никита Метлицкий; born 6 February 1995) is a Belarusian professional footballer who plays for Yuni Minsk.
