= Vladislav Fedotov =

Belarusian professional footballer

Personal information
- Date of birth: 8 February 1997 (age 29)
- Place of birth: Molodechno, Belarus
- Height: 1.73 m (5 ft 8 in)
- Position: Midfielder

Team information
- Current team: Molodechno
- Number: 16

Youth career
- Molodechno-DYuSSh-4

Senior career*
Years	Team	Apps	(Gls)
2015	Molodechno-DYuSSh-4	25	(2)
2016–2018	Isloch Minsk Raion	6	(0)
2018	→ Lida (loan)	9	(1)
2019	Molodechno	6	(0)
2019	Underdog Chist	16	(0)
2020–	Molodechno	67	(0)

International career
2016	Belarus U21	1	(0)
- * Club domestic league appearances and goals as of 31 December 2023

Vladislav Fedotov (Belarusian: Уладзіслаў Фядотаў; Russian: Владислав Федотов; born 8 February 1997) is a Belarusian professional footballer who plays for Molodechno.
