= Maksim Pavlovets =

Belarusian footballer

Personal information
- Date of birth: 8 August 1996 (age 30)
- Place of birth: Pinsk, Brest Oblast, Belarus
- Height: 1.71 m (5 ft 7 1/2 in)
- Position: Midfielder

Team information
- Current team: Krumkachy Minsk

Youth career
- 2012–2013: Volna Pinsk

Senior career*
Years	Team	Apps	(Gls)
2013	Volna Pinsk	3	(0)
2013	Smolevichi-STI	6	(0)
2014–2019	Slavia Mozyr	52	(0)
2018	→ Volna Pinsk (loan)	24	(0)
2020	Granit Mikashevichi	25	(0)
2021	Volna Pinsk	30	(0)
2022–	Krumkachy Minsk	44	(4)

International career
2017	Belarus U21	2	(0)
- * Club domestic league appearances and goals as of 31 December 2023

Maksim Pavlovets (Belarusian: Максім Паўлавец; Russian: Максим Павловец; born 8 August 1996) is a Belarusian footballer who plays for Krumkachy Minsk.
