= Nikita Nikolayevich =

Belarusian footballer

Personal information
- Date of birth: 11 September 1997 (age 29)
- Place of birth: Soligorsk, Minsk Oblast, Belarus
- Height: 1.82 m (5 ft 11 1/2 in)
- Position: Midfielder

Youth career
- 2013–2017: Minsk

Senior career*
Years	Team	Apps	(Gls)
2017–2018	Minsk	32	(2)
2019–2021	Torpedo-BelAZ Zhodino	73	(6)
2022	Slavia Sofia	5	(0)
2022	Dugopolje	8	(0)
2023	Shakhtyor Soligorsk	14	(1)

International career
2013	Belarus U17	2	(0)
2017	Belarus U21	1	(0)
- * Club domestic league appearances and goals as of 31 December 2023

Nikita Nikolayevich (Belarusian: Мікіта Нікалаевіч; Russian: Никита Николаевич; born 11 September 1997) is a Belarusian professional footballer who plays as a midfielder.
