= Saviour Nwafor =

Nigerian footballer

Personal information
- Full name: Saviour Nwafor Chukwuemeka
- Date of birth: 10 January 2002 (age 24)
- Place of birth: Enugu, Nigeria
- Position: Midfielder

Team information
- Current team: Gudja United
- Number: 27

Youth career
- Prince Kazeem FA

Senior career*
Years	Team	Apps	(Gls)
2020	Rukh Brest	6	(0)
2021	Minsk	0	(0)
2023	Mosta	2	(0)
2024–	Gudja United	7	(0)
- * Club domestic league appearances and goals as of 13 May 2024

Saviour Nwafor (born 10 January 2002) is a Nigerian professional footballer who plays for Gudja United.
