= Dušan Bakić =

Montenegrin footballer (born 1999)

Personal information
- Date of birth: 23 February 1999 (age 27)
- Place of birth: Podgorica, FR Yugoslavia
- Height: 1.90 m (6 ft 3 in)
- Position: Forward

Team information
- Current team: Dynamo Brest
- Number: 7

Youth career
- –2017: Budućnost Podgorica

Senior career*
Years	Team	Apps	(Gls)
2018–2019	Budućnost Podgorica	35	(2)
2020	Energetik-BGU Minsk	24	(8)
2021–2023	Dinamo Minsk	52	(17)
2021	→ Legion Tallinn (loan)	13	(3)
2024–2025	Omonia	11	(0)
2024–2025	→ Karmiotissa (loan)	7	(1)
2025	Dinamo Minsk	12	(1)
2025	Torpedo Moscow	9	(0)
2026–	Dynamo Brest	11	(2)

International career^{‡}
2018	Montenegro U-19	2	(0)
2018–2020	Montenegro U-21	5	(0)
2022–2024	Montenegro	9	(0)
- * Club domestic league appearances and goals as of 6 July 2026 ‡ National team caps and goals as of 8 June 2024

Dušan Bakić (born 23 February 1999) is a Montenegrin professional footballer who plays as a forward for Dynamo Brest.

== International career ==
Bakić made his senior international debut for Montenegro on 17 November 2022 at Podgorica City Stadium in a 2–2 draw against Slovakia. He came on as a substitute for Marko Vešović, who had been booked with a yellow card after 57 minutes. Three days later, he earned his second cap in a 0–1 away defeat against Slovenia.
