= FC Meliorator Zhitkovichi =

- Full name: Football Club Meliorator Zhitkovichi
- Founded: 2020
- Ground: City Stadium, Zhitkovichi
- Capacity: 1,000
- League: Belarusian Second League
- 2020: 12th

FC Meliorator Zhitkovichi is a Belarusian football club based in Zhitkovichi, Gomel Oblast. The team played in the Belarusian Second League.

== History ==
The club was founded in 2020 and joined the Belarusian Second League the same year.
