= FC SKA-1938 Minsk =

SKA-1938
- Full name: Football Club SKA-1938
- Nickname: The Students
- Founded: 1996; 30 years ago
- Ground: RCOR-BGU Stadium, Minsk
- Capacity: 1,500
- Manager: Alyaksey Merkulaw
- League: Belarusian First League
- 2025: Belarusian Second League, 1st (promoted)
Home colours	Away colours

FC SKA-1938 Minsk (also Belarusian: ФК СКА-1938) is a Belarusian professional football club based in Minsk.

== History ==
The team was founded in 1996 as Zvezda Minsk (Zorka Minsk). BGU is a Russian abbreviation and stands for the Belarusian State University.

Zvezda-VA-BGU (Zorka-VA-BDU) made its debut in Premier League in 2002 and played there until 2005. Since 2006, the team plays in lower leagues.

In 2006, Zvezda-BGU reached the semi-final of the Belarusian Cup.

In 2010, the women's team of (then-) Zorka-BDU Minsk reached the Round of 32 of the Women's Champions League.

=== Name changes ===
- 1996: founded as Zvezda Minsk (Zorka Minsk, Belarusian: Зорка Мінск)
- 1998: renamed to Zvezda-VA-BGU Minsk (VA stands for Vayennaya Akademiya or Voyennaya Akademiya, Belarusian/Russian for Military Academy)
- 2005: renamed to Zvezda-BGU Minsk
- 2017: renamed to Energetik-BGU Minsk (Enerhyetyk-BDU Minsk)
- 2026: renamed to SKA-1938 Minsk

== Current squad ==
As of 1 September 2026

Note: Flags indicate national team as defined under FIFA eligibility rules; some limited exceptions apply. Players may hold more than one non-FIFA nationality.

No.	Pos.	Nation	Player
1	GK	BLR	Denis Seledtsov
2	DF	BLR	Artem Sakovich
3	DF	BLR	Fedor Fedorovich
4	DF	BLR	Denis Royko
5	MF	RUS	Arseny Medvedev
6	MF	BLR	Vyacheslav Prigodich
7	MF	BLR	Matvey Nikiforenko
8	MF	BLR	Yegor Lukashenko
9	MF	BLR	Miron Korytko
10	FW	BLR	Danila Chul
11	FW	BLR	Aleksandr Zhlobich
13	GK	BLR	Vadim Kazlovskiy
14	DF	BLR	Ilya Kazakow
16	DF	UZB	Abdulloh Yunusov
17	FW	RUS	Ali Kartoyev
18	MF	BLR	Fyodor Yegiptsev
20	FW	BLR	Artyom Kholyusev

No.	Pos.	Nation	Player
21	DF	BLR	Aleksey Konyakhin
22	MF	BLR	Aleksandr Guz
23	DF	BLR	Maksim Yaskevich
26	DF	BLR	Timofey Kontsevoy
27	MF	BLR	Roman Silkin
77	MF	BLR	Kirill Parmonov
80	MF	RUS	Nikita Knyshev
98	MF	RUS	Aleksey Slivin
—	MF	BLR	Timofey Bobovik
—	MF	BLR	Timur Isayev
—	GK	BLR	Vladislav Matskevich
—	GK	BLR	Mikhail Kravchuk
—	DF	BLR	Artyom Kulaga
—	DF	RUS	Aleksandr Mazko
—	MF	BLR	Yaroslav Shaban
—	MF	BLR	Nikita Solonovich

== Domestic history ==
Season	League									Belarusian Cup	Top goalscorer		Notes
Season	Div.	Pos.	Pl.	W	D	L	GS	GA	P	Belarusian Cup	Name	League	Notes
1996	3rd	3rd	26	17	4	5	63	24	55				
1997	3rd	4th	26	14	5	7	56	38	47				
1998	3rd	1st	26	18	2	6	67	27	56				Promoted
1999	2nd	12th	30	8	9	13	38	57	33	Round of 16			
2000	2nd	4th	30	15	7	8	47	35	52				
2001	2nd	2nd	30	19	5	4	74	21	62	Round of 32	(Belarus) Maksim Sukhoveyev	28	Promoted
2002	1st	12th	26	4	6	16	28	48	18	Round of 32			
2003	1st	12th	30	7	4	19	23	64	25	Round of 16			
2004	1st	13th	30	7	8	15	31	56	29	Round of 16			
2005	1st	13th	26	3	5	18	24	60	14	Round of 32			Relegated
2006	2nd	12th	26	5	10	11	32	39	25	Semi Final			
2007	2nd	14th	26	2	4	20	17	58	10	Round of 32			Relegated
2008	3rd	4th	30	15	8	7	59	28	53	Round of 32			
2009	3rd	7th	26	11	6	9	40	34	39	Round of 32			
2010	3rd	5th	34	15	10	9	76	47	55	Round of 32			
2011	3rd	8th	30	12	6	12	40	32	42	Round of 32			
2012	3rd	7th	36	18	4	14	54	41	58	Round of 32			
2013	3rd	3rd	24	14	7	3	45	16	49	Round of 32			Promoted
2014	2nd	9th	30	12	4	14	50	48	40	Second round			
2015	2nd	10th	30	10	10	10	47	47	40	Round of 16			
2016	2nd	10th	26	9	6	11	33	41	33	Second Round			
2017	2nd	6th	30	12	8	10	39	30	44	Round of 32			
2018	2nd	2nd	28	21	4	3	69	23	67	Second Round	(Belarus) Vsevolod Sadovsky	21	Promoted
2019	1st	12th	30	8	9	13	52	66	33	Round of 32	(Belarus) Ilya Shkurin	19	
2020	1st	10th	30	11	5	14	43	46	38	Round of 16	(Uzbekistan) Jasurbek Yakhshiboev	9	
2021	1st	13th	30	8	9	13	35	42	33	Round of 16	(Kazakhstan) Vladislav Vasilyev	5	
2022	1st	2nd	30	18	6	6	50	27	60	Round of 16	(Uzbekistan) Bobur Abdikholikov	26	
2023	1st	14	28	7	6	15	25	42	4	Round of 16			
2024	2nd	14	28	7	8	19	36	55	19	Round of 32			
2025	3rd									Round of 32			
