= Valeriy Senko =

Belarusian footballer

Personal information
- Date of birth: 7 April 1998 (age 28)
- Place of birth: Baranovichi, Belarus
- Height: 1.76 m (5 ft 9 in)
- Position: Midfielder

Team information
- Current team: Slavia Mozyr
- Number: 9

Youth career
- 2014–2017: Shakhtyor Soligorsk

Senior career*
Years	Team	Apps	(Gls)
2017–2018	Shakhtyor Soligorsk	0	(0)
2018	→ Luch Minsk (loan)	8	(0)
2019–2020	Slavia Mozyr	8	(0)
2020–2022	Arsenal Dzerzhinsk	72	(9)
2023–2024	Isloch Minsk Raion	47	(4)
2025	Arsenal Dzerzhinsk	23	(1)
2026–	Slavia Mozyr	3	(0)

International career^{‡}
2019	Belarus U21	1	(0)
- * Club domestic league appearances and goals as of 6 July 2026 ‡ National team caps and goals as of 16 March 2019

Valeriy Senko (Belarusian: Валерый Сянько; Russian: Валерий Сенько; born 7 April 1998) is a Belarusian professional footballer who plays for Slavia Mozyr.
