= FC PMC Postavy =

PMC Postavy
- Full name: Football club PMC Postavy
- Founded: 2006
- Dissolved: 2014
- Ground: FOK Stadium, Postavy
- League: Belarusian First League
- 2008: 14th (Relegated)

FC PMC Pastavy was a football club based in Postavy, Vitebsk Oblast.

== History ==
The club was founded in 2006 as a farm club of MTZ-RIPO Minsk and an outfit for local players. PMC Postavy played two seasons in Belarusian Second League, after which they were promoted to the First League. The First League debut was unsuccessful, as the club finished on the last (14th) place and got relegated. At the end of the season the partnership with MTZ ended and the senior team of PMC was disbanded.

Since 2009 PMC Postavy focused on developing youth players and became a football academy. In November 2014 academy was closed due to financial troubles.
