= FC Zhlobin =

Zhlobin
- Full name: FC Zhlobin
- Founded: 1994 / 2003
- Dissolved: 1996
- Ground: Lokomotiv Stadium, Zhlobin
- Capacity: 2,400
- Manager: Vladimir Blagodarov
- League: Belarusian Second League
- 2020: 22nd

FC Zhlobin is a Belarusian football club based in Zhlobin, Gomel Oblast.

== History ==
The team was founded in 1994 as Energiya Zhlobin. They played in Belarusian Second League for three seasons, and at the end of 1996 the club was folded.

In 2003 the club was reformed as Kommunalnik Zhlobin. In the same year they joined Belarusian Second League, where they have been playing ever since.

Kommunalnik showed some good results in their first five seasons. They were close to promotion in 2006 and 2007, but finished 4th both times. They also qualified for eighthfinals of 2007–08 Belarusian Cup. However, in early 2008 the financial problems struck the team. They withdrew from the cup and changed their name to the current FC Zhlobin. Their league results declined as they never finished above 10th place until 2013. After 2015 season the club withdrew from the Second League and currently participates in youth and regional competitions.

In 2020 the club rejoined Second League.

=== Name changes ===
- 1994: formed as Energiya Zhlobin
- 2003: reformed as Kommunalnik Zhlobin
- 2008: renamed to Zhlobin

== Current squad ==
As of October 2023

Note: Flags indicate national team as defined under FIFA eligibility rules; some limited exceptions apply. Players may hold more than one non-FIFA nationality.

No.	Pos.	Nation	Player
—	GK	BLR	Andrey Andreychikov
—	GK	BLR	Konstantin Vorozhun
—	GK	BLR	Artem Gavrilenko
—	DF	BLR	Andrey Blashkevich
—	DF	BLR	Dmitriy Gutiy
—	DF	BLR	David Kovalev
—	DF	BLR	Ivan Kovalev
—	DF	BLR	Danila Konovalchik
—	DF	BLR	Oleg Lyashenko
—	DF	BLR	Artem Mikhaltsov
—	DF	BLR	Dmitriy Stroyev
—	DF	BLR	Kirill Tolkachev
—	MF	BLR	Ilya Demesh
—	MF	BLR	Renat Derevyashkin
—	MF	BLR	Ihar Zhukaw
—	MF	BLR	Oleg Zubko

No.	Pos.	Nation	Player
—	MF	BLR	Aleksandr Klyuchnikov
—	MF	BLR	Dzyanis Kazlow
—	MF	BLR	Kirill Kokoshenko
—	MF	BLR	Andrey Kolesnev
—	MF	BLR	Vladimir Kopeykin
—	MF	BLR	Sergey Kryshnev
—	MF	BLR	Aleh Lebedzew
—	MF	BLR	Vladislav Mozhayev
—	MF	BLR	Pavel Rodionov
—	MF	BLR	Aleksey Savko
—	MF	BLR	Roman Sasnovskiy
—	MF	BLR	Stanislav Chernysh
—	FW	BLR	Pavel Dobrovolsky
—	FW	BLR	Nikolay Kolesnev
—	FW	BLR	Ivan Popkov
—	FW	BLR	Anton Tkachow
