= Pavel Klenyo =

Belarusian footballer

Personal information
- Date of birth: 28 April 1999 (age 27)
- Place of birth: Minsk, Belarus
- Height: 1.80 m (5 ft 11 in)
- Position: Midfielder

Team information
- Current team: Molodechno
- Number: 20

Youth career
- 2013–2017: Minsk

Senior career*
Years	Team	Apps	(Gls)
2017	Neman-Agro Stolbtsy	15	(1)
2018–2019	Torpedo Minsk	29	(3)
2019	Gomel	0	(0)
2020	Lokomotiv Gomel	21	(10)
2021	Torpedo-BelAZ Zhodino	11	(3)
2022	Minsk	8	(0)
2022–2024	Maxline Vitebsk	43	(5)
2024	Orsha	4	(1)
2025–2026	Unixlabs Minsk	36	(4)
2026–	Molodechno	4	(0)

International career
2019	Belarus U21	1	(3)
- * Club domestic league appearances and goals as of 15 August 2026

Pavel Klenyo (Belarusian: Павел Кляннё; Russian: Павел Кленьё; born 28 April 1999) is a Belarusian professional footballer who plays for Molodechno.
