= Stanislaw Drahun =

Belarusian footballer

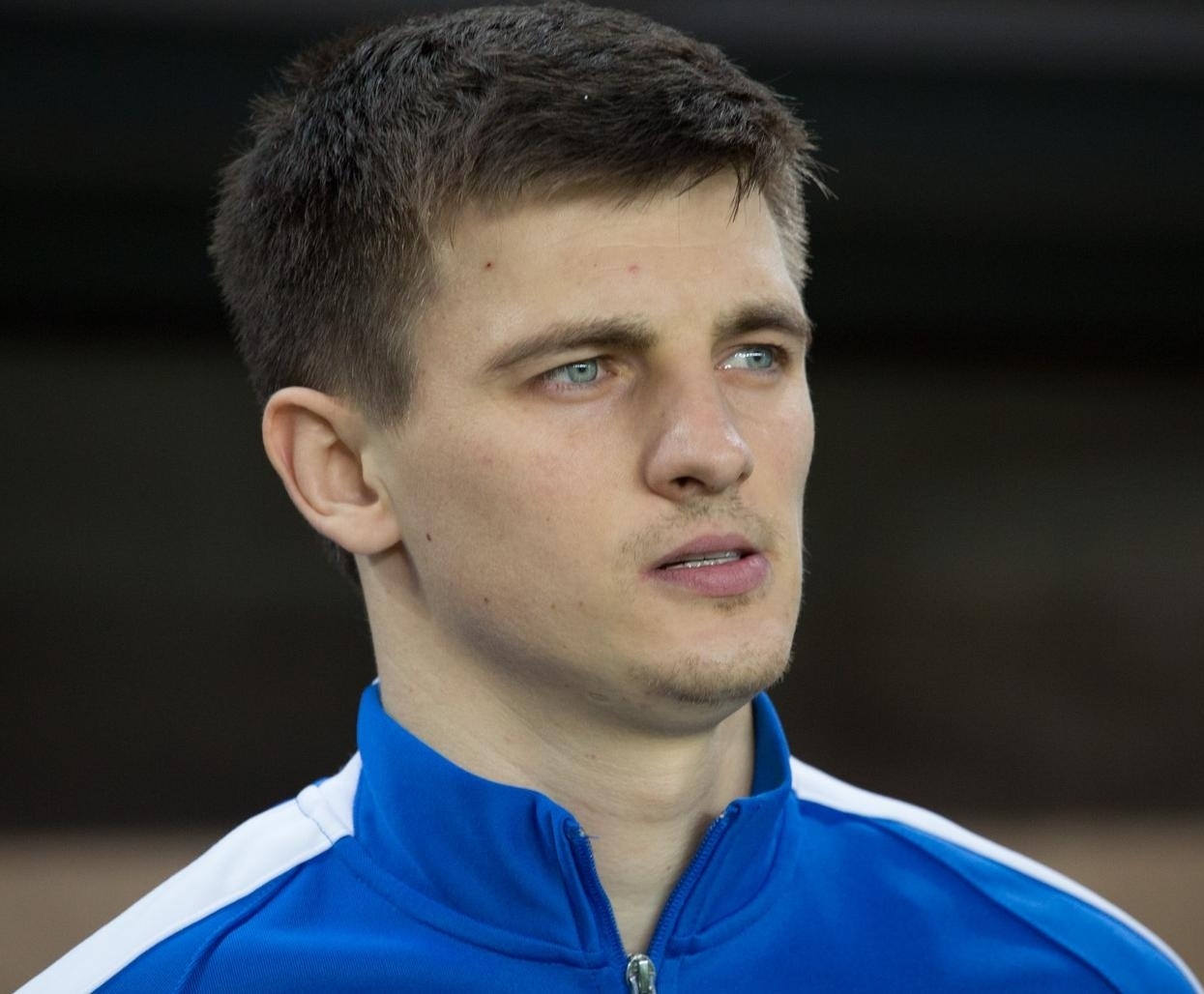
- Drahun with Dynamo Moscow in 2016

Personal information
- Date of birth: 4 June 1988 (age 38)
- Place of birth: Minsk, Belarusian SSR, Soviet Union
- Height: 1.81 m (5 ft 11 1/2 in)
- Position: Midfielder

Senior career*
Years	Team	Apps	(Gls)
2004–2006	Lokomotiv Minsk	39	(2)
2007–2008	Gomel	39	(4)
2008–2012	Dinamo Minsk	128	(25)
2013–2015	Krylia Sovetov Samara	77	(6)
2016	Dynamo Moscow	21	(0)
2017	Orenburg	11	(0)
2017–2023	BATE Borisov	136	(42)
Total		451	(79)

International career
2004–2005	Belarus U17	3	(0)
2005–2007	Belarus U19	8	(3)
2008–2011	Belarus U21	25	(5)
2011–2012	Belarus Olympic	8	(1)
2011–2020	Belarus	68	(11)
- * Club domestic league appearances and goals

Stanislaw Eduardavich Drahun (Belarusian: Станіслаў Эдуардавіч Драгун; Russian: Станислав Эдуардович Драгун; born 4 June 1988) is a Belarusian former professional footballer who played as a midfielder for the Belarus national team and the national youth teams.

== Career ==
Drahun was a member of the Belarus U21 that finished in 3rd place at the 2011 UEFA European Under-21 Championship. He played in all five of the matches and earned a penalty for his team (which was converted by Andrei Voronkov) in the 2:0 group stage win against Iceland U21. On 10 August 2011, Drahun made his senior side debut in the 1:0 win against Bulgaria in an exhibition match. He also played for the Belarus Olympic team that participated in the 2012 Toulon Tournament, appearing in all three of their matches and scoring one goal (versus France Olympic team), while also receiving a red card in the game against Mexico Olympic team. He competed at the 2012 Summer Olympics as one of Belarus's 3 allowed over-23 players. On 14 February 2019, Drahun scored the winning goal in the first leg of a UEFA Europa League knockout round tie with Arsenal that finished 1–0.

== Career statistics ==
=== International ===
Scores and results list Belarus' goal tally first.

#	Date	Venue	Opponent	Score	Result	Competition
1.	7 October 2011	Arena Națională, Bucharest, Romania	Romania	2–2	2–2	UEFA Euro 2012 qualification
2.	7 June 2012	Dinamo Stadium, Minsk, Belarus	Lithuania	1–1	1–1	Friendly
3.	16 October 2012	Dinamo Stadium, Minsk, Belarus	Georgia	2–0	2–0	2014 FIFA World Cup qualification
4.	8 September 2014	Stade Josy Barthel, Luxembourg, Luxembourg	Luxembourg	1–1	1–1	UEFA Euro 2016 qualification
5.	9 October 2015	Štadión pod Dubňom, Žilina, Slovakia	Slovakia	1–0	1–0	UEFA Euro 2016 qualification
6.	8 September 2018	Dinamo Stadium, Minsk, Belarus	San Marino	2–0	5–0	2018–19 UEFA Nations League D
7.	8 September 2018	Dinamo Stadium, Minsk, Belarus	San Marino	4–0	5–0	2018–19 UEFA Nations League D
8.	15 November 2018	Stade Josy Barthel, Luxembourg, Luxembourg	Luxembourg	1–0	2–0	2018–19 UEFA Nations League D
9.	15 November 2018	Stade Josy Barthel, Luxembourg, Luxembourg	Luxembourg	2–0	2–0	2018–19 UEFA Nations League D
10.	18 November 2018	San Marino Stadium, Serravalle, San Marino	San Marino	1–0	2–0	2018–19 UEFA Nations League D
11.	13 October 2019	Dinamo Stadium, Minsk, Belarus	Netherlands	1–2	1–2	UEFA Euro 2020 qualification

== Honours ==
BATE Borisov

- Belarusian Premier League: 2017, 2018
- Belarusian Cup: 2019–20, 2020–21
- Belarusian Super Cup winner: 2022

Belarus U21

- UEFA European Under-21 Championship bronze: 2011
