= FC Oshmyany =

Oshmyany
- Full name: FC Oshmyany
- Founded: 2012 (Slavyanin Minsk); 2015 (FC Oshmyany)
- Dissolved: 2021
- Ground: FOK Stadium, Oshmyany
- Capacity: 500
- League: Belarusian First League
- 2020: 10th
Home colours	Away colours

FC Oshmyany was a Belarusian football club based in Ashmyany (Oshmyany), Grodno Oblast.

== History ==
The club was founded in 2012 as Slavyanin Minsk and was originally based in Minsk. Slavyanin participated in Minsk-based amateur leagues in 2012–2013 and joined Belarusian Second League in 2014. In spring 2015, it was decided by team management to relocate the club to the town of Oshmyany and rename it accordingly (FC Oshmyany).

In 2016, FC Oshmyany, who finished 5th in last year's Second League season, were promoted to the Belarusian First League as a replacement for a few withdrawn clubs.
