= Denis Scherbakov =

Belarusian professional football referee (born 1978)

Denis Scherbakov (Russian: Денис Щербаков, Belarusian: Дзяніс Шчарбакоў; born 7 August 1978, in Minsk) is a Belarusian professional football referee. He has officiated matches of the Belarusian Premier League since 2010.

Scherbakov became a FIFA referee in 2010. He started as a fourth official behind Aleksei Kulbakov and began refereeing international matches on his own since 2012.
