= FC Svetlogorsk =

FC Khimik
- Full name: Football Club Khimik
- Founded: 1971 (FC Khimik); 2021 (FC Svertlogorsk)
- Ground: Bumazhnik Stadium
- Capacity: 2,500
- Head Coach: Igor Mukha
- League: Belarusian Second League
- 2020: Belarusian First League, 14th (withdrew)
Home colours	Away colours

FC Svetlogorsk is a Belarusian football club based in Svietlahorsk, Gomel Region.

== History ==
Khimik Svetlogorsk (also previously known as Bumazhnik Svetlogorsk (1971–1972, 1986–1987), Stroitel Svetlogorsk (1973), Burovik Svetlogorsk (1974–1975) and Kommunalnik Svetlogorsk (1997–2000)) is known for being the only club in Belarus that had been playing the Belarusian First League since the first season (1992) without a single promotion or relegation for 30 consecutive seasons. The series ended after 2020 season, when the club was disbanded due to financial troubles.

In 2021, a successor team FC Svetlogorsk was established in the Belarusian Second League.

== Current squad ==
As of October 2023

Note: Flags indicate national team as defined under FIFA eligibility rules; some limited exceptions apply. Players may hold more than one non-FIFA nationality.

No.	Pos.	Nation	Player
—	GK	(Belarus) BLR	Vladislav Bobruyko
—	GK	(Belarus) BLR	Renat Ignatenko
—	GK	(Belarus) BLR	Ilya Pukhalskiy
—	DF	(Belarus) BLR	Ilya Akhremchuk
—	DF	(Belarus) BLR	Stanislav Bakeyev
—	DF	(Belarus) BLR	Alyaksandr Bely
—	DF	(Belarus) BLR	Alyaksandr Busel
—	DF	(Belarus) BLR	Ilya Golub
—	DF	(Belarus) BLR	Maksim Dashkovskiy
—	DF	(Belarus) BLR	Vladimir Yenich
—	DF	(Belarus) BLR	Ilya Zaytsev
—	DF	(Belarus) BLR	Ruslan Zaytsev
—	DF	(Belarus) BLR	Vladislav Zgurskiy
—	DF	(Belarus) BLR	Yawhen Kazlow
—	DF	(Belarus) BLR	Aleksandr Kukar
—	DF	(Belarus) BLR	Daniil Moyseyenko
—	DF	(Belarus) BLR	Igor Mukha
—	DF	(Belarus) BLR	Dmitriy Nosyrev
—	DF	(Belarus) BLR	Raman Sawchanka
—	DF	(Belarus) BLR	Dmitriy Skakun
—	DF	(Belarus) BLR	Aleksey Scherbin

No.	Pos.	Nation	Player
—	DF	(Belarus) BLR	Sergey Scherbin
—	MF	(Belarus) BLR	Nikita Brokar
—	MF	(Belarus) BLR	Nikolay Gubko
—	MF	(Belarus) BLR	Daniil Deykun
—	MF	(Belarus) BLR	Yuliy Dyachenko
—	MF	(Belarus) BLR	Valeriy Zhuravskiy
—	MF	(Belarus) BLR	Andrey Kurskiy
—	MF	(Belarus) BLR	Daniil Lebedzew
—	MF	(Belarus) BLR	Nikita Lebedenko
—	MF	(Belarus) BLR	Sergey Lukashenko
—	MF	(Belarus) BLR	Aleksandr Mayseyenko
—	MF	(Belarus) BLR	Pavel Matveyev
—	MF	(Belarus) BLR	Dmitriy Silivonchik
—	MF	(Belarus) BLR	Petr Tishkevich
—	MF	(Belarus) BLR	Yevgeniy Tsygankov
—	FW	(Belarus) BLR	Alyaksandr Bely
—	FW	(Belarus) BLR	Kirill Pischalo
—	FW	(Belarus) BLR	Aleksey Pugach
—	FW	(Belarus) BLR	Dmitriy Semzhenos
—	FW	(Belarus) BLR	Ilya Turovskiy
