= Belarusian Second League =

- Founded: 1992; 34 years ago
- Country: Belarus
- Confederation: UEFA
- Number of clubs: 84
- Level on pyramid: 3
- Promotion to: Belarusian First League
- Domestic cup: Belarusian Cup
- Current champions: Energetik-BGU Minsk (2025)
- Website: abff.by
- Current: 2026 Belarusian Second League

The Belarusian Second League (Belarusian: Другая ліга чэмпіянату Беларусі па футболе, romanized: Druhaya liha chempiyanatu Byelarusi pa futbole) is the third tier of professional football in Belarus. It was established in 1992.

== History and format ==
A strict number of teams and competition format are not defined for the league. Before the start of each season the format of the league is adjusted depending on how many teams are willing to participate and able to fulfill licensing criteria. A number of best teams (typically two, but not always) are getting promoted to Belarusian First League.

- During 1992–1994, 2001–2002, 2004–2013 and since 2016 the League format was a simple double round-robin tournament (except for shortened 1992 season, which was a single round-robin tournament). The number of participating clubs varied between 13 and 20.
- 2003 season marked the lowest number of participants in League's history (12).
- During 1994–1999 the participants were split into two groups on a geographical basis. The number of participating clubs varied between 24 and 40.
- In 2000 and during 2014–2015 the participants were split into two groups on a geographical basis. The number of participating clubs varied between 20 and 24.

== Second League in 2019 ==
=== Format ===
16 clubs will play twice (home and away) with each opponent for the total of 30 games. Two best teams will be promoted to Belarusian First League for 2019.

Team	Location	Position in 2018
UAS	Zhitkovichi	First League, 10
Underdog Chist	Chist	First League, 15
Oshmyany	Oshmyany	4
Uzda	Uzda	5
Osipovichi	Osipovichi	6
Ivatsevichi	Ivatsevichi	7
Viktoriya	Maryina Gorka	8
Molodechno	Molodechno	9
SMIautotrans	Smolevichi	10
Neman-Agro	Stolbtsy	11
Kletsk	Kletsk	12
Energetik-BGATU	Minsk	13
Gorki	Gorki	14
Belshina-2	Bobruisk	n/a
Arsenal	Dzerzhinsk	n/a
DYuSSh-3-Stanles	Pinsk	n/a

== Winners and promoted teams ==
Season	Champions	Also promoted
1992	Smena Minsk	Albertin Slonim, ZLiN Gomel
1992–93	Brestbytkhim Brest	
1993–94	Kardan-Flyers Grodno	Ataka-Aura Minsk
1994–95	Fomalgaut Borisov (Group A), Naftan-Devon Novopolotsk (Group B)	Dinamo-Juni Minsk
1995	MPKC-2 Minsk ^{1} (Group A), Maxim-Orsha (Group B)	Stroitel Bereza
1996	BATE Borisov (Group A), Veino Mogilev Raion (Group B)	Beloozyorsk, Dnepr Rogachev
1997	Dinamo-Energo Vitebsk (Group A), Svisloch-Krovlya Osipovichi (Group B)	Polesye Kozenki, ZLiN Gomel
1998	Zvezda-VA-BGU Minsk (Group A), Granit Mikashevichi (Group B)	Neman Mosty
1999	Traktor Minsk (Group A), Luninets (Group B)	
2000	Darida Minsk Raion	
2001	Lokomotiv Minsk	Smorgon
2002	MTZ-RIPO Minsk	Pinsk-900, Vertikal Kalinkovichi
2003	Baranovichi	Veras Nesvizh
2004	Smena Minsk	Orsha
2005	Torpedo-SKA Minsk ^{2}	Pinsk-900, Polotsk
2006	Dinamo-Belcard Grodno	Savit Mogilev
2007	PMC Postavy	Lida, Spartak Shklov
2008	DSK Gomel	
2009	Rudensk	
2010	Gorodeya	Slutsksakhar Slutsk, Klechesk Kletsk
2011	Lida	Bereza-2010
2012	Smolevichi-STI	Beltransgaz Slonim, Isloch Minsk Raion, Minsk-2
2013	Gomelzheldortrans	Zvezda-BGU Minsk
2014	Baranovichi	Krumkachy Minsk, Orsha, Kobrin
2015	Luch Minsk	Torpedo Minsk, Oshmyany
2016	Volna Pinsk	Osipovichi, Neman-Agro Stolbtsy
2017	UAS Zhitkovichi	Chist
2018	Rukh Brest	Krumkachy Minsk, Sputnik Rechitsa
2019	Arsenal Dzerzhinsk	Oshmyany, Molodechno
2020	Dnepr Mogilev	Shakhtyor, Baranovichi
2021	Ostrovets	Rogachev, Osipovichi, Molodechno
2022	Niva Dolbizno	Bumprom Gomel, Zhodino Yuzhnoye
2023	Partizan Soligorsk	Krumkachy, Rukh
2024	FC Minsk-2	Unixlabs Minsk, Gomel-2, Osipovichi
2025	Energetik-BGU Minsk	Torpedo-BelAZ-2 Zhodino

- ^{1} Not promoted; ineligible as a farm club.
- ^{2} Initially promoted, but dissolved before the start of the next season.
