= FC Krumkachy Minsk =

Krumkachy Minsk
- Full name: Football Club NFK Minsk
- Nickname: Ravens
- Founded: 2011; 15 years ago
- Ground: SOK Alimpijski, Minsk
- Capacity: 1,500
- Chairman: Oleg Davidovich
- Head Coach: Syarhey Kazeka
- League: Belarusian Second League
- 2022: 2nd
- Website: krumkachy.com
Home colours	Away colours

NFC Krumkachy Minsk (Belarusian: HФК Крумкачы Мінск, Russian: НФК Крумкачы) is a Belarusian professional football club based in the capital city of Minsk.

== History ==
The club was founded in 2011 by a group of football fans. The club was named after the Belarusian word for ravens. After competing in the Belarusian amateur leagues for a few seasons, they joined the Belarusian Second League, the third division of Belarusian football, in 2014. With the help of some experienced players, the team was able to finish 2nd in their debut season in the third tier and was promoted to the Belarusian First League for the 2015 season. At the end of the 2015 season, Krumkachy successfully completed back-to-back promotions and were promoted to the Belarusian Premier League for the first time in their history after a 2–0 win against Dnepr Mogilev.

Their first ever season in the Belarusian top flight was successful as they finished in 11th place. They followed this up with a good second season, again finishing in mid-table in 13th place. In early 2018, however, Krumkachy were excluded from the Premier League and demoted to the Second League due to persistent financial issues and payment delays as well as licensing issues. The club was restarted as a new legal entity. They finished 2nd in the 2018 Second League season and were again promoted to the First League.

In early 2019, the club changed its name to NFK Minsk to avoid BFF membership clash with the old Krumkachy legal entity. In 2020, the naming issue was resolved, and the club's name was reverted to the original Krumkachy Minsk.

== Current squad ==
As of March 2025

Note: Flags indicate national team as defined under FIFA eligibility rules; some limited exceptions apply. Players may hold more than one non-FIFA nationality.

No.	Pos.	Nation	Player
—	GK	BLR	Vladimir Bushma
—	DF	BLR	Daniil Volkov
—	DF	BLR	Ilya Sugakov
—	DF	BLR	Stanislav Khodanovich
—	DF	BLR	Vladislav Khomutovskiy
—	MF	BLR	Sergey Yakimtsov
—	MF	BLR	Dmitry Vashkel
—	MF	BLR	Yevgeniy Gordeychik
—	MF	BLR	Daniil Dubrovskiy
—	MF	BLR	Ilya Zaytsev
—	MF	BLR	Syarhey Kazeka
—	MF	BLR	Marat Kozyrev

No.	Pos.	Nation	Player
—	MF	BLR	Konstantin Kuimov
—	MF	BLR	Maksim Pavlovets
—	MF	BLR	Vadim Prokopenko
—	MF	BLR	Arseniy Starikov
—	MF	BLR	Nikita Yukhnovich
—	FW	BLR	Yegor Antonovich
—	FW	BLR	Ivan Kalenskiy
—	FW	BLR	Ilya Kuralenko
—	FW	BLR	Yanush Ladutko
—	FW	BLR	Sergey Lipnitskiy
—	FW	BLR	Sergey Lynko
—	FW	BLR	Pavel Schuka
