= FC Sputnik Rechitsa =

Belarusian football club

Sputnik Rechitsa
- Full name: Football Club Sputnik Rechitsa
- Founded: 2017
- Dissolved: 2021
- Ground: Central Stadium, Rechitsa
- Capacity: 3,550
- League: Belarusian Premier League
- 2021: 16th (withdrew)
Home colours	Away colours

FC Sputnik Rechitsa was a Belarusian football club based in Rechytsa.

The club was founded in 2017 after a relocation of FC DYuSSh-DSK Gomel to Rechytsa. The club finished third in the 2018 Belarusian Second League season and in early 2019, they were offered a promotion to the First League, after a vacancy opened. Sputnik took the offer and made its First League debut in 2019.

On July 14, 2021, it became known that the club was dissolved after not being able to carry on being funded, resulting in withdrawal from the league and 3-0 wins being given to opponents for the rest of the season.
