= FC Smolevichi =

Smolevichi
- Full name: Football Club Smolevichi
- Founded: 2009; 17 years ago
- Dissolved: 2021
- Ground: Ozyorny Stadium, Smolevichi
- Capacity: 1,600
- League: Belarusian Second League
- 2021: 12th (Minsk Oblast)
- Website: https://www.fcsmolevichi.by
Home colours	Away colours

FC Smolevichi (Belarusian: ФК Смалявічы, Russian: ФК Смолевичи), was a Belarusian football club based in Smalyavichy (Smolevichi), Minsk Oblast.

== History ==
The team was founded in 2009 as Vigvam Smolevichi. The same year, they debuted in the Minsk Oblast championship. In 2010, they joined the Belarusian Second League. They were renamed to Smolevichi in 2011 and to Smolevichi-STI in 2012. Smolevichi-STI won the 2012 Second League season, and have been playing in the First League since 2013. In January 2016, they reached the agreement with BATE Borisov to become Borisov's team farm club, although the partnership only lasted for one season.

In 2017, Smolevichi-STI finished second in the First League and were promoted. They made their Belarusian Premier League debut in 2018. In January 2018, they reverted their name back to FC Smolevichi.

In 2020, the club rejoined the top tier after finishing in 2nd place in the 2019 First League. They finished bottom of the first division in 2020, and following serious financial issues it was decided that FC Smolevichi would compete in the Belarusian Second League in 2021. Club disbanded after 2021 season.

=== Name changes ===
- 2009: founded as Vigvam Smolevichi
- 2011: renamed to FC Smolevichi
- 2012: renamed to Smolevichi-STI
- 2018: renamed to FC Smolevichi
