= 2017–18 Belarusian Cup =

Tournament details
- Country: Belarus
- Teams: 52

Final positions
- Champions: Dinamo Brest
- Runners-up: BATE Borisov

Tournament statistics
- Matches played: 55
- Goals scored: 170 (3.09 per match)

2017–18 Belarusian Cup was the 27th season of the Belarusian annual cup competition. Contrary to the league season, it was conducted in a fall-spring rhythm. The tournament started in May 2017 and concluded with the final match on 19 May 2018. Dinamo Brest defeated BATE Borisov 3–2 in the final, winning the Cup and qualifying for the second qualifying round of the 2018–19 UEFA Europa League.

== Participating clubs ==
The following teams took part in the competition:

2017 Belarusian Premier League all 16 teams	2017 Belarusian First League all 16 teams	2017 Belarusian Second League all 14 teams	Winners of regional cups 6 teams
BATE Borisov; Shakhtyor Soligorsk; Dinamo Minsk; Minsk; Torpedo-BelAZ Zhodino; Vitebsk; Isloch Minsk Raion; Dinamo Brest; Gorodeya; Slavia Mozyr; Krumkachy Minsk; Slutsk; Naftan Novopolotsk; Neman Grodno; Gomel; Dnepr Mogilev	Belshina Bobruisk; Granit Mikashevichi; Lokomotiv Gomel; Luch Minsk; Smorgon; Lida; Orsha; Smolevichi-STI; Torpedo Minsk; Energetik-BGU Minsk; Slonim-2017; Khimik Svetlogorsk; Baranovichi; Volna Pinsk; Osipovichi; Neman-Agro Stolbtsy	Oshmyany; Kletsk; Molodechno-DYuSSh-4; Chist; Viktoriya Maryina Gorka; Sputnik Rechitsa; UAS-DYuSSh-Zhitkovichi; Uzda; Lyuban; Energetik-BGATU Minsk; Sbornaya TF Gomel; SDYuShOR-3 Pinsk; SDYuShOR-8 Gomel; SMIautotrans Smolevichi	Ivatsevichi (Brest Oblast); Batski Gomel (Gomel Oblast); FSK Grodnenskiy (Grodno Oblast); DYuSSh-MTZ-Syabar Minsk (Minsk); Livadiya-Yuni Dzerzhinsk (Minsk Oblast); Kommunalnik Senno (Vitebsk Oblast)

== First round ==
In this round 4 amateur clubs were drawn against 4 Second League clubs. The draw was performed on 6 May 2017. The matches were played on 17 May 2017.

Another 2 amateur clubs and 10 Second League clubs were given a bye to the Second Round.

17 May 2017	Livadiya-Yuni Dzerzhinsk (A)	1–4	Uzda (III)	Dzerzhinsk
17:30	Klimikhin 5'	Report	Belash 38'; Korolchuk 46', 82'; Fisyuk 89'	Stadium: City Stadium; Attendance: 150; Referee: Kirill Pilipovets (Molodechno)

17 May 2017	Ivatsevichi (A)	5–0	Kletsk (III)	Bereza
18:00	Zybailo 23'; Verevka 34', 60'; Petrovskiy 54'; Shevchuk 61'	Report		Stadium: DYuSSh-1 Stadium; Attendance: 200; Referee: Aleksey Obelevskiy (Grodno)

17 May 2017	Kommunalnik Senno (A)	0–1	SMIautotrans Smolevichi (III)	Senno
18:30		Report	Bahdanaw 44'	Stadium: City Stadium; Attendance: 320; Referee: Amin Kurgheli (Gomel)

17 May 2017	Batski Gomel (A)	1–2	Viktoriya Maryina Gorka (III)	Gomel
19:00	Sigay 8'	Report	Petrushenya 5'; Gurinovich 36'	Stadium: SDYuSShOR-8 Stadium; Attendance: 50; Referee: Valeriy Golomzik (Bobruisk)

== Second round ==
In this round 4 winners of the First Round with 12 clubs that received a bye were drawn against 16 First League. The draw was performed on 22 May 2017. The matches were played on 14 June 2017.

14 June 2017	DYuSSh-MTZ-Syabar Minsk (A)	0–1	Neman-Agro Stolbtsy (II)	Minsk
14:30		Report	Botyanovskiy 33'	Stadium: BGATU Stadium; Attendance: 100; Referee: Stanisalav Ananyev (Vitebsk)

14 June 2017	FSK Grodnenskiy (A)	1–5	Smolevichi-STI (II)	Grodno
17:00	Pugach 80'	Report	Shkabara 4'; Gorbachik 7', 38'; Chikida 74'; Baiduk 86'	Stadium: Neman Stadium; Attendance: 100; Referee: Dmitry Kuradovets (Pinsk)

14 June 2017	SDYuShOR-3 Pinsk (III)	0–8	Orsha (II)	Pinsk
17:00		Report	Khodnevich 5', 8', 17', 28'; Kravchuk 10'; Ivanow 48'; Kitayev 67'; Zheleznikov 88'	Stadium: Football Academy Stadium; Attendance: 150; Referee: Pavel Yakovenko (Gomel)

14 June 2017	SDYuShOR-8 Gomel (III)	1–0	Osipovichi (II)	Gomel
17:30	Akhramovich 41'	Report		Stadium: SDYuShOR-8 Stadium; Attendance: 100; Referee: Ilya Lyashuk (Uzda)

14 June 2017	Viktoriya Maryina Gorka (III)	1–2	Belshina Bobruisk (II)	Maryina Gorka
18:00	Harkusha 67' (pen.)	Report	Veras 41'; Sherakow 64' (pen.)	Stadium: City Stadium; Attendance: 320; Referee: Amin Kurgkheli (Gomel)

14 June 2017	Ivatsevichi (A)	0–6	Torpedo Minsk (II)	Bereza
18:00		Report	Sapon 29'; Nikitin 48'; Patsko 53'; Lebedzew 69'; Dotsenko 85'; Tamelo 90+1'	Stadium: DYuSSh-1 Stadium; Attendance: 300; Referee: Yaroslav Komaritskiy (Polotsk)

14 June 2017	Sputnik Rechitsa (III)	0–3	Volna Pinsk (II)	Rechitsa
18:00		Report	Mrinsky 5', 90' (pen.); Bayko 6'	Stadium: Central Stadium; Attendance: 350; Referee: Kirill Pilipovets (Molodechno)

14 June 2017	Chist (III)	1–0	Khimik Svetlogorsk (II)	Chist
18:00	Pratskevich 39'	Report		Stadium: School Stadium; Attendance: 100; Referee: Artur Kunay (Brest)

14 June 2017	Oshmyany (III)	1–2	Luch Minsk (II)	Oshmyany
18:00	Ladutko 51'	Report	Khankevich 80', 82'	Stadium: FOK Stadium; Attendance: 100; Referee: Olga Tereshko (Molodechno)

14 June 2017	Energetik-BGATU Minsk (III)	1–4	Baranovichi (II)	Minsk
18:30	Alekseyenko 33'	Report	Domashevich 27', 48'; Kukharchik 85', 87'	Stadium: BGATU Stadium; Attendance: 120; Referee: Yevgeniy Sokolovskiy (Grodno)

14 June 2017	UAS-DYuSSh-Zhitkovichi (III)	2–1	Lida (II)	Zhitkovichi
18:30	Lagutin 34', 80'	Report	Lyavitski 74'	Stadium: City Stadium; Attendance: 400; Referee: Valentin Bliznyuk (Minsk)

14 June 2017	Uzda (III)	1–2	Granit Mikashevichi (II)	Uzda
18:30	Neronskiy 78'	Report	Nakhimov 72'; Vaitekhovich 76'	Stadium: City Stadium; Attendance: 200; Referee: Yevgeniy Kovalev (Minsk)

14 June 2017	SMIautotrans Smolevichi (III)	0–6	Slonim-2017 (II)	Smolevichi
19:00		Report	Kozel 7'; Chitanava 14'; Kharlanov 43'; Mochalov 78', 90+2'; Mikhaltsov 84'	Stadium: FOK Stadium; Attendance: 100; Referee: Nikolay Vasko (Minsk)

14 June 2017	Sbornaya TF Gomel (III)	0–2	Lokomotiv Gomel (II)	Gomel
19:00		Report	Golenko 42'; Zhila 84'	Stadium: Gomselmash Stadium; Attendance: 50; Referee: Sergey Lobatsevich (Vitebsk)

14 June 2017	Lyuban (III)	1–2	Smorgon (II)	Lyuban
19:00	Dubovskiy 43'	Report	Ganich 48'; Demidchik 72'	Stadium: City Stadium; Attendance: 300; Referee: Vitaly Krivchik (Minsk)

14 June 2017	Molodechno-DYuSSh-4 (III)	3–2	Energetik-BGU Minsk (II)	Molodechno
19:00	Bugay 61', 81'; Siyaka 90+1'	Report	Burets 59'; Plekhov 64'	Stadium: City Stadium; Attendance: 700; Referee: Sergey Krasnikov (Grodno)

== Round of 32 ==
In this round 16 winners of the Second Round were drawn against 16 Premier League clubs. The matches were played between 5 and 9 July 2017.

5 July 2017	SDYuShOR-8 Gomel (III)	0–7	Neman Grodno	Gomel
14:00		Report	Bombel 32'; Yablonskiy 41'; Zhurnevich 50', 85'; Khlebosolov 68', 77'; Kavalyonak 70'	Stadium: SDYuSShOR-8 Stadium; Attendance: 250; Referee: Nikita Pyreyev (Minsk)

5 July 2017	Volna Pinsk (II)	0–1	Minsk	Pinsk
18:30		Report	Amelyanchuk 40'	Stadium: Volna Stadium; Attendance: 850; Referee: Dmitry Dmitriyev (Fanipol)

6 July 2017	Orsha (II)	1–1 (a.e.t.) (4–3 p)	Slavia Mozyr	Orsha
18:00	Khodnevich 73' (pen.)	Report	Katlyaraw 90+1'	Stadium: City Stadium; Attendance: 700; Referee: Denis Scherbakov (Minsk)
	Penalties
	Hihevich (penalty scored); Shcharbakow (penalty scored); Prokopchik (penalty scored); Kitayev (penalty scored)		(penalty scored) Shevchenko; (penalty scored) Khadarkevich; (penalty scored) Zhuk; (penalty missed) Lemiechevsky; (penalty missed) Katlyaraw

7 July 2017	Smorgon (II)	1–4	Dinamo Brest	Smorgon
18:00	Ganich 52'	Report	Lyahchylin 14'; Osuchukwu 21'; Fameyeh 24', 69'	Stadium: Yunost Stadium; Attendance: 600; Referee: Anton Lashuk (Molodechno)

7 July 2017	Neman-Agro Stolbtsy (II)	1–5	BATE Borisov	Stolbtsy
18:30	Tishko 45+1'	Report	Rušević 26', 27', 72'; M.Valadzko 62'; Mukhamedov 64'	Stadium: City Stadium; Attendance: 1,800; Referee: Andrey Vasilevich (Mozyr)

8 July 2017	Baranovichi (II)	0–1	Naftan Novopolotsk	Baranovichi
16:30		Report	Kazlow 35'	Stadium: Lokomotiv Stadium; Attendance: 850; Referee: Sergey Gorayutin (Minsk)

8 July 2017	Smolevichi-STI (II)	0–2	Torpedo-BelAZ Zhodino	Smolevichi
17:00		Report	Zubovich 25'; Hovhannisyan 77'	Stadium: Ozyorny Stadium; Attendance: 900; Referee: Sergey Lobatsevich (Vitebsk)

8 July 2017	Lokomotiv Gomel (II)	0–1	Vitebsk	Gomel
17:15		Report	Volkov 89'	Stadium: SDYuSShOR-8 Stadium; Attendance: 400; Referee: Igor Kruk (Molodechno)

8 July 2017	Torpedo Minsk (II)	0–0 (a.e.t.) (2–3 p)	Gomel	Minsk
17:30		Report		Stadium: Torpedo Stadium; Attendance: 800; Referee: Sergey Tsinkevich (Osipovichi)
	Penalties
	Tamelo (penalty missed); Nikitin (penalty scored); Kuntsevich (penalty missed); Grechikha (penalty scored); Lovets (penalty missed)		(penalty missed) Yudenkov; (penalty scored) Adomako; (penalty scored) Barsukow; (penalty scored) Sazonovich; (penalty missed) Chmyrikov

8 July 2017	UAS-DYuSSh-Zhitkovichi (III)	0–3 (a.e.t.)	Slutsk	Zhitkovichi
18:00		Report	Rushnitsky 95', 107', 113'	Stadium: City Stadium; Attendance: 1,500; Referee: Yevgeniy Naumov (Minsk)

8 July 2017	Molodechno-DYuSSh-4 (III)	0–3	Krumkachy Minsk	Molodechno
18:00		Report	Korsak 20'; Yashin 27'; Vasilewski 85'	Stadium: City Stadium; Attendance: 1,700; Referee: Amin Kurgheli (Gomel)

8 July 2017	Granit Mikashevichi (II)	0–2	Gorodeya	Luninets
18:30		Report	Lebedzew 15', 41'	Stadium: Polesye Stadium; Attendance: 450; Referee: Sergey Chistov (Minsk)

9 July 2017	Slonim-2017 (II)	1–1 (a.e.t.) (3–4 p)	Dnepr Mogilev	Slonim
16:30	Kozel 59'	Report	Bashlay 90+2'	Stadium: Yunost Stadium; Attendance: 2,080; Referee: Vladimir Rusakov (Minsk)
	Penalties
	Kostyuchik (penalty scored); Zhukov (penalty missed); Kharlanov (penalty scored); Pogodin (penalty scored); Chitanava (penalty missed)		(penalty scored) Bashlay; (penalty scored) Shepelew; (penalty scored) Levitskiy; (penalty scored) Fedosov

9 July 2017	Chist (III)	0–4	Dinamo Minsk	Chist
17:30		Report	Nikolić 20', 26'; Kiyko 68', 80'	Stadium: School Stadium; Attendance: 1,000; Referee: Yevgeniy Koval (Grodno)

9 July 2017	Belshina Bobruisk (II)	1–4	Isloch Minsk Raion	Bobruisk
18:00	Kandratsyew 40'	Report	Kholodinsky 37', 74'; Lynko 69', 78'	Stadium: Spartak Stadium; Attendance: 980; Referee: Sergey Stetsurin (Brest)

9 July 2017	Luch Minsk (II)	1–5	Shakhtyor Soligorsk	Minsk
18:30	Buloychyk 89'	Report	Bagarić 37', 67'; Yanush 41' (pen.), 45+2'; Alyakhnovich 90+1'	Stadium: SOK Olimpiysky; Attendance: 700; Referee: Viktor Shimusik (Osipovichi)

== Round of 16 ==
Most of the matches were played on 22 and 23 July 2017.

22 July 2017	Naftan Novopolotsk	1–2	Krumkachy Minsk	Novopolotsk
17:00	Kolesnik 72'	Report	Ivanow 65'; Bohunov 89'	Stadium: Atlant Stadium; Attendance: 200; Referee: Igor Kruk (Molodechno)

22 July 2017	Isloch Minsk Raion	2–1 (a.e.t.)	Gorodeya	Minsk
17:30	Slabashevich 61'; Bliznyuk 115'	Report	Dubajić 56'	Stadium: FC Minsk Stadium; Attendance: 500; Referee: Sergey Tsinkevich (Osipovichi)

22 July 2017	Neman Grodno	1–0	Minsk	Grodno
18:00	Savitski 10'	Report		Stadium: Neman Stadium; Attendance: 1,800; Referee: Sergey Lobatsevich (Vitebsk)

23 July 2017	Dinamo Minsk	0–1	Dnepr Mogilev	Minsk
16:15		Report	Dzhigero 43'	Stadium: Traktor Stadium; Attendance: 1,100; Referee: Dmitry Dmitriyev (Fanipol)

23 July 2017	Vitebsk	0–0 (a.e.t.) (2–4 p)	Slutsk	Vitebsk
17:00		Report		Stadium: Vitebsky CSK; Attendance: 1,750; Referee: Aleksei Kulbakov (Gomel)
	Penalties
	Kvashuk (penalty scored); Naumov (penalty scored); Salavey (penalty missed); Babichev (penalty missed)		(penalty scored) Bobko; (penalty missed) Zaleski; (penalty scored) Safonov; (penalty scored) Kibuk; (penalty scored) Yusov

23 July 2017	Dinamo Brest	2–1	Gomel	Brest
17:30	Sedko 28'; Fameyeh 75'	Report	Aydov 20' (pen.)	Stadium: OSK Brestsky; Attendance: 3,850; Referee: Denis Scherbakov (Minsk)

23 July 2017	Shakhtyor Soligorsk	6–0	Orsha (II)	Soligorsk
18:00	Crepulja 16', 77'; Lisakovich 45+1'; Yanushkevich 49'; Varabyow 79' (o.g.); Khilkevich 85' (o.g.)	Report		Stadium: Stroitel Stadium; Attendance: 750; Referee: Yevgeniy Naumov (Minsk)

12 November 2017	BATE Borisov	2–1 (a.e.t.)	Torpedo-BelAZ Zhodino	Borisov
17:00	Signevich 90+3'; Rodionov 101'	Report	Zubovich 69'	Stadium: Borisov Arena; Referee: Sergey Lobatsevich (Vitebsk)

== Quarter-finals ==
The draw was made on 28 July 2017. The matches were played in March 2018.

Team 1	Agg.	Team 2	1st leg	2nd leg
Krumkachy Minsk	0–6	Neman Grodno	0–3	0–3
Shakhtyor Soligorsk	3–3 (a)	Dnepr Mogilev	3–1	0–2
Dinamo Brest	4–1	Slutsk	2–0	2–1
Isloch Minsk Raion	2–4	BATE Borisov	1–2	1–2

=== First leg ===
11 March 2018	Krumkachy Minsk	0–3	Neman Grodno	Minsk
14:00		Report		Stadium: KPF Minsk

11 March 2018	Shakhtyor Soligorsk	3–1	Dnepr Mogilev	Soligorsk
16:00	Bardachow 49'; Soiri 73'; Kavalyow 90+1'	Report	Barsukow 19'	Stadium: Shakhtyor Stadium; Attendance: 1,000; Referee: Andrey Vasilevich (Mozyr)

14 March 2018	Dinamo Brest	2–0	Slutsk	Brest
16:30	Fameyeh 54'; Hawrylovich 90+3'	Report		Stadium: Yunost Stadium; Attendance: 2,500; Referee: Sergey Tsinkevich (Osipovichi)

14 March 2018	Isloch Minsk Raion	1–2	BATE Borisov	Minsk
18:30	Kholodinsky 74'	Report	Signevich 32', 39'	Stadium: FC Minsk Stadium; Attendance: 580; Referee: Dmitry Dmitriyev (Fanipol)

=== Second leg ===
17 March 2018	Neman Grodno	3–0 (6–0 agg.)	Krumkachy Minsk	Grodno
14:00		Report		Stadium: Neman Stadium

17 March 2018	Dnepr Mogilev	2–0 ((a) 3–3 agg.)	Shakhtyor Soligorsk	Bobruisk
16:30	Fedosov 59', 72'	Report		Stadium: Aleksandr Prokopenko Stadium; Attendance: 350; Referee: Dmitry Dolya (Grodno)

18 March 2018	Slutsk	1–2 (1–4 agg.)	Dinamo Brest	Minsk
14:30	Shikavka 58'	Report	Savitski 14'; Fameyeh 85'	Stadium: Football Manege; Attendance: 1,250; Referee: Denis Scherbakov (Minsk)

18 March 2018	BATE Borisov	2–1 (4–2 agg.)	Isloch Minsk Raion	Borisov
17:00	Ivanić 62', 65'	Report	Asipenka 28'	Stadium: Borisov Arena; Attendance: 3,678; Referee: Igor Kruk (Molodechno)

1. Krumkachy forfeited both matches against Neman. The club did not have enough players to field, after BFF imposed ban on registering the new players, as a punishment for repeated financial violations by the club in the recent seasons.

== Semi-finals ==
The draw was made on 19 March 2018. The matches will be played in April and May 2018.

Team 1	Agg.	Team 2	1st leg	2nd leg
BATE Borisov	2–0	Neman Grodno	2–0	0–0
Dinamo Brest	6–1	Dnepr Mogilev	2–0	4–1

=== First leg ===
18 April 2018	BATE Borisov	2–0	Neman Grodno	Borisov
18:45	Ivanić 18'; Gordeichuk 29'	Report		Stadium: Borisov Arena; Attendance: 3,791; Referee: Viktor Shimusik (Osipovichi)

18 April 2018	Dinamo Brest	2–0	Dnepr Mogilev	Brest
20:45	Savitski 40'; Fameyeh 52'	Report		Stadium: OSK Brestskiy; Attendance: 7,000; Referee: Sergey Gorayutin (Minsk)

=== Second leg ===
2 May 2018	Dnepr Mogilev	1–4 (1–6 agg.)	Dinamo Brest	Mogilev
17:45	Levitskiy 90'	Report	Milevskyi 22'; Fameyeh 55'; Yuzepchuk 70', 82'	Stadium: Spartak Stadium; Referee: Dmitry Dmitriyev (Fanipol)

2 May 2018	Neman Grodno	0–0 (0–2 agg.)	BATE Borisov	Grodno
19:45		Report		Stadium: Neman Stadium; Attendance: 2,200; Referee: Andrey Vasilevich (Mozyr)

== Final ==
The final was played on 19 May 2018 at Spartak Stadium in Mogilev.

19 May 2018
18:30 UTC+3

BATE Borisov	2–3	Dinamo Brest
Ivanić 13', 49'	Report	Milevskyi 34'; Fameyeh 74'; Nyakhaychyk 89'

Spartak Stadium, Mogilev
Attendance: 7,200
Referee: Sergey Tsinkevich (Osipovichi)

BATE:
GK	48	(Belarus) Denis Scherbitskiy
RB	4	(Serbia) Aleksandar Filipović
CB	5	(Belarus) Yevgeniy Yablonskiy
CB	23	(Belarus) Zakhar Volkov
LB	42	(Belarus) Maksim Volodko	(yellow card) 90+5'
DM	25	(Belarus) Dzmitry Baha
DM	21	(Belarus) Stanislaw Drahun
RM	22	(Belarus) Ihar Stasevich (c)
CAM	11	(Belarus) Alexander Hleb		(substituted off) 79'
LM	10	(Montenegro) Mirko Ivanić
FW	13	(Belarus) Mikalay Signevich
Substitutes:
GK	35	(Belarus) Anton Chichkan
DF	6	(Serbia) Nikola Vasiljević
MF	7	(Belarus) Yevgeniy Berezkin
FW	15	(Belarus) Maksim Skavysh	(yellow card) 86'	(substituted on) 79'
DF	34	(Belarus) Artem Shkurdyuk
DF	44	(Belarus) Vladislav Malkevich
FW	45	(Belarus) Vladislav Mukhamedov
Manager:
(Belarus) Oleg Dulub

DINAMO:
GK	30	(Belarus) Alyaksandr Hutar
RB	21	(Belarus) Aleh Veratsila
CB	16	(Greece) Giannis Kargas
CB	4	(Belarus) Alyaksey Hawrylovich (c)
LB	13	(Belarus) Maksim Vitus
DM	99	(Nigeria) Chidi Osuchukwu
DM	17	(Belarus) Pavel Sedko		(substituted off) 71'
RM	88	(Belarus) Pavel Savitski
CAM	7	(Ukraine) Artem Milevskyi	(yellow card) 90+5'
LM	33	(Belarus) Pavel Nyakhaychyk	(yellow card) 77'
FW	9	(Austria) Sandro Gotal		(substituted off) 71'
Substitutes:
GK	35	(Belarus) Pavel Pavlyuchenko
DF	5	(Belarus) Andrey Lebedzew
FW	10	(Belarus) Raman Vasilyuk		(substituted on) 90+3'
FW	20	(Ghana) Joel Fameyeh		(substituted on) 71' (substituted off) 90+3'
FW	25	(Belarus) Kirill Kirilenko
MF	31	(Belarus) Andrey Zaleski
MF	55	(Slovenia) Željko Filipović		(substituted on) 71'
Manager:
(Belarus) Sergey Kovalchuk
