= 2019–20 Belarusian Cup =

Tournament details
- Country: Belarus
- Teams: 52

Final positions
- Champions: BATE Borisov
- Runners-up: Dynamo Brest

Tournament statistics
- Matches played: 54
- Goals scored: 203 (3.76 per match)
- Top goal scorer: Yegor Pitsyk (5 goals)

2019–20 Belarusian Cup was the 29th season of the Belarusian annual cup competition. Contrary to the league season, it is conducted in a fall-spring rhythm. It started on 22 May 2019 and will conclude with the final match in May 2020. BATE Borisov won the Cup and qualified for the second qualifying round of the 2020–21 UEFA Europa League.

== Participating clubs ==
The following teams took part in the competition:

| 2019 Belarusian Premier League all 16 teams | 2019 Belarusian First League all 15 teams | 2019 Belarusian Second League; 15 teams (of 16) | Winners of regional cups 6 teams |
| BATE Borisov; Shakhtyor Soligorsk; Dinamo Minsk; Vitebsk; Torpedo-BelAZ Zhodino; Dinamo Brest; Neman Grodno; Slutsk; Gorodeya; Isloch Minsk Raion; Minsk; Gomel; Dnyapro Mogilev; Torpedo Minsk; Slavia Mozyr; Energetik-BGU Minsk | Smolevichi; Belshina Bobruisk; Lida; Naftan Novopolotsk; Lokomotiv Gomel; Slonim-2017; Granit Mikashevichi; Khimik Svetlogorsk; Smorgon; Orsha; Volna Pinsk; Baranovichi; Rukh Brest; NFK Minsk; Sputnik Rechitsa | UAS Zhitkovichi; Underdog Chist; Oshmyany; Uzda; Osipovichi; Ivatsevichi; Viktoriya Maryina Gorka; Molodechno; SMIautotrans Smolevichi; Neman-Agro Stolbtsy; Kletsk; Energetik-BGATU Minsk; Gorki; Arsenal Dzerzhinsk; DYuSSh-3-Stanles Pinsk | DYuSSh Pinsk Raion (Brest Oblast); Montazhnik Mozyr (Gomel Oblast); PK Kremko Kvasovka (Grodno Oblast); Fenix Minsk (Minsk); Servolyuks-Agro Mezhisetki (Mogilev Oblast); Detskoselskiy Gorodok (Vitebsk Oblast) |

== First round ==
In this round 6 amateur clubs were drawn against 6 Second League clubs. The draw was performed on 3 May 2019. The matches were played on 22 May 2019.

| 22 May 2019 | Servolyuks-Agro Mezhisetki (A) | 2–6 | Ivatsevichi (III) | Mogilev |
| 16:00 | Sekatskiy 14'; Burenkov 21' | Report | Sinyak 29'; Pitsyk 39', 62', 83'; Voronovich 78'; Petrovskiy 82' | Stadium: MGUP Stadium; Attendance: 50; Referee: Sergey Chistov (Minsk) |

| 22 May 2019 | Montazhnik Mozyr (A) | 3–1 | DYuSSh-3-Stanles Pinsk (III) | Kozenki |
| 17:00 | Kachenya 8', 90+3'; Pikuza 89' | Report | Kurgan 41' | Stadium: Polesye Stadium; Attendance: 200; Referee: Nikita Shiyan (Dzerzhinsk) |

| 22 May 2019 | Detskoselskiy Gorodok (A) | 1–1 (a.e.t.) (6–7 p) | SMIautotrans Smolevichi (III) | Gorodok |
| 18:00 | Izofatov 89' | Report | Mikheyenko 58' | Stadium: City Stadium; Attendance: 150; Referee: Alyaksey Sysoyew (Osipovichi) |
| | Penalties |
| | Kosak (penalty scored); Lebedzew (penalty missed); Baranok (penalty scored); Demin (penalty scored); Izofatov (penalty scored); Shashko (penalty scored); Klopov (penalty scored); Shantur (penalty scored) | | (penalty scored) Simonchik; (penalty missed) Smolsky; (penalty scored) Kishkurno; (penalty scored) Voronovich; (penalty scored) Sorochinskiy; (penalty scored) Marinich; (penalty scored) Rudenok; (penalty scored) Sokolovskiy |

| 22 May 2019 | PK Kremko Kvasovka (A) | 2–1 | Energetik-BGATU Minsk (III) | Grodno |
| 18:00 | Vasilevskiy 15'; Zhegalo 37' | Report | Galagush 81' | Stadium: Neman Stadium; Attendance: 60; Referee: Zakhar Digilevich (Zhodino) |

| 22 May 2019 | DYuSSh Pinsk Raion (A) | 1–3 | Underdog Chist (III) | Pinsk |
| 18:00 | Leshkevich 2' | Report | Novik 4' (pen.); Tolkachev 61' (o.g.); Belevich 63' | Stadium: Volna Stadium; Attendance: 130; Referee: Yevgeniy Sokolovskiy (Grodno) |

| 22 May 2019 | Fenix Minsk (A) | 0–5 | Viktoriya Maryina Gorka (III) | Maryina Gorka |
| 18:00 | | Report | Radyuk 22'; Lagutko 40'; Kudanov 51'; Petrushenya 62'; Sharipov 78' | Stadium: City Stadium; Attendance: 70; Referee: Maksim Kachalyuk (Brest) |

== Second round ==
In this round 6 winners of the first round were joined by another 22 clubs. The draw was performed on 23 May 2019. The matches were played on 12 June 2019.

| 12 June 2019 | UAS Zhitkovichi (III) | (w/o) | NFK Minsk (II) | Zhitkovichi |
| | | Report | | Stadium: City Stadium |

| 12 June 2019 | Viktoriya Maryina Gorka (III) | 2–3 | Sputnik Rechitsa (II) | Maryina Gorka |
| 16:00 | Lizunow 50', 57' | Report | Shreitor 39'; Likhtin 73'; Lagutin 90+4' | Stadium: City Stadium; Attendance: 50; Referee: Aleksey Obelevskiy (Grodno) |

| 12 June 2019 | Montazhnik Mozyr (A) | 0–1 | Naftan Novopolotsk (II) | Kozenki |
| 17:30 | | Report | Laval 38' (pen.) | Stadium: Polesye Stadium; Attendance: 240; Referee: Vitaliy Onikhimovskiy (Minsk) |

| 12 June 2019 | Osipovichi (III) | 0–1 | Smolevichi (II) | Osipovichi |
| 18:00 | | Report | A.Makaraw 90+1' | Stadium: Yunost Stadium; Attendance: 450; Referee: Sergey Lobatsevich (Vitebsk) |

| 12 June 2019 | Underdog Chist (III) | 1–3 | Lida (II) | Chist |
| 18:00 | Novik 81' | Report | Leonovich 10'; Pasevich 52', 73' | Stadium: School Stadium; Attendance: 230; Referee: Viktor Shimusik (Osipovichi) |

| 12 June 2019 | Ivatsevichi (III) | 2–3 (a.e.t.) | Rukh Brest (II) | Ivatsevichi |
| 18:00 | Pitsyk 42' (pen.), 47' (pen.) | Report | Teslyuk 35' (pen.); German 84'; Litskevich 101' (o.g.) | Stadium: Klenovka-Arena; Attendance: 300; Referee: Sergey Krasnikov (Grodno) |

| 12 June 2019 | Oshmyany (III) | 2–1 | Khimik Svetlogorsk (II) | Oshmyany |
| 18:00 | Skvorchevskiy 4'; Kupnevsky 10' | Report | Komarov 52' | Stadium: FOK Stadium; Attendance: 200; Referee: Sergey Chistov (Minsk) |

| 12 June 2019 | SMIautotrans Smolevichi (III) | 0–6 | Smorgon (II) | Oktyabrsky |
| 18:30 | | Report | Shuhunkow 25'; Ganich 37'; Yakubovich 45'; Demidchik 59'; Smunev 70'; Sorokin 77' | Stadium: FOK Oktyabrsky; Attendance: 75; Referee: Amin Kurgheli (Gomel) |

| 12 June 2019 | Molodechno (III) | 0–5 | Arsenal Dzerzhinsk (III) | Molodechno |
| 18:30 | | Report | Patsko 15', 85'; Hleb 22' (pen.); Kiyko 50'; Maksumov 74' | Stadium: City Stadium; Attendance: 350; Referee: Yaroslav Komaritskiy (Polotsk) |

| 12 June 2019 | Uzda (III) | 1–2 | Belshina Bobruisk (II) | Uzda |
| 19:00 | Zhdanok 79' | Report | Bordukov 21'; Yushin 54' | Stadium: City Stadium; Attendance: 300; Referee: Dmitry Dolya (Grodno) |

| 12 June 2019 | PK Kremko Kvasovka (A) | 0–2 | Slonim-2017 (II) | Grodno |
| 19:00 | | Report | Kuchmel 27'; Zaboronko 45+1' | Stadium: Neman Stadium; Attendance: 50; Referee: Kirill Pilipovets (Molodechno) |

| 12 June 2019 | Gorki (III) | 0–3 | Volna Pinsk (II) | Gorki |
| 19:00 | | Report | Nevdakh 34'; Golovko 45+1'; Rassolko 49' | Stadium: City Stadium; Attendance: 370; Referee: Ilya Lyashuk (Uzda) |

| 12 June 2019 | Neman-Agro Stolbtsy (III) | 1–2 | Baranovichi (II) | Stolbtsy |
| 19:00 | Dovbeyko 5' | Report | Pyatrenka 50'; Bury 54' | Stadium: Yunost Stadium; Attendance: 300; Referee: Sergey S. Lobatsevich (Vetka) |

| 12 June 2019 | Kletsk (III) | 2–2 (a.e.t.) (5–3 p) | Orsha (II) | Kletsk |
| 19:00 | Timokhovets 63'; Plechistik 81' | Report | Kozorez 42'; Berezun 58' | Stadium: City Stadium; Attendance: 100; Referee: Yevgeniy Yasenovich (Minsk) |
| | Penalties |
| | Golovnyov (penalty scored); Lekhavitsky (penalty scored); Glaz (penalty scored); Gurko (penalty scored); Naporko (penalty scored) | | (penalty scored) Kozorez; (penalty scored) Karpov; (penalty scored) Ivanow; (penalty missed) Kucherov |

1. UAS Zhitkovichi withdrew from the cup due to financial troubles.

== Round of 32 ==
In this round 14 winners of the second round were joined by another 18 clubs. The draw was performed on 13 June 2019. The matches were played on 24–28 July 2019. Four matches involving European Cups participants were played earlier, on 26 June 2019.

| 26 June 2019 | Slonim-2017 (II) | 1–3 | Vitebsk | Slonim |
| 17:30 | Tishko 87' | Report | Ryzhkov 2'; Fedosov 43'; Nurisov 51' | Stadium: Yunost Stadium; Attendance: 350; Referee: Dmitry Dmitriyev (Fanipol) |

| 26 June 2019 | Smolevichi (II) | 0–2 | Shakhtyor Soligorsk | Smolevichi |
| 18:00 | | Report | Balanovich 22' (pen.); Yanush 54' | Stadium: Ozyorny Stadium; Attendance: 550; Referee: Andrey Vasilevich (Mozyr) |

| 26 June 2019 | Sputnik Rechitsa (II) | 2–5 | BATE Borisov | Rechitsa |
| 18:30 | Kazlovskiy 72'; Shreitor 86' | Report | Tuominen 16'; Natkho 21'; Saroka 30'; Simović 45'; Willumsson 81' | Stadium: Central Stadium; Attendance: 3,000; Referee: Denis Scherbakov (Minsk) |

| 26 June 2019 | Granit Mikashevichi (II) | 0–2 | Dinamo Minsk | Luninets |
| 19:00 | | Report | Ksenofontov 46'; Zubovich 86' | Stadium: Polesye Stadium; Attendance: 520; Referee: Viktor Shimusik (Osipovichi) |

| 24 July 2019 | Baranovichi (II) | 1–7 | Torpedo-BelAZ Zhodino | Baranovichi |
| 18:00 | Pyatrenka 12' | Report | Salavey 9'; Myshenko 27'; Gorbachik 39'; Yusov 54'; Bukorac 61'; Klimovich 66'; Obradović 90+1' (pen.) | Stadium: Lokomotiv Stadium; Attendance: 300; Referee: Vladimir Rusakov (Minsk) |

| 24 July 2019 | Naftan Novopolotsk (II) | 2–1 (a.e.t.) | Neman Grodno | Novopolotsk |
| 18:30 | Tamelo 90' (pen.); Krasiy 108' (pen.) | Report | Zabelin 8' | Stadium: Atlant Stadium; Attendance: 400; Referee: Pavel Koronets (Zhodino) |

| 27 July 2019 | Smorgon (II) | 1–4 | Gomel | Smorgon |
| 17:00 | Kabachevskiy 78' | Report | Shramchenko 14'; Nivaldo 17'; Bolov 44'; Kvashuk 69' (pen.) | Stadium: Yunost Stadium; Attendance: 200; Referee: Sergey Stetsurin (Brest) |

| 27 July 2019 | Lokomotiv Gomel (II) | 3–0 | Gorodeya | Gomel |
| 17:30 | Sviridenko 22' (pen.); Solovey 41'; Starostin 89' | Report | | Stadium: Lokomotiv Stadium; Attendance: 560; Referee: Yevgeniy Yasenovich (Minsk) |

| 27 July 2019 | NFK Minsk (II) | 1–3 (a.e.t.) | Slavia Mozyr | Minsk |
| 18:00 | Koshal 77' (pen.) | Report | Slyusar 54'; Pyatrenka 101'; Solovey 118' | Stadium: SOK Olimpiysky; Attendance: 200; Referee: Yevgeniy Koval (Grodno) |

| 27 July 2019 | Volna Pinsk (II) | 1–3 | Dnyapro Mogilev | Pinsk |
| 18:30 | Dzemidovich 88' (pen.) | Report | Pobudey 53'; Ignatenko 54'; Batyschev 76' | Stadium: Volna Stadium; Attendance: 770; Referee: Sergey Gorayutin (Minsk) |

| 27 July 2019 | Rukh Brest (II) | 0–1 | Dinamo Brest | Brest |
| 19:45 | | Report | Vasiliev 22' | Stadium: OSK Brestsky; Attendance: 5,600; Referee: Amin Kurgheli (Gomel) |

| 28 July 2019 | Arsenal Dzerzhinsk (III) | 0–6 | Energetik-BGU Minsk | Dzerzhinsk |
| 17:00 | | Report | Shkurin 17', 22'; Tweh 49'; Sovpel 65'; Wictor 81'; Sadovsky 86' | Stadium: City Stadium; Attendance: 900; Referee: Sergey Tsinkevich (Osipovichi) |

| 28 July 2019 | Oshmyany (III) | 1–3 | Isloch Minsk Raion | Oshmyany |
| 17:30 | Kuchmel 20' | Report | Kamarowski 62' (pen.); Afanasyev 67'; Karpovich 82' | Stadium: FOK Stadium; Attendance: 500; Referee: Yevgeniy Naumov (Minsk) |

| 28 July 2019 | Belshina Bobruisk (II) | 1–3 | Minsk | Bobruisk |
| 18:00 | Rutskiy 83' (pen.) | Report | Shevchenko 35'; Bakhar 40', 52' | Stadium: Spartak Stadium; Attendance: 1,650; Referee: Dmitry Dolya (Grodno) |

| 28 July 2019 | Lida (II) | 3–3 (a.e.t.) (2–3 p) | Slutsk | Lida |
| 18:30 | Karp 26'; Zyanko 70', 76' | Report | Serdyuk 2', 52'; Semenov 61' | Stadium: Yunost Stadium; Attendance: 500; Referee: Andrey Vasilevich (Mozyr) |
| | Penalties |
| | Pasevich (penalty scored); Leonovich (penalty scored); Maiboroda (penalty missed); Sidor (penalty missed); Kutsepalov (penalty missed) | | (penalty scored) Pustozyorov; (penalty scored) Nazarenko; (penalty scored) Obrazaw; (penalty missed) Oyedele; (penalty missed) Kouadio |

| 28 July 2019 | Kletsk (III) | 2–7 | Torpedo Minsk | Kletsk |
| 19:00 | Plechistik 77'; Golovnyov 85' | Report | Lynko 6'; Podberezskiy 53'; Ivanovich 55', 57'; Kazakow 56', 61'; Yakavitskiy 90' | Stadium: City Stadium; Attendance: 300; Referee: Yaroslav Komaritskiy (Polotsk) |

== Round of 16 ==
The draw was performed on 29 July 2019. The matches will be played on 3 and 4 August 2019.

| 3 August 2019 | Energetik-BGU Minsk | 2–3 | Isloch Minsk Raion | Minsk |
| 16:00 | Wictor 63'; Tweh 81' | Report | Yanushkevich 8'; Yansane 15'; Kamarowski 64' | Stadium: RCOP-BGU Stadium; Attendance: 700; Referee: Andrey Vasilevich (Mozyr) |

| 3 August 2019 | Dinamo Minsk | 3–1 (a.e.t.) | Gomel | Minsk |
| 17:00 | Hawrylovich 44'; Zubovich 99'; Fatai 115' | Report | Lutsevich 89' | Stadium: Dinamo Stadium; Attendance: 1,307; Referee: Dmitry Dolya (Grodno) |

| 3 August 2019 | BATE Borisov | 8–1 | Torpedo Minsk | Borisov |
| 18:00 | Mukhamedov 10'; Moukam 15', 36', 85'; Dubajić 41' (pen.); Myakish 65'; Tuominen 67', 76' | Report | Kazakow 19' | Stadium: Borisov Arena; Attendance: 3,085; Referee: Sergey Stetsurin (Brest) |

| 3 August 2019 | Dinamo Brest | 3–1 | Minsk | Brest |
| 19:00 | Noyok 60'; Nyakhaychyk 75'; Yuzepchuk 87' | Report | Nasibulin 12' | Stadium: OSK Brestsky; Attendance: 6,203; Referee: Vitaly Sevostyanik (Grodno) |

| 4 August 2019 | Naftan Novopolotsk (II) | 1–4 | Torpedo-BelAZ Zhodino | Novopolotsk |
| 15:00 | Krasiy 10' | Report | Obradović 25', 48'; Salavey 28'; Yusov 76' | Stadium: Atlant Stadium; Attendance: 350; Referee: Amin Kurgheli (Gomel) |

| 4 August 2019 | Dnyapro Mogilev | 2–1 | Slutsk | Mogilev |
| 16:00 | Bondarenko 45+1'; Pobudey 79' | Report | Serdyuk 67' | Stadium: Spartak Stadium; Attendance: 2,800; Referee: Yevgeniy Naumov (Minsk) |

| 4 August 2019 | Slavia Mozyr | 3–1 | Vitebsk | Mozyr |
| 17:00 | Slyusar 35' (pen.), 52'; Melnikov 37' | Report | Pyachenin 22' | Stadium: Yunost Stadium; Attendance: 3,250; Referee: Dmitry Dmitriyev (Fanipol) |

| 4 August 2019 | Lokomotiv Gomel (II) | 1–2 | Shakhtyor Soligorsk | Gomel |
| 18:00 | Krawchanka 89' | Report | Khvashchynski 2'; Antić 31' | Stadium: Lokomotiv Stadium; Attendance: 1,700; Referee: Denis Scherbakov (Minsk) |

== Quarter-finals ==
| Team 1 | Agg. | Team 2 | 1st leg | 2nd leg |
|---|---|---|---|---|
| Dnyapro Mogilev (II) | w/o | Slavia Mozyr | | |
| Torpedo-BelAZ Zhodino | 0–3 | Shakhtyor Soligorsk | 0–1 | 0–2 |
| Dinamo Minsk | 3–5 | BATE Borisov | 1–2 | 2–3 |
| Dinamo Brest | 0–0 (5–3 p) | Isloch Minsk Raion | 0–0 | 0–0 |

1. Slavia Mozyr advanced further after Dnyapro Mogilev disbanded.

=== First leg ===
| 9 March 2020 | Torpedo-BelAZ Zhodino | 0–1 | Shakhtyor Soligorsk | Zhodino |
| 18:00 | | Report | Bodul 9' | Stadium: Torpedo Stadium; Attendance: 2,420; Referee: Dmitry Dmitriyev (Fanipol) |

| 9 March 2020 | Dinamo Minsk | 1–2 | BATE Borisov | Minsk |
| 20:00 | Alyakhnovich 35' | Report | Skavysh 43'; Nyakhaychyk 63' | Stadium: Dinamo Stadium; Attendance: 9,805; Referee: Sergey Tsinkevich (Osipovichi) |

| 10 March 2020 | Dinamo Brest | 0–0 | Isloch Minsk Raion | Brest |
| 20:00 | | Report | | Stadium: OSK Brestsky; Attendance: 5,127; Referee: Vitaly Sevostyanik (Grodno) |

=== Second leg ===
| 14 March 2020 | Shakhtyor Soligorsk | 2–0 (3–0 agg.) | Torpedo-BelAZ Zhodino | Soligorsk |
| 16:00 | Kendysh 88', 90+4' | Report | | Stadium: Stroitel Stadium; Attendance: 1,102; Referee: Denis Scherbakov (Minsk) |

| 14 March 2020 | BATE Borisov | 3–2 (5–3 agg.) | Dinamo Minsk | Borisov |
| 18:30 | Baha 21'; Filipenko 45+1'; Skavysh 84' | Report | Rios 10', 43' | Stadium: Borisov Arena; Attendance: 7,113; Referee: Amin Kurgheli (Gomel) |

| 15 March 2020 | Isloch Minsk Raion | 0–0 (a.e.t.) (0–0 agg.) (3–5 p) | Dinamo Brest | Minsk |
| 15:00 | | Report | | Stadium: FC Minsk Stadium; Attendance: 1,060; Referee: Andrey Vasilevich (Mozyr) |
| | Penalties |
| | Yanush (penalty scored); Tsveiba (penalty scored); Rybak (penalty scored); Krasnov (penalty missed) | | (penalty scored) Bykov; (penalty scored) Noyok; (penalty scored) Pavlovets; (penalty scored) Laptsew; (penalty scored) Kislyak |

== Semi-finals ==
| Team 1 | Agg. | Team 2 | 1st leg | 2nd leg |
|---|---|---|---|---|
| Dinamo Brest | 4–4 (a) | Shakhtyor Soligorsk | 2–0 | 2–4 |
| Slavia Mozyr | 1–2 | BATE Borisov | 1–0 | 0–2 |

=== First leg ===
| 8 April 2020 | Slavia Mozyr | 1–0 | BATE Borisov | Mozyr |
| 17:30 | Pantya 11' | Report | | Stadium: Yunost Stadium; Attendance: 1,350; Referee: Vitaly Sevostyanik (Grodno) |

| 8 April 2020 | Dinamo Brest | 2–0 | Shakhtyor Soligorsk | Brest |
| 19:30 | Noyok 6'; Savitski 13' | Report | | Stadium: OSK Brestsky; Attendance: 813; Referee: Amin Kurgheli (Gomel) |

=== Second leg ===
| 29 April 2020 | Shakhtyor Soligorsk | 4–2 (4–4 (a) agg.) | Dinamo Brest | Soligorsk |
| 18:00 | Ivanović 58'; Lisakovich 60', 66' (pen.); Padstrelaw 73' | Report | Savitski 20'; Gordeichuk 38' | Stadium: Stroitel Stadium; Attendance: 349; Referee: Denis Scherbakov (Minsk) |

| 29 April 2020 | BATE Borisov | 2–0 (2–1 agg.) | Slavia Mozyr | Borisov |
| 20:00 | Volkov 12'; Tymonyuk 45' (o.g.) | Report | | Stadium: Borisov Arena; Attendance: 761; Referee: Sergey Stetsutin (Brest) |

== Final ==
The final was played on 24 May 2020 at Dinamo Stadium in Minsk.

24 May 2020
17:00 UTC+3

| BATE Borisov | 1–0 (a.e.t.) | Dinamo Brest |
|---|---|---|
| Volkov 120+1' | Report |

Dinamo Stadium, Minsk
Attendance: 5,700
Referee: Amin Kurgheli (Gomel)

BATE:
| GK | 35 | (Belarus) Anton Chichkan |
| RB | 4 | (Serbia) Aleksandar Filipović |
| CB | 23 | (Belarus) Zakhar Volkov |
| CB | 21 | (Belarus) Egor Filipenko | | (substituted off) 42' |
| LB | 3 | (Bosnia and Herzegovina) Bojan Nastić |
| CM | 25 | (Belarus) Dzmitry Baha | (yellow card) 93' | (substituted off) 101' |
| CM | 5 | (Belarus) Yevgeniy Yablonskiy |
| CM | 8 | (Belarus) Stanislaw Drahun |
| RW | 22 | (Belarus) Ihar Stasevich (c) |
| CF | 15 | (Belarus) Maksim Skavysh |
| LW | 33 | (Belarus) Pavel Nyakhaychyk | | (substituted off) 65' |
Substitutes:
| GK | 48 | (Belarus) Denis Scherbitskiy |
| MF | 7 | (Belarus) Yevgeniy Berezkin |
| FW | 9 | (Serbia) Bojan Dubajić |
| DF | 14 | (Montenegro) Boris Kopitović | (yellow card) 104' | (substituted on) 42' |
| MF | 18 | (Iceland) Willum Þór Willumsson | | (substituted on) 101' |
| MF | 19 | (Belarus) Dmitriy Bessmertny |
| FW | 26 | (Serbia) Nemanja Milić | | (substituted on) 65' |
Manager:
(Belarus) Kirill Alshevsky

DINAMO:
| GK | 1 | (Belarus) Syarhey Ignatovich |
| RB | 77 | (Belarus) Roman Yuzepchuk |
| CB | 22 | (Belarus) Aleksandr Pavlovets |
| CB | 2 | (Cameroon) Gaby Kiki | (yellow card) 90+2' |
| LB | 13 | (Belarus) Maksim Vitus | | (substituted off) 105' |
| CM | 15 | (Belarus) Syarhey Kislyak (c) | (yellow card) 86' |
| CM | 19 | (Ukraine) Oleksandr Noyok | (yellow card) 82' |
| RW | 88 | (Belarus) Pavel Savitski |
| LW | 62 | (Belarus) Mikhail Gordeichuk | | (substituted off) 70' |
| FW | 7 | (Belarus) Artem Bykov |
| FW | 10 | (Ukraine) Artem Milevskyi | | (substituted off) 106' |
Substitutes:
| GK | 35 | (Belarus) Pavel Pavlyuchenko |
| MF | 5 | (Belarus) Kiryl Pyachenin |
| MF | 9 | (Belarus) Sergey Krivets | | (substituted on) 106' |
| DF | 21 | (Belarus) Aleh Veratsila | | (substituted on) 105' |
| FW | 23 | (Belarus) Yevgeniy Shevchenko |
| DF | 34 | (Ukraine) Yevhen Khacheridi |
| FW | 51 | (Belarus) Dzyanis Laptsew | | (substituted on) 70' |
Manager:
(Belarus) Sergey Kovalchuk
