= 2019 Belarusian First League =

Belarusian First League
- Season: 2019
- Matches: 210
- Goals: 636 (3.03 per match)

2019 Belarusian First League is the 29th season of 2nd level football in Belarus. It started in April and ended in November 2019.

== Team changes from 2018 season ==
Two best teams of 2018 Belarusian First League (Slavia Mozyr and Energetik-BGU Minsk) were promoted to Belarusian Premier League. They were replaced by two lowest placed teams of 2018 Belarusian Premier League table (Smolevichi and Dnepr Mogilev).

Last placed team of the last season (Chist) relegated to the Second League. They were replaced by two best teams of 2018 Second League (Rukh Brest and Krumkachy Minsk), and the league was expanded to 16 teams.

Krumkachy Minsk were renamed to NFK Minsk during the winter break. In spring 2019, Dnepr Mogilev merged with Premier League team Luch Minsk, citing the willingness keep the city of Mogilev represented in top flight. The united club was named Dnyapro Mogilev. As a result, Dnepr Mogilev vacated their First League spot, and Sputnik Rechitsa (Second League 3rd-placed team) was additionally promoted.

A few days before the start of the season, UAS Zhitkovichi were denied a First League license due to debts and withdrew to the Second League, leaving the tournament one team short.

== Teams summary ==
Location of teams in 2019 Belarusian First League

Team	Location	Position in 2018
Smolevichi	Smolevichi	Premier League, 15
Belshina Bobruisk	Bobruisk	3
Lida	Lida	4
Naftan Novopolotsk	Novopolotsk	5
Lokomotiv Gomel	Gomel	6
Slonim-2017	Slonim	7
Granit Mikashevichi	Mikashevichi	8
Khimik Svetlogorsk	Svetlogorsk	9
Smorgon	Smorgon	11
Orsha	Orsha	12
Volna Pinsk	Pinsk	13
Baranovichi	Baranovichi	14
Rukh Brest	Brest	Second League, 1
NFK Minsk	Minsk	Second League, 2
Sputnik Rechitsa	Rechitsa	Second League, 3

== League table ==
Pos	Team	Pld	W	D	L	GF	GA	GD	Pts	Promotion or relegation
1	Belshina Bobruisk (P)	28	21	5	2	74	22	+52	68	Promotion to the Belarusian Premier League
2	Smolevichi (P)	28	19	7	2	60	15	+45	64	Promotion to the Belarusian Premier League
3	Rukh Brest (Q)	28	15	11	2	65	26	+39	56	Promotion to the promotion play-offs
4	Lokomotiv Gomel	28	17	5	6	60	24	+36	56	
5	Naftan Novopolotsk	28	13	8	7	58	43	+15	47	
6	Sputnik Rechitsa	28	13	6	9	46	36	+10	45	
7	Lida	28	12	8	8	49	32	+17	44	
8	NFK Minsk	28	11	7	10	41	38	+3	40	
9	Granit Mikashevichi	28	9	8	11	38	41	−3	35	
10	Orsha	28	9	4	15	33	61	−28	31	
11	Khimik Svetlogorsk	28	7	5	16	26	59	−33	26	
12	Volna Pinsk	28	5	6	17	29	48	−19	21	
13	Slonim-2017	28	4	9	15	18	47	−29	21	
14	Smorgon	28	4	6	18	27	63	−36	18	
15	Baranovichi (R)	28	2	3	23	12	80	−68	9	Relegation to the Belarusian Second League

Source: football.by
Rules for classification: 1) Points; 2) Head-to-head points; 3) Head-to-head goal difference; 4) Head-to-head goals scored; 5) Goal difference; 6) Matches won; 7) Goals scored.
(P) Promoted; (Q) Qualified for the phase indicated; (R) Relegated

== Results ==
Home \ Away	BAR	BSH	GRA	KHI	LID	LGM	NAF	NFK	ORS	RUH	SLO	SML	SMR	SPU	VOL
Baranovichi	—	0–5	2–5	1–3	0–1	0–2	1–2	0–4	0–2	0–5	2–1	0–5	0–0	0–4	1–2
Belshina Bobruisk	4–0	—	2–1	4–0	2–1	3–0	1–3	1–1	5–0	2–2	5–0	0–2	4–1	5–2	3–0
Granit Mikashevichi	1–1	1–5	—	0–0	2–1	2–0	3–4	2–2	3–1	0–5	2–0	2–2	3–1	0–0	0–0
Khimik Svetlogorsk	0–1	1–2	4–0	—	1–1	0–3	0–4	1–0	2–1	0–2	0–0	1–0	4–0	0–3	1–0
Lida	6–1	0–1	0–0	4–0	—	0–0	2–1	2–2	8–1	2–4	2–0	0–1	2–1	1–0	2–1
Lokomotiv Gomel	4–0	0–1	1–0	6–1	1–0	—	2–1	3–1	1–0	0–2	4–0	1–1	6–1	2–0	3–1
Naftan Novopolotsk	3–0	1–5	0–0	5–3	3–2	2–2	—	2–2	2–4	2–2	0–0	0–0	5–0	2–1	2–2
NFK Minsk	2–0	1–2	0–2	2–0	1–3	1–1	1–4	—	2–3	0–0	2–0	0–5	4–0	3–3	2–1
Orsha	0–0	1–4	1–0	0–0	1–2	0–2	0–3	2–1	—	1–2	1–0	1–5	3–1	0–2	0–0
Rukh Brest	2–0	1–1	1–0	8–1	1–1	3–1	2–2	0–1	6–1	—	1–1	0–3	3–0	2–2	1–0
Slonim-2017	1–0	0–1	3–1	2–1	0–2	0–5	1–2	0–1	1–3	1–1	—	0–3	0–0	1–0	2–2
Smolevichi	4–0	1–1	3–2	6–0	4–1	1–1	2–1	1–0	3–1	0–0	1–1	—	1–0	1–2	1–0
Smorgon	4–1	0–0	0–3	2–2	0–0	1–4	2–0	0–2	1–2	0–3	2–2	0–1	—	0–1	1–2
Sputnik Rechitsa	3–1	0–2	2–0	1–0	1–1	2–1	2–0	0–2	3–3	2–2	2–0	0–2	3–5	—	3–0
Volna Pinsk	5–0	2–3	0–3	1–0	2–2	0–4	1–2	0–1	2–0	2–4	1–1	0–1	2–4	0–2	—

Source: football.by
Legend: Blue = home team win; Yellow = draw; Red = away team win.

== Top goalscorers ==
Rank	Goalscorer	Team	Goals
1	(Russia) Aleksandr Yushin	Belshina Bobruisk	26
2	(Belarus) Dzmitry Ivanow	Orsha	17
3	(Belarus) Ivan Veras	Granit Mikashevichi	15
3	(Belarus) Yawhen Barsukow	Smolevichi	15
5	(Belarus) Andrey Solovey	Lokomotiv Gomel	13
6	(Belarus) Vadzim Dzemidovich	Rukh Brest	12
6	(Belarus) Andrey Lyasyuk	Belshina Bobruisk	12
6	(Belarus) Denis Kozlovskiy	Lokomotiv Gomel	12
9	(Belarus) Dmitry Gomza	Smolevichi	11
9	(Belarus) Dmitry Tamelo	Naftan Novopolotsk	11

Updated to games played on 24 November 2019
Source: football.by

== See also ==
- 2019 Belarusian Premier League
- 2018–19 Belarusian Cup
- 2019–20 Belarusian Cup
