= Slyusar =

Slyusar (Ukrainian: Слюсар) is a occupational surname of Ukrainian origin meaning "locksmith", which may refer to:

- Antonina Slyusar (born 1963), Ukrainian/Soviet sprint athlete and runner at the 1994 European Championships
- Denys Slyusar, Ukrainian footballer
- Igor Slyusar (born 1989), Ukrainian ice hockey player
- Irina Slyusar (born 1963), Ukrainian/Soviet sprint athlete and twin sister of Antonina
- Maksym Slyusar, Ukrainian footballer
- Valentyn Slyusar (born 1977), Ukrainian footballer
- Vadym Slyusar (born 1964), Ukrainian/Soviet scientist
- Yury Slyusar (born 1974), CEO of United Aircraft Corporation

== See also ==
- ru:Слюсарь, another transliteration into Russian
