= Dmitri Ivanov =

Dmitri Ivanov may refer to:

- Dmitry Ivanov (weightlifter) (1928–1993), Russian weightlifter
- Dmytro Ivanov (born 1989), Ukrainian footballer with FC Nyva Ternopil
- Dzmitry Ivanow (born 1997), Belarusian footballer with FC Vitebsk
- Dmitri Ivanov (footballer, born 1970), Russian footballer with FC Krylia Sovetov Samara, FC Torpedo Moscow, FC Rotor Volgograd, FC Uralan Elista, FC Rostov and FC Rubin Kazan
- Dmitri Ivanov (footballer, born 1987), Russian footballer with FC Rostov and FC Anzhi Makhachkala
- Dmitri Ivanov (footballer, born 1994), Russian footballer with FC Baltika Kaliningrad
- Dmitri Ivanov (footballer, born 2000), Russian footballer with FC Krasnodar
- Dmitry Alexandrovich Ivanov, Russian programmer and civil activist
- Dmitry Pavlovich Ivanov (ru), Hero of the Soviet Union
- Dmitry Trofimovich Ivanov (ru), Hero of the Soviet Union
- Dmitriy Ivanov (decathlete) (born 1977), Russian decathlete and medallist at the 1999 European Athletics U23 Championships
