= Nikita Melnikov =

Nikita Melnikov may refer to:

- Nikita Melnikov (wrestler) (born 1987), Russian wrestler
- Nikita Melnikov (footballer), Russian football player
