= Kuptsov =

Kuptsov (Russian: Купцов, from купец meaning merchant) is a Russian masculine surname, its feminine counterpart is Kuptsova. It may refer to

- Andriy Kuptsov (born 1971), Ukrainian football player
- Artyom Kuptsov (born 1984), Russian pole vaulter
- Marina Kuptsova (born 1981), Russian high jumper
- Pavel Kuptsov (born 1998), Belarusian football player
- Vasily Kuptsov (1899–1935), Russian painter
