= Anton Demkov =

Belarusian professional footballer

Personal information
- Date of birth: 15 October 1995 (age 31)
- Place of birth: Brest, Belarus
- Height: 1.75 m (5 ft 9 in)
- Position: Midfielder

Youth career
- 2012–2014: Dinamo Brest

Senior career*
Years	Team	Apps	(Gls)
2014–2016	Dinamo Brest	1	(0)
2015	→ Kobrin (loan)	23	(1)
2017	UAS Zhitkovichi	11	(3)
2018	Rukh Brest	27	(1)
2019	Ivatsevichi	26	(1)
2020	Volna Pinsk	17	(0)
2021	Brestzhilstroy	9	(1)
2022	Niva Dolbizno	2	(0)
- * Club domestic league appearances and goals as of 31 December 2022

Anton Demkov (Belarusian: Антон Дзямкоў; Russian: Антон Демков; born 6 August 1995) is a Belarusian professional footballer.
