= Kucherov =

Kucherov (Russian: Кучеров, from кучер meaning 'coachman') is a Russian masculine surname; its feminine counterpart is Kucherova. It may refer to:

- Aleksandr Kucherov (born 1995), Belarusian football player
- Nikita Kucherov (born 1993), Russian ice hockey right winger
- Pavel Kucherov (born 1964), Russian football coach
- Sergey Kucherov (born 1980), Russian track cyclist
- Stepan Kucherov (1902–1973), Soviet naval officer
- Valeriy Kucherov (born 1993), Ukrainian football player
