= Yevgeny Nikitin =

Yevgeny Nikitin may refer to:

- Yevgeny Nikitin (bass-baritone), Russian bass-baritone opera singer
- Yevgeny Nikitin (footballer) (born 1993), Belarusian football player
