= Sergey Vodyanovich =

Belarusian footballer

Personal information
- Date of birth: 2 May 1995 (age 31)
- Place of birth: Ivatsevichy, Brest Oblast, Belarus
- Height: 1.75 m (5 ft 9 in)
- Position: Midfielder

Team information
- Current team: Ivatsevichi
- Number: 7

Youth career
- 2012–2013: Belshina Bobruisk

Senior career*
Years	Team	Apps	(Gls)
2014–2015	Belshina Bobruisk	11	(0)
2016	Dinamo Brest	5	(0)
2016–2017	Belshina Bobruisk	33	(0)
2018–2022	Volna Pinsk	108	(2)
2023–	Ivatsevichi	15	(5)

International career
2011–2012	Belarus U17	6	(1)
- * Club domestic league appearances and goals as of 31 December 2023

Sergey Vodyanovich (Belarusian: Сяргей Вадзяновіч; Russian: Сергей Водянович; born 2 May 1995) is a Belarusian professional footballer who is currently playing for Ivatsevichi.

== Honours ==
Dinamo Brest

- Belarusian Cup winner: 2016–17
