= Aleksandr Kholodinsky =

Belarusian footballer

Personal information
- Date of birth: 16 October 1991 (age 35)
- Place of birth: Kolodischi, Minsk Raion, Belarusian SSR
- Height: 1.73 m (5 ft 8 in)
- Position: Midfielder

Youth career
- MTZ-RIPO Minsk

Senior career*
Years	Team	Apps	(Gls)
2009	Gorodeya	1	(0)
2012–2020	Isloch Minsk Raion	206	(25)
2019	→ Underdog Chist (loan)	14	(6)
2020–2021	Sputnik Rechitsa	20	(4)
2021	Shakhtyor Petrikov	7	(1)
2022	Molodechno	0	(0)
- * Club domestic league appearances and goals as of 31 December 2022

Aleksandr Kholodinsky (Belarusian: Аляксандр Халадзінскі; Russian: Александр Холодинский; born 16 October 1991) is a Belarusian former professional footballer.
