= Petr Zyl =

Belarusian footballer

Personal information
- Date of birth: 7 April 1994 (age 32)
- Place of birth: Minsk, Belarus
- Position: Defender

Team information
- Current team: Viktoriya Maryina Gorka

Youth career
- 2010: RUOR Minsk
- 2011–2012: Dinamo Minsk

Senior career*
Years	Team	Apps	(Gls)
2011–2016	Dinamo Minsk	0	(0)
2011–2012	→ Dinamo-2 Minsk	39	(2)
2012–2015	→ Bereza-2010 (loan)	79	(1)
2016	→ Zvezda-BGU Minsk (loan)	12	(0)
2016	→ Dnepr Mogilev (loan)	10	(0)
2017	Dnepr Mogilev	4	(0)
2017	→ Lida (loan)	13	(0)
2018	Lida	22	(2)
2019	Oshmyany	7	(0)
2022–	Viktoriya Maryina Gorka	39	(15)

International career
2010–2011	Belarus U17		
2012	Belarus U19		
- * Club domestic league appearances and goals as of 31 December 2023

Petr Zyl (Belarusian: Пётр Зыль; Russian: Пётр Зыль; born 7 April 1994) is a Belarusian professional footballer who plays for Viktoriya Maryina Gorka.

On 6 August 2020, the BFF banned Zyl from Belarusian football for 2 years for his involvement in the match fixing.
