= Fanipol railway station =

Railway station in Fanipol, Belarus

Coordinates: 53°44′40″N 27°20′10″E

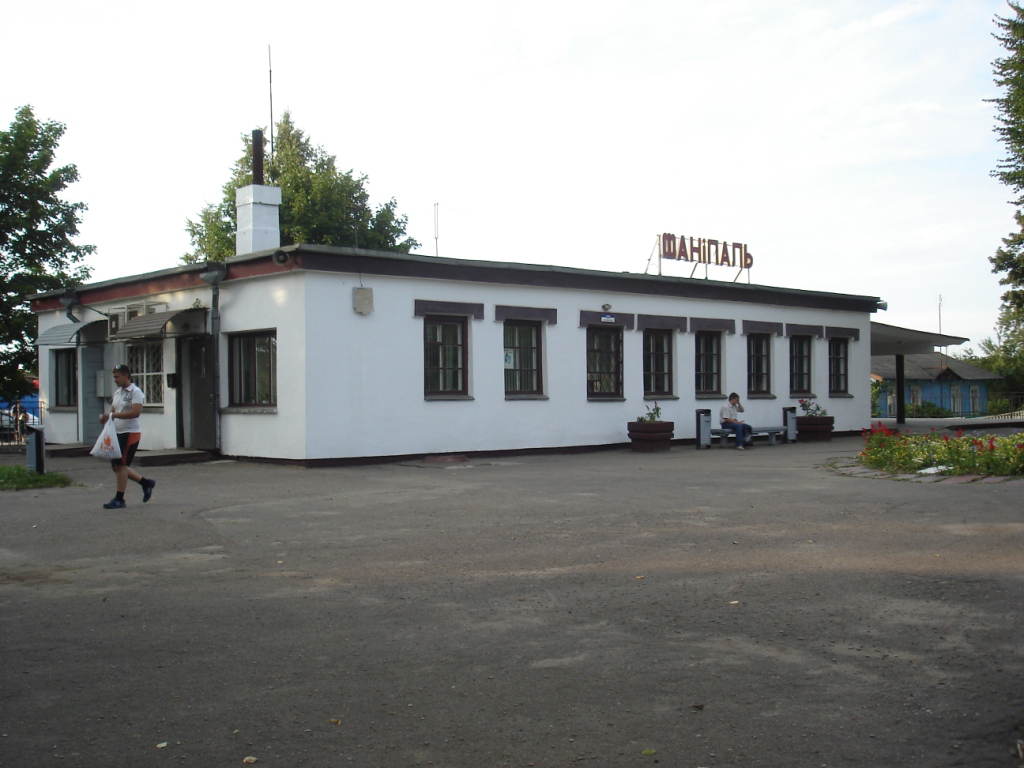

Fa'nipol railway station (Belarusian: Фа'ніпальскі вакза'л Russian: Фа'нипольский вокза'л) is a railway station in Fanipol, Belarus.

== History ==
The station was built in 1870 as a stopping point. Then, in 1871, the stopping point become To'karevskaya station, named in honor of A. Tokarev, governor of Minsk Province and founder of the Brest-Moscow railroad. On August 9, 1876, the railway station began to be called "Fanipol". As of 2008, about 150 freight and passenger trains pass through the Fanipol railway station every day.
