= Anton Novik =

Belarusian footballer

Personal information
- Date of birth: 23 July 1998 (age 28)
- Place of birth: Zhdanovichy, Minsk Raion, Belarus
- Height: 1.76 m (5 ft 9 in)
- Position: Midfielder

Team information
- Current team: Viktoriya Maryina Gorka

Youth career
- 2015–2017: Minsk

Senior career*
| Years | Team | Apps | (Gls) |
| 2017–2019 | Minsk | 4 | (0) |
| 2018 | → UAS Zhitkovichi (loan) | 22 | (3) |
| 2019 | Naftan Novopolotsk | 3 | (0) |
| 2020 | Belshina Bobruisk | 2 | (0) |
| 2020 | Smorgon | 11 | (0) |
| 2021– | Viktoriya Maryina Gorka | 53 | (27) |

International career
| 2018 | Belarus U21 | 2 | (0) |
- * Club domestic league appearances and goals as of 31 December 2023

Anton Novik (Belarusian: Антон Новік; Russian: Антон Новик; born 23 July 1998) is a Belarusian professional footballer who plays for Viktoriya Maryina Gorka.
