= Antonio Siyaka =

Belarusian footballer

Personal information
- Date of birth: 27 January 1996 (age 30)
- Place of birth: Mogilev, Belarus
- Position: Midfielder

Team information
- Current team: Veles-2020 Vitebsk

Youth career
- 2012–2014: Dnepr Mogilev

Senior career*
Years	Team	Apps	(Gls)
2012	Dnepr-2 Mogilev	13	(0)
2014–2016	Dnepr Mogilev	26	(0)
2016	→ Granit Mikashevichi (loan)	6	(0)
2017	Molodechno-DYuSSh-4	9	(0)
2018–2019	Gorki	35	(6)
2019–2021	Orsha	31	(2)
2021	Gorki	7	(1)
2022–	Veles-2020 Vitebsk	14	(0)

International career^{‡}
2013	Belarus U17	2	(0)
- * Club domestic league appearances and goals as of 31 December 2022 ‡ National team caps and goals as of 25 July 2014

Antonio Siyaka (Belarusian: Антоніё Сіяка; Russian: Антонио Сийака; born 27 January 1996) is a Belarusian footballer playing currently for Veles-2020 Vitebsk.
