= Ruslan Kapantsow =

Belarusian footballer

Personal information
- Date of birth: 12 May 1981 (age 45)
- Place of birth: Mogilev, Belarusian SSR, Soviet Union
- Height: 1.91 m (6 ft 3 in)
- Position: Goalkeeper

Team information
- Current team: Gorki

Youth career
- 1999–2000: Dnepr-Transmash Mogilev

Senior career*
Years	Team	Apps	(Gls)
1999–2002	Dnepr-Transmash Mogilev	42	(0)
1999	→ Dnepr-2 Mogilev	5	(0)
1999	→ Veino-Dnepr	14	(0)
2003	Dinamo Minsk	10	(0)
2004	Belshina Bobruisk	11	(0)
2005–2010	Dnepr Mogilev	101	(0)
2011–2012	Belshina Bobruisk	39	(0)
2013	Volna Pinsk	6	(0)
2014	Shakhtyor Soligorsk	0	(0)
2015–2017	Dnepr Mogilev	29	(0)
2018	Belshina Bobruisk	14	(0)
2019–	Gorki	92	(0)

International career
2002–2003	Belarus U21	3	(0)
- * Club domestic league appearances and goals as of 31 December 2023

Ruslan Anatolevich Kapantsow (Belarusian: Руслан Анатолевіч Капанцоў; Russian: Руслан Копанцов (Ruslan Kopantsov); born 12 May 1981) is a Belarusian professional footballer who plays for Gorki.

== Honours ==
Dinamo Minsk

- Belarusian Cup winner: 2002–03

Shakhtyor Soligorsk

- Belarusian Cup winner: 2013–14
