= Yawhen Kisyalyow =

Belarusian footballer

Personal information
- Date of birth: 27 February 1993 (age 33)
- Place of birth: Bobruisk, Mogilev Oblast, Belarus
- Height: 1.81 m (5 ft 11 1/2 in)
- Position: Defender

Team information
- Current team: Gorki
- Number: 18

Youth career
- 2010–2013: Belshina Bobruisk

Senior career*
Years	Team	Apps	(Gls)
2013–2016	Belshina Bobruisk	7	(0)
2014	→ Khimik Svetlogorsk (loan)	14	(0)
2015	→ Orsha (loan)	13	(0)
2015–2016	→ Khimik Svetlogorsk (loan)	25	(1)
2018–	Gorki	90	(3)
- * Club domestic league appearances and goals as of 31 December 2023

Yawhen Kisyalyow (Belarusian: Яўген Кісялёў; Russian: Евгений Киселев; born 27 February 1993) is a Belarusian professional footballer who is currently playing for Gorki.
