= 2024–25 FC Ufa season =

FC Ufa
2024–25 season
- Manager: Yevgeni Kharlachyov
- Stadium: Neftyanik Stadium
- Russian First League: 15th
- Russian Cup: Pre-season

The 2024–25 season is the 16th season in the history of FC Ufa, and the club's first season back in the Russian First League. In addition to the domestic league, the team is scheduled to participate in the Russian Cup.

== Transfers ==
=== In ===
Pos.	Player	Transferred from	Fee	Date	Source
FW	(Belarus) Vladislav Lozhkin	(Belarus) Slavia Mozyr	Free	19 July 2024	

== Friendlies ==
=== Pre-season ===
30 June 2024 Friendly	Alania Vladikavkaz (Russia)	0–0	(Russia) FC Ufa
12:30			(penalty missed) 58'
Note: 2 x 40 minutes.

3 July 2024 Friendly	Spartak Kostroma (Russia)	0–4	(Russia) FC Ufa
10:40

7 July 2024 Friendly	Spartak Moscow (Russia)	1–0	(Russia) FC Ufa
18:30	Meleshin 15'			Attendance: 0
Note: 2 x 35 minutes

== Competitions ==
=== Overall record ===
Competition	First match	Last match	Starting round	Record							
Competition	First match	Last match	Starting round	Pld	W	D	L	GF	GA	GD	Win %
Russian First League	15 July 2024		Matchday 1	5	0	3	2	4	7	−3	0.00
Russian Cup				0	0	0	0	0	0	+0	—
Total				5	0	3	2	4	7	−3	0.00

Last updated: 12 August 2024
Source: Soccerway

=== Russian First League ===
==== League table ====
Pos	Team	Pld	W	D	L	GF	GA	GD	Pts	Promotion, qualification or relegation
13	Chayka Peschanokopskoye	34	8	14	12	31	43	−12	38 (Note: Ranked on head-to-head points (KAMAZ 6, Neftekhimik 5, Chayka 4))	
14	Shinnik Yaroslavl	34	8	11	15	24	42	−18	35 (Note: Ranked on head-to-head goal difference (Shinnik +1, Ufa –1))	
15	Ufa	34	9	8	17	32	48	−16	35	
16	Sokol Saratov (Note: Sokol was not relegated despite finishing in the relegation spot, as Khimki which was administratively relegated from Premier League to the First League was later dissolved, with Sokol replacing them in the First League)	34	7	11	16	25	41	−16	32	
17	Alania Vladikavkaz (R)	34	6	9	19	24	50	−26	27 (Note: Ranked on head-to-head points (Alania 4, Tyumen 1))	Relegation to Second League

Source: Soccerway
Rules for classification: 1) Points; 2) Head-to-head points; 3) Head-to-head matches won; 4) Head-to-head goal difference; 5) Head-to-head goals scored; 6) Head-to-head away goals scored; 7) Matches won; 8) Goal difference; 9) Goals scored; 10) Away matches won; 11) Away goals scored; 12) Best disciplinary record (3 points for red card, 1 point for yellow card); 13) Drawing lots. If teams tied on points did not play an equal number of head-to-head games, head-to-head criteria and disciplinary record are not used for positioning. If 1st- and 2nd-placed teams are tied in the final standings on the first 12 criteria, a winner is determined in an additional play-off game, with no extra time and a penalty-shootout if tied at the end of regulation, instead of drawing lots.
(R) Relegated

==== Results summary ====
Overall								Home						Away					
Pld	W	D	L	GF	GA	GD	Pts	W	D	L	GF	GA	GD	W	D	L	GF	GA	GD
5	0	3	2	4	7	−3	3	0	1	1	2	4	−2	0	2	1	2	3	−1

Last updated: 12 August 2024.

==== Results by round ====
Round	1	2	3	4	5
Ground	A	A	A	H	H
Result	D	L	D	D	L
Position	9	12	15		

Updated to match(es) played on 12 August 2024. Source:
A = Away; H = Home; W = Win; D = Draw; L = Loss

==== Matches ====
The tentative match schedule was released on 27 June.

15 July 2024 1	Alania Vladikavkaz	0–0	Ufa	Grozny
19:30 UTC+3				Stadium: Akhmat-Arena; Attendance: 365; Referee: Igor Panin

21 July 2024 2	Neftekhimik Nizhnekamsk	2–1	Ufa	Nizhnekamsk
18:00 UTC+3	Aliyev 79'; Shorkin 88'		Pasevich 10'; Kutin (red card) 59'	Stadium: Neftekhimik Stadium; Attendance: 1,451; Referee: Anton Anopa

26 July 2024 3	Baltika Kaliningrad	1–1	Ufa	Kaliningrad
20:15 UTC+3	Pryakhin 56'		Gurenko 35'	Stadium: Kaliningrad Stadium; Attendance: 10,755; Referee: Aleksandr Mashlyakevich

2 August 2024 4	Ufa	2–2	Tyumen	Ufa
17:30 UTC+3	Ageyan 42'; Kutin 65'		Kuptsov 2'; Voropayev 18'; Shavlokhov (red card) 36'	Stadium: Neftyanik Stadium

12 August 2024 5	Ufa	0–2	Ural Yekaterinburg	Ufa
			Voronov 33'; Ionov 78'	Stadium: Neftyanik Stadium
