= Roman Pasevich =

Belarusian footballer

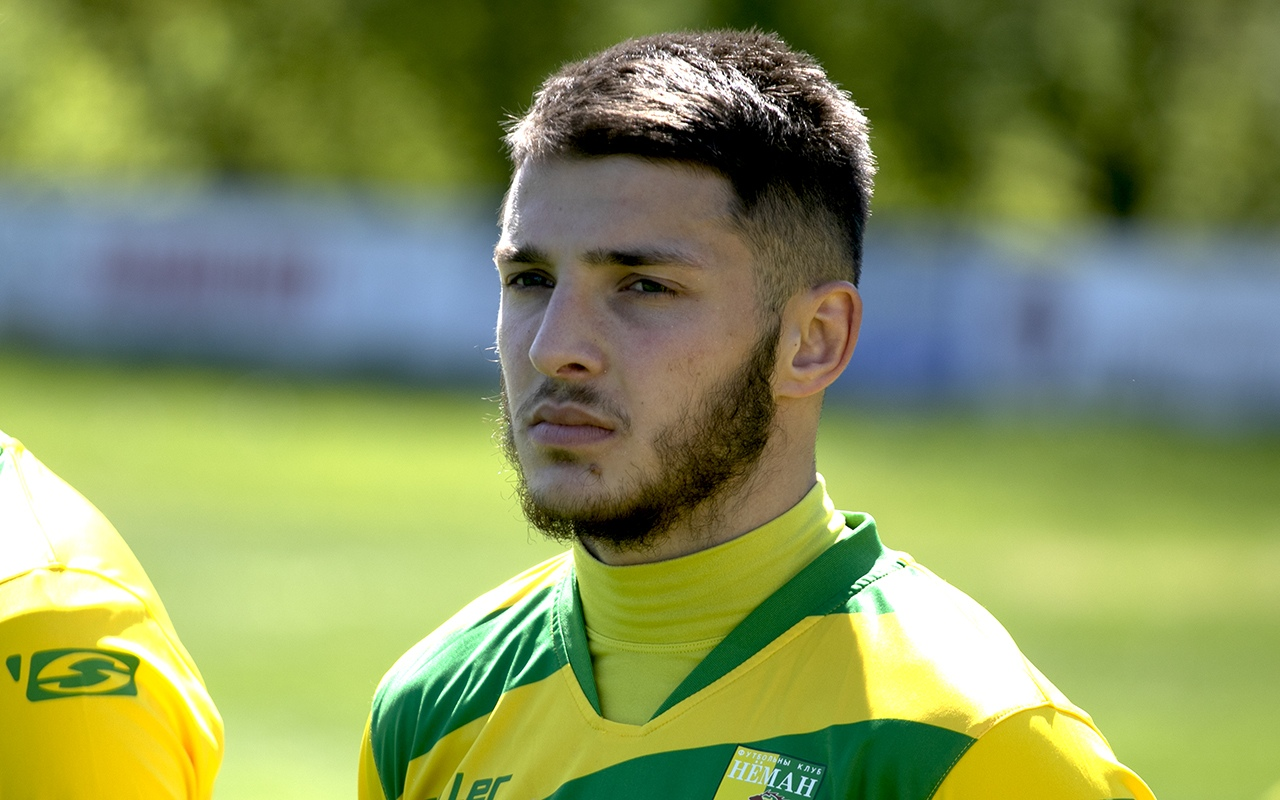
- Pasevich for Neman Grodno in 2020

Personal information
- Full name: Roman Vladimirovich Pasevich
- Date of birth: 28 November 1999 (age 26)
- Place of birth: Vidzy, Vitebsk Oblast, Belarus
- Height: 1.69 m (5 ft 7 in)
- Position: Midfielder

Team information
- Current team: Sochi
- Number: 97

Youth career
- 2015–2016: PMC Postavy
- 2017: Isloch Minsk Raion

Senior career*
Years	Team	Apps	(Gls)
2016–2017	PMC Postavy	25	(8)
2018	Osipovichi	11	(9)
2018	Sputnik Rechitsa	14	(7)
2019	Lida	28	(4)
2020–2023	Neman Grodno	45	(1)
2021	→ Smorgon (loan)	13	(5)
2023–2025	Ufa	56	(9)
2025–	Sochi	13	(1)
2025–2026	→ Mura (loan)	8	(1)
2026	→ Sokol Saratov (loan)	13	(0)

International career^{‡}
2025–	Belarus	1	(0)
- * Club domestic league appearances and goals as of 16 May 2026 ‡ National team caps and goals as of 5 September 2025

Roman Vladimirovich Pasevich (Belarusian: Пасевич Роман Владимирович; Russian: Роман Пасевич; born 28 November 1999) is a Belarusian professional footballer who plays for Russian club Sochi and the Belarus national team.

== Club career ==
On 12 August 2025, Pasevich moved on loan to Mura in Slovenia.

== Career statistics ==
As of 31 May 2025

Club	Season	League			Cup		Continental		Other		Total	
Club	Season	Division	Apps	Goals	Apps	Goals	Apps	Goals	Apps	Goals	Apps	Goals
Osipovichi	2018	Belarusian Second League	11	9	1	1	–		–		12	10
Lida	2019	Belarusian First League	28	4	2	2	–		–		30	6
Neman Grodno	2020	Belarusian Premier League	4	0	1	0	–		–		5	0
Neman Grodno	2021	Belarusian Premier League	11	0	2	0	–		–		13	0
Neman Grodno	2022	Belarusian Premier League	30	1	6	0	–		–		36	1
Neman Grodno	Total		45	1	9	0	0	0	0	0	54	1
Smorgon (loan)	2021	Belarusian Premier League	13	5	0	0	–		–		13	5
Ufa	2023–24	Russian Second League A	35	8	3	0	–		–		38	8
Ufa	2024–25	Russian First League	21	1	2	0	–		–		23	1
Ufa	Total		56	9	5	0	0	0	0	0	61	9
Sochi	2024–25	Russian First League	13	1	0	0	–		2 (Note: Appearances in promotion play-offs)	1	15	2
Career total			166	29	17	3	0	0	2	1	185	33
