= Aleksey Belevich =

Belarusian footballer (born 1995)

Personal information
- Date of birth: 26 January 1995 (age 31)
- Place of birth: Grodno, Belarus
- Height: 1.85 m (6 ft 1 in)
- Position: Midfielder

Team information
- Current team: Ostrovets
- Number: 62

Youth career
- 2010–2013: Dinamo Minsk

Senior career*
| Years | Team | Apps | (Gls) |
| 2013–2015 | Dinamo Minsk | 0 | (0) |
| 2013 | → Minsk (loan) | 0 | (0) |
| 2014–2015 | → Bereza-2010 (loan) | 44 | (4) |
| 2016 | Torpedo-BelAZ Zhodino | 5 | (0) |
| 2017 | Granit Mikashevichi | 6 | (0) |
| 2017 | Baranovichi | 7 | (0) |
| 2018 | Chist | 14 | (5) |
| 2018 | Naftan Novopolotsk | 11 | (1) |
| 2019 | Underdog Chist | 25 | (4) |
| 2020– | Ostrovets | 72 | (15) |

International career
| 2010 | Belarus U17 | | |
| 2013 | Belarus U19 | | |
- * Club domestic league appearances and goals as of 31 December 2023

Aleksey Belevich (Belarusian: Аляксей Бялевіч; Russian: Алексей Белевич; born 26 January 1995) is a Belarusian professional footballer who plays for Ostrovets.

== Career ==
He made his professional debut in 2013, playing for FC Minsk against St Johnstone in UEFA Europa League match.
