= Dmitri Vavilov =

Russian footballer

Personal information
- Full name: Dmitri Vladimirovich Vavilov
- Date of birth: 2 February 1986 (age 40)
- Height: 1.80 m (5 ft 11 in)
- Position: Defender

Youth career
- 2003–2005: Lada Togliatti

Senior career*
Years	Team	Apps	(Gls)
2004	Lada Togliatti	1	(0)
2005	Dynamo Kirov	21	(0)
2006	Lada Togliatti	7	(0)
2006	Energetik Uren	7	(0)
2009	Kyzylzhar	12	(0)
2010–2013	Mashuk-KMV Pyatigorsk	91	(7)
2014	Lada Togliatti	4	(0)
2014–2015	FC Sergiyevsk		
2019–2021	Uzda	16	(2)
2022	Yuni Minsk	4	(2)
2023	Viktoryja Marjina Horka	19	(5)
2024	Yuni Minsk		
- * Club domestic league appearances and goals

Dmitri Vladimirovich Vavilov (Russian: Дмитрий Владимирович Вавилов; born 2 February 1986) is a Russian former professional football player.

== Club career ==
He played in the Russian Football National League for FC Lada Togliatti in 2006.
