= Sergey Duboyenko =

Belarusian footballer

Personal information
- Date of birth: 27 June 1986 (age 40)
- Place of birth: Minsk, Belarusian SSR
- Height: 1.78 m (5 ft 10 in)
- Position: Midfielder

Team information
- Current team: Viktoriya Maryina Gorka (manager)

Youth career
- 2003–2005: Zvezda-BGU Minsk

Senior career*
| Years | Team | Apps | (Gls) |
| 2005–2007 | Zvezda-BGU Minsk | 42 | (1) |
| 2008 | Darida Minsk Raion | 25 | (0) |
| 2009 | Naftan Novopolotsk | 0 | (0) |
| 2010 | Veras Nesvizh | 15 | (0) |
| 2011–2013 | Slavia Mozyr | 49 | (1) |
| 2020–2022 | Viktoriya Maryina Gorka | 26 | (2) |

Managerial career
- 2021–: Viktoriya Maryina Gorka
- * Club domestic league appearances and goals as of 31 December 2022

Sergey Duboyenko (Belarusian: Сяргей Дубоенка; Russian: Серге́й Дубоенко; born 27 June 1986) is a Belarusian football coach and former player.
