= Yegor Pitsyk =

Belarusian footballer

Personal information
- Date of birth: 1 February 1995 (age 31)
- Place of birth: Brest, Belarus
- Height: 1.83 m (6 ft 0 in)
- Position: Midfielder

Youth career
- 2013–2014: Dinamo Brest

Senior career*
Years	Team	Apps	(Gls)
2014–2015	Dinamo Brest	6	(0)
2015	→ Kobrin (loan)	13	(0)
2016	→ Baranovichi (loan)	9	(0)
2017	Granit Mikashevichi	10	(1)
2018	GKS Wikielec	5	(0)
2018	Volna Pinsk	7	(1)
2018	Smorgon	14	(0)
2019	Ivatsevichi	22	(12)
2020	Granit Mikashevichi	1	(0)
2020	Ivatsevichi	6	(0)
2021	Brestzhilstroy	10	(18)
2022	Ossa Biskupiec		
- * Club domestic league appearances and goals

Yegor Pitsyk (Belarusian: Ягор Піцык; Russian: Егор Пицык; born 1 February 1995) is a Belarusian former professional footballer who played as a midfielder.
