= Arseniy Bondarenko =

Belarusian professional footballer

Personal information
- Date of birth: 9 October 1995 (age 31)
- Place of birth: Minsk, Belarus
- Height: 1.85 m (6 ft 1 in)
- Position: Defender

Team information
- Current team: Limanovia Limanowa

Youth career
- 2012–2014: Dinamo Minsk

Senior career*
Years	Team	Apps	(Gls)
2015–2018	Dinamo Minsk	0	(0)
2015	→ Bereza-2010 (loan)	27	(1)
2016	→ Zvezda-BGU Minsk (loan)	22	(1)
2017–2018	→ Luch Minsk (loan)	44	(4)
2018	Luch Minsk	9	(0)
2019	Dnyapro Mogilev	28	(1)
2020	Torpedo-BelAZ Zhodino	0	(0)
2020	→ Smolevichi (loan)	10	(0)
2020	→ Gomel (loan)	12	(2)
2021	Smorgon	9	(2)
2021–	Limanovia Limanowa		

International career
2016	Belarus U21	1	(0)
- * Club domestic league appearances and goals as of 31 July 2021

Arseniy Bondarenko (Belarusian: Арсеній Бандарэнка; Russian: Арсений Бондаренко; born 9 October 1995) is a Belarusian professional footballer. As of 2021, he played for Limanovia Limanowa.
