= Aleksandr Tarasenya =

Belarusian footballer

Personal information
- Date of birth: 25 September 1996 (age 30)
- Place of birth: Lyakhavichy, Brest Oblast
- Position: Forward

Team information
- Current team: Ivatsevichi

Youth career
- 2015–2016: Granit Mikashevichi

Senior career*
Years	Team	Apps	(Gls)
2016–2017	Granit Mikashevichi	5	(0)
2020–	Ivatsevichi	64	(57)
- * Club domestic league appearances and goals as of 31 December 2023

Aleksandr Tarasenya (Belarusian: Аляксандр Тарасеня; Russian: Александр Тарасеня; born 25 September 1996) is a Belarusian professional footballer who plays for Ivatsevichi.
