= Syarhey Novik =

Belarusian footballer

Siarhey Novik
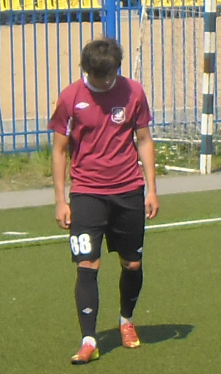
- Novik at a match in 2014.

Personal information
- Date of birth: 10 May 1993 (age 33)
- Place of birth: Zhdanovichy, Minsk Raion, Belarus
- Height: 1.78 m (5 ft 10 in)
- Position: Midfielder

Team information
- Current team: Ostrovets
- Number: 10

Youth career
- Minsk

Senior career*
Years	Team	Apps	(Gls)
2010–2013	Dinamo Minsk	0	(0)
2012	→ Bereza-2010 (loan)	22	(4)
2013	→ Slavia Mozyr (loan)	8	(0)
2013	→ Naftan Novopolotsk (loan)	1	(0)
2014	Vitebsk	12	(2)
2015	Smolevichi-STI	9	(0)
2017	Baranovichi	22	(1)
2018	UAS Zhitkovichi	21	(1)
2019	Underdog Chist	14	(4)
2019	Molodechno	9	(5)
2020	Baranovichi	18	(8)
2021–	Ostrovets	41	(22)

International career
2012–2013	Belarus U21	16	(2)
- * Club domestic league appearances and goals as of 31 December 2023

Siarhey Novik (Belarusian: Сяргей Новiк; Russian: Серге́й Новик; born 10 May 1993) is a Belarusian footballer playing currently for Ostrovets.
