= Roman Kozel =

Belarusian footballer

Personal information
- Date of birth: 7 February 1997 (age 29)
- Place of birth: Brest, Belarus
- Height: 1.77 m (5 ft 10 in)
- Position: Defender

Team information
- Current team: Niva Dolbizno
- Number: 88

Youth career
- 2013–2016: Dinamo Brest

Senior career*
| Years | Team | Apps | (Gls) |
| 2017 | Slonim-2017 | 15 | (3) |
| 2017 | Krumkachy Minsk | 12 | (0) |
| 2018 | Belshina Bobruisk | 24 | (0) |
| 2019 | Rukh Brest | 2 | (0) |
| 2019 | Granit Mikashevichi | 14 | (2) |
| 2020 | Dinamo Malorita | 21 | (4) |
| 2021 | Slonim-2017 | 27 | (3) |
| 2022– | Niva Dolbizno | 112 | (9) |

International career
| 2017 | Belarus U21 | 1 | (0) |
- * Club domestic league appearances and goals as of 6 July 2026

Roman Kozel (Belarusian: Раман Козел; Russian: Роман Козел; born 7 February 1997) is a Belarusian professional footballer who plays for Niva Dolbizno.
