= Uladzimir Khilkevich =

Belarusian footballer

Personal information
- Date of birth: 31 October 1987 (age 39)
- Place of birth: Mogilev, Belarusian SSR, Soviet Union
- Height: 1.78 m (5 ft 10 in)
- Position: Midfielder

Team information
- Current team: Gorki

Senior career*
Years	Team	Apps	(Gls)
2006–2008	Savit Mogilev	35	(2)
2007	→ Spartak Shklov (loan)	29	(2)
2009	Naftan Novopolotsk	0	(0)
2010–2013	Slavia Mozyr	120	(8)
2014–2015	Belshina Bobruisk	37	(1)
2016	Dnepr Mogilev	26	(2)
2017	Orsha	27	(1)
2018–	Gorki	120	(13)
- * Club domestic league appearances and goals as of 31 December 2023

Uladzimir Khilkevich (Belarusian: Уладзімір Хількевіч; Russian: Владимир Хилькевич; born 31 October 1987) is a Belarusian professional footballer who plays for Gorki.
