= Syarhey Kandratsyew =

Belarusian footballer

Personal information
- Date of birth: 2 February 1990 (age 36)
- Place of birth: Minsk, Belarusian SSR, Soviet Union
- Height: 1.77 m (5 ft 9 1/2 in)
- Position: Defender

Youth career
- 2006–2007: Minsk

Senior career*
Years	Team	Apps	(Gls)
2007	Minsk-2	8	(0)
2008–2012	Dinamo Minsk	36	(0)
2013	Gomel	26	(0)
2014–2015	Dinamo Brest	47	(0)
2016	Naftan Novopolotsk	27	(0)
2017–2018	Belshina Bobruisk	46	(0)
2022	Veles-2020 Vitebsk	4	(0)

International career
2006–2007	Belarus U17	5	(0)
2009	Belarus U19	6	(1)
2011–2012	Belarus U21	11	(0)
- * Club domestic league appearances and goals as of 31 December 2022

Syarhey Alyaksandravich Kandratsyew (Belarusian: Сяргей Аляксандравіч Кандрацьеў; Russian: Сергей Александрович Кондратьев, romanized: Sergey Aleksandrovich Kondratiev; born 2 February 1990) is a Belarusian former professional football player.
