= Oleksandr Safonov =

Ukrainian footballer (born 1991)

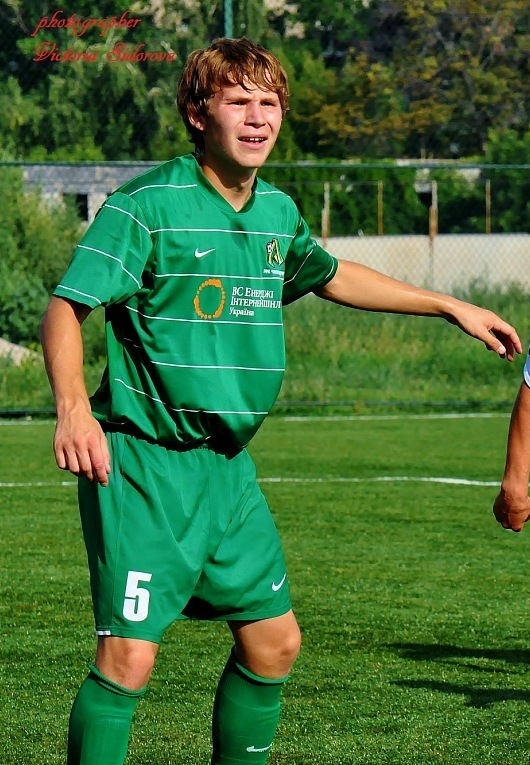
- Oleksandr Safonov, PFC Oleksandriya, 2011

Personal information
- Full name: Oleksandr Oleksandrovych Safonov
- Date of birth: 17 December 1991 (age 34)
- Place of birth: Znamianka, Kirovohrad Oblast, Ukraine
- Height: 1.83 m (6 ft 0 in)
- Position: Defensive midfielder

Team information
- Current team: Bischofshofen
- Number: 29

Youth career
- 2002–2004: Olimpik Kirovohrad
- 2007–2008: Ametyst Oleksandriya

Senior career*
Years	Team	Apps	(Gls)
2008–2011	Ametyst Oleksandriya	39	(11)
2011	Oleksandriya	0	(0)
2012–2013	Burevisnyk Petrove	42	(13)
2014	Inhulets Petrove	12	(5)
2015–2016	Cherkaskyi Dnipro	33	(3)
2016	Mykolaiv	6	(0)
2016–2017	Nova Politsiya Kropyvnytskyi	6	(6)
2017	Slutsk	28	(3)
2018	Volyn Lutsk	11	(0)
2018	Cherkashchyna-Akademiya	13	(1)
2019	Kremin Kremenchuk	18	(5)
2020–2022	LNZ Cherkasy	39	(1)
2022–	Bischofshofen	103	(11)
- * Club domestic league appearances and goals as of 27 June 2026

Oleksandr Safonov (Ukrainian: Олександр Олександрович Сафонов; born 17 December 1991) is a Ukrainian professional footballer who plays for Bischofshofen.

== Career ==
He is the product of Youth Sportive Schools of FC Olimpik Kirovohrad and FC Ametyst Oleksandria.

Safonov played in the Ukrainian amateur and lower Leagues clubs and in February 2017 signed contract with Belarusian FC Slutsk.
