= Oleg Chmyrikov =

Belarusian professional footballer

Personal information
- Full name: Oleg Chmyrikov
- Date of birth: 8 February 1996 (age 30)
- Place of birth: Mogilev, Belarus
- Height: 1.82 m (5 ft 11 1/2 in)
- Position: Defender

Youth career
- 2012–2015: Dnepr Mogilev

Senior career*
Years	Team	Apps	(Gls)
2015–2018	Gomel	40	(1)
2017	→ Belshina Bobruisk (loan)	15	(1)
2018	→ Dnepr Mogilev (loan)	13	(0)
2019	Slutsk	5	(0)
2019	Khimik Svetlogorsk	12	(0)
2020–2021	Dnepr Mogilev	42	(2)

International career^{‡}
2012–2013	Belarus U17	4	(0)
2014	Belarus U19	1	(0)
2017	Belarus U21	2	(0)
- * Club domestic league appearances and goals as of 23:49, 13 December 2021 (UTC) ‡ National team caps and goals as of 1 June 2017

Oleg Chmyrikov (Belarusian: Алег Чмырыкаў; Russian: Олег Чмыриков; born 8 February 1996) is a Belarusian professional footballer.

On 2 December 2021, Chmyrikov was fined and banned from Belarusian football for one year for involvement in match-fixing and betting.
