= Evans Adomako =

Ghanaian professional footballer

Personal information
- Full name: Evans Adomako Wiredu
- Date of birth: 6 September 1997 (age 29)
- Place of birth: Ghana
- Height: 1.79 m (5 ft 10 1/2 in)
- Position: Forward

Team information
- Current team: Karela United

Senior career*
Years	Team	Apps	(Gls)
2016–2018	Phar Rangers		
2017	→ Gomel (loan)	18	(1)
2018–2019	Rudar Velenje	0	(0)
2019	→ Dravograd (loan)	8	(5)
2019	Dravograd	11	(3)
2020	Phar Rangers		
2020–2023	Asante Kotoko	20	(1)
2022–2023	→ Karela United (loan)		
2023–	Karela United		
- * Club domestic league appearances and goals as of 31 July 2022

Evans Adomako (born 6 September 1997) is a Ghanaian professional footballer who plays for Karela United.

== Career ==
In 2017 he played for Gomel.
