= Dmitri Ivanov (footballer, born 1994) =

Russian footballer

Personal information
- Full name: Dmitri Yaroslavich Ivanov
- Date of birth: 7 June 1994 (age 32)
- Height: 1.83 m (6 ft 0 in)
- Position: Defender

Youth career
- SDYuSShOR-5 Yunost Kaliningrad

Senior career*
Years	Team	Apps	(Gls)
2013–2014	FC Baltika Kaliningrad	1	(0)
2015	Rominta Gołdap	9	(0)
- * Club domestic league appearances and goals

Dmitri Yaroslavich Ivanov (Russian: Дмитрий Ярославич Иванов; born 7 June 1994) is a Russian former football defender.

He made his debut in the Russian Football National League for FC Baltika Kaliningrad on 25 May 2013 in a game against FC Torpedo Moscow.
