= Abdulaziz Laval =

Nigerian footballer

Personal information
- Full name: Abdulaziz Lawal Abidemi
- Date of birth: 20 December 1992 (age 33)
- Place of birth: Nigeria
- Position: Midfielder

Team information
- Current team: Polotsk

Youth career
- 2011–2015: Naftan Novopolotsk

Senior career*
Years	Team	Apps	(Gls)
2015–2022	Naftan Novopolotsk	181	(7)
2023	Orsha	31	(1)
2024–2025	Molodechno	38	(1)
2025	Orsha	13	(0)
2026–	Polotsk	0	(0)
- * Club domestic league appearances and goals as of 8 April 2026

Abdulaziz Laval (born 20 December 1992) is a Nigerian footballer playing currently for Polotsk.
