= Alyaksandr Katlyaraw =

Belarusian footballer

Personal information
- Date of birth: 30 January 1993 (age 33)
- Place of birth: Gomel, Belarus
- Height: 1.74 m (5 ft 8 1/2 in)
- Position: Midfielder

Team information
- Current team: Molodechno
- Number: 23

Youth career
- 2008–2010: Gomel

Senior career*
Years	Team	Apps	(Gls)
2010–2013	Gomel	0	(0)
2010	→ Gomel-2	26	(0)
2013	→ Vedrich-97 Rechitsa (loan)	27	(5)
2014–2017	Slavia Mozyr	99	(14)
2018–2019	Torpedo-BelAZ Zhodino	31	(3)
2019	Jelgava	4	(0)
2020–2021	Slavia Mozyr	19	(1)
2021	Krumkachy Minsk	18	(4)
2025	Baranovichi	11	(0)
2025	Kyrgyzaltyn	6	(0)
2026	Ostrovets	9	(1)
2026–	Molodechno	8	(0)

International career^{‡}
2017	Belarus B	1	(0)
- * Club domestic league appearances and goals as of 29 August 2026 ‡ National team caps and goals as of 16 July 2017

Alyaksandr Katlyaraw (Belarusian: Аляксандр Катляраў; Russian: Александр Котляров; born 30 January 1993) is a Belarusian professional footballer who plays for Molodechno.
