= Denis Levitsky =

Belarusian footballer

Personal information
- Full name: Denis Arkadyevich Levitsky
- Date of birth: 5 February 1997 (age 29)
- Place of birth: Mokryanskiye Khutora, Bykhaw district, Mogilev region, Belarus
- Height: 1.85 m (6 ft 1 in)
- Position: Defender

Team information
- Current team: Dynamo Brest
- Number: 11

Youth career
- 2013–2014: Dnepr Mogilev

Senior career*
Years	Team	Apps	(Gls)
2015–2018	Dnepr Mogilev	75	(9)
2018–2020	Torpedo-BelAZ Zhodino	22	(0)
2020	→ Belshina Bobruisk (loan)	12	(4)
2021	Gomel	24	(2)
2022–2023	SKA-Khabarovsk	24	(2)
2023–2024	Torpedo-BelAZ Zhodino	33	(1)
2025	Maxline Vitebsk	4	(1)
2026–	Dynamo Brest	12	(0)

International career^{‡}
2017–2018	Belarus U21	4	(0)
2024	Belarus	1	(0)
- * Club domestic league appearances and goals as of 6 July 2026 ‡ National team caps and goals as of 11 June 2024

Denis Arkadyevich Levitsky (Belarusian: Дзяніс Аркадзьевіч Лявіцкі; Russian: Денис Аркадьевич Левицкий; born 5 February 1997) is a Belarusian professional footballer who plays for Dynamo Brest.

== International career ==
Levitsky made his debut for the Belarus national team on 11 June 2024 in a friendly against Israel at the Szusza Ferenc Stadion in Budapest, Hungary. He started the game and played 61 minutes, as Belarus lost 0–4.

== Honours ==
Gomel

- Belarusian Cup winner: 2021–22
