= Igor Slyusar =

Ukrainian ice hockey player

- Born: May 22, 1989 (age 35); Kyiv, Ukrainian SSR, USSR
- Height: 5 ft 10 in (178 cm)
- Weight: 154 lb (70 kg; 11 st 0 lb)
- Position: Forward
- Shoots: Left
- PHL team Former teams: Bilyi Bars; HC Berkut; Sokil Kyiv
- Playing career: 2004–present

Igor Vasilyevich Slyusar (Ukrainian: Ігор Васильович Слюсар, Russian: Игорь Васильевич Слюсарь) (born May 22, 1989) is a Ukrainian professional ice hockey player currently playing for Bilyi Bars of the Professional Hockey League.

== Awards and achievements ==
- 2009 Champion of Ukraine
- 2010 Champion of Ukraine
