= Pavel Kuptsov =

Belarusian footballer

Personal information
- Date of birth: 6 January 1998 (age 28)
- Place of birth: Mogilev, Belarus
- Position: Forward

Team information
- Current team: Gorki
- Number: 16

Youth career
- 2014–2015: Dnepr Mogilev

Senior career*
Years	Team	Apps	(Gls)
2014–2015	Dnepr Mogilev	8	(0)
2016	Torpedo Mogilev	6	(0)
2018–	Gorki	112	(41)

International career
2014	Belarus U17	3	(1)
- * Club domestic league appearances and goals as of 31 December 2022

Pavel Kuptsov (Belarusian: Павал Купцоў; Russian: Павел Купцов; born 6 January 1998) is a Belarusian footballer playing currently for Gorki.
