= Anton Sorokin =

Belarusian footballer

Personal information
- Date of birth: 21 February 1996 (age 30)
- Place of birth: Kobrin, Brest Oblast, Belarus
- Height: 1.76 m (5 ft 9 1/2 in)
- Position: Midfielder

Youth career
- 2012–2014: Neman Grodno

Senior career*
Years	Team	Apps	(Gls)
2015–2018	Neman Grodno	1	(0)
2015	→ Baranovichi (loan)	24	(1)
2017–2018	→ Baranovichi (loan)	45	(1)
2019	Smorgon	12	(0)
2019–2024	Baranovichi	97	(6)

International career
2012–2013	Belarus U17	5	(0)
- * Club domestic league appearances and goals as of 10 December 2024

Anton Sorokin (Belarusian: Антон Сарокін; Russian: Антон Сорокин; born 21 February 1996) is a Belarusian professional footballer.
