= Roman Plekhov =

Belarusian footballer

Personal information
- Date of birth: 10 September 1997 (age 29)
- Place of birth: Minsk, Belarus
- Height: 1.80 m (5 ft 11 in)
- Position: Midfielder

Youth career
- 2012–2014: RCOP-BGU Minsk

Senior career*
Years	Team	Apps	(Gls)
2014–2020	Energetik-BGU Minsk	121	(9)
2019	→ Smorgon (loan)	12	(0)
2020	→ Krumkachy Minsk (loan)	14	(1)

International career^{‡}
2013	Belarus U17	1	(0)
- * Club domestic league appearances and goals as of 31 December 2020 ‡ National team caps and goals as of 23 October 2013

Roman Plekhov (Belarusian: Раман Плехаў; Russian: Роман Плехов; born 10 September 1997) is a Belarusian former professional footballer.
