= Wictor Dias =

Brazilian footballer

Personal information
- Full name: Wictor Emmanuel Dias
- Date of birth: 23 August 2000 (age 26)
- Place of birth: Bandeirantes, Mato Grosso do Sul, Brazil
- Height: 1.77 m (5 ft 10 in)
- Position: Midfielder

Youth career
- 2014–2016: Rio Claro
- 2016–2017: Hidrolandense
- 2017–2018: Atlético Goianiense

Senior career*
| Years | Team | Apps | (Gls) |
| 2019–2020 | Energetik-BGU Minsk | 9 | (0) |
- * Club domestic league appearances and goals as of 31 December 2020

Wictor Emmanuel Dias (born 23 August 2000) is a Brazilian former professional footballer.
