= Denis Golenko =

Belarusian footballer

Personal information
- Date of birth: 13 March 1996 (age 30)
- Place of birth: Mogilev, Belarus
- Position: Midfielder

Youth career
- 2012–2015: Gomel

Senior career*
Years	Team	Apps	(Gls)
2015	Gomel	3	(0)
2016–2018	Lokomotiv Gomel	64	(14)
2018–2019	Belshina Bobruisk	15	(2)
2019–2020	Naftan Novopolotsk	32	(0)
2021–2025	Bumprom Gomel	76	(17)

International career^{‡}
2012–2013	Belarus U17		
- * Club domestic league appearances and goals as of 7 April 2026 ‡ National team caps and goals as of 14 July 2015

Denis Golenko (Belarusian: Дзяніс Галенка; Russian: Денис Голенко; born 13 March 1996) is a Belarusian professional footballer.
