= Fedor Sapon =

Belarusian footballer

Personal information
- Date of birth: 18 March 1993 (age 33)
- Place of birth: Minsk, Belarus
- Position: Forward

Youth career
- 2008: Lokomotiv Minsk
- 2009–2011: Minsk

Senior career*
Years	Team	Apps	(Gls)
2012–2015	Minsk	3	(0)
2012–2014	→ Minsk-2	77	(26)
2015	→ Bereza-2010 (loan)	9	(0)
2016–2017	Torpedo Minsk	44	(12)
2018	Smorgon	20	(2)
2020	Granit Mikashevichi	15	(0)

International career
2009	Belarus U19		
- * Club domestic league appearances and goals as of 31 December 2020

Fedor Sapon (Belarusian: Фёдар Сапон; Russian: Фёдор Сапон; born 18 March 1993) is a Belarusian former footballer.
