= Aleksandr Krasiy =

Belarusian footballer

Personal information
- Date of birth: 17 March 1990 (age 36)
- Place of birth: Vitebsk, Byelorussian SSR, Soviet Union
- Position: Defender

Youth career
- 2007–2010: Vitebsk

Senior career*
Years	Team	Apps	(Gls)
2012–2013	Polotsk	34	(1)
2013	Vitebsk	12	(0)
2014–2016	Slonim	59	(6)
2016–2017	Granit Mikashevichi	42	(3)
2018	Slonim-2017	24	(5)
2019–2021	Naftan Novopolotsk	60	(4)
- * Club domestic league appearances and goals as of 31 December 2021

Aleksandr Krasiy (Belarusian: Аляксандр Красій; Russian: Александр Красий; born 17 March 1990) is a Belarusian professional footballer.
