= Vladislav Mukhamedov =

Belarusian footballer

Personal information
- Date of birth: 4 January 1998 (age 28)
- Place of birth: Minsk, Belarus
- Height: 1.82 m (5 ft 11 1/2 in)
- Position: Forward

Youth career
- 2015–2017: BATE Borisov

Senior career*
Years	Team	Apps	(Gls)
2015–2021	BATE Borisov	10	(0)
2019–2020	→ Smolevichi (loan)	28	(3)
2020	→ Energetik-BGU Minsk (loan)	3	(1)
2021	→ Dnepr Mogilev (loan)	26	(4)

International career^{‡}
2016–2017	Belarus U19	5	(1)
2019	Belarus U21	2	(0)
- * Club domestic league appearances and goals as of 31 December 2021 ‡ National team caps and goals as of 19 November 2019

Vladislav Mukhamedov (Belarusian: Уладзіслаў Мухамедаў; Russian: Владислав Мухамедов; born 4 January 1998) is a Belarusian former professional footballer.

== Honours ==
BATE Borisov

- Belarusian Premier League champion: 2017, 2018
- Belarusian Cup winner: 2019–20
