= Vladimir Karp =

Belarusian footballer

Personal information
- Date of birth: 9 October 1994 (age 32)
- Place of birth: Minsk, Belarus
- Height: 1.82 m (5 ft 11 1/2 in)
- Position: Forward

Team information
- Current team: Constructorul Leova

Youth career
- 2010–2014: BATE Borisov

Senior career*
Years	Team	Apps	(Gls)
2014–2016	BATE Borisov	0	(0)
2014–2015	→ Isloch Minsk Raion (loan)	22	(1)
2015–2016	→ Krumkachy Minsk (loan)	25	(7)
2017	Luch Minsk	3	(0)
2017	Krumkachy Minsk	11	(0)
2018	Naftan Novopolotsk	23	(3)
2019–2021	Lida	61	(6)
2021	Osipovichi	14	(6)
2022	Bocheński KS	12	(2)
2022	Osipovichi	8	(1)
2023	GKS Drwinia		
2023–	Constructorul Leova		

International career
2014	Belarus U21	2	(0)
- * Club domestic league appearances and goals as of 31 December 2022

Vladimir Karp (Belarusian: Уладзімір Карп; Russian: Владимир Карп; born 9 October 1994) is a Belarusian professional footballer who plays as a forward for Constructorul Leova.
