= Vladislav Fedosov =

Belarusian professional footballer

Personal information
- Date of birth: 5 May 1998 (age 28)
- Place of birth: Mogilev, Belarus
- Height: 1.92 m (6 ft 4 in)
- Position: Forward

Team information
- Current team: Slutsk
- Number: 11

Youth career
- 2014–2015: Dnepr Mogilev

Senior career*
Years	Team	Apps	(Gls)
2015–2018	Dnepr Mogilev	56	(4)
2019–2021	Vitebsk	32	(3)
2021	Dnepr Mogilev	14	(1)
2022	Neftchi Kochkor-Ata	5	(0)
2022	Volna Pinsk	10	(1)
2023	Orsha	32	(15)
2024	Molodechno	34	(7)
2025	Dnepr Mogilev	29	(10)
2026–	Slutsk	13	(4)

International career
2018–2019	Belarus U21	7	(1)
- * Club domestic league appearances and goals as of 6 July 2026

Vladislav Fedosov (Belarusian: Уладзіслаў Фядосаў; Russian: Владислав Федосов; born 5 May 1998) is a Belarusian professional footballer who plays for Slutsk.
