= FC Gorki =

FC Gorki FC Horki
- Full name: Football Club Horki/Gorki
- Founded: 2003
- Ground: Sputnik Stadium, Horki
- Capacity: 1,000
- Head Coach: Vasiliy Yefimenko
- League: Belarusian Second League
- 2020: 8th

FC Gorki or FK Horki (Belarusian and Russian: ФК Горкі) is a Belarusian football club based in Horki (Gorki), Mogilev (Mahilyow) Oblast.

== History ==
FC Gorki played in the Belarusian Second League for three seasons (from 2004 till 2006). Before and after this period, they have been playing in the Mogilev Oblast league.

The club won the Mogilev Oblast league three times (2012, 2013, 2015) and qualified several times for the early stages of the Belarusian Cup in recent seasons.

== Current squad ==
As of October 2023

Note: Flags indicate national team as defined under FIFA eligibility rules; some limited exceptions apply. Players may hold more than one non-FIFA nationality.

No.	Pos.	Nation	Player
—	GK	BLR	Boris Abramovich
—	GK	BLR	Ruslan Kapantsow
—	GK	BLR	Dmitriy Sidorov
—	DF	BLR	Ivan Gref
—	DF	BLR	Pavel Zhurawloyw
—	DF	BLR	Daniil Katusov
—	DF	BLR	Yawhen Kisyalyow
—	DF	BLR	Vladimir Korolevich
—	DF	BLR	Artemiy Matyushenko
—	DF	BLR	Pavel Moskalev
—	DF	BLR	Uladzimir Khilkevich
—	MF	BLR	Dzmitry Bubnow

No.	Pos.	Nation	Player
—	MF	BLR	Gleb Groskreyts
—	MF	BLR	Dzmitry Kazlow
—	FW	BLR	Pavel Kuptsov
—	MF	BLR	Yevgeniy Latyshev
—	MF	BLR	Stanislav Makarov
—	MF	BLR	Roman Pytkov
—	MF	BLR	Maksim Khodenkov
—	MF	BLR	Viktor Chernykh
—	FW	BLR	Ruslan Golovin
—	FW	BLR	Vladimir Khaustovich
—	FW	BLR	Artem Shebeko
—	FW	BLR	Vladislav Shelkovskiy
