= Maksym Slyusar =

Ukrainian footballer (born 1997)

Personal information
- Full name: Maksym Maksymovych Slyusar
- Date of birth: 1 July 1997 (age 29)
- Place of birth: Luhansk, Ukraine
- Height: 1.80 m (5 ft 11 in)
- Position: Midfielder

Team information
- Current team: Dinamo Lugansk

Youth career
- 2010–2012: Zorya Luhansk
- 2013: Metalurh Donetsk
- 2013: Zorya Luhansk

Senior career*
Years	Team	Apps	(Gls)
2013–2015	Zorya Luhansk	0	(0)
2017–2021	Slavia Mozyr	109	(29)
2023–	Dinamo Lugansk		

International career
2013	Ukraine U16	2	(0)
- * Club domestic league appearances and goals as of 23:51, 13 December 2021 (UTC)

Maksym Slyusar (Ukrainian: Максим Максимович Слюсар; born 1 July 1997) is a professional Ukrainian football midfielder.

== Career ==
Slusar is the product of the FC Zorya Luhansk youth system.

He continued his career in the Ukrainian Premier League Reserves, but never was promoted to the main-team squad and in December 2015 he was excluded from the team among other players, as he was suspected of participating in match fixing. In March 2017 he signed a contract with Belarusian side Slavia Mozyr.

In 2023 Slyusar joined Dinamo Lugansk (representing LNR) in Commonwealth League.
