= Aleksandr Kucherov =

Belarusian footballer

Personal information
- Date of birth: 22 January 1995 (age 31)
- Place of birth: Slutsk, Belarus
- Height: 1.77 m (5 ft 9 1/2 in)
- Position: Midfielder

Team information
- Current team: Orsha
- Number: 14

Youth career
- 2011–2014: Dinamo Minsk

Senior career*
| Years | Team | Apps | (Gls) |
| 2014–2015 | Dinamo Minsk | 1 | (0) |
| 2015 | → Bereza-2010 (loan) | 12 | (1) |
| 2016 | Vitebsk | 1 | (0) |
| 2016 | → Orsha (loan) | 14 | (5) |
| 2017 | Torpedo Minsk | 15 | (1) |
| 2018 | Khimik Svetlogorsk | 17 | (2) |
| 2019 | Orsha | 28 | (6) |
| 2020–2022 | Naftan Novopolotsk | 64 | (9) |
| 2023 | Orsha | 14 | (0) |
| 2023 | FSK Orsha | 3 | (2) |
| 2024– | Orsha | 16 | (2) |

International career
- Belarus U19
| 2014 | Belarus U21 | 2 | (0) |
- * Club domestic league appearances and goals as of 10 December 2024

Aleksandr Kucherov (Belarusian: Аляксандр Кучараў; Russian: Александр Кучеров; born 22 January 1995) is a Belarusian professional football player who plays for Orsha.
