= Fanipal =

Town in Minsk Region, Belarus

Fanipal Фаніпаль (Belarusian) Фаниполь (Russian)
- Town
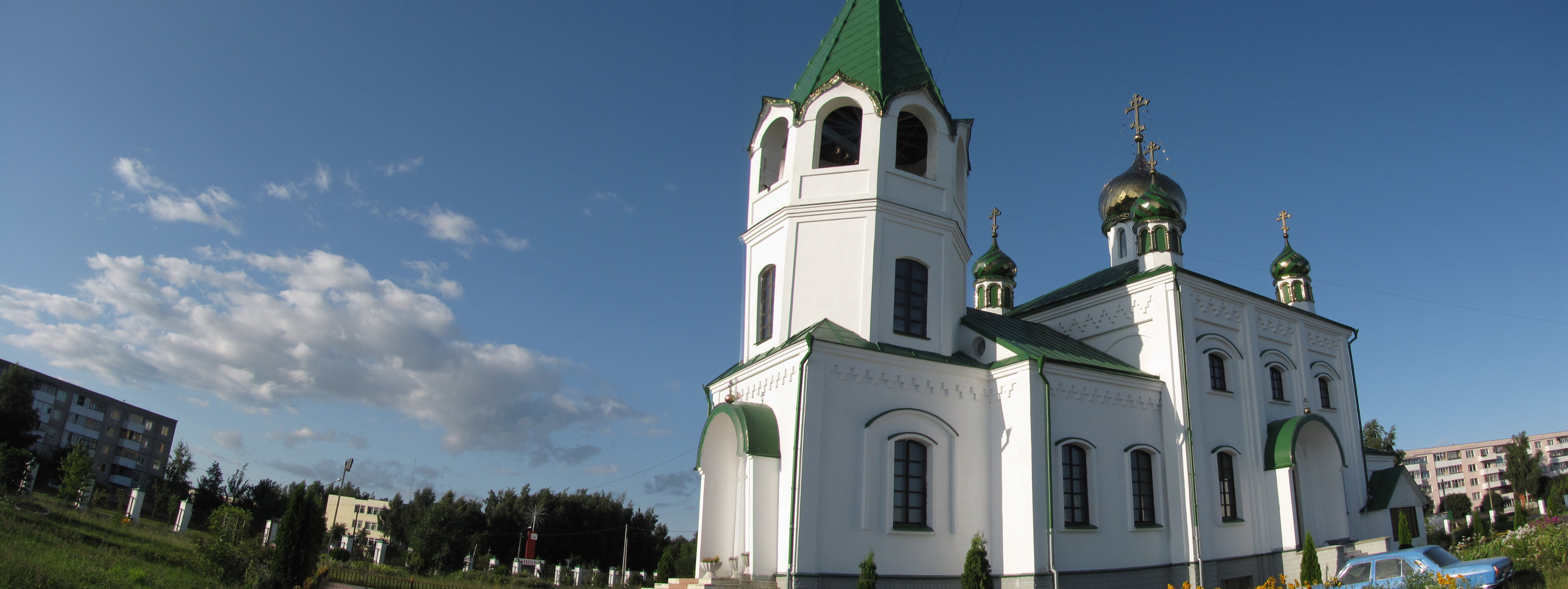

- Coat of arms

- Location within Belarus
- Coordinates: 53°45′N 27°20′E
- Country: Belarus
- Region: Minsk Region
- District: Dzyarzhynsk District
- First mentioned: 1856

Area
  - Total: 4.75 km^{2} (1.83 sq mi)
  - Land: 4.75 km^{2} (1.83 sq mi)
  - Water: 0 km^{2} (0 sq mi)

Population (2026)
  - Total: 19,006
  - Density: 4,000/km^{2} (10,400/sq mi)
- Time zone: UTC+3 (MSK)
- Postal code: 222750
- Area code: +375 1716
- License plate: 5
- Website: Official website

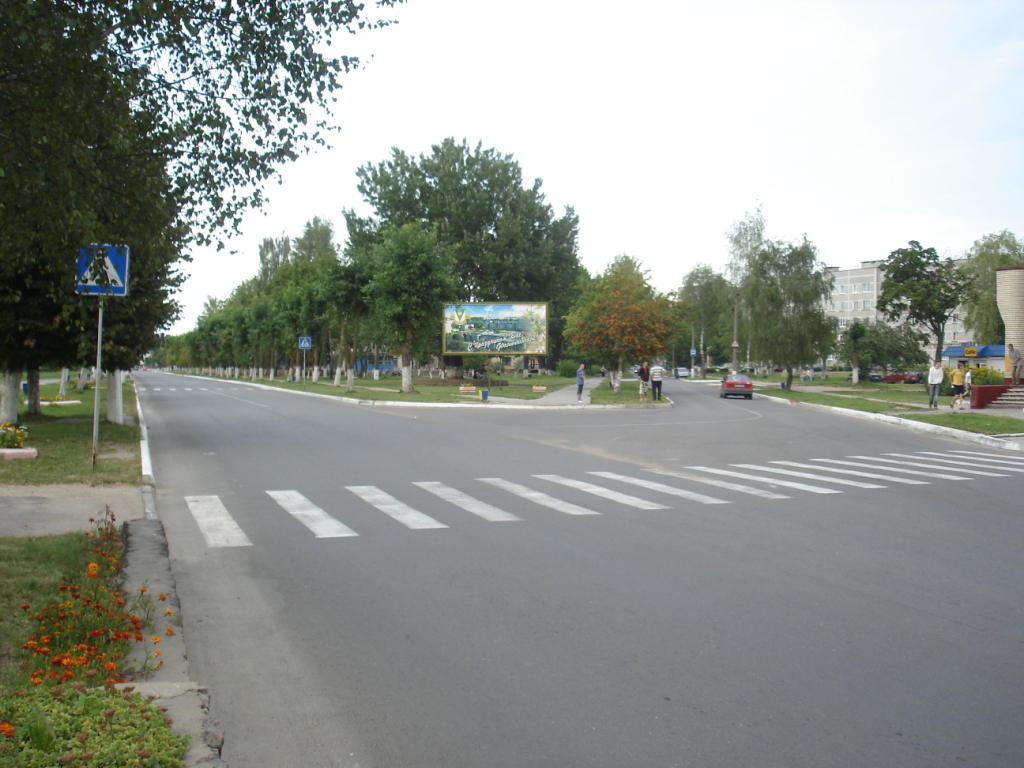
Komsomolskaya str. and Yakuba Kolasa str. crossroads

Fanipal or Fanipol (Note: Belarusian: Фаніпаль, romanized: Fanipal; Russian: Фаниполь; Polish: Fanipal; Lithuanian: Fanipalis.) is a town in Minsk Region, Belarus. Fanipal is located in Dzyarzhynsk District, 24 km (15 mi) southwest of Minsk and 13 km (8.1 mi) southwest of the Minsk Automobile Ring Road. As of 2026, it has a population of 19,006.

== History ==
The community that became Fanipal was first mentioned in 1856. According to documents in the Central State Historical Archive of Belarus, it was the former possession of landowners named Enelpheldt and Bogdashevsky. In 1870 a railway stop opened, and in 1871 the railway stop become the Tokarevskaya railway station, named in honor of the governor of the Minsk Governorate, Vladimir Tokarev, who was also the founder of the Brest-Moscow railway. On August 9, 1876 the railway station was renamed Fanipol. In 1965 the first factory was opened, producing reinforced concrete bridge components, this is the only factory in Belarus which produces these items. Once it was established as an industrial center, it grew rapidly. On April 29, 1984, Fanipol was designated a "City Settlement" and on June 22, 1999 Fanipol was designated a regional city center. In 2006 people of Fanipol celebrated the 150th anniversary of their city.

== Geography ==
=== Overview ===
Situated in south-western suburb of Minsk, is part of its urban area and one of its main satellite towns also with Zaslawye and Machulishchy.

=== Districts ===
There are now 5 administrative districts in Fanipal:

- Molodyozhny (Youth).
- Severny (Northern).
- Tsentralny (Midtown).
- Zavodskoy (Factory district). District where factory workers live.
- Yuzhny (Southern)
- In addition, the Industrial area is not considered as a formal district.

== Transportation ==
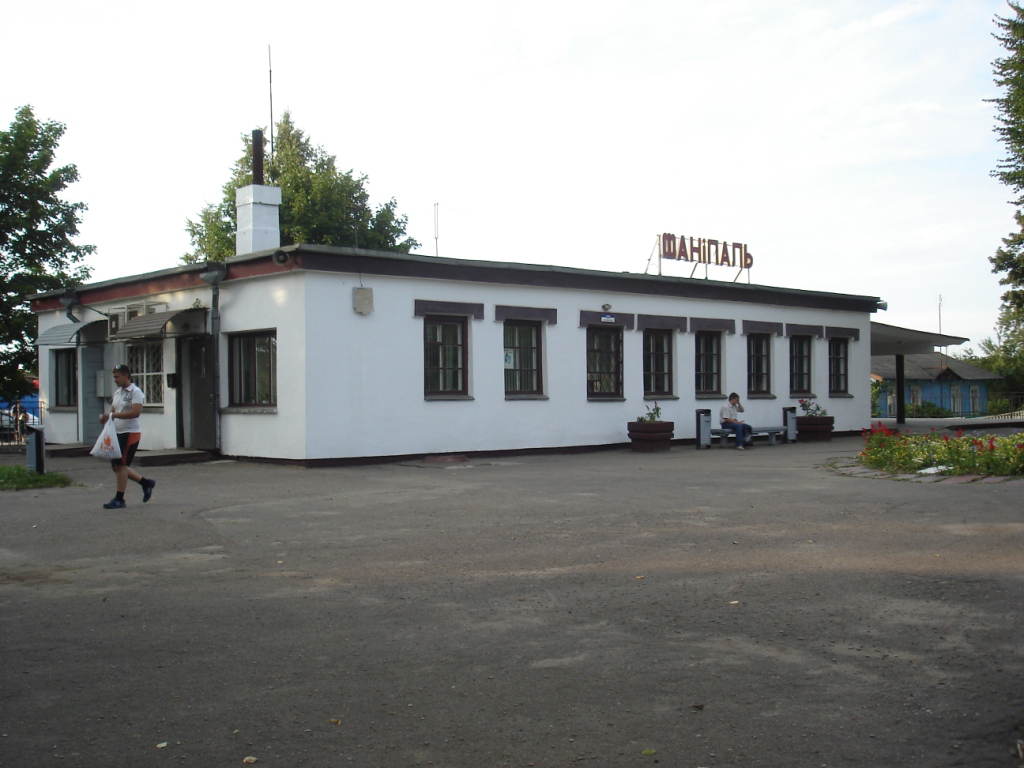
Fanipol railway station.

Fanipol has a station on the Brest-Moscow railroad. Fanipol is situated near the M-1 (E-30) highway, which runs from Brest to Moscow through Minsk (Brest-Minsk-Moscow). Fanipol is well connected with Minsk, Dzyarzhynsk, and all of Belarus as well as other nations via the Minsk and M-1 Highways.

== Industry ==
Fanipol's industry began in the 1960s, leading to rapid growth of the city.

- The Fanipol reinforced concrete bridge factory is unique in Belarus. It was the first factory in Fanipol, built in 1965.
- The Agrarian Cooperative "Agrokombinat Dzerzhinsky" is the largest producer in Belarus of poultry, eggs, and related products. The factory is nicknamed "The Factory of Health" and has received many domestic and foreign awards for agricultural innovation.
- CJSC Stadler Minsk is the plant owned by Stadler Rail AG (Switzerland). The plant is responsible for the production of broad gauge rolling stock for CIS countries.
- Other factories in Fanipol include: Unomedical (owned by Convatec, produces single-use medical devices), Energomera (produces counters), a gravel works, Fanipol RMP (a mechanical repair facility) and many others.

== Gallery ==
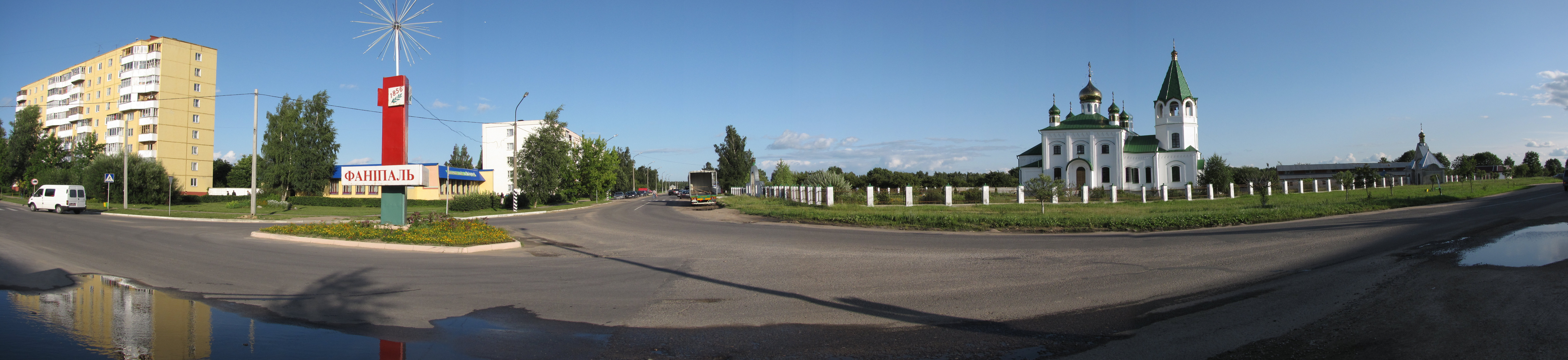
Panorama of Fanipal
