= Yawhen Barsukow =

Belarusian professional footballer

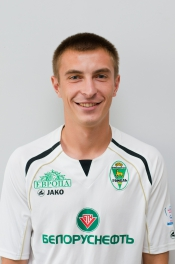

Personal information
- Date of birth: 5 July 1990 (age 36)
- Place of birth: Gomel, Belarusian SSR
- Height: 1.70 m (5 ft 7 in)
- Position: Forward

Team information
- Current team: Gomel
- Number: 8

Youth career
- 2005–2008: Gomel

Senior career*
Years	Team	Apps	(Gls)
2008–2013	Gomel	28	(1)
2011–2013	→ Vedrich-97 Rechitsa (loan)	62	(18)
2013–2014	Rechitsa-2014	39	(9)
2015	Gomelzheldortrans	30	(8)
2016–2017	Gomel	36	(12)
2017–2018	Dnepr Mogilev	44	(2)
2019–2020	Smolevichi	38	(18)
2020–2023	Slavia Mozyr	86	(12)
2024–	Gomel	46	(6)

International career
2010	Belarus U21	4	(0)
- * Club domestic league appearances and goals as of 6 July 2026

Yawhen Barsukow (Belarusian: Яўген Барсукоў; Russian: Евгений Юрьевич Барсуков; born 5 July 1990) is a Belarusian professional footballer who plays for Gomel.
