= Yevgeny Nikitin (footballer) =

Belarusian footballer

Personal information
- Date of birth: 9 April 1993 (age 33)
- Place of birth: Rechitsa, Belarus
- Height: 1.82 m (5 ft 11 1/2 in)
- Position: Forward

Youth career
- 2010–2013: Dinamo Minsk

Senior career*
Years	Team	Apps	(Gls)
2012–2015	Dinamo Minsk	10	(1)
2012	→ Bereza-2010 (loan)	24	(1)
2013	→ Bereza-2010 (loan)	12	(6)
2015	→ Bereza-2010 (loan)	2	(0)
2016–2018	Torpedo Minsk	57	(8)
2019–2020	Sputnik Rechitsa	35	(8)
2023	DYuSSh-2 Rechitsa	3	(0)

International career
2011	Belarus U19	2	(0)
2012–2013	Belarus U21	7	(1)
- * Club domestic league appearances and goals as of 31 December 2023

Yevgeny Nikitin (Belarusian: Яўген Нiкiцiн; Russian: Евгений Никитин; born 9 April 1993) is a Belarusian professional football player.
