= Nikita Melnikov (footballer) =

Russian footballer (born 1997)

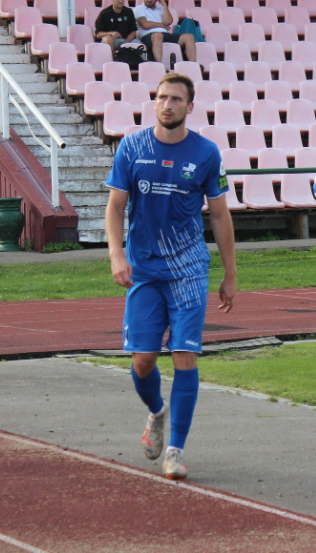

Personal information
- Full name: Nikita Mikhailovich Melnikov
- Date of birth: 28 February 1997 (age 29)
- Place of birth: Moscow, Russia
- Height: 1.90 m (6 ft 3 in)
- Position: Forward

Team information
- Current team: Alay
- Number: 18

Youth career
- 2011–2013: Spartak Moscow
- 2013–2014: FShM Moscow

Senior career*
Years	Team	Apps	(Gls)
2014–2015	Torpedo Moscow	0	(0)
2016	LFK Lokomotiv Moscow		
2017–2018	Arsenal Tula	0	(0)
2018	→ Strogino Moscow (loan)	8	(0)
2018	Saturn Ramenskoye	10	(0)
2019–2021	Slavia Mozyr	69	(7)
2022	Arsenal Dzerzhinsk	0	(0)
2023	Slutsk	11	(5)
2023	Spartak Kostroma	13	(0)
2024	Slutsk	28	(3)
2025	Persikabo 1973	6	(4)
2025–2026	Algha Bishkek	12	(2)
2026–	Alay	11	(4)
- * Club domestic league appearances and goals as of 12 June 2026

Nikita Mikhailovich Melnikov (Russian: Никита Михайлович Мельников; born 28 February 1997) is a Russian professional footballer who plays as a forward for Kyrgyz Premier League club Alay.

== Club career ==
He made his debut in the Russian Professional Football League for FC Strogino Moscow on 7 April 2018 in a game against FC Zorky Krasnogorsk.
