= FC Viktoriya Maryina Gorka =

Football club in Marjina Horka, Belarus

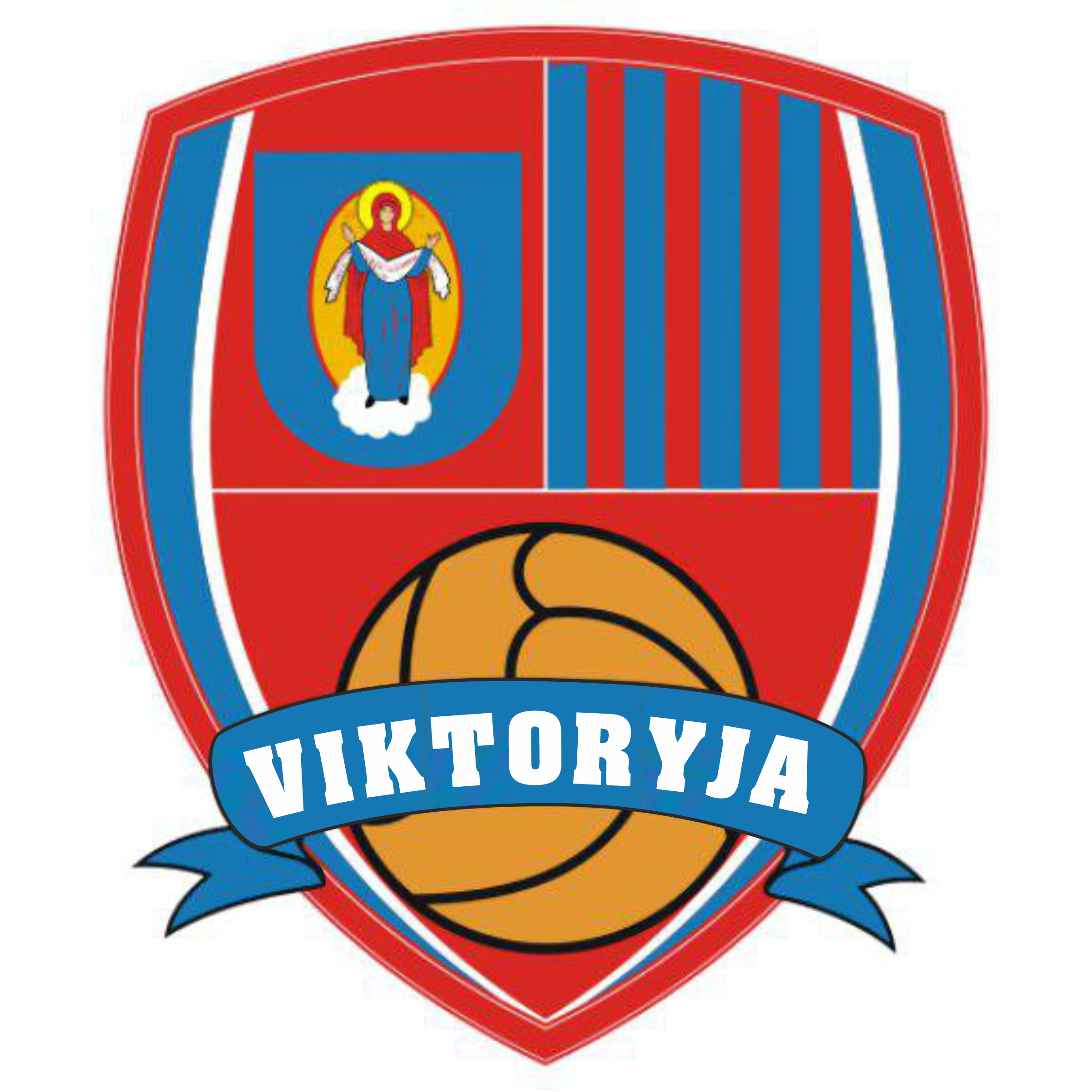
- Full name: Football Club Viktoriya Maryina Gorka
- Founded: 1990
- Ground: City Stadium, Maryina Horka, Belarus
- Capacity: 1,500
- Manager: Sergey Duboyenko
- League: Belarusian Second League
- 2020: 10th
Home colours	Away colours

FC Viktoriya Maryina Gorka is a Belarusian football club based in Maryina Gorka (Maryina Horka), Minsk Region.

== History ==
The team was founded in 1990 as FC Belarus Maryina Gorka and until 1991, they played in the lower levels of the Belarusian SSR league. In 1992, Belarus joined the newly created Belarusian First League. After the 1992–93 season, Belarus withdrew to amateur level due to lack of funds. They returned to the professional level in 1996, when they changed their name to Energiya-TEC-5 Maryina Gorka and joined the Belarusian Second League. The next year, Energiya-TEC-5 relocated to the neighbour village Druzhny, and after the end of the 1997 season, the team was disbanded.

The club was reformed to play in Minsk Region league as Zvezda Maryina Gorka from 2002 until 2005 and again since 2010. Between 2010 and 2012, the club was known as Zvezda Pukhovichi, and during 2013–2014 as Zvezda-RFOC-Viktoriya Pukhovichi, representing the neighboring town of Pukhavichy, 6 km northeast from Maryina Gorka.

In 2015, the club rejoined the Belarusian Second League for the first time since 1997 as Viktoriya Maryina Gorka.

== Current squad ==
As of October 2023

Note: Flags indicate national team as defined under FIFA eligibility rules; some limited exceptions apply. Players may hold more than one non-FIFA nationality.

No.	Pos.	Nation	Player
—	GK	(Belarus) BLR	Roman Babayev
—	GK	(Belarus) BLR	Vasiliy Dalidovich
—	GK	(Belarus) BLR	Dmitriy Zakharevich
—	DF	(Russia) RUS	Dmitri Vavilov
—	DF	(Belarus) BLR	Artur Kireyev
—	DF	(Belarus) BLR	Alyaksey Kisyalyow
—	DF	(Belarus) BLR	Vladislav Lagun
—	DF	(Belarus) BLR	Vadim Migalenya
—	DF	(Belarus) BLR	Dmitriy Naumchik
—	DF	(Belarus) BLR	Ivan Prokhorenko
—	FW	(Belarus) BLR	Andrey Boyarin
—	MF	(Belarus) BLR	Denis Golotsukov
—	MF	(Belarus) BLR	Maksim Guminskiy
—	MF	(Belarus) BLR	Mikalay Davydzenka
—	DF	(Belarus) BLR	Petr Zyl

No.	Pos.	Nation	Player
—	MF	(Belarus) BLR	Mikhail Lukhvich
—	MF	(Belarus) BLR	Denis Lyakh
—	MF	(Belarus) BLR	Mikita Makaraw
—	MF	(Belarus) BLR	Anton Novik
—	MF	(Belarus) BLR	Pavel Semkin
—	FW	(Belarus) BLR	Dmitriy Sinyavskiy
—	MF	(Belarus) BLR	Sergey Tarchilo
—	MF	(Belarus) BLR	Farrukh Sharipov
—	MF	(Belarus) BLR	Ivan Sharko
—	FW	(Belarus) BLR	Aleksandr Yevtukhovich
—	FW	(Belarus) BLR	Vladislav Zhalevich
—	FW	(Belarus) BLR	Sergey Kuchmel
—	FW	(Belarus) BLR	Syarhey Lizunow
—	FW	(Belarus) BLR	Andrey Mikhalchuk
—	FW	(Belarus) BLR	Andrey Panasik
