= Vitaliy Ganich =

Belarusian footballer

Personal information
- Date of birth: 29 August 1993 (age 33)
- Place of birth: Soligorsk, Minsk Oblast, Belarus
- Height: 1.79 m (5 ft 10 1/2 in)
- Position: Forward

Team information
- Current team: Soligorsk
- Number: 9

Youth career
- 2007–2012: Shakhtyor Soligorsk
- 2013–2014: Slutsk

Senior career*
Years	Team	Apps	(Gls)
2014	Slutsk	1	(0)
2015	Smorgon	9	(1)
2015	Orsha	15	(1)
2016–2017	Smorgon	50	(10)
2018	Baranovichi	17	(1)
2019	Smorgon	25	(6)
2020–2022	Shakhtyor Petrikov	70	(22)
2023–2024	Partizan Soligorsk	17	(15)
2025–	Soligorsk	12	(6)
- * Club domestic league appearances and goals as of 4 April 2026

Vitaliy Ganich (Belarusian: Віталь Ганіч; Russian: Виталий Ганич; born 29 August 1993) is a Belarusian professional footballer who plays for Soligorsk.
