= FC Dnyapro Mogilev =

Dnyapro Mogilev
- Full name: Football Club Dnyapro
- Founded: 2019
- Dissolved: 2020
- Ground: Spartak Stadium, Mogilev
- Capacity: 7,350
- 2019: Premier League, 14th (relegated)
Home colours	Away colours	Third colours

FC Dnyapro Mogilev (Belarusian: ФК Дняпро Магілёў; Russian: ФК Дняпро Могилёв) was a Belarusian football club from Mogilev. Their home stadium is Spartak Stadium.

== History ==
Dnyapro Mogilev was founded in early 2019 as a result of merger between Dnepr Mogilev and Luch Minsk. The united club inherited Luch's Premier League spot and licence, their sponsorships and most of the squad, while keeping only a few of Dnepr players and relocating to Mogilev. Dnepr and Luch continued its participation in youth tournaments independently from each other.

Following the relegation from Premier League Dnyapro Mogilev disbanded and Dnepr Mogilev was re-established in the Second League.
