= Dmitry Tamelo =

Belarusian footballer

Personal information
- Date of birth: 8 November 1992 (age 34)
- Place of birth: Minsk, Belarus
- Height: 1.78 m (5 ft 10 in)
- Position: Midfielder

Team information
- Current team: Polotsk

Youth career
- 2010–2011: Minsk

Senior career*
Years	Team	Apps	(Gls)
2012–2016	Zvezda-BGU Minsk	107	(15)
2017–2019	Torpedo Minsk	66	(14)
2019–2021	Naftan Novopolotsk	61	(19)
2022	Smorgon	21	(7)
2023–2024	Naftan Novopolotsk	24	(2)
2024	→ Orsha (loan)	14	(5)
2024–2025	Orsha	42	(11)
2026–	Polotsk	0	(0)
- * Club domestic league appearances and goals as of 8 April 2026

Dmitry Tamelo (Belarusian: Дзмітрый Тамела; Russian: Дмитрий Тамело; born 8 November 1992) is a Belarusian professional footballer who plays for Polotsk.
