= Dzmitry Ivanow =

Belarusian footballer

Personal information
- Date of birth: 21 February 1997 (age 29)
- Place of birth: Vitebsk, Belarus
- Height: 1.83 m (6 ft 0 in)
- Position: Forward

Youth career
- 2013–2015: Vitebsk

Senior career*
Years	Team	Apps	(Gls)
2013–2015	Vitebsk	1	(0)
2013–2014	→ Vitebsk-2	12	(3)
2016–2018	Torpedo Minsk	11	(3)
2017	→ Orsha (loan)	8	(0)
2017	→ Energetik-BGU Minsk (loan)	11	(0)
2018	→ Orsha (loan)	23	(3)
2019	Orsha	27	(17)
2020–2021	Neman Grodno	9	(0)
- * Club domestic league appearances and goals as of 31 May 2021

Dzmitry Ivanow (Belarusian: Дзмітрый Іваноў; Russian: Дмитрий Иванов; born 21 February 1997) is a Belarusian former professional footballer.
