= FC Ivatsevichi =

- Full name: Football club Ivatsevichi
- Founded: 2016
- Ground: Klenovka Arena
- Manager: Dzmitry Milewski
- League: Belarusian Second League
- 2020: 13th

FC Ivatsevichi is a Belarusian football club based in Ivatsevichy (Ivatsevichi) in Brest Oblast. The club currently plays in Belarusian Second League.

== History ==
The club was founded in 2016. They spent first two years playing in Brest Oblast league. In 2018 FC Ivatsevichi joined Belarusian Second League.

== Current squad ==
As of October 2023

Note: Flags indicate national team as defined under FIFA eligibility rules; some limited exceptions apply. Players may hold more than one non-FIFA nationality.

No.	Pos.	Nation	Player
—	GK	(Belarus) BLR	Nikita Kurlenya
—	GK	(Belarus) BLR	Dmitriy Filyuta
—	DF	(Belarus) BLR	Anton Bankalyuk
—	DF	(Belarus) BLR	Vladislav Verishko
—	DF	(Belarus) BLR	Dmitriy Litvinchuk
—	DF	(Belarus) BLR	Stanislav Minchuk
—	DF	(Belarus) BLR	Aleksandr Myalik
—	DF	(Belarus) BLR	Mikhail Pesetskiy
—	DF	(Belarus) BLR	Artem Tatarchuk
—	DF	(Belarus) BLR	Yevgeniy Ulasevich
—	DF	(Belarus) BLR	Yevgeniy Vlasovets
—	DF	(Belarus) BLR	Vladislav Shevchuk
—	MF	(Belarus) BLR	Sergey Vodyanovich
—	MF	(Belarus) BLR	Vladislav Vasilishin
—	MF	(Belarus) BLR	Alyaksandr Karalyow

No.	Pos.	Nation	Player
—	MF	(Belarus) BLR	Yevgeniy Kot
—	MF	(Belarus) BLR	Matvey Kot
—	MF	(Belarus) BLR	Artur Migno
—	MF	(Belarus) BLR	Pavel Panasyuk
—	MF	(Belarus) BLR	Vladislav Savko
—	MF	(Belarus) BLR	Yegor Voronovich
—	MF	(Belarus) BLR	Artur Zybailo
—	MF	(Belarus) BLR	Roman Yakovenko
—	FW	(Nigeria) NGA	Anthony Achu Kanu
—	FW	(Belarus) BLR	Vladislav Zhirko
—	FW	(Belarus) BLR	Maksim Korzan
—	FW	(Belarus) BLR	Ivan Mironyuk
—	FW	(Belarus) BLR	Aleksandr Tarasenya
