= FC Underdog Chist =

- Full name: Football Club Underdog Chist
- Founded: 1998
- Ground: School Stadium, Chist
- Capacity: 1,000
- League: Belarusian Second League
- 2019: 15th (First League) ▼
Home colours	Away colours

FC Underdog Chist is a Belarusian football club based in Chist, Minsk Oblast. The team plays in the Belarusian Second League.

== History ==
FC Chist was founded in 1998 as Zabudova Chist. Zabudova played in the Belarusian Second League from 1998 until 2003. Since 2004, the club withdrew from the Second League and started playing in the Minsk Oblast League. During 2004–2005, they were known as Kommunalnik Chist, in 2006 as Zabudova Chist again, and since 2007 they became Zabudova-2007 Chist.

In 2009, Zabudova-2007 won the Minsk Oblast League. In 2011, the club merged with FC Molodechno, which became known as Zabudova Molodechno during the merger. The partnership lasted for two years (2011–2012), during which time Zabudova-2007 acted as a farm club of Molodechno team. Since 2013, they became independent again. During 2015–2016, the club was known as Zabudova-Stroy Chist.

In 2017, the club was renamed to FC Chist and rejoined the Belarusian Second League. After successfully completing the season as runners-up, they were promoted to the First League in 2018. In 2019, they were renamed to Underdog Chist.
