= 2023 Belarusian First League =

Belarusian First League
- Season: 2023
- Champions: Arsenal Dzerzhinsk
- Promoted: Arsenal Dzerzhinsk; Dnepr Mogilev; Vitebsk
- Relegated: Osipovichi

The 2023 Belarusian First League was the 33rd season of 2nd level football in Belarus. It started in April 2023 and finished in November.

The winners (Arsenal Dzerzhinsk) and runners-up (Dnepr Mogilev) were promoted to the 2024 Belarusian Premier League. The third-placed team (Vitebsk) were also promoted after winning the Belarusian Premier League play-off. The bottom-placed team (Osipovichi) were relegated to the 2024 Belarusian Second League.

== Team changes from 2022 season ==
Two best teams of 2022 Belarusian First League (Naftan Novopolotsk and Smorgon) were promoted to Belarusian Premier League. They were replaced by two last-placed teams of 2022 Belarusian Premier League (Vitebsk and Dnepr Mogilev). Fourth-placed Maxline Rogachev won the promotion/relegation play-off against Arsenal Dzerzhinsk and won right to get promoted, while Arsenal relegated to the First League to replace Maxline.

Due to low number of participants, no team has relegated to the Second League. In attempt to bring the number of teams to 16, three teams were promoted from the Second League (Niva Dolbizno, Zhodino-Yuzhnoye, and Bumprom Gomel).

Maxline Rogachev, who were initially promoted to Premier League, were later denied Premier League license. No other club was chosen to replace them, and Maxline remained in the First League, expanding it to 17 clubs for the season. In the spring 2023, the club relocated from Rogachev to Vitebsk and became known as Maxline Vitebsk.

== Teams summary ==
Location of teams in 2023 Belarusian First League

Team	Location	Position in 2022
Arsenal Dzerzhinsk	Dzerzhinsk	Premier League, 14
Vitebsk	Vitebsk	Premier League, 15
Dnepr Mogilev	Mogilev	Premier League, 16
Shakhtyor Petrikov	Petrikov	3
Maxline Vitebsk	Vitebsk	4
Ostrovets	Ostrovets	5
Lokomotiv Gomel	Gomel	6
Volna Pinsk	Pinsk	7
Molodechno	Molodechno	8
Orsha	Orsha	9
Lida	Lida	10
Slonim-2017	Slonim	11
Osipovichi	Osipovichi	12
Baranovichi	Baranovichi	13
Niva Dolbizno	Dolbizno	Second League, 1
Zhodino-Yuzhnoye	Zhodino	Second League, 5
Bumprom Gomel	Gomel	Second League, 10

== League table ==
Pos	Team	Pld	W	D	L	GF	GA	GD	Pts	Promotion, qualification or relegation
1	Arsenal Dzerzhinsk (C, P)	32	26	3	3	86	30	+56	81	Promotion to Belarusian Premier League
2	Dnepr Mogilev (P)	32	22	7	3	75	24	+51	73 (Note: Head-to-head points: Dnepr Mogilev 4, Vitebsk 1.)	Promotion to Belarusian Premier League
3	Vitebsk (O, P)	32	23	4	5	68	22	+46	73	Qualification for the Belarusian Premier League play-off
4	Lokomotiv Gomel	32	19	5	8	55	40	+15	62	
5	Maxline Vitebsk	32	19	4	9	84	52	+32	61	
6	Baranovichi	32	14	6	12	46	49	−3	48	
7	Zhodino-Yuzhnoye	32	13	7	12	62	52	+10	46	
8	Volna Pinsk	32	12	7	13	41	49	−8	43	
9	Niva Dolbizno	32	12	5	15	53	66	−13	41 (Note: Head-to-head points: Niva Dolbizno 7, Lida 6, Molodechno 4.)	
10	Lida	32	12	5	15	44	48	−4	41	
11	Molodechno	32	11	8	13	51	56	−5	41	
12	Ostrovets	32	10	9	13	54	62	−8	39	
13	Bumprom Gomel	32	10	8	14	45	62	−17	38	
14	Orsha	32	8	7	17	50	62	−12	31	
15	Slonim-2017	32	5	7	20	26	63	−37	22 (Note: Goal difference: Slonim-2017 -37, Shakhtyor Petrikov -39.)	
16	Shakhtyor Petrikov	32	6	4	22	33	72	−39	22	
17	Osipovichi (R)	32	1	2	29	21	85	−64	5	Relegation to Belarusian Second League

Source: football.by
Rules for classification: 1) Points; 2) Head-to-head points; 3) Head-to-head goal difference; 4) Head-to-head goals scored; 5) Goal difference; 6) Matches won; 7) Goals scored.
(C) Champions; (O) Play-off winners; (P) Promoted; (R) Relegated

== Results ==
Home \ Away	ARS	BAR	BUM	DNE	LID	LGM	MAX	MOL	NIV	ORS	OSI	OST	SHP	SLO	VIT	VOL	ZHO
Arsenal Dzerzhinsk	—	3–0	1–0	2–0	7–2	0–1	1–4	6–0	4–1	4–3	4–0	4–0	5–1	1–1	4–0	1–0	3–2
Baranovichi	2–2	—	2–1	0–4	4–2	1–1	2–3	2–0	0–2	3–2	2–0	1–1	2–0	2–1	0–4	3–1	1–1
Bumprom Gomel	1–2	0–2	—	1–1	2–0	0–2	2–2	2–0	3–2	2–2	3–1	0–7	2–1	3–3	0–1	0–0	3–2
Dnepr Mogilev	2–0	1–0	5–0	—	2–1	1–1	2–1	3–0	2–1	3–1	1–0	2–2	6–1	3–1	0–0	3–0	0–1
Lida	1–2	0–1	4–1	0–3	—	0–0	3–2	0–3	0–1	0–0	4–1	4–0	3–1	2–2	1–2	1–1	1–2
Lokomotiv Gomel	1–3	3–1	4–0	0–3	3–0	—	4–1	2–2	3–4	1–2	2–0	2–1	2–0	1–0	2–0	1–0	2–1
Maxline Vitebsk	2–2	5–0	2–0	5–2	1–0	4–0	—	4–2	6–3	0–2	2–1	3–1	0–2	5–1	0–4	1–1	2–2
Molodechno	1–3	2–1	4–0	0–0	2–3	5–0	2–3	—	1–2	1–3	3–0	1–2	2–1	1–0	0–0	2–1	5–1
Niva Dolbizno	0–3	4–3	0–4	3–4	1–2	1–1	0–5	1–1	—	3–1	3–1	1–1	1–3	1–0	1–2	5–2	1–2
Orsha	1–2	1–0	2–2	1–1	0–3	0–3	2–1	1–2	1–1	—	3–0	0–1	3–2	1–2	2–3	0–1	2–5
Osipovichi	0–2	1–3	0–1	2–8	0–3	0–2	1–2	0–1	1–4	1–3	—	1–3	0–1	0–0	0–4	0–2	2–3
Ostrovets	2–4	0–1	2–1	0–0	1–0	0–2	2–5	1–1	1–1	4–4	2–4	—	3–1	1–0	1–2	1–4	0–3
Shakhtyor Petrikov	0–1	1–1	1–1	0–1	0–1	1–2	1–3	3–3	1–3	2–1	1–1	2–4	—	0–1	1–6	2–1	1–5
Slonim-2017	1–5	0–3	2–2	0–5	0–1	1–2	0–5	1–1	0–1	2–1	4–1	0–5	0–1	—	0–3	0–0	2–0
Vitebsk	0–1	0–1	2–1	0–1	0–0	2–0	1–0	3–0	3–0	3–2	5–1	3–0	2–1	4–1	—	3–0	0–0
Volna Pinsk	1–2	1–0	1–4	0–2	2–0	4–2	2–4	2–2	1–0	3–2	2–1	2–2	3–0	1–0	0–4	—	2–1
Zhodino-Yuzhnoye	0–2	2–2	2–3	0–4	1–2	2–3	4–1	5–1	4–1	1–1	2–0	3–3	3–0	1–0	1–2	0–0	—

Source: football.by
Legend: Blue = home team win; Yellow = draw; Red = away team win.

== See also ==
- 2023 Belarusian Premier League
- 2023–24 Belarusian Cup
