= Vadim Skripchenko =

Belarusian footballer (born 1975)

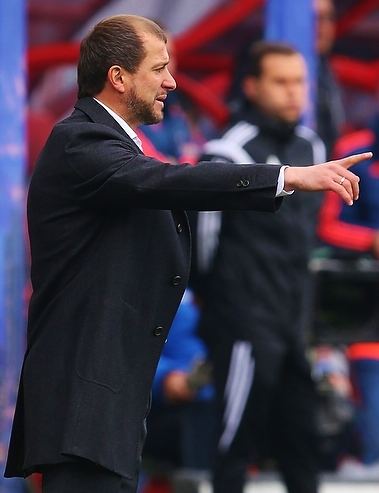
- Skripchenko coaching Ural Yekaterinburg in 2015

Personal information
- Full name: Vadim Viktorovich Skripchenko
- Date of birth: 26 November 1975 (age 50)
- Place of birth: Malaryta, Brest Oblast, Byelorussian SSR, Soviet Union
- Height: 1.74 m (5 ft 9 in)
- Positions: Defender; midfielder

Youth career
- 1991–1994: RUOR Minsk

Senior career*
Years	Team	Apps	(Gls)
1992	Dinamo-93 Minsk	7	(0)
1993	Traktor Minsk	4	(1)
1994–1997	Dinamo-93 Minsk	97	(11)
1998–1999	BATE Borisov	54	(4)
2000	CSKA Moscow	7	(0)
2000	→ BATE Borisov (loan)	17	(10)
2001	Uralan Elista	19	(0)
2002	BATE Borisov	22	(3)
2003	Shakhtyor Soligorsk	12	(2)
2004–2005	BATE Borisov	38	(3)
2006	Lokomotiv Vitebsk	20	(0)
2007	Savit Mogilev	11	(0)

International career
1995–1997	Belarus U21	19	(5)
1997–2000	Belarus	10	(2)

Managerial career
- 2008–2011: BATE Borisov (assistant)
- 2011–2013: Minsk
- 2013–2014: Kuban Krasnodar (assistant)
- 2015: Ural Yekaterinburg (assistant)
- 2015–2016: Ural Yekaterinburg
- 2016–2017: Krylia Sovetov Samara
- 2017–2018: Anzhi Makhachkala
- 2018: Ararat-Armenia
- 2019: Torpedo-BelAZ Zhodino
- 2020: Minsk
- 2021–2022: Minsk
- 2022–2025: Dinamo Minsk
- 2025: Sheriff Tiraspol
- 2026–: Dordoi Bishkek
- * Club domestic league appearances and goals

Vadim Viktorovich Skripchenko (Russian: Вадим Викторович Скрипченко; Belarusian: Вадзім Віктаравіч Скрыпчанка, romanized: Vadzim Viktaravič Skrypčanka; born 26 November 1975) is a Belarusian professional football coach and a former player.

== Playing career ==
Skripchenko made his professional debut in the Belarusian Premier League in 1993 for Dinamo-93 Minsk.

== Managerial career ==
In June 2015, Skripchenko was hired as an assistant manager with Ural Sverdlovsk Oblast. On 3 September 2015, he was hired as caretaker manager for Ural after the resignation of Viktor Goncharenko. He was appointed the permanent Ural manager on 22 September 2015. On 1 November 2016, he resigned as Ural manager.

On 3 November 2016, he was appointed the manager of Krylia Sovetov Samara. He was replaced as a manager of Krylia Sovetov after the club was relegated from the Russian Premier League at the end of the 2016–17 season.

On 14 August 2017, he was hired by Anzhi Makhachkala. Anzhi was relegated from the Russian Premier League at the end of the season after losing to Yenisey Krasnoyarsk in relegation play-offs and his contract was not extended.

On 3 June 2026, Dordoi Bishkek announced the appointment of Skripchenko as their new head coach.

== Honours ==
=== Player ===
Dinamo-93 Minsk

- Belarusian Cup: 1994–95

BATE Borisov

- Belarusian Premier League: 1999, 2002
- Belarusian Cup: 2005–06

=== Manager ===
Minsk

- Belarusian Cup: 2012–13

Dinamo Minsk

- Belarusian Premier League: 2023, 2024
- Belarusian Super Cup: 2025
