= Vadim Pigas =

Belarusian footballer

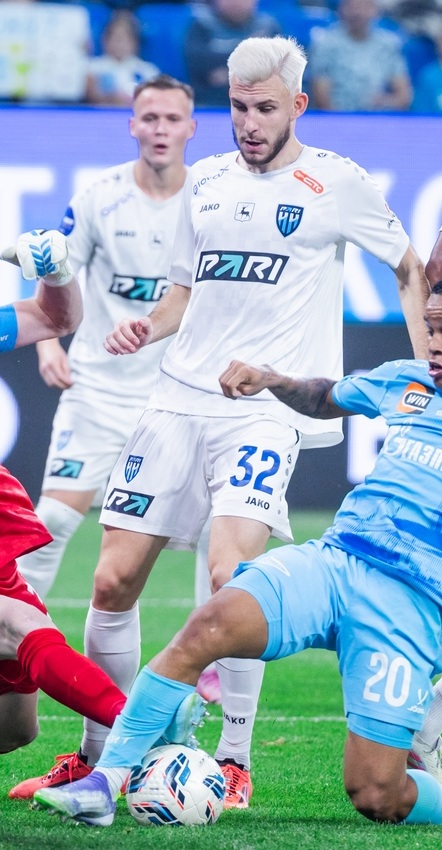
- Pigas with Pari Nizhny Novgorod in 2025

Personal information
- Date of birth: 8 August 2001 (age 25)
- Place of birth: Minsk, Belarus
- Height: 1.81 m (5 ft 11 in)
- Positions: Right back; left back

Team information
- Current team: Pari Nizhny Novgorod
- Number: 32

Youth career
- 2018–2020: BATE Borisov

Senior career*
Years	Team	Apps	(Gls)
2021–2023	Isloch Minsk Raion	72	(4)
2024–2025	Dinamo Minsk	39	(3)
2025–	Pari Nizhny Novgorod	12	(0)

International career^{‡}
2018	Belarus U19		
2024–	Belarus	9	(1)
- * Club domestic league appearances and goals as of 18 April 2026 ‡ National team caps and goals as of 12 October 2025

Vadim Pigas (Belarusian: Вадзім Пігас; Russian: Вадим Пигас; born 8 August 2001) is a Belarusian professional footballer who plays as a right back or left back for Russian club Pari Nizhny Novgorod and the Belarus national team.

== Club career ==
On 15 August 2025, Pigas signed a three-year contract with Russian Premier League club Pari Nizhny Novgorod.

== Career statistics ==
=== Club ===
As of 18 April 2026

Club	Season	League			Cup		Continental		Other		Total	
Club	Season	Division	Apps	Goals	Apps	Goals	Apps	Goals	Apps	Goals	Apps	Goals
Isloch Minsk Raion	2021	Belarusian Premier League	18	0	1	0	–		–		19	0
Isloch Minsk Raion	2022	Belarusian Premier League	28	1	2	0	–		–		30	1
Isloch Minsk Raion	2023	Belarusian Premier League	26	3	2	0	–		–		28	3
Isloch Minsk Raion	Total		72	4	5	0	0	0	0	0	77	4
Dinamo Minsk	2024	Belarusian Premier League	24	2	5	0	13 (Note: Three appearances in UEFA Champions League, 4 appearances in UEFA Europa League, six appearances in UEFA Conference League)	0	1 (Note: Appearances in Belarusian Super Cup)	0	43	2
Dinamo Minsk	2025	Belarusian Premier League	15	1	1	0	4 (Note: Two appearances in UEFA Champions League, two appearances in UEFA Conference League)	0	1	0	21	1
Dinamo Minsk	Total		39	3	6	0	17	0	2	0	64	3
Pari Nizhny Novgorod	2025–26	Russian Premier League	12	0	4	0	–		–		16	0
Career total			123	7	15	0	17	0	2	0	157	7

=== International ===
As of match played 12 October 2025

Appearances and goals by national team and year
National team	Year	Apps	Goals
Belarus
Belarus	2024	2	0
Belarus	2025	7	1
Total		9	1

==== International goals ====
No.	Date	Venue	Opponent	Score	Result	Competition
1	10 June 2025	Dinamo Stadium, Minsk, Belarus	Russia	1–4	1–4	Friendly

== Honours ==
Dinamo Minsk

- Belarusian Premier League: 2024
- Belarusian Super Cup: 2025
