= 2022 Belarusian First League =

Belarusian First League
- Season: 2022
- Champions: Naftan Novopolotsk
- Promoted: Naftan Novopolotsk; Smorgon; Rogachev
- Matches: 144
- Goals: 508 (3.53 per match)
- Top goalscorer: Maksim Kovalevich; Yury Kazlow (13 goals each)

The 2022 Belarusian First League is the 32nd season of second tier football in Belarus. It started in April and ended in November 2022.

== Team changes from 2021 season ==
Two best teams of 2021 Belarusian First League (Arsenal Dzerzhinsk and Belshina Bobruisk) were promoted to Belarusian Premier League. They were replaced by 15th-placed team of 2021 Belarusian Premier League (Smorgon). 16th-placed Premier League team Sputnik Rechitsa disbanded, leaving a vacancy in the First League.

Due to low number of participants, no team has relegated to the Second League. In attempt to bring the number of teams to 16, 5 best teams were initially promoted from the Second League (Ostrovets, Rogachev, Partizan Soligorsk, Osipovichi and BGU Minsk). After Partizan Soligorsk and BGU Minsk refused promotion due to insufficient financing, promotion was offered to Molodechno and Malorita.

In the following months before the start of the season, Dnepr Mogilev was promoted to Premier League to replace Rukh Brest (who withdrew from the league due to international sanctions against its owners), Krumkachy Minsk were denied First League license and withdrew to the Second League for upcoming season, while Malorita stepped down from their initially accepted promotion and returned to the Second League due to financial reasons. Extra promotion spot was offered to Bumprom Gomel, but the team declined. Thus the number of participants was finalized at 13.

== Teams summary ==
Location of teams in 2022 Belarusian First League

Team	Location	Position in 2021
Smorgon	Smorgon	Premier League, 15
Volna Pinsk	Pinsk	4
Lokomotiv Gomel	Gomel	6
Shakhtyor Petrikov	Petrikov	7
Naftan Novopolotsk	Novopolotsk	8
Orsha	Orsha	9
Baranovichi	Baranovichi	10
Lida	Lida	11
Slonim-2017	Slonim	12
Ostrovets	Ostrovets	Second League, 1
Rogachev	Rogachev	Second League, 2
Osipovichi	Osipovichi	Second League, 4
Molodechno	Molodechno	Second League, 9

== League table ==
Pos	Team	Pld	W	D	L	GF	GA	GD	Pts	Promotion or relegation
1	Naftan Novopolotsk (P)	24	16	5	3	55	19	+36	53	Promotion to the Belarusian Premier League
2	Smorgon (P)	24	16	4	4	46	27	+19	52	Promotion to the Belarusian Premier League
3	Shakhtyor Petrikov (Note: Farm club cannot be promoted)	24	13	6	5	69	20	+49	45	
4	Rogachev (O)	24	12	5	7	45	34	+11	41	Advance to the promotion play-offs
5	Ostrovets	24	11	7	6	42	34	+8	40	
6	Lokomotiv Gomel	24	10	9	5	39	24	+15	39	
7	Volna Pinsk	24	10	6	8	44	35	+9	36	
8	Molodechno	24	7	8	9	30	45	−15	29	
9	Orsha	24	7	6	11	33	52	−19	27	
10	Lida	24	6	8	10	35	43	−8	26	
11	Slonim-2017	24	5	3	16	24	53	−29	18	
12	Osipovichi	24	3	4	17	21	53	−32	13	
13	Baranovichi	24	3	3	18	25	69	−44	12	

Updated to match(es) played on 12 November 2022. Source: football.by
Rules for classification: 1) Points; 2) Head-to-head points; 3) Head-to-head goal difference; 4) Head-to-head goals scored; 5) Goal difference; 6) Matches won; 7) Goals scored.
(O) Play-off winners; (P) Promoted

== Results ==
Home \ Away	BAR	LID	LGM	MOL	NAF	ORS	OSI	OST	ROG	SHP	SLO	SMR	VOL
Baranovichi		1–6	0–5	3–3	0–4	2–1	0–3	0–1	0–1	1–5	2–6	2–4	1–1
Lida	5–2		0–1	1–1	0–3	1–2	1–1	0–0	4–2	2–1	1–0	1–3	1–0
Lokomotiv Gomel	5–0	2–1		1–1	0–1	2–0	2–2	3–3	2–1	0–0	3–2	4–1	1–2
Molodechno	3–0	2–0	0–0		3–5	2–1	2–1	0–0	1–4	0–3	1–1	0–0	2–1
Naftan Novopolotsk	2–1	2–2	3–2	3–1		5–0	4–0	3–0	2–3	1–1	1–0	2–0	0–1
Orsha	3–1	2–2	0–0	1–2	1–0		3–2	1–3	1–0	1–9	4–0	1–1	2–2
Osipovichi	0–3	1–1	0–2	4–1	1–2	0–0		0–1	0–3	0–4	0–2	0–4	0–1
Ostrovets	2–0	4–0	1–2	3–0	1–1	2–0	3–1		0–5	0–4	3–0	2–3	3–2
Rogachev	4–2	3–3	0–0	0–2	0–4	2–2	1–0	2–2		1–0	3–1	3–1	3–1
Shakhtyor Petrikov	0–0	4–1	3–0	6–0	2–2	6–0	4–2	4–2	0–0		2–3	4–0	1–2
Slonim-2017	0–4	2–0	0–0	2–2	0–2	3–2	0–2	0–3	0–1	0–5		1–3	1–3
Smorgon	3–0	2–0	2–1	3–1	0–0	3–2	1–0	1–1	3–1	1–0	2–0		2–0
Volna Pinsk	2–0	2–2	1–1	2–0	0–3	2–3	8–1	2–2	3–2	1–1	4–0	1–3	

Updated to match(es) played on 12 November 2022. Source: football.by
Legend: Blue = home team win; Yellow = draw; Red = away team win.

== Top goalscorers ==
Rank	Goalscorer	Team	Goals
1	(Belarus) Maksim Kovalevich	Shakhtyor Petrikov	13
1	(Belarus) Yury Kazlow	Naftan Novopolotsk	13
3	(Russia) Yegor Kortsov	Rogachev	12
4	(Belarus) Kirill Zabelin	Lida	11
4	(Belarus) Ilya Trachynski	Rogachev	11
4	(Belarus) Vladislav Kabachevskiy	Orsha	11
4	(Belarus) Denis Kovalevich	Shakhtyor Petrikov	11

Updated to games played on 12 November 2022
Source: football.by

== See also ==
- 2022 Belarusian Premier League
- 2021–22 Belarusian Cup
- 2022–23 Belarusian Cup
