= Yevgeniy Apanasovich =

Belarusian footballer

Personal information
- Date of birth: 18 July 2002 (age 24)
- Place of birth: Luninets, Brest Oblast, Belarus
- Position: Forward

Team information
- Current team: Ostrovets
- Number: 18

Youth career
- 2019–2020: Slutsk

Senior career*
Years	Team	Apps	(Gls)
2020–2023	Slutsk	5	(0)
2021	→ Lokomotiv Gomel (loan)	11	(1)
2023	→ Maxline (loan)	4	(0)
2023	Luninets	6	(8)
2024–	Ostrovets	1	(0)
- * Club domestic league appearances and goals as of 11 December 2024

Yevgeniy Apanasovich (Belarusian: Яўген Апанасовіч; Russian: Евгений Апанасович; born 18 July 2002) is a Belarusian professional footballer who plays for Ostrovets.
