= 2024–25 Belarusian Cup =

Tournament details
- Country: Belarus
- Dates: 11 May 2024 – 24 May 2025

Final positions
- Champions: Neman Grodno
- Runners-up: Torpedo-BelAZ Zhodino

The 2024–25 Belarusian Cup was the 34th season of Belarus's annual knock-out cup football competition. The winners qualified for the 2025–26 Conference League first qualifying round.

Defending cup holders Neman Grodno retained the cup on 24 May 2025 (their third Belarusian Cup win), defeating Torpedo-BelAZ Zhodino 3–0 in the final. Since they qualified for the Conference League based on league position, the spot for winning the cup was passed to the fourth-placed team of the 2024 Belarusian Premier League.

== First round ==
The draw was made on 6 May 2024. 2 media clubs (D-Media and Inform) participated in this round.

Teams were split into six regions:

- Brest Region
- Vitebsk Region
- Gomel Region
- Grodno Region
- Minsk
- Mogilev Region

The matches were played on 11–12 May 2024.

=== Brest Region ===
Team 1	Score	Team 2
11 May 2024
DYuSSh Ivatsevichi	8–3	Kommunalnik
Krechet Bereza	1–0	Agro-Pelishche
12 May 2024
Atlant	3–0	Nadezhda Baranovichi
Novaya Pripyat	5–2	Lyakhaviyski Volat

=== Vitebsk Region ===
Team 1	Score	Team 2
11 May 2024
Polotsk-2019	2–0	Inform
Gazovik Vitebsk	2–3	Miory

=== Gomel Region ===
Team 1	Score	Team 2
11 May 2024
MNPZ Mozyr	3–4 (a.e.t.)	Leskhoz Gomel

=== Grodno Region ===
Team 1	Score	Team 2
14 May 2024
Svisloch	2–1	Slonim City

=== Minsk ===
Torpedo Minsk did not show up for the game against Traktor Minsk, who were awarded a walkover and advanced directly to the second round.

Team 1	Score	Team 2
11 May 2024
Torpedo Minsk	0–3 w/o	Traktor Minsk
BGU Minsk	0–3	Uni Minsk
Bobovnya	0–1	Kletsk
Energetik	3–2 (a.e.t.)	Kolos Cherven
12 May 2024
Urozhaynaya	3–7	D-Media

=== Mogilev Region ===
Team 1	Score	Team 2
11 May 2024
Drut Belynichi	2–1	Gorki
Tekhnolog-BGUT Mogilev	3–0 w/o	FSK Kirovsk

== Second round ==
The draw was made on 15 May 2024. The matches were held on May 22–23 and 29–30.

Team 1	Score	Team 2
22 May 2024
Svisloch	0–8	Baranovichi
D-Media	4–3 (a.e.t.)	Ostrovets
Kletsk	0–6	Orsha
Uni Minsk	2–1	Partizan Soligorsk
23 May 2024
Miory	2–1 (a.e.t.)	Osipovichi
29 May 2024
Krechet Bereza	1–8	Maxline Vitebsk
Polotsk-2019	0–14	Niva Dolbizno
Leskhoz Gomel	1–5	Lokomotiv Gomel
Stenles Pinsk	2–3	Molodechno-2018
DYuSSh Ivatsevichi	0–6	Belshina Bobruisk
Traktor Minsk	2–2 (7–8 p)	Lida
30 May 2024
Novaya Pripyat	1–3	Krumkachy Minsk
Tekhnolog-BGUT Mogilev	0–2	Bumprom Gomel
Energetik	1–2 (a.e.t.)	Slonim-2017
Drut Belynichi	1–1 (4–5 p)	Energetik-BGU Minsk
Atlant	2–3	Volna Pinsk

== Round of 32 ==
The 16 second round winners and the 16 teams from the 2024 Belarusian Premier League entered the Round of 32. The draw was made on 3 June 2024. The matches took place on June 18-20 and July 12-14.

Team 1	Score	Team 2
18 June 2024
Lokomotiv Gomel	0–5	Isloch Minsk Raion
Molodechno-2018	0–2	Torpedo-BelAZ Zhodino
19 June 2024
Miory	0–8	Dinamo Minsk
Uni Minsk	0–2 (a.e.t.)	Neman Grodno
12 July 2024
Belshina Bobruisk	3–1	Minsk
Slonim-2017	0–2	Dynamo Brest
13 July 2024
Baranovichi	0–1	Smorgon
D-Media	0–5	BATE Borisov
Lida	0–2	Vitebsk
Energetik-BGU Minsk	0–5	Slutsk
Bumprom Gomel	0–6	Slavia Mozyr
14 July 2024
Orsha	0–3	Arsenal Dzerzhinsk
Maxline Vitebsk	2–1 (a.e.t.)	Naftan Novopolotsk
Niva Dolbizno	1–3	Gomel
Krumkachy Minsk	0–1	Dnepr Mogilev
Volna Pinsk	1–0	Shakhtyor Soligorsk

== Round of 16 ==
The 16 Round of 32 winners entered the Round of 16. The draw was made on 16 July 2024. The matches were played on July 26 and 28 2024, and 1 March 2025.

Team 1	Score	Team 2
26 July 2024
Smorgon	1–2	Belshina Bobruisk
Gomel	1–2	Vitebsk
27 July 2024
Volna Pinsk	0–3	Slutsk
Slavia Mozyr	0–2 (a.e.t.)	Maxline Vitebsk
28 July 2024
Dynamo Brest	4–1	Arsenal Dzerzhinsk
Dnepr Mogilev	0–1	Isloch Minsk Raion
BATE Borisov	0–2	Torpedo-BelAZ Zhodino
1 March 2025
Dinamo Minsk	0–2	Neman Grodno

== Quarter-finals ==
The eight Round of 16 winners entered the quarter-finals, held over two legs. The first legs were held on 2 and 5 March 2025, followed by the second legs on 8 and 9 March 2025.

Team 1	Agg.	Team 2	1st leg	2nd leg
Dynamo Brest	0–1	Torpedo-BelAZ Zhodino	0–0	0–1
Belshina Bobruisk	1–8	Maxline Vitebsk	1–2	0–6
Vitebsk	2–0	Slutsk	2–0	0–0
Neman Grodno	0–0 (4–2 p)	Isloch Minsk Raion	0–0	0–0 (a.e.t.)

== Semi-finals ==
The four quarter-final winners entered the semi-finals, held over two legs. The first legs were held on 15 and 16 April 2025, followed by the second legs on 7 and 8 May 2025.

Team 1	Agg.	Team 2	1st leg	2nd leg
Neman Grodno	3–1	Vitebsk	3–0	0–1
Torpedo-BelAZ Zhodino	1–0	Maxline Vitebsk	0–0	1–0

== Final ==
The final was held between the two semi-final winners.

24 May 2025
16:00 UTC+3

Neman Grodno	3–0	Torpedo-BelAZ Zhodino
Sadownichy 55'; Pushnyakov 59'; Zubovich 80'	Report

Neman Stadium, Grodno
Attendance: 8,311
Referee: Dmitry Markov
