= Ode Abdullahi =

Nigerian footballer (born 2002)

Personal information
- Full name: Ode Usman Abdullahi
- Date of birth: 28 September 2002 (age 24)
- Place of birth: Abuja, Nigeria
- Height: 1.82 m (6 ft 0 in)
- Position: Midfielder

Team information
- Current team: Maxline Vitebsk
- Number: 4

Senior career*
Years	Team	Apps	(Gls)
2023–2024	Dainava	69	(2)
2025	Aris Limassol	0	(0)
2025	→ Maxline Vitebsk (loan)	29	(3)
2026–	Maxline Vitebsk	13	(1)
- * Club domestic league appearances and goals as of 4 July 2026

Ode Usman Abdullahi (born 28 September 2002) is a Nigerian professional footballer who plays as a midfielder for Belarusian Premier League club Maxline Vitebsk.

== Club career ==
=== DFK Dainava ===
At the beginning of 2023, Abdullahi joined the Lithuanian club DFK Dainava. He made his debut for the club on 4 March 2023, in a match against Hegelmann, coming on the field in the starting lineup. He scored his first goal for the club on 2 September 2023, in a match against Džiugas, providing an assist. Abdullahi played as a key player throughout the season, continuing to play for Dainava at the beginning of 2024. He scored his debut goal for the club on 31 March 2024, in a match against Sūduva. Abdullahi also received awards as the best player of the month. At the end of 2024, he left the club upon the expiration of his contract. Over the course of 2 seasons, he managed to score 2 goals and 4 assists for the club in the A Lyga.

=== Maxline Vitebsk ===
At the end of January 2025, Abdullahi joined Aris Limassol as a free agent, signing a three-year contract and moving to Belarusian club Maxline Vitebsk on loan. He made his debut for the club on 2 March 2025 in the quarter-final match of the Belarusian Cup against Belshina Babruisk, entering the field in the starting lineup. He played his debut match in the Belarusian Premier League on 16 March 2025 against the club Slutsk. In the semi-final matches of the Belarusian Cup, together with Maxline Vitebsk, they lost to Torpedo-BelAZ Zhodino on aggregate, eliminating them in the tournament. Abdullahi scored his debut goal for the club on 12 May 2025 in a match against Slavia Mozyr. At the end of the season, he and the club became the league champions.

In January 2026, Abdullahi officially joined Maxline Vitebsk as a free agent, signing a two-year contract. He started the new season on 28 February 2026 with a match for the Belarusian Super Cup, where they lost to Neman Grodno in a penalty shootout. In the quarter-final matches of the Belarusian Cup, they defeated Dynamo Brest, advancing to the semi-finals of the tournament.

== Honours ==
Maxline Vitebsk

- Belarusian Premier League champion: 2025
