= Yegor Karpitsky =

Belarusian footballer (born 2003)

Personal information
- Full name: Yegor Aleksandrovich Karpitsky
- Date of birth: 27 November 2003 (age 22)
- Place of birth: Vitebsk, Belarus
- Height: 1.88 m (6 ft 2 in)
- Position: Forward

Team information
- Current team: Dnepr Mogilev (on loan from Krylia Sovetov Samara)
- Number: 21

Youth career
- 2017–2021: Shakhtyor Soligorsk

Senior career*
Years	Team	Apps	(Gls)
2021–2023	Shakhtyor Soligorsk	32	(15)
2022	→ Shakhtyor Petrikov (loan)	8	(10)
2023–	Krylia Sovetov Samara	10	(1)
2024	→ Krylia Sovetov-2 Samara	11	(3)
2024–2025	→ Sokol Saratov (loan)	27	(2)
2025–	→ Krylia Sovetov-2 Samara	11	(3)
2026–	→ Dnepr Mogilev (loan)	12	(1)

International career^{‡}
2021	Belarus U19	3	(0)
2022–2024	Belarus U21	15	(4)
2023–2024	Belarus	3	(0)
- * Club domestic league appearances and goals as of 3 July 2026 ‡ National team caps and goals as of 15 October 2024

Yegor Aleksandrovich Karpitsky (Belarusian: Ягор Аляксандравіч Карпіцкі; Russian: Егор Александрович Карпицкий; born 27 November 2003) is a Belarusian professional footballer who plays as a forward for Dnepr Mogilev on loan from Russian club Krylia Sovetov Samara, and the Belarus national team.

== Club career ==
On 15 July 2023, Karpitsky joined Russian Premier League club Krylia Sovetov Samara on a four-year contract. On 3 July 2024, Karpitsky moved on loan to Sokol Saratov. On 28 January 2025, Krylia Sovetov terminated the loan early. On 19 February 2025, Karpitsky returned to Sokol on loan until the end of the 2024–25 season.

On 21 January 2026, Karpitsky joined Dnepr Mogilev on loan.

== Career statistics ==
=== Club ===
As of match played 19 October 2025

Appearances and goals by club, season and competition
Club	Season	League			Cup		Continental		Other		Total	
Club	Season	Division	Apps	Goals	Apps	Goals	Apps	Goals	Apps	Goals	Apps	Goals
Shakhtyor Soligorsk	2021	Belarusian Premier League	3	0	1	1	—		0	0	4	1
Shakhtyor Soligorsk	2022	Belarusian Premier League	15	2	3	0	0	0	0	0	18	2
Shakhtyor Soligorsk	2023	Belarusian Premier League	13	12	0	0	0	0	0	0	13	12
Shakhtyor Soligorsk	Total		31	14	4	1	0	0	0	0	35	15
Shakhter-Petrikov	2022	Belarusian First League	8	10	—		—		—		8	10
Krylia Sovetov Samara	2023–24	Russian Premier League	10	1	4	0	—		—		14	1
Krylia Sovetov-2 Samara	2024	Russian Second League B	11	3	—		—		—		11	3
Krylia Sovetov-2 Samara	2025	Russian Second League B	11	3	—		—		—		11	3
Krylia Sovetov-2 Samara	Total		22	6	0	0	0	0	0	0	22	6
Sokol Saratov (loan)	2024–25	Russian First League	27	2	—		—		—		27	2
Career total			98	33	8	1	0	0	0	0	106	34

== Honors ==
Shakhtyor Soligorsk

- Belarusian Premier League: 2021
- Belarusian Super Cup: 2023
