= 2024 Belarusian Premier League =

Belarusian Premier League
- Season: 2024
- Dates: 14 March 2024–7 December 2024
- Champions: Dinamo Minsk; 9th Premier League title
- Relegated: Dnepr Mogilev; Shakhtyor Soligorsk
- Champions League: Dinamo Minsk
- Conference League: Dynamo Brest; Neman Grodno; Torpedo-BelAZ Zhodino
- Matches: 104
- Goals: 244 (2.35 per match)
- Top goalscorer: Rody Effaghe (17 goals)
- Biggest home win: BATE Borisov 6–0 Slutsk (31 May 2024)
- Biggest away win: Slutsk 0–5 Dinamo Minsk (15 June 2024)
- Highest scoring: Dynamo Brest 6–1 Dnepr Mogilev (15 June 2024)
- Longest winning run: 4 matches Torpedo-BelAZ Zhodino; Neman Grodno; Slavia Mozyr
- Longest unbeaten run: 13 matches Dinamo Minsk
- Longest winless run: 13 matches Minsk
- Longest losing run: 7 matches Shakhtyor Soligorsk
- All statistics correct as of 23 June 2024.

The 2024 Belarusian Premier League (also written as Belarusbank Vyšejšaja Liha for sponsorship reasons) was the 34th season of top-tier football in Belarus.

Dinamo Minsk successfully defended their title, winning for the second time in a row.

== Teams ==
The league consisted of sixteen teams; the top thirteen teams from the previous season, and three teams promoted from the 2023 Belarusian First League. Dinamo Minsk entered the season as defending champions.

Arsenal Dzerzhinsk and Dnepr Mogilev were promoted as champions and runners-up of the 2023 First League (replacing the bottom-placed Premier League team Belshina Bobruisk). Third-placed First League team Vitebsk defeated the second-bottom Premier League team Energetik-BGU Minsk in the 2023 Belarusian Premier League play-off, taking their place in the league.

Team	Location	Venue	Capacity	Position in 2023
Arsenal Dzerzhinsk	Dzerzhinsk	City Stadium	1,000	1st (First League)
BATE Borisov	Borisov	Borisov Arena	13,126	5th
Dynamo Brest	Brest	OSK Brestsky	10,169	10th
Dinamo Minsk	Minsk	Dinamo Stadium	22,000	1st
Dnepr Mogilev	Mogilev	Spartak Stadium	7,350	2nd (First League)
Gomel	Gomel	Central Stadium	14,307	6th
Isloch Minsk Raion	Minsk	FC Minsk Stadium	3,000	4th
Minsk	Minsk	FC Minsk Stadium	3,000	9th
Naftan Novopolotsk	Novopolotsk	Atlant Stadium	5,300	12th
Neman Grodno	Grodno	Neman Stadium	8,479	2nd
Shakhtyor Soligorsk	Soligorsk	Stroitel Stadium	4,200	13th
Slavia Mozyr	Mozyr	Yunost Stadium	5,300	7th
Slutsk	Slutsk	City Stadium	1,896	8th
Smorgon	Smorgon	Yunost Stadium	3,200	11th
Torpedo-BelAZ Zhodino	Zhodino	Torpedo Stadium	6,524	3rd
Vitebsk	Vitebsk	Vitebsky CSK	8,144	3rd (First League)

Locations of the 2024 Belarusian Premier League teams

== League table ==
Pos	Team	Pld	W	D	L	GF	GA	GD	Pts	Qualification or relegation
1	Dinamo Minsk (C)	30	20	8	2	50	13	+37	68	Qualification for the Champions League first qualifying round
2	Neman Grodno	30	20	5	5	45	19	+26	65	Qualification for the Conference League first qualifying round (Note: The 2024–25 Belarusian Cup winners qualified for the Conference League first qualifying round. Since the cup winners (Neman Grodno) qualified based on league position, the Conference League spot was passed to the fourth-placed team.)
3	Torpedo-BelAZ Zhodino	30	18	8	4	45	21	+24	62	Qualification for the Conference League first qualifying round
4	Dynamo Brest	30	14	7	9	62	37	+25	49	Qualification for the Conference League first qualifying round
5	Vitebsk	30	14	5	11	33	25	+8	47	
6	Gomel	30	11	11	8	37	28	+9	44	
7	Isloch Minsk Raion	30	11	8	11	36	30	+6	41	
8	BATE Borisov	30	11	7	12	38	38	0	40	
9	Slutsk	30	11	6	13	26	41	−15	39	
10	Arsenal Dzerzhinsk	30	10	8	12	29	36	−7	38	
11	Slavia Mozyr	30	8	11	11	28	33	−5	35	
12	Smorgon	30	7	11	12	33	51	−18	32	
13	Minsk	30	6	10	14	28	44	−16	28	
14	Naftan Novopolotsk (O)	30	5	11	14	27	44	−17	26	Qualification for the Belarusian Premier League play-off
15	Dnepr Mogilev (R)	30	3	9	18	27	58	−31	18	Relegation to the Belarusian First League
16	Shakhtyor Soligorsk (Note: After the season, Shakhtyor Soligorsk folded after being excluded due to financial issues.) (D, R)	30	5	7	18	19	45	−26	2 (Note: Shakhtyor Soligorsk were deducted 20 points for match-fixing.)	Excluded, club folded at the end of the season

Source: Soccerway
Rules for classification: 1) Points; 2) Head-to-head points; 3) Head-to-head goal difference; 4) Head-to-head goals scored; 5) Goal difference; 6) Matches won; 7) Goals scored.
(C) Champions; (D) Disqualified; (O) Play-off winners; (R) Relegated

== Results ==
Each team plays home-and-away once against every other team for a total of 30 matches played each.

Home \ Away	ARS	BAT	DBR	DMI	DNE	GOM	ISL	FCM	NAF	NEM	SHA	SLA	SLU	SMR	TZH	VIT
Arsenal Dzerzhinsk	—	2–0	0–2	1–2	3–1	1–0	3–1	0–0	0–3	0–4	2–0	1–1	1–0	2–0	0–1	1–1
BATE Borisov	3–2	—	3–1	0–2	1–1	1–3	1–1	0–1	1–1	0–3	1–1	1–0	6–0	7–4	1–2	1–0
Dynamo Brest	2–1	2–0	—	1–1	6–1	1–1	3–2	3–0	2–2	2–2	3–0	3–0	1–2	4–1	0–1	1–1
Dinamo Minsk	2–0	1–0	1–0	—	2–0	2–0	2–0	2–0	2–2	2–1	3–2	2–0	2–0	5–0	0–0	1–1
Dnepr Mogilev	0–0	1–1	0–3	0–2	—	0–1	1–3	1–1	0–3	0–2	2–3	1–2	2–3	2–1	1–1	1–2
Gomel	5–0	2–0	2–1	0–1	1–1	—	0–0	2–0	2–1	2–3	1–2	0–0	1–2	2–1	0–0	0–0
Isloch Minsk Raion	0–2	1–2	1–1	0–1	1–1	1–0	—	3–0	3–0	2–0	0–0	0–0	0–0	3–2	0–1	1–0
Minsk	1–2	0–1	3–2	0–0	2–2	3–1	3–2	—	1–1	0–2	0–0	1–1	0–1	2–3	1–2	1–2
Naftan Novopolotsk	0–0	0–0	3–6	1–2	2–1	0–2	2–1	0–2	—	0–0	0–0	0–1	1–4	1–1	1–1	0–4
Neman Grodno	1–0	1–0	2–0	0–0	3–1	1–1	0–3	4–0	2–1	—	1–0	1–0	2–0	2–1	1–0	0–1
Shakhtyor Soligorsk	0–3	1–3	0–4	0–3	1–2	1–2	0–1	0–1	0–0	0–1	—	1–3	1–2	2–2	1–0	1–0
Slavia Mozyr	3–0	2–3	1–1	1–1	2–0	0–0	2–1	1–1	1–0	0–1	0–1	—	0–0	0–0	0–2	1–2
Slutsk	1–1	0–1	1–4	0–5	0–1	1–1	1–3	1–0	0–1	2–0	0–0	1–0	—	0–0	1–0	2–0
Smorgon	1–0	0–0	0–2	1–0	0–0	2–2	1–1	1–1	1–0	0–0	2–0	3–3	4–1	—	0–4	0–3
Torpedo-BelAZ Zhodino	1–1	2–0	3–1	1–1	4–2	2–2	1–0	2–2	2–1	1–4	1–0	3–0	1–0	2–0	—	3–0
Vitebsk	0–0	1–0	2–0	1–0	2–1	0–1	0–1	2–1	2–0	0–1	2–1	2–3	2–0	0–1	0–1	—

Source: Soccerway
Legend: Blue = home team win; Yellow = draw; Red = away team win.

== Belarusian Premier League play-off ==
The fourteenth-placed team (Naftan Novopolotsk) faced the third-placed team of the 2024 Belarusian First League (Niva Dolbizno) in a two-legged play-off for the final place in the 2025 Belarusian Premier League.

=== First leg ===
4 December 2024	Niva Dolbizno	1–3	Naftan Novopolotsk	Dolbizno
12:00 BST	Yushchenko 31'		Pranovich 4'; Paparyha 40' (pen.), 59' (pen.)	Stadium: City Stadium

=== Second leg ===
7 December 2024	Naftan Novopolotsk	2–0 (5–1 agg.)	Niva Dolbizno	Novopolotsk
11:00 BST	Paparyha 55'; Suchkow 85'			Stadium: Atlant Stadium

== Season statistics ==
=== Top scorers ===
As of 1 December 2024

Rank	Player	Club	Goals
1	(Gabonese Football Federation) Junior Effaghe	Gomel	17
2	(Russian Football Union) Yegor Kortsov	Dynamo Brest	15
2	(Football Federation of Belarus) Maksim Skavysh	Torpedo-BelAZ Zhodino	15
4	(Football Federation of Belarus) Pavel Savitsky	Neman Grodno	14
5	(Football Federation of Belarus) Mikhail Gordeychuk	Dynamo Brest	13
6	(Football Federation of Belarus) Aleksandr Shestyuk	Isloch Minsk Raion	11
7	(Football Federation of Belarus) German Barkovsky	Dynamo Brest	9
7	(Ukrainian Association of Football) Roman Paparyha	Naftan Novopolotsk	9
7	(Kazakhstan Football Federation) Oralkhan Omirtayev	BATE Borisov	9
7	(Football Federation of Belarus) Karen Vardanyan	Vitebsk	9

=== Own goals ===
- (Belarus) Nikita Krasnov - Slavia Mozyr vs Dnepr Mogilev (15 March 2023)
- (Belarus) Aleksandr Chizh - Vitebsk vs Slavia Mozyr (30 March 2023)
- (Belarus) Vladislav Lozhkin - Shakhtyor Soligorsk vs Slavia Mozyr (14 April 2023)
- (Democratic Republic of the Congo) Mydo Kingu Yallet - Minsk vs Naftan Novopolotsk (20 April 2023)
- (Belarus) Dmitry Aliseyko - Dnepr Mogilev vs Dinamo Minsk (27 April 2023)
- (Belarus) Aleksandr Svirskiy - Isloch Minsk Raion vs Dinamo Minsk (12 May 2023)
- (Belarus) Fedor Yurkevich - Naftan Novopolotsk vs Dnepr Mogilev (18 May 2023)
- (Belarus) Aleksandr Mikhalenko - Minsk vs Vitebsk (18 May 2023)
- (Belarus) Artyom Bykov - Dinamo Minsk vs Shakhtyor Soligorsk (19 May 2023)
- (Belarus) Stanislav Atrashkevich - Arsenal Dzerzhinsk vs Dinamo Minsk (1 June 2023)

=== Clean sheets ===
As of match played 1 June 2024

Rank	Player	Club	Clean sheets
1	(Football Federation of Belarus) Fedor Lapoukhov	Dinamo Minsk	6
1	(Football Federation of Belarus) Yevgeniy Abramovich	Torpedo-BelAZ Zhodino	6
1	(Football Federation of Belarus) Maksim Belov	Neman Grodno	6
4	(Football Federation of Belarus) Ivan Sanko	Arsenal Dzerzhinsk	4
4	(Football Federation of Belarus) Dzmitry Kharytonaw	Vitebsk	4
4	(Football Federation of Belarus) Stanislav Kleschuk	Gomel	4
7	(Russian Football Union) Yegor Generalov	Dnepr Mogilev	3
7	(Football Federation of Belarus) Mikhail Kozakevich	Dynamo Brest	3
7	(Football Federation of Belarus) Aleksandr Svirskiy	Isloch Minsk Raion	3
10	(Football Federation of Belarus) Uladzislaw Ihnatsyew	BATE Borisov	2
10	(Football Federation of Belarus) Syarhey Chernik	Shakhtyor Soligorsk	2
10	(Football Federation of Belarus) Timofey Yurasov	Torpedo-BelAZ Zhodino	2
10	(Football Federation of Belarus) Ivan Novichkov	Smorgon	2
10	(Football Federation of Belarus) Arseniy Skopets	BATE Borisov	2
15	(Football Federation of Belarus) Artyom Soroko	Slavia Mozyr	1
15	(Football Federation of Belarus) Aleksey Kharitonovich	Naftan Novopolotsk	1
15	(Football Federation of Belarus) Maksim Azarko	Minsk	1
15	(Russian Football Union) Aleksei Kozlov	Slavia Mozyr	1
15	(Football Federation of Belarus) Denis Sadovsky	Slutsk	1
15	(Football Federation of Belarus) Ilya Branovets	Slutsk	1
15	(Football Federation of Belarus) Maksim Plotnikov	Arsenal Dzerzhinsk	1
15	(Football Federation of Belarus) Stanislav Boldysh	Minsk	1
15	(Football Federation of Belarus) Sergey Ignatovich	Shakhtyor Soligorsk	1

Timofey Yurasov & Yevgeniy Abramovich both played in Torpedo-BelAZ Zhodino's 1-0 victory over Slutsk on 31 March

=== Discipline ===
==== Red cards ====
As of match played 1 June 2024

- (Belarus) Mikhail Bashilov - Shakhtyor Soligorsk vs Vitebsk (17 March 2024)
- (Belarus) Aleksandr Mikhalenko - Minsk vs Smorgon (5 April 2024)
- (Belarus) Matvey Svidinskiy - BATE Borisov vs Gomel (6 April 2024)
- (Belarus) Anton Lukashov - Dnepr Mogilev vs Neman Grodno (13 April 2024)
- (Belarus) Yevgeny Malashevich - Dynamo Brest vs Minsk (14 April 2024)
- (Russia) Yegor Pogostnov - Slavia Mozyr vs Arsenal Dzerzhinsk (28 April 2024)
- (Belarus) Nikita Kaplenko - Shakhtyor Soligorsk vs Slutsk (28 April 2024)
- (Nigeria) Jonathan John - Vitebsk vs Smorgon (10 May 2024)
