= Pavel Shcherbachenya =

Belarusian footballer

Personal information
- Full name: Pavel Dmitriyevich Shcherbachenya
- Date of birth: 21 June 1996 (age 30)
- Place of birth: Soligorsk, Minsk Oblast, Belarus
- Height: 1.81 m (5 ft 11 in)
- Position: Goalkeeper

Team information
- Current team: ML Vitebsk
- Number: 30

Youth career
- 2013–2016: Shakhtyor Soligorsk

Senior career*
Years	Team	Apps	(Gls)
2016	Shakhtyor Soligorsk	0	(0)
2016	→ Smorgon (loan)	11	(0)
2017	Smorgon	7	(0)
2018	Molodechno-DYuSSh-4	28	(0)
2019	Lida	15	(0)
2020–2021	Smorgon	45	(0)
2022	Shakhtyor Petrikov	23	(0)
2023	Kyran	22	(0)
2024–	ML Vitebsk	36	(0)
2025–	→ ML Vitebsk-2	3	(0)
- * Club domestic league appearances and goals as of 4 July 2026

Pavel Dmitriyevich Shcherbachenya (Belarusian: Павел Дзмітрыевіч Шчарбачэня; Russian: Павел Дмитриевич Щербаченя; born 21 June 1996) is a Belarusian professional footballer who plays for ML Vitebsk.

== Honours ==
ML Vitebsk

- Belarusian Premier League winner: 2025
