= Vyacheslav Kaminsky =

Belarusian footballer

Personal information
- Date of birth: 5 July 1988 (age 38)
- Place of birth: Borisov, Minsk Oblast, Byelorussian SSR, Soviet Union
- Height: 1.92 m (6 ft 3 1/2 in)
- Position: Goalkeeper

Team information
- Current team: Ostrovets
- Number: 1

Youth career
- 2006–2008: Lokomotiv Minsk

Senior career*
Years	Team	Apps	(Gls)
2006–2008	Lokomotiv Minsk	0	(0)
2007	→ SKVICH Minsk	13	(0)
2009–2011	Zabudova Molodechno	73	(0)
2012–2014	Smolevichi-STI	38	(0)
2014	Slonim	4	(0)
2015	Slavia Mozyr	2	(0)
2016	Orsha	25	(0)
2017	Naftan Novopolotsk	2	(0)
2017	Luch Minsk	0	(0)
2018	Orsha	7	(0)
2018	Kletsk	8	(0)
2019	Underdog Chist	12	(0)
2019	Molodechno	7	(0)
2020–	Ostrovets	46	(1)
- * Club domestic league appearances and goals as of 31 December 2023

Vyacheslav Kaminsky (Belarusian: Вячаслаў Камінскі; Russian: Вячеслав Каминский; born 5 July 1988) is a Belarusian professional footballer who plays for Ostrovets.
