= 2023–24 Belarusian Cup =

Tournament details
- Country: Belarus
- Dates: 30 April 2023 – 25 May 2024

Final positions
- Champions: Neman Grodno
- Runners-up: Isloch Minsk Raion

The 2023–24 Belarusian Cup was the 33rd season of Belarus's annual knock-out cup football competition. The cup began on 30 April 2023 and eight rounds were played before the final, which took place on 25 May 2024.

Defending champions Torpedo-BelAZ Zhodino reached the semi-finals of this year's competition but were eliminated by eventual runners-up Isloch Minsk Raion.

In the final Neman Grodno won the cup for the second time, defeating Isloch Minsk Raion 2–0.

== First preliminary round ==
Games in the first preliminary round were played between 30 April and 1 May 2023. Two games saw teams score in double figures: DYuSSh-4 Molodechno beat Viliya 15–0 at home, while Tsentr Futbola recorded a 17–0 away victory against Lyakhaviyski Volat.

Team 1	Score	Team 2
30 April 2023
Agro-Pelishche	4–2	Pruzhany
DYuSSh-4 Molodechno	15–0	Viliya
FSK Ostrovets	1–2	Lida II
Krupki	0–6	Kolos Cherven
Lyakhaviyski Volat	0–17	Tsentr Futbola
Serebryanka Volat	0–3	BFSO Dinamo
1 May 2023
Falko	2–3	Kronon Stolbtsy
Format Pogranichnaya	w/o	Mikashevichi
Smorgon II	5–1	Oshmyany

== Second preliminary round ==
The second preliminary round took place between 30 April and 14 May 2023. The biggest win of the round was Partizan Soligorsk's 11–1 win at Berezino.

Team 1	Score	Team 2
30 April 2023
Iput-DYuSSh	2–6	Vertikal Kalinkovichi
Lepel	0–7	Miory
Polotsk	1–2	Gazovik Vitebsk
Postavy	0–4	Gorodokskiye L'vy
Senno	3–1	Niva Tolochin
Torpeda	4–0	Zarya Krugloe
1 May 2023
Spartak Shklov	2–1	Niva Chausy
Svetlogorsk	1–4	Leskhoz Gomel
6 May 2023
BGU Minsk	4–2	Torpedo
Energetik	0–2	BFSO Dinamo
Urozhaynaya	1–1 (6–5 p)	Krumkachy Minsk
8 May 2023
Uni Minsk	1–1 (3–5 p)	Traktor Minsk
13 May 2023
Tsentr Futbola	2–2 (3–4 p)	Format Pogranichnaya
14 May 2023
Berezino	1–11	Partizan Soligorsk
Bobovnya	0–1	Kolos Cherven
Drogichin	1–1 (2–4 p)	Nadezhda Baranovichi
DYuSSh-4 Molodechno	1–0	Starye Dorogi
FSK Dyatlovo	1–4	Slonim City
Ivanovo	1–0	Agro-Pelishche
Kletsk	2–5	Viktoriya Maryina Gorka
Krechet Bereza	0–1	Ivatsevichi
Lida II	3–0	Shchuchin
Luninets	0–2	Kobrin
Neman-Belkard Grodno	3–0	Svisloch
Neman Mosty	4–0	Chayka Zelva
Novaya Pripyat	3–2	Stenles Pinsk
Shankhai Slutsk	0–7	Kronon Stolbtsy
Smena Volkovysk	0–1	Fakel Novogrudok
Smorgon II	3–1	Grodnensky

== First round ==
The first round proper took place between 14 and 23 May 2023. Two games were won by seven-goal margins: Smorgon II's 8–1 win at home to Lida II, as well as the 7–0 home win for Partizan Soligorsk against DYuSSh-4 Molodechno.

Team 1	Score	Team 2
14 May 2023
Gorki	3–1	Tekhnolog-BGUT Mogilev
Miory	3–1	Gorodokskiye L'vy
Senno	0–3	Gazovik Vitebsk
Torpeda	1–1 (4–3 p)	Spartak Shklov
Urozhaynaya	3–0	BGU Minsk
Vertikal Kalinkovichi	1–4	Leskhoz Gomel
15 May 2023
BFSO Dinamo	1–5	Traktor Minsk
20 May 2023
Edinstvo Dzerzhinsk	2–0	Kronon Stolbtsy
Fakel Novogrudok	1–1 (4–1 p)	Slonim City
Ivanovo	0–2	Kobrin
Smorgon II	8–1	Lida II
Viktoriya Maryina Gorka	1–1 (8–7 p)	Kolos Cherven
21 May 2023
Ivatsevichi	4–2	Format Pogranichnaya
Nadezhda Baranovichi	1–5	Novaya Pripyat
Neman Mosty	4–3	Neman-Belkard Grodno
Partizan Soligorsk	7–0	DYuSSh-4 Molodechno
23 May 2023
MNPZ Mozyr	3–0	Zhlobin

== Second round ==
The second round took place between 24 May and 1 June 2023. Average attendance for matches in this round was 284. Two teams scored more than ten goals: ML Vitebsk beat Novaya Pripyat away, 11–2, while Lokomotiv Gomel defeated Smorgon II away, 11–0.

Team 1	Score	Team 2
24 May 2023
Novaya Pripyat	2–11	ML Vitebsk
30 May 2023
Viktoriya Maryina Gorka	0–1	Lida
31 May 2023
Edinstvo Dzerzhinsk	0–6	Volna Pinsk
Fakel Novogrudok	1–4	Osipovichi
Gazovik Vitebsk	1–3	Vitebsk
Gorki	0–1	Ostrovets
Ivatsevichi	3–0	Orsha
Kobrin	0–4	Baranovichi
Miory	3–0	Torpeda
MNPZ Mozyr	1–4	Bumprom Gomel
Neman Mosty	0–5	Dnepr Mogilev
Partizan Soligorsk	0–0 (4–5 p)	Molodechno
Smorgon II	0–11	Lokomotiv Gomel
Traktor Minsk	1–2	Slonim-2017
Urozhaynaya	0–6	Niva Dolbizno
1 June 2023
Leskhoz Gomel	1–2	Zhodino-Yuzhnoe

== Round of 32 ==
The round of 32 took place between 28 June and 23 July 2023. Average attendance for matches in this round was 915. Last season's runners-up, BATE Borisov entered in this round and won 13–0 away against Miory.

Team 1	Score	Team 2
28 June 2023
Baranovichi	0–2	Neman Grodno
Lida	1–3	Torpedo-BelAZ Zhodino
Miory	0–13	BATE Borisov
Zhodino-Yuzhnoe	0–2	Dinamo Minsk
21 July 2023
Ivatsevichi	1–6	Shakhtyor Soligorsk
Molodechno	0–1	Minsk
Vitebsk	1–0	Energetik-BGU Minsk
22 July 2023
Bumprom Gomel	0–2	Dynamo Brest
Niva Dolbizno	3–2	Naftan Novopolotsk
Ostrovets	2–0	Smorgon
Slonim-2017	1–2	Slavia Mozyr
Volna Pinsk	0–1	Slutsk
23 July 2023
Dnepr Mogilev	3–1	Belshina Bobruisk
Lokomotiv Gomel	2–2 (2–4 p)	Arsenal Dzerzhinsk
ML Vitebsk	1–4	Isloch Minsk Raion
Osipovichi	1–0	Gomel

== Round of 16 ==
The round of 16 took place between 28 July and 7 November 2023. Average attendance for matches in this round was 1,049. The highest scoring match of the round was Dinamo Minsk's 9–0 home win against Osipovichi.

Team 1	Score	Team 2
28 July 2023
Dinamo Minsk	9–0	Osipovichi
Minsk	2–0	Dnepr Mogilev
29 July 2023
Isloch Minsk Raion	1–0	Arsenal Dzerzhinsk
Shakhtyor Soligorsk	2–1	Dynamo Brest
30 July 2023
Vitebsk	1–0	Slutsk
5 September 2023
Niva Dolbizno	1–2	Torpedo-BelAZ Zhodino
1 November 2023
Neman Grodno	1–0	Slavia Mozyr
7 November 2023
BATE Borisov	3–1	Ostrovets

== Quarter-finals ==
The eight Round of 16 winners entered the quarter-finals, held over two legs. The first legs were held on 3 and 6 March 2024, followed by the second legs on 9 and 10 March 2024. The encounter between BATE Borisov and Dinamo Minsk went to a penalty shoot out after they remained level after two matches and extra time. Minsk won the shoot-out, 5–4.

Team 1	Agg.	Team 2	1st leg	2nd leg
Vitebsk	3–4	Isloch Minsk Raion	1–4	2–0
Neman Grodno	4–0	Minsk	3–0	1–0
Torpedo-BelAZ Zhodino	2–1	Shakhtyor Soligorsk	2–0	0–1
BATE Borisov	3–3 (4–5 p)	Dinamo Minsk	0–1	3–2 (a.e.t.)

== Semi-finals ==
The four quarter-final winners entered the semi-finals, held over two legs. The first legs were held on 17 April 2024, followed by the second legs on 8 May 2024.

Team 1	Agg.	Team 2	1st leg	2nd leg
Isloch Minsk Raion	2–1	Torpedo-BelAZ Zhodino	1–0	1–1 (a.e.t.)
Dinamo Minsk	1–2	Neman Grodno	1–0	0–2

== Final ==
The final was held on 25 May 2024 between the two semi-final winners, Neman Grodno and Isloch Minsk Raion. Grodno won the cup with two unanswered goals.

25 May 2024
19:00 UTC+3

Neman Grodno	2–0	Isloch Minsk Raion
Zubovich 32'; Savitsky 65'

Torpedo Stadium, Zhodzina
Attendance: 5,714
Referee: Aleksei Kulbakov
