= Anton Bahdanaw =

Belarusian footballer (born 2001)

Personal information
- Date of birth: 27 April 2001 (age 25)
- Place of birth: Smalyavichy, Minsk Oblast, Belarus
- Height: 1.77 m (5 ft 10 in)
- Position: Midfielder

Team information
- Current team: Zhodino-Yuzhnoye
- Number: 1

Youth career
- 2015–2020: Torpedo-BelAZ Zhodino

Senior career*
Years	Team	Apps	(Gls)
2018–2020	Torpedo-BelAZ Zhodino	0	(0)
2020	→ Smolevichi (loan)	4	(0)
2021	Sputnik Rechitsa	8	(0)
2022	Maxline Rogachev	17	(0)
2023–	Zhodino-Yuzhnoye	31	(10)

International career
2019	Belarus U19		
- * Club domestic league appearances and goals as of 31 December 2023

Anton Bahdanaw (Belarusian: Антон Багданаў; Russian: Антон Богданов; born 27 April 2001) is a Belarusian professional footballer who plays for Zhodino-Yuzhnoye.
