= Dmitry Nekrashevich =

Belarusian footballer

Personal information
- Date of birth: 26 August 2001 (age 25)
- Place of birth: Mikhanavichy, Minsk District, Belarus
- Height: 1.79 m (5 ft 10 in)
- Position: Midfielder

Team information
- Current team: Slutsk
- Number: 17

Youth career
- 2016–2019: Isloch Minsk Raion

Senior career*
Years	Team	Apps	(Gls)
2017–2022	Isloch Minsk Raion	8	(0)
2022	→ Naftan Novopolotsk (loan)	11	(1)
2023	Slonim-2017	16	(0)
2023	Ostrovets	13	(0)
2024	Slonim-2017	14	(0)
2024–2025	Baranovichi	46	(7)
2026–	Slutsk	14	(0)

International career
2017	Belarus U17		
- * Club domestic league appearances and goals as of 6 July 2026

Dmitry Nekrashevich (Belarusian: Дзмітрый Некрашэвіч; Russian: Дмитрий Некрашевич; born 26 August 2001) is a Belarusian professional footballer who plays for Belarusian First League club Slutsk.

On the day of his professional debut for Isloch Minsk Raion, he set the new record as the youngest ever player to play in Belarusian Premier League.
