= Ilya Dzhugir =

Belarusian professional footballer

Personal information
- Date of birth: 11 February 1999 (age 27)
- Place of birth: Zhodino, Minsk Oblast, Belarus
- Height: 1.81 m (5 ft 11 in)
- Position: Defender

Team information
- Current team: Zhodino-Yuzhnoye
- Number: 9

Youth career
- 2016–2017: Torpedo-BelAZ Zhodino

Senior career*
Years	Team	Apps	(Gls)
2017–2019	Torpedo-BelAZ Zhodino	1	(0)
2018	→ Granit Mikashevichi (loan)	11	(1)
2019	→ NFK Minsk (loan)	10	(1)
2020	Orsha	20	(1)
2021	Kronon Stolbtsy	1	(0)
2022–	Zhodino-Yuzhnoye	53	(2)

International career
2016	Belarus U19		
- * Club domestic league appearances and goals as of 31 December 2023

Ilya Dzhugir (Belarusian: Ілля Джугір; Russian: Илья Джугир; born 11 February 1999) is a Belarusian professional footballer who plays for Zhodino-Yuzhnoye.
