= Aleksei Gubochkin =

Russian footballer

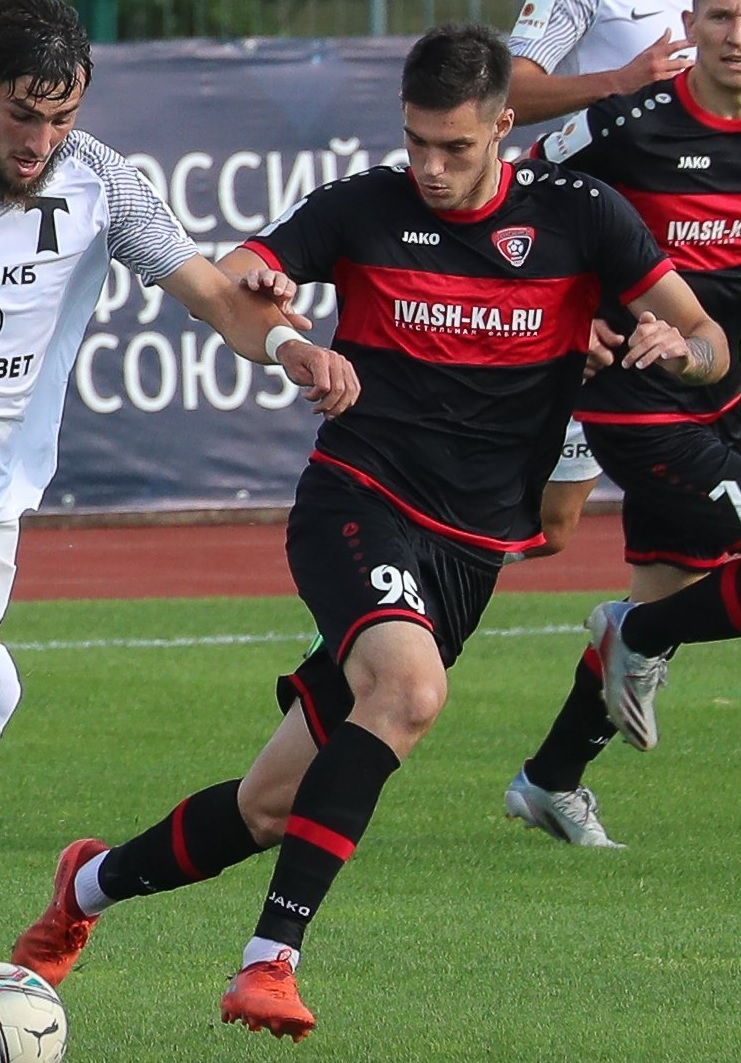
- Gubochkin with Tekstilshchik Ivanovo in 2021

Personal information
- Full name: Aleksei Alekseyevich Gubochkin
- Date of birth: 26 January 1999 (age 27)
- Place of birth: Moscow, Russia
- Height: 1.91 m (6 ft 3 in)
- Position: Defender

Youth career
- –2011: FC Torpedo Moscow
- 2011–2013: FC Spartak Moscow
- 2013–2014: TsSO Lokomotiv-2 Moscow
- 2014–2017: FC Lokomotiv Moscow

Senior career*
| Years | Team | Apps | (Gls) |
| 2016–2018 | FC Lokomotiv Moscow | 0 | (0) |
| 2018–2019 | FC Akademiya Futbola Rostov-on-Don | 16 | (1) |
| 2019–2020 | FC Saturn Ramenskoye | 20 | (0) |
| 2020–2022 | FC Tekstilshchik Ivanovo | 53 | (5) |
| 2022 | FC Chayka Peschanokopskoye | 4 | (1) |
| 2022–2023 | FC Amkar Perm | 18 | (1) |
| 2023–2024 | FC Tyumen | 0 | (0) |
- * Club domestic league appearances and goals as of 25 November 2023

Aleksei Alekseyevich Gubochkin (Russian: Алексей Алексеевич Губочкин; born 26 January 1999) is a Russian football player.

== Club career ==
He made his debut in the Russian Football National League for FC Tekstilshchik Ivanovo on 1 August 2020 in a game against FC Veles Moscow, he substituted Aleksandr Shlyonkin in the 71st minute and was sent-off for a bad foul just 7 minutes later.
