= Roman Davyskiba =

Belarusian footballer

Personal information
- Date of birth: 31 March 2001 (age 25)
- Place of birth: Zhlobin, Gomel Oblast, Belarus
- Height: 1.80 m (5 ft 11 in)
- Position: Midfielder

Team information
- Current team: Ostrovets
- Number: 18

Youth career
- 2013–2019: Dinamo Minsk

Senior career*
Years	Team	Apps	(Gls)
2020–2023	Dinamo Minsk	29	(2)
2022	→ Shakhtyor Soligorsk (loan)	8	(0)
2023	Naftan Novopolotsk	7	(1)
2024–2025	Gomel	29	(0)
2025	Molodechno	10	(0)
2026–	Ostrovets	13	(1)

International career^{‡}
2017	Belarus U17	3	(0)
2019	Belarus U19	3	(1)
2020–2022	Belarus U21	12	(2)
- * Club domestic league appearances and goals as of 6 July 2026 ‡ National team caps and goals as of 8 June 2022

Roman Davyskiba (Belarusian: Раман Давыскіба; Russian: Роман Давыскиба; born 31 March 2001) is a Belarusian professional footballer who plays for Belarusian First League club Ostrovets.
