= Nikolay Makarevich =

Belarusian footballer

Personal information
- Date of birth: 22 May 2002 (age 24)
- Place of birth: Borisov, Minsk Oblast, Belarus
- Position: Midfielder

Team information
- Current team: Zhodino-Yuzhnoye
- Number: 22

Youth career
- 2017–2021: Torpedo-BelAZ Zhodino

Senior career*
Years	Team	Apps	(Gls)
2021–	Torpedo-BelAZ Zhodino	2	(0)
2023–	→ Zhodino-Yuzhnoye (loan)	18	(0)
- * Club domestic league appearances and goals as of 31 December 2023

Nikolay Makarevich (Belarusian: Мікалай Макарэвіч; Russian: Николай Макаревич; born 22 May 2002) is a Belarusian professional footballer who plays for Zhodino-Yuzhnoye on loan from Torpedo-BelAZ Zhodino.
