= Skripchenko =

Skripchenko is a gender-neutral East Slavic surname. Notable people with the surname include:

- Almira Skripchenko (born 1976), Moldovan-French chess player
- Vadim Skripchenko (born 1975), Belarusian football coach and player
