= Sergei Karasev =

Russian international referee (born 1979)

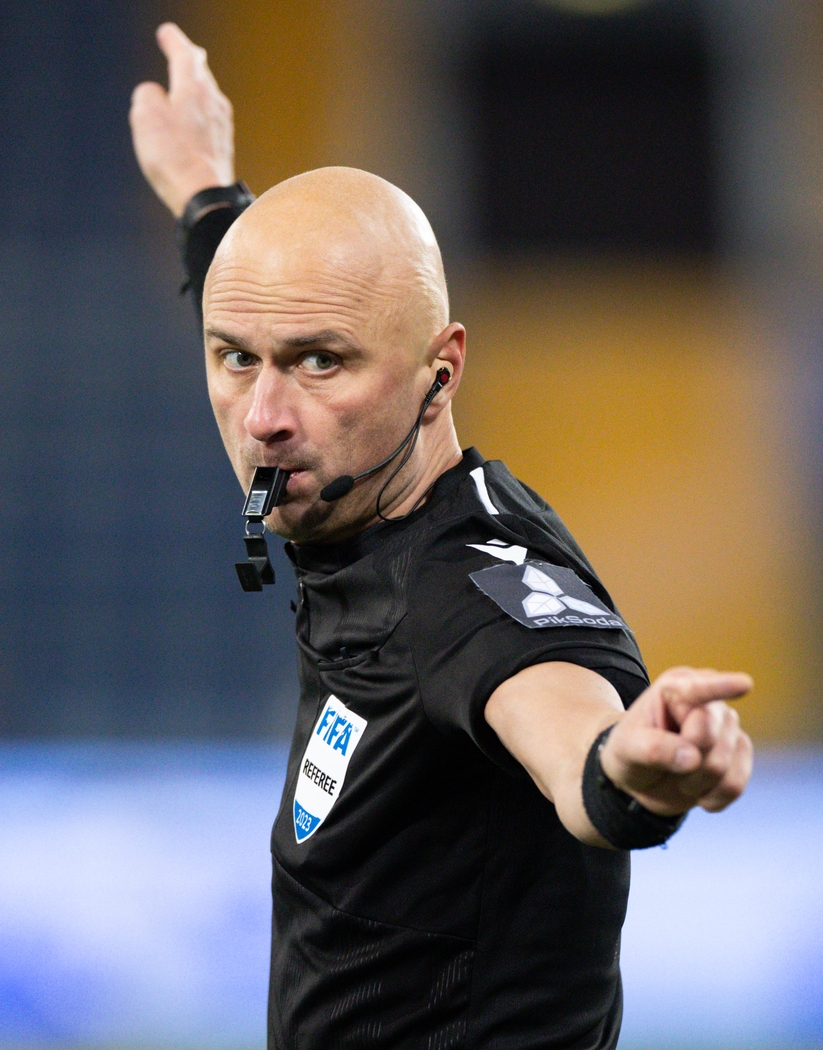
- Karasev in 2023
- Full name: Sergei Gennadyevich Karasev
- Born: 12 June 1979 (age 47); Moscow, Russian SFSR, Soviet Union

Domestic
Years	League	Role

International
Years	League	Role
2010–	FIFA listed	Referee

Sergei Gennadyevich Karasev (Russian: Сергей Геннадьевич Карасёв; born 12 June 1979) is a Russian international referee.

== Refereeing career ==
Karasev became a FIFA referee in 2010. He has refereed at 2014 FIFA World Cup qualifiers, beginning with the Group A match between Scotland and Macedonia. At UEFA Euro 2020, he refereed three matches starting with Italy against Switzerland. In particular, he became the first Russian referee to be appointed to referee a World Cup or a UEFA Euro play-off match since 2008. He was often recognized as the best Russian referee.

On August 18, 2024, the Russian team of referees headed by Sergei Karasev officiated the match of the 18th round of the 2024 Belarusian Premier League between FC BATE Borisov and FC Gomel.

== Personal life ==
Karasev is married with two children. His primary hobby is attending metal concerts. In his interview for RIA Novosti, he names Slayer as his favourite metal band.

== See also ==
- List of FIFA international referees

Sporting positions (Russia) Sergei Karasev
Preceded by (England) Anthony Taylor	2021 UEFA Super Cup Referee	Succeeded by (England) Michael Oliver
