= Maksim Lotysh =

Belarusian footballer

Personal information
- Date of birth: 10 February 2001 (age 25)
- Place of birth: Minsk, Belarus
- Height: 1.70 m (5 ft 7 in)
- Position: Midfielder

Youth career
- 2016–2017: Minsk
- 2018–2020: Dinamo Brest

Senior career*
Years	Team	Apps	(Gls)
2018–2022	Dinamo Brest	3	(0)
2022–2023	Slonim-2017	39	(5)
2024–2025	Ostrovets	45	(6)
- * Club domestic league appearances and goals as of 2 July 2025

Maksim Lotysh (Belarusian: Максім Лотыш; Russian: Максим Лотыш; born 5 June 2002) is a Belarusian professional footballer.

== Honours ==
Dinamo Brest

- Belarusian Super Cup winner: 2019
