= Krot =

Krot (Belarusian: Крот) is a Belarusian surname meaning mole (the mammal). It is a cognate of Kret (Polish), Krit (Ukrainian), and Krtek (Czech). Notable people with the surname include:

- Syarhey Krot (born 1980), Belarusian football player
- Yuriy Krot (born 1968), Belarusian football player and coach
