= Anton Shunto =

Belarusian footballer

Personal information
- Date of birth: 31 May 1988 (age 38)
- Place of birth: Smolevichi, Minsk Oblast, Belarus
- Height: 2.01 m (6 ft 7 in)
- Position: Goalkeeper

Team information
- Current team: Zhodino-Yuzhnoye

Senior career*
Years	Team	Apps	(Gls)
2014–2019	Krumkachy Minsk	41	(0)
2019	Molodechno	9	(0)
2020–2021	Baranovichi	29	(0)
2022–	Zhodino-Yuzhnoye	23	(0)
- * Club domestic league appearances and goals as of 31 December 2023

Anton Shunto (Belarusian: Антон Шунто; Russian: Антон Шунто; born 31 May 1988) is a Belarusian professional footballer who plays for Zhodino-Yuzhnoye.

He is a younger brother of Denis Shunto, who is a founder and former president of Krumkachy Minsk.

== Career ==
Shunto started his career with FC Krumkachy Minsk.
