= Yegor Strelkovskiy =

Belarusian footballer

Personal information
- Date of birth: 6 March 2002 (age 24)
- Place of birth: Minsk, Belarus
- Position: Defender

Youth career
- 2018–2019: Luch Minsk
- 2019–2020: Energetik-BGU Minsk

Senior career*
| Years | Team | Apps | (Gls) |
| 2021–2023 | Shakhtyor Soligorsk | 0 | (0) |
| 2021–2022 | → Energetik-BGU Minsk | 11 | (0) |
| 2023 | → Shakhtyor Petrikov | 6 | (0) |

International career^{‡}
| 2021 | Belarus U21 | 1 | (0) |
- * Club domestic league appearances and goals as of 31 December 2023 ‡ National team caps and goals as of 29 March 2021

Yegor Strelkovskiy (Belarusian: Ягор Стралкоўскі; Russian: Егор Стрелковский; born 6 March 2002) is a Belarusian professional footballer who plays for Shakhtyor Petrikov.
