= Pavel Golovenko =

Belarusian footballer

Personal information
- Date of birth: 12 January 1997 (age 29)
- Place of birth: Minsk, Belarus
- Height: 1.80 m (5 ft 11 in)
- Position: Goalkeeper

Team information
- Current team: Żyrardowianka Żyrardów

Youth career
- 2014–2016: Minsk

Senior career*
Years	Team	Apps	(Gls)
2016–2019	Minsk	9	(0)
2019	Lida	0	(0)
2020–2021	Arsenal Dzerzhinsk	14	(0)
2022	Zhodino-Yuzhnoye	6	(0)
2022–	Żyrardowianka Żyrardów		

International career^{‡}
2015	Belarus U19	3	(0)
2017	Belarus U21	1	(0)
- * Club domestic league appearances and goals as of 31 August 2022 ‡ National team caps and goals as of 14 November 2017

Pavel Golovenko (Belarusian: Павел Галавенка; Russian: Павел Головенко; born 12 January 1997) is a Belarusian professional footballer who plays for Żyrardowianka Żyrardów.
