= Maksim Lutskiy =

Belarusian footballer (born 2002)

Personal information
- Date of birth: 9 October 2002 (age 24)
- Place of birth: Minsk, Belarus
- Position: Defender

Team information
- Current team: Molodechno
- Number: 2

Youth career
- 2018–2020: Minsk

Senior career*
Years	Team	Apps	(Gls)
2020	Minsk	0	(0)
2021	Rukh Brest	0	(0)
2021	→ Minsk (loan)	15	(0)
2022	Naftan Novopolotsk	7	(0)
2022–	Molodechno	12	(1)

International career
2018–2019	Belarus U17	2	(0)
- * Club domestic league appearances and goals as of 31 December 2023

Maksim Lutskiy (Belarusian: Максім Луцкі; Russian: Максим Луцкий; born 9 October 2002) is a Belarusian professional footballer who plays for Molodechno.
