= Denis Kovalevich =

Belarusian footballer

Personal information
- Date of birth: 29 March 2003 (age 23)
- Place of birth: Antonovka, Gomel Oblast, Belarus
- Position: Midfielder

Team information
- Current team: Dinamo Brest
- Number: 88

Youth career
- 2014–2017: Shakhtyor Soligorsk
- 2017–2020: Dinamo Brest

Senior career*
Years	Team	Apps	(Gls)
2021	Rukh Brest	3	(0)
2022	Shakhtyor Petrikov	21	(11)
2023–2024	Shakhtyor Soligorsk	46	(7)
2025–	Dinamo Brest	42	(6)

International career^{‡}
2022	Belarus U21	2	(0)
- * Club domestic league appearances and goals as of 6 July 2026 ‡ National team caps and goals as of 27 September 2022

Denis Kovalevich (Belarusian: Дзяніс Кавалевіч; Russian: Денис Ковалевич; born 29 March 2003) is a Belarusian professional footballer, who plays for Dinamo Brest.
