= 2025 Belarusian Super Cup =

Neman Grodno	Dinamo Minsk
0	2
- Date: 22 February 2025
- Venue: Stadyen FK Minsk, Minsk
- Referee: Amin Kurhchieli
- Attendance: 2711

The 2025 Belarusian Super Cup was held on 2 March 2024 between the 2024 Belarusian Premier League champions Dinamo Minsk and the 2023–24 Belarusian Cup winners Neman Grodno.

Dinamo Minsk defeating Neman Grodno 2–0 for their 1st Belarusian Super Cup title.

== Match details ==
22 February 2025
17:00 UTC+3

Neman Grodno	0–2	Dinamo Minsk
	Report	Jaŭhien Šaŭčenka; Raman Biehunoŭ

Stadyen FK Minsk, Minsk
Attendance: 2,711
Referee: Amin Kurhchieli

Neman Grodno:	DINAMO:

== See also ==
- 2024 Belarusian Premier League
- 2023–24 Belarusian Cup
