= Vadim Brazovsky =

Belarusian footballer and coach

Personal information
- Full name: Vadim Brazovsky
- Date of birth: 1 February 1968 (age 58)
- Place of birth: Novokuznetsk, Russian SFSR
- Position: Defender

Team information
- Current team: Torpedo-BelAZ Zhodino (youth coach)

Senior career*
Years	Team	Apps	(Gls)
1985–1993	Torpedo Zhodino	42	(3)
1993–1995	Shakhtyor Soligorsk	73	(2)
1996	Vairogs Rēzekne	14	(0)
1996	Torpedo-Kadino Mogilev	12	(0)
1997	Transmash Mogilev	13	(0)
1997–1998	Shakhtyor Soligorsk	25	(0)
1999–2000	Torpedo Zhodino	43	(2)
2001	Granit Mikashevichi	21	(0)
2002	MTZ-RIPO Minsk	4	(0)

Managerial career
- 2003–2007: Darida Minsk Raion (assistant)
- 2006: Darida Minsk Raion (caretaker)
- 2007: Darida Minsk Raion (caretaker)
- 2008: Darida Minsk Raion
- 2010–2011: Torpedo-BelAZ Zhodino (youth coach)
- 2011–2012: Torpedo-BelAZ Zhodino (assistant)
- 2012: Torpedo-BelAZ Zhodino
- 2012–: Torpedo-BelAZ Zhodino (youth coach)
- * Club domestic league appearances and goals

Vadim Brazovsky (Russian: Вадим Бразовский; born 1 February 1968) is a Belarusian professional football coach and a former player. Since November 2012, he works as a youth coach in Torpedo-BelAZ Zhodino. In recent years he has been a head coach in Darida Minsk Raion and Torpedo-BelAZ Zhodino in Belarusian Premier League.
