= Aleksandr Brazevich =

Belarusian footballer and manager

Personal information
- Date of birth: 1 June 1973 (age 53)
- Place of birth: Postavy, Byelorussian SSR, Soviet Union
- Position: Midfielder

Senior career*
| Years | Team | Apps | (Gls) |
| 1993–1994 | Ataka-Aura Minsk | | |

Managerial career
- 2003–2006: MTZ-RIPO Minsk (youth)
- 2004–2007: Belarus U17 (assistant)
- 2006–2007: MTZ-RIPO Minsk (assistant)
- 2007–2008: FBK Kaunas (assistant)
- 2009: Tauras Tauragė
- 2009: Smorgon
- 2010: Torpedo Zhodino
- 2011: Vedrich-97 Rechitsa
- 2012: Minsk (assistant)
- 2012–2013: Vedrich-97 Rechitsa
- 2013: Tauras Tauragė
- 2013–2015: Rechitsa-2014
- 2015: Torpedo Mogilev
- 2015: Smolevichi-STI
- 2015–2017: BATE Borisov (youth/scout)
- 2017: Žalgiris Vilnius
- 2017–2020: Smolevichi
- 2020–2022: Slutsk
- 2023: Arsenal Dzerzhinsk
- 2024: Dinamo Brest
- * Club domestic league appearances and goals

Aleksandr Brazevich (Belarusian: Аляксандр Бразевіч; Russian: Александр Бразевич; born 1 June 1973) is a Belarusian football manager and former player.

== Career ==
Brazevich retired from playing career at the age of 21 after two years at Ataka-Aura Minsk. He began his coaching career in 2003, working as a youth coach for MTZ-RIPO Minsk. In 2010, he led Torpedo Zhodino to the Belarusian Cup final.

Since 2015, he was working at BATE Borisov as scouting and youth development program director.

On 24 October 2017, defending Lithuanian champions Žalgiris Vilnius hired Brazevich as an interim head coach to replace Valdas Dambrauskas. He was released by the club on 24 November 2017, after managing for 5 games, due to club's failure to secure A Lyga title.

In October 2020, Brazevich was appointed head coach of FC Slutsk.
