= Andrey Rum =

Belarusian footballer

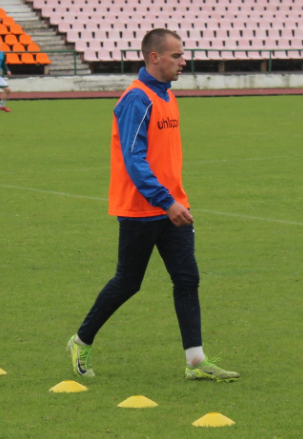

Personal information
- Date of birth: 19 January 2002 (age 24)
- Place of birth: Lida, Grodno Oblast, Belarus
- Position: Defender

Team information
- Current team: Slutsk
- Number: 15

Youth career
- 2018–2020: Slutsk

Senior career*
Years	Team	Apps	(Gls)
2020–	Slutsk	82	(2)

International career
2018	Belarus U17		
- * Club domestic league appearances and goals as of 6 July 2026

Andrey Rum (Belarusian: Андрэй Рум; Russian: Андрей Рум; born 19 January 2002) is a Belarusian professional footballer who plays for Slutsk.
