= Timur Ivanov (footballer) =

Russian footballer

Personal information
- Full name: Timur Pavlovich Ivanov
- Date of birth: 21 February 2005 (age 21)
- Place of birth: Borovichi, Novgorod Oblast, Russia
- Height: 1.83 m (6 ft 0 in)
- Position: Right winger

Team information
- Current team: FC Maxline Vitebsk
- Number: 7

Youth career
- FC Zenit Saint Petersburg

Senior career*
| Years | Team | Apps | (Gls) |
| 2024–2026 | FC Zenit-2 Saint Petersburg | 31 | (13) |
| 2026– | FC Maxline Vitebsk | 9 | (1) |

International career^{‡}
| 2021 | Russia U17 | 2 | (0) |
| 2023 | Russia U19 | 3 | (0) |
- * Club domestic league appearances and goals as of 10 July 2026 ‡ National team caps and goals as of 31 May 2023

Timur Pavlovich Ivanov (Russian: Тимур Павлович Ивнанов; born 21 February 2005) is a Russian football player who plays for Belarusian Premier League club Maxline Vitebsk.

== Club career ==
On 2 March 2026, he signed a 3-year contract with Maxline Vitebsk.

He made his debut in the Belarusian Premier League for Maxline Vitebsk on 4 April 2026 in a game against Isloch.

== Honours ==
=== Club ===
Zenit-2 Saint Petersburg

- Russian Second League Division B: 2025
