= 2023 Belarusian Premier League =

Belarusian Premier League
- Season: 2023
- Champions: Dinamo Minsk
- Relegated: Belshina Bobruisk; Energetik-BGU Minsk
- Champions League: Dinamo Minsk
- Conference League: Isloch Minsk Raion; Neman Grodno; Torpedo-BelAZ Zhodino
- Matches: 142
- Goals: 364 (2.56 per match)
- Top goalscorer: Pavel Savitsky; Vladislav Morozov; Yegor Karpitsky (12 goals each)
- Biggest home win: Dinamo Minsk 7–2 Belshina Bobruisk (1 July 2023)
- Biggest away win: Smorgon 0–4 Isloch Minsk Raion (7 April 2023); Gomel 0–4 Dinamo Minsk (13 May 2023)
- Highest scoring: Shakhtyor Soligorsk 7–3 Belshina Bobruisk (9 April 2023)
- Longest winning run: 6 matches Neman Grodno
- Longest unbeaten run: 12 matches Torpedo-BelAZ Zhodino
- Longest winless run: 10 matches Energetik-BGU Minsk
- Longest losing run: 8 matches Naftan Novopolotsk
- All statistics correct as of 17 September 2023.

The 2023 Belarusian Premier League was the 33rd season of top-tier football in Belarus. Shakhtyor Soligorsk were the defending champions (although they were stripped of their title as a result of a match-fixing scandal).

The winners (Dinamo Minsk, their eighth title win) qualified for the 2024–25 Champions League first qualifying round. The 2023–24 Belarusian Cup winners (Neman Grodno) qualified for the 2024–25 Conference League second qualifying round, with the third and fourth-placed teams (Torpedo-BelAZ Zhodino and Isloch Minsk Raion) qualifying for the first qualifying round. The fourteenth-placed team (Energetik-BGU Minsk) qualified for the Belarusian Premier League play-off, losing and being relegated to the 2024 Belarusian First League alongside the bottom-placed team (Belshina Bobruisk).

== Teams ==
The bottom-placed teams from the 2022 season (Vitebsk and Dnepr Mogilev) were relegated to the First League. They were replaced by Naftan Novopolotsk and Smorgon, champions and runners-up of the 2022 Belarusian First League respectively.

14th-placed team of the last season (Arsenal Dzerzhinsk) were relegated after they lost relegation/promotion playoffs against First League third-placed team Maxline Rogachev. Despite winning the play-off, Maxline Rogachev were denied Premier League license and remained in the First League. As no other potential replacement team applied for the license, it was decided to play 2023 season with just 15 clubs.

Team	Location	Venue	Capacity	Position in 2022
BATE	Borisov	Borisov Arena	13,126	3rd
Belshina	Bobruisk	Spartak Stadium	3,700	12th
Dinamo Minsk	Minsk	Dinamo Stadium	22,000	4th
Dynamo Brest	Brest	OSK Brestsky	10,169	13th
Energetik-BGU	Minsk	RCOR-BGU Stadium	1,500	2nd
Gomel	Gomel	Central Stadium	14,307	7th
Isloch	Minsk	FC Minsk Stadium	3,000	5th
Minsk	Minsk	FC Minsk Stadium	3,000	6th
Naftan	Novopolotsk	Atlant Stadium	5,300	1st (First League)
Neman	Grodno	Neman Stadium	8,479	9th
Shakhtyor	Soligorsk	Stroitel Stadium	4,200	1st
Slavia	Mozyr	Yunost Stadium	5,300	10th
Slutsk	Slutsk	City Stadium	1,896	11th
Smorgon	Smorgon	Yunost Stadium	3,200	2nd (First League)
Torpedo-BelAZ	Zhodino	Torpedo Stadium	6,524	8th

Locations of the 2023 Belarusian Premier League teams

== League table ==
Pos	Team	Pld	W	D	L	GF	GA	GD	Pts	Qualification or relegation
1	Dinamo Minsk (C)	28	22	3	3	72	21	+51	69	Qualification for the Champions League first qualifying round
2	Neman Grodno	28	19	5	4	60	22	+38	62	Qualification for the Conference League second qualifying round (Note: Neman Grodno qualified for the Conference League second qualifying round by winning the 2023–24 Belarusian Cup. Since they qualified based on league position, the second Conference League first round spot was passed to the fourth-placed team.)
3	Torpedo-BelAZ Zhodino	28	12	13	3	33	18	+15	49	Qualification for the Conference League first qualifying round
4	Isloch Minsk Raion	28	14	5	9	40	29	+11	47 (Note: Head-to-head points: Isloch Minsk Raion 4, BATE Borisov 1.)	Qualification for the Conference League first qualifying round
5	BATE Borisov	28	14	5	9	49	32	+17	47	
6	Gomel	28	11	8	9	45	48	−3	41	
7	Slavia Mozyr	28	11	7	10	32	30	+2	40	
8	Slutsk	28	9	8	11	38	40	−2	35	
9	Minsk	28	8	9	11	21	26	−5	33	
10	Dynamo Brest	28	9	3	16	33	50	−17	30	
11	Smorgon	28	7	3	18	28	59	−31	24	
12	Naftan Novopolotsk	28	6	5	17	28	57	−29	23	
13	Shakhtyor Soligorsk	28	13	5	10	50	40	+10	9 (Note: Shakhtyor Soligorsk were deducted 35 points for match-fixing.)	
14	Energetik-BGU Minsk (R)	28	7	6	15	25	42	−17	4 (Note: Energetik-BGU Minsk were deducted 23 points for match-fixing.)	Qualification for the Belarusian Premier League play-off
15	Belshina Bobruisk (R)	28	3	5	20	21	61	−40	3 (Note: Belshina Bobruisk were deducted 11 points for match-fixing.)	Relegation to the Belarusian First League

Source: Soccerway
Rules for classification: 1) Points; 2) Head-to-head points; 3) Head-to-head goal difference; 4) Head-to-head goals scored; 5) Goal difference; 6) Matches won; 7) Goals scored.
(C) Champions; (R) Relegated

== Results ==
Each team plays home-and-away once against every other team for a total of 28 matches over 30 matchdays.

Home \ Away	BAT	BSH	DMI	DBR	ENE	GOM	ISL	FCM	NAF	NEM	SHA	SLA	SLU	SMR	TZH
BATE Borisov	—	2–1	1–3	4–0	1–1	1–2	1–2	1–2	1–2	3–2	2–0	1–1	4–3	2–0	1–2
Belshina Bobruisk	0–3	—	0–4	1–0	0–1	0–2	0–2	1–2	0–3	0–2	1–4	1–1	1–1	2–0	0–0
Dinamo Minsk	0–1	7–2	—	4–1	2–0	2–1	3–0	1–0	3–1	2–1	1–0	2–2	3–1	7–0	1–0
Dynamo Brest	1–2	3–2	1–3	—	0–2	3–3	0–1	1–0	2–2	1–3	3–3	0–1	2–1	2–1	0–1
Energetik-BGU Minsk	1–0	0–0	1–4	1–0	—	1–2	0–1	1–0	0–1	1–3	1–4	3–1	1–0	2–4	1–2
Gomel	0–2	2–0	0–4	1–4	1–0	—	0–2	2–0	3–2	3–3	3–2	3–2	4–5	2–0	0–3
Isloch Minsk Raion	1–1	2–0	2–3	3–0	3–2	3–1	—	0–0	5–1	0–3	2–1	0–1	0–0	1–0	1–2
Minsk	2–2	2–1	1–1	0–1	1–1	2–2	2–1	—	1–0	0–1	0–0	2–0	0–1	2–1	1–0
Naftan Novopolotsk	0–7	0–1	0–3	0–3	4–0	1–1	0–1	0–0	—	0–3	1–1	2–2	2–1	2–2	0–1
Neman Grodno	0–1	3–1	1–0	3–1	2–0	2–2	0–0	3–0	6–1	—	0–1	1–0	2–0	3–1	0–0
Shakhtyor Soligorsk	3–0	7–3	0–4	2–0	3–2	1–1	3–0	1–0	2–1	2–5	—	0–1	1–0	2–0	0–1
Slavia Mozyr	0–2	4–1	0–2	0–1	0–0	0–0	2–1	1–0	1–0	0–2	3–1	—	1–0	4–1	0–1
Slutsk	1–0	2–1	1–2	2–0	1–1	3–1	1–1	1–1	3–1	0–2	3–2	1–0	—	3–3	0–0
Smorgon	1–2	1–0	3–1	3–1	1–0	0–3	0–4	0–0	1–0	1–3	1–3	0–2	3–2	—	1–1
Torpedo-BelAZ Zhodino	1–1	1–1	0–0	1–2	1–1	0–0	2–1	1–0	5–0	1–1	1–1	2–2	0–1	2–1	—

Source: Soccerway
Legend: Blue = home team win; Yellow = draw; Red = away team win.

== Belarusian Premier League play-off ==
The fourteenth-placed club (Energetik-BGU Minsk) faced the third-placed club from the 2023 Belarusian First League (Vitebsk) for the final place in the following season's Belarusian Premier League.

=== First leg ===
6 December 2023	Energetik-BGU Minsk	0–0	Vitebsk	Minsk
16:00 BST				Stadium: RCOR-BGU Stadium

=== Second leg ===
9 December 2023	Vitebsk	1–0 (1–0 agg.)	Energetik-BGU Minsk	Vitebsk
16:00 BST	Teverov 7' (pen.)			Stadium: Vitebsky Central Sport Complex

== Statistics ==
=== Top scorers ===
As of 2 December 2023

Rank	Player	Club	Goals
1	(Belarus) Vladislav Morozov	Dinamo Minsk	16
2	(Belarus) Yahor Zubovich	Neman Grodno	14
3	(Belarus) Pavel Savitsky	Neman Grodno	13
4	(Belarus) Yegor Karpitsky	Shakhtyor Soligorsk	12
4	(Belarus) Mikhail Gordeychuk	Dynamo Brest	12
6	(Russia) Andrei Panyukov	Naftan Novopolotsk	10
7	(Montenegro) Dušan Bakić	Dinamo Minsk	9
7	(Togo) Euloge Placca Fessou	Shakhtyor Soligorsk	9
7	(Kazakhstan) Denis Mitrofanov	Isloch Minsk Raion	9
7	(Belarus) Denis Kozlovskiy	Gomel	9

== Attendances ==
#	Football club	Home games	Average attendance
1	Dinamo Minsk	14	5,133
2	Dynamo Brest	14	4,967
3	FC Gomel	14	3,082
4	FC Slavia Mozyr	14	2,729
5	BATE Borisov	14	2,535
6	Neman Grodno	14	2,286
7	Torpedo Zhodino	14	1,750
8	Shakhtyor Soligorsk	14	1,353
9	FC Smorgon	14	1,264
10	FC Slutsk	14	1,167
11	Belshina Bobruisk	14	991
12	Naftan Novopolotsk	14	487
13	Isloch Minsk Raion	14	420
14	FC Minsk	14	402
15	FC Energetik-BGU Minsk	14	330
