= Arseniy Kontsedaylov =

Russian-born Belarusian footballer

Personal information
- Date of birth: 15 July 1997 (age 29)
- Place of birth: Kaliningrad, Russia
- Height: 1.72 m (5 ft 8 in)
- Position: Forward

Team information
- Current team: Slutsk
- Number: 77

Youth career
- 2015–2018: Minsk

Senior career*
| Years | Team | Apps | (Gls) |
| 2017–2018 | Minsk | 8 | (0) |
| 2019 | Oshmyany | 14 | (6) |
| 2019 | Energetik-BGU Minsk | 10 | (1) |
| 2020 | Oshmyany | 24 | (6) |
| 2021 | Sputnik Rechitsa | 15 | (3) |
| 2021–2022 | Slutsk | 40 | (6) |
| 2023 | Dinamo Brest | 10 | (0) |
| 2023 | Arsenal Dzerzhinsk | 16 | (4) |
| 2026– | Slutsk | 13 | (5) |
- * Club domestic league appearances and goals as of 6 July 2026

Arseniy Kontsedaylov (Belarusian: Арсеній Канцадайлаў; Russian: Арсений Концедайлов; born 15 July 1997) is a Russian-born Belarusian professional footballer who plays for Slutsk.
