= Dzmitry Kharytonaw =

Belarusian footballer

Personal information
- Date of birth: 12 April 1997 (age 29)
- Place of birth: Belarus
- Height: 1.86 m (6 ft 1 in)
- Position: Goalkeeper

Team information
- Current team: Neftchi Kochkor-Ata
- Number: 35

Youth career
- 2013–2017: Vitebsk

Senior career*
Years	Team	Apps	(Gls)
2013–2014	Vitebsk-2	8	(0)
2017–2020	Vitebsk	0	(0)
2017	→ Orsha (loan)	30	(0)
2018	→ Naftan Novopolotsk (loan)	26	(0)
2019	→ Orsha (loan)	27	(0)
2021	Slutsk	7	(0)
2022–2026	Vitebsk	69	(0)
2026–	Neftchi Kochkor-Ata	3	(0)
- * Club domestic league appearances and goals as of 1 September 2026

Dzmitry Kharytonaw (Belarusian: Дзмітрый Харытонаў; Russian: Дмитрий Харитонов; born 12 April 1997) is a Belarusian professional footballer who plays for Neftchi Kochkor-Ata.

== Career ==
On 16 January 2020, the BFF banned Kharytonaw for 12 months for his involvement in the match fixing.
