= Andrey Kren =

Belarusian footballer

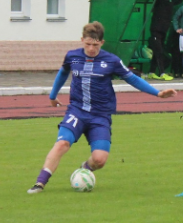

Personal information
- Date of birth: 11 November 2003 (age 23)
- Place of birth: Ivatsevichy, Brest Oblast, Belarus
- Height: 1.74 m (5 ft 9 in)
- Position: Midfielder

Team information
- Current team: Slutsk
- Number: 71

Youth career
- 2017–2020: Slutsk

Senior career*
| Years | Team | Apps | (Gls) |
| 2020– | Slutsk | 55 | (2) |
- * Club domestic league appearances and goals as of 1 December 2025

Andrey Kren (Belarusian: Андрэй Крэнь; Russian: Андрей Крень; born 11 November 2003) is a Belarusian professional footballer who plays for Slutsk.
