= Ilya Moskalenchik =

Belarusian footballer

Personal information
- Full name: Ilya Andreyevich Moskalenchik
- Date of birth: 4 May 2003 (age 23)
- Place of birth: Lyasny, Minsk Raion, Belarus
- Height: 1.80 m (5 ft 11 in)
- Position: Forward

Team information
- Current team: Maxline Vitebsk (on loan from Arsenal Tula)
- Number: 45

Youth career
- 2018–2020: Dinamo Brest

Senior career*
Years	Team	Apps	(Gls)
2021–2022	Rukh Brest	0	(0)
2021	→ Dinamo Brest (loan)	12	(0)
2022–2024	Zenit Saint Petersburg	0	(0)
2022–2023	→ Zenit-2 Saint Petersburg	45	(1)
2024	→ Tyumen (loan)	10	(0)
2024	Alania Vladikavkaz	17	(0)
2025–	Arsenal Tula	6	(0)
2025–	Arsenal-2 Tula	3	(0)
2026–	→ Maxline Vitebsk (loan)	14	(0)

International career^{‡}
2019	Belarus U17	2	(0)
2021	Belarus U19	3	(0)
2022–2023	Belarus U21	12	(0)
- * Club domestic league appearances and goals as of 4 July 2026 ‡ National team caps and goals as of 20 November 2023

Ilya Andreyevich Moskalenchik (Belarusian: Ілья Андрэевіч Маскаленчык; Russian: Илья Андреевич Москаленчик; born 4 May 2003) is a Belarusian professional footballer who plays for Maxline Vitebsk on loan from Russian club Arsenal Tula.

== Club career ==
On 13 March 2022, Moskalenchik signed a contract until the end of the 2024–25 season with Russian champions Zenit Saint Petersburg and was assigned to the farm club Zenit-2.

On 29 December 2023, Moskalenchik moved on loan to Tyumen until the end of the season.

On 5 July 2024, Moskalenchik signed a three-year contract with Russian First League club Alania Vladikavkaz.
