= Vyachaslaw Hryharaw =

Belarusian footballer (born 1982)

Personal information
- Date of birth: 8 March 1982 (age 44)
- Place of birth: Baranovichi, Brest Oblast, Byelorussian SSR, Soviet Union
- Height: 1.80 m (5 ft 11 in)
- Position: Midfielder

Team information
- Current team: Football Center Brest (manager)

Senior career*
Years	Team	Apps	(Gls)
1998–1999	RUOR Minsk	40	(5)
2000	RShVSM-Olympia Minsk	4	(1)
2000–2002	BATE Borisov	40	(7)
2003–2004	Torpedo-SKA Minsk	40	(2)
2005–2006	Neman Grodno	37	(1)
2007	Granit Mikashevichi	12	(1)
2007	Mutěnice		
2008–2010	Granit Mikashevichi	61	(2)
2011–2015	Slutsk	107	(4)

International career
2001–2002	Belarus U21	3	(0)

Managerial career
- 2015–2017: Slutsk
- 2017–2018: Minsk (youth)
- 2019–2020: Minsk (women)
- 2021: Rukh Brest (assistant)
- 2021–2022: Rukh Brest
- 2023–: Football Center Brest
- * Club domestic league appearances and goals

Vyachaslaw Hryharaw (Belarusian: Вячаслаў Грыгараў; Russian: Вячеслав Григоров; born 8 March 1982) is a Belarusian professional football coach and former player. From 2015 till 2017 he managed FC Slutsk.

== Honours ==
BATE Borisov

- Belarusian Premier League champion: 2002
