= Aleksandr Shlyonkin =

Russian footballer

Personal information
- Full name: Aleksandr Yuryevich Shlyonkin
- Date of birth: 12 October 2000 (age 26)
- Place of birth: Ivanovo, Russia
- Height: 1.85 m (6 ft 1 in)
- Position: Forward

Team information
- Current team: Molodechno
- Number: 37

Youth career
- Tekstilshchik Ivanovo

Senior career*
Years	Team	Apps	(Gls)
2018–2024	Tekstilshchik Ivanovo	60	(6)
2024–2026	Dynamo Bryansk	33	(5)
2026–	Molodechno	5	(0)
- * Club domestic league appearances and goals as of 29 August 2026

Aleksandr Yuryevich Shlyonkin (Russian: Александр Юрьевич Шлёнкин; born 12 October 2000) is a Russian football player who plays for Belarusian First League club Molodechno.

== Club career ==
He made his debut in the Russian Football National League for Tekstilshchik Ivanovo on 1 August 2020 in a game against Veles Moscow, as a starter.
