= Aleksey Kharitonovich =

Belarusian footballer

Personal information
- Date of birth: 30 April 1995 (age 31)
- Place of birth: Minsk, Belarus
- Height: 1.85 m (6 ft 1 in)
- Position: Goalkeeper

Team information
- Current team: Naftan Novopolotsk
- Number: 13

Youth career
- 2011–2013: Dinamo Minsk

Senior career*
| Years | Team | Apps | (Gls) |
| 2012–2014 | Dinamo Minsk | 0 | (0) |
| 2014 | → Bereza-2010 (loan) | 4 | (0) |
| 2015–2019 | Energetik-BGU Minsk | 78 | (0) |
| 2020–2023 | Belshina Bobruisk | 68 | (0) |
| 2024– | Naftan Novopolotsk | 61 | (0) |

International career^{‡}
| 2013 | Belarus U19 | 1 | (0) |
- * Club domestic league appearances and goals as of 6 July 2026 ‡ National team caps and goals as of 15 October 2013

Aleksey Kharitonovich (Belarusian: Аляксей Харытановіч; Russian: Алексей Харитонович; born 30 April 1995) is a Belarusian professional footballer who plays for Naftan Novopolotsk.
