= Stanislav Atrashkevich =

Belarusian footballer

Personal information
- Date of birth: 22 October 2002 (age 24)
- Place of birth: Minsk, Belarus
- Height: 1.81 m (5 ft 11 in)
- Position: Midfielder

Team information
- Current team: Molodechno
- Number: 22

Youth career
- 2018–2021: Isloch Minsk Raion

Senior career*
Years	Team	Apps	(Gls)
2021–2023	Isloch Minsk Raion	3	(0)
2022	→ Arsenal Dzerzhinsk (loan)	9	(0)
2023	→ Smorgon (loan)	12	(0)
2024	Arsenal Dzerzhinsk	10	(0)
2024–2025	Baranovichi	42	(0)
2026–	Molodechno	7	(0)
- * Club domestic league appearances and goals as of 6 July 2026

Stanislav Atrashkevich (Belarusian: Станіслаў Атрашкевіч; Russian: Станислав Атрашкевич; born 22 October 2002) is a Belarusian professional footballer who plays for Belarusian First League club Molodechno.
