= Ilya Branovets =

Belarusian professional footballer

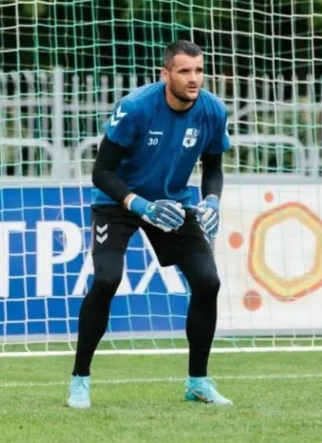

Personal information
- Date of birth: 16 April 1990 (age 36)
- Place of birth: Slutsk, Minsk Oblast, Belarusian SSR
- Position: Goalkeeper

Team information
- Current team: Slutsk
- Number: 30

Youth career
- SDYuSShOR Slutsk

Senior career*
Years	Team	Apps	(Gls)
2008–	Slutsk	152	(0)
2014	→ Volna Pinsk (loan)	9	(0)
- * Club domestic league appearances and goals as of 6 July 2026

Ilya Branovets (Belarusian: Ілья Бранавец; Russian: Илья Брановец; born 16 April 1990) is a Belarusian professional footballer who plays for Slutsk.
