= Yuriy Krot =

Belarusian footballer and coach

Personal information
- Date of birth: 28 May 1968 (age 58)
- Place of birth: Slutsk, Belarusian SSR
- Position: Midfielder

Senior career*
Years	Team	Apps	(Gls)
1985–1988	Dvina Novopolotsk		
1989–1991	Shakhtyor Soligorsk	18	(0)
1991–1993	Polkolor Piaseczno		
1993–1994	Shakhtyor Soligorsk	12	(3)
1994–1995	Chemlon Humenné	13	(0)
1997–1998	Shakhtyor Soligorsk	33	(6)
1999–2000	Granit Mikashevichi	45	(4)
2000–2001	Shakhtyor Soligorsk	0	(0)

Managerial career
- 2001–2005: Shakhtyor Soligorsk (reserves)
- 2005–2015: Slutsk
- 2019: Viktoriya Maryina Gorka
- * Club domestic league appearances and goals

Yuriy Krot (Belarusian: Юрый Крот; Russian: Юрий Крот; born 28 May 1968) is a former Belarusian footballer and currently a coach. From 2005 till 2015 he was a head coach of Slutsk, a team which he led from the regional amateur league to Belarusian Premier League.
