= FC Zhodino-Yuzhnoye =

Belarusian football club

Zhodino-Yuzhnoye
- Full name: Football Club Zhodino-Yuzhnoye
- Founded: 2011; 15 years ago
- Dissolved: 2024; 2 years ago
- Ground: Torpedo Stadium (reserve pitch), Zhodino
- Head Coach: Pavel Volchetskiy
- League: Belarusian First League
- 2023: Belarusian First League, 7th of 17

FC Zhodino-Yuzhnoye was a Belarusian football club based in Zhodino, Minsk Oblast. The club played in Belarusian First League, the second tier of Belarusian football.

== History ==
Zhodino-Yuzhnoye was founded in 2011. Since its foundation and until 2021 the club played at the amateur level in Minsk Oblast league and Minsk-based ALF league. In 2022 Zhodino-Yuzhnoye joined Belarusian Second League. After finishing in 5th place, the team got promoted to Belarusian First League by invitation from ABFF.

== Current squad ==
As of February 2024

Note: Flags indicate national team as defined under FIFA eligibility rules; some limited exceptions apply. Players may hold more than one non-FIFA nationality.

No.	Pos.	Nation	Player
1	MF	BLR	Anton Bahdanaw
5	GK	BLR	Pavel Silich
7	MF	BLR	Yevgeniy Smal
9	DF	BLR	Ilya Dzhugir
11	MF	BLR	Ilya Manayenkov
14	MF	BLR	Dmitriy Satsukevich
23	MF	BLR	Aleksandr Minko
46	MF	BLR	Stsyapan Makaraw
52	FW	BLR	Vladimir Chernukho

No.	Pos.	Nation	Player
58	MF	BLR	Ilya Zavadskiy
65	GK	BLR	Anton Shunto
67	DF	BLR	Andrey Kavalchuk
78	MF	BLR	Nikolay Makarevich
81	MF	BLR	Dmitriy Korolyonok
94	MF	BLR	Denis Simonchik
—	DF	BLR	Yury Ramanyuk
—	MF	BLR	Artur Kupreychik
