= FC Shakhtyor-2 Soligorsk =

Shakhtyor-2 Soligorsk
- Founded: 2020
- Dissolved: 2025
- Ground: Shakhtyor Stadium (Soligorsk) / Pripyat Stadium (Petrikov)
- Capacity: 2,000 / 800
- Manager: Dmitriy Danilevich
- League: Belarusian First League
- 2023: Belarusian First League, 16th of 17
Home colours	Away colours

FC Shakhtyor-2 Soligorsk was a football team from Soligorsk, Belarus, currently playing in the Belarusian First League. It was a farm club of FC Shakhtyor Soligorsk.

== History ==
The club was founded in 2020 as Shakhtyor Petrikov and joined the Belarusian Second League the same year. They finished second in their debut season, and made their Belarusian First League debut in 2021.

In 2024, after Belarusian Premier League Reserves Championship was abolished, the club was de facto merged with the Shakhtyor Soligorsk reserves team and transformed into Shakhtyor-2 Soligorsk.

== Current squad ==
As of February 2025

Note: Flags indicate national team as defined under FIFA eligibility rules; some limited exceptions apply. Players may hold more than one non-FIFA nationality.

No.	Pos.	Nation	Player
2	DF	RUS	Dmitry Selivanov
8	MF	BLR	Aleksey Kurovskiy
12	FW	BLR	Mark Bulanov
13	FW	BLR	Kirill Novik
16	GK	BLR	Daniil Kotov
17	FW	BLR	Nikita Shaula
22	DF	BLR	Artem Gerasim
29	DF	BLR	Roman Stesik
—	DF	BLR	Nikita Korshun

No.	Pos.	Nation	Player
—	DF	BLR	Kirill Tyamchik
—	MF	BLR	Nikita Akushko
—	MF	BLR	Yegor Borodin
—	MF	BLR	Artem Kurbachev
—	GK	BLR	Rustam Gurinovich
—	GK	BLR	Nikita Tsuba
—	DF	BLR	Gleb Sanikovich
—	MF	BLR	Mark Kobenko
