= FC Slutsk =

Belarusian association football club

Slutsk
- Full name: Football Club Slutsk-2024
- Nickname: Sakharniki (The Sugarmen)
- Founded: 1998; 28 years ago
- Ground: City Stadium, Slutsk
- Capacity: 1,896
- Owner: Slutsk District Executive Committee
- Head Coach: Aleksandr Gordeychik
- League: Belarusian First League
- 2025: Belarusian Premier League, 15th of 16 (relegated)
- Website: sfc-slutsk.by
Home colours	Away colours

FC Slutsk, officially Football Club Slutsk-2024 (Russian: Футбольный клуб «Слуцк-2024») and formerly SFC Slutsk, is a Belarusian association football club based in Slutsk, Minsk Oblast. Founded in 1998 with the backing of the local sugar refinery, the club spent twelve seasons in the Belarusian Premier League between 2014 and 2025 and attracted a global online following during the COVID-19 pandemic in 2020, when the Belarusian league was one of the few in the world still playing. Since early 2025 the club has been run as a state institution of the Slutsk District Executive Committee. As of the 2026 season, Slutsk play in the Belarusian First League, the second tier of Belarusian football.

== History ==
=== Origins and predecessor clubs ===
There was competitive football in Slutsk as early as 1913, with a Slutsk team entering the third season of the republican competition in 1926, but it did not enter a BSSR competition again until 1936. From the 1940s, the city of Slutsk was represented at a very low level by a team called Slutsk Spartak.

During World War 2, the city's football pitch was the site of "fierce battles" and extensive trench construction. In 1948, the city's executive committee decided to promote and fund football. The same year, the city stadium, originally built in 1935, was rebuilt. In addition to government funding, the city team was funded by the "trade union voluntary sports society and individual enterprises." Despite this, by 1974, the Slutsk team faced financial difficulties and dropped out of the BSSR republican championship. There were short-lived revivals in 1980 and the late 1980s before the city registered a self-supporting club in 1990. The name of the Slutsk team changed frequently in the 1990s, based on sponsorship.

In 1997, there was a new sports center in Slutsk funded by Nikolai Prudnik, of the local sugar refinery. The sports complex created a football team funded by Oleg Karanevsky, a physical educator. It was initially effectively a company team for the sugar plant, with all the players working for the plant, but later players from previous Slutsk representative teams joined. The coach was Alexander Dubitsky.

=== 1998–2019: Professionalisation and growth ===
The current team was founded in 1998 as Slutsksakhar Slutsk after success in local futsal and financial guarantees from the sugar refinery. Between 1998 and 2007, they played in the Minsk Oblast championship. In 2008, they joined the Belarusian Second League. In 2010, they finished in second place and were granted a promotion to the First League in 2011. In early 2011, the team changed its name to Slutsk. After becoming a "city club", initially all home matches were played at a stadium in Salihorsk. Starting in 2012, after the expansion of the Slutsk city stadium, with a new administrative building, new stands, and a pitch extension, the team began playing at their proper home ground. The pitch had initially been too small, as a running track around the field had been only 360 meters instead of the standard 400. In 2013, Slutsk became the league leader in home attendance. The town stadium would be further renovated in the 2014 season.

In 2014, the club signed Japanese player Yōsuke Saitō, who would score 7 goals in 17 games in his debut season.

In the 2015 off-season, Slutsk was one of the few Belarusian teams to play friendlies abroad, facing Danish and Russian clubs in Turkey.

In the following seasons, the club went through a series of management changes. In 2015, long-time head coach Yuriy Krot was fired, and replaced by Vyachaslaw Hryharaw, who was also a player. In 2017, Vitaliy Pavlov was appointed head coach.

The same year, Oleg Karanevsky, club chairman, was detained for allegedly taking a bribe.

In 2018, forward Yevgeny Shikavka was the first FC Slutsk player to represent Belarus at the national level.

=== 2020 season: global fame and fandom ===
In 2020, the club suffered a financial setback when the major sponsor, a local sugar refinery, withdrew after suffering losses. The decision was made by new management, since the former head was imprisoned.

FC Slutsk gained global media attention during the COVID-19 pandemic. As the Belarusian league was one of the few in the world still playing (along with Nicaragua and Tajikistan – and as of April 2020, Taiwan), an online following began around FC Slutsk, started by Australians who found the name funny. This led to coverage of the club by international media outlets including the BBC, The New York Times, NBC, the Australian Broadcasting Corporation, Russia Today, and the Süddeutsche Zeitung. The new fandom also had financial benefits: when the club's financial problems came to light, online fans raised "over $3,000 in less than two weeks" to help the club, and led to new sponsorship from Parimatch, a Ukrainian betting company. The movement also led to the adoption of a club song, "We love our Slutsk", composed by Andy Bajana and performed by Yury Trubila, which was played at home games starting in April 2020.

As of 2020, despite the reduction in financial support from the sugar factory, a majority of players continued to live "on the second floor of the sugar factory dormitory allocated for them".

On 30 June 2020, Slutsk manager Vitaly Pavlov was fired after an extended period of poor performances in the league. His replacement was Alexander Konchits. In October 2020, Konchits was replaced by Alexander Brazevich after the club slipped into the relegation zone.

On November 27, 2020, before the last game of the season against FC Smolevichi, Slutsk announced that most of the team had been diagnosed with COVID-19. Since the result would not affect the league standings, both teams agreed to cancel the game.

=== 2021–2025: Decline, nationalisation, and relegation ===
Slutsk remained in the top flight over the following seasons, finishing ninth in 2021, 11th in 2022, eighth in 2023 and ninth in 2024, with Aleksandr Gurinovich succeeding Aleksandr Brazevich as head coach in 2022.

While the pandemic-era online fandom around Slutsk became the topic of academic research as a case study for the sociology of sports fandom, many of the team's international fan partnerships broke down after the 2022 Russian invasion of Ukraine. Belarus is on the Russian side of the war and fan partnerships with Britain and Australia were seen by the government as contrary to the Belarusian cause. In addition, global viewership had already declined after pandemic lockdowns ended and other football outlets re-opened. In early 2025, the club was reorganised as a state-run institution and formally renamed Slutsk-2024.

In the 2025 season, Slutsk finished 15th of 16 and were relegated to the Belarusian First League, ending a twelve-season stay in the top division. Gurinovich left the club, and his assistant Aleksandr Gordeychik was appointed head coach in January 2026.

== Current squad ==
As of 25 August 2026

Note: Flags indicate national team as defined under FIFA eligibility rules; some limited exceptions apply. Players may hold more than one non-FIFA nationality.

No.	Pos.	Nation	Player
3	DF	BLR	Vadim Tseluyko
4	MF	BLR	Daniil Kirbay
5	DF	BLR	Artur Chuduk
6	DF	BLR	Artem Tolkin
8	MF	BLR	Arseniy Blotskiy (on loan from BATE Borisov)
9	MF	BLR	Vladislav Sychev
10	MF	BLR	Pavel Tseslyukevich
11	FW	BLR	Vladislav Fedosov
15	DF	BLR	Andrey Rum
16	DF	BLR	Alyaksey Syamyonaw
17	MF	BLR	Dmitry Nekrashevich
19	DF	BLR	Nikita Bylinkin
21	DF	BLR	Ignatiy Sidor

No.	Pos.	Nation	Player
23	MF	BLR	Pavel Kotlyarov (on loan from Slavia Mozyr)
25	MF	BLR	Vladislav Kulchitskiy
27	MF	BLR	Vadim Kurlovich
30	GK	BLR	Ilya Branovets
32	GK	BLR	Makar Sushchiy
35	GK	BLR	Nikita Robak (on loan from Neman Grodno)
44	DF	BLR	Andrey Shkondin (on loan from BATE Borisov)
45	FW	BLR	Vladislav Chebotar
71	MF	BLR	Andrey Kren
72	MF	BLR	Bogdan Kutsiy
77	MF	RUS	Arseniy Kontsedaylov
80	MF	BLR	Makar Litskevich
97	MF	BLR	Vyacheslav Papava

=== Out on loan ===
Note: Flags indicate national team as defined under FIFA eligibility rules; some limited exceptions apply. Players may hold more than one non-FIFA nationality.

No.	Pos.	Nation	Player
—	MF	BLR	Ivan Mikhnyuk (at BATE Borisov)

== League and Cup history ==
Season	Level	Pos	Pld	W	D	L	Goals	Points	Domestic Cup	Notes
2008	3	5th	30	15	6	9	53–37	51		
2009	3	4th	26	14	3	9	48–37	45	Round of 64	
2010	3	2nd	34	25	6	3	79–30	81	Round of 32	Promoted
2011	2	5th	30	13	10	7	44–33	49	Round of 32	
2012	2	5th	28	15	7	6	59–27	52	Round of 32	
2013	2	1st	30	19	9	2	54–19	66	Round of 32	Promoted
2014	1	9th	32	11	7	14	26–34	40	Round of 16	
2015	1	11th	26	6	7	13	26–30	25	Round of 16	
2016	1	12th	30	6	12	12	22–34	30	Quarter-finals	
2017	1	7th	30	12	8	10	30–34	44	Quarter-finals	
2018	1	8th	30	11	3	16	26–36	36	Quarter-finals	
2019	1	11th	30	9	7	14	29–46	34	Quarter-finals	
2020	1	14th	29	8	3	18	31–55	27	Round of 16	
2021	1	9th	30	9	8	13	36–44	35	Round of 16	
2022	1	11th	30	7	11	12	26–41	32	Quarter-finals	
2023	1	8th	28	9	8	11	38–40	35	Round of 16	
2024	1	9th	30	11	6	13	26–41	39	Quarter-finals	
2025	1	15th	30	5	6	19	20–51	21	Round of 16	Relegated

== Honours ==
- Belarusian First League
  - Champions (1): 2013

== Managers ==
- (Belarus) Yuriy Krot (2005–15)
- (Belarus) Vyachaslaw Hryharaw (2015–2016)
- (Belarus) Vitaliy Pavlov (2017–2020)
- (Belarus) Alexander Konchits (2020)
- (Belarus) Aleksandr Brazevich (2020–2022)
- (Belarus) Aleksandr Gurinovich (2022–2025)
- (Belarus) Aleksandr Gordeychik (2026–)
