= FC Maxline Vitebsk =

Belarusian football club

ML Vitebsk
- Full name: Football Club Maxline Vitebsk
- Short name: FCMLV
- Founded: 1983; 43 years ago 2014; 12 years ago (reformed)
- Ground: Vitebsky Central Sport Complex
- Capacity: 8,144
- Owner: Artem Leonov
- Head coach: Juan Díaz
- League: Belarusian Premier League
- 2025: BPL, 1st of 16 (champions)
- Website: fcml.by
Home colours	Away colours	Third colours

FC ML Vitebsk (Belarusian: ФК МЛ Віцебск, romanized: FK ML Viciebsk) is a Belarusian professional football club based in Vitebsk. Until 2023, the club represented Rahachow.

The club competes in the Belarusian Premier League, the top tier of Belarus football, following promotion from the 2024 Belarusian First League.

== Previous names ==
- 1983: Avtomobilist
- 1984–1987: KSM
- 1988–1997: Dnepr
- 1998–2000: Rogachev
- 2001: Rogachev-DYUSSh-1
- 2002–2006: Dnepr-DYUSSh-1
- 2007–2013: RMKK
- 2014–2016: Rogachev-MK
- 2017–2020: Dnepr
- 2021–2024: Maxline
- 2025–: ML Vitebsk

== History ==
The team was founded in 1983 as Avtomobilist Rogachev (Awtamabilist Rahachow, Belarusian: Аўтамабіліст) and was renamed to KSM Rogachev (KBM Rahachow, Belarusian: КБМ) next year. Since its foundation and until the dissolution of Soviet Union the team was playing in Belarusian SSR league. In 1988, they were renamed to Dnepr Rogachev (Dnyapro Rahachow, Belarusian: Дняпро Рагачоў).

In 1992, the team joined newly created Belarusian Second League, where they spent next six seasons. After successful 1996 season Dnepr was promoted to the First League. In 1998, they were renamed to FC Rogachev, in 2001, after partnering with local football academy, to Rogachev-DUSSh-1 and finally to Dnepr-DUSSh-1 Rogachev (Belarusian: Дняпро-ДЮСШ-1) in 2002.

The team spent nine seasons in First League until they finished at the last (16th) place in 2005 and were to be relegated back to the Second League. However, due to financial troubles, the team disbanded in early 2006.

Between 2007 and 2013 the amateur team representing Rahachow played in Gomel Oblast league. In 2014, the team reformed as MKK-Dnepr Rogachev (MKK-Dnyapro Rahachow, Belarusian: МКК-Дняпро) and rejoined Second League, before reverting to classic name Dnepr Rogachev (Dnyapro) in 2015.

=== Maxline takeover ===
In 2021, the team was re-branded into Maxline Rogachev, after being taken over by the eponymous betting company. In the fall of 2022, Maxline defeated Arsenal Dzerzhinsk in the promotion/relegation play-off and won the right to be promoted to Belarusian Premier League for the 2023 season. During the off-season, Maxline were denied Premier League license and stayed in the First League as the result. In early 2023 the club cut ties with Rahachow and relocated to Vitebsk with the intention of having better chances for promotion in the bigger city with better infrastructure. Maxline took second place in the 2024 Belarusian First League and won the right to play in the elite division.

On 29 December 2024, Maxline changed the name of the club to ML Vitebsk. The change is related to the licensing conditions for the Belarus teams in connection with their transition to the 2025 Belarusian Premier League. According to the rules of the Belarusian Football Federation, clubs cannot be called by the name of bookmakers before being promoted. Thus, Maxline had to shorten itself to two capital letters ML. To them they added Vitebsk, the name of the city where the team is based. On 23 November 2025, Maxline Vitebsk officially secured their first top-tier Belarusian title, after defeating FC Gomel 5–0 in Matchweek 29 in what was their final home game of the season.

== European record ==
Season	Competition	Round	Club	Home	Away	Aggregate
2026–27	UEFA Champions League	1QR	(Romania) Universitatea Craiova	1–4	0–1	1–5
2026–27	UEFA Conference League	2QR	(Montenegro) Sutjeska Nikšić	3–0	2–1	5–1
2026–27	UEFA Conference League	3QR	(Bosnia and Herzegovina) Borac Banja Luka	2–1 (a.e.t.)	0–1	2–2 (2–4 p)

== Current squad ==
As of 25 August 2026

Note: Flags indicate national team as defined under FIFA eligibility rules; some limited exceptions apply. Players may hold more than one non-FIFA nationality.

No.	Pos.	Nation	Player
1	GK	BLR	Pavel Pavlyuchenko
2	MF	BLR	Aleksey Nosko
3	DF	BLR	Nikita Baranok
4	MF	NGR	Ode Abdullahi
5	DF	IRI	Milad Mohammadi
6	DF	BLR	Kirill Gomanov
7	FW	RUS	Timur Ivanov
8	MF	CIV	Silas Gnaka
9	FW	MLI	Bassekou Diabaté
10	MF	NED	Denilho Cleonise
11	FW	JAM	Shamar Nicholson (on loan from Tijuana)
12	MF	SRB	Radivoj Bosić
15	MF	BLR	Valery Bocherov
18	DF	BLR	Vladislav Zhuk

No.	Pos.	Nation	Player
20	DF	BLR	Zakhar Volkov
21	DF	BLR	Nikita Naumov
22	DF	BLR	Yan Skibsky
23	DF	BLR	Syarhey Balanovich
27	MF	SRB	Aleksandar Mesarović
30	GK	BLR	Pavel Shcherbachenya
45	DF	BLR	Ilya Moskalenchik (on loan from Arsenal Tula)
46	GK	BLR	Daniil Kotov
55	MF	BLR	Valery Gromyko
66	DF	BLR	Sergey Karpovich
80	FW	BLR	Artem Kontsevoy
90	FW	BLR	Ivan Grudko (on loan from Slavia Mozyr)
99	FW	BLR	Mark Bulanov

=== Out on loan ===
Note: Flags indicate national team as defined under FIFA eligibility rules; some limited exceptions apply. Players may hold more than one non-FIFA nationality.

No.	Pos.	Nation	Player
14	MF	BLR	Ruslan Lisakovich (at Neman Grodno)
17	MF	BLR	Daniil Galyata (at Aris Limassol)
19	FW	RUS	Dmitri Selivanov (at Unixlabs)

No.	Pos.	Nation	Player
25	DF	BLR	Nikita Bykov (at Orsha)
33	DF	BLR	Kirill Muzychenko (at Baranovichi)
88	DF	BLR	Yegor Bozhko (at Arsenal Dzerzhinsk)

== Honours ==
=== Domestic ===
League

- Belarusian Premier League
  - Winners (1): 2025
- Belarusian First League
  - Runners-up: 2024
