= FC Ostrovets =

Belarusian football club

- Full name: Football Club Ostrovets
- Founded: 2019
- Ground: ASK Stadium, Ostrovets
- Capacity: 1,006
- Head Coach: Ivan Migal
- League: Belarusian First League
- 2025: Belarusian First League, 9th of 18
- Website: https://fco.by/

FC Ostrovets is a Belarusian football club based in Ostrovets, Grodno Oblast.

== History ==
FC Ostrovets founded in 2019 and joined Grodno Oblast league the same year. In 2020 FC Ostrovets joined Belarusian Second League.

In the 2021 season, FC Ostrovets won the Grodno Division, which is the preliminary stage of the Second League championship, with 23 wins in 24 matches. In October, the club won the final stage of the Belarusian championship in the Second League, defeating Maxline Rogachev in the final, and won the right to play in the Belarusian First League. Striker Aleksey Khodnevich set a record for the Second League in the number of goals scored in one season.

In 2022, FC Ostrovets made its debut in the First League.

== Current squad ==
As of 1 September 2026

Note: Flags indicate national team as defined under FIFA eligibility rules; some limited exceptions apply. Players may hold more than one non-FIFA nationality.

No.	Pos.	Nation	Player
1	GK	BLR	Ivan Frolov (on loan from Dinamo Minsk)
2	MF	BLR	Dmitry Merkulov
4	DF	BLR	Daniil Prudnik (on loan from Slavia Mozyr)
7	MF	BLR	Ilya Zaytsev
8	FW	BLR	Artyom Davidovich
9	MF	BLR	Aleksandr Fedosenko
10	MF	BLR	Kirill Goncharik
11	MF	RUS	Maksim Boychenko
13	MF	RUS	Arseny Snetkov
14	DF	RUS	Ivan Mokshin
15	MF	RUS	Timofey Statkevich (on loan from Unixlabs Minsk)
17	FW	BLR	Rodion Medvedev

No.	Pos.	Nation	Player
18	MF	BLR	Roman Davyskiba
19	MF	BLR	Yegor Mikhey
20	DF	BLR	German Zhernosek
21	MF	BLR	Artyom Kilyimanov
22	FW	BLR	Matvey Kalinovskiy (on loan from Dinamo Minsk)
25	MF	BLR	Artyom Gonzhurov
44	DF	BLR	Gleb Krivtsov
81	MF	BLR	Gleb Skripnik
82	GK	BLR	Vladislav Drozd (on loan from Isloch Minsk Raion)
88	FW	BLR	Nikita Yakimovich (on loan from Slavia Mozyr)
97	MF	BLR	Daniil Tsyk (on loan from Slavia Mozyr)
