= FC Torpedo-BelAZ Zhodino =

Association football club in Belarus

Torpedo-BelAZ
- Full name: ТАА «Футбольны клуб „Тарпеда-БелАЗ“» (TAA Futbol'ny klub Tarpyeda-BelAZ
- Founded: 1961; 65 years ago
- Ground: Torpedo Stadium, Zhodino, Belarus
- Capacity: 6,524
- Manager: Dzyanis Karolik (caretaker)
- League: Belarusian Premier League
- 2025: Belarusian Premier League, 6th of 16
- Website: torpedo-belaz.by
Home colours	Away colours

FC Torpedo-BelAZ Zhodino or FK Tarpeda-BelAZ Zhodzina (Belarusian: ФК Тарпеда-БелАЗ Жодзіна; Russian: Футбольный клуб Торпедо-БелАЗ Жодино, Futbolniy klub Torpedo-BelAZ Zhodino) is a Belarusian professional football club based in Zhodzina (Zhodino). They play in the Belarusian Premier League, the top division in Belarusian football. Their home stadium is Torpedo Stadium.

The club is sponsored by the city's machine building factory BelAZ.

== History ==
Name

- 1989: BelAZ Zhodino
- 1993: Torpedo Zhodino (Tarpeda Zhodzina)
- 2011: Torpedo-BelAZ Zhodino

== Honours ==
- Belarusian Cup
  - Winners: 2015–16, 2022–23
  - Runners-up: 2009–10, 2024–25
- Belarusian Super Cup
  - Winners: 2024
  - Runners-up: 2011, 2017
- Football Championship of the Belarusian SSR
  - Winners: 1970, 1971, 1980, 1981

== Current squad ==
As of 24 September 2026

Note: Flags indicate national team as defined under FIFA eligibility rules; some limited exceptions apply. Players may hold more than one non-FIFA nationality.

No.	Pos.	Nation	Player
1	GK	BLR	Sergey Ignatovich
3	DF	UKR	Yevhen Chahovets
4	DF	BLR	Vladimir Manayev
5	MF	BLR	Arseny Stanul
6	DF	BLR	Kirill Premudrov
7	MF	BLR	Artyom Bykov
8	MF	BLR	Maksim Budko
9	FW	ARM	Grenik Petrosyan
10	MF	BLR	Timofey Sharkovsky
11	MF	RUS	Aleksandr Lomovitsky
12	MF	BRA	Pedro Acácio
13	DF	BLR	Aleksey Zalesky
14	MF	BLR	Mikhail Ladutko
15	FW	BLR	Roman Zheleznyi
16	FW	NGR	Nnaji Agbo
18	MF	BLR	Nikita Korzun

No.	Pos.	Nation	Player
19	DF	BLR	Ilya Rutsky
20	DF	BLR	Grigoriy Martyanov
22	DF	BLR	Zakhar Baranok
25	GK	BLR	Timofey Yurasov
27	MF	BLR	Maksim Gaevoy
28	FW	UKR	Dmytro Yusov
30	MF	BLR	Vadim Pobudey
47	FW	BLR	Vladislav Nalivayko
66	DF	BLR	Arseny Ageyev (on loan from Lokomotiv Moscow)
68	MF	BLR	Danila Zhulpa
88	DF	BLR	Matvey Mikhayrin
89	FW	BLR	Aleksandr Frantsuzov (on loan from Lokomotiv Moscow)
90	FW	BLR	Nikita Matusevich
96	DF	BLR	Vladislav Melko
99	GK	BLR	Makar Maslenikov
—	DF	BLR	Matvey Pritsker

=== Out on loan ===
Note: Flags indicate national team as defined under FIFA eligibility rules; some limited exceptions apply. Players may hold more than one non-FIFA nationality.

No.	Pos.	Nation	Player
17	MF	BLR	Vladislav Krolik (at Naftan Novopolotsk)
21	FW	BLR	Vadim Kiselev (at Unixlabs Minsk)
—	DF	BLR	Matvey Sokolovsky (at Molodechno)

== League and Cup history ==
Season	Level	Pos	Pld	W	D	L	Goals	Points	Domestic Cup	Notes
1992	1st	13	15	5	0	10	13–31	10	Round of 32	
1992–93	1st	17	32	2	4	26	17–68	8	Round of 16	Relegated
1993–94	2nd	8	28	8	10	10	24–29	26	Round of 16	
1994–95	2nd	10	30	11	6	13	37–35	28	Round of 32	
1995	2nd	11	14	3	6	5	13–15	15	Round of 32	
1996	2nd	7	24	8	9	7	24–20	33	Round of 32	
1997	2nd	5	30	14	8	8	37–25	50	Round of 32	
1998	2nd	5	30	15	10	5	58–31	55	Round of 32	
1999	2nd	7	30	11	11	8	55–43	44	Round of 32	
2000	2nd	7	30	13	6	11	44–36	45	Round of 32	
2001	2nd	1	28	21	3	4	56–13	66	Round of 32	Promoted
2002	1st	5	26	13	4	9	38–27	43	Round of 32	
2003	1st	6	30	13	10	7	44–25	49	Round of 16	
2004	1st	4	30	19	2	9	57–28	59	Round of 16	
2005	1st	4	26	14	5	7	40–25	47	Round of 32	
2006	1st	11	26	7	9	10	21–27	30	Round of 16	
2007	1st	4	26	11	10	5	28–21	43	Quarterfinals	
2008	1st	13	30	7	10	13	25–36	31	Round of 32	
2009	1st	8	26	10	7	9	31–22	37	Round of 16	
2010	1st	11	33	7	7	19	33–58	28	Runners-up	
2010	1st		2	1	1	0	3–1	4	Runners-up	Relegation Play-off^{1}
2011	1st	6	33	9	14	10	37–41	41	Round of 32	
2012	1st	11	30	5	9	16	17–39	24	Round of 32	
2012	1st		2	1	0	1	4–1	3	Round of 32	Relegation Play-off^{2}
2013	1st	5	32	12	6	14	33–38	42	Semifinals	
2014	1st	4	32	13	11	8	38–30	50	Round of 16	
2015	1st	7	26	10	6	10	31–29	36	Round of 32	
2016	1st	5	30	13	9	8	47–33	48	Winner	
2017	1st	5	30	14	9	7	43–26	51	Round of 16	
2018	1st	5	30	16	7	7	36–18	55	Round of 16	
2019	1st	6	30	13	7	11	41–36	45	Quarterfinals	
2020	1st	3	30	16	8	6	55–37	56	Semifinals	
2021	1st	8	30	10	6	14	38–43	36	Quarterfinals	
2022	1st	8	30	11	10	9	35–32	43	Winner	
2023	1st	3	28	12	13	3	33–18	49	Semifinals	
2024	1st	3	30	18	8	4	45–21	62	Runners-up	
2025	1st	6	30	13	10	7	43–30	49	Quarterfinals	
2026									Round of 16	

- ^{1} Play-off for the 2011 Premier League spot against the 2010 First League runners-up SKVICH Minsk.
- ^{2} Play-off for the 2013 Premier League spot against the 2012 First League runners-up Gorodeya.

== Torpedo Zhodino in Europe ==
Season	Competition	Round	Club	Home	Away	Aggregate
2010–11	UEFA Europa League	1Q	(Iceland) Fylkir	3–0	3–1	6–1
2010–11	UEFA Europa League	2Q	(Serbia) OFK Beograd	0–1	2–2	2–3
2015–16	UEFA Europa League	1Q	(Albania) Kukësi	0–0	0–2	0–2
2016–17	UEFA Europa League	2Q	(Hungary) Debrecen	1–0	2–1	3–1
2016–17	UEFA Europa League	3Q	(Austria) Rapid Wien	0–0	0–3	0–3
2021–22	UEFA Europa Conference League	2Q	(Denmark) Copenhagen	0−5	1–4	1–9
2023–24	UEFA Europa Conference League	2Q	(Cyprus) AEK Larnaca	2–3	1−1	3–4
2024–25	UEFA Conference League	1Q	(Moldova) Milsami Orhei	2–4	0−0	2–4
2025–26	UEFA Conference League	1Q	(North Macedonia) Rabotnichki	3–0	1–0	4–0
2025–26	UEFA Conference League	2Q	(Israel) Maccabi Haifa	1−1	0−3	1−4

== Managers ==
- (Belarus) Yury Maleyew (July 15, 2004 – July 14, 2006)
- (Belarus) Uladzimir Zhuravel (interim) (July 1, 2006 – Nov 4, 2006)
- (Belarus) Oleg Kubarev (Nov 5, 2006 – Dec 13, 2009)
- (Belarus) Aleksandr Brazevich (Jan 11, 2010 – July 14, 2010)
- (Belarus) Aleksandr Lisovsky (interim) (July 15, 2010 – July 25, 2010)
- (Belarus) Sergei Gurenko (July 26, 2010 – May 4, 2012)
- (Belarus) Vadim Brazovsky (interim) (May 5, 2012 – July 28, 2012)
- (Belarus) Vadim Brazovsky (July 29, 2012 – Nov 2, 2012)
- (Belarus) Aleksandr Martyoshkin (interim) (Nov 3, 2012 – Nov 7, 2012)
- (Belarus) Igor Kriushenko (Nov 8, 2012–)
