= FC Molodechno =

Molodechno
- Full name: Футбольны клуб Маладзечна; Football Club Molodechno
- Founded: 1949/1989
- Ground: City Stadium; Maladzyechna, Belarus
- Capacity: 3,500
- Chairman: Vitaly Pachkovsky
- Manager: Yury Puntus
- League: Belarusian First League
- 2025: Belarusian Premier League, 16th of 16 (relegated)
Home colours	Away colours

FC Molodechno (Belarusian: ФК Маладзечна, romanized: FK Maladzyechna, Russian: ФК Молодечно) is a Belarusian professional football club based in Maladzyechna. They play in the Belarusian First League, the 2nd division in Belarusian football. Their home stadium is Molodechno City Stadium.

== History ==
=== Early history ===
The city of Molodechno was represented in the Belarusian SSR League since 1949 by various teams attached to local industries and organizations and thus having different names and loose continuity: Dinamo Molodechno (1949–1955), Molodechno Oblast team (1956, 1959), Molodechno city team (1957–1958), Spartak Molodechno (1960–1963, 1970–1971), Naroch Molodechno (1964–1965), Krasnoye Znamya Molodechno (1966), Volna Molodecno (1967–1969), Selena Molodechno (1972–1980), Metallist Molodechno (1981–1982), Trud Molodechno (1983–1985), Stankostroitel Molodechno (1986). Spartak Molodechno won the Belarusian SSR league in 1963. The modern FC Molodechno logo retroactively displays 1949 as the club's year of foundation.

=== Modern club ===
Metallurg Molodechno was formed in 1989 and in 1991, the young team won the Belarusian SSR Top League championship as well as the Soviet Amateur Cup. Since 1992, the team started playing in the Belarusian Premier League. In 1993, they were renamed to FC Molodechno. Their best result came in the 1994–95 season, when Molodechno finished 4th. In 1999, they finished 15th and relegated to the First League, but after winning the First League in 2000, they quickly came back to the top level in 2001. To celebrate the win, they changed their name to Molodechno-2000. They finished last and relegated to the First League again in 2003 and went further down to the Second League one season later. In 2006, they changed their name back to Molodechno. In 2011, the name was changed to Zabudova Molodechno after a merger with Zabudova Chist. In 2013, the merger was dissolved and the club was renamed to Molodechno-2013 and later to Molodechno-DYuSSh-4 in 2015. The club changed its name again in 2019 back to FC Molodechno.

==== Name changes ====
- 1989: FC Metallurg Molodechno (Metalurh Maladzyechna, Belarusian: Металург)
- 1993: FC Molodechno
- 2001: FC Molodechno-2000
- 2006: FC Molodechno
- 2011: FC Zabudova Molodechno (Забудова)
- 2013: FC Molodechno-2013
- 2015: FC Molodechno-DYuSSh-4 (Maladzyechna-DyuSSh-4, Belarusian: Маладзечна-ДЮСШ-4)
- 2019: FC Molodechno (FK Maladzyechna)

== Achievements ==
- SSR Belarusian League: 1

1991

- Soviet Amateur Cup: 1

1991

== Current squad ==
As of 1 September 2026

Note: Flags indicate national team as defined under FIFA eligibility rules; some limited exceptions apply. Players may hold more than one non-FIFA nationality.

No.	Pos.	Nation	Player
1	GK	BLR	Danila Tretyak
4	DF	BLR	Ilya Koval
5	DF	BLR	Vladislav Rusakov (on loan from Dinamo Minsk)
7	MF	BLR	Bogdan Levchenko (on loan from Neman Grodno)
8	MF	BLR	Dmitry Velisevich
9	FW	RUS	Yegor Shmarov
10	MF	BLR	Dmitry Volkovets (on loan from Dynamo Brest)
11	DF	BLR	Aleksandr Voronovich
12	DF	BLR	Denis Gruzhevsky
15	MF	BLR	Andrey Alshanik
17	DF	BLR	Vladislav Belashevich
18	FW	BLR	Aleksey Petrusevich
19	MF	BLR	Aleksandr Bakinovsky

No.	Pos.	Nation	Player
20	FW	BLR	Pavel Klenyo
21	MF	BLR	Matvey Sokolovsky (on loan from Torpedo-BelAZ Zhodino)
22	MF	BLR	Stanislav Atrashkevich
23	MF	BLR	Alyaksandr Katlyaraw
24	DF	BLR	Karen Vartanyan
29	DF	BLR	Timur Dubovik (on loan from Dinamo Minsk)
37	FW	RUS	Aleksandr Shlyonkin
43	GK	BLR	Oleg Diva
49	DF	BLR	Ivan Chernykh (on loan from BATE Borisov)
55	MF	BLR	Yegor Imeryakov
71	GK	BLR	Daniil Kasperovich
77	MF	BLR	Arseniy Yushkevich
78	MF	RUS	Fyodor Solovey
91	MF	BLR	Timur Mamedov

== League and Cup history ==
Season	Level	Pos	Pld	W	D	L	Goals	Points	Domestic Cup	Notes
1992	1st	9	15	5	5	5	11–12	15	Semi-finals	
1992–93	1st	13	32	7	10	15	34–40	24	Quarter-finals	
1993–94	1st	9	30	10	11	9	35–31	31	Semi-finals	
1994–95	1st	4	30	12	11	7	48–30	35	Quarter-finals	
1995	1st	5	15	8	1	6	33–19	25	Quarter-finals	
1996	1st	8	30	11	8	11	42–33	41	Quarter-finals	
1997	1st	13	30	7	9	14	28–44	30	Round of 16	
1998	1st	14	28	4	4	20	21–51	16	Quarter-finals	
1999	1st	16	30	2	5	23	21–71	11	Quarter-finals	Relegated
2000	2nd	1	30	23	5	2	76–16	74	Round of 16	Promoted
2001	1st	10	26	8	5	13	23–47	29	Round of 64	
2002	1st	13	26	3	3	20	23–59	13	Round of 16	
2003	1st	16	30	3	7	20	19–52	16	Round of 16	Relegated
2004	2nd	13	30	9	4	17	27–54	31	Round of 16	Relegated^{1}
2005	3rd	12	26	5	3	18	34–32	39	Round of 32	
2006	3rd	16	32	5	5	22	33–71	20	Round of 64	
2007	3rd	14	30	7	4	19	28–71	25	Round of 64	
2008	3rd	8	30	11	10	9	55–43	43	Round of 64	
2009	3rd	3	26	15	3	8	55–31	48	Round of 64	
2010	3rd	4	34	17	6	11	69–52	57	Round of 32	
2011	3rd	4	30	17	7	6	58–38	58	Round of 32	

- ^{1} Withdrew from the First League due to financial troubles.
