= List of Belarusian sportspeople =

This is a list of notable Belarusian sportspeople.

== Archery ==
- Yekaterina Mulyuk-Timofeyeva

== Athletics ==
- Igor Astapkovich
- Maryna Arzamasava
- Vadim Devyatovskiy
- Vladimir Dubrovshchik
- Vasiliy Kaptyukh
- Janina Karolchyk
- Andrei Krauchanka
- Aksana Miankova
- Andrei Mikhnevich
- Natallia Mikhnevich
- Yulia Nestsiarenka
- Natallia Sazanovich
- Alina Talay
- Ellina Zvereva

== Badminton ==
- Svetlana Zilberman

== Basketball ==
- Ivan Edeshko
- Tatyana Ivinskaya
- Yelena Leuchanka
- Natallia Marchanka
- Artsiom Parakhouski
- Roman Rubinshteyn
- Katsiaryna Snytsina
- Roman Sorkin
- Anastasiya Verameyenka
- Maalik Wayns

== Beach soccer ==
- Ihar Bryshtel

== Biathlon ==
- Alexei Aidarov
- Darya Domracheva
- Vladimir Drachev
- Liudmila Kalinchik
- Viktor Maigourov
- Olga Nazarova
- Sergey Novikov
- Svetlana Paramygina
- Nadzeya Pisarava
- Alexandr Popov
- Eugeni Redkine
- Oleg Ryzhenkov
- Vadim Sashurin
- Nadezhda Skardino
- Alexandr Syman
- Rustam Valiullin
- Ekaterina Vinogradova
- Olena Zubrilova

== Bodybuilding ==
- Vitaly Rudakovskiy

== Boxing ==
- Magomed Aripgadjiev
- Viktar Zuyev

== Canoeing ==
- Aliaksei Abalmasau
- Aliaksandr Bahdanovich
- Andrei Bahdanovich
- Leonid Geishtor
- Volha Khudzenka
- Artur Litvinchuk
- Vadzim Makhneu
- Iryna Pamialova
- Nadzeya Papok
- Vladimir Parfenovich
- Maryna Pautaran
- Raman Piatrushenka

== Cross-country skiing ==
- Sergei Dolidovich
- Leanid Karneyenka
- Svetlana Nageykina

== Cycling ==
- Natallia Tsylinskaya

== Football ==
- Yegor Alekseyenko
- Illya Aliyew
- Anton Bardok
- Maksim Belov
- Viktor Bezmen
- Inna Botyanovskaya
- Alyaksandr Buloychyk
- Vital Deykala
- Aleksey Dovgel
- Alyaksey Dvaretski
- Aleksandr Filanovich
- Yuriy Goltsev
- Alyaksandr Halowchyk
- Leanid Harai
- Alexander Hleb
- Artsyom Huzik
- Kirill Isachenko
- Yevgeni Kalinin
- Zarina Kapustina
- Yevgeniy Kostyukevich
- Vyacheslav Krivulets
- Sergey Kubarev
- Jemal Kurshubadze
- Vladislav Kuzhal
- Andrey Latypaw
- Dzyanis Lebedzew
- Pavel Lyutsko
- Uladzimir Malyshaw
- Maksim Moiseyev
- Dzyanis Myadzvedzew
- Vladislav Nikityanov
- Alyaksey Pohe
- Aleksandr Puzevich
- Dzmitry Rabtsaw
- Maksim Savostikov
- Artur Semenov
- Syarhey Shastakow
- Anton Shunto
- Artem Shut
- Alyaksandr Sobal
- Yury Stadolnik
- Aleksey Sychkov
- Alyaksey Tarabanaw
- Irina Tretyakova
- Ilya Ushakov
- Marat Voranaw
- Ihar Zanyamonets

== Freestyle skiing ==
- Dmitri Dashinski
- Aleksei Grishin
- Anton Kushnir
- Alla Tsuper
- Nikolai Kozeko

== Gymnastics ==
- Tatyana Ananko
- Olesya Babushkina
- Tatyana Belan
- Svetlana Boginskaya
- Liubov Charkashyna
- Anna Glazkova
- Maryna Hancharova
- Irina Ilyenkova
- Anastasia Ivankova
- Olga Korbut
- Maria Lazuk
- Nataliya Leshchyk
- Zinaida Lunina
- Glafira Martinovich
- Aliaksandra Narkevich
- Olga Puzhevich
- Yulia Raskina
- Ksenia Sankovich
- Vitaly Scherbo
- Alina Tumilovich
- Inna Zhukova

== Ice hockey ==
- Mikhail Grabovski
- Vyacheslav Gretsky
- Andrei Kostitsyn
- Sergei Kostitsyn
- Ruslan Salei
- Yegor Sharangovich

== Judo ==
- Anatoly Laryukov
- Ihar Makarau

== Modern pentathlon ==
- Pavel Dovgal

== Mountaineering ==
- Liliya Ianovskaia

== Rowing ==
- Yuliya Bichyk
- Tamara Davydenko
- Natallia Helakh
- Ekaterina Karsten
- Yelena Mikulich
- Aleksandra Pankina
- Yaroslava Pavlovich
- Valentina Skrabatun
- Nataliya Volchek
- Marina Znak

== Shooting ==
- Igor Basinsky
- Sergei Martynov
- Lalita Yauhleuskaya

== Speed skating ==
- Igor Zhelezovski

== Swimming ==
- Aleksandra Gerasimenya
- Ilona Katliarenka

== Table tennis ==
- Veronika Pavlovich
- Viktoria Pavlovich
- Vladimir Samsonov

== Tennis ==
- Victoria Azarenka
- Olga Govortsova
- Max Mirnyi
- Tatiana Poutchek
- Aryna Sabalenka
- Aliaksandra Sasnovich
- Vladimir Voltchkov
- Natasha Zvereva

== Volleyball ==
- Georgy Mondzolevski
- Yuri Sapega

== Weightlifting ==
- Henadzi Aliashchuk
- Andrei Aramnau
- Hanna Batsiushka
- Liubou Bialova
- Iryna Kulesha
- Sergey Lavrenov
- Nastassia Novikava
- Andrei Rybakou
- Maryna Shkermankova
- Tatsiana Stukalava

== Wrestling ==
- Dmitry Debelka
- Murad Haidarau
- Sergey Lishtvan
- Viachaslau Makaranka
- Aleksandr Medved
- Aleksey Medvedev
- Aleksandr Pavlov
- Valery Shary
- Mikhail Siamionau
- Valery Tsilent

== See also ==
- Belarus at the Olympics
- Sport in Belarus
- List of Belarusians
