= Aliyev =

Aliyev (sometimes spelled Aliev, Aliew, Aliyew, Eliyev, or Iliyev; Azerbaijani: Əliyev, Kazakh: Áliyev, Russian: Алиев), Aliyeva for females, is a surname originating from the Caucasus and Central Asia. The surname is a Russian-language patronymic derivation from both Hebrew and the Arabic male given names, Aliyah meaning "ascent" in Hebrew, Ali meaning "highness" in Arabic and Eli meaning "My God" in Hebrew.

Notable people with the surname include:

== Aliyev ==
- Abulfaz Aliyev (1938-2000), commonly referred to as Abulfaz Elchibey, former President of Azerbaijan
- Ali Aliyev (boxer), a Russian amateur boxer
- Ali Aliyev (footballer) a Kazakh footballer
- Aydin Aliyev, Chairman of the State Customs Committee of Azerbaijan Republic
- Aziz Aliyev, politician, scientist, and member of the Supreme Soviet of the USSR, father-in-law of Heydar Aliyev and maternal grandfather of Azerbaijan's current President Ilham Aliyev
- Heydar Aliyev (1923–2003), former President of Azerbaijan
- Heydar Aliyev Jr., son of Ilham Aliyev
- Igrar Aliyev, Azerbaijani historian
- Ilham Aliyev (born 1961), current President of Azerbaijan, son of Heydar Aliyev
- Mamed Aliyev (1934 - 2004 ), was a recipient of the Order of the Badge of Honour, an Honorary Railwayman Badge of the USSR, and a Veteran of Labour
- Mirzaagha Aliyev, Azerbaijani actor
- Mukhu Aliyev, president of the Republic of Dagestan, Russia
- Natig Aliyev, politician, Minister of Industry and Energy of Azerbaijan
- Oleksandr Aliyev, Ukrainian footballer
- Rakhat Aliyev, former First Vice Foreign Minister of Kazakhstan and son-in-law of former president Nursultan Nazarbayev
- Rauf Aliyev (born 1989), Azerbaijani footballer
- Tofig Aliyev (born 2004), Azerbaijani trampolinist
- Yashar Aliyev, Azerbaijan's current ambassador to the United States
- Vagif Aliyev, Mayor of Sumgayit, Azerbaijan
- Salau Aliyev, Kumyk politician

== Aliev ==
- Dmitri Aliev, Russian figure skater

== Aliyew ==
- Illya Aliyew, Belorussian football player

== Aliyeva ==
- Aysun Aliyeva (born 1997), Azerbaijani women's footballer
- Dilara Aliyeva, Azerbaijani women's rights activist
- Hokuma Aliyeva (1991–2024), Azerbaijani flight attendant, recognised as a National Hero of Azerbaijan
- Kamila Aliyeva, Azerbaijani politician
- Leyla Aliyeva, Azerbaijani politician, daughter of Ilham Aliyev
- Mehriban Aliyeva, vice president of Azerbaijan, wife of Ilham Aliev and first lady
- Nargiz Aliyeva (born 2002), Azerbaijani women's footballer
- Saadat Aliyeva, Azerbaijani scientist, rector of Azerbaijan University
- Ulduz Rafili-Aliyeva, Azerbaijani theatre director
- Alena Aliyeva, wife of Heydar Aliyev Jr., the son of Ilham Aliyev

== Alieva ==
- Dinara Alieva (born 1980), Azerbaijani and Russian opera singer
- Marina Alieva, Russian female singer, actress, dancer and songwriter
