= Jemal =

Jemal, Djemal or Dzhemal (Georgian: ჯემალ, (Arabic: جمل) may refer to the following notable people:

Given name

- Jemal Azmi (1868–1922), Ottoman politician
- Jemal Gokieli (1920–1991), Georgian conductor
- Jemal Gubaz (born 1968), football player from Abkhazia
- Jemal Inaishvili, the Deputy Chairman of the Parliament of Georgia
- Jemal Johnson (born 1985), American-English football player
- Dzhemal Kherhadze (1945–2019), Georgian football player and coach
- Jemal Kurshubadze (born 1997), Belarusian football player
- Jemal Gamakharia (born 1949), Georgian politician
- Dzhemal Kyzylatesh (born 1994), Turkish-born Ukrainian football midfielder
- Djemal Pasha (1872–1922), Ottoman Turkish military leader
- Jemal Singleton (born 1975), American football coach
- Jemal Tabidze (born 1996), Georgian football player
- Jemal Zeinklishvili (1937–2011), Georgian football player
  - Jemal Zeinklishvili Stadium, multi-use stadium in Borjomi, Georgia

Surname

- Ahmedin Jemal, American cancer epidemiologist
- Ali Jemal (born 1990), Tunisian football goalkeeper
- Ammar Jemal (born 1987), Tunisian football player who, is playing for Etoile du Sahel
- Douglas Jemal (born 1942), American real estate developer
- Geydar Dzhemal (1947–2016), Russian Islamic public figure, activist, philosopher and poet

== See also ==
- Jamal
