= Alyaksey =

Alyaksey (Belarusian: Аляксей; also spelled Aliaksiej) is a Belarusian masculine given name. It is a derivative of Alexey. Notable individuals with the name include:

- Aleksey Baga (born 1981), Belarusian football coach and player
- Alyaksey Belavusaw (born 1976), Belarusian footballer
- Alyaksey Dvaretski (born 1977), Belarusian football coach and player
- Aleksey Gavrilovich (born 1990), Belarusian footballer
- Alyaksey Ivanow (born 1997), Belarusian football coach
- Alyaksey Kazlow (born 1989), Belarusian footballer
- Alyaksey Khaletski (born 1984), Belarusian football coach and player
- Alyaksey Krawchanka (born 1985), Belarusian football coach and player
- Aleksei Kulbakov (born 1979), Belarusian football referee
- Aleksey Legchilin (born 1992), Belarusian footballer
- Alyaksey Martynets (born 1985), Belarusian footballer
- Alyaksey Merkulaw (born 1972), Belarusian football player and coach
- Alyaksey Pankavets (born 1981), Belarusian footballer
- Alyaksey Paznyak (born 1981), Belarusian footballer
- Alyaksey Plyasunow (born 1991), Belarusian footballer
- Alyaksey Pohe (born 1977), Belarusian footballer
- Alyaksey Pyatrow (born 1991), Belarusian footballer
- Aleksey Rios (born 1987), Belarusian footballer
- Aliaksiej Skoblia (1990–2022), Belarusian soldier who died fighting for Ukraine in the 2022 Russian invasion of Ukraine
- Aliaksiej Sokal (born 1973), Belarusian communist politician
- Alyaksey Suchkow (born 1981), Football player
- Alyaksey Tarabanaw (born 1984), Belarusian footballer
- Aliaksei Tsapik (born 1988), Belarusian track and field athlete
- Alyaksey Tsimashenka (born 1986), Belarusian footballer
- Alyaksey Vasilewski (born 1993), Belarusian footballer
- Alyaksey Yanushkevich (born 1986), Belarusian footballer
