= Otis Brawley =

American physician

Otis Webb Brawley
- Education: University of Chicago, Pritzker School of Medicine
- Known for: Work on cancer
- Awards: Key to St. Bernard Parish, Georgia Cancer Coalition Scholar, Member of the National Academy of Medicine
- Scientific career
- Fields: Oncology and Epidemiology
- Workplaces: Johns Hopkins University

Otis Webb Brawley is an American physician and the Bloomberg Distinguished Professor of Oncology and Epidemiology at Johns Hopkins University. He served as Chief Medical and Scientific Officer and Executive Vice President of the American Cancer Society from July 2007 to November 2018. He is board certified in internal medicine and medical oncology and is a Master of the American College of Physicians, Fellow of the American Society of Clinical Oncology, and a Fellow of the American College of Epidemiology. He is a member of the Institute of Medicine now known as the National Academy of Medicine.

== Biography ==
Brawley is a native of Detroit. He is a graduate of the University of Detroit Jesuit High School, the University of Chicago, and its Pritzker School of Medicine. He completed a residency in internal medicine at University Hospitals of Cleveland, Case-Western Reserve University, and a fellowship in medical oncology at the National Cancer Institute. As the chief medical and scientific officer and executive vice president of the American Cancer Society, Brawley was responsible for promoting the goals of cancer prevention, early detection, and quality treatment through cancer research and education. He is Professor of haematology, medical oncology, medicine and epidemiology at Emory University. He is also a medical consultant to the Cable News Network (CNN). From 2001 to 2007, he was medical director of the Georgia Cancer Center for Excellence at Grady Memorial Hospital in Atlanta, and deputy director for cancer control at the Winship Cancer Institute at Emory University. He has also previously served as a member of the Society's Prostate Cancer Committee, co-chaired the U.S. Surgeon General's Task Force on Cancer Health Disparities, and filled a variety of positions at the National Cancer Institute (NCI), most recently serving as assistant director. Brawley serves on the Board of Regents of the Uniformed Services University of the Health Sciences. He has served as a member of the Food and Drug Administration Oncologic Drug Advisory Committee, the Centers for Disease Control and Prevention Breast and Cervical Cancer Early Detection and Control Advisory Committee and chaired the NIH Consensus Panel on the Treatment of Sickle Cell Disease. Among numerous other awards, he was a Georgia Cancer Coalition Scholar and received the Key to St. Bernard Parish for his work in the U.S. Public Health Service in the aftermath of Hurricane Katrina. In 2011, Brawley joined the International Prevention Research Institute as Senior Research Fellow. In 2022, he was listed on STAT's inaugural STATUS List, "the most definitive and consequential accounting of important and impactful leaders in the life sciences."

Brawley works to reduce overscreening of medical conditions.

== Awards ==
- 2022 STAT's STATUS List
- 2019 American Medical Association (AMA) Distinguished Service Award
- 2019 University of Chicago Alumni Professional Achievement Award
- 2018 Martin D. Abeloff Award for Excellence in Public Health and Cancer Control, Maryland State Council of Cancer Control
- 2015 Elected Member of the National Academy of Medicine
- 2015 Named a Master of the American College of Physicians
- 2013 Special Recognition Award from the American Society of Clinical Oncology
- 2009 AACR-Minorities in Cancer Research Jane Cooke Wright Lecture
- Fellow of the American Society of Clinical Oncology
- Fellow of the American College of Epidemiology

== Books ==
Otis Brawley wrote the 2012 book, How We Do Harm: A Doctor Breaks Ranks About Being Sick in America

== Selected publications ==
- 2011 with R Siegel, E Ward, A Jemal, Cancer statistics, 2011: the impact of eliminating socioeconomic and racial disparities on premature cancer deaths, in CA: A Cancer Journal for Clinicians. Vol. 61, nº 4; 212–236.
- 2012 with MM Center, A Jemal, J Lortet-Tieulent, E Ward, J Ferlay, F Bray, International variation in prostate cancer incidence and mortality rates, in European Urology. Vol. 61, nº 6; 1079–1092.
- 2015 with KC Oeffinger, ETH Fontham, R Etzioni, A Herzig, JS Michaelson, YCT Shih, LC Walter, TR Church, CR Flowers, SJ LaMonte, AMD Wolf, C DeSantis, J Lortet-Tieulent, K Andrews, D Manassaram-Baptiste, D Saslow, RA Smith, R Wender, Breast cancer screening for women at average risk: 2015 guideline update from the American Cancer Society, in JAMA. Vol. 314, nº 15; 1599–1614.
- 2012 with PB Bach, JN Mirkin, TK Oliver, CG Azzoli, DA Berry, T Byers, GA Colditz, MK Gould, JR Jett, AL Sabichi, RSmith-Bindman, DE Wood, A Qaseem, FC Detterbeck, Benefits and harms of CT screening for lung cancer: a systematic review, in JAMA. Vol. 307, nº 22; 2418–2429.
- 2010 with GL Andriole, DG Bostwick, LG Gomella, M Marberger, F Montorsi, CA Pettaway, TL Tammela, C Teloken, DJ Tindall, MC Somerville, TH Wilson, IL Fowler, RS Rittmaster, Effect of dutasteride on the risk of prostate cancer, in New England Journal of Medicine. Vol. 362; 1192–1202.
