= Leanid =

Belarusian masculine given name

Leanid (Belarusian: Леанід) is a masculine first name of Belarusian origin. It is derived from the Greek Leonidas. Notable individuals with the surname include:

- Leanid Harai (1937–2019), Belarusian-Soviet footballer and manager
- Leanid Karneyenka (born 1987), Belarusian cross-country skier
- Leonid Kovel (born 1986), Belarusian football player and football coach
- Leanid Lahun (born 1978), Belarusian football player and coach
- Leanid Marakou (1958–2016), Belarusian journalist and writer
- Leanid Sudalenka (born 1966), Belarusian human rights lawyer

== See also ==
- Leonid
