= Kostyukevich =

Kostyukevich (Belarusian: Касцюкевіч, Russian: Костюкевич) is an East Slavic language surname.

Notable people with the surname include:

- Frants Kostyukevich (born 1963), male race walker who represented the USSR and later Belarus
- Lyudmila Kostyukevich (1964), Belarusian former speed skater
- Yevgeniy Kostyukevich (born 1989), Belarusian former professional footballer
