= Gokieli =

Gokieli (Georgian: გოკიელი) is a Georgian surname. Notable people with the surname include:

- Elene Gokieli (1918–1992), Georgian hurdler
- Jemal Gokieli (1920–1991), Georgian conductor
