= Ryabtsev =

Ryabtsev or Rabtsaw (Russian: Рябцев) is a Slavic masculine surname, its feminine counterpart is Ryabtseva or Rabtsaw. It may refer to

- Anton Rabtsaw (born 1987), Belarusian football player
- Dzmitry Rabtsaw (born 1991), Belarusian football player
- Sergey Ryabtsev (born 1958), Russian musician
- Vladislav Ryabtsev (born 1987), Russian rower
- Zhanna Ryabtseva (born 1977), Russian politician
