= President Aliyev =

President Aliyev may refer to:

- Heydar Aliyev (1923–2003), third president of Azerbaijan (1993–2003)
- Ilham Aliyev (born 1961), fourth president of Azerbaijan (since 2003) and son of the third president

== See also ==
- Aliyev, a surname
