= Alijevas =

Alijevas is a Lithuanian-language rendering of the surname Aliyev. Notable people with the surname include:

- Rolandas Alijevas, Lithuanian professional basketball player of Azeri descent
- Goda Alijeva, Lithuanian singer from the vocal pop music girl group 69 Danguje
