= Salahaddin Khalilov =

Azerbaijani philosopher

- Xəlilov Səlahəddin Sədrəddun oğlu
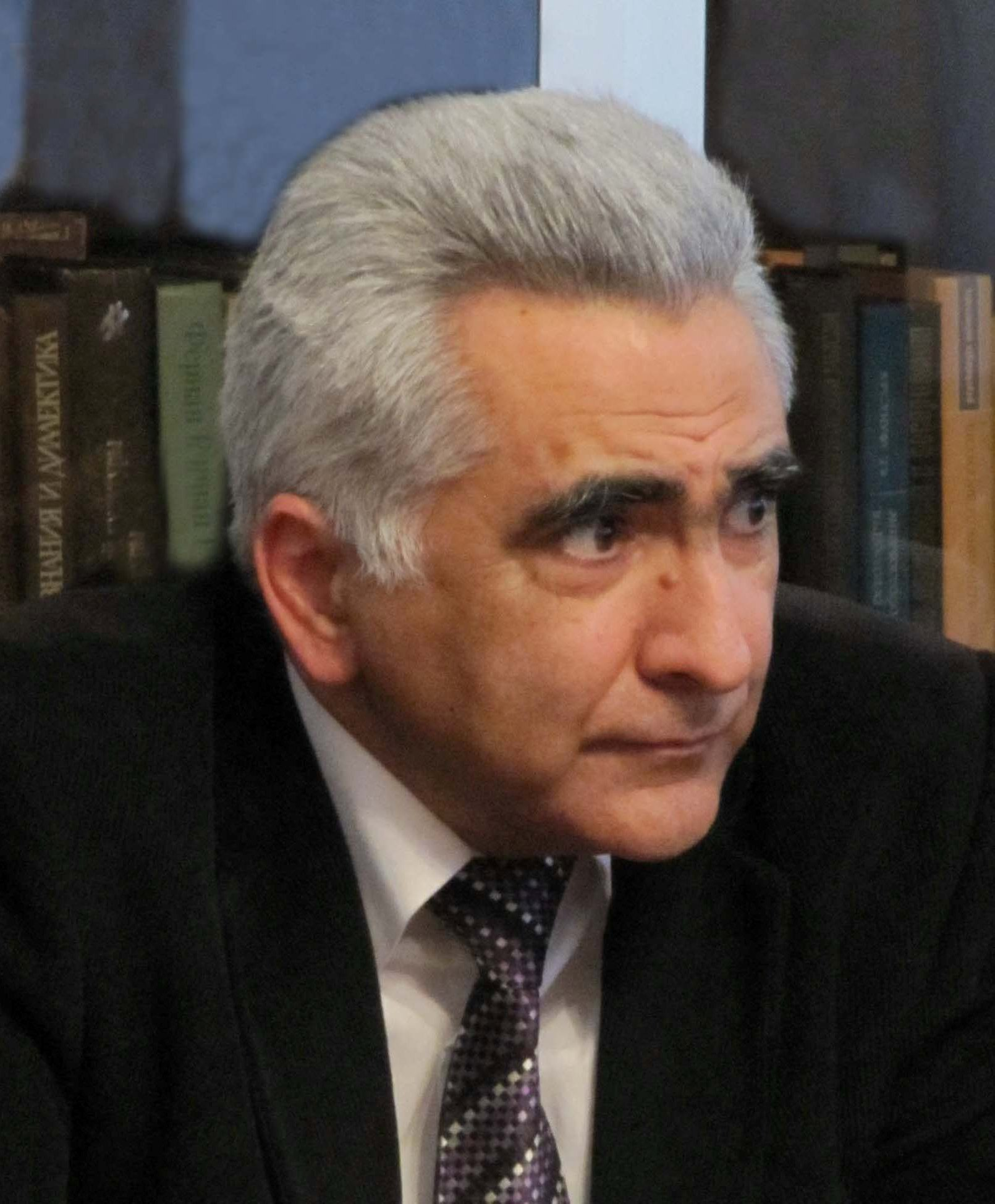
- Citizenship: Azerbaijan

Salahaddin Khalilov (Azerbaijani: Səlahəddin Sədrəddun oğlu Xəlilov) is an Azerbaijani philosopher.

== Scientific-pedagogical activity ==
He defended his PhD (Candidate of Sciences) thesis titled “Systematic Structural Analysis of Scientific and Technological Progress in the USSR” in 1976. After completing his postdoctoral research he defended a thesis titled “Logico-gnoseological issues of Scientific and Technological Progress” in 1989. In the same year, he became a professor and the head of the Philosophy Department at Azerbaijan State Pedagogical University. He founded Azerbaijan University, a private university in Azerbaijan, in 1991, and was its rector until 2006. Since 1994, he has been leading the research center East and West. Khalilov established the international socio-political journal “Ipek Yolu” (The Silk Road) in 1997 and was its Editor-in-Chief until 2005. In 2002, he was elected as the Chairman of the Presidium of the Azerbaijan Association of Philosophy and Socio-Political Sciences (AFSEA). Since 2003, he has been the Editor-in-Chief of the journal “Felsefe ve Sosial-siyasi Elmler” (Philosophy and Socio-Political Sciences). Since 2006, he has been a member of the Presidium of the Higher Attestation Commission under the President of the Republic of Azerbaijan. In 2007, Prof. Khalilov was elected as the Corresponding-Member of the Azerbaijan National Academy of Sciences.

Khalilov’s investigations are mainly focused on Philosophy of Science, Philosophical Comparativism, Phenomenology, Philosophical Aspects of Eastern and Western Civilizations, Philosophy of Abu Turkhan, and Cognitive Theory.

== Social and educational activity ==
Khalilov founded the Junior Physicists School in Azerbaijan in 1972. He was elected as the Chairman of Young Scientists at Azerbaijan State Pedagogical University in 1981, and in 1988 he was elected as the Chairman of Young Humanity Scientists of Azerbaijan.

Khalilov was the a member of the Parliament of Azerbaijan and Deputy-Chairman of the "Science and Education" Permanent Commission of the Parliament from 2000 to 2005.

== Selected publications ==
- Osnovaniya nauchno-technicheskogo progressa. Logiko-metodologicheskiy analiz. (Basics of scientific and technological progress. Logical and methodological analysis) “Rossiskaya Ekologicheskaya Akademiya”, Ekonomika i informatika. Moskva 1997 (in Russian).(ISBN 5-89345-003-5)
- Peculiarities of Education in the East and West. XIIth Triennial Conference, Touchstones for a Modern University Culture, Brussels, 11–14 July 1999.
- East-West: science, education, religion. «Azerbaycan Universiteti”, 2000
- The structure of knowledge: about a process of formation of the hierarchic. Proceedings of the Metaphysics for the Third Millennium Conference. September 5–8, 2000, Rome. Vol.2, pp. 89–93. (ISBN 9978-09-009-6)
- Problems of Education in the Post-Soviet Era. Alliance of Universities for Democracy. Perspectives in Higher Education Reform. Budapest, Volume 9, 2000, pp. 121–124.
- Civilization, Religion, and Terror. Proceedings of the Alliance of Universities for Democracy.// Perspectives in Higher Education Reform. Volume 12, Bucharest, November 2002, pp. 227–231. (ISBN 1-881515-52-4)
- The unity of diversity as the basic principle of the western model of social organization. Proceedings of the Second world Conference: Metaphysics 2003. July 2–5, 2003, Rome. Vol.1, pp. 218–222.
- Sherg ve Gerb: umumbesheri ideala dogru. (East and West: to the universal ideal) Baki 2004 (in Azerbaijani). (ISBN 9952-8050-0-4)
- Tehsil, telim, terbiye. Baki 2005 (Education, training, attitude development) (in Azerbaijanian). (ISBN 9952-8050-1-2)
- ﺪﻮﻏﺮﻮ ﻻ ﺋﻴﺎ ﺍﻴﺪ ﺷﺭﻕ ﻭ ﻏﺮﺏ. ﻋﻮﻤﻭﻡ ﺑﺸﺭﻯ. Tehran, «Behreng», 2005.
- East and West as social models. Global Studies Encyclopedia."Dialog Raduga Publishers", Moscow 2003, p. 116. (ISBN 5-05-005719-1)and in Global Studies Encyclopedia. Prometheus Books, N-Y. 2005. (ISBN 1-59102-435-8)
- Al-Suhrawardi’s Doctrine and Phenomenology. Islamic Philosophy and Occidental Phenomenology on the Perennial Issue of Microcosm and Macrocosm. Dordrecht, Springer, 2006, pp. 263–276. (ISBN 978-1-4020-4114-3 (HB); ISBN 978-1-4020-4115-0 (e-book))
- Peculiarities of Education in the East and West. Proceedings of the XXIst World Congress of Philosophy: August 10–17, 2003, Istanbul, Turkey. In Volume 4. Philosophy of Education. Ankara, 2006, pp. 73–77. (ISBN 975-7748-34-X (TK No);ISBN 975-7748-36-6 (4.C))
- Soul and Body in the Phenomenological Context. Phenomenology of Life – From the Animal Soul to the Human Mind Book II. The Human Soul in the Creative Transformation of the Mind. Series: Analecta Husserliana, Vol. 94 Tymieniecka, Anna-Teresa (Ed.), 2006, pp. 189–200. (ISBN 978-1-4020-5181-4 (HB); ISBN 978-1-4020-5182-1 (e-book))
- Felsefe: tarix ve muasirlik (felsefi komparativistika). (Philosophy: history and modernity) Baki 2006 (in Azerbaijani). (ISBN 9952-8050-2-0)
- Doğu-Batı: Ortak Bir Ideale Doğru. “Mefkure yayınları”, İstanbul, 2006. (in Turkish). (ISBN 994-4553-91-3)
- Meneviyyat felsefesi. Baki 2007 (Philosophy of morality) (in Azerbaijani).
- Philosophy, science, culture. Their peculiarities in the East and the West. (Foreword by Prof.Anna-Teresa Tymieniecka). CA&CC Press©, Stockholm 2008. (ISBN 978-91-976993-2-7 (hardback); ISBN 978-91-976993-3-4 (paperback)).
- Doğu ́dan Batı ́ya Felsefe Körpüsü. “Ötüken”, İstanbul 2008. (in Turkish). (ISBN 978-975-437-693-7)
- Lyubov i intellekt. (Love and intellect) Моskva, “Маsка”, 2009. (in Russian). (ISBN 978-5-91146-346-5)
- Romanticheskaya poeziya v kontekste vostochno-zapadnoy problematiki. (Romantic poetry in the context of East-West problematique) Moskva. “Ves Mir”, 2009. (in Russian). (ISBN 978-5-7777-0456-6)
- Romantik şiirde Doğu-Batı meseleleri. “Ötüken”, İstanbul 2009. (in Turkish). (ISBN 978-975-437-746-0)
- About the correlation of the memory and remembrance in the structure of the soul. Analecta Husserliana. v. CI. // Memory in the ontopoiesis of life. Springer, 2009. pp. 243–252. (ISBN 978-90-481-2317-9 (HB); e-ISBN 978-90-481-2501-2)
- Sivilizasiyalarin dialoqu. (Dialogue of civilizations) Baki 2009 (in Azerbaijani). (ISBN 978-9952-25-126-5)
- Elm adamlari elm haqqinda. (Scientists about science) Baki 2010 (in Azerbaijani). (ISBN 978-9952-27-185-0)
- Elmshunasligin esaslari. (Basics of science about science) Baki 2010 (in Azerbaijani).
- Elm haqqında elm. (Science about Science) Bakı, 2011 (in Azerbaijani).
- Əbu Turxanın hikmət dünyası.(Abu Turkhan's World of Wisdom) Bakı, 2012 (in Azerbaijani).
- Книга афоризмов. Избранное из избранных. (Book of aphorisms. Favorites from favorites), Moskva: «Alfa-M», 2012 (in Russian).
- Phenomenology of Life or Life of Idea. Baku, “Azerbaijan University” Press, 2012.
