= Liliya Ianovskaia =

Belarusian-Canadian mountaineer

- Ianovskaia in 2024

Personal information
- Native name: Лілія Іванаўна Яноўская
- Born: August 6, 1959 (age 67) Ivyanyets, Byelorussian SSR, Soviet Union
- Education: Belarusian State University
- Occupations: Mountaineer, businesswoman
- Website: liliyaianovskaia.ca

Climbing career
- Type of climber: High-altitude mountaineering
- Major ascents: Mount Everest (2022); K2 (2022); Kangchenjunga (2026); Nanga Parbat (2026)
- Known for: Oldest woman to summit K2; Oldest woman to climb Everest and K2; 11 of the 14 eight-thousanders
- Updated on October 30, 2026

Liliya Ianovskaia (Belarusian: Лілія Іванаўна Яноўская, romanized: Lilija Ivanaŭna Janoŭskaja; born August 6, 1959) is a Belarusian-born Canadian mountaineer. She took up climbing at the age of 50 and, as of 2026, has climbed 11 of the 14 eight-thousanders.

On July 22, 2022, at the age of 62 years and 350 days, Ianovskaia became the oldest woman to summit K2, the world's second-highest mountain, and the first Canadian woman to do so. Guinness World Records lists her as the oldest woman to climb K2 and as the oldest woman to have climbed both Mount Everest and K2, which she summited about two months apart in 2022. She has also been reported as the oldest woman to have summited Dhaulagiri (2023), Annapurna I (2025), Kangchenjunga (2026) and Nanga Parbat (2026).

Ianovskaia is the author of the 2026 clibing book, Above All: A Memoir of Mountains and the Women Who Climbed Them.

== Early life and emmigration ==
Ianovskaia was born on August 6, 1959, in Ivyanyets, in what was then the Byelorussian SSR, and grew up in Minsk. As a teenager she was drawn to mountaineering through books and the stories of Polish climbers, in particular Wanda Rutkiewicz. She graduated from the Faculty of Mathematics of the Belarusian State University and later obtained a second qualification in financial analysis.

In 1995, Ianovskaia and her husband, Vladimir, founded a hardwood flooring business, Coswick Hardwood, in Zaslawye, Belarus. In 1998, at the age of 39, she emigrated to Canada with her husband and their three daughters. The family settled in Oakville, Ontario, in the Greater Toronto Area, where they lived for more than two decades and continued to run the flooring company, which later operated from Mississauga. Ianovskaia worked in the business for over 20 years before stepping back around 2020 to concentrate on mountaineering.

== Mountaineering ==
=== Early climbs ===
Ianovskaia began regular training in her late forties, moving from yoga and Pilates to weight training and indoor rock climbing. She took up mountaineering at 50, after the birth of her third grandchild, setting herself the goals of running a marathon and climbing Mount Kilimanjaro. She ran three marathons and climbed Kilimanjaro with her youngest daughter, Darya (Dasha), who became her regular climbing partner. (Note: Sources differ on the year of the Kilimanjaro climb: CBC News gives 2009, while Gripped gives 2011.)

She went on to climb rock and ice in Ontario and to make ascents in the Americas and the Alps, including Aconcagua (by 2013), the Matterhorn, Mount Rainier, Pico de Orizaba, Cotopaxi, Antisana, Alpamayo and Illimani. In 2018 she and Dasha climbed Ama Dablam in Nepal.

=== Cho Oyu and Manaslu (2019–2021) ===
Ianovskaia climbed her first eight-thousander, Cho Oyu (8,188 m (26,864 ft)), in the autumn of 2019. A planned 2020 attempt on Everest was cancelled when borders closed at the start of the COVID-19 pandemic. In the spring of 2021 she returned to Everest, but her attempt ended after she tested positive for COVID-19 at base camp and was evacuated. That autumn she was listed among the climbers reported by 8K Expeditions as having summited Manaslu. (Note: The Himalayan Database records Ianovskaia's 2021 Manaslu expedition without a main-summit ascent. In 2021 the position of Manaslu's true summit, as distinct from a lower fore-summit reached by many climbers in earlier years, was the subject of renewed scrutiny.)

=== Everest, K2 and Gasherbrum II (2022) ===
On May 14, 2022, Ianovskaia and her daughter Dasha reached the summit of Mount Everest together with 8K Expeditions. On the summit they displayed a flag combining the flags of Belarus, Ukraine and Canada. During the descent, at about 8,200 m (26,900 ft), her oxygen supply ran out; she recovered after her daughter's Sherpa guide gave her his oxygen. The ascent was reported in Canadian media as a rare mother–daughter summit of Everest, and The Highlander described Ianovskaia as the oldest Canadian woman to have climbed the mountain.

Two months later she joined an 8K Expeditions team on K2. After a first summit push in early July was turned back by weather, she left Camp 4 at around 10 p.m. on July 21, crossed the Bottleneck at night using supplemental oxygen, and reached the summit at about 3:30 a.m. on July 22, 2022, accompanied by Pema Chhiring Sherpa. At 62 years and 350 days, she became the oldest woman to climb K2, surpassing Vanessa O'Brien, who had summited at 52 in 2017. She was also the first Canadian woman to summit K2, and has been described as the first Belarusian-born woman to do so. Ianovskaia later wrote that a world record "had never crossed my mind" and that she learned of it from the expedition leader after the climb. On August 8, 2022, she summited Gasherbrum II (8,035 m (26,362 ft)), her fifth eight-thousander.

=== Lhotse and Dhaulagiri (2023) ===
In the spring of 2023, Ianovskaia joined an expedition to Kangchenjunga that was abandoned at about 8,100 m (26,600 ft) because of problems with route fixing. On May 24, 2023, she summited Lhotse (8,516 m (27,940 ft)), where she unfurled a banner reading "Save Minden ER" in support of a local campaign against the closure of the emergency department in Minden, Ontario, near her part-time home in Haliburton County. On September 29, 2023, she reached the summit of Dhaulagiri (8,167 m (26,795 ft)) with Mingma Dorchi Sherpa and Pema Nurbu Sherpa; according to 8K Expeditions, at 64 she became the oldest woman to climb the mountain.

=== Makalu and Annapurna I (2024–2025) ===
In May 2024, Ianovskaia climbed Makalu (8,485 m (27,838 ft)), her eighth eight-thousander; a second attempt on Kangchenjunga that season was abandoned because of deep snow. On April 7, 2025, at the age of 65, she summited Annapurna I (8,091 m (26,545 ft)), often described as the most dangerous of the eight-thousanders; she has been reported as the oldest woman to have climbed it. Belarusian opposition leader Sviatlana Tsikhanouskaya publicly congratulated her on the ascent.

=== Kangchenjunga and Nanga Parbat (2026) ===
On her third attempt on the mountain, Ianovskaia reached the summit of Kangchenjunga (8,586 m (28,169 ft)), the world's third-highest peak, at 4:10 a.m. local time on May 23, 2026, with an expedition organized by Altipro Adventures; she spent about 30 minutes on the summit, where she raised the Belarusian white-red-white and Canadian flags. At 66, she has been reported as the oldest woman to have climbed the mountain.

About five weeks later, on July 1, 2026, she summited Nanga Parbat (8,126 m (26,660 ft)) in Pakistan at 6:50 a.m. local time, climbing the Kinshofer route on the Diamir face with 8K Expeditions and Dawa Ongju Sherpa. The route above Camp 3 was largely without fixed ropes, and her summit push took about 11 hours. At 66 she became the oldest woman to summit Nanga Parbat; it was her 11th eight-thousander.

As of October 2026, Ianovskaia's remaining eight-thousanders were Shishapangma, Broad Peak and Gasherbrum I. She said she planned to attempt Shishapangma subject to Chinese permits and the two Karakoram peaks the following summer.

=== Eight-thousander ascents ===
Eight-thousanders climbed by Ianovskaia
No.	Mountain	Height	Date	Age	Notes
1	Cho Oyu	8,188 m (26,864 ft)	Autumn 2019	60	
2	Manaslu	8,163 m (26,781 ft)	Autumn 2021	62	Listed by 8K Expeditions; not recorded as a main-summit ascent by the Himalayan Database
3	Mount Everest	8,849 m (29,032 ft)	May 14, 2022	62	With daughter Dasha
4	K2	8,611 m (28,251 ft)	July 22, 2022	62	Oldest woman (Guinness World Records); first Canadian woman
5	Gasherbrum II	8,035 m (26,362 ft)	August 8, 2022	63	
6	Lhotse	8,516 m (27,940 ft)	May 24, 2023	63	
7	Dhaulagiri	8,167 m (26,795 ft)	September 29, 2023	64	Reported as oldest woman
8	Makalu	8,485 m (27,838 ft)	May 2024	64	
9	Annapurna I	8,091 m (26,545 ft)	April 7, 2025	65	Reported as oldest woman
10	Kangchenjunga	8,586 m (28,169 ft)	May 23, 2026	66	Reported as oldest woman
11	Nanga Parbat	8,126 m (26,660 ft)	July 1, 2026	66	Oldest woman

== Records ==
- Oldest person to climb K2 (female) – 62 years 350 days, July 22, 2022 (Guinness World Records, verified by Eberhard Jurgalski).
- Oldest person to climb Everest and K2 (female) – 62 years 350 days, 2022 (Guinness World Records).
- First Canadian woman to summit K2 (2022).
- Reported as the oldest woman to summit Dhaulagiri (2023), Annapurna I (2025), Kangchenjunga (2026) and Nanga Parbat (2026).

== Personal life ==
Ianovskaia is married to Vladimir, with whom she has three daughters; she is a grandmother. Her youngest daughter, Dasha, has accompanied her on many expeditions, including Kilimanjaro, Ama Dablam and Everest. After more than two decades in Oakville, Ianovskaia moved to Canmore, Alberta, in 2022. She trains on peaks in the Canadian Rockies around Canmore and ice climbs in winter.

== See also ==
- List of Mount Everest records
- List of Belarusian sportspeople
