= Azerbaijan University =

Private university in Baku, Azerbaijan

- Azərbaycan Universiteti
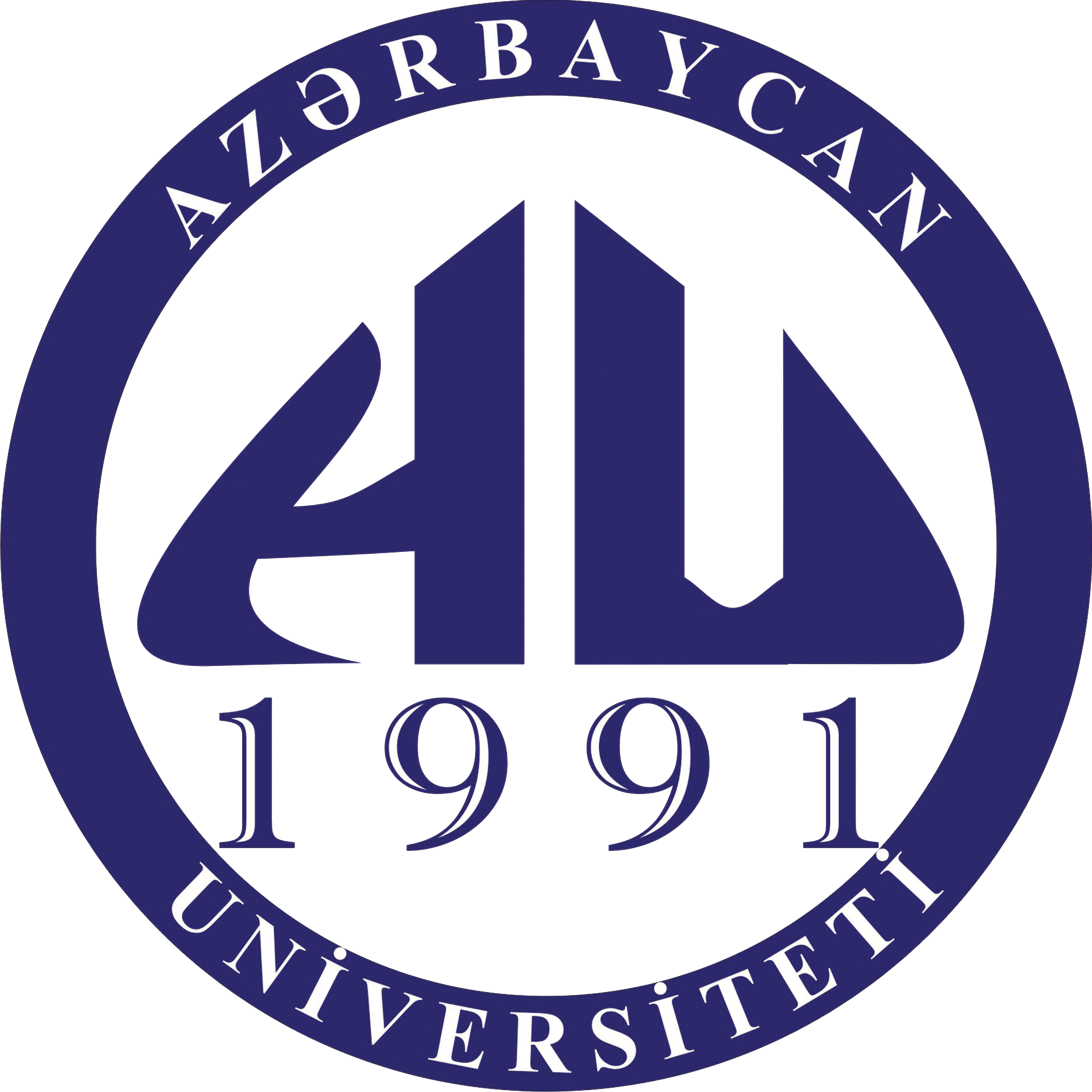
- Former names: Higher Humanitarian College (1991–1993)
- Motto: Gələcəyini Bu Gün Seç (Azerbaijani)
- Motto in English: Choose Your Future Today
- Type: Private research university
- Established: 1991; 35 years ago
- Founders: Salahaddin Khalilov
- Academic affiliations: AESOP
- Rector: Saadat Aliyeva
- Academic staff: 258
- Students: 3,230
- Location: Baku, Azerbaijan; 40°23′43″N 49°50′37″E
- Campus: Urban
- Website: www.au.edu.az

Azerbaijan University (AU; Azerbaijani: Azərbaycan Universiteti) is a private research university located in Baku, Azerbaijan. It is Azerbaijan's first private university, founded by Salahaddin Khalilov in 1991. The university features three faculties, seven departments, and six centers, providing bachelor's, master's, and doctorate degree education. It currently enrolls 3,230 students.

== Background information ==
Founded in 1991 by Prof. Salahaddin Khalilov, AU became the first private university in Azerbaijan. It was officially registered by the decision of the Higher State Expert Committee on March 3, 1993, and of the Board of Ministry of Education on April 8, 1993, and was registered in the State Register No. 1. It was officially registered as a non-public Azerbaijan University, including a specialized college and an English-language gymnasium. On February 24, 2009, AU was re-accredited as a higher educational institution with the order number 213 of the Accreditation Commission of the Ministry of Education. The university received the right to award its students diplomas for degrees and majors determined in this order and to use all privileges of public higher educational institutions, including the privilege of deferment of military service.

== History ==
Azerbaijan University is a private higher education institution located in Azerbaijan. It was established in 1991 as the Higher Humanitarian College, which was founded on July 16, 1991, following an order issued by the Minister of Public Education and the General Assembly of the Higher Humanitarian College. The institution initially operated as a college before transitioning into a private university under the name Azerbaijan University in January 1993.

The university went through a series of official recognitions and registrations. On March 3, 1993, it was included in the State Register No. 01 after being approved by the State Higher Expert Commission (SHEC). A further decision by the Collegium of the Ministry of Education, dated April 8, 1993. Following the establishment of a new State Supreme Expert Commission in September 1994, the university received a license from the Ministry of Education, confirming its continued operation as a private higher education institution. On March 4, 1995, the Cabinet of Ministers of the Republic of Azerbaijan officially recognized the university.

Over the years, Azerbaijan University has undergone multiple accreditations and evaluations by the relevant government bodies. On February 24, 2009, the university was officially re-accredited by the Accreditation Commission of the Ministry of Education of the Republic of Azerbaijan. Following this, a special approval for the university's continued operation was granted on July 10, 2009, under Order No. 929 from the Minister of Education, allowing the university to function for another five years. Later, in 2016, the Ministry of Economy of the Republic of Azerbaijan approved the university's continued operation without a time limit. Another re-accreditation took place on July 20, 2018, when the university was granted approval to function for an additional five-year period.

The academic structure of Azerbaijan University has expanded over time. In 1997, the university introduced a master's degree program. By 2003, it had started offering doctoral and dissertation training at the Ph.D. level. Since 2006, the university has operated in accordance with the Bologna Process, which standardizes higher education systems across Europe. As part of this, it has implemented the European Credit Transfer System (ECTS), which ensures compatibility with international education standards. Additionally, in 2009, the Ministry of Education designated Azerbaijan University as a pilot institution for the implementation of a credit-multiple-point system.

At present, Azerbaijan University consists of three faculties, seven academic departments, and six research centers. It offers a range of undergraduate, graduate, and doctoral programs, with instruction available in both Azerbaijani and English. Students enrolled in English-language programs are required to complete a one-year language preparatory course before beginning their main studies. The university also participates in international academic exchange programs, including Erasmus+, Mevlana, and DAAD (German Academic Exchange Service), which allow students and faculty members to engage in academic mobility with universities in Turkey, Germany, and various European countries.

Since 2019, Azerbaijan University has partnered with Kharkiv National University of Radioelectronics in Ukraine to offer an International Dual Diploma Program in computer engineering, covering both undergraduate and graduate levels. In 2021, the two institutions expanded their cooperation by establishing a joint teaching-research laboratory focused on information security. The university also operates an Intra-University Two Diploma Program (IUTDP), which enables students to earn two diplomas in different fields of study within a period of four years.

In addition to its degree programs, Azerbaijan University functions as an official accredited test center for the European Computer Driving Licence (ECDL), an internationally recognized certification for computer proficiency. It also serves as a Pearson Test of English (PTE) sub-center, where English language proficiency exams are administered.

Throughout its history, Azerbaijan University has been led by several rectors. From 1991 to 2006, the university was headed by Salahaddin Khalilov, a Doctor of Philosophy and Corresponding Member of ANAS. He was followed by Farahim Sadigov, a professor of Pedagogical Sciences, who served in 2006–2007. Other past rectors include Akif Musayev (2007–2011), Aslan Kahramanli (2011–2012), Eldar Kahramanov (2012–2015), and Farid Ahmadov (2015–2017). The current rector, Saadat Aliyeva, was appointed on March 13, 2017.

== Campus ==
Azerbaijan University owns one campus in the city of Baku. It is located in the Nizami raion of the capital city, a walkable distance away from ADA University.

== Academic information ==
The teaching process at the university is carried out in three languages (Azerbaijan, Russian and English). The students of the BBA program learn the second foreign language beside English (German, French, Arabic, Turkish and others), according to their preferences.
