= Ilya Ushakov =

Belarusian footballer

Personal information
- Date of birth: 10 May 1991 (age 35)
- Place of birth: Minsk, Belarusian SSR
- Position: Midfielder

Youth career
- 2007–2009: Minsk

Senior career*
Years	Team	Apps	(Gls)
2008–2014	Minsk	1	(0)
2008	→ Minsk-2	25	(3)
2011	→ Kommunalnik Slonim (loan)	14	(2)
2012–2014	→ Minsk-2	41	(8)
2014	Slonim	12	(1)
2015	Smorgon	2	(0)
- * Club domestic league appearances and goals as of 1 December 2015

Ilya Ushakov (Belarusian: Iлля Ушакоў; Russian: Илья Ушаков; born 10 May 1991) is a Belarusian former footballer. His latest club was Smorgon in 2015.
