= Ulduz Rafili-Aliyeva =

Azerbaijani and Soviet theater director

- Born: Ulduz Saleh gizi Rafili; 15 December 1922; Ganja, Azerbaijan
- Died: 2006 (aged 83–84); Baku, Azerbaijan
- Occupation: theatre director
- Known for: The first Azerbaijani woman-theatre director

Ulduz Saleh gizi Rafili-Aliyeva (Azerbaijani: Ulduz Saleh qızı Rəfili; 15 December 1922, Ganja, Goranboy region – 2006, Baku) was an Azerbaijani and Soviet theater director, professor, Honored Art Worker of the Azerbaijan SSR (1964). She was the first Azerbaijani woman to become a professional theater director.

== Early life and education ==
Ulduz Saleh qızı Rafili was born on December 15, 1922, in the village of Borsunlu, Goranboy district. At the age of 12, she and her generation fell victim to Soviet repression, and in 1934, she migrated to Baku with her elder sister Səmayə. In her autobiography, written in her own hand, Ulduz recalls:

"My father Saleh Aliev passed away before I was born. My mother remarried for the second time. After her passing in 1935, I had to embark on an independent life. Until the Great Patriotic War, I lived with my elder sister Səmayə Rafili, who had been residing in Moscow. In 1938, I graduated from the Industrial Technical School."

Subsequently, Ulduz enrolled at Institute of Railway Engineers in Moscow, where she not only pursued her studies but also worked as a station shift supervisor in the Moscow Metro and as an electric train engineer. After the war ended, Ulduz returned to Baku, where she enrolled in the Directing Faculty of the current University of Culture and Arts and graduated in 1951. During that time, alongside her studies, she worked as a consultant at the "Azerbaijanfilm" film studio named after J. Jabbarli and as a lecturer at the former Library Science Technical School.

== Career ==
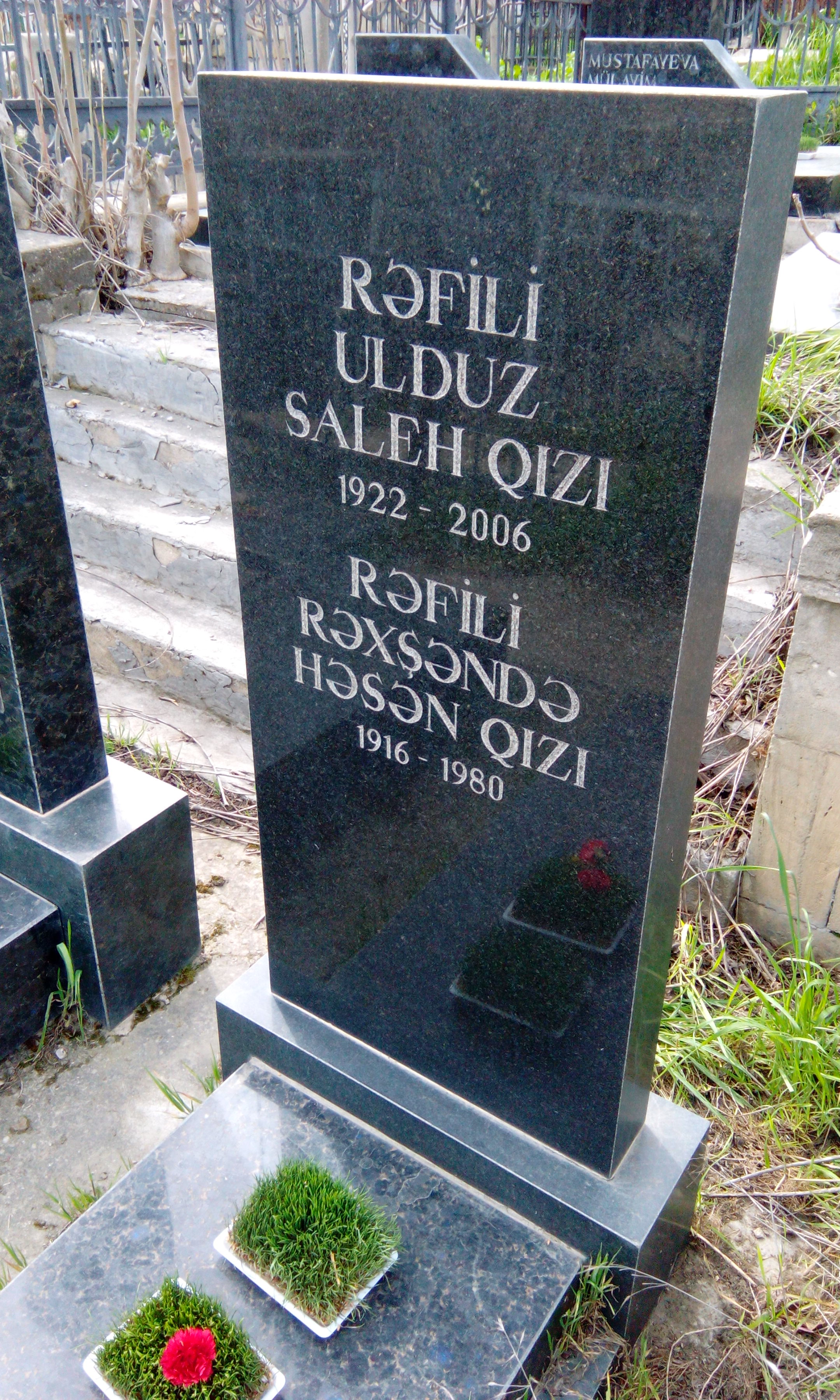
Ulduz Rafili's tombstone

In 1952, Rafili started working as a director in the Young Spectator's Theatre in Baku. In 1972, a biography was presented to the Ministry of Culture of the Azerbaijan SSR about the artist by the management of the Young Spectators Theater, stating:

"Ulduz Rafili-Alieva has been working at the Young Spectators Theater since 1952 as Azerbaijan's first professional female director. During her 20 years of activity, she has directed more than 50 productions. Her productions are noted for their modernity, artistic ideas, and creative approach. These works have been well received by audiences and repeatedly praised in the press. She has successfully directed performances in both Azerbaijani and Russian sections of the theater. Her effective work as a member of the Theater's Artistic Council is also noteworthy. She has been actively involved in the training of young actors and in selecting new plays and playwrights for the repertoire. In addition to her theatrical contributions, Mrs. Ulduz has been active in the public life of the theater, regularly organizing meetings with students with great enthusiasm."

During the next 20 years, she directed over 50 performances on the stage of the theater. Rafili became the first female theater director in Azerbaijan. Many performances staged by Rafili have won All-Union festivals and been awarded diplomas and prizes.

In 1963-1967, Rafili was elected a deputy, engaged in active socio-political activities.

In 1972-1975, Rafili worked as the chief director of the Young Spectator's Theater. In September 1975, Rafili started her pedagogical career at the Department of Opera Training of the Baku Music Academy. During her work at the Music Academy, she directed S. Rakhmaninoff's "Aleko", P. Tchaikovsky's "Iolanta", F. Amirov's "Sevil", Mozart's "The Marriage of Figaro" and others.

Ulduz Rafili died in 2006 in Baku.

== Personal life ==
Rafili was married to Gurban Aliyev who worked in the Ministry of Education of the Azerbaijan SSR. They had one son, Hasan Aliyev.

== Awards and honors ==
In 1964, Rafili was awarded a title of Honored Art Worker of the Azerbaijan SSR.

In 2012, a memorial evening dedicated to the 90th anniversary of Rafili was held at the Young Spectator's Theatre in Baku.

== Works ==
- Second Family (1954)
- Separated roads (1957)
- Crane train (1958)
- Gavroche (1959) by Victor Hugo
- Song of hope (1959)
- Courage (1963)
- Shirinbala collects honey (1965) by Salam Gadirzade
- Rooster (1965)
- Rabbit's birthday (1966) by Khanymana Alibeyli
- The servant of two masters (1968) by Carlo Goldoni
- Last night of last year (1968) by Anar Rzayev
- Gypsy girl (1971) by S.Sani Akhundov
- Ayjan (1973) by Khanymana Alibeyli
