= Alyaksandr Halowchyk =

Belarusian footballer

Personal information
- Date of birth: 17 October 1979 (age 47)
- Height: 1.79 m (5 ft 10 1/2 in)
- Position: Defender

Youth career
- 1997–1999: Dinamo Brest

Senior career*
| Years | Team | Apps | (Gls) |
| 1997 | Dinamo-2 Brest | 9 | (5) |
| 1998 | Kobrin | 15 | (14) |
| 1998 | Belenergostroy Beloozyorsk | 15 | (5) |
| 1999 | Pruzhany | 10 | (12) |
| 1999 | Vodokanal Brest | 4 | (0) |
| 1999–2005 | Dinamo Brest | 112 | (2) |
| 2006–2009 | Granit Mikashevichi | 53 | (1) |
- * Club domestic league appearances and goals

Alyaksandr Halowchyk (Belarusian: Аляксандр Галоўчык; Russian: Александр Головчик; born 17 October 1979) is a retired Belarusian professional footballer.
