= Overscreening =

Overscreening, also called unnecessary screening, is the performance of medical screening without a medical indication to do so. Screening is a medical test in a healthy person who is showing no symptoms of a disease and is intended to detect a disease so that a person may prepare to respond to it. Screening is indicated in people who have some threshold risk for getting a disease, but is not indicated in people who are unlikely to develop a disease. Overscreening is a type of unnecessary health care.

Overscreening is problematic because it can lead to risky or harmful additional treatment when a healthy person gets a false positive result for screening which they should not have had. It also causes unnecessary stress for the person receiving the test, and it brings unnecessary financial costs that someone pays.

The general rule is that people should only be screened for a medical condition when there is a reason to believe that they ought to be screened, such a medical guideline recommendation for screening based on evidence from a person's medical history or physical examination.

Controversy and debate arise when new medical guidelines change screening recommendations.

== Definition ==
Screening is a type of medical test which is done on health people who do not show symptoms of a medical condition. Screenings are correctly performed when done on a person who has significant risk of developing a medical condition, and incorrectly performed when done on a person whose risk is not significant.

There can be debate about when risk becomes great enough to become significant and merit a recommendation for screening, but in discussions about overscreening, this is not the cause of the problem. Overscreening almost always happens when a person is screened routinely and without any consideration of their risk for a medical condition.

One early use of the term "overscreening" as "unnecessary screening" was in 1992 in the context of cervical cancer screening.

A 1979 paper used the term "overscreening" to mean "false positive result in a screening".

== Causes of overscreening ==
=== Same causes as unnecessary health care ===
Overscreening is a type of unnecessary health care, so the causes of unnecessary health care are also causes of overscreening. Some causes include financial biases for physicians to recommend more treatment in health care systems using fee-for-service and physician self-referral practices; and physicians' practice of defensive medicine.

=== Screening creep ===
Over time, recommendations to screen are made for populations with less risk in the past.

Clinical practice guidelines advise physicians to screen early to detect diseases. It has been considered that guideline committees might not appropriately do cost-effectiveness analysis, consider opportunity cost, or evaluate risks to patients when they broaden screening recommendations.

=== Diagnostic creep ===
Over time, the indicators for making a diagnosis are lower so that people with fewer symptoms are diagnosed with a disease sooner. Additionally, new diseases are named and treatment is recommended, including "subclinical diseases", "preclinical diseases", or "pseudodiseases", which are described as early versions of a disease which has not manifested.

=== Patient demand ===
Patient demand is a sort of self-diagnosis in which patients request treatment regardless of whether the treatment they request is medically indicated. Causes for patients requesting treatment include increased access to health information on the Internet and direct-to-consumer advertising.

Ethical concerns of screening under these circumstances have been described.

=== Distraction tricks by physicians ===
Physicians sometimes use screening as a placebo for patients who wish to have some kind of care. The physician may recommend screening to placate the patient's demand for fast recovery in times when the recommended action would be to do nothing except wait. Research suggests that patients are more satisfied with their treatment when it is or seems expensive because patients believe that the more care they get, even if it is not necessary, then at least doing something is better than doing nothing.

== Arguments against overscreening ==
Overscreening is a type of unnecessary health care. One study about unnecessary screening before surgery reported that physicians order unnecessary tests because of tradition in the practice of medicine, anticipation that other physicians will expect the test results when they see the patient, defensive medicine, worries that a surgery may be canceled if the test is not done, and lack of understanding about when a test is actually indicated.

=== False positive medical test results ===
A false positive medical test result is a false-positive test result of medical screening. It happens when a test indicates that a person has a medical condition when actually the person does not.

Overscreening can be a problem because it can generate a false positive medical test result in a healthy person who does not have the medical condition which screening is supposed to detect. In such cases, the person who received the false positive test is more likely to get further unnecessary screening or even receive treatment for a condition which that person does not have. In either of these cases, the person becomes exposed to the risks and harms of treatment which they ought not be getting.

In general, people should not have medical screening unless the screening is indicated by the person's medical history, a physical examination, and a medical guideline. The rationale for this is that in cases in which a person is unlikely to have a medical condition, it can be more likely that a test will give a false positive result than it would be for the test to detect something which is unlikely considering the person's medical history. If a false positive result does occur in a patient unlikely to have that disease, then that patient will be likely to seek treatment.

=== Unnecessary costs ===
Overscreening tends to happen more in circumstances in which medical billing happens based on fee-for-service models rather than bundled payment. One reason for this is because health care providers have incentive to provide more services to increase their revenue. Furthermore, when patients are shielded from cost sharing, that also tends to increase rates of overscreening as when patients pay nothing for additional treatment, they tend to request more services even when they are not indicated.

=== Iatrogenesis ===
Overscreening risks psychogenic iatrogenesis by reinforcing patients' beliefs that minor or benign symptoms represent serious physical illness. This process fosters unnecessary anxiety and fixation on health, potentially triggering chronic conditions driven primarily by psychological factors, as seen in disorders like chronic fatigue syndrome (CFS). Consequently, overscreening may inadvertently medicalize normal experiences, fueling health anxiety and dependence on medical validation.

== Overscreening examples ==
=== Cancer screening ===
==== Prostate cancer screening ====
The United States Preventive Services Task Force (USPSTF) recommended against PSA screening in healthy men finding that the potential risks outweigh the potential benefits. Guidelines from the American Urological Association, and the American Cancer Society recommend that men be informed of the risks and benefits of screening. The American Society of Clinical Oncology recommends screening be discouraged in those who are expected to live less than ten years, while in those with a life expectancy of greater than ten years a decision should be made by the person in question based on the potential risks and benefits. In general, they conclude that based on recent research, "it is uncertain whether the benefits associated with PSA testing for prostate cancer screening are worth the harms associated with screening and subsequent unnecessary treatment."

==== Breast cancer screening ====
Recommendations to attend to mammography screening vary across countries and organizations, with the most common difference being the age at which screening should begin, and how frequently or if it should be performed, among women at typical risk for developing breast cancer. Some other organizations recommend mammograms begin as early as age 40 in normal-risk women, and take place more frequently, up to once each year. Women at higher risk may benefit from earlier or more frequent screening. Women with one or more first-degree relatives (mother, sister, daughter) with premenopausal breast cancer often begin screening at an earlier age, perhaps at an age 10 years younger than the age when the relative was diagnosed with breast cancer.

===== Potential benefits of breast cancer screening =====
Implementing population-based mammography screening programs has contributed to a decrease in breast cancer mortality risk over the past couple of decades. Beneficial effects of mammography screening are usually measured by the decrease in breast cancer deaths averted and the "quality-adjusted life years" gained. For women within the 50-69 year age range, annual screening can further reduce the risk of breast cancer mortality and can lead to diagnosing tumors at smaller sizes.

==== Potential harms of breast cancer screening ====
One potential harm associated with breast cancer screening is false-positive results. False positives tend to cause anxiety and prompt the need for follow-up diagnostic procedures, including recommendations for a biopsy. Observational data reveals that the probability of experiencing false positive results or receiving a false positive biopsy recommendation is much higher when screening is done annually rather than biennially or triennially. Another potential harm is overdiagnosis. Studies generally show that when screening is done more frequently, the estimates of overdiagnosis increase. Additionally, mammograms expose people to radiation, which is associated with a small risk of inducing breast cancer.

=== Heart related tests ===
==== Electrocardiography ====
Electrocardiograms are sometimes inappropriately used to screen low-risk patients with no symptoms for cardiac disease, perhaps as part of a routine annual exam. There is not much evidence that this test in low-risk individuals can improve health outcomes. False positive results, however, are likely to lead to follow-up invasive procedures, unnecessary further treatment, and a misdiagnosis. The harms of a non-indicated annual screening have been determined to outweigh the potential benefit, and for that reason, screening without an indication is discouraged.

Young athletes are sometimes screened with ECG as a requirement for them to play sports, and the necessity of this and harms from false positive results are debated.

==== Heart imaging stress tests ====
Cardiac stress tests, including stress echocardiography and nuclear stress tests, are used to detect a block in blood flow to the heart. They do this by taking pictures of the heart while the heart is exercising. Persons who have symptoms of heart disease or who are high risk for a heart attack may need this test, while people without these symptoms and who are low risk generally do not.

==== Coronary computed tomography ====
Coronary artery calcium scoring is a diagnostic test in the field of cardiovascular x-ray computed tomography. It is used to screen for coronary artery disease. Asymptomatic people who have low risk, including a lack of family history of premature coronary artery disease, should not be screened with this test. Coronary computed tomography angiography should not be used to screen people who are asymptomatic. Additionally, this test rarely provides insight which cannot be gained from coronary artery calcium scoring.

== Opinions about overscreening ==
Overscreening has been called "unethical".

== Psychological impacts of overscreening for cancer ==
The psychological consequences of overscreening are primarily addressed in studies that examine the effects of false-positive results. General disease screening and disease risk estimations do not appear to have adverse long-lasting effects on depression, general anxiety, or overall quality of life. The experience of receiving a false-positive test result comes with distinct costs to psychological and behavioral health.

=== Psychological distress and quality of life ===
The most significant psychological impact of a false-positive test result, particularly in mammography screening, is disease-specific psychological distress.

==== Disease-specific vs. generic impact ====
Some research indicates a lasting negative psychological impact when distress is quantified using measures tailored to specific disease-related worries, measures like the Psychological Consequences Questionnaire (PCQ). A meta-analysis found that receiving a false-positive result from a mammogram was associated with differences in all of the eight breast cancer-specific outcomes that were measured, including heightened anxiety and distress about breast cancer. In contrast, studies that utilized generic measures, like the Hospital Anxiety and Depression Scale (HADS) or the General Health Questionnaire (GHQ-28), usually reveal no significant differences in depression or general anxiety between women who receive false-positive results and those who receive accurate results in the medium or long term. Only one generic outcome was associated with false positives (generalized anxiety), and the effect size found was described as small.

==== Duration, intensity of distress, and context ====
Breast cancer-specific psychological stress can last for up to three years after receiving a false-positive test result. Distress severity and duration are dependent on the degree of invasiveness of the screening procedure. Women who have invasive procedures, like biopsies, deal with higher levels of distress in comparison to those who solely received fine-needle aspiration or further mammography. For women who received biopsies, the risk of distress was the highest at the five-month mark post-assessment, and these women maintained the highest risk of distress in comparison with women with regular mammograms 35 months post-screening. Women reported feeling distressed once they received the letter letting them know of their need for reassessment. Some factors that strongly correlate with lasting distress include:

- being unable to talk to someone after their screening appointment,
- long waiting times between the initial screening, and
- unnecessary worry caused by being screened.

=== Impacts on behavior post-mammogram and adherence to screening ===
Women who have dealt with a false-positive mammogram result are more likely to report an increase in breast self-examination frequency. This behavior is sometimes interpreted as an expression of heightened anxiety and increased concern regarding the risk of having breast cancer.

The distress from receiving a false-positive screening result may be sufficient to deter an additional 3% of women from going to their next screening appointment. An observational study examining this outcome found that women with false-positive results were statistically significantly less likely to return for their next round of screening in comparison with those with accurate test results.
