= Ihar Zanyamonets =

Belarusian footballer

Personal information
- Date of birth: 24 September 1989 (age 37)
- Height: 1.85 m (6 ft 1 in)
- Position: Forward

Youth career
- 2005–2007: Torpedo Zhodino

Senior career*
| Years | Team | Apps | (Gls) |
| 2007–2009 | Torpedo Zhodino | 30 | (2) |

International career
| 2009 | Belarus U-21 | 1 | (0) |
- * Club domestic league appearances and goals

Ihar Zanyamonets (Belarusian: Ігар Занямонец; Russian: Игорь Занемонец; born 24 September 1989) is a retired Belarusian professional footballer. His only professional club was Torpedo Zhodino in 2009.
