= Aleksandr Puzevich =

Belarusian footballer

Personal information
- Date of birth: 2 August 1995 (age 31)
- Place of birth: Soligorsk, Minsk Oblast, Belarus
- Height: 1.84 m (6 ft 1/2 in)
- Position: Midfielder

Youth career
- 2014–2016: Torpedo-BelAZ Zhodino

Senior career*
Years	Team	Apps	(Gls)
2016	Torpedo-BelAZ Zhodino	0	(0)
2016	→ Belshina Bobruisk (loan)	5	(0)
2017	Smorgon	16	(0)
2018	Smolevichi	0	(0)
2018	Granit Mikashevichi	10	(1)
2019	Baranovichi	13	(0)
2019	Viktoriya Maryina Gorka	10	(1)
2020	Shakhtyor Petrikov	6	(1)
2021–2024	Partizan Soligorsk	40	(3)
2025	Soligorsk	8	(0)
- * Club domestic league appearances and goals as of 8 April 2026

Aleksandr Puzevich (Belarusian: Аляксандр Пузевіч; Russian: Александр Пузевич; born 18 March 1994) is a Belarusian professional footballer.
