= Vladislav Nikityanov =

Russian association footballer

Personal information
- Full name: Vladislav Sergeyevich Nikityanov
- Date of birth: 19 October 1993 (age 33)
- Place of birth: Gomel, Belarus
- Height: 1.85 m (6 ft 1 in)
- Position: Midfielder

Team information
- Current team: FC Peresvet Domodedovo

Youth career
- –2012: FC Saturn Ramenskoye
- 2012: FC Meteor Zhukovsky

Senior career*
Years	Team	Apps	(Gls)
2012–2014	FC Saturn Ramenskoye (amateur)		
2015–2016	FC Kolomna	37	(5)
2016–2019	FC Saturn Ramenskoye	44	(4)
2018	→ FC Khimki (loan)	1	(0)
2019–	FC Peresvet Domodedovo		
- * Club domestic league appearances and goals as of 2 June 2019

Vladislav Sergeyevich Nikityanov (Russian: Владислав Сергеевич Никитянов; born 10 October 1993) is a Russian football player. He plays for FC Peresvet Domodedovo.

== Club career ==
He made his debut in the Russian Professional Football League for FC Kolomna on 10 April 2015 in a game against FC Strogino Moscow.

He made his Russian Football National League debut for FC Khimki on 12 May 2018 in a game against FC Rotor Volgograd.
