= Vagif Aliyev =

Azerbaijani politician (born 1953)

Vagif Aliyev Vaqif Əliyev

First Deputy Minister of Culture and Tourism
- Incumbent
- Assumed office February 18, 2011
- President: Heydar Aliyev, Ilham Aliyev

Mayor of Sumqayit City
- In office April 3, 2003 – February 18, 2011

First Deputy Minister of Youth, Tourism and Sport
- In office 1994 – April 3, 2003

Personal details
- Born: June 17, 1953 (age 73) Nakhchivan ASSR, Azerbaijan SSR, Soviet Union
- Party: Yeni Azərbaycan Partiyası (YAP)
- Education: Azerbaijan State University
- Occupation: Deputy Minister
- Profession: Politician
- Website: The Ministry of Culture and Tourism

Vagif Aliyev Gadir oghlu (Azerbaijani: Əliyev Vaqif Qadir oğlu) (born June 17, 1953) is an Azerbaijani politician and the First Deputy minister of the Ministry of Culture of Azerbaijan Republic.

== Early life ==
He was born on June 17, 1953. In 1975, he graduated from the faculty of Physics in Azerbaijan State University. During 1975-82, he worked as an engineer, junior researcher, group leader and senior teacher in Space Research Institute of Natural Resources of the Azerbaijan National Academy of Sciences. in 1982-1988, he was the Secretary of the Komsomol of the Azerbaijan State University. In 1988-1994, he worked as a senior lecturer at the faculty of Physics in Baku State University.

== Political career ==
In 1994-2003, he held the position of First Deputy Minister of Sport, Youth and Tourism. From April 2003 till 2011 February, he held the position of the head of the Executive power of Sumqayit. Since 18 February 2011 he is First Deputy Minister of The Ministry of Culture and Tourism of Azerbaijan Republic. He has PhD in Physics and Mathematics (1980).

He is a member of New Azerbaijan Party Management and political board.

== Personal life ==
He is married and has 3 children.

== See also ==
- Sumgayit
- Politics of Azerbaijan
