= Alyaksandr Sobal =

Belarusian footballer

Personal information
- Date of birth: 8 December 1982 (age 43)
- Position: Defender

Team information
- Current team: Osipovichi
- Number: 21

Youth career
- Smena Minsk

Senior career*
| Years | Team | Apps | (Gls) |
| 2000–2001 | Darida Minsk Raion | 13 | (0) |
| 2002–2004 | Torpedo-SKA Minsk | 51 | (2) |
| 2005–2006 | Shakhtyor Soligorsk | 30 | (2) |
| 2007 | Sūduva Marijampolė | 14 | (1) |
| 2008–2009 | Minsk | 29 | (5) |
| 2012 | Osipovichi | 22 | (8) |
| 2013 | ALF-2007 Minsk | 13 | (2) |
| 2014 | Kletsk | 3 | (0) |
- * Club domestic league appearances and goals as of 11 December 2014

Alyaksandr Sobal (Belarusian: Аляксандр Собаль; Russian: Александр Соболь; born 8 December 1982) is a Belarusian former professional footballer. He retired from professional football in early 2010 at the age of 27 due to persistent injuries. In 2012, he came out of retirement and joined a third-level club Osipovichi. In 2014, he played for Kletsk.

== Honours ==
Shakhtyor Soligorsk

- Belarusian Premier League champion: 2005
