= Maksim Moiseyev =

Belarusian footballer

Personal information
- Date of birth: 8 February 1987 (age 39)
- Height: 1.89 m (6 ft 2 1/2 in)
- Position: Goalkeeper

Team information
- Current team: Gazovik Vitebsk

Youth career
- 2006–2007: Vitebsk

Senior career*
Years	Team	Apps	(Gls)
2007–2009	Vitebsk	0	(0)
2009	Belshina Bobruisk	13	(0)
2010	Slavia Mozyr	17	(0)
2011	Smorgon	7	(0)
2011	Vitebsk	2	(0)
2014–2015	Vitebsk	1	(0)
2021–	Gazovik Vitebsk	23	(0)
- * Club domestic league appearances and goals as of 15 December 2023

Maksim Moiseyev (Belarusian: Максім Маісееў; Russian: Максим Моисеев; born 8 February 1987) is a retired Belarusian professional footballer.
