= Jemal Inaishvili =

Georgian politician (born 1962)

Jemal Inaishvili (Georgian: ჯემალ ინაიშვილი; born November 11, 1962, in Kobuleti) is the Deputy Chairman of the Parliament of Georgia.
