= Andrey Latypaw =

Belarusian footballer

Personal information
- Full name: Andrey Vadzimavich Latypaw
- Date of birth: 16 May 1990 (age 36)
- Position: Forward

Youth career
- 2006–2008: Neman Grodno

Senior career*
Years	Team	Apps	(Gls)
2007–2008	Neman Grodno	0	(0)
2007–2008	→ Dinamo-Belсard Grodno (loan)	12	(1)
2009–2011	Dnepr Mogilev	3	(0)
- * Club domestic league appearances and goals as of 22 May 2010

Andrey Latypaw (Belarusian: Андрэй Латыпаў; Russian: Андрей Латыпов; born 16 May 1990) is a retired Belarusian professional footballer.
