= Saadat Aliyeva =

Azerbaijani scientist

- Səadət Namiq qızı Əliyeva
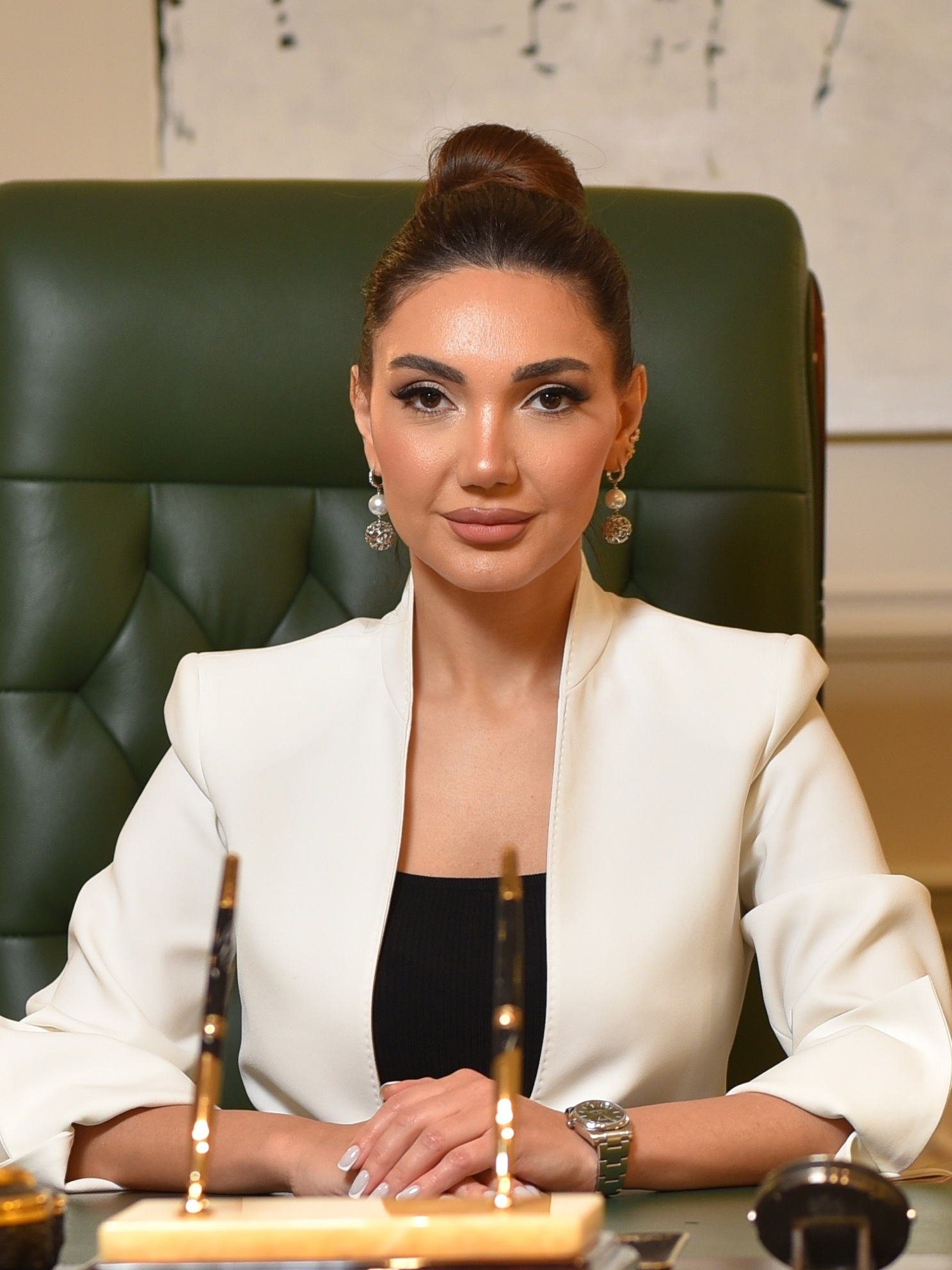

Rector of Azerbaijan University
- Incumbent
- Assumed office March 13, 2017

Personal details
- Born: September 13, 1986 (age 39) Baku, Azerbaijan SSR, USSR
- Citizenship: Azerbaijan
- Education: Azerbaijan University of Languages; Azerbaijan University

Saadat Aliyeva (Azerbaijani: Səadət Namiq qızı Əliyeva; born 13 September 1986) is an Azerbaijani scientist. She is the Rector of Azerbaijan University.

== Early life and education ==
Saadat Aliyeva was born on September 13, 1986, in Baku city. In 1993–2001, she studied at the English-language gymnasium named after Nasir al-Din al-Tusi. In 2004, she graduated from Binagadi district school No.144.

In 2008, she graduated from the bachelor's degree of Azerbaijan University of Languages with an Honors diploma, majoring in philology (English language teacher). In 2011, she graduated from the master's degree of Azerbaijan University of Languages with an Honors diploma, majoring in linguistics (English language).

In 2013–2017, she received dissertation studies at Azerbaijan University, majoring in "World Literature". In 2017, she completed her dissertation on "Directions of the development of British children's literature" in order to receive the degree of Doctor of Philosophy in Philology. In 2023, she received the scientific degree of Doctor of Philosophy in Philology.

She knows English, German, Azerbaijani, Turkish and Russian languages.

== Personal life ==
She is married and has four children.

== Career ==
Saadat Aliyeva started her career at Azerbaijan University in 2008. Between 2008 and 2009, she worked as a laboratory assistant at the Department of Languages, and between 2009 and 2013, she worked as a teacher at the Department of Languages. In 2012, she was engaged in scientific research at Ardingly College, England. In 2013–2017, she worked as a deputy head of the Department of Languages. She is the rector of Azerbaijan University since March 13, 2017.

=== Scientific career ===
Saadat Aliyeva's main field of research focuses on British children's literature. She is the editor-in-chief of "İpak Yolu" and "Chaglayan" scientific journal and a member of the editorial board of "Children's Literature in Education Journal" published by Middlesex University.

=== Books ===
- British children's literature (with Sh.Khalili), Textbook, Baku, 2018. 435 p.
- Robert Burns: Poetry, a bridge of song and a world woven with words, (together with Sh.Khalili) Textbook, Baku, 2019, 376 p.
- British children's folklore (together with Sh.Khalili), Textbook, Baku, 2021, 316 p.

== Awards ==
- The Jubilee medal of the Republic of Azerbaijan "100th anniversary of Baku State University (1919–2019)" by order of the Ministry of Education, 2019.
- The Badge of " Advanced Education Worker of the Republic of Azerbaijan" by the order of the Ministry of Education 2021.
