= Maksim Savostikov =

Belarusian professional footballer

Personal information
- Date of birth: 13 August 1998 (age 28)
- Place of birth: Minsk, Belarus
- Height: 1.78 m (5 ft 10 in)
- Position: Defender

Youth career
- 2014–2018: Dinamo Minsk

Senior career*
Years	Team	Apps	(Gls)
2017–2018	Dinamo Minsk	0	(0)
2017–2018	→ Belshina Bobruisk (loan)	19	(1)
2018	→ Oshmyany (loan)	14	(1)
2019	NFK Minsk	23	(0)
2020	Viktoriya Maryina Gorka	5	(3)
2020	Smolevichi	6	(0)

International career
2015	Belarus U17	1	(0)
2016	Belarus U19	2	(0)
- * Club domestic league appearances and goals as of 31 December 2020

Maksim Savostikov (Belarusian: Максім Савосцікаў; Russian: Максим Савостиков; born 13 August 1998) is a Belarusian former professional footballer.
