= Syarhey Shastakow =

Belarusian footballer

Personal information
- Date of birth: 19 July 1997 (age 29)
- Place of birth: Polotsk, Vitebsk Oblast, Belarus
- Position: Midfielder

Team information
- Current team: Energetik-BGATU Minsk

Youth career
- 2016–2017: Naftan Novopolotsk

Senior career*
Years	Team	Apps	(Gls)
2017	Naftan Novopolotsk	1	(0)
2018–2019	Energetik-BGATU Minsk	10	(0)
2023	Energetik-BGATU Minsk	1	(0)
- * Club domestic league appearances and goals as of 31 December 2023

Syarhey Shastakow (Belarusian: Сяргей Шастакоў; Russian: Сергей Шестаков; born 19 July 1997) is a Belarusian professional footballer.
