= Marat Voranaw =

Belarusian footballer

Personal information
- Date of birth: 3 October 1988 (age 38)
- Position: Midfielder

Youth career
- 2006–2007: Vitebsk

Senior career*
Years	Team	Apps	(Gls)
2007–2009	Vitebsk	1	(0)
2008	→ Polotsk (loan)	22	(0)
2009–2011	Polotsk	49	(1)
2012–2013	Vitebsk	36	(1)
2014	Orsha	5	(0)
2015	Senno		
2016	Slonim	20	(0)
2017	Orsha	0	(0)
- * Club domestic league appearances and goals as of 2 December 2017

Marat Voranaw (Belarusian: Марат Воранаў; Russian: Марат Воронов; born 3 October 1988) is a Belarusian former professional footballer. After his football career, Voranaw worked as a sports instructor and fitness trainer.
