= Yevgeni Kalinin =

Russian footballer and coach

Personal information
- Full name: Yevgeni Yevgenyevich Kalinin
- Date of birth: 19 March 1955 (age 71)
- Place of birth: Grodno, Byelorussian SSR, Soviet Union
- Height: 1.86 m (6 ft 1 in)
- Position: Goalkeeper

Youth career
- Khimik Grodno

Senior career*
Years	Team	Apps	(Gls)
1973–1978	Khimik Grodno	107+	(0)
1979–1980	Dynamo Leningrad	48	(0)
1981–1982	Lokomotiv Kaluga	57	(0)
1983–1990	Tekstilshchik Ivanovo	227	(0)
1990	FC Metallist Ivanovo (amateur)		
1991	Turbostroitel Kaluga (amateur)		
1992–1993	Luch Vladivostok	2	(0)

Managerial career
- 2009: Tekstilshchik Ivanovo (GK coach)
- * Club domestic league appearances and goals

Yevgeni Yevgenyevich Kalinin (Russian: Евгений Евгеньевич Калинин; born 19 March 1955) is a former Russian football player and coach.
