= Yury Stadolnik =

Belarusian footballer

Personal information
- Date of birth: 1 July 1983 (age 43)
- Place of birth: Mogilev, Belarusian SSR, Soviet Union
- Height: 1.85 m (6 ft 1 in)
- Position: Defender

Team information
- Current team: Gomel (assistant coach)

Youth career
- 1999–2001: Dnepr-Transmash Mogilev

Senior career*
Years	Team	Apps	(Gls)
1999–2006	Dnepr-Transmash Mogilev	0	(0)
1999	→ Dnepr-2 Mogilev	17	(0)
2000	→ Veino-Dnepr (loan)	23	(2)
2002	→ Torpedo-Kadino Mogilev (loan)	3	(0)
2003	→ Sozh Krichev (loan)	12	(1)
2004	→ Gorki (loan)	15	(0)
2006–2009	Gomel	2	(0)
2010–2011	DSK Gomel	9	(0)
2012	Gomelzheldortrans	1	(0)

Managerial career
- 2013–: Gomel (assistant)
- * Club domestic league appearances and goals as of 1 August 2013

Yury Stadolnik (Belarusian: Юрый Стадольнік; Russian: Юрий Стадольник; born 1 March 1983) is a Belarusian former professional footballer. As of 2014, he works as a coach in FC Gomel.
