= Salau Aliyev =

Kumyk nationalist and politician

Salau Aliyev or Salau Aliev is a Kumyk nationalist and politician. In 1990, Aliyev was one of the founders of the Tenglik, or "Kumyk Peoples' Party". Aliyev believes that the Kumyks are descended from the medieval Khazars and cites the Khazar Khaganate and the later Shamkhalate of Tarki as inspiring his vision of a Kumyk-dominated, independent Dagestan. His critics contend that such a state would be ruled by a minority of its population.
