= Vital Deykala =

Belarusian footballer

Personal information
- Date of birth: 18 April 1984 (age 42)
- Position: Striker

Youth career
- 2001–2002: Lokomotiv-96 Vitebsk

Senior career*
Years	Team	Apps	(Gls)
2002	Lokomotiv-96 Vitebsk	18	(3)
2003–2004	Torpedo Zhodino	2	(0)
2004–2007	Naftan Novopolotsk	53	(6)
2008	Neman Grodno	1	(0)
2009–2010	Vitebsk	1	(0)
- * Club domestic league appearances and goals

Vital Deykala (Belarusian: Віталь Дэйкала; Russian: Виталий Дейкало; born 18 April 1984) is a Belarusian retired professional footballer.
