= Kirill Isachenko =

Belarusian footballer

Personal information
- Date of birth: 23 April 1997 (age 29)
- Place of birth: Belarus
- Height: 1.79 m (5 ft 10 1/2 in)
- Position: Midfielder

Team information
- Current team: Tempo Rzeszotary
- Number: 5

Youth career
- 2011–2012: BATE Borisov
- 2013–2014: Dinamo Minsk

Senior career*
Years	Team	Apps	(Gls)
2015	Oshmyany	7	(0)
2016	Karviná	0	(0)
2016	Torpedo Minsk	1	(0)
2017	Krumkachy Minsk	3	(0)
2018	Orsha	3	(0)
2018	Oshmyany	7	(0)
2019	Lubuszanin Trzcianka	8	(0)
2022	Traktor Minsk	8	(0)
2024–	Tempo Rzeszotary	20	(0)
- * Club domestic league appearances and goals as of 08:35, 23 June 2025 (UTC)

Kirill Isachenko (Belarusian: Кірыл Ісачэнка; Russian: Кирилл Исаченко; born 23 April 1997) is a Belarusian professional footballer who plays as a midfielder for Polish club Tempo Rzeszotary.

== Career ==
In 2019, Kirill joined Lubuszanin Trzcianka in Poland.

== Honours ==
Lubuszanin Trzcianka

- Polish Cup (Piła regionals): 2018–19
