= Dzyanis Myadzvedzew =

Belarusian footballer

Personal information
- Date of birth: 26 January 1988 (age 38)
- Place of birth: Gomel, Belarusian SSR
- Height: 1.82 m (5 ft 11 1/2 in)
- Position: Midfielder

Youth career
- 2005–2008: Gomel

Senior career*
Years	Team	Apps	(Gls)
2008–2010	Gomel	8	(0)
2010	→ Vedrich-97 Rechitsa (loan)	15	(0)
2010	→ Gomel-2	15	(2)
2011	SKVICH Minsk	21	(0)
2012	Khimik Svetlogorsk	24	(0)
2013–2014	Rechitsa-2014	59	(0)
2015	Gomel	17	(0)
2016	Luch Minsk	13	(0)
2016	Khimik Svetlogorsk	10	(0)
2017	Neman-Agro Stolbtsy	13	(0)
- * Club domestic league appearances and goals as of 9 December 2017

Dzyanis Myadzvedzew (Belarusian: Дзяніс Мядзведзеў; Russian: Денис Медведев; born 26 January 1988) is a Belarusian former professional footballer.

== Match fixing ==
On 20 February 2018, the BFF banned him from football for 24 months for his involvement in the match-fixing.
