= Anton Bardok =

Belarusian footballer

Personal information
- Date of birth: 23 June 1986 (age 40)
- Place of birth: Soligorsk, Belarusian SSR
- Height: 1.88 m (6 ft 2 in)
- Position: Forward

Youth career
- 2001–2003: RUOR Minsk
- 2003–2004: Dinamo Minsk
- 2005–2006: MTZ-RIPO Minsk

Senior career*
Years	Team	Apps	(Gls)
2001–2003	RUOR Minsk	36	(4)
2007	Naftan Novopolotsk	4	(1)
2007	Savit Mogilev	2	(2)
2008	Spartak Shklov	11	(6)
2009	Dnepr Mogilev	12	(1)
2010	Slavia Mozyr	26	(4)
2011	Gorodeya	2	(0)
2014	SKVICH Minsk	10	(3)
2014	Kolos-Druzhba	13	(6)
- * Club domestic league appearances and goals as of 10 December 2014

Anton Bardok (Belarusian: Антон Бардок; Russian: Антон Бордок; born 23 June 1986) is a Belarusian former professional footballer.
