= Inna Botyanovskaya =

Belarusian footballer

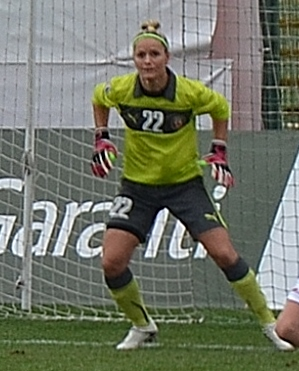
- 2015 FIFA Women's World Cup qualification – UEFA Group 6 match Turkey vs Belarus on September 17, 2014

Personal information
- Date of birth: 11 February 1984 (age 42)
- Place of birth: Belarus
- Position: Goalkeeper

Senior career*
Years	Team	Apps	(Gls)
–2010	Universitet	24+	(0+)
2011–2014	Minsk	83	(0)
2015–2016	Nadezhda	23	(1)
2018	Zorka-BDU	2	(0)

International career^{‡}
2009–2015	Belarus	24	(0)
- * Club domestic league appearances and goals as of 21 July 2018 ‡ National team caps and goals as of 26 November 2015

Inna Botyanovskaya (born 11 February 1984) is a Belarusian former footballer who played as a goalkeeper. She has been a member of the Belarus women's national team.
