= Marina Alieva =

Russian singer (born 1985)

Marina Alieva Марина Назимовна Алиева
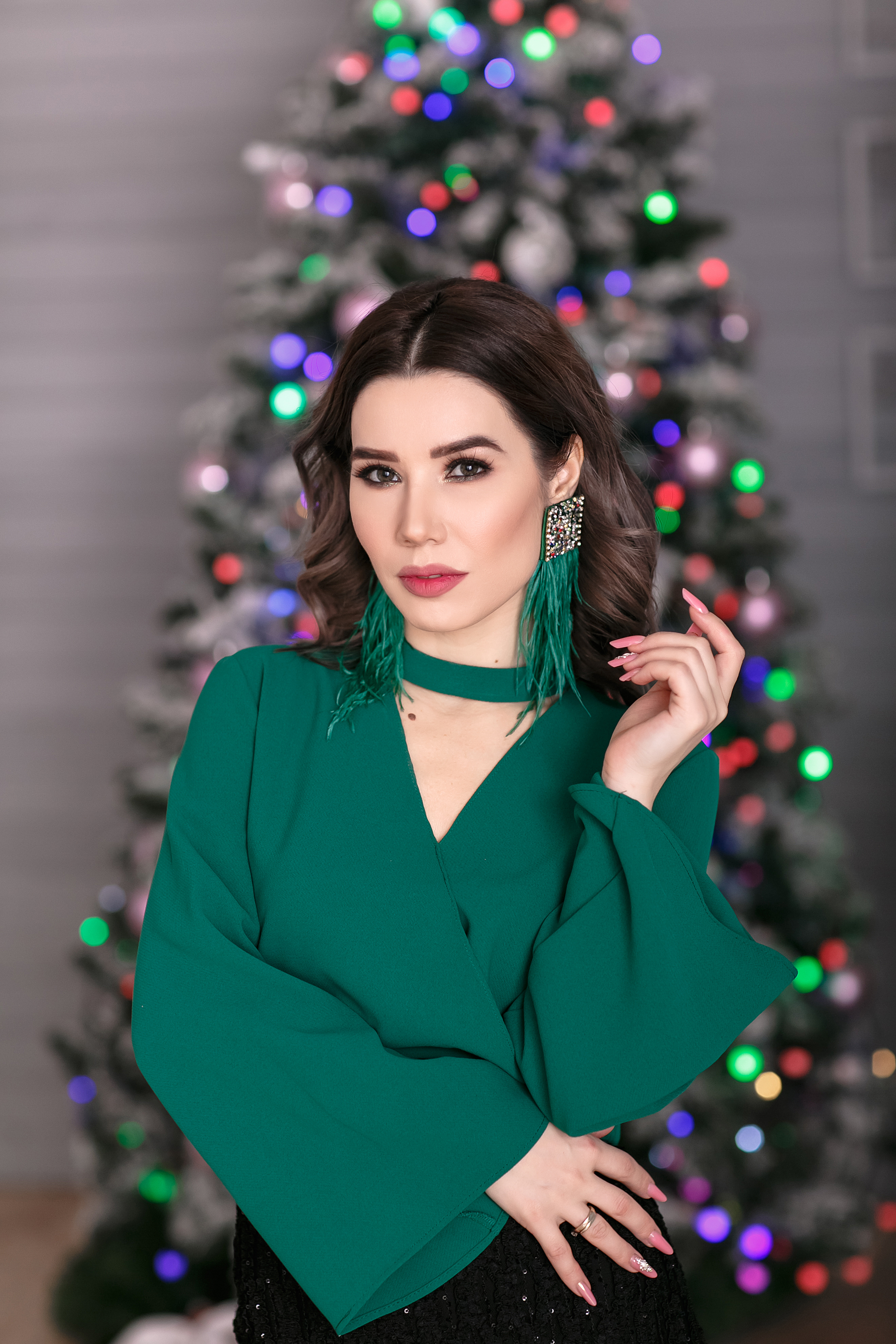

Background information
- Born: 4 June 1985 (age 40); Shevchenko, Kazakh SSR, USSR
- Origin: Makhachkala, Dagestan
- Genres: pop music, Contemporary R&B
- Occupations: singer (singer-songwriter), dancer, model, actress
- Years active: 2002–present
- Labels: Melodiya

Marina Nazimovna Alieva (Russian: Марина Назимовна Алиева, Rutul: Алиева Марина Назимовна, born 4 June 1985 in Shevchenko) is a Russian female singer, actress, dancer and songwriter, Merited Artist of the Republic of Dagestan.

== Biography ==
=== Youth ===
She was born in the city of Shevchenko (now Aktau) in the Kazakh SSR. Her father, a Rutul, is former police officer from Izberbash, visually impaired. Her mother is a Lezgin. Marina has four sisters and one brother. Her family moved from Kazakhstan to Izberbash, Dagestan when Marina was 14 years old.

Marina graduated from 2nd High School, during her education she performed multiple times with songs and dances. Her debut was the victory at the song contest My hearth and home, Dagestan, also Marina was the teacher of dancing at her school. Her first big concert was in 2001 at the Young Voices song contest, where Marina won 1st place.

=== Career ===
Marina entered the Faculty of Musical arts of Dagestan State Pedagogical University in 2002, later she became the Faculty of Pedagogic Studies student. Her vocal coach was Siydzhana Beimurazova, the musical school teacher. In 2005 Marina took part in TV series Dance Floor Star of MTV Russia, and she reached the final as the only Dagestan representative (runner-up of the show). Despite her success, Marina was heavily criticized and got a lot of letters with insults and threats.

Her first composition "Tantsy pod lunoi" (Dances under the Moon) was written by Marina and her friend, later her first video "Prosti" (Forgive) was released. She recorded songs with Timur Umarov "Ya ne mogu tak zhit'" (I can't live this way), "Na tantspole" (On the dance floor) and "Day mne znat'" (Give me to know). After releasing "Ya ukhozhu" (I leave) she took a big break before her comeback with songs on Lezgin language called "My love" and "The only one". Her first album "2 Live 4 Music" was released in 2009 together with arranged solo concert. Marina is known for her co-work with Merited Artist of the Republic of Dagestan and popular singer Aslan Guseynov; their song "Gde ty" (released in English as "Tell Me") got to the Golden Grammophone music chart of Russkoye Radio. Marina is the author of more than 60 songs.

Marina performs at many festivals, including folk culture festivals of Caucasus in Moscow, concerts in cities of Russia and Baku, Azerbaijan. She starred in the sitcom "Gortsy ot uma" in 2008—2011 year and was in the jury of World Art & Fashion 2012 festival in Kemer, Turkey.

== Discography ==
- 2009 – 2 Live 4 Music
- 2011 – Иллюзии (Illusions)
- 2011 – Играй С Огнём (Play With Fire)
- 2012 – О любви (About Love)

== Filmography ==
- 2008—2011 – Горцы от ума (Highlanders from Wit)
