= Yuriy Goltsev =

Belarusian footballer

Personal information
- Date of birth: 19 September 1995 (age 31)
- Place of birth: Grodno, Belarus
- Height: 1.86 m (6 ft 1 in)
- Position: Defender

Team information
- Current team: Ożarowianka Ożarów Maz.
- Number: 6

Youth career
- 2013–2014: Neman Grodno

Senior career*
Years	Team	Apps	(Gls)
2012	Belcard Grodno	14	(0)
2014–2017	Neman Grodno	4	(0)
2016–2017	→ Lida (loan)	48	(0)
2021	Okęcie Warsaw	16	(1)
2022	Płomien Dębe Wielkie	11	(0)
2023–	Ożarowianka Ożarów Maz.	29	(1)
- * Club domestic league appearances and goals as of 6 August 2024

Yuriy Goltsev (Belarusian: Юрый Гольцаў; Russian: Юрий Гольцев; born 19 September 1995) is a Belarusian footballer who plays as a defender for Polish V liga club Ożarowianka Ożarów Mazowiecki, where he also serves as a youth coach.

== Honours ==
Ożarowianka Ożarów Mazowiecki

- Regional league Warsaw II: 2022–23
