= Aleksandr Filanovich =

Belarusian professional footballer

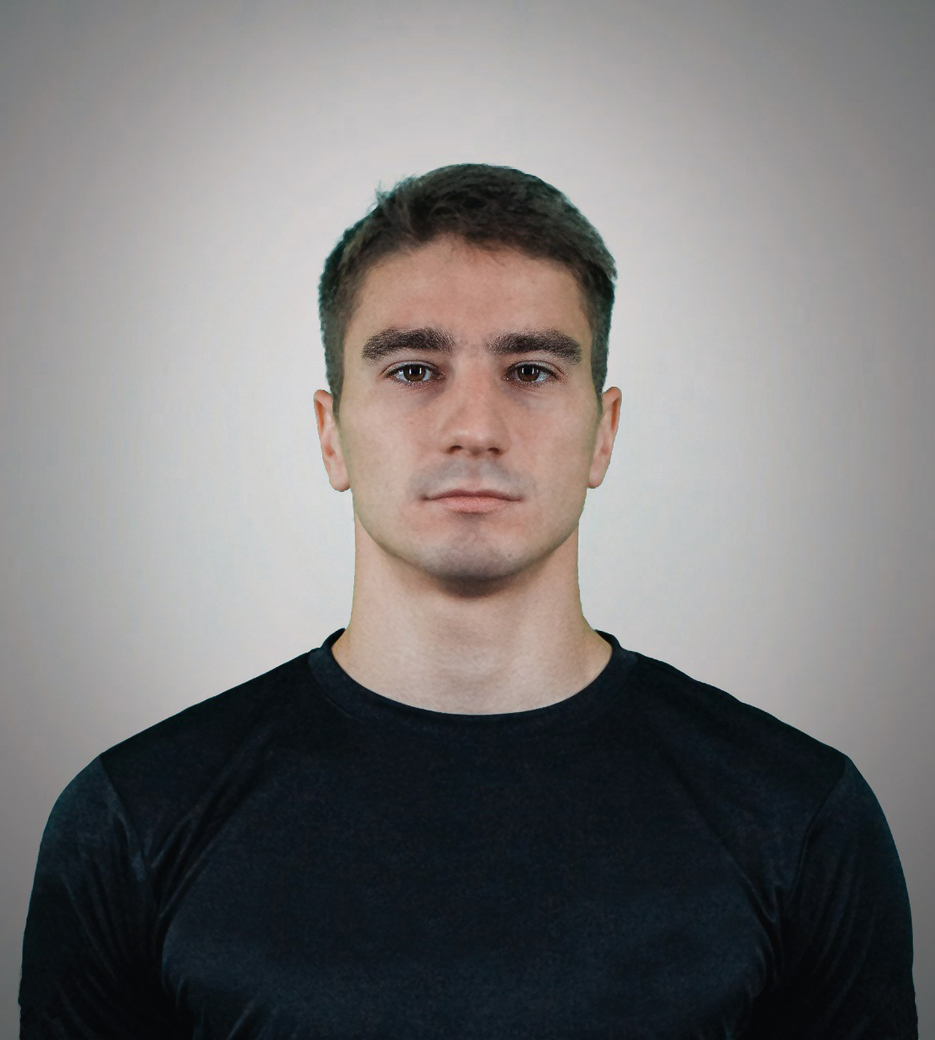

Personal information
- Date of birth: 1 December 1992 (age 33)
- Place of birth: Minsk, Belarus
- Height: 1.75 m (5 ft 9 in)
- Position: Forward

Youth career
- 2012–2013: Amateur Football League (Minsk)

Senior career*
Years	Team	Apps	(Gls)
2013	Molodechno-2013	10	(0)
2014–2016	Luch Minsk	63	(21)
2016–2017	Krumkachy Minsk	27	(3)
2018	Torpedo Minsk	17	(0)
2019	Naftan Novopolotsk	24	(0)
- * Club domestic league appearances and goals as of 31 December 2019

Aleksandr Filanovich (Belarusian: Аляксандр Філановіч; Russian: Александр Филанович; born 1 December 1992) is a Belarusian former professional footballer.

== Career ==
Filanovich spent early career playing for various clubs in the Minsk-based Amateur Football League (ALF), before being recruited by Luch Minsk in 2014.
