= Sergey Kubarev =

Belarusian footballer

Personal information
- Date of birth: 17 June 1992 (age 34)
- Place of birth: Zhodino, Belarus
- Height: 1.80 m (5 ft 11 in)
- Position: Midfielder

Youth career
- 2008: MTZ-RIPO Minsk
- 2009–2010: Torpedo Zhodino

Senior career*
Years	Team	Apps	(Gls)
2010	Gomel-2	5	(0)
2011–2012	Gomel	1	(0)
- * Club domestic league appearances and goals as of 22 December 2012

Sergey Kubarev (Belarusian: Сяргей Кубараў; Russian: Серге́й Кубарев; born 17 June 1992) is a Belarusian former professional footballer. He is a son of Belarusian coach Oleg Kubarev.
