= Vitaly Rudakovskiy =

Belarusian bodybuilder (born 1976)

- professional bodybuilder

Personal info
- Born: June 5, 1976 (age 49); Minsk, Belarus

Best statistics

Professional (Pro) career
- Best win: East European Bodybuilding Championships (overall); 2010

Vitaly Rudakovskiy (Belarusian: Віталь Рудакоўскі; Russian: Виталий Рудаковский; born June 5, 1976) is a Belarusian bodybuilder.

== Biography ==
Born in Minsk, he started strength training as a teenager. The winner or finalist of many bodybuilding competitions, organized at national and European level. In 2009, he won the Cup of the North-West Russia in heavy weight category (100 kg). He was placed second in heavy weight at '09 Russian Cup, and fifth place in professional league at 2011 Grand Prix Fitness House. He won 2011 Russian Bodybuilding Championships in heavy weight (up to 100 kg). Rudakovskiy's best win is, however, the first place he acquired overall during the East European Bodybuilding Championships in 2010. He lives in Saint Petersburg, Russia, and works as a personal trainer.

== Partial contest history ==
- 2012 Bodybuilding, Fitness & Bikini Championships/Alexander Vishnevsky Cup − 1st place overall
- 2011 Russian Bodybuilding Championships − 1st place in heavy weight (up to 100 kg)
- 2011 Grand Prix Fitness House − 5th place in professional league
- 2011 Arnold Amateur Europe − IFBB − 11th place in heavy weight
- 2010 East European Bodybuilding Championships − 1st place overall
- 2009 Russian Cup − 2nd place in heavy weight (100 kg)
- 2009 Cup of the North-West Russia − 1st place in heavy weight (100 kg)
- 2009 Cup of the North-West Russia − 3rd place in "open" category
