= Yegor Alekseyenko =

Belarusian professional footballer

Personal information
- Date of birth: 31 October 1998 (age 28)
- Place of birth: Belarus
- Height: 1.74 m (5 ft 8 1/2 in)
- Position: Forward

Youth career
- 2013–2017: Gorodeya

Senior career*
Years	Team	Apps	(Gls)
2017–2018	Gorodeya	1	(0)
- * Club domestic league appearances and goals as of 31 December 2018

Yegor Alekseyenko (Belarusian: Ягор Аляксеенка; Russian: Егор Алексеенко; born 31 October 1998) is a Belarusian former professional footballer.

After leaving Gorodeya in 2018, Alekseyenko moved to Israel, where he played for some amateur teams.
