= Artem Shut =

Belarusian footballer

Personal information
- Date of birth: 18 June 1995 (age 31)
- Place of birth: Mozyr, Belarus
- Position: Defender

Youth career
- 2013–2014: Slavia Mozyr

Senior career*
Years	Team	Apps	(Gls)
2014–2018	Slavia Mozyr	9	(0)
- * Club domestic league appearances and goals as of 9 December 2018

Artem Shut (Belarusian: Арцём Шут; Russian: Артём Шут; born 18 June 1995) is a Belarusian former professional footballer.

== Career statistics ==
Season	Division	Club	Country	Apps	Goals
2013	Reserve team	Slavia	Belarus	21	0
2014	Second tier	Slavia	Belarus	3	0
2015	First tier	Slavia	Belarus	6	0
2016	Reserve team	Slavia	Belarus	12	0
2017	Reserve team	Slavia	Belarus	13	0
2018	Second tier	Slavia	Belarus	0	0
