= Vyacheslav Gretsky =

Belarusian ice hockey player

- Born: December 23, 1996 (age 29) Grodno, Belarus
- Height: 6 ft 5 in (196 cm)
- Weight: 218 lb (99 kg; 15 st 8 lb)
- Position: Centre
- Shoots: Left
- BXL team Former teams: Neman Grodno; HC Dinamo Minsk; Amur Khabarovsk
- Playing career: 2019–present

Vyacheslav Gretsky (born December 23, 1996) is a Belarusian professional ice hockey centre for HK Neman Grodno in the Belarusian Extraleague (BXL).

== Playing career ==
Gretsky made his professional debut for the Kontinental Hockey League's HC Dinamo Minsk in 2019 following a trial and played in 19 regular season games, scoring one goal and two assists. He was voted into the 2020 KHL All-Star Game by fans. He wears the number 99. as did his soundalike, Wayne Gretzky. He tried out for HK Neman Grodno of the Belarusian Extraleague in 2021.

From August 23, 2022, Gretsky played for Amur Khabarovsk in the KHL. He remained with the club for three seasons, before returning to HC Dinamo Minsk as a free agent in signing a one-year contract for the 2025–26 season on 21 August 2025.
