= Artur Semenov =

Belarusian footballer

Personal information
- Date of birth: 21 October 1994 (age 32)
- Place of birth: Vitebsk, Belarus
- Height: 1.87 m (6 ft 1 1/2 in)
- Position: Goalkeeper

Youth career
- 2009–2010: Vitebsk
- 2010–2013: Dinamo Minsk

Senior career*
Years	Team	Apps	(Gls)
2014–2015	Bereza-2010	16	(0)
2016–2018	Naftan Novopolotsk	8	(0)
2019	Granit Mikashevichi	0	(0)
2019	Slonim-2017	1	(0)
2021	Prodtsentr Vitebsk	6	(0)
2022	Gorodok Lions	1	(0)

International career
2010	Belarus U17	3	(0)
- * Club domestic league appearances and goals as of 31 December 2022

Artur Semenov (Belarusian: Артур Сямёнаў; Russian: Артур Семёнов; born 21 October 1994) is a Belarusian professional footballer.
