= Vladislav Kuzhal =

Belarusian footballer

Personal information
- Date of birth: 12 February 1998 (age 28)
- Place of birth: Minsk, Belarus
- Height: 1.85 m (6 ft 1 in)
- Position: Goalkeeper

Youth career
- 2012–2016: Minsk

Senior career*
| Years | Team | Apps | (Gls) |
| 2016–2017 | Dinamo Brest | 1 | (0) |
| 2018 | Energetik-BGU Minsk | 6 | (0) |
- * Club domestic league appearances and goals as of 31 December 2018

Vladislav Kuzhal (Belarusian: Уладзіслаў Кужаль; Russian: Владислав Кужаль; born 12 February 1998) is a Belarusian former professional footballer.

== Honours ==
Dinamo Brest

- Belarusian Cup winner: 2016–17
