= Uladzimir Malyshaw =

Belarusian footballer and coach

Personal information
- Full name: Uladzimir Mikalayevich Malyshaw
- Date of birth: 22 August 1969 (age 57)
- Place of birth: Dobrush, Belarusian SSR
- Height: 1.85 m (6 ft 1 in)
- Position: Goalkeeper

Team information
- Current team: Kazanka Moscow (assistant manager)

Youth career
- 1986–1989: Dinamo Minsk

Senior career*
Years	Team	Apps	(Gls)
1989	Sputnik Minsk		
1990–1992	Lada Togliatti	16	(0)
1992–1994	Molodechno	57	(0)
1995	Lantana Tallinn	8	(0)
1996	Neman Grodno	20	(0)
1997–2000	Liepājas Metalurgs	21	(0)

Managerial career
- 2014: Volga Nizhny Novgorod (assistant)
- 2016–2018: Chertanovo Moscow (assistant)
- 2016: Chertanovo Moscow (caretaker)
- 2018–: Kazanka Moscow (assistant)
- * Club domestic league appearances and goals

Uladzimir Mikalayevich Malyshaw (Belarusian: Уладзімір Мікалаевіч Малышаў; Russian: Владимир Николаевич Малышев; born 22 August 1969) is a Belarusian football coach and a former player. He is an assistant manager with FC Kazanka Moscow.
