= Viktor Bezmen =

Belarusian footballer

Personal information
- Date of birth: 26 November 1961 (age 64)
- Place of birth: Syenitsa, Minsk District, Belarusian SSR
- Position: Defender

Youth career
- 1978–1981: Dinamo Minsk

Senior career*
Years	Team	Apps	(Gls)
1982–1983	Orbita Minsk		
1984–1997	Lokomotiv-96 Vitebsk	351	(30)
1998–1999	Vitbich-Dinamo-Energo	49	(1)

International career
1996–1997	Belarus	4	(0)
- * Club domestic league appearances and goals

Viktor Bezmen (Belarusian: Віктар Бязмен; Russian: Виктор Безмен; born 26 November 1961) is a retired Belarusian professional footballer and Belarus international.

He spent the majority of his career (13 years) playing for Lokomotiv-96 Vitebsk (formerly KIM, Dvina, Vityaz) in Soviet Second League and later in Belarusian Premier League. After retirement, he worked at administrative and coaching positions at Ministry of Emergency Situations and later as a youth coach at SDYuSShOR Dvina in Vitebsk.
