= Liubou Bialova =

Belarusian weightlifter

Liubou Bialova (Russian: Любовь Леонидовна Белова, born April 7, 1960) is a Belarusian weightlifter.

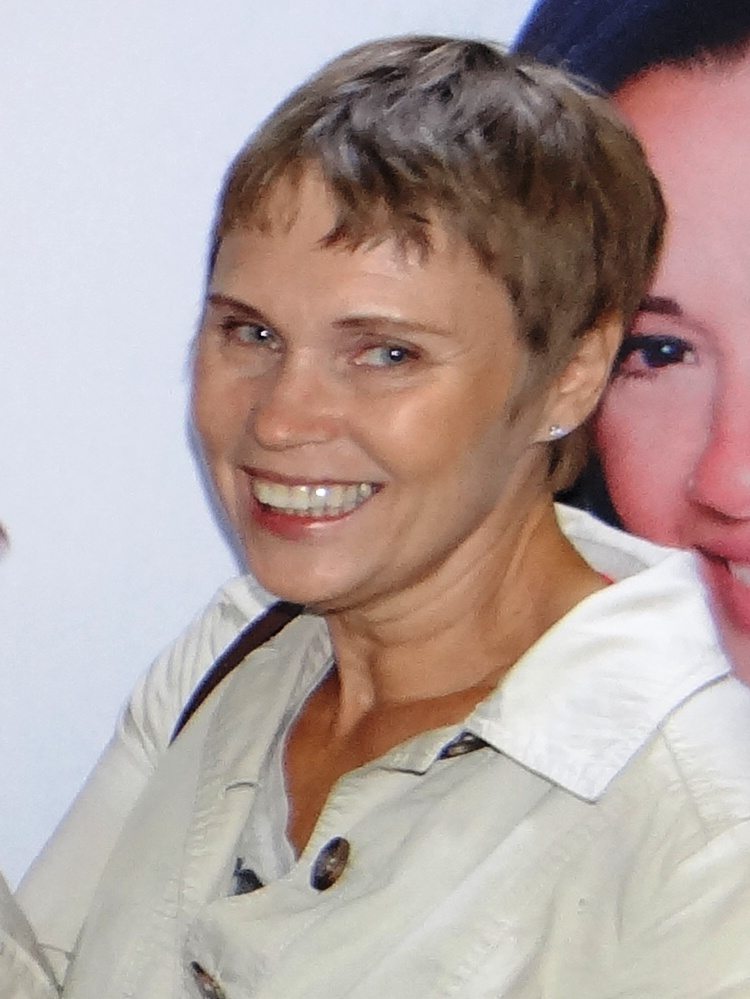
Liubou Bialova at Europa Games in Orlando, 2014

She has won gold medals in national, European and world championships and has set world records during her athletic career. The President of Belarus honored her with the nation's top sports award, the "Honoured Master Sport the Republic of Belarus" Bialova is an International Powerlifting Federation champion and world record holder in the bench press. She is a four-time gold medalist and European champion in bench press. She is a senior coach at the School of Olympic Reserve and athletics trainer-instructor for disabled people in Paralympics sport. Liubou Bialova is the Florida Champion of Senior Games in the bench press.

== Early life and education ==
Bialova was born April 7, 1960, in Gomel, the Republic of Belarus, with brother Nicolai Grishanov (twin). She comes from a champion sports family: her brother was national champion in weightlifting and multiple champion in bodybuilding in the former Soviet Union.

Bialova pursued a sports education in addition to her sports career. In 1977 graduated high school #12 in Gomel. 1983 graduated Gomel Suhoi State Technical University. She completed sports-related studies and obtained degrees from various schools. A three-year study in Gomel Francyck Skarina State University (subject physical culture). 2002 Belarusian State Academy of Physical Culture.

== Sports career ==
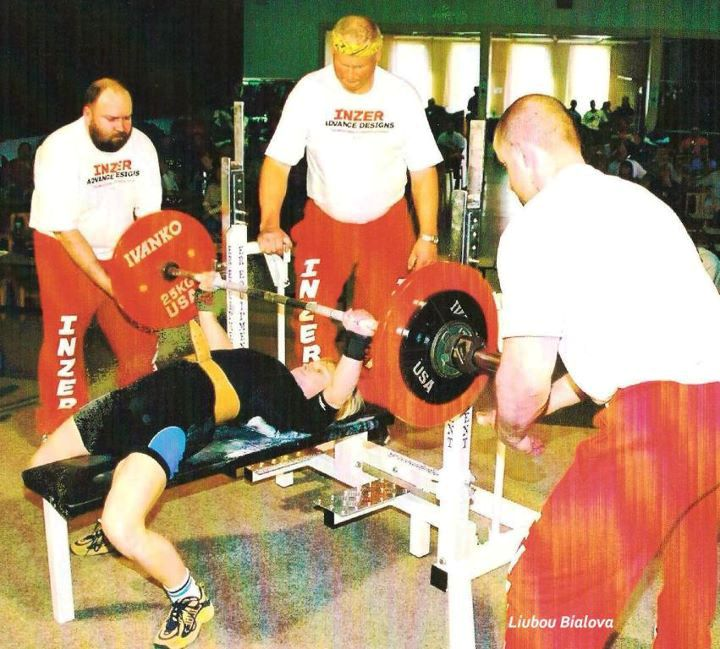
Liubou Bialova IPF Single Bench Press Championship

Bialova is a universal athlete, multi-world champion (IPF) and world record holder in bench press. She is a four-time gold medalist and European champion in bench press (|EPF). She is a senior coach at the School of Olympic Reserve and athletics trainer-instructor for disabled people in Paralympics sport.

=== Athletics ===
Her athletic achievements began early. At 14 years of age she was third in the Former Soviet Union in Soviet pentathlon (crawl-swimming, sprint (running), throw-Javelin, long jump, cross country) were part of many stellar sports achievements from the early start.

=== Bodybuilding ===
Bialova took her experience to bodybuilding. She was a three-time national bodybuilding champion of Belarus. She was awarded in the US for her performances. Bialova was awarded Weider Certificate of Merit from International Federation (IFBB) of Body Builders.

=== Powerlifting ===
Bialova was the first woman champion of the Republic of Belarus in powerlifting. A three-time champion of the Republic of Belarus.

== Bench press (single lift) ==
Multiple National Bench-Press Champion of Belarus. Three-time World Champion (IPF) and World Record Holder in bench press. A four-time gold medalist and European champion in bench press (EPF).

=== Starts ===
Year	Federation / Meet	Place	Weight	Age	Body wt	Total	Date	Venue
1993	4th IPF Bench Press Championships	2	56	O	55.80	92.5	dec 9–11, 1993	Budapest
1994	5th IPF Bench Press Championships	1	56	O	55.50	100	dec 3–4, 1994	Järvenpää
1995	European Bench Press Championships	1	60	O	59.60	115	dec 8–9, 1995	Budapest
1995	6th IPF Bench Press Championships	2	56	O	55.90	107.5	dec 23–24, 1995	Frýdek-Místek
1996	7th IPF Bench Press Championships	1	56	O	55.90	110wr	nov 28–30, 1996	Silkeborg
1997	European Bench Press Championships	1	56	O	55.80	120	aug 14–16, 1997	Gothenburg
1998	European Bench Press Championships	2	56	O	55.50	105	aug 5–7, 1998	Trenčín
1998	9th IPF Bench Press Championships	1	60	O	59.40	120	nov 9 – dec 11, 1998	Amberg
1999	European Bench Press Championships	2	56	O	55.40	110	aug 5–7, 1999	Győr
1999	10th IPF Bench Press Championships	2	56	O	56.00	117.5	dec 7–10, 1999	Vaasa
2000	European Bench Press Championships	1	60	M1	58.80	110	jul 27–29, 2000	Jelgava
2000	11th IPF Bench Press Championships	3	56	O	55.70	110	dec 6–7, 2000	Frýdek-Místek
2001	European Bench Press Championships	1	56	O	55.90	120	aug 9–11, 2001	Jūrmala
2003	World Bench Press Championships	2	60	M1	57.00	102.5	apr 15–19, 2003	Nymburk
2003	14th IPF Bench Press Championships	4	52	O	51.40	105	dec 4–6, 2003	Trenčín

=== Records ===
 Fed  Age cls  Wt cls   Body wt          Event                  Record        Date, Location, Meet

 IPF      O	 56	 55.5	  Bench press (single-lift)	  100	    December 2, 1994, Järvenpää
 EPF	  O	 60	 59.6	  Bench press (single-lift)	  115	    December 8, 1995, Budapest
 IPF      O	 56	 55.9	  Bench press (single-lift)	  110	    November 28, 1996, Silkeborg
 IPF	  O	 56	 56	  Bench press (single-lift)	  117.5	    December 7, 1999, Vaasa
 EPF	  O	 56	 55.8	  Bench press (single-lift)	  120	    August 15, 1997, Gothenburg
 IPF	  O	 56	 56	  Bench press (single-lift)	  112.5	    December 7, 1999, Vaasa

== Coach career ==
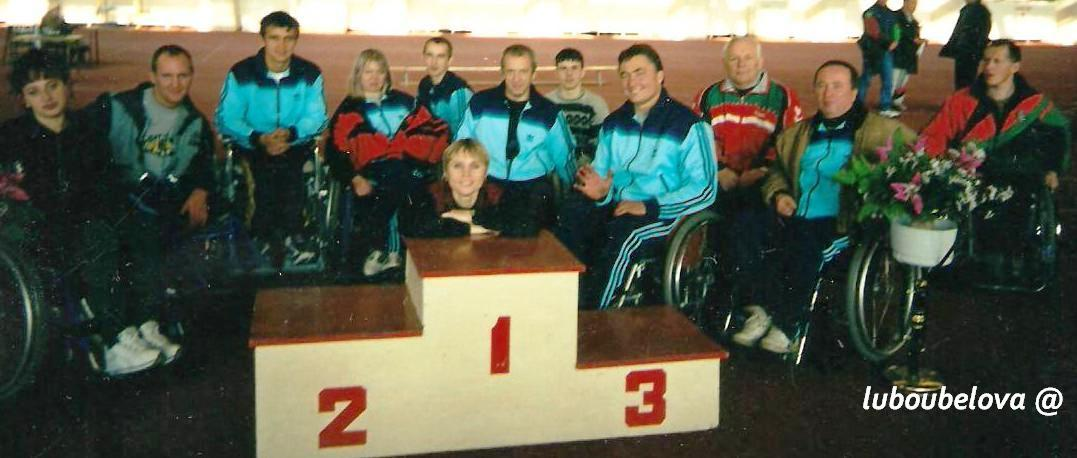
Head coach Lubou Bialova with Belarusian Paralympic Team

Bialova’s firsthand knowledge of sports as a champion athlete and in-depth education in sports, sports physiology, nutrition and peak performance gives her unique skills and experience. Her work with disabled and Paralympic (IPC) athletes sets her apart from other coaches and trainers.

Since 1977 she has worked as a coach in varied forms of athletics. 1984–1991 coach and swimming trainer for 1- to 6-year-olds. 1992–2013 as coach School of Olympic Reserve in powerlifting, bodybuilding, athletics trainer-instructor disabled and senior aged people. Bialova was head coach of the women's national powerlifting team. Her students, in several sports, became national champions and participants of world and European championships. Senior coach School of Olympic Reserve, Bialova has thirteen years working with athletes in wheelchairs. Bialova made an enormous contribution to the development of Paralympics in Republic of Belarus. She organized and conducted sport’s camps for wheelchair users. Participation in her training process allowed wheelchair users to overcome psychological barriers and inferiority issues that comes with disabilities. Her training abilities renewed abilities and capabilities of her students. They were able to move more freely and eliminate many barriers.

Bialova has many awards and commendations from public and government organization. She his great skills with able-bodied who simply look for a healthy and fit life style. Her skills and training regimens have proven results for elite athletes training for peak performance. Bialova has a well-earned and well-deserved reputation for work with the elderly, impaired and disabled.

== Honors and awards ==
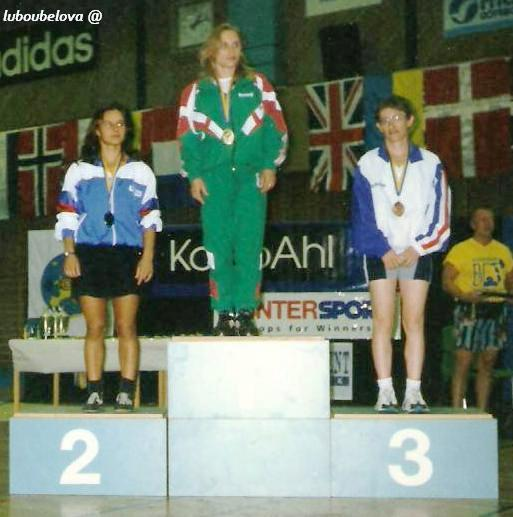
Liubou Bialova IPF 10 World Single Bench Press Championship 1999 Vaasa, Finland

- Three Gold Medalist World Champion (IPF) in Bench press (Single lift).
- Four Silver Medalist World Championships (IPF) in Bench press (Single lift).
- Bronze Medalist World Championships (IPF) in Bench press (Single lift).
- Four Gold Medalist and European Champion Bench Press (EPF).
- Two Silver Medalist Europe Championships (EPF) in Bench press (Single lift).
- Multiple National Powerlifting Champion of Belarus.
- Multiple National Bodybuilding Champion of Belarus.
- Awarded Weider Certificate of Merit International Federation (IFBB) of Body Builders.
- Awarded Certificate of Merit for work with disabled people in Belarus.

The President of Republic of Belarus (Decree #445, September 14, 1998) awarded Bialova the highest sport award the country’s: “Honored Sport Master the Republic of Belarus” for achieving excellence in sports, great personal contribution to the development of physical culture and sports.
