= Ahmedin Jemal =

American cancer epidemiologist

- Born: Ahmedin Muktar Jemal
- Citizenship: American
- Education: Addis Ababa University; Louisiana State University
- Scientific career
- Fields: Cancer epidemiology
- Institutions: American Cancer Society
- Thesis: Identification and Quantification of S-(2-(N(7)-Guanyl)ethyl)glutathione DNA Adduct in Channel Catfish (Ictalurus Punctatus) After Exposure to 1,2-Dichloroethane (1997)
- Doctoral advisor: Martin E. Hugh-Jones

Ahmedin Muktar Jemal is an American cancer epidemiologist who serves as senior vice president of the Surveillance & Health Equity Science Department of the American Cancer Society. He has been researching racial differences in lung cancer rates since the mid-1990s, when he was a fellow at the National Cancer Institute.
