= Illya Aliyew =

Belarusian professional footballer

Personal information
- Date of birth: 20 May 1991 (age 35)
- Place of birth: Zelva, Grodno Oblast, Belarusian SSR
- Position: Midfielder

Youth career
- 2009–2010: Neman Grodno

Senior career*
Years	Team	Apps	(Gls)
2010	Neman Grodno	2	(0)
2011	Belcard Grodno	8	(1)
2011	Neman Mosty	4	(0)
2013–2014	Slonim City		
2018	Chayka Zelva		
2019–2020	Gloria Bistrița		
2022–2023	Chayka Zelva	11	(2)
- * Club domestic league appearances and goals ‡ National team caps and goals as of 31 December 2023

Illya Aliyew (Belarusian: Илля Аліеў; Russian: Илья Алиев; born 20 May 1991) is a Belarusian professional footballer who plays as a midfielder.

== Personal life ==
Aliyew is engaged with Belarusian handball player Natallia Vasileuskaya.
