= Jemal Kurshubadze =

Belarusian professional footballer

Personal information
- Date of birth: 22 April 1997 (age 29)
- Place of birth: Minsk, Belarus
- Height: 1.83 m (6 ft 0 in)
- Position: Goalkeeper

Youth career
- 2014–2018: Minsk

Senior career*
| Years | Team | Apps | (Gls) |
| 2014–2018 | Minsk | 0 | (0) |
| 2019 | Isloch Minsk Raion | 0 | (0) |
| 2020 | Smolevichi | 5 | (0) |

International career
| 2017 | Belarus U21 | 1 | (0) |
- * Club domestic league appearances and goals as of 31 December 2020

Jemal Kurshubadze (Belarusian: Джэмал Куршубадзэ; Russian: Джемал Куршубадзе; born 22 April 1997) is a Belarusian former professional footballer.
