= Jemal Gokieli =

Georgian conductor

- Born: July 4, 1920; Kutaisi, Georgia
- Died: April 14, 1991 (aged 70) Tbilisi, Georgia
- Genres: Classical
- Occupation: Conductor
- Years active: 1944–1991

Jemal Gokieli (Georgian: ჯემალ გოკიელი; July 4, 1920 – April 14, 1991) was a Georgian conductor.

== Biography ==
Jemal (Djemal) Gokieli was born on 4 July 1920 in Kutaisi, Western Georgia, into the family of a prominent Georgian composer Ivan Rafailovich Gokieli. In his childhood, he used to play on organ in the Catholic church of Kutaisi.

In the 1940s, he studied conducting at Tbilisi and Moscow Conservatories where his tutors were Odysseas Dimitriadi, Grigori Stoliarov and Aleksandr Gauk.

From 1944 until 1948, he worked as a conductor at Tbilisi State Opera and Ballet Theatre.

From 1948 until his death on 14 April 1991, he was a conductor of the Georgian State Symphony Orchestra.

During his career, he held more than 1100 concerts as in his native Tbilisi and other Georgian towns but also in many different places of the Soviet Union, like Moscow, Saint Petersburg and other Russian cities, as well as in all former Soviet Republics. He had concert tours in Poland, Yugoslavia and Romania. His concert activities outside the USSR were limited due to Soviet regime regulations.

Gokieli had conducted a number of different symphony orchestras and had performed with a such outstanding musicians as Sviatoslav Richter, Heinrich Neuhaus, David Oistrakh, Maria Yudina, Tatiana Nikolayeva, Gidon Kremer, Vladimir Spivakov, Elisso Virsaladze, Marina Iashvili, Liana Isakadze and others.
