= Leanid Harai =

Soviet footballer and manager (1937–2019)

Personal information
- Full name: Leanid Paulavich Harai
- Date of birth: 13 January 1937
- Place of birth: Gomel, Byelorussian SSR, Soviet Union (now Belarus)
- Date of death: 5 August 2019 (aged 82)
- Place of death: Minsk, Belarus
- Position: Defender

Youth career
- –1955: FShM Minsk
- 1956–1957: Spartak Minsk

Senior career*
Years	Team	Apps	(Gls)
1958–1959	Spartak Minsk	43	(0)
1960	FC Urozhay Minsk	32	(0)
1961	Belarus Minsk	9	(0)
1962–1963	SKA Minsk	43	(0)
1964–1966	Spartak Brest	45	(0)

Managerial career
- 1966–1968: Spartak Brest (assistant)
- 1969–1970: Spartak Brest (director)
- 1976–1978: Dinamo Brest (director)
- 1978–1986: Dinamo Minsk (director)
- 1988–1993: Dinamo Minsk (director)
- * Club domestic league appearances and goals

Leanid Paulavich Harai (Belarusian: Леанід Паўлавіч Гарай; Russian: Леонид Павлович Гарай; 13 January 1937 – 5 August 2019) was a Soviet footballer and manager.

== Playing career ==
Harai's father was killed in World War II when he was age 4. After the war, Harai began playing football at school in Brest and then Minsk. He would join FC Spartak Minsk's senior side where he began playing in the second-tier Soviet Class B league. In 1960, Harai joined FC Urozhay Minsk. The following season he joined FC Belarus Minsk, a club composed of several former Spartak and Urozhay players, which competed in the 1961 Soviet Top League. Harai finished his playing career with spells at FC SKA Minsk and FC Spartak Brest.

== Coaching career ==
After he retired from playing, Harai embarked on a managerial career. He led FC Spartak Brest to its highest-ever level in Soviet football, reaching the 1969 Soviet Class A Second Group.
