= Alyaksey Pohe =

Belarusian footballer

Personal information
- Date of birth: 9 April 1977 (age 49)
- Height: 1.81 m (5 ft 11 1/2 in)
- Position: Goalkeeper

Senior career*
Years	Team	Apps	(Gls)
1994–1995	Lokomotiv Vitebsk	5	(0)
1996–2001	Lokomotiv-96 Vitebsk	50	(0)
1997–2000	→ Lokomotiv Vitebsk	36	(0)
2002	Belshina Bobruisk	6	(0)
2003–2004	Lokomotiv Vitebsk	43	(0)
2005–2006	Naftan Novopolotsk	14	(0)
2007–2009	Smorgon	31	(0)
2010	Polotsk	14	(0)
2011	Khimik Svetlogorsk	10	(0)
- * Club domestic league appearances and goals

Alyaksey Pohe (Belarusian: Аляксей Поге; Russian: Алексей Поге; born 9 April 1977) is a retired Belarusian professional footballer.
