= Dzmitry Rabtsaw =

Belarusian footballer

Personal information
- Date of birth: 16 August 1991 (age 35)
- Place of birth: Gomel, Belarusian SSR
- Height: 1.77 m (5 ft 9 1/2 in)
- Position: Midfielder

Team information
- Current team: Leskhoz Gomel (manager)

Youth career
- 2007–2009: Gomel

Senior career*
Years	Team	Apps	(Gls)
2009–2010	Gomel	10	(0)
2010–2011	Vedrich-97 Rechytsa	26	(0)
2012	DSK Gomel	20	(1)
2013	Polotsk	7	(0)
2022–2023	Leskhoz Gomel	6	(1)

Managerial career
- 2021–: Leskhoz Gomel
- * Club domestic league appearances and goals as of 31 December 2023

Dzmitry Rabtsaw (Belarusian: Дзмітрый Рабцаў; Russian: Дмитрий Александрович Рябцев; born 16 August 1991) is a Belarusian professional football coach and former player.
