= Alyaksey Dvaretski =

Belarusian footballer

Personal information
- Date of birth: 17 December 1977 (age 48)
- Height: 1.76 m (5 ft 9 1/2 in)
- Position: Defender

Senior career*
Years	Team	Apps	(Gls)
1995	Fomalgaut Borisov	3	(0)
1996–1999	Zvezda-VA-BGU Minsk	84	(2)
2000–2001	Wigry Suwałki		
2001–2003	Zvezda-VA-BGU Minsk	65	(8)
2004–2006	Dinamo Brest	53	(2)
2007–2013	Smorgon	80	(0)

Managerial career
- 2014–2017: Smorgon (assistant)
- 2017: Smorgon
- 2018–2019: Smorgon
- * Club domestic league appearances and goals

Alyaksey Dvaretski (Belarusian: Аляксей Дварэцкі; Russian: Алексей Дворецкий; born 17 December 1977) is a Belarusian professional football coach and former player.
