= Yevgeniy Kostyukevich =

Belarusian footballer

Personal information
- Date of birth: 19 December 1989 (age 36)
- Place of birth: Zhodino, Minsk Oblast, Belarusian SSR
- Height: 1.87 m (6 ft 1 1/2 in)
- Position: Goalkeeper

Youth career
- 2007–2008: Torpedo Zhodino

Senior career*
Years	Team	Apps	(Gls)
2008–2009	Torpedo Zhodino	0	(0)
2015–2019	Krumkachy Minsk	47	(1)
- * Club domestic league appearances and goals as of 31 December 2019

Yevgeniy Kostyukevich (Belarusian: Яўген Касцюкевіч; Russian: Евгений Костюкевич; born 19 December 1989) is a Belarusian former professional footballer.

== Career ==
Kostyukevich spent his youth years at Torpedo Zhodino and went on trial to CSKA Moscow in summer 2008. However, due to health issues discovered during the trial the contract was not signed. The same issues eventually forced him to end his career in late 2009. In summer 2015 Kostyukevich restarted his playing career at Krumkachy Minsk despite originally joining the team as goalkeeper coach and videographer.
