= Alyaksey Tarabanaw =

Belarusian footballer

Personal information
- Date of birth: 3 May 1984 (age 42)
- Place of birth: Grodno, Byelorussian SSR, Soviet Union
- Height: 1.78 m (5 ft 10 in)
- Position: Midfielder

Youth career
- Belcard Grodno

Senior career*
Years	Team	Apps	(Gls)
2002–2005	Slavia Mozyr	25	(1)
2006–2008	Dinamo-Belcard Grodno	79	(12)
2009–2010	Dinamo Brest	22	(0)
2010	Belcard Grodno	11	(1)
2011	Dnepr Mogilev	1	(0)
2011–2012	Belcard Grodno	29	(6)
2014	Tsementnik Krasnoselsky		
2019	PK Kremko Kvasovka		
2021	ZhKKh Grodno	7	(2)

International career
2002	Belarus U21	2	(0)
- * Club domestic league appearances and goals as of 31 December 2021

Alyaksey Tarabanaw (Belarusian: Аляксей Тарабанаў; Russian: Алексей Тарабанов; born 3 May 1984) is a retired Belarusian professional footballer.
