= 2011–12 Belarusian Cup =

Tournament details
- Country: Belarus
- Teams: 48

Final positions
- Champions: Naftan Novopolotsk (2nd title)
- Runners-up: Minsk

Tournament statistics
- Matches played: 47
- Goals scored: 186 (3.96 per match)
- Top goal scorer(s): Andrey Razin; Yuri Korolyuk; Yuri Syrokvashko (4 goals)

The 2011–12 Belarusian Cup was the 21st season of the Belarusian annual cup competition. Contrary to the league season, it is conducted in a fall-spring rhythm. The first games were played on 14 June 2011. Naftan Novopolotsk of the Cup and qualified for the second qualifying round of the 2012–13 UEFA Europa League.

== Participating clubs ==
The following teams took part in the competition:

2011 Belarusian Premier League all 12 clubs	2011 Belarusian First League all 16 clubs	2011 Belarusian Second League; 15 teams (of 16)	Winners of regional cups 5 teams
BATE Borisov; Shakhtyor Soligorsk; Minsk; Dinamo Minsk; Dinamo Brest; Belshina Bobruisk; Naftan Novopolotsk; Dnepr Mogilev; Vitebsk; Neman Grodno; Torpedo-BelAZ Zhodino; Gomel	Partizan Minsk; SKVICH Minsk; DSK Gomel; Granit Mikashevichi; Rudensk; Baranovichi; Polotsk; Khimik Svetlogorsk; Slavia Mozyr; Volna Pinsk; Smorgon; Belcard Grodno; Vedrich-97 Rechitsa; Gorodeya; Slutsk; Klechesk Kletsk	Kommunalnik Slonim; Lida; Zabudova Molodechno; Zvezda-BGU Minsk; Bereza-2010; Gomelzheldortrans; Osipovichi; Neman Mosty; Vigvam Smolevichi; Beltransgaz Slonim; Zhlobin; Orsha; Vertikal Kalinkovichi; Livadiya Dzerzhinsk; Partizan-2 Minsk	Energetik Novolukoml (Vitebsk Region); Kobrin (Brest Region); Nika Minsk (Minsk); Tsementnik Krasnoselsky (Grodno Region); Zabudova-2007 Chist (Minsk Region)

1. Dinamo Brest was renamed to FC Brest during the winter break.
2. Dinamo-2 Minsk did not participate in this edition of the Cup.

== First round ==
32 teams started the competition in this round: 12 teams from the First League, 15 teams from Second League (all but Dinamo-2 Minsk) and 5 amateur clubs. 4 First League clubs that were at the top of league table at the moment of the draw (Slavia Mozyr, SKVICH Minsk, Partizan Minsk and Vedrich-97 Rechitsa) and all 12 Premier League teams received a bye to the next round. Matches of this round were played on 14, 15 and 16 June 2011.

14 June 2011	Vertikal Kalinkovichi (III)	0–2	Partizan-2 Minsk (III)	Kalinkovichi
18:00			Bakhmatovich 53'; Raslevich 67'	Stadium: Yunost Stadium; Attendance: 300; Referee: Dmitry Abushkevich (Mogilev)

15 June 2011	Zvezda-BGU Minsk (III)	1–2	Rudensk (II)	Minsk
12:00	Buyak 30'		Kazak 10'; Nozdrin-Plotnitsky 60'	Stadium: RCOP-BGU Stadium; Attendance: 200; Referee: Aleksey Obelevskiy (Grodno)

15 June 2011	Vigvam Smolevichi (III)	0–1	Baranovichi (II)	Minsk
15:00			Lepeshko 67'	Stadium: BGATU Stadium; Attendance: 50; Referee: Vitaly Maslovskiy (Minsk)

15 June 2011	Tsementnik Krasnoselsky (A)	0–4	Klechesk Kletsk (II)	Krasnoselsky
17:00			Tsvirko 18'; Davydenko 29'; Lapshin 73'; Klochkov 74'	Stadium: Tsementnik Stadium; Attendance: 500; Referee: Roman Golodko (Brest)

15 June 2011	Osipovichi (III)	1–5	Lida (III)	Osipovichi
18:00	Sosinovsky 53'		Safronaw 25'; Benkevich 37'; Yazevich 40'; Tretyak 58'; Dabravolski 90'	Stadium: Yunost Stadium; Attendance: 450; Referee: Aleksey Martynov (Minsk)

15 June 2011	Energetik Novolukoml (A)	0–6	Smorgon (II)	Novolukoml
18:00			Dovgilevich 24', 40'; Traskevich 31'; Fastaw 33', 37'; Luzhankov 76'	Stadium: Energetik Stadium; Attendance: 300; Referee: Dmitry Dmitriyev (Fanipol)

15 June 2011	Zhlobin (III)	1–3	Khimik Svetlogorsk (II)	Zhlobin
18:00	Zakharanka 90+3'		Sarkisov 36'; Alhavik 65'; Shukelovich 88'	Stadium: Lokomotiv Stadium; Attendance: 300; Referee: Pavel Rudenkov (Gomel)

15 June 2011	Kommunalnik Slonim (III)	0–3	Gorodeya (II)	Slonim
18:00			U. Makowski 58'; Kolyadko 78'; Karolik 80'	Stadium: Yunost Stadium; Attendance: 300; Referee: Antuan Mayorov (Minsk)

15 June 2011	Orsha (III)	0–7	Granit Mikashevichi (II)	Orsha
18:00			Shreitor 11', 54'; Marhulets 45+1'; Filinovich 56'; Butramyev 81', 83'; Kavalyuk 88'	Stadium: City Stadium; Attendance: 550; Referee: Vyacheslav Kolochinsky (Mogilev)

15 June 2011	Nika Minsk (A)	2–9	Polotsk (II)	Minsk
18:00	Shorokh 54'; Vasilevsky 86'		Shcharbakow 27'; Golubev 39'; Filippov 43', 45'; Syrokvashko 59', 62', 84', 89' (pen.); Molchanov 83'	Stadium: RCOP-BGU Stadium; Attendance: 50; Referee: Andrey Divakov (Mogilev)

15 June 2011	Bereza-2010 (III)	0–1	Belcard Grodno (II)	Bereza
18:00			Tulinsky 59'	Stadium: DYuSSh-1 Stadium; Attendance: 250; Referee: Aleksandr Matusevich (Molodechno)

15 June 2011	Zabudova-2007 Chist (A)	0–2	DSK Gomel (II)	Molodechno
18:00			Kurgheli 6'; Zabolotsky 87'	Stadium: City Stadium; Attendance: 100; Referee: Ivan Safaryan (Minsk)

15 June 2011	Gomelzheldortrans (III)	6–0	Livadiya Dzerzhinsk (III)	Gomel
18:30	Trafimaw 19', 29'; Kavalyow 23'; Andriyevsky 44'; Sigay 62'; Lavrenchuk 65'			Stadium: DYuSSh-8 Stadium; Attendance: 340; Referee: Viktor Shimusik (Osipovichi)

15 June 2011	Neman Mosty (III)	0–4	Slutsk (II)	Mosty
19:00			Demenkovets 21' (pen.), 55', 85' (pen.); Leshanyuk 46'	Stadium: Neman Stadium; Attendance: 100; Referee: Nikita Pyreyev (Minsk)

15 June 2011	Kobrin (A)	2–9	Volna Pinsk (II)	Kobrin
19:00	Brishtel 59', 81' (pen.)		Shkuratenko 33'; Korolyuk 39', 54', 63', 71'; Naperkovsky 61' (pen.); Kudey 84', 87'; Vakulich 90+1'	Stadium: Yunost Stadium; Attendance: 1200; Referee: Gennady Levchuk (Malorita)

16 June 2011	Beltransgaz Slonim (III)	3–1	Zabudova Molodechno (III)	Slonim
18:00	Lavoshik 37'; Shablinsky 60'; Gomza 90'		Makritsky 26'	Stadium: Yunost Stadium; Attendance: 700; Referee: Yevgeni Moroz (Minsk)

== Round of 32 ==
The winners from the First Round will play against 16 clubs that received a bye to this round. The draw was conducted on 17 June 2011. Matches of this round were played on 29 June 2011. Due to scheduling conflicts with qualifying rounds of UEFA Champions League and Europa League, games involving BATE Borisov, Minsk and Shakhtyor Soligorsk were rescheduled to 22 July, 17 August and 6 September 2011 respectively.

29 June 2011	DSK Gomel (II)	0–0 (a.e.t.) (3–4 p)	SKVICH Minsk (II)	Gomel
14:00				Stadium: DYuSSh-8 Stadium; Attendance: 200; Referee: Andrey Soroka (Smolevichi)
	Penalties
	Kuklevsky (penalty scored); Arkhiptsev (penalty scored); Lyubaev (penalty missed); Grishchenko (penalty scored); Dashuk (penalty missed)		(penalty scored) Golovnyov; (penalty scored) Lekhavitsky; (penalty scored) Zhdanok; (penalty scored) Kalechits

29 June 2011	Polotsk (II)	0–5	Gomel	Polotsk
17:00			Platonov 4'; Lyasyuk 22'; Kantsavy 55', 90+2'; Kashewski 81'	Stadium: Spartak Stadium; Attendance: 100; Referee: Vadim Panchenko (Mogilev)

29 June 2011	Baranovichi (II)	2–3	Partizan Minsk (II)	Baranovichi
18:00	Lepeshko 27'; Mikhaltsov 35'		Hancharyk 4'; Karp 55'; Gornak 83'	Stadium: Lokomotiv Stadium; Attendance: 350; Referee: Oleg Murashkevich (Novopolotsk)

29 June 2011	Rudensk (II)	2–1	Torpedo-BelAZ Zhodino	Maryina Horka
18:00	Khodnevich 24'; Sholudko 31'		Salavey 70'	Stadium: City Stadium; Attendance: 700; Referee: Vladimir Ischenko (Rechytsa)

29 June 2011	Klechesk Kletsk (II)	1–1 (a.e.t.) (8–7 p)	Dnepr Mogilev	Nesvizh
18:00	Viskushenko 28'		Shepelew 41'	Stadium: Urozhai Stadium; Attendance: 500; Referee: Dmitry Yevnevich (Minsk)
	Penalties
	Ustyan (penalty scored); Vasilyonok (penalty scored); Selyava (penalty missed); Lapshin (penalty scored); Mytnik (penalty scored); Viskushenko (penalty scored); Davydenko (penalty scored); Gurko (penalty scored); Shumeyko (penalty scored)		(penalty scored) Obrazaw; (penalty missed) Kazlow; (penalty scored) Zyankovich; (penalty scored) Matsveenka; (penalty scored) Shupikov; (penalty scored) Shramchenko; (penalty scored) Barabanov; (penalty scored) Shepelew; (penalty missed) Silagailis

29 June 2011	Lida (III)	3–2	Slavia Mozyr (II)	Lida
18:00	Yazevich 33'; Khodyko 45'; Matyuk 85'		Martsinovich 47'; Volkov 88'	Stadium: Yunost Stadium; Attendance: 800; Referee: Gennady Levchuk (Malaryta)

29 June 2011	Slutsk (II)	1–2 (a.e.t.)	Dinamo Minsk	Soligorsk
18:00	Hryharaw 68'		Ledesma 7'; Kuhan 107'	Stadium: Shakhtyor Stadium; Attendance: 600; Referee: Oleg Cherepnyov (Bobruisk)

29 June 2011	Smorgon (II)	0–2	Neman Grodno	Smorgon
18:00			Kavalyonak 27'; Savitskiy 36'	Stadium: Yunost Stadium; Attendance: 600; Referee: Yury Fomin (Volkovysk)

29 June 2011	Belcard Grodno (II)	2–0 (a.e.t.)	Vitebsk	Grodno
18:00	Golovnitsky 92'; Tulinsky 97'			Stadium: Neman Stadium; Attendance: 400; Referee: Viktor Verbitsky (Kobrin)

29 June 2011	Granit Mikashevichi (II)	0–3	Dinamo Brest	Luninets
18:00			Mazalewski 15'; Lebedzew 41'; Khvashchynski 65'	Stadium: Polesye Stadium; Attendance: 400; Referee: Sergey Tsinkevich (Osipovichi)

29 June 2011	Beltransgaz Slonim (III)	2–4	Naftan Novopolotsk	Slonim
18:00	Kevra 6'; German 34'		Verkhovtsov 15', 80'; Khlebosolov 29'; Strypeykis 68'	Stadium: Yunost Stadium; Attendance: 800; Referee: Ivan Safaryan (Minsk)

29 June 2011	Volna Pinsk (II)	1–3	Vedrich-97 Rechitsa (II)	Pinsk
19:00	Shkuratenko 38'		Hintaw 65'; Barsukow 82', 90+3'	Stadium: Volna Stadium; Attendance: 1,100; Referee: Vladimir Serko (Grodno)

29 June 2011	Gomelzheldortrans (III)	1–5	Belshina Bobruisk	Gomel
19:30	Kovalev 87'		Zubovich 3', 18'; Horbanenko 44'; Prakapenka 73'; Lisovyi 90+1' (pen.)	Stadium: DYuSSh-8 Stadium; Attendance: 350; Referee: Nikita Pyreyev (Minsk)

22 July 2011	Gorodeya (II)	0–7	BATE Borisov	Gorodeya
18:00			Rudzik 8'; Rodionov 12', 22', 24'; Skavysh 57', 80'; Aleksiyan 65'	Stadium: Gorodeya Stadium; Attendance: 1,600; Referee: Oleg Murashkevich (Novopolotsk)

17 August 2011	Partizan-2 Minsk (III)	2–4	Minsk	Minsk
18:00	Dubovik 16', 41'		Razin 13', 84'; Klimovich 22'; Vasilyuk 29' (pen.)	Stadium: Torpedo Stadium; Attendance: 450; Referee: Antuan Mayorov (Minsk)

6 September 2011	Khimik Svetlogorsk (II)	0–6	Shakhtyor Soligorsk	Svetlogorsk
17:00			Komarovski 14', 27'; Grenkow 19'; Alumona 51', 54', 57'	Stadium: Bumazhnik Stadium; Attendance: 1,100; Referee: Aleksey Martynov (Minsk)

== Round of 16 ==
The draw was conducted on 28 July 2011. The games were played on 21 September and 13 November 2011.

21 September 2011	Belcard Grodno (II)	1–2	SKVICH Minsk (II)	Grodno
12:00	Vyarstak 64' (pen.)		Shakaw 71'; Mikhnavets 88'	Stadium: Neman Stadium; Attendance: 200; Referee: Gennady Levchuk (Malaryta)

21 September 2011	Naftan Novopolotsk	2–1	Partizan Minsk (II)	Novopolotsk
16:00	Khlebosolov 15'; Hawrushka 23'		Camara 1'	Stadium: Atlant Stadium; Attendance: 1,300; Referee: Yury Fomin (Volkovysk)

21 September 2011	Vedrich-97 Rechitsa (II)	1–2	Lida (III)	Rechytsa
16:30	Byahanski 79'		Denisyuk 27', 87'	Stadium: Central Stadium; Attendance: 700; Referee: Sergey Tsinkevich (Osipovichi)

21 September 2011	Rudensk (II)	1–3	Klechesk Kletsk (II)	Maryina Horka
16:30	Nozdrin-Plotnitsky 20'		Lapshin 58', 62'; Davydenko 90+1'	Stadium: City Stadium; Attendance: 100; Referee: Dmitry Yevnevich (Minsk)

21 September 2011	Neman Grodno	2–1	Dinamo Minsk	Grodno
19:00	Lebedzew 61' (pen.); Dzenisevich 84'		Ledesma 67'	Stadium: Neman Stadium; Attendance: 2,500; Referee: Vadim Panchenko (Mogilev)

21 September 2011	Shakhtyor Soligorsk	0–0 (a.e.t.) (4–5 p)	Gomel	Soligorsk
19:00				Stadium: Stroitel Stadium; Attendance: 1,550; Referee: Sergey Sakharevich (Grodno)
	Penalties
	Sokol (penalty scored); Khachaturyan (penalty scored); Kolomyts (penalty missed); Pyatrow (penalty scored); Kamarowski (penalty scored)		(penalty scored) Lyavitski; (penalty scored) Kashewski; (penalty scored) Yawseenka; (penalty scored) Kazeka; (penalty scored) Stasevich

13 November 2011	Dinamo Brest	3–1	BATE Borisov	Brest
14:00	Tsevan 13'; Yanush 33'; Klopotskiy 88'		Kontsevoy 7'	Stadium: OSK Brestskiy; Attendance: 1,870; Referee: Sergey Sakharevich (Grodno)

13 November 2011	Minsk	3–0	Belshina Bobruisk	Minsk
14:00	Razin 1'; Klimovich 31'; Voronkov 62'			Stadium: Torpedo Stadium; Attendance: 400; Referee: Gennady Levchuk (Malaryta)

== Quarterfinals ==
An open draw for quarterfinals was conducted on 21 November 2011.

Match between Lida and Naftan was moved from Lida to Grodno due to bad pitch conditions in March. Match between Klechesk and Neman was moved from Kletsk to the opponent's stadium in Grodno for similar reasons.

17 March 2012	Lida (II)	1–2	Naftan Novopolotsk	Grodno
12:00	Dabravolski 23' (pen.)		Shkabara 9'; Bukatkin 33'	Stadium: Neman Stadium; Attendance: 900; Referee: Oleg Cherepnyov (Bobruisk)

17 March 2012	Brest	1–2	Gomel	Brest
14:00	Gogoladze 77'		Sherakow 60'; Nowak 67'	Stadium: Dinamo Stadium; Attendance: 2,500; Referee: Dmitry Yevnevich (Minsk)

17 March 2012	Neman Grodno	6–0	Klechesk Kletsk (II)	Grodno
15:30	Veselinov 6', 33'; Savitskiy 28'; Dzenisevich 59' (pen.); Vitus 65'; Bombel 82'			Stadium: Neman Stadium; Attendance: 2,000; Referee: Vadim Panchenko (Mogilev)

18 March 2012	SKVICH Minsk (II)	2–3	Minsk	Minsk
15:00	Markhel 11'; Volodko 69'		Vasilyuk 45+2' (pen.); Makas 50'; Razin 90+3'	Stadium: Football Manege; Attendance: 800; Referee: Valery Vyalichka (Minsk)

== Semifinals ==
The draw for semifinals was held on March 19 and was an open draw.

25 April 2012	Naftan Novopolotsk	0–0 (a.e.t.) (3–1 p)	Gomel	Novopolotsk
16:00				Stadium: Atlant Stadium; Attendance: 300; Referee: Dmitry Yevnevich (Minsk)
	Penalties
	Shkabara (penalty scored); Kovalenko (penalty scored); Zhukowski (penalty scored)		(penalty missed) Lyavitski; (penalty missed) Nowak; (penalty scored) Kashewski; (penalty missed) Platonaw

25 April 2012	Neman Grodno	0–2	Minsk	Grodno
18:30			Kovel 40'; Rozhok 77'	Stadium: Neman Stadium; Attendance: 2,500; Referee: Sergey Tsinkevich (Osipovichi)

== Final ==
20 May 2012
13:30 UTC+3

Minsk	2–2 (a.e.t.)	Naftan Novopolotsk
Vasilyuk 52'; Kovel 76'	Report	Shkabara 27'; Cernych 58'
Penalties
Kowb (penalty scored); Vasilyuk (penalty missed); Makas (penalty missed); Sachywka (penalty scored); Rakhmanaw (penalty scored)	3–4	(penalty scored) Shkabara; (penalty scored) Kovalenko; (penalty missed) Zhukowski; (penalty scored) Harbachow; (penalty scored) Hawrylovich

Dinamo Stadium, Minsk
Attendance: 9,800
Referee: Sergey Tsinkevich (Osipovichi)

MINSK:
GK	1	(Belarus) Artur Lesko	(yellow card) 26'
RB	8	(Belarus) Syarhey Hihevich		(substituted off) 73'
CB	26	(Ukraine) Oleh Karamushka
CB	21	(Belarus) Artsyom Rakhmanaw
LB	2	(Belarus) Roman Begunov	(yellow card) 51'	(substituted off) 61'
RM	5	(Belarus) Yury Astravukh	(yellow card) 62'
CM	11	(Belarus) Alyaksandr Sachywka
CM	20	(Belarus) Ivan Maewski
LM	6	(Belarus) Andrey Razin (c)		(substituted off) 64'
RF	30	(Belarus) Leonid Kovel
LF	10	(Belarus) Raman Vasilyuk
Substitutes:
GK	24	(Belarus) Ihar Logvinaw
MF	7	(Lithuania) Nerijus Valskis
MF	9	(Belarus) Sergey Pushnyakov
FW	12	(Belarus) Alyaksandr Makas		(substituted on) 64'
MF	13	(Lithuania) Marius Činikas		(substituted on) 61'
MF	25	(Senegal) Aboubacar Camara
FW	99	(Belarus) Dzmitry Kowb		(substituted on) 73'
Manager:
(Belarus) Vadim Skripchenko

NAFTAN:
GK	1	(Belarus) Mikalay Ramanyuk
RB	4	(Belarus) Mihail Harbachow
CB	10	(Belarus) Oleg Shkabara
CB	6	(Belarus) Alyaksey Hawrylovich
LB	44	(Belarus) Dzyanis Obrazaw
DM	2	(Belarus) Alyaksandr Kobets
DM	8	(Belarus) Mikita Bukatkin (c)	(yellow card) 79'
RM	13	(Lithuania) Fiodor Cernych
CM	7	(Belarus) Ihar Truhaw		(substituted off) 81'
LM	37	(Russia) Roman Sorokin		(substituted off) 67'
FW	9	(Belarus) Yahor Zubovich		(substituted off) 77'
Substitutes:
GK	16	(Belarus) Igor Dovgyallo
MF	5	(Belarus) Valery Zhukowski		(substituted on) 81'
DF	15	(Belarus) Nikita Naumov
MF	17	(Belarus) Andrey Yakimov
DF	20	(Belarus) Artem Teplov		(substituted on) 67'
FW	22	(Belarus) Alyaksandr Hawrushka
FW	29	(Ukraine) Serhiy Kovalenko		(substituted on) 77'
Manager:
(Belarus) Igor Kovalevich (red card) 28'

== See also ==
- 2011 Belarusian Premier League
- 2012 Belarusian Premier League
- 2011 Belarusian First League
