= 2012 Belarusian First League =

Belarusian First League
- Season: 2012
- Champions: Dnepr Mogilev
- Promoted: Dnepr Mogilev
- Relegated: Rudensk
- Matches: 208
- Goals: 573 (2.75 per match)
- Top goalscorer: Yuri Markhel (29)
- Biggest home win: SKVICH 7–0 DSK; SKVICH 7–0 Polotsk
- Biggest away win: Rudensk 0–8 Slutsk
- Highest scoring: Bereza-2010 8–2 Volna

The 2012 Belarusian First League is the 22nd season of 2nd level football in Belarus. It started in April and finished in November 2012.

== Team changes from 2011 season ==
The winners of last season (Slavia Mozyr) were promoted to Belarusian Premier League. They were replaced by last-placed team of 2011 Belarusian Premier League table (Dnepr Mogilev).

The runners-up of last season (Partizan Minsk) won the promotion/relegation play-off against Vitebsk (11th-placed Premier League team). Partizan Minsk were thus promoted to Premier League and replaced in the First League by Vitebsk.

Two teams that finished at the bottom of 2011 season table (Belcard Grodno and Baranovichi) relegated to the Second League. They were replaced by two best teams of 2011 Second League (Bereza-2010 and Lida).

Klechesk Kletsk withdrew from the league due to lack of financing and joined Second League. No team was invited to replace them and the league was reduced to 15 teams for the season.

== Teams and venues ==
Location of teams in 2012 Belarusian First League

Team	Location	Position in 2011
Vitebsk	Vitebsk	Premier League, 11
Dnepr	Mogilev	Premier League, 12
Gorodeya	Gorodeya	3
SKVICH	Minsk	4
Slutsk	Slutsk	5
Vedrich-97	Rechitsa	6
Volna	Pinsk	7
Granit	Mikashevichi	8
Polotsk	Polotsk	10
Smorgon	Smorgon	11
DSK	Gomel	12
Rudensk	Rudensk	13
Khimik	Svetlogorsk	14
Lida	Lida	Second League, 1
Bereza-2010	Bereza	Second League, 2

== League table ==
Pos	Team	Pld	W	D	L	GF	GA	GD	Pts	Promotion or relegation
1	Dnepr Mogilev (P)	28	20	3	5	75	22	+53	63	Promotion to Belarusian Premier League
2	Gorodeya	28	18	6	4	49	21	+28	60	Qualification for promotion play-off
3	Vitebsk	28	19	2	7	57	30	+27	59	
4	SKVICH Minsk	28	16	7	5	61	19	+42	55	
5	Slutsk	28	15	7	6	59	27	+32	52	
6	Granit Mikashevichi	28	14	8	6	41	23	+18	50	
7	Vedrich-97 Rechitsa	28	9	12	7	40	24	+16	39	
8	Volna Pinsk	28	8	10	10	24	45	−21	34	
9	Bereza-2010	28	9	6	13	41	48	−7	33	
10	Smorgon	28	7	10	11	23	32	−9	31	
11	Lida	28	8	6	14	32	49	−17	30	
12	Polotsk	28	7	5	16	24	55	−31	26	
13	Khimik Svetlogorsk	28	5	9	14	29	52	−23	24	
14	DSK Gomel (R)	28	1	5	22	9	62	−53	8	Disbanded
15	Rudensk (Note: Rudensk were deducted 9 points due to significant delays in players' payments.) (R)	28	4	4	20	15	70	−55	7	Disbanded

Source: football.by
Rules for classification: 1st points; 2nd matches won; 3rd head-to-head (points, matches won, goal difference, goals scored); 4th goal difference; 5th goals scored
(P) Promoted; (R) Relegated

=== Promotion play-offs ===
The 11th placed team of 2012 Premier League (Torpedo-BelAZ Zhodino) played a two-legged relegation play-off against the runners-up of 2012 Belarusian First League Gorodeya for one spot in the 2013 Premier League and won the series 4–1 on aggregate.

== Results ==
Home \ Away	BER	DNE	DSK	GRD	GRA	KHI	LID	POL	RUD	SKV	SLU	SMR	V97	VIT	VOL
Bereza-2010		2–1	1–0	2–1	1–0	3–3	3–0	0–0	4–1	1–1	1–2	1–1	1–1	1–2	8–2
Dnepr Mogilev	3–2		4–0	3–1	2–0	6–1	0–0	5–0	5–0	1–0	3–1	3–0	2–1	6–0	4–0
DSK Gomel	0–0	0–3		0–4	1–1	1–3	1–3	0–1	2–0	0–3	1–3	0–4	0–0	0–1	0–2
Gorodeya	2–1	3–2	2–0		1–1	2–1	2–0	1–0	3–0	1–0	3–1	1–0	0–0	2–0	4–0
Granit Mikashevichi	4–0	1–0	2–0	0–0		1–1	2–1	2–1	2–2	0–1	4–1	0–0	2–1	1–0	0–1
Khimik Svetlogorsk	2–1	2–3	2–2	0–0	1–2		0–2	2–3	0–2	0–2	0–3	1–1	0–0	1–2	2–2
Lida	1–3	2–6	1–0	1–2	0–1	2–2		1–1	1–0	1–1	0–1	3–0	1–1	0–5	4–0
Polotsk	4–1	0–3	1–0	0–2	2–1	2–0	0–1		0–1	1–3	1–2	0–0	0–5	1–4	1–1
Rudensk	0–1	0–3	2–1	0–5	0–5	1–1	0–4	1–2		2–2	0–8	1–0	0–6	0–1	0–3
SKVICH Minsk	7–1	2–1	7–0	1–1	2–2	2–0	3–0 (Note: Awarded to SKVICH as Lida did not show up for the game.)	7–0	2–1		0–0	5–0	0–1	1–0	0–0
Slutsk	4–0	2–2	6–0	1–1	2–0	2–0	5–0	4–0	1–0	0–2		1–0	2–2	0–1	1–1
Smorgon	1–0	2–1	2–0	0–1	1–3	0–1	2–2	1–0	1–0	1–2	1–1		1–1	2–1	0–0
Vedrich-97 Rechitsa	1–0	0–1	0–0	0–1	0–0	0–2	5–1	3–0	2–1	3–0	3–1	2–2		0–3	1–1
Vitebsk	2–1	0–0	2–0	6–3	1–2	5–0	2–0	4–3	5–0	1–0	0–3	0–0	2–1		4–1
Volna Pinsk	2–1	0–2	3–0 (Note: Awarded to Volna as DSK did not show up for the game.)	1–0	0–3	0–1	1–0	0–0	0–0	0–5	1–1	1–0	0–0	1–3	

Source: football.by
Legend: Blue = home team win; Yellow = draw; Red = away team win.

== Top goalscorers ==
Rank	Goalscorer	Team	Goals
1	(Belarus) Yuri Markhel	SKVICH Minsk	29
2	(Belarus) Dmitry Gomza	Vitebsk	16
3	(Belarus) Anton Matsveenka	Dnepr Mogilev	14
4	(Latvia) Igors Sļesarčuks	Dnepr Mogilev	12
5	(Belarus) Uladzimir Shakaw	Dnepr Mogilev / Gorodeya	11
5	(Belarus) Mikalay Zyanko	Dnepr Mogilev	11
5	(Belarus) Sergey Gerasimenko	Bereza-2010	11
8	(Belarus) Ihar Makaraw	Slutsk	10
8	(Belarus) Vladimir Yurchenko	Dnepr Mogilev	10
8	(Belarus) Alyaksandr Dzegtseraw	Vitebsk	10

Updated to games played on 17 November 2012
Source: football.by

== See also ==
- 2012 Belarusian Premier League
- 2011–12 Belarusian Cup
- 2012–13 Belarusian Cup
