= 2011 Belarusian First League =

Belarusian First League
- Season: 2011
- Champions: Slavia Mozyr
- Promoted: Slavia Mozyr
- Relegated: Belcard Grodno; Baranovichi
- Matches: 236
- Goals: 620 (2.63 per match)
- Top goalscorer: Yuri Korolyuk (21)
- Biggest home win: Khimik 6–0 Baranovichi; SKVICH 6–0 Smorgon; SKVICH 6–0 Baranovichi
- Biggest away win: Polotsk 0–5 Partizan; Baranovichi 0–5 Gorodeya; Belcard 0–5 Polotsk
- Highest scoring: Slutsk 7–3 Khimik

The 2011 Belarusian First League is the 21st season of 2nd level football in Belarus. It started on April 23 and will end in November 2011.

== Team changes from 2010 season ==
The winners of last season (Gomel) were promoted to Belarusian Premier League. They were replaced by last-placed team of 2010 Belarusian Premier League table (Partizan Minsk).

The runners-up of last season (SKVICH Minsk) lost the promotion/relegation play-off to Torpedo Zhodino (11th-placed Premier League team) and both clubs stayed in their respective leagues.

Two teams that finished at the bottom of 2010 season table (Kommunalnik Slonim and Lida) relegated to the Second League. They were replaced by two best teams of 2010 Second League (Gorodeya and Slutsksakhar Slutsk).

Veras Nesvizh withdrew from the league and disbanded due to lack of financing. They were replaced by Klechesk Kletsk, who finished 3rd in last year's Second League.

Slutsksakhar Slutsk changed their name to FC Slutsk prior to the season.

== Teams and venues ==
Location of teams in 2011 Belarusian First League

Team	Location	Position in 2010
Partizan	Minsk	Premier League, 12
SKVICH	Minsk	2
DSK	Gomel	3
Granit	Mikashevichi	4
Rudensk	Rudensk	5
Baranovichi	Baranovichi	6
Polotsk	Polotsk	7
Khimik	Svetlogorsk	8
Slavia	Mozyr	9
Volna	Pinsk	10
Smorgon	Smorgon	12
Belcard	Grodno	13
Vedrich-97	Rechitsa	14
Gorodeya	Gorodeya	Second League, 1
Slutsk	Slutsk	Second League, 2
Klechesk	Kletsk	Second League, 3

== League table ==
Pos	Team	Pld	W	D	L	GF	GA	GD	Pts	Promotion or relegation
1	Slavia Mozyr (P)	30	22	5	3	53	17	+36	71	Promotion to Belarusian Premier League
2	Partizan Minsk (P)	30	20	5	5	59	26	+33	65	Qualification for promotion play-off
3	Gorodeya	30	16	7	7	51	31	+20	55	
4	SKVICH Minsk	30	16	6	8	57	27	+30	54	
5	Slutsk	30	13	10	7	44	33	+11	49	
6	Vedrich-97 Rechitsa	30	13	7	10	40	34	+6	46	
7	Volna Pinsk	30	13	6	11	52	38	+14	45	
8	Granit Mikashevichi	30	11	10	9	38	35	+3	43	
9	Klechesk Kletsk (Note: Klechesk were denied First League licence for 2012 due to financial troubles.) (R)	30	12	5	13	45	42	+3	41	Relegation to Belarusian Second League
10	Polotsk	30	9	8	13	36	39	−3	35	
11	Smorgon	30	9	7	14	32	45	−13	34	
12	DSK Gomel	30	8	10	12	28	34	−6	34	
13	Rudensk	30	9	6	15	25	40	−15	33	
14	Khimik Svetlogorsk	30	10	2	18	32	48	−16	32	
15	Belcard Grodno (R)	30	8	5	17	30	55	−25	29	Relegation to Belarusian Second League
16	Baranovichi (R)	30	0	3	27	10	90	−80	3	Relegation to Belarusian Second League

Source: football.by
Rules for classification: 1st points; 2nd matches won; 3rd head-to-head (points, matches won, goal difference, goals scored); 4th goal difference; 5th goals scored
(P) Promoted; (R) Relegated

=== Promotion play-offs ===
The runners-up of 2011 Belarusian First League Partizan Minsk played a two-legged promotion play-off against the 11th placed team of 2011 Premier League (Vitebsk) for one spot in the 2012 Premier League and won the series 3–2. As a result, Vitebsk were relegated to the First League and Partizan promoted to Premier League. Partizan, however, were unable to start the next season due to bankruptcy and were disbanded.

== Results ==
Home \ Away	BAR	BCR	DSK	GRD	GRA	KHI	KLE	PAR	POL	RUD	SKV	SLA	SLU	SMR	V97	VOL
Baranovichi		1–1	1–3	0–5	1–1	0–2	1–2	0–3	1–2	0–3	0–1	0–2	0–0	1–2	1–3	1–5
Belcard Grodno	2–0		2–0	0–1	1–1	0–1	1–3	0–2	0–5	2–0	0–4	0–2	2–3	1–0	1–2	4–3
DSK Gomel	5–0	0–2		1–2	1–2	1–1	1–0	1–1	1–1	2–3	0–1	0–3	0–0	0–2	1–0	3–3
Gorodeya	2–1	4–1	1–1		2–0	2–1	3–0	0–3	3–0 (Note: Awarded to Gorodeya as Polotsk did not show up for the game.)	2–0	1–1	0–1	0–1	2–0	2–3	4–2
Granit Mikashevichi	3–0 (Note: Awarded to Granit as Baranovichi did not show up for the game.)	4–1	0–0	3–2		1–0	4–1	1–1	0–2	0–0	0–0	1–2	1–1	1–0	1–2	0–1
Khimik Svetlogorsk	6–0	1–0	0–1	0–1	2–5		3–1	0–1	1–0	2–0	1–0	1–2	1–2	1–1	3–0 (Note: Awarded to Khimik as Vedrich-97 did not show up for the game.)	0–3
Klechesk Kletsk	5–0	3–0	1–2	2–0	2–3	3–0		0–0	2–1	0–0	0–3	1–2	1–3	4–0	0–2	0–0
Partizan Minsk	3–1	4–0	2–0	3–0	2–0	4–1	4–1		3–2	0–1	3–2	2–1	2–1	2–4	1–2	2–0
Polotsk	2–0	1–1	0–0	1–1	0–1	1–0	1–2	0–5		3–0 (Note: Awarded to Polotsk as Rudensk did not show up for the game.)	0–0	0–0	1–1	4–0	2–1	3–1
Rudensk	1–0	0–2	1–0	1–1	2–0	0–1	0–1	0–1	2–0		2–3	1–2	1–0	1–1	1–3	3–1
SKVICH Minsk	6–0	1–3	0–1	2–3	1–2	3–0	1–1	0–1	3–1	4–0		2–1	1–2	6–0	1–1	2–1
Slavia Mozyr	3–0	2–0	2–0	1–1	3–0	3–0	1–0	3–1	1–0	3–0	2–2		3–0	0–1	0–0	1–0
Slutsk	3–0	1–1	1–1	1–1	1–1	7–3	4–2	3–0	1–0	1–1	0–1	1–2		2–1	1–0	1–3
Smorgon	5–0	3–1	0–1	0–0	3–1	1–0	0–2	1–1	1–1	2–1	0–2	0–2	0–0		0–1	1–2
Vedrich-97 Rechitsa	4–0	1–1	0–0	1–2	1–1	1–0	0–3	1–1	4–1	0–0	1–2	1–3	1–2	3–1		1–0
Volna Pinsk	5–0	2–0	2–1	0–3	0–0	4–0	2–2	0–1	3–1	3–0	0–2	0–0	2–0	2–2	2–0	

Source: football.by
Legend: Blue = home team win; Yellow = draw; Red = away team win.

== Top goalscorers ==
Rank	Goalscorer	Team	Goals
1	(Belarus) Yuri Korolyuk	Volna Pinsk	21
2	(Belarus) Alyaksandr Makas	Partizan Minsk	19
3	(Belarus) Uladzimir Shakaw	SKVICH Minsk	16
3	(Belarus) Ruslan Shukelovich	Khimik Svetlogorsk	16
5	(Belarus) Dmitry Verstak	Belcard Grodno	14
6	(Belarus) Yuri Markhel	SKVICH Minsk	13
6	(Belarus) Pavel Byahanski	Vedrich-97 Rechitsa	13

Updated to games played on 19 November 2011
Source: football.by

== See also ==
- 2011 Belarusian Premier League
- 2010–11 Belarusian Cup
- 2011–12 Belarusian Cup
