= Aleksandr Karnitsky =

Belarusian footballer

Aleksandr Karnitsky Аляксандр Карніцкі
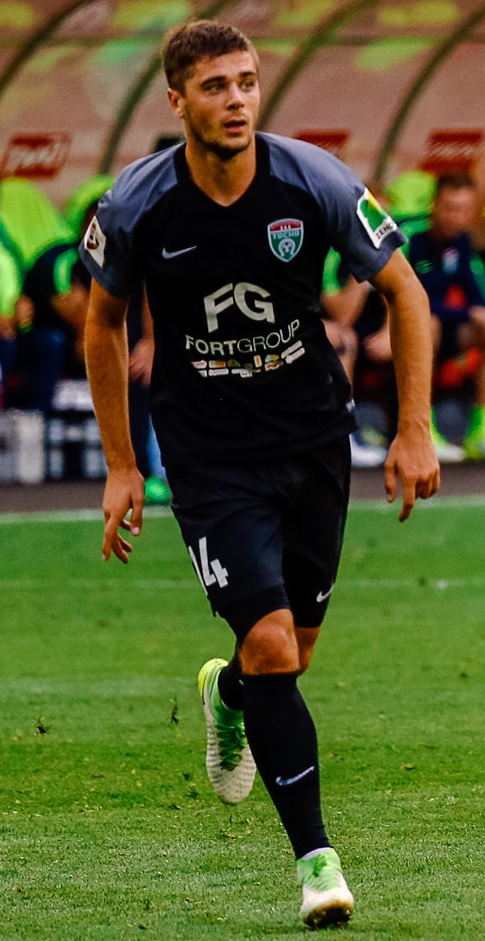
- Karnitsky with Tosno in 2017

Personal information
- Full name: Aleksandr Ivanovich Karnitsky
- Date of birth: 14 February 1989 (age 37)
- Place of birth: Stolbtsy, Belarusian SSR
- Height: 1.87 m (6 ft 1 1/2 in)
- Position: Midfielder

Team information
- Current team: Diósgyőr II
- Number: 14

Senior career*
Years	Team	Apps	(Gls)
2009–2010	Baranovichi	25	(2)
2011	Polotsk	26	(2)
2012	Granit Mikashevichi	27	(4)
2013	Gomel	31	(4)
2014–2016	BATE Borisov	66	(11)
2016–2017	Hapoel Ra'anana	14	(0)
2017	Gomel	11	(4)
2017–2018	Tosno	23	(0)
2018–2019	Sepsi OSK	24	(1)
2019–2024	Mezőkövesd	116	(7)
2024–	Diósgyőr II		

International career
2017–2018	Belarus	7	(0)
- * Club domestic league appearances and goals as of 31 May 2024

Aleksandr Ivanovich Karnitsky (Belarusian: Аляксандр Іванавіч Карніцкі; Russian: Александр Иванович Карницкий; born 14 February 1989) is a Belarusian professional footballer who plays for Hungarian side Diósgyőr II. His positions are central midfielder and defensive midfielder.

== Club career ==
He came off the bench as FC Tosno won the 2017–18 Russian Cup final against FC Avangard Kursk on 9 May 2018 in the Volgograd Arena.

== Career statistics ==
As of 13 May 2018

Club	Season	League			Cup		Continental		Other		Total	
Club	Season	Division	Apps	Goals	Apps	Goals	Apps	Goals	Apps	Goals	Apps	Goals
Baranovichi	2009	Pershaya Liga	11	1	0	0	–		–		11	1
Baranovichi	2010	Pershaya Liga	24	1	1	0	–		–		25	1
Baranovichi	Total		35	2	1	0	0	0	0	0	36	2
Polotsk	2011	Pershaya Liga	26	2	1	0	–		–		27	2
Granit Mikashevichi	2012	Pershaya Liga	27	4	1	0	–		–		28	4
Gomel	2013	Vysheyshaya Liga	31	4	3	0	–		–		34	4
BATE Borisov	2014	Vysheyshaya Liga	27	7	2	0	10	1	1 (Note: One appearance in Belarusian Super Cup)	0	40	8
BATE Borisov	2015	Vysheyshaya Liga	24	3	6	3	9	1	1 (Note: One appearance in Belarusian Super Cup)	0	40	7
BATE Borisov	2016	Vysheyshaya Liga	15	1	4	0	5	1	1 (Note: One appearance in Belarusian Super Cup)	0	25	2
BATE Borisov	Total		66	11	12	3	24	3	3	0	105	17
Hapoel Ra'anana	2016–17	Israeli Premier League	14	0	0	0	–		–		14	0
Gomel	2017	Vysheyshaya Liga	11	4	0	0	–		–		11	4
Gomel	Total (2 spells)		42	8	3	0	0	0	0	0	45	8
Tosno	2017–18	Premier Liga	23	0	3	0	–		–		26	0
Career total			233	27	21	3	24	3	3	0	281	33

== Personal life ==
His younger brother Valery Karnitsky is also a professional footballer, who is currently playing for Smolevichi-STI.

== Honours ==
BATE Borisov

- Belarusian Premier League champion: 2014, 2015, 2016
- Belarusian Cup winner: 2014–15
- Belarusian Super Cup winner: 2014, 2015, 2016

Tosno

- Russian Cup: 2017–18
