= 2010 Belarusian First League =

Belarusian First League
- Season: 2010
- Champions: Gomel
- Promoted: Gomel
- Relegated: Kommunalnik Slonim; Lida
- Matches: 240
- Goals: 607 (2.53 per match)
- Top goalscorer: Yuri Markhel (28)
- Biggest home win: Granit 7–0 Baranovichi
- Biggest away win: Kommunalnik 0–4 Polotsk; Slavia Mozyr 0–4 Smorgon; Volna 0–4 Granit; Polotsk 0–4 Gomel; Khimik 1–5 SKVICH
- Highest scoring: Lida 2–5 DSK; Gomel 5–2 Veras; Rudensk 2–5 Gomel; Granit 3–4 Slavia Mozyr; Granit 7–0 Baranovichi

The 2010 Belarusian First League is the 20th season of 2nd level football in Belarus. It started on April 17 and ended on November 13, 2010.

== Team changes from 2009 season ==
The winners of last season (Belshina Bobruisk) were promoted to Belarusian Premier League. Due to reduction of Premier League, the promoted team was replaced by three teams that finished at the bottom of 2009 Belarusian Premier League table (Gomel, Granit Mikashevichi and Smorgon). The First League was expanded from 14 to 16 teams.

One team that finished at the bottom of 2009 season table (Spartak Shklov) relegated to the Second League. They were replaced by one best team of 2009 Second League (Rudensk).

== Teams and venues ==
Location of teams in 2010 Belarusian First League

Team	Location	Position in 2009
Gomel	Gomel	Premier league, 12
Granit	Mikashevichi	Premier league, 13
Smorgon	Smorgon	Premier league, 14
Volna	Pinsk	2
DSK	Gomel	3
Veras	Nesvizh	4
SKVICH	Minsk	5
Baranovichi	Baranovichi	6
Khimik	Svetlogorsk	7
Vedrich-97	Rechitsa	8
Belcard	Grodno	9
Kommunalnik	Slonim	10
Lida	Lida	11
Polotsk	Polotsk	12
Slavia	Mozyr	13
Rudensk	Maryina Gorka	Second league, 1

== League table ==
Pos	Team	Pld	W	D	L	GF	GA	GD	Pts	Promotion or relegation
1	Gomel (P)	30	27	1	2	80	16	+64	82	Promotion to Belarusian Premier League
2	SKVICH Minsk	30	17	7	6	52	21	+31	58 (Note: SKVICH Minsk advanced over DSK Gomel by better head-to-head record (3–0, 0–1).)	Qualification for promotion play-off
3	DSK Gomel	30	17	7	6	52	26	+26	58	
4	Granit Mikashevichi	30	16	8	6	52	23	+29	56	
5	Rudensk	30	12	7	11	37	39	−2	43	
6	Baranovichi	30	11	10	9	31	37	−6	43	
7	Polotsk	30	9	12	9	38	34	+4	39	
8	Khimik Svetlogorsk	30	10	7	13	37	44	−7	37 (Note: Khimik Svetlogorsk advanced over Slavia Mozyr by better head-to-head away goals record (1–0 at home, 1–2 away).)	
9	Slavia Mozyr	30	10	7	13	33	44	−11	37	
10	Volna Pinsk	30	11	2	17	31	48	−17	35	
11	Veras Nesvizh (R)	30	9	8	13	31	39	−8	35	Dissolved
12	Smorgon	30	8	8	14	33	43	−10	32	
13	Belcard Grodno	30	8	6	16	25	40	−15	30 (Note: Belcard Grodno advanced over Vedrich-97 Rechitsa by better head-to-head record (1–2, 3–1).)	
14	Vedrich-97 Rechitsa	30	8	6	16	29	46	−17	30	
15	Kommunalnik Slonim (R)	30	5	13	12	23	48	−25	28	Relegation to Belarusian Second League
16	Lida (R)	30	4	7	19	23	59	−36	19	Relegation to Belarusian Second League

Source: football.by
Rules for classification: 1st points; 2nd matches won; 3rd head-to-head (points, matches won, goal difference, goals scored); 4th goal difference; 5th goals scored
(P) Promoted; (R) Relegated

=== Promotion play-offs ===
The 11th placed team of 2010 Premier League Torpedo Zhodino played a two-legged relegation play-off against the runners-up of 2010 Belarusian First League SKVICH Minsk for one spot in the 2011 Premier League. Torpedo Zhodino won the play-off 3–1 on aggregate and both teams retained their spots in respective leagues.

25 November 2010
13:00 GMT+2

SKVICH Minsk	1 – 3	Torpedo Zhodino

Minsk

28 November 2010
13:00 GMT+2

Torpedo Zhodino	0 – 0	SKVICH Minsk

Zhodino

== Results ==
Home \ Away	BAR	BCR	DSK	GOM	GRA	KHI	KOM	LID	POL	RUD	SKV	SLA	SMR	V97	VER	VOL
Baranovichi		0–0	4–1	0–2	1–1	3–0	1–1	2–1	0–0	2–2	1–1	0–1	1–0	1–2	1–0	1–0
Belcard Grodno	1–1		1–1	1–3	0–1	2–1	2–1	3–1	0–0	0–1	1–3	2–1	0–1	1–2	0–1	1–0
DSK Gomel	0–1	3–0		2–1	2–2	0–0	3–0	6–0	3–2	2–1	1–0	0–0	1–0	1–0	3–1	2–0
Gomel	5–1	2–0	2–0		2–0	2–0	3–0	4–0	3–0	0–0	1–0	3–0	3–0	6–0	5–2	5–1
Granit Mikashevichi	7–0	2–0	1–0	0–1		0–0	2–0	4–0	0–0	3–0	1–3	3–4	1–1	2–0	0–0	2–0
Khimik Svetlogorsk	2–0	2–1	1–4	0–2	0–2		1–1	4–0	2–0	1–4	1–5	1–0	3–1	1–0	1–1	1–1
Kommunalnik Slonim	2–2	1–1	0–2	0–3	0–2	2–2		0–0	0–4	0–2	1–1	1–1	0–0	2–1	1–1	3–0
Lida	0–2	1–2	2–5	1–2	1–2	1–2	1–1		0–1	2–1	0–3	0–1	1–1	1–0	1–1	1–2
Polotsk	1–1	3–0	1–1	0–4	1–1	1–4	3–1	0–0		1–2	0–0	0–0	1–0	0–0	1–2	1–2
Rudensk	2–0	2–0	0–0	2–5	1–4	2–1	0–1	1–1	2–2		1–0	0–0	2–1	2–1	0–2	0–2
SKVICH Minsk	0–1	2–0	3–0	3–1	1–0	0–0	5–0	1–0	2–1	1–1		3–1	1–2	2–2	1–1	4–0
Slavia Mozyr	1–0	2–1	1–4	1–2	0–1	2–1	1–2	2–1	2–2	1–0	1–2		0–4	1–1	2–4	1–3
Smorgon	3–1	0–0	1–1	1–2	1–1	1–3	1–1	3–1	1–5	0–2	0–1	1–1		3–0	2–1	3–1
Vedrich-97 Rechitsa	0–0	1–3	1–0	1–2	3–1	3–2	0–1	0–1	1–3	0–2	0–3	1–3	1–0		4–0	1–1
Veras Nesvizh	0–1	1–0	0–2	0–2	1–2	2–0	0–0	2–2	0–2	3–1	0–1	1–0	3–1	1–1		0–1
Volna Pinsk	1–2	0–2	1–2	0–3	0–4	1–0	3–0	1–2	0–2	3–1	2–0	0–2	4–0	0–2	1–0	

Source: football.by
Legend: Blue = home team win; Yellow = draw; Red = away team win.

== Top goalscorers ==
Rank	Name	Team	Goals
1	(Belarus) Yuri Markhel	SKVICH Minsk	28
2	(Belarus) Dmitri Platonov	Gomel	25
3	(Belarus) Kirill Shreitor	Granit Mikashevichi	19
4	(Belarus) Vadim Boiko	Granit Mikashevichi	12
4	(Belarus) Andrey Marozaw	DSK Gomel	12
4	(Belarus) Roman Volkov	Volna Pinsk	12
7	(Belarus) Syarhey Kazeka	Gomel	11
8	(Belarus) Sergey Zabolotsky	DSK Gomel	9
8	(Belarus) Kirill Pavlyuchek	Gomel	9
8	(Belarus) Aleksandr Luzhankov	Smorgon	9
8	(Belarus) Sergey Shalimo	Rudensk	9
8	(Belarus) Dmitry Kharitonchik	Slavia Mozyr	9
8	(Belarus) Andrey Dashuk	Khimik Svetlogorsk	9

Updated to games played on 13 November 2010
Source: football.by

== See also ==
- 2010 Belarusian Premier League
- 2009–10 Belarusian Cup
- 2010–11 Belarusian Cup
