= 2009 Belarusian Premier League =

Belarusian Premier League
- Season: 2009
- Champions: BATE Borisov
- Relegated: Gomel; Granit Mikashevichi; Smorgon
- Champions League: BATE Borisov
- Europa League: Dinamo Minsk; Dnepr Mogilev; Torpedo Zhodino
- Matches: 182
- Goals: 437 (2.4 per match)
- Top goalscorer: (Brazil) Maycon (15)
- Biggest home win: BATE 6–0 Neman
- Biggest away win: Shakhtyor 0–5 Minsk
- Highest scoring: Dinamo Minsk 5–2 Dnepr

The 2009 Belarusian Premier League was the 19th season of top-tier football in Belarus. It started on April 4 and ended on November 8, 2009. BATE Borisov were the defending champions.

== Team changes from 2008 season ==
Due to league reduction from 16 to 14 teams three relegated teams (Lokomotiv Minsk, Savit Mogilev and Darida Minsk Raion, who finished 14th, 15th and 16th in 2008 respectively) were replaced by only one team, the winner of 2008 First League Minsk.

== Overview ==
BATE Borisov won their 6th champions title and qualified for the next season's Champions League. The championship runners-up Dinamo Minsk, bronze medalists Dnepr Mogilev and yet to be determined 2009-10 Cup winners qualified for the Europa League. Due to decision to gradually reduce Premiere League to 12 clubs (14 in 2009, 12 in 2010) three lowest placed teams (Gomel, Granit Mikashevichi
Smorgon) relegated to the First League.

== Teams and venues ==
Location of teams in 2009 Belarusian Premier League

Team	Location	Venue	Capacity	Position in 2008
BATE	Borisov	City Stadium	5,392	1
Dinamo Minsk	Minsk	Dinamo-Yuni Stadium	4,500	2
MTZ-RIPO	Minsk	Traktor Stadium	17,600	3
Shakhtyor	Soligorsk	Stroitel Stadium	4,200	4
Vitebsk	Vitebsk	Vitebsky CSK	8,300	5
Dinamo Brest	Brest	OSK Brestskiy	10,080	6
Naftan	Novopolotsk	Atlant Stadium	5,300	7
Smorgon	Smorgon	Yunost Stadium	3,200	8
Dnepr	Mogilev	Spartak Stadium	7,300	9
Granit	Mikashevichi	Polesye Stadium (Luninets)	3,090	10
Gomel	Gomel	Central Stadium	14,307	11
Neman	Grodno	Neman Stadium	9,000	12
Torpedo	Zhodino	Torpedo Stadium (Zhodino)	3,020	13
Minsk	Minsk	Torpedo Stadium (Minsk)	1,500	First league, 1

1. Five games played at Dinamo Stadium.
2. Three games played at Torpedo Stadium in Mogilev due to renovation works at Spartak Stadium.
3. Four games played at Volna Stadium in Pinsk due to renovation works at Polesye Stadium.
4. One game played at City Stadium in Borisov and two games at Torpedo Stadium in Mogilev due to renovation works at Torpedo Stadium in Zhodino.
5. One game played at Dinamo Stadium and one game at Dinamo-Yuni Stadium.

== Table ==
Pos	Team	Pld	W	D	L	GF	GA	GD	Pts	Qualification or relegation
1	BATE Borisov (C)	26	19	5	2	55	16	+39	62	Qualification for Champions League second qualifying round
2	Dinamo Minsk	26	14	8	4	38	18	+20	50	Qualification for Europa League second qualifying round
3	Dnepr Mogilev	26	12	4	10	31	26	+5	40	Qualification for Europa League first qualifying round
4	Naftan Novopolotsk	26	12	2	12	28	39	−11	38	
5	Dinamo Brest	26	10	8	8	30	24	+6	38	
6	Shakhtyor Soligorsk	26	10	8	8	33	28	+5	38	
7	Neman Grodno	26	11	4	11	23	31	−8	37	
8	Torpedo Zhodino	26	10	7	9	31	22	+9	37	Qualification for Europa League first qualifying round (Note: The runner-up of the 2009–10 Belarusian Cup (lost to BATE Borisov).)
9	Minsk	26	11	3	12	33	26	+7	36	
10	Vitebsk	26	10	2	14	26	37	−11	32	
11	MTZ-RIPO Minsk	26	8	6	12	34	38	−4	30	
12	Gomel (R)	26	8	5	13	31	48	−17	29	Relegation to Belarusian First League
13	Granit Mikashevichi (R)	26	6	7	13	27	39	−12	25	Relegation to Belarusian First League
14	Smorgon (R)	26	2	9	15	17	46	−29	15	Relegation to Belarusian First League

Source: rsssf.com
Rules for classification: 1st points; 2nd matches won; 3rd head-to-head
(C) Champions; (R) Relegated

== Results ==
Home \ Away	BAT	DBR	DMI	DNE	GOM	GRA	MIN	MTZ	NAF	NEM	SHA	SMR	VIT	TZH
BATE Borisov		1–0	1–1	1–0	3–0	1–1	1–0	2–2	4–0	6–0	2–3	2–0	3–1	3–0
Dinamo Brest	1–2		0–1	0–0	3–1	3–1	1–2	1–0	2–0	2–0	1–1	1–1	3–0	2–2
Dinamo Minsk	1–3	2–0		5–2	1–2	1–0	2–1	5–0	2–0	2–0	0–1	1–1	2–1	0–0
Dnepr Mogilev	3–1	0–0	0–1		2–0	1–2	3–2	0–1	2–1	1–2	1–0	4–0	3–2	0–0
Gomel	0–3	3–1	1–2	2–0		1–1	1–3	3–3	1–3	0–3	2–1	3–2	1–1	2–1
Granit Mikashevichi	1–3	1–1	2–1	1–0	0–2		1–4	1–2	0–2	3–0 (Note: The match of Round 9 originally finished 1–1, but was awarded to Granit with a score of 3–0. The reason is that for some time during the match Neman had five foreign players on the pitch, while the maximum number of foreign players a team can have on the pitch in the same time is four.)	2–1	1–1	1–2	1–3
Minsk	0–1	2–0	0–0	2–1	1–0	1–0		1–2	2–0	0–0	1–1	2–0	0–1	0–4
MTZ-RIPO Minsk	0–2	1–1	0–2	0–1	4–2	2–2	1–0		4–0	0–2	1–2	2–1	1–2	0–0
Naftan Novopolotsk	0–4	1–0	0–2	2–1	1–2	3–1	1–0	2–1		2–0	0–4	3–0	2–1	1–0
Neman Grodno	1–2	0–1	0–0	0–1	1–0	0–0	2–1	2–1	2–0		2–1	1–1	1–0	1–0
Shakhtyor Soligorsk	0–1	1–1	1–1	1–2	1–1	0–0	0–5	1–0	1–1	2–0		2–0	3–0	0–1
Smorgon	0–0	0–1	0–0	0–2	1–1	1–0	1–3	0–4	2–2	0–2	2–2		0–3	0–1
Vitebsk	0–2	0–2	2–3	0–1	1–0	2–1	1–0	1–1	1–0	2–1	0–1	2–1		0–1
Torpedo Zhodino	1–1	1–2	0–0	0–0	4–0	1–3	1–0	2–1	0–1	3–0	1–2	1–2	3–0	

Source: football.by (in Belarusian)
Legend: Blue = home team win; Yellow = draw; Red = away team win.

== Belarusian clubs in European Cups ==
Round	Team #1	Agg.	Team #2	1st leg	2nd leg
2009–10 UEFA Europa League
First qualifying round	Sutjeska Nikšić (Montenegro)	2–3	(Belarus) MTZ-RIPO Minsk	1–1	1–2 (aet)
First qualifying round	Dinamo Minsk (Belarus)	3–2	(North Macedonia) Renova Džepčište	2–1	1–1
Second qualifying round	Naftan Novopolotsk (Belarus)	2–2 (a)	(Belgium) Gent	2–1	0–1
Second qualifying round	Dinamo Minsk (Belarus)	1–4	(Norway) Tromsø	0–0	1–4
Second qualifying round	Metallurg Donetsk (Ukraine)	5–1	(Belarus) MTZ-RIPO Minsk	3–0	2–1
Play-off round	BATE Borisov (Belarus)	4–1	(Bulgaria) Litex Lovech	0–1	4–0 (aet)
Group stage	Benfica (Portugal)	4–1	(Belarus) BATE Borisov	2–0	2–1
Group stage	BATE Borisov (Belarus)	2–2	(England) Everton	1–2	1–0
Group stage	BATE Borisov (Belarus)	4–3	(Greece) AEK Athens	2–1	2–2
2009–10 UEFA Champions League
Second qualifying round	Makedonija Gjorče Petrov (North Macedonia)	0–4	(Belarus) BATE Borisov	0–2	0–2
Third qualifying round	Ventspils (Latvia)	(a) 2–2	(Belarus) BATE Borisov	1–0	1–2

== Top goalscorers ==
Rank	Name	Team	Goals
1	(Brazil) Maycon	Gomel	15
2	(Belarus) Syarhey Kryvets	BATE Borisov	14
3	(Belarus) Maksim Skavysh	BATE Borisov	12
4	(Georgia (country)) Givi Kvaratskhelia	MTZ-RIPO Minsk	11
4	(Belarus) Raman Vasilyuk	Dinamo Brest	11
6	(Belarus) Dzmitry Mazalewski	Dinamo Brest	9
6	(Belarus) Andrey Razin	Minsk	9
8	(Belarus) Alyaksandr Hawrushka	Dinamo Minsk	8
8	(Belarus) Andrey Lyasyuk	Dnepr Mogilev	8
10	(Belarus) Dzmitry Asipenka	Minsk	7
10	(Belarus) Stanislaw Drahun	Dinamo Minsk	7
10	(Belarus) Ivan Dzenisevich	Neman Grodno	7
10	(Belarus) Syarhey Kislyak	Dinamo Minsk	7
10	(Belarus) Syarhey Koshal	Minsk	7
10	(Belarus) Vitali Rodionov	BATE Borisov	7
10	(Belarus) Alyaksandr Sazankow	Dnepr Mogilev	7
10	(Belarus) Andrey Sherakow	Torpedo Zhodino	7

Source: football.by (in Russian)

== See also ==
- 2009 Belarusian First League
- 2008–09 Belarusian Cup
- 2009–10 Belarusian Cup
