= 2010 Belarusian Premier League =

Belarusian Premier League
- Season: 2010
- Champions: BATE Borisov
- Relegated: Partizan Minsk
- Champions League: BATE Borisov
- Europa League: Shakhtyor Soligorsk; Minsk
- Matches: 198
- Goals: 498 (2.52 per match)
- Top goalscorer: (Brazil) Renan Bressan (15 goals)
- Biggest home win: BATE 6–0 Partizan
- Biggest away win: Neman 0–5 BATE; Vitebsk 1–6 BATE
- Highest scoring: Naftan 4–4 Partizan
- Longest winning run: BATE, Dinamo Minsk (6 games each)
- Longest unbeaten run: BATE (13 games)
- Longest winless run: Naftan, Vitebsk, Partizan (13 games each)
- Longest losing run: Torpedo, Partizan (7 games each)

The 2010 Belarusian Premier League was the 20th season of top-tier football in Belarus. It started on April 3 and ended on 20 November 2010. BATE Borisov are the defending champions.

== Teams ==
Location of teams in 2010 Belarusian Premier League

Gomel, Granit Mikashevichi and Smorgon were relegated to the Belarusian First League after finishing the 2009 season in the last three places. Due to the league reduction from 14 to 12 teams, only 2009 First League winners Belshina Bobruisk were promoted to the Premier League.

=== Team summaries ===
| Team | Location | Venue | Capacity | Position in 2009 |
|---|---|---|---|---|
| BATE | Borisov | City Stadium | 5,402 | 1 |
| Dinamo Minsk | Minsk | Dinamo-Yuni Stadium | 4,500 | 2 |
| Dnepr | Mogilev | Spartak Stadium (Mogilev) | 7,350 | 3 |
| Naftan | Novopolotsk | Atlant Stadium | 5,300 | 4 |
| Dinamo Brest | Brest | OSK Brestskiy | 10,162 | 5 |
| Shakhtyor | Soligorsk | Stroitel Stadium | 4,200 | 6 |
| Neman | Grodno | Neman Stadium | 8,500 | 7 |
| Torpedo | Zhodino | Torpedo Stadium (Zhodino) | 3,020 | 8 |
| Minsk | Minsk | Dinamo Stadium | 36,900 | 9 |
| Vitebsk | Vitebsk | Vitebsky CSK | 8,300 | 10 |
| Partizan | Minsk | Traktor Stadium | 17,600 | 11 |
| Belshina | Bobruisk | Spartak Stadium (Bobruisk) | 3,700 | First League, 1 |

1. One game played at Dinamo Stadium and one at Traktor Stadium.
2. Two games played at Vitebsky CSK in Vitebsk due to renovation works at Atlant Stadium.
3. Four games played at Torpedo Stadium in Minsk.
4. One game played at Spartak Stadium in Mogilev.

== League table ==
| Pos | Team | Pld | W | D | L | GF | GA | GD | Pts | Qualification or relegation |
|---|---|---|---|---|---|---|---|---|---|---|
| 1 | BATE Borisov (C) | 33 | 21 | 9 | 3 | 64 | 18 | +46 | 72 | Qualification for Champions League second qualifying round |
| 2 | Shakhtyor Soligorsk | 33 | 19 | 9 | 5 | 51 | 23 | +28 | 66 | Qualification for Europa League second qualifying round |
| 3 | Minsk | 33 | 18 | 6 | 9 | 59 | 32 | +27 | 60 | Qualification for Europa League first qualifying round |
| 4 | Dinamo Minsk | 33 | 17 | 5 | 11 | 49 | 34 | +15 | 56 | |
| 5 | Dinamo Brest | 33 | 12 | 10 | 11 | 48 | 40 | +8 | 46 | |
| 6 | Belshina Bobruisk | 33 | 12 | 9 | 12 | 31 | 42 | −11 | 45 | |
| 7 | Naftan Novopolotsk | 33 | 11 | 11 | 11 | 41 | 34 | +7 | 44 | |
| 8 | Dnepr Mogilev | 33 | 11 | 7 | 15 | 40 | 53 | −13 | 40 | |
| 9 | Vitebsk | 33 | 7 | 11 | 15 | 31 | 52 | −21 | 32 | |
| 10 | Neman Grodno | 33 | 7 | 10 | 16 | 27 | 42 | −15 | 31 | |
| 11 | Torpedo Zhodino (O) | 33 | 7 | 7 | 19 | 33 | 58 | −25 | 28 | Qualification to relegation play-offs |
| 12 | Partizan Minsk (R) | 33 | 5 | 8 | 20 | 24 | 70 | −46 | 23 | Relegation to Belarusian First League |

Source: football.by
Rules for classification: 1st points; 2nd matches won; 3rd head-to-head (points, matches won, goal difference, goals scored); 4th goal difference; 5th goals scored.
FC Gomel of the Belarusian First League were the winners of the 2010–11 Belarusian Cup competition and qualified for the third qualifying round of UEFA Europa League.
(C) Champions; (O) Play-off winners; (R) Relegated

=== Relegation play-offs ===
Torpedo Zhodino played a two-legged relegation play-off against SKVICH Minsk, the runners-up of 2010 Belarusian First League for one spot in the 2011 Premier League. Torpedo Zhodino won the play-off 3–1 on aggregate and retained their spot in the top flight.

25 November 2010
13:00 GMT+2

| SKVICH Minsk | 1 – 3 | Torpedo Zhodino |

Minsk

28 November 2010
13:00 GMT+2

| Torpedo Zhodino | 0 – 0 | SKVICH Minsk |

Zhodino

== Results ==
=== First and second round ===
| Home \ Away | BAT | BSH | DBR | DMI | DNE | MIN | NAF | NEM | PAR | SHA | TZH | VIT |
|---|---|---|---|---|---|---|---|---|---|---|---|---|
| BATE Borisov | | 2–0 | 1–0 | 1–3 | 3–0 | 1–2 | 1–1 | 0–0 | 6–0 | 2–0 | 1–0 | 4–0 |
| Belshina Bobruisk | 0–1 | | 1–0 | 0–2 | 2–1 | 1–0 | 1–0 | 0–2 | 2–0 | 1–0 | 2–0 | 0–0 |
| Dinamo Brest | 1–4 | 1–1 | | 1–2 | 2–3 | 2–1 | 0–0 | 4–0 | 1–1 | 1–1 | 3–2 | 5–2 |
| Dinamo Minsk | 0–1 | 3–0 | 2–2 | | 3–0 | 0–2 | 0–0 | 1–0 | 0–0 | 0–1 | 5–1 | 1–1 |
| Dnepr Mogilev | 0–2 | 1–3 | 2–1 | 1–0 | | 1–5 | 1–0 | 0–0 | 3–0 | 0–2 | 3–1 | 0–0 |
| Minsk | 0–0 | 3–1 | 1–1 | 0–2 | 2–1 | | 3–1 | 3–1 | 3–0 | 0–2 | 2–1 | 5–1 |
| Naftan Novopolotsk | 0–2 | 4–0 | 3–1 | 0–2 | 5–0 | 0–0 | | 4–1 | 1–0 | 0–2 | 1–1 | 0–0 |
| Neman Grodno | 0–5 | 2–2 | 0–0 | 0–1 | 1–2 | 0–1 | 0–0 | | 0–1 | 0–0 | 0–0 | 0–0 |
| Partizan Minsk | 1–1 | 1–2 | 0–3 | 0–2 | 1–0 | 1–4 | 1–1 | 0–4 | | 0–2 | 2–3 | 0–2 |
| Shakhtyor Soligorsk | 0–0 | 1–1 | 2–0 | 2–4 | 0–0 | 1–0 | 0–0 | 4–1 | 1–0 | | 4–1 | 1–1 |
| Torpedo Zhodino | 0–1 | 1–2 | 0–1 | 2–0 | 2–3 | 0–4 | 1–4 | 2–0 | 2–2 | 1–1 | | 0–4 |
| Vitebsk | 0–0 | 0–0 | 0–1 | 3–1 | 1–1 | 0–3 | 4–2 | 2–2 | 0–1 | 1–3 | 0–2 | |

Source: football.by
Legend: Blue = home team win; Yellow = draw; Red = away team win.

=== Third round ===
| Home \ Away | BAT | BSH | DBR | DMI | DNE | MIN | NAF | NEM | PAR | SHA | TZH | VIT |
|---|---|---|---|---|---|---|---|---|---|---|---|---|
| BATE Borisov | | | 2–0 | 4–0 | | 2–1 | 1–0 | | | 1–2 | | |
| Belshina Bobruisk | 1–3 | | | | 1–1 | 2–0 | 1–1 | | | 1–3 | 1–1 | |
| Dinamo Brest | | 2–0 | | | | | | 2–1 | 4–0 | | 3–1 | 2–0 |
| Dinamo Minsk | | 4–0 | 2–0 | | 2–1 | | | 1–0 | 5–1 | | | 0–2 |
| Dnepr Mogilev | 2–3 | | 1–1 | | | 3–0 | | 1–0 | | | 0–1 | |
| Minsk | | | 2–2 | 0–0 | | | 2–0 | 2–0 | | 1–2 | | |
| Naftan Novopolotsk | | | 1–0 | 2–0 | 1–2 | | | 2–1 | 4–4 | 1–0 | | |
| Neman Grodno | 1–1 | 2–0 | | | | | | | 2–0 | | 2–1 | 3–0 |
| Partizan Minsk | 1–1 | 0–0 | | | 4–3 | 1–3 | | | | | 1–0 | 0–1 |
| Shakhtyor Soligorsk | | | 1–1 | 3–0 | 3–2 | | | 0–1 | 4–0 | | | 2–1 |
| Torpedo Zhodino | 1–1 | | | 3–1 | | 1–1 | 0–2 | | | 0–1 | | |
| Vitebsk | 1–6 | 0–2 | | | 1–1 | 1–3 | 2–0 | | | | 0–1 | |

Source: football.by
Legend: Blue = home team win; Yellow = draw; Red = away team win.

== Top goalscorers ==
| Rank | Name | Team | Goals |
|---|---|---|---|
| 1 | (Brazil) Renan Bressan | BATE Borisov | 15 |
| 2 | (Belarus) Dzmitry Kavalyonak | Neman Grodno | 12 |
| 3 | (Belarus) Andrey Razin | Minsk | 11 |
| 4 | (Belarus) Dzmitry Asipenka | Minsk | 10 |
| 4 | (Belarus) Mikalay Yanush | Dinamo Brest | 10 |
| 6 | (Belarus) Andrey Sheryakov | Minsk | 9 |
| 6 | (Belarus) Vladimir Yurchenko | Dnepr Mogilev | 9 |
| 6 | (Belarus) Maksim Skavysh | BATE Borisov | 9 |
| 6 | (Russia) Aleksandr Alumona | BATE Borisov / Shakhtyor Soligorsk | 9 |
| 6 | (Belarus) Pavel Sitko | Shakhtyor Soligorsk | 9 |
| 6 | (Belarus) Syarhey Kislyak | Dinamo Minsk | 9 |
| 6 | (Belarus) Artur Lyavitski | Torpedo Zhodino | 9 |
| 6 | (Belarus) Dzmitry Mazalewski | Dinamo Brest | 9 |

Updated to games played on 21 November 2010
Source: football.by

== See also ==
- 2010 Belarusian First League
- 2009–10 Belarusian Cup
- 2010–11 Belarusian Cup
