= 2012 Belarusian Premier League =

Belarusian Premier League
- Season: 2012
- Champions: BATE
- Champions League: BATE
- Europa League: Shakhtyor; Dinamo Minsk
- Matches: 165
- Goals: 380 (2.3 per match)
- Top goalscorer: Dzmitry Asipenka (14 goals)
- Biggest home win: Neman 8–0 Slavia
- Biggest away win: Belshina 0–4 Shakhtyor; Naftan 0–4 BATE; Torpedo 1–5 Neman; Neman 0–4 Shakhtyor
- Highest scoring: Neman 8–0 Slavia; Minsk 4–4 Neman

The 2012 Belarusian Premier League was the 22nd season of top-tier football in Belarus. It began on 24 March 2012 and ended on 25 November 2012. BATE Borisov were the defending champions, having won their 8th league title last year.

== Teams ==
Locations of teams in the 2012 Belarusian Premier League

Dnepr Mogilev were relegated to the Belarusian First League after finishing the 2011 season in last place, leaving the league for the first time since the competition's establishment in 1992. They were replaced by 2011 First League champions Slavia Mozyr, who make their return to the league after a five-year absence.

Vitebsk, as the 11th-placed team, had to compete in the relegation/promotion playoffs against First League runners-up Partizan Minsk. Partizan Minsk won the playoff, 3–2 on aggregate, and returned to the league after a one-year absence while Vitebsk were relegated after six years in the top flight. In early 2012 Partizan was abandoned by their main sponsor Vladimir Romanov and consequently wasn't able to keep any of the first team players or obtain the Premier League license. Partizan withdrew from the Premier League, leaving it with only 11 teams.

Dinamo Brest changed their name to Brest due to troubles with further usage of Dinamo brand name.

=== Stadiums and locations ===
Club	Location	Stadium	Capacity	Position in 2011
BATE	Borisov	City Stadium	5,402	1
Belshina	Bobruisk	Spartak Stadium	3,700	5
Brest	Brest	OSK Brestskiy	10,162	4
Dinamo Minsk	Minsk	Dinamo-Yuni Stadium	4,500	4
Gomel	Gomel	Central Stadium	14,307	3
Minsk	Minsk	Dinamo Stadium	34,000	9
Naftan	Novopolotsk	Atlant Stadium	4,500	7
Neman	Grodno	Neman Stadium	8,500	8
Shakhtyor	Soligorsk	Stroitel Stadium	4,200	2
Slavia Mozyr	Mozyr	Yunost Stadium	5,353	First League, 1
Torpedo-BelAZ	Zhodino	Torpedo Stadium (Zhodino)	6,524	6

1. Two games played at Lokomotiv Stadium in Zhlobin.
2. Three games played at Dinamo Stadium.
3. Two games played at Torpedo Stadium in Minsk and one game at Dinamo-Yuni Stadium.
4. Four games played at City Stadium in Khoiniki.

== League table ==
Pos	Team	Pld	W	D	L	GF	GA	GD	Pts	Qualification
1	BATE Borisov (C)	30	21	5	4	51	16	+35	68	Qualification for Champions League second qualifying round
2	Shakhtyor Soligorsk	30	18	7	5	59	24	+35	61	Qualification for Europa League second qualifying round
3	Dinamo Minsk	30	16	8	6	37	19	+18	56	Qualification for Europa League first qualifying round
4	Gomel	30	14	8	8	39	24	+15	50	
5	Neman Grodno	30	10	11	9	43	36	+7	41	
6	Minsk	30	11	6	13	36	46	−10	39	Qualification for Europa League second qualifying round (Note: Winners of 2012–13 Belarusian Cup will qualify for the second qualifying round of UEFA Europa League)
7	Belshina Bobruisk	30	7	9	14	26	40	−14	30	
8	Brest	30	8	5	17	27	38	−11	29	
9	Naftan Novopolotsk	30	7	8	15	23	40	−17	29	
10	Slavia Mozyr	30	7	6	17	22	58	−36	27	
11	Torpedo-BelAZ Zhodino (O)	30	5	9	16	17	39	−22	24	Qualification to relegation play-offs

Source: football.by
Rules for classification: 1st points; 2nd matches won; 3rd head-to-head (points, matches won, goal difference, goals scored); 4th goal difference; 5th goals scored
(C) Champions; (O) Play-off winners

=== Relegation playoffs ===
The 11th team of the league Torpedo-BelAZ Zhodino will play a two-legged relegation play-off against the runners-up of the 2012 Belarusian First League Gorodeya for one spot in the 2013 Premier League.

29 November 2012
13:00 UTC+3

Gorodeya	1 – 0	Torpedo-BelAZ Zhodino
Lebedzew 6'	Report

Gorodeya Stadium, Gorodeya
Attendance: 800
Referee: Denis Scherbakov (Minsk)

2 December 2012
13:00 UTC+3

Torpedo-BelAZ Zhodino	4 – 0	Gorodeya
Vyarheychyk 31'; Mendy 54'; Vaskow 64'; Yatskevich 75'	Report

Torpedo Stadium, Zhodino
Attendance: 2,300
Referee: Vadim Panchenko (Mogilev)

== Results ==
Each team will play three times against every other team for a total of 30 matches.

=== First and second round ===
Home \ Away	BAT	BSH	BRE	DMI	GOM	MIN	NAF	NEM	SHA	SLA	TZH
BATE Borisov		3–1	0–1	1–3	0–0	2–0	3–0	2–0	1–0	2–1	0–0
Belshina Bobruisk	0–1		3–1	1–0	1–1	3–0	0–0	0–0	0–4	3–0	0–0
Brest	0–2	1–1		1–2	0–1	0–1	2–1	1–1	1–2	1–2	1–0
Dinamo Minsk	0–2	1–0	1–0		0–1	1–0	4–2	1–1	1–2	3–1	2–0
Gomel	0–1	1–0	2–0	0–0		2–2	0–0	1–1	1–1	3–0	2–0
Minsk	1–0	3–0	2–1	0–0	1–2		1–0	4–4	0–2	3–2	1–2
Naftan Novopolotsk	0–4	3–0	1–0	0–2	0–1	1–3		2–1	1–2	0–0	0–0
Neman Grodno	1–2	1–0	1–1	0–0	0–3	0–1	3–0		1–1	8–0	1–1
Shakhtyor Soligorsk	1–1	2–1	0–1	1–0	1–2	7–0	0–0	1–1		5–0	1–0
Slavia Mozyr	1–2	1–0	2–1	0–2	0–2	1–0	2–1	1–3	0–2		1–0
Torpedo-BelAZ Zhodino	0–2	0–1	1–0	0–0	1–0	2–1	0–1	1–5	2–3	0–0	

Source: football.by
Legend: Blue = home team win; Yellow = draw; Red = away team win.

=== Third round ===
Home \ Away	BAT	BSH	BRE	DMI	GOM	MIN	NAF	NEM	SHA	SLA	TZH
BATE Borisov			3–1			5–1		5–1	2–1		2–0
Belshina Bobruisk	0–1			0–2	3–1		3–2			0–0	
Brest		4–0		2–0	2–1		0–1			2–0	
Dinamo Minsk	0–0				1–0		1–1	1–0		4–2	
Gomel	1–2						2–0	0–1		4–1	3–0
Minsk		2–2	0–0	0–2	1–1					3–0	
Naftan Novopolotsk	1–0					1–2		1–0	1–2		1–1
Neman Grodno		0–0	3–0			2–1			0–4		2–1
Shakhtyor Soligorsk		3–1	4–2	1–1	4–1	0–2					
Slavia Mozyr	0–0						1–1	0–1	0–0		3–2
Torpedo-BelAZ Zhodino		2–2	0–0	0–2		1–0			0–2		

Source: football.by
Legend: Blue = home team win; Yellow = draw; Red = away team win.

== Top goalscorers ==
Rank	Goalscorer	Team	Goals
1	(Belarus) Dzmitry Asipenka	Shakhtyor Soligorsk	14
2	(Belarus) Renan Bressan	BATE Borisov	11
2	(Belarus) Roman Volkov	Slavia Mozyr	11
2	(Belarus) Dzmitry Kamarowski	Shakhtyor Soligorsk	11
5	(Belarus) Ivan Dzenisevich	Neman Grodno	10
6	(Belarus) Uladzimir Khvashchynski	Brest	9
6	(Belarus) Dzmitry Mazalewski	BATE Borisov	9
8	(Belarus) Vitali Rodionov	BATE Borisov	8
8	(Belarus) Leanid Kovel	Minsk	8
8	(Belarus) Mikalay Yanush	Shakhtyor Soligorsk	8
8	(Belarus) Dzmitry Platonaw	Gomel	8
8	(Belarus) Andrey Lyasyuk	Neman Grodno	8

Updated to games played on 25 November 2012
Source: football.by

== Awards ==
=== Player of the month ===
Month	Player	Team	Notes
April	(Belarus) Dzmitry Baha	BATE Borisov	
May	(Belarus) Andrey Harbunow	BATE Borisov	
June	(Belarus) Dzmitry Asipenka	Shakhtyor Soligorsk	
July	(Belarus) Raman Vasilyuk	Minsk	
August	(Belarus) Ivan Dzenisevich	Neman Grodno	
September	(Belarus) Alyaksandr Pawlaw	BATE Borisov	
October	(Belarus) Roman Volkov	Slavia Mozyr	
November	(Belarus) Andrey Lyasyuk	Neman Grodno	

== See also ==
- 2012 Belarusian First League
- 2011–12 Belarusian Cup
- 2012–13 Belarusian Cup
