= 2009 Belarusian First League =

Belarusian First League
- Season: 2009
- Champions: Belshina Bobruisk
- Promoted: Belshina Bobruisk
- Relegated: Spartak Shklov
- Matches: 182
- Goals: 456 (2.51 per match)

2009 Belarusian First League was the 19th season of 2nd level football championship in Belarus. It started in April and ended in November 2008.

== Team changes from 2008 season ==
The winners of last season (Minsk) were promoted to Belarusian Premier League. Due to reduction of Premier League, the promoted team was replaced by three teams that finished at the bottom of 2008 Belarusian Premier League table (Lokomotiv Minsk, Savit Mogilev and Darida Minsk Raion).

One team that finished at the bottom of 2008 season table (PMC Postavy) relegated to the Second League. They were replaced by the best team of 2008 Second League (DSK Gomel).

Two of the three teams that relegated from Premier League (Savit Mogilev and Darida Minsk Raion) disbanded during the off-season. No teams were invited to replace them, and the planned First League expansion from 14 to 16 clubs did not happen.

Lokomotiv Minsk changed their name to SKVICH Minsk and Dinamo-Belcard Grodno shortened their name to Belcard Grodno prior to the season.

== Teams and locations ==
Location of teams in 2009 Belarusian First League

Team	Location	Position in 2008
SKVICH	Minsk	Premier League, 14
Khimik	Svetlogorsk	2
Belshina	Bobruisk	3
Volna	Pinsk	4
Veras	Nesvizh	5
Vedrich-97	Rechitsa	6
Belcard	Grodno	7
Spartak	Shklov	8
Baranovichi	Baranovichi	9
Kommunalnik	Slonim	10
Lida	Lida	11
Polotsk	Polotsk	12
Slavia	Mozyr	13
DSK	Gomel	Second League, 1

== League table ==
Pos	Team	Pld	W	D	L	GF	GA	GD	Pts	Promotion or relegation
1	Belshina Bobruisk (P)	26	20	4	2	55	15	+40	64	Promotion to Belarusian Premier League
2	Volna Pinsk	26	16	3	7	52	31	+21	51	
3	DSK Gomel	26	13	9	4	34	18	+16	48	
4	Veras Nesvizh	26	12	7	7	33	26	+7	43	
5	SKVICH Minsk	26	11	6	9	37	29	+8	39	
6	Baranovichi	26	10	8	8	39	33	+6	38	
7	Khimik Svetlogorsk	26	9	9	8	33	28	+5	36	
8	Vedrich-97 Rechitsa	26	10	5	11	40	47	−7	35	
9	Belcard Grodno	26	8	5	13	23	34	−11	29	
10	Kommunalnik Slonim	26	7	8	11	20	32	−12	29	
11	Lida	26	6	8	12	19	31	−12	26	
12	Polotsk	26	6	4	16	29	46	−17	22	
13	Slavia Mozyr	26	4	8	14	21	40	−19	20 (Note: Slavia Mozyr defeated Spartak Shklov in an additional 13/14th place decider match 2–1 (on 8 November in Minsk).)	
14	Spartak Shklov (R)	26	4	8	14	21	46	−25	20	Relegation to Belarusian Second League

Source: rsssf.com
Rules for classification: 1st points; 2nd matches won; 3rd head-to-head (points, matches won, goal difference, goals scored); 4th goal difference; 5th goals scored
(P) Promoted; (R) Relegated

== Top goalscorers ==
Rank	Goalscorer	Team	Goals
1	(Belarus) Mikhail Kolyadko	Baranovichi	15
2	(Belarus) Syarhey Kazeka	Baranovichi	12
3	(Belarus) Yuri Syrokvashko	SKVICH Minsk	11
3	(Belarus) Yuri Markhel	SKVICH Minsk	11
3	(Belarus) Sergey Zabolotsky	DSK Gomel	11

== See also ==
- 2009 Belarusian Premier League
- 2008–09 Belarusian Cup
- 2009–10 Belarusian Cup
