= Igor Dovgyallo =

Belarusian footballer

Personal information
- Date of birth: 15 July 1985 (age 41)
- Place of birth: Vitebsk, Byelorussian SSR, Soviet Union
- Height: 1.90 m (6 ft 3 in)
- Position: Goalkeeper

Youth career
- 2004–2006: Lokomotiv Vitebsk

Senior career*
Years	Team	Apps	(Gls)
2005–2006	Lokomotiv Vitebsk	3	(0)
2007	Polotsk	11	(1)
2007–2008	Myasokombinat Vitebsk	27	(0)
2009	Smorgon	7	(0)
2010–2011	Polotsk	42	(0)
2012–2016	Naftan Novopolotsk	95	(0)
2017–2018	Dnepr Mogilev	27	(0)
2018–2020	Gorodeya	61	(0)
2021–2023	Naftan Novopolotsk	55	(0)
- * Club domestic league appearances and goals as of 2 December 2023

Igor Dovgyallo (Belarusian: Iгар Даўгяла; Russian: Игорь Довгялло; born 17 July 1985) is a Belarusian former footballer.

== Honours ==
Naftan Novopolotsk

- Belarusian Cup winner: 2011–12
