= Dzyanis Obrazaw =

Belarusian footballer

Personal information
- Date of birth: 24 June 1988 (age 38)
- Place of birth: Vitebsk, Byelorussian SSR, Soviet Union
- Height: 1.76 m (5 ft 9 1/2 in)
- Position: Defender

Youth career
- 2004–2006: Dinamo Minsk

Senior career*
Years	Team	Apps	(Gls)
2005	Molodechno	3	(0)
2007	Polotsk	21	(3)
2008–2011	Dnepr Mogilev	65	(0)
2012–2013	Naftan Novopolotsk	41	(0)
2014–2016	Dnepr Mogilev	80	(2)
2017–2020	Slutsk	82	(1)
2020	Atyrau	9	(0)
2021–2023	Slutsk	54	(1)

International career
2010–2011	Belarus U21	2	(0)

Managerial career
- 2025: Dnepr Mogilev (caretaker)
- * Club domestic league appearances and goals

Dzyanis Obrazaw (Belarusian: Дзяніс Образаў; Russian: Денис Образов; born 24 June 1988) is a Belarusian former professional footballer.

== Honours ==
Naftan Novolopotsk

- Belarusian Cup winner: 2011–12
