= Korolyuk =

Korolyuk (Ukrainian: Королюк). Is a Ukrainian surname.

- Alexey Korolyuk
- Alexander Korolyuk
- Paraska Korolyuk
- Volodymyr Korolyuk
- Yuri Korolyuk
