= Vadzim Mytnik =

Belarusian footballer

Personal information
- Date of birth: 5 July 1988 (age 38)
- Place of birth: Belarus
- Positions: Defender; midfielder

Youth career
- 2006–2007: Dinamo Minsk

Senior career*
Years	Team	Apps	(Gls)
2005	Molodechno-2000	9	(0)
2006–2007	Dinamo Minsk	0	(0)
2008–2010	Veras Nesvizh	59	(1)
2010	Dnepr Mogilev	3	(0)
2011	Klechesk Kletsk	18	(2)
2012	SKVICH Minsk	7	(0)
2012	Volna Pinsk	8	(0)
2013	Bereza-2010	6	(0)
2013	Volna Pinsk	14	(1)
2014	Minsk-2	29	(0)
2022–2023	Zenit Międzybórz	12	(0)
- * Club domestic league appearances and goals

Vadzim Mytnik (Belarusian: Вадзім Мытнік; Russian: Вадим Мытник; born 5 July 1988) is a Belarusian former professional footballer.

His father Ihar Mytnik played football professionally in the 1980s and 1990s.

== Honours ==
Zenit Międzybórz

- Regional league Wrocław: 2022–23
