= Elvin Aliyev =

Elvin Aliyev may refer to:

- Elvin Aliyev (footballer, born 1984)
- Elvin Aliyev (footballer, born 2000)
