= Ivan Vasilyonok =

Belarusian footballer

Personal information
- Date of birth: 17 May 1989 (age 37)
- Place of birth: Sloboda, Smolevichi Raion, Minsk Oblast, Belarusian SSR
- Height: 1.79 m (5 ft 10 1/2 in)
- Position: Defender

Youth career
- 2006–2007: BATE Borisov
- 2008: Darida Minsk Raion

Senior career*
Years	Team	Apps	(Gls)
2009–2010	Gorodeya	43	(0)
2011	Klechesk Kletsk	26	(1)
2012–2014	Smolevichi-STI	77	(7)
2014–2015	Slavia Mozyr	17	(0)
2016	Neman-Agro Stolbtsy	1	(0)
2016–2020	Smolevichi	82	(1)
2020	Krumkachy Minsk	14	(0)
- * Club domestic league appearances and goals as of 31 December 2020

Ivan Vasilyonok (Belarusian: Іван Васілёнак, Russian: Иван Василёнок; born 17 May 1989) is a Belarusian former professional footballer.
