= Renan Bressan =

Belarusian footballer

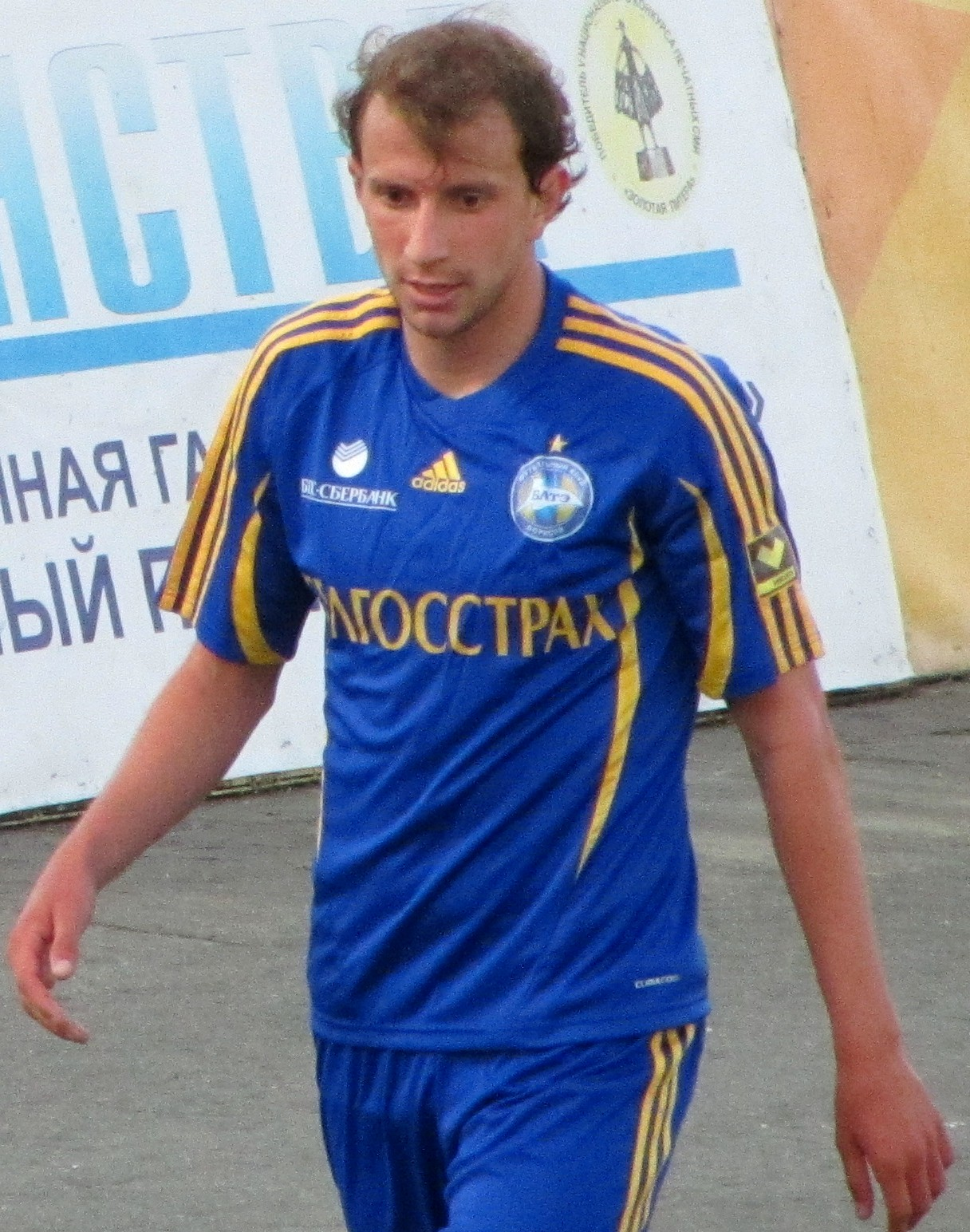
- Bressan with BATE Borisov in 2012.

Personal information
- Full name: Renan Bardini Bressan
- Date of birth: 3 November 1988 (age 38)
- Place of birth: Tubarão, Brazil
- Height: 1.82 m (6 ft 0 in)
- Position: Attacking midfielder

Youth career
- Atlético Tubarão

Senior career*
Years	Team	Apps	(Gls)
2005–2006	Atlético Tubarão		
2007–2009	Gomel	77	(7)
2010–2012	BATE Borisov	91	(39)
2013	Alania Vladikavkaz	18	(0)
2014	Aktobe	0	(0)
2014	Astana	6	(1)
2014–2016	Rio Ave	45	(8)
2016–2017	APOEL	7	(1)
2017–2019	Chaves	71	(10)
2019	Cuiabá	3	(0)
2020–2021	Paraná	35	(7)
2021	Juventude	4	(0)
2021	CRB	28	(6)
2022–2023	Criciúma	6	(0)
2022	→ Vila Nova (loan)	0	(0)
2023	Hercílio Luz	12	(3)
2023	ABC	8	(0)
Total		411	(82)

International career
2012	Belarus Olympic	4	(1)
2012–2018	Belarus	28	(3)
- * Club domestic league appearances and goals

Renan Bardini Bressan (Belarusian: Рэнан Бардзіні Брэссан; born 3 November 1988) is a former professional footballer who played as an attacking midfielder. Born in Brazil, he played for the Belarus national team.

== Club career ==
=== FC Gomel ===
Born in Tubarão, Santa Catarina, Bressan began his career at hometown club Clube Atlético Tubarão. In April 2007 he moved abroad for the first time, joining Belarusian FC Gomel.

=== BATE Borisov ===
On 28 January 2010, Bressan signed with BATE Borisov. He scored 15 goals during his first season with BATE, becoming the top scorer in the Belarusian Premier League for the 2010 season. He was also selected as the best midfielder in the league for the year.

On 2 October 2012, Bressan scored BATE's third goal in their 3–1 shock defeat of Bayern Munich in the second game of the Champions League group stage.

=== Alania Vladikavkaz ===
In late November 2012, Russian Premier League club Alania Vladikavkaz acquired the services of Bressan. In October 2013, Bressan unilaterally terminated the contract because of gross violations of financial terms of the agreement by the club.

=== FC Astana ===
On 15 January 2014, Bressan signed a two-year contract with FK Aktobe, but less than a month later his contract was mutually terminated on 7 February. Bressan went on to sign a two-year contract with FC Astana on the 10th, but was released from his contract on 12 July after only 7 games for the club.

=== Rio Ave ===
On 2 August 2014, Bressan signed a two-year contract with Portuguese Primeira Liga club Rio Ave.

=== APOEL ===
On 24 June 2016, Bressan signed a two-year contract with reigning Cypriot champions APOEL FC. He made his competitive debut on 19 July 2016, coming on as a 58th-minute substitute in APOEL's 3–0 home win against The New Saints for the second qualifying round of the UEFA Champions League. He scored his first goal for APOEL on 6 November 2016, netting the fourth goal in his team's 4–1 home victory against Karmiotissa for the Cypriot First Division. On 9 January 2017, his contract with APOEL was mutually terminated.

== International career ==
Bressan has Belarusian citizenship and is eligible to play in official competitions for the Belarus national team since April 2012. He made his debut for Belarus on 29 February 2012 in a friendly match against Moldova. During the football tournament of the 2012 Summer Olympics he was one of three overage players selected by the Belarusian federation and scored the only goal for Belarus U23 in a 3–1 loss against the country he was born in – Brazil.

== Career statistics ==
Scores and results list Belarus' goal tally first, score column indicates score after each Bressan goal.

List of international goals scored by Renan Bressan
No.	Date	Venue	Opponent	Score	Result	Competition
1	15 August 2012	Republican Stadium, Yerevan, Armenia	Armenia	1–0	2–1	Friendly
2	15 August 2012	Republican Stadium, Yerevan, Armenia	Armenia	2–0	2–1	Friendly
3	16 October 2012	Dinamo Stadium, Minsk, Belarus	Georgia	1–0	2–0	2014 World Cup qualifier

== Honours ==
BATE Borisov

- Belarusian Premier League: 2010, 2011, 2012
- Belarusian Cup: 2009–10
- Belarusian Super Cup: 2010, 2011

Astana

- Kazakhstan Premier League: 2014

Individual

- Belarusian Premier League top scorer: 2010, 2011
- Belarusian Footballer of the Year: 2012
