= Yakov Kazak =

Belarusian footballer

Personal information
- Date of birth: 1 August 1985 (age 41)
- Place of birth: Minsk, Belarusian SSR
- Height: 1.77 m (5 ft 10 in)
- Position: Midfielder

Youth career
- 2001: Torpedo-MAZ Minsk

Senior career*
Years	Team	Apps	(Gls)
2002–2008	Lokomotiv Minsk	1	(0)
2002	→ SKVICH Minsk	17	(1)
2007	→ SKVICH Minsk	30	(9)
2008–2009	Baranovichi	33	(1)
2010–2011	Rudensk	40	(3)
2011–2012	Slavia Mozyr	28	(4)
2013	Smorgon	24	(2)
2014	Smolevichi-STI	26	(1)
- * Club domestic league appearances and goals

Yakov Kazak (Belarusian: Якаў Казак; Russian: Яков Казак; born 1 August 1985) is a retired Belarusian footballer who last played for Smolevichi-STI.
