= Andrey Yakimov =

Belarusian footballer

Personal information
- Date of birth: 17 November 1989 (age 36)
- Place of birth: Antopal, Brest Oblast, Belarusian SSR
- Height: 1.87 m (6 ft 1 1/2 in)
- Position: Midfielder

Team information
- Current team: Neman Grodno
- Number: 24

Youth career
- 2007–2009: Naftan Novopolotsk

Senior career*
Years	Team	Apps	(Gls)
2010–2012	Naftan Novopolotsk	18	(1)
2010	→ Volna Pinsk (loan)	14	(2)
2013	Vitebsk	28	(7)
2014–2016	Naftan Novopolotsk	59	(5)
2017–	Neman Grodno	257	(24)
- * Club domestic league appearances and goals as of 3 July 2026

Andrey Yakimov (Belarusian: Андрэй Якiмаў; Russian: Андрей Якимов; born 17 November 1989) is a Belarusian footballer playing currently for Neman Grodno.

== Honours ==
Naftan Novopolotsk

- Belarusian Cup winner: 2011–12
