= Mihail Harbachow =

Belarusian footballer

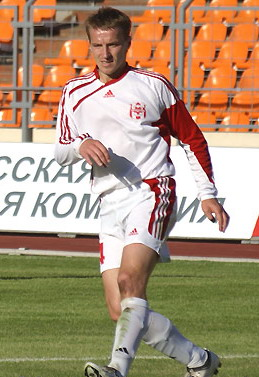

Personal information
- Full name: Mikhail Kanstantsinavich Harbachow
- Date of birth: 29 July 1983 (age 43)
- Place of birth: Kirawsk, Mogilev Oblast, Belarusian SSR
- Height: 1.83 m (6 ft 0 in)
- Position: Defender

Senior career*
Years	Team	Apps	(Gls)
2000	RUOR Minsk	6	(0)
2000	Berezina Bobruisk	7	(0)
2001–2006	Belshina Bobruisk	112	(7)
2007–2012	Naftan Novopolotsk	159	(13)
2013–2015	Belshina Bobruisk	70	(2)
2016–2017	Naftan Novopolotsk	45	(1)
2018	Belshina Bobruisk	1	(0)
2018	Lida	14	(0)

International career
2002–2004	Belarus U21	5	(1)
- * Club domestic league appearances and goals as of 25 December 2018

Mihail Kanstantsinavich Harbachow (Belarusian: Міхаіл Канстанцінавіч Гарбачоў; Russian: Михаил Горбачёв (Mikhail Gorbachev); born 29 July 1983) is a Belarusian former professional footballer.

In July 2020 Harbachow was found guilty of being involved in a match-fixing schema in Belarusian league. He was sentenced to 2 years of house arrest and banned from Belarusian football for life.

== Honours ==
Belshina Bobruisk

- Belarusian Premier League champion: 2001

Naftan Novopolotsk

- Belarusian Cup winner: 2008–09, 2011–12
