= 2011 Belarusian Premier League =

Belarusian Premier League
- Season: 2011
- Champions: BATE Borisov; 8th title
- Relegated: Dnepr Mogilev; Vitebsk
- Champions League: BATE Borisov
- Europa League: Naftan; Shakhtyor; Gomel
- Matches: 198
- Goals: 460 (2.32 per match)
- Biggest home win: Naftan 6–0 Dnepr
- Biggest away win: Dnepr 0–4 Shakhtyor
- Highest scoring: D. Minsk 3–4 Minsk
- Longest winning run: BATE (6 games)
- Longest unbeaten run: BATE (14 games)
- Longest winless run: Dinamo Brest, Neman (11 games each)
- Longest losing run: Dinamo Brest, Dnepr, Naftan, Neman (4 games each)

The 2011 Belarusian Premier League was the 21st season of top-tier football in Belarus. It began in April and ended in November 2011. BATE Borisov were the defending champions.

== Teams ==
Locations of teams in the 2011 Belarusian Premier League

Partizan Minsk were relegated to the Belarusian First League after finishing the 2010 season in last place, ending a seven-year tenure in the league. They were replaced by 2010 First League champions Gomel, who make their immediate return to the highest football league of Belarus. Torpedo Zhodino as 11th-placed team had to compete in the relegation/promotion playoffs against First League runners-up SKVICH Minsk. They successfully retained their Premier League spot after defeating SKVICH 3–1 on aggregate. In early 2011 they were renamed to Torpedo-BelAZ Zhodino.

=== Team summaries ===
Team	Location	Venue	Capacity	Position in 2010
BATE	Borisov	City Stadium	5,402	1
Belshina	Bobruisk	Spartak Stadium (Bobruisk)	3,700	6
Dinamo Brest	Brest	OSK Brestskiy	10,060	5
Dinamo Minsk	Minsk	Dinamo-Yuni Stadium	4,500	4
Dnepr	Mogilev	Spartak Stadium (Mogilev)	7,350	8
Gomel	Gomel	Central Stadium	14,307	First League, 1
Minsk	Minsk	Torpedo Stadium (Minsk)	1,650	3
Naftan	Novopolotsk	Atlant Stadium	4,500	7
Neman	Grodno	Neman Stadium	8,500	10
Shakhtyor	Soligorsk	Stroitel Stadium	4,200	2
Torpedo-BelAZ	Zhodino	Torpedo Stadium (Zhodino)	3,020	11
Vitebsk	Vitebsk	Vitebsky CSK	8,350	9

1. One game played at Spartak Stadium in Mogilev.
2. Two games played at Dinamo Stadium and one at Traktor Stadium.
3. One game played at Yunost Stadium in Mozyr.
4. Six games played at Dinamo Stadium, two games at Dinamo-Yuni Stadium and one at Traktor Stadium.
5. Two games played at Vitebsky CSK in Vitebsk.

== League table ==
Pos	Team	Pld	W	D	L	GF	GA	GD	Pts	Qualification or relegation
1	BATE Borisov (C)	33	18	12	3	53	20	+33	66	Qualification for Champions League second qualifying round
2	Shakhtyor Soligorsk	33	17	10	6	46	24	+22	61	Qualification for Europa League second qualifying round
3	Gomel	33	13	15	5	36	24	+12	54	Qualification for Europa League first qualifying round
4	Dinamo Minsk	33	14	7	12	50	43	+7	49	
5	Belshina Bobruisk	33	12	12	9	41	35	+6	48	
6	Torpedo-BelAZ Zhodino	33	9	14	10	37	41	−4	41	
7	Naftan Novopolotsk	33	10	7	16	35	45	−10	37	Qualification for Europa League second qualifying round (Note: Winners of 2011–12 Belarusian Cup will qualify for the second qualifying round of UEFA Europa League)
8	Neman Grodno	33	8	13	12	33	45	−12	37	
9	Minsk	33	8	11	14	33	40	−7	35	
10	Dinamo Brest	33	8	11	14	38	46	−8	35	
11	Vitebsk (R)	33	8	8	17	29	46	−17	32	Qualification to relegation play-offs
12	Dnepr Mogilev (R)	33	6	14	13	29	51	−22	32	Relegation to Belarusian First League

Source: football.by
Rules for classification: 1st points; 2nd matches won; 3rd head-to-head (points, matches won, goal difference, goals scored); 4th goal difference; 5th goals scored
(C) Champions; (R) Relegated

=== Relegation playoffs ===
Vitebsk will play a two-legged relegation play-off against Partizan Minsk, the runners-up of the 2011 Belarusian First League for one spot in the 2012 Premier League.

1 December 2011
13:00 GMT+3

Partizan Minsk	2 – 0	Vitebsk
Shapyatowski 73'; Makas 89'

Traktor Stadium, Minsk
Attendance: 600

4 December 2011
12:00 GMT+3

Vitebsk	2 – 1	Partizan Minsk
Sļesarčuks 27'; Skitaw 55'		Makas 30' (pen.)

CSK Vitebsky, Vitebsk
Attendance: 2,000

== Results ==
Each team will play three times against every other team for a total of 33 matches.

=== First and second round ===
Home \ Away	BAT	BSH	DBR	DMI	DNE	GOM	MIN	NAF	NEM	SHA	TZH	VIT
BATE Borisov		1–0	2–0	1–0	5–0	1–1	1–1	1–0	1–1	2–2	1–0	4–1
Belshina Bobruisk	0–2		1–1	2–3	2–2	1–0	2–2	0–0	1–1	2–0	2–2	2–0
Dinamo Brest	0–3	1–4		2–0	2–0	1–2	2–2	1–3	1–1	4–0	1–3	3–0
Dinamo Minsk	2–0	3–1	1–1		2–0	0–0	1–2	0–1	0–1	0–2	0–1	2–2
Dnepr Mogilev	1–1	2–2	1–1	0–1		0–0	0–2	1–2	1–1	0–1	3–1	0–0
Gomel	0–0	3–1	2–0	5–1	2–1		2–1	0–1	1–0	0–0	0–0	2–2
Minsk	1–0	1–2	1–1	0–0	1–3	2–1		1–3	3–1	0–1	0–1	1–3
Naftan Novopolotsk	0–2	1–0	1–1	1–4	6–0	1–1	0–0		1–2	1–1	0–2	1–1
Neman Grodno	0–3	2–0	2–3	0–2	1–1	0–0	0–1	4–2		0–1	2–2	0–1
Shakhtyor Soligorsk	0–2	0–0	2–0	1–3	2–2	1–1	1–0	3–0	5–0		1–0	1–0
Torpedo-BelAZ Zhodino	0–3	0–1	1–1	1–0	1–1	1–1	2–2	3–2	2–2	1–0		0–3
Vitebsk	0–1	0–1	2–1	1–3	0–2	1–0	1–0	0–1	0–1	0–2	1–1	

Source: football.by
Legend: Blue = home team win; Yellow = draw; Red = away team win.

=== Third round ===
Home \ Away	BAT	BSH	DBR	DMI	DNE	GOM	MIN	NAF	NEM	SHA	TZH	VIT
BATE Borisov				2–2	1–2	0–0		2–0			4–2	2–2
Belshina Bobruisk	1–1		1–0			0–0			2–3	0–2	1–1	
Dinamo Brest	1–1			1–1		0–2		0–1	3–0			
Dinamo Minsk		0–3			4–1		3–4			3–2		2–0
Dnepr Mogilev		0–0	0–2				1–0			0–4		1–0
Gomel				2–1	1–1		1–0	1–0			1–0	2–0
Minsk	0–2	0–1	1–1						0–0	1–1	0–0	
Naftan Novopolotsk		1–2		1–3	1–0		1–3					1–1
Neman Grodno	0–1			1–2	1–1	2–2		1–0			0–0	
Shakhtyor Soligorsk	0–0		1–0			4–0		1–0	0–0			
Torpedo-BelAZ Zhodino			1–2	1–1	1–1			3–1		1–3		
Vitebsk		0–3	3–0				1–0		2–3	1–1	0–2	

Source: football.by
Legend: Blue = home team win; Yellow = draw; Red = away team win.

== Top goalscorers ==
Rank	Goalscorer	Team	Goals
1	(Brazil) Renan Bressan	BATE Borisov	13
2	(Belarus) Yahor Zubovich	Belshina Bobruisk	11
2	(Belarus) Artsyom Salavey	Torpedo-BelAZ Zhodino	11
2	(Brazil) Bruno Furlan	Dinamo Minsk	11
5	(Belarus) Dzmitry Kowb	Belshina Bobruisk	10
5	(Ukraine) Maksym Lisovyi	Belshina Bobruisk, Gomel	10
7	(Belarus) Ihar Zyankovich	Dnepr Mogilev	9
7	(Russia) Aleksandr Alumona	Shakhtyor Soligorsk	9
9	(Belarus) Pavel Sitko	Shakhtyor Soligorsk	8
9	(Belarus) Dzmitry Kamarowski	Shakhtyor Soligorsk	8
9	(Belarus) Raman Vasilyuk	Minsk	8
9	(Brazil) David Lazari	Dinamo Brest	8
9	(Ukraine) Ihor Kryvobok	Torpedo-BelAZ Zhodino	8

Updated to games played on 27 November 2011
Source: football.by

== Awards ==
=== Player of the month ===
Month	Player	Team	Notes
April	(Belarus) Igor Shitov	BATE Borisov	
May	(Belarus) Ihar Stasevich	Gomel	
June	(Belarus) Yury Tsyhalka	Shakhtyor Soligorsk	
July	(Belarus) Pavel Nekhaychik	BATE Borisov	
August	(Belarus) Artsyom Salavey	Torpedo-BelAZ Zhodino	
September	(Brazil) David Lazari	Dinamo Brest	
October	(Brazil) Renan Bressan	BATE Borisov	
November	(Belarus) Dzmitry Kamarowski	Shakhtyor Soligorsk	

== See also ==
- 2011 Belarusian First League
- 2010–11 Belarusian Cup
