= Valery Zhukovsky =

Belarusian footballer

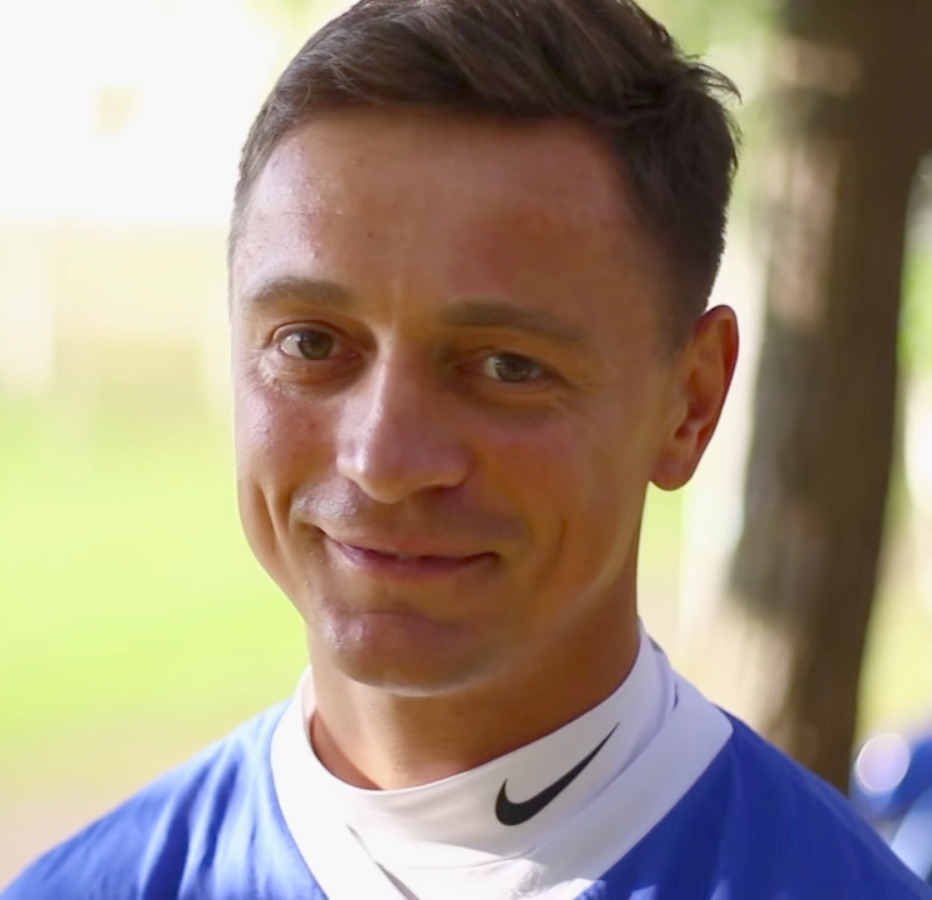
- Zhukovsky in 2016

Personal information
- Full name: Valery Frantsevich Zhukovsky
- Date of birth: 21 May 1984 (age 42)
- Place of birth: Lida, Grodno Oblast, Belarusian SSR
- Height: 1.76 m (5 ft 9 1/2 in)
- Position: Midfielder

Team information
- Current team: Maxline Vitebsk
- Number: 51

Youth career
- Lida

Senior career*
Years	Team	Apps	(Gls)
2001–2005	Lida	63	(11)
2006–2007	Belshina Bobruisk	38	(10)
2007–2009	Shakhtyor Soligorsk	53	(7)
2009–2012	Naftan Novopolotsk	99	(11)
2013	Gomel	16	(2)
2014–2015	Naftan Novopolotsk	57	(11)
2016	Dinamo Minsk	19	(2)
2017–2023	Neman Grodno	150	(27)
2023–	Maxline Vitebsk	14	(3)
- * Club domestic league appearances and goals as of 31 December 2023

Valery Frantsevich Zhukovsky (Belarusian: Валерый Францавіч Жукоўскі; Russian: Валерий Францевич Жуковский; born 21 May 1984) is a Belarusian professional footballer who plays for Maxline Vitebsk.

== Honours ==
Naftan Novopolotsk

- Belarusian Cup winner: 2011–12
