= Aleh Shkabara =

Belarusian footballer (born 1983)

Personal information
- Date of birth: 15 February 1983 (age 43)
- Place of birth: Minsk, Soviet Union
- Height: 1.76 m (5 ft 9 1/2 in)
- Position: Midfielder

Youth career
- SDYuShOR-5 Minsk

Senior career*
Years	Team	Apps	(Gls)
2000	Traktor Minsk	15	(2)
2001–2005	Dynamo Moscow	19	(0)
2003–2004	→ BATE Borisov (loan)	53	(11)
2006–2007	Gomel	21	(1)
2007	→ Ural Sverdlovsk Oblast (loan)	25	(2)
2008–2010	Dinamo Minsk	50	(5)
2011–2016	Naftan Novopolotsk	120	(9)
2017	Smolevichi-STI	25	(1)
2018	Sputnik Rechitsa	11	(2)
2018–2019	Molodechno	6	(0)

International career
2000–2001	Belarus U-19	6	(1)
2002–2005	Belarus U-21	31	(5)
2004	Belarus Olympic	2	(0)
2004–2006	Belarus	5	(2)
- * Club domestic league appearances and goals as of 31 December 2019

Aleh Shkabara (Belarusian: Алег Шкабара; Russian: Олег Шкабара; born 15 February 1983) is a Belarusian former footballer.

== Honours ==
Naftan Novopolotsk

- Belarusian Cup winner: 2011–12

== International goals ==
#	Date	Venue	Opponent	Score	Result	Competition
1	22 November 2004	Mohammed Bin Zayed Stadium, Abu Dhabi, United Arab Emirates	United Arab Emirates	1 – 1	3–2	Friendly
2	1 March 2006	Pafiako Stadium, Paphos, Cyprus	Finland	2 – 0	2–2	Cyprus International Football Tournament
