= Dmitry Sholudko =

Belarusian footballer

Personal information
- Date of birth: 17 August 1989 (age 37)
- Place of birth: Donetsk, Rostov Oblast, Russian SFSR
- Height: 1.83 m (6 ft 0 in)
- Position: Forward

Senior career*
Years	Team	Apps	(Gls)
2009	Rudensk	14	(2)
2010	Isloch Minsk Raion		
2011	Rudensk	23	(4)
2012	Torpedo-BelAZ Zhodino	5	(0)
2013–2014	Bereza-2010	35	(8)
2015	Viktoriya Maryina Gorka	1	(0)
- * Club domestic league appearances and goals as of 1 December 2015

Dmitry Sholudko (Belarusian: Дзмітрый Шалудзька; Russian: Дмитрий Шолудько; born 17 August 1989) is a Belarusian former professional footballer.
