= Alyaksandr Hawrushka =

Belarusian footballer

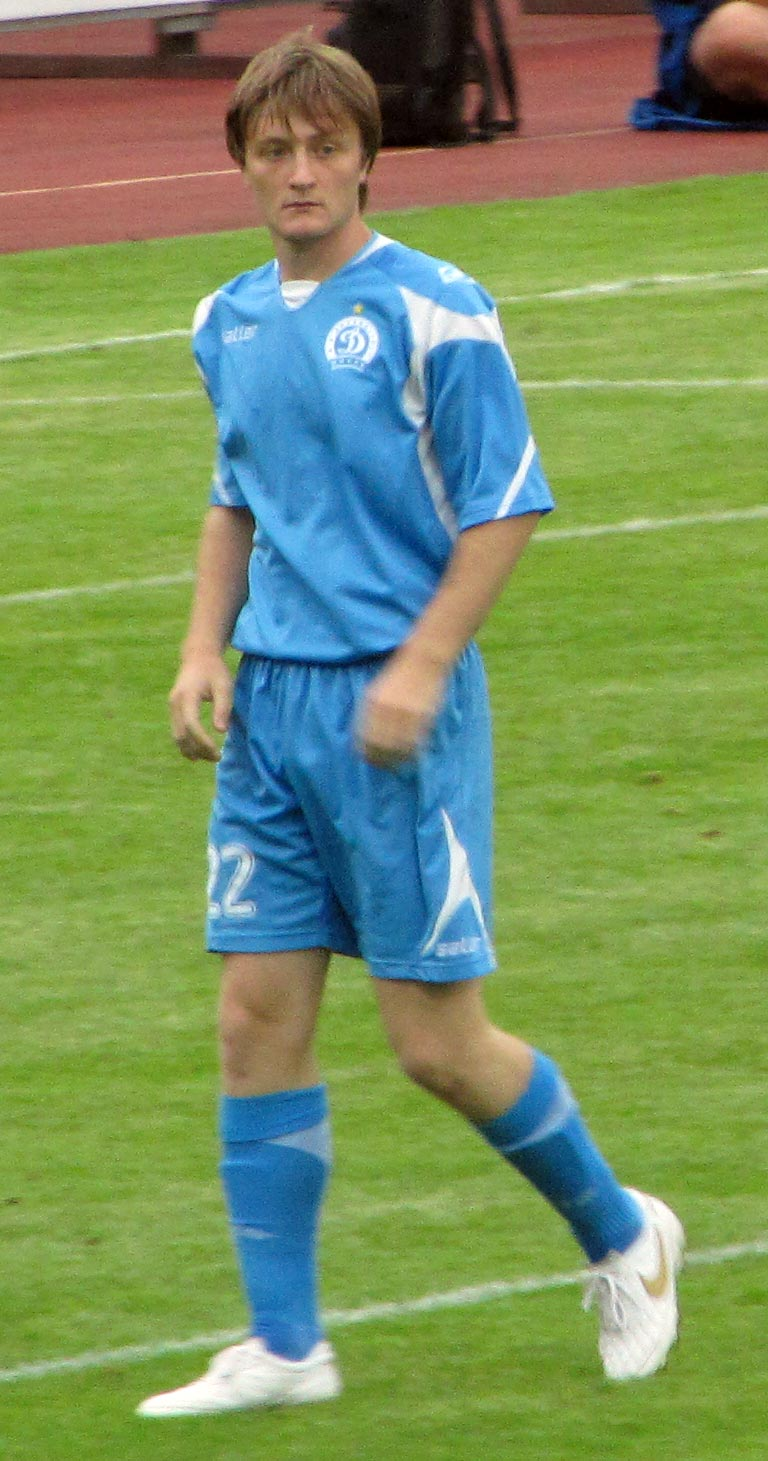

Personal information
- Date of birth: 23 January 1986 (age 40)
- Place of birth: Potsdam, East Germany
- Height: 1.85 m (6 ft 1 in)
- Position: Forward

Youth career
- 2003–2005: Dnepr-Transmash Mogilev

Senior career*
Years	Team	Apps	(Gls)
2004–2008	Dnepr Mogilev	84	(28)
2009–2010	Dinamo Minsk	36	(9)
2010	→ Naftan Novopolotsk (loan)	14	(5)
2011–2012	Naftan Novopolotsk	53	(7)
2013	Belshina Bobruisk	29	(5)
2014	Dnepr Mogilev	31	(6)
2015	Slutsk	2	(0)
2016	Dnepr Mogilev	21	(2)
2017	Orsha	8	(2)

International career
2006–2009	Belarus U21	4	(1)
- * Club domestic league appearances and goals as of 12 December 2017

Alyaksandr Yawhenavich Hawrushka (Belarusian: Аляксандр Яўгенавіч Гаўрушка; Russian: Александр Гаврюшко (Aleksandr Gavryushko); born 23 January 1986) is a Belarusian former professional footballer.

== Honours ==
Naftan Novopolotsk

- Belarusian Cup winner: 2011–12
