= Anatol Karp =

Belarusian footballer

Personal information
- Date of birth: 2 October 1992 (age 34)
- Place of birth: Minsk, Belarus
- Height: 1.84 m (6 ft 1/2 in)
- Position: Midfielder

Youth career
- 2008–2009: MTZ-RIPO Minsk

Senior career*
Years	Team	Apps	(Gls)
2010–2011	Partizan Minsk	23	(0)
2012	Shakhtyor Soligorsk	0	(0)
2013–2015	Zvezda-BGU Minsk	80	(2)
- * Club domestic league appearances and goals as of 1 December 2015

Anatol Karp (Belarusian: Анатоль Карп; Russian: Анатолий Карп; born 2 October 1992) is a Belarusian former professional football player.
