= Elvin Aliyev (footballer, born 2000) =

Azerbaijani professional footballer

Personal information
- Full name: Elvin Mohhubat oglu Aliyev
- Date of birth: 26 June 2000 (age 26)
- Place of birth: Novopolotsk, Vitebsk Oblast, Belarus
- Position: Forward

Team information
- Current team: Polotsk
- Number: 16

Youth career
- 2017–2018: Naftan Novopolotsk

Senior career*
Years	Team	Apps	(Gls)
2018–2021	Naftan Novopolotsk	77	(1)
2022–	Polotsk	26	(19)
- * Club domestic league appearances and goals as of 31 December 2023

Elvin Aliyev (Azerbaijani: Elvin Möhhubat oğlu Əliyev; born 26 June 2000) is an Azerbaijani professional footballer who currently plays for Polotsk in the Belarusian Second League.

== International career ==
Aliyev was called up for the Azerbaijan U19 on 4 October 2018.
