= Uladzimir Marhulets =

Belarusian footballer

Personal information
- Date of birth: 15 January 1984 (age 42)
- Position: Midfielder

Youth career
- 2001–2004: Dinamo Minsk

Senior career*
Years	Team	Apps	(Gls)
2001	Dinamo-2 Minsk	32	(2)
2002–2004	Dinamo-Juni Minsk	85	(4)
2005–2009	Smorgon	90	(10)
2010–2011	Granit Mikashevichi	53	(4)
2012	SKVICH Minsk	23	(1)
2013	Slonim	6	(0)
2013–2014	Isloch Minsk Raion	14	(1)
- * Club domestic league appearances and goals as of 1 December 2014

Uladzimir Marhulets (Belarusian: Уладзімір Маргулец; Russian: Владимир Маргулец; born 15 January 1984) is a retired Belarusian professional footballer.
