= Maryina Horka =

Town in Minsk Region, Belarus

Maryina Horka Мар'іна Горка (Belarusian) Марьина Горка (Russian) Maryina Gorka
- Town
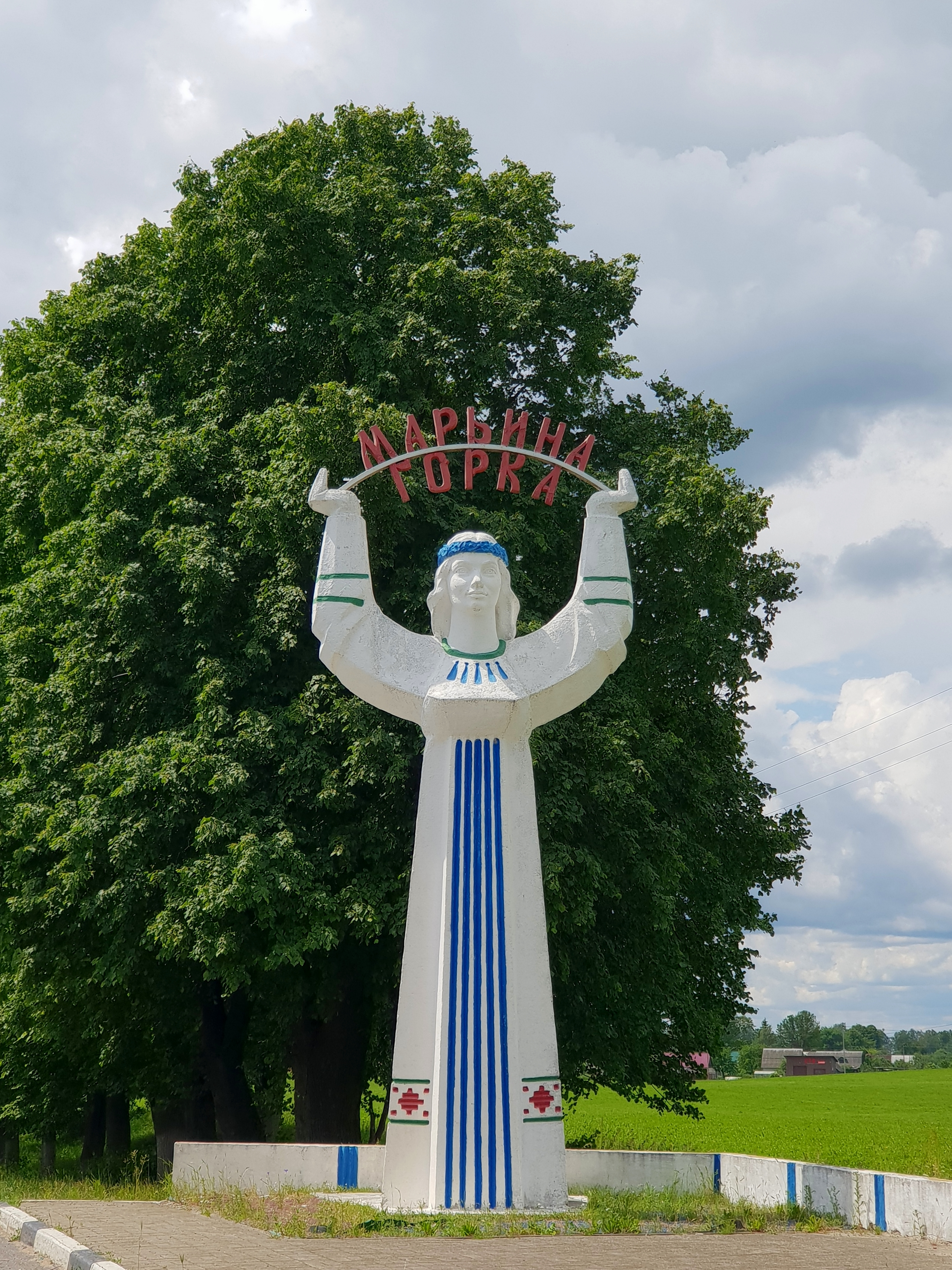
- Monument of Maria – a symbol of Maryina Horka

- Flag Coat of arms

- Location within Belarus
- Coordinates: 53°30′25.92″N 28°09′07.92″E
- Country: Belarus
- Region: Minsk Region
- District: Pukhavichy District
- Founded: 1222
- Town rights: 22 July 1955

Area
  - Total: 8.2 km^{2} (3.2 sq mi)
- Elevation: 169 m (554 ft)

Population (2026)
  - Total: 19,892
  - Density: 2,400/km^{2} (6,300/sq mi)
- Time zone: UTC+3 (MSK)
- Postal code: 222811
- Area code: +375 1713
- License plate: 5
- Website: Official website

Maryina Horka or Maryina Gorka (Note: Belarusian: Мар'іна Горка, romanized: Marjina Gorka; Russian: Марьина Горка; Polish: Maryjna Górka.) is a town in Minsk Region, in central Belarus. It serves as the administrative center of Pukhavichy District. In 2009, its population was 22,500. As of 2026, it has a population of 19,892.

Maryina Horka is located 60 kilometres (37 mi) south of Minsk. It is traversed by the M5 highway, between Minsk and Babruysk. The city is crossed by highways R59 (Logoisk - Smolevichi - Maryina Gorka), R68 (Pukhovichi - Uzda - Negoreloye), and R92 (Maryina Gorka - Starye Dorogi). Pukhovichi station is located on the Minsk-Gomel railway line.

== History ==
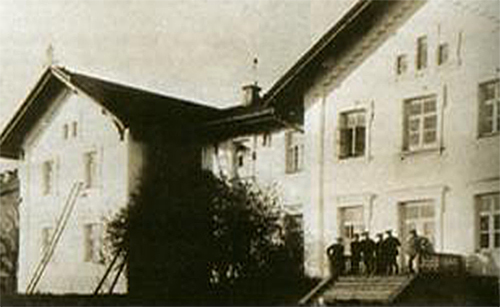
Agricultural college in 1914

The town was first mentioned in 1222 and received its town status in 1955. It was a possession of the Burzyński, Ratyński and Krupski noble families until 1863.

The 5th Spetsnaz Brigade, first of the Soviet Spetsnaz GRU, now of the Armed Forces of Belarus, has been located in Marjina Horka since 1963.

== Attractions ==
One of the city's most famous landmarks is the Makov's manor house. It existed since the 16th century. After the 1863 uprising, the manor house was confiscated and became the property of Lev Makov, Minister of Internal Affairs of the Russian Empire. Under his rule, the red brick manor house was built in 1876. The estate underwent several major renovations. The park, which was laid out nearby, underwent significant changes; only part of it remains. From 1935 to 1941, the building housed the House of Belarusian Writers, where classics of Belarusian literature such as Yanka Kupala, Yakub Kolas, Zmitrok Byadulya, and Kuzma Chorny once relaxed and wrote. The manor house now houses a medical facility .

== Media ==
The local newspaper is "Puchavičy naviny" " (Belarusian: Пухавіцкія навіны). The newspaper is published since May 1, 1931 on Wednesdays and Saturdays. The circulation of the newspaper is 4,540 copies.

The advertising newspaper is "Region" (Russian: Регион). The newspaper is published since June 13, 2000 on Wednesdays and Saturdays. The circulation of the newspaper is 10,000 copies.

== Education ==
Maryina Horka is home to:

- Agrarian and Technical College named after V.Y. Lobanok.

== Climate ==
Climate data for Maryina Horka (1991–2020)
Month	Jan	Feb	Mar	Apr	May	Jun	Jul	Aug	Sep	Oct	Nov	Dec	Year
Record high °C (°F)	11.0 (51.8)	14.0 (57.2)	25.3 (77.5)	28.2 (82.8)	31.4 (88.5)	36.3 (97.3)	36.5 (97.7)	36.5 (97.7)	33.1 (91.6)	25.5 (77.9)	19.0 (66.2)	11.1 (52.0)	36.5 (97.7)
Mean daily maximum °C (°F)	−1.8 (28.8)	−0.5 (31.1)	5.0 (41.0)	13.4 (56.1)	19.4 (66.9)	22.9 (73.2)	24.9 (76.8)	24.1 (75.4)	18.1 (64.6)	10.9 (51.6)	3.9 (39.0)	−0.4 (31.3)	11.7 (53.1)
Daily mean °C (°F)	−4.2 (24.4)	−3.5 (25.7)	0.9 (33.6)	8.0 (46.4)	13.6 (56.5)	17.2 (63.0)	19.1 (66.4)	18.1 (64.6)	12.8 (55.0)	6.9 (44.4)	1.5 (34.7)	−2.6 (27.3)	7.3 (45.1)
Mean daily minimum °C (°F)	−6.8 (19.8)	−6.3 (20.7)	−2.7 (27.1)	3.0 (37.4)	8.0 (46.4)	11.7 (53.1)	13.6 (56.5)	12.6 (54.7)	8.2 (46.8)	3.4 (38.1)	−0.7 (30.7)	−4.9 (23.2)	3.3 (37.9)
Record low °C (°F)	−20.5 (−4.9)	−18.1 (−0.6)	−11.8 (10.8)	−3.9 (25.0)	0.5 (32.9)	5.1 (41.2)	8.4 (47.1)	6.2 (43.2)	0.7 (33.3)	−4.5 (23.9)	−9.9 (14.2)	−15.5 (4.1)	−20.5 (−4.9)
Average precipitation mm (inches)	38.9 (1.53)	34.0 (1.34)	35.9 (1.41)	37.0 (1.46)	59.9 (2.36)	69.8 (2.75)	89.9 (3.54)	63.0 (2.48)	45.6 (1.80)	50.6 (1.99)	42.7 (1.68)	40.2 (1.58)	607.5 (23.92)
Average precipitation days (≥ 1.0 mm)	9.9	9.2	8.6	6.9	9.1	10.3	10.9	8.0	7.7	8.6	9.2	10.1	108.5
Mean monthly sunshine hours	36.9	61.0	133.8	199.2	256.3	279.5	283.5	258.9	172.0	99.8	33.3	27.9	1,842.1
Source: NOAA Source 2: http://www.pogodaiklimat.ru/weather.php?id=26855&bday=3&fday=3&amonth=8&ayear=2014&bot=2

== See also ==
- FC Rudensk
