= Kirill Shreitor =

Belarusian footballer

Personal information
- Date of birth: 6 August 1986 (age 40)
- Place of birth: Pinsk, Byelorussian SSR, Soviet Union
- Height: 1.89 m (6 ft 2 1/2 in)
- Position: Forward

Youth career
- 2003–2005: Dinamo Brest

Senior career*
| Years | Team | Apps | (Gls) |
| 2005–2006 | Dinamo Brest | 2 | (0) |
| 2006–2009 | Volna Pinsk | 79 | (17) |
| 2010–2011 | Granit Mikashevichi | 56 | (24) |
| 2012 | Dinamo Brest | 12 | (0) |
| 2012 | Gorodeya | 8 | (1) |
| 2013 | Slutsk | 25 | (5) |
| 2014 | Elana Toruń | 12 | (5) |
| 2014 | Lida | 13 | (6) |
| 2015–2016 | Gomelzheldortrans | 38 | (14) |
| 2016 | Belshina Bobruisk | 14 | (3) |
| 2017 | Nevėžis | 10 | (1) |
| 2017 | Baranovichi | 14 | (4) |
| 2018 | Lida | 7 | (1) |
| 2018 | UAS Zhitkovichi | 13 | (3) |
| 2019 | Sputnik Rechitsa | 12 | (1) |
| 2019–2020 | Baranovichi | 33 | (15) |
| 2022–2023 | Nadezhda Baranovichi Raion | 2 | (1) |
- * Club domestic league appearances and goals

Kirill Shreitor (Belarusian: Кірыл Шрэйтар; Russian: Кирилл Шрейтор; born 6 August 1986) is a Belarusian former professional footballer who played as a forward.

== Career ==
Before 2017 season, Shreitor joined Lithuanian I Lyga side Nevėžis. He made his debut for the club on 1 April 2017 after being substituted in the second tour match against Tauras. Player was released by the club on 5 July 2017.
