= Uladzimir Shakaw =

Belarusian footballer

Personal information
- Date of birth: 28 August 1984 (age 42)
- Place of birth: Polotsk, Belarusian SSR
- Height: 1.89 m (6 ft 2 1/2 in)
- Position: Forward

Youth career
- 2001–2002: Naftan Novopolotsk

Senior career*
Years	Team	Apps	(Gls)
2002–2005	Naftan Novopolotsk	24	(0)
2004	→ Polotsk (loan)	9	(2)
2005	→ Polotsk (loan)	13	(3)
2006–2008	Savit Mogilev	66	(48)
2008	Torpedo Zhodino	13	(2)
2009	Vitebsk	23	(6)
2010	Naftan Novopolotsk	22	(4)
2011	SKVICH Minsk	29	(16)
2012	Dnepr Mogilev	16	(6)
2012	Gorodeya	12	(5)
2013	Slutsk	29	(9)
2014	Vitebsk	25	(7)
2015–2016	Slonim	45	(20)
2017–2019	Polotskgaz		
2020	Polotsk	1	(4)
2021	Lepel	4	(3)
2023	Polotsk	2	(0)
- * Club domestic league appearances and goals as of 31 December 2023

Uladzimir Shakaw (Belarusian: Уладзімір Шакаў; Russian: Владимир Шаков; born 28 August 1984) is a Belarusian professional footballer.
