= Andrey Razin (footballer) =

Belarusian footballer and coach

Personal information
- Date of birth: 12 August 1979 (age 47)
- Place of birth: Brest, Belarusian SSR
- Height: 1.76 m (5 ft 9 1/2 in)
- Position: Midfielder

Youth career
- 1995–1998: Dinamo Brest

Senior career*
| Years | Team | Apps | (Gls) |
| 1996 | Beloozyorsk | 26 | (9) |
| 1997–1999 | Dinamo Brest | 57 | (13) |
| 2000–2002 | Dinamo Minsk | 55 | (6) |
| 2003 | Torpedo-SKA Minsk | 25 | (4) |
| 2004–2005 | Dinamo Minsk | 45 | (19) |
| 2006 | Anzhi Makhachkala | 22 | (0) |
| 2006 | Enköping | 6 | (0) |
| 2007 | Darida Minsk Raion | 11 | (2) |
| 2007–2008 | Zvezda Irkutsk | 40 | (5) |
| 2009–2014 | Minsk | 133 | (34) |
| 2014 | → Minsk-2 | 23 | (6) |
| Total | | 443 | (98) |

International career
| 2000–2001 | Belarus U21 | 9 | (0) |

Managerial career
- 2014–2019: Minsk (assistant)
- 2019–2020: Minsk
- * Club domestic league appearances and goals

Andrey Razin (Belarusian: Андрэй Разін; Russian: Андрей Александрович Разин; born 12 August 1979) is a Belarusian professional football coach and former player.

== Honours ==
Dinamo Minsk

- Belarusian Premier League champion: 2004
- Belarusian Cup champion: 2002–03

Minsk

- Belarusian Cup champion: 2012–13
