= Yuri Korolyuk =

Belarusian footballer

Personal information
- Date of birth: 10 January 1990 (age 36)
- Place of birth: Brest, Belarusian SSR
- Height: 1.86 m (6 ft 1 in)
- Position: Midfielder

Youth career
- 2007–2009: Dinamo Brest

Senior career*
| Years | Team | Apps | (Gls) |
| 2008–2010 | Dinamo Brest | 6 | (0) |
| 2010–2011 | Volna Pinsk | 32 | (21) |
| 2012–2013 | Torpedo-BelAZ Zhodino | 7 | (0) |
| 2012 | → Granit Mikashevichi (loan) | 12 | (4) |
| 2013 | Volna Pinsk | 11 | (3) |
| 2014 | Kobrin | 6 | (0) |
| 2014 | Volna Pinsk | 8 | (0) |

International career
| 2011–2012 | Belarus U21 | 3 | (0) |
- * Club domestic league appearances and goals as of 1 December 2014

Yuri Korolyuk (Belarusian: Юрый Каралюк; Russian: Юрий Королюк; born 10 January 1990) is a Belarusian former professional football player.
