= Roman Volkov =

Belarusian footballer

Personal information
- Date of birth: 8 January 1987 (age 39)
- Place of birth: Novopolotsk, Vitebsk Oblast, Belarusian SSR
- Height: 1.86 m (6 ft 1 in)
- Position: Forward

Youth career
- Lokomotiv Minsk

Senior career*
| Years | Team | Apps | (Gls) |
| 2004–2005 | Lokomotiv Minsk | 16 | (3) |
| 2006–2007 | Naftan Novopolotsk | 12 | (1) |
| 2008 | Granit Mikashevichi | 10 | (1) |
| 2009 | Belshina Bobruisk | 13 | (4) |
| 2009 | Slavia Mozyr | 13 | (8) |
| 2010 | Volna Pinsk | 28 | (12) |
| 2011–2012 | Slavia Mozyr | 57 | (22) |
| 2013 | Minsk | 11 | (0) |
| 2013 | Slavia Mozyr | 13 | (3) |
| 2014 | Isloch Minsk Raion | 15 | (6) |
| 2014 | Granit Mikashevichi | 10 | (1) |
| 2015 | Naftan Novopolotsk | 18 | (8) |
| 2016–2017 | Vitebsk | 50 | (11) |
| 2018 | Gomel | 25 | (3) |
| 2019 | Gorodeya | 21 | (2) |
| 2020–2021 | Sfântul Gheorghe Suruceni | 30 | (12) |
| 2021 | Naftan Novopolotsk | 13 | (8) |
| 2022–2023 | Dnepr Mogilev | 27 | (6) |
- * Club domestic league appearances and goals as of 31 July 2023

Roman Volkov (Belarusian: Раман Волкаў; Russian: Роман Волков; born 8 January 1987) is a Belarusian former footballer.

== Honours ==
Minsk

- Belarusian Cup: 2012–13

Sfântul Gheorghe Suruceni

- Moldovan Cup: 2020–21
- Moldovan Super Cup: 2021
