= Ivan Dzenisevich =

Belarusian footballer

Personal information
- Date of birth: 9 November 1984 (age 42)
- Place of birth: Grodno, Byelorussian SSR, Soviet Union
- Height: 1.76 m (5 ft 9 1/2 in)
- Position: Midfielder

Youth career
- 2001–2003: Dinamo Minsk

Senior career*
Years	Team	Apps	(Gls)
2001	Dinamo-Juni Minsk	34	(7)
2004–2006	Darida Minsk Raion	59	(2)
2007–2009	Neman Grodno	61	(11)
2010	Shakhtyor Soligorsk	33	(8)
2011–2014	Neman Grodno	84	(16)
2014	Gorodeya	15	(2)
2015	Neman Grodno	4	(0)
2015–2016	Isloch Minsk Raion	38	(2)

International career
2005–2006	Belarus U21	11	(0)
- * Club domestic league appearances and goals as of 31 December 2016

Ivan Ivanavich Dzenisevich (Belarusian: Іван Iванавiч Дзенісевіч; Russian: Иван Иванович Денисевич; born 9 November 1984) is a Belarusian former professional footballer.

== Career ==
Born in Grodno, Dzenisevich began playing football in FC Dinamo Minsk's youth system. He didn't make an appearance for the senior team before moving to FC Darida Minsk Raion where he made his Belarusian Premier League debut in 2004.

In March 2017, Dzenisevich was one of several Isloch Minsk Raion players alleged to be involved in match fixing.

On 20 February 2018, the BFF banned Dzenisevich for 24 months for his involvement in the match fixing.
