= FC Klechesk Kletsk =

Klechesk Kletsk
- Full name: Football Club Klechesk Kletsk
- Founded: 2007
- Dissolved: 2012
- Ground: City Stadium, Kletsk
- Capacity: 2,200
- League: Belarusian Second League
- 2012: n/a (withdrew)

FC Klechesk Kletsk was a Belarusian football club based in Kletsk, Minsk Oblast.

== History ==
The team was founded in 2007. The name of the club derives from medieval name of its hometown Kletsk. After playing in Minsk Oblast championship for one season, they joined Belarusian Second League in 2008. In 2010, they finished in third place and were invited to First League as a replacement for disbanded Veras Nesvizh. The club returned to the Second League after one season due to lack of financing.

Midway through 2012 Second League season the club withdrew from the tournament and disbanded shortly afterwards.
