= FC Veras Nesvizh =

FC Veras
- Full name: Football Club Veras
- Founded: 1995
- Dissolved: 2011
- Ground: Urozhay Stadium
- Capacity: 2,224
- League: Belarusian First League
- 2010: 11th

Veras Nesvizh is a defunct Belarusian football club based in Nyasvizh, Minsk Region. The team played in Belarusian Second League and later in Belarusian First League from 1995 till 2010. In February 2011 Veras was disbanded due to a loss of main sponsor.
