= FC Belcard Grodno =

Belcard Grodno
- Full name: Football Club Belcard Grodno
- Founded: 1992 / 2006 (reformed)
- Dissolved: 1998 / 2012
- Ground: Neman Stadium (Secondary pitch)
- League: Belarusian Second League
- 2012: 9th

Belcard Grodno is a football club based in Grodno. Club's name is derived from BelCard plant in Grodno (specializing in cardan shaft production), which has been a primary sponsor of the club and its youth academy.

== History ==
The team was founded in 1992 as Kardan-Flyers Grodno. The team made its debut in Belarusian Second League in 1992–93 season. After a successful 1993–94 season the team was promoted to the First League, where they played until 1998. Before 1998 season, the team was renamed to Belcard Grodno. In 1999, Belcard merged with bigger local team Neman Grodno into Neman-Belcard Grodno. Their partnership ended in 2003.

Between 1999 and 2005 Belcard did not have a senior male team, but continued to participate in youth and women's competitions.

The senior team was reformed in early 2006 as Dinamo-Belcard Grodno rejoined Second League the same year. They immediately won the league and were promoted back to the First League, where they have been playing from 2007 onwards. In 2009, team's name was reverted to Belcard Grodno. In 2012, the club relegated back to the Second League, and after one season the senior team was once again disbanded. Since 2013, the club once again plays at the youth level and in women's league (as Niva-Belcard Grodno).

== League and Cup history ==
Season	Level	Pos	Pld	W	D	L	Goals	Points	Domestic Cup	Notes
1992–93	3rd	3	30	20	5	5	67–24	45	Round of 64	
1993–94	3rd	1	34	23	10	1	75–12	56	Round of 16	Promoted
1994–95	2nd	5	30	14	9	7	53–37	37	Round of 64	
1995	2nd	4	14	8	3	3	28–18	27	Round of 16	
1996	2nd	10	24	9	4	11	39–40	31	Round of 16	
1997	2nd	10	30	9	7	14	36–50	34	Round of 16	
1998	2nd	8	30	11	7	12	36–37	40	Round of 32	Relegated
1999									Round of 32	
2006	3rd	1	32	26	5	1	105–18	83		Promoted
2007	2nd	8	26	11	3	12	33–37	36	Round of 32	
2008	2nd	7	26	11	2	13	38–32	35	Round of 32	
2009	2nd	9	26	8	5	13	23–34	29	Round of 16	
2010	2nd	13	30	8	6	16	25–40	30	Round of 32	
2011	2nd	15	30	8	5	17	30–55	29	Round of 64	Relegated
2012	3rd								Round of 16	
