= FC Rudensk =

Rudensk
- Full name: FC Rudensk
- Founded: 2001
- Dissolved: 2012
- Ground: Maryina Horka, Belarus
- League: Belarusian First League
- 2012: 15th

FC Rudensk is a Belarusian football club. Though the team officially represents the town of Rudziensk (Rudensk), since their formation they play all their home matches in Marjina Horka, 22 kilometres (14 mi) from Rudensk.

== History ==
The team was founded in 2001 and joined Second League the same year. In 2002, it was relegated to 4th (amateur) level, where it stayed until 2008. In 2009 Rudensk returned the Second League, and after winning it, they made its debut in Belarusian First League in 2010. In 2012 Rudensk finished at the last place in the First league and disbanded at the end of the year.
