= FC Polotsk =

- Full name: Football Club Polotsk
- Founded: 2004; 2019
- Dissolved: 2014 (reformed)
- Ground: Spartak Stadium
- Capacity: 5,000
- Head Coach: Sergey Smolyakov
- League: Belarusian Second League
- 2020: 17th

FC Polotsk was a Belarusian professional football club based in Polotsk, Vitebsk Oblast, Belarus.

== History ==
The club was founded in 2004 and joined Belarusian Second League the same year. In 2006 they made their debut in Belarusian First League, where they stayed until 2013.

In September 2013, the club, struggling with financial troubles, announced its withdrawal from the league. They, however, were able to complete the season with youth players, finishing dead last after losing 15 games in a row. The club was officially dissolved in January 2014.

FC Polotsk was reformed in 2019 and rejoined Belarusian Second League in 2020.

== Current squad ==
As of October 2023

Note: Flags indicate national team as defined under FIFA eligibility rules; some limited exceptions apply. Players may hold more than one non-FIFA nationality.

No.	Pos.	Nation	Player
—	GK	(Belarus) BLR	Sergey Kovalchuk
—	GK	(Belarus) BLR	Artur Krivko
—	GK	(Belarus) BLR	Artem Kuzmin
—	GK	(Belarus) BLR	Anton Khatkovskiy
—	DF	(Belarus) BLR	Konstantin Bocharskiy
—	DF	(Republic of the Congo) CGO	Steven Dimina
—	DF	(Belarus) BLR	Yevgeniy Golenkov
—	DF	(Belarus) BLR	Stanislav Gronskiy
—	DF	(Belarus) BLR	Maksim Ischanko
—	DF	(Belarus) BLR	Artem Kamenny
—	DF	(Belarus) BLR	Vasiliy Peredereyev
—	DF	(Belarus) BLR	Uladzislaw Palyakow
—	DF	(Belarus) BLR	Igor Ponomarenko
—	DF	(Belarus) BLR	Aleksandr Proklin
—	DF	(Belarus) BLR	Maksim Tyukalo
—	MF	(Belarus) BLR	Kirill Amelchenko
—	MF	(Belarus) BLR	Roman Artyukh
—	MF	(Belarus) BLR	Artem Gorbatenko

No.	Pos.	Nation	Player
—	MF	(Belarus) BLR	Aleksandr Daletskiy
—	MF	(Belarus) BLR	Vladislav Katushenok
—	MF	(Belarus) BLR	Daniil Metelitsa
—	MF	(Russia) RUS	Levon Ovsepyan
—	MF	(Belarus) BLR	Nikolay Rozhnov
—	MF	(Belarus) BLR	Vladislav Suvorov
—	MF	(Belarus) BLR	Ilya Teplov
—	MF	(Belarus) BLR	Pavel Timofeyev
—	MF	(Belarus) BLR	Alyaksandr Filipenka
—	MF	(Belarus) BLR	Nikita Vasilevskiy
—	FW	(Belarus) BLR	Elvin Aliyev
—	FW	(Belarus) BLR	Alyaksandr Pyatrowski
—	FW	(Belarus) BLR	Matvey Savenok
—	FW	(Belarus) BLR	Yan Sivakov
—	FW	(Belarus) BLR	Sergey Smolyakov
—	FW	(Belarus) BLR	Aleksey Strashnev
—	FW	(Belarus) BLR	Saveliy Khoroshkin
—	FW	(Belarus) BLR	Uladzimir Shakaw
