= 2003–04 Belarusian Cup =

Tournament details
- Country: Belarus
- Teams: 36

Final positions
- Champions: Shakhtyor Soligorsk (1st title)
- Runners-up: Gomel

Tournament statistics
- Matches played: 37
- Goals scored: 109 (2.95 per match)
- Top goal scorer(s): Artsyom Hancharyk; Dmitry Rubnenko; Anatoly Tikhonchik (4 goals)

The 2003–04 Belarusian Cup was the 13th season of the Belarusian annual football cup competition. Contrary to the league season, it has been conducted in a fall-spring rhythm. The first games were played on 4 June 2003 and the final on 16 May 2004. Shakhtyor Soligorsk won the Cup and qualified for the UEFA Cup first qualifying round.

== First round ==
In this round 8 clubs from Second League were drawn against 8 clubs from First League. Another four First League teams (Torpedo-Kadino Mogilev, Lokomotiv Vitebsk, Pinsk-900 and MTZ-RIPO Minsk) advanced to the next round by drawing of lots. The rest of First and Second League teams (four from each) chose not to participate in this edition of the Cup for financial reasons.

4 June 2003	Kommunalnik Zhlobin (III)	1–2	Smorgon (II)	Zhlobin
	Gaev 22'		Khymanych 19' (pen.); Grabazdin 80'	Attendance: 2,500; Referee: Nikita Pyreyev (Minsk)

4 June 2003	Gomel-2 (III)	0–1 (a.e.t.)	Bereza (II)	Gomel
			Shved 100'	Attendance: 100; Referee: Dmitry Abushkevich (Mogilev)

4 June 2003	Livadiya Dzerzhinsk (III)	0–2	Vedrich-97 Rechitsa (II)	Dzerzhinsk
			Zabolotsky 23'; Eramchuk 42'	Attendance: 800; Referee: Vladimir Misyuchenko (Minsk)

4 June 2003	Baranovichi (III)	2–1	Dnepr-DUSSh-1 Rogachev (II)	Baranovichi
	Malyavko 34', 47'		An.Adamitsky 75'	Attendance: 5,500; Referee: Viktor Chernik (Mosty)

4 June 2003	Veras Nesvizh (III)	1–2 (a.e.t.)	Khimik Svetlogorsk (II)	Nesvizh
	Lagutko 71'		Jafarov 30'; Zhdanovich 110'	Attendance: 1,350; Referee: Gennadiy Yarets (Minsk)

4 June 2003	Zabudova Chist (III)	0–0 (a.e.t.) (4–2 p)	Kommunalnik Slonim (II)	Chist
				Attendance: 200; Referee: Dmitry Yevnevich (Minsk)

4 June 2003	Sozh Krichev (III)	0–4	Granit Mikashevichi (II)	Krichev
			Shushkevich 53'; Rapeika 58'; Komkov 86'; V.Bakhno 90' (pen.)	Attendance: 2,000; Referee: Aleksandr Skrob (Stolbtsy)

4 June 2003	Osipovichi (III)	1–1 (a.e.t.) (4–3 p)	Neman Mosty (II)	Osipovichi
	Ivchenko 75'		Kiturko 15'	Attendance: 500; Referee: Igor Kruk (Molodechno)

== Round of 32 ==
12 winners of previous round were joined by 16 clubs from Premier League. 4 of 16 Premier League clubs (Dnepr-Transmash Mogilev, Darida Minsk Raion, Lokomotiv Minsk, Gomel) advanced to the next round by drawing of lots. The games were played on 9 and 10 August 2003.

9 August 2003	Lokomotiv Vitebsk (II)	1–0	Slavia Mozyr	Vitebsk
17:00 UTC+3	Kolodin 77'			Stadium: Vitebsky CSK; Attendance: 2,500; Referee: Oleg Chikun (Stolbtsy)

9 August 2003	Baranovichi (III)	0–2	Shakhtyor Soligorsk	Baranovichi
17:00 UTC+3			Novik 72'; Bespansky 85'	Stadium: Lokomotiv Stadium; Attendance: 6,500; Referee: Andrey Zhukov (Minsk)

9 August 2003	Torpedo-Kadino Mogilev (II)	1–2	Naftan Novopolotsk	Mogilev
17:00 UTC+3	Mozolovsky 8'		Kakabadze 4'; Vekhtev 76'	Stadium: Torpedo Stadium; Attendance: 500; Referee: Mikhail Arkhipov (Zhodino)

9 August 2003	MTZ-RIPO Minsk (II)	3–2 (a.e.t.)	Torpedo-SKA Minsk	Minsk
17:00 UTC+3	Kuzmenok 70', 93'; Yevseychik 73'		Makar 45'; Kozak 90'	Stadium: Traktor Stadium; Attendance: 2,000; Referee: Aleksandr Chebykin (Minsk)

9 August 2003	Bereza (II)	0–2	Dinamo Minsk	Bereza
17:00 UTC+3			Baba Adamu 20'; U.Makowski 87'	Stadium: City Stadium; Attendance: 5,500; Referee: Yuriy Maistrov (Fanipol)

9 August 2003	Khimik Svetlogorsk (II)	4–2	Zvezda-VA-BGU Minsk	Svetlogorsk
17:00 UTC+3	Sidorenko 18'; Zhdanovich 21'; Shelukhin 57'; Razmyslovich 89'		Levitsky 37'; Shushkevich 77'	Stadium: Bumazhnik Stadium; Attendance: 500; Referee: Valeriy Yazevich (Lida)

9 August 2003	Vedrich-97 Rechitsa (II)	1–2	Neman Grodno	Rechitsa
18:00 UTC+3	Zabolotsky 59'		Nadziewski 47'; Boriseiko 49'	Stadium: Central Stadium; Attendance: 1,500; Referee: Nikolay Metelskiy (Minsk)

9 August 2003	Pinsk-900 (II)	0–4	Belshina Bobruisk	Pinsk
18:00 UTC+3			Hancharyk 34', 88'; Bychuk 52'; Borisik 85' (pen.)	Stadium: Pripyat Stadium; Attendance: 1,200; Referee: Yuriy Kuntsevich (Grodno)

9 August 2003	Smorgon (II)	1–4	Molodechno-2000	Smorgon
18:00 UTC+3	Karasev 68'		Vyshinsky 13'; Afanasevich 15'; Alhavik 26'; Vrublevsky 69'	Stadium: Yunost Stadium; Attendance: 3,000; Referee: Valery Vyalichka (Minsk)

9 August 2003	Granit Mikashevichi (II)	2–1	Dinamo Brest	Luninets
18:00 UTC+3	Starkow 76'; Myasnikovich 90'		Kavalyuk 37' (pen.)	Stadium: City Stadium; Attendance: 3,500; Referee: Vladimir Sukhovarov (Orsha)

9 August 2003	Osipovichi (III)	0–4	Torpedo Zhodino	Osipovichi
18:00 UTC+3			Sashcheka 50'; Markhel 89'; Vetoshkin 90'; Truhaw 90'	Stadium: Yunost Stadium; Attendance: 500; Referee: Aleksei Kulbakov (Gomel)

10 August 2003	Zabudova Chist (III)	0–4	BATE Borisov	Chist
18:00 UTC+3			Shkabara 50'; Kamarowski 58', 72'; Rubnenko 75'	Stadium: School Stadium; Attendance: 3,000; Referee: Aleksandr Ryomin (Minsk)

== Round of 16 ==
The games were played on 8 October 2003.

8 October 2003	Lokomotiv Minsk	1–0 (a.e.t.)	Granit Mikashevichi (II)	Minsk
15:00 UTC+3	Shumanov 104'			Stadium: Lokomotiv Stadium; Attendance: 500; Referee: Oleg Chikun (Stolbtsy)

8 October 2003	Shakhtyor Soligorsk	5–1	Molodechno-2000	Soligorsk
15:00 UTC+3	Sļesarčuks 19'; Boyka 30'; Syarohin 49'; Tikhonchik 88' (pen.), 90'		Khamutowski 43'	Stadium: Stroitel Stadium; Attendance: 1,500; Referee: Nikolay Metelskiy (Minsk)

8 October 2003	Naftan Novopolotsk	1–1 (a.e.t.) (4–3 p)	Torpedo Zhodino	Novopolotsk
15:00 UTC+3	Sednev 89'		Rodionov 66'	Stadium: Atlant Stadium; Attendance: 500; Referee: Georgiy Verbitsky (Slonim)
	Penalties
	Nevinsky (penalty scored); Kirenkin (penalty scored); Kuznyatsow (penalty scored); Kakabadze (penalty missed); Sednev (penalty scored)		(penalty scored) Palkin; (penalty scored) Dzegtseraw; (penalty scored) Sashcheka; (penalty missed) Sahakyan; (penalty missed) Vertinsky

8 October 2003	Lokomotiv Vitebsk (II)	1–0	Darida Minsk Raion	Vitebsk
15:45 UTC+3	Patsko 72'			Stadium: CSK Vitebsky; Attendance: 2,800; Referee: Valeriy Petrovich (Minsk)

8 October 2003	BATE Borisov	3–0	Belshina Bobruisk	Borisov
16:00 UTC+3	Byahanski 7'; Rubnenko 63'; Shkabara 64'			Stadium: City Stadium; Attendance: 1,700; Referee: Vladimir Sukhovarov (Orsha)

8 October 2003	Khimik Svetlogorsk (II)	0–1	Gomel	Svetlogorsk
16:00 UTC+3			Nikitenko 90'	Stadium: Bumazhnik Stadium; Attendance: 5,500; Referee: Andrey Zhukov (Minsk)

8 October 2003	Neman Grodno	2–0	MTZ-RIPO Minsk (II)	Grodno
16:30 UTC+3	Kavalyonak 47', 63'			Stadium: Neman Stadium; Attendance: 1,200; Referee: Sergey Shmolik (Brest)

8 October 2003	Dinamo Minsk	5–1	Dnepr-Transmash Mogilev	Minsk
18:00 UTC+3	Valadzyankow 8'; Baba Adamu 42'; Kornilenko 72', 77'; Kavalchuk 78' (pen.)		Pyschur 90'	Stadium: Dinamo Stadium; Attendance: 2,300; Referee: Mikhail Arkhipov (Zhodino)

== Quarterfinals ==
The games were played on 3 April 2004.

3 April 2004	Gomel	3–1	Lokomotiv Minsk (II)	Gomel
15:00 UTC+3	Khusyainov 6'; Zinovyev 16'; Bliznyuk 83'		Denisyuk 33'	Stadium: Luch Stadium; Attendance: 3,500; Referee: Yuriy Maistrov (Fanipol)

3 April 2004	Naftan Novopolotsk	1–0	Dinamo Minsk	Novopolotsk
15:00 UTC+3	Strypeykis 40'			Stadium: Atlant Stadium; Attendance: 5,500; Referee: Oleg Chikun (Stolbtsy)

3 April 2004	Neman Grodno	1–2	Shakhtyor Soligorsk	Grodno
16:00 UTC+3	Kavalyonak 22'		Hancharyk 52'; Tikhonchik 79'	Stadium: Neman Stadium; Attendance: 4,000; Referee: Aleksandr Chebykin (Minsk)

3 April 2004	BATE Borisov	3–0	Lokomotiv Vitebsk	Borisov
16:00 UTC+3	Rubnenko 4', 28'; Lashankow 58'			Stadium: City Stadium; Attendance: 3,800; Referee: Aleksei Kulbakov (Gomel)

== Semifinals ==
The first legs were played on 7 April 2004. The second legs were played on 11 April 2004.

Team 1	Agg.	Team 2	1st leg	2nd leg
Shakhtyor Soligorsk	5–2	Naftan Novopolotsk	2–1	3–1
BATE Borisov	3–5	Gomel	1–2	2–3

=== First leg ===
7 April 2004	Shakhtyor Soligorsk	2–1	Naftan Novopolotsk	Soligorsk
17:00 UTC+3	Bespansky 14'; Tikhonchik 40'		Strypeykis 72'	Stadium: Stroitel Stadium; Attendance: 2,500; Referee: Yuriy Kuntsevich (Grodno)

7 April 2004	BATE Borisov	1–2	Gomel	Borisov
17:30 UTC+3	Ryndzyuk 45' (pen.)		Usaw 2'; Razumaw 27'	Stadium: City Stadium; Attendance: 2,500; Referee: Valery Vyalichka (Minsk)

=== Second leg ===
11 April 2004	Naftan Novopolotsk	1–3 (2–5 agg.)	Shakhtyor Soligorsk	Novopolotsk
15:00 UTC+3	Strypeykis 52'		Hancharyk 33'; Borel 67', 69'	Stadium: Atlant Stadium; Attendance: 4,500; Referee: Sergey Shmolik (Brest)

11 April 2004	Gomel	3–2 (5–3 agg.)	BATE Borisov	Gomel
15:00 UTC+3	Razumaw 25'; Bliznyuk 38', 76'		Byahanski 49', 79'	Stadium: Luch Stadium; Attendance: 4,500; Referee: Andrey Zhukov (Minsk)

== Final ==
16 May 2004
18:30 UTC+3

Gomel	0–1 (a.e.t.)	Shakhtyor Soligorsk
	Report	Trepachkin 112'

Dinamo Stadium, Minsk
Attendance: 8,500
Referee: Sergey Shmolik (Brest)

GOMEL:
GK	1	(Belarus) Yury Afanasenko
SW	4	(Belarus) Oleg Cherepnev (c)
RB	2	(Belarus) Alyaksandr Shahoyka
CB	3	(Belarus) Aleh Popel		(substituted off) 46'
LB	5	(Belarus) Alyaksey Pankavets
DM	7	(Belarus) Fedor Lukashenko	(yellow card) 59'
RM	10	(Belarus) Maksim Razumaw
LM	11	(Belarus) Alyaksandr Danilaw
AM	15	(Russia) Yevgeni Zinovyev	(yellow card) 95'	(substituted off) 110'
RF	8	(Belarus) Ruslan Usaw	(yellow card) 53'	(substituted off) 68'
LF	9	(Belarus) Gennadi Bliznyuk
Substitutes:
GK	16	(Ukraine) Oleh Venchak
FW	6	(Bulgaria) Stanimir Georgiev
FW	12	(Belarus) Sergey Zabolotsky		(substituted on) 68'
FW	14	(Ukraine) Ruslan Burdeinyi
DF	18	(Belarus) Andrey Harawtsow		(substituted on) 110'
MF	20	(Russia) Yuri Khusyainov		(substituted on) 46'
MF	21	(Belarus) Andrey Arhiptsaw
Manager:
(Russia) Sergei Podpaly

SHAKHTYOR:
GK	1	(Belarus) Aleksandr Gerasimovich
RB	18	(Belarus) Vadzim Lasowski	(substituted off) 88'
CB	3	(Belarus) Anatoly Budayev (c)
CB	6	(Belarus) Alyaksey Belavusaw
LB	5	(Belarus) Alyaksandr Yurevich
DM	7	(Belarus) Andrey Lyavonchyk
RM	2	(Belarus) Roman Trepachkin
LM	13	(Belarus) Alyaksandr Novik	(substituted off) 75'
AM	10	(Belarus) Syarhey Nikifarenka
RF	4	(Belarus) Artsyom Hancharyk	(substituted off) 72'
LF	11	(Belarus) Anatoly Tikhonchik
Substitutes:
GK	16	(Belarus) Vitaly Varivonchik
MF	8	(Belarus) Alyaksandr Grenkow	(substituted on) 75'
FW	9	(Belarus) Maksim Hukayla
MF	12	(Belarus) Dmitry Podrez
FW	14	(Belarus) Vadzim Boyka
FW	15	(Belarus) Viktor Borel	(substituted on) 72'
MF	17	(Belarus) Andrey Paryvayew	(substituted on) 88'
Manager:
(Belarus) Yury Vyarheychyk
