= 2004 Belarusian Premier League =

Belarusian Premier League
- Season: 2004
- Champions: Dinamo Minsk
- Relegated: Lokomotiv Vitebsk; Belshina
- Champions League: Dinamo Minsk
- UEFA Cup: MTZ-RIPO Minsk; BATE Borisov
- Intertoto Cup: Neman
- Matches: 241
- Goals: 652 (2.71 per match)
- Top goalscorer: (Belarus) Valery Strypeykis (18)
- Biggest home win: MTZ-RIPO 6–0 Lokomotiv Vitebsk
- Biggest away win: Belshina 0–5 BATE; MTZ-RIPO 0–5 Torpedo Zhodino
- Highest scoring: 5–2 – 3 games; 6–1 – 1 game

The 2004 Belarusian Premier League was the 14th season of top-tier football in Belarus. It started on April 15 and ended on November 11, 2004. Gomel were the defending champions.

== Team changes from 2003 season ==
Two lowest placed teams in 2003 (Lokomotiv Minsk and Molodechno-2000) relegated and were replaced by two best teams from 2003 First League: newcomers MTZ-RIPO Minsk and Lokomotiv Vitebsk, who previously competed in Premiere League as KIM, Dvina and Lokomotiv-96 and is a different team from Lokomotiv Vitebsk, who relegated to First League in 1995 and after a few seasons in First and Second Leagues was disbanded in late 2000.

== Overview ==
Dinamo Minsk won their 7th champions title and qualified for the next season's Champions League. The championship runners-up BATE Borisov and 2004–05 Cup winners MTZ-RIPO Minsk qualified for UEFA Cup. 2001 champions Belshina Bobruisk finished on last place and directly relegated to the First League. Lokomotiv Vitebsk and MTZ-RIPO Minsk shared 14th and 15th places with equal number of points and had to play one-legged play-off on a neutral ground to determine who will relegate and who will stay. Lokomotiv Vitebsk lost the game and relegated to the First League. Torpedo-SKA Minsk, who finished 6th, lost financial support from their sponsor in early 2005 and, after losing almost all their main squad and not having funds to pay entrance fee for next season's Premiere League, had to relegate to Second League.

== Teams and venues ==
Location of teams in 2004 Belarusian Premier League

Team	Location	Venue	Capacity	Position in 2003
Gomel	Gomel	Central Stadium	10,600	1
BATE	Borisov	City Stadium (Borisov)	5,500	2
Dinamo Minsk	Minsk	Dinamo Stadium	40,000	3
Torpedo-SKA	Minsk	Torpedo Stadium (Minsk)	5,200	4
Shakhtyor	Soligorsk	Stroitel Stadium	3,000	5
Torpedo	Zhodino	Torpedo Stadium (Zhodino)	2,020	6
Neman	Grodno	Neman Stadium	6,300	7
Naftan	Novopolotsk	Atlant Stadium	5,300	8
Dnepr-Transmash	Mogilev	Spartak Stadium (Mogilev)	6,800	9
Belshina	Bobruisk	Spartak Stadium (Bobruisk)	3,000	10
Dinamo Brest	Brest	OSK Brestskiy	3,000	11
Zvezda-VA-BGU	Minsk	Traktor Stadium	17,600	12
Darida	Minsk Raion	Darida Stadium	3,000	13
Slavia	Mozyr	Yunost Stadium	5,300	14
Lokomotiv	Vitebsk	Vitebsky CSK	8,100	First league, 1
MTZ-RIPO	Minsk	Traktor Stadium	17,600	First league, 2

1. One game played at Torpedo Stadium in Minsk.
2. One game played at Torpedo Stadium in Minsk and one game at Spartak Stadium in Mogilev.

== Table ==
Pos	Team	Pld	W	D	L	GF	GA	GD	Pts	Qualification or relegation
1	Dinamo Minsk (C)	30	24	3	3	64	18	+46	75	Qualification for Champions League first qualifying round
2	BATE Borisov	30	22	4	4	59	25	+34	70	Qualification for UEFA Cup first qualifying round
3	Shakhtyor Soligorsk	30	19	8	3	55	21	+34	65	
4	Torpedo Zhodino	30	19	2	9	57	28	+29	59	
5	Gomel	30	13	7	10	42	41	+1	46	
6	Torpedo-SKA Minsk (R)	30	13	7	10	37	31	+6	46	Relegation to Belarusian Second League (Note: Torpedo-SKA Minsk were relegated to the Second League due to the financial reasons.)
7	Neman Grodno	30	11	7	12	37	33	+4	40	Qualification for Intertoto Cup first round
8	Dinamo Brest	30	10	9	11	39	41	−2	39	
9	Dnepr-Transmash Mogilev	30	11	4	15	29	37	−8	37	
10	Naftan Novopolotsk	30	10	5	15	45	50	−5	35	
11	Darida Minsk Raion	30	9	8	13	38	48	−10	35	
12	Slavia Mozyr	30	9	4	17	32	51	−19	31	
13	Zvezda-VA-BGU Minsk	30	7	8	15	31	56	−25	29	
14	MTZ-RIPO Minsk (O)	30	6	9	15	32	56	−24	27	UEFA Cup first qualifying round and relegation play-offs (Note: MTZ-RIPO Minsk qualified for the UEFA Cup first qualifying round by winning the 2004–05 Belarusian Cup.)
15	Lokomotiv Vitebsk (R)	30	8	3	19	34	54	−20	27	Relegation to Belarusian First League (Note: MTZ-RIPO Minsk and Lokomotiv Vitebsk finished the season level on points so the Football Federation of Belarus decided to organise a playoff game to determine which side will be relegated to the First League.)
16	Belshina Bobruisk (R)	30	2	6	22	21	62	−41	12	Relegation to Belarusian First League

Source: rsssf.com
Rules for classification: 1st points; 2nd matches won; 3rd head-to-head
(C) Champions; (O) Play-off winners; (R) Relegated

=== Relegation play-off ===
11 November 2004

Lokomotiv Vitebsk	1 – 4	MTZ-RIPO Minsk
Yeremeyev 66'	Report	Zelmikas 15'; Mkhitaryan 34'; Fedorchenko 55'; Parfenov 61'

Lokomotiv Stadium, Baranovichi
Attendance: 1,000
Referee: Aleksei Kulbakov (Gomel)

== Results ==
Home \ Away	BAT	BSH	DAR	DBR	DMI	DNE	GOM	LVI	MTZ	NAF	NEM	SHA	SLA	TZH	TMI	ZBM
BATE Borisov		2–1	4–1	2–1	1–1	1–0	3–1	3–2	3–0	1–1	1–0	0–1	4–0	2–1	3–1	2–3
Belshina Bobruisk	0–5		2–2	0–0	1–3	0–1	1–4	2–1	1–2	0–0	0–3	1–2	0–0	0–1	0–1	4–1
Darida Minsk Raion	2–3	1–0		0–1	0–4	1–1	1–1	0–3	2–0	1–3	1–0	2–2	3–0	1–2	0–1	3–1
Dinamo Brest	1–1	2–2	0–3		0–3	3–1	0–1	0–1	4–0	3–0	2–0	0–0	0–1	2–2	3–1	2–2
Dinamo Minsk	2–0	5–0	2–2	3–0		2–1	1–0	2–1	1–0	6–1	1–0	1–0	4–2	2–1	0–1	4–0
Dnepr-Transmash Mogilev	0–1	2–0	0–1	0–0	0–1		1–2	1–0	1–1	0–3	3–2	1–1	3–1	0–1	1–0	2–1
Gomel	0–1	4–1	1–1	1–1	2–0	0–4		2–0	2–1	2–2	1–0	1–0	2–1	3–0	0–0	0–0
Lokomotiv Vitebsk	0–1	2–1	1–3	2–3	1–3	0–1	0–1		2–2	1–0	1–2	0–3	2–1	0–0	0–1	2–1
MTZ-RIPO Minsk	0–3	2–1	2–0	1–2	0–0	0–1	5–2	6–0		2–1	0–2	1–4	1–4	0–5	0–3	0–0
Naftan Novopolotsk	0–2	3–0	1–2	3–1	1–3	0–2	1–0	0–3	2–2		3–1	0–1	3–1	2–3	2–2	5–1
Neman Grodno	1–1	1–1	2–2	0–1	0–2	2–1	4–1	1–1	0–0	0–2		1–2	1–0	2–1	2–2	2–0
Shakhtyor Soligorsk	5–1	2–0	4–1	5–2	0–1	1–0	2–1	4–1	3–3	1–0	0–0		2–1	2–1	0–0	1–0
Slavia Mozyr	0–1	2–1	3–1	1–0	1–3	2–0	1–0	3–1	1–1	2–0	1–3	0–5		0–2	2–2	0–0
Torpedo Zhodino	0–2	3–0	2–0	2–1	0–1	3–0	4–0	4–1	3–0	3–1	1–0	1–2	3–1		1–0	5–2
Torpedo-SKA Minsk	0–3	3–0	1–0	2–3	2–0	5–1	2–4	2–1	0–0	2–1	1–2	0–0	1–0	1–0		0–1
Zvezda-VA-BGU Minsk	0–2	2–1	1–1	1–1	0–3	2–0	3–3	1–4	3–0 (Note: MTZ-RIPO was awarded a technical loss for entering the field of a disqualified player.)	2–4	0–3	0–0	2–0	0–2	1–0	

Source: football.by (in Belarusian)
Legend: Blue = home team win; Yellow = draw; Red = away team win.

== Belarusian clubs in European Cups ==
Round	Team #1	Agg.	Team #2	1st leg	2nd leg
2004 UEFA Intertoto Cup
First round	Odra Wodzisław (Poland)	1–2	(Belarus) Dinamo Minsk	1–0	0–2
Second round	Dinamo Minsk (Belarus)	4–3	(Serbia and Montenegro) Smederevo	1–2	3–1 (aet)
Third round	Lille (France)	4–3	(Belarus) Dinamo Minsk	2–1	2–2
2004–05 UEFA Cup
First qualifying round	Nistru Otaci (Moldova)	3–2	(Belarus) Shakhtyor Soligorsk	1–1	2–1
First qualifying round	BATE Borisov (Belarus)	2–4	(Georgia (country)) Dinamo Tbilisi	2–3	0–1
2004–05 UEFA Champions League
First qualifying round	Gomel (Belarus)	1–2	(Albania) Tirana	0–2	1–0

== Top scorers ==
Rank	Name	Team	Goals
1	(Belarus) Valery Strypeykis	Naftan Novopolotsk	18
2	(Belarus) Raman Vasilyuk	Dinamo Brest	17
3	(Russia) Aleksandr Sokolov	Darida Minsk Raion	16
4	(Belarus) Yawhen Zuew	Torpedo Zhodino	15
5	(Ukraine) Vitaliy Bondarev	Dnepr-Transmash Mogilev	14
5	(Belarus) Artsyom Hancharyk	Shakhtyor Soligorsk	14
7	(Belarus) Oleg Strakhanovich	BATE Borisov	13
8	(Brazil) Edu	Torpedo-SKA Minsk	12
8	(Belarus) Dzmitry Parfyonaw	MTZ-RIPO Minsk	12
8	(Belarus) Andrey Razin	Dinamo Minsk	12

== See also ==
- 2004 Belarusian First League
- 2003–04 Belarusian Cup
- 2004–05 Belarusian Cup
