= 2003 Belarusian Premier League =

Belarusian Premier League
- Season: 2003
- Champions: Gomel
- Relegated: Lokomotiv Minsk; Molodechno-2000
- Champions League: Gomel
- UEFA Cup: Shakhtyor; BATE
- Intertoto Cup: Dinamo Minsk
- Matches: 240
- Goals: 621 (2.59 per match)
- Top goalscorer: (Belarus) Gennadi Bliznyuk, (Belarus) Sergei Kornilenko – (18)
- Biggest home win: Shakhtyor 9–0 Zvezda-VA-BGU
- Biggest away win: Slavia 0–7 Dinamo Minsk; Slavia 0–7 BATE
- Highest scoring: Shakhtyor 9–0 Zvezda-VA-BGU; Belshina 4–5 Dnepr-Transmash

The 2003 Belarusian Premier League was the 13th season of top-tier football in Belarus. The first round was postponed from April 11–12 to later dates due to heavy snowfall. The season finally started on April 18 and ended on November 9, 2003. BATE Borisov were the defending champions.

== Team changes from 2002 season ==
Due to Premiere League expansion from 14 to 16 teams, one lowest placed team in 2002 Lokomotiv-96 Vitebsk was replaced by three best teams from 2002 First League: Darida Minsk Raion, Naftan Novopolotsk and Lokomotiv Minsk. Torpedo-MAZ Minsk changed their name to Torpedo-SKA Minsk. Darida originally was registered in Minsk suburb Zhdanovichi, while playing their games in Kuntsevschina district in Minsk. The team was renamed to Darida-TDZh Zhdanovichi (due to sponsorship from shopping center Zhdanovichi) for a few weeks in early 2003. However, after shopping center cancelled their sponsorship, team's name was changed back to Darida and official location became Minsk Raion, while team's office and stadium locations remained the same.

== Overview ==
Gomel won their 1st champions title and qualified for the next season's Champions League. The championship runners-up BATE Borisov and 2003–04 Cup winners Shakhtyor Soligorsk qualified for UEFA Cup. Teams finished on the last two places (Lokomotiv Minsk and Molodechno-2000) relegated to the First League.

== Teams and venues ==
Location of teams in 2003 Belarusian Premier League

Team	Location	Venue	Capacity	Position in 2002
BATE	Borisov	City Stadium (Borisov)	5,500	1
Neman	Grodno	Neman Stadium	15,000	2
Shakhtyor	Soligorsk	Stroitel Stadium	5,000	3
Torpedo-SKA	Minsk	Torpedo Stadium (Minsk)	5,200	4
Torpedo	Zhodino	Torpedo Stadium (Zhodino)	5,000	5
Gomel	Gomel	Luch Stadium	5,000	6
Dinamo Minsk	Minsk	Dinamo Stadium	40,000	7
Belshina	Bobruisk	Spartak Stadium (Bobruisk)	4,600	8
Dnepr-Transmash	Mogilev	Spartak Stadium (Mogilev)	6,775	9
Dinamo Brest	Brest	OSK Brestskiy	3,000	10
Slavia	Mozyr	Yunost Stadium	5,250	11
Zvezda-VA-BGU	Minsk	Traktor Stadium	17,000	12
Molodechno-2000	Molodechno	City Stadium (Molodechno)	5,650	13
Darida	Minsk Raion	Darida Stadium	3,000	First league, 1
Naftan	Novopolotsk	Atlant Stadium	6,500	First league, 2
Lokomotiv	Minsk	Lokomotiv Stadium	860	First league, 3

1. Four games played at City Stadium in Lida due to renovation works at Neman Stadium.
2. Gomel spent the season at Luch Stadium, as their regular stadium Central Stadium was closed for renovation.

== Table ==
Pos	Team	Pld	W	D	L	GF	GA	GD	Pts	Qualification or relegation
1	Gomel (C)	30	23	5	2	56	12	+44	74	Qualification for Champions League first qualifying round
2	BATE Borisov	30	20	6	4	70	21	+49	66	Qualification for UEFA Cup first qualifying round
3	Dinamo Minsk	30	20	4	6	62	24	+38	64	Qualification for Intertoto Cup first round
4	Torpedo-SKA Minsk	30	19	7	4	54	20	+34	64	
5	Shakhtyor Soligorsk	30	19	7	4	60	23	+37	64	Qualification for UEFA Cup first qualifying round (Note: Shakhtyor Soligorsk qualified for the UEFA Cup first qualifying round by winning the 2003–04 Belarusian Cup.)
6	Torpedo Zhodino	30	13	10	7	44	25	+19	49	
7	Neman Grodno	30	10	9	11	24	35	−11	39	
8	Naftan Novopolotsk	30	10	5	15	39	49	−10	35	
9	Dnepr-Transmash Mogilev	30	8	10	12	38	46	−8	34	
10	Belshina Bobruisk	30	8	8	14	44	50	−6	32	
11	Dinamo Brest	30	5	12	13	21	49	−28	27	
12	Zvezda-VA-BGU Minsk	30	7	4	19	23	64	−41	25	
13	Darida Minsk Raion	30	7	4	19	22	45	−23	25	
14	Slavia Mozyr	30	6	7	17	29	64	−35	25	
15	Lokomotiv Minsk (R)	30	5	9	16	16	42	−26	24	Relegation to Belarusian First League
16	Molodechno-2000 (R)	30	3	7	20	19	52	−33	16	Relegation to Belarusian First League

Source: rsssf.com
Rules for classification: 1st points; 2nd matches won; 3rd head-to-head
(C) Champions; (R) Relegated

== Results ==
Home \ Away	BAT	BSH	DAR	DBR	DMI	DNE	GOM	LMN	MOL	NAF	NEM	SHA	SLA	TZH	TMI	ZBM
BATE Borisov		2–0	2–0	3–1	1–2	2–0	0–0	4–0	3–2	2–1	4–0	4–1	5–0	1–1	2–0	1–0
Belshina Bobruisk	0–0		1–0	2–2	0–1	4–5	0–2	4–0	2–0	1–3	1–1	0–0	3–2	2–2	1–1	1–0
Darida Minsk Raion	1–0	1–0		3–0	0–3	3–2	0–2	2–0	2–0	0–1	0–1	2–3	2–2	0–2	0–3	2–2
Dinamo Brest	0–1	1–1	1–0		0–2	1–1	0–0	0–0	0–0	4–2	0–1	0–3	0–0	0–2	1–5	0–1
Dinamo Minsk	0–4	1–3	5–0	3–0		4–0	0–2	1–0	4–0	1–0	0–0	2–2	3–0	3–1	1–0	4–0
Dnepr-Transmash Mogilev	3–3	5–2	1–0	1–1	0–1		1–2	0–0	2–2	2–0	0–0	1–0	1–1	1–4	0–2	1–0
Gomel	2–0	4–2	1–0	5–1	3–0	3–1		3–0	0–0	3–0	2–0	1–0	3–1	0–0	1–0	2–0
Lokomotiv Minsk	2–2	3–2	3–0	0–2	0–2	0–0	0–2		0–0	1–0	1–1	1–2	0–1	0–0	0–1	2–1
Molodechno-2000	1–4	1–0	1–1	1–2	0–2	0–2	0–1	0–0		1–2	0–1	0–3	2–1	0–2	0–3	1–1
Naftan Novopolotsk	1–1	0–4	1–2	5–0	3–2	2–1	0–2	2–1	2–0		1–2	3–3	1–0	0–3	1–1	2–3
Neman Grodno	0–3	2–0	1–0	0–0	0–0	1–1	1–4	2–0	3–1	1–1		1–2	1–0	0–0	0–2	2–0
Shakhtyor Soligorsk	3–1	1–1	1–0	5–0	1–1	3–1	2–1	3–0	1–0	1–0	2–0		1–0	2–0	0–0	9–0
Slavia Mozyr	0–7	3–2	0–0	1–1	0–7	2–1	1–4	0–2	2–0	2–3	1–0	0–1		2–2	0–2	3–3
Torpedo Zhodino	0–3	2–1	3–1	0–0	0–1	2–0	0–0	2–0	3–0	3–1	5–0	0–0	1–3		2–2	2–0
Torpedo-SKA Minsk	0–2	5–2	2–0	1–1	2–0	1–1	2–0	3–0	2–1	1–1	2–1	2–1	4–0	1–0		1–0
Zvezda-VA-BGU Minsk	0–3	0–2	1–0	0–2	2–6	0–3	0–1	0–0	1–5	1–0	2–1	1–4	2–1	1–0	1–3	

Source: football.by (in Belarusian)
Legend: Blue = home team win; Yellow = draw; Red = away team win.

== Belarusian clubs in European Cups ==
Round	Team #1	Agg.	Team #2	1st leg	2nd leg
2003 UEFA Intertoto Cup
First round	Shakhtyor Soligorsk (Belarus)	8–1	(Northern Ireland) Omagh Town	1–0	7–1
Second round	Shakhtyor Soligorsk (Belarus)	3–5	(Croatia) Cibalia Vinkovci	1–1	2–4
2003–04 UEFA Cup
Qualifying round	Brøndby (Denmark)	5–0	(Belarus) Dinamo Minsk	3–0	2–0
Qualifying round	Neman Grodno (Belarus)	1–1 (a)	(Romania) Steaua București	1–1	0–0
2003–04 UEFA Champions League
First qualifying round	BATE Borisov (Belarus)	1–3	(Republic of Ireland) Bohemians	1–0	0–3

== Top scorers ==
Rank	Name	Team	Goals
1	(Belarus) Gennadi Bliznyuk	Gomel	18
1	(Belarus) Sergei Kornilenko	Dinamo Minsk	18
3	(Belarus) Anatoly Tikhonchik	Shakhtyor Soligorsk	17
4	(Belarus) Pavel Byahanski	BATE Borisov	16
4	(Belarus) Yury Markhel	Torpedo Zhodino	16
6	(Ukraine) Oleksandr Pyschur	Dnepr-Transmash Mogilev	13
7	(Belarus) Aleksey Denisenya	Belshina Bobruisk	12
8	(Belarus) Aleksandr Borisik	Belshina Bobruisk	11
9	(Georgia (country)) Suliko Kakabadze	Naftan Novopolotsk	10
9	(Belarus) Syarhey Kozak	Torpedo-SKA Minsk	10
9	(Belarus) Syarhey Nikiforenka	Shakhtyor Soligorsk	10

== See also ==
- 2003 Belarusian First League
- 2002–03 Belarusian Cup
- 2003–04 Belarusian Cup
