= 2004 Belarusian First League =

Belarusian First League
- Season: 2004
- Champions: Lokomotiv Minsk
- Promoted: Lokomotiv Minsk
- Relegated: Molodechno-2000; Vertikal Kalinkovichi; Dinamo-Juni Minsk
- Matches: 240
- Goals: 577 (2.4 per match)

2004 Belarusian First League was the 14th season of 2nd level football championship in Belarus. It started in April and ended in November 2004.

== Team changes from 2003 season ==
Two top teams of last season (Lokomotiv Vitebsk and MTZ-RIPO Minsk) were promoted to Belarusian Premier League. They were replaced by two teams that finished at the bottom of 2003 Belarusian Premier League table (Lokomotiv Minsk and Molodechno-2000).

Two teams that finished at the bottom of 2003 season table (Neman Mosty and Pinsk-900) relegated to the Second League. They were replaced by two best teams of 2003 Second League (Baranovichi and Veras Nesvizh).

== Teams and locations ==
Location of teams in 2004 Belarusian First League

Team	Location	Position in 2003
Lokomotiv	Minsk	Premier League, 15
Molodechno-2000	Molodechno	Premier League, 16
Smorgon	Smorgon	3
Vedrich-97	Rechitsa	4
Granit	Mikashevichi	5
ZLiN	Gomel	6
Khimik	Svetlogorsk	7
Lida	Lida	8
Torpedo-Kadino	Mogilev	9
Kommunalnik	Slonim	10
Dnepr-DUSSh-1	Rogachev	11
Dinamo-Juni	Minsk	12
Vertikal	Kalinkovichi	13
Bereza	Bereza	14
Baranovichi	Baranovichi	Second League, 1
Veras	Nesvizh	Second League, 2

== League table ==
Pos	Team	Pld	W	D	L	GF	GA	GD	Pts	Promotion or relegation
1	Lokomotiv Minsk (P)	30	24	3	3	75	25	+50	75	Promotion to Belarusian Premier League
2	Vedrich-97 Rechitsa	30	18	8	4	46	21	+25	62 (Note: Vedrich-97 Rechitsa initially won promotion, but failed to fulfill Premier League licensing criteria and had to stay in the First League. No other team replaced them in the Premier League, which was instead reduced.)	
3	Smorgon	30	14	11	5	49	21	+28	53	
4	Granit Mikashevichi	30	12	10	8	31	22	+9	46 (Note: Granit Mikashevichi placed above ZLiN Gomel by better head-to-head record (0–0, 1–0).)	
5	ZLiN Gomel	30	12	10	8	31	18	+13	46	
6	Veras Nesvizh	30	14	2	14	35	34	+1	44	
7	Baranovichi	30	13	5	12	41	39	+2	44	
8	Lida	30	11	7	12	37	30	+7	40	
9	Khimik Svetlogorsk	30	9	13	8	19	18	+1	40	
10	Bereza	30	10	7	13	39	45	−6	37	
11	Kommunalnik Slonim	30	9	7	14	33	47	−14	34	
12	Torpedo-Kadino Mogilev	30	7	11	12	31	45	−14	32	
13	Molodechno-2000 (R)	30	9	4	17	27	54	−27	31	Withdrew to Belarusian Second League
14	Dnepr-DUSSh-1 Rogachev	30	9	3	18	27	54	−27	30	
15	Vertikal Kalinkovichi (R)	30	7	8	15	29	49	−20	29	Relegation to Belarusian Second League
16	Dinamo-Juni Minsk (R)	30	6	3	21	27	55	−28	21	Relegation to Belarusian Second League

Source: rsssf.com
Rules for classification: 1st points; 2nd matches won; 3rd head-to-head (points, matches won, goal difference, goals scored); 4th goal difference; 5th goals scored
(P) Promoted; (R) Relegated

== Top goalscorers ==
Rank	Goalscorer	Team	Goals
1	(Russia) Aleksei Martynov	Lokomotiv Minsk	19
2	(Belarus) Mihail Litvinchuk	Lokomotiv Minsk	16
2	(Belarus) Dzmitry Vyarstak	Smorgon	16
4	(Belarus) Sergey Krivets	Lokomotiv Minsk	12
4	(Belarus) Mihail Eramchuk	Vedrich-97 Rechitsa	12
4	(Belarus) Dmitry Gavrilovich	Veras Nesvizh	12

== See also ==
- 2004 Belarusian Premier League
- 2003–04 Belarusian Cup
- 2004–05 Belarusian Cup
