= 2005 Belarusian First League =

Belarusian First League
- Season: 2005
- Champions: Belshina Bobruisk
- Promoted: Belshina Bobruisk; Lokomotiv Vitebsk
- Relegated: Torpedo-Kadino Mogilev; Orsha; Dnepr-DUSSh-1 Rogachev
- Matches: 240
- Goals: 636 (2.65 per match)

2005 Belarusian First League was the 15th season of 2nd level football championship in Belarus. It started in April and ended in November 2005.

== Team changes from 2004 season ==
Two top teams of the last season (Lokomotiv Minsk and Vedrich-97 Rechitsa) were promoted to Belarusian Premier League. They were replaced by two teams that finished at the bottom of 2004 Belarusian Premier League table (Lokomotiv Vitebsk and Belshina Bobruisk).

Two teams that finished at the bottom of 2004 season table (Vertikal Kalinkovichi and Dinamo-Juni Minsk) relegated to the Second League. They were replaced by two best teams of 2004 Second League (Smena Minsk and Orsha).

Vedrich-97 Rechitsa were not able to fulfill Premier League licensing criteria and remained in the First League.

Molodechno-2000 (who finished 13th last season) withdrew to the Second League due to insufficient financing.

== Teams and locations ==
Location of teams in 2005 Belarusian First League

Team	Location	Position in 2004
Lokomotiv	Vitebsk	Premier League, 15
Belshina	Bobruisk	Premier League, 16
Vedrich-97	Rechitsa	2
Smorgon	Smorgon	3
Granit	Mikashevichi	4
ZLiN	Gomel	5
Veras	Nesvizh	6
Baranovichi	Baranovichi	7
Lida	Lida	8
Khimik	Svetlogorsk	9
Bereza	Bereza	10
Kommunalnik	Slonim	11
Torpedo-Kadino	Mogilev	12
Dnepr-DUSSh-1	Rogachev	14
Smena	Minsk	Second League, 1
Orsha	Orsha	Second League, 2

== League table ==
Pos	Team	Pld	W	D	L	GF	GA	GD	Pts	Promotion or relegation
1	Belshina Bobruisk (P)	30	23	4	3	61	19	+42	73	Promotion to Belarusian Premier League
2	Lokomotiv Vitebsk (P)	30	21	7	2	76	23	+53	70	Promotion to Belarusian Premier League
3	Smorgon	30	15	9	6	57	35	+22	54	
4	ZLiN Gomel	30	14	12	4	35	17	+18	54	
5	Smena Minsk	30	14	8	8	31	23	+8	50	
6	Granit Mikashevichi	30	13	7	10	39	35	+4	46	
7	Khimik Svetlogorsk	30	14	3	13	42	34	+8	45	
8	Vedrich-97 Rechitsa	30	11	6	13	37	41	−4	39	
9	Baranovichi	30	11	5	14	38	43	−5	38	
10	Lida	30	10	7	13	41	43	−2	37	
11	Veras Nesvizh	30	9	10	11	31	33	−2	37	
12	Torpedo-Kadino Mogilev (R)	30	7	8	15	22	45	−23	29	Disbanded
13	Kommunalnik Slonim	30	8	4	18	35	43	−8	28 (Note: Kommunalnik Slonim placed above Bereza by better head-to-head record (1–1, 5–0).)	
14	Bereza	30	8	4	18	36	58	−22	28	
15	Orsha (R)	30	6	6	18	33	74	−41	24	Relegation to Belarusian Second League
16	Dnepr-DUSSh-1 Rogachev (R)	30	4	4	22	22	70	−48	16	Relegation to Belarusian Second League

Source: rsssf.com
Rules for classification: 1st points; 2nd matches won; 3rd head-to-head (points, matches won, goal difference, goals scored); 4th goal difference; 5th goals scored.
(P) Promoted; (R) Relegated

== Top goalscorers ==
Rank	Goalscorer	Team	Goals
1	(Belarus) Ruslan Usaw	Lokomotiv Vitebsk	32
2	(Belarus) Dzmitry Asipenka	Smorgon	17
3	(Belarus) Aleksandr Chuduk	Baranovichi	15
4	(Belarus) Vadim Sugako	Kommunalnik Slonim	13
5	(Belarus) Dmitry Gavrilovich	Khimik Svetlogorsk	12
5	(Belarus) Sergey Vekhtev	Lokomotiv Vitebsk	12
5	(Ukraine) Oleksiy Kopylchenko	Belshina Bobruisk	12
5	(Belarus) Andrey Chisty	Granit Mikashevichi	12

== See also ==
- 2005 Belarusian Premier League
- 2004–05 Belarusian Cup
- 2005–06 Belarusian Cup
