= 2002 Belarusian First League =

Belarusian First League
- Season: 2002
- Champions: Darida Minsk Raion
- Promoted: Darida Minsk Raion; Naftan Novopolotsk; Lokomotiv Minsk
- Relegated: Osipovichi
- Matches: 240
- Goals: 657 (2.74 per match)

2002 Belarusian First League was the 12th season of 2nd level football championship in Belarus. It started in April and ended in October 2002.

== Team changes from 2001 season ==
Two top teams of last season (Torpedo Zhodino and Zvezda-VA-BGU Minsk) were promoted to Belarusian Premier League. They were replaced by two teams that finished at the bottom of 2001 Belarusian Premier League table (Naftan Novopolotsk and Vedrich-97 Rechitsa).

One team that finished at the bottom of 2001 season table (Rogachev-DUSSh-1) relegated to the Second League. They were replaced by two best teams of 2001 Second League (Lokomotiv Minsk and Smorgon), and the league was expended from 15 to 16 teams.

Orsha, who finished 12th last season, withdrew to the amateur level in winter. To replace them, Rogachev-DUSSh-1 were spared from relegation.

Before the start of the season, Svisloch Osipovichi changed their name to Osipovichi, Keramik Bereza to FC Bereza and Rogachev-DUSSh-1 to Dnepr-DUSSh-1 Rogachev.

== Teams and locations ==
Location of teams in 2001 Belarusian First League

Team	Location	Position in 2001
Naftan	Novopolotsk	Premier League, 13
Vedrich-97	Rechitsa	Premier League, 14
Darida	Minsk Raion	3
Khimik	Svetlogorsk	4
Torpedo-Kadino	Mogilev	5
Granit	Mikashevichi	6
ZLiN	Gomel	7
Bereza	Bereza	8
Lida	Lida	9
Kommunalnik	Slonim	10
Osipovichi	Osipovichi	11
Dinamo-Juni	Minsk	13
Neman	Mosty	14
Dnepr-DUSSh-1	Rogachev	15
Lokomotiv	Minsk	Second League, 1
Smorgon	Smorgon	Second League, 2

== League table ==
Pos	Team	Pld	W	D	L	GF	GA	GD	Pts	Promotion or relegation
1	Darida Minsk Raion (P)	30	23	5	2	89	23	+66	74	Promotion to Belarusian Premier League
2	Naftan Novopolotsk (P)	30	21	5	4	56	23	+33	68	Promotion to Belarusian Premier League
3	Lokomotiv Minsk (P)	30	20	6	4	59	16	+43	66	Promotion to Belarusian Premier League
4	Vedrich-97 Rechitsa	30	19	4	7	55	25	+30	61	
5	Granit Mikashevichi	30	16	9	5	37	22	+15	57	
6	Lida	30	14	4	12	39	39	0	46 (Note: Lida placed above ZLiN Gomel by better head-to-head record (4–1, 0–1).)	
7	ZLiN Gomel	30	14	4	12	42	34	+8	46	
8	Kommunalnik Slonim	30	9	8	13	27	41	−14	35	
9	Dinamo-Juni Minsk	30	11	1	18	40	47	−7	34	
10	Torpedo-Kadino Mogilev	30	9	7	14	41	44	−3	34 (Note: Torpedo-Kadino Mogilev placed above Neman Mosty by better overall goal difference, having an equal head-to-head record (3–0, 0–3).)	
11	Neman Mosty	30	9	7	14	36	47	−11	34	
12	Dnepr-DUSSh-1 Rogachev	30	8	7	15	35	49	−14	31	
13	Khimik Svetlogorsk	30	8	6	16	27	46	−19	30	
14	Smorgon	30	8	5	17	21	36	−15	29	
15	Bereza	30	6	5	19	36	65	−29	23	
16	Osipovichi (R)	30	2	3	25	17	100	−83	9	Relegation to Belarusian Second League

Source: rsssf.com
Rules for classification: 1st points; 2nd matches won; 3rd head-to-head (points, matches won, goal difference, goals scored); 4th goal difference; 5th goals scored.
(P) Promoted; (R) Relegated

== Top goalscorers ==
Rank	Goalscorer	Team	Goals
1	(Belarus) Oleg Kuzmenok	Darida Minsk Raion	39
2	(Belarus) Andrey Yusipets	Vedrich-97 Rechitsa	20
3	(Belarus) Dmitry Denisyuk	Lokomotiv Minsk	16
4	(Belarus) Aleksey Novitskiy	Dnepr-DUSSh-1 Rogachev	15
5	(Belarus) Ruslan Usaw	ZLiN Gomel	14

== See also ==
- 2002 Belarusian Premier League
- 2001–02 Belarusian Cup
- 2002–03 Belarusian Cup
