= 2003 Belarusian First League =

Belarusian First League
- Season: 2003
- Champions: Lokomotiv Vitebsk
- Promoted: Lokomotiv Vitebsk; MTZ-RIPO Minsk
- Relegated: Neman Mosty; Pinsk-900
- Matches: 240
- Goals: 613 (2.55 per match)

2003 Belarusian First League was the 13th season of 2nd level football championship in Belarus. It started in April and ended in November 2003.

== Team changes from 2002 season ==
Three top teams of last season (Darida Minsk Raion, Naftan Novopolotsk and Lokomotiv Minsk) were promoted to Belarusian Premier League. Due to the expansion of Premier League from 14 to 16 clubs, the promoted teams were replaced by only one team that finished at the bottom of 2002 Belarusian Premier League table (Lokomotiv-96 Vitebsk).

One team that finished at the bottom of 2002 season table (Osipovichi) relegated to the Second League. They were replaced by three best teams of 2002 Second League (MTZ-RIPO Minsk, Pinsk-900 and Vertikal Kalinkovichi).

Lokomotiv-96 Vitebsk shortened their name to Lokomotiv Vitebsk before the start of the season.

== Teams and locations ==
Location of teams in 2003 Belarusian First League

Team	Location	Position in 2002
Lokomotiv	Vitebsk	Premier League, 14
Vedrich-97	Rechitsa	4
Granit	Mikashevichi	5
Lida	Lida	6
ZLiN	Gomel	7
Kommunalnik	Slonim	8
Dinamo-Juni	Minsk	9
Torpedo-Kadino	Mogilev	10
Neman	Mosty	11
Dnepr-DUSSh-1	Rogachev	12
Khimik	Svetlogorsk	13
Smorgon	Smorgon	14
Bereza	Bereza	15
MTZ-RIPO	Minsk	Second League, 1
Pinsk-900	Pinsk	Second League, 2
Vertikal	Kalinkovichi	Second League, 3

== League table ==
Pos	Team	Pld	W	D	L	GF	GA	GD	Pts	Promotion or relegation
1	Lokomotiv Vitebsk (P)	30	22	4	4	57	21	+36	70 (Note: Lokomotiv Vitebsk placed above MTZ-RIPO Minsk after winning additional 1st place playoff match (2–1 at the neutral venue in Baranovichi).)	Promotion to Belarusian Premier League
2	MTZ-RIPO Minsk (P)	30	22	4	4	63	15	+48	70	Promotion to Belarusian Premier League
3	Smorgon	30	17	7	6	47	20	+27	58	
4	Vedrich-97 Rechitsa	30	16	5	9	52	29	+23	53	
5	Granit Mikashevichi	30	14	9	7	34	27	+7	51	
6	ZLiN Gomel	30	14	6	10	47	38	+9	48	
7	Khimik Svetlogorsk	30	13	7	10	42	39	+3	46	
8	Lida	30	13	4	13	45	35	+10	43	
9	Torpedo-Kadino Mogilev	30	11	9	10	37	37	0	42 (Note: Torpedo-Kadino Mogilev placed above Kommunalnik Slonim by better head-to-head record (1–1, 2–1).)	
10	Kommunalnik Slonim	30	11	9	10	37	39	−2	42	
11	Dnepr-DUSSh-1 Rogachev	30	8	5	17	32	52	−20	29	
12	Dinamo-Juni Minsk	30	7	6	17	27	60	−33	27 (Note: Dinamo-Juni Minsk placed above Vertikal Kalinkovichi by better head-to-head record (3–1, 2–1).)	
13	Vertikal Kalinkovichi	30	7	6	17	22	44	−22	27	
14	Bereza	30	6	8	16	17	44	−27	26	
15	Neman Mosty (R)	30	5	5	20	26	54	−28	20	Relegation to Belarusian Second League
16	Pinsk-900 (R)	30	5	4	21	28	59	−31	19	Relegation to Belarusian Second League

Source: rsssf.com
Rules for classification: 1st points; 2nd matches won; 3rd head-to-head (points, matches won, goal difference, goals scored); 4th goal difference; 5th goals scored
(P) Promoted; (R) Relegated

== Top goalscorers ==
Rank	Goalscorer	Team	Goals
1	(Belarus) Oleg Kuzmenok	MTZ-RIPO Minsk	25
2	(Belarus) Aleksandr Savelyev	ZLiN Gomel	20
3	(Ukraine) Dmytro Kolodin	Lokomotiv Vitebsk	17
4	(Belarus) Sergey Ulezlo	Khimik Svetlogorsk	15
5	(Belarus) Mihail Eramchuk	Vedrich-97 Rechitsa	13

== See also ==
- 2003 Belarusian Premier League
- 2002–03 Belarusian Cup
- 2003–04 Belarusian Cup
