= Yury Afanasenko =

Belarusian football coach (born 1973)

Personal information
- Date of birth: 19 August 1973 (age 53)
- Place of birth: Bobruisk, Byelorussian SSR, Soviet Union
- Height: 1.90 m (6 ft 3 in)
- Position: Goalkeeper

Senior career*
Years	Team	Apps	(Gls)
1990	Dinamo Minsk	0	(0)
1991	Dinamo Brest	29	(0)
1992	Dinamo-2 Minsk	6	(0)
1992–1995	Dinamo Minsk	32	(0)
1996–1997	Dinamo-93 Minsk	55	(0)
1998	Alania Vladikavkaz	7	(0)
1999–2001	Dinamo Minsk	47	(0)
2001	Dinamo Brest	13	(0)
2002	Belshina Bobruisk	7	(0)
2003–2004	Gomel	37	(0)
2005	Dinamo Brest	18	(0)

International career
1992–1995	Belarus U21	9	(0)
1996–1999	Belarus	3	(0)

Managerial career
- 2006: Darida Minsk Raion (goalkeeper coach)
- 2006–2007: Vitebsk (goalkeeper coach)
- 2007–2008: Darida Minsk Raion (goalkeeper coach)
- 2008–2010: Dinamo Brest (goalkeeper coach)
- * Club domestic league appearances and goals

Yury Afanasenko (born 19 August 1973) is a Belarusian professional football coach and a former player. As a player, he played for Dinamo Minsk, Dinamo Brest, Alania Vladikavkaz, Belshina Bobruisk, and Gomel.

== Career ==
After leaving Dinamo Minsk, Afanasenko signed for Alania in Russia. However, despite signing a three-year contract, he was released after six games.

== Honours ==
Dinamo Minsk

- Belarusian Premier League champion: 1992–93, 1993–94, 1994–95, 1995.
- Belarusian Cup winner: 1994.

Gomel

- Belarusian Premier League champion: 2003.
