= 1993–94 Belarusian Cup =

Tournament details
- Country: Belarus
- Teams: 28

Final positions
- Champions: Dinamo Minsk (2nd title)
- Runners-up: Fandok Bobruisk

Tournament statistics
- Matches played: 33
- Goals scored: 98 (2.97 per match)
- Top goal scorer(s): Syarhey Herasimets (4 goals)

The 1993–94 Belarusian Cup was the third season of the annual Belarusian football cup competition.

Contrary to the league season, it is conducted in a fall-spring rhythm. The competition began on 3 July 1993 with the first of five rounds and ended on 24 June 1994 with the final at the Dinamo Stadium in Minsk.

FC Neman Grodno were the defending champions, having defeated FC Vedrich Rechitsa in the 1993 final, but were knocked out in the first round by Albertin Slonim.

FC Dinamo Minsk won the final against FC Fandok Bobruisk to win their second title.

== Round of 32 ==
The games were played on 3 July 1993.

Team 1	Score	Team 2
Obuvshchik Lida (II)	1–2 (a.e.t.)	Dinamo Minsk
Santanas Samokhvalovichi (II)	0–4	Dnepr Mogilev
Zaria Iazyl (III)	0–9	Dinamo Brest
Kommunalnik Pinsk (II)	5–2	Torpedo Mogilev
Kolos-Stroitel Ustye (III)	1–2	Stroitel Starye Dorogi
Polesye Mozyr (II)	0–1	Vedrich Rechitsa
Torpedo Zhodino (II)	1–1 (a.e.t.) (4–2 p)	Lokomotiv Vitebsk
Smena Minsk (II)	1–3	Fandok Bobruisk
Albertin Slonim (II)	2–1	Neman Grodno
Legmach Orsha (III)	1–3	Torpedo Minsk
Ataka-407 Minsk (III)	1–3	Shinnik Bobruisk
Kardan-Flyers Grodno (III)	1–0	Dinamo-93 Minsk

== Round of 16 ==
The games were played on 7 July 1993.

Team 1	Score	Team 2
Gomselmash Gomel	0–1	Shakhtyor Soligorsk
Dinamo Minsk	2–1	Dnepr Mogilev
Dinamo Brest	3–1	Kommunalnik Pinsk (II)
Stroitel Starye Dorogi	1–0	Vedrich Rechitsa
Fandok Bobruisk	3–2	Torpedo Zhodino (II)
Torpedo Minsk	3–1	Albertin Slonim (II)
Shinnik Bobruisk	3–1	Kardan-Flyers Grodno (III)
KIM Vitebsk	0–2	Molodechno

== Quarterfinals ==
The first legs were played on 11 July 1993 and the second legs were played on 2 and 8 August 1993.

Team 1	Agg.	Team 2	1st leg	2nd leg
Molodechno	2–0	Shakhtyor Soligorsk	1–0	1–0
Dinamo Minsk	1–0	Torpedo Minsk	1–0	0–0
Dinamo Brest	3–0	Stroitel Starye Dorogi	2–0	1–0
Fandok Bobruisk	1–0	Shinnik Bobruisk	0–0	1–0

== Semifinals ==
The first legs were played on 6 October 1993 and the second legs were played on 28 October 1993.

Team 1	Agg.	Team 2	1st leg	2nd leg
Dinamo Minsk	6–0	Dinamo Brest	4–0	2–0
Fandok Bobruisk	4–1	Molodechno	3–0	1–1

== Final ==
The final match was played on 24 June 1994 at the Dinamo Stadium in Minsk.

24 June 1994
18:00 UTC+3

Dinamo Minsk	3–1	Fandok Bobruisk
Kachura 20'; Shukanov 68'; Baranovsky 90'	Report	Yaromko 28'

Dinamo Stadium, Minsk
Attendance: 3,000
Referee: Vadim Zhuk (Minsk)

Dinamo Minsk	Fandok Bobruisk

DINAMO:
GK	1	(Belarus) Yury Afanasenko
DF	7	(Belarus) Alyaksandar Lukhvich	(yellow card) 72'
DF	6	(Belarus) Alyaksandr Taykow
DF	9	(Belarus) Yevgeni Kashentsev	(yellow card) 46'
DF	3	(Belarus) Andrey Astrowski
MF	5	(Belarus) Aleh Charnyawski
MF	2	(Belarus) Antuan Mayorov		(substituted off) 46'
MF	8	(Belarus) Eduard Demenkovets
MF	4	(Belarus) Valyantsin Byalkevich		(substituted off) 86'
FW	10	(Belarus) Yuri Shukanov	(yellow card) 23'
FW	11	(Belarus) Pyotr Kachura	(yellow card) 57'	(substituted off) 76'
Substitutes:
FW	12	(Belarus) Oleg Putilo		(substituted on) 76'
MF	13	(Belarus) Sergey Gotsmanov
FW	14	(Belarus) Sergey Baranovsky		(substituted on) 86'
DF	15	(Belarus) Vladimir Ostrikov	(yellow card) 77'	(substituted on) 46'
GK	16	(Belarus) Uladzimir Haew
Manager:
(Belarus) Veniamin Arzamastsev

FANDOK:
GK	1	(Belarus) Yury Svirkov
DF	2	(Belarus) Sergey Razumovich
DF	4	(Belarus) Igor Shustikov	(yellow card) 33'
DF	6	(Belarus) Andrei Khripach		(substituted off) 81'
DF	3	(Belarus) Oleg Cherepnyov
MF	5	(Belarus) Kirill Savostikov
MF	7	(Belarus) Eduard Gradoboyev		(substituted off) 86'
MF	9	(Belarus) Igor Gradoboyev
MF	8	(Belarus) Viktor Kukar
FW	11	(Belarus) Sergey Yaromko
FW	10	(Belarus) Sergey Omelyusik
Substitutes:
GK	12	(Belarus) Andrey Svirkov
MF	13	(Belarus) Sergey Kazak
FW	14	(Belarus) Vitaly Tarakanov		(substituted on) 81'
DF	15	(Belarus) Vladimir Mozolovsky
FW	16	(Belarus) Andrey Hlebasolaw
GK	17	(Belarus) Vladimir Ryzhchenko
MF	18	(Belarus) Vladimir Karpenko		(substituted on) 86'
Manager:
(Belarus) Ivan Savostikov
