= Eduard Koksharov =

Russian handball player (1975–2026)

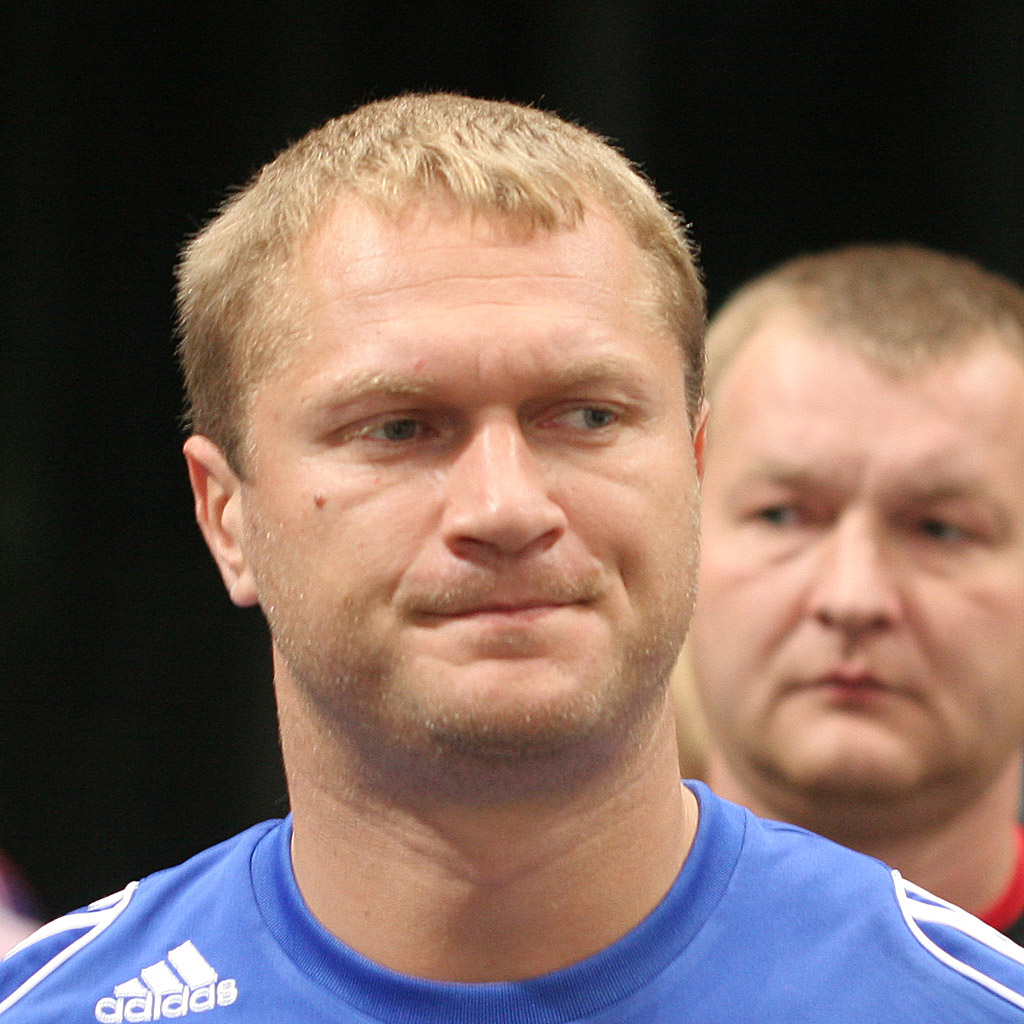
- Koksharov in 2008

Personal information
- Nationality: Russian
- Born: 4 November 1975 Krasnodar, Russian SFSR, Soviet Union
- Died: 31 March 2026 (aged 50) Ratamka, Minsk Region, Belarus
- Height: 1.85 m (6 ft 1 in)

Sport
- Sport: Handball
- Position: Left wing

Senior clubs
- Years: Team
- 19??–1999: SKIF Krasnodar
- 1999–2011: RK Celje
- 2011–2013: Chekhovskiye Medvedi
National team
Years	Team	Apps	(Gls)
1996–2012	Russia	226	(1110)

Teams managed
- –2016: SKIF Krasnodar
- 2016: ŽRK Vardar
- 2017–2020: Russia
- 2019: RK Vardar
- 2022–2023: Rostov-Don
- 2023–2026: HC Meshkov Brest
Medal record
Men's handball
Representing Russia
Olympic Games
Gold medal – first place	2000 Sydney	Team
Bronze medal – third place	2004 Athens	Team
World Championships
Gold medal – first place	1997 Japan	Team
Silver medal – second place	1999 Egypt	Team
European Championships
Silver medal – second place	2000 Croatia	Team

Eduard Aleksandrovich Koksharov (Russian: Эдуард Александрович Кокшаров, 4 November 1975 – 31 March 2026) was a Russian handball player and coach.

== Career ==
Koksharov played as a left winger. He retired from his national team in 2012. He came to Celje from SKIF Krasnodar in the 1999–2000 season, at the age of 23. His biggest achievements include winning the gold medal at the 1997 World Championships and winning the handball tournament at the 2000 Summer Olympics in Sydney, both with Russia. He was also the winner of the Champions League with Celje Pivovarna Laško in the 2003–04 season.

== Personal life and death ==
Koksharov died in Ratamka, Minsk Region, Belarus on 31 March 2026, at the age of 50.

His son Aleksandr Koksharov is a professional football player.

== Honors ==
- Olympic Games
  - 1 Gold medal (2000 Summer Olympics)
  - 1 Bronze medal (2004 Summer Olympics)
- European Championships
  - 1 Silver medal (2000 European Championship)
- World Championships
  - 1 Gold medal (1997 World Championship)
  - 1 Silver medal (1999 World Championship)
- World Junior Championships
  - 1 Gold medal (1995 World Junior Championship)
- All star team:
  - World Championships: 2001, 2003, 2005, 2007
  - European Championships: 2004, 2006
- Slovenian champion: 2000, 2001, 2003, 2004, 2005, 2006, 2007, 2008
- Slovenian Cup winner: 2000, 2001, 2004, 2006, 2007.

== See also ==
- List of men's handballers with 1000 or more international goals
