= Verstak =

Verstak (Cyrillic: Верстак) is a gender-neutral Slavic surname. It literally means a workbench in several Slavic languages and may refer to

- Dzmitry Vyarstak (born 1980), Belarusian football player
- Tania Verstak (born 1942), Russian-born Australian model and beauty queen
