= Ivan Savostikov =

Belarusian footballer

Personal information
- Full name: Ivan Ivanovich Savostikov
- Date of birth: 22 August 1941
- Place of birth: Minsk, Reichskommissariat Ostland
- Date of death: 19 July 2018 (aged 76)
- Height: 1.72 m (5 ft 8 in)
- Position: Defender

Youth career
- 1957–1958: FShM Minsk

Senior career*
Years	Team	Apps	(Gls)
1960	Sputnik Minsk		
1961–1969	Dinamo Minsk	249	(4)
1970	Neman Grodno	32	(0)
1971–1972	Gomselmash Gomel	45	(0)

Managerial career
- 1971–1972: Gomselmash Gomel (assistant)
- 1978–1986: Dinamo Minsk (assistant)
- 1986–1888: Dinamo Minsk
- 1992–1999: Belarus U21
- 1994: Fandok Bobruisk (caretaker)
- 1999: Belshina Bobruisk
- 2003–2004: Smena Minsk
- * Club domestic league appearances and goals

Ivan Ivanovich Savostikov (Russian: Иван Савостиков; 22 August 1941 – 19 July 2018) was a Soviet and Belarusian football player and coach.

== Early life ==
Savostikov was born in 1941 in Nazi-occupied Belarus. He was raised by his mother.

== Career ==
In 1961, Savostikov joined Dinamo Minsk. He was regarded as one of the club's most important players.
