= Eduard Demenkovets =

Belarusian footballer and coach

Personal information
- Date of birth: 1 May 1968 (age 58)
- Place of birth: Soligorsk, Belarusian SSR, Soviet Union
- Height: 1.76 m (5 ft 9 1/2 in)
- Position: Midfielder

Team information
- Current team: Gomel-SDYUShOR-8 (head coach)

Youth career
- 1982–1983: Shakhtyor Soligorsk
- 1983–1985: FShM Moscow

Senior career*
| Years | Team | Apps | (Gls) |
| 1985 | FShM Moscow | 3 | (0) |
| 1986–1988 | Shakhtyor Soligorsk | | |
| 1989–1993 | KIM Vitebsk | 165 | (40) |
| 1994–1995 | Dinamo Minsk | 41 | (4) |
| 1996–1997 | Vejle | 21 | (3) |
| 1997–1998 | Lokomotiv-96 Vitebsk | 41 | (7) |
| 1999–2000 | Gomel | 60 | (17) |
| 2001 | Gomel-2 | 4 | (1) |
| 2002–2003 | Vedrich-97 Rechitsa | 45 | (4) |
| 2003 | ZLiN Gomel | 15 | (1) |
| 2004–2006 | Gomel-2 | 62 | (9) |
| Total | | 457 | (86) |

International career
| 1992–1994 | Belarus | 4 | (0) |

Managerial career
- 2004–2006: Gomel-2
- 2007–: Gomel-SDYUShOR-8 (women)
- * Club domestic league appearances and goals

Eduard Demenkovets (Belarusian: Эдуард Дземенкавец; Russian: Эдуард Деменковец; born 1 May 1968) is a retired Belarusian professional footballer and Belarus international. His playing career suffered in late 2000 as a result of car crash he was involved in. He retired after playing several more seasons in lower leagues. Since 2007, he works as a head coach for women's club Gomel-SDYUShOR-8.

In addition to coaching a women's team, Demenkovets has played for and coached several futsal clubs (most notably BCh Gomel from 2009 till 2014). He also played for and coached Belarus national beach soccer team.

== Honours ==
Dinamo Minsk

- Belarusian Premier League champion: 1993–94, 1994–95
- Belarusian Cup winner: 1993–94

Lokomotiv-96 Vitebsk

- Belarusian Cup winner: 1997–98
