= Maksim Razumaw =

Belarusian footballer

Personal information
- Date of birth: 4 March 1977 (age 49)
- Place of birth: Vitebsk, Byelorussian SSR, Soviet Union
- Height: 1.81 m (5 ft 11 in)
- Position: Midfielder

Youth career
- 1994–1995: Ataka-Aura Minsk

Senior career*
Years	Team	Apps	(Gls)
1995–1998	Lokomotiv-96 Vitebsk	96	(25)
1995	→ Dvina-Belkon Novopolotsk (loan)	4	(1)
1996	→ Energetik Novolukoml (loan)	2	(2)
1998	Kareda Šiauliai	5	(0)
1999–2005	Gomel	189	(23)
2006–2009	Naftan Novopolotsk	89	(9)
2010	DSK Gomel	30	(6)
2011	Smorgon	12	(1)
2012–2014	Vitebsk	69	(8)
2015	Gomelzheldortrans	11	(0)
2015	Orsha	11	(1)

International career
1996–1999	Belarus U21	21	(5)
1996–1997	Belarus	2	(0)
- * Club domestic league appearances and goals as of 1 December 2015

Maksim Razumaw (Belarusian: Максім Разумаў; Russian: Максим Разумов; born 4 March 1977) is a Belarusian former professional footballer. Razumaw played for various Belarusian clubs till 2015, in 1997-1998 - for the Lithuanian club Kareda. After retiring, he worked as a youth football coach.

== Honours ==
Lokomotiv-96 Vitebsk

- Belarusian Cup winner: 1997–98

Gomel

- Belarusian Premier League champion: 2003
- Belarusian Cup winner: 2001–02

Naftan Novopolotsk

- Belarusian Cup winner: 2008–09
