= Fedorchenko =

Fedorchenko (Ukrainian: Федорченко) is a Ukrainian surname. Notable people with the surname include:

- Aleksey Fedorchenko (born 1966), Russian film director
- Artem Fedorchenko (born 1980), Ukrainian footballer
- Sergei Fedorchenko (born 1974), Kazakhstani gymnast
