= Yuri Shukanov =

Belarusian footballer (born 1971)

Yuri Shukanov Юры Шуканаў
Personal information
- Full name: Yuri Vladimirovich Shukanov
- Date of birth: 10 March 1971 (age 55)
- Place of birth: Minsk, Belarusian SSR
- Height: 1.75 m (5 ft 9 in)
- Positions: Attacking midfielder; forward

Youth career
- 1988–1989: Dinamo Minsk

Senior career*
Years	Team	Apps	(Gls)
1989–1991	KIM Vitebsk	101	(14)
1992	Dinamo-2 Minsk	16	(14)
1992–1994	Dinamo Minsk	55	(21)
1994–1995	Maccabi Tel Aviv	28	(9)
1995	Dinamo Minsk	15	(5)
1996–1997	Baltika Kaliningrad	36	(3)
1997	KAMAZ-Chally Naberezhnye Chelny	18	(7)
1998–2000	Uralan Elista	61	(6)
2000–2001	Fakel Voronezh	38	(5)
2002–2003	Dynamo-SPb St. Petersburg	34	(10)
2003	Kairat	14	(5)
2004	Dinamo Minsk	24	(9)

International career
1993–1995	Belarus	6	(0)

Managerial career
- 2004–2005: Dinamo Minsk
- 2008–2009: Dinamo Minsk (director)
- 2010–2012: Belarus U21
- 2013–2014: Dinamo Minsk (director)
- * Club domestic league appearances and goals

Yuri Vladimirovich Shukanov (Belarusian: Юры Уладзіміравіч Шуканаў; Russian: Юрий Владимирович Шуканов; born 10 March 1971) is a Belarusian professional football coach and former player. He made his professional debut in the Soviet Second League in 1989 for KIM Vitebsk.

== Honours ==
=== As a player ===
Dinamo Minsk

- Belarusian Premier League: 1992–93, 1993–94, 1995, 2004
- Belarusian Cup: 1993–94

Maccabi Tel Aviv

- Israeli Premier League: 1994–95

Kairat Almaty

- Kazakhstan Cup: 2003

=== As a coach ===
- Belarusian Premier League: 2004
