= Aleksandr Sokolov (footballer) =

Russian footballer

Aleksandr Sokolov Александр Соколов
Personal information
- Full name: Aleksandr Aleksandrovich Sokolov
- Date of birth: 4 November 1975 (age 50)
- Place of birth: Sudzha, Kursk Oblast, Soviet Union
- Height: 1.76 m (5 ft 9 1/2 in)
- Position: Forward

Senior career*
Years	Team	Apps	(Gls)
1995–1996	Avangard Kursk	60	(6)
1997	CSK VVS-Kristall Smolensk		
1998	Naftan-Devon Novopolotsk	5	(0)
1999–2000	Magnit Zheleznogorsk		(25)
2001–2003	Salyut-Energia Belgorod	88	(35)
2003	Arsenal Tula	12	(2)
2004–2005	Darida Minsk Raion	38	(17)
2005	Ironi Kiryat Shmona		
2006–2009	Magnit Zheleznogorsk	84	(45)
- * Club domestic league appearances and goals

Aleksandr Aleksandrovich Sokolov (Russian: Александр Александрович Соколов; born 4 November 1975) is a retired Russian professional footballer. He played in Belarusian Premier League clubs Naftan-Devon Novopolotsk and Darida Minsk Raion as well for several Russian lower-division clubs.
