= Artem Galyak =

Belarusian footballer

Personal information
- Date of birth: 29 August 1995 (age 31)
- Place of birth: Kalinkovichi, Gomel Oblast, Belarus
- Height: 1.79 m (5 ft 10 1/2 in)
- Position: Forward

Team information
- Current team: Vertikal Kalinkovichi
- Number: 83

Youth career
- 2011–2012: PMC Postavy
- 2012–2014: Slavia Mozyr

Senior career*
Years	Team	Apps	(Gls)
2014–2017	Slavia Mozyr	0	(0)
2014	→ Vertikal Kalinkovichi (loan)	3	(0)
2015	→ Gomelzheldortrans (loan)	10	(0)
2017	Naftan Novopolotsk	6	(0)
2018	Granit Mikashevichi	28	(4)
2019–2020	Khimik Svetlogorsk	35	(1)
2021–	Vertikal Kalinkovichi	1	(0)

Managerial career
- 2021–: Vertikal Kalinkovichi
- * Club domestic league appearances and goals as of 31 December 2021

Artem Galyak (Belarusian: Арцём Галяк; Russian: Артём Галяк; born 29 August 1995) is a Belarusian professional footballer. As of 2021, he plays for and coaches Vertikal Kalinkovichi (as a player-manager).
