= Alyaksandr Novik =

Belarusian footballer (born 1975)

Personal information
- Date of birth: 25 July 1975 (age 51)
- Height: 1.75 m (5 ft 9 in)
- Position: Midfielder

Senior career*
Years	Team	Apps	(Gls)
1993–2009	Shakhtyor Soligorsk	247	(16)
- * Club domestic league appearances and goals

Alyaksandr Novik (born 25 July 1975) is a retired Belarusian footballer. He spent all his professional career at Shakhtyor Soligorsk from 1993 until 2009.

== Honours ==
Shakhtyor Soligorsk

- Belarusian Premier League champion: 2005
- Belarusian Cup winner: 2003–04
