= Vadzim Boyka =

Belarusian footballer

Personal information
- Date of birth: 3 December 1978 (age 47)
- Place of birth: Bereza
- Height: 1.76 m (5 ft 9 1/2 in)
- Position: Forward

Senior career*
Years	Team	Apps	(Gls)
1997–2000	Keramik Bereza	106	(49)
2001–2002	Dinamo Brest	49	(21)
2003–2004	Shakhtyor Soligorsk	28	(5)
2004–2006	Dinamo Brest	39	(12)
2007	Granit Mikashevichi	24	(5)
2008	Dinamo Brest	22	(3)
2009	Torpedo Zhodino	24	(6)
2010–2011	Granit Mikashevichi	58	(18)
- * Club domestic league appearances and goals

Vadzim Boyka (Belarusian: Вадзім Бойка; Russian: Вадим Бойко; born 3 December 1978) is a retired Belarusian professional footballer.

== Honours ==
Shakhtyor Soligorsk

- Belarusian Cup winner: 2003–04
