= Yuri Khusyainov =

Russian footballer

Personal information
- Full name: Yuri Rafailevich Khusyainov
- Date of birth: 30 June 1983 (age 43)
- Place of birth: Moscow, Soviet Union
- Height: 1.85 m (6 ft 1 in)
- Position: Midfielder

Youth career
- 2001–2003: Lokomotiv Moscow

Senior career*
Years	Team	Apps	(Gls)
2001–2003	Lokomotiv Moscow	0	(0)
2004	Gomel	17	(1)
2005	Lokomotiv Kaluga	8	(0)
2005–2007	Baltika Kaliningrad	58	(1)
2008	Dynamo-Voronezh	19	(0)
2009	Nara-ShBFR Naro-Fominsk	17	(1)
- * Club domestic league appearances and goals

Yuri Rafailevich Khusyainov (Russian: Юрий Рафаильевич Хусяинов; born 30 June 1983) is a former Russian professional footballer.

== Club career ==
He made his debut for FC Lokomotiv Moscow on 2 April 2004 in the Russian Premier League Cup game against FC Torpedo-Metallurg Moscow.

He played two seasons in the Russian Football National League for FC Baltika Kaliningrad.
