= Vladislav Borisenko =

Belarusian professional footballer

Personal information
- Date of birth: 5 March 1997 (age 29)
- Place of birth: Kalinkovichi, Gomel Oblast, Belarus
- Height: 1.80 m (5 ft 11 in)
- Position: Defender

Team information
- Current team: Vertikal Kalinkovichi

Youth career
- 2010–2013: Minsk
- 2014–2016: Dinamo Minsk

Senior career*
Years	Team	Apps	(Gls)
2016–2017	Slavia Mozyr	16	(0)
2017	→ Naftan Novopolotsk (loan)	3	(0)
2018	Lida	7	(0)
2018	Chist	4	(0)
2019	Slonim-2017	11	(0)
2020	Granit Mikashevichi	15	(1)
2021–	Vertikal Kalinkovichi	24	(2)

International career
2017	Belarus U21	1	(0)
- * Club domestic league appearances and goals as of 31 December 2023

Vladislav Borisenko (Belarusian: Уладзіслаў Барысенка; Russian: Владислав Борисенко; born 5 March 1997) is a Belarusian professional footballer who plays for Vertikal Kalinkovichi.
