= Andrey Harawtsow =

Belarusian footballer and manager

Personal information
- Date of birth: 2 April 1981 (age 45)
- Place of birth: Gomel, Belarusian SSR
- Height: 1.88 m (6 ft 2 in)
- Position: Defender

Team information
- Current team: Gomel (manager)

Youth career
- 1999–2001: Gomel

Senior career*
Years	Team	Apps	(Gls)
1999–2006	Gomel	62	(6)
1999	→ Gomel-2	10	(1)
2000	→ ZLiN Gomel (loan)	21	(1)
2006	Lokomotiv Minsk	9	(0)
2007–2010	Vitebsk	45	(5)
2011	Granit Mikashevichi	24	(0)
2012	Vitebsk	23	(0)
2013	Khimik Svetlogorsk	25	(0)
2014–2016	Gomelzheldortrans	18	(0)

Managerial career
- 2018: Lokomotiv Gomel
- 2018–2020: Lokomotiv Gomel (assistant)
- 2020–2023: Lokomotiv Gomel
- 2023–: Gomel
- * Club domestic league appearances and goals

Andrey Harawtsow (Belarusian: Андрэй Гараўцоў; Russian: Андрей Горовцов; born 2 April 1981) is a Belarusian professional football manager and former player. As of 2023, he manages for Gomel.

== Honours ==
Gomel

- Belarusian Premier League champion: 2003
- Belarusian Cup winner: 2001–02
