= Zhdanovichy rural council =

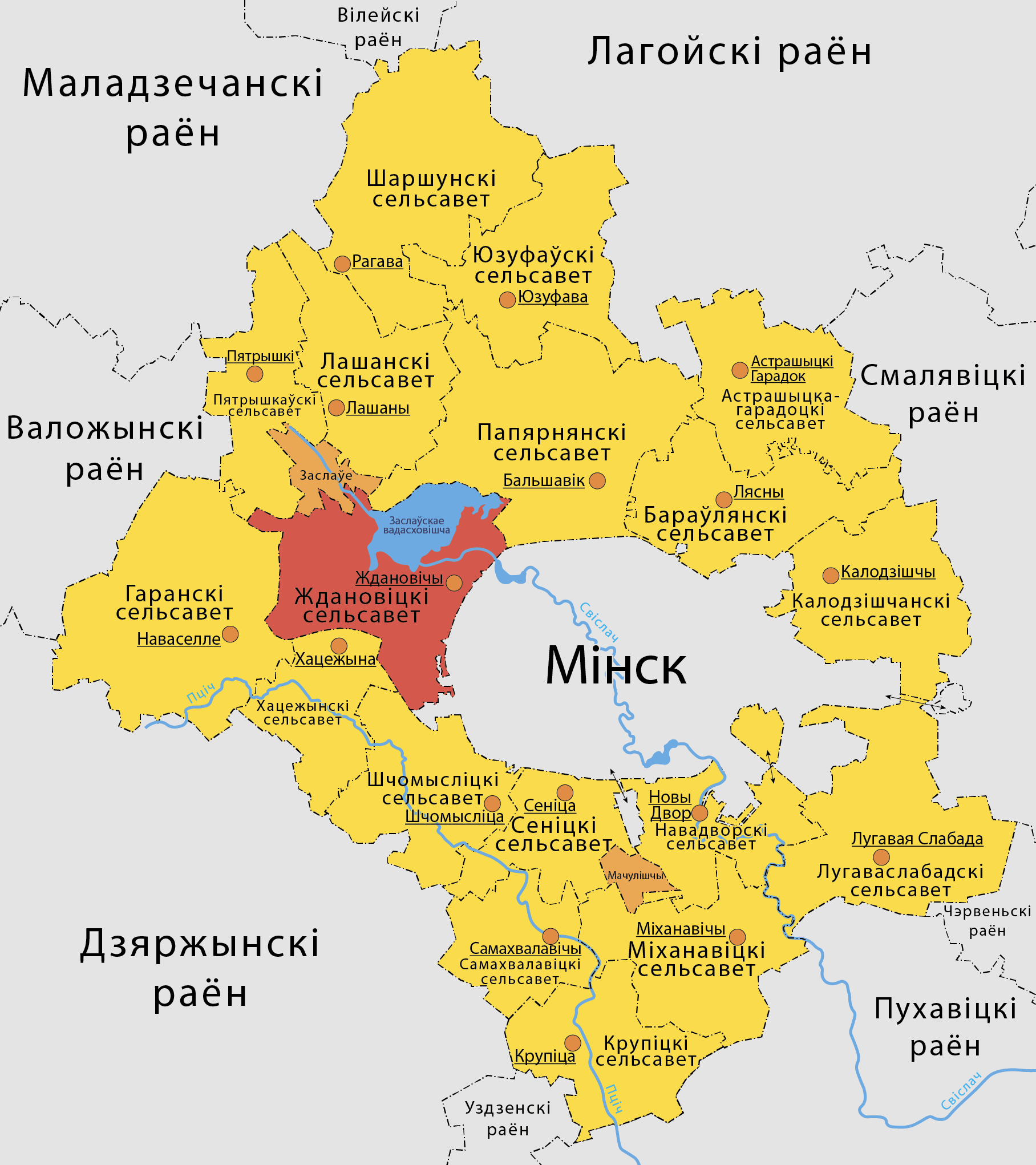
Map of Minsk District

Zhdanovichy rural council (Belarusian: Ждановіцкі сельсавет; Russian: Ждановичский сельсовет) is a lower-level subdivision (selsoviet) of Minsk district, Minsk region, Belarus. Its administrative center is the agrotown of Zhdanovichy.

== Rural localities ==
The populations are from the 2009 Belarusian census (14,623 total) and 2019 Belarusian census (19,643 total)

Russian name	Belarusian name	Pop. 2009	Pop. 2019
д Воловщина (Volovshchina)	в Валоўшчына (Valowshchyna)	34	5
д Гонолес	в Ганалес	62	69
д Дегтярёвка	в Дзегцяроўка	321	411
аг Ждановичи	аг Ждановічы	7909	9652
д Заречье-1	в Зарэчча 1	4	10
д Зелёная	в Зялёная	98	103
д Каменная Горка	в Каменная Горка	69	153
д Качино	в Качына	182	198
д Крыжовка	в Крыжоўка	197	200
д Ляховщина	в Ляхаўшчына	118	98
д Подгорье	в Падгор'е	26	50
аг Ратомка (Ratomka)	аг Ратамка (Ratamka)	4456	6061
д Тарасово	в Тарасава	1116	2608
д Ярково	в Яркова	31	25
