= Dmytro Vorobey =

Ukrainian footballer

Personal information
- Full name: Dmytro Serhiyovych Vorobey
- Date of birth: 10 May 1985 (age 41)
- Place of birth: Mozyr, Belarusian SSR, Soviet Union
- Height: 1.72 m (5 ft 8 in)
- Position: Midfielder

Youth career
- 2000–2001: RUOR Minsk

Senior career*
| Years | Team | Apps | (Gls) |
| 2000 | Mozyr | 4 | (0) |
| 2001 | RUOR Minsk | 5 | (1) |
| 2001–2002 | Borysfen-2 Boryspil | 10 | (6) |
| 2002–2007 | Dynamo Kyiv | 0 | (0) |
| 2002–2005 | → Dynamo-2 Kyiv | 80 | (20) |
| 2003–2004 | → Dynamo-3 Kyiv | 2 | (0) |
| 2005 | → Arsenal Kyiv (loan) | 2 | (0) |
| 2005–2006 | → Dynamo-2 Kyiv | 42 | (13) |
| 2007 | → Zorya Luhansk (loan) | 10 | (2) |
| 2007–2008 | Zorya Luhansk | 21 | (3) |
| 2008–2009 | Illichivets Mariupol | 29 | (5) |
| 2009–2011 | Kryvbas Kryvyi Rih | 6 | (1) |
| 2011–2012 | Naftovyk-Ukrnafta Okhtyrka | 19 | (1) |
| 2012 | Obolon Kyiv | 14 | (4) |
| 2013 | Poltava | 11 | (0) |
| 2014–2015 | Kolos Zachepylivka | | |
| 2016–2019 | Slavia Mozyr | 32 | (2) |
| 2023 | Vertikal Kalinkovichi | 1 | (0) |

International career
| 2001–2002 | Ukraine U17 | 7 | (2) |
| 2005 | Ukraine U19 | 1 | (0) |
| 2003–2006 | Ukraine U21 | 25 | (3) |

Managerial career
- 2020–2022: Slavia Mozyr (youth)
- 2022: Slavia Mozyr (reserves)
Medal record
Men's football
Representing Ukraine
UEFA European Under-19 Championship
| Bronze medal – third place | 2004 Switzerland |
- * Club domestic league appearances and goals

Dmytro Serhiyovych Vorobey (Ukrainian: Дмитрo Сергійович Воробей; born 10 May 1985) is a Belarusian-born Ukrainian former footballer.

== Career ==
He played for Ukraine at 2002 UEFA European Under-17 Championship, 2004 UEFA European Under-19 Championship and 2005 FIFA World Youth Championship.
