= Anatoly Tikhonchik =

Belarusian footballer

Personal information
- Date of birth: 27 January 1976 (age 50)
- Place of birth: Minsk, Belarusian SSR
- Height: 1.82 m (5 ft 11 1/2 in)
- Position: Forward

Youth career
- SDYuShOR-5 Minsk

Senior career*
Years	Team	Apps	(Gls)
1993	Rada Kletsk		
1994–1995	Kardan-Flyers Grodno	22	(2)
1997	Santanas Samokhvalovichi	8	(5)
1997	Neman Stolbtsy	6	(7)
1998–2004	Shakhtyor Soligorsk	161	(49)
2005	Gomel	22	(3)
2006–2007	Neman Grodno	24	(2)
2007	→ Granit Mikashevichi (loan)	13	(4)
2007	→ Belshina Bobruisk (loan)	13	(4)
2008–2009	Veras Nesvizh	44	(21)
2010	Beloozyorsk		
2012–2013	Neman Stolbtsy		
2014	Belita-Viteks Uzda	24	(3)
- * Club domestic league appearances and goals

Anatoly Tikhonchik (Belarusian: Анатоль Ціхончык; Russian: Анатолий Тихончик; born 21 January 1976) is a retired Belarusian professional footballer who was a prolific striker of the Belarusian League in 2000s.

== Honours ==
Shakhtyor Soligorsk

- Belarusian Cup winner: 2003–04
