= Anatoly Budayev =

Belarusian footballer

Personal information
- Date of birth: 31 March 1969
- Place of birth: Borisov, Byelorussian SSR, Soviet Union
- Date of death: 18 July 2013 (aged 44)
- Place of death: Soligorsk, Belarus
- Height: 1.88 m (6 ft 2 in)
- Position: Defender

Senior career*
Years	Team	Apps	(Gls)
1992–1995	Fomalgaut Borisov	113	(10)
1996–1997	Torpedo Zhodino	29	(4)
1998	BATE Borisov	6	(0)
1998–2006	Shakhtyor Soligorsk	196	(4)
- * Club domestic league appearances and goals

Anatoly Budayev (Belarusian: Анатоль Будаеў; Russian: Анатолий Будаев; 31 March 1969 – 18 July 2013) was a Belarusian footballer. He spent the majority of his career at Shakhtyor Soligorsk, which he helped to win the champions title in 2005 and Belarusian Cup in 2004 and which he also captained from 2004 until 2005.

After retirement Budayev worked at Belaruskali. He died on 18 July 2013.

== Honours ==
Shakhtyor Soligorsk

- Belarusian Premier League champion: 2005
- Belarusian Cup winner: 2003–04
