= Andrey Syarohin =

Belarusian footballer (born 1976)

Personal information
- Full name: Andrey Alyaksandrovich Syarohin
- Date of birth: 15 August 1976 (age 50)
- Place of birth: Yevpatoria, Ukrainian SSR
- Height: 1.85 m (6 ft 1 in)
- Position: Forward

Youth career
- SDYuShOR-5 Brest

Senior career*
Years	Team	Apps	(Gls)
1994	Zarya Yazyl	3	(0)
1995–1996	Stroitel Starye Dorogi	34	(7)
1996	Neman Grodno	20	(7)
1997	Tyumen	4	(0)
1997	Dinamo Brest	6	(0)
1998	Chornomorets Odesa	10	(0)
1998	Saturn Ramenskoye	1	(0)
1999	Spartak-Chukotka Moscow	32	(0)
2000	Kristall Smolensk	6	(1)
2001–2002	Dinamo Minsk	21	(3)
2002–2003	Shakhtyor Soligorsk	33	(2)
2004	Oryol	11	(0)
2004	Vostok	19	(0)
2005	Zhetysu	25	(1)
2006	SKA-Energiya Khabarovsk	8	(0)
- * Club domestic league appearances and goals

Andrey Alyaksandrovich Syarohin (Belarusian: Андрэй Аляксандравіч Сярогін; Russian: Андрей Александрович Серёгин, Andrei Aleksandrovich Seryogin; born 15 August 1976) is a former Belarusian football player.

== Honours ==
Shakhtyor Soligorsk

- Belarusian Cup winner: 2003–04
