= Aleksandr Kuznetsov (footballer, born 1951) =

Russian footballer and coach

Personal information
- Full name: Aleksandr Dmitriyevich Kuznetsov
- Date of birth: 15 February 1951 (age 75)
- Place of birth: Tula, Russian SFSR
- Position: Midfielder

Senior career*
Years	Team	Apps	(Gls)
1968–1970	Metallurg Tula	41	(6)
1970–1977	CSKA Moscow	49	(3)
1974	Volgar Astrakhan	11	(0)
1974–1977	CSKA Moscow	40	(2)

Managerial career
- 1989–1994: CSKA Moscow (assistant)
- 1997–1998: Slavia Mozyr (assistant)
- 1998–2000: Slavia Mozyr
- 2000–2001: Gomel
- 2001–2003: CSKA Moscow (assistant)
- 2001: CSKA Moscow (caretaker)
- 2004: Salyut-Energia Belgorod
- 2004–2005: Gomel
- 2005–2006: CSKA Moscow (assistant)
- 2009: Varyagi Moscow (amateur)
- * Club domestic league appearances and goals

Aleksandr Dmitriyevich Kuznetsov (Russian: Александр Дмитриевич Кузнецов; born 15 February 1951) is a Russian professional football coach and a former player.
