= Artsyom Hancharyk =

Belarusian footballer

Personal information
- Date of birth: 13 April 1980 (age 46)
- Place of birth: Minsk, Belarusian SSR
- Height: 1.74 m (5 ft 9 in)
- Position: Forward

Youth career
- 1996–1997: Smena Minsk

Senior career*
Years	Team	Apps	(Gls)
1997	Smena-BATE Minsk	1	(0)
1998–2002	BATE Borisov	76	(27)
1999	→ Smena-BATE Minsk	9	(4)
2000	→ RShVSM-Olympia Minsk	10	(5)
2003	Belshina Bobruisk	27	(6)
2004–2007	Shakhtyor Soligorsk	94	(32)
2008–2009	Vitebsk	36	(8)
2009	Granit Mikashevichi	10	(1)
2010	Gomel	7	(0)
2010	Neman Grodno	5	(0)
2011	Partizan Minsk	27	(2)
2018	Molodechno-DYuSSh-4	9	(1)

International career
2000	Belarus U21	1	(0)
- * Club domestic league appearances and goals as of 31 December 2018

Artsyom Hancharyk (Belarusian: Арцём Ганчарык; Russian: Артём Гончарик; born 13 April 1980) is a Belarusian former footballer.

== Career ==
Hancharyk started his career with Smena-BATE Minsk.

== Honours ==
BATE Borisov

- Belarusian Premier League champion: 1999, 2002

Shakhtyor Soligorsk

- Belarusian Premier League champion: 2005
- Belarusian Cup: 2003–04
