= Dmitry Rubnenko =

Belarusian footballer

Personal information
- Date of birth: 30 July 1983 (age 43)
- Place of birth: Minsk
- Height: 1.76 m (5 ft 9 1/2 in)
- Position: Attacking midfielder

Senior career*
Years	Team	Apps	(Gls)
2000–2002	Zvezda-VA-BGU Minsk	59	(7)
2003–2005	BATE Borisov	53	(7)
2006–2008	Vitebsk	38	(4)
2008	→ Savit Mogilev (loan)	6	(0)

International career
1999	Belarus U17	3	(0)
2000–2001	Belarus U19	8	(2)
2002–2005	Belarus U21	13	(2)
- * Club domestic league appearances and goals

Dmitry Rubnenko (Belarusian: Дзмітрый Рубненка; Russian: Дмитрий Рубненко; born 30 July 1983) is a retired Belarusian footballer. He ended his career at the age of 25 due to persistent injuries.

== Honours ==
BATE Borisov

- Belarusian Cup winner: 2005–06
