= Ruslan Usaw =

Belarusian footballer

Personal information
- Date of birth: 4 August 1979 (age 47)
- Place of birth: Gomel, Belarusian SSR
- Height: 1.78 m (5 ft 10 in)
- Position: Forward

Youth career
- ZLiN Gomel

Senior career*
Years	Team	Apps	(Gls)
2000	ZLiN Gomel	27	(5)
2001–2004	Gomel	44	(9)
2001–2002	→ ZLiN Gomel (loan)	42	(22)
2005–2008	Vitebsk	75	(26)
2009	Naftan Novopolotsk	5	(0)
2009	Belshina Bobruisk	12	(5)
2010	Vitebsk	26	(3)
2011	DSK Gomel	14	(2)
2012	Khimik Svetlogorsk	22	(3)
- * Club domestic league appearances and goals

Ruslan Usaw (Belarusian: Руслан Усаў; Russian: Руслан Усов; born 4 August 1979) is a retired Belarusian professional footballer.

== Honours ==
Gomel

- Belarusian Premier League champion: 2003

Naftan Novopolotsk

- Belarusian Cup winner: 2008–09
