= Andrey Yusipets =

Belarusian footballer and coach

Personal information
- Date of birth: 16 April 1967 (age 59)
- Place of birth: Gomel, Belarusian SSR
- Position: Forward

Team information
- Current team: Gomel (youth coach)

Senior career*
Years	Team	Apps	(Gls)
1988–1994	Gomselmash Gomel	210	(56)
1994	ZLiN Gomel	3	(3)
1994–1997	Alemannia Aachen	65	(6)
1997–2001	Gomel	98	(37)
2001–2004	Vedrich-97 Rechytsa	49	(23)

International career
1994–1995	Belarus	11	(0)

Managerial career
- 2005–2008: Gomel (assistant)
- 2008–2009: Gomel
- 2009–: Gomel (youth)
- * Club domestic league appearances and goals

Andrey Yusipets (Belarusian: Андрэй Юсіпец; Russian: Андрей Михайлович Юсипец; born 16 April 1967) is a Belarusian professional football coach and a former player. As of 2013, he is a youth coach at FC Gomel.
