= Ratamka =

Agrotown in Minsk Region, Belarus

Ratamka Ратамка (Belarusian) Ратомка (Russian)
- Agrotown
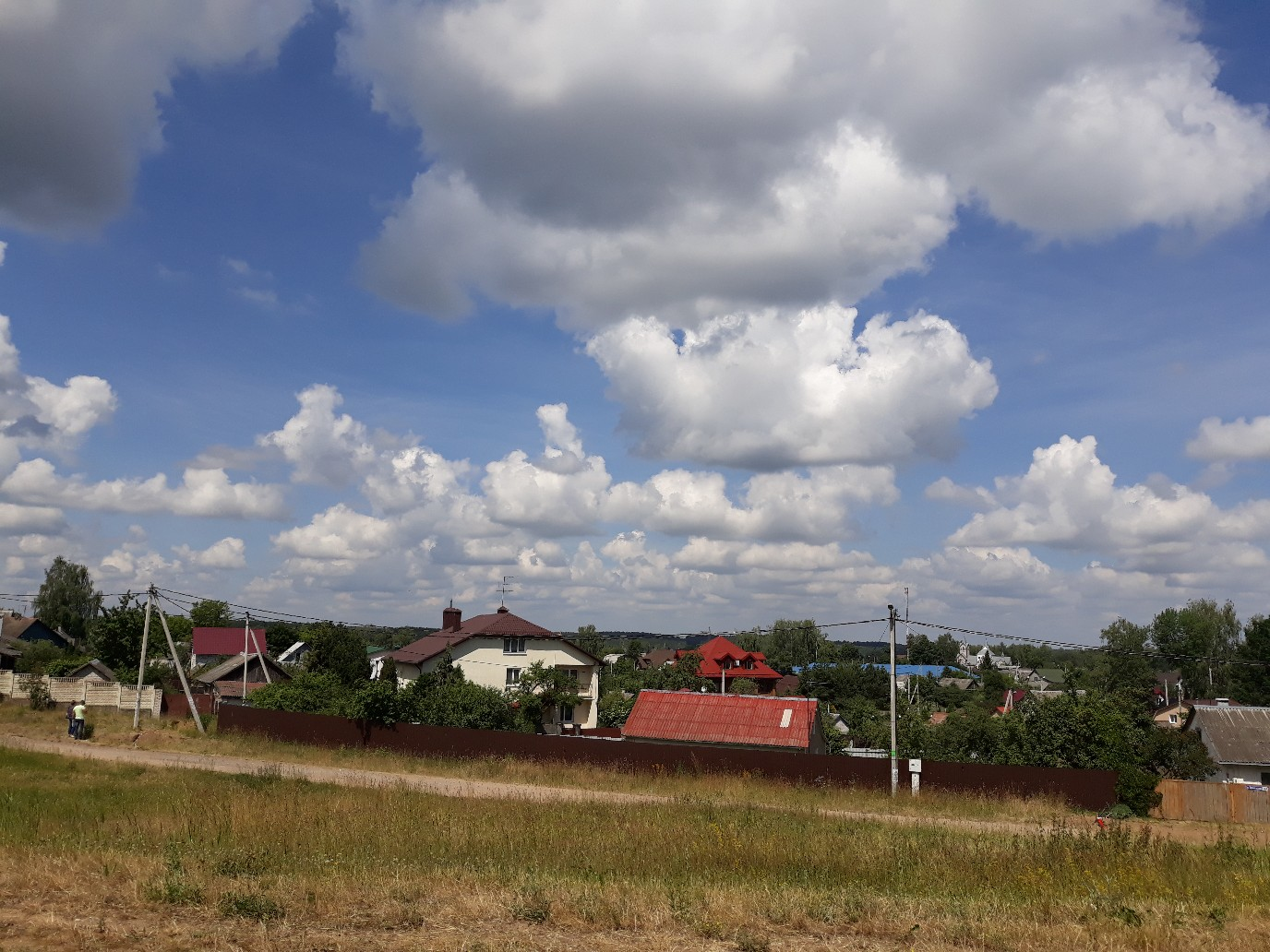

- Location within Belarus
- Coordinates: 53°56′N 27°21′E
- Country: Belarus
- Region: Minsk Region
- District: Minsk District

Population (2010)
  - Total: 4,830
- Time zone: UTC+3 (MSK)

Ratamka (Belarusian: Ратамка; Russian: Ратомка, romanized: Ratomka) is an agrotown in Minsk District, Minsk Region, Belarus. It is administratively part of Zhdanovichy rural council. It is located five kilometres (3.1 mi) west of the capital Minsk. In 2010, it had a population of 4,830.
