= FC Bobruisk =

Bobruisk
- Full name: Football Club Bobruisk
- Founded: 1984
- Dissolved: 1995
- Ground: Spartak Stadium, Bobruisk, Belarus

FC Bobruisk is a defunct Belarusian football club from Bobruisk. They disbanded in 1995.

== History ==
The team was formed in late 1984 as Traktor Bobruisk. During Soviet years, they played in the Belarusian SSR league.

From 1992 until 1995, the team was playing in the Belarusian Premier League. In late 1992, they changed name to Fandok Bobruisk and 1995 to FC Bobruisk. After unsuccessful 1995 season, they finished last with only 2 points in 15 games. The team was disbanded.

=== Name changes ===
- 1984: Founded as FC Traktor Bobruisk
- 1992: Renamed to FC Fandok Bobruisk
- 1995: Renamed to FC Bobruisk

== Honours ==
- Belarusian Cup
  - Runners-up (1): 1994

== League and Cup history ==
Season	Level	Pos	Pld	W	D	L	Goals	Points	Domestic Cup	Notes
1992	1st	4	15	8	3	4	13–10	19	Quarterfinals	
1992–93	1st	6	32	15	10	7	37–20	40	Round of 32	
1993–94	1st	5	30	13	7	10	32–25	33	Runners-up	
1994–95	1st	12	30	8	12	10	31–36	28	Round of 32	
1995	1st	16	15	0	2	13	6–54	2	Round of 32^{1}	Relegated, disbanded

- ^{1} Withdrew before the first game.

== European results ==
- Q = Qualification

Season	Competition	Round	Country	Team	Score
1994–95	Cup Winners' Cup	Q	(Albania)	SK Tirana	4–1, 0–3
