= Alyaksandr Alhavik =

Belarusian footballer

Personal information
- Date of birth: 18 April 1982 (age 44)
- Place of birth: Molodechno, Minsk Oblast
- Height: 1.84 m (6 ft 1/2 in)
- Position: Defender

Youth career
- 2001–2002: Molodechno-2000

Senior career*
Years	Team	Apps	(Gls)
2002–2004	Molodechno-2000	44	(0)
2004–2007	Khimik Svetlogorsk	86	(7)
2008–2010	Smorgon	46	(1)
2010	Granit Mikashevichi	10	(0)
2011	Khimik Svetlogorsk	13	(1)
2011	Gorodeya	6	(0)
2012	Zabudova Molodechno	25	(2)
2015–2017	Molodechno-DYuSSh-4	52	(6)
- * Club domestic league appearances and goals as of 31 December 2017

Alyaksandr Alhavik (Belarusian: Аляксандр Альхавік; Russian: Александр Альховик; born 18 April 1982) is a Belarusian former professional footballer.
