= Dinamo-Yuni Stadium =

Football stadium in Belarus

Dinamo-Yuni Stadium Dynama-Yuni Stadium
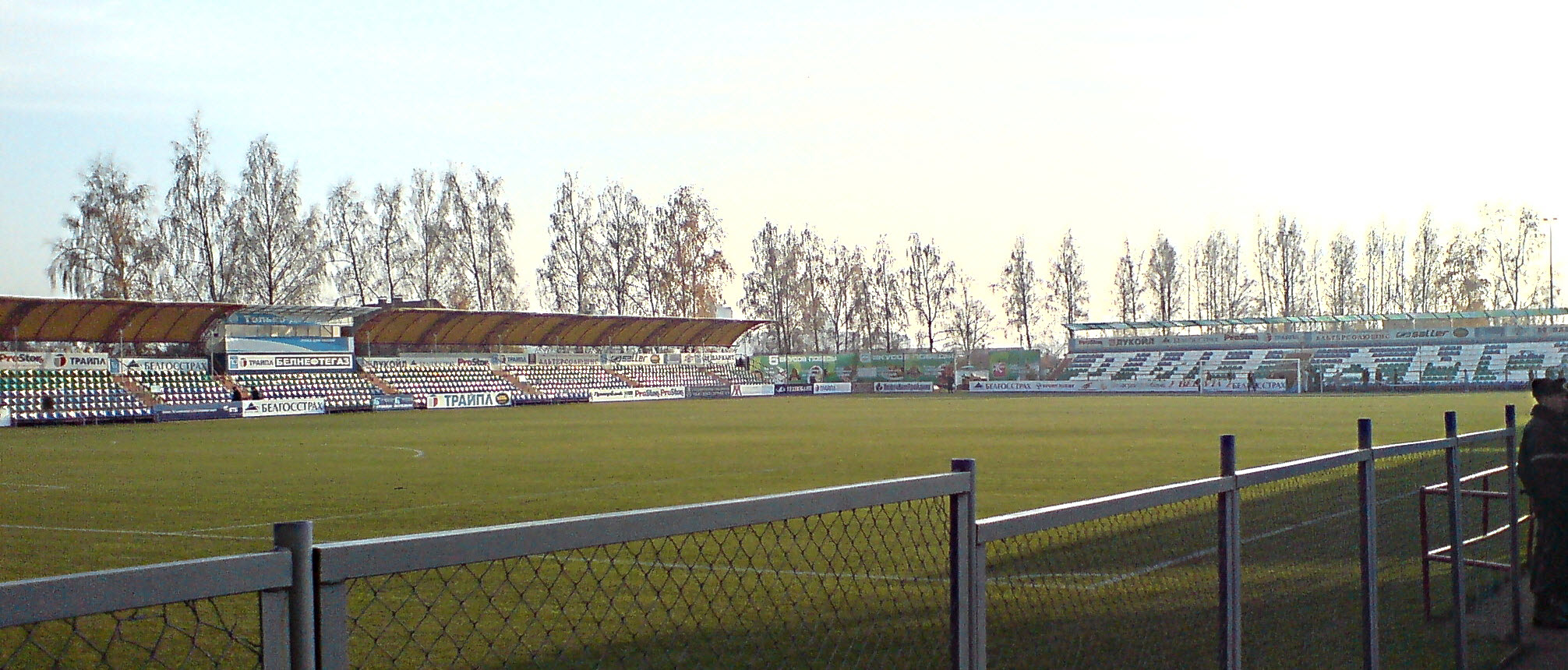
- Interactive map of Dinamo-Yuni Stadium; Dynama-Yuni Stadium
- Location: Minsk, Belarus
- Coordinates: 53.9044393°N 27.4165535°E
- Owner: FC Dinamo Minsk
- Capacity: 5,131
- Surface: Grass

Construction
- Opened: 2000
- Renovated: 2013–2019

Tenants
- Darida Minsk Raion (2000–2008); Dinamo Minsk (2009–2012)

Dinamo-Yuni Stadium or Dynama-Yuni (Belarusian: Дынама-Юні) is a football stadium in Minsk, Belarus. It is currently used for football matches and is the home stadium of FC Dinamo Minsk. The stadium holds 5,131 people and was opened in 2000.

Until 2008, the stadium was named Darida Stadium and was a home ground for FC Darida Minsk Raion. After the team's dissolution in late 2008, the stadium was bought by Dinamo Minsk and renamed to its current name, Dinamo-Yuni Stadium. Stadium's original capacity was 3,905 seats.

In early 2013, the stadium was closed for the renovation. It was reopened on 3 September 2021 with increased capacity.

== Sectors ==
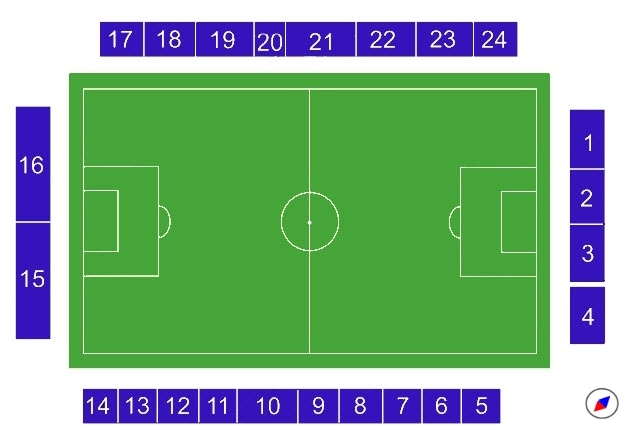
