= Zhdanovichy, Minsk district =

Agrotown in Minsk Region, Belarus

Zhdanovichy Ждановічы (Belarusian) Ждановичи (Russian)
- Agrotown
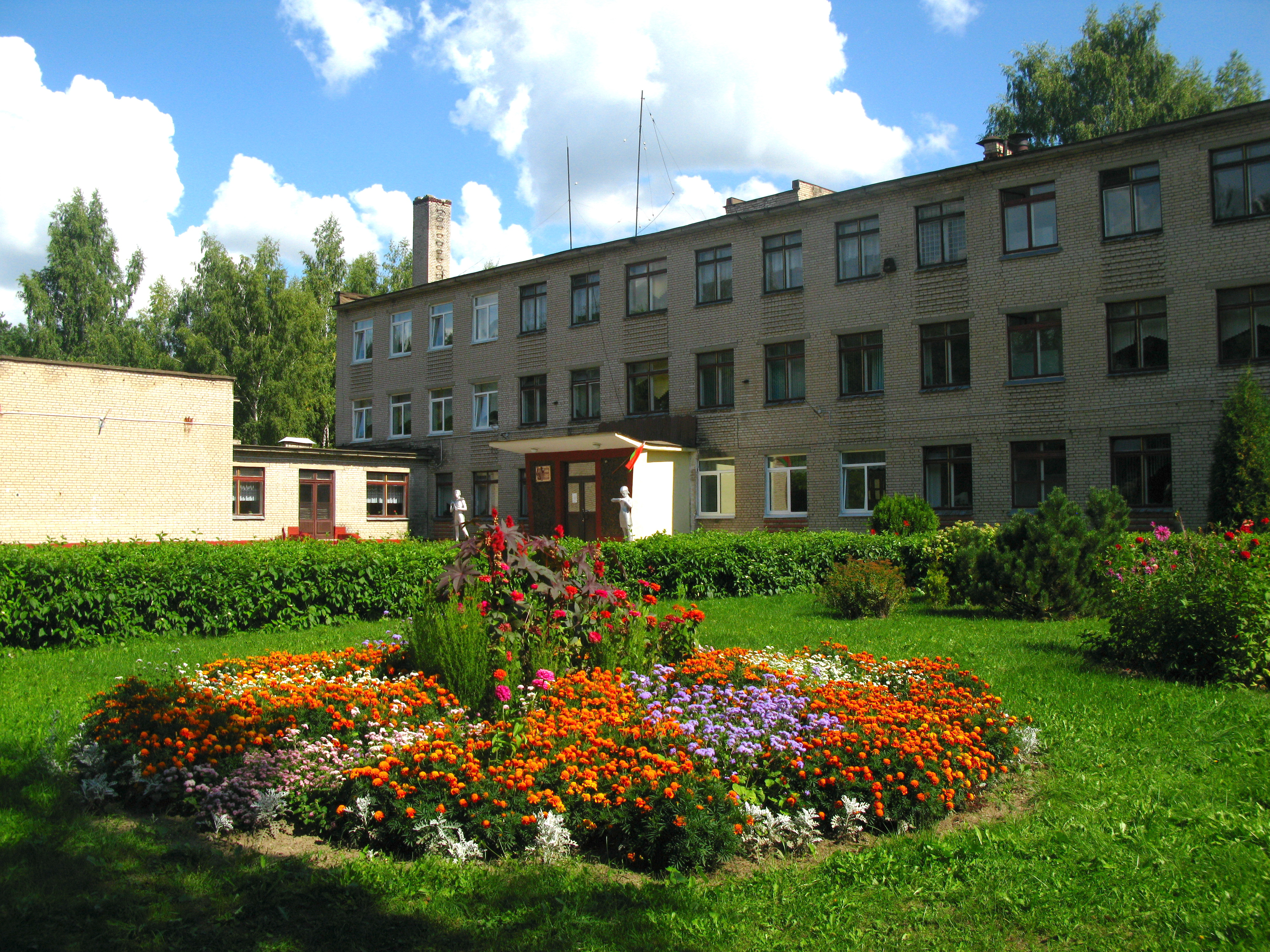

- Location within Belarus
- Coordinates: 53°56′48″N 27°25′26″E
- Country: Belarus
- Region: Minsk Region
- District: Minsk District

Population (2023)
  - Total: 10,298
- Time zone: UTC+3 (MSK)

Zhdanovichy (Belarusian: Ждановічы, romanized: Ždanovičy; Russian: Ждановичи, romanized: Zhdanovichi) is an agrotown in Minsk District, Minsk Region, Belarus. It serves as the administrative center of Zhdanovichy rural council. It is located one kilometre (0.62 mi) from the Minsk Ring Road, northwest of the capital Minsk. In 1997, it had a population of 5,669. In 2010, it had a population of 7,815. As of 2023, it has a population of 10,298.
