= Artem Fedorchenko =

Ukrainian footballer

Personal information
- Full name: Artem Fedorchenko
- Date of birth: 13 April 1980 (age 46)
- Place of birth: Novocherkassk, Rostov Oblast, Soviet Union
- Height: 1.86 m (6 ft 1 in)
- Position: Defender

Senior career*
Years	Team	Apps	(Gls)
1997–2002	Stal Alchevsk	102	(1)
2003–2004	Neftekhimik Nizhnekamsk	61	(1)
2004	MTZ-RIPO Minsk	13	(1)
2005	Metallurg-Kuzbass Novokuznetsk	37	(2)
2006–2007	MTZ-RIPO Minsk	30	(0)
2007–2008	Komunalnyk Luhansk	3	(0)
2008	Qizilqum Zarafshon	14	(2)
2010	Naftan Novopolotsk	4	(0)
2011–2012	Tytan Armyansk	24	(1)
- * Club domestic league appearances and goals as of 9 May 2013

Artem Fedorchenko (Ukrainian: Артем Федорченко; born 13 April 1980) is a retired Ukrainian footballer.

== Career ==
Fedorchenko began playing football with FC Stal Alchevsk's youth side, and would eventually play twelve Ukrainian Premier League matches for the club during the 2000–01 season. He played for Russian First Division club FC Neftekhimik Nizhnekamsk during the 2003 and 2004 seasons, and had a brief spell with Belarusian Premier League side MTZ-RIPO Minsk before joining FC Metallurg-Kuzbass Novokuznetsk for the 2005 season.

Fedorchenko spent the following two seasons with MTZ-RIPO Minsk, but left the club after suffering a serious injury in June 2007.

He most recently played for Uzbek League club Qizilqum Zarafshon before joining Naftan Novopolotsk.
