= Suliko Kakabadze =

Georgian footballer

Personal information
- Date of birth: 18 May 1978 (age 48)
- Position: Forward

Senior career*
Years	Team	Apps	(Gls)
1999–2000	Merani-91 Tbilisi	11	(3)
2000	Dinamo Batumi	8	(0)
2001	Torpedo-MAZ Minsk	0	(0)
2001–2006	Naftan Novopolotsk	137	(35)
2007	Smorgon	10	(0)
2007	Interas Visaginas	7	(1)
- * Club domestic league appearances and goals

Suliko Kakabadze (Georgian: სულიკო კაკაბაძე; born 18 May 1978) is a retired Georgian football striker.
