= Dzmitry Vyarstak =

Belarusian footballer

Personal information
- Date of birth: 29 August 1980 (age 46)
- Place of birth: Grodno, Byelorussian SSR, Soviet Union
- Height: 1.85 m (6 ft 1 in)
- Position: Forward

Youth career
- 2001–2002: Neman Grodno

Senior career*
Years	Team	Apps	(Gls)
2001–2004	Neman Grodno	21	(1)
2003	→ Torpedo-SKA Minsk (loan)	3	(0)
2004	→ Smorgon (loan)	16	(16)
2005	Podlasie Biała Podlaska		
2005–2006	Smorgon	41	(28)
2007	Lokomotiv Minsk	22	(4)
2008	Dinamo-Belcard Grodno	9	(5)
2008–2009	Elana Toruń	28	(10)
2009–2010	Smorgon	25	(10)
2010	Neman Grodno	1	(0)
2011–2012	Belcard Grodno	43	(20)
- * Club domestic league appearances and goals as of 31 December 2012

Dzmitry Vyarstak (Belarusian: Дзмітрый Вярстак; Russian: Дмитрий Верстак; born 29 August 1980) is a retired Belarusian professional football player.
