= FC Vertikal Kalinkovichi =

FC Vertikal
- Full name: Football Club Vertikal
- Founded: 1996
- Ground: SDYSShOR-2 Stadium
- Capacity: 3,000
- Head Coach: Artem Galyak
- League: Belarusian Second League
- 2016: 7th

FC Vertikal Kalinkovichi is a Belarusian football club based in Kalinkovichi, Gomel Voblast.

== History ==
The club was founded in 1996. It spent the majority of its seasons playing in Belarusian Second League, with the exception of 2003 and 2004 (the team played in the First League) and two seasons in 2012 and 2013 (playing in Gomel Oblast regional league). Since 2014 the team rejoined Second League.

In 2021, Vertikal was revived rejoined Second League once again.

== Current squad ==
As of October 2023 Note: Flags indicate national team as defined under FIFA eligibility rules; some limited exceptions apply. Players may hold more than one non-FIFA nationality.

No.	Pos.	Nation	Player
—	GK	(Belarus) BLR	Maksim Kozhedub
—	GK	(Belarus) BLR	Aleksandr Levitskiy
—	GK	(Belarus) BLR	Stanislav Martinovich
—	GK	(Belarus) BLR	Ivan Mitsura
—	DF	(Belarus) BLR	Artem Bogatyrenko
—	DF	(Belarus) BLR	Vladislav Borisenko
—	DF	(Belarus) BLR	Yevgeniy Galota
—	DF	(Belarus) BLR	Andrey Zhur
—	DF	(Belarus) BLR	Maksim Pivovarov
—	DF	(Belarus) BLR	Maksim Patapaw
—	DF	(Belarus) BLR	Aleksey Tupik
—	DF	(Belarus) BLR	Dmitriy Tsuba
—	MF	(Belarus) BLR	Ivan Barysenka
—	MF	(Belarus) BLR	Artem Bulavko
—	MF	(Ukraine) UKR	Dmytro Vorobey
—	MF	(Belarus) BLR	Sergey Galushka
—	MF	(Belarus) BLR	Viktor Gvozd

No.	Pos.	Nation	Player
—	MF	(Belarus) BLR	Dmitriy Dulub
—	MF	(Belarus) BLR	Ivan Kulyashow
—	MF	(Belarus) BLR	Maksim Letyago
—	MF	(Belarus) BLR	Igor Machalnikov
—	MF	(Belarus) BLR	Ivan Prokopenko
—	MF	(Belarus) BLR	Aleksandr Rafalovich
—	MF	(Belarus) BLR	Sergey Tsuba
—	MF	(Belarus) BLR	Dmitriy Yurchenko
—	MF	(Belarus) BLR	Yuriy Yarkov
—	FW	(Belarus) BLR	Vladimir Bezhelev
—	FW	(Belarus) BLR	Mikhail Gonchar
—	FW	(Belarus) BLR	Aleksandr Kamysh
—	FW	(Belarus) BLR	Sergey Kachenya
—	FW	(Belarus) BLR	Dmitriy Sambuk
—	FW	(Belarus) BLR	Dmitriy Shatyrin
—	FW	(Belarus) BLR	Vlas Shulyak
