= Neman Stadium =

Sports complex in Grodno, Belarus

- Стадыён "Нёман"
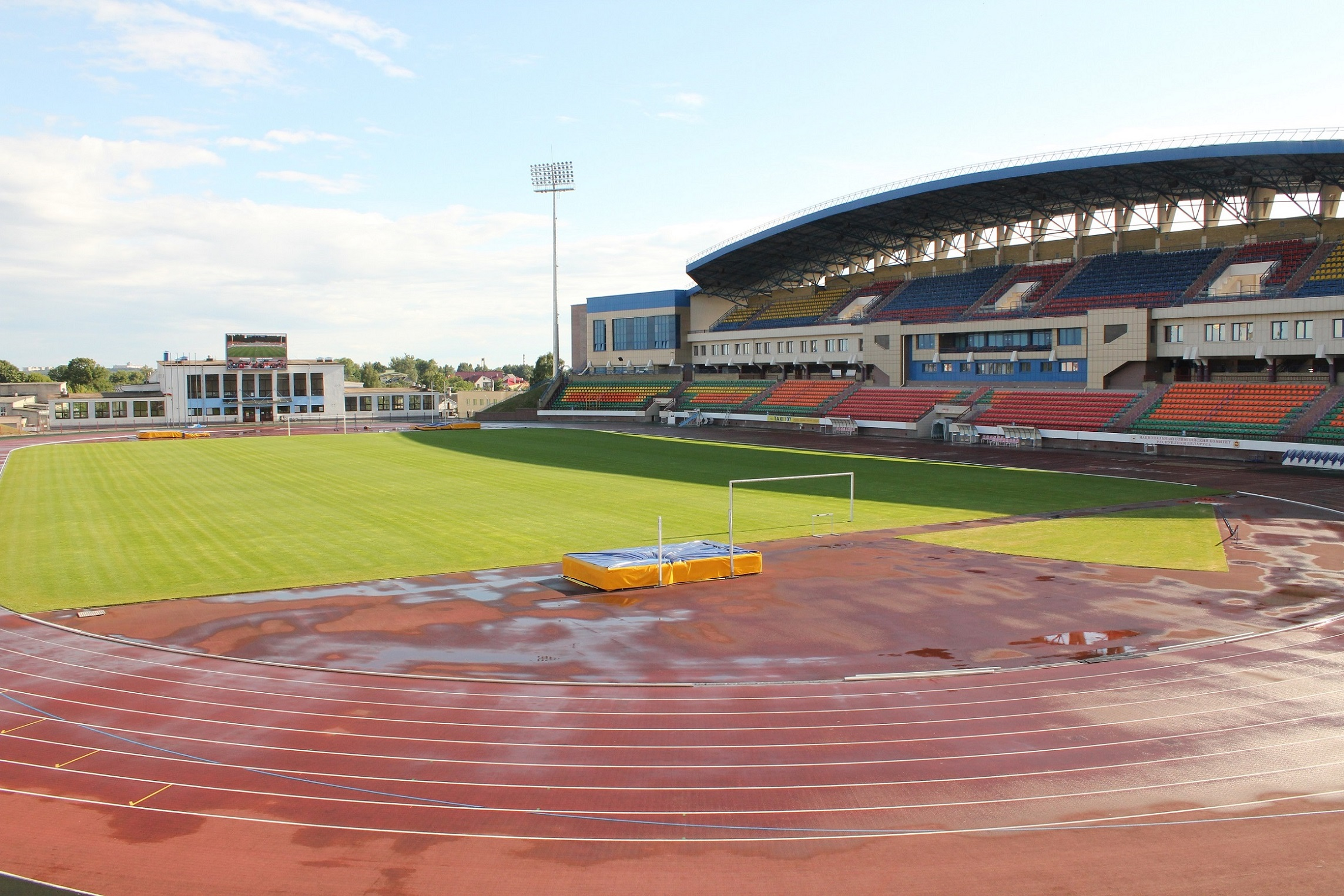
- Interactive map of Neman Stadium
- Former names: Krasnoye Znamya Stadium (1963–1993)
- Location: Grodno, Belarus
- Coordinates: 53.688861°N 23.82072°E
- Capacity: 8,500
- Surface: Grass
- Field size: 107 m × 70 m (351 ft × 230 ft)

Construction
- Built: 1963
- Renovated: 2002–2008

Tenant
- Neman Grodno

Neman Stadium (Belarusian: Стадыён "Нёман", Russian: Стадион "Неман") is a multi-purpose stadium in Grodno, Belarus. It is currently used mostly for football matches and is the home ground of Neman Grodno.

== History ==
The stadium was built in 1963 and was called Krasnoye Znamya Stadium. The name was changed in 1993. The original stadium capacity was 15,000. The stadium was modernized between 2002 and 2008, reducing its capacity to 8,500.

== International use ==
The stadium has been used by Neman Grodno in international matches. In February 2013, it was used as a home ground by BATE Borisov in a UEFA Europa League match against Turkish side Fenerbahçe, due to unavailability of other stadiums.

The stadium was the home ground for Belarus on one occasion, a 2010 FIFA World Cup qualification match against Andorra in June 2009 which Belarus won 5–1.
