= Atlant Stadium =

Football stadium in Novopolotsk, Belarus

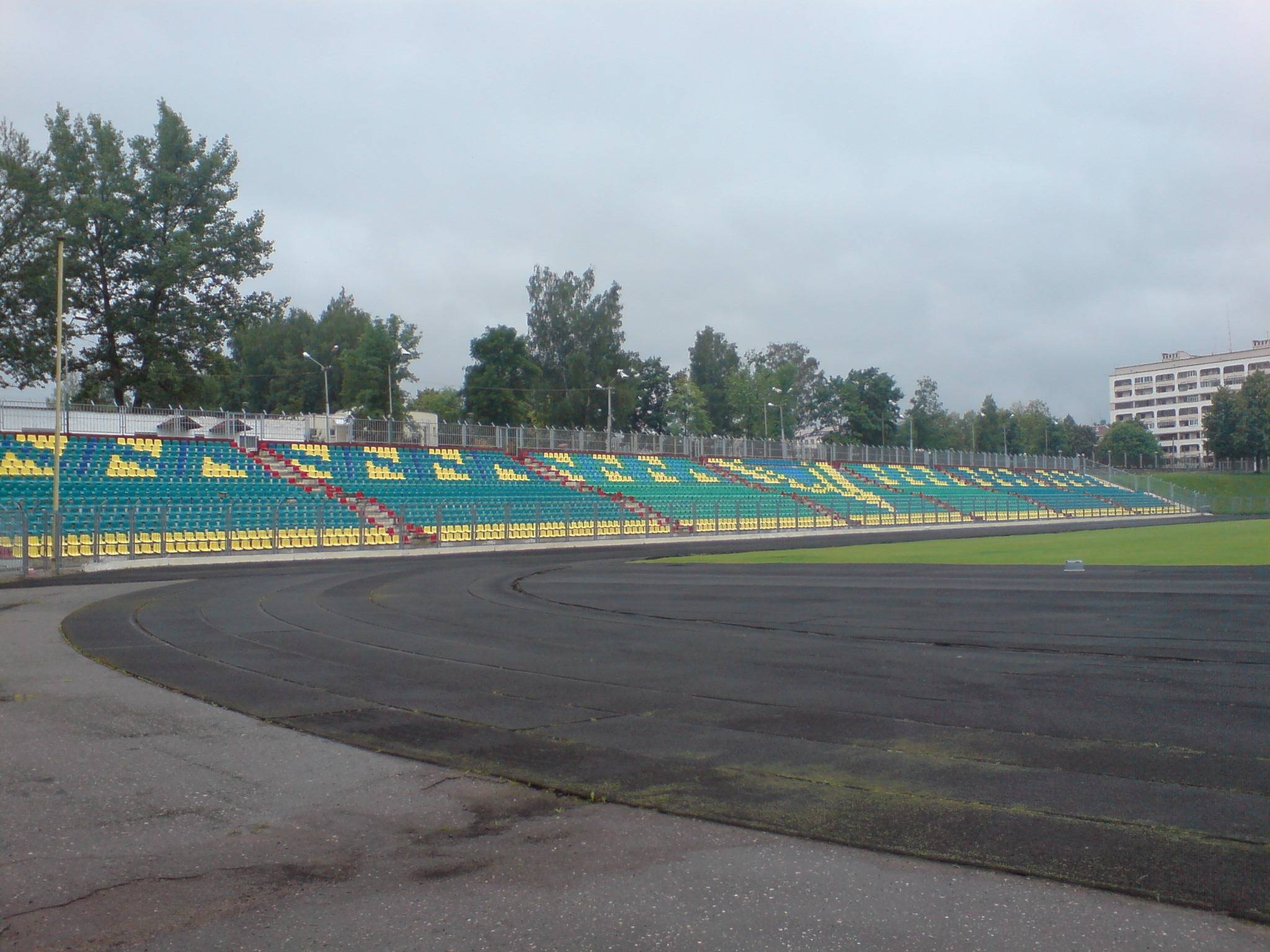
- The Atlant Stadium in July 2009
- Interactive map of Atlant Stadium
- Full name: Atlant Stadium
- Location: Novopolotsk, Belarus
- Coordinates: 55°32′14″N 28°38′54″E
- Capacity: 4,520
- Surface: Grass

Construction
- Opened: 1970
- Renovated: 2006

Tenant
- Naftan Novopolotsk

Atlant Stadium is a multi-purpose stadium in Novopolotsk, Belarus. It is currently used mostly for football matches and is the home ground of Naftan Novopolotsk. The stadium was built in 1970 and holds 4,520 people.
