= FC Darida Minsk Raion =

Darida Minsk Raion
- Full name: FC Darida Minsk Raion
- Founded: 2000
- Dissolved: 2008
- Ground: Darida Stadium; Kuntsaushchyna, Minsk
- Capacity: 6,000
- League: Belarusian Premier League
- 2008: 16th
Home colours	Away colours

FC Darida Minsk Raion (Belarusian: ФК Дарыда Мiнскі раён, romanized: FK Daryda Minski rayon) was a Belarusian football club. Their home stadium was Darida Stadium, located in Kuntsevschina district in Minsk. They disbanded in 2008.

== History ==
The team originally represented Minsk suburb Zhdanovichi, where their office was located. After promotion to the Premier League they changed official location to Minsk Raion, though their office and stadium locations remained the same.

Darida started playing in the Second League in 2000. In the first season, the team finished first and won the promotion to the First League. In 2002, Darida won the First League and since 2003, they started playing in the Belarusian Premier League. Their best result came in 2006 when the team finished 8th. In 2008, Darida finished last, 16th place and was supposed to be relegated, but due to financial troubles was disbanded.

== League and Cup history ==
Season	Level	Pos	Pld	W	D	L	Goals	Points	Domestic Cup	Notes
2000	3rd	1	22	16	1	5	42–23	49		Qualified for the final round
2000	3rd	1	14^{1}	9	2	3	31–14	29		Promoted
2001	2nd	3	28	19	4	5	49–22	61	Round of 32	
2002	2nd	1	30	23	5	2	89–23	74	Round of 32	Promoted
2003	1st	13	30	7	4	19	22–45	25	Round of 32	
2004	1st	11	30	9	8	13	38–48	35	Round of 16	
2005	1st	10	26	7	8	11	30–36	29	Semi-finals	
2006	1st	8	26	10	7	9	23–21	37	Round of 32	
2007	1st	11	26	7	4	15	27–46	25	Round of 16	
2008	1st	16	30	4	7	19	25–56	19	Quarter-finals	Relegated, disbanded
2009									Round of 32	

- ^{1} Including 6 games carried from the first round.
