= FC Gomel =

Gomel
- Full name: Football Club Gomel
- Founded: 1959; 67 years ago
- Ground: Central Stadium, Gomel, Belarus
- Capacity: 14,307
- Chairman: Vitaliy Kushner
- Manager: Andrey Harawtsow
- League: Belarusian Premier League
- 2025: Belarusian Premier League, 9th of 16
- Website: www.fcgomel.by
Home colours	Away colours

FC Gomel (Belarusian: ФК Гомель; ФК Ґомель, romanized: FK Homiel) is a Belarusian professional football club based in the city of Gomel. Their home stadium is Central Stadium.

== History ==
Teams from Gomel (usually city or raion selection or railway-based team Lokomotiv, but not always) played in the Belarusian SSR championships since the early 1920s. In 1946, Byelorussian SSR league for one season becomes one of the zones of the USSR 3rd level league, and Lokomotiv Gomel became the first city team to play in the Soviet league.

The modern Gomel team was founded in 1959 as Lokomotiv Gomel. They played at the 2nd level of Soviet football between 1959 and 1968. The results varied between seasons, as the team managed to finish 1st in their zone in 1962 as well as last in 1959 and 1963. However, because Soviet league system structure was changing almost every season in the 1950s and 1960s, Lokomotiv was not promoted or relegated until another league reorganisation in 1969.

Gomselmash played at the 3rd level of Soviet football between 1969 and 1989, until further league reorganisation in 1990, after which the team was relegated to the 4th level.

In 1992, Gomselmash joined the newly formed Belarusian Premier League. The first years were unsuccessful and the team relegated in 1995. They changed name to the current one, FC Gomel, the same year. In 1998, Gomel returned to Premier League and achieved much better results than before (champions title in 2003, 2nd place in 2007 and 3rd in 1999). The team also won the Belarusian Cup in 2002 and made it to the final in 2004.

In 2012, they played English club Liverpool in the UEFA Europa League qualifying rounds. In the first leg they lost 0–1 and lost again away at Anfield in the second leg 3–0.

=== Name changes ===
- 1959: Lokomotiv Gomel
- 1965: Spartak Gomel
- 1969: Gomselmash Gomel
- 1976: Mashinostroitel Gomel
- 1978: Gomselmash Gomel
- 1995: Gomel

== Current squad ==
As of 21 November, 2026

Note: Flags indicate national team as defined under FIFA eligibility rules; some limited exceptions apply. Players may hold more than one non-FIFA nationality.

No.	Pos.	Nation	Player
4	DF	BLR	Aleksey Gavrilovich (on loan from Dinamo Minsk)
5	MF	BLR	Gleb Protasenya
7	MF	NGR	Raymond Adeola
8	MF	BLR	Yawhen Barsukow
9	MF	BLR	Kirill Leonovich
10	FW	BLR	Denis Laptev
11	FW	BLR	Timofey Simanenka
13	FW	BLR	Maksim Mardas (on loan from BATE Borisov)
14	DF	BLR	Pavel Pashevich
16	DF	BLR	Igor Zayats
17	MF	BLR	Vadim Martinkevich
19	MF	BLR	Daniil Silinsky
21	MF	BLR	Denis Kovalevich
22	FW	BLR	Dmitry Yemelyanov

No.	Pos.	Nation	Player
23	FW	RUS	Kirill Danilin
27	MF	BLR	Maksim Drazdow
30	DF	BLR	Yegor Troyakov
33	MF	BLR	Viktar Sotnikaw
43	DF	RUS	Damir Shaykhtdinov
44	GK	BLR	Stanislav Kleschuk
49	GK	BLR	Artyom Karatay (on loan from Dinamo Minsk)
51	MF	BLR	Anton Semenyow
52	MF	BLR	Nikita Mayorow
66	MF	BLR	Pavel Sergutko
77	MF	RUS	Vladislav Lazarev
88	GK	BLR	Aleksandr Ryzhchenko
90	DF	BLR	Georgiy Kukushkin

=== Out on loan ===
Note: Flags indicate national team as defined under FIFA eligibility rules; some limited exceptions apply. Players may hold more than one non-FIFA nationality.

No.	Pos.	Nation	Player
—	FW	BLR	Arseniy Achapovskiy (at Belshina until 31 December 2026)
—	MF	BLR	Alexandr Savitskiy (at Naftan Novopolotsk until 31 December 2026)

== League and cup history ==
Soviet Union

Season	Level	Pos	Pld	W	D	L	Goals	Points	Domestic Cup	Notes
1959	2nd	15^{1}	28	0	7	21	17–61	7		
1960	2nd	9	30	11	8	11	36–38	40	Round of 128	
1961	2nd	3	30	14	8	8	37–24	36	Round of 256	
1962	2nd	1	32	18	10	4	43–19	46	Round of 32	
1962	2nd	2	2	0	1	1	0–1	1	Round of 32	Promotion/relegation play-off^{2}
1963	2nd	18^{3}	34	4	12	18	13–46	20	Round of 32	
1964	2nd	25	38	6	15	17	19–37	27		
1965	2nd	24	46	13	17	16	34–43	43	Round of 64	
1966	2nd	15	32	7	12	13	16–29	26	Round of 128	
1967	2nd	7	38	11	19	8	27–24	41	Round of 64	
1968	2nd	21	40	6	12	22	21–50	24	Round of 256	
1968	2nd	2	2	0	1	1	0–2	1	Round of 256	Promotion/relegation play-off^{4}
1969	3rd	2	32	16	9	7	44–18	41		
1969	3rd	1	2	0	2	0	3–3	2		Promotion/relegation play-off^{5}
1970	3rd	22^{6}	42	7	10	25	22–55	24	Round of 256	
1971	3rd	6	38	16	13	9	47–28	61		
1972	3rd	10	38	15	9	14	39–45	54		
1973	3rd	12	32	7	9	16	32–49	19^{7}		
1974	3rd	11	40	13	13	14	53–57	39		
1975	3rd	13	34	9	10	15	28–47	28		
1976	3rd	11	38	14	9	15	37–41	37		
1977	3rd	16	40	12	8	20	32–49	32		
1978	3rd	14	46	16	9	21	56–60	41		
1979	3rd	21	46	7	14	25	34–71	28		
1980	3rd	6	32	12	8	12	31–33	32		
1981	3rd	8	40	13	7	20	50–58	33		
1982	3rd	7	30	13	8	9	33–27	34		
1983	3rd	8	32	12	8	12	40–39	32		
1984	3rd	5	34	18	7	9	44–30	43		
1985	3rd	15	30	7	6	17	24–41	20		
1986	3rd	8	30	11	9	10	36–39	31		
1987	3rd	14	34	8	11	15	29–47	27		
1988	3rd	14	34	9	8	17	26–44	26		
1989	3rd	14	42	17	7	18	39–46	41		Relegated^{8}
1990	4th	7	32	14	4	14	48–48	32		
1991	4th	16	42	13	5	24	40–54	31		

- ^{1} Finished last in its zone, but saved from relegation due to 2nd level (Class B) expansion from 7 to 9 territorial zones (from 101 to 142 teams) in 1960.
- ^{2} No promotion to the Top League in 1962 was awarded due to Top League (Class A) reduction from 22 to 20 teams in 1963. Lokomotiv's play-off performance didn't affect its next season league allocation. Winning their zone allowed them to stay on the second level (Class B), which was reduced from 10 zones (150 teams) in 1962 to a single group of 18 teams in 1963.
- ^{3} Finished last, but saved from relegation due to 2nd level (Class A Second Group) expansion from 18 to 27 teams in 1964.
- ^{4} Play-off with the best-placed Belarusian team from the 3rd level (Class B) in 1968 for the right to play on the 2nd level (Class A Second Group) in 1969.
- ^{5} Play-off with the lowest-placed Belarusian team from the 2nd level (Class A Second Group) in 1969 for the right to play in Class A Second Group (which becomes the 3rd level league next year due to introduction of Class A Top Group as the Top level) in 1970.
- ^{6} Finished last in its zone, but saved from relegation due to 3rd level (Class A Second Group, renamed to Second League since next season) expansion from 3 to 6 territorial zones (from 66 to 124 teams) in 1971.
- ^{7} In 1973, every draw was followed by a penalty shoot-out, with a winner gaining 1 point and loser gaining 0.
- ^{8} Though finished 14th from the 22 teams in 1989, Gomselmash relegated as the Second League (3rd level) was reduced from 9 zones (195 teams) to 3 zones (66 teams) and the Second Lower League with 9 zones was introduced as a 4th level.

Belarus

Season	Level	Pos	Pld	W	D	L	Goals	Points	Domestic Cup	Notes
1992	1st	16	15	1	3	11	5–32	5	Round of 16	
1992–93	1st	10	32	9	8	15	23–40	26	Round of 16	
1993–94	1st	15	30	7	5	18	36–47	19	Round of 16	
1994–95	1st	15	30	6	6	18	26–59	18	Round of 32	Relegated
1995	2nd	9	14	5	2	7	19–17	12	Quarter-finals	
1996	2nd	4	24	11	9	4	42–19	42	Quarter-finals	
1997	2nd	1	30	27	1	2	83–9	82	Round of 32	Promoted
1998	1st	5	28	12	9	7	36–30	45	Round of 32	
1999	1st	3	30	19	6	5	57–28	63	Quarter-finals	
2000	1st	6	30	17	2	11	50–41	53	Semi-finals	
2001	1st	6	26	13	5	8	36–24	44	Quarter-finals	
2002	1st	6	26	13	4	9	46–33	43	Winners	
2003	1st	1	30	23	5	2	56–12	74	Semi-finals	
2004	1st	5	30	13	7	10	42–41	46	Runners-up	
2005	1st	7	26	12	3	11	34–32	39	Quarter-finals	
2006	1st	5	26	12	6	8	33–32	42	Semi-finals	
2007	1st	2	26	12	8	6	49–28	44	Round of 16	
2008	1st	11	30	9	6	15	35–47	33	Quarter-finals	
2009	1st	12	26	8	5	13	31–48	29	Quarter-finals	Relegated
2010	2nd	1	30	27	1	2	80–16	82	Round of 16	Promoted
2011	1st	3	33	13	15	5	36–24	54	Winners	
2012	1st	4	30	14	8	8	39–24	50	Semi-finals	
2013	1st	6	32	11	7	14	34–40	40	Quarter-finals	
2014	1st	6	32	10	8	14	29–41	38	Quarter-finals	
2015	1st	14	26	5	3	18	22–41	18	Round of 16	Relegated
2016	2nd	1	26	19	6	1	48–11	63	Round of 16	Promoted
2017	1st	10	30	9	8	13	24–25	35	Round of 32	
2018	1st								Round of 16	

== European history ==
As of match played 27 July 2022

Competition	GP	W	D	L	GF	GA	±
UEFA Champions League	2	1	0	1	1	2	–1
UEFA Europa League / UEFA Cup	16	5	1	10	21	25	–4
UEFA Europa Conference League	2	0	0	2	2	7	-5
UEFA Intertoto Cup	4	1	1	2	3	7	-4
Total	24	7	2	15	27	41	−14

Season	Competition	Round	Club	Home	Away	Aggregate
1999	UEFA Intertoto Cup	R1	(Czech Republic) Hradec Králové	1–0	0–1	1–1 (3–1 p)
1999	UEFA Intertoto Cup	R2	(Sweden) Hammarby	2–2	0–4	2–6
2000–01	UEFA Cup	QR	(Sweden) AIK	0–2	0–1	0–3
2002–03	UEFA Cup	QR	(Finland) HJK	1–0	4–0	5–0
2002–03	UEFA Cup	R1	(Germany) Schalke 04	1–4	0–4	1–8
2004–05	UEFA Champions League	1Q	(Albania) Tirana	0–2	1–0	1–2
2008–09	UEFA Cup	1QR	(Poland) Legia Warsaw	1–4	0–0	1–4
2011–12	UEFA Europa League	3QR	(Turkey) Bursaspor	1–3	1–2	2–5
2012–13	UEFA Europa League	1QR	(Faroe Islands) Víkingur Gøta	4–0	6–0	10–0
2012–13	UEFA Europa League	2QR	(North Macedonia) Renova	0–1	2–0	2–1
2012–13	UEFA Europa League	3QR	(England) Liverpool	0–1	0–3	0–4
2022–23	UEFA Europa Conference League	2QR	(Greece) Aris Thessaloniki	1–2	1–5	2–7

== Managers ==
- Pavel Baranov (1959)
- Gleb Rabikov (1960–61)
- Vadim Radzievski (1962 – July 63)
- (Soviet Union) Sergei Korshunov (July 1963)
- Vasiliy Yermilov (1964–65)
- Alexander Sagreski (1966)
- Vladimir Eremeev (1967–68)
- Viktor Korotkevich (1969–70)
- (Soviet Union) Leonard Adamov (1971–72)
- Leonid Yerochovich (July 1973)
- Yevgeniy Glemboski (July 1973–74)
- Viktor Korotkevich (1975 – July 1977)
- Alexander Tschirimisin (July 1977–80)
- Kasimir Symanski (1981–83)
- (Soviet Union) Nikolay Kiselyov (1984)
- Viktor Korotkevich (1985 – July 1987)
- (Byelorussian Soviet Socialist Republic) Valery Janotschkin (July 1, 1987 – December 31, 1987)
- Yuriy Golovey (July 1988)
- Alexander Pryazhnikov (July 1988–90)
- Kasimir Symanski (1991)
- Vladimir Astratenko (1992–93)
- Viktor Korotkevich (1993–94)
- (Belarus) Nikolai Gorjunov (1994–96)
- Yuriy Grunov (1997)
- (Belarus) Valery Janotschkin (January 1, 1998 – May 15, 1999)
- (Belarus) Vyacheslav Akshayev (January 1, 1999 – June 30, 2000)
- (Belarus) Aleksandr Kuznetsov (August 2000 – May 1)
- (Belarus) Valery Janotschkin (May 15, 2001 – September 1, 2001)
- (Russia) Sergei Podpaly (August 1, 2001 – June 26, 2004)
- (Russia) Aleksandr Kuznetsov (July 1, 2004 – August 12, 2005)
- (Belarus) Nikolai Gorjunov (Aug 15, 2005 – July 1, 2006)
- (Russia) Viktor Papayev (July 5, 2006 – October 27, 2006)
- (Belarus) Vladimir Golmak (interim) (October 28, 2006 – January 8, 2007)
- (Belarus) Anatoliy Yurevich (January 9, 2007 – August 5, 2008)
- (Belarus) Andrey Yusipets (August 15, 2008 – August 30, 2009)
- (Belarus) Leonid Borsuk (interim) (September 1, 2009 – December 13, 2009)
- (Belarus) Oleg Kubarev (December 14, 2009 – December 9, 2012)
- (Belarus) Alyaksey Merkulaw (December 10, 2012 – 2019)

== Honours ==
- Belarusian Premier League
  - Winners (1): 2003
  - Runners-up (1): 2007
  - 3rd place (2): 1999, 2011
- Belarusian Cup
  - Winners (3): 2002, 2011, 2022
  - Runners-up (1): 2004
- Belarusian Super Cup
  - Winners (1): 2012
  - Runners-up (1): 2023
