= 2009–10 Belarusian Cup =

Tournament details
- Country: Belarus
- Teams: 48

Final positions
- Champions: BATE Borisov (2nd title)
- Runners-up: Torpedo Zhodino

Tournament statistics
- Matches played: 61
- Goals scored: 217 (3.56 per match)
- Top goal scorer(s): Sergey Zabolotsky (6 goals)

The 2009–10 Belarusian Cup was the 19th season of the Belarusian annual cup competition. Contrary to the league season, it was conducted in a fall-spring rhythm. The first games were played on 12 July 2009. BATE Borisov won the Cup and qualified for the UEFA Europa League second qualifying round.

== First round ==
Into this round entered 32 teams from the Belarusian First League (second level) and lower. These matches were held on 12 and 15 July 2009.

12 July 2009	Zvezda-BGU Minsk (III)	2–1	SKVICH Minsk (II)	Minsk
16:00 UTC+3	Shkuratenko 18'; Safrankov 25'	Report	Tsyganenko 8'	Stadium: RCOP-BGU Stadium; Attendance: 150; Referee: Dmitry Digilevich (Zhodino)

12 July 2009	Molodechno (III)	3–1	Khimik Svetlogorsk (II)	Chist
16:00 UTC+3	Sahakyan 60' (o.g.); Korsak 78', 87' (pen.)	Report	Malinovsky 41'	Stadium: School Stadium; Attendance: 300; Referee: Sergey Tsinkevich (Osipovichi)

12 July 2009	Zhlobin (III)	2–0	Vertikal Kalinkovichi (III)	Rogachev
16:00 UTC+3	Yafremaw 65'; Verkhov 85'	Report		Stadium: DYuSSh-1 Stadium; Attendance: 100; Referee: Pavel Rudenkov (Gomel)

12 July 2009	Orsha (III)	1–1 (a.e.t.) (1–4 p)	Slavia Mozyr (II)	Balbasovo
16:00 UTC+3	Kitayev 7'	Report	Fedorenko 45'	Stadium: City Stadium; Attendance: 1,200; Referee: Andrey Divakov (Mogilev)
	Penalties
	Penalty missed Penalty scored		(penalty scored) Hushchanka; (penalty scored) Novak; (penalty scored) Fedorenko; (penalty scored) Trofimenko

12 July 2009	Livadiya Dzerzhinsk (III)	2–5 (a.e.t.)	Gorodeya (III)	Dzerzhinsk
16:00 UTC+3	Sugako 56' (pen.); Yuraga 89'	Report	Shupilov 71'; Sorochinskiy 90'; Kuzmenok 93'; Trepachkin 118'; Kondrashuk 120'	Stadium: City Stadium; Attendance: 250; Referee: Renat Shkvarchenko (Stolbtsy)

12 July 2009	Torpedo-MAZ Minsk (A)	0–1	Rudensk (III)	Minsk
16:00 UTC+3		Report	Khodnevich 49'	Stadium: KFP Minsk; Attendance: 150

12 July 2009	Klechesk Kletsk (III)	0–2	Belshina Bobruisk (II)	Kletsk
17:00 UTC+3		Report	Usaw 36', 62'	Stadium: City Stadium; Attendance: 500; Referee: Antuan Mayorov (Minsk)

12 July 2009	Slutsksakhar Slutsk (III)	5–2	Osipovichi (III)	Slutsk
17:00 UTC+3	Rapeika 55'; Kostyukevich 58'; Leschenko 72'; Karpilenko 87'; Lis 90'	Report	Prakapenka 79'; Pirozhnik 89'	Stadium: City Stadium; Attendance: 1,000; Referee: Nikita Pyreyev (Minsk)

12 July 2009	Bereza (III)	1–2	Kommunalnik Slonim (II)	Bereza
17:00 UTC+3	Danilyuk 90+2'	Report	Kutsko 54'; Narkovich 74' (pen.)	Stadium: DYuSSh-1 Stadium; Attendance: 500; Referee: Valery Vyalichka (Minsk)

12 July 2009	Miory (A)	0–4	Polotsk (II)	Miory
17:00 UTC+3		Report	Savinaw 47', 86'; Sikora 57'; Khorbin 73'	Stadium: City Stadium; Attendance: 500; Referee: Oleg Murashkevich (Novopolotsk)

12 July 2009	Neftianik Rechitsa (A)	1–11	Vedrich-97 Rechitsa (II)	Rechytsa
17:00 UTC+3	Pyrkh 27' (pen.)	Report	Grishchenko 5'; Kotsur 18'; Klop 23', 36', 47'; Shepelew 25'; Zyanko 29'; Yudenkov 80'; Tretyak 81'; Khodyko 86'; Stolyarenko 90+2'	Stadium: Central Stadium; Attendance: 500; Referee: Oleg Cherepnev (Minsk)

12 July 2009	Neman Mosty (III)	2–1	Lida (II)	Mosty
18:00 UTC+3	Kardash 13'; Domas 30'	Report	Safronaw 25'	Stadium: Neman Stadium; Attendance: 500; Referee: Yuriy Kuntsevich (Grodno)

12 July 2009	Miasokombinat Vitebsk (III)	1–6	Spartak Shklov (II)	Vitebsk
18:00 UTC+3	Pakulin 7'	Report	Urupin 8', 43', 67'; Prudilko 68'; Chernykh 84' (pen.); Glushankov 90+1'	Stadium: Vitebsky CSK; Attendance: 50; Referee: Dmitry Yevnevich (Minsk)

12 July 2009	Khimik Grodno (A)	0–4	Belcard Grodno (II)	Grodno
18:00 UTC+3		Report	Traskevich 8', 42'; Leshanyuk 49', 65'	Stadium: GRGU Stadium; Attendance: 350; Referee: Yury Fomin (Volkovysk)

12 July 2009	MGUP Mogilev (A)	0–2	DSK Gomel (II)	Mogilev
19:00 UTC+3		Report	Zabolotsky 39'; Udodov 75'	Stadium: SDYuSShOR-7 Stadium; Attendance: 100; Referee: Gennadiy Yarets (Minsk)

15 July 2009	Kobrin (A)	1–7	Baranovichi (II)	Malorita
18:30 UTC+3	Brishtel 68' (pen.)	Report	Kazeka 2'; Kolyadko 8' (pen.); Drozd 20', 25'; Luzhankov 51', 90', 90+1'	Stadium: City Stadium; Attendance: 500; Referee: Nikolay Kurilovich (Bereza)

== Round of 32 ==
Into this round entered the 16 winners from the First Round, two First Division clubs and the 14 clubs from the Belarusian Premier League. The winners from the First Round were drawn against those clubs that received a bye to this round. These matches took place on 7, 8 and 9 August 2009.

7 August 2009	Molodechno (III)	2–3	Neman Grodno	Molodechno
18:00 UTC+3	Makritsky 9'; Vyshinsky 64' (pen.)	Report	Semyonov 4'; Horbach 16'; Kavalyonak 85'	Stadium: City Stadium; Attendance: 1,300; Referee: Ivan Safaryan (Minsk)

8 August 2009	Spartak Shklov (II)	1–2 (a.e.t.)	Veras Nesvizh (II)	Shklov
16:00 UTC+3	Prudilko 49'	Report	Tikhonchik 87', 97'	Stadium: Spartak Stadium; Attendance: 150; Referee: Vladimir Ischenko (Rechytsa)

8 August 2009	Kommunalnik Slonim (II)	0–2	Gomel	Slonim
17:00 UTC+3		Report	Dashuk 18'; Maycon 41'	Stadium: Yunost Stadium; Attendance: 700; Referee: Vasily Smirnykh (Minsk)

8 August 2009	Slavia Mozyr (II)	2–0	Volna Pinsk (II)	Mozyr
17:00 UTC+3	Arhiptsaw 33'; Volkov 71'	Report		Stadium: Yunost Stadium; Attendance: 1,000; Referee: Gennadiy Yarets (Minsk)

8 August 2009	Belshina Bobruisk (II)	1–0	Dinamo Brest	Bobruisk
17:00 UTC+3	Usaw 7'	Report		Stadium: Spartak Stadium; Attendance: 2,100; Referee: Igor Kruk (Molodechno)

8 August 2009	Zvezda-BGU Minsk (III)	1–7	Dinamo Minsk	Minsk
17:00 UTC+3	Babakov 36'	Report	Mbanangoyé 10'; Rekish 30', 53'; Strakhanovich 63'; Hawrushka 90'; Putsila 90+1'; Ivanow 90+3'	Stadium: Dinamo-Yuni Stadium; Attendance: 1,500; Referee: Nikita Pyreyev (Minsk)

8 August 2009	Gorodeya (III)	1–2 (a.e.t.)	Dnepr Mogilev	Gorodeya
17:00 UTC+3	Kondrashuk 66'	Report	Matsveenka 8'; Tereshchenko 95'	Stadium: Gorodeya Stadium; Attendance: 500; Referee: Pavel Rudenkov (Gomel)

8 August 2009	Polotsk (II)	3–3 (a.e.t.) (3–2 p)	Vitebsk	Polotsk
17:00 UTC+3	Khorbin 43'; Aleshchanka 81', 113'	Report	Shakaw 8'; Gospodars 35', 95'	Stadium: Spartak Stadium; Attendance: 500; Referee: Dmitry Yevnevich (Minsk)
	Penalties
	Yanchenko (penalty scored); Zhdanok (penalty missed); Dementyev (penalty scored); Aleshchanka (penalty scored); Krasko (penalty missed)		(penalty scored) Kobets; (penalty missed) Maisuradze; (penalty scored) Dzivakow; (penalty missed) Kosak; (penalty missed) Harawtsow

8 August 2009	Zhlobin (III)	0–2	Naftan Novopolotsk	Rogachev
17:00 UTC+3		Report	Verkhovtsov 35'; Rudzik 83'	Stadium: DYuSSh-1 Stadium; Attendance: 500; Referee: Denis Scherbakov (Minsk)

8 August 2009	Slutsksakhar Slutsk (III)	1–2	MTZ-RIPO Minsk	Slutsk
17:00 UTC+3	Lis 6'	Report	Ceolin 15'; Kharitonchik 90+1'	Stadium: City Stadium; Attendance: 2,500; Referee: Yury Fomin (Volkovysk)

8 August 2009	Vedrich-97 Rechitsa (II)	2–5	Granit Mikashevichi	Rechytsa
18:00 UTC+3	Bondarenko 41'; Karatai 69'	Report	Sashcheka 4', 13'; Kuznyatsow 10'; Yanush 48'; Hancharyk 86'	Stadium: Central Stadium; Attendance: 500; Referee: Antuan Mayorov (Minsk)

8 August 2009	Rudensk (III)	1–3	Minsk	Maryina Horka
18:00 UTC+3	Khodnevich 61'	Report	Rybak 14'; Asipenka 20' (pen.), 25'	Stadium: City Stadium; Attendance: 650; Referee: Vyacheslav Kolochinsky (Mogilev)

8 August 2009	DSK Gomel (II)	2–0	Smorgon	Gomel
18:00 UTC+3	Borisik 11'; Zabolotsky 39'	Report		Stadium: Central Stadium; Attendance: 1,500; Referee: Andrey Soroka (Smolevichi)

8 August 2009	Belcard Grodno (II)	0–1	Torpedo Zhodino	Grodno
18:00 UTC+3		Report	Voronkov 90+5'	Stadium: Neman Stadium; Attendance: 2,000; Referee: Sergey Tsinkevich (Osipovichi)

8 August 2009	Baranovichi (II)	0–4	BATE Borisov	Baranovichi
18:00 UTC+3		Report	Alumona 38', 80'; Rodionov 45+4', 90+1'	Stadium: Lokomotiv Stadium; Attendance: 4,200; Referee: Yuriy Kuntsevich (Grodno)

9 August 2009	Neman Mosty (III)	0–5	Shakhtyor Soligorsk	Mosty
18:00 UTC+3		Report	Kavalchuk 5' (pen.); Nikifarenka 42'; Lyavonchyk 65'; Byahanski 68', 89'	Stadium: Neman Stadium; Attendance: 1,100; Referee: Nikolay Kurilovich (Bereza)

== Round of 16 ==
The matches were played between October and November 2009.

Team 1	Agg.	Team 2	1st leg	2nd leg
Dnepr Mogilev	2–7	Dinamo Minsk	2–4	0–3
Naftan Novopolotsk	7–1	Slavia Mozyr (II)	4–0	3–1
Belshina Bobruisk (II)	2–3	Shakhtyor Soligorsk	0–1	2–2
Torpedo Zhodino	8–0	Veras Nesvizh (II)	5–0	3–0
Granit Mikashevichi	0–2	Neman Grodno	0–1	0–1
Gomel	3–4	DSK Gomel (II)	1–1	2–3
MTZ-RIPO Minsk	5–3	Polotsk (II)	5–2	0–1
BATE Borisov	3–0	Minsk	1–0	2–0

=== First leg ===
28 October 2009	Dnepr Mogilev	2–4	Dinamo Minsk	Mogilev
18:00 UTC+3	Sazankow 26'; Bychanok 54'	Report	Shkabara 16', 67'; Putsila 45'; Kislyak 53'	Stadium: Spartak Stadium; Attendance: 1,700; Referee: Yuriy Kuntsevich (Grodno)

4 November 2009	Naftan Novopolotsk	4–0	Slavia Mozyr (II)	Novopolotsk
14:00 UTC+3	Zyulew 26'; Strypeykis 43'; Tarashchyk 45+1'; Zhukowski 59'	Report		Stadium: Atlant Stadium; Attendance: 200; Referee: Oleg Cherepnev (Bobruisk)

11 November 2009	Belshina Bobruisk (II)	0–1	Shakhtyor Soligorsk	Bobruisk
13:00 UTC+3		Report	Ryndzyuk 22'	Stadium: Spartak Stadium; Attendance: 1,200; Referee: Aleksei Kulbakov (Gomel)

11 November 2009	Torpedo Zhodino	5–0	Veras Nesvizh (II)	Zhodino
14:00 UTC+3	Boyka 8', 22', 64'; Urupin 60'; Yawseenka 89' (pen.)	Report		Stadium: Torpedo Stadium; Attendance: 900; Referee: Dmitry Yevnevich (Minsk)

11 November 2009	Granit Mikashevichi	0–1	Neman Grodno	Luninets
14:00 UTC+3		Report	Suchkow 9'	Stadium: Polesye Stadium; Attendance: 300; Referee: Nikita Pyreyev (Minsk)

11 November 2009	Gomel	1–1	DSK Gomel (II)	Gomel
18:00 UTC+3	Shahoyka 76'	Report	Marozaw 45'	Stadium: Central Stadium; Attendance: 1,500; Referee: Yury Fomin (Volkovysk)

15 November 2009	MTZ-RIPO Minsk	5–2	Polotsk (II)	Minsk
13:30 UTC+3	Kvaratskhelia 17'; Maewski 20'; Ceolin 39'; Kendysh 75'; Lukša 86'	Report	Aleshchanka 25', 43'	Stadium: Traktor Stadium; Attendance: 400; Referee: Yuriy Kuntsevich (Grodno)

22 November 2009	BATE Borisov	1–0	Minsk	Borisov
14:00 UTC+3	Nyakhaychyk 45'	Report		Stadium: City Stadium; Attendance: 3,900; Referee: Sergey Sakharevich (Grodno)

=== Second leg ===
4 November 2009	Dinamo Minsk	3–0 (7–2 agg.)	Dnepr Mogilev	Minsk
14:00 UTC+3	Kislyak 58'; Drahun 78'; Hawrushka 89'	Report		Stadium: Dinamo-Yuni Stadium; Attendance: 600; Referee: Andrey Soroka (Smolevichi)

11 November 2009	Slavia Mozyr (II)	1–3 (1–7 agg.)	Naftan Novopolotsk	Mozyr
13:30 UTC+3	Petrov 66'	Report	Strypeykis 3'; Zuew 15'; Zyulew 81'	Stadium: Yunost Stadium; Attendance: 300; Referee: Anatoly Sednev (Mogilev)

15 November 2009	DSK Gomel (II)	3–2 (4–3 agg.)	Gomel	Gomel
13:00 UTC+3	Zabolotsky 28'; Udodov 35'; Khomchenko 87'	Report	Bressan 18'; Tsimashenka 36'	Stadium: Central Stadium; Attendance: 1,500; Referee: Georgiy Verbitsky (Slonim)

15 November 2009	Veras Nesvizh (II)	0–3 (0–8 agg.)	Torpedo Zhodino	Gorodeya
13:00 UTC+3		Report	Brusnikin 11'; Aleksiyevich 22'; Boyka 47'	Stadium: Gorodeya Stadium; Attendance: 200; Referee: Valery Vyalichka (Minsk)

15 November 2009	Neman Grodno	1–0 (2–0 agg.)	Granit Mikashevichi	Grodno
13:00 UTC+3	Kavalyonak 46'	Report		Stadium: Neman Stadium; Attendance: 1,500; Referee: Sergey Tsinkevich (Osipovichi)

15 November 2009	Shakhtyor Soligorsk	2–2 (3–2 agg.)	Belshina Bobruisk (II)	Soligorsk
13:00 UTC+3	Ryndzyuk 2', 81'	Report	Karolik 44', 61'	Stadium: Stroitel Stadium; Attendance: 700; Referee: Andrey Zhukov (Minsk)

18 November 2009	Polotsk (II)	1–0 (3–5 agg.)	MTZ-RIPO Minsk	Novopolotsk
13:00 UTC+3	Zhukaw 44'	Report		Stadium: Atlant Stadium; Attendance: 400; Referee: Andrey Soroka (Smolevichi)

27 November 2009	Minsk	0–2 (0–3 agg.)	BATE Borisov	Minsk
18:00 UTC+3		Report	Nyakhaychyk 30'; Alumona 33'	Stadium: KFP Minsk; Attendance: 1,200; Referee: Vitaly Sevostyanik (Grodno)

== Quarterfinals ==
The first leg games were held on 13 and 14 March 2010 and the second leg games were held on 17 and 18 March 2010. Most of the games were played in Minsk on artificial grounds due to bad grass pitch conditions in March.

Team 1	Agg.	Team 2	1st leg	2nd leg
Naftan Novopolotsk	1–5	Torpedo Zhodino	0–2	1–3
Neman Grodno	1–4	Shakhtyor Soligorsk	1–2	0–2
BATE Borisov	7–1	MTZ-RIPO Minsk	7–0	0–1
DSK Gomel (II)	(a) 3–3	Dinamo Minsk	0–2	3–1

=== First leg ===
13 March 2010	Naftan Novopolotsk	0–2	Torpedo Zhodino	Mogilev
15:00 UTC+3		Report	Chelyadzinski 42' (o.g.); Kryvobok 89'	Stadium: SDYuSShOR-7 Stadium; Attendance: 550; Referee: Mikhail Lavsky (Gomel)

13 March 2010	Neman Grodno	1–2	Shakhtyor Soligorsk	Grodno
15:00 UTC+3	Horbach 14'	Report	Grenkow 87'; Sitko 90+2'	Stadium: Neman Stadium; Attendance: 2,500; Referee: Antuan Mayorov (Minsk)

13 March 2010	BATE Borisov	7–0	MTZ-RIPO Minsk	Minsk
17:00 UTC+3	Kontsevoy 5', 16'; Nyakhaychyk 12'; Alyakhnovich 37'; Bressan 77', 83'; Alumona 86'	Report		Stadium: Football Manege; Attendance: 1,600; Referee: Yury Fomin (Volkovysk)

14 March 2010	DSK Gomel (II)	0–2	Dinamo Minsk	Mogilev
15:00 UTC+3		Report	Kislyak 18'; Hawrushka 90'	Stadium: SDYuSShOR-7 Stadium; Attendance: 500; Referee: Andrey Soroka (Smolevichi)

=== Second leg ===
17 March 2010	Torpedo Zhodino	3–1 (5–1 agg.)	Naftan Novopolotsk	Minsk
13:30 UTC+3	Brusnikin 32'; Kazlow 78', 85'	Report	Strypeykis 28'	Stadium: SOK Olimpiysky; Attendance: 700; Referee: Valery Vyalichka (Minsk)

17 March 2010	Shakhtyor Soligorsk	2–0 (4–1 agg.)	Neman Grodno	Minsk
16:00 UTC+3	Razhkow 86'; Balanovich 90+4'	Report		Stadium: Football Manege; Attendance: 750; Referee: Sergey Tsinkevich (Osipovichi)

17 March 2010	MTZ-RIPO Minsk	1–0 (1–7 agg.)	BATE Borisov	Minsk
19:30 UTC+3	Makas 15'	Report		Stadium: Football Manege; Attendance: 1,100; Referee: Sergey Sakharevich (Grodno)

18 March 2010	Dinamo Minsk	1–3 (3–3 (a) agg.)	DSK Gomel (II)	Minsk
14:00 UTC+3	Kislyak 42'	Report	Zabolotsky 54', 59'; Dobrovolyansky 90+1'	Stadium: KFP Minsk; Attendance: 500; Referee: Igor Kruk (Molodechno)

== Semifinals ==
The first legs were held on 24 March 2010 and the second legs were held on 28 March 2010. All games were played in Minsk on artificial grounds due to bad grass pitch conditions in March.

Team 1	Agg.	Team 2	1st leg	2nd leg
Shakhtyor Soligorsk	1–3	BATE Borisov	1–2	0–1
DSK Gomel (II)	2–2 (a)	Torpedo Zhodino	1–2	1–0

=== First leg ===
24 March 2010	Shakhtyor Soligorsk	1–2	BATE Borisov	Minsk
15:00 UTC+3	Kirenkin 78'	Report	Alumona 24' (pen.); Baha 60'	Stadium: KFP Minsk; Attendance: 1,000; Referee: Vitaly Sevostyanik (Grodno)

24 March 2010	DSK Gomel (II)	1–2	Torpedo Zhodino	Minsk
15:30 UTC+3	Dobrovolyansky 84'	Report	S.Kantsavy 29'; Lyavitski 43'	Stadium: SOK Olimpiysky; Attendance: 500; Referee: Dmitry Yevnevich (Minsk)

=== Second leg ===
28 March 2010	BATE Borisov	1–0 (3–1 agg.)	Shakhtyor Soligorsk	Minsk
15:00 UTC+3	A.Kontsevoy 62'	Report		Stadium: KFP Minsk; Attendance: 1,000; Referee: Andrey Zhukov (Minsk)

28 March 2010	Torpedo Zhodino	0–1 ((a) 2–2 agg.)	DSK Gomel (II)	Minsk
15:00 UTC+3		Report	Zabolotsky 39'	Stadium: SOK Olimpiysky; Attendance: 800; Referee: Sergey Sakharevich (Grodno)

== Final ==
23 May 2010
18:00 UTC+2

BATE Borisov	5–0	Torpedo Zhodino
Bressan 5', 64'; Rodionov 22', 69'; Kontsevoy 57'	Report

Dinamo Stadium, Minsk
Attendance: 10,200
Referee: Sergey Sakharevich (Grodno)

BATE:
GK	16	(Belarus) Syarhey Vyeramko
RB	4	(Belarus) Igor Shitov
CB	14	(Belarus) Artsyom Radzkow	(yellow card) 3'	(substituted off) 58'
CB	3	(Belarus) Sergey Sosnovski
LB	5	(Belarus) Alyaksandr Yurevich
DM	8	(Belarus) Alyaksandr Valadzko
DM	2	(Belarus) Dzmitry Likhtarovich (c)		(substituted off) 69'
RM	7	(Belarus) Artem Kontsevoy
CM	10	(Brazil) Renan Bressan	(yellow card) 38'
LM	13	(Belarus) Pavel Nyakhaychyk		(substituted off) 68'
CF	20	(Belarus) Vitali Rodionov
Substitutes:
GK	30	(Belarus) Alyaksandr Hutar
FW	11	(Russia) Aleksandr Alumona		(substituted on) 68'
MF	17	(Belarus) Alyaksandr Pawlaw
DF	18	(Belarus) Maksim Bardachow		(substituted on) 58'
MF	22	(Belarus) Ihar Stasevich
MF	23	(Belarus) Edhar Alyakhnovich		(substituted on) 69'
MF	32	(Russia) Vladimir Rzhevsky
Manager:
(Belarus) Viktor Goncharenko

TORPEDO-BELAZ:
GK	1	(Belarus) Uladzimir Bushma (c)
RB	4	(Ukraine) Serhiy Ponomarenko
CB	13	(Belarus) Yury Ryzhko	(yellow card) 56'
CB	5	(Belarus) Yawhen Branavitski		(substituted off) 34'
LB	3	(Belarus) Yury Astravukh
DM	23	(Nigeria) Simon Ogar Veron
RM	77	(Ukraine) Ihor Kryvobok	(yellow card) 34'	(substituted off) 76'
CM	10	(Belarus) Artur Lyavitski
CM	8	(Russia) Anton Brusnikin		(substituted off) 48'
LM	2	(Belarus) Artsyom Salavey	(yellow card) 11'
CF	11	(Belarus) Pavel Byahanski	(red card) 45+1'
Substitutes:
GK	16	(Belarus) Dzyanis Parechyn
FW	9	(Belarus) Dzyanis Karolik		(substituted on) 76'
MF	18	(Belarus) Illya Aleksiyevich
FW	19	(Belarus) Mikalay Shvydakow
MF	20	(Belarus) Alyaksey Martynets
DF	21	(Belarus) Valery Karshakevich	(yellow card) 63'	(substituted on) 34'
MF	27	(Belarus) Andrey Kazaryn		(substituted on) 48'
Manager:
(Belarus) Aleksandr Brazevich

== See also ==
- 2009 Belarusian Premier League
- 2010 Belarusian Premier League
