= 2010–11 Belarusian Cup =

Tournament details
- Country: Belarus
- Teams: 48

Final positions
- Champions: Gomel (2nd title)
- Runners-up: Neman Grodno

Tournament statistics
- Matches played: 53
- Goals scored: 163 (3.08 per match)
- Top goal scorer(s): Dzmitry Platonaw (7 goals)

The 2010–11 Belarusian Cup was the 20th season of the Belarusian annual cup competition. Contrary to the league season, it was conducted in a fall-spring rhythm. The first games were played on 23 July 2010. Gomel won the Cup and qualified for the UEFA Europa League third qualifying round.

== First round ==
32 teams started the competition in this round: 12 teams from the First League, 16 teams from Second League (all but DSK-2 Gomel and Gomel-2, both of which are reserve teams for First League clubs) and 4 amateur clubs. 4 First League clubs that were at the top of league table at the moment of the drawings (Gomel, Volna Pinsk, Granit Mikashevichi and DSK Gomel) and all 12 Premier League teams received a bye to the next round. Matches of this round were played on 23 and 24 June 2010.

23 June 2010	Gomelzheldortrans (III)	3–2	Klechesk Kletsk (III)	Gomel
17:00 UTC+3	Sigay 5', 86'; Dimitrov 52'	Report	Davydenko 63'; Lapshin 90+4'	Stadium: Lokomotiv Stadium; Attendance: 50; Referee: Vitaly Maslovsky (Minsk)

23 June 2010	Zvezda-BGU Minsk (III)	0–3	Gorodeya (III)	Minsk
17:00 UTC+3		Report	U. Makowski 4'; Tarlikovsky 73'; Sorochinskiy 75'	Stadium: RCOP-BGU Stadium; Attendance: 200; Referee: Vitaly Sevostyanik (Grodno)

23 June 2010	Orsha (III)	1–4	Slutsksakhar Slutsk (III)	Orsha
17:30 UTC+3	Khomich 60'	Report	Lis 19'; Zhdanovich 36'; Kamzolov 48'; Gurinovich 84'	Stadium: City Stadium; Attendance: 300; Referee: Vadim Panchenko (Mogilev)

23 June 2010	Spartak Shklov (III)	1–3	Slavia Mozyr (II)	Shklov
17:30 UTC+3	Yefremov 45'	Report	Trafimaw 40'; Raewski 49', 57'	Stadium: Spartak Stadium; Attendance: 100; Referee: Dmitry Digilevich (Zhodino)

23 June 2010	Zhlobin (III)	1–6	Vedrich-97 Rechitsa (II)	Zhlobin
18:00 UTC+3	Torop 88'	Report	Yudenkov 52', 65'; Baldykov 53'; Klop 80', 83', 87'	Stadium: Lokomotiv Stadium; Attendance: 200; Referee: Vasily Smirnykh (Minsk)

23 June 2010	Osipovichi (III)	1–1 (a.e.t.) (5–4 p)	Belcard Grodno (II)	Osipovichi
18:00 UTC+3	Kokhno 4'	Report	Tulinsky 61'	Stadium: Yunost Stadium; Attendance: 500; Referee: Andrey Soroka (Smolevichi)

23 June 2010	Livadiya Dzerzhinsk (III)	0–1	Baranovichi (II)	Dzerzhinsk
18:00 UTC+3		Report	Artyukh 38'	Stadium: City Stadium; Attendance: 150; Referee: Pavel Rudenkov (Gomel)

23 June 2010	Vertikal Kalinkovichi (III)	1–2	Rudensk (II)	Kalinkovichi
18:00 UTC+3	Chub 58' (pen.)	Report	Schutsky 45+1'; Tikhonovsky 80'	Stadium: Yunost Stadium; Attendance: 100; Referee: Roman Daylid (Brest)

23 June 2010	Gazovik Vitebsk (A)	2–3 (a.e.t.)	Kommunalnik Slonim (II)	Vitebsk
18:00 UTC+3	Bakevich 47'; Kitashev 107'	Report	Baskakov 4'; Gusar 115', 119'	Stadium: Vitebsky CSK; Attendance: 200; Referee: Dmitry Dmitriyev (Fanipol)

23 June 2010	Torpedo-MAZ Minsk (A)	0–7	Veras Nesvizh (II)	Minsk
18:00 UTC+3		Report	Lukashenko 13'; Denisyuk 26', 37', 42' (pen.), 79', 84'; Kiriyevich 32'	Stadium: KFP Minsk; Attendance: 200; Referee: Vladimir Ischenko (Rechitsa)

23 June 2010	Isloch Minsk Raion (A)	0–2	Khimik Svetlogorsk (II)	Minsk
18:00 UTC+3		Report	Novitskiy 17', 69'	Stadium: SOK Olimpiysky; Attendance: 200; Referee: Aleksey Martynov (Minsk)

23 June 2010	Beltransgaz Slonim (III)	0–1	Lida (II)	Slonim
18:00 UTC+3		Report	Tretyak 77'	Stadium: Yunost Stadium; Attendance: 400; Referee: Vladimir Serko (Grodno)

23 June 2010	Bereza-2010 (III)	0–0 (a.e.t.) (3–5 p)	SKVICH Minsk (II)	Bereza
18:00		Report		Stadium: DYuSSh-1 Stadium; Attendance: 500; Referee: Andrey Divakov (Mogilev)
	Penalties
	Kravchuk (penalty scored); Pinchuk (penalty scored); Zagvozdin (penalty missed); Gerasimenko (penalty scored)		(penalty scored) Markhel; (penalty scored) Mikhnyuk; (penalty scored) Golovnyov; (penalty scored) Bionchik; (penalty scored) Vitorsky

23 June 2010	Vigvam Smolevichi (III)	0–1	Polotsk (II)	Minsk
19:00 UTC+3		Report	Aleshchanka 85'	Stadium: BGATU Stadium; Attendance: 100; Referee: Dmitry Yevnevich (Minsk)

23 June 2010	Neman Mosty (III)	1–2	Smorgon (II)	Mosty
19:00 UTC+3	Leshanyuk 64'	Report	Bazey 11'; Fastaw 17'	Stadium: Neman Stadium; Attendance: 450; Referee: Viktor Verbitsky (Kobrin)

24 June 2010	Tekhnolog Mogilev (A)	1–4	Molodechno (III)	Mogilev
18:00 UTC+3	Akulenko 23'	Report	Grikhutik 12'; Narozhnik 44'; Luzhinsky 81', 90'	Stadium: MGUP Stadium; Attendance: 150; Referee: Maksim Dzeikala (Minsk)

== Round of 32 ==
The winners from the First Round were drawn against those clubs that received a bye to this round. The matches were played on 17 and 18 July 2010. The game involving BATE Borisov was rescheduled to July 7 due to team's participation in UEFA Champions League.

7 July 2010	Baranovichi (II)	0–3	BATE Borisov	Baranovichi
17:00 UTC+3		Report	Skavysh 37', 70'; Rodionov 45'	Stadium: Lokomotiv Stadium; Attendance: 3,000; Referee: Antuan Mayorov (Minsk)

17 July 2010	Gorodeya (III)	3–0	Granit Mikashevichi (II)	Gorodeya
15:00 UTC+3	Tsyarentsyew 58'; Syrokvashko 60'; Shkuratenko 76'	Report		Stadium: Gorodeya Stadium; Attendance: 500; Referee: Oleg Cherepnyov (Bobruisk)

17 July 2010	Gomelzheldortrans (III)	1–5	Neman Grodno	Gomel
17:00 UTC+3	Sigay 32'	Report	Bombel 53'; Ichim 71'; Savastsyanaw 76' (pen.); Yadeshka 86', 90+2'	Stadium: Lokomotiv Stadium; Attendance: 500; Referee: Dmitry Digilevich (Zhodino)

17 July 2010	Molodechno (III)	0–5	Gomel (II)	Molodechno
18:00 UTC+3		Report	D. Platonaw 17', 25'; Tsimashenka 50'; Litvinchuk 61'; Kolyadko 63'	Stadium: City Stadium; Attendance: 750; Referee: Anatoly Sednev (Mogilev)

17 July 2010	Veras Nesvizh (II)	0–3	Shakhtyor Soligorsk	Nesvizh
18:00 UTC+3		Report	Dzenisevich 64' (pen.), 90'; Nikiforenka 85'	Stadium: Urozhai Stadium; Attendance: 1,100; Referee: Sergey Sakharevich (Grodno)

17 July 2010	Osipovichi (III)	0–7	Volna Pinsk (II)	Osipovichi
18:00 UTC+3		Report	Volkov 6', 71'; Kosmach 23', 62', 90'; Naperkovsky 27'; Rogovik 65'	Stadium: Yunost Stadium; Attendance: 500; Referee: Mikhail Lavsky (Gomel)

17 July 2010	Slutsksakhar Slutsk (III)	0–7	Minsk	Slutsk
18:00 UTC+3		Report	Asipenka 14', 17'; Zyanko 63' (pen.), 74', 82', 85'; Razin 79'	Stadium: City Stadium; Attendance: 700; Referee: Vladimir Ischenko (Rechitsa)

17 July 2010	Khimik Svetlogorsk (II)	2–3 (a.e.t.)	Vitebsk	Svetlogorsk
18:00 UTC+3	Dashuk 5'; Sidorenko 88'	Report	Sorokin 57'; Usaw 74'; Vasyutsin 118'	Stadium: Bumazhnik Stadium; Attendance: 1,000; Referee: Andrey Soroka (Smolevichi)

17 July 2010	Polotsk (II)	0–1	DSK Gomel (II)	Polotsk
18:00 UTC+3		Report	Tkach 23'	Stadium: Spartak Stadium; Attendance: 150; Referee: Vladimir Serko (Grodno)

17 July 2010	Lida (II)	1–3	Belshina Bobruisk	Lida
18:00 UTC+3	Dovgilevich 81'	Report	Misyuk 1'; Lanko 28', 56'	Stadium: Yunost Stadium; Attendance: 1,500; Referee: Oleg Murashkevich (Novopolotsk)

18 July 2010	Kommunalnik Slonim (II)	2–0	Torpedo Zhodino	Slonim
18:00 UTC+3	Sokolovsky 30'; Simakovich 76'	Report		Stadium: Yunost Stadium; Attendance: 700; Referee: Pavel Rudenkov (Gomel)

18 July 2010	Vedrich-97 Rechitsa (II)	0–2	Dinamo Brest	Rechytsa
18:00 UTC+3		Report	Khvashchynski 9'; Kibuk 53'	Stadium: Central Stadium; Attendance: 300; Referee: Nikita Pyreyev (Minsk)

18 July 2010	SKVICH Minsk (II)	1–1 (a.e.t.) (2–4 p)	Partizan Minsk	Minsk
18:00 UTC+3	Markhel 57'	Report	Zubovich 35'	Stadium: Traktor Stadium; Attendance: 1,000; Referee: Denis Scherbakov (Minsk)
	Penalties
	Markhel (penalty missed); Lomako (penalty scored); Golovnyov (penalty scored); Yawseyew (penalty missed)		(penalty scored) Mendy; (penalty scored) Maewski; (penalty scored) Makas; (penalty scored) Strockis

18 July 2010	Rudensk (II)	2–1	Dnepr Mogilev	Maryina Horka
18:00 UTC+3	Tikhonovsky 44'; Nozdrin-Plotnitsky 54'	Report	Yurchenko 71'	Stadium: City Stadium; Attendance: 1,100; Referee: Ivan Safaryan (Minsk)

18 July 2010	Slavia Mozyr (II)	0–1	Naftan Novopolotsk	Mozyr
18:30 UTC+3		Report	Zuew 6'	Stadium: Yunost Stadium; Attendance: 500; Referee: Igor Kruk (Molodechno)

18 July 2010	Smorgon (II)	1–2	Dinamo Minsk	Smorgon
19:00 UTC+3	Fastaw 26'	Report	Shkabara 63'; Putsila 85'	Stadium: Yunost Stadium; Attendance: 1,200; Referee: Vadim Panchenko (Mogilev)

== Round of 16 ==
Unlike few previous seasons, this round was played as a single-legged ties. The games were played on 22 September, 27 October and 27 November 2010.

22 September 2010	Naftan Novopolotsk	4–2	Gorodeya (III)	Novopolotsk
15:30 UTC+3	Dzegtseraw 13'; Hawrushka 24', 53'; Rudzik 43'	Report	Tsyarentsyew 44'; Tarlikovsky 89'	Stadium: Atlant Stadium; Attendance: 500; Referee: Andrey Zhukov (Minsk)

22 September 2010	Belshina Bobruisk	2–1 (a.e.t.)	Kommunalnik Slonim (II)	Bobruisk
16:00 UTC+3	Lisitsa 44'; Kovalenko 97'	Report	Sheleg 45+1'	Stadium: Spartak Stadium; Attendance: 1,500; Referee: Andrey Soroka (Smolevichi)

22 September 2010	Rudensk (II)	0–5	Gomel (II)	Maryina Horka
16:00 UTC+3		Report	Kantsavy 8'; D. Platonaw 29', 51'; Tsimashenka 69'; Yudenkov 89'	Stadium: City Stadium; Attendance: 300; Referee: Vadim Panchenko (Mogilev)

22 September 2010	Minsk	3–1 (a.e.t.)	DSK Gomel (II)	Minsk
16:00 UTC+3	Hihevich 53'; Asipenka 105', 114' (pen.)	Report	Vaskow 85'	Stadium: Torpedo Stadium; Attendance: 350; Referee: Oleg Murashkevich (Novopolotsk)

22 September 2010	Vitebsk	1–1 (a.e.t.) (4–5 p)	Neman Grodno	Vitebsk
17:00	Sļesarčuks 19'	Report	Kavalyonak 28'	Stadium: Vitebsky CSK; Attendance: 300; Referee: Sergey Tsinkevich (Osipovichi)
	Penalties
	Usaw (penalty scored); Truhaw (penalty scored); Kolomyts (penalty scored); Kobets (penalty missed); Sļesarčuks (penalty scored)		(penalty scored) Savastsyanaw; (penalty scored) Dm. Lebedzew; (penalty scored) Dzemidovich; (penalty scored) Valadzyankow; (penalty scored) Kavalyonak

22 September 2010	Shakhtyor Soligorsk	4–0 (a.e.t.)	Volna Pinsk (II)	Soligorsk
19:00 UTC+3	Alumona 92', 97'; Sitko 98'; Vyarheychyk 109'	Report		Stadium: Stroitel Stadium; Attendance: 900; Referee: Denis Scherbakov (Minsk)

27 October 2010	Partizan Minsk	1–0	Dinamo Minsk	Minsk
15:00 UTC+3	Ledesma 79'	Report		Stadium: Traktor Stadium; Attendance: 1,500; Referee: Valery Vyalichka (Minsk)

27 November 2010	BATE Borisov	0–1	Dinamo Brest	Borisov
16:00 UTC+3		Report	Yanush 17'	Stadium: City Stadium; Attendance: 2,285; Referee: Vadim Panchenko (Mogilev)

== Quarterfinals ==
The first legs were played on 1 and 2 March 2011 and the second legs on 5 and 6 March 2011.

Team 1	Agg.	Team 2	1st leg	2nd leg
Shakhtyor Soligorsk	3–2	Dinamo Brest	2–1	1–1
Belshina Bobruisk	2–1	Minsk	0–1	2–0
Partizan Minsk (II)	2–3	Gomel	0–0	2–3
Neman Grodno	3–1	Naftan Novopolotsk	1–1	2–0

=== First leg ===
1 March 2011	Shakhtyor Soligorsk	2–1	Dinamo Brest	Soligorsk
15:00 UTC+3	Kirenkin 19', 56'	Report	Tarasenka 79'	Stadium: Shakhtyor Stadium; Attendance: 2,000; Referee: Aleksei Kulbakov (Gomel)

2 March 2011	Belshina Bobruisk	0–1	Minsk	Mogilev
14:00 UTC+3		Report	Razin 90+2'	Stadium: SDYuSShOR-7 Stadium; Attendance: 400; Referee: Igor Kruk (Molodechno)

2 March 2011	Partizan Minsk	0–0	Gomel	Minsk
17:00 UTC+3		Report		Stadium: Football Manege; Attendance: 1,500; Referee: Gennady Levchuk (Malaryta)

2 March 2011	Neman Grodno	1–1	Naftan Novopolotsk	Grodno
19:00 UTC+3	Dzemidovich 65'	Report	Khlebosolov 89'	Stadium: Neman Stadium; Attendance: 4,000; Referee: Oleg Cherepnyov (Bobruisk)

=== Second leg ===
5 March 2011	Dinamo Brest	1–1 (2–3 agg.)	Shakhtyor Soligorsk	Brest
15:00 UTC+3	Chelidze 25'	Report	Yanushkevich 63'	Stadium: Dinamo Stadium; Attendance: 2,950; Referee: Valery Vyalichka (Minsk)

6 March 2011	Naftan Novopolotsk	0–2 (1–3 agg.)	Neman Grodno	Mogilev
15:00 UTC+3		Report	Frunză 48'; Dzenisevich 86'	Stadium: SDYuSShOR-7 Stadium; Attendance: 400; Referee: Denis Scherbakov (Minsk)

6 March 2011	Gomel	3–2 (3–2 agg.)	Partizan Minsk	Gomel
15:00 UTC+3	Kuzmyanok 2'; D.Platonaw 72' (pen.), 90+3'	Report	Korsak 32'; Makas 69'	Stadium: DYuSSh-8 Stadium; Attendance: 1,500; Referee: Vadim Panchenko (Mogilev)

6 March 2011	Minsk	0–2 (1–2 agg.)	Belshina Bobruisk	Minsk
18:00 UTC+3		Report	Branfilov 30' (pen.); Lisovyi 36'	Stadium: Football Manege; Attendance: 1,000; Referee: Yury Fomin (Volkovysk)

== Semifinals ==
The first legs will be played on 13 March 2011 and the second legs on 20 March 2011.

Team 1	Agg.	Team 2	1st leg	2nd leg
Belshina Bobruisk	0–1	Neman Grodno	0–1	0–0
Gomel	4–2	Shakhtyor Soligorsk	2–1	2–1

=== First leg ===
13 March 2011	Belshina Bobruisk	0–1	Neman Grodno	Mogilev
15:00 UTC+3		Report	Frunză 14'	Stadium: SDYuShOR-7 Stadium; Attendance: 400; Referee: Dmitry Yevnevich (Minsk)

13 March 2011	Gomel	2–1	Shakhtyor Soligorsk	Gomel
16:00 UTC+3	Zuew 42'; Kantsavy 70'	Report	Kamarowski 40'	Stadium: DYuSSh-8 Stadium; Attendance: 1,400; Referee: Sergey Sakharevich (Grodno)

=== Second leg ===
20 March 2011	Shakhtyor Soligorsk	1–2 (2–4 agg.)	Gomel	Soligorsk
15:00 UTC+3	Grenkow 17'	Report	Kuzmyanok 6'; D.Platonaw 14' (pen.)	Stadium: Stroitel Stadium; Attendance: 2,000; Referee: Sergey Tsinkevich (Osipovichi)

20 March 2011	Neman Grodno	0–0 (1–0 agg.)	Belshina Bobruisk	Grodno
16:00 UTC+3		Report		Stadium: Neman Stadium; Attendance: 7,500; Referee: Gennady Levchuk (Malaryta)

== Final ==
29 May 2011
16:50 UTC+3

Neman Grodno	0–2	Gomel
	Report	Rybak 88' (o.g.); Covalenco 90' (o.g.)

Traktor Stadium, Minsk
Attendance: 9,000
Referee: Sergey Tsinkevich (Osipovichi)

NEMAN:
GK	16	(Belarus) Syarhey Chernik (c)
RB	17	(Belarus) Andrey Horbach		(substituted off) 66'
CB	2	(Moldova) Alexandr Covalenco
CB	15	(Belarus) Pavel Plaskonny
LB	4	(Belarus) Vital Nadziewski		(substituted off) 90+1'
DM	18	(Belarus) Pavel Rybak
RM	13	(Belarus) Vadzim Dzemidovich
CM	69	(Belarus) Alyaksey Lyahchylin		(substituted off) 70'
CM	8	(Belarus) Oleg Strakhanovich	(yellow card) 76'
LF	7	(Belarus) Alyaksey Suchkow
CF	20	(Moldova) Viorel Frunză
Substitutes:
GK	31	(Belarus) Raman Astapenka
MF	6	(Belarus) Syarhey Lyavitski
FW	10	(Belarus) Dzmitry Kavalyonak		(substituted on) 90+1'
FW	11	(Belarus) Dzmitry Lebedzew		(substituted on) 66'
MF	14	(Belarus) Alyaksandr Anyukevich
MF	23	(Serbia) Nemanja Cvetković
FW	88	(Belarus) Pavel Savitskiy		(substituted on) 70'
Manager:
(Russia) Aleksandr Koreshkov

GOMEL:
GK	1	(Belarus) Uladzimir Bushma
RB	10	(Belarus) Pavel Yawseenka
CB	26	(Belarus) Syarhey Kantsavy (c)
CB	5	(Estonia) Andrei Stepanov
LB	6	(Belarus) Mikalay Kashewski
DM	2	(Ukraine) Yevhen Shmakov	(yellow card) 90+2'	(substituted off) 90+3'
RM	31	(Belarus) Alyaksey Tsimashenka		(substituted off) 77'
CM	7	(Belarus) Syarhey Kazeka
CM	21	(Belarus) Artur Lyavitski
LM	22	(Belarus) Ihar Stasevich
CF	11	(Belarus) Yawhen Zuew		(substituted off) 90'
Substitutes:
GK	33	(Serbia) Srđan Ostojić
MF	3	(Belarus) Syarhey Matsveychyk		(substituted on) 90+3'
MF	8	(Belarus) Illya Aleksiyevich		(substituted on) 77'
FW	9	(Belarus) Andrey Lyasyuk
DF	19	(Belarus) Ihar Maltsaw
MF	23	(Belarus) Pavel Platonaw
DF	25	(Belarus) Ihar Kuzmyanok		(substituted on) 90'
Manager:
(Belarus) Oleg Kubarev

== See also ==
- 2010 Belarusian Premier League
