= 2012 Belarusian Super Cup =

BATE Borisov	Gomel
0	2
- Date: 6 March 2012
- Venue: Football Manege, Minsk
- Referee: Sergey Tsinkevich
- Attendance: 1,700

The 2012 Belarusian Super Cup was held on 6 March 2012 between the 2011 Belarusian Premier League champions BATE Borisov and the 2010–11 Belarusian Cup winners Gomel. Gomel won the match 2–0 and became the first team other than BATE to win the trophy.

== Match details ==
6 March 2012
20:00 UTC+3

BATE Borisov	0 – 2	Gomel
	Report	V. Hleb 27', 60'

Football Manege, Minsk
Attendance: 1,700
Referee: Sergey Tsinkevich (Osipovichi)

BATE:
GK	30	(Belarus) Alyaksandr Hutar
DF	5	(Belarus) Alyaksandr Yurevich
DF	14	(Belarus) Artsyom Radzkow
DF	33	(Belarus) Dzyanis Palyakow	(yellow card) 8'	(substituted off) 65'
DF	18	(Belarus) Maksim Bardachow
MF	25	(Belarus) Dzmitry Baha
MF	2	(Belarus) Dzmitry Likhtarovich (c)		(substituted off) 46'
MF	17	(Belarus) Alyaksandr Pawlaw		(substituted off) 65'
MF	10	(Belarus) Renan Bressan		(substituted off) 83'
FW	13	(Belarus) Dzmitry Mazalewski
FW	4	(Belarus) Artem Kontsevoy		(substituted off) 83'
Substitutes:
GK	16	(Belarus) Andrey Shcharbakow
MF	8	(Belarus) Alyaksandr Valadzko		(substituted on) 65'
FW	9	(Brazil) Maycon		(substituted on) 65'
FW	15	(Belarus) Maksim Skavysh
DF	22	(Serbia) Marko Simić		(substituted on) 65'
MF	26	(Belarus) Mikhail Gordeichuk		(substituted on) 83'
MF	77	(Belarus) Filip Rudzik		(substituted on) 46'
Manager:
(Belarus) Viktor Goncharenko

GOMEL:
GK	1	(Belarus) Uladzimir Bushma
DF	3	(Belarus) Syarhey Matsveychyk		(substituted off) 85'
DF	25	(Belarus) Ihar Kuzmyanok
DF	6	(Belarus) Mikalay Kashewski (c)	(yellow card) 35'
DF	13	(Belarus) Dzmitry Klimovich
MF	8	(Belarus) Illya Aleksiyevich		(substituted off) 65'
MF	2	(Ukraine) Ihor Voronkov
MF	7	(Belarus) Syarhey Kazeka		(substituted off) 80'
MF	21	(Belarus) Artur Lyavitski
MF	9	(Belarus) Vyacheslav Hleb		(substituted off) 72'
FW	11	(Belarus) Andrey Sherakow		(substituted off) 88'
Substitutes:
GK	33	(Serbia) Srđan Ostojić
MF	5	(Belarus) Pavel Kirylchyk		(substituted on) 80'
MF	10	(Belarus) Pavel Yawseenka		(substituted on) 85'
MF	18	(Belarus) Alyaksey Tsimashenka		(substituted on) 88'
FW	22	(Belarus) Dmitry Gomza
FW	32	(Belarus) Dzmitry Platonaw		(substituted on) 72'
FW	87	(Belarus) Vadzim Dzemidovich		(substituted on) 65'
Manager:
(Belarus) Oleg Kubarev

== See also ==
- 2011 Belarusian Premier League
- 2010–11 Belarusian Cup
