= Vasyutin =

Vasyutin or Vasyutsin (Russian: Васютин) is a Russian surname. Notable people with the surname include:

- Aleksandr Vasyutin (born 1995), Russian footballer
- Sergei Vasyutin (born 1957), Russian football manager
- Vladimir Vasyutin (1952–2002), Russian cosmonaut
- Yury Vasyutsin (born 1978), Belarusian footballer
