= Brusnikin =

Brusnikin (Russian: Брусникин, from брусника meaning cowberry) is a Russian masculine surname, its feminine counterpart is Brusnikina. It may refer to

- Anton Brusnikin (born 1986), Russian football player
- Olga Brusnikina (born 1978), Russian synchronized swimmer
