= Oleg Kubarev =

Belarusian footballer and manager

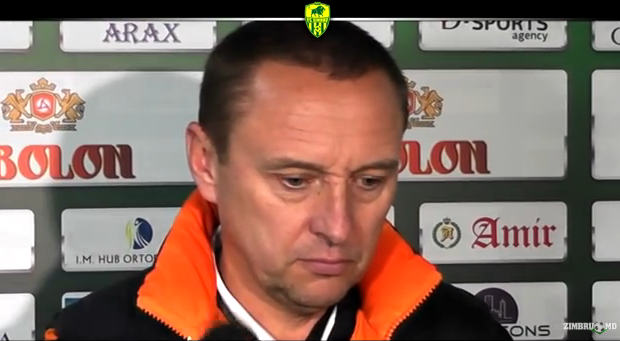
- Kubarev in 2014

Personal information
- Date of birth: 8 February 1966 (age 60)
- Place of birth: Zhodino, Minsk Oblast, Belarusian SSR
- Position: Midfielder

Senior career*
Years	Team	Apps	(Gls)
1987	BelAZ Zhodino		
1988	SKAF Minsk		
1988	Vityaz Vitebsk	10	(0)
1989	BelAZ Zhodino		
1990–1991	Metallurg Molodechno		
1992	BelAZ Zhodino	8	(1)
1992–1994	Molodechno	53	(2)
1994	Samotlor-XXI Nizhnevartovsk	17	(3)
1995	Vairogs Rēzekne	27	(0)
1996	Yelimay Semipalatinsk	7	(0)
1996	Torpedo-Kadino Mogilev	9	(0)
1997–1998	Lida	25	(1)
1998–1999	Torpedo Zhodino	44	(7)
2000–2001	SKAF Minsk	31	(3)

Managerial career
- 2001: SKAF Minsk (assistant, player-coach)
- 2001–2003: Lokomotiv Minsk (assistant)
- 2003: Darida Minsk Raion (assistant)
- 2003–2004: Darida Minsk Raion
- 2004: Darida Minsk Raion (assistant)
- 2005–2006: Minsk (assistant)
- 2006–2009: Torpedo Zhodino
- 2009–2012: Gomel
- 2013: Spartaks Jūrmala
- 2013–2014: Zimbru Chișinău
- 2015: Dacia Chișinău
- 2016: Spartaks Jūrmala
- 2016–2017: Shakhtyor Soligorsk
- 2017–2018: Torpedo-BelAZ Zhodino
- 2019: Riga
- 2019–2020: Jelgava
- 2021–2022: Krumkachy Minsk
- 2022–2023: Tajikistan U20
- 2024–2025: Arsenal Dzerzhinsk (assistant)
- 2025–2026: Zimbru Chișinău
- * Club domestic league appearances and goals

Oleg Kubarev (Belarusian: Алег Кубареў; Russian: Олег Кубарев; born 8 February 1966) is a Belarusian football manager and former footballer (midfielder).

== Career ==
From September 2013 to December 2014 he was head coach of Zimbru Chișinău in the Moldovan National Division.

== Honours ==
=== As player ===
Metallurg Molodechno

- Belarusian SSR League: 1991
- Soviet Amateur Cup: 1991

=== As coach ===
Gomel

- Belarusian Cup: 2010–11
- Belarusian Super Cup: 2012

Zimbru Chișinău

- Moldovan Cup: 2013–14
- Moldovan Super Cup: 2014

Spartaks Jūrmala

- Latvian Higher League: 2016
