= Chelidze =

Chelidze is a Georgian (Georgian: ჭელიძე) surname. Notable people with the surname include:

- Giorgi Chelidze (born 1986), Georgian footballer
- Zaza Chelidze (born 1987), Georgian footballer
