= Sergey Levitsky =

Sergey Levitsky may refer to:

- Sergey Lvovich Levitsky (1819–1898), photographer
- Syarhey Lyavitski (born 1990), footballer
