= Astapenka =

Astapenka is a surname. Notable people with the surname include:

- Raman Astapenka (born 1980), Belarusian footballer
- Vladzimir Astapenka (born 1962), Belarusian diplomat
