= Roman Gaev =

Belarusian footballer

Personal information
- Date of birth: 20 January 1989 (age 37)
- Place of birth: Bobruisk, Byelorussian SSR, Soviet Union
- Height: 1.83 m (6 ft 0 in)
- Position: Defender

Youth career
- 2004–2008: Dinamo Minsk

Senior career*
| Years | Team | Apps | (Gls) |
| 2004 | Dnepr Rogachev | 1 | (0) |
| 2008–2009 | Dinamo Minsk | 9 | (0) |
| 2010 | DSK Gomel | 15 | (0) |
| 2011 | Partizan Minsk | 19 | (0) |
| 2012 | SKVICH Minsk | 18 | (0) |
| 2013–2014 | Isloch Minsk Raion | 44 | (1) |
| 2015–2016 | Krumkachy Minsk | 36 | (2) |
| 2016–2019 | Torpedo Minsk | 63 | (2) |
| 2019 | Underdog Chist | 12 | (3) |
| 2020 | Krumkachy Minsk | 9 | (0) |
| 2020–2021 | Rogachev | 17 | (3) |
| 2021 | KP Starogard Gdański | 0 | (0) |
| 2022 | GKS Głuchołazy | 2 | (0) |
| 2022 | Tempo Rzeszotary | 10 | (2) |

International career
| 2008–2009 | Belarus U21 | 3 | (0) |
- * Club domestic league appearances and goals

Roman Gaev (Belarusian: Раман Гаеў; Russian: Роман Гаев; born 20 January 1989) is a Belarusian former professional footballer who played as a defender.
