= Srđan Ostojić =

Serbian footballer

Personal information
- Full name: Srđan Ostojić
- Date of birth: 10 January 1983 (age 43)
- Place of birth: Bežanija, SFR Yugoslavia
- Height: 1.91 m (6 ft 3 in)
- Position: Goalkeeper

Senior career*
Years	Team	Apps	(Gls)
2001–2002	Lokomotiva Beograd		
2003–2005	Budućnost Dobanovci	44	(0)
2006	Železničar Beograd	10	(0)
2006–2007	Sinđelić Beograd	8	(0)
2007–2010	Bežanija	77	(0)
2011–2012	Gomel	9	(0)
2012	Bežanija	3	(0)
2013	Shakhtyor Soligorsk	2	(0)
2014–2015	Bežanija	31	(0)
2015	Drina Zvornik	9	(0)
2016	Zemun	13	(0)
2016	Akzhayik	5	(0)
2017–2018	Zemun	9	(0)
2018	Arema	4	(0)
2019	Zemun	0	(0)
Total		224	(0)
- * Club domestic league appearances and goals

Srđan Ostojić (Serbian Cyrillic: Срђан Остојић; born 10 January 1983) is a Serbian former football goalkeeper.

== Honours ==
Gomel

- Belarusian Cup: 2011
- Belarusian Super Cup: 2012
