= Yawhen Branavitski =

Belarusian footballer

Personal information
- Date of birth: 15 May 1981 (age 45)
- Place of birth: Soligorsk, Belarusian SSR
- Height: 1.87 m (6 ft 1 1/2 in)
- Position: Midfielder

Youth career
- 1998–1999: RUOR Minsk

Senior career*
Years	Team	Apps	(Gls)
1999	RUOR Minsk	5	(0)
2000	Belaruskaliy Soligorsk	11	(0)
2001–2004	Shakhtyor Soligorsk	11	(0)
2003	→ BATE Borisov (loan)	0	(0)
2004	Vorskla-Naftohaz Poltava	5	(0)
2005	Slavia Mozyr	15	(1)
2006	Heko Czermno	13	(1)
2006–2009	Minsk	55	(7)
2010	Torpedo Zhodino	7	(1)
2011	Gorodeya	21	(0)
2012	SKVICH Minsk	13	(0)
2013	Vedrich-97 Rechytsa	14	(0)
2013–2014	Khimik Svetlogorsk	33	(0)

International career
2001	Belarus U21	1	(0)
- * Club domestic league appearances and goals as of 1 December 2014

Yawhen Branavitski (Belarusian: Яўген Бранавіцкі; Russian: Евгений Брановицкий; born 15 May 1981) is a retired Belarusian professional footballer. His last club was Khimik Svetlogorsk.

== Career ==
Born in Soligorsk, Branavitski began playing football in FC RUOR Minsk's youth system. He joined FC Shakhtyor Soligorsk's senior team and made his Belarusian Premier League debut in 2001.
