= Alyaksandr Dzemidovich =

Belarusian professional footballer

Personal information
- Date of birth: 26 April 1989 (age 37)
- Place of birth: Brest, Belarusian SSR
- Height: 1.84 m (6 ft 1/2 in)
- Position: Defender

Youth career
- 2006–2010: Dinamo Brest

Senior career*
Years	Team	Apps	(Gls)
2008–2012	Dinamo Brest	17	(0)
2012–2013	Granit Mikashevichi	39	(1)
2014	Lida	26	(2)
2015	Baranovichi	24	(1)
2016	Smorgon	11	(1)
2016–2017	Neman Grodno	0	(0)
2017	→ Smolevichi-STI (loan)	28	(2)
2018–2019	Rukh Brest	28	(6)
2019	Volna Pinsk	13	(1)
2020	Granit Mikashevichi	22	(1)
2021	Brestzhilstroy	9	(0)
- * Club domestic league appearances and goals as of 31 December 2021

Alyaksandr Dzemidovich (Belarusian: Аляксандр Дземідовіч; Russian: Александр Демидович; born 26 April 1989) is a Belarusian former professional footballer.

His brother Vadzim Dzemidovich is also a professional footballer.
