= Mikalay Kashewski =

Belarusian football coach and former player

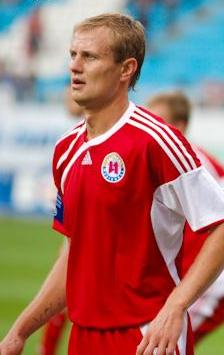

Personal information
- Full name: Mikalay Mikalayavich Kashewski
- Date of birth: 5 October 1980 (age 46)
- Place of birth: Zhodzina, Belarusian SSR, Soviet Union
- Height: 1.86 m (6 ft 1 in)
- Position: Midfielder

Team information
- Current team: Torpedo-BelAZ Zhodino (assistant coach)

Youth career
- 1997–1998: Torpedo Zhodino

Senior career*
Years	Team	Apps	(Gls)
1998	Real Minsk	4	(0)
1999	Torpedo Zhodino	29	(8)
2000	Akadem-Slavia Minsk	28	(5)
2001	Darida Minsk Raion	21	(3)
2002–2003	Lokomotiv Minsk	37	(12)
2003–2004	Metalurh Zaporizhzhia	6	(1)
2003	→ Metalurh-2 Zaporizhzhia	3	(1)
2004–2006	Kryvbas Kryvyi Rih	62	(11)
2006–2008	Metalurh Zaporizhzhia	52	(3)
2008–2010	Illichivets Mariupol	50	(4)
2010	Tavriya Simferopol	2	(0)
2011–2012	Gomel	58	(13)
2013–2014	Shakhtyor Soligorsk	51	(0)
2015	Vitebsk	24	(1)
2016	Spartaks Jūrmala	5	(0)

International career
2006–2009	Belarus	13	(0)

Managerial career
- 2017: Shakhtyor Soligorsk (assistant)
- 2018–: Torpedo-BelAZ Zhodino (assistant)
- * Club domestic league appearances and goals

Mikalay Mikalayavich Kashewski (Belarusian: Мікалай Мікалаявіч Кашэўскі, Russian: Николай Николаевич Кашевский, Nikolay Nikolayevich Kashevsky; born 5 October 1980) is a Belarusian football coach and former player.

== Career ==
Kashewski has made 13 appearances for the Belarus national football team.

== Honours ==
Gomel

- Belarusian Cup winner: 2010–11
- Belarusian Super Cup winner: 2012

Shakhtyor Soligorsk

- Belarusian Cup winner: 2013–14

Spartaks Jūrmala

- Latvian Higher League champion: 2016
