= Yury Shumanski =

Belarusian footballer

Personal information
- Date of birth: 21 September 1980 (age 46)
- Place of birth: Zhodino, Belarusian SSR
- Position: Defender

Youth career
- 1998–1999: Torpedo Zhodino

Senior career*
Years	Team	Apps	(Gls)
1999–2006	Torpedo Zhodino	180	(9)
2006–2007	Belshina Bobruisk	35	(0)
2008	Lokomotiv Minsk	27	(1)
2009–2010	Neman Grodno	36	(0)

International career
2001	Belarus U21	2	(0)
- * Club domestic league appearances and goals as of 17 March 2011

Yury Shumanski (Belarusian: Юрый Шуманскі; Russian: Юрий Шуманский; born 21 September 1980) is a retired Belarusian professional footballer.

== Career ==
Shumanski started his career with Torpedo Zhodino.
