= Dzmitry Platonaw =

Belarusian footballer (born 1986)

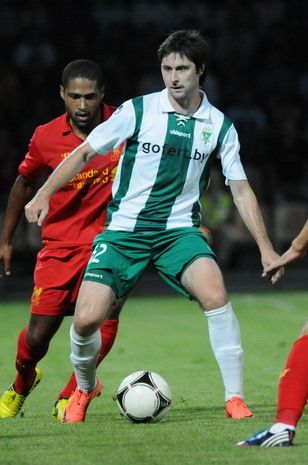
- Platonaw with Gomel in 2012

Personal information
- Date of birth: 7 February 1986 (age 40)
- Place of birth: Minsk, Belarusian SSR
- Height: 1.79 m (5 ft 10 in)
- Position: Midfielder

Youth career
- 2001–2004: Zvezda-BGU Minsk

Senior career*
Years	Team	Apps	(Gls)
2005	Zvezda-BGU Minsk	23	(7)
2006–2008	BATE Borisov	37	(3)
2008	→ Granit Mikashevichi (loan)	23	(3)
2009	Shakhtyor Soligorsk	24	(3)
2010–2012	Gomel	63	(35)
2013–2015	Torpedo-BelAZ Zhodino	53	(16)
2016–2017	Spartaks Jūrmala	36	(16)
2018	RFS	12	(1)

International career
2005–2009	Belarus U21	17	(0)
- * Club domestic league appearances and goals

Dzmitry Platonaw (Belarusian: Дзмітрый Платонаў; Russian: Дмитрий Платонов; born 7 February 1986) is a retired Belarusian football midfielder. He is a twin brother of Pavel Platonaw.

== Career ==
Platonaw played for BATE Borisov in the preliminary rounds of the 2006–07 UEFA Cup and the 2007–08 UEFA Champions League.

== Honours ==
BATE Borisov

- Belarusian Premier League: 2006, 2007
- Belarusian Cup: 2005–06

Gomel

- Belarusian Cup: 2010–11
- Belarusian Super Cup: 2012

Torpedo-BelAZ Zhodino

- Belarusian Cup: 2015–16

Spartaks Jūrmala

- Latvian Higher League: 2016, 2017
