= Ihar Kuzmyanok =

Belarusian footballer

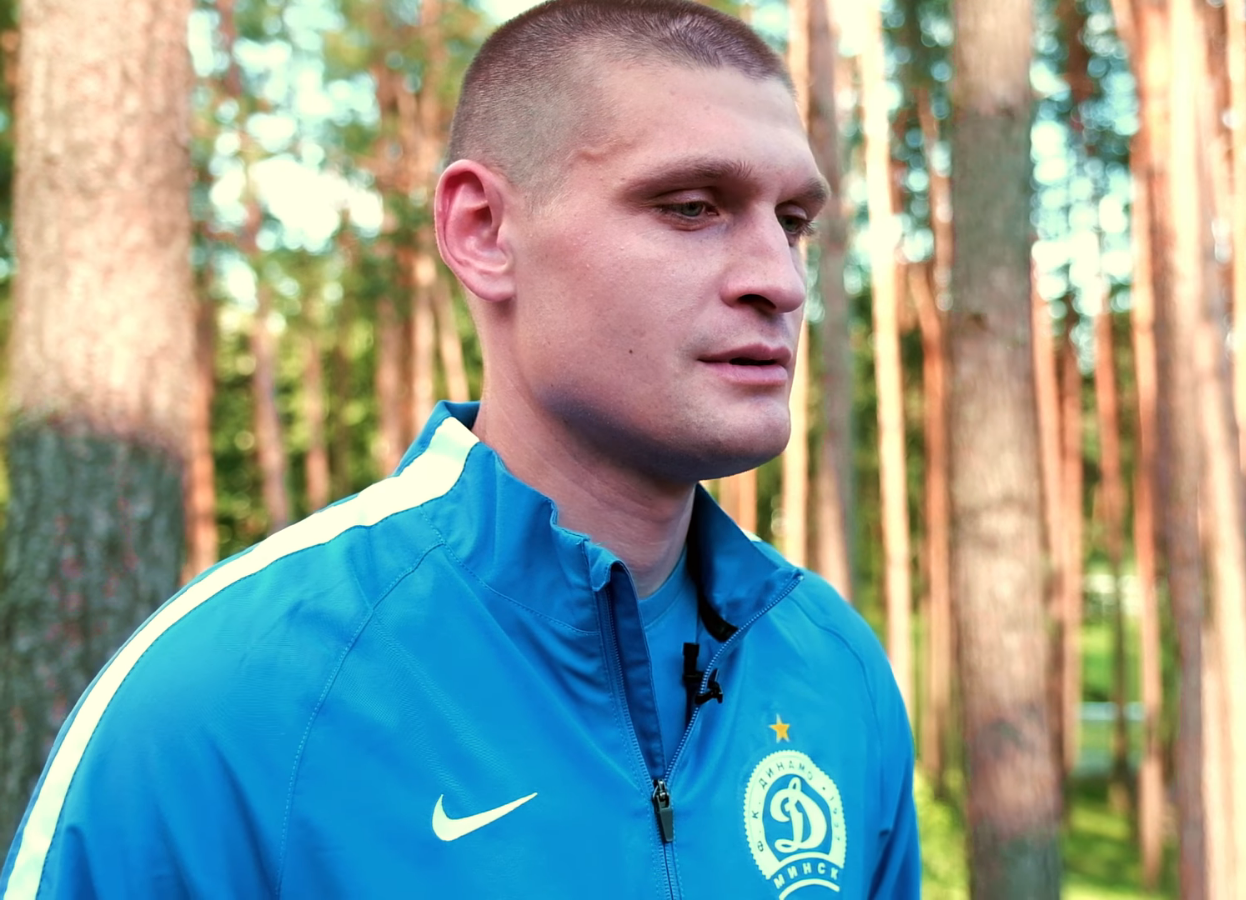

Personal information
- Date of birth: 6 July 1990 (age 36)
- Place of birth: Zhlobin, Gomel Oblast, Belarusian SSR
- Height: 1.90 m (6 ft 3 in)
- Position: Defender

Team information
- Current team: Lokomotiv Gomel
- Number: 25

Youth career
- 2006–2007: Gomel

Senior career*
Years	Team	Apps	(Gls)
2008–2012	Gomel	92	(2)
2013–2014	Dinamo Minsk	5	(0)
2014	→ Shakhtyor Soligorsk (loan)	20	(1)
2015–2016	Shakhtyor Soligorsk	49	(2)
2017	Dinamo Minsk	9	(0)
2018	Shakhtyor Soligorsk	14	(3)
2019	Torpedo-BelAZ Zhodino	11	(2)
2020	Isloch Minsk Raion	14	(3)
2021–2023	Gomel	20	(1)
2024–	Lokomotiv Gomel	16	(1)

International career
2010–2012	Belarus U21	14	(1)
2012	Belarus Olympic	6	(0)
- * Club domestic league appearances and goals as of 10 December 2024

Ihar Andreyevich Kuzmyanok (Belarusian: Ігар Андрэевiч Кузьмянок; Russian: Игорь Андреевич Кузьменок; born 6 July 1990) is a Belarusian professional footballer who plays for Lokomotiv Gomel.

== International career ==
He competed for Belarus at the 2012 Summer Olympics.

== Honours ==
Gomel

- Belarusian Cup winner: 2010–11, 2021–22
- Belarusian Super Cup winner: 2012

Shakhtyor Soligorsk

- Belarusian Cup winner: 2013–14, 2018–19
