= Andrey Arhiptsaw =

Belarusian professional footballer

Personal information
- Date of birth: 5 July 1984 (age 42)
- Place of birth: Gomel, Belarusian SSR
- Position: Midfielder

Youth career
- 2001–2002: Gomel

Senior career*
Years	Team	Apps	(Gls)
2003–2004	Gomel	1	(0)
2005	ZLiN Gomel	27	(2)
2006–2008	Vedrich-97 Rechitsa	65	(13)
2009	Smorgon	7	(0)
2009–2010	Slavia Mozyr	36	(3)
2011	DSK Gomel	26	(2)
2012–2015	Khimik Svetlogorsk	106	(9)
2016–2017	Lokomotiv Gomel	46	(5)
2018	Sputnik Rechitsa	27	(7)
2019–2020	Khimik Svetlogorsk	51	(3)
2021	Leskhoz Gomel	11	(0)
- * Club domestic league appearances and goals as of 31 December 2021

Andrey Arhiptsaw (Belarusian: Андрэй Архіпцаў; Russian: Андрей Архипцев; born 5 July 1984) is a Belarusian former professional footballer.
