= Sergey Kontsevoy =

Belarusian footballer

Syarhey Kantsavy
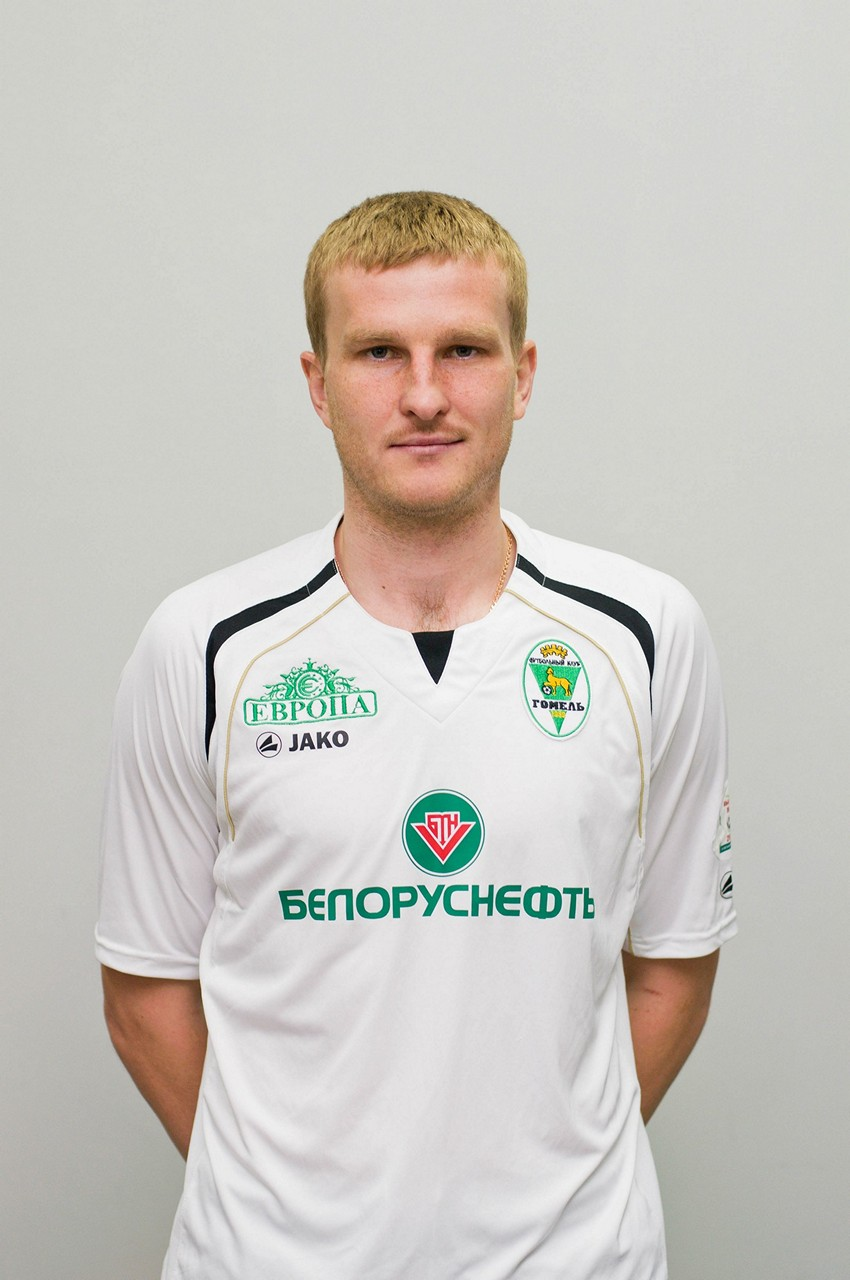

Personal information
- Date of birth: 21 June 1986 (age 40)
- Place of birth: Gomel, Belarusian SSR
- Height: 1.90 m (6 ft 3 in)
- Position: Defender

Team information
- Current team: Niva Dolbizno (assistant coach)
- Number: 26

Youth career
- 2002–2003: RUOR Minsk

Senior career*
Years	Team	Apps	(Gls)
2002–2003	RUOR Minsk	34	(4)
2004–2008	Dinamo Minsk	20	(0)
2007	→ Gomel (loan)	6	(0)
2008	→ Savit Mogilev (loan)	24	(2)
2009–2010	Torpedo Zhodino	43	(2)
2010–2011	Gomel	44	(5)
2012	Tobol Kostanay	19	(2)
2013	Gomel	14	(2)
2013–2015	Dinamo Minsk	35	(1)
2016	Belshina Bobruisk	14	(1)
2016	Dinamo Minsk	13	(0)
2017	Neftchi Fergana	8	(0)
2017	Gomel	13	(0)
2018	Torpedo-BelAZ Zhodino	18	(1)
2019–2020	Isloch Minsk Raion	52	(1)
2021	Minsk	20	(0)
2022	Naftan Novopolotsk	8	(0)
2022	Arsenal Dzerzhinsk	17	(0)
2026–	Niva Dolbizno	2	(0)

International career
2005–2007	Belarus U21	3	(0)

Managerial career
- 2023–2025: Isloch Minsk Raion (assistant)
- 2026–: Niva Dolbizno (assistant)
- * Club domestic league appearances and goals as of 1 September 2026

Syarhey Kantsavy (Belarusian: Сяргей Канцавы; Russian: Сергей Концевой; born 21 June 1986) is a Belarusian professional football coach and former player.

His older brother Artem Kontsevoy is also a former professional footballer.

== Honours ==
Dinamo Minsk

- Belarusian Premier League champion: 2004

Gomel

- Belarusian Cup winner: 2010–11
