= Pavel Platonaw =

Belarusian footballer

Personal information
- Date of birth: 7 February 1986 (age 40)
- Place of birth: Minsk, Belarusian SSR
- Height: 1.79 m (5 ft 10 in)
- Position: Midfielder

Youth career
- 2001–2004: Zvezda-BGU Minsk

Senior career*
Years	Team	Apps	(Gls)
2005	Zvezda-BGU Minsk	16	(0)
2006–2008	BATE Borisov	35	(0)
2008	→ Granit Mikashevichi (loan)	25	(0)
2009	Shakhtyor Soligorsk	1	(0)
2010–2011	Gomel	41	(6)
2012	Gorodeya	15	(1)
2013	Torpedo-BelAZ Zhodino	7	(0)

International career
2005–2007	Belarus U21	3	(0)
- * Club domestic league appearances and goals as of 8 December 2013

Pavel Platonaw (Belarusian: Павел Платонаў; Russian: Павел Платонов; born 7 February 1986 in Minsk) is a retired Belarusian footballer. His latest club was Torpedo-BelAZ Zhodino.

He is the twin brother of Dzmitry Platonaw.

== Honours ==
BATE Borisov

- Belarusian Premier League champion: 2006, 2007
- Belarusian Cup winner: 2005–06

Gomel

- Belarusian Cup winner: 2010–11
