= Ilya Aleksiyevich =

Belarusian professional football player

Personal information
- Full name: Ilya Leonidovich Aleksiyevich
- Date of birth: 10 February 1991 (age 35)
- Place of birth: Zhodino, Minsk Oblast, Belarusian SSR
- Height: 1.72 m (5 ft 7 1/2 in)
- Position: Midfielder

Team information
- Current team: Minsk
- Number: 13

Youth career
- 2007–2008: Torpedo Zhodino

Senior career*
Years	Team	Apps	(Gls)
2008–2010	Torpedo Zhodino	17	(0)
2011–2012	Gomel	56	(5)
2013–2015	BATE Borisov	59	(3)
2016	Panetolikos	3	(0)
2017	Shakhtyor Soligorsk	9	(1)
2017	→ Torpedo-BelAZ Zhodino (loan)	9	(0)
2018	Torpedo-BelAZ Zhodino	21	(0)
2019–2020	Minsk	19	(0)
2021	Krumkachy Minsk	9	(0)
2022–2023	Gomel	49	(7)
2024	BATE Borisov	22	(1)
2025	Gomel	29	(0)
2026–	Minsk	11	(0)

International career
2010–2012	Belarus U21	16	(1)
2011–2012	Belarus Olympic	7	(0)
2012–2014	Belarus	8	(1)
- * Club domestic league appearances and goals as of 6 July 2026

Ilya Leonidovich Aleksiyevich (Belarusian: Ілья Леанідавіч Алексіевіч; Russian: Илья Леонидович Алексиевич; born 10 February 1991) is a Belarusian professional football player who plays for Minsk.

== Career ==
Aleksiyevich made his debut for the senior national team of his country on 14 November 2012, in a friendly match against Israel. He had previously competed for Belarus at the 2012 Summer Olympics.

== Honours ==
Gomel

- Belarusian Cup winner: 2010–11, 2021–22
- Belarusian Super Cup winner: 2012

BATE Borisov

- Belarusian Premier League winner: 2013, 2014, 2015
- Belarusian Super Cup winner: 2013, 2014

== International goal ==
#	Date	Venue	Opponent	Score	Result	Competition
1	4 September 2014	Borisov Arena, Borisov, Belarus	Tajikistan	6 – 1	6 – 1	Friendly
