= Sergey Zabolotsky =

Belarusian footballer

Personal information
- Date of birth: 17 February 1983 (age 43)
- Place of birth: Svietlahorsk, Gomel Oblast
- Position: Forward

Youth career
- 2000–2002: Gomel

Senior career*
Years	Team	Apps	(Gls)
2000–2005	Gomel	20	(3)
2000	→ Gomel-2	5	(0)
2000	→ Khimik Svetlogorsk (loan)	4	(1)
2001	→ ZLiN Gomel (loan)	11	(2)
2003	→ Vedrich-97 Rechitsa (loan)	25	(10)
2006–2008	Khimik Svetlogorsk	76	(38)
2009–2011	DSK Gomel	79	(31)
2012	Slutsk	24	(7)
2013	Gomelzheldortrans	0	(0)
2013–2016	Zarya Starodub (amateur)		
2017–2018	Sputnik Rechitsa	32	(17)
- * Club domestic league appearances and goals as of 31 December 2018

Sergey Zabolotsky (Belarusian: Сяргей Забалоцкі; Russian: Сергей Заболоцкий; born 17 February 1983) is a retired Belarusian professional footballer.
