= Artur Lyavitski =

Belarusian footballer

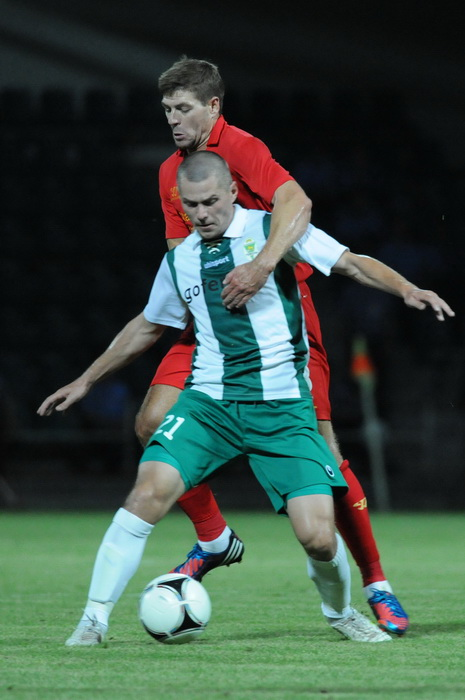

Personal information
- Date of birth: 17 March 1985 (age 41)
- Place of birth: Minsk, Belarusian SSR
- Height: 1.81 m (5 ft 11 1/2 in)
- Position: Midfielder

Youth career
- 2002–2003: RUOR Minsk

Senior career*
Years	Team	Apps	(Gls)
2002–2003	RUOR Minsk	48	(3)
2004	Dinamo-Juni Minsk	15	(2)
2005	Veras Nesvizh	23	(2)
2006	Snov	15	(4)
2006–2008	Savit Mogilev	62	(9)
2009–2010	Torpedo Zhodino	53	(10)
2011–2012	Gomel	46	(2)
2012	Minsk	9	(1)
2013–2014	Torpedo-BelAZ Zhodino	54	(4)
2016	Torpedo Mogilev	5	(1)
2018–2019	Gorki	14	(3)
2022–2023	Servolyuks Mezhisetki	24	(19)
Total		368	(60)
- * Club domestic league appearances and goals as of 31 December 2023

Artur Lyavitski (Belarusian: Артур Лявіцкі; Russian: Артур Левицкий; born 17 March 1985) is a Belarusian former professional footballer.

== Honours ==
Gomel

- Belarusian Cup winner: 2010–11
- Belarusian Super Cup winner: 2012

Minsk

- Belarusian Cup winner: 2012–13
