= Ihar Zyulew =

Belarusian footballer

Personal information
- Date of birth: 5 January 1984 (age 42)
- Height: 1.82 m (5 ft 11 1/2 in)
- Position: Forward

Team information
- Current team: Isloch Minsk Raion (assistant coach)

Senior career*
| Years | Team | Apps | (Gls) |
| 2002–2006 | Kommunalnik Slonim | 127 | (29) |
| 2007 | Smorgon | 13 | (3) |
| 2007–2009 | Shakhtyor Soligorsk | 33 | (8) |
| 2009–2016 | Naftan Novopolotsk | 197 | (13) |
| 2017–2018 | Isloch Minsk Raion | 44 | (1) |

Managerial career
- 2018–: Isloch Minsk Raion (assistant)
- * Club domestic league appearances and goals as of 31 December 2018

Ihar Zyulew (Belarusian: Ігар Зюлеў; Russian: Игорь Зюлев; born 5 January 1984) is a Belarusian professional football coach and former player.

== Honours ==
Naftan Novopolotsk

- Belarusian Cup winner: 2011–12
