= Alyaksey Martynets =

Belarusian footballer

Personal information
- Date of birth: 13 March 1985 (age 41)
- Place of birth: Minsk, Byelorussian SSR, Soviet Union
- Height: 1.82 m (5 ft 11 1/2 in)
- Position: Midfielder

Youth career
- 2003–2005: Smena Minsk

Senior career*
Years	Team	Apps	(Gls)
2003–2005	Smena Minsk	76	(11)
2006–2008	Minsk	45	(7)
2009	Smorgon	13	(2)
2010	Torpedo Zhodino	23	(0)
2011	Granit Mikashevichi	28	(1)
2012–2017	Gorodeya	123	(3)
2017	Granit Mikashevichi	14	(1)
- * Club domestic league appearances and goals as of 31 December 2017

Alyaksey Martynets (Belarusian: Аляксей Мартынец; Russian: Алексей Мартынец; born 13 March 1985) is a Belarusian former professional footballer.

== Career ==
Born in Minsk, Martynets began playing football in FC Smena Minsk's youth system. After the club was incorporated into FC Minsk, he joined the senior team and made his Belarusian Premier League debut in 2007.
