= Uladzimir Bushma =

Belarusian professional footballer

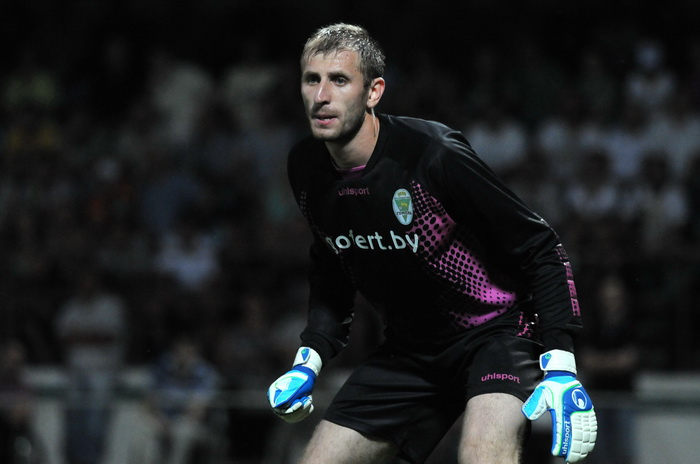

Personal information
- Date of birth: 24 November 1983 (age 42)
- Place of birth: Minsk, Belarusian SSR
- Height: 1.90 m (6 ft 3 in)
- Position: Goalkeeper

Team information
- Current team: Krumkachy Minsk (manager)

Senior career*
Years	Team	Apps	(Gls)
2001	SKAF Minsk	23	(0)
2002–2010	Torpedo Zhodino	88	(0)
2011–2012	Gomel	53	(0)
2013–2014	Minsk	52	(0)
2015–2017	Shakhtyor Soligorsk	62	(0)
2018–2022	Torpedo-BelAZ Zhodino	89	(0)
2022	Maxline Rogachev	2	(0)
2023–	Krumkachy Minsk	28	(0)

Managerial career
- 2025–: Krumkachy Minsk
- * Club domestic league appearances and goals as of 2 April 2026

Uladzimir Bushma (Belarusian: Уладзімір Бушма; Russian: Владимир Бушма; born 24 November 1983) is a Belarusian professional footballer.

== Honours ==
Gomel

- Belarusian Cup: 2010–11
- Belarusian Super Cup: 2012

Minsk

- Belarusian Cup: 2012–13
