= Alyaksey Tsimashenka =

Belarusian footballer

Personal information
- Date of birth: 9 December 1986 (age 39)
- Place of birth: Gomel, Belarusian SSR
- Height: 1.74 m (5 ft 8 1/2 in)
- Position: Midfielder

Youth career
- 2004–2005: Gomel

Senior career*
Years	Team	Apps	(Gls)
2004–2005	Gomel	3	(0)
2006–2008	Vedrich-97 Rechitsa	58	(13)
2008–2012	Gomel	64	(8)
2012	→ Belshina Bobruisk (loan)	8	(0)
2013	Slavia Mozyr	32	(1)
2014	Belshina Bobruisk	29	(0)
2015	Granit Mikashevichi	26	(1)
2016	Shakhtyor Soligorsk	10	(0)
2017	Vitebsk	21	(1)
2018–2019	Slutsk	40	(0)
2020	Sputnik Rechitsa	18	(0)
2021–2022	Lokomotiv Gomel	36	(1)
- * Club domestic league appearances and goals as of 31 December 2022

Alyaksey Tsimashenka (Belarusian: Аляксей Цімашэнка; Russian: Алексей Тимошенко; born 9 December 1986) is a Belarusian professional footballer.

== Honours ==
Gomel

- Belarusian Cup winner: 2010–11
- Belarusian Super Cup winner: 2012
