= Yuri Markhel =

Belarusian footballer

Personal information
- Date of birth: 9 January 1979 (age 47)
- Place of birth: Minsk, Belarusian SSR, Soviet Union
- Height: 1.79 m (5 ft 10 1/2 in)
- Position: Forward

Youth career
- 1997–1999: AFViS-RShVSM Minsk

Senior career*
Years	Team	Apps	(Gls)
1997–1999	AFViS-RShVSM Minsk	25	(7)
2000	Zvezda-VA-BGU Minsk	29	(6)
2001	Alania Vladikavkaz	2	(0)
2002–2003	Torpedo Zhodino	55	(33)
2004	Metalurh Zaporizhzhia	11	(0)
2004	→ Metalurh-2 Zaporizhzhia	1	(0)
2005	Gomel	23	(1)
2006–2008	Lokomotiv Minsk	74	(23)
2009	Kyzylzhar	7	(0)
2009–2010	SKVICH Minsk	41	(39)
2011	Naftan Novopolotsk	5	(0)
2011–2012	SKVICH Minsk	41	(41)
2013	Gorodeya	27	(10)
2014	Smorgon	28	(4)
2015	Zvezda-BGU Minsk	17	(2)
- * Club domestic league appearances and goals

Yuri Markhel (Belarusian: Юрый Мархель; Russian: Юрий Мархель; born 9 January 1979) is a former Belarusian footballer.

== Career ==
Yuri Markhel was a prolific goalscorer in the Belarusian First League. In May 2013, he scored his 100th First League goal. After retiring in 2015, he began working as a youth coach.

He is the younger brother of Mikhail Markhel. In June 2019, Mikhail was appointed manager of the Belarus national team and Yuri joined his coaching staff.
