= Alyaksandr Tsyarentsyew =

Belarusian footballer

Personal information
- Date of birth: 4 September 1981 (age 45)
- Place of birth: Minsk, Belarusian SSR
- Height: 1.77 m (5 ft 9 1/2 in)
- Position: Midfielder

Youth career
- 1999–2000: Smena Minsk

Senior career*
Years	Team	Apps	(Gls)
1999	Smena-BATE Minsk	9	(0)
2000	RShVSM-Olympia Minsk	18	(0)
2000–2001	BATE Borisov	25	(0)
2002–2005	Darida Minsk Raion	82	(14)
2005	Belshina Bobruisk	11	(0)
2006	Mozyr-ZLiN	23	(2)
2007–2009	Torpedo Zhodino	49	(4)
2010–2011	Gorodeya	40	(8)

International career
2001	Belarus U21	4	(0)
- * Club domestic league appearances and goals

Alyaksandr Tsyarentsyew (Belarusian: Аляксандр Цярэнцьеў; Russian: Александр Терентьев; born 4 September 1981) is a retired Belarusian professional footballer.

== Career ==
Born in Minsk, Tsyarentsyew began playing football in FC BATE Borisov's youth system. He joined the senior team and made his Belarusian Premier League debut in 2000.
