= Dzyanis Zhukaw =

Belarusian footballer

Personal information
- Date of birth: 27 October 1987 (age 39)
- Position: Midfielder

Youth career
- 2004–2006: Lokomotiv Vitebsk

Senior career*
Years	Team	Apps	(Gls)
2005–2009	Vitebsk	29	(0)
2009–2011	Polotsk	62	(5)
- * Club domestic league appearances and goals

Dzyanis Zhukaw (Belarusian: Дзяніс Жукаў; Russian: Денис Жуков; born 27 October 1987) is a retired Belarusian professional footballer.
