= Artem Kontsevoy (footballer, born 1983) =

Belarusian footballer

Personal information
- Full name: Artem Vladimirovich Kontsevoy
- Date of birth: 20 May 1983 (age 43)
- Place of birth: Gomel, Belarusian SSR, Soviet Union
- Height: 1.77 m (5 ft 9 1/2 in)
- Position: Forward

Youth career
- 1999–2000: RUOR Minsk

Senior career*
| Years | Team | Apps | (Gls) |
| 1999–2000 | RUOR Minsk | 32 | (8) |
| 2001–2002 | BATE Borisov | 46 | (15) |
| 2003–2004 | Spartak Moscow | 11 | (2) |
| 2004 | → Chernomorets Novorossiysk (loan) | 21 | (4) |
| 2005–2008 | MTZ-RIPO Minsk | 88 | (42) |
| 2009–2010 | Spartak Nalchik | 18 | (2) |
| 2010 | → BATE Borisov (loan) | 11 | (2) |
| 2011–2013 | BATE Borisov | 63 | (13) |
| 2014–2015 | Torpedo-BelAZ Zhodino | 39 | (3) |
| 2015–2019 | Neman Grodno | 71 | (5) |

International career
| 1999 | Belarus U17 | 4 | (0) |
| 2001 | Belarus U19 | 2 | (0) |
| 2002–2005 | Belarus U21 | 34 | (7) |
| 2006–2008 | Belarus | 10 | (0) |

Managerial career
- 2024–2025: BATE-2 Borisov
- 2025–2026: BATE Borisov
- * Club domestic league appearances and goals

Artem Vladimirovich Kontsevoy (Russian: Артём Концевой; Belarusian: Арцём Канцавы, romanized: Artsyom Uladzimiravich Kantsavy; born 20 May 1983) is a football coach and former player (forward) from Belarus. He was a member of the Belarus national team. His younger brother Sergey Kontsevoy is also a professional footballer.

== Honors and awards ==
BATE Borisov

- Belarusian Premier League champion: 2002, 2010, 2011, 2012, 2013
- Belarusian Cup winner: 2009–10
- Belarusian Super Cup winner: 2010, 2013

Spartak Moscow

- Russian Cup winner: 2002–03

MTZ-RIPO Minsk

- Belarusian Cup winner: 2004–05, 2007–08
