= Andrey Dashuk =

Belarusian footballer (born 1987)

Personal information
- Date of birth: 14 August 1987 (age 39)
- Place of birth: Gomel, Belarusian SSR
- Height: 1.82 m (5 ft 11 1/2 in)
- Position: Forward

Team information
- Current team: Sbornaya TF

Youth career
- 2004–2006: Gomel

Senior career*
Years	Team	Apps	(Gls)
2006–2009	Gomel	34	(3)
2010	Khimik Svetlogorsk	30	(9)
2011	DSK Gomel	29	(6)
2012	Slutsk	8	(0)
2012–2016	Khimik Svetlogorsk	80	(12)
2017	Sbornaya TF	2	(1)
- * Club domestic league appearances and goals as of 31 December 2017

Andrey Dashuk (Belarusian: Андрэй Дашук; Russian: Андрей Дашук; born 14 August 1987) is a Belarusian former professional footballer.
