= Syarhey Kazeka =

Belarusian footballer

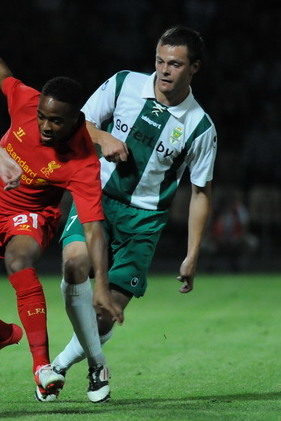
- Syarhey Kazeka (2012)

Personal information
- Date of birth: 17 August 1986 (age 40)
- Place of birth: Baranovichi, Brest Oblast, Byelorussian SSR, Soviet Union
- Height: 1.82 m (6 ft 0 in)
- Position: Midfielder

Senior career*
Years	Team	Apps	(Gls)
2002–2009	Baranovichi	126	(19)
2010–2012	Gomel	89	(16)
2013	Minsk	30	(2)
2014	Torpedo-BelAZ Zhodino	29	(2)
2015	Shakhtyor Soligorsk	10	(0)
2016–2017	Spartaks Jūrmala	29	(1)
2018–2019	Uzda	44	(12)
2020	Krumkachy Minsk	13	(2)
2023–2024	Krumkachy Minsk	5	(1)

Managerial career
- 2021: Krumkachy Minsk (caretaker)
- 2022–2024: Krumkachy Minsk
- * Club domestic league appearances and goals

Syarhey Kazeka (Belarusian: Сяргей Казека; Russian: Серге́й Козека; born 17 August 1986) is a Belarusian football coach and former player.

== Honours ==
Gomel

- Belarusian Cup winner: 2010–11
- Belarusian Super Cup winner: 2012

Minsk

- Belarusian Cup winner: 2012–13

Spartaks Jūrmala

- Latvian Higher League champion: 2016, 2017
