= Pavel Yawseenka =

Belarusian footballer and coach

Personal information
- Date of birth: 30 October 1980 (age 46)
- Place of birth: Minsk, Belarusian SSR
- Height: 1.82 m (5 ft 11 1/2 in)
- Position: Defender

Team information
- Current team: Niva Dolbizno (manager)

Youth career
- 1998–1999: AFViS-RShVSM Minsk

Senior career*
Years	Team	Apps	(Gls)
1998	AFViS-RShVSM Minsk	2	(0)
1999	Molodechno	24	(3)
2000	RShVSM-Olympia Minsk	21	(3)
2001–2003	Kommunalnik Slonim	64	(11)
2004	Granit Mikashevichi	30	(11)
2005	Khimik Svetlogorsk	27	(4)
2006–2007	Minsk	26	(6)
2008	Savit Mogilev	5	(0)
2008–2009	Torpedo Zhodino	34	(1)
2010–2012	Gomel	66	(1)
2013	Slavia-Mozyr	22	(1)
2014–2016	Granit Mikashevichi	58	(3)
2016	Torpedo Minsk	13	(0)

Managerial career
- 2017: Shakhtyor Soligorsk (assistant)
- 2017–2018: Torpedo-BelAZ Zhodino (assistant)
- 2019–2020: Jelgava (assistant)
- 2022–2024: Belarus (assistant)
- 2024: ABFF U-17
- 2025: Belarus U-17
- 2025: Torpedo-BelAZ Zhodino (assistant)
- 2026–: Niva Dolbizno
- * Club domestic league appearances and goals

Pavel Yawseenka (Belarusian: Павел Яўсеенка; Russian: Павел Евсеенко; born 30 October 1980) is a Belarusian football coach and former player. As of 2026, he works as manager at Niva Dolbizno.

== Honours ==
Gomel

- Belarusian Cup winner: 2010–11
- Belarusian Super Cup winner: 2012
