= Pavel Baskakov =

Belarusian professional footballer

Personal information
- Date of birth: 28 November 1991 (age 34)
- Place of birth: Minsk, Belarusian SSR
- Height: 1.72 m (5 ft 8 in)
- Position: Midfielder

Youth career
- 2008–2009: BATE Borisov

Senior career*
Years	Team	Apps	(Gls)
2008–2011	BATE Borisov	0	(0)
2010	→ Kommunalnik Slonim (loan)	25	(1)
2011	→ Vitebsk (loan)	5	(0)
2011	→ Kommunalnik Slonim (loan)	13	(1)
2012–2014	Smorgon	63	(6)
2015	Granit Mikashevichi	5	(0)
2016	Luch Minsk	19	(3)
2017	Uzda	5	(0)
2018–2019	NFK Minsk	45	(11)
2020	Volna Pinsk	11	(1)
2021	Kronon Stolbtsy	5	(1)
- * Club domestic league appearances and goals as of 31 December 2021

Pavel Baskakov (Belarusian: Павел Баскакаў; Russian: Павел Баскаков; born 28 November 1991) is a Belarusian former professional footballer.
