= Artur Bombel =

Belarusian footballer

Personal information
- Full name: Artur Bombel
- Date of birth: 14 December 1992 (age 33)
- Place of birth: Grodno, Belarus
- Height: 1.81 m (5 ft 11 in)
- Position: Forward

Youth career
- 2007–2011: Neman Grodno

Senior career*
Years	Team	Apps	(Gls)
2011–2017	Neman Grodno	82	(6)
2014	→ Lida (loan)	14	(2)
2018	Lida	16	(2)

International career
2008–2009	Belarus U19	11	(1)
2012–2013	Belarus U21	9	(1)
- * Club domestic league appearances and goals as of 31 December 2018

Artur Bombel (born 14 December 1992) is a Belarusian professional football player most recently playing for Lida.

== Career ==
Bombel was born in Grodno, at the age of nineteen he began playing professional football with local club FC Neman Grodno in 2010, he didn't make a single appearance in his first season at the club, in the 2011 season Bombel made his debut against Dnepr Mogilev and the match was drawn 1-1 he played twenty-six minutes in the match. Bombel finished the 2011 season with two appearances in total, in the 2012 season Bombel appeared in four league and 3 cup matches for FC Neman Grodno. During the current season Bombel has made four appearances for the club, taking his total appearances to 10 league and 3 cup appearances.

On 16 January 2020, the BFF banned Bombel for 12 months for his involvement in the match fixing.

== International ==
Bombel has been capped at youth levels up to Belarus U21 level.
