= Dmytro Tereshchenko =

Ukrainian footballer

Personal information
- Full name: Dmytro Yuriiovych Tereshchenko
- Date of birth: 4 April 1987 (age 39)
- Place of birth: Pavlohrad, Dnipropetrovsk Oblast, Ukrainian SSR
- Height: 1.80 m (5 ft 11 in)
- Position: Midfielder

Youth career
- 1999–2003: Dnipro Dnipropetrovsk
- 2004–2006: Dnepr Mogilev

Senior career*
Years	Team	Apps	(Gls)
2007–2011	Dnepr Mogilev	126	(8)
2012–2013	Dinamo Minsk	6	(0)
2012	→ Dnepr Mogilev (loan)	11	(3)
2013	→ Belshina Bobruisk (loan)	25	(1)
2014–2017	Dnepr Mogilev	107	(4)
2018–2020	Gomel	68	(0)
2021–2023	Dnepr Mogilev	70	(0)
- * Club domestic league appearances and goals as of 31 December 2023

Dmytro Yuriiovych Tereshchenko (Ukrainian: Дмитро Юрійович Терещенко; born 4 April 1987) is a Ukrainian former professional footballer. He spent his entire senior career in Belarus, after relocating there in 2004.
