= Mikalay Fastaw =

Belarusian footballer

Personal information
- Date of birth: 29 May 1990 (age 36)
- Height: 1.83 m (6 ft 0 in)
- Position: Midfielder

Youth career
- 2007–2008: Smorgon

Senior career*
Years	Team	Apps	(Gls)
2008–2009	Neman Grodno	1	(0)
2009–2011	Smorgon	53	(7)
2012	Dnepr Mogilev	8	(1)
2012	Lida	8	(0)
2013–2014	Volna Pinsk	35	(2)
- * Club domestic league appearances and goals as of 1 December 2014

Mikalay Fastaw (Belarusian: Мікалай Фастаў; Russian: Николай Фастов; born 29 May 1990) is a Belarusian former professional footballer.
