= Simon Ogar Veron =

Nigerian footballer

Simon Ogar
Personal information
- Full name: Simon Ogar Veron
- Date of birth: 24 April 1987 (age 39)
- Place of birth: Asaba, Delta State, Nigeria
- Height: 1.71 m (5 ft 7 1/2 in)
- Position: Midfielder

Youth career
- Christ Ambassador Spots Academy

Senior career*
Years	Team	Apps	(Gls)
2004	Sandnessjøen		
2005	Stålkameratene		
2006–2007	Christ Ambassador FC		
2008–2009	Vitebsk	39	(0)
2010–2011	Torpedo-BelAZ Zhodino	37	(0)
2012–2013	Dinamo Brest	55	(0)
2014	Naftan Novopolotsk	8	(0)
2016	Dinamo Brest	12	(0)
2017–2019	Lida	67	(1)
2019	Smorgon	13	(0)

International career
- Nigeria U20
- * Club domestic league appearances and goals as of 31 December 2019

Simon Ogar Veron or simply Ogar (born 24 April 1987) is a Nigerian former professional footballer.

== Career ==
=== Club ===
While playing for the Nigerian youth national team at a friendly tournament in Sweden in 2004, Ogar left the team and illegally moved to Norway, seeking asylum there. During 2004 and 2005 he played for low level Norwegian clubs Sandnessjøen and Stålkameratene, while living at a refugee camp. In late 2005, he was at a trial at the top level club Bodø/Glimt. The club was interested in signing the player, but due to complications in paperwork related to Ogar's requested permanent residency in Norway, the deal was off and the player had to return to Nigeria.

In 2008, Ogar moved to Belarus, where he has been living and playing ever since.

On 6 August 2020, the BFF banned Ogar from Belarusian football for two years for his involvement in match fixing.

=== International ===
Ogar was during his time in Norway, a member of the Nigeria national under-20 football team.
