= Dmitry Kharitonchik =

Belarusian footballer

Personal information
- Date of birth: 11 June 1986 (age 40)
- Place of birth: Mozyr, Belarusian SSR
- Height: 1.78 m (5 ft 10 in)
- Position: Midfielder

Youth career
- 2002–2003: Slavia Mozyr

Senior career*
Years	Team	Apps	(Gls)
2003–2004	Slavia Mozyr	5	(0)
2005–2009	MTZ-RIPO Minsk	4	(1)
2006	→ FBK Kaunas (loan)	1	(0)
2007	→ Belshina Bobruisk (loan)	24	(1)
2008	→ Slavia Mozyr (loan)	25	(2)
2010	Slavia Mozyr	28	(9)
2011	Gorodeya	20	(4)
2012–2013	Khimik Svetlogorsk	50	(11)
2014–2015	Slavia Mozyr	30	(1)
2016	Montazhnik Mozyr	5	(0)
2021–2023	MNPZ Mozyr	50	(6)
- * Club domestic league appearances and goals as of 31 December 2023

Dmitry Kharitonchik (Belarusian: Дзмітры Харытончык; Russian: Дмитрий Харитончик; born 11 June 1986) is a Belarusian former professional footballer.

== Honours ==
FBK Kaunas

- A Lyga champion: 2006
