= Vadzim Dzemidovich =

Belarusian footballer

Personal information
- Full name: Vadzim Uladzimiravich Dzemidovich
- Date of birth: 20 September 1985 (age 41)
- Place of birth: Brest, Belarusian SSR
- Height: 1.83 m (6 ft 0 in)
- Position: Forward

Youth career
- 2003–2005: Dinamo Brest

Senior career*
Years	Team	Apps	(Gls)
2004–2009	Dinamo Brest	62	(4)
2010–2011	Neman Grodno	60	(10)
2012	Gomel	13	(2)
2012	Torpedo-BelAZ Zhodino	5	(0)
2013	Belshina Bobruisk	22	(6)
2014–2015	Naftan Novopolotsk	44	(13)
2015–2016	Torpedo-BelAZ Zhodino	41	(17)
2017	Dinamo Minsk	7	(0)
2017	Minsk	8	(0)
2018	Torpedo Minsk	11	(2)
2018	Dnepr Mogilev	11	(0)
2019	Rukh Brest	27	(12)
2021	Brestzhilstroy	12	(8)
- * Club domestic league appearances and goals as of 31 December 2021

Vadzim Uladzimiravich Dzemidovich (Belarusian: Вадзім Уладзіміравіч Дземідовіч; Russian: Вадим Демидович (Vadim Demidovich); born 20 September 1985) is a Belarusian former footballer.

His brother Alyaksandr Dzemidovich is also a professional footballer.

== Honours ==
Dinamo Brest

- Belarusian Cup winner: 2006–07

Gomel

- Belarusian Super Cup winner: 2012

Torpedo-BelAZ Zhodino

- Belarusian Cup winner: 2015–16
