= Yauheni Savastsyanau =

Belarusian footballer (born 1988)

Personal information
- Date of birth: 30 January 1988 (age 38)
- Place of birth: Grodno, Byelorussian SSR, Soviet Union
- Height: 1.87 m (6 ft 1 1/2 in)
- Position: Midfielder

Team information
- Current team: Kluczevia Stargard II
- Number: 33

Youth career
- 2005–2007: Neman Grodno

Senior career*
Years	Team	Apps	(Gls)
2007–2013	Neman Grodno	150	(5)
2014–2015	Gomel	32	(1)
2015–2018	Neman Grodno	66	(1)
2019	Slutsk	12	(1)
2019	Dnyapro Mogilev	6	(0)
2020–2021	Smorgon	47	(6)
2022–2024	Kluczevia Stargard	80	(7)
2024–	Kluczevia Stargard II	23	(5)

International career
2009–2011	Belarus U21	8	(0)
2011	Belarus Olympic	1	(0)
- * Club domestic league appearances and goals as of 20:58, 27 June 2026 (UTC)

Yauheni Savastsyanau (Belarusian: Яўгеній Савасцьянаў; Russian: Евгений Савостьянов; born 30 January 1988) is a Belarusian professional footballer who plays as a midfielder for Polish Klasa A club Kluczevia Stargard II.

== Honours ==
Kluczevia Stargard

- IV liga West Pomerania: 2024–25

Kluczevia Stargard II

- Klasa A West Pomerania V: 2025–26
