= Ivan Bionchik =

Belarusian footballer and coach

Personal information
- Full name: Ivan Sergeevich Bionchik
- Date of birth: 7 October 1985 (age 41)
- Place of birth: Minsk, Belarusian SSR
- Position: Defender

Team information
- Current team: Slavia Mozyr (manager)

Youth career
- 2000–2001: Torpedo-MAZ Minsk

Senior career*
Years	Team	Apps	(Gls)
2002–2010	SKVICH Minsk	113	(5)
2002	→ SKVICH-2 Minsk	20	(1)
2005	→ Kommunalnik Slonim (loan)	14	(2)
2006	→ Molodechno (loan)	16	(3)

Managerial career
- 2011–2012: SKVICH Minsk (assistant)
- 2013–2014: Luch Minsk (assistant)
- 2014–2019: Luch Minsk
- 2019: Dnyapro Mogilev
- 2019–2021: Gomel
- 2021–2022: Shakhtyor Soligorsk
- 2022–: Slavia Mozyr
- * Club domestic league appearances and goals

Ivan Bionchik (Belarusian: Іван Біёнчык; Russian: Иван Биончик; born 7 October 1985) is a Belarusian professional football coach and a former player.

== Career ==
In 2017, he led his club Luch Minsk to Belarusian First League title and promotion to Premier League.
