= Nikolay Zagvozdin =

Belarusian footballer

Personal information
- Date of birth: 31 August 1991 (age 35)
- Place of birth: Kalinkovichi, Gomel Oblast, Belarusian SSR
- Height: 1.76 m (5 ft 9 in)
- Position: Midfielder

Team information
- Current team: MNPZ Mozyr

Youth career
- 2005–2009: Dinamo Minsk

Senior career*
| Years | Team | Apps | (Gls) |
| 2010–2012 | Dinamo Minsk | 0 | (0) |
| 2010–2011 | → Bereza-2010 (loan) | 45 | (2) |
| 2011 | → Khimik Svetlogorsk (loan) | 12 | (1) |
| 2012 | → Dinamo-2 Minsk | 33 | (9) |
| 2013 | Gorodeya | 8 | (1) |
| 2014–2016 | Gomelzheldortrans | 61 | (7) |
| 2016 | Granit Mikashevichi | 14 | (1) |
| 2017 | Lida | 14 | (1) |
| 2017–2019 | Lokomotiv Gomel | 54 | (7) |
| 2019–2020 | Sputnik Rechitsa | 34 | (8) |
| 2021 | Shakhtyor Petrikov | 28 | (3) |
| 2022 | Lokomotiv Gomel | 16 | (1) |
| 2023– | MNPZ Mozyr | 25 | (18) |
- * Club domestic league appearances and goals as of 31 December 2023

Nikolay Zagvozdin (Belarusian: Мікалай Загвоздзін; Russian: Николай Загвоздин; born 31 August 1991) is a Belarusian professional footballer who plays for MNPZ Mozyr.
