= Maksym Lisovyi =

Ukrainian footballer (born 1985)

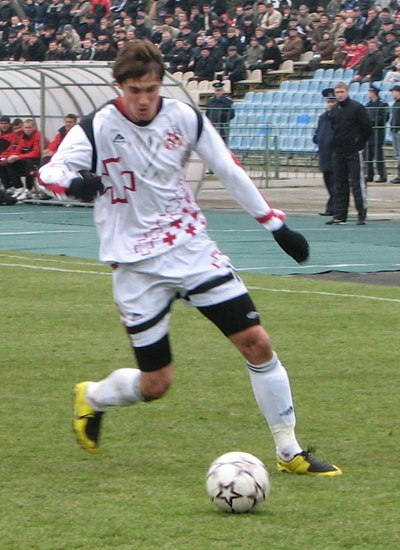

Personal information
- Full name: Maksym Oleksiyovych Lisovyi
- Date of birth: 21 May 1985 (age 41)
- Place of birth: Cherkasy, Ukrainian SSR
- Height: 1.94 m (6 ft 4 1/2 in)
- Position: Midfielder

Youth career
- 2000–2002: Cherkasy

Senior career*
Years	Team	Apps	(Gls)
2002–2003	Cherkasy	7	(0)
2004–2006	Borysfen Boryspil	26	(2)
2004	→ Borysfen-2 Boryspil	1	(0)
2006	Zorya Luhansk	0	(0)
2007–2010	Volyn Lutsk	84	(12)
2010–2011	Sevastopol	2	(0)
2011	→ Belshina Bobruisk (loan)	15	(5)
2011	Gomel	15	(5)
2012	Dinamo Minsk	11	(0)
2013	Dnepr Mogilev	20	(0)
2014	Poltava	21	(2)
2015–2016	Cherkaskyi Dnipro	14	(0)
2016	Poltava	20	(4)
2017	Kremin Kremenchuk	11	(1)
2017	Sumy	8	(0)
2017–2018	Yednist Plysky (amateur)		
2018	FC KLF Poltava (amateur)		
2019	FC Budivelnyk Lysychansk (amateur)		
- * Club domestic league appearances and goals as of 31 December 2017

Maksym Oleksiyovych Lisovyi (Ukrainian: Максим Олексійович Лісовий; born 21 May 1985) is a Ukrainian former professional football midfielder.

== Career ==
Maksym Lisovyi spent his career as a player in several clubs of the Ukrainian First League and the Ukrainian Second League. In his later years, when he played for PFC Sevastopol, he was loaned from February 2011 to Belarusian club FC Belshina
