= Raman Astapenka =

Belarusian footballer

Personal information
- Date of birth: 10 March 1980 (age 46)
- Height: 1.93 m (6 ft 4 in)
- Position: Goalkeeper

Youth career
- RUOR Minsk

Senior career*
Years	Team	Apps	(Gls)
1998	RUOR Minsk	12	(0)
1998	Gomel-2	6	(0)
1999–2004	Zvezda-BGU Minsk	102	(0)
2004–2006	Dinamo Brest	12	(0)
2006	Neman Grodno	3	(0)
2007–2008	Darida Minsk Raion	21	(0)
2008–2011	Neman Grodno	53	(0)
- * Club domestic league appearances and goals as of 27 December 2011

Raman Astapenka (Belarusian: Раман Астапенка; Russian: Роман Астапенко; born 10 March 1980) is a Belarusian retired association football goalkeeper who last played for Neman Grodno until 2011.
