= Valeri Tsyganenko =

Belarusian footballer and coach

Personal information
- Date of birth: 21 July 1981 (age 45)
- Place of birth: Minsk, Belarusian SSR
- Height: 1.97 m (6 ft 5 1/2 in)
- Position: Midfielder

Team information
- Current team: Isloch Minsk Raion (coach)

Youth career
- Ataka Minsk

Senior career*
Years	Team	Apps	(Gls)
- RShVSM-Olympia Minsk
- Traktor Minsk
2002–2003	Kommunalnik Slonim	56	(8)
2004	ZLiN Gomel	21	(2)
2005	TP-47	8	(0)
2006	Kommunalnik Slonim	7	(1)
2006	Snov	12	(3)
2007	Šiauliai	29	(1)
2008	Lida	12	(0)
2008	BGATU-Niva Samokhvalovichi	11	(2)
2009	SKVICH Minsk	12	(0)
2009	Ararat Yerevan	11	(1)
2010	Abdysh-Ata Kant	20	(14)
2011	Khujand		
2012	Vedrich-97 Rechitsa	25	(3)
2013–2017	Isloch Minsk Raion	88	(5)

Managerial career
- 2016–: Isloch Minsk Raion (youth)
- * Club domestic league appearances and goals as of 31 December 2017

Valeri Tsyganenko (Belarusian: Валеры Цыганенка; Russian: Валерий Цыганенко; born 21 July 1981) is a Belarusian professional football coach and former player. Currently, he works at Isloch Minsk Raion as a youth coach.
