= Syarhey Lyavitski =

Belarusian footballer

Personal information
- Date of birth: 27 May 1990 (age 36)
- Place of birth: Grodno, Byelorussian SSR, Soviet Union
- Height: 1.77 m (5 ft 9 1/2 in)
- Position: Midfielder

Youth career
- 2007–2008: Neman Grodno

Senior career*
Years	Team	Apps	(Gls)
2008–2014	Neman Grodno	123	(6)
2015–2016	Slutsk	29	(3)
2017–2018	Lida	54	(7)
2019	Smolevichi	23	(2)

International career
2010–2012	Belarus U21	10	(0)
- * Club domestic league appearances and goals as of 31 December 2019

Syarhey Vyachaslavavich Lyavitski (Belarusian: Сяргей Вячаслававіч Лявіцкі; Russian: Сергей Вячеславович Левицкий; born 27 May 1990) is a Belarusian former professional footballer.

== Career ==
Born in Grodno, Lyavitski began playing football in FC Neman Grodno's youth system. He made joined the senior team where he made his Belarusian Premier League debut in 2008.

On 16 January 2020, the BFF banned Lyavitski for 12 months for his involvement in the match fixing.
