= Andrey Horbach =

Belarusian footballer

Personal information
- Date of birth: 20 May 1985 (age 41)
- Place of birth: Masty, Grodno Oblast, Belarusian SSR
- Height: 1.85 m (6 ft 1 in)
- Position: Defender

Senior career*
Years	Team	Apps	(Gls)
2001–2002	Neman Mosty	37	(3)
2003–2005	BATE Borisov	3	(0)
2005–2011	Neman Grodno	116	(9)
2012–2013	Dnepr Mogilev	50	(2)
2014	Slutsk	19	(1)
2015–2019	Neman Grodno	76	(2)
2021	ZhKKh Grodno	8	(5)
- * Club domestic league appearances and goals as of 31 December 2021

Andrey Horbach (Belarusian: Андрэй Горбач; Russian: Андрей Горбач; born 20 May 1985) is a Belarusian former professional footballer
