= Yury Vasyutsin =

Belarusian footballer

Personal information
- Date of birth: 20 July 1978 (age 48)
- Place of birth: Orsha
- Height: 1.81 m (5 ft 11 1/2 in)
- Position: Goalkeeper

Team information
- Current team: Orsha (goalkeeper coach)

Senior career*
Years	Team	Apps	(Gls)
1997–2014	Vitebsk	245	(0)
1998–1999	→ Lokomotiv Vitebsk	22	(0)

Managerial career
- 2015–: Orsha (goalkeeper coach)
- * Club domestic league appearances and goals as of 2 December 2014

Yury Vasyutsin (Belarusian: Юрый Васюцін; Russian: Юрий Васютин; born 20 July 1978) is a retired Belarusian professional footballer. He spent his almost entire career at FC Vitebsk, excluding a short spell in a then-farm club Lokomotiv Vitebsk.

In July 2010, Vasyutsin came in as a substitute outfield player in a cup game against Khimik Svetlogorsk and scored a winning goal in extra time.
