= Anton Brusnikin =

Russian footballer

Personal information
- Full name: Anton Andreyevich Brusnikin
- Date of birth: 13 January 1986 (age 40)
- Height: 1.68 m (5 ft 6 in)
- Position: Midfielder

Youth career
- DYuSSh Smena-Zenit

Senior career*
| Years | Team | Apps | (Gls) |
| 2003–2005 | Zenit Saint Petersburg | 0 | (0) |
| 2005 | Petrotrest Saint Petersburg | 19 | (4) |
| 2006 | Khimki | 0 | (0) |
| 2006 | Petrotrest Saint Petersburg | 19 | (5) |
| 2007 | Tekstilshchik-Telekom Ivanovo | 21 | (0) |
| 2008 | Karelia Petrozavodsk (amateur) | | |
| 2008 | Torpedo Saint Petersburg | | |
| 2008 | Trevis and VVK Saint Petersburg (amateur) | | |
| 2009–2010 | Torpedo Zhodino | 51 | (4) |
| 2011–2018 | Zvezda Saint Petersburg (amateur) | | |
- * Club domestic league appearances and goals

Anton Andreyevich Brusnikin (Russian: Антон Андреевич Брусникин; born 13 January 1986) is a former Russian professional footballer.

== Career ==
Brusnikin began playing professional football with Russian Football National League side FC Petrotrest St. Petersburg, but left the club for FC Khimki in 2006. He later played in the FNL in 2007 for FC Tekstilshchik Ivanovo.
