= Sergey Korsak =

Belarusian footballer

Personal information
- Date of birth: 24 February 1989 (age 37)
- Place of birth: Molodechno, Belarusian SSR
- Height: 1.79 m (5 ft 10 1/2 in)
- Position: Midfielder

Youth career
- 2004–2006: Dinamo Minsk

Senior career*
Years	Team	Apps	(Gls)
2007–2009	Molodechno	49	(14)
2010–2011	Partizan Minsk	43	(4)
2012	Smorgon	24	(0)
2013	Naftan Novopolotsk	11	(0)
2013	→ Slutsk (loan)	15	(2)
2014	Gorodeya	0	(0)
2014–2015	Belita-Viteks Uzda	37	(30)
2015–2017	Krumkachy Minsk	35	(7)
2017	Torpedo Minsk	10	(1)
2018	Lida	28	(4)
2019	NFK Minsk	10	(3)
2019–2020	Molodechno	19	(16)
2020	Dnepr Rogachev	1	(0)
- * Club domestic league appearances and goals as of 31 December 2020

Sergey Korsak (Belarusian: Сяргей Корсак; Russian: Серге́й Корсак; born 24 February 1989) is a Belarusian former footballer.

On 6 August 2020, the BFF banned Korsak from Belarusian football for 2 years for his involvement in the match fixing.
