= Yury Aleshchanka =

Belarusian footballer

Personal information
- Date of birth: 6 September 1984 (age 42)
- Position: Forward

Senior career*
Years	Team	Apps	(Gls)
2002–2003	Lokomotiv Vitebsk	22	(2)
2004–2005	Orsha	50	(26)
2006	Polotsk	24	(18)
2007–2008	Naftan Novopolotsk	33	(4)
2009	Smorgon	10	(0)
2009–2010	Polotsk	38	(14)
2011	Khimik Svetlogorsk	23	(0)
- * Club domestic league appearances and goals

Yury Aleshchanka (Belarusian: Юрый Алешчанка; Russian: Юрий Алещенко; born 6 September 1984) is a retired Belarusian professional footballer.
