= Anton Putsila =

Belarusian footballer (born 1987)

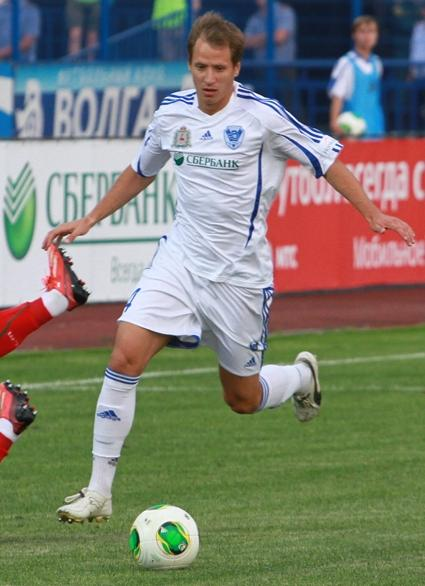
- With Volga in 2013

Personal information
- Full name: Anton Kanstantsinavich Putsila
- Date of birth: 23 June 1987 (age 39)
- Place of birth: Orsha, Vitebsk Oblast, Belarusian SSR, Soviet Union
- Height: 1.80 m (5 ft 11 in)
- Position: Midfielder

Youth career
- 2001–2003: RUOR Minsk

Senior career*
Years	Team	Apps	(Gls)
2003	RUOR Minsk	13	(2)
2004–2010	Dinamo Minsk	80	(7)
2008	→ Hamburger SV (loan)	3	(0)
2010–2013	SC Freiburg	45	(0)
2013–2014	Volga Nizhny Novgorod	37	(2)
2014–2015	Torpedo Moscow	20	(4)
2015–2017	Gaziantepspor	31	(2)
2017–2018	Ankaragücü	34	(4)
2019–2020	Altay	47	(5)
2021–2023	Dinamo Minsk	52	(6)
Total		362	(32)

International career
2007–2009	Belarus U21	11	(1)
2008–2019	Belarus	56	(6)
- * Club domestic league appearances and goals

Anton Kanstantsinavich Putsila (Belarusian: Анто́н Канстанці́навіч Пуці́ла; Russian: Анто́н Константи́нович Пути́ло, romanized: Anton Konstantinovich Putilo; born 23 June 1987) is a Belarusian former professional footballer. He made 56 appearances for the Belarus national team scoring six goals.

== Club career ==
Born in Orsha, Putsila played youth football at RUOR Minsk before signing a professional contract with Dinamo Minsk in January 2004. Before his loan to Hamburger SV he appeared 21 times in 2007 as a midfielder for Dinamo Minsk in the Belarusian Premier League, scoring one goal.

He was loaned to Hamburg in January 2008 for a fee of €500,000. In the second half of the 2007–08 season, he made three Bundesliga appearances for Hamburger SV, coming on as a substitute each time.

On 21 June 2010, he announced his move to SC Freiburg on a free transfer on 1 January 2011.

== International career ==
Putsila played for the Belarus national under-17 team, and the Belarus national under-21 team, earning six caps and scoring one goal. He made his debut for the senior Belarus national team on 2 February 2008.

== Career statistics ==
Scores and results list Belarus' goal tally first, score column indicates score after each Putsila goal.

List of international goals scored by Anton Putsila
No.	Date	Venue	Opponent	Score	Result	Competition
1	3 March 2010	Antalya Atatürk Stadium, Antalya, Turkey	Armenia	1–0	3–1	Friendly
2	27 May 2010	Stadion Villach Lind, Villach, Austria	Honduras	1–1	2–2	Friendly
3	27 May 2010	Stadion Villach Lind, Villach, Austria	Honduras	2–1	2–2	Friendly
4	7 June 2011	Dinamo Stadium, Minsk, Belarus	Luxembourg	2–0	2–0	UEFA Euro 2012 qualification
5	11 September 2012	Stade De France, Saint-Denis, France	France	1–2	1–3	2014 FIFA World Cup qualification
6	3 June 2013	A. Le Coq Arena, Tallinn, Estonia	Estonia	1–0	2–0	Friendly

== Honours ==
Dinamo Minsk

- Belarusian Premier League: 2004, 2023
