= Zaza Chelidze =

Georgian footballer (born 1987)

Personal information
- Date of birth: 12 January 1987 (age 39)
- Place of birth: Tbilisi, Georgian SSR
- Height: 1.87 m (6 ft 1 1/2 in)
- Position: Central defender

Youth career
- 2004–2005: Dinamo Tbilisi

Senior career*
Years	Team	Apps	(Gls)
2004–2005	Norchi-Dinamoeli-2		
2005–2006	Dila Gori	4	(0)
2006–2007	Sioni Bolnisi	5	(0)
2007	Dinamo Batumi	8	(0)
2008–2009	Sioni Bolnisi	32	(4)
2009	Olimpi Rustavi	12	(0)
2010–2011	Dinamo Brest	48	(4)
2012	Metalurgi Rustavi	0	(0)
2012–2013	Torpedo Kutaisi	54	(2)
2014	Zestafoni	14	(1)
2014	Gomel	9	(1)
2015	Torpedo Kutaisi	13	(0)
2015–2016	Dinamo Tbilisi	29	(4)
2017	Chikhura Sachkhere	16	(1)
2018	Dinamo Batumi	3	(0)
2018	Telavi	13	(1)
- * Club domestic league appearances and goals as of 31 December 2018

Zaza Chelidze (Georgian: ზაზა ჭელიძე; born 12 January 1987) is a Georgian former professional football player.
