= Zhodzina =

Town in Minsk Region, Belarus

Zhodzina Жодзіна (Belarusian) Жодино (Russian) Zhodino
- Town
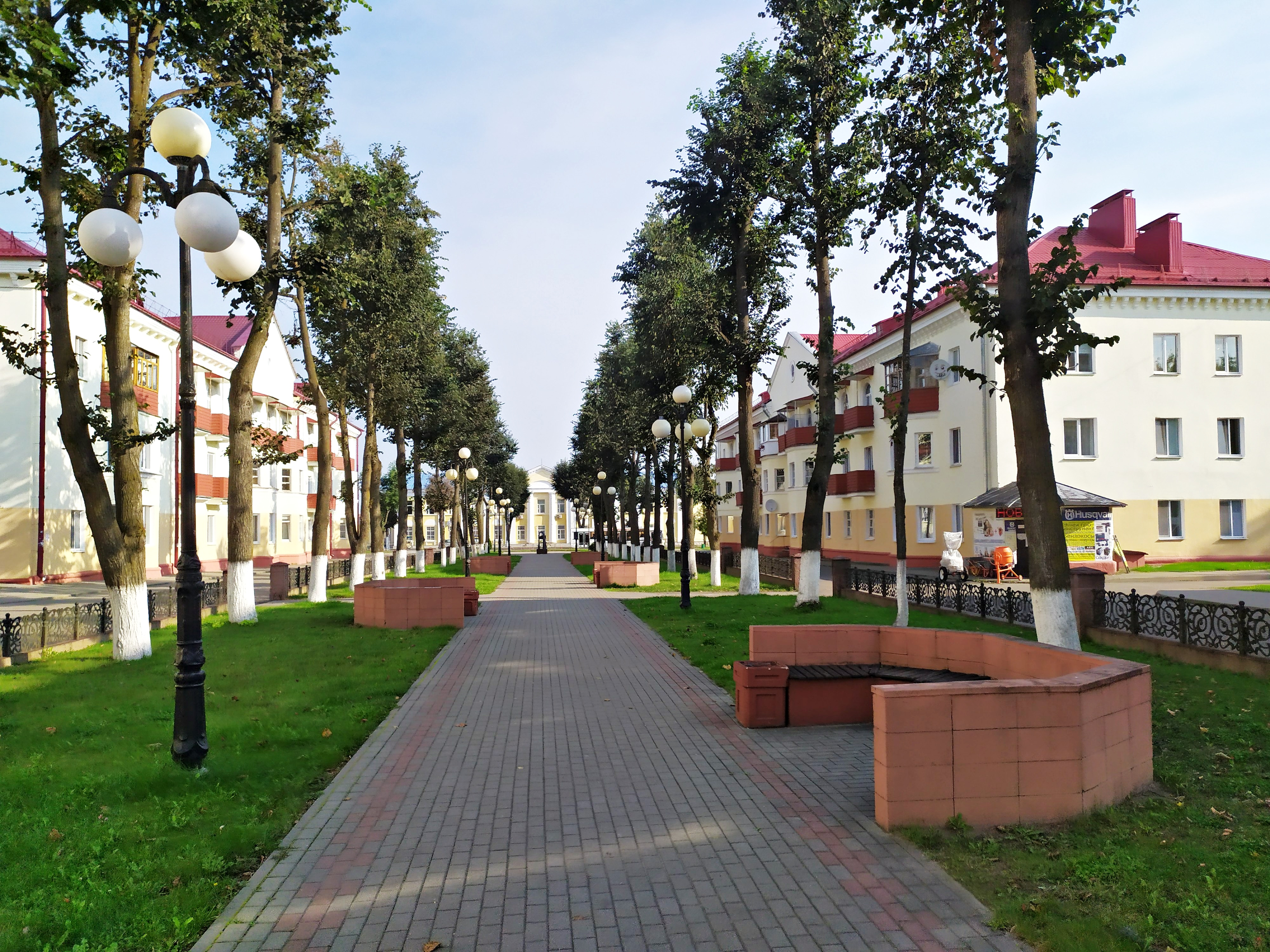

- Flag Coat of arms

- Location within Belarus
- Coordinates: 54°06′00″N 28°21′00″E
- Country: Belarus
- Region: Minsk Region

Government
  - Mayor: Dimitri Zablotsky

Area
  - Total: 21.97 km^{2} (8.48 sq mi)
- Elevation: 250 m (820 ft)

Population (2026)
  - Total: 62,983
  - Density: 2,867/km^{2} (7,425/sq mi)
- Time zone: UTC+3 (MSK)
- Postal code: 222160, 222163
- Area code: +375 1775
- License plate: 5
- Website: Official website

Zhodzina or Zhodino (Note: Belarusian: Жодзіна, romanized: Žodzina, IPA: [ˈʐodzʲina]; Russian: Жодино, IPA: [ˈʐodʲɪnə]; Polish: Żodzino.) is a town in Minsk Region, in central Belarus, located 50 kilometres (31 mi) north-east of Minsk. The city covers an area of 19 square kilometres (7.3 sq mi). As of 2026, it has a population of 62,983.

== History ==
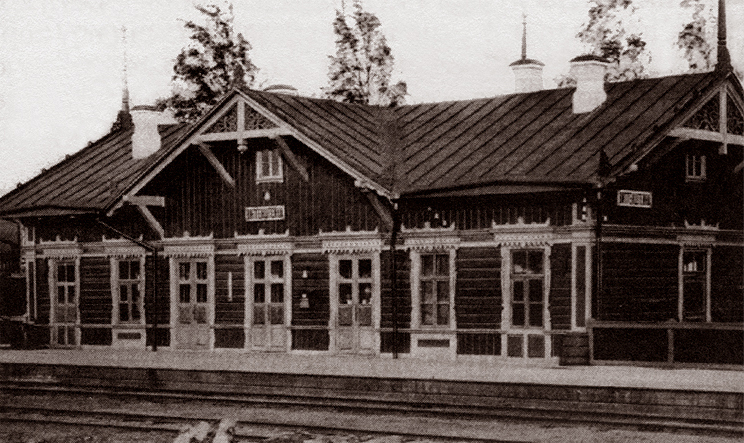
Railway station in the early 20th century

The settlement is first mentioned in 1688, belonging to the Radziwiłł family.

It has had city status since 1963.

On 13 August 2020, Zhodzina was the site of the first large-scale worker strike in Belarus, at the BelAZ automobile plant, in protest of the contested results of the 2020 Belarusian presidential elections.

== Geography ==
The town, the most populous among the settlements in the surrounding Smalyavichy District (Smala in Lithuanian language is Tar and '-evichiai' is Lithuanian family ending), is situated 50 km (31 mi) north-east of Minsk and 15 km (9 mi) south-west of Barysaw. Zhodzina (Zhodynas in Lithuanian language means Vocabulary) is divided by the Plisa River, and it has a small lake in its southern suburb.

== Education ==
There are nine schools, two high schools, one professional lyceum and Zhodzina Polytechnical College in the city. Currently, there are no higher educational institutions in the city.

== Economy ==
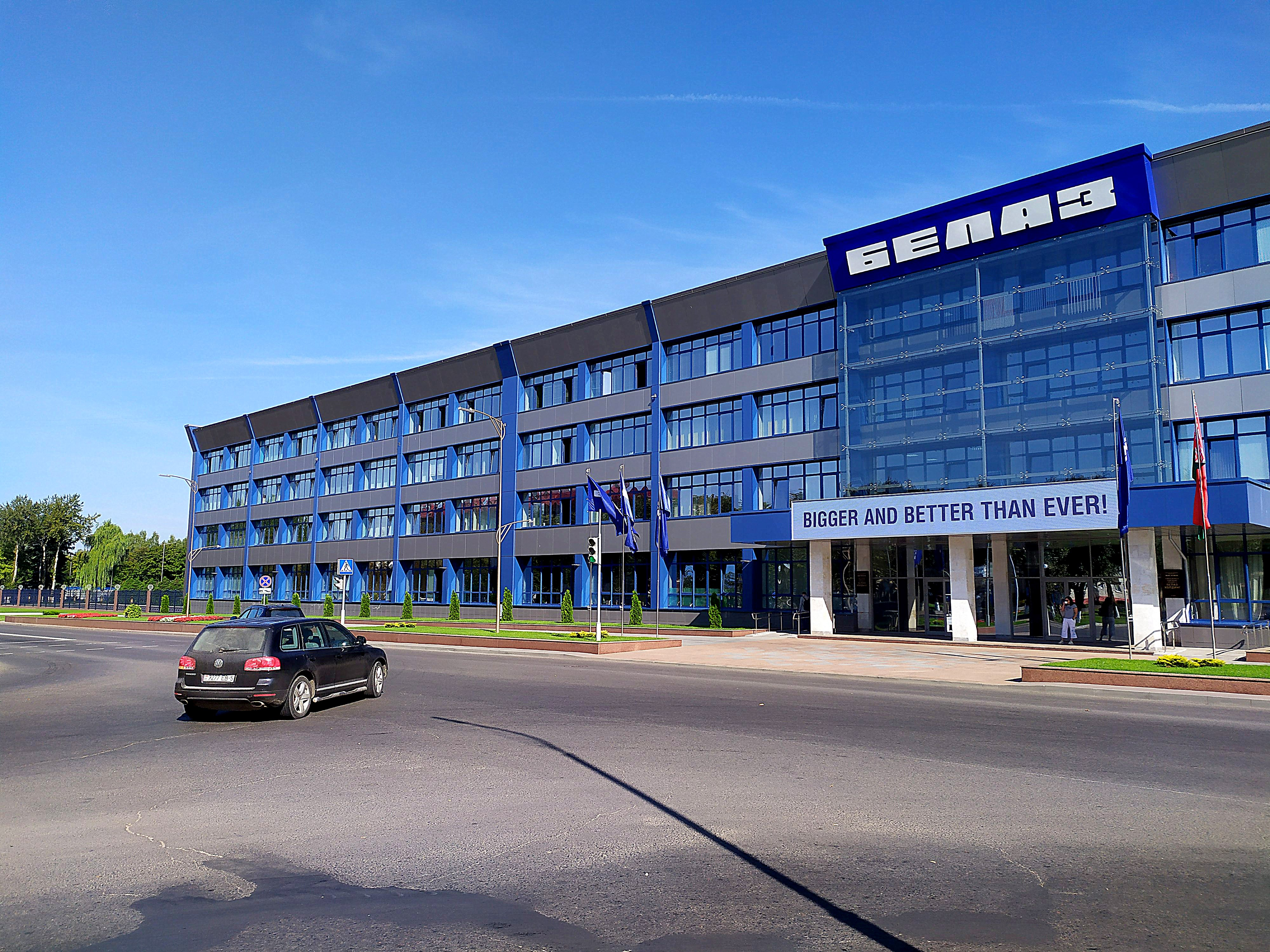
BelAZ

The BelAZ (The Belarusian Automobile Plant) is the largest employer in the city; it employs about 11,000 workers, one-sixth of the local population. Every third mining truck in the world is produced by BelAZ. The largest truck weighs 360 tonnes and can carry 450 tonnes of load. Another important factory is the clothing manufacturer SVITANAK, which produces children's and adults' clothes. Its products are exported to European countries.

== Transport ==
Zhodzina is served by the M1 highway, part of the European route E30, an international highway that links Berlin and Warsaw to Moscow. It has two railway stations (Zhodzina and the stop of Zhodzina Yuzhny) on the international line Minsk-Moscow; and its main station is served by some international trains as the Sibirjak Berlin-Novosibirsk. Minsk International Airport is 40 km (25 mi) from Zhodzina.

== Sport ==
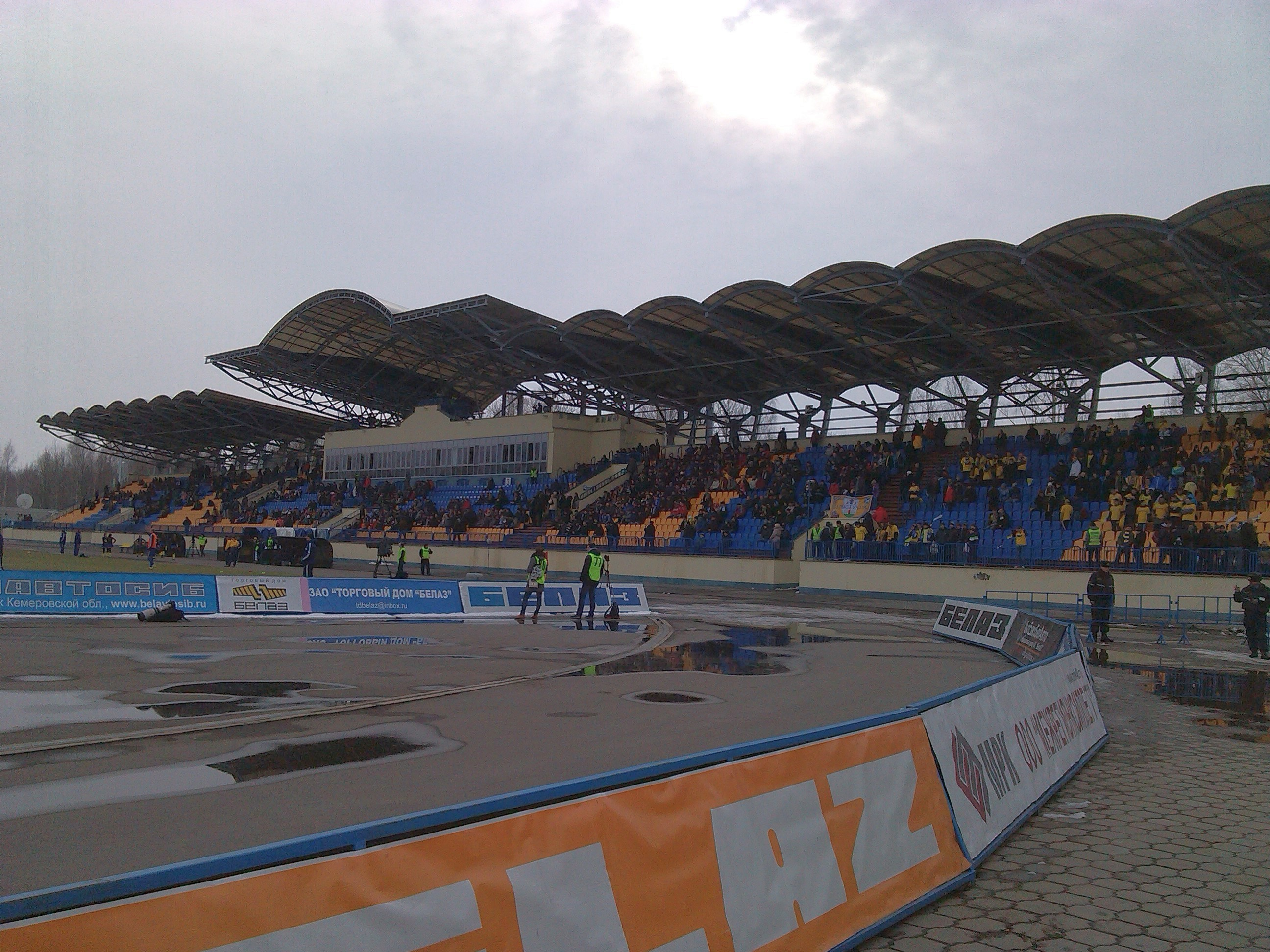
Torpedo Stadium

The local football club is the Torpedo-BelAZ Zhodino, playing in the Belarusian Premier League. Its home ground is the Torpedo Stadium.

== Notable people ==
- Roman Golovchenko (b. 1973), prime minister
- Mikalay Kashewski (b. 1980), footballer
- Nastassia Novikava (b. 1981), weightlifter
- Yury Shumanski (b. 1980), retired Belarusian professional footballer

== International relations ==
Zhodzina is twinned with:

- Dalanzadgad, Mongolia
- Hîncești, Moldova
- Horishni Plavni, Ukraine
- Kajaran, Armenia
- Mytishchi, Russia
- Neryungrinsky District, Russia
- Olmaliq, Uzbekistan
- Oryol, Russia
- Panagyurishte, Bulgaria
- Plastovsky District, Russia
- Považská Bystrica, Slovakia
- (Georgia (country)) Rustavi, Georgia
- Ukmergė, Lithuania
- Verkhnyaya Pyshma, Russia
- Zheleznogorsk, Russia

== See also ==
- Prison Number 8
