= FC RUOR Minsk =

RUOR Minsk RVAR Minsk
- Founded: 1995
- Dissolved: 2004 (senior team)
- League: Belarusian Second League
- 2003: 4th

FC RUOR Minsk or FK RVAR Minsk (Belarusian: ФК РВАР Мінск) was a Belarusian football club based in Minsk.

== History ==
RUOR/RVAR Minsk was a student team representing the Republican State School of Olympic Reserves (Respublikanskaye Vuchylishcha Alimpyskaha Rezyervu in Belarusian and Respublikansoye Uchilishe Olimpiyskogo Reserva in Russian). From 1995 till 1997 it acted as reserve/feeder team for MPKC Mozyr and played under names MPKC-2 (1995) and MPKC-96 (1996–1997). In 1998 the partnership with MPKC ended and the team continued playing under their original name. Since 2004, the team withdrew from the Belarusian Second League and continued playing at youth level only. Several notable team graduates (Artem Kontsevoy, Leonid Kovel, Dmitry Lentsevich, Yuri Zhevnov, Alyaksandr Martynovich, Vitali Kutuzov, Anton Putsila) went on to represent Belarus national football team.
