= FC DSK Gomel =

DSK Gomel
- Full name: FC DSK Gomel
- Founded: 2008
- Dissolved: 2013
- Ground: SDYUSHOR-8 Stadium, Gomel
- League: Belarusian First League
- 2012: 14th
Home colours	Away colours

FC DSK Gomel was a Belarusian football club based in Gomel. DSK stands for Домостоительный комбинат (Domostroitel'ny Kombinat, English: Housebuilding Combine).

== History ==
The team was founded in 2008 and won the Second League the same year. In 2009 they debuted in Belarusian First League. In 2010 DSK reached semifinals of Belarusian Cup. The club was dissolved before 2013 season due to financial troubles.

In early 2016 the club had an intention to rejoin the Second League for the upcoming season, but ultimately withdrew its application.
