= 2004–05 Belarusian Cup =

Tournament details
- Country: Belarus
- Teams: 46

Final positions
- Champions: MTZ-RIPO Minsk (1st title)
- Runners-up: BATE Borisov

Tournament statistics
- Matches played: 51
- Goals scored: 143 (2.8 per match)
- Top goal scorer(s): 8 players (3 goals each)

The 2004–05 Belarusian Cup was the 14th edition of the football knock-out competition in Belarus. Contrary to the league season, the competition has been conducted in a fall-spring rhythm. The first games were played on 14 July 2004 and the final on 22 May 2005. MTZ-RIPO Minsk won the Cup.

== First round ==
All 13 teams from the Second League, 15 teams from the First League (out of 16, excluding Dinamo Minsk youth reserve team Dinamo-Juni Minsk) and 2 amateur clubs started in this round. The games were played on 14 July 2004.

14 July 2004	Sozh Krichev (III)	0–6	Dnepr-DUSSh-1 Rogachev (II)	Krichev
			Velikoborets 30'; Doylidov 36', 48', 81'; Blagodarov 43'; Chmurov 47'	Attendance: 600; Referee: Aleksandr Lodyanoy (Orsha)

14 July 2004	Osipovichi (III)	3–1	Torpedo-Kadino Mogilev (II)	Osipovichi
	Vetoshkin 36'; Ankudinov 63'; Aniskevich 70'		Andreychikov 69'	Attendance: 1,000; Referee: Valery Vyalichka (Minsk)

14 July 2004	Polotsk (III)	0–2	Lokomotiv Minsk (II)	Polotsk
			Litvinchuk 30', 85'	Attendance: 200; Referee: Dmitry Abushkevich (Mogilev)

14 July 2004	DYuSSh-2 Smorgon (A)	1–2	Lida (II)	Smorgon
	Andriyenko 34'		Zhukowski 69'; Tretyak 77'	Attendance: 600; Referee: Sergey Sakharevich (Grodno)

14 July 2004	Kommunalnik Zhlobin (III)	1–1 (a.e.t.) (5–6 p)	Khimik Svetlogorsk (II)	Minsk
	Simonenko 106'		Jafarov 104' (pen.)	Attendance: 1,200; Referee: Vyacheslav Kolochinsky (Mogilev)

14 July 2004	Smena Minsk (III)	4–1	Smorgon (II)	Minsk
	Denisyuk 3', 35', 69'; Strakovich 39'		Safronaw 47'	Attendance: 180; Referee: Igor Kruk (Molodechno)

14 July 2004	Polesye Kozenki (III)	1–2	Vertikal Kalinkovichi (II)	Kozenki
	Tikovets 43'		Luzhkov 6'; Belash 67'	Attendance: 100; Referee: Mikhail Tsukanov (Gomel)

14 July 2004	Gorki (III)	2–3	Molodechno (II)	Gorki
	Akulich 40'; Shevchik 90'		Krivetsky 35' (pen.); Grikhutik 65'; Savitsky 80' (pen.)	Attendance: 500; Referee: Igor Romanov (Mozyr)

14 July 2004	PMK-7 Gantsevichi (A)	0–5	Baranovichi (II)	Gantsevichi
			Balashow 23'; Khripach 36'; Malyavko 69'; Putrash 70', 71'	Attendance: 2,000; Referee: Yuriy Maistrov (Fanipol)

14 July 2004	Pinsk-900 (III)	3–2	Bereza (II)	Pinsk
	Volodko 9'; Baluk 28'; Kirilko 90'		Shved 23'; Myat 83'	Attendance: 600; Referee: Dmitry Yevnevich (Minsk)

14 July 2004	Gomel-SDYuShOR (III)	1–4	Veras Nesvizh (II)	Gomel
	Sigay 40'		Gavrilovich 14', 68'; Yermolenko 33'; Pyshnik 84'	Attendance: 100; Referee: Leonid Loznyukha (Minsk)

14 July 2004	Orsha (III)	1–3	Vedrich-97 Rechitsa (II)	Orsha
	Dalhanaw 53'		Dimitrov 19', 77'; Ganziuc 80'	Attendance: 700; Referee: Antuan Mayorov (Minsk)

14 July 2004	Livadiya Dzerzhinsk (III)	1–6	Kommunalnik Slonim (II)	Dzerzhinsk
	A.Yuraga 43'		Horbach 5'; Traskevich 30', 86'; Gorevalov 35' (o.g.); Zyulew 45', 90'	Attendance: 500; Referee: Aleksandr Chebykin (Minsk)

14 July 2004	Spartak-UOR Shklov (III)	1–3	Granit Mikashevichi (II)	Shklov
	Sugako 43'		Yawseenka 3'; Myasnikovich 35', 87'	Attendance: 300; Referee: Gennadiy Zverok (Minsk)

14 July 2004	Neman Mosty (III)	1–2	ZLiN Gomel (II)	Mosty
	Khilmanovich 44'		Pokatashkin 2'; Tkach 58'	Attendance: 200; Referee: Aleksandr Skrob (Stolbtsy)

== Round of 32 ==
15 winners of previous round were joined by 16 clubs from Premier League. Slavia Mozyr from Premier League advanced to the Round of 16 by drawing of lots. The games were played on 14 and 15 August 2004. Match involving Dinamo Minsk was rescheduled to 25 September 2004.

14 August 2004	Smena Minsk (III)	0–1	Darida Minsk Raion	Minsk
16:00 UTC+3			Serenkov 69'	Stadium: KFP Smena; Attendance: 300; Referee: Andrey Zhukov (Minsk)

14 August 2004	Osipovichi (III)	0–1 (a.e.t.)	MTZ-RIPO Minsk	Osipovichi
17:00 UTC+3			Parfyonaw 102'	Stadium: Yunost Stadium; Attendance: 1,200; Referee: Oleg Chikun (Stolbtsy)

14 August 2004	Kommunalnik Slonim (II)	1–0	Torpedo Zhodino	Slonim
17:00 UTC+3	Ostapchik 14'			Stadium: Yunost Stadium; Attendance: 500; Referee: Sergey Shmolik (Brest)

14 August 2004	Molodechno (II)	2–5	Belshina Bobruisk	Chist
17:00 UTC+3	Savitsky 19'; Vyazhevich 90'		Mironchik 24'; Kopylchenko 46', 60'; Burdin 57'; Chernov 58'	Stadium: School Stadium; Attendance: 200; Referee: Antuan Mayorov (Minsk)

14 August 2004	Khimik Svetlogorsk (II)	0–3	Dinamo Brest	Svetlogorsk
17:00 UTC+3			Vasilyuk 6', 78'; Kondrashuk 77'	Stadium: Bumazhnik Stadium; Attendance: 4,200; Referee: Valery Vyalichka (Minsk)

14 August 2004	Veras Nesvizh (II)	1–2	Naftan Novopolotsk	Nesvizh
17:00 UTC+3	Gavrilovich 56'		Kuzminich 76'; Dubina 78' (pen.)	Stadium: Urozhay Stadium; Attendance: 2,100; Referee: Georgiy Verbitsky (Slonim)

14 August 2004	Vertikal Kalinkovichi (II)	0–2 (a.e.t.)	Shakhtyor Soligorsk	Kalinkovichi
17:00 UTC+3			Podrez 100'; Nikifarenka 115'	Stadium: Yunost Stadium; Attendance: 2,500; Referee: Valeriy Yazevich (Lida)

14 August 2004	Baranovichi (II)	1–0	Lokomotiv Vitebsk	Baranovichi
17:00 UTC+3	Chuduk 29'			Stadium: Lokomotiv Stadium; Attendance: 4,500; Referee: Mikhail Tsukanov (Gomel)

14 August 2004	Pinsk-900 (III)	0–3	Gomel	Pinsk
17:00 UTC+3			Razumaw 11'; Pankavets 37'; Usaw 86'	Stadium: Pripyat Stadium; Attendance: 2,500; Referee: Gennadiy Yarets (Minsk)

14 August 2004	Granit Mikashevichi (II)	0–1	Torpedo-SKA Minsk	Luninets
17:30 UTC+3			Drabenyuk 53'	Stadium: Polesye Stadium; Attendance: 1,200; Referee: Viktor Chernik (Mosty)

14 August 2004	Dnepr-DUSSh-1 Rogachev (II)	0–2	Dnepr-Transmash Mogilev	Rogachev
18:00 UTC+3			Pimenov 26' (o.g.); Bychanok 72'	Stadium: DYuSSh Stadium; Attendance: 500; Referee: Aleksandr Chebykin (Minsk)

14 August 2004	Lida (II)	1–0	Zvezda-BGU Minsk	Lida
18:00 UTC+3	Tretyak 53'			Stadium: City Stadium; Attendance: 1,000; Referee: Yuriy Maistrov (Fanipol)

14 August 2004	Lokomotiv Minsk (II)	3–3 (a.e.t.) (1–3 p)	Neman Grodno	Minsk
18:00 UTC+3	Krivets 15'; Denisyuk 85'; Martynov 61'		Dolya 12', 34'; Metelitsa 77', 90+1'	Stadium: Lokomotiv Stadium; Attendance: 200; Referee: Aleksei Kulbakov (Gomel)
	Penalties
	Mikhnavets (penalty scored); Brazauskas (penalty missed); Martynov (penalty missed); Denisyuk (penalty missed)		(penalty missed) Dolya; (penalty scored) Radushko; (penalty scored) Narushevich; (penalty scored) Metelitsa

15 August 2004	ZLiN Gomel (II)	1–2	BATE Borisov	Gomel
15:00 UTC+3	Vasilevskiy 32'		Shkabara 82'; Rubnenko 87'	Stadium: Gomselmash Stadium; Attendance: 2,800; Referee: Nikolay Metelskiy (Minsk)

25 September 2004	Vedrich-97 Rechitsa (II)	1–1 (a.e.t.) (3–5 p)	Dinamo Minsk	Rechitsa
16:00 UTC+3	Eramchuk 71' (pen.)		Bondaruk 42' (o.g.)	Stadium: Central Stadium; Attendance: 500; Referee: Igor Kruk (Molodechno)
	Penalties
	Eramchuk (penalty scored); Ganziuc (penalty scored); Bondaruk (penalty scored); Azarov (penalty missed)		(penalty scored) Razin; (penalty scored) Lentsevich; (penalty scored) Kovel; (penalty scored) Zoubek; (penalty scored) Valadzyankow

== Round of 16 ==
The games were played on 12 October, 11 and 14 November 2004.

12 October 2004	Naftan Novopolotsk	2–3	Baranovichi (II)	Novopolotsk
15:00 UTC+3	Kakabadze 18'; Kirenkin 61'		Sergel 12', 34'; Korotkevich 88'	Stadium: Atlant Stadium; Attendance: 500; Referee: Aleksei Kulbakov (Gomel)

11 November 2004	Belshina Bobruisk	1–0 (a.e.t.)	Dinamo Minsk	Bobruisk
13:00 UTC+3	Chernov 110' (pen.)			Stadium: Spartak Stadium; Attendance: 1,200; Referee: Valeriy Yazevich (Lida)

11 November 2004	Torpedo-SKA Minsk	1–1 (a.e.t.) (4–5 p)	Dnepr-Transmash Mogilev	Minsk
13:00 UTC+3	Trofimenko 54'		V.Baranov 84'	Stadium: Torpedo Stadium; Attendance: 300; Referee: Georgiy Verbitsky (Slonim)
	Penalties
	Drabenyuk (penalty scored); Kozak (penalty scored); Mikhalev (penalty missed); Văluță (penalty scored); Rahozhkin (penalty scored)		(penalty scored) V.Baranov; (penalty scored) Kapaw; (penalty scored) S.Galiuza; (penalty scored) A.Baranaw; (penalty scored) I.Galiuza

11 November 2004	Neman Grodno	1–1 (a.e.t.) (4–2 p)	Shakhtyor Soligorsk	Grodno
13:00 UTC+3	D.Kalachow 109' (o.g.)		Yurevich 92'	Stadium: Neman Stadium; Attendance: 1,100; Referee: Mikhail Tsukanov (Gomel)
	Penalties
	Radushko (penalty scored); Prikhodko (penalty scored); Sulima (penalty scored); Vasin (penalty missed); Nadziewski (penalty scored)		(penalty scored) Tikhonchik; (penalty missed) Sļesarčuks; (penalty scored) Hukayla; (penalty missed) Belavusaw

11 November 2004	Dinamo Brest	1–2	BATE Borisov	Brest
13:00 UTC+3	Boyka 77'		Yermakovich 64'; Vishnyakow 84'	Stadium: OSK Brestsky; Attendance: 1,200; Referee: Yuriy Kuntsevich (Grodno)

11 November 2004	Gomel	1–0	Slavia Mozyr	Gomel
13:00 UTC+3	Zabolotsky 69'			Stadium: Central Stadium; Attendance: 1,500; Referee: Andrey Zhukov (Minsk)

11 November 2004	Darida Minsk Raion	2–0	Kommunalnik Slonim (II)	Minsk
13:00 UTC+3	Serenkov 10', 69'			Stadium: Darida Stadium; Attendance: 350; Referee: Oleg Chikun (Stolbtsy)

14 November 2004	MTZ-RIPO Minsk	3–0	Lida (II)	Minsk
13:00 UTC+3	Khizhnyak 31'; Parfyonaw 52'; Tarashchyk 65'			Stadium: Traktor Stadium; Attendance: 400; Referee: Mikhail Arkhipov (Zhodino)

== Quarterfinals ==
The first legs were played on 3 April 2005. The second legs were played on 7 April 2005.

Team 1	Agg.	Team 2	1st leg	2nd leg
BATE Borisov	(a) 2–2	Dnepr-Transmash Mogilev	1–0	1–2
Gomel	1–1 (a)	Darida Minsk Raion	1–1	0–0
Neman Grodno	(a) 2–2	Belshina Bobruisk (II)	0–1	2–1
MTZ-RIPO Minsk	2–1	Baranovichi (II)	0–0	2–1

=== First leg ===
3 April 2005	BATE Borisov	1–0	Dnepr-Transmash Mogilev	Minsk
15:00 UTC+3	Baranaw 53'			Stadium: Football Manege; Attendance: 1,500; Referee: Valery Vyalichka (Minsk)

3 April 2005	Gomel	1–1	Darida Minsk Raion	Gomel
16:00 UTC+3	Denisyuk 3'		Dzenisevich 76'	Stadium: Central Stadium; Attendance: 4,500; Referee: Yuriy Kuntsevich (Grodno)

3 April 2005	Neman Grodno	0–1	Belshina Bobruisk (II)	Grodno
17:00 UTC+3			E.Gradoboyev 14'	Stadium: Neman Stadium; Attendance: 8,000; Referee: Aleksei Kulbakov (Gomel)

3 April 2005	MTZ-RIPO Minsk	0–0	Baranovichi (II)	Minsk
19:00 UTC+3				Stadium: Football Manege; Attendance: 1,300; Referee: Oleg Chikun (Stolbtsy)

=== Second leg ===
7 April 2005	Dnepr-Transmash Mogilev	2–1 (2–2(a) agg.)	BATE Borisov	Mogilev
16:30 UTC+3	Pawlaw 20'; Bondarev 54'		Khaletski 56'	Stadium: Spartak Stadium; Attendance: 3,500; Referee: Sergey Shmolik (Brest)

7 April 2005	Belshina Bobruisk (II)	1–2 (2–2(a) agg.)	Neman Grodno	Mogilev
16:30 UTC+3	Papkovich 80'		Hryharaw 45'; Mamido 55'	Stadium: Spartak Stadium; Attendance: 3,500; Referee: Aleksandr Chebykin (Minsk)

7 April 2005	Baranovichi (II)	1–2 (1–2 agg.)	MTZ-RIPO Minsk	Baranovichi
15:00 UTC+3	Chuduk 45'		Parfyonaw 42'; Tarashchyk 72'	Stadium: Lokomotiv Stadium; Attendance: 5,000; Referee: Yuriy Maistrov (Fanipol)

7 April 2005	Darida Minsk Raion	0–0 ((a)1–1 agg.)	Gomel	Minsk
19:00 UTC+3				Stadium: Football Manege; Attendance: 1,200; Referee: Georgiy Verbitsky (Slonim)

== Semifinals ==
The first legs were played on 12 April 2005. The second legs were played on 4 May 2005.

Team 1	Agg.	Team 2	1st leg	2nd leg
MTZ-RIPO Minsk	5–1	Neman Grodno	2–0	3–1
Darida Minsk Raion	0–2	BATE Borisov	0–1	0–1

=== First leg ===
12 April 2005	MTZ-RIPO Minsk	2–0	Neman Grodno	Minsk
17:00 UTC+3	Tarashchyk 9'; Afanasyev 40'			Stadium: Traktor Stadium; Attendance: 1,100; Referee: Konstantin Daylid (Brest)

12 April 2005	Darida Minsk Raion	0–1	BATE Borisov	Minsk
17:30 UTC+3			Khaletski 2'	Stadium: Darida Stadium; Attendance: 2,500; Referee: Andrey Zhukov (Minsk)

=== Second leg ===
4 May 2005	Neman Grodno	1–3 (1–5 agg.)	MTZ-RIPO Minsk	Grodno
17:30 UTC+3	Metelitsa 78'		Kontsevoy 15', 61'; Mkhitaryan 35' (pen.)	Stadium: Neman Stadium; Attendance: 1,500; Referee: Mikhail Tsukanov (Gomel)

4 May 2005	BATE Borisov	1–0 (2–0 agg.)	Darida Minsk Raion	Borisov
18:30 UTC+3	Byahanski 56'			Stadium: City Stadium; Attendance: 2,700; Referee: Oleg Chikun (Stolbtsy)

== Final ==
22 May 2005
18:00 UTC+3

MTZ-RIPO Minsk	2–1	BATE Borisov
Fedorov 42'; Kontsevoy 73'	Report	Lebedzew 28'

Dinamo Stadium, Minsk
Attendance: 15,500
Referee: Aleksei Kulbakov (Gomel)

MTZ-RIPO:
GK	1	(Belarus) Alyaksandr Sulima (c)
RB	6	(Belarus) Sergey Mikhnyuk
CB	3	(Belarus) Alyaksandr Stashchanyuk
CB	4	(Belarus) Aleh Popel
LB	5	(Belarus) Alyaksandr Bylina
RM	11	(Belarus) Mikhail Afanasyev		(substituted off) 86'
CM	10	(Armenia) Hamlet Mkhitaryan
CM	9	(Belarus) Vital Tarashchyk		(substituted off) 61'
LM	8	(Belarus) Dzmitry Shchagrykovich
RF	7	(Belarus) Artem Kontsevoy
LF	2	(Ukraine) Denys Fedorov		(substituted off) 46'
Substitutes:
GK	12	(Russia) Vasili Kuznetsov
DF	13	(Belarus) Ihar Maltsaw	(yellow card) 85'	(substituted on) 46'
MF	14	(Belarus) Stanislav Shakhraev
DF	15	(Belarus) Sergey Tsvetinsky		(substituted on) 86'
MF	16	(Belarus) Mihail Eramchuk		(substituted on) 61'
FW	17	(Belarus) Sergey Kisly
DF	18	(Russia) Aleksandr Gorbachyov
Manager:
(Belarus) Yuri Puntus

BATE:
GK	1	(Belarus) Alyaksandr Fyedarovich
RB	21	(Belarus) Vadim Skripchenko
CB	4	(Belarus) Artem Radkov	(yellow card) 82'
LB	3	(Belarus) Dmitry Molosh
DM	2	(Belarus) Dzmitry Likhtarovich		(substituted off) 76'
DM	7	(Belarus) Alyaksandr Yermakovich (c)		(substituted off) 46'
RM	18	(Belarus) Alyaksandr Kobets
CM	20	(Belarus) Alyaksandr Baranaw		(substituted off) 62'
LM	16	(Belarus) Andrey Shorokh
RF	24	(Belarus) Pavel Byahanski
LF	14	(Belarus) Alyaksandr Lebedzew
Substitutes:
GK	12	(Belarus) Barys Pankrataw
MF	5	(Belarus) Dmitry Rubnenko
FW	11	(Belarus) Alyaksandr Vishnyakow	(yellow card) 90+3'	(substituted on) 62'
DF	13	(Belarus) Dzmitry Klimovich		(substituted on) 46'
DF	15	(Belarus) Maksim Zhavnerchik		(substituted on) 76'
DF	19	(Belarus) Alyaksey Khaletski
MF	22	(Belarus) Ihar Stasevich
Manager:
(Belarus) Igor Kriushenko
