= Gorbachev (surname) =

Gorbachev (Горбачёв, Russian pronunciation: [ɡərbɐˈtɕɵf]) is a Russian surname. It derives from a word meaning "Hunchback". The Ukrainian equivalent is Horbanenko and the Belarusian equivalent is Harbachow.

== People with the surname Gorbachev ==
- Mikhail Gorbachev (Михаил Горбачёв) (1931–2022), general secretary of the Communist Party of the Soviet Union and last leader of the Soviet Union
- Nikolai Gorbachev (1948–2019), Soviet-born Belarusian sprint canoer
- Yuri Gorbachev (born 1948), Russian-American painter and sculptor

== Other variants ==
- Raisa Gorbacheva (Раиса Горбачёва, 1932–1999), wife of Mikhail Gorbachev
- Aleksandr Gorbachyov (disambiguation), various people
- Boris Gorbachyov (1892–1937), Soviet komkor
- Igor Gorbachyov (1927–2003), Russian stage and film actor
- Ivan Sergeyevich Gorbachyov (1902–1941), Red Army major general
- Timofey Gorbachyov (1900–1973), Soviet scientist, mining specialist
- Mihail Harbachow (Belarusian Міхаіл Гарбачоў, Russian Михаил Горбачёв), Belarusian footballer
