= Sergey Tsvetinsky =

Belarusian footballer

Personal information
- Date of birth: 22 February 1984 (age 42)
- Place of birth: Molodechno, Minsk Oblast, Belarusian SSR
- Height: 1.80 m (5 ft 11 in)
- Position: Defender

Youth career
- 2001–2003: Dinamo Minsk

Senior career*
Years	Team	Apps	(Gls)
2001	Dinamo-2 Minsk	27	(1)
2002–2003	Dinamo-Juni Minsk	36	(0)
2004–2005	MTZ-RIPO Minsk	36	(0)
2006	Naftan Novopolotsk	10	(0)
2007	Smorgon	18	(0)
2008	Savit Mogilev	19	(0)
2009	Belshina Bobruisk	16	(0)
2010	Granit Mikashevichi	29	(0)
2011	Gorodeya	24	(0)
2012–2016	Slutsk	112	(12)
2016	BFC Daugavpils	13	(0)
2017	Torpedo Minsk	28	(1)
2018	Lida	27	(1)
2019	Molodechno	8	(1)
2019	Smorgon	10	(1)

International career
2005	Belarus U21	4	(0)
- * Club domestic league appearances and goals

Sergey Tsvetinsky (Belarusian: Сяргей Цвяцiнскi; Russian: Сергей Цветинский; born 22 February 1984) is a Belarusian former professional footballer.

In July 2020 Tsvetinsky was found guilty of being involved in a match-fixing schema in Belarusian football. He was sentenced to one year of community service and banned from Belarusian football for one year.

== Honours ==
MTZ-RIPO Minsk

- Belarusian Cup winner: 2004–05
