= Sergey Mikhnyuk =

Belarusian footballer

Personal information
- Date of birth: 28 September 1983 (age 43)
- Height: 1.82 m (5 ft 11 1/2 in)
- Position: Defender

Youth career
- 2001–2002: Dinamo Minsk

Senior career*
Years	Team	Apps	(Gls)
2003–2004	Dinamo Minsk	0	(0)
2003	→ Granit Mikashevichi (loan)	24	(1)
2004	→ Lokomotiv Vitebsk (loan)	28	(0)
2005–2007	MTZ-RIPO Minsk	22	(0)
2008	Bereza	5	(0)
2009–2011	SKVICH Minsk	64	(3)
2015	Kolos-Druzhba	1	(0)
2022	Krechet Bereza	1	(0)
2023	Kommunalnik Beloozersk	0	(0)

International career
2004–2005	Belarus U21	5	(0)
- * Club domestic league appearances and goals

Sergey Mikhnyuk (Belarusian: Сяргей Міхнюк; Russian: Сергей Михнюк; born 28 September 1983) is a Belarusian former professional footballer.

== Honours ==
MTZ-RIPO Minsk

- Belarusian Cup winner: 2004–05
