= Alyaksandr Sulima =

Belarusian footballer

Personal information
- Full name: Alyaksandr Rychardavich Sulima
- Date of birth: 1 August 1979 (age 47)
- Place of birth: Grodno, Byelorussian SSR, Soviet Union
- Height: 1.80 m (5 ft 11 in)
- Position: Goalkeeper

Team information
- Current team: Neman Grodno (goalkeeping coach)

Youth career
- 1996–1999: Neman Grodno

Senior career*
Years	Team	Apps	(Gls)
1996–1999	Neman-2 Grodno	63	(0)
1997–2002	Neman Grodno	78	(0)
2003	Lada Togliatti	12	(0)
2003–2004	Neman Grodno	44	(0)
2005–2009	MTZ-RIPO Minsk	127	(0)
2010–2013	Dinamo Minsk	56	(0)
2014	Neman Grodno	13	(0)

International career
2000–2001	Belarus U21	4	(0)
2004–2006	Belarus	6	(0)

Managerial career
- 2015–2019: Belarus U21 (gk coach)
- 2019–2021: Belarus (gk coach)
- 2022–: Neman Grodno (gk coach)
- * Club domestic league appearances and goals

Alyaksandr Rychardavich Sulima (Belarusian: Аляксандр Рычардавіч Суліма, Russian: Александр Ричардович Сулима; born 1 August 1979) is a football coach and former player (goalkeeper) from Belarus. He is of Polish descent and can speak the language.

== Career ==
Born in Grodno, Sulima has played professional football in the Belarusian Premier League with FC Neman Grodno, FC MTZ-RIPO Minsk and FC Dinamo Minsk. He also had a brief spell in the Russian First Division with FC Lada Togliatti.

Sulima made his debut for the senior Belarus national football team in a friendly against Romania on 19 February 2004.

In June 2019, Sulima was appointed as goalkeeper coach for the national team of Belarus under newly hired manager Mikhail Markhel.

== Honours ==
MTZ-RIPO Minsk

- Belarusian Cup winner: 2004–05, 2007–08
