= Vasili Kuznetsov =

Vasili Kuznetsov may refer to:

- Vasily Kuznetsov (politician) (1901–1990), Soviet politician
- Vasili Kuznetsov (decathlete) (1932–2001), Soviet decathlete
- Vasili Kuznetsov (footballer) (born 1978), Russian footballer
- Vasily Kuznetsov (general) (1894–1964), Soviet general in World War II
- Vasily Kuznetsov (badminton) (born 1989), Russian badminton player
