= Mihail Eramchuk =

Belarusian footballer

Personal information
- Date of birth: 14 November 1980 (age 45)
- Place of birth: Rechytsa, Belarusian SSR
- Height: 1.80 m (5 ft 11 in)
- Position: Midfielder

Senior career*
Years	Team	Apps	(Gls)
1997–2000	Vedrich-97 Rechitsa	79	(6)
2001	Gomel	0	(0)
2002–2004	Vedrich-97 Rechitsa	73	(26)
2005–2009	MTZ-RIPO Minsk	121	(12)
2010–2011	Belshina Bobruisk	56	(3)
2012	Naftan Novopolotsk	5	(0)

Managerial career
- 2013–2014: Rechitsa-2014 (assistant)
- 2015: Rechitsa-2014
- * Club domestic league appearances and goals as of 5 December 2012

Mikhail Eramchuk (Belarusian: Міхаіл Ерамчук; Russian: Михаил Еремчук; born 14 November 1980 in Rechytsa) is a retired Belarusian professional footballer. As of 2015, he works as a head coach for Rechitsa-2014.

== Honours ==
MTZ-RIPO Minsk

- Belarusian Cup winner: 2004–05, 2007–08

Naftan Novopolotsk

- Belarusian Cup winner: 2011–12
