= Alyaksandr Bylina =

Belarusian professional footballer

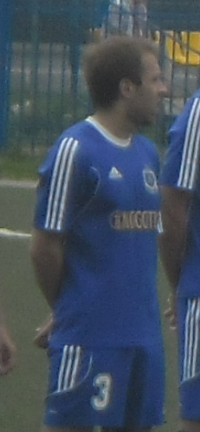
- Alyaksandr Bylina in 2013

Personal information
- Date of birth: 26 March 1981 (age 45)
- Place of birth: Minsk, Belarusian SSR
- Height: 1.79 m (5 ft 10 1/2 in)
- Position: Defender

Senior career*
Years	Team	Apps	(Gls)
1999	AFViS-RShVSM Minsk	22	(3)
2000–2002	Zvezda-VA-BGU Minsk	71	(4)
2003–2004	Torpedo-SKA Minsk	53	(2)
2005–2007	MTZ-RIPO Minsk	47	(1)
2007–2008	Shakhtyor Soligorsk	29	(1)
2009	Granit Mikashevichi	24	(2)
2010–2012	Belshina Bobruisk	66	(0)
2013	Dnepr Mogilev	22	(0)
2014	Slutsk	27	(0)
2015	Zvezda-BGU Minsk	27	(0)
2016–2017	Slutsk	26	(1)
2018–2019	NFK Minsk	36	(2)
2021	Brestzhilstroy	1	(0)

Managerial career
- 2022–: Dinamo Minsk (coach)
- * Club domestic league appearances and goals

Alyaksandr Bylina (Belarusian: Аляксандр Быліна; Russian: Александр Былина; born 26 March 1981) is a Belarusian professional football coach and former player.

== Honours ==
MTZ-RIPO Minsk

- Belarusian Cup winner: 2004–05
