= Ihar Maltsaw =

Belarusian footballer

Personal information
- Date of birth: 11 March 1986 (age 40)
- Place of birth: Lida, Belarusian SSR
- Height: 1.80 m (5 ft 11 in)
- Position: Defender

Youth career
- 2003–2004: MTZ-RIPO Minsk

Senior career*
Years	Team	Apps	(Gls)
2003–2009	MTZ-RIPO Minsk	108	(5)
2010–2011	Gomel	30	(1)
2011	→ Belshina Bobruisk (loan)	3	(0)
2012	Belshina Bobruisk	14	(1)
2012–2015	Gorodeya	88	(1)
2016	Slavia Mozyr	25	(0)

International career
2005–2009	Belarus U21	20	(0)
- * Club domestic league appearances and goals as of 31 December 2016

Ihar Maltsaw (Belarusian: Ігар Мальцаў; Russian: Игорь Мальцев; born 11 March 1986) is a Belarusian former professional footballer.

== Honours ==
MTZ-RIPO Minsk

- Belarusian Cup winner: 2004–05, 2007–08

Gomel

- Belarusian Cup winner: 2010–11
