= Aleh Popel =

Belarusian footballer

Personal information
- Date of birth: 1 January 1983 (age 43)
- Place of birth: Smorgon, Belarusian SSR
- Height: 1.83 m (6 ft 0 in)
- Position: Defender

Youth career
- 1999–2000: Neman Grodno
- 2000–2003: Lokomotiv Moscow

Senior career*
Years	Team	Apps	(Gls)
1999	Neman-2 Grodno	6	(0)
2000	Lokomotiv-2 Moscow	5	(0)
2004	Gomel	20	(1)
2005–2009	MTZ-RIPO Minsk	57	(0)
2008	→ Savit Mogilev (loan)	11	(0)
2010	Gomel	4	(0)
2010–2011	Smorgon	36	(1)
2012	Granit Mikashevichi	19	(2)
2013	Smorgon	27	(2)

International career
2002–2005	Belarus U-21	21	(0)
- * Club domestic league appearances and goals as of 4 January 2014

Aleh Popel (Belarusian: Алег Попель; Russian: Олег Геннадьевич Попель; born 1 January 1983) is a retired Belarusian professional footballer.

== Honours ==
MTZ-RIPO Minsk

- Belarusian Cup winner: 2004–05, 2007–08
