= Horbach =

Horbach may refer to:

== Places ==
- Horbach, Bad Kreuznach, a municipality in the district of Bad Kreuznach, Rhineland-Palatinate, Germany
- Horbach, Südwestpfalz, a municipality in the district Südwestpfalz, Rhineland-Palatinate, Germany
- Horbach, Westerwaldkreis, a municipality in the district Westerwaldkreis, Rhineland-Palatinate, Germany

== Other uses ==
- Horbach (surname)
