= Alyaksandr Stashchanyuk =

Belarusian footballer

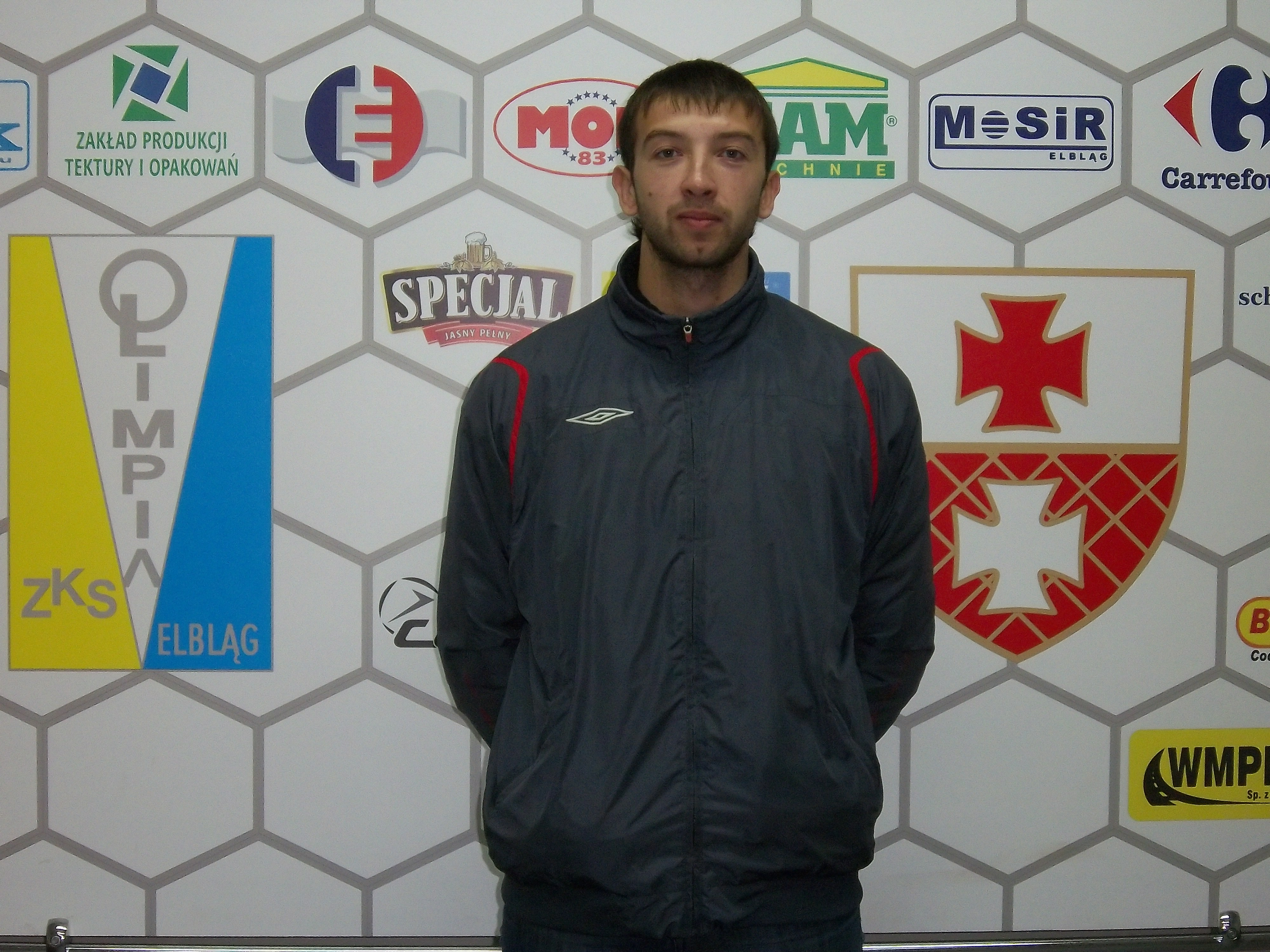
- Stashchanyuk in 2011.

Personal information
- Date of birth: 23 February 1983 (age 43)
- Place of birth: Ulan-Ude, Russian SFSR
- Height: 1.93 m (6 ft 4 in)
- Position: Defender

Youth career
- Trudovye Rezervy-RIPO Minsk

Senior career*
Years	Team	Apps	(Gls)
2001	Trudovye Rezervy-RIPO Minsk	23	(6)
2002–2010	Partizan Minsk	78	(7)
2003–2004	→ Kommunalnik Slonim (loan)	20	(0)
2010	Rudensk	11	(1)
2011	Olimpia Elbląg	0	(0)
2011–2012	Slavia Mozyr	11	(0)
2012	Smorgon	13	(2)
2013	Khimik Svetlogorsk	0	(0)
2015	Uzda	9	(0)

International career
2005	Belarus U21	7	(1)
- * Club domestic league appearances and goals

Alyaksandr Stashchanyuk (Belarusian: Аляксандр Сташчанюк; Russian: Александр Стащенюк; born 23 February 1983) is a Belarusian former professional footballer who played as a defender.

== Honours ==
MTZ-RIPO Minsk

- Belarusian Cup: 2004–05, 2007–08
