= Horbach (surname) =

Horbach is a surname. Notable people with the surname include:

- Andrey Horbach (born 1985), Belarusian footballer
- Anna-Halya Horbach (1924–2011), Ukrainian literary critic
- Annika Horbach (born 1994), German badminton player
- Ariane Horbach (born 1993), German cyclist
- Eugene Horbach (1926–2004), American real estate developer
- Ihor Horbach (born 1968), Ukrainian water polo player
- Ihor Horbach (footballer) (born 2004), Ukrainian footballer
- Lance Horbach (born 1958), American politician
- Maksim Horbach (born 1983), Belarusian footballer
