= Vital Tarashchyk =

Belarusian footballer

Personal information
- Date of birth: 18 May 1980 (age 46)
- Place of birth: Grodno, Byelorussian SSR, Soviet Union
- Height: 1.77 m (5 ft 9 1/2 in)
- Position: Midfielder

Team information
- Current team: Lida (head coach)

Youth career
- 1996–1999: Neman-Belcard Grodno

Senior career*
Years	Team	Apps	(Gls)
1996–2004	Neman Grodno	165	(23)
1996–1999	→ Neman-2 Grodno	30	(9)
2004–2006	MTZ-RIPO Minsk	58	(7)
2007	Gomel	24	(0)
2008–2010	Naftan Novopolotsk	53	(1)
2011	Dnepr Mogilev	25	(1)
2012–2013	Lida	50	(7)

International career
2000–2001	Belarus U21	6	(1)

Managerial career
- 2014–2015: Neman Grodno (reserves)
- 2016: Lida
- * Club domestic league appearances and goals as of 3 January 2014

Vital Tarashchyk (Belarusian: Віталь Тарашчык; Russian: Виталий Таращик; born 18 May 1980) is a retired Belarusian professional footballer. His latest club was Lida in 2013. In 2016, he worked as FC Lida head coach.

== Honours ==
MTZ-RIPO Minsk

- Belarusian Cup winner: 2004–05

Naftan Novopolotsk

- Belarusian Cup winner: 2008–09
