= Modern Air Transport =

US supplemental air carrier (1946–1975)

IATA	ICAO	Call sign
-	KV	MODERN
- Founded: 1946; 80 years ago
- Ceased operations: 1975; 51 years ago
- Hubs: Miami International Airport; Newark Airport; Berlin-Tegel Airport
- Fleet size: 8 aircraft (8 Convair CV-990A) as of March 1974
- Destinations: worldwide
- Parent company: Gulf American Corp (1966–1969); GAC Corp (1969–1975)
- Headquarters: Newark Airport (1946–1964); Trenton Airport (1965–1966); Baltimore (1967); Miami International Airport (1967–1975)
- Key people: Warren Ashley; John B. Becker; Mort Beyer; William Clarke; Lou DeFreitas; Thomas M. Ferguson; William W. Fitzpatrick; Al Goldberg; Edwin A. Leiser; Vincent M. de Ceasare; John D. MacDonald; Jay McGlon; William Maier; William P. Malloy; Harold L. Neff Sr; Walter Potchad; Julius J. Rosen; James M. Browne; Alex K. Rozawick; Ralph Sacks; Sol Sandler; John Smith Jr; Anthony G. Viglass

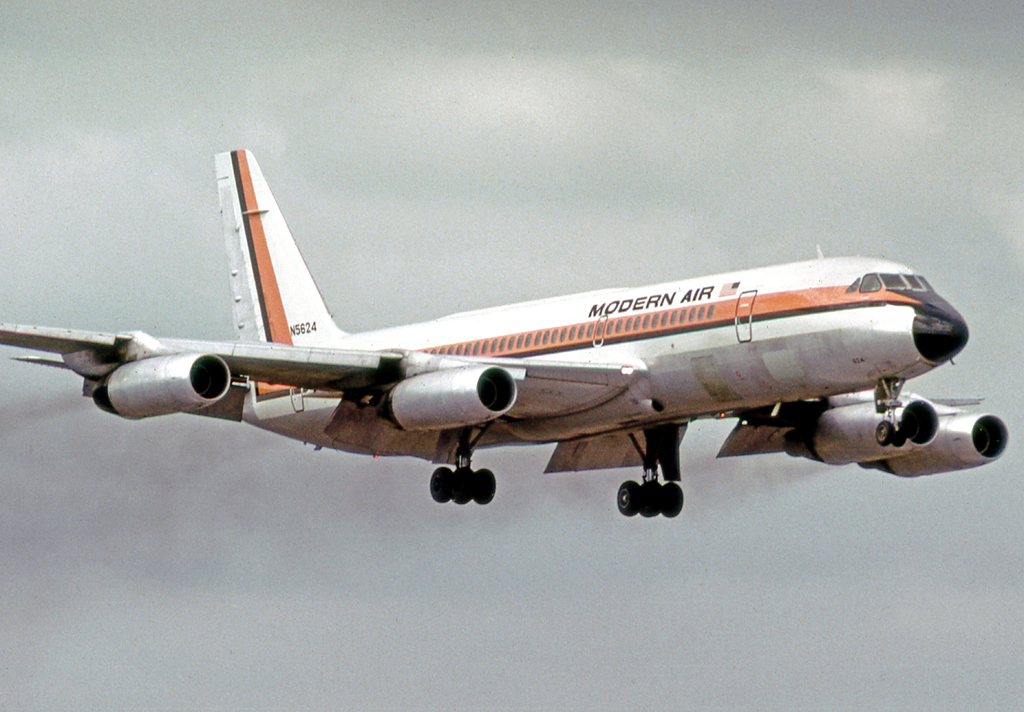
Convair 990A of Modern Air Transport landing at Miami

Modern Air Transport, Inc. (originally Modern Air Transport/MAT, subsequently Modern Air) was a United States-based supplemental air carrier (Note: From 1964, such airlines were charter carriers. Until 1964, they had a limited but flexible ability to fly scheduled service.) founded in 1946. At different stages in its history its operations were based in Newark and Trenton, New Jersey, Baltimore, and Miami. In addition to Miami, New York used to be a base for Modern Air. In 1968, the airline established an overseas base at Berlin Tegel Airport in what used to be West Berlin prior to German reunification. Between 1968 and 1974, operations increasingly focused on Berlin Tegel. Modern Air ceased trading in 1975.

== History ==
=== The early years ===
Although Modern Air was conceived in 1946 in Hempstead, Long Island, it was incorporated as Modern Air Transport, Inc. on January 3, 1947. Later that year, Modern Air commenced commercial operations from Miami International Airport with war-surplus Curtiss C-46 piston-engined aircraft.

In 1950, the airline's operational base moved to New York's Newark Airport. Following another move to Trenton–Mercer Airport, New Jersey shortly afterwards, the airline was bought by C-46 type-rated pilot, John B. Becker, in 1951.

In 1956, Modern Air became the first US "non-sked" to be granted rights for up to 10 regularly scheduled round trip flights per month by the Civil Aeronautics Board (CAB). Modern's first scheduled service departed Pittsburgh International Airport for Miami on July 15, 1956. The route was flown on week-ends at a one-way fare of $38.05 or, alternatively, a $60.75 16-day excursion fare.

From 1958, Gulf American Land Corporation, a Florida-based property developer, began contracting business to Modern Air. Gulf American Land, which had been formed to develop a tract of land in Cape Coral, Florida near Fort Myers into residential real estate, contracted the airline to fly hundreds of prospective customers for its real estate developments every week into Miami from the US Northeast and Midwest. At Miami, Gulf American Land's prospective customers transferred between Modern Air's Curtiss C-46s and the Douglas DC-3s of Gulf American Land's own airline, Gulf American Airlines, which operated a shuttle service linking Miami to Fort Myers across the Everglades. Together with complimentary bus transfers between Gulf American Land's Golden Gate Estates development in Cape Coral and Fort Myers' Page Field airport, these flights formed part of Gulf American Land's free sales pitch and were free for prospective customers, who were also served a free meal on board the aircraft on each leg of their journey.

Modern Air's charter flights on behalf of Gulf American Land into Miami eventually accounted for 25% of the airline's total business.

Five ex-Capital Airlines Lockheed L-049 Constellation piston airliners were bought in 1961 to replace the C-46s. These joined the fleet during summer 1962. Only two of these entered actual airline service; the remaining three were used for spares.

The grant of an interim certificate by the CAB in October 1962 to operate domestic military contract flights, intrastate and overseas charters from April 1, 1963, was followed by further fleet expansion, including the temporary lease of a pair of Lockheed L-1049 Super Constellations and the purchase of an L-749A in 1964.

The acquisition of five Douglas DC-7Cs in April/May 1965 resulted in retirement of the Constellation fleet due to the former's superior range. The same year also saw the acquisition of five DC-3s from Gulf American Airlines (for whom they continued to fly).

On May 30, 1966, the CAB authorised Modern Air to operate charter flights from the US to Canada and Mexico.

Further fleet expansion ensued in August 1966 with the acquisition of five Martin 2-0-2s from TWA and Allegheny Airlines, respectively. Also in 1966, the CAB broadened Modern's civilian and military charter authority, including granting the airline permission for limited scheduled air services. This enabled it to temporarily replace scheduled air services normally provided by major US certified route carriers during labour disputes resulting in strike action at the certified carriers and to obtain temporary CAB authority for scheduled flights from New York and Washington, D.C. to Miami.

Total revenues and profits for 1966 exceeded $4 million and $30,000, respectively.

=== The GAC era ===
Following Gulf American Land's purchase of Modern Air's entire stock from John Becker for $807,500 in May/June 1966, the airline became a wholly owned subsidiary of Gulf American Land Corporation on June 29, 1966. Concentration of most of Modern Air's business activities in Florida and the change in ownership resulted in consolidation of the airline's operations at Miami International Airport, (Note: apart from maintenance activities which remained at Trenton) the transfer of the DC-3s and Martinliners to sister airline Gulf American Airlines and the sale of the company's last remaining Constellation the following year. Gulf American Land Corporation's stockholder meeting in December 1966 resolved to shorten its name to Gulf American Corporation (GAC) to reflect its increasing diversification and approved an employee stock purchase plan worth $600,000.

Although Modern Air and Gulf American Airlines shared the same owners, who attempted to merge both airlines under the Modern Air name, both airlines largely remained organisationally independent of each other, with former Modern Air pilots continuing to fly the DC-7s on long-haul charters and their former Gulf American Airlines colleagues flying the smaller piston types (the DC-3s and Martinliners) into Fort Myers.

Gulf American's takeover by the General Acceptance Corporation in 1969 resulted in a major reorganisation of GAC's business units. This saw Gulf American Corporation and Modern Air become wholly owned subsidiaries of newly created holding company GAC Corporation, with all real estate related business activities being absorbed into newly formed GAC Corp subsidiary GAC Properties. These changes resulted in former GAC treasurer James M. Browne being appointed Modern Air president.

==== Transition to an all-jet fleet ====
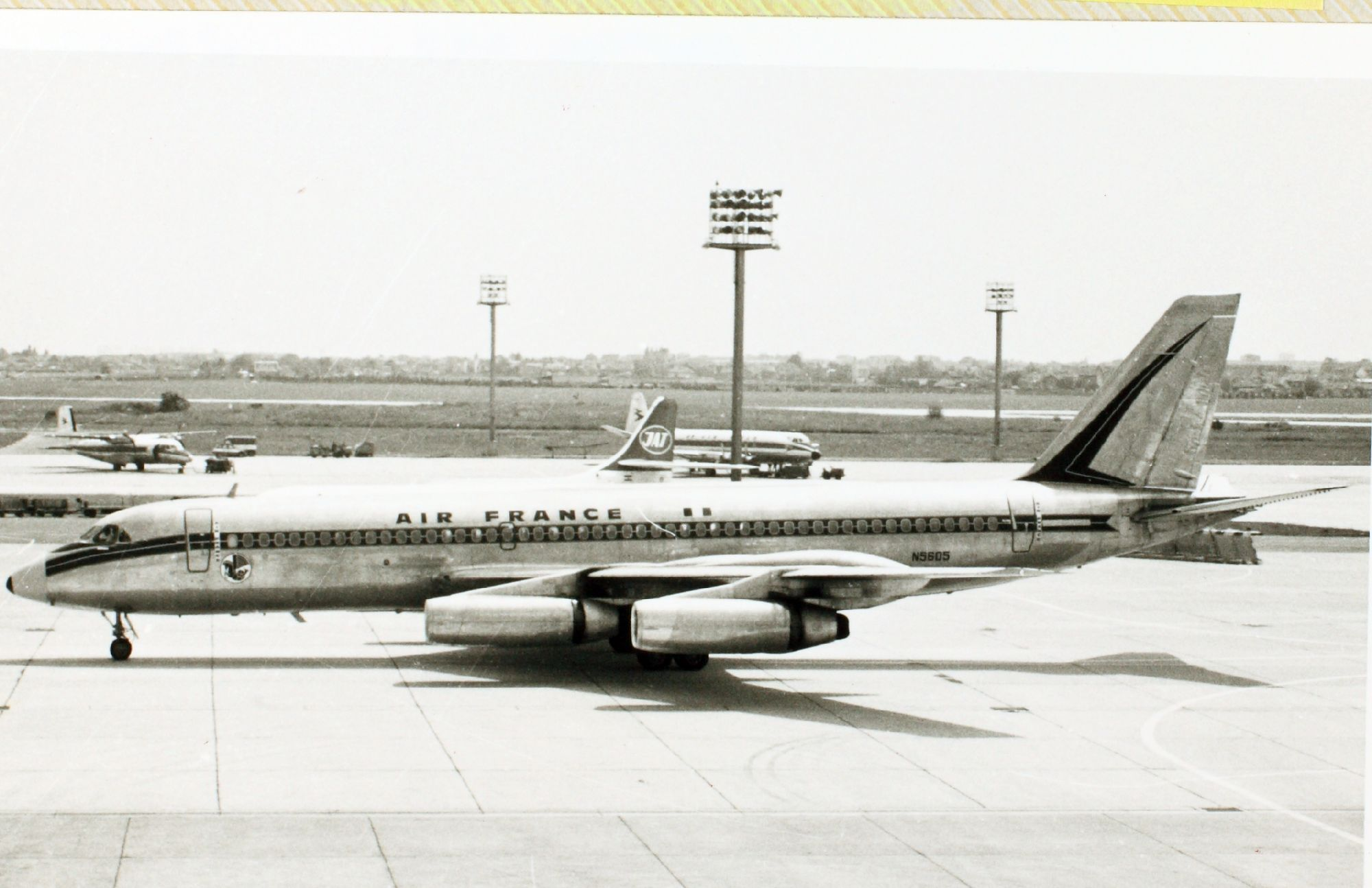
Air France wet-leased Convair 990 1967

The award of a five-year licence by the CAB in October 1966 to engage in cargo and passenger charter operations including all-expense tour charters between the US and points in Canada and Mexico enhanced Modern Air's new status as a permanently certificated US supplemental carrier. (Note: Modern Air was one of 10 US "non-skeds" attaining permanent supplemental carrier status at the time) Following the award of these new foreign charter rights, the airline concluded a US$17.5 million purchase agreement with American Airlines to acquire five of the latter's Convair CV-990A jetliners between January 1967 and February/March 1968, in anticipation of major growth for low-cost overseas travel by US tour groups. The first two examples sported a new natural metal "Silver Palace" livery, which replaced the Modern Air Transport/MAT fuselage titles used in previous schemes with Modern Air titles. Modern Air's first jet, Convair CV-990A N5609, was handed over to the airline in February 1967. It was based in Miami and contracted by GAC to operate charter flights for prospective investors in its real estate development projects in Florida and Arizona. Modern received its second CV-990A, N5605, the following month. This aircraft was repainted in the contemporary Air France livery, in preparation of a short-term wet lease beginning in April that enabled the French national airline to introduce high-capacity jet aircraft on four daily round trips between Paris Orly and London Heathrow while awaiting delivery of its own Boeing 727-200s. Modern Air's CV-990s were configured in a spacious 139-seat, single-class seating arrangement. The aircraft's standard flight deck crew complement comprised three, including a flight engineer holding a mechanic's and inspector's licence. On flights involving long overwater sectors a navigator supplied by a third party joined the other three flight deck crew.

The slow and difficult integration of the old Gulf American Airlines and pre-GAC Modern Air workforces into a combined post-merger workforce encountered a further obstacle when Modern Air hired former military pilots to crew its new jets. This resulted in the two separate, unionised legacy pilot groups, as well as another unionised group representing flight attendants across both airlines and pre-GAC Modern Air flight engineers being joined by another, non-unionised group. In addition, the airline's problems were compounded by reliability issues and high costs. It was at this point that GAC called on the services of experienced senior airline manager and aviation consultant, Morten Sternoff Beyer, to head up the airline and manage the integration as well as turn around its fortunes.

In addition to its new CV-990 jets, Modern Air also leased a pair of Boeing 727-100Cs from Executive Jet Aviation in September 1967 as DC-7 replacements and to enable eliminating the intermediate stop in Miami to change flights as the 727's short-field capability permitted direct flights into Fort Myers' original airport at Page Field from GAC's prospective customers' points of origin with a viable payload. It also began negotiations with Boeing for the purchase of a single 727-200 and two 727-100s direct from the manufacturer. Following a labour dispute with its pilots, new Executive Vice President Morten S. Beyer (who had arranged the 727 lease with Executive Jet) returned the leased Boeing jets, did not finalise its order with Boeing for three new-built 727s and began grounding all piston airliners permanently from the end of 1967. The latter move saw the DC-3s and DC-7s put into storage at Fort Myers while the Martinliners were stored at Cape May, New Jersey. It also resulted in 100 job losses among flight crew.

Modern Air carried more than 360,000 passengers in 1967 while revenues increased to over $9.5 million. However, costs associated with the transition to a jet fleet and excess capacity resulted in a $3 million loss (a $2.98 million operating loss and a $3.6 million net loss, respectively).

Disposal of the stored piston airliners proved more difficult and took longer than anticipated, especially of the four DC-7s. While two were partially cannibalised for spare parts, the remaining pair were put up for sale for $60,000 apiece. However, when these were eventually sold in 1969 to Miami-based Interair Parts for only $8,000, Modern Air was well into the jet era.

==== Diversification into new business areas and overseas expansion ====
The agreement with Air France for the temporary lease of one aircraft beginning in April 1967 provided additional work for the new jets.

Further work to increase the growing jet fleet's utilisation was secured when the Federal Government awarded Modern Air a contract to carry military personnel between camps in the US. However, this was insufficient to justify continuing expansion of the fleet and workforce. By the time Modern's third 990 was delivered, it experienced financial difficulties. This resulted in layoffs and management changes. As Modern Air was liable to pay substantial cancellation fees and would have forfeited the deposits that it had already paid for the outstanding aircraft deliveries if it terminated its purchase agreement with American Airlines unilaterally, Modern opted to begin looking for additional business opportunities to keep the expanding fleet fully employed.

As a result of a narrow Soviet interpretation of the Potsdam Agreement between the United States, the United Kingdom and the Soviet Union, access to West Berlin by air was restricted to three 10,000 ft (3,000 m) high and 20 mi (32 km)-wide air corridors, for exclusive use by aircraft under the control of individuals and (where applicable) organisations from the United States, the United Kingdom and France, the three Western victorious powers of World War II. These three air routes existed from February 1946 until German reunification in October 1990. They linked the exclave of West Berlin with West Germany and passed over the territory of communist East Germany. The airspace they encompassed was jointly administered from the Berlin Air Safety Center in West Berlin by representatives of the governments of all four victorious powers that had defeated Germany in World War II. (Note: including the Soviet Union)

The massive post-war reconstruction effort in West Berlin, the city's rapid economic recovery following the end of the Berlin Blockade and the beginning of the German economic miracle resulted in rapidly rising living standards and disposable incomes of the local population. Together with the lifting of travel restrictions imposed by other countries on West German passport holders in the immediate aftermath of World War II and West Berlin's location inside East Germany this in turn drove the local population's rapidly rising demand for overseas travel and the growing popularity of package tours involving air travel. As West Berlin was out of bounds for German airlines, local tour operators chartered aircraft of the British independent (Note: independent from government-owned corporations) airlines and US supplemental carriers that began flying from the city's Tempelhof and Tegel airports in the early 1960s.

Prior to Modern Air's arrival in Berlin, the biggest among these was US supplemental Saturn Airways. Saturn opened a base at West Berlin's Tempelhof Airport in 1964. Its Berlin-based fleet comprised Douglas DC-6 and DC-7 piston airliners, which were chartered by Flug-Union Berlin for its flying programme to several airports serving popular holiday resorts, chiefly in the Mediterranean. Flug-Union Berlin was the first tour operator with a West Berlin flying programme and acted at the time as the city's consolidator for the big West German tour companies Neckermann (then part of the eponymous mail order chain) and Touristik Union International (TUI), the travel arm of the mining company Preussag. (Note: Flug-Union Berlin became a tour operator in its own right, when it launched its first dedicated package tour flight programme with British independent Laker Airways from Tegel Airport in August 1968) Local rival tour operator Berliner Flugring, which had begun as a consortium of 70 local travel agents arranging inclusive tour (IT) flights from West Berlin to holiday resorts in Europe, also chartered Saturn's (as well as a number of different British independent airlines') aircraft for its flying programme. When some British independent rivals in West Berlin began replacing their piston and turboprop planes with jets such as the BAC One-Eleven and de Havilland Comet 4 from the mid-1960s, Saturn's piston airliners became obsolete. To remain competitive and to defend its market leadership in the West Berlin air charter market, it needed to re-equip with jets as well. Although it had already ordered the Douglas DC-8 Super 60 series and would operate the Boeing 707 as well, these were long-range aircraft unsuited to taking off from and landing on Tempelhof's short runways (as well as short runways at some overseas destination airports) with a viable payload. They were also unsuitable for the short- and medium-haul flights that dominated West Berlin charter flying and had too many seats to fill for most of the routes served by West Berlin charter aircraft. To match the superior performance of British competitors' jets and to exceed their passenger comfort, Saturn had no option but to acquire a dedicated fleet of short-/medium-haul jets, such as the Boeing 727, Boeing 737 or Douglas DC-9 for its West Berlin operation. However, following a change in Saturn's ownership, the new management decided to close the airline's Tempelhof base in 1967.

Although Saturn's contemporary British competitors in the West Berlin charter market moved quickly to fill the void left by the US supplemental's departure from Berlin, Saturn's former Tempelhof station manager, John D. MacDonald, was keen to re-establish a local US charter presence. This resulted in John MacDonald contacting rival supplemental Modern Air, who were looking for additional work for their recently acquired CV-990 jets, and using his local contacts with Flug-Union Berlin and Berliner Flugring to assist Modern with securing sufficient work to open a base in Berlin.

Ensuing negotiations with Berliner Flugring to operate a $3.5 million, West Berlin based programme, (Note: envisaging the carriage of 90,000 passengers on 670 short- and medium-haul IT charter flights to 16 destinations, mainly in the Mediterranean) as well as a similar $2 million programme with Flug-Union Berlin and a $1.5 million, seven months wet lease of up to two aircraft to Canadian charter carrier Nordair, enabled Modern Air to utilize its spare aircraft capacity.

By the time Modern Air assumed Berliner Flugring's flying programme, the latter had become the city's foremost package tour operator. The two West Berlin charter flight programmes the American supplemental operated under contract to Berliner Flugring and Flug-Union Berlin accounted for approximately 500 round trips during its first summer season in West Berlin. The decision to supply whole-plane charter airline seats to both of the city's leading package tour operators also enabled Modern Air to take advantage of rules permitting regular charter flights from West Berlin all year round. This was more liberal than in the US, where restrictive rules governed non-scheduled air services as part of an effort by the CAB to protect the country's scheduled airlines.

To enable Modern Air to operate its new CV-990s into Fort Myers Page Field with a viable payload, GAC agreed to co-finance the lengthening of one of its runways, which until then had been limited to revenue flights with jet aircraft no bigger than the Boeing 727-100. As a result, the airline operated its first CV-990 revenue flight, which was chartered by GAC Properties to carry 134 prospective land buyers from Sioux City, Iowa into Page Field on February 1, 1968 (before proceeding to Kansas City, Missouri and Lincoln, Nebraska to return with another load of prospective buyers to Fort Myers Page Field).

By 1968, Modern Air operated an all-jet fleet comprising five CV-990s. The acquisition of a further two CV-990s from American Airlines at the end of 1970 expanded Modern's 990 fleet to seven aircraft. This allowed it to vie with Swissair for the title of the world's largest Convair 990 operator. The final enlargement of Modern's CV-990 fleet occurred in 1972, when it acquired former Brazilian flag carrier VARIG's final two examples. This brought the airline's 990 fleet to nine, briefly allowing it to assume the title of the world's largest Convair 990 operator. (Note: the title of the world's largest CV-990 operator was subsequently assumed by Spanish charter airline Spantax, whose fleet eventually comprised 14 examples) The expanded all-jet fleet facilitated the introduction of regular tour group charters carrying American tourists from the Miami and New York areas to popular holiday resorts in North and Central America, as well as the launch in May 1968 of a Canadian-based Caribbean and transatlantic charter programme, (Note: involving the lease of an aircraft operated by Modern Air flight deck crews and Nordair cabin staff in the latter's livery carrying 20,000 passengers from Montréal to 17 Caribbean and European destinations) in addition to operating a large German charter programme. Eventually, all three US-based Modern Air CV-990s were allocated to the Canadian transatlantic charter programme, which Modern Air operated for Nordair under a wet lease arrangement (until 1970, when the Government of Canada revoked Nordair's permission to subcontract transatlantic flights to foreign airlines). At least two of these aircraft wore the full Nordair livery.

In 1968, Modern Air increased revenues by 20% to over $11.5 million (compared with 1967), while significantly reducing losses (a $1.3 million operating loss and a $2.4 million net loss, respectively).

Modern Air's expanding jet operations also led to further development in the airline's maintenance capabilities, as a result of the takeover of aircraft maintenance and conversion specialist, American Airmotive. This included one of Miami International Airport's biggest aircraft hangars and an aircraft maintenance base. Together with the earlier acquisition of the entire CV-990 spares inventory and engine tooling equipment, it helped the airline reduce its maintenance costs and improve the reliability of its fleet by enabling it to perform most maintenance tasks in-house.

===== Establishment and growth of West Berlin operation =====
In March 1968, Modern Air stationed two CV-990 jets at West Berlin's Tegel Airport. These were the biggest and fastest aircraft based at any Berlin airport at that time. Modern's new base employed 120. Apart from the flight deck personnel (who were required to hold US, British or French passports under West Berlin commercial air transport regulations), all were local. The latter included locally based, all-female cabin crew, who were known as "tiger girls" because of their distinctive yellow-and-black striped uniforms.

While all Modern Air commercial flights from and to Berlin principally used Tegel to take advantage of the airport's longer runways and the fact that it was not in a built-up area making for easier approaches (compared with nearby Tempelhof), the airline conducted its training for Berlin-based flight deck crews at Tempelhof. The latter was also the designated diversion airport in bad weather in the Tegel area. The establishment of Modern Air's Berlin base also enabled it to provide aircraft ground handling, maintenance and catering services to third parties, including Air France and Pan American World Airways (Pan Am).

As Modern Air's West Berlin charter permit did not authorise the carriage of cargo, the airline's Berlin management decided to utilise the only lightly filled cargo holds of its Tegel-based CV-990s to carry inbound catering and essential spares and tooling, including a spare tyre. The reason for carrying catering destined for passengers booked on return flights all the way from Berlin rather than appointing local suppliers at destination airports was that it worked out cheaper and was deemed more reliable and safer (compared with relying on overseas suppliers with varying quality and hygiene standards and who often plied their trade only seasonally) while the reason for carrying essential spares and tooling on outbound aircraft was to ensure emergency serviceability at destination airports lacking CV-990 spares inventories, given the type's narrow operator base (compared with the then ubiquitous Boeing and Douglas types and other popular contemporary aircraft types).

Modern's two Berlin-based Convair jets flew to 19 destinations from Tegel Airport during their first summer season, which lasted from May to September. The successful conclusion of Modern's first summer season in Berlin saw one aircraft speculatively retained for the winter season to develop a new charter programme to the Canary Islands, a first in the West Berlin market.

Modern Air appointed former Saturn Airways Berlin station manager John D. MacDonald general manager to oversee its European operations from its Tegel base.

Modern Air carried over 135,000 passengers (out of a company-wide total of just under 300,000) during its first year of operations from Tegel.

The successful conclusion of Modern Air's first and promising start to its second year in West Berlin resulted in the airline signing a five-year contract with Berliner Flugring worth $20 million (£8.3 million). The contract ran from the beginning of the 1969/70 winter season until the end of the 1974 summer season.

Berliner Flugring began referring to business partner Modern Air's CV-990s as Coronados (Note: named after the resort Coronado, California) in its marketing. This was the nickname pioneered by Swiss flag carrier Swissair, the type's first operator in Europe.

Modern Air's five-year contract with Berliner Flugring and an expanded US-based flying programme under contract to parent GAC that saw prospective homeowners flown into Tucson, Arizona from May 1969 to view the new Rio Rico property development near Nogales significantly improved aircraft utilisation.

Also in 1969, Modern Air's Tegel-based European operations manager John MacDonald assumed additional responsibilities as the airline's vice president. In addition, the airline sold a CV-990 to Spantax (which was replaced with another example acquired from Alaska Airlines in December) and began installing a then new type of light-weight, UK-manufactured "slimline" seat in its 990s. This enabled the addition of two extra rows, without compromising legroom. The resulting increase in capacity to 149 passengers per plane resulted in an up to 20% improvement in seat-mile cost (compared with American's original 125-seat, low density configuration) and helped improve the airline's financial performance. Modern Air also reduced the CV-990's speed limit from Mach .85 to Mach .78. This reduced fuel burn by 30% per hour and had the beneficial side effect of increasing the aircraft's range by 20% (by reducing drag), permitting non-stop transatlantic flights from the eastern seaboard of the US to Central Europe, such as Philadelphia to Vienna for example, with a full payload.

While Modern's 990s were more expensive to operate than the dedicated short-/medium-haul jets of their British rivals in West Berlin due to higher fuel consumption and had more seats to fill, the airline compensated for these disadvantages with its single type fleet. This resulted in cost savings compared with mixed type fleet rivals. In addition, in the pre-1973 oil crisis era of low fuel prices, the relatively low acquisition costs of these well-maintained, older generation second-hand jets partially compensated for the superior economics of comparable, contemporary new-built, state-of-the-art jet aircraft such as the Boeing 727. Moreover, the 990's ability to carry a similar number of passengers as the 727 over greater distances made it more versatile and resulted in greater operational flexibility.

Berliner Flugring's ability to avail itself of an aircraft capable of non-stop long-haul missions and offer its package tour customers greater legroom on board Modern Air's aircraft than competitors that contracted their flying programmes from West Berlin to various British charter airlines were important differentiators for the American supplemental's main business partner. Emphasising in its marketing the superior comfort and speed of Modern's 990s, as well as the fact that it was West Berlin's only tour operator exclusively using four-engined aircraft to fly its customers on holiday, enabled Berliner Flugring to gain an important competitive advantage over its rivals.

In addition to the city's established tour operators such as Berliner Flugring, which provided Modern Air with the bulk of its business out of West Berlin, Modern Air also attracted business from smaller local startups and other operators catering to a more cost-conscious clientele by offering lower rates for midweek and night flying. In addition to smaller local tour companies, the local organisers of VFR flights back home for West Berlin's large Turkish migrant population contracted their business to Modern Air to take advantage of lower rates at less popular times. This in turn enabled the airline to generate more business outside the Friday to Sunday peak, with the aim of smoothing peaks and troughs in activity.

The total number of passengers carried company-wide in 1969 rose to just under 330,000 while revenues totalled over $14 million and losses stood at more than $980,000 (operating) and over $1.8 million (net), respectively.

Following the write-off of the ex-Alaska CV-990, as a result of the aircraft's involvement in a landing accident in Acapulco in early-August 1970, another example was acquired from American Airlines as a replacement later that year. The total number of passengers carried that year increased marginally to just under 340,000 while there was a slight decrease in total revenues to below $14 million, mainly as a result of the termination of the Nordair wet lease.

As the company's flying programme from Berlin gradually expanded, additional aircraft joined the Berlin-based fleet. By 1971, the 25th anniversary of the airline's formation, five CV-990s were stationed at Tegel Airport year-round (along with most of the airline's employees). This equalled the total number of aircraft Modern Air's three main contemporary competitors in the West Berlin air charter market, the UK independent airlines Laker Airways, Dan-Air and Channel Airways, stationed at Tegel Airport, making the US supplemental the city's leading charter airline at the time. The decision to base most of its aircraft away from the US was taken in response to the disappointing financial performance of US-based operations. This contrasted with good financial results achieved by the growing operation in Berlin, which had effectively subsidised the shrinking US operation for a number of years. The additional Berlin-based aircraft and personnel also enabled Modern Air to supplement its regular charter programme from Berlin with one-off luxury charters to far-flung, exotic destinations, such as Bangkok, Colombo, Hong Kong, Johannesburg, Karachi and Mauritius. To maximise the CV-990's range, as well as to provide an enhanced level of passenger comfort, these flights had their usual Modern Air charter airline seats replaced with the original American Airlines first class seats and carried a bigger crew complement.

Another change in management at Modern Air's parent company resulted in the adoption of a new strategy for the airline. This entailed focusing all commercial activities on West Berlin from the beginning of the 1972 summer season to eliminate persistent losses incurred by Modern's US operations, which had consisted of contract flights taking prospective buyers from the US Northeast and Midwest to GAC Properties' real estate developments in Florida and Arizona, charter flights operating under contract to US-based tour operators ASTI and Berry to Mexico, the Caribbean and Central America from New York and Kansas City respectively, as well as extensive military charters carrying reservists within the US.

Under the stewardship of Modern Air's newly appointed president, (Note: replacing Mort Beyer, who had been appointed Modern Air president only the year before) Thomas Ferguson, the airline's entire fleet was stationed at Tegel Airport from May 1972. This move resulted in 250 job losses in the Miami area and the concentration of most of Modern Air's remaining 297 employees in West Berlin. The increase in Modern's Berlin-based fleet resulted in a huge influx of capacity into the West Berlin charter market, where it faced stiff competition from UK rivals Laker Airways and Dan-Air. At the time, Laker's and Dan-Air's Tegel-based fleets mainly comprised BAC One-Eleven twinjets. These aircraft were better suited to short- and medium-haul Mediterranean flying that accounted for most package tour flights from West Berlin and had fewer seats in a tighter seating configuration than the US supplemental's four-engined Convair jets. This made the UK independents' aircraft more economical for the bulk of West Berlin charter flying and enabled them to undercut its American rival. In addition, the much closer proximity of the UK independent airlines' main operating bases at London Gatwick Airport and Luton Airport to West Berlin's Tegel Airport (compared with Modern Air's distant Miami base) enabled Modern's West Berlin rivals to dispense with keeping expensive and unproductive spare aircraft and associated personnel in Berlin as replacements could be flown in at short notice. This, as well as their diverse fleets comprising a number of different short-, medium- and long-haul narrow-body and wide-body aircraft, also enabled Modern's rivals to respond more flexibly and cost-effectively to seasonal peaks and troughs in demand.

Modern Air's management sought to counteract the advantages British competitors enjoyed in the West Berlin charter market by partnering long-standing business partner Berliner Flugring in launching the city's first regular, all year round long-haul charter flight programme. It was thought that, in addition to picking up some of the lucrative contracts for an extensive short-/medium-haul West Berlin charter flight programme from Tegel Airport a consortium of three West German tour operators had awarded to defunct British rival Channel Airways in September 1970 (beginning in March 1971), this would provide sufficient utilisation for the airline's additional Berlin-based aircraft and enable it to obtain better rates than in the city's heavily contested short-/medium-haul charter market. This in turn would allow Berliner Flugring to further differentiate itself from rivals and enable it to charge its customers a premium for a new, unique and superior product. However, this was dependent on regulatory approval by the Allied Air Attachés in Bonn (Note: in the Cold War era the American, British and French embassies in West Germany's capital Bonn each had a military attaché attached, who was dealing with commercial aviation matters in West Berlin; the three Allied Air Attachés jointly exercised sole responsibility for commercial aviation in West Berlin on behalf of the governments of the United States, the United Kingdom and France during this period) and the aviation authorities of destination countries. However, as a result of pressure exerted by Pan Am, British European Airways (BEA) and Air France on the Allied Air Attachés, as well as objections lodged by the destination countries' national airlines with their aviation authorities, the relevant approvals were withheld. The established airlines viewed Modern Air's plans as a backdoor route to the scheduled air market. They feared that granting permission to a non-member of the International Air Transport Association (IATA) outside the relevant intergovernmental, bilateral air transport agreements would set a precedent for other non-IATA members to bypass regulatory restrictions in contemporary bilateral air transport agreements that limited access to scheduled air services and encourage circumvention of IATA fare rules by non-members.

A second attempt by Modern Air and Berliner Flugring to gain approval for their planned year-round long-haul charter programme sought to address the established airlines' concerns by teaming up with Swiss flag carrier Swissair, whereby Modern Air would fly partner Berliner Flugring's long-haul package tour customers between Berlin Tegel and Swissair's Zürich Airport base at a minimum frequency of two round trips per week to enable convenient transfers to and from Swissair's global network. However, this revised plan still met with objections from Pan Am, BEA and Air France, who viewed Swissair's support for it as an attempt to divert long-haul passengers on to the Swiss airline's network by using Modern Air's proposed Tegel–Zürich flights as a feeder. The Allied Air Attachés upheld the objections of West Berlin's three main scheduled airlines by ruling that combining charter and scheduled flights in a package was impermissible. As a result of these rulings, despite increasing the total number of passengers carried in 1972 to just under 400,000 and growing total revenues to $15.6 million, Modern Air was unable to expand profitably in West Berlin and recorded a loss for the year (a $2.42 million operating loss and a $4.14 million net loss, respectively).

In addition, to Modern Air's abortive attempts to launch a regular, year-round long-haul charter programme from West Berlin in partnership with Berliner Flugring, the airline and its long-standing business partner also attempted for a number of years to gain all necessary approvals for West Berlin's first-ever charter flight to Moscow as part of a one-off, all-inclusive city break package in the Soviet capital. Modern Air's management hoped to be able to build on its earlier success of 1968, when interventions at the highest level of the US government with its Soviet counterpart had resulted in Modern Air becoming the first US non-scheduled airline to be given permission at short notice to fly a US charter party to Moscow for a brief stopover on its first transpolar flight ("Polar Byrd I"). In addition to being a test of the limits of East-West cooperation in the then prevailing political climate of Détente (which aimed to create a more stable and predictable political environment by easing Cold War tensions), it was thought that this would be a major publicity coup for the airline and help it to raise its public profile further. Despite appearing cooperative initially, the Soviet authorities imposed increasingly onerous conditions on the airline and tour operator for the programme to go ahead. These ultimately proved unworkable and forced its abandonment. Similar to the case of the Bulgarian communist authorities' sudden and unexplained withdrawal of landing and overflight rights for flights originating/terminating in West Berlin (despite the much-needed hard currency Bulgaria earned from air navigation fees and airport user charges paid by the American and British airlines that operated these flights), some Western political observers at the time suspected behind-the-scenes East German lobbying of its Warsaw Pact ally and chief political backer respectively to have caused this to ensure East Germany's political and economic interests were not ignored in its Cold war allies' interactions with the West, especially where these concerned relations with West Berlin.

===== Entering West Berlin executive charter and scheduled markets =====
At its Berlin base, Modern Air also experimented with executive charter and scheduled services.

Modern Air first applied for scheduled service rights between West Berlin and West Germany, as well as major European cities that could not be accessed by scheduled flights from West Berlin at the time, in 1969. Unlike West Berlin's established scheduled airlines, Modern Air promised to operate its planned scheduled services without subsidies on the internal German routes for which it was applying and, where it was planning to compete with existing operators, to undercut existing scheduled air fares by up to 50%. Its application initially focused on the Berlin–Saarbrücken route, which was not served by any of the city's established scheduled operators. Although the business community in both locations supported Modern's application, West Berlin's established airlines opposed it. Pan Am's opposition to Modern Air's plans was particularly fierce. As a consequence of a general slowdown in global air traffic growth and committing to a large number of Boeing 747s that proved difficult to fill profitably, it had fallen into loss. The only profitable part of Pan Am's worldwide scheduled operation was its Internal German Services (IGS) division.

Although Modern Air's application for scheduled rights between Berlin and Saarbrücken was outside the CAB's regulatory scope as the route did not touch the US or its dependent territories, Pan Am began a major lobbying campaign in Washington, D.C. that aimed to thwart any future attempts by Modern Air and other US supplementals to apply to the CAB for permanent scheduled service authority.

Pan Am's opposition to Modern Air's Tegel–Saarbrücken scheduled service application focused on the US supplemental's alleged lack of scheduled service experience, limited operational experience in the West Berlin air corridors and insufficient spare capacity (in terms of both aircraft and personnel) to cope with unforeseen disruptions. Pan Am claimed that this could result in an unreliable service and potentially endanger passengers' safety. It also warned that having to compete with Modern Air in addition to government-owned and -subsidised BEA and Air France in West Berlin's crowded scheduled air market could threaten the IGS routes' viability and force it to shut down its operations in Berlin.

A single 12-seater HFB 320 Hansa Jet was acquired in 1970 as an air taxi to serve destinations not accessible by scheduled flights from West Berlin at the time. The arrival of Modern Air's Hansa Jet at its Tegel base marked the first appearance of a German-built aircraft at the airport since the end of World War II.

Having overcome Pan Am's opposition, Modern Air eventually launched thrice-daily Tegel–Saarbrücken flights with its 12-seater Hansa Jet in May 1971, marking the airline's scheduled debut.

As a result of the Hansa Jet's poor economics in scheduled airline service and a steady increase in passenger loads, Modern Air applied to the Allied Air Attachés for permission to operate two daily rotations with larger CV-990s. However, the Allied Air Attachés refused this under pressure from both Pan Am and BEA, West Berlin's leading contemporary scheduled airlines. Having had its application to introduce larger equipment on this route turned down, Modern Air withdrew all Tegel–Saarbrücken flights in November 1971. Pan Am's takeover of Modern Air's Saarbrücken route in February 1972, which entailed serving it from the former's base at the rival Tempelhof Airport with 128-seat Boeing 727-100s, was followed by the airline's unexpected suspension of Tempelhof–Saarbrücken services after less than a year's operation, citing insufficient demand. This turn of events resulted in Modern Air applying for permission to re-enter the Berlin–Saarbrücken scheduled market with two daily return flights using CV-990s. Permission for Modern Air to resume its Tegel–Saarbrücken route was granted in time for a summer 1973 re-launch. As a result, the CV-990 became the largest contemporary aircraft type to operate a scheduled service into Saarbrücken's small airport.

Several fare increases and the recession following in the wake of the 1973 oil crisis resulted in much reduced demand for air travel in the Berlin–Saarbrücken market. This in turn necessitated a major reduction in frequency to just two round trips per week.

These events, as well as the fact that the CV-990 was far too big and consumed too much fuel to serve a regional scheduled route economically, ultimately put paid to the firm's scheduled ambitions.

==== Deteriorating business environment ====
The setbacks Modern Air had suffered in 1972 and the CAB's displeasure at its management's decision to end all US operations necessitated a partial reversal of the previous strategy to focus all activities on West Berlin. This entailed a reduction in the Berlin-based workforce and the return of three of eight aircraft to the US at the end of that year's summer season in November, in preparation for the resumption of limited charter services from the New York area in 1973.

The resumption of US-based flying featured a series of charters from New York to Miami, Las Vegas, Los Angeles and Mexico City as well as entry of the US cargo charter market for the first time. However, startup costs associated with these flights (in addition to significant restructuring costs) meant that Modern Air remained unprofitable in 1973, when it recorded a $1.86 million operating loss and a $3.22 million net loss, respectively, despite total revenues reaching an all-time high of $25.06 million, increasing the total number of passengers carried to more than 490,000 and flying 13,000 freight tonne-kilometres (FTKs).

Steeply rising jet fuel prices in the aftermath of the 1973 oil crisis and Modern Air's reliance on the fuel-thirsty CV-990 had caused a significant increase in its operating costs. This was of particular importance for its operations from and to West Berlin as under Allied air navigation rules aircraft were only permitted to fly at a height of 10,000 ft (3,000 m) while passing through the Allied air corridors over East Germany, a sub-optimal, fuel-inefficient cruising altitude for modern jet aircraft. A plan to cut costs by further densifying the seating on its 990s to 179, which would have been achieved by converting the aircraft's seating arrangement from five to six abreast and resulted in narrowing the aisle to only 16 inches, was rejected by tour operators.

GAC cancelled its contract with Modern Air to fly in prospective land buyers from the US Northeast and Midwest to inspect its property developments in various locations in Florida and Arizona at the end of 1973, as a result of its dwindling property business. For the airline this was a major loss of a steady source of income.

The unexpected decision by the Greek government to close its airspace to all overflights from and to Turkey during the main European summer holiday season in August 1974 following the Turkish invasion of Cyprus on July 20, 1974, compounded Modern Air's problems as this compelled all airlines flying between Northern Europe and Turkey to use Bulgarian airspace instead. At the time, Bulgaria's then communist government banned all aircraft whose flights had originated or were going to terminate at a West Berlin airport from its airspace. This required all airlines flying between West Berlin and Turkey to make a technical stop en route at another airport outside West Berlin to make it appear to the Bulgarian authorities that these flights did not originate/terminate in West Berlin. This in turn significantly added to operating costs, which Modern Air (and rival airlines) found difficult to pass on in a highly price-sensitive market. It therefore undermined the viability of migrant charter flights between West Berlin and Turkey, especially when operated with fuel-inefficient aircraft such as Modern's CV-990s.

To recoup its sharply higher fuel costs in the Berlin market, the airline imposed a fuel surcharge on all tour operators that had contracted their flying programme from Berlin to it. The operators passed on this fuel surcharge to their IT passengers. A major disagreement over the fuel surcharge between Modern Air's management and its counterpart at Berliner Flugring, its main overseas business partner, led to a reduction in the Berlin-based fleet from five to four aircraft for the 1974 summer season. There was a plan to replace the fuel-guzzling CV-990s with more efficient, second-hand McDonnell Douglas DC-8s and DC-9s in time for the 1975 summer season. However, an attempt on Modern Air's part to pass on a further increase in its fuel surcharge to Berliner Flugring for the planned 1974/75 winter flying programme resulted in the tour operator's refusal to renew its long-standing charter contract with the airline. This in turn resulted in the closure of Modern Air's Berlin Tegel base at the end of October 1974. The airline had carried over two million passengers during its seven-year presence in West Berlin, which roughly equated to the city's contemporary population.

Nineteen seventy-four was Modern Air's last full year of operation, during which it recorded a $4.17 million operating loss and an $8.98 million net loss, respectively, while the total number of passengers carried decreased by 17.3% to just over 400,000 and FTKs collapsed by 46.2% to a mere 7,000 (compared with 1973). Modern's poor financial performance in 1974 was the worst among all US supplementals at the time. It was also a case of the smallest airline in this category recording the biggest loss.

==== Business closure ====
Having carried the airline's losses since 1967 and failed to secure a buyer for the entire business, GAC refused to invest any further in its airline subsidiary and instructed the airline's management to wind down operations and begin disposing of its fleet in 1975. This resulted in the sale of three CV-990s. It also resulted in a labour dispute that saw the airline's last remaining seven pilots walk out on September 1 after abandoning the last two active CV-990s (out of a remaining airworthy fleet of five) at New York JFK and Chicago O'Hare, respectively. All remaining airworthy aircraft were parked at various US airports pending their eventual disposal. The last example was parked at Miami's Opa Locka Airport shortly before Modern Air ceased operations on October 6, 1975, in response to the CAB's decision to ground the airline, as a consequence of the regulator's unhappiness over GAC's refusal to commit new funds to the business (after filing for Chapter 11 bankruptcy protection earlier that year). In addition, the CAB ordered it to surrender its operating permit the following month (with effect from November 20). Its West Berlin traffic rights were acquired by Aeroamerica, another US charter and supplemental carrier. Denver-based travel club and charter airline Ports of Call acquired most of the erstwhile Modern Air fleet. Four CV-990As saw active service with Ports of Call while a further two were cannibalised. Other former Modern Air CV-990As were acquired by Detroit-based Nomads air travel club and the National Aeronautics and Space Administration (NASA). The aircraft acquired by NASA was used on the Space Shuttle programme as a landing systems research aircraft.

In March 1977, the CAB granted Seattle-based real estate developer Eugene Horbach permission to acquire the remaining assets of bankrupt Modern Air (including the rights to the name). Horbach proceeded to transfer these to a new company named Modern Airways, Inc.. However, this company never became operational.

==== Causes of demise ====
While higher fuel consumption of Modern Air's all-CV-990 mainline fleet (compared with most other contemporary jet aircraft types operated by rival airlines) was the primary cause that led to its demise in the post-1973 oil crisis environment of high fuel prices, there were other important, longer term underlying factors that predated this era and which contributed to the airline's downfall.

The most important amongst these included

- the regulatory environment and
- the owners' attitude towards their airline.

As far as the former was concerned, compliance with contemporary regulatory restrictions on its operations in both the US and West Berlin, which were aimed at protecting bigger, established rival airlines, denied Modern Air access to potentially lucrative business opportunities that could have helped it to grow its presence in these markets as well as its economies of scale to enable it to spread its overheads over a greater level of activity.

Regarding the latter, GAC's owners' view of their airline subsidiary as an adjunct to their property business rather than a profit centre in its own right resulted in failure to invest in the airline adequately. This in turn prevented the mainline fleet to grow beyond eight aircraft and left Modern Air a subscale business compared with rivals. In this context, in the pre-1973 oil crisis era of low fuel prices, Mort Beyer always regarded Modern Air's CV-990s more capable than some rival US supplementals' early model DC-8s or the elderly Comets that still formed a major part of some British rivals' fleets and which competed with Modern's 990s out of West Berlin. But in order for Modern Air to fully leverage the cost advantage of operating a single type fleet comprising CV-990s or later model DC-8s vis-à-vis its competitors and to achieve sustained profitability, it would have needed a homogeneous fleet of approximately 20 aircraft.

=== Memorable one-offs ===
==== Bosom Bird ====
The operation of a special, one-off Busenvogel (Note: the German term for Bosom Bird) charter excursion from Tegel to Paris to celebrate Father's Day in June 1970, during which topless (Note: dressed in transparent bodices) showgirls from West Berlin's Daily Girl Club assisted four flight attendants in serving champagne to a group of 110 passengers (107 male, three female), gained Modern Air notoriety. It was organised by John MacDonald, who had been promoted to the role of Modern's Berlin-based Vice President Europe by the time. However, MacDonald acted on his own, without informing Beyer or obtaining the GAC board's prior approval. Despite succeeding in raising the airline's public profile by gaining free worldwide publicity courtesy of the global media's attention, this did not go down well with GAC's owners. Mindful of their main business unit GAC Properties' predominantly older, socially conservative clientele, they did not wish to be associated with such stunts and the controversy generated in many parts of the world. GAC's owners' displeasure at their airline's senior management's failure to uphold its values resulted in Beyer and MacDonald being summoned to GAC's headquarters in Florida, where they were reprimanded for their conduct and where it was made clear to them that their future employment with Modern Air depended on there being no repetition.

==== Transpolar flights ====
Modern Air operated two round-the-world transpolar luxury charter flights in 1968 (Note: billed at the time as "the first commercial flight ever to cross both poles and touch down on all continents") and 1970.

===== Polar Byrd I =====
On November 22, 1968, the first of these saw CV-990A N5612 Polar Byrd I, which had a special Polar Path Compass (PPC) system fitted for the polar trip, (Note: by Modern's electronics department headed up by Vincent de Ceasare) become the first commercial jetliner to land on and take off from the 10,000 feet (3,000 m) ice runway at the McMurdo Station airfield at Williams Field, McMurdo Sound in Antarctica. This flight commemorated the 40th anniversary of Admiral Richard Byrd's South Pole flight.

The special commemorative flight was arranged by Edward C. Bursk, chairman of the Admiral Richard E. Byrd polar research centre in Boston and editor of the Harvard Business Review. He offered 400 wealthy US businessmen the chance to make history by joining this unique mission in support of his fund raising exercise for the Byrd Center. Eventually, 70 US businessmen took up Bursk's offer. They paid $10,000 each to partake in the special, round-the-world trip over both Poles.

Flight KV 907 departed Boston on November 8, 1968, with 70 passengers and 10 crew on board. Modern Air's chief pilot (and former Air Force One pilot), Harold L. Neff was in command. The passengers were seated four abreast (two on each side of the aisle) in the former American Airlines first class seats, which Modern Air had acquired together with the aircraft from the US major and which had replaced the aircraft's usual, five-abreast, slimline charter seating configuration for this trip. Cdr F.G. Dustin, who had accompanied [then Cdr] Byrd on his second Antarctic expedition in 1934, was among the passengers. The flight routed over the North Pole via Greenland, Alaska, the Philippines, Japan, Australia and New Zealand to Antarctica, where it made the historic landing at McMurdo Sound. From there it routed over the South Pole, before crossing the International Date Line a second time and proceeding northwards to southern Argentina, Brazil, West Africa and Europe. Rome was the first European stop, from where the flight continued to Moscow via Copenhagen (where an Aeroflot navigator joined the flight deck (Note: a precondition for granting Modern Air permission to enter Soviet airspace)), before night-stopping in London and returning to Boston the following day, December 3, 1968.

The en route stop in Moscow also made Modern Air the first US commercial airline to operate a charter flight to the erstwhile Soviet Union.

Modern Air's historic arrival in Moscow was memorable for a different reason as well. In common with other contemporary jet aircraft types, such as the Boeing 707/720, deHavilland Comet, Douglas DC-8, Sud Aviation Caravelle and Vickers VC-10, Convair's 880/990 lacked an auxiliary power unit (APU). This made the Convair jets dependent on an external ground power unit (GPU) to provide electrical power for the aircraft while stationary on the ground, including starting the engines. When Polar Byrd I needed power externally supplied by a GPU to start its engines at the end of the stopover in Moscow to resume its journey, it was found that the Soviet GPUs could not be connected to the CV-990s air intake valve due to an incompatibility between the ground equipment's fittings and the aircraft's valve. This necessitated flying in a Modern Air GPU from West Berlin and resulted in the delay of the onward flight. It also resulted in a subsequent collaboration between Modern Air's maintenance department and Garrett AiResearch to design and test a CV-990 APU, which was located in a hollow area behind the fuel tank inside the aircraft's inboard anti-shock body on the starboard wing. This however proved unsuccessful, resulting in the unit's removal after the first installation.

The Byrd Center kept half of the $700,000 it had raised for its historic round-the-world transpolar trip, which cost $250,000 to organise. This left Modern Air with a profit of $100,000.

===== Polar Bird II =====
Modern Air's second round-the-world transpolar luxury charter flight was arranged by Hemphill World Cruises of Los Angeles. This time the flight was operated by CV-990A N5615 Polar Bird II, which departed Los Angeles International Airport in early December 1970 with 60 wealthy, elderly passengers with an average age of above 70 on board and Captain Ross Zimmermann in command. Unlike Modern's first transpolar flight, where all passengers were male, this flight had a mixed, male/female passenger complement. As on the first flight two years earlier, former American Airlines first-class seats (configured four-abreast) replaced the usual slimline charter seats (configured five-abreast). However, unlike in 1968, there was also a lounge in the aircraft's forward fuselage.

Similar to the pattern established in 1968, the flight routed over the North Pole (via Anchorage) before heading for Europe, Africa, South Asia and the South Pacific, where a stopover on Easter Island enabled passengers and crew to disembark and tour the island before proceeding to Santiago de Chile and Punta Arenas. Apart from there being far fewer en route stops (compared with 1968), the main difference between the Polarbyrd I and Polarbird II flights was that landing on McMurdo Station airfield's ice runway at the US Navy's Williams Field Antarctic research station in McMurdo Sound was no longer possible as the US Navy had begun restricting access to the airfield to essential flights only, in the wake of an incident two months earlier. This had resulted in a US Navy Constellation on a non-essential flight with 80 passengers and crew on board crash landing there in a snowstorm and stranding its passengers and crew for several days. As a result of this incident, the US Navy had also withdrawn refuelling facilities at the airfield, which made commercial airline operations impractical. A last-minute appeal at the highest level of the US government failed to reverse the US Navy's decision. As a consequence (as well as owing to bad weather in the area at the time), when the flight departed Punta Arenas on December 11 on the last leg of the trip (before returning to the US) the closest Polarbird II came to the original South Pole experience of Polarbyrd I back in 1968 was to offer its passengers a 4,000 mi (6,400 km) round trip within a 950 mi (1,530 km) radius of the South Pole with views of the Antarctic icecap.

== Aircraft operated ==
In its 29-year existence Modern Air operated the following aircraft types:

- Beechcraft Twin Bonanza
- Boeing 727-100C
- Convair CV-990A
- Curtiss C-46
- Douglas DC-3
- Douglas DC-7C Seven Seas
- HFB 320 Hansa Jet
- Lockheed L-049 Constellation
- Lockheed L-749A Constellation
- Lockheed L-1049 Super Constellation
- Martin 2-0-2.

== Fleet details ==
=== Fleet in 1967 ===
In November 1967, Modern Air's fleet comprised 16 piston airliners.

Modern Air fleet in November 1967
Aircraft	Number
Douglas DC-7C Seven Seas	5
Lockheed L-049 Constellation	1
Martin 2-0-2	5
Douglas DC-3	5
Total	16

Deliveries of five former American Airlines Convair CV-990As began in January 1967.

=== Fleet in 1972 ===
In May 1972, Modern Air's fleet comprised nine jet aircraft.

Modern Air fleet in May 1972
Aircraft	Number
Convair CV-990A	8
HFB 320 Hansa Jet	1
Total	9

300 people were employed.

== Accidents and incidents ==
On August 8 1970, ex-Alaska Convair CV-990A-30A-8 (Note: one of three originally built for VARIG) (registration N5603) undershot the runway at Acapulco's Álvarez Airport during a VOR/ILS approach at the end of a ferry/positioning flight that had originated in New York, where 102 charter passengers travelling on a package tour arranged by Asti Mexican Tours had boarded the aircraft for their flight to Mexico City Benito Juárez Airport. Having safely disembarked its passengers at their intended destination, the aircraft was then ferried with only the flight deck and cabin crew on board to Acapulco to pick up another load of 146 charter passengers booked with the same tour operator for their return flight to New York as contemporary Mexican rules governing tour groups visiting the country by air did not permit their arrival at and departure from the same airport. The night time approach to Acapulco Álvarez Airport in rainy and foggy weather resulted in the aircraft colliding with the airport's approach lights before touching down 300 feet (100 m) short of the runway, breaking up and catching fire. Initially, it was thought that this had resulted in the death of one of its cabin crew, who had remained unaccounted for during the rescue operation that had saved the other seven, badly injured crew members. When rescue workers returned to the crash site the following morning to retrieve the remains of the missing crew member, the unaccounted for crew member was found in the burnt-out tail section, still alive but seriously injured. After being rushed to the same hospital where the other seven crew members were receiving medical attention, all eight eventually made a full recovery.

On May 28 1971, one of Modern Air's Berlin-based CV-990As with 45 passengers on board en route from Berlin Tegel to Bulgaria was unexpectedly denied permission to enter Bulgarian airspace, as a result of a new policy adopted by that country's communist government to deny any aircraft whose flight had originated or was going to terminate at a West Berlin airport the right to take off and land at any of its airports. This resulted in the aircraft having to turn back to Berlin, where it landed safely at the city's Tegel Airport.

== See also ==
- Supplemental air carrier
- List of defunct airlines of the United States

== Notes and citations ==
Notes

Citations
