= LMN Architects =

Architecture firm

LMN

Practice information
- Founded: 1979
- Location: Seattle, Washington, United States
- Coordinates: 47.603733°N 122.334540°W

Significant works and honors
- Buildings: 4/C, 808 Howell Street, Expedia Building
- Awards: 2016 Architecture Firm Award from American Institute of Architects

Website
- lmnarchitects.com

LMN is an American architecture firm based in Seattle, Washington. The company was founded in 1979, and provides planning and design services to create convention centers, cultural arts venues, higher education facilities, commercial and mixed-use developments.

== History ==
LMN Architects was founded in 1979 as Loschky, Marquardt and Nesholm by George Henry Loschky (b. 1938), Judsen Robert Marquardt, and John Frank Nesholm (b. 1942), who had all worked for the Seattle architecture firm NBBJ. By 2005, Nesholm was the only remaining original partner, and by 2015, none of the original partners remained.

In 2005, LMN Partners included: John Nesholm, Chris Eseman, Walt Niehoff, Mark Reddington, Rob Widmeyer, and George Shaw; by 2008, Wendy Pautz had joined. By 2015, the partners had become: Shaw, Reddington, Widmeyer, Niehoff, Pautz, John Chau, Rafael Viñoly-Menendez, Sam Miller, and Stephen Van Dyck. By 2017, Widmeyer had left. As of March 2021, the partners consisted of Chau, Miller, Niehoff, Reddington, Shaw, Van Dyck, Viñoly-Menendez, Julie Adams, Osama Quotah, and Pamela Trevithick.

== Features ==
LMN projects have been published in "On the Right Track" in The Architect's Newspaper, as well as in "Vancouver Convention Centre Pushes Limit on Green Design," from Contract Design Magazine, "Advancing Data-Driven Approach to Architecture" in the Metropolis Magazine, and the Seattle Times article on the Seattle Public Library.

== Awards ==
The firm has received over 100 awards in the past 10 years. Most recently, LMN's work on the Vancouver Convention Centre West was awarded Sustainable Building of the Year from World Architecture News. The firm was also awarded 2012 Regional Firm of the Year by the American Institute of Architects (AIA) Northwest & Pacific Region as well as Chicago Athenaeum American Architecture award. A few other awards the firm has earned are:

- AIA National Cote Award for the Vancouver Convention Centre West
- Sustainable Architecture & Building Magazine Award of Sustainability
- Excellence in Construction Award for the Salem Conference Center
- International Illumination Design Award, Award of Merit for the Marion Oliver McCaw Hall
- Lumen West Award of Excellence for the Marion Oliver McCaw Hall

== Notable projects ==
- 2001: Washington State Convention Center expansion, Seattle, Washington
- 2007: Keegan Hall, Peninsula College, Port Angeles, Washington
- 2020: Seattle Asian Art Museum remodel and expansion, Seattle, Washington
