= Tower 333 =

20-story high-rise building in the central business district of Bellevue, Washington

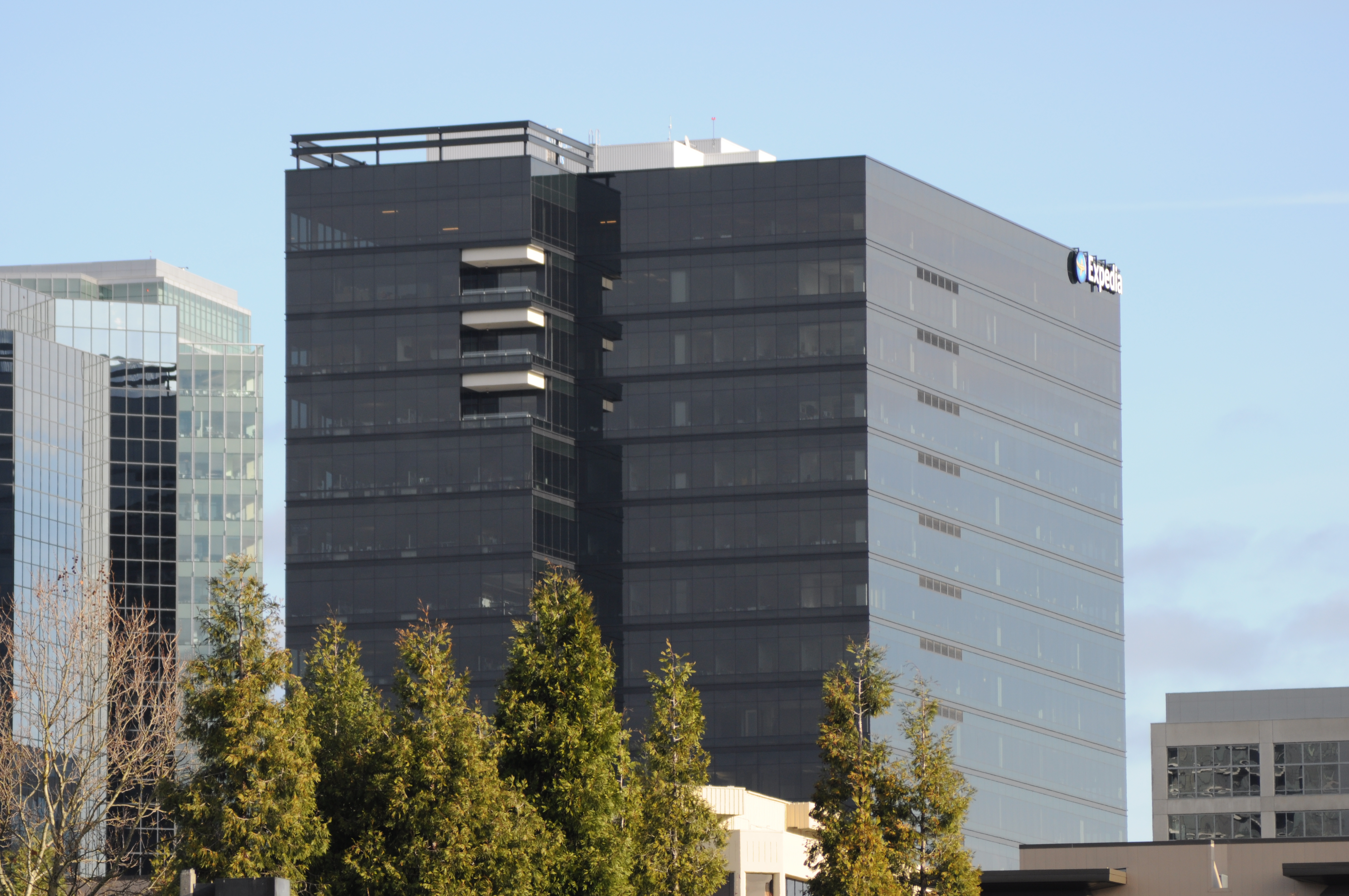
- Former names: Expedia Building
- Alternative names: Technology Tower

General information
- Type: office
- Location: 333 108 Avenue NE; Bellevue, Washington, U.S.
- Coordinates: 47°36′49″N 122°11′48″W
- Construction started: 2000
- Completed: 2008
- Cost: $100 million
- Owner: Equity Commonwealth

Height
- Roof: 272 ft (83 m)

Technical details
- Floor count: 20
- Floor area: 414,964 sq ft (38,551.4 m^{2})

Design and construction
- Architect: LMN Architects
- Main contractor: Lease Crutcher Lewis

Tower 333 is a 20-story high-rise office building in the central business district of Bellevue, Washington, United States. The building housed the corporate office of Expedia, Inc. from 2008 to 2019. Amazon is planned to take over the lease for the entire building in 2020.

== History ==
In October 1997, local developer Eugene Horbach proposed the design of the Bellevue Technology Tower as a 19-story building with 350,000 sq ft (33,000 m^{2}) of space. The project was one of several in Bellevue accompanying the dot-com boom of the late 1990s.

Ambitious plans and the collapse of the dot-com bubble led to severe financial difficulties and delays. In June 2002, Horbach's development partnership defaulted on $22 million in loans. Union pension funds that financed the tower took over ownership of the site. To save the property from foreclosure in September 2002, Horbach sold a 10-acre (4 ha) development site he had spent 17 years acquiring. Then Horbach died on January 1, 2004.

With the excavation and part of the underground parking garage already complete, the Seattle office of real estate company Hines and Washington Capital Management announced revised plans for the site in March 2006. The city discussed the possibility of mandating construction projects to be completed once commenced due to the delays.

In August 2006, it was rumored that Google would be leasing most of the building's office space. The building was scheduled for completion in October 2007, but was delayed when a fixed tower crane at the site collapsed in November 2006, killing one person in a neighboring apartment building. In June 2007, Expedia announced that it would lease 16 floors of the building. The company took over the tower's naming rights, renaming it to the Expedia Building.

In April 2015, Expedia announced plans to move to the former Amgen campus in Seattle's Interbay neighborhood. The Bellevue building will be leased to Amazon, who signed a long-term lease for all of the tower's office space in August 2018. Expedia moved from the tower in late 2019 and minor renovations began when Amazon's lease came into effect in January 2020; the company plans to move its first employees into the building in late 2020.

== Design ==
Tower 333 received Gold-level certification for Leadership in Energy and Environmental Design (LEED) Core & Shell from the U.S. Green Building Council. It was the first newly constructed office building in the city of Bellevue to achieve LEED Gold certification. The building was designed by LMN Architects of Seattle.
