= Aleksandr Gorbachyov =

Aleksandr Gorbachyov may refer to:

- Aleksandr Gorbachyov (footballer, born 1970), Russian football player and coach with FC KAMAZ, FC Dynamo Stavropol, FC Baltika, FC Fakel Voronezh and FC Elista
- Aleksandr Gorbachyov (footballer, born 1986), Russian footballer with FC SKA Rostov who played in Belarus and Finland
