= Gulf American Land Corporation =

Former land development company in Florida

- Industry: Real estate
- Founded: July 18, 1957; 69 years ago
- Founders: Leonard Rosen; Jack Rosen
- Defunct: February 24, 1969
- Fate: Acquired by General Acceptance Corporation
- Headquarters: Miami, Florida, United States
- Subsidiaries: Modern Air Transport (1966-1975)

Gulf American Land Corporation (GALC) was a land development company in Florida founded by brothers Leonard and Jack Rosen. During the late 1950s and 1960s, GALC was the largest land sales company in the United States. The company is noted for its role in the development of Cape Coral, and pioneering the sales method of installment land purchases.

In the late 1960s, GALC sold 173,000 mi (278,000 km) of swampland, dubbed Golden Gate Estates, to about 40,000 buyers. Many buyers bought plots that were submerged underwater. Gulf American built 183 mi (295 km) of roads and 813 mi (1,308 km) of flood control canals, advertising Golden Gate Estates as semi-improved land, though there were no public utilities or services. The fill resulting from the excavation of flood-control canals was used to raise the land level to meet legal requirements for minimum building elevation. The canals drain 233 billion US gal (880 billion L) of fresh water a year into Naples Bay, damaging the coastal saltwater ecology while causing the groundwater table to drop 2 ft (0.61 m) to 4 ft (1.2 m). The Florida Department of Business Regulation (FDBR) adopted real estate development reforms in the 1970s in response to such abuses.

In 1969, GALC (or Gulf American Corp) and its sister companies were taken over by General Acceptance Corporation.

== History ==
Leonard and Jack Rosen began their business career as street vendors in Baltimore. They used the earnings of their original business and high-interest loans advanced by Chicago financier Jay Pritzker to set up a real estate development company selling yet-to-be developed plots of land in northwest Florida Everglades to prospective homeowners from the Northeast and Midwest. This involved Rosen's 1957 purchase of 103 sq mi (270 km^{2}) of land located in mangrove swamps for $678,000 and the establishment of offices in strategically important Northeastern and Midwestern towns and cities, where prospective customers were enticed by using high-pressure sales techniques to take a day trip to Southwest Florida to inspect developments and commit to a purchase.

== Land development business ==
The Rosen's land purchase in November 1957 was followed by the start of construction in January 1958, and the first completed units were occupied by residents soon after. The same year, the Rosens also founded Gulf American Land Corporation (GALC).

GALC organized day trips for prospective customers using its airline, Gulf American Airlines, which operated a shuttle service linking Miami to Fort Myers Page Field with a fleet of five Douglas DC-3s. Page Field was the closest airport to GALC's Cape Coral residential development (which prospective customers accessed by complimentary bus transfers from the airport). From 1958, GALC also began contracting US supplemental carrier (Note: holder of supplemental air carrier certificate authorized to operate non-scheduled passenger and cargo services to supplement the scheduled operations of certificated route air carriers; an airline holding a supplemental air carrier certificate was also known as a "nonsked" in the US) Modern Air to fly prospective customers from the Northeast and Midwest into Miami International Airport, where they transferred between Modern Air's Curtiss C-46s and Gulf American Airlines' DC-3s en route to and from Fort Myers. These flights formed part of Gulf American Land's free sales pitch and were free for prospective customers, who were also served a free meal on board the aircraft on each leg of their journey. GALC's business accounted for 25% of Modern Air's total business.

To protect themselves against buyers attempting to wriggle out of the contractual terms of their purchase agreements with GALC following a sudden change of mind and potential defaulters, plots were oversold. Gulf American started getting complaints against their sales practices in the early 1960s. Governor Haydon Burns responded to this criticism by placing Leonard Rosen on Florida's Installment Land Sales Board, which was created to investigate these complaints.

On June 29, 1966, Modern Air became a subsidiary of GALC after purchasing the airline's entire participating interest from its previous owner, John Becker, for $807,500 in May-June 1966. GALC's acquisition of Modern Air resulted in the consolidation of the airline's operations at Miami International Airport (Note: apart from maintenance activities which remained at Trenton) and its merger with Gulf American Airlines.

In December 1966, GALC's stockholder meeting resolved to drop "Land" from its name, shortening it to Gulf American Corporation (GAC), to reflect its increasing diversification, and approved an employee stock purchase plan worth $600,000. GAC and Modern Air become subsidiaries of the newly created holding company GAC Corporation, with all real estate business absorbed into a new subsidiary called GAC Properties.

In 1967, the newly elected Governor Claude R. Kirk Jr. promised, "The era of 'let the buyer beware' is over. Let the unscrupulous seller beware." Kirk appointed a new seven-member Land Sales Board that took office on August 1. The Land Sales Board ordered Gulf American to show the board why Gulf American's registration certificate to sell land in Florida should not be revoked or suspended. As a result, the American Stock Exchange suspended all trading of Gulf American's stock. Gulf American would plead guilty to five charges of fraud or misleading practices in early November. Gulf American suspended all sales for 30 days. The court appointed five outsiders to monitor Gulf American for a probation period lasting 150 days, a $5,000 fine, and required them to issue refunds to buyers who had legitimate grievances. Less than a week later, Arizona's Santa Cruz County commission approved their Rio Rico development. In February 1968, Gulf American was sued for $4.14 million in total. Two separate Massachusetts corporations alleged that Gulf American misled them about the properties they purchased and failed to provide them with property reports. Another suit came from a Detroit couple who said salesmen misled them about their lot's location, saying it would be 2 1/2 city blocks from the Gulf of Mexico when it was 9 miles (14 km) away.

The company's financial status began to worsen in the late 1960s. According to Leonard Rosen, the Rosen's total accumulated net profit from property-related activities amounted to $100 million, while GAC's stock was valued at $150 million by the end of the 1960s. At some point, they would get involved in British Honduras, operating the subsidiary Collgerry Reality Inc. to manage their land acquisitions there.

== Sale of company ==
In 1969, the Rosen's sold GAC to General Acceptance Corporation for more than $200 million (equivalent to $1.76 billion in 2025), with Jack and Leonard Rosen each receiving a cash payment of $100,000, in addition to approximately $63 million worth of General Acceptance stock and dividend payments of $544,000 each year for the first three years and then $1.64 million every year. At the time of the acquisition they had 372,276 acres (1,506.55 km^{2}) of land with a 25% share in all Florida land sales. GAC had 95,102 acres (384.86 km^{2}) in British Honduras (later Belize), 65,680 acres (265.8 km^{2}) in Arizona, 51,000 acres (210 km^{2}) in New Mexico and 5,680 acres (23.0 km^{2}) in Utah.

General Acceptance Corp's origins go back to August 1933, when it was formed in Allentown, Pennsylvania. Initially focusing on car finance, General Acceptance branched out in the 1950s into insurance, consumer, and real estate finance, and later expanded into truck-trailer and construction-equipment manufacturing in the 1960s.

From May 1969, GAC Properties began organizing day trips for prospective customers to view its new Rio Rico property development near Nogales in conjunction with its Modern Air airline, flying them into Tucson, Arizona. Also in 1969, Jack Rosen died at the age of 50 in Miami, as a result of a heart attack.

GAC's dwindling property business in the wake of the recession caused by the 1973 oil crisis resulted in the cancellation of subsidiary Modern Air's contract to fly in prospective land buyers from the Northeast and Midwest to inspect its property developments in various locations in Florida and Arizona at the end of 1973. Rising interest rates increased GAC's borrowing costs and made it increasingly difficult to refinance the company's public debt. In addition, GAC's poor environmental record and controversial sales techniques attracted growing negative attention from authorities, consumers, environmental groups, and the general public. These factors combined to reduce residential development and to close or dispose of non-core activities, including GAC's computer leasing business and Modern Air. As a result, GAC entered Chapter 11 bankruptcy protection in 1975.

GAC emerged from bankruptcy protection in September 1980 as a subsidiary of Avatar Holdings, Inc. The real estate business accounted for 70% of its total revenues, with the remainder coming from water and wastewater utility services.

In 1987, Leonard Rosen died of natural causes in Las Vegas at the age of 72.

== See also ==
- General Development Corporation
