= Maksim Horbach =

Belarusian footballer

Personal information
- Date of birth: 14 September 1983 (age 43)
- Position: Midfielder

Senior career*
Years	Team	Apps	(Gls)
2001–2004	Kommunalnik Slonim	96	(3)
2005	Torpedo-SKA Minsk	26	(6)
2006–2007	Darida Minsk Raion	41	(5)
2008	Neman Grodno	15	(1)
2009	Dinamo Brest	0	(0)
2010	Partizan Minsk	9	(0)
2010	Rudensk	14	(1)
2011	SKVICH Minsk	30	(5)
2012	Vedrich-97 Rechitsa	2	(0)
2012	Isloch Minsk Raion	17	(0)
- * Club domestic league appearances and goals

Maksim Horbach (Belarusian: Максім Горбач; Russian: Максим Горбач; born 14 September 1983) is a retired Belarusian professional footballer.
