= Alyaksandr Vishnyakow =

Belarusian footballer

Personal information
- Date of birth: 8 May 1986 (age 40)
- Place of birth: Khabarovsk, Russian SFSR
- Height: 1.78 m (5 ft 10 in)
- Position: Forward

Youth career
- 2002–2005: BATE Borisov

Senior career*
Years	Team	Apps	(Gls)
2005–2007	BATE Borisov	21	(2)
2008	Naftan Novopolotsk	2	(0)

International career
2002	Belarus U17	3	(0)
2005	Belarus U21	3	(2)
- * Club domestic league appearances and goals as of 1 January 2009

Alyaksandr Vishnyakow (Belarusian: Аляксандр Вішнякоў; Russian: Александр Вишняков; born 8 May 1986) is a retired Belarusian footballer (forward). He ended his career at the age of 23 due to injuries. His last club was Naftan Novopolotsk.

== Honours ==
BATE Borisov

- Belarusian Premier League champion: 2007
- Belarusian Cup winner: 2005–06
