= Aleksei Martynov =

Russian footballer

Personal information
- Full name: Aleksei Vyacheslavovich Martynov
- Date of birth: 17 July 1978 (age 48)
- Place of birth: Omsk, Soviet Union
- Height: 1.85 m (6 ft 1 in)
- Position: Forward

Youth career
- 1997–1998: Dynamo Omsk

Senior career*
Years	Team	Apps	(Gls)
1997–1998	Dynamo Omsk	45	(12)
1998	Irtysh Omsk	9	(2)
1999	Dynamo Omsk	26	(5)
2000	Volgar-Gazprom Astrakhan	3	(0)
2000	Zvezda Irkutsk	12	(6)
2001	Volgar-Gazprom Astrakhan	9	(1)
2001	Lokomotiv Chita	17	(5)
2002–2003	Irtysh Omsk	45	(13)
2004	Lokomotiv Minsk	26	(19)
2005	Amur Blagoveshchensk	40	(13)
2006	Avangard Kursk	34	(7)
2007	Spartak Nalchik	2	(0)
2008	Dynamo Bryansk	6	(0)
2008–2010	Metallurg-Yenisey Krasnoyarsk	62	(19)
2011	Tyumen	11	(1)
2012–2013	Irtysh Omsk	19	(7)
- * Club domestic league appearances and goals

Aleksei Vyacheslavovich Martynov (Russian: Алексей Вячеславович Мартынов; born 17 July 1978) is a retired Russian professional footballer. He made his debut in the Russian Premier League in 2007 for PFC Spartak Nalchik.
