= Vitaliy Bondarev =

Ukrainian footballer

Personal information
- Date of birth: 15 June 1985 (age 41)
- Height: 1.78 m (5 ft 10 in)
- Position: Forward

Youth career
- 2000–2002: Illichivets Mariupol

Senior career*
Years	Team	Apps	(Gls)
2001–2003	Illichivets-2 Mariupol	7	(0)
2004–2009	Dnepr Mogilev	82	(30)
2010	Zirka Kirovohrad	4	(0)
- * Club domestic league appearances and goals

Vitaliy Bondarev (Ukrainian: Віталій Бондарев; born 15 June 1985) is a retired Ukrainian professional footballer.
