= Alyaksandr Baranaw =

Belarusian footballer

Personal information
- Date of birth: 27 November 1974 (age 51)
- Place of birth: Minsk, Byelorussian SSR, Soviet Union
- Height: 1.82 m (5 ft 11 1/2 in)
- Position: Midfielder

Senior career*
Years	Team	Apps	(Gls)
1992–1995	Stroitel Starye Dorogi	24	(0)
1992–1994	→ Zarya Yazyl (loan)	29	(10)
1995	Smena Minsk	10	(2)
1995	Volgar-Gazprom Astrakhan	6	(0)
1996–1999	BATE Borisov	99	(25)
2000	Rostselmash Rostov-on-Don	6	(0)
2000–2001	Lokomotiv Nizhny Novgorod	38	(0)
2002–2003	Darida Minsk Raion	45	(5)
2003–2004	Naftan Novopolotsk	37	(3)
2005	BATE Borisov	13	(1)
2006–2009	Smorgon	87	(6)
2010	Gorodeya	30	(9)

International career
1998–1999	Belarus U21	6	(0)

Managerial career
- 2011–: BATE Borisov (youth)
- * Club domestic league appearances and goals

Alyaksandr Baranaw (Belarusian: Аляксандр Баранаў; Russian: Александр Васильевич Баранов; born 27 November 1974) is a retired Belarusian professional footballer. He works as a youth coach with BATE Borisov.

== Career ==
Born in Minsk, Baranaw began playing football in Smena Minsk youth system. He played for FC Zarya Yazyl in the Second Division and joined Stroitel's senior team where he made his Belarusian Premier League debut in 1992. Baranaw would win the Premier League with FC BATE Borisov in 1999.

== Honours ==
- Belarusian Premier League champion: 1999.
