= Vasili Kuznetsov (footballer) =

Russian footballer and coach

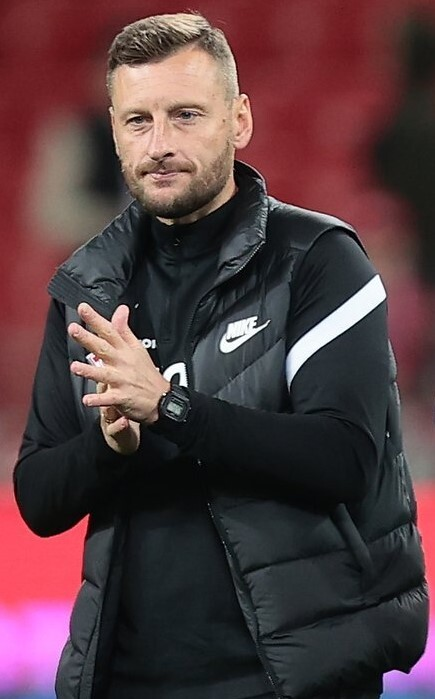
- Vasili Kuznetsov

Personal information
- Full name: Vasili Aleksandrovich Kuznetsov
- Date of birth: 24 August 1978 (age 48)
- Place of birth: Moscow, Russian SFSR
- Height: 1.86 m (6 ft 1 in)
- Position: Goalkeeper

Team information
- Current team: Chelyabinsk (GK coach)

Youth career
- Anderlecht

Senior career*
Years	Team	Apps	(Gls)
1997	CSKA-d Moscow	1	(0)
1998	Krasnoznamensk-Selyatino	28	(0)
1999	Yerevan	14	(0)
1999–2000	Krasnoznamensk	34	(0)
2001–2003	Chkalovets-1936 Novosibirsk	33	(0)
2004–2005	MTZ-RIPO Minsk	18	(0)
2006–2007	Gomel	39	(0)
2008	Dmitrov	9	(0)
2009	Zelenograd	14	(0)
2009	Neman Grodno	8	(0)
2010–2012	Istra	42	(0)

Managerial career
- 2013–2014: Strogino Moscow (assistant)
- 2014–2017: Spartak-2 Moscow (goalkeeper coach)
- 2017–2019: Russia U21 (goalkeeper coach)
- 2019–2021: Spartak Moscow (U20 goalkeeper coach)
- 2021–2022: Spartak-2 Moscow (goalkeeper coach)
- 2022–2023: Spartak Moscow (goalkeeper coach)
- 2023–2024: Veles Moscow (goalkeeper coach)
- 2025–: Chelyabinsk (goalkeeper coach)
- * Club domestic league appearances and goals

Vasili Aleksandrovich Kuznetsov (Russian: Василий Александрович Кузнецов; born 24 August 1978) is a Russian professional football coach and a former goalkeeper. He is the goalkeeper coach with Chelyabinsk.

== Honours ==
- Belarusian Premier League runner-up: 2007.
- Belarusian Premier League bronze: 2005.
