= Aleksandr Gorbachyov (footballer, born 1986) =

Russian footballer

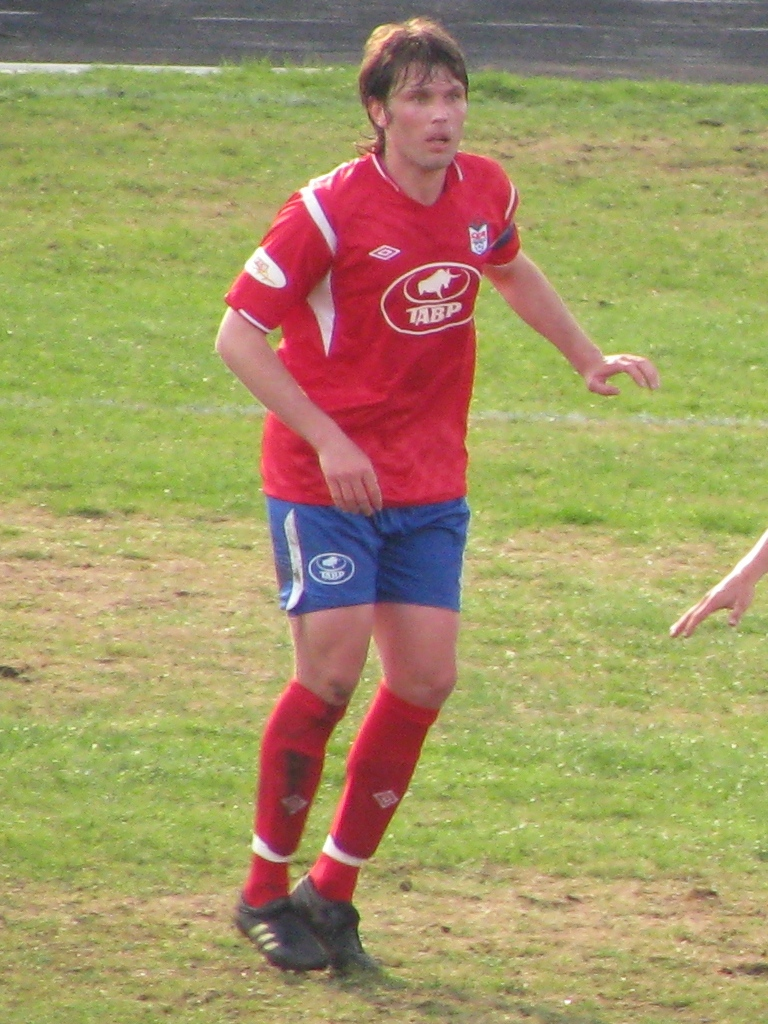

Personal information
- Full name: Aleksandr Valeryevich Gorbachyov
- Date of birth: 7 October 1986 (age 40)
- Place of birth: Rostov-on-Don, Russian SFSR
- Height: 1.91 m (6 ft 3 in)
- Position: Defender

Youth career
- 2003–2004: Rostov

Senior career*
Years	Team	Apps	(Gls)
2004	SKA Rostov	28	(0)
2005–2006	MTZ-RIPO Minsk	11	(1)
2008	Rakuunat		
2008	Oulu	6	(0)
2009–2012	SKA Rostov	71	(1)
- * Club domestic league appearances and goals

Aleksandr Valeryevich Gorbachyov (Russian: Александр Валерьевич Горбачёв; born 7 October 1986) is a Russian former professional footballer who played as a defender.
