= David Zoubek =

Czech footballer

Personal information
- Date of birth: 3 February 1974 (age 52)
- Place of birth: Prague, Czechoslovakia
- Height: 1.85 m (6 ft 1 in)
- Position: Midfielder

Senior career*
Years	Team	Apps	(Gls)
1995–2002	Hradec Králové	144	(10)
1996–1997	→ Pardubice (loan)	28	(5)
2003	Bohemians Praha	14	(1)
2003	Jokerit	13	(0)
2004–2005	Dinamo Minsk	38	(8)
2006–2009	Bohemians Praha (Střížkov)	129	(37)
2010	Kladno	13	(2)
- * Club domestic league appearances and goals

David Zoubek (born 3 February 1974) is a retired Czech football midfielder.
