= Oleg Radushko =

Belarusian footballer and coach

Personal information
- Date of birth: 10 January 1967 (age 59)
- Place of birth: Pinsk, Brest Oblast, Belarusian SSR, Soviet Union
- Height: 1.70 m (5 ft 7 in)
- Position: Midfielder

Youth career
- SDYuShOR-3 Pinsk

Senior career*
Years	Team	Apps	(Gls)
1985–1988	Dinamo Brest	82	(3)
1988	Dinamo Minsk	4	(0)
1989–1995	Dnepr Mogilev	218	(48)
1996	Kommunalnik Pinsk	8	(3)
1996–2004	Neman Grodno	175	(19)
Total		487	(73)

Managerial career
- 2005–2008: Neman Grodno (assistant)
- 2008–2010: Neman Grodno
- 2012–2013: Olimpia Elbląg
- 2016–2019: Gorodeya (assistant)
- 2019–2020: Gorodeya
- 2021–2023: Belarus (assistant)
- 2021: Belarus (caretaker)
- 2024–2025: Dnepr Mogilev
- * Club domestic league appearances and goals

Oleg Radushko (Belarusian: Алег Радушка; Russian: Олег Радушко; born 10 January 1967) is a Belarusian professional football coach and a former player.

== Managerial career ==
After retiring, Radushko worked as assistant coach at Neman Grodno. During 2019–2020 he managed Gorodeya.
