= Yawhen Kapaw =

Belarusian footballer

Personal information
- Date of birth: 30 January 1977 (age 49)
- Place of birth: Rahachow, Byelorussian SSR
- Height: 1.81 m (5 ft 11 1/2 in)
- Position: Defender

Senior career*
Years	Team	Apps	(Gls)
1993–2012	Dnepr Mogilev	442	(6)
1995–1999	→ Dnepr-2 Mogilev	13	(0)
2015	Dnepr Rogachev	4	(0)

International career
1999	Belarus U21	3	(0)
2001	Belarus B	2	(0)

Managerial career
- 2013–2018: Dnepr Mogilev (assistant)
- 2018–2019: Dnepr Mogilev (caretaker)
- 2019–2020: Dnyapro Mogilev (reserves)
- 2020–2025: Dnepr Mogilev (assistant)
- 2024: Dnepr Mogilev (caretaker)
- 2025: Dnepr Mogilev (caretaker)
- * Club domestic league appearances and goals

Yawhen Kapaw (Belarusian: Яўген Капаў; Russian: Евгений Капов, Yevgeny Kapov; born 30 January 1977) is a retired Belarusian professional footballer. He spent his entire playing career in Dnepr Mogilev, having been playing for them from 1993 till 2012. After retirement, he stayed in Dnepr as an assistant coach.

== Honours ==
Dnepr-Transmash Mogilev

- Belarusian Premier League champion: 1998
