= Eugene Horbach =

- Born: Eugene Horbach; June 27, 1926; Klicz, Poland
- Died: January 1, 2004 (aged 77)
- Resting place: Sunset Hills Memorial Park Bellevue, King County, Washington, USA
- Occupation: Real estate developer
- Known for: real estate and property development
- Spouse: Joyce Saari
- Children: 3
- Parent(s): Luba Horbach and Nikifore Horbach

Eugene Horbach (June 27, 1926 – January 1, 2004) was a real estate developer in the western United States from the 1960s to 2004.

== Early life ==
Horbach was born of Ukrainian stock in Klicz, Poland. He was the only child of Luba and Nikifore Horbach. Horbach was 12 years old at the onset of World War II. It has been reported that he spent years in either a refugee camp or a forced-labor camp. He graduated from the Technische Hochschule Darmstadt (today Technische Universität Darmstadt) in 1950 before moving to the United States and serving in the US Army for two years. Horbach then married Joyce Saari, and the couple moved to Bellevue, Washington, in 1953.

== Career ==
He began his career in the 1960s by founding E&H Properties and developing properties throughout the western United States. In the 1980s, Horbach and Seattle developer Michael R. Mastro built office buildings for Boeing in south King County, Washington. Mastro estimated that they sold between $250 million and $300 million to the company.

He was active in Bellevue as it grew during the 1990s. During the dot-com boom, he planned a mixed-use project over a multiple-acre superblock that he had spent 17 years acquiring. He also planned the state of the art Technology Tower. He experienced financial difficulties and his projects stalled with the collapse of the dot-com bubble. He sold most of the superblock to finance construction of the ailing Technology Tower and placed at least two properties in Salt Lake City in bankruptcy protection.

== Personal life ==
Horbach and his wife had two daughters and one son. He served as president of the local Ukrainian Trinity Orthodox Church, was a supporter of the Seattle Symphony and a benefactor of the Holy Rosary Catholic parish. He died at Seattle's Harborview Medical Center on January 1, 2004, from complications suffered after a fall.
