= FC Partizan Minsk =

Former football club in Minsk, Belarus

Partizan Minsk Partyzan Minsk
- Full name: Football Club Partizan Minsk
- Founded: 2002
- Dissolved: 2014
- Ground: SOK Olimpiysky, Minsk
- Capacity: 1,500
- League: Belarusian Second League
- 2014: 22nd
Home colours	Away colours

FC Partizan Minsk (also FK Partyzan Minsk, Belarusian: ФК Партызан Мінск) was a Belarusian football club based in Minsk.

== History ==
The old MTZ-RIPO logo.

The club was founded as FC MTZ-RIPO Minsk (MTZ-RIPA, Belarusian: МТЗ-РІПА) in 2002 as a merger of two Minsk teams from the Second League (Traktor Minsk, a club with a 55-year history, and Trudovye Rezervy-RIPO Minsk, a football academy-based team named after the Trudovye Rezervy which only spent one season in the Second League). The merge allowed the new team to have its own football school to recruit young players from, as well as financial support from the Minsk Tractor Works, the main sponsor of Traktor Minsk.

FC MTZ-RIPO Minsk started playing in the Second League in 2002. In their first season the team finished first, and then did the same in the First League in 2003. Since 2004, they played in the Belarusian Premier League.

At the end of 2004 the club was acquired by a Russian-Lithuanian businessman Vladimir Romanov and became a part of his football holding alongside Scottish Premier League club Hearts and Lithuanian A Lyga club FBK Kaunas. During 2005–2010 many foreign players owned by FBK Kaunas or Hearts had successful loan spells in MTZ-RIPO.

Before the start of the 2010 season, the club announced a name change. On 27 January 2010, the new name was revealed to be Partizan Minsk.

Partizan finished the 2010 season at bottom of the table and were relegated. In the following season in the Belarusian First League, they finished second and had to face FC Vitebsk in a two-legged play-off, which they won 3–2 on aggregate to secure a place in the 2012 Belarusian Premier League.

In early 2012, the club was mostly abandoned by Romanov (who withdrew his financial support, having some legal troubles himself) and had to release all its players. Partizan withdrew from the Premier League, leaving the division with only 11 teams. The team spent the 2012 season playing at the amateur level in the Minsk Championship. In 2013, the club renamed to Partizan-MTZ Minsk and joined the Second League, before renaming back to Partizan Minsk in 2014. Midway through the 2014 season, the club announced its withdrawal from the league and was folded. The club was succeeded by Traktor Minsk who re-founded in 2015.

== Honours ==
- Belarusian Premier League
  - Third place (2): 2005, 2008
- Belarusian Cup
  - Winners (2): 2005, 2008

== Supporters ==
The club had a fierce rivalry with Dinamo Minsk. The support across the two Minsk clubs was drawn across political lines, with Dinamo fans being strongly right-wing and Partizan fans being strongly left-wing. Partizan fans were known for their anarchist, anti-government, anti-fascist, and pro-LGBT rights stances. As a result of their political views, they had strong friendships with the fans of Arsenal Kyiv, SV Babelsberg, and Original 21.

== Former managers ==
- Andrei Zygmantovich
- Eduard Malofeev
- Yuri Puntus
- Alexandr Piskarev

== League and Cup history ==
Season	Level	Pos	Pld	W	D	L	Goals	Points	Domestic Cup	Notes
2002	3rd	1	24	22	2	0	102–21	68		Promoted
2003	2nd	2	31^{1}	22	4	5	64–17	70	Round of 32	Promoted
2004	1st	14	31^{2}	7	9	15	36–57	30	Round of 16	
2005	1st	3	26	16	1	9	43–30	49	Winners	
2006	1st	4	26	16	3	7	54–24	51	Round of 16	
2007	1st	5	26	11	9	6	32–25	42	Quarter-finals	
2008	1st	3	30	17	6	7	65–37	57	Winners	
2009	1st	11	26	8	6	12	34–38	30	Quarter-finals	
2010	1st	12	33	5	8	20	24–70	23	Quarter-finals	Relegated
2011	2nd	2	30	20	5	5	59–26	65	Quarter-finals	
2011	2nd	1	2	1	0	1	3–2	3		Promotion Play-off
2012	4th	5	14	6	4	4	17–17	22		Promoted
2013	3rd	11	24	5	7	12	26-46	22		

- ^{1} Including additional game (1–2 loss) against Lokomotiv Vitebsk for the 1st place.
- ^{2} Including additional game (4–1 win) against Lokomotiv Vitebsk for the 14th place.

== MTZ-RIPO in Europe ==
Season	Competition	Round		Club	1st Leg	2nd Leg
2005–06	UEFA Cup	1Q	(Hungary)	Ferencváros	2–0 (A)	1–2 (H)
2005–06	UEFA Cup	2Q	(Czech Republic)	Teplice	1–1 (H)	1–2 (A)
2006	UEFA Intertoto Cup	1R	(Kazakhstan)	Shakhter Karagandy	5–1 (A)	1–3 (H)
2006	UEFA Intertoto Cup	2R	(Russia)	Moscow	0–2 (A)	0–1 (H)
2008–09	UEFA Cup	1Q	(Slovakia)	Žilina	2–2 (H)	0–1 (A)
2009–10	UEFA Europa League	1Q	(Montenegro)	Sutjeska Nikšić	1–1 (A)	2–1(aet) (H)
2009–10	UEFA Europa League	2Q	(Ukraine)	Metalurh Donetsk	0–3 (A)	1–2 (H)
