= 2005–06 Belarusian Cup =

Tournament details
- Country: Belarus
- Teams: 46

Final positions
- Champions: BATE Borisov (1st title)
- Runners-up: Shakhtyor Soligorsk

Tournament statistics
- Matches played: 51
- Goals scored: 149 (2.92 per match)
- Top goal scorer(s): Raman Vasilyuk (6 goals)

The 2005–06 Belarusian Cup was the 15th edition of the football knock-out competition in Belarus.

Contrary to the league season, the competition has been conducted in a fall-spring rhythm. The first games were played on 14 June 2005 and the final on 27 May 2006. BATE Borisov won the Cup.

== First round ==
13 teams from the Second League, all 16 teams from the First League and 3 amateur clubs started competition in this round. The games were played on 14 and 15 June 2005.

14 June 2005	Pinema Pinsk (A)	0–1	Smena Minsk (II)	Pinsk
			Rylinski 56'	Attendance: 800; Referee: Dmitry Abushkevich (Mogilev)

15 June 2005	Khimik Grodno (A)	2–4	Khimik Svetlogorsk (II)	Grodno
	Kotin 32'; Yatsevich 79'		Gavrilovich 51', 58', 59'; Alhavik 67'	Attendance: 200; Referee: Leonid Loznyukha (Minsk)

15 June 2005	Pinsk-900 (III)	1–3	Baranovichi (II)	Pinsk
	Lutsevich 62'		Shupilov 39' (pen.); Mitsevich 44' (pen.); Zhdanovich 54'	Attendance: 1,000; Referee: Sergey Sakharevich (Grodno)

15 June 2005	Spartak Shklov (III)	1–1 (a.e.t.) (4–3 p)	Belshina Bobruisk (II)	Shklov
	Prontishev 33'		Shukelovich 83'	Attendance: 1,500; Referee: Aleksandr Braichevskiy (Orsha)

15 June 2005	Livadiya Dzerzhinsk (III)	0–2	Torpedo-Kadino Mogilev (II)	Dzerzhinsk
			Milto 42'; Syrokvashko 84'	Attendance: 1,500; Referee: Yury Fomin (Volkovysk)

15 June 2005	Molodechno (III)	1–7	Smorgon (II)	Molodechno
	Mikheyev 81'		Tsybul 15', 46', 62'; Dorokhovich 21', 23'; Kiturko 82'; Yarosh 86'	Attendance: 100; Referee: Igor Romanov (Mozyr)

15 June 2005	Kommunalnik Zhlobin (III)	0–3	Lida (II)	Zhlobin
			Zhukowski 57' (pen.); Tretyak 77', 87'	Attendance: 1,500; Referee: Vyacheslav Kolochinsky (Mogilev)

15 June 2005	Neman Mosty (III)	0–2	Orsha (II)	Mosty
			Khorbin 60'; Aleshchanka 79'	Attendance: 300; Referee: Valery Kuntsevich (Minsk)

15 June 2005	Osipovichi (III)	1–3	Vedrich-97 Rechitsa (II)	Osipovichi
	Azyava 40' (pen.)		Dimitrov 24', 32'; Malyavko 77'	Attendance: 800; Referee: Vitaly Sevostyanik (Grodno)

15 June 2005	Gomel-SDYuShOR-8 (III)	2–3	Bereza (II)	Gomel
	Sigay 59'; E.Demenkovets 90' (pen.)		Nesterovich 4' (pen.), 32', 51'	Attendance: 100; Referee: Gennadiy Zverok (Minsk)

15 June 2005	Polesye Kozenki (III)	0–3	Veras Nesvizh (II)	Kozenki
			Andreyenko 12'; Grinevich 70'; Lyavitski 88'	Attendance: 100; Referee: Sergey Tsinkevich (Osipovichi)

15 June 2005	DUSSh Kirovsk (A)	2–1	Dnepr-DUSSh-1 Rogachev (II)	Kirovsk
	Ivchenko 69'; Matveyev 82'		Tsikhamiraw 88'	Attendance: 800; Referee: Viktor Verbitsky (Kobrin)

15 June 2005	Polotsk (III)	2–1	ZLiN Gomel (II)	Polotsk
	Gorokhovsky 53'; Strelkov 63'		Pokatashkin 90+3'	Attendance: 2,500; Referee: Sergey Tsybulskiy (Smolevichi)

15 June 2005	Vertikal Kalinkovichi (III)	0–2	Kommunalnik Slonim (II)	Kalinkovichi
			Zyulew 31', 60'	Attendance: 1,100; Referee: Nikita Pyreyev (Minsk)

15 June 2005	Gorki (III)	0–0 (a.e.t.) (5–3 p)	Granit Mikashevichi (II)	Gorki
				Attendance: 300; Referee: Aleksandr Lodyanoy (Orsha)

15 June 2005	Torpedo-SKA Minsk (III)	0–0 (a.e.t.) (0–3 p)	Lokomotiv Vitebsk (II)	Minsk
				Stadium: Torpedo Stadium; Attendance: 1,000; Referee: Yuriy Maistrov (Fanipol)
	Penalties
	Prokopyuk (penalty missed); Mikhalev (penalty missed); Kazaryn (penalty missed)		(penalty scored) Beley; (penalty scored) Usaw; (penalty scored) Paznyak

== Round of 32 ==
16 winners of previous round were joined by 14 clubs from Premier League. Two winners of previous round (Baranovichi and Polotsk) advanced to the Round of 16 by drawing of lots. The games were played on 23 and 24 July 2005.

23 July 2005	Smena Minsk (II)	1–2	MTZ-RIPO Minsk	Minsk
17:00 UTC+3	Makaraw 90'		Todua 1'; V.Hleb 84'	Stadium: Torpedo Stadium; Attendance: 800; Referee: Dmitry Yevnevich (Minsk)

23 July 2005	Spartak Shklov (III)	0–1	BATE Borisov	Shklov
18:00 UTC+3			Vishnyakow 39'	Stadium: Spartak Stadium; Attendance: 2,000; Referee: Georgiy Verbitsky (Slonim)

24 July 2005	Gorki (III)	1–3	Neman Grodno	Gorki
16:00 UTC+3	Terpilo 77' (pen.)		Parfyonaw 33', 43'; Lyasyuk 87' (pen.)	Stadium: City Stadium; Attendance: 350; Referee: Valery Vyalichka (Minsk)

24 July 2005	Kommunalnik Slonim (II)	0–2	Shakhtyor Soligorsk	Slonim
17:00 UTC+3			Nikifarenka 36'; Borel 76'	Stadium: Yunost Stadium; Attendance: 1,700; Referee: Gennadiy Yarets (Minsk)

24 July 2005	Veras Nesvizh (II)	1–0	Dnepr-Transmash Mogilev	Nesvizh
17:00 UTC+3	Botvinko 65'			Stadium: Urozhay Stadium; Attendance: 1,700; Referee: Yuriy Kuntsevich (Grodno)

24 July 2005	Bereza (II)	1–3	Zvezda-BGU Minsk	Bereza
17:00 UTC+3	Trotsyuk 15'		Prokopchik 34'; Petkevich 45+1'; Khomutovskiy 88'	Stadium: City Stadium; Attendance: 500; Referee: Valeriy Yazevich (Lida)

24 July 2005	Torpedo-Kadino Mogilev (II)	0–1	Dinamo Brest	Mogilev
17:00 UTC+3			Sokol 48'	Stadium: Torpedo Stadium; Attendance: 600; Referee: Aleksei Kulbakov (Gomel)

24 July 2005	Smorgon (II)	0–1	Slavia Mozyr	Smorgon
18:00 UTC+3			Trunin 51'	Stadium: Yunost Stadium; Attendance: 2,500; Referee: Andrey Zhukov (Minsk)

24 July 2005	Khimik Svetlogorsk (II)	2–0	Darida Minsk Raion	Svetlogorsk
18:00 UTC+3	Shelukhin 2'; Yawseenka 63'			Stadium: Bumazhnik Stadium; Attendance: 4,500; Referee: Viktor Chernik (Mosty)

24 July 2005	Lokomotiv Vitebsk (II)	2–4	Dinamo Minsk	Vitebsk
18:00 UTC+3	Kuzminich 21'; Usaw 61'		Kvyatkovsky 68' (o.g.); Zoubek 73'; Kovel 79'; Razhkow 83'	Stadium: Vitebsky CSK; Attendance: 3,500; Referee: Yuriy Maistrov (Fanipol)

24 July 2005	Lida (II)	1–2	Gomel	Lida
18:00 UTC+3	Maslo 33'		Vasilyuk 83', 90+2'	Stadium: City Stadium; Attendance: 1,000; Referee: Nikita Pyreyev (Minsk)

24 July 2005	DYuSSh Kirovsk (A)	0–4	Lokomotiv Minsk	Kirovsk
18:00 UTC+3			Shvydakow 19'; Atangana 61'; Mikhnavets 63'; Linyow 80'	Stadium: DYuSSh Stadium; Attendance: 1,500; Referee: Oleg Chikun (Stolbtsy)

24 July 2005	Vedrich-97 Rechitsa (II)	1–4	Naftan Novopolotsk	Rechytsa
18:00 UTC+3	Novitskiy 83'		Chumachenko 4', 60'; Strypeykis 7'; Dubina 75'	Stadium: Central Stadium; Attendance: 500; Referee: Antuan Mayorov (Minsk)

24 July 2005	Orsha (II)	2–8	Torpedo Zhodino	Orsha
18:00 UTC+3	K.Demenkovets 16'; Aleshchanka 26'		Truhaw 27', 82'; Zuew 44', 90+2'; Rodionov 67', 87'; Dzivakow 78' (pen.); Kolomyts 84'	Stadium: City Stadium; Attendance: 1,000; Referee: Mikhail Tsukanov (Gomel)

== Round of 16 ==
The games were played on 21 September 2005.

21 September 2005	Zvezda-BGU Minsk	3–1	Neman Grodno	Minsk
16:00 UTC+3	Sosnovski 22'; Losik 40'; Lyavonchyk 88'		Malysh 87'	Stadium: Darida Stadium; Attendance: 500; Referee: Vladimir Sukhovarov (Orsha)

21 September 2005	Naftan Novopolotsk	0–4	Dinamo Minsk	Novopolotsk
16:00 UTC+3			Tsishkevich 16'; Edu 45'; Kovel 59', 64'	Stadium: Atlant Stadium; Attendance: 1,000; Referee: Igor Kruk (Molodechno)

21 September 2005	Baranovichi (II)	2–1	Polotsk (III)	Baranovichi
16:00 UTC+3	Borisik 1'; Petruchik 38'		Lazerko 90+2'	Stadium: Lokomotiv Stadium; Attendance: 2,500; Referee: Dmitry Yevnevich (Minsk)

21 September 2005	Khimik Svetlogorsk (II)	1–0	Veras Nesvizh (II)	Svetlogorsk
16:00 UTC+3	Sidorenko 12'			Stadium: Bumazhnik Stadium; Attendance: 4,000; Referee: Viktor Chernik (Mosty)

21 September 2005	MTZ-RIPO Minsk	2–3	Shakhtyor Soligorsk	Minsk
16:15 UTC+3	V.Hleb 25', 70' (pen.)		Makar 19', 31'; Kavalchuk 68' (pen.)	Stadium: Traktor Stadium; Attendance: 5,700; Referee: Aleksei Kulbakov (Gomel)

21 September 2005	Dinamo Brest	2–0 (a.e.t.)	Lokomotiv Minsk	Brest
19:00 UTC+3	Sherakow 109'; Mazalewski 111'			Stadium: OSK Brestskiy; Attendance: 4,100; Referee: Yuriy Kuntsevich (Grodno)

21 September 2005	BATE Borisov	2–2 (a.e.t.) (12–11 p)	Slavia Mozyr	Borisov
19:00 UTC+3	Kobets 27'; A.Baha 90+4'		Korotkevich 36'; Chumak 73'	Stadium: City Stadium; Attendance: 5,000; Referee: Valeriy Yazevich (Lida)
	Penalties
	A.Baha (penalty scored); Skripchenko (penalty missed); Zhavnerchik (penalty scored); Lebedzew (penalty missed); Kobets (penalty scored); Molosh (penalty scored); Radkov (penalty scored); Yermakovich (penalty scored); Likhtarovich (penalty scored); Khaletski (penalty scored); Fyedarovich (penalty scored); A.Baha (penalty scored); Skripchenko (penalty scored); Zhavnerchik (penalty missed); Lebedzew (penalty scored)		(penalty scored) Condrea; (penalty scored) Azarov; (penalty scored) Chumak; (penalty missed) Kosak; (penalty missed) Krokhan; (penalty scored) Vodovozov; (penalty scored) Fedorenko; (penalty scored) Verevka; (penalty scored) Zazimko; (penalty scored) Khamitov; (penalty scored) Ramanyuk; (penalty scored) Condrea; (penalty scored) Azarov; (penalty missed) Chumak; (penalty missed) Kosak

21 September 2005	Gomel	1–0	Torpedo Zhodino	Gomel
19:05 UTC+3	Razumaw 85'			Stadium: Central Stadium; Attendance: 2,600; Referee: Georgiy Verbitsky (Slonim)

== Quarterfinals ==
The first legs were played on April 1, 2006. The second legs were played on April 5, 2006.

Team 1	Agg.	Team 2	1st leg	2nd leg
Zvezda-BGU Minsk (II)	6–1	Baranovichi (II)	4–1	2–0
Gomel	5–1	Khimik Svetlogorsk (II)	5–1	0–0
Dinamo Minsk	0–2	Shakhtyor Soligorsk	0–1	0–1
Dinamo Brest	0–1	BATE Borisov	0–0	0–1

=== First leg ===
1 April 2006	Zvezda-BGU Minsk (II)	4–1	Baranovichi (II)	Minsk
12:00 UTC+3	Samoylenko 15', 64'; Sidko 69' (pen.); Sosnovski 90'		Gitselev 69'	Stadium: Football Manege; Attendance: 800; Referee: Georgiy Verbitsky (Slonim)

1 April 2006	Gomel	5–1	Khimik Svetlogorsk (II)	Minsk
15:00 UTC+3	Strypeykis 11', 53'; Vasilyuk 50', 57', 63'		Gavrilovich 34'	Stadium: Football Manege; Attendance: 900; Referee: Valery Vyalichka (Minsk)

1 April 2006	Dinamo Minsk	0–1	Shakhtyor Soligorsk	Minsk
17:00 UTC+3			Hancharyk 90'	Stadium: Dinamo Stadium; Attendance: 2,550; Referee: Sergey Shmolik (Brest)

1 April 2006	Dinamo Brest	0–0	BATE Borisov	Minsk
18:00 UTC+3				Stadium: Football Manege; Attendance: 1,500; Referee: Aleksei Kulbakov (Gomel)

=== Second leg ===
5 April 2006	Baranovichi (II)	0–2 (1–6 agg.)	Zvezda-BGU Minsk (II)	Minsk
15:00 UTC+3			Samoylenko 13'; Sidko 38'	Stadium: Football Manege; Attendance: 500; Referee: Igor Kruk (Molodechno)

5 April 2006	Khimik Svetlogorsk (II)	0–0 (1–5 agg.)	Gomel	Svetlogorsk
16:30 UTC+3				Stadium: Bumazhnik Stadium; Attendance: 3,500; Referee: Yuriy Maistrov (Fanipol)

5 April 2006	Shakhtyor Soligorsk	1–0 (2–0 agg.)	Dinamo Minsk	Lyuban
16:30 UTC+3	Martsinovich 19'			Stadium: City Stadium; Attendance: 5,000; Referee: Vladimir Sukhovarov (Orsha)

5 April 2006	BATE Borisov	1–0 (1–0 agg.)	Dinamo Brest	Minsk
18:00 UTC+3	Bliznyuk 21'			Stadium: Football Manege; Attendance: 2,000; Referee: Aleksandr Chebykin (Minsk)

== Semifinals ==
The first legs were played on April 10, 2006. The second legs were played on April 14, 2006.

Team 1	Agg.	Team 2	1st leg	2nd leg
Shakhtyor Soligorsk	(a) 1–1	Gomel	0–0	1–1
BATE Borisov	7–1	Zvezda-BGU Minsk (II)	3–1	4–0

=== First leg ===
10 April 2006	Shakhtyor Soligorsk	0–0	Gomel	Lyuban
16:30 UTC+3				Stadium: City Stadium; Attendance: 4,300; Referee: Aleksandr Chebykin (Minsk)

10 April 2006	BATE Borisov	3–1	Zvezda-BGU Minsk (II)	Borisov
18:00 UTC+3	Stasevich 56', 90+2'; Rodionov 57'		Avramchikov 9'	Stadium: City Stadium; Attendance: 2,700; Referee: Yuriy Kuntsevich (Grodno)

=== Second leg ===
14 April 2006	Zvezda-BGU Minsk (II)	0–4 (1–7 agg.)	BATE Borisov	Minsk
16:00 UTC+3			D.Platonaw 13'; Kobets 31'; Lebedzew 90', 90+1'	Stadium: Football Manege; Attendance: 800; Referee: Viktor Chernik (Mosty)

14 April 2006	Gomel	1–1 (1–1 (a) agg.)	Shakhtyor Soligorsk	Gomel
18:00 UTC+3	Vasilyuk 50'		Klimenka 59'	Stadium: Central Stadium; Attendance: 10,500; Referee: Andrey Zhukov (Minsk)

== Final ==
May 27, 2006
19:00

Shakhtyor Soligorsk	1–3 (a.e.t.)	BATE Borisov
Klimenka 65'	Report	Molash 26'; D. Platonaw 115'; Bliznyuk 117'

Dinamo Stadium, Minsk
Attendance: 5,200
Referee: Sergey Shmolik (Minsk)

SHAKHTYOR:
GK	16	(Belarus) Ihar Logvinaw
RB	18	(Belarus) Vadzim Lasowski		(substituted off) 53'
CB	3	(Belarus) Anatoly Budayev
CB	19	(Belarus) Pavel Plaskonny	(yellow card) 112' (yellow-red card) 117'
LB	20	(Belarus) Syarhey Kavalchuk
RM	10	(Belarus) Syarhey Nikifarenka		(substituted off) 46'
CM	7	(Belarus) Andrey Lyavonchyk	(yellow card) 44'
CM	5	(Belarus) Alyaksandr Yurevich (c)
LM	11	(Belarus) Mihail Martsinovich
RF	24	(Belarus) Pavel Byahanski		(substituted off) 95'
LF	9	(Belarus) Alyaksandr Klimenka
Substitutes:
GK	1	(Belarus) Ihar Hamlyak
FW	8	(Belarus) Viktor Borel		(substituted on) 95'
DF	12	(Belarus) Maksim Hukayla
MF	13	(Belarus) Alyaksandr Novik		(substituted on) 53'
MF	14	(Belarus) Pavel Shmigero
DF	17	(Belarus) Dzmitry Rawneyka
DF	22	(Belarus) Alyaksandr Bychanok		(substituted on) 46'
Manager:
(Belarus) Yury Vyarheychyk

BATE:
GK	12	(Belarus) Barys Pankrataw
RB	5	(Belarus) Alyaksey Baha	(yellow card) 36'
CB	4	(Belarus) Artem Radkov
CB	19	(Belarus) Alyaksey Khaletski	(yellow card) 90+2'
LB	3	(Belarus) Dmitry Molosh	(yellow card) 105'
RM	22	(Belarus) Ihar Stasevich		(substituted off) 61'
CM	2	(Belarus) Dzmitry Likhtarovich
CM	7	(Belarus) Alyaksandr Yermakovich (c)
RM	18	(Belarus) Alyaksandr Kobets
SS	9	(Belarus) Gennadi Bliznyuk		(substituted off) 118'
ST	20	(Belarus) Vitali Rodionov		(substituted off) 77'
Substitutes:
GK	1	(Belarus) Alyaksandr Fyedarovich
MF	8	(Belarus) Dzmitry Platonaw		(substituted on) 77'
MF	10	(Belarus) Sergey Krivets
DF	13	(Belarus) Dzmitry Klimovich
FW	14	(Belarus) Alyaksandr Lebedzew	(yellow card) 118'	(substituted on) 118'
DF	15	(Belarus) Maksim Zhavnerchik		(substituted on) 61'
LM	21	(Belarus) Pavel Platonaw
Manager:
(Belarus) Igor Kriushenko
