= Mikhail Sivakow =

Belarusian footballer

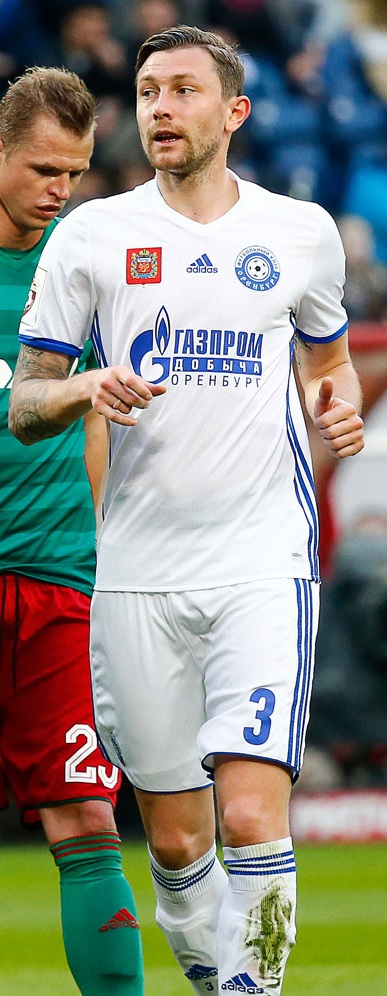
- Sivakow with Orenburg in 2017

Personal information
- Full name: Mikhail Syarheyevich Sivakow
- Date of birth: 16 January 1988 (age 38)
- Place of birth: Minsk, Soviet Union
- Height: 1.86 m (6 ft 1 in)
- Position: Centre-back

Team information
- Current team: SKA Rostov-on-Don

Youth career
- 2003–2005: BATE Borisov

Senior career*
Years	Team	Apps	(Gls)
2005–2008	BATE Borisov	36	(4)
2009–2011	Cagliari	3	(0)
2010	→ Piacenza (loan)	15	(2)
2011	→ Wisła Kraków (loan)	14	(1)
2011–2012	Zulte Waregem	14	(0)
2012	→ BATE Borisov (loan)	7	(0)
2013	BATE Borisov	19	(0)
2014	Gomel	14	(2)
2014	Chornomorets Odesa	10	(1)
2015	Gabala	11	(0)
2015–2016	Zorya Luhansk	36	(1)
2017	Orenburg	12	(0)
2017–2018	Amkar Perm	25	(1)
2018–2024	Orenburg	139	(5)
2024–	SKA Rostov-on-Don (amateur)		

International career^{‡}
2004–2005	Belarus U17	9	(2)
2005–2006	Belarus U18		
2006	Belarus U19	3	(0)
2008–2011	Belarus U21	24	(3)
2011–2012	Belarus Olympic	5	(1)
2010–2019	Belarus	25	(1)
Medal record
Representing Belarus
UEFA European Under-21 Championship
Third place	2011 Denmark
- * Club domestic league appearances and goals as of 29 April 2024 ‡ National team caps and goals as of 24 March 2019

Mikhail Syarheyevich Sivakow (Belarusian: Міхаі́л Сярге́евіч Сівако́ў, Russian: Михаи́л Серге́евич Сивако́в; born 16 January 1988) is a Belarusian professional footballer who plays as a centre-back for Russian Media Football League club SKA Rostov-on-Don.

== Career ==
=== Club ===
Sivakow began his career with Smena Minsk, before joining BATE Borisov in January 2003 where he scored 14 goals in 83 games for the reserves. At the age of 17, he received interest from German club Borussia Dortmund but never signed for them. He started playing with the senior side in 2005, participating in 13 games and scoring one goal in the Belarusian Premier League.

On 31 January 2009, he was signed by Italian Serie A side Cagliari in 4-year contract.

He made his Serie A debut on 8 November 2009, replaced Davide Biondini in the last minutes, against Sampdoria. On 27 January 2010, he was loaned to Piacenza to swap club with Radja Nainggolan.

On 28 January 2011, Sivakow signed a half-year loan deal with Wisła Kraków. He was the most remembered for his 51,1 m goal against Lechia Gdańsk.

On 25 August 2011, Sivakow left Cagliari to join Belgian Pro League side Zulte Waregem. He signed a four-year contract with the club.

On 28 January 2015, Sivakow signed a six-month contract with Azerbaijan Premier League side Gabala FK, linking up with fellow former FC Chornomorets Odesa players, Dmytro Bezotosnyi, Oleksiy Gai, Ruslan Fomin and manager Roman Hryhorchuk. Sivakow left Gabala at the end of his contract.

In June 2015, Sivakow signed a two-year contract with FC Zorya Luhansk.

On 19 January 2017, he signed with a Russian Premier League side FC Orenburg.

On 17 June 2017, he signed a two-year contract with another Russian club FC Amkar Perm.

On 24 July 2018, he returned to FC Orenburg after Amkar was declared bankrupt. Sivakow left Orenburg as his contract expired on 10 June 2024.

=== International ===
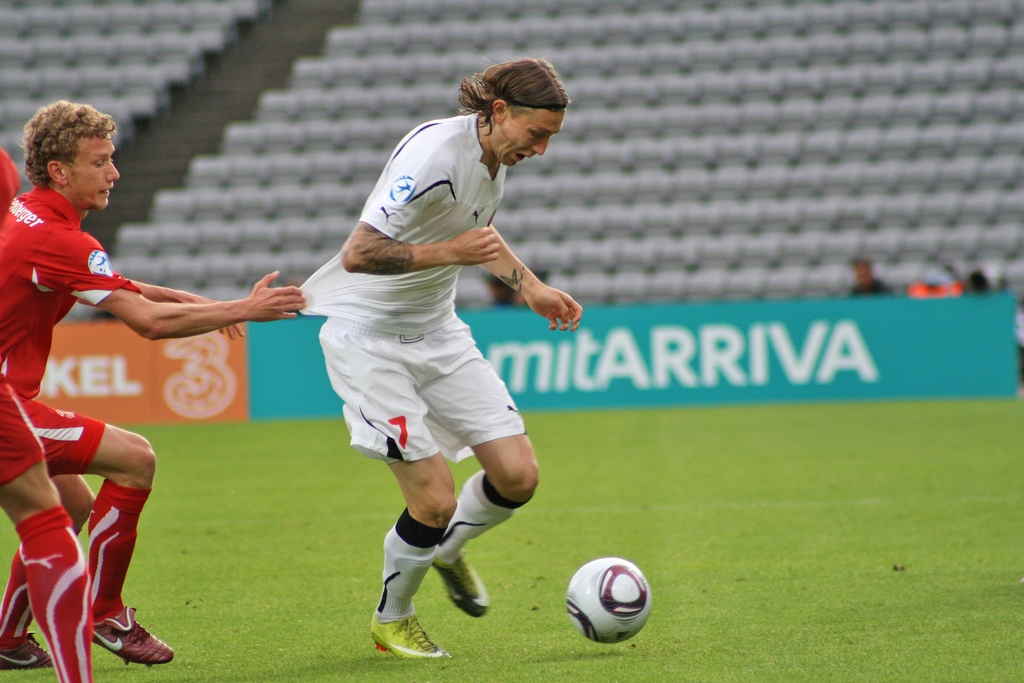
Mikhail Sivakow playing for Belarus U21

Sivakow played with the Belarus national football team's under 17 side from 2004 to 2005, and in 2006 with the under 19 side. In 2008, Sivakow became a member of the under 21 squad. He played his first game for the squad on 14 October 2008 and scored a goal in the 39th minute against Turkey. Sivakow was a leading member of the under 21 side that participated in the 2009 UEFA European Under-21 Football Championship and exited at the group stage. Two years later, he captained the under 21 team that finished in 3rd place at the 2011 UEFA European Under-21 Football Championship and qualified for the 2012 Olympics. Sivakow appeared in all five of the matches. He also captained the Belarus Olympic squad that participated in the 2012 Toulon Tournament, playing in all three of their matches and scoring one goal. Sivakow made his debut for the senior national side of his country on 2 June 2010, in the 0:1 home loss against Sweden in a friendly match after coming on as a substitute for Sergey Omelyanchuk during the second half.

== Personal life ==
His mother is of Polish descent.

== Career statistics ==
=== Club ===
As of match played 25 May 2024

Club	Season	League			National cup (Note: Includes Belarusian Cup, Coppa Italia, Polish Cup, Ukrainian Cup, Azerbaijan Cup, Russian Cup)		Continental		Other		Total	
Club	Season	Division	Apps	Goals	Apps	Goals	Apps	Goals	Apps	Goals	Apps	Goals
BATE Borisov	2005	Vysheyshaya Liga	2	0	1	0	0	0	0	0	3	0
BATE Borisov	2006	Vysheyshaya Liga	1	0	1	0	1	0	0	0	3	0
BATE Borisov	2007	Vysheyshaya Liga	10	1	1	1	4	0	0	0	15	2
BATE Borisov	2008	Vysheyshaya Liga	23	3	8	1	11	0	0	0	42	4
BATE Borisov	Total		36	4	11	2	16	0	0	0	63	6
Cagliari	2008–09	Serie A	0	0	0	0	0	0	0	0	0	0
Cagliari	2009–10	Serie A	1	0	0	0	0	0	0	0	1	0
Cagliari	2010–11	Serie A	2	0	1	0	0	0	0	0	3	0
Cagliari	Total		3	0	1	0	0	0	0	0	4	0
Piacenza (loan)	2009–10	Serie B	15	2	0	0	0	0	0	0	15	2
Wisła Kraków (loan)	2010–11	Ekstraklasa	14	1	2	0	0	0	0	0	16	1
Zulte Waregem	2011–12	Jupiler Pro League	14	0	0	0	0	0	0	0	14	0
BATE Borisov (loan)	2012	Vysheyshaya Liga	7	0	2	0	7	0	0	0	16	0
BATE Borisov	2013	Vysheyshaya Liga	18	0	0	0	1	0	1	0	20	0
Gomel	2014	Vysheyshaya Liga	14	2	1	0	0	0	0	0	15	2
Chornomorets Odesa	2014–15	Ukrainian Premier League	10	1	3	0	2	0	0	0	15	1
Gabala	2014–15	Azerbaijan Premier League	12	0	1	0	0	0	0	0	13	0
Zorya Luhansk	2015–16	Ukrainian Premier League	22	1	6	0	4	0	0	0	32	1
Zorya Luhansk	2016–17	Ukrainian Premier League	14	0	1	1	5	0	0	0	20	1
Zorya Luhansk	Total		36	1	7	1	9	0	0	0	52	2
Orenburg	2016–17	Russian Premier League	12	0	0	0	0	0	2 (Note: Two appearances in relegation play-offs)	0	14	0
Amkar Perm	2017–18	Russian Premier League	25	1	3	1	0	0	2 (Note: Two appearances in relegation play-offs)	0	30	2
Orenburg	2018–19	Russian Premier League	22	1	2	0	0	0	0	0	24	1
Orenburg	2019–20	Russian Premier League	19	0	2	0	0	0	0	0	21	0
Orenburg	2020–21	Russian First League	37	2	1	0	0	0	0	0	38	2
Orenburg	2021–22	Russian First League	27	2	0	0	0	0	1 (Note: Appearance in promotion play-offs)	0	28	2
Orenburg	2022–23	Russian Premier League	24	0	2	1	0	0	0	0	26	1
Orenburg	2023–24	Russian Premier League	10	0	7	0	0	0	0	0	17	0
Orenburg	Total		139	5	14	1	0	0	1	0	154	6
Career total			355	17	45	5	35	0	6	0	441	22

=== International ===
Belarus
Year	Apps	Goals
2010	1	0
2014	2	0
2015	4	0
2016	6	0
2017	3	1
Total	16	1

Statistics accurate as of match played 9 June 2017

=== International goals ===
Scores and results list Belarus' goal tally first.

No	Date	Venue	Opponent	Score	Result	Competition
1.	9 June 2017	Borisov Arena, Barysaw, Belarus	Bulgaria	1–0	2–1	2018 FIFA World Cup qualification

== Honours ==
BATE Borisov

- Belarusian Premier League: 2006, 2007, 2008, 2012, 2013
- Belarusian Cup: 2005–06
- Belarusian Super Cup: 2013

Wisła Kraków

- Ekstraklasa: 2010–11

Belarus U21

- UEFA European Under-21 Championship third place: 2011
