= Alyaksandr Lebedzew =

Belarusian footballer (born 1985)

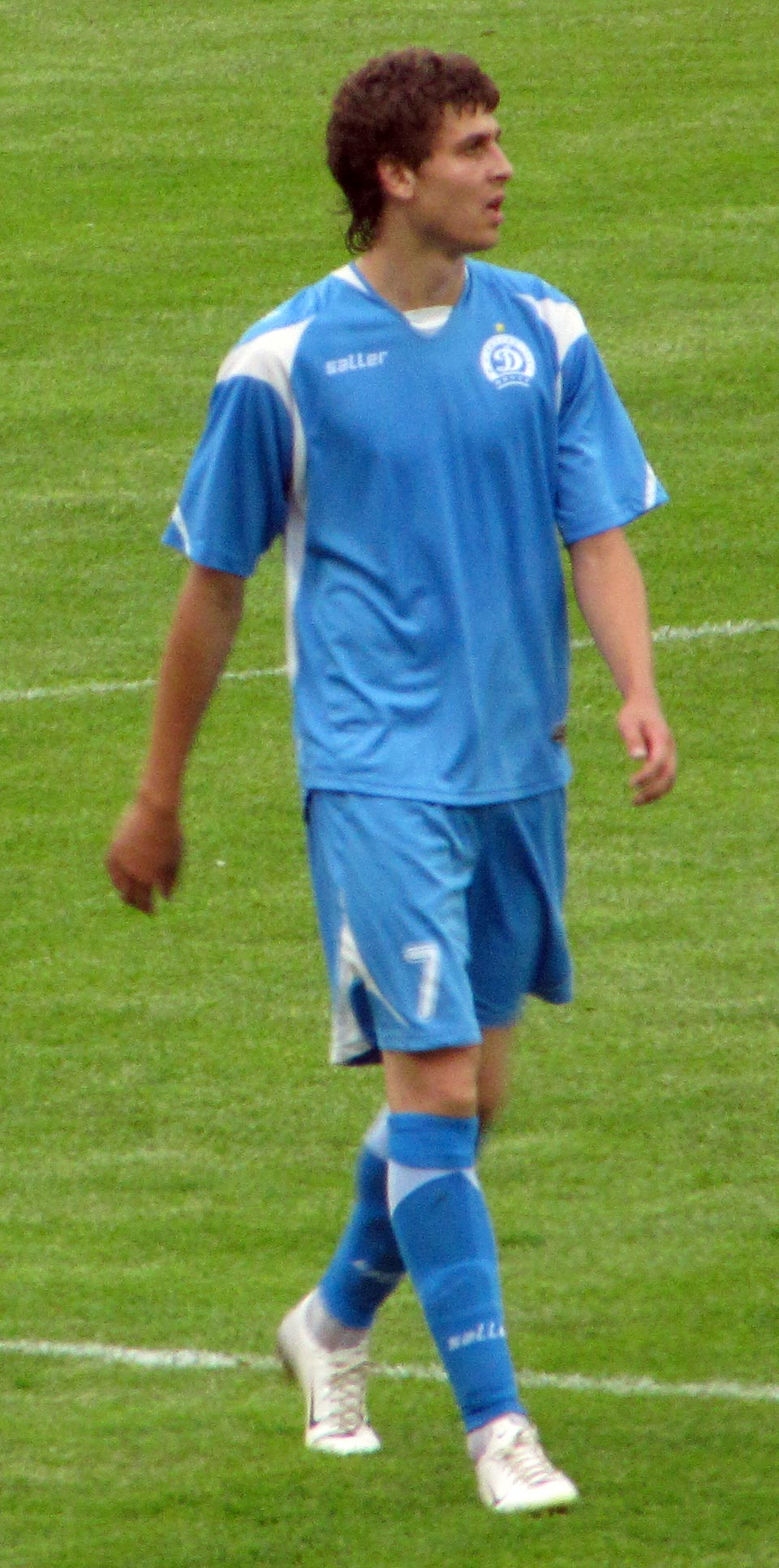
- Lebedzew with Dinamo Minsk

Personal information
- Date of birth: 14 April 1985 (age 41)
- Place of birth: Zazhevichi, Salihorsk Raion, Belarusian SSR
- Height: 1.93 m (6 ft 4 in)
- Position: Forward

Youth career
- SDYuSShOR-1 Soligorsk

Senior career*
Years	Team	Apps	(Gls)
2003–2006	BATE Borisov	60	(12)
2007–2008	Kuban Krasnodar	4	(0)
2008	→ Dinamo Minsk (loan)	30	(9)
2009–2010	Dinamo Minsk	10	(1)
2010	→ Belshina Bobruisk (loan)	23	(1)
2011	Dinamo Brest	14	(1)
2011	Shakhtyor Soligorsk	13	(0)
2012	Gorodeya	10	(5)
2012	Widzew Łódź	3	(0)
2013–2014	Gorodeya	14	(0)
2014–2016	Isloch Minsk Raion	49	(20)
Total		230	(49)

International career
2005	Belarus U21	3	(2)
- * Club domestic league appearances and goals

Alyaksandr Heorhiyevich Lebedzew (Belarusian: Аляксандр Лебедзеў; Russian: Александр Лебедев; born 14 April 1985) is a Belarusian former professional footballer who played as a forward.

== Career ==
Born in Zazhevichi, Salihorsk Raion, Lebedzew began playing football in FC BATE Borisov's youth system. He joined the senior team and made his Belarusian Premier League debut in 2003.

In August 2016, Lebedzew was one of several Isloch Minsk Raion players alleged to have been involved in fixing a match with Dinamo Brest on 30 April 2016. On 20 February 2018, the BFF banned him from football for life for his involvement in the match-fixing.

== Personal life ==
Lebedzew's brother, Dzmitry, was also a professional footballer.

== Honours ==
BATE Borisov

- Belarusian Premier League: 2006
- Belarusian Cup: 2005–06
