= Vitali Rodionov =

Belarusian footballer

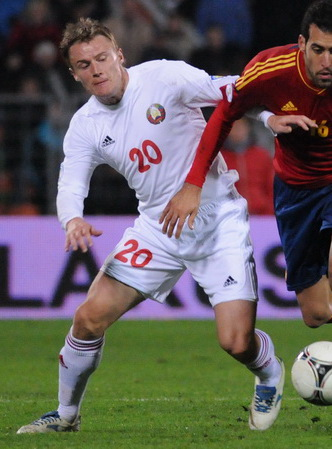
- Rodionov in 2012

Personal information
- Full name: Vital Viktaravich Radzivonaw
- Date of birth: 11 December 1983 (age 42)
- Place of birth: Vitebsk, Belarusian SSR, Soviet Union
- Height: 1.79 m (5 ft 10 in)
- Position: Forward

Youth career
- –2001: Lokomotiv-96 Vitebsk

Senior career*
Years	Team	Apps	(Gls)
2001–2002	Lokomotiv-96 Vitebsk	49	(6)
2003–2005	Torpedo Zhodino	57	(21)
2006–2017	BATE Borisov	272	(120)
2009	→ SC Freiburg (loan)	12	(4)
Total		390	(151)

International career
2002–2005	Belarus U21	10	(2)
2007–2017	Belarus	48	(10)
- * Club domestic league appearances and goals

Vital Viktaravich Radzivonaw (Belarusian: Віталь Віктаравіч Радзівонаў; Russian: Виталий Родионов; born 11 December 1983) is a Belarusian former professional footballer who played as a forward. He spent most of his career with BATE Borisov. After retirement, he stayed with BATE as the team's sporting director.

== Club career ==
Rodionov began his career in Lokomotiv-96 Vitebsk, before being scouted from Torpedo Zhodino. He played 57 games for Torpedo, before being transferred to BATE Borisov in 2005. On 10 January 2009, he was loaned out from BATE Borisov, until summer 2009 to SC Freiburg, who had an option of purchase, but selected not to use it. On 24 May 2012, Rodionov scored twice in the 2–0 win over Minsk and became the top scorer for BATE in the Belarusian Premier League with 57 goals, surpassing Vitali Kutuzov's record of 56 goals that had been set between 1998 and 2001. On 19 September 2012, Rodionov scored the second goal in BATE's 3–1 away victory over LOSC Lille, which was the first Champions League group stage win in the team's history. On 2 October 2012, he also scored in BATE's first group match home win in the Champions League – a 3–1 success against Bayern München. As of July 2016, he has netted 20 goals in European tournaments, the most of any Belarusian player.

== International career ==
Rodionov was a member of the Belarus national team and represented his country in Euro and World Cup qualifiers.

== Career statistics ==
Scores and results list Belarus goal tally first, score column indicates score after each Rodionov goal.

List of international goals scored by Vitali Rodionov
No.	Date	Venue	Opponent	Score	Result	Competition
1	10 September 2008	Estadi Comunal, Andorra la Vella, Andorra	Andorra	2–1	3–1	2010 FIFA World Cup qualification
2	1 April 2009	Central Stadium, Almaty, Kazakhstan	Kazakhstan	5–1	5–1	2010 FIFA World Cup qualification
3	10 June 2009	Haradski Stadium, Barysaw, Belarus	Moldova	1–0	2–2	Friendly
4	3 March 2010	Atatürk Stadium, Antalya, Turkey	Armenia	3–1	3–1	Friendly
5	12 October 2010	Dinamo Stadium, Minsk, Belarus	Albania	1–0	2–0	UEFA Euro 2012 qualification
6	17 November 2010	Seeb Stadium, Seeb, Oman	Oman	4–0	4–0	Friendly
7	25 March 2013	Khalifa International Stadium, Doha, Qatar	Canada	1–0	2–0	Friendly
8	3 June 2013	A. Le Coq Arena, Tallinn, Estonia	Estonia	2–0	2–0	Friendly
9	6 September 2013	Dinamo Stadium, Minsk, Belarus	Kyrgyzstan	2–0	3–1	Friendly
10	19 November 2013	Tevfik Sırrı Gür Stadium, Mersin, Turkey	Turkey	1–1	1–2	Friendly

== Honours ==
BATE Borisov

- Belarusian Premier League: 2006, 2007, 2008, 2009, 2010, 2011, 2012, 2013, 2014, 2015, 2016, 2017
- Belarusian Cup: 2005–06, 2009–10, 2014–15
- Belarusian Super Cup: 2010, 2013, 2014, 2015, 2016, 2017

Individual

- CIS Cup top goalscorer: 2007 (shared)
- Best forward in the Belarusian Premier League for the 2010 and 2011 seasons
- Listed among the 22 best players in the Belarusian Premier League (2005, 2007, 2008, 2010, 2011)
- Top scorer in the Belarusian Premier League in 2008 (honor shared with Gennadi Bliznyuk), 2013 and 2016 (shared with Mikhail Gordeichuk).
- Second place in the 2012 Belarusian Footballer of the Year rankings
