= Alyaksandr Fyedarovich =

Belarusian footballer (1973–2022)

Personal information
- Date of birth: 27 August 1973
- Place of birth: Minsk, Soviet Union
- Date of death: 5 January 2022 (aged 48)
- Height: 1.80 m (5 ft 11 in)
- Position: Goalkeeper

Senior career*
Years	Team	Apps	(Gls)
1992	Niva Samokhvalovichi	4	(0)
1993–1995	Dnepr Mogilev	74	(0)
1996–2004	BATE Borisov	149	(0)
2004	Naftan Novopolotsk	13	(0)
2005–2007	BATE Borisov	59	(0)
Total		299	(0)

International career
1994–1995	Belarus U21	7	(0)

Managerial career
- 2007–2013: BATE Borisov (goalkeeper coach)
- 2015–2022: BATE Borisov (goalkeeper coach)
- * Club domestic league appearances and goals

Alyaksandr Fedarovich (Belarusian: Аляксандр Федаровіч; Russian: Александр Федорович; 27 August 1973 – 5 January 2022) was a Belarusian professional footballer who played as a goalkeeper. He is of Polish descent.

== Career ==
Fedarovich holds the record (as of January 2021) for the most appearances for a BATE Borisov goalkeeper, having participated in 262 games in all competitions for the team. After his retirement he went on to work at BATE Borisov as a goalkeeper coach.

== Death ==
Fedarovich died on 5 January 2022, at the age of 48.

== Honours ==
BATE Borisov

- Belarusian Premier League: 1999, 2002, 2006, 2007
- Belarusian Cup: 2005–06
