= Dzmitry Klimovich =

Belarusian football defender (born 1984)

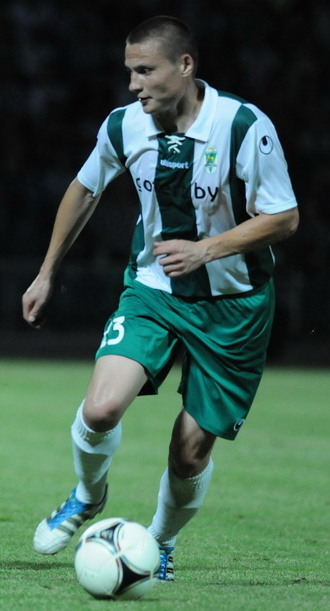

Personal information
- Full name: Dzmitry Ramualdavich Klimovich
- Date of birth: 9 February 1984 (age 42)
- Place of birth: Minsk, Belarusian SSR
- Height: 1.83 m (6 ft 0 in)
- Position: Defender

Youth career
- 2002–2003: BATE Borisov

Senior career*
Years	Team	Apps	(Gls)
2003–2006	BATE Borisov	25	(0)
2004	→ Torpedo Zhodino (loan)	3	(2)
2007–2009	Torpedo Zhodino	76	(6)
2010–2011	Minsk	52	(3)
2012	Gomel	28	(0)
2013	Belshina Bobruisk	24	(0)
2014	Zimbru Chișinău	18	(1)
2015–2016	Granit Mikashevichi	38	(4)
2016–2017	Krumkachy Minsk	28	(2)
2017–2018	Torpedo-BelAZ Zhodino	37	(0)
2019–2020	Minsk	34	(1)
2021	Arsenal Dzerzhinsk	11	(0)

International career
2002	Belarus U21	2	(0)
- * Club domestic league appearances and goals as of 31 December 2021

Dzmitry Ramualdavich Klimovich (Belarusian: Дзмітрый Рамуальдавіч Клімовіч; Russian: Дмитрий Климович (Dmitri Klimovich); born 9 February 1984) is a Belarusian former football defender. He played most of his career with FC BATE Borisov and FC Torpedo-BelAZ Zhodino.

== Honours ==
BATE Borisov

- Belarusian Premier League champion: 2006
- Belarusian Cup winner: 2005–06

Gomel

- Belarusian Super Cup winner: 2012

Zimbru Chișinău

- Moldovan Cup winner: 2013–14
- Moldovan Super Cup winner: 2014
