= Maksim Zhavnerchik =

Belarusian former football defender (born 1985)

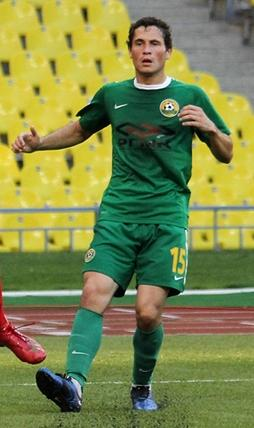

Personal information
- Full name: Maksim Anatolyevich Zhavnerchik
- Date of birth: 9 February 1985 (age 41)
- Place of birth: Soligorsk, Belarusian SSR
- Height: 1.79 m (5 ft 10 in)
- Position: Defender

Youth career
- 2002–2003: Shakhtyor Soligorsk

Senior career*
Years	Team	Apps	(Gls)
2003	Shakhtyor Soligorsk	0	(0)
2004–2008	BATE Borisov	83	(6)
2009–2014	Kuban Krasnodar	117	(2)
2015–2017	BATE Borisov	39	(0)
2017–2018	Dinamo Minsk	22	(0)

International career
2011–2014	Belarus	9	(0)
- * Club domestic league appearances and goals

Maksim Anatolyevich Zhavnerchik (Belarusian: Максім Анатольевіч Жаўнерчык; Russian: Максим Анатольевич Жавнерчик; born 9 February 1985) is a Belarusian former football defender.

== Career ==
Zhavnerchik received his first call-up to the national side for the friendly match against Kazakhstan, which was held on 9 February 2011, but remained an unused substitute for the game. On 29 March 2011, Zhavnerchik made his debut for the team, playing the first half in a friendly against Canada.

In January 2015, six-years after leaving BATE Borisov for Kuban Krasnodar, Zhavnerchik re-signed for BATE Borisov.

== Honours ==
BATE Borisov

- Belarusian Premier League champion: 2006, 2007, 2008, 2015, 2016, 2017
- Belarusian Cup winner: 2005–06, 2014–15
- Belarusian Super Cup winner: 2015, 2016, 2017
