= Barys Pankrataw =

Belarusian footballer

Personal information
- Date of birth: 30 December 1982 (age 43)
- Place of birth: Mogilev, Belarusian SSR, Soviet Union
- Height: 1.94 m (6 ft 4 in)
- Position: Goalkeeper

Team information
- Current team: BATE Borisov (gk coach)

Youth career
- 1999–2000: Dnepr Mogilev

Senior career*
Years	Team	Apps	(Gls)
1999	Dnepr-2 Mogilev	13	(0)
2001–2004	Spartak Shklov	92	(0)
2005–2007	BATE Borisov	20	(0)
2008	Dinamo Minsk	14	(0)
2009	Granit Mikashevichi	9	(0)
2010–2011	Dnepr Mogilev	26	(0)
2012	Neman Grodno	1	(0)
2013–2014	Dnepr Mogilev	31	(0)
2015–2016	Belshina Bobruisk	46	(0)
2017–2020	Slutsk	79	(0)
2021	Isloch Minsk Raion	12	(0)
2022–2023	Slutsk	6	(0)
2024	BATE-2 Borisov	7	(0)

Managerial career
- 2024–2025: BATE-2 Borisov (gk coach)
- 2025–: BATE Borisov (gk coach)
- * Club domestic league appearances and goals as of 10 December 2024

Barys Pankrataw (Belarusian: Барыс Панкратаў; Russian: Борис Панкратов; born 30 December 1982) is a Belarusian former footballer (goalkeeper).

== Honours ==
BATE Borisov

- Belarusian Premier League champion: 2006, 2007
- Belarusian Cup winner: 2005–06
