= Alyaksey Khaletski =

Belarusian footballer and coach

Personal information
- Date of birth: 19 June 1984 (age 42)
- Place of birth: Minsk, Belarusian SSR
- Height: 1.82 m (6 ft 0 in)
- Position: Defender

Team information
- Current team: Gorodeya (assistant coach)

Youth career
- 2001–2003: BATE Borisov

Senior career*
Years	Team	Apps	(Gls)
2004	Zvezda-BGU Minsk	7	(0)
2005–2008	BATE Borisov	36	(2)
2008	Torpedo Zhodino	13	(0)
2009	Belshina Bobruisk	25	(2)
2010	Mash'al Mubarek	9	(0)
2010	Vitebsk	12	(0)
2011–2012	Belshina Bobruisk	32	(2)
2013	Vitebsk	12	(3)
2013	Slutsk	10	(1)
2014	Granit Mikashevichi	28	(3)
2015–2016	Gorodeya	31	(0)

International career
2004	Belarus U21	1	(0)

Managerial career
- 2017–: Gorodeya (assistant)
- * Club domestic league appearances and goals as of 26 December 2016

Alyaksey Khaletski (Belarusian: Аляксей Халецкі; Russian: Алексей Халецкий; born 19 June 1984 in Minsk) is a Belarusian football coach and former player (defender).

== Honours ==
BATE Borisov

- Belarusian Premier League champion: 2006
- Belarusian Cup winner: 2005–06
