= Igor Stasevich =

Belarusian footballer

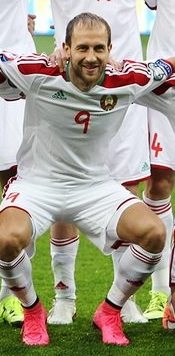
- Stasevich in 2015

Personal information
- Full name: Igor Nikolayevich Stasevich
- Date of birth: 21 October 1985 (age 41)
- Place of birth: Borisov, Minsk Oblast, Belarusian SSR, Soviet Union
- Height: 1.80 m (5 ft 11 in)
- Position: Attacking midfielder

Team information
- Current team: Atyrau
- Number: 7

Youth career
- 2002–2004: BATE Borisov

Senior career*
Years	Team	Apps	(Gls)
2004–2010	BATE Borisov	116	(8)
2010	Volga Nizhny Novgorod	6	(1)
2011	Gomel	32	(5)
2012–2014	Dinamo Minsk	87	(14)
2015–2020	BATE Borisov	156	(42)
2021	Shakhtyor Soligorsk	22	(2)
2022	Chayka Peschanokopskoye	11	(0)
2023–2024	Atyrau	46	(6)
2025	Turan	11	(2)
2025–	Atyrau	11	(0)

International career^{‡}
2006	Belarus U21	2	(0)
2007–2021	Belarus	63	(5)
- * Club domestic league appearances and goals as of 2 November 2025 ‡ National team caps and goals as of 31 March 2021

Igor Nikolayevich Stasevich (Belarusian: Ігар Мікалаевіч Стасевіч; Russian: Игорь Николаевич Стасевич; born 21 October 1985) is a Belarusian professional footballer who plays as an attacking midfielder for Atyrau.

== International career ==
=== International goals ===
Scores and results list Belarus' goal tally first.

#	Date	Venue	Opponent	Score	Result	Competition
1.	1 April 2009	Almaty Central Stadium, Almaty, Kazakhstan	Kazakhstan	3–1	5–1	2010 FIFA World Cup qualification
2.	4 September 2014	Borisov Arena, Barysaw, Belarus	Tajikistan	1–0	6–1	Friendly
3.	13 November 2017	Ramaz Shengelia Stadium, Kutaisi, Georgia	Georgia	1–0	2–2	Friendly
4.	8 September 2018	Dinamo Stadium, Minsk, Belarus	San Marino	1–0	5–0	2018–19 UEFA Nations League D
5.	24 March 2019	Windsor Park, Belfast, Northern Ireland	Northern Ireland	1–1	1–2	UEFA Euro 2020 qualification

== Honours ==
BATE Borisov

- Belarusian Premier League champion: 2006, 2007, 2008, 2009, 2010, 2015, 2016, 2017, 2018
- Belarusian Cup winner: 2005–06, 2009–10, 2014–15, 2019–20, 2020–21
- Belarusian Super Cup winner: 2010, 2015, 2016, 2017

Gomel

- Belarusian Cup winner: 2010–11

Shakhtyor Soligorsk

- Belarusian Premier League champion: 2021
- Belarusian Super Cup winner: 2021
