= 2005 Belarusian Premier League =

Belarusian Premier League
- Season: 2005
- Champions: Shakhtyor
- Relegated: Zvezda-BGU; Slavia
- Champions League: Shakhtyor Soligorsk
- UEFA Cup: BATE Borisov; Dinamo Minsk
- Intertoto Cup: MTZ-RIPO Minsk
- Matches: 182
- Goals: 516 (2.84 per match)
- Top goalscorer: (Belarus) Valery Strypeykis (16)
- Biggest home win: Dnepr-Transmash 6–0 Neman
- Biggest away win: Slavia 1–6 Shakhtyor; Slavia 0–5 MTZ-RIPO
- Highest scoring: Zvezda-BGU 5–3 Naftan

The 2005 Belarusian Premier League was the 15th season of top-tier football in Belarus. It started on April 16 and ended on November 5, 2005. Dinamo Minsk were the defending champions.

== Team changes from 2004 season ==
Two lowest placed teams in 2004 (Lokomotiv Vitebsk and Belshina Bobruisk) relegated to First League. Lokomotiv Minsk won the 2004 First League and were promoted. Vedrich-97 Rechytsa finished 2nd in First League and were supposed to be promoted as well. However, due to weak club infrastructure they couldn't obtain licence to compete in Premiere League and decided to stay in First League. Torpedo-SKA Minsk, who finished 6th in 2004, lost financial support from their sponsor in early 2005 and, after losing almost all their main squad and not having funds to pay entrance fee for next season's Premiere League, had to relegate to Second League. BFF decided not to replace two withdrawn teams with anyone and the league was reduced to 14 clubs. Zvezda-VA-BGU Minsk changed their name to Zvezda-BGU Minsk.

== Overview ==
Shakhtyor Soligorsk won their 1st champions title and qualified for the next season's Champions League. The championship runners-up Dinamo Minsk and 2005–06 Cup winners BATE Borisov qualified for UEFA Cup. Zvezda-BGU Minsk and Slavia, who finished on last two places, relegated to the First League.

== Teams and venues ==
Location of teams in 2005 Belarusian Premier League

Team	Location	Venue	Capacity	Position in 2004
Dinamo Minsk	Minsk	Dinamo Stadium	40,000	1
BATE	Borisov	City Stadium	5,500	2
Shakhtyor	Soligorsk	Stroitel Stadium	3,030	3
Torpedo	Zhodino	Torpedo Stadium	3,020	4
Gomel	Gomel	Central Stadium	10,600	5
Neman	Grodno	Neman Stadium	6,300	7
Dinamo Brest	Brest	OSK Brestskiy	3,380	8
Dnepr-Transmash	Mogilev	Spartak Stadium	6,800	9
Naftan	Novopolotsk	Atlant Stadium	4,500	10
Darida	Minsk Raion	Darida Stadium	3,300	11
Slavia	Mozyr	Yunost Stadium (Mozyr)	5,300	12
Zvezda-BGU	Minsk	Traktor Stadium	17,600	13
MTZ-RIPO	Minsk	Traktor Stadium	17,600	14
Lokomotiv	Minsk	Yunost Stadium (Smorgon)	3,000	First league, 1

1. One game played at Darida Stadium.
2. Lokomotiv Minsk spent the season at Yunost Stadium in Smorgon, as their own ground Lokomotiv Stadium did not meet Premier League criteria.

== Table ==
Pos	Team	Pld	W	D	L	GF	GA	GD	Pts	Qualification or relegation
1	Shakhtyor Soligorsk (C)	26	19	6	1	59	14	+45	63	Qualification for Champions League first qualifying round
2	Dinamo Minsk	26	15	5	6	50	26	+24	50	Qualification for UEFA Cup first qualifying round
3	MTZ-RIPO Minsk	26	16	1	9	43	30	+13	49	Qualification for Intertoto Cup first round
4	Torpedo Zhodino	26	14	5	7	40	25	+15	47	
5	BATE Borisov	26	12	11	3	42	27	+15	47	Qualification for UEFA Cup first qualifying round (Note: BATE Borisov qualified for the UEFA Cup first qualifying round by winning the 2005–06 Belarusian Cup.)
6	Dnepr-Transmash Mogilev	26	12	7	7	48	36	+12	43	
7	Gomel	26	12	3	11	34	32	+2	39	
8	Dinamo Brest	26	11	3	12	39	33	+6	36	
9	Naftan Novopolotsk	26	10	3	13	43	44	−1	33	
10	Darida Minsk Raion	26	7	8	11	30	36	−6	29	
11	Lokomotiv Minsk	26	7	5	14	30	43	−13	26	
12	Neman Grodno	26	7	3	16	20	50	−30	24	
13	Zvezda-BGU Minsk (R)	26	3	5	18	24	60	−36	14	Relegation to Belarusian First League
14	Slavia Mozyr (R)	26	2	5	19	14	60	−46	11	Relegation to Belarusian First League

Source: rsssf.com
Rules for classification: 1st points; 2nd matches won; 3rd head-to-head
(C) Champions; (R) Relegated

== Results ==
Home \ Away	BAT	DAR	DBR	DMI	DNE	GOM	LMN	MTZ	NAF	NEM	SHA	SLA	TZH	ZBM
BATE Borisov		1–1	2–1	1–0	2–1	1–1	1–0	0–1	3–0	2–0	0–2	2–0	0–1	4–0
Darida Minsk Raion	1–1		1–0	0–1	4–1	1–1	0–0	1–3	0–0	0–1	0–2	1–2	0–3	1–2
Dinamo Brest	1–2	0–2		1–1	2–1	1–0	1–2	1–0	1–0	4–1	0–1	2–0	0–1	3–0
Dinamo Minsk	2–2	0–1	2–0		5–2	3–1	4–0	3–1	3–2	0–1	1–0	1–0	2–0	3–0
Dnepr-Transmash Mogilev	1–1	3–3	2–2	0–0		1–0	5–1	2–1	1–1	6–0	1–1	0–0	1–0	4–0
Gomel	2–3	3–1	2–1	2–1	1–2		0–1	1–0	1–2	3–0	0–3	2–1	2–1	4–2
Lokomotiv Minsk	3–3	0–0	3–2	3–2	0–1	0–1		2–3	0–2	4–1	0–2	5–0	2–3	0–0
MTZ-RIPO Minsk	0–1	5–1	0–4	0–1	2–1	3–1	1–0		1–0	1–0	1–1	2–0	1–0	3–1
Naftan Novopolotsk	1–2	3–2	2–1	3–2	3–4	0–2	4–0	2–3		3–0	1–4	3–1	0–2	3–1
Neman Grodno	1–1	1–3	2–2	1–2	1–3	1–2	2–0	0–2	1–0		0–3	1–0	0–2	1–0
Shakhtyor Soligorsk	2–2	3–1	4–0	1–1	3–0	1–0	1–0	3–1	2–2	3–0		0–0	4–0	3–1
Slavia Mozyr	2–2	0–1	1–3	0–4	0–3	1–1	0–2	0–5	1–3	1–1	1–6		0–2	0–1
Torpedo Zhodino	1–1	0–0	0–2	2–2	3–0	1–0	3–1	3–1	1–0	3–2	0–1	6–1		0–0
Zvezda-BGU Minsk	2–2	0–4	1–4	2–4	0–2	0–1	1–1	1–2	5–3	0–1	1–3	1–2	2–2	

Source: football.by (in Belarusian)
Legend: Blue = home team win; Yellow = draw; Red = away team win.

== Belarusian clubs in European Cups ==
Round	Team #1	Agg.	Team #2	1st leg	2nd leg
2005 UEFA Intertoto Cup
First round	Neman Grodno (Belarus)	0–1	(Czech Republic) Tescoma Zlín	0–1	0–0
2005–06 UEFA Cup
First qualifying round	Ferencváros Budapest (Hungary)	2–3	(Belarus) MTZ-RIPO Minsk	0–2	2–1
First qualifying round	Torpedo Kutaisi (Georgia (country))	0–6	(Belarus) BATE Borisov	0–1	0–5
Second qualifying round	MTZ-RIPO Minsk (Belarus)	2–3	(Czech Republic) Teplice	1–1	1–2
Second qualifying round	Krylia Sovetov Samara (Russia)	4–0	(Belarus) BATE Borisov	2–0	2–0
2005–06 UEFA Champions League
First qualifying round	Dinamo Minsk (Belarus)	1–2	(Cyprus) Anorthosis Famagusta	1–1	0–1

== Top scorers ==
Rank	Name	Team	Goals
1	(Belarus) Valery Strypeykis	Naftan Novopolotsk	16
2	(Ukraine) Ihor Chumachenko	Naftan Novopolotsk	14
2	(Belarus) Alyaksandr Klimenka	Shakhtyor Soligorsk	14
4	(Belarus) Vitali Rodionov	Torpedo Zhodino	14
4	(Belarus) Roman Vasilyuk	Gomel	13
6	(Belarus) Vadzim Boyka	Dinamo Brest	12
6	(Belarus) Syarhey Nikiforenka	Shakhtyor Soligorsk	12
8	(Belarus) Alyaksandr Kobets	BATE Borisov	11
9	(Belarus) Artyom Kontsevoy	MTZ-RIPO Minsk	10
9	(Belarus) Alyaksandr Pawlaw	Dnepr-Transmash Mogilev	10

== See also ==
- 2005 Belarusian First League
- 2004–05 Belarusian Cup
- 2005–06 Belarusian Cup
