= Dzmitry Likhtarovich =

Belarusian footballer (born 1978)

Personal information
- Full name: Dzmitry Yawhenavich Likhtarovich
- Date of birth: 1 March 1978 (age 48)
- Place of birth: Mogilev, Belarusian SSR, Soviet Union
- Height: 1.80 m (5 ft 11 in)
- Position: Midfielder

Team information
- Current team: BATE Borisov (coach)

Youth career
- 1993–1997: Dnepr Mogilev

Senior career*
Years	Team	Apps	(Gls)
1994–2001	Dnepr-Transmash Mogilev	183	(12)
2002–2015	BATE Borisov	288	(6)

International career
1993–1994	Belarus U16	6	(0)
1995	Belarus U18	2	(0)
1998–1999	Belarus U21	11	(0)
2004	Belarus Olympic	2	(0)
2007	Belarus	1	(0)

Managerial career
- 2016–2019: BATE Borisov (reserves)
- 2020: BATE Borisov (assistant)
- 2021–2022: BATE Borisov (reserves)
- 2023–: BATE Borisov (assistant)
- * Club domestic league appearances and goals

Dzmitry Yawhenavich Likhtarovich (Belarusian: Дзмітрый Яўгенавіч Ліхтаровіч; Russian: Дмитрий Евгеньевич Лихтарович; born 1 March 1978) is a Belarusian retired professional footballer who played as a midfielder for BATE Borisov and Dnepr-Transmash Mogilev.

== Career ==
Likhtarovich was born in Mogilev. As of 3 November 2012, he had appeared in 600 matches while being a member of Belarusian Premier League, Cup and national team squads. On 23 July 2013, he was played in a UEFA Champions League qualifying match against Kazakh side Shakhter Karagandy and became the footballer with the most appearances in the "Sergey Aleynikov" club, with 613 games under his bag, surpassing fellow Belarusian Sergey Gurenko.

== Honours ==
Dnepr-Transmash Mogilev

- Belarusian Premier League: 1998

BATE Borisov

- Belarusian Premier League: 2002, 2006, 2007, 2008, 2009, 2010, 2011, 2012, 2013, 2014, 2015
- Belarusian Cup: 2005–06, 2009–10, 2014–15
- Belarusian Super Cup: 2010, 2011, 2013, 2014, 2015
