= Likhtarovich =

Likhtarovich (Belarusian: Ліхтаровіч) is a gender-neutral Belarusian surname. Notable people with the surname include:

- Dzmitry Likhtarovich (born 1978), Belarusian footballer
- Tatsiana Likhtarovich (born 1988), Belarusian basketball player
