= Alyaksandr Yermakovich =

Russian footballer and manager (born 1975)

Alyaksandr Yermakovich Александр Ермакович
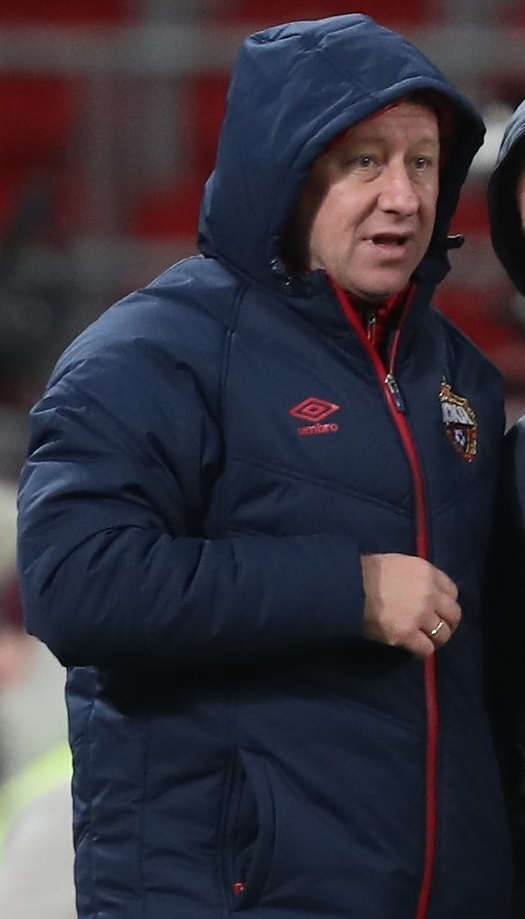
- Yermakovich working with CSKA Moscow in 2018

Personal information
- Full name: Alyaksandr Uladzimiravich Yermakovich
- Date of birth: 21 January 1975 (age 51)
- Place of birth: Luninets, Belarusian SSR
- Height: 1.74 m (5 ft 9 in)
- Position: Midfielder

Youth career
- RUOR Minsk

Senior career*
Years	Team	Apps	(Gls)
1992	Dinamo-2 Minsk	4	(0)
1993–1997	Ataka-Aura Minsk	111	(16)
1998–2008	BATE Borisov	223	(13)
Total		338	(29)

International career
1996	Belarus U21	1	(0)

Managerial career
- 2008–2013: BATE Borisov (assistant)
- 2013–2017: BATE Borisov
- 2018–2021: CSKA Moscow (assistant)
- 2021–2022: Krasnodar (assistant)
- 2022–2024: Ural Yekaterinburg (assistant)
- 2024–2025: Pari Nizhny Novgorod (assistant)
- * Club domestic league appearances and goals

Alyaksandr Uladzimiravich Yermakovich (Belarusian: Аляксандр Уладзіміравіч Ермаковіч; Russian: Александр Владимирович Ермакович; born 21 January 1975) is a Belarusian football manager and a former midfielder.

== Coaching career ==
Since 2008 he has been an assistant coach in BATE Borisov, and in October 2013 he was appointed as the team's head coach. On 9 January 2018, he was hired as an assistant coach at PFC CSKA Moscow, joining former BATE manager Viktor Goncharenko whom Yermakovich had already assisted at the Belarusian club. In April 2021, he moved with Goncharenko to FC Krasnodar. On 5 January 2022, Krasnodar fired Goncharenko and his assistants, including Yermakovich. On 18 August 2022, Yermakovich rejoined Goncharenko at Ural Yekaterinburg.

== Honours ==
=== Player ===
BATE Borisov

- Belarusian Premier League champion: 1999, 2002, 2006, 2007, 2008
- Belarusian Cup winner: 2005–06

=== Coach ===
BATE Borisov

- Belarusian Premier League champion: 2013, 2014, 2015, 2016
- Belarusian Cup winner: 2014–15
- Belarusian Super Cup winner: 2014, 2015, 2016
