= Alyaksandr Kobets =

Belarusian footballer

Personal information
- Date of birth: 11 June 1981 (age 45)
- Place of birth: Soligorsk, Belarusian SSR
- Height: 1.70 m (5 ft 7 in)
- Position: Midfielder

Youth career
- DYuSSh Soligorsk

Senior career*
Years	Team	Apps	(Gls)
1999–2000	Starye Dorogi	28	(3)
2001–2006	BATE Borisov	112	(20)
2007–2008	Gomel	34	(7)
2008–2010	Vitebsk	62	(8)
2011–2012	Naftan Novopolotsk	57	(3)
2013–2016	Slavia Mozyr	84	(4)

International career
2001–2004	Belarus U21	9	(1)
- * Club domestic league appearances and goals as of 31 December 2016

Alyaksandr Kobets (Belarusian: Аляксандр Кобец; Russian: Александр Кобец; born 11 June 1981) is a Belarusian former professional footballer.

== Honours ==
BATE Borisov

- Belarusian Premier League champion: 2002, 2006
- Belarusian Cup winner: 2005–06

Naftan Novopolotsk

- Belarusian Cup winner: 2011–12
