= Igor Kriushenko =

Belarusian footballer (born 1964)

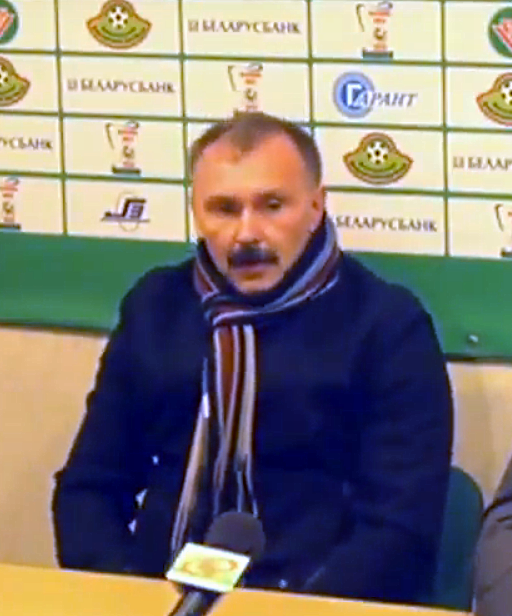
- Kriushenko in 2013

Personal information
- Full name: Igor Nikolayevich Kriushenko
- Date of birth: 10 February 1964 (age 62)
- Place of birth: Minsk, Belarus
- Position: Midfielder

Team information
- Current team: Dnepr Mogilev (manager)

Senior career*
Years	Team	Apps	(Gls)
1982–1984	Dinamo Minsk	0	(0)
1985–1986	Khimik Grodno	56	(8)
1986	Obuvschik Lida		
1988	Alga Frunze	27	(1)
1989	Aktyubinets	17	(2)
1990–1993	Metallurg Aldan	16	(0)
1994–1995	Dinamo Yakutsk	16	(0)
1996	Selenga Ulan-Ude	1	(0)
1997	Torpedo-Kadino Mogilev	18	(0)

Managerial career
- 1994–1995: Dinamo Yakutsk (assistant)
- 1998: Torpedo-Kadino Mogilev (assistant)
- 1999–2000: Smena-BATE Minsk
- 2001–2004: BATE Borisov (reserves)
- 2005–2007: BATE Borisov
- 2007–2008: Dinamo Minsk
- 2009–2011: Sibir Novosibirsk
- 2011–2012: Shurtan Guzar
- 2012–2017: Torpedo-BelAZ Zhodino
- 2017–2019: Belarus
- 2019–2021: Persikabo 1973
- 2022–2023: Dynamo Brest
- 2024: BATE Borisov
- 2024–2026: Naftan Novopolotsk
- 2026–: Dnepr Mogilev
- * Club domestic league appearances and goals

Igor Nikolayevich Kriushenko (Russian: Игорь Николаевич Криушенко; born 10 February 1964) is a Belarusian professional football manager and former player, who played as a midfielder.

== Honours ==
=== Manager ===
BATE Borisov

- Belarusian Premier League: 2006, 2007
- Belarusian Cup: 2005–06

Torpedo-BelAZ Zhodino

- Belarusian Cup: 2015–16

== Other achievements ==
- Final of Cup (BATE 2005, 2007).
- Third qualification round of Champions League (BATE, 2007).
- Silver medalist Belarus league (Dinamo Minsk, 2008).
- Promoted FC Sibir Novosibirsk from Russian First Division to Premier League (2009).
- Final of Russian cup (2010).
- Play-off round of Europa League (2010).

As a player, he made his debut in the Soviet Second League in 1985 for Khimik Grodno.

== Managerial statistics ==
As of 1 September 2024

Team	From	To	Record				
Team	From	To	G	W	D	L	Win %
BATE Borisov	1 January 2005	12 November 2007	109	62	22	25	56.88
Dinamo Minsk	13 November 2007	17 September 2008	28	14	5	9	50.00
Sibir Novosibirsk	20 December 2008	9 May 2011	89	37	17	35	41.57
Torpedo-BelAZ Zhodino	8 November 2012	23 July 2017	165	70	41	54	42.42
Belarus	1 March 2017	7 December 2019	25	8	4	13	32.00
Persikabo 1973	7 December 2019	23 November 2021	22	4	10	8	18.18
Dynamo Brest	10 December 2022	18 April 2023	4	0	0	4	0.00
BATE Borisov	4 January 2024	27 August 2024	23	8	4	11	34.78
Total			465	203	103	159	43.66
