= Aleksey Baga =

Belarusian footballer and manager

Personal information
- Full name: Aleksey Anatolyevich Baga
- Date of birth: 4 February 1981 (age 45)
- Place of birth: Borisov, Belarusian SSR, Soviet Union
- Height: 1.76 m (5 ft 9 1/2 in)
- Position: Defender

Senior career*
| Years | Team | Apps | (Gls) |
| 1998–2000 | BATE Borisov | 15 | (0) |
| 1998–1999 | → Smena-BATE Minsk | 18 | (2) |
| 2000 | → RShVSM-Olympia Minsk | 4 | (0) |
| 2001–2006 | BATE Borisov | 119 | (16) |
| 2007 | Daugava Daugavpils | 14 | (2) |
| 2008–2010 | Dynamo Brest | 42 | (1) |

International career
| 2000–2004 | Belarus U21 | 38 | (2) |

Managerial career
- 2011–2018: BATE Borisov (assistant)
- 2018–2019: BATE Borisov
- 2020: Žalgiris
- 2021: Aktobe
- 2021: Shakhtyor Soligorsk
- 2022: Sumgayit
- 2022–2023: Shakhtyor Soligorsk
- 2023–2024: Sokol Saratov
- 2025–2026: Leningradets
- 2026: Torpedo-BelAZ Zhodino
- * Club domestic league appearances and goals

Aleksey Anatolyevich Baga (Belarusian: Аляксей Анатольевіч Бага; Russian: Алексей Анатольевич Бага; born 4 February 1981) is a Belarusian professional football manager and former player.

== Managerial career ==
After retirement in early 2011, Baga returned to BATE Borisov to work as an assistant manager. In June 2018 he was appointed as BATE Borisov manager, staying on that position until December 2019. He won the Belarusian Premier League with BATE in 2018.

In January 2020, Baga became the new manager of Lithuanian A Lyga club Žalgiris.

On 21 January 2021, Baga was appointed as Head Coach of Aktobe, resigning from this position on 5 May 2021.

On 30 December 2021, Baga was appointed as the new Head Coach of Sumgayit on a 2.5-year contract.

In December 2023, he became the head coach of the Russian team Sokol Saratov. On 18 November 2024 he resigned.

== Personal life ==
Aleksey's younger brother Dzmitry is also a professional footballer who plays for BATE Borisov.

== Honours ==
=== Player ===
BATE Borisov

- Belarusian Premier League: 2002, 2006
- Belarusian Cup: 2005–06

=== Manager ===
BATE Borisov

- Belarusian Premier League: 2018

Žalgiris Vilnius

- A Lyga: 2020

Shakhtyor Soligorsk

- Belarusian Premier League: 2021
- Belarusian Super Cup: 2021, 2023
