= 2010 FIFA World Cup qualification – UEFA Group 6 =

The 2010 FIFA World Cup qualification UEFA Group 6 was a UEFA qualifying group for the 2010 FIFA World Cup. The group comprised Croatia, England, Ukraine, Belarus, Kazakhstan and Andorra.

The group was won by England, who qualified for the 2010 FIFA World Cup. The runners-up Ukraine entered the UEFA play-off stage.

== Standings ==
Pos	Team	Pld	W	D	L	GF	GA	GD	Pts	Qualification	(England)	(Ukraine)	(Croatia)	(Belarus)	(Kazakhstan)	(Andorra)
1	England	10	9	0	1	34	6	+28	27	Qualification to 2010 FIFA World Cup	—	2–1	5–1	3–0	5–1	6–0
2	Ukraine	10	6	3	1	21	6	+15	21	Advance to second round	1–0	—	0–0	1–0	2–1	5–0
3	Croatia	10	6	2	2	19	13	+6	20		1–4	2–2	—	1–0	3–0	4–0
4	Belarus	10	4	1	5	19	14	+5	13		1–3	0–0	1–3	—	4–0	5–1
5	Kazakhstan	10	2	0	8	11	29	−18	6		0–4	1–3	1–2	1–5	—	3–0
6	Andorra	10	0	0	10	3	39	−36	0		0–2	0–6	0–2	1–3	1–3	—

== Matches ==
The fixture list was determined on 14 January 2008 in Zagreb, Croatia. The August 2009 date in the international match calendar was moved forward by one week, from 19 August to 12 August 2009, at the FIFA Executive Committee meeting on 27 May 2008.

20 August 2008
21:00 UTC+6

Kazakhstan	3–0	Andorra
Ostapenko 14', 30'; Uzdenov 44'	Report

Almaty Central Stadium, Almaty
Attendance: 7,700
Referee: Veaceslav Banari (Moldova)

6 September 2008
20:00 UTC+3

Ukraine	1–0	Belarus
Shevchenko 90+4' (pen.)	Report

Ukraina Stadium, Lviv
Attendance: 24,000
Referee: Nicola Rizzoli (Italy)
6 September 2008
20:00 UTC+2

Andorra	0–2	England
	Report	J. Cole 49', 55'

Estadi Olímpic Lluís Companys, Barcelona (Note: Played in Barcelona, Spain to accommodate a larger capacity crowd.)
Attendance: 10,300
Referee: Cüneyt Çakır (Turkey)
6 September 2008
20:15 UTC+2

Croatia	3–0	Kazakhstan
N. Kovač 13'; Modrić 36'; Petrić 81'	Report

Maksimir Stadium, Zagreb
Attendance: 17,424
Referee: Stefan Johannesson (Sweden)

10 September 2008
22:00 UTC+6

Kazakhstan	1–3	Ukraine
Ostapenko 68'	Report	Nazarenko 45', 80'; Shevchenko 54'

Almaty Central Stadium, Almaty
Attendance: 17,000
Referee: Felix Brych (Germany)
10 September 2008
19:00 UTC+2

Andorra	1–3	Belarus
Pujol 67' (pen.)	Report	Verkhovtsov 37'; Rodionov 79'; V. Hleb 90'

Comunal, Andorra la Vella
Attendance: 600
Referee: Simon Evans (Wales)
10 September 2008
21:00 UTC+2

Croatia	1–4	England
Mandžukić 78'	Report	Walcott 26', 59', 82'; Rooney 63'

Maksimir Stadium, Zagreb
Attendance: 35,218
Referee: Ľuboš Micheľ (Slovakia)

11 October 2008
17:15 UTC+1

England	5–1	Kazakhstan
Ferdinand 52'; Kuchma 64' (o.g.); Rooney 76', 86'; Defoe 90'	Report	Kukeyev 68'

Wembley Stadium, London
Attendance: 89,107
Referee: Paul Allaerts (Belgium)
11 October 2008
20:00 UTC+3

Ukraine	0–0	Croatia
	Report

Metalist Stadium, Kharkiv
Attendance: 38,500
Referee: Eric Braamhaar (Netherlands)

15 October 2008
20:15 UTC+2

Croatia	4–0	Andorra
Rakitić 16', 87' (pen.); Olić 32'; Modrić 75'	Report

Maksimir Stadium, Zagreb
Attendance: 14,441
Referee: István Vad (Hungary)
15 October 2008
21:30 UTC+3

Belarus	1–3	England
Sitko 28'	Report	Gerrard 11'; Rooney 50', 74'

Dinamo Stadium, Minsk
Attendance: 29,600
Referee: Terje Hauge (Norway)

1 April 2009
20:30 UTC+6

Kazakhstan	1–5	Belarus
Abdulin 10'	Report	A. Hleb 48'; Kalachev 54', 64'; Stasevich 57'; Rodionov 88'

Almaty Central Stadium, Almaty
Attendance: 19,000
Referee: Jiří Jech (Czech Republic)
1 April 2009
20:30 UTC+2

Andorra	0–2	Croatia
	Report	Klasnić 15'; Eduardo 35'

Comunal, Andorra la Vella
Attendance: 1,100
Referee: Leontios Trattou (Cyprus)
1 April 2009
20:00 UTC+1

England	2–1	Ukraine
Crouch 29'; Terry 85'	Report	Shevchenko 74'

Wembley Stadium, London
Attendance: 87,548
Referee: Claus Bo Larsen (Denmark)

6 June 2009
21:00 UTC+6

Kazakhstan	0–4	England
	Report	Barry 40'; Heskey 45+1'; Rooney 72'; Lampard 77' (pen.)

Almaty Central Stadium, Almaty
Attendance: 24,000
Referee: Kristinn Jakobsson (Iceland)
6 June 2009
19:00 UTC+3

Belarus	5–1	Andorra
Bliznyuk 2', 76'; Kalachev 44'; Kornilenko 50', 65'	Report	I. Lima 90+3' (pen.)

Neman Stadium, Grodno
Attendance: 8,500
Referee: Robert Kranjc (Slovenia)
6 June 2009
20:15 UTC+2

Croatia	2–2	Ukraine
Petrić 2'; Modrić 68'	Report	Shevchenko 13'; Gai 54'

Maksimir Stadium, Zagreb
Attendance: 32,073
Referee: Terje Hauge (Norway)

10 June 2009
20:00 UTC+3

Ukraine	2–1	Kazakhstan
Nazarenko 33', 47'	Report	Nusserbayev 19'

Lobanovsky Dynamo Stadium, Kyiv
Attendance: 11,500
Referee: Bruno Paixão (Portugal)
10 June 2009
20:15 UTC+1

England	6–0	Andorra
Rooney 4', 39'; Lampard 29'; Defoe 73', 76'; Crouch 81'	Report

Wembley Stadium, London
Attendance: 57,897
Referee: Bas Nijhuis (Netherlands)

12 August 2009
21:15 UTC+3

Belarus	1–3	Croatia
Verkhovtsov 81'	Report	Olić 22', 85'; Eduardo 69'

Dinamo Stadium, Minsk
Attendance: 21,651
Referee: Felix Brych (Germany)

5 September 2009
17:00 UTC+3

Ukraine	5–0	Andorra
Yarmolenko 18'; Milevskyi 45+2', 90+2' (pen.); Shevchenko 72' (pen.); Seleznyov 90+4' (pen.)	Report

Lobanovsky Dynamo Stadium, Kyiv
Attendance: 14,870
Referee: Andrejs Sipailo (Latvia)
5 September 2009
20:30 UTC+2

Croatia	1–0	Belarus
Rakitić 24'	Report

Maksimir Stadium, Zagreb
Attendance: 25,628
Referee: Konrad Plautz (Austria)

9 September 2009
20:00 UTC+3

Belarus	0–0	Ukraine
	Report

Dinamo Stadium, Minsk
Attendance: 21,727
Referee: Viktor Kassai (Hungary)
9 September 2009
20:00 UTC+2

Andorra	1–3	Kazakhstan
Sonejee 70'	Report	Khizhnichenko 14', 35'; Baltiev 29'

Comunal, Andorra la Vella
Attendance: 510
Referee: Albert Toussaint (Luxembourg)
9 September 2009
20:00 UTC+1

England	5–1	Croatia
Lampard 7' (pen.), 59'; Gerrard 18', 67'; Rooney 77'	Report	Eduardo 71'

Wembley Stadium, London
Attendance: 87,319
Referee: Alberto Undiano Mallenco (Spain)

10 October 2009
18:00 UTC+3

Belarus	4–0	Kazakhstan
Bardachov 23'; Kalachev 69', 90+3'; Kovel 86'	Report

Regional Sport Complex Brestskiy, Brest
Attendance: 10,000
Referee: Saïd Ennjimi (France)
10 October 2009
19:15 UTC+3

Ukraine	1–0	England
Nazarenko 29'	Report

Dnipro Arena, Dnipropetrovsk
Attendance: 31,000
Referee: Damir Skomina (Slovenia)

14 October 2009
17:30 UTC+2

Andorra	0–6	Ukraine
	Report	Shevchenko 22'; Husyev 61'; I. Lima 69' (o.g.); Rakytskiy 80'; Seleznyov 81'; Yarmolenko 83'

Comunal, Andorra la Vella
Attendance: 820
Referee: Craig Thomson (Scotland)
14 October 2009
21:30 UTC+6

Kazakhstan	1–2	Croatia
Khizhnichenko 26'	Report	Vukojević 10'; Kranjčar 90+3'

Astana Arena, Astana
Attendance: 10,250
Referee: Claudio Circhetta (Switzerland)
14 October 2009
20:00 UTC+1

England	3–0	Belarus
Crouch 4', 76'; Wright-Phillips 60'	Report

Wembley Stadium, London
Attendance: 76,897
Referee: Lucilio Cardoso Cortez Batista (Portugal)

== Goalscorers ==
There were 107 goals scored in 30 matches, for an average of 3.57 goals per match.

9 goals

- (England) Wayne Rooney

6 goals

- (Ukraine) Andriy Shevchenko

5 goals

- (Belarus) Timofei Kalachev
- (Ukraine) Serhiy Nazarenko

4 goals

- (England) Peter Crouch
- (England) Frank Lampard

3 goals

- (Croatia) Eduardo
- (Croatia) Luka Modrić
- (Croatia) Ivica Olić
- (Croatia) Ivan Rakitić
- (England) Jermain Defoe
- (England) Steven Gerrard
- (England) Theo Walcott
- (Kazakhstan) Sergey Khizhnichenko
- (Kazakhstan) Sergei Ostapenko

2 goals

- (Belarus) Gennadi Bliznyuk
- (Belarus) Sergei Kornilenko
- (Belarus) Vitali Rodionov
- (Belarus) Dmitry Verkhovtsov
- (Croatia) Mladen Petrić
- (England) Joe Cole
- (Ukraine) Artem Milevskyi
- (Ukraine) Yevhen Seleznyov
- (Ukraine) Andriy Yarmolenko

1 goal

- (Andorra) Ildefons Lima
- (Andorra) Marc Pujol
- (Andorra) Oscar Sonejee
- (Belarus) Maksim Bardachov
- (Belarus) Alexander Hleb
- (Belarus) Vyacheslav Hleb
- (Belarus) Leonid Kovel
- (Belarus) Pavel Sitko
- (Belarus) Ihar Stasevich
- (Croatia) Ivan Klasnić
- (Croatia) Niko Kovač
- (Croatia) Niko Kranjčar
- (Croatia) Mario Mandžukić
- (Croatia) Ognjen Vukojević
- (England) Gareth Barry
- (England) Rio Ferdinand
- (England) Emile Heskey
- (England) John Terry
- (England) Shaun Wright-Phillips
- (Kazakhstan) Rinat Abdulin
- (Kazakhstan) Ruslan Baltiyev
- (Kazakhstan) Zhambyl Kukeyev
- (Kazakhstan) Tanat Nusserbayev
- (Kazakhstan) Roman Uzdenov
- (Ukraine) Oleksiy Gai
- (Ukraine) Oleh Husyev
- (Ukraine) Yaroslav Rakytskiy

1 own goal

- (Andorra) Ildefons Lima (against Ukraine)
- (Kazakhstan) Aleksandr Kuchma (against England)

== Attendances ==
Team	Highest	Lowest	Average
Andorra	10,300	510	2,666
Belarus	29,600	8,500	18,296
Croatia	35,218	14,441	24,957
England	89,107	57,897	79,753
Kazakhstan	24,000	7,700	15,590
Ukraine	38,500	11,500	23,974
