= Gennady Bliznyuk =

Belarusian footballer (born 1980)

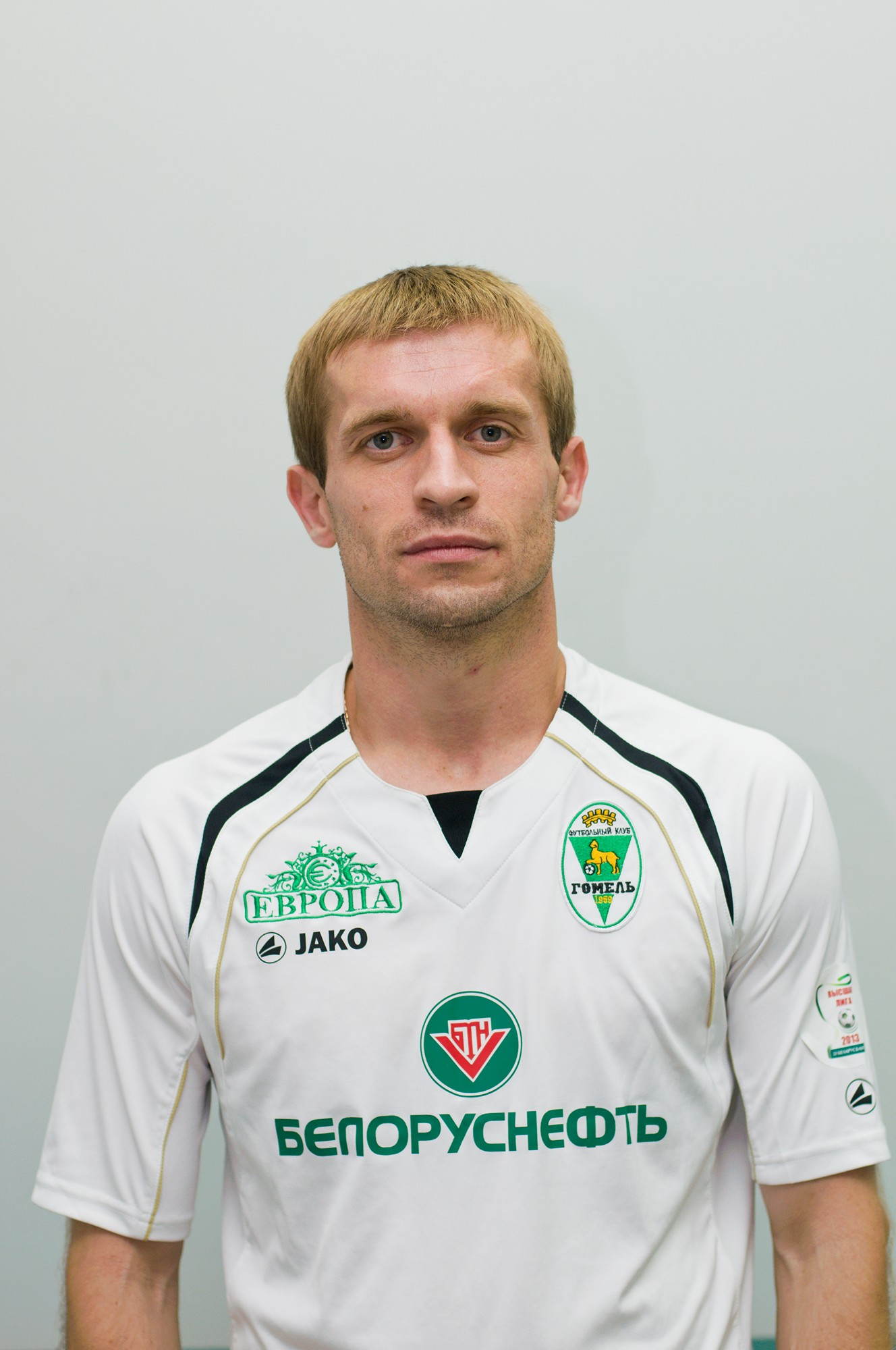

Personal information
- Full name: Gennady Petrovich Bliznyuk
- Date of birth: 30 July 1980 (age 46)
- Place of birth: Svietlahorsk, Belarusian SSR
- Height: 1.75 m (5 ft 9 in)
- Position: Forward

Youth career
- 1994–1997: Kommunalnik Svetlogorsk

Senior career*
Years	Team	Apps	(Gls)
1996	Energiya Zhlobin	8	(1)
1998	Kommunalnik Svetlogorsk	15	(6)
1999–2004	Gomel	126	(45)
2004–2005	Sokol Saratov	43	(10)
2005–2008	BATE Borisov	82	(50)
2009	FSV Frankfurt	10	(1)
2009–2010	Sibir Novosibirsk	20	(3)
2010	Belshina Bobruisk	9	(1)
2011	AZAL Baku	6	(2)
2011–2012	Belshina Bobruisk	40	(7)
2013–2015	Gomel	84	(21)
2016	Torpedo-BelAZ Zhodino	13	(0)
2016–2018	Isloch Minsk Raion	42	(5)
2018	Energetik-BGU Minsk	12	(3)
Total		510	(155)

International career
2000–2001	Belarus U21	5	(1)
2004–2009	Belarus	12	(4)

Managerial career
- 2019–2022: Energetik-BGU Minsk (assistant)
- * Club domestic league appearances and goals

Gennady Petrovich Bliznyuk (Belarusian: Генадзь Пятровіч Блізнюк; Russian: Геннадий Петрович Близнюк; born 30 July 1980) is a Belarusian football coach and former player. A former forward, he played in his native Belarus, in Russia, in Germany and Azerbaijan.

== Club career ==
Bliznyuk began his career at Energiya Zhlobin in 1996. In 2004, he joined Russian club Sokol Saratov, and in summer 2005 returned to Belarus and signed a contract with BATE Borisov. Bliznyuk was a starter for BATE Borisov during their successful 2008–09 UEFA Champions League campaign. He scored several important goals in the qualifying rounds, helping BATE to qualify to the group stage of the UEFA Champions League for the first time in their history. Bliznyuk participated in four of BATE's matches in the group stage. He left BATE on 13 January 2009 and signed a six-month contract with FSV Frankfurt.

== International career ==
Bliznyuk is a former member of Belarus national team.

== Career statistics ==
Scores and results list Belarus' goal tally first, score column indicates score after each Bliznyuk goal.

List of international goals scored by Gennadi Bliznyuk
No.	Date	Venue	Opponent	Score	Result	Competition
1	28 April 2004	Dinamo Stadium, Minsk, Belarus	Lithuania	1–0	1–0	Friendly
2	6 June 2009	Neman Stadium, Grodno, Belarus	Andorra	1–0	5–1	2010 FIFA World Cup qualification
3	6 June 2009	Neman Stadium, Grodno, Belarus	Andorra	5–0	5–1	2010 FIFA World Cup qualification
4	10 June 2009	Haradski Stadium, Barysaw, Belarus	Moldova	2–0	2–2	Friendly

== Honours ==
Gomel

- Belarusian Premier League: 2003
- Belarusian Cup: 2001–02

BATE Borisov

- Belarusian Premier League: 2006, 2007, 2008
- Belarusian Cup: 2005–06

Torpedo-BelAZ Zhodino

- Belarusian Cup: 2015–16

Individual

- Belarusian Premier League top scorer: 2003, 2008
