= Mikhail Martinovich =

Belarusian footballer and coach

Personal information
- Full name: Mikhail Alekseyevich Martinovich
- Date of birth: 14 September 1979 (age 47)
- Place of birth: Mazyr, Belarusian SSR
- Height: 1.79 m (5 ft 10 in)
- Position: Midfielder

Youth career
- 1996–1997: MPKC Mozyr

Senior career*
Years	Team	Apps	(Gls)
1996	Polesye Kozenki	7	(0)
1997–2003	Slavia Mozyr	40	(7)
1997–2000	→ Mozyr	90	(13)
2001	→ Zvezda-VA-BGU Minsk (loan)	25	(3)
2003–2004	Torpedo-SKA Minsk	37	(6)
2005–2010	Shakhtyor Soligorsk	110	(11)
2010	Granit Mikashevichi	14	(0)
2011–2012	Slavia Mozyr	29	(3)

International career
2000	Belarus U21	2	(0)

Managerial career
- 2013–2017: Slavia Mozyr (reserves)
- 2017–2022: Slavia Mozyr
- 2022: Slavia Mozyr (assistant)
- 2023: Akhmat Grozny (assistant)
- 2024: Belshina Bobruisk
- 2024–2025: Akhmat Grozny (assistant)
- 2025–2026: Maxline Vitebsk
- * Club domestic league appearances and goals

Mikhail Alekseyevich Martinovich (Belarusian: Міхаіл Аляксеевіч Марціновіч; Russian: Михаил Алексеевич Мартинович; born 14 September 1979) is a Belarusian professional football manager and former player.

== Honours ==
Shakhtyor Soligorsk

- Belarusian Premier League champion: 2005
