= Leu Mazurkevich =

Belarusian footballer and manager (1939–2019)

Personal information
- Date of birth: September 1939
- Place of birth: Khoiniki District, Belarusian SSR, Soviet Union
- Date of death: 4 February 2019 (aged 79)

Managerial career
- Years: Team
- 1973–1981: BATE Barysaw

Leu Mazurkevich (Belarusian: Леў Мазуркевіч; September 1939 – 4 February 2019) was a Belarusian footballer and football coach. He is the first coach in the history of Belarusian football club BATE Barysaw.
