= 2015 Belarusian Super Cup =

Shakhtyor Soligorsk	BATE Borisov
0	0
- BATE won 3–0 on penalties
- Date: 14 March 2015
- Venue: Volna Stadium, Pinsk
- Referee: Sergey Tsinkevich
- Attendance: 3,100

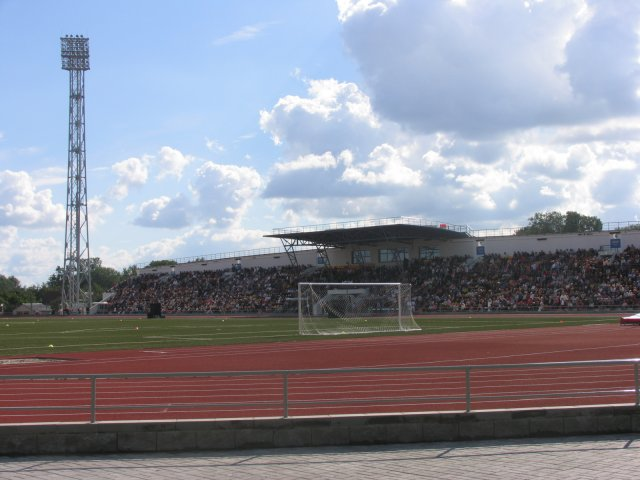
A picture of the venue, Stadium Volna

The 2015 Belarusian Super Cup was held on 14 March 2015 between the 2014 Belarusian Premier League champions BATE Borisov and the 2013–14 Belarusian Cup winners Shakhtyor Soligorsk. The match ended in a goalless draw at the conclusion of regulation time. BATE won the match 3–0 on penalties, taking the trophy for the fifth time.

== Match details ==
14 March 2015
15:00 UTC+3

Shakhtyor Soligorsk	0–0	BATE Borisov
	Report
Penalties
Kamarowski (penalty missed); Čović (penalty missed); Kuzmyanok (penalty missed)	0–3	(penalty scored) Gordeichuk; (penalty scored) Yablonskiy; (penalty scored) Stasevich

Volna Stadium, Pinsk
Attendance: 3,100
Referee: Sergey Tsinkevich (Osipovichi)

SHAKHTYOR:
GK	1	(Estonia) Artur Kotenko
DF	5	(Belarus) Alyaksandr Yurevich
DF	19	(Belarus) Ihar Kuzmyanok
DF	3	(Belarus) Syarhey Matsveychyk
DF	18	(Belarus) Pavel Rybak	(yellow card) 74'
MF	8	(Belarus) Mikhail Afanasyev		(substituted off) 52'
MF	13	(Lithuania) Saulius Mikoliūnas		(substituted off) 90+2'
MF	11	(Ukraine) Artem Starhorodskyi (c)
MF	20	(Ukraine) Yaroslav Martynyuk
FW	10	(Belarus) Mikalay Yanush	(yellow card) 34'	(substituted off) 72'
FW	15	(Belarus) Dzmitry Kamarowski
Substitutes:
GK	16	(Belarus) Uladzimir Bushma
DF	2	(Belarus) Mikhail Shibun
DF	4	(Belarus) Alyaksey Yanushkevich
FW	7	(Serbia) Nemanja Čović		(substituted on) 72'
MF	9	(Belarus) Kiryl Vyarheychyk		(substituted on) 90+2'
MF	14	(Ivory Coast) Taïna Adama Soro
MF	23	(Belarus) Yury Kavalyow		(substituted on) 52'
Manager:
(Belarus) Sergei Borovsky

BATE:
GK	16	(Belarus) Syarhey Chernik
DF	15	(Belarus) Maksim Zhavnerchik
DF	25	(Serbia) Filip Mladenović
DF	19	(Serbia) Nemanja Milunović
DF	33	(Belarus) Dzyanis Palyakow
MF	55	(Belarus) Dzmitry Baha	(substituted off) 63'
MF	5	(Belarus) Yevgeniy Yablonskiy
MF	62	(Belarus) Mikhail Gordeichuk
MF	7	(Belarus) Aleksandr Karnitsky
MF	22	(Belarus) Ihar Stasevich
FW	20	(Belarus) Vitali Rodionov (c)
Substitutes:
GK	34	(Belarus) Artem Soroko
MF	2	(Belarus) Dzmitry Likhtarovich
DF	4	(Latvia) Kaspars Dubra
MF	17	(Belarus) Alyaksey Ryas	(substituted on) 63'
FW	21	(Belarus) Vladislav Klimovich
MF	23	(Belarus) Edhar Alyakhnovich
DF	42	(Belarus) Maksim Volodko
Manager:
(Belarus) Alyaksandr Yermakovich

== See also ==
- 2014 Belarusian Premier League
- 2013–14 Belarusian Cup
