= Syarhey Kavalchuk =

Belarusian footballer

Personal information
- Date of birth: 9 October 1978 (age 48)
- Height: 1.82 m (5 ft 11 1/2 in)
- Position: Defender

Senior career*
Years	Team	Apps	(Gls)
1997–2003	Dinamo Minsk	161	(31)
2004–2005	SKA-Energiya Khabarovsk	31	(2)
2005–2010	Shakhtyor Soligorsk	116	(13)
2011–2012	Slavia-Mozyr	45	(4)
2013–2014	Smorgon	52	(0)
2015	Krumkachy Minsk	29	(2)

International career^{‡}
1998–1999	Belarus U21	6	(0)
2003	Belarus	3	(0)
- * Club domestic league appearances and goals as of 4 December 2015 ‡ National team caps and goals as of 1 June 2004

Syarhey Kavalchuk (Belarusian: Сяргей Кавальчук; Russian: Серге́й Владимирович Ковальчук; born 9 October 1978) is a retired Belarusian professional footballer. His latest club was Krumkachy Minsk in 2015.

== Honours ==
Dinamo Minsk

- Belarusian Premier League champion: 1997
- Belarusian Cup winner: 2002–03

Shakhtyor Soligorsk

- Belarusian Premier League champion: 2005
