= Ihar Hamlyak =

Belarusian footballer

Personal information
- Date of birth: 20 May 1988 (age 38)
- Place of birth: Minsk, Belarusian SSR
- Height: 1.94 m (6 ft 4 in)
- Position: Goalkeeper

Youth career
- 2002–2004: Dinamo Minsk
- 2005–2006: Shakhtyor Soligorsk

Senior career*
Years	Team	Apps	(Gls)
2006–2009	Shakhtyor Soligorsk	8	(0)
2010–2011	Baranovichi	28	(0)
2011	Naftan Novopolotsk	0	(0)
2012	Granit Mikashevichi	28	(0)
2013	Gorodeya	12	(0)
2014–2016	Granit Mikashevichi	2	(0)
- * Club domestic league appearances and goals as of 1 December 2016

Ihar Hamlyak (Belarusian: Ігар Хамляк; Russian: Игорь Хомляк; born 20 May 1988) is a Belarusian former professional footballer.
