= Andrey Kazaryn =

Belarusian footballer

Personal information
- Date of birth: 27 October 1984 (age 42)
- Place of birth: Pinsk, Brest Oblast, Byelorussian SSR, Soviet Union
- Height: 1.83 m (6 ft 0 in)
- Position: Midfielder

Team information
- Current team: Krumkachy Minsk

Senior career*
Years	Team	Apps	(Gls)
2002–2003	Pinsk-900	25	(5)
2003–2005	Torpedo-SKA Minsk	26	(5)
2006	Belshina Bobruisk	2	(0)
2007	Sakhalin Yuzhno-Sakhalinsk	29	(3)
2008–2009	Smorgon	22	(2)
2009	Neman Grodno	10	(0)
2010	Torpedo Zhodino	14	(0)
2011	Gorodeya	3	(0)
2011	SKVICH Minsk	12	(0)
2012	Dnepr Mogilev	16	(0)
2014–2017	Volna Pinsk	72	(5)
2018–2019	Uzda	19	(2)
2020–2021	Stenles Pinsk	18	(0)
2022	Krumkachy Minsk	0	(0)

Managerial career
- 2021: Stenles Pinsk
- * Club domestic league appearances and goals as of 31 December 2022

Andrey Kazaryn (Belarusian: Андрэй Казарын; Russian: Андрей Казарин; born 27 October 1984) is a Belarusian professional footballer who plays for Krumkachy Minsk.

== Career ==
Born in Pinsk, Kazaryn has played in the Belarusian Premier League with FC Belshina Bobruisk, FC Smorgon, FC Neman Grodno and FC Torpedo Zhodino.
