= Alyaksey Paznyak =

Belarusian footballer

Personal information
- Date of birth: 16 April 1981 (age 45)
- Place of birth: Vitebsk, Byelorussian SSR, Soviet Union
- Position: Defender

Youth career
- 1998–1999: Lokomotiv-96 Vitebsk

Senior career*
Years	Team	Apps	(Gls)
1998–2002	Lokomotiv-96 Vitebsk	87	(4)
1998–2000	→ Lokomotiv Vitebsk (loan)	20	(3)
2003	Molodechno-2000	15	(0)
2003	MTZ-RIPO Minsk	15	(1)
2004	Torpedo Zhodino	10	(0)
2005	Lokomotiv Vitebsk	29	(2)
2006	Mozyr-ZLiN	24	(1)
2007–2011	Khimik Svetlogorsk	118	(1)
2012–2014	Vitebsk	70	(0)
2021–2022	Gorodok Lions	13	(0)
- * Club domestic league appearances and goals as of 31 December 2022

Alyaksey Paznyak (Belarusian: Аляксей Пазняк; Russian: Алексей Позняк; born 16 April 1981) is a retired Belarusian professional football player.
