= Artsyom Kosak =

Belarusian footballer and coach

Personal information
- Date of birth: 22 February 1977 (age 49)
- Height: 1.76 m (5 ft 9 1/2 in)
- Position: Defender

Team information
- Current team: Maxline Vitebsk (assistant coach)

Senior career*
Years	Team	Apps	(Gls)
1995	Dvina-Belkon Novopolotsk	11	(0)
1996–1997	Lokomotiv Vitebsk	33	(0)
1997–2002	Lokomotiv-96 Vitebsk	70	(2)
1998–2000	→ Lokomotiv Vitebsk	28	(1)
2002–2003	MTZ-RIPO Minsk	27	(1)
2003	Molodechno-2000	15	(0)
2004–2005	Slavia Mozyr	46	(1)
2006–2012	Vitebsk	120	(1)
2013–2014	Vitebsk-2	15	(0)
2021	Prodtsentr Vitebsk	4	(0)
2023	Gorodok Lions	3	(0)

Managerial career
- 2014: Vitebsk-2
- 2023–2025: Vitebsk (assistant)
- 2025: Vitebsk (caretaker)
- 2026–: Maxline Vitebsk (assistant)
- * Club domestic league appearances and goals as of 31 December 2021

Artsyom Kosak (Belarusian: Арцём Косак; Russian: Артём Косак; born 22 February 1977) is a retired Belarusian professional footballer and coach.

== Honours ==
Lokomotiv-96 Vitebsk

- Belarusian Cup winner: 1997–98
