= Victor Trotsyuk =

Belarusian footballer

Personal information
- Date of birth: 27 May 1984 (age 42)
- Place of birth: Brest, Belarusian SSR
- Height: 1.87 m (6 ft 1 1/2 in)
- Position: Forward

Youth career
- SDYuShOR-5 Brest

Senior career*
Years	Team	Apps	(Gls)
2001–2003	Slavia Mozyr	30	(2)
2004	Dinamo Brest	4	(0)
2005	Bereza	29	(9)
2006	Volna Pinsk	12	(2)
2006–2007	Dinamo Brest	14	(0)
2008	Minsk	25	(10)
2009–2010	Baranovichi	36	(1)
2021–2023	Niva Dolbizno	27	(11)
- * Club domestic league appearances and goals as of 31 December 2023

Victor Trotsyuk (born 27 May 1984) is a Belarusian retired footballer. He played for clubs such as FC Slavia Mozyr and FC Dinamo Brest in the Belarusian Premier League.

== Honours ==
Dinamo Brest

- Belarusian Cup winner: 2006–07
