= Alyaksandr Klimenka =

Belarusian footballer

Personal information
- Date of birth: 28 March 1983 (age 43)
- Place of birth: Belarusian SSR
- Height: 1.81 m (5 ft 11 in)
- Position: Forward

Youth career
- SDYuShOR-3 Mozyr

Senior career*
Years	Team	Apps	(Gls)
1999–2000	Mozyr	24	(9)
2001–2003	Slavia Mozyr	41	(13)
2003	Baltika Kaliningrad	9	(0)
2004	Slavia Mozyr	27	(10)
2005–2008	Shakhtyor Soligorsk	81	(44)
2009–2010	Gomel	34	(7)
2011–2012	Slavia Mozyr	29	(4)
2022	Vertikal Kalinkovichi	13	(7)

International career^{‡}
2002–2005	Belarus U21	8	(0)
2007	Belarus	1	(0)

Managerial career
- 2013–: Slavia Mozyr (youth)
- * Club domestic league appearances and goals as of 4 December 2012 ‡ National team caps and goals as of 26 March 2007

Alyaksandr Klimenka (Belarusian: Аляксандр Кліменка; Russian: Александр Клименко; born 28 March 1983) is a retired Belarusian footballer (forward). Since 2013 he is a youth squad coach for his last club Slavia Mozyr. He has been called up to Belarus national football team.

== Honours ==
Gomel

- Belarusian Cup winner: 2010–11

Individual

- Belarusian Premier League top scorer: 2006
