= Yunost Stadium (Smorgon) =

Football stadium in Smorgon, Belarus

Youth Stadium
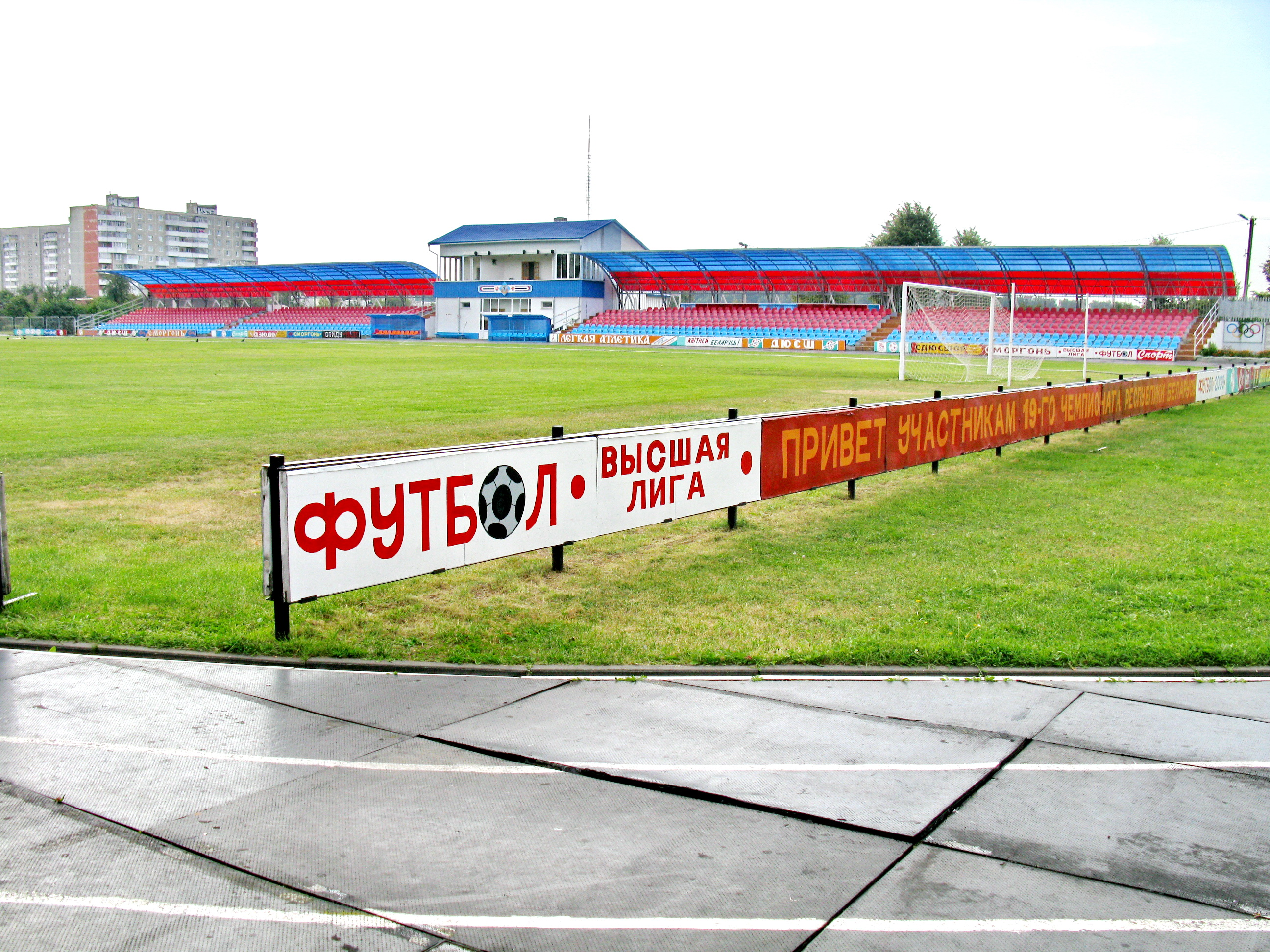
- Interactive map of Youth Stadium
- Location: Smarhon, Belarus
- Coordinates: 54°28′44.29″N 26°24′15.97″E
- Owner: FC Smorgon
- Operator: FC Smorgon
- Capacity: 3,500
- Surface: Grass

Tenant
- FC Smorgon

Youth Stadium or Yunatstva Stadium (Belarusian: Стадыён «Юнацтва») or Yunost Stadium (Russian: Юность) is a football stadium in Smarhon (Smorgon), Belarus. It is the home stadium of FC Smorgon of the Belarusian Premier League. The stadium holds 3,500 spectators.
