= FC BATE Borisov =

Belarusian professional football club

BATE Borisov
- Full name: Футбольны клуб БАТЭ; Футбольный клуб БАТЭ; Football Club BATE Borisov
- Nickname: Zholto-Sinie (Yellow-Blues)
- Founded: 1973 (53 years ago)
- Ground: Borisov Arena
- Capacity: 13,126
- Chairman: Andrei Kapski
- Head coach: Artyom Kulikov (caretaker)
- League: Belarusian Premier League
- 2025: Belarusian Premier League, 10th of 16
- Website: fcbate.by
Home colours	Away colours

FC BATE Borisov (Russian: ФК БАТЭ Борисов, FK BATE Borisov [bɐˈtɛ bɐˈrʲisəf]; Belarusian: ФК БАТЭ Барысаў, BATE Barysaw, IPA: [baˈtɛ]), commonly referred to as BATE or BATE Borisov, is a Belarusian professional football team from the city of Barysaw. The club competes in the Belarusian Premier League, of which they are the league's most successful club with 15 titles, including 13 won consecutively. The club has also won four Belarusian Cups and four Belarusian Super Cups.

BATE is the only Belarusian team to have qualified for the group stage of the UEFA Champions League (2008–09, 2011–12, 2012–13, 2014–15 and 2015–16) and one of two to qualify for the group stage of the UEFA Europa League (2009–10, 2010–11, 2017–18 and 2018–19), along with Dinamo Minsk.

The club's home stadium is Borisov Arena, which was opened in 2014.

== History ==
BATE is an acronym of Borisov Automobile and Tractor Electronics. The team was founded in 1973 and managed to win Belarusian Soviet Socialist Republic league three times (1974, 1976 and 1979) before being disbanded in 1984. The club was re-established by Anatoli Kapski in 1996. Since then, BATE have won the Belarusian Premier League 15 times and competed in UEFA competitions.

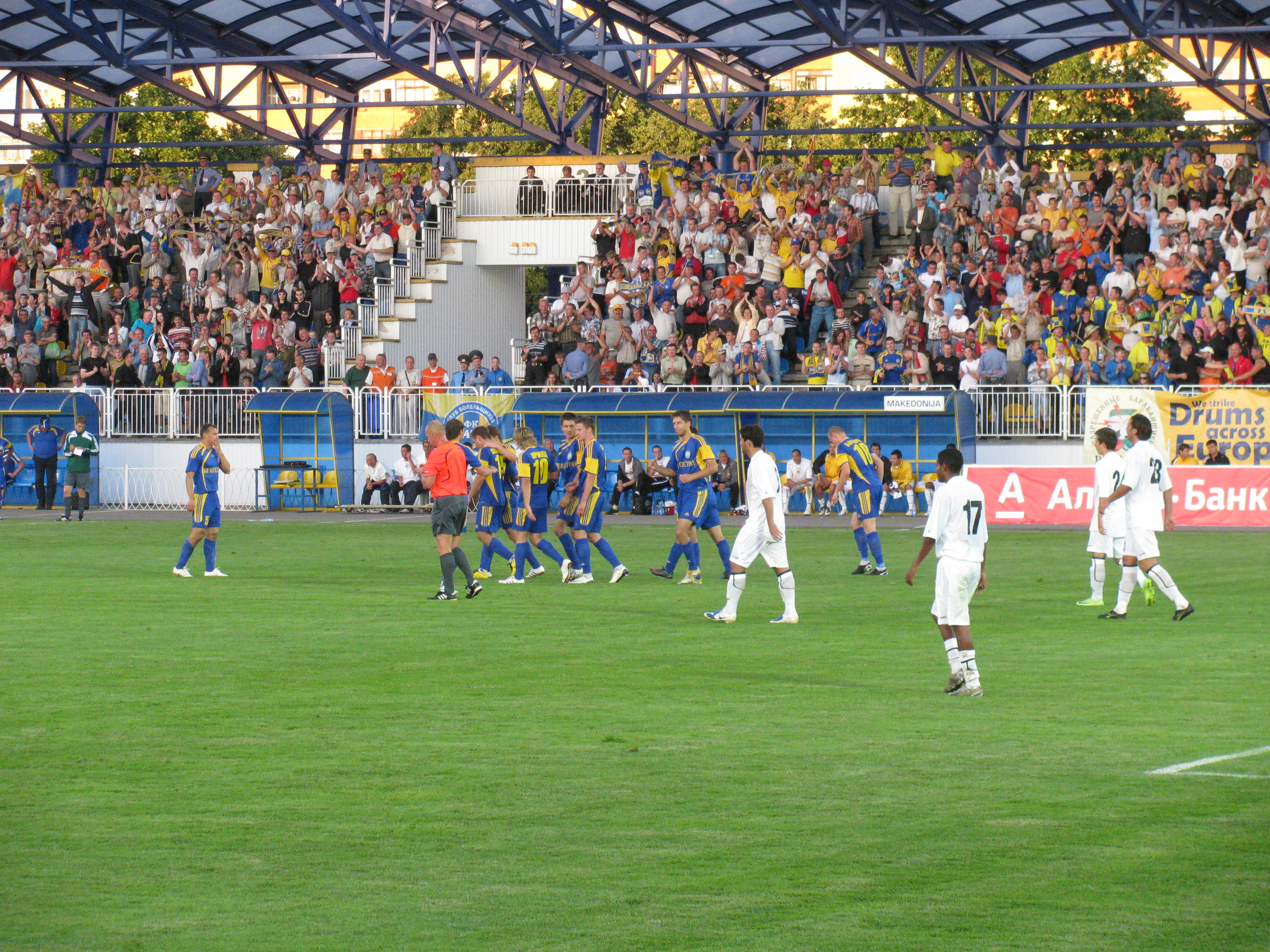
BATE playing at the Haradski Stadium in July 2009

In 2001, BATE reached the first round of the UEFA Cup, their first appearance in the competition beyond the qualifying rounds. 2008 saw BATE becoming the first Belarusian team to qualify for the group stages of the UEFA Champions League. As of 2015, BATE have played five times in the Champions League group stage, as well as twice in UEFA Europa League group stage, also reaching the knockout phase of the latter competition in 2010–11 and 2012–13.

Notable former players of BATE include Alexander Hleb (VfB Stuttgart, Arsenal, Barcelona and Birmingham City); Vitali Kutuzov (Milan, Sporting CP, Avellino, Sampdoria, Parma, Pisa and Bari) and Yuri Zhevnov (FC Moscow, and Zenit Saint Petersburg). Having started their professional careers with BATE, all are also former or present members of the Belarus national team.

BATE won their tenth consecutive league title in 2015, with four matches to spare. In the 2017 season, BATE drew an average home league attendance of 5,633, the second-highest in the league.

== Supporters ==
BATE Borisov is one of the most popular football teams in Belarus. BATE fans have developed a rivalry with the fans of Dinamo Minsk and a friendship with fans of Polish club Piast Gliwice since 2011.

== Current squad ==
As of 1 September, 2026

Note: Flags indicate national team as defined under FIFA eligibility rules; some limited exceptions apply. Players may hold more than one non-FIFA nationality.

No.	Pos.	Nation	Player
5	DF	BLR	Maksim Sakuta
6	DF	BLR	Ayk Musakhanyan
7	MF	CIV	Victorien Angban
8	FW	BLR	Kirill Apanasevich
10	MF	BLR	Egor Rusakov
11	MF	BLR	Egor Grivenev
13	MF	RUS	Yaroslav Khramtsevich
14	MF	BLR	Maksim Telesh
16	GK	BLR	Danila Sokol
17	MF	BLR	Yury Kavalyow
19	FW	MNE	Luka Djordjevic
21	FW	BLR	Marat Titov
23	DF	RUS	Nikolai Bochko
24	FW	BLR	Vladislav Yatskevich

No.	Pos.	Nation	Player
25	DF	BLR	Nikita Neskoromnyi
26	MF	BLR	Vladislav Varaksa
28	DF	BLR	Ivan Mikhnyuk (on loan from Slutsk)
30	MF	RUS	Taras Gagloev
33	DF	BLR	Artsyom Rakhmanaw
35	GK	BLR	Arseniy Skopets
37	FW	HON	Erick Puerto (on loan from Platense)
42	DF	RUS	Andrey Zhurin
47	MF	BLR	Ales Sakhonchik
51	GK	RUS	Aleksandr Ryabinkin
52	DF	BLR	Egor Kress
55	MF	BLR	Kirill Kaplenko
88	DF	BLR	Pavel Dubovskiy
—	MF	BLR	Platon Kolosovskiy

=== Out on loan ===
Note: Flags indicate national team as defined under FIFA eligibility rules; some limited exceptions apply. Players may hold more than one non-FIFA nationality.

No.	Pos.	Nation	Player
9	FW	BLR	Nikolay Mirskiy (at Unixlabs Minsk)
44	FW	BLR	Maksim Mardas (at Gomel)
—	MF	BLR	Arseniy Blotskiy (at Slutsk)

No.	Pos.	Nation	Player
—	DF	BLR	Ivan Chernykh (at Molodechno)
—	MF	BLR	Yaroslav Kulesh (at Orsha)
—	DF	BLR	Andrey Shkondin (at Slutsk)

== Honours ==
- Belarusian Premier League
  - Winners (15): 1999, 2002, 2006, 2007, 2008, 2009, 2010, 2011, 2012, 2013, 2014, 2015, 2016, 2017, 2018
  - Runners-up (7): 1998, 2000, 2003, 2004, 2019, 2020, 2021
- Belarusian Cup
  - Winners (6): 2005–06, 2009–10, 2014–15, 2019–20, 2020–21, 2025–26
  - Runners-up (7): 2001–02, 2004–05, 2006–07, 2015–16, 2017–18, 2021–22, 2022–23
- Belarusian Super Cup
  - Winners (8): 2010, 2011, 2013, 2014, 2015, 2016, 2017, 2022
  - Runners-up (4): 2012, 2018, 2019, 2021
- Belarusian Second League
  - Winners: 1996
- Football Championship of the Belarusian SSR
  - Winners (3): 1974, 1976, 1979

== Kit suppliers and shirt sponsors ==
Period	Kit manufacturer	Shirt sponsor
1996–98	Adidas	Stalker
1999	Beltona	Stalker
2000–01	Diadora	Zhuravinka
2002–05	Adidas	Xerox
2005–13	Adidas	Belgosstrah
2014–16	Joma	Belgosstrah
2017	Adidas	Belgosstrah
2018–21	Adidas	Minsk Tractor Works
2022–23	Adidas	Fonbet
2023–	Puma	Fonbet

== League and Cup history ==
Season	Level	Pos	Pld	W	D	L	GF	GA	Points	Domestic Cup	Notes
1996	3rd	1st	28	25	2	1	79	10	77		Promoted
1997	2nd	2nd	30	25	3	2	92	15	78	Round of 32	Promoted
1998	1st	2nd	28	18	4	6	50	25	58	Quarter-finals	
1999	1st	1st	30	24	5	1	80	22	77	Semi-finals	
2000	1st	2nd	30	20	4	6	68	26	64	Round of 16	
2001	1st	3rd	26	16	3	7	54	31	51	Quarter-finals	
2002	1st	1st	27^{1}	19	2	6	52	20	59	Runners-up	
2003	1st	2nd	30	20	6	4	70	21	66	Quarter-finals	
2004	1st	2nd	30	22	4	4	59	25	70	Semi-finals	
2005	1st	5th	26	12	11	3	42	27	47	Runners-up	
2006	1st	1st	26	16	6	4	47	27	54	Winners	
2007	1st	1st	26	18	2	6	50	25	56	Runners-up	
2008	1st	1st	30	19	10	1	54	20	67	Semi-finals	
2009	1st	1st	26	19	5	2	55	16	62	Semi-finals	
2010	1st	1st	33	21	9	3	64	18	72	Winners	
2011	1st	1st	33	18	12	3	53	20	66	Round of 16	
2012	1st	1st	30	21	5	4	51	16	68	Round of 16	
2013	1st	1st	32	21	4	7	61	25	67	Round of 16	
2014	1st	1st	32	20	11	1	68	21	71	Quarter-finals	
2015	1st	1st	26	20	5	1	44	11	65	Winners	
2016	1st	1st	30	22	4	4	73	25	70	Runners-up	
2017	1st	1st	30	21	5	4	61	19	68	Semi-finals	
2018	1st	1st	30	23	4	3	55	24	73	Runners-up	
2019	1st	2nd	30	22	4	4	61	21	70	Quarter-finals	
2020	1st	2nd	30	17	7	6	65	32	58	Winners	
2021	1st	2nd	30	19	8	3	61	27	65	Winners	
2022	1st	3rd	30	16	11	3	51	21	59	Runners-up	
2023	1st	5th	28	14	5	9	49	32	47	Quarter-finals	
2024	1st	8th	30	11	7	12	38	38	40	Round of 16	
2025	1st	10th	30	11	7	12	38	43	40		

- ^{1} Including play-off (1–0 win) for the first place against Neman Grodno, as both teams finished with equal points.

== European record ==
Season	Competition	Round		Club	1st Leg	2nd Leg
1999–2000	UEFA Cup	QR	(Russia)	Lokomotiv Moscow	1–7 (H)	0–5 (A)
2000–01	UEFA Champions League	1Q	(Armenia)	Shirak	1–1 (A)	2–1 (H)
2000–01	UEFA Champions League	2Q	(Sweden)	Helsingborgs IF	0–0 (A)	0–3 (H)
2001–02	UEFA Cup	Q	(Georgia (country))	Dinamo Tbilisi	1–2 (A)	4–0 (H)
2001–02	UEFA Cup	1R	(Italy)	Milan	0–2 (H)	0–4 (A)
2002	UEFA Intertoto Cup	1R	(Denmark)	AB	1–0 (H)	2–0 (A)
2002	UEFA Intertoto Cup	2R	(Germany)	1860 Munich	1–0 (A)	4–0 (H)
2002	UEFA Intertoto Cup	3R	(Italy)	Bologna	0–2 (A)	0–0 (H)
2003–04	UEFA Champions League	1Q	(Republic of Ireland)	Bohemians	1–0 (H)	0–3 (A)
2004–05	UEFA Cup	1Q	(Georgia (country))	Dinamo Tbilisi	2–3 (H)	0–1 (A)
2005–06	UEFA Cup	1Q	(Georgia (country))	Torpedo Kutaisi	1–0 (A)	5–0 (H)
2005–06	UEFA Cup	2Q	(Russia)	Krylia Sovetov Samara	0–2 (A)	0–2 (H)
2006–07	UEFA Cup	1Q	(Moldova)	Nistru Otaci	2–0 (H)	1–0 (A)
2006–07	UEFA Cup	2Q	(Russia)	Rubin Kazan	0–3 (A)	0–2 (H)
2007–08	UEFA Champions League	1Q	(Cyprus)	APOEL	0–2 (A)	3–0 (a.e.t.) (H)
2007–08	UEFA Champions League	2Q	(Iceland)	FH Hafnarfjördur	3–1 (A)	1–1 (H)
2007–08	UEFA Champions League	3Q	(Romania)	Steaua București	2–2 (H)	0–2 (A)
2007–08	UEFA Cup	1R	(Spain)	Villarreal	1–4 (A)	2–0 (H)
2008–09	UEFA Champions League	1Q	(Iceland)	Valur	2–0 (H)	1–0 (A)
2008–09	UEFA Champions League	2Q	(Belgium)	Anderlecht	2–1 (A)	2–2 (H)
2008–09	UEFA Champions League	3Q	(Bulgaria)	Levski Sofia	1–0 (A)	1–1 (H)
2008–09	UEFA Champions League	Group H	(Spain)	Real Madrid	0–2 (A)	0–1 (H)
2008–09	UEFA Champions League	Group H	(Italy)	Juventus	2–2 (H)	0–0 (A)
2008–09	UEFA Champions League	Group H	(Russia)	Zenit Saint Petersburg	1–1 (A)	0–2 (H)
2009–10	UEFA Champions League	2Q	(North Macedonia)	Makedonija Gjorče Petrov	2–0 (A)	2–0 (H)
2009–10	UEFA Champions League	3Q	(Latvia)	Ventspils	0–1 (A)	2–1 (H)
2009–10	UEFA Europa League	Play-off	(Bulgaria)	Litex Lovech	0–1 (H)	4–0 (a.e.t.) (A)
2009–10	UEFA Europa League	Group I	(Portugal)	Benfica	0–2 (A)	1–2 (H)
2009–10	UEFA Europa League	Group I	(England)	Everton	1–2 (H)	1–0 (A)
2009–10	UEFA Europa League	Group I	(Greece)	AEK Athens	2–1 (H)	2–2 (A)
2010–11	UEFA Champions League	2Q	(Iceland)	FH Hafnarfjörður	5–1 (H)	1–0 (A)
2010–11	UEFA Champions League	3Q	(Denmark)	Copenhagen	0–0 (H)	2–3 (A)
2010–11	UEFA Europa League	Play-off	(Portugal)	Marítimo	3–0 (H)	2–1 (A)
2010–11	UEFA Europa League	Group E	(Ukraine)	Dynamo Kyiv	2–2 (A)	1–4 (H)
2010–11	UEFA Europa League	Group E	(Netherlands)	AZ	4–1 (H)	0–3 (A)
2010–11	UEFA Europa League	Group E	(Moldova)	Sheriff Tiraspol	1–0 (A)	3–1 (H)
2010–11	UEFA Europa League	R32	(France)	Paris Saint-Germain	2–2 (H)	0–0 (A)
2011–12	UEFA Champions League	2Q	(Northern Ireland)	Linfield	1–1 (A)	2–0 (H)
2011–12	UEFA Champions League	3Q	(Lithuania)	Ekranas	0–0 (A)	3–1 (H)
2011–12	UEFA Champions League	Play-off	(Austria)	Sturm Graz	1–1 (H)	2–0 (A)
2011–12	UEFA Champions League	Group H	(Czech Republic)	Viktoria Plzeň	1–1 (A)	0–1 (H)
2011–12	UEFA Champions League	Group H	(Spain)	Barcelona	0–5 (H)	0–4 (A)
2011–12	UEFA Champions League	Group H	(Italy)	Milan	0–2 (A)	1–1 (H)
2012–13	UEFA Champions League	2Q	(North Macedonia)	Vardar	3–2 (H)	0–0 (A)
2012–13	UEFA Champions League	3Q	(Hungary)	Debrecen	1–1 (H)	2–0 (A)
2012–13	UEFA Champions League	Play-off	(Israel)	Ironi Kiryat Shmona	2–0 (H)	1–1 (A)
2012–13	UEFA Champions League	Group F	(France)	Lille	3–1 (A)	0–2 (H)
2012–13	UEFA Champions League	Group F	(Germany)	Bayern Munich	3–1 (H)	1–4 (A)
2012–13	UEFA Champions League	Group F	(Spain)	Valencia	0–3 (H)	2–4 (A)
2012–13	UEFA Europa League	R32	(Turkey)	Fenerbahçe	0–0 (H)	0–1 (A)
2013–14	UEFA Champions League	2Q	(Kazakhstan)	Shakhter Karagandy	0–1 (H)	0–1 (A)
2014–15	UEFA Champions League	2Q	(Albania)	Skënderbeu	0–0 (H)	1–1 (A)
2014–15	UEFA Champions League	3Q	(Hungary)	Debrecen	0–1 (A)	3–1 (H)
2014–15	UEFA Champions League	Play-off	(Slovakia)	Slovan Bratislava	1–1 (A)	3–0 (H)
2014–15	UEFA Champions League	Group H	(Portugal)	Porto	0–6 (A)	0–3 (H)
2014–15	UEFA Champions League	Group H	(Spain)	Athletic Bilbao	2–1 (H)	0–2 (A)
2014–15	UEFA Champions League	Group H	(Ukraine)	Shakhtar Donetsk	0–7 (H)	0–5 (A)
2015–16	UEFA Champions League	2Q	(Republic of Ireland)	Dundalk	2–1 (H)	0–0 (A)
2015–16	UEFA Champions League	3Q	(Hungary)	Videoton	1–1 (A)	1–0 (H)
2015–16	UEFA Champions League	Play-off	(Serbia)	Partizan	1–0 (H)	1–2 (A)
2015–16	UEFA Champions League	Group E	(Germany)	Bayer Leverkusen	1–4 (A)	1–1 (H)
2015–16	UEFA Champions League	Group E	(Italy)	Roma	3–2 (H)	0–0 (A)
2015–16	UEFA Champions League	Group E	(Spain)	Barcelona	0–2 (H)	0–3 (A)
2016–17	UEFA Champions League	2Q	(Finland)	SJK	2–0 (H)	2–2 (A)
2016–17	UEFA Champions League	3Q	(Republic of Ireland)	Dundalk	1–0 (H)	0–3 (A)
2016–17	UEFA Europa League	Play-off	(Kazakhstan)	Astana	0–2 (A)	2–2 (H)
2017–18	UEFA Champions League	2Q	(Armenia)	Alashkert	1–1 (H)	3–1 (A)
2017–18	UEFA Champions League	3Q	(Czech Republic)	Slavia Prague	0–1 (A)	2–1 (H)
2017–18	UEFA Europa League	Play-off	(Ukraine)	Oleksandriya	1–1 (H)	2–1 (A)
2017–18	UEFA Europa League	Group H	(Serbia)	Red Star Belgrade	1–1 (A)	0–0 (H)
2017–18	UEFA Europa League	Group H	(England)	Arsenal	2–4 (H)	0–6 (A)
2017–18	UEFA Europa League	Group H	(Germany)	Köln	1–0 (H)	2–5 (A)
2018–19	UEFA Champions League	2Q	(Finland)	HJK	0–0 (H)	2–1 (A)
2018–19	UEFA Champions League	3Q	(Azerbaijan)	Qarabağ	1–0 (A)	1–1 (H)
2018–19	UEFA Champions League	Play-off	(Netherlands)	PSV Eindhoven	2–3 (H)	0–3 (A)
2018–19	UEFA Europa League	Group L	(Hungary)	MOL Vidi	2–0 (A)	2–0 (H)
2018–19	UEFA Europa League	Group L	(Greece)	PAOK	1–4 (H)	3–1 (A)
2018–19	UEFA Europa League	Group L	(England)	Chelsea	1–3 (A)	0–1 (H)
2018–19	UEFA Europa League	R32	(England)	Arsenal	1–0 (H)	0–3 (A)
2019–20	UEFA Champions League	1Q	(Poland)	Piast Gliwice	1−1 (H)	2−1 (A)
2019–20	UEFA Champions League	2Q	(Norway)	Rosenborg	2−1 (H)	0−2 (A)
2019–20	UEFA Europa League	3Q	(Bosnia and Herzegovina)	Sarajevo	2−1 (A)	0−0 (H)
2019–20	UEFA Europa League	Play-off	(Kazakhstan)	Astana	0−3 (A)	2−0 (H)
2020–21	UEFA Europa League	2Q	(Bulgaria)	CSKA Sofia	0−2 (A)	—N/a
2021–22	UEFA Europa Conference League	2Q	(Georgia (country))	Dinamo Batumi	1–0 (A)	1–4 (H)
2022–23	UEFA Europa Conference League	2Q	(Turkey)	Konyaspor	0–3 (H)	0–2 (A)
2023–24	UEFA Champions League	1Q	(Albania)	Partizani	1–1 (A)	2−0 (H)
2023–24	UEFA Champions League	2Q	(Cyprus)	Aris Limassol	2–6 (A)	3−5 (H)
2023–24	UEFA Europa League	3Q	(Moldova)	Sheriff Tiraspol	1–5 (A)	2−2 (H)
2023–24	UEFA Europa Conference League	Play-off	(Kosovo)	Ballkani	1–4 (A)	1−0 (H)
2026–27	UEFA Conference League	1Q	(Albania)	Elbasani	1–1 (A)	0–0 (a.e.t),(4–5p) (H)
2026–27	UEFA Conference League	2Q	(Switzerland)	Sion		

== Managers ==
- (Soviet Union) Leu Mazurkevich (1973–1981)
- (Belarus) Yury Puntus (1 March 1996 – 30 November 2004)
- (Belarus) Igor Kriushenko (1 January 2005 – 12 November 2007)
- (Belarus) Viktor Goncharenko (13 November 2007 – 12 October 2013)
- (Belarus) Alyaksandr Yermakovich (12 October 2013 – 31 December 2017)
- (Belarus) Oleg Dulub (5 January 2018 – 3 June 2018)
- (Belarus) Aleksey Baga (4 June 2018 – 19 December 2019)
- (Belarus) Kirill Alshevsky (1 January 2020 – 22 September 2020)
- (Belarus) Aleksandr Lisovsky (22 September 2020 – 31 December 2020)
- (Belarus) Vitaly Zhukovsky (1 January 2021 – 30 December 2021)
- (Belarus) Aleksandr Mikhailov (10 January 2022 – 16 August 2022)
- (Belarus) Sergey Zenevich (17 August 2022 – 9 October 2022)
- (Belarus) Kirill Alshevsky (10 October 2022 – 2023)
