= 2006 Belarusian Premier League =

Belarusian Premier League
- Season: 2006
- Champions: BATE Borisov
- Relegated: Lokomotiv Minsk; Belshina Bobruisk
- Champions League: BATE Borisov
- UEFA Cup: Dinamo Brest; Dinamo Minsk
- Intertoto Cup: Shakhtyor Soligorsk
- Matches: 182
- Goals: 450 (2.47 per match)
- Top goalscorer: (Belarus) Alyaksandr Klimenka (17)
- Biggest home win: MTZ-RIPO 7–1 Lokomotiv Minsk
- Biggest away win: Gomel 2–8 MTZ-RIPO
- Highest scoring: Gomel 2–8 MTZ-RIPO

The 2006 Belarusian Premier League was the 16th season of top-tier football in Belarus. It started on April 18 and ended on November 4, 2005. Shakhtyor Soligorsk were the defending champions.

== Team changes from 2005 season ==
Two lowest placed in 2004 teams (Zvezda-BGU Minsk and Slavia) relegated to First League. They were replaced by the winners of 2005 First League Belshina Bobruisk and First League runners-up Lokomotiv Vitebsk. Dnepr-Transmash Mogilev shortened their name to Dnepr Mogilev.

== Overview ==
BATE Borisov won their 3rd champions title and qualified for the next season's Champions League. The championship runners-up Dinamo Minsk and 2006–07 Cup winners Dinamo Brest qualified for UEFA Cup. Lokomotiv Minsk and Belshina Bobruisk, who finished on last two places, relegated to the First League.

== Teams and venues ==
Location of teams in 2006 Belarusian Premier League

Team	Location	Venue	Capacity	Position in 2005
Shakhtyor	Soligorsk	Stroitel Stadium	4,200	1
Dinamo Minsk	Minsk	Dinamo Stadium	40,000	2
MTZ-RIPO	Minsk	Traktor Stadium	17,600	3
Torpedo	Zhodino	Torpedo Stadium (Zhodino)	3,020	4
BATE	Borisov	City Stadium (Borisov)	5,500	5
Dnepr	Mogilev	Spartak Stadium (Mogilev)	6,800	6
Gomel	Gomel	Central Stadium	15,000	7
Dinamo Brest	Brest	OSK Brestskiy	10,080	8
Naftan	Novopolotsk	Atlant Stadium	4,500	9
Darida	Minsk Raion	Darida Stadium	3,300	10
Lokomotiv Minsk	Minsk	City Stadium (Molodechno)	4,800	11
Neman	Grodno	Neman Stadium	6,300	12
Belshina	Bobruisk	Spartak Stadium (Bobruisk)	3,700	First league, 1
Lokomotiv Vitebsk	Vitebsk	Vitebsky CSK	8,350	First league, 2

1. Due to renovation works at Stroitel Stadium, Shakhtyor played three games at Torpedo Stadium in Minsk and three games at City Stadium in Lyuban.
2. Lokomotiv Minsk spent the season at City Stadium in Molodechno, as their own ground Lokomotiv Stadium did not meet Premier League criteria.
3. Due to renovation works at Neman Stadium, Neman played six games at Yunost Stadium in Smorgon and one game at Traktor Stadium in Minsk.
4. Due to renovation works in Bobruisk, Belshina played one game at Spartak Stadium in Mogilev and one game at City Stadium in Lyuban.

== Table ==
Pos	Team	Pld	W	D	L	GF	GA	GD	Pts	Qualification or relegation
1	BATE Borisov (C)	26	16	6	4	47	27	+20	54	Qualification for Champions League first qualifying round
2	Dinamo Minsk	26	15	7	4	44	22	+22	52	Qualification for UEFA Cup first qualifying round
3	Shakhtyor Soligorsk	26	16	3	7	50	31	+19	51	Qualification for Intertoto Cup first round
4	MTZ-RIPO Minsk	26	16	3	7	54	24	+30	51	
5	Gomel	26	12	6	8	33	32	+1	42	
6	Lokomotiv Vitebsk	26	9	11	6	21	18	+3	38	
7	Naftan Novopolotsk	26	11	4	11	45	42	+3	37	
8	Darida Minsk Raion	26	10	7	9	23	21	+2	37	
9	Dinamo Brest	26	8	7	11	17	31	−14	31	Qualification for UEFA Cup first qualifying round (Note: Dinamo Brest qualified for the UEFA Cup first qualifying round by winning the 2006–07 Belarusian Cup.)
10	Neman Grodno	26	8	6	12	24	30	−6	30	
11	Torpedo Zhodino	26	7	9	10	21	27	−6	30	
12	Dnepr Mogilev	26	6	5	15	29	47	−18	23	
13	Lokomotiv Minsk (R)	26	5	4	17	26	52	−26	19	Relegation to Belarusian First League
14	Belshina Bobruisk (R)	26	1	6	19	16	46	−30	9	Relegation to Belarusian First League

Source: rsssf.com
Rules for classification: 1st points; 2nd matches won; 3rd head-to-head
(C) Champions; (R) Relegated

== Results ==
Home \ Away	BAT	BSH	DAR	DBR	DMI	DNE	GOM	LMN	LVI	MTZ	NAF	NEM	SHA	TZH
BATE Borisov		1–0	1–0	3–0	2–2	3–0	1–1	4–2	2–2	1–3	2–1	2–0	2–1	1–0
Belshina Bobruisk	1–2		0–0	0–1	1–3	1–2	1–3	0–0	0–1	1–4	0–4	0–0	1–3	1–3
Darida Minsk Raion	3–1	1–0		1–2	0–0	3–2	1–0	0–1	0–0	0–1	2–1	2–1	0–2	0–0
Dinamo Brest	0–2	0–1	0–0		0–0	1–0	0–3	2–1	0–0	0–2	0–4	1–0	3–1	2–0
Dinamo Minsk	4–2	2–0	1–2	1–1		0–0	4–1	4–2	3–1	1–3	2–2	0–2	0–2	2–0
Dnepr Mogilev	0–3	3–3	1–2	0–1	0–2		0–2	2–1	0–2	5–3	2–1	0–1	0–2	0–0
Gomel	0–1	2–1	0–0	0–0	0–3	1–1		2–0	2–0	2–8	1–3	0–0	2–0	3–0
Lokomotiv Minsk	1–3	1–0	0–2	3–2	1–2	1–3	0–1		0–0	0–4	3–3	1–3	0–1	1–0
Lokomotiv Vitebsk	1–1	1–0	1–0	1–0	0–2	0–0	0–1	2–0		1–0	1–2	0–0	0–0	2–2
MTZ-RIPO Minsk	0–0	2–0	1–0	3–0	0–0	3–1	0–2	7–1	0–0		2–1	3–0	3–1	0–1
Naftan Novopolotsk	0–2	2–1	2–0	3–0	0–2	4–3	2–3	0–3	0–0	2–1		2–0	0–2	1–1
Neman Grodno	1–2	1–1	1–0	0–0	0–1	2–1	1–1	1–0	0–2	2–0	2–3		0–1	2–0
Shakhtyor Soligorsk	3–2	3–1	1–3	1–0	0–2	4–1	3–0	3–3	3–1	2–0	5–2	5–3		1–1
Torpedo Zhodino	1–1	1–1	1–1	1–1	0–1	1–2	2–0	1–0	0–2	0–1	2–0	2–1	1–0	

Source: football.by (in Belarusian)
Legend: Blue = home team win; Yellow = draw; Red = away team win.

== Belarusian clubs in European Cups ==
Round	Team #1	Agg.	Team #2	1st leg	2nd leg
2006 UEFA Intertoto Cup
First round	Shakhter Karagandy (Kazakhstan)	4–6	(Belarus) MTZ-RIPO Minsk	1–5	3–1
Second round	Moscow (Russia)	3–0	(Belarus) MTZ-RIPO Minsk	2–0	1–0
2006–07 UEFA Cup
First qualifying round	Zagłębie Lubin (Poland)	1–1 (a)	(Belarus) Dinamo Minsk	1–1	0–0
First qualifying round	BATE Borisov (Belarus)	3–0	(Moldova) Nistru Otaci	2–0	1–0
Second qualifying round	Artmedia Bratislava (Slovakia)	5–3	(Belarus) Dinamo Minsk	2–1	3–2
Second qualifying round	Rubin Kazan (Russia)	5–0	(Belarus) BATE Borisov	3–0	2–0
2006–07 UEFA Champions League
First qualifying round	Shakhtyor Soligorsk (Belarus)	0–2	(Bosnia and Herzegovina) Široki Brijeg	0–1	0–1

== Top scorers ==
Rank	Name	Team	Goals
1	(Belarus) Alyaksandr Klimenka	Shakhtyor Soligorsk	17
2	(Belarus) Raman Vasilyuk	Gomel	14
3	(Belarus) Vyacheslav Hleb	MTZ-RIPO Minsk	13
4	(Belarus) Artyom Kontsevoy	MTZ-RIPO Minsk	12
5	(Belarus) Gennadi Bliznyuk	BATE Borisov	11
6	(Brazil) Edu	Dinamo Minsk	10
7	(Belarus) Syarhey Kislyak	Dinamo Minsk	9
7	(Belarus) Oleg Strakhanovich	MTZ-RIPO Minsk	9
7	(Belarus) Valery Strypeykis	Gomel	9
10	(Belarus) Pavel Byahanski	Shakhtyor Soligorsk	8
10	(Belarus) Alyaksandr Hawrushka	Dnepr Mogilev	8

== See also ==
- 2006 Belarusian First League
- 2005–06 Belarusian Cup
- 2006–07 Belarusian Cup
