= 2006–07 Belarusian Cup =

Tournament details
- Country: Belarus
- Teams: 46

Final positions
- Champions: Dinamo Brest (1st title)
- Runners-up: BATE Borisov

Tournament statistics
- Matches played: 59
- Goals scored: 188 (3.19 per match)
- Top goal scorer(s): Dzmitry Mazalewski (9 goals)

The 2006–07 Belarusian Cup was the 16th edition of the football knock-out competition in Belarus.

Contrary to the league season, the competition has been conducted in a fall-spring rhythm. The first games were played on 2 July 2006 and the final on 27 May 2007. Dinamo Brest won the Cup.

== First round ==
15 teams from the Second League (out of 17, excluding two teams which were reserve squads for Premier and First League teams), 10 teams from the First League (out of 14) and 3 amateur clubs started in this round. The games were played on 2 and 5 July 2006.

4 First League clubs received a bye to the Round of 32: Zvezda-BGU Minsk (relegated from the Premier League after 2005 season), Mozyr-ZLiN (a merger of Slavia Mozyr who relegated from Premier League and ZLiN Gomel, who finished 4th in 2005 First League), Smorgon (3rd place in 2005 First League) and Minsk, a new club which took over the licence from Smena Minsk (5th in 2005 First League).

2 July 2006	Livadiya Dzerzhinsk (III)	1–4	Vertikal Kalinkovichi (III)	Dzerzhinsk
	Pastukhov 83'		Dulub 8', 42'; Belash 29'; Tikovets 90'

5 July 2006	Neman Mosty (III)	2–3	Lida (II)	Mosty
	Yakubchik 16'; Tarnolitskiy 54'		Prikhodko 50', 64'; Khodyko 58'

5 July 2006	Kobrin (III)	0–1	Baranovichi (II)	Kobrin
			Khlebosolov 45'

5 July 2006	Trudovye Rezervy Baran (A)	0–4	Dinamo-Belcard Grodno (III)	Baran
			Golubev 13'; Dolya 26', 61'; Rozumovich 53'

5 July 2006	Kommunalnik Zhlobin (III)	6–0	PMC Postavy (III)	Zhlobin
	Mikhalev 16'; Verkhov 37' (pen.); Demidchik 40', 54'; Prokopyuk 64'; Melnikaw 75'

5 July 2006	Osipovichi (III)	1–0	Bereza (II)	Osipovichi
	Sviridenko 33' (pen.)

5 July 2006	Savit Mogilev (III)	4–0	Kommunalnik Slonim (II)	Mogilev
	Shakaw 37', 90+1'; Ryzhankov 40'; Sikora 48'

5 July 2006	Spartak Shklov (III)	4–1	Molodechno (III)	Shklov
	Andreychikov 4', 35', 65'; Bubelev 40'		Fedorinchik 80'

5 July 2006	Gorki (III)	1–7	Mikashevichi (II)	Gorki
	Novoselov 46'		Shilovskiy 8'; Yanush 16' (pen.), 30'; Starkow 26'; Butramyev 50', 62'; Klimovich 79'

5 July 2006	Polesye Kozenki (III)	0–3	Polotsk (II)	Kozenki
			Aleshchanka 22'; Savinaw 31'; Pyatrow 73' (pen.)

5 July 2006	DUSSh Kirovsk (A)	2–6	Volna Pinsk (II)	Kirovsk
	Eremeyev 12'; Ivchenko 90+1' (pen.)		Naperkovsky 4'; Kurilchik 8', 36'; Repetsky 29'; Lutsevich 54' (pen.); Mikhalchenko 88'

5 July 2006	Snov (III)	1–2	Khimik Svetlogorsk (II)	Snov
	Narushevich 2'		Zabolotsky 53', 88'

5 July 2006	Orsha-BelAutoService (III)	1–2	Veras Nesvizh (II)	Orsha
	Akatsyev 43'		Botvinko 16'; Vasilevskiy 55'

5 July 2006	Khimik-Azot Grodno (A)	1–1 (a.e.t.) (2–3 p)	Vedrich-97 Rechitsa (II)	Grodno
	Kholetskiy 52'		Dimitrov 71'

== Round of 32 ==
14 winners of previous round were joined by 14 clubs from Premier League and four First League clubs who received a bye to this round. The games were played on 10 and 13 August 2006.

10 August 2006	Minsk (II)	3–2	Naftan Novopolotsk	Minsk
17:00 UTC+3	Makaraw 8', 35'; Litvinchuk 75'		Tsyhalka 11'; Belavusaw 89'	Stadium: Torpedo Stadium; Attendance: 500; Referee: Sergey Shmolik (Brest)

10 August 2006	Osipovichi (III)	0–3	Neman Grodno	Osipovichi
17:30 UTC+3			Makar 22', 72' (pen.); Kryvobok 38'	Stadium: Yunost Stadium; Attendance: 1,000; Referee: Igor Kruk (Molodechno)

10 August 2006	Khimik Svetlogorsk (II)	1–2	Dnepr Mogilev	Svetlogorsk
17:30 UTC+3	Gavrilovich 87'		Hawrushka 38'; Pawlaw 90+3'	Stadium: Bumazhnik Stadium; Attendance: 3,500; Referee: Valery Vyalichka (Minsk)

10 August 2006	Volna Pinsk (II)	1–1 (a.e.t.) (5–6 p)	Torpedo Zhodino	Pinsk
18:00 UTC+3	Repetsky 68'		Starenkyi 53'	Stadium: Pripyat Stadium; Attendance: 800; Referee: Mikhail Tsukanov (Gomel)
	Penalties
	Naperkovsky (penalty scored); Repetsky (penalty scored); Lutsevich (penalty scored); Berezko (penalty scored); Papichyts (penalty scored); Sharko (penalty missed); Balanovich (penalty missed); Yermolenko (penalty missed); Mikhalchenko (penalty missed); Vakulich (penalty missed)		(penalty scored) Narushevich; (penalty scored) Dzivakow; (penalty scored) Starenkyi; (penalty scored) Shitov; (penalty scored) Maroz; (penalty missed) Branfilaw; (penalty missed) Kiriyevich; (penalty missed) Grenkow; (penalty missed) Lazerko; (penalty scored) Gnedko

10 August 2006	Savit Mogilev (III)	0–6	MTZ-RIPO Minsk	Mogilev
18:00 UTC+3			Kontsevoy 18', 20'; Matsukevich 21' (o.g.); Strakhanovich 69'; Mamić 83'; Eramchuk 85'	Stadium: Torpedo Stadium; Attendance: 2,500; Referee: Vitaly Sevostyanik (Grodno)

10 August 2006	Smorgon (II)	0–0 (a.e.t.) (5–6 p)	Dinamo Brest	Smorgon
18:00 UTC+3				Stadium: Yunost Stadium; Attendance: 3,150; Referee: Gennadiy Yarets (Minsk)
	Penalties
	Mardas (penalty scored); Asipenka (penalty scored); Trindyuk (penalty scored); Davidovich (penalty scored); Yarosh (penalty scored); Kurak (penalty missed)		(penalty scored) Goginashvili; (penalty scored) Naumov; (penalty scored) Valadzko; (penalty scored) Parkhachev; (penalty scored) Dzemidovich; (penalty scored) Boyka

10 August 2006	Dinamo-Belcard Grodno (III)	1–2 (a.e.t.)	Darida Minsk Raion	Grodno
18:00 UTC+3	Golubev 62'		Shingirey 11'; Dzenisevich 107'	Stadium: Neman Stadium; Attendance: 2,300; Referee: Leonid Loznyukha (Minsk)

10 August 2006	Kommunalnik Zhlobin (III)	1–1 (a.e.t.) (4–5 p)	Shakhtyor Soligorsk	Zhlobin
18:00 UTC+3	Demidchik 22'		Byahanski 90'	Stadium: Lokomotiv Stadium; Attendance: 2,200; Referee: Antuan Mayorov (Minsk)
	Penalties
	Sergeev (penalty scored); Verkhov (penalty scored); Gurevich (penalty scored); Belyay (penalty scored); Kazlow (penalty missed)		(penalty scored) Hancharyk; (penalty scored) Klimenka; (penalty scored) Plaskonny; (penalty scored) Kavalchuk; (penalty scored) Magomedov

10 August 2006	Mikashevichi (II)	0–2	Gomel	Luninets
18:00 UTC+3			Strypeykis 43'; Karolik 69'	Stadium: Polesye Stadium; Attendance: 800; Referee: Dmitry Abushkevich (Mogilev)

13 August 2006	Polotsk (II)	3–1 (a.e.t.)	Mozyr-ZLiN (II)	Polotsk
16:00 UTC+3	Savinov 25'; Oleynikov 100'; Praslov 105'		Krechin 67'	Stadium: Spartak Stadium; Attendance: 300; Referee: Sergey Sakharevich (Grodno)

13 August 2006	Veras Nesvizh (II)	2–2 (a.e.t.) (4–5 p)	Lokomotiv Vitebsk	Nesvizh
16:00 UTC+3	Harkusha 62'; Yatskevich 79'		Irha 56' (pen.), 77'	Stadium: Urozhay Stadium; Attendance: 1,600; Referee: Valeriy Yazevich (Lida)
	Penalties
	Botvinko (penalty scored); Pyshnik (penalty scored); Stain (penalty scored); Olshevskiy (penalty missed); Shilo (penalty missed)		(penalty scored) Irha; (penalty scored) Buloychyk; (penalty scored) Usaw; (penalty missed) Ostrikov; (penalty scored) Skripchenko

13 August 2006	Spartak Shklov (III)	4–0	Zvezda-BGU Minsk (II)	Shklov
17:00 UTC+3	Andreychikov 17'; Syrokvashko 39', 69'; Filipaw 71'			Stadium: Spartak Stadium; Attendance: 800; Referee: Viktor Chernik (Mosty)

13 August 2006	Lida (II)	0–1	BATE Borisov	Lida
17:00 UTC+3			Zhavnerchik 17'	Stadium: City Stadium; Attendance: 1,500; Referee: Aleksandr Braichevskiy (Orsha)

13 August 2006	Baranovichi (II)	1–2 (a.e.t.)	Lokomotiv Minsk	Baranovichi
17:00 UTC+3	Chernykh 6'		Sedykh 7'; Markhel 106'	Stadium: Lokomotiv Stadium; Attendance: 3,500; Referee: Georgiy Verbitsky (Slonim)

13 August 2006	Vertikal Kalinkovichi (III)	0–4	Dinamo Minsk	Kalinkovichi
17:00 UTC+3			Kislyak 14'; Popov 44', 84'; Mbanangoyé 90+2'	Stadium: City Stadium; Attendance: 2,800; Referee: Yuriy Kuntsevich (Grodno)

13 August 2006	Vedrich-97 Rechitsa (II)	2–2 (a.e.t.) (3–0 p)	Belshina Bobruisk	Rechitsa
17:00 UTC+3	Dimitrov 13', 95'		Molozhavy 38'; Shubladze 117'	Stadium: Central Stadium; Attendance: 1,000; Referee: Dmitry Yevnevich (Minsk)
	Penalties
	Grishchenko (penalty scored); Dimitrov (penalty scored); Demenkovets (penalty scored)		(penalty missed) Zhukowski; (penalty missed) Danilyuk; (penalty missed) Fyodaraw

== Round of 16 ==
The games were played as two-legged ties. The first legs were played on 20 September 2006. The second legs were played on 4 October 2006.

Team 1	Agg.	Team 2	1st leg	2nd leg
Minsk (II)	5–2	Dnepr Mogilev	5–1	0–1
Spartak Shklov (III)	1–6	MTZ-RIPO Minsk	1–3	0–3
Dinamo Brest	7–2	Lokomotiv Minsk	4–1	3–1
Darida Minsk Raion	1–4	BATE Borisov	1–0	0–4
Vedrich-97 Rechitsa (II)	0–7	Dinamo Minsk	0–4	0–3
Polotsk (II)	1–2	Torpedo Zhodino	1–0	0–2
Lokomotiv Vitebsk	2–5	Shakhtyor Soligorsk	1–1	1–4
Gomel	1–5	Neman Grodno	0–2	1–3

=== First leg ===
20 September 2006	Minsk (II)	5–1	Dnepr Mogilev	Minsk
16:00 UTC+3	Pyatrawskas 6'; Litvinchuk 53'; Lyasyuk 73', 85'; Mikhnavets 78'		Pawlaw 80'	Stadium: Torpedo Stadium; Attendance: 500; Referee: Vitaly Sevostyanik (Grodno)

20 September 2006	Spartak Shklov (III)	1–3	MTZ-RIPO Minsk	Shklov
16:00 UTC+3	Baltrushevich 3'		Stashchanyuk 8'; Kontsevoy 26', 88'	Stadium: Spartak Stadium; Attendance: 1,500; Referee: Sergey Sakharevich (Grodno)

20 September 2006	Dinamo Brest	4–1	Lokomotiv Minsk	Brest
16:30 UTC+3	Naumov 26'; Tsevan 45'; Mazalewski 63', 72'		Abd Al-Majid 89'	Stadium: GOSK Brestskiy; Attendance: 1,000; Referee: Valeriy Yazevich (Lida)

20 September 2006	Darida Minsk Raion	1–0	BATE Borisov	Minsk
17:00 UTC+3	Muradyan 60'			Stadium: Darida Stadium; Attendance: 700; Referee: Valery Vyalichka (Minsk)

20 September 2006	Vedrich-97 Rechitsa (II)	0–4	Dinamo Minsk	Rechitsa
17:00 UTC+3			Kovel 7'; Marcio 80'; Mbanangoyé 83'; Edu 90+2'	Stadium: Central Stadium; Attendance: 1,500; Referee: Dmitry Abushkevich (Mogilev)

20 September 2006	Polotsk (II)	1–0	Torpedo Zhodino	Polotsk
17:00 UTC+3	Aleshchanka 80'			Stadium: Spartak Stadium; Attendance: 500; Referee: Sergey Shmolik (Brest)

20 September 2006	Lokomotiv Vitebsk	1–1	Shakhtyor Soligorsk	Vitebsk
18:00 UTC+3	Sitko 10'		Lyavonchyk 80'	Stadium: Vitebsky CSK; Attendance: 2,200; Referee: Gennadiy Yarets (Minsk)

20 September 2006	Gomel	0–2	Neman Grodno	Gomel
18:00 UTC+3			Kryvobok 14'; Kavalyuk 36'	Stadium: Central Stadium; Attendance: 3,200; Referee: Dmitry Yevnevich (Minsk)

=== Second leg ===
4 October 2006	Dinamo Minsk	3–0 (7–0 agg.)	Vedrich-97 Rechitsa (II)	Nesvizh
15:00 UTC+3	Hihevich 19'; Kislyak 49' (pen.); Hromțov 51'			Stadium: Urozhay Stadium; Attendance: 1,500; Referee: Georgiy Verbitsky (Slonim)

4 October 2006	MTZ-RIPO Minsk	3–0 (6–1 agg.)	Spartak Shklov (III)	Minsk
15:00 UTC+3	Valkanov 20'; Mamić 25'; Eramchuk 32'			Stadium: Traktor Stadium; Attendance: 800; Referee: Yuriy Kuntsevich (Grodno)

4 October 2006	Lokomotiv Minsk	1–3 (2–7 agg.)	Dinamo Brest	Molodechno
15:00 UTC+3	Krot 62'		Chernov 10'; Mazalewski 56'; Panasyuk 90+2'	Stadium: City Stadium; Attendance: 100; Referee: Aleksandr Braichevskiy (Orsha)

4 October 2006	Shakhtyor Soligorsk	4–1 (5–2 agg.)	Lokomotiv Vitebsk	Soligorsk
15:30 UTC+3	Klimenka 34'; Kavalchuk 61'; Byahanski 66'; Novik 87'		Usaw 68'	Stadium: Stroitel Stadium; Attendance: 2,000; Referee: Sergey Shmolik (Brest)

4 October 2006	Dnepr Mogilev	1–0 (2–5 agg.)	Minsk (II)	Mogilev
16:00 UTC+3	Hawrushka 4'			Stadium: Spartak Stadium; Attendance: 500; Referee: Valeriy Yazevich (Lida)

4 October 2006	Torpedo Zhodino	2–0 (2–1 agg.)	Polotsk (II)	Zhodino
16:00 UTC+3	Zuew 7'; Dzivakow 50' (pen.)			Stadium: Torpedo Stadium; Attendance: 750; Referee: Dmitry Yevnevich (Minsk)

4 October 2006	Neman Grodno	3–1 (5–1 agg.)	Gomel	Grodno
16:00 UTC+3	Kryvobok 42', 67'; Kavalyuk 80'		Karolik 17'	Stadium: Neman Stadium; Attendance: 1,000; Referee: Valery Vyalichka (Minsk)

4 October 2006	BATE Borisov	4–0 (4–1 agg.)	Darida Minsk Raion	Borisov
19:00 UTC+3	Stasevich 39'; Rodionov 67'; A.Lebedzew 81', 86'			Stadium: City Stadium; Attendance: 2,100; Referee: Yuriy Maistrov (Fanipol)

== Quarterfinals ==
The first legs were played on April 1, 2007. The second legs were played on April 5, 2007.

Team 1	Agg.	Team 2	1st leg	2nd leg
MTZ-RIPO Minsk	1–3	BATE Borisov	1–2	0–1
Minsk	2–1	Torpedo Zhodino	1–1	1–0
Shakhtyor Soligorsk	1–6	Dinamo Brest	0–2	1–4
Neman Grodno	4–2	Dinamo Minsk	1–2	3–0

=== First leg ===
1 April 2007	MTZ-RIPO Minsk	1–2	BATE Borisov	Minsk
15:00 UTC+3	Asipovich 39'		Rodionov 20', 59'	Stadium: Traktor Stadium; Attendance: 6,000; Referee: Sergey Shmolik (Brest)

1 April 2007	Minsk	1–1	Torpedo Zhodino	Minsk
15:30 UTC+3	Asipenka 19'		Zuew 11'	Stadium: KFP Minsk; Attendance: 1,200; Referee: Georgiy Verbitsky (Slonim)

1 April 2007	Shakhtyor Soligorsk	0–2	Dinamo Brest	Soligorsk
16:30 UTC+3			Mazalewski 5'; Sokol 75'	Stadium: Stroitel Stadium; Attendance: 2,900; Referee: Aleksandr Chebykin (Minsk)

1 April 2007	Neman Grodno	1–2	Dinamo Minsk	Grodno
17:00 UTC+3	Kirenya 73'		Yanushkevich 48'; Mbanangoyé 90+2'	Stadium: Neman Stadium; Attendance: 6,500; Referee: Igor Kruk (Molodechno)

=== Second leg ===
5 April 2007	Torpedo Zhodino	0–1 (a.e.t.) (1–2 agg.)	Minsk	Zhodino
17:00 UTC+3			Asipenka 90'	Stadium: Torpedo Stadium; Attendance: 2,300; Referee: Yuriy Kuntsevich (Grodno)

5 April 2007	Dinamo Minsk	0–3 (a.e.t.) (2–4 agg.)	Neman Grodno	Minsk
17:00 UTC+3			Rawneyka 20'; Kryvobok 31'; Alumona 40'	Stadium: Dinamo Stadium; Attendance: 2,200; Referee: Yuriy Maistrov (Fanipol)

5 April 2007	BATE Borisov	1–0 (a.e.t.) (3–1 agg.)	MTZ-RIPO Minsk	Borisov
18:00 UTC+3	Bliznyuk 70' (pen.)			Stadium: City Stadium; Attendance: 3,300; Referee: Aleksei Kulbakov (Gomel)

5 April 2007	Dinamo Brest	4–1 (a.e.t.) (6–3 agg.)	Shakhtyor Soligorsk	Brest
18:00 UTC+3	Mazalewski 49', 90'; Kozak 67'; Goginashvili 68'		Bychanok 64'	Stadium: GOSK Brestskiy; Attendance: 4,000; Referee: Andrey Zhukov (Minsk)

== Semifinals ==
The first legs were played on April 10, 2007. The second legs were played on May 2, 2007.

Team 1	Agg.	Team 2	1st leg	2nd leg
Minsk	0–2	BATE Borisov	0–1	0–1
Dinamo Brest	4–3	Neman Grodno	2–2	2–1

=== First leg ===
10 April 2007	Minsk	0–1	BATE Borisov	Minsk
17:00 UTC+3			Rodionov 84'	Stadium: Torpedo Stadium; Attendance: 1,500; Referee: Antuan Mayorov (Minsk)

10 April 2007	Dinamo Brest	2–2	Neman Grodno	Brest
18:00 UTC+3	Goginashvili 13'; Mazalewski 49'		Sosnovski 19'; Alumona 83'	Stadium: Regional Sport Complex Brestskiy; Attendance: 4,000; Referee: Valery Vyalichka (Minsk)

=== Second leg ===
2 May 2007	Neman Grodno	1–2 (3–4 agg.)	Dinamo Brest	Grodno
15:30 UTC+3	Alumona 65' (pen.)		Mazalewski 87', 90+2'	Stadium: Neman Stadium; Attendance: 7,000; Referee: Yuriy Maistrov (Fanipol)

2 May 2007	BATE Borisov	1–0 (2–0 agg.)	Minsk	Borisov
18:00 UTC+3	Rodionov 46'			Stadium: City Stadium; Attendance: 3,000; Referee: Antuan Mayorov (Minsk)

== Final ==
27 May 2007
18:00 UTC+3

Dinamo Brest	0–0 (a.e.t.)	BATE Borisov
	Report
Penalties
Mazalewski (penalty scored); Tsevan (penalty scored); Valadzko (penalty scored); Goginashvili (penalty missed); Sokal (penalty scored)	4–3	(penalty scored) Bliznyuk; (penalty scored) Rodionov; (penalty scored) Krivets; (penalty missed) Stasevich; (penalty missed) Fyedarovich

Dinamo Stadium, Minsk
Attendance: 9,500
Referee: Aleksandr Chebykin (Minsk)

DINAMO:
GK	1	(Belarus) Yury Tsyhalka
DF	15	(Belarus) Uladzimir Shcherba
DF	2	(Russia) Aleksey Shchigolev
DF	7	(Belarus) Vital Panasyuk
DF	3	(Ukraine) Roman Kots	(yellow card) 48'
MF	9	(Belarus) Alyaksandr Valadzko
MF	8	(Belarus) Syarhey Kozak		(substituted off) 79'
MF	6	(Belarus) Vadzim Dzemidovich		(substituted off) 64'
MF	13	(Belarus) Viktor Sokol (c)
MF	11	(Belarus) Andrey Chisty		(substituted off) 61'
FW	18	(Belarus) Dzmitry Mazalewski
Substitutes:
GK	16	(Russia) Dmitri Ekimov
MF	4	(Belarus) Andrey Tsevan		(substituted on) 64'
FW	10	(Georgia (country)) Roman Goginashvili		(substituted on) 79'
DF	12	(Belarus) Pavel Dovgulevets
MF	14	(Belarus) Roman Hovavko
MF	21	(Ukraine) Roman Zherzh		(substituted on) 61'
MF	22	(Belarus) Alyaksandr Dzyameshka
Manager:
(Belarus) Vladimir Gevorkyan

BATE:
GK	1	(Belarus) Alyaksandr Fyedarovich
DF	5	(Russia) Anri Khagush		(substituted off) 84'
DF	4	(Belarus) Artem Radkov	(yellow card) 56'
DF	24	(Russia) Vitali Kazantsev
DF	3	(Belarus) Yury Astravukh
MF	5	(Belarus) Pavel Platonaw		(substituted off) 37'
MF	2	(Belarus) Dzmitry Likhtarovich	(yellow card) 70'
MF	7	(Belarus) Alyaksandr Yermakovich (c)		(substituted off) 67'
MF	22	(Belarus) Ihar Stasevich
FW	20	(Belarus) Vitali Rodionov
FW	9	(Belarus) Gennadi Bliznyuk
Substitutes:
GK	35	(Belarus) Barys Pankrataw
MF	6	(Belarus) Valentin Radevich
MF	10	(Belarus) Sergey Krivets		(substituted on) 37'
MF	13	(Belarus) Pavel Nyakhaychyk
DF	15	(Belarus) Maksim Zhavnerchik		(substituted on) 67'
MF	17	(Belarus) Mikhail Sivakow
DF	21	(Belarus) Egor Filipenko		(substituted on) 84'
Manager:
(Belarus) Igor Kriushenko
