= 2012 FC BATE Borisov season =

BATE Borisov
2012 season
- Manager: Viktor Goncharenko
- Stadium: Haradski Stadium
- Belarusian Premier League: 1st
- 2012–13 Belarusian Cup: Round of 16
- Belarusian Super Cup: Runners-up
- 2012–13 UEFA Champions League: Group Stage
- 2012–13 UEFA Europa League: Round of 32

The 2012 season was Football Club BATE Borisov's 15th consecutive season in the Belarusian Premier League. In addition to the domestic league, BATE Borisov participated in the Belarusian Cup, the Belarusian Super Cup and the UEFA Champions League.

== Squad ==
Note: Flags indicate national team as defined under FIFA eligibility rules; some limited exceptions apply. Players may hold more than one non-FIFA nationality.

No.	Pos.	Nation	Player
2	MF	BLR	Dzmitry Likhtarovich
5	DF	BLR	Alyaksandr Yurevich
6	MF	BLR	Aleh Patotski
7	FW	BLR	Artem Kontsevoy
8	MF	BLR	Alyaksandr Valadzko
9	FW	BRA	Maycon Calijuri
10	MF	BRA	Renan Bressan
11	MF	ARM	Zaven Badoyan
13	FW	BLR	Dzmitry Mazalewski
14	DF	BLR	Artsyom Radzkow
15	MF	BLR	Alexander Hleb
16	GK	BLR	Andrey Shcharbakow
17	MF	BLR	Alyaksandr Pawlaw
18	DF	BLR	Maksim Bordachyov
19	MF	BLR	Kirill Aleksiyan

No.	Pos.	Nation	Player
20	FW	BLR	Vitali Rodionov
21	DF	BLR	Yegor Filipenko
22	DF	SRB	Marko Simić
23	MF	BLR	Edgar Olekhnovich
24	DF	BLR	Yawhen Kuntsevich
25	MF	BLR	Dmitry Baga
27	MF	BLR	Vadim Kurlovich
28	MF	BLR	Syarhey Hlyabko
30	GK	BLR	Alyaksandr Hutar
32	MF	BLR	Mikhail Sivakow
33	DF	BLR	Denis Polyakov
35	GK	BLR	Andrey Harbunow
77	MF	BLR	Filipp Rudik
78	FW	BLR	Raman Vasilyuk
—	MF	BRA	Mauro Alonso

== Competitions ==
=== Overview ===
Competition	First match	Last match	Starting round	Final position	Record							
Competition	First match	Last match	Starting round	Final position	Pld	W	D	L	GF	GA	GD	Win %
Belarusian Premier League	24 March 2012	25 November 2012	Matchday 1	Winners	30	21	5	4	51	16	+35	70.00
2012–13 Belarusian Cup	9 September 2012	13 October 2012	Round of 32	Round of 16	2	1	0	1	4	1	+3	50.00
Belarusian Super Cup	6 March 2012		Final	Runners-up	1	0	0	1	0	2	−2	0.00
2012–13 UEFA Champions League	18 July 2012	5 December 2012	Second qualifying round	Group stage	12	5	3	4	18	19	−1	41.67
Total					45	27	8	10	73	38	+35	60.00

Source: Competitions

=== Belarusian Super Cup ===
6 March 2012 Final	BATE Borisov	0–2	Gomel	Minsk
19:00 EEST (UTC+3)	Polyakov (yellow card) 8'	Report	V. Hleb 26', 62'; Kashewski (yellow card) 35'	Stadium: Football Manege; Referee: Sergey Tsinkevich

=== Belarusian Premier League ===
==== League table ====
Pos	Team	Pld	W	D	L	GF	GA	GD	Pts	Qualification
1	BATE Borisov (C)	30	21	5	4	51	16	+35	68	Qualification for Champions League second qualifying round
2	Shakhtyor Soligorsk	30	18	7	5	59	24	+35	61	Qualification for Europa League second qualifying round
3	Dinamo Minsk	30	16	8	6	37	19	+18	56	Qualification for Europa League first qualifying round
4	Gomel	30	14	8	8	39	24	+15	50	
5	Neman Grodno	30	10	11	9	43	36	+7	41	

Source: football.by
Rules for classification: 1st points; 2nd matches won; 3rd head-to-head (points, matches won, goal difference, goals scored); 4th goal difference; 5th goals scored
(C) Champions

==== Results summary ====
Overall								Home						Away					
Pld	W	D	L	GF	GA	GD	Pts	W	D	L	GF	GA	GD	W	D	L	GF	GA	GD
30	21	5	4	51	16	+35	68	11	2	2	31	10	+21	10	3	2	20	6	+14

Source: Competitions

==== Matches ====
24 March 2012 1	Minsk	1–0	BATE Borisov	Minsk
15:00 EET (UTC+2)	Razin 76'	Report		Stadium: Dinamo Stadium; Referee: Aleksei Kulbakov

31 March 2012 2	BATE Borisov	3–1	Belshina Bobruisk	Borisov
17:00 EEST (UTC+3)	Mazalewski 13', 90'; Bressan 69'	Report	Maltsaw 57'	Stadium: Haradski Stadium; Referee: Valery Vyalichka

6 April 2012 3	Brest	0–2	BATE Borisov	Brest
18:00 EEST (UTC+3)		Report	Kontsevoy 1'; Rodionov 89'	Stadium: OSK Brestskiy; Referee: Oleg Cherepnev

14 April 2012 4	BATE Borisov	2–0	Neman Grodno	Borisov
18:00 EEST (UTC+3)	Mazalewski 7', 27'	Report		Stadium: Haradski Stadium; Referee: Mikhail Lavskiy

21 April 2012 5	Dinamo Minsk	0–2	BATE Borisov	Minsk
17:00 EEST (UTC+3)	Plaskonny (yellow card) 45' (yellow-red card) 74'; Drahun (yellow card) 59'; Stasevich (yellow card) 79'; Danilov (yellow card) 87'	Report	Kontsevoy (yellow card) 2'; Baga 45', 85', (yellow card) 65'	Stadium: Dinamo Stadium; Referee: Igor Kruk

28 April 2012 6	BATE Borisov	1–0	Shakhtyor Soligorsk	Borisov
19:00 EEST (UTC+3)	Mazalewski 35'	Report		Stadium: Haradski Stadium; Referee: Valery Vyalichka

3 May 2012 7	Torpedo-BelAZ Zhodino	0–2	BATE Borisov	Zhodino
17:30 EEST (UTC+3)		Report	Bressan 4'; Mazalewski 34'	Stadium: Torpedo Stadium; Referee: Aleksei Kulbakov

7 May 2012 8	BATE Borisov	3–0	Naftan Novopolotsk	Borisov
19:00 EEST (UTC+3)	Mazalewski 21'; Baga 31'; Kontsevoy 40'	Report		Stadium: Haradski Stadium; Referee: Oleg Cherepnev

12 May 2012 9	Gomel	0–1	BATE Borisov	Gomel
17:00 EEST (UTC+3)		Report	Baga 38'	Stadium: Central Stadium; Referee: Sergey Tsinkevich

18 May 2012 10	BATE Borisov	2–1	Slavia Mozyr	Borisov
19:00 EEST (UTC+3)	Rodionov 31'; Bressan 35'	Report	Strakhanovich 47'	Stadium: Haradski Stadium; Referee: Vadim Panchenko

24 May 2012 11	BATE Borisov	2–0	Minsk	Borisov
19:00 EEST (UTC+3)	Rodionov 10', 20'	Report		Stadium: Haradski Stadium; Referee: Mikhail Lavskiy

11 June 2012 12	Belshina Bobruisk	0–1	BATE Borisov	Bobruisk
18:00 EEST (UTC+3)		Report	Rudik 26'	Stadium: Spartak Stadium; Referee: Denis Scherbakov

15 June 2012 13	BATE Borisov	0–1	Brest	Borisov
19:00 EEST (UTC+3)		Report	Zabara 90+2'	Stadium: Haradski Stadium; Referee: Valery Vyalichka

27 June 2012 14	Neman Grodno	1–2	BATE Borisov	Grodno
19:00 EEST (UTC+3)	Lyasyuk 90+2'	Report	Kontsevoy 67'; Baga 83'	Stadium: Neman Stadium; Referee: Sergey Tsinkevich

1 July 2012 15	BATE Borisov	1–3	Dinamo Minsk	Borisov
18:00 EEST (UTC+3)	Bressan 44'; Simić (yellow card) 81'	Report	Afanasyev 32'; Danilov (yellow card) 44'; Zita (yellow card) 58'; Polyakov 66' (o.g.); Figueredo 74'; Kibuk (yellow card) 80'; Sulima (yellow card) 83'	Stadium: Haradski Stadium; Referee: Vitaly Sevostyanik

7 July 2012 16	Shakhtyor Soligorsk	1–1	BATE Borisov	Soligorsk
17:00 EEST (UTC+3)	Asipenka 19'	Report	Olekhnovich 74'	Stadium: Stroitel Stadium; Referee: Igor Kruk

13 July 2012 17	BATE Borisov	0–0	Torpedo-BelAZ Zhodino	Borisov
19:00 EEST (UTC+3)		Report		Stadium: Haradski Stadium; Referee: Vadim Panchenko

12 August 2012 18	Naftan Novopolotsk	0–4	BATE Borisov	Novopolotsk
17:30 EEST (UTC+3)		Report	Simić 4'; Bressan 71'; Pawlaw 74'; Vasilyuk 90+1'	Stadium: Atlant Stadium; Referee: Mikhail Lavskiy

17 August 2012 19	BATE Borisov	0–0	Gomel	Borisov
19:00 EEST (UTC+3)		Report		Stadium: Haradski Stadium; Referee: Valery Vyalichka

2 September 2012 21	Gomel	1–2	BATE Borisov	Gomel
19:00 EEST (UTC+3)	Aleksiyevich 26'	Report	Vasilyuk 37'; Bressan 51'	Stadium: Central Stadium; Referee: Vadim Panchenko

15 September 2012 22	BATE Borisov	2–0	Torpedo-BelAZ Zhodino	Borisov
15:00 EEST (UTC+3)	Pawlaw 66'; Simić 76'	Report		Stadium: Haradski Stadium; Referee: Oleg Cherepnev

23 September 2012 23	Dinamo Minsk	0–0	BATE Borisov	Minsk
15:00 EEST (UTC+3)	Danilov (yellow card) 49'; Simović (yellow card) 88'	Report	Olekhnovich (yellow card) 25'; Sivakow (yellow card) 63'	Stadium: Dinamo Stadium; Referee: Vadim Panchenko

28 September 2012 24	BATE Borisov	5–1	Neman Grodno	Borisov
18:00 EEST (UTC+3)	Bressan 26' (pen.), 61'; Pawlaw 45'; Rodionov 51', 64'	Report	Dzenisevich 39'	Stadium: Haradski Stadium; Referee: Denis Scherbakov

7 October 2012 25	Belshina Bobruisk	0–1	BATE Borisov	Bobruisk
15:00 EEST (UTC+3)		Report	Rudik 39'	Stadium: Spartak Stadium; Referee: Aleksei Kulbakov

18 October 2012 20	Slavia Mozyr	1–2	BATE Borisov	Mazyr
15:00 EEST (UTC+3)	Irha 71'	Report	Kuntsevich 20'; Mazalewski 43'	Stadium: Yunost Stadium; Referee: Sergey Tsinkevich

28 October 2012 26	BATE Borisov	3–1	Brest	Borisov
16:00 EET (UTC+2)	Olekhnovich 10'; Mazalewski 50'; Bressan 90+2'	Report	Khvashchynski 76'	Stadium: Haradski Stadium; Referee: Valery Vyalichka

3 November 2012 27	Naftan Novopolotsk	1–0	BATE Borisov	Novopolotsk
13:30 EET (UTC+2)	Zyulew 42'	Report		Stadium: Atlant Stadium; Referee: Aleksei Kulbakov

11 November 2012 28	BATE Borisov	5–1	Minsk	Borisov
15:00 EET (UTC+2)	Bressan 23', 54' (pen.); Rakhmanaw 64' (o.g.); Rodionov 71', 82'	Report	Wojciechowski 29'	Stadium: Haradski Stadium; Referee: Vitaly Sevostyanik

17 November 2012 29	Slavia Mozyr	0–0	BATE Borisov	Mazyr
13:00 EET (UTC+2)		Report		Stadium: Yunost Stadium; Referee: Aleksandr Evnevich

25 November 2012 30	BATE Borisov	2–1	Shakhtyor Soligorsk	Borisov
12:00 EET (UTC+2)	Olekhnovich 35'; Kontsevoy 51'	Report	Kamarowski 53'	Stadium: Haradski Stadium; Referee: Vadim Panchenko

=== Belarusian Cup ===
9 September 2012 Round of 32	Rudensk	0–4	BATE Borisov	Maryina Horka
16:00 EEST (UTC+3)		Report	Olekhnovich 2'; Kontsevoy 34' (pen.), 40'; Vasilyuk 62'	Stadium: Haradski Stadium; Referee: Andrey Soroka

13 October 2012 Round of 16	BATE Borisov	0–1	Torpedo-BelAZ Zhodino	Borisov
17:00 EEST (UTC+3)		Report	Yatskevich 56'	Stadium: Haradski Stadium; Referee: Oleg Cherepnev

=== UEFA Champions League ===
==== Qualifying rounds ====
===== Second qualifying round =====
18 July 2012 First leg	BATE Borisov (Belarus)	3–2	(North Macedonia) Vardar	Borisov, Belarus
19:00 EEST (UTC+3)	Rodionov 41'; Kontsevoy (yellow card) 72'; Simić (yellow card) 75'; Rodionov 90+2', 90+4'	Report	Vajs (yellow card) 16'; Kostovski 54'; Stjepanović 62', (yellow card) 75'; Petrov (yellow card) 77'	Stadium: Haradski Stadium; Attendance: 5,180; Referee: Olivier Thual (France)

25 July 2012 Second leg	Vardar (North Macedonia)	0–0 (2–3 agg.)	(Belarus) BATE Borisov	Skopje, Montenegro
20:00 CEST (UTC+2)	M. Ilievski (yellow card) 61'; Ranđelović (yellow card) 69'; Tanevski (yellow card) 75'; Manevski (yellow card) 81'	Report	Kontsevoy (yellow card) 48'	Stadium: Philip II Arena; Attendance: 28,500; Referee: Paolo Valeri (Italy)
Note: BATE Borisov won 3–2 on aggregate.

===== Third qualifying round =====
1 August 2012 First leg	BATE Borisov (Belarus)	1–1	(Hungary) Debrecen	Borisov, Belarus
19:00 EEST (UTC+3)	Pawlaw (yellow card) 62'; Sidibe 90+3' (o.g.)	Report	Ramos (yellow card) 33'; Sidibe 67'; Korhut (yellow card) 87'; Mbengono (yellow card) 90+3'; J. Varga (yellow card) 90+3'	Stadium: Haradski Stadium; Attendance: 5,170; Referee: Sascha Kever (Switzerland)

7 August 2012 Second leg	Debrecen (Hungary)	0–2 (1–3 agg.)	(Belarus) BATE Borisov	Nyíregyháza, Hungary (Note: The match was played at the Városi Stadion in Nyíregyháza, instead of Debrecen regular stadium, the Oláh Gábor utcai Stadion in Debrecen, which did not meet UEFA requirements.)
20:30 CEST (UTC+2)	Korhut (yellow card) 12'; Coulibaly (yellow card) 43'; Mészáros (yellow card) 45'; Nikolov (yellow card) 51' (yellow-red card) 57'	Report	Mazalewski 25'; A. Valadzko 59'; Simić (yellow card) 60'; Radzkow (yellow card) 82'	Stadium: Városi Stadion; Attendance: 10,000; Referee: Liran Liany (Israel)
Note: BATE Borisov won 3–1 on aggregate.

==== Play-off round ====
22 August 2012 First leg	BATE Borisov (Belarus)	2–0	(Israel) Ironi Kiryat Shmona	Minsk, Belarus (Note: The match was played at the Dinamo Stadium in Minsk, instead of BATE Borisov regular stadium, the Haradski Stadium in Borisov, which did not meet UEFA requirements.)
21:45 EEST (UTC+3)	Hleb (yellow card) 22'; Rodionov 29', 78'; Bressan (yellow card) 75'	Report	Matović (yellow card) 26' (yellow-red card) 70'; Gazal (yellow card) 30'; Rochet (yellow card) 45+1'; Gabai (yellow card) 90+4'	Stadium: Dinamo Stadium; Attendance: 16,352; Referee: Howard Webb (England)

28 August 2012 Second leg	Ironi Kiryat Shmona (Israel)	1–1 (1–3 agg.)	(Belarus) BATE Borisov	Ramat Gan, Israel (Note: The match was played at the Ramat Gan Stadium in Tel Aviv District, instead of Ironi Kiryat Shmona regular stadium, the Municipal Stadium in Kiryat Shmona, which did not meet UEFA requirements.)
21:45 IDT (UTC+3)	Tzedek (yellow card) 12'; Tasevski (yellow card) 49'; Hasarma (yellow card) 55'; Lencse 67'; Elisha (yellow card) 69'; Abed (yellow card) 72'; Badash (yellow card) 90+2'	Report	Simić (yellow card) 75'; Polyakov (yellow card) 80'; Pawlaw 90+4'	Stadium: Ramat Gan Stadium; Attendance: 3,106; Referee: Viktor Kassai (Hungary)
Note: BATE Borisov won 3–1 on aggregate.

==== Group stage ====
Pos	Team	Pld	W	D	L	GF	GA	GD	Pts	Qualification	BAY	VAL	BATE	LIL
1	(Germany) Bayern Munich	6	4	1	1	15	7	+8	13 (Note: Head-to-head points: Bayern Munich 4, Valencia 1.)	Advance to knockout phase	—	2–1	4–1	6–1
2	(Spain) Valencia	6	4	1	1	12	5	+7	13	Advance to knockout phase	1–1	—	4–2	2–0
3	(Belarus) BATE Borisov	6	2	0	4	9	15	−6	6	Transfer to Europa League	3–1	0–3	—	0–2
4	(France) Lille	6	1	0	5	4	13	−9	3		0–1	0–1	1–3	—

Source: Soccerway
Notes:

19 September 2012 1	Lille (France)	1–3	(Belarus) BATE Borisov	Villeneuve d'Ascq, France
20:45 CEST (UTC+2)	Payet (yellow card) 11'; Digne (yellow card) 53'; Roux (yellow card) 54'; Chedjou (yellow card) 60'; Mavuba (yellow card) 90'	Report	A. Valadzko 6'; Rodionov 20', (yellow card) 38'; Olekhnovich (yellow card) 28', (goal) 43'; Pawlaw (yellow card) 54'; Polyakov (yellow card) 70'	Stadium: Grand Stade Lille Métropole; Attendance: 38,122; Referee: Marcin Borski (Poland)

2 October 2012 2	BATE Borisov (Belarus)	3–1	(Germany) Bayern Munich	Minsk, Belarus
21:45 EEST (UTC+3)	Pawlaw (yellow card) 22', (goal) 23'; Bordachyov (yellow card) 70'; Rodionov 78'; Harbunow (yellow card) 90'; Bressan 90+4'	Report	Badstuber (yellow card) 50'; Dante (yellow card) 58'; Luiz Gustavo (yellow card) 72'; Ribéry 90+1'; Pizarro (yellow card) 90+2'	Stadium: Dinamo Stadium; Attendance: 24,636; Referee: Aleksandar Stavrev (Macedonia)

23 October 2012 3	BATE Borisov (Belarus)	0–3	(Spain) Valencia	Minsk, Belarus
21:45 EEST (UTC+3)	Simić (yellow card) 45+1'; Pawlawa (yellow card) 59'	Report	Soldado (yellow card) 40', (goal) 45+1' (pen.), 55', 69'; Albelda (yellow card) 61'	Stadium: Dinamo Stadium; Attendance: 29,180; Referee: Craig Thomson (Scotland)

7 November 2012 4	Valencia (Spain)	4–2	(Belarus) BATE Borisov	Valencia, Spain
20:45 CET (UTC+1)	Jonas 26'; Soldado 29' (pen.); Gago (yellow card) 32'; Feghouli 51', 86'	Report	Bordachyov (yellow card) 25'; Bressan 53'; Rodionov (yellow card) 56'; Sivakow (yellow card) 58'; Radzkow (yellow card) 62'; Mazalewski 83'	Stadium: Mestalla; Attendance: 22,795; Referee: Tom Harald Hagen (Norway)

20 November 2012 5	BATE Borisov (Belarus)	0–2	(France) Lille	Minsk, Belarus
19:00 EET (UTC+2)	Bressan (yellow card) 45'; Radzkow (yellow card) 90+1'	Report	Sidibé 14', (yellow card) 48' (yellow-red card) 74'; Bruno 31', (yellow card) 31'; Pedretti (yellow card) 87'	Stadium: Dinamo Stadium; Attendance: 22,810; Referee: Marijo Strahonja (Croatia)

5 December 2012 6	Bayern Munich (Germany)	4–1	(Belarus) BATE Borisov	Munich, Germany
20:45 CET (UTC+1)	Gómez 22'; Boateng (red card) 51'; Rafinha (yellow card) 51'; Müller 54'; Shaqiri 65'; Alaba 83'	Report	Polyakov (yellow card) 34' (yellow-red card) 69'; Vasilyuk (yellow card) 74'; Filipenko 89'	Stadium: Allianz Arena; Attendance: 68,000; Referee: William Collum (Scotland)

Europa League Knockout phase took place during the 2013 season
