= Alyaksandr =

Alyaksandr is a given name. People associated with this name include:

- Alyaksandr Sazankow
- Alyaksandr Rayewski
- Alyaksandr Kulchy
- Alyaksandr Shahoyka
- Alyaksandr Katlyaraw
- Alyaksandr Matsyukhevich
- Alyaksandr Bychanok
- Alyaksandr Skshynetski
- Alyaksandr Vyazhevich
- Alyaksandr Kazulin
- Alyaksandr Talkanitsa
- Alyaksandr Pawlaw
- Alyaksandr Yurevich
- Alyaksandr Chayka
- Alyaksandr Davidovich
- Alyaksandr Khatskevich
- Alyaksandr Rybak
- Alyaksandr Lukashenka
- Alyaksandr Hleb
- Alyaksandr Dzyameshka
- Alyaksandr Vyazhevich
- Alyaksandr Kalatsey
- Alyaksandr Yadeshka
