= 2011 Belarusian Super Cup =

BATE Borisov	Torpedo-BelAZ Zhodino
3	0
- Date: 27 February 2011
- Venue: Football Manege, Minsk
- Referee: Sergey Sakharevich
- Attendance: 1,600

The 2011 Belarusian Super Cup was held on 27 February 2011 between the 2010 Belarusian Premier League champions and 2009–10 Belarusian Cup winners BATE Borisov and the 2009–10 Belarusian Cup runners-up Torpedo-BelAZ Zhodino. BATE won the match 3–0 and defended the trophy.

== Match details ==
27 February 2011
17:00 UTC+3

BATE Borisov	3 – 0	Torpedo-BelAZ Zhodino
Baha 30'; Bressan 86'; Nyakhaychyk 90+2'	Report

Football Manege, Minsk
Attendance: 1,600
Referee: Sergey Sakharevich (Grodno)

BATE:
GK	30	(Belarus) Alyaksandr Hutar	(yellow card) 81'
DF	24	(Belarus) Yawhen Kuntsevich
DF	14	(Belarus) Artsyom Radzkow
DF	21	(Belarus) Egor Filipenko
DF	5	(Belarus) Alyaksandr Yurevich (c)	(yellow card) 69'
MF	77	(Belarus) Filip Rudzik		(substituted off) 64'
MF	23	(Belarus) Edhar Alyakhnovich	(yellow card) 31'	(substituted off) 87'
MF	11	(Belarus) Mikhail Gordeichuk	(yellow card) 60'
MF	25	(Belarus) Dzmitry Baha		(substituted off) 90'
MF	17	(Belarus) Alyaksandr Pawlaw		(substituted off) 56'
FW	15	(Belarus) Maksim Skavysh		(substituted off) 77'
Substitutes:
GK	16	(Belarus) Andrey Shcharbakow
MF	2	(Belarus) Dzmitry Likhtarovich		(substituted on) 87'
DF	4	(Belarus) Igor Shitov		(substituted on) 90'
MF	8	(Belarus) Alyaksandr Valadzko		(substituted on) 64'
MF	10	(Brazil) Renan Bressan		(substituted on) 77'
MF	13	(Belarus) Pavel Nyakhaychyk		(substituted on) 56'
DF	18	(Belarus) Maksim Bardachow
Manager:
(Belarus) Viktor Goncharenko

TORPEDO-BELAZ:
GK	71	(Belarus) Anton Kavalewski
DF	17	(Belarus) Alyaksey Kazlow
DF	55	(Ukraine) Serhiy Lyubchak
DF	26	(Belarus) Anton Rabtsaw
DF	23	(Belarus) Andrey Dzivakow
MF	15	(Belarus) Artsyom Salavey
MF	20	(Belarus) Sergey Tikhonovsky		(substituted off) 83'
MF	33	(Moldova) Maksim Chebotar
MF	3	(Belarus) Vitali Lanko		(substituted off) 76'
MF	14	(Belarus) Ihar Truhaw (c)	(yellow card) 50'
FW	50	(Belarus) Syarhey Irha	(yellow card) 18'	(substituted off) 62'
Substitutes:
GK	16	(Belarus) Dzyanis Parechyn
MF	7	(Belarus) Uladzimir Maroz
MF	8	(Ukraine) Oleksandr Papush		(substituted on) 76'
MF	10	(Russia) Nikita Drozdov		(substituted on) 83'
DF	13	(Belarus) Yury Ryzhko
FW	21	(Belarus) Arseniy Tyutyunik
FW	77	(Ukraine) Ihor Kryvobok		(substituted on) 62'
Manager:
(Belarus) Sergei Gurenko

== See also ==
- 2010 Belarusian Premier League
- 2009–10 Belarusian Cup
