= Vital Panasyuk =

Belarusian footballer

Personal information
- Date of birth: 9 February 1980 (age 46)
- Place of birth: Brest, Belarusian SSR
- Height: 1.85 m (6 ft 1 in)
- Position: Defender

Youth career
- 1996–1999: RUOR Minsk

Senior career*
Years	Team	Apps	(Gls)
1996–1999	RUOR Minsk	71	(0)
2000–2001	BATE Borisov	34	(0)
2002	Dinamo Brest	20	(1)
2003	Belshina Bobruisk	23	(1)
2004	Dinamo Brest	17	(0)
2005	Granit Mikashevichi	28	(1)
2006–2008	Dinamo Brest	50	(1)
2009–2010	Vitebsk	33	(2)
2011	Granit Mikashevichi	18	(1)
2012	Smorgon	14	(0)
2012	Navbahor Namangan	12	(0)
2014–2015	Kobrin	44	(1)

International career
2000–2001	Belarus U21	9	(0)
- * Club domestic league appearances and goals as of 1 December 2015

Vital Panasyuk (Belarusian: Віталь Панасюк; Russian: Виталий Панасюк; born 9 February 1980) is a Belarusian former professional footballer.

== Honours ==
Dinamo Brest

- Belarusian Cup winner: 2006–07
