= Andrey Chisty =

Belarusian former footballer

Personal information
- Date of birth: 30 March 1983 (age 43)
- Place of birth: Ivatsevichy, Brest Oblast, Belarusian SSR
- Height: 1.76 m (5 ft 9 1/2 in)
- Position: Midfielder

Youth career
- 2000–2002: Dinamo Brest

Senior career*
Years	Team	Apps	(Gls)
2000–2004	Dinamo Brest	21	(0)
2005	Granit Mikashevichi	23	(12)
2006–2009	Dinamo Brest	64	(5)
2010–2011	Granit Mikashevichi	36	(4)
2014–2015	Kobrin	38	(6)
2021	Brestzhilstroy	4	(0)
- * Club domestic league appearances and goals as of 31 December 2021

Andrey Chisti (Russian: Андрей Чистый; born 30 March 1983) is a Belarusian former footballer.

== Career ==
A graduate of the Ivatsevichy Sports School, Chisty played football for FC Dinamo Brest and FC Granit Mikashevichi in the Belarusian Premier League.

== Honours ==
Dinamo Brest

- Belarusian Cup winner: 2006–07
