= Buloychyk =

Buloychyk (Belarusian: Булойчык) is a surname. Notable people with the surname include:

- Alyaksandr Buloychyk (born 1979), Belarusian retired footballer
- Artsyom Buloychyk (born 1992), Belarusian football coach and former player
