= Viktor Sokol (footballer, born 1981) =

Belarusian footballer

Personal information
- Full name: Viktor Viktorovich Sokol
- Date of birth: 9 May 1981 (age 45)
- Place of birth: Minsk, Belarusian SSR
- Height: 1.78 m (5 ft 10 in)
- Position: Midfielder

Youth career
- 1998–1999: RUOR Minsk

Senior career*
Years	Team	Apps	(Gls)
1998–1999	RUOR Minsk	35	(2)
2000	Dinamo-Juni Minsk	21	(2)
2001–2004	Dinamo Minsk	68	(7)
2005–2007	Dinamo Brest	70	(19)
2008	Enköping	20	(3)
2009	Vitebsk	12	(2)
2009–2010	Dinamo Brest	39	(6)
2011	Shakhtyor Soligorsk	29	(4)
2012	Brest	23	(2)
2014	Kobrin	3	(0)
2014	Isloch Minsk Raion	6	(0)

International career
2001–2004	Belarus U21	15	(1)
- * Club domestic league appearances and goals as of 1 December 2014

Viktor Sokol (Belarusian: Віктар Сокал; Russian: Виктор Сокол; born 9 May 1981) is a retired Belarusian footballer. His father, who is also named Viktor Sokol was also a professional footballer from late 70s to early 90s.

== Honours ==
Dinamo Minsk

- Belarusian Premier League champion: 2004
- Belarusian Cup winner: 2002–03

Dinamo Brest

- Belarusian Cup winner: 2006–07
