= Syarhey Kozak =

Belarusian footballer

Personal information
- Date of birth: 17 October 1981 (age 45)
- Place of birth: Brest, Belarus
- Height: 1.81 m (5 ft 11 1/2 in)
- Position: Midfielder

Youth career
- SDYuShOR-5 Brest

Senior career*
Years	Team	Apps	(Gls)
1999	Rotor Volgograd	0	(0)
1999	→ Rotor-2 Volgograd	20	(0)
2000–2002	Dnepr-Transmash Mogilev	54	(9)
2003–2004	Torpedo-SKA Minsk	53	(15)
2005–2006	Gomel	47	(4)
2007–2010	Dinamo Brest	80	(6)
2011	Belshina Bobruisk	20	(1)
2014–2015	Kobrin	43	(4)
2018	Rukh Brest	2	(0)
2021	Brestzhilstroy	4	(1)

International career
2001–2003	Belarus U21	9	(1)

Managerial career
- 2015: Kobrin
- * Club domestic league appearances and goals as of 31 December 2021

Syarhey Kozak (Belarusian: Сяргей Козак; Russian: Серге́й Козак; born 17 October 1981) is a Belarusian football coach and former player.

== Honours ==
Dinamo Brest

- Belarusian Cup winner: 2006–07
