= Roman Hovavko =

Belarusian footballer

Personal information
- Date of birth: 2 March 1988 (age 38)
- Place of birth: Brest, Belarusian SSR
- Height: 1.77 m (5 ft 10 in)
- Position: Midfielder

Youth career
- 2005–2007: Dinamo Brest

Senior career*
Years	Team	Apps	(Gls)
2007–2008	Dinamo Brest	3	(0)
2009–2010	Baranovichi	56	(4)
2011–2014	Granit Mikashevichi	106	(7)
2015	Baranovichi	14	(1)
2016	Slonim	7	(0)
2021–2023	Niva Dolbizno	35	(4)
- * Club domestic league appearances and goals

Roman Hovavko (Belarusian: Раман Хаваўка; Russian: Роман Ховавко; born 2 March 1988) is a Belarusian former footballer.

== Honours ==
Dinamo Brest

- Belarusian Cup winner: 2006–07
