= Maksim Rybakov =

Belarusian footballer

Personal information
- Date of birth: 23 July 1993 (age 33)
- Place of birth: Shklov, Mogilev Oblast, Belarus
- Height: 1.71 m (5 ft 7 in)
- Position: Midfielder

Team information
- Current team: Spartak Shklov

Youth career
- 2010–2011: DYuSSh Suvorovets Minsk
- 2011–2013: Dnepr Mogilev

Senior career*
Years	Team	Apps	(Gls)
2010	Spartak Shklov	24	(0)
2011–2017	Dnepr Mogilev	92	(3)
2012	→ Dnepr-2 Mogilev	35	(15)
2018–2019	Belshina Bobruisk	11	(1)
2020–2021	Dnepr Mogilev	49	(11)
2022–	Spartak Shklov	4	(1)
- * Club domestic league appearances and goals as of 31 December 2022

Maksim Rybakov (Belarusian: Максiм Рыбакоў; Russian: Максим Рыбаков; born 23 July 1993) is a Belarusian footballer playing currently for Spartak Shklov.
