= Chebotar =

Chebotar is a Russian-language occupational surname derived from the occupation of chebotar, 'bootmaker'. Notable people with the surname include:

- Maksim Chebotar (born 1982), Moldovan footballer
- Serafima Chebotar (born 1975), Russian journalist and writer
- Vladislav Chebotar (born 1997), Russian sprint canoeist
