= Kots =

Kots may refer to the following people

- Aleksandr Kots (1880–1964), Russian zoologist
- Alexander Kots (journalist) (born 1978), Russian journalist
- Arkady Kots (1872–1943), Russian socialist poet of Jewish descent
- Khrystyna Kots-Hotlib (born 1983), Ukrainian singer and beauty pageant
- Nadezhda Ladygina-Kohts (1889–1963), Russian zoopsychologist
- Roman Kots (born 1984), Ukrainian football player

== See also ==
- KOTS, a radio station in New Mexico, U.S.
