= Litvinchuk =

Litvinchuk (Polish: Litwińczuk, Belarusian: Літвінчук, Ukrainian: Литвинчук, romanized: Lytvynchuk, Russian: Литвинчук) derived from the word litvin, "a Lithuanian" from the Grand Duchy of Lithuania. It may refer to:

- Artur Litvinchuk (born 1988), Belarusian male canoeist
- Ivan Lytvynchuk (1917–1952), commander of the military district of the Ukrainian Insurgent Army, war criminal
- Maryna Litvinchuk (born 1988), Belarusian female hockey player
- Mihail Litvinchuk (born 1980), Belarusian male footballer
- Petr Litvinchuk (born 1976), Belarusian male sport shooter
