= Alyaksandr Kalatsey =

Belarusian footballer (born 1988)

Personal information
- Date of birth: 27 January 1988 (age 38)
- Place of birth: Minsk, Belarusian SSR
- Height: 1.78 m (5 ft 10 in)
- Position: Midfielder

Youth career
- 2004–2007: BATE Borisov

Senior career*
Years	Team	Apps	(Gls)
2007	BATE Borisov	1	(0)
2007–2010	Vitebsk	10	(0)
2011–2012	Volna Pinsk	49	(7)
2013	Granit Mikashevichi	26	(0)
2014	Volna Pinsk	28	(2)
2015–2016	Smolevichi-STI	38	(1)
2016	Gomelzheldortrans	11	(1)

International career
2009	Belarus U21	3	(0)

Managerial career
- 2017–: Dinamo Brest (youth)
- * Club domestic league appearances and goals

Alyaksandr Kalatsey (Belarusian: Аляксандр Калацэй; Russian: Александр Колоцей; born 27 January 1988) is a Belarusian former professional footballer.

== Honours ==
BATE Borisov

- Belarusian Premier League champion: 2007
