= 2013 Belarusian Super Cup =

Naftan Novopolotsk	BATE Borisov
0	1
- Date: 17 March 2013
- Venue: Football Manege, Minsk
- Referee: Denis Scherbakov
- Attendance: 1,600

The 2013 Belarusian Super Cup was held on 17 March 2013 between the 2012 Belarusian Premier League champions winners BATE Borisov and the 2011–12 Belarusian Cup winners Naftan Novopolotsk. BATE won the match 1–0, claiming the trophy for the third time.

== Match details ==
17 March 2013
16:00 UTC+3

Naftan Novopolotsk	0 – 1	BATE Borisov
	Report	Sivakov 90+3'

Football Manege, Minsk
Attendance: 1,600
Referee: Denis Scherbakov (Minsk)

NAFTAN:
GK	16	(Belarus) Igor Dovgyallo
DF	33	(Belarus) Igor Zyulev	(yellow card) 34'
DF	23	(Belarus) Nikita Naumov
DF	30	(Belarus) Oleg Shkabara (c)	(yellow card) 64'
DF	3	(Belarus) Dzyanis Obrazaw	(yellow card) 33'	(substituted off) 42'
MF	17	(Belarus) Sergey Korsak
MF	35	(Ukraine) Ruslan Hunchak
MF	7	(Russia) Murat Khotov
MF	8	(Ukraine) Yuriy Chonka		(substituted off) 66'
MF	12	(Belarus) Alyaksandr Dzegtseraw		(substituted off) 82'
FW	11	(Russia) Aleksandr Alumona
Substitutes:
GK	13	(Belarus) Aleksandr Adamenko
DF	4	(Belarus) Nikolai Branfilov
FW	9	(Russia) Andrei Prudnikov		(substituted on) 82'
FW	10	(Belarus) Yahor Zubovich		(substituted on) 42'
MF	21	(Belarus) Yevgeniy Yelezarenko		(substituted on) 66'
MF	22	(Belarus) Andrey Baranok
DF	26	(Belarus) Uladzislaw Kasmynin
Manager:
(Russia) Pavel Kucherov

BATE:
GK	35	(Belarus) Andrey Harbunow
DF	23	(Belarus) Edhar Alyakhnovich
DF	41	(Belarus) Vital Hayduchyk
DF	14	(Belarus) Artsyom Radzkow (c)
DF	18	(Belarus) Maksim Bardachow	(yellow card) 53'	(substituted off) 69'
MF	25	(Belarus) Dzmitry Baha
MF	77	(Belarus) Filip Rudzik		(substituted off) 80'
MF	17	(Belarus) Alyaksandr Pawlaw		(substituted off) 61'
MF	9	(Belarus) Illya Aleksiyevich		(substituted off) 74'
MF	43	(Belarus) Pavel Nyakhaychyk
FW	20	(Belarus) Vitali Rodionov		(substituted off) 81'
Substitutes:
GK	34	(Belarus) Artem Soroko
MF	2	(Belarus) Dzmitry Likhtarovich		(substituted on) 80'
FW	7	(Belarus) Artem Kontsevoy		(substituted on) 81'
FW	11	(Armenia) Zaven Badoyan
FW	13	(Belarus) Dzmitry Mazalewski		(substituted on) 61'
MF	32	(Belarus) Mikhail Sivakov		(substituted on) 74'
MF	42	(Belarus) Maksim Volodko	(yellow card) 72'	(substituted on) 69'
Manager:
(Belarus) Viktor Goncharenko

== See also ==
- 2012 Belarusian Premier League
- 2011–12 Belarusian Cup
