= Yawhen Kuntsevich =

Belarusian footballer

Yawhyen Kuntsevich
Personal information
- Date of birth: 16 August 1988 (age 38)
- Place of birth: Vitebsk, Byelorussian SSR, Soviet Union
- Height: 1.79 m (5 ft 10 1/2 in)
- Position: Defender

Youth career
- 2007–2008: Naftan Novopolotsk

Senior career*
Years	Team	Apps	(Gls)
2007–2008	Naftan Novopolotsk	0	(0)
2009–2010	Belshina Bobruisk	39	(2)
2011–2013	BATE Borisov	6	(0)
2013	→ Belshina Bobruisk (loan)	7	(0)
2013	→ Granit Mikashevichi (loan)	13	(0)
2014–2015	Granit Mikashevichi	29	(0)
2016	Slavia Mozyr	19	(0)
2017	Torpedo Minsk	12	(0)
2017	Smolevichi-STI	7	(0)

International career
2011	Belarus U21	1	(0)
- * Club domestic league appearances and goals as of 31 December 2017

Yawhen Yawhenavich Kuntsevich (Belarusian: Яўген Яўгенавіч Кунцэвіч; Russian: Евгений Кунцевич (Yevgeni Kuntsevich); born 16 August 1988) is a Belarusian former professional football player.

== Honours ==
BATE Borisov

- Belarusian Premier League champion: 2011, 2012
- Belarusian Super Cup winner: 2011
