= Dzyanis Parechyn =

Belarusian footballer

Personal information
- Date of birth: 17 November 1979 (age 46)
- Place of birth: Minsk, Belarusian SSR
- Height: 1.92 m (6 ft 3 1/2 in)
- Position: Goalkeeper

Youth career
- SDYuShOR-5 Minsk

Senior career*
Years	Team	Apps	(Gls)
1997	Ataka-407 Minsk	5	(0)
1998	Rogachev	5	(0)
1999	Smena-BATE Minsk	3	(0)
2000	RShVSM-Olympia Minsk	12	(0)
2001	BATE Borisov	0	(0)
2002–2004	Naftan Novopolotsk	48	(0)
2005	Polotsk	14	(0)
2006	Minsk	5	(0)
2008–2009	Granit Mikashevichi	28	(0)
2010–2012	Torpedo-BelAZ Zhodino	19	(0)
2013	Zvezda-BGU Minsk	6	(0)
2014	Bereza-2010	10	(0)
- * Club domestic league appearances and goals

Dzyanis Parechyn (Belarusian: Дзяніс Парэчын; Russian: Денис Паречин; born 17 November 1979) is a Belarusian former professional footballer who played as a goalkeeper. He was most recently the goalkeeping coach of Polish club Stal Stalowa Wola.
