= Ruslan Danilyuk =

Belarusian footballer

Personal information
- Date of birth: 12 May 1974 (age 52)
- Place of birth: Brest, Belarusian SSR
- Height: 1.90 m (6 ft 3 in)
- Position: Defender

Youth career
- 1992–1994: Dinamo Brest

Senior career*
Years	Team	Apps	(Gls)
1991	Dinamo Brest	1	(0)
1992–1994	Brestbytkhim Brest	42	(5)
1995	Dynamo-Gazovik Tyumen	11	(0)
1997	Dinamo Brest	12	(0)
1998–2002	Slavia Mozyr	83	(5)
2003–2004	Belshina Bobruisk	56	(5)
2005	Naftan Novopolotsk	3	(0)
2005–2006	Belshina Bobruisk	41	(4)
2008	Dinamo Brest	3	(0)
2008	Neman Grodno	10	(0)
2009	Bereza	16	(2)
- * Club domestic league appearances and goals

Ruslan Danilyuk (Belarusian: Руслан Данілюк; Russian: Руслан Николаевич Данилюк; born 12 May 1974) is a retired Belarusian professional footballer.

== Honours ==
Slavia Mozyr

- Belarusian Premier League champion: 2000
- Belarusian Cup winner: 1999–2000
