= Roman Goginashvili =

Georgian footballer

Personal information
- Date of birth: 23 January 1984 (age 42)
- Place of birth: Gori, Georgian SSR
- Height: 1.82 m (5 ft 11 1/2 in)
- Position: Midfielder

Senior career*
| Years | Team | Apps | (Gls) |
| 2000–2001 | Dila Gori | 4 | (0) |
| 2002–2004 | Locomotive Tbilisi | 28 | (1) |
| 2004–2006 | Sheriff Tiraspol | 26 | (0) |
| 2006–2008 | Dinamo Brest | 37 | (1) |
| 2008 | Shakhtyor Soligorsk | 2 | (0) |
| 2009–2010 | Olimpik-Shuvalan Baku | 10 | (2) |
| 2010–2014 | Dila Gori | 23 | (1) |
| 2014 | Liakhvi Tskhinvali | 10 | (10) |
- * Club domestic league appearances and goals as of 31 December 2014

Roman Goginashvili (Georgian: რომან გოგინაშვილი; born 23 January 1984) is a retired Georgian footballer.

== Career ==
Goginashvili began his career with FC Dila Gori and FC Lokomotivi Tbilisi. He moved to FC Sheriff Tiraspol in July 2004, and then joined FC Dinamo Brest in January 2006. After two seasons with Dinamo Brest, with whom he won the Belarusian Cup 2006-07, he joined Shakhtyor Soligorsk.
