= Stanislav Gnedko =

Belarusian footballer

Personal information
- Date of birth: 7 January 1987 (age 39)
- Place of birth: Minsk, Belarusian SSR
- Height: 1.80 m (5 ft 11 in)
- Position: Midfielder

Youth career
- 2001–2004: Dinamo Minsk

Senior career*
Years	Team	Apps	(Gls)
2004	Dinamo-Juni Minsk	5	(0)
2005	Molodechno-2000	18	(0)
2006–2008	Torpedo Zhodino	27	(0)
2008–2009	Belshina Bobruisk	35	(0)
2010	Volna Pinsk	12	(1)
2010	Veras Nesvizh	13	(0)
2011	Gorodeya	18	(1)
2012	Granit Mikashevichi	26	(0)
2013–2014	Slutsk	44	(2)
2015	Alashkert	12	(0)
2015	Smorgon	16	(0)
2016–2017	Volna Pinsk	49	(2)
2018	Lida	24	(1)
2019–2020	Granit Mikashevichi	39	(1)

International career
2007	Belarus U21	5	(0)
- * Club domestic league appearances and goals as of 31 December 2020

Stanislav Gnedko (Belarusian: Станіслаў Гнядзько; Russian: Станислав Гнедько; born 7 January 1987) is a Belarusian former professional footballer.

On 6 August 2020, the BFF banned Gnedko from Belarusian football for 2 years for his involvement in the match fixing.
