= Vyacheslav Krivulets =

Belarusian footballer

Personal information
- Date of birth: 27 February 1998 (age 28)
- Place of birth: Mikashevichi, Brest Oblast, Belarus
- Height: 1.82 m (6 ft 0 in)
- Position: Defender

Team information
- Current team: Mikashevichi

Youth career
- 2014–2017: Shakhtyor Soligorsk

Senior career*
Years	Team	Apps	(Gls)
2016–2018	Shakhtyor Soligorsk	0	(0)
2018	→ Belshina Bobruisk (loan)	23	(3)
2019	Torpedo Minsk	1	(0)
2020	Shakhtyor Petrikov	2	(0)
2021–2022	Partizan Soligorsk	19	(1)
2022–2023	Bobovnya Kopyl	8	(1)
2023–	Mikashevichi	6	(1)

International career
2017	Belarus U19	2	(0)
- * Club domestic league appearances and goals as of 31 December 2023

Vyacheslav Krivulets (Belarusian: Вячаслаў Крывулец; Russian: Вячеслав Кривулец; born 27 February 1998) is a Belarusian professional footballer who plays for Mikashevichi.
