= Alyaksandr Dzyameshka =

Belarusian footballer and coach

Personal information
- Date of birth: 7 November 1986 (age 40)
- Place of birth: Brest, Belarusian SSR
- Height: 1.74 m (5 ft 8 1/2 in)
- Position: Midfielder

Youth career
- 2003–2005: Dinamo Brest

Senior career*
Years	Team	Apps	(Gls)
2005–2010	Dinamo Brest	30	(1)
2010–2011	Granit Mikashevichi	57	(7)
2012–2014	Gorodeya	68	(8)
2015–2017	Dinamo Brest	49	(6)
2018	Rukh Brest	21	(3)
2021	Brestzhilstroy	9	(9)

Managerial career
- 2017–2018: Dinamo Brest (youth)
- 2018–2022: Rukh Brest (assistant)
- 2023–2024: Dinamo Brest (assistant)
- 2024: Dinamo Brest (caretaker)
- * Club domestic league appearances and goals

Alyaksandr Dzyameshka (Belarusian: Аляксандр Дзямешка; Russian: Александр Демешко; born 7 November 1986) is a Belarusian football coach and former player.

== Honours ==
Dinamo Brest

- Belarusian Cup winner: 2006–07, 2016–17, 2017–18
