= Andrey Tsevan =

Belarusian footballer

Personal information
- Date of birth: 15 March 1986 (age 40)
- Place of birth: Baranovichi, Byelorussian SSR, Soviet Union
- Height: 1.66 m (5 ft 5 in)
- Position: Midfielder

Team information
- Current team: Rukh Brest (assistant coach)

Youth career
- 2001–2002: Dinamo Brest

Senior career*
Years	Team	Apps	(Gls)
2002–2011	Dinamo Brest	154	(22)
2012–2014	Shakhtyor Soligorsk	37	(1)
2015–2016	Dinamo Brest	1	(0)
2018–2019	Rukh Brest	13	(1)
2021	Brestzhilstroy	1	(0)

International career
2005–2006	Belarus U21	5	(0)

Managerial career
- 2018–: Rukh Brest (assistant)
- * Club domestic league appearances and goals as of 31 December 2021

Andrey Tsevan (Belarusian: Андрэй Цэван; Russian: Андрей Цеван; born 15 March 1986) is a Belarusian former footballer.

== Honours ==
Dinamo Brest

- Belarusian Cup winner: 2006–07

Shakhtyor Soligorsk

- Belarusian Cup winner: 2013–14
