= Syarhey Kavalyuk =

Belarusian footballer

Personal information
- Date of birth: 7 January 1980 (age 46)
- Place of birth: Brest, Belarusian SSR
- Height: 1.77 m (5 ft 9 1/2 in)
- Position: Midfielder

Youth career
- 1996–1998: Dinamo Brest

Senior career*
Years	Team	Apps	(Gls)
1996–2004	Dinamo Brest	125	(8)
1996	→ Berest Brest	15	(0)
1997–1998	→ Dinamo-2 Brest	29	(2)
1999	→ Vodokanal Brest	16	(1)
2005	Granit Mikashevichi	9	(0)
2005	Baranovichi	13	(0)
2006–2007	Neman Grodno	48	(6)
2008–2010	Dinamo Brest	64	(2)
2010	Torpedo Zhodino	15	(0)
2011	Granit Mikashevichi	13	(0)
2012	Dnepr Mogilev	26	(2)
2013	Vitebsk	13	(3)
2013–2014	Lida	28	(2)
2014	Smorgon	6	(0)
2015	Lida	10	(4)
2015–2016	Neman Grodno	25	(0)
2016	Granit Mikashevichi	13	(3)
2017	Smolevichi-STI	21	(8)
2018	Lida	12	(0)
2018–2019	Rukh Brest	9	(3)
2020–2021	Malorita	22	(2)
- * Club domestic league appearances and goals as of 31 December 2021

Syarhey Kavalyuk (Belarusian: Сяргей Кавалюк; Russian: Серге́й Ковалюк; born 7 January 1980) is a Belarusian former professional footballer.
