= Pavel Dovgulevets =

Belarusian footballer

Personal information
- Date of birth: 26 December 1977 (age 48)
- Place of birth: Minsk, Belarusian SSR
- Height: 1.84 m (6 ft 0 in)
- Position: Defender

Team information
- Current team: Minsk (administrator)

Youth career
- SDYuSShOR-5 Minsk

Senior career*
Years	Team	Apps	(Gls)
1997–2000	Dinamo Minsk	30	(3)
2000–2005	Darida Minsk Raion	79	(2)
2005–2006	Kryvbas Kryvyi Rih	10	(0)
2006–2007	Dinamo Brest	15	(0)
2007–2008	Torpedo Zhodino	30	(0)
2009	Gorodeya	21	(0)

International career
1999	Belarus U21	4	(0)

Managerial career
- 2011–: Minsk (administrator)
- * Club domestic league appearances and goals

Pavel Dovgulevets (Russian: Павел Довгулевец: born 26 December 1977) is a Belarusian former footballer.

Dovgulevets previously played for Dinamo Minsk (1997–2000), Darida Minsk Raion (2000–2005), Dinamo Brest (2006–2007) and Torpedo Zhodino (2007–2008) in the Belarusian Premier League and Kryvbas Kryvyi Rih in the Ukrainian Premier League (2005–2006).

== Honours ==
Dinamo Minsk

- Belarusian Premier League champion: 1997

Dinamo Brest

- Belarusian Cup winner: 2006–07
