= Maksim Bordachyov =

Belarusian football defender

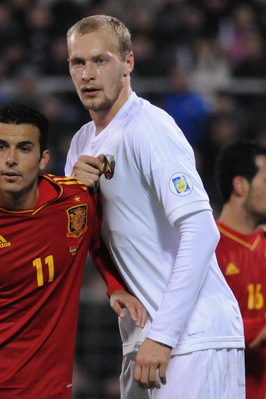
- Bordachyov with Belarus in 2012

Personal information
- Full name: Maksim Aleksandrovich Bordachyov
- Date of birth: 18 May 1986 (age 40)
- Place of birth: Kustovichi, Byelorussian SSR, Soviet Union
- Height: 1.88 m (6 ft 2 in)
- Position: Defender

Youth career
- 2001–2003: Neman Grodno

Senior career*
Years	Team	Apps	(Gls)
2003–2005	Neman Grodno	26	(0)
2006–2008	MTZ-RIPO Minsk	55	(6)
2009–2013	BATE Borisov	110	(7)
2013	→ Tom Tomsk (loan)	14	(1)
2014–2017	Tom Tomsk	47	(0)
2014–2015	→ Rostov (loan)	20	(0)
2017	→ Orenburg (loan)	1	(0)
2017–2020	Shakhtyor Soligorsk	26	(1)
2020	→ Torpedo-BelAZ Zhodino (loan)	25	(2)
2021	Torpedo-BelAZ Zhodino	12	(0)
2021–2023	BATE Borisov	37	(1)
Total		373	(18)

International career
2004	Belarus U19	3	(0)
2005–2009	Belarus U21	16	(0)
2009–2021	Belarus	54	(3)
- * Club domestic league appearances and goals

Maksim Aleksandrovich Bordachyov (Belarusian: Максім Аляксандравіч Бардачоў; Russian: Максим Александрович Бордачёв; born 18 May 1986) is a Belarusian former professional footballer who played as a defender.

== Career ==
=== Club ===
On 10 August 2013, Bordachyov moved to Tom Tomsk on loan till the end of 2014, with the option to make the move permanent. In January 2014, Tomsk made Bordachyov's move permanent, signing him to a 3.5-year contract.

Bordachyov joined Rostov on a season-long loan deal from Tom Tomsk on 31 July 2014.

=== International ===
Bordachyov made his international debut for Belarus on 1 April 2009, in a game against Kazakhstan in a World Cup qualifier. He scored for the national team twice – against Kazakhstan in October 2009 and against Saudi Arabia in November 2009.

=== Honours ===
MTZ-RIPO Minsk

- Belarusian Cup winner: 2007–08

BATE Borisov

- Belarusian Premier League champion: 2009, 2010, 2011, 2012, 2013
- Belarusian Cup winner: 2009–10
- Belarusian Super Cup winner: 2011, 2013, 2022

Shakhtyor Soligorsk

- Belarusian Cup winner: 2018–19

== Career statistics ==
=== International goals ===
#	Date	Venue	Opponent	Score	Result	Competition
1	10 October 2009	Regional Sport Complex Brestskiy, Brest, Belarus	Kazakhstan	1 – 0	4–0	World Cup 2010 qualifier
2	14 November 2009	Prince Mohamed bin Fahd Stadium, Dammam, Saudi Arabia	Saudi Arabia	1 – 0	1–1	Friendly
3	7 September 2020	Almaty Central Stadium, Almaty, Kazakhstan	Kazakhstan	1 – 0	2–1	2020–21 UEFA Nations League C
