= Andrey Shcharbakow =

Belarusian footballer

Personal information
- Date of birth: 31 January 1991
- Place of birth: Vitebsk, Belarusian SSR, Soviet Union
- Date of death: 17 December 2018 (aged 27)
- Place of death: Tolochin, Vitebsk Oblast, Belarus
- Height: 1.90 m (6 ft 3 in)
- Position: Goalkeeper

Youth career
- 2008–2010: Vitebsk

Senior career*
| Years | Team | Apps | (Gls) |
| 2010 | Vitebsk | 0 | (0) |
| 2011–2014 | BATE Borisov | 2 | (0) |
| 2013 | → Vitebsk (loan) | 15 | (0) |
| 2013 | → Slutsk (loan) | 12 | (0) |
| 2014 | → Belshina Bobruisk (loan) | 13 | (0) |
| 2015 | Belshina Bobruisk | 2 | (0) |
| 2016–2018 | Vitebsk | 29 | (0) |
| Total | | 73 | (0) |

International career
| 2010–2012 | Belarus U-21 | 15 | (0) |
- * Club domestic league appearances and goals

Andrey Anatolyevich Shcharbakow (Belarusian: Андрэй Шчарбакоў; Russian: Андрей Щербаков (Andrey Scherbakov); 31 January 1991 – 17 December 2018) was a Belarusian professional footballer.

On 17 December 2018 he died in a car accident.

== Honours ==
BATE Borisov

- Belarusian Premier League champion: 2011
- Belarusian Super Cup winner: 2011
