= Alyaksandr Davidovich =

Belarusian footballer

Personal information
- Date of birth: 13 February 1981 (age 45)
- Place of birth: Minsk, Belarusian SSR
- Position: Defender

Team information
- Current team: Minsk-2 (manager)

Youth career
- Torpedo Minsk

Senior career*
Years	Team	Apps	(Gls)
1999	AFViS-RShVSM	11	(0)
2000–2001	Dinamo-Juni Minsk	39	(1)
2002	Žalgiris Vilnius	23	(3)
2002–2003	Arsenal Kharkiv	25	(0)
2003	Helios Kharkiv	13	(1)
2004	Lokomotiv Vitsebsk	8	(0)
2005	Slavia Mozyr	18	(0)
2006–2009	Smorgon	81	(4)
2010	Granit Mikashevichi	12	(1)
2010	Veras Nesvizh	8	(0)
2011–2012	Slutsk	54	(2)
2014	Belita-Viteks Uzda	23	(2)

Managerial career
- 2025–: Minsk-2
- * Club domestic league appearances and goals

Alyaksandr Davidovich (Belarusian: Аляксандр Давідовіч; Russian: Александр Давидович; born 13 February 1981) is a Belarusian professional football coach and former player.
