= Roman Zhersh =

Ukrainian footballer

Personal information
- Full name: Roman Valeriyovych Zhersh
- Date of birth: 2 December 1985 (age 40)
- Place of birth: Kovel, Ukrainian SSR, Soviet Union
- Height: 1.71 m (5 ft 7 in)
- Position: Midfielder

Youth career
- 1998–1999: Kovel-Volyn Kovel
- 2000–2002: Volyn Lutsk

Senior career*
| Years | Team | Apps | (Gls) |
| 2001–2006 | Volyn Lutsk | 37 | (0) |
| 2001 | → Kovel-Volyn-2 Kovel | 13 | (1) |
| 2002 | → Borysfen-2 Boryspil (loan) | 3 | (0) |
| 2002 | → Kovel-Volyn-2 Kovel | 22 | (3) |
| 2004 | → Ikva Mlyniv (loan) | 4 | (1) |
| 2007–2008 | Dinamo Brest | 13 | (0) |
| 2008–2009 | Zakarpattia Uzhhorod | 10 | (0) |
| 2009 | Nyva Ternopil | 16 | (0) |
| 2010 | Zirka Kirovohrad | 5 | (1) |
- * Club domestic league appearances and goals

Roman Zhersh (Ukrainian: Роман Жерш; born 2 December 1985) is a Ukrainian former footballer.

He previously played for FC Dinamo Brest in Belarus.
