= Artsyom Radzkow =

Belarusian footballer (born 1985)

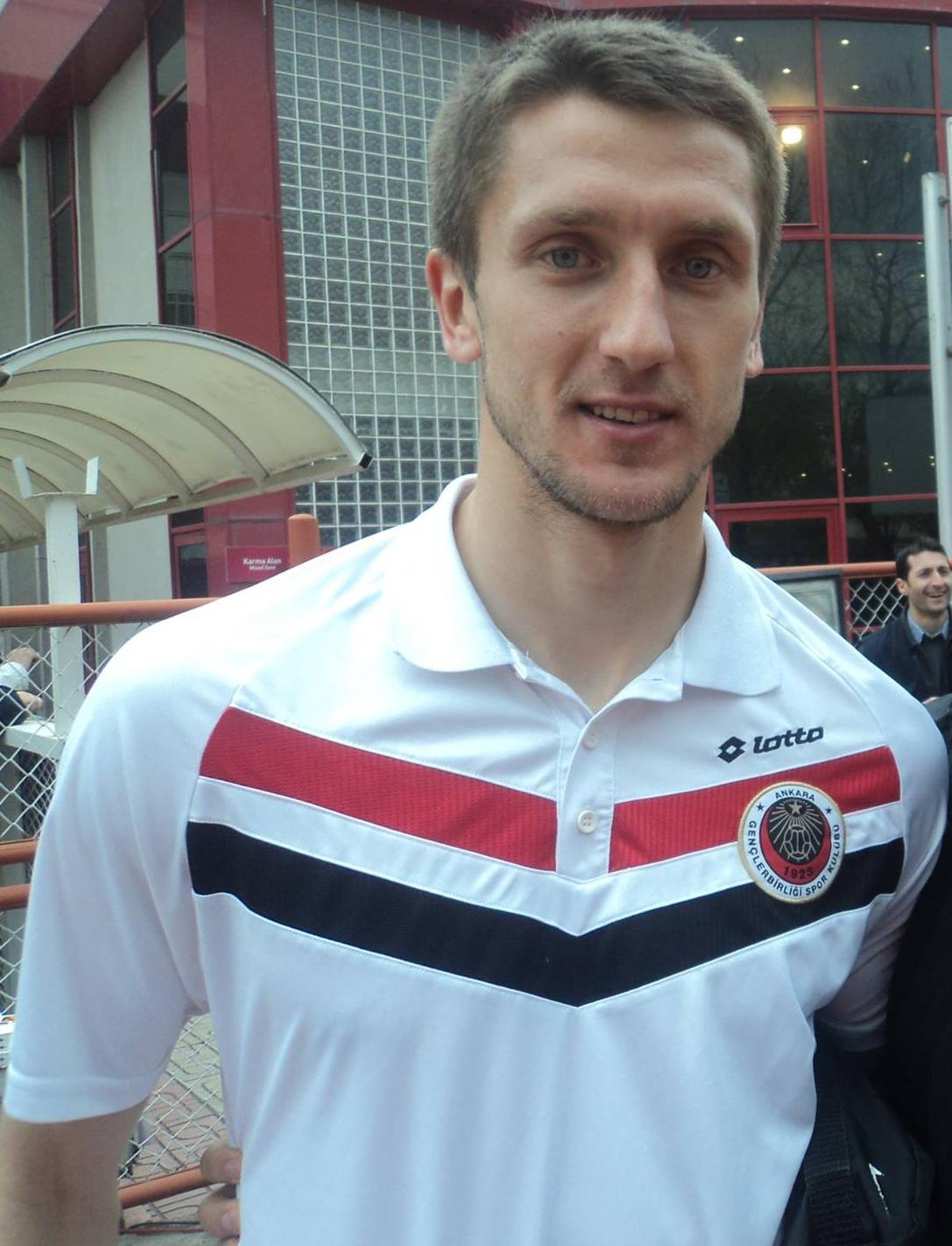
- Radzkow with Gençlerbirliği in 2014

Personal information
- Full name: Artsyom Alyaksandravich Radzkow
- Date of birth: 26 August 1985 (age 41)
- Place of birth: Mogilev, Belarusian SSR, Soviet Union
- Height: 1.87 m (6 ft 2 in)
- Position: Defender

Team information
- Current team: Aris Limassol (manager)

Youth career
- 2000–2002: Dnepr-Transmash Mogilev

Senior career*
Years	Team	Apps	(Gls)
2001–2002	Dnepr-Transmash Mogilev	0	(0)
2002	→ Spartak Shklov (loan)	1	(0)
2002–2007	BATE Borisov	69	(2)
2004	→ Torpedo Zhodino (loan)	17	(2)
2008	Khimki	8	(1)
2009–2013	BATE Borisov	95	(6)
2013	→ Terek Grozny (loan)	7	(0)
2014–2015	Gençlerbirliği	5	(0)

International career
2003–2004	Belarus U19	6	(0)
2004–2006	Belarus U21	18	(0)
2006–2013	Belarus	13	(0)

Managerial career
- 2017–2020: Energetik-BGU Minsk (youth)
- 2019–2020: Belarus U21 (assistant)
- 2020: BATE Borisov (assistant)
- 2021–2022: Isloch Minsk Raion
- 2024–2025: Dynamo Makhachkala (assistant)
- 2025–2026: Aris Limassol
- 2026–: Aris Limassol
- * Club domestic league appearances and goals

Artsyom Alyaksandravich Radzkow (Belarusian: Арцём Аляксандравiч Радзькоў; Russian: Артём Александрович Радьков; born 26 August 1985) is a Belarusian former player, currently manager of Cypriot First Division club Aris Limassol.

== Career ==
Radzkow was a member of Belarus national team. He ended his playing in late 2015 after being unable to fully recover from a series of injuries.

== Honours ==
BATE Borisov

- Belarusian Premier League: 2006, 2007, 2009, 2010, 2011, 2012, 2013
- Belarusian Cup: 2005–06, 2009–10
- Belarusian Super Cup: 2010, 2011, 2013
