= Edgar Olekhnovich =

Belarusian professional footballer

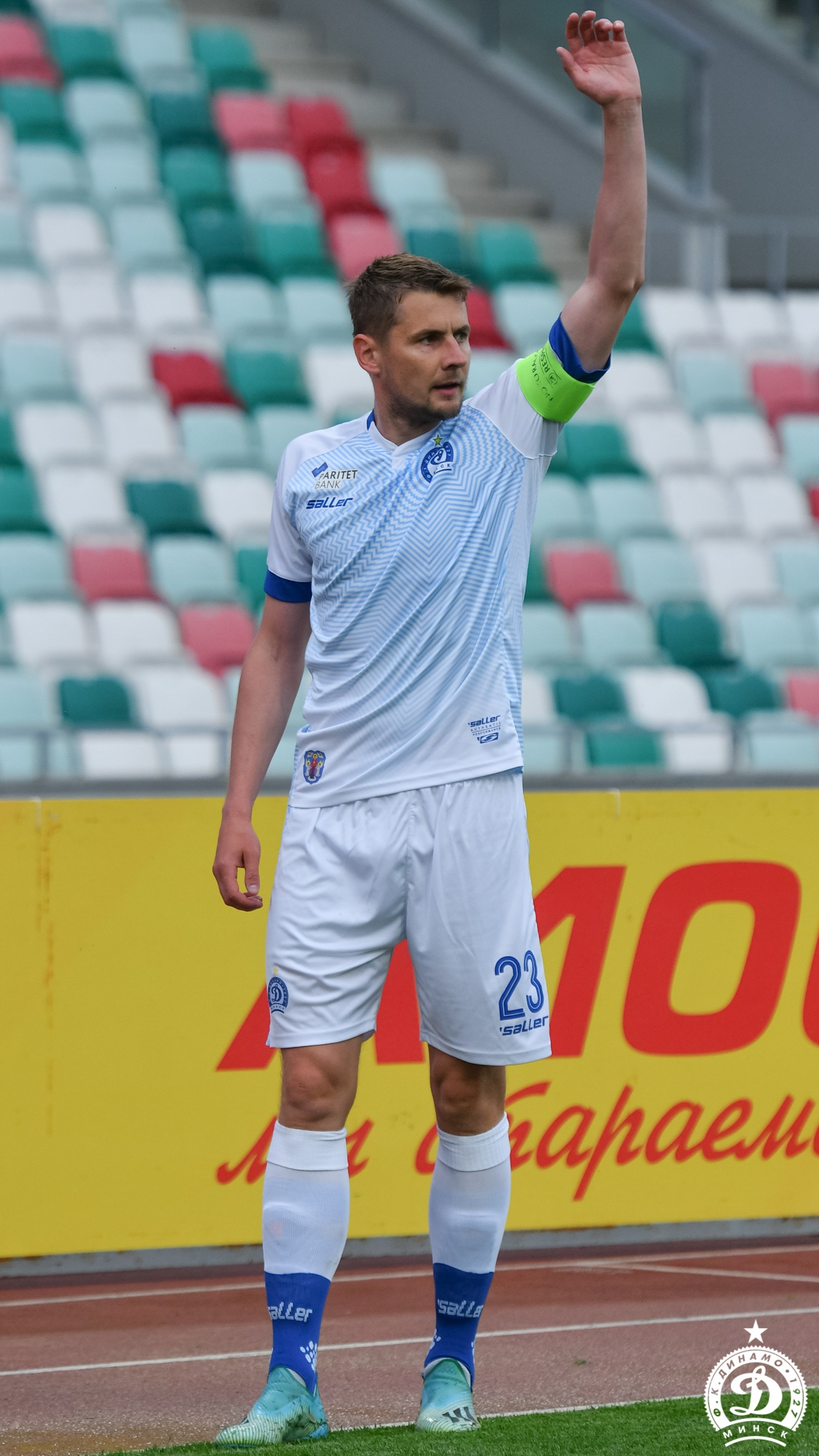

Personal information
- Full name: Edgar Stanislavovich Olekhnovich
- Date of birth: 17 May 1987 (age 39)
- Place of birth: Brest, Belarusian SSR
- Height: 1.83 m (6 ft 0 in)
- Position: Midfielder

Youth career
- 2005–2006: Dinamo Brest

Senior career*
Years	Team	Apps	(Gls)
2007–2009	Dinamo Brest	54	(4)
2010–2016	BATE Borisov	130	(7)
2017–2018	Shakhtyor Soligorsk	26	(3)
2018	→ Torpedo-BelAZ Zhodino (loan)	28	(1)
2019–2020	Dinamo Minsk	38	(0)
2021–2024	Dinamo Brest	87	(2)

International career
2013–2014	Belarus	15	(1)
- * Club domestic league appearances and goals as of 31 December 2024

Edgar Stanislavovich Olekhnovich (Belarusian: Эдгар Станіслававіч Аляхновіч; Russian: Эдгар Станиславович Олехнович; born 17 May 1987) is a Belarusian former professional footballer.

== Career ==
Olekhnovich made his debut for the senior national team of his country on 21 March 2013, after coming on as a substitute in a friendly match against Jordan.

== Honours ==
BATE Borisov

- Belarusian Premier League champion: 2010, 2011, 2012, 2013, 2014, 2015, 2016
- Belarusian Cup winner: 2010, 2015
- Belarusian Super Cup winner: 2010, 2011, 2013, 2014, 2015, 2016

== International goal ==
#	Date	Venue	Opponent	Score	Result	Competition
1	4 September 2014	Borisov Arena, Borisov, Belarus	Tajikistan	4–1	6–1	Friendly
