= Aleksandr Shubladze =

Russian footballer

Personal information
- Full name: Aleksandr Yuryevich Shubladze
- Date of birth: 21 March 1985 (age 41)
- Place of birth: Samtredia, Georgian SSR, Soviet Union
- Height: 1.82 m (6 ft 0 in)
- Position: Midfielder

Youth career
- Lokomotivi Samtredia
- SUOR Stavropol

Senior career*
Years	Team	Apps	(Gls)
2002	FC Volgar-Gazprom-2 Astrakhan	25	(1)
2002	Spartak-Kavkaztransgaz Izobilny	17	(0)
2003	Dynamo Stavropol	26	(2)
2004	Lisma-Mordovia Saransk	22	(1)
2005	Zenit-2 Saint Petersburg	7	(1)
2005	Spartak Kostroma	6	(0)
2006	Belshina Bobruisk	25	(0)
2007	Dnepr Mogilev	13	(2)
2008	Stavropol (amateur)		
2009–2011	Mashuk-KMV Pyatigorsk	73	(4)
2011–2013	Baltika Kaliningrad	27	(1)
2013–2014	Chayka Peschanokopskoye (amateur)		
2014–2018	Dongazdobycha Sulin		
2019	Azov		
- * Club domestic league appearances and goals

Aleksandr Yuryevich Shubladze (Russian: Александр Юрьевич Шубладзе; born 21 March 1985) is a Russian former professional football player.

== Club career ==
He played 3 seasons in the Russian Football National League for FC Lisma-Mordovia Saransk and FC Baltika Kaliningrad.
