= Alyaksandr Buloychyk =

Belarusian footballer

Personal information
- Date of birth: 30 August 1979 (age 47)
- Position: Defender

Senior career*
Years	Team	Apps	(Gls)
1997	Ataka-Aura Minsk	3	(0)
1998	Kommunalnik Slonim	3	(0)
1999	Lida	30	(0)
2000	Luninets	28	(1)
2001–2006	Torpedo Zhodino	137	(12)
2006–2008	Vitebsk	34	(3)
2008–2009	Granit Mikashevichi	33	(1)
- * Club domestic league appearances and goals

Alyaksandr Buloychyk (Belarusian: Аляксандр Булойчык; Russian: Александр Булойчик; born 30 August 1979) is a Belarusian retired professional footballer.
