= Ihor Kryvobok =

Ukrainian footballer

Personal information
- Full name: Ihor Fedorovych Kryvobok
- Date of birth: 28 July 1978 (age 48)
- Place of birth: Kharkiv, Ukrainian SSR
- Height: 1.87 m (6 ft 1 1/2 in)
- Position: Forward

Senior career*
Years	Team	Apps	(Gls)
1999–2000	Metalurh-2 Zaporizhzhia	40	(8)
2001–2002	Kryvbas Kryvyi Rih	1	(0)
2002–2003	Olkom Melitopol	27	(6)
2003–2004	Mykolaiv	40	(6)
2005	Spartak Sumy	12	(1)
2005	Krymteplytsia Molodizhne	2	(0)
2006	Spartak Ivano-Frankivsk	16	(5)
2006–2007	Neman Grodno	33	(4)
2008	Granit Mikashevichi	12	(3)
2009	Smorgon	5	(0)
2010–2011	Torpedo-BelAZ Zhodino	64	(15)
2012	Neman Grodno	24	(6)
2013	Lida	11	(10)
2013–2014	Naftan Novopolotsk	31	(12)
2015	Neman Grodno	6	(1)
2015	Smorgon	11	(7)
2016	Lida	9	(1)
2016	Smorgon	2	(0)
- * Club domestic league appearances and goals as of 31 December 2016

Ihor Kryvobok (Ukrainian: Ігор Федорович Кривобок; born 28 July 1978) is a former Ukrainian footballer.
