= Pavel Nyakhaychyk =

Belarusian footballer (born 1988)

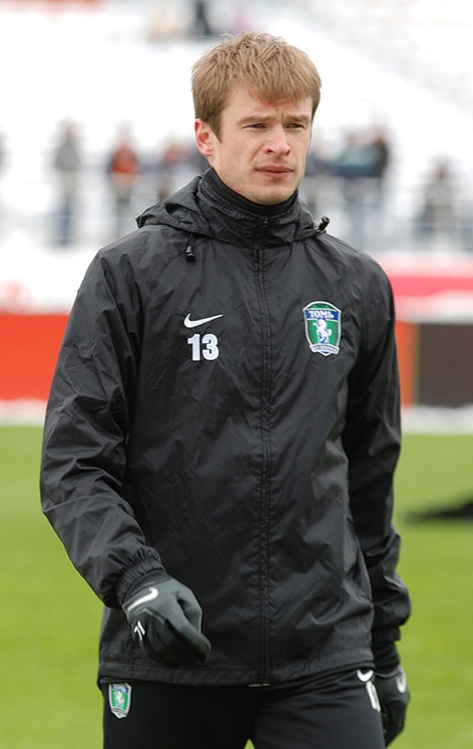
- Nyakhaychyk in 2014

Personal information
- Full name: Pavel Alyaksandrovich Nyakhaychyk
- Date of birth: 15 July 1988 (age 38)
- Place of birth: Minsk, Belarusian SSR
- Height: 1.80 m (5 ft 11 in)
- Position: Midfielder

Youth career
- 2005–2007: BATE Borisov

Senior career*
Years	Team	Apps	(Gls)
2007–2011	BATE Borisov	99	(18)
2011–2012	Dynamo Moscow	13	(1)
2013	BATE Borisov	24	(2)
2014–2016	Tom Tomsk	54	(14)
2016–2017	Orenburg	16	(4)
2017–2019	Dinamo Brest	60	(19)
2020–2021	BATE Borisov	50	(18)
Total		316	(76)

International career
2009–2011	Belarus U21	22	(4)
2011	Belarus Olympic	2	(1)
2011–2020	Belarus	37	(3)
- * Club domestic league appearances and goals

Pavel Alyaksandravich Nyakhaychyk (Belarusian: Павел Аляксандравіч Няхайчык; Russian: Павел Александрович Нехайчик (Pavel Aleksandrovich Nekhaychik); born 15 July 1988) is a Belarusian former professional footballer. He played as an attacking midfielder.

== Career ==
After joining FC Tom Tomsk on trial in January 2014, Nyakhaychyk went on to sign a 2.5 year contract with the club in February of the same year. He scored in the 1–1 draw against FC Zenit St. Petersburg in a UEFA Champions League fixture on 21 October 2008.

== Honours ==
BATE Borisov

- Belarusian Premier League champion: 2007, 2008, 2009, 2010, 2011, 2013
- Belarusian Cup winner: 2009–10, 2019–20, 2020–21
- Belarusian Super Cup winner: 2010, 2011, 2013

Dinamo Brest

- Belarusian Premier League champion: 2019
- Belarusian Cup winner: 2017–18
- Belarusian Super Cup winner: 2018, 2019

== International career ==
Nyakhaychyk received his first call-up to the senior team of his country in March 2011 for a Euro 2012 qualifier against Albania and a friendly match versus Canada, but did not make an appearance in these games. His senior side debut came on 10 August 2011 in the 1:0 win against Bulgaria in an exhibition match. Nyakhaychyk was a member of the Belarus U21 that finished in 3rd place at the 2011 UEFA European Under-21 Football Championship. He made 4 appearances, 3 of them as a starter. He has also been capped twice for the Belarus Olympic, scoring one goal in the process.

=== International goals ===
Scores and results list Belarus' goal tally first.

#	Date	Venue	Opponent	Score	Result	Competition
1.	18 November 2014	Borisov Arena, Borisov, Belarus	Mexico	3–2	3–2	Friendly
2.	13 November 2017	Ramaz Shengelia Stadium, Kutaisi, Georgia	Georgia	2–2	2–2	Friendly
3.	23 February 2020	Al Hamriya Sports Club Stadium, Al Hamriyah, United Arab Emirates	Uzbekistan	1–0	1–0	Friendly
