= Dzmitry Mazalewski =

Belarusian former footballer (born 1985)

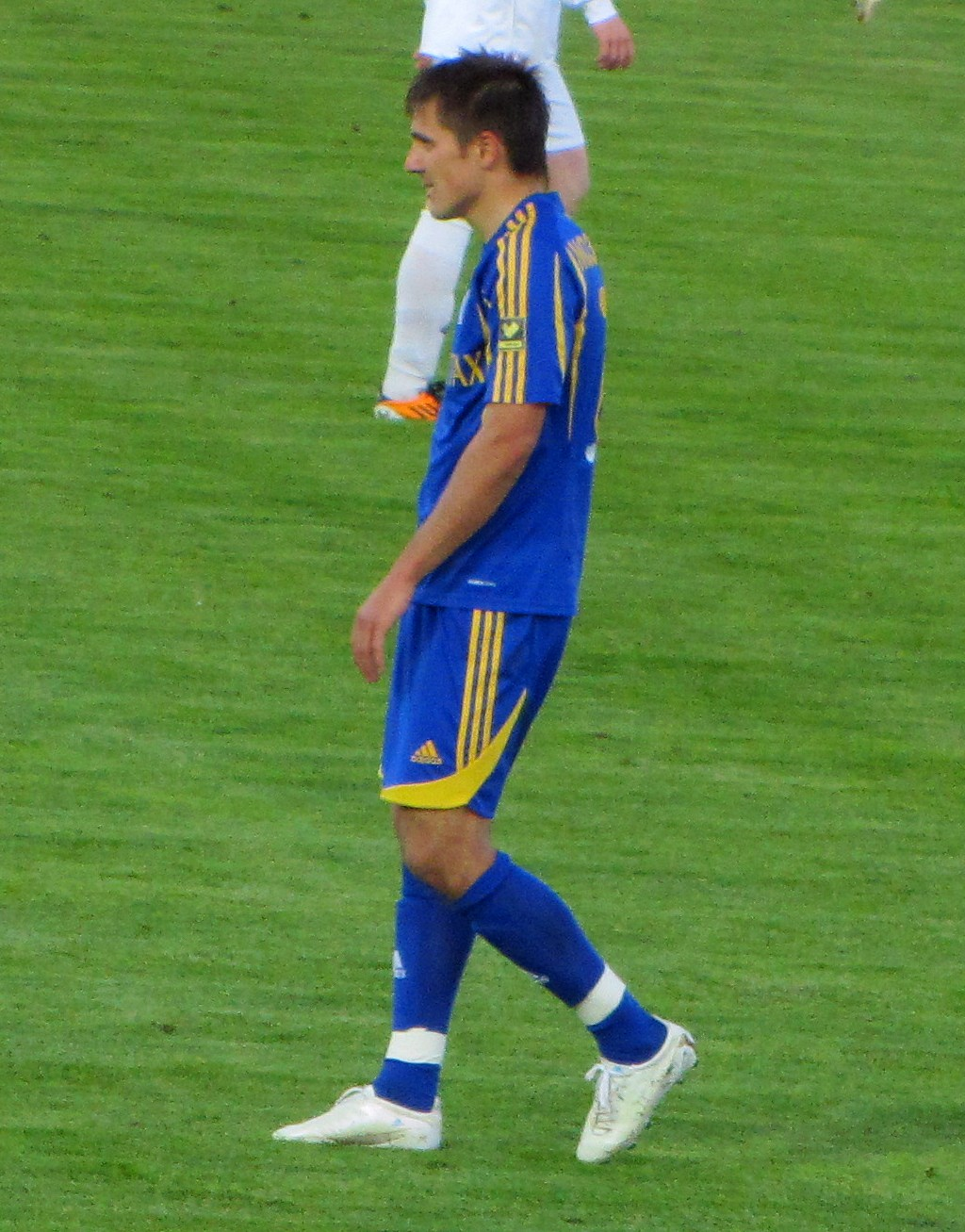

Personal information
- Full name: Dzmitry Dzmitryyevich Mazalewski
- Date of birth: 30 April 1985 (age 41)
- Place of birth: Brest, Byelorussian SSR, Soviet Union
- Height: 1.76 m (5 ft 9 in)
- Position: Forward

Youth career
- 2002–2003: Dinamo Brest

Senior career*
Years	Team	Apps	(Gls)
2003–2011	Dinamo Brest	228	(58)
2012–2016	BATE Borisov	51	(14)
2016	Hong Kong Rangers	0	(0)
2017	Dinamo Brest	10	(1)
2017	Atlantas	16	(5)
Total		305	(78)

International career
2005–2006	Belarus U21	6	(0)
2007–2012	Belarus	3	(0)

Managerial career
- 2018–: Dinamo Brest (coach)
- * Club domestic league appearances and goals

Dzmitry Dzmitryyevich Mazalewski (Belarusian: Дзмітрый Дзмітрыевiч Мазалеўскі; Russian: Дмитрий Дмитриевич Мозолевский; born 30 April 1985) is a Belarusian former footballer.

== Career ==
From 2012 to 2016 Mazalewski played for Belarusian Premier League giant club BATE Borisov. BATE had previously expressed in interest in the winter 2009, but the deal fell through. In September 2013 Mazalewski sustained a serious injury which forced him to withdraw from football for almost two years. He fully recovered by the summer of 2015.

In October 2016 he joined Hong Kong Rangers, but the contract was terminated just a few days later and Mazalewski left the club without playing any matches.

== Honours ==
Dinamo Brest

- Belarusian Cup winner: 2006–07, 2016–17, 2017–18

BATE Borisov

- Belarusian Premier League champion: 2012, 2013, 2015, 2016
- Belarusian Super Cup winner: 2013, 2016
