= Roman Harkusha =

Belarusian footballer

Personal information
- Full name: Roman Harkusha
- Date of birth: 2 June 1984 (age 42)
- Place of birth: Minsk, Belarusian SSR
- Height: 1.81 m (5 ft 11 1/2 in)
- Position: Defender

Youth career
- 2002: BATE Borisov

Senior career*
Years	Team	Apps	(Gls)
2003	Darida Minsk Raion	5	(0)
2004	Zvezda-BGU Minsk	20	(0)
2005	BATE Borisov	10	(0)
2006	Bereza	11	(2)
2006–2009	Veras Nesvizh	66	(3)
2009	Ararat Yerevan	10	(2)
2010	Veras Nesvizh	28	(6)
2011	Impuls Dilijan	11	(2)
2011–2013	Gorodeya	45	(3)
2013–2014	Smorgon	32	(0)
2015–2017	Viktoriya Maryina Gorka	56	(15)

International career
2002	Belarus U21	2	(0)
- * Club domestic league appearances and goals as of 4 December 2017

Roman Harkusha (Belarusian: Раман Гаркуша; born 2 June 1984) is a Belarusian former footballer.
