= Dmitri Ekimov =

Belarusian-Russian footballer

Personal information
- Full name: Dmitri Vladimirovich Ekimov
- Date of birth: 5 February 1971 (age 55)
- Place of birth: Moscow, Russian SFSR, Soviet Union
- Height: 1.93 m (6 ft 4 in)
- Position: Goalkeeper

Senior career*
| Years | Team | Apps | (Gls) |
| 1991–1993 | Dinamo Brest | 58 | (0) |
| 1994 | TRASKO Moscow | 15 | (0) |
| 1994–1996 | Dinamo Brest | 64 | (0) |
| 1997–1999 | Dinamo Minsk | 19 | (0) |
| 2000–2001 | Tom Tomsk | 30 | (0) |
| 2001–2004 | Gazovik-Gazprom Izhevsk | 108 | (0) |
| 2005 | Spartak-MZhK Ryazan | 4 | (0) |
| 2005–2006 | Lokomotiv Chita | 54 | (0) |
| 2007 | Dinamo Brest | 16 | (0) |
| 2007–2012 | Podlasie Biała Podlaska | 71 | (0) |

International career
| 1996 | Belarus | 1 | (0) |

Managerial career
- 2014: Vologda (GK coach)
- 2015–2017: Lokomotiv Moscow (youth) (GK coach)
- 2018–2019: Lokomotiv Moscow II (GK coach)
- 2020–2021: Spartak Moscow (youth) (GK coach)
- 2021–: Lokomotiv Moscow (youth) (GK coach)
- * Club domestic league appearances and goals

Dmitri Vladimirovich Ekimov (Belarusian: Дзмiтрый Уладзіміравіч Якімаў, Russian: Дмитрий Владимирович Екимов; born 5 February 1971) is a Belarusian-Russian former professional footballer who played as a goalkeeper. He currently works as a goalkeeping coach for Lokomotiv Moscow's youth teams. He made one appearance for the Belarus national team in 1996.
