= Alyaksandr Valadzko =

Belarusian footballer (born 1986)

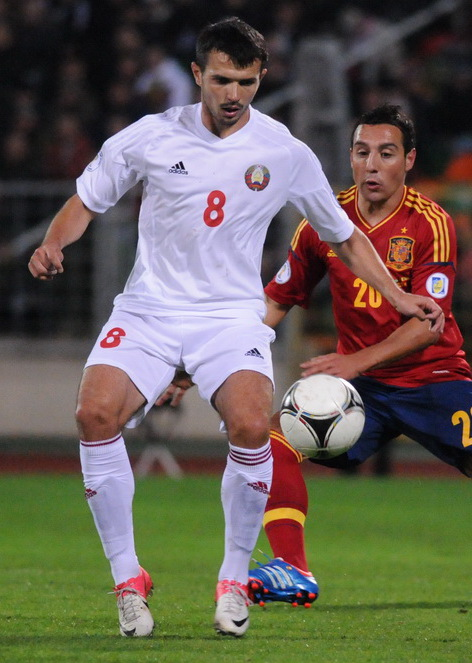
- Valadzko with Belarus in 2012

Personal information
- Full name: Alyaksandr Pawlavich Valadzko
- Date of birth: 8 June 1986 (age 40)
- Place of birth: Motal, Belarusian SSR, Soviet Union
- Height: 1.77 m (5 ft 10 in)
- Position: Midfielder

Team information
- Current team: Belshina Bobruisk (caretaker manager)

Youth career
- 2004–2005: Dinamo Brest

Senior career*
Years	Team	Apps	(Gls)
2005–2008	Dinamo Brest	62	(3)
2008–2017	BATE Borisov	212	(14)
2018	Shakhter Karagandy	26	(1)
2019	Shakhtyor Soligorsk	0	(0)
2020	BATE Borisov	4	(0)
Total		304	(18)

International career
2006–2009	Belarus U21	28	(1)
2012–2014	Belarus	9	(1)

Managerial career
- 2021–2022: BATE Borisov (assistant)
- 2023: Dinamo Brest (assistant)
- 2024–2025: Shakhtyor Soligorsk (assistant)
- 2025–2026: Belshina Bobruisk (assistant)
- 2026–: Belshina Bobruisk (caretaker)
- * Club domestic league appearances and goals

Alyaksandr Pawlavich Valadzko, also spelled sometimes as Aleksandr Pavlovich Volodko (Belarusian: Алякса́ндр Па́ўлавіч Валадзько́; Russian: Алекса́ндр Па́влович Володько́; Polish: Aleksander Wołodko; born 18 June 1986) is a Belarusian former professional footballer who played as a midfielder.

== Career ==
Valadzko spent 10 years playing for BATE Borisov as a central defender or defensive midfielder. He was part of the Belarus U21 national team that participated in the 2009 UEFA European Under-21 Football Championship. On 19 September 2012, Valadzko opened the scoring and assisted the third goal in BATE's 3–1 away victory over Lille, which was the first Champions League group stage win in the team's history. Following his strong performances for BATE, he was called up to the senior national team for the first time in October 2012 for two 2014 World Cup qualifiers against Spain and Georgia. He made his debut on 12 October 2012, playing the first half of the 4–0 loss against the Iberians.

== Personal life ==
Valadzko is of Polish descent.

== Career statistics ==
Scores and results list Belarus' goal tally first.

#	Date	Venue	Opponent	Score	Result	Competition
1.	6 February 2013	Bellis Sports Centre, Belek, Turkey	Hungary	1–1	1–1	Friendly

== Honours ==
Dinamo Brest

- Belarusian Cup: 2006–07

BATE Borisov

- Belarusian Premier League: 2008, 2009, 2010, 2011, 2012, 2013, 2014, 2015, 2016, 2017
- Belarusian Cup: 2009–10, 2014–15
- Belarusian Super Cup: 2010, 2011, 2014, 2016, 2017

Shakhtyor Soligorsk

- Belarusian Cup: 2018–19
