= Antuan Mayorov =

Belarusian footballer, coach, and referee

Personal information
- Date of birth: 13 August 1971 (age 55)
- Height: 1.82 m (6 ft 0 in)
- Position: Midfielder

Youth career
- DYuSSh Red Flag Vitebsk

Senior career*
Years	Team	Apps	(Gls)
1988–1991	KIM Vitebsk	67	(5)
1991–1992	Khimik Severodonetsk	47	(8)
1992	Lokomotiv Vitebsk	1	(0)
1993	KIM Vitebsk	28	(3)
1994–1996	Dinamo Minsk	62	(10)
1997–1998	Dinamo-93 Minsk	21	(4)
1998	Lokomotiv Nizhny Novgorod	6	(1)
1999	Torpedo-Viktoriya Nizhny Novgorod	17	(1)
1999	Torpedo-MAZ Minsk	3	(0)
2001	Žalgiris Vilnius	6	(0)
2001	Gomel	6	(0)
2016	Oshmyany	2	(0)

Managerial career
- 2013–2015: Zorka-BDU Minsk (assistant)
- 2016–2020: Oshmyany
- 2021–2022: Vitebsk (women)
- 2023: Naftan Novopolotsk (assistant)
- 2023: Maxline Vitebsk (assistant)
- 2023–2024: Slonim-2017
- 2024–: Orsha (assistant)
- * Club domestic league appearances and goals

Antuan Mayorov (Belarusian: Антуан Маёраў; Russian: Антуан Майоров; born 13 August 1971) is a Belarusian association football coach and former player and referee.

After retiring from playing, Mayorov worked as a referee for several seasons in Belarusian Premier League, after which he switched to coaching.

His father Ivan Mayorov was also a referee, who worked in Soviet and Belarusian leagues in the 1980s and 90s.

== Honours ==
Dinamo Minsk

- Belarusian Premier League champion: 1993–94, 1994–95, 1995
- Belarusian Cup winner: 1993–94

Gomel

- Belarusian Cup winner: 2001–02
