= Ionas Pyatrawskas =

Belarusian footballer and coach

Ionas Pyatrauskas
Personal information
- Date of birth: 18 May 1979 (age 47)
- Place of birth: Minsk, Belarusian SSR
- Height: 1.82 m (5 ft 11 1/2 in)
- Position: Defender

Youth career
- 1997–1999: Smena Minsk

Senior career*
Years	Team	Apps	(Gls)
1997–1998	Smena-BATE Minsk	32	(0)
1999–2000	BATE Borisov	4	(0)
1999	→ Smena-BATE Minsk	16	(0)
2000	→ RShVSM-Olympia Minsk	23	(0)
2001–2005	Darida Minsk Raion	119	(3)
2006–2011	Minsk	149	(10)
2012	Minsk-2	6	(1)

International career
2000	Belarus U21	1	(0)

Managerial career
- 2012: Minsk-2 (assistant)
- 2012–2015: Minsk (women)
- * Club domestic league appearances and goals

Ionas Pyatrauskas (Belarusian: Іонас Пятраўскас; Russian: Ионас Пятраускас; born 18 May 1979) is a Belarusian professional football coach and former player of Lithuanian origin.

== Honours ==
- Belarusian Premier League champion: 1999
