= Mihail Litvinchuk =

Belarusian footballer

Personal information
- Date of birth: 21 July 1980 (age 46)
- Place of birth: Brest, Byelorussian SSR, Soviet Union (now Belarus)
- Height: 1.82 m (5 ft 11 1/2 in)
- Position: Forward

Youth career
- 1996–1998: Dinamo Brest

Senior career*
Years	Team	Apps	(Gls)
1997–2001	Dinamo Brest	37	(3)
1997–1998	→ Dinamo-2 Brest	29	(6)
1999–2000	→ Vodokanal Brest	26	(17)
2002	Świt Nowy Dwór Mazowiecki		
2002–2004	Lokomotiv Minsk	59	(23)
2005	Torpedo Zhodino	15	(1)
2006–2007	Minsk	42	(4)
2008–2009	Smorgon	35	(7)
2009–2010	Podlasie Biała Podlaska	12	(0)
2010	Gomel	28	(6)
2011–2012	Gorodeya	42	(11)
2012	Slutsk	12	(3)
2013	Smorgon	19	(0)
2014	Kolos-Druzhba	5	(1)
2015	Kobrin	10	(0)
2021	Brestzhilstroy	3	(0)

International career
1998	Belarus U18		
- * Club domestic league appearances and goals

Mihail Stepanovich Litvinchuk (Belarusian: Міхаіл Літвінчук; Russian: Михаил Степанович Литвинчук; born 21 June 1980) is a Belarusian former professional footballer who played as a forward.

== Career ==
Born in Brest, Litvinchuk has spent most of his career playing football in the Belarusian Premier League. He has won the league twice with FC Dinamo Brest, once with FC Minsk and once with FC Gomel. He has also played abroad with Świt Nowy Dwór Mazowiecki and Podlasie Biała Podlaska.

== Honours ==
Gomel

- Belarusian Cup: 2010–11
