= Alyaksandr Chayka =

Belarusian footballer and coach

Personal information
- Full name: Alyaksandr Leonidovich Chayka
- Date of birth: 27 January 1976 (age 50)
- Place of birth: Minsk, Belarusian SSR
- Height: 1.83 m (6 ft 0 in)
- Position: Midfielder

Senior career*
Years	Team	Apps	(Gls)
1992–1997	Dnepr Mogilev	137	(28)
1998–2000	Alania Vladikavkaz	68	(5)
2000–2001	Krylia Sovetov Samara	22	(0)
2002	Rostselmash Rostov-on-Don	7	(0)
2002–2003	Dynamo-SPb St. Petersburg	48	(5)
2004–2005	Tobol Kostanay	42	(0)
2006–2007	Dnepr Mogilev	30	(2)

International career
1993–1997	Belarus U21	10	(0)
1995–2000	Belarus	16	(0)

Managerial career
- 2008–2012: Dnepr Mogilev (reserves)
- 2013–: Dnepr Mogilev (assistant)
- * Club domestic league appearances and goals

Alyaksandr Leonidovich Chayka (Belarusian: Аляксандр Чайка; Russian: Александр Леонидович Чайка; born 27 January 1976) is a Belarusian professional football coach and a former player.

== Playing career ==
He made his professional debut in the Belarusian Premier League in 1992 for FC Dnepr Mogilev.

From 2004 to 2005 Chayka played for Tobol Kostanay in Kazakhstan.
