= Andrey Dzivakow =

Belarusian footballer

Personal information
- Date of birth: 7 October 1978 (age 48)
- Place of birth: Minsk, Belarusian SSR
- Height: 1.80 m (5 ft 11 in)
- Position: Defender

Youth career
- 1994–1996: Ataka Minsk

Senior career*
Years	Team	Apps	(Gls)
1996–1997	Ataka Minsk	8	(0)
1998	Kommunalnik Slonim	14	(1)
1999	BATE Borisov	11	(1)
1999	Vitbich-Dinamo-Energo Vitebsk	14	(1)
2000	RShVSM-Olympia Minsk	1	(0)
2000–2002	BATE Borisov	19	(0)
2002–2006	Torpedo Zhodino	113	(9)
2007–2009	Vitebsk	79	(0)
2010	Minsk	10	(0)
2011	Torpedo-BelAZ Zhodino	31	(2)
2012–2015	Osipovichi	83	(7)
- * Club domestic league appearances and goals as of 2 December 2015

Andrey Dzivakow (Belarusian: Андрэй Дзівакоў; Russian: Андрей Диваков; born 7 October 1978) is a former Belarusian professional footballer.

== Honours ==
BATE Borisov

- Belarusian Premier League champion: 1999
