= Roman Kots =

Ukrainian footballer

Personal information
- Date of birth: 12 September 1984 (age 42)
- Place of birth: Lutsk, Ukrainian SSR, Soviet Union
- Height: 1.89 m (6 ft 2 in)
- Position: Defender

Youth career
- 2000–2001: Volyn Lutsk

Senior career*
Years	Team	Apps	(Gls)
2001–2003	Kovel-Volyn-2 Kovel	42	(0)
2003–2006	Volyn Lutsk	6	(0)
2004	→ Ikva Mlyniv (loan)	10	(0)
2004	→ Nistru Otaci (loan)	0	(0)
2005	→ Zhetysu (loan)	22	(0)
2007–2008	Dinamo Brest	19	(0)
2008–2009	Zakarpattia Uzhhorod	8	(0)
2010	Svitiaz Shatsk		
2011–2012	Mykolaiv	3	(0)
- * Club domestic league appearances and goals as of 31 December 2012

Roman Kots (Ukrainian: Роман Коц; born 12 September 1984) is a retired Ukrainian footballer.
