= Alyaksandr Yurevich =

Belarusian footballer (born 1979)

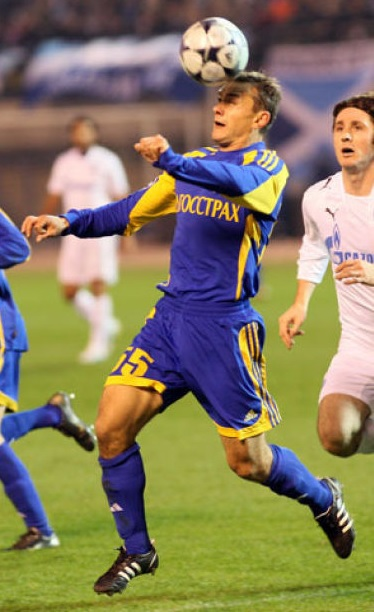
- Yurevich with BATE Borisov

Personal information
- Full name: Alyaksandr Uladzimirovich Yurevich
- Date of birth: 8 August 1979 (age 47)
- Place of birth: Lida, Grodno Oblast, Belarusian SSR
- Height: 1.74 m (5 ft 9 in)
- Position: Defender

Youth career
- 1995–1996: Lida

Senior career*
Years	Team	Apps	(Gls)
1995–1999	Lida	55	(2)
2000–2007	Shakhtyor Soligorsk	198	(10)
2007	Karpaty Lviv	10	(0)
2008–2013	BATE Borisov	142	(1)
2014–2016	Shakhtyor Soligorsk	84	(2)

International career
1997	Belarus U18	3	(0)
2000–2001	Belarus U21	16	(1)
2006–2011	Belarus	32	(0)

Managerial career
- 2017–2019: Shakhtyor Soligorsk (reserves)
- 2020–2023: Belarus U17
- 2023: Dinamo Brest
- * Club domestic league appearances and goals

Alyaksandr Uladzimiravich Yurevich (Belarusian: Аляксандр Юрэвіч; born 8 August 1979) is a Belarusian football coach and former player.

== Career ==
Yurevich last played for Shakhtyor Soligorsk and appeared for the Belarus national team, including qualifying matches for the 2010 FIFA World Cup. He is a defender, preferably left back. He has formerly played for BATE Borisov, where he served as vice-captain of the team.

== Honours ==
Shakhtyor Soligorsk

- Belarusian Premier League: 2005
- Belarusian Cup: 2003–04, 2013–14

BATE Borisov

- Belarusian Premier League: 2008, 2009, 2010, 2011, 2012, 2013
- Belarusian Cup: 2009–10
- Belarusian Super Cup: 2010, 2011
