= Uladzimir Maroz =

Belarusian footballer

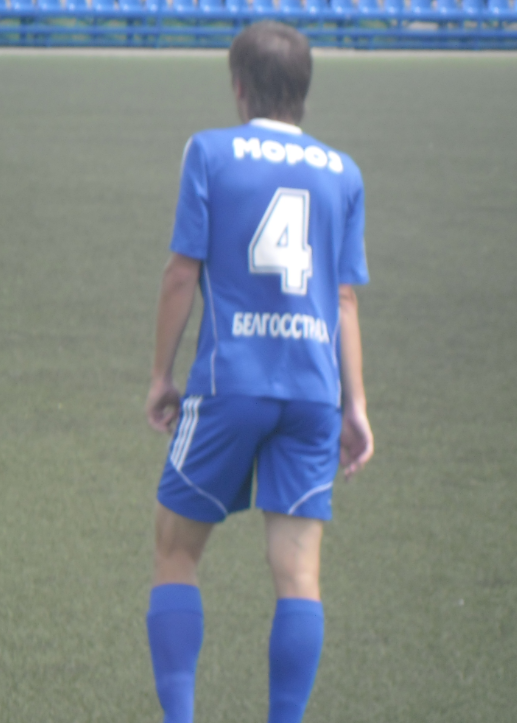

Personal information
- Date of birth: 4 September 1985 (age 41)
- Place of birth: Zhodino, Belarusian SSR
- Height: 1.86 m (6 ft 1 in)
- Position: Midfielder

Team information
- Current team: Dnepr Mogilev

Youth career
- 2003–2006: Torpedo Zhodino

Senior career*
Years	Team	Apps	(Gls)
2003–2006	Torpedo Zhodino	70	(5)
2007	Lokomotiv Minsk	13	(3)
2007–2008	Metalurh Zaporizhya	0	(0)
2008	Darida Minsk Raion	11	(1)
2009	Dinamo Brest	10	(0)
2010–2011	Torpedo-BelAZ Zhodino	17	(1)
2011	→ Vitebsk (loan)	14	(1)
2012–2014	Dnepr Mogilev	56	(3)

International career
2005–2006	Belarus U21	15	(1)
- * Club domestic league appearances and goals as of 16 December 2014

Uladzimir Maroz (Belarusian: Уладзімір Мароз; Russian: Владимир Мороз; born 4 September 1985) is a retired Belarusian professional footballer.
