= Maksim Chebotar =

Moldovan footballer

Personal information
- Full name: Maksim Vitalyevich Chebotar
- Date of birth: 16 November 1982 (age 43)
- Place of birth: Bender, Moldovan SSR
- Height: 1.75 m (5 ft 9 in)
- Position: Defender

Youth career
- Dinamo Bender

Senior career*
Years	Team	Apps	(Gls)
2003–2005	Unisport-Auto Chişinău	53	(1)
2005–2006	Dinamo Bender	37	(1)
2007	Zvezda Serpukhov	25	(0)
2008	Nasaf Qarshi	2	(0)
2008	Dmitrov	32	(1)
2009	Zelenograd	31	(1)
2010	CSCA-Rapid Chişinău	34	(0)
2011	Torpedo Zhodino	26	(0)
2012	Okzhetpes	8	(0)
2012	Iskra-Stal	18	(1)
2013	Tiraspol	0	(0)
2013–2014	Saxan	21	(4)
- * Club domestic league appearances and goals as of 1 January 2015

Maksim Vitalyevich Chebotar (Russian: Максим Витальевич Чеботарь; born 16 November 1982) is a retired Moldovan professional football player.
