= FC Spartak Shklov =

FC Spartak
- Full name: Football Club Spartak
- Founded: 1992
- Ground: Spartak Stadium
- Capacity: 2,500
- Head Coach: Dmitriy Terentyev
- League: Belarusian Second League

FC Spartak Shklov is a football club based in Shklov, Mogilev Oblast, Belarus.

== History ==
The club was founded in 1992 and was included in Belarusian Second League for its inaugural season. The club played at the national level during 1992–1993, 1996, 2001–2010 and 2014–2015, including a two-year spell in Belarusian First League (during 2008–2009). In the rest of the seasons, they have been playing in Mogilev Oblast league.

In some of the seasons, the club was acting as a farm club of Dnepr Mogilev and had a close partnership with local sport schools, which is reflected in some of the club's past names:

- Spartak Shklov (1992–2000)
- Spartak-UOR-Dnepr Shklov (2001–2002)
- Spartak-UOR Shklov (2003–2004)
- Spartak Shklov (since 2005)

== Current squad ==
As of October 2023

Note: Flags indicate national team as defined under FIFA eligibility rules; some limited exceptions apply. Players may hold more than one non-FIFA nationality.

No.	Pos.	Nation	Player
—	GK	(Belarus) BLR	Vladislav Volodkov
—	GK	(Belarus) BLR	Ilya Nemtsov
—	DF	(Belarus) BLR	Aleksey Arzhanovich
—	DF	(Belarus) BLR	Yevgeniy Beglyak
—	DF	(Belarus) BLR	Vladislav Bubnov
—	DF	(Belarus) BLR	Bahdan Volkaw
—	DF	(Belarus) BLR	Maksim Demchenko
—	DF	(Belarus) BLR	Maksim Dombrov
—	DF	(Belarus) BLR	Bahdan Makaraw
—	DF	(Belarus) BLR	Ruslan Makaraw
—	DF	(Belarus) BLR	Dmitriy Pimenov
—	DF	(Belarus) BLR	Denis Schepov
—	MF	(Belarus) BLR	Sergey Gramakovskiy

No.	Pos.	Nation	Player
—	MF	(Belarus) BLR	Matvey Dedkov
—	MF	(Belarus) BLR	Ivan Dorogonko
—	MF	(Belarus) BLR	Artsyom Malakhaw
—	MF	(Belarus) BLR	Vladimir Mirankov
—	MF	(Belarus) BLR	Vladislav Tarasov
—	MF	(Belarus) BLR	Aleksandr Tishurov
—	MF	(Belarus) BLR	Vladislav Tustov
—	FW	(Belarus) BLR	Alyaksandr Barychewski
—	FW	(Belarus) BLR	Vladimir Belyakovich
—	FW	(Belarus) BLR	Stanislav Bulakh
—	FW	(Belarus) BLR	Aleksandr Losev
