= Alyaksandr Pawlaw =

Belarusian footballer (born 1984)

Personal information
- Date of birth: 18 August 1984 (age 42)
- Place of birth: Bialynichy, Mogilev Oblast, Byelorussian SSR, Soviet Union
- Height: 1.78 m (5 ft 10 in)
- Position: Midfielder

Team information
- Current team: Dinamo Minsk (assistant manager)

Youth career
- 2001–2002: Dnepr-Transmash Mogilev

Senior career*
Years	Team	Apps	(Gls)
2002–2008	Dnepr Mogilev	149	(21)
2009–2014	BATE Borisov	149	(22)
2015	Okzhetpes	28	(2)
2016	Shakhtyor Soligorsk	21	(3)
2017–2018	Dnepr Mogilev	52	(2)

International career
2002	Belarus U19	3	(0)
2002–2006	Belarus U21	15	(0)
2008–2013	Belarus	13	(0)

Managerial career
- 2020–2021: Energetik-BGU Minsk (reserves)
- 2021–2022: Energetik-BGU Minsk (assistant)
- 2022–2024: Vitebsk
- 2024–2025: Dinamo Minsk (assistant)
- 2025: Dinamo Minsk
- 2026–: Dinamo Minsk (assistant)
- * Club domestic league appearances and goals

Alyaksandr Valeryevich Pawlaw (Belarusian: Аляксандр Валер'евіч Паўлаў; Russian: Александр Валерьевич Павлов; born 18 August 1984) is a Belarusian professional football coach and former player.

== Career statistics ==
=== Club ===
As of Match played 8 November 2015

Appearances and goals by club, season and competition
Club	Season	League			National cup		Continental		Other		Total	
Club	Season	Division	Apps	Goals	Apps	Goals	Apps	Goals	Apps	Goals	Apps	Goals
Dnepr Mogilev	2002	Belarusian Premier League	7	0			–		–		7	0
Dnepr Mogilev	2003	Belarusian Premier League	28	0			–		–		28	0
Dnepr Mogilev	2004	Belarusian Premier League	16	1			–		–		16	1
Dnepr Mogilev	2005	Belarusian Premier League	23	10			–		–		23	10
Dnepr Mogilev	2006	Belarusian Premier League	24	3			–		–		24	3
Dnepr Mogilev	2007	Belarusian Premier League	25	2			–		–		25	2
Dnepr Mogilev	2008	Belarusian Premier League	26	5			–		–		26	5
Dnepr Mogilev	Total		149	21			0	0	0	0	149	21
BATE Borisov	2009	Belarusian Premier League	25	4			10	0	–		33	15
BATE Borisov	2010	Belarusian Premier League	28	2	2	0	9	3	1	0	33	9
BATE Borisov	2011	Belarusian Premier League	19	2	1	0	6	1	1	0	33	9
BATE Borisov	2012	Belarusian Premier League	21	3	1	0	11	2	1	0	33	9
BATE Borisov	2013	Belarusian Premier League	28	10	1	0	2	0	1	0	33	9
BATE Borisov	2014	Belarusian Premier League	28	1	2	0	4	0	1	0	33	9
BATE Borisov	Total		149	22	7	0	42	6	5	0	203	28
Okzhetpes	2015	Kazakhstan Premier League	28	2	2	0	–		–		30	2
Career total			326	45	9	0	42	6	5	0	382	51

=== International ===
Appearances and goals by national team and year
National team	Year	Apps	Goals
Belarus	2008	7	0
Belarus	2009	0	0
Belarus	2010	0	0
Belarus	2011	0	0
Belarus	2012	2	0
Belarus	2013	4	0
Total		13	0

== Honours ==
BATE Borisov

- Belarusian Premier League (6): 2009, 2010, 2011, 2012, 2013, 2014
- Belarusian Cup (1): 2009–10
- Belarusian Super Cup (4): 2010, 2011, 2013, 2014
