= Syarhey Irha =

Belarusian footballer

Sergey Irkha
Personal information
- Full name: Sergey Irkha
- Date of birth: 25 March 1984 (age 42)
- Place of birth: Grodno, Byelorussian SSR, Soviet Union
- Height: 1.89 m (6 ft 2 1/2 in)
- Position: Midfielder

Senior career*
| Years | Team | Apps | (Gls) |
| 2002–2004 | Slavia Mozyr | 33 | (1) |
| 2005–2006 | Torpedo Zhodino | 36 | (3) |
| 2006–2008 | Vitebsk | 47 | (3) |
| 2009 | Smorgon | 9 | (0) |
| 2009–2010 | Tauras Tauragė | 40 | (6) |
| 2011 | Torpedo-BelAZ Zhodino | 26 | (5) |
| 2012–2013 | Slavia Mozyr | 45 | (3) |
| 2014 | Vitebsk | 26 | (1) |
| 2021 | ZhKKh Grodno | 19 | (10) |
| 2022 | Neman-Belcard Grodno | 1 | (0) |

International career
| 2005–2006 | Belarus U21 | 3 | (0) |
- * Club domestic league appearances and goals as of 31 December 2022

Syarhey Irkha (Belarusian: Сяргей Ірха; Russian: Серге́й Ирха; born 25 March 1984) is a Belarusian former professional footballer.
