= FC Kobrin =

- Full name: Sport Club Kobrin
- Founded: 1992 (Brestbytkhim Brest); 1996 (FC Kobrin)
- Ground: Yunost Stadium, Kobrin
- Capacity: 3,300
- Head coach: Sergey Vysotskiy
- League: Belarusian Second League
Home colours	Away colours

FC Kobrin (Belarusian: Футбольны клуб Кобрын) is a Belarusian football club based in Kobryn, Brest Region.

== History ==
FC Kobrin was founded in 1992 in the city of Brest as Brestbytkhim Brest. The team made its debut in Belarusian Second League in 1992–93 season, and after winning the league from the first attempt they were promoted to the First League. In 1996, the team relocated to its current location in Kobryn, Brest Region. In early 1997 the team withdrew to the amateur level due to financial troubles. Kobrin returned to the Second League for 1998 and 1999 seasons and then again for one more season in 2006. In between these years and since 2007 Kobrin played on amateur level in Brest Oblast championship. The team also made a number of appearances in Belarusian Cup in recent seasons. Since 2013, the team once again rejoined Second League, and in 2014 joined First League replacing withdrawn Minsk-2. Since 2016 they returned to Brest Oblast league. Since 2016 they perform as Atlant Kobrin due to sponsorship deal.

In 2021 Kobrin rejoined Second League, after its expansion.

== Current squad ==
As of October 2023

Note: Flags indicate national team as defined under FIFA eligibility rules; some limited exceptions apply. Players may hold more than one non-FIFA nationality.

No.	Pos.	Nation	Player
—	GK	(Belarus) BLR	Yevgeniy Orobey
—	GK	(Belarus) BLR	Sergey Pushko
—	GK	(Belarus) BLR	Pavel Scherbatsevich
—	GK	(Belarus) BLR	Dmitry Yatskevich
—	DF	(Belarus) BLR	Artem Bychkovskiy
—	DF	(Belarus) BLR	Denis Vidruk
—	DF	(Belarus) BLR	Aleksey Dudarev
—	DF	(Belarus) BLR	Kirill Zaryuta
—	DF	(Belarus) BLR	Kirill Kot
—	DF	(Belarus) BLR	Oleg Obraztsov
—	DF	(Belarus) BLR	Andrey Pavlyukovets
—	DF	(Belarus) BLR	Aleksandr Sidoruk
—	DF	(Belarus) BLR	Artem Tolokovskiy
—	DF	(Belarus) BLR	Andrey Trofimuk
—	DF	(Belarus) BLR	Vladimir Shimchuk
—	MF	(Belarus) BLR	Anton Bogatko
—	MF	(Belarus) BLR	Denis Gnedko

No.	Pos.	Nation	Player
—	MF	(Belarus) BLR	Ignatiy Kalenchuk
—	MF	(Belarus) BLR	Dmitry Karpinchik
—	MF	(Belarus) BLR	Denis Kozlyuk
—	MF	(Belarus) BLR	Igor Litvinets
—	MF	(Belarus) BLR	Dmitriy Lukyanyuk
—	MF	(Belarus) BLR	Konstantin Maksak
—	MF	(Belarus) BLR	Gleb Soldatenkov
—	MF	(Belarus) BLR	Roman Trachuk
—	MF	(Belarus) BLR	Alyaksandr Charvyakow
—	MF	(Belarus) BLR	Aleksey Yakubovich
—	FW	(Belarus) BLR	Konstantin Veremeychuk
—	FW	(Belarus) BLR	Andrian Volodko
—	FW	(Belarus) BLR	Aleksandr Makhnach
—	FW	(Belarus) BLR	Aleksey Makhnach
—	FW	(Belarus) BLR	Maksim Trofimuk
—	FW	(Belarus) BLR	Aleksandr Yarmoshevich
