= FC Mikashevichi =

Association football club in Belarus

- Full name: Football Club Mikashevichi
- Founded: 1978; 47 years ago
- Ground: Granit Stadium, Mikashevichi
- Capacity: 500
- Manager: Aleksandr Samusevich
- League: Belarusian Second League
- 2020: 13th (First League) ▼
Home colours	Away colours

Granit Mikashevichi (Belarusian: Мiкашэвiчы, Russian: Микашевичи) is a Belarusian football club from Mikashevichy (Mikashevichi).

== History ==
The team started playing in the Belarusian Second League in 1994. In 1999, they made their debut in the First League, and in 2008 finally in the Premier League. After the relegation in 2009, they will again play in the First League.

=== Name changes ===
- 1978: FC Granit Mikashevichi is founded
- 2006: renamed to FC Mikashevichi
- 2007: renamed to FC Granit Mikashevichi
- 2023: renamed to FC Mikashevichi

== Current squad ==
As of October 2023

Note: Flags indicate national team as defined under FIFA eligibility rules; some limited exceptions apply. Players may hold more than one non-FIFA nationality.

No.	Pos.	Nation	Player
—	GK	(Belarus) BLR	Timofey Denisenya
—	GK	(Belarus) BLR	Pavel Yermolich
—	GK	(Belarus) BLR	Danil Rudnik
—	DF	(Belarus) BLR	Andrey Garbar
—	DF	(Belarus) BLR	Yevgeniy Zlotnik
—	DF	(Belarus) BLR	Vladislav Katvitskiy
—	DF	(Belarus) BLR	Yuriy Kozel
—	DF	(Belarus) BLR	Vyacheslav Krivulets
—	DF	(Belarus) BLR	Nikolay Meleshkevich
—	DF	(Belarus) BLR	Aleksandr Nikitich
—	MF	(Belarus) BLR	Sergey Aliferovich
—	MF	(Belarus) BLR	Denis Bayda
—	MF	(Belarus) BLR	Valeriy Gurlo
—	MF	(Belarus) BLR	Aleksandr Kitsura
—	MF	(Belarus) BLR	Daniil Komarovskiy

No.	Pos.	Nation	Player
—	MF	(Belarus) BLR	Ilya Kostykovich
—	MF	(Belarus) BLR	Mikhail Mamontov
—	MF	(Belarus) BLR	Pavel Pekarchik
—	MF	(Belarus) BLR	Andrey Khavrukov
—	MF	(Belarus) BLR	Vladimir Kharlanov
—	MF	(Belarus) BLR	Mikhail Shaban
—	MF	(Belarus) BLR	Vladislav Shalay
—	MF	(Belarus) BLR	Yegor Yarmolich
—	FW	(Belarus) BLR	Roman Aliferovich
—	FW	(Belarus) BLR	Nikolay Bagan
—	FW	(Belarus) BLR	Oleg Galaktionov
—	FW	(Belarus) BLR	Yegor Kovalevich
—	FW	(Belarus) BLR	Oleg Mikhnyuk
—	FW	(Belarus) BLR	Vitaliy Khalimonchik
—	FW	(Belarus) BLR	Sergey Yunchits

== League and Cup history ==
Season	Level	Pos	Pld	W	D	L	Goals	Points	Domestic Cup	Notes
1994–95	3rd	3	22	13	6	3	37–15	32		
1995	3rd	5	10	4	0	6	13–16	12	Round of 32	
1996	3rd	6	28	14	4	10	52–36	46	Round of 32	
1997	3rd	5	28	15	3	10	45–37	48		
1998	3rd	1	30	23	5	2	89–13	74		Promoted
1999	2nd	5	30	15	9	6	47–25	54		
2000	2nd	5	30	15	4	11	46–40	49	Round of 16	
2001	2nd	6	28	13	5	10	47–26	44	Round of 16	
2002	2nd	5	30	16	9	5	37–22	57	Round of 32	
2003	2nd	5	30	14	9	7	34–27	51	Round of 32	
2004	2nd	4	30	12	10	8	31–22	46	Round of 16	
2005	2nd	6	30	13	7	10	39–35	46	Round of 32	
2006	2nd	5	26	12	4	10	38–33	40	Round of 64	
2007	2nd	2	26	16	4	6	39–22	52	Round of 32	Promoted
2008	1st	10	30	8	12	10	35–34	36	Round of 64	
2009	1st	13	26	6	7	13	27–39	25	Quarter-finals	Relegated
2010	2nd	4	30	16	8	6	52–23	56	Round of 16	
2011	2nd	8	30	11	10	9	38–35	43	Round of 32	
2012	2nd	6	28	14	8	6	41–23	50	Round of 32	
2013	2nd	7	30	12	9	9	42–31	45	Round of 32	
2014	2nd	1	30	19	7	4	46–16	64	Round of 16	Promoted
2015	1st								Quarterfinals	
