= 2012–13 Belarusian Cup =

Tournament details
- Country: Belarus
- Teams: 48

Final positions
- Champions: Minsk (1st title)
- Runners-up: Dinamo Minsk

Tournament statistics
- Matches played: 47
- Goals scored: 143 (3.04 per match)
- Top goal scorer(s): Hernán Figueredo; Raman Vasilyuk; Kirill Premudrov; Pavel Kasinets (3 goals)

The 2012–13 Belarusian Cup was the 22nd season of the Belarusian annual cup competition. Contrary to the league season, it is conducted in a fall-spring rhythm. The first games were played on 13 June 2012. Minsk won the Cup and qualified for the second qualifying round of the 2013–14 UEFA Europa League.

== Participating clubs ==
The following teams took part in the competition:

2012 Belarusian Premier League all teams	2012 Belarusian First League all teams	2012 Belarusian Second League; 16 teams (of 20)	Winners of regional cups 6 teams
BATE Borisov; Shakhtyor Soligorsk; Gomel; Dinamo Minsk; Belshina Bobruisk; Torpedo-BelAZ Zhodino; Naftan Novopolotsk; Neman Grodno; Minsk; Brest; Slavia Mozyr	Vitebsk; Dnepr Mogilev; Gorodeya; SKVICH Minsk; Slutsk; Vedrich-97 Rechitsa; Volna Pinsk; Granit Mikashevichi; Polotsk; Smorgon; DSK Gomel; Rudensk; Khimik Svetlogorsk; Lida; Bereza-2010	Klechesk Kletsk; Belcard Grodno; Baranovichi; Beltransgaz Slonim; Zabudova Molodechno; Kommunalnik Slonim; Gomelzheldortrans; Livadiya Dzerzhinsk; Zvezda-BGU Minsk; Neman Mosty; Smolevichi; Zhlobin; Orsha; Osipovichi; Miory; Isloch Minsk Raion	Azot Grodno (Grodno Region); Gazovik Vitebsk (Vitebsk Region); Gomelsteklo Kostyukovka (Gomel Region); Gorki (Mogilev Region); MLF Minsk (Minsk); Pruzhany (Brest Region)

1. Four reserve teams (Dinamo-2 Minsk, Minsk-2, Vitebsk-2 and Dnepr-2 Mogilev) did not participate in this edition of the Cup.

== First round ==
32 teams started the competition in this round: 10 teams from the First League, 16 teams from Second League and 6 amateur clubs. 5 First League clubs that were at the top of league table at the moment of the draw (SKVICH Minsk, Bereza-2010, Gorodeya, Dnepr Mogilev and Granit Mikashevichi) and all 11 Premier League teams received a bye to the next round. Matches of this round will be played on 13 June 2012.

13 June 2012	Klechesk Kletsk (III)	2–4	Zhlobin (III)	Kletsk
13:00	Ustyan 75'; Avizhen 86'		Tokarsky 22', 63'; Rubanov 59'; Rakutov 84'	Stadium: City Stadium; Attendance: 50; Referee: Gennady Levchuk (Malorita)

13 June 2012	Pruzhany (A)	1–2	Vedrich-97 Rechitsa (II)	Pruzhany
17:00	Simonovich 56'		Lomako 10'; Lavrenchuk 64'	Stadium: Mukhavets Stadium; Attendance: 150; Referee: Dmitry Dolya (Grodno)

13 June 2012	Lida (II)	3–1	Belcard Grodno (III)	Lida
17:00	Dovgilevich 29'; Tatarnikov 39'; Dabravolski 90+5' (pen.)		Ravlushko 55'	Stadium: Yunost Stadium; Attendance: 200; Referee: Aleksandr Matusevich (Molodechno)

13 June 2012	Gazovik Vitebsk (A)	1–3	DSK Gomel (II)	Vitebsk
17:00	Pyatrow 72'		Klop 27'; Zubtsovsky 55'; Kurgheli 78'	Stadium: Vitebsky CSK; Attendance: 50; Referee: Valentin Bliznyuk (Minsk)

13 June 2012	Gorki (A)	1–4	Slutsk (II)	Mogilev
17:30	Maslenkovich 72'		Khamitsevich 7', 17'; Zabolotsky 23'; Makaraw 83'	Stadium: SDYuShOR-7 Stadium; Attendance: 50; Referee: Vladimir Ischenko (Rechitsa)

13 June 2012	Zabudova Molodechno (III)	1–4	Smorgon (II)	Molodechno
18:00	Makritsky 66'		Karolik 13'; Semenov 39'; Skshynetski 52'; Panasyuk 74' (pen.)	Stadium: City Stadium; Attendance: 300; Referee: Oleg Murashkevich (Novopolotsk)

13 June 2012	Livadiya Dzerzhinsk (III)	2–3	Beltransgaz Slonim (III)	Dzerzhinsk
18:00	Khodnevich 23', 90+2'		Zhegalo 77'; Golubev 90'; Kasinets 90+1'	Stadium: City Stadium; Attendance: 50; Referee: Yevgeny Moroz (Minsk)

13 June 2012	Baranovichi (III)	0–1 (a.e.t.)	Volna Pinsk (II)	Baranovichi
18:00			Kosmynin 116'	Stadium: Lokomotiv Stadium; Attendance: 300; Referee: Ivan Safaryan (Minsk)

13 June 2012	Gomelsteklo Kostyukovka (A)	1–3	Isloch Minsk Raion (III)	Kostykovka
18:00	Kudarenko 64'		Pustokhod 62'; Borodayenko 69'; Danilik 85'	Stadium: City Stadium; Attendance: 200; Referee: Andrey Divakov (Mogilev)

13 June 2012	Kommunalnik Slonim (III)	0–0 (a.e.t.) (3–5 p)	Polotsk (II)	Slonim
18:00				Stadium: Yunost Stadium; Attendance: 400; Referee: Sergey Stetsurin (Brest)
	Penalties
	Zhukov (penalty scored); Bazei (penalty missed); Matyuk (penalty scored); Fedorchuk (penalty scored)		(penalty scored) Zhuraw; (penalty scored) Gorokhovsky; (penalty scored) Khaladkow; (penalty scored) Markaw; (penalty scored) Mahal

13 June 2012	Azot Grodno (A)	0–5	Khimik Svetlogorsk (II)	Grodno
18:00			Kharitonchik 67'; Syrokvashko 73', 90+2'; Zhostkin 86'; Shukelovich 90+1' (pen.)	Stadium: Neman Stadium; Attendance: 100; Referee: Nikolay Kurilovich (Bereza)

13 June 2012	Osipovichi (III)	0–2	Zvezda-BGU Minsk (III)	Osipovichi
18:00			Lagutko 32'; Krina 65'	Stadium: Yunost Stadium; Attendance: 300; Referee: Mikhail Lavsky (Gomel)

13 June 2012	Orsha (III)	1–2	Rudensk (II)	Orsha
18:00	Kitayev 54' (pen.)		Fedaseyew 6'; Bogushevich 76'	Stadium: City Stadium; Attendance: 700; Referee: Dmitry Yevnevich (Minsk)

13 June 2012	Gomelzheldortrans (III)	3–1	Smolevichi (III)	Gomel
18:00	Chub 26'; Minenkov 76' (o.g.); Pyrkh 90+5'		Trapashko 42'	Stadium: SDYuSShOR-8 Stadium; Attendance: 60; Referee: Nikita Pyreyev (Minsk)

13 June 2012	Miory (III)	0–1	Neman Mosty (III)	Miory
18:00			Klimuk 21'	Stadium: Atlant Stadium; Attendance: 170; Referee: Dmitry Digilevich (Zhodino)

13 June 2012	MLF Minsk (A)	0–5	Vitebsk (II)	Minsk
18:30			Trachynski 11', 41'; Pakulin 29'; Dzegtseraw 55'; Shuhunkow 82'	Stadium: RCOP-BGU Stadium; Attendance: 50; Referee: Igor Kruk (Molodechno)

== Round of 32 ==
The winners from the First Round will play against 16 clubs that received a bye to this round. The draw was conducted on 14 June 2012.

19 July 2012	Smorgon (II)	1–3	Neman Grodno	Smorgon
18:00	Shota 74' (pen.)		Lyasyuk 25', 32'; Savitskiy 57'	Stadium: Yunost Stadium; Attendance: 1,000; Referee: Vadim Panchenko (Mogilev)

19 July 2012	Beltransgaz Slonim (III)	4–1	Granit Mikashevichi (II)	Slonim
18:00	Bokhno 25' (o.g.); Kevra 38'; Kasinets 47', 49'		Harnak 60'	Stadium: Yunost Stadium; Attendance: 1,000; Referee: Aleksandr Yevnevich (Minsk)

21 July 2012	Zvezda-BGU Minsk (III)	0–2	SKVICH Minsk (II)	Minsk
12:00			Markhel 40'; Shapyatowski 59'	Stadium: RCOP-BGU Stadium; Attendance: 150; Referee: Denis Scherbakov (Minsk)

21 July 2012	Lida (II)	0–2	Slavia Mozyr	Lida
17:00			Usachev 87'; Kazak 89'	Stadium: Yunost Stadium; Attendance: 1,200; Referee: Oleg Cherepnyov (Bobruisk)

21 July 2012	Zhlobin (III)	0–2	Belshina Bobruisk	Zhlobin
17:00			Bliznyuk 15' (pen.), 89'	Stadium: Lokomotiv Stadium; Attendance: 900; Referee: Dmitry Dmitriyev (Fanipol)

21 July 2012	Khimik Svetlogorsk (II)	0–2	Gorodeya (II)	Svetlogorsk
17:30			Martynets 13'; Chaley 58'	Stadium: Bumazhnik Stadium; Attendance: 500; Referee: Dmitry Yevnevich (Minsk)

21 July 2012	Slutsk (II)	1–2	Dnepr Mogilev (II)	Slutsk
18:00	Bobko 63'		Zyanko 73'; Shakaw 89'	Stadium: City Stadium; Attendance: 1,479; Referee: Valery Vyalichka (Minsk)

21 July 2012	Isloch Minsk Raion (III)	0–3	Minsk	Minsk
18:00			Vasilyuk 20' (pen.); Astravukh 55'; Makas 71'	Stadium: RCOP-BGU Stadium; Attendance: 500; Referee: Mikhail Lavsky (Gomel)

21 July 2012	Vitebsk (II)	1–2	Torpedo-BelAZ Zhodino	Vitebsk
18:00	Baranok 62'		Yatskevich 33'; Shchegrikovich 53'	Stadium: CSK Vitebsky; Attendance: 700; Referee: Sergey Tsinkevich (Osipovichi)

21 July 2012	Neman Mosty (III)	1–7	Brest	Mosty
	Leshanyuk 67'		Signevich 29'; Premudrov 44', 54'; Sokol 45+1'; Solovey 57', 64'; Gogoladze 86'	Stadium: Neman Stadium; Attendance: 600; Referee: Aleksandr Matusevich (Molodechno)

21 July 2012	DSK Gomel (II)	0–2	Bereza-2010 (II)	Gomel
18:00			Valavik 35'; Gerasimenko 37'	Stadium: SDYuSShOR-8 Stadium; Attendance: 95; Referee: Nikita Pyreyev (Minsk)

22 July 2012	Polotsk (II)	1–1 (a.e.t.) (6–7 p)	Gomel	Polotsk
18:00	Markaw 120+1'		Katlyaraw 96'	Stadium: Spartak Stadium; Attendance: 300; Referee: Vitaly Maslovskiy (Minsk)
	Penalties
	Zhuraw (penalty scored); Gorokhovsky (penalty scored); Khaladkow (penalty scored); Shupikov (penalty missed); Dekhtyar (penalty scored); Markaw (penalty scored); Kotovich (penalty scored); Maletsin (penalty missed)		(penalty missed) Yawseenka; (penalty scored) Tsyenchen; (penalty scored) Matsveychyk; (penalty scored) Yakhno; (penalty scored) Akhramenko; (penalty scored) Novik; (penalty scored) Fomin; (penalty scored) Tsimashenka

22 August 2012	Vedrich-97 Rechitsa (II)	0–1	Dinamo Minsk	Rechytsa
17:30			Plaskonny 78'	Stadium: Central Stadium; Attendance: 1,500; Referee: Dmitry Dmitriyev (Fanipol)

6 September 2012	Volna Pinsk (II)	0–0 (a.e.t.) (3–2 p)	Naftan Novopolotsk	Pinsk
18:00				Stadium: Volna Stadium; Attendance: 300; Referee: Aleksandr Matusevich (Molodechno)
	Penalties
	Kalpachuk (penalty scored); Taraschik (penalty scored); Rogovik (penalty missed); Narozhnik (penalty scored)		(penalty missed) Kovalenko; (penalty scored) Cernych; (penalty missed) Yakimov; (penalty scored) Harbachow; (penalty missed) Kobets

8 September 2012	Gomelzheldortrans (III)	0–1	Shakhtyor Soligorsk	Gomel
17:30			Tsevan 40'	Stadium: SDYuSShOR-8 Stadium; Attendance: 150; Referee: Nikita Pyreyev (Minsk)

9 September 2012	Rudensk (II)	0–4	BATE Borisov	Maryina Horka
16:00			Alyakhnovich 2'; Kontsevoy 34' (pen.), 40'; Vasilyuk 62'	Stadium: City Stadium; Attendance: 600; Referee: Andrey Soroka (Smolevichi)

== Round of 16 ==
The draw was conducted on 10 September 2012. The games are scheduled for 26 September 2012.

26 September 2012	Slavia Mozyr	1–5	Brest	Mozyr
15:00	Strakhanovich 39'		Papush 15'; Gogoladze 44'; Khvashchynski 61'; Premudrov 76'; Hayduchyk 86'	Stadium: Yunost Stadium; Attendance: 500; Referee: Oleg Cherepnyov (Bobruisk)

26 September 2012	Dinamo Minsk	5–0	Volna Pinsk (II)	Minsk
15:00	Rassadkin 14'; Danilaw 25'; Bykov 60'; Kibuk 67', 79'			Stadium: Dinamo-Yuni Stadium; Attendance: 1,100; Referee: Andrey Soroka (Smolevichi)

26 September 2012	Belshina Bobruisk	1–0	Bereza-2010 (II)	Bobruisk
15:00	Kowb 65'			Stadium: Spartak Stadium; Attendance: 400; Referee: Aleksei Kulbakov (Gomel)

26 September 2012	Dnepr Mogilev (II)	1–2	SKVICH Minsk (II)	Mogilev
18:00	Sļesarčuks 43' (pen.)		Volodko 13'; Markhel 27'	Stadium: Spartak Stadium; Attendance: 1,400; Referee: Aleksandr Matusevich (Molodechno)

26 September 2012	Shakhtyor Soligorsk	3–0	Beltransgaz Slonim (III)	Soligorsk
18:30	Yanush 26', 74'; Asipenka 90'			Stadium: Stroitel Stadium; Attendance: 800; Referee: Dmitry Yevnevich (Minsk)

11 October 2012	Gorodeya (II)	0–2	Minsk	Gorodeya
15:00			Razin 30'; Rozhok 62'	Stadium: Gorodeya Stadium; Attendance: 200; Referee: Sergey Tsinkevich (Osipovichi)

13 October 2012	BATE Borisov	0–1	Torpedo-BelAZ Zhodino	Borisov
17:00			Yatskevich 55'	Stadium: City Stadium; Attendance: 4,070; Referee: Oleg Cherepnyov (Bobruisk)

21 November 2012	Neman Grodno	1–1 (a.e.t.) (4–5 p)	Gomel	Grodno
19:00	Vitus 56'		Kashewski 66'	Stadium: Neman Stadium; Attendance: 2,200; Referee: Andrey Soroka (Smolevichi)
	Penalties
	Rawneyka (penalty missed); Savitskiy (penalty scored); Vitus (penalty scored); Veselinov (penalty scored); Savastsyanaw (penalty scored); Kryvobok (penalty missed)		(penalty scored) Kashewski; (penalty scored) Kirylchyk; (penalty scored) Platonaw; (penalty scored) Kazeka; (penalty missed) Sherakow; (penalty scored) Voronkov

== Quarterfinals ==
An open draw for quarterfinals was conducted on 22 November 2012. The matches will be played on 16 and 17 March 2013.

16 March 2013	Dinamo Minsk	0–0 (a.e.t.) (4–2 p)	Shakhtyor Soligorsk	Minsk
17:00				Stadium: Football Manege; Attendance: 1,600; Referee: Sergey Tsinkevich (Osipovichi)
	Penalties
	Figueredo (penalty scored); Bykov (penalty scored); Stasevich (penalty scored); Simović (penalty scored)		(penalty missed) Ryas; (penalty missed) Kashewski; (penalty scored) Lyavonchyk; (penalty scored) Asipenka

16 March 2013	Belshina Bobruisk	1–4	Torpedo-BelAZ Zhodino	Minsk
20:25	Gordeichuk 68'		Chelyadinsky 46'; D. Platonaw 56', 58'; Lyavitski 74'	Stadium: Football Manege; Attendance: 800; Referee: Mikhail Lavsky (Gomel)

17 March 2013	SKVICH Minsk (II)	1–0 (a.e.t.)	Brest	Minsk
12:00	Margolenko 94'			Stadium: Football Manege; Attendance: 800; Referee: Igor Kruk (Molodechno)

17 March 2013	Minsk	3–2	Gomel	Minsk
19:30	Vasilyuk 72' (pen.); Wojciechowski 77'; Rozhok 90+4'		Matsveenka 31', 66'	Stadium: Football Manege; Attendance: 1,700; Referee: Vitaly Sevostyanik (Grodno)

== Semifinals ==
An open draw for semifinals was conducted on 18 March 2013. The matches were played on 3 April 2013.

3 April 2013	Minsk	1–0	Torpedo-BelAZ Zhodino	Minsk
15:00	Razin 90+3'			Stadium: KFP Minsk; Attendance: 1,500; Referee: Sergey Tsinkevich (Osipovichi)

3 April 2013	Dinamo Minsk	5–0	SKVICH Minsk (II)	Minsk
18:30	Curelea 28'; Figueredo 32', 72'; Sychev 79'; Bykov 82'			Stadium: KFP Minsk; Attendance: 1,700; Referee: Mikhail Lavsky (Gomel)

== Final ==
26 May 2013
17:00 UTC+3

Dinamo Minsk	1–1 (a.e.t.)	Minsk
Figueredo 36' (pen.)	Report	Sosnovski 33'
Penalties
Figueredo (penalty missed); Bykov (penalty missed); Stasevich (penalty scored)	1–4	(penalty scored) Rozhok; (penalty scored) Bukatkin; (penalty scored) Sachywka; (penalty scored) Kibuk

Torpedo Stadium, Zhodino
Attendance: 6,000
Referee: Igor Kruk (Molodechno)

DINAMO:
GK	30	(Belarus) Alyaksandr Hutar
RB	20	(Belarus) Aleh Veratsila (c)
CB	3	(Belarus) Pavel Plaskonny
CB	6	(Belarus) Syarhey Palitsevich
LB	85	(Belarus) Vitali Trubila	(yellow card) 101'
DM	4	(Serbia) Slobodan Simović
DM	17	(Belarus) Artem Bykov
RM	22	(Belarus) Ihar Stasevich
CM	21	(Uruguay) Hernán Figueredo
LM	19	(Belarus) Alyaksandr Danilaw		(substituted off) 82'
FW	11	(Romania) Costin Curelea	(yellow card) 67'	(substituted off) 97'
Substitutes:
GK	1	(Belarus) Alyaksandr Sulima
DF	7	(Belarus) Alyaksandr Bychanok		(substituted on) 82'
FW	9	(Belarus) Uladzimir Khvashchynski
MF	14	(Bosnia and Herzegovina) Adnan Zahirović
MF	18	(Belarus) Nikita Korzun
FW	23	(Uruguay) Danilo Cóccaro		(substituted on) 97'
DF	25	(Belarus) Ihar Kuzmyanok
Manager:
(Ukraine) Oleh Protasov

MINSK:
GK	1	(Belarus) Uladzimir Bushma
RB	2	(Belarus) Roman Begunov	(yellow card) 15'
CB	3	(Belarus) Sergey Sosnovski
CB	11	(Belarus) Alyaksandr Sachywka
LB	27	(Serbia) Miloš Rnić	(yellow card) 6'
DM	88	(Belarus) Mikita Bukatkin	(yellow card) 110'
DM	7	(Belarus) Syarhey Kazeka	(yellow card) 65'
RM	6	(Belarus) Andrey Razin (c)		(substituted off) 54'
CM	10	(Belarus) Raman Vasilyuk
LM	9	(Belarus) Sergey Pushnyakov		(substituted off) 90+4'
FW	19	(Belarus) Roman Volkov		(substituted off) 69'
Substitutes:
GK	30	(Belarus) Denis Dechko
DF	4	(Belarus) Aleksandr Sverchinskiy
DF	5	(Belarus) Yury Astravukh
MF	8	(Belarus) Syarhey Hihevich		(substituted on) 69'
MF	23	(Belarus) Artsyom Buloychyk
MF	29	(Ukraine) Serhiy Rozhok		(substituted on) 90+4'
MF	77	(Belarus) Vital Kibuk		(substituted on) 54'
Manager:
(Belarus) Vadim Skripchenko

== See also ==
- 2012 Belarusian Premier League
- 2013 Belarusian Premier League
- 2012 Belarusian First League
