= 2020 FC BATE Borisov season =

FC BATE Borisov
2020 season
- Chairman: Kapski Andrei
- Manager: Kirill Alshevsky
- Stadium: Borisov Arena
- Premier League: 2nd
- 2019–20 Belarusian Cup: Winners
- 2020–21 Belarusian Cup: Round of 16
- Europa League: Second qualifying round
- Top goalscorer: League: Maksim Skavysh (17); All: Maksim Skavysh (19)
- Highest home attendance: 7,113 (14 March 2020)
- Lowest home attendance: 470 (4 April 2020)
- Average home league attendance: 2,745
- Biggest win: Minsk 0–3 BATE (12 April 2020)
- Biggest defeat: Energetik-BGU 3–1 BATE (19 March 2020)
Home colours	Away colours

The 2020 FC BATE Borisov season was the club's 33rd season of existence and their 23rd consecutive season in the Belarusian Premier League. BATE Borisov entered the season as the league's 10-time defending champions. Beyond the Premier League, BATE Borisov is participating in the UEFA Europa League and the Belarusian Cup. Competitive fixtures began on 9 March 2020, and the league began play on 19 March 2020.

The club's season has been highlighted by the fact that the Belarus Premier League was the only top-flight football league in UEFA to not suspend play during the COVID-19 pandemic. Worldwide, the Belarusian Premier League was one of only three top-tier football leagues, along with Nicaragua and Tajikistan, that continued play through the pandemic. Part of this has been attributed to the nation's relatively low number of positive coronavirus cases in Belarus.

== Previous season ==
The 2019 season was the first year since 2005 where BATE failed to win the Premier League title. Following the 2019 season, head manager, Alyaksey Baha was relieved of his duties. Ahead of the 2020 season, Kirill Alshevsky, the manager of BATE Reserves, was appointed manager.

BATE finished the 2019 season with a 22–4–4 record in league play. BATE was eliminated in the quarterfinals of the 2018–19 Belarusian Cup. BATE continued their participation in the 2018–19 UEFA Europa League knockout phase, where they were pitted against English outfit, and eventual runners-up, Arsenal. BATE won the home leg 1–0, but lost away 0–3, ending their Europa League participation. During the late summer, BATE resumed European competition play by entering in the second qualifying round of the 2019–20 UEFA Champions League. BATE were eliminated by Norwegian side, Rosenborg in the second round, transferring to the 2019–20 UEFA Europa League's third qualifying round. BATE advanced to the play-off round after defeating Bosnian side, Sarajevo, but lost to Kazakh side, FC Astana, thus ending their European participation for the 2019 season.

Since BATE finished in 2nd last season the Premier League, they will enter in the qualifying rounds of the 2020–21 UEFA Europa League, which is slated to begin for them in July.

== Non-competitive fixtures ==
1 February 2020	Zlín (Czech Republic)	0–0	(Belarus) BATE	Belek, Turkey
12:00 FET		Report		Stadium: Cornelia Sportcomplex Pitch 1

7 February 2020	BATE (Belarus)	0–1	(Czech Republic) Příbram	Belek, Turkey
06:00 FET		Report		Stadium: Cornelia Sportcomplex Pitch 1

7 February 2020	BATE (Belarus)	1–1	(Russia) Sochi	Belek, Turkey
12:00 FET		Report		Stadium: Cornelia Sportcomplex Pitch 2

11 February 2020	Dynamo Kyiv (Ukraine)	1–1	(Belarus) BATE	Belek, Turkey
12:00 FET		Report		Stadium: Cornelia Sportcomplex Pitch 1

23 February 2020	Zhetysu (Kazakhstan)	3–1	(Belarus) BATE	Belek, Turkey
12:00 FET		Report		Stadium: Cornelia Sportcomplex Pitch 2

28 February 2020	BATE (Belarus)	2–1	(Kazakhstan) Aktobe	Belek, Turkey
08:00 FET		Report		Stadium: Cornelia Sportcomplex Pitch 1

28 February 2020	BATE (Belarus)	1–0	(Ukraine) Rukh Lviv	Belek, Turkey
08:00 FET		Report		Stadium: Cornelia Sportcomplex Pitch 3

== Competitive fixtures ==
=== Belarusian Premier League ===
==== Table ====
Pos	Team	Pld	W	D	L	GF	GA	GD	Pts	Qualification or relegation
1	Shakhtyor Soligorsk (C)	30	17	8	5	57	21	+36	59	Qualification for the Champions League first qualifying round
2	BATE Borisov	30	17	7	6	65	32	+33	58	Qualification for the Europa Conference League second qualifying round
3	Torpedo-BelAZ Zhodino	30	16	8	6	55	37	+18	56	Qualification for the Europa Conference League second qualifying round
4	Dynamo Brest	30	17	3	10	63	40	+23	54	Qualification for the Europa Conference League second qualifying round
5	Neman Grodno	30	16	5	9	41	29	+12	53	

Source: football.by
Rules for classification: 1) Points; 2) Head-to-head points; 3) Head-to-head goal difference; 4) Head-to-head goals scored; 5) Goal difference; 6) Matches won; 7) Goals scored.
(C) Champions

==== Results ====
19 March 2020 1	Energetik-BGU	3–1	BATE	Minsk
13:00 FET	Atemengue (yellow card) 19'; Yakhshiboev 26', 34'; Musahagian (yellow card) 36'; Bakić 88' (yellow card) 90+1'	Report	Drahun (yellow card) 33'; Skavysh 66'; Volkov (yellow card) 85'	Stadium: RCOR-BGU Stadium; Attendance: 730; Referee: Dmitry Dolya

28 March 2020 2	Slavia Mozyr	2–1	BATE	Mazyr
11:00 FET	Melnikov 32', 48' (yellow card) 68'; Chukhley (yellow card) 37'; Raewski (yellow card) 51'; Zhuk (yellow card) 65'	Report	Willumsson 10'; Baga (yellow card) 62'; Nyakhaychyk (yellow card) 66'; Filipović (yellow card) 78'	Stadium: Yunost Stadium; Attendance: 2,150; Referee: Sergey Stetsurin

4 April 2020 3	BATE	1–0	Rukh Brest	Borisov
13:30 FET	Drahun 7'; Filipović (yellow card) 27'; Milić (yellow card) 44'; Willumsson (yellow card) 59'; Stasevich (yellow card) 83'	Report	Vasiliev (yellow card) 23'; Pyatrenka (yellow card) 35'; Osuchukwu (yellow card) 40'; Grechiko (yellow card) 43'	Stadium: Borisov Arena; Attendance: 470; Referee: Denis Shcherbakov

12 April 2020 4	Minsk	0–3	BATE	Minsk
11:00 FET	Zinovich (yellow card) 68'	Report	Drahun 26'; Saroka 35'; Nyakhaychyk 62'	Stadium: FC Minsk Stadium; Attendance: 474; Referee: Amin Kurgkheli

18 April 2020 5	BATE	0–0	Torpedo-BelAZ Zhodino	Borisov
16:00 FET		Report	Afanasyev (yellow card) 40'; Yashin (yellow card) 41'; Ustinov (yellow card) 74'	Stadium: Borisov Arena; Attendance: 652; Referee: Sergey Stetsurin

25 April 2020 6	Gorodeya	0–2	BATE	Haradzeya
13:00 FET	Sazonovich (yellow card) 21'; Arkhipov (yellow card) 60'	Report	Milić (yellow card) 37'; Nastić (yellow card) 66'; Volkov (yellow card) 68'; Drahun 73'; Saroka 90+3'	Stadium: Gorodeya Stadium; Attendance: 284; Referee: Dimitry Dolya

3 May 2020 7	BATE	3–1	Neman Grodno	Borisov
11:00 FET	Dubajić 12' (yellow card) 21'; Stasevich 17' (pen.); Nyakhaychyk 70'	Report	Zabelin (yellow card) 23'; Kadymyan 31'; Koval (yellow card) 62'; Leshko (yellow card) 72'	Stadium: Borisov Arena; Attendance: 1,000; Referee: Denis Shcherbakov

10 May 2020 8	Smolevichi	3–5	BATE	Smolevichi
11:00 FET	Barsukow 1'; Butarevich (yellow card) 20'; Zhevnerov (yellow card) 39'; Turik (yellow card) 40'; Poé (yellow card) 52' (goal) 63'; Shchagrykovich 55'	Report	Skavysh 13'; Stasevich 15'; Nastić (yellow card) 22'; Baha 36'; Drahun (yellow card) 56'; Nyakhaychyk (yellow card) 69'; Milić 80', 90+3'	Stadium: Ozyorny Stadium; Attendance: 2,915; Referee: Andrey Vasilevich

16 May 2020 9	BATE	3–0	Slutsk	Borisov
12:00 FET		Report		Stadium: Borisov Arena; Attendance: 1,157; Referee: Sergey Stetsurin

20 May 2020 10	Dynamo Brest	1–3	BATE	Brest
13:45 FET	Kislyak (yellow card) 4'; Noyok (yellow card) 36'; Milevskyi 40'; Pavlovets (yellow card) 47'; Savitski (yellow card) 54'; Laptsew (yellow card) 90+3'	Report	Drahun 31'; Filipenko (yellow card) 38'; Skavysh (yellow card) 55'; Nyakhaychyk 73'; Milić 80'	Stadium: Regional Sport Complex Brestsky; Attendance: 4,320; Referee: (Belarus) Aleksei Kulbakov
Note: Rescheduled from 24 May 2020 due to the Belarusian Cup Final

31 May 2020 11	BATE	1–0	Isloch	Borisov
11:00 FET	Milić 39' (pen.)	Summary	Kantsavy (yellow card) 39'; Yansane (yellow card) 58' (yellow-red card) 61'; Yanushkevich (red card) 90+5'	Stadium: Borisov Arena; Attendance: 1,563; Referee: (Belarus) Denis Scherbakov

7 June 2020 12	Vitebsk	2–2	BATE	Vitebsk
9:00 FET	Júlio César (yellow card) 12'; Diego Carioca (yellow card) 59'; Volkaw 79'; Ksenofontov 90'	Summary	Nyakhaychyk 14'; Drahun 58'; Yablonskiy (yellow card) 62'	Stadium: Vitebsky Central Sport Complex; Attendance: 2,720; Referee: (Belarus) Amin Kurgheli

14 June 2020 13	BATE	2–2	Shakhtyor Soligorsk	Borisov
14:00 FET	Nyakhaychyk (yellow card) 28' (goal) 61'; Stasevich (yellow card) 54'; Yablonskiy (yellow card) 54'; Skavysh 78'; Chichkan (yellow card) 81'	Summary	Ivanović 8' (yellow card) 84'; Selyava (yellow card) 67'; Padstrelaw 81'; Sachywka (yellow card) 90+1'	Stadium: Borisov Arena; Attendance: 2,452; Referee: (Belarus) Vitaly Sevostyanik

21 June 2020 14	Belshina Bobruisk	0–2	BATE	Bobruisk
9:00 FET	Rekish (yellow card) 58'; Salimov (yellow card) 76'	Summary	Stasevich 27'; Nastić (yellow card) 67'; Yablonskiy (yellow card) 77'; Nyakhaychyk (yellow card) 80' (goal) 83'	Stadium: Spartak Stadium; Referee: (Belarus) Sergey Stetsurin

27 June 2020 15	BATE	0–2	Dinamo Minsk	Borisov
13:00 FET	Stasevich (yellow card) 53'; Bessmertny (yellow card) 60'; Milić (yellow card) 65'	Summary	Goropevšek (yellow card) 23'; Shikavka 64'; Kazlow 66' (yellow card) 69'; Sukhotskyi (yellow card) 85'; Vyarheychyk (yellow card) 87'	Stadium: Borisov Arena; Attendance: 4,280; Referee: (Belarus) Andrey Vasilevich

4 July 2020 16	BATE	0–1	Energetik-BGU	Borisov
13:00 FET	Nastić (yellow card) 39'	Summary	Svirepa (yellow card) 7' (yellow-red card) 20'; Umarov 23'; Tweh (yellow card) 28'	Stadium: Borisov Arena; Attendance: 2,549; Referee: (Belarus) Amin Kurgheli

11 July 2020 17	BATE	1–1	Slavia Mozyr	Borisov
18:30 FET	Yablonskiy (yellow card) 40'; Stasevich (yellow card) 43'; Volkov (yellow card) 55'; Nyakhaychyk (yellow card) 61'; Baranovsky 74' (o.g.)	Summary	Pavlyuchek (yellow card) 36'; Narh (yellow card) 54'; Chukhley 76' (pen.); Baranovsky (yellow card) 86'; Rayewski (yellow card) 88'	Stadium: Borisov Arena; Attendance: 2,507; Referee: (Belarus) Sergey Stetsurin

18 July 2020 18	Rukh Brest	0–3	BATE	Brest
20:30 FET	Grechikho (yellow card) 18'; Mihunov (yellow card) 60'	Summary	Nastić 6'; Nyakhaychyk 20'; Filipović (yellow card) 27'; Skavysh 44'	Stadium: Yunost Stadium; Attendance: 2,150; Referee: (Belarus) Amin Kurgheli

26 July 2020 19	BATE	6–0	Minsk	Borisov
18:45 FET	Skavysh 5' 61' (yellow card) 71'; Stasevich (yellow card) 16' (goal) 45'; Baha 59'; Drahun 77'; Yablonskiy 90+2'	Summary	Zinovich (yellow card) 27'; Zaleski (yellow card) 76'; Yevgeniy Malashevich (yellow card) 90+1'	Stadium: Borisov Arena; Attendance: 3,011; Referee: (Belarus) Sergey Krasnikov

2 August 2020 20	Torpedo-BelAZ Zhodino	3–2	BATE	Zhodzina
16:00 FET	Khachaturyan 45' (yellow card) 90+1'; Gabriel Ramos 59'; Antilevskiy 60'; Pavlyukovets (yellow card) 81'; Nikolayevich (yellow card) 90'	Summary	Skavysh 8'; Stasevich 36' (yellow card) 69'; Baha (yellow card) 73'; Milić (yellow card) 77'	Stadium: Torpedo Stadium; Attendance: 3,640; Referee: (Belarus) Sergey Stetsurin

8 August 2020 21	BATE	1–0	FC Gorodeya	Borisov
20:00 FET	Skavysh 1'	Summary	Valavik (yellow card) 33'; Kozel (yellow card) 42'	Stadium: Borisov Arena; Attendance: 4,100; Referee: (Belarus) Anton Lashuk

23 August 2020 22	Neman Grodno	0–2	BATE	Grodno
20:00 FET	Vasilyev (yellow card) 88'	Summary	Skavysh 42'; Nyakhaychyk 54'	Stadium: Neman Stadium; Attendance: 0 (closed door); Referee: (Belarus) Denis Scherbakov

12 September 2020 23	BATE	5–2	Smolevichi	Borisov
16:00 FET	Volodko (yellow card) 15'; Willumsson 39', 60'; Skavysh 42', 80'; Filipović 76'	Report	Dzhigero 51'; Khalimonchik (yellow card) 54'; Zhevnerov (red card) 74'; Khankevich 85'	Stadium: Borisov Arena; Attendance: 0 (closed door); Referee: (Belarus) Anton Lashuk

20 September 2020 24	Slutsk	1–3	BATE	Slutsk
13:00 FET	Semenov 24'; Velko (yellow card) 55'; Gafar (yellow card) 59'	Report	Skavysh 39', 73'; Filipenko 43'; Moukam (yellow card) 56'; Filipović (yellow card) 77'; Scherbitskiy (yellow card) 77'	Stadium: City Stadium; Attendance: 0 Referee: (Belarus) Vital Sevostsjyanik

27 September 2020 25	BATE	2–4	Dynamo Brest	Borisov
13:00 FET	Nyakhaychyk 70'; Milić 79'; Filipović (yellow card) 84'	Report	Sedko 5'; Yuzepchuk (yellow card) 45'; Savitski 49'; Bykov (yellow card) 78'; Kislyak (yellow card) 80'; Krivets 90+1', 90+4'; Ignatovich (yellow card) 90+3'	Stadium: Borisov Arena; Attendance: 0 Referee: (Belarus) Amin Kurgkheli

18 October 2020 26	Isloch	2–2	BATE	Minsk
09:00 FET	Makas 19'; Kuzmenok 69'; Stephen (yellow card) 79'	Report	Skavysh 25', 51'; Dragun (yellow card) 79'	Stadium: FC Minsk Stadium; Attendance: 310; Referee: Sergey Chistov

24 October 2020 27	BATE	3–1	Vitebsk	Borisov
10:30 FET	Willumson (yellow card) 32'; Skavysh 43', 63'; Milić 83'	Report	Chalov 68'; Matveenko (yellow card) 79'	Stadium: Borisov Arena; Attendance: 1,509; Referee: Sergey Stetsurin

7 November 2020 28	Soligorsk	1–1	BATE	Soligorsk
12:00 FET	Khadarkevich (yellow card) 57'; Yakhshibaev (yellow card) 69'; Begunov 81' (pen.)	Report	Nyakhaychyk 25'; Dragun (yellow card) 30'; Skavysh (yellow card) 81'	Stadium: Stroitel Stadium; Attendance: 1,670; Referee: Sergey Stetsurin

22 November 2020 29	BATE	5–0	Belshina	Borisov
14:00 FET	Moukam 39'; Skavysh 56' (pen.), 57'; Nyakhaychyk 73'; Milić (yellow card) 90+1'	Report	Levitskiy (yellow card) 30'; Lebedev (yellow card) 68'	Stadium: Borisov Arena; Attendance: 1,102; Referee: Dmitri Dolya

28 November 2020 30	Dinamo Minsk	0–0	BATE	Minsk
14:00 FET	Shikavka (penalty missed); Shitov (yellow card) 41'; Matveychik (yellow card) 78'	Report	Filipović (yellow card) 24'; Stasevich (yellow card) 43'; Filipenko (yellow card) 64'	Stadium: Dinamo Stadium; Attendance: 0 Referee: Sergey Stetsurin

=== Belarusian Cup (2019–20) ===
==== Quarterfinals ====
9 March 2020 First leg	Dinamo Minsk	1–2	BATE	Minsk
20:00 FET	Alyakhnovich 35'	Report	Skavysh 43'; Nyakhaychyk 63'	Stadium: Dinamo Stadium; Attendance: 9,805; Referee: Sergey Tsinkevich (Osipovichi)

14 March 2020 Second leg	BATE	3–2 (5–3 agg.)	Dinamo Minsk	Borisov
18:30 FET	Baha 21'; Filipenko 45+1'; Skavysh 84'	Report	Rios 10', 43'	Stadium: Borisov Arena; Attendance: 7,113; Referee: Amin Kurgheli (Gomel)

==== Semifinals ====
8 April 2020 First leg	Slavia Mozyr	1–0	BATE	Mozyr
17:30 FET	Pantya 11'	Report		Stadium: Yunost Stadium; Attendance: 1,350; Referee: Vitaly Sevostyanik (Grodno)

29 April 2020 Second leg	BATE	2–0 (2–1 agg.)	Slavia Mozyr	Borisov
13:00 FET	Volkov 12' (yellow card) 90+2'; Tymonyuk 45' (o.g.); Nyakhaychyk (yellow card) 55'; Nastić (yellow card) 56'; Yablonskiy (yellow card) 80'	Report	Melnikov (yellow card) 72'; Kavalewski (yellow card) 82'; Narh (yellow card) 87'	Stadium: Borisov Arena; Attendance: 671; Referee: Sergey Stetsurin

=== Final ===
24 May 2020	BATE	1–0 (a.e.t.)	Dinamo Brest	Minsk
	Volkov 120+1'			Stadium: Dinamo Stadium; Attendance: 5,700; Referee: Amin Kurgheli (Gomel)

=== Belarusian Cup (2020–21) ===
29 August 2020 Round of 32	Granit Mikashevichi	0–5	BATE	Luninets
17:00 FET (UTC+3)		Report	Moukam 11'; Myakish (yellow card) 47'; Bessmertny 49'; Willumsson 53'; Kopitović 67'; Maksim Gaevoy 90+1'	Stadium: Polesye Stadium; Referee: (Belarus) Dmitriy Dolya

5 December 2020 Round of 16	BATE	4–2	Dynamo Brest	Barysaw
18:45 FET (UTC+3)		Report		Stadium: Borisov Arena

=== UEFA Europa League ===
==== Qualifying rounds ====
17 September 2020 Second qualifying round	CSKA Sofia (Bulgaria)	2–0	(Belarus) BATE	Sofia, Bulgaria
20:00 EEST	Busatto (yellow card) 32'; Sowe 44'; Carey 90+5'	Report	Yablonskiy (yellow card) 46'; Filipović (yellow card) 63'; Dubajić (yellow card) 90+4'	Stadium: Stadion Balgarska Armia; Attendance: 0 (closed door); Referee: (Romania) Horațiu Feșnic
Note: Although the Bulgarian authorities allow spectators on open-door sports events, the game will be played behind closed doors as per UEFA regulations.

== Squad ==
As of March 2020

Note: Flags indicate national team as defined under FIFA eligibility rules; some limited exceptions apply. Players may hold more than one non-FIFA nationality.

No.	Pos.	Nation	Player
3	DF	BIH	Bojan Nastić
4	DF	SRB	Aleksandar Filipović
5	MF	BLR	Yevgeniy Yablonskiy
7	MF	BLR	Yevgeniy Berezkin
8	MF	BLR	Stanislaw Drahun
9	FW	SRB	Bojan Dubajić
11	FW	BLR	Anton Saroka
14	DF	MNE	Boris Kopitović
15	FW	BLR	Maksim Skavysh
16	GK	BLR	Andrey Kudravets
18	MF	ISL	Willum Þór Willumsson
19	MF	BLR	Dmitriy Bessmertny

No.	Pos.	Nation	Player
21	DF	BLR	Egor Filipenko
22	MF	BLR	Ihar Stasevich
23	DF	BLR	Zakhar Volkov
25	MF	BLR	Dzmitry Baha
26	FW	SRB	Nemanja Milić
32	DF	CRO	Jakov Filipovic
33	MF	BLR	Pavel Nyakhaychyk
35	GK	BLR	Anton Chichkan
43	MF	BLR	Aleksandr Nemirko
48	GK	BLR	Denis Scherbitskiy
88	MF	BLR	Alyaksandr Valadzko
94	MF	FRA	Hervaine Moukam

== Transfers ==
=== Transfers in ===
Date	Position	No.	Name	From	Fee	Ref.
1 January 2020	MF	8	(Belarus) Alyaksandr Valadzko	(Belarus) Shakhtyor Soligorsk	Undisclosed	
1 January 2020	DF	32	(Croatia) Jakov Filipović	(Belgium) Lokeren	Undisclosed	
1 January 2020	MF	33	(Belarus) Pavel Nyakhaychyk	(Belarus) Dynamo Brest	Undisclosed	

=== Transfers out ===
Date	Position	No.	Name	To	Fee	Team	Ref.

=== Loan out ===
Date	Loan ends	Position	No.	Name	To	Team	Ref.
1 January 2020	31 December 2020	MF	43	(Belarus) Aleksandr Nemirko	(Belarus) Dnepr Mogilev	Academy	

== Statistics ==
=== Appearances and goals ===
As of 17 May 2020

No.	Pos	Nat	Player	Total		Premier League		Belarusian Cup		Europa League	
No.	Pos	Nat	Player	Apps	Goals	Apps	Goals	Apps	Goals	Apps	Goals
3	DF	(Bosnia and Herzegovina) BIH	Bojan Nastić	0	0	0	0	0	0	0	0
4	DF	(Belarus) BLR	Aleksandar Filipović	0	0	0	0	0	0	0	0
5	MF	(Belarus) BLR	Yevgeniy Yablonskiy	0	0	0	0	0	0	0	0
7	MF	(Belarus) BLR	Yevgeniy Berezkin	0	0	0	0	0	0	0	0
8	MF	(Belarus) BLR	Stanislaw Drahun	0	0	0	0	0	0	0	0
9	FW	(Serbia) SRB	Bojan Dubajić	0	0	0	0	0	0	0	0
11	FW	(Belarus) BLR	Anton Saroka	0	0	0	0	0	0	0	0
14	DF	(Montenegro) MNE	Boris Kopitović	0	0	0	0	0	0	0	0
15	FW	(Belarus) BLR	Maksim Skavysh	0	0	0	0	0	0	0	0
16	GK	(Belarus) BLR	Andrey Kudravets	0	0	0	0	0	0	0	0
18	MF	(Iceland) ISL	Willum Þór Willumsson	0	0	0	0	0	0	0	0
19	MF	(Belarus) BLR	Dmitriy Bessmertny	0	0	0	0	0	0	0	0
21	DF	(Belarus) BLR	Egor Filipenko	0	0	0	0	0	0	0	0
22	MF	(Belarus) BLR	Ihar Stasevich	0	0	0	0	0	0	0	0
23	DF	(Belarus) BLR	Zakhar Volkov	0	0	0	0	0	0	0	0
25	MF	(Belarus) BLR	Dzmitry Baha	0	0	0	0	0	0	0	0
26	FW	(Serbia) SRB	Nemanja Milić	0	0	0	0	0	0	0	0
32	DF	(Croatia) CRO	Jakov Filipovic	0	0	0	0	0	0	0	0
33	MF	(Belarus) BLR	Pavel Nyakhaychyk	0	0	0	0	0	0	0	0
35	GK	(Belarus) BLR	Anton Chichkan	0	0	0	0	0	0	0	0
48	GK	(Belarus) BLR	Denis Scherbitskiy	0	0	0	0	0	0	0	0
88	MF	(Belarus) BLR	Alyaksandr Valadzko	0	0	0	0	0	0	0	0
94	MF	(France) FRA	Hervaine Moukam	0	0	0	0	0	0	0	0
Players away from BATE on loan:
43	MF	(Belarus) BLR	Aleksandr Nemirko	0	0	0	0	0	0	0	0

=== Goal-scorers ===
Place	Position	Nation	Number	Name	Premier League	Belarusian Cup	Europa League	Total
				TOTALS	4	0	0	4
