= 2014 Belarusian Super Cup =

BATE Borisov	Minsk
1	0
- Date: 15 March 2014
- Venue: Football Manege, Minsk
- Referee: Sergey Tsinkevich
- Attendance: 1,650

The 2014 Belarusian Super Cup was held on 15 March 2014 between the 2013 Belarusian Premier League champions winners BATE Borisov and the 2012–13 Belarusian Cup winners Minsk. BATE won the match 1–0, defending their title from the previous edition and winning the trophy for the fourth time.

== Match details ==
15 March 2014
16:00 UTC+3

BATE Borisov	1 – 0	Minsk
Mladenović 20'	Report

Football Manege, Minsk
Attendance: 1,650
Referee: Sergey Tsinkevich (Osipovichi)

BATE:
GK	35	(Latvia) Germans Māliņš
DF	33	(Belarus) Dzyanis Palyakow
DF	21	(Belarus) Egor Filipenko
DF	23	(Belarus) Edhar Alyakhnovich
DF	22	(Serbia) Filip Mladenović
MF	8	(Belarus) Alyaksandr Valadzko
MF	9	(Belarus) Illya Aleksiyevich		(substituted off) 56'
MF	25	(Belarus) Dzmitry Baha	(yellow card) 24'	(substituted off) 80'
MF	17	(Belarus) Alyaksandr Pawlaw		(substituted off) 88'
MF	10	(Belarus) Sergey Krivets		(substituted off) 77'
FW	20	(Belarus) Vitali Rodionov (c)
Substitutes:
GK	34	(Belarus) Artem Soroko
MF	2	(Belarus) Dzmitry Likhtarovich		(substituted on) 56'
DF	3	(Belarus) Vital Hayduchyk
MF	7	(Belarus) Aleksandr Karnitsky		(substituted on) 77'
FW	13	(Belarus) Nikolay Signevich	(yellow card) 90+3'	(substituted on) 88'
DF	14	(Russia) Anri Khagush
MF	42	(Belarus) Maksim Volodko		(substituted on) 70'
Manager:
(Belarus) Alyaksandr Yermakovich

MINSK:
GK	1	(Belarus) Uladzimir Bushma
DF	2	(Belarus) Roman Begunov
DF	11	(Belarus) Alyaksandr Sachywka (c)
DF	17	(Belarus) Dmitry Lentsevich
DF	3	(Serbia) Miloš Rnić
MF	20	(Belarus) Ivan Maewski
MF	77	(Ukraine) Dmytro Korkishko
MF	8	(North Macedonia) Predrag Ranđelović	(yellow card) 22'
MF	9	(Belarus) Sergey Pushnyakov		(substituted off) 76'
MF	5	(Belarus) Yury Astravukh		(substituted off) 68'
FW	13	(Belarus) Alyaksandr Makas		(substituted off) 82'
Substitutes:
GK	30	(Belarus) Denis Dechko
DF	4	(Belarus) Aleksandr Sverchinskiy
MF	7	(Belarus) Vital Kibuk		(substituted on) 68'
MF	15	(Belarus) Ihar Makaraw		(substituted on) 82'
MF	16	(Belarus) Igor Shumilov
FW	22	(Ukraine) Valeriy Kutsenko		(substituted on) 76'
DF	33	(Belarus) Dzmitry Zinovich
Manager:
(Belarus) Andrey Skorobogatko

== See also ==
- 2013 Belarusian Premier League
- 2012–13 Belarusian Cup
