= Syarhey =

Syarhey is a Belarusian transcription of the masculine given name Sergey. Notable persons with the name include:

- Syarhey Amelyanchuk (born 1980), Belarusian footballer
- Syarhey Balanovich (born 1987), Belarusian professional footballer
- Syarhey Chernik (born 1988), Belarusian professional footballer
- Syarhey Haydukevich (born 1954), candidate in the 2006 elections for President of Belarus
- Syarhey Herasimets (born 1965), Belarusian professional football coach and a former player
- Syarhey Hihevich (born 1987), Belarusian professional footballer
- Syarhey Hlyabko (born 1992), Belarusian professional football player
- Syarhey Irha (born 1984), Belarusian professional footballer
- Syarhey Kandratsyew (born 1990), Belarusian professional football player
- Syarhey Kantsavy (born 1986), Belarusian professional footballer
- Syarhey Karnilenka (born 1983), Belarusian professional footballer
- Syarhey Kavalchuk (born 1978), Belarusian professional footballer
- Syarhey Kavalyuk (born 1980), Belarusian professional footballer
- Syarhey Kazeka (born 1986), Belarusian footballer (midfielder)
- Syarhey Khaletski (born 1984), Belarusian professional football player
- Syarhey Kislyak (born 1987), Belarusian professional footballer
- Syarhey Koshal (born 1986), Belarusian professional footballer
- Syarhey Kozak (born 1981), Belarusian footballer
- Syarhey Krot (born 1980), Belarusian professional footballer
- Syarhey Kryvets (born 1986), Belarusian football player (midfielder)
- Syarhey Kurhanski (born 1986), Belarusian professional football player
- Syarhey Kuzminich (born 1977), Belarusian professional footballer
- Syarhey Kuznyatsow (born 1979), Belarusian footballer
- Syarhey Lyavitski (born 1990), Belarusian professional footballer
- Syarhey Martynau, Belarusian politician, Minister for Foreign Affairs of Belarus from 2004 to 2012
- Syarhey Matsveychyk (born 1988), Belarusian professional footballer
- Syarhey Nikiforenka (born 1978), Belarusian footballer
- Syarhey Palitsevich (born 1990), Belarusian professional football player
- Syarhey Pawlyukovich (born 1974), Belarusian professional footballer
- Syarhey Sakharuk (born 1982), Belarusian professional footballer
- Syarhey Sasnowski (born 1981), Belarusian footballer (defender)
- Syarhey Shchehrykovich (born 1990), Belarusian professional football player
- Syarhey Shtanyuk (born 1973), Belarusian footballer
- Syarhey Sidorski (born 1954), Prime Minister of Belarus from 10 July 2003 to 28 December 2010
- Syarhey Sinevich (born 1989), Belarusian professional footballer
- Syarhey Vyeramko (born 1982), Belarusian footballer (goalkeeper)
- Syarhey Yaskovich (born 1972), Belarusian professional footballer

== See also ==
- Siarhei/Syarhei
