= Usachyov =

Usachyov or Usachov (Russian: Усачёв) is a Russian masculine surname, its feminine counterpart is Usachyova or Usachova. It may refer to

- Andrei Usachyov (born 1986), Russian football player
- Daria Usacheva (born 2006), Russian figure skater
- Dmitry Usachev (born 1988), Belarusian football player
- Nikolai Usachyov (born 1968), Russian football player
- Yury Usachov (born 1957), Russia cosmonaut
