= Magal =

Magal may refer to:

== People ==
- Magal (footballer, born 1980), Sidnei da Silva, Brazilian right back
- Magal (footballer, born 1987), Magno Aparecido de Andrade, Brazilian left back
- Abba Magal (c. 1800), king of Gibe, leader of the Diggo Oromo
- Aditya Magal (born 1985), Indian author and blogger
- Ivan Magal or Mahal (born 1990), Belarusian footballer
- Jiří Magál (born 1977), Czech cross-country skier
- Ruslan Magal (born 1991), Russian footballer
- Sidney Magal (born 1950), stage name Sidney Magalhães, Brazilian singer, dancer and actor

== Other uses ==
- Magal (kibbutz), a community in Haifa, Israel
- Magal (TV series), a 2007 Indian Tamil-language morning soap opera
- Magal (song), a sung celebration in Nepal
- Magal, a variant of the IMI Galil automatic rifle

== See also ==
- Grand Magal of Touba, a Senegalese pilgrimage
