= 2021 Belarusian Super Cup =

| Shakhtyor Soligorsk | BATE Borisov |
| 0 | 0 |
- Shakhtyor won 5–4 on penalties
- Date: 2 March 2021
- Venue: FC Minsk Stadium, Minsk
- Referee: Amin Kurgheli
- Attendance: 1,500

The 2021 Belarusian Super Cup was held on 2 March 2021 between the 2020 Belarusian Premier League champions Shakhtyor Soligorsk and the 2019–20 Belarusian Cup winners BATE Borisov. Shakhtyor Soligorsk, who were the runners-up in the previous edition of the tournament, won the match 5–4 on penalties and won the trophy for the first time.

== Match details ==
2 March 2021
19:00 UTC+3

| Shakhtyor Soligorsk | 0 – 0 | BATE Borisov |
|---|---|---|
| | Report |
Penalties
| Kendysh (penalty scored); Debelko (penalty scored); Sachywka (penalty scored); Filipenko (penalty missed); Stasevich (penalty scored); Hutar (penalty scored) | 5–4 | (penalty scored) Signevich; (penalty scored) Willumsson; (penalty missed) Skavysh; (penalty scored) Umarov; (penalty scored) Valadzko; (penalty missed) Yablonskiy |

FC Minsk Stadium, Minsk
Referee: Amin Kurgkheli (Gomel)

SHAKHTYOR:
| GK | 30 | (Belarus) Alyaksandr Hutar |
| RB | 99 | (Belarus) Gleb Shevchenko |
| CB | 21 | (Belarus) Egor Filipenko |
| CB | 20 | (Belarus) Alyaksandr Sachywka |
| LB | 5 | (Serbia) Nikola Antić |
| DM | 27 | (Slovakia) Július Szöke | | (substituted off) 31' |
| DM | 77 | (Belarus) Yury Kendysh (c) |
| RM | 11 | (Georgia (country)) Gega Diasamidze | | (substituted off) 59' |
| CAM | 33 | (Nigeria) Eze Vincent Okeuhie | | (substituted off) 87' |
| LM | 22 | (Belarus) Ihar Stasevich |
| FW | 88 | (The Gambia) Dembo Darboe | | (substituted off) 87' |
Substitutes:
| GK | 1 | (Belarus) Syarhey Chernik |
| DF | 4 | (Belarus) Ruslan Khadarkevich |
| MF | 8 | (Albania) Valon Ahmedi | | (substituted on) 59' |
| MF | 10 | (Belarus) Pavel Zabelin |
| MF | 18 | (Belarus) Nikita Korzun | (yellow card) 90+4' | (substituted on) 31' |
| FW | 19 | (Belarus) Dzmitry Padstrelaw |
| DF | 28 | (Serbia) Igor Ivanović | | (substituted on) 87' |
| FW | 31 | (Ukraine) Roman Debelko | | (substituted on) 87' |
| DF | 67 | (Belarus) Roman Begunov |
Manager:
(Ukraine) Roman Hryhorchuk

BATE:
| GK | 35 | (Belarus) Anton Chichkan |
| RB | 17 | (Belarus) Danila Nechayev |
| CB | 27 | (Belarus) Pavel Rybak |
| CB | 32 | (Croatia) Jakov Filipović |
| LB | 4 | (Serbia) Aleksandar Filipović | | (substituted off) 46' |
| RW | 26 | (Serbia) Nemanja Milić | | (substituted off) 63' |
| CM | 5 | (Belarus) Yevgeniy Yablonskiy | (yellow card) 27' |
| CM | 25 | (Russia) Pavel Karasyov | (yellow card) 86' | (substituted off) 89' |
| LW | 33 | (Belarus) Pavel Nyakhaychyk (c) |
| FW | 11 | (Belarus) Anton Saroka | (yellow card) 61' | (substituted off) 63' |
| FW | 13 | (Belarus) Mikalay Signevich |
Substitutes:
| GK | 16 | (Belarus) Andrey Kudravets |
| MF | 6 | (Belarus) Syarhey Volkaw |
| MF | 10 | (Uzbekistan) Shokhboz Umarov | | (substituted on) 63' |
| DF | 14 | (Montenegro) Boris Kopitović |
| FW | 15 | (Belarus) Maksim Skavysh | | (substituted on) 63' |
| MF | 18 | (Iceland) Willum Þór Willumsson | | (substituted on) 89' |
| MF | 19 | (Belarus) Dmitriy Bessmertny |
| MF | 22 | (Belarus) Aleksey Nosko |
| DF | 92 | (Belarus) Maksim Valadzko | | (substituted on) 46' |
Manager:
(Belarus) Vitaly Zhukovsky

== See also ==
- 2020 Belarusian Premier League
- 2019–20 Belarusian Cup
