= Zhurov =

Zhurov or Zhuraw (Russian: Журов) is a Russian masculine surname, its feminine counterpart is Zhurova or Zhurawa. It may refer to

- Svetlana Zhurova (born 1972), Russian speed skater
- Uladzimir Zhuraw (born 1991), Belarusian football player
