= Syarhey Shchehrykovich =

Belarusian footballer

Personal information
- Date of birth: 19 December 1990 (age 35)
- Place of birth: Minsk, Belarusian SSR
- Height: 1.76 m (5 ft 9 1/2 in)
- Position: Right-back

Youth career
- 2007–2009: MTZ-RIPO Minsk

Senior career*
Years	Team	Apps	(Gls)
2007	MTZ-RIPO-2 Minsk	26	(0)
2008–2010	Partizan Minsk	2	(0)
2010–2011	Dinamo Brest	25	(1)
2012	Minsk	7	(0)
2013	Smolevichi-STI	19	(1)
2014–2015	Slavia Mozyr	45	(0)
2016	Krumkachy Minsk	29	(2)
2017–2018	Slutsk	35	(0)
2019	Rukh Brest	8	(0)
2020	Ostrovets	16	(3)

International career
2011	Belarus U21	1	(0)
- * Club domestic league appearances and goals as of 31 December 2020

Syarhey Shchehrykovich (Belarusian: Сяргей Шчэгрыковіч; Russian: Серге́й Щегрикович, Sergey Shchegrikovich; born 19 December 1990) is a Belarusian former professional football player.

His cousin Dzmitry Shchagrykovich is also a professional footballer.

== Honours ==
Minsk

- Belarusian Cup winner: 2012–13
