= Siarhei =

Siarhei, Siarhiej, Syarhei, or Syarhey (Belarusian: Сяргей) is a Belarusian transcription of the Slavic masculine given name Sergey. Notable persons with the name include:

- Siarhei Charnou (born 1979), Belarusian race walker
- Siarhiej Dubaviec (born 1959), Belarusian journalist
- Siarhei Kukharenka (born 1976), Belarusian judoka
- Siarhei Lahun (1988–2011), Belarusian weightlifter
- Siarhei Navumchyk (born 1961), Belarusian journalist and politician
- Siarhei Novikau (born 1982), Belarusian judoka
- Syarhei Parsyukevich (born 1967), Belarusian small business owner
- Siarhei Rutenka (born 1981), Spanish handball player
- Siarhei Shundzikau (born 1981), Belarusian judoka
- Siarhei Tsikhanouski (born 1978), Belarusian dissident

== See also ==
- Syarhey
