= Mikita Bukatkin =

Belarusian footballer

Personal information
- Date of birth: 7 March 1988 (age 38)
- Place of birth: Minsk, Belarusian SSR
- Height: 1.74 m (5 ft 9 in)
- Position: Midfielder

Youth career
- 2005–2007: Shakhtyor Soligorsk

Senior career*
Years	Team	Apps	(Gls)
2007–2009	Shakhtyor Soligorsk	41	(2)
2009–2012	Naftan Novopolotsk	94	(7)
2013	Minsk	23	(1)
2014	Belshina Bobruisk	26	(1)
2015	Mash'al Mubarek	27	(2)
2016	Belshina Bobruisk	12	(0)
2016–2017	Dinamo Brest	26	(1)
2017–2018	Isloch Minsk Raion	33	(0)
2019	Rukh Brest	25	(1)
2020	Altai Semey	9	(0)
2021	Ostrovets	21	(2)
2022–2023	SDYuShOR BFSO Dinamo Minsk	16	(1)

International career
2008–2011	Belarus U21	19	(0)
2011	Belarus Olympic	4	(0)
- * Club domestic league appearances and goals as of 31 December 2023

Mikita Bukatkin (Belarusian: Мікіта Букаткін; Russian: Никита Букаткин; born 7 March 1988) is a Belarusian footballer.

== International career ==
Bukatkin was a member of the Belarus U21 that finished in 3rd place at the 2011 UEFA European Under-21 Football Championship. He played 3 matches.

== Honours ==
Naftan Novopolotsk

- Belarusian Cup winner: 2011–12

Minsk

- Belarusian Cup winner: 2012–13

Dinamo Brest

- Belarusian Cup winner: 2016–17, 2017–18
