= 2018 Belarusian Super Cup =

Football match

BATE Borisov	Dinamo Brest
1	2
- Date: 10 March 2018
- Venue: FC Minsk Stadium, Minsk
- Referee: Aleksei Kulbakov

The 2018 Belarusian Super Cup was held on 10 March 2018 between the 2017 Belarusian Premier League champions BATE Borisov and the 2016–17 Belarusian Cup winners Dinamo Brest. Dinamo Brest won the match 2–1, winning the trophy for the first time.

== Match details ==
10 March 2018
16:30 UTC+3

BATE Borisov	1 – 2	Dinamo Brest
Signevich 90+3'	Report	Gotal 14' (pen.); Vitus 30'

FC Minsk Stadium, Minsk
Referee: Aleksei Kulbakov (Gomel)

BATE:
GK	48	(Belarus) Denis Scherbitskiy
RB	4	(Serbia) Aleksandar Filipović
CB	6	(Serbia) Nikola Vasiljević
CB	19	(Serbia) Nemanja Milunović
LB	42	(Belarus) Maksim Volodko
DM	21	(Belarus) Stanislaw Drahun	(yellow card) 82'
DM	27	(Serbia) Slobodan Simović	(yellow card) 11'
RM	25	(Belarus) Dzmitry Baha
CAM	10	(Montenegro) Mirko Ivanić
LM	22	(Belarus) Ihar Stasevich (c)
FW	15	(Belarus) Maksim Skavysh		(substituted off) 49'
Substitutes:
GK	30	(Belarus) Aleksey Chernykh
MF	5	(Belarus) Yevgeniy Yablonskiy
MF	7	(Belarus) Yevgeniy Berezkin
FW	11	(Belarus) Ilya Sen
FW	13	(Belarus) Mikalay Signevich		(substituted on) 49'
MF	23	(Belarus) Zakhar Volkov
DF	34	(Belarus) Vladislav Malkevich
DF	44	(Belarus) Artem Shkurdyuk
FW	45	(Belarus) Vladislav Mukhamedov
Manager:
(Belarus) Oleg Dulub

DINAMO:
GK	30	(Belarus) Alyaksandr Hutar
RB	21	(Belarus) Aleh Veratsila
CB	4	(Belarus) Alyaksey Hawrylovich (c)
CB	16	(Greece) Giannis Kargas
LB	13	(Belarus) Maksim Vitus		(substituted off) 50'
DM	55	(Slovenia) Željko Filipović		(substituted off) 82'
DM	99	(Nigeria) Chidi Osuchukwu	(yellow card) 40'
RM	88	(Belarus) Pavel Savitski		(substituted off) 81'
CAM	7	(Ukraine) Artem Milevskyi
LM	33	(Belarus) Pavel Nyakhaychyk
FW	9	(Austria) Sandro Gotal		(substituted off) 60'
Substitutes:
GK	35	(Belarus) Pavel Pavlyuchenko
DF	5	(Belarus) Andrey Lebedzew		(substituted on) 50'
MF	8	(Belarus) Kirill Premudrov		(substituted on) 60'
FW	10	(Belarus) Raman Vasilyuk
MF	17	(Belarus) Pavel Sedko		(substituted on) 81'
FW	20	(Ghana) Joel Fameyeh
MF	31	(Belarus) Andrey Zaleski
MF	46	(Belarus) Alyaksey Lyahchylin		(substituted on) 82'
MF	95	(Belarus) Dzmitry Barysaw
Manager:
(Czech Republic) Radoslav Látal

== See also ==
- 2017 Belarusian Premier League
- 2016–17 Belarusian Cup
