= Artsyom Buloychyk =

Belarusian professional football player

Personal information
- Date of birth: 16 June 1992 (age 34)
- Place of birth: Bobruisk, Mogilev Oblast, Belarus
- Height: 1.77 m (5 ft 10 in)
- Position: Midfielder

Team information
- Current team: Baltika Kaliningrad (assistant manager)

Youth career
- 2007–2010: Dinamo Minsk

Senior career*
Years	Team	Apps	(Gls)
2010–2012	Dinamo Minsk	8	(0)
2013	Minsk	12	(0)
2014	Bereza-2010	7	(0)
2015	1625 Liepāja	12	(10)
2015	Dnepr Mogilev	13	(2)
2016	Luch Minsk	9	(2)
2016	Torpedo Minsk	11	(1)
2017–2018	Luch Minsk	50	(4)
2019	NFK Minsk	11	(1)
2020	Gomel	11	(0)

International career
2012	Belarus U21	2	(0)

Managerial career
- 2020: Energetik-BGU Minsk (assistant)
- 2021–2022: Vitebsk-2
- 2021–2022: Vitebsk (assistant)
- 2022–2024: Baltika Kaliningrad (assistant)
- 2025: Shinnik Yaroslavl (assistant)
- 2025–2026: Shinnik Yaroslavl
- 2026–: Baltika Kaliningrad (assistant)
- * Club domestic league appearances and goals

Artsyom Buloychyk (Belarusian: Арцём Булойчык; Russian: Артём Булойчик; born 16 June 1992) is a Belarusian professional football coach and a former player. He is an assistant manager of Russian club Baltika Kaliningrad.

== Honours ==
Minsk

- Belarusian Cup winner: 2012–13
