= Dzmitry Barysaw =

Belarusian professional footballer

Personal information
- Date of birth: 8 January 1995 (age 31)
- Place of birth: Novopolotsk, Vitebsk Oblast, Belarus
- Height: 1.86 m (6 ft 1 in)
- Position: Midfielder

Team information
- Current team: Miory

Youth career
- 2013–2016: Naftan Novopolotsk

Senior career*
Years	Team	Apps	(Gls)
2016	Naftan Novopolotsk	20	(4)
2017–2018	Dinamo Brest	5	(1)
2019	Neman Grodno	2	(0)
2019–2021	Naftan Novopolotsk	53	(2)
2022	Smorgon	18	(3)
2023–	Miory	17	(3)

International career
2016	Belarus U21	5	(0)
- * Club domestic league appearances and goals as of 31 December 2023

Dzmitry Barysaw (Belarusian: Дзмітрый Барысаў; Russian: Дмитрий Борисов; born 8 January 1995) is a Belarusian professional footballer who plays for Miory.

== Honours ==
Dinamo Brest

- Belarusian Cup winner: 2016–17, 2017–18
- Belarusian Super Cup winner: 2018
