= Gleb Shevchenko =

Belarusian footballer

Personal information
- Full name: Gleb Vyacheslavovich Shevchenko
- Date of birth: 17 February 1999 (age 27)
- Place of birth: Mozyr, Gomel Oblast, Belarus
- Height: 1.78 m (5 ft 10 in)
- Position: Right back

Team information
- Current team: Torpedo Moscow
- Number: 99

Youth career
- –2014: SDYuShOR №1 Mozyr
- 2015–2016: Slavia Mozyr

Senior career*
Years	Team	Apps	(Gls)
2016–2020	Slavia Mozyr	85	(6)
2021–2023	Shakhtyor Soligorsk	66	(1)
2023–	Torpedo Moscow	85	(3)

International career^{‡}
2017	Belarus U-18	10	(1)
2017	Belarus U-19	5	(0)
2017–2020	Belarus U-21	12	(0)
2021–	Belarus	20	(0)
- * Club domestic league appearances and goals as of 16 May 2026 ‡ National team caps and goals as of 9 June 2026

Gleb Vyacheslavovich Shevchenko (Belarusian: Глеб Вячаслававіч Шаўчэнка; Russian: Глеб Вячеславович Шевченко; born 17 February 1999) is a Belarusian professional footballer who plays for Russian club Torpedo Moscow and the Belarus national team.

== International career ==
He made his debut for the national team on 2 June 2021 in a friendly against Azerbaijan.

== Career statistics ==
As of 16 May 2026

Club	Season	League			Cup		Continental		Other		Total	
Club	Season	Division	Apps	Goals	Apps	Goals	Apps	Goals	Apps	Goals	Apps	Goals
Slavia Mozyr	2016	Belarusian Premier League	2	0	1	0	–		–		3	0
Slavia Mozyr	2017	Belarusian Premier League	18	0	1	0	–		–		19	0
Slavia Mozyr	2018	Belarusian First League	19	4	3	1	–		–		22	5
Slavia Mozyr	2019	Belarusian Premier League	22	0	1	0	–		–		23	0
Slavia Mozyr	2020	Belarusian Premier League	24	2	3	0	–		–		27	2
Slavia Mozyr	Total		85	6	9	1	0	0	0	0	94	7
Shakhtyor Soligorsk	2021	Belarusian Premier League	26	1	2	0	2 (Note: Appearances in the UEFA Champions League)	0	1 (Note: Appearances in Belarusian Super Cup)	0	31	1
Shakhtyor Soligorsk	2022	Belarusian Premier League	28	0	2	0	2	0	1	0	33	0
Shakhtyor Soligorsk	2023	Belarusian Premier League	12	0	1	0	–		1	0	14	0
Shakhtyor Soligorsk	Total		66	1	5	0	4	0	3	0	78	1
Torpedo Moscow	2023–24	Russian First League	29	0	1	0	–		–		30	0
Torpedo Moscow	2024–25	Russian First League	32	0	0	0	–		–		32	0
Torpedo Moscow	2025–26	Russian First League	24	3	4	0	–		–		28	3
Torpedo Moscow	Total		85	3	5	0	0	0	0	0	90	3
Career total			236	10	19	1	4	0	3	0	262	11

== Honours ==
Shakhtyor Soligorsk

- Belarusian Premier League: 2021
- Belarusian Super Cup: 2021, 2023
