= Hernán Figueredo =

Uruguayan footballer (born 1985)

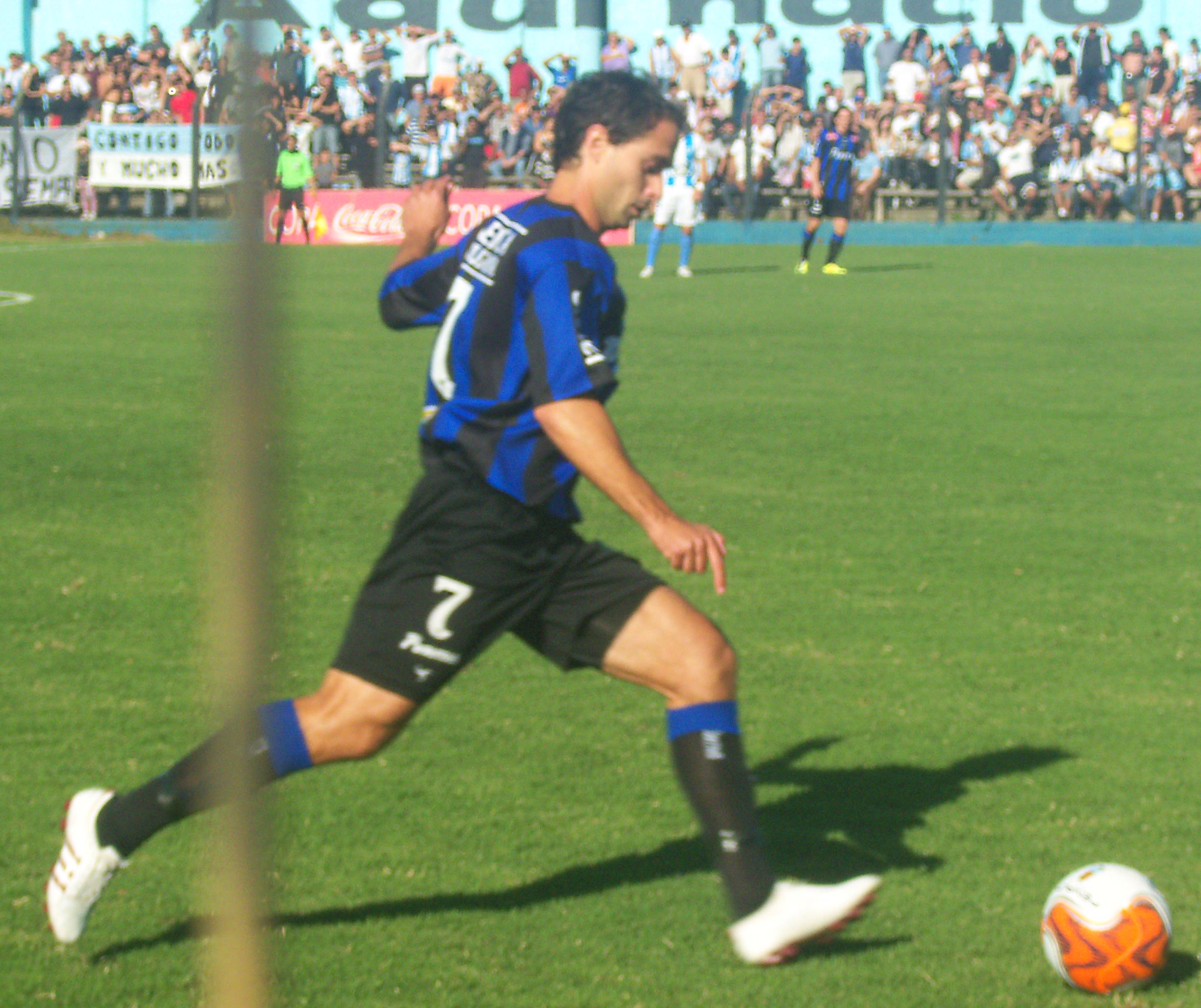

Personal information
- Full name: Hernán Figueredo Alonzo
- Date of birth: 15 May 1985 (age 41)
- Place of birth: Montevideo, Uruguay
- Height: 1.78 m (5 ft 10 in)
- Position: Midfielder

Team information
- Current team: Liverpool Montevideo (youth manager)

Senior career*
Years	Team	Apps	(Gls)
2006–2009	Bella Vista	41	(7)
2008	→ Villa Española (loan)	13	(4)
2009–2012	Liverpool Montevideo	74	(9)
2012–2014	Dinamo Minsk	75	(18)
2015	Deportes Tolima	19	(0)
2016–2017	Torque	46	(9)
2018–2022	Liverpool Montevideo	164	(13)
2023	Defensor Sporting	10	(1)
2024	Durazno		

Managerial career
- 2025–: Liverpool Montevideo (youth)
- * Club domestic league appearances and goals

Hernán Figueredo Alonzo (born 15 May 1985) is a Uruguayan football manager and former player who played as a midfielder. He is the current manager of Liverpool Montevideo's youth categories.

== Career ==
Figueredo started his career playing with his home team C.A. Bella Vista. In mid 2008, he was sent out on loan for six-months to C.S.D. Villa Española.

In August 2009, he signed a new deal with Liverpool F.C. (Montevideo), team which he participated in the 2009 Copa Sudamericana and the 2011 Copa Libertadores.

On 19 June 2012, he was transferred to the Belarusian side FC Dinamo Minsk.

In 2018, Figueredo rejoined Liverpool. He won the 2019 Torneo Intermedio, the 2020 Supercopa Uruguaya and the 2020 Torneo Clausura in his second stint with the club.
