= Pavel Markaw =

Belarusian footballer

Personal information
- Date of birth: 4 December 1991 (age 34)
- Place of birth: Mogilev, Belarus
- Height: 1.87 m (6 ft 2 in)
- Position: Midfielder

Youth career
- 2010–2011: Dnepr Mogilev

Senior career*
| Years | Team | Apps | (Gls) |
| 2011–2016 | Dnepr Mogilev | 75 | (6) |
| 2012 | → Polotsk (loan) | 21 | (0) |
| 2017 | Lokomotiv Gomel | 27 | (1) |
| 2018 | Granit Mikashevichi | 12 | (1) |
| 2018–2021 | Lokomotiv Gomel | 82 | (12) |
| 2021–2023 | Dnepr Mogilev | 69 | (3) |
| 2024 | Lokomotiv Gomel | 28 | (1) |
| 2025 | Dnepr Mogilev | 6 | (0) |
- * Club domestic league appearances and goals as of 3 April 2026

Pavel Markaw (Belarusian: Павел Маркаў; Russian: Павел Марков; born 4 December 1991) is a Belarusian footballer, who last played for Dnepr Mogilev.
