= Syarhey Kurhanski =

Belarusian footballer

Personal information
- Date of birth: 15 May 1986 (age 40)
- Place of birth: Grodno, Byelorussian SSR, Soviet Union
- Height: 1.91 m (6 ft 3 in)
- Position: Goalkeeper

Team information
- Current team: Maxline Vitebsk
- Number: 12

Youth career
- 2003–2005: Neman Grodno

Senior career*
Years	Team	Apps	(Gls)
2005–2009	Neman Grodno	4	(0)
2007–2008	→ Savit Mogilev (loan)	19	(0)
2008–2009	→ MTZ-RIPO Minsk (loan)	5	(0)
2009	→ Belshina Bobruisk (loan)	13	(0)
2010	Dinamo Brest	1	(0)
2011	Partizan Minsk	9	(0)
2012	Dnepr Mogilev	14	(0)
2013	Slonim	13	(0)
2014	Lida	21	(0)
2015–2023	Neman Grodno	113	(0)
2023–	Maxline Vitebsk	8	(0)
- * Club domestic league appearances and goals as of 31 December 2023

Syarhey Kurhanski (Belarusian: Сяргей Курганскі; Russian: Серге́й Курганский; born 15 May 1986) is a Belarusian professional football player currently playing for Maxline Vitebsk.
