= Nikolai Usachyov =

Russian footballer

Personal information
- Full name: Nikolai Valeryevich Usachyov
- Date of birth: 12 March 1968 (age 58)
- Place of birth: Leningrad, Russian SFSR
- Height: 1.71 m (5 ft 7 1/2 in)
- Positions: Defender; forward; midfielder

Senior career*
Years	Team	Apps	(Gls)
1985–1987	FC Zenit Leningrad	0	(0)
1988–1989	FC Dynamo Leningrad	64	(6)
1990–1992	FC Zenit Saint Petersburg	87	(9)
- * Club domestic league appearances and goals

Nikolai Valeryevich Usachyov (Russian: Николай Валерьевич Усачёв; born 12 March 1968) is a former Russian football player.
