= Mihail Harnak =

Belarusian footballer

Personal information
- Date of birth: 9 March 1989 (age 37)
- Height: 1.78 m (5 ft 10 in)
- Position: Forward

Youth career
- 2007–2008: MTZ-RIPO Minsk

Senior career*
Years	Team	Apps	(Gls)
2008–2011	Partizan Minsk	31	(4)
2009	→ Belshina Bobruisk (loan)	9	(1)
2010	→ SKVICH Minsk (loan)	14	(4)
2012	Granit Mikashevichi	26	(7)
2013–2014	Bereza-2010	57	(10)
2015	Krumkachy Minsk	10	(1)
- * Club domestic league appearances and goals as of 1 December 2015

Mihail Harnak (Belarusian: Міхаіл Гарнак; Russian: Михаил Горнак; born 9 March 1989) is a retired Belarusian professional footballer.
