= Alyaksandr Rayewski =

Belarusian footballer

Personal information
- Date of birth: 19 June 1988 (age 38)
- Place of birth: Mozyr, Gomel Oblast, Belarusian SSR
- Height: 1.80 m (5 ft 11 in)
- Position: Midfielder

Team information
- Current team: Slavia Mozyr (reserves coach)

Youth career
- 2005: Slavia Mozyr
- 2006–2007: Dnepr Mogilev

Senior career*
| Years | Team | Apps | (Gls) |
| 2006 | Gorki | 15 | (1) |
| 2007–2009 | Dnepr Mogilev | 17 | (0) |
| 2009–2012 | Slavia Mozyr | 63 | (3) |
| 2013 | Khimik Svetlogorsk | 21 | (3) |
| 2014–2021 | Slavia Mozyr | 154 | (8) |

Managerial career
- 2022–: Slavia Mozyr (reserves)
- * Club domestic league appearances and goals

Alyaksandr Rayewski (Belarusian: Аляксандр Раеўскі; Russian: Александр Раевский; born 19 June 1988) is a Belarusian professional football coach and former player.
