= Nikita Khalimonchik =

Belarusian footballer

Personal information
- Date of birth: 3 January 2000 (age 26)
- Place of birth: Minsk, Belarus
- Height: 1.73 m (5 ft 8 in)
- Position: Defender

Youth career
- 2014–2019: Dinamo Minsk

Senior career*
Years	Team	Apps	(Gls)
2018–2022	Dinamo Minsk	3	(0)
2020	→ Smolevichi (loan)	9	(0)
2021	→ Neman Grodno (loan)	13	(0)
2022	→ Minsk (loan)	21	(0)
2023–2024	Arsenal Dzerzhinsk	11	(0)

International career^{‡}
2018	Belarus U19	3	(0)
2021–2022	Belarus U21	7	(0)
- * Club domestic league appearances and goals as of 5 December 2024 ‡ National team caps and goals as of 8 June 2022

Nikita Khalimonchik (Belarusian: Мікіта Халімончык; Russian: Никита Халимончик; born 3 January 2000) is a Belarusian professional footballer.
