= Kirill Premudrov =

Belarusian footballer

Personal information
- Date of birth: 11 June 1992 (age 34)
- Place of birth: Brest, Belarus
- Height: 1.83 m (6 ft 0 in)
- Position: Midfielder

Team information
- Current team: Torpedo-BelAZ Zhodino
- Number: 6

Youth career
- 2009–2011: Dinamo Brest

Senior career*
Years	Team	Apps	(Gls)
2011–2015	Dinamo Brest	109	(15)
2015–2017	Dinamo Minsk	44	(5)
2017–2018	Dinamo Brest	24	(0)
2018	→ Luch Minsk (loan)	13	(0)
2019–	Torpedo-BelAZ Zhodino	169	(17)

International career
2012–2013	Belarus U21	12	(0)
- * Club domestic league appearances and goals as of 3 July 2026

Kirill Premudrov (Belarusian: Кiрыл Прамудраў; Russian: Кирилл Премудров; born 11 June 1992) is a Belarusian professional footballer who plays for Torpedo-BelAZ Zhodino.

== Honours ==
Dinamo Brest

- Belarusian Cup winner: 2017–18
- Belarusian Super Cup winner: 2018
