= Sergey Pushnyakov =

Belarusian footballer

Personal information
- Full name: Sergey Vitalyevich Pushnyakov
- Date of birth: 8 February 1993 (age 33)
- Place of birth: Minsk, Belarus
- Height: 1.90 m (6 ft 3 in)
- Position: Attacking midfielder

Team information
- Current team: Neman Grodno
- Number: 9

Youth career
- 2009–2010: Minsk

Senior career*
Years	Team	Apps	(Gls)
2011–2015	Minsk	71	(4)
2016–2017	Spartaks Jūrmala	42	(0)
2018–2021	Gorodeya	70	(7)
2021–2022	Persikabo 1973	30	(2)
2022	Minsk	15	(1)
2023–2024	Slutsk	56	(10)
2025–	Neman Grodno	41	(6)

International career
2012–2013	Belarus U21	17	(0)
- * Club domestic league appearances and goals as of 3 July 2026

Sergey Vitalyevich Pushnyakov (Russian: Пушняков Сергей Витальевич; born 8 February 1993) is a Belarusian professional footballer who plays as an attacking midfielder for Neman Grodno.

== Career ==
During 2021–2022 he played in Indonesia for Persikabo 1973.

=== Honours ===
Minsk

- Belarusian Cup winner: 2012–13

Spartaks Jūrmala

- Latvian Higher League champion: 2016, 2017
