= Vitaly Novik =

Belarusian footballer

Personal information
- Date of birth: 9 November 1994 (age 32)
- Place of birth: Kalinkavichy, Gomel Oblast, Belarus
- Height: 1.72 m (5 ft 7 1/2 in)
- Position: Defender

Team information
- Current team: Neman-Belcard Grodno

Youth career
- 2011–2014: Gomel

Senior career*
Years	Team	Apps	(Gls)
2013–2017	Gomel	17	(0)
2017–2018	Sputnik Rechitsa	8	(0)
2021	Bumprom Gomel	15	(1)
2022–	Neman-Belcard Grodno	29	(7)
- * Club domestic league appearances and goals as of 31 December 20283

Vitaly Novik (Belarusian: Вiталь Новiк; Russian: Виталий Новик; born 9 November 1994) is a Belarusian professional footballer who plays for Neman-Belcard Grodno.
