= Júlio César (footballer, born 1996) =

Brazilian footballer (born 1996)

Personal information
- Full name: Júlio César Basílio da Silva
- Date of birth: 6 December 1996 (age 29)
- Place of birth: Mogi das Cruzes, Brazil
- Height: 1.92 m (6 ft 4 in)
- Position: Centre-back

Team information
- Current team: Hoang Anh Gia Lai
- Number: 5

Youth career
- 2015–2018: Corinthians

Senior career*
Years	Team	Apps	(Gls)
2018	América de Natal	2	(0)
2019	Vilafranca	0	(0)
2020–2022	Vitebsk	73	(8)
2023–2024	Borneo Samarinda	15	(0)
2023–2024	→ Veres Rivne (loan)	13	(0)
2024–2025	Uthai Thani	24	(1)
2025–2026	Navbahor	8	(0)
2026	Toktogul		
2026–	Hoang Anh Gia Lai	1	(0)
- * Club domestic league appearances and goals as of 6 September 2026

Júlio César Basílio da Silva (born 6 December 1996) is a Brazilian professional footballer who plays as a centre-back who plays for V.League 1 club Hoang Anh Gia Lai.
