= Yawhen Minenkow =

Belarusian footballer

Personal information
- Date of birth: 11 April 1988 (age 38)
- Place of birth: Borisov, Minsk Oblast, Byelorussian SSR, Soviet Union
- Height: 1.86 m (6 ft 1 in)
- Position: Defender

Youth career
- 2005: BATE Borisov
- 2006–2007: Darida Minsk Raion

Senior career*
Years	Team	Apps	(Gls)
2008	Darida Minsk Raion	19	(0)
2009–2011	Rudensk	44	(1)
2012–2014	Smolevichi-STI	70	(3)
2014–2015	Slavia Mozyr	14	(0)
2016	Slonim	20	(1)
2017	Orsha	18	(0)
2021	Krupki-DRSU-164	11	(0)
- * Club domestic league appearances and goals as of 31 December 2021

Yawhen Minenkow (Belarusian: Яўген Міненкоў, Russian: Евгений Миненков; born 11 April 1988) is a Belarusian former professional footballer.
