= Yevgeny Leshko =

Belarusian footballer

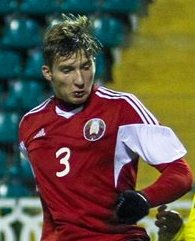

Personal information
- Full name: Yevgeny Valeryevich Leshko
- Date of birth: 24 June 1996 (age 30)
- Place of birth: Lutskovlyany, Grodno Oblast, Belarus
- Height: 1.76 m (5 ft 9 1/2 in)
- Position: Defender

Youth career
- 2012–2014: Neman Grodno

Senior career*
Years	Team	Apps	(Gls)
2015–2023	Neman Grodno	85	(0)
2017	→ Lida (loan)	12	(0)

International career^{‡}
2012	Belarus U17	3	(0)
2014	Belarus U19	2	(0)
2015–2018	Belarus U21	5	(0)
- * Club domestic league appearances and goals as of 31 December 2023 ‡ National team caps and goals as of 8 June 2018

Yevgeny Valeryevich Leshko (Belarusian: Яўген Валер'евіч Ляшко; Russian: Евгений Валерьевич Лешко; born 24 June 1996) is a Belarusian professional football player.
