= Syarhey Sinevich =

Belarusian footballer

Personal information
- Date of birth: 11 January 1989 (age 37)
- Position: Goalkeeper

Youth career
- 2004–2006: Zvezda-BGU Minsk

Senior career*
Years	Team	Apps	(Gls)
2006–2007	Zvezda-BGU Minsk	27	(0)
2008–2009	Torpedo Zhodino	17	(0)

International career
2005	Belarus U-17		
2007	Belarus U-19		
2009	Belarus U-21	1	(0)
- * Club domestic league appearances and goals

Syarhey Sinevich (Belarusian: Сяргей Сіневіч; Russian: Серге́й Синевич; born 11 January 1989) is a retired Belarusian professional footballer.
