= Ruslan Khadarkevich =

Belarusian footballer

Personal information
- Date of birth: 18 June 1993 (age 33)
- Place of birth: Minsk, Belarus
- Height: 1.85 m (6 ft 1 in)
- Position: Centre-back

Team information
- Current team: Minsk
- Number: 4

Youth career
- 2007–2009: Minsk

Senior career*
Years	Team	Apps	(Gls)
2010–2013	Bereza-2010	77	(1)
2014	Slavia Mozyr	8	(0)
2015–2016	Smolevichi-STI	47	(1)
2017–2019	Slavia Mozyr	46	(0)
2019–2022	Shakhtyor Soligorsk	41	(0)
2023	Dinamo Minsk	0	(0)
2023–2024	BATE Borisov	24	(1)
2025	Minsk	12	(1)
2025	Atyrau	10	(0)
2026	Irtysh Pavlodar	5	(0)
2026–	Minsk	4	(1)

International career^{‡}
2021–2023	Belarus	9	(0)
- * Club domestic league appearances and goals as of 21 August 2026 ‡ National team caps and goals as of 28 March 2023

Ruslan Khadarkevich (Belarusian: Руслан Хадаркевіч; Russian: Руслан Хадаркевич; born 18 June 1993) is a Belarusian professional footballer who plays for Kazakhstani club Minsk.

== International career ==
He was first called up to the Belarus national football team in November 2020 for UEFA Nations League games. He made his debut on 2 June 2021 in a friendly against Azerbaijan.

== Honours ==
Shakhtyor Soligorsk

- Belarusian Premier League champion: 2020, 2021
- Belarusian Super Cup winner: 2021
