= Syarhey Sakharuk =

Belarusian footballer

Personal information
- Date of birth: 25 September 1982 (age 44)
- Place of birth: Pruzhany, Brest Oblast, Belarusian SSR
- Height: 1.84 m (6 ft 1/2 in)
- Position: Goalkeeper

Youth career
- 2000–2003: Dinamo Brest

Senior career*
Years	Team	Apps	(Gls)
1998–1999	Pruzhany	17	(0)
2000–2009	Dinamo Brest	24	(0)
2005	→ Pinsk-900 (loan)	16	(0)
2010	Kommunalnik Slonim	26	(0)
2011–2013	Pruzhany		
2021–2023	Krechet Bereza	3	(0)
- * Club domestic league appearances and goals as of 31 December 2023

Syarhey Sakharuk (Belarusian: Сяргей Сахарук; Russian: Серге́й Сахарук; born 25 September 1982) is a retired Belarusian professional footballer.
