= Eduard Zhevnerov =

Belarusian footballer

Personal information
- Full name: Eduard Stanislavovich Zhevnerov
- Date of birth: 1 November 1987 (age 39)
- Place of birth: Mogilev, Belarusian SSR, Soviet Union
- Height: 1.86 m (6 ft 1 in)
- Position: Defender

Senior career*
Years	Team	Apps	(Gls)
2006–2008	Savit Mogilev	32	(0)
2007	→ Spartak Shklov (loan)	19	(0)
2009–2010	Dnepr Mogilev	30	(1)
2011–2012	Dinamo Minsk	14	(0)
2012	→ Dnepr Mogilev (loan)	6	(0)
2012	Belshina Bobruisk	2	(0)
2013	Slavia Mozyr	0	(0)
2013	→ Vitebsk (loan)	26	(0)
2014–2015	Dinamo Brest	48	(1)
2016	Dnepr Mogilev	9	(0)
2016	Belshina Bobruisk	9	(0)
2017	Jonava	18	(0)
2018	Belshina Bobruisk	28	(2)
2019–2020	Smolevichi	51	(0)
2021–2022	Slutsk	32	(0)
2022	Minsk	15	(0)
2023	Isloch Minsk Raion	0	(0)
2023–2024	Arsenal Dzerzhinsk	40	(3)
2024–2025	Minsk	31	(2)
2026	Molodechno	8	(0)

International career^{‡}
2010	Belarus	1	(0)
- * Club domestic league appearances and goals as of 1 September 2026 ‡ National team caps and goals as of 5 September 2010

Eduard Zhevnerov (Belarusian: Эдуард Жаўнераў; Russian: Эдуард Жевнеров; born 1 November 1987) is a Belarusian professional footballer.

== Career ==
On 11 August 2010, Zhevnerov played his only match for the national side, coming on as a last-minute substitute in a friendly match against Lithuania.
