= Aleksandr Nemirko =

Belarusian footballer

Personal information
- Date of birth: 8 February 2000 (age 26)
- Place of birth: Minsk, Belarus
- Height: 1.74 m (5 ft 9 in)
- Position: Midfielder

Youth career
- 2015–2018: BATE Borisov

Senior career*
Years	Team	Apps	(Gls)
2018–2020	BATE Borisov	0	(0)
2019	→ Gomel (loan)	2	(0)
2020	→ Dnepr Mogilev (loan)	22	(1)
2021–2022	Dnepr Mogilev	48	(1)

International career
2016–2017	Belarus U17	6	(0)
2018	Belarus U19	3	(0)
- * Club domestic league appearances and goals as of 31 December 2022

Aleksandr Nemirko (Belarusian: Аляксандр Нямірка; Russian: Александр Немирко; born 8 February 2000) is a Belarusian professional footballer.
