= Yevgeniy Velko =

Belarusian footballer (born 1997)

Personal information
- Date of birth: 23 February 1997 (age 29)
- Place of birth: Brest, Belarus
- Height: 1.78 m (5 ft 10 in)
- Position: Midfielder

Youth career
- 2013–2016: Dinamo Minsk

Senior career*
Years	Team	Apps	(Gls)
2016–2018	Dinamo Minsk	0	(0)
2017–2018	→ Luch Minsk (loan)	32	(3)
2018	Luch Minsk	13	(1)
2019	Dnyapro Mogilev	16	(0)
2020–2023	Slutsk	59	(1)

International career
2013	Belarus U17	3	(0)
2015	Belarus U19	2	(0)
2017	Belarus U21	1	(0)
- * Club domestic league appearances and goals as of 31 December 2022

Yevgeniy Velko (Belarusian: Яўген Вялько; Russian: Евгений Велько; born 23 February 1997) is a Belarusian professional footballer who plays for Slutsk.
