= Denis Dechko =

Belarusian former footballer (born 1990)

Personal information
- Date of birth: 26 April 1990 (age 36)
- Place of birth: Minsk, Belarusian SSR
- Height: 1.90 m (6 ft 3 in)
- Position: Goalkeeper

Youth career
- 2006: PMC Postavy
- 2007–2009: MTZ-RIPO Minsk

Senior career*
Years	Team	Apps	(Gls)
2006	PMC Postavy	4	(0)
2010	Partizan Minsk	4	(0)
2012	Minsk-2	36	(0)
2013–2015	Minsk	12	(0)
2015	→ Bereza-2010 (loan)	9	(0)
2016	Dinamo Brest	4	(0)
2016	Belshina Bobruisk	0	(0)
- * Club domestic league appearances and goals as of 28 December 2016

Denis Dechko (Belarusian: Дзяніс Дзячко; Russian: Денис Дечко; born 26 April 1990) is a Belarusian former footballer.

== Honours ==
Minsk

- Belarusian Cup winner: 2012–13

Dinamo Brest

- Belarusian Cup winner: 2016–17
