= Magal (song) =

In Nepal, and especially in the Far-Western Development Region, a magal (also mangal) is a song sung during special celebrations, such as marriages, the birth of a son (but not a daughter), pasni (first feeding of solid food to a baby). Magals are sung exclusively by older women of the group, called mungleri.
