= Syarhey Hihevich =

Belarusian footballer

Personal information
- Date of birth: 26 January 1987 (age 39)
- Place of birth: Barysaw, Minsk Oblast, Byelorussian SSR, Soviet Union
- Height: 1.77 m (5 ft 9 1/2 in)
- Position: Midfielder

Youth career
- 2002–2003: RUOR Minsk

Senior career*
Years	Team	Apps	(Gls)
2002–2003	RUOR Minsk	11	(1)
2004–2009	Dinamo Minsk	78	(9)
2010–2013	Minsk	68	(9)
2014	Isloch Minsk Raion	10	(0)
2014	Vitebsk	10	(1)
2015	Isloch Minsk Raion	5	(0)
2015	Smorgon	12	(0)
2016–2017	Orsha	36	(4)

International career
2005–2009	Belarus U21	18	(2)

Managerial career
- 2019: NFK Minsk (assistant)
- * Club domestic league appearances and goals

Syarhey Hihevich (Belarusian: Сяргей Гігевіч; Russian: Серге́й Гигевич; born 26 January 1987) is a Belarusian former professional footballer.

== Honours ==
Dinamo Minsk

- Belarusian Premier League champion: 2004

Minsk

- Belarusian Cup winner: 2012–13
