= Pavel Kasinets =

Belarusian footballer

Personal information
- Date of birth: 2 February 1989 (age 37)
- Place of birth: Orsha, Belarusian SSR
- Position: Forward

Youth career
- 2005–2007: Dinamo Minsk

Senior career*
Years	Team	Apps	(Gls)
2007–2009	Vitebsk	14	(1)
2010	Polotsk	9	(1)
2011	Orsha	12	(3)
2011–2012	Beltransgaz Slonim	46	(19)
2013	Slonim	8	(1)
2014	Orsha	1	(0)
2015–2019	Polotskgaz		
2020	Polotsk	2	(0)

International career
2009	Belarus U21	1	(0)
- * Club domestic league appearances and goals as of 31 December 2020

Pavel Kasinets (Belarusian: Павел Касінец; Russian: Павел Косинец; born 27 January 1988) is a Belarusian former professional footballer.
