= Yury Astravukh =

Belarusian footballer

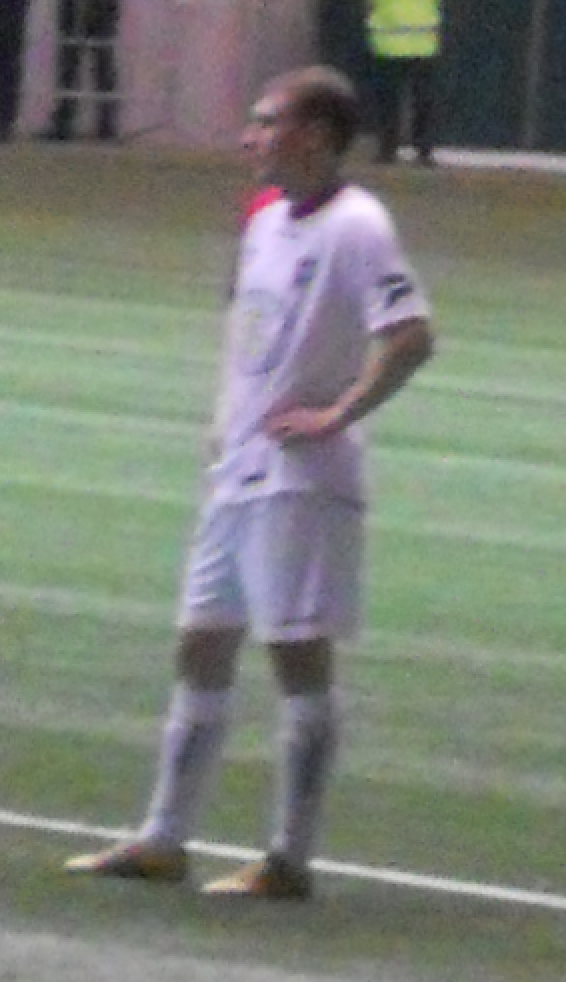

Personal information
- Date of birth: 21 January 1988 (age 38)
- Place of birth: Lida, Grodno Oblast, Belarusian SSR
- Height: 1.72 m (5 ft 8 in)
- Position: Defender

Youth career
- 2003–2004: Lida

Senior career*
Years	Team	Apps	(Gls)
2005	Lida	19	(1)
2006–2010	BATE Borisov	8	(0)
2008	→ Savit Mogilev (loan)	23	(0)
2009	→ Belshina Bobruisk (loan)	22	(0)
2010	→ Torpedo Zhodino (loan)	17	(0)
2011	Vedrich-97 Rechitsa	25	(1)
2012–2015	Minsk	103	(8)
2016–2018	Dinamo Minsk	47	(0)
2018–2021	Minsk	47	(0)
2022–2023	Slutsk	26	(1)

International career
2009–2011	Belarus U21	12	(0)
- * Club domestic league appearances and goals as of 31 December 2022

Yury Astravukh (Belarusian: Юрый Астравух; Russian: Юрий Остроух; born 21 January 1988) is a Belarusian professional footballer who plays primarily as a defender.

== Honours ==
BATE Borisov

- Belarusian Premier League champion: 2007

Minsk

- Belarusian Cup winner: 2012–13
