= Vital Kibuk =

Belarusian footballer

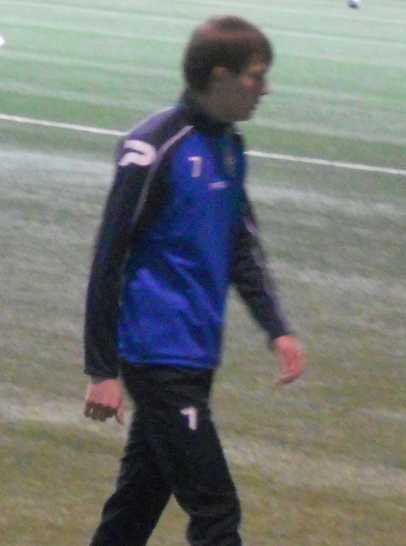
- Kibuk Vitaly (FC Minsk) in Belarusian Super Cup 2014, March 15, 2014

Personal information
- Date of birth: 7 January 1989 (age 37)
- Place of birth: Pinsk, Byelorussian SSR, Soviet Union
- Height: 1.78 m (5 ft 10 in)
- Position: Winger

Team information
- Current team: Volna Pinsk
- Number: 15

Senior career*
Years	Team	Apps	(Gls)
2006–2010	Volna Pinsk	71	(16)
2010	Dinamo Brest	9	(2)
2011–2012	Dinamo Minsk	18	(1)
2013–2014	Minsk	54	(6)
2015	Torpedo-BelAZ Zhodino	15	(2)
2016	Granit Mikashevichi	14	(0)
2016–2019	Slutsk	82	(9)
2020–	Volna Pinsk	178	(47)

International career
2012	Belarus Olympic	3	(0)
- * Club domestic league appearances and goals as of 6 July 2026

Vital Kibuk (Belarusian: Віталь Кібук; Russian: Виталий Кибук; born 7 January 1989) is a Belarusian professional football player who plays for Volna Pinsk.

== Honours ==
Minsk

- Belarusian Cup winner: 2012–13

Torpedo-BelAZ Zhodino

- Belarusian Cup winner: 2015–16
