= Ucha Gogoladze =

Georgian footballer

Personal information
- Date of birth: 2 May 1990 (age 36)
- Place of birth: Tbilisi, Georgia
- Height: 1.72 m (5 ft 7 1/2 in)
- Position: Striker

Senior career*
Years	Team	Apps	(Gls)
2007–2008	Borjomi	1	(0)
2008–2009	Hereti Lagodekhi	2	(0)
2009–2010	Tianeti	9	(4)
2010–2013	Dinamo Brest	56	(10)
2014	Banants	14	(3)
2014	Slutsk	11	(0)
2016	Algeti Marneuli	15	(4)
- * Club domestic league appearances and goals as of 31 December 2016

Ucha Gogoladze (born 2 May 1990) is a Georgian former professional football player.
