= Ilya Trachynski =

Belarusian footballer

Personal information
- Date of birth: 29 May 1989 (age 37)
- Place of birth: Minsk, Belarusian SSR
- Height: 1.85 m (6 ft 1 in)
- Position: Midfielder

Youth career
- 2007–2009: Shakhtyor Soligorsk

Senior career*
Years	Team	Apps	(Gls)
2009–2010	Shakhtyor Soligorsk	0	(0)
2009	→ Volna Pinsk (loan)	10	(0)
2011–2012	Vitebsk	32	(5)
2013	Isloch Minsk Raion	23	(2)
2014	Smolevichi-STI	28	(4)
2015	Utenis Utena	26	(2)
2016	Šilas Kazlų Rūda	28	(4)
2017	Slutsk	9	(1)
2017	Orsha	12	(3)
2018	Granit Mikashevichi	26	(2)
2019	NFK Minsk	11	(2)
2019	Slonim-2017	12	(3)
2020–2023	Maxline Vitebsk	88	(40)

International career
2009	Belarus U21	1	(0)
- * Club domestic league appearances and goals as of 31 December 2023

Ilya Trachynski (Belarusian: Ілья Трачынскі; Russian: Илья Трачинский; born 29 May 1989) is a Belarusian former professional footballer.
