= Serhiy Rozhok =

Ukrainian footballer (1985–2024)

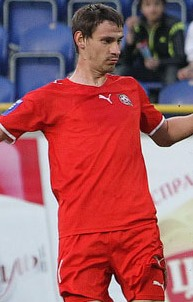
- Rozhok in 2011

Personal information
- Full name: Serhiy Volodymyrovych Rozhok
- Date of birth: 25 April 1985
- Place of birth: Slavutych, Kyiv Oblast, Ukrainian SSR, Soviet Union
- Date of death: 24 January 2024 (aged 38)
- Place of death: near Dibrova, Luhansk Oblast, Ukraine
- Height: 1.82 m (6 ft 0 in)
- Position: Midfielder

Youth career
- 1999–2000: Slavutych
- 2000–2002: Dynamo Kyiv

Senior career*
Years	Team	Apps	(Gls)
2001–2004	Dynamo-3 Kyiv	36	(7)
2002–2005	Dynamo-2 Kyiv	57	(2)
2005	Tavriya Simferopol	1	(0)
2005	Zakarpattia Uzhhorod	10	(0)
2006	CSKA Kyiv	32	(4)
2007	Kharkiv	7	(0)
2007	CSKA Kyiv	17	(0)
2007–2008	Desna Chernihiv	2	(0)
2008–2010	Obolon Kyiv	55	(10)
2010–2011	Kryvbas Kryvyi Rih	20	(0)
2011	Chornomorets Odesa	1	(0)
2012–2013	Minsk	51	(4)
2014	Zirka Kirovohrad	14	(0)
2015	Belshina Bobruisk	24	(8)
2016	Neman Grodno	10	(8)
2017	Vitebsk	8	(0)
2017	Gomel	13	(1)
2018	Smolevichi	22	(0)
2019	Mezhyhirya Novi Petrivtsi		
2020–2021	Juniors Shpytky		
2022–2023	Shturm Ivankiv		

International career
2000	Ukraine U16	5	(0)
2001–2002	Ukraine U17	3	(0)
2005	Ukraine U20	4	(0)
2003–2004	Ukraine U21	9	(2)
Medal record
Men's football
Representing Ukraine
UEFA European Under-19 Championship
Bronze medal – third place	2004 Switzerland
- * Club domestic league appearances and goals

Serhiy Volodymyrovych Rozhok (Ukrainian: Сергій Володимирович Рожок; 25 April 1985 – 24 January 2024) was a Ukrainian professional footballer who played as a midfielder.

== Career ==
After leaving Smolevichi at the end of the 2018 season, Rozhok played for Ukrainian amateur teams in Kyiv Oblast league.

Rozhok represented Ukraine internationally at 2004 UEFA European Under-19 Championship and 2005 FIFA World Youth Championship.

== Military career and death ==
During the full-scale Russian invasion of Ukraine, Rozhok joined the Ukrainian Army. He died during a combat mission on 24 January 2024, at the age of 38.

== See also ==
- List of Ukrainian sports figures killed during the Russo-Ukrainian war
