= Maksim Vitus =

Belarusian footballer

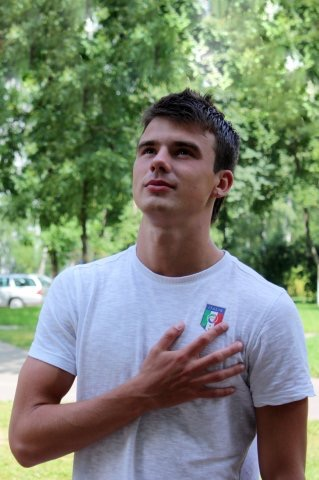

Personal information
- Full name: Maksim Yuryevich Vitus
- Date of birth: 11 February 1989 (age 37)
- Place of birth: Vawkavysk, Belarusian SSR
- Height: 1.76 m (5 ft 9 1/2 in)
- Position: Defender

Youth career
- 2006–2008: MTZ-RIPO Minsk

Senior career*
Years	Team	Apps	(Gls)
2006	PMC Postavy	13	(0)
2008–2011	Partizan Minsk	59	(0)
2012–2014	Neman Grodno	79	(3)
2015	Dinamo Minsk	19	(0)
2016	RNK Split	22	(0)
2017–2020	Dinamo Brest	83	(0)

International career
2008–2010	Belarus U21	8	(0)
2011–2012	Belarus Olympic	5	(0)
- * Club domestic league appearances and goals as of 31 December 2020

Maksim Yuryevich Vitus (Belarusian: Максім Юр'евіч Вітус; Russian: Максим Юрьевич Витус; born 11 February 1989) is a Belarusian former professional footballer.

== Career ==
Born in Vawkavysk, Vitus made his Belarusian Premier League debut with MTZ-RIPO in 2008.

== Honours ==
Dinamo Brest

- Belarusian Premier League champion: 2019
- Belarusian Cup winner: 2016–17, 2017–18
- Belarusian Super Cup winner: 2018, 2019, 2020
