= Denis Shcherbitsky =

Belarusian footballer (born 1996)

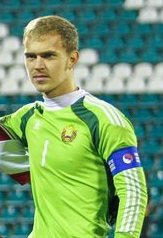

Personal information
- Full name: Denis Nikolayevich Shcherbitsky
- Date of birth: 14 April 1996 (age 30)
- Place of birth: Minsk, Belarus
- Height: 1.99 m (6 ft 6 1/2 in)
- Position: Goalkeeper

Youth career
- 2013–2016: BATE Borisov

Senior career*
Years	Team	Apps	(Gls)
2016–2023	BATE Borisov	80	(0)
2023–2025	Ural Yekaterinburg	3	(0)
2024	Ural-2 Yekaterinburg	1	(0)
2026	Leningradets	9	(0)

International career^{‡}
2015–2018	Belarus U21	16	(0)
2018	Belarus	1	(0)
- * Club domestic league appearances and goals as of 13 June 2026 ‡ National team caps and goals as of 15 October 2018

Denis Nikolayevich Shcherbitsky (Belarusian: Дзяніс Мікалаевіч Шчарбіцкі; Russian: Денис Николаевич Щербицкий; born 14 April 1996) is a Belarusian professional footballer.

== Club career ==
On 19 January 2024, Shcherbitsky extended his contract with Ural Yekaterinburg.

== Honours ==
BATE Borisov

- Belarusian Premier League champion: 2016, 2017, 2018
- Belarusian Cup winner: 2019–20, 2020–21
- Belarusian Super Cup winner: 2017, 2018

== Career statistics ==
As of 1 June 2024

Club	Season	League			Cup		Continental		Other		Total	
Club	Season	Division	Apps	Goals	Apps	Goals	Apps	Goals	Apps	Goals	Apps	Goals
BATE Borisov	2015	Belarusian Premier League	0	0	0	0	–		–		0	0
BATE Borisov	2016	Belarusian Premier League	5	0	0	0	0	0	–		5	0
BATE Borisov	2017	Belarusian Premier League	23	0	3	0	12 (Note: Four appearances in the UEFA Champions League, eight appearances in the UEFA Europa League)	0	0	0	38	0
BATE Borisov	2018	Belarusian Premier League	26	0	5	0	12 (Note: Six appearances in the UEFA Champions League, six appearances in the UEFA Europa League)	0	1 (Note: Appearances in the Belarusian Super Cup)	0	44	0
BATE Borisov	2019	Belarusian Premier League	10	0	0	0	2 (Note: Appearances in the UEFA Europa League)	0	–		12	0
BATE Borisov	2020	Belarusian Premier League	14	0	2	0	1	0	–		17	0
BATE Borisov	2021	Belarusian Premier League	0	0	0	0	0	0	–		0	0
BATE Borisov	2022	Belarusian Premier League	2	0	0	0	0	0	–		2	0
BATE Borisov	2023	Belarusian Premier League	0	0	0	0	–		–		0	0
BATE Borisov	Total		80	0	10	0	27	0	1	0	118	0
Ural Yekaterinburg	2023–24	Russian Premier League	0	0	0	0	–		0	0	0	0
Career total			80	0	10	0	27	0	1	0	118	0
