= Sergey Sosnovski =

Belarusian footballer

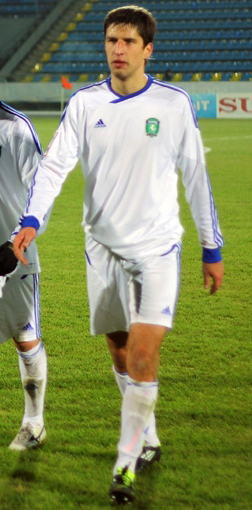

Personal information
- Full name: Sergey Anatolyevich Sosnovski
- Date of birth: 14 August 1981 (age 45)
- Place of birth: Minsk, Belarusian SSR
- Height: 1.90 m (6 ft 3 in)
- Position: Defender

Team information
- Current team: Minsk (assistant)

Youth career
- Zvezda-VA-BGU Minsk

Senior career*
Years	Team	Apps	(Gls)
2000–2001	Traktor Minsk	39	(2)
2002–2004	MTZ-RIPO Minsk	60	(1)
2005–2006	Zvezda-BGU Minsk	25	(2)
2006–2007	Neman Grodno	49	(4)
2008–2010	BATE Borisov	56	(1)
2011–2012	Tom Tomsk	22	(0)
2013	Minsk	30	(2)
2014	Torpedo-BelAZ Zhodino	1	(0)
2015–2016	Neman Grodno	44	(0)

International career
2002	Belarus U21	1	(0)
2009–2011	Belarus	17	(0)

Managerial career
- 2019–2021: Minsk (youth)
- 2022–: Minsk (assistant)
- 2022: Minsk (caretaker)
- * Club domestic league appearances and goals

Sergey Anatolyevich Sosnovski (Belarusian: Сяргей Сасноўскі (Syarhey Sasnowski); Russian: Серге́й Сосновский; born 14 August 1981) is a Belarusian football coach and former player (defender).

== Club career ==
Sosnovski was born in Minsk and signed his first professional contract with the local club Traktor Minsk. He played an important role in BATE Borisov's 2008–09 Champions League campaign, heading in a goal against Bulgarian Levski Sofia to open the scoring for FC BATE in the return leg of the third qualifying round played on 27 August 2008. The match ended in a 1–1 draw and the team from Barysaw became the first Belarusian club to reach the group stages of the Champions League. On 27 August 2009, Sosnovski scored two goals in a 4–0 win against Litex Lovech, which helped BATE to qualify for the group stage of the UEFA Europa League. In February 2011, Sosnovski ended his stint with BATE and signed a contract with Russian side FC Tom Tomsk.

== International career ==
He made his international debut for Belarus on 1 April 2009, playing the full 90 minutes in a World Cup qualifier against Kazakhstan.

== Honours ==
MTZ-RIPO Minsk

- Belarusian Cup winner: 2004–05

BATE Borisov

- Belarusian Premier League champion: 2008, 2009, 2010
- Belarusian Cup winner: 2009–10
- Belarusian Super Cup winner: 2010

Minsk

- Belarusian Cup winner: 2012–13
