= Ihar Khaladkow =

Belarusian footballer

Personal information
- Date of birth: 19 April 1991 (age 35)
- Position: Forward

Youth career
- 2007–2009: Vitebsk

Senior career*
Years	Team	Apps	(Gls)
2009–2011	Vitebsk	17	(4)
2012–2013	Polotsk	38	(10)
2013–2014	Vitebsk	15	(1)
2014	→ Vitebsk-2	9	(2)
2014–2016	Slonim	61	(8)
2017	Smorgon	13	(0)
2017–2018	Naftan Novopolotsk	40	(1)
2019	Slonim-2017	10	(1)
- * Club domestic league appearances and goals as of 31 December 2019

Ihar Khaladkow (Belarusian: Ігар Халадкоў; Russian: Игорь Холодков; born 19 April 1991) is a Belarusian former professional football player.

In 2020, Khaladkow was found guilty of being involved in a match-fixing schema in Belarusian football. He was sentenced to one year of community service and banned from Belarusian football for one year.
