= Roman Begunov =

Belarusian footballer

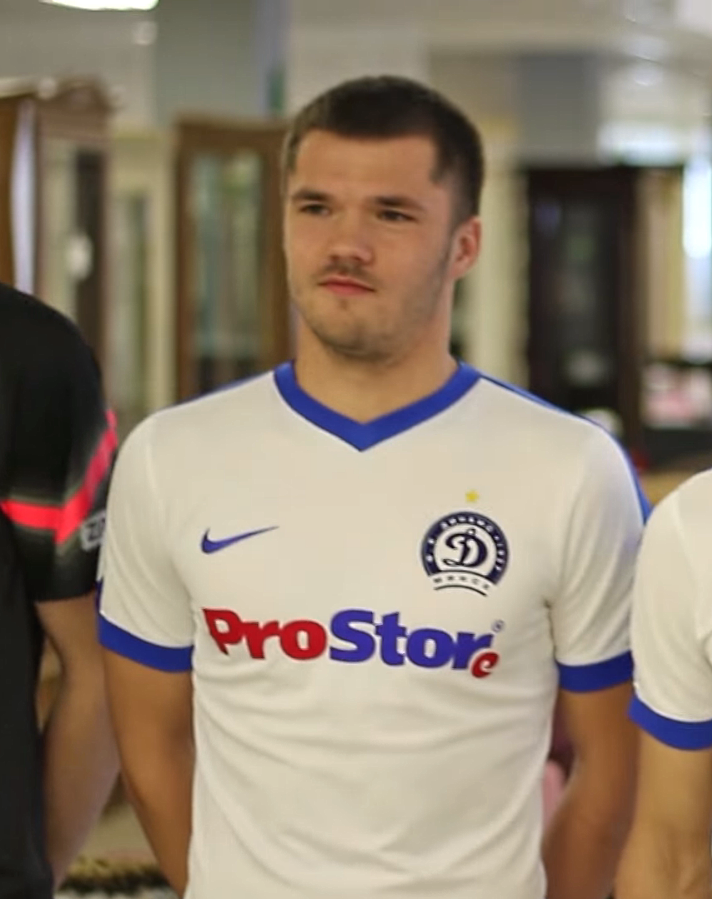
- Begunov in 2016

Personal information
- Full name: Roman Igorevich Begunov
- Date of birth: 22 March 1993 (age 33)
- Place of birth: Minsk, Belarus
- Height: 1.81 m (5 ft 11 in)
- Position: Defender

Team information
- Current team: Dinamo Minsk
- Number: 67

Youth career
- 2010–2011: Minsk

Senior career*
Years	Team	Apps	(Gls)
2011–2015	Minsk	87	(4)
2015–2018	Dinamo Minsk	65	(2)
2019	Torpedo-BelAZ Zhodino	11	(0)
2020–2021	Shakhtyor Soligorsk	32	(4)
2022–	Dinamo Minsk	96	(9)

International career^{‡}
2012–2013	Belarus U21	3	(0)
2016–2022	Belarus	9	(0)
- * Club domestic league appearances and goals as of 4 July 2026 ‡ National team caps and goals as of 13 June 2022

Roman Igorevich Begunov (Belarusian: Раман Ігаравіч Бегуноў, romanized: Raman Iharavič Behunoŭ; Russian: Роман Игоревич Бегунов; born 22 March 1993) is a Belarusian footballer who plays for Dinamo Minsk.

== Honours ==
Minsk

- Belarusian Cup winner: 2012–13

Shakhtyor Soligorsk

- Belarusian Premier League champion: 2020, 2021
- Belarusian Super Cup winner: 2021
