= Artyom Bykov =

Belarusian footballer

Personal information
- Full name: Artyom Gennadyevich Bykov
- Date of birth: 19 October 1992 (age 34)
- Place of birth: Minsk, Belarus
- Height: 1.82 m (6 ft 0 in)
- Position: Midfielder

Team information
- Current team: Torpedo-BelAZ Zhodino
- Number: 7

Senior career*
Years	Team	Apps	(Gls)
2009–2010	Zvezda-BGU Minsk	50	(6)
2011–2018	Dinamo Minsk	116	(10)
2012	→ Bereza-2010 (loan)	12	(2)
2015	→ Minsk (loan)	10	(1)
2018–2020	Dinamo Brest	46	(3)
2021–2024	Dinamo Minsk	88	(16)
2024–2025	Lamia	15	(0)
2025–2026	Dinamo Brest	23	(4)
2026–	Torpedo-BelAZ Zhodino	12	(5)

International career^{‡}
2012–2013	Belarus U21	17	(4)
2014–2023	Belarus	27	(1)
- * Club domestic league appearances and goals as of 3 July 2026 ‡ National team caps and goals as of 12 September 2023

Artyom Gennadyevich Bykov (Belarusian: Арцём Генадзьевіч Быкаў; Russian: Артём Геннадьевич Быков; born 19 October 1992) is a Belarusian professional footballer who plays as a midfielder for Torpedo-BelAZ Zhodino.

== International goal ==
Scores and results list Belarus' goal tally first.

No	Date	Venue	Opponent	Score	Result	Competition
1.	26 March 2022	Khalifa Sports City Stadium, Isa Town, Bahrain	India	1–0	3–0	Friendly

== Honours ==
Dinamo Brest

- Belarusian Premier League champion: 2019
- Belarusian Super Cup winner: 2019, 2020
