= Jakov Filipović =

Croatian footballer

Personal information
- Date of birth: 17 October 1992 (age 34)
- Place of birth: Pećnik, Bosnia and Herzegovina
- Height: 1.90 m (6 ft 3 in)
- Position: Centre back

Team information
- Current team: Gorica
- Number: 4

Youth career
- –2011: Osijek

Senior career*
Years	Team	Apps	(Gls)
2011–2014	BSK Bijelo Brdo	24	(2)
2014–2016	Cibalia	53	(6)
2016–2017	Inter Zaprešić	38	(5)
2017–2020	Lokeren	79	(1)
2020–2022	BATE Borisov	76	(5)
2023–2025	Beveren	51	(3)
2025–	Gorica	34	(2)

International career
2017	Croatia	3	(0)
- * Club domestic league appearances and goals as of 15 June 2026

Jakov Filipović (Croatian pronunciation: [jâkoʋ filǐːpoʋitɕ, - fǐli-]; born 17 October 1992) is a footballer who plays for Gorica as a defender. Born in Bosnia, he played for the Croatia national team.

== Club career ==
On 17 July 2025, Filipović signed a two-year contract with Gorica.

== International career ==
He made his debut for Croatia in a January 2017 friendly match against Chile and has earned a total of 3 caps, scoring no goals. His final international was a May 2017 friendly against Mexico.
