= Ivan Mahal =

Belarusian footballer

Personal information
- Date of birth: 7 January 1990 (age 36)
- Position: Defender

Youth career
- 2007–2008: Naftan Novopolotsk

Senior career*
Years	Team	Apps	(Gls)
2009–2011	Dnepr Mogilev	2	(0)
2012–2013	Polotsk	38	(1)
2013–2015	Orsha	38	(3)
2015	Spartak Shklov	8	(1)
2016	Orsha	25	(0)
2017	Osipovichi	0	(0)
2022–2023	Servolyuks Mezhisetki	32	(1)
- * Club domestic league appearances and goals as of 31 December 2023

Ivan Mahal (Belarusian: Іван Магаль; Russian: Иван Магаль; born 7 January 1990) is a Belarusian former professional football player.
