= Dzmitry Zinovich =

Belarusian footballer

Personal information
- Date of birth: 29 March 1995 (age 31)
- Place of birth: Minsk, Belarus
- Height: 1.95 m (6 ft 5 in)
- Position: Defender

Team information
- Current team: Unixlabs Minsk
- Number: 22

Youth career
- 2012–2014: Minsk

Senior career*
Years	Team	Apps	(Gls)
2014–2020	Minsk	60	(2)
2016	→ Dinamo Brest (loan)	9	(0)
2016	→ Belshina Bobruisk (loan)	11	(1)
2021	Isloch Minsk Raion	15	(0)
2022	Belshina Bobruisk	21	(2)
2023	Dinamo Brest	16	(0)
2024	Lada Tolyatti	24	(3)
2025	OshMU Aldier	10	(0)
2025	Kyrgyzaltyn	12	(0)
2026–	Unixlabs Minsk	6	(0)

International career^{‡}
2013	Belarus U19	2	(0)
2014–2016	Belarus U21	13	(0)
2017	Belarus B	1	(0)
- * Club domestic league appearances and goals as of 6 July 2026 ‡ National team caps and goals as of 14 July 2017

Dzmitry Zinovich (Belarusian: Дзмiтры Зiнович; Russian: Дмитрий Зинович; born 29 March 1995) is a Belarusian footballer.

His brother Kirill Zinovich is also a professional footballer.

== Honours ==
Dinamo Brest

- Belarusian Cup winner: 2016–17
