= Dzmitry Shchagrykovich =

Belarusian footballer and coach

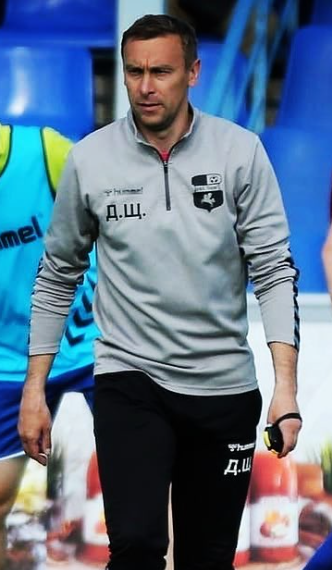

Personal information
- Date of birth: 7 December 1983 (age 42)
- Place of birth: Soligorsk, Belarusian SSR
- Height: 1.79 m (5 ft 10 1/2 in)
- Position: Midfielder

Team information
- Current team: Slutsk (assistant coach)

Youth career
- 2001–2002: Shakhtyor Soligorsk

Senior career*
Years	Team	Apps	(Gls)
2003–2004	BATE Borisov	25	(2)
2005–2009	MTZ-RIPO Minsk	120	(2)
2010	Belshina Bobruisk	31	(2)
2011	Minsk	32	(1)
2012–2015	Torpedo-BelAZ Zhodino	101	(6)
2016–2017	Slutsk	40	(1)
2018	Belshina Bobruisk	23	(1)
2019–2020	Smolevichi	33	(1)
2021–2023	Spartak Slutsk	12	(0)

International career^{‡}
2004–2005	Belarus U21	11	(0)
2009	Belarus B	1	(0)

Managerial career
- 2020–: Slutsk (assistant)
- * Club domestic league appearances and goals as of 31 December 2023 ‡ National team caps and goals as of 5 September 2010

Dzmitry Shchagrykovich (Belarusian: Дзмітрый Шчагрыковіч; Russian: Дмитрий Щегрикович; born 7 December 1983) is a Belarusian professional football coach and former player.

== Career ==
On 13 November 2009, Shchagrykovich made his international debut for Belarus B team, playing the full 90 minutes in the 1–2 away loss to Saudi Arabia B team in a friendly match.

His cousin Syarhey Shchehrykovich is also a professional footballer.

== Honours ==
MTZ-RIPO Minsk

- Belarusian Cup winner: 2004–05, 2007–08

Torpedo-BelAZ Zhodino

- Belarusian Cup winner: 2015–16
