= Yury Valavik =

Belarusian footballer

Personal information
- Date of birth: 19 June 1993 (age 33)
- Place of birth: Logoisk, Minsk Oblast, Belarus
- Height: 1.76 m (5 ft 9 1/2 in)
- Position: Midfielder

Youth career
- 2007–2010: Dinamo Minsk

Senior career*
Years	Team	Apps	(Gls)
2010–2015	Dinamo Minsk	2	(0)
2012–2014	→ Bereza-2010 (loan)	64	(3)
2015	→ Gorodeya (loan)	24	(1)
2016–2020	Gorodeya	98	(0)
2021–2022	Belshina Bobruisk	26	(1)
2023	Maxline Vitebsk	12	(1)
2023	Molodechno	6	(0)
2024–2025	Ostrovets	52	(2)

International career^{‡}
2012–2013	Belarus U21	11	(0)
- * Club domestic league appearances and goals as of 8 April 2026 ‡ National team caps and goals as of 5 November 2014

Yury Valavik (Belarusian: Юрый Валавік; Russian: Юрий Воловик; born 19 June 1993) is a Belarusian professional football player.
