= Yegor Semyonov =

Belarusian footballer

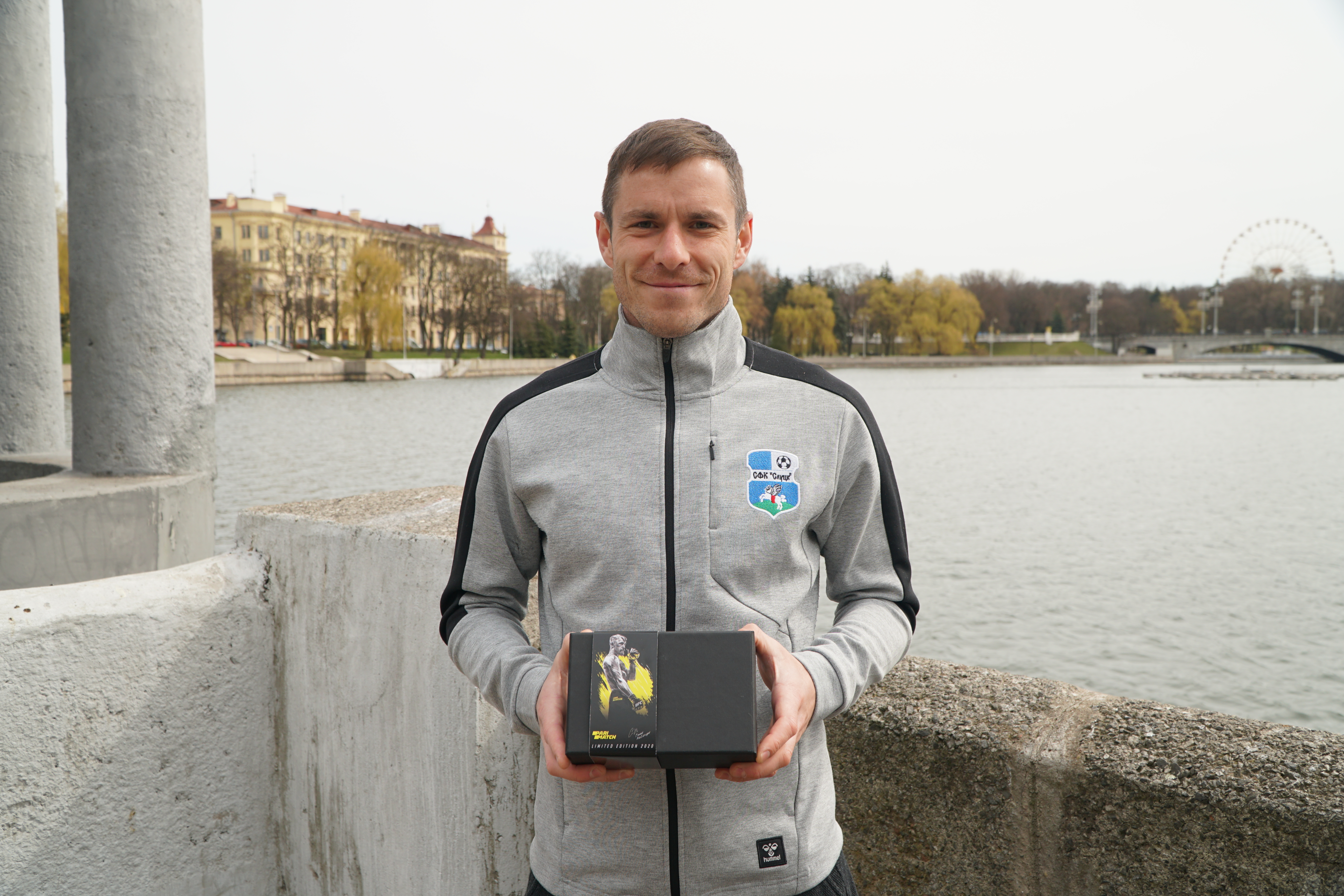

Personal information
- Full name: Yegor Valeryevich Semyonov
- Date of birth: 6 January 1988 (age 38)
- Place of birth: Minsk, Belarusian SSR
- Height: 1.73 m (5 ft 8 in)
- Position: Defender

Team information
- Current team: Unixlabs Minsk
- Number: 10

Youth career
- 2004–2005: Smena Minsk
- 2006: Minsk

Senior career*
Years	Team	Apps	(Gls)
2005	Smena-2 Minsk	10	(0)
2010	Vigvam Smolevichi	32	(12)
2011	Klechesk Kletsk	30	(5)
2012–2013	Smorgon	47	(9)
2014–2015	Smolevichi-STI	58	(14)
2016–2017	Krumkachy Minsk	32	(1)
2017–2018	Luch Minsk	39	(7)
2019–2021	Slutsk	75	(5)
2022	Smorgon	24	(4)
2023–2025	Ostrovets	66	(10)
2026–	Unixlabs Minsk	10	(1)
- * Club domestic league appearances and goals as of 6 July 2026

Yegor Valeryevich Semyonov (Belarusian: Ягор Валер'евіч Сямёнаў; Russian: Егор Валерьевич Семёнов; born 6 January 1988) is a Belarusian professional footballer who plays for Unixlabs Minsk.

He suspended his career during 2006–2009 due to health issues, but later recovered.
