= Ihar Makaraw =

Belarusian footballer (born 1985)

Personal information
- Date of birth: 26 February 1985 (age 41)
- Place of birth: Minsk, Belarusian SSR
- Height: 1.70 m (5 ft 7 in)
- Position: Midfielder

Youth career
- 2003–2005: Smena Minsk

Senior career*
Years	Team	Apps	(Gls)
2003–2005	Smena Minsk	56	(6)
2006–2010	Minsk	88	(13)
2010	Vitebsk	4	(0)
2011–2013	Slutsk	84	(22)
2014	Minsk-2	13	(1)
2015	Gorodeya	23	(1)
2016	Luch Minsk	16	(4)
2017	Neman-Agro Stolbtsy	9	(1)
2017	Molodechno-DYuSSh-4	13	(2)
2018	Krumkachy Minsk	26	(4)
2019	Slonim-2017	8	(0)
2019	Lida	12	(0)
2020	Dnepr Rogachev	4	(1)
2021	Viktoryja Marjina Horka	9	(0)
- * Club domestic league appearances and goals as of 31 December 2021

Ihar Makaraw (Belarusian: Ігар Макараў; Russian: Игорь Макаров; born 26 February 1985) is a Belarusian professional footballer.
