= Dmitry Usachev =

Belarusian footballer

Personal information
- Date of birth: 20 February 1988 (age 38)
- Place of birth: Belarus
- Height: 1.94 m (6 ft 4 in)
- Position: Defender

Youth career
- 2006–2008: Vitebsk

Senior career*
Years	Team	Apps	(Gls)
2008–2009	Vitebsk	0	(0)
2009	→ Slavia Mozyr (loan)	14	(1)
2010	DSK Gomel	7	(0)
2011–2012	Slavia Mozyr	37	(6)
2013	Granit Mikashevichi	23	(4)
2014	Vitebsk	26	(3)
2015–2016	Orsha	36	(3)
- * Club domestic league appearances and goals as of 31 December 2016

Dmitry Usachev (Belarusian: Дзмiтры Усачоў; Russian: Дмитрий Усачёв; born 20 February 1988 is a Belarusian former footballer.
