= Football Manege (Minsk) =

Sports venue in Minsk, Belarus

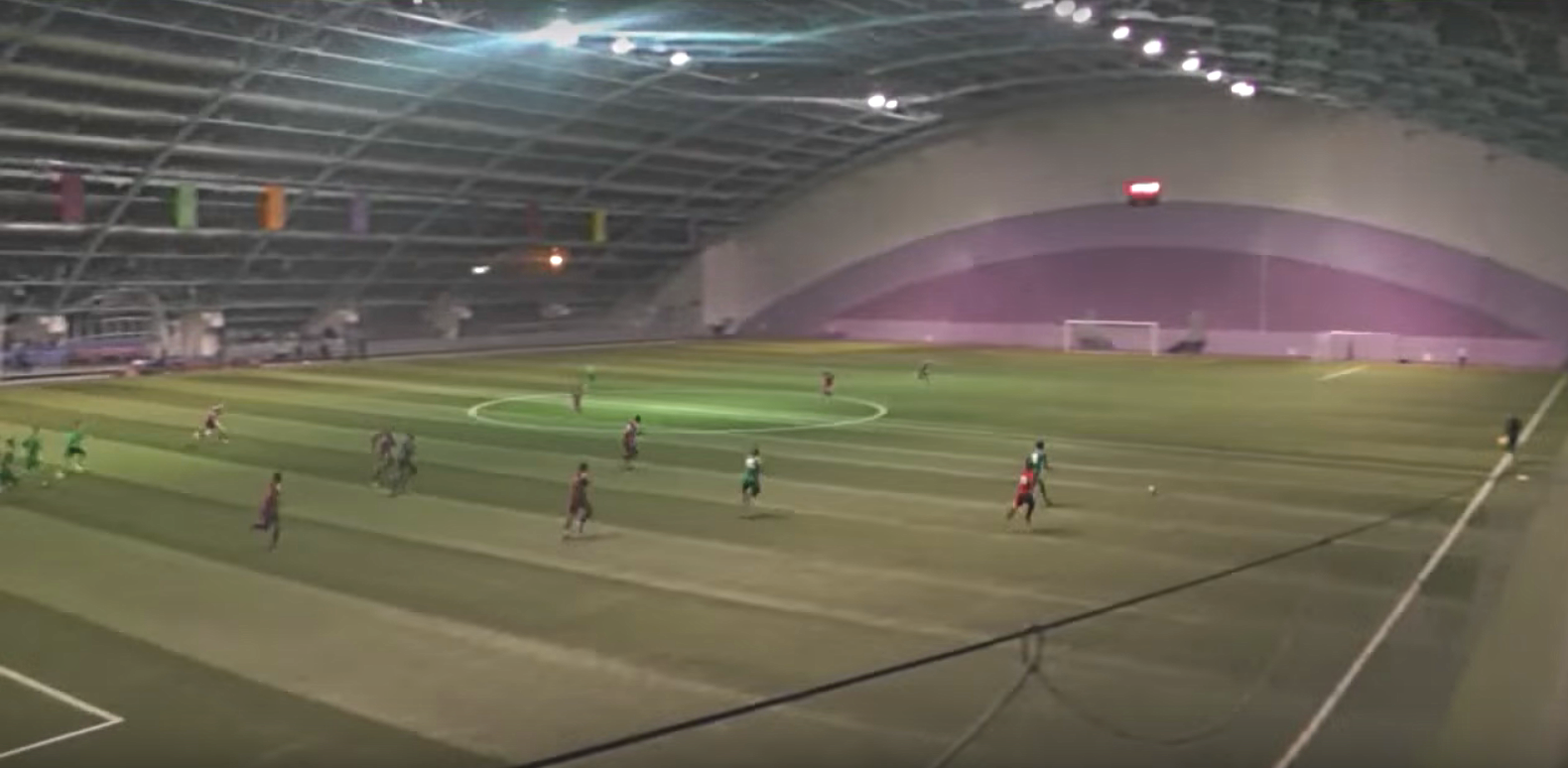
- Interactive map of Football Manege
- Location: Minsk, Belarus
- Coordinates: 53.9336111°N 27.5088889°E
- Owner: City of Minsk
- Capacity: 3,000
- Surface: Artificial turf

Construction
- Opened: 2002

Football Manege (Belarusian: Футбольны манеж, romanized: Futbol'ny manyezh) is a multi-use indoor arena in Minsk, Belarus. It is mostly used for football matches as well as for tennis competitions. The Manege holds 3,000 people and was opened in December 2002.

== Football use ==
Minsk Football Manege is frequently used by Belarusian football teams during post- and pre-season months in winter (mostly from December until March) for practice and friendly matches. Recently it has been used by some teams as home venue for Belarusian Cup games as well as for Belarusian Super Cup games that are played in February and March.

== Tennis use ==
Football Manege has found its use by Belarus Davis Cup team on a numerous occasions as a home venue for tennis matches in World Group and Group One Euro/African Zone of Davis Cup.
