= Uladzimir Zhuraw =

Belarusian footballer

Personal information
- Date of birth: 9 March 1991 (age 35)
- Place of birth: Mogilev, Belarusian SSR, Soviet Union
- Height: 1.86 m (6 ft 1 in)
- Position: Goalkeeper

Youth career
- 2008–2010: Dnepr Mogilev

Senior career*
Years	Team	Apps	(Gls)
2010–2015	Dnepr Mogilev	32	(0)
2012–2013	→ Polotsk (loan)	34	(0)
2013	→ Naftan Novopolotsk (loan)	1	(0)
2016–2018	Neman Grodno	34	(0)
2019	Vitebsk	5	(0)
2020–2023	Dnepr Mogilev	80	(0)
- * Club domestic league appearances and goals as of 31 July 2023

Uladzimir Zhuraw (Belarusian: Уладзімір Жураў; Russian: Владимир Журов; born 9 March 1991) is a Belarusian professional footballer.
