= 2013–14 Belarusian Cup =

Tournament details
- Country: Belarus
- Teams: 45

Final positions
- Champions: Shakhtyor Soligorsk (2nd title)
- Runners-up: Neman Grodno

Tournament statistics
- Matches played: 43
- Goals scored: 164 (3.81 per match)
- Top goal scorer(s): Pavel Savitskiy (5 goals)

The 2013–14 Belarusian Cup was the 23rd season of the Belarusian annual cup competition. Contrary to the league season, the competition has been conducted in a fall-spring rhythm. The first games were played on 29 May 2013 and the final on 3 May 2014. Shakhtyor Soligorsk won of the Cup and qualified for the second qualifying round of the 2014–15 UEFA Europa League.

== Participating clubs ==
The following teams took part in the competition:

2013 Belarusian Premier League all teams	2013 Belarusian First League; 15 teams (of 16)	2013 Belarusian Second League; 12 teams (of 13)	Winners of regional cups 6 teams
BATE Borisov; Shakhtyor Soligorsk; Dinamo Minsk; Gomel; Neman Grodno; Minsk; Belshina Bobruisk; Dinamo Brest; Naftan Novopolotsk; Slavia Mozyr; Torpedo-BelAZ Zhodino; Dnepr Mogilev	Gorodeya; Vitebsk; SKVICH Minsk; Slutsk; Granit Mikashevichi; Vedrich-97 Rechitsa; Volna Pinsk; Bereza-2010; Smorgon; Lida; Polotsk; Khimik Svetlogorsk; Smolevichi-STI; Slonim; Isloch Minsk Raion	Gomelzheldortrans; Zvezda-BGU Minsk; Zhlobin; Neman Mosty; Baranovichi; Livadiya Dzerzhinsk; Molodechno-2013; Orsha; Osipovichi; Partizan-MTZ Minsk; Kobrin; ALF-2007 Minsk	ALF-Legea Minsk (Minsk); Gomelsteklo Kostyukovka (Gomel Region); Gorki (Mogilev Region); Smolevichi (Minsk Region); Voronovo (Grodno Region); Zapadny (Brest Region)

1. Minsk-2 did not participate in this edition of the Cup.
2. Vitebsk-2 did not participate in this edition of the Cup.

== Preliminary round ==
In this round six winners of regional cups (amateur teams) played against six teams from the Second League. The draw was conducted on 21 May 2013. The matches were played on 29 May 2013.

29 May 2013	Smolevichi (A)	1–3	Orsha (III)	Smolevichi
17:00	Chikida 54'		Vowkaw 23'; Subbotin 61'; Znak 89'	Stadium: Ozyorny Stadium; Referee: Sergey Chistov (Minsk)

29 May 2013	ALF-Legea Minsk (A)	2–1	Molodechno-2013 (III)	Minsk
17:00	Trofimenko 31'; Hukayla 45' (pen.)		Tarchilo 6'	Stadium: BGATU Stadium; Referee: Nikolay Kurilovich (Bereza)

29 May 2013	Gomelsteklo Kostyukovka (A)	2–3	Partizan-MTZ Minsk (III)	Kostyukovka
18:00	Krainyukov 12'; Chekhovsky 47' (pen.)		Kazyuchits 49', 90'; Velisevich 67'	Stadium: Central Stadium; Referee: Valery Golomzik (Bobruisk)

29 May 2013	Voronovo (A)	0–9	Neman Mosty (III)	Voronovo
18:00			Zayats 8'; Shota 10'; Traskevich 16', 90'; Simonchik 21', 62'; Ravlushko 29'; Zhitko 76'; Akstilovich 84'	Stadium: City Stadium; Referee: Aleksey Obelevsky (Grodno)

29 May 2013	Gorki (A)	2–2 (a.e.t.) (1–4 p)	Zhlobin (III)	Gorki
18:30	Bubelev 21'; Kulikow 52'		Daineko 50'; Malinovsky 78'	Stadium: City Stadium; Referee: Vadim Erokho (Vitebsk)
	Penalties
	Mikhaylaw (penalty missed); Kalachow (penalty missed); Yefremov (penalty scored)		(penalty scored) Daineko; (penalty scored) Novitskiy; (penalty scored) Kosachuk; (penalty scored) Malinovsky

29 May 2013	Zapadny (A)	0–3	Kobrin (III)	Bolshiye Motykaly
19:00			Marchuk 35'; Savchuk 65' (pen.); Kuchinsky 82'	Stadium: City Stadium; Referee: Artur Kunai (Brest)

== First round ==
In this round six winners of preliminary round are joined by another six teams from Second League and 10 clubs from the First League.

Another five First League clubs were given a bye to the next round: Gorodeya, Volna Pinsk, Slutsk, Lida (top four clubs in the league table as of the draw date) and SKVICH Minsk (by drawing of lots). The reserve teams (Minsk-2 and Vitebsk-2) were not allowed to participate.

The draw was conducted on 30 May 2013. The matches were played on 12 June 2013.

12 June 2013	Baranovichi (III)	0–2	Gomelzheldortrans (III)	Baranovichi
17:00		Report	Dimitrov 42'; Fedorenko 72'	Stadium: Lokomotiv Stadium; Attendance: 300; Referee: Dmitry Dmitriev (Fanipol)

12 June 2013	Zvezda-BGU Minsk (III)	1–0	Khimik Svetlogorsk (II)	Minsk
17:00	Botyanovskiy 10'	Report		Stadium: RCOP-BGU Stadium; Attendance: 275; Referee: Dmitriy Digilevich (Zhodino)

12 June 2013	Orsha (III)	0–4	Smorgon (II)	Orsha
17:00		Report	Shapyatowski 32'; Litvinchuk 35'; Bondarenko 45+1'; Krot 78'	Stadium: Lokomotiv Stadium; Attendance: 850; Referee: Vadim Panchenko (Mogilev)

12 June 2013	Livadiya Dzerzhinsk (III)	0–5	Granit Mikashevichi (II)	Dzerzhinsk
18:00		Report	Kasmynin 21'; Stolik 32'; Kavalyonak 69'; Filinovich 76'; Hovavko 89'	Stadium: City Stadium; Attendance: 250; Referee: Oleg Cherepnev (Bobruisk)

12 June 2013	Osipovichi (III)	0–6	Smolevichi-STI (II)	Osipovichi
18:00		Report	Grechishko 2', 30', 38'; Korol 26'; Shcharbakow 50', 67'	Stadium: Yunost Stadium; Attendance: 150; Referee: Oleg Murashkevich (Novopolotsk)

12 June 2013	Zhlobin (III)	3–2	Isloch Minsk Raion (II)	Zhlobin
18:00	Novitskiy 53'; Melnikov 55'; Kurgkheli 71'	Report	Babakov 50'; Lapshin 58'	Stadium: Lokomotiv Stadium; Attendance: 250; Referee: Andrey Divakov (Mogilev)

12 June 2013	ALF-Legea Minsk (A)	1–11	Vedrich-97 Rechitsa (II)	Minsk
19:00	Naronskiy 84'	Report	Filippov 14', 40', 51'; Makar 29', 90'; Tolkachev 43'; Katlyaraw 49', 55', 75'; Drigalev 61'; Lavrenchuk 64'	Stadium: SOK "Olimpiyskiy" Stadium; Attendance: 100; Referee: Nikolay Kurilovich (Bereza)

12 June 2013	Neman Mosty (III)	1–1 (a.e.t.) (2–3 p)	Polotsk (II)	Mosty
19:00	Kozich 85' (pen.)	Report	Khaladkow 62' (pen.)	Stadium: Neman Stadium; Attendance: 500; Referee: Denis Ryzhakov (Marina Gorka)
	Penalties
	Shota (penalty scored); Bazey (penalty scored); Kuklevsky (penalty missed); Akstilovich (penalty missed); Kozich (penalty missed)		(penalty missed) Zhuraw; (penalty scored) Zubtsovsky; (penalty scored) Kruglov; (penalty scored) Tsvirko

12 June 2013	ALF-2007 Minsk (III)	0–3 (a.e.t.)	Slonim (II)	Minsk
19:00		Report	Kislyuk 96'; Zhegalo 116'; Luzhankov 118'	Stadium: BGATU Stadium; Attendance: 300; Referee: Vladimir Ishchenko (Rechitsa)

12 June 2013	Kobrin (III)	0–3	Bereza-2010 (II)	Kobrin
19:00		Report	Chepelevich 70' (o.g.); Tikhonovsky 78'; Sholudko 87'	Stadium: Yunost Stadium; Attendance: 1,000; Referee: Sergey Stetsurin (Brest)

12 June 2013	Partizan-MTZ Minsk (III)	(w/o)	Vitebsk (II)

1. Partizan-MTZ Minsk were awarded a technical loss after failing to provide a stadium to host a match.

== Second round ==
In this round eleven winners of the First Round are joined by another five teams from First League and 8 clubs from the Premier League.

The four Premier League clubs that qualified for 2013–14 European Cups (BATE Borisov, Minsk, Shakhtyor Soligorsk and Dinamo Minsk) were given a bye to the next round.

The draw was conducted on 17 June 2013. The matches were played on 27 and 28 July 2013.

27 July 2013	Slonim (II)	0–3	Dinamo Brest	Slonim
17:00		Report	Signevich 26'; Gogoladze 52'; Kendysh 85'	Stadium: Yunost Stadium; Attendance: 1,100; Referee: Dmitry Dmitriyev (Fanipol)

27 July 2013	Smolevichi-STI (II)	1–3	Belshina Bobruisk	Smolevichi
17:00	Zhdanok 49'	Report	Sorokin 18', 30'; Hawrushka 31'	Stadium: Ozyorny Stadium; Attendance: 700; Referee: Ivan Safaryan (Minsk)

27 July 2013	Granit Mikashevichi (II)	2–0	Naftan Novopolotsk	Luninets
18:00	Semyonov 60'; Ignatenko 77' (pen.)	Report		Stadium: Polesye Stadium; Attendance: 650; Referee: Dmitry Yevnevich (Minsk)

27 July 2013	Vedrich-97 Rechitsa (II)	0–3	Neman Grodno	Rechitsa
18:00		Report	Zubovich 48'; Savitskiy 55', 84'	Stadium: Central Stadium; Attendance: 1,100; Referee: Andrey Divakov (Mogilev)

27 July 2013	Bereza-2010 (II)	0–3	Gomel	Bereza
18:00		Report	Khlebosolov 7', 57'; Matsveenka 78'	Stadium: DYuSSh-1 Stadium; Attendance: 650; Referee: Nikita Pyreyev (Minsk)

27 July 2013	Vitebsk (II)	2–3	Gorodeya (II)	Vitebsk
18:00	Ivanow 77'; Grechikha 90+2'	Report	D. Lebedzew 48'; Zhevnerov 61' (o.g.); A. Lebedzew 80'	Stadium: Vitebsky CSK; Attendance: 1,500; Referee: Sergey Tsinkevich (Osipovichi)

28 July 2013	SKVICH Minsk (II)	0–3	Dnepr Mogilev	Minsk
12:00		Report	Kuhan 27'; Zyanko 45'; Shramchenko 52'	Stadium: SOK Olimpiysky; Attendance: 300; Referee: Denis Ryzhakov (Marina Gorka)

28 July 2013	Polotsk (II)	2–1	Volna Pinsk (II)	Polotsk
12:00	Plyasunow 42'; Zhigar 48'	Report	Kalpachuk 9'	Stadium: Spartak Stadium; Attendance: 100; Referee: Dmitry Digilevich (Zhodino)

28 July 2013	Torpedo-BelAZ Zhodino	3–0	Zvezda-BGU Minsk (III)	Zhodino
17:00	Shchagrykovich 16'; Yatskevich 62'; Miñano 71'	Report		Stadium: Torpedo Stadium; Attendance: 2,350; Referee: Oleg Murashkevich (Novopolotsk)

28 July 2013	Smorgon (II)	5–0	Lida (II)	Smorgon
18:00	Krot 13', 21', 67'; Ryndzyuk 75'; Zamara 79'	Report		Stadium: Yunost Stadium; Attendance: 1,200; Referee: Dmitry Dolya (Grodno)

28 July 2013	Gomelzheldortrans (III)	0–3	Slutsk (II)	Gomel
18:00		Report	Shakaw 10'; Gnedko 27'; Shibeko 58'	Stadium: SDYuSShOR-8 Stadium; Attendance: 300; Referee: Vadim Panchenko (Mogilev)

28 July 2013	Slavia Mozyr	4–0	Zhlobin (III)	Mozyr
18:00	Laptev 10', 43', 60' (pen.); Tsimashenka 51'	Report		Stadium: Yunost Stadium; Attendance: 1,000; Referee: Vladimir Ischenko (Rechitsa)

1. Match was moved to the opponent's ground after original draw per mutual agreement.

== Round of 16 ==
The draw was conducted on 29 July 2013. The matches will be played on 24 and 25 August 2013. The match involving Minsk was moved to 7 September due to team's participation in UEFA Europa League play-off round.

24 August 2013	Gorodeya (II)	3–1	Granit Mikashevichi (II)	Gorodeya
17:00	Gomza 38'; Markhel 65', 86' (pen.)	Report	Usachev 74'	Stadium: Gorodeya Stadium; Attendance: 450; Referee: Sergey Tsinkevich (Osipovichi)

24 August 2013	Belshina Bobruisk	2–0	Dinamo Minsk	Bobruisk
17:00	Hawrushka 33'; Dzemidovich 51'	Report		Stadium: Spartak Stadium; Attendance: 1,000; Referee: Vitaly Sevostyanik (Grodno)

24 August 2013	Slutsk (II)	0–1	Dnepr Mogilev	Slutsk
17:00		Report	Shramchenko 18'	Stadium: City Stadium; Attendance: 1,740; Referee: Ivan Safaryan (Minsk)

25 August 2013	BATE Borisov	7–0	Smorgon (II)	Borisov
17:00	Baha 1', 38'; Kontsevoy 5', 90'; M.Valadzko 14'; Mazalewski 67'; Krivets 69'	Report		Stadium: City Stadium; Attendance: 3,100; Referee: Oleg Murashkevich (Novopolotsk)

25 August 2013	Torpedo-BelAZ Zhodino	2–2 (a.e.t.) (1–3 p)	Shakhtyor Soligorsk	Zhodino
17:30	Hleb 51', 86' (pen.)	Report	Asipenka 38' (pen.); Balanovich 74'	Stadium: Torpedo Stadium; Attendance: 1,300; Referee: Igor Kruk (Molodechno)
	Penalties
	Lyavitski (penalty missed); Shchegrikovich (penalty missed); Miñano (penalty scored); Hleb (penalty missed)		(penalty scored) Kashewski; (penalty missed) Balanovich; (penalty scored) Sitko; (penalty scored) Asipenka

25 August 2013	Gomel	1–0	Slavia Mozyr	Gomel
19:00	Rudzik 8'	Report		Stadium: Central Stadium; Attendance: 4,100; Referee: Denis Scherbakov (Minsk)

25 August 2013	Neman Grodno	3–1	Dinamo Brest	Grodno
19:00	Lyavitski 11', 90+1'; Savitskiy 53'	Report	Signevich 72'	Stadium: Neman Stadium; Attendance: 1,500; Referee: Mikhail Lavsky (Gomel)

7 September 2013	Minsk	6–0	Polotsk (II)	Minsk
16:00	Makas 32', 45+1'; Kibuk 37'; Shumilov 48', 78'; Pushnyakov 73' (pen.)	Report		Stadium: Torpedo Stadium; Attendance: 100; Referee: Gennady Levchuk (Malorita)

== Quarterfinal ==
The draw was conducted on 16 September 2013. The matches were played on 22 March 2014.

22 March 2014	Minsk	3–1	Gorodeya (II)	Minsk
14:00	Kutsenko 24'; Mirić 26'; Pushnyakov 62'	Report	Chaley 18'	Stadium: KFP Minsk; Attendance: 600; Referee: Vadim Panchenko (Mogilev)

22 March 2014	Shakhtyor Soligorsk	3–1	Belshina Bobruisk	Soligorsk
16:00	Asipenka 25', 61'; Kashewski 45'	Report	Rodríguez 37'	Stadium: Shakhtyor Stadium; Attendance: 1,250; Referee: Denis Scherbakov (Minsk)

22 March 2014	Gomel	1–2	Dnepr Mogilev	Gomel
16:00	Kamarowski 79'	Report	Sazankow 23', 37'	Stadium: Central Stadium; Attendance: 3,150; Referee: Igor Kruk (Molodechno)

22 March 2014	Neman Grodno	2–1 (a.e.t.)	BATE Borisov	Grodno
16:00	Zubovich 73'; Tarasovs 100'	Report	Krivets 82' (pen.)	Stadium: Neman Stadium; Attendance: 3,500; Referee: Aleksei Kulbakov (Gomel)

== Semifinal ==
The draw was conducted on 24 March 2014. The matches were played 15 April 2014.

15 April 2014	Minsk	1–3	Neman Grodno	Minsk
16:30	Mirić 82'	Report	Savitskiy 55'; Khachaturyan 67', 80'	Stadium: Torpedo Stadium; Attendance: 500; Referee: Sergey Tsinkevich (Osipovichi)

15 April 2014	Dnepr Mogilev	1–3 (a.e.t.)	Shakhtyor Soligorsk	Mogilev
19:00	Tereshchenko 75'	Report	Starhorodskyi 55' (pen.); Asipenka 98'; Yanushkevich 104'	Stadium: Spartak Stadium; Attendance: 3,100; Referee: Oleg Cherepnev (Bobruisk)

== Final ==
The match was played on 3 May 2014. It was the first official match at the newly built Borisov Arena.

3 May 2014
19:00

Neman Grodno	0–1	Shakhtyor Soligorsk
	Report	Starhorodskyi 35'

Borisov Arena, Borisov
Attendance: 11,000
Referee: Sergey Tsinkevich (Osipovichi)

NEMAN:
GK	19	(Belarus) Alyaksandr Sulima
DF	5	(Belarus) Dzmitry Rawneyka	(yellow card) 42'
DF	18	(Belarus) Pavel Rybak	(yellow card) 85'
DF	20	(Belarus) Ivan Sadovnichiy
DF	14	(Belarus) Alyaksandr Anyukevich
MF	46	(Belarus) Alyaksey Lyahchylin		(substituted off) 82'
MF	32	(Latvia) Igors Tarasovs
MF	7	(Belarus) Andrey Khachaturyan
MF	9	(Belarus) Ivan Dzenisevich (c)		(substituted off) 66'
MF	88	(Belarus) Pavel Savitskiy
FW	21	(Latvia) Ģirts Karlsons		(substituted off) 54'
Substitutes:
GK	1	(Lithuania) Marius Rapalis
DF	4	(Belarus) Artsyom Rakhmanaw
FW	11	(Belarus) Dzmitry Kavalyonak		(substituted on) 82'
MF	13	(Serbia) Vladimir Veselinov
MF	15	(Belarus) Artsyom Salavey	(yellow card) 75'	(substituted on) 66'
FW	17	(Belarus) Yahor Zubovich		(substituted on) 54'
DF	23	(Belarus) Maksim Vitus
Manager:
(Belarus) Sergey Solodovnikov

SHAKHTYOR:
GK	1	(Estonia) Artur Kotenko
DF	3	(Belarus) Syarhey Matsveychyk
DF	5	(Belarus) Alyaksey Yanushkevich
DF	6	(Belarus) Mikalay Kashewski
DF	15	(Belarus) Alyaksandr Yurevich (c)
MF	16	(Belarus) Syarhey Balanovich
MF	11	(Ukraine) Artem Starhorodskyi		(substituted off) 56'
MF	7	(Belarus) Andrey Lyavonchyk	(yellow card) 45+1'
MF	77	(Belarus) Dzmitry Asipenka		(substituted off) 84'
MF	9	(Georgia (country)) Aleksandre Guruli		(substituted off) 64'
FW	10	(Belarus) Mikalay Yanush
Substitutes:
GK	18	(Belarus) Ruslan Kapantsow
MF	2	(Ukraine) Ilya Halyuza	(yellow card) 67'	(substituted on) 56'
MF	4	(Belarus) Andrey Tsevan
MF	17	(Belarus) Alyaksey Ryas		(substituted on) 64'
DF	19	(Belarus) Ihar Kuzmyanok		(substituted on) 84'
FW	20	(Belarus) Vladimir Yurchenko
FW	27	(Belarus) Filip Ivanow
Manager:
(Belarus) Sergei Borovsky

== See also ==
- 2013 Belarusian Premier League
- 2014 Belarusian Premier League
- 2013 Belarusian First League
