= 2013 Belarusian Premier League =

Belarusian Premier League
- Season: 2013
- Champions: BATE Borisov
- Relegated: Slavia Mozyr
- Champions League: BATE Borisov
- Europa League: Shakhtyor Soligorsk; Dinamo Minsk; Neman Grodno
- Matches: 180
- Goals: 413 (2.29 per match)
- Top goalscorer: Vitali Rodionov (14)
- Biggest home win: BATE 6–1 Slavia; Shakhtyor 5–0 Dinamo Br
- Biggest away win: Naftan 1–5 BATE; Dnepr 0–4 Torpedo; Belshina 0–4 Dinamo Br; Dnepr 1–5 Belshina
- Highest scoring: BATE 6–1 Slavia (7 goals)

The 2013 Belarusian Premier League was the 23rd season of top-tier football in Belarus. It began in April 2013 and ended in November 2013. BATE Borisov are the defending champions, having won their 9th league title the previous year.

== Format change ==
Starting with this season, the league will be played in two phases. The first phase will consist of a regular double-round robin tournament between 12 teams. The best six teams will qualify for the championship round, which will determine the champions and the participants for the 2014–15 European competitions. The remaining six teams play in the relegation group, where the top four teams will secure places in the 2014 competition, the fifth team (11th overall) will play a two-legged relegation play-off against the runners-up of the First League, and the sixth team (12th overall) will be automatically relegated. All points collected during the first phase will count for the second phase as well.

== Teams ==
Locations of teams in the 2013 Belarusian Premier League

No teams were relegated to the First League after the 2012 season since the number of teams was shortened from 12 to 11 at the last moment in early 2012. Dnepr Mogilev, the champions of 2012 First League, were promoted to the Premier League after 1 season's absence.

Torpedo-BelAZ Zhodino, as the 11th-placed team in the 2012 Premier League, had to compete in the relegation/promotion playoffs against First League runners-up Gorodeya. Torpedo-BelAZ Zhodino won the playoff, 4–1 on aggregate, and both teams retained positions in their respective leagues.

Brest reverted their name back to Dinamo Brest a week before the start of the season.

=== Team summaries ===
Team	Location	Venue	Capacity	Position in 2012
BATE	Borisov	City Stadium	5,402	1
Belshina	Bobruisk	Spartak Stadium (Bobruisk)	3,700	7
Dinamo Brest	Brest	OSK Brestskiy	10,162	8
Dinamo Minsk	Minsk	Traktor Stadium	17,600	3
Dnepr	Mogilev	Spartak Stadium (Mogilev)	7,350	First League, 1
Gomel	Gomel	Central Stadium	14,307	4
Minsk	Minsk	Torpedo Stadium (Minsk)	1,600	6
Naftan	Novopolotsk	Atlant Stadium	4,500	9
Neman	Grodno	Neman Stadium	8,500	5
Shakhtyor	Soligorsk	Stroitel Stadium	4,200	2
Slavia Mozyr	Mozyr	Yunost Stadium	5,353	10
Torpedo-BelAZ	Zhodino	Torpedo Stadium (Zhodino)	6,524	11

1. Four games played at Torpedo Stadium in Zhodino.
2. Two games played at KFP Minsk in Minsk and one game at Spartak Stadium in Mogilev.
3. Two games played at Yunost Stadium in Brest.
4. Two games played at KFP Minsk.
5. One game played at SDYuSShOR-8 Stadium.
6. Four games played at KFP Minsk.
7. One game played at Shakhtyor Stadium.
8. Three games played at City Stadium in Khoiniki.

== First phase ==
=== League table ===
Pos	Team	Pld	W	D	L	GF	GA	GD	Pts	Qualification
1	Shakhtyor Soligorsk	22	15	4	3	35	13	+22	49	Qualification for championship round
2	BATE Borisov	22	15	3	4	46	17	+29	48	Qualification for championship round
3	Dinamo Minsk	22	9	7	6	30	26	+4	34 (Note: Dinamo Minsk placed above Gomel by better head-to-head record (1–0, 2–1).)	Qualification for championship round
4	Gomel	22	9	7	6	25	20	+5	34	Qualification for championship round
5	Neman Grodno	22	8	6	8	23	23	0	30	Qualification for championship round
6	Torpedo-BelAZ Zhodino	22	8	4	10	26	28	−2	28	Qualification for championship round
7	Belshina Bobruisk	22	7	7	8	24	28	−4	28	Qualification for relegation group
8	Minsk	22	6	7	9	21	27	−6	25	Qualification for relegation group
9	Dinamo Brest	22	6	6	10	18	30	−12	24	Qualification for relegation group
10	Dnepr Mogilev	22	6	5	11	20	29	−9	23	Qualification for relegation group
11	Naftan Novopolotsk	22	4	9	9	19	29	−10	21	Qualification for relegation group
12	Slavia Mozyr	22	3	7	12	16	33	−17	16	Qualification for relegation group

Source: football.by
Rules for classification: 1st points; 2nd matches won; 3rd head-to-head (points, matches won, goal difference, goals scored); 4th goal difference; 5th goals scored

=== Results ===
Each team will play twice against every other team for a total of 22 matches.

Home \ Away	BAT	BSH	DBR	DMI	DNE	GOM	MIN	NAF	NEM	SHA	SLA	TZH
BATE Borisov		2–0	3–2	1–1	3–1	1–2	2–1	3–0	2–0	4–0	6–1	2–0
Belshina Bobruisk	0–1		1–0	1–1	3–1	1–1	0–0	1–0	2–2	1–1	2–2	1–3
Dinamo Brest	0–0	1–0		0–2	2–0	1–1	1–1	2–1	1–1	0–1	1–0	2–1
Dinamo Minsk	1–2	2–0	3–2		2–1	1–0	3–0	1–1	0–2	1–1	0–0	1–2
Dnepr Mogilev	2–1	0–1	0–0	2–0		2–1	2–2	1–2	3–1	2–0	1–0	0–4
Gomel	3–2	1–3	2–0	1–2	0–0		2–0	1–1	2–0	0–1	2–1	0–0
Minsk	0–1	2–1	2–0	1–2	1–0	0–0		1–2	1–0	0–1	1–1	0–0
Naftan Novopolotsk	1–5	3–3	1–2	0–0	2–1	0–0	1–1		0–0	0–1	0–0	0–2
Neman Grodno	2–1	2–1	2–0	3–1	1–1	2–0	0–2	1–0		0–1	2–0	1–1
Shakhtyor Soligorsk	0–0	3–0	5–0	1–1	2–0	0–1	4–1	2–0	2–0		2–1	2–1
Slavia Mozyr	0–1	0–1	1–1	3–2	0–0	1–2	2–3	1–1	1–0	0–2		0–3
Torpedo-BelAZ Zhodino	0–3	0–1	2–0	2–3	1–0	1–3	2–1	0–3	1–1	0–3	0–1	

Source: football.by
Legend: Blue = home team win; Yellow = draw; Red = away team win.

== Championship round ==
=== League table ===
Pos	Team	Pld	W	D	L	GF	GA	GD	Pts	Qualification
1	BATE Borisov (C)	32	21	4	7	61	25	+36	67	Qualification for Champions League second qualifying round
2	Shakhtyor Soligorsk (Note: Winners of 2013–14 Belarusian Cup.)	32	17	7	8	44	26	+18	58	Qualification for Europa League second qualifying round
3	Dinamo Minsk	32	15	9	8	44	33	+11	54	Qualification for Europa League second qualifying round
4	Neman Grodno	32	13	8	11	34	30	+4	47	Qualification for Europa League second qualifying round
5	Torpedo-BelAZ Zhodino	32	12	6	14	33	38	−5	42	
6	Gomel	32	11	7	14	34	40	−6	40	

Source: football.by
Rules for classification: 1st points; 2nd matches won; 3rd head-to-head (points, matches won, goal difference, goals scored); 4th goal difference; 5th goals scored
(C) Champions

=== Results ===
The best six teams of the first phase will play twice against every other team for a total of 10 matches.

Home \ Away	BAT	DMI	GOM	NEM	SHA	TZH
BATE Borisov		2–1	2–0	1–0	2–2	0–1
Dinamo Minsk	2–1		3–1	1–2	1–0	0–0
Gomel	0–1	1–4		0–1	1–3	1–2
Neman Grodno	1–0	0–1	1–2		2–1	3–0
Shakhtyor Soligorsk	0–3	0–0	1–2	1–1		1–0
Torpedo-BelAZ Zhodino	1–3	0–1	2–1	0–0	1–0	

Source: football.by
Legend: Blue = home team win; Yellow = draw; Red = away team win.

== Relegation group ==
=== League table ===
Pos	Team	Pld	W	D	L	GF	GA	GD	Pts	Qualification or relegation
7	Belshina Bobruisk	32	15	8	9	42	38	+4	53	
8	Dinamo Brest	32	11	7	14	32	41	−9	40	
9	Minsk	32	10	8	14	36	40	−4	38	
10	Naftan Novopolotsk	32	9	10	13	29	41	−12	37	
11	Dnepr Mogilev (O)	32	9	6	17	28	42	−14	33	Qualification to relegation play-offs
12	Slavia Mozyr (R)	32	5	8	19	24	47	−23	23	Relegation to Belarusian First League

Source: football.by
Rules for classification: 1st points; 2nd matches won; 3rd head-to-head (points, matches won, goal difference, goals scored); 4th goal difference; 5th goals scored
Winners of 2013–14 Belarusian Cup will qualify for the second qualifying round of UEFA Europa League
(O) Play-off winners; (R) Relegated

=== Results ===
The last six teams of the first phase will play twice against every other team for a total of 10 matches.

Home \ Away	BSH	DBR	DNE	MIN	NAF	SLA
Belshina Bobruisk		0–4	1–1	3–1	1–0	2–1
Dinamo Brest	0–1		0–1	1–0	1–1	3–1
Dnepr Mogilev	1–5	3–0		1–0	0–2	0–1
Minsk	2–3	3–1	1–0		4–0	1–1
Naftan Novopolotsk	0–1	1–3	1–0	2–1		2–1
Slavia Mozyr	0–1	0–1	2–1	1–2	0–1	

Source: football.by
Legend: Blue = home team win; Yellow = draw; Red = away team win.

== Relegation playoffs ==
The 11th-place finisher of this competition will play a two-legged relegation play-off against the runners-up of the 2013 Belarusian First League for one spot in the 2014 Premier League.

4 December 2013
13:00 UTC+3

Dnepr Mogilev	3–1	Gorodeya
Kazlow 68'; Bychanok 76', 84'		Markhel 88'

Spartak Stadium, Mogilev

8 December 2013
TBA UTC+3

Gorodeya	0–0	Dnepr Mogilev

Gorodeya Stadium, Haradzeya

Dnepr Mogilev won 3–1 on aggregate and remain in this division for next season.

== Top goalscorers ==
Rank	Goalscorer	Team	Goals
1	(Belarus) Vitali Rodionov	BATE Borisov	14
2	(Belarus) Dzmitry Asipenka	Shakhtyor Soligorsk	11
3	(Uruguay) Hernán Figueredo	Dinamo Minsk	10
3	(Belarus) Anton Matsveenka	Gomel	10
5	(Belarus) Pavel Sitko	Shakhtyor Soligorsk	9
5	(Belarus) Raman Vasilyuk	Minsk	9
5	(Belarus) Alyaksandr Pawlaw	BATE Borisov	9
5	(Belarus) Nikolay Signevich	Dinamo Brest	9
10	(Belarus) Mikhail Gordeichuk	Belshina Bobruisk	8
10	(Belarus) Denis Laptev	Slavia Mozyr	8

Updated to games played on 10 November 2013
Source: football.by

== See also ==
- 2013 Belarusian First League
- 2012–13 Belarusian Cup
- 2013–14 Belarusian Cup
