= 2014 Belarusian First League =

Belarusian First League
- Season: 2014
- Champions: Granit Mikashevichi
- Promoted: Granit Mikashevichi; Slavia Mozyr; Vitebsk
- Relegated: Volna Pinsk
- Matches: 240
- Goals: 635 (2.65 per match)
- Top goalscorer: Denis Laptev (23)
- Biggest home win: Gorodeya 6–0 Volna
- Biggest away win: Minsk-2 1–5 Gorodeya; Volna 1–5 Lida
- Highest scoring: Minsk-2 3–5 Zvezda-BGU

The 2014 Belarusian First League is the 24th season of 2nd level football in Belarus. It started in April and finished in November 2014.

== Team changes from 2013 season ==
The winners of last season (Slutsk) were promoted to Belarusian Premier League. They were replaced by last-placed team of 2013 Belarusian Premier League table (Slavia Mozyr).

The runners-up of last season (Gorodeya) lost the promotion/relegation play-off to Dnepr Mogilev (11th-placed Premier League team) and both clubs stayed in their respective leagues.

Two teams that finished at the bottom of 2013 season table (SKVICH Minsk and Polotsk) relegated to the Second League. They were replaced by two best teams of 2013 Second League (Gomelzheldortrans and Neman Mosty).

Neman Mosty eventually refused promotion due to insufficient financing and returned to Second League. They were replaced by Zvezda-BGU Minsk, who finished 3rd in the Second League.

Vedrich-97 Rechitsa were renamed to Rechitsa-2014 before the start of the season.

== Teams summary ==
Location of teams in 2014 Belarusian First League

Team	Location	Position in 2013
Slavia	Mozyr	Premier League, 12
Gorodeya	Gorodeya	2
Vitebsk	Vitebsk	3
Lida	Lida	4
Bereza-2010	Bereza	5
Smorgon	Smorgon	6
Granit	Mikashevichi	7
Smolevichi-STI	Smolevichi	8
Isloch	Minsk Raion	9
Khimik	Svetlogorsk	10
Volna	Pinsk	11
Rechitsa-2014	Rechitsa	12
Slonim	Slonim	13
Minsk-2	Minsk	14
Gomelzheldortrans	Gomel	Second League, 1
Zvezda-BGU	Minsk	Second League, 3

== League table ==
Pos	Team	Pld	W	D	L	GF	GA	GD	Pts	Promotion or relegation
1	Granit Mikashevichi (P)	30	19	7	4	46	16	+30	64	Promotion to Belarusian Premier League
2	Slavia Mozyr (P)	30	18	6	6	55	38	+17	60	Promotion to Belarusian Premier League
3	Vitebsk (P)	30	15	5	10	44	30	+14	50	Qualification for promotion play-off
4	Smorgon	30	13	7	10	42	32	+10	46 (Note: Smorgon placed above Rechitsa-2014 by better overall goal difference, with tied head-to-head record (1–2, 1–0) and equal number of wins.)	
5	Rechitsa-2014	30	13	7	10	41	36	+5	46	
6	Gorodeya	30	11	12	7	42	26	+16	45 (Note: Gorodeya placed above Isloch Minsk Raion by better overall goal difference, with tied head-to-head record (2–2, 1–1) and equal number of wins.)	
7	Isloch Minsk Raion	30	11	12	7	39	35	+4	45	
8	Khimik Svetlogorsk	30	12	7	11	34	36	−2	43	
9	Zvezda-BGU Minsk	30	12	4	14	50	48	+2	40 (Note: Zvezda-BGU Minsk placed above Smolevichi-STI by better head-to-head record (1–2, 2–0).)	
10	Smolevichi-STI	30	12	4	14	37	41	−4	40	
11	Gomelzheldortrans	30	9	9	12	33	38	−5	36	
12	Bereza-2010	30	8	9	13	37	48	−11	33 (Note: Bereza-2010 placed above Minsk-2 by better head-to-head record (2–2, 2–0).)	
13	Minsk-2 (R)	30	9	6	15	41	45	−4	33	Folded
14	Lida	30	10	1	19	46	64	−18	31	
15	Slonim	30	6	12	12	32	50	−18	30	
16	Volna Pinsk (R)	30	4	8	18	26	62	−36	20	Relegation to Belarusian Second League

Source: football.by
Rules for classification: 1st points; 2nd head-to-head (points, matches won, goal difference, goals scored); 3rd matches won; 4th goal difference; 5th goals scored
(P) Promoted; (R) Relegated

=== Promotion play-offs ===
The 12th placed team of 2014 Premier League (Dnepr Mogilev) will play a two-legged relegation play-off against the third placed team of 2014 Belarusian First League (Vitebsk) for one spot in the 2015 Premier League.

== Results ==
Home \ Away	BER	GZH	GRD	GRA	ISL	KHI	LID	MIN	RCH	SLA	SLO	SML	SMR	VIT	VOL	ZVE
Bereza-2010		2–1	0–1	0–2	1–2	1–3	2–4	2–2	3–2	1–2	2–2	0–3	0–0	0–2	0–0	3–1
Gomelzheldortrans	0–0		0–0	1–0	4–2	1–2	2–1	0–4	1–1	3–1	1–1	1–0	0–2	2–1	3–0	0–1
Gorodeya	1–2	0–0		0–2	2–2	3–1	1–1	1–0	1–1	0–1	1–1	3–2	1–0	1–0	6–0	2–0
Granit Mikashevichi	1–0	2–0	2–0		0–0	1–1	4–0	3–0	1–0	1–1	2–2	1–0	2–1	2–0	4–1	3–1
Isloch Minsk Raion	0–0	2–2	1–1	0–2		0–1	2–0	1–0	1–2	0–1	2–1	0–0	3–1	2–0	1–0	0–0
Khimik Svetlogorsk	4–0	1–1	0–0	1–0	2–3		1–0	1–0	1–1	0–2	0–0	2–0	0–0	1–2	0–3	2–1
Lida	3–4	3–1	2–1	2–4	0–1	3–1		1–3	1–0	0–1	4–2	0–4	2–4	1–4	3–2	2–3
Minsk-2	0–2	2–1	1–5	0–0	2–2	1–0	0–1		1–1	5–1	2–0	1–2	1–3	0–2	0–1	3–5
Rechitsa-2014	3–3	1–0	2–2	0–1	1–1	3–0	2–0	1–0		0–1	4–2	0–1	0–1	2–1	1–2	2–0
Slavia Mozyr	2–2	2–2	2–2	3–1	0–0	2–3	3–1	3–2	3–1		4–1	2–0	1–0	0–0	2–0	4–3
Slonim	0–2	0–2	1–0	0–0	2–2	0–0	3–1	0–3	0–1	2–1		3–1	0–0	0–3	1–1	2–1
Smolevichi-STI	2–1	1–0	0–2	1–0	3–4	2–0	1–0	1–1	2–3	1–3	1–2		1–1	0–3	3–1	2–1
Smorgon	2–3	2–0	1–1	1–2	2–0	2–1	2–0	2–1	1–2	0–1	2–1	3–1		2–1	3–1	2–3
Vitebsk	2–1	2–0	0–0	0–0	2–1	2–0	3–1	1–3	0–1	0–3	2–2	0–1	1–0		2–1	3–1
Volna Pinsk	0–0	1–3	0–4	0–2	1–1	1–3	1–5	2–2	0–2	4–3	0–0	1–1	1–1	0–3		1–2
Zvezda-BGU Minsk	1–0	1–1	1–0	0–1	2–3	1–2	2–4	0–1	5–1	3–0	5–1	2–0	1–1	2–2	1–0	

Source: football.by
Legend: Blue = home team win; Yellow = draw; Red = away team win.

== Top goalscorers ==
Rank	Goalscorer	Team	Goals
1	(Belarus) Denis Laptev	Slavia Mozyr	23
2	(Belarus) Mikalay Ryndzyuk	Smorgon	18
3	(Belarus) Mikhail Kolyadko	Rechitsa-2014	14
3	(Belarus) Dmitry Ignatenko	Granit Mikashevichi	14
5	(Belarus) Aleksandr Tatarnikov	Lida	12
5	(Belarus) Andrey Lyasyuk	Volna Pinsk / Gorodeya	12
5	(Belarus) Anton Saroka	Gorodeya	12
5	(Belarus) Dzmitry Lebedzew	Gorodeya	12

Updated to games played on 22 November 2014
Source: football.by

== See also ==
- 2014 Belarusian Premier League
- 2013–14 Belarusian Cup
- 2014–15 Belarusian Cup
