= 2011 Commonwealth of Independent States Cup =

CIS Cup, Кубок Содружества 2011

Tournament details
- Host country: Russia
- Dates: 15–23 January 2011
- Teams: 16
- Venue: 2 (in 1 host city)

Final positions
- Champions: (Azerbaijan) Inter Baku (1st title)

Tournament statistics
- Matches played: 31
- Goals scored: 84 (2.71 per match)
- Attendance: 40,800 (1,316 per match)
- Top scorer(s): (Latvia) Ģirts Karlsons (6 goals)

The 19th Commonwealth of Independent States Cup was the nineteenth edition of the competition between the champions of former republics of Soviet Union. It took place in Saint Petersburg between 15 and 23 January 2011 and was won by Inter Baku.

This was the last edition of the Cup as a club tournament, before the format was changed to a youth national teams event in 2012.

== Participants ==
Team	Coach	Qualification	Participation
(Russia) Zenit Saint Petersburg	(Russia) Anatoli Davydov	2010 Russian Premier League champions ^{1}	2nd
(Ukraine) Dynamo Kyiv	(Ukraine) Andriy Husin	2009–10 Ukrainian Premier League runner-up ^{2}	12th
(Belarus) Shakhtyor Soligorsk	(Belarus) Uladzimir Zhuravel	2010 Belarusian Premier League runner-up ^{3}	2nd
(Lithuania) Ekranas Panevėžys	(Lithuania) Valdas Urbonas	2010 A Lyga champions	4th
(Latvia) Skonto Riga	(Latvia) Marians Pahars	2010 Latvian Higher League champions	14th
(Estonia) Flora Tallinn	(Estonia) Martin Reim	2010 Meistriliiga champions	6th
(Moldova) Iskra-Stal Rîbnița	(Ukraine) Valeriy Chaly	2009–10 Moldovan National Division runners-up ^{4}	1st
(Armenia) Mika Yerevan	(Armenia) Armen Shahgeldyan	2010 Armenian Premier League 4th team ^{5}	1st
(Azerbaijan) Inter Baku	(Georgia (country)) Kakhaber Tskhadadze	2009–10 Azerbaijan Premier League champions	2nd
(Kazakhstan) Tobol Kostanay	(Russia) Ravil Sabitov	2010 Kazakhstan Premier League champions	1st
(Uzbekistan) Bunyodkor Tashkent	(Uzbekistan) Mirjalol Qosimov	2010 Uzbek League champions	2nd
(Tajikistan) Istiklol Dushanbe	(Tajikistan) Alimzhon Rafikov	2010 Tajik League champions	1st
(Turkmenistan) Balkan Balkanabat	(Turkmenistan) Aleksandr Klimenko	2010 Ýokary Liga champions	2nd
(Kyrgyzstan) Neftchi Kochkor-Ata	(Russia) Aleksandr Krestinin	2010 Kyrgyzstan League champions	1st
(Finland) HJK Helsinki	(Finland) Jani Viander	2010 Veikkausliiga champions ^{6}	2nd
Russia U21	(Russia) Nikolai Pisarev	Unofficial entry, not eligible to advance past group stage	8th

- ^{1} Zenit Saint Petersburg were represented by its reserve (U21) squad.
- ^{2} Dynamo Kyiv were represented by their reserve team Dynamo-2 Kyiv. They replaced Shakhtar Donetsk (2009–10 Ukrainian champions), who refused to participate.
- ^{3} Shakhtyor Soligorsk replaced BATE Borisov (2010 Belarusian champions), who refused to participate.
- ^{4} Iskra-Stal Rîbnița replaced Sheriff Tiraspol (2009–10 Moldovan champions), who refused to participate.
- ^{5} Mika Yerevan replaced Pyunik Yerevan (2010 Armenian champions), who refused to participate.
- ^{6} HJK Helsinki invited by the organizing committee to replace (Georgia (country)) Olimpi Rustavi (2009–10 Georgian champions), who declined to participate along with other Georgian teams due to the Russo-Georgian War.

== Group stage ==
=== Group A ===
Team	Pld	W	D	L	GF	GA	GD	Pts
(Azerbaijan) Inter Baku	3	3	0	0	7	0	+7	9
(Tajikistan) Istiklol Dushanbe	3	1	1	1	6	4	+2	4
(Moldova) Iskra-Stal Rîbnița	3	1	1	1	2	2	0	4
(Kyrgyzstan) Neftchi Kochkor-Ata	3	0	0	3	0	9	−9	0

==== Results ====
15 January 2011
11:00

Inter Baku (Azerbaijan)	3 – 0	(Kyrgyzstan) Neftchi Kochkor-Ata
Karlsons 20'; Chertoganov 45'; Yegorov 78'

SKK Peterburgsky, Saint Petersburg
Attendance: 200
Referee: Vitali Meshkov (Russia)
15 January 2011
11:00

Iskra-Stal Rîbnița (Moldova)	1 – 1	(Tajikistan) Istiklol Dushanbe
Kilikevych 46'		Tokhirov 46'

Zenit Palace of Sports, Saint Petersburg
Attendance: 100
Referee: Vladimir Pettay (Russia)

16 January 2011
11:00

Istiklol Dushanbe (Tajikistan)	0 – 3	(Azerbaijan) Inter Baku
		Erghashev 44' (o.g.); Suvonkulov 64' (o.g.); Rahimov 79'

SKK Peterburgsky, Saint Petersburg
Attendance: 300
Referee: Sergey Lapochkin (Russia)
16 January 2011
11:00

Neftchi Kochkor-Ata (Kyrgyzstan)	0 – 1	(Moldova) Iskra-Stal Rîbnița
		Suchu 71'

Zenit Palace of Sports, Saint Petersburg
Attendance: 200
Referee: Evgeny Turbin (Russia)

18 January 2011
12:00

Inter Baku (Azerbaijan)	1 – 0	(Moldova) Iskra-Stal Rîbnița
Amiraslanov 80'

SKK Peterburgsky, Saint Petersburg
Attendance: 1,000
Referee: Timur Arslanbekov (Russia)
18 January 2011
12:00

Istiklol Dushanbe (Tajikistan)	5 – 0	(Kyrgyzstan) Neftchi Kochkor-Ata
Sodikov 52', 84'; Saidov 73'; Fatkhuloev 76'; Vasiev 90'

Zenit Palace of Sports, Saint Petersburg
Attendance: 300
Referee: Maksim Layushkin (Russia)

=== Group B ===
Team	Pld	W	D	L	GF	GA	GD	Pts
(Latvia) Skonto Riga	3	2	1	0	6	1	+5	7
(Armenia) Mika Yerevan	3	1	1	1	4	5	−1	4
(Kazakhstan) Tobol Kostanay	3	1	1	1	4	6	−2	4
(Uzbekistan) Bunyodkor Tashkent	3	0	1	2	3	5	−2	1

==== Results ====
15 January 2011
13:00

Tobol Kostanay (Kazakhstan)	2 – 1	(Uzbekistan) Bunyodkor Tashkent
Bogdanov 6'; Rašković 16'		Soliev 26'

SKK Peterburgsky, Saint Petersburg
Attendance: 200
Referee: Aleksandr Yegorov (Russia)
15 January 2011
21:00

Skonto Riga (Latvia)	2 – 0	(Armenia) Mika Yerevan
Fertovs 39'; Nathan Júnior 62' (pen.)

SKK Peterburgsky, Saint Petersburg
Attendance: 200
Referee: Aleksei Eskov (Russia)

16 January 2011
13:00

Mika Yerevan (Armenia)	2 – 2	(Kazakhstan) Tobol Kostanay
Beglaryan 24'; Demel 60'		Yurin 52'; Volkov 73'

SKK Peterburgsky, Saint Petersburg
Attendance: 300
Referee: Vyacheslav Kharlamov (Russia)
16 January 2011
13:00

Bunyodkor Tashkent (Uzbekistan)	1 – 1	(Latvia) Skonto Riga
Rajabov 35' (pen.)		Blanks 28'

Zenit Palace of Sports, Saint Petersburg
Attendance: 300
Referee: Maksim Layushkin (Russia)

18 January 2011
14:00

Tobol Kostanay (Kazakhstan)	0 – 3	(Latvia) Skonto Riga
		Fabinho 61'; Nathan Júnior 64'; Blanks 77'

SKK Peterburgsky, Saint Petersburg
Attendance: 500
Referee: Sergei Karasev (Russia)
18 January 2011
14:00

Mika Yerevan (Armenia)	2 – 1	(Uzbekistan) Bunyodkor Tashkent
Tadevosyan 25' (pen.); Mkoyan 65'		Soliev 49'

Zenit Palace of Sports, Saint Petersburg
Attendance: 500
Referee: Mikhail Vilkov (Russia)

=== Group C ===
Team	Pld	W	D	L	GF	GA	GD	Pts
(Belarus) Shakhtyor Soligorsk	3	2	1	0	9	2	+7	7
(Russia) Zenit Saint Petersburg	3	2	1	0	4	1	+3	7
(Estonia) Flora Tallinn	3	1	0	2	3	7	−4	3
(Turkmenistan) Balkan Balkanabat	3	0	0	3	1	7	−6	0

==== Results ====
15 January 2011
13:00

Balkan Balkanabat (Turkmenistan)	1 – 2	(Belarus) Shakhtyor Soligorsk
Meredow 90'		Alumona 17'; Pyatrow 71'

Zenit Palace of Sports, Saint Petersburg
Attendance: 200
Referee: Aleksei Nikolaev (Russia)
15 January 2011
19:00

Zenit Saint Petersburg (Russia)	1 – 0	(Estonia) Flora Tallinn
S.Petrov 25'

SKK Peterburgsky, Saint Petersburg
Attendance: 4,500
Referee: Vladimir Kazmenko (Russia)

16 January 2011
15:00

Flora Tallinn (Estonia)	3 – 0	(Turkmenistan) Balkan Balkanabat
Dupikov 23'; Post 68', 90'

Zenit Palace of Sports, Saint Petersburg
Attendance: 300
Referee: Vitali Meshkov (Russia)
16 January 2011
19:00

Shakhtyor Soligorsk (Belarus)	1 – 1	(Russia) Zenit Saint Petersburg
Alumona 78'		Tsyganov 83'

SKK Peterburgsky, Saint Petersburg
Attendance: 5,300
Referee: Sergei Karasev (Russia)

18 January 2011
16:00

Shakhtyor Soligorsk (Belarus)	6 – 0	(Estonia) Flora Tallinn
Alumona 27', 35'; Balanovich 30'; Razhkow 32'; Kirenkin 40'; Sokal 90'

Zenit Palace of Sports, Saint Petersburg
Attendance: 300
Referee: Vyacheslav Popov (Russia)
18 January 2011
20:00

Zenit Saint Petersburg (Russia)	2 – 0	(Turkmenistan) Balkan Balkanabat
Murikhin 33'; Tsyganov 80'

SKK Peterburgsky, Saint Petersburg
Attendance: 1,500
Referee: Aleksandr Yegorov (Russia)

=== Group D ===
Official table
Team	Pld	W	D	L	GF	GA	GD	Pts
(Finland) HJK Helsinki	2	2	0	0	5	1	+4	6
(Ukraine) Dynamo Kyiv	2	0	1	1	1	2	−1	1
(Lithuania) Ekranas Panevėžys	2	0	1	1	2	5	−3	1

Unofficial table
Team	Pld	W	D	L	GF	GA	GD	Pts
Russia U21	3	2	1	0	5	2	+3	7
(Finland) HJK Helsinki	3	2	0	1	5	2	+3	6
(Ukraine) Dynamo Kyiv	3	0	2	1	1	2	−1	2
(Lithuania) Ekranas Panevėžys	3	0	1	2	4	9	−5	1

==== Results ====
15 January 2011
15:00

Dynamo Kyiv (Ukraine)	0 – 1	(Finland) HJK Helsinki
		Rafinha 90' (pen.)

SKK Peterburgsky, Saint Petersburg
Attendance: 1,300
Referee: Timur Arslanbekov (Russia)
15 January 2011
17:00

Russia U21	4 – 2	(Lithuania) Ekranas Panevėžys
A.Zabolotny 35'; Goshokov 42'; Ryzhkov 62', 83'		Anđelković 28'; Panić 48'

SKK Peterburgsky, Saint Petersburg
Attendance: 3,300
Referee: Eduard Malyi (Russia)

16 January 2011
15:00

Ekranas Panevėžys (Lithuania)	1 – 1	(Ukraine) Dynamo Kyiv
Varnas 62'		Prokypchuk 56'

SKK Peterburgsky, Saint Petersburg
Attendance: 1,000
Referee: Mikhail Vilkov (Russia)
16 January 2011
17:00

HJK Helsinki (Finland)	0 – 1	Russia U21
		Shatov 49'

SKK Peterburgsky, Saint Petersburg
Attendance: 1,500
Referee: Vyacheslav Popov (Russia)

18 January 2011
16:00

HJK Helsinki (Finland)	4 – 1	(Lithuania) Ekranas Panevėžys
Bah 29'; Parikka 41'; Rafinha 56'; Yobe 90+1'		Anđelković 64'

SKK Peterburgsky, Saint Petersburg
Attendance: 1,000
Referee: Sergey Lapochkin (Russia)
18 January 2011
18:00

Russia U21	0 – 0	(Ukraine) Dynamo Kyiv

SKK Peterburgsky, Saint Petersburg
Attendance: 1,500
Referee: Vladislav Bezborodov (Russia)

== Final rounds ==
=== Bracket ===
Quarter-finals (19 Jan)
(Azerbaijan)	Inter Baku	4
(Armenia)	Mika Yerevan	0
(Finland)	HJK Helsinki	1
(Russia)	Zenit Saint Petersburg	2
(Latvia)	Skonto Riga	2
(Tajikistan)	Istiklol Dushanbe	0
(Belarus)	Shakhtyor Soligorsk	2
(Ukraine)	Dynamo Kyiv	1

Semi-finals (21 Jan)
(Azerbaijan)	Inter Baku	5
(Russia)	Zenit Saint Petersburg	0
(Latvia)	Skonto Riga	1
(Belarus)	Shakhtyor Soligorsk	2

Final (23 Jan)
(Azerbaijan)	Inter Baku (p)	0
(Belarus)	Shakhtyor Soligorsk	0

=== Quarterfinals ===
19 January 2011
14:00

Inter Baku (Azerbaijan)	4 – 0	(Armenia) Mika Yerevan
Levin 30'; Karlsons 36', 60'; Kruglov 52'

SKK Peterburgsky, Saint Petersburg
Attendance: 1,500
Referee: Aleksei Nikolaev (Russia)
19 January 2011
16:00

Shakhtyor Soligorsk (Belarus)	2 – 1	(Ukraine) Dynamo Kyiv
Alumona 23'; Yanushkevich 62'		Makarenko 56'

SKK Peterburgsky, Saint Petersburg
Attendance: 500
Referee: Aleksei Eskov (Russia)
19 January 2011
18:00

Skonto Riga (Latvia)	2 – 0	(Tajikistan) Istiklol Dushanbe
Smirnovs 19'; Nathan Júnior 89' (pen.)

SKK Peterburgsky, Saint Petersburg
Attendance: 1,000
Referee: Vladimir Pettay (Russia)
19 January 2011
20:00

HJK Helsinki (Finland)	1 – 2	(Russia) Zenit Saint Petersburg
Parikka 85'		Matyash 62', 66'

SKK Peterburgsky, Saint Petersburg
Attendance: 1,500
Referee: Vitali Meshkov (Russia)

=== Semifinals ===
21 January 2011
17:00

Inter Baku (Azerbaijan)	5 – 0	(Russia) Zenit Saint Petersburg
Karlsons 2', 15', 53'; Zlatinov 7'; Amiraslanov 68'

SKK Peterburgsky, Saint Petersburg
Attendance: 3,000
Referee: Sergei Karasev (Russia)
21 January 2011
20:00

Skonto Riga (Latvia)	1 – 2	(Belarus) Shakhtyor Soligorsk
Razulis 85'		Rios 37', 45'

SKK Peterburgsky, Saint Petersburg
Attendance: 500
Referee: Maksim Layushkin (Russia)

=== Final ===
23 January 2011
15:00

Inter Baku (Azerbaijan)	0 – 0 (a.e.t.)	(Belarus) Shakhtyor Soligorsk
Penalties
Karlsons (penalty scored); Accioly (penalty scored); Červenka (penalty scored); Kandelaki (penalty missed); Chertoganov (penalty scored); Levin (penalty scored); Mzhavanadze (penalty scored)	6 – 5	(penalty scored) Sitko; (penalty missed) Razhkow; (penalty scored) Kolomyts; (penalty scored) Pyatrow; (penalty scored) Kurskis; (penalty scored) Lyavonchyk; (penalty missed) Grenkow

SKK Peterburgsky, Saint Petersburg
Attendance: 6,000
Referee: Vladislav Bezborodov (Russia)

INTER:
GK	(Georgia (country)) Giorgi Lomaia
DF	(Estonia) Dmitri Kruglov		(substituted off) 46'
DF	(Georgia (country)) Ilia Kandelaki
DF	(Georgia (country)) Valeri Abramidze		(substituted off) 110'
DF	(Azerbaijan) Volodimir Levin (c)	(yellow card) 49'
MF	(Azerbaijan) Aleksandr Chertoganov	(yellow card) 88'
MF	(Czech Republic) Bronislav Červenka
MF	(Bulgaria) Petar Zlatinov
MF	(Georgia (country)) David Odikadze		(substituted off) 70'
MF	(Azerbaijan) Arif Dashdemirov		(substituted off) 83'
FW	(Latvia) Ģirts Karlsons
Substitutions:
MF	(Azerbaijan) Rovshan Amiraslanov	(yellow card) 71'	(substituted on) 46'
DF	(Brazil) Danildo Accioly		(substituted on) 110'
MF	(Russia) Sergei Yegorov		(substituted on) 70'
MF	(Georgia (country)) Kakhaber Mzhavanadze		(substituted on) 83'
Manager:
(Georgia (country)) Kakhaber Tskhadadze

SHAKHTYOR:
GK	(Lithuania) Eduardas Kurskis
DF	(Russia) Yuri Kolomyts
DF	(Belarus) Artsyom Chelyadzinski	(yellow card) 22'
DF	(Belarus) Dzyanis Palyakow
DF	(Belarus) Alyaksey Yanushkevich
MF	(Belarus) Alyaksandr Grenkow
MF	(Belarus) Andrey Lyavonchyk (c)
MF	(Belarus) Ihar Razhkow	(yellow card) 87'
MF	(Belarus) Pavel Sitko	(yellow card) 75'
MF	(Belarus) Alexei Rios		(substituted off) 76'
FW	(Russia) Aleksandr Alumona
Substitutes:
FW	(Belarus) Alyaksey Pyatrow		(substituted on) 76'
Manager:
(Belarus) Uladzimir Zhuravel

== Top scorers ==
Rank	Player	Team	Goals
1	(Latvia) Ģirts Karlsons	(Azerbaijan) Inter Baku	6
2	(Russia) Aleksandr Alumona	(Belarus) Shakhtyor Soligorsk	5
3	(Brazil) Nathan Júnior	(Latvia) Skonto Riga	3
