= 2014 Belarusian Premier League =

Belarusian Premier League
- Season: 2014
- Champions: BATE Borisov
- Relegated: Dnepr Mogilev
- Champions League: BATE Borisov
- Europa League: Dinamo Minsk; Shakhtyor Soligorsk
- Matches: 192
- Goals: 456 (2.38 per match)
- Top goalscorer: Mikalay Yanush (15)

The 2014 Belarusian Premier League was the 24th season of top-tier football in Belarus. It began in March 2014 and ended in November 2014. BATE Borisov are the defending champions, having won their 10th league title last year.

== Format ==
The format of the competition stayed the same as the previous season. The league took place in two phases. The first phase consisted of regular double-round robin tournament between 12 teams. The best six teams qualified for the championship round, which will determine the champions and the participants for the 2014–15 European competitions. The remaining six teams play in the relegation group, where the top five teams will secure places in the 2015 competition, sixth team (12th overall) will play a two-legged relegation play-off against the third-placed team of the First League. All points collected during the first phase will count for the second phase as well. The league will be expanded to 14 teams for 2015 season and further expanded to 16 teams for 2016.

== Teams ==
Locations of teams in the 2014 Belarusian Premier League

Slavia Mozyr were relegated to the First League after finishing on the last (12th) position in 2013 season. Slutsk, the champions of 2013 First League, made their debut in the top flight.

Dnepr Mogilev, as the 11th-placed team in 2013 Premier League, had to compete in the relegation/promotion playoffs against First League runners-up Gorodeya. Dnepr won the playoff, 3–1 on aggregate, and both team retained positions in their respective leagues.

Team	Location	Venue	Capacity	Position in 2013
BATE	Borisov	Borisov Arena	13,084	1
Belshina	Bobruisk	Spartak Stadium (Bobruisk)	3,700	7
Dinamo Brest	Brest	OSK Brestskiy	10,162	8
Dinamo Minsk	Minsk	Traktor Stadium	17,600	3
Dnepr Mogilev	Mogilev	Spartak Stadium (Mogilev)	7,350	11
Gomel	Gomel	Central Stadium	14,307	6
Minsk	Minsk	Torpedo Stadium (Minsk)	1,600	9
Naftan	Novopolotsk	Atlant Stadium	4,500	10
Neman	Grodno	Neman Stadium	8,404	4
Shakhtyor	Soligorsk	Stroitel Stadium	4,200	2
Slutsk	Slutsk	City Stadium (Slutsk)	1,896	First League, 1
Torpedo-BelAZ	Zhodino	Torpedo Stadium (Zhodino)	6,524	5

1. Four games played at City Stadium in Borisov.
2. One game played at Yunost Stadium in Brest.
3. One game played at KFP Minsk.
4. Two games played at KFP Minsk.
5. Three games played at Vitebsky CSK in Vitebsk due to renovation works at Atlant Stadium.
6. Three games played at Shakhtyor Stadium and three games at Stroitel Stadium (both in Soligorsk) due to renovation works at City Stadium in Slutsk.

== First phase ==
=== League table ===
Pos	Team	Pld	W	D	L	GF	GA	GD	Pts	Qualification
1	BATE Borisov	22	15	6	1	46	12	+34	51	Qualification for championship round
2	Dinamo Minsk	22	15	4	3	33	8	+25	49	Qualification for championship round
3	Naftan Novopolotsk	22	10	7	5	30	20	+10	37	Qualification for championship round
4	Gomel	22	8	8	6	21	21	0	32 (Note: Gomel placed above Shakhtyor Soligorsk by better head-to-head record (1–0, 1–0).)	Qualification for championship round
5	Shakhtyor Soligorsk	22	9	5	8	20	20	0	32	Qualification for championship round
6	Torpedo-BelAZ Zhodino	22	8	7	7	21	20	+1	31	Qualification for championship round
7	Neman Grodno	22	7	6	9	25	24	+1	27	Qualification for relegation group
8	Minsk	22	8	2	12	23	26	−3	26	Qualification for relegation group
9	Slutsk	22	7	4	11	15	26	−11	25	Qualification for relegation group
10	Dinamo Brest	22	6	4	12	23	52	−29	22	Qualification for relegation group
11	Belshina Bobruisk	22	4	6	12	28	38	−10	18	Qualification for relegation group
12	Dnepr Mogilev	22	1	9	12	11	29	−18	12	Qualification for relegation group

Source: football.by
Rules for classification: 1st points; 2nd head-to-head (points, matches won, goal difference, goals scored); 3rd matches won; 4th goal difference; 5th goals scored

=== Results ===
Each team will play twice against every other team for a total of 22 matches.

Home \ Away	BAT	BSH	DBR	DMI	DNE	GOM	MIN	NAF	NEM	SHA	SLU	TZH
BATE Borisov		5–2	4–0	0–0	3–0	0–0	1–0	3–1	0–0	0–0	3–0	1–1
Belshina Bobruisk	1–2		7–0	0–1	0–0	1–2	0–3	1–1	3–4	2–1	1–2	0–1
Dinamo Brest	0–4	2–2		2–1	0–2	2–0	2–3	0–7	1–2	0–0	2–1	2–1
Dinamo Minsk	0–2	4–1	3–1		3–0	1–0	2–0	2–1	1–0	3–0	3–0	0–0
Dnepr Mogilev	0–1	0–0	0–1	0–1		1–1	1–1	0–2	2–3	0–1	0–2	2–2
Gomel	0–3	3–1	6–3	0–2	0–0		1–0	2–2	0–2	1–0	1–0	0–0
Minsk	1–4	0–1	2–0	0–2	1–0	1–2		0–1	1–1	3–0	1–0	0–2
Naftan Novopolotsk	1–1	3–1	1–1	0–2	0–0	1–0	0–4		2–0	1–1	1–0	2–0
Neman Grodno	1–2	1–1	1–1	0–2	4–1	1–1	0–1	0–2		3–0	0–1	0–0
Shakhtyor Soligorsk	2–0	1–2	2–3	0–0	0–0	0–1	3–1	2–0	1–0		2–0	2–0
Slutsk	1–3	1–0	1–0	0–0	1–1	0–0	2–0	0–0	0–2	0–1		2–1
Torpedo-BelAZ Zhodino	1–4	1–1	2–0	1–0	2–1	0–0	1–0	0–1	1–0	0–1	4–1	

Source: football.by
Legend: Blue = home team win; Yellow = draw; Red = away team win.

== Championship round ==
The best six teams of the first phase will play two times against every other team for a total of 10 matches.

=== League table ===
Pos	Team	Pld	W	D	L	GF	GA	GD	Pts	Qualification
1	BATE Borisov (C)	32	20	11	1	68	21	+47	71	Qualification for Champions League second qualifying round
2	Dinamo Minsk	32	18	7	7	44	21	+23	61	Qualification for Europa League second qualifying round
3	Shakhtyor Soligorsk	32	14	8	10	35	28	+7	50 (Note: Shakhtyor Soligorsk placed above Torpedo-BelAZ Zhodino by better head-to-head record (3 wins, 1 draw).)	Qualification for Europa League first qualifying round
4	Torpedo-BelAZ Zhodino	32	13	11	8	38	30	+8	50	Qualification for Europa League first qualifying round
5	Naftan Novopolotsk	32	11	10	11	40	43	−3	43	
6	Gomel	32	10	8	14	29	41	−12	38	

Source: football.by
Rules for classification: 1st points; 2nd head-to-head (points, matches won, goal difference, goals scored); 3rd matches won; 4th goal difference; 5th goals scored
(C) Champions

=== Results ===
The best six teams of the first phase will play twice against every other team for a total of 10 matches.

Home \ Away	BAT	DMI	GOM	NAF	SHA	TZH
BATE Borisov		0–0	4–0	4–0	1–1	1–1
Dinamo Minsk	1–2		0–2	2–0	1–4	1–1
Gomel	1–2	0–2		3–0	0–1	0–1
Naftan Novopolotsk	2–2	1–1	5–1		0–0	1–5
Shakhtyor Soligorsk	1–4	1–2	3–0	2–0		0–0
Torpedo-BelAZ Zhodino	2–2	2–1	2–1	3–1	0–2	

Source: football.by
Legend: Blue = home team win; Yellow = draw; Red = away team win.

== Relegation group ==
=== League table ===
Pos	Team	Pld	W	D	L	GF	GA	GD	Pts	Qualification
7	Minsk	32	16	4	12	45	36	+9	52	
8	Neman Grodno	32	11	9	12	41	36	+5	42	
9	Slutsk	32	11	7	14	26	34	−8	40	
10	Belshina Bobruisk	32	8	8	16	42	56	−14	32	
11	Dinamo Brest	32	7	5	20	29	68	−39	26	
12	Dnepr Mogilev (R)	32	2	14	16	19	42	−23	20	Qualification to relegation play-offs

Source: football.by
Rules for classification: 1st points; 2nd head-to-head (points, matches won, goal difference, goals scored); 3rd matches won; 4th goal difference; 5th goals scored
(R) Relegated

=== Results ===
The last six teams of the first phase will play twice against every other team for a total of 10 matches.

Home \ Away	BSH	DBR	DNE	MIN	NEM	SLU
Belshina Bobruisk		2–1	1–1	1–2	1–3	2–1
Dinamo Brest	0–1		1–1	1–2	0–1	0–2
Dnepr Mogilev	1–2	1–0		0–2	1–1	1–1
Minsk	1–1	5–2	2–1		2–1	0–0
Neman Grodno	5–2	0–1	1–1	2–4		2–0
Slutsk	3–1	1–0	2–0	1–2	0–0	

Source: football.by
Legend: Blue = home team win; Yellow = draw; Red = away team win.

== Relegation playoffs ==
The 12th-place finisher of this season (Dnepr Mogilev) played a two-legged relegation play-off against the third team of the 2014 Belarusian First League (Vitebsk) for one spot in the 2015 Premier League. Dnepr Mogilev were relegated to the Belarusian First League after losing the first leg 0–2, before drawing 1–1 in the second.

3 December 2014

Vitebsk	2–0	Dnepr Mogilev
Shakaw 75'; Baranok 88'	Report

Vitebsky Central Sport Complex, Vitebsk

6 December 2014

Dnepr Mogilev	1–1	Vitebsk
Sazankow 61'	Report	Baranok 88'

Spartak Stadium, Mogilev

Vitebsk won 3–1 on aggregate and gains promotion to the Belarusian Premier League.

== Top goalscorers ==
Rank	Goalscorer	Team	Goals
1	(Belarus) Mikalay Yanush	Shakhtyor Soligorsk	15
2	(Belarus) Alyaksandr Makas	Minsk	14
3	(Belarus) Mikhail Gordeichuk	BATE Borisov	12
3	(Belarus) Yahor Zubovich	Neman Grodno	12
5	(Belarus) Vitali Rodionov	BATE Borisov	11
5	(Belarus) Pavel Savitski	Neman Grodno	11
7	(Belarus) Sergey Krivets	BATE Borisov	10
7	(Belarus) Dmitri Khlebosolov	Belshina Bobruisk	10
8	(Belarus) Mikalay Signevich	BATE Borisov	9
8	(Belarus) Vadzim Dzemidovich	Naftan Novopolotsk	9

Updated to games played on 30 November 2014
Source: football.by

== See also ==
- 2014 Belarusian First League
- 2013–14 Belarusian Cup
- 2014–15 Belarusian Cup
