= Yegor Filipenko =

Belarusian footballer (born 1988)

Yegor Filipenko Ягор Філіпенка
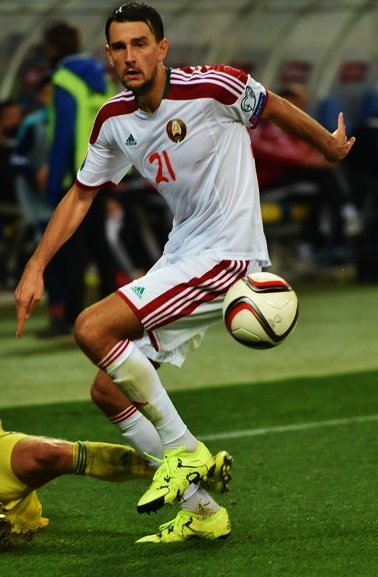
- Filipenko playing for Belarus in 2015

Personal information
- Full name: Yegor Vsevolodovich Filipenko
- Date of birth: 10 April 1988 (age 38)
- Place of birth: Minsk, Belarusian SSR
- Height: 1.90 m (6 ft 3 in)
- Position: Centre back

Youth career
- –2001: Smena Minsk
- 2001–2005: BATE Borisov

Senior career*
Years	Team	Apps	(Gls)
2006–2007	BATE Borisov	23	(2)
2008–2011	Spartak Moscow	16	(1)
2009	→ Tom Tomsk (loan)	2	(0)
2010	→ Sibir Novosibirsk (loan)	18	(0)
2011	→ BATE Borisov (loan)	20	(2)
2012–2014	BATE Borisov	64	(4)
2015–2016	Málaga	8	(0)
2016–2018	Maccabi Tel Aviv	18	(0)
2018	→ Ashdod (loan)	14	(0)
2018–2020	BATE Borisov	60	(2)
2021–2022	Shakhtyor Soligorsk	35	(3)
2022–2026	Ural Yekaterinburg	51	(1)

International career
2004–2005	Belarus U17	4	(0)
2006	Belarus U19	4	(0)
2009–2011	Belarus U21	21	(3)
2007–2017	Belarus	52	(1)
- * Club domestic league appearances and goals

Yegor Vsevolodovich Filipenko (Belarusian: Ягор Усеваладавіч Філіпенка; Russian: Егор Всеволодович Филипенко; born 10 April 1988) is a Belarusian former professional footballer.

He spent most of his career at BATE Borisov, winning seven Belarusian Premier League titles. He also spent time playing in Russia, Spain and Israel.

A full international for Belarus, Filipenko earned 52 caps in a decade-long international career starting in 2007. He scored the goal which qualified them to the 2012 Olympic tournament.

== Club career ==
=== Belarus and Russia ===
Filipenko was born in Minsk and was part of Smena Minsk's youth team. He then joined FC BATE Borisov's youth setup, and made his senior debuts for the latter in 2006.

In 2008 Filipenko moved to Spartak Moscow, but had difficulties retaining his place in the first team following the resignation of Stanislav Cherchesov and was sent out on a number of loans to other Eastern European teams. On 27 September 2009, Filipenko scored his first and only goal for the Moscow side in a 5–0 home win against one of his former clubs Tom Tomsk.

In February 2012 Filipenko returned to former club BATE Borisov, featuring regularly and scoring a career-best three goals in 2013. He was also crowned champions of the Belarusian Premier League four times in a row while playing for BATE.

=== Málaga ===
On 5 January 2015, Filipenko signed a two-and-a-half-year contract with La Liga side Málaga CF. Five days later he was featured in their matchday squad for the first time, remaining an unused substitute in a 1–1 draw with Villarreal CF at La Rosaleda. He made his debut on the 13th, replacing Marcos Alberto Angelleri for the last 25 minutes of a 2–3 away defeat to Levante UD in the last 16 of the Copa del Rey, Málaga nonetheless advanced on aggregate.

Filipenko made his Spanish top-flight debut on 6 December 2015, starting in a goalless draw at Athletic Bilbao and being replaced by Juanpi at half time.

=== Maccabi Tel Aviv ===
After only 11 matches in 18 months in Spain, Filipenko signed a two-year deal at Maccabi Tel Aviv F.C. on 14 June 2016. On 7 July, he made his debut in the 1–0 away victory against ND Gorica in 2016–17 UEFA Europa League qualification.

=== BATE Borisov (third spell) ===
Filipenko rejoined BATE Borisov for the third time in the summer of 2018, remaining with the Barysaw side until January 2021. In total, he has made 236 official appearances for the team, 21 as captain.

=== Ural Yekaterinburg ===
On 8 September 2022, Filipenko joined Ural Yekaterinburg in Russia.

== International career ==
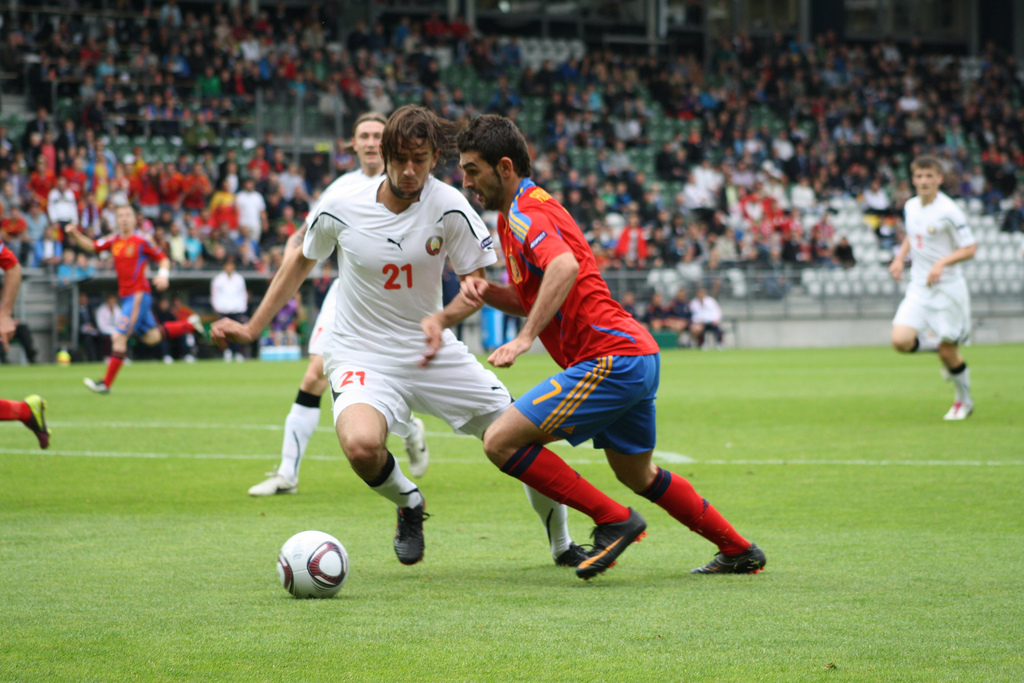
Filipenko challenging Spain's Adrián in 2011

Filipenko made his senior international debut on 12 September 2007, replacing Henadz Bliznyuk for the last 16 minutes of a 0–1 defeat to Slovenia at the Arena Petrol in Celje, for UEFA Euro 2008 qualification.

On 25 June 2011, at the finals in Denmark, Filipenko scored the only goal of the game in the Olympic Play-Off against the Czech Republic in the 88th minute. This took Belarus to the Olympic football championship for the first time in their history. However, he did not take part in the tournament, in which Belarus were eliminated in the group stage.

His first international goal came on 10 September 2013 in a World Cup qualifier against France at the Central Stadium in Gomel, opening the scoring with a 32nd-minute header, albeit in a 2–4 defeat. On 30 March 2015, Filipenko captained the Belarusians during the first half of the goalless draw with Gabon in a friendly match in Belek, Turkey.

== Career statistics ==
=== Club ===
As of match played 23 May 2026

Appearances and goals by club, season and competition
Club	Season	League			Cup		Continental		Other		Total	
Club	Season	Division	Apps	Goals	Apps	Goals	Apps	Goals	Apps	Goals	Apps	Goals
BATE Borisov	2006	Belarusian Premier League	3	0	1	0	0	0	—		4	0
BATE Borisov	2007	Belarusian Premier League	20	2	5	0	7 (Note: Six appearances in the UEFA Champions League, one appearance in the UEFA Cup)	0	—		32	2
BATE Borisov	Total		23	2	6	0	7	0	0	0	36	2
Spartak Moscow	2008	Russian Premier League	11	0	2	0	4 (Note: Two appearances in the UEFA Champions League, two appearances in the UEFA Cup)	0	—		17	0
Spartak Moscow	2009	Russian Premier League	5	1	—		—		—		5	1
Spartak Moscow	Total		16	1	2	0	4	0	0	0	22	1
Tom Tomsk (loan)	2009	Russian Premier League	2	0	1	0	—		—		3	0
Sibir Novosibirsk	2010	Russian Premier League	18	0	2	0	2 (Note: Appearances in the UEFA Europa League)	0	—		22	0
BATE Borisov	2011	Belarusian Premier League	20	2	0	0	10 (Note: Appearances in the UEFA Champions League)	0	1 (Note: Appearances in the Belarusian Super Cup)	0	31	2
BATE Borisov	2012	Belarusian Premier League	19	0	1	0	5	1	—		25	1
BATE Borisov	2013	Belarusian Premier League	22	3	0	0	2	0	—		24	3
BATE Borisov	2014	Belarusian Premier League	23	1	1	0	9	0	1	0	34	1
BATE Borisov	Total		84	6	2	0	26	1	2	0	114	7
Málaga	2014–15	La Liga	0	0	1	0	—		—		1	0
Málaga	2015–16	La Liga	8	0	2	0	—		—		10	0
Málaga	Total		8	0	3	0	0	0	0	0	11	0
Maccabi Tel Aviv	2016–17	Israeli Premier League	17	0	3	0	8	0	5 (Note: Appearances in the Toto Cup)	0	33	0
Maccabi Tel Aviv	2017–18	Israeli Premier League	1	0	1	0	3	0	4	0	9	0
Maccabi Tel Aviv	Total		18	0	4	0	11	0	9	0	42	0
Ashdod	2017–18	Israeli Premier League	14	0	2	0	—		—		16	0
BATE Borisov	2018	Belarusian Premier League	13	1	1	0	11 (Note: Six appearances in the UEFA Champions League, five appearances, one goal in the UEFA Europa League)	1	—		25	2
BATE Borisov	2019	Belarusian Premier League	23	0	2	0	3 (Note: One appearance in the UEFA Champions League, two appearances in the UEFA Europa League)	0	1	0	29	0
BATE Borisov	2020	Belarusian Premier League	24	1	5	1	1	0	—		30	2
BATE Borisov	Total		60	2	8	1	15	1	1	0	84	4
Shakhtyor Soligorsk	2021	Belarusian Premier League	25	2	4	0	4 (Note: Two appearances in the UEFA Champions League, two appearances in the UEFA Europa Conference League)	0	1	0	34	2
Shakhtyor Soligorsk	2022	Belarusian Premier League	10	1	0	0	2 (Note: Appearances in the UEFA Europa Conference League)	0	1	0	13	1
Shakhtyor Soligorsk	Total		35	3	4	0	6	0	2	0	47	3
Ural Yekaterinburg	2022–23	Russian Premier League	13	1	8	0	—		—		21	1
Ural Yekaterinburg	2023–24	Russian Premier League	16	0	2	0	—		1 (Note: Appearance in relegation play-offs)	0	19	0
Ural Yekaterinburg	2024–25	Russian First League	15	0	3	0	—		2 (Note: Appearances in promotion play-offs)	0	20	0
Ural Yekaterinburg	2025–26	Russian First League	7	0	1	0	—		1	0	9	0
Ural Yekaterinburg	Total		51	1	14	0	0	0	4	0	69	1
Career total			329	15	48	1	71	2	18	0	466	18

=== International ===
Appearances and goals by national team and year
National team	Year	Apps	Goals
Belarus	2007	5	0
Belarus	2008	10	0
Belarus	2011	2	0
Belarus	2012	5	0
Belarus	2013	8	1
Belarus	2014	5	0
Belarus	2015	6	0
Belarus	2016	6	0
Belarus	2017	5	0
Total		52	1

Scores and results list Belarus' goal tally first.

No.	Date	Venue	Opponent	Score	Result	Competition
1.	10 September 2013	Central Stadium, Gomel, Belarus	France	1–0	2–4	2014 FIFA World Cup qualification

== Honours ==
BATE Borisov

- Belarusian Premier League: 2006, 2007, 2011, 2012, 2013, 2014, 2018
- Belarusian Cup: 2019–20
- Belarusian Super Cup: 2011, 2014

Maccabi Tel Aviv

- Toto Cup : 2017–18

Shakhtyor Soligorsk

- Belarusian Premier League: 2021
- Belarusian Super Cup: 2021

Belarus U21

- UEFA European Under-21 Championship bronze: 2011
