= 2013 Belarusian First League =

Belarusian First League
- Season: 2013
- Champions: Slutsk
- Promoted: Slutsk
- Relegated: SKVICH Minsk; Polotsk
- Matches: 238
- Goals: 644 (2.71 per match)
- Top goalscorer: Syarhey Krot (17)
- Biggest home win: Smolevichi-STI 9–0 Polotsk
- Biggest away win: Polotsk 0–8 Gorodeya
- Highest scoring: Smolevichi-STI 9–0 Polotsk

The 2013 Belarusian First League is the 23rd season of 2nd level football in Belarus. It started in April and finished in November 2013.

== Team changes from 2012 season ==
The winners of last season (Dnepr Mogilev) were promoted to Belarusian Premier League. No teams relegated directly from the Premier League as it was expanded from 11 to 12 teams.

The runners-up of last season (Gorodeya) lost the promotion/relegation play-off to Torpedo-BelAZ Zhodino (11th-placed Premier League team) and both clubs stayed in their respective leagues.

One team that finished at the bottom of 2012 season table (Rudensk) relegated to the Second League. To compensate for Premier League and First League club withdrawals from last year, they were replaced by three best teams of 2012 Second League (Smolevichi-STI, Slonim and Isloch Minsk Raion) and the league was expanded from 15 to 16 clubs.

DSK Gomel withdrew from the league and disbanded due to lack of financing. They were replaced by Minsk-2, who finished 5th in last year's Second League. Gomelzheldortrans, Second League 4th team, declined invitation due to insufficient financing.

== Teams summary ==
Location of teams in 2013 Belarusian First League

Team	Location	Position in 2012
Gorodeya	Gorodeya	2
Vitebsk	Vitebsk	3
SKVICH	Minsk	4
Slutsk	Slutsk	5
Granit	Mikashevichi	6
Vedrich-97	Rechitsa	7
Volna	Pinsk	8
Bereza-2010	Bereza	9
Smorgon	Smorgon	10
Lida	Lida	11
Polotsk	Polotsk	12
Khimik	Svetlogorsk	13
Smolevichi-STI	Smolevichi	Second League, 1
Slonim	Slonim	Second League, 2
Isloch Minsk Raion	Minsk Raion	Second League, 3
Minsk-2	Minsk	Second League, 5

== League table ==
Pos	Team	Pld	W	D	L	GF	GA	GD	Pts	Promotion or relegation
1	Slutsk (P)	30	19	9	2	54	19	+35	66	Promotion to Belarusian Premier League
2	Gorodeya	30	18	6	6	68	32	+36	60	Qualification for promotion play-off
3	Vitebsk	30	16	7	7	40	29	+11	55	
4	Lida	30	15	7	8	53	38	+15	52	
5	Bereza-2010	30	14	8	8	44	30	+14	50	
6	Smorgon	30	13	7	10	45	35	+10	46	
7	Granit Mikashevichi	30	12	9	9	42	31	+11	45	
8	Smolevichi-STI	30	12	8	10	50	37	+13	44	
9	Isloch Minsk Raion	30	11	8	11	39	37	+2	41	
10	Khimik Svetlogorsk	30	11	8	11	37	36	+1	41	
11	Volna Pinsk	30	11	6	13	30	41	−11	39	
12	Vedrich-97 Rechitsa	30	9	12	9	47	36	+11	39	
13	Slonim	30	7	13	10	38	45	−7	34	
14	Minsk-2	30	7	5	18	32	49	−17	26	
15	SKVICH Minsk (R)	30	3	3	24	21	63	−42	12	Relegation to Belarusian Second League
16	Polotsk (R)	30	2	4	24	10	92	−82	10	Relegation to Belarusian Second League

Source: football.by
Rules for classification: 1st points; 2nd matches won; 3rd head-to-head (points, matches won, goal difference, goals scored); 4th goal difference; 5th goals scored
(P) Promoted; (R) Relegated

=== Promotion play-offs ===
The 11th placed team of 2013 Premier League Dnepr Mogilev played a two-legged relegation play-off against the runners-up of 2013 Belarusian First League Gorodeya for one spot in the 2014 Premier League and won the series 3–1 on aggregate.

== Results ==
Home \ Away	BER	GRD	GRA	ISL	KHI	LID	MIN	POL	SKV	SLO	SLU	SML	SMR	V97	VIT	VOL
Bereza-2010		0–2	4–1	2–1	0–1	0–2	3–0	7–0	1–0	1–0	1–1	2–1	1–1	5–3	0–0	0–0
Gorodeya	3–1		2–2	1–0	5–3	0–2	2–0	2–1	3–2	6–2	1–1	6–1	1–0	1–1	3–1	4–0
Granit Mikashevichi	5–1	1–1		3–1	2–0	2–0	0–0	0–1	1–0	1–1	1–2	0–1	3–2	3–0	0–1	2–1
Isloch Minsk Raion	1–2	1–0	2–2		0–1	2–1	2–1	6–0	2–1	1–0	0–2	1–1	0–0	2–3	2–1	2–2
Khimik Svetlogorsk	1–0	0–0	1–0	0–1		1–1	0–0	6–0	2–0	1–0	1–1	0–0	0–0	0–1	0–2	2–2
Lida	0–3	0–2	1–3	0–2	3–0		2–0	5–0	3–0	3–1	1–3	2–1	1–4	2–1	1–1	2–0
Minsk-2	1–1	1–2	1–0	1–1	2–3	0–1		1–0	4–1	1–2	1–2	2–1	1–0	2–1	0–1	0–2
Polotsk	0–2	0–8	0–4	1–2	0–1	1–1	0–4		1–5	0–0	2–1	0–1	1–2	1–5	0–4	0–3
SKVICH Minsk	0–2	0–5	0–0	0–2	0–1	1–2	4–3	0–0		0–2	1–2	0–3	0–3	0–4	1–2	3–0
Slonim	0–0	2–2	2–2	2–2	2–1	2–2	2–1	3–0 (Note: Awarded to Slonim as Polotsk did not show up for the game.)	2–1		0–0	0–1	1–1	3–3	1–4	1–2
Slutsk	2–0	1–0	2–1	3–0	1–0	3–3	3–1	3–0	5–1	1–1		0–0	1–0	0–0	1–0	0–1
Smolevichi-STI	1–2	4–0	1–2	0–0	1–6	0–3	3–3	9–0	2–0	5–1	1–1		3–1	3–0	0–1	1–1
Smorgon	0–1	2–1	3–0	4–2	4–2	0–3	2–1	3–0 (Note: Awarded to Smorgon as Polotsk did not show up for the game.)	0–0	3–2	0–4	0–1		0–0	4–0	1–0
Vedrich-97 Rechitsa	2–2	1–2	0–0	0–0	1–1	3–3	4–0	0–0	3–0	0–0	0–1	2–1	1–1		2–0	5–0
Vitebsk	1–0	1–0	0–0	2–1	5–2	0–0	1–0	2–1	2–0	0–0	1–4	1–1	3–2	2–1		0–1
Volna Pinsk	0–0	1–2	0–1	1–0	2–0	2–3	3–0	2–0	1–0	0–3	0–3	0–2	1–2	1–0	1–1	

Source: football.by
Legend: Blue = home team win; Yellow = draw; Red = away team win.

== Top goalscorers ==
Rank	Goalscorer	Team	Goals
1	(Belarus) Syarhey Krot	Smorgon	17
2	(Belarus) Dzmitry Kavalyonak	Granit Mikashevichi / Lida	15
3	(Belarus) Dzmitry Lebedzew	Gorodeya	12
4	(Belarus) Ilya Pukhov	Gorodeya	11
4	(Belarus) Denis Trapashko	Smolevichi-STI	11

Updated to games played on 23 November 2013
Source: football.by

== See also ==
- 2013 Belarusian Premier League
- 2012–13 Belarusian Cup
- 2013–14 Belarusian Cup
