= Pyatrow =

Pyatrow or Piatroŭ, feminine: Pyatrova, is a Belarusian spelling of the surname Petrov. Notable people with the surname include:

- Alyaksey Pyatrow (born 1991), Belarusian footballer
- Maksim Piatrou (born 1992), Belarusian canoeist
