= Stanislav Matyash =

Russian footballer

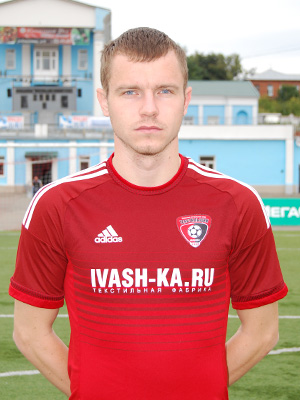

Personal information
- Full name: Stanislav Vladimirovich Matyash
- Date of birth: 23 April 1991 (age 35)
- Place of birth: Kremenchuk, USSR
- Height: 1.76 m (5 ft 9 in)
- Position: Forward

Youth career
- Smena

Senior career*
Years	Team	Apps	(Gls)
2007–2012	FC Zenit St. Petersburg	0	(0)
2011–2012	→ Volgar-Gazprom (loan)	21	(3)
2012–2013	FC Amkar Perm	3	(0)
2013–2015	FC Dynamo Saint Petersburg	60	(6)
2015–2016	FC Tekstilshchik Ivanovo	17	(3)
2016–2017	FC Neftekhimik Nizhnekamsk	15	(0)
2017–2019	FC Yenisey Krasnoyarsk	0	(0)
2018	→ FC Tyumen (loan)	0	(0)
2019–2022	FC Yadro Saint Petersburg (amateur)		
2022–2023	FC Yadro Saint Petersburg	23	(1)

International career
2009	Russia U-19	3	(1)
- * Club domestic league appearances and goals

Stanislav Vladimirovich Matyash (Russian: Станислав Владимирович Матяш; born 23 April 1991) is a Russian former football striker.

== Playing career ==
Matyash joined Zenit's "Smena" academy and made his first youth team appearance in October 2007 against Lokomotiv Moscow. He scored his first goal for Zenit on 31 October 2008 against Khimki. During the 2010 youth season, Matyash was the second highest top-scorer with 13 goals behind Mantas Savėnas of Sibir Novosibirsk.

While representing Zenit at the 2011 Commonwealth of Independent States Cup, he scored a double against HJK Helsinki in the quarterfinal round.

== International career ==
Matyash made his debut for the Russian U-19 team during the 2010 UEFA Euro U-19 qualification against Latvia. He scored his first goal for Russia in a 6-0 victory over Liechtenstein on 25 October 2009.
