= Filip Ivanow =

Belarusian footballer

Personal information
- Date of birth: 21 July 1990 (age 36)
- Place of birth: Minsk, Belarusian SSR
- Height: 1.95 m (6 ft 5 in)
- Position: Midfielder

Youth career
- 2007–2009: Dinamo Minsk

Senior career*
Years	Team	Apps	(Gls)
2009–2011	Dinamo Minsk	5	(0)
2012	Gomel	0	(0)
2012	SKVICH Minsk	12	(5)
2013	Vitebsk	13	(7)
2013	Dinamo Brest	5	(0)
2014	Shakhtyor Soligorsk	5	(0)
2014	Isloch Minsk Raion	5	(0)
2015–2017	Krumkachy Minsk	82	(22)
2018	Dinamo Minsk	25	(4)
2019	Minsk	6	(1)
2019	Dinamo Minsk	12	(2)
2020	Liepāja	8	(1)
2021	Krumkachy Minsk	30	(8)

International career
2009	Belarus U19	4	(0)
2010–2012	Belarus U21	17	(1)
- * Club domestic league appearances and goals as of 31 December 2021

Filip Ivanow (Belarusian: Філіп Иваноў; Russian: Филипп Иванов; born 21 July 1990) is a Belarusian former professional football player.

== Honours ==
Shakhtyor Soligorsk

- Belarusian Cup winner: 2013–14
