= Dzmitry Makar =

Belarusian footballer and coach

Personal information
- Date of birth: 1 October 1981 (age 45)
- Place of birth: Minsk, Belarusian SSR
- Height: 1.83 m (6 ft 0 in)
- Position: Midfielder

Team information
- Current team: Isloch Minsk Raion (coach)

Youth career
- 1998–1999: Smena Minsk

Senior career*
Years	Team	Apps	(Gls)
1999	Smena Minsk	5	(0)
2000	Darida Minsk Raion	9	(2)
2001–2002	Zvezda-BGU Minsk	30	(7)
2003–2004	Torpedo-SKA Minsk	53	(9)
2005	Shakhtyor Soligorsk	2	(0)
2006–2007	Neman Grodno	33	(8)
2007–2009	Minsk	41	(10)
2009–2012	Dinamo Brest	69	(8)
2012	Gorodeya	13	(3)
2013–2014	Rechitsa-2014	54	(12)
2015–2016	Isloch Minsk Raion	34	(4)

Managerial career
- 2016–2021: Isloch Minsk Raion (youth)
- 2021–: Isloch Minsk Raion (assistant)
- * Club domestic league appearances and goals

Dzmitry Makar (Belarusian: Дзмітры Макар; Russian: Дмитрий Макар; born 1 October 1981) is a Belarusian professional football coach and former player who workes as a coach at Isloch Minsk Raion.

== Career ==
Born in Minsk, Makar began playing football in FC Smena Minsk's youth system. He joined city rivals FC Zvezda-VA-BGU Minsk and made his Belarusian Premier League debut in 2002. Makar would join FC Shakhtyor Soligorsk where he was part of the squad that won the 2005 Premier League.

On 20 February 2018, the BFF banned him from football for 24 months for his involvement in the match-fixing.

== Honours ==
Shakhtyor Soligorsk

- Belarusian Premier League champion: 2005
