= José Luis Miñano =

Spanish footballer

Personal information
- Full name: José Luis Miñano García
- Date of birth: 22 May 1987 (age 39)
- Place of birth: Alicante, Spain
- Height: 1.74 m (5 ft 8 1/2 in)
- Position: Midfielder

Team information
- Current team: CF Benidorm
- Number: 10

Youth career
- Calpe
- Alicante
- San Blas

Senior career*
Years	Team	Apps	(Gls)
2006–2009	Alicante B		
2008–2009	Alicante	4	(0)
2009–2012	Valencia B	91	(5)
2012	Huracán	16	(1)
2013	Elche B	17	(2)
2013–2014	Torpedo-BelAZ	22	(1)
2014–2018	Hércules	135	(9)
2018–2019	Murcia	27	(1)
2019–2022	La Nucía	68	(0)
2022–2023	Gandía	24	(1)
2023–	CF Benidorm		
- * Club domestic league appearances and goals as of 31 May 2023

José Luis Miñano García (born 22 May 1987) is a Spanish footballer who plays for CF Benidorm as a midfielder.

== Career ==
Born in Alicante, Miñano began playing football in the youth system of Alicante CF. At age 21, he made his senior debut with the club and would make four Segunda División appearances before leaving for Hércules CF.

Miñano spent eight seasons in the Segunda División B with Hércules and Real Murcia.
