= Alyaksey Plyasunow =

Belarusian footballer

Personal information
- Date of birth: 3 January 1991 (age 35)
- Place of birth: Vitebsk, Byelorussian SSR, Soviet Union
- Height: 1.80 m (5 ft 11 in)
- Position: Midfielder

Team information
- Current team: Molodechno
- Number: 21

Youth career
- 2007–2010: Vitebsk

Senior career*
| Years | Team | Apps | (Gls) |
| 2010–2011 | Vitebsk | 2 | (0) |
| 2012–2013 | Polotsk | 41 | (3) |
| 2013–2014 | Vitebsk | 15 | (0) |
| 2014–2016 | Slonim | 51 | (2) |
| 2016 | Granit Mikashevichi | 15 | (0) |
| 2017 | Orsha | 14 | (0) |
| 2017 | Naftan Novopolotsk | 12 | (1) |
| 2018 | Granit Mikashevichi | 13 | (0) |
| 2018–2022 | Naftan Novopolotsk | 120 | (5) |
| 2023– | Molodechno | 14 | (2) |
- * Club domestic league appearances and goals as of 31 December 2023

Alyaksey Plyasunow (Belarusian: Аляксей Плясуноў; Russian: Алексей Плясунов; born 3 January 1991) is a Belarusian professional football player, who plays for Molodechno.
