= Dzmitry Asipenka =

Belarusian professional footballer

Personal information
- Date of birth: 12 December 1982 (age 43)
- Place of birth: Minsk, Belarusian SSR
- Height: 1.70 m (5 ft 7 in)
- Position: Forward

Senior career*
Years	Team	Apps	(Gls)
2000	Traktor Minsk	22	(9)
2001–2004	Lokomotiv Minsk	86	(32)
2005–2006	Smorgon	52	(31)
2007–2010	Minsk	109	(32)
2011	Vorskla Poltava	15	(2)
2012–2014	Shakhtyor Soligorsk	88	(30)
2015	Granit Mikashevichi	18	(4)
2016	Shakhtyor Soligorsk	21	(1)
2017–2018	Isloch Minsk Raion	25	(5)
2018	Luch Minsk	4	(1)
2019–2022	Arsenal Dzerzhinsk	127	(42)
2023	Kolos Chervyen	15	(2)
Total		582	(190)
- * Club domestic league appearances and goals as of 31 December 2023

Dzmitry Asipenka (Belarusian: Дзмітрый Асіпенка; Russian: Дмитрий Осипенко; born 12 December 1982) is a Belarusian professional footballer.

== Honours ==
Shakhtyor Soligorsk

- Belarusian Cup winner: 2013–14

Individual

- Belarusian Premier League top scorer: 2012
