= Yuri Kolomyts =

Russian footballer

Personal information
- Full name: Yuri Sergeyevich Kolomyts
- Date of birth: 30 April 1979 (age 47)
- Place of birth: Nizhny Tagil, Russian SFSR
- Height: 1.82 m (6 ft 0 in)
- Position: Defender

Team information
- Current team: Torpedo Zhodino (assistant coach)

Youth career
- 1996: Uralmash Yekaterinburg

Senior career*
Years	Team	Apps	(Gls)
1997–1998	Uralets Nizhny Tagil	42	(1)
1999–2002	Uralmash Yekaterinburg	77	(4)
2003	KAMAZ Naberezhnye Chelny	27	(0)
2004	Dynamo Barnaul	26	(0)
2005	Torpedo Zhodino	25	(2)
2006–2009	Irtysh Pavlodar	99	(1)
2010	Vitebsk	15	(0)
2011–2013	Shakhtyor Soligorsk	71	(7)
2014	Torpedo-BelAZ Zhodino	22	(1)
2015–2016	Sakhalin Yuzhno-Sakhalinsk	20	(2)
2016–2017	Luch-Energiya Vladivostok	35	(0)
2017–2021	Sakhalin Yuzhno-Sakhalinsk	93	(8)

Managerial career
- 2022–: Torpedo Zhodino (assistant)
- * Club domestic league appearances and goals

Yuri Sergeyevich Kolomyts (Russian: Юрий Серге́евич Коломыц; born 30 April 1979) is a Russian professional football coach and a former player. He is an assistant coach for Torpedo Zhodino.
