= Alyaksey Yanushkevich =

Belarusian footballer

Personal information
- Date of birth: 15 January 1986 (age 40)
- Place of birth: Minsk, Belarusian SSR
- Height: 1.90 m (6 ft 3 in)
- Position: Defender

Youth career
- 2003–2006: Dinamo Minsk

Senior career*
Years	Team	Apps	(Gls)
2005–2007	Dinamo Minsk	15	(0)
2008	Torpedo Zhodino	26	(0)
2009–2018	Shakhtyor Soligorsk	215	(7)
2019–2020	Isloch Minsk Raion	43	(0)
2021	Vitebsk	12	(0)

International career^{‡}
2005–2009	Belarus U21	16	(1)
2014–2017	Belarus	4	(0)
- * Club domestic league appearances and goals as of 31 December 2021 ‡ National team caps and goals as of 11 October 2017

Alyaksey Yanushkevich (Belarusian: Аляксей Янушкевіч; Russian: Алексей Янушкевич; born 15 January 1986) is a Belarusian professional footballer.

== International career ==
Yanushkevich made his debut for the Belarus national football team on 15 November 2014, in a Euro 2016 qualifier against Spain, playing the full 90 minutes.

== Honours ==
Shakhtyor Soligorsk

- Belarusian Cup winner: 2013–14
