= Andrey Baranok =

Belarusian footballer

Personal information
- Date of birth: 20 July 1979 (age 47)
- Place of birth: Vitebsk, Byelorussian SSR, Soviet Union
- Height: 1.84 m (6 ft 1/2 in)
- Position: Midfielder

Senior career*
Years	Team	Apps	(Gls)
1997	Lokomotiv Vitebsk	3	(0)
1998	Dinamo-Energogaz Vitebsk	4	(0)
1999	Ozertsy Glubokoye	22	(4)
2000–2001	ZLiN Gomel	42	(4)
2002–2007	Vitebsk	123	(14)
2008–2009	Gomel	44	(3)
2010–2012	Vitebsk	88	(8)
2013	Naftan Novopolotsk	27	(0)
2014–2017	Vitebsk	71	(5)
2021	Gorodok Lions	7	(2)

Managerial career
- 2018–2020: Vitebsk (reserves)
- * Club domestic league appearances and goals as of 31 December 2021

Andrey Baranok (Belarusian: Андрэй Баранок; Russian: Андрей Геннадьевич Баранок; born 20 July 1979) is a Belarusian former professional footballer. He spent most of his career in FC Vitebsk.
