= Dzmitry Kavalyonak =

Belarusian footballer

Personal information
- Date of birth: 3 November 1977 (age 49)
- Place of birth: Minsk, Belarusian SSR
- Height: 1.80 m (5 ft 11 in)
- Position: Forward

Youth career
- 1994–1995: Smena Minsk
- 1996–1997: Servette

Senior career*
Years	Team	Apps	(Gls)
1994–1995	Smena Minsk	16	(2)
1998–1999	Dinamo-Juni Minsk	25	(18)
2000	Dinamo Minsk	8	(0)
2001–2004	Neman Grodno	104	(28)
2005	Naftan Novopolotsk	8	(0)
2005–2006	Darida Minsk Raion	34	(13)
2007–2012	Neman Grodno	132	(36)
2013	Granit Mikashevichi	13	(3)
2013	Lida	15	(12)
2014–2017	Neman Grodno	55	(4)
Total		410	(116)
- * Club domestic league appearances and goals as of 3 December 2017

Dzmitry Yuryevich Kavalyonak (Belarusian: Дзмітрый Юр'евiч Кавалёнак; Russian: Дмитрий Юрьевич Ковалёнок; born 3 November 1977) is a Belarusian former professional footballer.

== Career ==
Born in Minsk, Kavalyonak began playing football with FC Smena Minsk before joining the reserves of Swiss side FC Servette at age 18. He has spent most of his career in the Belarusian Premier League with FC Neman Grodno.
