= Pavel Grechishko =

Belarusian footballer

Personal information
- Date of birth: 23 March 1989 (age 37)
- Place of birth: Minsk, Belarusian SSR
- Height: 1.85 m (6 ft 1 in)
- Position: Centre back

Youth career
- 2005–2007: Zvezda-BGU Minsk

Senior career*
Years	Team	Apps	(Gls)
2008–2009	Zvezda-BGU Minsk	57	(1)
2009–2011	Baník Most	27	(0)
2011	Zvezda-BGU Minsk	11	(6)
2012–2013	Smolevichi-STI	48	(6)
2014–2015	Gomel	0	(0)
2014–2015	→ Slavia Mozyr (loan)	49	(2)
2016	Belshina Bobruisk	14	(0)
2017–2019	Energetik-BGU Minsk	54	(2)
2019–2021	Krumkachy Minsk	62	(8)
2022–2023	Slutsk	36	(2)
- * Club domestic league appearances and goals

Pavel Grechishko (Belarusian: Павел Грачышка; Russian: Павел Гречишко; born 23 March 1989) is a Belarusian former professional footballer. He has played under coach Yuri Puntus in several teams.
