= Sergey Bondarenko (footballer, born 1994) =

Belarusian footballer

Personal information
- Date of birth: 19 May 1994 (age 32)
- Place of birth: Smorgon, Grodno Oblast, Belarus
- Position: Midfielder

Youth career
- 2009–2010: Smorgon
- 2010–2011: Dinamo Minsk

Senior career*
Years	Team	Apps	(Gls)
2011–2014	Dinamo Minsk	0	(0)
2011–2012	→ Dinamo-2 Minsk	51	(10)
2013	→ Smorgon (loan)	14	(1)
2014	→ Bereza-2010 (loan)	24	(1)
2015–2018	Smorgon	91	(4)
2018–2020	Lokomotiv Gomel	65	(6)
2021	Smorgon	24	(1)
2022	Kaisar	23	(0)
- * Club domestic league appearances and goals as of 31 December 2022

Sergey Bondarenko (Belarusian: Сяргей Бандарэнка; Russian: Сергей Бондаренко; born 19 May 1994) is a Belarusian professional footballer.
