= Alyaksey Pyatrow =

Belarusian footballer

Personal information
- Date of birth: 30 April 1991 (age 35)
- Place of birth: Gorodeya, Minsk Oblast, Belarusian SSR
- Height: 1.77 m (5 ft 9 1/2 in)
- Position: Forward

Youth career
- 2007–2009: Shakhtyor Soligorsk

Senior career*
Years	Team	Apps	(Gls)
2009–2016	Shakhtyor Soligorsk	20	(2)
2012	→ Volna Pinsk (loan)	11	(3)
2013	→ Dinamo Brest (loan)	9	(1)
2013	→ Isloch Minsk Raion (loan)	7	(0)
2015–2016	→ Gorodeya (loan)	45	(12)
2017	Isloch Minsk Raion	5	(0)
2017	Lida	11	(1)

International career^{‡}
2010–2011	Belarus U21	3	(0)
- * Club domestic league appearances and goals as of 31 December 2017 ‡ National team caps and goals as of 29 September 2011

Alyaksey Pyatrow (Belarusian: Аляксей Пятроў; Russian: Алексей Петров; born 30 April 1991) is a Belarusian former professional footballer.

== Honours ==
Shakhtyor Soligorsk

- Belarusian Cup winner: 2013–14
