= Pavel Sitko =

Belarusian footballer

Personal information
- Full name: Pavel Valeryevich Sitko
- Date of birth: 17 December 1985 (age 40)
- Place of birth: Rechitsa, Belarusian SSR
- Height: 1.84 m (6 ft 0 in)
- Position: Midfielder

Youth career
- DYuSHh Rechitsa

Senior career*
Years	Team	Apps	(Gls)
2003–2006	Vedrich-97 Rechitsa	67	(5)
2006–2009	Vitebsk	65	(9)
2009–2013	Shakhtyor Soligorsk	126	(30)
2014–2015	Gomel	42	(8)
2015	Slavia Mozyr	9	(3)
2016–2017	Gomel	38	(8)
Total		347	(63)

International career^{‡}
2008–2013	Belarus	15	(2)
- * Club domestic league appearances and goals as of 1 December 2017 ‡ National team caps and goals as of 16 October 2013

Pavel Valeryevich Sitko (Belarusian: Павел Сітко; Russian: Павел Ситко; born 17 December 1985) is a Belarusian former international football midfielder.

== Career ==
He has played for the Belarus national team from 2008 till 2013. Sitko scored his first goal for the national team against England in Minsk on 15 October 2008, in a World Cup qualifier.

== Honours ==
Shakhtyor Soligorsk

- Belarusian Cup winner: 2013–14

== International goals ==
Scores and results list Belarus' goal tally first.

#	Date	Venue	Opponent	Score	Result	Competition
1.	15 October 2008	Dinamo Stadium, Minsk, Belarus	England	1–1	1–3	2010 World Cup qualifier
2.	6 September 2013	Dinamo Stadium, Minsk, Belarus	Kyrgyzstan	3–1	3–1	Friendly
