= Syarhey Krot =

Belarusian footballer

Personal information
- Date of birth: 27 June 1980 (age 46)
- Place of birth: Osipovichi, Mogilev Oblast, Belarusian SSR
- Height: 1.90 m (6 ft 3 in)
- Position: Forward

Team information
- Current team: Minsk-2 (manager)

Youth career
- 1998–1999: Svisloch-Krovlya Osipovichi

Senior career*
Years	Team	Apps	(Gls)
1998–2001	Svisloch-Krovlya Osipovichi	69	(15)
2001	BATE Borisov	0	(0)
2002–2004	Darida Minsk Raion	37	(4)
2004	Smorgon	7	(1)
2005	Lokomotiv Minsk	18	(4)
2005	Shakhtyor Soligorsk	8	(1)
2006	Lokomotiv Minsk	30	(5)
2007–2008	Shakhtyor Soligorsk	19	(3)
2009	Smorgon	9	(1)
2009–2010	Nasaf Qarshi	33	(6)
2011	Al-Ahed	7	(2)
2011	SKVICH Minsk	5	(1)
2011–2012	Slutsk	37	(17)
2013	Smorgon	25	(17)
2014	Gorodeya	19	(3)
2015–2016	Smorgon	41	(22)
2016	BFC Daugavpils	13	(4)
2017	Baranovichi	23	(6)
2018–2019	Molodechno	47	(19)
2020–2022	Ostrovets	25	(15)

Managerial career
- 2020–2023: Ostrovets
- 2026–: Minsk-2
- * Club domestic league appearances and goals

Syarhey Krot (Belarusian: Сяргей Крот; Russian: Серге́й Крот; born 27 June 1980) is a Belarusian professional football coach and former player.

== Honours ==
Shakhtyor Soligorsk

- Belarusian Premier League champion: 2005

Al-Ahed

- Lebanese Premier League champion: 2010–11
