= FC Neman Mosty =

Neman Mosty
- Full name: Football Club Neman Mosty
- Founded: 1986
- Ground: Neman Stadium, Mosty
- Capacity: 2,500
- Head Coach: Yuri Chekan
- League: Belarusian Second League
- 2014: 10th

Neman Mosty is a Belarusian football club based in Mosty, Grodno Region.

== History ==
The team was founded in 1986. Until 1991 they played in Belarusian SSR league. In 1992, they joined newly created Belarusian Second League. From 1999 till 2003 they played in the First League, until the relegation. Since 2004, they are playing in the Second League again. In 2014, the team was eligible for promotion to the First League, but declined due to low financing. Since 2015 the club is playing in regional Grodno Oblast league.
