= Dmitry Ignatenko (footballer, born 1988) =

Belarusian footballer

Personal information
- Date of birth: 24 October 1988 (age 38)
- Place of birth: Mogilev, Belarusian SSR, Soviet Union
- Height: 1.85 m (6 ft 1 in)
- Position: Midfielder

Youth career
- 2004–2006: Dnepr Mogilev

Senior career*
Years	Team	Apps	(Gls)
2006–2010	Dnepr Mogilev	8	(0)
2006	→ Gorki (loan)	7	(1)
2008–2010	→ Spartak Shklov (loan)	29	(5)
2011	Smorgon	19	(1)
2012	Granit Mikashevichi	24	(8)
2013	Torpedo-BelAZ Zhodino	1	(0)
2013	→ Granit Mikashevichi (loan)	27	(6)
2014–2016	Granit Mikashevichi	66	(19)
2016–2018	Gorodeya	71	(8)
2019	Shakhtyor Soligorsk	0	(0)
2019	Dnyapro Mogilev	5	(1)
2020	Sputnik Rechitsa	11	(1)
2021	Smorgon	13	(0)
2022	Naftan Novopolotsk	21	(4)
2023	Servolyuks Mezhisetki	22	(21)
- * Club domestic league appearances and goals as of 31 December 2023

Dmitry Mikalaevich Ignatenko (Belarusian: Дзмітрый Мікалаевіч Ігнаценка; born 24 October 1988) is a Belarusian professional footballer.

== Honours ==
Shakhtyor Soligorsk

- Belarusian Cup winner: 2018–19
