= Shakhtyor Stadium (Soligorsk) =

Sports venue in Soligorsk, Belarus

- Location: Soligorsk, Belarus
- Coordinates: 52°47′36″N 27°32′59″E
- Capacity: 2,000
- Surface: Artificial grass

Tenants
- Shakhtyor Soligorsk (1992–1995); Shakhtyor Soligorsk (reserves) (2001–); Slutsk (2013–2014)

Shakhtyor Stadium is a multi-purpose stadium in Soligorsk, Belarus. It is currently used mostly for football matches and is the home ground of Shakhtyor Soligorsk reserve team. The stadium original capacity was 5,000, until the new seats were installed which reduced the capacity to the current 2,000 people.

Until 1995 the stadium was a home ground for the senior Shakhtyor Soligorsk team, before they relocated to the renovated Stroitel Stadium. From 2013 until 2014 the stadium was used as a temporary home for Slutsk, while their local stadium was closed for renovation.
