= Torpedo Stadium (Zhodino) =

Football stadium in Zhodino, Belarus

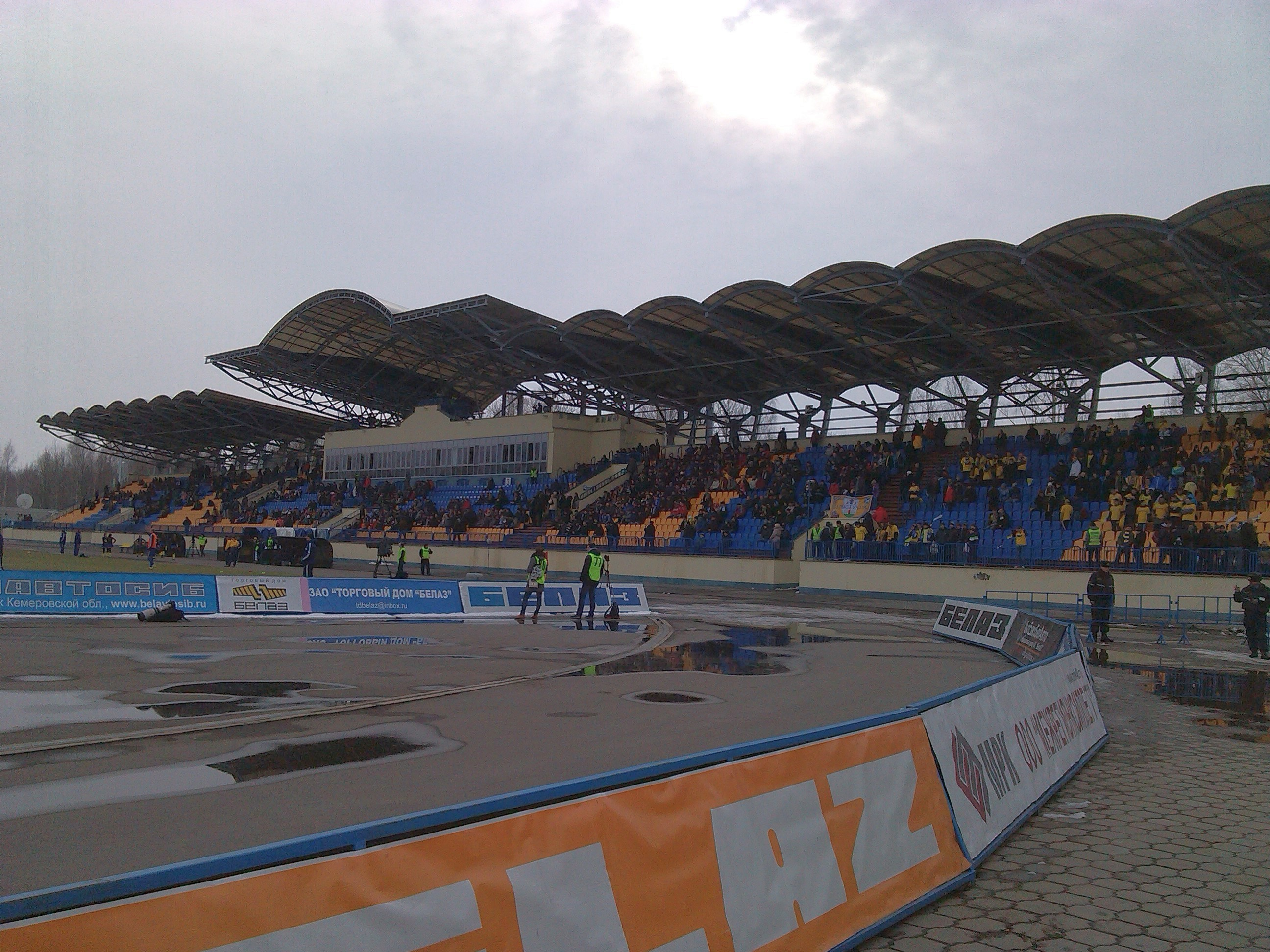
- Location: Zhodzina, Belarus
- Coordinates: 54°5′32″N 28°19′12″E
- Capacity: 6,524
- Field size: 105 m × 68 m (344 ft × 223 ft)
- Surface: Grass

Construction
- Opened: 1969
- Renovated: 2011

Tenants
- Torpedo-BelAZ Zhodino

Torpedo Stadium (Belarusian: Стадыён «Тарпеда», romanized: Stadyyon Tarpeda, Russian: Стадион «Торпедо», romanized: Stadion Torpedo, also Tarpieda) is a multi-purpose stadium in Zhodzina, Belarus. It is currently used mostly for football matches and is the home ground of Torpedo-BelAZ Zhodino. The stadium was opened in 1969, renovated in 2011, and currently holds 6,524 people.

The stadium hosted an international friendly between Belarus and Honduras on 24 March 2021. The match ended in a 1–1 draw.
