= Spartak Stadium (Mogilev) =

Football stadium in Mogilev, Belarus

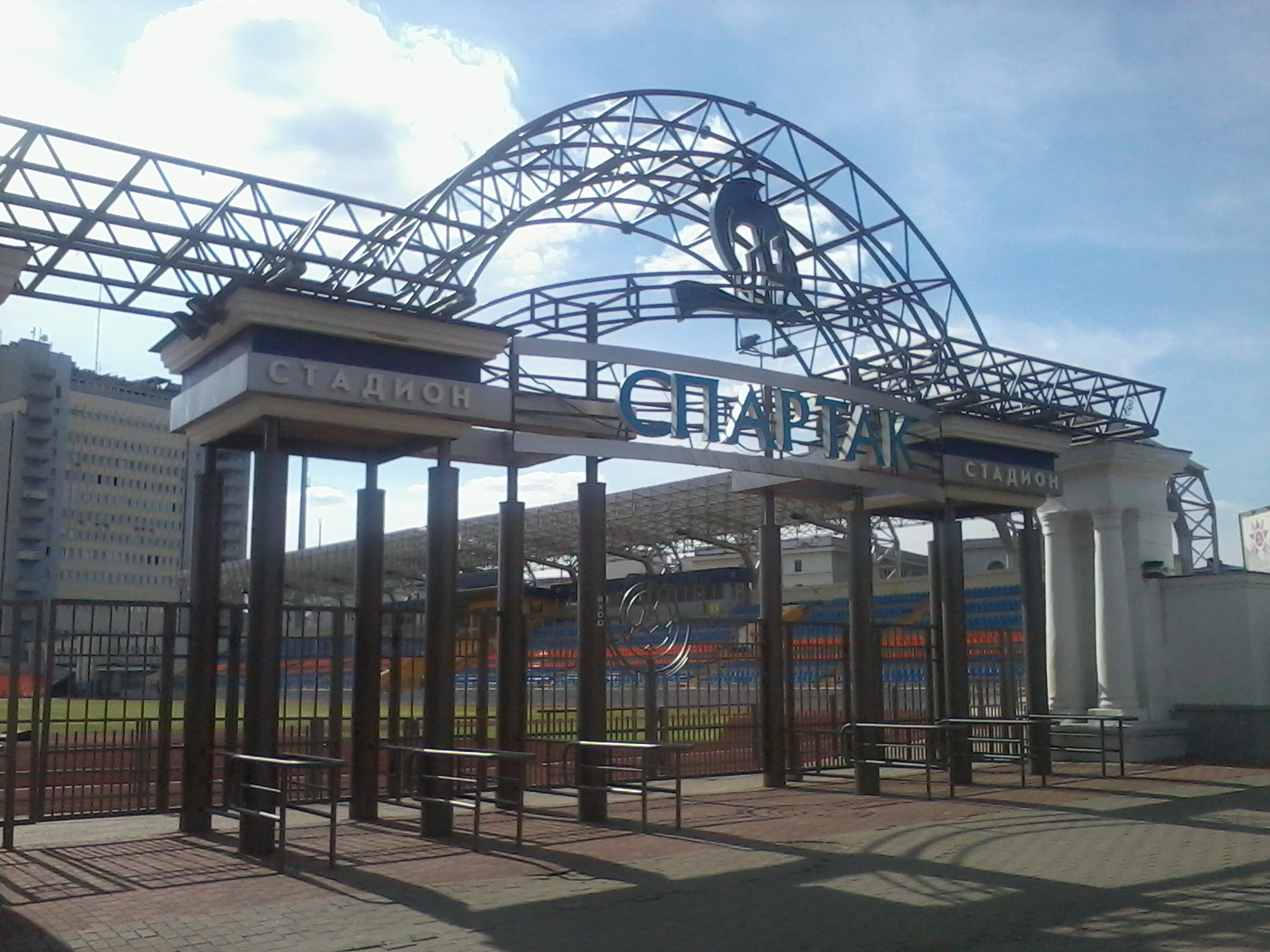
- Interactive map of Spartak Stadium
- Location: Mogilev, Belarus
- Coordinates: 53°54′19″N 30°20′26″E
- Capacity: 7,350
- Surface: Grass

Construction
- Opened: 1956
- Renovated: 1983, 1995–1997, 1999–2000, 2007–2008

Tenant
- Dnepr Mogilev

Spartak Stadion is a football stadium in Mogilev, Belarus. It is the home stadium of Dnepr Mogilev of the Belarusian Premier League. The stadium holds 7,350 spectators.

== History ==
The stadium was opened in 1956 and has been used by Dnepr Mogilev ever since.

== International use ==
The stadium was used Dnepr Mogilev in European Cups games. It also has been used as a home venue by Belarus women's national team.
