= Central Stadium (Gomel) =

Football stadium in Belarus

- Центральный стадион (Гомель)
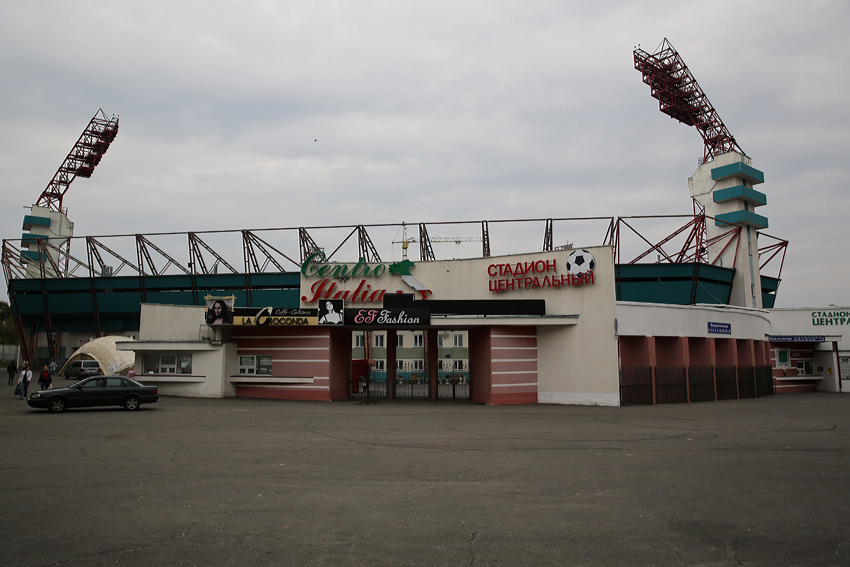
- Interactive map of Central Stadium
- Location: Gomel, Belarus
- Coordinates: 52°26′12″N 31°00′44″E
- Capacity: 14,307
- Surface: Grass
- Field size: 105 m × 68 m (344 ft × 223 ft)

Construction
- Built: 1930s
- Opened: 2004
- Renovated: 1999–2004

Tenant
- Gomel

Central Stadium (Belarusian: Цэнтральны стадыён; Russian: Центральный стадион) is a football-specific stadium in Gomel, Belarus. It is currently used as a home ground of Gomel. The stadium is all-seater and has a capacity of 14,307 people. The stadium was opened in 2004.

== History ==
The modern stadium was built at the site of an old multi-purpose stadium of the same name, which was built in the 1930s and used by Gomel until 1999. The stadium was then demolished and completely rebuilt during 1999–2004.

== International use ==
The stadium has been used by Gomel in international (mainly UEFA Europa League) matches. It was also used as a home ground for Belarus national football team on one occasion, which was a UEFA Euro 2008 qualifying match against Luxembourg in October 2007 that ended with 0–1 loss for the home team.
