= FC Minsk-2 =

Minsk-2
- Full name: Minsk-2
- Founded: 1954; 2024 (reformed)
- Dissolved: 2015
- Ground: KFP Minsk, Minsk
- Capacity: 1,500
- Head coach: Syarhey Krot
- League: Belarusian First League
- 2025: Belarusian First League, 10th of 18
Home colours	Away colours

Minsk-2 is a Belarusian football club based in Minsk and is a reserve team of FC Minsk.

== History ==
The team was formed in 1954 as FShM Minsk (Futbolnaya Shkhola Molodyozhi, or Football School of Youth) and was essentially a student team. During Soviet years, they spent the most of their seasons playing only in youth competitions, although they also spent several seasons in senior Belarusian SSR league. They adopted name Smena Minsk in 1989.

In 1992 Smena joined newly created Belarusian Second League. After several seasons spent in Second and First leagues as well as one season (1996) at youth level, the team partnered BATE Borisov and became their reserve/feeder team under the name Smena-BATE Minsk. The partnership ended in 2000 and the team reverted their name to Smena Minsk.

In 2005, while playing in the First League, they launched their own reserve team Smena-2 Minsk, who joined Second League.

In early 2006 a new senior professional team FC Minsk was founded on the basis of Smena. The new team took over Smena's First League license, the majority of the squad and facilities, and replaced Smena in the First League. A reserve team Smena-2 was renamed to Smena for the 2006 season and was folded by the end of the year, as Minsk got promoted to Belarusian Premier League and now had to sign a reserve squad for a separate Premier League Reserves competition.

A successor team Minsk-2 was created to participate in 2008 Second League season, after Minsk briefly relegated back to the First League. Minsk-2 was reformed again in 2012 as a ground for Minsk football academy graduates. After finishing the season at 5th place, Minsk-2 was invited to join First League as a replacement for disbanded DSK Gomel.

In early 2015, FC Minsk announced that their farm-club Minsk-2 was folded.

In 2024, after the abolishment of the Belarusian Premier League Reserves Championship, the club was restarted and accepted to Belarusian Second League. After winning the season, they got promoted to the First League for 2025.

== Current squad ==
As of 1 September 2026

Note: Flags indicate national team as defined under FIFA eligibility rules; some limited exceptions apply. Players may hold more than one non-FIFA nationality.

No.	Pos.	Nation	Player
1	GK	BLR	Matvey Sukharenko
2	MF	BLR	Valentin Dikhtiyevsky
3	MF	BLR	Aleksandr Khomenok
4	DF	BLR	Prokhor Sheremet
5	DF	BLR	Daniil Gorkovsky
6	FW	RUS	Vladislav Korotonozhkin
7	DF	BLR	Nikas Bulyga
8	MF	BLR	Stanislav Matusevich
9	FW	BLR	Ilya Bondarenko
10	MF	BLR	Ivan Volchok
11	MF	BLR	Renat Galiakhmetov
12	MF	RUS	Veniamin Kadochnikov
13	MF	BLR	Dmitry Denisenko
14	MF	BLR	Vladislav Ganchuk
15	DF	BLR	Artyom Sapego
16	GK	BLR	Maksim Geraschenko
17	MF	BLR	Yevgeny Kindruk
18	MF	BLR	Dzmitry Marozaw
19	FW	BLR	Vladislav Malyutin
20	MF	BLR	Artyom Gancharenko

No.	Pos.	Nation	Player
21	DF	BLR	Artyom Kazakov
22	FW	BLR	Ilya Porshnyov
78	MF	BLR	Timur Voytekhovich
80	MF	BLR	Ilya Ivanow
—	GK	BLR	Manolis Akritidis
—	FW	BLR	Grigoriy Bulatsky
—	FW	BLR	Ilya Dubinets
—	MF	BLR	Vladislav Khachaturyan
—	MF	BLR	Anton Lesik
—	MF	RUS	Konstantin Malitsky
—	FW	BLR	Arseny Migdalyonok
—	MF	BLR	Rustam Safi
—	GK	BLR	Vladislav Shabunya
—	DF	BLR	Roman Sitkikov
—	DF	BLR	Ilya Sviridenko
—	MF	BLR	Roman Tovstik
—	DF	BLR	Nikita Vasilevsky
—	MF	BLR	Yakov Yatsyno
—	FW	BLR	Yegor Yegorov
—	MF	BLR	Vladimir Zholudov

== League and Cup history ==
Season	League	Pos.	Pl.	W	D	L	GS	GA	P	Cup	Notes	Manager
1992	3D	1	15	10	1	4	49	15	21	Last 32		
1992–93	2D	8	30	12	6	12	42	50	30	Last 64		
1993–94	2D	15	28	3	7	18	15	50	13	Last 32	Relegated	
1994–95	3D – B	7	22	8	3	11	23	35	19			
1995	3D – B	4	12	6	1	5	23	14	19			
?
1997	3D – A	6	26	12	2	12	52	46	38			
1998	3D – A	4	26	14	7	5	55	23	49			
1999	3D – A	2	24	16	3	5	54	22	51			
?
2001	3D	18	34	1	1	32	13	119	4			
2002 in lower league
2003	3D	5	22	12	4	6	50	26	40			
2004	3D	1	24	19	1	4	55	17	58			
2005	2D	5	30	14	8	8	31	23	50		^{1}	
2006	3D	13	32	6	9	17	36	68	27	Second round		
2007	3D											
2008	3D											

^{1}Zmena-2 Minsk in Third level, club license transferred to FC Minsk. Zmena-2 Minsk became first team in 2006.
