= 2016–17 Belarusian Cup =

Tournament details
- Country: Belarus
- Teams: 47

Final positions
- Champions: Dinamo Brest (2nd title)
- Runners-up: Shakhtyor Soligorsk

Tournament statistics
- Matches played: 52
- Goals scored: 163 (3.13 per match)
- Top goal scorer(s): Dzyanis Laptsew, Dmitry Fedortsov (5 goals)

2016–17 Belarusian Cup was the 26th season of the Belarusian annual cup competition. Contrary to the league season, it is conducted in a fall-spring rhythm. The competition started with the first matches being played on 11 June 2016 and concluded with the final match on 28 May 2017. Dinamo Brest won the Cup and qualified for the second qualifying round of the 2017–18 UEFA Europa League.

== Participating clubs ==
The following teams took part in the competition:

2016 Belarusian Premier League all 16 teams	2016 Belarusian First League all 14 teams	2016 Belarusian Second League all 13 teams	Winners of regional cups 4 teams
BATE Borisov; Dinamo Minsk; Shakhtyor Soligorsk; Torpedo-BelAZ Zhodino; Naftan Novopolotsk; Isloch Minsk Raion; Minsk; Neman Grodno; Slutsk; Belshina Bobruisk; Dinamo Brest; Granit Mikashevichi; Slavia Mozyr; Vitebsk; Krumkachy Minsk; Gorodeya	Dnepr Mogilev; Smorgon; Oshmyany; Khimik Svetlogorsk; Zvezda-BGU Minsk; Smolevichi-STI; Gomelzheldortrans; Torpedo Minsk; Lida; Slonim; Baranovichi; Orsha; Luch Minsk; Gomel	DYuSSh-DSK Gomel; Kletsk; Dnepr Rogachev; Molodechno-DYuSSh-4; Montazhnik Mozyr; Neman-Agro Stolbtsy; Osipovichi; Torpedo Mogilev; UAS-DYuSSh-Zhitkovichi; Vertikal Kalinkovichi; Viktoriya Maryina Gorka; Volna Pinsk; Zabudova Chist	Pripyat Olshany (Brest Oblast); SDYuShOR-MTZ-Syabar Minsk (Minsk); Gorki (Mogilev Oblast); Senno (Vitebsk Oblast)

1. Gomelzheldortrans changed their name to Lokomotiv Gomel during the winter break.

== First round ==
The first round was contested by 30 teams. Zvezda-BGU Minsk were given a bye to the second round by drawing of lots. The other 13 First League clubs, 13 Second League clubs and 4 amateur teams were drawn into 15 fixtures, with lower league club in each pair to play at home. The matches were played between 10 and 12 June 2016.

10 June 2016	SDYuShOR-MTZ-Syabar Minsk (A)	0–7	Slonim (II)	Minsk
16:00		Report	Krasiy 37'; Shcharbakow 45+1', 72'; Igrusha 51', 57'; Dzegtseraw 78'; Zhukov 90+1'	Stadium: SOK Olimpiysky; Attendance: 150; Referee: Valeriy Golomzik (Bobruisk)

11 June 2016	Montazhnik Mozyr (III)	2–3	Smolevichi-STI (II)	Kozenki
14:00	Kachenya 51'; Lavrenchuk 84'	Report	Baiduk 17'; Rusak 39'; Stepanov 72'	Stadium: Polesye Stadium; Attendance: 350; Referee: Artur Kunay (Brest)

11 June 2016	Gorki (A)	1–5	Volna Pinsk (III)	Gorki
16:00	Kurgan 66' (o.g.)	Report	Mrinsky 3'; Gradoboyev 18'; Khamitsevich 30'; Rushnitsky 44'; Volodko 90+2'	Stadium: City Stadium; Attendance: 500; Referee: Vadim Erokho (Vitebsk)

11 June 2016	Kletsk (III)	1–5	Khimik Svetlogorsk (II)	Kletsk
16:00	Mintyuk 26'	Report	Yuditskiy 33'; Fedyanin 40'; A. Dashuk 49', 85', 89'	Stadium: City Stadium; Attendance: 200; Referee: Sergey Krasnikov (Grodno)

11 June 2016	Neman-Agro Stolbtsy (III)	2–1	Oshmyany (II)	Stolbtsy
16:00	Tyunis 45+2'; Malinovsky 53'	Report	Ladutko 39'	Stadium: Yunost Stadium; Attendance: 170; Referee: Vitaly Krivchik (Minsk)

11 June 2016	Vertikal Kalinkovichi (III)	2–1	Dnepr Mogilev (II)	Kalinkovichi
16:00	Mitsura 51', 85'	Report	Bordukov 20'	Stadium: SDYuSShOR-2 Stadium; Attendance: 350; Referee: Anton Lashuk (Molodechno)

11 June 2016	UAS-DYuSSh-Zhitkovichi (III)	0–7	Orsha (II)	Zhitkovichi
16:00		Report	Usachev 28'; Grechikha 41'; Znak 56'; Khodnevich 75', 90'; Prokopchik 82'; Hihevich 86'	Stadium: City Stadium; Attendance: 100; Referee: Sergey Chistov (Minsk)

11 June 2016	Zabudova Chist (III)	0–1	Lida (II)	Chist
17:00		Report	Lukashin 25'	Stadium: School Stadium; Attendance: 100; Referee: Aleksey Romanov (Polotsk)

11 June 2016	Senno (A)	3–0	Luch Minsk (II)	Beshenkovichi
17:00	Kazlowski 46'; Gerasichkin 61'; Tolstashev 71'	Report		Stadium: City Stadium; Attendance: 150; Referee: Dmitriy Digilevich (Zhodino)

11 June 2016	Dnepr Rogachev (III)	2–7	Baranovichi (II)	Rogachev
17:00	Lagutin 45'; Serakov 83'	Report	Tseslyukevich 4', 30', 81'; Fedortsov 15'; Dubovik 24', 28'; Pitsyk 50'	Stadium: Tikhinichi Sportcomplex; Attendance: 100; Referee: Pavel Koronets (Zhodino)

11 June 2016	Osipovichi (III)	1–2 (a.e.t.)	Gomelzheldortrans (II)	Osipovichi
18:00	Kozlovskiy 90+1'	Report	Shreitor 3'; Zhostkin 120+1'	Stadium: Yunost Stadium; Attendance: 470; Referee: Valentin Bliznyuk (Minsk)

11 June 2016	Viktoriya Maryina Gorka (III)	0–5	Smorgon (II)	Maryina Gorka
18:00		Report	Kleschenok 16'; Dzemidovich 29'; Smunev 43'; Ryndzyuk 87', 90+1'	Stadium: City Stadium; Attendance: 150; Referee: Andrey Vasilevich (Mozyr)

11 June 2016	Molodechno-DYuSSh-4 (III)	0–2	Gomel (II)	Molodechno
18:00		Report	Troyakov 10', 33'	Stadium: City Stadium; Attendance: 400; Referee: Sergey Lobatsevich (Vitebsk)

11 June 2016	DYuSSh-DSK Gomel (III)	0–4	Torpedo Minsk (II)	Gomel
19:00		Report	Kupnevsky 19', 64'; Lynko 41'; Petrusevich 83'	Stadium: SDYuSShOR-8 Stadium; Attendance: 150; Referee: Kirill Pilipovets (Molodechno)

12 June 2016	Pripyat Olshany (A)	0–1	Torpedo Mogilev (III)	Olshany
14:00		Report	Antonenko 66'	Stadium: School Stadium; Attendance: 1,950; Referee: Vladislav Golodukhin (Brest)

== Round of 32 ==
In this round 15 winners of the first round and Zvezda-BGU Minsk were drawn against 16 Premier League clubs. The matches will be played between 6 July and 14 September 2016.

6 July 2016	Orsha (II)	0–4	Minsk	Orsha
18:30		Report	Yevdokimov 28'; Kovel 39'; Prokopchik 62' (o.g.); Vasilyew 79'	Stadium: City Stadium; Attendance: 1,300; Referee: Oleg Murashkevich (Novopolotsk)

6 July 2016	Slonim (II)	0–2	Dinamo Brest	Slonim
18:30		Report	German 1'; Chizh 44'	Stadium: Yunost Stadium; Attendance: 1,000; Referee: Mikhail Lavsky (Gomel)

7 July 2016	Neman-Agro Stolbtsy (III)	0–5	Neman Grodno	Stolbtsy
18:00		Report	Savitski 14', 75', 84'; Vyarheychyk 29'; Kavalyonak 79'	Stadium: Yunost Stadium; Attendance: 300; Referee: Nikita Pyreyev (Minsk)

8 July 2016	Zvezda-BGU Minsk (II)	0–0 (a.e.t.) (2–3 p)	Gorodeya	Minsk
17:00		Report		Stadium: RCOP-BGU Stadium; Attendance: 100; Referee: Vladimir Ischenko (Rechitsa)
	Penalties
	Tamelo (penalty missed); Zyl (penalty missed); Raschenya (penalty scored); Kazlow (penalty scored); Burets (penalty missed)		(penalty missed) Pavlyuchek; (penalty scored) Tupchiy; (penalty scored) Khaletski; (penalty missed) Yakubovich; (penalty scored) Yaraslawski

8 July 2016	Smolevichi-STI (II)	0–1	Vitebsk	Smolevichi
18:00		Report	Salavey 73'	Stadium: FOK Stadium; Attendance: 350; Referee: Aleksei Kulbakov (Gomel)

9 July 2016	Khimik Svetlogorsk (II)	0–4	Slutsk	Svetlogorsk
17:00		Report	Milko 13'; Aliseiko 20' (pen.), 57' (pen.); Shchagrykovich 43'	Stadium: Khimik Stadium; Attendance: 500; Referee: Andrey Divakov (Mogilev)

9 July 2016	Smorgon (II)	3–0	Granit Mikashevichi	Smorgon
17:00	Ganich 32'; Golyatkin 58' (o.g.); Krot 76'	Report		Stadium: Yunost Stadium; Attendance: 470; Referee: Igor Kruk (Molodechno)

9 July 2016	Senno (A)	0–1	Naftan Novopolotsk	Beshenkovichi
17:00		Report	Harbachow 53'	Stadium: City Stadium; Attendance: 600; Referee: Denis Scherbakov (Minsk)

9 July 2016	Baranovichi (II)	3–2 (a.e.t.)	Belshina Bobruisk	Baranovichi
18:00	Dubovik 87'; Fedortsov 94', 110'	Report	Yushin 19'; Shokurov 112'	Stadium: Lokomotiv Stadium; Attendance: 1,100; Referee: Vitaly Sevostyanik (Grodno)

9 July 2016	Volna Pinsk (III)	0–4	Torpedo-BelAZ Zhodino	Pinsk
19:00		Report	Dzemidovich 10', 59'; Shcherba 39'; Holenkov 83'	Stadium: Volna Stadium; Attendance: 1,020; Referee: Dmitry Dolya (Grodno)

9 July 2016	Gomelzheldortrans (II)	2–1	Krumkachy Minsk	Gomel
19:00	Shreitor 42'; Lavrenchuk 69'	Report	Shikavka 11'	Stadium: SDYuSShOR-8 Stadium; Attendance: 1,000; Referee: Viktor Shimusik (Osipovichi)

10 July 2016	Torpedo Minsk (II)	0–2	Slavia Mozyr	Minsk
18:00		Report	Maltsaw 72'; Zhuk 90+4'	Stadium: Torpedo Stadium; Attendance: 550; Referee: Sergey Tsinkevich (Osipovichi)

26 July 2016	Vertikal Kalinkovichi (III)	1–6	Isloch Minsk Raion	Kalinkovichi
18:00	Fedorenko 17'	Report	Kamarowski 9'; Dzenisevich 45+3'; Ryzhko 51'; Krotaw 79', 88'; Papush 90+3'	Stadium: SDYuShOR-2 Stadium; Attendance: 500; Referee: Nikita Pyreyev (Minsk)

1 September 2016	Gomel (II)	0–1	Dinamo Minsk	Gomel
18:30		Report	Khvashchynski 86'	Stadium: Central Stadium; Attendance: 3,200; Referee: Oleg Murashkevich (Novopolotsk)

6 September 2016	Lida (II)	0–2	Shakhtyor Soligorsk	Lida
17:30		Report	Laptsew 11', 24'	Stadium: Start Stadium; Attendance: 200; Referee: Vladimir Ischenko (Rechitsa)

14 September 2016	Torpedo Mogilev (III)	0–4	BATE Borisov	Mogilev
18:00		Report	Signevich 33', 82'; Ivanić 66'; Hayduchyk 86'	Stadium: Spartak Stadium; Attendance: 1,500; Referee: Nikita Pyreyev (Minsk)

== Round of 16 ==
In this round the 16 winners of the previous round were paired by an open draw. The draw was conducted on 27 July 2016. The matches will be played on 21 September 2016.

21 September 2016	Baranovichi (II)	2–3 (a.e.t.)	Minsk	Baranovichi
16:00	Fedortsov 74', 117' (pen.)	Report	Yevdokimov 47'; Čović 95' (pen.); Vasilyew 96'	Stadium: Lokomotiv Stadium; Attendance: 600; Referee: Vitaly Sevostyanik (Grodno)

21 September 2016	Slutsk	3–0	Smorgon (II)	Slutsk
16:30	Bobko 15', 21'; Rushnitsky 86'	Report		Stadium: City Stadium; Attendance: 650; Referee: Oleg Murashkevich (Novopolotsk)

21 September 2016	Gomelzheldortrans (II)	0–0 (a.e.t.) (3–0 p)	Slavia Mozyr	Gomel
17:30		Report		Stadium: SDYuShOR-8 Stadium; Attendance: 500; Referee: Dmitry Dolya (Grodno)
	Penalties
	Khizhnyak (penalty scored); Arhiptsaw (penalty scored); Lavrenchuk (penalty scored)		(penalty missed) Varankow; (penalty missed) Kavalewski; (penalty missed) Raewski

21 September 2016	Gorodeya	0–0 (a.e.t.) (1–4 p)	Dinamo Minsk	Gorodeya
18:00		Report		Stadium: Gorodeya Stadium; Attendance: 850; Referee: Sergey Tsinkevich (Osipovichi)
	Penalties
	Lebedzew (penalty missed); Kalpachuk (penalty scored); Milovanović (penalty missed)		(penalty scored) Bykov; (penalty scored) Noyok; (penalty scored) Karytska; (penalty scored) Zhukowski

21 September 2016	Dinamo Brest	2–1	Naftan Novopolotsk	Brest
18:30	Amadu 3'; Afoakwa 90+2'	Report	Teplov 18'	Stadium: OSK Brestsky; Attendance: 2,600; Referee: Igor Kruk (Molodechno)

21 September 2016	Torpedo-BelAZ Zhodino	2–1	Vitebsk	Zhodino
19:00	Klopotskiy 20'; Dzemidovich 61'	Report	Vyarheychyk 78'	Stadium: Torpedo Stadium; Attendance: 480; Referee: Viktor Shimusik (Osipovichi)

21 September 2016	BATE Borisov	4–2	Isloch Minsk Raion	Borisov
19:00	Dzhigero 11', 50'; Gvilia 24'; Rodionov 82'	Report	Yasyukevich 25'; Bliznyuk 20'	Stadium: Borisov Arena; Attendance: 2,097; Referee: Vadim Panchenko (Mogilev)

21 September 2016	Neman Grodno	1–2 (a.e.t.)	Shakhtyor Soligorsk	Grodno
19:30	Savitski 68' (pen.)	Report	Laptsew 32'; Pawlaw 96'	Stadium: Neman Stadium; Attendance: 800; Referee: Aleksei Kulbakov (Gomel)

1. Match moved to BATE ground after original draw per mutual agreement.

== Quarter-finals ==
The draw was made on 22 September 2016. The matches were played in March 2017.

Team 1	Agg.	Team 2	1st leg	2nd leg
Lokomotiv Gomel (II)	1–5	Shakhtyor Soligorsk	0–3	1–2
Dinamo Minsk	2–2 (a)	Dinamo Brest	2–2	0–0
Torpedo-BelAZ Zhodino	1–2	Slutsk	1–0	0–2
Minsk	1–3	BATE Borisov	0–1	1–2

=== First leg ===
12 March 2017	Lokomotiv Gomel (II)	0–3	Shakhtyor Soligorsk	Gomel
14:00		Report	Laptsew 63', 86'; Aleksiyevich 82'	Stadium: SDYuShOR-8 Stadium; Attendance: 1,500; Referee: Viktor Shimusik (Osipovichi)

12 March 2017	Dinamo Minsk	2–2	Dinamo Brest	Minsk
16:15	Premudrov 11'; Galović 40'	Report	Fameyeh 49'; Shvyatsow 56' (o.g.)	Stadium: FC Minsk Stadium; Attendance: 1,700; Referee: Vladimir Ischenko (Rechitsa)

15 March 2017	Torpedo-BelAZ Zhodino	1–0	Slutsk	Zhodino
17:00	Makas 49'	Report		Stadium: Torpedo Stadium; Attendance: 750; Referee: Dmitry Dolya (Grodno)

15 March 2017	Minsk	0–1	BATE Borisov	Minsk
18:00		Report	Gordeichuk 5'	Stadium: FC Minsk Stadium; Attendance: 950; Referee: Sergey Tsinkevich (Osipovichi)

=== Second leg ===
18 March 2017	Shakhtyor Soligorsk	2–1 (5–1 agg.)	Lokomotiv Gomel (II)	Soligorsk
16:00	Khizhnichenko 57' (pen.); Yanush 59'	Report	Kleschenok 55'	Stadium: Shakhtyor Stadium; Attendance: 600; Referee: Nikita Pyreyev (Minsk)

18 March 2017	Dinamo Brest	0–0 ((a) 2–2 agg.)	Dinamo Minsk	Brest
20:00		Report		Stadium: OSK Brestsky; Attendance: 7,300; Referee: Aleksei Kulbakov (Gomel)

19 March 2017	Slutsk	2–0 (2–1 agg.)	Torpedo-BelAZ Zhodino	Bobruisk
16:00	Yusov 60'; Shcherba 81' (o.g.)	Report		Stadium: Aleksandr Prokopenko Stadium; Attendance: 1,070; Referee: Denis Scherbakov (Minsk)

19 March 2017	BATE Borisov	2–1 (3–1 agg.)	Minsk	Borisov
19:00	Yusov 40'; Rodionov 67'	Report	Ostojić 61' (o.g.)	Stadium: Borisov Arena; Attendance: 4,448; Referee: Vitaly Sevostyanik (Grodno)

== Semi-finals ==
The draw was made on 20 March 2017. The matches were played on 5 and 26 April 2017.

Team 1	Agg.	Team 2	1st leg	2nd leg
Slutsk	2–3	Shakhtyor Soligorsk	1–2	1–1
Dinamo Brest	2–1	BATE Borisov	2–0	0–1

=== First leg ===
5 April 2017	Slutsk	1–2	Shakhtyor Soligorsk	Slutsk
17:30	Yusov 20'	Report	Yanush 12'; Bagarić 25'	Stadium: City Stadium; Attendance: 1,810; Referee: Dmitry Dmitriyev (Fanipol)

5 April 2017	Dinamo Brest	2–0	BATE Borisov	Brest
19:30	Torres 2'; Fameyeh 58'	Report		Stadium: OSK Brestsky; Attendance: 9,200; Referee: Denis Scherbakov (Minsk)

=== Second leg ===
26 April 2017	Shakhtyor Soligorsk	1–1 (3–2 agg.)	Slutsk	Soligorsk
18:00	Soiri 31'	Report	Sebai 85'	Stadium: Stroitel Stadium; Attendance: 1,200; Referee: Igor Kruk (Molodechno)

26 April 2017	BATE Borisov	1–0 (1–2 agg.)	Dinamo Brest	Borisov
20:30	Ivanić 64'	Report		Stadium: Borisov Arena; Attendance: 4,618; Referee: Sergey Tsinkevich (Osipovichi)

== Final ==
The winners of the semifinals met on 28 May 2017 at the Neman Stadium in Grodno.

28 May 2017
17:00

Dinamo Brest	1–1 (a.e.t.)	Shakhtyor Soligorsk
Lyahchylin 82'	Report	Lisakovich 69'
Penalties
Aliseiko (penalty scored); Torres (penalty scored); Sedko (penalty scored); Afoakwa (penalty scored); Fameyeh (penalty scored); Lyahchylin (penalty scored); Lebedzew (penalty scored); Vitus (penalty scored); Avrămia (penalty scored); Mazalewski (penalty scored)	10–9	(penalty scored) Rybak; (penalty scored) Alyakhnovich; (penalty scored) Lisakovich; (penalty scored) Yanush; (penalty scored) Crepulja; (penalty scored) Burko; (penalty scored) Matsveychyk; (penalty scored) Kavalyow; (penalty scored) Aleksiyevich; (penalty missed) Yanushkevich

Neman Stadium, Grodno
Attendance: 8479
Referee: Aleksei Kulbakov (Gomel)

DINAMO:
GK	67	(France) Jérémy Malherbe
RB	16	(Belarus) Dmitry Aliseiko
CB	65	(Romania) Adrian Avrămia	(yellow card) 53'
CB	5	(Belarus) Andrey Lebedzew
LB	13	(Belarus) Maksim Vitus	(yellow card) 114'
DM	46	(Belarus) Alyaksey Lyahchylin
DM	8	(Belarus) Mikita Bukatkin (c)		(substituted off) 77'
RM	10	(Belarus) Maksim Chizh		(substituted off) 74'
CM	99	(Nigeria) Chidi Osuchukwu		(substituted off) 106'
LM	23	(Argentina) Leandro Torres	(yellow card) 28'
FW	20	(Ghana) Joel Fameyeh
Substitutes:
GK	35	(Belarus) Vladislav Khvin
FW	10	(Belarus) Raman Vasilyuk
MF	17	(Belarus) Pavel Sedko	(yellow card) 96'	(substituted on) 77'
FW	18	(Belarus) Dzmitry Mazalewski		(substituted on) 74'
FW	45	(Ghana) Dickson Afoakwa		(substituted on) 106'
MF	95	(Belarus) Dzmitry Barysaw
DF	97	(Belarus) Alyaksey Ivanow
Manager:
(Belarus) Uladzimir Zhuravel

SHAKHTYOR:
GK	1	(Belarus) Uladzimir Bushma	(yellow card) 20'
RB	6	(Belarus) Ihar Burko
CB	5	(Belarus) Alyaksey Yanushkevich
CB	18	(Belarus) Pavel Rybak (c)	(yellow card) 107'
LB	3	(Belarus) Syarhey Matsveychyk	(yellow card) 85'
DM	7	(Belarus) Edhar Alyakhnovich
DM	14	(Croatia) Ljuban Crepulja
RM	11	(Croatia) Dražen Bagarić		(substituted off) 76'
CM	9	(Belarus) Illya Aleksiyevich
LM	17	(Finland) Pyry Soiri		(substituted off) 52'
FW	15	(Belarus) Dzyanis Laptsew		(substituted off) 81'
Substitutes:
GK	73	(Bulgaria) Ivan Karadzhov
MF	8	(Belarus) Aleksandr Selyava
FW	10	(Belarus) Mikalay Yanush		(substituted on) 81'
DF	20	(Belarus) Aleksandr Poznyak
MF	23	(Belarus) Yury Kavalyow		(substituted on) 76'
FW	91	(Kazakhstan) Sergei Khizhnichenko
FW	99	(Belarus) Vitaly Lisakovich		(substituted on) 52'
Manager:
(Belarus) Oleg Kubarev
