= 2017 Belarusian First League =

Belarusian First League
- Season: 2017
- Champions: Luch Minsk
- Promoted: Luch Minsk; Smolevichi-STI
- Relegated: Osipovichi; Neman-Agro Stolbtsy
- Matches: 239
- Goals: 676 (2.83 per match)
- Top goalscorer: Yury Kazlow (16 goals)
- Biggest home win: Luch 9–0 Osipovichi
- Biggest away win: Neman-Agro 2–10 Belshina
- Highest scoring: Neman-Agro 2–10 Belshina

The 2017 Belarusian First League was the 27th season of 2nd level football in Belarus. It started in April and finished in November 2017.

== Team changes from 2016 season ==
Two best teams of 2016 Belarusian First League (Gomel and Dnepr Mogilev) were promoted to Belarusian Premier League. They were replaced by two lowest placed teams of 2016 Belarusian Premier League table (Belshina Bobruisk and Granit Mikashevichi).

Oshmyany, who finished 14th last year, relegated to the Second League. Due to First League expansion to 16 teams, they were replaced by three best teams of 2016 Second League (Volna Pinsk, Osipovichi and Kletsk). Kletsk eventually withdrew from participation due to club's lack of financing and infrastructure, and was replaced by Second League 4th placed team Neman-Agro Stolbtsy.

Before the start of the season Gomelzheldortrans changed their name to Lokomotiv Gomel, Slonim to Slonim-2017 and Zvezda-BGU Minsk to Energetik-BGU Minsk.

== Teams summary ==
Location of teams in 2017 Belarusian First League

Team	Location	Position in 2016
Belshina Bobruisk	Bobruisk	Premier League, 15
Granit Mikashevichi	Mikashevichi	Premier League, 16
Lokomotiv Gomel	Gomel	3
Luch Minsk	Minsk	4
Smorgon	Smorgon	5
Lida	Lida	6
Orsha	Orsha	7
Smolevichi-STI	Smolevichi	8
Torpedo Minsk	Minsk	9
Energetik-BGU Minsk	Minsk	10
Slonim-2017	Slonim	11
Khimik Svetlogorsk	Svetlogorsk	12
Baranovichi	Baranovichi	13
Volna Pinsk	Pinsk	Second League, 1
Osipovichi	Osipovichi	Second League, 2
Neman-Agro Stolbtsy	Stolbtsy	Second League, 4

== League table ==
Pos	Team	Pld	W	D	L	GF	GA	GD	Pts	Promotion or relegation
1	Luch Minsk (Note: Luch Minsk were deducted 10 points before the start of the season as a result of match-fixing investigation in the previous season.) (P)	30	22	7	1	73	22	+51	63	Promotion to the Belarusian Premier League
2	Smolevichi-STI (P)	30	18	4	8	46	22	+24	58	Promotion to the Belarusian Premier League
3	Torpedo Minsk	30	17	6	7	60	29	+31	57	
4	Lokomotiv Gomel	30	17	6	7	49	36	+13	57	
5	Belshina Bobruisk (Note: Belshina Bobruisk were deducted 2 points before the start of the season due to transfer irregularities in the previous season.)	30	14	7	9	56	30	+26	47	
6	Energetik-BGU Minsk	30	12	8	10	39	30	+9	44	
7	Volna Pinsk	30	13	4	13	48	48	0	43	
8	Granit Mikashevichi (Note: Granit Mikashevichi were deducted 3 points before the start of the season due to transfer irregularities in the previous season. Another 3 points were deducted in October for failing to comply with earlier resolutions.)	30	14	4	12	42	37	+5	40	
9	Khimik Svetlogorsk	30	9	10	11	35	42	−7	37	
10	Orsha	30	10	7	13	48	48	0	37	
11	Slonim-2017	30	10	7	13	33	46	−13	37	
12	Baranovichi	30	7	10	13	34	47	−13	31	
13	Smorgon	30	6	11	13	34	50	−16	29	
14	Lida	30	6	10	14	28	39	−11	28	
15	Osipovichi (R)	30	6	7	17	30	62	−32	25	Relegation to the Belarusian Second League
16	Neman-Agro Stolbtsy (R)	30	3	4	23	27	94	−67	13	Relegation to the Belarusian Second League

Source: football.by
Rules for classification: 1) Points; 2) Head-to-head points; 3) Head-to-head matches won; 4) Head-to-head goal difference; 5) Head-to-head goals scored; 6) Goal difference; 7) Matches won; 8) Goals scored.
(P) Promoted; (R) Relegated

== Results ==
Home \ Away	BAR	BSH	ENE	GRA	KHI	LID	LGM	LCH	NST	ORS	OSI	SLO	SML	SMR	TMN	VOL
Baranovichi	—	1–0	0–1	1–1	1–1	3–2	1–4	2–4	3–1	1–1	1–1	0–1	0–1	0–1	0–3	3–0
Belshina Bobruisk	0–3	—	1–0	1–2	0–0	2–1	1–2	1–2	7–0	3–1	3–0	0–0	1–0	4–1	0–0	4–0
Energetik-BGU Minsk	1–1	3–1	—	0–2	6–2	1–0	1–1	0–0	8–2	1–1	2–1	3–1	0–1	1–2	1–0	1–1
Granit Mikashevichi	2–1	2–1	0–0	—	2–1	1–1	0–3	3–1	2–1	0–1	2–0	1–3	0–1	4–1	1–2	0–1
Khimik Svetlogorsk	0–0	1–3	3–0	0–3	—	1–1	1–1	1–2	2–0	4–2	2–0	0–0	0–2	1–1	2–0	2–2
Lida	0–0	0–2	0–1	2–0	1–0	—	1–2	0–2	2–0	0–0	3–1	1–1	1–0	1–1	1–1	0–1
Lokomotiv Gomel	3–0 (Note: Awarded 3–0 to Lokomotiv Gomel after Baranovichi did not show up for the game.)	1–0	0–3	1–1	0–0	4–1	—	0–2	3–0	2–2	3–0	1–0	1–1	1–0	0–3	2–0
Luch Minsk	6–1	1–1	1–1	1–0	4–1	1–0	3–1	—	4–0	3–2	9–0	2–1	1–0	1–1	2–0	6–1
Neman-Agro Stolbtsy	0–1	2–10	1–2	0–5	2–0	1–1	1–2	0–5	—	3–6	0–0	2–3	0–3	3–1	3–3	2–1
Orsha	0–0	0–1	1–0	2–0	2–0	3–1	5–1	1–2	3–0	—	2–4	1–2	1–3	0–2	1–1	0–1
Osipovichi	2–0	2–2	0–2	0–1	1–1	0–2	1–2	1–1	3–2	1–1	—	2–0	1–2	1–1	1–2	1–0
Slonim-2017	3–3	1–1	0–0	2–1	0–1	1–0	1–2	0–2	3–0	1–4	3–2	—	1–0	1–1	2–0	0–1
Smolevichi-STI	2–1	1–1	1–0	2–1	2–3	3–1	3–0	3–3	3–0	4–0	3–0	1–0	—	0–1	0–1	3–2
Smorgon	3–4	0–1	1–0	1–3	1–3	1–1	0–1	0–0	1–1	0–3	1–2	8–0	0–0	—	2–2	1–1
Torpedo Minsk	1–0	1–3	3–0 (Note: Match between Torpedo Minsk and Energetik-BGU Minsk (originally 0–0) awarded 3–0 to Torpedo as Energetik-BGU used an ineligible player.)	5–0	0–1	1–1	3–2	0–1	5–0	2–1	5–1	3–0	1–0	6–0	—	3–1
Volna Pinsk	2–2	2–1	2–0	1–2	3–1	4–2	1–3	0–1	2–0	5–1	4–1	3–2	0–1	4–0	2–3	—

Source: football.by
Legend: Blue = home team win; Yellow = draw; Red = away team win.

== Top goalscorers ==
Rank	Goalscorer	Team	Goals
1	(Belarus) Yury Kazlow	Luch Minsk	16
2	(Belarus) Valery Gorbachik	Smolevichi-STI	15
2	(Belarus) Leonid Khankevich	Luch Minsk	15
4	(Belarus) Aleksey Rudenok	Neman-Agro Stolbtsy / Smorgon	14
4	(Belarus) Aleksey Khodnevich	Orsha	14

Updated to games played on 11 November 2017
Source: football.by

== See also ==
- 2017 Belarusian Premier League
- 2016–17 Belarusian Cup
- 2017–18 Belarusian Cup
