= 2018 Belarusian Premier League =

Belarusian Premier League
- Season: 2018
- Dates: 30 March – 2 December 2018
- Champions: BATE Borisov
- Relegated: Smolevichi; Dnepr Mogilev
- Champions League: BATE Borisov
- Europa League: Shakhtyor Soligorsk; Dinamo Minsk
- Matches: 240
- Goals: 516 (2.15 per match)
- Top goalscorer: 15 – Pavel Savitski (Dinamo Brest)
- Biggest home win: Neman 6-0 Isloch
- Biggest away win: Gomel 0-6 Dinamo Brest
- Highest scoring: Minsk 6-1 Torpedo Minsk
- Longest winning run: BATE Borisov 8 games
- Longest unbeaten run: Shakhtyor Soligorsk 16 games
- Longest winless run: Dnepr Mogilev 24 games
- Longest losing run: Slutsk 8 games

The 2018 Belarusian Premier League was the 28th season of top-tier football in Belarus. BATE Borisov were the defending champions, having won their 12th consecutive league title and 14th overall last year, and successfully defended their crown.

== Teams ==
Locations of the 2018 Belarusian Premier League teams

The bottom two teams from the 2017 season (Slavia Mozyr and Naftan Novopolotsk) were relegated to the 2018 Belarusian First League. They were replaced by Luch Minsk and Smolevichi, champions and runners-up of the 2017 Belarusian First League respectively.

Before the start of the season, Krumkachy Minsk were excluded from the league, after repeatedly missing deadlines for providing necessary licensing documents and pay off the salary debts to the players. The decision was made final on 19 March. They were replaced by Torpedo Minsk (3rd placed team of 2017 Belarusian First League).

Team	Location	Stadium	Capacity
BATE Borisov	Borisov	Borisov Arena	13,121
Dinamo Brest	Brest	OSK Brestsky	10,162
Dinamo Minsk	Minsk	Dinamo Stadium	22,324
Dnepr Mogilev	Mogilev	Spartak Stadium	7,350
Gomel	Gomel	Central Stadium	14,307
Gorodeya	Gorodeya	Gorodeya Stadium	1,625
Isloch Minsk Raion	Minsk Raion	FC Minsk Stadium	3,000
Luch Minsk	Minsk	SOK Olimpiysky	1,500
Minsk	Minsk	FC Minsk Stadium	3,000
Neman Grodno	Grodno	Neman Stadium	8,479
Shakhtyor Soligorsk	Soligorsk	Stroitel Stadium	4,200
Slutsk	Slutsk	City Stadium (Slutsk)	1,896
Smolevichi	Smolevichi	FOK Oktyabrsky (Oktyabrsky)	780
Torpedo-BelAZ Zhodino	Zhodino	Torpedo Stadium	6,524
Torpedo Minsk	Minsk	FC Minsk Stadium	3,000
Vitebsk	Vitebsk	Vitebsky CSK	8,144

1. One game played at Yunost Stadium in Brest.
2. Six games played at Traktor Stadium and three games at FC Minsk Stadium.
3. Two games played at Aleksandr Prokopenko Stadium in Bobruisk.
4. One game played at FC Minsk Stadium.
5. One game played at Traktor Stadium.
6. One game played at Shakhtyor Stadium.
7. Two games played at Aleksandr Prokopenko Stadium in Bobruisk.
8. Two games played at Torpedo Stadium in Zhodino and one game at City Stadium in Borisov.
9. Four games played at Traktor Stadium, two games at SOK Olimpiysky and one at Dinamo Stadium.

== League table ==
Pos	Team	Pld	W	D	L	GF	GA	GD	Pts	Qualification or relegation
1	BATE Borisov (C)	30	23	4	3	55	24	+31	73	Qualification for the Champions League first qualifying round
2	Shakhtyor Soligorsk	30	19	7	4	45	14	+31	64	Qualification for the Europa League first qualifying round
3	Dinamo Minsk	30	18	9	3	41	17	+24	63	Qualification for the Europa League first qualifying round
4	Vitebsk	30	19	5	6	47	20	+27	62	Qualification for the Europa League first qualifying round
5	Torpedo-BelAZ Zhodino	30	16	7	7	36	18	+18	55	
6	Dinamo Brest	30	14	10	6	52	30	+22	52	
7	Neman Grodno	30	12	7	11	31	32	−1	43	
8	Slutsk	30	11	3	16	26	36	−10	36	
9	Gorodeya	30	9	7	14	31	33	−2	34	
10	Isloch Minsk Raion	30	8	9	13	20	37	−17	33	
11	Minsk	30	7	9	14	34	42	−8	30	
12	Gomel	30	7	7	16	16	36	−20	28	
13	Luch Minsk	30	4	12	14	24	44	−20	24 (Note: Head-to-head points: Luch 8, Torpedo 4, Smolevichi 3)	
14	Torpedo Minsk	30	6	6	18	20	41	−21	24	
15	Smolevichi (R)	30	5	9	16	21	39	−18	24	Relegation to the Belarusian First League
16	Dnepr Mogilev (R)	30	3	7	20	17	53	−36	16	Relegation to the Belarusian First League

Rules for classification: 1) Points; 2) Head-to-head points; 3) Head-to-head matches won; 4) Head-to-head goal difference; 5) Head-to-head goals scored; 6) Goal difference; 7) Matches won; 8) Goals scored; 9) Draw.
(C) Champions; (R) Relegated

== Results ==
Each team plays home-and-away once against every other team for a total of 30 matches played each.

Home \ Away	BAT	DBR	DMI	DNE	GOM	GRD	ISL	FCM	LUM	NEM	SHA	SMO	SLU	TZH	TMN	VIT
BATE Borisov	—	2–0	2–1	2–0	3–0	3–2	1–1	2–0	4–1	1–0	0–0	1–0	3–1	2–1	2–0	1–1
Dinamo Brest	1–3	—	1–1	1–1	0–0	5–2	3–1	2–1	2–1	1–0	1–3	2–2	4–0	2–0	2–0	3–1
Dinamo Minsk	0–1	1–1	—	2–1	2–1	0–2	0–0	1–0	3–2	1–0	0–0	2–0	2–0	2–1	1–0	1–1
Dnepr Mogilev	0–1	1–4	0–3	—	1–0	1–2	0–0	0–0	0–0	0–0	1–1	0–1	2–0	0–3	1–2	0–1
Gomel	0–1	0–6	0–0	2–0	—	2–0	1–2	0–2	1–0	0–2	0–3	0–2	0–0	0–0	0–0	1–3
Gorodeya	2–1	1–0	0–2	1–2	0–0	—	2–0	1–2	1–1	0–2	0–1	4–1	2–0	1–1	0–0	1–1
Isloch Minsk Raion	2–1	0–1	0–1	3–2	0–1	0–0	—	0–3	1–1	1–2	1–0	1–0	0–1	0–0	1–1	0–1
Minsk	0–2	3–3	3–3	4–0	0–2	0–5	0–1	—	3–1	1–2	0–0	0–0	0–2	0–0	6–1	1–3
Luch Minsk	1–2	1–1	1–3	2–0	1–0	1–1	1–1	0–0	—	1–2	1–1	1–1	0–3	1–3	3–1	0–2
Neman Grodno	2–3	0–3	0–2	0–0	2–0	1–0	6–0	2–2	0–0	—	0–1	1–1	0–3	1–0	1–0	1–1
Shakhtyor Soligorsk	3–0	0–0	0–0	3–1	2–1	1–0	3–0	4–0	4–0	1–0	—	1–0	0–1	1–0	1–0	2–1
Smolevichi	2–3	1–0	0–2	2–1	1–1	2–0	0–1	1–1	1–1	0–1	0–2	—	1–2	1–2	0–2	1–1
Slutsk	0–1	1–1	0–1	5–0	0–1	1–0	0–1	0–1	1–0	1–1	1–3	1–0	—	0–3	1–3	0–2
Torpedo-BelAZ Zhodino	2–2	2–0	0–0	1–0	1–0	0–1	2–1	2–1	0–0	3–0	1–0	1–0	2–0	—	1–0	2–0
Torpedo Minsk	0–3	1–1	0–3	3–0	1–2	1–0	1–1	1–0	0–1	0–1	2–3	0–0	0–1	0–2	—	0–1
Vitebsk	0–1	0–1	0–1	3–1	1–0	1–0	2–0	1–0	2–0	5–1	2–1	4–0	2–0	2–0	2–0	—

Source: Football Federation of Belarus (in Russian)
Legend: Blue = home team win; Yellow = draw; Red = away team win.

== Top goalscorers ==
Updated to games played on 2 December 2018
Source: football.by

Rank	Goalscorer	Team	Goals
1	(Belarus) Pavel Savitski	Dinamo Brest	15
2	(Belarus) Dzyanis Laptsew	Shakhtyor Soligorsk	12
3	(Belarus) Dzmitry Lebedzew	Gorodeya	11
3	(Belarus) Anton Matsveenka	Vitebsk	11
3	(Belarus) Yevgeniy Shikavka	Slutsk	11
3	(Belarus) Maksim Skavysh	BATE Borisov	11
3	(Belarus) Kiryl Vyarheychyk	Vitebsk	11
8	(Serbia) Bojan Dubajić	Gorodeya	10
9	(Albania) Elis Bakaj	Shakhtyor Soligorsk	9
9	(Belarus) Valery Gorbachik	Smolevichi/Torpedo-BelAZ	9

== See also ==
- 2018 Belarusian First League
- 2017–18 Belarusian Cup
- 2018–19 Belarusian Cup
