= 2016 Belarusian First League =

Belarusian First League
- Season: 2016
- Champions: Gomel
- Promoted: Gomel; Dnepr Mogilev
- Relegated: Oshmyany
- Matches: 182
- Goals: 479 (2.63 per match)
- Top goalscorer: (Russia) Murat Khotov (19 goals)

2016 Belarusian First League was the 26th season of 2nd level football in Belarus. It started in April and finished in November 2016.

== Team changes from 2015 season ==
Three best teams of 2015 Belarusian First League (Gorodeya, Isloch Minsk Raion and Krumkachy Minsk) were promoted to Belarusian Premier League. They were replaced by last-placed team of 2015 Belarusian Premier League table (Gomel).

Rechitsa-2014, who finished 16th last year, relegated to the Second League. To compensate for Premier League expansion, they were replaced by three best teams of 2015 Second League (Luch Minsk, Uzda and Torpedo Minsk).

Before the start of the season Bereza-2010 disbanded, while Kobrin and newly promoted Uzda did not receive First League license and were denied participation. Oshmyany, who finished 5th in 2015 Second League, were additionally promoted, while no other Second League club eligible for extra promotion applied for the license. As a result, the league was reduced to 14 clubs for 2016 season.

== Teams summary ==
Location of teams in 2016 Belarusian First League

Team	Location	Position in 2015
Gomel	Gomel	Premier League, 14
Dnepr	Mogilev	4
Smorgon	Smorgon	5
Lida	Lida	6
Smolevichi-STI	Smolevichi	7
Gomelzheldortrans	Gomel	8
Slonim	Slonim	9
Zvezda-BGU	Minsk	10
Khimik	Svetlogorsk	12
Baranovichi	Baranovichi	13
Orsha	Orsha	14
Luch	Minsk	Second League, 1
Torpedo	Minsk	Second League, 3
Oshmyany	Oshmyany	Second League, 5

== League table ==
Pos	Team	Pld	W	D	L	GF	GA	GD	Pts	Promotion or relegation
1	Gomel (P)	26	19	6	1	48	11	+37	63 (Note: Gomel placed above Dnepr Mogilev by better head-to-head record (1–0, 3–2).)	Promotion to the Belarusian Premier League
2	Dnepr Mogilev (Note: Dnepr Mogilev were deducted 1 point due to financial irregularities.) (P)	26	20	4	2	61	19	+42	63	Promotion to the Belarusian Premier League
3	Gomelzheldortrans	26	12	8	6	33	24	+9	44	
4	Luch Minsk (Note: Match between Oshmyany and Luch was annulled and awarded as 0–0 with no points given to either side.)	26	12	6	8	38	28	+10	41	
5	Smorgon	26	10	8	8	40	39	+1	38 (Note: Smorgon placed above Lida by better head-to-head record (3–0, 1–0).)	
6	Lida	26	11	5	10	26	33	−7	38	
7	Orsha	26	9	10	7	43	34	+9	37	
8	Smolevichi-STI	26	9	7	10	38	29	+9	34	
9	Torpedo Minsk	26	9	6	11	35	36	−1	33 (Note: Torpedo Minsk placed above Zvezda-BGU Minsk by better head-to-head record (4–1, 1–0).)	
10	Zvezda-BGU Minsk	26	9	6	11	33	41	−8	33	
11	Slonim	26	6	6	14	36	49	−13	24	
12	Khimik Svetlogorsk	26	6	5	15	26	49	−23	23	
13	Baranovichi	26	5	7	14	35	51	−16	22	
14	Oshmyany (R)	26	2	2	22	15	64	−49	7	Relegation to the Belarusian Second League

Source: football.by
Rules for classification: 1) Points; 2) Head-to-head points; 3) Head-to-head matches won; 4) Head-to-head goal difference; 5) Head-to-head goals scored; 6) Goal difference; 7) Matches won; 8) Goals scored.
(P) Promoted; (R) Relegated

== Results ==
Home \ Away	BAR	DNE	GOM	GZH	KHI	LID	LCH	ORS	OSH	SLO	SML	SMR	TMN	ZVE
Baranovichi		0–2	0–6	0–0	5–0	0–1	0–1	0–1	1–0	7–2	0–0	3–3	2–1	1–2
Dnepr Mogilev	2–0		0–1	4–0	1–1	2–2	1–0	4–0	5–4	2–1	4–2	4–0	0–0	4–0
Gomel	4–1	3–2		0–0	2–1	2–0	1–0	1–1	1–0	2–0	2–1	0–0	2–0	1–0
Gomelzheldortrans	1–1	1–4	0–0		4–0	2–1	0–0	2–1	2–0	3–1	0–0	0–2	1–0	3–0
Khimik Svetlogorsk	2–2	0–3	0–1	3–1		2–0	2–3	0–2	2–1	2–1	0–3	2–0	0–1	0–2
Lida	1–1	0–1	0–0	1–0	2–1		1–0	2–2	1–0	2–4	1–5	0–3	2–1	2–0
Luch Minsk	2–0	1–2	2–1	0–3 (Note: As a result of match fixing investigation, match between Luch and Gomelzheldortrans (originally 3–1) awarded 0–3 to Gomelzheldortrans, match between Oshmyany and Baranovichi (originally 1–1) awarded 0–3 to Baranovichi, match between Oshmyany and Luch (originally 3–3) annulled with no points given to either team.)	2–0	0–1		5–1	5–2	0–0	1–0	2–1	3–1	0–0
Orsha	3–1	0–2	2–3	1–1	1–1	2–1	0–1		7–0	2–0	0–0	5–1	2–2	0–0
Oshmyany	0–3	0–3	0–5	0–2	2–1	0–1	0–0	1–4		0–1	0–2	1–0	0–1	1–3
Slonim	4–1	0–2	0–2	1–2	1–1	0–1	2–2	0–0	4–0		1–6	2–2	3–0	2–2
Smolevichi-STI	2–2	0–1	0–4	0–1	3–0	1–1	0–2	2–2	4–0	2–1		0–1	2–1	1–0
Smorgon	4–2	2–3	0–2	2–2	3–1	1–0	2–2	3–0	0–0	2–1	1–0		1–2	4–4
Torpedo Minsk	3–2	1–1	0–1	0–1	1–1	1–2	4–2	1–1	3–2	4–1	2–2	0–1		4–1
Zvezda-BGU Minsk	4–0	0–2	1–1	2–1	2–3	2–0	3–2	0–3	3–1	0–3	1–0	1–1	0–1	

Source: football.by
Legend: Blue = home team win; Yellow = draw; Red = away team win.

== Top goalscorers ==
Rank	Goalscorer	Team	Goals
1	(Russia) Murat Khotov	Dnepr Mogilev	19
2	(Belarus) Aleksey Khodnevich	Orsha	16
3	(Belarus) Yawhen Barsukow	Gomel	10
4	(Belarus) Syarhey Krot	Smorgon	9
4	(Belarus) Dmitry Gomza	Gomel	9
4	(Belarus) Alyaksandr Anufryyew	Smolevichi-STI	9
4	(Belarus) Pavel Rassolko	Luch Minsk	9
4	(Belarus) Fedor Sapon	Torpedo Minsk	9

Updated to games played on 6 November 2016
Source: football.by

== See also ==
- 2016 Belarusian Premier League
- 2015–16 Belarusian Cup
- 2016–17 Belarusian Cup
