= 2015 Belarusian First League =

Football league season

Belarusian First League
- Season: 2015
- Champions: Isloch Minsk Raion
- Promoted: Isloch Minsk Raion; Gorodeya; Krumkachy Minsk
- Relegated: Rechitsa-2014
- Matches: 239
- Goals: 742 (3.1 per match)
- Top goalscorer: (Russia) Aleksandr Alumona (20 goals)

The 2015 Belarusian First League is the 25th season of 2nd level football in Belarus. It started in April and finished in November 2015.

== Team changes from 2014 season ==
Two best teams of 2014 Belarusian First League (Granit Mikashevichi and Slavia Mozyr) were promoted to Belarusian Premier League. No team has relegated from Premier League directly due to its expansion from 12 to 14 clubs.

Last season's third-placed team Vitebsk won the promotion/relegation play-offs against Dnepr Mogilev (last team of Premier League) and were also promoted to Premier League. Dnepr Mogilev replaced Vitebsk in the First League

Volna Pinsk, who finished 16th last year, relegated to the Second League. To compensate for Premier League expansion, they were replaced by three best teams of 2014 Second League (Baranovichi, Krumkachy Minsk and Orsha).

Before the start of the season, FC Minsk announced that their farm-club Minsk-2 will be folded. Kobrin, who finished 5th in 2014 Second League, were invited to replace Minsk-2 (after Zhlobin, who finished 4th in Second League, declined invitation).

== Teams summary ==
Location of teams in 2015 Belarusian First League

Team	Location	Position in 2014
Dnepr Mogilev	Mogilev	Premier League, 12
Smorgon	Smorgon	4
Rechitsa-2014	Rechitsa	5
Gorodeya	Gorodeya	6
Isloch	Minsk Raion	7
Khimik	Svetlogorsk	8
Zvezda-BGU	Minsk	9
Smolevichi-STI	Smolevichi	10
Gomelzheldortrans	Gomel	11
Bereza-2010	Bereza	12
Lida	Lida	14
Slonim	Slonim	15
Baranovichi	Baranovichi	Second League, 1
Krumkachy	Minsk	Second League, 2
Orsha	Orsha	Second League, 3
Kobrin	Kobrin	Second League, 5

== League table ==
Pos	Team	Pld	W	D	L	GF	GA	GD	Pts	Promotion or relegation
1	Isloch Minsk Raion (P)	30	20	9	1	76	24	+52	69	Promotion to the Belarusian Premier League
2	Gorodeya (P)	30	21	5	4	73	25	+48	68	Promotion to the Belarusian Premier League
3	Krumkachy Minsk (P)	30	19	3	8	67	45	+22	60	Promotion to the Belarusian Premier League
4	Dnepr Mogilev	30	17	5	8	48	21	+27	56	
5	Smorgon	30	15	8	7	60	41	+19	53	
6	Lida	30	15	5	10	60	53	+7	50	
7	Smolevichi-STI	30	13	8	9	47	37	+10	47	
8	Gomelzheldortrans	30	12	8	10	45	39	+6	44	
9	Slonim	30	13	2	15	41	55	−14	41	
10	Zvezda-BGU Minsk	30	10	10	10	47	47	0	40	
11	Bereza-2010	30	10	4	16	39	43	−4	34	
12	Khimik Svetlogorsk	30	9	7	14	42	50	−8	34	
13	Baranovichi	30	8	8	14	36	49	−13	32	
14	Orsha	30	3	8	19	24	70	−46	17	
15	Kobrin	30	4	3	23	23	77	−54	15	
16	Rechitsa-2014 (R)	30	2	5	23	14	66	−52	11	Relegation to the Belarusian Second League

Source: football.by
Rules for classification: 1) Points; 2) Head-to-head points; 3) Head-to-head matches won; 4) Head-to-head goal difference; 5) Head-to-head goals scored; 6) Goal difference; 7) Matches won; 8) Goals scored.
(P) Promoted; (R) Relegated

== Results ==
Home \ Away	BAR	BER	DNE	GZH	GRD	ISL	KHI	KOB	KRU	LID	ORS	RCH	SLO	SML	SMR	ZVE
Baranovichi		3–1	0–4	1–0	0–3	2–2	0–1	1–0	0–2	0–3	5–1	0–0	1–2	1–2	1–1	2–2
Bereza-2010	2–1		0–1	0–2	1–2	0–2	0–0	1–1	0–2	3–2	2–0	3–0	1–4	1–1	0–1	1–1
Dnepr Mogilev	4–1	3–0		0–0	1–0	0–1	0–1	3–1	4–0	1–2	2–1	1–0	3–1	0–2	0–1	0–0
Gomelzheldortrans	2–1	1–0	0–0		2–3	0–4	3–1	3–0	3–3	2–3	1–1	2–0	1–2	1–0	1–1	4–1
Gorodeya	2–3	1–0	2–2	1–1		4–0	1–1	4–1	6–1	1–2	4–0	2–0	3–0	2–0	6–1	1–0
Isloch Minsk Raion	2–2	2–0	2–1	2–1	1–1		4–0	6–0	3–2	2–2	3–0	4–0	2–0	3–2	1–1	1–1
Khimik Svetlogorsk	0–1	2–4	3–1	2–0	1–2	0–2		2–0	0–2	1–2	4–0	3–1	2–3	0–0	2–3	4–2
Kobrin	2–2	1–2	0–1	0–1	0–1	0–7	3–1		1–0	3–0	1–1	1–3	0–2	1–2	1–3	2–0
Krumkachy Minsk	2–1	2–1	2–0	8–3	0–3	2–3	3–3	3–0		2–0	2–1	7–0	2–1	0–3	4–2	2–2
Lida	0–0	1–2	0–3	0–3	0–4	0–3	2–2	7–2	0–3		2–1	2–0	6–4	3–0	4–6	2–0
Orsha	0–0	1–8	0–2	0–4	0–4	0–4	1–2	3–0 (Note: Awarded to Orsha as Kobrin did not show up for the game.)	0–1	2–2		3–0	0–2	1–1	1–1	3–0
Rechitsa-2014	1–3	0–2	0–1	0–1	0–1	0–4	1–1	3–1	1–2	1–1	0–0		0–2	0–4	0–4	1–1
Slonim	1–0	0–1	0–5	0–0	1–2	0–3	3–1	2–1	0–4	0–4	3–0	2–1		0–1	1–1	0–1
Smolevichi-STI	1–2	2–1	1–3	2–1	3–3	0–0	1–0	5–0	0–1	0–4	3–3	2–0	1–2		4–2	1–1
Smorgon	2–0	1–0	0–0	1–0	1–3	0–0	1–1	1–0	4–1	2–3	6–0	4–1	5–1	0–2		0–2
Zvezda-BGU Minsk	4–2	3–2	0–2	2–2	2–1	3–3	4–1	7–0	0–2	0–1	1–0	2–0	3–2	1–1	1–4	

Source: football.by
Legend: Blue = home team win; Yellow = draw; Red = away team win.

== Top goalscorers ==
Rank	Goalscorer	Team	Goals
1	(Russia) Aleksandr Alumona	Isloch Minsk Raion	20
2	(Belarus) Dzmitry Lebedzew	Gorodeya	19
2	(Belarus) Aleksey Khodnevich	Zvezda-BGU Minsk / Smolevichi-STI	19
4	(Belarus) Syarhey Koshal	Krumkachy Minsk	17
5	(Belarus) Yevgeniy Shikavka	Krumkachy Minsk	16
5	(Belarus) Uladzimir Shakaw	Slonim	16

Updated to games played on 15 November 2015
Source: football.by

== See also ==
- 2015 Belarusian Premier League
- 2014–15 Belarusian Cup
- 2015–16 Belarusian Cup
