= 2018 Belarusian First League =

Belarusian First League
- Season: 2018
- Champions: Slavia Mozyr
- Promoted: Slavia Mozyr; Energetik-BGU Minsk
- Relegated: Chist
- Matches: 210
- Goals: 556 (2.65 per match)
- Top goalscorer: Vsevolod Sadovsky (19 goals)

2018 Belarusian First League is the 28th season of 2nd level football in Belarus. It started in April and finished in November 2018.

== Team changes from 2017 season ==
Two best teams of 2017 Belarusian First League (Luch Minsk and Smolevichi-STI) were promoted to Belarusian Premier League. They were replaced by two lowest placed teams of 2017 Belarusian Premier League table (Slavia Mozyr and Naftan Novopolotsk).

Two lowest placed teams of the last season (Osipovichi and Neman-Agro Stolbtsy) relegated to the Second League. They were replaced by two best teams of 2017 Second League (UAS Zhitkovichi and Chist).

In March 2018, Torpedo Minsk were granted additional promotion to Belarusian Premier League to replace Krumkachy Minsk (who failed to obtain a Premier League and were demoted to the Second League). Torpedo were not replaced any other team due to the lack of applicants, and the league was reduced to 15 clubs for the season.

== Teams summary ==
Location of teams in 2018 Belarusian First League

Team	Location	Position in 2017
Slavia Mozyr	Mozyr	Premier League, 15
Naftan Novopolotsk	Novopolotsk	Premier League, 16
Lokomotiv Gomel	Gomel	4
Belshina Bobruisk	Bobruisk	5
Energetik-BGU Minsk	Minsk	6
Volna Pinsk	Pinsk	7
Granit Mikashevichi	Mikashevichi	8
Khimik Svetlogorsk	Svetlogorsk	9
Orsha	Orsha	10
Slonim-2017	Slonim	11
Baranovichi	Baranovichi	12
Smorgon	Smorgon	13
Lida	Lida	14
UAS Zhitkovichi	Zhitkovichi	Second League, 1
Chist	Chist	Second League, 2

== League table ==
Pos	Team	Pld	W	D	L	GF	GA	GD	Pts	Promotion or relegation
1	Slavia Mozyr (P)	28	21	7	0	69	13	+56	70	Promotion to the Belarusian Premier League
2	Energetik-BGU Minsk (P)	28	21	4	3	69	23	+46	67	Promotion to the Belarusian Premier League
3	Belshina Bobruisk	28	18	5	5	59	23	+36	59	
4	Lida	28	18	4	6	45	18	+27	58	
5	Naftan Novopolotsk	28	10	11	7	28	24	+4	41	
6	Lokomotiv Gomel	28	10	10	8	44	29	+15	40	
7	Slonim-2017	28	9	9	10	37	37	0	36	
8	Granit Mikashevichi (Note: Granit were deducted 1 point due to delayed salary payments.)	28	8	11	9	28	34	−6	34	
9	Khimik Svetlogorsk	28	9	5	14	32	40	−8	32	
10	UAS Zhitkovichi	28	6	10	12	23	38	−15	28	
11	Smorgon	28	6	10	12	19	44	−25	28	
12	Orsha	28	8	3	17	33	53	−20	27	
13	Volna Pinsk	28	6	7	15	23	49	−26	25	
14	Baranovichi	28	4	7	17	17	42	−25	19	
15	Chist (R)	28	1	7	20	30	89	−59	10	Relegation to the Belarusian Second League

Source: football.by
Rules for classification: 1) Points; 2) Head-to-head points; 3) Head-to-head matches won; 4) Head-to-head goal difference; 5) Head-to-head goals scored; 6) Goal difference; 7) Matches won; 8) Goals scored.
(P) Promoted; (R) Relegated

== Results ==
Home \ Away	BAR	BSH	CHI	ENE	GRA	KHI	LID	LGM	NAF	ORS	SLA	SLO	SMR	UAS	VOL
Baranovichi	—	1–2	2–1	0–1	1–2	0–2	0–1	0–0	0–0	0–1	1–3	0–0	0–1	0–0	1–2
Belshina Bobruisk	5–1	—	5–0	1–1	2–0	2–0	1–0	2–1	1–1	2–1	0–2	2–1	2–0	2–1	6–0
Chist	0–1	0–5	—	0–7	2–2	1–4	1–2	0–6	1–3	2–3	1–6	1–5	2–4	0–0	3–1
Energetik-BGU Minsk	3–1	2–2	5–1	—	3–1	3–0	2–1	3–0	0–0	4–0	2–2	2–1	3–0	5–1	2–1
Granit Mikashevichi	0–0	0–1	3–3	0–4	—	4–1	0–3	2–0	1–3	1–0	0–3	1–2	0–0	0–0	0–0
Khimik Svetlogorsk	3–0	1–3	3–0 (Note: Chist were awarded a 0–3 loss for not showing up for away game against Khimik Svetlogorsk.)	2–0	0–1	—	0–0	1–4	2–2	3–2	0–2	3–0	1–1	1–1	0–1
Lida	2–1	0–0	3–0	3–0 (Note: Match between Lida and Energetik-BGU Minsk (originally 0–1) awarded 3–0 to Lida as Energetik-BGU used a suspended player.)	1–2	4–0	—	2–0	1–0	2–0	0–2	0–1	3–0	1–1	4–1
Lokomotiv Gomel	4–0	3–2	5–2	1–3	1–1	2–0	0–0	—	0–2	0–2	0–0	3–0	0–1	3–1	3–0
Naftan Novopolotsk	1–1	1–0	2–2	0–1	1–1	1–0	0–1	1–1	—	1–0	0–1	0–0	1–0	1–2	2–1
Orsha	1–3	2–1	5–2	0–1	0–3	2–0	0–1	0–3	1–3	—	1–5	2–2	0–0	1–2	3–0
Slavia Mozyr	2–0	3–0	1–1	2–0	1–1	2–2	3–0	0–0	4–0	6–2	—	3–1	6–0	2–0	2–0
Slonim-2017	0–0	1–1	1–0	1–4	1–1	0–1	1–2	2–2	1–0	2–0	1–4	—	1–2	0–0	1–1
Smorgon	1–0	0–3	1–0	1–4	0–0	0–2	1–3	1–1	1–1	1–2	0–0	0–5	—	1–1	0–0
UAS Zhitkovichi	0–1	0–5	2–2	1–2	0–1	1–0	1–2	1–1	0–0	2–1	0–1	1–2	1–0	—	1–2
Volna Pinsk	4–2	0–1	2–2	0–2	1–0	1–0	0–3	0–0	0–1	1–1	0–1	1–4	2–2	1–2	—

Source: football.by
Legend: Blue = home team win; Yellow = draw; Red = away team win.

== Top goalscorers ==
Rank	Goalscorer	Team	Goals
1	(Belarus) Vsevolod Sadovsky	Energetik-BGU Minsk	21
2	(Belarus) Dmitry Gomza	Belshina Bobruisk	17
3	(Belarus) Yevgeniy Yudchits	Energetik-BGU Minsk	13
3	(Ukraine) Maksym Slyusar	Slavia Mozyr	13
5	(Belarus) Dmitry Baiduk	Belshina Bobruisk	11

Updated to games played on 10 November 2018
Source: football.by

== See also ==
- 2018 Belarusian Premier League
- 2017–18 Belarusian Cup
- 2018–19 Belarusian Cup
