= 2017 Belarusian Premier League =

Belarusian Premier League
- Season: 2017
- Dates: 1 April – 26 November 2017
- Champions: BATE Borisov
- Relegated: Slavia Mozyr; Naftan Novopolotsk; Krumkachy Minsk
- Champions League: BATE Borisov
- Europa League: Dinamo Minsk; Shakhtyor Soligorsk; Dynamo Brest
- Matches: 223
- Goals: 496 (2.22 per match)
- Top goalscorer: 17 – Mikhail Gordeichuk (BATE)
- Biggest home win: BATE 6–0 Slutsk
- Biggest away win: Slavia 0–6 BATE
- Highest scoring: Slavia 0–6 BATE; BATE 6–0 Slutsk
- All statistics correct as of 5 November 2017.

The 2017 Belarusian Premier League was the 27th season of top-tier football in Belarus. The season began on 1 April 2017 and ended on 26 November 2017. BATE Borisov were the defending champions, having won their 11th consecutive league title and 13th overall last year, and successfully defended their crown.

== Teams ==
Locations of the 2017 Belarusian Premier League teams

The bottom two teams from the 2016 season, Granit Mikashevichi and Belshina Bobruisk, were relegated to the 2017 Belarusian First League. They were replaced by Gomel and Dnepr Mogilev, champions and runners-up of the 2016 Belarusian First League respectively.

Team	Location	Stadium	Capacity
BATE	Borisov	Borisov Arena	13,126
Dinamo Brest	Brest	OSK Brestsky	10,162
Dinamo Minsk	Minsk	Traktor Stadium	17,600
Dnepr Mogilev	Mogilev	Spartak Stadium	7,350
Gomel	Gomel	Central Stadium	14,307
Gorodeya	Gorodeya	Gorodeya Stadium	1,625
Isloch Minsk Raion	Minsk	FC Minsk Stadium	3,000
Krumkachy Minsk	Minsk	FC Minsk Stadium	3,000
Minsk	Minsk	FC Minsk Stadium	3,000
Naftan Novopolotsk	Novopolotsk	Atlant Stadium	4,500
Neman Grodno	Grodno	Neman Stadium	8,479
Shakhtyor Soligorsk	Soligorsk	Stroitel Stadium	4,200
Slavia Mozyr	Mozyr	Yunost Stadium	5,133
Slutsk	Slutsk	City Stadium	1,896
Torpedo-BelAZ Zhodino	Zhodino	Torpedo Stadium	6,524
Vitebsk	Vitebsk	Vitebsky CSK	8,144

1. One game played at RCOP-BGU Stadium and one game at FC Minsk Stadium.
2. Seven games played at Traktor Stadium.

== League table ==
Pos	Team	Pld	W	D	L	GF	GA	GD	Pts	Qualification or relegation
1	BATE Borisov (Note: Slutsk was awarded a 3–0 win over BATE Borisov, which originally won 6-0. However the BFF canceled the decision of the Disciplinary Committee on October 12 following BATE appeal.) (C)	30	21	5	4	61	19	+42	68 (Note: BATE Borisov is ahead of Dinamo Minsk on head-to-head record: BATE Borisov 1–0 Dinamo Minsk, Dinamo Minsk 0–1 BATE Borisov.)	Qualification for the Champions League second qualifying round
2	Dinamo Minsk	30	22	2	6	46	15	+31	68	Qualification for the Europa League first qualifying round
3	Shakhtyor Soligorsk	30	20	5	5	52	22	+30	65	Qualification for the Europa League first qualifying round
4	Dinamo Brest	30	14	9	7	47	26	+21	51 (Note: Dinamo Brest is ahead of Torpedo-BelAZ Zhodino on head-to-head record: Dinamo Brest 1–0 Torpedo-BelAZ Zhodino, Torpedo-BelAZ Zhodino 1–1 Dinamo Brest.)	Qualification for the Europa League second qualifying round (Note: Dinamo Brest qualified for the Europa League second qualifying round by winning the 2017–18 Belarusian Cup.)
5	Torpedo-BelAZ Zhodino	30	14	9	7	43	27	+16	51	
6	Neman Grodno	30	14	7	9	42	32	+10	49	
7	Slutsk	30	12	8	10	30	34	−4	44	
8	Vitebsk	30	12	7	11	35	38	−3	43	
9	Gorodeya	30	8	14	8	37	35	+2	38	
10	Gomel	30	9	8	13	24	25	−1	35	
11	Isloch Minsk Raion (Note: Isloch Minsk Raion were deducted 7 points.)	30	10	4	16	27	46	−19	27	
12	Dnepr Mogilev	30	6	8	16	27	48	−21	26	
13	Krumkachy Minsk (Note: Krumkachy Minsk were excluded from the Premier League before the start of 2018 season after failing to provide necessary licensing documents and pay off the salary debts to the players. After a rejected appeal, the decision was made final on 19 March 2018.) (R)	30	5	10	15	26	47	−21	25	Relegation to the Belarusian Second League
14	Minsk	30	3	14	13	19	39	−20	23	
15	Slavia Mozyr (R)	30	4	8	18	26	50	−24	20	Relegation to the Belarusian First League
16	Naftan Novopolotsk (Note: Naftan Novopolotsk were deducted 5 points.) (R)	30	4	6	20	18	57	−39	13	Relegation to the Belarusian First League

Source: BFF (in Russian), Soccerway
Rules for classification: 1) Points; 2) Head-to-head points; 3) Head-to-head matches won; 4) Head-to-head goal difference; 5) Head-to-head goals scored; 6) Goal difference; 7) Matches won; 8) Goals scored; 9) Draw.
(C) Champions; (R) Relegated

== Results ==
Each team plays home-and-away once against every other team for a total of 30 matches played each.

Home \ Away	BAT	DBR	DMI	DNE	GOM	GRD	ISL	KRU	FCM	NAF	NEM	SHA	SVM	SLU	TZH	VIT
BATE Borisov	—	1–0	1–0	2–1	3–0	2–0	2–0	2–3	1–0	1–1	3–1	1–0	2–0	6–0	0–0	3–1
Dinamo Brest	1–1	—	1–0	3–0	3–0	1–1	4–1	3–0	4–0	2–0	0–2	2–2	3–1	0–0	1–0	2–0
Dinamo Minsk	0–1	1–0	—	2–1	1–0	4–2	1–0	1–0	1–0	1–0	1–0	2–2	0–0	2–0	1–0	1–3
Dnepr Mogilev	0–2	1–0	0–3	—	0–4	2–2	1–2	2–1	1–1	4–0	0–3	0–1	5–3	0–0	0–5	1–2
Gomel	1–1	0–1	0–1	0–0	—	0–0	0–1	2–0	2–1	3–1	2–2	0–0	2–0	0–1	0–1	0–1
Gorodeya	3–3	1–1	1–0	2–2	0–0	—	2–0	1–1	1–1	2–0	1–0	0–1	0–0	1–1	3–2	3–2
Isloch Minsk Raion	0–2	3–1	1–5	1–0	0–1	0–4	—	1–1	0–0	0–0	0–1	1–2	1–0	1–2	2–1	0–1
Krumkachy Minsk	2–3	1–1	0–1	0–0	0–1	0–3	2–0	—	2–1	2–2	2–2	0–2	1–1	1–1	0–3	1–0
Minsk	1–0	2–2	0–2	0–0	0–2	0–0	2–0	0–0	—	2–2	0–1	0–1	2–2	1–1	0–0	0–0
Naftan Novopolotsk	0–3	0–4	0–4	0–1	0–3	1–0	1–2	0–3	0–1	—	3–2	1–5	0–2	0–1	0–1	0–0
Neman Grodno	0–1	0–2	0–1	2–0	3–0	2–1	1–1	2–0	3–1	2–1	—	3–1	0–0	2–1	0–1	1–4
Shakhtyor Soligorsk	0–4	3–0	0–1	2–1	0–0	4–0	4–0	2–0	3–0	2–1	0–0	—	1–0	2–1	1–2	2–0
Slavia Mozyr	0–6	1–2	0–2	4–0	1–1	1–0	2–3	3–1	2–2	1–2	1–2	0–3	—	1–2	0–3	0–1
Slutsk	1–0	1–0	0–3	1–0	1–0	1–1	1–3	2–0	2–0	0–1	1–2	0–2	0–0	—	4–1	2–3
Torpedo-BelAZ Zhodino	2–4	1–1	1–0	0–0	1–0	3–2	2–1	3–0	1–1	1–1	1–1	1–2	2–0	1–1	—	2–0
Vitebsk	1–0	2–2	1–4	0–4	1–0	0–0	0–2	2–2	3–0	2–0	2–2	1–2	1–0	0–1	1–1	—

Source: Football Federation of Belarus (in Russian)
Legend: Blue = home team win; Yellow = draw; Red = away team win.

== Top goalscorers ==
Updated to the final standing
Source: football.by

Rank	Goalscorer	Team	Goals
1	(Belarus) Mikhail Gordeichuk	BATE Borisov	18
2	(Belarus) Pavel Savitski	Neman Grodno	15
3	(Serbia) Bojan Dubajić	Gorodeya	12
3	(Belarus) Anton Saroka	Dinamo Minsk	12
5	(Belarus) Yahor Zubovich	Torpedo-BelAZ Zhodino	11
6	(Belarus) Dzyanis Laptsew	Shakhtyor Soligorsk	10
6	(Argentina) Leandro Torres	Dinamo Brest	10
8	(Belarus) Uladzimir Khvashchynski	Dinamo Minsk	9
8	(Belarus) Maksim Skavysh	Torpedo-BelAZ Zhodino	9
10	(Brazil) Nivaldo Ferreira	Gomel/Dinamo Brest	8
10	(Belarus) Vitali Rodionov	BATE Borisov	8

== See also ==
- 2017 Belarusian First League
- 2016–17 Belarusian Cup
- 2017–18 Belarusian Cup
