= Ilya Tyunis =

Belarusian footballer

Personal information
- Full name: Ilya Valerevich Tyunis
- Date of birth: 4 July 1994 (age 32)
- Place of birth: Minsk, Belarus
- Height: 1.76 m (5 ft 9 in)
- Position: Attacking midfielder

Team information
- Current team: Osipovichi
- Number: 7

Youth career
- 2011–2012: Dinamo Minsk

Senior career*
Years	Team	Apps	(Gls)
2011–2012	Dinamo-2 Minsk	62	(12)
2013	Smorgon	9	(0)
2014–2015	Gorodeya	10	(0)
2015	→ Volna Pinsk (loan)	10	(1)
2016	Neman-Agro Stolbtsy	6	(1)
2016	Dinamo Vranje	2	(0)
2017	Pakruojis	22	(1)
2018–2019	Oshmyany	35	(10)
2019	Orsha	14	(0)
2020–2021	Viktoriya Maryina Gorka	18	(6)
2021	Uzda	8	(4)
2022–	Osipovichi	41	(4)
- * Club domestic league appearances and goals as of 31 December 2023

Ilya Tyunis (Belarusian: Ілля Цюніс; Russian: Илья Тюнис; born 4 July 1994) is a Belarusian football midfielder who plays for Osipovichi.

== Club career ==
Born in Minsk, Tyunis played with Smorgon, Gorodeya and Neman Stolbtsy in his home country between 2012 and 2016. In summer 2016, he joined Serbian side Dinamo Vranje. Tyunis made his Serbian First League debut for Dinamo Vranje in 4 fixture match of the 2016–17 season against OFK Odžaci, played on 4 September 2016. He left the club in 2017.
