= Aleksey Rudenok =

Belarusian footballer

Personal information
- Date of birth: 25 February 1993 (age 33)
- Place of birth: Stolbtsy, Minsk Oblast, Belarus
- Height: 1.81 m (5 ft 11 1/2 in)
- Position: Forward

Youth career
- DYuSSh Stolbtsy

Senior career*
| Years | Team | Apps | (Gls) |
| 2010–2011 | Gorodeya | 32 | (7) |
| 2012–2013 | Isloch Minsk Raion | 42 | (10) |
| 2014 | Rechitsa-2014 | 26 | (2) |
| 2015 | Kolos-Druzhba Gorodische | 6 | (0) |
| 2015 | Kletsk | 13 | (0) |
| 2016 | Krumkachy Minsk | 1 | (0) |
| 2017 | Neman-Agro Stolbtsy | 15 | (6) |
| 2017 | Smorgon | 15 | (8) |
| 2018–2019 | Isloch Minsk Raion | 28 | (1) |
| 2019 | NFK Minsk | 13 | (1) |

International career
| 2012 | Belarus U21 | 1 | (0) |
- * Club domestic league appearances and goals as of 31 December 2019

Aleksey Rudenok (Belarusian: Аляксей Рудзянок; Russian: Алексей Руденок; born 25 February 1993) is a Belarusian former professional footballer.

On 6 August 2020, the BFF banned Rudenok from Belarusian football for 2 years for his involvement in the match fixing.
