= Dmitry Asnin =

Belarusian footballer

Personal information
- Date of birth: 6 July 1984 (age 42)
- Place of birth: Brest, Belarusian SSR
- Height: 1.93 m (6 ft 4 in)
- Position: Goalkeeper

Team information
- Current team: Volna Pinsk (goalkeeping coach)

Youth career
- Dinamo Brest

Senior career*
Years	Team	Apps	(Gls)
2001	SKAF Minsk	4	(0)
2002	Dinamo Brest	0	(0)
2003–2004	Kommunalnik Slonim	24	(0)
2005	Darida Minsk Raion	1	(0)
2005–2006	Kommunalnik Slonim	10	(0)
2007	Mozyr	23	(0)
2008	Cresovia Siemiatycze		
2008	Kommunalnik Slonim	6	(0)
2009	Pogoń Siedlce	8	(0)
2009–2010	Stal Rzeszów	5	(0)
2010	Orzeł Wierzbica		
2011	Baranovichi	8	(0)
2012–2014	Lida	53	(0)
2015	Khimik Svetlogorsk	15	(0)
2016	Dinamo Brest	26	(0)
2017	Naftan Novopolotsk	13	(0)
2017	Gomel	3	(0)
2018	TC Sports Club	0	(0)
2018	PKR Svay Rieng		
2019	Rukh Brest	0	(0)
- * Club domestic league appearances and goals

Dmitry Asnin (Belarusian: Дзмітрый Аснін; Russian: Дмитрий Аснин; born 6 July 1984) is a Belarusian former professional footballer who played as a goalkeeper. He is currently the goalkeeping coach of Volna Pinsk.

== Honours ==
Dinamo Brest

- Belarusian Cup: 2016–17
