= Artem Volovich =

Belarusian professional footballer

Personal information
- Date of birth: 15 March 1999 (age 27)
- Place of birth: Minsk, Belarus
- Height: 1.80 m (5 ft 11 in)
- Position: Midfielder

Youth career
- 2014–2016: BATE Borisov
- 2017–2018: Gorodeya

Senior career*
Years	Team	Apps	(Gls)
2018–2020	Gorodeya	7	(0)
2019	→ NFK Minsk (loan)	23	(4)
2021	Osipovichi	20	(3)
- * Club domestic league appearances and goals as of 31 December 2021

Artem Volovich (Belarusian: Арцём Валовіч; Russian: Артём Волович; born 15 March 1999) is a Belarusian professional footballer.
