= Dmitry Aliseyko =

Belarusian footballer

Personal information
- Full name: Dmitry Aleksandrovich Aliseyko
- Date of birth: 28 August 1992 (age 34)
- Place of birth: Bobruisk, Mogilev Oblast, Belarus
- Height: 1.79 m (5 ft 10 1/2 in)
- Position: Defender

Team information
- Current team: Uzda

Youth career
- 2007–2009: Dinamo Minsk

Senior career*
Years	Team	Apps	(Gls)
2010–2012	Dinamo Minsk	0	(0)
2012	→ Torpedo-BelAZ Zhodino (loan)	1	(0)
2013–2014	Neman Grodno	15	(0)
2014	→ Slutsk (loan)	27	(5)
2015–2016	Slutsk	49	(3)
2017	Dinamo Brest	19	(2)
2018	Isloch Minsk Raion	21	(0)
2019	Khimki	14	(0)
2019–2020	Torpedo-BelAZ Zhodino	16	(0)
2021	Minsk	18	(2)
2022–2023	Ostrovets	52	(8)
2024	Dnepr Mogilev	24	(0)
2025–	Uzda		

International career^{‡}
2009–2011	Belarus U19	4	(0)
2012	Belarus U21	3	(0)
2017	Belarus	4	(0)
- * Club domestic league appearances and goals as of 4 December 2025 ‡ National team caps and goals as of 3 September 2017

Dmitry Aleksandrovich Aliseyko (Belarusian: Дзмітрый Аляксандравіч Алісейка; Russian: Дмитрий Александрович Алисейко; born 28 August 1992) is a Belarusian professional footballer who plays for Uzda.

== Career ==
Born in Bobruisk, Aliseyko began playing football in FC Dinamo Minsk youth system. He made his Belarusian Premier League debut with FC Torpedo-BelAZ Zhodino in 2012, before moving to FC Neman Grodno for the 2013 season.

== Honours ==
Dinamo Brest

- Belarusian Cup winner: 2016–17, 2017–18
