= Nikita Stepanov =

Belarusian footballer

Personal information
- Date of birth: 6 April 1996 (age 30)
- Place of birth: Smolevichi, Minsk Oblast, Belarus
- Height: 1.81 m (5 ft 11 in)
- Position: Midfielder

Team information
- Current team: Dinamo Brest
- Number: 18

Youth career
- 2012–2013: Smolevichi-STI

Senior career*
Years	Team	Apps	(Gls)
2013–2017	Smolevichi-STI	88	(3)
2017	→ Luch Minsk (loan)	13	(0)
2018	Luch Minsk	27	(0)
2019	Dnyapro Mogilev	27	(1)
2020	Torpedo-BelAZ Zhodino	10	(0)
2021	Neman Grodno	2	(0)
2021–2022	Isloch Minsk Raion	42	(3)
2023–2024	Atyrau	47	(0)
2025–	Dinamo Brest	35	(1)

International career^{‡}
2017–2018	Belarus U21	4	(0)
2020	Belarus	1	(0)
- * Club domestic league appearances and goals as of 6 July 2026 ‡ National team caps and goals as of 26 February 2020

Nikita Stepanov (Belarusian: Мікіта Сцяпанаў; Russian: Никита Степанов; born 6 April 1996) is a Belarusian professional footballer who plays for Dinamo Brest as a midfielder.

== International career ==
Stepanov earned his first cap for the national team of his country on 26 February 2020, playing the full 90 minutes in the 1:0 away win over Bulgaria in a friendly match.
