= Artsyom Vasilyew =

Belarusian footballer

Personal information
- Date of birth: 23 January 1997 (age 29)
- Place of birth: Minsk, Belarus
- Height: 1.78 m (5 ft 10 in)
- Position: Forward

Youth career
- 2013–2014: Minsk

Senior career*
| Years | Team | Apps | (Gls) |
| 2014–2020 | Minsk | 75 | (11) |
| 2020 | Gorodeya | 0 | (0) |
| 2021 | Energetik-BGU Minsk | 15 | (2) |
| 2021 | Arsenal Dzerzhinsk | 15 | (0) |
| 2022 | Rogachev | 12 | (1) |

International career^{‡}
| 2016–2017 | Belarus U21 | 9 | (0) |
- * Club domestic league appearances and goals as of 31 December 2022 ‡ National team caps and goals as of 14 November 2017

Artsyom Vasilyew (Belarusian: Арцём Васiльеў, Russian: Артём Васильев, romanized: Artyom Vasilyev; born 23 January 1997) is a Belarusian footballer.
