= Roman Burets =

Belarusian professional footballer

Personal information
- Date of birth: 28 January 1997 (age 29)
- Place of birth: Minsk, Belarus
- Height: 1.74 m (5 ft 9 in)
- Position: Forward

Team information
- Current team: Traktor Minsk

Youth career
- 2012–2014: RCOP-BGU Minsk

Senior career*
Years	Team	Apps	(Gls)
2014–2017	Energetik-BGU Minsk	71	(3)
2018	Smolevichi	11	(0)
2018	Granit Mikashevichi	13	(2)
2019	Uzda	13	(0)
2020–2023	Maxline Vitebsk	62	(13)
2023	Traktor Minsk	11	(1)
2024	Bumprom Gomel	0	(0)
2024–	Traktor Minsk		

International career
2012–2013	Belarus U17	3	(0)
- * Club domestic league appearances and goals as of 23 April 2024

Roman Burets (Belarusian: Раман Бурэц; Russian: Роман Бурец; born 28 January 1997) is a Belarusian professional footballer who plays for Traktor Minsk.
