= Dickson Afoakwa =

Ghanaian Professional Footballer

Personal information
- Date of birth: 26 April 1998 (age 28)
- Place of birth: Kumasi, Ghana
- Height: 1.75 m (5 ft 9 in)
- Position: Forward

Senior career*
Years	Team	Apps	(Gls)
–2016	Cornerstones		
2016–2018	Dinamo Brest	18	(2)
2017	→ Gomel (loan)	14	(1)
2018	Triglav Kranj	14	(2)
2019	Stellenbosch	4	(0)
2021–2023	Asante Kotoko		
- * Club domestic league appearances and goals as of 23:04, 28 November 2019 (UTC)

Dickson Afoakwa (born 26 April 1998) is a Ghanaian professional footballer who plays as a forward.

== Career ==
Dickson Afoakwa was born in the second biggest Ghanaian city Kumasi and played for local club Cornerstones FC from Division One League until 2016. During summer transfer window in 2016, scouts of Dinamo Brest noticed the player and he moved to the team very soon. At the beginning, Dickson played for the reserves team, where he tried to adjust himself to local football, and after the adaptation period was over, he moved to the first squad. He left Dinamo Brest after the 2018 season.
