= Igor Bobko =

Belarusian professional footballer

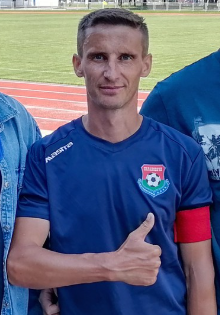

Personal information
- Date of birth: 9 September 1985 (age 41)
- Place of birth: Baranovichi, Byelorussian SSR, Soviet Union
- Height: 1.76 m (5 ft 9 1/2 in)
- Position: Defender

Senior career*
Years	Team	Apps	(Gls)
2006	Kobrin	12	(2)
2007	SKVICH Minsk	10	(0)
2007–2008	PMC Postavy	43	(2)
2009	Gorodeya	12	(0)
2010–2021	Slutsk	255	(17)
2022	Baranovichi	17	(3)
2023	Kronon Stolbtsy	18	(5)
- * Club domestic league appearances and goals as of 31 December 2023

Igor Bobko (Belarusian: Iгар Бабко; Russian: Игорь Бобко; born 9 September 1985) is a Belarusian professional footballer.
