= Yury Kazlow =

Belarusian footballer

Personal information
- Date of birth: 21 May 1991 (age 35)
- Place of birth: Vitebsk, Byelorussian SSR, Soviet Union
- Height: 1.89 m (6 ft 2 in)
- Position: Midfielder

Team information
- Current team: Belshina Bobruisk
- Number: 10

Youth career
- 2006–2008: Minsk

Senior career*
Years	Team	Apps	(Gls)
2008–2011	Minsk	0	(0)
2008	→ Minsk-2	9	(0)
2011	→ Kommunalnik Slonim (loan)	15	(1)
2014–2018	Luch Minsk	121	(38)
2019	Dnyapro Mogilev	19	(2)
2020	Slutsk	23	(3)
2021	Neman Grodno	14	(0)
2021	Minsk	13	(0)
2022	Naftan Novopolotsk	23	(13)
2023–2024	Molodechno	61	(10)
2025–	Belshina Bobruisk	31	(4)
- * Club domestic league appearances and goals as of 3 July 2026

Yury Kazlow (Belarusian: Юрый Казлоў; Russian: Юрий Козлов; born 21 May 1991) is a Belarusian professional footballer who plays for Belshina Bobruisk.
