= Denis Yakubovich =

Belarusian footballer

Personal information
- Date of birth: 31 March 1988 (age 38)
- Place of birth: Soligorsk, Minsk Oblast, Belarusian SSR
- Height: 1.74 m (5 ft 8 1/2 in)
- Position: Defensive midfielder

Youth career
- 2005–2007: Dinamo Minsk

Senior career*
Years	Team	Apps	(Gls)
2005	Molodechno	16	(0)
2005–2007	Dinamo Minsk	0	(0)
2008–2010	Shakhtyor Soligorsk	2	(0)
2009	→ Volna Pinsk (loan)	24	(4)
2010–2011	Granit Mikashevichi	37	(3)
2012	Slutsk	22	(2)
2013	Slonim	25	(1)
2014–2015	Granit Mikashevichi	28	(0)
2016–2017	Gorodeya	36	(0)
2018	Torpedo Minsk	16	(0)
2019	Smorgon	6	(0)
2020	Smorgon	19	(0)
- * Club domestic league appearances and goals as of 31 December 2020

Denis Yakubovich (Belarusian: Дзяніс Якубовіч; Russian: Денис Якубович; born 31 March 1988) is a Belarusian former professional football player.
