= Aleksey Legchilin =

Belarusian footballer

Personal information
- Full name: Aleksey Dmitriyevich Legchilin
- Date of birth: 11 April 1992 (age 34)
- Place of birth: Grodno, Belarus
- Height: 1.91 m (6 ft 3 in)
- Position: Midfielder

Team information
- Current team: Lida
- Number: 3

Youth career
- 2007–2009: Neman Grodno

Senior career*
Years	Team	Apps	(Gls)
2009–2015	Neman Grodno	101	(7)
2016	Minsk	26	(5)
2017–2018	Dinamo Brest	29	(3)
2018–2025	Neman Grodno	151	(8)
2026–	Lida	13	(2)

International career^{‡}
2008–2009	Belarus U17	8	(1)
2010–2011	Belarus U19	5	(0)
2013	Belarus U21	7	(1)
2017	Belarus	1	(0)
- * Club domestic league appearances and goals as of 6 July 2026 ‡ National team caps and goals as of 2 June 2017

Aleksey Dmitriyevich Legchilin (Belarusian: Аляксей Дзмітрыевіч Лягчылін; Russian: Алексей Дмитриевич Легчилин; born 11 April 1992) is a Belarusian professional football player who plays for Belarusian First League club Lida.

== Career ==
Born in Grodno, Legchilin began playing football in FC Neman Grodno's youth system. He joined the senior team and made his Belarusian Premier League debut in 2009.

== Honours ==
Dinamo Brest

- Belarusian Cup winner: 2016–17, 2017–18
- Belarusian Super Cup winner: 2018
