= Oleksiy Tupchiy =

Ukrainian footballer

Personal information
- Full name: Oleksiy Petrovych Tupchiy
- Date of birth: 22 August 1986 (age 40)
- Place of birth: Pervomaisk, Mykolaiv Oblast, Ukrainian SSR
- Height: 1.85 m (6 ft 1 in)
- Position: Midfielder

Youth career
- 1999–2003: RVUFK Kyiv
- 2003: Zmina-Obolon Kyiv

Senior career*
Years	Team	Apps	(Gls)
2004–2010	Dnepr Mogilev	92	(1)
2011	Vitebsk	32	(1)
2012	Belshina Bobruisk	8	(0)
2012	Gomel	7	(0)
2013	Dnepr Mogilev	25	(2)
2014	Shakhtyor Soligorsk	5	(0)
2015	Dnepr Mogilev	29	(8)
2016–2017	Gorodeya	37	(2)
2017	Dnepr Mogilev	15	(1)
2018	Belshina Bobruisk	28	(1)
2019	Gorki	25	(0)
2020	Orsha	19	(0)
- * Club domestic league appearances and goals as of 31 December 2020

Oleksiy Tupchiy (Ukrainian: Олексій Петрович Тупчій; born 22 August 1986) is a Ukrainian former professional footballer who spent his entire senior career in Belarus.
