= Maksim Chizh =

Belarusian professional footballer

Personal information
- Date of birth: 8 October 1993 (age 33)
- Place of birth: Biaroza, Brest Oblast, Belarus
- Height: 1.81 m (5 ft 11 1/2 in)
- Position: Midfielder

Team information
- Current team: Niva Dolbizno
- Number: 9

Youth career
- Dinamo Minsk

Senior career*
Years	Team	Apps	(Gls)
2010–2015	Dinamo Minsk	0	(0)
2010–2015	→ Bereza-2010 (loan)	63	(6)
2016–2017	Dinamo Brest	32	(5)
2017	→ Atlantas (loan)	6	(0)
2018	Dnepr Mogilev	14	(1)
2018	→ Rukh Brest (loan)	14	(4)
2019–2020	Rukh Brest	33	(5)
2021	Malorita	18	(6)
2022	Volna Pinsk	23	(7)
2023–	Niva Dolbizno	16	(1)
- * Club domestic league appearances and goals as of 22 September 2023

Maksim Chizh (Belarusian: Максім Чыж; Russian: Максим Чиж; born 8 October 1993) is a Belarusian professional footballer who plays for Niva Dolbizno.

== Honours ==
Dinamo Brest

- Belarusian Cup winner: 2016–17
