= Vyachaslaw Yaraslawski =

Belarusian footballer

Personal information
- Date of birth: 14 May 1985 (age 41)
- Place of birth: Minsk, Belarusian SSR
- Height: 1.75 m (5 ft 9 in)
- Position: Left back

Youth career
- 2001: Torpedo-MAZ Minsk
- 2002–2003: Lokomotiv Minsk

Senior career*
Years	Team	Apps	(Gls)
2002–2003	Lokomotiv Minsk	4	(0)
2002	→ SKVICH Minsk	20	(3)
2003–2005	Sheriff Tiraspol	27	(1)
2006	Dinamo Brest	18	(0)
2007	Neman Grodno	10	(0)
2008–2009	Minsk	29	(1)
2009	Belshina Bobruisk	9	(0)
2010	SKVICH Minsk	28	(1)
2011	Vitebsk	30	(0)
2012–2013	Torpedo-BelAZ Zhodino	28	(1)
2013	Slavia Mozyr	13	(0)
2014	Vitebsk	22	(0)
2015–2017	Gorodeya	65	(1)
2018	Lida	5	(0)

International career
2004–2006	Belarus U21	6	(0)

Managerial career
- 2020: Smolevichi (assistant)
- * Club domestic league appearances and goals

Vyachaslaw Yaraslawski (Belarusian: Вячаслаў Яраслаўскі; Russian: Вячеслав Ярославский; born 14 May 1985) is a Belarusian former professional footballer.

== Honours ==
Sheriff Tiraspol

- Moldovan National Division champion: 2003–04, 2004–05, 2005–06
- Moldovan Cup winner: 2005–06
- Moldovan Super Cup winner: 2003

Dinamo Brest

- Belarusian Cup winner: 2006–07
