= Aleksandr Mrinsky =

Belarusian footballer

Personal information
- Date of birth: 9 August 1990 (age 36)
- Place of birth: Khvoyniki, Chervyen Raion, Minsk Oblast
- Height: 1.76 m (5 ft 9 in)
- Position: Forward

Team information
- Current team: Kolos Cherven

Youth career
- 2005–2006: Dinamo Minsk

Senior career*
Years	Team	Apps	(Gls)
2007–2010	Dinamo Minsk	4	(0)
2010	→ Bereza-2010 (loan)	4	(0)
2011–2012	Belshina Bobruisk	10	(1)
2013	Vitebsk	10	(1)
2014	Lokomotíva Košice	8	(0)
2015	Uzda	20	(21)
2016–2017	Volna Pinsk	37	(20)
2018–2019	Uzda	32	(26)
2019	Osipovichi	3	(0)
2021–	Kolos Cherven	16	(22)
- * Club domestic league appearances and goals as of 31 December 2022

Aleksandr Mrinsky (Belarusian: Аляксандар Мрынскi; Russian: Александр Мринский; born 9 August 1990) is a Belarusian footballer who plays for Kolos Cherven.
