= Dmitry Gomza =

Belarusian footballer

Dzmitry Gomza
Personal information
- Date of birth: 3 May 1987 (age 39)
- Place of birth: Baranovichi, Brest Oblast, Byelorussian SSR, Soviet Union
- Height: 1.76 m (5 ft 9 in)
- Position: Forward

Senior career*
Years	Team	Apps	(Gls)
2007	PMK-7 Gantsevichi		
2008	Gorodeya	7	(0)
2009	Bereza	4	(1)
2009–2010	Baranovichi	41	(5)
2011	Beltransgaz Slonim	27	(26)
2012	Gomel	0	(0)
2012	→ Vitebsk (loan)	26	(6)
2013	Torpedo-BelAZ Zhodino	2	(0)
2013	Gorodeya	15	(4)
2014	Vitebsk	15	(4)
2014–2015	Gomelzheldortrans	40	(14)
2016–2017	Gomel	33	(9)
2017–2018	Belshina Bobruisk	43	(25)
2019	Smolevichi	26	(11)
2020–2021	Gomel	52	(22)
2022	Belshina Bobruisk	26	(6)
2023	Bumprom Gomel	6	(1)
- * Club domestic league appearances and goals as of 31 May 2023

Dzmitry Gomza (Belarusian: Дзмітрый Гомза; Russian: Дмитрий Гомза; born 3 May 1987) is a Belarusian former professional footballer.

On 11 May 2023 Gomza was declared persona non grata by BFF for his involvement in the match fixing during his time in Belshina Bobruisk in 2022.

== Honours ==
Gomel

- Belarusian Cup winner: 2021–22
- Belarusian Super Cup winner: 2012
