= Kirill Shokurov =

Belarusian footballer

Personal information
- Date of birth: 7 April 1994 (age 32)
- Place of birth: Bobruisk, Mogilev Oblast, Belarus
- Height: 1.84 m (6 ft 1/2 in)
- Position: Forward

Team information
- Current team: Wilga Garwolin
- Number: 5

Youth career
- 2009–2014: Belshina Bobruisk

Senior career*
Years	Team	Apps	(Gls)
2015–2017	Belshina Bobruisk	45	(6)
2018	Volna Pinsk	28	(5)
2019	Belshina Bobruisk	1	(0)
2019	Khimik Svetlogorsk	15	(4)
2020	Volna Pinsk	11	(0)
2021	Orsha	8	(0)
2021	Lida	19	(4)
2022	Veles-2020 Vitebsk	20	(19)
2023–	Wilga Garwolin	79	(5)
- * Club domestic league appearances and goals as of 08:17, 23 June 2025 (UTC)

Kirill Shokurov (Belarusian: Кiрыл Шакураў; Russian: Кирилл Шокуров; born 7 April 1994) is a Belarusian professional footballer who plays as a forward for Polish club Wilga Garwolin.
