= Artyom Fedyanin =

Belarusian professional footballer

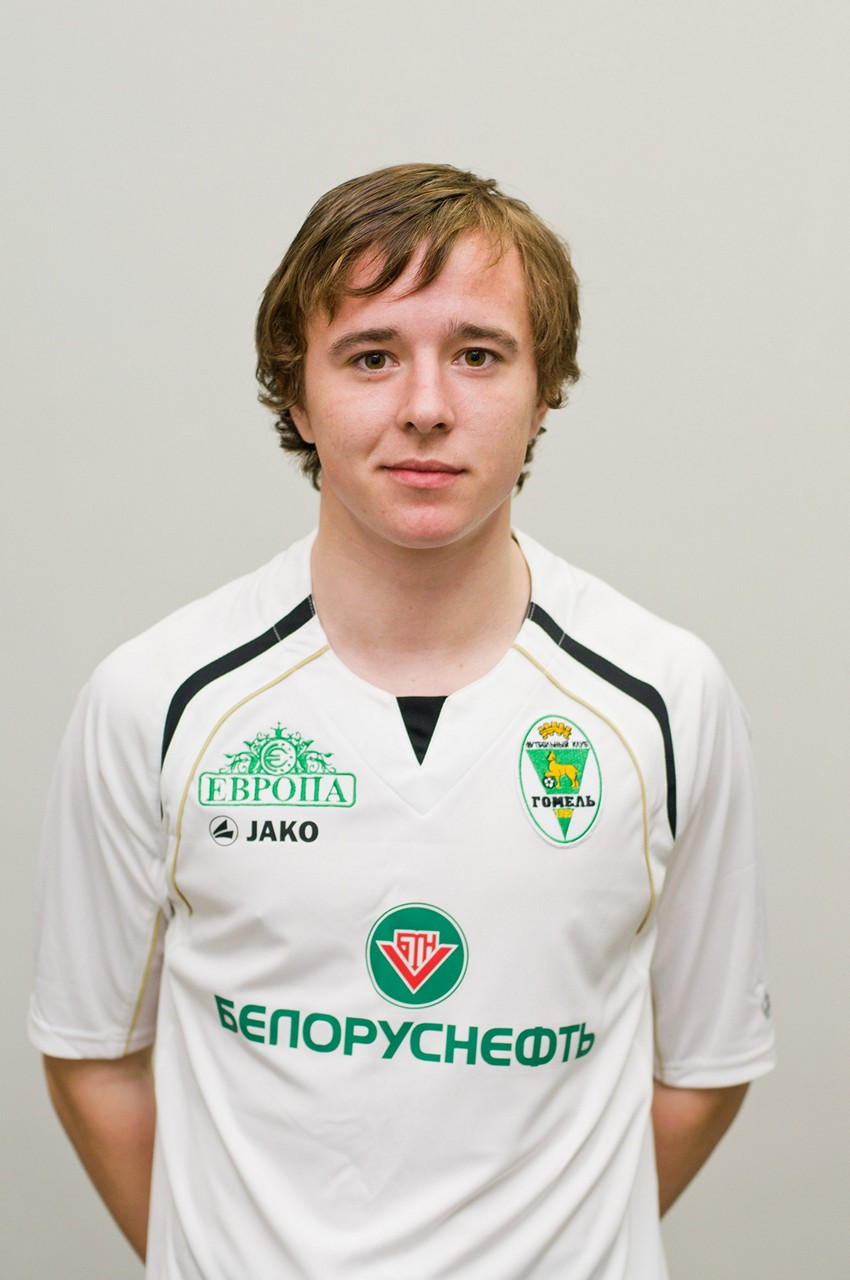
- Artyom Fedyanin in 2013

Personal information
- Full name: Artyom Aleksandrovich Fedyanin
- Date of birth: 25 April 1994 (age 32)
- Place of birth: Gomel, Belarus
- Height: 1.75 m (5 ft 9 in)
- Position: Midfielder

Team information
- Current team: Bumprom Gomel
- Number: 8

Youth career
- 2011–2012: Gomel

Senior career*
Years	Team	Apps	(Gls)
2012–2015	Gomel	6	(0)
2014	→ Rechitsa-2014 (loan)	24	(1)
2016	Khimik Svetlogorsk	21	(3)
2017	Osipovichi	26	(11)
2018–2019	Smolevichi	48	(7)
2020–2021	Sputnik Rechitsa	33	(7)
2021–2022	Dnepr Mogilev	41	(4)
2023–	Bumprom Gomel	28	(1)

International career^{‡}
2013	Belarus U21	6	(0)
- * Club domestic league appearances and goals as of 31 December 2023 ‡ National team caps and goals as of 5 November 2014

Artyom Aleksandrovich Fedyanin (Belarusian: Арцём Аляксандравіч Фядзянін; Russian: Артём Александрович Федянин; born 25 April 1994) is a Belarusian professional footballer who plays for Bumprom Gomel.
