= Semen Smunev =

Belarusian footballer

Personal information
- Date of birth: 14 September 1995 (age 31)
- Place of birth: Murmansk, Russia
- Height: 1.87 m (6 ft 1 1/2 in)
- Position: Defender

Team information
- Current team: Veles-2020 Vitebsk

Youth career
- 2011–2012: Vitebsk
- 2013–2015: Naftan Novopolotsk

Senior career*
Years	Team	Apps	(Gls)
2012	Vitebsk-2	34	(1)
2016–2017	Naftan Novopolotsk	0	(0)
2016	→ Smorgon (loan)	10	(1)
2016	→ Neman Grodno (loan)	1	(0)
2017	→ Smorgon (loan)	22	(2)
2018	Orsha	14	(0)
2018–2019	Smorgon	23	(1)
2019	Sputnik Rechitsa	8	(0)
2020–2021	Orsha	29	(3)
2022–	Veles-2020 Vitebsk	10	(5)
- * Club domestic league appearances and goals as of 31 December 2022

Semen Smunev (Belarusian: Сямён Смунёў; Russian: Семён Смунёв; born 14 September 1995) is a Belarusian footballer who plays for Veles-2020 Vitebsk.
