= Yevgeniy Prokopchik =

Belarusian footballer

Personal information
- Date of birth: 13 March 1993 (age 33)
- Place of birth: Braslaw, Vitebsk Oblast, Belarus
- Height: 1.90 m (6 ft 3 in)
- Position: Defender

Youth career
- 2010–2013: Torpedo-BelAZ Zhodino

Senior career*
Years	Team	Apps	(Gls)
2014–2015	Torpedo-BelAZ Zhodino	0	(0)
2014	→ Zvezda-BGU Minsk (loan)	28	(2)
2015	→ Bereza-2010 (loan)	1	(0)
2016–2017	Orsha	50	(4)
2018	Lokomotiv Gomel	12	(0)
2019–2020	Oshmyany	44	(7)
2021	Energetik-BGU Minsk	1	(0)
2023	Yuni Minsk	15	(4)
- * Club domestic league appearances and goals as of 31 December 2023

Yevgeniy Prokopchik (Belarusian: Яўген Пракопчык; Russian: Евгений Прокопчик; born 13 March 1993) is a Belarusian professional footballer.
