= Anton Lukashin =

Belarusian footballer

Personal information
- Date of birth: 21 February 1995 (age 31)
- Place of birth: Grodno, Belarus
- Height: 1.81 m (5 ft 11 1/2 in)
- Position: Forward

Youth career
- 2012–2014: Neman Grodno

Senior career*
Years	Team	Apps	(Gls)
2014–2019	Neman Grodno	3	(0)
2016–2017	→ Lida (loan)	56	(5)
2018	→ Granit Mikashevichi (loan)	28	(8)
2019	Lida	9	(0)
2020	Sputnik Rechitsa	19	(2)
- * Club domestic league appearances and goals as of 31 December 2020

Anton Lukashin (Belarusian: Антон Лукашын; Russian: Антон Лукашин; born 21 February 1995) is a Belarusian former professional football player.
