= Dzmitry Lebedzew =

Belarusian footballer

Personal information
- Date of birth: 13 May 1986 (age 40)
- Place of birth: Soligorsk, Minsk Oblast, Belarusian SSR
- Height: 1.78 m (5 ft 10 in)
- Position: Forward

Youth career
- 2003–2005: Shakhtyor Soligorsk
- 2006: MTZ-RIPO Minsk

Senior career*
Years	Team	Apps	(Gls)
2007–2009	Smorgon	61	(8)
2010	Vitebsk	8	(1)
2010–2012	Neman Grodno	34	(3)
2012–2020	Gorodeya	202	(73)
2020	Krumkachy Minsk	11	(7)
2020	Belshina Bobruisk	7	(0)
2021	Krumkachy Minsk	13	(1)
2021	Belshina Bobruisk	11	(0)
2022–2023	Ostrovets	44	(10)
- * Club domestic league appearances and goals as of 31 December 2023

Dzmitry Lebedzew (Belarusian: Дзмітрый Лебедзеў; Russian: Дмитрий Лебедев; born 13 May 1986) is a Belarusian former professional footballer who played as a forward.

His brother Alyaksandr Lebedzew is also a professional footballer.

== Career ==
Born in Soligorsk, Lebedzew began playing football in FC Shakhtyor Soligorsk's youth system. He didn't make any senior appearances for the club, and moved to FC Smorgon where he made his Belarusian Premier League debut in 2007.
