= Kiryl Vyarheychyk =

Belarusian footballer (born 1991)

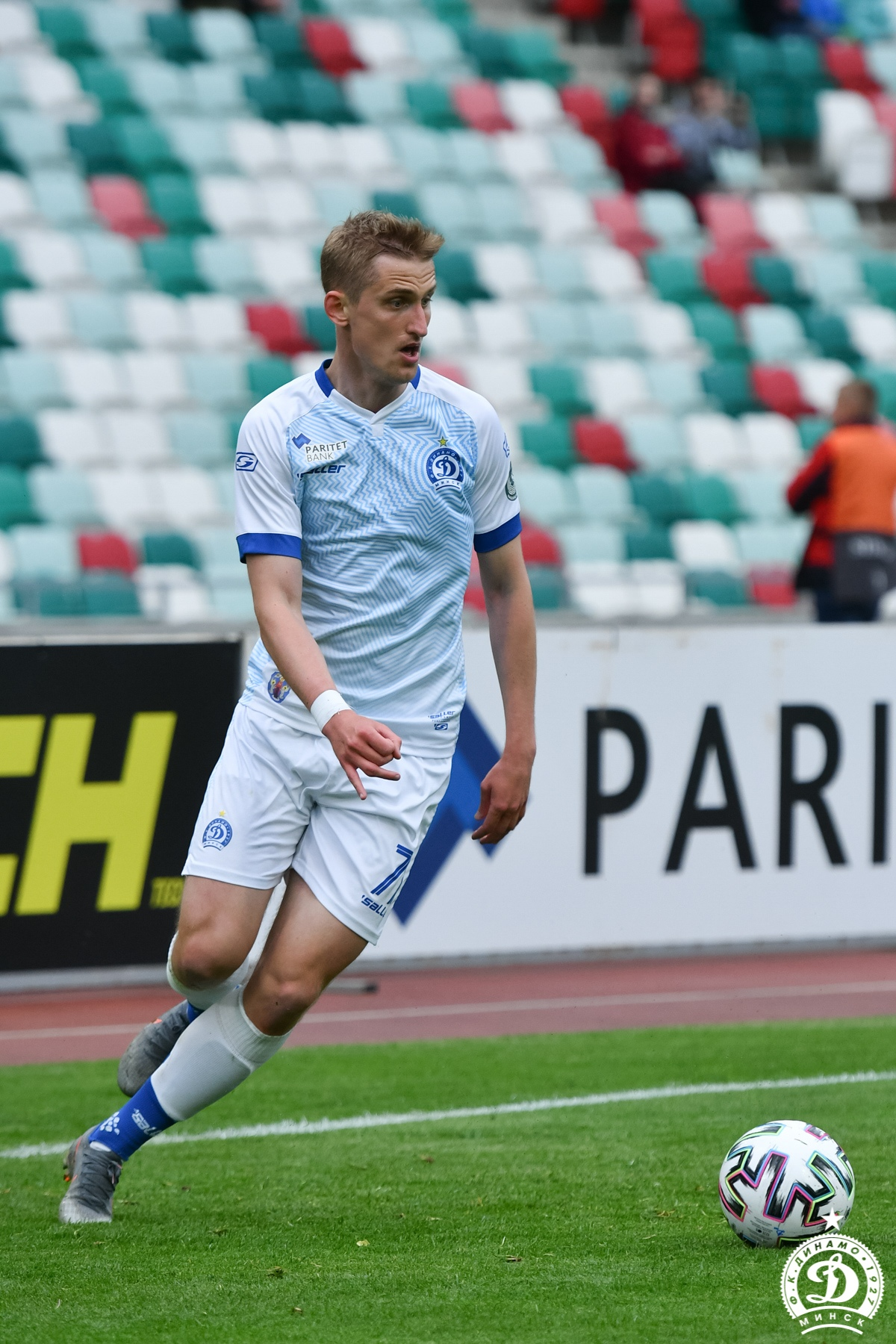

Personal information
- Date of birth: 23 August 1991 (age 35)
- Place of birth: Minsk, Belarus
- Height: 1.70 m (5 ft 7 in)
- Position: Forward

Youth career
- 2007–2010: Shakhtyor Soligorsk

Senior career*
Years	Team	Apps	(Gls)
2008–2015	Shakhtyor Soligorsk	54	(3)
2012	→ Torpedo-BelAZ Zhodino (loan)	11	(2)
2014	→ Dinamo Brest (loan)	27	(4)
2016	Neman Grodno	11	(0)
2016–2018	Vitebsk	70	(20)
2019–2020	Dinamo Minsk	23	(2)
2020	→ Vitebsk (loan)	5	(0)
2021–2023	Slutsk	71	(10)

International career
2010–2012	Belarus U21	5	(0)
- * Club domestic league appearances and goals as of 31 December 2023

Kiryl Vyarheychyk (Belarusian: Кірыл Вяргейчык; Russian: Кирилл Вергейчик; born 23 August 1991) is a Belarusian former professional footballer.

== Honours ==
Shakhtyor Soligorsk

- Belarusian Cup winner: 2013–14

== Personal life ==
He is a son of the coach and former Belarus international player Yury Vyarheychyk.
