= Gorodeya Stadium =

Sports venue in Gorodeya, Belarus

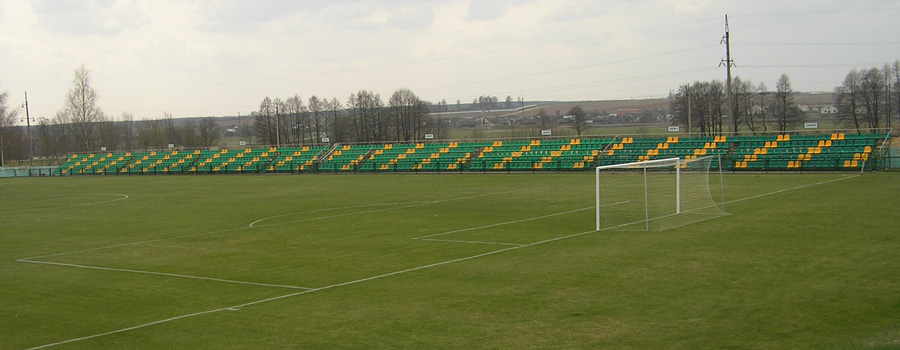
- Interactive map of Gorodeya Stadium
- Location: Gorodeya, Minsk Oblast, Belarus
- Coordinates: 53°18′24″N 26°30′27″E
- Owner: FC Gorodeya
- Capacity: 1,625
- Surface: Grass
- Field size: 105 x 68 meters

Construction
- Opened: 2006
- Renovated: 2011, 2016

Tenant
- FC Gorodeya

Gorodeya Stadium is a stadium in Gorodeya, Minsk Oblast, Belarus. It is currently used for football matches and is the home ground of FC Gorodeya. The stadium holds 1,625 spectators.

== History ==
The stadium was built and opened in 2006 and has been used by local club FC Gorodeya ever since. Stadium's original capacity was only 300. After renovations in 2011, additional stands were built to increase capacity to 1,050. Further renovations were done in 2016, preparing the stadium for Belarusian Premier League, after which the capacity increased to current 1,625.
