= Aleksey Khodnevich =

Belarusian footballer

Personal information
- Date of birth: 2 November 1987 (age 39)
- Place of birth: Svislach, Grodno Oblast, Belarusian SSR
- Height: 1.94 m (6 ft 4 1/2 in)
- Position: Forward

Youth career
- 2005: Zvezda-BGU Minsk
- 2006: Darida Minsk Raion
- 2007: MTZ-RIPO Minsk

Senior career*
Years	Team	Apps	(Gls)
2008	Livadiya Dzerzhinsk	24	(19)
2009–2010	Rudensk	12	(0)
2010	SKVICH Minsk	8	(0)
2011	Rudensk	16	(2)
2011	Gorodeya	7	(1)
2012	Livadiya Dzerzhinsk	19	(14)
2012	Zvezda-BGU Minsk	16	(13)
2013	SKVICH Minsk	12	(0)
2013–2015	Zvezda-BGU Minsk	43	(30)
2014	→ Dnepr Mogilev (loan)	4	(0)
2015	Smolevichi-STI	13	(12)
2016–2017	Orsha	54	(30)
2018	Krumkachy Minsk	24	(11)
2019	Uzda	26	(30)
2020	Shakhtyor Petrikov	23	(32)
2021–2022	Ostrovets	46	(67)
2023–	Kolos Chervyen	8	(8)
- * Club domestic league appearances and goals as of 31 December 2022

Aleksey Khodnevich (Belarusian: Аляксей Хадневiч; Russian: Алексей Ходневич; born 2 November 1987) is a Belarusian footballer.

In 2021 Khodnevich scored a record-setting 59 goals for Ostrovets in Belarusian Second League.
