= Valery Gorbachik =

Belarusian footballer

Personal information
- Full name: Valery Syarheyevich Gorbachik
- Date of birth: 19 January 1995 (age 31)
- Place of birth: Maryina Horka, Minsk Oblast, Belarus
- Height: 1.84 m (6 ft 0 in)
- Position: Forward

Team information
- Current team: Arsenal Dzerzhinsk
- Number: 33

Youth career
- 2011–2014: Dinamo Minsk

Senior career*
Years	Team	Apps	(Gls)
2013–2016	Dinamo Minsk	0	(0)
2015	→ Bereza-2010 (loan)	28	(12)
2016	→ Smolevichi-STI (loan)	25	(8)
2017–2018	Smolevichi	45	(20)
2018–2021	Torpedo-BelAZ Zhodino	58	(14)
2020	→ Liepāja (loan)	9	(3)
2021	Isloch Minsk Raion	12	(1)
2022–2023	Torpedo-BelAZ Zhodino	53	(15)
2024–2025	Chelyabinsk	52	(10)
2025	Vitebsk	11	(0)
2026–	Arsenal Dzerzhinsk	8	(3)

International career
2011	Belarus U17	2	(0)
2013	Belarus U19	1	(0)
2014	Belarus U21	3	(0)
- * Club domestic league appearances and goals as of 3 July 2026

Valery Sergeyevich Gorbachik (Belarusian: Валерый Сяргеевіч Гарбачык; Russian: Валерий Сергеевич Горбачик; born 19 January 1995) is a Belarusian professional footballer who plays for Arsenal Dzerzhinsk.

== Honours ==
Liepāja

- Latvian Football Cup winner: 2020
