= Leandro Torres =

Argentine footballer

Personal information
- Full name: Leandro Gabriel Torres
- Date of birth: November 4, 1988 (age 38)
- Place of birth: Rosario, Argentina
- Height: 1.66 m (5 ft 5 1/2 in)
- Position: Midfielder

Youth career
- Newell's Old Boys

Senior career*
Years	Team	Apps	(Gls)
2006–2009	Newell's Old Boys	42	(1)
2009–2010	Godoy Cruz	20	(1)
2010–2011	→ Emelec (loan)	18	(1)
2011–2012	Newell's Old Boys	13	(0)
2013	Santiago Wanderers	12	(2)
2014	Buriram United	3	(0)
2014–2015	Coquimbo Unido	20	(3)
2016	Belshina Bobruisk	13	(0)
2016–2017	Dinamo Brest	42	(13)
2018–2020	Atlético San Luis	22	(1)
2019–2020	→ Tampico Madero (loan)	18	(2)
2021	Oaxaca	6	(0)

International career
2006	Argentina U20	3	(0)
- * Club domestic league appearances and goals as of 31 December 2021

Leandro Gabriel Torres (born 4 November 1988) is an Argentine former football player. He played as an attacking midfielder.

== Career ==
Torres began his playing career in 2006 with Newell's Old Boys. He made his league debut on November 5, 2006, in a 0–1 home defeat to Independiente. After making 38 league appearances for Newell's, Torres joined Godoy Cruz in 2009. In July 2010, he was loaned with an option to buy to the Ecuadorian side Emelec.

== Honours ==
Buriram United

- Kor Royal Cup: 2014
