= City Stadium (Slutsk) =

Sports stadium in Belarus

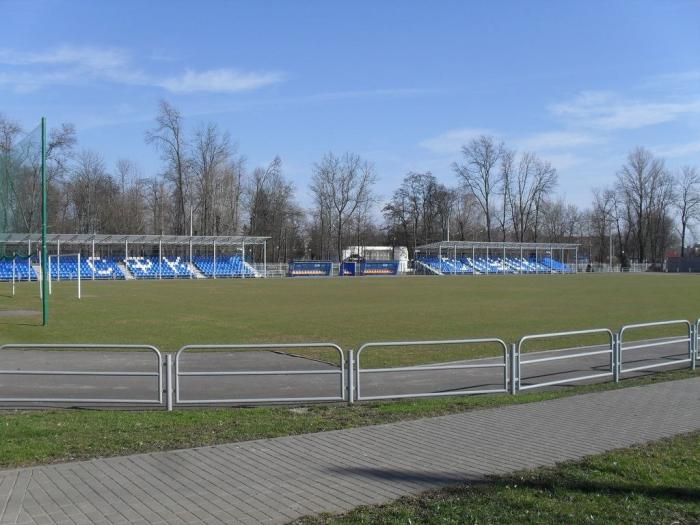
- Interactive map of City Stadium
- Location: Slutsk, Belarus
- Coordinates: 53°1′17″N 27°32′46″E
- Capacity: 1,896
- Surface: Grass

Construction
- Opened: 1935
- Renovated: 1948, 2005, 2011–2014

Tenant
- FC Slutsk

City Stadium is a multi-use stadium in Slutsk, Belarus. It is currently used mostly for football matches and is the home ground of FC Slutsk. The stadium holds 1,896 people.

== History ==
The stadium was originally built in 1935. It was destroyed during World War II and rebuilt in 1948. Further renovations were performed in 2005 (wooden benches replaced by a new seated stand with a capacity of 700) and 2011–2014, when new southern stand was constructed (increasing capacity to the current number of 1,896) and new administrative building opened.
