= FC Kletsk =

- Full name: Football Club Kletsk
- Founded: 2014
- Ground: City Stadium, Kletsk
- Capacity: 1,000
- Head Coach: Dmitry Buyvilo
- League: Belarusian Second League
- 2018: 12th
Home colours	Away colours

FC Kletsk is a Belarusian football club based in Kletsk, Minsk Oblast. The team plays in the Belarusian Second League.

== History ==
FC Kletsk was founded in 2014, following the dissolution of their local predecessors Klechesk Kletsk in 2012. The club was eligible for promotion to the Belarusian First League for the 2017 season, but remained in the Second League after not meeting the licensing criteria.

== Current squad ==
As of October 2023

Note: Flags indicate national team as defined under FIFA eligibility rules; some limited exceptions apply. Players may hold more than one non-FIFA nationality.

No.	Pos.	Nation	Player
—	GK	BLR	Vladislav Lemesh
—	GK	BLR	Nikita Romanenko
—	GK	BLR	Dmitriy Savostey
—	DF	BLR	Maksim Ageychik
—	DF	BLR	Mikhail Garus
—	DF	BLR	Ilya Gatilo
—	DF	BLR	Aleksandr Demchenko
—	DF	BLR	Valeriy Zhuk
—	DF	BLR	Dmitriy Zhukovskiy
—	DF	BLR	Kirill Zasimovich
—	DF	BLR	Anton Kalko
—	DF	BLR	Dmitriy Krivko
—	DF	BLR	Artem Kulik
—	DF	BLR	Dmitriy Leksakov
—	DF	BLR	Yevgeniy Metko
—	DF	BLR	Andrey Rebkovets

No.	Pos.	Nation	Player
—	DF	BLR	Aleksandr Semenchuk
—	MF	BLR	Vadim Aksennik
—	MF	BLR	Stas Gavruk
—	MF	BLR	Gasan Garunov
—	MF	BLR	Andrey Krupskiy
—	MF	BLR	Artem Kurpeshko
—	MF	BLR	Maksim Novik
—	MF	BLR	Oleg Turban
—	MF	BLR	Danila Sokolovskiy
—	FW	BLR	Maksim Baletskiy
—	FW	BLR	Maksim Lyavitski
—	FW	BLR	Maksim Mintyuk
—	FW	BLR	Roman Fedorov
—	FW	BLR	Pavel Shevchuk
—	FW	BLR	Artem Yavorskiy
