= Haradzyeya =

Haradzyeya Гарадзея (Belarusian)
- Urban-type settlement
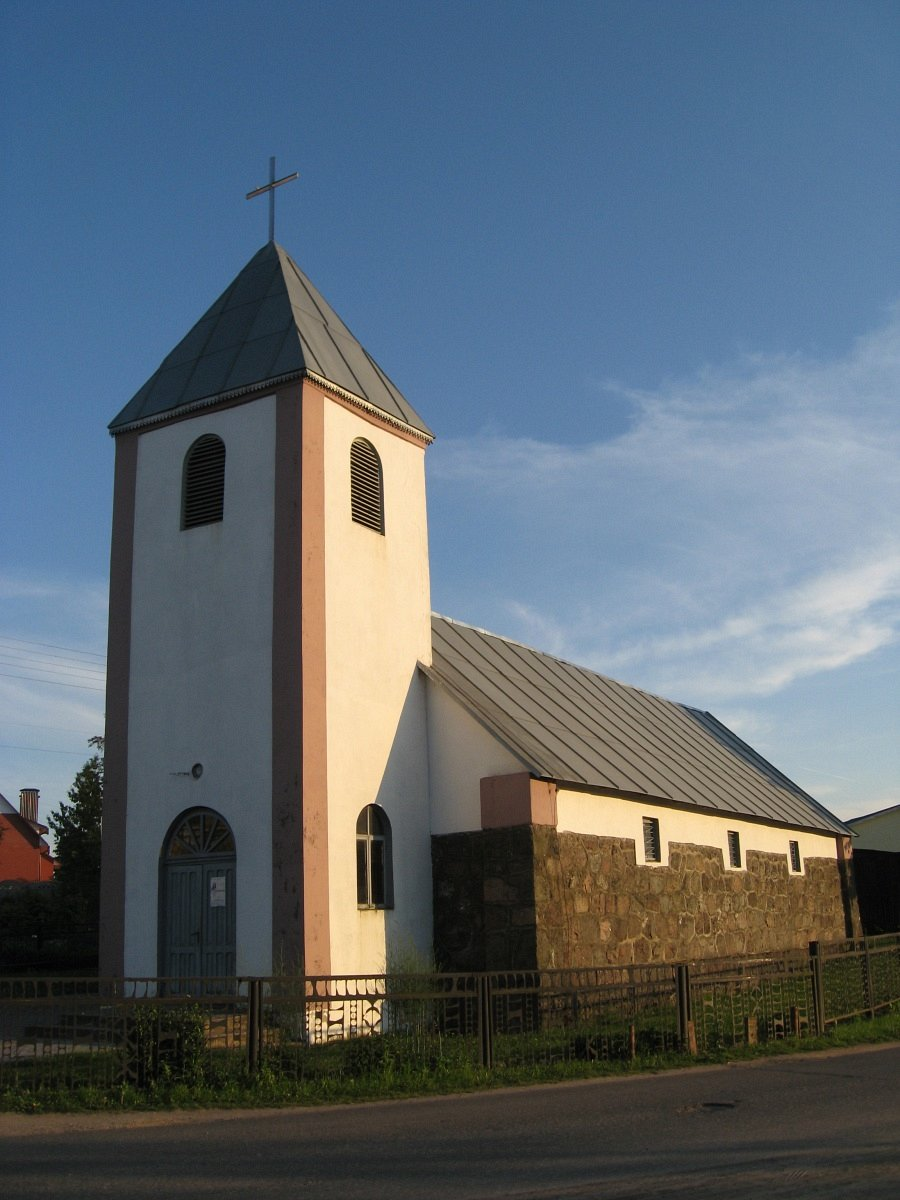
- Roman Catholic St. Joseph church

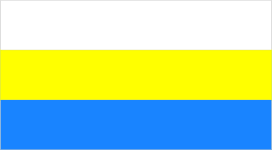
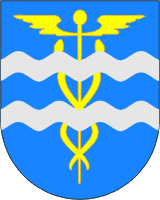
- Flag Seal

- Location within Belarus
- Coordinates: 53°18′47″N 26°32′5″E
- Country: Belarus
- Region: Minsk Region
- District: Nyasvizh District
- First mentioned: 1530

Population (2026)
  - Total: 3,576
- Time zone: UTC+3 (MSK)
- Postal code: 222610

Haradzyeya or Gorodeya (Note: Belarusian: Гарадзея, romanized: Haradzieja; Russian: Городея, romanized: Gorodeya; Polish: Horodziej; Lithuanian: Gorodėja.) is an urban-type settlement in Nyasvizh District, Minsk Region, in west-central Belarus. As of 2026, it has a population of 3,576.

== History ==
=== Early history ===
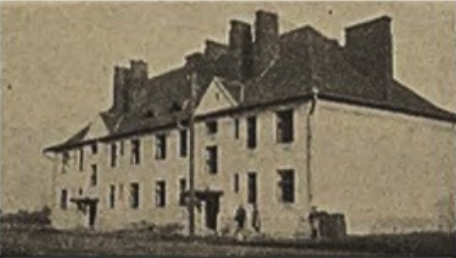
A pre-war Polish house in Horodziej

The first known documental record of the village dates back to 1530. Horodziej was a privately owned village located in the Nowogródek County of the Nowogródek Voivodeship of the Polish–Lithuanian Commonwealth until the Second Partition of Poland (1793) when it was annexed by Tsarist Russia. Initially, the village often changed owners, before it became the property of the powerful Radziwiłł family in 1575. A Roman Catholic church was built in the 17th century.

The village was briefly occupied by the Germans in 1918 and after Poland regained independence (1918) it came under Polish administration in 1919 and was finally reintegrated with Polish territory after the Polish-Soviet War (1919–1921). Administratively Horodziej was part of the Nieśwież County in the Nowogródek Voivodeship. After the destruction of World War I, a new Catholic church and a new railway station were built. In the 1921 census, 44.9% people declared Jewish nationality, 36.3% declared Polish nationality, 18.4% declared Belarusian nationality.

=== World War II ===
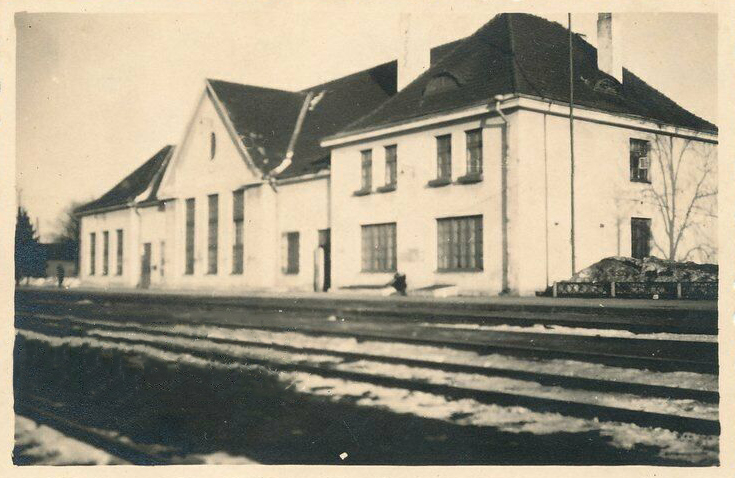
Railway station during World War II

After the German-Soviet invasion of Poland, which started World War II in 1939, the village was under Soviet occupation from 1939 to 1941, German occupation from 1941 to 1944 and again Soviet occupation from 1944 to 1945, when in accordance to the Potsdam Agreement it was taken from Poland and annexed to the Soviet Union.

The local Polish police chief, further two Polish policeman and a school teacher from Horodziej were murdered by the Russians in the Katyn massacre in 1940.

In 1941, an enclosed ghetto of a few houses was established. On July 16, 1942, the ghetto was liquidated. Some Jews were transported in trucks, but most were marched on foot, to a small hill near the Christian cemetery, where a pit had been dug. On the way to the killing site, the guards shot several Jews who were unable to keep up. Approximately 1,000 Jews were shot that day by an Einsatzgruppen. Earlier, in June 1942, local Polish parish priest Józef Gogoliński was arrested and imprisoned in nearby Nieśwież. He was later murdered along with three other priests as part of the continuation of the anti-Polish Intelligenzaktion.

=== Post-war period ===
In 1946 the Roman Catholic St. Joseph church was closed down by the Soviets. It was reopened and renovated in the 1990s after the dissolution of the Soviet Union.

== Sights ==
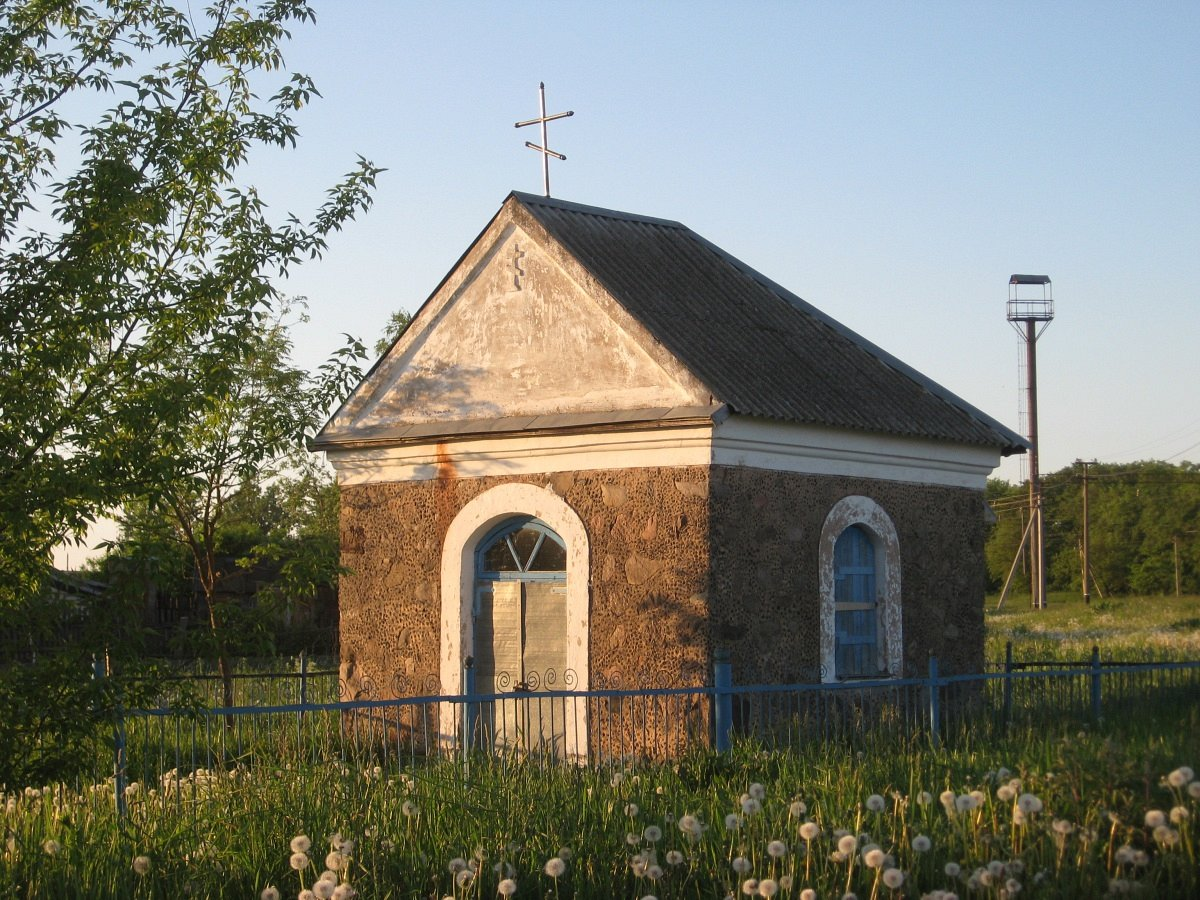
A 19th-century chapel

The historic sights include a chapel built in 1874, a pre-war Polish Roman Catholic Church of St. Joseph, a 19th-century Orthodox Church of the Transfiguration and old houses. There is also a Battle of Grunwald memorial stone and a memorial complex dedicated to the local Jews murdered during the Holocaust.

== Transport ==
A railway station is located in the settlement.

== Sports ==
FC Gorodeya football club is based in the settlement.

== Notable people ==
- Kastus Moskalik (1918–2010), Belarusian Greek Catholic priest
- Alexander Nadson (1926–2015), the Apostolic Visitor for Belarusian Greek-Catholic faithful abroad, scholar, translator and a notable Belarusian émigré social and religious leader.
