= FC Neman-Agro Stolbtsy =

- Full name: Football Club Neman-Agro Stolbtsy
- Founded: 1979
- Dissolved: 2019
- Ground: Yunost Stadium, Stolbtsy, Minsk Oblast, Belarus
- Capacity: 600
- League: Belarusian Second League
- 2018: 11th
Home colours	Away colours

FC Neman Stolbtsy is a Belarusian football club based in Stolbtsy, Minsk Oblast.

== History ==
Neman Stolbtsy was playing in the Belarusian SSR league from 1979 to 1991. In 1992, the team started playing in the Belarusian First League. In 1993, they got relegated to the Second League, and in 1994 to the amateur level. They returned to the Second League in 1997 to spend three more seasons until 1999. During the last year, the team was known as Darida-Belagro Stolbtsy due to sponsorship reasons. At the end of the year, having lost the sponsorship and financial support, the team withdrew.

From 2000 until 2015, Neman Stolbtsy were playing at amateur level in Minsk Oblast league. In 2016, they rejoined the Second League as Neman-Agro Stolbtsy.
