= Svyetlahorsk =

Town in Gomel Region, Belarus

Svyetlahorsk Светлагорск (Belarusian) Светлогорск (Russian)
- Town
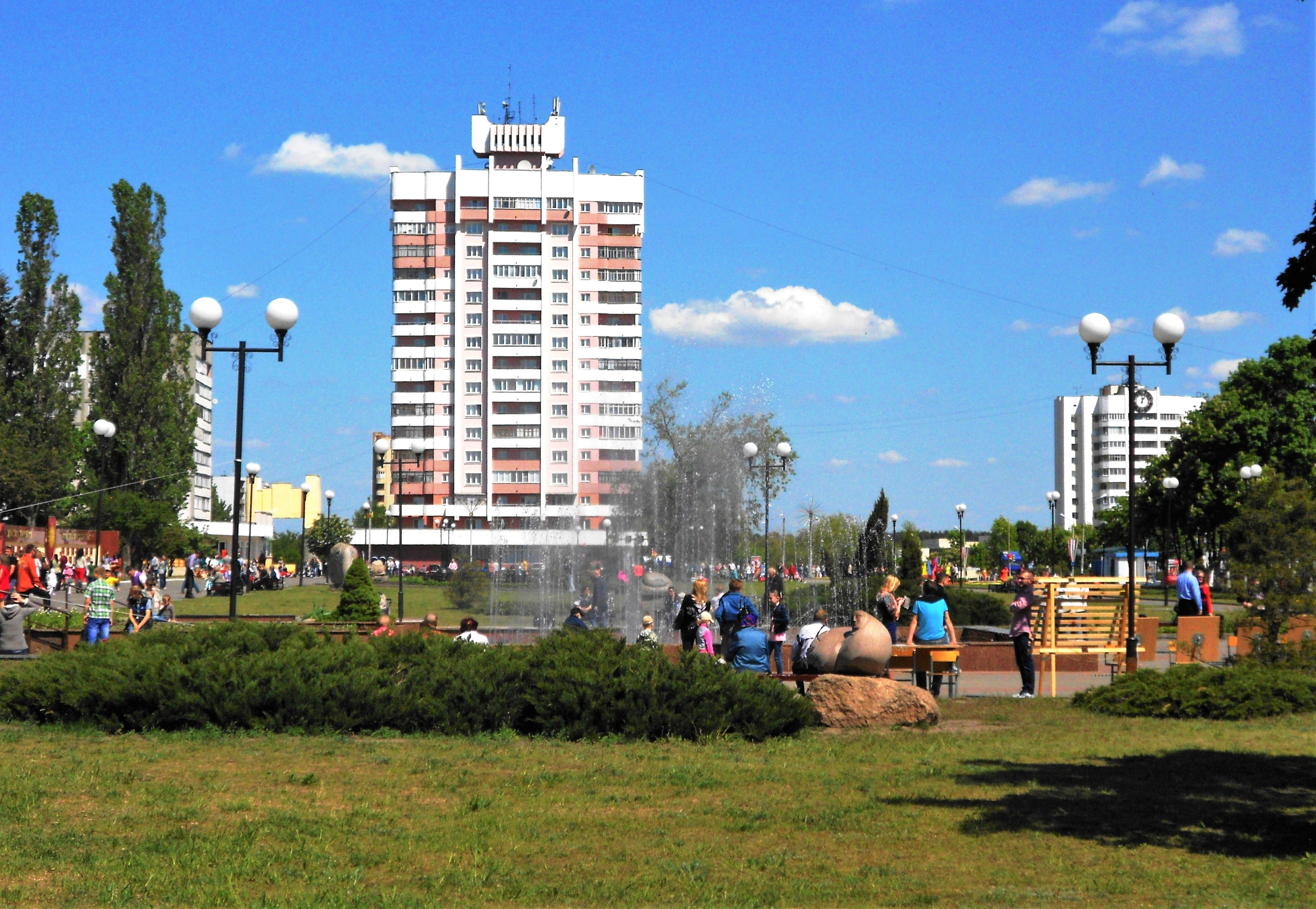
- In the centre of town, with 16-floor one (left) and house with a clock (right) in sight.

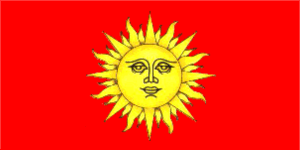
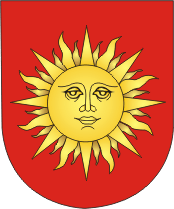
- Flag Coat of arms
- Nickname: Svietly (The Bright), Belarusian: Светлы
- Location within Belarus
- Coordinates: 52°38′N 29°44′E
- Country: Belarus
- Region: Gomel Region
- District: Svyetlahorsk District
- First mentioned: 1560

Area
  - Total: 25.85 km^{2} (9.98 sq mi)
- Elevation: 131 m (430 ft)

Population (2025)
  - Total: 61,812
  - Density: 2,594/km^{2} (6,720/sq mi)
- Time zone: UTC+3 (MSK)
- Postal code: 24743х
- Area code: +375 2342
- License plate: 3
- Website: Official website (in Russian)

Svyetlahorsk (Belarusian: Светлагорск, romanized: Svietlahorsk, (Note: According to the Instruction on Latin Transliteration of Geographical Names of the Republic of Belarus (decree of the State Committee on Land Resources, Surveying and Cartography of the Republic of Belarus dated 11.06.2007 No. 38): Постановление Государственного комитета по имуществу Республики Беларусь от 11.06.2007 № 38 «О внесении изменений и дополнений в Инструкцию по транслитерации географических названий Республики Беларусь буквами латинского алфавита» // Национальный правовой интернет-портал Республики Беларусь. (in Russian).) IPA: [sʲvʲetɫaˈɣorsk]) or Svetlogorsk (Russian: Светлогорск), previously known as Shatsilki (Note: Belarusian: Шацілкі; Russian: Шатилки.) until 1961, is a town in Gomel Region, in south-eastern Belarus. It serves as the administrative center of Svyetlahorsk District. It is situated on the Berezina River. In 2019, its population was 67,054. As of 2025, it has a population of 61,812.

== International relations ==
Svyetlahorsk is twinned with:

- Călărași District, Moldova
- Călărași, Romania
- Chernushinsky District, Russia
- Helmstedt, Germany
- Ivanteyevka, Russia
- Kingisepp, Russia
- Kommunar, Russia
- Mendip, England, United Kingdom
- (Georgia (country)) Mtskheta, Georgia
- Obzor (Nesebar), Bulgaria
- Pushkinsky District, Russia
- Sliven, Bulgaria
- Svetlogorsk, Russia
- Svetly, Russia
