= Smalyavichy =

Town in Minsk Region, Belarus

Smalyavichy Смалявічы (Belarusian) Смолевичи (Russian) Smolevichi
- Town
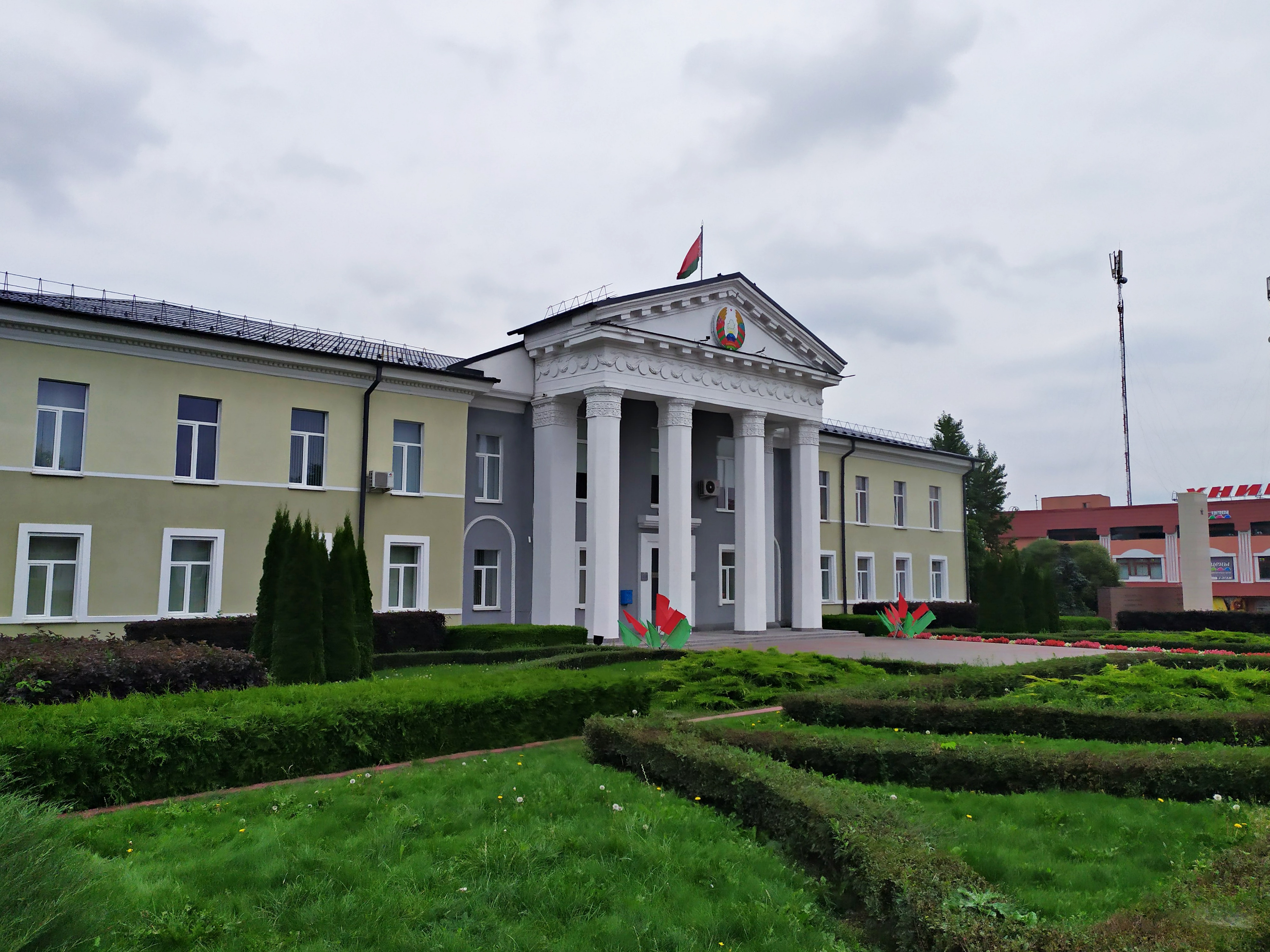
- Town Hall

- Flag Coat of arms

- Location within Belarus
- Coordinates: 54°06′N 28°04′E
- Country: Belarus
- Region: Minsk Region
- District: Smalyavichy District
- First mentioned: 1448
- Town rights since: 1968

Population (2026)
  - Total: 24,402
- Time zone: UTC+3 (MSK)
- Postal code: 222201
- Area code: +375 1776
- License plate: 5
- Website: Smalyavichy Raion official website

Smalyavichy or Smolevichi (Note: Belarusian: Смалявічы, romanized: Smalavičy; Russian: Смолевичи; Yiddish: סמאָלאָוויטש, romanized: Smolovich; Polish: Smolewicze; Lithuanian: Smaliavičai.) is a town in Minsk Region, in central Belarus. It serves as the administrative center of Smalyavichy District. It is situated on the Plisa River (a tributary of the Berezina). As of 2026, it has a population of 24,402.

== History ==
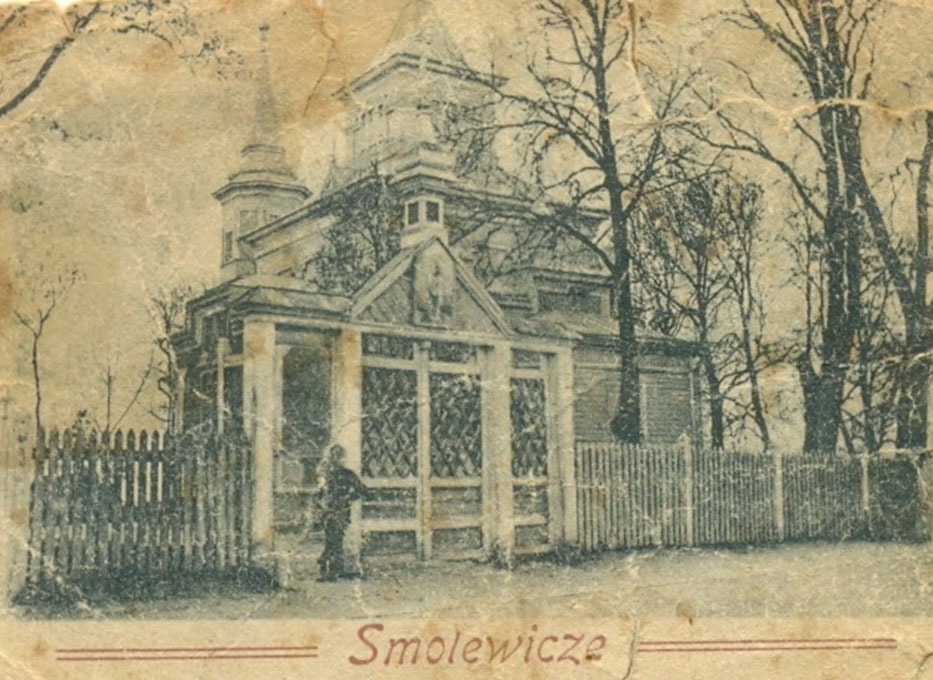
Local church in the 1910s

In the 16th century it was a possession of Grand Hetman of Lithuania Konstanty Ostrogski. Later on, it passed from the Ostrogski to the Radziwiłł family. During the French invasion of Russia, in 1812, military warehouses were located in the town.

During World War II, the town was occupied by Nazi Germany from 1941 to 1944.

== Sport ==
The local football club is the Smolevichi, playing in the Belarusian Premier League. Its home ground is the Ozyorny Stadium.
