= FC Uzda =

Uzda
- Full name: FC Uzda
- Founded: 2014
- Ground: City Stadium, Uzda
- Capacity: 900
- Manager: Yegor Romanenko
- League: Belarusian Second League
- 2018: 5th
Home colours	Away colours

FC Uzda is a Belarusian football club based in Uzda, Minsk Oblast.

== History ==
The team was founded in the 2000s as amateur club FC Uzda. They were playing in Minsk Oblast league until 2013. In 2014, the club took the name Belita-Viteks Uzda (after their main sponsor) and joined the Belarusian Second League. In the middle of the 2015 season, the name was reverted to FC Uzda, and at the end of that season, the team was promoted to the Belarusian First League.

== Current squad ==
As of September 2022

Note: Flags indicate national team as defined under FIFA eligibility rules; some limited exceptions apply. Players may hold more than one non-FIFA nationality.

No.	Pos.	Nation	Player
—	GK	(Belarus) BLR	Aleksandr Drozd
—	GK	(Belarus) BLR	Kirill Krasheninnikov
—	DF	(Belarus) BLR	Dmitriy Abrazhevich
—	DF	(Belarus) BLR	Vadim Belko
—	DF	(Belarus) BLR	Maksim Voroshilov
—	DF	(Belarus) BLR	Artem Zhebit
—	DF	(Belarus) BLR	Maksim Petko
—	DF	(Belarus) BLR	Yevgeniy Protasevich
—	DF	(Belarus) BLR	Aleksandr Tolsty
—	DF	(Belarus) BLR	Oleg Trus
—	DF	(Belarus) BLR	Andrey Tsvirko
—	DF	(Belarus) BLR	Aleksandr Yanchevskiy
—	MF	(Belarus) BLR	Aleksey Bokhan
—	MF	(Belarus) BLR	Artem Burakov
—	MF	(Belarus) BLR	Ilya Galitskiy
—	MF	(Belarus) BLR	Sergey Gerasimovich
—	MF	(Belarus) BLR	Konstantin Izmer

No.	Pos.	Nation	Player
—	MF	(Belarus) BLR	Andrey Kozich
—	MF	(Belarus) BLR	Aleksay Kokhnenko
—	MF	(Belarus) BLR	Andrey Martinchik
—	MF	(Belarus) BLR	Ignat Makhnach
—	MF	(Belarus) BLR	Ivan Nechay
—	MF	(Belarus) BLR	Valeriy Nosko
—	MF	(Belarus) BLR	Danila Stasevich
—	DF	(Belarus) BLR	Matvey Fomichev
—	DF	(Belarus) BLR	Aleksandr Shpak
—	FW	(Belarus) BLR	Aleksandr Gerasimovich
—	FW	(Belarus) BLR	Oleg Kashkan
—	FW	(Belarus) BLR	Viktor Chechkovskiy
—	FW	(Belarus) BLR	Igor Kuchuk
—	FW	(Belarus) BLR	Vladislav Makhankevich
—	FW	(Belarus) BLR	Sergey Nemkovich
—	FW	(Belarus) BLR	Pavel Troyanovskiy
—	FW	(Belarus) BLR	Nikolay Shavel
