= FC Luch Minsk (2012) =

Luch Minsk
- Full name: FC Luch Minsk
- Founded: 2012
- Ground: SOK Olimpiysky, Minsk
- Capacity: 1,530
- Head Coach: Ivan Bionchik
- League: Belarusian Premier League
- 2018: 13th
Home colours	Away colours

FC Luch Minsk (Russian: ФК Луч; Belarusian: ФК Прамень Мінск, translit. FK Pramyen' Minsk, 'lightning') is a Belarusian football club based in Minsk.

== History ==
The team was founded in 2012 under the name ALF-2007 Minsk as a selection of best players from Minsk-based Amateur Football League (independent from BFF), which itself was founded in 2007 (hence the team name). The team spent one successful season in BFF-sanctioned Minsk Championship and was accepted to Belarusian Second League since 2013. In 2014, they took the name Luch Minsk. In 2015, the team was promoted to the Belarusian First League and in 2018 they made their debut in Belarusian Premier League.

In spring 2019, the club merged with Dnepr Mogilev. The united club was named Dnyapro Mogilev. It inherited Luch's Premier League spot and licence, their sponsorships and most of the squad, while keeping only a few of Dnepr players and relocating to Mogilev. Dnepr continued its participation in youth tournaments independently from Luch.
