= FC Gorodeya =

Gorodeya
- Full name: Football Club Gorodeya
- Founded: 2004
- Dissolved: 2021
- Ground: Gorodeya Stadium
- Capacity: 1,020
- League: Belarusian Premier League
- 2020: 13th
- Website: fcgorodeya.by
Home colours	Away colours

FC Gorodeya (Russian: ФК Городея, FK Haradzeya) was a Belarusian football club based in Gorodeya, Nesvizh Raion, Minsk Oblast.

== History ==
The team was founded in 2004 as a futsal club. They played in the Minsk Oblast championship and later in the Belarusian futsal championship and Cup.

In 2007, they debuted in the Minsk Oblast football championship as well as the Belarusian Cup. In 2008, they joined the Belarusian Second League, and after winning the 2010 season, the team made its debut in the First League in 2011.

In 2016, Gorodeya made its debut in the Belarusian Premier League. In spring 2021 the club was disbanded.
