= 2018–19 Belarusian Cup =

Tournament details
- Country: Belarus
- Teams: 50

Final positions
- Champions: Shakhtyor Soligorsk
- Runners-up: Vitebsk

Tournament statistics
- Matches played: 55
- Goals scored: 163 (2.96 per match)
- Top goal scorer(s): Dzmitry Kamarowski (6 goals)

2018–19 Belarusian Cup is the 28th season of the Belarusian annual cup competition. Contrary to the league season, it is conducted in a fall-spring rhythm. It started in May 2018 and concluded with the final match in May 2019. Shakhtyor Soligorsk won the Cup and qualified for the first qualifying round of the 2019–20 UEFA Europa League.

== Participating clubs ==
The following teams participated in the competition:

| 2018 Belarusian Premier League all 16 teams | 2018 Belarusian First League all 15 teams | 2018 Belarusian Second League; 14 teams (of 15) | Winners of regional cups 5 teams |
| BATE Borisov; Dinamo Minsk; Shakhtyor Soligorsk; Dinamo Brest; Torpedo-BelAZ Zhodino; Neman Grodno; Slutsk; Vitebsk; Gorodeya; Gomel; Isloch Minsk Raion; Minsk; Dnepr Mogilev; Luch Minsk; Smolevichi; Torpedo Minsk | Slavia Mozyr; Naftan Novopolotsk; Lokomotiv Gomel; Belshina Bobruisk; Energetik-BGU Minsk; Volna Pinsk; Granit Mikashevichi; Khimik Svetlogorsk; Orsha; Slonim-2017; Baranovichi; Smorgon; Lida; UAS Zhitkovichi; Chist | Krumkachy Minsk; Osipovichi; Neman-Agro Stolbtsy; Oshmyany; Kletsk; Sputnik Rechitsa; Molodechno-DYuSSh-4; Viktoriya Maryina Gorka; SMIautotrans Smolevichi; Uzda; Energetik-BGATU Minsk; Gorki; Ivatsevichi; Bumprom Gomel | Pripyat Olshany (Brest Oblast); Montazhnik Mozyr (Gomel Oblast); Tsementnik Krasnoselsky (Grodno Oblast); DYuSSh-MTZ-Syabar Minsk (Minsk); Polotskgaz (Vitebsk Oblast) |

== First round ==
In this round 2 amateur clubs were drawn against 2 Second League clubs. The draw was performed on 3 May 2018. The matches were played on 12 and 13 May 2018.

Another 3 amateur clubs and 12 Second League clubs were given a bye to the Second Round. Rukh Brest did not participate.

| 12 May 2018 | DYuSSh-MTZ-Syabar Minsk (A) | 1–0 | Ivatsevichi (III) | Minsk |
| 15:00 | Vashkevich 38' | Report | | Stadium: BGATU Stadium; Attendance: 50; Referee: Kirill Lozin (Minsk) |

| 13 May 2018 | Pripyat Olshany (A) | 4–1 | Bumprom Gomel (III) | Olshany |
| 14:00 | Gembitskiy 31'; Kononovich 68'; Simonovich 82'; Kolyada 87' | Report | Akhramovich 69' | Stadium: School Stadium; Attendance: 1,450; Referee: Aleksandr Volkov (Minsk) |

== Second round ==
In this round 2 winners of the First Round were joined by another 30 clubs. The draw was performed on 3 May 2018. The matches were played on 11 and 13 June 2018.

| 11 June 2018 | Montazhnik Mozyr (A) | 0–0 (a.e.t.) (1–4 p) | Naftan Novopolotsk (II) | Kozenki |
| 17:30 | | Report | | Stadium: Polesye Stadium; Attendance: 300; Referee: Viktor Shimusik (Osipovichi) |
| | Penalties |
| | Budovich (penalty missed); Pikuza (penalty scored); Yermakovets (penalty missed) | | (penalty scored) Zhukov; (penalty scored) Khodenkov; (penalty scored) Khaladkow; (penalty scored) Shuhunkow |

| 13 June 2018 | DYuSSh-MTZ-Syabar Minsk (A) | 0–3 | Uzda (III) | Minsk |
| 14:30 | | Report | Lisakovich 10'; Kazeka 80'; Shyshkin 90+1' | Stadium: KFP Minsk; Attendance: 50; Referee: Dmitriy Markov (Mogilev) |

| 13 June 2018 | Energetik-BGATU Minsk (III) | 0–0 (a.e.t.) (6–5 p) | Khimik Svetlogorsk (II) | Minsk |
| 18:00 | | Report | | Stadium: BGATU Stadium; Attendance: 150; Referee: Olga Tereshko (Molodechno) |
| | Penalties |
| | Osmolovskiy (penalty scored); Galay (penalty scored); Kupreichik (penalty scored); Zhabinskiy (penalty scored); Galagush (penalty scored); Maletsin (penalty scored) | | (penalty scored) Komarov; (penalty scored) Khalimonchikov; (penalty scored) Kundro; (penalty scored) Nasanovich; (penalty scored) Petrushevsky; (penalty missed) A.Belyawski |

| 13 June 2018 | Viktoriya Maryina Gorka (III) | 0–6 | Lida (II) | Maryina Gorka |
| 18:00 | | Report | Lisakovich 44', 61'; Bombel 70'; Korsak 73'; Rozhkov 80' (o.g.); Shorats 85' | Stadium: City Stadium; Attendance: 115; Referee: Nikolay Vasko (Minsk) |

| 13 June 2018 | Oshmyany (III) | 0–0 (a.e.t.) (1–3 p) | Energetik-BGU Minsk (II) | Oshmyany |
| 18:00 | | Report | | Stadium: FOK Stadium; Attendance: 500; Referee: Vladislav Golodukhin (Brest) |
| | Penalties |
| | Ladutko (penalty scored); Velisevich (penalty missed); Andreyev (penalty missed); Tyunis (penalty missed) | | (penalty scored) Vasiliev; (penalty scored) Girs; (penalty missed) Krivitsky; (penalty scored) Raschenya |

| 13 June 2018 | Pripyat Olshany (A) | 0–8 | Belshina Bobruisk (II) | Olshany |
| 18:00 | | Report | Gradoboyev 30', 49'; Rutskiy 32'; Khankevich 42'; Gomza 46', 56', 57'; Baiduk 62' | Stadium: School Stadium; Attendance: 2,000; Referee: Andrey Vasilevich (Mozyr) |

| 13 June 2018 | Sputnik Rechitsa (III) | 0–0 (a.e.t.) (3–4 p) | Smorgon (II) | Rechitsa |
| 18:30 | | Report | | Stadium: Central Stadium; Attendance: 600; Referee: Denis Tarasyuk (Brest) |
| | Penalties |
| | Shkabara (penalty scored); Ponyakov (penalty missed); Zabolotsky (penalty scored); Dashuk (penalty scored); Arhiptsaw (penalty missed) | | (penalty scored) Demidchik; (penalty scored) Vakulich; (penalty missed) Bondarenko; (penalty scored) Kapsky; (penalty scored) Tishko |

| 13 June 2018 | Polotskgaz (A) | 2–3 | Orsha (II) | Novopolotsk |
| 18:30 | Vasin 40'; Sharabayko 56' | Report | Znak 65', 68'; Rusak 86' | Stadium: Atlant Stadium; Attendance: 350; Referee: Kirill Pilipovets (Molodechno) |

| 13 June 2018 | Osipovichi (III) | 2–3 | Slavia Mozyr (II) | Osipovichi |
| 18:30 | Pasevich 46'; An.Yemelyanaw 78' | Report | Trapashko 18'; Zavadskiy 82'; Costrov 88' | Stadium: Yunost Stadium; Attendance: 600; Referee: Artur Kunay (Brest) |

| 13 June 2018 | SMIautotrans Smolevichi (III) | 1–1 (a.e.t.) (4–3 p) | Baranovichi (II) | Smolevichi |
| 18:00 | Kulinkovich 120' | Report | Khlebosolov 115' | Stadium: FOK Stadium; Attendance: 350; Referee: Sergey Krasnikov (Grodno) |
| | Penalties |
| | Koshel (penalty scored); Kishkurno (penalty scored); Rusko (penalty scored); Sokolovskiy (penalty missed); Minko (penalty scored) | | (penalty scored) Syrisko; (penalty missed) Yatskevich; (penalty scored) Ganich; (penalty scored) Betenya; (penalty missed) Khlebosolov |

| 13 June 2018 | Krumkachy Minsk (III) | 0–1 | UAS Zhitkovichi (II) | Minsk |
| 18:45 | | Report | Antanyuk 2' | Stadium: RCOP-BGU Stadium; Attendance: 550; Referee: Pavel Koronets (Zhodino) |

| 13 June 2018 | Tsementnik Krasnoselsky (A) | 0–5 | Volna Pinsk (II) | Grodno |
| 19:00 | | Report | Pavlovets 28', 74'; Zheleznikov 40'; Shokurov 65'; Rovbut 78' | Stadium: Neman Stadium; Attendance: 100; Referee: Yevgeniy Yasenovich (Minsk) |

| 13 June 2018 | Kletsk (III) | 1–0 (a.e.t.) | Granit Mikashevichi (II) | Kletsk |
| 19:00 | Leschinskiy 100' | Report | | Stadium: City Stadium; Attendance: 180; Referee: Vitaliy Onikhimovskiy (Minsk) |

| 13 June 2018 | Gorki (III) | 0–2 | Slonim-2017 (II) | Gorki |
| 19:00 | | Report | Glebov 27'; Artyukh 90+1' | Stadium: City Stadium; Attendance: 450; Referee: Sergey Lobatsevich (Vitebsk) |

| 13 June 2018 | Molodechno-DYuSSh-4 (III) | 1–3 | Chist (II) | Molodechno |
| 19:00 | Krot 54' | Report | Kashevsky 29'; Kazyuchits 36'; Lyakhnovich 86' | Stadium: City Stadium; Attendance: 400; Referee: Denis Scherbakov (Minsk) |

| 13 June 2018 | Neman-Agro Stolbtsy (III) | 1–3 | Lokomotiv Gomel (II) | Stolbtsy |
| 19:00 | Dubovik 8' | Report | Krawchanka 23'; Lavrenchuk 77'; Sviridenko 85' | Stadium: Yunost Stadium; Attendance: 250; Referee: Sergey Chistov (Minsk) |

== Round of 32 ==
In this round 16 winners of the Second Round were drawn against 16 Premier League clubs.

| 11 July 2018 | Energetik-BGU Minsk (II) | 1–2 (a.e.t.) | BATE Borisov | Minsk |
| 16:00 | Yudchits 63' | Report | Tuominen 2'; Sen 101' | Stadium: RCOP-BGU Stadium; Attendance: 700; Referee: Amin Kurgheli (Gomel) |

| 24 July 2018 | Orsha (II) | 0–4 | Vitebsk | Orsha |
| 17:30 | | Report | Adamović 40'; Matsveenka 60'; Shkurin 90'; Teverov 90+1' (pen.) | Stadium: City Stadium; Attendance: 700; Referee: Yaroslav Komaritskiy (Polotsk) |

| 27 July 2018 | Lida (II) | 0–3 | Minsk | Lida |
| 18:00 | | Report | Bokhashvili 13'; Vasilyew 27'; Lavrik 88' | Stadium: Yunost Stadium; Attendance: 590; Referee: Amin Kurgheli (Gomel) |

| 27 July 2018 | Volna Pinsk (II) | 0–2 (a.e.t.) | Torpedo-BelAZ Zhodino | Pinsk |
| 18:30 | | Report | Myshenko 95'; Salugin 113' | Stadium: Volna Stadium; Attendance: 930; Referee: Vitaly Sevostyanik (Grodno) |

| 28 July 2018 | Lokomotiv Gomel (II) | 3–2 | Dnepr Mogilev | Gomel |
| 15:30 | Kozlovskiy 19'; Sanets 31' (pen.); Kudash 90' | Report | Rudyka 5'; Barsukow 58' | Stadium: Lokomotiv Stadium; Attendance: 850; Referee: Dmitry Dolya (Grodno) |

| 28 July 2018 | Belshina Bobruisk (II) | 3–1 | Neman Grodno | Bobruisk |
| 16:00 | Gomza 26'; Sidarenka 60'; Golenko 84' | Report | Moukam 69' (pen.) | Stadium: Spartak Stadium; Attendance: 930; Referee: Sergey Lobatsevich (Vitebsk) |

| 28 July 2018 | Uzda (III) | 2–3 | Smolevichi | Uzda |
| 16:30 | Sherakow 53'; Lisakovich 83' | Report | Chikida 6'; Gorbachik 38'; Shitko 72' (o.g.) | Stadium: City Stadium; Attendance: 500; Referee: Olga Tereshko (Molodechno) |

| 28 July 2018 | Slonim-2017 (II) | 1–2 | Gorodeya | Slonim |
| 17:00 | Kostyuchik 31' | Report | Pushnyakov 64'; Lebedzew 77' | Stadium: Yunost Stadium; Attendance: 720; Referee: Sergey Gorayutin (Minsk) |

| 28 July 2018 | Naftan Novopolotsk (II) | 0–1 | Slutsk | Novopolotsk |
| 17:30 | | Report | Yatskevich 31' | Stadium: Atlant Stadium; Attendance: 100; Referee: Vladimir Rusakov (Minsk) |

| 28 July 2018 | SMIautotrans Smolevichi (III) | 1–6 | Gomel | Smolevichi |
| 18:00 | Minko 14' | Report | Volkov 30', 47'; Baah 45+1'; Shapoval 54'; Shramchenko 59'; Dao 78' | Stadium: FOK Stadium; Attendance: 200; Referee: Yevgeniy Naumov (Minsk) |

| 29 July 2018 | Smorgon (II) | 0–4 | Torpedo Minsk | Smorgon |
| 15:30 | | Report | Sokol 11'; Patsko 33'; Klenyo 57', 84' | Stadium: Yunost Stadium; Attendance: 250; Referee: Dmitry Kuradovets (Pinsk) |

| 29 July 2018 | UAS Zhitkovichi (II) | 0–5 | Isloch Minsk Raion | Zhitkovichi |
| 16:00 | | Report | Rudenok 5'; Kamarowski 68', 88'; Bukatkin 79', 85' | Stadium: City Stadium; Attendance: 650; Referee: Sergey Tsinkevich (Osipovichi) |

| 29 July 2018 | Slavia Mozyr (II) | 3–2 | Luch Minsk | Mozyr |
| 16:30 | Shevchenko 31'; Kurlovich 42' (pen.); Voronkov 66' | Report | Gribovskiy 74'; Kats 90+2' | Stadium: Yunost Stadium; Attendance: 2,300; Referee: Viktor Shimusik (Osipovichi) |

| 29 July 2018 | Kletsk (III) | 2–2 (a.e.t.) (0–2 p) | Dinamo Brest | Kletsk |
| 17:00 | Lekhavitsky 48'; Yakovets 111' | Report | Babawo 10', 119' | Stadium: City Stadium; Attendance: 990; Referee: Andrey Vasilevich (Mozyr) |
| | Penalties |
| | Golovnev (penalty missed); Kalechits (penalty missed); Antsypov (penalty missed); Lekhavitsky (penalty missed) | | (penalty missed) Vitus; (penalty scored) Krivets; (penalty missed) Smolevskiy; (penalty scored) Duarte |

| 29 July 2018 | Chist (II) | 0–11 | Shakhtyor Soligorsk | Molodechno |
| 17:30 | | Report | Soiri 2', 35', 37'; Laptsew 8'; Ebong 13', 31'; Gromyko 40'; Jackson 42', 47'; Kuzmyanok 45'; Sibomana 61' | Stadium: City Stadium; Attendance: 300; Referee: Vladislav Golodukhin (Brest) |

| 29 July 2018 | Energetik-BGATU Minsk (III) | 0–7 | Dinamo Minsk | Minsk |
| 18:00 | | Report | Salavey 13', 33'; Makas 29'; Astravukh 51'; Kapov 63', 90+1'; Kaplenko 81' | Stadium: FC Minsk Stadium; Attendance: 650; Referee: Sergey Chistov (Minsk) |

== Round of 16 ==
The draw was performed on 30 June 2018.

| 11 August 2018 | Lokomotiv Gomel (II) | 3–0 | Smolevichi | Gomel |
| 17:00 | Kozlovskiy 45', 72'; Zagvozdin 51' | Report | | Stadium: Lokomotiv Stadium; Attendance: 300; Referee: Vladimir Rusakov (Minsk) |

| 11 August 2018 | Vitebsk | 0–0 (a.e.t.) (5–4 p) | Torpedo-BelAZ Zhodino | Vitebsk |
| 18:00 | | Report | | Stadium: Vitebsky CSK; Attendance: 2,350; Referee: Viktor Shimusik (Osipovichi) |
| | Penalties |
| | Teverov (penalty scored); Wanderson (penalty scored); Pyachenin (penalty scored); Naumov (penalty scored); Starhorodskyi (penalty scored) | | (penalty scored) Pavlovets; (penalty scored) Alyakhnovich; (penalty scored) Myshenko; (penalty scored) Khachaturyan; (penalty missed) Poé |

| 12 August 2018 | Torpedo Minsk | 0–2 | Slutsk | Minsk |
| 17:00 | | Report | Shikavka 14'; Zhuk 90+1' | Stadium: Traktor Stadium; Attendance: 250; Referee: Sergey Tsinkevich (Osipovichi) |

| 12 August 2018 | Gomel | 0–2 | Isloch Minsk Raion | Gomel |
| 18:00 | | Report | Slabashevich 18'; Kamarowski 42' | Stadium: Central Stadium; Attendance: 2,500; Referee: Denis Scherbakov (Minsk) |

| 12 August 2018 | Dinamo Minsk | 2–0 | Minsk | Minsk |
| 19:30 | Makas 20', 77' | Report | | Stadium: Dinamo Stadium; Attendance: 1,860; Referee: Igor Kruk (Molodechno) |

| 26 September 2018 | Shakhtyor Soligorsk | 0–0 (a.e.t.) (4–2 p) | Dinamo Brest | Soligorsk |
| 19:00 | | Report | | Stadium: Stroitel Stadium; Attendance: 2,150; Referee: Dmitry Dolya (Grodno) |
| | Penalties |
| | Sachywka (penalty scored); Balanovich (penalty scored); Rybak (penalty scored); Burko (penalty scored) | | (penalty missed) Savitski; (penalty scored) Noyok; (penalty scored) Khoblenko; (penalty missed) Krivets |

| 3 October 2018 | Slavia Mozyr (II) | 0–0 (a.e.t.) (3–4 p) | Belshina Bobruisk (II) | Mozyr |
| 15:00 | | Report | | Stadium: Yunost Stadium; Attendance: 1,250; Referee: Sergey Stetsurin (Brest) |
| | Penalties |
| | Raewski (penalty scored); Costrov (penalty missed); Shevchenko (penalty scored); Kavalewski (penalty scored); Slyusar (penalty missed) | | (penalty scored) Gomza; (penalty missed) Baiduk; (penalty scored) Shchagrykovich; (penalty scored) Turlin; (penalty scored) Ignatenko |

| 17 November 2018 | BATE Borisov | 0–0 (a.e.t.) (4–2 p) | Gorodeya | Borisov |
| 16:00 | | Report | | Stadium: Borisov Arena; Attendance: 2,411; Referee: Viktor Shimusik (Osipovichi) |
| | Penalties |
| | Volkov (penalty scored); Gordeichuk (penalty scored); Filipović (penalty scored); Yablonskiy (penalty scored) | | (penalty missed) Lebedzew; (penalty scored) Usenya; (penalty scored) Bashilov; (penalty missed) Ignatenko |

== Quarter-finals ==
The draw was performed on 9 October 2018. The matches were played in March 2019.

| Team 1 | Agg. | Team 2 | 1st leg | 2nd leg |
|---|---|---|---|---|
| BATE Borisov | 1–2 | Isloch Minsk Raion | 1–1 | 0–1 |
| Vitebsk | 3–1 | Lokomotiv Gomel (II) | 1–0 | 2–1 |
| Shakhtyor Soligorsk | 6–0 | Belshina Bobruisk (II) | 5–0 | 1–0 |
| Dinamo Minsk | 2–1 | Slutsk | 2–0 | 0–1 |

=== First leg ===
| 9 March 2019 | BATE Borisov | 1–1 | Isloch Minsk Raion | Borisov |
| 14:00 | Willumsson 34' | Report | Makas 36' | Stadium: Borisov Arena; Attendance: 3,529; Referee: Pavel Koronets (Zhodino) |

| 9 March 2019 | Vitebsk | 1–0 | Lokomotiv Gomel (II) | Vitebsk |
| 16:00 | Matsveenka 36' | Report | | Stadium: Vitebsky CSK; Attendance: 1,020; Referee: Viktor Shimusik (Osipovichi) |

| 10 March 2019 | Shakhtyor Soligorsk | 5–0 | Belshina Bobruisk (II) | Soligorsk |
| 14:00 | Rybak 42'; Bakaj 44', 59'; Bodul 71'; Khvashchynski 83' | Report | | Stadium: Stroitel Stadium; Attendance: 1,100; Referee: Sergey Gorayutin (Minsk) |

| 10 March 2019 | Dinamo Minsk | 2–0 | Slutsk | Minsk |
| 16:00 | Alyakhnovich 48'; Chochiyev 63' | Report | | Stadium: FC Minsk Stadium; Attendance: 1,300; Referee: Vitaly Sevostyanik (Grodno) |

=== Second leg ===
| 14 March 2019 | Isloch Minsk Raion | 1–0 (2–1 agg.) | BATE Borisov | Minsk |
| 16:30 | Kamarowski 32' | Report | | Stadium: FC Minsk Stadium; Attendance: 950; Referee: Sergey Tsinkevich (Osipovichi) |

| 15 March 2019 | Slutsk | 1–0 (1–2 agg.) | Dinamo Minsk | Bobruisk |
| 13:00 | Tsimashenka 32' | Report | | Stadium: Aleksandr Prokopenko Stadium; Attendance: 450; Referee: Sergey Lobatsevich (Vitebsk) |

| 15 March 2019 | Belshina Bobruisk (II) | 0–1 (0–6 agg.) | Shakhtyor Soligorsk | Bobruisk |
| 17:30 | | Report | Matsveychyk 74' | Stadium: Aleksandr Prokopenko Stadium; Attendance: 850; Referee: Sergey Stetsurin (Brest) |

| 16 March 2019 | Lokomotiv Gomel (II) | 1–2 (1–3 agg.) | Vitebsk | Gomel |
| 14:00 | Vashkel 42' | Report | Starhorodskyi 50' (pen.); Zolotov 89' | Stadium: SDYuSShOR-8 Stadium; Attendance: 600; Referee: Dmitry Dolya (Grodno) |

== Semi-finals ==
The draw was performed on 18 March 2019. The matches were played in April and May 2019.

| Team 1 | Agg. | Team 2 | 1st leg | 2nd leg |
|---|---|---|---|---|
| Isloch Minsk Raion | 4–6 | Shakhtyor Soligorsk | 2–2 | 2–4 (aet) |
| Vitebsk | 1–0 | Dinamo Minsk | 1–0 | 0–0 |

=== First leg ===
| 10 April 2019 | Isloch Minsk Raion | 2–2 | Shakhtyor Soligorsk | Minsk |
| 18:00 | Kamarowski 15'; Yansane 42' | Report | Bakaj 69'; Sachywka 78' | Stadium: FC Minsk Stadium; Attendance: 650; Referee: Dmitry Dmitriyev (Fanipol) |

| 10 April 2019 | Vitebsk | 1–0 | Dinamo Minsk | Vitebsk |
| 19:45 | Wanderson 36' | Report | | Stadium: Vitebsky CSK; Attendance: 5,150; Referee: Vitaly Sevostyanik (Grodno) |

=== Second leg ===
| 30 April 2019 | Dinamo Minsk | 0–0 (0–1 agg.) | Vitebsk | Minsk |
| 17:45 | | Report | | Stadium: Traktor Stadium; Attendance: 2,700; Referee: Dmitry Dmitriyev (Fanipol) |

| 1 May 2019 | Shakhtyor Soligorsk | 4–2 (a.e.t.) (6–4 agg.) | Isloch Minsk Raion | Soligorsk |
| 19:00 | Kavalyow 6'; Bakaj 39'; Yanush 101'; Matsveychyk 115' | Report | Makas 12'; Kamarowski 65' | Stadium: Stroitel Stadium; Attendance: 2,350; Referee: Denis Scherbakov (Minsk) |

== Final ==
The final was played on 26 May 2019 at Vitebsky Central Sport Complex in Vitebsk.

26 May 2019
17:00 UTC+3

| Vitebsk | 0–2 | Shakhtyor Soligorsk |
|---|---|---|
| | Report | Bodul 45'; Antić 80' |

Vitebsky CSK, Vitebsk
Attendance: 7,954
Referee: Andrey Vasilevich (Mozyr)

VITEBSK:
| GK | 1 | (Belarus) Dzmitry Hushchanka |
| RB | 4 | (Belarus) Artsyom Skitaw |
| CB | 13 | (Georgia (country)) Akaki Khubutia | (yellow card) 66' |
| CB | 17 | (Russia) Daniil Chalov | | (substituted off) 74' |
| LB | 35 | (Belarus) Nikolay Zolotov | (yellow card) 18' |
| DM | 5 | (Brazil) Wanderson Maranhão | (yellow card) 83' |
| DM | 10 | (Belarus) Mikhail Kazlow |
| RM | 11 | (Belarus) Anton Matsveenka | (yellow card) 81' |
| CAM | 29 | (Ukraine) Artem Starhorodskyi | | (substituted off) 86' |
| LM | 7 | (Belarus) Kiryl Pyachenin |
| FW | 18 | (Ukraine) Maksym Feshchuk | | (substituted off) 86' |
Substitutes:
| GK | 31 | (Belarus) Uladzimir Zhuraw |
| DF | 12 | (Belarus) Yevgeniy Klopotskiy |
| FW | 19 | (Belarus) Vladislav Fedosov |
| MF | 20 | (Belarus) Syarhey Volkaw | | (substituted on) 86' |
| DF | 25 | (Ukraine) Oleh Karamushka |
| MF | 28 | (Russia) Vladislav Ryzhkov | | (substituted on) 74' |
| MF | 90 | (Russia) Ilmir Nurisov | | (substituted on) 86' |
Manager:
(Belarus) Sergey Yasinsky

SHAKHTYOR:
| GK | 1 | (Belarus) Andrey Klimovich |
| RB | 3 | (Belarus) Syarhey Matsveychyk | (yellow card) 83' |
| CB | 18 | (Belarus) Pavel Rybak |
| CB | 20 | (Belarus) Alyaksandr Sachywka |
| LB | 5 | (Serbia) Nikola Antić |
| DM | 8 | (Belarus) Aleksandr Selyava | (yellow card) 53' |
| DM | 99 | (Belarus) Max Ebong |
| RM | 23 | (Belarus) Yury Kavalyow |
| CAM | 14 | (Belarus) Valeriy Gromyko | | (substituted off) 90' |
| LM | 28 | (Ukraine) Mykyta Tatarkov | | (substituted off) 64' |
| FW | 29 | (Austria) Darko Bodul | (yellow card) 66' | (substituted off) 70' |
Substitutes:
| GK | 35 | (Belarus) Pavel Chasnowski |
| DF | 6 | (Belarus) Ihar Burko | | (substituted on) 64' |
| FW | 9 | (Moldova) Ion Nicolaescu |
| FW | 10 | (Belarus) Mikalay Yanush | | (substituted on) 70' |
| MF | 17 | (Belarus) Alyaksandr Valadzko |
| FW | 22 | (Belarus) Uladzimir Khvashchynski |
| DF | 44 | (Ukraine) Vasyl Pryima | | (substituted on) 90' |
Manager:
(Russia) Sergei Tashuyev
