= 2016 Belarusian Super Cup =

BATE Borisov	Shakhtyor Soligorsk
2	1
- Date: 13 March 2016
- Venue: FC Minsk Stadium, Minsk
- Referee: Vitaly Sevostyanik

The 2016 Belarusian Super Cup was held on 13 March 2016 between the 2015 Belarusian Premier League champions BATE Borisov and the 2014–15 Belarusian Cup runners-up Shakhtyor Soligorsk. BATE won the match 2–1 and won the trophy for the sixth time. This was the fourth consecutive year that they won the trophy.

== Match details ==
13 March 2016
15:00 UTC+3

BATE Borisov	2–1	Shakhtyor Soligorsk
Ivanić 25'; Rodionov 59'	Report	Palyakow 81' (o.g.)

FC Minsk Stadium, Minsk
Attendance: 3,000
Referee: Vitaly Sevostyanik (Grodno)

BATE:
GK	16	(Belarus) Syarhey Chernik	(yellow card) 90+3'
DF	15	(Belarus) Maksim Zhavnerchik
DF	4	(Latvia) Kaspars Dubra
DF	33	(Belarus) Dzyanis Palyakow
DF	14	(Estonia) Artur Pikk
MF	77	(Belarus) Yury Kendysh	(yellow card) 57'
MF	7	(Belarus) Aleksandr Karnitsky	(yellow card) 27'	(substituted off) 74'
MF	17	(Belarus) Alyaksey Ryas		(substituted off) 67'
MF	22	(Belarus) Ihar Stasevich		(substituted off) 90'
MF	10	(Serbia) Mirko Ivanić
FW	20	(Belarus) Vitali Rodionov (c)		(substituted off) 80'
Substitutes:
GK	34	(Belarus) Artem Soroko
DF	3	(Belarus) Vital Hayduchyk
MF	5	(Belarus) Yevgeniy Yablonskiy		(substituted on) 90'
MF	8	(Belarus) Alyaksandr Valadzko		(substituted on) 74'
FW	18	(Belarus) Dzmitry Mazalewski		(substituted on) 80'
MF	23	(Belarus) Edhar Alyakhnovich
DF	42	(Belarus) Maksim Volodko		(substituted on) 67'
Manager:
(Belarus) Alyaksandr Yermakovich

SHAKHTYOR:
GK	16	(Belarus) Uladzimir Bushma
DF	3	(Belarus) Syarhey Matsveychyk	(yellow card) 28'	(substituted off) 80'
DF	4	(Belarus) Alyaksey Yanushkevich	(yellow card) 50'
DF	18	(Belarus) Pavel Rybak
DF	5	(Belarus) Alyaksandr Yurevich		(substituted off) 89'
MF	8	(Belarus) Aleksandr Selyava	(yellow card) 73'
MF	21	(Belarus) Yevgeniy Yelezarenko	(yellow card) 24'	(substituted off) 46'
MF	23	(Belarus) Yury Kavalyow		(substituted off) 70'
MF	11	(Ukraine) Artem Starhorodskyi (c)
FW	7	(Belarus) Dzmitry Asipenka	(yellow card) 30'	(substituted off) 64'
FW	10	(Belarus) Mikalay Yanush
Substitutes:
GK	1	(Estonia) Artur Kotenko
DF	6	(Belarus) Ihar Burko		(substituted on) 46'
MF	15	(Belarus) Nikolay Zolotov
MF	17	(Belarus) Alyaksandr Pawlaw		(substituted on) 80'
DF	19	(Belarus) Ihar Kuzmyanok		(substituted on) 89'
MF	81	(Belarus) Alyaksey Tsimashenka		(substituted on) 70'
FW	99	(Belarus) Vitaly Lisakovich		(substituted on) 64'
Manager:
(Belarus) Syarhey Nikifarenka

== See also ==
- 2015 Belarusian Premier League
- 2014–15 Belarusian Cup
