= 2020 Belarusian Super Cup =

Dinamo Brest	Shakhtyor Soligorsk
2	0
- Date: 4 March 2020
- Venue: FC Minsk Stadium, Minsk
- Referee: Aleksei Kulbakov

The 2020 Belarusian Super Cup was held on 4 March 2020 between the 2019 Belarusian Premier League champions Dinamo Brest and the 2018–19 Belarusian Cup winners Shakhtyor Soligorsk. Dinamo Brest won the match 2–0, winning the trophy for a third consecutive time.

== Match details ==
4 March 2020
19:30 UTC+3

Dinamo Brest	2 – 0	Shakhtyor Soligorsk
Kiki 3'; Savitski 31'	Report

FC Minsk Stadium, Minsk
Referee: Aleksei Kulbakov (Gomel)

DINAMO:
GK	35	(Belarus) Pavel Pavlyuchenko	(yellow card) 90'
RB	21	(Belarus) Aleh Veratsila (c)
CB	2	(Cameroon) Gaby Kiki
CB	22	(Belarus) Aleksandr Pavlovets
LB	13	(Belarus) Maksim Vitus
DM	19	(Ukraine) Oleksandr Noyok	(yellow card) 76'	(substituted off) 80'
DM	15	(Belarus) Syarhey Kislyak	(yellow card) 55'	(substituted off) 90+1'
RM	88	(Belarus) Pavel Savitski		(substituted off) 80'
CAM	10	(Ukraine) Artem Milevskyi	(yellow card) 24' (yellow-red card) 49'
LM	77	(Belarus) Mikhail Gordeichuk		(substituted off) 64'
FW	51	(Belarus) Dzyanis Laptsew		(substituted off) 63'
Substitutes:
GK	1	(Belarus) Syarhey Ignatovich
MF	5	(Belarus) Kiryl Pyachenin		(substituted on) 80'
MF	7	(Belarus) Artem Bykov		(substituted on) 63'
MF	9	(Belarus) Sergey Krivets		(substituted on) 90+1'
FW	23	(Belarus) Yevgeniy Shevchenko
FW	33	(Belarus) Vsevolod Sadovsky
DF	34	(Ukraine) Yevhen Khacheridi
MF	77	(Belarus) Roman Yuzepchuk		(substituted on) 84'
MF	99	(Albania) Elis Bakaj		(substituted on) 80'
Manager:
Sergey Kovalchuk

SHAKHTYOR:
GK	30	(Belarus) Alyaksandr Hutar (c)
RB	3	(Belarus) Syarhey Matsveychyk		(substituted off) 83'
CB	15	(Belarus) Syarhey Palitsevich
CB	20	(Belarus) Alyaksandr Sachywka
LB	5	(Serbia) Nikola Antić
DM	77	(Belarus) Yury Kendysh
RM	16	(Belarus) Syarhey Balanovich
CAM	24	(Georgia (country)) Gega Diasamidze
LM	22	(Belarus) Aleksandr Bulychev		(substituted off) 46'
FW	7	(Albania) Azdren Llullaku		(substituted off) 46'
FW	29	(Austria) Darko Bodul		(substituted off) 74'
Substitutes:
GK	35	(Belarus) Pavel Chasnowski
DF	6	(Belarus) Ihar Burko		(substituted on) 83'
MF	8	(Belarus) Aleksandr Selyava	(yellow card) 61'	(substituted on) 46'
FW	9	(Belarus) Vitaly Lisakovich		(substituted on) 74'
DF	17	(Belarus) Viktar Sotnikaw
FW	18	(Croatia) Tin Vukmanić
FW	19	(Belarus) Dzmitry Padstrelaw		(substituted on) 46'
MF	21	(Georgia (country)) Lasha Shindagoridze
FW	23	(Belarus) Uladzimir Khvashchynski
Manager:
(Ukraine) Yuriy Vernydub

== See also ==
- 2019 Belarusian Premier League
- 2018–19 Belarusian Cup
