= Aleksey Rios =

Belarusian footballer

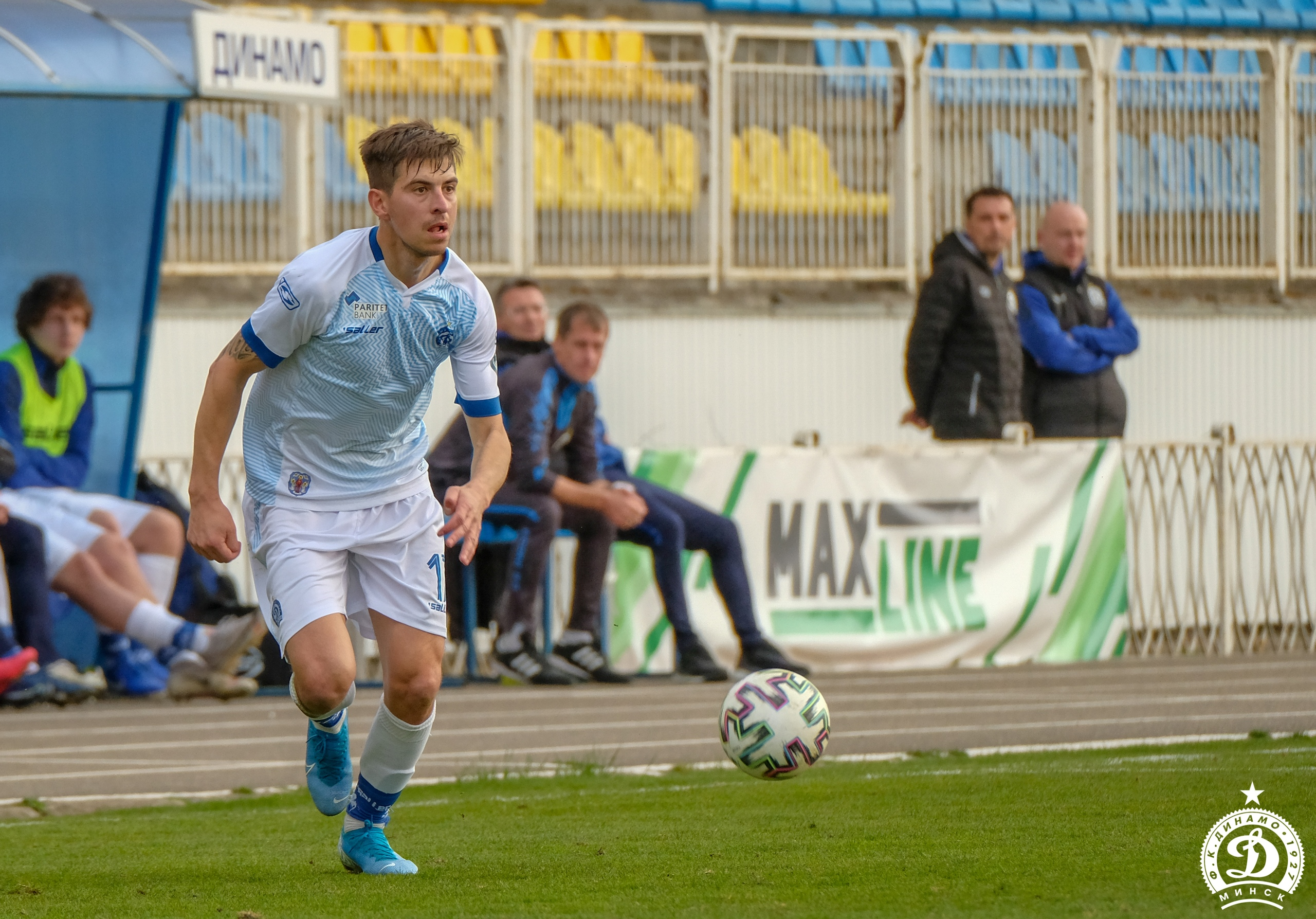
- Rios playing for Dinamo Minsk

Personal information
- Full name: Aleksey Manuelevich Rios
- Date of birth: 14 May 1987 (age 39)
- Place of birth: Minsk, Soviet Union (now Belarus)
- Height: 1.82 m (6 ft 0 in)
- Position: Midfielder

Youth career
- 2005–2006: Shakhtyor Soligorsk

Senior career*
| Years | Team | Apps | (Gls) |
| 2006–2014 | Shakhtyor Soligorsk | 189 | (31) |
| 2015–2019 | BATE Borisov | 105 | (12) |
| 2020–2021 | Dinamo Minsk | 27 | (0) |
| 2022 | SDYuShOR BFSO Dinamo Minsk | 4 | (1) |

International career
| 2016–2018 | Belarus | 10 | (1) |
- * Club domestic league appearances and goals as of 31 December 2022

Aleksey Manuelevich Rios (Belarusian: Аляксей Мануэлевіч Рыас; Russian: Алексей Мануэлевич Риос; born 14 May 1987) is a Belarusian former professional footballer.

== Club career ==
Having started his career at Dinamo Minsk Rios joined FC Shakhtyor Soligorsk in 2005 at the age of 17. At Soligorsk he debuted in the Belarusian Premier League in 2007 where he played for eight years before joining FC BATE Borisov for the 2015 season.

== Honours ==
Shakhtyor Soligorsk

- Belarusian Cup winner: 2013–14

BATE Borisov

- Belarusian Premier League champion: 2015, 2016, 2017, 2018
- Belarusian Cup winner: 2014–15, 2019–20
- Belarusian Super Cup winner: 2015, 2016, 2017

== International career ==
Rios made his debut for Belarus on 31 August 2016, after coming on as a substitute at half time in a friendly match against Norway.

=== International goal ===
Scores and results list Belarus' goal tally first.

| No. | Date | Venue | Opponent | Score | Result | Competition |
|---|---|---|---|---|---|---|
| 1. | 7 October 2016 | De Kuip, Rotterdam, Netherlands | Netherlands | 1–2 | 1–4 | 2018 FIFA World Cup qualifier |

== Personal life ==
Rios was born to a Peruvian father and a Belarusian mother in Minsk. He is married.
