= 2019 Belarusian Super Cup =

BATE Borisov	Dinamo Brest
1	3
- Date: 2 March 2019
- Venue: FC Minsk Stadium, Minsk
- Referee: Andrey Vasilevich
- Attendance: 3,000

The 2019 Belarusian Super Cup was held on 2 March 2019 between the 2018 Belarusian Premier League champions BATE Borisov and the 2017–18 Belarusian Cup winners Dinamo Brest. Dinamo Brest won the match 3–1, winning the trophy for the second time, following their first victory in the 2018 edition of the competition.

== Match details ==
2 March 2019
15:00 UTC+3

BATE Borisov	1 – 3	Dinamo Brest
Moukam 49' (pen.)	Report	Laptsew 40'; Filipović 74' (o.g.); Savitski 80'

FC Minsk Stadium, Minsk
Attendance: 3,000
Referee: Andrey Vasilevich (Mozyr)

BATE:
GK	35	(Belarus) Anton Chichkan
RB	4	(Serbia) Aleksandar Filipović	(yellow card) 42'
CB	21	(Belarus) Egor Filipenko	(yellow card) 27'
CB	23	(Belarus) Zakhar Volkov
LB	17	(Belarus) Alexei Rios	(yellow card) 27'
DM	8	(Belarus) Stanislaw Drahun
DM	5	(Belarus) Yevgeniy Yablonskiy		(substituted off) 81'
CM	7	(Belarus) Yevgeniy Berezkin		(substituted off) 72'
RM	94	(France) Hervaine Moukam	(yellow card) 53'	(substituted off) 59'
LM	22	(Belarus) Ihar Stasevich (c)
FW	9	(Belarus) Bojan Dubajić		(substituted off) 72'
Substitutes:
GK	28	(Belarus) Aleksandr Svirskiy
MF	13	(Belarus) Alexander Hleb		(substituted on) 81'
FW	15	(Belarus) Maksim Skavysh		(substituted on) 59'
MF	18	(Iceland) Willum Þór Willumsson
MF	19	(Belarus) Dmitriy Bessmertny		(substituted on) 72'
MF	25	(Belarus) Dzmitry Baha		(substituted on) 72'
DM	27	(Serbia) Slobodan Simović
Manager:
(Belarus) Alyaksey Baha

DINAMO:
GK	35	(Belarus) Pavel Pavlyuchenko	(yellow card) 90+4'
RB	21	(Belarus) Aleh Veratsila
CB	3	(Portugal) Dénis Duarte	(yellow card) 45+2'
CB	2	(Cameroon) Gaby Kiki	(yellow card) 55'
LB	13	(Belarus) Maksim Vitus
DM	19	(Ukraine) Oleksandr Noyok	(yellow card) 20'
DM	15	(Belarus) Syarhey Kislyak		(substituted off) 87'
RM	20	(Ghana) Joel Fameyeh	(yellow card) 35'	(substituted off) 73'
CAM	10	(Ukraine) Artem Milevskyi	(yellow card) 27'
LM	33	(Belarus) Pavel Nyakhaychyk (c)
FW	51	(Belarus) Dzyanis Laptsew		(substituted off) 81'
Substitutes:
GK	1	(Belarus) Artem Denisenko
GK	30	(Belarus) Alyaksandr Hutar
MF	7	(Belarus) Artem Bykov		(substituted on) 87'
MF	17	(Belarus) Pavel Sedko
DF	22	(Belarus) Aleksandr Pavlovets
MF	23	(Sweden) Ayomide Jibodu
FW	29	(Ukraine) Oleksiy Khoblenko		(substituted on) 81'
MF	72	(Belarus) Maksim Lotysh
MF	73	(Belarus) Roman Yuzepchuk
MF	77	(Belarus) Oleg Nikiforenko
MF	88	(Belarus) Pavel Savitski		(substituted on) 73'
Manager:
(Czech Republic) Marcel Lička

== See also ==
- 2018 Belarusian Premier League
- 2017–18 Belarusian Cup
