= Yury Kavalyow =

Belarusian footballer

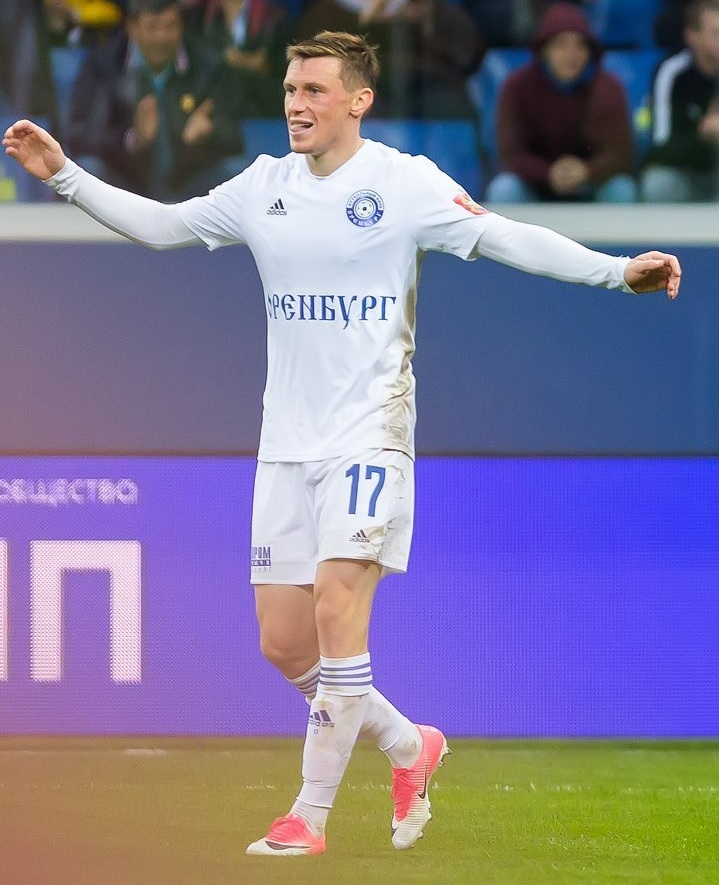
- Kavalyow with Orenburg in 2022

Personal information
- Full name: Yury Uladzimiravich Kavalyow
- Date of birth: 27 January 1993 (age 33)
- Place of birth: Byalynichy, Mogilev Oblast, Belarus
- Height: 1.74 m (5 ft 9 in)
- Position: Midfielder

Team information
- Current team: BATE Borisov
- Number: 17

Youth career
- 2010–2012: Shakhtyor Soligorsk

Senior career*
Years	Team	Apps	(Gls)
2012–2019	Shakhtyor Soligorsk	173	(20)
2020–2021	Arsenal Tula	16	(1)
2021	→ Arsenal-2 Tula	3	(2)
2021–2023	Orenburg	58	(6)
2024–2026	Baltika Kaliningrad	50	(3)
2026–	BATE Borisov	6	(0)

International career^{‡}
2012–2014	Belarus U21	22	(1)
2017–	Belarus	29	(2)
- * Club domestic league appearances and goals as of 7 September 2026 ‡ National team caps and goals as of 5 September 2025

Yury Uladzimiravich Kavalyow (Belarusian: Юрый Уладзіміравіч Кавалёў; Russian: Юрий Владимирович Ковалёв; born 27 January 1993) is a Belarusian professional football who plays as a right midfielder or left midfielder for BATE Borisov and for the Belarus national team. He has also played for Belarus U21.

== Club career ==
On 15 January 2020, he signed a 2.5-year contract with Russian Premier League club Arsenal Tula.

On 12 January 2024, Kavalyow's contract with Orenburg was terminated by mutual consent.

On 7 February 2024, Kavalyow signed a contract with Baltika Kaliningrad until the end of the 2023–24 season, with an option to extend for 2024–25. On 30 May 2024, the performance-based option was triggered, automatically extending his contract for the 2024–25 season. On 29 May 2026, Kavalyow extended his contract with Baltika until 10 June 2027. He left Baltika by mutual consent on 14 July 2026.

== International career ==
Kavalyow made his first appearance for the national team on 10 October 2017, playing the first 65 minutes of the 1–2 loss against France in a 2018 World Cup qualifier.

== Career statistics ==
=== Club ===
As of match played 17 May 2026

Appearances and goals by club, season and competition
Club	Season	League			Cup		Continental		Other		Total	
Club	Season	Division	Apps	Goals	Apps	Goals	Apps	Goals	Apps	Goals	Apps	Goals
Shakhtyor Soligorsk	2012	Belarusian Premier League	0	0	1	0	0	0	–		1	0
Shakhtyor Soligorsk	2013	Belarusian Premier League	20	0	1	0	2 (Note: Appearances in the UEFA Europa League)	0	–		23	0
Shakhtyor Soligorsk	2014	Belarusian Premier League	19	0	1	0	1	0	–		21	0
Shakhtyor Soligorsk	2015	Belarusian Premier League	21	2	8	0	4	0	1 (Note: Appearances in the Belarusian Super Cup)	0	34	2
Shakhtyor Soligorsk	2016	Belarusian Premier League	29	4	4	0	4	0	1	0	38	4
Shakhtyor Soligorsk	2017	Belarusian Premier League	27	3	5	0	2	1	–		34	4
Shakhtyor Soligorsk	2018	Belarusian Premier League	30	5	3	1	4	0	–		37	6
Shakhtyor Soligorsk	2019	Belarusian Premier League	27	6	4	1	6	0	–		37	7
Shakhtyor Soligorsk	Total		173	20	27	2	23	1	2	0	225	23
Arsenal Tula	2019–20	Russian Premier League	5	0	–		–		–		5	0
Arsenal Tula	2020–21	Russian Premier League	11	1	2	0	–		–		13	1
Arsenal Tula	Total		16	1	2	0	0	0	0	0	18	1
Arsenal-2 Tula	2021–22	Russian Second League	3	2	–		–		–		3	2
Orenburg	2021–22	Russian First League	27	4	0	0	–		2 (Note: Appearances in the promotion play-offs)	0	29	4
Orenburg	2022–23	Russian Premier League	20	2	5	0	–		–		25	2
Orenburg	2023–24	Russian Premier League	11	0	6	0	–		–		17	0
Orenburg	Total		58	6	11	0	0	0	2	0	71	6
Baltika	2023–24	Russian Premier League	12	1	5	0	–		–		17	1
Baltika	2024–25	Russian First League	21	2	0	0	–		–		21	2
Baltika	2025–26	Russian Premier League	17	0	7	0	–		–		24	0
Baltika	Total		50	3	12	0	0	0	0	0	62	3
Career total			300	32	52	2	23	1	4	0	379	35

=== International ===
As of match played 5 September 2025

Appearances and goals by national team and year
National team	Year	Apps	Goals
Belarus	2017	3	0
Belarus	2018	6	1
Belarus	2019	7	0
Belarus	2020	0	0
Belarus	2021	0	0
Belarus	2022	0	0
Belarus	2023	6	0
Belarus	2024	5	1
Belarus	2025	2	0
Total		29	2

Scores and results list Belarus' goal tally first.

No.	Date	Venue	Opponent	Score	Result	Competition
1.	8 September 2018	Dinamo Stadium, Minsk, Belarus	San Marino	5–0	5–0	2018–19 UEFA Nations League
2.	18 November 2024	Vasil Levski National Stadium, Sofia, Bulgaria	Bulgaria	1–1	1–1	2024–25 UEFA Nations League

== Honours ==
Shakhtyor Soligorsk

- Belarusian Cup winner: 2013–14, 2018–19

== Personal life ==
His younger brother Anton Kavalyow is also professional footballer.
