= Aleksandr Pavlovets =

Belarusian footballer (born 1996)

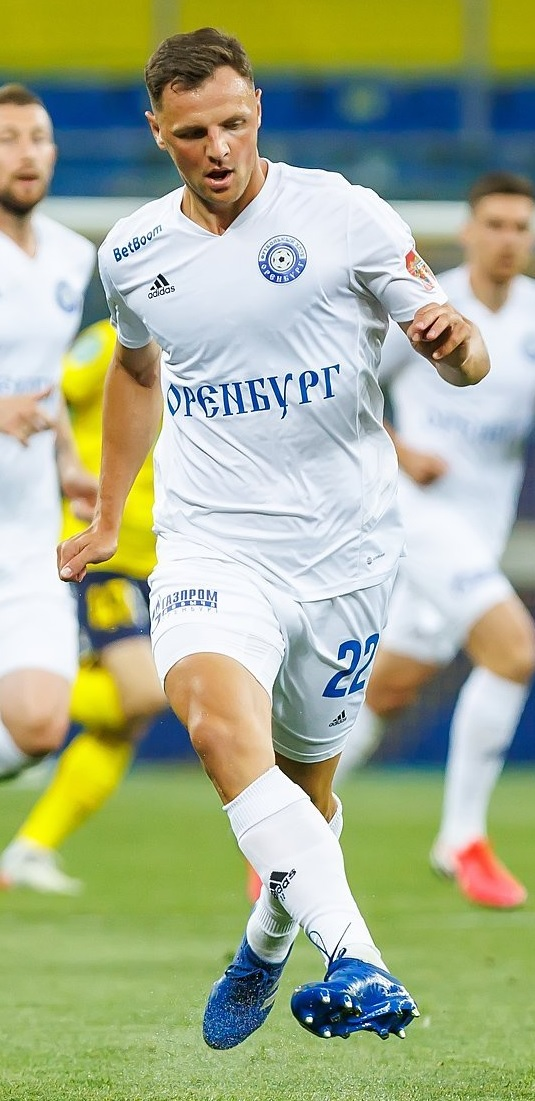
- Pavlovets with Orenburg in 2022

Personal information
- Date of birth: 13 August 1996 (age 30)
- Place of birth: Borisov, Belarus
- Height: 1.88 m (6 ft 2 in)
- Position: Centre-back

Team information
- Current team: Dynamo Brest
- Number: 22

Youth career
- 2012–2014: BATE Borisov

Senior career*
Years	Team	Apps	(Gls)
2014–2015	BATE Borisov	0	(0)
2015	→ Torpedo-BelAZ Zhodino (loan)	9	(0)
2016–2018	Torpedo-BelAZ Zhodino	63	(3)
2016	→ Neman Grodno (loan)	15	(0)
2019–2020	Dynamo Brest	43	(1)
2020–2022	Rostov	5	(0)
2021–2022	→ Kolos Kovalivka (loan)	11	(0)
2022	→ Warta Poznań (loan)	4	(0)
2022–2024	Orenburg	7	(0)
2023–2024	→ Lamia (loan)	6	(0)
2024	→ Karmiotissa (loan)	15	(0)
2024–2025	Ararat-Armenia	13	(0)
2025–	Dynamo Brest	23	(0)

International career^{‡}
2012–2013	Belarus U17	5	(1)
2014	Belarus U19	3	(0)
2015–2018	Belarus U21	20	(0)
2017	Belarus B	1	(0)
2017–	Belarus	10	(0)
- * Club domestic league appearances and goals as of 6 July 2026 ‡ National team caps and goals as of 18 November 2023

Aleksandr Pavlovets (Belarusian: Аляксандар Паўлавец; Russian: Александр Павловец; born 13 August 1996) is a Belarusian professional footballer who plays as a centre-back, for Dynamo Brest and the Belarus national team. He has also played for the national youth teams.

== Club career ==
On 2 September 2020, Russian Premier League club FC Rostov announced that they signed Pavlovets and he would join the team upon the expiration of his contract with Dinamo Brest in the winter of 2020–21. On 14 October 2020, Rostov confirmed that he would join the club before the Russian transfer window closes on 19 October. On 7 July 2021, he was loaned to Kolos Kovalivka for the 2021–22 season. On 22 April 2022, Pavlovets moved on loan to Warta Poznań in Poland until the end of June 2022.

On 16 June 2022, Pavlovets moved to Orenburg. On 18 January 2023, Pavlovets joined PAS Lamia 1964 in Greece on loan.

On 18 July 2024, Armenian Premier League club Ararat-Armenia announced the signing of Pavlovets from Orenburg. On 6 June 2025, Ararat-Armenia announced the departure of Pavlovets.

On 21 June 2025, Dynamo Brest announced the return of Pavlovets to the club, on a contract until the end of 2026.

== Career statistics ==
As of match played 6 July 2026

Club	Season	League			Cup		Continental		Other		Total	
Club	Season	Division	Apps	Goals	Apps	Goals	Apps	Goals	Apps	Goals	Apps	Goals
BATE Borisov	2014	Belarusian Premier League	0	0	0	0	0	0	—		0	0
Torpedo-BelAZ Zhodino	2015	Belarusian Premier League	9	0	3	1	0	0	—		12	1
Torpedo-BelAZ Zhodino	2016	Belarusian Premier League	8	0	4	0	0	0	—		12	0
Torpedo-BelAZ Zhodino	2017	Belarusian Premier League	26	1	3	0	—		1 (Note: Appearances in the Belarusian Super Cup)	0	30	1
Torpedo-BelAZ Zhodino	2018	Belarusian Premier League	29	2	2	0	—		—		31	2
Torpedo-BelAZ Zhodino	Total		72	3	12	1	0	0	1	0	85	4
Neman Grodno (loan)	2016	Belarusian Premier League	15	0	1	0	—		–		16	0
Dinamo Brest	2019	Belarusian Premier League	23	0	2	0	—		0	0	25	0
Dinamo Brest	2020	Belarusian Premier League	20	1	5	0	1 (Note: Appearance in the UEFA Champions League)	0	1	0	27	1
Dinamo Brest	Total		43	1	7	0	1	0	1	0	52	1
Rostov	2020–21	Russian Premier League	5	0	0	0	—		—		5	0
Kolos Kovalivka	2021–22	Ukrainian Premier League	11	0	1	0	1 (Note: Appearance in the UEFA Europa Conference League)	0	—		13	0
Warta Poznań	2021–22	Ekstraklasa	4	0	—		—		—		4	0
Orenburg	2022–23	Russian Premier League	7	0	5	2	—		—		12	2
Lamia (loan)	2022–23	Super League Greece	3	0	2	1	—		—		5	1
Lamia (loan)	2023–24	Super League Greece	6	0	0	0	—		—		6	0
Lamia (loan)	Total		9	0	2	1	—		—		11	1
Karmiotissa (loan)	2023–24	Cypriot First Division	15	0	—		—		—		15	0
Ararat-Armenia	2024–25	Armenian Premier League	13	0	1	0	0	0	—		14	0
Dinamo Brest	2025	Belarusian Premier League	12	0	1	0	2 (Note: Appearance in the UEFA Conference League)	0	0	0	15	0
Dinamo Brest	2026	Belarusian Premier League	11	0	1	0	0	0	0	0	12	0
Dinamo Brest	Total		23	0	2	0	2	0	0	0	27	0
Career total			217	4	31	4	4	0	2	0	254	8

== Honours ==
Torpedo-BelAZ Zhodino

- Belarusian Cup: 2015–16

Dinamo Brest

- Belarusian Premier League: 2019
- Belarusian Super Cup: 2019, 2020
