= Yevgeny Shevchenko =

Belarusian footballer

Personal information
- Full name: Yevgeny Aleksandrovich Shevchenko
- Date of birth: 6 June 1996 (age 30)
- Place of birth: Minsk, Belarus
- Height: 1.82 m (6 ft 0 in)
- Position: Forward

Team information
- Current team: Slavia Mozyr
- Number: 21

Youth career
- 2011–2014: Minsk

Senior career*
Years	Team	Apps	(Gls)
2014–2019	Minsk	106	(12)
2020	Dinamo Brest	7	(0)
2020–2021	Rukh Brest	41	(8)
2022–2023	Torpedo-BelAZ Zhodino	56	(10)
2024	Arsenal Tula	21	(0)
2025	Dinamo Minsk	17	(1)
2026–	Slavia Mozyr	14	(1)

International career^{‡}
2012–2013	Belarus U17	4	(0)
2014	Belarus U19	2	(0)
2016–2018	Belarus U21	13	(2)
2017	Belarus B	1	(0)
2019–2020	Belarus	2	(0)
- * Club domestic league appearances and goals as of 6 July 2026 ‡ National team caps and goals as of 26 February 2020

Yevgeny Aleksandrovich Shevchenko (Belarusian: Яўген Аляксандравіч Шаўчэнка; Russian: Евгений Александрович Шевченко; born 6 June 1996) is a Belarusian footballer who plays as a forward for Slavia Mozyr.

== International career ==
He made his Belarus national football team debut on 13 October 2019 in a Euro 2020 qualifier against Netherlands. He substituted Dzyanis Laptsew in the 83rd minute.

== Honours ==
Dinamo Brest

- Belarusian Super Cup winner: 2020
