= Alyaksandr Sachywka =

Belarusian footballer

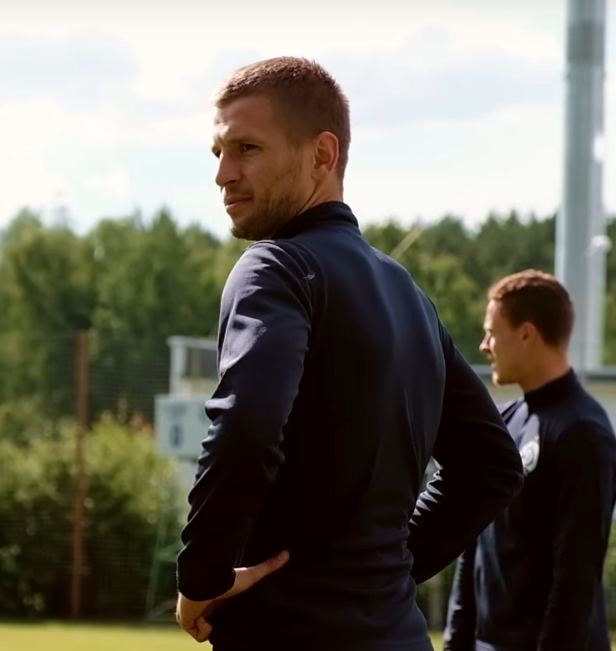

Personal information
- Full name: Alyaskandr Uladzimiravich Sachywka
- Date of birth: 5 January 1986 (age 40)
- Place of birth: Minsk, Belarusian SSR, Soviet Union
- Height: 1.83 m (6 ft 0 in)
- Position: Midfielder

Youth career
- Torpedo Minsk
- 2003: Dinamo Minsk

Senior career*
Years	Team	Apps	(Gls)
2004	Darida Minsk Raion	0	(0)
2005	Smena Minsk	28	(1)
2006–2016	Minsk	270	(18)
2017–2018	Dinamo Minsk	32	(3)
2018–2021	Shakhtyor Soligorsk	78	(5)
2022–2024	Dinamo Minsk	37	(6)
2025	Uzda		

International career^{‡}
2006–2009	Belarus U21	12	(0)
2017–2021	Belarus	12	(1)
- * Club domestic league appearances and goals as of 9 December 2025 ‡ National team caps and goals as of 8 September 2021

Alyaksandr Uladzimiravich Sachywka (Belarusian: Аляксандр Уладзіміравіч Сачыўка; Russian: Александр Владимирович Сачивко; born 5 January 1986) is a Belarusian professional footballer.

== International career ==
Sachywka was called up to the senior Belarus squad for a UEFA Euro 2016 qualifier against Macedonia in October 2015. He earned his first cap on 1 June 2017, playing as a starter in the 0:1 loss against Switzerland in a friendly match, being substituted shortly after the hour mark.

== International goals ==
Scores and results list Belarus' goal tally first.

No.	Date	Venue	Opponent	Score	Result	Competition
1.	11 October 2020	LFF Stadium, Vilnius, Lithuania	Lithuania	2–1	2–2	2020–21 UEFA Nations League C

== Honours ==
Minsk

- Belarusian Cup winner: 2012–13

Shakhtyor Soligorsk

- Belarusian Premier League champion: 2020, 2021
- Belarusian Cup winner: 2018–19
- Belarusian Super Cup winner: 2021
