= Yevgeny Yablonsky =

Belarusian footballer

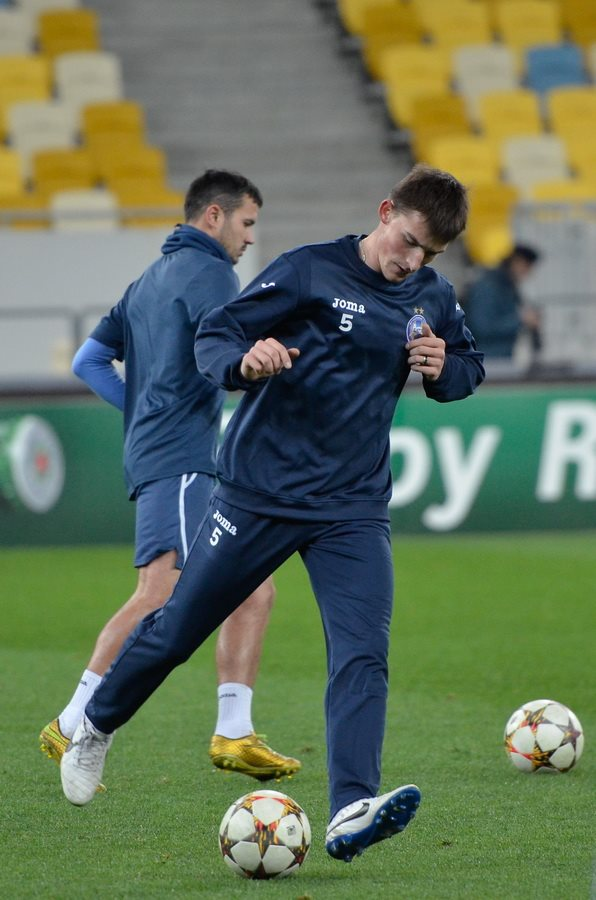
- Yablonsky with BATE Borisov in 2014

Personal information
- Full name: Yevgeny Vladimirovich Yablonsky
- Date of birth: 10 May 1995 (age 31)
- Place of birth: Chervyen’, Minsk Oblast, Belarus
- Height: 1.82 m (5 ft 11 1/2 in)
- Position: Midfielder

Team information
- Current team: Asteras Tripolis
- Number: 5

Youth career
- 2012–2013: BATE Borisov

Senior career*
Years	Team	Apps	(Gls)
2014–2021	BATE Borisov	181	(10)
2022–2023	Aris Limassol	40	(0)
2024–	Asteras Tripolis	61	(5)

International career^{‡}
2013	Belarus U19	3	(0)
2014–2016	Belarus U21	30	(4)
2019–	Belarus	52	(6)
- * Club domestic league appearances and goals as of 14 June 2026 ‡ National team caps and goals as of 5 June 2026

Yevgeny Vladimirovich Yablonsky (Belarusian: Яўген Уладзіміравіч Яблонскі; Russian: Евгений Владимирович Яблонский; born 10 May 1995) is a Belarusian professional footballer who plays as a midfielder for Greek Super League club Asteras Tripolis and the Belarus national team.

== Honours ==
BATE Borisov

- Belarusian Premier League: 2014, 2015, 2016, 2017, 2018
- Belarusian Cup: 2014–15, 2019–20, 2020–21
- Belarusian Super Cup: 2015, 2016, 2017

== International goals ==
Scores and results list Belarus' goal tally first.

No.	Date	Venue	Opponent	Score	Result	Competition
1.	14 October 2020	Dinamo Stadium, Minsk, Belarus	Kazakhstan	1–0	2–0	2020–21 UEFA Nations League C
2.	15 November 2020	Dinamo Stadium, Minsk, Belarus	Lithuania	1–0	2–0	2020–21 UEFA Nations League C
3.	16 November 2021	Dinamo Stadium, Minsk, Belarus	Jordan	1–0	1–0	Friendly
4.	20 March 2025	Pamir Stadium, Dushanbe, Tajikistan	Tajikistan	4–0	5–0	Friendly
5.	29 March 2026	Vazgen Sargsyan Republican Stadium, Yerevan, Armenia	Armenia	1–0	2–1	Friendly
6.	5 June 2026	National Football Stadium, Minsk, Belarus	Syria	4–0	4–1	Friendly
