= Vyarheychyk =

Vyarheychyk is a Belarusian surname (Belarusian: Вяргейчык) Notable people with the surname include:

- Kiryl Vyarheychyk (born 1991), Belarusian footballer
- Yury Vyarheychyk (born 1968), Belarusian footballer and manager, father of Kiryl
