= Oleksandr Noyok =

Ukrainian footballer

Oleksandr Noyok Олександр Нойок
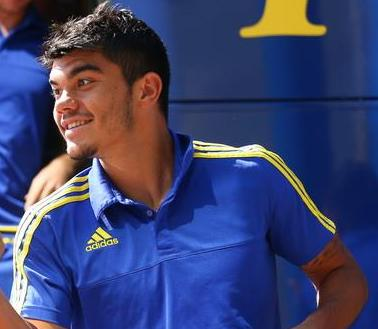

Personal information
- Full name: Oleksandr Viktorovych Noyok
- Date of birth: 15 May 1992 (age 34)
- Place of birth: Kherson, Ukraine
- Height: 1.75 m (5 ft 9 in)
- Position: Midfielder

Team information
- Current team: Kyzylzhar
- Number: 55

Youth career
- 2004: Osvita Kherson
- 2005–2009: Shakhtar Donetsk

Senior career*
Years	Team	Apps	(Gls)
2009–2013	Shakhtar Donetsk	0	(0)
2009	→ Shakhtar-3 Donetsk	14	(0)
2010–2011	→ Zakarpattia Uzhhorod (loan)	19	(0)
2013–2015	Metalist Kharkiv	13	(0)
2014–2015	→ Metalurh Donetsk (loan)	22	(0)
2016–2018	Dinamo Minsk	68	(5)
2018–2020	Dynamo Brest	60	(10)
2021	Orenburg	14	(0)
2021	Rukh Brest	14	(3)
2022	Apollon Limassol	9	(1)
2022–2023	Maccabi Bnei Reineh	13	(0)
2023–2024	Atyrau	45	(6)
2025–2026	Kyzylzhar	22	(0)
2026	Atyrau	15	(0)
2026–	Kyzylzhar	13	(1)

International career^{‡}
2007–2008	Ukraine U16	9	(1)
2008–2009	Ukraine U17	13	(2)
2009–2010	Ukraine U18	17	(1)
2010–2011	Ukraine U19	8	(0)
2012	Ukraine U20	4	(0)
2012–2014	Ukraine U21	17	(4)
- * Club domestic league appearances and goals as of 1 November 2026 ‡ National team caps and goals as of 28 June 2015

Oleksandr Viktorovych Noyok (Ukrainian: Олександр Вікторович Нойок; born 15 May 1992) is a Ukrainian professional footballer who plays as a midfielder for Kazakhstan Premier League club Kyzylzhar.

== Career ==
Noyok attended the FC Shakhtar Donetsk sportive school. He was loaned to FC Zakarpattia Uzhhorod in Ukrainian First League on 15 July 2010.

Noyok went on to sign with FC Metalist Kharkiv in the Ukrainian Premier League in April 2013. After being loaned to Metalurh Donetsk for 22 games, he signed with Dinamo Minsk on 11 March 2016.

== Honours ==
Dynamo Brest

- Belarusian Premier League: 2019
- Belarusian Super Cup: 2019, 2020

Apollon Limassol

- Cypriot First Division: 2021–22
