= 2016 Belarusian Premier League =

Belarusian Premier League
- Season: 2016
- Dates: 1 April – 27 November 2016
- Champions: BATE Borisov
- Relegated: Belshina Bobruisk; Granit Mikashevichi
- Champions League: BATE Borisov
- Europa League: Dinamo Brest; Shakhtyor Soligorsk; Dinamo Minsk
- Matches: 240
- Goals: 577 (2.4 per match)
- Top goalscorer: Mikhail Gordeichuk; Vitali Rodionov (14 goals each)
- Biggest home win: 4 matches: BATE Borisov 5–0 Krumkachy Minsk (15 June 2016) Torpedo-BelAZ 5–0 Granit Mikashevichi (20 August 2016) Dinamo Minsk 5–0 Granit Mikashevichi (17 September 2016) BATE Borisov 5–0 Gorodeya (27 November 2016)
- Biggest away win: Granit Mikashevichi 0–7 Minsk (19 November 2016)
- Highest scoring: Slavia Mozyr 6–2 Minsk (12 May 2016); Minsk 6–2 Slavia Mozyr (16 September 2016)

The 2016 Belarusian Premier League was the 26th season of top-tier football in Belarus. The season began on 1 April 2016 and concluded on 27 November 2016. BATE Borisov were the defending champions, having won their 12th league title last year; they successfully defended their title this season.

== Teams ==
Locations of teams in the 2016 Belarusian Premier League

Three best teams of 2015 First League (Isloch Minsk Raion, Gorodeya and Krumkachy Minsk) were promoted to the league, which was expanded from 14 to 16 clubs.

The last-placed team of 2015 Premier League, Gomel, were relegated.

Team	Location	Venue	Capacity	Position in 2015
BATE	Borisov	Borisov Arena	13,126	1
Belshina	Bobruisk	Spartak Stadium	3,700	4
Dinamo Brest	Brest	OSK Brestskiy	10,162	12
Dinamo Minsk	Minsk	Traktor Stadium	17,600	2
Gorodeya	Gorodeya	Gorodeya Stadium	1,020	First League, 2
Granit	Mikashevichi	Polesye Stadium (Luninets)	3,090	5
Isloch	Minsk Raion	City Stadium (Molodechno)	4,800	First League, 1
Krumkachy	Minsk	FC Minsk Stadium	3,000	First League, 3
Minsk	Minsk	FC Minsk Stadium	3,000	6
Naftan	Novopolotsk	Atlant Stadium	4,500	9
Neman	Grodno	Neman Stadium	8,479	8
Shakhtyor	Soligorsk	Stroitel Stadium	4,200	3
Slavia	Mozyr	Yunost Stadium	5,133	10
Slutsk	Slutsk	City Stadium	1,896	11
Torpedo-BelAZ	Zhodino	Torpedo Stadium	6,524	7
Vitebsk	Vitebsk	Vitebsky CSK	8,144	13

1. Five games played at Aleksandr Prokopenko Stadium in Bobruisk.
2. One game played at RCOP-BGU Stadium, one game at FC Minsk Stadium (both in Minsk) and three games Urozhay Stadium in Nesvizh due to renovation works at Gorodeya Stadium.
3. Isloch spent the season at City Stadium in Molodechno, as their previous home venue RCOP-BGU Stadium in Minsk did not meet Premier League criteria. In addition, one game was played at KFP Minsk and one game at FC Minsk Stadium.
4. Krumkachy spent the season at FC Minsk Stadium, as their previous home venue SOK Olimpiysky in Minsk did not meet Premier League criteria.

== League table ==
Pos	Team	Pld	W	D	L	GF	GA	GD	Pts	Qualification or relegation
1	BATE Borisov (C)	30	22	4	4	73	25	+48	70	Qualification for the Champions League second qualifying round
2	Shakhtyor Soligorsk	30	17	8	5	46	20	+26	59	Qualification for the Europa League first qualifying round
3	Dinamo Minsk	30	15	10	5	46	28	+18	55	Qualification for the Europa League first qualifying round
4	Minsk	30	15	8	7	49	24	+25	53	
5	Torpedo-BelAZ Zhodino	30	13	9	8	47	33	+14	48	
6	Vitebsk	30	12	6	12	30	26	+4	42	
7	Isloch Minsk Raion	30	11	8	11	33	39	−6	41	
8	Dinamo Brest	30	11	7	12	38	38	0	40	Qualification for the Europa League second qualifying round (Note: Dinamo Brest qualified for the Europa League second qualifying round by winning the 2016–17 Belarusian Cup.)
9	Gorodeya	30	8	14	8	36	39	−3	38	
10	Slavia Mozyr	30	9	8	13	33	49	−16	35	
11	Krumkachy Minsk	30	9	6	15	24	39	−15	33	
12	Slutsk	30	6	12	12	22	34	−12	30	
13	Naftan Novopolotsk	30	7	8	15	25	46	−21	29 (Note: Head-to-head record; Naftan Novopolotsk–Neman Grodno 2–0, Neman Grodno–Naftan Novopolotsk 0–1.)	
14	Neman Grodno	30	7	8	15	21	36	−15	29	
15	Belshina Bobruisk (R)	30	5	10	15	34	45	−11	25 (Note: Head-to-head record; Granit Mikashevichi–Belshina Bobruisk 0–4, Belshina Bobruisk–Granit Mikashevichi 1–1.)	Relegation to the Belarusian First League
16	Granit Mikashevichi (R)	30	5	10	15	20	56	−36	25	Relegation to the Belarusian First League

Source: BFF (in Russian), Soccerway
Rules for classification: 1) Points; 2) Head-to-head points; 3) Head-to-head goal difference; 4) Head-to-head goals scored; 5) Goal difference; 6) Matches won; 7) Goals scored; 8) Play-off (only if deciding champion); 9) Draw.
(C) Champions; (R) Relegated

== Results ==
Each team played twice against every other team for a total of 30 matches.

Home \ Away	BAT	BSH	DBR	DMI	GRD	GRA	ISL	KRU	MIN	NAF	NEM	SHA	SLA	SLU	TZH	VIT
BATE Borisov		2–1	2–0	3–3	5–0	4–0	4–1	5–0	3–1	4–1	4–0	2–0	0–0	3–0	1–2	1–0
Belshina Bobruisk	2–3		4–2	1–2	0–2	1–1	0–0	1–1	0–2	1–0	1–1	0–1	2–2	0–0	1–3	0–1
Dinamo Brest	1–4	2–1		1–4	1–1	1–0	1–1	1–2	0–3	1–1	2–0	1–2	0–0	0–0	3–2	3–0
Dinamo Minsk	1–1	3–1	2–1		2–0	5–0	1–0	2–0	1–0	3–1	0–1	1–3	1–0	1–1	1–1	1–0
Gorodeya	1–1	1–1	1–1	0–0		2–0	0–0	1–1	1–2	3–0	2–1	0–1	4–2	2–0	3–3	0–2
Granit Mikashevichi	0–1	0–4	2–1	1–1	0–0		0–1	1–1	0–7	1–3	0–1	1–1	0–0	2–1	1–1	0–3
Isloch Minsk Raion	1–3	2–3	0–3 (Note: Match Isloch v Dinamo Brest originally ended 2–4 and was later changed to 0–3 as a result of match fixing investigation.)	3–1	2–0	3–2		0–0	0–4	2–0	0–0	1–3	0–1	2–0	3–2	0–0
Krumkachy Minsk	0–3	2–1	0–0	4–1	0–1	2–1	0–1		0–1	2–0	2–1	0–1	1–0	0–3	0–2	1–0
Minsk	2–3	1–1	0–1	0–0	3–1	0–0	0–1	1–0		4–0	0–1	1–0	6–2	5–2	0–0	1–0
Naftan Novopolotsk	3–2	2–2	1–0	1–1	0–0	1–1	0–2	1–0	1–1		2–0	1–1	0–1	1–0	1–3	1–2
Neman Grodno	0–1	1–0	0–4	2–3	3–0	1–1	2–1	2–2	0–1	0–1		0–1	3–1	0–0	0–3	0–0
Shakhtyor Soligorsk	0–2	3–0	3–1	0–0	2–2	4–0	3–0	0–2	0–0	2–0	1–0		5–1	0–0	3–0	1–0
Slavia Mozyr	2–1	0–2	1–4	1–0	3–3	1–3	2–1	1–0	6–2	2–0	1–0	1–1		1–1	0–1	0–4
Slutsk	0–2	2–1	0–1	1–1	1–1	0–1	2–2	2–0	0–1	1–1	0–0	1–0	1–0		1–1	2–1
Torpedo-BelAZ Zhodino	1–2	2–2	0–1	0–2	1–3	5–0	1–1	3–0	0–0	2–1	1–0	1–1	2–0	2–0		1–2
Vitebsk	2–1	1–0	1–0	0–2	1–1	0–1	1–2	2–1	0–0	2–0	1–1	1–3	1–1	2–0	0–1	

Source: BFF (in Russian), Soccerway
Legend: Blue = home team win; Yellow = draw; Red = away team win.

== Top goalscorers ==
Rank	Goalscorer	Team	Goals
1	(Belarus) Vitali Rodionov	BATE Borisov	15
1	(Belarus) Mikhail Gordeichuk	BATE Borisov	15
3	(Belarus) Vadzim Dzemidovich	Torpedo Zhodino	12
3	(Belarus) Mikalay Yanush	Shakhtyor Soligorsk	12
5	(Ghana) Joel Fameyeh	Belshina Bobruisk	10
6	(Belarus) Dzyanis Laptsew	Slavia Mozyr / Shakhtyor Soligorsk	9
6	(Belarus) Roman Volkov	Vitebsk	9
8	(Georgia (country)) Valerian Gvilia	Minsk / BATE Borisov	8
8	(Belarus) Dzmitry Lebedzew	Gorodeya	8
8	(Belarus) Anton Saroka	Gorodeya	8
8	(Belarus) Uladzimir Khvashchynski	Dinamo Minsk	8
8	(Serbia) Nemanja Čović	Minsk	8
8	(Belarus) Artsyom Salavey	Vitebsk	8
8	(Belarus) Terentiy Lutsevich	Granit Mikashevichi / Torpedo Zhodino	8

Updated to games played on 27 November 2016
Source: football.by

== See also ==
- 2016 Belarusian First League
- 2015–16 Belarusian Cup
- 2016–17 Belarusian Cup
