= Nikita Lazovskiy =

Belarusian professional footballer

Personal information
- Date of birth: 16 August 1999 (age 27)
- Place of birth: Minsk, Belarus
- Height: 1.87 m (6 ft 2 in)
- Position: Goalkeeper

Youth career
- 2016–2018: Dinamo Minsk

Senior career*
Years	Team	Apps	(Gls)
2018–2022	Dinamo Minsk	0	(0)
2019	→ Oshmyany (loan)	8	(0)
2020	→ Smolevichi (loan)	6	(0)

International career
2017	Belarus U19		
- * Club domestic league appearances and goals as of 31 December 2020

Nikita Lazovskiy (Belarusian: Мікіта Лазоўскі; Russian: Никита Лазовский; born 16 August 1999) is a Belarusian professional footballer.
