= Pavel Vakulich =

Belarusian footballer

Personal information
- Date of birth: 14 September 1996 (age 30)
- Place of birth: Ivatsevichi, Brest Oblast, Belarus
- Position: Midfielder

Team information
- Current team: Unixlabs Minsk
- Number: 5

Youth career
- 2013–2014: Shakhtyor Soligorsk
- 2015–2016: Slutsk

Senior career*
Years	Team	Apps	(Gls)
2016	Slutsk	2	(0)
2016	→ Smorgon (loan)	12	(0)
2017	Torpedo Minsk	2	(0)
2017	→ Baranovichi (loan)	10	(0)
2018–2019	Smorgon	36	(0)
2019–2020	Oshmyany	39	(1)
2021	Uzda	1	(0)
2022–	Unixlabs Minsk	60	(13)
- * Club domestic league appearances and goals as of 6 July 2026

Pavel Vakulich (Belarusian: Павел Вакуліч; Russian: Павел Вакулич; born 14 September 1996) is a Belarusian professional footballer who plays for Unixlabs Minsk.
