= Pavel Rybak =

Belarusian footballer

Personal information
- Full name: Pavel Alyaksandravich Rybak
- Date of birth: 11 September 1983 (age 43)
- Place of birth: Grodno, Byelorussian SSR, Soviet Union
- Height: 1.88 m (6 ft 2 in)
- Position: Defender

Youth career
- SDYuShOR-6 Grodno

Senior career*
Years	Team	Apps	(Gls)
2001	Torpedo-MAZ Minsk	9	(0)
2002–2006	Lokomotiv Minsk	57	(3)
2003	→ Lida (loan)	7	(0)
2004	→ Smorgon (loan)	14	(2)
2007–2008	Gomel	41	(2)
2009–2010	Minsk	51	(1)
2011–2014	Neman Grodno	111	(3)
2015–2019	Shakhtyor Soligorsk	127	(12)
2020	Isloch Minsk Raion	14	(1)
2021	BATE Borisov	20	(1)
- * Club domestic league appearances and goals as of 31 December 2021

Pavel Alyaksandravich Rybak (Belarusian: Павел Аляксандравіч Рыбак; Russian: Павел Александрович Рыбак; born 11 September 1983) is a Belarusian former professional footballer.

== Honours ==
Shakhtyor Soligorsk

- Belarusian Cup winner: 2018–19

BATE Borisov

- Belarusian Cup winner: 2020–21
