= Pavel Chasnowski =

Belarusian footballer (born 1986)

Personal information
- Date of birth: 4 March 1986 (age 40)
- Place of birth: Minsk, Belarusian SSR
- Height: 1.92 m (6 ft 3 1/2 in)
- Position: Goalkeeper

Youth career
- Smena Minsk

Senior career*
| Years | Team | Apps | (Gls) |
| 2001 | Smena Minsk | 12 | (0) |
| 2002–2004 | BATE Borisov | 0 | (0) |
| 2005–2007 | MTZ-RIPO Minsk | 0 | (0) |
| 2007–2009 | Vitebsk | 43 | (0) |
| 2009–2010 | Ventspils | 5 | (0) |
| 2010 | → Tranzit (loan) | 4 | (0) |
| 2011 | BATE Borisov | 4 | (0) |
| 2012–2015 | Torpedo-BelAZ Zhodino | 81 | (0) |
| 2016 | Gorodeya | 30 | (0) |
| 2017 | Minsk | 29 | (0) |
| 2018–2020 | Shakhtyor Soligorsk | 15 | (0) |

International career^{‡}
| 2005–2009 | Belarus U21 | 29 | (0) |

Managerial career
- 2023–: Shakhtyor Soligorsk (gk coach)
- * Club domestic league appearances and goals as of 31 December 2020 ‡ National team caps and goals as of 2 December 2009

Pavel Chasnowski (Belarusian: Павел Часноўскі; Russian: Павел Чесновский (Pavel Chesnovskiy); born 4 March 1986) is a Belarusian former professional footballer.

== Career ==
In 2009, he moved to FK Ventspils, but just after a half of the season he left the team, because of his limited playing time, as Aleksandrs Kolinko was the team's first choice keeper. In April 2010 he joined FK Ventspils farm-club FC Tranzit on loan, but already in June left the team. Between May 2011 and January 2012, Chasnowski was under contract with BATE Borisov.

In 2002, Chasnowski played in 3 matches for the Belarus U17. In 2004, he amassed 4 caps for the Belarus U19 side. Chasnowski was the starting goalkeeper for the Belarus U21 team that participated in the UEFA U-21 Championship 2009.

== Honours ==
BATE Borisov

- Belarusian Premier League champion: 2011

Torpedo-BelAZ Zhodino

- Belarusian Cup winner: 2015–16

Shakhtyor Soligorsk

- Belarusian Premier League champion: 2020
- Belarusian Cup winner: 2018–19
