= Pavel Savitsky =

Belarusian footballer

Personal information
- Full name: Pavel Olegovich Savitsky
- Date of birth: 12 July 1994 (age 32)
- Place of birth: Grodno, Belarus
- Height: 1.75 m (5 ft 9 in)
- Position: Attacking midfielder

Team information
- Current team: Neman Grodno
- Number: 88

Youth career
- 2009–2010: Neman Grodno

Senior career*
Years	Team	Apps	(Gls)
2011–2017	Neman Grodno	180	(54)
2014–2015	→ Jagiellonia Białystok (loan)	5	(0)
2018–2020	Dinamo Brest	75	(33)
2021	Rukh Brest	26	(4)
2022–	Neman Grodno	110	(42)

International career^{‡}
2010–2011	Belarus U17	6	(10)
2011	Belarus U19	2	(1)
2012–2016	Belarus U21	38	(6)
2017	Belarus B	2	(0)
2014–	Belarus	29	(7)
- * Club domestic league appearances and goals as of 3 July 2026 ‡ National team caps and goals as of 18 November 2024

Pavel Olegovich Savitsky (Belarusian: Павел Алегавіч Савіцкі; Russian: Павел Олегович Савицкий; born 12 July 1994) is a Belarusian professional footballer who plays as an attacking midfielder for Neman Grodno and the Belarus national team.

== Career ==
Born in Grodno, Savitsky began playing football in the Neman Grodno youth system in the 2009–10 season. He joined the senior team and made his Belarusian Premier League debut in 2011.

In 2014, he was loaned to Jagiellonia Białystok in Poland. However, he only made five league appearances there and was accused of putting entertainment before football.

=== International goals ===
Scores and results list Belarus' goal tally first.

No.	Date	Venue	Opponent	Score	Result	Competition
1.	21 May 2014	Rheinpark Stadion, Vaduz, Liechtenstein	Liechtenstein	4–0	5–1	Friendly
2.	21 May 2014	Rheinpark Stadion, Vaduz, Liechtenstein	Liechtenstein	5–0	5–1	Friendly
3.	10 October 2016	Borisov Arena, Barysaw, Belarus	Luxembourg	1–0	1–1	2018 FIFA World Cup qualification
4.	9 June 2017	Borisov Arena, Barysaw, Belarus	Bulgaria	2–0	2–1	2018 FIFA World Cup qualification
5.	24 March 2021	Torpedo Stadium, Zhodzina, Belarus	Honduras	1–0	1–1	Friendly
6.	27 March 2021	Dinamo Stadium, Minsk, Belarus	Estonia	3–2	4–2	2022 FIFA World Cup qualification

== Honours ==
Dinamo Brest

- Belarusian Premier League: 2019
- Belarusian Cup: 2017–18
- Belarusian Super Cup: 2018, 2019, 2020

Individual

- Belarusian Premier League top scorer: 2018
