= Denis Laptev =

Belarusian footballer (born 1991)

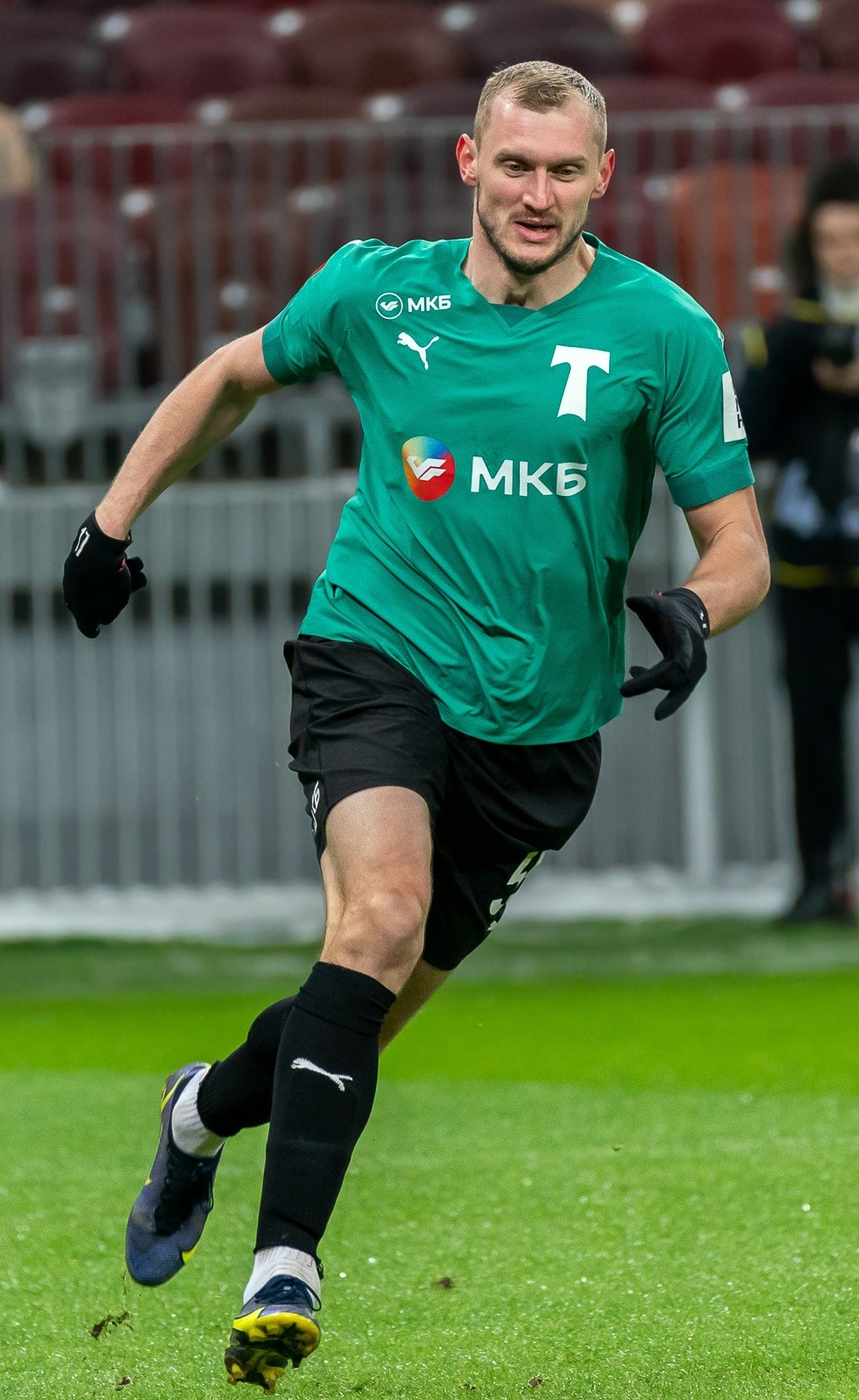
- Laptev with Torpedo Moscow in 2022

Personal information
- Full name: Denis Igorevich Laptev
- Date of birth: 1 August 1991 (age 35)
- Place of birth: Mozyr, Gomel Oblast, Belarusian SSR, Soviet Union
- Height: 1.94 m (6 ft 4 1/2 in)
- Position: Forward

Team information
- Current team: Gomel
- Number: 10

Youth career
- –2009: SDYuShOR №3 Mozyr

Senior career*
Years	Team	Apps	(Gls)
2010–2015	Slavia Mozyr	106	(47)
2010	→ Vertikal Kalinkovichi (loan)	15	(6)
2015–2016	Tosno	14	(1)
2016	→ Slavia Mozyr (loan)	15	(3)
2016	→ Shakhtyor Soligorsk (loan)	14	(6)
2017–2018	Shakhtyor Soligorsk	55	(22)
2019–2020	Dinamo Brest	55	(23)
2021	Rukh Brest	28	(9)
2022	Torpedo Moscow	17	(5)
2023	BATE Borisov	24	(8)
2024	Torpedo-BelAZ Zhodino	13	(1)
2025	Dinamo Brest	8	(0)
2025–	Gomel	22	(7)

International career^{‡}
2015–2024	Belarus	33	(1)
- * Club domestic league appearances and goals as of 6 July 2026 ‡ National team caps and goals as of 21 March 2024

Denis Igorevich Laptev (Belarusian: Дзяніс Ігаравіч Лапцеў; Russian: Денис Игоревич Лаптев; born 1 August 1991) is a Belarusian footballer who plays as a forward for Gomel.

== Club career ==
Laptev started his career at Slavia Mozyr. He made his debut in the Russian Football National League for Tosno on 16 July 2015 in a game against Baikal Irkutsk. He later returned to Belarus, where he played for Shakhtyor Soligorsk, Dinamo Brest and Rukh Brest. He then transferred to Torpedo Moscow in January 2022, before joining BATE Borisov in February 2023.

== International career ==
Laptev made his debut for the Belarus senior national team on 7 June 2015, appearing as a second-half substitute in a friendly match against Russia. On 18 November 2023, he scored his first international goal in a 1–0 victory over Andorra during the UEFA Euro 2024 qualifying.

== Honours ==
Shakhtyor Soligorsk

- Belarusian Cup winner: 2018–19

Dinamo Brest

- Belarusian Premier League champion: 2019
- Belarusian Super Cup winner: 2019, 2020

Torpedo Moscow

- Russian Football National League : 2021-22

== Career statistics ==
As of 27 November 2022

Club	Season	League			Cup		Continental		Other		Total	
Club	Season	Division	Apps	Goals	Apps	Goals	Apps	Goals	Apps	Goals	Apps	Goals
Vertikal Kalinkovichi	2010	Belarusian Second League	15	6	–		–		–		15	6
Slavia Mozyr	2010	Belarusian First League	10	1	–		–		–		10	1
Slavia Mozyr	2011	Belarusian First League	27	4	1	0	–		–		28	4
Slavia Mozyr	2012	Belarusian Premier League	5	1	1	0	–		–		6	1
Slavia Mozyr	2013	Belarusian Premier League	23	9	2	3	–		–		25	12
Slavia Mozyr	2014	Belarusian First League	28	23	1	0	–		–		29	23
Slavia Mozyr	2015	Belarusian Premier League	13	9	–		–		–		13	9
Tosno	2015–16	Russian First League	14	1	3	0	–		–		17	1
Slavia Mozyr (loan)	2016	Belarusian Premier League	15	3	–		–		–		15	3
Slavia Mozyr (loan)	Total (2 spells)		121	50	5	3	0	0	0	0	126	53
Shakhtyor Soligorsk	2016	Belarusian Premier League	14	6	2	3	2 (Note: Appearances in the UEFA Europa League)	1	–		18	10
Shakhtyor Soligorsk	2017	Belarusian Premier League	29	10	7	3	2	0	–		38	13
Shakhtyor Soligorsk	2018	Belarusian Premier League	26	12	4	1	4	1	–		34	14
Shakhtyor Soligorsk	Total		69	28	13	7	8	2	0	0	90	37
Dinamo Brest	2019	Belarusian Premier League	29	12	1	0	–		1 (Note: Appearances in the Belarusian Super Cup)	1	31	13
Dinamo Brest	2020	Belarusian Premier League	26	11	7	2	0	0	1	0	34	13
Dinamo Brest	Total		55	23	8	2	0	0	2	1	65	26
Rukh Brest	2021	Belarusian Premier League	28	9	1	0	–		–		29	9
Torpedo Moscow	2021–22	Russian First League	13	5	–		–		–		13	5
Torpedo Moscow	2022–23	Russian Premier League	4	0	5	1	–		–		9	1
Torpedo Moscow	Total		17	5	5	1	0	0	0	0	22	6
Career total			319	122	35	13	8	2	2	1	364	138

=== International ===
As of match played 21 March 2024

Appearances and goals by national team and year
National team	Year	Apps	Goals
Belarus	2015	1	0
Belarus	2016	2	0
Belarus	2017	6	0
Belarus	2018	6	1
Belarus	2019	8	0
Belarus	2020	5	0
Belarus	2021	2	0
Belarus	2022	–	
Belarus	2023	2	1
Belarus	2024	1	0
Total		33	1

Scores and results list Belarus's goal tally first, score column indicates score after each Laptev goal.

List of international goals scored by Denis Laptev
No.	Date	Venue	Opponent	Score	Result	Competition
1	18 November 2023	Szusza Ferenc Stadion, Budapest, Hungary	Moldova	1–0	1–0	UEFA Euro 2024 qualification
