= Sergey Matveychik =

Belarusian footballer

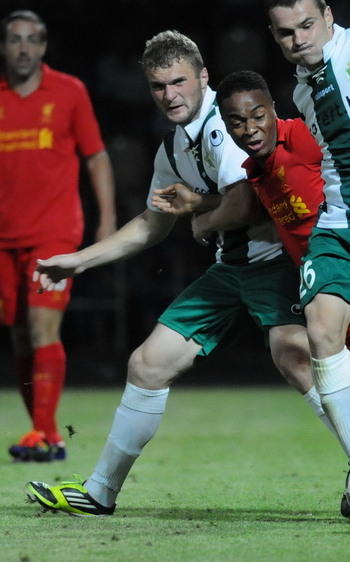

Personal information
- Full name: Sergey Sergeyevich Matveychik
- Date of birth: 5 June 1988 (age 38)
- Place of birth: Zhlobin, Gomel Oblast, Belarusian SSR
- Height: 1.76 m (5 ft 9 1/2 in)
- Position: Defender

Youth career
- 2005–2007: Gomel

Senior career*
Years	Team	Apps	(Gls)
2006–2012	Gomel	121	(3)
2013–2020	Shakhtyor Soligorsk	192	(1)
2020–2021	Dinamo Minsk	39	(0)
2022–2026	Gomel	72	(0)

International career
2009–2011	Belarus U21	19	(0)
2011	Belarus Olympic	3	(0)
2014–2020	Belarus	15	(0)
- * Club domestic league appearances and goals as of 21 November 2026

Sergey Sergeyevich Matveychik (Belarusian: Сяргей Сяргеевіч Мацвейчык; Russian: Сергей Сергеевич Матвейчик; born 5 June 1988) is a Belarusian former professional footballer.

== International career ==
Matveychik was part of the Belarus U21 that finished in 3rd place at the 2011 UEFA European Under-21 Football Championship. He played in two of the matches, receiving a red card in the game against Switzerland U21.

Matveychik made his debut for the senior national side of his country on 15 November 2014, in a match against Spain in a Euro 2016 qualifier, playing the full 90 minutes.

== Honours ==
Gomel

- Belarusian Cup winner: 2010–11, 2021–22
- Belarusian Super Cup winner: 2012

Shakhtyor Soligorsk

- Belarusian Premier League champion: 2020
- Belarusian Cup winner: 2013–14, 2018–19
