= Syarhey Nikifarenka =

Belarusian footballer and coach

Syarhey Nikiforenka
Personal information
- Date of birth: 18 February 1978 (age 48)
- Place of birth: Soligorsk, Belarusian SSR
- Height: 1.81 m (5 ft 11 in)
- Position: Forward

Team information
- Current team: Dinamo Brest (assistant coach)

Youth career
- 1994–1996: Shakhtyor Soligorsk

Senior career*
Years	Team	Apps	(Gls)
1994–1996	Shakhtyor Soligorsk	2	(0)
1997	Dinamo-93 Minsk	14	(1)
1997	AFViS-RShVSM Minsk	12	(5)
1998–2011	Shakhtyor Soligorsk	291	(87)

International career
2001	Belarus B	2	(0)

Managerial career
- 2015–2016: Shakhtyor Soligorsk
- 2017–2019: Shakhtyor Soligorsk (youth)
- 2019: Shakhtyor Soligorsk (caretaker)
- 2020–2021: Shakhtyor Petrikov
- 2022–: Belarus U17 (assistant)
- 2023–: Dinamo Brest (assistant)
- * Club domestic league appearances and goals

Syarhey Ivanavich Nikifarenka (Belarusian: Сяргей Нікіфарэнка; Russian: Серге́й Никифоренко; born 18 February 1978) is a Belarusian football coach and a former player.

== Career ==
He spent the majority of his career in Shakhtyor Soligorsk. He is Shakhtyor's all-time top scorer and was one of the most prolific scorers of Belarusian League in the late 1990s and 2000s. From 2015 till 2016 he worked as a Shakhtyor Soligorsk head coach.

== Honours ==
Shakhtyor Soligorsk

- Belarusian Premier League champion: 2005
- Belarusian Cup winner: 2003–04
