= Maksim Sanets =

Belarusian footballer

Personal information
- Date of birth: 4 April 1997 (age 29)
- Place of birth: Turov, Gomel Oblast, Belarus
- Height: 1.83 m (6 ft 0 in)
- Position: Midfielder

Team information
- Current team: Dnepr Rogachev
- Number: 11

Youth career
- 2012–2014: Gomel

Senior career*
Years	Team	Apps	(Gls)
2014–2015	Gomel	20	(1)
2016–2017	Krumkachy Minsk	19	(0)
2017–2019	Torpedo Minsk	15	(2)
2018–2019	→ Lokomotiv Gomel (loan)	28	(7)
2019–2020	Lokomotiv Gomel	14	(2)
2021	Sputnik Rechitsa	5	(1)
2021	Isloch Minsk Raion	8	(1)
2022	Slutsk	12	(2)
2023–2024	Bumprom Gomel	25	(8)
2024–	Dnepr Rogachev		

International career
2016–2017	Belarus U21	3	(0)
- * Club domestic league appearances and goals as of 17 July 2024

Maksim Sanets (Belarusian: Максім Санец; Russian: Максим Санец; born 4 April 1997) is a Belarusian professional footballer who plays for Dnepr Rogachev.
