= Vladislav Krivitsky =

Belarusian footballer (born 1995)

Personal information
- Date of birth: 3 July 1995 (age 31)
- Place of birth: Minsk, Belarus
- Height: 1.94 m (6 ft 4 1/2 in)
- Position: Defender

Youth career
- 2008–2015: Minsk

Senior career*
| Years | Team | Apps | (Gls) |
| 2015–2017 | Minsk | 0 | (0) |
| 2016 | → Torpedo Minsk (loan) | 11 | (0) |
| 2016 | → Granit Mikashevichi (loan) | 10 | (1) |
| 2018 | Energetik-BGU Minsk | 12 | (1) |
| 2020–2021 | Kyran | 29 | (1) |
| 2022 | Dinamo Brest | 9 | (0) |
- * Club domestic league appearances and goals as of 31 December 2022

Vladislav Krivitsky (Belarusian: Уладзіслаў Крывіцкі; Russian: Владислав Кривицкий; born 3 July 1995) is a Belarusian professional footballer.
