= Andrey Antanyuk =

Belarusian professional footballer

Personal information
- Date of birth: 17 March 1995 (age 31)
- Place of birth: Gomel, Belarus
- Height: 1.89 m (6 ft 2 1/2 in)
- Position: Forward

Team information
- Current team: Leskhoz Gomel

Youth career
- 2013–2015: Gomel

Senior career*
Years	Team	Apps	(Gls)
2015–2019	Gomel	24	(1)
2017	→ Granit Mikashevichi (loan)	12	(1)
2018	→ UAS Zhitkovichi (loan)	27	(3)
2021–	Leskhoz Gomel	49	(15)
- * Club domestic league appearances and goals as of 31 December 2023

Andrey Antanyuk (Belarusian: Андрэй Антанюк; Russian: Андрей Антанюк; born 17 March 1995) is a Belarusian professional footballer who plays for Leskhoz Gomel.
