= Dmitry Sviridenko =

Belarusian footballer

Personal information
- Date of birth: 20 August 1997 (age 29)
- Place of birth: Gomel, Belarus
- Height: 1.78 m (5 ft 10 in)
- Position: Midfielder

Youth career
- 2013–2015: Gomel

Senior career*
| Years | Team | Apps | (Gls) |
| 2015 | Gomel | 1 | (0) |
| 2016–2022 | Lokomotiv Gomel | 128 | (13) |
- * Club domestic league appearances and goals as of 31 December 2022

Dmitry Sviridenko (Belarusian: Дзмітры Свірыдзенка; Russian: Дмитрий Свириденко; born 20 August 1997) is a Belarusian professional footballer.
