= Olshany =

Agrotown in Brest Region, Belarus

Olshany Альшаны (Belarusian) Alshany
- Agrotown
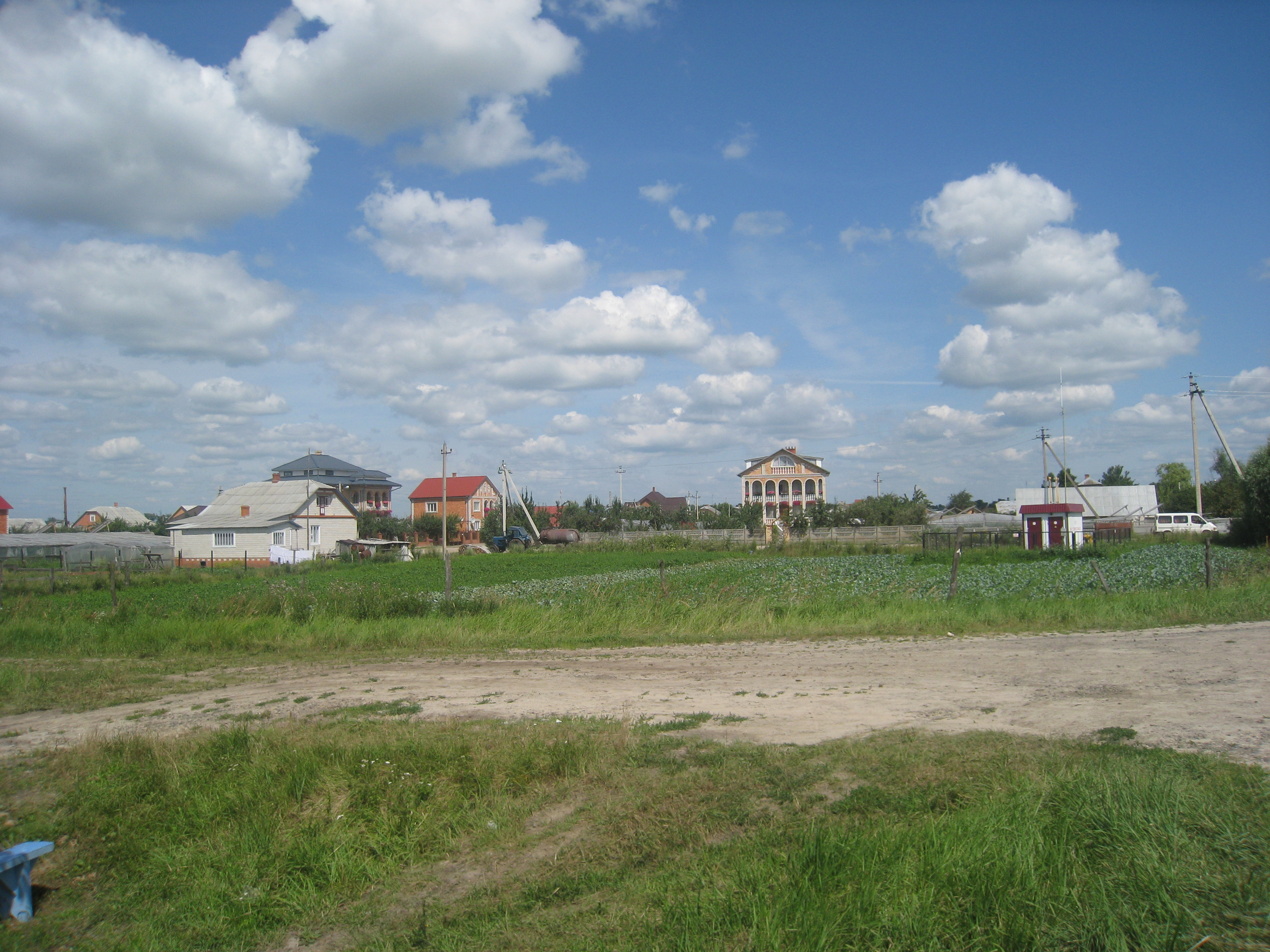

- Location within Belarus
- Coordinates: 52°04′35″N 27°20′49″E
- Country: Belarus
- Region: Brest Region
- District: Stolin District
- First mentioned: 1392
- Elevation: 127 m (417 ft)

Population (2010)
  - Total: 6,763
- Time zone: UTC+3 (MSK)
- Postal code: 225557

Olshany (Belarusian: Альшаны, romanized: Alshany; Russian: Ольшаны) is an agrotown in Stolin District, Brest Region, Belarus. It serves as the administrative center of Olshany rural council (selsoviet). It is first mentioned in 1392.

== History ==
In 2009, Olshany received the status of agrotown. In 2011, it officially became an agrotown.
