= Vladislav Zavadskiy =

Belarusian footballer

Personal information
- Date of birth: 4 February 1996 (age 30)
- Place of birth: Samokhvalovichi, Minsk Oblast, Belarus
- Height: 1.75 m (5 ft 9 in)
- Position: Midfielder

Team information
- Current team: Falko Cherkassy

Youth career
- 2015–2016: Gorodeya

Senior career*
Years	Team	Apps	(Gls)
2015–2019	Gorodeya	5	(0)
2017	→ Smolevichi-STI (loan)	25	(5)
2018	→ Slavia Mozyr (loan)	12	(1)
2020	Krumkachy Minsk	7	(0)
2020	Oshmyany	12	(0)
2021–	Falko Cherkassy	32	(55)
- * Club domestic league appearances and goals as of 31 December 2023

Vladislav Zavadskiy (Belarusian: Уладзіслаў Завадскі; Russian: Владислав Завадский; born 4 February 1996) is a Belarusian footballer who plays for Falko Cherkassy.
