= Yury Vyarheychyk =

Belarusian footballer and coach

Personal information
- Date of birth: 5 March 1968 (age 58)
- Height: 1.87 m (6 ft 1 1/2 in)
- Position: Forward

Youth career
- 1988–1991: Dinamo Minsk

Senior career*
Years	Team	Apps	(Gls)
1989–1991	Dinamo Minsk	1	(0)
1992–1995	Dinamo-93 Minsk	105	(37)
1995–1997	Molenbeek	50	(4)
1997–1999	LR Ahlen	33	(3)
1999–2000	Shakhtyor Soligorsk	20	(4)

International career
1994–1996	Belarus	7	(1)

Managerial career
- 2001: Shakhtyor Soligorsk (assistant)
- 2002–2009: Shakhtyor Soligorsk
- 2003: Belarus (assistant)
- 2010–2018: Shakhtyor Soligorsk (director)
- * Club domestic league appearances and goals

Yury Vyarheychyk (Belarusian: Юры Вяргейчык; Russian: Юрий Вергейчик; born 5 March 1968) is a Belarusian professional football coach and a former player. He is the father of Kiryl Vyarheychyk.

== Honours ==
=== Playing career ===
Dinamo-93 Minsk

- Belarusian Cup winner: 1994–95

=== Coaching career ===
Shakhtyor Soligorsk

- Belarusian Premier League champion: 2005
- Belarusian Cup winner: 2003–04
