= Dmitry Baiduk =

Belarusian professional footballer

Personal information
- Date of birth: 3 August 1996 (age 30)
- Place of birth: Churilovichi, Minsk Raion, Belarus
- Height: 1.80 m (5 ft 11 in)
- Position: Midfielder

Team information
- Current team: Mazur Pisz
- Number: 99

Youth career
- 2013–2015: BATE Borisov

Senior career*
Years	Team	Apps	(Gls)
2015–2016	BATE Borisov	0	(0)
2016	→ Smolevichi-STI (loan)	22	(0)
2017	Smolevichi-STI	26	(3)
2018	Belshina Bobruisk	27	(11)
2019–2020	Gorodeya	45	(1)
2021	Dinamo Brest	6	(0)
2022	Znicz Biała Piska	31	(4)
2023	Mamry Giżycko	21	(4)
2024–	Mazur Pisz	33	(18)

International career
2015–2016	Belarus U21	4	(0)
- * Club domestic league appearances and goals as of 16:39, 22 June 2025 (UTC)

Dmitry Baiduk (Belarusian: Дзмітрый Байдук; Russian: Дмитрий Байдук; born 3 August 1996) is a Belarusian professional footballer who plays as a midfielder for Polish club Mazur Pisz.
