= Albert Kapsky =

Belarusian footballer

Personal information
- Date of birth: 18 January 1997 (age 29)
- Place of birth: Minsk, Belarus
- Height: 1.82 m (5 ft 11 1/2 in)
- Position: Defender

Youth career
- 2013–2017: Minsk

Senior career*
Years	Team	Apps	(Gls)
2017	Minsk	2	(0)
2017	→ Luch Minsk (loan)	9	(0)
2018	Smorgon	13	(0)
2018	Naftan Novopolotsk	13	(0)
2019	Smorgon	14	(0)
2019–2020	Arsenal Dzerzhinsk	34	(1)
2021	Volna Pinsk	29	(2)

International career
2015	Belarus U19	1	(0)
- * Club domestic league appearances and goals as of 31 December 2021

Albert Kapsky (Belarusian: Альберт Капскі; Russian: Альберт Капский; born 18 January 1997) is a Belarusian professional footballer.
