= Ihar Burko =

Belarusian footballer

Personal information
- Date of birth: 8 September 1988 (age 38)
- Place of birth: Berezino, Minsk Oblast, Belarusian SSR
- Height: 1.76 m (5 ft 9 1/2 in)
- Position: Defender

Senior career*
Years	Team	Apps	(Gls)
2010	Vigvam Smolevichi	15	(0)
2010–2013	Dinamo Brest	72	(3)
2014–2015	Torpedo-BelAZ Zhodino	53	(4)
2016–2020	Shakhtyor Soligorsk	113	(9)
2021–2025	Torpedo-BelAZ Zhodino	90	(1)
2024	→ Torpedo-BelAZ-2 Zhodino	2	(0)

International career^{‡}
2017–2020	Belarus	6	(0)
- * Club domestic league appearances and goals as of 3 April 2026 ‡ National team caps and goals as of 26 February 2020

Ihar Burko (Belarusian: Ігар Бурко; Russian: Игорь Бурко; born 8 September 1988) is a Belarusian former professional footballer who last played for Torpedo-BelAZ Zhodino.

== International career ==
Burko was called up to the senior Belarus squad for a UEFA Euro 2016 qualifier against Macedonia in October 2015.

== Honours ==
Torpedo-BelAZ Zhodino

- Belarusian Cup winner: 2015–16

Shakhtyor Soligorsk

- Belarusian Premier League champion: 2020
- Belarusian Cup winner: 2018–19
