= Pavel Lyakhnovich =

Belarusian footballer

Personal information
- Date of birth: 7 January 1997 (age 29)
- Place of birth: Plyeshchanitsy, Lahoysk Raion, Minsk Oblast, Belarus
- Height: 1.81 m (5 ft 11 1/2 in)
- Position: Midfielder

Team information
- Current team: Osipovichi
- Number: 15

Youth career
- 2014–2016: BATE Borisov

Senior career*
Years	Team	Apps	(Gls)
2015–2016	BATE Borisov	0	(0)
2016	Smolevichi-STI	1	(0)
2017	Luch Minsk	3	(1)
2017	Krumkachy Minsk	1	(0)
2018	Chist	14	(0)
2018	Smorgon	13	(0)
2019	Uzda	13	(0)
2019–2020	Oshmyany	16	(0)
2020	Viktoriya Maryina Gorka	9	(1)
2021	Smolevichi	15	(4)
2022–	Osipovichi	23	(1)
- * Club domestic league appearances and goals as of 31 December 2022

Pavel Lyakhnovich (Belarusian: Павел Ляхновіч; Russian: Павел Ляхнович; born 7 January 1997) is a Belarusian professional footballer who plays for Osipovichi.
