= Uladzimir Khvashchynski =

Belarusian footballer

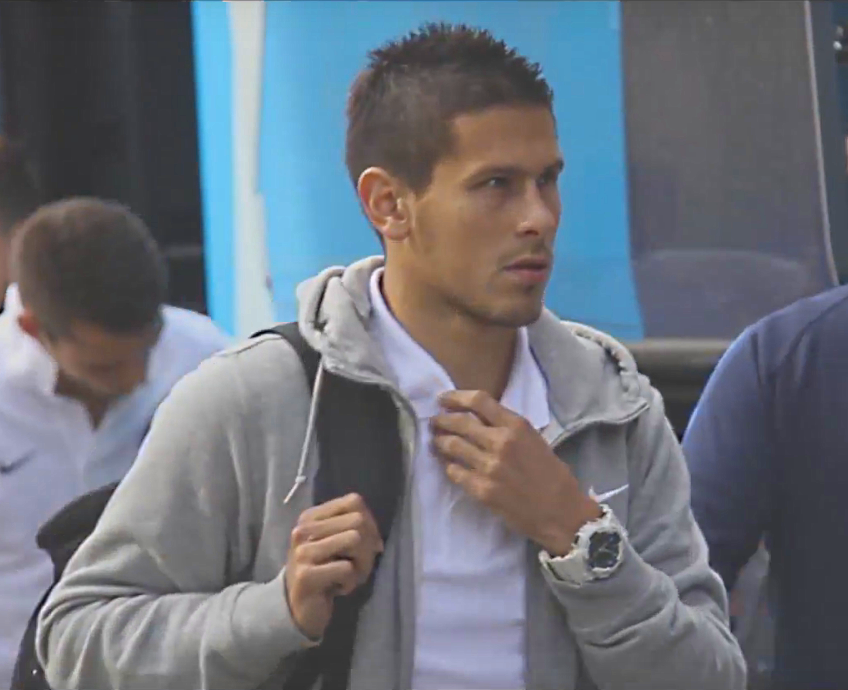
- Khvashchynski in 2016

Personal information
- Date of birth: 10 May 1990 (age 36)
- Place of birth: Bobruisk, Mogilev Oblast, Byelorussian SSR, Soviet Union
- Height: 1.73 m (5 ft 8 in)
- Position: Forward

Team information
- Current team: Isloch Minsk Raion
- Number: 10

Youth career
- 2006–2008: Dinamo Brest

Senior career*
Years	Team	Apps	(Gls)
2008–2012	Dinamo Brest	90	(17)
2013–2014	Dinamo Minsk	30	(3)
2014	→ Minsk (loan)	16	(6)
2015	Minsk	25	(10)
2016–2018	Dinamo Minsk	76	(23)
2019–2020	Shakhtyor Soligorsk	12	(1)
2020	→ Minsk (loan)	13	(5)
2020–2021	Dinamo Minsk	17	(4)
2021	→ Caspiy (loan)	7	(0)
2022	Minsk	27	(20)
2023–2024	Dinamo Minsk	36	(8)
2025–	Isloch Minsk Raion	42	(4)

International career^{‡}
	Belarus U19	1	(0)
2010–2012	Belarus U21	8	(0)
2011–2012	Belarus Olympic	6	(1)
2012–2023	Belarus	8	(1)
- * Club domestic league appearances and goals as of 3 July 2026 ‡ National team caps and goals as of 28 March 2023

Uladzimir Khvashchynski (Belarusian: Уладзімір Хвашчынскі; Russian: Владимир Хващинский; born 10 May 1990) is a Belarusian professional footballer who plays as a forward for Isloch Minsk Raion. He has represented the Belarus national team since 2012.

== International career ==
Khvashchynski was a member of the Belarus U21 that finished in 3rd place at the 2011 UEFA European Under-21 Football Championship. He appeared as a substitute in two of the matches. He also represented the Belarus Olympic team that participated in the 2012 Toulon Tournament and was also part of the 2012 Summer Olympics squad, though he remained an unused substitute. He made his debut for the senior national team of his country on 14 November 2012, in the 2–1 away win over Israel in a friendly match.

== Career statistics ==
Scores and results list Belarus' goal tally first.

#	Date	Venue	Opponent	Score	Result	Competition
1.	25 March 2013	Khalifa International Stadium, Doha, Qatar	Canada	2–0	2–0	Friendly

== Honours ==
Shakhtyor Soligorsk

- Belarusian Cup: 2018–19
