= Vitaly Sevostyanik =

Belarusian football referee (born 1980)

Vitaly Sevostyanik (Russian: Виталий Севостьяник, Belarusian: Віталь Севасцьянік; born 1 August 1980 in Grodno) is a Belarusian professional football referee. He has officiated matches of the Belarusian Premier League since 2007.

Sevostyanik was on a FIFA International Referees List between 2009 and 2012.
