= Mikalay Yanush =

Belarusian footballer

Personal information
- Date of birth: 9 September 1984 (age 42)
- Place of birth: Mikashevichy, Brest Oblast, Belarusian SSR
- Height: 1.82 m (5 ft 11 1/2 in)
- Position: Forward

Team information
- Current team: Partizan Soligorsk (head coach)

Senior career*
Years	Team	Apps	(Gls)
2001–2009	Granit Mikashevichi	213	(46)
2010–2011	Dinamo Brest	35	(10)
2012–2019	Shakhtyor Soligorsk	180	(71)
2018	→ Neman Grodno (loan)	28	(4)
2020	Isloch Minsk Raion	20	(9)
2022	Partizan Soligorsk	6	(2)
Total		482	(142)

International career
2015–2016	Belarus	4	(0)

Managerial career
- 2021–: Partizan Soligorsk
- * Club domestic league appearances and goals as of 31 December 2022

Mikalay Yanush (Belarusian: Мікалай Януш; Russian: Николай Януш; born 9 September 1984) is a Belarusian professional football coach and former player.

== Career ==
He was a Belarusian Premier League top scorer in 2014 and 2015.

Yanush made his debut for the senior national side of his country on 30 March 2015 in a friendly match against Gabon.

== Honours ==
Shakhtyor Soligorsk

- Belarusian Cup winner: 2013–14, 2018–19
