= 2015 Belarusian Premier League =

Belarusian Premier League
- Season: 2015
- Champions: BATE Borisov
- Champions League: BATE Borisov
- Europa League: Dinamo Minsk; Shakhtyor Soligorsk
- Matches: 182
- Goals: 436 (2.4 per match)
- Top goalscorer: Mikalay Yanush (15)
- Biggest home win: BATE 7–1 Neman (22 August 2015)
- Biggest away win: Slavia 1–6 Slutsk (3 October 2015)
- Highest scoring: Slavia 3–5 BATE (10 July 2015); BATE 7–1 Neman (22 August 2015)
- Longest winning run: BATE (7), Dinamo Minsk (7), Minsk (7)
- Longest unbeaten run: BATE (14)
- Longest winless run: Gomel (12)
- Longest losing run: Naftan (6); Gomel (6); Dinamo Brest (6)

The 2015 Belarusian Premier League was the 25th season of top-tier football in Belarus. It began on 10 April 2015 and ended on 8 November 2015. BATE Borisov were the defending champions, having won their 11th league title last year, and secured a 12th.

== Format ==
Following the league expansion from 12 to 14 clubs, the league format returned to a regular double-round robin tournament with no second phase. Only one lowest-placed team was relegated and replaced by three best teams of First League, to expand the top level to 16 teams for 2016.

== Teams ==
Locations of teams in the 2015 Belarusian Premier League

Two best teams of 2014 First League (Granit Mikashevichi and Slavia Mozyr) were promoted to the league, which was expanded from 12 to 14 clubs.

The last-placed team of 2014 Premier League (Dnepr Mogilev) were relegated after they lost relegation/promotion playoffs against First League third-placed team Vitebsk (who were promoted to replace Dnepr).

Team	Location	Venue	Capacity	Position in 2014
BATE	Borisov	Borisov Arena	13,126	1
Belshina	Bobruisk	Spartak Stadium	3,700	10
Dinamo Brest	Brest	OSK Brestskiy	10,162	11
Dinamo Minsk	Minsk	Traktor Stadium	17,600	2
Gomel	Gomel	Central Stadium	14,307	6
Granit	Mikashevichi	Polesye Stadium (Luninets)	3,090	First League, 1
Minsk	Minsk	FC Minsk Stadium	3,000	7
Naftan	Novopolotsk	Atlant Stadium	4,500	5
Neman	Grodno	Neman Stadium	8,479	8
Shakhtyor	Soligorsk	Stroitel Stadium	4,200	3
Slavia	Mozyr	Yunost Stadium	5,353	First League, 2
Slutsk	Slutsk	City Stadium (Slutsk)	1,896	9
Torpedo-BelAZ	Zhodino	Torpedo Stadium (Zhodino)	6,524	4
Vitebsk	Vitebsk	Vitebsky CSK	8,144	First League, 3

1. One game played at City Stadium in Borisov.
2. Two games played at Torpedo Stadium and two games at Traktor Stadium (both in Minsk).

== League table ==
Pos	Team	Pld	W	D	L	GF	GA	GD	Pts	Qualification or relegation
1	BATE Borisov (C)	26	20	5	1	44	11	+33	65	Qualification for the Champions League second qualifying round
2	Dinamo Minsk	26	15	8	3	36	13	+23	53	Qualification for the Europa League first qualifying round
3	Shakhtyor Soligorsk	26	14	7	5	47	27	+20	49	Qualification for the Europa League first qualifying round
4	Belshina Bobruisk	26	12	7	7	39	19	+20	43	
5	Granit Mikashevichi	26	12	6	8	30	32	−2	42	
6	Minsk	26	12	4	10	29	28	+1	40	
7	Torpedo-BelAZ Zhodino	26	10	6	10	31	29	+2	36	Qualification for the Europa League second qualifying round (Note: Torpedo-BelAZ Zhodino qualified for the Europa League second qualifying round by winning the 2015–16 Belarusian Cup.)
8	Neman Grodno	26	8	8	10	21	32	−11	32	
9	Naftan Novopolotsk	26	8	6	12	34	35	−1	30	
10	Slavia Mozyr	26	7	5	14	33	50	−17	26	
11	Slutsk	26	6	7	13	26	30	−4	25	
12	Dinamo Brest	26	7	3	16	23	42	−19	24	
13	Vitebsk	26	4	9	13	21	47	−26	21	
14	Gomel (R)	26	5	3	18	22	41	−19	18	Relegation to the Belarusian First League

Source: football.by, Soccerway
Rules for classification: 1) Points; 2) Head-to-head points; 3) Head-to-head matches won; 4) Head-to-head goal difference; 5) Head-to-head goals scored; 6) Goal difference; 7) Matches won; 8) Goals scored; 9) Draw.
(C) Champions; (R) Relegated

== Results ==
Each team will play twice against every other team for a total of 26 matches.

Home \ Away	BAT	BSH	DBR	DMI	GOM	GRA	MIN	NAF	NEM	SHA	SLA	SLU	TZH	VIT
BATE Borisov		1–0	1–0	0–1	2–0	1–1	1–0	2–1	7–1	1–1	1–0	4–1	1–0	4–0
Belshina Bobruisk	0–1		2–0	0–2	3–1	0–1	4–0	1–1	0–0	3–1	2–0	2–0	1–0	1–1
Dinamo Brest	0–1	2–1		1–0	0–4	0–0	1–0	0–1	1–3	3–2	1–2	1–1	2–1	3–2
Dinamo Minsk	0–2	0–0	4–1		1–0	1–0	1–1	2–1	2–0	1–0	2–0	2–0	4–0	0–0
Gomel	0–0	2–0	2–0	1–2		1–2	3–0	1–4	0–0	1–3	0–2	1–3	0–2	2–0
Granit Mikashevichi	0–1	1–5	1–0	0–0	1–0		2–0	3–0	0–1	2–3	3–2	1–0	2–1	1–1
Minsk	1–2	2–1	2–1	0–3	1–0	5–0		0–0	2–0	1–0	2–1	2–0	0–2	3–2
Naftan Novopolotsk	1–2	0–2	1–0	2–2	3–1	0–0	0–1		1–2	3–4	1–1	0–1	0–2	3–0
Neman Grodno	0–1	1–3	2–1	1–1	1–0	2–0	1–1	3–1		0–1	3–1	0–4	0–1	0–1
Shakhtyor Soligorsk	0–0	0–0	2–1	0–0	4–1	1–1	1–0	1–0	3–0		6–1	2–0	3–1	4–1
Slavia Mozyr	3–5	1–4	3–0	2–4	3–1	2–0	0–0	0–3	0–0	1–1		1–6	1–2	4–0
Slutsk	0–1	0–0	1–1	0–1	0–0	1–2	0–1	0–1	0–0	0–2	3–1		1–1	4–2
Torpedo-BelAZ Zhodino	0–0	0–3	1–3	1–0	3–0	2–3	2–0	3–3	0–0	3–0	0–1	0–0		3–1
Vitebsk	0–2	1–1	2–0	0–0	1–0	2–3	0–4	1–3	0–0	2–2	0–0	1–0	0–0	

Source: football.by
Legend: Blue = home team win; Yellow = draw; Red = away team win.

== Top goalscorers ==
Rank	Goalscorer	Team	Goals
1	(Belarus) Mikalay Yanush	Shakhtyor Soligorsk	15
2	(Belarus) Uladzimir Khvashchynski	Minsk	10
2	(Bulgaria) Chigozie Udoji	Dinamo Minsk	10
4	(Belarus) Denis Laptev	Slavia Mozyr	9
4	(Belarus) Vitali Rodionov	BATE Borisov	9
4	(Montenegro) Fatos Bećiraj	Dinamo Minsk	9
4	(Belarus) Vadzim Dzemidovich	Naftan Novopolotsk / Torpedo Zhodino	9
8	(Belarus) Raman Vasilyuk	Dinamo Brest	8
8	(Ukraine) Serhiy Rozhok	Belshina Bobruisk	8
8	(Belarus) Roman Volkov	Naftan Novopolotsk	8
8	(Belarus) Yahor Zubovich	Slutsk	8

Updated to games played on 8 November 2015
Source: football.by

== See also ==
- 2015 Belarusian First League
- 2014–15 Belarusian Cup
- 2015–16 Belarusian Cup
