= FC Minsk Stadium =

Stadium in Belarus

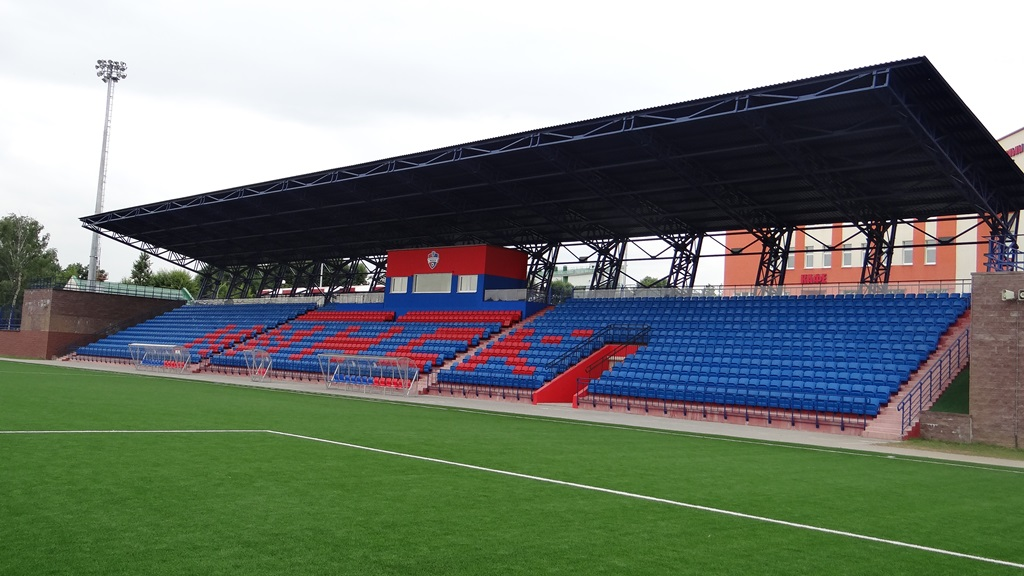
- Interactive map of FC Minsk Stadium
- Location: Minsk, Belarus
- Coordinates: 53°51′42″N 27°34′43″E
- Capacity: 3,000
- Surface: Artificial grass

Construction
- Built: 2012–2015
- Opened: 2015

Tenants
- FC Minsk; FC Minsk (women); FC Isloch Minsk Raion

FC Minsk Stadium is a football stadium in Minsk, Belarus. It is a home ground of FC Minsk. The stadium holds 3,000 people.

== History ==
The stadium was built at the same location as former Kamvolschik Stadium, which was most recently used for lower leagues, youth and reserve teams matches. By mid-2000s it had been largely abandoned and was slowly decaying. In the past, the stadium was used for Belarusian SSR league games and as an occasional substitute pitch for Belarusian Premier League and Belarusian Cup games by various clubs.

== Modern use ==
In 2011 Kamvolschik Stadium was demolished. The new FC Minsk Stadium was built between 2012 and 2015 and opened in May 2015. Since then it was used primarily as a home venue by FC Minsk, as well as their women's team. Additionally, the stadium hosted FC Minsk women's team UEFA Women's Champions League home matches as well as UEFA Youth League matches by FC Minsk youth squad.
