= Belarusian Super Cup =

- Founded: 2010; 16 years ago
- Region: Belarus
- Teams: 2
- Current champions: FC Dinamo Minsk (1st title)
- Most championships: BATE Borisov (8 titles)
- Website: abff.by
- 2025 Belarusian Super Cup

The Belarusian Super Cup (Belarusian: Суперкубак Беларусі, romanized: Superkubak Belarusi) is an annual one-match association football competition in Belarus organized by the Football Federation of Belarus. This competition serves as the season opener and is played between the Belarusian Premier League Champions and the Belarusian Cup Winners of the previous season. If a single team holds both titles, the Cup runners-up are invited. The match usually played in late February or early March each year.

== History ==
The predecessor to Belarusian Super Cup - the semi-official competition named Season Cup was contested in July 1994 between then-current champions and Cup holders Dinamo Minsk and Cup runners-up Fandok Bobruisk. Dinamo won the match 5–3. The tournament was scrapped after just one edition.

The official Belarusian Super Cup competition was introduced in 2010 and is held every year since. Due to climate restrictions, it is usually played in enclosed Football Manege in Minsk.

== Matches ==
Year	Winners	Score	Runners-up	Venue	Attendance
2010	BATE Borisov	0–0 (3–2 pen.)	Naftan Novopolotsk	Football Manege, Minsk	1,500
2011	BATE Borisov	3–0	Torpedo-BelAZ Zhodino	Football Manege, Minsk	1,600
2012	Gomel	2–0	BATE Borisov	Football Manege, Minsk	1,700
2013	BATE Borisov	1–0	Naftan Novopolotsk	Football Manege, Minsk	1,600
2014	BATE Borisov	1–0	Minsk	Football Manege, Minsk	1,650
2015	BATE Borisov	0–0 (3–0 pen.)	Shakhtyor Soligorsk	Volna Stadium, Pinsk	3,100
2016	BATE Borisov	2–1	Shakhtyor Soligorsk	FC Minsk Stadium, Minsk	3,000
2017	BATE Borisov	3–1	Torpedo-BelAZ Zhodino	FC Minsk Stadium, Minsk	2,550
2018	Dynamo Brest	2–1	BATE Borisov	FC Minsk Stadium, Minsk	3,000
2019	Dynamo Brest	3–1	BATE Borisov	FC Minsk Stadium, Minsk	3,000
2020	Dynamo Brest	2–0	Shakhtyor Soligorsk	FC Minsk Stadium, Minsk	3,000
2021	Shakhtyor Soligorsk	0–0 (5–4 pen.)	BATE Borisov	FC Minsk Stadium, Minsk	1,500
2022	BATE Borisov	1–0	Shakhtyor Soligorsk	Dinamo-Yuni Stadium, Minsk	2,591
2023	Shakhtyor Soligorsk	1–0	Gomel	Dinamo-Yuni Stadium, Minsk	2,950
2024	Torpedo-BelAZ Zhodino	0–0 (4–3 pen.)	Dinamo Minsk	Shakhtyor Stadium, Soligorsk	1,911
2025	Dinamo Minsk	2–0	Neman Grodno	FC Minsk Stadium, Minsk	2,711

== Performance by club ==
Club	Wins	Runners-up	Winning years	Runners-up years
BATE Borisov	8	4	2010, 2011, 2013, 2014, 2015, 2016, 2017, 2022	2012, 2018, 2019, 2021
Dynamo Brest	3	0	2018, 2019, 2020	
Shakhtyor Soligorsk	2	4	2021, 2023	2015, 2016, 2020, 2022
Dinamo Minsk	2	1	1994*, 2025	2024
Torpedo-BelAZ Zhodino	1	2	2024	2011, 2017
Gomel	1	1	2012	2023
Naftan Novopolotsk	0	2		2010, 2013
Minsk	0	1		2014
Neman Grodno	1	1	2026	2025
