= FC Shakhtyor Soligorsk =

Shakhtyor Soligorsk
- Full name: Football Club Shakhtyor Soligorsk
- Nicknames: The Miners, The Moles
- Founded: 1961; 65 years ago
- Dissolved: March 2025; 16 months ago
- Ground: Stroitel Stadium; Soligorsk, Belarus
- Capacity: 4,200
- Director: Aleksandr Marchenko
- Manager: Ihar Harelaw
- League: Belarusian First League
- 2024: Belarusian Premier League, 16th of 16 (relegated)
- Website: fcshakhter.by
Home colours	Away colours

FC Shakhtyor Soligorsk (Belarusian: ФК Шахцёр Салігорск, romanized: FK Shakhtsyor Salihorsk, Russian: ФК Шахтёр Солигорск) was a Belarusian football club, playing in the city of Salihorsk (Soligorsk).

== History ==
The club was founded in 1961. During Soviet era, Shakhtyor Soligorsk played in the top or second division of the Belarusian SSR league, occasionally dropping to lower tiers (Minsk Oblast league) for a short time. In 1971, Shakhtyor absorbed two other local Soligorsk teams (Khimik and Gornyak). Their best results came toward the end of Soviet days, when the team finished as league runners-up twice (1988, 1990) and won the Belarusian SSR Cup three times (1985, 1986, 1988).

Since 1992, Shakhtyor has been playing in Belarusian Premier League. The team struggled through the 1990s, usually fighting against relegation. In 1997, they finished at the last place in the league, but were saved from relegation after two other Premier League clubs withdrew.

After a transitory 1998 season, they never finished below 6th place and became a staple European Cups participant from 1999 to 2022. Shakhtyor Soligorsk became the champions of Belarus in 2005, 2020 and 2021, and were league runners-up six times (2010, 2011, 2012, 2013, 2016, 2018). They also won the Belarusian Cup three times (2004, 2014, and 2019).

On May 11, 2023, following a match-fixing scandal, the club was stripped of the 2022 league title and received a 30-point deduction for the following campaign, as well as an additional 20-point deduction the campaign afterwards.

At the end of the 2024 season, after finishing in last place, they were relegated for the first time in the Belarusian championship.

In March 2025, the club failed to submit documents for licensing to participate in the First League. The club was later disbanded due to non-payment of debts.

== Honours ==
- Belarusian Premier League
  - Winners (3): 2005, 2020, 2021
  - Runners-up (6): 2010, 2011, 2012, 2013, 2016, 2018
- Belarusian Cup
  - Winners (3): 2003–04, 2013–14, 2018–19
  - Runners-up (5): 2005–06, 2007–08, 2008–09, 2014–15, 2016–17
- Belarusian Super Cup
  - Winners (2): 2021, 2023
  - Runners-up (4): 2015, 2016, 2020, 2022

== Current squad ==
As of March 2024

Note: Flags indicate national team as defined under FIFA eligibility rules; some limited exceptions apply. Players may hold more than one non-FIFA nationality.

No.	Pos.	Nation	Player
7	FW	BLR	Nikita Shaula
91	FW	BLR	Mark Bulanov
94	DF	BLR	Nikita Korshun
—	GK	BLR	Rustam Gurinovich
—	MF	BLR	Bogdan Kutsiy

== League and Cup history ==
Season	League									Belarusian Cup	Top goalscorer		Manager
Season	Div.	Pos.	Pl.	W	D	L	GS	GA	P	Belarusian Cup	Name	League	Manager
1992	1st	11th	15	5	3	7	15	17	13	Round of 16	(Belarus) Vladimir Kavalenya	6	(Belarus) Nikolai Kostyukevich
1992–93	1st	11th	32	8	10	14	19	34	26	Round of 32			(Belarus) Nikolai Kostyukevich
1993–94	1st	13th	30	5	11	14	21	39	21	Quarter-finals			(Belarus) Nikolai Kostyukevich (Belarus) Nikolay Gurchenkov (Belarus) Ivan Tupolskiy
1994–95	1st	14th	30	5	10	15	22	41	20	Round of 32			(Belarus) Ivan Tupolskiy (Belarus) Nikolai Kostyukevich
1995	1st	13th	15	4	4	7	12	20	16	Quarter-finals			(Belarus) Nikolai Kostyukevich (Kazakhstan) Gennadiy Plotnikov
1996	1st	11th	30	8	5	17	29	50	29	Quarter-finals			(Russia) Konstantin Afanasjev
1997	1st	16th^{1}	30	6	6	18	22	53	24	Round of 32			(Russia) Konstantin Afanasjev (Belarus) Ivan Schyokin
1998	1st	11th	28	8	6	14	33	54	30	Round of 32			(Belarus) Ivan Schyokin
1999	1st	5th	30	18	5	7	58	30	59	Round of 16	(Belarus) Dmitry Podrez	13	(Belarus) Ivan Schyokin
2000	1st	5th	30	15	9	6	47	29	54	Round of 32			(Belarus) Nikolai Kostyukevich
2001	1st	5th	26	13	7	6	43	24	46	Quarter-finals	(Belarus) Syarhey Nikifarenka	11	(Belarus) Nikolai Kostyukevich
2002	1st	3rd	26	15	6	5	41	23	51	Semifinal	(Belarus) Syarhey Nikifarenka	12	(Belarus) Nikolai Kostyukevich (Belarus) Yury Vyarheychyk
2003	1st	5th	30	19	7	4	60	23	64	Round of 16	(Belarus) Anatoly Tikhonchik	17	(Belarus) Nikolai Kostyukevich (Belarus) Yury Vyarheychyk
2004	1st	3rd	30	19	8	3	55	21	65	Winners	(Belarus) Artsyom Hancharyk	14	(Belarus) Yury Vyarheychyk
2005	1st	1st	26	19	6	1	59	14	63	Round of 16	(Belarus) Alyaksandr Klimenka	14	(Belarus) Yury Vyarheychyk
2006	1st	3rd	26	16	3	7	50	31	51	Runners Up	(Belarus) Alyaksandr Klimenka	17	(Belarus) Yury Vyarheychyk
2007	1st	3rd	26	12	8	6	41	27	44	Quarter-finals	(Belarus) Syarhey Nikifarenka	9	(Belarus) Yury Vyarheychyk
2008	1st	4th	30	15	6	9	50	35	51	Runners Up			(Belarus) Yury Vyarheychyk
2009	1st	6th	26	10	8	8	33	28	38	Runners Up			(Belarus) Yury Vyarheychyk (Belarus) Anatoly Bogovik (Belarus) Aleksey Vergeyenko
2010	1st	2nd	33	19	9	5	51	23	66	Semifinal	(Belarus) Pavel Sitko	9	(Russia) Eduard Malofeyev (Belarus) Uladzimir Zhuravel
2011	1st	2nd	33	17	10	6	46	24	61	Semifinal	(Russia) Aleksandr Alumona	9	(Belarus) Uladzimir Zhuravel
2012	1st	2nd	30	18	7	5	59	24	61	Round of 16	(Belarus) Dzmitry Asipenka	14	(Belarus) Uladzimir Zhuravel
2013	1st	2nd	32	17	7	8	44	26	58	Quarter-finals	(Belarus) Dzmitry Asipenka	11	(Belarus) Uladzimir Zhuravel
2014	1st	3rd	32	14	8	10	35	28	50	Winners	(Belarus) Mikalay Yanush	15	(Belarus) Sergei Borovsky
2015	1st	3rd	26	14	7	5	47	27	49	Runners Up	(Belarus) Mikalay Yanush	15	(Belarus) Sergei Borovsky (Belarus) Syarhey Nikifarenka
2016	1st	2nd	30	17	8	5	46	20	59	Quarter-finals	(Belarus) Mikalay Yanush	12	(Belarus) Syarhey Nikifarenka
2017	1st	3rd	30	20	5	5	52	22	65	Runners Up	(Belarus) Denis Laptev	10	(Belarus) Oleg Kubarev (Poland) Marek Zub
2018	1st	2nd	30	19	7	4	45	14	64	Quarter-finals	(Belarus) Denis Laptev	12	(Poland) Marek Zub (Russia) Sergei Tashuyev
2019	1st	3rd	30	20	5	5	59	21	65	Winners	(Belarus) Mikalay Yanush	11	(Russia) Sergei Tashuyev (Belarus) Syarhey Nikifarenka
2020	1st	1st	30	17	8	5	57	21	59	Semifinal	(Belarus) Vitaly Lisakovich	9	(Ukraine) Yuriy Vernydub (Ukraine) Roman Hryhorchuk
2021	1st	1st	30	24	3	3	62	18	75	Semifinal	(The Gambia) Dembo Darboe	19	(Ukraine) Roman Hryhorchuk (Belarus) Sergei Gurenko (Belarus) Aleksey Baga
2022	1st	1st^{2}	30	20	5	5	55	17	65	Round of 16	(Belarus) Maksim Skavysh	9	(Belarus) Ivan Bionchik (Russia) Sergei Tashuyev (Serbia) Milic Curcic
2023	1st	13th	28	13	5	10	50	40	9^{3}	Quarter-finals	(Belarus) Egor Karpitskiy	12	(Belarus) Stanislav Suvorov
2024	1st	16th	30	5	7	18	19	45	2^{4}	Round of 32	(Belarus) Denis Kovalevich	5	(Russia) Sergei Podpaly

- ^{1} Finished last but saved from relegation due to withdrawal of two higher-placed teams.
- ^{2} The title was stripped to Shakhtyor Soligorsk following a match-fixing scandal.
- ^{3} Shakhtyor Soligorsk were deducted 35 points for match-fixing.
- ^{4} Shakhtyor Soligorsk were deducted 20 points for match-fixing.

== Shakhtyor in Europe ==
As of 11 August 2022

Season	Competition	Round		Club	1st Leg	2nd Leg
2001–02	UEFA Cup	QR	(Bulgaria)	CSKA Sofia	1–2 (H)	1–3 (A)
2003	UEFA Intertoto Cup	1R	(Northern Ireland)	Omagh Town	1–0 (H)	7–1 (A)
2003	UEFA Intertoto Cup	2R	(Croatia)	Cibalia	1–1 (H)	2–4 (A)
2004–05	UEFA Cup	1Q	(Moldova)	Nistru Otaci	1–1 (A)	1–2 (H)
2006–07	UEFA Champions League	1Q	(Bosnia and Herzegovina)	Široki Brijeg	0–1 (H)	0–1 (A)
2007	UEFA Intertoto Cup	1R	(Armenia)	Ararat Yerevan	4–1 (H)	0–2 (A)
2007	UEFA Intertoto Cup	2R	(Ukraine)	Chornomorets Odesa	2–4 (A)	0–2 (H)
2008	UEFA Intertoto Cup	1R	(Poland)	Cracovia	2–1 (A)	3–0 (H)
2008	UEFA Intertoto Cup	2R	(Austria)	Sturm Graz	0–2 (A)	0–0 (H)
2011–12	UEFA Europa League	2Q	(Latvia)	Ventspils	0–1 (H)	2–3 (A)
2012–13	UEFA Europa League	2Q	(Austria)	Ried	1–1 (H)	0–0 (A)
2013–14	UEFA Europa League	2Q	(Moldova)	Milsami Orhei	1–1 (H)	1–1 (p. 2–4) (A)
2014–15	UEFA Europa League	2Q	(Republic of Ireland)	Derry City	1–0 (A)	5–1 (H)
2014–15	UEFA Europa League	3Q	(Belgium)	Zulte Waregem	5–2 (A)	2–2 (H)
2014–15	UEFA Europa League	PO	(Netherlands)	PSV Eindhoven	0–1 (A)	0–2 (H)
2015–16	UEFA Europa League	1Q	(Northern Ireland)	Glenavon	2–1 (A)	3–0 (H)
2015–16	UEFA Europa League	2Q	(Austria)	Wolfsberger AC	0–1 (H)	0–2 (A)
2016–17	UEFA Europa League	1Q	(Faroe Islands)	NSÍ Runavík	2–0 (A)	5–0 (H)
2016–17	UEFA Europa League	2Q	(Slovenia)	Domžale	1–1 (H)	1–2 (A)
2017–18	UEFA Europa League	1Q	(Lithuania)	Sūduva Marijampolė	0–0 (H)	1–2 (A)
2018–19	UEFA Europa League	1Q	(Wales)	Connah's Quay Nomads	3–1 (A)	2–0 (H)
2018–19	UEFA Europa League	2Q	(Poland)	Lech Poznań	1–1 (H)	1–3 (a.e.t.) (A)
2019–20	UEFA Europa League	1Q	(Malta)	Hibernians	1–0 (H)	1–0 (A)
2019–20	UEFA Europa League	2Q	(Denmark)	Esbjerg	2–0 (H)	0–0 (A)
2019–20	UEFA Europa League	3Q	(Italy)	Torino	0–5 (A)	1–1 (H)
2020–21	UEFA Europa League	1Q	(Moldova)	Sfântul Gheorghe	0–0 (p. 1–4) (H)	—N/a
2021–22	UEFA Champions League	1Q	(Bulgaria)	Ludogorets Razgrad	0–1 (A)	0–1 (H)
2021–22	UEFA Europa Conference League	2Q	(Luxembourg)	Fola Esch	1–2 (H)	0−1 (A)
2022–23	UEFA Champions League	1Q	(Slovenia)	Maribor	0–0 (A)	0–2 (H)
2022–23	UEFA Europa Conference League	3Q	(Romania)	CFR Cluj	0–0 (H)	0–1 (A)

== Managers ==
- (Belarus) Ivan Schyokin (July 1, 1997 – Dec 31, 1999)
- (Belarus) Yury Vyarheychyk (July 1, 2002 – May 11, 2009)
- (Belarus) Aleksey Vergeyenko (June 26, 2009 – Nov 23, 2009)
- (Russia) Eduard Malofeyev (Nov 24, 2009 – May 13, 2010)
- (Belarus) Uladzimir Zhuravel (May 14, 2010 – Dec 2, 2013)
- (Belarus) Sergei Borovsky (Jan 9, 2014–)
