= 2014–15 Belarusian Cup =

Tournament details
- Country: Belarus
- Teams: 53

Final positions
- Champions: BATE Borisov (3rd title)
- Runners-up: Shakhtyor Soligorsk

Tournament statistics
- Matches played: 56
- Goals scored: 172 (3.07 per match)
- Top goal scorer(s): Yuri Markhel (5 goals)

The 2014–15 Belarusian Cup was the 24th season of the Belarusian annual cup competition. Contrary to the league season, it has been conducted in a fall-spring rhythm. The first games were played on 22 May 2014. Winners of the Cup were to qualify for the second qualifying round of the 2015–16 UEFA Europa League, but since BATE also won the 2014 league season, they went into Champions League instead.

== Participating clubs ==
The following teams will take part in the competition:

2014 Belarusian Premier League all 12 teams	2014 Belarusian First League; 15 teams (of 16)	2014 Belarusian Second League; 22 teams (of 24)	Winners of regional cups 4 teams
BATE Borisov; Shakhtyor Soligorsk; Dinamo Minsk; Neman Grodno; Torpedo-BelAZ Zhodino; Gomel; Belshina Bobruisk; Dinamo Brest; Minsk; Naftan Novopolotsk; Dnepr Mogilev; Slutsk	Slavia Mozyr; Gorodeya; Vitebsk; Lida; Bereza-2010; Smorgon; Granit Mikashevichi; Smolevichi-STI; Isloch Minsk Raion; Khimik Svetlogorsk; Rechitsa-2014; Volna Pinsk; Slonim; Gomelzheldortrans; Zvezda-BGU Minsk	SKVICH Minsk; Neman Mosty; Zhlobin; Baranovichi; Orsha; Kobrin; Livadiya Dzerzhinsk; Osipovichi; Molodechno-2013; Partizan Minsk; Luch Minsk; Torpedo Minsk; Rogachev; Vertikal Kalinkovichi; Priozerye Verkhnedvinsk; AK Zhdanovichi; Slavyanin Minsk; Krumkachy Minsk; Belita-Viteks Uzda; Kletsk; Kolos-Druzhba Baranovichi Raion; UA-Stroy-Zhitkovichi	Energosbyt-BGATU Minsk (Minsk); Gorki (Mogilev Oblast); FSK Grodnenskiy (Grodno Oblast); Ruzhany (Brest Oblast)

1. Minsk-2 did not participate in this edition of the Cup.
2. Spartak Shklov and Vitebsk-2 did not participate in this edition of the Cup.

== Preliminary round ==
In the only match of the preliminary round played two teams from the Second League, which were drawn at random.

22 May 2014	Kolos-Druzhba (III)	4–4 (a.e.t.) (11–10 p)	Kletsk (III)	Gorodische
15:00	Kostyuchik 12'; Kuntush 32'; Karpesh 100'; Pavlyuchenko 112'	Report	Zuyevich 16'; Antsypov 58' (pen.), 95' (pen.); Kulikow 92'	Stadium: DYuSSh Stadium; Attendance: 50; Referee: Sergey Gorayutin (Minsk)
	Penalties
	Kostyuchik (penalty scored); Dmitrachkov (penalty scored); Mitsevich (penalty scored); German (penalty scored); Pavlyuchenko (penalty scored); Shumeyko (penalty scored); Abramovich (penalty scored); Matsul (penalty scored); Taykevich (penalty scored); Kostyuchik (penalty scored); Matsul (penalty missed); Dmitrachkov (penalty scored)		(penalty scored) Alekseichik; (penalty scored) Belash; (penalty scored) Kulikow; (penalty scored) Antsypov; (penalty scored) Fyodorov; (penalty scored) Zuyevich; (penalty scored) Klochkov; (penalty scored) Shalik; (penalty scored) Palchik; (penalty scored) Alekseichik; (penalty missed) Shalik; (penalty missed) Kulikow

== First round ==
In this round the winners of Preliminary Round were joined by another 19 clubs from the Second League and 4 amateur clubs. Zhlobin, as the team with the best record at the moment of the draw, were given a bye to the Second Round.

The draw was conducted on 8 May 2014. The matches were played between 25 and 27 May 2014.

25 May 2014	Ruzhany (A)	1–0	Neman Mosty (III)	Pruzhany
14:00	Milewski 55'	Report		Stadium: Mukhavets Stadium; Attendance: 250; Referee: Sergey Chistov (Minsk)

25 May 2014	Livadiya Dzerzhinsk (III)	2–0	SKVICH Minsk (III)	Dzerzhinsk
14:00	Stomal 22'; Pugachev 66'	Report		Stadium: City Stadium; Attendance: 150; Referee: Sergey Lobatseich (Vitebsk)

25 May 2014	FSK Grodnenskiy (A)	4–0	Kobrin (III)	Grodno
15:00	Rozumovich 40'; Klimets 56', 60', 73'	Report		Stadium: Neman Stadium; Attendance: 50; Referee: Kirill Pilipovets (Molodechno)

25 May 2014	Vertikal Kalinkovichi (III)	4–0	UA-Stroy-Zhitkovichi (III)	Kalinkovichy
16:00	Tikhanovsky 15'; Kachenya 36'; Budovich 41'; Mikhalenko 84'	Report		Stadium: Yunost Stadium; Attendance: 800; Referee: Vladimir Ischenko (Rechitsa)

25 May 2014	Baranovichi (III)	2–1	Luch Minsk (III)	Baranovichi
16:00	Chuduk 36'; Dovgilevich 60'	Report	Titov 64'	Stadium: Lokomotiv Stadium; Attendance: 600; Referee: Dmitry Dolya (Grodno)

25 May 2014	Osipovichi (III)	1–2 (a.e.t.)	Belita-Viteks Uzda (III)	Osipovichi
16:00	Minkov 88'	Report	Borodayenko 82'; Tikhonchik 103'	Stadium: Yunost Stadium; Attendance: 200; Referee: Mikhail Lavsky (Gomel)

25 May 2014	Kolos-Druzhba (III)	7–4	Slavyanin Minsk (III)	Gorodische
17:00	Pyzhik 7', 70'; Kuntush 9', 10'; Dmitrachkov 41'; Rushnitsky 53' (pen.); Pavlyuchenko 65'	Report	Ladutko 6', 79', 82' (pen.); Sukhanov 87'	Stadium: DYuSSh Stadium; Attendance: 100; Referee: Aleksey Obelevskiy (Grodno)

25 May 2014	Molodechno-2013 (III)	0–0 (a.e.t.) (6–5 p)	Priozerye Verkhnedvinsk (III)	Molodechno
17:00		Report		Stadium: City Stadium; Attendance: 140; Referee: Ivan Safaryan (Minsk)
	Penalties
	Grintsevich (penalty scored); Tribilo (penalty scored); Suman (penalty missed); Avizhen (penalty scored); Leonchik (penalty scored); Murashko (penalty scored); Golovnev (penalty scored)		(penalty missed) Korenevsky; (penalty scored) Kulenok; (penalty scored) Kuznyatsow; (penalty scored) Volkaw; (penalty scored) Tolstashev; (penalty scored) Boreyko; (penalty missed) Gorbatenko

25 May 2014	Gorki (A)	2–1	Orsha (III)	Gorki
17:00	Volkov 9'; Bubelev 44'	Report	Lomako 61'	Stadium: Sputnik Stadium; Attendance: 200; Referee: Valentin Bliznyuk (Minsk)

25 May 2014	Rogachev (III)	0–2	Partizan Minsk (III)	Rogachev
17:00		Report	Volkorezov 55'; Novokovskiy 77'	Stadium: DYuSSh-1 Stadium; Attendance: 1,100; Referee: Valery Golomzik (Bobruisk)

26 May 2014	AK Zhdanovichi (III)	1–0 (a.e.t.)	Torpedo Minsk (III)	Minsk
18:30	Kurhcak 96'	Report		Stadium: RCOP-BGU Stadium; Attendance: 150; Referee: Viktor Shimusik (Osipovichi)

27 May 2014	Energosbyt-BGATU Minsk (A)	0–3 (a.e.t.)	Krumkachy Minsk (III)	Minsk
17:30		Report	Marmyl 101'; Shapyatowski 105', 115'	Stadium: BGATU Stadium; Attendance: 350; Referee: Nikolay Vasko (Minsk)

== Second round ==
In this round 12 winners of the First Round were drawn against Zhlobin (given a bye to this round) and 11 clubs from the First League. Rechitsa-2014, Isloch Minsk Raion, Vitebsk and Slavia Mozyr were given a bye to the Round of 32 as teams with the best record at the moment of the draw.

The draw was conducted on 28 May 2014. The matches were played on 10 and 11 June 2014.

10 June 2014	Partizan Minsk (III)	1–1 (a.e.t.) (3–1 p)	Zhlobin (III)	Minsk
15:00	Kazyuchits 73'	Report	Kurgheli 87'	Stadium: SOK Olimpiysky; Attendance: 300; Referee: Sergey Lobatseich (Vitebsk)
	Penalties
	Gurenko (penalty scored); Korolchuk (penalty missed); Sakovich (penalty scored); Volkorezov (penalty missed); Zhibul (penalty scored)		(penalty missed) Torop; (penalty scored) Zakharanka; (penalty missed) Lapatko; (penalty missed) Malinovsky

11 June 2014	FSK Grodnenskiy (A)	1–0	Smolevichi-STI (II)	Grodno
15:00	Rozumovich 36' (pen.)	Report		Stadium: Neman Stadium; Attendance: 200; Referee: Vladimir Rusakov (Minsk)

11 June 2014	Baranovichi (III)	1–1 (a.e.t.) (3–2 p)	Bereza-2010 (II)	Baranovichi
17:00	Myat 21'	Report	Lutsevich 10'	Stadium: Lokomotiv Stadium; Attendance: 1,100; Referee: Dmitry Dolya (Grodno)
	Penalties
	Myat (penalty missed); Dovgilevich (penalty scored); Kotok (penalty scored); Artyukh (penalty scored)		(penalty scored) Azersky; (penalty missed) Bondarenko; (penalty missed) Gudel; (penalty scored) Lutsevich; (penalty missed) Zaleski

11 June 2014	Kolos-Druzhba (III)	0–3	Lida (II)	Gorodische
17:00		Report	Taraschik 54'; Kulakovsky 73'; Bombel 90'	Stadium: DYuSSh Stadium; Attendance: 70; Referee: Andrey Soroka (Smolevichi)

11 June 2014	Krumkachy Minsk (III)	0–3	Khimik Svetlogorsk (II)	Minsk
17:00		Report	Tishurov 4', 9'; Nozdrin-Plotnitsky 75'	Stadium: SOK Olimpiysky; Attendance: 150; Referee: Andrey Divakov (Mogilev)

11 June 2014	Vertikal Kalinkovichi (III)	0–6	Granit Mikashevichi (II)	Kalinkovichy
18:00		Report	Lebedzew 35', 59'; Kalpachuk 41'; Shidlovskiy 54'; Matveyev 76', 90+1'	Stadium: Yunost Stadium; Attendance: 500; Referee: Kirill Pilipovets (Molodechno)

11 June 2014	Belita-Viteks Uzda (III)	0–5	Zvezda-BGU Minsk (II)	Uzda
18:00		Report	Khodnevich 14' (pen.); Rusetsky 43'; Zhuk 82', 86'; Komlev 90'	Stadium: City Stadium; Attendance: 550; Referee: Mikhail Lavsky (Gomel)

11 June 2014	Livadiya Dzerzhinsk (III)	0–1	Volna Pinsk (II)	Dzerzhinsk
18:00		Report	Kalatsey 52'	Stadium: City Stadium; Attendance: 400; Referee: Vladimir Ischenko (Rechitsa)

11 June 2014	Ruzhany (A)	0–11	Smorgon (II)	Pruzhany
18:00		Report	Ryndzyuk 13', 19', 33'; Skvernyuk 14'; Markhel 41', 48', 69' (pen.), 74', 84'; Ravina 85'; Semyonov 89'	Stadium: Mukhavets Stadium; Attendance: 200; Referee: Sergey Stetsurin (Brest)

11 June 2014	AK Zhdanovichi (III)	0–0 (a.e.t.) (6–5 p)	Slonim (II)	Minsk
18:30		Report		Stadium: RCOP-BGU Stadium; Attendance: 200; Referee: Aleksei Kulbakov (Gomel)
	Penalties
	Samokhval (penalty scored); Parkalov (penalty scored); Dybal (penalty scored); Linsky (penalty scored); Kalechits (penalty scored); Nasanovich (penalty scored)		(penalty scored) Kurlovich; (penalty scored) Yuzvovich; (penalty scored) Kalenik; (penalty scored) Orochko; (penalty scored) Krasiy; (penalty missed) Kharitanovich

11 June 2014	Gorki (A)	0–7	Gomelzheldortrans (II)	Gorki
18:30		Report	Fedorenko 12', 50', 54'; Yudenkov 76'; Pyrkh 80'; Khmelev 81'; Zatenko 87'	Stadium: City Stadium; Attendance: 250; Referee: Dmitry Digilevich (Zhodino)

11 June 2014	Molodechno-2013 (III)	0–2	Gorodeya (II)	Molodechno
		Report	Chaley 26'; Saroka 38'	Stadium: City Stadium; Attendance: 200; Referee: Oleg Murashkevich (Novopolotsk)

== Round of 32 ==
In this round 12 winners of the Second Round were drawn against four First League clubs that were given bye to this round and 8 clubs from Premier League.

The four Premier League clubs that qualified for 2014–15 European Cups (BATE Borisov, Neman Grodno, Shakhtyor Soligorsk and Dinamo Minsk) were given a bye to the next round.

The draw was conducted on 17 June 2014. The matches were played between 25 and 27 July 2014.

25 July 2014	Lida (II)	0–1	Slutsk	Lida
18:00		Report	Hlyabko 74'	Stadium: Start Stadium; Attendance: 500; Referee: Yevgeniy Naumov (Minsk)

25 July 2014	Khimik Svetlogorsk (II)	1–2	Gomel	Svetlogorsk
18:00	Nozdrin-Plotnitsky 79'	Report	Sitko 1', 16'	Stadium: Bumazhnik Stadium; Attendance: 1,550; Referee: Vladimir Rusakov (Minsk)

26 July 2014	Zvezda-BGU Minsk (II)	1–0	Minsk	Minsk
14:30	Khodnevich 67'	Report		Stadium: Torpedo Stadium; Attendance: 300; Referee: Dmitry Yevnevich (Minsk)

26 July 2014	Baranovichi (III)	1–2	Dinamo Brest	Baranovichi
17:00	Fedortsov 45+1'	Report	Vasilyuk 21'; Perepechko 55' (pen.)	Stadium: Lokomotiv Stadium; Attendance: 1,600; Referee: Vladimir Kuzmin (Minsk)

26 July 2014	Volna Pinsk (II)	2–4	Isloch Minsk Raion (II)	Pinsk
17:30	Grinevich 18'; Znak 20'	Report	Kholodinsky 11'; Shapyatowski 12'; Barsukow 27'; Slabashevich 30'	Stadium: Volna Stadium; Attendance: 630; Referee: Pavel Rudenkov (Gomel)

26 July 2014	AK Zhdanovichi (III)	0–4	Naftan Novopolotsk	Minsk
18:00		Report	Yakimov 4'; Kerchu 15' (pen.), 30'; Dzemidovich 19' (pen.)	Stadium: SOK Olimpiysky; Attendance: 400; Referee: Andrey Vasilevich (Mozyr)

26 July 2014	Gomelzheldortrans (II)	2–1	Slavia Mozyr (II)	Gomel
18:00	Khmelev 31'; Zhostkin 88' (pen.)	Report	Kharitonchik 59'	Stadium: SDYuSShOR-8 Stadium; Attendance: 350; Referee: Sergey Lobatsevich (Vitebsk)

26 July 2014	Gorodeya (II)	0–0 (a.e.t.) (3–2 p)	Torpedo-BelAZ Zhodino	Gorodeya
18:00		Report		Stadium: Gorodeya Stadium; Attendance: 600; Referee: Sergey Stetsurin (Brest)
	Penalties
	D.Lebedew (penalty scored); Shmatko (penalty scored); Yadeshka (penalty scored); Maltsaw (penalty missed)		(penalty scored) D.Platonaw; (penalty missed) Lyavitski; (penalty missed) Ivashko; (penalty scored) Selyava; (penalty missed) Kazeka

26 July 2014	Smorgon (II)	0–2	Dnepr Mogilev	Smorgon
18:00		Report	Tereshchenko 45'; Shumanov 50' (o.g.)	Stadium: Yunost Stadium; Attendance: 300; Referee: Kirill Pilipovets (Molodechno)

26 July 2014	FSK Grodnenskiy (A)	1–4	Belshina Bobruisk	Grodno
18:00	Rozumovich 73'	Report	Burko 13'; Tsimashenka 56'; Kardash 58' (o.g.); Kaminsky 77'	Stadium: Neman Stadium; Attendance: 500; Referee: Pavel Koronets (Zhodino)

26 July 2014	Granit Mikashevichi (II)	1–0	Rechitsa-2014 (II)	Luninets
18:30	Ignatenko 70'	Report		Stadium: Polesye Stadium; Attendance: 300; Referee: Dmitry Dolya (Grodno)

27 July 2014	Partizan Minsk (III)	1–3	Vitebsk (II)	Minsk
15:00	Sakovich 82' (pen.)	Report	Dzegtseraw 64'; Lenichko 67'; Baranok 74'	Stadium: SOK Olimpiysky; Attendance: 350; Referee: Sergey Krasnikov (Grodno)

== Round of 16 ==
The draw was conducted on 28 July 2014. The matches were played between 23 August and 13 October 2014.

23 August 2014	Isloch Minsk Raion (II)	1–1 (a.e.t.) (4–5 p)	Granit Mikashevichi (II)	Minsk
13:00	Shapyatowski 41' (pen.)	Report	Aleksiyan 65'	Stadium: SOK Olimpiysky; Attendance: 100; Referee: Oleg Murashkevich (Novopolotsk)
	Penalties
	Misyuk (penalty scored); Bubnow (penalty scored); Lebedzew (penalty missed); Shapyatowski (penalty scored); Shibeko (penalty missed); Rochev (penalty scored); Lynko (penalty missed); Krotaw (penalty missed)		(penalty missed) Sherakow; (penalty missed) Truhaw; (penalty scored) Hovavko; (penalty scored) Aleksiyan; (penalty scored) Ignatenko; (penalty scored) Khaletski; (penalty missed) Matveyev; (penalty scored) Kuntsevich

23 August 2014	Naftan Novopolotsk	1–2	Vitebsk (II)	Novopolotsk
16:00	Shkabara 79' (pen.)	Report	Shakaw 26' (pen.), 30'	Stadium: Atlant Stadium; Attendance: 1,000; Referee: Ivan Safaryan (Minsk)

23 August 2014	Belshina Bobruisk	1–0	Zvezda-BGU Minsk (II)	Bobruisk
17:00	Turlin 54'	Report		Stadium: Spartak Stadium; Attendance: 600; Referee: Igor Kruk (Molodechno)

24 August 2014	Neman Grodno	5–4 (a.e.t.)	Gomel	Grodno
16:00	Yasinski 58'; Rekish 60'; Kavalyonak 65'; Lyahchylin 78'; Savitski 97'	Report	Kamarowski 8'; Matsveenka 28'; Sitko 39'; Chelidze 84'	Stadium: Neman Stadium; Attendance: 1,000; Referee: Denis Scherbakov (Minsk)

24 August 2014	Gomelzheldortrans (II)	0–2	Dinamo Brest	Gomel
17:00		Report	Kurlovich 13'; Semenyuk 29'	Stadium: SDYuSShOR-8 Stadium; Attendance: 500; Referee: Vadim Panchenko (Mogilev)

24 September 2014	Shakhtyor Soligorsk	1–0	Gorodeya (II)	Soligorsk
18:30	Mikoliūnas 8'	Report		Stadium: Stroitel Stadium; Attendance: 600; Referee: Igor Kruk (Molodechno)

11 October 2014	BATE Borisov	2–1 (a.e.t.)	Slutsk	Borisov
17:00	Tubić 86'; Signevich 108'	Report	Saito 61'	Stadium: City Stadium; Attendance: 2,300; Referee: Igor Kruk (Molodechno)

13 October 2014	Dnepr Mogilev	0–1	Dinamo Minsk	Mogilev
19:00		Report	Figueredo 50'	Stadium: Spartak Stadium; Attendance: 1,000; Referee: Oleg Murashkevich (Novopolotsk)

== Quarterfinals ==
The draw was conducted on 16 October 2014. The first leg were played on 21 and 22 March and the second leg were played on 4 April 2015.

Team 1	Agg.	Team 2	1st leg	2nd leg
Belshina Bobruisk	1–2	Dinamo Brest	0–0	1–2
BATE Borisov	3–1	Neman Grodno	1–0	2–1
Dinamo Minsk	4–3	Vitebsk	1–2	3–1 (aet)
Granit Mikashevichi	0–3	Shakhtyor Soligorsk	0–0	0–3

=== First leg ===
21 March 2015	Belshina Bobruisk	0–0	Dinamo Brest	Minsk
14:00		Report		Stadium: KFP Minsk; Attendance: 1,000; Referee: Oleg Murashkevich (Novopolotsk)

21 March 2015	BATE Borisov	1–0	Neman Grodno	Borisov
19:30	Baha 41'	Report		Stadium: Borisov Arena; Attendance: 5,127; Referee: Vadim Panchenko (Mogilev)

22 March 2015	Dinamo Minsk	1–2	Vitebsk	Minsk
14:00	Palitsevich 45'	Report	Skitaw 26'; Lebedzew 50'	Stadium: KFP Minsk; Attendance: 1,950; Referee: Igor Kruk (Molodechno)

22 March 2015	Granit Mikashevichi	0–0	Shakhtyor Soligorsk	Luninets
16:00		Report		Stadium: Polesye Stadium; Attendance: 1,000; Referee: Denis Scherbakov (Minsk)

=== Second leg ===
4 April 2015	Vitebsk	1–3 (a.e.t.) (3–4 agg.)	Dinamo Minsk	Vitebsk
13:00	Salavey 47'	Report	Bećiraj 10', 41', 92'	Stadium: Vitebsky CSK; Attendance: 5,500; Referee: Vitaly Sevostyanik (Grodno)

4 April 2015	Dinamo Brest	2–1 (2–1 agg.)	Belshina Bobruisk	Brest
14:00	Premudrov 30'; Vasilyuk 42'	Report	Shahoyka 18'	Stadium: OSK Brestskiy; Attendance: 800; Referee: Igor Kruk (Molodechno)

4 April 2015	Neman Grodno	1–2 (1–3 agg.)	BATE Borisov	Grodno
16:00	Zabelin 82'	Report	Rodionov 48'; Gordeichuk 55'	Stadium: Neman Stadium; Attendance: 1,500; Referee: Mikhail Lavsky (Gomel)

4 April 2015	Shakhtyor Soligorsk	3–0 (3–0 agg.)	Granit Mikashevichi	Soligorsk
16:30	Starhorodskyi 16' (pen.); Yanush 74', 76'	Report		Stadium: Stroitel Stadium; Attendance: 1,500; Referee: Sergey Tsinkevich (Osipovichi)

== Semifinals ==
The draw was conducted on 6 April 2015. The first legs were played on 15 April and the second legs were played on 29 April 2015.

Team 1	Agg.	Team 2	1st leg	2nd leg
Shakhtyor Soligorsk	2–1	Dinamo Brest	0–0	2–1
BATE Borisov	3–1	Dinamo Minsk	0–0	3–1

=== First leg ===
15 April 2015	Shakhtyor Soligorsk	0–0	Dinamo Brest	Soligorsk
18:30		Report		Stadium: Stroitel Stadium; Attendance: 1,400; Referee: Vitaly Sevostyanik (Grodno)

15 April 2015	BATE Borisov	0–0	Dinamo Minsk	Borisov
19:30		Report		Stadium: Borisov Arena; Attendance: 5,421; Referee: Sergey Tsinkevich (Osipovichi)

=== Second leg ===
29 April 2015	Dinamo Minsk	1–3 (1–3 agg.)	BATE Borisov	Minsk
17:30	Bećiraj 78'	Report	Gordeichuk 51', 69'; Rodionov 58'	Stadium: Traktor Stadium; Attendance: 2,500; Referee: Vadim Panchenko (Mogilev)

29 April 2015	Dinamo Brest	1–2 (1–2 agg.)	Shakhtyor Soligorsk	Brest
20:00	Premudrov 81'	Report	Starhorodskyi 26'; Shcherba 45' (o.g.)	Stadium: OSK Brestskiy; Attendance: 2,800; Referee: Denis Scherbakov (Minsk)

== Final ==
The final match was played on 24 May 2015 at the Central Stadium in Gomel.

24 May 2015
17:00

BATE Borisov	4–1	Shakhtyor Soligorsk
Gordeichuk 52'; Rodionov 61'; Karnitsky 65'; Signevich 73'	Report	Kamarowski 72'

Central Stadium, Gomel
Attendance: 9,100
Referee: Igor Kruk (Molodechno)

BATE:
GK	16	(Belarus) Syarhey Chernik
DF	25	(Serbia) Filip Mladenović
DF	19	(Serbia) Nemanja Milunović	(yellow card) 33'
DF	33	(Belarus) Dzyanis Palyakow
DF	15	(Belarus) Maksim Zhavnerchik
MF	55	(Belarus) Dzmitry Baha		(substituted off) 46'
MF	5	(Belarus) Yevgeniy Yablonskiy
MF	7	(Belarus) Alyaksandr Karnitsky
MF	62	(Belarus) Mikhail Gordeichuk	(yellow card) 80'
MF	22	(Belarus) Ihar Stasevich		(substituted off) 76'
FW	20	(Belarus) Vitali Rodionov (c)		(substituted off) 71'
Substitutes:
GK	34	(Belarus) Artem Soroko
MF	2	(Belarus) Dzmitry Likhtarovich
DF	4	(Latvia) Kaspars Dubra
FW	13	(Belarus) Mikalay Signevich		(substituted on) 71'
MF	17	(Belarus) Alyaksey Ryas		(substituted on) 54'
MF	23	(Belarus) Edhar Alyakhnovich
DF	42	(Belarus) Maksim Valadzko		(substituted on) 46'
Manager:
(Belarus) Alyaksandr Yermakovich

SHAKHTYOR:
GK	16	(Belarus) Uladzimir Bushma
DF	3	(Belarus) Syarhey Matsveychyk
DF	18	(Belarus) Pavel Rybak
DF	4	(Belarus) Alyaksey Yanushkevich
DF	14	(Ukraine) Vasyl Kobin
MF	5	(Belarus) Alyaksandr Yurevich		(substituted off) 70'
MF	11	(Ukraine) Artem Starhorodskyi (c)	(yellow card) 86'
MF	23	(Belarus) Yury Kavalyow
MF	13	(Lithuania) Saulius Mikoliūnas		(substituted off) 73'
FW	7	(Serbia) Nemanja Čović
FW	15	(Belarus) Dzmitry Kamarowski	(yellow card) 44'
Substitutes:
GK	1	(Estonia) Artur Kotenko
DF	2	(Belarus) Mikhail Shibun		(substituted on) 73'
DF	8	(Belarus) Mikhail Afanasyev
FW	9	(Belarus) Kiryl Vyarheychyk
FW	10	(Belarus) Mikalay Yanush
DF	19	(Belarus) Ihar Kuzmyanok
MF	20	(Ukraine) Yaroslav Martynyuk		(substituted on) 70'
Manager:
(Belarus) Sergei Borovsky
