= 2011 in Belarusian football =

The 2011 season is the 75th season of competitive football in Belarus.

== National teams ==
The home team or the team that is designated as the home team is listed in the left column; the away team is in the right column.

Win Draw Loss

=== Senior ===
==== Friendly matches ====
9 February 2011	Belarus	1 – 1	Kazakhstan	Antalya, Turkey
17:00 UTC+02	Hleb 45' (pen.)	(Report)	Ostapenko 90+2'	Stadium: Antalya Atatürk Stadium; Attendance: 1,500; Referee: Veaceslav Banari (Moldova)

29 March 2011	Belarus	0 – 1	Canada	Antalya, Turkey
18:00 UTC+03		(Report)	Hainault 56'	Stadium: Antalya Atatürk Stadium; Attendance: 100; Referee: Yunus Yıldırım (Turkey)

10 August 2011	Belarus	1 – 0	Bulgaria	Minsk, Belarus
20:00 UTC+03	Kislyak 33'	(Report)		Stadium: Dynama Stadium

11 October 2011	Belarus	0 – 2	Poland	Wiesbaden, Germany
21:30 UTC+03		(Report)	Błaszczykowski 30'; Lewandowski 69'	Stadium: BRITA-Arena; Referee: Peter Sippel (Germany)

15 November 2011	Belarus	1 – 1	Libya	Dubai, United Arab Emirates
19:30 UTC+04	Kornilenko 77'	(Report)	Saad 32'	Stadium: Dubai Club Stadium; Referee: Mohammed Abdulla Mohammed (United Arab Emirates)

==== UEFA Euro 2012 qualifying ====
26 March 2011 Group D	Albania	1 – 0	Belarus	Tirana, Albania
20:00 UTC+01	Salihi 62'	(Report)		Stadium: Qemal Stafa Stadium; Attendance: 11,500; Referee: Markus Strömbergsson (Sweden)

3 June 2011 Group D	Belarus	1 – 1	France	Minsk, Belarus
21:50 UTC+03	Abidal 20' (o.g.)	(Report)	Malouda 22'	Stadium: Dynama Stadium; Attendance: 27,000; Referee: David Fernández Borbalán (Spain)

7 June 2011 Group D	Belarus	2 – 0	Luxembourg	Minsk, Belarus
20:00 UTC+03	Kornilenko 48' (pen.); Putsila 73'	(Report)		Stadium: Dynama Stadium; Attendance: 9,500; Referee: Anar Salmanov (Azerbaijan)

2 September 2011 Group D	Belarus	0 – 2	Bosnia and Herzegovina	Minsk, Belarus
20:30 UTC+03		(Report)	Salihović 21' (pen.); Medunjanin 24'	Stadium: Dynama Stadium; Attendance: 28,500; Referee: Viktor Kassai (Hungary)

6 September 2011 Group D	Bosnia and Herzegovina	1 – 0	Belarus	Zenica, Bosnia and Herzegovina
20:15 UTC+02	Misimović 87'	(Report)		Stadium: Bilino Polje; Attendance: 15,292; Referee: Martin Atkinson (England)

7 October 2011 Group D	Romania	2 – 2	Belarus	Bucharest, Romania
21:30 UTC+03	Mutu 19', 51' (pen.)	(Report)	Kornilenko 45'; Drahun 82'	Stadium: Arena Națională; Attendance: 29,486; Referee: Alan Kelly (Ireland)

=== Under-21 ===
==== 2011 UEFA European Under-21 Football Championship ====
11 June 2011 Group A	Belarus	2 – 0	Iceland	Aarhus, Denmark
18:00 UTC+02	Varankow 77' (pen.); Skavysh 87'	(Report)		Stadium: Aarhus Stadion; Attendance: 2,815; Referee: Aleksandar Stavrev (Macedonia)

14 June 2011 Group A	Denmark	2 – 1	Belarus	Aarhus, Denmark
20:45 UTC+02	Eriksen 22'; Jørgensen 71'	(Report)	Baha 20'	Stadium: Aarhus Stadion; Attendance: 18,152; Referee: Paolo Tagliavento (Italy)

18 June 2011 Group A	Switzerland	3 – 0	Belarus	Aarhus, Denmark
20:45 UTC+02	Mehmedi 6' (pen.), 43'; Feltscher 90+3'	(Report)		Stadium: Aarhus Stadion; Attendance: 1,604; Referee: Markus Strömbergsson (Sweden)

22 June 2011 Semifinals	Spain	3 – 1 (a.e.t.)	Belarus	Viborg, Denmark
18:00 UTC+02	Adrián 89', 105'; Jeffrén 113'	(Report)	Varankow 38'	Stadium: Viborg Stadion; Attendance: 7,521; Referee: Markus Strömbergsson (Sweden)

25 June 2011 Third place	Czech Republic	0 – 1	Belarus	Aalborg, Denmark
15:00 UTC+02		(Report)	Filipenko 88'	Stadium: Aalborg Stadion; Attendance: 870; Referee: Milorad Mažić (Serbia)

==== 2011 UEFA European Under-21 Football Championship qualification ====
10 August 2011 Group 1	Greece	2 – 3	Belarus	Ioannina, Greece
18:30 UTC+03	Potouridis 37' (pen.); Fortounis 87'	(Report)	Khlebosolov 13', 90+4' (pen.); Patotski 18'	Stadium: Zosimades Stadium

2 September 2011 Group 1	Belarus	1 – 1	Bosnia and Herzegovina	Barysaw, Belarus
16:30 UTC+03	Kuzmyanok 16'	(Report)	Višća 14'	Stadium: Haradzki Stadium; Referee: Oliver Drachta (Austria)

6 September 2011 Group 1	Belarus	0 – 1	Germany	Barysaw, Belarus
18:15 UTC+03		(Report)	Esswein 28'	Stadium: Haradzki Stadium; Referee: Antonio Mateu Lahoz (Spain)

7 October 2011 Group 1	Cyprus	1 – 3	Belarus	Larnaca, Cyprus
14:30 UTC+02	Mitidis 15'	(Report)	Christofides 26' (o.g.); Patotski 41'; Khlebosolov 88'	Stadium: Ammochostos Stadium; Attendance: 100; Referee: Dimitar Meckarovski (Macedonia)

11 October 2011 Group 1	Belarus	1 – 3	Greece	Barysaw, Belarus
18:00 UTC+03	Patotski 40'	(Report)	Lebedzew 56' (o.g.); Potouridis 67'; Vellios 68'	Stadium: Haradski Stadium; Attendance: 1,100; Referee: Artyom Kuchin (Kazakhstan)

11 November 2011 Group 1	San Marino	0 – 2	Belarus	Serravalle, San Marino
20:30 UTC+01		(Report)	Khlebosolov 34' (pen.); Kuhan 54'	Stadium: Stadio Olimpico; Attendance: 230; Referee: Suren Baliyan (Armenia)

=== Under-19 ===
==== 2011 UEFA European Under-19 Football Championship elite qualification ====
24 May 2011 Group 3	France	2 – 0	Belarus	Senec, Slovakia
17:00 UTC+02	Derouard 25'; Taïder 35'	(Report)		Stadium: NTC Senec; Referee: Jakob Kehlet (Denmark)

22 May 2011 Group 3	Belarus	0 – 5	Slovakia	Senec, Slovakia
11:00 UTC+02		(Report)	Špilár 19', 74'; Škvarka 45+2'; Hladík 68'; Aliseiko 78' (o.g.)	Stadium: The Slovak FA National Training Centre; Referee: Jakob Kehlet (Denmark)

25 May 2011 Group 3	Greece	1 – 0	Belarus	Nitra, Slovakia
11:00 UTC+02	Mavrias 49'	(Report)		Stadium: Štadión pod Zoborom; Referee: Anar Salmanov (Azerbaijan)

==== 2012 UEFA European Under-19 Football Championship qualification ====
6 October 2011 Group 7	Belarus	0 – 0	Montenegro	Dungannon, Northern Ireland
14:00 UTC+01		(Report)		Stadium: Stangmore Park; Attendance: 15; Referee: Ruddy Buquet (France)

8 October 2011 Group 7	Belarus	1 – 3	Northern Ireland	Belfast, Northern Ireland
20:00 UTC+01	Savitski 72'	(Report)	McCartan 13'; McLaughlin 37'; McLellan 84'	Stadium: The Oval; Attendance: 240; Referee: Mattias Gestranius (Finland)

11 October 2011 Group 7	Germany	3 – 3	Belarus	Portadown, Northern Ireland
13:00 UTC+01	Heintz 49'; Hofmann 55', 83'	(Report)	Kovalev 8'; Yadeshka 33'; Klopotski 38'	Stadium: Shamrock Park; Attendance: 50; Referee: Ruddy Buquet (France)

=== Under-17 ===
==== 2011 UEFA European Under-17 Football Championship elite qualification ====
25 March 2011 Group 6	Norway	5 – 1	Belarus	Saint-Herblain, France
15:00 UTC+01	Kwoeme 29'; Rønning 26', 40+1', 56'; Berisha 47'	(Report)	Savitski 22'	Stadium: Parc du Val de Chezine; Referee: Szymon Marciniak (Poland)

27 March 2011 Group 6	Belarus	1 – 0	Georgia	Vigneux-de-Bretagne, France
15:00 UTC+02	Savitski 23'	(Report)		Stadium: Municipal; Referee: Anastasios Sidiropoulos (Greece)

30 March 2011 Group 6	France	9 – 0	Belarus	Carquefou, France
17:00 UTC+02	Yaisien 14', 35', 39', 68'; Nangis 21', 24', 71'; Laporte 27'; Haller 80+1' (pen.)	(Report)		Stadium: Stade du Moulin-Boisseau; Referee: Szymon Marciniak (Poland)

==== 2012 UEFA European Under-17 Football Championship qualification ====
23 September 2011 Group 1	Hungary	4 – 1	Belarus	Telki, Hungary
15:00 UTC+02	Tamás 16' (pen.), 53'; Asztalos 32'; Bobál 90+2'	(Report)	Rassadkin 71'	Stadium: Globall Football Park; Attendance: 100; Referee: Christof Dierick (Belgium)

25 September 2011 Group 1	Norway	0 – 3	Belarus	Telki, Hungary
12:00 UTC+02		(Report)	Vodyanovich 11'; Morozov 38' Rassadkin 68'	Stadium: Globall Football Park; Attendance: 200; Referee: Neil Doyle (Ireland)

28 September 2011 Group 1	Belarus	5 – 0	Andorra	Tatabánya, Hungary
15:00 UTC+02	Zhurnevich 15'; Morozov 18'; Rassadkin 30' (pen.); Gribovski 60'; Vershitski 69'	(Report)		Stadium: Városi Stadion; Attendance: 30; Referee: Neil Doyle (Ireland)

== League tables ==
=== Belarusian Premier League ===
Pos	Team	Pld	W	D	L	GF	GA	GD	Pts	Qualification or relegation
1	BATE Borisov (C)	33	18	12	3	53	20	+33	66	Qualification for Champions League second qualifying round
2	Shakhtyor Soligorsk	33	17	10	6	46	24	+22	61	Qualification for Europa League second qualifying round
3	Gomel	33	13	15	5	36	24	+12	54	Qualification for Europa League first qualifying round
4	Dinamo Minsk	33	14	7	12	50	43	+7	49	
5	Belshina Bobruisk	33	12	12	9	41	35	+6	48	
6	Torpedo-BelAZ Zhodino	33	9	14	10	37	41	−4	41	
7	Naftan Novopolotsk	33	10	7	16	35	45	−10	37	Qualification for Europa League second qualifying round (Note: Winners of 2011–12 Belarusian Cup will qualify for the second qualifying round of UEFA Europa League)
8	Neman Grodno	33	8	13	12	33	45	−12	37	
9	Minsk	33	8	11	14	33	40	−7	35	
10	Dinamo Brest	33	8	11	14	38	46	−8	35	
11	Vitebsk (R)	33	8	8	17	29	46	−17	32	Qualification to relegation play-offs
12	Dnepr Mogilev (R)	33	6	14	13	29	51	−22	32	Relegation to Belarusian First League

Source: football.by
Rules for classification: 1st points; 2nd matches won; 3rd head-to-head (points, matches won, goal difference, goals scored); 4th goal difference; 5th goals scored
(C) Champions; (R) Relegated

=== Belarusian First League ===
Pos	Team	Pld	W	D	L	GF	GA	GD	Pts	Promotion or relegation
1	Slavia Mozyr (P)	30	22	5	3	53	17	+36	71	Promotion to Belarusian Premier League
2	Partizan Minsk (P)	30	20	5	5	59	26	+33	65	Qualification for promotion play-off
3	Gorodeya	30	16	7	7	51	31	+20	55	
4	SKVICH Minsk	30	16	6	8	57	27	+30	54	
5	Slutsk	30	13	10	7	44	33	+11	49	
6	Vedrich-97 Rechitsa	30	13	7	10	40	34	+6	46	
7	Volna Pinsk	30	13	6	11	52	38	+14	45	
8	Granit Mikashevichi	30	11	10	9	38	35	+3	43	
9	Klechesk Kletsk (Note: Klechesk were denied First League licence for 2012 due to financial troubles.) (R)	30	12	5	13	45	42	+3	41	Relegation to Belarusian Second League
10	Polotsk	30	9	8	13	36	39	−3	35	
11	Smorgon	30	9	7	14	32	45	−13	34	
12	DSK Gomel	30	8	10	12	28	34	−6	34	
13	Rudensk	30	9	6	15	25	40	−15	33	
14	Khimik Svetlogorsk	30	10	2	18	32	48	−16	32	
15	Belcard Grodno (R)	30	8	5	17	30	55	−25	29	Relegation to Belarusian Second League
16	Baranovichi (R)	30	0	3	27	10	90	−80	3	Relegation to Belarusian Second League

Source: football.by
Rules for classification: 1st points; 2nd matches won; 3rd head-to-head (points, matches won, goal difference, goals scored); 4th goal difference; 5th goals scored
(P) Promoted; (R) Relegated

== Domestic cups ==
=== Belarusian Cup ===
Quarterfinals
1	Partizan Minsk	0	2	2
8	Gomel	0	3	3
4	Shakhtyor Soligorsk	2	1	3
5	Dinamo Brest	1	1	2
2	Belshina Bobruisk	0	2	2
7	Minsk	1	0	1
3	Neman Grodno	1	2	3
6	Naftan Novopolotsk	1	0	1

Semifinals
Gomel	0	3	3
Shakhtyor Soligorsk	1	1	2
Belshina Bobruisk	0	0	0
Neman Grodno	0	1	1

Final
Gomel
Neman Grodno

=== Final ===
29 May 2011
16:50 UTC+03

Neman Grodno	0 – 2	Gomel
	(Report)	Rybak 88' (o.g.); Stasevich 90'

Traktar Stadium, Minsk
Attendance: 9,000
Referee: Sergey Tsinkevich

=== Belarusian Super Cup ===
27 February 2011
17:00 UTC+02

BATE Borisov	3 – 0	Torpedo Zhodino
Baha 29'; Bressan 86'; Nekhaychik 90+2'	(Report)

Krytyj futbolnyj Manesh, Minsk
Attendance: 1,600
Referee: Sergey Sakharevich

== Belarusian clubs in international competitions ==
Club	Competition	Final round
BATE	2011–12 UEFA Champions League	Group Stage
Minsk	2011–12 UEFA Europa League	Second qualifying round
Shakhtyor	2011–12 UEFA Europa League	Second qualifying round
Gomel	2011–12 UEFA Europa League	Third qualifying round

=== FC BATE Borisov ===
13 July 2011 Champions League Second round	Linfield (Northern Ireland)	1 – 1	(Belarus) BATE	Belfast, Northern Ireland
19:45 UTC+01	Fordyce 5'; Bressan 37' (pen.)	(Report)		Stadium: Windsor Park; Attendance: 1,212; Referee: Paweł Gil (Poland)

19 July 2011 Champions League Second round	BATE (Belarus)	2 – 0	(Northern Ireland) Linfield	Barysaw, Belarus
19:00 UTC+03	Nyakhaychyk 58'; Pawlaw 61'	(Report)		Stadium: Haradzki Stadium; Attendance: 5,200; Referee: Libor Kovařík (Czech Republic)

26 July 2011 Champions League Third round	Ekranas (Lithuania)	0 – 0	(Belarus) BATE	Panevėžys, Lithuania
19:00 UTC+03		(Report)		Stadium: Aukštaitija Stadium; Attendance: 2,989; Referee: Deniz Aytekin (Germany)

2 August 2011 Champions League Third round	BATE (Belarus)	3 – 1	(Lithuania) Ekranas	Barysaw, Belarus
19:00 UTC+03	Rodionov 18'; Bressan 35'; Gordeichuk 89'	(Report)	Velička 22'	Stadium: Haradzki Stadium; Referee: Hüseyin Göçek (Turkey)

16 August 2011 Champions League Play-off round	BATE (Belarus)	1 – 1	(Austria) Sturm Graz	Minsk, Belarus
21:45 UTC+03	Simić 59'	(Report)	Weber 12'	Stadium: Dynama Stadium; Attendance: 15,550; Referee: Svein Oddvar Moen (Norway)

24 August 2011 Champions League Play-off round	Sturm Graz (Austria)	0 – 2	(Belarus) BATE	Graz, Austria
20:45 UTC+02		(Report)	Volodko 36'; Simić 70'	Stadium: UPC-Arena; Attendance: 14,520; Referee: Jonas Eriksson (Sweden)

13 September 2011 Champions League Group H	Viktoria Plzeň (Czech Republic)	1 – 1	(Belarus) BATE	Prague, Czech Republic
20:45 UTC+02	Bakoš 45+1'	(Report)	Bressan 69'	Stadium: Synot Tip Arena; Attendance: 19,451; Referee: Laurent Duhamel (France)

28 September 2011 Champions League Group H	BATE (Belarus)	0 – 5	(Spain) Barcelona	Minsk, Belarus
21:45 UTC+03		(Report)	Valadzko 19' (o.g.); Pedro 22'; Messi 38', 56'; Villa 90'	Stadium: Dynama Stadium; Attendance: 29,555; Referee: Manuel Gräfe (Germany)

19 October 2011 Champions League Group H	Milan (Italy)	2 – 0	(Belarus) BATE	Milan, Italy
20:45 UTC+02	Ibrahimović 33'; Boateng 70'	(Report)		Stadium: San Siro; Attendance: 66,040; Referee: Tom Harald Hagen (Norway)

1 November 2011 Champions League Group H	BATE (Belarus)	1 – 1	(Italy) Milan	Minsk, Belarus
18:00 UTC+02	Bressan 55' (pen.)	(Report)	Ibrahimović 22'	Stadium: Dynama Stadium; Attendance: 29,100; Referee: Peter Rasmussen (Denmark)

23 November 2011 Champions League Group H	BATE (Belarus)	0 – 1	(Czech Republic) Viktoria Plzeň	Minsk, Belarus
18:00 UTC+02		(Report)	Bakoš 42'	Stadium: Dynama Stadium; Attendance: 26,520; Referee: Kevin Blom (Netherlands)

6 December 2011 Champions League Group H	Barcelona (Spain)	4 – 0	(Belarus) BATE	Barcelona, Spain
20:45 UTC+01	Roberto 35'; Montoya 60'; Pedro 63', 89' (pen.)	(Report)		Stadium: Camp Nou; Attendance: 37,374; Referee: William Collum (Scotland)

=== FC Minsk ===
30 June 2011 Europa League First round	AZAL Baku (Azerbaijan)	1 – 1	(Belarus) Minsk	Baku, Azerbaijan
19:00 UTC+04	Ibekoyi 14'	(Report)	Voronkov 11'	Stadium: AZAL Stadium; Attendance: 2,900; Referee: Andris Treimanis (Latvia)

7 July 2011 Europa League First round	Minsk (Belarus)	2 – 1	(Azerbaijan) AZAL Baku	Minsk, Belarus
20:00 UTC+03	Lashankow 5'; Sashcheka 11'	(Report)	Sachywka 66' (o.g.)	Stadium: Dynama Stadium; Attendance: 3,000; Referee: Angel Angelov (Bulgaria)

14 July 2011 Europa League Second round	Minsk (Belarus)	1 – 1	(Turkey) Gaziantepspor	Minsk, Belarus
20:00 UTC+03	Razin 22'	(Report)	Sachywka 51' (o.g.)	Stadium: Dynama Stadium; Attendance: 4,200; Referee: Thorsten Kinhöfer (Germany)

21 July 2011 Europa League Second round	Gaziantepspor (Turkey)	4 – 1	(Belarus) Minsk	Gaziantep, Turkey
21:00 UTC+03	Güngör 28'; Wágner 73'; Popov 83'; Adın 90+1'	(Report)	Zyanko 61'	Stadium: Gaziantep Kamil Ocak Stadium; Attendance: 6,499; Referee: Marijo Strahonja (Croatia)

=== FC Shakhtyor Soligorsk ===
14 July 2011 Europa League Second round	Shakhtyor Soligorsk (Belarus)	0 – 1	(Latvia) Ventspils	Salihorsk, Belarus
20:00 UTC+03		(Report)	Kosmačovs 89'	Stadium: Stroitel Stadium; Attendance: 3,020; Referee: Tamás Bognar (Hungary)

21 July 2011 Europa League Second round	Ventspils (Latvia)	3 – 2	(Belarus) Shakhtyor Soligorsk	Ventspils, Latvia
18:30 UTC+03	Mvondo 52', 79' (pen.); Martinez 90+3'	(Report)	Kolomyts 6'; Kamarowski 73'	Stadium: Ventspils Olimpiskais Stadions; Attendance: 2,500; Referee: Espen Berntsen (Norway)

=== FC Gomel ===
28 July 2011 Europa League Third round	Bursaspor (Turkey)	2 – 1	(Belarus) Gomel	Bursa, Turkey
20:30 UTC+03	Aziz 52'; Kaş 72'	(Report)	Kuzmyanok 42'	Stadium: Bursa Atatürk Stadium; Attendance: 16,122; Referee: Alain Bieri (Switzerland)

4 August 2011 Europa League Third round	Gomel (Belarus)	1 – 3	(Turkey) Bursaspor	Gomel, Belarus
20:00 UTC+03	Aleksiyevich 41'	(Report)	N'Diaye 78'; Insúa 85'; Bahadır 90+1'	Stadium: Central Stadion; Attendance: 13,100; Referee: Marius Avram (Romania)
