= 2013 UEFA European Under-21 Championship qualification Group 1 =

Football tournament qualification stage

The teams competing in Group 1 of the 2013 UEFA European Under-21 Championship qualifying competition were Belarus, Bosnia and Herzegovina, Cyprus, Germany, Greece and San Marino.

== Standings ==
Pos	Team	Pld	W	D	L	GF	GA	GD	Pts	Qualification	(Germany)	(Bosnia and Herzegovina)	(Greece)	(Belarus)	(Cyprus)	(San Marino)
1	Germany	10	9	1	0	39	9	+30	28	Play-offs	—	3–0	1–0	3–0	4–1	7–0
2	Bosnia and Herzegovina	10	6	2	2	25	12	+13	20		4–4	—	4–0	3–0	5–1	3–1
3	Greece	10	4	1	5	14	15	−1	13		4–5	0–1	—	2–3	1–0	2–0
4	Belarus	10	4	1	5	11	17	−6	13		0–1	1–1	1–3	—	0–3	1–0
5	Cyprus	10	4	0	6	16	20	−4	12		0–3	2–1	0–2	1–3	—	6–0
6	San Marino	10	0	1	9	2	34	−32	1		0–8	0–3	0–0	0–2	1–2	—

== Results and fixtures ==
29 March 2011
15:00 CEST

Cyprus	6–0	San Marino
Dimosthenous 6'; Demetriou 28'; Michael 53', 76', 85' (pen.); Sielis 70'	Report

GSP Stadium, Nicosia
Attendance: 200
Referee: Davit Kharitonashvili (Georgia)

1 June 2011
20:30 CEST

San Marino	0–3	Bosnia and Herzegovina
	Report	Bilbija 18'; Stevanović 38', 75'

Stadio Olimpico, Serravalle
Attendance: 250
Referee: Eiko Saar (Estonia)

9 August 2011
20:15 CEST

Germany	4–1	Cyprus
Holtby 9', 36'; Didavi 66'; Draxler 75'	Report	Mitidis 39'

Wildparkstadion, Karlsruhe
Attendance: 8,720
Referee: Antti Munukka (Finland)
10 August 2011
18:30 CEST

Greece	2–3	Belarus
Potouridis 38' (pen.); Fortounis 87'	Report	Khlebosolov 13', 90+4' (pen.); Patotski 18'

Zosimades Stadium, Ioannina
Attendance: 1,000
Referee: Paolo Valeri (Italy)

1 September 2011
17:45 CEST

Germany	7–0	San Marino
Lasogga 2', 43'; Holtby 41'; Mlapa 47'; Ginczek 63'; Esswein 66'; Beister 74'	Report

Energieteam Arena, Paderborn
Attendance: 5,227
Referee: Thorvaldur Árnason (Iceland)
2 September 2011
16:30 CEST

Belarus	1–1	Bosnia and Herzegovina
Kuzmyanok 16'	Report	Višća 14'

City Stadium, Borisov
Attendance: 1,900
Referee: Oliver Drachta (Austria)
2 September 2011
18:00 CEST

Cyprus	0–2	Greece
	Report	Economides 58' (o.g.); Vellios 90+3'

Dasaki Stadium, Akhna
Attendance: 187
Referee: Alan Black (Northern Ireland)

6 September 2011
18:15 CEST

Belarus	0–1	Germany
	Report	Esswein 29'

City Stadium, Borisov
Attendance: 3,200
Referee: Antonio Mateu Lahoz (Spain)

6 October 2011
17:00 CEST

Greece	2–0	San Marino
Mavrias 24', 62'	Report

Peristeri Stadium, Athens
Attendance: 328
Referee: Vadims Direktorenko (Latvia)
6 October 2011
20:00 CEST

Germany	3–0	Bosnia and Herzegovina
Mlapa 20'; Neumann 40'; Holtby 88'	Report

Sportpark, Ingolstadt
Attendance: 4,192
Referee: Anar Salmanov (Azerbaijan)
7 October 2011
14:30 CEST

Cyprus	1–3	Belarus
Mitidis 15'	Report	Christofides 26' (o.g.); Patotski 41'; Khlebosolov 88'

Ammochostos Stadium, Larnaca
Attendance: 400
Referee: Dimitar Meckarovski (Macedonia)

10 October 2011
20:15 CEST

San Marino	0–8	Germany
	Report	Mlapa 3', 5', 30'; Leitner 20'; Beister 45+1'; Esswein 58', 76'; Ginczek 74'

Stadio Olimpico, Serravalle
Attendance: 250
Referee: Veaceslav Banari (Moldova)
11 October 2011
17:00 CEST

Bosnia and Herzegovina	5–1	Cyprus
Višća 4' (pen.); Bilbija 18'; Zakarić 25'; Antoniades 41' (o.g.); Stevanović 68'	Report	Pittaras 56' (pen.)

Bilino Polje, Zenica
Attendance: 100
Referee: Christof Dierick (Belgium)
11 October 2011
18:00 CEST

Belarus	1–3	Greece
Patotski 40'	Report	Lebedzew 56' (o.g.); Potouridis 67'; Vellios 68'

City Stadium, Borisov
Attendance: 1,000
Referee: Artyom Kuchin (Kazakhstan)

11 November 2011
17:45 CET

Greece	4–5	Germany
Petsos 22', 62'; Fortounis 45+3'; Vlachodimos 90+3'	Report	Mlapa 28', 45+1', 90+5'; Esswein 56'; Bell 87'

Asteras Tripolis Stadium, Tripoli
Attendance: 2,250
Referee: Ruddy Buquet (France)
11 November 2011
20:30 CET

San Marino	0–2	Belarus
	Report	Khlebosolov 34' (pen.); Kuhan 54'

Stadio Olimpico, Serravalle
Attendance: 300
Referee: Suren Baliyan (Armenia)
12 November 2011
13:30 CET

Cyprus	2–1	Bosnia and Herzegovina
Mitidis 66'; Brekalo 89' (o.g.)	Report	Stevanović 47'

Dasaki Stadium, Akhna
Attendance: 120
Referee: Yuriy Mozharovsky (Ukraine)

14 November 2011
16:00 CET

Greece	0–1	Bosnia and Herzegovina
	Report	Višća 67'

Asteras Tripolis Stadium, Tripoli
Attendance: 854
Referee: Radek Příhoda (Czech Republic)
15 November 2011
17:45 CET

Cyprus	0–3	Germany
	Report	Lasogga 19'; Gündoğan 72'; Beister 90'

Paralimni Stadium, Paralimni
Attendance: 150
Referee: David Mckeon (Ireland)

29 February 2012
18:15 CET

Germany	1–0	Greece
Funk 45+1'	Report

Erdgas Sportpark, Halle
Attendance: 6,193
Referee: Danny Makkelie (Netherlands)
29 February 2012
20:30 CET

San Marino	1–2	Cyprus
Battistini 48'	Report	Killas 42'; Alkiviadou 90+4'

Stadio Olimpico, Serravalle
Attendance: 203
Referee: Enea Jorgji (Albania)

1 June 2012
20:00 CEST

Bosnia and Herzegovina	3–0	Belarus
Bilbija 52', 76' (pen.); Đurić 90'	Report

Stadion Grbavica, Sarajevo
Attendance: 7,000
Referee: Ken Henry Johnsen (Norway)
1 June 2012
20:30 CEST

San Marino	0–0	Greece
	Report

Stadio Olimpico, Serravalle
Attendance: 287
Referee: Aleksander Gauzer (Kazakhstan)

6 June 2012
17:00 CEST

Bosnia and Herzegovina	3–1	San Marino
Bešić 4'; Đurić 54'; Stevanović 75'	Report	Battistini 56'

Asim Ferhatović Hase Stadium, Sarajevo
Attendance: 1,500
Referee: Clayton Pisani (Malta)

15 August 2012
17:00 CEST

Belarus	0–3	Cyprus
	Report	Englezou 13'; Mitidis 50'; Kurlovich 73' (o.g.)

Dinamo-Yuni Stadium, Minsk
Attendance: 370
Referee: Adrien Jaccottet (Switzerland)

7 September 2012
17:00 CEST

Bosnia and Herzegovina	4–0	Greece
Bilbija 8', 11'; Bešić 15'; Đurić 16'	Report

Asim Ferhatović Hase Stadium, Sarajevo
Attendance: 700
Referee: István Kovács (Romania)
7 September 2012
18:00 CEST

Germany	3–0	Belarus
Beister 58'; Leitner 64' (pen.); Polter 75'	Report

DKB-Arena, Rostock
Attendance: 5,732
Referee: Miroslav Zelinka (Czech Republic)

10 September 2012
17:00 CEST

Belarus	1–0	San Marino
Anyukevich 79'	Report

City Stadion, Borisov
Attendance: 500
Referee: Georgi Vadachkoria (Georgia)
10 September 2012
17:00 CEST

Greece	1–0	Cyprus
Potouridis 64'	Report

Peristeri Stadium, Athens
Attendance: 216
Referee: Ognjen Valjić (Bosnia and Herzegovina)
10 September 2012
17:00 CEST

Bosnia and Herzegovina	4–4	Germany
Đurić 11', 23', 38'; Grahovac 74'	Report	Kirchhoff 21'; Polter 59', 87'; Leitner 65'

Asim Ferhatović Hase Stadium, Sarajevo
Attendance: 3,120
Referee: Aleksei Eskov (Russia)

== Goalscorers ==
8 goals

- (Germany) Peniel Mlapa

6 goals

- (Bosnia and Herzegovina) Nemanja Bilbija
- (Bosnia and Herzegovina) Milan Đurić

5 goals

- (Bosnia and Herzegovina) Miroslav Stevanović
- (Germany) Alexander Esswein

4 goals

- (Belarus) Dmitri Khlebosolov
- (Cyprus) Nestoras Mitidis
- (Germany) Maximilian Beister
- (Germany) Lewis Holtby

3 goals

- (Belarus) Aleh Patotski
- (Bosnia and Herzegovina) Edin Višća
- (Cyprus) Marcos Michael
- (Germany) Pierre-Michel Lasogga
- (Germany) Moritz Leitner
- (Germany) Sebastian Polter
- (Greece) Giannis Potouridis

2 goals

- (Bosnia and Herzegovina) Muhamed Bešić
- (Germany) Daniel Ginczek
- (Greece) Kostas Fortounis
- (Greece) Charalampos Mavrias
- (Greece) Athanasios Petsos
- (Greece) Apostolos Vellios
- (San Marino) Manuel Battistini

1 goal

- (Belarus) Alyaksandr Anyukevich
- (Belarus) Alyaksandr Kuhan
- (Belarus) Ihar Kuzmyanok
- (Bosnia and Herzegovina) Srđan Grahovac
- (Bosnia and Herzegovina) Goran Zakarić
- (Cyprus) Andreas Alkiviadou
- (Cyprus) Stelios Demetriou
- (Cyprus) Charalambos Dimosthenous
- (Cyprus) Nikos Englezou
- (Cyprus) Nicolas Killas
- (Cyprus) Andreas Pittaras
- (Cyprus) Valentinos Sielis
- (Germany) Stefan Bell
- (Germany) Daniel Didavi
- (Germany) Julian Draxler
- (Germany) Patrick Funk
- (Germany) İlkay Gündoğan
- (Germany) Jan Kirchhoff
- (Germany) Sebastian Neumann
- (Greece) Panagiotis Vlachodimos

1 own goal

- (Belarus) Vadim Kurlovich (playing against Cyprus)
- (Belarus) Andrey Lebedzew (playing against Greece)
- (Bosnia and Herzegovina) Slavko Brekalo (playing against Cyprus)
- (Cyprus) Marios Antoniades (playing against Bosnia and Herzegovina)
- (Cyprus) Andreas Christofides (playing against Belarus)
- (Cyprus) Giorgos Economides (playing against Greece)
