= 2011 FC BATE Borisov season =

BATE Borisov
2011 season
- Manager: Viktor Goncharenko
- Stadium: Haradski Stadium (Home stadium); Dinamo Stadium (Note: From the play-off round of the UEFA Europa League and the third qualifying round of the UEFA Champions League, the club hosted its matches at Dinamo Stadium in Minsk instead of its regular venue, Haradski Stadium in Borisov, which did not meet UEFA requirements.) (Temporary stadium)
- Belarusian Premier League: 1st
- 2011–12 Belarusian Cup: Round of 16
- Belarusian Super Cup: Winners
- 2010–11 UEFA Europa League: Round of 32
- 2011–12 UEFA Champions League: Group stage
- Top goalscorer: League: Renan Bressan (13)
- Biggest win: 7–0 v Gorodeya (Away, 22 July 2011, 2011–12 Belarusian Cup)
- Biggest defeat: 0–5 v Barcelona (Home, 28 September 2011, 2011–12 UEFA Champions League)
Home colours	Away colours

The 2011 season was Football Club BATE Borisov's 14th consecutive season in the Belarusian Premier League. In addition to the domestic league, BATE Borisov participated in the 2011–12 Belarusian Cup, the Belarusian Super Cup, the 2010–11 UEFA Europa League and the 2011–12 UEFA Champions League.

== Squad ==
Squad at end of season

Note: Flags indicate national team as defined under FIFA eligibility rules; some limited exceptions apply. Players may hold more than one non-FIFA nationality.

No.	Pos.	Nation	Player
2	MF	BLR	Dzmitry Likhtarovich
4	DF	BLR	Igor Shitov
5	DF	BLR	Alyaksandr Yurevich
6	MF	BLR	Aleh Patotski
7	FW	BLR	Artem Kontsevoy
8	MF	BLR	Alyaksandr Valadzko
9	FW	BRA	Alex Porfirio
10	MF	BRA	Renan Bressan
11	MF	BLR	Mikhail Gordeychuk
13	MF	BLR	Pavel Nyakhaychyk
14	DF	BLR	Artsyom Radzkow
15	FW	BLR	Maksim Skavysh
16	GK	BLR	Andrey Shcharbakow
17	MF	BLR	Alyaksandr Pawlaw
18	DF	BLR	Maksim Bordachyov

No.	Pos.	Nation	Player
19	MF	BLR	Kirill Aleksiyan
20	FW	BLR	Vitali Rodionov
21	DF	BLR	Yegor Filipenko
22	DF	SRB	Marko Simić
23	MF	BLR	Edgar Olekhnovich
24	DF	BLR	Yawhen Kuntsevich
25	MF	BLR	Dmitry Baga
26	MF	BLR	Vadim Kurlovich
28	MF	BLR	Syarhey Hlyabko
29	MF	BLR	Maksim Valadzko
30	GK	BLR	Alyaksandr Hutar
33	GK	UKR	Dmytro Ivanov
35	GK	BLR	Pavel Chasnowski
77	MF	BLR	Filipp Rudik
99	FW	SRB	Mateja Kežman

== Competitions ==
=== Overview ===
Competition	First match	Last match	Starting round	Final position	Record							
Competition	First match	Last match	Starting round	Final position	Pld	W	D	L	GF	GA	GD	Win %
Belarusian Premier League	2 April 2011	27 November 2011	Matchday 1	Winners	33	18	12	3	53	20	+33	54.55
2011–12 Belarusian Cup	22 July 2011	13 November 2011	Round of 32	Round of 16	2	1	0	1	8	3	+5	50.00
Belarusian Super Cup	27 February 2011		Final	Winners	1	1	0	0	3	0	+3	100.00
2010–11 UEFA Europa League	17 February 2011	24 February 2011	Progressed	Round of 32	2	0	2	0	2	2	+0	0.00
2011–12 UEFA Champions League	13 July 2011	6 December 2011	Second qualifying round	Group stage	12	3	5	4	11	17	−6	25.00
Total					50	23	19	8	77	42	+35	46.00

Source: Competitions

=== Belarusian Premier League ===
==== League table ====
Pos	Team	Pld	W	D	L	GF	GA	GD	Pts	Qualification or relegation
1	BATE Borisov (C)	33	18	12	3	53	20	+33	66	Qualification for Champions League second qualifying round
2	Shakhtyor Soligorsk	33	17	10	6	46	24	+22	61	Qualification for Europa League second qualifying round
3	Gomel	33	13	15	5	36	24	+12	54	Qualification for Europa League first qualifying round
4	Dinamo Minsk	33	14	7	12	50	43	+7	49	
5	Belshina Bobruisk	33	12	12	9	41	35	+6	48	

Source: football.by
Rules for classification: 1st points; 2nd matches won; 3rd head-to-head (points, matches won, goal difference, goals scored); 4th goal difference; 5th goals scored
(C) Champions

==== Results summary ====
Overall								Home						Away					
Pld	W	D	L	GF	GA	GD	Pts	W	D	L	GF	GA	GD	W	D	L	GF	GA	GD
33	18	12	3	53	20	+33	66	9	7	1	31	14	+17	9	5	2	22	6	+16

Source: Soccerway

==== Results by round ====
Round	1	2	3	4	5	6	7	8	9	10	11	12	13	14	15	16	17	18	19	20	21	22	23	24	25	26	27	28	29	30	31	32	33
Ground	H	H	A	H	A	H	A	H	A	H	A	A	A	H	A	H	A	H	A	H	A	H	H	A	H	A	H	A	H	H	A	H	A
Result	D	W	D	W	W	W	W	W	W	D	D	W	W	W	L	W	W	D	W	W	L	D	D	D	W	D	D	W	W	D	W	L	D
Position	5	5	5	2	1	1	1	1	1	1	1	1	1	1	1	1	1	1	1	1	1	1	1	1	1	1	1	1	1	1	1	1	1
Points	1	4	5	8	11	14	17	20	23	24	25	28	31	34	34	37	40	41	44	47	47	48	49	50	53	54	55	58	61	62	65	65	66

Source: Worldfootball.net
A = Away; H = Home; W = Win; D = Draw; L = Loss

==== Matches ====
2 April 2011 1	BATE Borisov	1–1	Neman Grodno	Borisov
16:00 FET (UTC+3)	Shitov 15'	Report	Rybak 44'	Stadium: Haradski Stadium

6 April 2011 2	BATE Borisov	1–0	Naftan Novopolotsk	Borisov
17:00 FET (UTC+3)	Bressan 84'	Report		Stadium: Haradski Stadium

10 April 2011 3	Dnepr Mogilev	1–1	BATE Borisov	Mogilev
16:00 FET (UTC+3)	Matveyenko 5'; Raspopov (red card) 67'	Report	Radzkow (red card) 52'; Gordeychuk 86'	Stadium: Spartak Stadium

15 April 2011 4	BATE Borisov	1–0	Dinamo Minsk	Borisov
19:00 FET (UTC+3)	Bressan 1'	Report		Stadium: Haradski Stadium

19 April 2011 5	Dinamo Brest	0–3	BATE Borisov	Brest
18:00 FET (UTC+3)	Klimovich (red card) 59'	Report	Pankavets 24', 57' (o.g.); Baga 41'	Stadium: OSK Brestskiy

23 April 2011 6	BATE Borisov	1–0	Torpedo-BelAZ Zhodino	Borisov
18:00 FET (UTC+3)	Simić 38'	Report		Stadium: Haradski Stadium

30 April 2011 7	Shakhtyor Soligorsk	0–2	BATE Borisov	Soligorsk
16:00 FET (UTC+3)	Razhkow (red card) 77'	Report	Bressan 36'; Nyakhaychyk 71'	Stadium: Stroitel Stadium

7 May 2011 8	BATE Borisov	4–1	Vitebsk	Borisov
18:00 FET (UTC+3)	Nyakhaychyk 10', 90'; Skavysh 39', 76'	Report	Sļesarčuks 57'	Stadium: Haradski Stadium

11 May 2011 9	Belshina Bobruisk	0–2	BATE Borisov	Bobruisk
17:00 FET (UTC+3)		Report	Simić 55', 86'	Stadium: Spartak Stadium

15 May 2011 10	BATE Borisov	1–1	Minsk	Borisov
19:30 FET (UTC+3)	Kontsevoy 79'	Report	Soro 74'	Stadium: Haradski Stadium

21 May 2011 11	Gomel	0–0	BATE Borisov	Gomel
17:00 FET (UTC+3)		Report		Stadium: Central Stadium

25 May 2011 12	Neman Grodno	0–3	BATE Borisov	Grodno
18:00 FET (UTC+3)		Report	Nadziewski 18' (o.g.); Filipenko 45'; Baga 69'	Stadium: Neman Stadium

12 June 2011 13	Naftan Novopolotsk	0–2	BATE Borisov	Novopolotsk
17:00 FET (UTC+3)		Report	Shitov 4'; Radzkow 10'	Stadium: Atlant Stadium

19 June 2011 14	BATE Borisov	5–0	Dnepr Mogilev	Borisov
18:00 FET (UTC+3)	Rudik 8'; Kontsevoy 19', 66'; Patotski 34'; Bressan 48'	Report		Stadium: Haradski Stadium

24 June 2011 15	Dinamo Minsk	2–0	BATE Borisov	Minsk
18:00 FET (UTC+3)	Afanasyev 45'; Leonardo 90'	Report	Simić (red card) 10'	Stadium: Dinamo Stadium

29 June 2011 18	BATE Borisov	2–2	Shakhtyor Soligorsk	Borisov
18:00 FET (UTC+3)	Filipenko 29'; Bressan 52'; Pawlaw (yellow card) (yellow-red card) 89'	Report	Sitko 27', 46'	Stadium: Haradski Stadium

3 July 2011 16	BATE Borisov	2–0	Dinamo Brest	Borisov
18:00 FET (UTC+3)	Nyakhaychyk 34', 38'	Report		Stadium: Haradski Stadium

8 July 2011 17	Torpedo-BelAZ Zhodino	0–3	BATE Borisov	Zhodino
17:00 FET (UTC+3)		Report	Pawlaw 25'; Nyakhaychyk 42', 52'	Stadium: Torpedo Stadium

29 July 2011 19	Vitebsk	0–1	BATE Borisov	Vitebsk
17:00 FET (UTC+3)		Report	Rodionov 50'	Stadium: Vitebsky Central Sport Complex

7 August 2011 20	BATE Borisov	1–0	Belshina Bobruisk	Borisov
19:30 FET (UTC+3)	Kontsevoy 73'	Report		Stadium: Haradski Stadium

12 August 2011 21	Minsk	1–0	BATE Borisov	Minsk
17:00 FET (UTC+3)	Vasilyuk 88'	Report		Stadium: Torpedo Stadium

20 August 2011 22	BATE Borisov	1–1	Gomel	Borisov
18:00 FET (UTC+3)	Rodionov 24'	Report	Aleksiyevich 9'	Stadium: Haradski Stadium

28 August 2011 23	BATE Borisov	2–2	Dinamo Minsk	Borisov
19:30 FET (UTC+3)	Rodionov 67'; Filipenko 75'; Hutar (yellow card) (yellow-red card) 81'	Report	Furlan 49' (pen.), 73'	Stadium: Haradski Stadium

9 September 2011 24	Shakhtyor Soligorsk	0–0	BATE Borisov	Soligorsk
19:00 FET (UTC+3)		Report		Stadium: Stroitel Stadium

18 September 2011 25	BATE Borisov	2–0	Naftan Novopolotsk	Borisov
18:00 FET (UTC+3)	Bressan 26', 40'	Report		Stadium: Haradski Stadium

23 September 2011 26	Belshina Bobruisk	1–1	BATE Borisov	Bobruisk
15:30 FET (UTC+3)	Zubovich 46'	Report	Kontsevoy 6'	Stadium: Spartak Stadium

2 October 2011 27	BATE Borisov	0–0	Gomel	Borisov
16:00 FET (UTC+3)		Report		Stadium: Haradski Stadium

14 October 2011 28	Minsk	0–2	BATE Borisov	Minsk
13:00 FET (UTC+3)	Pavlyuchek (red card) 87'	Report	Lashankow 17' (o.g.); Bressan 68'	Stadium: Torpedo Stadium

23 October 2011 29	BATE Borisov	4–2	Torpedo-BelAZ Zhodino	Borisov
17:00 FET (UTC+3)	Skavysh 3'; Bressan 10', 59'; Valadzko 41'	Report	Salavey 34', 73'	Stadium: Haradski Stadium

27 October 2011 30	BATE Borisov	2–2	Vitebsk	Borisov
17:00 FET (UTC+3)	Bressan 56'; Kontsevoy 89'	Report	Sļesarčuks 4', 40'	Stadium: Haradski Stadium

6 November 2011 31	Neman Grodno	0–1	BATE Borisov	Grodno
15:00 FET (UTC+3)		Report	Pawlaw 66'	Stadium: Neman Stadium

19 November 2011 32	BATE Borisov	1–2	Dnepr Mogilev	Borisov
12:00 FET (UTC+3)	Bressan 28'	Report	Zenkovich 15'; Shramchenko 30'	Stadium: Haradski Stadium

27 November 2011 33	Dinamo Brest	1–1	BATE Borisov	Brest
12:00 FET (UTC+3)	David 29'	Report	Bressan 58'	Stadium: OSK Brestskiy

=== 2011–12 Belarusian Cup ===
22 July 2011 Round of 32	Gorodeya	0–7	BATE Borisov	Gorodeya
17:00 FET (UTC+3)		Report	Rudik 8'; Rodionov 12', 21', 24'; Skavysh 57', 80'; Aleksiyan 65'	Stadium: Gorodeya Stadium

13 November 2011 Round of 16	Dinamo Brest	3–1	BATE Borisov	Brest
12:00 FET (UTC+3)	Tsevan 29'; Yanush 32'; Klopotskiy 87'	Report	Kontsevoy 7'	Stadium: OSK Brestskiy

=== Belarusian Super Cup ===
In the 2011 Belarusian Super Cup, BATE Borisov, as the previous season's Belarusian Premier League winners and holders of the 2009–10 Belarusian Cup, faced Torpedo-BelAZ Zhodino, who qualified as runners-up of that competition.

27 February 2011 Final	BATE Borisov	3–0	Torpedo-BelAZ Zhodino	Minsk
16:00 EET (UTC+2)	Baga 30'; Bressan 86'; Nyakhaychyk 90'	Report		Stadium: Dinamo Stadium

=== 2010–11 UEFA Europa League ===
The competition continued from the 2010 season.

==== Knockout phase ====
===== Round of 32 =====
17 February 2011 First leg	BATE Borisov (Belarus)	2–2	(France) Paris Saint-Germain	Minsk, Belarus
20:00 EET (UTC+2)	Bressan 16'; Gordeychuk 80'	Report	Erdinç 29'; Clément (yellow card) 36'; Luyindula 89'	Stadium: Dinamo Stadium; Attendance: 6,080; Referee: Alon Yefet (Israel); Assistant referees: Danny Krasikow (Israel), Shabtai Nahmias (Israel); Fourth official: Eitan Shmuelevitz (Israel); Goal-line assistants: Liran Liany (Israel), Eli Hacmon (Israel)

24 February 2011 Second leg	Paris Saint-Germain (France)	0–0 ((a) 2–2 agg.)	(Belarus) BATE Borisov	Paris, France
21:05 CET (UTC+1)	Clément (yellow card) 14'; Camara (yellow card) 75'	Report	Shitov (yellow card) 21'; Nyakhaychyk (yellow card) 56'	Stadium: Parc des Princes; Attendance: 17,717; Referee: Kevin Blom (Netherlands); Assistant referees: Nicky Siebert (Netherlands), Patrick Langkamp (Netherlands); Fourth official: Bas Nijhuis (Netherlands); Goal-line assistants: Tom van Sichem (Netherlands), Reinold Wiedemeijer (Netherlands)
Note: 2–2 on aggregate. Paris Saint-Germain won on away goals.

=== 2011–12 UEFA Champions League ===
==== Qualifying rounds ====
===== Second qualifying round =====
13 July 2011 First leg	Linfield (Northern Ireland)	1–1	(Belarus) BATE Borisov	Belfast, Northern Ireland
19:45 BST (UTC+1)	Fordyce 5'; Armstrong (yellow card) 37'	Report	Bressan 37' (pen.)	Stadium: Windsor Park; Attendance: 1,212; Referee: Paweł Gil (Poland); Assistant referees: Piotr Sadczuk (Poland), Marcin Borkowski (Poland); Fourth official: Robert Małek (Poland)

19 July 2011 Second leg	BATE Borisov (Belarus)	2–0 (3–1 agg.)	(Northern Ireland) Linfield	Borisov, Belarus
19:00 FET (UTC+3)	Nyakhaychyk (yellow card) 10', (goal) 58'; Kontsevoy (yellow card) 29'; Yurevich (yellow card) 40'; Pawlaw 61'	Report	Fordyce (yellow card) 32'	Stadium: Haradski Stadium; Attendance: 5,200; Referee: Libor Kovařík (Czech Republic); Assistant referees: Patrik Filipek (Czech Republic), Krystof Mencl (Czech Republic); Fourth official: Radek Příhoda (Czech Republic)
Note: BATE Borisov won 3–1 on aggregate.

===== Third qualifying round =====
26 July 2011 First leg	Ekranas (Lithuania)	0–0	(Belarus) BATE Borisov	Panevėžys, Lithuania
19:00 EEST (UTC+3)	Radavičius (yellow card) 48'; Anđelković (red card) 58'; Zubas (yellow card) 90+3'	Report	Kontsevoy (yellow card) 63'; Olekhnovich (yellow card) 90'; Gordeychuk (yellow card) 90+4'	Stadium: Aukštaitija Stadium; Attendance: 2,989; Referee: Deniz Aytekin (Germany); Assistant referees: Stefan Lupp (Germany), Christian Leicher (Germany); Fourth official: Markus Schmidt (Germany)

2 August 2011 Second leg	BATE Borisov (Belarus)	3–1 (3–1 agg.)	(Lithuania) Ekranas	Borisov, Belarus
19:00 FET (UTC+3)	Rodionov 18'; Bressan 35', (yellow card) 35' (yellow-red card) 40'; Shitov (yellow card) 63'; Gordeychuk 89'	Report	Velička 22'; Dedura (yellow card) 44'; Samusiovas (yellow card) 89'	Stadium: Haradski Stadium; Attendance: 5,360; Referee: Hüseyin Göçek (Turkey); Assistant referees: Baki Tuncay Akkin (Turkey), Erdinç Sezertam (Turkey); Fourth official: Özgür Yankaya (Turkey)
Note: BATE Borisov won 3–1 on aggregate.

==== Play-off round ====
16 August 2011 First leg	BATE Borisov (Belarus)	1–1	(Austria) Sturm Graz	Minsk, Belarus
21:45 FET (UTC+3)	Rodionov (yellow card) 14'; Simić 59'; Rudik (yellow card) 74'	Report	Weber 12'; Säumel (yellow card) 52'	Stadium: Dinamo Stadium; Attendance: 15,550; Referee: Svein Oddvar Moen (Norway); Assistant referees: Dag-Roger Nebben (Norway), Kim Thomas Haglund (Norway); Fourth official: Svein-Erik Edvartsen (Norway); Goal-line assistants: Espen Berntsen (Norway), Brage Sandmoen (Norway)

24 August 2011 Second leg	Sturm Graz (Austria)	0–2 (1–3 agg.)	(Belarus) BATE Borisov	Graz, Austria
20:45 CEST (UTC+2)	Standfest (yellow card) 29'; Wolf (yellow card) 42'	Report	Valadzko (yellow card) 21', (goal) 36'; Simić (yellow card) 31', (goal) 70'; Rodionov (yellow card) 54'; Baga (yellow card) 65'	Stadium: UPC-Arena; Attendance: 14,528; Referee: Jonas Eriksson (Sweden); Assistant referees: Stefan Wittberg (Sweden), Mathias Klasenius (Sweden); Fourth official: Martin Strömbergsson (Sweden); Goal-line assistants: Daniel Stålhammar (Sweden), Tobias Mattsson (Sweden)
Note: BATE Borisov won 3–1 on aggregate.

==== Group stage ====
Pos	Team	Pld	W	D	L	GF	GA	GD	Pts	Qualification	BAR	MIL	PLZ	BATE
1	(Spain) Barcelona	6	5	1	0	20	4	+16	16	Advance to knockout phase	—	2–2	2–0	4–0
2	(Italy) Milan	6	2	3	1	11	8	+3	9	Advance to knockout phase	2–3	—	2–0	2–0
3	(Czech Republic) Viktoria Plzeň	6	1	2	3	4	11	−7	5	Transfer to Europa League	0–4	2–2	—	1–1
4	(Belarus) BATE Borisov	6	0	2	4	2	14	−12	2		0–5	1–1	0–1	—

Source: Soccerway

13 September 2011 1	Viktoria Plzeň (Czech Republic)	1–1	(Belarus) BATE Borisov	Prague, Czech Republic (Note: The match was played at the Synot Tip Arena in Prague, instead of Viktoria Plzeň regular stadium, the Stadion města Plzně in Plzeň, which did not meet UEFA requirements.)
20:45 CEST (UTC+2)	Bakoš 45+1'; Kolář (yellow card) 63'; Pilař (yellow card) 81'	Report	Olekhnovich (yellow card) 15'; Bressan 69', (yellow card) 71'	Stadium: Synot Tip Arena; Attendance: 19,541; Referee: Laurent Duhamel (France); Assistant referees: Michael Annonier (France), Christophe Capelli (France); Fourth official: Pascal Vileo (France); Goal-line assistants: Wilfried Bien (France), Nicolas Rainville (France)

28 September 2011 2	BATE Borisov (Belarus)	0–5	(Spain) Barcelona	Minsk, Belarus
21:45 FET (UTC+3)	Simić (yellow card) 81'	Report	Valadzko 19' (o.g.); Pedro 22'; Messi 38', 56'; Dani Alves (yellow card) 77'; Villa 90'	Stadium: Dinamo Stadium; Attendance: 29,555; Referee: Manuel Gräfe (Germany); Assistant referees: Markus Häcke (Germany), Guido Kleve (Germany); Fourth official: Guido Winkmann (Germany); Goal-line assistants: Babak Rafati (Germany), Peter Sippel (Germany)

19 October 2011 3	Milan (Italy)	2–0	(Belarus) BATE Borisov	Milan, Italy
20:45 CEST (UTC+2)	Ibrahimović 33'; Nocerino (yellow card) 39'; Boateng 70'	Report	Bordachyov (yellow card) 42'; Simić (yellow card) 44'	Stadium: San Siro; Attendance: 66,040; Referee: Tom Harald Hagen (Norway); Assistant referees: Dag-Roger Nebben (Norway), Frank Andås (Norway); Fourth official: Svein-Erik Edvartsen (Norway); Goal-line assistants: Espen Berntsen (Norway), Brage Sandmoen (Norway)

1 November 2011 4	BATE Borisov (Belarus)	1–1	(Italy) Milan	Minsk, Belarus
20:00 FET (UTC+3)	Bressan 55' (pen.); Olekhnovich (yellow card) 100'	Report	Ibrahimović 22'; Ambrosini (yellow card) 83'	Stadium: Dinamo Stadium; Attendance: 29,100; Referee: Peter Rasmussen (Denmark); Assistant referees: Henrik Sønderby (Denmark), Anders Nørrestrand (Denmark); Fourth official: Lars Christoffersen (Denmark); Goal-line assistants: Jakob Kehlet (Denmark), Kenn Hansen (Denmark)

23 November 2011 5	BATE Borisov (Belarus)	0–1	(Czech Republic) Viktoria Plzeň	Minsk, Belarus
21:00 FET (UTC+3)	Pawlaw (yellow card) 62'	Report	Bystroň (yellow card) 35'; Bakoš 42', (yellow card) 72'	Stadium: Dinamo Stadium; Attendance: 26,520; Referee: Kevin Blom (Netherlands); Assistant referees: Nicky Siebert (Netherlands), Patrick Langkamp (Netherlands); Fourth official: Tom van Sichem (Netherlands); Goal-line assistants: Danny Makkelie (Netherlands), Peter Janssen (Netherlands)

6 December 2011 6	Barcelona (Spain)	4–0	(Belarus) BATE Borisov	Barcelona, Spain
20:45 CET (UTC+1)	Roberto 35'; Montoya 60'; Pedro 63', 89' (pen.)	Report	Yurevich (yellow card) 44'	Stadium: Camp Nou; Attendance: 37,374; Referee: William Collum (Scotland); Assistant referees: George Drummond (Scotland), Martin Cryans (Scotland); Fourth official: Iain Brines (Scotland); Goal-line assistants: Alan Muir (Scotland), Bobby Madden (Scotland)
