= Evgeni Lebedev =

Evgeni Lebedev (also, Yevgeny, Yevgeni, Yevgeniy, etc.) may refer to:

- Evgeny Lebedev (born 1980), Russian-British businessman
- Yawhen Lebedzew (born 1994), Belarusian footballer
- Yevgeni Lebedev (1917–1997), Russian actor, People's Artist of the USSR
- Yevgeny Lebedev (politician) (born 1957), Russian politician
- Yevgeniy Lebedev (born 1981), Russian sprint athlete
- Yevhen Lebedyev (1941–2018), Ukrainian chemist

== See also ==
- Yevgeny, Yevhen, Yawhen
- Lebedev, Lebedzew, Lebedyev
