= Lebedev =

Lebedev (Russian: Ле́бедев), or Lebedeva (feminine; Ле́бедева) is a common Russian family name derived from the word лебедь (lebed, meaning "swan"). Its Ukrainian equivalent is Lebedyev, Belarusian: Lebedzew. Notable persons with the surname include:

- Alexander Lebedev (born 1959), Russian businessman and politician
- Aleksandr Lebedev (biochemist), Russian biochemist
- Alexander Pavlovich Lebedev (1918–1943), Soviet army officer and Hero of the Soviet Union
- Alexey Lebedev (1924–1993), Russian tubist and composer
- Aleksey Vladimirovich Lebedev (born 1973), Russian scriptwriter and director. Main scriptwriter of the Kikoriki series.
- Alina Lebedeva (born 1985), attacked Prince Charles of the United Kingdom in 2001
- Andžejs Ļebedevs (born 4 November 1994), Latvian speedway rider
- Andrey Lebedev (art historian) (1908–1993)
- Andrey Lebedev (footballer) (b. 1963), Soviet and Russian footballer
- Andrey Lebedzew (b. 1991), Belarusian footballer
- Artemy Lebedev (born 1975), Russian graphic designer and founder of Art. Lebedev Studio
- Arthur Lebedev (born 1936), Russian neurophysiologist
- Denis Lebedev (born 1979), Russian boxer
- Dmitri Lebedev (businessman) (born 1968), CEO of Rossiya Bank
- Dmitri Lebedev (general) (1872–1935), Russian Estonian military commander, general
- Dzmitry Lebedzew (born 1986), Belarusian footballer
- Evgeni Lebedev may have different transliterations:
- Evgeny Lebedev (born 1980), Russian-British businessman
- Yawhen Lebedzew (born 1994), Belarusian footballer
- Yevgeni Lebedev (1917–1997), Russian actor, People's Artist of the USSR
- Yevgeny Lebedev (politician) (born 1957), Russian politician
- Yevgeniy Lebedev (born 1981), Russian sprint athlete
- Yevhen Lebedyev (1941–2018), Ukrainian chemist
- Gennady Lebedev (1957–2004), Russian economist, businessman and politician
- Gerasim Lebedev (1749–1817), Russian Indologist
- Ivan Aleksandrovich Lebedev ( 1856 or 1861 – after 1917), Russian judge and politician
- Ivan Lebedeff (1894–1953), Russian-American film actor
- Ivan Lebedev a.k.a. Jean Lébédeff, (1884–1972), Russian-French painter and printmaker
- Ivan Lebedev (1850–1905), Russian naval officer
- Ivan Lebedev (wrestler) (1879–1950), Russian and Soviet professional wrestler
- Ivan Rom-Lebedev (1903–1991), Russian Romani actor, musician, and writer
- Kirill Lebedev (1991–2025), Russian ice hockey player
- Klavdy Lebedev (1852–1916), Russian painter
- Konstantin Lebedev (1910–1949), Soviet soldier and Hero of the Soviet Union
- Natalya Lebedeva (born 1949), Russian athlete
- Nikolai Alexandrovich Lebedev (1914–1942), Soviet army officer and Hero of the Soviet Union
- Nikolai Andreevich Lebedev (1919–1982), mathematician
- Pavel Lebedev (born 1982), Russian pairs figure skater
- Platon Lebedev (born 1956), Russian businessman
- Pyotr Lebedev (1866–1912), Russian physicist
- Sergey Lebedev (disambiguation) – several people
- Tatyana Lebedeva (born 1976), Russian athlete
- Valentin Lebedev (born 1942), Russian cosmonaut and double Hero of the Soviet Union
- Vasily Lebedev-Kumach (1898–1949), Russian poet
- Vladimir Lebedev (artist) (1891–1967), Russian painter and graphic artist
- Vyacheslav Lebedev (mathematician) (Vyacheslav Ivanovich Lebedev, 1930–2010), Russian mathematician
- Vyacheslav Lebedev (jurist) (Vyacheslav Mikhailovich Lebedev, 1943–2024), Russian jurist
- Vyacheslav I. Lebedev (born 1950), Russian apiologist
- Yelena Lebedeva (born 1977), Uzbekistani canoeist
- Yevgeni Lebedev, multiple persons, different transliterations possible, see Evgeni Lebedev (disambiguation)
- Yuri Lebedev (born 1951), Russian ice hockey player

== Fictional characters ==
- Juan Ivanovich Lebedev, fictional character from Deus Ex
- Lukian Timofyevich Lebedev, fictional character from Dostoevsky's novel The Idiot
- N. A. Lebedev, fictional character from S.T.A.L.K.E.R.: Clear Sky game
- Protagonists in Lebedev against Lebedev
