= Pavel Lebedev (disambiguation) =

Pavel Lebedev may refer to:

- Pavel Andreyevich Lebedev (born 1982), Russian pair skater
- Pavel Pavlovich Lebedev, Russian and Soviet military leader
- Pavlo Lebedyev, Ukrainian and Russian politician, financier and businessman

== See also ==
- Pavel, Pavlo
- Lebedev, Lebedyev
