= Yawhen =

Yawhen is a given name. Notable people with the name include:

- Yawhen Barsukow (born 1990), Belarusian professional footballer
- Yawhen Branavitski (born 1981), Belarusian professional footballer
- Yawhen Kalinin (born 1993), Belarusian professional footballer
- Yawhen Kapaw (born 1977), Belarusian professional footballer
- Yawhen Kisyalyow (born 1993), Belarusian professional footballer
- Yawhen Kuntsevich (born 1988), Belarusian professional football player
- Yawhen Lashankow (born 1979), Belarusian professional football coach and former player
- Yawhen Lebedzew (born 1994), Belarusian professional footballer
- Yawhen Linyow (born 1980), Belarusian professional football coach and former player
- Yawhen Marozaw (born 1995), Belarusian professional footballer
- Yawhen Milewsky (born 1995), Belarusian professional footballer
- Yawhen Minenkow (born 1988), Belarusian former professional footballer
- Yawhen Savastsyanaw (born 1988), Belarusian professional footballer
- Yawhen Shawchenka (born 1996), Belarusian footballer
- Yawhen Zhuk, Belarusian-Israeli professional association footballer
- Yawhen Zuew (born 1983), Belarusian former professional footballer
