= Lebedzew =

Lebedzew is a Belarusian surname, an equivalent of Russian Lebedev and Ukrainian Lebedyev. Notable people with the surname include:

- Alyaksandr Lebedzew
- Andrey Lebedzew
- Dzmitry Lebedzew
- Dzyanis Lebedzew
- Yawhen Lebedzew
