= Edeshko =

Edeshko, Yadeshka or Yadzeshka (Belarusian: Ядэшка or Ядзешка; Russian: Едешко) is a gender-neutral Belarusian surname that may refer to

- Alyaksandr Yadeshka (born 1993), Belarusian football player
- Ivan Edeshko (1945—2026), Belarusian basketball player
