= Rochev =

Rochev (Russian: Ро́чев, Belarusian: Рочаў), female form Rocheva (Russian: Ро́чева) is a slavic surname.

Notable people with this surname include:

- Isabel Rochev, character in Arrow (TV series)
- Nikita Rochev, Belarusian footballer
- Nina Rocheva, Soviet skier
- Olga Rocheva, Russian skier
- Vasily Rochev (skier, born 1951), Soviet skier
- Vasily Rochev (skier, born 1980), Soviet skier
