= Burko =

Burko is a surname. Notable people with the surname include:

- Anton Burko (born 1995), Belarusian footballer
- Diane Burko (born 1945), American painter
- Ihar Burko (born 1988), Belarusian footballer
