= Shmatko =

Shmatko (Ukrainian: Шматько) is a Ukrainian surname that may refer to

- Dzmitry Shmatko (born 1989), Belarusian football player
- Lyubov Shmatko (born 1993), Ukrainian footballer
- Mykola Shmatko (1943–2020), Ukrainian sculptor and painter
- Sergei Shmatko (1966–2021), Russian businessman and politician
- Polina Shmatko (born 2003), Russian rhythmic gymnast
