= Nikolay Strizhkov =

Belarusian footballer

Personal information
- Full name: Nikolay Nikolaevich Strizhkov
- Date of birth: 22 February 1990 (age 36)
- Place of birth: Belarus
- Position: Midfielder

Youth career
- Torpedo (Minsk)

Senior career*
Years	Team	Apps	(Gls)
2008	Klechesk	12	(0)
2010	Veras	8	(0)
2011	Kommunalnik	28	(4)
2012-2013	Smolevichi	26	(1)
2014	Alfa (Minsk)	2	(0)
2014	Ayia Napa	0	(0)
2017	Energetik-BGU	10	(0)
2018	Uzda	1	(0)
- * Club domestic league appearances and goals

Nikolay Nikolaevich Strizhkov (Russian: Николай Николаевич Стрижков; born 22 February 1990) is a Belarusian former footballer who is last known to have played as a midfielder for Uzda.

== Career ==
In 2014, Strizhkov signed for Cypriot side Ayia Napa from Alfa (Minsk) in the Belarusian third division, but left due to financial problems.

Before the 2017 season, he signed for Belarusian second division club Energetik-BGU.
