= Aleksandr Komlev =

Belarusian footballer

Personal information
- Date of birth: 26 June 1994 (age 32)
- Place of birth: Osipovichi, Mogilev Oblast, Belarus
- Height: 1.81 m (5 ft 11 1/2 in)
- Position: Forward

Youth career
- Osipovichi

Senior career*
Years	Team	Apps	(Gls)
2011–2012	Dinamo Minsk	0	(0)
2011–2012	→ Dinamo-2 Minsk	29	(5)
2012	→ Bereza-2010 (loan)	11	(0)
2013–2014	Zvezda-BGU Minsk	36	(13)
2015	Minsk	0	(0)
2015	→ Vitebsk (loan)	8	(0)
2015	→ Lida (loan)	15	(6)
2016	Dinamo Brest	12	(0)
2016	Smolevichi-STI	11	(1)
2018–2021	Osipovichi	61	(23)
- * Club domestic league appearances and goals as of 31 December 2021

Aleksandr Komlev (Belarusian: Аляксандр Комлеў; Russian: Александр Комлев; born 26 June 1994) is a Belarusian former professional footballer.

== Honours ==
Dinamo Brest

- Belarusian Cup winner: 2016–17
