= Mikalay Barsukow =

Belarusian footballer

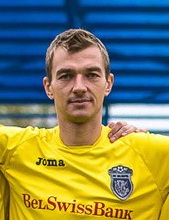

Personal information
- Full name: Mikalay Nikolai Barsukow
- Date of birth: 30 November 1982 (age 43)
- Place of birth: Minsk, Soviet Union
- Height: 1.83 m (6 ft 0 in)
- Position: Defender

Senior career*
Years	Team	Apps	(Gls)
1999–2002	Dinamo-Juni Minsk	60	(3)
2003	Dinamo Minsk	1	(0)
2003	Lokomotiv Vitebsk	15	(0)
2004	Naftan Novopolotsk	17	(0)
2005	Lokomotiv Vitebsk	25	(0)
2006–2007	Belshina Bobruisk	44	(3)
2008–2009	Smorgon	34	(0)
2009	Torpedo Zhodino	11	(0)
2010	Gomel	26	(0)
2011	Belshina Bobruisk	5	(0)
2012	Olimpia Elbląg	13	(1)
2012	ŁKS Łódź	14	(0)
2013	Vedrich-97 Rechitsa	24	(1)
2014–2015	Isloch Minsk Raion	48	(0)
- * Club domestic league appearances and goals as of 8 December 2015

Mikalay Barsukow (Belarusian: Мікалай Барсукоў; Russian: Николай Борсуков; born 30 November 1982) is a Belarusian former professional footballer who last played for Isloch Minsk Raion.
