= Yevgeniy Shidlovskiy =

Belarusian footballer

Personal information
- Date of birth: 13 January 1991 (age 35)
- Place of birth: Grodno, Byelorussian SSR, Soviet Union
- Height: 1.84 m (6 ft 1/2 in)
- Position: Midfielder

Youth career
- 2007–2010: Torpedo-BelAZ Zhodino

Senior career*
Years	Team	Apps	(Gls)
2011–2014	Torpedo-BelAZ Zhodino	4	(0)
2012	→ Lida (loan)	18	(1)
2013	→ Vitebsk (loan)	21	(1)
2014	→ Granit Mikashevichi (loan)	26	(1)
2015–2017	Gorodeya	39	(3)
2018	Lida	19	(2)
2019	Smolevichi	18	(0)

International career
2008–2009	Belarus U19		
- * Club domestic league appearances and goals as of 31 December 2019

Yevgeniy Shidlovskiy (Belarusian: Яўген Шыдлоўскi; Russian: Евгений Шидловский; born 13 January 1991) is a Belarusian former professional football player.

On 16 January 2020, the BFF banned Shidlovskiy for 12 months for his involvement in the match fixing.
