= Manuel Battistini =

Sammarinese footballer

Personal information
- Date of birth: July 22, 1994 (age 32)
- Position: Midfielder

Team information
- Current team: Virtus
- Number: 7

Senior career*
Years	Team	Apps	(Gls)
2011–2013	Tropical Coriano		
2012–2013	Cattolica		
2013-2014	Sammaurese		
2014-2015	Tropical Coriano		
2015–2019	Juvenes/Dogana	27	(1)
2017–2018	Tre Penne (loan)	14	(1)
2018–2019	Libertas (loan)	23	(1)
2019–2020	Tropical Coriano		
2020–2021	Juvenes/Dogana	0	(0)
2020–2021	→ Virtus (loan)	22	(3)
2021–	Virtus	159	(4)

International career^{‡}
2013–	San Marino	53	(0)
- * Club domestic league appearances and goals as of 5 June 2026 ‡ National team caps and goals as of 24 March 2024

Manuel Battistini (born 22 July 1994) is a Sammarinese footballer who currently plays for Virtus as a midfielder.

He has been capped by the San Marino national football team making his international debut on 11 October 2013, in a 2014 FIFA World Cup qualifier against Moldova when he came in for Maicol Berretti.

== Personal life ==
Battistini works as a house painter while also playing football.
