= Aleksandr Lebedev (biochemist) =

Russian biochemist

Alexander Nikolayevich Lebedev (1869–1937) was a biochemist in the Russian Empire and the Soviet Union. He is known for his early experiments on the biochemical basis of behavior. Lebedev apprenticed as a student with physiologist and psychologist Ivan Pavlov, becoming familiar with various techniques involved used in behavioral psychology. Lebedev developed a theory that behavior in general, and specifically conditioned behavior, had a biochemical rather than psychological basis. He began his studies in biochemistry in Moscow State University, obtaining a doctorate in 1898. He then proceeded to publish widely on the topic of "biochemistry of the mind" and is considered by some to have pioneered the field of neuropharmacology.

== Sources ==
- Cooper, D. M. Russian Science Reader, Oxford, Pergamon Press; NY, Macmillan (1964).
