= Dzyanis Lebedzew =

Belarusian footballer

Personal information
- Date of birth: 26 June 1992 (age 34)
- Place of birth: Bobruisk, Mogilev Oblast, Belarus
- Height: 1.93 m (6 ft 4 in)
- Position: Goalkeeper

Youth career
- 2009–2011: Belshina Bobruisk

Senior career*
Years	Team	Apps	(Gls)
2009–2014	Belshina Bobruisk	2	(0)
2013–2014	→ Khimik Svetlogorsk (loan)	11	(0)
2015	Bereza-2010	15	(0)
2016–2019	Khimik Svetlogorsk	70	(0)
- * Club domestic league appearances and goals as of 31 December 2019

Dzyanis Lebedzew (Belarusian: Дзяніс Лебедзеў; Russian: Денис Лебедев; born 26 June 1992) is a Belarusian former footballer.

In July 2020 Lebedzew was found guilty of being involved in a match-fixing schema in Belarusian football. He was sentenced to 1 year of house arrest and banned from Belarusian football for three years.
