= Artur Slabashevich =

Belarusian footballer

Personal information
- Date of birth: 9 February 1989 (age 37)
- Place of birth: Minsk, Belarusian SSR
- Height: 1.85 m (6 ft 1 in)
- Position: Left back

Youth career
- 2005–2006: Zvezda-BGU Minsk

Senior career*
Years	Team	Apps	(Gls)
2006–2007	Zvezda-BGU Minsk	30	(1)
2008–2009	Baník Most	0	(0)
2010	Vedrich-97 Rechitsa	10	(0)
2011	Zvezda-BGU Minsk	15	(4)
2011–2013	Smolevichi-STI	74	(5)
2014	Isloch Minsk Raion	17	(1)
2015	Slavia Mozyr	23	(0)
2016	Vitebsk	13	(0)
2016–2019	Isloch Minsk Raion	69	(4)
2019–2020	Neman Grodno	38	(0)
2021	Dinamo Brest	27	(0)
2022–2023	Belshina Bobruisk	25	(1)
- * Club domestic league appearances and goals as of 31 December 2023

Artur Slabashevich (Belarusian: Артур Слабашэвіч; Russian: Артур Слабашевич; born 9 February 1989) is a Belarusian professional footballer who plays for Belshina Bobruisk.
