= Alyaksandr Anyukevich =

Belarusian professional football player

Personal information
- Full name: Alyaksandr Antonavich Anyukevich
- Date of birth: 10 April 1992 (age 34)
- Place of birth: Grodno, Belarus
- Height: 1.88 m (6 ft 2 in)
- Position: Defender

Youth career
- 2008–2010: Neman Grodno

Senior career*
Years	Team	Apps	(Gls)
2010–2018	Neman Grodno	142	(1)
2019–2021	Slutsk	64	(0)
2022–2024	Neman Grodno	21	(1)

International career^{‡}
2008–2009	Belarus U17	4	(0)
2009–2010	Belarus U19	4	(0)
2012–2013	Belarus U21	17	(1)
- * Club domestic league appearances and goals as of 31 December 2024 ‡ National team caps and goals as of 5 November 2014

Alyaksandr Antonavich Anyukevich (Belarusian: Аляксандр Антонавiч Анюкевіч; Russian: Александр Антонович Анюкевич; born 10 April 1992) is a Belarusian former professional football player.

== Career ==
Born in Grodno, Anyukevich began playing football in FC Neman Grodno's youth system. He joined the senior team and made his Belarusian Premier League debut in 2010.
