= Polesye Stadium =

Sports venue in Luninets, Belarus

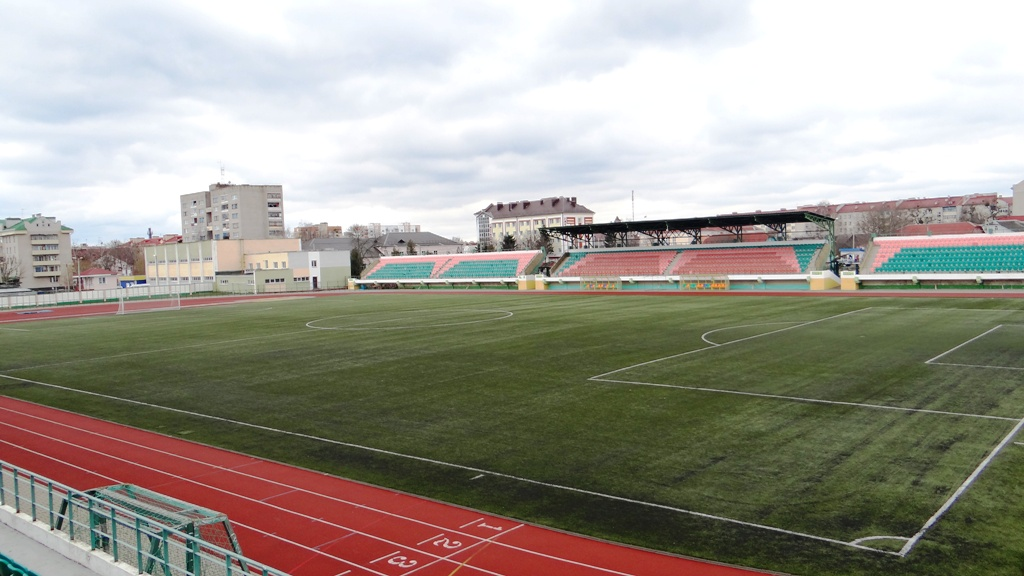
- Interactive map of Polesye Stadium
- Location: Luninets, Belarus
- Coordinates: 52.2474°N 26.80492°E
- Capacity: 3,090
- Surface: Artificial turf
- Field size: 105 x 68m

Construction
- Renovated: 2007–2009

Tenant
- Granit Mikashevichi

Polesye Stadium (Belarusian: Стадыён «Палессе», Russian: Стадин «Полесье») is a multi-purpose stadium in Luninets, Belarus. It is currently used as a home ground of Granit from the neighboring town of Mikashevichi. The stadium is an all-seater and has a capacity of 3,090 people. The stadium was previously used by local team FC Luninets, before it went defunct. It was occupied by Granit in mid-2000s.
