= Vladimir Shibeko =

Belarusian footballer

Personal information
- Date of birth: 2 March 1986 (age 40)
- Place of birth: Minsk, Belarusian SSR, Soviet Union
- Height: 1.85 m (6 ft 1 in)
- Position: Defender

Youth career
- 2002–2004: Lokomotiv Minsk

Senior career*
Years	Team	Apps	(Gls)
2005–2008	Lokomotiv Minsk	63	(0)
2009	Granit Mikashevichi	0	(0)
2009	SKVICH Minsk	12	(1)
2010–2011	DSK Gomel	35	(0)
2012	SKVICH Minsk	23	(0)
2013	Slutsk	22	(1)
2014–2015	Isloch Minsk Raion	38	(1)
2016	Orsha	11	(0)
2017	Kletsk	20	(2)
2018	NFK Minsk	28	(5)
2019	Uzda	26	(1)
- * Club domestic league appearances and goals as of 31 December 2019

Vladimir Shibeko (Belarusian: Уладзімір Шыбека; Russian: Владимир Шибеко; born 2 March 1986) is a Belarusian former professional footballer.
