= Sergey Rusetsky =

Belarusian footballer

Personal information
- Date of birth: 8 March 1989 (age 37)
- Place of birth: Minsk, Belarusian SSR, Soviet Union
- Height: 1.84 m (6 ft 0 in)
- Position: Midfielder

Team information
- Current team: Zorka-BDU Minsk (manager)

Senior career*
Years	Team	Apps	(Gls)
2006–2007	Zvezda-BGU Minsk	30	(2)
2008–2011	Baník Most	49	(2)
2009	→ Chomutov (loan)	15	(8)
2012	Zvezda-BGU Minsk	12	(7)
2012	Brage	10	(2)
2013–2017	Energetik-BGU Minsk	72	(24)
2013	→ Minsk (loan)	1	(0)
2014	→ Dnepr Mogilev (loan)	6	(0)
2018	Buxoro	10	(1)
2018	Smolevichi	14	(0)
2019	NFK Minsk	8	(0)

International career
2009–2011	Belarus U21	4	(3)
2011	Belarus Olympic	1	(0)

Managerial career
- 2020–: Zorka-BDU Minsk
- * Club domestic league appearances and goals

Sergey Rusetsky (Belarusian: Сяргей Русецкi; Russian: Серге́й Русецкий; born 8 March 1989) is a Belarusian football coach and former player. Since 2020 he is a head coach of women's club Zorka-BDU Minsk.

== Career ==
Rusetsky began his career playing for the third-level side Zvezda-BGU Minsk. In early 2008 he switched to Czech side FK Baník Most.

From 2008 to 2011 he was a player of the Czech club FK Baník Most of the second division. In 2009 he was loaned at Chomutov. In 2012 he returned to Zvezda-BGU Minsk. In the same year he played for the Swedish football club Brage.

At the beginning of 2013, he again became a player of Zvezda-BGU Minsk, but was soon loaned by Minsk, where he played only one match and left the team in the summer due to injury.

In August 2014, he became a player of Dnepr Mogilev. Since 2015, he again began to play for Zvezda-BGU Minsk. He missed most of the 2016 season due to injury.

In the first half of 2018, he played for Buxoro. In July he returned to Belarus and began to play for Smolevichi. In January 2019, he moved to NFK Minsk and left the team in August.

In total, he played 21 matches in the Belarusian Premier League.
