= Vital Shapyatowski =

Belarusian footballer

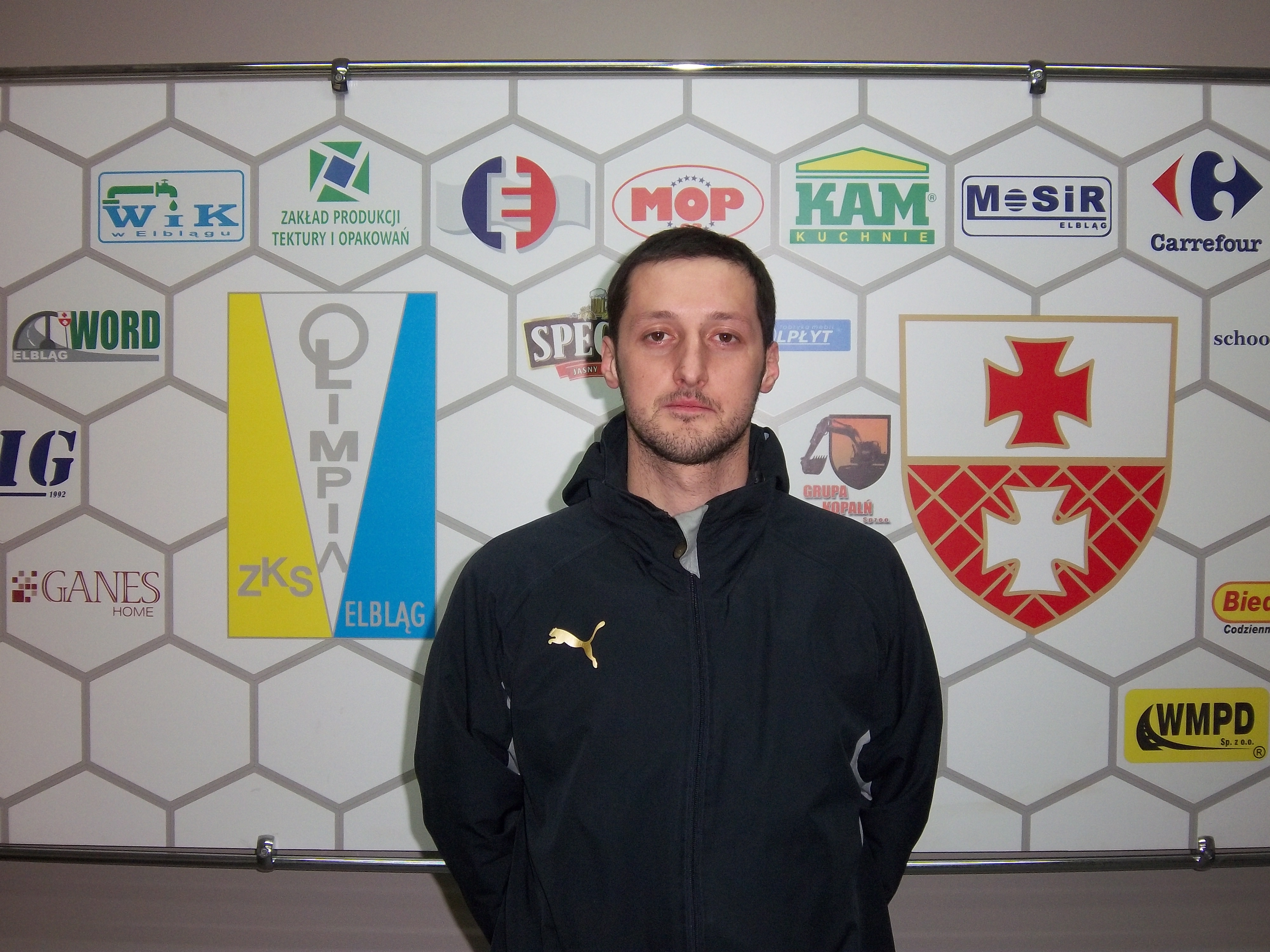

Personal information
- Date of birth: 27 September 1983 (age 43)
- Place of birth: Soviet Union
- Height: 1.78 m (5 ft 10 in)
- Position: Midfielder

Youth career
- SDYuShOR-5 Minsk

Senior career*
Years	Team	Apps	(Gls)
2000	Traktor Minsk	12	(0)
2000	Dinamo-2 Minsk	3	(0)
2001	Kommunalnik Slonim	10	(0)
2001	Lokomotiv Minsk	3	(0)
2002	MTZ-RIPO Minsk	22	(1)
2003–2004	Torpedo-SKA Minsk	5	(0)
2004–2005	Zvezda-BGU Minsk	22	(3)
2005–2008	Darida Minsk Raion	71	(6)
2008	Kryvbas Kryvyi Rih	4	(0)
2009	Neman Grodno	3	(0)
2009	Smorgon	11	(0)
2010	Gorodeya	28	(4)
2011	Olimpia Elbląg	7	(0)
2011	Partizan Minsk	13	(1)
2012	SKVICH Minsk	25	(7)
2013	Smorgon	23	(2)
2014	Krumkachy Minsk	13	(1)
2014–2015	Isloch Minsk Raion	41	(2)
2016	Torpedo Minsk	11	(1)
2016–2018	Luch Minsk	49	(5)
- * Club domestic league appearances and goals

Vital Shapyatowski (Belarusian: Віталь Шапятоўскі; Russian: Виталий Шепетовский; born 27 September 1983) is a Belarusian former professional footballer who played as a midfielder.

== Career ==
=== Club ===
In January 2011, he joined Olimpia Elbląg on a one-year contract.
