= Gennady Lebedev =

Russian economist (1957–2004)

Gennady Victorovich Lebedev
- Born: 29 April 1957; USSR
- Died: 12 May 2004 (aged 47); Turkey

Academic background
- Education: Moscow State University

Academic work
- Discipline: Economics, political science

Gennady Victorovich Lebedev (April 29, 1957 in the USSR – May 12, 2004 in Turkey) was a Russian economist, representative of Austrian School, businessman and politician. He advocated free enterprise and laissez-faire.

== Biography ==
Gennady Lebedev was born on 29 April 1957 in Soviet Union. In 1974 he enrolled in MSU Faculty of Mechanics and Mathematics, a faculty of Moscow State University. He graduated with distinction and became postgraduate student. He then joined the Laboratory of computational approaches of MSU Faculty of Mechanics and Mathematics.

He was an author of several computer sciences textbooks. For example, his most popular textbook for pupils, Basic computer sciences and computer engineering, was published in an edition of 7 million. Others of his textbooks are also popular among professors and Lebedev's influence on Russian computer science is widely acknowledged.

In the beginning of 1992 he left the post of chairman and participated in the corporatization of Nakhodka Commercial Sea Port and organisation of Yukos Oil Company where initially he worked as a consultant and later as a vice-president.

Lebedev died on May 12, 2004, and is buried in Troitsk.

== Readings in memory of Gennady Lebedev ==
Readings in memory of Lebedev take place yearly and are dedicated to projects which develop ideas of freedom and liberty.

== Works ==
- Liberal Charter. 1992 year
- Constitution of Ideal State. 1992 year.
- Commercial Engineering and Municipal Services. 1992 year.
- Thesises about taxes and tax system. 1997 year.
- Constitutional amendments. 2001 year.
- Conception of energetics development in Russian Federation. 2001 year.
- Obligations of presidential candidate. 1999 year.

== GVL Library ==
Russian publishing house 'Sotsium' jointly with 'Liberal Charter' organised the special series of books called 'GVL Library in honour of Gennady Lebedev (GVL are his initials) and the common subject of the books is libertarian orientation.
