= Pavel Zuyevich =

Belarusian footballer

Personal information
- Date of birth: 12 July 1997 (age 29)
- Place of birth: Morach, Kletsk Raion, Minsk Oblast, Belarus
- Position: Forward

Senior career*
Years	Team	Apps	(Gls)
2014–2015	Kletsk	44	(5)
2016–2017	Krumkachy Minsk	7	(0)
2017–2020	Slutsk	16	(0)
2021	Shakhtyor Petrikov	30	(6)

International career^{‡}
2017	Belarus U21	1	(0)
- * Club domestic league appearances and goals as of 31 December 2021 ‡ National team caps and goals as of 1 June 2017

Pavel Zuyevich (Belarusian: Павел Зуевіч; Russian: Павел Зуевич; born 12 July 1997) is a Belarusian former professional footballer.
