= Sergey Lebedev =

Sergey Lebedev, Sergei Lebedev, Sergej Lebedev, Sergei Lebedew, Серге́й Ле́бедев or Сергей Лебедев may refer to:

- Sergey Lebedev (chess player) (1868–1942), Russian chess player
- Sergey Lebedev (chemist) (1874–1934), Russian chemist
- Sergey Lebedev (scientist) (1902–1974), Russian electrical engineer and computer scientist
- Sergey Lebedev (politician) (born 1948), Uzbekistan-born Russian politician
- Sergey Lebedev (footballer) (born 1969), Uzbekistan-born Soviet association football midfielder
- Sergei Lebedev (writer) (born 1981), nominated for the 2021 Jan Michalski Prize
