= Ihar Yasinski =

Belarusian professional footballer (born 1990)

Personal information
- Full name: Ihar Syarheyevich Yasinski
- Date of birth: 4 July 1990 (age 36)
- Place of birth: Pinsk, Brest Oblast, Byelorussian SSR, Soviet Union
- Height: 1.75 m (5 ft 9 in)
- Position: Midfielder

Team information
- Current team: Bumprom Gomel
- Number: 92

Youth career
- 2007–2010: Dinamo Minsk

Senior career*
Years	Team	Apps	(Gls)
2007–2012	Dinamo Minsk	6	(0)
2010	→ Dnepr Mogilev (loan)	1	(0)
2012	→ Neman Grodno (loan)	25	(0)
2013–2014	Neman Grodno	14	(0)
2015	Granit Mikashevichi	13	(0)
2016	Naftan Novopolotsk	3	(0)
2016	Belshina Bobruisk	13	(2)
2017	Kauno Žalgiris	17	(0)
2018	Slutsk	19	(0)
2019–2021	Sputnik Rechitsa	62	(2)
2021	Dnepr Mogilev	17	(0)
2022	Rogachev	16	(0)
2023–	Bumprom Gomel	26	(0)

International career
2007–2008	Belarus U17	6	(0)
2009	Belarus U19	7	(0)
2010–2012	Belarus U21	14	(0)
- * Club domestic league appearances and goals as of 31 December 2023

Ihar Syarheyevich Yasinski (Belarusian: Ігар Сяргеевіч Ясінскі; Russian: Игорь Сергеевич Ясинский; born 4 July 1990) is a Belarusian professional footballer who plays for Bumprom Gomel.

== Career ==
Born in Pinsk, Yasinski began playing football in FC Dinamo Minsk's youth system. He joined the senior team and made his Belarusian Premier League debut in 2007. He was called to the U-17, U-19 and U-21 Belarus national teams. In 2017, he played for Kauno Žalgiris.
