= Valeri Lenichko =

Belarusian footballer

Personal information
- Full name: Valeri Vladimirovich Lenichko
- Date of birth: 6 March 1987 (age 39)
- Place of birth: Kalinkovichi, Gomel Oblast, Belarusian SSR
- Height: 1.80 m (5 ft 11 in)
- Position: Forward

Youth career
- Lokomotiv Moscow

Senior career*
| Years | Team | Apps | (Gls) |
| 2006 | Vityaz Podolsk | 20 | (4) |
| 2007–2008 | Avangard Podolsk (amateur) | | |
| 2008 | Vityaz Podolsk | 2 | (1) |
| 2009–2010 | Avangard Podolsk | 31 | (1) |
| 2011 | Petrotrest Saint Petersburg | 26 | (4) |
| 2012 | Vitebsk | 10 | (4) |
| 2013 | Biolog-Novokubansk Progress | 16 | (1) |
| 2014 | Vitebsk | 14 | (4) |
| 2015 | VDV-SportKlub Naro-Fominsk | 11 | (5) |
- * Club domestic league appearances and goals

Valeri Vladimirovich Lenichko (Russian: Валерий Владимирович Леничко; born 6 March 1987) is a Belarusian former professional football player who also holds Russian citizenship.

== Club career ==
He played in the Russian Football National League for FC Vityaz Podolsk in 2008.
