= Alyaksandr Kuhan =

Belarusian footballer

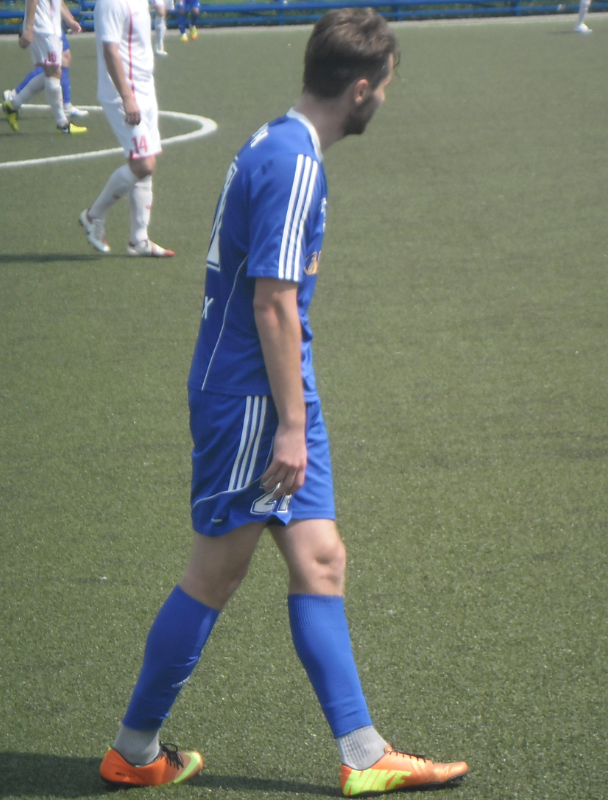

Personal information
- Date of birth: 26 May 1991 (age 35)
- Place of birth: Molodechno, Minsk Oblast, Belarusian SSR
- Height: 1.89 m (6 ft 2 1/2 in)
- Position: Midfielder

Team information
- Current team: Mauerwerk
- Number: 21

Youth career
- 2008–2012: Dinamo Minsk

Senior career*
Years	Team	Apps	(Gls)
2008–2013	Dinamo Minsk	12	(0)
2012	→ Bereza-2010 (loan)	11	(4)
2013	→ Dnepr Mogilev (loan)	16	(2)
2014–2015	Dnepr Mogilev	46	(5)
2016	Slutsk	15	(1)
2017	Utenis Utena	12	(1)
2017	Torpedo Minsk	15	(6)
2018–	Mauerwerk	109	(7)

International career
2007	Belarus U17	3	(0)
2008–2009	Belarus U19	17	(3)
2010–2012	Belarus U21	15	(1)
- * Club domestic league appearances and goals as of 20:35, 9 March 2023 (UTC)

Alyaksandr Uladzimiravich Kuhan (Belarusian: Аляксандр Куган; Russian: Александр Куган; born 26 May 1991) is a Belarusian professional football player who plays for Mauerwerk.

== History ==
Belarusian midfielder joined Lithuanian A Lyga club Utenis on 6 March 2017. He played 12 times in the league, scoring once in delayed first tour match against Kauno Žalgiris, but was released by the club on 30 June 2017.
