= Yawhen Marozaw =

Belarusian footballer

Personal information
- Date of birth: 17 April 1995 (age 31)
- Place of birth: Vitebsk, Belarus
- Height: 1.83 m (6 ft 0 in)
- Position: Defender

Team information
- Current team: Yuni Minsk

Youth career
- 2011–2015: BATE Borisov

Senior career*
Years	Team	Apps	(Gls)
2015	BATE Borisov	0	(0)
2016–2018	Torpedo Minsk	50	(3)
2019	Underdog Chist	23	(3)
2020–2021	Molodechno	40	(5)
2022–2023	Yuni Minsk	29	(2)

International career
2011–2012	Belarus U17	6	(2)
- * Club domestic league appearances and goals as of 31 December 2023

Yawhen Marozaw (Belarusian: Яўген Марозаў; Russian: Евгений Морозов; born 17 April 1995) is a Belarusian professional footballer who plays for Yuni Minsk.
