= Nikita Rochev =

Belarusian footballer

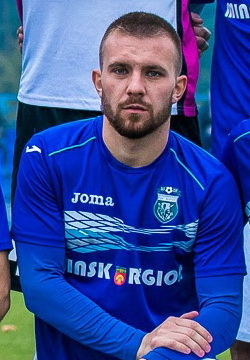

Personal information
- Date of birth: 6 November 1992 (age 34)
- Place of birth: Lida, Grodno Oblast, Belarus
- Height: 1.69 m (5 ft 7 in)
- Position: Defender

Youth career
- 2009: Timiryazevets Moscow
- 2010–2012: BATE Borisov

Senior career*
Years	Team	Apps	(Gls)
2010–2012	BATE Borisov	0	(0)
2012	→ Polotsk (loan)	7	(0)
2013–2014	Slutsk	14	(0)
2014	→ Isloch Minsk Raion (loan)	22	(0)
2015–2017	Isloch Minsk Raion	45	(0)
2017	Lida	11	(0)
2018	Chist	7	(1)
2018–2019	Partizán Bardejov	38	(3)
2020	Belshina Bobruisk	8	(0)
2020–2021	Krumkachy Minsk	29	(1)

International career
2012–2013	Belarus U21	4	(0)
- * Club domestic league appearances and goals as of 31 December 2021

Nikita Rochev (Belarusian: Мікіта Рочаў; Russian: Никита Рочев; born 6 November 1992) is a Belarusian professional footballer.
