= Ioannis Potouridis =

Greek footballer

Giannis Potouridis
Personal information
- Date of birth: 27 February 1992 (age 34)
- Place of birth: Thessaloniki, Greece
- Height: 1.82 m (6 ft 0 in)
- Position: Centre-back

Team information
- Current team: Aris Petroupolis
- Number: 4

Youth career
- –2007: Olympiacos

Senior career*
| Years | Team | Apps | (Gls) |
| 2007–2013 | Olympiacos | 11 | (0) |
| 2012–2013 | → Platanias (loan) | 21 | (0) |
| 2013–2014 | Novara | 17 | (0) |
| 2014–2016 | Panthrakikos | 56 | (0) |
| 2016–2017 | AEL | 6 | (0) |
| 2017 | Miedź Legnica | 5 | (0) |
| 2017 | Miedź Legnica II | 2 | (0) |
| 2017–2019 | OFI | 52 | (1) |
| 2019–2021 | Cape Town City | 22 | (0) |
| 2022–2023 | Proodeftiki | 14 | (0) |
| 2023 | Aiolikos | 22 | (0) |
| 2023–2024 | Panionios | 13 | (0) |
| 2024– | Aris Petroupolis | 6 | (0) |

International career
| 2009–2010 | Greece U17 | 6 | (2) |
| 2010–2012 | Greece U19 | 24 | (2) |
| 2011–2013 | Greece U21 | 22 | (6) |
- * Club domestic league appearances and goals as of 11:44, 27 February 2024 (UTC)

Ioannis Potouridis (Greek: Ιωάννης Ποτουρίδης, born 27 February 1992) is a Greek professional footballer who plays as a centre-back for the Greek club Aris Petroupolis.

== Club career ==
Potourídis made has first league appearances for Olympiakos during 2010. He made his debut on the match against Ilioupoli F.C. in the Greek Cup. Ironically, he is most famous in Greece for two costly mistakes he made in a match against Atromitos towards the end of the 2010–2011 season. In the game, Potourídis twice headed the ball directly to Atromitos attackers who scored two goals as Olympiakos embarrassingly lost 3–1.

On 23 November 2011, he substituted on for Rafik Djebbour during Olympiacos' 1–0 victory over Marseille in the Champions League at the Stade Vélodrome, in Group F.

On 10 August 2012, he was loaned to the newly promoted Super League Greece side Platanias. He made a total of 30 appearances without scoring any goal. On 15 July 2013, he was sold to Novara Calcio.

A year later he returned to Greece, signing a two years contract with Panthrakikos for an undisclosed fee. On 30 August 2016, Potouridis signed a three years contract with Super League Greece club AEL. On 17 January 2017, he solved his contract with the club.

On 1 March 2017, Potouridis signed a six months contract with the Polish I liga club Miedź Legnica.

On 31 July 2017, Potouridis signed a year (plus an additional year) contract with Football League club OFI for an undisclosed fee.

Having not played competitively since April 2019, Potouridis signed for South African Premier Division club Cape Town City in late October.

In the summer of 2022, Potouridis moved to Proodeftiki where he played the following season, making 14 appearances.

After Proodeftiki, Potouridis played for a while at Aiolikos, recording 22 appearances.

In August 2023, Potouridis found himself again at another club, this time at Panionios, making 13 appearances in one season.

In July 2024, Potouridis agreed and transferred to Aris Petroupolis, where he plays to this day.

== International career ==
He has represented his country at Under-17 level and has played in the qualifying and elite round of the UEFA Under-17 European Championship.

== Honours ==
Olympiacos

- Super League Greece: 2010–11, 2011–12
- Greek Football Cup: 2011–12

OFI

- Football League: 2017–18

Proodeftiki

- Gamma Ethniki: 2021–22

Aiolikos

- Gamma Ethniki: 2022–23
