= Dzmitry Shmatko =

Belarusian footballer

Personal information
- Date of birth: 26 July 1989 (age 37)
- Place of birth: Minsk, Belarusian SSR
- Height: 1.96 m (6 ft 5 in)
- Position: Midfielder

Youth career
- 2006–2009: Dinamo Minsk

Senior career*
Years	Team	Apps	(Gls)
2008–2009	Dinamo Minsk	0	(0)
2010–2011	Partizan Minsk	37	(3)
2012	Neman Grodno	2	(0)
2013	Minsk-2	29	(1)
2014	Gorodeya	19	(0)

International career
2008–2009	Belarus U21	5	(1)
2011	Belarus Olympic	1	(0)
- * Club domestic league appearances and goals as of 9 December 2014

Dzmitry Shmatko (Belarusian: Дзмiтры Шматко; Russian: Дмитрий Шматко; born 26 July 1989) is a retired Belarusian professional footballer.
