= Kirill Aleksiyan =

Belarusian professional footballer

Kiryl Aleksiyan
Personal information
- Date of birth: 22 January 1991 (age 35)
- Place of birth: Minsk, Belarusian SSR
- Height: 1.83 m (6 ft 0 in)
- Position: Midfielder

Senior career*
Years	Team	Apps	(Gls)
2008–2014	BATE Borisov	6	(0)
2012	→ Brest (loan)	8	(0)
2013	→ Gomel (loan)	6	(0)
2013–2014	→ Granit Mikashevichi (loan)	45	(4)
2015	Hrvatski Dragovoljac	7	(0)
2015	Smolevichi-STI	6	(1)
2016	Torpedo Minsk	22	(1)
2017	Jonava	7	(0)
2017–2019	NFK Minsk	47	(5)
2020	Volna Pinsk	9	(0)
2021	Orsha	8	(0)

International career^{‡}
2012	Belarus U21	2	(0)
- * Club domestic league appearances and goals as of 31 December 2021 ‡ National team caps and goals as of 20 February 2015

Kiryl Aleksiyan (Belarusian: Кiрыл Алексiян; Russian: Кирилл Алексиян; born 22 January 1991) is a Belarusian former professional footballer.

== Career ==
Aleksiyan made his first steps in football with Smena Minsk before joining BATE Borisov in 2008. He initially represented the reserve team and made his debut for the senior BATE side in September 2009. In 2017 he played for Jonava.

== Honours ==
BATE Borisov

- Belarusian Premier League champion: 2011
