= Anton Burko =

Belarusian footballer

Personal information
- Date of birth: 16 February 1995 (age 31)
- Place of birth: Belarus
- Position: Midfielder

Youth career
- 2012–2014: Belshina Bobruisk

Senior career*
Years	Team	Apps	(Gls)
2014–2016	Belshina Bobruisk	9	(0)
- * Club domestic league appearances and goals as of 31 December 2016

Anton Burko (Belarusian: Антон Бурко; Russian: Антон Бурко; born 16 February 1995) is a Belarusian former professional footballer.
