= Dmitri Khlebosolov =

Belarusian footballer

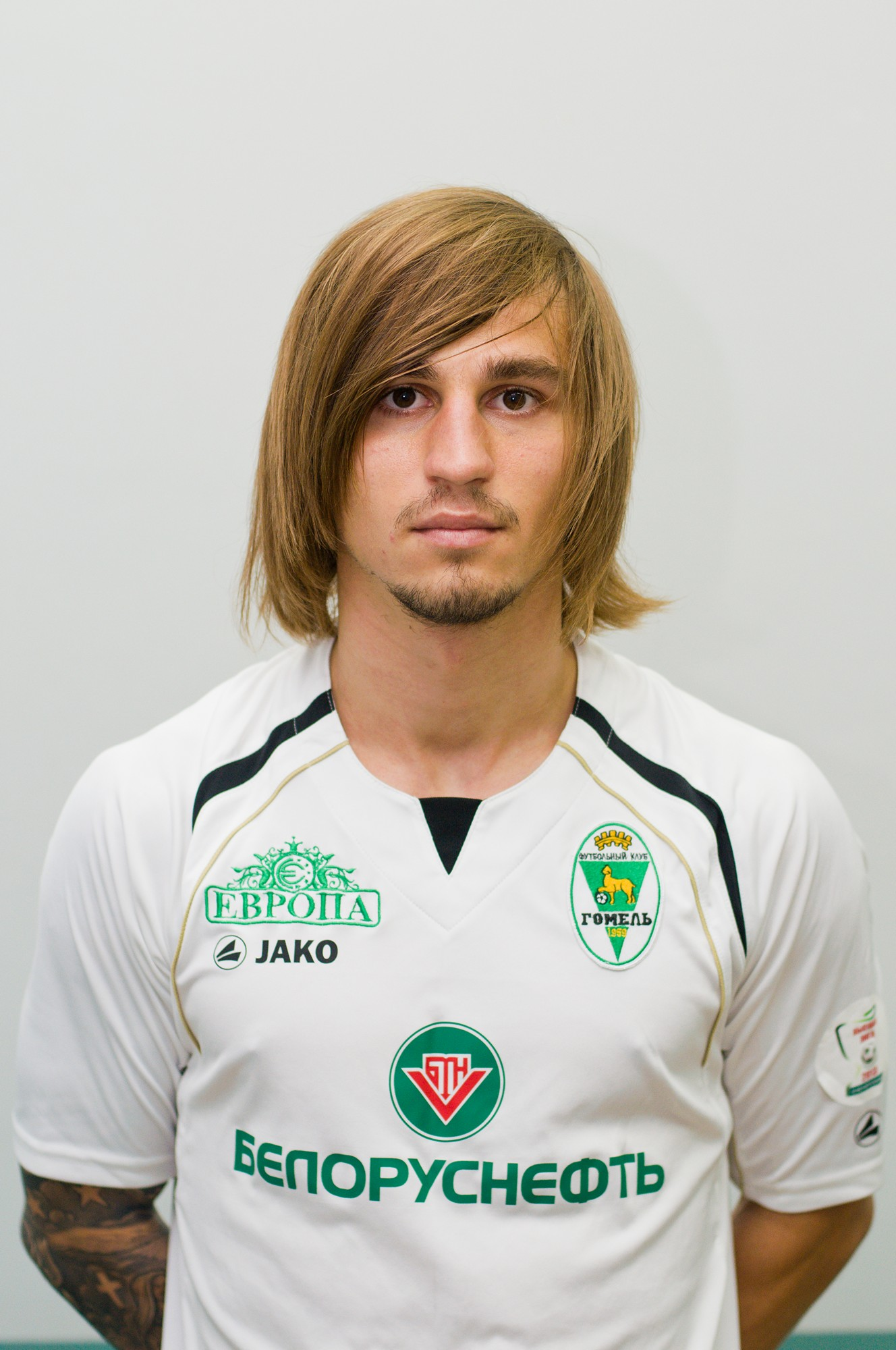
- Khlebosolov with Gomel in 2013

Personal information
- Date of birth: 7 October 1990 (age 36)
- Place of birth: Brest, Belarusian SSR
- Height: 1.72 m (5 ft 7 1/2 in)
- Position: Forward

Senior career*
| Years | Team | Apps | (Gls) |
| 2006–2008 | Baranovichi | 59 | (23) |
| 2009–2013 | Spartak Moscow | 0 | (0) |
| 2011 | → Naftan Novopolotsk (loan) | 30 | (6) |
| 2012 | → Torpedo-BelAZ Zhodino (loan) | 9 | (1) |
| 2013 | → Dynamo Dresden (loan) | 1 | (0) |
| 2013 | Gomel | 14 | (2) |
| 2014 | Belshina Bobruisk | 30 | (10) |
| 2015 | Granit Mikashevichi | 13 | (1) |
| 2015 | Vitebsk | 11 | (4) |
| 2016 | Wisła Puławy | 5 | (0) |
| 2016 | Baranovichi | 4 | (3) |
| 2017 | Neman Grodno | 9 | (0) |
| 2018 | Slavia Mozyr | 23 | (2) |
| 2019 | Baranovichi | 8 | (1) |
| 2019 | United Victory | 6 | (5) |
| 2019–2020 | Baranovichi | 29 | (25) |

International career
| 2010–2012 | Belarus U21 | 15 | (9) |
- * Club domestic league appearances and goals

Dmitri Khlebosolov (Belarusian: Дзмiтры Хлебасолаў; Russian: Дмитрий Хлебосолов; born 7 October 1990) is a Belarusian former professional footballer who played as a forward.

He is a son of Belarusian coach and former international footballer Andrey Khlebasolaw.

== Career ==
=== Club ===
In January 2018, Khlebosolov went on trial with Tajik League Champions Istiklol.

== Honours ==
Naftan Novopolotsk

- Belarusian Cup: 2011–12
