= FC Alfa Minsk =

- Full name: Football Club Alfa Minsk
- Founded: 2011
- Ground: RCOP-BGU Stadium, Minsk
- Capacity: 1,500
- League: Belarusian Second League
- 2015: 15th

FC Alfa Minsk is a Belarusian football club based in Minsk.

== History ==
The club was founded as AK Zhdanovichi in 2011 as an amateur club attached to Agro-Combinat Zhdanovichi. From 2011 till 2013 they played in local amateur competitions. In 2014 AK Zhdanovichi joined Belarusian Second League, where they played for two seasons. In early 2016 they withdrew from the league, after Agro-Combinat Zhdanovichi ended their financial support. They continued playing in local Minsk amateur leagues.

Since 2017 the team relocated to Minsk on a permanent basis. During 2017–2018 they were known as Kovcheg-Service Minsk, and since 2019 they were renamed to Fenix Minsk. In 2020 they changed the name to Alfa Minsk due to sponsorship deal.
