= Alyaksandr Yadeshka =

Belarusian footballer

Personal information
- Date of birth: 28 January 1993 (age 33)
- Place of birth: Grodno, Belarus
- Height: 1.76 m (5 ft 9 1/2 in)
- Position: Forward

Youth career
- 2008–2010: Neman Grodno

Senior career*
Years	Team	Apps	(Gls)
2010–2015	Neman Grodno	15	(1)
2013	→ Khimik Svetlogorsk (loan)	27	(5)
2014	→ Gorodeya (loan)	22	(0)

International career
2012	Belarus U21	10	(0)
- * Club domestic league appearances and goals as of 8 December 2015

Alyaksandr Yadeshka (Belarusian: Аляксандр Ядэшка; Russian: Александр Едешко; born 28 January 1993) is a Belarusian former professional football player.

== Career ==
His latest club was Neman Grodno, where he played until the end of the 2015 season.
