= Aleh Patotski =

Belarusian footballer

Personal information
- Date of birth: 24 June 1991 (age 35)
- Place of birth: Minsk, Belarusian SSR
- Height: 1.68 m (5 ft 6 in)
- Position: Midfielder

Youth career
- 2008–2010: BATE Borisov

Senior career*
Years	Team	Apps	(Gls)
2010–2012	BATE Borisov	11	(1)
2012	→ Dnepr Mogilev (loan)	24	(4)
2013	Dnepr Mogilev	16	(1)
2014	Gorodeya	14	(0)
2015–2023	Isloch Minsk Raion	156	(8)
2026–	Unixlabs Minsk	4	(0)

International career
2010–2012	Belarus U21	11	(4)
- * Club domestic league appearances and goals as of 29 August 2026

Aleh Anatolyevich Patotski (Belarusian: Алег Патоцкі; Russian: Олег Патоцкий (Oleg Patotskiy); born 24 June 1991) is a Belarusian former professional football player.

== Honours ==
BATE Borisov

- Belarusian Premier League champion: 2010, 2011
