= Vadim Kurlovich =

Belarusian footballer

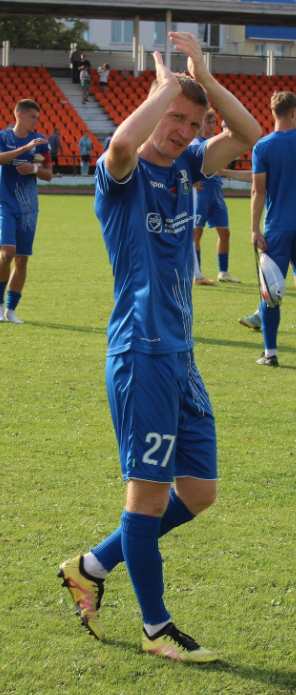

Personal information
- Date of birth: 30 October 1992 (age 34)
- Place of birth: Mikashevichi, Brest Oblast, Belarus
- Height: 1.75 m (5 ft 9 in)
- Position: Midfielder

Team information
- Current team: Slutsk
- Number: 27

Youth career
- 2009: Granit Mikashevichi

Senior career*
Years	Team	Apps	(Gls)
2010–2013	BATE Borisov	8	(0)
2013	→ Vitebsk (loan)	13	(4)
2013	→ Dinamo Brest (loan)	12	(1)
2014–2015	Dinamo Brest	41	(4)
2015–2016	Slutsk	18	(0)
2016	Granit Mikashevichi	15	(0)
2017–2019	Slavia Mozyr	68	(7)
2020–2021	Sputnik Rechitsa	39	(5)
2022	Shakhtyor Petrikov	24	(9)
2023	Naftan Novopolotsk	27	(0)
2024–	Slutsk	68	(6)

International career
2012	Belarus U21	10	(0)
- * Club domestic league appearances and goals as of 6 July 2026

Vadim Kurlovich (Belarusian: Вадзiм Курловiч; Russian: Вадим Курлович; born 30 October 1992) is a Belarusian professional football player who plays for Slutsk.

== Honours ==
BATE Borisov

- Belarusian Premier League champion: 2010, 2011, 2012
