= Yawhen Lashankow =

Belarusian footballer and coach

Personal information
- Date of birth: 2 January 1979 (age 47)
- Place of birth: Minsk, Belarusian SSR
- Height: 1.70 m (5 ft 7 in)
- Position: Midfielder

Team information
- Current team: BATE Borisov (coach)

Youth career
- 1997–1998: Smena-BATE Minsk

Senior career*
Years	Team	Apps	(Gls)
1997–2004	BATE Borisov	187	(16)
1997–1998	→ Smena-BATE Minsk	26	(3)
2004–2006	Chornomorets Odesa	28	(7)
2007	Kharkiv	9	(0)
2008–2009	Granit Mikashevichi	52	(11)
2010–2011	Minsk	58	(8)
2012	Belshina Bobruisk	8	(0)
2012	Torpedo-BelAZ Zhodino	9	(0)
2013–2016	Slutsk	80	(4)
2016	Baranovichi	13	(1)

International career
2000–2001	Belarus U21	15	(1)
2004	Belarus Olympic	3	(1)
2005	Belarus	1	(0)

Managerial career
- 2017–: BATE Borisov (youth)
- * Club domestic league appearances and goals

Yawhen Lashankow (Belarusian: Яўген Лашанкоў; Russian: Евгений Лошанков; born 2 January 1979 in Minsk) is a Belarusian professional football coach and former player. As of 2017, he works as youth team coach at BATE Borisov.

== Honours ==
BATE Borisov

- Belarusian Premier League champion: 1999, 2002
