= Lebedyev =

Lebedyev (Ukrainian: Лебедєв) is a Ukrainian-language surname, equivalent to Russian Lebedev. Notable people with the surnem include:

- Pavlo Lebedyev, Ukrainian and Russian politician, financier and businessman
- Yevhen Lebedyev (1941–2018), Ukrainian chemist
