= Haradski Stadium =

Football stadium in Barysaw, Belarus

Borisov City Stadium
- Гарадскі стадыён (Барысаў)
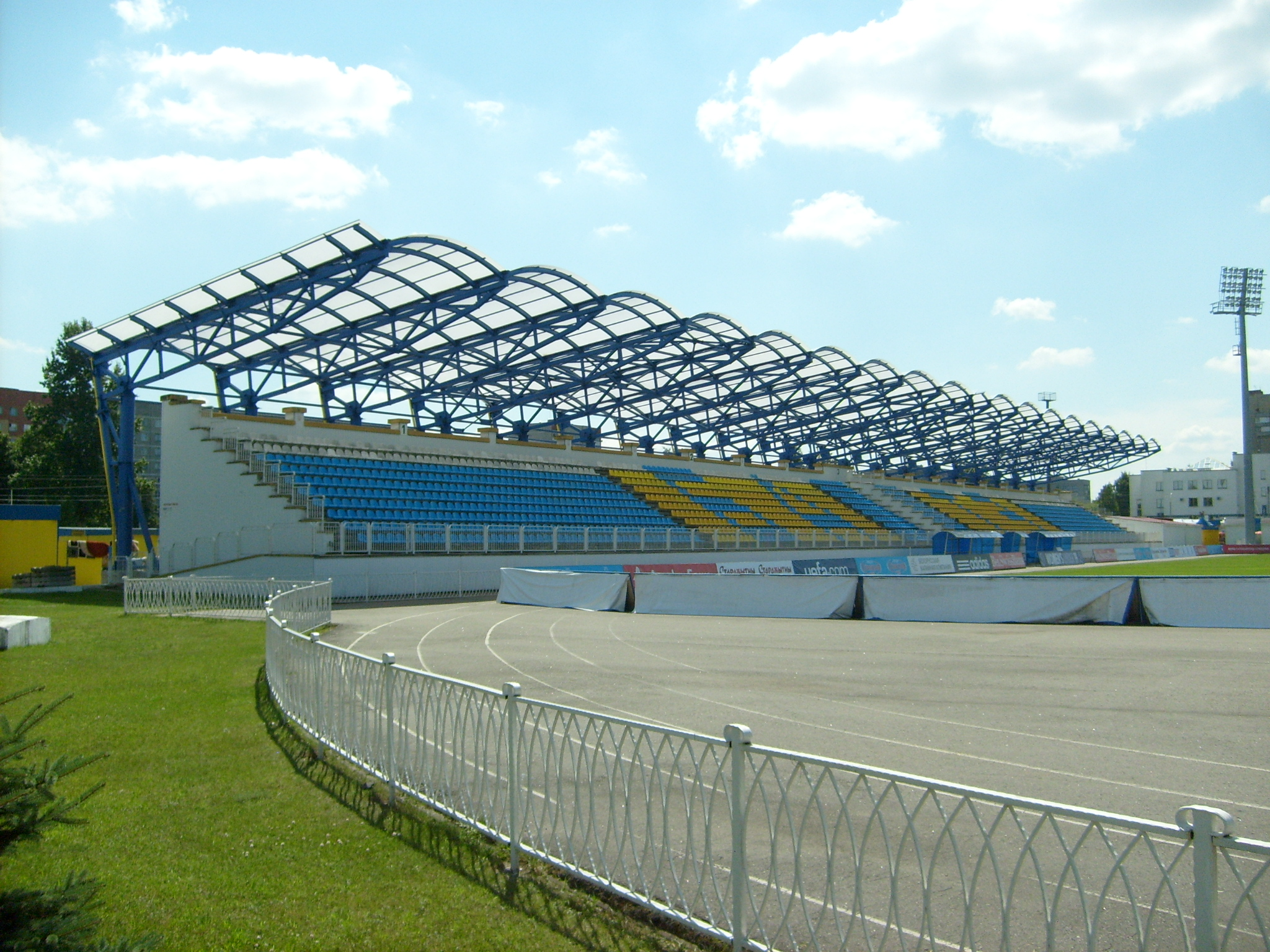
- Interactive map of Borisov City Stadium
- Location: Barysaw, Belarus
- Coordinates: 54°13′20.79″N 28°29′25.64″E
- Owner: Barysaw
- Capacity: 5,402 (football)
- Surface: Grass
- Field size: 105 m × 68 m (344 ft × 223 ft)

Construction
- Opened: 1959

Tenants
- BATE Borisov (1996–2014); Belarus national under-21 football team (1998–)

Haradski Stadium (Belarusian: Гарадскі стадыён, Russian: Городской стадион; literally "City Stadium") is a multi-purpose stadium in Barysaw, Belarus. It is currently used mostly for football matches and was the home ground of BATE Borisov before they moved to the Borisov Arena in 2014. The stadium has a maximum holding capacity of 5,402 people. The stadium was opened in 1959.

== International use ==
The stadium is allowed to host UEFA Champions League matches up to 3rd qualifying round and UEFA Europa League matches up to play-off round. For the later stages of both competitions, BATE Borisov had to use a bigger venue, which usually was Dinamo Stadium in Minsk. In 2010, Haradski Stadium was also used by Torpedo Zhodino in the Second qualifying round of the Europa League.

Since 1998, the stadium has been used as a primary home venue for Belarus national under-21 football team, though the team still occasionally plays in other cities. It was also used as a home ground for Belarus national football team on one occasion, which was a friendly match against Moldova in June 2009 that ended with a 2–2 draw.
