= Yawhen Lebedzew =

Belarusian footballer

Personal information
- Date of birth: 29 December 1994 (age 31)
- Place of birth: Vitebsk, Belarus
- Height: 1.86 m (6 ft 1 in)
- Position: Forward

Youth career
- 2008–2012: Vitebsk

Senior career*
Years	Team	Apps	(Gls)
2012	Vitebsk-2	23	(5)
2013–2016	Shakhtyor Soligorsk	0	(0)
2014	→ Granit Mikashevichi (loan)	24	(3)
2015	→ Vitebsk (loan)	17	(1)
2016	→ Naftan Novopolotsk (loan)	22	(4)
2017	Torpedo Minsk	21	(3)
2018	Orsha	9	(2)
2018	Slavia Mozyr	3	(0)
2019	Orsha	13	(1)
2020	Viktoriya Maryina Gorka	7	(3)
2020	Volna Pinsk	10	(1)
2021	Slonim-2017	11	(2)
2022–2023	Miory	34	(17)

International career
2013–2016	Belarus U21	23	(5)
- * Club domestic league appearances and goals as of 31 December 2023

Yawhen Lebedzew (Belarusian: Яўген Лебедзеў; Russian: Евгений Лебедев; born 29 December 1994) is a Belarusian professional footballer.
