= 2015–16 Belarusian Cup =

Tournament details
- Country: Belarus
- Teams: 55

Final positions
- Champions: Torpedo-BelAZ Zhodino (1st title)
- Runners-up: BATE Borisov

Tournament statistics
- Matches played: 84
- Goals scored: 305 (3.63 per match)
- Top goal scorer(s): Mikhail Gordeichuk; Maksim Skavysh (7 goals)

The 2015–16 Belarusian Cup was the 25th season of the Belarusian annual cup competition. Contrary to the league season, it has been conducted in a fall-spring rhythm. The first were played on 23 May 2015. Winners of the Cup qualified for the second qualifying round of the 2016–17 UEFA Europa League.

== Participating clubs ==
The following teams took part in the competition:

| 2015 Belarusian Premier League all 14 teams | 2015 Belarusian First League all 16 teams | 2015 Belarusian Second League all 20 teams | Winners of regional cups 5 teams |
| BATE Borisov; Dinamo Minsk; Shakhtyor Soligorsk; Torpedo-BelAZ Zhodino; Naftan Novopolotsk; Gomel; Minsk; Neman Grodno; Slutsk; Belshina Bobruisk; Dinamo Brest; Granit Mikashevichi; Slavia Mozyr; Vitebsk | Dnepr Mogilev; Smorgon; Rechitsa-2014; Gorodeya; Isloch Minsk Raion; Khimik Svetlogorsk; Zvezda-BGU Minsk; Smolevichi-STI; Gomelzheldortrans; Bereza-2010; Lida; Slonim; Baranovichi; Krumkachy Minsk; Orsha; Kobrin | Volna Pinsk; Belita-Viteks Uzda; Zhlobin; Luch Minsk; AK Zhdanovichi; Osipovichi; Torpedo Minsk; Spartak Shklov; Kletsk; MKK-Dnepr Rogachev; Molodechno-DYuSSh-4; Priozerye Verkhnedvinsk; Krutogorye Dzerzhinsk; Kolos-Druzhba Baranovichi Raion; Vertikal Kalinkovichi; Oshmyany; UAS-DYuSSh-Zhitkovichi; Torpedo Mogilev; Viktoriya Maryina Gorka; Lyuban | Brestzhilstroy (Brest Oblast); FSK Grodnenskiy (Grodno Oblast); Zhodino-2007 (Minsk Oblast); Zarya Krugloye (Mogilev Oblast); Gazovik Vitebsk (Vitebsk Oblast) |

== First round ==
In this round 5 amateur clubs and 9 randomly chosen Second League clubs were drawn into 7 fixtures. The matches were played on 23 and 24 May 2015.

| 23 May 2015 | Zarya Krugloye (A) | 3–0 | MKK-Dnepr Rogachev (III) | Krugloye |
| 15:00 | Khrapko 14'; Maslenkovich 65'; Pasekunov 84' | Report | | Stadium: DYUSSH Stadium; Attendance: 500; Referee: Sergey Chistov (Minsk) |

| 23 May 2015 | Zhodino-2007 (A) | 0–1 | Luch Minsk (III) | Zhodino |
| 15:00 | | Report | Syrokvashko 75' (pen.) | Stadium: Torpedo Stadium; Attendance: 200; Referee: Amin Kurgkheli (Gomel) |

| 23 May 2015 | UAS DYuSSh-Zhitkovichi (III) | 0–1 | Lyuban (III) | Zhitkovichi |
| 16:00 | Dubovskiy 87' | Report | | Stadium: City Stadium; Attendance: 300; Referee: Yevgeniy Naumov (Minsk) |

| 23 May 2015 | FSK Grodnenskiy (A) | 1–2 | Kolos-Druzhba Baranovichi Raion (III) | Skidel |
| 16:00 | Kardash 3' | Report | Titko 48'; Malinovsky 54' | Stadium: FSK Stadium; Attendance: 250; Referee: Artur Kunay (Brest) |

| 23 May 2015 | Zhlobin (III) | 3–1 | Viktoriya Maryina Gorka (III) | Zhlobin |
| 17:00 | Torop 53', 75'; Verkhov 61' | Report | Harkusha 89' | Stadium: Lokomotiv Stadium; Attendance: 150; Referee: Valeriy Golomzik (Bobruisk) |

| 23 May 2015 | Brestzhilstroy (A) | 4–4 (a.e.t.) (4–3 p) | Kletsk (III) | Brest |
| 17:00 | Pashchenko 15', 19'; Khormushko 53'; Yakimchuk 63' | Report | Zuyevich 14'; Mintyuk 16', 35'; Kalechits 38' (pen.) | Stadium: Yunost Stadium; Attendance: 50; Referee: Yevgeniy Koval (Grodno) |
| | Penalties |
| | Bychuk (penalty scored); Kondrashuk (penalty scored); Kravchuk (penalty scored); Khormushko (penalty missed); Shoman (penalty scored) | | (penalty missed) Alekseichik; (penalty scored) Margolenko; (penalty scored) Kulikow; (penalty missed) Trofimenko; (penalty scored) Kalechits |

| 24 May 2015 | Gazovik Vitebsk (A) | 5–3 | Torpedo Mogilev (III) | Vitebsk |
| 16:00 | Chimbur 25', 90+4'; Dorozhkin 40'; Bobrov 55'; Ushinsky 57' | Report | Kolosovskiy 4'; Prudilko 52'; Novikaw 54' | Stadium: Vitebsky CSK; Attendance: 100; Referee: Nikolay Vasko (Minsk) |

== Second round ==
In this round 7 winners of the First Round were joined by 11 remaining Second League clubs and 14 First League clubs to play in 16 fixtures. Two leaders of First League as of the moment of the draw (Isloch Minsk Raion and Smorgon) were given a bye to the Round of 32. The matches were played on 10 June 2015.

| 10 June 2015 | Priozerye Verkhnedvinsk (III) | 0–3 | Gomelzheldortrans (II) | Verkhnedvinsk |
| 17:00 | | Report | Zagvozdin 28'; Gomza 31', 43' | Stadium: Yubileiny Stadium; Attendance: 65; Referee: Vladimir Kuzmin (Minsk) |

| 10 June 2015 | Kolos-Druzhba Baranovichi Raion (III) | 1–2 | Oshmyany (III) | Gorodische |
| 17:00 | Malinovsky 72' (pen.) | Report | Vishnyak 60'; Mikhalevich 89' | Stadium: DYuSSh Stadium; Attendance: 50; Referee: Oleg Cherepnev (Bobruisk) |

| 10 June 2015 | Spartak Shklov (III) | 2–1 | Belita-Viteks Uzda (III) | Shklov |
| 17:30 | Simonchik 24' (pen.); Luzhankov 90+2' | Report | Korsak 12' | Stadium: Spartak Stadium; Attendance: 265; Referee: Yaroslav Komaritskiy (Polotsk) |

| 10 June 2015 | Krutogorye Dzerzhinsk (III) | 1–4 | Bereza-2010 (II) | Dzerzhinsk |
| 18:00 | Klimikhin 72' | Report | Gorbachik 24'; Kaplenko 32' (pen.); Patsko 34'; Gudel 64' | Stadium: City Stadium; Attendance: 250; Referee: Amin Kurgheli (Gomel) |

| 10 June 2015 | Gazovik Vitebsk (A) | 1–6 | Orsha (II) | Vitebsk |
| 18:00 | Chimbur 72' | Report | Kitayev 9'; Prakapenka 32'; Ankinovich 39' (pen.); Dudarev 77'; Smirnow 81'; Sokolko 89' | Stadium: Vitebsky CSK; Attendance: 250; Referee: Vladimir Zholudev (Mogilev) |

| 10 June 2015 | Zarya Krugloye (A) | 0–3 | Baranovichi (II) | Krugloye |
| 18:00 | | Report | Golovchik 42'; Matsyukhevich 50'; Pyatrenka 81' | Stadium: DYuSSh Stadium; Attendance: 400; Referee: Andrey Soroka (Smolevichi) |

| 10 June 2015 | Zhlobin (III) | 1–3 | Rechitsa-2014 (II) | Zhlobin |
| 18:00 | Lagutin 44' | Report | Dimitrov 48', 53', 70' | Stadium: Lokomotiv Stadium; Attendance: 200; Referee: Dmitriy Digilevich (Zhodino) |

| 10 June 2015 | Brestzhilstroy (A) | 1–3 | Krumkachy Minsk (II) | Brest |
| 18:00 | Kondrashuk 40' | Report | Novokovskiy 11'; Bulynenok 83'; Shikavka 90+4' | Stadium: Yunost Stadium; Attendance: 300; Referee: Dmitry Rutko (Grodno) |

| 10 June 2015 | Lyuban (III) | 2–4 | Lida (II) | Lyuban |
| 18:00 | Protasyuk 12'; Voitovich 78' | Report | Chudnovsky 6'; Tatarnikov 39', 45+1', 49' | Stadium: City Stadium; Attendance: 250; Referee: Valentin Bliznyuk (Minsk) |

| 10 June 2015 | Vertikal Kalinkovichi (III) | 1–5 | Slonim (II) | Kalinkovichi |
| 18:00 | Fedorenko 86' | Report | Yuzvovich 10', 20'; Kazlovskiy 24'; Goptarevsky 31' (o.g.); Shakaw 83' | Stadium: SDYuSShOR-2 Stadium; Attendance: 200; Referee: Valery Golomzik (Bobruisk) |

| 10 June 2015 | Molodechno-DYuSSh-4 (III) | 0–5 | Smolevichi-STI (II) | Molodechno |
| 18:00 | | Report | Orochko 49'; Korol 50'; Abd Al-Majid 62' (pen.); Semenov 64'; Khankevich 81' | Stadium: City Stadium; Attendance: 250; Referee: Yevgeniy Naumov (Minsk) |

| 10 June 2015 | Osipovichi (III) | 0–1 | Kobrin (II) | Osipovichi |
| 18:30 | | Report | Chepelevich 11' | Stadium: Yunost Stadium; Attendance: 300; Referee: Pavel Rudenkov (Gomel) |

| 10 June 2015 | Torpedo Minsk (III) | 0–4 | Khimik Svetlogorsk (II) | Oktyabrskiy |
| 18:30 | | Report | Shukelovich 40'; Lepin 60'; Sidarenka 82'; Kotin 86' (pen.) | Stadium: FOK Oktyabrskiy; Attendance: 120; Referee: Sergey Stetsurin (Brest) |

| 10 June 2015 | Volna Pinsk (III) | 2–0 | Zvezda-BGU Minsk (II) | Pinsk |
| 19:00 | Khamitsevich 83', 90' | Report | | Stadium: Volna Stadium; Attendance: 500; Referee: Vladimir Ischenko (Rechitsa) |

| 10 June 2015 | AK Zhdanovichi (III) | 1–6 | Gorodeya (II) | Minsk |
| 19:00 | Puvulskiy 74' | Report | Pyatrow 20', 26'; Pavlyuchek 48'; Saroka 58'; Lyasyuk 61'; Komarov 65' | Stadium: RCOP-BGU Stadium; Attendance: 200; Referee: Artur Kunay (Brest) |

| 10 June 2015 | Luch Minsk (III) | 1–3 | Dnepr Mogilev (II) | Minsk |
| 19:00 | Vileyto 45' | Report | Bordukov 14'; Khodenkov 31'; Baldykov 90+2' | Stadium: SOK Olimpiysky; Attendance: 700; Referee: Pavel Koronets (Zhodino) |

== Round of 32 ==
In this round 16 winners of the Second Round were joined by 2 remaining First League clubs and 14 Premier League clubs to play in 16 two-legged fixtures. The matches were played on 16–19 July and 1–2 August 2015.

| Team 1 | Agg. | Team 2 | 1st leg | 2nd leg |
|---|---|---|---|---|
| Baranovichi (II) | 1–3 | Slavia Mozyr | 1–1 | 0–2 |
| Dnepr Mogilev (II) | 2–7 | Naftan Novopolotsk | 0–4 | 2–3 |
| Gomelzheldortrans (II) | 3–4 | Belshina Bobruisk | 1–2 | 2–2 |
| Oshmyany (III) | 2–8 | Granit Mikashevichi | 1–3 | 1–5 |
| Dinamo Brest | 5–4 | Bereza-2010 (II) | 3–1 | 2–3 |
| Kobrin (II) | 0–6 | Gomel | 0–2 | 0–4 |
| Krumkachy Minsk (II) | 2–6 | Slutsk | 2–2 | 0–4 |
| Lida (II) | 3–5 | Smorgon (II) | 0–2 | 3–3 |
| Gorodeya (II) | 0–2 | Minsk | 0–0 | 0–2 |
| Khimik Svetlogorsk (II) | 2–5 | Isloch Minsk Raion (II) | 0–2 | 2–3 |
| Rechitsa-2014 (II) | 0–6 | Neman Grodno | 0–0 | 0–6 |
| Spartak Shklov (III) | 2–8 | BATE Borisov | 2–1 | 0–7 |
| Volna Pinsk (III) | 1–5 | Vitebsk | 1–3 | 0–2 |
| Orsha (II) | 1–16 | Torpedo-BelAZ Zhodino | 0–5 | 1–11 |
| Slonim (II) | 2–18 | Shakhtyor Soligorsk | 1–10 | 1–8 |
| Dinamo Minsk | 7–2 | Smolevichi-STI (II) | 2–0 | 5–2 |

1. Order of legs switched after original draw per mutual agreement.

=== First leg ===
| 16 July 2015 | Baranovichi (II) | 1–1 | Slavia Mozyr | Baranovichi |
| 18:30 | Artyukh 11' | Report | Trapashko 51' | Stadium: Lokomotiv Stadium; Attendance: 2,100; Referee: Vitaly Sevostyanik (Grodno) |

| 16 July 2015 | Dnepr Mogilev (II) | 0–4 | Naftan Novopolotsk | Mogilev |
| 19:30 | | Report | Volkov 6', 15'; Shkabara 20'; Shuhunkow 44' | Stadium: Spartak Stadium; Attendance: 700; Referee: Aleksei Kulbakov (Gomel) |

| 17 July 2015 | Gomelzheldortrans (II) | 1–2 | Belshina Bobruisk | Gomel |
| 18:30 | Gomza 36' | Report | Skvernyuk 15'; Halyuza 39' | Stadium: SDYuSShOR-8 Stadium; Attendance: 420; Referee: Nikita Pyreyev (Minsk) |

| 18 July 2015 | Oshmyany (III) | 1–3 | Granit Mikashevichi | Oshmyany |
| 15:30 | Mikhalevich 72' | Report | Nevmyvaka 12'; Osadchyi 19'; Asipenka 45+1' | Stadium: FOK Stadium; Attendance: 540; Referee: Dmitry Dmitriyev (Fanipol) |

| 18 July 2015 | Dinamo Brest | 3–1 | Bereza-2010 (II) | Brest |
| 16:00 | Solovey 50'; Premudrov 56'; Dzyameshka 90' | Report | Patsko 65' | Stadium: OSK Brestskiy; Attendance: 1,000; Referee: Dmitry Dolya (Grodno) |

| 18 July 2015 | Kobrin (II) | 0–2 | Gomel | Kobrin |
| 16:30 | | Report | Yanchenko 10', 24' | Stadium: Yunost Stadium; Attendance: 500; Referee: Dmitriy Digilevich (Zhodino) |

| 18 July 2015 | Krumkachy Minsk (II) | 2–2 | Slutsk | Minsk |
| 17:00 | Ivanow 45' (pen.); Novokovskiy 90' | Report | An.Zaleski 13'; Zyanko 18' | Stadium: SOK Olimpiysky; Attendance: 600; Referee: Vadim Panchenko (Mogilev) |

| 18 July 2015 | Lida (II) | 0–2 | Smorgon (II) | Lida |
| 17:30 | | Report | Kulakovsky 38' (o.g.); Kalinin 51' | Stadium: Start Stadium; Attendance: 600; Referee: Denis Scherbakov (Minsk) |

| 18 July 2015 | Gorodeya (II) | 0–0 | Minsk | Gorodeya |
| 17:30 | | Report | | Stadium: Gorodeya Stadium; Attendance: 850; Referee: Igor Kruk (Molodechno) |

| 18 July 2015 | Khimik Svetlogorsk (II) | 0–2 | Isloch Minsk Raion (II) | Svetlogorsk |
| 18:00 | | Report | Tsishkevich 51'; Alumona 55' | Stadium: Bumazhnik Stadium; Attendance: 500; Referee: Viktor Shimusik (Osipovichi) |

| 18 July 2015 | Rechitsa-2014 (II) | 0–0 | Neman Grodno | Rechitsa |
| 18:00 | | Report | | Stadium: Central Stadium; Attendance: 400; Referee: Andrey Divakov (Mogilev) |

| 18 July 2015 | Spartak Shklov (III) | 2–1 | BATE Borisov | Shklov |
| 18:30 | Klimov 50'; Levshukov 88' | Report | Anufryyew 42' | Stadium: Spartak Stadium; Attendance: 1,500; Referee: Andrey Vasilevich (Mozyr) |

| 18 July 2015 | Volna Pinsk (III) | 1–3 | Vitebsk | Pinsk |
| 19:00 | Gradoboyev 74' (pen.) | Report | Baranok 45+1'; Aleksandrovich 54'; Melnik 81' | Stadium: Volna Stadium; Attendance: 655; Referee: Andrey Soroka (Smolevichi) |

| 19 July 2015 | Orsha (II) | 0–5 | Torpedo-BelAZ Zhodino | Orsha |
| 15:30 | | Report | Datsenko 22'; V.Hleb 53'; Selyava 56'; Dzemidovich 70', 90+1' | Stadium: City Stadium; Attendance: 2,100; Referee: Sergey Tsinkevich (Osipovichi) |

| 19 July 2015 | Slonim (II) | 1–10 | Shakhtyor Soligorsk | Slonim |
| 17:30 | Latyshev 68' | Report | Vyarheychyk 6', 18', 23', 55'; Kamarowski 47', 85', 89'; Martynyuk 54'; Čović 88'; Kavalyow 90+2' | Stadium: Yunost Stadium; Attendance: 1,900; Referee: Yevgeniy Naumov (Minsk) |

| 19 July 2015 | Dinamo Minsk | 2–0 | Smolevichi-STI (II) | Minsk |
| 18:30 | Karytska 41'; Veratsila 66' | Report | | Stadium: Traktor Stadium; Attendance: 500; Referee: Oleg Murashkevich (Novopolotsk) |

=== Second leg ===
| 1 August 2015 | Naftan Novopolotsk | 3–2 (7–2 agg.) | Dnepr Mogilev (II) | Novopolotsk |
| 15:30 | Shkabara 63' (pen.); Volkov 65'; Karpovich 90+1' | Report | Naumov 21' (o.g.); Sazankow 39' | Stadium: Atlant Stadium; Attendance: 250; Referee: Andrey Soroka (Smolevichi) |

| 1 August 2015 | Isloch Minsk Raion (II) | 3–2 (5–2 agg.) | Khimik Svetlogorsk (II) | Minsk |
| 15:30 | Lynko 11'; Yasyukevich 52'; Lebedzew 86' | Report | Kotin 41' (pen.); Rochev 76' (o.g.) | Stadium: SOK Olimpiysky; Attendance: 100; Referee: Sergey Tsinkevich (Osipovichi) |

| 1 August 2015 | Vitebsk | 2–0 (5–1 agg.) | Volna Pinsk (III) | Vitebsk |
| 19:00 | Salavey 40'; Radzhabov 59' | Report | | Stadium: Vitebsky CSK; Attendance: 800; Referee: Andrey Divakov (Mogilev) |

| 1 August 2015 | Bereza-2010 (II) | 3–2 (4–5 agg.) | Dinamo Brest | Bereza |
| 16:30 | Patsko 44'; Belyavsky 53'; Gorbachik 81' | Report | Kavalewski 4' (pen.); Pampukha 88' | Stadium: DYuSSh-1 Stadium; Attendance: 1,300; Referee: Vitaly Sevostyanik (Grodno) |

| 1 August 2015 | Slutsk | 4–0 (6–2 agg.) | Krumkachy Minsk (II) | Slutsk |
| 17:30 | Zubovich 39'; Hlyabko 43'; Bamba 63' (pen.); Sebai 74' | Report | | Stadium: City Stadium; Attendance: 950; Referee: Oleg Murashkevich (Novopolotsk) |

| 1 August 2015 | Smorgon (II) | 3–3 (5–2 agg.) | Lida (II) | Smorgon |
| 17:30 | Kryvobok 16'; Talkanitsa 56'; Dzegtseraw 65' | Report | Korelov 36'; Lozko 63'; Shorats 81' | Stadium: Yunost Stadium; Attendance: 700; Referee: Igor Kruk (Molodechno) |

| 1 August 2015 | Neman Grodno | 6–0 (6–0 agg.) | Rechitsa-2014 (II) | Grodno |
| 18:00 | Kavalyuk 36'; Soro 53'; Kontsevoy 70'; Bombel 75'; Zhurnevich 79'; Savitski 89' | Report | | Stadium: Neman Stadium; Attendance: 1,000; Referee: Nikita Pyreyev (Minsk) |

| 1 August 2015 | Belshina Bobruisk | 2–2 (4–3 agg.) | Gomelzheldortrans (II) | Bobruisk |
| 18:30 | Turlin 64'; Shramchenko 84' (pen.) | Report | Pyrkh 53'; Gomza 76' | Stadium: Spartak Stadium; Attendance: 700; Referee: Dmitry Dmitriyev (Fanipol) |

| 1 August 2015 | Granit Mikashevichi | 5–1 (8–2 agg.) | Oshmyany (III) | Luninets |
| 18:30 | Sherakow 26'; Habovda 35' (pen.); Ignatenko 50', 59'; Asipenka 64' | Report | Vishnyak 21' | Stadium: Polesye Stadium; Attendance: 400; Referee: Vladimir Ischenko (Rechitsa) |

| 1 August 2015 | Minsk | 2–0 (2–0 agg.) | Gorodeya (II) | Minsk |
| 19:30 | Makas 19'; Pushnyakov 39' | Report | | Stadium: FC Minsk Stadium; Attendance: 1,500; Referee: Vadim Panchenko (Mogilev) |

| 1 August 2015 | BATE Borisov | 7–0 (8–2 agg.) | Spartak Shklov (III) | Borisov |
| 19:30 | M.Valadzko 41'; Ryas 43'; Signevich 45'; Gordeichuk 57', 74', 86', 90' | Report | | Stadium: City Stadium; Attendance: 3,200; Referee: Aleksei Kulbakov (Gomel) |

| 2 August 2015 | Torpedo-BelAZ Zhodino | 11–1 (16–1 agg.) | Orsha (II) | Zhodino |
| 15:30 | Pankavets 14'; Khachaturyan 19', 62'; Skavysh 23'; Dzemidovich 25', 34'; D.Platonaw 59', 74', 84'; V.Hleb 63'; Pavlovets 68' (pen.) | Report | Znak 27' (pen.) | Stadium: Torpedo Stadium; Attendance: 800; Referee: Mikhail Lavsky (Gomel) |

| 2 August 2015 | Smolevichi-STI (II) | 2–5 (2–7 agg.) | Dinamo Minsk | Smolevichi |
| 17:00 | Khankevich 39'; Kulbako 43' | Report | Neacșa 27'; Bulyga 59', 90'; Yarotsky 63'; Saramakha 83' | Stadium: Ozyorny Stadium; Attendance: 1,100; Referee: Denis Scherbakov (Minsk) |

| 2 August 2015 | Slavia Mozyr | 2–0 (3–1 agg.) | Baranovichi (II) | Mozyr |
| 17:30 | Grechishko 31'; Varankow 90+3' | Report | | Stadium: Yunost Stadium; Attendance: 1,150; Referee: Viktor Shimusik (Osipovichi) |

| 2 August 2015 | Shakhtyor Soligorsk | 8–1 (18–2 agg.) | Slonim (II) | Soligorsk |
| 18:00 | Rudzik 3'; Kamarowski 9'; Yanush 40', 43', 45'; Vyarheychyk 67', 83'; Kuzmyanok 74' | Report | Shcharbakow 47' | Stadium: Stroitel Stadium; Attendance: 510; Referee: Dmitry Yevnevich (Minsk) |

| 2 August 2015 | Gomel | 4–0 (6–0 agg.) | Kobrin (II) | Gomel |
| 18:30 | Milevsky 53'; Sulim 72'; Bliznyuk 78' (pen.); Yakhno 80' | Report | | Stadium: Central Stadium; Attendance: 1,800; Referee: Valeriy Golomzik (Bobruisk) |

== Round of 16 ==
In this round 16 winners of the previous were paired into 8 two-legged fixtures. The draw was conducted on 4 August 2015.

| Team 1 | Agg. | Team 2 | 1st leg | 2nd leg |
|---|---|---|---|---|
| Minsk | 4–4 (a) | Slavia Mozyr | 2–1 | 2–3 |
| Naftan Novopolotsk | 3–2 | Dinamo Brest | 3–1 | 0–1 |
| Vitebsk | 2–4 | Shakhtyor Soligorsk | 1–1 | 1–3 |
| Gomel | 0–5 | Slutsk | 0–3 | 0–2 |
| Smorgon (II) | 1–9 | Torpedo-BelAZ Zhodino | 0–5 | 1–4 |
| Belshina Bobruisk | 4–1 | Isloch Minsk Raion (II) | 3–0 | 1–1 |
| BATE Borisov | 8–1 | Granit Mikashevichi | 5–0 | 3–1 |
| Dinamo Minsk | 2–1 | Neman Grodno | 1–1 | 1–0 |

1. Order of legs switched after original draw per mutual agreement.

=== First leg ===
| 8 September 2015 | Minsk | 2–1 | Slavia Mozyr | Minsk |
| 18:00 | Kovel 13'; Khvashchynski 63' | Report | Trapashko 43' | Stadium: FC Minsk Stadium; Attendance: 550; Referee: Vadim Panchenko (Mogilev) |

| 12 November 2015 | Naftan Novopolotsk | 3–1 | Dinamo Brest | Novopolotsk |
| 14:00 | Suchkow 14', 37'; Yelezarenko 83' | Report | Kavalewski 20' | Stadium: Atlant Stadium; Attendance: 200; Referee: Dmitry Dmitriyev (Fanipol) |

| 14 November 2015 | Vitebsk | 1–1 | Shakhtyor Soligorsk | Vitebsk |
| 14:00 | Postnikov 90+2' | Report | Yanush 45+1' | Stadium: Vitebsky CSK; Attendance: 300; Referee: Aleksei Kulbakov (Gomel) |

| 14 November 2015 | Gomel | 0–3 | Slutsk | Gomel |
| 15:00 | | Report | Bamba 34'; Kurlovich 55'; Zubovich 72' | Stadium: Central Stadium; Attendance: 800; Referee: Oleg Murashkevich (Novopolotsk) |

| 19 November 2015 | Smorgon (II) | 0–5 | Torpedo-BelAZ Zhodino | Smorgon |
| 14:00 | | Report | V.Hleb 19', 24', 75'; Skavysh 46', 59' | Stadium: Yunost Stadium; Attendance: 600; Referee: Vadim Panchenko (Mogilev) |

| 19 November 2015 | Belshina Bobruisk | 3–0 | Isloch Minsk Raion (II) | Bobruisk |
| 14:00 | Bobukh 7'; Shramchenko 42' (pen.), 75' | Report | | Stadium: Spartak Stadium; Attendance: 650; Referee: Vladimir Ischenko (Rechitsa) |

| 20 November 2015 | BATE Borisov | 5–0 | Granit Mikashevichi | Borisov |
| 18:00 | Mazalewski 14', 72'; Karnitsky 30'; Aleksiyevich 40'; Gordeichuk 88' | Report | | Stadium: City Stadium; Attendance: 1,680; Referee: Aleksei Kulbakov (Gomel) |

| 21 November 2015 | Dinamo Minsk | 1–1 | Neman Grodno | Minsk |
| 14:00 | Bećiraj 76' (pen.) | Report | Kontsevoy 90' | Stadium: Traktor Stadium; Attendance: 950; Referee: Andrey Soroka (Smolevichi) |

=== Second leg ===
| 15 November 2015 | Slavia Mozyr | 3–2 (4–4(a) agg.) | Minsk | Mozyr |
| 14:00 | Tarasenka 4'; Katlyaraw 60'; Varankow 84' | Report | Makas 30' (pen.); Vasilyew 59' | Stadium: Yunost Stadium; Attendance: 750; Referee: Viktor Shimusik (Osipovichi) |

| 16 November 2015 | Dinamo Brest | 1–0 (2–3 agg.) | Naftan Novopolotsk | Brest |
| 13:00 | Perepechko 20' | Report | | Stadium: OSK Brestskiy; Attendance: 250; Referee: Sergey Tsinkevich (Osipovichi) |

| 18 November 2015 | Shakhtyor Soligorsk | 3–1 (4–2 agg.) | Vitebsk | Soligorsk |
| 18:00 | Yanush 8' (pen.), 32'; Kuzmyanok 75' | Report | Kashewski 73' (pen.) | Stadium: Stroitel Stadium; Attendance: 650; Referee: Dmitry Dolya (Grodno) |

| 21 November 2015 | Slutsk | 2–0 (5–0 agg.) | Gomel | Slutsk |
| 14:00 | Zubovich 21'; Aliseiko 53' | Report | | Stadium: City Stadium; Attendance: 870; Referee: Andrey Divakov (Mogilev) |

| 23 November 2015 | Isloch Minsk Raion (II) | 1–1 (1–4 agg.) | Belshina Bobruisk | Minsk |
| 17:00 | Ryzhko 90+2' | Report | Bohunov 10' | Stadium: FC Minsk Stadium; Attendance: 100; Referee: Denis Scherbakov (Minsk) |

| 25 November 2015 | Torpedo-BelAZ Zhodino | 4–1 (9–1 agg.) | Smorgon (II) | Zhodino |
| 14:00 | Skavysh 10', 49', 77'; V.Hleb 64' (pen.) | Report | Krot 34' | Stadium: Torpedo Stadium; Attendance: 400; Referee: Nikita Pyreyev (Minsk) |

| 29 November 2015 | Granit Mikashevichi | 1–3 (1–8 agg.) | BATE Borisov | Luninets |
| 14:00 | Sherakow 51' | Report | Jevtić 17'; Karnitsky 39'; Nikolić 42' | Stadium: Polesye Stadium; Attendance: 750; Referee: Vitaly Sevostyanik (Grodno) |

| 30 November 2015 | Neman Grodno | 0–1 (1–2 agg.) | Dinamo Minsk | Grodno |
| 18:00 | | Report | Bećiraj 53' | Stadium: Neman Stadium; Attendance: 1,500; Referee: Sergey Tsinkevich (Osipovichi) |

== Quarter-finals ==
The first legs were played on 19 and 20 March 2016 and the second legs were played on 6 April 2016.

| Team 1 | Agg. | Team 2 | 1st leg | 2nd leg |
|---|---|---|---|---|
| Minsk | 2–0 | Shakhtyor Soligorsk | 2–0 | 0–0 |
| BATE Borisov | 3–0 | Slutsk | 1–0 | 2–0 |
| Dinamo Minsk | 1–2 | Torpedo-BelAZ Zhodino | 1–0 | 0–2 (aet) |
| Naftan Novopolotsk | 4–2 | Belshina Bobruisk | 1–1 | 3–1 (aet) |

=== First leg ===
| 19 March 2016 | Minsk | 2–0 | Shakhtyor Soligorsk | Minsk |
| 13:00 | Kovel 52'; Sachywka 76' (pen.) | Report | | Stadium: FC Minsk Stadium; Attendance: 800; Referee: Sergey Tsinkevich (Osipovichi) |

| 19 March 2016 | BATE Borisov | 1–0 | Slutsk | Borisov |
| 18:00 | M.Valadzko 90+3' | Report | | Stadium: Borisov Arena; Attendance: 4,186; Referee: Vadim Panchenko (Mogilev) |

| 20 March 2016 | Dinamo Minsk | 1–0 | Torpedo-BelAZ Zhodino | Minsk |
| 14:00 | Begunov 43' | Report | | Stadium: FC Minsk Stadium; Attendance: 1,300; Referee: Aleksei Kulbakov (Gomel) |

| 20 March 2016 | Naftan Novopolotsk | 1–1 | Belshina Bobruisk | Novopolotsk |
| 16:00 | Shuhunkow 85' | Report | Fameyeh 64' | Stadium: Atlant Stadium; Attendance: 480; Referee: Denis Scherbakov (Minsk) |

=== Second leg ===
| 6 April 2016 | Slutsk | 0–2 (0–3 agg.) | BATE Borisov | Slutsk |
| 16:30 | | Report | Mazalewski 11'; Ivanić 54' | Stadium: City Stadium; Attendance: 1,520; Referee: Mikhail Lavsky (Gomel) |

| 6 April 2016 | Belshina Bobruisk | 1–3 (a.e.t.) (2–4 agg.) | Naftan Novopolotsk | Bobruisk |
| 17:00 | Matsveenka 47' | Report | Teverov 32', 92', 113' | Stadium: Aleksandr Prokopenko Stadium; Attendance: 1,000; Referee: Vladimir Ischenko (Rechitsa) |

| 6 April 2016 | Shakhtyor Soligorsk | 0–0 (0–2 agg.) | Minsk | Soligorsk |
| 18:30 | | Report | | Stadium: Stroitel Stadium; Attendance: 1,500; Referee: Denis Scherbakov (Minsk) |

| 6 April 2016 | Torpedo-BelAZ Zhodino | 2–0 (a.e.t.) (2–1 agg.) | Dinamo Minsk | Zhodino |
| 19:00 | Dzemidovich 12'; Klopotskiy 113' | Report | | Stadium: Torpedo Stadium; Attendance: 1,150; Referee: Vadim Panchenko (Mogilev) |

== Semifinals ==
The first legs were played on 20 April 2016 and the second legs will be played on 4 May 2016.

| Team 1 | Agg. | Team 2 | 1st leg | 2nd leg |
|---|---|---|---|---|
| Naftan Novopolotsk | 2–2 (a) | BATE Borisov | 2–2 | 0–0 |
| Torpedo-BelAZ Zhodino | 2–1 | Minsk | 1–1 | 1–0 |

=== First leg ===
| 20 April 2016 | Naftan Novopolotsk | 2–2 | BATE Borisov | Novopolotsk |
| 18:00 | Harbachow 27'; Yakimov 81' | Report | Gordeichuk 23', 64' (pen.) | Stadium: Atlant Stadium; Attendance: 2,500; Referee: Denis Scherbakov (Minsk) |

| 20 April 2016 | Torpedo-BelAZ Zhodino | 1–1 | Minsk | Zhodino |
| 20:00 | Skavysh 10' | Report | Bessmertny 49' | Stadium: Torpedo Stadium; Attendance: 740; Referee: Igor Kruk (Molodechno) |

=== Second leg ===
| 4 May 2016 | Minsk | 0–1 (1–2 agg.) | Torpedo-BelAZ Zhodino | Minsk |
| 18:00 | | Report | Klopotskiy 16' | Stadium: FC Minsk Stadium; Attendance: 1,150; Referee: Vadim Panchenko (Mogilev) |

| 4 May 2016 | BATE Borisov | 0–0 ((a)2–2 agg.) | Naftan Novopolotsk | Borisov |
| 19:30 | | Report | | Stadium: Borisov Arena; Attendance: 4,437; Referee: Aleksei Kulbakov (Gomel) |

== Final ==
The final match was played on 21 May 2016 at OSK Brestsky in Brest.

21 May 2016
18:00

| BATE Borisov | 0–0 (a.e.t.) | Torpedo-BelAZ Zhodino |
|---|---|---|
| | Report |
Penalties
| Ivanić (penalty scored); Yablonskiy (penalty missed); Stasevich (penalty missed); M.Valadzko (penalty scored); Dubra (penalty missed) | 2–3 | (penalty missed) Klopotskiy; (penalty scored) Kvashuk; (penalty missed) Chumak; (penalty scored) Shapoval; (penalty scored) Trapashko |

OSK Brestsky, Brest
Attendance: 4,500
Referee: Aleksei Kulbakov (Gomel)

BATE:
| GK | 16 | (Belarus) Syarhey Chernik |
| RB | 15 | (Belarus) Maksim Zhavnerchik |
| CB | 19 | (Serbia) Nemanja Milunović |
| CB | 4 | (Latvia) Kaspars Dubra |
| LB | 33 | (Belarus) Dzyanis Palyakow | (yellow card) 67' |
| DM | 77 | (Belarus) Yury Kendysh | (yellow card) 81' | (substituted off) 108' |
| RM | 17 | (Belarus) Alyaksey Ryas | | (substituted off) 82' |
| CM | 10 | (Serbia) Mirko Ivanić |
| CM | 5 | (Belarus) Yevgeniy Yablonskiy |
| LM | 22 | (Belarus) Ihar Stasevich (c) |
| FW | 62 | (Belarus) Mikhail Gordeichuk | | (substituted off) 115' |
Substitutes:
| GK | 34 | (Belarus) Artem Soroko |
| DF | 3 | (Belarus) Vital Hayduchyk |
| MF | 8 | (Belarus) Alyaksandr Valadzko | (yellow card) 118' | (substituted on) 108' |
| FW | 11 | (Belarus) Dmitry Antilevsky | | (substituted on) 115' |
| DF | 14 | (Belarus) Artur Pikk |
| FW | 20 | (Belarus) Vitali Rodionov |
| DF | 42 | (Belarus) Maksim Valadzko | | (substituted on) 82' |
Manager:
(Belarus) Alyaksandr Yermakovich

TORPEDO-BELAZ:
| GK | 23 | (Belarus) Valery Fomichev |
| RB | 6 | (Belarus) Alyaksey Pankavets (c) |
| CB | 21 | (Belarus) Valery Karshakevich |
| CB | 18 | (Belarus) Uladzimir Shcherba |
| CB | 2 | (Belarus) Artsyom Chelyadzinski |
| LB | 30 | (Belarus) Pavel Chelyadko | (substituted off) 91' |
| RM | 13 | (Belarus) Maksim Skavysh |
| CM | 7 | (Ukraine) Serhiy Shapoval |
| CM | 28 | (Ukraine) Yevhen Chumak |
| LM | 17 | (Ukraine) Anton Holenkov | (substituted off) 115' |
| FW | 97 | (Belarus) Vadzim Dzemidovich | (substituted off) 80' |
Substitutes:
| GK | 35 | (Belarus) Yahor Hatkevich |
| DF | 4 | (Belarus) Yevgeniy Klopotskiy | (substituted on) 91' |
| FW | 10 | (Belarus) Gennadi Bliznyuk |
| DF | 22 | (Belarus) Aleksandr Pavlovets |
| MF | 31 | (Belarus) Yury Pavlyukovets |
| MF | 77 | (Ukraine) Vitaliy Kvashuk | (substituted on) 80' |
| FW | 90 | (Belarus) Denis Trapashko | (substituted on) 115' |
Manager:
(Belarus) Igor Kriushenko
