= 2016–17 Debreceni VSC season =

Debrecen
2016–17 season
- Manager: Elemér Kondás (until 25 July 2016); András Herczeg (caretaker, from 25 July 2016 to 8 August 2016); Leonel Pontes (from 8 August 2016 to 22 May 2017); András Herczeg (caretaker, from 22 May 2017)
- Stadium: Nagyerdei Stadion
- Nemzeti Bajnokság I: 8th
- Magyar Kupa: Round of 128
- UEFA Europa League: Second qualifying round
- Top goalscorer: League: Dávid Holman (7); All: Dávid Holman (8)
- Highest home attendance: 8,632 v La Fiorita (7 July 2016, UEFA Europa League)
- Lowest home attendance: 1,685 v Honvéd (20 September 2016, Nemzeti Bajnokság I)
- Average home league attendance: 3,406
- Biggest win: 5–0 v La Fiorita (Away, 30 June 2016, UEFA Europa League)
- Biggest defeat: 1–5 v Videoton (Away, 21 August 2016, Nemzeti Bajnokság I)

The 2016–17 season was Debreceni Vasutas Sport Club's 43rd competitive season, 24th consecutive season in the Nemzeti Bajnokság I and 104th season in existence as a football club. In addition to the domestic league, Debrecen participated in that season's editions of the Magyar Kupa and the UEFA Europa League.

== Squad ==
Squad at end of season

Note: Flags indicate national team as defined under FIFA eligibility rules; some limited exceptions apply. Players may hold more than one non-FIFA nationality.

No.	Pos.	Nation	Player
1	GK	CRO	Ivan Kelava
2	DF	HUN	Attila Osváth
3	DF	HUN	Csaba Szatmári
4	MF	ROU	Ioan Filip
5	DF	HUN	Péter Szilvási
8	MF	HUN	Dániel Tőzsér
10	MF	HUN	Dávid Holman
11	MF	HUN	János Ferenczi
15	DF	HUN	Dániel Völgyi
17	DF	HUN	Norbert Mészáros
18	FW	NGA	Derick Ogbu
19	MF	CMR	Justin Mengolo
22	MF	VEN	Frank Feltscher

No.	Pos.	Nation	Player
23	FW	HUN	Dániel Bereczki
24	MF	SRB	Danilo Sekulić
25	DF	SRB	Dušan Brković
28	DF	HUN	Zoltán Nagy
37	DF	HUN	Szabolcs Barna
42	FW	SRB	Norbert Könyves
44	GK	SRB	Branislav Danilović
66	FW	HUN	Nándor Kóródi
77	DF	SRB	Aleksandar Jovanović
87	GK	HUN	István Verpecz
90	FW	BIH	Haris Handžić
91	FW	KOR	Suk Hyun-jun

== Transfers ==
=== Transfers in ===
Transfer window	Pos.	No.	Player	From
Summer	DF	—	(Hungary) Krisztián Balogh	Youth team
Summer	FW	—	(Hungary) Péter Bíró	Youth team
Summer	DF	—	(Hungary) Tibor Bokros	(Hungary) Balmazújváros
Summer	FW	—	(Hungary) Márk Kabály	Youth team
Summer	FW	—	(Hungary) Krisztián Kerekes	Youth team
Summer	GK	—	(Hungary) Péter Kovács	Youth team
Summer	DF	—	(Hungary) Viktor Koval	(Hungary) Dunaújváros
Summer	MF	—	(Hungary) Achilles Kozák	Youth team
Summer	FW	—	(Hungary) Jan Maruscsák	Youth team
Summer	FW	—	(Hungary) Dániel Zsóri	Youth team
Summer	MF	4	(Romania) Ioan Filip	(Romania) Viitorul Constanța
Summer	MF	8	(Hungary) Dániel Tőzsér	Free agent (Note: Previous club Queens Park Rangers.)
Summer	DF	15	(Hungary) Dániel Völgyi	(Hungary) Gyirmót
Summer	FW	18	(Nigeria) Derick Ogbu	Free agent (Note: Previous club Ventforet Kofu.)
Summer	MF	24	(Serbia) Danilo Sekulić	(Serbia) Vojvodina
Summer	MF	27	(Slovakia) Karol Mészáros	(Hungary) Puskás Akadémia
Summer	FW	33	(Slovakia) Róbert Vittek	Free agent (Note: Previous club Slovan Bratislava.)
Summer	FW	42	(Serbia) Norbert Könyves	(Hungary) Vasas
Summer	MF	70	(Ukraine) Ivan Bobko	Free agent (Note: Previous club Metalist Kharkiv.)
Winter	MF	—	(Hungary) Richárd Csősz	Youth team
Winter	GK	1	(Croatia) Ivan Kelava	Free agent (Note: Previous club Granada.)
Winter	MF	19	(Cameroon) Justin Mengolo	Free agent (Note: Previous club Levski Sofia.)
Winter	MF	22	(Venezuela) Frank Feltscher	Free agent (Note: Previous club AEL Limassol.)
Winter	MF	70	(Hungary) Kevin Nagy	Youth team
Winter	FW	90	(Bosnia and Herzegovina) Haris Handžić	(Croatia) Rijeka

=== Transfers out ===
Transfer window	Pos.	No.	Player	To
Summer	GK	—	(Hungary) Máté Deczki	(England) Stoke City
Summer	FW	—	(Hungary) Bálint Kártik	(Hungary) Nyíregyháza
Summer	GK	1	(Hungary) Balázs Slakta	Released
Summer	FW	10	(Hungary) Tibor Tisza	(Hungary) Nyíregyháza
Summer	DF	13	(Hungary) Pál Lázár	Released (Note: Joined Diósgyőr.)
Summer	FW	15	(Hungary) Tamás Kertész	(Hungary) Kaposvár
Summer	DF	18	(Hungary) Péter Máté	(Hungary) Nyíregyháza
Summer	MF	21	(Hungary) Bence Ludánszki	(Hungary) Kaposvár
Summer	GK	22	(Croatia) Božidar Radošević	(Iran) Persepolis
Summer	FW	26	(Senegal) Ibrahima Sidibe	Released (Note: Joined Sporting Hasselt.)
Summer	MF	27	(Hungary) Ádám Bódi	(Hungary) Videoton
Summer	MF	33	(Hungary) József Varga	(Hungary) Videoton
Summer	FW	39	(France) Adamo Coulibaly	Released
Summer	DF	69	(Hungary) Mihály Korhut	(Israel) Hapoel Be'er Sheva
Summer	FW	70	(Hungary) Tamás Kulcsár	(Hungary) Vasas
Winter	DF	—	(Hungary) Tamás Sándor Jr.	(Hungary) Cigánd
Winter	FW	33	(Slovakia) Róbert Vittek	Released (Note: Joined Slovan Bratislava.)
Winter	MF	55	(Hungary) Péter Szakály	Released (Note: Joined Puskás Akadémia.)
Winter	MF	70	(Ukraine) Ivan Bobko	Released
Winter	FW	91	(Netherlands) Geoffrey Castillion	Released (Note: Joined Víkingur Reykjavík.)

=== Loans in ===
Transfer window	Pos.	No.	Player	From	End date
Summer	GK	44	(Serbia) Branislav Danilović	(Hungary) Puskás Akadémia	End of season
Winter	DF	2	(Hungary) Attila Osváth	(Hungary) Vasas	End of season
Winter	FW	91	(South Korea) Suk Hyun-jun	(Portugal) Porto	End of season

=== Loans out ===
Transfer window	Pos.	No.	Player	To	End date
Summer	DF	—	(Hungary) Krisztián Balogh	(Hungary) Balmazújváros	End of season
Summer	DF	—	(Hungary) Tibor Bokros	(Hungary) Balmazújváros	End of season
Summer	MF	—	(Hungary) Kevin Varga	(Hungary) Balmazújváros	Middle of season
Summer	FW	15	(Hungary) Bence Sós	(Hungary) Mezőkövesd	End of season
Summer	DF	37	(Hungary) Szabolcs Barna	(Hungary) Nyíregyháza	Middle of season
Summer	DF	37	(Hungary) Ákos Kinyik	(Hungary) Budaörs	End of season
Summer	DF	53	(Hungary) Péter Berdó	(Hungary) Szolnok	End of season
Winter	MF	—	(Hungary) Kevin Varga	(Hungary) Cigánd	End of season
Winter	DF	14	(Hungary) Krisztián Kuti	(Hungary) Cigánd	End of season
Winter	FW	20	(Hungary) Tamás Takács	(Hungary) Nyíregyháza	End of season
Winter	MF	27	(Slovakia) Karol Mészáros	(Hungary) Haladás	End of season

== Competitions ==
=== Overview ===
Competition	First match	Last match	Starting round	Final position	Record							
Competition	First match	Last match	Starting round	Final position	Pld	W	D	L	GF	GA	GD	Win %
Nemzeti Bajnokság I	17 July 2016	27 May 2017	Matchday 1	8th	33	11	8	14	42	46	−4	33.33
Magyar Kupa	14 September 2016	14 September 2016	Round of 128	Round of 128	1	0	0	1	0	1	−1	0.00
UEFA Europa League	30 June 2016	21 July 2016	First qualifying round	Second qualifying round	4	2	0	2	8	3	+5	50.00
Total					38	13	8	17	50	50	+0	34.21

Source: Competitions

=== Nemzeti Bajnokság I ===
==== League table ====
Pos	Team	Pld	W	D	L	GF	GA	GD	Pts
6	Haladás	33	12	7	14	42	46	−4	43
7	Újpest	33	10	12	11	47	51	−4	42
8	Debrecen	33	11	8	14	42	46	−4	41
9	Mezőkövesd	33	10	10	13	39	54	−15	40
10	Diósgyőr	33	10	7	16	39	58	−19	37

Source: Hungarian Football Federation (in Hungarian), Soccerway
Rules for classification: 1) Points; 2) Matches won; 3) Goal difference; 4) Goals scored; 5) Head-to-head points; 6) Head-to-head goal difference; 7) Head-to-head away goals scored; 8) Fairplay; 9) Draw.

==== Results summary ====
Overall								Home						Away					
Pld	W	D	L	GF	GA	GD	Pts	W	D	L	GF	GA	GD	W	D	L	GF	GA	GD
33	11	8	14	42	46	−4	41	6	5	6	22	19	+3	5	3	8	20	27	−7

Source: Hungarian Football Federation

==== Results by round ====
Round	1	2	3	4	5	6	7	8	9	10	11	12	13	14	15	16	17	18	19	20	21	22	23	24	25	26	27	28	29	30	31	32	33
Ground	H	A	H	A	H	H	A	H	A	H	A	A	H	A	H	A	A	H	A	H	A	H	H	A	H	A	H	H	A	H	A	H	A
Result	D	L	W	W	D	L	L	W	L	L	W	D	L	W	D	D	L	L	L	D	L	W	L	W	W	L	D	W	L	W	D	L	W
Position	7	10	5	4	5	6	7	7	7	8	7	7	9	7	7	8	8	8	10	10	11	9	10	9	9	9	9	9	11	8	8	9	8
Points	1	1	4	7	8	8	8	11	11	11	14	15	15	18	19	20	20	20	20	21	21	24	24	27	30	30	31	34	34	37	38	38	41

Source: Matches
A = Away; H = Home; W = Win; D = Draw; L = Loss

==== Matches ====
17 July 2016 1	Debrecen	1–1	Paks	Debrecen
18:00 CEST (UTC+2)	Takács 37', (yellow card) 56'; Holman (yellow card) 53'	Report	Papp (yellow card) 44'; Bartha 59'; Kulcsár (yellow card) 61'; Hahn (yellow card) 89'	Stadium: Nagyerdei Stadion; Attendance: 2,851; Referee: Balázs Berke; Assistant referees: Dr. Zsolt Varga, Tamás Márkus; Fourth official: János Medovarszki; Goal-line assistants: József Erdős, Gábor Oláh

24 July 2016 2	Vasas	3–1	Debrecen	Budapest
18:00 CEST (UTC+2)	Korcsmár (yellow card) 32'; Berecz (yellow card) 52'; Ádám 54'; Vida (yellow card) 57'; Vaskó 85', 88'	Report	Ferenczi 33'; Tisza (yellow card) 64'	Stadium: Illovszky Rudolf Stadion; Attendance: 2,692; Referee: Tamás Bognár; Assistant referees: Georgiou Theodoros, Gergely Becséri; Fourth official: Gábor Takács; Goal-line assistants: Csaba Pintér, Gyöngyi Gaál

31 July 2016 3	Debrecen	4–0	Gyirmót	Debrecen
18:00 CEST (UTC+2)	Z. Horváth 15'; Korhut 20'; Kuti (yellow card) 52'; Tisza 57'; Takács 69'	Report	Paku (yellow card) 13'; Filkor (yellow card) 23'; An. Simon (yellow card) 25'; S. Nagy (yellow card) 88'	Stadium: Nagyerdei Stadion; Attendance: 2,463; Referee: Zoltán Iványi; Assistant referees: Zsolt Szpisják, István Albert; Fourth official: János Medovarszki; Goal-line assistants: Sándor Andó-Szabó, László Lovas

7 August 2016 4	Mezőkövesd	0–1	Debrecen	Mezőkövesd
18:00 CEST (UTC+2)	Egerszegi (yellow card) 37'; Kink (yellow card) 90+1'	Report	Kuti 55'; Tisza (red card) 61'; Horváth (yellow card) 79'; Takács (yellow card) 90'; Jovanović (yellow card) 90+1'; Danilović (yellow card) 90+3'	Stadium: Városi Stadion; Attendance: 3,248; Referee: Gergely Szőts; Assistant referees: Gábor Varga Jr., Balázs Szalai; Fourth official: Dániel Szalai; Goal-line assistants: Tamás Bognár, Gábor Oláh

13 August 2016 5	Debrecen	1–1	MTK	Debrecen
18:00 CEST (UTC+2)	Jovanović (yellow card) 45'; Ferenczi (yellow card) 67'; Castillion 75'	Report	Vogyicska 35'; Korozmán (yellow card) 50'; Borbély (yellow card) 74'; Kanta (yellow card) 75'; Vukmir (yellow card) 76'; Vadnai (yellow card) 82'; Torghelle (yellow card) 90+2'	Stadium: Nagyerdei Stadion; Attendance: 4,091; Referee: Ferenc Karakó; Assistant referees: Gábor Erős, Dániel Szalai; Fourth official: Balázs Szalai; Goal-line assistants: János Takács, Katalin Kulcsár

17 August 2016 6	Debrecen	0–1	Haladás	Debrecen
18:00 CEST (UTC+2)		Report	Németh (yellow card) 58'; Williams 60'; Kovács (yellow card) 72'; Ars (yellow card) 86'	Stadium: Nagyerdei Stadion; Attendance: 2,367; Referee: József Erdős; Assistant referees: Vencel Tóth II, Tamás Márkus; Fourth official: Gergely Becséri; Goal-line assistants: János Takács, Róbert Nagy

21 August 2016 7	Videoton	5–1	Debrecen	Felcsút (Note: The match was played at the Pancho Aréna in Felcsút, instead of Videoton regular stadium, the Sóstói Stadion in Székesfehérvár, built in 1967 which was demolished to make way to the newly built Sóstói Stadion.)
20:00 CEST (UTC+2)	Lang 23', 57'; Géresi 33'; Feczesin 73', 90+2'	Report	Varga (yellow card) 7'; Ferenczi 14'	Stadium: Pancho Aréna; Attendance: 1,423; Referee: Zoltán Iványi; Assistant referees: Balázs Buzás, János Medovarszki; Fourth official: Dániel Szalai; Goal-line assistants: Balázs Berke, Attila Molnár

10 September 2016 8	Debrecen	2–1	Újpest	Debrecen
18:00 CEST (UTC+2)	Holman 10'; Sekulić (yellow card) 75'; Horváth 83'; Ferenczi (yellow card) 86'; Z. Nagy (yellow card) 90+2'	Report	Lázok (yellow card) 44'; Andrić (yellow card) 49'; Sekulić 78' (o.g.); T. Nagy (yellow card) 89'	Stadium: Nagyerdei Stadion; Attendance: 4,081; Referee: Tamás Bognár; Assistant referees: Dr. Zsolt Varga, Georgiou Theodoros; Fourth official: Tamás Márkus; Goal-line assistants: József Erdős, Róbert Nagy

17 September 2016 9	Ferencváros	3–1	Debrecen	Budapest
20:30 CEST (UTC+2)	Böde 14', 65'; Nalepa (yellow card) 59'; Dilaver 62'; Ramírez (yellow card) 75'	Report	Brković (yellow card) 12'; Bobko 16'; Könyves (yellow card) 51'; Tőzsér (yellow card) 68'; Ferenczi (yellow card) 81'; Horváth (yellow card) 82'	Stadium: Groupama Arena; Attendance: 5,198; Referee: Zsolt Szabó; Assistant referees: Oszkár Lémon, Balázs Szert; Fourth official: Attila Kelemen; Goal-line assistants: Gergely Szőts, Szabolcs Szilasi

20 September 2016 10	Debrecen	0–1	Honvéd	Debrecen
20:00 CEST (UTC+2)	Tőzsér (yellow card) 56'	Report	Lanzafame 6'; Zsótér (yellow card) 86'	Stadium: Nagyerdei Stadion; Attendance: 1,685; Referee: István Vad; Assistant referees: Balázs Buzás, Balázs Farkas; Fourth official: János Medovarszki; Goal-line assistants: Zoltán Iványi, Róbert Nagy

24 September 2016 11	Diósgyőr	1–3	Debrecen	Miskolc
18:00 CEST (UTC+2)	Novothny 57', (yellow card) 59'; Daushvili (yellow card) 59'; Tamás (red card) 87'	Report	Holman 27'; Szakály 37'; Könyves (yellow card) 55'; Brković (red card) 59'; Bobko (yellow card) 75'; Tőzsér 87'	Stadium: Diósgyőri Stadion; Attendance: 4,654; Referee: Sándor Andó-Szabó; Assistant referees: Gábor Erős, Balázs; Fourth official: Gergely Becséri; Goal-line assistants: József Erdős, Ádám Németh

15 October 2016 12	Paks	1–1	Debrecen	Paks
18:00 CEST (UTC+2)	Bartha 13'; Papp (yellow card) 72'	Report	Vittek 47', (yellow card) 90+2'	Stadium: Fehérvári úti Stadion; Attendance: 836; Referee: Gergely Szőts; Assistant referees: István Albert, Balázs Buzás; Fourth official: Oszkár Lémon; Goal-line assistants: Zoltán Iványi, Gábor Oláh

22 October 2016 13	Debrecen	1–2	Vasas	Debrecen
17:30 CEST (UTC+2)	Holman 51'; Castillion (yellow card) 71'; Tőzsér (yellow card) 90+6'	Report	Murka 45'; Sağlık 56'; James (yellow card) 90+6'	Stadium: Nagyerdei Stadion; Attendance: 3,723; Referee: József Erdős; Assistant referees: Vencel Tóth II, Balázs Szalai; Fourth official: Gábor Varga Jr. Goal-line assistants: Sándor Andó-Szabó, Ádám Németh

29 October 2016 14	Gyirmót	1–2	Debrecen	Győr
18:00 CEST (UTC+2)	Achim (yellow card) 22'; Madarász 71'; Présinger (red card) 81'	Report	Vittek 9'; Holman 23'; Tőzsér (red card) 42'; Bobko (yellow card) 89'	Stadium: Ménfői úti Stadion; Attendance: 1,013; Referee: István Vad; Assistant referees: István Albert, Arnold Kepe; Fourth official: Gergely Becséri; Goal-line assistants: Csaba Pintér, Gyöngyi Gaál

5 November 2016 15	Debrecen	0–0	Mezőkövesd	Debrecen
15:30 CET (UTC+1)		Report	Gohér (yellow card) 55'	Stadium: Nagyerdei Stadion; Attendance: 2,385; Referee: Zoltán Iványi; Assistant referees: György Ring, Balázs Buzás; Fourth official: Gábor Kormányos II; Goal-line assistants: Ádám Farkas, Gergely Szőts

19 November 2016 16	MTK	1–1	Debrecen	Budapest
15:30 CET (UTC+1)	Borbély (yellow card) 31'; Kanta 58'; Ramos (yellow card) 71'	Report	Tőzsér (yellow card) 23'; Bobko (yellow card) 51'; Danilović (yellow card) 57'; Brković (yellow card) 64'; Holman 90+4'	Stadium: Hidegkuti Nándor Stadion; Attendance: 1,657; Referee: Sándor Andó-Szabó; Assistant referees: Georgiou Theodoros, Balázs Szalai; Fourth official: Tamás Márkus; Goal-line assistants: Zoltán Iványi, Csaba Pintér

26 November 2016 17	Haladás	1–0	Debrecen	Sopron (Note: The match was played at the Káposztás utcai Stadion in Sopron, instead of Haladás regular stadium, the Rohonci út in Szombathely, which was demolished to make way to the newly built Haladás Sportkomplexum.)
15:30 CET (UTC+1)	Iszlai (yellow card) 51'; Ars 53', (yellow card) 59'	Report	Jovanović (yellow card) 25'; Filip (yellow card) 35'	Stadium: Káposztás utcai Stadion; Attendance: 1,147; Referee: Zsolt Szabó; Assistant referees: Oszkár Lémon, Gergely Becséri; Fourth official: Zoltán Horváth; Goal-line assistants: Balázs Berke, Attila Molnár

3 December 2016 18	Debrecen	0–1	Videoton	Debrecen
18:00 CET (UTC+1)	Jovanović (yellow card) 70'; Völgyi (yellow card) 75'	Report	Hadžić 61'	Stadium: Nagyerdei Stadion; Attendance: 1,814; Referee: József Erdős; Assistant referees: Tamás Márkus, Balázs Farkas; Fourth official: János Medovarszki; Goal-line assistants: Ferenc Karakó, Ádám Németh

10 December 2016 19	Újpest	2–0	Debrecen	Kecskemét (Note: The match was played at the Széktói Stadion in Kecskemét, instead of Újpest regular stadium, the Szusza Ferenc Stadion in Budapest, due to the renovation work were still underway.)
15:30 CET (UTC+1)	Diarra (yellow card) 44'; Pávkovics (yellow card) 46'; Andrić 48'; Balázs (yellow card) 56'; Bardhi 78'	Report	Sekulić (yellow card) 68'; Takács (yellow card) 78'; Tőzsér (yellow card) 84'	Stadium: Széktói Stadion; Attendance: 700; Referee: Zoltán Iványi; Assistant referees: János Medovarszki, Gábor Kormányos II; Fourth official: Balázs Buzás; Goal-line assistants: Gergely Szőts, Gyöngyi Gaál

18 February 2017 20	Debrecen	0–0	Ferencváros	Debrecen
18:00 CET (UTC+1)	Osváth (yellow card) 67'	Report	Hüsing (yellow card) 67'; Moutari (yellow card) 69'	Stadium: Nagyerdei Stadion; Attendance: 7,138; Referee: Ádám Farkas; Assistant referees: György Ring, Balázs Szert; Fourth official: Balázs Farkas; Goal-line assistants: Ádám Németh, János Takács

25 February 2017 21	Honvéd	1–0	Debrecen	Budapest
15:30 CET (UTC+1)	Eppel 85'	Report	Brković (yellow card) 90+2'	Stadium: Bozsik József Stadion; Attendance: 2,019; Referee: Balázs Berke; Assistant referees: Dr. Zsolt Varga, Oszkár Lémon; Fourth official: Tamás Márkus; Goal-line assistants: István Vad, Róbert Nagy

4 March 2017 22	Debrecen	3–0	Diósgyőr	Debrecen
15:30 CET (UTC+1)	Feltscher (yellow card) 18', (goal) 60'; Osváth 30'; Ferenczi 33'; Brković (yellow card) 37'	Report	Eperjesi (yellow card) 25'	Stadium: Nagyerdei Stadion; Attendance: 4,214; Referee: Viktor Kassai; Assistant referees: Balázs Huszár, Péter Kóbor; Fourth official: Zoltán Horváth; Goal-line assistants: Tamás Bognár, János Takács

11 March 2017 23	Debrecen	1–3	Paks	Debrecen
15:30 CET (UTC+1)	Suk (yellow card) 38'; Brković (yellow card) 45'; Tőzsér 68'	Report	Papp (yellow card) 21'; Haraszti 61'; Kecskés (yellow card) 68'; Kulcsár 75'; Bartha 84'	Stadium: Nagyerdei Stadion; Attendance: 3,021; Referee: Csaba Pintér; Assistant referees: Oszkár Lémon, Krisztián Király; Fourth official: Tamás Márkus; Goal-line assistants: Róbert Nagy, Attila Molnár

1 April 2017 24	Vasas	2–3	Debrecen	Budapest (Note: The match was played at the Szusza Ferenc Stadion in Budapest, instead of Vasas regular stadium, the Illovszky Rudolf Stadion in Budapest, built in 1960 which was demolished to make way to the newly built Illovszky Rudolf Stadion.)
18:00 CEST (UTC+2)	Ádám 45'; Vaskó 77'	Report	Tőzsér 26'; Burmeister 43' (o.g.); Szatmári (yellow card) 44'; Könyves 88'	Stadium: Szusza Ferenc Stadion; Attendance: 2,459; Referee: Csaba Pintér; Assistant referees: Balázs Buzás, János Medovarszki; Fourth official: Zoltán Horváth; Goal-line assistants: Sándor Andó-Szabó, Gábor Oláh

8 April 2017 25	Debrecen	2–1	Gyirmót	Debrecen
18:00 CEST (UTC+2)	Filip (yellow card) 10'; Brković 61', (red card) 66'; Mészáros 90+1'	Report	An. Simon 8'; Radeljić (yellow card) 33'; Madarász (yellow card) 85'	Stadium: Nagyerdei Stadion; Attendance: 2,237; Referee: Tamás Bognár; Assistant referees: István Albert, Balázs Farkas; Fourth official: János Medovarszki; Goal-line assistants: Ádám Németh, Róbert Nagy

12 April 2017 26	Mezőkövesd	2–1	Debrecen	Mezőkövesd
18:00 CEST (UTC+2)	Veselinović 7'; Szeles (yellow card) 20'; Hudák (yellow card) 67'; Baracskai 79'	Report	Holman (yellow card) 26'; Suk (yellow card) 67'; Tőzsér 83'	Stadium: Városi Stadion; Attendance: 1,390; Referee: István Vad; Assistant referees: György Ring, László Viszokai; Fourth official: Gergely Becséri; Goal-line assistants: József Erdős, Katalin Kulcsár

15 April 2017 27	Debrecen	0–0	MTK	Debrecen
18:30 CEST (UTC+2)	Osváth (yellow card) 61'	Report	Baki (yellow card) 59'; Okuka (yellow card) 90+1'	Stadium: Nagyerdei Stadion; Attendance: 2,363; Referee: József Erdős; Assistant referees: Georgiou Theodoros, Tamás Márkus; Fourth official: Dániel Szalai; Goal-line assistants: Ádám Radványi, Eszter Urbán

22 April 2017 28	Debrecen	4–2	Haladás	Debrecen
18:00 CEST (UTC+2)	Handžić 16'; Szatmári (yellow card) 19'; Holman 26', 34'; Könyves 61'	Report	Williams 24'; Wils (yellow card) 43'; Bošnjak (yellow card) 58'; Tóth 87'	Stadium: Nagyerdei Stadion; Attendance: 2,030; Referee: Balázs Berke; Assistant referees: Balázs Buzás, János Medovarszki; Fourth official: István Albert; Goal-line assistants: Gergely Szőts, Gyöngyi Gaál

29 April 2017 29	Videoton	3–2	Debrecen	Felcsút
20:30 CEST (UTC+2)	Mészáros 9' (o.g.); Šćepović 58'; Hadžić 81'	Report	Tőzsér (yellow card) 33'; Könyves 34'; Brković (yellow card) 70'; Handžić 83'	Stadium: Pancho Aréna; Attendance: 1,847; Referee: Tamás Bognár; Assistant referees: Péter Kóbor, Balázs Szalai; Fourth official: Krisztián Király; Goal-line assistants: József Erdős, Szabolcs Szilasi

6 May 2017 30	Debrecen	1–0	Újpest	Debrecen
18:00 CEST (UTC+2)	Brković (yellow card) 47'; Filip (red card) 67'; Heris 78' (o.g.)	Report	Diarra (yellow card) 90+4'	Stadium: Nagyerdei Stadion; Attendance: 5,112; Referee: Zoltán Iványi; Assistant referees: Vencel Tóth II, István Albert; Fourth official: Dr. Zsolt Varga; Goal-line assistants: Csaba Pintér, Katalin Kulcsár

13 May 2017 31	Ferencváros	0–0	Debrecen	Budapest
18:00 CEST (UTC+2)	Dilaver (yellow card) 90'; Lovrencsics (yellow card) 90+3'	Report	Osváth (yellow card) 65'	Stadium: Groupama Arena; Attendance: 6,596; Referee: Csaba Pintér; Assistant referees: Gábor Varga Jr., Balázs Szert; Fourth official: Dániel Szalai; Goal-line assistants: József Erdős, Péter Zierkelbach

20 May 2017 32	Debrecen	2–5	Honvéd	Debrecen
18:00 CEST (UTC+2)	Danilović (yellow card) 47'; Jovanović 59'; Suk 66', (yellow card) 67'; Ferenczi (yellow card) 68'	Report	Koszta 4', 37', 90+2'; Eppel 25', 82'	Stadium: Nagyerdei Stadion; Attendance: 6,328; Referee: Ádám Farkas; Assistant referees: Georgiou Theodoros, Tamás Márkus; Fourth official: Dr. Zsolt Varga; Goal-line assistants: Tamás Bognár, János Takács

27 May 2017 33	Diósgyőr	1–3	Debrecen	Mezőkövesd (Note: The match was played at the Városi Stadion in Mezőkövesd, instead of Diósgyőr regular stadium, the Diósgyőri Stadion in Miskolc, opened in 1939 which was demolished to make way to the newly built Diósgyőri Stadion.)
19:00 CEST (UTC+2)	Ugrai 90+2'	Report	Jovanović 9'; Szatmári 45+2'; Filip (yellow card) 48'; Mészáros (yellow card) 54'; Holman (yellow card) 72'; Könyves 82'	Stadium: Városi Stadion; Attendance: 4,014; Referee: József Erdős; Assistant referees: István Albert, Gergely Becséri; Fourth official: Péter Kóbor; Goal-line assistants: Gergely Szőts, Péter Zierkelbach

=== Magyar Kupa ===
14 September 2016 Round of 128	Győr	1–0	Debrecen	Győr
18:00 CEST (UTC+2)	Kiliti (yellow card) 17'; Magasföldi 47'; Pongrácz (yellow card) 83'; Horváth (yellow card) 87'	Report		Stadium: ETO Park; Attendance: 1,000; Referee: Dr. Gergely Kovács; Assistant referees: Tamás Kulman, Zsolt Király

=== UEFA Europa League ===
==== Qualifying rounds ====
===== First qualifying round =====
30 June 2016 First leg	La Fiorita (San Marino)	0–5	(Hungary) Debrecen	Serravalle, San Marino
18:30 CEST (UTC+2)	Bugli (yellow card) 55'; G. Bollini (yellow card) 72'; Gasperoni (yellow card) 84'; Martini (yellow card) 85'	Report	Szakály 5', 83'; Tisza 34', 49'; Kulcsár 89'	Stadium: San Marino Stadium; Attendance: 402; Referee: Juri Frischer (Estonia); Assistant referees: Silver Koiv (Estonia), Dmitri Vinogradov (Estonia); Fourth official: Eiko Saar (Estonia)

7 July 2016 Second leg	Debrecen (Hungary)	2–0 (7–0 agg.)	(San Marino) La Fiorita	Debrecen, Hungary
18:00 CEST (UTC+2)	Tisza 41', (yellow card) 69'; Holman 51'	Report	Cangini (yellow card) 13'; G. Bollini (yellow card) 75'; Cavalli (yellow card) 79'; Zafferani (yellow card) 88'	Stadium: Nagyerdei Stadion; Attendance: 8,632; Referee: Stavros Mantalos (Greece); Assistant referees: Michael Karsiotis (Greece), Stylianos Tsolakis (Greece); Fourth official: Marios Lambropoulos (Greece)
Note: Debrecen won 7–0 on aggregate.

===== Second qualifying round =====
14 July 2016 First leg	Debrecen (Hungary)	1–2	(Belarus) Torpedo-BelAZ Zhodino	Debrecen, Hungary
18:30 CEST (UTC+2)	Tisza 2'; Brković (yellow card) 50'; K. Mészáros (yellow card) 52'; J. Varga (yellow card) 88'	Report	Zahynaylov 23'; Pankavets (yellow card) 25'; Shapoval (yellow card) 31'; Shcherba (yellow card) 68'; Klopotskiy 88'; Pavlyukovets (yellow card) 90+1'	Stadium: Nagyerdei Stadion; Attendance: 6,015; Referee: Leontios Trattou (Cyprus); Assistant referees: Michael Soteriou (Cyprus), Sotiris Viktoros (Cyprus); Fourth official: Nikolas Neokleous (Cyprus)

21 July 2016 Second leg	Torpedo-BelAZ Zhodino (Belarus)	1–0 (3–1 agg.)	(Hungary) Debrecen	Zhodzina, Belarus
19:00 MSK (UTC+3)	Dzemidovich 25'; Zahynaylov (yellow card) 35'; Shapoval (yellow card) 44'; Khachaturyan (yellow card) 72'; Chelyadko (yellow card) 90+4'	Report	Brković (yellow card) 63'	Stadium: Torpedo Stadium; Attendance: 2,650; Referee: Dimitar Meckarovski (Macedonia); Assistant referees: Dejan Nedelkoski (Macedonia), Goce Petreski (Macedonia); Fourth official: Dejan Jakimovksi (Macedonia)
Note: Torpedo-BelAZ Zhodino won 3–1 on aggregate.

== Statistics ==
=== Overall ===
Appearances (Apps) numbers are for appearances in competitive games only, including sub appearances.
Source: Competitions

No.	Player	Pos.	Nemzeti Bajnokság I				Magyar Kupa				UEFA Europa League				Total			
No.	Player	Pos.	Apps	Goal	Booked	Sent off (straight red)	Apps	Goal	Booked	Sent off (straight red)	Apps	Goal	Booked	Sent off (straight red)	Apps	Goal	Booked	Sent off (straight red)
1	(Croatia) Ivan Kelava	GK																
2	(Hungary) Attila Osváth	DF	14	1	3										14	1	3	
3	(Hungary) Csaba Szatmári	DF	13	1	2						1				14	1	2	
4	(Romania) Ioan Filip	MF	25		3	1									25		3	1
5	(Hungary) Péter Szilvási	DF	1				1								2			
8	(Hungary) Dániel Tőzsér	MF	24	4	6	1	1								25	4	6	1
10	(Hungary) Dávid Holman	MF	26	7	3		1				4	1			31	8	3	
10	(Hungary) Tibor Tisza	FW	6	1	1	1					4	4	1		10	5	2	1
11	(Hungary) János Ferenczi	MF	24	3	4		1				3				28	3	4	
14	(Hungary) Krisztián Kuti	DF	5	1	1										5	1	1	
15	(Hungary) Tamás Kertész	FW																
15	(Hungary) Dániel Völgyi	DF	7		1		1								8		1	
16	(Bosnia and Herzegovina) Ognjen Đelmić	MF	9				1				3				13			
17	(Hungary) Norbert Mészáros	DF	25	1	1						3				28	1	1	
18	(Nigeria) Derick Ogbu	FW	5												5			
19	(Cameroon) Justin Mengolo	MF	5												5			
20	(Hungary) Tamás Takács	FW	11	2	3		1				1				13	2	3	
21	(Hungary) Bence Ludánszki	MF	2												2			
22	(Venezuela) Frank Feltscher	MF	12	1	1										12	1	1	
22	(Croatia) Božidar Radošević	GK									4				4			
23	(Hungary) Dániel Bereczki	FW	4												4			
24	(Serbia) Danilo Sekulić	MF	19		2						3				22		2	
25	(Serbia) Dušan Brković	DF	30	1	7	2	1				4		2		35	1	9	2
27	(Slovakia) Karol Mészáros	MF	9								3		1		12		1	
28	(Hungary) Zoltán Nagy	DF	6		1		1								7		1	
30	(Hungary) János Balogh	GK																
33	(Hungary) József Varga	MF	4		1						4		1		8		2	
33	(Slovakia) Róbert Vittek	FW	8	2	1										8	2	1	
37	(Hungary) Szabolcs Barna	DF	1												1			
37	(Hungary) Ákos Kinyik	DF																
42	(Serbia) Norbert Könyves	FW	17	4	2		1								18	4	2	
44	(Serbia) Branislav Danilović	GK	29		3		1								30		3	
55	(Hungary) Péter Szakály	MF	12	1			1				4	2			17	3		
66	(Hungary) Nándor Kóródi	FW	1												1			
69	(Hungary) Mihály Korhut	DF	6	1							3				9	1		
70	(Ukraine) Ivan Bobko	MF	10	1	3		1								11	1	3	
70	(Hungary) Tamás Kulcsár	FW	6								1	1			7	1		
70	(Hungary) Kevin Nagy	MF	1												1			
77	(Serbia) Aleksandar Jovanović	DF	30	2	4						4				34	2	4	
87	(Hungary) István Verpecz	GK	5												5			
88	(Hungary) Zsolt Horváth	MF	18	2	2		1								19	2	2	
90	(Bosnia and Herzegovina) Haris Handžić	FW	12	2											12	2		
91	(Netherlands) Geoffrey Castillion	FW	7	1	1						4				11	1	1	
91	(South Korea) Suk Hyun-jun	FW	13	1	3										13	1	3	
Own goals				2												2		
Totals				42	59	5						8	5			50	64	5

=== Clean sheets ===
			Clean sheets			
No.	Player	Games Played	Nemzeti Bajnokság I	Magyar Kupa	UEFA Europa League	Total
44	(Serbia) Branislav Danilović	30	8			8
22	(Croatia) Božidar Radošević	4			2	2
87	(Hungary) István Verpecz	5				
1	(Croatia) Ivan Kelava					
30	(Hungary) János Balogh					
Totals			8		2	10
