= 2020 Belarusian Premier League =

Belarusian Premier League
- Season: 2020
- Dates: 19 March – 28 November 2020
- Champions: Shakhtyor Soligorsk
- Relegated: Gorodeya; Belshina Bobruisk; Smolevichi
- Champions League: Shakhtyor Soligorsk
- Conference League: BATE Borisov; Torpedo-BelAZ Zhodino
- Matches: 239
- Goals: 704 (2.95 per match)
- Top goalscorer: Maksim Skavysh (BATE) (19 goals)
- Biggest home win: BATE 6–0 Minsk (26 July 2020)
- Biggest away win: Energetik-BGU 1–8 Rukh (12 July 2020)
- Highest scoring: Belshina 3–7 Rukh (28 November 2020)
- Longest winning run: 7 matches Neman
- Longest unbeaten run: 16 matches Shakhtyor
- Longest winless run: 13 matches Smolevichi
- Longest losing run: 13 matches Smolevichi
- All statistics correct as of 28 November 2020.

The 2020 Belarusian Premier League was the 30th season of top-tier football in Belarus. Dynamo Brest were the defending champions, having won their first league title last year. Shakhtyor Soligorsk became champions on the last play date by beating FC Minsk 4–2. Meanwhile, BATE Borisov didn't win and drew 0–0 at Dinamo Minsk so Shaktyor Soligorsk finished 1 point above BATE in the table and will play in the 2021–22 UEFA Champions League.

By late March 2020, it was the only European top-flight league being contested, as all others were suspended due to the COVID-19 pandemic; games were played with crowds. As a result, this led to substantially increased viewership from all over the world, due to sporting inactivity elsewhere. Only a few matches were postponed due to outbreaks of the disease in some teams and only one was cancelled due to the lack of influence of the result in November 2020. Matches were also postponed in August by the decision of the Football Federation of Belarus on the eve of the presidential elections and during protests in the country due to "force majeure circumstances".

== Teams ==
Locations of the 2020 Belarusian Premier League teams

The 15th-placed team of the last season Gomel was relegated to the 2020 Belarusian First League. Torpedo Minsk were excluded from the league halfway through the last season and will not play in any league in 2020. Gomel and Torpedo were replaced by two best teams of 2019 Belarusian First League (Belshina Bobruisk and Smolevichi).

14-placed team of the last season (Dnyapro Mogilev) were relegated after they lost relegation/promotion playoffs against First League third-placed team Rukh Brest (who were promoted to replace Dnyapro).

Team	Location	Venue	Capacity	Position in 2019
BATE	Borisov	Borisov Arena	13,121	2nd
Belshina	Bobruisk	Spartak Stadium	3,700	1st (First League)
Dinamo Brest	Brest	OSK Brestsky	10,060	1st
Dinamo Minsk	Minsk	Dinamo Stadium	22,324	4th
Energetik-BGU	Minsk	City Stadium (Molodechno)	4,800	12th
Gorodeya	Gorodeya	Gorodeya Stadium	1,625	7th
Isloch	Minsk Raion	Traktor Stadium	17,600	5th
Minsk	Minsk	Traktor Stadium	17,600	10th
Neman	Grodno	Neman Stadium	8,479	9th
Rukh	Brest	OSK Brestsky	10,060	3rd (First League)
Shakhtyor	Soligorsk	Stroitel Stadium	4,200	3rd
Slavia	Mozyr	Yunost Stadium	5,133	8th
Slutsk	Slutsk	City Stadium (Slutsk)	1,896	11th
Smolevichi	Smolevichi	Ozyorny Stadium	1,600	2nd (First League)
Torpedo-BelAZ	Zhodino	Torpedo Stadium	6,524	6th
Vitebsk	Vitebsk	Vitebsky CSK	8,144	13th

1. One game played at City Stadium in Borisov.
2. Two games played at Aleksandr Prokopenko Stadium.
3. One game played at Traktor Stadium.
4. Energetik-BGU spent the season at City Stadium in Molodechno due to league's requirement to play on natural grass pitch in the summer. In addition, three games played at RCOP-BGU Stadium in Minsk.
5. Four games played at FC Minsk Stadium and one game at Dinamo Stadium.
6. Two games played at FC Minsk Stadium.
7. Six games played at City Stadium in Borisov.

=== Personnel ===
Team	Manager	Captain	Kit manufacturer	Shirt Sponsor (Chest)
BATE Borisov	(Belarus) Aleksandr Lisovskiy	(Belarus) Ihar Stasevich	Adidas	Minsk Tractor Works
Belshina Bobruisk	(Belarus) Dmitriy Migas (caretaker)	(Belarus) Sergey Turanok	Joma	Belshina
Dynamo Brest	(Belarus) Syarhey Kavalchuk	(Belarus) Aleh Veratsila	Joma	Belavia
Dinamo Minsk	(Belarus) Leonid Kuchuk	(Belarus) Edhar Alyakhnovich	Saller	None
Energetik-BGU	(Belarus) Vladimir Belyavskiy	(Belarus) Aleksey Nosko	Nike	Belenergo
Gorodeya	(Belarus) Oleg Radushko	(Belarus) Igor Dovgyallo	Macron	Gorodeya Sugar Refinery
Isloch Minsk Raion	(Belarus) Vitaly Zhukovsky	(Belarus) Dzmitry Kamarowski	Joma	Hyundai
Minsk	(Belarus) Vadim Skripchenko	(Belarus) Syarhey Vyeramko	Macron	TASK Insurance
Neman Grodno	(Belarus) Igor Kovalevich	(Belarus) Valery Zhukowski	Saller	None
Rukh Brest	(Belarus) Aleksandr Sednyov	(Belarus) Artsyom Rakhmanaw	Erreà	Belgosstrakh
Shakhtyor Soligorsk	(Ukraine) Roman Hryhorchuk	(Belarus) Alyaksandr Hutar	Jako	Belaruskali
Slavia Mozyr	(Belarus) Mihail Martsinovich	(Belarus) Mikhail Baranovsky	Joma	Mozyr Oil Refinery
Slutsk	(Belarus) Aleksandr Konchits (caretaker)	(Belarus) Barys Pankrataw	Hummel	None
Smolevichi	(Belarus) Alexei Mikhailov (caretaker)	(Belarus) Eduard Zhevnerov	Joma	None
Torpedo-BelAZ Zhodino	(Belarus) Yuri Puntus	(Belarus) Andrey Khachaturyan	Adidas	BelAZ
Vitebsk	(Belarus) Sergey Yasinsky	(Belarus) Artsyom Skitaw	Nike	Parimatch

=== Managerial changes ===
Team	Outgoing manager	Manner of departure	Date of vacancy	Position in table	Incoming manager	Date of appointment
Dinamo Minsk	(Belarus) Sergei Gurenko	Mutual consent	20 April 2020	12th	(Belarus) Leonid Kuchuk	22 April 2020
Slutsk	(Ukraine) Vitaliy Pavlov	Resigned	26 June 2020	11th	(Belarus) Aleksandr Konchits (caretaker)	26 June 2020
Belshina	(Belarus) Eduard Gradoboyev	Sacked	1 July 2020	16th	(Belarus) Dmitriy Migas (caretaker)	1 July 2020
Smolevichi	(Belarus) Aleksandr Brazevich	Resigned	6 July 2020	15th	(Belarus) Alexei Mikhailov (caretaker)	6 July 2020
Minsk	(Belarus) Andrey Razin	Resigned	4 August 2020	14th	(Belarus) Vadim Skripchenko	4 August 2020
Shakhtyor Soligorsk	(Ukraine) Yuriy Vernydub	Resigned	31 August 2020	1st	(Ukraine) Roman Hryhorchuk	5 September 2020

== League table ==
Pos	Team	Pld	W	D	L	GF	GA	GD	Pts	Qualification or relegation
1	Shakhtyor Soligorsk (C)	30	17	8	5	57	21	+36	59	Qualification for the Champions League first qualifying round
2	BATE Borisov	30	17	7	6	65	32	+33	58	Qualification for the Europa Conference League second qualifying round
3	Torpedo-BelAZ Zhodino	30	16	8	6	55	37	+18	56	Qualification for the Europa Conference League second qualifying round
4	Dynamo Brest	30	17	3	10	63	40	+23	54	Qualification for the Europa Conference League second qualifying round
5	Neman Grodno	30	16	5	9	41	29	+12	53	
6	Dinamo Minsk	30	16	4	10	38	25	+13	52	
7	Isloch Minsk Raion	30	13	6	11	47	46	+1	45	
8	Rukh Brest	30	11	11	8	57	38	+19	44	
9	Slavia Mozyr	30	10	9	11	41	49	−8	39	
10	Energetik-BGU Minsk	30	11	5	14	43	46	−3	38 (Note: Head-to-head goals scored: Energetik-BGU Minsk 3, Minsk 2)	
11	Minsk	30	11	5	14	45	57	−12	38	
12	Vitebsk	30	8	12	10	30	38	−8	36	
13	Gorodeya (Note: Gorodeya withdrew from the league after the end of the season.) (R)	30	8	7	15	30	48	−18	31	Withdrew from the league
14	Slutsk (O)	29	8	3	18	31	55	−24	27	Qualification to relegation play-offs
15	Belshina Bobruisk (R)	30	5	6	19	34	71	−37	21	Relegation to the Belarusian First League
16	Smolevichi (R)	29	3	5	21	27	72	−45	14	Relegation to the Belarusian First League

Source: football.by
Rules for classification: 1) Points; 2) Head-to-head points; 3) Head-to-head goal difference; 4) Head-to-head goals scored; 5) Goal difference; 6) Matches won; 7) Goals scored.
(C) Champions; (O) Play-off winners; (R) Relegated

== Results ==
Each team plays home-and-away once against every other team for a total of 30 matches played each.

Home \ Away	BAT	BSH	DBR	DMI	ENE	GRD	ISL	FCM	NEM	RUH	SHA	SLA	SLU	SML	TZH	VIT
BATE Borisov	—	5–0	2–4	0–2	0–1	1–0	1–0	6–0	3–1	1–0	2–2	1–1	3–0	5–2	0–0	3–1
Belshina Bobruisk	0–2	—	0–3	0–4	1–5	0–1	2–3	1–3	0–1	3–7	1–5	2–3	4–2	1–1	2–1	1–1
Dynamo Brest	1–3	1–2	—	2–1	2–1	3–1	3–1	6–1	3–1	5–2	0–2	1–2	3–1	1–1	2–3	1–0
Dinamo Minsk	0–0	3–1	2–4	—	0–0	1–0	1–0	1–0	2–0	0–1	0–1	1–0	1–2	2–1	2–0	1–0
Energetik-BGU Minsk	3–1	0–1	2–1	2–3	—	0–1	1–1	2–0	1–1	1–8	1–2	5–0	0–2	4–1	1–4	3–3
Gorodeya	0–2	2–1	1–4	1–0	1–1	—	0–2	1–1	0–2	1–3	0–2	1–1	3–0	4–0	1–3	2–2
Isloch Minsk Raion	2–2	2–1	2–0	2–1	1–2	2–2	—	3–4	1–0	1–1	4–2	2–1	2–3	1–0	2–2	2–0
Minsk	0–3	2–2	1–2	3–2	2–1	3–0	0–1	—	4–3	0–1	1–1	2–1	1–0	2–1	2–5	2–2
Neman Grodno	0–2	1–1	1–0	1–0	3–0	0–1	1–0	2–0	—	2–4	0–0	1–2	1–0	2–0	3–1	2–0
Rukh Brest	0–3	3–0	1–4	1–0	0–1	1–1	1–1	1–0	2–3	—	1–2	3–3	5–0	0–0	3–3	0–1
Shakhtyor Soligorsk	1–1	4–0	1–0	0–1	1–0	4–1	4–0	4–2	0–0	1–1	—	2–0	1–2	4–0	0–1	5–0
Slavia Mozyr	2–1	1–1	1–1	0–1	2–1	1–1	2–4	1–3	1–3	0–0	1–0	—	3–1	2–1	0–0	1–1
Slutsk	1–3	3–2	0–1	1–2	1–2	0–1	2–1	2–1	0–1	1–1	0–2	3–1	—	–	1–1	1–1
Smolevichi	3–5	0–3	3–3	1–3	0–2	4–1	3–1	0–4	1–4	0–6	0–0	0–3	2–1	—	1–4	0–1
Torpedo-BelAZ Zhodino	3–2	1–0	0–2	0–0	2–0	3–1	2–0	1–1	0–1	0–0	1–4	4–2	4–1	2–1	—	1–0
Vitebsk	2–2	1–1	1–0	1–1	1–0	1–0	2–3	1–0	0–0	0–0	0–0	2–3	2–0	1–0	2–3	—

Source: Football Federation of Belarus (in Russian)
Legend: Blue = home team win; Yellow = draw; Red = away team win.

== Relegation play-offs ==
The 14th-place finisher of this season (Slutsk) were played a two-legged relegation play-off against the third-placed team of the 2020 Belarusian First League (Krumkachy Minsk) for a spot in the 2021 Premier League.

Leg 1

15 December 2020
16:00 GMT+3

Krumkachy Minsk	0–2	Slutsk
	Report	Bobko 45'; Sirima 79' (pen.)

Football Manege, Minsk
Attendance: 0
Referee: Andrey Vasilevich (Mozyr)

Leg 2

19 December 2020
13:30 GMT+3

Slutsk	2–1	Krumkachy Minsk
Mohammed 5'; Sirima 34' (pen.)	Report	Yatskevich 90+2'

Football Manege, Minsk
Attendance: 0
Referee: Sergey Stetsurin (Brest)

== Season statistics ==
=== Top goalscorers ===
Updated to games played on 1 November 2020
Source: football.by

Rank	Goalscorer	Team	Goals
1.	(Belarus) Maksim Skavysh	BATE Borisov	17
2.	(Uzbekistan) Jasurbek Yakhshiboev	Energetik-BGU/Shakhytor	16
3.	(Belarus) Pavel Nyakhaychyk	BATE Borisov	10
3.	(Brazil) Gabriel Ramos	Torpedo-BelAZ Zhodino	10
3.	(Belarus) Yevgeniy Shikavka	Dinamo Minsk	10
3.	(Serbia) Zoran Marušić	Neman Grodno	10
3.	(Belarus) Pavel Savitski	Dinamo Brest	10
8.	(Armenia) Gegham Kadymyan	Neman Grodno	9
8.	(Belarus) Leonid Kovel	Belshina Bobruisk	9
8.	(Belarus) Dzyanis Laptsew	Dynamo Brest	9
8.	(Belarus) Vitaly Lisakovich	Shakhytor Soligorsk	9
8.	(Moldova) Ion Nicolaescu	Vitebsk	9
8.	(Belarus) Mikalay Yanush	Isloch Minsk Raion	9

=== Hat-tricks ===
Player	For	Against	Result	Date
(Belarus) Valery Gorbachik	Torpedo-BelAZ Zhodino	FC Minsk	5–2 (A)	2 May 2020
(Serbia) Zoran Marušić	Neman Grodno	Slavia Mozyr	3–1 (A)	6 June 2020
(Belarus) Artem Kontsevoy	Rukh Brest	Energetyk-BGU	8–1 (A)	12 July 2020
(Senegal) Abdoulaye Diallo	Dynamo Brest	Dinamo Minsk	4–2 (A)	12 September 2020
(Uzbekistan) Jasurbek Yakhshiboev	Shakhtyor Soligorsk	Belshina Bobruisk	5–1 (A)	31 October 2020

=== Disciplinary ===
Most yellow cards: (10)

- (Belarus) Syarhey Kislyak (Dynamo Brest)

Most red cards: (2)

- (France) Hayk Mosakhanian (Energetik-BGU)
- (Cameroon) Gaby Kiki (Dynamo Brest)
- (Russia) Marat Burayev (Slutsk)
- (Belarus) Aleksandr Svirepa (Energetik-BGU)
- (Belarus) Yevgeniy Yudchits (Energetik-BGU)
- (Belarus) Yury Kazlow (Slutsk)

== Awards ==
=== Weekly awards ===
==== Player of the Week ====
Player of The Week
Week	Player	Club	Reference
1	(Uzbekistan) Jasurbek Yakhshiboev	Energetik-BGU	
2	(Russia) Nikita Melnikov	Slavia Mozyr	
3	(Belarus) Mikhail Baranovsky	Slavia Mozyr	
4	(Brazil) Gabriel Ramos	Torpedo-BelAZ Zhodino	
5	(Belarus) Barys Pankrataw	Slutsk	
6	(Belarus) Ivan Bakhar	Dinamo Minsk	
7	(Belarus) Valery Gorbachik	Torpedo-BelAZ Zhodino	
8	(Belarus) Ihar Stasevich	BATE Borisov	
9	(Brazil) Lipe Veloso	Torpedo-BelAZ Zhodino	
10	(Belarus) Dzmitry Padstrelaw	Shakhtyor Soligorsk	
11	(Belarus) Pavel Savitski	Dynamo Brest	
12	(Serbia) Zoran Marušić	Neman Grodno	
13	(Belarus) Kiril Pavlyuchek	Gorodeya	
14	(Belarus) Ihar Kuzmyanok	Isloch	
15	(Uzbekistan) Jasurbek Yakhshiboev	Energetik-BGU	
16	(Belarus) Vitaly Lisakovich	Shakhtyor Soligorsk	
17	(Belarus) Vladislav Lozhkin	Smolevichi	
18	(Belarus) Pavel Nyakhaychyk	BATE Borisov	
19	(Belarus) Ihar Stasevich	BATE Borisov	
20	(Belarus) Mikalay Yanush	Isloch	
21	(Belarus) Dzmitry Rekish	Belshina	
22	(Belarus) Mikalay Yanush	Isloch	

==== Goal of the Week ====
Goal of The Week
Week	Player	Club	Reference
1	(Guinea) Momo Yansane	Isloch Minsk Raion	
2	(Armenia) Gegham Kadymyan	Neman Grodno	
3	(Belarus) Yevgeniy Klopotskiy	Vitebsk	
4	(Armenia) Gegham Kadymyan	Neman Grodno	
5	(Belarus) Pavel Sedko	Rukh Brest	
6	(Belarus) Vladislav Zhuk	Slavia Mozyr	
7	(Belarus) Vitaly Lisakovich	Shakhtyor Soligorsk	
8	(Armenia) Gegham Kadymyan	Neman Grodno	
9	(Belarus) Vitaly Lisakovich	Shakhtyor Soligorsk	
10	(Belarus) Dzmitry Padstrelaw	Shakhtyor Soligorsk	
11	(Belarus) Anatol Makaraw	Smolevichi	
12	(Belarus) Aleksandr Ksenofontov	Vitebsk	
13	(Belarus) Yevgeniy Shikavka	Dinamo Minsk	
14	(Ghana) Dennis Tetteh	Slavia Mozyr	
15	(Belarus) Aleksandr Dzhigero	Smolevichi	
16	(Belarus) Vitaly Lisakovich	Shakhtyor Soligorsk	
17	(Belarus) Vladislav Lozhkin	Smolevichi	
18	(Serbia) Lazar Sajčić	Gorodeya	
19	(Serbia) Nikola Antić	Shakhtyor Soligorsk	
20	(Ghana) Dennis Tetteh	Slavia Mozyr	
21	(Belarus) Dzmitry Padstrelaw	Shakhtyor Soligorsk	
22	(Belarus) Pavel Nyakhaychyk	BATE Borisov	

=== Monthly awards ===
==== Manager of the Month ====
Month	Manager	Club	Reference
April	(Belarus) Vitaliy Pavlov	Slutsk	
May	(Belarus) Kirill Alshevsky	BATE Borisov	
June	(Belarus) Igor Kovalevich	Neman Grodno	
July	(Ukraine) Yuriy Vernidub	Shakhtyor Soligorsk	
August	(Belarus) Vitaly Zhukovsky	Isloch Minsk Raion	
September	(Belarus) Igor Kovalevich	Neman Grodno	

==== Goal of the Month ====
Month	Player	Club	Reference
April	(Belarus) Vladislav Zhuk	Slavia Mozyr	
May	(Armenia) Gegham Kadymyan	Neman Grodno	
June	(Belarus) Aleksandr Dzhigero	Smolevichi	
July	(Belarus) Vitaly Lisakovich	Shakhtyor Soligorsk	
August	(Belarus) Dzmitry Padstrelaw	Shakhtyor Soligorsk	
September	(Brazil) Lipe Veloso	Torpedo-BelAZ Zhodino	

==== Player of the Month ====
Month	Player	Club	Reference
April	(Brazil) Gabriel Ramos	Torpedo-BelAZ Zhodino	
May	(Belarus) Vitaly Lisakovich	Shakhtyor Soligorsk	
June	(Belarus) Dzyanis Laptsew	Dynamo Brest	
July	(Serbia) Nikola Antić	Shakhtyor Soligorsk	
August	(Belarus) Mikalay Yanush	Isloch Minsk Raion	
September	(Serbia) Zoran Marušić	Neman Grodno	
