= 2017 Belarusian Super Cup =

Torpedo-BelAZ Zhodino	BATE Borisov
1	3
- Date: 11 March 2017
- Venue: FC Minsk Stadium, Minsk
- Referee: Aleksei Kulbakov
- Attendance: 2,550

The 2017 Belarusian Super Cup was held on 11 March 2017 between the 2016 Belarusian Premier League champions BATE Borisov and the 2015–16 Belarusian Cup winners Torpedo-BelAZ Zhodino. BATE won the match 3–1 and won the trophy for the seventh time. This was the fifth time in a row that BATE won the trophy.

== Match details ==
11 March 2017
15:00 UTC+3

Torpedo-BelAZ Zhodino	1–3	BATE Borisov
Khachaturyan 6' (pen.)	Report	Gordeichuk 20', 63'; Ivanić 51'

FC Minsk Stadium, Minsk
Attendance: 2,550
Referee: Aleksei Kulbakov (Gomel)

TORPEDO-BELAZ:
GK	23	(Belarus) Valery Fomichev
RB	5	(Armenia) Kamo Hovhannisyan	(substituted off) 74'
CB	44	(Ukraine) Maksym Imerekov
CB	4	(Belarus) Yevgeniy Klopotskiy
CB	6	(Belarus) Alyaksey Pankavets (c)
LB	3	(North Macedonia) Xhelil Asani	(substituted off) 61'
CM	7	(Ukraine) Serhiy Shapoval
RM	77	(Belarus) Mikhail Afanasyev	(substituted off) 65'
LM	10	(Belarus) Andrey Khachaturyan
FW	13	(Belarus) Maksim Skavysh	(substituted off) 90'
FW	17	(Belarus) Yahor Zubovich	(substituted off) 79'
Substitutes:
GK	33	(Belarus) Yahor Hatkevich
FW	8	(Belarus) Alyaksandr Makas	(substituted on) 74'
MF	9	(Russia) Soslan Gatagov
MF	14	(Belarus) Andrey Solovey	(substituted on) 90'
MF	15	(Belarus) Dzmitry Rekish	(substituted on) 79'
DF	18	(Belarus) Uladzimir Shcherba	(substituted on) 65'
MF	19	(Belarus) Ilya Dzhugir
DF	22	(Belarus) Aleksandr Pavlovets	(substituted on) 61'
Manager:
(Belarus) Igor Kriushenko

BATE:
GK	16	(Belarus) Syarhey Vyeramko
RB	42	(Belarus) Maksim Volodko
CB	19	(Serbia) Nemanja Milunović
CB	33	(Belarus) Dzyanis Palyakow
CB	15	(Belarus) Maksim Zhavnerchik
LB	17	(Belarus) Alyaksey Ryas	(substituted off) 90'
CM	77	(Belarus) Yury Kendysh	(substituted off) 86'
RM	10	(Serbia) Mirko Ivanić	(substituted off) 68'
LM	22	(Belarus) Ihar Stasevich	(substituted off) 72'
FW	62	(Belarus) Mikhail Gordeichuk	(substituted off) 81'
FW	20	(Belarus) Vitali Rodionov (c)	(substituted off) 74'
Substitutes:
GK	35	(Belarus) Anton Chichkan
GK	48	(Belarus) Denis Scherbitskiy
MF	5	(Belarus) Yevgeniy Yablonskiy	(substituted on) 86'
MF	7	(Belarus) Yevgeniy Berezkin	(substituted on) 68'
MF	8	(Belarus) Alyaksandr Valadzko	(substituted on) 72'
FW	9	(Serbia) Anes Rušević	(substituted on) 74'
FW	11	(Belarus) Dmitry Antilevsky
MF	18	(Belarus) Vladislav Zhuk	(substituted on) 90'
DF	23	(Serbia) Miloš Ostojić
DF	44	(Belarus) Vladislav Malkevich
MF	49	(Belarus) Aleksandr Dzhigero
MF	80	(Georgia (country)) Valerian Gvilia	(substituted on) 81'
Manager:
(Belarus) Alyaksandr Yermakovich

== See also ==
- 2016 Belarusian Premier League
- 2015–16 Belarusian Cup
