= Muhammadjon Loiqov =

Tajikistani footballer

Mukhammadjon Nurulloevich Loiqov
Personal information
- Date of birth: 14 April 1998 (age 28)
- Place of birth: Dushanbe, Tajikistan
- Height: 1.75 m (5 ft 9 in)
- Position: Forward

Youth career
- 2014–2018: Dinamo Minsk

Senior career*
Years	Team	Apps	(Gls)
2017–2019	Dinamo Minsk	0	(0)
2018	→ UAS Zhitkovichi (loan)	15	(2)
2019	→ Belshina Bobruisk (loan)	15	(4)
2020	Energetik-BGU Minsk	0	(0)
2020–2021	Lida	44	(9)
2022	Molodechno	11	(2)

International career^{‡}
2018	Tajikistan	2	(0)
- * Club domestic league appearances and goals as of 31 December 2022 ‡ National team caps and goals as of 31 December 2018

Mukhammadjon Nurulloevich Loiqov (born 14 April 1998) is a Tajikistani professional football player.

== Career ==
=== Club ===
Prior to the 2020 Belarusian Premier League season, Loiqov signed for Energetik-BGU Minsk.

=== International ===
Loiqov made his senior team debut on 16 December 2018 against Oman.

== Career statistics ==
=== Club ===
As of match played 16 November 2019

Appearances and goals by club, season and competition
Club	Season	League			National Cup		Continental		Other		Total	
Club	Season	Division	Apps	Goals	Apps	Goals	Apps	Goals	Apps	Goals	Apps	Goals
Dinamo Minsk	2017	Belarusian Premier League	0	0	1	0	0	0	–		1	0
Dinamo Minsk	2018	Belarusian Premier League	0	0	0	0	0	0	–		0	0
Dinamo Minsk	2019	Belarusian Premier League	0	0	0	0	0	0	–		0	0
Dinamo Minsk	Career total		0	0	1	0	0	0	-	-	1	0
UAS Zhitkovichi (loan)	2018	Belarusian First League	15	2	1	0	–		–		16	2
Belshina Bobruisk (loan)	2019	Belarusian First League	15	4	3	0	–		–		18	4
Energetik-BGU Minsk	2020	Belarusian First League	0	0	0	0	–		–		0	0
Career total			30	6	5	0	0	0	-	-	35	6

=== International ===
Tajikistan national team
Year	Apps	Goals
2018	1	0
Total	1	0

Statistics accurate as of match played 16 December 2018
