= Vladislav Malkevich (footballer) =

Belarusian footballer (born 1999)

Personal information
- Date of birth: 4 December 1999 (age 26)
- Place of birth: Molodechno, Minsk Oblast, Belarus
- Height: 1.82 m (5 ft 11 1/2 in)
- Position: Left-back

Team information
- Current team: Ural Yekaterinburg
- Number: 44

Youth career
- 2015–2019: BATE Borisov

Senior career*
Years	Team	Apps	(Gls)
2016–2023	BATE Borisov	49	(5)
2020	→ Slavia Mozyr (loan)	17	(2)
2021	→ Slavia Mozyr (loan)	14	(2)
2023–	Ural Yekaterinburg	48	(0)

International career^{‡}
2015	Belarus U17	3	(1)
2016–2017	Belarus U19	6	(0)
2019–2020	Belarus U21	3	(0)
2022–	Belarus	20	(2)
- * Club domestic league appearances and goals as of 16 May 2026 ‡ National team caps and goals as of 5 June 2026

Vladislav Malkevich (Belarusian: Уладзіслаў Малькевіч; Russian: Владислав Малькевич; born 4 December 1999) is a Belarusian professional footballer who plays for Russian club Ural Yekaterinburg and for the Belarus national team.

== Club career ==
On 8 September 2023, Malkevich signed with Russian Premier League club Ural Yekaterinburg.

== Career statistics ==
=== Club ===
As of match played 23 May 2026

Appearances and goals by club, season and competition
Club	Season	League			Cup		Continental		Other		Total	
Club	Season	Division	Apps	Goals	Apps	Goals	Apps	Goals	Apps	Goals	Apps	Goals
BATE Borisov	2016	Belarusian Premier League	1	0	1	0	0	0	0	0	2	0
BATE Borisov	2017	Belarusian Premier League	0	0	1	0	0	0	0	0	1	0
BATE Borisov	2018	Belarusian Premier League	2	0	0	0	0	0	0	0	2	0
BATE Borisov	2021	Belarusian Premier League	4	0	3	0	0	0	0	0	7	0
BATE Borisov	2022	Belarusian Premier League	27	4	6	0	2 (Note: Appearances in UEFA Europa Conference League)	0	1 (Note: Appearance in Belarusian Super Cup)	0	36	4
BATE Borisov	2023	Belarusian Premier League	15	1	5	0	8 (Note: Four appearances and one goal in UEFA Champions League, two in UEFA Europa League, two in UEFA Europa Conference League)	1	0	0	28	2
BATE Borisov	Total		49	5	16	0	10	1	1	0	76	6
Slavia Mozyr (loan)	2020	Belarusian Premier League	17	2	2	0	—		—		19	2
Slavia Mozyr (loan)	2021	Belarusian Premier League	14	2	—		—		—		14	2
Ural	2023–24	Russian Premier League	11	0	4	0	—		0	0	15	0
Ural	2024–25	Russian First League	12	0	5	0	—		2 (Note: Appearances in promotion play-offs)	0	19	0
Ural	2025–26	Russian First League	25	0	0	0	—		2	0	27	0
Ural	Total		48	0	9	0	0	0	4	0	61	0
Career total			128	9	27	0	10	1	5	0	170	10

=== International ===
As of match played 5 June 2026

Appearances and goals by national team and year
National team	Year	Apps	Goals
Belarus	2022	8	1
Belarus	2023	4	0
Belarus	2024	3	0
Belarus	2025	3	0
Belarus	2026	2	1
Total		20	2

Scores and results list Belarus' goal tally first.

No	Date	Venue	Opponent	Score	Result	Competition
1.	10 June 2022	Karađorđe Stadium, Novi Sad, Serbia	Kazakhstan	1–1	1–1	2022–23 Nations League
2.	9 June 2026	National Football Stadium, Minsk, Belarus	Burkina Faso	1–0	2–2	Friendly

== Honours ==
BATE Borisov

- Belarusian Premier League champion: 2016, 2018
- Belarusian Cup winner: 2020–21
- Belarusian Super Cup winner: 2017, 2022
