= Kanstantsin =

Kanstantsin is a given name. Notable people with the name include:

- Kanstantsin Barycheuski (born 1990), Belarusian long jumper
- Kanstantsin Dzehtsiarou, scholar of human rights law in the University of Liverpool
- Kanstantsin Klimiankou (born 1989), Belarusian cyclist
- Kanstantsin Lepin (born 1988), Belarusian footballer
- Kanstantsin Lukashyk (born 1975), Belarusian pistol shooter
- Kanstantsin Shcharbak, Belarusian sprint canoeist
- Kanstantsin Siamionau (born 1978), Belarusian judoka
- Kanstantsin Sivtsov (born 1982), Belarusian road bicycle racer
