= Denis Trapashko =

Belarusian footballer

Personal information
- Date of birth: 17 May 1990 (age 36)
- Place of birth: Chervyen’, Minsk Oblast, Belarusian SSR
- Height: 1.86 m (6 ft 1 in)
- Position: Forward

Team information
- Current team: Kolos Chervyen

Youth career
- Zvezda-BGU Minsk

Senior career*
Years	Team	Apps	(Gls)
2009–2011	Zvezda-BGU Minsk	70	(36)
2012–2014	Smolevichi-STI	75	(52)
2014	→ Torpedo-BelAZ Zhodino (loan)	7	(0)
2014–2016	Torpedo-BelAZ Zhodino	13	(1)
2015	→ Slavia Mozyr (loan)	14	(4)
2017–2019	Slavia Mozyr	51	(7)
2019	Belshina Bobruisk	12	(0)
2020	Naftan Novopolotsk	23	(5)
2021	Rogachev	13	(9)
2022–	Kolos Chervyen	24	(11)
- * Club domestic league appearances and goals as of 31 December 2023

Denis Trapashko (Belarusian: Дзяніс Трапашко; Russian: Денис Трапашко; born 17 May 1990) is a Belarusian footballer playing currently for Kolos Chervyen.

== Honours ==
Torpedo-BelAZ Zhodino

- Belarusian Cup winner: 2015–16
