= Ioan Filip =

Romanian footballer (born 1989)

Personal information
- Full name: Ioan Constantin Filip
- Date of birth: 20 May 1989 (age 37)
- Place of birth: Criștioru de Jos, Romania
- Height: 1.87 m (6 ft 2 in)
- Position: Defensive midfielder

Team information
- Current team: Bihor Oradea
- Number: 16

Youth career
- 1999–2005: FC Oradea

Senior career*
Years	Team	Apps	(Gls)
2005–2010	Bihor Oradea	54	(3)
2005–2007	→ Minerul Ștei (loan)		
2007–2008	→ Luceafărul-Lotus Băile Felix (loan)		
2010–2014	Oțelul Galați	83	(4)
2014–2015	Petrolul Ploiești	24	(0)
2015–2016	Viitorul Constanța	38	(1)
2016–2018	Debrecen	43	(0)
2019–2020	Dinamo București	39	(1)
2020–2021	Universitatea Cluj	17	(2)
2021–2022	Gaz Metan Mediaș	22	(2)
2022–2024	Universitatea Cluj	60	(3)
2024	Botoșani	17	(0)
2024–	Bihor Oradea	62	(12)
- * Club domestic league appearances and goals as of 17 October 2026

Ioan Constantin Filip (born 20 May 1989) is a Romanian professional footballer who plays as a defensive midfielder for Liga II club Bihor Oradea.

== Career statistics ==
As of games played as of 17 October 2026.'

Appearances and goals by club, season and competition
Club	Season	League			National cup (Note: Includes Cupa României, Magyar Kupa)		Europe		Other		Total	
Club	Season	Division	Apps	Goals	Apps	Goals	Apps	Goals	Apps	Goals	Apps	Goals
Minerul Ștei (loan)	2005–06	Divizia D	?	?	?	?	—		—		?	?
Minerul Ștei (loan)	2006–07	Liga IV	?	?	?	?	—		—		?	?
Minerul Ștei (loan)	Total		?	?	?	?	—		—		?	?
Luceafărul-Lotus Băile Felix (loan)	2007–08	Liga III	?	?	?	?	—		—		?	?
Bihor Oradea	2008–09	Liga II	31	1	0	0	—		—		31	1
Bihor Oradea	2009–10	Liga II	23	2	1	0	—		—		24	2
Bihor Oradea	Total		54	3	1	0	—		—		55	3
Oțelul Galați	2010–11	Liga I	11	0	0	0	—		—		11	0
Oțelul Galați	2011–12	Liga I	29	2	1	0	6 (Note: Appearances in UEFA Champions League)	0	0	0	36	2
Oțelul Galați	2012–13	Liga I	18	1	3	0	—		—		21	1
Oțelul Galați	2013–14	Liga I	25	1	3	1	—		—		28	2
Oțelul Galați	Total		83	4	7	1	6	0	0	0	096	5
Petrolul Ploiești	2014–15	Liga I	24	0	4	0	—		—		28	0
Viitorul Constanța	2015–16	Liga I	34	1	3	0	—		1 (Note: Appearance in Cupa Ligii)	0	37	1
Viitorul Constanța	2016–17	Liga I	4	0	0	0	1 (Note: Appearance in UEFA Europa League)	0	—		5	0
Viitorul Constanța	Total		38	1	3	0	1	0	1	0	43	1
Debrecen	2016–17	Nemzeti Bajnokság I	25	0	—		—		—		25	0
Debrecen	2017–18	Nemzeti Bajnokság I	18	0	8	0	—		—		26	0
Debrecen	Total		43	0	8	0	—		—		51	0
Dinamo București	2018–19	Liga I	14	0	0	0	—		—		14	0
Dinamo București	2019–20	Liga I	25	1	4	0	—		—		29	1
Dinamo București	Total		39	1	4	0	—		—		43	1
Universitatea Cluj	2020–21	Liga II	17	2	2	0	—		—		19	2
Gaz Metan Mediaș	2021–22	Liga I	22	2	2	0	—		—		24	2
Universitatea Cluj	2021–22	Liga II	13	0	—		—		2 (Note: Appearances in Liga I promotion play-offs)	0	15	0
Universitatea Cluj	2022–23	Liga I	37	3	5	0	—		—		42	3
Universitatea Cluj	2023–24	Liga I	10	0	0	0	—		—		10	0
Universitatea Cluj	Total		60	3	5	0	—		2	0	67	3
Botoșani	2023–24	Liga I	17	0	—		—		2	0	19	0
Bihor Oradea	2024–25	Liga II	23	2	1	0	—		—		24	2
Bihor Oradea	2025–26	Liga II	29	6	1	0	—		—		30	6
Bihor Oradea	2026–27	Liga II	10	4	2	0	—		—		12	4
Bihor Oradea	Total		62	12	4	0	—		—		66	12
Career total			459	28	40	1	7	0	5	0	511	29

== Honours ==
Luceafărul-Lotus Băile Felix

- Liga III: 2007–08

Oțelul Galați

- Liga I: 2010–11
- Supercupa României: 2011

Viitorul Constanța

- Liga I: 2016–17

Universitatea Cluj

- Cupa României runner-up: 2022–23
