= Yevgeny Milevsky =

Belarusian footballer

Personal information
- Date of birth: 14 January 1995 (age 31)
- Place of birth: Gomel, Belarus
- Height: 1.86 m (6 ft 1 in)
- Position: Midfielder

Youth career
- 2011–2012: Gomel

Senior career*
Years	Team	Apps	(Gls)
2013–2018	Gomel	79	(2)
2018	UAS Zhitkovichi	11	(0)
2019–2020	Gomel	25	(1)
2021	Volna Pinsk	27	(1)
2022–2025	Lokomotiv Gomel	107	(1)

International career^{‡}
2015	Belarus U21	8	(1)
- * Club domestic league appearances and goals as of 9 April 2026 ‡ National team caps and goals as of 15 June 2015

Yevgeny Milevsky (Belarusian: Яўген Мілеўскі; Russian: Евгений Милевский; born 14 January 1995) is a Belarusian professional footballer.
