= Ivan Sulim =

Belarusian footballer

Personal information
- Date of birth: 4 May 1989 (age 37)
- Place of birth: Gomel, Belarusian SSR
- Height: 1.78 m (5 ft 10 in)
- Position: Midfielder

Youth career
- 2004–2008: Gomel

Senior career*
Years	Team	Apps	(Gls)
2009–2010	Gomel	5	(0)
2009	→ DSK Gomel (loan)	11	(0)
2010	→ DSK Gomel (loan)	7	(0)
2011–2012	SKVICH Minsk	45	(0)
2013–2014	Rechitsa-2014	56	(1)
2015	Gomel	19	(0)
2016–2017	Slavia Mozyr	29	(0)
2018	UAS Zhitkovichi	9	(0)
2022–2023	Leskhoz Gomel	32	(5)
- * Club domestic league appearances and goals as of 31 December 2023

Ivan Sulim (Belarusian: Іван Сулім; Russian: Иван Вячеславович Сулим; born 4 May 1989) is a Belarusian former professional footballer.
