= Yury Pavlyukovets =

Belarusian footballer

Personal information
- Date of birth: 24 June 1994 (age 32)
- Place of birth: Pinsk, Brest Oblast, Belarus
- Height: 1.74 m (5 ft 8 1/2 in)
- Position: Midfielder

Team information
- Current team: Neman Grodno
- Number: 32

Youth career
- 2011–2013: Dinamo Brest

Senior career*
Years	Team	Apps	(Gls)
2013–2015	Dinamo Brest	31	(0)
2016–2017	Torpedo-BelAZ Zhodino	8	(0)
2017	Volna Pinsk	13	(2)
2018	UAS Zhitkovichi	11	(1)
2018–2019	Belshina Bobruisk	38	(3)
2020–2021	Torpedo-BelAZ Zhodino	33	(0)
2022–	Neman Grodno	80	(1)

International career^{‡}
2015–2016	Belarus U21	4	(0)
- * Club domestic league appearances and goals as of 1 December 2025 ‡ National team caps and goals as of 7 September 2016

Yury Pavlyukovets (Belarusian: Юры Паўлюковец; Russian: Юрий Павлюковец; born 24 June 1994) is a Belarusian professional footballer who plays for Neman Grodno.

== Honours ==
Torpedo-BelAZ Zhodino

- Belarusian Cup winner: 2015–16
