= Aleksandr Dzhigero =

Belarusian professional footballer

Personal information
- Date of birth: 15 April 1996 (age 30)
- Place of birth: Minsk, Belarus
- Height: 1.73 m (5 ft 8 in)
- Position: Midfielder

Team information
- Current team: Slavia Mozyr
- Number: 49

Youth career
- 2013–2015: BATE Borisov

Senior career*
Years	Team	Apps	(Gls)
2015–2018	BATE Borisov	16	(0)
2015	→ Zvezda-BGU Minsk (loan)	13	(2)
2017	→ Dnepr Mogilev (loan)	13	(1)
2018	→ Luch Minsk (loan)	14	(2)
2019	Torpedo Minsk	15	(1)
2019–2020	Smolevichi	38	(8)
2021	Neman Grodno	26	(4)
2022	Minsk	29	(2)
2023	Okzhetpes	10	(0)
2023–	Slavia Mozyr	74	(1)

International career
2013	Belarus U17	1	(0)
2014	Belarus U19	3	(0)
2016–2018	Belarus U21	11	(1)
- * Club domestic league appearances and goals as of 6 July 2026

Aleksandr Dzhigero (Belarusian: Аляксандр Джыгера; Russian: Александр Джигеро; born 15 April 1996) is a Belarusian professional footballer who plays for Slavia Mozyr.

== Honours ==
BATE Borisov

- Belarusian Premier League champion: 2015, 2016, 2017
- Belarusian Super Cup winner: 2017
