= Dmytro Osadchyi (footballer, born August 1992) =

Ukrainian footballer

Dmytro Osadchyi Дмитро Сергійович Осадчий
Personal information
- Full name: Dmytro Serhiyovych Osadchyi
- Date of birth: 5 August 1992 (age 34)
- Place of birth: Kirovohrad, Ukraine
- Height: 1.80 m (5 ft 11 in)
- Position: Midfielder

Team information
- Current team: F.C. Kiryat Yam

Youth career
- 2004–2006: Youth Sportive School 2 Kirovohrad
- 2006–2009: RVUFK Kyiv

Senior career*
Years	Team	Apps	(Gls)
2009	CSKA Kyiv	9	(0)
2009–2011	Dynamo Kyiv	0	(0)
2009	→ Dynamo-2 Kyiv	4	(1)
2010	→ Sumy (loan)	13	(3)
2011	→ Oleksandriya (loan)	0	(0)
2011–2014	Zirka Kirovohrad	73	(5)
2015–2016	Granit Mikashevichi	22	(0)
2016	Hirnyk-Sport Komsomolsk	7	(0)
2017	Hapoel Beit She'an	10	(1)
2017–2018	Tzeirei Kafr Kanna	29	(2)
2018–2019	Haifa Robi Shapira	9	(1)
2019–2020	Ironi Nesher	22	(6)
2020–2021	Maccabi Ironi Tirat HaCarmel	17	(0)
2021	Maccabi Ahi Iksal	8	(0)
2021–2022	Maccabi Umm al-Fahm	24	(1)
2022–2023	F.C. Kiryat Yam	29	(2)
2023–	Ahva Arraba	6	(1)

International career
2009	Ukraine-18	3	(0)
- * Club domestic league appearances and goals as of 31 December 2023

Dmytro Serhiyovych Osadchyi (Ukrainian: Дмитро Сергійович Осадчий; born 5 August 1992) is a Ukrainian football midfielder who plays for F.C. Kiryat Yam.

== Career ==
Osadchyi is a product of the Kirovohrad and Kyiv youth sportive school systems.

He played in the Ukrainian Second League (FC CSKA Kyiv, FC Sumy) and in the Ukrainian First League (FC Dynamo-2 Kyiv, FC Zirka Kirovohrad) clubs. In February 2015 he signed a contract with the Belarusian Premier League club FC Granit Mikashevichi.

In 2017, he moved to Israel and accepted Israeli citizenship.
