= Pavel Chelyadko =

Belarusian footballer

Personal information
- Date of birth: 3 March 1993 (age 33)
- Place of birth: Baranovichi, Brest Oblast, Belarus
- Height: 1.77 m (5 ft 10 in)
- Positions: Right-back; left-back

Senior career*
Years	Team	Apps	(Gls)
2010	Beltransgaz Slonim	16	(0)
2011–2013	Slavia Mozyr	67	(1)
2014	Dnepr Mogilev	26	(0)
2015	Dinamo Brest	23	(0)
2016	Torpedo-BelAZ Zhodino	14	(0)
2017–2018	Slavia Mozyr	36	(2)
2019–2020	Rukh Brest	27	(0)
2020	Dinamo Malorita	19	(2)
2021–2023	Orlęta Radzyń Podlaski	71	(4)

International career
2013	Belarus U21	1	(0)
- * Club domestic league appearances and goals as of 23:15, 20 June 2023 (UTC)

Pavel Chelyadko (Belarusian: Павел Чалядка; Russian: Павел Челядко; (born 3 March 1993) is a Belarusian professional footballer who plays as a full-back.

== Honours ==
Torpedo-BelAZ Zhodino

- Belarusian Cup: 2015–16
