= Dmitriy Migas =

Belarusian footballer

Personal information
- Date of birth: 25 February 1980 (age 46)
- Place of birth: Bobruisk, Mogilev Oblast, Byelorussian SSR, Soviet Union
- Position: Midfielder

Senior career*
Years	Team	Apps	(Gls)
1997	Khimvolokno-Dnepr-2 Mogilev	16	(1)
1998–1999	Belshina Bobruisk	35	(1)
1999	→ Berezina Bobruisk	14	(3)
2000–2002	Molodechno-2000	41	(2)
2002	Torpedo-MAZ Minsk	12	(1)
2003	Belshina Bobruisk	19	(0)
2004	Dnepr-Transmash Mogilev	14	(1)
2005–2007	Khimik Svetlogorsk	75	(5)
2008	Belshina Bobruisk	23	(1)
2009	Khimik Svetlogorsk		
2010–2011	Osipovichi		

Managerial career
- 2017–2018: Belshina Bobruisk (youth)
- 2019–2020: Belshina Bobruisk (reserves)
- 2020–2021: Belshina Bobruisk
- 2021–2024: Belshina Bobruisk (assistant)
- 2024–2025: Belshina Bobruisk
- * Club domestic league appearances and goals

Dmitriy Migas (Belarusian: Дзмітрый Мігас; Russian: Дмитрий Мигас; born 25 February 1980) is a Belarusian association football coach and former player (midfielder).

== Honours ==
Belshina Bobruisk

- Belarusian Cup winner: 1998–99
