= Dzyanis Kavalewski =

Belarusian footballer

Personal information
- Date of birth: 2 May 1992 (age 34)
- Place of birth: Orsha, Vitebsk Oblast, Belarus
- Height: 1.83 m (6 ft 0 in)
- Position: Defender

Youth career
- 2010–2011: Dinamo Minsk

Senior career*
Years	Team	Apps	(Gls)
2011–2012	Dinamo Minsk	0	(0)
2011	→ Dinamo-2 Minsk	23	(1)
2012	→ Slavia Mozyr (loan)	25	(0)
2013	Slavia Mozyr	28	(0)
2014–2015	Dinamo Brest	49	(1)
2016–2020	Slavia Mozyr	94	(9)
2020	Belshina Bobruisk	8	(0)
2021	Minsk	21	(0)
2022	Znamya Truda Orekhovo-Zuyevo	8	(1)
2022	Maxline Rogachev	5	(0)

International career^{‡}
2013	Belarus U21	10	(2)
- * Club domestic league appearances and goals as of 31 December 2022 ‡ National team caps and goals as of 5 November 2014

Dzyanis Kavalewski (Belarusian: Дзяніс Кавалеўскi; Russian: Денис Ковалевский; born 2 May 1992) is a Belarusian former footballer.
