= Aleksandr Kulbako =

Belarusian footballer

Personal information
- Date of birth: 7 June 1990 (age 36)
- Place of birth: Belarusian SSR
- Height: 1.77 m (5 ft 10 in)
- Position: Midfielder

Youth career
- 2007–2011: Partizan Minsk

Senior career*
| Years | Team | Apps | (Gls) |
| 2007 | MTZ-RIPO-2 Minsk | 26 | (0) |
| 2011 | Partizan-2 Minsk | 28 | (9) |
| 2012–2014 | Minsk | 1 | (0) |
| 2012–2014 | → Minsk-2 | 63 | (9) |
| 2015–2016 | Smolevichi-STI | 26 | (3) |
- * Club domestic league appearances and goals

Aleksandr Kulbako (Belarusian: Аляксандр Кульбака; Russian: Александр Кульбако; born 7 June 1990) is a Belarusian former footballer.
