= Artur Saramakha =

Belarusian footballer

Personal information
- Date of birth: 6 June 1998 (age 28)
- Place of birth: Minsk, Belarus
- Height: 1.73 m (5 ft 8 in)
- Position: Forward

Youth career
- 2013–2017: Dinamo Minsk

Senior career*
Years	Team	Apps	(Gls)
2015–2018	Dinamo Minsk	1	(0)
2018	→ Oshmyany (loan)	13	(1)
2019–2020	Arsenal Dzerzhinsk	21	(3)
2020	→ Slonim-2017 (loan)	25	(1)
2021–2022	Molodechno	28	(21)
2023	Urozhaynaya Minsk	1	(1)

International career
2013–2015	Belarus U17		
- * Club domestic league appearances and goals as of 31 December 2023

Artur Saramakha (Belarusian: Артур Сарамаха; Russian: Артур Сарамаха; born 6 June 1998) is a Belarusian professional football player.
