= Vladislav Zhuk =

Belarusian footballer

Personal information
- Date of birth: 11 June 1994 (age 32)
- Place of birth: Stolbtsy, Minsk Oblast, Belarus
- Height: 1.74 m (5 ft 8 1/2 in)
- Position: Midfielder

Team information
- Current team: Maxline Vitebsk
- Number: 18

Youth career
- 2011–2012: BATE Borisov

Senior career*
Years	Team	Apps	(Gls)
2012–2015	Zvezda-BGU Minsk	90	(14)
2016	Slavia Mozyr	28	(2)
2017–2018	BATE Borisov	0	(0)
2017	→ Slavia Mozyr (loan)	18	(1)
2018	→ Smolevichi (loan)	16	(0)
2018	→ Slutsk (loan)	8	(0)
2019–2023	Slavia Mozyr	92	(6)
2024–	Maxline Vitebsk	52	(2)

International career
2014–2016	Belarus U21	14	(0)
- * Club domestic league appearances and goals as of 4 July 2026

Vladislav Zhuk (Belarusian: Уладзіслаў Жук; Russian: Владислав Жук; born 11 June 1994) is a Belarusian professional footballer who plays for Maxline Vitebsk.

== Honours ==
BATE Borisov

- Belarusian Super Cup winner: 2017
