= Mikita Shuhunkow =

Belarusian footballer

Personal information
- Date of birth: 17 April 1992 (age 34)
- Place of birth: Mogilev, Belarus
- Height: 1.87 m (6 ft 2 in)
- Position: Forward

Team information
- Current team: Kolos Chervyen

Youth career
- 2007–2009: Dnepr Mogilev

Senior career*
Years	Team	Apps	(Gls)
2010–2011	Naftan Novopolotsk	3	(0)
2012	Vitebsk	14	(3)
2013–2016	Naftan Novopolotsk	69	(2)
2017	Belshina Bobruisk	18	(1)
2018	Naftan Novopolotsk	27	(3)
2019	Smorgon	20	(2)
2020	Orsha	21	(6)
2021	Shakhtyor Petrikov	6	(0)
2022	Veles-2020 Vitebsk	20	(12)
2023–	Kolos Chervyen	11	(5)
- * Club domestic league appearances and goals as of 31 December 2023

Mikita Shuhunkow (Belarusian: Мікіта Шугункоў; Russian: Никита Шугунков; born 17 April 1992) is a Belarusian professional football player.

== Honours ==
Naftan Novopolotsk

- Belarusian Cup winner: 2011–12
