= Alyaksandr Matsyukhevich =

Belarusian footballer

Personal information
- Date of birth: 2 April 1990 (age 36)
- Place of birth: Brest, Belarusian SSR
- Height: 1.82 m (6 ft 0 in)
- Position: Midfielder

Youth career
- 2007–2010: Dinamo Brest

Senior career*
Years	Team	Apps	(Gls)
2010–2014	Dinamo Brest	69	(4)
2010	→ Volna Pinsk (loan)	4	(0)
2015	Baranovichi	27	(5)
2016–2017	GKS Wikielec		
2018	Slonim-2017	6	(0)
- * Club domestic league appearances and goals as of 31 December 2018

Alyaksandr Matsyukhevich (Belarusian: Аляксандр Мацюхевiч; Russian: Александр Матюхевич; born 2 April 1990) is a former Belarusian footballer.
