= Nándor Kóródi =

Hungarian footballer

Personal information
- Date of birth: 15 August 1999 (age 27)
- Place of birth: Szolnok, Hungary
- Height: 1.83 m (6 ft 0 in)
- Position: Left midfielder

Team information
- Current team: Békéscsaba
- Number: 27

Youth career
- 2007–2009: Püspökladányi LE
- 2009–2018: Debrecen
- 2010–2011: → Létavértes SC 97 (loan)

Senior career*
Years	Team	Apps	(Gls)
2017–2020	Debrecen	1	(0)
2018–2019	→ Balmazújváros (loan)	32	(3)
2019–2020	→ Szeged-Csanád (loan)	19	(8)
2020–2023	Szeged-Csanád	50	(4)
2023–	Békéscsaba	74	(4)
- * Club domestic league appearances and goals as of 31 May 2026

Nándor Kóródi (born 15 August 1999) is a Hungarian professional footballer who plays for Békéscsaba.

== Career ==
On 9 January 2023, Kóródi signed with Békéscsaba.

== Career statistics ==
Appearances and goals by club, season and competition
Club	Season	League		Cup		Europe		Total	
Club	Season	Apps	Goals	Apps	Goals	Apps	Goals	Apps	Goals
Debrecen
Debrecen	2016–17	1	0	0	0	–	–	1	0
Debrecen	Total	1	0	0	0	0	0	1	0
Balmazújváros
Balmazújváros	2018–19	32	3	0	0	–	–	32	3
Balmazújváros	Total	32	3	0	0	0	0	32	3
Career total		33	3	0	0	0	0	33	3

Updated to games played as of 19 May 2019.
