= Igor Kovalevich =

Belarusian footballer (born 1968)

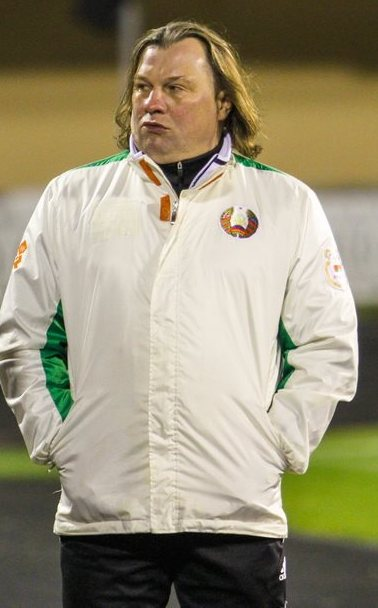
- Kovalevich coaching Belarus U21 in 2016

Personal information
- Full name: Igor Nikolayevich Kovalevich
- Date of birth: 3 February 1968 (age 58)
- Place of birth: Ivanava, Belarusian SSR, Soviet Union
- Position: Defender

Team information
- Current team: Neman Grodno (head coach)

Senior career*
Years	Team	Apps	(Gls)
1988–1989	SKIF Minsk		
1990	Metallurg Molodechno		
1991	Luch Vladivostok	4	(0)
1992–1993	Dinamo Brest	39	(2)
1993	Dnepr Mogilev	3	(0)
1994–1995	Dinamo-Gazovik Tyumen	23	(0)
1996	Irtysh Tobolsk	25	(3)
1997–1999	Belshina Bobruisk	67	(11)
2000	Gomel	20	(1)
2001–2003	Neman Grodno	67	(3)
2004–2005	Slavia Mozyr	28	(0)
2004	Khazar Lankaran	15	(0)

Managerial career
- 2006–2007: Naftan Novopolotsk (reserves)
- 2007–2012: Naftan Novopolotsk
- 2008–2011: Belarus U21 (assistant)
- 2011–2012: Belarus Olympic (assistant)
- 2013–2016: Belarus U21
- 2016–: Neman Grodno
- * Club domestic league appearances and goals

Igor Nikolayevich Kovalevich (Belarusian: Iгар Мiкалаевiч Кавалевiч; Russian: Игорь Николаевич Ковалевич; born 3 February 1968) is a Belarusian professional football coach and former player. Since 2016, he is the head coach of Neman Grodno.

He played youth football with SDYUSHOR-5.

He graduated from the Belarusian State University majoring in physical culture in 1990.

== Managerial statistics ==
As of 21 May 2024

Managerial record by team and tenure
Team	Nat	From	To	Record							
Team	Nat	From	To	G	W	D	L	GF	GA	GD	Win %
Naftan Novopolotsk	(Belarus)	14 May 2007	12 December 2012	198	76	46	76	248	253	−5	38.38
Belarus U21	(Belarus)	14 September 2013	1 December 2016	38	13	6	19	49	50	−1	34.21
Neman Grodno	(Belarus)	17 June 2016	Present	273	123	61	89	372	291	+81	45.05
Total				509	212	113	184	669	594	+75	41.65

== Honours ==
=== As player ===
Belshina Bobruisk

- Belarusian Cup winner: 1996–97, 1998–99

=== As coach ===
Naftan Novopolotsk

- Belarusian Cup winner: 2008–09, 2011–12

Neman Grodno

- Belarusian Cup winner: 2023–24
