= Sergey Turanok =

Belarusian footballer

Personal information
- Date of birth: 23 March 1986 (age 40)
- Place of birth: Antosino, Dzyarzhynsk Raion, Minsk Oblast, Belarusian SSR
- Height: 1.94 m (6 ft 4 1/2 in)
- Position: Goalkeeper

Team information
- Current team: Yedinstvo Dzerzhinsk; Isloch Minsk Raion (GK youth coach)

Youth career
- 2001–2003: Livadiya Dzerzhinsk

Senior career*
Years	Team	Apps	(Gls)
2003	Livadiya Dzerzhinsk	12	(0)
2004–2005	Torpedo-SKA Minsk	10	(0)
2006	Kommunalnik Slonim	11	(0)
2007–2008	Torpedo Zhodino	0	(0)
2009–2010	Khimik Svetlogorsk	50	(0)
2011–2013	Gorodeya	54	(0)
2014	Khimik Svetlogorsk	30	(0)
2015–2018	Isloch Minsk Raion	62	(0)
2019–2020	Belshina Bobruisk	24	(0)
2021	Molodechno	15	(0)
2022–	Yedinstvo Dzerzhinsk	23	(0)

Managerial career
- 2021–: Isloch Minsk Raion (GK youth coach)
- * Club domestic league appearances and goals as of 31 December 2023

Sergey Turanok (Belarusian: Сяргей Туранок; Russian: Сергей Туранок; born 23 March 1986) is a Belarusian professional footballer who plays for Yedinstvo Dzerzhinsk.
