= Filipp Postnikov =

Russian footballer

Personal information
- Full name: Filipp Vitalyevich Postnikov
- Date of birth: 10 April 1989 (age 37)
- Place of birth: Leningrad, Soviet Union
- Height: 1.79 m (5 ft 10 1/2 in)
- Position: Midfielder

Senior career*
Years	Team	Apps	(Gls)
2006	FC Yevrostroy Vsevolzhsk		
2007	Zenit Saint Petersburg	0	(0)
2008	FC Yevrostroy Vsevolzhsk		
2009	Dynamo-2 Saint Petersburg (amateur)		
2009–2010	FC Lavina Sertolovo		
2011–2012	FC Silnar-Fakel Saint Petersburg		
2012	FC Nevsky Front Saint Petersburg		
2013	Myllypuro	4	(1)
2013	Dynamo Kirov	8	(0)
2014	Khimik Dzerzhinsk	3	(0)
2015	Zvezda Saint Petersburg (amateur)		
2015	Vitebsk	1	(0)
- * Club domestic league appearances and goals

Filipp Vitalyevich Postnikov (Russian: Филипп Витальевич Постников; born 10 April 1989) is a former Russian football midfielder.

== Club career ==
He played in the Russian Football National League for FC Khimik Dzerzhinsk in 2014.
