= Pavel Shorats =

Belarusian footballer

Personal information
- Date of birth: 30 January 1998 (age 28)
- Place of birth: Lida, Belarus
- Height: 1.80 m (5 ft 11 in)
- Position: Defender

Youth career
- 2013–2014: Lida

Senior career*
Years	Team	Apps	(Gls)
2014–2018	Lida	60	(6)
2018	Morzycko Moryń	11	(2)
2019	Lida	13	(0)
2019–2020	Energetik-BGU Minsk	8	(0)
2020	→ Lida (loan)	8	(1)
2021–2024	Lida	97	(7)

International career
2013	Belarus U17	1	(1)
- * Club domestic league appearances and goals as of 7 April 2026

Pavel Shorats (Russian: Павел Шорац; born 30 January 1998) is a Belarusian professional football player.
