= FC Yedinstvo Dzerzhinsk =

Yedinstvo Dzerzhinsk
- Full name: FC Yedinstvo Dzerzhinsk
- Founded: 1999
- Ground: City Stadium, Dzerzhinsk
- Head Coach: (Ukraine) Kostyantyn Yashchenko
- League: Belarusian Second League
- 2015: 18th

FC Yedinstvo Dzerzhinsk is a Belarusian football club based in Dzerzhinsk, Minsk Oblast.

== History ==
The team was founded in 1999 as Livadiya Dzerzhinsk and joined Belarusian Second League in 2003. In 2015 they were renamed to Krutogorye Dzerzhinsk. In 2016 the club withdrew from the Second League and was renamed to Livadiya-Yuni Dzerzhinsk (a name previously used by club's reserve team). Since 2016 they play in Minsk Oblast league.

In 2021 the club returned to the Second League with the new name Yedinstvo Dzerzhinsk.

== Current squad ==
As of July 2024 Note: Flags indicate national team as defined under FIFA eligibility rules; some limited exceptions apply. Players may hold more than one non-FIFA nationality.

No.	Pos.	Nation	Player
—	GK	(Belarus) BLR	Vitaliy Gavrilchuk
—	GK	(Belarus) BLR	Yaroslav Klyuchnik
—	GK	(Belarus) BLR	Sergey Turanok
—	DF	(Belarus) BLR	Roman Belonozhko
—	DF	(Belarus) BLR	Sergey Gorevalov
—	DF	(Belarus) BLR	Vadim Goroshko
—	DF	(Belarus) BLR	Daniil Goryachko
—	DF	(Belarus) BLR	Yan Skvarchevskiy
—	DF	(Belarus) BLR	Yegor Sosnovich
—	DF	(Belarus) BLR	Vitaly Stomal
—	DF	(Belarus) BLR	Dmitry Stomal
—	DF	(Belarus) BLR	Nikita Shpilevskiy
—	MF	(Belarus) BLR	Igor Bobrik
—	MF	(Belarus) BLR	Dmitriy Burtsev
—	MF	(Belarus) BLR	Andrey Vasyakin
—	MF	(Belarus) BLR	Oleg Gerasimovich

No.	Pos.	Nation	Player
—	MF	(Belarus) BLR	Matvey Yefremov
—	MF	(Belarus) BLR	Ilya Kravtsov
—	MF	(Belarus) BLR	Irakli Magradze
—	MF	(Belarus) BLR	Artem Palchikov
—	MF	(Belarus) BLR	Yegor Plekhanov
—	MF	(Belarus) BLR	Igor Rogal
—	MF	(Belarus) BLR	Andrey Semashko
—	MF	(Belarus) BLR	Miroslav Tamkovich
—	MF	(Belarus) BLR	Maksim Teterich
—	MF	(Belarus) BLR	Danila Shkarupilo
—	FW	(Belarus) BLR	Yevgeniy Vitkovskiy
—	FW	(Belarus) BLR	Maksim Gradovets
—	FW	(Belarus) BLR	Bogdan Dubovik
—	FW	(Belarus) BLR	Denis Melnikov
—	FW	(Belarus) BLR	Viktor Orlovskiy
—	FW	(Belarus) BLR	Danila Skachko
