= Syarhey Melnik =

Belarusian footballer

Personal information
- Date of birth: 5 July 1995 (age 31)
- Place of birth: Minsk, Belarus
- Height: 1.70 m (5 ft 7 in)
- Position: Midfielder

Youth career
- 2010–2014: Minsk

Senior career*
Years	Team	Apps	(Gls)
2014	Minsk-2	25	(1)
2015	Vitebsk	14	(0)
2017	Baranovichi	8	(0)
2017	Smorgon	12	(0)
2018	Granit Mikashevichi	10	(0)
2018	Chist	9	(2)
2019	Arsenal Dzerzhinsk	28	(1)
2020	Oshmyany	16	(0)
2021	Naftan Novopolotsk	32	(2)
2022–2023	Maxline Vitebsk	44	(7)
2024	Orsha	30	(1)
2025–2026	Unixlabs Minsk	26	(5)
- * Club domestic league appearances and goals as of 19 October 2026

Syarhey Melnik (Belarusian: Сяргей Мельнік; Russian: Сергей Мельник; born 5 July 1995) is a Belarusian professional footballer.
