= Alyaksey Pankavets =

Belarusian footballer (born 1981)

Personal information
- Full name: Alyaksey Yuryevich Pankavets
- Date of birth: 18 April 1981 (age 45)
- Place of birth: Minsk, Belarusian SSR
- Height: 1.80 m (5 ft 11 in)
- Position: Defender

Youth career
- 1996–1997: Ataka Minsk

Senior career*
Years	Team	Apps	(Gls)
1997	Ataka Minsk	16	(2)
1997	→ Ataka-407 Minsk	12	(1)
1998	Kommunalnik Slonim	5	(0)
1999	Smena-BATE Minsk	12	(4)
2000–2002	Torpedo-MAZ Minsk	78	(2)
2003–2006	Gomel	110	(8)
2007–2009	Kharkiv	56	(0)
2009	Minsk	11	(0)
2010–2011	Dinamo Brest	61	(0)
2012	Dinamo Minsk	15	(1)
2013–2017	Torpedo-BelAZ Zhodino	130	(2)

International career^{‡}
2001–2004	Belarus U21	17	(0)
2006	Belarus	2	(0)
- * Club domestic league appearances and goals as of 7 December 2017 ‡ National team caps and goals as of 4 October 2008

Alyaksey Yuryevich Pankavets (Belarusian: Аляксей Юр'евіч Панкавец, Russian: Алексей Юрьевич Панковец, Aleksey Yuryevich Pankovets; born 18 April 1981) is a Belarusian former professional footballer who played as a defender.

== Honours ==
Gomel

- Belarusian Premier League champion: 2003

Torpedo-BelAZ Zhodino

- Belarusian Cup winner: 2015–16
