= Uladzimir Shcherba =

Belarusian footballer

Personal information
- Date of birth: 1 April 1986 (age 40)
- Place of birth: Minsk, Belarusian SSR
- Height: 1.81 m (5 ft 11 in)
- Position: Defender

Team information
- Current team: Niva Dolbizno
- Number: 18

Youth career
- 2003–2004: Dinamo Minsk
- 2005–2006: Dinamo Brest

Senior career*
Years	Team	Apps	(Gls)
2004	Dinamo-Juni Minsk	29	(0)
2007–2010	Dinamo Brest	79	(0)
2011–2012	Gazovik Orenburg	5	(0)
2012	Dnepr Mogilev	8	(0)
2013–2015	Dinamo Brest	66	(6)
2016–2020	Torpedo-BelAZ Zhodino	98	(4)
2021–2023	Dinamo Brest	47	(0)
2024–	Niva Dolbizno	65	(4)
- * Club domestic league appearances and goals as of 6 July 2026

Uladzimir Shcherba (Belarusian: Уладзімір Шчэрба; Russian: Владимир Щербо; born 1 April 1986) is a Belarusian footballer who plays for Niva Dolbizno.

== Honours ==
Dinamo Brest

- Belarusian Cup winner: 2006–07

Torpedo-BelAZ Zhodino

- Belarusian Cup winner: 2015–16
