= Kanstantsin Lepin =

Belarusian footballer

Personal information
- Date of birth: 17 June 1988 (age 38)
- Place of birth: Bobruisk, Mogilev Oblast, Byelorussian SSR, Soviet Union
- Position: Defender

Youth career
- 2004: Belshina Bobruisk
- 2005–2008: Dnepr Mogilev

Senior career*
Years	Team	Apps	(Gls)
2008–2009	Dnepr Mogilev	8	(1)
2010–2011	Khimik Svetlogorsk	49	(1)
2012	Vedrich-97 Rechitsa	12	(0)
2012–2015	Khimik Svetlogorsk	54	(1)
- * Club domestic league appearances and goals as of 1 December 2015

Kanstantsin Lepin (Belarusian: Канстанцін Лепін; Russian: Константин Лепин; born 17 June 1988) is a Belarusian former professional footballer.
