= Yevgeniy Klopotskiy =

Belarusian footballer

Personal information
- Date of birth: 12 August 1993 (age 33)
- Place of birth: Brest, Belarus
- Height: 1.87 m (6 ft 1 1/2 in)
- Position: Defender

Youth career
- 2010–2011: Dinamo Brest

Senior career*
Years	Team	Apps	(Gls)
2011–2015	Dinamo Brest	68	(2)
2016–2017	Torpedo-BelAZ Zhodino	37	(1)
2018–2020	Vitebsk	57	(5)
2021	Rukh Brest	0	(0)

International career^{‡}
2012–2014	Belarus U21	27	(3)
2017	Belarus B	2	(0)
- * Club domestic league appearances and goals as of 31 December 2021 ‡ National team caps and goals as of 16 July 2017

Yevgeniy Klopotskiy (Belarusian: Яўген Клапоцкi; Russian: Евгений Клопоцкий; born 12 August 1993) is a Belarusian former professional footballer.

== International career ==
He was named in Belarus' senior squad for a 2018 FIFA World Cup qualifier against France in September 2016.

== Honours ==
Torpedo-BelAZ Zhodino

- Belarusian Cup winner: 2015–16
