= Andrey Khachaturyan =

Belarusian footballer

Personal information
- Full name: Andrey Vladimirovich Khachaturyan
- Date of birth: 2 September 1987 (age 39)
- Place of birth: Minsk, Byelorussian SSR, Soviet Union
- Height: 1.75 m (5 ft 9 in)
- Position: Midfielder

Team information
- Current team: Maxline Vitebsk
- Number: 10

Senior career*
| Years | Team | Apps | (Gls) |
| 2004–2005 | Smena Minsk | 37 | (6) |
| 2006–2010 | Minsk | 105 | (13) |
| 2010–2011 | Zhemchuzhina-Sochi | 13 | (0) |
| 2011 | → Minsk (loan) | 15 | (3) |
| 2011–2013 | Shakhtyor Soligorsk | 51 | (7) |
| 2014–2015 | Neman Grodno | 20 | (1) |
| 2015 | Torpedo-BelAZ Zhodino | 12 | (2) |
| 2016 | Belshina Bobruisk | 5 | (0) |
| 2016–2023 | Torpedo-BelAZ Zhodino | 128 | (12) |
| 2024– | Maxline Vitebsk | 34 | (8) |

International career^{‡}
| 2006 | Belarus U19 | 3 | (0) |
| 2012–2020 | Belarus | 8 | (0) |
- * Club domestic league appearances and goals as of 10 December 2024 ‡ National team caps and goals as of 18 November 2020

Andrey Vladimirovich Khachaturyan (Belarusian: Андрэй Уладзіміравіч Хачатуран; Russian: Андрей Владимирович Хачатурян; Armenian: Անդրեյ Խաչատուրյան; born on 2 September 1987) is a Belarusian football midfielder of Armenian origin, who is currently playing for Maxline Vitebsk.

== International career ==
He made his first appearance for the senior national side on 15 August 2012 against Armenia in a friendly match.
