= FC UAS Zhitkovichi =

- Full name: Football Club UA-Stroy Zhitkovichi
- Founded: 2014
- Dissolved: 2019
- Ground: City Stadium, Zhitkovichi
- Capacity: 1,000
- League: Belarusian Second League
- 2019: n/a (withdrew)
Home colours	Away colours

FC UAS Zhitkovichi is a Belarusian football club based in Zhitkovichi, Gomel Oblast. The team plays in the Belarusian First League.

== History ==
The club was founded in 2014 as UA-Stroy-Zhitkovichi and joined the Belarusian Second League the same year. In 2015, they played as UAS-DYuSSh Zhitkovichi and in 2016 they settled with the current version of the name (UAS Zhitkovichi). UAS Zhitkovichi won the Second League in 2017 and will make their First League debut in 2018.
