= 2022–23 AFC Bournemouth season =

Bournemouth
2022–23 season
- Owner: Maxim Demin (until 13 December); Black Knight Football Club (from 13 December)
- Chairman: Jeff Mostyn (until 13 December); Bill Foley (from 13 December)
- Head coach: Scott Parker (until 30 August); Gary O'Neil (from 30 August)
- Stadium: Dean Court
- Premier League: 15th
- FA Cup: Third round
- EFL Cup: Fourth round
- Top goalscorer: League: Philip Billing (7); All: Philip Billing; Dominic Solanke (7 each)
- Highest home attendance: 10,536 v Liverpool, Premier League, 11 March 2023
- Lowest home attendance: 9,972 v Crystal Palace, Premier League, 31 December 2022
- Average home league attendance: 10,309
- Biggest win: 4–1 v Everton, EFL Cup, 8 November 2022; 3–0 v Everton, Premier League, 12 November 2022; 4–1 v Leeds United, Premier League, 30 April 2023
- Biggest defeat: 0–9 v Liverpool, Premier League, 27 August 2022
Home colours	Away colours	Third colours

The 2022–23 season was the 121st season in the existence of AFC Bournemouth. It was the club's first campaign back in the Premier League since 2019–20, following promotion in the previous season, making it their sixth season in the top flight overall. In addition to the domestic league, they also participated in the FA Cup and the EFL Cup.

== Transfers ==
=== In ===
Date	Pos	Player	Transferred from	Fee	Ref
10 June 2022	CB	(England) Chris Francis	(England) North Leigh	Undisclosed	
10 June 2022	FW	(England) Dominic Sadi	(England) Wingate & Finchley	Undisclosed	
1 July 2022 (Note: The transfer was announced on 22 June, and would become official on July 1, once his West Ham United contract expired.)	RB	(England) Ryan Fredericks	(England) West Ham United	Free	
1 July 2022 (Note: The transfer was announced on 24 June, and would become official on July 1, once his Blackburn Rovers contract expired.)	CM	(England) Joe Rothwell	(England) Blackburn Rovers	Free	
1 August 2022	LW	(England) Marcus Tavernier	(England) Middlesbrough	£12,500,000	
7 August 2022	GK	(Brazil) Neto	(Spain) Barcelona	Free	
8 August 2022	CB	(Argentina) Marcos Senesi	(Netherlands) Feyenoord	£13,500,000	
19 January 2023	RW	(Burkina Faso) Dango Ouattara	(France) Lorient	£20,000,000	
26 January 2023	GK	(Republic of Ireland) Darren Randolph	(England) West Ham United	Free	
27 January 2023	FW	(Ghana) Antoine Semenyo	(England) Bristol City	£10,500,000	
31 January 2023	CB	(Ukraine) Illia Zabarnyi	(Ukraine) Dynamo Kyiv	£24,000,000	

=== Out ===
Date	Pos	Player	Transferred to	Fee	Ref
30 June 2022	CB	(England) Gary Cahill	Unattached	Released	
30 June 2022	RB	(Scotland) Brennan Camp	(England) Eastleigh	Released	
30 June 2022	CF	(Guyana) Connor Kurran-Browne	(England) Hampton & Richmond Borough	Released	
30 June 2022	CM	(England) Luke Nippard	(England) Weymouth	Released	
30 June 2022	CB	(England) Owen Palmer	Unattached	Released	
30 June 2022	CB	(England) Aaron Roberts	(England) Wimborne Town	Released	
30 June 2022	CB	(England) Jack Seddon	(England) Weymouth	Released	
4 July 2022	LM	(Republic of Ireland) Robbie Brady	(England) Preston North End	Free	
5 July 2022	CB	(England) Sam Sherring	(England) Northampton Town	Compensation	
18 July 2022	CB	(England) Zeno Ibsen Rossi	(England) Cambridge United	Undisclosed	
5 August 2022	RW	(England) Ryan Glover	(England) Aldershot Town	Free	
26 August 2022	CF	(England) Jake Scrimshaw	(England) Yeovil Town	Undisclosed	

=== Loans in ===
Date	Pos	Player	Loaned from	On loan until	Ref
1 September 2022	CB	(England) Jack Stephens	(England) Southampton	End of Season	
30 January 2023	LB	(Uruguay) Matías Viña	(Italy) Roma	End of Season	
31 January 2023	AM	(Ivory Coast) Hamed Traorè	(Italy) Sassuolo	End of Season (Note: The transfer is an initial loan agreement that will become a permanent deal in the summer.)	

=== Loans out ===
Date	Pos	Player	Loaned to	On loan until	Ref
2 July 2022	CM	(Republic of Ireland) Gavin Kilkenny	(England) Stoke City	31 January 2023 (Note: On 31 January, Kilkenny was recalled from his season-long loan at Stoke City and loaned to Charlton Athletic.)	
3 August 2022	RW	(Northern Ireland) Marcus Daws	(England) Poole Town	Work Experience	
5 August 2022	AM	(England) Ferdinand Okoh	(England) Truro City	Work Experience	
10 August 2022	CM	(Guyana) Nathan Moriah-Welsh	(Wales) Newport County	End of Season	
13 August 2022	LB	(France) Noa Boutin	(England) Weymouth	Work Experience	
20 August 2022	GK	(England) Billy Terrell	(England) Weymouth	1 January 2023	
1 September 2022	RB	(England) Brooklyn Genesini	(Denmark) Næstved	End of Season	
1 September 2022	CF	(England) Christian Saydee	(England) Shrewsbury Town	End of Season	
2 September 2022	CB	(Wales) Owen Bevan	(England) Yeovil Town	End of Season	
6 January 2023	CB	(England) Chris Francis	(England) Weymouth	End of Season	
7 January 2023	AM	(England) Ferdinand Okoh	(England) Dorchester Town	End of Season	
9 January 2023	CB	(England) James Hill	(Scotland) Heart of Midlothian	End of Season	
10 January 2023	RW	(Jamaica) Jamal Lowe	(England) Queens Park Rangers	End of Season	
10 January 2023	AM	(Denmark) Emiliano Marcondes	(Denmark) FC Nordsjælland	End of Season	
20 January 2023	GK	(England) Will Dennis	(England) Slough Town	End of Season	
26 January 2023	LB	(France) Noa Boutin	(England) Gosport Borough	Work Experience	
31 January 2023	FW	(Scotland) Siriki Dembélé	(France) Auxerre	End of Season	
31 January 2023	CM	(Republic of Ireland) Gavin Kilkenny	(England) Charlton Athletic	End of Season	
31 January 2023	CM	(England) Ben Pearson	(England) Stoke City	End of Season	
1 February 2023	CM	(England) Matt Burgess	(England) Slough Town	End of Season	
17 February 2023	CF	(England) Daniel Adu-Adjei	(England) Poole Town	End of Season	
23 March 2023	LW	(England) Baylin Johnson	(England) Dorchester Town	Work Experience	
24 March 2023	GK	(England) Mack Allan	(England) AFC Totton	End of Season	
24 March 2023	CB	(England) Max Kinsey	(England) Gosport Borough	Work Experience	

== Pre-season and friendlies ==
The Cherries announced their first pre-season friendly on June 2, against Real Sociedad. A second announcement was made twelve days later, against Bristol City. A pre-season training camp in Portugal, along with two matches against Sheffield Wednesday and Braga was also confirmed.

Win Draw Loss Fixtures

15 July 2022 Friendly	Bournemouth	2–1	Sheffield Wednesday	Algarve, Portugal
TBA WEST	Cook 45'; Solanke 56'	Report	Dele-Bashiru 79'	Attendance: 0 (behind-closed-doors)

19 July 2022 Friendly	Braga (Portugal)	2–1	(England) Bournemouth	Algarve, Portugal
TBA WEST	Castro 11'; Gomes 89'	Report	Solanke 4'	Attendance: 0 (behind-closed-doors)

23 July 2022 Friendly	Bournemouth	0–1	Bristol City	Bournemouth
15:00 BST		Report	Martin 49' (pen.)	Stadium: Vitality Stadium

30 July 2022 Friendly	Bournemouth (England)	1–2	(Spain) Real Sociedad	Bournemouth
15:00 BST	Stanislas 81'	Report	Merino 9'; Zubeldia 56'	Stadium: Vitality Stadium; Referee: Michael Salisbury

== Competitions ==
=== Overall record ===
Competition	First match	Last match	Starting round	Final position	Record							
Competition	First match	Last match	Starting round	Final position	Pld	W	D	L	GF	GA	GD	Win %
Premier League	6 August 2022	28 May 2023	Matchday 1	15th	38	11	6	21	37	71	−34	28.95
FA Cup	7 January 2023		Third round	Third round	1	0	0	1	2	4	−2	0.00
EFL Cup	23 August 2022	20 December 2022	Second round	Fourth round	3	1	1	1	6	4	+2	33.33
Total					42	12	7	23	45	79	−34	28.57

Source: Soccerway

=== Premier League ===
==== League table ====
Pos	Team	Pld	W	D	L	GF	GA	GD	Pts	Qualification or relegation
13	Wolverhampton Wanderers	38	11	8	19	31	58	−27	41	
14	West Ham United	38	11	7	20	42	55	−13	40	Qualification to Europa League group stage (Note: West Ham United qualified for the Europa League group stage by winning the 2022–23 UEFA Europa Conference League.)
15	Bournemouth	38	11	6	21	37	71	−34	39	
16	Nottingham Forest	38	9	11	18	38	68	−30	38	
17	Everton	38	8	12	18	34	57	−23	36	

Source: Premier League
Rules for classification: 1) Points; 2) Goal difference; 3) Goals scored; 4) If the champions, relegated teams or qualified teams for UEFA competitions cannot be determined by rules 1 to 3, rules 4.1 to 4.3 are applied – 4.1) Points gained in head-to-head record between such teams; 4.2) Away goals scored in head-to-head record between such teams; 4.3) Play-offs

==== Results summary ====
Overall								Home						Away					
Pld	W	D	L	GF	GA	GD	Pts	W	D	L	GF	GA	GD	W	D	L	GF	GA	GD
38	11	6	21	37	71	−34	39	6	4	9	20	28	−8	5	2	12	17	43	−26

Source: Premier League

==== Results by round ====
Round	1	2	3	4	5	6	7	8	9	10	11	12	13	14	15	16	17	18	19	20	21	22	23	24	25	26	27	28	29	30	31	32	33	34	35	36	37	38
Ground	H	A	H	A	H	A	A	H	H	A	H	A	H	A	H	A	H	A	A	H	A	H	A	H	A	H	A	H	H	A	A	H	A	H	H	A	H	A
Result	W	L	L	L	D	W	D	D	W	D	L	L	L	L	W	L	L	L	L	D	L	D	W	L	L	W	L	W	L	W	W	L	W	W	L	L	L	L
Position	3	11	15	17	16	13	12	13	8	10	12	14	14	17	14	14	15	16	17	18	19	19	17	19	20	18	19	17	18	15	14	15	14	13	14	14	15	15
Points	3	3	3	3	4	7	8	9	12	13	13	13	13	13	16	16	16	16	16	17	17	18	21	21	21	24	24	27	27	30	33	33	36	39	39	39	39	39

Source: Premier League
A = Away; H = Home; W = Win; D = Draw; L = Loss

==== Matches ====
Win Draw Loss Fixtures

On 16 June 2022, the Premier League fixtures were released.

6 August 2022 1	Bournemouth	2–0	Aston Villa	Bournemouth
15:00 BST	Lerma 2'; Smith (yellow card) 39'; Pearson (yellow card) 45+2'; Billing (yellow card) 73'; Moore 80'	Report	Ings (yellow card) 23'; J. Ramsey (yellow card) 45+3'; Douglas Luiz (yellow card) 90+3'	Stadium: Vitality Stadium; Attendance: 10,000; Referee: Peter Bankes

13 August 2022 2	Manchester City	4–0	Bournemouth	Manchester
15:00 BST	Gündoğan 19'; De Bruyne 31'; Foden 37'; Lerma 79' (o.g.)	Report	Stacey (yellow card) 5'; Mepham (yellow card) 57'; Smith (yellow card) 90+1'	Stadium: Etihad Stadium; Attendance: 53,453; Referee: David Coote

20 August 2022 3	Bournemouth	0–3	Arsenal	Bournemouth
17:30 BST	Zemura (yellow card) 27'; Smith (yellow card) 60'	Report	Ødegaard 5', 11'; Gabriel Jesus (yellow card) 52'; Saliba 54'	Stadium: Vitality Stadium; Attendance: 10,423; Referee: Craig Pawson

27 August 2022 4	Liverpool	9–0	Bournemouth	Liverpool
15:00 BST	Díaz 3', 85'; Elliott 6'; Alexander-Arnold 28'; Firmino 31', 62'; Van Dijk 45'; Mepham 46' (o.g.); Carvalho 80'	Report	Smith (yellow card) 35'	Stadium: Anfield; Attendance: 53,328; Referee: Stuart Attwell

31 August 2022 5	Bournemouth	0–0	Wolverhampton Wanderers	Bournemouth
19:30 BST	Neto (yellow card) 67'; Mepham (yellow card) 90'	Report	Neves (yellow card) 90'	Stadium: Vitality Stadium; Attendance: 10,113; Referee: Anthony Taylor

3 September 2022 6	Nottingham Forest	2–3	Bournemouth	West Bridgford
15:00 BST	Kouyaté 33'; Johnson 45+2' (pen.); McKenna (yellow card) 45+4'; Lodi (yellow card) 76'	Report	Neto (yellow card) 45+2'; Billing 51'; Solanke 63'; Anthony 87'	Stadium: City Ground; Attendance: 28,720; Referee: Michael Oliver

17 September 2022 7	Newcastle United	1–1	Bournemouth	Newcastle upon Tyne
15:00 BST	Isak 67' (pen.); Joelinton (yellow card) 69'; Burn (yellow card) 90+7'	Report	Christie (yellow card) 34'; Tavernier (yellow card) 45+3'; Billing 62'	Stadium: St James' Park; Attendance: 52,238; Referee: Craig Pawson

1 October 2022 8	Bournemouth	0–0	Brentford	Bournemouth
15:00 BST	Lerma (yellow card) 75'	Report	Toney (yellow card) 45+2'; Hickey (yellow card) 67'	Stadium: Vitality Stadium; Attendance: 10,126; Referee: Thomas Bramall

8 October 2022 9	Bournemouth	2–1	Leicester City	Bournemouth
15:00 BST	Fredericks (yellow card) 40'; Billing 67'; Christie 71'	Report	Daka 10'; Soumaré (yellow card) 59'; Maddison (yellow card) 88'	Stadium: Vitality Stadium; Attendance: 10,272; Referee: Michael Salisbury

15 October 2022 10	Fulham	2–2	Bournemouth	Fulham
15:00 BST	Diop 22'; Decordova-Reid (yellow card) 38'; Mitrović 52' (pen.); Ream (yellow card) 54'	Report	Solanke 2'; Lerma 29'	Stadium: Craven Cottage; Attendance: 22,913; Referee: Graham Scott

19 October 2022 11	Bournemouth	0–1	Southampton	Bournemouth
19:30 BST	Mepham (yellow card) 43'	Report	Adams 9'; Perraud (yellow card) 15'; Maitland-Niles (yellow card) 43'; S. Armstrong (yellow card) 90+6'	Stadium: Vitality Stadium; Attendance: 10,405; Referee: John Brooks

24 October 2022 12	West Ham United	2–0	Bournemouth	Stratford
20:00 BST	Zouma 45'; Benrahma 90+2' (pen.)	Report	Lerma (yellow card) 55'; Mepham (yellow card) 71'	Stadium: London Stadium; Attendance: 62,447; Referee: David Coote

29 October 2022 13	Bournemouth	2–3	Tottenham Hotspur	Bournemouth
15:00 BST	Moore 22', 49'; Cook (yellow card) 82'	Report	Sessegnon 57', (yellow card) 61'; Kane (yellow card) 69'; Davies 73'; Bentancur 90+2'	Stadium: Vitality Stadium; Attendance: 10,430; Referee: Anthony Taylor

5 November 2022 14	Leeds United	4–3	Bournemouth	Leeds
15:00 GMT	Rodrigo 3' (pen.); Greenwood 60'; Kristensen (yellow card) 62'; Cooper 68'; Summerville 84'; Gelhardt (yellow card) 90+3'	Report	Tavernier 7'; Billing 19'; Lerma (yellow card) 45+1'; Solanke 48'; Mepham (yellow card) 52'	Stadium: Elland Road; Attendance: 36,304; Referee: Tony Harrington

12 November 2022 15	Bournemouth	3–0	Everton	Bournemouth
15:00 GMT	Tavernier 18'; Moore 25'; Senesi (yellow card) 44'; Cook (yellow card) 45+2'; Anthony 69'	Report		Stadium: Vitality Stadium; Attendance: 10,382; Referee: Craig Pawson

Mid-season break for 2022 FIFA World Cup

27 December 2022 16	Chelsea	2–0	Bournemouth	Fulham
17:30 GMT	Havertz 16'; Mount 24'	Report		Stadium: Stamford Bridge; Attendance: 40,046; Referee: Simon Hooper

31 December 2022 17	Bournemouth	0–2	Crystal Palace	Bournemouth
15:00 GMT	Kelly (yellow card) 25'; Anthony (yellow card) 26'; Solanke (yellow card) 67'; Senesi (yellow card) 90'	Report	Ayew 19'; Eze 36'; Andersen (yellow card) 87'	Stadium: Vitality Stadium; Attendance: 9,972; Referee: Andre Marriner

3 January 2023 18	Manchester United	3–0	Bournemouth	Manchester
20:00 GMT	Casemiro 23'; Shaw 49'; Rashford 86'	Report	Billing (yellow card) 36'; Smith (yellow card) 46'; Stacey (yellow card) 75'	Stadium: Old Trafford; Attendance: 73,322; Referee: Michael Salisbury

14 January 2023 19	Brentford	2–0	Bournemouth	Brentford
17:30 GMT	Toney 39' (pen.); Raya (yellow card) 69'; Jensen 75'	Report	Neto (yellow card) 38'	Stadium: Brentford Community Stadium; Attendance: 17,031; Referee: Jarred Gillett

21 January 2023 20	Bournemouth	1–1	Nottingham Forest	Bournemouth
15:00 GMT	Anthony 28'; Kelly (yellow card) 32'	Report	Worrall (yellow card) 36'; Surridge 83'; Scarpa (yellow card) 86'	Stadium: Vitality Stadium; Attendance: 10,248; Referee: Andrew Madley

4 February 2023 21	Brighton & Hove Albion	1–0	Bournemouth	Falmer
15:00 GMT	Veltman (yellow card) 9'; Dunk (yellow card) 70'; Caicedo (yellow card) 79'; Mitoma 87'	Report	Smith (yellow card) 84'	Stadium: Falmer Stadium; Attendance: 31,600; Referee: Craig Pawson

11 February 2023 22	Bournemouth	1–1	Newcastle United	Bournemouth
17:30 GMT	Senesi 30'; Smith (yellow card) 74'; Stephens (yellow card) 90+7'	Report	Almirón 45+2'; Gordon (yellow card) 60'; Botman (yellow card) 87'; Joelinton (yellow card) 90+4'	Stadium: Vitality Stadium; Attendance: 10,419; Referee: Stuart Attwell

18 February 2023 23	Wolverhampton Wanderers	0–1	Bournemouth	Wolverhampton
15:00 GMT	Aït-Nouri (yellow card) 72'; João Gomes (yellow card) 74'; Sarabia (yellow card) 86'	Report	Billing (yellow card) 29'; Tavernier 49'; Smith (yellow card) 70'; Senesi (yellow card) 74'	Stadium: Molineux Stadium; Attendance: 31,222; Referee: Michael Salisbury

25 February 2023 24	Bournemouth	1–4	Manchester City	Bournemouth
17:30 GMT	Ouattara (yellow card) 48'; Mepham (yellow card) 58'; Lerma 83'	Report	Álvarez 15'; Haaland 29'; Foden 45'; Mepham 51' (o.g.); Phillips (yellow card) 60'; Akanji (yellow card) 63'	Stadium: Vitality Stadium; Attendance: 10,481; Referee: Paul Tierney

4 March 2023 25	Arsenal	3–2	Bournemouth	Holloway
15:00 GMT	Partey 62'; White 70'; Nelson 90+7'	Report	Billing 1'; Senesi 57'; Neto (yellow card) 64'; Mepham (yellow card) 86'	Stadium: Emirates Stadium; Attendance: 60,222; Referee: Chris Kavanagh

11 March 2023 26	Bournemouth	1–0	Liverpool	Bournemouth
12:30 GMT	Billing 28', (yellow card) 46'; Anthony (yellow card) 51'	Report	Salah (penalty missed) 69'; Konaté (yellow card) 75'	Stadium: Vitality Stadium; Attendance: 10,536; Referee: John Brooks

18 March 2023 27	Aston Villa	3–0	Bournemouth	Aston
15:00 GMT	Douglas Luiz 7'; McGinn (yellow card) 36'; J. Ramsey 80'; Buendía 89'	Report	Billing (yellow card) 14'; Lerma (yellow card) 58'; Senesi (yellow card) 66'; Stephens (yellow card) 79'	Stadium: Villa Park; Attendance: 41,021; Referee: Robert Jones

1 April 2023 28	Bournemouth	2–1	Fulham	Bournemouth
15:00 BST	Tavernier 50'; Lerma (yellow card) 60'; Solanke 79'	Report	Pereira 16', (yellow card) 59'; Tete (yellow card) 67'; Cairney (yellow card) 81'; Robinson (yellow card) 90+2'	Stadium: Vitality Stadium; Attendance: 10,305; Referee: Peter Bankes

4 April 2023 29	Bournemouth	0–2	Brighton & Hove Albion	Bournemouth
19:45 BST	Cook (yellow card) 90+5'	Report	Ferguson 28'; Steele (yellow card) 60'; Enciso 90+1'	Stadium: Vitality Stadium; Attendance: 10,266; Referee: Darren Bond
Note: The match was originally scheduled for 10 September 2022, but was postponed as a mark of respect following the passing of Queen Elizabeth II.

8 April 2023 30	Leicester City	0–1	Bournemouth	Leicester
15:00 BST		Report	Rothwell (yellow card) 33'; Billing 40'; Kelly (yellow card) 79'; Smith (yellow card) 80'	Stadium: King Power Stadium; Attendance: 32,094; Referee: David Coote

15 April 2023 31	Tottenham Hotspur	2–3	Bournemouth	Tottenham
15:15 BST	Son Heung-min 14'; Perišić (yellow card) 58'; Danjuma 88'	Report	Viña 38'; Christie (yellow card) 45'; Stephens (yellow card) 45+2'; Solanke 51'; Rothwell (yellow card) 90+2'; Ouattara 90+5'	Stadium: Tottenham Hotspur Stadium; Attendance: 61,369; Referee: Andrew Madley
Note: The match was originally scheduled to be played at 15:00 BST, but was delayed by 15 minutes due to Bournemouth arriving late because of traffic.

23 April 2023 32	Bournemouth	0–4	West Ham United	Bournemouth
14:00 BST	Moore (yellow card) 48'	Report	Antonio 5'; Paquetá 12'; Rice 43'; Aguerd (yellow card) 56'; Fabiański (yellow card) 67'; Fornals 72'	Stadium: Vitality Stadium; Attendance: 10,465; Referee: Anthony Taylor

27 April 2023 33	Southampton	0–1	Bournemouth	Southampton
19:45 BST		Report	Tavernier 50'; Senesi (yellow card) 65'; Lerma (yellow card) 77'; Viña (yellow card) 86'	Stadium: St Mary's Stadium; Attendance: 30,414; Referee: Darren England

30 April 2023 34	Bournemouth	4–1	Leeds United	Bournemouth
14:00 BST	Lerma 20', 24'; Smith (yellow card) 55'; Solanke 63'; Semenyo 90+1'	Report	Bamford 32'	Stadium: Vitality Stadium; Attendance: 10,434; Referee: Chris Kavanagh

6 May 2023 35	Bournemouth	1–3	Chelsea	Bournemouth
15:00 BST	Viña 21'; Senesi (yellow card) 45+3'	Report	Gallagher 9'; Mudryk (yellow card) 15'; Kanté (yellow card) 20'; Badiashile (yellow card) 65', (goal) 82'; Félix 86'	Stadium: Vitality Stadium; Attendance: 10,357; Referee: John Brooks

13 May 2023 36	Crystal Palace	2–0	Bournemouth	Selhurst
15:00 BST	Eze 39', 58'	Report	Lerma (yellow card) 90+2'; Brooks (yellow card) 90+4'	Stadium: Selhurst Park; Attendance: 25,034; Referee: Michael Salisbury

20 May 2023 37	Bournemouth	0–1	Manchester United	Bournemouth
15:00 BST	Cook (yellow card) 70'	Report	Casemiro 9'	Stadium: Vitality Stadium; Attendance: 10,240; Referee: Chris Kavanagh

28 May 2023 38	Everton	1–0	Bournemouth	Walton
16:30 BST	Doucouré 57'; Pickford (yellow card) 74'	Report	Senesi (yellow card) 68'; Smith (yellow card) 70'; Solanke (yellow card) 70'	Stadium: Goodison Park; Attendance: 39,395; Referee: Stuart Attwell

=== FA Cup ===
The club joined the competition in the third round and were drawn at home to Burnley. They exited the competition in the third round after losing to the Championship side.

Win Draw Loss Fixtures

7 January 2023 Third round	Bournemouth	2–4	Burnley	Bournemouth
15:00 GMT	Christie 12'; Solanke 48'; Smith (yellow card) 81'	Report	Benson 6', 57'; Zaroury 39', 43'; Churlinov (yellow card) 84'; Cullen (yellow card) 89'	Stadium: Vitality Stadium; Attendance: 10,116; Referee: Tim Robinson

=== EFL Cup ===
Bournemouth entered the competition in the second round and were drawn away to Norwich City. Bournemouth were eliminated from the competition after losing to Newcastle United in the fourth round.

Win Draw Loss Fixtures

23 August 2022 Second round	Norwich City	2–2 (3–5 p)	Bournemouth	Norwich
19:45 BST	Hugill 22'; Gibbs (yellow card) 52'; Idah 83'	Report	Greenwood (yellow card) 8'; Marcondes 43'; Genesini 90+2'	Stadium: Carrow Road; Attendance: 20,647; Referee: Michael Salisbury
	Penalties
	Pukki (penalty scored); Cantwell (penalty missed); Gibbs (penalty scored); Idah (penalty scored)		(penalty scored) Marcondes; (penalty scored) Cook; (penalty scored) Anthony; (penalty scored) Saydee; (penalty scored) Christie

8 November 2022 Third round	Bournemouth	4–1	Everton	Bournemouth
19:45 GMT	Lowe 7'; Stanislas 47'; Anthony (yellow card) 73', (goal) 82'; Marcondes 78'; Pearson (yellow card) 84'; Stephens (yellow card) 85'	Report	Gordon (yellow card) 44'; Gray 67'; Mina (yellow card) 84'	Stadium: Vitality Stadium; Attendance: 10,021; Referee: Darren England

20 December 2022 Fourth round	Newcastle United	1–0	Bournemouth	Newcastle upon Tyne
19:45 GMT	Smith 67' (o.g.); Trippier (yellow card) 69'	Report	Cook (yellow card) 47'	Stadium: St James' Park; Attendance: 51,579; Referee: John Brooks

== Squad statistics ==
=== Appearances and goals ===
No.	Pos	Nat	Player	Total		Premier League		FA Cup		EFL Cup	
No.	Pos	Nat	Player	Apps	Goals	Apps	Goals	Apps	Goals	Apps	Goals
1	GK	(Republic of Ireland) IRL	Mark Travers	15	0	11+1	0	1	0	2	0
2	DF	(England) ENG	Ryan Fredericks	13	0	5+7	0	0	0	0+1	0
3	DF	(England) ENG	Jack Stephens	17	0	13+2	0	1	0	1	0
4	MF	(England) ENG	Lewis Cook	31	0	18+10	0	1	0	2	0
5	DF	(England) ENG	Lloyd Kelly	24	0	23	0	0+1	0	0	0
6	DF	(Wales) WAL	Chris Mepham	28	0	24+2	0	0	0	2	0
7	MF	(Wales) WAL	David Brooks	6	0	2+4	0	0	0	0	0
8	MF	(Colombia) COL	Jefferson Lerma	37	5	37	5	0	0	0	0
9	FW	(England) ENG	Dominic Solanke	35	7	32+1	6	1	1	1	0
10	MF	(Scotland) SCO	Ryan Christie	36	2	22+10	1	1	1	3	0
11	MF	(Burkina Faso) BFA	Dango Ouattara	19	1	15+4	1	0	0	0	0
13	GK	(Brazil) BRA	Neto	28	0	27	0	0	0	1	0
14	MF	(England) ENG	Joe Rothwell	22	0	12+8	0	1	0	1	0
15	DF	(England) ENG	Adam Smith	38	0	33+3	0	1	0	1	0
16	MF	(England) ENG	Marcus Tavernier	23	5	19+4	5	0	0	0	0
17	DF	(England) ENG	Jack Stacey	14	0	3+7	0	0+1	0	2+1	0
18	DF	(Uruguay) URU	Matías Viña	12	2	5+7	2	0	0	0	0
19	MF	(England) ENG	Junior Stanislas	5	1	0+4	0	0	0	1	1
21	FW	(Wales) WAL	Kieffer Moore	29	4	12+15	4	0+1	0	1	0
22	MF	(Ivory Coast) CIV	Hamed Traorè	7	0	5+2	0	0	0	0	0
24	FW	(Ghana) GHA	Antoine Semenyo	11	1	2+9	1	0	0	0	0
25	DF	(Argentina) ARG	Marcos Senesi	34	2	29+2	2	1	0	2	0
27	DF	(Ukraine) UKR	Illia Zabarnyi	5	0	3+2	0	0	0	0	0
29	MF	(Denmark) DEN	Philip Billing	38	7	34+2	7	1	0	1	0
32	FW	(England) ENG	Jaidon Anthony	34	4	11+19	3	1	0	3	1
33	DF	(Zimbabwe) ZIM	Jordan Zemura	22	0	17+2	0	1	0	2	0
43	DF	(Republic of Ireland) IRL	Ben Greenwood	1	0	0	0	0	0	1	0
49	MF	(England) ENG	Dominic Sadi	2	0	0	0	0	0	0+2	0
Players who left the club during the season
11	MF	(Denmark) DEN	Emiliano Marcondes	3	2	0+1	0	0	0	1+1	2
18	FW	(Jamaica) JAM	Jamal Lowe	4	1	0+2	0	0	0	1+1	1
20	MF	(Scotland) SCO	Siriki Dembélé	9	0	0+6	0	0+1	0	0+2	0
22	MF	(England) ENG	Ben Pearson	9	0	3+4	0	0	0	2	0
23	MF	(England) ENG	James Hill	2	0	0	0	0	0	1+1	0
35	MF	(Wales) WAL	Owen Bevan	2	0	0+1	0	0	0	0+1	0
38	FW	(England) ENG	Christian Saydee	1	0	0	0	0	0	1	0
44	DF	(England) ENG	Brooklyn Genesini	1	1	0	0	0	0	0+1	1
