= Brennan Camp =

Scottish footballer

Personal information
- Full name: Brennan Camp
- Date of birth: 12 October 2000 (age 26)
- Place of birth: Dorchester, England
- Height: 1.85 m (6 ft 1 in)
- Position: Defender

Team information
- Current team: Dorking Wanderers
- Number: 2

Youth career
- Portland United
- Weymouth
- 2007–2018: AFC Bournemouth

Senior career*
Years	Team	Apps	(Gls)
2018–2022	AFC Bournemouth	0	(0)
2018	→ Poole Town (loan)	0	(0)
2018–2019	→ Dorchester Town (loan)	9	(1)
2019	→ Weymouth (loan)	0	(0)
2019–2020	→ Weymouth (loan)	15	(0)
2020–2021	→ Weymouth (loan)	33	(1)
2022	→ Eastleigh (loan)	15	(1)
2022–2024	Eastleigh	27	(1)
2024–	Dorking Wanderers	76	(17)

International career
2019	Scotland U19	3	(1)
- * Club domestic league appearances and goals as of 12:39, 31 October 2026 (UTC)

Brennan Camp (born 12 October 2000) is a professional footballer who plays as a defender for Dorking Wanderers.

Born in England, he has represented Scotland at youth international level.

== Club career ==
Born in Dorchester, Camp was schooled at Royal Manor of Portland and scouted by AFC Bournemouth playing for Weymouth.

He joined Bournemouth in 2007. During the 2018–19 season, he spent time on loan at Poole Town, Dorchester Town and Weymouth. He progressed through the ranks at Bournemouth before signing his first professional contract in 2019. Camp made his debut for the club in a 6–0 defeat to Premier League side Norwich City, in the Fourth Round of the EFL Cup. He made his second appearance for the club in the FA Cup third round in a 1–3 away win at Yeovil Town. In February 2022, Camp joined National League side Eastleigh on a short-term loan deal. The loan was then extended until the end of the season. Camp was released by Bournemouth at the end of the 2021–22 season.

Following his release, Camp joined Eastleigh on a permanent basis in June 2022. In April 2023, Camp suffered an ACL rupture, keeping him out of action for the majority of the upcoming season. He departed Eastleigh at the end of the 2023–24 season.

On 16 May 2024, Camp joined National League South side Dorking Wanderers on a free transfer.

== International career ==
Camp has represented Scotland at the U19 level. He made his debut for Scotland U19s in a 1–3 away win against Turkey U19s.

== Personal life ==
Camp is the grandson of former Bristol City player Gerry Gow.

== Career statistics ==
As of match played 27 October 2026

Appearances and goals by club, season and competition
Club	Season	League			FA Cup		EFL Cup		Other		Total	
Club	Season	Division	Apps	Goals	Apps	Goals	Apps	Goals	Apps	Goals	Apps	Goals
AFC Bournemouth	2018–19	Premier League	0	0	0	0	0	0	—		0	0
AFC Bournemouth	2019–20	Premier League	0	0	0	0	0	0	—		0	0
AFC Bournemouth	2020–21	Premier League	0	0	0	0	0	0	—		0	0
AFC Bournemouth	2021–22	Premier League	0	0	1	0	1	0	—		2	0
AFC Bournemouth	Total		0	0	1	0	1	0	—		2	0
Poole Town (loan)	2018–19	Southern League Premier Division South	0	0	—		—		1 (Note: Appearance in the Southern League Cup)	0	1	0
Dorchester Town (loan)	2018–19	Southern League Premier Division South	9	1	—		—		1 (Note: Appearance in the FA Trophy)	0	10	1
Weymouth (loan)	2018–19	Southern League Premier Division South	0	0	—		—		1 (Note: Appearance in the Southern League champions play-off)	0	1	0
Weymouth (loan)	2019–20	National League South	15	0	—		—		4 (Note: Two appearances in the FA Trophy, two in the National League South play-offs)	0	19	0
Weymouth (loan)	2020–21	National League	33	1	1	0	—		0	0	34	1
Weymouth (loan)	Total		48	1	1	0	—		5	0	54	1
Eastleigh (loan)	2021–22	National League	15	1	—		—		—		15	1
Eastleigh	2022–23	National League	27	1	2	0	—		1	0	30	1
Eastleigh	2023–24	National League	0	0	0	0	—		0	0	0	0
Eastleigh	Total		27	1	2	0	—		1	0	30	1
Dorking Wanderers	2024–25	National League South	28	7	0	0	—		2 (Note: One appearance in the FA Trophy, one in the National League South play-offs)	0	30	7
Dorking Wanderers	2025–26	National League South	37	9	3	1	—		4 (Note: Two appearances in the FA Trophy, two in the National League South play-offs)	0	44	10
Dorking Wanderers	2026–27	National League South	11	1	3	0	—		0	0	14	1
Dorking Wanderers	Total		76	17	6	1	—		6	0	88	18
Career total			175	21	10	1	1	0	14	0	200	22

== Honours ==
Individual

- National League South Team of the Season: 2025–26
