= Dominic Solanke =

English footballer (born 1997)

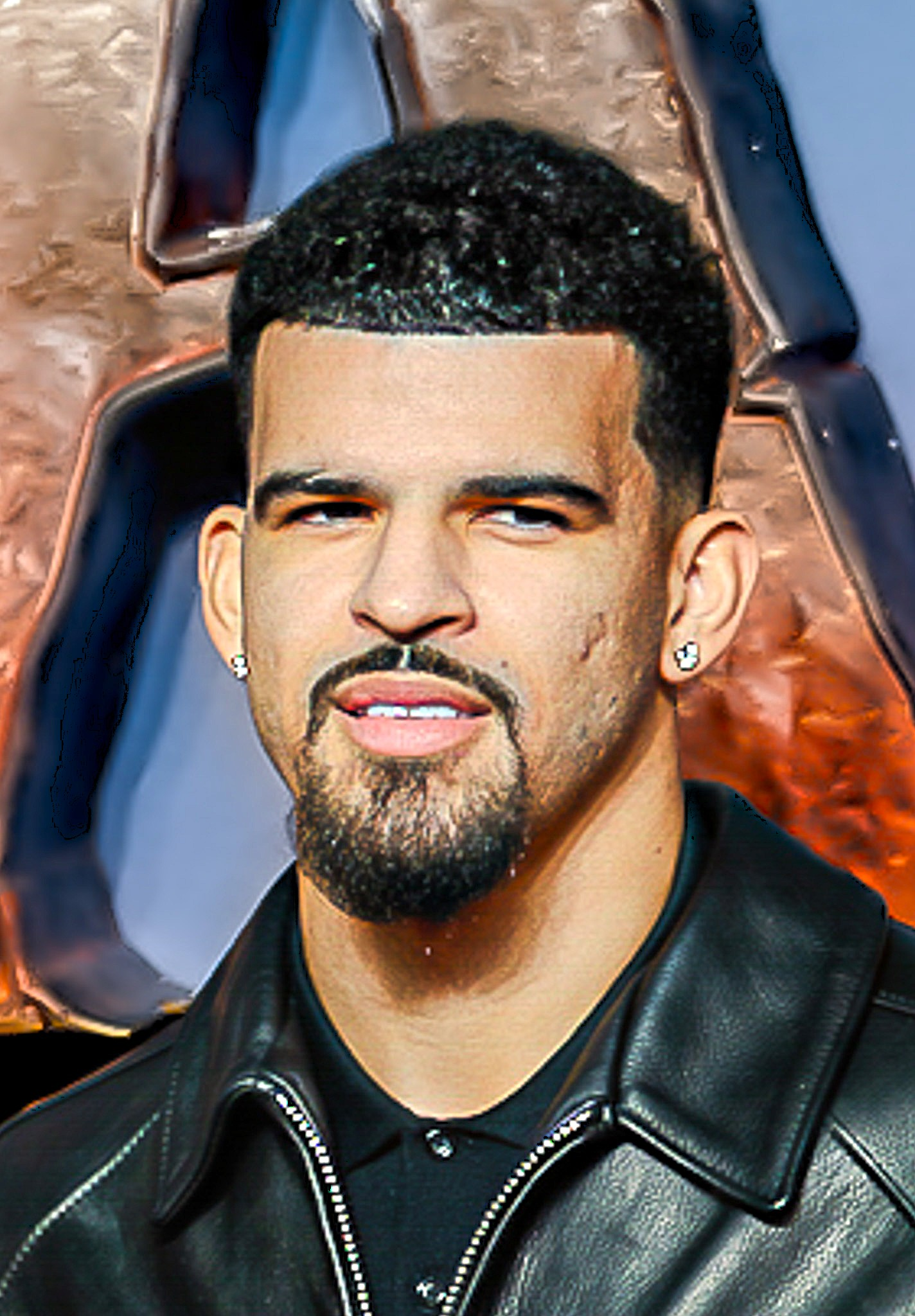
- Solanke in 2025

Personal information
- Full name: Dominic Ayodele Solanke-Mitchell
- Date of birth: 14 September 1997 (age 29)
- Place of birth: Reading, England
- Height: 6 ft 2 in (1.87 m)
- Position: Striker

Team information
- Current team: Tottenham Hotspur
- Number: 19

Youth career
- 2004–2014: Chelsea

Senior career*
Years	Team	Apps	(Gls)
2014–2017	Chelsea	0	(0)
2015–2016	→ Vitesse (loan)	25	(7)
2017–2019	Liverpool	21	(1)
2019–2024	Bournemouth	199	(72)
2024–	Tottenham Hotspur	53	(14)

International career^{‡}
2012–2013	England U16	16	(10)
2013–2014	England U17	14	(11)
2014–2015	England U18	17	(12)
2015–2016	England U19	10	(8)
2016–2017	England U20	15	(10)
2015–2019	England U21	18	(9)
2017–	England	5	(0)
Medal record
Men's football
Representing England
FIFA U-20 World Cup
Winner	2017
UEFA European Under-17 Championship
Winner	2014
- * Club domestic league appearances and goals as of 23:28, 21 November 2026 (UTC) ‡ National team caps and goals as of 23:25, 31 March 2026 (UTC)

Dominic Ayodele Solanke-Mitchell (born 14 September 1997) is an English professional footballer who plays as a striker for Premier League club Tottenham Hotspur and the England national team.

Solanke started his career with Chelsea, making his first-team debut in October 2014. He spent the 2015–16 season on loan with Vitesse in the Eredivisie. He signed for Liverpool in July 2017, making 27 appearances before joining Bournemouth in January 2019. He signed for Tottenham Hotspur in August 2024. In 2025, Solanke was part of the Tottenham Hotspur team who won the Europa League, their first trophy in 17 years.

Solanke has represented England at all youth, under-21 and senior levels. He has won the 2014 UEFA European Under-17 Championship and the 2017 FIFA U-20 World Cup with his country and received the Golden Ball award for best player in the latter tournament.

== Early life ==
Solanke was born in Reading, Berkshire, to a Nigerian Yoruba father and an English mother. He attended Brighton Hill Community School in Basingstoke.

== Club career ==
=== Chelsea ===
==== Early career ====
Solanke started his career with Chelsea in 2004 in their under-eight team. During the 2013–14 season, Solanke scored 20 goals in 25 appearances for the under-18 team. On 6 May 2014, he scored two late goals as Chelsea came from two goals down to beat local rivals Fulham 7–6 on aggregate in the FA Youth Cup Final. On 29 July 2014, José Mourinho stated a belief that he should blame himself were Solanke not to become a senior England international under his management, and indicated that the player would train with the first-team squad during the 2014–15 season.

==== 2014–15 season ====
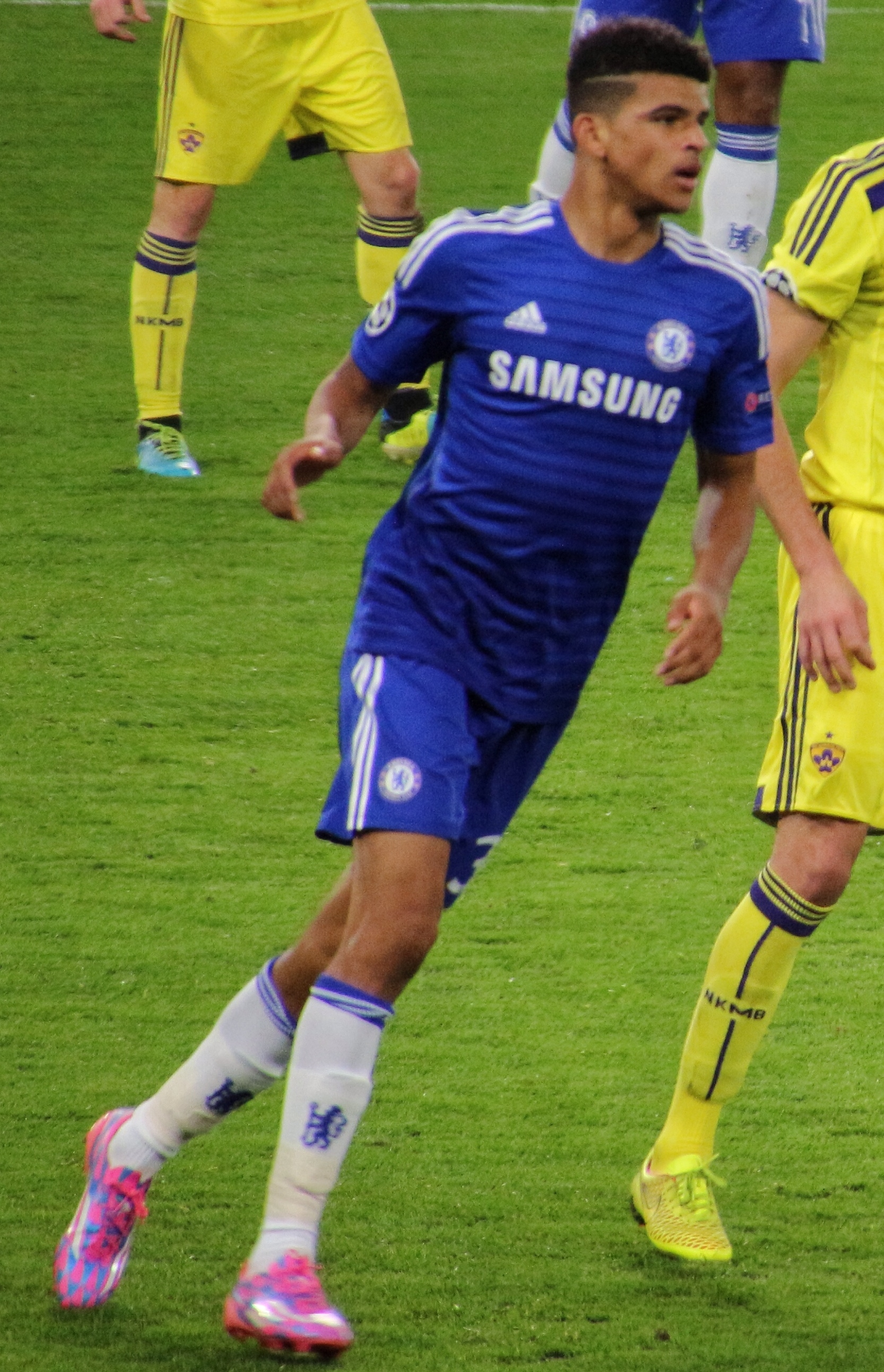
Solanke playing for Chelsea in 2014

Solanke signed his first professional contract with Chelsea in September 2014. Due to the injury of Diego Costa, Solanke was named on the bench for a Premier League match against Crystal Palace on 18 October 2014. Three days later, he made his first-team debut as a substitute for Oscar in the 73rd minute of a 6–0 win over NK Maribor in the UEFA Champions League. This made him the youngest player to debut in the UEFA Champions League for Chelsea, later eclipsed by Reggie Walsh in October 2025.

He finished as top scorer in the group stages of the UEFA Youth League after scoring a hat-trick in the final group stage match against Sporting CP. On 10 April 2015, Solanke scored two goals in the semi-final of the 2014–15 UEFA Youth League against Roma to send Chelsea into the final. He scored in the 3–2 win over Shakhtar Donetsk in the UEFA Youth League final, ending the tournament with 12 goals in nine appearances as Chelsea won the title. On 20 April 2015, Solanke scored a late goal to give the team side a 3–1 win in the first leg of the FA Youth Cup final against Manchester City. He played in the 2–1 win in the second leg, as Chelsea won the final 5–2 on aggregate. On 7 May 2015, Solanke reached 41 goals for the season after scoring a hat-trick in a 4–3 victory over Liverpool U21. He was awarded the inaugural Chelsea Academy Player of the Year award for the 2014–15 season.

==== 2015–16 season: Loan to Vitesse ====
On 4 August 2015, Solanke joined Eredivisie club Vitesse on a season-long loan to gain first-team experience. After getting approval from FIFA to play in the Netherlands, he made his debut on 23 August 2015, coming off the bench in the 79th minute against Feyenoord, the match ending in a 2–0 defeat for Vitesse. A week later, Solanke scored his first goal in a 4–1 victory over Cambuur after coming off the bench with 15 minutes to go. He ended the season with seven goals in 25 appearances, just three behind top scorer Valeri Qazaishvili and one behind runner-up Milot Rashica.

==== 2016–17 season ====
After rejecting many loan offers from several clubs, Solanke was retained as Chelsea's third-choice striker behind Diego Costa and Michy Batshuayi for the first half of the 2016–17 season. On 23 August 2016, he was involved in Chelsea's matchday squad for the first time since returning from his loan at Vitesse, for their EFL Cup home tie against Bristol Rovers. He remained as an unused substitute in Chelsea's 3–2 victory. In February 2017, Chelsea manager Antonio Conte confirmed that it was likely that Solanke would leave the club in the summer upon the expiry of his contract.

=== Liverpool ===
On 30 May 2017, Solanke agreed to sign for Premier League club Liverpool on 1 July upon the expiration of his Chelsea contract. He was officially confirmed as a Liverpool player on 10 July 2017, with Liverpool expected to pay a tribunal-set fee of around £3 million. He made his debut for the club on 16 August 2017, coming on as a substitute for Roberto Firmino in a 2–1 UEFA Champions League first-leg win over TSG Hoffenheim. His first Premier League start for Liverpool came on 30 November in a 3–0 win over Stoke City at the Bet365 Stadium. He scored his first and only Liverpool goal on 13 May 2018, the final day of the 2017–18 season, in the 4–0 home victory against Brighton & Hove Albion.

=== Bournemouth ===
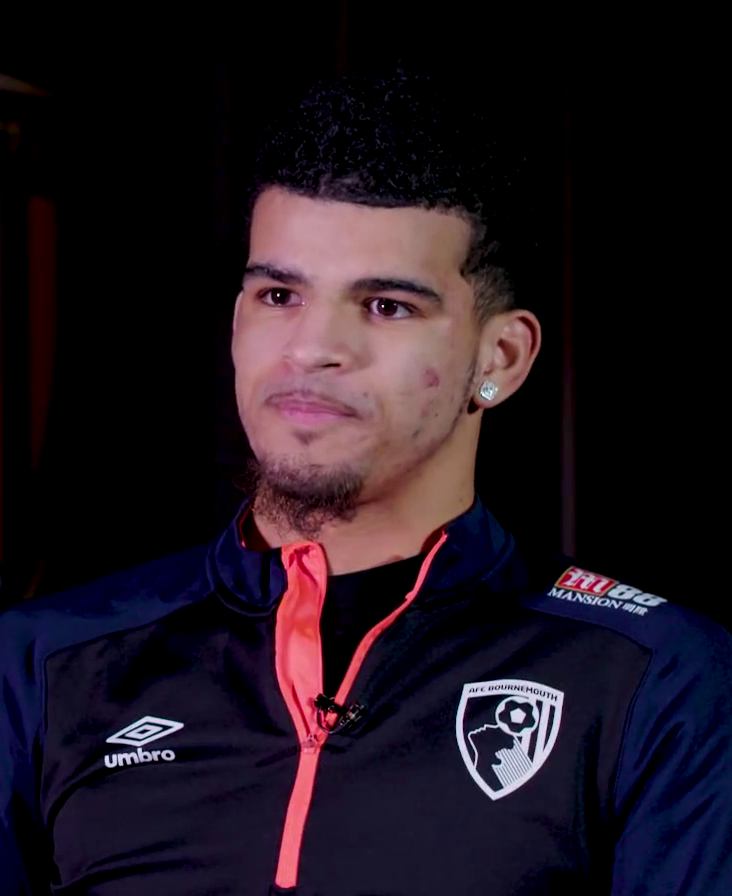
Solanke in 2019

Solanke signed for fellow Premier League club Bournemouth on 4 January 2019 on a long-term contract for an undisclosed fee, reported by BBC Sport as £19 million. He made his debut on 2 February in a 2–0 away loss against Cardiff City in the league.

Solanke scored his first and second Premier League goals for Bournemouth on his 39th league appearance on 12 July 2020, a 4–1 win over Leicester City. He then scored in Bournemouth's 3–1 victory at Everton on the final day of the 2019–20 Premier League season but it was not enough to save the club from relegation to the EFL Championship.

Solanke scored fifteen goals during the 2020–21 season, finishing as the club's joint top goal scorer in the Championship along with Arnaut Danjuma. The following season, Solanke scored 29 goals as Bournemouth were promoted back to the Premier League, finishing as runner-up in the Championship.

On Bournemouth's return to the Premier League during the 2022–23 season, Solanke scored six goals and finished as the club's top assister in the league with seven assists. On 14 September 2023, he signed a new contract until 2027.

On 23 December 2023, Solanke scored his first senior hat-trick in a 3–2 win over Nottingham Forest. On 12 January 2024, after Solanke scored six goals in seven matches in December, he won the Premier League Player of the Month award for that month. Solanke thus became the first Bournemouth player to win the award. In the 2023–24 season, he set a new personal record in the Premier League with 19 goals.

=== Tottenham Hotspur ===
On 10 August 2024, Tottenham Hotspur announced the signing of Solanke on a six-year contract, which was a club-record departure for Bournemouth, as well as a potential club-record arrival for Spurs at a reported fee of £55 million, with a further £10 million possible in bonuses. On 19 August, he made his debut for the club in a 1–1 draw against Leicester City in the league. On 21 September 2024, Solanke scored his first goal for Spurs in a 3–1 home win over Brentford. On 26 September, Solanke scored his first career goal in any UEFA club competition in a 3–0 home win over Qarabağ in the UEFA Europa League group stage.

On 8 May 2025, Solanke scored his 100th career goal in Spurs' 2–0 away win against Bodø/Glimt in the second leg of the Europa League semi-final. He scored his first goal of the 2025–26 season in a 2–0 win against Borussia Dortmund in the UEFA Champions League.

== International career ==
Solanke has represented England at all youth levels. In May 2014, Solanke was part of the under-17 team that won the 2014 UEFA European Under-17 Championship. He was the tournament's joint top scorer with four goals in four appearances, a brace against Turkey, a goal in the semi-final secured a place in the final, and England's goal in the final.

In January 2015, Solanke was named the England Men's Youth Player of the Year for 2014. In March 2015, Solanke collected his trophy and was invited to train with the senior England squad. He was named in the under-19 squad for the 2016 UEFA European Under-19 Championship.

Solanke was named in the under-20 squad for the 2017 FIFA U-20 World Cup. He scored four goals in the tournament; in the quarter-final, he scored the only goal against Mexico as England advanced into the semi-final, and scored twice in the semi-final as England beat Italy 3–1 to reach the final. Solanke started as England beat Venezuela 1–0 in the final. Solanke was awarded the Golden Ball as the player of the tournament.

Solanke was called up by the senior team for the first time in November 2017 for a friendly against Brazil at Wembley. He came on as a 75th-minute substitute in a 0–0 draw.

On 27 May 2019, Solanke was included in England's 23-man squad for the 2019 UEFA European Under-21 Championship.

Due to his impressive form in the 2023–24 season, there were calls for Solanke to be included in England's squad for UEFA Euro 2024, but Gareth Southgate did not include him in the final 26-man squad. Solanke later said: "The Euros were definitely something I was pushing for, but there are so many players that can represent England – we're probably one of the strongest in the world, so it's not easy to get picked."

In October 2024, Solanke was recalled after a seven-year absence from the international stage and made his second appearance for the senior team when he came on as a 72nd-minute substitute in a 2–1 loss against Greece.

== Style of play ==
Solanke primarily plays as a striker, although can also operate as either an attacking midfielder or a winger. Former Chelsea striker Tore André Flo has said that Solanke "works really hard", has "got very good physique" and "a great touch on the ball". He went on to say: "He's quick but often what impresses me the most is when he looks like he's lost the ball, he somehow manages to get out with the ball, no matter how tight the situation is or how difficult it looks".

== Personal life ==
Outside of football, Solanke is a fan of anime and manga. During his time at Bournemouth and Tottenham, Solanke used celebrations based on various anime series, including Naruto, Attack on Titan, Jujutsu Kaisen, One Piece and Demon Slayer.

Shortly after signing a contract with Bournemouth in 2023, Solanke revealed that he had become a father. Solanke got engaged to Erica Raimondi in November 2022, with the couple getting married on 17 June 2025. Solanke is a practicing born-again Christian; he was baptised a week before turning 28 years old.

== Career statistics ==
=== Club ===
As of match played 21 November 2026

Appearances and goals by club, season and competition
Club	Season	League			National cup (Note: Includes KNVB Cup, FA Cup)		League cup (Note: Includes EFL Cup)		Europe		Other		Total	
Club	Season	Division	Apps	Goals	Apps	Goals	Apps	Goals	Apps	Goals	Apps	Goals	Apps	Goals
Chelsea	2014–15	Premier League	0	0	0	0	0	0	1 (Note: Appearance(s) in UEFA Champions League)	0	—		1	0
Chelsea	2016–17	Premier League	0	0	0	0	0	0	—		—		0	0
Chelsea	Total		0	0	0	0	0	0	1	0	—		1	0
Vitesse (loan)	2015–16	Eredivisie	25	7	1	0	—		—		—		26	7
Liverpool	2017–18	Premier League	21	1	1	0	1	0	4	0	—		27	1
Liverpool	2018–19	Premier League	0	0	—		0	0	0	0	—		0	0
Liverpool	Total		21	1	1	0	1	0	4	0	—		27	1
Bournemouth	2018–19	Premier League	10	0	0	0	—		—		—		10	0
Bournemouth	2019–20	Premier League	32	3	2	1	2	0	—		—		36	4
Bournemouth	2020–21	Championship	40	15	2	0	1	0	—		2 (Note: Appearances in Championship play-offs)	0	45	15
Bournemouth	2021–22	Championship	46	29	1	0	1	1	—		—		48	30
Bournemouth	2022–23	Premier League	33	6	1	1	1	0	—		—		35	7
Bournemouth	2023–24	Premier League	38	19	1	1	3	1	—		—		42	21
Bournemouth	Total		199	72	7	3	8	2	—		2	0	216	77
Tottenham Hotspur	2024–25	Premier League	27	9	1	0	4	2	13 (Note: Appearances in UEFA Europa League)	5	—		45	16
Tottenham Hotspur	2025–26	Premier League	15	3	1	0	0	0	3	3	1 (Note: Appearance in UEFA Super Cup)	0	20	6
Tottenham Hotspur	2026–27	Premier League	11	2	0	0	2	1	—		—		13	3
Tottenham Hotspur	Total		53	14	2	0	6	3	16	8	1	0	78	25
Career total			298	94	11	3	15	5	21	8	3	0	348	110

=== International ===
As of match played 31 March 2026

Appearances and goals by national team and year
National team	Year	Apps	Goals
England	2017	1	0
England	2024	2	0
England	2026	2	0
Total		5	0

== Honours ==
Chelsea Youth

- FA Youth Cup: 2013–14, 2014–15
- UEFA Youth League: 2014–15

Liverpool

- UEFA Champions League runner-up: 2017–18

Tottenham Hotspur

- UEFA Europa League: 2024–25

England U17

- UEFA European Under-17 Championship: 2014

England U20

- FIFA U-20 World Cup: 2017

Individual

- UEFA European Under-17 Championship Team of the Tournament: 2014
- UEFA European Under-17 Championship top goalscorers: 2014
- UEFA Youth League top goalscorer: 2014–15
- Chelsea Academy Player of the Year: 2014–15
- England Men's Youth Player of the Year: 2014
- FIFA U-20 World Cup Golden Ball: 2017
- EFL Championship Team of the Season: 2021–22
- PFA Team of the Year: 2021–22 Championship
- Premier League Player of the Month: December 2023
- Premier League Goal of the Month: February 2026
- UEFA Europa League Team of the Season: 2024–25
