= Mark Travers =

Irish footballer (born 1999)

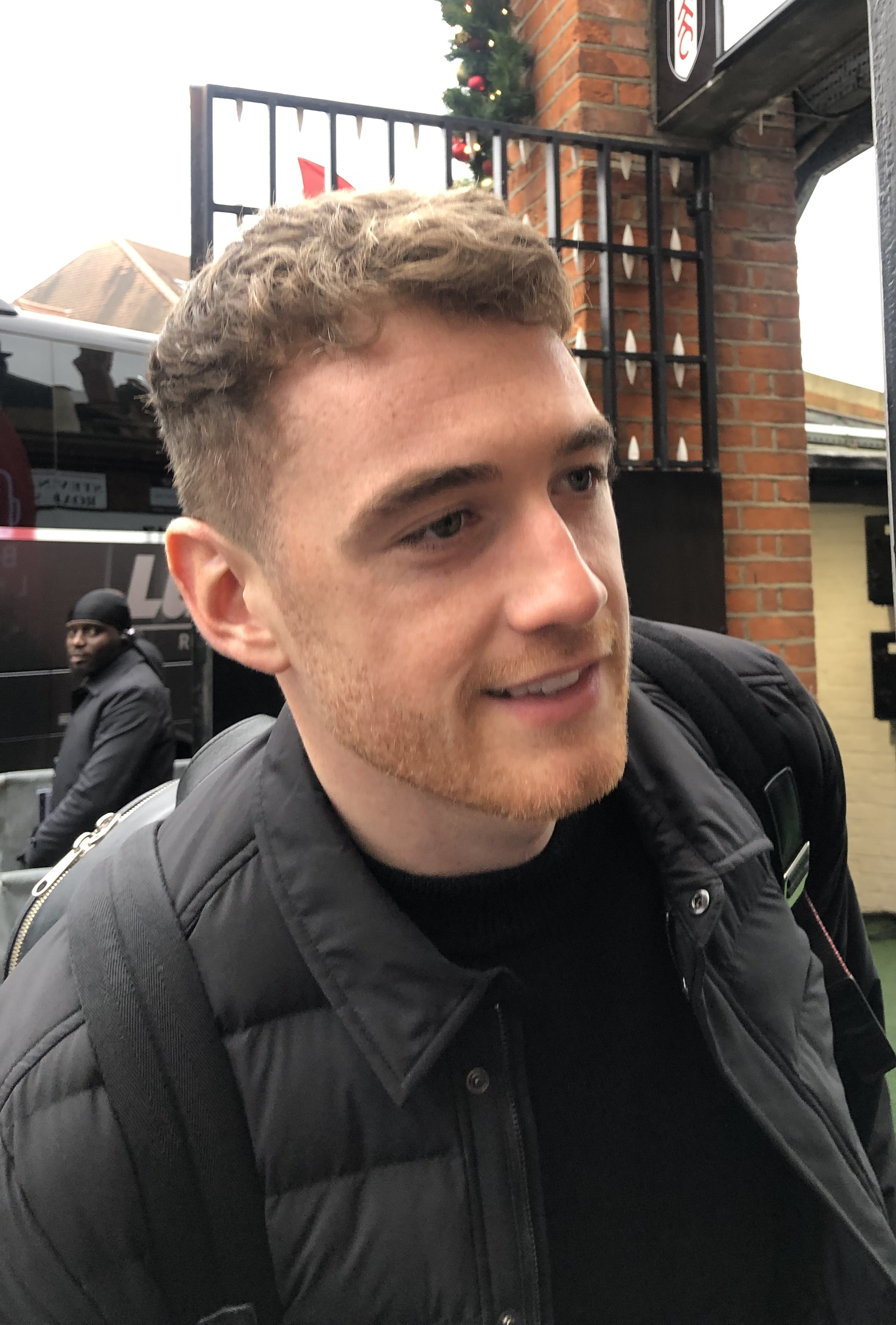
- Travers in 2024.

Personal information
- Full name: Mark John Travers
- Date of birth: 18 May 1999 (age 27)
- Place of birth: Maynooth, Ireland
- Height: 1.91 m (6 ft 3 in)
- Position: Goalkeeper

Team information
- Current team: Everton
- Number: 12

Youth career
- Confey
- Lucan United
- 2014–2015: Cherry Orchard
- 2015–2016: Shamrock Rovers
- 2016–2017: AFC Bournemouth

Senior career*
Years	Team	Apps	(Gls)
2017–2025	AFC Bournemouth	70	(0)
2017–2018	→ Weymouth (loan)	23	(1)
2021	→ Swindon Town (loan)	8	(0)
2023	→ Stoke City (loan)	13	(0)
2025	→ Middlesbrough (loan)	17	(0)
2025–	Everton	0	(0)

International career^{‡}
- Republic of Ireland U15
- Republic of Ireland U16
- Republic of Ireland U17
- Republic of Ireland U18
- Republic of Ireland U19
- Republic of Ireland U21
2019–	Republic of Ireland	6	(0)
- * Club domestic league appearances and goals as of 14:42, 4 May 2025 (UTC) ‡ National team caps and goals as of 22:46, 5 June 2026 (UTC)

Mark John Travers (born 18 May 1999) is an Irish professional footballer who plays as a goalkeeper for Premier League club Everton and the Republic of Ireland national team.

He has represented the Republic of Ireland at youth international level up until under-21 level as well as the Republic of Ireland senior team, earning his first cap in September 2019.

== Club career ==
=== Early career ===
Travers' first youth club was Confey in Leixlip, he then moved on to Lucan United, before spending a season at Cherry Orchard and 6 months at Shamrock Rovers.

=== AFC Bournemouth ===
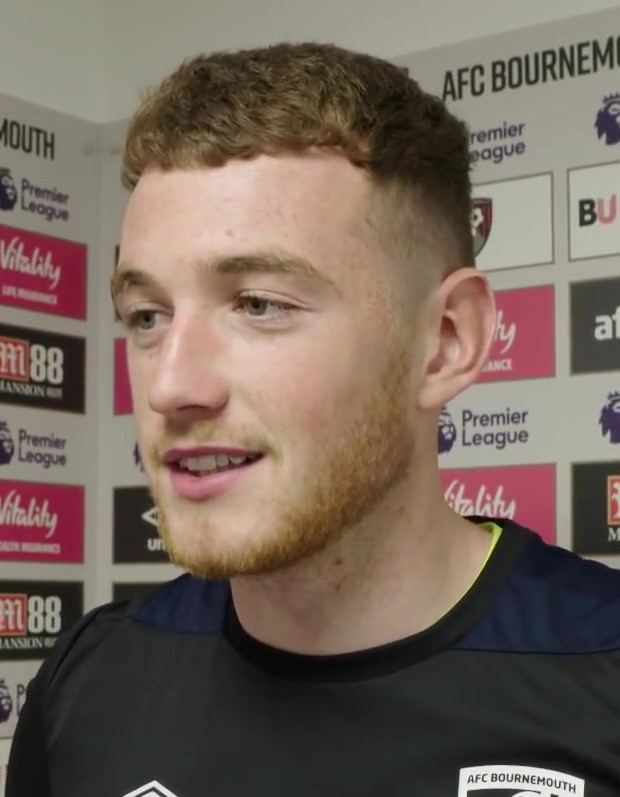
Travers with AFC Bournemouth in 2019.

Travers signed for English club AFC Bournemouth in July 2016, aged 17. He joined Weymouth on loan in August 2017, scoring on his debut in the 3–2 victory against Bishop's Stortford. The loan ended in January 2018.

In July 2018 he signed a new "long-term" contract with Bournemouth.

He made his debut for Bournemouth on 4 May 2019 in a 1–0 win over Tottenham Hotspur. Upon doing so, he became the first teenage goalkeeper since Joe Hart in 2006 to start a Premier League match, and made a number of saves to help the club record its first ever victory over Tottenham, with Travers keeping a clean sheet and receiving Man of the Match for his performance. He was later selected by BBC pundit Garth Crooks in his 'Team of the Week'.

On 15 July 2019, Travers signed a new long-term contract at Bournemouth.

He moved on loan to Swindon Town in January 2021. He was recalled by Bournemouth on 11 February 2021, having made eight appearances.

Following the departure of Asmir Begović, Travers began the 2021–22 season as Bournemouth's first choice goalkeeper, beginning with a 2–2 draw with West Brom on the opening day of the campaign. Travers started all but one of the Cherries' opening 14 games, an unbeaten run which included a club record-setting six away games in a row without conceding a goal. For his performances in September 2021, Travers was nominated for the club's player of the month award, losing out to Gary Cahill. In June 2022 he signed a new five-year contract with Bournemouth.

Travers joined Stoke City on loan for the 2023–24 season. He made 14 appearances for Stoke before he was recalled by Bournemouth on 27 October 2023 after an injury sustained by Neto.

On 29 January 2025, Travers signed on loan for Middlesbrough until the end of the 2024–25 season.

=== Everton ===
On 15 July 2025, Travers signed for Premier League club Everton on a four-year deal.

He made his Everton debut on 27 August 2025 during the 2–0 win against Mansfield Town in the EFL Cup second round.

== International career ==
Travers has played for Ireland from under-15 to under-19 youth levels, and whilst a member of the under-21 team received his first call-up to the senior national team in March 2019. He was called up again to the Republic of Ireland national football team senior squad in May 2019, for Ireland's 2020 European Qualifiers against Denmark and Gibraltar.

Travers made his senior international debut on 10 September 2019, starting in a 3–1 win over Bulgaria at the Aviva Stadium.

== Career statistics ==
=== Club ===
As of match played 23 September 2025

Appearances and goals by club, season and competition
Club	Season	League			FA Cup		EFL Cup		Other		Total	
Club	Season	Division	Apps	Goals	Apps	Goals	Apps	Goals	Apps	Goals	Apps	Goals
AFC Bournemouth	2017–18	Premier League	0	0	0	0	0	0	—		0	0
AFC Bournemouth	2018–19	Premier League	2	0	0	0	0	0	—		2	0
AFC Bournemouth	2019–20	Premier League	1	0	2	0	2	0	—		5	0
AFC Bournemouth	2020–21	Championship	1	0	0	0	1	0	—		2	0
AFC Bournemouth	2021–22	Championship	45	0	0	0	1	0	—		46	0
AFC Bournemouth	2022–23	Premier League	12	0	1	0	2	0	—		15	0
AFC Bournemouth	2023–24	Premier League	4	0	3	0	0	0	—		7	0
AFC Bournemouth	2024–25	Premier League	5	0	0	0	0	0	—		5	0
AFC Bournemouth	Total		70	0	6	0	6	0	0	0	82	0
Weymouth (loan)	2017–18	Southern League Premier Division	23	1	2	0	—		1 (Note: Appearance(s) in FA Trophy)	0	26	1
Swindon Town (loan)	2020–21	League One	8	0	0	0	—		—		8	0
Stoke City (loan)	2023–24	Championship	13	0	—		1	0	—		14	0
Middlesbrough (loan)	2024–25	Championship	17	0	—		—		—		17	0
Everton	2025–26	Premier League	0	0	0	0	2	0	—		2	0
Everton	2026–27	Premier League	0	0	0	0	0	0	—		0	0
Everton	Total		0	0	0	0	2	0	0	0	2	0
Career total			131	1	8	0	9	0	1	0	149	1

=== International ===
As of match played 5 June 2026

Appearances and goals by national team and year
National team	Year	Apps	Goals
Republic of Ireland	2019	2	0
Republic of Ireland	2020	0	0
Republic of Ireland	2021	1	0
Republic of Ireland	2022	0	0
Republic of Ireland	2023	1	0
Republic of Ireland	2026	2	0
Total		6	0

== Honours ==
AFC Bournemouth

- EFL Championship runner-up: 2021–22

Individual

- EFL Championship Golden Glove: 2021–22
- AFC Bournemouth Player of the Year: 2021–22
