= Jordan Zemura =

Zimbabwean footballer (born 1999)

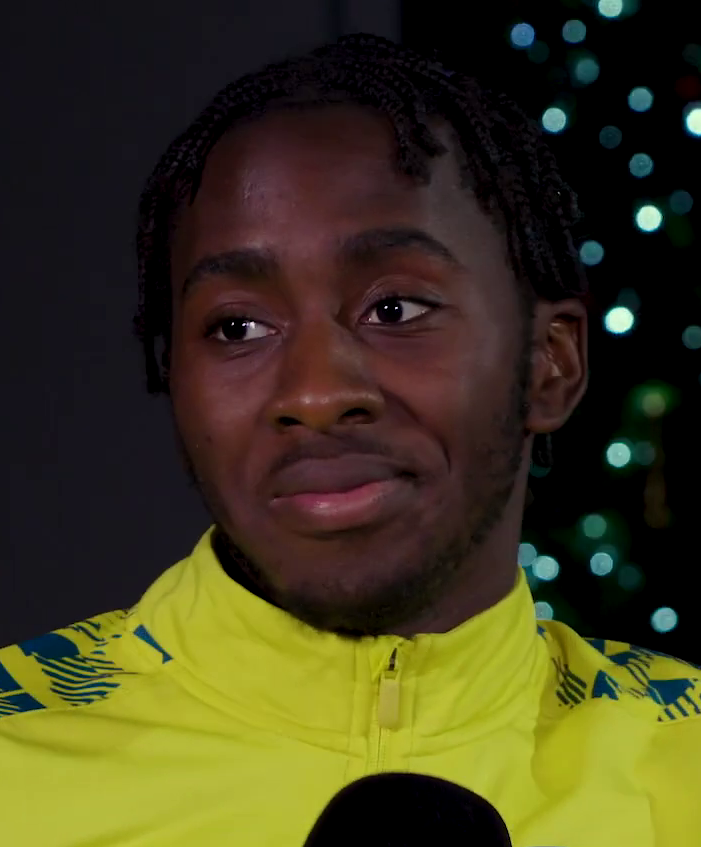
- Zemura in 2020

Personal information
- Full name: Jordan Bhekithemba Zemura
- Date of birth: 14 November 1999 (age 27)
- Place of birth: Lambeth, England
- Height: 1.73 m (5 ft 8 in)
- Position: Left-back

Team information
- Current team: Watford (on loan from Udinese)
- Number: 33

Youth career
- 2006–2011: Queens Park Rangers
- 2011–2019: Charlton Athletic
- 2019–2020: AFC Bournemouth

Senior career*
Years	Team	Apps	(Gls)
2020–2023	AFC Bournemouth	54	(3)
2023–	Udinese	67	(2)
2026–	→ Watford (loan)	10	(1)

International career^{‡}
2020–	Zimbabwe	22	(0)
- * Club domestic league appearances and goals as of 17 October 2026 ‡ National team caps and goals as of 20:25, 26 May 2026 (UTC)

Jordan Bhekithemba Zemura (born 14 November 1999) is a professional footballer who plays as a left-back for EFL Championship club Watford, on loan from Serie A club Udinese. Born in England, he plays for the Zimbabwe national team.

== Early life ==
Zemura went to the Oasis Academy Isle of Sheppey for secondary school and went on to study Sport Science at Canterbury Christ Church University. He has also represented his country at athletics.

== Club career ==
=== Early career ===
Zemura joined Queens Park Rangers' academy at the age of six, spending three years there. He had a brief trial with Chelsea, before moving to Charlton Athletic, where he spent eight years in their youth setup.

=== AFC Bournemouth ===
Zemura was signed by Bournemouth following a successful trial period in 2019. He made his debut for Bournemouth on 15 September 2020 in an EFL Cup tie against Crystal Palace at the Vitality Stadium, which Bournemouth won 11–10 on penalties after regulation time ended in a goalless draw; Zemura scored his penalty in the shootout.

==== First team breakthrough ====
Zemura started in Bournemouth's opening fixture against West Brom, his first league start for the club, with the game finishing 2–2. An impressive start to the 2021–22 season saw Zemura win the club's Player of the Month award for August, starting all five league games in an unbeaten opening to the season for the Cherries. Zemura scored his first two professional goals on 11 September 2021, netting a brace in a 3–0 win over Barnsley.

=== Udinese ===
On 12 April 2023, Serie A side Udinese officially announced that Zemura would join the club on a free transfer at the start of the 2023–24 season, signing a four-year deal in the process.

==== Watford (loan) ====
On 2 August 2026, Zemura joined Watford on a season-long loan.

== International career ==
Despite being born in London, Zemura represents Zimbabwe on the international stage as he holds Zimbabwean citizenship. Both of his parents were born in Zimbabwe, his father in Murehwa and his mother in Wedza.

He was called up to the Zimbabwe squad for the 2021 AFCON Qualifiers against Zambia and Botswana in November 2019 but was forced to withdraw due to an expired passport. He debuted for the Zimbabwe national team in a 3–1 2021 Africa Cup of Nations qualification loss to Algeria on 13 November 2020.

Zemura was named in the Zimbabwe squad for the 2021 Africa Cup of Nations.

== Career statistics ==
=== Club ===
As of match played 7 November 2026

Appearances and goals by club, season and competition
Club	Season	League			National cup (Note: Includes FA Cup, Coppa Italia)		League cup (Note: Includes EFL Cup)		Total	
Club	Season	Division	Apps	Goals	Apps	Goals	Apps	Goals	Apps	Goals
AFC Bournemouth	2020–21	Championship	2	0	1	0	2	0	5	0
AFC Bournemouth	2021–22	Championship	33	3	0	0	1	0	34	3
AFC Bournemouth	2022–23	Premier League	19	0	1	0	2	0	22	0
AFC Bournemouth	Total		54	3	2	0	5	0	61	3
Udinese	2023–24	Serie A	27	1	2	0	—		29	1
Udinese	2024–25	Serie A	23	1	2	0	—		25	1
Udinese	2025–26	Serie A	9	0	2	0	—		11	0
Udinese	Total		59	2	6	0	—		65	2
Watford (loan)	2026–27	Championship	13	1	0	0	—		13	1
Career total			126	6	8	0	5	0	139	6

=== International ===
As of match played 26 May 2026

Appearances and goals by national team and year
National team	Year	Apps	Goals
Zimbabwe	2020	2	0
Zimbabwe	2021	2	0
Zimbabwe	2022	2	0
Zimbabwe	2023	1	0
Zimbabwe	2024	9	0
Zimbabwe	2025	6	0
Zimbabwe	2026	1	0
Total		23	0

== Honours ==
AFC Bournemouth

- Championship runner-up: 2021–22

Zimbabwe

- Unity Cup third place: 2026
