= Owen Bevan =

Welsh footballer (born 2003)

Personal information
- Full name: Owen Lucas Bevan
- Date of birth: 26 October 2003 (age 23)
- Place of birth: Winchester, England
- Position: Centre-back

Team information
- Current team: Dundee
- Number: 5

Youth career
- 2013–2022: Bournemouth

Senior career*
Years	Team	Apps	(Gls)
2022–2026	Bournemouth	1	(0)
2022	→ Truro City (loan)	19	(1)
2022–2023	→ Yeovil Town (loan)	31	(1)
2023–2024	→ Cheltenham Town (loan)	13	(0)
2024	→ Hibernian (loan)	0	(0)
2026–	Dundee	12	(2)

International career^{‡}
2019	Wales U17	2	(0)
2021	Wales U19	3	(0)
2022–2023	Wales U21	5	(0)
- * Club domestic league appearances and goals as of 21:47, 21 November 2026 (UTC) ‡ National team caps and goals as of 12:18, 20 November 2023 (UTC)

Owen Lucas Bevan (born 26 October 2003) is a professional footballer who plays as centre-back for Scottish Premiership club Dundee. Born in England, he is a former Wales under-21 international.

== Personal life ==
Born in Winchester, and raised in Fair Oak, Hampshire Bevan qualifies for Wales through his mother, Katie. His father, Lester Bevan, is a boxing coach. Owen's brother Taylor Bevan is a Welsh former amateur boxing champion who represented Wales at the 2022 Commonwealth Games, winning the silver medal in the men's light heavyweight event.

== Club career ==
Bevan joined the youth academy at Bournemouth when he was nine years old. He did play as a central midfielder but moved to defence aged 14. He was appointed as the captain of Bournemouth under-18s for the 2021–22 season. He joined Truro City on loan in January 2022. Having initially signed a professional contract for the first time in March 2021, Bevan was offered a new contact with Bournemouth in May 2022.

Bevan was given the number 35 shirt ahead of the 2022–23 season, and featured for the Bournemouth first team for the first time during a pre-season friendly against Real Sociedad. On 23 August 2022, Bevan made his professional debut for AFC Bournemouth during a win on penalties over Norwich City in the League Cup.

On 2 September 2022, Bevan joined National League side Yeovil Town on loan until the end of the 2022–23 season.

On 25 August 2023, Bevan joined League One club Cheltenham Town on a season-long loan deal. On 2 January 2024, Bevan returned to his parent club AFC Bournemouth due to injury.

On 1 February 2024, Bevan joined Scottish Premiership side Hibernian on loan until the end of the 2023–24 season. Due to a setback in rehabilitation from injury, Bevan was unable to play for Hibs and he returned to Bournemouth for treatment.

On 10 July 2026 after impressing while on trial, Bevan left Bournemouth to join Scottish Premiership club Dundee on a two-year deal with an option of a third. The next day, Bevan played his first competitive match since December 2023 in a Scottish League Cup group stage win over Airdrieonians. On 22 August, Bevan scored his first goal for Dundee in the Dundee derby in a win away at Tannadice Park.

== International career ==
Bevan was called up to the Wales national under-19 football team for the 2022 UEFA European Under-19 Championship Group 10 qualifying matches in Norway against Georgia, Norway and Kosovo on 6, 9 and 12 October 2021. In September 2022 Bevan made his debut for the Wales national under-21 football team in the 2–0 friendly match defeat against Austria under-21.

== Career statistics ==
As of match played 21 November 2026

Appearances and goals by club, season and competition
Club	Season	League			National cup		League cup		Other		Total	
Club	Season	Division	Apps	Goals	Apps	Goals	Apps	Goals	Apps	Goals	Apps	Goals
Bournemouth	2021–22	Championship	0	0	0	0	0	0	—		0	0
Bournemouth	2022–23	Premier League	1	0	—		1	0	—		2	0
Bournemouth	2023–24	Premier League	0	0	0	0	0	0	—		0	0
Bournemouth	2024–25	Premier League	0	0	0	0	0	0	—		0	0
Bournemouth	2025–26	Premier League	0	0	0	0	0	0	—		0	0
Bournemouth	Total		1	0	0	0	1	0	—		2	0
Truro City (loan)	2021–22	Southern League; Premier Division South	19	1	—		—		—		19	1
Yeovil Town (loan)	2022–23	National League	31	1	1	0	—		2 (Note: One appearance in FA Trophy, one appearance in Somerset Premier Cup)	0	34	1
Cheltenham Town (loan)	2023–24	League One	13	0	1	0	—		0	0	14	0
Hibernian (loan)	2023–24	Scottish Premiership	0	0	0	0	0	0	0	0	0	0
Dundee	2026–27	Scottish Premiership	12	2	0	0	3	0	0	0	15	2
Career total			76	4	2	0	4	0	2	0	84	4
