= Connor Kurran-Browne =

Guyanese footballer

Personal information
- Full name: Connor Chadney Kurran-Browne
- Date of birth: 26 January 2002 (age 24)
- Place of birth: Hemel Hempstead, England
- Height: 1.83 m (6 ft 0 in)
- Position: Forward

Team information
- Current team: Cheshunt

Youth career
- Harpenden Colts
- 2009–2018: Watford
- 2018–2021: AFC Bournemouth

Senior career*
Years	Team	Apps	(Gls)
2021–2022	AFC Bournemouth	0	(0)
2021–2022	→ King's Lynn Town (loan)	9	(0)
2022–2024	Hampton & Richmond Borough	52	(5)
2024–2025	Hemel Hempstead Town	8	(1)
2025–	Cheshunt	0	(0)

International career^{‡}
2023–	Guyana	1	(0)
- * Club domestic league appearances and goals as of 16:49, 7 July 2025 (UTC) ‡ National team caps and goals as of 14:27, 14 January 2024 (UTC)

Connor Chadney Kurran-Browne (born 26 January 2002) is a professional footballer who plays as a forward for Isthmian League Premier Division club Cheshunt. Born in England, he plays international football for Guyana.

== Career ==
Kurran-Browne was born in Hemel Hempstead, and grew up in Harpenden. He began playing football with his local club Harpenden Colts before joining the youth academy of Watford. In 2018, he moved to the youth academy of AFC Bournemouth. In the summer of 2020 he signed to the club on a professional contract dating 2 years. Kurran-Browne was released at the end of the 2021–22 season following promotion to the Premier League.

On 11 December 2021, Kurran-Browne joined National League side King's Lynn Town on a one-month loan deal.

On 2 June 2022, Kurran-Browne agreed to join Hampton & Richmond Borough following his release from Bournemouth.

In July 2025, Kurran-Browne joined Isthmian League Premier Division side Cheshunt.

== International career ==
Born in England, Kurran-Browne is of Czech and Guyanese descent. He was called up to a preliminary Guyana national team squad in June 2021. He was called up again in the spring of 2023 and later that year made his debut for the Golden Jaguars in a 3–2 victory against Bahamas in the CONCACAF Nations League Qualifiers.

== Career statistics ==
As of end of 2023–24 season

Appearances and goals by club, season and competition
Club	Season	League			FA Cup		EFL Cup		Other		Total	
Club	Season	Division	Apps	Goals	Apps	Goals	Apps	Goals	Apps	Goals	Apps	Goals
AFC Bournemouth	2021–22	Championship	0	0	0	0	0	0	—		0	0
King's Lynn Town (loan)	2021–22	National League	9	0	—		—		2 (Note: Appearances in the FA Trophy)	0	11	0
Hampton & Richmond Borough	2022–23	National League South	32	3	0	0	—		1	0	33	3
Hampton & Richmond Borough	2023–24	National League South	20	2	2	0	—		2	0	24	2
Hampton & Richmond Borough	Total		52	5	2	0	—		3	0	57	5
Career total			61	5	2	0	0	0	5	0	68	5
