= 2020–21 AFC Bournemouth season =

AFC Bournemouth
2020–21 season
- Owner: Maxim Demin
- Chairman: Jeff Mostyn
- Manager: Jason Tindall (until 3 February); Jonathan Woodgate (from 3 February)
- Stadium: Dean Court
- Championship: 6th
- Play-offs: Semi-finals
- FA Cup: Quarter-finals
- EFL Cup: Third round
- Top goalscorer: League: Arnaut Danjuma; Dominic Solanke (15 each); All: Arnaut Danjuma (17)
Home colours	Away colours

The 2020–21 AFC Bournemouth season was the club's 119th season in existence and first season back in the Championship following relegation from the Premier League in the previous season. Bournemouth also competed in the FA Cup and EFL Cup.

== Players ==
=== First-team squad ===
Note: Flags indicate national team as defined under FIFA eligibility rules; some limited exceptions apply. Players may hold more than one non-FIFA nationality.

No.	Pos.	Nation	Player
1	GK	BIH	Asmir Begović
3	DF	ENG	Steve Cook
5	DF	ENG	Lloyd Kelly
6	DF	WAL	Chris Mepham
7	MF	WAL	David Brooks
8	MF	COL	Jefferson Lerma
9	FW	ENG	Dominic Solanke
10	MF	NED	Arnaut Danjuma
11	MF	ENG	Jack Wilshere
14	FW	ENG	Sam Surridge
15	DF	ENG	Adam Smith
16	MF	ENG	Lewis Cook

No.	Pos.	Nation	Player
17	DF	ENG	Jack Stacey
19	MF	ENG	Junior Stanislas
20	FW	ESP	Rodrigo Riquelme (on loan from Atlético Madrid)
21	DF	ESP	Diego Rico
23	GK	IRL	Mark Travers
24	MF	NGR	Nnamdi Ofoborh
26	MF	IRL	Gavin Kilkenny
29	MF	DEN	Philip Billing
32	FW	ENG	Jaidon Anthony
33	DF	ZIM	Jordan Zemura
40	GK	ENG	Will Dennis

=== Out on loan ===
Note: Flags indicate national team as defined under FIFA eligibility rules; some limited exceptions apply. Players may hold more than one non-FIFA nationality.

No.	Pos.	Nation	Player
28	MF	ENG	Kyle Taylor (on loan at Southend United)

== Transfers ==
=== Transfers in ===
Date	Position	Nationality	Name	From	Fee	Ref.
23 July 2020	GK	(England)	Joshua Clarke	(England) Chelsea	Undisclosed	
18 January 2021	CM	(England)	Jack Wilshere	(England) West Ham United	Free transfer	
28 January 2021	CM	(England)	Ben Pearson	(England) Preston North End	Undisclosed	

=== Loans in ===
Date from	Position	Nationality	Name	From	Date until	Ref.
1 October 2020	RW	(Spain)	Rodrigo Riquelme	(Spain) Atlético Madrid	End of season	
16 October 2020	CB	(United States)	Cameron Carter-Vickers	(England) Tottenham Hotspur	End of season	
2 February 2021	CF	(Republic of Ireland)	Shane Long	(England) Southampton	End of season	

=== Loans out ===
Date from	Position	Nationality	Name	To	Date until	Ref.
15 July 2020	CB	(England)	Zeno Ibsen Rossi	(Scotland) Kilmarnock	End of season	
6 August 2020	LM	(England)	Frank Vincent	(England) Scunthorpe United	5 January 2021	
20 August 2020	CB	(England)	Tyler Cordner	(England) Scunthorpe United	14 January 2021	
7 September 2020	CB	(Scotland)	Brennan Camp	(England) Weymouth	End of season	
25 September 2020	CM	(England)	Kyle Taylor	(England) Southend United	1 January 2021	
3 October 2020	CB	(England)	Corey Jordan	(England) Weymouth	1 January 2021	
3 October 2020	DF	(England)	Sam Sherring	(England) Torquay United	End of season	
16 October 2020	CF	(England)	Jake Scrimshaw	(England) Walsall	3 January 2021	
23 December 2020	MF	(Liberia)	Christian Saydee	(England) Weymouth		
6 January 2021	GK	(Republic of Ireland)	Mark Travers	(England) Swindon Town	11 February 2021	
8 January 2021	CF	(England)	Jake Scrimshaw	(Wales) Newport County	End of season	
20 January 2021	LM	(England)	Frank Vincent	(England) Walsall	End of season	
25 January 2021	CB	(England)	Tyler Cordner	(England) Southend United	End of season	
31 January 2021	GK	(England)	Calum Ward	(Finland) HIFK	End of season	
1 February 2021	CM	(Nigeria)	Nnamdi Ofoborh	(England) Wycombe Wanderers	End of season	
2 February 2021	CB	(England)	Dinesh Gillela	(England) Aldershot Town	March 2021	

=== Transfers out ===
Date	Position	Nationality	Name	To	Fee	Ref.
1 July 2020	DF	(England)	Harvey Bertrand	Unattached	Released	
1 July 2020	FW	(England)	Jake Cope	Unattached	Released	
1 July 2020	CF	(England)	Jermain Defoe	(Scotland) Rangers	Free transfer	
1 July 2020	CM	(England)	Tom Dinsmore	(England) Moneyfields	Released	
1 July 2020	LW	(Scotland)	Ryan Fraser	(England) Newcastle United	Released	
1 July 2020	MF	(England)	Luke Gray	Unattached	Released	
1 July 2020	LB	(England)	Tom Hanfrey	Unattached	Released	
1 July 2020	RW	(England)	Jordon Ibe	(England) Derby County	Released	
1 July 2020	RW	(England)	Jordan Murray	Unattached	Released	
1 July 2020	FW	(England)	James Oliver	(England) Buxton	Released	
1 July 2020	FW	(England)	Luke Pardoe	Unattached	Released	
1 July 2020	MF	(England)	Jack Torniainen	Unattached	Released	
17 July 2020	MF	(Bermuda)	Remy Coddington	(England) West Ham United	Undisclosed	
27 July 2020	RB	(England)	Charlie Seaman	(England) Doncaster Rovers	Released	
27 July 2020	GK	(Poland)	Artur Boruc	(Poland) Legia Warsaw	Released	
27 July 2020	LB	(England)	Charlie Daniels	(England) Shrewsbury Town	Released	
27 July 2020	RB	(England)	Simon Francis	Unattached	Released	
27 July 2020	CM	(England)	Andrew Surman	(England) Milton Keynes Dons	Released	
5 August 2020	CB	(Netherlands)	Nathan Aké	(England) Manchester City	£40,000,000	
5 August 2020	LB	(Australia)	Brad Smith	(United States) Seattle Sounders FC	Released	
12 August 2020	LM	(Romania)	Alex Dobre	(France) Dijon FCO	Undisclosed	
19 August 2020	GK	(England)	Aaron Ramsdale	(England) Sheffield United	£18,500,000	
24 August 2020	CM	(England)	Matt Butcher	(England) Accrington Stanley	Undisclosed	
5 September 2020	CB	(England)	Shaun Hobson	(England) Southend United	Free transfer	
7 September 2020	CF	(England)	Callum Wilson	(England) Newcastle United	£20,000,000	
22 September 2020	CM	(Republic of Ireland)	Harry Arter	(England) Nottingham Forest	Undisclosed	
2 October 2020	FW	(England)	Khavarn Williams	(France) Nice	Undisclosed	
31 January 2021	CM	(England)	Dan Gosling	(England) Watford	Undisclosed	
1 February 2021	CB	(England)	Jack Simpson	(Scotland) Rangers	Undisclosed	
2 February 2021	SS	(Norway)	Joshua King	(England) Everton	Nominal fee	
2 February 2021	CF	(England)	Mikael Ndjoli	(England) Barrow	Undisclosed	

== Pre-season and friendlies ==
Win Draw Loss Fixtures

30 August 2020 Friendly	Benfica	2–1	Bournemouth	Lisbon, Portugal
20:00 CEST (UTC+2)	Taarabt 15'; Everton 21'	Report	Danjuma 17'	Stadium: Estádio da Luz; Attendance: 0

5 September 2020 Betway Cup	West Ham United	3–5	Bournemouth	Stratford
15:00 BST (UTC+1)	Bowen 38', 42'; Felipe Anderson 84'	Report	Danjuma 5'; Solanke 17'; Gosling 57'; Smith 62'; Anthony 67'	Stadium: London Stadium; Attendance: 0

== Competitions ==
=== Overview ===
Competition	First match	Last match	Starting round	Final position	Record							
Competition	First match	Last match	Starting round	Final position	Pld	W	D	L	GF	GA	GD	Win %
EFL Championship	11 September 2020	8 May 2021	Matchday 1	6th	46	22	11	13	73	46	+27	47.83
FA Cup	9 January 2021	20 March 2021	Third round	Quarter-finals	4	3	0	1	8	5	+3	75.00
EFL Cup	15 September 2020	24 September 2020	Second round	Third round	2	0	1	1	1	2	−1	0.00
Total					52	25	12	15	82	53	+29	48.08

Last updated: 8 May 2021
Source: Soccerway

=== EFL Championship ===
==== League table ====
Pos	Team	Pld	W	D	L	GF	GA	GD	Pts	Promotion, qualification or relegation
3	Brentford (O, P)	46	24	15	7	79	42	+37	87	Qualification for Championship play-offs
4	Swansea City	46	23	11	12	56	39	+17	80	Qualification for Championship play-offs
5	Barnsley	46	23	9	14	58	50	+8	78	Qualification for Championship play-offs
6	Bournemouth	46	22	11	13	73	46	+27	77	Qualification for Championship play-offs
7	Reading	46	19	13	14	62	54	+8	70	
8	Cardiff City	46	18	14	14	66	49	+17	68	
9	Queens Park Rangers	46	19	11	16	57	55	+2	68	

Source: EFL Official Website
Rules for classification: 1) Points; 2) Goal difference; 3) Number of goals scored; 4) Head-to-head results; 5) Wins; 6) Away goals; 7) Penalty points (sec 9.5); 8) 12-point sending off offences
(O) Play-off winners; (P) Promoted

==== Results summary ====
Overall								Home						Away					
Pld	W	D	L	GF	GA	GD	Pts	W	D	L	GF	GA	GD	W	D	L	GF	GA	GD
46	22	11	13	73	46	+27	77	13	3	7	41	25	+16	9	8	6	32	21	+11

Last updated: 8 May 2021.

==== Results by matchday ====
Matchday	1	2	3	4	5	6	7	8	9	10	11	12	13	14	15	16	17	18	19	20	21	22	23	24	25	26	27	28	29	30	31	32	33	34	35	36	37	38	39	40	41	42	43	44	45	46
Ground	H	A	H	A	H	A	A	H	H	A	A	H	H	A	H	A	A	H	H	A	A	A	H	H	A	A	H	H	A	H	A	H	H	A	A	H	H	H	A	H	A	A	A	H	A	H
Result	W	D	W	W	D	D	D	W	D	L	W	W	W	D	L	W	D	W	W	D	L	W	D	L	L	L	L	W	D	W	L	L	W	W	D	L	W	W	W	W	W	W	W	L	L	L
Position	3	3	4	3	3	4	4	2	3	5	4	2	2	2	2	2	2	2	2	2	5	3	3	3	6	6	6	6	6	6	6	7	6	6	7	7	7	7	7	6	5	5	3	4	5	6

Updated to match(es) played on 8 May 2021. Source:
A = Away; H = Home; W = Win; D = Draw; L = Loss

==== Matches ====
The 2020–21 season fixtures were released on 21 August.

12 September 2020 1	Bournemouth	3–2	Blackburn Rovers	Kings Park
15:00 BST	Stacey 25'; Lerma 53'; Danjuma 84'	Report	Johnson 42'; Armstrong 73'	Stadium: Vitality Stadium; Attendance: 0 Referee: Gavin Ward

19 September 2020 2	Middlesbrough	1–1	Bournemouth	Middlesbrough
15:00 BST	Saville (yellow card) 30'; Browne 81'	Report	Solanke 38'; Mepham (yellow card) 51'; Stacey (yellow card) 63'	Stadium: Riverside Stadium; Attendance: 1,000; Referee: Matt Donohue

27 September 2020 3	Bournemouth	1–0	Norwich City	Kings Park
16:00 BST	Danjuma 35'; Rico (yellow card) 69'	Report	McLean (yellow card) 37'	Stadium: Vitality Stadium; Attendance: 0 Referee: James Linington

2 October 2020 4	Coventry City	1–3	Bournemouth	Bordesley
19:45 BST	Østigård (yellow card) 24'; Godden 39' (pen.); Hamer (red card) 69'	Report	Lerma 7'; Gosling 51', 60' (yellow card) 73'; Smith (yellow card) 68'; S. Cook (yellow card) 68'	Stadium: St Andrew's; Attendance: 0 Referee: Jarred Gillett

17 October 2020 5	Bournemouth	0–0	Queens Park Rangers	Kings Park
15:00 BST	Rico (yellow card) 48'	Report	Kakay (yellow card) 42'; Osayi-Samuel (yellow card) 45+1'; Chair (yellow card) 56'	Stadium: Vitality Stadium; Attendance: 0 Referee: John Brooks

21 October 2020 6	Cardiff City	1–1	Bournemouth	Cardiff
19:45 BST	Wilson 62'; Morrison (yellow card) 66'; Ralls (yellow card) 90'	Report	Solanke 35'	Stadium: Cardiff City Stadium; Attendance: 0 Referee: Simon Hooper

24 October 2020 7	Watford	1–1	Bournemouth	Watford
12:30 BST	Perica 12'; Garner (yellow card) 25'; Cleverley (yellow card) 57'; Chalobah (yellow card) 90+7'	Report	Kelly (yellow card) 2'; Rico (yellow card) 64'; Mepham 90+6'	Stadium: Vicarage Road; Attendance: 0 Referee: Tim Robinson

28 October 2020 8	Bournemouth	1–0	Bristol City	Kings Park
19:45 GMT	Danjuma 81'	Report		Stadium: Vitality Stadium; Attendance: 0 Referee: Steve Martin

31 October 2020 9	Bournemouth	1–1	Derby County	Kings Park
15:00 GMT	Billing (yellow card) 12'; Rico (yellow card) 24'; Riquelme 81'	Report	Knight (yellow card) 2'; Shinnie 14'	Stadium: Vitality Stadium; Attendance: 0 Referee: Robert Jones

3 November 2020 10	Sheffield Wednesday	1–0	Bournemouth	Owlerton
19:00 GMT	Kachunga (yellow card) 10'; Pelupessy (yellow card) 42'; Palmer (yellow card) 44'; Börner (yellow card) 60'; Bannan 69' (pen.); Harris (red card) 90+5'	Report	Lerma (yellow card) 34'; S. Cook (red card) 69'; Mepham (yellow card) 90+9'	Stadium: Hillsborough; Attendance: 0 Referee: Jeremy Simpson

7 November 2020 11	Birmingham City	1–3	Bournemouth	Bordesley
15:00 GMT	Hogan 55'; San José (yellow card) 67'; Jutkiewicz (yellow card) 81'	Report	Danjuma 9'; Brooks 42', 50'; Stanislas (yellow card) 72'	Stadium: St Andrew's; Attendance: 0 Referee: Jarred Gillett

21 November 2020 12	Bournemouth	4–2	Reading	Kings Park
12:30 GMT	Begović (yellow card) 4'; Solanke 56', 89'; Danjuma 59' (yellow card) 73'; L. Cook 77'; Lerma (yellow card) 80'	Report	João 4' (pen.); Aluko 43'; Rinomhota (yellow card) 55'	Stadium: Vitality Stadium; Attendance: 0 Referee: Darren Bond

24 November 2020 13	Bournemouth	2–0	Nottingham Forest	Kings Park
20:00 GMT	Stanislas 3', 51' (pen.); Gosling (yellow card) 80'; L. Cook (yellow card) 86'	Report		Stadium: Vitality Stadium; Attendance: 0 Referee: Simon Hooper

28 November 2020 14	Rotherham United	2–2	Bournemouth	Rotherham
15:00 GMT	Ladapo 37', 50'; Ihiekwe (yellow card) 45'; Smith (yellow card) 52'	Report	Stanislas 20' (pen.); Kelly (yellow card) 43'; Solanke 63'; Lerma (yellow card) 76'; Brooks (yellow card) 84'	Stadium: New York Stadium; Attendance: 0 Referee: Geoff Eltringham

1 December 2020 15	Bournemouth	2–3	Preston North End	Kings Park
19:45 GMT	L. Cook (yellow card) 66'; Stanislas 71'; Lerma (yellow card) 79'; Surridge 86'	Report	Barkhuizen 16'; Sinclair 49'; Bauer 68'; Davies (yellow card) 73'; Pearson (yellow card) 90+2'; Ledson (yellow card) 90+8'	Stadium: Vitality Stadium; Attendance: 0 Referee: Gavin Ward

4 December 2020 16	Barnsley	0–4	Bournemouth	Barnsley
17:30 GMT	Woodrow (yellow card) 32'; Andersen (yellow card) 76'; Sollbauer (yellow card) 85'	Report	Billing 12'; Solanke 45+2'; Rico 52'; Surridge 68'	Stadium: Oakwell Stadium; Attendance: 0 Referee: Keith Stroud

8 December 2020 17	Swansea City	0–0	Bournemouth	Swansea
19:45 GMT	Smith (yellow card) 10'	Report	Solanke (yellow card) 30'; Rico (yellow card) 57'; Billing (yellow card) 73'	Stadium: Liberty Stadium; Attendance: 0 Referee: Peter Bankes

12 December 2020 18	Bournemouth	5–0	Huddersfield Town	Kings Park
15:00 GMT	Solanke 8', 13'; Brooks (yellow card) 17' (goal) 21'; Stanislas 67'; Surridge 70'	Report	Toffolo (yellow card) 38'	Stadium: Vitality Stadium; Attendance: 0 Referee: Oliver Langford

15 December 2020 19	Bournemouth	1–0	Wycombe Wanderers	Kings Park
19:45 GMT	Billing (yellow card) 55'; Stanislas 68'	Report	McCarthy (yellow card) 18'; Pattison (red card) 64'	Stadium: Vitality Stadium; Attendance: 2,000; Referee: Matt Donohue

19 December 2020 20	Luton Town	0–0	Bournemouth	Luton
15:00 GMT	Dewsbury-Hall (yellow card) 82'	Report	Lerma (yellow card) 67'	Stadium: Kenilworth Road; Attendance: 0 Referee: Dean Whitestone

30 December 2020 21	Brentford	2–1	Bournemouth	Brentford
17:30 GMT	Dalsgaard 37'; Fosu 79'	Report	Solanke 25'; L. Cook (yellow card) 41'	Stadium: Brentford Community Stadium; Attendance: 0 Referee: Jarred Gillett

2 January 2021 22	Stoke City	0–1	Bournemouth	Stoke-on-Trent
19:45 GMT	Thompson (yellow card) 57'; Chester (yellow card) 58'; McClean (yellow card) 73'; Souttar (yellow card) 90+5'	Report	Stanislas 79'; Lerma (yellow card) 90+3'	Stadium: Bet365 Stadium; Attendance: 0 Referee: John Brooks

12 January 2021 23	Bournemouth	1–1	Millwall	King's Park
19:00 GMT	Solanke 45+1'; Lerma (yellow card) 82'	Report	Cooper (yellow card) 29'; Leonard (yellow card) 69'; Smith 79'	Stadium: Vitality Stadium; Attendance: 0 Referee: Tim Robinson

16 January 2021 24	Bournemouth	0–1	Luton Town	King's Park
15:00 GMT	Lerma (red card) 26'; Billing (yellow card) 90+3'	Report	Dewsbury-Hall 67'; Pearson (yellow card) 90+2'; Hylton (yellow card) 90+5'	Stadium: Vitality Stadium; Attendance: 0 Referee: David Webb

19 January 2021 25	Derby County	1–0	Bournemouth	Derby
18:00 GMT	Bielik 32'	Report	L. Cook (yellow card) 71'	Stadium: Pride Park Stadium; Attendance: 0 Referee: Oliver Langford

29 January 2021 26	Reading	3–1	Bournemouth	Reading
20:00 GMT	Laurent 24'; McIntyre 32'; Swift (yellow card) 34'; João 43'	Report	Rico (yellow card) 31'; Stanislas 85'	Stadium: Madejski Stadium; Attendance: 0 Referee: James Linington

2 February 2021 27	Bournemouth	1–2	Sheffield Wednesday	King's Park
19:00 GMT	Stanislas 66' (pen.); Riquelme (yellow card) 90+7'	Report	Paterson 44'; Dunkley (yellow card) 83'; Rhodes 90'; Bannan (yellow card) 90+7'	Stadium: Vitality Stadium; Attendance: 0 Referee: Andy Woolmer

6 February 2021 28	Bournemouth	3–2	Birmingham City	King's Park
15:00 GMT	Danjuma 36'; Wilshere 61'; Billing 77', (yellow card) 79'	Report	Hogan 27', 68'; Friend (yellow card) 83'; Gardner (yellow card) 90+2'	Stadium: Vitality Stadium; Attendance: 0 Referee: Jeremy Simpson

13 February 2021 29	Nottingham Forest	0–0	Bournemouth	West Bridgford
12:30 GMT	Cafú (yellow card) 11'; Freeman (yellow card) 46'	Report	Smith (yellow card) 45'	Stadium: The City Ground; Attendance: 0 Referee: Chris Kavanagh

17 February 2021 30	Bournemouth	1–0	Rotherham United	King's Park
19:45 GMT	Billing 23'	Report	Wiles (yellow card) 63'; Harding (yellow card) 73'; Smith (yellow card) 77'	Stadium: Vitality Stadium; Attendance: 0 Referee: Keith Stroud

20 February 2021 31	Queens Park Rangers	2–1	Bournemouth	Shepherd's Bush
15:00 GMT	Barbet (yellow card) 27'; Chair (yellow card) 37'; Johansen 58'; Kane (yellow card) 81', (goal) 83'	Report	Mepham (yellow card) 45+1'; Long 69'	Stadium: Kiyan Prince Foundation Stadium; Attendance: 0 Referee: Darren Bond

24 February 2021 32	Bournemouth	1–2	Cardiff City	King's Park
19:45 GMT	Billing (yellow card) 26'; Long 67'; Cook (yellow card) 76'; Kelly (yellow card) 90+1'	Report	Nelson (yellow card) 26'; Morrison 28'; Moore 37' (pen.), (yellow card) 86'; Ng (yellow card) 77'; Flint (yellow card) 90'	Stadium: Vitality Stadium; Attendance: 0 Referee: Gavin Ward

27 February 2021 33	Bournemouth	1–0	Watford	King's Park
12:30 GMT	Cook (yellow card) 47'; Danjuma 61'; Wilshere (yellow card) 90+3' (yellow-red card) 90+9'; Begović (yellow card) 90+7'	Report	Masina (yellow card) 34'; Hughes (yellow card) 49'; Chalobah (yellow card) 60'; Pedro (yellow card) 90+5' (yellow-red card) 90+7'; Sarr (yellow card) 90+8'	Stadium: Vitality Stadium; Attendance: 0 Referee: Tony Harrington

3 March 2021 34	Bristol City	1–2	Bournemouth	Bristol
19:45 GMT	Bakinson 38'	Report	Stanislas 45+1'; Kelly (yellow card) 70'; Carter-Vickers 88'	Stadium: Ashton Gate; Attendance: 0 Referee: Simon Hooper

6 March 2021 35	Preston North End	1–1	Bournemouth	Preston
15:00 GMT	Johnson (yellow card) 33', (goal) 70'; Cunningham (yellow card) 73'	Report	Danjuma 37'	Stadium: Deepdale; Attendance: 0 Referee: Jarred Gillett

13 March 2021 36	Bournemouth	2–3	Barnsley	King's Park
15:00 GMT	Danjuma 22'; Solanke 45+1'; Surridge (yellow card) 78'; Kelly (yellow card) 86'	Report	Helik 16'; Woodrow (yellow card) 24'; Andersen (yellow card) 43'; Frieser 60'; Morris (yellow card) 75', (goal) 80'	Stadium: Vitality Stadium; Attendance: 0 Referee: John Brooks

16 March 2021 37	Bournemouth	3–0	Swansea City	King's Park
19:45 GMT	Billing 9'; Latibeaudiere 45+1' (o.g.); Rico (yellow card) 58'; Danjuma 87'	Report		Stadium: Vitality Stadium; Attendance: 0 Referee: James Linington

2 April 2021 38	Bournemouth	3–1	Middlesbrough	King's Park
15:00 BST	Billing 14', (yellow card) 59'; Lerma 66'; Smith (yellow card) 79'; Solanke 83'	Report	Watmore 63'; McNair (yellow card) 69'; Bola (yellow card) 90+1'	Stadium: Vitality Stadium; Attendance: 0 Referee: Simon Hooper

5 April 2021 39	Blackburn Rovers	0–2	Bournemouth	Blackburn
15:00 BST	Elliott (yellow card) 78'; Armstrong (penalty missed) 90+2'	Report	Billing 29'; Lerma (yellow card) 50'; Solanke (yellow card) 51'; Danjuma 75'	Stadium: Ewood Park; Attendance: 0 Referee: Darren Bond

10 April 2021 40	Bournemouth	4–1	Coventry City	King's Park
15:00 BST	Danjuma 1', 28'; Brooks 69'; Solanke 90+2'	Report	James 3'; Østigård (yellow card) 75'	Stadium: Vitality Stadium; Attendance: 0 Referee: David Webb

13 April 2021 41	Huddersfield Town	1–2	Bournemouth	Huddersfield
17:30 BST	Hogg 76'	Report	Pearson (yellow card) 12'; Billing 15'; Solanke 45'; Surridge (yellow card) 90+3'	Stadium: The John Smith's Stadium; Attendance: 0 Referee: Jeremy Simpson

17 April 2021 42	Norwich City	1–3	Bournemouth	Norwich
20:00 BST	Buendía 5'; Giannoulis (red card) 17'; Krul (yellow card) 52'; McLean (yellow card) 58'; Skipp (yellow card) 90+1'	Report	Lerma (yellow card) 35'; Surridge 50'; Danjuma 57'; Smith (yellow card) 59'; Brooks (yellow card) 70'; Kelly 76'	Stadium: Carrow Road; Attendance: 0 Referee: Graham Scott

21 April 2021 43	Millwall	1–4	Bournemouth	Bermondsey
18:00 BST	Malone (yellow card) 46'; Wallace 49'; Cooper (yellow card) 65'; McNamara (yellow card) 80'	Report	Billing 16', (yellow card) 80'; Danjuma 27'; Brooks 44'; Solanke 67'	Stadium: The Den; Attendance: 0 Referee: Keith Stroud

24 April 2021 44	Bournemouth	0–1	Brentford	King's Park
12:30 BST	Lerma (yellow card) 68'	Report	Jansson (yellow card) 25' (yellow-red card) 50'; Forss (yellow card) 68'; Mbeumo 77'; Toney (yellow card) 80'; Janelt (yellow card) 87'	Stadium: Vitality Stadium; Attendance: 0 Referee: John Brooks

1 May 2021 45	Wycombe Wanderers	1–0	Bournemouth	High Wycombe
15:00 BST	Ikpeazu 4'; Jacobson (yellow card) 53'	Report	Wilshere (yellow card) 90'	Stadium: Adams Park; Attendance: 0 Referee: Geoff Eltringham

8 May 2021 46	Bournemouth	0–2	Stoke City	King's Park
12:30 BST	Cook (yellow card) 6'; Billing (yellow card) 61'	Report	Forrester 36'; Batth (yellow card) 47'; Smith 52'	Stadium: Vitality Stadium; Attendance: 0 Referee: David Webb

==== Play-offs ====
17 May 2021 Semi-final first leg	Bournemouth	1–0	Brentford	King's Park
18:00 BST	Danjuma 55'	Report	Roerslev (yellow card) 45+4'; Jansson (yellow card) 47'	Stadium: Vitality Stadium; Attendance: 2,000; Referee: Tim Robinson

22 May 2021 Semi-final second leg	Brentford	3–1 (3–2 agg.)	Bournemouth	London
12:30 BST	Toney 16' (pen.), (yellow card) 17'; Janelt 50'; Jansson (yellow card) 78'; Forss 81'; Dalsgaard (yellow card) 90+1'	Report	Danjuma 5'; Begović (yellow card) 17'; Mepham (red card) 28'; Lerma (yellow card) 45+6'; Stacey (yellow card) 90+4'	Stadium: Brentford Community Stadium; Attendance: 3,830; Referee: Jarred Gillett

=== FA Cup ===
The third round draw was made on 30 November, with Premier League and EFL Championship clubs all entering the competition. The draw for the fourth and fifth round were made on 11 January, conducted by Peter Crouch.

9 January 2021 Third round	Oldham Athletic	1–4	Bournemouth	King's Park
15:00 GMT	Bahamboula 45+1' (pen.); Clarke (yellow card) 81'	Report	Brooks 43'; Riquelme 49'; King 74', 86'	Stadium: Vitality Stadium; Attendance: 0 Referee: Andy Woolmer

26 January 2021 Fourth round	Bournemouth	2–1	Crawley Town	King's Park
19:00 GMT	Wilshere 24'; King 65'; Riquelme (yellow card) 87'; Kelly (yellow card) 90+3'	Report	Adebowale (yellow card) 47'; Nichols (yellow card) 58', (goal) 59'; Nadesan (yellow card) 58'	Stadium: Vitality Stadium; Attendance: 0 Referee: Andre Marriner

9 February 2021 Fifth round	Burnley	0–2	Bournemouth	Burnley
17:30 GMT	McNeil (yellow card) 85'; Bardsley (yellow card) 90'	Report	Surridge 21'; Stanislas 88' (pen.); Lerma (yellow card) 90+4'	Stadium: Turf Moor; Attendance: 0 Referee: Darren England

20 March 2021 Quarter-finals	Bournemouth	0–3	Southampton	King's Park
12:15 GMT	Wilshere (yellow card) 84'; Surridge (yellow card) 90+3'	Report	Bednarek (yellow card) 30'; Djenepo 37'; Redmond 45+1', 59'; Vestergaard (yellow card) 74'	Stadium: Vitality Stadium; Attendance: 0 Referee: Martin Atkinson

=== EFL Cup ===
The draw for both the second and third round were confirmed on September 6, live on Sky Sports by Phil Babb.

15 September 2020 Second round	Bournemouth	0–0 (11–10 p)	Crystal Palace	Kings Park
19:45 BST		Report		Stadium: Vitality Stadium; Attendance: 0 Referee: Keith Stroud
	Penalties
	Brooks (penalty scored); Surridge (penalty scored); Billing (penalty scored); Kelly (penalty scored); Solanke (penalty scored); Simpson (penalty scored); Gosling (penalty scored); Lerma (penalty scored); Ofoborh (penalty scored); Zemura (penalty scored); Begović (penalty missed); Brooks (penalty scored)		(penalty scored) Milivojević; (penalty scored) Batshuayi; (penalty scored) Townsend; (penalty scored) Eze; (penalty scored) Ayew; (penalty scored) Meyer; (penalty scored) Sakho; (penalty scored) Kelly; (penalty scored) Inniss; (penalty scored) Jach; (penalty missed) Hennessey; (penalty missed) Milivojević

24 September 2020 Third round	Manchester City	2–1	Bournemouth	Manchester
19:45 BST	Delap 18', (yellow card) 79'; Foden 75'	Report	Surridge 22'; Zemura (yellow card) 70'; L. Cook (yellow card) 90+2'	Stadium: Etihad Stadium; Attendance: 0 Referee: Jonathan Moss

== Statistics ==
=== Appearances and goals ===
As of 22 May 2021

No.	Pos	Nat	Player	Total		Championship		Play-offs		FA Cup		EFL Cup	
No.	Pos	Nat	Player	Apps	Goals	Apps	Goals	Apps	Goals	Apps	Goals	Apps	Goals
Goalkeepers
1	GK	(Bosnia and Herzegovina) BIH	Asmir Begović	51	0	45	0	2	0	3	0	1	0
23	GK	(Republic of Ireland) IRL	Mark Travers	2	0	1	0	0	0	0	0	1	0
40	GK	(England) ENG	Will Dennis	1	0	0	0	0	0	1	0	0	0
Defenders
3	DF	(England) ENG	Steve Cook	47	0	42	0	1	0	3	0	0+1	0
5	DF	(England) ENG	Lloyd Kelly	41	1	33+3	1	2	0	1	0	2	0
6	DF	(Wales) WAL	Chris Mepham	28	1	20+4	1	1+1	0	0+2	0	0	0
15	DF	(England) ENG	Adam Smith	46	0	38+3	0	2	0	0+2	0	1	0
17	DF	(England) ENG	Jack Stacey	37	1	18+12	1	0+2	0	4	0	1	0
18	DF	(United States) USA	Cameron Carter-Vickers	26	1	21	1	2	0	3	0	0	0
21	DF	(Spain) ESP	Diego Rico	38	1	23+9	1	0+1	0	3+1	0	1	0
33	DF	(Zimbabwe) ZIM	Jordan Zemura	5	0	0+2	0	0	0	1	0	1+1	0
Midfielders
7	MF	(Wales) WAL	David Brooks	39	6	25+7	5	2	0	3	1	2	0
8	MF	(Colombia) COL	Jefferson Lerma	48	3	40+2	3	2	0	1+2	0	0+1	0
11	MF	(England) ENG	Jack Wilshere	17	2	9+5	1	0+1	0	2	1	0	0
16	MF	(England) ENG	Lewis Cook	35	1	30+1	1	0	0	1+1	0	2	0
19	MF	(England) ENG	Junior Stanislas	36	11	29+6	10	0	0	1	1	0	0
22	MF	(England) ENG	Ben Pearson	20	0	11+5	0	2	0	2	0	0	0
26	MF	(Republic of Ireland) IRL	Gavin Kilkenny	4	0	0+1	0	0	0	1+1	0	0+1	0
29	MF	(Denmark) DEN	Philip Billing	42	8	23+11	8	2	0	4	0	2	0
Forwards
9	FW	(England) ENG	Dominic Solanke	45	15	38+2	15	2	0	1+1	0	0+1	0
10	FW	(Netherlands) NED	Arnaut Danjuma	38	17	29+4	15	2	2	2	0	0+1	0
12	FW	(Republic of Ireland) IRL	Shane Long	12	2	4+7	2	0+1	0	0	0	0	0
14	FW	(England) ENG	Sam Surridge	35	6	7+22	4	0	0	1+3	1	2	1
20	FW	(Spain) ESP	Rodrigo Riquelme	19	2	2+14	1	0	0	2+1	1	0	0
32	FW	(England) ENG	Jaidon Anthony	7	0	0+5	0	0	0	0+2	0	0	0
Players who have made an appearance or had a squad number this season but have left the club
4	MF	(England) ENG	Dan Gosling	18	2	7+8	2	0	0	1	0	1+1	0
18	MF	(Republic of Ireland) IRL	Harry Arter	1	0	0	0	0	0	0	0	1	0
24	MF	(Nigeria) NGR	Nnamdi Ofoborh	5	0	0+3	0	0	0	0	0	2	0
25	DF	(England) ENG	Jack Simpson	12	0	6+3	0	0	0	1	0	2	0
27	FW	(Norway) NOR	Joshua King	14	3	5+7	0	0	0	2	3	0	0

=== Disciplinary record ===
As of 2 October 2020

Rank	Position	Name	Championship		FA Cup		League Cup		Total	
Rank	Position	Name	Yellow card	Red card	Yellow card	Red card	Yellow card	Red card	Yellow card	Red card
1	DF	(England) Steve Cook	2	0	0	0	0	0	2	0
2	DF	(Wales) Chris Mepham	1	0	0	0	0	0	1	0
2	DF	(England) Adam Smith	1	0	0	0	0	0	1	0
2	DF	(England) Jack Stacey	1	0	0	0	0	0	1	0
2	DF	(Spain) Diego Rico	1	0	0	0	0	0	1	0
2	DF	(Zimbabwe) Jordan Zemura	0	0	0	0	1	0	1	0
2	MF	(England) Dan Gosling	1	0	0	0	0	0	1	0
2	MF	(Colombia) Jefferson Lerma	1	0	0	0	0	0	1	0
2	MF	(England) Lewis Cook	0	0	0	0	1	0	1	0
Total			8	0	0	0	2	0	10	0
