= 2021–22 AFC Bournemouth season =

Bournemouth
2021–22 season
- Owner: Maxim Demin
- Chairman: Jeff Mostyn
- Head coach: Scott Parker
- Stadium: Dean Court
- Championship: 2nd (promoted)
- FA Cup: Fourth round
- EFL Cup: Second round
- Top goalscorer: League: Dominic Solanke (29); All: Dominic Solanke (30)
Home colours	Away colours

The 2021–22 season was Bournemouth's second consecutive season in the Championship and the 120th year in their history. This season, the club participated in the Championship, FA Cup and EFL Cup. The season covered the period from 1 July 2021 to 30 June 2022.

With a 1–0 home win over Nottingham Forest on 3 May 2022, Bournemouth secured automatic promotion back to the Premier League after a two-year absence.

== Managerial changes ==
On 27 June 2021, it was announced that Jonathan Woodgate would leave as role as first team manager when his contract expired on 30 June 2021. A day later the club announced Scott Parker as the new head coach on a three-year contract.

== Pre-season friendlies ==
The Cherries announced pre-season friendlies against Linense, Granada and Chelsea as part of their preparations for the new season.

16 July 2021 Friendly	Bournemouth	4–2	Linense	Marbella, Spain
19:00 CEST	Anthony 16'; Solanke 52'; Taylor 55', 79'	Report	Koroma 35'; Alcalde 59'	Stadium: Marbella Football Center

19 July 2021 Friendly	Granada	2–1	Bournemouth	Marbella, Spain
19:00 CEST	Soro 27'; Suárez 58'	Report	Solanke 31'	Stadium: Marbella Football Centre

27 July 2021 Friendly	Bournemouth	1–2	Chelsea	Kings Park
19:45 BST	Marcondes 66'	Report	Broja 71'; Ugbo 75'	Stadium: Vitality Stadium

== Competitions ==
=== Championship ===
==== League table ====
Pos	Team	Pld	W	D	L	GF	GA	GD	Pts	Promotion, qualification or relegation
1	Fulham (C, P)	46	27	9	10	106	43	+63	90	Promotion to the Premier League
2	Bournemouth (P)	46	25	13	8	74	39	+35	88	Promotion to the Premier League
3	Huddersfield Town	46	23	13	10	64	47	+17	82	Qualification for Championship play-offs
4	Nottingham Forest (O, P)	46	23	11	12	73	40	+33	80	Qualification for Championship play-offs
5	Sheffield United	46	21	12	13	63	45	+18	75	Qualification for Championship play-offs
6	Luton Town	46	21	12	13	63	55	+8	75	Qualification for Championship play-offs

Source: EFL Official Website
Rules for classification: 1) Points; 2) Goal difference; 3) Number of goals scored; 4) Head-to-head results; 5) Wins; 6) Away goals; 7) Penalty points (sec 9.5); 8) 12-point sending off offences
(C) Champions; (O) Play-off winners; (P) Promoted

==== Results summary ====
Overall								Home						Away					
Pld	W	D	L	GF	GA	GD	Pts	W	D	L	GF	GA	GD	W	D	L	GF	GA	GD
46	25	13	8	74	39	+35	88	14	7	3	42	21	+21	11	6	5	32	18	+14

Last updated: 7 May 2022.

==== Results by matchday ====
Matchday	1	2	3	4	5	6	7	8	9	10	11	12	13	14	15	16	17	18	19	20	21	22	23	24	25	26	27	28	29	30	31	32	33	34	35	36	37	38	39	40	41	42	43	44	45	46
Ground	H	A	A	H	A	H	H	A	H	A	H	A	A	H	A	H	H	A	A	H	A	H	A	A	H	A	H	A	H	A	H	A	H	H	H	A	H	A	A	H	A	H	A	A	H	H
Result	D	W	W	D	D	W	W	W	W	D	W	W	W	W	W	L	W	L	D	D	D	L	L	W	W	L	L	W	W	W	W	L	D	W	D	W	W	L	D	D	W	D	D	W	W	W
Position	1	5	4	7	6	5	1	1	1	2	1	1	1	1	1	1	1	2	2	2	2	2	2	1	2	2	3	3	2	2	2	3	2	2	2	2	2	2	2	2	2	2	2	2	2	2

Updated to match(es) played on 7 May 2022. Source: Statto.com
A = Away; H = Home; W = Win; D = Draw; L = Loss

==== Matches ====
The Cherries fixtures were released on 24 June 2021.

6 August 2021 1	Bournemouth	2–2	West Bromwich Albion	Kings Park
19:45 BST	Marcondes 12'; Billing 52'	Report	O'Shea 33'; Robinson 67'	Stadium: Vitality Stadium; Attendance: 9,254; Referee: Dean Whitestone
Note: Live on Sky Sports

14 August 2021 2	Nottingham Forest	1–2	Bournemouth	West Bridgford
15:00 BST	McKenna 48'	Report	Brooks 28'; Billing 58'	Stadium: City Ground; Attendance: 25,035; Referee: Geoff Eltringham

18 August 2021 3	Birmingham City	0–2	Bournemouth	Birmingham
19:45 BST	Pedersen (yellow card) 74'	Report	Solanke 77'; Anthony 87'	Stadium: St Andrew's; Attendance: 9,922; Referee: Andy Davies

21 August 2021 4	Bournemouth	2–2	Blackpool	Kings Park
15:00 BST	Solanke 6', 19'	Report	Garbutt (yellow card) 8'; John-Jules (yellow card) 38'; Connolly (yellow card) 42'; Husband 57'; Yates 60' (pen.); Ekpiteta (yellow card) 84'	Stadium: Vitality Stadium; Attendance: 9,187; Referee: Steve Martin

28 August 2021 5	Hull City	0–0	Bournemouth	Kingston upon Hull
15:00 BST		Report	Stacey (yellow card) 45+2'; Pearson (yellow card) 90+3'	Stadium: MKM Stadium; Attendance: 10,199; Referee: Geoff Eltringham

11 September 2021 6	Bournemouth	3–0	Barnsley	Kings Park
15:00 BST	Zemura 8', 82'; Billing (yellow card) 23'; Kelly (yellow card) 36'; Solanke 46'; Lerma (yellow card) 90+6'	Report	Helik (yellow card) 60'; Brittain (yellow card) 88'; Moon (yellow card) 90+6'	Stadium: Vitality Stadium; Attendance: 9,485; Referee: James Linington

14 September 2021 7	Bournemouth	2–1	Queens Park Rangers	Kings Park
19:45 BST	Zemura (yellow card) 10'; Anthony 12'; Solanke 37'; Brooks (yellow card) 45'; Kelly (yellow card) 87'; Billing (yellow card) 90+2'; Smith (yellow card) 90+5'	Report	Johansen (yellow card) 45'; McCallum 57'; Willock (yellow card) 72'; Barbet (yellow card) 90+5'	Stadium: Vitality Stadium; Attendance: 10,495; Referee: Keith Stroud

18 September 2021 8	Cardiff City	0–1	Bournemouth	Cardiff
15:00 BST	Harris (yellow card) 36'; Nelson (yellow card) 45+1'; Bacuna (yellow card) 88'	Report	Christie (yellow card) 24'; Lerma (yellow card) 52'; Billing 54'; Smith (yellow card) 88'	Stadium: Cardiff City Stadium; Attendance: 19,090; Referee: Josh Smith

25 September 2021 9	Bournemouth	2–1	Luton Town	King's Park
15:00 BST	Billing 17'; Solanke 31'; Pearson (yellow card) 49'; Lowe (yellow card) 90+3'	Report	Burke 64'	Stadium: Vitality Stadium; Attendance: 9,737; Referee: Tim Robinson

29 September 2021 10	Peterborough United	0–0	Bournemouth	Peterborough
19:45 BST	Burrows (yellow card) 81'	Report		Stadium: Weston Homes Stadium; Attendance: 8,971; Referee: Andy Woolmer

2 October 2021 11	Bournemouth	2–1	Sheffield United	Kings Park
15:00 BST	Pearson (yellow card) 47'; Smith (yellow card) 55'; Solanke 62' (pen.); Billing 65'; Zemura (yellow card) 80'	Report	Fleck (yellow card) 7'; Osborn (yellow card) 55'; Gibbs-White 56'	Stadium: Vitality Stadium; Attendance: 9,349; Referee: Robert Jones

16 October 2021 12	Bristol City	0–2	Bournemouth	Ashton Gate
15:00 BST		Report	Lowe 21'; Cahill (yellow card) 40'; Zemura 45+1'; Kelly (yellow card) 68'	Stadium: Ashton Gate; Attendance: 20,828; Referee: Gavin Ward

19 October 2021 13	Stoke City	0–1	Bournemouth	Stoke-on-Trent
19:45 BST		Report	Kilkenny (yellow card) 3'; Solanke 51'; Zemura (yellow card) 59'	Stadium: Bet365 Stadium; Attendance: 18,427; Referee: Dean Whitestone

23 October 2021 14	Bournemouth	3–0	Huddersfield Town	Kings Park
15:00 BST	Solanke 10', 21'; Anthony (yellow card) 18'; Kilkenny (yellow card) 29'; Kelly 64'	Report		Stadium: Vitality Stadium; Attendance: 9,253; Referee: John Brooks

30 October 2021 15	Reading	0–2	Bournemouth	Reading
20:00 BST	Laurent (yellow card) 13'	Report	Kilkenny (yellow card) 37'; Anthony (yellow card) 38'; Solanke 43'; Lowe 59'; Mepham (yellow card) 90+1'	Stadium: Select Car Leasing Stadium; Attendance: 13,551; Referee: Oliver Langford

2 November 2021 16	Bournemouth	1–2	Preston North End	Kings Park
19:45 GMT	Lerma (yellow card) 58'; Billing 60', (yellow card) 83'; Mepham (yellow card) 62'	Report	Whiteman 52'; McCann 78'; Barkhuizen (yellow card) 84'	Stadium: Vitality Stadium; Attendance: 8,578; Referee: David Webb

6 November 2021 17	Bournemouth	4–0	Swansea City	Kings Park
15:00 GMT	Solanke 26', (yellow card) 40', (goal) 49'; Billing (yellow card) 29'; Anthony 64', 90+4'	Report	Downes (yellow card) 30'; Bennett (yellow card) 39'; Ntcham (yellow card) 54'	Stadium: Vitality Stadium; Attendance: 9,725; Referee: Tony Harrington

21 November 2021 18	Derby County	3–2	Bournemouth	Derby
12:00 GMT	Knight 13'; Lawrence 62', 69' (pen.)	Report	Anthony 19'; Solanke 38'; Billing (yellow card) 53'	Stadium: Pride Park; Attendance: 20,764; Referee: Gavin Ward

24 November 2021 19	Millwall	1–1	Bournemouth	Bermondsey
19:45 GMT	Afobe 67'; Mitchell (yellow card) 83'	Report	Kilkenny (yellow card) 24'; Solanke 44'; Cook (yellow card) 80'	Stadium: The Den; Attendance: 12,237; Referee: Dean Whitestone

27 November 2021 20	Bournemouth	2–2	Coventry City	Kings Park
15:00 GMT	Anthony 45'; Cook (yellow card) 54'; Billing 66'; Lerma (red card) 68'; Mepham (yellow card) 74'	Report	McFadzean (yellow card) 45+1'; Godden 85'; Kane 90+5'	Stadium: Vitality Stadium; Attendance: 11,094; Referee: David Coote

3 December 2021 21	Fulham	1–1	Bournemouth	Fulham
19:45 GMT	Carvalho (yellow card) 51'; Bryan (yellow card) 68'; Decordova-Reid (yellow card) 82'; Adarabioyo 84'	Report	Cook (yellow card) 16'; Stacey (yellow card) 34'; Solanke 46'; Smith (yellow card) 61'; Travers (yellow card) 62'; Christie (yellow card) 80'; Billing (yellow card) 88'	Stadium: Craven Cottage; Attendance: 19,020; Referee: Tim Robinson

11 December 2021 22	Bournemouth	0–2	Blackburn Rovers	Kings Park
15:00 GMT	Cook (yellow card) 38'; Stacey (yellow card) 55'; Marcondes (yellow card) 62'	Report	Pearson 21' (o.g.); Brereton (yellow card) 42' van Hecke 65', (yellow card) 86'; Buckley (yellow card) 90+1'; Rothwell (yellow card) 90+2'	Stadium: Vitality Stadium; Attendance: 10,064; Referee: Simon Hooper

18 December 2021 23	Middlesbrough	1–0	Bournemouth	Middlesbrough
12:30 GMT	Šporar 53' (pen.); McNair (yellow card) 66'; Taylor (yellow card) 77'; Jones (yellow card) 82'; Hernández (yellow card) 86'	Report	Cahill (yellow card) 43'; Billing (yellow card) 57'	Stadium: Riverside Stadium; Attendance: 18,323; Referee: Chris Kavanagh

27 December 2021 24	Queens Park Rangers	0–1	Bournemouth	Shepherd's Bush, London
17:30 GMT	Field (yellow card) 40'; Dozzell (yellow card) 58' (yellow-red card) 90+8'; Barbet (yellow card) 90+7'	Report	Solanke 41'; Christie (yellow card) 56'; Billing (yellow card) 76'; Mepham (yellow card) 90+7'; Pearson (yellow card) 90+7'	Stadium: Kiyan Prince Foundation Stadium; Attendance: 16,308; Referee: Keith Stroud

30 December 2021 25	Bournemouth	3–0	Cardiff City	Kings Park
19:45 GMT	Christie 25'; Solanke (yellow card) 45+3', (goal) 68'; Smithies 83' (o.g.)	Report	Harris (yellow card) 27'; Bacuna (red card) 45+2'; Nelson (yellow card) 45+3'	Stadium: Vitality Stadium; Attendance: 8,942; Referee: James Linington

15 January 2022 26	Luton Town	3–2	Bournemouth	Luton
12:30 GMT	Kelly 30' (o.g.); Campbell 42'; Naismith 90+7'	Report	Marcondes 51'; Rogers 78'; Lerma (yellow card) 81'; Christie (yellow card) 89'	Stadium: Kenilworth Road; Attendance: 9,469; Referee: Leigh Doughty

22 January 2022 27	Bournemouth	0–1	Hull City	Kings Park
15:00 GMT	Stacey (yellow card) 21'; Lerma (yellow card) 58'	Report	Smallwood (yellow card) 57'; Longman 77'; Smith (yellow card) 90+9'	Stadium: Vitality Stadium; Attendance: 8,823; Referee: Matt Donohue

29 January 2022 28	Barnsley	0–1	Bournemouth	Barnsley
15:00 GMT		Report	Billing 12'; Cahill (yellow card) 66' (yellow-red card) 88'; Solanke (yellow card) 71'; Zemura (yellow card) 90+2'	Stadium: Oakwell; Attendance: 11,972; Referee: Andre Marriner

9 February 2022 29	Bournemouth	3–1	Birmingham City	Kings Park
19:45 GMT	Christie 17'; Solanke 31'; Lerma (red card) 66'; Anthony 76'	Report	Gardner (yellow card) 20'; Pedersen (yellow card) 34'; Graham (yellow card) 47'; Hernández (yellow card) 67', (goal) 69'; Šunjić (yellow card) 90+4'	Stadium: Vitality Stadium; Attendance: 8,708; Referee: James Linington

12 February 2022 30	Blackpool	1–2	Bournemouth	Blackpool
15:00 GMT	Bowler 37'; Sterling (yellow card) 89'; Connolly (yellow card) 90+5'	Report	Solanke (penalty missed) 27'; Marcondes (yellow card) 85'; Lowe 86'; Dembélé 90+5'	Stadium: Bloomfield Road; Attendance: 11,141; Referee: Dean Whitestone

26 February 2022 31	Bournemouth	2–1	Stoke City	Kings Park
15:00 GMT	Mepham (yellow card) 40'; Lowe (yellow card) 43', (goal) 89'; Cook (yellow card) 72'; Kelly (yellow card) 82'; Solanke 83'	Report	Smith 20', (yellow card) 25'; Fox (red card) 32'; Brown (yellow card) 39'; Thompson (yellow card) 57'	Stadium: Vitality Stadium; Attendance: 9,613; Referee: Tim Robinson

5 March 2022 32	Preston North End	2–1	Bournemouth	Preston
15:00 GMT	Potts (yellow card) 24'; Archer 54' van den Berg (yellow card) 58'; Johnson (yellow card) 82'; Riis Jakobsen 89'; Browne (yellow card) 90'	Report	Lowe 50'; Billing (yellow card) 90+8'	Stadium: Deepdale; Attendance: 12,173; Referee: Matt Donohue

8 March 2022 33	Bournemouth	1–1	Peterborough United	Kings Park
19:45 GMT	Zemura (yellow card) 33'; Christie 52'; Billing (yellow card) 65'	Report	Marriott 30'; Burrows (yellow card) 83'	Stadium: Vitality Stadium; Attendance: 8,293; Referee: Gavin Ward

12 March 2022 34	Bournemouth	2–0	Derby County	Kings Park
15:00 GMT	Stacey (yellow card) 45+1'; Solanke 45+5'; Cantwell (yellow card) 63'; Christie (yellow card) 89'; Lowe 90'	Report	Morrison (yellow card) 69'; Davies (yellow card) 71'	Stadium: Vitality Stadium; Attendance: 9,979; Referee: Andy Madley

15 March 2022 35	Bournemouth	1–1	Reading	Kings Park
19:45 GMT	Solanke 8'; Cantwell (yellow card) 27'; Lerma (yellow card) 90'	Report	Laurent (yellow card) 33'; Ince 83'	Stadium: Vitality Stadium; Attendance: 9,085; Referee: Leigh Doughty

19 March 2022 36	Huddersfield Town	0–3	Bournemouth	Huddersfield
15:00 GMT		Report	Anthony 19'; Lerma 31', (yellow card) 62'; Travers (yellow card) 36'; Christie (yellow card) 39'; Solanke 46'	Stadium: John Smith's Stadium; Attendance: 20,336; Referee: Simon Hooper

2 April 2022 37	Bournemouth	3–2	Bristol City	Kings Park
15:00 BST	Solanke 40'; Cook 52'; Dembélé 81'	Report	Atkinson 4'; Cundy (yellow card) 73'; Weimann 90+2'	Stadium: Vitality Stadium; Attendance: 9,937; Referee: Steve Martin

6 April 2022 38	West Bromwich Albion	2–0	Bournemouth	West Bromwich
20:00 BST	Mowatt 9'; Carroll 13'; Furlong (yellow card) 56'; Bartley (yellow card) 83'; Johnstone (yellow card) 84'	Report	Zemura (yellow card) 45+2'; Kelly (yellow card) 52'; Solanke (yellow card) 83'	Stadium: The Hawthorns; Attendance: 20,501; Referee: Keith Stroud

9 April 2022 39	Sheffield United	0–0	Bournemouth	Sheffield
12:45 BST	Stevens (yellow card) 24'; Fleck (yellow card) 35'; Egan (yellow card) 71'	Report	Billing (yellow card) 74'; Kelly (yellow card) 90+3'	Stadium: Bramall Lane; Attendance: 26,769; Referee: Dean Whitestone

15 April 2022 40	Bournemouth	0–0	Middlesbrough	Kings Park
15:00 BST	Billing (yellow card) 61'	Report	Crooks (yellow card) 88'; Jones (yellow card) 90+1'	Stadium: Vitality Stadium; Attendance: 9,903; Referee: Tim Robinson

18 April 2022 41	Coventry City	0–3	Bournemouth	Coventry
15:00 BST		Report	Lowe 12'; Solanke 45', 55'	Stadium: Coventry Building Society Arena; Attendance: 24,492; Referee: Matt Donohue

23 April 2022 42	Bournemouth	1–1	Fulham	Kings Park
15:00 BST	Cook (yellow card) 1'; Phillips (yellow card) 63'; Smith (yellow card) 76'; Solanke 90+8' (pen.)	Report	Bryan (yellow card) 36'; Mitrović 56', (yellow card) 88'; Reed (yellow card) 60'; Robinson (yellow card) 75'; Rodák (yellow card) 90+1'; Tete (yellow card) 90+3'; Adarabioyo (yellow card) 90+6'	Stadium: Vitality Stadium; Attendance: 10,352; Referee: Graham Scott

26 April 2022 43	Swansea City	3–3	Bournemouth	Landore
19:45 BST	Piroe 5', 12'; Christie (yellow card) 45+4', (goal) 58'; Smith (yellow card) 53'	Report	Lowe (yellow card) 30'; Anthony (yellow card) 56'; Phillips (yellow card) 67'; Moore 72', 90'; Billing (yellow card) 75'; Solanke 81' (pen.), (yellow card) 90+6'; Lerma (yellow card) 84'	Stadium: Swansea.com Stadium; Attendance: 17,780; Referee: Darren Bond

30 April 2022 44	Blackburn Rovers	0–3	Bournemouth	Blackburn
15:00 BST	Wharton (yellow card) 15'; Hedges (yellow card) 40'; Buckley (yellow card) 48' van Hecke (yellow card) 52'	Report	Phillips (yellow card) 3'; Solanke 21'; Billing 70', 79'; Zemura (yellow card) 87'	Stadium: Ewood Park; Attendance: 21,396; Referee: Keith Stroud

3 May 2022 45	Bournemouth	1–0	Nottingham Forest	Bournemouth
19:00 BST	Moore 83'; Travers (yellow card) 90+6'; Solanke (yellow card) 90+8'	Report	McKenna (yellow card) 82'; Spence (yellow card) 90+1'	Stadium: Vitality Stadium; Attendance: 10,563; Referee: Stuart Attwell

7 May 2022 46	Bournemouth	1–0	Millwall	Kings Park
12:30 BST	Moore 81'	Report	Kieftenbeld (yellow card) 68'; Saville (yellow card) 82'	Stadium: Vitality Stadium; Attendance: 10,244; Referee: Andre Marriner

=== FA Cup ===
Bournemouth were drawn away to Yeovil Town in the third round, and home to Boreham Wood in the fourth round.

8 January 2022 Third round	Yeovil Town	1–3	Bournemouth	Yeovil
17:45 GMT	Gorman (yellow card) 2'; Worthington (yellow card) 8'; Moss (yellow card) 34'; Quigley 48'	Report	Marcondes 19', 43', 70'; Pearson (yellow card) 65'; Ibsen Rossi (yellow card) 90+1'; Brady (yellow card) 90+5'	Stadium: Huish Park; Attendance: 7,818; Referee: Jeremy Simpson

6 February 2022 Fourth round	Bournemouth	0–1	Boreham Wood	Kings Park
18:30 GMT	Phillips (yellow card) 47'	Report	Ricketts 38'; Stephens (yellow card) 62'; Marsh (yellow card) 63'; Ashby-Hammond (yellow card) 86'	Stadium: Vitality Stadium; Attendance: 9,548; Referee: Graham Scott

=== EFL Cup ===
Bournemouth were drawn at home to Milton Keynes Dons in the first round and away to Norwich City in the second round.

31 July 2021 First round	Bournemouth	5–0	Milton Keynes Dons	Kings Park
15:00 BST	Brooks 35', 83'; Solanke 47'; Billing 72'; Saydee 80'	Report		Stadium: Vitality Stadium; Attendance: 5,746; Referee: Sam Purkiss

24 August 2021 Second round	Norwich City	6–0	Bournemouth	Norwich
19:00 BST	Tzolis 12', 66'; McLean 26'; Rupp 33'; Sargent 49', 75'	Report		Stadium: Carrow Road; Attendance: 20,090; Referee: Charles Breakspear

== Transfers ==
=== Transfers in ===
Date	Position	Nationality	Name	From	Fee	Ref.
2 July 2021	AM	(Denmark)	Emiliano Marcondes	(England) Brentford	Free transfer	
17 August 2021	GK	(Norway)	Ørjan Nyland	(England) Norwich City	Free transfer	
20 August 2021	CB	(England)	Gary Cahill	(England) Crystal Palace	Free transfer	
31 August 2021	AM	(Scotland)	Ryan Christie	(Scotland) Celtic	Undisclosed	
31 August 2021	RW	(Jamaica)	Jamal Lowe	(Wales) Swansea City	Undisclosed	
18 October 2021	LM	(Republic of Ireland)	Robbie Brady	(England) Burnley	Free transfer	
5 January 2022	CB	(England)	James Hill	(England) Fleetwood Town	Undisclosed	
31 January 2022	LW	(Scotland)	Siriki Dembélé	(England) Peterborough United	Undisclosed	
31 January 2022	CF	(Wales)	Kieffer Moore	(Wales) Cardiff City	Undisclosed	

=== Loans in ===
Date from	Position	Nationality	Name	From	Date until	Ref.
27 July 2021	LB	(England)	Leif Davis	(England) Leeds United	End of season	
23 August 2021	LW	(England)	Morgan Rogers	(England) Manchester City	End of season	
6 January 2022	RB	(England)	Ethan Laird	(England) Manchester United	End of season	
31 January 2022	CB	(England)	Nathaniel Phillips	(England) Liverpool	End of season	
31 January 2022	GK	(England)	Freddie Woodman	(England) Newcastle United	End of season	
31 January 2022	CM	(England)	Todd Cantwell	(England) Norwich	End of season	

=== Loans out ===
Date from	Position	Nationality	Name	To	Date until	Ref.
10 August 2021	GK	(England)	Billy Terrell	(England) Wimborne Town	End of season	
20 August 2021	CB	(England)	Sam Sherring	(England) Accrington Stanley	11 January 2022	
20 August 2021	CF	(England)	Jake Scrimshaw	(England) Scunthorpe United	11 January 2022	
10 September 2021	CF	(England)	Euan Pollock	(England) Truro City	1 January 2022	
2 October 2021	RB	(England)	Brooklyn Genesini	(England) Poole Town	2 January 2022	
22 October 2021	RM	(England)	Ryan Glover	(England) Aldershot Town	End of season	
11 December 2021	GK	(England)	Will Dennis	(England) Wealdstone	6 January 2022	
11 December 2021	FW	(Guyana)	Connor Kurran-Browne	(England) King's Lynn Town	End of season	
16 December 2021	CM	(England)	Luke Nippard	(England) Eastbourne Borough	End of season	
11 January 2022	CB	(England)	Sam Sherring	(England) Cambridge United	End of season	
14 January 2022	CB	(Wales)	Owen Bevan	(England) Truro City	End of season	
31 January 2022	CF	(England)	Christian Saydee	(England) Burton Albion	End of season	
9 February 2022	CB	(England)	Zeno Ibsen Rossi	(Scotland) Dundee	End of season	
21 February 2022	RB	(Scotland)	Brennan Camp	(England) Eastleigh	End of season	
22 February 2022	LB	(France)	Noa Boutin	(England) Poole Town	Work experience	
22 February 2022	AM	(Nigeria)	Ferdinand Okoh	(England) Truro City	Work experience	
23 February 2022	RW	(Northern Ireland)	Marcus Daws	(England) Poole Town	Work experience	
25 February 2022	CB	(England)	Aaron Roberts	(England) Wimborne Town	Work experience	
4 March 2022	CM	(England)	Matt Burgess	(England) Truro City	Work experience	
24 March 2022	LB	(Republic of Ireland)	Ben Greenwood	(England) Weymouth	April 2022	

=== Transfers out ===
Date	Position	Nationality	Name	To	Fee	Ref.
30 June 2021	GK	(England)	Joe Besant	(Portugal) Nacional	Released	
30 June 2021	CB	(England)	Brandon Channell		Released	
30 June 2021	CB	(England)	Tyler Cordner	(England) Weymouth	Released	
30 June 2021	CB	(England)	Dinesh Gillela	(England) Hayes & Yeading United	Released	
30 June 2021	CM	(England)	George Hunt	(England) Slough Town	Released	
30 June 2021	CB	(England)	Corey Jordan	(England) Gloucester City	Released	
30 June 2021	CM	(Kenya)	Abdi Mohamed		Released	
30 June 2021	RM	(England)	Keelan O'Connell	(England) Torquay United	Released	
30 June 2021	CM	(Nigeria)	Nnamdi Ofoborh	(Scotland) Rangers	Compensation	
30 June 2021	LM	(England)	Frank Vincent	(England) Notts County	Released	
30 June 2021	CM	(England)	Jack Wilshere	(Denmark) AGF	Released	
9 July 2021	LW	(Bermuda)	Ajani Burchall	(England) Aston Villa	Undisclosed	
20 July 2021	GK	(Bosnia and Herzegovina)	Asmir Begović	(England) Everton	Free Transfer	
26 July 2021	LB	(Spain)	Diego Rico	(Spain) Real Sociedad	£1,000,000	
4 August 2021	RW	(England)	Jake Adams	(England) AFC Totton	Rejected contract	
4 August 2021	CF	(England)	Sam Surridge	(England) Stoke City	£5,500,000	
19 August 2021	LW	(Netherlands)	Arnaut Danjuma	(Spain) Villarreal	£21.300,000	
31 August 2021	CM	(England)	Kyle Taylor	(England) Exeter City	Undisclosed	
4 January 2022	CB	(England)	Steve Cook	(England) Nottingham Forest	Undisclosed	
31 January 2022	GK	(Norway)	Ørjan Nyland	(England) Reading	Mutual consent	

== Squad statistics ==
As of match played 7 May 2022

=== Appearances and goals ===
No.	Pos	Nat	Player	Total		Championship		FA Cup		EFL Cup	
No.	Pos	Nat	Player	Apps	Goals	Apps	Goals	Apps	Goals	Apps	Goals
1	GK	(England) ENG	Freddie Woodman	1	0	0	0	1	0	0	0
2	DF	(England) ENG	Nathaniel Phillips	18	0	17	0	1	0	0	0
3	DF	(England) ENG	Ethan Laird	7	0	4+2	0	1	0	0	0
4	MF	(England) ENG	Lewis Cook	29	1	25+3	1	1	0	0	0
5	DF	(England) ENG	Lloyd Kelly	42	1	40+1	1	0	0	1	0
6	DF	(Wales) WAL	Chris Mepham	24	0	12+10	0	1	0	0+1	0
7	MF	(Wales) WAL	David Brooks	9	3	7	1	0	0	2	2
8	MF	(Colombia) COL	Jefferson Lerma	34	1	33+1	1	0	0	0	0
9	FW	(England) ENG	Dominic Solanke	48	30	46	29	0+1	0	1	1
10	MF	(Scotland) SCO	Ryan Christie	39	3	36+2	3	0+1	0	0	0
11	MF	(Denmark) DEN	Emiliano Marcondes	21	5	8+9	2	2	3	2	0
12	MF	(Republic of Ireland) IRL	Robbie Brady	7	0	2+4	0	0+1	0	0	0
14	MF	(England) ENG	Todd Cantwell	12	0	8+3	0	0+1	0	0	0
15	DF	(England) ENG	Adam Smith	21	0	20	0	0	0	1	0
17	DF	(England) ENG	Jack Stacey	27	0	24+1	0	0+1	0	1	0
18	FW	(Jamaica) JAM	Jamal Lowe	36	7	9+25	7	2	0	0	0
19	MF	(England) ENG	Junior Stanislas	8	0	2+5	0	0	0	0+1	0
20	DF	(England) ENG	Leif Davis	15	0	7+5	0	2	0	1	0
21	FW	(Wales) WAL	Kieffer Moore	4	4	0+4	4	0	0	0	0
22	MF	(England) ENG	Ben Pearson	26	0	8+15	0	2	0	1	0
23	DF	(England) ENG	James Hill	2	0	0+1	0	1	0	0	0
24	DF	(England) ENG	Gary Cahill	22	0	21+1	0	0	0	0	0
26	MF	(Republic of Ireland) IRL	Gavin Kilkenny	18	0	13+1	0	2	0	2	0
29	MF	(Denmark) DEN	Philip Billing	42	11	37+3	10	0+1	0	1	1
32	FW	(England) ENG	Jaidon Anthony	48	8	38+7	8	2	0	1	0
33	DF	(Zimbabwe) ZIM	Jordan Zemura	34	3	32+1	3	0	0	0+1	0
37	MF	(Scotland) SCO	Siriki Dembélé	13	2	4+9	2	0	0	0	0
39	MF	(Guyana) GUY	Nathan Moriah-Welsh	2	0	0	0	2	0	0	0
40	GK	(England) ENG	Will Dennis	0	0	0	0	0	0	0	0
42	GK	(Republic of Ireland) IRL	Mark Travers	46	0	45	0	0	0	1	0
Players who have made an appearance or had a squad number this season but have left the club
1	GK	(Norway) NOR	Ørjan Nyland	3	0	1	0	1	0	1	0
3	DF	(England) ENG	Steve Cook	4	0	3	0	0	0	1	0
27	MF	(England) ENG	Morgan Rogers	17	1	1+14	1	1	0	1	0
28	MF	(England) ENG	Kyle Taylor	1	0	0	0	0	0	1	0
38	FW	(England) ENG	Christian Saydee	5	1	0+2	0	0+1	0	0+2	1
35	DF	(England) ENG	Zeno Ibsen Rossi	7	0	3+1	0	1	0	2	0
44	MF	(Scotland) SCO	Brennan Camp	1	0	0	0	0+1	0	0	0
