= 2026–27 AFC Bournemouth season =

125th season in existence of AFC Bournemouth

Bournemouth
2026–27 season
- Owner: Black Knight Football Club
- Chairman: Bill Foley
- Head coach: Marco Rose
- Stadium: Dean Court
- Premier League: 5th
- FA Cup: Third round
- EFL Cup: Quarter-finals
- UEFA Europa League: League phase
- Top goalscorer: League: Evanilson (6); All: Evanilson (8)
- Highest home attendance: 12,162 v Aston Villa, EFL Cup, 28 October 2026
- Lowest home attendance: 10,090 v Lincoln City, EFL Cup, 8 September 2026
- Average home league attendance: 11,624
- Biggest win: 4–0 v Lincoln City, EFL Cup, 8 September 2026
- Biggest defeat: 1–5 v Chelsea, Premier League, 10 October 2026
Home colours	Away colours	Third colours

The 2026–27 season is the 125th season in the history of AFC Bournemouth and the club's fifth consecutive season in the Premier League, making it their tenth season in the top flight overall. In addition to the domestic league, the club are participating in the FA Cup, the EFL Cup and the UEFA Europa League, the latter being the club's first ever participation in European competition.

== Managerial changes ==
Prior to the season starting, head coach Andoni Iraola announced he was to leave the club at the end of the 2025–26 season. Marco Rose was then shortly confirmed as Iraola's replacement on a three-year contract.

== Transfers and contracts ==
=== In ===
Date	Pos.	Player	From	Fee	Ref.
First team
14 July 2026	CF	(Uruguay) Álvaro Rodríguez	(Spain) Elche	£25,700,000	
1 August 2026	CB	(Portugal) António Silva	(Portugal) Benfica	£25,700,000	
6 August 2026	RB	(Spain) Juanlu Sánchez	(Spain) Sevilla	£11,200,000	
Academy
17 July 2026	CB	(France) Jaheim Azzouz Scafe	(England) AFC Wimbledon	Undisclosed	
25 July 2026	GK	(England) Ben Westcott	(England) Peterborough United	Free	
21 August 2026	GK	(Republic of Ireland) Adam Brogan	(England) Southampton	Undisclosed	

=== Out ===
Date	Pos.	Player	To	Fee	Ref.
First team
2 July 2026	AM	(Ivory Coast) Hamed Traorè	(France) Marseille	£6,400,000	
13 August 2026	CF	(Turkey) Enes Ünal	(Spain) Getafe	Free	
26 August 2026	GK	(England) Will Dennis	(England) Milton Keynes Dons	Undisclosed	
Academy
15 June 2026	RW	(Spain) Michael Dacosta	(Portugal) Moreirense	Free	
10 July 2026	CB	(Wales) Owen Bevan	(Scotland) Dundee	Undisclosed	
6 August 2026	LB	(Wales) Archie Harris	(England) Wigan Athletic	Undisclosed	
7 August 2026	CB	(England) Max Kinsey	(England) Truro City	Undisclosed	
27 August 2026	RB	(England) Finn Tonks	(Northern Ireland) Coleraine	Undisclosed	
8 September 2026	LW	(England) Remy Rees-Dottin	(Serbia) Čukarički	Undisclosed	

=== Loaned in ===
Date	Pos.	Player	From	Loaned until	Ref.
First team
25 August 2026	GK	(Italy) Michele Di Gregorio	(Italy) Juventus	End of season	
Academy

=== Loaned out ===
Date	Pos.	Player	To	Loaned until	Ref.
First team
3 July 2026	RM	(France) Romain Faivre	(France) Auxerre	End of season	
13 July 2026	GK	(New Zealand) Alex Paulsen	(Scotland) Motherwell	End of season	
16 July 2026	RB	(Spain) Álex Jiménez	(Italy) Fiorentina	End of season	
Academy
23 July 2026	GK	(England) Danny Dixon	(England) Winchester City	Work Experience	
7 August 2026	LB	(England) Alfie Merritt	(Wales) Newport County	End of season	
27 August 2026	CB	(United States) Matai Akinmboni	(Scotland) Dundee	End of season	

=== Released / Out of contract ===
Date	Pos.	Player	Subsequent club	Joined date	Ref.
First team
30 June 2026	CB	(Argentina) Marcos Senesi	(England) Tottenham Hotspur	1 July 2026	
Academy
30 June 2026	LB	(England) Ollie Morgan	(England) Salisbury	1 July 2026	
30 June 2026	RW	(England) Ashley Clarke	(England) Woking	1 July 2026	
30 June 2026	LB	(France) Noa Boutin	(Scotland) Inverness Caledonian Thistle	1 July 2026	
30 June 2026	CF	(England) Koby Mottoh	(Portugal) Moreirense	1 July 2026	
30 June 2026	CB	(England) James Davies	(United States) UNCA Bulldogs	2 July 2026	
30 June 2026	CB	(England) Ben Purches	(England) Sheffield United	10 July 2026	
30 June 2026	CM	(England) Charlie Osborne	(England) AFC Totton	28 August 2026	
30 June 2026	CM	(Nigeria) Malachi Ogunleye	(England) Salisbury	8 September 2026	
30 June 2026	RB	(Jamaica) Zhaviah Campbell			
30 June 2026	GK	(England) Hayden McGhan			

=== New contract ===
Date	Pos.	Player	Contract expiry	Ref.
First team
13 June 2026	CM	(Scotland) Ryan Christie	30 June 2029	
25 June 2026	GK	(England) Fraser Forster	30 June 2027	
Academy
14 May 2026	CDM	(Wales) Charlie Stevens	Undisclosed	
21 May 2026	CDM	(Ecuador) Malcom Dacosta	Undisclosed	
1 July 2026 (Note: Contract agreement was announced on 14 May, and would begin on July 1)	CB	(England) Ameer Ali	Undisclosed (Note: First professional contract)	
1 July 2026 (Note: Contract agreement was announced on 26 June, and would begin on July 1)	LW	(Georgia (country)) George Chubinidze	Undisclosed	
1 July 2026 (Note: Contract agreement was announced on 11 May, and would begin on July 1)	LB	(England) Alfie Merritt	Undisclosed	
1 July 2026 (Note: Contract agreement was announced on 28 May, and would begin on July 1)	CAM	(Ghana) Eugene Nyarko	Undisclosed	
1 July 2026	CM	(England) Ethan Sills	Undisclosed	
15 September 2026	CDM	(Wales) Charlie Stevens	Undisclosed	
21 September 2026	GK	(Republic of Ireland) Adam Brogan	Undisclosed (Note: First professional contract)	
29 September 2026	CF	(England) Nefeye Osazee	Undisclosed	

== Pre-season and friendlies ==
On 26 June, Bournemouth announced a ten-day training camp in Austria between 20–30 July, with friendlies against FC St. Pauli and FC Augsburg. Three days later, a home friendly versus Mainz 05 was confirmed. On 2 July, two further friendlies were added against Genoa and Real Betis.

Win Draw Loss Fixtures

24 July 2026 Friendly	FC St. Pauli (Germany)	1–4	(England) Bournemouth	Saalfelden, Austria
16:00 CEST	Kaars 22'	Report	Gannon-Doak 25'; William 39'; Jebbison 48'; Diakité 52'	Stadium: Saalfelden Arena

30 July 2026 Friendly	FC Augsburg (Germany)	2–5	(England) Bournemouth	Saalfelden, Austria
16:00 CEST	Claude-Maurice 72' (pen.); Schnitzer 85'	Report	Evanilson 11'; Tóth 65'; Gannon-Doak 67'; Tavernier 86'; Ünal 109'	Stadium: Saalfelden Arena

4 August 2026 Friendly	Bournemouth (England)	10–1	(Italy) Genoa	Wimborne
14:00 BST	Scott 13', 65'; Kluivert 51' (pen.), 60', 61' (pen.); Brooks 80' (pen.); Jebbison 81'; Dacosta 94'; Ünal 106', 116'	Report	Ellertsson 34'	Stadium: AFC Bournemouth Performance Centre; Attendance: 0 (Behind-closed-doors)

8 August 2026 Friendly	Real Betis (Spain)	2–2	(England) Bournemouth	Isla de La Cartuja, Spain
21:00 CEST	Hernández 57'; Fornals 81'	Report	Tavernier 41'; Evanilson 60'	Stadium: Estadio de La Cartuja; Attendance: 28,831

15 August 2026 Friendly	Mainz 05 (Germany)	2–1	(England) Bournemouth	Mainz, Germany
15:30 CEST	Becker 14'; Bøving 78'	Report	Evanilson 41'	Stadium: Mewa Arena

== Competitions ==
=== Overall record ===
Competition	First match	Last match	Starting round	Final position	Record							
Competition	First match	Last match	Starting round	Final position	Pld	W	D	L	GF	GA	GD	Win %
Premier League	23 August 2026	30 May 2027	Matchday 1	TBD	11	5	3	3	18	14	+4	45.45
FA Cup	January 2027	TBD	Third round	TBD	0	0	0	0	0	0	+0	—
EFL Cup	8 September 2026	TBD	Third round	TBD	2	2	0	0	7	0	+7	100.00
UEFA Europa League	17 September 2026	TBD	League phase	TBD	4	4	0	0	11	2	+9	100.00
Total					17	11	3	3	36	16	+20	64.71

Last updated: 21 November 2026
Source: Soccerway

=== Premier League ===
==== League table ====
Pos	Team	Pld	W	D	L	GF	GA	GD	Pts	Qualification or relegation
3	Manchester City	11	7	1	3	22	14	+8	22	Qualification for the Champions League league phase
4	Liverpool	11	6	3	2	18	10	+8	21	Qualification for the Champions League league phase
5	Bournemouth	11	5	3	3	18	14	+4	18	Qualification for the Europa League league phase (Note: The winners of the 2026–27 FA Cup and the 5th-placed team both qualify for the Europa League. If the FA Cup winners finish in the top five, the 6th-placed team will qualify. If England are one of the two associations with the highest UEFA coefficient points, 5th place will qualify for the Champions League and the other qualifying spots will move down one position.)
6	Leeds United	11	4	5	2	14	9	+5	17	
7	Everton	10	4	4	2	12	10	+2	16	

Updated to match(es) played on 22 November 2026. Source: Premier League
Rules for classification: 1) Points; 2) Goal difference; 3) Goals scored; 4) If the champions, relegated teams or qualified teams for UEFA competitions cannot be determined by rules 1 to 3 following the completion of the competition, rules 4.1 to 4.3 are applied between such teams – 4.1) Head-to-head points; 4.2) Head-to-head away goals; 4.3) Play-off at a neutral site.

==== Results summary ====
Overall								Home						Away					
Pld	W	D	L	GF	GA	GD	Pts	W	D	L	GF	GA	GD	W	D	L	GF	GA	GD
11	5	3	3	18	14	+4	18	3	2	1	9	4	+5	2	1	2	9	10	−1

Last updated: 21 November 2026.
Source: Soccerway

==== Results by round ====
Round	1	2	3	4	5	6	7	8	9	10	11	12	13	14	15	16	17	18	19	20	21	22	23	24	25	26	27	28	29	30	31	32	33	34	35	36	37	38
Ground	A	H	A	H	H	A	H	A	H	A	H	A	H	H	A	H	A	A	H	A	H	A	H	A	A	H	A	H	H	A	H	A	H	A	H	A	H	A
Result	L	D	D	D	L	L	W	W	W	W	W																											
Position	13	14	15	15	17	18	15	13	8	7																												
Points	0	1	2	3	3	3	6	9	12	15	18																											

Updated to match(es) played on 21 November 2026. Source: Premier League
A = Away; H = Home; W = Win; D = Draw; L = Loss

==== Matches ====
On 19 June 2026, the Premier League fixtures were released.

Win Draw Loss Fixtures

23 August 2026 1	Manchester City	2–1	Bournemouth	Manchester
14:00 BST	Foden (yellow card) 78'; Guéhi 84'; Gvardiol 90+1'	Report	Tavernier 26'; Evanilson (yellow card) 45+1'; Silva (yellow card) 85'	Stadium: Etihad Stadium; Attendance: 60,645; Referee: Jarred Gillett
Note: Fixture selected for live Sky Sports broadcast.

29 August 2026 2	Bournemouth	1–1	Everton	Bournemouth
15:00 BST	Scott (yellow card) 21', (goal) 41'; Smith (yellow card) 23'; Tavernier (yellow card) 53'	Report	Garner (yellow card) 59'; Tarkowski 90+1'; Alcaraz (yellow card) 90+5'	Stadium: Dean Court; Attendance: 11,135; Referee: Chris Kavanagh

5 September 2026 3	Newcastle United	2–2	Bournemouth	Newcastle upon Tyne
12:30 BST	Elanga (yellow card) 28'; Barnes 37'; Wissa (yellow card) 57'; Ramsey 88'	Report	Tavernier 9'; Thiaw 35' (o.g.); Kluivert (yellow card) 66'; Truffert (yellow card) 87'; Smith (yellow card) 90+4'	Stadium: St James' Park; Attendance: 52,643; Referee: Robert Jones
Note: Fixture was originally scheduled for a 15:00 kick-off, but was brought forward for live TNT Sports broadcast.

12 September 2026 4	Bournemouth	2–2	Brentford	Bournemouth
15:00 BST	Kluivert 38'; Tavernier (yellow card) 45+4', (goal) 52'; Hill (yellow card) 63'; Cook (yellow card) 85'; Smith (yellow card) 87'; Brooks (yellow card) 89'	Report	Schade 34', 56'; Thiago (yellow card) 45+3'	Stadium: Dean Court; Attendance: 11,183; Referee: Jarred Gillett

20 September 2026 5	Bournemouth	0–1	Liverpool	Bournemouth
14:00 BST	Silva (yellow card) 81'	Report	Szoboszlai (yellow card) 46'; Isak 57', (yellow card) 58'	Stadium: Dean Court; Attendance: 11,316; Referee: Michael Oliver
Note: Fixture was initially scheduled for 19 September, but was moved for live Sky Sports broadcast.

10 October 2026 6	Chelsea	5–1	Bournemouth	Fulham
15:00 BST	Henderson 2', 70'; Rogers 3'; João Pedro 46', 67'	Report	Tavernier (yellow card) 10'; Truffert (yellow card) 42'; Evanilson 51'; Adams (yellow card) 62'; Christie (yellow card) 69'	Stadium: Stamford Bridge; Attendance: 39,676; Referee: Sam Barrott

18 October 2026 7	Bournemouth	2–0	Sunderland	Bournemouth
14:00 BST	Tavernier 6'; Silva (yellow card) 26'; Cook (yellow card) 45+6'; Evanilson 48'; Christie (yellow card) 79'	Report	Danso (red card) 17'; Alderete (yellow card) 40'; Rigg (yellow card) 65'	Stadium: Dean Court; Attendance: 12,004; Referee: Craig Pawson
Note: Fixture was initially scheduled for 17 October, but was moved due to Bournemouth's involvement in the UEFA Europa League. Fixture also selected for live Sky Sports broadcast.

25 October 2026 8	Manchester United	0–3	Bournemouth	Trafford
14:00 GMT	Santos (yellow card) 22'; Heaven (yellow card) 37'; Tielemans (yellow card) 40'; Maguire (yellow card) 45+3'	Report	Adams (yellow card) 27'; Rayan 38'; Tavernier 43'; Evanilson 71'	Stadium: Old Trafford; Attendance: 74,142; Referee: Jarred Gillett
Note: Fixture was initially scheduled for 24 October, but was moved due to Bournemouth's involvement in the UEFA Europa League. Fixture also selected for live Sky Sports broadcast.

31 October 2026 9	Bournemouth	2–0	Leeds United	Bournemouth
15:00 GMT	Evanilson 31'; Christie (yellow card) 45+2'; Adams (yellow card) 74'; Adli 90+4'	Report	Elvedi (yellow card) 35'; Ampadu (yellow card) 62'	Stadium: Dean Court; Attendance: 12,041; Referee: Michael Salisbury

8 November 2026 10	Ipswich Town	1–2	Bournemouth	Ipswich
14:00 GMT	Enciso (yellow card) 43'; Clarke 73' (pen.); Flemming (yellow card) 90+9'	Report	Evanilson 5'; Smith (yellow card) 43'; Tavernier (yellow card) 43'; Davis 46' (o.g.); Silva (yellow card) 90+3'	Stadium: Portman Road; Attendance: 29,396; Referee: Simon Hooper
Note: Fixture was initially scheduled for 7 November, but was moved due to Bournemouth's involvement in the UEFA Europa League. Fixture also selected for live Sky Sports broadcast.

21 November 2026 11	Bournemouth	2–0	Nottingham Forest	Bournemouth
15:00 GMT	Evanilson 19'; Kluivert 45+3'; Scott (yellow card) 87'	Report	Delap (yellow card) 45'; Muñoz (yellow card) 57'; Murillo (yellow card) 90+1'	Stadium: Dean Court; Attendance: 12,067; Referee: Adam Herczeg

29 November 2026 12	Fulham	v	Bournemouth	Fulham
14:05 GMT				Stadium: Craven Cottage
Note: Fixture was initially scheduled for 28 November, but was moved due to Bournemouth's involvement in the UEFA Europa League. Fixture also selected for live Sky Sports broadcast.

2 December 2026 13	Bournemouth	v	Brighton & Hove Albion	Bournemouth
20:15 GMT				Stadium: Dean Court
Note: Fixture was originally scheduled for a 20:00 kick-off, but was pushed back for live Sky Sports broadcast.

5 December 2026 14	Bournemouth	v	Hull City	Bournemouth
15:00 GMT				Stadium: Dean Court

13 December 2026 15	Arsenal	v	Bournemouth	Holloway
14:00 GMT				Stadium: Emirates Stadium
Note: Fixture was initially scheduled for 12 December, but was moved due to Bournemouth's involvement in the UEFA Europa League. Fixture also selected for live Sky Sports broadcast.

19 December 2026 16	Bournemouth	v	Coventry City	Bournemouth
15:00 GMT				Stadium: Dean Court

26 December 2026 17	Tottenham Hotspur	v	Bournemouth	Tottenham
15:00 GMT				Stadium: Tottenham Hotspur Stadium

30 December 2026 18	Crystal Palace	v	Bournemouth	Selhurst
19:30 GMT				Stadium: Selhurst Park
Note: Fixture was initially scheduled for a 20:00 kick-off, but was brought forward for live Sky Sports broadcasting.

2 January 2027 19	Bournemouth	v	Aston Villa	Bournemouth
17:30 GMT				Stadium: Dean Court
Note: Fixture was initially scheduled for a 15:00 kick-off, but was pushed back for live Sky Sports broadcasting.

5 January 2027 20	Brighton & Hove Albion	v	Bournemouth	Brighton and Hove
19:30 GMT				Stadium: Falmer Stadium
Note: Fixture was initially scheduled for 6 January, but was brought forward a day for live Sky Sports broadcasting.

17 January 2027 21	Bournemouth	v	Ipswich Town	Bournemouth
14:00 GMT				Stadium: Dean Court
Note: Fixture was initially scheduled for 16 January, but was pushed back a day for live Sky Sports broadcasting.

24 January 2027 22	Nottingham Forest	v	Bournemouth	West Bridgford
14:00 GMT				Stadium: City Ground
Note: Fixture was initially scheduled for 23 January, but was moved due to Bournemouth's involvement in the UEFA Europa League. Fixture also selected for live Sky Sports broadcast.

31 January 2027 23	Bournemouth	v	Fulham	Bournemouth
14:00 GMT				Stadium: Dean Court
Note: Fixture was initially scheduled for 30 January, but was moved due to Bournemouth's involvement in the UEFA Europa League. Fixture also selected for live Sky Sports broadcast.

6 February 2027 24	Leeds United	v	Bournemouth	Leeds
15:00 GMT				Stadium: Elland Road

10 February 2027 25	Aston Villa	v	Bournemouth	Birmingham
20:00 GMT				Stadium: Villa Park

20 February 2027 26	Bournemouth	v	Crystal Palace	Bournemouth
15:00 GMT				Stadium: Dean Court

27 February 2027 27	Coventry City	v	Bournemouth	Coventry
15:00 GMT				Stadium: CBS Arena

3 March 2027 28	Bournemouth	v	Tottenham Hotspur	Bournemouth
20:00 GMT				Stadium: Dean Court

13 March 2027 29	Bournemouth	v	Newcastle United	Bournemouth
15:00 GMT				Stadium: Dean Court

20 March 2027 30	Brentford	v	Bournemouth	Brentford
15:00 GMT				Stadium: Gtech Community Stadium

10 April 2027 31	Bournemouth	v	Manchester City	Bournemouth
15:00 BST				Stadium: Dean Court

17 April 2027 32	Everton	v	Bournemouth	Liverpool
15:00 BST				Stadium: Hill Dickinson Stadium

24 April 2027 33	Bournemouth	v	Arsenal	Bournemouth
15:00 BST				Stadium: Dean Court

1 May 2027 34	Hull City	v	Bournemouth	Kingston upon Hull
15:00 BST				Stadium: MKM Stadium

8 May 2027 35	Bournemouth	v	Manchester United	Bournemouth
15:00 BST				Stadium: Dean Court

15 May 2027 36	Sunderland	v	Bournemouth	Sunderland
15:00 BST				Stadium: Stadium of Light

23 May 2027 37	Bournemouth	v	Chelsea	Bournemouth
15:00 BST				Stadium: Dean Court

30 May 2027 38	Liverpool	v	Bournemouth	Liverpool
16:00 BST				Stadium: Anfield

=== FA Cup ===
As a Premier League club, Bournemouth will enter the FA Cup in the third round.

Win Draw Loss Fixtures

=== EFL Cup ===
As one of the Premier League clubs involved in European competitions, Bournemouth entered the EFL Cup in the third round, being placed in pot one and drawn at home due to European fixtures being unable to be rescheduled. They were drawn against EFL Championship side Lincoln City. In the fourth round, Bournemouth were drawn at home against fellow Premier League side Aston Villa. After progressing to the quarter-finals they were drawn against another Premier League side, this time away to Liverpool.

Win Draw Loss Fixtures

8 September 2026 Third round	Bournemouth	4–0	Lincoln City	Bournemouth
19:45 BST	Christie 7', 69', 88'; Kluivert (yellow card) 41'; Silva (yellow card) 61'; Rayan 90+4'	Report	Elder (yellow card) 27'; Jefferies (yellow card) 48'; Oyegoke (yellow card) 67'	Stadium: Dean Court; Attendance: 10,090; Referee: Elliot Bell
Note: Fixture selected for live Sky Sports+ broadcast.

28 October 2026 Fourth round	Bournemouth	3–0	Aston Villa	Bournemouth
19:45 GMT	Adli 7'; Juanlu (yellow card) 16'; Gannon-Doak (yellow card) 25'; Cook 51', (yellow card) 67'; Rodríguez 69'	Report	Buendía (yellow card) 12'; Madjo (yellow card) 33'; João Gomes (yellow card) 54'	Stadium: Dean Court; Attendance: 12,162; Referee: Tony Harrington

16 December 2026 Quarter-finals	Liverpool	v	Bournemouth	Liverpool
20:00 GMT				Stadium: Anfield

=== UEFA Europa League ===
==== League phase ====
The draw for the Europa League league phase took place on 28 August 2026, with the fixture dates confirmed a day later on 29 August 2026.

Pos	Team	Pld	W	D	L	GF	GA	GD	Pts	Qualification
1	(Portugal) Benfica	4	4	0	0	13	3	+10	12	Advance to round of 16 (seeded)
2	(England) Bournemouth	4	4	0	0	11	2	+9	12	Advance to round of 16 (seeded)
3	(Hungary) Ferencváros	4	4	0	0	11	3	+8	12	Advance to round of 16 (seeded)
4	(Belgium) Union Saint-Gilloise	4	3	1	0	10	2	+8	10	Advance to round of 16 (seeded)
5	(Italy) Juventus	4	3	1	0	11	4	+7	10	Advance to round of 16 (seeded)

Updated to match(es) played on 5 November 2026. Source: UEFA
Rules for classification: League phase tiebreakers

Round	1	2	3	4	5	6	7	8
Ground	A	H	H	A	A	H	A	H
Result	W	W	W	W				
Position	10	5	3	2				
Points	3	6	9	12				

Updated to match(es) played on 5 November 2026. Source: UEFA
A = Away; H = Home; W = Win; D = Draw; L = Loss

Win Draw Loss Fixtures

17 September 2026 1	Real Sociedad (Spain)	1–2	(England) Bournemouth	San Sebastián, Spain
21:00 CEST	Turrientes (yellow card) 24'; Barrenetxea (yellow card) 33'; Gómez 57'; Óskarsson (yellow card) 75'	Report	Kluivert 11', (yellow card) 43'; Rayan 20'; Truffert (yellow card) 52'; Diakité (yellow card) 70'	Stadium: Anoeta; Attendance: 30,020; Referee: Paweł Raczkowski (Poland)

15 October 2026 2	Bournemouth (England)	3–0	(Austria) Sturm Graz	Bournemouth, England
20:00 BST	Evanilson (yellow card) 15', (goal) 43'; Diakité (yellow card) 58'; Soler (yellow card) 66'; Rayan 76'; Rodríguez 90+2' (pen.)	Report	Beganović (yellow card) 41'; Halwachs (yellow card) 85'; Vallçi (yellow card) 87'	Stadium: Dean Court; Attendance: 12,070; Referee: Jérôme Brisard (France)

22 October 2026 3	Bournemouth (England)	3–0	(Italy) Milan	Bournemouth, England
20:00 BST	Kluivert 8' (pen.); Diakité (yellow card) 16'; Adams (yellow card) 29'; Tavernier 32' (pen.); Adli 84'	Report	Maignan (red card) 28'; Estupiñán (yellow card) 35'; Tomori (yellow card) 63'; De Winter (yellow card) 81'	Stadium: Dean Court; Attendance: 12,130; Referee: Vasilios Fotias (Greece)

5 November 2026 4	Sparta Prague (Czech Republic)	1–3	(England) Bournemouth	Prague, Czech Republic
18:45 CET	Guddal (yellow card) 6' (yellow-red card) 37'; Hoever (yellow card) 30'; Singhateh 35'; Jurásek (yellow card) 84'	Report	Christie (yellow card) 20'; Cook (penalty missed) 30'; Adli (yellow card) 56'; Adams 57'; Evanilson 81'; Rayan 90'	Stadium: Stadion Letná; Attendance: 17,377; Referee: Erik Lambrechts (Belgium)

26 November 2026 5	Celta Vigo (Spain)	v	(England) Bournemouth	Vigo, Spain
18:45 CET		Report		Stadium: Balaídos

10 December 2026 6	Bournemouth (England)	v	(Czech Republic) Viktoria Plzeň	Bournemouth, England
20:00 GMT		Report		Stadium: Dean Court

21 January 2027 7	Lillestrøm (Norway)	v	(England) Bournemouth	Lillestrøm, Norway
18:45 CET		Report		Stadium: Åråsen Stadion

28 January 2027 8	Bournemouth (England)	v	(Israel) Hapoel Be'er Sheva	Bournemouth, England
20:00 GMT		Report		Stadium: Dean Court

== Statistics ==
=== Appearances and goals ===
As of 21 November 2026

Players with no appearances are not included on the list, Italics indicate a loaned in player

No.	Pos	Nat	Player	Total		Premier League		FA Cup		EFL Cup		UEFA Europa League	
No.	Pos	Nat	Player	Apps	Goals	Apps	Goals	Apps	Goals	Apps	Goals	Apps	Goals
1	GK	(Serbia) SRB	Đorđe Petrović	13	0	11	0	0	0	0	0	2	0
3	DF	(France) FRA	Adrien Truffert	14	0	11	0	0	0	0	0	2+1	0
4	MF	(England) ENG	Lewis Cook	16	1	4+7	0	0	0	2	1	2+1	0
5	DF	(England) ENG	James Hill	16	0	11	0	0	0	1	0	3+1	0
6	DF	(Argentina) ARG	Julio Soler	5	0	0+1	0	0	0	2	0	2	0
7	MF	(Wales) WAL	David Brooks	9	0	1+4	0	0	0	1+1	0	1+1	0
8	MF	(England) ENG	Alex Scott	7	1	5+1	1	0	0	0	0	1	0
9	FW	(Brazil) BRA	Evanilson	15	8	11	6	0	0	0	0	3+1	2
10	MF	(Scotland) SCO	Ryan Christie	16	3	6+4	0	0	0	2	3	2+2	0
11	FW	(Scotland) SCO	Ben Gannon-Doak	14	0	0+8	0	0	0	2	0	3+1	0
12	MF	(United States) USA	Tyler Adams	16	1	9+2	0	0	0	0+1	0	3+1	1
14	DF	(Portugal) POR	António Silva	16	0	11	0	0	0	2	0	3	0
15	DF	(England) ENG	Adam Smith	14	0	11	0	0	0	0	0	3	0
16	MF	(England) ENG	Marcus Tavernier	17	6	11	5	0	0	1+1	0	3+1	1
18	DF	(France) FRA	Bafodé Diakité	11	0	0+5	0	0	0	2	0	3+1	0
19	FW	(Netherlands) NED	Justin Kluivert	14	4	8+1	2	0	0	1+1	0	2+1	2
20	GK	(Italy) ITA	Michele Di Gregorio	4	0	0	0	0	0	2	0	2	0
21	MF	(Morocco) MAR	Amine Adli	8	3	0+4	1	0	0	1	1	1+2	1
22	FW	(France) FRA	Eli Junior Kroupi	5	0	0+4	0	0	0	0+1	0	0	0
24	DF	(Spain) ESP	Juanlu Sánchez	3	0	0+1	0	0	0	1+1	0	0	0
27	MF	(Hungary) HUN	Alex Tóth	4	0	0+2	0	0	0	0+1	0	0+1	0
29	FW	(Canada) CAN	Daniel Jebbison	4	0	0+3	0	0	0	0+1	0	0	0
30	FW	(Uruguay) URU	Álvaro Rodríguez	12	2	0+6	0	0	0	2	1	2+2	1
37	FW	(Brazil) BRA	Rayan	17	5	11	1	0	0	0+2	1	1+3	3

== Awards and nominations ==
=== Player Awards ===
==== Premier League Save of the Month ====
Month	Pos.	Player	Opposition	Result	Ref.
August	GK	(Serbia) Đorđe Petrović	v. Everton	Nominated	

==== Premier League Player of the Month ====
Month	Pos.	Player	Result	Ref.
October	FW	(Brazil) Evanilson	Nominated	

==== Premier League Goal of the Month ====
Month	Pos.	Player	Opposition	Result	Ref.
October	FW	(Brazil) Evanilson	v. Manchester United	Nominated	

=== Manager Awards ===
==== Premier League Manager of the Month ====
Month	Manager	Result	Ref.
October	(Germany) Marco Rose	Nominated	
