= Adam Smith (footballer, born 1991) =

English footballer (born 1991)

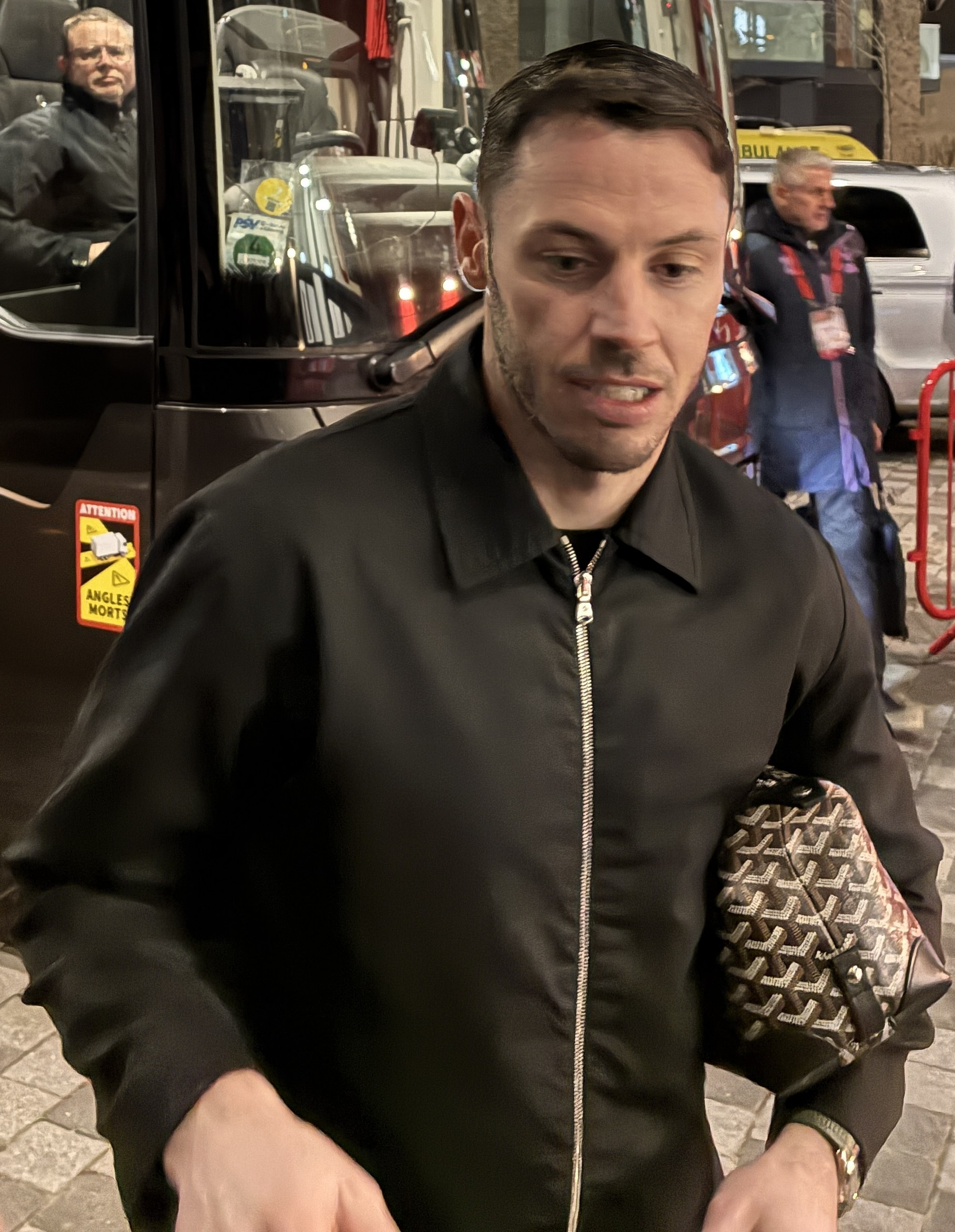
- Smith in 2025

Personal information
- Full name: Adam James Smith
- Date of birth: 29 April 1991 (age 35)
- Place of birth: Leytonstone, London, England
- Height: 5 ft 11 in (1.80 m)
- Position: Full-back

Team information
- Current team: Bournemouth
- Number: 15

Youth career
- 2007–2009: Tottenham Hotspur

Senior career*
Years	Team	Apps	(Gls)
2009–2014	Tottenham Hotspur	1	(0)
2009	→ Wycombe Wanderers (loan)	3	(0)
2009–2010	→ Torquay United (loan)	16	(0)
2010–2011	→ Bournemouth (loan)	38	(1)
2011–2012	→ Milton Keynes Dons (loan)	17	(2)
2012	→ Leeds United (loan)	3	(0)
2012–2013	→ Millwall (loan)	25	(1)
2013	→ Derby County (loan)	8	(0)
2014–	Bournemouth	355	(5)

International career
2006–2007	England U16	3	(0)
2006–2008	England U17	3	(0)
2009	England U19	1	(0)
2011	England U20	5	(0)
2011–2013	England U21	11	(0)
- * Club domestic league appearances and goals as of 23:06, 20 September 2026 (UTC)

Adam James Smith (born 29 April 1991) is an English professional footballer who plays as a full-back for and captains Premier League club Bournemouth. He has also represented England at under-21 level.

== Club career ==
=== Tottenham Hotspur and loan moves ===
Smith is a product of the Tottenham Hotspur youth academy.

In August 2009, Smith joined Wycombe Wanderers on a short-term loan as cover for two injured right backs, making his Football League debut away against Charlton Athletic on 8 August 2009. After a short loan spell at Wycombe Wanderers, which ended on 5 September 2009, he was selected to represent the England Under 19s in the 2010 European qualifications in Slovenia. Smith made his England debut and played 90 minutes in the final group game against Slovakia, which England won 2–0.

In November 2009, Smith joined League Two side Torquay United on loan until January 2010.

On 23 September 2010, Smith joined Bournemouth on a month loan deal. He started his spell against Carlisle United in a game in which he won a sixty-fourth-minute penalty, which new teammate Michael Symes scored. The game finished 2–0 to Bournemouth and left them third in the table.

Smith was then part of the Bournemouth side who lost 2–0 at Southampton. The youngster was sent off late on following two bookable offences. He missed the trip to Brighton & Hove Albion but returned for Bournemouth's 3–2 win against Milton Keynes Dons, maintaining his 100% win ratio. This run was brought to an end when Smith played in a 2–1 defeat against Colchester United at Dean Court on 30 October 2010. On 1 April, Smith scored his first goal for Bournemouth an equaliser in the 94th minute against Peterborough United at London Road helping the Cherries come back from 3–1 down with 20 minutes to go after Steve Fletcher's bullet header made the score 3–2.

In August 2011 it was announced that Smith had joined MK Dons on a season-long loan deal. On 5 November, he got his first goal for the club against Rochdale scoring from distance. At the end of January 2012, Smith was recalled from his loan spell at Milton Keynes Dons.

He signed for Leeds United on 31 January 2012 for a season long loan. He proved to be manager Simon Grayson's last signing as Grayson was sacked the following day. Smith made his debut in Leeds 3–0 win against Bristol City on 4 February. In February Tottenham recalled Smith to provide First Team cover after first-choice right back Kyle Walker had picked up an injury. On 13 May 2012, Smith made his Premier League debut after replacing Younès Kaboul in the 76th minute of Tottenham's 2–0 win over Fulham.

On the first day of November after making just one appearance in the League Cup, Smith joined Millwall on a three-month loan deal. Following a successful stay with 18 appearances and a winning goal, Millwall announced on deadline day that they had extended the loan deal to the end of the season.

On 29 July 2013, Smith joined Derby County on a season-long loan as a replacement for John Brayford who had left the club for Cardiff City. Smith made his debut in Derby's 1–0 first round League Cup win at Oldham Athletic on 6 August. He played again in a 5–0 second round League Cup win against Brentford on 27 August but he had to wait five matches for his league debut, which came as a half time substitute for fellow right-back Kieron Freeman in Derby's 3–0 loss at home to Burnley on 31 August. He started all of Derby's next seven league matches, though he was withdrawn after 61 minutes in the first, a 5–1 victory at Millwall, out of concerns for his safety. Millwall were 3–0 down and playing with 10 men and Smith was struck by bottles and coins thrown by the home fans so he was replaced by Freeman. After losing his place in the team to Liverpool loanee Andre Wisdom, Smith's loan spell was terminated by mutual consent on 30 November 2013 and he returned to Tottenham.

=== Bournemouth ===
On 28 January 2014, Smith re-joined Bournemouth this time on a permanent basis signing a three-and-a-half-year deal. On 19 December 2015, he scored his first goal in the Premier League in a 2–1 away win against West Bromwich Albion. On 25 July 2017, he signed a new four-year contract until 2021.

On 3 September 2024, Smith became captain of Bournemouth following the departure of Neto to Arsenal. On 12 September 2024, he signed a new one-year contract extension until 2026. On 12 February 2026, he signed a further one-year contract extension until 2027.

Due to controversy surrounding fellow right-back Álex Jiménez, Smith started and played the full ninety minutes away at Fulham on 9 May 2026, and kept a clean sheet despite having just a day's notice. He then went on to start the final two games of the season, keeping a clean sheet at home against Manchester City on 19 May, where Erling Haaland's late equaliser happened only once he had been substituted off, and also playing away against Nottingham Forest on 24 May, where he made a crucial block to deny Morgan Gibbs-White a potential winner late into the match. These performances resulted in a record sixth-placed finish and a record points tally of 57 for the club in the Premier League, qualifying them for the 2026-27 UEFA Europa League. As a result, Adam Smith has seen the club from the EFL League Two on a loan-spell all the way to their first European tournament.

== International career ==
Smith has represented England at various youth team levels.

== Career statistics ==
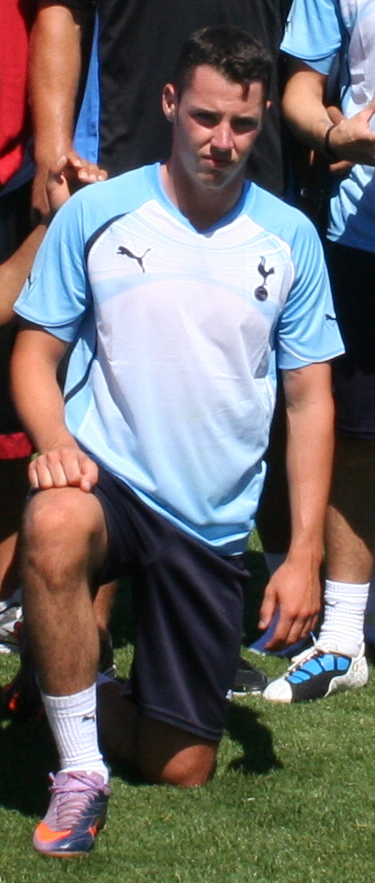
Smith in the July 2010 USA tour with Tottenham Hotspur.

As of match played 20 September 2026

Appearances and goals by club, season and competition
Club	Season	League			FA Cup		League Cup		Europe		Other		Total	
Club	Season	Division	Apps	Goals	Apps	Goals	Apps	Goals	Apps	Goals	Apps	Goals	Apps	Goals
Tottenham Hotspur	2009–10	Premier League	0	0	—		0	0	—		—		0	0
Tottenham Hotspur	2010–11	Premier League	0	0	—		0	0	0	0	—		0	0
Tottenham Hotspur	2011–12	Premier League	1	0	—		—		—		—		1	0
Tottenham Hotspur	2012–13	Premier League	0	0	—		1	0	0	0	—		1	0
Tottenham Hotspur	2013–14	Premier League	0	0	0	0	—		0	0	—		0	0
Tottenham Hotspur	Total		1	0	0	0	1	0	0	0	—		2	0
Wycombe Wanderers (loan)	2009–10	League One	3	0	—		0	0	—		1 (Note: Appearance in Football League Trophy)	0	4	0
Torquay United (loan)	2009–10	League Two	16	0	2	0	—		—		—		18	0
Bournemouth (loan)	2010–11	League One	38	1	2	0	—		—		2 (Note: Appearances in League One play-offs)	0	42	1
Milton Keynes Dons (loan)	2011–12	League One	17	2	3	0	1	0	—		1	0	22	2
Leeds United (loan)	2011–12	Championship	3	0	—		—		—		—		3	0
Millwall (loan)	2012–13	Championship	25	1	3	0	—		—		—		28	1
Derby County (loan)	2013–14	Championship	8	0	—		2	0	—		—		10	0
Bournemouth	2013–14	Championship	5	0	—		—		—		—		5	0
Bournemouth	2014–15	Championship	29	0	2	0	5	0	—		—		36	0
Bournemouth	2015–16	Premier League	31	2	2	0	3	0	—		—		36	2
Bournemouth	2016–17	Premier League	36	1	0	0	0	0	—		—		36	1
Bournemouth	2017–18	Premier League	27	1	1	0	4	0	—		—		32	1
Bournemouth	2018–19	Premier League	25	1	0	0	1	0	—		—		26	1
Bournemouth	2019–20	Premier League	24	0	0	0	1	0	—		—		25	0
Bournemouth	2020–21	Championship	41	0	2	0	1	0	—		2 (Note: Appearances in Championship play-offs)	0	46	0
Bournemouth	2021–22	Championship	20	0	0	0	1	0	—		—		21	0
Bournemouth	2022–23	Premier League	37	0	1	0	1	0	—		—		39	0
Bournemouth	2023–24	Premier League	28	0	1	0	2	0	—		—		31	0
Bournemouth	2024–25	Premier League	25	0	1	0	1	0	—		—		27	0
Bournemouth	2025–26	Premier League	22	0	1	0	0	0	—		—		23	0
Bournemouth	2026–27	Premier League	5	0	0	0	0	0	1 (Note: Appearances in UEFA Europa League)	0	—		6	0
Bournemouth	Total		355	5	11	0	20	0	1	0	2	0	389	5
Career total			466	9	21	0	24	0	1	0	6	0	518	9

== Honours ==
Bournemouth

- Football League Championship: 2014–15
