= 2025–26 AFC Bournemouth season =

124th season in existence of AFC Bournemouth

Bournemouth
2025–26 season
- Owner: Black Knight Football Club
- Chairman: Bill Foley
- Head coach: Andoni Iraola
- Stadium: Dean Court
- Premier League: 6th
- FA Cup: Third round
- EFL Cup: Second round
- Top goalscorer: League: Eli Junior Kroupi (13); All: Eli Junior Kroupi (13)
- Highest home attendance: 11,260 v Liverpool, Premier League, 24 January 2026
- Lowest home attendance: 10,499 v Brentford, EFL Cup, 26 August 2025
- Average home league attendance: 11,175
- Biggest win: 3–0 v Crystal Palace, Premier League, 3 May 2026
- Biggest defeat: 0–4 v Aston Villa, Premier League, 9 November 2025
| Home colours | Away colours | Third colours |

The 2025–26 season was the 124th season in the history of AFC Bournemouth and the club's fourth consecutive season in the Premier League, making it their ninth season in the top flight overall. In addition to the domestic league, the club also participated in the FA Cup and the EFL Cup.

== Transfers ==
=== In ===
| Date | Pos. | Player | From | Fee | Ref. |
|---|---|---|---|---|---|
| 16 June 2025 | LB | (France) Adrien Truffert | (France) Rennes | £14,400,000 | |
| 16 July 2025 | GK | (Serbia) Đorđe Petrović | (England) Chelsea | £25,000,000 | |
| 13 August 2025 | CB | (France) Bafodé Diakité | (France) Lille | £34,600,000 | |
| 18 August 2025 | RW | (Scotland) Ben Gannon-Doak | (England) Liverpool | £25,000,000 | |
| 21 August 2025 | LW | (Morocco) Amine Adli | (Germany) Bayer Leverkusen | £25,100,000 | |
| 1 September 2025 | CB | (Serbia) Veljko Milosavljević | (Serbia) Red Star Belgrade | £13,000,000 | |
| 2 January 2026 | GK | (England) Fraser Forster | (England) Tottenham Hotspur | Free | |
| 15 January 2026 | LB | (Republic of Ireland) Ade Solanke (Note: Signed initially for the Under-21s) | (France) Lorient | Undisclosed | |
| 20 January 2026 | CM | (Hungary) Alex Tóth | (Hungary) Ferencváros | £10,400,000 | |
| 27 January 2026 | CF | (Brazil) Rayan | (Brazil) Vasco da Gama | £24,700,000 | |
| 12 February 2026 | RB | (Spain) Álex Jiménez | (Italy) AC Milan | £16,500,000 (Note: Permanent transfer was completed after appearance threshold was met that was required to activate transfer clause following initial loan) | |

=== Out ===
| Date | Pos. | Player | To | Fee | Ref. |
|---|---|---|---|---|---|
| 1 June 2025 (Note: The transfer was announced on 17 May, and would become official on 1 June once the transfer window re-opened.) | CB | (Spain) Dean Huijsen | (Spain) Real Madrid | £50,000,000 | |
| 1 June 2025 (Note: The transfer was announced on 20 May, and would become official on 1 June once the transfer window re-opened.) | LW | (England) Jaidon Anthony | (England) Burnley | £8,000,000 | |
| 26 June 2025 | LB | (Hungary) Milos Kerkez | (England) Liverpool | £40,000,000 | |
| 2 July 2025 | CM | (England) Joe Rothwell | (Scotland) Rangers | £400,000 | |
| 15 July 2025 | GK | (Republic of Ireland) Mark Travers | (England) Everton | £4,000,000 | |
| 8 August 2025 | GK | (Brazil) Neto | (Brazil) Botafogo | Free | |
| 12 August 2025 | CB | (Ukraine) Illia Zabarnyi | (France) Paris Saint-Germain | £54,500,000 | |
| 16 August 2025 | RW | (Burkina Faso) Dango Ouattara | (England) Brentford | £42,500,000 | |
| 26 August 2025 | CF | (England) Daniel Adu-Adjei | (Croatia) Rijeka | £1,200,000 | |
| 26 August 2025 | CM | (Denmark) Philip Billing | (Denmark) Midtjylland | £5,000,000 | |
| 28 August 2025 | CB | (Wales) Chris Mepham | (England) West Bromwich Albion | £1,000,000 | |
| 10 September 2025 | LW | (England) Zain Silcott-Duberry | (Greece) Olympiacos | Undisclosed | |
| 9 January 2026 | RW | (Ghana) Antoine Semenyo | (England) Manchester City | £64,000,000 | |
| 7 February 2026 | AM | (England) Balraj Landa | (England) Salisbury | Free | |
| 14 February 2026 | LW | (England) Dominic Sadi | (Serbia) Novi Pazar | Undisclosed | |
| 30 May 2026 | LW | (Colombia) Luis Sinisterra | (Brazil) Cruzeiro | £5,200,000 | |

=== Loaned in ===
| Date | Pos. | Player | From | Date until | Ref. |
|---|---|---|---|---|---|
| 1 September 2025 | RB | (Spain) Álex Jiménez | (Italy) AC Milan | 12 February 2026 (Note: Signed permanently on 12 February, after appearance threshold was met that was required to activate transfer clause following initial loan) | |
| 27 January 2026 | GK | (Greece) Christos Mandas | (Italy) Lazio | End of season | |

=== Loaned out ===
| Date | Pos. | Player | To | Date until | Ref. |
|---|---|---|---|---|---|
| 25 June 2025 | RB | (England) Max Aarons | (Scotland) Rangers | End of season | |
| 1 July 2025 | CF | (England) Jonny Stuttle | (England) Walsall | 22 August 2025 (Note: Loan was terminated early due to injury) | |
| 7 July 2025 (Note: The loan was announced on 21 June, and would become official on 7 July once the 2025 CONCACAF Gold Cup has concluded.) | CF | (Canada) Daniel Jebbison | (England) Preston North End | End of season | |
| 8 July 2025 | LB | (Wales) Archie Harris | (England) Eastleigh | End of season | |
| 10 July 2025 | CB | (England) Max Kinsey | (England) Truro City | End of season | |
| 19 July 2025 | GK | (England) Danny Dixon | (England) New Milton Town | Work Experience | |
| 19 July 2025 | GK | (England) Will Upstell | (England) New Milton Town | Work Experience | |
| 23 July 2025 | GK | (England) Mack Allan | (England) Plymouth Parkway | End of season | |
| 1 August 2025 | CF | (England) Ash Clarke | (England) AFC Totton | End of season | |
| 15 August 2025 | CM | (England) Karlos Gregory | (England) Sholing | End of season | |
| 22 August 2025 | LW | (Colombia) Luis Sinisterra | (Brazil) Cruzeiro | 30 May 2026 (Note: On 30 May, Sinisterra joined Cruzeiro on a permanent basis) | |
| 25 August 2025 | GK | (New Zealand) Alex Paulsen | (Poland) Lechia Gdańsk | End of season | |
| 29 August 2025 | AM | (Ivory Coast) Hamed Traorè | (France) Marseille | End of season | |
| 30 August 2025 | LB | (France) Noa Boutin | (England) Sutton United | 4 January 2026 (Note: On 4 January, Boutin was recalled from his season-long loan at Sutton United) | |
| 1 September 2025 | DM | (England) Ben Winterburn | (England) Barnet | End of season | |
| 10 September 2025 | RM | (France) Romain Faivre | (Saudi Arabia) Al Taawoun | 15 January 2026 (Note: On 15 January, Faivre was recalled from his season-long loan at Al Taawoun) | |
| 17 September 2025 | LW | (England) Dominic Sadi | (Serbia) Novi Pazar | 12 January 2026 (Note: On 12 January, Sadi was recalled from his season-long loan at Novi Pazar) | |
| 26 September 2025 | LW | (Spain) Michael Dacosta | (England) Hartlepool United | 27 October 2025 | |
| 27 September 2025 | LB | (England) Ollie Morgan | (England) Salisbury | End of season | |
| 14 November 2025 | GK | (England) Kai Crampton | (England) Wimborne Town | 13 December 2025 | |
| 21 November 2025 | CM | (Nigeria) Malachi Ogunleye | (England) Salisbury | Work Experience | |
| 12 December 2025 | CM | (England) Charlie Osborne | (England) AFC Totton | 27 March 2026 (Note: On 27 March, Osborne was recalled from his half-season loan at AFC Totton and subsequently joined Torquay United on loan) | |
| 2 January 2026 | RB | (Mexico) Julián Araujo | (Scotland) Celtic | End of season | |
| 15 January 2026 | RM | (France) Romain Faivre | (France) Auxerre | End of season | |
| 2 February 2026 | GK | (England) Will Dennis | (England) Leyton Orient | End of season | |
| 21 February 2026 | LB | (England) Alfie Merritt | (England) AFC Totton | End of season | |
| 28 February 2026 | LW | (Georgia (country)) George Chubinidze | (England) Dorchester Town | Work Experience | |
| 27 March 2026 | CM | (England) Charlie Osborne | (England) Torquay United | End of season | |

=== Released / Out of contract ===
| Date | Pos. | Player | Subsequent club | Join date | Ref. |
|---|---|---|---|---|---|
| 30 June 2025 | CM | (England) Toure Williams | (England) Bashley | 2 August 2025 | |
| 30 June 2025 | DM | (England) Lewis Brown | (England) Havant & Waterlooville | 8 August 2025 | |
| 30 June 2025 | AM | (Republic of Ireland) Kian Tydeman | (England) Shrewton United | Summer 2025 | |
| 30 June 2025 | CB | (England) Coby Small | Currently unattached | | |

== Pre-season and friendlies ==
On 10 June, Bournemouth announced their pre-season schedule, with friendlies against Hibernian, Bristol City, Everton, Manchester United, West Ham United, and two same day friendlies against Real Sociedad.

Win Draw Loss Fixtures

| 15 July 2025 Friendly | Bournemouth (England) | 2–1 | (Scotland) Hibernian | Wimborne |
| 12:00 BST | Billing; Faivre | Report | Bowie | Stadium: AFC Bournemouth Performance Centre; Attendance: 0 (Behind-closed-doors) |

| 19 July 2025 Friendly | Bournemouth | 6–2 | Bristol City | Wimborne |
| 13:00 BST | Tavernier; Truffert; Semenyo; Evanilson; Ouattara | Report | Yeboah; McCrorie | Stadium: AFC Bournemouth Performance Centre; Attendance: 0 (Behind-closed-doors) |

| 26 July 2025 Summer Series | Everton | 0–3 | Bournemouth | East Rutherford, United States |
| 16:00 EDT | Garner (yellow card) 27'; Mykolenko (yellow card) 67' | Report | Billing 55'; Ouattara 59'; Adu-Adjei 69'; Mepham (yellow card) 85' | Stadium: MetLife Stadium; Attendance: 10,000; Referee: Guido Gonzales Jr. |

| 30 July 2025 Summer Series | Manchester United | 4–1 | Bournemouth | Chicago, United States |
| 20:30 CDT | Højlund 8'; Dorgu 25'; Diallo 53'; Williams 72' | Report | de Ligt 88' (o.g.) | Stadium: Soldier Field; Attendance: 58,927; Referee: Lewis Smith |

| 3 August 2025 Summer Series | Bournemouth | 0–2 | West Ham United | Atlanta, United States |
| 14:00 EDT | Araujo (yellow card) 77' | Report | Füllkrug 24'; Potts (yellow card) 57'; Bowen 67'; Mavropanos (yellow card) 87' | Stadium: Mercedes-Benz Stadium; Referee: Victor Rivas |

| 9 August 2025 Friendly | Bournemouth (England) | 1–1 | (Spain) Real Sociedad | Wimborne |
| 10:15 BST | Evanilson 9' | Report | Barrenetxea 89' | Stadium: AFC Bournemouth Performance Centre; Attendance: 0 (Behind-closed-doors) |

| 9 August 2025 Friendly | Bournemouth (England) | 0–0 | (Spain) Real Sociedad | Bournemouth |
| 17:15 BST | | Report | Oyarzabal (penalty missed) 45+3' | Stadium: Dean Court |

== Competitions ==
=== Overall record ===
| Competition | First match | Last match | Starting round | Final position | Record | | | | | | | |
| Competition | First match | Last match | Starting round | Final position | Pld | W | D | L | GF | GA | GD | Win % |
|---|---|---|---|---|---|---|---|---|---|---|---|---|
| Premier League | 15 August 2025 | 24 May 2026 | Matchday 1 | 6th | 38 | 13 | 18 | 7 | 58 | 54 | +4 | 34.21 |
| FA Cup | 10 January 2026 | | Third round | Third round | 1 | 0 | 1 | 0 | 3 | 3 | +0 | 0.00 |
| EFL Cup | 26 August 2025 | | Second round | Second round | 1 | 0 | 0 | 1 | 0 | 2 | −2 | 0.00 |
| Total | | | | | 40 | 13 | 19 | 8 | 61 | 59 | +2 | 32.50 |

Source: Soccerway

=== Premier League ===
==== League table ====
| Pos | Team | Pld | W | D | L | GF | GA | GD | Pts | Qualification or relegation |
|---|---|---|---|---|---|---|---|---|---|---|
| 4 | Aston Villa | 38 | 19 | 8 | 11 | 56 | 49 | +7 | 65 | Qualification for the Champions League league phase (Note: The Premier League gained an additional Champions League place as a result of England gaining one of the two European Performance Spots (EPS) awarded to the two associations with the highest UEFA coefficient points in 2025–26.) |
| 5 | Liverpool | 38 | 17 | 9 | 12 | 63 | 53 | +10 | 60 | Qualification for the Champions League league phase |
| 6 | Bournemouth | 38 | 13 | 18 | 7 | 58 | 54 | +4 | 57 | Qualification for the Europa League league phase (Note: Since the winners of the 2025–26 FA Cup and 2025–26 EFL Cup, Manchester City, qualified for the Champions League by league position, the spot reserved for the FA Cup winners (Europa League league phase) was passed to the seventh-placed team, and the spot reserved for the EFL Cup winners (Conference League play-off round) was passed to the eighth-placed team.) |
| 7 | Sunderland | 38 | 14 | 12 | 12 | 42 | 48 | −6 | 54 | Qualification for the Europa League league phase |
| 8 | Brighton & Hove Albion | 38 | 14 | 11 | 13 | 52 | 46 | +6 | 53 | Qualification for the Conference League play-off round |

Source: Premier League
Rules for classification: 1) Points; 2) Goal difference; 3) Goals scored; 4) If the champions, relegated teams or qualified teams for UEFA competitions cannot be determined by rules 1 to 3, rules 4.1 to 4.3 are applied – 4.1) Points gained in head-to-head record between such teams; 4.2) Away goals scored in head-to-head record between such teams; 4.3) Play-offs

==== Results summary ====
| Overall | | | | | | | | Home | | | | | | Away | | | | | |
| Pld | W | D | L | GF | GA | GD | Pts | W | D | L | GF | GA | GD | W | D | L | GF | GA | GD |
|---|---|---|---|---|---|---|---|---|---|---|---|---|---|---|---|---|---|---|---|
| 38 | 13 | 18 | 7 | 58 | 54 | +4 | 57 | 7 | 10 | 2 | 29 | 20 | +9 | 6 | 8 | 5 | 29 | 34 | −5 |

Source: Soccerway

==== Results by round ====
| Round | 1 | 2 | 3 | 4 | 5 | 6 | 7 | 8 | 9 | 10 | 11 | 12 | 13 | 14 | 15 | 16 | 17 | 18 | 19 | 20 | 21 | 22 | 23 | 24 | 25 | 26 | 27 | 28 | 29 | 30 | 31 | 32 | 33 | 34 | 35 | 36 | 37 | 38 |
|---|---|---|---|---|---|---|---|---|---|---|---|---|---|---|---|---|---|---|---|---|---|---|---|---|---|---|---|---|---|---|---|---|---|---|---|---|---|---|
| Ground | A | H | A | H | H | A | H | A | H | A | A | H | A | H | H | A | H | A | A | H | H | A | H | A | H | A | A | H | H | A | H | A | A | H | H | A | H | A |
| Result | L | W | W | W | D | D | W | D | W | L | L | D | L | L | D | D | D | L | D | L | W | D | W | W | D | W | D | D | D | D | D | W | W | D | W | W | D | D |
| Position | 16 | 9 | 7 | 4 | 4 | 6 | 4 | 3 | 2 | 5 | 9 | 8 | 11 | 14 | 13 | 13 | 15 | 15 | 15 | 15 | 15 | 15 | 13 | 12 | 11 | 9 | 8 | 10 | 9 | 10 | 13 | 11 | 8 | 7 | 6 | 6 | 6 | 6 |
| Points | 0 | 3 | 6 | 9 | 10 | 11 | 14 | 15 | 18 | 18 | 18 | 19 | 19 | 19 | 20 | 21 | 22 | 22 | 23 | 23 | 26 | 27 | 30 | 33 | 34 | 37 | 38 | 39 | 40 | 41 | 42 | 45 | 48 | 49 | 52 | 55 | 56 | 57 |

Source: Premier League
A = Away; H = Home; W = Win; D = Draw; L = Loss

==== Matches ====
On 18 June 2025, the Premier League fixtures were released.

Win Draw Loss Fixtures

| 15 August 2025 1 | Liverpool | 4–2 | Bournemouth | Liverpool |
| 20:00 BST | Ekitike 37'; Kerkez (yellow card) 43'; Gakpo 49'; Chiesa 88'; Salah 90+4' | Report | Brooks (yellow card) 14'; Semenyo 64', 76'; Evanilson (yellow card) 81' | Stadium: Anfield; Attendance: 60,315; Referee: Anthony Taylor |

| 23 August 2025 2 | Bournemouth | 1–0 | Wolverhampton Wanderers | Bournemouth |
| 15:00 BST | Tavernier 4'; Adams (yellow card) 58'; Scott (yellow card) 63' | Report | Toti (yellow card) 9', (red card) 49'; H. Bueno (yellow card) 63'; Doherty (yellow card) 84'; João Gomes (yellow card) 85' | Stadium: Dean Court; Attendance: 11,070; Referee: Thomas Bramall |

| 30 August 2025 3 | Tottenham Hotspur | 0–1 | Bournemouth | Tottenham |
| 15:00 BST | Van de Ven (yellow card) 14'; Spence (yellow card) 65' | Report | Evanilson 5'; Semenyo (yellow card) 12'; Petrović (yellow card) 72'; Adams (yellow card) 88'; Hill (yellow card) 90+7' | Stadium: Tottenham Hotspur Stadium; Attendance: 61,250; Referee: Simon Hooper |

| 13 September 2025 4 | Bournemouth | 2–1 | Brighton & Hove Albion | Bournemouth |
| 15:00 BST | Scott 18'; Brooks (yellow card) 31'; Senesi (yellow card) 36'; Adams (yellow card) 45+5'; Semenyo 61' (pen.); Jiménez (yellow card) 90+6' | Report | Dunk (yellow card) 30'; Mitoma 48'; Rutter (yellow card) 57'; Milner (yellow card) 63'; Baleba (yellow card) 73' | Stadium: Dean Court; Attendance: 11,167; Referee: Peter Bankes |

| 21 September 2025 5 | Bournemouth | 0–0 | Newcastle United | Bournemouth |
| 14:00 BST | Jiménez (yellow card) 45+3'; Diakité (yellow card) 74' | Report | Thiaw (yellow card) 77' | Stadium: Dean Court; Attendance: 11,212; Referee: Robert Jones |
Note: Fixture was initially scheduled for 20 September, but was moved due to Newcastle United's involvement in the UEFA Champions League.

| 27 September 2025 6 | Leeds United | 2–2 | Bournemouth | Leeds |
| 15:00 BST | Rodon 37'; Longstaff 54'; Aaronson (yellow card) 70'; Ampadu (yellow card) 90+2' | Report | Jiménez (yellow card) 12'; Semenyo 26'; Kroupi 90+3', (yellow card) 90+3' | Stadium: Elland Road; Attendance: 36,574; Referee: Michael Oliver |

| 3 October 2025 7 | Bournemouth | 3–1 | Fulham | Bournemouth |
| 20:00 BST | Semenyo 78', 90+6'; Kluivert 84' | Report | Sessegnon 70'; Diop (yellow card) 76' | Stadium: Dean Court; Attendance: 11,165; Referee: Simon Hooper |
Note: Fixture was initially scheduled for 4 October, but was moved for live Sky Sports broadcast.

| 18 October 2025 8 | Crystal Palace | 3–3 | Bournemouth | Selhurst |
| 15:00 BST | Pino (yellow card) 62'; Mateta 64', 69', 90+7' (pen.) | Report | Semenyo (yellow card) 2'; Kroupi 7', 38'; Adams (yellow card) 40'; Senesi (yellow card) 51'; Christie 89', (yellow card) 90' | Stadium: Selhurst Park; Attendance: 25,125; Referee: Jarred Gillett |

| 26 October 2025 9 | Bournemouth | 2–0 | Nottingham Forest | Bournemouth |
| 14:00 GMT | Kluivert (yellow card) 18'; Tavernier 25'; Kroupi 40'; Senesi (yellow card) 63'; Brooks (yellow card) 88' | Report | Douglas Luiz (yellow card) 18' | Stadium: Dean Court; Attendance: 11,204; Referee: Sam Barrott |
Note: Fixture was initially scheduled for 25 October, but was moved due to Nottingham Forest's involvement in the UEFA Europa League.

| 2 November 2025 10 | Manchester City | 3–1 | Bournemouth | Manchester |
| 16:30 GMT | Haaland 17', 33'; Donnarumma (yellow card) 26'; Foden (yellow card) 45+2'; O'Reilly 60' | Report | Adams 25'; Truffert (yellow card) 65'; Kluivert (yellow card) 87' | Stadium: Etihad Stadium; Attendance: 52,387; Referee: Anthony Taylor |
Note: Fixture was initially scheduled for 1 November, but was moved for live Sky Sports broadcast.

| 9 November 2025 11 | Aston Villa | 4–0 | Bournemouth | Birmingham |
| 14:00 GMT | Rogers (yellow card) 13'; Kamara (yellow card) 23'; Buendía 28'; Onana 40'; Barkley 77'; Malen 83' | Report | Jiménez (yellow card) 27'; Truffert (yellow card) 38'; Semenyo (penalty missed) 67' | Stadium: Villa Park; Attendance: 40,792; Referee: John Brooks |
Note: Fixture was initially scheduled for 8 November, but was moved due to Aston Villa's involvement in the UEFA Europa League.

| 22 November 2025 12 | Bournemouth | 2–2 | West Ham United | Bournemouth |
| 15:00 GMT | Brooks (yellow card) 34'; Tavernier 69' (pen.); Ünal 81'; Truffert (yellow card) 83'; Senesi (yellow card) 90+6' | Report | Wilson 12', 35'; Todibo (yellow card) 34'; Wan-Bissaka (yellow card) 83' | Stadium: Dean Court; Attendance: 11,216; Referee: Thomas Bramall |

| 29 November 2025 13 | Sunderland | 3–2 | Bournemouth | Sunderland |
| 15:00 GMT | Alderete (yellow card) 21'; Le Fée 30' (pen.); Traoré 46'; Hume (yellow card) 65'; Brobbey 69'; Roefs (yellow card) 90'; Mukiele (yellow card) 90+3'; Mundle (yellow card) 90+8' | Report | Adli 7'; Adams 15'; Scott (yellow card) 25'; Semenyo (yellow card) 86'; Senesi (yellow card) 90+1'; Brooks (yellow card) 90+3'; Cook (red card) 90+6'; Tavernier (yellow card) 90+12' | Stadium: Stadium of Light; Attendance: 46,973; Referee: Tim Robinson |

| 2 December 2025 14 | Bournemouth | 0–1 | Everton | Bournemouth |
| 19:30 GMT | Kluivert (yellow card) 45'; Adams (yellow card) 53'; Ünal (yellow card) 89' | Report | Iroegbunam (yellow card) 22'; Mykolenko (yellow card) 49'; Grealish 78'; Alcaraz (yellow card) 79' | Stadium: Dean Court; Attendance: 11,161; Referee: Michael Salisbury |
Note: Fixture was initially scheduled for 3 December, but was moved for live Sky Sports broadcast.

| 6 December 2025 15 | Bournemouth | 0–0 | Chelsea | Bournemouth |
| 15:00 GMT | | Report | Guiu (yellow card) 85'; Neto (yellow card) 90+1' | Stadium: Dean Court; Attendance: 11,240; Referee: Michael Oliver |

| 15 December 2025 16 | Manchester United | 4–4 | Bournemouth | Trafford |
| 20:00 GMT | Amad 13'; Dalot (yellow card) 43'; Casemiro 45+4', (yellow card) 50'; Fernandes 77'; Cunha 79' | Report | Semenyo 40', (yellow card) 43'; Evanilson 46'; Tavernier 52'; Senesi (yellow card) 76'; Smith (yellow card) 78'; Kroupi 84' | Stadium: Old Trafford; Attendance: 73,951; Referee: Simon Hooper |
Note: Fixture was initially scheduled for 13 December, but was moved for live Sky Sports broadcast.

| 20 December 2025 17 | Bournemouth | 1–1 | Burnley | Bournemouth |
| 15:00 GMT | Semenyo 67'; Brooks (yellow card) 74' | Report | Flemming (yellow card) 38'; Broja 90' | Stadium: Dean Court; Attendance: 10,762; Referee: Chris Kavanagh |

| 27 December 2025 18 | Brentford | 4–1 | Bournemouth | Brentford |
| 15:00 GMT | Schade 7', 51', 90+6'; Petrović 39' (o.g.); Jensen (yellow card) 75'; Kayode (yellow card) 82' | Report | Semenyo 75'; Kluivert (yellow card) 82'; Tavernier (yellow card) 90+1' | Stadium: Gtech Community Stadium; Attendance: 17,152; Referee: Peter Bankes |

| 30 December 2025 19 | Chelsea | 2–2 | Bournemouth | Fulham |
| 19:30 GMT | Caicedo (yellow card) 4'; Palmer 15' (pen.); Fernández 23' | Report | Brooks 6'; Kluivert 27'; Tavernier (yellow card) 84' | Stadium: Stamford Bridge; Attendance: 39,622; Referee: Sam Barrott |
Note: Fixture was originally scheduled for a 19:45 kick-off, but was moved for live Sky Sports broadcast.

| 3 January 2026 20 | Bournemouth | 2–3 | Arsenal | Bournemouth |
| 17:30 GMT | Evanilson 10'; Semenyo (yellow card) 26'; Kroupi 76', (yellow card) 80'; Adli (yellow card) 90+1' | Report | Gabriel 16'; Rice 54', 71'; Zubimendi (yellow card) 70' | Stadium: Dean Court; Attendance: 11,240; Referee: Chris Kavanagh |
Note: Fixture was originally scheduled for a 15:00 kick-off, but was moved for live Sky Sports broadcast.

| 7 January 2026 21 | Bournemouth | 3–2 | Tottenham Hotspur | Bournemouth |
| 19:30 GMT | Evanilson 22'; Kroupi 36'; Semenyo (yellow card) 43', (goal) 90+5'; Cook (yellow card) 51'; Jiménez (yellow card) 77' | Report | Tel 5'; Porro (yellow card) 60'; Kolo Muani (yellow card) 61'; Van de Ven (yellow card) 75'; Palhinha 78' | Stadium: Dean Court; Attendance: 11,212; Referee: Darren England |
Note: Fixture was originally scheduled for a 19:45 kick-off, but was moved for live Sky Sports broadcast.

| 19 January 2026 22 | Brighton & Hove Albion | 1–1 | Bournemouth | Brighton and Hove |
| 20:00 GMT | Welbeck (yellow card) 58'; Van Hecke (yellow card) 77'; Kostoulas 90+1' | Report | Tavernier 32' (pen.); Senesi (yellow card) 60'; Smith (yellow card) 83'; Petrović (yellow card) 85' | Stadium: Falmer Stadium; Attendance: 30,172; Referee: Paul Tierney |
Note: Fixture was initially scheduled for 17 January, but was moved for live Sky Sports broadcast.

| 24 January 2026 23 | Bournemouth | 3–2 | Liverpool | Bournemouth |
| 17:30 GMT | Evanilson 26'; Jiménez 33'; Kroupi (yellow card) 45+3'; Adli 90+5' | Report | Van Dijk 45'; Szoboszlai 80'; Gravenberch (yellow card) 90+3' | Stadium: Dean Court; Attendance: 11,260; Referee: Michael Salisbury |
Note: Fixture was originally scheduled for a 15:00 kick-off, but was moved for live Sky Sports broadcast.

| 31 January 2026 24 | Wolverhampton Wanderers | 0–2 | Bournemouth | Wolverhampton |
| 15:00 GMT | André (yellow card) 45+1'; Mosquera (yellow card) 61'; João Gomes (yellow card) 75' | Report | Kroupi 33'; Jiménez (yellow card) 58'; Adli (yellow card) 60'; Hill (yellow card) 88'; Scott 90+1' | Stadium: Molineux Stadium; Attendance: 30,161; Referee: Michael Oliver |

| 7 February 2026 25 | Bournemouth | 1–1 | Aston Villa | Bournemouth |
| 15:00 GMT | Jiménez (yellow card) 35'; Rayan 55' | Report | Rogers 22'; Buendía (yellow card) 35' | Stadium: Dean Court; Attendance: 11,248; Referee: Anthony Taylor |

| 10 February 2026 26 | Everton | 1–2 | Bournemouth | Liverpool |
| 19:30 GMT | Ndiaye 42' (pen.); Beto (yellow card) 66'; O'Brien (red card) 69' | Report | Rayan (yellow card) 57', (goal) 61'; Adli 64'; Brooks (yellow card) 81'; Jiménez (yellow card) 90+6' | Stadium: Hill Dickinson Stadium; Attendance: 50,196; Referee: Andrew Madley |
Note: Fixture was initially scheduled for 11 February, but was moved for live TNT Sports broadcast.

| 21 February 2026 27 | West Ham United | 0–0 | Bournemouth | Stratford |
| 17:30 GMT | Souček (yellow card) 33' | Report | Senesi (yellow card) 44' | Stadium: London Stadium; Attendance: 62,437; Referee: Sam Barrott |
Note: Fixture was originally scheduled for a 15:00 kick-off, but was moved for live Sky Sports broadcast.

| 28 February 2026 28 | Bournemouth | 1–1 | Sunderland | Bournemouth |
| 12:30 GMT | Adams (yellow card) 58'; Evanilson 63'; Tóth (yellow card) 86'; Christie (yellow card) 90'; Scott (yellow card) 90+5' | Report | Mayenda 18'; Sadiki (yellow card) 33'; Roefs (yellow card) 74' | Stadium: Dean Court; Attendance: 11,240; Referee: Jarred Gillett |
Note: Fixture was originally scheduled for a 15:00 kick-off, but was moved for live TNT Sports broadcast.

| 3 March 2026 29 | Bournemouth | 0–0 | Brentford | Bournemouth |
| 19:30 GMT | Adams (yellow card) 90+4'; Tavernier (yellow card) 90+5' | Report | Jensen (yellow card) 60' | Stadium: Dean Court; Attendance: 11,108; Referee: Craig Pawson |
Note: Fixture was originally scheduled for 4 March, but was moved for live TNT Sports broadcast.

| 14 March 2026 30 | Burnley | 0–0 | Bournemouth | Burnley |
| 15:00 GMT | Mejbri (yellow card) 75' | Report | | Stadium: Turf Moor; Attendance: 20,281; Referee: Peter Bankes |

| 20 March 2026 31 | Bournemouth | 2–2 | Manchester United | Bournemouth |
| 20:00 GMT | Jiménez (yellow card) 59'; Christie 67'; Kroupi 81' (pen.); Smith (yellow card) 90+2' | Report | Casemiro (yellow card) 28'; Fernandes 61' (pen.); Hill 71' (o.g.); Maguire (red card) 78'; Šeško (yellow card) 90+5' | Stadium: Dean Court; Attendance: 11,250; Referee: Stuart Attwell |
Note: Fixture was originally scheduled for 21 March, but was moved for live Sky Sports broadcast.

| 11 April 2026 32 | Arsenal | 1–2 | Bournemouth | Holloway |
| 12:30 BST | Gyökeres 35' (pen.), (yellow card) 80' | Report | Kroupi 17', (yellow card) 79'; Scott 74'; Truffert (yellow card) 77'; Hill (yellow card) 90+6' | Stadium: Emirates Stadium; Attendance: 60,210; Referee: Michael Oliver |
Note: Fixture was originally scheduled for a 15:00 kick-off, but was moved for live TNT Sports broadcast.

| 18 April 2026 33 | Newcastle United | 1–2 | Bournemouth | Newcastle upon Tyne |
| 15:00 BST | Osula 68'; Botman (yellow card) 77'; J. Murphy (yellow card) 80' | Report | Tavernier 32', (yellow card) 55'; Christie (yellow card) 52'; Scott (yellow card) 82'; Truffert 85'; Petrović (yellow card) 90+4' | Stadium: St James' Park; Attendance: 52,109; Referee: Thomas Bramall |

| 22 April 2026 34 | Bournemouth | 2–2 | Leeds United | Bournemouth |
| 20:00 BST | Kroupi (yellow card) 25', (goal) 60'; Jiménez (yellow card) 41'; Rayan 85'; Evanilson (yellow card) 90+5' | Report | Hill 68' (o.g.); Longstaff 90+7' | Stadium: Dean Court; Attendance: 11,226; Referee: Michael Salisbury |
Note: Fixture was initially scheduled for 25 April, but was moved due to Leeds United's involvement in the FA Cup semi-finals. The game was also selected for live Sky Sports broadcast.

| 3 May 2026 35 | Bournemouth | 3–0 | Crystal Palace | Bournemouth |
| 14:00 BST | Lerma 10' (o.g.); Kroupi 32' (pen.); Rayan 77' | Report | Canvot (yellow card) 6'; Lacroix (yellow card) 38' | Stadium: Dean Court; Attendance: 11,122; Referee: Robert Jones |
Note: Fixture was initially scheduled for 2 May, but was moved due to Crystal Palace's involvement in the UEFA Conference League. The game was also selected for live Sky Sports broadcast.

| 9 May 2026 36 | Fulham | 0–1 | Bournemouth | Fulham |
| 15:00 BST | Andersen (red card) 45+7'; Muniz (yellow card) 50'; Lukić (yellow card) 59'; Robinson (yellow card) 77'; King (yellow card) 82' | Report | Christie (red card) 41'; Rayan 53'; Scott (yellow card) 65'; Tavernier (yellow card) 90+5' | Stadium: Craven Cottage; Attendance: 27,626; Referee: Andrew Madley |

| 19 May 2026 37 | Bournemouth | 1–1 | Manchester City | Bournemouth |
| 19:30 BST | Adams (yellow card) 37'; Kroupi 39'; Hill (yellow card) 59'; Kluivert (yellow card) 90+3'; Truffert (yellow card) 90+6' | Report | Rodri (yellow card) 90+3'; Haaland 90+5' | Stadium: Dean Court; Attendance: 11,218; Referee: Anthony Taylor |
Note: Fixture was initially scheduled for 17 April, but was moved due to Manchester City's involvement in the FA Cup final.

| 24 May 2026 38 | Nottingham Forest | 1–1 | Bournemouth | West Bridgford |
| 16:00 BST | Gibbs-White 34'; Awoniyi (yellow card) 66' | Report | Hill (yellow card) 33'; Tavernier 54' | Stadium: City Ground; Attendance: 30,741; Referee: Craig Pawson |

=== FA Cup ===
As a Premier League club, Bournemouth entered the FA Cup in the third round, and were drawn away to fellow Premier League side Newcastle United, who eliminated Bournemouth from the competition after winning on penalties.

Win Draw Loss Fixtures

| 10 January 2026 Third round | Newcastle United | 3–3 (a.e.t.) (7–6 p) | Bournemouth | Newcastle upon Tyne |
| 15:00 GMT | Barnes 50', 118'; Bruno Guimarães (yellow card) 90+3'; Gordon 90+5' (pen.) | Report | Scott 62', (yellow card) 81'; Brooks 68'; Soler (yellow card) 76'; Tavernier (yellow card) 86', (goal) 120+2'; Petrović (yellow card) 90+3'; Cook (yellow card) 95' | Stadium: St James' Park; Attendance: 51,563; Referee: Thomas Bramall |
| | Penalties |
| | Gordon (penalty scored); Woltemade (penalty missed); Bruno Guimarães (penalty missed); Tonali (penalty scored); Joelinton (penalty scored); Hall (penalty scored); Miley (penalty scored); Barnes (penalty scored); Thiaw (penalty scored) | | (penalty scored) Tavernier; (penalty missed) Evanilson; (penalty scored) Cook; (penalty missed) Jiménez; (penalty scored) Senesi; (penalty scored) Hill; (penalty scored) Truffert; (penalty scored) Smith; (penalty missed) Diakité |

=== EFL Cup ===
As a Premier League club not competing in any European competitions, Bournemouth entered the EFL Cup in the second round, and were drawn at home to fellow Premier League side Brentford, where they were eliminated from the competition after defeat.

Win Draw Loss Fixtures

| 26 August 2025 Second round | Bournemouth | 0–2 | Brentford | Bournemouth |
| 19:45 BST | Adli (yellow card) 51'; Araujo (yellow card) 70' (yellow-red card) 90+1' | Report | Carvalho 34', (yellow card) 70'; Thiago 65', (yellow card) 80'; Kayode (yellow card) 87' | Stadium: Dean Court; Attendance: 10,499; Referee: Michael Salisbury |

== Statistics ==
=== Appearances and goals ===
Players with no appearances are not included on the list
Italics indicate a loaned in player

| No. | Pos | Nat | Player | Total | | Premier League | | FA Cup | | EFL Cup | |
| No. | Pos | Nat | Player | Apps | Goals | Apps | Goals | Apps | Goals | Apps | Goals |
|---|---|---|---|---|---|---|---|---|---|---|---|
| 1 | GK | (Serbia) SRB | Đorđe Petrović | 40 | 0 | 38 | 0 | 1 | 0 | 1 | 0 |
| 3 | DF | (France) FRA | Adrien Truffert | 39 | 1 | 38 | 1 | 0+1 | 0 | 0 | 0 |
| 4 | MF | (England) ENG | Lewis Cook | 19 | 0 | 8+10 | 0 | 1 | 0 | 0 | 0 |
| 5 | DF | (Argentina) ARG | Marcos Senesi | 39 | 0 | 37 | 0 | 0+1 | 0 | 0+1 | 0 |
| 6 | DF | (Argentina) ARG | Julio Soler | 5 | 0 | 0+3 | 0 | 1 | 0 | 1 | 0 |
| 7 | MF | (Wales) WAL | David Brooks | 33 | 2 | 13+18 | 1 | 1 | 1 | 0+1 | 0 |
| 8 | MF | (England) ENG | Alex Scott | 39 | 4 | 34+3 | 3 | 1 | 1 | 1 | 0 |
| 9 | FW | (Brazil) BRA | Evanilson | 38 | 6 | 32+4 | 6 | 0+1 | 0 | 0+1 | 0 |
| 10 | MF | (Scotland) SCO | Ryan Christie | 27 | 2 | 9+17 | 2 | 0 | 0 | 1 | 0 |
| 11 | FW | (Scotland) SCO | Ben Gannon-Doak | 9 | 0 | 0+8 | 0 | 0 | 0 | 1 | 0 |
| 12 | MF | (United States) USA | Tyler Adams | 26 | 2 | 21+4 | 2 | 0 | 0 | 0+1 | 0 |
| 15 | DF | (England) ENG | Adam Smith | 23 | 0 | 14+8 | 0 | 1 | 0 | 0 | 0 |
| 16 | MF | (England) ENG | Marcus Tavernier | 35 | 8 | 31+3 | 7 | 0+1 | 1 | 0 | 0 |
| 18 | DF | (France) FRA | Bafodé Diakité | 20 | 0 | 15+3 | 0 | 1 | 0 | 1 | 0 |
| 19 | FW | (Netherlands) NED | Justin Kluivert | 21 | 2 | 10+10 | 2 | 0 | 0 | 1 | 0 |
| 20 | DF | (Spain) ESP | Álex Jiménez | 32 | 1 | 26+5 | 1 | 0+1 | 0 | 0 | 0 |
| 21 | MF | (Morocco) MAR | Amine Adli | 33 | 3 | 10+21 | 3 | 1 | 0 | 1 | 0 |
| 22 | FW | (France) FRA | Eli Junior Kroupi | 35 | 13 | 21+12 | 13 | 1 | 0 | 1 | 0 |
| 23 | DF | (England) ENG | James Hill | 31 | 0 | 22+7 | 0 | 1 | 0 | 1 | 0 |
| 26 | FW | (Turkey) TUR | Enes Ünal | 23 | 1 | 0+22 | 1 | 1 | 0 | 0 | 0 |
| 27 | MF | (Hungary) HUN | Alex Tóth | 9 | 0 | 2+7 | 0 | 0 | 0 | 0 | 0 |
| 37 | FW | (Brazil) BRA | Rayan | 15 | 5 | 13+2 | 5 | 0 | 0 | 0 | 0 |
| 44 | DF | (Serbia) SRB | Veljko Milosavljević | 7 | 0 | 4+3 | 0 | 0 | 0 | 0 | 0 |
| 50 | FW | (England) ENG | Remy Rees-Dottin | 1 | 0 | 0 | 0 | 0+1 | 0 | 0 | 0 |
Players who featured but departed the club on loan during the season:
| 2 | DF | (Mexico) MEX | Julián Araujo | 1 | 0 | 0 | 0 | 0 | 0 | 1 | 0 |
| 25 | MF | (Ivory Coast) CIV | Hamed Traorè | 1 | 0 | 0+1 | 0 | 0 | 0 | 0 | 0 |
| 47 | MF | (England) ENG | Ben Winterburn | 1 | 0 | 0+1 | 0 | 0 | 0 | 0 | 0 |
Players who featured but departed the club permanently during the season:
| 24 | FW | (Ghana) GHA | Antoine Semenyo | 21 | 10 | 20 | 10 | 0 | 0 | 0+1 | 0 |
