= Veljko Milosavljević =

Serbian footballer (born 2007)

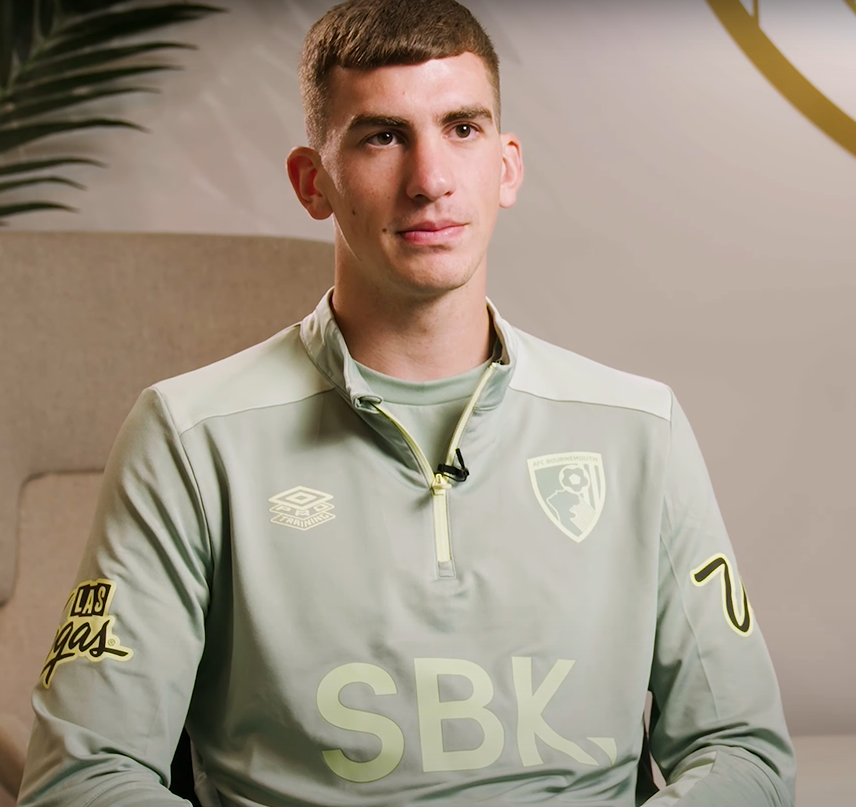
- Milosavljević with Bournemouth in 2025

Personal information
- Date of birth: 28 June 2007 (age 19)
- Place of birth: Požarevac, Serbia
- Height: 1.92 m (6 ft 4 in)
- Position: Centre-back

Team information
- Current team: Bournemouth
- Number: 44

Senior career*
Years	Team	Apps	(Gls)
2023–2025	Red Star Belgrade	17	(0)
2024	→ Grafičar Beograd (dual)	9	(0)
2025–	Bournemouth	7	(0)

International career^{‡}
2021–2022	Serbia U16	8	(0)
2022–2024	Serbia U17	18	(1)
2024–	Serbia U19	11	(2)
2025–	Serbia U21	3	(0)
2025–	Serbia	2	(0)
Medal record
Men's football
Representing Serbia
UEFA European Under-17 Championship
Bronze medal – third place	2024 Cyprus
- * Club domestic league appearances and goals as of 20 January 2026 ‡ National team caps and goals as of 14 October 2025

Veljko Milosavljević (Serbian Cyrillic: Вељко Милосављевић; born 28 June 2007) is a Serbian professional footballer who plays as a centre-back for Premier League club Bournemouth and the Serbia national team.

== Club career ==
Milosavljević completed the entire Red Star Belgrade youth school. He is the third youngest debutant in the history of the club, which speaks volumes about the potential that the tall stopper possesses. Due to his great technical characteristics, Milosavljević often performed in the position of defensive midfielder in younger selections.

During the 2023–24 Serbian SuperLiga season, Milosavljević played for the youth team of Red Star and appeared in the Serbian Cup matches for the first team against OFK Vršac and Trayal. In August 2024, he was sent on dual registration to fellow Belgrade club Grafičar.

On 1 September 2025, Milosavljević joined Premier League club AFC Bournemouth on a long-term contract in a deal worth £13,000,000. On 15 September, he made his league debut in a 2–1 victory against Brighton & Hove Albion.

== International career ==
On 11 October 2025, Milosavljević debuted for Serbian senior team in a 2026 FIFA World Cup qualification against Albania, which ended in a 0–1 home loss for the Serbs.

== Career statistics ==
As of 20 January 2026

Appearances and goals by club, season and competition
Club	Season	League			National cup (Note: Includes Serbian Cup)		League cup		Europe		Total	
Club	Season	Division	Apps	Goals	Apps	Goals	Apps	Goals	Apps	Goals	Apps	Goals
Red Star Belgrade	2023–24	Serbian SuperLiga	0	0	2	0	—		0	0	2	0
Red Star Belgrade	2024–25	Serbian SuperLiga	14	0	3	0	—		0	0	17	0
Red Star Belgrade	2025–26	Serbian SuperLiga	3	0	0	0	—		5 (Note: Appearances in UEFA Champions League)	0	8	0
Red Star Belgrade	Total		17	0	5	0	—		5	0	27	0
Grafičar Beograd (loan)	2024–25	Serbian First League	9	0	0	0	—		—		9	0
Bournemouth	2025–26	Premier League	7	0	0	0	—		—		7	0
Bournemouth	2026–27	Premier League	0	0	0	0	0	0	0	0	0	0
Bournemouth	Total		7	0	0	0	0	0	0	0	7	0
Career total			33	0	5	0	0	0	5	0	43	0

=== International ===
As of match played 14 October 2025

Appearances and goals by national team and year
National team	Year	Apps	Goals
Serbia	2025	2	0
Total		2	0

== Honours ==
Red Star Belgrade

- Serbian SuperLiga: 2024–25
- Serbian Cup: 2024–25
