= Tyler Adams =

American soccer player (born 1999)

- Adams with the United States in 2026

Personal information
- Full name: Tyler Shaan Adams
- Date of birth: February 14, 1999 (age 27)
- Place of birth: Wappingers Falls, New York, U.S.
- Height: 5 ft 9 in (1.75 m)
- Position: Defensive midfielder

Team information
- Current team: Bournemouth
- Number: 12

Youth career
- 2012–2015: New York Red Bulls

Senior career*
Years	Team	Apps	(Gls)
2015–2016	New York Red Bulls II	31	(0)
2016–2019	New York Red Bulls	59	(2)
2019–2022	RB Leipzig	75	(1)
2022–2023	Leeds United	24	(0)
2023–	Bournemouth	66	(2)

International career^{‡}
2014–2015	United States U17	23	(0)
2016–2017	United States U20	12	(1)
2017–	United States	64	(2)
Medal record
Men's soccer
Representing United States
CONCACAF Gold Cup
Runner-up	2025 Canada–United States
CONCACAF Nations League
Winner	2021 United States
Winner	2024 United States
CONCACAF Under-20 Championship
Winner	2017 Costa Rica
- * Club domestic league appearances and goals as of November 8, 2026 ‡ National team caps and goals as of November 17, 2026

Tyler Shaan Adams (born February 14, 1999) is an American professional soccer player who plays for Premier League club Bournemouth and captains the United States national team. Primarily a midfielder, he is capable of playing as a full-back on either side of the defense or midfield.

A homegrown player of the New York Red Bulls academy, Adams turned professional with the New York Red Bulls II as a sixteen-year-old before joining the New York Red Bulls first team a season later. Adams joined fellow Red Bull side RB Leipzig in January 2019 and played four seasons with the club, winning the 2021–22 DFB-Pokal. He joined Leeds United in July 2022, but following relegation he signed for Bournemouth in August 2023 for five years. In November 2025, Adams became the first American to win both the BBC Goal of the Month and Premier League Goal of the Month award.

Adams represented the United States at multiple youth levels before making his senior team debut in 2017. He captained the U.S. at the 2022 FIFA World Cup and won the U.S. Soccer Player of the Year award in 2022.

== Early life ==
Adams was born in Dutchess County, New York to Melissa Russo. Tyler credits much of the success in his life to his mother's unwavering devotion to him. Examples of this include Melissa driving the over 150 mile round trip to the Red Bulls facility before Tyler was old enough to make the journey himself. Melissa raised Tyler for most of his early years on her own. Eventually Melissa married Daryl Sullivan and his three sons became an essential part of Tyler's life. He is of African American descent through his father. His stepfather, Daryl Sullivan, coached soccer at the high school level and at Marist College. Adams graduated from Roy C. Ketcham High School in Wappingers Falls, New York.

== Club career ==
=== Youth ===
Adams joined the Red Bulls Academy in 2012 and played with the under-13, under-14, and under-16 sides before turning professional.

=== New York Red Bulls II ===
==== 2015: Debut season ====
On March 19, 2015, Adams was signed to New York Red Bulls II, the club's senior reserve team playing in the United Soccer League. Adams made his debut for the team on April 4, 2015, in a 4–1 victory over Toronto FC II, the first victory in club history.

==== 2016: USL Cup win ====
After appearing regularly for NYRB II during the 2016 season, Adams helped the club to a 5–1 victory over Swope Park Rangers in the 2016 USL Cup Final.

=== New York Red Bulls ===
On July 23, 2015, Adams made his debut with the New York Red Bulls first team featuring in a friendly match against Premier League champions Chelsea. He scored the second goal of the match, slotting a header past Asmir Begović in the 69th minute as the Red Bulls went on to win 4–2.

Adams signed his first senior team contract on November 3, 2015, and joined the first team in preseason training camp in 2016. Adams made his first MLS bench appearance as an unused substitute on April 1, 2016, during a 1–0 loss to the New England Revolution and on April 13 made his MLS debut, starting against the San Jose Earthquakes before returning to Red Bulls II on loan for the remainder of the season and year.

Adams emerged as a regular starter for the Red Bulls senior team in the 2017 season. On August 15, 2017, Adams helped New York to a 3–2 come from behind victory over FC Cincinnati, assisting on Bradley Wright-Phillips's 77th-minute equalizer. With the win New York reached their first Open Cup final since 2003. Adams scored his first two MLS goals in a 3–3 draw with D.C. United on September 27, 2017.

On March 13, 2018, Adams opened the scoring for New York in a 3–1 victory over Club Tijuana, helping the club advance to the semifinals of the CONCACAF Champions League for the first time.

=== RB Leipzig ===
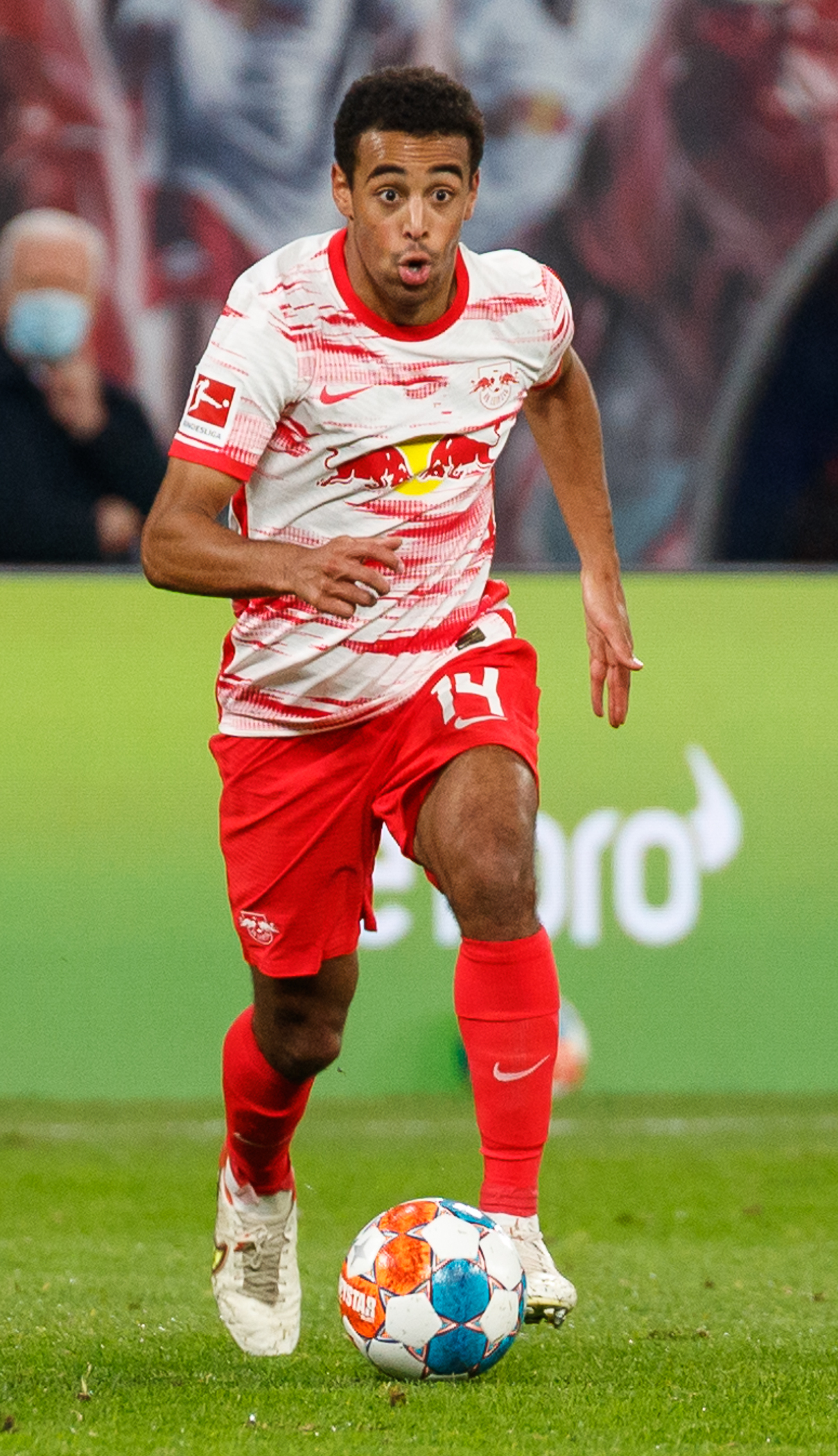
Adams playing for RB Leipzig in 2021

==== 2018–19: Debut season ====
Adams joined RB Leipzig in January 2019, reuniting him with former coach Jesse Marsch. He made his first league start on January 27 in a 4–0 victory against Fortuna Düsseldorf. On February 16, Adams recorded his first Bundesliga assist in a 3–1 victory over Stuttgart. He missed the entirety of April games due to an abductor injury, and until then Leipzig had not lost a single game with him on the field. On May 16, Adams returned to the team, and eleven days later started the DFB-Pokal final against Bayern Munich, which Leipzig lost 0–3.

==== 2019–20: Champions League semi-finals ====
A groin injury kept Adams sidelined for the summer of 2019 and the first half of the 2019–20 Bundesliga season. He returned for the last game before winter break, playing 86 minutes in a 3–1 victory over FC Augsburg. On March 10, Adams made his UEFA Champions League debut in the second leg game against Tottenham Hotspur, when he entered in the 56th minute as a substitute for Nordi Mukiele who sustained a head injury. Adams missed the first leg due to a minor calf injury. The game finished 3–0 (4–0 on aggregate) with Leipzig victorious and advancing to the next round.

On August 13, 2020, Adams scored the winning goal for Leipzig in a 2–1 win over Atlético Madrid, helping the club advance to the semifinals of the UEFA Champions League for the first time.

=== Leeds United ===
Adams joined Leeds United on a five-year contract for a reported £20 million transfer fee on July 6, 2022. He made his league debut for Leeds on August 6 as part of the starting line-up in their season opener, a 2–1 home win over Wolverhampton Wanderers. After playing for several months in the center of midfield, Adams damaged his hamstring in a training session prior to Leeds’ March 18 win over Wolves and had surgery on his hamstring later that month. He did not play for the club or internationally for the remainder of the season.

Following Leeds' relegation, it was reported that Adams was set to move to Chelsea after they met his £20 million release clause. However, the deal collapsed and Chelsea subsequently signed Moises Caicedo. Then-Chelsea manager (and later Adams' manager with the US National Team) Mauricio Pochettino later confirmed that Adams' injury and failed medical prompted the club to pull out.

=== Bournemouth ===
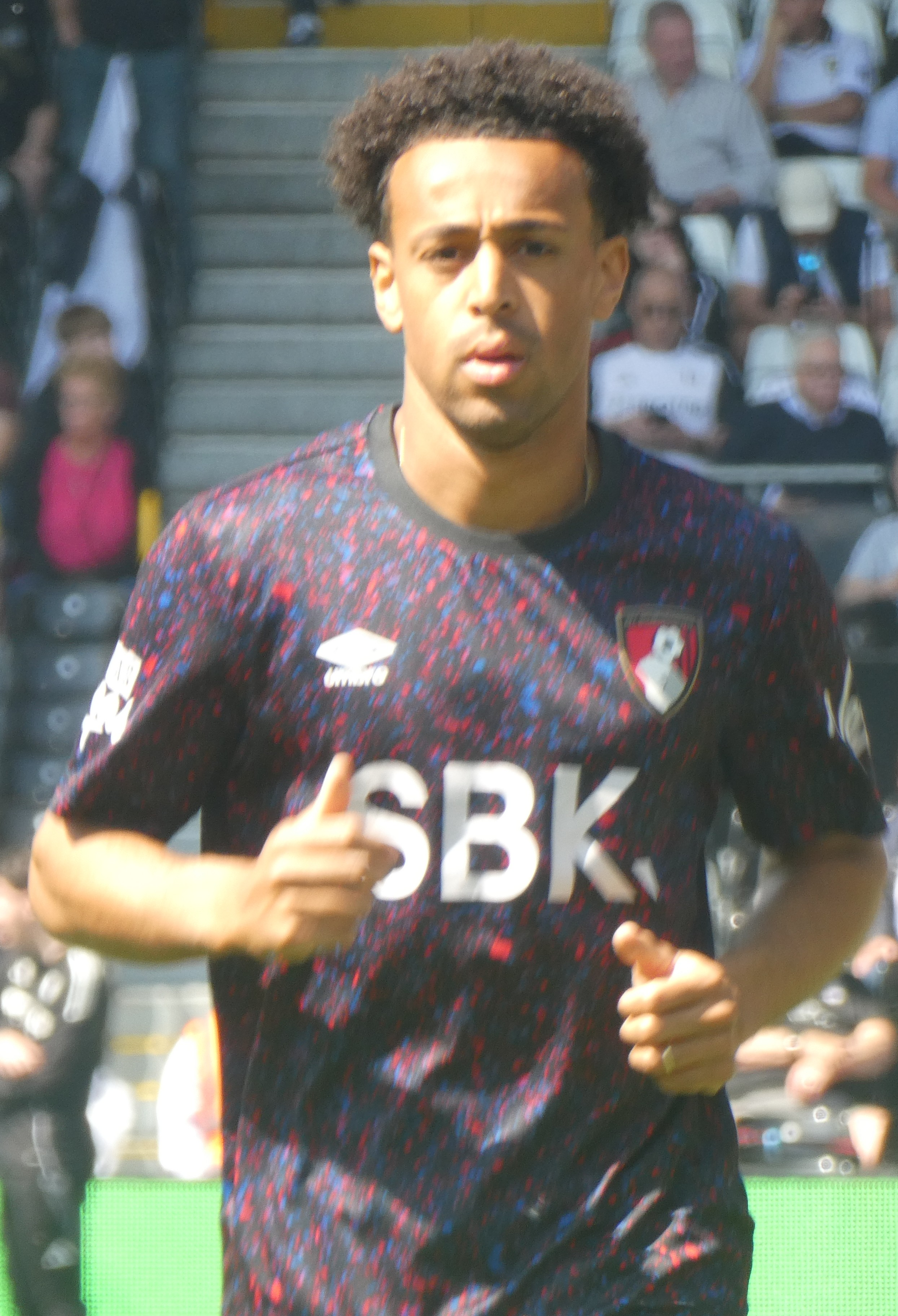
Adams with Bournemouth in 2026

On August 20, 2023, Adams signed for Premier League club Bournemouth on a five-year deal. Adams was named Bournemouth's Player of the Month for February 2025. On November 2, 2025, Adams scored his first goal for the club in a 3–1 defeat to Manchester City at Etihad Stadium.

Adams won the Premier League's November 2025 Goal of the Month award for his long-range strike from inside the centre circle in a 3–2 away loss at Sunderland on November 29, becoming the first American player to win the award. However, he suffered a torn medial collateral ligament (MCL) on December 15, 2025, early in Bournemouth's 4–4 league tie at Old Trafford which manager Andoni Iraola assessed as keeping the midfielder out of the team for "around two or three months." Adams returned to the starting lineup in February 2026 and helped lead Bournemouth to a 6th-place finish in the Premier League, and their first ever European qualification.

== International career ==
=== 2015–2017: Youth level ===
Adams has represented the United States at the under-15, under-17, and under-20 levels. He appeared in all of his team's matches at the 2015 CONCACAF Under-17 Championships in Honduras, helping the United States qualify for the 2015 FIFA Under-17 World Cup. In May 2017 Adams played every match for the United States at the 2017 FIFA Under-20 World Cup in South Korea, which proved to be a breakout tournament for him at the same time that he cemented himself as a starter for the New York Red Bulls.

=== 2017–2019: Senior debut and injury ===
On November 14, 2017, Adams earned his first cap for the senior national team, playing the full 90 minutes in a 1–1 draw with Portugal. On September 11, 2018, he scored a goal against Mexico in a friendly at Nissan Stadium in Nashville, Tennessee.

In June 2019, Adams was named to the squad for the 2019 CONCACAF Gold Cup but was forced to withdraw due to an injury.

=== 2022: First FIFA World Cup ===
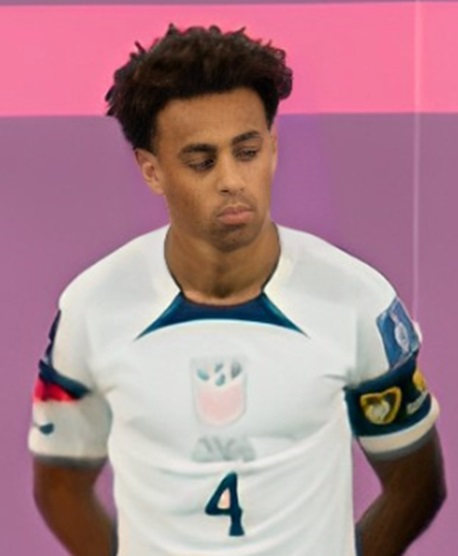
Adams with the United States at the 2022 FIFA World Cup

In November 2022, Adams was named captain of the United States squad for the 2022 FIFA World Cup. This made him the youngest captain at the competition and the youngest American captain since 1950. On January 13, 2023, it was announced he had been voted the 2022 U.S. Soccer Male Player of the Year after Adams led the Americans to the knockout stages of the World Cup.

=== 2026: Second FIFA World Cup ===
Adams with the United States at the 2026 FIFA World Cup

On May 26, 2026, Adams was selected in the 26-man squad for the 2026 FIFA World Cup.

== Personal life ==
Adams also owns a local club “Hudson Valley Hammers” in the USL2. In January 2025, Adams joined the ownership group of USL League One expansion club Westchester SC, near his hometown.

Adams is married to Melissa Schmidt. They have two sons.

== Career statistics ==
=== Club ===
As of match played November 8, 2026

Appearances and goals by club, season and competition
Club	Season	League			National cup (Note: Includes U.S. Open Cup, DFB-Pokal and FA Cup)		League cup (Note: Includes USL Cup playoffs, MLS Cup playoffs and EFL Cup)		Continental		Total	
Club	Season	Division	Apps	Goals	Apps	Goals	Apps	Goals	Apps	Goals	Apps	Goals
New York Red Bulls II	2015	USL	11	0	1	0	—		—		12	0
New York Red Bulls II	2016	USL	22	0	—		4	0	—		26	0
New York Red Bulls II	Total		33	0	1	0	4	0	—		38	0
New York Red Bulls	2016	MLS	1	0	0	0	—		3 (Note: Appearances in CONCACAF Champions League)	0	4	0
New York Red Bulls	2017	MLS	27	2	5	0	3	0	—		35	2
New York Red Bulls	2018	MLS	31	0	1	0	4	0	6	1	42	1
New York Red Bulls	Total		59	2	6	0	7	0	9	1	81	3
RB Leipzig	2018–19	Bundesliga	10	0	2	0	—		—		12	0
RB Leipzig	2019–20	Bundesliga	14	0	0	0	—		3 (Note: Appearances in UEFA Champions League)	1	17	1
RB Leipzig	2020–21	Bundesliga	27	1	4	0	—		6	0	37	1
RB Leipzig	2021–22	Bundesliga	24	0	4	0	—		9 (Note: Five appearances in UEFA Champions League, four appearances in UEFA Europa League)	0	37	0
RB Leipzig	Total		75	1	10	0	—		18	1	103	2
Leeds United	2022–23	Premier League	24	0	2	0	0	0	—		26	0
Bournemouth	2023–24	Premier League	3	0	0	0	1	0	—		4	0
Bournemouth	2024–25	Premier League	28	0	4	0	0	0	—		32	0
Bournemouth	2025–26	Premier League	25	2	0	0	1	0	—		26	2
Bournemouth	2026–27	Premier League	10	0	0	0	1	0	4 (Note: Appearances in UEFA Europa League)	1	15	1
Bournemouth	Total		66	2	4	0	3	0	4	1	77	3
Career total			257	5	23	0	14	0	31	3	325	8

=== International ===
As of match played November 17, 2026

Appearances and goals by national team and year
National team	Year	Apps	Goals
United States	2017	1	0
United States	2018	8	1
United States	2019	1	0
United States	2020	2	0
United States	2021	10	0
United States	2022	14	0
United States	2023	0	0
United States	2024	6	1
United States	2025	10	0
United States	2026	12	0
Total		64	2

Scores and results list the United States' goal tally first, score column indicates score after each Adams goal.

List of international goals scored by Tyler Adams
No.	Date	Venue	Opponent	Score	Result	Competition
1	September 11, 2018	Nissan Stadium, Nashville, United States	Mexico	1–0	1–0	Friendly
2	March 24, 2024	AT&T Stadium, Arlington, United States	Mexico	1–0	2–0	2024 CONCACAF Nations League final

== Honors ==
New York Red Bulls II

- USL Cup: 2016

New York Red Bulls

- Supporters' Shield: 2018

RB Leipzig

- DFB-Pokal: 2021–22

United States U20

- CONCACAF U-20 Championship: 2017

United States

- CONCACAF Nations League: 2019–20, 2023–24

Individual

- MLS All-Star: 2018
- U.S. Soccer Player of the Year: 2022
- CONCACAF Nations League Finals Best XI: 2024, 2025
- IFFHS Men's CONCACAF Team of the Year: 2022, 2025
- Premier League Goal of the Month: November 2025
- BBC Goal of the Month: November 2025
