= David Brooks (footballer) =

Wales international footballer (born 1997)

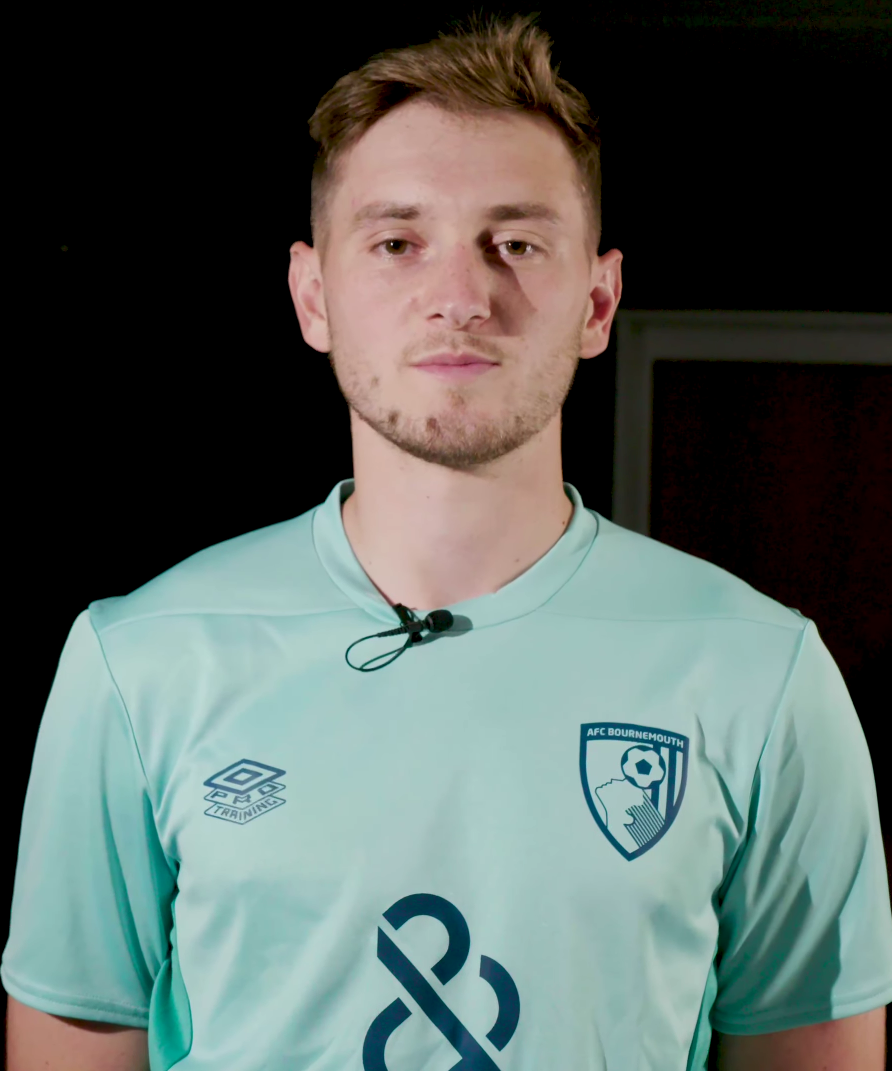
- Brooks with AFC Bournemouth in 2024

Personal information
- Full name: David Robert Brooks
- Date of birth: 8 July 1997 (age 29)
- Place of birth: Warrington, England
- Height: 5 ft 8 in (1.73 m)
- Positions: Winger; attacking midfielder

Team information
- Current team: Bournemouth
- Number: 7

Youth career
- 2004–2014: Manchester City
- 2014–2015: Sheffield United

Senior career*
Years	Team	Apps	(Gls)
2015–2018	Sheffield United	30	(3)
2015	→ FC Halifax Town (loan)	5	(1)
2018–	Bournemouth	162	(18)
2024	→ Southampton (loan)	17	(2)

International career^{‡}
2017	England U20	5	(2)
2017–2018	Wales U21	3	(1)
2017–	Wales	48	(9)
- * Club domestic league appearances and goals as of 06:37, 20 November 2026 (UTC) ‡ National team caps and goals as of 22:14, 17 November 2026 (UTC)

David Robert Brooks (born 8 July 1997) is a professional footballer who plays as a right winger or attacking midfielder for Premier League club Bournemouth and the Wales national team.

== Club career ==
=== Early career ===
Brooks was born in Warrington, Cheshire. He was associated with the Manchester City academy from the age of seven, before he switched to the Sheffield United academy in 2014 and signed professional forms with the club in March 2015. He joined National League side Halifax Town on a one-month loan on 29 August 2015. Brooks had his loan extended into a second month and scored one goal, against Aldershot Town, in his five appearances.

=== Sheffield United ===
He made his first-team debut for the Blades on 30 August 2016, coming on as a 63rd-minute substitute for Matt Done in a 0–0 draw with Leicester City U23 in an EFL Trophy group stage match at Bramall Lane. He made his first start for the club in the next fixture in the competition, a 2–1 home defeat by Walsall on 4 October, following which manager Chris Wilder said that "I think it's difficult for a young player to impress when the players around him aren't performing".

Brooks scored his first senior goal on 27 October 2017, scoring only six minutes after coming on as a substitute against Leeds United to seal the Blades' 2–1 victory in a Yorkshire derby.

In October 2017, he signed a new long-term contract, committing his future to Bramall Lane until the summer of 2021.

=== Bournemouth ===
==== 2018–19 season ====
In July 2018, Brooks joined Bournemouth of the Premier League for a fee of £11.5 million. In doing so, he signed a four-year contract with the club and was assigned the number 20 jersey. Brooks made his Premier League debut in the first game of the 2018–19 season, starting in a 2–0 home win against Cardiff City. He scored his first goal for the club, and his first goal in the Premier League, in a 2–1 home win against Crystal Palace.

Following on from his goal against Palace on 1 October, Brooks scored in Premier League victories over Watford; a 4–0 away win and Fulham; a 3–0 away win, over the rest of the month. This impressive run of form saw him receive the club's Player of the Month award for October.

The run of good form continued for Brooks, scoring the first brace of his career in a 2–0 home win against Brighton & Hove Albion in the Premier League, on 22 December. Manager Eddie Howe commented after the game that he was "pleasantly surprised" by the start Brooks had made to his Bournemouth career, commending his attitude and tactical understanding of Bournemouth's style of play. His performances in December led to his second Player of the Month award, being named the club's Player of the Month for December. Brooks scored the second goal in his club's comprehensive 4–0 home victory over Chelsea, on 30 January, putting in an impressive showing against one of the league's traditional top-six teams.

In March 2019, he signed a new long-term contract with the club, with Howe commenting that: "This contract means he can concentrate on developing his game with us, and it's been an excellent start to David's Bournemouth career."

After scoring again in the Cherries' 5–0 away win over Brighton on 13 April, Brooks finished his maiden top-flight season with Bournemouth with seven goals across 33 total appearances. Due to his performances for the club throughout the 2018–19 season, he was nominated, for the PFA Young Player of the Year award, alongside names such as Manchester City duo Raheem Sterling and Bernardo Silva, and Manchester United's Marcus Rashford.

==== 2019–20 season ====
In a pre-season friendly against Brentford, Brooks suffered an ankle injury which was reportedly set to leave him sidelined until mid-October. In December 2019, following a prolonged period on the sidelines, he underwent a second ankle operation, with the view of being sidelined until mid-March. Commenting on the injury, Brooks said in February that "[I] didn't know it was going to be six months and I don't think the physios would have thought that either".

On 11 March, he returned to training with the rest of the squad after nearly eight months out through injury. Having returned from injury, Brooks scored his first goal of the season, in a 2–1 loss to Man City, on 15 July. He finished the 2019–20 season with nine league appearances and one goal as the Cherries were relegated to the Championship after a five-year stay in the Premier League.

==== 2020–21 season ====
After relegation from the Premier League, Brooks returned to the Cherries side as a sub in their 3–2 opening day win against Blackburn Rovers. Brooks scored his first goals of the season, a brace, in a 1–3 away win at Birmingham City. In November, Brooks was named Championship Player of the Month after scoring two goals and adding three assists in three matches.

==== 2021–22 season ====
On 14 August, Brooks received the first red card of his senior career (after a double-yellow); in a 2–1 away win against Nottingham Forest in the Championship. He also scored the opener in the game.

==== Southampton (loan) ====
On 30 January 2024, Brooks joined Southampton on loan for the remainder of the 2023–24 season. He made his first appearance for the club on 3 February 2024 in a 2–0 victory away to Rotherham United, replacing Ryan Fraser in the 74th minute. On 16 February 2024, Brooks scored his first goal for the club in a 2–0 victory at West Bromwich Albion.

== International career ==
Brooks was eligible to play for his birth country, England and Wales – the latter through his mother, who hails from Llangollen.

On 15 May 2017, he was called up to the Wales U20 squad for the 2017 Toulon Tournament. He later withdrew from the Wales setup, instead being called up to the England U20 squad for the same tournament. England won the tournament and Brooks was given the Best Player award, having scored in the Final.

On 25 August 2017, he was then called up to the Wales U21 squad for the European Championship qualifiers against Switzerland and Portugal. Brooks made his debut for the side on 1 September 2017, in a 3–0 victory over Switzerland, scoring the second goal of the match.

On 28 September 2017, he was called up to the Wales senior squad, for two World Cup qualifiers against Georgia and Ireland. Brooks made his senior debut for Wales, on 10 November 2017, coming on as a substitute in a 2–0 defeat against France.

He scored his first goal for Wales; in a 2–1 away defeat to Croatia after coming on as a substitute.

Brooks was selected in May 2021 by Wales' caretaker manager Rob Page to represent the nation at the delayed UEFA Euro 2020 tournament.

== Personal life ==
On 13 October 2021, Brooks was confirmed to have been diagnosed with Stage 2 Hodgkin lymphoma. Brooks had withdrawn from the Wales squad the week before due to illness. After being sent for a medical examination by the Wales medical staff, the diagnosis was made. After an initial positive prognosis, he was to undergo treatment from the following week.

On 3 May 2022, he announced on his social media that he had been given the all clear and was now cancer free. He played his next league match on 18 March 2023.

== Career statistics ==
=== Club ===
As of match played 5 November 2026

Appearances and goals by club, season and competition
Club	Season	League			FA Cup		EFL Cup		Europe		Other		Total	
Club	Season	Division	Apps	Goals	Apps	Goals	Apps	Goals	Apps	Goals	Apps	Goals	Apps	Goals
Sheffield United	2015–16	League One	0	0	0	0	0	0	—		0	0	0	0
Sheffield United	2016–17	League One	0	0	1	0	0	0	—		3 (Note: Appearances in EFL Trophy)	0	4	0
Sheffield United	2017–18	Championship	30	3	1	0	2	0	—		—		33	3
Sheffield United	Total		30	3	2	0	2	0	—		3	0	37	3
FC Halifax Town (loan)	2015–16	National League	5	1	—		—		—		—		5	1
Bournemouth	2018–19	Premier League	30	7	1	0	2	0	—		—		33	7
Bournemouth	2019–20	Premier League	9	1	0	0	0	0	—		—		9	1
Bournemouth	2020–21	Championship	32	5	3	1	2	0	—		2 (Note: Appearances in Championship play-offs)	0	39	6
Bournemouth	2021–22	Championship	7	1	0	0	2	2	—		—		9	3
Bournemouth	2022–23	Premier League	6	0	0	0	0	0	—		—		6	0
Bournemouth	2023–24	Premier League	13	1	2	1	3	1	—		—		18	3
Bournemouth	2024–25	Premier League	29	2	4	0	0	0	—		—		33	2
Bournemouth	2025–26	Premier League	31	1	1	1	1	0	—		—		33	2
Bournemouth	2026–27	Premier League	5	0	0	0	2	0	2 (Note: Appearances in UEFA Europa League)	0	—		9	0
Bournemouth	Total		162	18	11	3	12	3	2	0	2	0	189	24
Southampton (loan)	2023–24	Championship	17	2	—		—		—		3	0	20	2
Career total			214	24	13	3	14	3	2	0	8	0	251	30

=== International ===
As of match played 17 November 2026

Appearances and goals by national team and year
National team	Year	Apps	Goals
Wales	2017	2	0
Wales	2018	7	0
Wales	2019	3	1
Wales	2020	4	1
Wales	2021	5	0
Wales	2022	0	0
Wales	2023	6	1
Wales	2024	4	1
Wales	2025	10	2
Wales	2026	7	3
Total		48	9

As of match played 17 November 2026. Wales' score listed first, score column indicates score after each Brooks goal.

List of international goals scored by David Brooks
No.	Date	Venue	Cap	Opponent	Score	Result	Competition
1	8 June 2019	Stadion Gradski vrt, Osijek, Croatia	11	Croatia	1–2	1–2	UEFA Euro 2020 qualification
2	15 November 2020	Cardiff City Stadium, Cardiff, Wales	15	Republic of Ireland	1–0	1–0	2020–21 UEFA Nations League B
3	11 September 2023	Skonto Stadium, Riga, Latvia	24	Latvia	2–0	2–0	UEFA Euro 2024 qualification
4	21 March 2024	Cardiff City Stadium, Cardiff, Wales	28	Finland	1–0	4–1	UEFA Euro 2020 qualification
5	25 March 2025	Toše Proeski Arena, Skopje, North Macedonia	33	North Macedonia	1–1	1–1	2026 FIFA World Cup qualification
6	18 November 2025	Cardiff City Stadium, Cardiff, Wales	41	North Macedonia	2–1	7–1	2026 FIFA World Cup qualification
7	6 June 2026	Stadionul Steaua, Bucharest, Romania	45	Romania	1–1	1–2	Friendly
8	14 November 2026	Ullevaal Stadion, Oslo, Norway	47	Norway	1–2	1–3	2026–27 UEFA Nations League A
9	17 November 2026	Cardiff City Stadium, Cardiff, Wales	48	Portugal	1–1	2–3	2026–27 UEFA Nations League A

== Honours ==
Southampton

- EFL Championship play-offs: 2024

England U20

- Toulon Tournament: 2017

Individual

- Toulon Tournament Best player: 2017
- Toulon Tournament Best XI: 2017
- Welsh Footballer of the Year: 2018
- Premier League Goal of the Month: January 2025
