= Marcus Tavernier =

English footballer (born 1999)

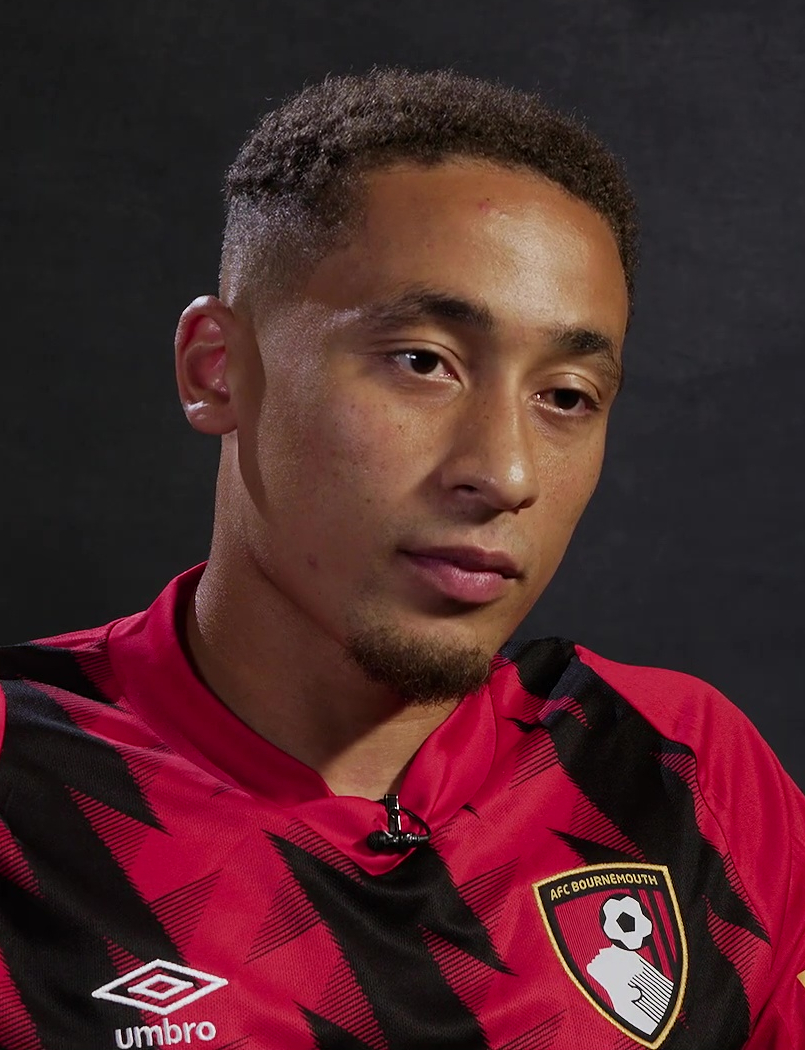
- Tavernier with Bournemouth in 2022

Personal information
- Full name: Marcus Joseph Tavernier
- Date of birth: 22 March 1999 (age 27)
- Place of birth: Leeds, England
- Height: 5 ft 10 in (1.77 m)
- Positions: Midfielder; winger

Team information
- Current team: Bournemouth
- Number: 16

Youth career
- Newcastle United
- 2013–2017: Middlesbrough

Senior career*
Years	Team	Apps	(Gls)
2017–2022	Middlesbrough	135	(18)
2018	→ Milton Keynes Dons (loan)	7	(0)
2022–	Bournemouth	126	(23)

International career
2017–2018	England U19	8	(1)
- * Club domestic league appearances and goals as of 15 November 2026

Marcus Joseph Tavernier (born 22 March 1999) is an English professional footballer who plays as a midfielder or winger for Premier League club Bournemouth. He has also represented England at U19 and U20 level.

== Club career ==
=== Middlesbrough ===
Tavernier was born in Leeds. Having previously played for Newcastle United, he joined the academy of Middlesbrough at under-14 level and became a regular for the side in the Premier League 2. He also played in two games for his club in the 2015–16 UEFA Youth League.

Tavernier made his professional debut for the club in the second round of the EFL Cup, starting in a 3–0 win against Scunthorpe United at the Riverside Stadium on 22 August 2017. He scored his first goal for the club on 24 October in the EFL Cup, during a 3–1 loss to Bournemouth at Dean Court, and his first league goal in the Championship in a 1–0 win over rivals Sunderland at the Riverside Stadium on 5 November.

On 17 January 2018, Tavernier joined relegation-threatened EFL League One side Milton Keynes Dons on loan until the end of the 2017–18 season. He made his debut for the club three days later in a 2–1 defeat to relegation rivals Northampton Town. The club were subsequently relegated to the fourth tier of English football at the end of their unsuccessful campaign, with Tavernier failing to score in any of his eight total appearances.

In December 2017, Tavernier signed a new contract for 3 1/2 years. In January 2020, this was extended until summer 2023.

=== Bournemouth ===
On 29 July 2022, Middlesbrough manager Chris Wilder confirmed that the club had accepted a bid for Tavernier from an unnamed Premier League club. On 1 August 2022, Tavernier joined Bournemouth on a five-year deal. Tavernier made his debut for the club on 6 August in a 2–0 home win over Aston Villa in the Premier League. He was praised by manager Scott Parker for his performance in the match. Later that year, on 5 November, he netted his first goal for the club in a 4–3 away defeat against Leeds United. On 16 June 2023, he signed a new deal until 2028.

On 23 August 2025, he netted his first goal in the 2025–26 season in a 1–0 victory over Wolverhampton Wanderers. A few weeks later, on 6 September, he extended his contract until 2029.

== International career ==
Tavernier made his international debut at U19 level, starting in a 2–2 draw against Slovakia U19s at the NTC Senec stadium on 9 October 2017. In July 2018, he was included in the squad for the 2018 UEFA European Under-19 Championship. He scored in a group stage draw against Ukraine.

In May 2019, he was included in the England U20 squad for the 2019 Toulon Tournament.

== Personal life ==
Tavernier was born in Leeds, West Yorkshire. His older brother, James Tavernier, is also a professional footballer. He most recently played for and captained Rangers, before leaving the club at the end of the 2025-26 Scottish Premiership season to Maccabi Tel Aviv

== Career statistics ==
As of match played 8 November 2026

Appearances and goals by club, season and competition
Club	Season	League			FA Cup		EFL Cup		Europe		Other		Total	
Club	Season	Division	Apps	Goals	Apps	Goals	Apps	Goals	Apps	Goals	Apps	Goals	Apps	Goals
Middlesbrough U23	2016–17	—			—		—		—		2 (Note: Appearances in EFL Trophy)	1	2	1
Middlesbrough	2017–18	Championship	5	1	0	0	3	1	—		—		8	2
Middlesbrough	2018–19	Championship	20	3	2	0	5	1	—		—		27	4
Middlesbrough	2019–20	Championship	37	3	2	0	1	0	—		—		40	3
Middlesbrough	2020–21	Championship	29	3	1	0	2	1	—		—		32	4
Middlesbrough	2021–22	Championship	44	5	4	0	0	0	—		—		48	5
Middlesbrough	Total		135	15	9	0	11	3	—		—		155	18
Milton Keynes Dons (loan)	2017–18	League One	7	0	1	0	—		—		—		8	0
Bournemouth	2022–23	Premier League	23	5	0	0	0	0	—		—		23	5
Bournemouth	2023–24	Premier League	30	3	3	1	2	0	—		—		35	4
Bournemouth	2024–25	Premier League	29	3	2	0	1	0	—		—		32	3
Bournemouth	2025–26	Premier League	34	7	1	1	0	0	—		—		35	8
Bournemouth	2026–27	Premier League	10	5	0	0	2	0	4 (Note: Appearances in UEFA Europa League)	1	—		16	6
Bournemouth	Total		126	23	6	2	5	0	4	1	—		141	26
Career total			268	38	16	2	16	3	4	1	2	1	306	45
