= Julio Soler =

Argentine footballer (born 2005)

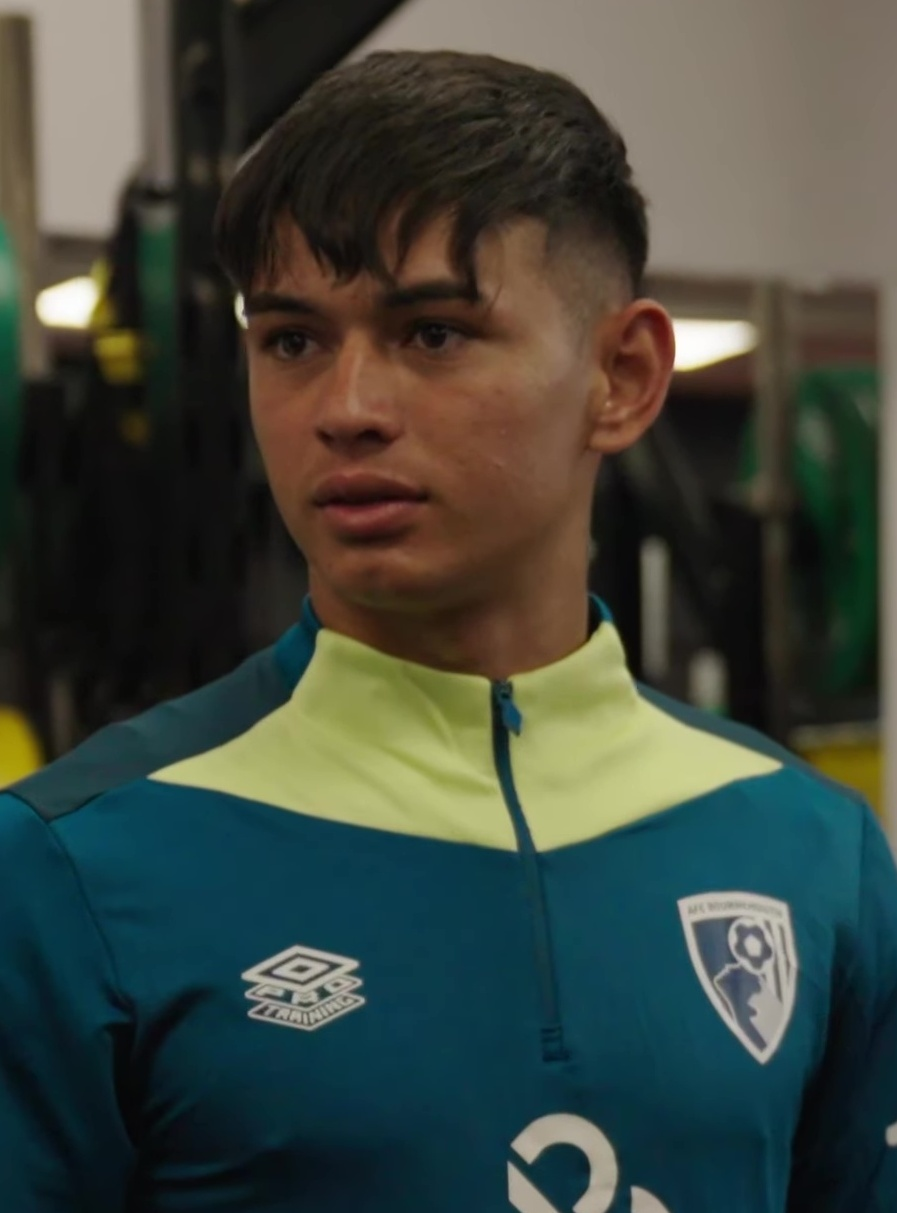
- Soler in 2025

Personal information
- Full name: Julio César Soler Barreto
- Date of birth: 16 February 2005 (age 21)
- Place of birth: Asunción, Paraguay
- Height: 1.75 m (5 ft 9 in)
- Position: Left-back

Team information
- Current team: Bournemouth
- Number: 6

Youth career
- Flores Club
- Argentinos Juniors
- 2014–2022: Lanús

Senior career*
Years	Team	Apps	(Gls)
2022–2025	Lanús	38	(1)
2025–	Bournemouth	6	(0)

International career^{‡}
2022–2024	Argentina U20	4	(0)
2024–	Argentina U23	5	(0)
Medal record
Men's football
Representing Argentina
FIFA U-20 World Cup
Runner-up	2025 Chile
South American U-20 Championship
Runner-up	2025 Venezuela
- * Club domestic league appearances and goals as of 14:30, 7 February 2026 (UTC) ‡ National team caps and goals as of 11:48, 8 January 2025 (UTC)

Julio César Soler Barreto (born 16 February 2005) is a professional footballer who plays as a left-back for Premier League club Bournemouth.

== Club career ==
A youth product of Flores Club and Argentinos Juniors, Soler moved to the academy of Lanús at the age of 9 where he finished his development. He made his senior and professional debut with Lanús in a 1–0 Argentine Primera División win over Independiente on 30 April 2022. On 28 June 2023, he signed a professional contract with the club until 2026.

=== Bournemouth ===
On 7 January 2025, Soler signed for Premier League club Bournemouth on a long-term contract for £6.6 million and could potentially be worth £11.5 million. He made his debut for the club on 11 January 2025, in a 5–1 win against West Bromwich Albion in the FA Cup.

== International career ==
Born in Asunción, Paraguay to Paraguayan parents, Soler moved to Argentina at a young age. He is a youth international player for Argentina, having played for the Argentina U20s where he was captain. He made the final squad for the Argentina U23s at the 2024 Summer Olympics.

== Career statistics ==
As of match played 8 September 2026

Appearances and goals by club, season and competition
Club	Season	League			National cup (Note: Includes Copa Argentina, FA Cup)		League cup (Note: Includes Copa de la Liga Profesional, EFL Cup)		Continental		Other		Total	
Club	Season	Division	Apps	Goals	Apps	Goals	Apps	Goals	Apps	Goals	Apps	Goals	Goals	Apps
Lanús	2022	Primera División	13	0	0	0	1	0	0	0	—		14	0
Lanús	2023	Primera División	6	1	0	0	9	0	—		—		15	0
Lanús	2024	Primera División	19	0	1	0	12	0	11 (Note: Appearances in Copa Sudamericana)	0	—		43	0
Lanús	Total		38	1	1	0	22	0	11	0	—		72	1
Bournemouth	2024–25	Premier League	3	0	2	0	—		—		—		5	0
Bournemouth	2025–26	Premier League	3	0	1	0	1	0	—		—		5	0
Bournemouth	2026–27	Premier League	0	0	0	0	1	0	0	0	—		1	0
Bournemouth	Total		6	0	3	0	2	0	0	0	—		11	0
Career total			44	1	4	0	24	0	11	0	—		83	1
