= Remy Rees-Dottin =

English footballer (born 2006)

Personal information
- Full name: Remy William James Rees-Dottin
- Date of birth: 6 March 2006 (age 20)
- Position: Winger

Team information
- Current team: Čukarički
- Number: 51

Youth career
- –2018: Southampton
- 2018–2026: Bournemouth

Senior career*
Years	Team	Apps	(Gls)
2023–2026	Bournemouth	1	(0)
2023	→ Wimborne Town (loan)	2	(0)
2023	→ Poole Town (loan)	2	(0)
2026–	Čukarički	2	(1)
- * Club domestic league appearances and goals as of 28 September 2026

Remy William James Rees-Dottin (born 6 March 2006) is an English professional footballer who plays as a winger for Serbian SuperLiga side Čukarički.

== Career ==
Rees-Dottin spent time with Southampton before joining Bournemouth at under-12 level. Described as a winger capable of playing on either flank, be signed an academy contract at AFC Bournemouth in May 2022. During the 2023–24 season he spent time on loan at Poole Town and Wimborne Town.

He began training with the Bournemouth first-team squad in late 2024 and was included in the match-day squad for the first time in a Premier League match against Fulham in December 2024. He made his professional debut on 11 January 2025 in the FA Cup against West Bromwich Albion. The following weekend he made his Premier League debut away against Newcastle United as a second-half substitute in a 4–1 win.

On 8 September 2026, he signed for Serbian SuperLiga side Čukarički on a permanent contract.
