= George Chubinidze =

Georgian footballer (born 2007)

Personal information
- Full name: George Manuel Gonçalves Chubinidze
- Date of birth: 11 September 2007 (age 19)
- Place of birth: London, England
- Height: 5 ft 10 in (1.78 m)
- Positions: Midfielder; winger

Team information
- Current team: Bournemouth

Youth career
- 2020–2026: Bournemouth

Senior career*
Years	Team	Apps	(Gls)
2026–	Bournemouth	0	(0)
2026	→ Dorchester Town (loan)	10	(3)

International career^{‡}
2023–2024	Georgia U17	11	(1)
2025–	Georgia U19	5	(0)
2026–	Georgia U21	1	(0)
- * Club domestic league appearances and goals ‡ National team caps and goals as of 29 September 2026

George Manuel Gonçalves Chubinidze (Georgian: გიორგი ჩუბინიძე: born 11 September 2007) is a professional footballer who plays as a midfielder or winger for Bournemouth. Born in England, he is a Georgia youth international.

== Early life ==
Chubinidze was born on 11 September 2007 in Winchester, to a Portuguese mother and a Georgian father.

== Club career ==
As a youth player, Chubinidze joined the youth academy of English side Bournemouth in 2020. Subsequently, he was sent on loan to English side Dorchester Town in 2026.

== International career ==
Chubinidze was born in England to a Georgian father and Portuguese mother of Cape Verdean descent. He was eligible to play for all four senior teams.

Chubinidze is a Georgia youth international. During the autumn of 2023 and the spring of 2024, he played for the Georgia national under-17 football team for 2024 UEFA European Under-17 Championship qualification.

== Style of play ==
Chubinidze plays as a midfielder or winger. English newspaper Bournemouth Echo wrote in 2026 that he is "a constant threat down the right wing... [with his] his pace and skill... also not afraid to do the hard work constantly tracking back".
