= Álex Jiménez (footballer, born 2005) =

Spanish footballer (born 2005)

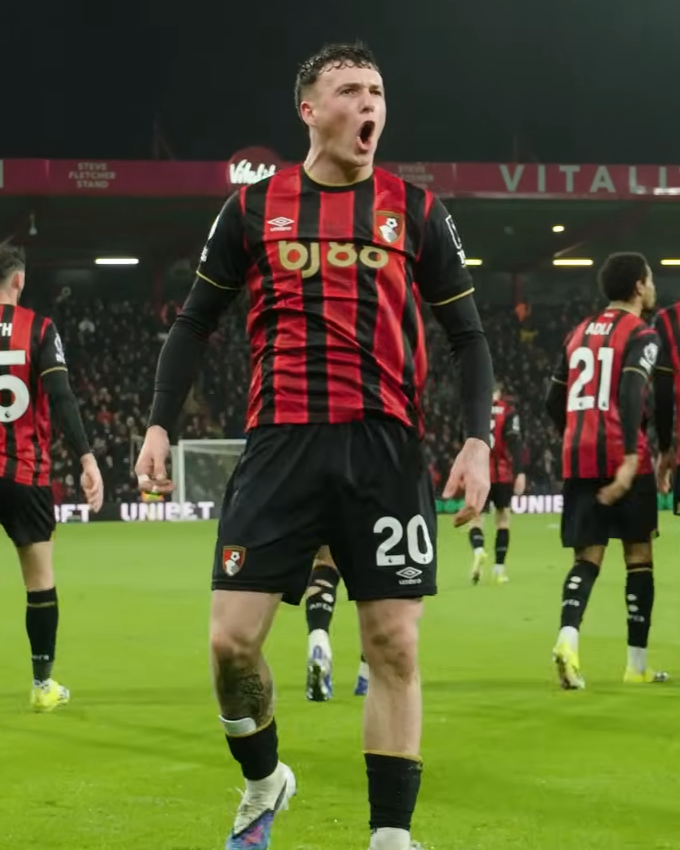
- Jiménez in 2025

Personal information
- Full name: Alejandro Jiménez Sánchez
- Date of birth: 8 May 2005 (age 21)
- Place of birth: Leganés, Spain
- Height: 1.77 m (5 ft 10 in)
- Positions: Full-back; wing-back; wide midfielder

Team information
- Current team: Fiorentina (on loan from Bournemouth)
- Number: 20

Youth career
- 2010–2011: Talavera CF
- 2011–2012: UD Talavera
- 2012–2022: Real Madrid

Senior career*
Years	Team	Apps	(Gls)
2022–2024	Real Madrid Castilla	7	(0)
2023–2024	→ AC Milan (loan)	3	(0)
2024–2025	Milan Futuro (res.)	15	(2)
2024–2026	AC Milan	23	(0)
2025–2026	→ Bournemouth (loan)	19	(1)
2026–	Bournemouth	12	(0)
2026–	→ Fiorentina (loan)	7	(2)

International career^{‡}
2020	Spain U15	3	(1)
2021–2022	Spain U17	9	(0)
2022–2024	Spain U19	2	(0)
2025–	Spain U21	4	(0)
- * Club domestic league appearances and goals as of 15:46, 26 October 2026 (UTC) ‡ National team caps and goals as of 27 March 2026

Alejandro "Álex" Jiménez Sánchez (born 8 May 2005) is a Spanish professional footballer who plays as a full-back, wing-back or wide midfielder for Serie A club Fiorentina, on loan from Premier League club Bournemouth.

== Club career ==
=== Real Madrid ===
Born in Leganés, Madrid and raised in Talavera de la Reina, Jiménez started his career with local sides Talavera and UD Talavera. He joined Real Madrid in 2012, and initially started his career as a forward, before moving to right-wing, and eventually turning into a left back.

Despite this interest, he signed his first professional contract with Los Blancos until 2027, making him one of the highest paid Castilla players.

=== AC Milan ===
On 25 July 2023, Jiménez was loaned to Italian club AC Milan for the 2023–24 season with an option to make the move permanent, he initially joined the under-19 roster. After having been training with the AC Milan senior team, he received his first call-up for the 1–0 Serie A home loss match against Juventus on 23 October 2023 featuring in the bench but yet to make his debut.

Jiménez made his debut and first start for AC Milan on 2 January 2024 against Cagliari in a 4–1 Coppa Italia home win match.

On 25 March 2024, AC Milan activated the buy-option clause on the deal with Real Madrid for Jiménez making the move permanent for a €5,000,000 estimated fee, with Real Madrid securing a future buy-back clause for a higher fee.

He made his debut for the newly created reserve team Milan Futuro on 10 August 2024, starting and scoring the second and third goals of a 3–0 away win Coppa Italia Serie C first round match against Lecco.

==== Loan to Bournemouth ====
On 1 September 2025, Jiménez joined Premier League club Bournemouth, on an initial one-year loan deal with an obligation to buy at the end of the season. He scored his first Bournemouth goal at home against Liverpool in a 3-2 victory.

=== Bournemouth ===
On 12 February 2026, Bournemouth activated the buy clause for Jiménez, with the permanent move becoming official on 1 July, signing a five-and-half-year deal with The Cherries until 2031.

==== Loan to Fiorentina ====
On 16 July 2026, Jiménez joined Serie A side Fiorentina on loan with an option to buy.

== International career ==
Jiménez has represented Spain at youth international levels, featuring for the U15s, U17s and the U19s.

== Style of play ==
Jiménez is also noted for his rapid pace, anticipation and wide passing range. He once named Trent Alexander-Arnold as a player he admires.

== Controversy ==
On 8 May 2026, Bournemouth issued a statement addressing circulating social media posts that showed Jiménez making inappropriate online contact with a 15-year-old girl, with the club saying that Jiménez would be omitted from the squad while the matter undergoes investigation.

== Career statistics ==
=== Club ===
As of match played 25 October 2026

Appearances and goals by club, season and competition
Club	Season	League			National cup (Note: Includes Coppa Italia, Coppa Italia Serie C, FA Cup)		League cup		Europe		Other		Total	
Club	Season	Division	Apps	Goals	Apps	Goals	Apps	Goals	Apps	Goals	Apps	Goals	Apps	Goals
Real Madrid Castilla	2022–23	Primera Federación	7	0	—		—		—		0	0	7	0
AC Milan (loan)	2023–24	Serie A	3	0	2	0	—		0	0	—		5	0
AC Milan	2024–25	Serie A	22	0	4	0	—		0	0	2 (Note: Appearances in Supercoppa Italiana)	0	28	0
AC Milan	2025–26	Serie A	1	0	0	0	—		—		—		1	0
AC Milan	Milan total		26	0	6	0	—		0	0	2	0	34	0
Milan Futuro	2024–25	Serie C	15	2	3	2	—		—		—		18	4
Bournemouth (Note: Part of the season spent on loan from AC Milan)	2025–26	Premier League	31	1	1	0	—		—		—		32	1
Fiorentina (loan)	2026–27	Serie A	7	2	1	0	—		—		—		8	2
Career total			86	5	11	2	0	0	0	0	2	0	99	7

== Honours ==
AC Milan

- Supercoppa Italiana: 2024–25
