= 2023–24 AFC Bournemouth season =

122nd season in existence of AFC Bournemouth

Bournemouth
2023–24 season
- Owner: Black Knight Football Club
- Chairman: Bill Foley
- Head coach: Andoni Iraola
- Stadium: Dean Court
- Premier League: 12th
- FA Cup: Fifth round
- EFL Cup: Fourth round
- Top goalscorer: League: Dominic Solanke (19); All: Dominic Solanke (21)
- Highest home attendance: 11,229 v Manchester United, Premier League, 13 April 2024
- Lowest home attendance: 10,166 v Swansea City, FA Cup, 25 January 2024
- Average home league attendance: 11,108
- Biggest win: 5–0 v Swansea City, FA Cup, 25 January 2024
- Biggest defeat: 1–6 v Manchester City, Premier League, 4 November 2023
Home colours	Away colours	Third colours

The 2023–24 season was the 122nd season in the history of AFC Bournemouth, and their second consecutive season in the Premier League, making it their seventh season in the top flight overall. In addition to the domestic league, the club also participated in the FA Cup and the EFL Cup.

== Players ==
No.	Player	Position	Nationality	Place of birth	Date of birth (age)	Signed from	Date signed	Fee	Contract end
Goalkeepers
1	Neto	GK	(Brazil)	Araxá	19 July 1989 (age 37)	(Spain) Barcelona	7 August 2022	Free transfer	30 June 2026
12	Darren Randolph	GK	(Republic of Ireland)	Bray	12 May 1987 (age 39)	West Ham United	26 January 2023	Free transfer	30 June 2024
20	Ionuț Radu	GK	(Romania)	Bucharest	28 May 1997 (age 29)	(Italy) Inter Milan	27 July 2023	Loan	31 May 2024
42	Mark Travers	GK	(Republic of Ireland)	Maynooth	18 May 1999 (age 27)	(Republic of Ireland) Shamrock Rovers	6 July 2016	Undisclosed	30 June 2027
	Callan McKenna	GK	(Scotland)	Rutherglen	22 December 2006 (age 19)	(Scotland) Queen's Park	1 February 2024	£300,000	
Defenders
2	Ryan Fredericks	RB	(England)	Hammersmith	10 October 1992 (age 34)	West Ham United	1 July 2022	Free transfer	30 June 2024
3	Milos Kerkez	LB	(Hungary)	(Federal Republic of Yugoslavia) Vrbas	7 November 2003 (age 23)	(Netherlands) AZ	20 July 2023	£15,500,000	30 June 2027
5	Lloyd Kelly	CB	(England)	Bristol	6 October 1998 (age 28)	Bristol City	1 July 2019	£13,000,000	30 June 2024
6	Chris Mepham	CB	(Wales)	(England) Harrow	5 November 1997 (age 29)	Brentford	22 January 2019	£12,000,000	30 June 2025
15	Adam Smith	RB	(England)	Leytonstone	29 April 1991 (age 35)	Tottenham Hotspur	28 January 2014	Undisclosed	30 June 2025
23	James Hill	CB	(England)	Bristol	10 January 2002 (age 24)	Fleetwood Town	5 January 2022	£1,000,000	30 June 2026
25	Marcos Senesi	CB	(Argentina)	Concordia	10 May 1997 (age 29)	(Netherlands) Feyenoord	8 August 2022	£13,500,000	30 June 2026
27	Illia Zabarnyi	CB	(Ukraine)	Kyiv	1 September 2002 (age 24)	(Ukraine) Dynamo Kyiv	31 January 2023	£24,000,000	30 June 2028
35	Owen Bevan	CB	(Wales)	(England) Winchester	26 October 2003 (age 23)	Academy	1 July 2022	—N/a	30 June 2024
37	Max Aarons	RB	(England)	Hammersmith	4 January 2000 (age 26)	Norwich City	10 August 2023	£7,000,000	30 June 2027
48	Max Kinsey	CB	(England)		2 February 2005 (age 21)	Southampton	1 July 2021	Free	30 June 2024
Midfielders
4	Lewis Cook	CM	(England)	York	3 February 1997 (age 29)	Leeds United	8 July 2016	£6,000,000	30 June 2026
8	Romain Faivre	RM	(France)	Asnières-sur-Seine	14 July 1998 (age 28)	(France) Lyon	13 July 2023	£12,800,000	30 June 2027
10	Ryan Christie	AM	(Scotland)	Inverness	22 February 1995 (age 31)	(Scotland) Celtic	31 August 2021	£2,500,000	30 June 2027
14	Alex Scott	CM	(England)	Guernsey	21 August 2003 (age 23)	Bristol City	10 August 2023	£25,000,000	30 June 2028
16	Marcus Tavernier	LM	(England)	Leeds	22 March 1999 (age 27)	Middlesbrough	1 August 2022	£12,500,000	30 June 2027
18	Tyler Adams	DM	(United States)	Wappinger	14 February 1999 (age 27)	Leeds United	20 August 2023	£23,000,000	30 June 2028
29	Philip Billing	CM	(Denmark)	Copenhagen	11 June 1996 (age 30)	Huddersfield Town	29 July 2019	£15,000,000	30 June 2027
49	Dominic Sadi	CM	(England)	Enfield	2 September 2003 (age 23)	West Ham United	1 July 2022	Free transfer	30 June 2024
Forwards
9	Dominic Solanke	CF	(England)	Reading	14 September 1997 (age 29)	Liverpool	4 January 2019	£19,000,000	30 June 2027
11	Dango Ouattara	RW	(Burkina Faso)	Ouagadougou	11 February 2002 (age 24)	(France) Lorient	19 January 2023	£20,000,000	30 June 2028
17	Luis Sinisterra	LW	(Colombia)	Santander de Quilichao	17 June 1999 (age 27)	Leeds United	9 February 2024	£20,000,000	
19	Justin Kluivert	LW	(Netherlands)	Amsterdam	5 May 1999 (age 27)	(Italy) Roma	23 June 2023	£9,500,000	30 June 2027
24	Antoine Semenyo	CF	(Ghana)	(England) London	7 January 2000 (age 26)	Bristol City	27 January 2023	£10,500,000	30 June 2027
26	Enes Ünal	FW	(Turkey)	Osmangazi	10 May 1997 (age 29)	(Spain) Getafe	1 February 2024	Loan	30 June 2024
Out on loan
7	David Brooks	RW	(Wales)	(England) Warrington	8 July 1997 (age 29)	Sheffield United	1 July 2018	£11,500,000	30 June 2026
13	Emiliano Marcondes	AM	(Denmark)	Hvidovre	9 March 1995 (age 31)	Brentford	3 July 2021	Free transfer	30 June 2024
21	Kieffer Moore	CF	(Wales)	(England) Torquay	8 August 1992 (age 34)	(Wales) Cardiff City	31 January 2022	£5,000,000	30 June 2025
22	Hamed Traorè	AM	(Ivory Coast)	Abidjan	16 February 2000 (age 26)	(Italy) Sassuolo	1 July 2023	£20,000,000	30 June 2027
32	Jaidon Anthony	LW	(England)	Hackney	1 December 1999 (age 26)	Arsenal	1 July 2016	Free transfer	30 June 2027
40	Will Dennis	GK	(England)		10 July 2000 (age 26)	Academy	1 August 2021	—N/a	30 June 2026
43	Ben Greenwood	LB	(Republic of Ireland)	(England) Frimley	20 February 2003 (age 23)	Academy	1 July 2020	—N/a	30 June 2024
51	Daniel Adu-Adjei	FW	(England)		21 June 2005 (age 21)	Academy	21 February 2023	—N/a	30 June 2025
—N/a	Gavin Kilkenny	CM	(Republic of Ireland)	Dublin	1 February 2000 (age 26)	(Republic of Ireland) St. Kevin's Boys	1 August 2016	Free transfer	30 June 2025
—N/a	Jamal Lowe	RW	(Jamaica)	(England) Harrow	21 July 1994 (age 32)	(Wales) Swansea City	31 August 2021	£1,500,000	30 June 2024
—N/a	Joe Rothwell	CM	(England)	Manchester	11 January 1995 (age 31)	Blackburn Rovers	1 July 2022	Free transfer	30 June 2026

== Transfers ==
=== In ===
Date	Pos.	Player	Transferred from	Fee	Ref.
23 June 2023	LW	(Netherlands) Justin Kluivert	(Italy) Roma	£9,500,000	
1 July 2023	AM	(Ivory Coast) Hamed Traorè	(Italy) Sassuolo	£20,000,000	
13 July 2023	RM	(France) Romain Faivre	(France) Lyon	£12,800,000	
20 July 2023	LB	(Hungary) Milos Kerkez	(Netherlands) AZ	£15,500,000	
10 August 2023	CM	(England) Alex Scott	(England) Bristol City	£25,000,000	
10 August 2023	RB	(England) Max Aarons	(England) Norwich City	£7,000,000	
20 August 2023	DM	(United States) Tyler Adams	(England) Leeds United	£23,000,000	
1 February 2024	GK	(Scotland) Callan McKenna	(Scotland) Queen's Park	£300,000	
9 February 2024	LW	(Colombia) Luis Sinisterra	(England) Leeds United	£20,000,000	

=== Out ===
Date	Pos.	Player	Transferred to	Fee	Ref.
14 June 2023	CF	(England) Christian Saydee	(England) Portsmouth	Undisclosed	
30 June 2023	LB	(Zimbabwe) Jordan Zemura	(Italy) Udinese	Free	
8 July 2023	CM	(England) Ben Pearson	(England) Stoke City	Undisclosed	
14 July 2023	LW	(Scotland) Siriki Dembélé	(England) Birmingham City	Undisclosed	
27 January 2024	CM	(Guyana) Nathan Moriah-Welsh	(Scotland) Hibernian	Undisclosed	

=== Loaned in ===
Date	Pos.	Player	Loaned from	Until	Ref.
27 July 2023	GK	(Romania) Ionuț Radu	(Italy) Inter Milan	End of Season	
1 September 2023	LW	(Colombia) Luis Sinisterra	(England) Leeds United	9 February 2024 (Note: On 9 February 2024, the club made the transfer permanent.)	
1 February 2024	CF	(Turkey) Enes Ünal	(Spain) Getafe	End of Season	

=== Loaned out ===
Date	Pos.	Player	Loaned to	Until	Ref.
1 July 2023	GK	(England) Will Dennis	(Scotland) Kilmarnock	End of Season	
13 July 2023	RM	(France) Romain Faivre	(France) Lorient	31 January 2024 (Note: On 31 January, Faivre was recalled from his season-long loan at Lorient.)	
27 July 2023	GK	(England) Billy Terrell	(England) Dover Athletic	9 January 2024 (Note: On 9 January, Terrell was recalled from his season-long loan at Dover. He was subsequently loaned to Dartford.)	
27 July 2023	GK	(Republic of Ireland) Mark Travers	(England) Stoke City	27 October 2023 (Note: On 27 October, Travers was recalled from his season-long loan at Stoke.)	
19 August 2023	LW	(England) Baylin Johnson	(Italy) Lecce	9 January 2024 (Note: On 9 January, Johnson was recalled from his season-long loan at Lecce.)	
19 August 2023	DM	(England) Ben Winterburn	(England) AFC Totton	End of Season	
25 August 2023	CB	(Wales) Owen Bevan	(England) Cheltenham Town	2 January 2024 (Note: On 2 January, Bevan was recalled from his season-long loan at Cheltenham due to injury. He was subsequently loaned to Hibernian.)	
31 August 2023	CB	(England) James Hill	(England) Blackburn Rovers	10 January 2024 (Note: On 10 January, Hill was recalled from his season-long loan at Blackburn.)	
1 September 2023	LW	(England) Jaidon Anthony	(England) Leeds United	End of Season	
1 September 2023	RW	(Jamaica) Jamal Lowe	(Wales) Swansea City	End of Season	
20 September 2023	GK	(England) Mack Allan	(England) Hythe & Dibden	End of Season	
17 November 2023	LB	(Wales) Archie Harris	(England) Torquay United	16 December 2023	
5 January 2024	AM	(England) Ferdinand Okoh	(England) Hayes & Yeading United	End of Season	
9 January 2024	GK	(England) Billy Terrell	(England) Dartford	End of Season	
12 January 2024	CM	(England) Jack Wadham	(England) Worthing	End of Season	
15 January 2024	CM	(England) Joe Rothwell	(England) Southampton	End of Season	
17 January 2024	AM	(Ivory Coast) Hamed Traorè	(Italy) Napoli	End of Season	
22 January 2024	AM	(Denmark) Emiliano Marcondes	(Scotland) Hibernian	End of Season	
30 January 2024	RW	(Wales) David Brooks	(England) Southampton	End of Season	
1 February 2024	CF	(England) Daniel Adu-Adjei	(England) Leyton Orient	End of Season	
1 February 2024	CB	(Wales) Owen Bevan	(Scotland) Hibernian	23 February 2024 (Note: On 23 February, Bevan was recalled from his loan at Hibernian due to injury.)	
1 February 2024	LB	(Republic of Ireland) Ben Greenwood	(England) Eastleigh	End of Season	
1 February 2024	CM	(Republic of Ireland) Gavin Kilkenny	(England) Fleetwood Town	End of Season	
1 February 2024	CF	(Wales) Kieffer Moore	(England) Ipswich Town	End of Season	
19 March 2024	CF	(England) Jonny Stuttle	(England) Wimborne Town	30 April 2024	
28 March 2024	CB	(England) Harry Redknapp	(England) Dorchester Town	30 April 2024	
31 March 2024	DM	(England) Ben Winterburn	(England) Weymouth	30 April 2024	

=== Released ===
Date	Pos.	Player	Subsequent club	Join date	Ref.
30 June 2023	DM	(Colombia) Jefferson Lerma	(England) Crystal Palace	1 July 2023	
30 June 2023	RB	(England) Jack Stacey	(England) Norwich City	1 July 2023	
30 June 2023	CB	(England) Josh Popoola	(England) Stockport County	31 July 2023	
30 June 2023	CB	(England) Chris Francis	(England) Crystal Palace	1 August 2023	
30 June 2023	RB	(England) Brooklyn Genesini	(England) Swindon Town	8 August 2023	
30 June 2023	CM	(England) Matt Burgess	(England) Bognor Regis	11 August 2023	
30 June 2023	GK	(Wales) Oliver Camis	Currently unattached		
30 June 2023	RW	(Northern Ireland) Marcus Daws	Currently unattached		
30 June 2023	RB	(England) Tarik Gidaree	Currently unattached		
30 June 2023	LW	(England) Junior Stanislas	None (Retired)		

== Pre-season and friendlies ==
On 16 June, Bournemouth announced two home friendlies, against Lorient and Atalanta. A day later, two further friendlies were added along with a training camp in Marbella. A fifth friendly was also added to the pre-season schedule, against Southampton.

Win Draw Loss Fixtures

13 July 2023 Friendly	Bournemouth (England)	4–0	(Scotland) Hibernian	Marbella, Spain
18:00 CEST; 17:00 BST	Brooks 6'; Anthony 13'; Billing 67', 86'	Report		Stadium: Marbella Football Center

16 July 2023 Friendly	Maccabi Tel Aviv (Israel)	1–0	(England) Bournemouth	Marbella, Spain
18:00 CEST; 17:00 BST	Abu Farhi 85'	Report		Stadium: Marbella Football Center; Attendance: 0 (Behind closed doors)

25 July 2023 Friendly	Southampton	2–3	Bournemouth	Southampton
19:45 BST	Charles 44'; S. Armstrong 65'	Report	Ouattara 15'; Christie 17'; Brooks 86'	Stadium: St Mary's Stadium; Attendance: 13,049; Referee: James Linington

29 July 2023 Friendly	Bournemouth (England)	1–3	(Italy) Atalanta	Bournemouth
15:00 BST	Senesi 38'	Report	Mæhle 7'; Koopmeiners 36'; Latte Lath 86'	Stadium: Dean Court; Referee: Craig Pawson (England)

5 August 2023 Friendly	Bournemouth (England)	2–0	(France) Lorient	Bournemouth
17:00 BST	Brooks 37'; Moore 85'	Report		Stadium: Dean Court; Referee: Andrew Madley

== Competitions ==
=== Overall record ===
Competition	First match	Last match	Starting round	Final position	Record							
Competition	First match	Last match	Starting round	Final position	Pld	W	D	L	GF	GA	GD	Win %
Premier League	12 August 2023	19 May 2024	Matchday 1	12th	38	13	9	16	54	67	−13	34.21
FA Cup	6 January 2024	27 February 2024	Third round	Fifth round	3	2	0	1	8	3	+5	66.67
EFL Cup	29 August 2023	1 November 2023	Second round	Fourth round	3	2	0	1	6	4	+2	66.67
Total					44	17	9	18	68	74	−6	38.64

Source: Soccerway

=== Premier League ===
==== League table ====
Pos	Team	Pld	W	D	L	GF	GA	GD	Pts
10	Crystal Palace	38	13	10	15	57	58	−1	49
11	Brighton & Hove Albion	38	12	12	14	55	62	−7	48
12	Bournemouth	38	13	9	16	54	67	−13	48
13	Fulham	38	13	8	17	55	61	−6	47
14	Wolverhampton Wanderers	38	13	7	18	50	65	−15	46

Source: Premier League
Rules for classification: 1) Points; 2) Goal difference; 3) Goals scored; 4) If the champions, relegated teams or qualified teams for UEFA competitions cannot be determined by rules 1 to 3, rules 4.1 to 4.3 are applied – 4.1) Points gained in head-to-head record between such teams; 4.2) Away goals scored in head-to-head record between such teams; 4.3) Play-offs

==== Results summary ====
Overall								Home						Away					
Pld	W	D	L	GF	GA	GD	Pts	W	D	L	GF	GA	GD	W	D	L	GF	GA	GD
38	13	9	16	54	67	−13	48	7	6	6	27	28	−1	6	3	10	27	39	−12

Source: Soccerway

==== Results by round ====
Round	1	2	3	4	5	6	7	8	9	10	11	12	13	14	15	16	18	19	20	21	22	23	24	25	26	27	28	17^{2}	30	31	32	33	34	29^{3}	35	36	37	38
Ground	H	A	H	A	H	A	H	A	H	H	A	H	A	H	A	A	A	H	A	H	A	H	A	A	H	A	H	H	H	H	A	H	A	A	H	A	H	A
Result	D	L	L	D	D	L	L	L	L	W	L	W	W	D	W	W	W	W	L	L	D	D	L	D	L	W	D	W	W	W	L	D	L	W	W	L	L	L
Position	10	14	16	16	15	17	18	19	19	17	18	16^{1}	16	16	15	14	12	12	12	12	12	12	13	13	14	13	13	13	13	12	12	13	13	10	10	10	11	12
Points	1	1	1	2	3	3	3	3	3	6	6	9	12	13	16	19	22	25	25	25	26	27	27	28	28	31	32	35	38	41	41	42	42	45	48	48	48	48

Source: Soccerway
- ^{1} Bournemouth were originally 17th at the end of Matchday 12. On 17 November 2023, Everton were deducted 10 points, subsequently bringing Bournemouth up to 16th.
- ^{2} Matchday 17 (vs Luton Town) was rescheduled and replayed in full due to a Tom Lockyer cardiac arrest which happened during the original match.
- ^{3} Matchday 29 (vs Wolverhampton Wanderers) was originally due to be played on 16 March 2024, but was postponed due to Wolves' involvement in the FA Cup.
A = Away; H = Home; W = Win; D = Draw; L = Loss

==== Matches ====
On 15 June 2023, the Premier League fixtures were released.

Win Draw Loss Fixtures

12 August 2023 1	Bournemouth	1–1	West Ham United	Bournemouth
15:00 BST	Solanke 82'; Mepham (yellow card) 90+7'	Report	Bowen (yellow card) 39', (goal) 51'; Antonio (yellow card) 49'; Emerson (yellow card) 87'; Paquetá (yellow card) 90+4'	Stadium: Dean Court; Attendance: 11,189; Referee: Peter Bankes

19 August 2023 2	Liverpool	3–1	Bournemouth	Liverpool
15:00 BST	Alisson (yellow card) 9'; Díaz 27'; Salah (penalty missed) 36', 36'; Mac Allister (red card) 58'; Jota 62'	Report	Semenyo 3', (yellow card) 16'; Anthony (yellow card) 26'; Neto (yellow card) 35'	Stadium: Anfield; Attendance: 49,699; Referee: Thomas Bramall

26 August 2023 3	Bournemouth	0–2	Tottenham Hotspur	Bournemouth
12:30 BST	Kelly (yellow card) 45+1'	Report	Maddison 17'; Bissouma (yellow card) 53'; Richarlison (yellow card) 54'; Kulusevski 63'; Perišić (yellow card) 71'	Stadium: Dean Court; Attendance: 10,567; Referee: Tim Robinson

2 September 2023 4	Brentford	2–2	Bournemouth	Brentford
15:00 BST	Jensen 7', (yellow card) 69'; Mbeumo 90+3'	Report	Solanke 30'; Aarons (yellow card) 51'; Neto (yellow card) 64'; Brooks 77'	Stadium: Brentford Community Stadium; Attendance: 16,973; Referee: Bobby Madley

17 September 2023 5	Bournemouth	0–0	Chelsea	Bournemouth
14:00 BST	Kerkez (yellow card) 62'	Report	Sterling (yellow card) 4'; Mudryk (yellow card) 41'; Disasi (yellow card) 76'; Jackson (yellow card) 80'; Chilwell (yellow card) 90+5'	Stadium: Dean Court; Attendance: 10,421; Referee: David Coote

24 September 2023 6	Brighton & Hove Albion	3–1	Bournemouth	Falmer
14:00 BST	Veltman (yellow card) 37'; Kerkez 45+2' (o.g.); Gilmour (yellow card) 45+3'; Mitoma 46', 77'; Dunk (yellow card) 75'	Report	Solanke 25'; Zabarnyi (yellow card) 41'; Brooks (yellow card) 89'; Senesi (yellow card) 90+6'	Stadium: Falmer Stadium; Attendance: 31,617; Referee: John Brooks

30 September 2023 7	Bournemouth	0–4	Arsenal	Bournemouth
15:00 BST		Report	Saka 17'; Havertz (yellow card) 33', (goal) 53' (pen.); Ødegaard 44' (pen.); White 90+3'	Stadium: Dean Court; Attendance: 11,193; Referee: Michael Salisbury

7 October 2023 8	Everton	3–0	Bournemouth	Walton
15:00 BST	Garner 8'; Young (yellow card) 11'; Harrison 37'; Doucouré 60'	Report	Solanke (yellow card) 58'; Neto (yellow card) 60'	Stadium: Goodison Park; Attendance: 38,815; Referee: David Coote

21 October 2023 9	Bournemouth	1–2	Wolverhampton Wanderers	Bournemouth
15:00 BST	Solanke 17'; Zabarnyi (yellow card) 34'; Scott (yellow card) 45+2'; Cook (red card) 54'	Report	Cunha (yellow card) 42', (goal) 47'; Kilman (yellow card) 45+3'; Hwang (yellow card) 54'; Traoré (yellow card) 83'; Kalajdžić 88'; Neto (yellow card) 89'; Sarabia (yellow card) 90+1'	Stadium: Dean Court; Attendance: 11,175; Referee: Paul Tierney

28 October 2023 10	Bournemouth	2–1	Burnley	Bournemouth
15:00 BST	Semenyo 22'; Billing 76', (yellow card) 77'; Ouattara (yellow card) 84'	Report	Taylor 11', (yellow card) 56'; Cullen (yellow card) 28'; Al-Dakhil (yellow card) 67'	Stadium: Dean Court; Attendance: 11,152; Referee: Sam Barrott

4 November 2023 11	Manchester City	6–1	Bournemouth	Manchester
15:00 GMT	Doku 30'; Silva 33', 83'; Akanji 37'; Foden 64'; Aké 88'	Report	Billing (yellow card) 32'; Sinisterra 74'	Stadium: City of Manchester Stadium; Attendance: 53,358; Referee: Craig Pawson

11 November 2023 12	Bournemouth	2–0	Newcastle United	Bournemouth
17:30 GMT	Cook (yellow card) 57'; Solanke 60', 73'; Senesi (yellow card) 86'	Report	Lascelles (yellow card) 85'	Stadium: Dean Court; Attendance: 11,201; Referee: Chris Kavanagh

25 November 2023 13	Sheffield United	1–3	Bournemouth	Sheffield
15:00 GMT	Norwood (yellow card) 22'; Thomas (yellow card) 51'; Baldock (yellow card) 69'; Robinson (yellow card) 70'; McBurnie 90+7'	Report	Tavernier 12', 51'; Kluivert 45+3'; Billing (yellow card) 70'	Stadium: Bramall Lane; Attendance: 30,208; Referee: Andrew Madley

3 December 2023 14	Bournemouth	2–2	Aston Villa	Bournemouth
14:00 GMT	Semenyo 10', (yellow card) 17'; Kluivert (yellow card) 12'; Senesi (yellow card) 45+4'; Solanke 52'; Christie (yellow card) 54'; Kerkez (yellow card) 84'	Report	Bailey 20'; Torres (yellow card) 30'; Zaniolo (yellow card) 43'; Durán (yellow card) 84'; Watkins 90'	Stadium: Dean Court; Attendance: 11,191; Referee: Thomas Bramall

6 December 2023 15	Crystal Palace	0–2	Bournemouth	Selhurst
19:30 GMT	Édouard (yellow card) 45'	Report	Senesi 25', (yellow card) 53'; Zabarnyi (yellow card) 63'; Ouattara (yellow card) 83'; Moore 90+1'	Stadium: Selhurst Park; Attendance: 24,104; Referee: Craig Pawson

9 December 2023 16	Manchester United	0–3	Bournemouth	Manchester
15:00 GMT	Reguilón (yellow card) 30'; Højlund (yellow card) 60'; Fernandes (yellow card) 84'	Report	Solanke 5'; Tavernier (yellow card) 27'; Billing 68'; Senesi 73'	Stadium: Old Trafford; Attendance: 73,427; Referee: Peter Bankes

23 December 2023 18	Nottingham Forest	2–3	Bournemouth	West Bridgford
15:00 GMT	Boly (yellow card) 5' (yellow-red card) 23'; Elanga 47'; Wood 74'	Report	Scott (yellow card) 31'; Solanke 51', 58', 90+4'; Semenyo (yellow card) 65'; Christie (yellow card) 68'	Stadium: City Ground; Attendance: 29,188; Referee: Robert Jones

26 December 2023 19	Bournemouth	3–0	Fulham	Bournemouth
15:00 GMT	Kluivert 44'; Solanke 62' (pen.); Sinisterra 90+3'	Report	Leno (yellow card) 62'; Pereira (yellow card) 62'	Stadium: Dean Court; Attendance: 11,099; Referee: Tim Robinson

31 December 2023 20	Tottenham Hotspur	3–1	Bournemouth	Tottenham
14:00 GMT	Sarr 9'; Skipp (yellow card) 56'; Son Heung-min 71'; Richarlison 80'; Emerson (yellow card) 87'; Lo Celso (yellow card) 90+3'	Report	Kluivert (yellow card) 25'; Senesi (yellow card) 79'; Scott 84'; Semenyo (yellow card) 84'	Stadium: Tottenham Hotspur Stadium; Attendance: 61,780; Referee: Simon Hooper

21 January 2024 21	Bournemouth	0–4	Liverpool	Bournemouth
16:30 GMT	Cook (yellow card) 59'	Report	Núñez 49', 90+3', (yellow card) 90+7'; Bradley (yellow card) 66'; Jota 70', 79'	Stadium: Dean Court; Attendance: 11,228; Referee: Andrew Madley

1 February 2024 22	West Ham United	1–1	Bournemouth	Stratford
19:30 GMT	Ward-Prowse 61' (pen.); Bowen (yellow card) 70'	Report	Solanke 3'; Christie (yellow card) 67'; Cook (yellow card) 83'; Faivre (yellow card) 90+7'	Stadium: London Stadium; Attendance: 62,451; Referee: Tim Robinson

4 February 2024 23	Bournemouth	1–1	Nottingham Forest	Bournemouth
14:00 GMT	Kluivert 5', (yellow card) 35'; Senesi (yellow card) 23'; Billing (red card) 84'; Neto (yellow card) 85'	Report	Hudson-Odoi 45'; Omobamidele (yellow card) 55'; Yates (yellow card) 73'	Stadium: Dean Court; Attendance: 11,200; Referee: Rebecca Welch

10 February 2024 24	Fulham	3–1	Bournemouth	Fulham
15:00 GMT	Decordova-Reid 6'; Muniz 36', 52'; Wilson (yellow card) 90+4'	Report	Senesi 50'; Solanke (yellow card) 62'; Smith (yellow card) 81'	Stadium: Craven Cottage; Attendance: 24,271; Referee: Darren England

17 February 2024 25	Newcastle United	2–2	Bournemouth	Newcastle
15:00 GMT	Gordon 58' (pen.); Schär (yellow card) 87'; Ritchie 90+2'	Report	Christie (yellow card) 44'; Solanke 51'; Senesi (yellow card) 52'; Zabarnyi (yellow card) 62'; Semenyo 69'	Stadium: St James' Park; Attendance: 52,224; Referee: Michael Salisbury

24 February 2024 26	Bournemouth	0–1	Manchester City	Bournemouth
17:30 GMT	Cook (yellow card) 38'; Senesi (yellow card) 70'	Report	Foden 24'; Silva (yellow card) 87'; De Bruyne (yellow card) 90+6'	Stadium: Dean Court; Attendance: 11,184; Referee: Jarred Gillett

3 March 2024 27	Burnley	0–2	Bournemouth	Burnley
13:00 GMT	O'Shea (yellow card) 1'; Vitinho (yellow card) 68'	Report	Kluivert 13', (yellow card) 44'; Semenyo (yellow card) 42', (goal) 88'; Tavernier (yellow card) 68'; Smith (yellow card) 84'	Stadium: Turf Moor; Attendance: 19,713; Referee: David Coote

9 March 2024 28	Bournemouth	2–2	Sheffield United	Bournemouth
15:00 GMT	Kerkez (yellow card) 10'; Solanke (penalty missed) 14'; Smith (yellow card) 15'; Ouattara 74'; Mepham (yellow card) 88'; Ünal 90+1'	Report	Hamer 27', (yellow card) 36'; McBurnie (yellow card) 61'; Robinson 64'; Grbić (yellow card) 72'; Brereton (yellow card) 80'; Norwood (yellow card) 88'	Stadium: Dean Court; Attendance: 11,074; Referee: Anthony Taylor

13 March 2024 17	Bournemouth	4–3	Luton Town	Bournemouth
19:30 GMT	Solanke 50'; Zabarnyi 62'; Semenyo 64', 83'; Smith (yellow card) 69'	Report	Chong 9'; Clark (yellow card) 30'; Ogbene 31', (yellow card) 66'; Barkley 45+1'	Stadium: Dean Court; Attendance: 11,198; Referee: Sam Allison
Note: This fixture is rearranged from the abandoned match from Matchweek 17 that originally took place on 16 December 2023.

30 March 2024 30	Bournemouth	2–1	Everton	Bournemouth
15:00 GMT	Solanke (yellow card) 30', (goal) 64'; Coleman 90+1' (o.g.)	Report	Onana (yellow card) 42'; Tarkowski (yellow card) 76'; Beto 87'	Stadium: Dean Court; Attendance: 11,207; Referee: Sam Barrott

2 April 2024 31	Bournemouth	1–0	Crystal Palace	Bournemouth
19:45 BST	Tavernier (yellow card) 63'; Semenyo (yellow card) 68'; Kluivert 79'; Kelly (yellow card) 90+3'	Report	Andersen (yellow card) 35'; Hughes (yellow card) 59'	Stadium: Dean Court; Attendance: 11,207; Referee: Graham Scott

6 April 2024 32	Luton Town	2–1	Bournemouth	Luton
15:00 BST	Clark 73'; Morris 90'	Report	Tavernier 52'	Stadium: Kenilworth Road; Attendance: 11,797; Referee: Andrew Madley

13 April 2024 33	Bournemouth	2–2	Manchester United	Bournemouth
17:30 BST	Solanke 16'; Senesi (yellow card) 33'; Kluivert 36'; Christie (yellow card) 86'; Cook (yellow card) 86'; Neto (yellow card) 90+1'	Report	Fernandes 31', 65' (pen.)	Stadium: Dean Court; Attendance: 11,229; Referee: Tony Harrington

21 April 2024 34	Aston Villa	3–1	Bournemouth	Aston
15:00 BST	Rogers 45+1'; Diaby 57'; Bailey 78'; Cash (yellow card) 87'	Report	Smith (yellow card) 21'; Solanke 31' (pen.); Senesi (yellow card) 37'; Zabarnyi (yellow card) 55'	Stadium: Villa Park; Attendance: 42,189; Referee: Tim Robinson

24 April 2024 29	Wolverhampton Wanderers	0–1	Bournemouth	Wolverhampton
19:45 BST	Semedo (yellow card) 23'; Aït-Nouri (yellow card) 44'; Doherty (yellow card) 61'; Cunha (yellow card) 69'	Report	Semenyo 37'; Kerkez (red card) 79'; Ünal (yellow card) 90+2'	Stadium: Molineux Stadium; Attendance: 25,541; Referee: Stuart Attwell
Note: Fixture was originally scheduled for 16 March, but was postponed due to Wolverhampton Wanderers' FA Cup involvement.

28 April 2024 35	Bournemouth	3–0	Brighton & Hove Albion	Bournemouth
14:00 BST	Senesi (yellow card) 8', (goal) 13'; Ünal 52'; Kluivert (yellow card) 57', (goal) 87'	Report	Gilmour (yellow card) 59'; Barco (yellow card) 66'	Stadium: Dean Court; Attendance: 11,188; Referee: Paul Tierney

4 May 2024 36	Arsenal	3–0	Bournemouth	Holloway
12:30 BST	Saka 45' (pen.); Partey (yellow card) 59'; Havertz (yellow card) 60'; Trossard 70'; Rice 90+7'	Report	Scott (yellow card) 21'; Smith (yellow card) 84'; Christie (yellow card) 90+5'	Stadium: Emirates Stadium; Attendance: 60,348; Referee: David Coote

11 May 2024 37	Bournemouth	1–2	Brentford	Bournemouth
15:00 BST	Senesi (yellow card) 45+1'; Ouattara (yellow card) 56'; Solanke 89'	Report	Jensen (yellow card) 85'; Mbeumo 86'; Wissa 90+5'; Toney (yellow card) 90+8'	Stadium: Dean Court; Attendance: 11,154; Referee: Matt Donohue

19 May 2024 38	Chelsea	2–1	Bournemouth	Fulham
16:00 BST	Caicedo 17'; Cucurella (yellow card) 27'; Sterling 48'; Gusto (yellow card) 78'	Report	Semenyo (yellow card) 27'; Kerkez (yellow card) 30'; Badiashile 49' (o.g.); Senesi (yellow card) 80'	Stadium: Stamford Bridge; Attendance: 39,724; Referee: Anthony Taylor

==== Abandoned match with Luton Town ====
On 16 December 2023, during the match at home against Luton Town, defender Tom Lockyer of Luton Town collapsed due to a cardiac arrest in the 59th minute of the match resulting in the match being abandoned in the 65th minute. On 20 December 2023, the Premier League ruled the match would be replayed in full at a later date. On 7 February 2024, it was announced that the rearranged fixture would take place on 13 March 2024.

16 December 2023 17	Bournemouth	1–1; Abandoned	Luton Town	Bournemouth
15:00 GMT	Solanke 58'		Adebayo 3'; Doughty (yellow card) 12'	Stadium: Dean Court; Attendance: 11,185; Referee: Simon Hooper

=== FA Cup ===
Bournemouth were drawn away to EFL Championship side Queens Park Rangers in the third round. They were drawn at home against another Championship side, Swansea City, in the fourth round, having previously faced The Swans in the second round of the season's EFL Cup. They were given another home tie against a Championship side in the fifth round, this time being drawn against Leicester City, where they were eliminated from the competition after losing in extra time.

Win Draw Loss Fixtures

6 January 2024 Third round	Queens Park Rangers	2–3	Bournemouth	Shepherd's Bush
15:00 GMT	Armstrong 40'; Dykes 42'	Report	Billing (yellow card) 17'; Tavernier 48'; Moore 58'; Aarons (yellow card) 59'; Kluivert 69'; Cook (yellow card) 87'	Stadium: Loftus Road; Attendance: 10,725; Referee: Rebecca Welch

25 January 2024 Fourth round	Bournemouth	5–0	Swansea City	Bournemouth
19:45 GMT	Kelly 7'; Scott 10', (yellow card) 79'; Sinisterra 14'; Brooks 35'; Solanke 44', (yellow card) 45'	Report	Wood (yellow card) 6'; Ashby (yellow card) 63'; Allen (yellow card) 66'; Fulton (yellow card) 76'	Stadium: Dean Court; Attendance: 10,166; Referee: Darren England

27 February 2024 Fifth round	Bournemouth	0–1 (a.e.t.)	Leicester City	Bournemouth
19:30 GMT	Ünal (yellow card) 35'; Senesi (yellow card) 57'; Scott (yellow card) 87'; Kluivert (yellow card) 109'	Report	Raikhy (yellow card) 37'; Doyle (yellow card) 51'; Fatawu (yellow card) 96', (goal) 105'; Pereira (yellow card) 112'; Justin (yellow card) 115'	Stadium: Dean Court; Attendance: 10,872; Referee: Paul Tierney

=== EFL Cup ===
Bournemouth entered the competition in the second round, and were drawn away to Swansea City. They were then drawn at home to Stoke City in the third round, and at home to Liverpool in the fourth round, where they were eliminated from the competition after defeat.

Win Draw Loss Fixtures

29 August 2023 Second round	Swansea City	2–3	Bournemouth	Landore
19:30 BST	Grimes 9' (pen.); Ginnelly (yellow card) 24'; Abdulai (yellow card) 52'; Naughton (yellow card) 53'; Paterson 79'	Report	Brooks (yellow card) 21', (goal) 55'; Senesi (yellow card) 39'; Traorè 68'; Solanke (yellow card) 86'; Christie 90+1'; Kerkez (yellow card) 90+5'	Stadium: Swansea.com Stadium; Attendance: 8,785; Referee: Matt Donohue

27 September 2023 Third round	Bournemouth	2–0	Stoke City	Bournemouth
19:45 BST	Solanke 51'; Rothwell 54'	Report	Pearson (yellow card) 67'; Wilmot (yellow card) 79'	Stadium: Dean Court; Attendance: 10,282; Referee: Graham Scott

1 November 2023 Fourth round	Bournemouth	1–2	Liverpool	Bournemouth
19:45 GMT	Kerkez (yellow card) 53'; Scott (yellow card) 55'; Kluivert 64'	Report	Gakpo 31', (yellow card) 55'; Núñez 70'	Stadium: Dean Court; Attendance: 11,116; Referee: John Brooks

== Squad statistics ==
=== Appearances and goals ===
No.	Pos	Nat	Player	Total		Premier League		FA Cup		EFL Cup	
No.	Pos	Nat	Player	Apps	Goals	Apps	Goals	Apps	Goals	Apps	Goals
1	GK	(Brazil) BRA	Neto	32	0	32	0	0	0	0	0
3	DF	(Hungary) HUN	Milos Kerkez	33	0	22+6	0	1+1	0	2+1	0
4	MF	(England) ENG	Lewis Cook	38	0	32+1	0	3	0	1+1	0
5	DF	(England) ENG	Lloyd Kelly	25	1	17+6	0	1	1	1	0
6	DF	(Wales) WAL	Chris Mepham	13	0	6+4	0	1	0	2	0
8	MF	(France) FRA	Romain Faivre	6	0	0+5	0	0+1	0	0	0
9	FW	(England) ENG	Dominic Solanke	42	21	37+1	19	1	1	1+2	1
10	MF	(Scotland) SCO	Ryan Christie	43	1	35+2	0	1+2	0	1+2	1
11	MF	(Burkina Faso) BFA	Dango Ouattara	32	1	12+18	1	1	0	1	0
14	MF	(England) ENG	Alex Scott	27	2	11+12	1	3	1	1	0
15	DF	(England) ENG	Adam Smith	31	0	25+3	0	1	0	2	0
16	MF	(England) ENG	Marcus Tavernier	35	4	25+5	3	1+2	1	0+2	0
17	MF	(Colombia) COL	Luis Sinisterra	23	3	7+13	2	3	1	0	0
18	MF	(United States) USA	Tyler Adams	4	0	1+2	0	0	0	0+1	0
19	FW	(Netherlands) NED	Justin Kluivert	36	9	26+6	7	0+2	1	1+1	1
20	GK	(Romania) ROU	Ionuț Radu	5	0	2	0	0	0	3	0
23	DF	(England) ENG	James Hill	6	0	1+4	0	1	0	0	0
24	FW	(Ghana) GHA	Antoine Semenyo	36	8	25+8	8	0+1	0	2	0
25	DF	(Argentina) ARG	Marcos Senesi	36	4	26+5	4	3	0	2	0
26	FW	(Turkey) TUR	Enes Ünal	17	2	2+14	2	1	0	0	0
27	DF	(Ukraine) UKR	Illia Zabarnyi	42	1	37	1	2+1	0	2	0
29	MF	(Denmark) DEN	Philip Billing	33	2	13+16	2	2	0	2	0
37	DF	(England) ENG	Max Aarons	23	0	13+7	0	1	0	1+1	0
42	GK	(Republic of Ireland) IRL	Mark Travers	7	0	4	0	3	0	0	0
49	MF	(England) ENG	Dominic Sadi	2	0	0+1	0	0+1	0	0	0
Players who left the club during the season
7	MF	(Wales) WAL	David Brooks	18	3	2+11	1	2	1	2+1	1
8	MF	(England) ENG	Joe Rothwell	13	1	3+8	0	0	0	2	1
21	FW	(Wales) WAL	Kieffer Moore	12	2	0+8	1	1+1	1	1+1	0
22	MF	(Ivory Coast) CIV	Hamed Traorè	6	1	0+3	0	0	0	2+1	1
26	MF	(Republic of Ireland) IRL	Gavin Kilkenny	1	0	0	0	0+1	0	0	0
32	FW	(England) ENG	Jaidon Anthony	4	0	2+1	0	0	0	1	0
51	FW	(England) ENG	Daniel Adu-Adjei	1	0	0	0	0+1	0	0	0
