= Milos Kerkez =

Hungarian international footballer (born 2003)

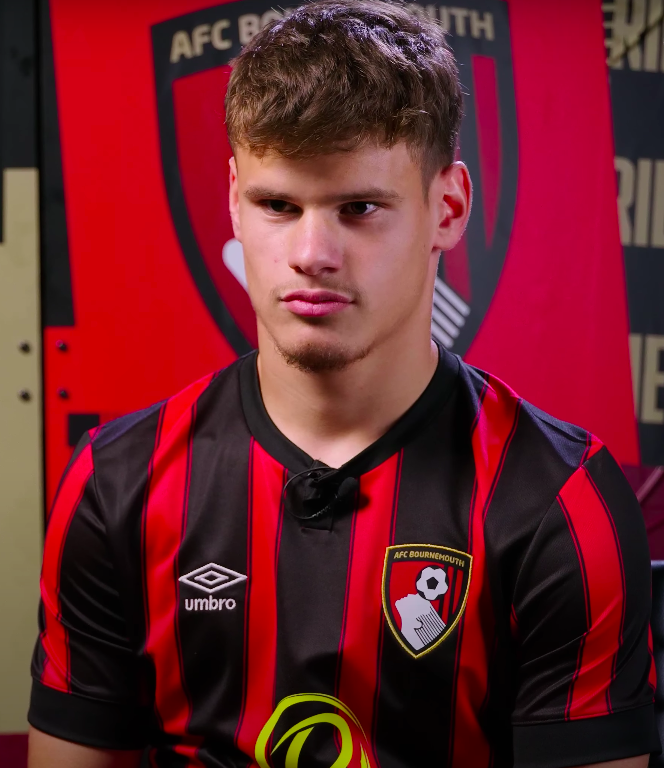
- Kerkez with Bournemouth in 2023

Personal information
- Full name: Milos Kerkez
- Date of birth: 7 November 2003 (age 23)
- Place of birth: Vrbas, Serbia and Montenegro
- Height: 1.80 m (5 ft 11 in)
- Position: Left-back

Team information
- Current team: Liverpool
- Number: 6

Youth career
- –2014: OFK Vrbas
- 2014–2019: Rapid Wien
- 2019: Hódmezővásárhely
- 2019–2020: Győr
- 2021–2022: AC Milan

Senior career*
Years	Team	Apps	(Gls)
2020–2021	Győr	16	(0)
2021–2022	AC Milan	0	(0)
2022–2023	AZ	33	(3)
2023–2025	Bournemouth	66	(2)
2025–	Liverpool	45	(2)

International career^{‡}
2020	Hungary U17	2	(0)
2021–2022	Hungary U21	8	(0)
2022–	Hungary	37	(1)
- * Club domestic league appearances and goals as of 22 November 2026 ‡ National team caps and goals as of 17 November 2026

Milos Kerkez (Serbian Cyrillic: Милош Керкез, romanized: Miloš Kerkez; born 7 November 2003) is a professional footballer who plays as a left-back for Premier League club Liverpool. Born in Serbia, he plays for the Hungary national team.

== Club career ==
=== Youth career ===
Kerkez joined Austrian side Rapid Wien in 2014, and played there until 2019.

=== Győr ===
In 2020, Kerkez was signed by Nemzeti Bajnokság II club Győr. In an interview with scoutedftbl.com, Kerkez said that, during his time at Győr, he decided to become a Hungarian international because he got a lot of help and support from his coaches and teammates. In an interview, published on M4 sport, his former coach, Sándor Csató, said ""Even then, it was clear that he was a very determined guy who gave his all during training and stayed behind after practice to keep working. He always had something in his hands, whether it was a ball or weights, and he even ran with a backpack full of weights. He often did things that you didn't see other players doing. You couldn't see it in the game yet, because he was a midfielder, and I put him in the left-back position in Győri ETO FC. From then on, he had some tougher games, but the older players accepted him and helped him, so he grew into adult football nicely." When Kerkez was later signed by Liverpool, Győr received more than £300,000 in sell-on clauses.

=== AC Milan ===
On 2 February 2021, Kerkez was signed by Serie A club AC Milan. Paolo Maldini phoned him a couple of days before the end of the transfer season to persuade him to join Milan. Kerkez said in an interview with Nemzeti Sport that "You cannot say no when Maldini calls you." As a result, he decided to leave Győr and join Milan. On 17 July 2021, Kerkez played his first match with the senior team in a training match against Pro Sesto. However, he felt like he was not given enough opportunity; therefore, he decided to leave Milan in 2022.

=== AZ ===
On 29 January 2022, Kerkez was signed by Eredivisie club AZ Alkmaar. On 19 May 2022, he played his first match for AZ against Heerenveen at the Abe Lenstra Stadion. The match ended with a 3–2 win for Heerenveen and Kerkez was substituted in the 77th minute. On 14 August 2022, Kerkez scored his first goal in the Eredivisie against Sparta Rotterdam at the Sparta Stadion Het Kasteel in the 2022–23 Eredivisie season. The match was won by AZ 3–2 and Kerkez scored the winning goal in the 65th minute. According to Nemzeti Sport, Benfica showed interest in purchasing him; however, the Portuguese club did not want to pay the €20 million for him asked by AZ.

=== Bournemouth ===
==== 2023–24 season ====
On 20 July 2023, Kerkez was signed by Premier League club Bournemouth for an undisclosed fee. He impressed the manager against friendlies with Southampton, Atalanta and Lorient; therefore, he was soon included in the starting line-up. On 12 August, Kerkez made his debut against West Ham United in a 1–1 home draw on the first matchday of the 2023–24 Premier League season. He was sent off against Wolverhampton Wanderers and, as a result, he had to miss three matches. Although the club appealed against his red card, the English Football Association rejected the appeal.

==== 2024–25 season ====
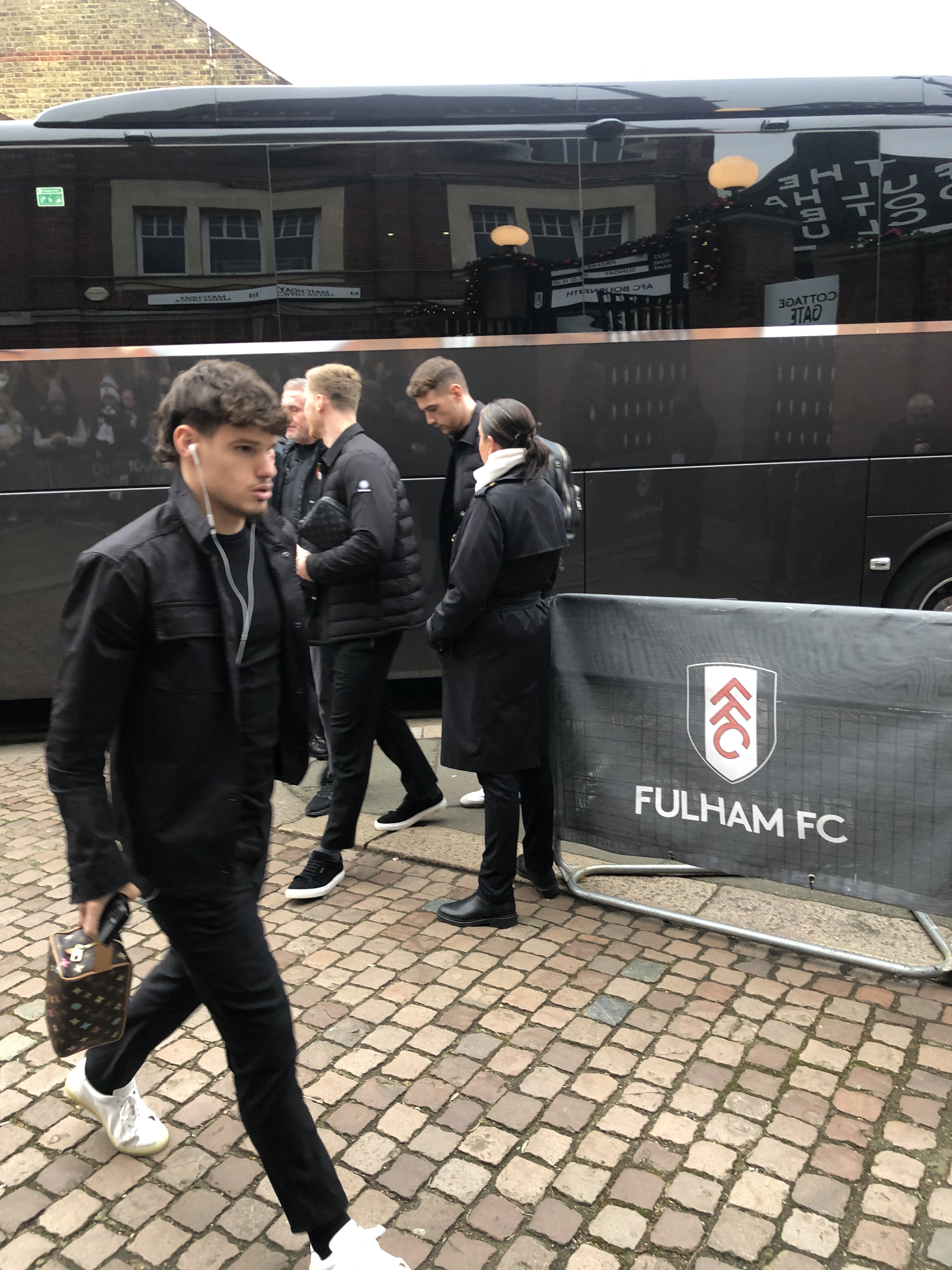
Kerkez with Bournemouth in 2024

Kerkez was voted player of the month for August at Bournemouth. On 2 November 2024, he provided two assists, one to Antoine Semenyo and another one to Evanilson, in a 2–1 victory over Manchester City. On 30 November 2024, Kerkez scored his first goal for Bournemouth in a 4–2 win against Wolverhampton Wanderers. In November, his goal was voted goal of the month for Bournemouth. On 4 January 2025, he provided an assist to David Brooks in a 1–0 victory over Everton in the 2024–25 Premier League season. On 18 January 2025, he scored the fourth goal in a 4–1 victory over Newcastle United at St James' Park in the 96th minute. Kerkez was voted the player of the month in March for Bournemouth.

On 19 June 2025, it was announced that Kerkez was one of six nominees for the PFA Young Player of the Year award.

=== Liverpool ===
On 26 June 2025, Kerkez joined Liverpool on a five-year deal, for a fee believed to be £40m. He played his first official match in a defeat on penalties to Crystal Palace in the 2025 FA Community Shield match at Wembley Stadium. His debut at Anfield ended with a 4–2 victory over his previous club, Bournemouth, on 15 August 2025. Kerkez started the match then was substituted for Andy Robertson in the 60th minute. On 25 October, he scored his first goal for Liverpool in a 3–2 away defeat against Brentford in the Premier League. On 8 January 2026, he was voted the Player of the Match against Arsenal. On 21 March 2026, he scored his second goal for the club an equalizer in a 2–1 defeat against Brighton & Hove Albion at the Falmer Stadium.

== International career ==
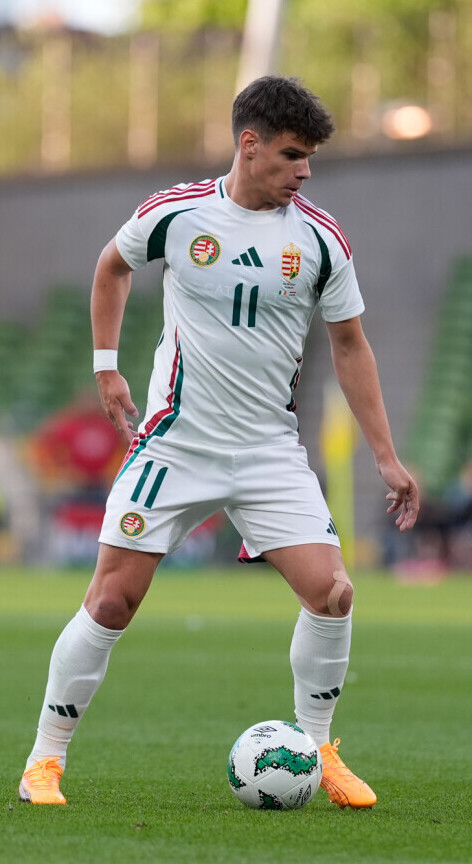
Kerkez playing for Hungary in 2024

Kerkez was eligible to play for both the Hungary and Serbia national teams. He represented Hungary at both under-17 and under-21 level, before being called up to the Hungary senior team in June 2022, when he was named on the substitutes bench for a 2022–23 UEFA Nations League match against England. On 23 September 2022, Kerkez made his first appearance for Hungary, playing the full match at left wing-back as the team beat Germany 1–0 in Leipzig.

On 16 November 2023, Kerkez received a red card in the UEFA Euro 2024 qualifying match against Bulgaria. However, his expulsion did not affect negatively the outcome of the match since Hungary qualified for the UEFA Euro 2024. In an interview, Hungarian captain Dominik Szoboszlai said that Kerkez "was told in three distinct languages not to do anything stupid" during the match against Bulgaria.

On 14 May 2024, Kerkez was named in Hungary's squad for UEFA Euro 2024. In Hungary's opening match of the tournament against Switzerland, he played 79 minutes before being substituted for Martin Ádám as the team were beaten 3–1 in Cologne. In doing so, he became the youngest player to make an appearance for Hungary at a UEFA European Championship since Zoltán Varga and Ferenc Bene played in the 1964 third-place play-off. He went on to start against both Germany and Scotland as Hungary finished third in Group A.

On 2 October 2026, he scored his first international goal in a 1–0 victory over Georgia in the 2026–27 UEFA Nations League B match at Puskás Aréna. His Liverpool teammate Dominik Szoboszlai said after the winning goal that "A header by Kerkez would have been the last thing I expected, but I was really happy about it!".

== Style of play and Reception ==
Kerkez has received positive attention from analysts and media outlets for his athleticism, attacking contribution and work rate as a modern full-back. Writing for ESPN, analysts described him as a highly driven player with strong mentality and physical qualities, highlighting his "courage, explosiveness, agility and strong will to win". Analysts have also emphasized Kerkez's physical output and attacking movement. His energy and ability to deliver crosses from both the byline and deeper areas have been cited as key reasons for interest from major European clubs. Kerkez's performances have also been recognised in media rankings of players in his position; in December 2025, football magazine FourFourTwo called him the seventh best left-back in world football.

== Personal life ==
Kerkez said in an interview, published by Nemzeti Sport, that both his Serbian father and his Hungarian grandmother wanted him to represent Hungary. His brother Marko Kerkez is also a professional footballer.

Kerkez was born in Vrbas, Serbia. He speaks Serbian, Hungarian, English and German.

== Career statistics ==
=== Club ===
As of match played 22 November 2026

Appearances and goals by club, season and competition
Club	Season	League			National cup (Note: Includes Magyar Kupa, KNVB Cup, FA Cup)		League cup (Note: Includes EFL Cup)		Europe		Other		Total	
Club	Season	Division	Apps	Goals	Apps	Goals	Apps	Goals	Apps	Goals	Apps	Goals	Apps	Goals
Győr	2020–21	NB II	16	0	2	0	—		—		—		18	0
AC Milan	2021–22	Serie A	0	0	0	0	—		0	0	—		0	0
Jong AZ	2021–22	Eerste Divisie	9	0	—		—		—		—		9	0
AZ	2021–22	Eredivisie	0	0	1	0	—		0	0	4 (Note: Appearances in Eredivisie European play-offs)	0	5	0
AZ	2022–23	Eredivisie	33	3	2	0	—		17 (Note: Appearances in UEFA Europa Conference League)	2	—		52	5
AZ	Total		33	3	3	0	—		17	2	4	0	57	5
Bournemouth	2023–24	Premier League	28	0	2	0	3	0	—		—		33	0
Bournemouth	2024–25	Premier League	38	2	3	0	0	0	—		—		41	2
Bournemouth	Total		66	2	5	0	3	0	—		—		74	2
Liverpool	2025–26	Premier League	34	2	2	0	2	0	9 (Note: Appearances in UEFA Champions League)	0	1 (Note: Appearance in FA Community Shield)	0	48	2
Liverpool	2026–27	Premier League	11	0	0	0	1	0	2 (Note: Appearances in UEFA Champions League)	0	—		14	0
Liverpool	Total		45	2	2	0	3	0	11	0	1	0	62	2
Career total			169	7	12	0	6	0	28	2	5	0	220	9

=== International ===
As of match played 17 November 2026

Appearances and goals by national team and year
National team	Year	Apps	Goals
Hungary	2022	4	0
Hungary	2023	9	0
Hungary	2024	8	0
Hungary	2025	8	0
Hungary	2026	8	1
Total		37	1

Scores and results list Hungary's goal tally first, score column indicates score after each Kerkez goal.

List of international goals scored by Milos Kerkez
No.	Date	Venue	Cap	Opponent	Score	Result	Competition
1	2 October 2026	Puskás Aréna, Budapest, Hungary	35	Georgia	1–0	1–0	2026–27 UEFA Nations League B

== Honours ==
Individual

- PFA Team of the Year: 2024–25 Premier League
- Premier League Fan Team of the Season: 2024–25
