= James Hill (footballer, born 2002) =

English footballer (born 2002)

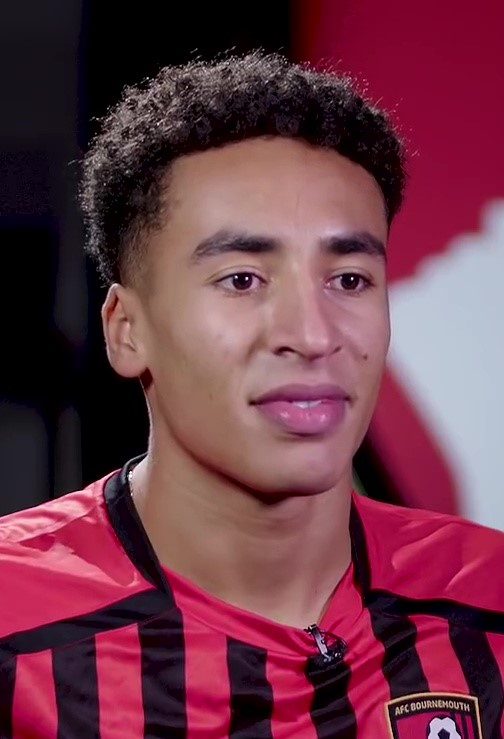
- Hill with Bournemouth in 2022

Personal information
- Full name: James Clayton Hill
- Date of birth: 10 January 2002 (age 24)
- Place of birth: Bristol, England
- Height: 1.84 m (6 ft 0 in)
- Position: Centre-back

Team information
- Current team: Bournemouth
- Number: 5

Youth career
- –2018: Fleetwood Town

Senior career*
Years	Team	Apps	(Gls)
2018–2022	Fleetwood Town	43	(1)
2022–	Bournemouth	56	(0)
2023	→ Heart of Midlothian (loan)	14	(0)
2023–2024	→ Blackburn Rovers (loan)	18	(1)

International career^{‡}
2021–2022	England U20	4	(1)
2022	England U21	1	(0)
- * Club domestic league appearances and goals as of 08:35, 22 November 2026 (UTC) ‡ National team caps and goals as of 13:59, 12 June 2022 (UTC)

James Clayton Hill (born 10 January 2002) is an English professional footballer who plays as a centre-back for Premier League club Bournemouth.

== Early and personal life ==
His father Matt Hill was also a footballer, as is his younger brother, Tyler Hill. Hill married and had his first child in summer 2026.

== Club career ==
=== Fleetwood Town ===
Hill made his senior debut for Fleetwood Town in the EFL Cup, against Leicester City on 28 August 2018. Aged just 16 on his debut, Hill became the club's youngest ever first-team player. He turned professional in February 2019. He made his "impressive" league debut on 19 April 2019, against Peterborough United, with his long throw leading to Hunter's 95th minute equaliser for Fleetwood Town. Just three days later, on 22 April 2019, Hill made his first league start against his father's former club, Blackpool, which concluded in a 2–1 defeat for the side.

At the end of the 2020–21 season, Hill was offered a new contract at Fleetwood Town.

=== AFC Bournemouth ===
On 5 January 2022, Hill joined Championship club AFC Bournemouth for an undisclosed fee said to be a club record for Fleetwood and reported to be £1 million, signing a four-and-a-half-year contract.

He moved on loan to Heart of Midlothian in January 2023, and on loan to Blackburn Rovers in September 2023. He scored his first goal for Blackburn on 29 November 2023 in a 4–2 win against Birmingham City. He was recalled in January 2024.

== International career ==
On 6 September 2021, Hill made his debut for the England U20s during a 6–1 victory over Romania U20s at St. George's Park.

On 10 June 2022, Hill made his England U21 debut during a 2023 UEFA European Under-21 Championship qualification 5–0 victory away to Kosovo.

Hill received his first senior call-up on 10 November 2026 for the UEFA Nations League games against Croatia and Spain, providing cover for Ezri Konsa.

== Career statistics ==
As of match played 21 November 2026

Appearances and goals by club, season and competition
Club	Season	League			National cup (Note: Includes FA Cup, Scottish Cup)		League cup (Note: Includes EFL Cup)		Other		Total	
Club	Season	Division	Apps	Goals	Apps	Goals	Apps	Goals	Apps	Goals	Apps	Goals
Fleetwood Town	2018–19	League One	2	0	0	0	1	0	0	0	3	0
Fleetwood Town	2019–20	League One	0	0	0	0	0	0	0	0	0	0
Fleetwood Town	2020–21	League One	28	0	0	0	3	0	4 (Note: Appearances in EFL Trophy)	0	35	0
Fleetwood Town	2021–22	League One	13	1	0	0	1	0	1	0	15	1
Fleetwood Town	Total		43	1	0	0	5	0	5	0	53	1
Bournemouth	2021–22	Championship	1	0	1	0	0	0	—		2	0
Bournemouth	2022–23	Premier League	0	0	0	0	2	0	—		2	0
Bournemouth	2023–24	Premier League	5	0	1	0	0	0	—		6	0
Bournemouth	2024–25	Premier League	10	0	3	0	1	0	—		14	0
Bournemouth	2025–26	Premier League	29	0	1	0	1	0	—		31	0
Bournemouth	2026–27	Premier League	11	0	0	0	1	0	4 (Note: Appearances in UEFA Europa League)	0	16	0
Bournemouth	Total		56	0	6	0	5	0	4	0	71	0
Heart of Midlothian (loan)	2022–23	Scottish Premiership	14	0	3	0	0	0	0	0	17	0
Blackburn Rovers (loan)	2023–24	Championship	18	1	0	0	2	0	—		20	1
Career total			130	2	9	0	12	0	9	0	160	2
