= 2024–25 AFC Bournemouth season =

123rd season in existence of AFC Bournemouth

Bournemouth
2024–25 season
- Owner: Black Knight Football Club
- Chairman: Bill Foley
- Head coach: Andoni Iraola
- Stadium: Dean Court
- Premier League: 9th
- FA Cup: Quarter-finals
- EFL Cup: Second round
- Top goalscorer: League: Justin Kluivert (12); All: Justin Kluivert; Antoine Semenyo (13 each)
- Highest home attendance: 11,248 v Aston Villa, Premier League, 10 May 2025
- Lowest home attendance: 10,916 v West Bromwich Albion, FA Cup, 11 January 2025
- Average home league attendance: 11,214
- Biggest win: 5–0 v Nottingham Forest, Premier League, 25 January 2025
- Biggest defeat: 0–3 v Liverpool, Premier League, 21 September 2024
| Home colours | Away colours | Third colours |

The 2024–25 season was the 123rd season in the history of AFC Bournemouth and the club's third consecutive season in the Premier League, making it their eighth season in the top flight overall. In addition to the domestic league, the club also participated in the FA Cup and the EFL Cup.

== Transfers ==
=== In ===
| Date | Pos. | Player | From | Fee | Ref. |
|---|---|---|---|---|---|
| 14 June 2024 (Note: The transfer was announced on 29 May, and would become official on 14 June once the transfer window re-opened.) | CF | (Turkey) Enes Ünal | (Spain) Getafe | £13,000,000 | |
| 14 June 2024 (Note: The transfer was announced on 4 June, and would become official on 14 June once the transfer window re-opened.) | GK | (New Zealand) Alex Paulsen | (New Zealand) Wellington Phoenix | £850,000 | |
| 10 July 2024 | CF | (Canada) Daniel Jebbison | (England) Sheffield United | £1,500,000 | |
| 11 July 2024 | CF | (England) Koby Mottoh (Note: Signed initially for the Under-21s) | (England) Portsmouth | Free | |
| 30 July 2024 | CB | (Spain) Dean Huijsen | (Italy) Juventus | £12,800,000 | |
| 13 August 2024 | RB | (Mexico) Julián Araujo | (Spain) Barcelona | £8,500,000 | |
| 16 August 2024 | CF | (Brazil) Evanilson | (Portugal) Porto | £40,200,000 | |
| 3 January 2025 | CB | (United States) Matai Akinmboni | (United States) D.C. United | £1,000,000 | |
| 6 January 2025 | GK | (England) Kai Crampton | (England) Chelsea | Undisclosed | |
| 7 January 2025 | LB | (Argentina) Julio Soler | (Argentina) Lanús | £6,600,000 | |
| 17 January 2025 | LW | (England) Zain Silcott-Duberry | (England) Chelsea | Undisclosed | |
| 3 February 2025 | CF | (France) Eli Junior Kroupi | (France) Lorient | £10,000,000 | |

=== Out ===
| Date | Pos. | Player | To | Fee | Ref. |
|---|---|---|---|---|---|
| 28 June 2024 | CM | (England) Jack Wadham | (England) Sutton United | Undisclosed | |
| 15 July 2024 | CF | (Wales) Kieffer Moore | (England) Sheffield United | £2,000,000 | |
| 10 August 2024 | CF | (England) Dominic Solanke | (England) Tottenham Hotspur | £65,000,000 | |
| 29 August 2024 | CM | (Republic of Ireland) Gavin Kilkenny | (England) Swindon Town | Undisclosed | |

=== Loaned in ===
| Date | Pos. | Player | From | Date until | Ref. |
|---|---|---|---|---|---|
| 29 August 2024 | GK | (Spain) Kepa Arrizabalaga | (England) Chelsea | End of Season | |

=== Loaned out ===
| Date | Pos. | Player | To | Date until | Ref. |
|---|---|---|---|---|---|
| 10 July 2024 | LW | (Spain) Michael Dacosta | (England) Crawley Town | 3 September 2024 (Note: Loan was terminated early due to injury) | |
| 10 July 2024 | CM | (England) Charlie Osborne | (Austria) Hartberg | End of Season | |
| 11 July 2024 | CM | (England) Joe Rothwell | (England) Leeds United | End of Season | |
| 26 July 2024 | RB | (England) Finn Tonks | (England) Torquay United | 1 January 2025 | |
| 1 August 2024 | CF | (England) Daniel Adu-Adjei | (England) Carlisle United | 10 January 2025 (Note: On 10 January, Adu-Adjei was recalled from his season-long loan at Carlisle) | |
| 3 August 2024 | GK | (England) Billy Terrell | (England) Weymouth | 17 January 2025 | |
| 16 August 2024 | RM | (France) Romain Faivre | (France) Brest | End of Season | |
| 21 August 2024 | LW | (England) Dominic Sadi | (England) Carlisle United | 10 January 2025 (Note: On 10 January, Sadi was recalled from his season-long loan at Carlisle) | |
| 23 August 2024 | LB | (France) Noa Boutin | (England) Eastleigh | End of Season | |
| 26 August 2024 | AM | (Ivory Coast) Hamed Traorè | (France) Auxerre | End of Season | |
| 29 August 2024 | LW | (England) Jaidon Anthony | (England) Burnley | End of Season | |
| 30 August 2024 | CF | (Canada) Daniel Jebbison | (England) Watford | 8 January 2025 (Note: On 8 January, Jebbison was recalled from his season-long loan at Watford) | |
| 30 August 2024 | GK | (New Zealand) Alex Paulsen | (New Zealand) Auckland FC | End of Season | |
| 30 August 2024 | GK | (Brazil) Neto | (England) Arsenal | End of Season | |
| 30 August 2024 | CB | (Wales) Chris Mepham | (England) Sunderland | End of Season | |
| 5 December 2024 | CF | (England) Jonny Stuttle | (England) Aldershot Town | 28 January 2025 (Note: On 28 January, Stuttle was recalled back from his loan at Aldershot) | |
| 26 December 2024 | CF | (England) Ash Clarke | (England) AFC Totton | 23 January 2025 | |
| 4 January 2025 | RB | (England) Finn Tonks | (England) Farnborough | 6 February 2025 (Note: On 6 February, Tonks was recalled from his loan at Farnborough) | |
| 10 January 2025 | DM | (England) Lewis Brown | (England) Salisbury | End of Season | |
| 11 January 2025 | CM | (Denmark) Philip Billing | (Italy) Napoli | End of Season | |
| 13 January 2025 | RB | (England) Max Aarons | (Spain) Valencia | End of Season | |
| 29 January 2025 | GK | (Republic of Ireland) Mark Travers | (England) Middlesbrough | End of Season | |
| 30 January 2025 | CF | (England) Jonny Stuttle | (England) Farnborough | End of Season | |
| 31 January 2025 | CM | (England) Karlos Gregory | (England) Salisbury | End of Season | |
| 3 February 2025 | CF | (France) Eli Junior Kroupi | (France) Lorient | End of Season | |
| 6 February 2025 | RB | (England) Finn Tonks | (England) Salisbury | End of Season | |
| 29 March 2025 | GK | (England) Mack Allan | (England) Bashley | 26 April 2025 | |
| 29 March 2025 | CM | (Nigeria) Malachi Ogunleye | (England) Basingstoke Town | 26 April 2025 | |
| 29 March 2025 | LB | (England) Sonny Parkes | (England) Christchurch | 26 April 2025 | |
| 29 March 2025 | AM | (Wales) Josh Salmon | (England) Horndean | 26 April 2025 | |
| 29 March 2025 | RB | (England) Tommy Whitehead | (England) Christchurch | 26 April 2025 | |

=== Released / Out of Contract ===
| Date | Pos. | Player | Subsequent club | Join date | Ref. |
|---|---|---|---|---|---|
| 30 June 2024 | CB | (England) Lloyd Kelly | (England) Newcastle United | 1 July 2024 | |
| 30 June 2024 | CF | (Jamaica) Jamal Lowe | (England) Sheffield Wednesday | 1 July 2024 | |
| 30 June 2024 | CB | (England) Harry Redknapp | (England) Dorchester Town | 1 July 2024 | |
| 30 June 2024 | LB | (Republic of Ireland) Ben Greenwood | (England) Weymouth | 16 July 2024 | |
| 30 June 2024 | CF | (England) Euan Pollock | (England) Weymouth | 16 July 2024 | |
| 30 June 2024 | GK | (England) Cameron Plain | (England) Poole Town | 31 July 2024 | |
| 30 June 2024 | LW | (England) Baylin Johnson | (Wales) Cardiff City | 7 August 2024 | |
| 30 June 2024 | GK | (England) Noah Crisp | (England) Dorchester Town | 14 August 2024 | |
| 30 June 2024 | AM | (Denmark) Emiliano Marcondes | (England) Norwich City | 4 October 2024 | |
| 30 June 2024 | CB | (England) Ollie Eagle | Currently unattached | | |
| 30 June 2024 | RB | (England) Ryan Fredericks | Currently unattached | | |
| 30 June 2024 | CB | (England) Jack Holman | Currently unattached | | |
| 30 June 2024 | AM | (England) Ferdinand Okoh | Currently unattached | | |
| 30 June 2024 | GK | (Republic of Ireland) Darren Randolph | Currently unattached | | |

== Pre-season and friendlies ==
On 25 April, Bournemouth announced a pre-season tour to Los Angeles, with a friendly against Wrexham. Two home friendlies against Spanish opposition was later confirmed, Rayo Vallecano and Girona. On 1 July, a second fixture for the United States tour was announced, against Arsenal.

Win Draw Loss Fixtures

| 20 July 2024 Friendly | Wrexham | 1–1 | Bournemouth | Santa Barbara, United States |
| 16:00 PDT (00:00 BST) | Dobson (yellow card) 7'; Hill 45+3' (o.g.) | Report | Senesi 53' | Stadium: Harder Stadium; Attendance: 13,322 |

| 24 July 2024 Friendly | Arsenal | 1–1 (5–4 p) | Bournemouth | Carson, United States |
| 19:30 PDT (03:30 BST) | Vieira 18'; Timber (yellow card) 53' | Report | Zabarnyi (yellow card) 33'; Cook (yellow card) 69'; Semenyo 73' | Stadium: Dignity Health Sports Park; Attendance: 13,000; Referee: Brandon Stevis (United States) |
| | Penalties |
| | Ødegaard (penalty scored); Zinchenko (penalty scored); Jorginho (penalty scored); Trossard (penalty missed); Gabriel Jesus (penalty scored); Kiwior (penalty scored) | | (penalty scored) Semenyo; (penalty missed) Billing; (penalty scored) Ouattara; (penalty scored) Smith; (penalty scored) Jebbison; (penalty missed) Christie |

| 4 August 2024 Friendly | Bournemouth (England) | 1–0 | (Spain) Rayo Vallecano | Bournemouth |
| 15:00 BST | Sinisterra 32' | Report | Valentín (yellow card) 40' | Stadium: Dean Court; Referee: Tim Robinson (England) |

| 10 August 2024 Friendly | Bournemouth (England) | 3–2 | (Spain) Girona | Bournemouth |
| 17:15 BST | Kluivert 6' (pen.); Scott (yellow card) 57'; Sinisterra 72'; Jebbison 80' | Report | Stuani 35', (yellow card) 82'; Roca 50', (yellow card) 66' | Stadium: Dean Court; Referee: Yusuke Araki (Japan) |
Note: Fixture was initially scheduled for a 19:00 kick-off, but was moved to help facilitate Girona's immediate return to Spain.

== Competitions ==
=== Overall record ===
| Competition | First match | Last match | Starting round | Final position | Record | | | | | | | |
| Competition | First match | Last match | Starting round | Final position | Pld | W | D | L | GF | GA | GD | Win % |
|---|---|---|---|---|---|---|---|---|---|---|---|---|
| Premier League | 17 August 2024 | 25 May 2025 | Matchday 1 | 9th | 38 | 15 | 11 | 12 | 58 | 46 | +12 | 39.47 |
| FA Cup | 11 January 2025 | 30 March 2025 | Third round | Quarter-finals | 4 | 2 | 1 | 1 | 9 | 4 | +5 | 50.00 |
| EFL Cup | 28 August 2024 | | Second round | Second round | 1 | 0 | 0 | 1 | 0 | 1 | −1 | 0.00 |
| Total | | | | | 43 | 17 | 12 | 14 | 67 | 51 | +16 | 39.53 |

Source: Soccerway

=== Premier League ===
==== League table ====
| Pos | Team | Pld | W | D | L | GF | GA | GD | Pts | Qualification or relegation |
|---|---|---|---|---|---|---|---|---|---|---|
| 7 | Nottingham Forest | 38 | 19 | 8 | 11 | 58 | 46 | +12 | 65 | Qualification for the Europa League league phase (Note: Initially, Crystal Palace qualified for the Europa League league phase as the 2024–25 FA Cup winners. However, due to multi-club ownership rules, they were not permitted to enter the Europa League and entered the Conference League play-off round instead, with 7th-placed Nottingham Forest taking their place in the Europa League. Crystal Palace appealed the decision but this was ultimately rejected.) |
| 8 | Brighton & Hove Albion | 38 | 16 | 13 | 9 | 66 | 59 | +7 | 61 | |
| 9 | Bournemouth | 38 | 15 | 11 | 12 | 58 | 46 | +12 | 56 | |
| 10 | Brentford | 38 | 16 | 8 | 14 | 66 | 57 | +9 | 56 | |
| 11 | Fulham | 38 | 15 | 9 | 14 | 54 | 54 | 0 | 54 | |

Source: Premier League
Rules for classification: 1) Points; 2) Goal difference; 3) Goals scored; 4) If the champions, relegated teams or qualified teams for UEFA competitions cannot be determined by rules 1 to 3, rules 4.1 to 4.3 are applied – 4.1) Points gained in head-to-head record between such teams; 4.2) Away goals scored in head-to-head record between such teams; 4.3) Play-offs

==== Results summary ====
| Overall | | | | | | | | Home | | | | | | Away | | | | | |
| Pld | W | D | L | GF | GA | GD | Pts | W | D | L | GF | GA | GD | W | D | L | GF | GA | GD |
|---|---|---|---|---|---|---|---|---|---|---|---|---|---|---|---|---|---|---|---|
| 38 | 15 | 11 | 12 | 58 | 46 | +12 | 56 | 8 | 4 | 7 | 23 | 16 | +7 | 7 | 7 | 5 | 35 | 30 | +5 |

Source: Soccerway

==== Results by round ====
| Round | 1 | 2 | 3 | 4 | 5 | 6 | 7 | 8 | 9 | 10 | 11 | 12 | 13 | 14 | 15 | 16 | 17 | 18 | 19 | 20 | 21 | 22 | 23 | 24 | 25 | 26 | 27 | 28 | 29 | 30 | 31 | 32 | 33 | 34 | 35 | 36 | 37 | 38 |
|---|---|---|---|---|---|---|---|---|---|---|---|---|---|---|---|---|---|---|---|---|---|---|---|---|---|---|---|---|---|---|---|---|---|---|---|---|---|---|
| Ground | A | H | A | H | A | H | A | H | A | H | A | H | A | H | A | H | A | H | A | H | A | A | H | H | A | H | A | A | H | H | A | H | A | H | A | H | A | H |
| Result | D | D | W | L | L | W | L | W | D | W | L | L | W | W | W | D | W | D | D | W | D | W | W | L | W | L | L | D | L | L | D | W | D | D | W | L | L | W |
| Position | 9 | 14 | 8 | 11 | 13 | 11 | 13 | 11 | 11 | 10 | 12 | 13 | 13 | 9 | 8 | 6 | 5 | 6 | 7 | 7 | 8 | 7 | 7 | 7 | 5 | 6 | 7 | 9 | 10 | 10 | 10 | 8 | 8 | 10 | 8 | 10 | 11 | 9 |
| Points | 1 | 2 | 5 | 5 | 5 | 8 | 8 | 11 | 12 | 15 | 15 | 15 | 18 | 21 | 24 | 25 | 28 | 29 | 30 | 33 | 34 | 37 | 40 | 40 | 43 | 43 | 43 | 44 | 44 | 44 | 45 | 48 | 49 | 50 | 53 | 53 | 53 | 56 |

Source: Premier League
A = Away; H = Home; W = Win; D = Draw; L = Loss

==== Matches ====
On 18 June 2024, the Premier League fixtures were released.

Win Draw Loss Fixtures

| 17 August 2024 1 | Nottingham Forest | 1–1 | Bournemouth | West Bridgford |
| 15:00 BST | Wood 23'; Williams (yellow card) 49' | Report | Cook (yellow card) 45+12'; Kerkez (yellow card) 48'; Semenyo 86'; Kluivert (yellow card) 89' | Stadium: City Ground; Attendance: 29,763; Referee: Michael Oliver |

| 25 August 2024 2 | Bournemouth | 1–1 | Newcastle United | Bournemouth |
| 14:00 BST | Christie (yellow card) 13'; Tavernier 37'; Senesi (yellow card) 88' | Report | Gordon 77'; Burn (yellow card) 89'; Joelinton (yellow card) 90+6' | Stadium: Dean Court; Attendance: 11,161; Referee: David Coote |
Note: Fixture was initially scheduled for 24 August, but was moved for live Sky Sports broadcast.

| 31 August 2024 3 | Everton | 2–3 | Bournemouth | Liverpool |
| 15:00 BST | Keane 50', (yellow card) 76'; Calvert-Lewin 57'; Iroegbunam (yellow card) 90+2' | Report | Semenyo (yellow card) 76', (goal) 87'; Cook 90+2'; Sinisterra 90+6' | Stadium: Goodison Park; Attendance: 38,805; Referee: Stuart Attwell |

| 14 September 2024 4 | Bournemouth | 0–1 | Chelsea | Bournemouth |
| 20:00 BST | Christie (yellow card) 18'; Cook (yellow card) 35'; Smith (yellow card) 38'; Evanilson (penalty missed) 38'; Kluivert (yellow card) 59'; Senesi (yellow card) 80'; Semenyo (yellow card) 90+6' | Report | Fofana (yellow card) 31'; Cucurella (yellow card) 36'; Sánchez (yellow card) 37'; Jackson (yellow card) 52'; Colwill (yellow card) 57'; Sancho (yellow card) 57'; Nkunku 86'; Veiga (yellow card) 87'; Félix (yellow card) 90+1' | Stadium: Dean Court; Attendance: 11,235; Referee: Anthony Taylor |
Note: Fixture was initially scheduled for a 15:00 kick-off, but was moved for live Sky Sports broadcast.

| 21 September 2024 5 | Liverpool | 3–0 | Bournemouth | Liverpool |
| 15:00 BST | Díaz 26', 28'; Núñez 37'; Konaté (yellow card) 60' | Report | Christie (yellow card) 1'; Kluivert (yellow card) 18'; Huijsen (yellow card) 45+3'; Cook (yellow card) 87' | Stadium: Anfield; Attendance: 60,347; Referee: Tony Harrington |

| 30 September 2024 6 | Bournemouth | 3–1 | Southampton | Bournemouth |
| 20:00 BST | Evanilson 17'; Ouattara 32'; Semenyo 39'; Tavernier (yellow card) 45+1'; Kerkez (yellow card) 50' | Report | Fernandes (yellow card) 27'; Harwood-Bellis 51'; Sugawara (yellow card) 52'; Dibling (yellow card) 55'; Downes (yellow card) 55'; Lallana (yellow card) 90+3' | Stadium: Dean Court; Attendance: 11,243; Referee: Michael Oliver |
Note: Fixture was initially scheduled for 28 September, but was moved for live Sky Sports broadcast.

| 5 October 2024 7 | Leicester City | 1–0 | Bournemouth | Leicester |
| 15:00 BST | Buonanotte 16'; Ayew (yellow card) 40'; Ndidi (yellow card) 50'; Justin (yellow card) 64'; Soumaré (yellow card) 90+2' | Report | Senesi (yellow card) 84' | Stadium: King Power Stadium; Attendance: 31,706; Referee: Darren Bond |

| 19 October 2024 8 | Bournemouth | 2–0 | Arsenal | Bournemouth |
| 17:30 BST | Semenyo (yellow card) 63'; Christie 70'; Kluivert 79' (pen.) | Report | Saliba (red card) 30'; White (yellow card) 68' | Stadium: Dean Court; Attendance: 11,235; Referee: Robert Jones |
Note: Fixture was initially scheduled for 19 October, then moved to 20 October, but was reverted back to 19 October, due to Arsenal's involvement in the UEFA Champions League, for live Sky Sports broadcast.

| 26 October 2024 9 | Aston Villa | 1–1 | Bournemouth | Birmingham |
| 15:00 BST | Onana (yellow card) 4'; Tielemans (yellow card) 18'; Ramsey (yellow card) 41'; McGinn (yellow card) 55'; Digne (yellow card) 58'; Barkley 76', (yellow card) 90+6'; Cash (yellow card) 90+4' | Report | Kluivert (yellow card) 10'; Araujo (yellow card) 21'; Smith (yellow card) 39'; Ünal (yellow card) 45+1'; Semenyo (yellow card) 80'; Tavernier (yellow card) 90'; Evanilson 90+6' | Stadium: Villa Park; Attendance: 42,165; Referee: Chris Kavanagh |

| 2 November 2024 10 | Bournemouth | 2–1 | Manchester City | Bournemouth |
| 15:00 GMT | Christie (yellow card) 6'; Semenyo 9'; Evanilson 64'; Adams (yellow card) 90+1' | Report | Walker (yellow card) 71'; Gvardiol 82' | Stadium: Dean Court; Attendance: 11,231; Referee: Michael Oliver |

| 9 November 2024 11 | Brentford | 3–2 | Bournemouth | Brentford |
| 15:00 GMT | Wissa 27', 58'; Damsgaard 50'; Schade (yellow card) 88'; Carvalho (yellow card) 90+7' | Report | Evanilson 17'; Senesi (yellow card) 34'; Kluivert 49'; Christie (yellow card) 68'; Smith (yellow card) 81'; Zabarnyi (yellow card) 89' | Stadium: Gtech Community Stadium; Attendance: 16,993; Referee: Darren Bond |

| 23 November 2024 12 | Bournemouth | 1–2 | Brighton & Hove Albion | Bournemouth |
| 15:00 GMT | Semenyo (yellow card) 40'; Brooks 90+3'; Cook (yellow card) 90+6' | Report | João Pedro 4'; Rutter (yellow card) 30'; Baleba (yellow card) 45+1' (yellow-red card) 59'; Mitoma 49'; Van Hecke (yellow card) 90+6' | Stadium: Dean Court; Attendance: 11,196; Referee: Stuart Attwell |

| 30 November 2024 13 | Wolverhampton Wanderers | 2–4 | Bournemouth | Wolverhampton |
| 15:00 GMT | Semedo (yellow card) 2'; Larsen 5', 69', (yellow card) 90+4'; Dawson (yellow card) 53'; Sá (yellow card) 73'; Lemina (yellow card) 76' | Report | Kluivert 3' (pen.), 18' (pen.), 74' (pen.); Kerkez 8'; Zabarnyi (yellow card) 45' | Stadium: Molineux Stadium; Attendance: 30,678; Referee: Peter Bankes |

| 5 December 2024 14 | Bournemouth | 1–0 | Tottenham Hotspur | Bournemouth |
| 20:15 GMT | Huijsen 17'; Arrizabalaga (yellow card) 62'; Adams (yellow card) 68' | Report | Davies (yellow card) 4'; Bissouma (yellow card) 21' | Stadium: Dean Court; Attendance: 11,234; Referee: Simon Hooper |
Note: Fixture was initially scheduled for 3 December, but was moved for live Amazon Prime Video broadcast.

| 8 December 2024 15 | Ipswich Town | 1–2 | Bournemouth | Ipswich |
| 14:00 GMT | Delap (yellow card) 12'; Szmodics (yellow card) 16'; Chaplin 21' | Report | Ünal 87'; Brooks (yellow card) 90'; Ouattara 90+5' | Stadium: Portman Road; Attendance: 29,180; Referee: Michael Salisbury |

| 16 December 2024 16 | Bournemouth | 1–1 | West Ham United | Bournemouth |
| 20:00 GMT | Ünal 90' | Report | Soler (yellow card) 23'; Álvarez (yellow card) 62'; Paquetá 87' (pen.) | Stadium: Dean Court; Attendance: 11,204; Referee: Chris Kavanagh |
Note: Fixture was broadcast live on Sky Sports.

| 22 December 2024 17 | Manchester United | 0–3 | Bournemouth | Trafford |
| 14:00 GMT | Ugarte (yellow card) 37' | Report | Huijsen 29', (yellow card) 90+1'; Smith (yellow card) 35'; Kluivert 61' (pen.); Semenyo 63'; Arrizabalaga (yellow card) 82' | Stadium: Old Trafford; Attendance: 73,720; Referee: Craig Pawson |
Note: Fixture was initially scheduled for 21 December, but was moved due to Manchester United's involvement in the EFL Cup.

| 26 December 2024 18 | Bournemouth | 0–0 | Crystal Palace | Bournemouth |
| 15:00 GMT | Kluivert (yellow card) 4'; Huijsen (yellow card) 69' | Report | Eze (yellow card) 7'; Guéhi (yellow card) 60' | Stadium: Dean Court; Attendance: 11,129; Referee: Thomas Bramall |
Note: Fixture was broadcast live on Amazon Prime Video.

| 29 December 2024 19 | Fulham | 2–2 | Bournemouth | Fulham |
| 15:00 GMT | Jiménez 40'; Wilson 72'; Andersen (yellow card) 83' | Report | Billing (yellow card) 39'; Christie (yellow card) 43'; Evanilson 51'; Ünal (yellow card) 82'; Ouattara 89' | Stadium: Craven Cottage; Attendance: 27,301; Referee: Robert Jones |

| 4 January 2025 20 | Bournemouth | 1–0 | Everton | Bournemouth |
| 15:00 GMT | Brooks 77', (yellow card) 90+3'; Adams (yellow card) 89' | Report | Branthwaite (yellow card) 2'; Doucouré (yellow card) 83' | Stadium: Dean Court; Attendance: 11,223; Referee: John Brooks |

| 14 January 2025 21 | Chelsea | 2–2 | Bournemouth | Fulham |
| 19:30 GMT | Palmer 13'; Jackson (yellow card) 32'; Lavia (yellow card) 52'; James 90+5' | Report | Christie (yellow card) 45+2'; Kluivert 50' (pen.); Brooks (yellow card) 55'; Semenyo 68'; Huijsen (yellow card) 87' | Stadium: Stamford Bridge; Attendance: 39,092; Referee: Robert Jones |
Note: Fixture was initially scheduled for 15 January, but was moved for live TNT Sports broadcast.

| 18 January 2025 22 | Newcastle United | 1–4 | Bournemouth | Newcastle |
| 12:30 GMT | Bruno Guimarães 25'; Joelinton (yellow card) 45+5' | Report | Kluivert 6', 44', 90+2', (yellow card) 45+6'; Adams (yellow card) 45+5'; Christie (yellow card) 70'; Ouattara (yellow card) 77'; Jebbison (yellow card) 90+3'; Kerkez 90+6', (yellow card) 90+7' | Stadium: St James' Park; Attendance: 52,227; Referee: Stuart Attwell |
Note: Fixture was originally scheduled for a 15:00 kick-off, but was moved for live TNT Sports broadcast.

| 25 January 2025 23 | Bournemouth | 5–0 | Nottingham Forest | Bournemouth |
| 15:00 GMT | Kluivert 9'; Cook (yellow card) 15'; Ouattara 55', 61', 87'; Semenyo 90+1'; Zabarnyi (yellow card) 90+3' | Report | Morato (yellow card) 59'; Sosa (yellow card) 59'; Silva (yellow card) 64' | Stadium: Dean Court; Attendance: 11,228; Referee: Craig Pawson |

| 1 February 2025 24 | Bournemouth | 0–2 | Liverpool | Bournemouth |
| 15:00 GMT | Christie (yellow card) 48'; Huijsen (yellow card) 55' | Report | Salah 30' (pen.), 75'; Gravenberch (yellow card) 49'; Mac Allister (yellow card) 54'; Van Dijk (yellow card) 66' | Stadium: Dean Court; Attendance: 11,239; Referee: Darren England |

| 15 February 2025 25 | Southampton | 1–3 | Bournemouth | Southampton |
| 15:00 GMT | Smallbone (yellow card) 10'; Sulemana 72' | Report | Cook (yellow card) 8'; Ouattara 14'; Christie 16'; Semenyo (yellow card) 32'; Tavernier (yellow card) 78', (goal) 83' | Stadium: St Mary's Stadium; Attendance: 31,037; Referee: Jarred Gillett |

| 22 February 2025 26 | Bournemouth | 0–1 | Wolverhampton Wanderers | Bournemouth |
| 15:00 GMT | Kerkez (yellow card) 22'; Zabarnyi (red card) 31'; Scott (yellow card) 85'; Arrizabalaga (yellow card) 90+7' | Report | Bueno (yellow card) 4'; Cunha 36'; João Gomes (yellow card) 44'; Doherty (yellow card) 90+1' | Stadium: Dean Court; Attendance: 11,206; Referee: Michael Salisbury |

| 25 February 2025 27 | Brighton & Hove Albion | 2–1 | Bournemouth | Brighton and Hove |
| 19:30 GMT | João Pedro 12' (pen.); Van Hecke (yellow card) 56'; Welbeck 75'; Wieffer (yellow card) 90+7' | Report | Semenyo (yellow card) 60'; Kluivert 61' | Stadium: Falmer Stadium; Attendance: 31,138; Referee: Michael Oliver |
Note: Fixture was originally scheduled for a 19:45 kick-off, but was moved for live TNT Sports broadcast.

| 9 March 2025 28 | Tottenham Hotspur | 2–2 | Bournemouth | Tottenham |
| 14:00 GMT | Bentancur (yellow card) 30'; Bissouma (yellow card) 45'; Sarr 67'; Son Heung-min 84' (pen.); Maddison (yellow card) 86' | Report | Tavernier (yellow card) 4', (goal) 42'; Evanilson 65'; Semenyo (yellow card) 69'; Huijsen (yellow card) 87' | Stadium: Tottenham Hotspur Stadium; Attendance: 61,178; Referee: John Brooks |
Note: Fixture was initially scheduled for 8 March, but was moved for live Sky Sports broadcast.

| 15 March 2025 29 | Bournemouth | 1–2 | Brentford | Bournemouth |
| 17:30 GMT | Janelt 17' (o.g.); Tavernier (yellow card) 68'; Semenyo (yellow card) 75'; Hill (yellow card) 89' | Report | Wissa 30'; Nørgaard 71' | Stadium: Dean Court; Attendance: 11,180; Referee: Craig Pawson |
Note: Fixture was originally scheduled for a 15:00 kick-off, but was moved for live Sky Sports broadcast.

| 2 April 2025 30 | Bournemouth | 1–2 | Ipswich Town | Bournemouth |
| 19:45 BST | Evanilson 67'; Huijsen (yellow card) 83' | Report | Broadhead 34'; Delap 60'; Townsend (yellow card) 73'; Philogene (yellow card) 90+6' | Stadium: Dean Court; Attendance: 11,192; Referee: Robert Jones |
Note: Fixture was initially scheduled for 1 April, but was moved due to Bournemouth's involvement in the FA Cup.

| 5 April 2025 31 | West Ham United | 2–2 | Bournemouth | Stratford |
| 15:00 BST | Füllkrug 61'; Bowen 68'; Ward-Prowse (yellow card) 78'; Kudus (yellow card) 84' | Report | Cook (yellow card) 28'; Evanilson 38', 79'; Smith (yellow card) 60' | Stadium: London Stadium; Attendance: 62,459; Referee: Tim Robinson |

| 14 April 2025 32 | Bournemouth | 1–0 | Fulham | Bournemouth |
| 20:00 BST | Semenyo 1'; Senesi (yellow card) 44'; Adams (yellow card) 86'; Cook (yellow card) 90+4' | Report | Robinson (yellow card) 61'; Cairney (yellow card) 68' | Stadium: Dean Court; Attendance: 11,195; Referee: Michael Oliver |
Note: Fixture was initially scheduled for 12 April, but was moved for live Sky Sports broadcast.

| 19 April 2025 33 | Crystal Palace | 0–0 | Bournemouth | Selhurst |
| 15:00 BST | Richards (yellow card) 29' (yellow-red card) 45+1'; Sarr (yellow card) 47'; Muñoz (yellow card) 71'; Lerma (yellow card) 86' | Report | Adams (yellow card) 18'; Scott (yellow card) 25'; Kluivert (yellow card) 47'; Ouattara (yellow card) 49' | Stadium: Selhurst Park; Attendance: 25,185; Referee: Sam Barrott |

| 27 April 2025 34 | Bournemouth | 1–1 | Manchester United | Bournemouth |
| 14:00 BST | Adams (yellow card) 21'; Semenyo 23'; Huijsen (yellow card) 63'; Kluivert (yellow card) 65'; Evanilson (red card) 70'; Smith (yellow card) 71' | Report | Dorgu (yellow card) 57'; Shaw (yellow card) 79'; Højlund 90+6' | Stadium: Dean Court; Attendance: 11,241; Referee: Peter Bankes |
Note: Fixture was initially scheduled for 26 April, but was moved for live Sky Sports broadcast.

| 3 May 2025 35 | Arsenal | 1–2 | Bournemouth | Holloway |
| 17:30 BST | Rice 34' | Report | Evanilson (yellow card) 58', (goal) 75'; Ouattara (yellow card) 64'; Huijsen 67' | Stadium: Emirates Stadium; Attendance: 60,110; Referee: Jarred Gillett |
Note: Fixture was initially scheduled for a 15:00 kick-off, but was moved for live Sky Sports broadcast.

| 10 May 2025 36 | Bournemouth | 0–1 | Aston Villa | Bournemouth |
| 17:30 BST | Scott (yellow card) 27'; Smith (yellow card) 45+4'; Zabarnyi (yellow card) 78'; Huijsen (yellow card) 83' | Report | Asensio (yellow card) 28'; Martínez (yellow card) 45+5'; Ramsey (yellow card) 45+5' (yellow-red card) 80'; Watkins 45+6'; Konsa (yellow card) 90+1' | Stadium: Dean Court; Attendance: 11,248; Referee: Stuart Attwell |
Note: Fixture was initially scheduled for a 15:00 kick-off, but was moved for live Sky Sports broadcast.

| 20 May 2025 37 | Manchester City | 3–1 | Bournemouth | Manchester |
| 20:00 BST | Marmoush 14'; Silva 38'; Kovačić (red card) 67'; Ederson (yellow card) 68'; González 89' | Report | Huijsen (yellow card) 36'; Araujo (yellow card) 44'; Cook (red card) 73'; Tavernier (yellow card) 88'; Jebbison 90+6' | Stadium: Etihad Stadium; Attendance: 52,487; Referee: Thomas Bramall |
Note: Fixture was initially scheduled for a 15:00 kick-off, but was moved for live Sky Sports broadcast. Fixture was then moved to 20 May, due to Manchester City's involvement in the FA Cup final.

| 25 May 2025 38 | Bournemouth | 2–0 | Leicester City | Bournemouth |
| 16:00 BST | Semenyo 74', 88' | Report | Thomas (yellow card) 16'; Coady (yellow card) 38' | Stadium: Dean Court; Attendance: 11,238; Referee: Lewis Smith |

=== FA Cup ===
Bournemouth were drawn at home to EFL Championship side West Bromwich Albion in the third round. They were then drawn away to Everton in the fourth round. They were then drawn at home against Wolverhampton Wanderers in the fifth round. They reached the quarter-finals for only the third time in their history, and were given another home tie against Premier League opposition, this time hosting Manchester City; Bournemouth would be eliminated after defeat.

Win Draw Loss Fixtures

| 11 January 2025 Third round | Bournemouth | 5–1 | West Bromwich Albion | Bournemouth |
| 15:00 GMT | Kluivert 27'; Ouattara 34', 44'; Semenyo 47', (yellow card) 60'; Jebbison 90+2' | Report | Taylor 14', (yellow card) 45+1'; Holgate (yellow card) 18'; Furlong (yellow card) 61' | Stadium: Dean Court; Attendance: 10,916; Referee: John Busby |

| 8 February 2025 Fourth round | Everton | 0–2 | Bournemouth | Liverpool |
| 15:00 GMT | Ndiaye (yellow card) 87' | Report | Semenyo 23' (pen.); Jebbison 43'; Adams (yellow card) 63'; Kerkez (yellow card) 79'; Huijsen (yellow card) 90+1'; Brooks (yellow card) 90+3' | Stadium: Goodison Park; Referee: John Brooks |

| 1 March 2025 Fifth round | Bournemouth | 1–1 (a.e.t.) (5–4 p) | Wolverhampton Wanderers | Bournemouth |
| 15:00 GMT | Evanilson 30'; Huijsen (yellow card) 62'; Scott (yellow card) 79'; Kluivert (yellow card) 106'; Hill (yellow card) 113'; Kerkez (yellow card) 120+1' | Report | João Gomes (yellow card) 32'; Cunha 60', (red card) 120'; Semedo (yellow card) 64'; Larsen (yellow card) 74'; Aït-Nouri (yellow card) 90+5'; Johnstone (yellow card) 120+10' | Stadium: Dean Court; Attendance: 11,021; Referee: Sam Barrott |
| | Penalties |
| | Kluivert (penalty scored); Ouattara (penalty scored); Tavernier (penalty scored); Huijsen (penalty missed); Cook (penalty scored); Sinisterra (penalty scored) | | (penalty scored) Larsen; (penalty scored) André; (penalty scored) Aït-Nouri; (penalty scored) Toti; (penalty missed) Doherty; (penalty missed) Traoré |

| 30 March 2025 Quarter-finals | Bournemouth | 1–2 | Manchester City | Bournemouth |
| 16:30 BST | Evanilson 21'; Christie (yellow card) 62'; Cook (yellow card) 70'; Kluivert (yellow card) 77' | Report | Haaland (penalty missed) 14', 49'; Khusanov (yellow card) 37'; Marmoush 63'; Nunes (yellow card) 86'; McAtee (yellow card) 90+5' | Stadium: Dean Court; Attendance: 10,954; Referee: Stuart Attwell |
Note: Fixture was broadcast live on ITV1.

=== EFL Cup ===
As a Premier League club not competing in any European competitions, Bournemouth entered the EFL Cup in the second round, and were drawn away to fellow Premier League side West Ham United, where they were eliminated from the competition after defeat.

Win Draw Loss Fixtures

| 28 August 2024 Second round | West Ham United | 1–0 | Bournemouth | Stratford |
| 19:45 BST | Todibo (yellow card) 28'; Wan-Bissaka (yellow card) 52'; Fabiański (yellow card) 78'; Bowen 88' | Report | Scott (yellow card) 30'; Evanilson (yellow card) 66' | Stadium: London Stadium; Attendance: 47,381; Referee: Peter Bankes |

== Statistics ==
=== Appearances and goals ===
Players with no appearances are not included on the list
Italics indicate a loaned in player

| No. | Pos | Nat | Player | Total | | Premier League | | FA Cup | | EFL Cup | |
| No. | Pos | Nat | Player | Apps | Goals | Apps | Goals | Apps | Goals | Apps | Goals |
|---|---|---|---|---|---|---|---|---|---|---|---|
| 2 | DF | (Spain) ESP | Dean Huijsen | 36 | 3 | 26+6 | 3 | 3 | 0 | 1 | 0 |
| 3 | DF | (Hungary) HUN | Milos Kerkez | 41 | 2 | 38 | 2 | 2+1 | 0 | 0 | 0 |
| 4 | MF | (England) ENG | Lewis Cook | 40 | 1 | 32+4 | 1 | 3 | 0 | 0+1 | 0 |
| 5 | DF | (Argentina) ARG | Marcos Senesi | 19 | 0 | 13+4 | 0 | 1 | 0 | 1 | 0 |
| 7 | MF | (Wales) WAL | David Brooks | 33 | 2 | 9+20 | 2 | 3+1 | 0 | 0 | 0 |
| 8 | MF | (England) ENG | Alex Scott | 23 | 0 | 8+12 | 0 | 1+1 | 0 | 1 | 0 |
| 9 | FW | (Brazil) BRA | Evanilson | 34 | 12 | 28+3 | 10 | 2 | 2 | 0+1 | 0 |
| 10 | MF | (Scotland) SCO | Ryan Christie | 32 | 2 | 27+2 | 2 | 2 | 0 | 1 | 0 |
| 11 | MF | (Burkina Faso) BFA | Dango Ouattara | 37 | 9 | 21+11 | 7 | 1+3 | 2 | 1 | 0 |
| 12 | MF | (United States) USA | Tyler Adams | 32 | 0 | 21+7 | 0 | 4 | 0 | 0 | 0 |
| 13 | GK | (Spain) ESP | Kepa Arrizabalaga | 35 | 0 | 31 | 0 | 4 | 0 | 0 | 0 |
| 15 | DF | (England) ENG | Adam Smith | 27 | 0 | 19+6 | 0 | 0+1 | 0 | 1 | 0 |
| 16 | MF | (England) ENG | Marcus Tavernier | 32 | 3 | 20+9 | 3 | 2 | 0 | 1 | 0 |
| 17 | MF | (Colombia) COL | Luis Sinisterra | 14 | 1 | 1+11 | 1 | 0+1 | 0 | 1 | 0 |
| 19 | FW | (Netherlands) NED | Justin Kluivert | 39 | 13 | 29+5 | 12 | 2+2 | 1 | 0+1 | 0 |
| 20 | DF | (Argentina) ARG | Julio Soler | 5 | 0 | 0+3 | 0 | 2 | 0 | 0 | 0 |
| 21 | FW | (Canada) CAN | Daniel Jebbison | 21 | 3 | 0+16 | 1 | 1+3 | 2 | 1 | 0 |
| 22 | DF | (Mexico) MEX | Julián Araujo | 13 | 0 | 7+5 | 0 | 0 | 0 | 0+1 | 0 |
| 23 | DF | (England) ENG | James Hill | 14 | 0 | 6+4 | 0 | 2+1 | 0 | 1 | 0 |
| 26 | FW | (Turkey) TUR | Enes Ünal | 17 | 2 | 2+15 | 2 | 0 | 0 | 0 | 0 |
| 27 | DF | (Ukraine) UKR | Illia Zabarnyi | 39 | 0 | 35+1 | 0 | 3 | 0 | 0 | 0 |
| 43 | FW | (England) ENG | Zain Silcott-Duberry | 2 | 0 | 0+1 | 0 | 0+1 | 0 | 0 | 0 |
| 47 | MF | (England) ENG | Ben Winterburn | 6 | 0 | 0+4 | 0 | 2 | 0 | 0 | 0 |
| 48 | DF | (England) ENG | Max Kinsey | 1 | 0 | 0 | 0 | 0+1 | 0 | 0 | 0 |
| 51 | FW | (England) ENG | Remy Rees-Dottin | 2 | 0 | 0+1 | 0 | 0+1 | 0 | 0 | 0 |
Players who featured but departed the club on loan during the season:
| 1 | GK | (Brazil) BRA | Neto | 3 | 0 | 2 | 0 | 0 | 0 | 1 | 0 |
| 29 | MF | (Denmark) DEN | Philip Billing | 10 | 0 | 1+9 | 0 | 0 | 0 | 0 | 0 |
| 37 | DF | (England) ENG | Max Aarons | 4 | 0 | 1+2 | 0 | 1 | 0 | 0 | 0 |
| 42 | GK | (Republic of Ireland) IRL | Mark Travers | 5 | 0 | 5 | 0 | 0 | 0 | 0 | 0 |
