= Max Kinsey =

English association football player (born 2005)

Personal information
- Full name: Maxwell Benjamin Kinsey-Wellings
- Date of birth: 2 February 2005 (age 21)
- Place of birth: Guildford, England
- Height: 1.84 m (6 ft 1/2 in)
- Position: Defender

Team information
- Current team: Truro City
- Number: 26

Youth career
- 2014–2015: Chelsea
- 2015–2021: Southampton
- 2021–2026: Bournemouth

Senior career*
Years	Team	Apps	(Gls)
2023–2026	Bournemouth	0	(0)
2023	→ Gosport Borough (loan)	3	(1)
2023	→ Wimborne Town (loan)	4	(0)
2025–2026	→ Truro City (loan)	14	(0)
2026–	Truro City	0	(0)
- * Club domestic league appearances and goals as of 17:20 (UTC) 7 August 2026

Maxwell Benjamin Kinsey-Wellings (born 2 February 2005) is an English professional footballer who plays as a defender for National League club Truro City.

== Career ==
Having previously been in the football academies at Chelsea and Southampton prior to joining Bournemouth in the summer of 2021. With the Bournemouth U18 side he won back-to-back EFL Youth Alliance South West division titles in 2022 and 2023.

He had loan spells at Wimborne Town and Gosport Borough in 2023. He had his first inclusion in the Bournemouth first team squad during the 2022–23 season, being an unused substitute for the first time against Brighton and Hove Albion in the Premier League.

During the summer of 2024 he travelled with the Bournemouth first-team in pre-season and captained the Bournemouth development side during the 2024–25 season. He made his professional debut on 11 January 2025 in the FA Cup against West Bromwich Albion.

=== Truro City (loan) ===
On 10 July 2025 Kinsey joined National League side Truro City on a season long loan. On 27 September Kinsey made his first league appearance for Truro, getting an assist in the Tinners’ 5–0 win over Morecambe.

== Career statistics ==
As of match played on 17 February 2026

Appearances and goals by club, season and competition
Club	Season	League			FA Cup		League Cup (Note: Includes EFL Cup, National League Cup)		Total	
Club	Season	Division	Apps	Goals	Apps	Goals	Apps	Goals	Apps	Goals
Bournemouth
Bournemouth	2022–23	Premier League	0	0	0	0	0	0	0	0
Bournemouth	2023–24	Premier League	0	0	0	0	0	0	0	0
Bournemouth	2024–25	Premier League	0	0	1	0	0	0	1	0
Bournemouth	Total		0	0	1	0	0	0	1	0
Truro City (loan)
Truro City (loan)	2025–26	National League	4	0	0	0	5	0	9	0
Career total			4	0	1	0	5	0	10	0
