= Dean Huijsen =

Footballer (born 2005)

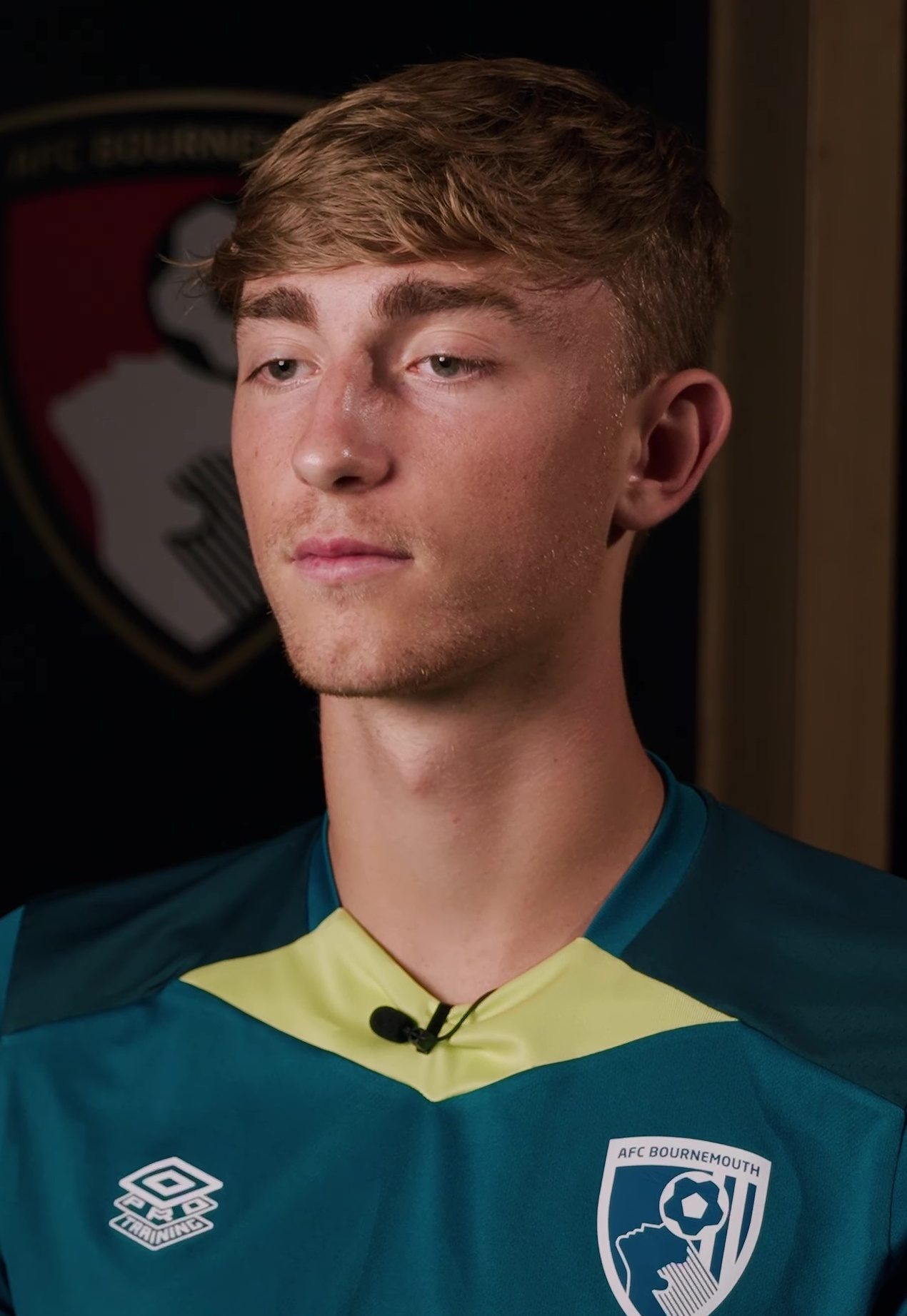
- Huijsen with Bournemouth in 2024

Personal information
- Full name: Dean Donny Huijsen Wijsmuller
- Date of birth: 14 April 2005 (age 21)
- Place of birth: Amsterdam, Netherlands
- Height: 1.96 m (6 ft 5 in)
- Position: Centre-back

Team information
- Current team: Real Madrid
- Number: 4

Youth career
- 2010–2015: Costa Unida CF
- 2015–2021: Málaga
- 2021–2023: Juventus

Senior career*
Years	Team	Apps	(Gls)
2023	Juventus Next Gen	27	(1)
2023–2024	Juventus	1	(0)
2024	→ Roma (loan)	13	(2)
2024–2025	Bournemouth	32	(3)
2025–	Real Madrid	39	(2)

International career^{‡}
2021–2022	Netherlands U17	11	(2)
2022–2023	Netherlands U18	4	(0)
2023–2024	Netherlands U19	3	(0)
2024	Spain U21	7	(1)
2025–	Spain	10	(0)
Medal record
Men's football
Representing Netherlands
UEFA European Under-17 Championship
Runner-up	2022 Israel
Representing Spain
UEFA Nations League
Runner-up	2025 Germany
- * Club domestic league appearances and goals as of 22:05, 21 November 2026 (UTC) ‡ National team caps and goals as of 22:15, 15 November 2026 (UTC)

Dean Donny Huijsen Wijsmuller (Spanish: [ˈdiŋ ˈxawsen], Dutch: [ˈdiːn ˈɦœy.sə(n)]; born 14 April 2005) is a professional footballer who plays as a centre-back for La Liga club Real Madrid. Born in the Netherlands, he plays for the Spain national team.

Huijsen made his senior debut for Juventus's reserve team Juventus Next Gen in January 2023, and made his Serie A debut with the first team the following October. Following a loan spell at Roma, Huijsen signed for Premier League side Bournemouth in July 2024. One year later in May 2025, he moved to La Liga club Real Madrid.

== Early life ==
Huijsen was born in Amsterdam to Donny Huijsen and Macha Wijsmuller. Donny played for Jong Ajax and had a professional career in the Eredivisie and the Eerste Divisie. Dean can speak Dutch, Spanish, Italian and English. The family relocated to Marbella, Andalusia, Spain, when he was five years old; he became a Spanish citizen in February 2024. Huijsen's idol growing up was Sergio Ramos.

== Club career ==
=== Early career ===
Huijsen began playing with Costa Unida CF de Marbella before joining Málaga's youth set-up in 2015, at age 10.

=== Juventus ===
In May 2021, Huijsen joined Juventus, playing for their U17s. Ahead of the 2022–23 season, he moved up the U19s and he scored six goals in 14 matches until November 2022. He also featured in two first-team friendlies against Standard Liège and Rijeka in December 2022.

In early January 2023, Huijsen was promoted to Juventus Next Gen, the reserve team of Juventus. He made his professional debut on 8 January, starting in a 2–1 league loss against Pordenone. On 15 February, Huijsen scored his first two professional goals in the second leg of a Coppa Italia Serie C semi-final match against Foggia, helping his team win the tie on penalties. On 2 April, he scored his first goal in Serie C, in a 3–1 home loss to Feralpisalò.

In June 2023, Huijsen renewed his contract with Juventus until 2027. On 22 October, he made his Serie A debut, coming off the bench in the 78th minute to replace Federico Gatti in a 1–0 away win over AC Milan. On 7 November, Juventus announced that Huijsen alongside his Next Gen teammate Kenan Yıldız had been promoted to the first team.

==== Loan to Roma ====
Huijsen was loaned to fellow Italian side Roma on 6 January 2024 until the end of the 2023–24 season. He made his debut with the Giallorossi the following day, playing the entire second half in a home league draw against Atalanta. In early February, Roma's head coach Daniele De Rossi excluded him from the team's UEFA list for the Europa League knock-out phase.

Huijsen scored his first Serie A goal on 5 February, sealing Roma's 4–0 win against Cagliari.

=== Bournemouth ===
On 30 July 2024, Huijsen was signed from Juventus by Premier League club Bournemouth on a six-year deal, for an initial fee of €15.2 million, which could rise to €18.2 million. He made his debut for the Cherries on 17 August in a 1–1 draw against Nottingham Forest, and won nine aerial duels. On 5 December 2024, he scored his first goal for the club, with a header in a 1–0 home win over Tottenham Hotspur. He thus became the youngest-ever goalscorer for the club in the Premier League.

On 19 June 2025, it was announced that Huijsen was one of six nominees for the PFA Young Player of the Year award for his performances in the previous season with Bournemouth.

=== Real Madrid ===
On 17 May 2025, La Liga club Real Madrid announced the signing of Huijsen, with the player joining Los Blancos on a contract until July 2030. The deal was worth £50 million (€59.5 million), with Madrid triggering his release clause. He was officially presented as a Real Madrid player on 9 June, receiving the number 24 shirt.

Huijsen made his debut for the club at the 2025 FIFA Club World Cup in a group stage match against Al-Hilal on 18 June, which resulted in a 1–1 draw. He made his La Liga debut for Madrid on 19 August 2025, in a 1–0 victory over Osasuna.

In February 2026, Huijsen faced allegations of racism after he reposted an image on Instagram containing derogatory comments mocking the eye shape of Asian people. Real Madrid published an apology attributed to the player on the club's official Weibo account.

== International career ==
=== Netherlands ===
Huijsen represented the Netherlands at various youth international levels, playing for the under-17 and under-19 national teams.

In May 2022, Huijsen was included in the Dutch under-17 squad that took part in the UEFA European Under-17 Championship in Israel, where he scored two penalties in the group stage matches against France and Poland, as Oranje eventually finished as runners-up after losing to France in the final.

=== Spain ===
On 15 March 2024, Huijsen was called up by the Spain national under-21 team to play the 2025 UEFA European Under-21 Championship qualification Group B match against Belgium. twelve months later, On 17 March 2025, he was called up by the senior side for the Nations League quarter-finals against the Netherlands. He was covering Iñigo Martínez's absence due to injury and made his debut coming on in the 41st minute, replacing Pau Cubarsí. The match ended 2–2, Huijsen was one of Spain's best players and received a hostile reception from home fans in the Stadion Feijenoord for switching nations in order to play for Spain. He called his debut a "dream". Huijsen started the second leg and was praised for an assist in additional extra time which Lamine Yamal scored from. He was left out of the Spain squad that won the 2026 FIFA World Cup.

== Style of play ==
Huijsen is a physical 1.96 m-tall centre-back. He is mainly right-footed but can also use his left foot. He has an eye for the goal and can also take penalty kicks, making him a ball-playing defender who can build up attacks.

== Career statistics ==
=== Club ===
As of match played 21 November 2026

Appearances and goals by club, season and competition
Club	Season	League			National cup (Note: Includes Coppa Italia, FA Cup, Copa del Rey)		League cup (Note: Includes EFL Cup)		Europe		Other		Total	
Club	Season	Division	Apps	Goals	Apps	Goals	Apps	Goals	Apps	Goals	Apps	Goals	Apps	Goals
Juventus Next Gen	2022–23	Serie C	16	1	—		—		—		3 (Note: Appearances in Coppa Italia Serie C)	2	19	3
Juventus Next Gen	2023–24	Serie C	11	0	—		—		—		—		11	0
Juventus Next Gen	Total		27	1	—		—		—		3	2	30	3
Juventus	2023–24	Serie A	1	0	0	0	—		—		—		1	0
Roma (loan)	2023–24	Serie A	13	2	1	0	—		0	0	—		14	2
Bournemouth	2024–25	Premier League	32	3	3	0	1	0	—		—		36	3
Real Madrid	2024–25	La Liga	—		—		—		—		5 (Note: Appearances in FIFA Club World Cup)	0	5	0
Real Madrid	2025–26	La Liga	28	2	2	0	—		9 (Note: Appearances in UEFA Champions League)	0	1 (Note: Appearance in Supercopa de España)	0	40	2
Real Madrid	2026–27	La Liga	11	0	0	0	—		2	0	0	0	13	0
Real Madrid	Total		39	2	2	0	—		11	0	6	0	58	2
Career total			112	8	6	0	1	0	11	0	9	2	139	10

=== International ===
As of match played 15 November 2026

Appearances and goals by national team and year
National team	Year	Apps	Goals
Spain	2025	6	0
Spain	2026	4	0
Total		10	0

== Honours ==
Juventus Next Gen

- Coppa Italia Serie C runner-up: 2022–23

Netherlands U17

- UEFA European Under-17 Championship runners-up: 2022

Spain

- UEFA Nations League runner-up: 2024–25

=== Individual ===
- IFFHS Men's World Youth (U20) Team: 2025
