= Callan McKenna =

Scottish footballer (born 2006)

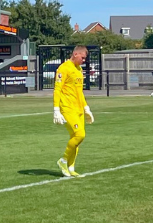

Personal information
- Full name: Callan Thomas McKenna
- Date of birth: 22 December 2006 (age 19)
- Place of birth: Rutherglen, Scotland
- Height: 1.88 m (6 ft 2 in)
- Position: Goalkeeper

Team information
- Current team: Bournemouth

Youth career
- –2018: Hibernian
- 2018–2023: Queen's Park

Senior career*
Years	Team	Apps	(Gls)
2023–2024	Queen's Park	7	(0)
2024–	Bournemouth	0	(0)

International career^{‡}
2022–	Scotland U17	4	(0)
2023–	Scotland U18	2	(0)
- * Club domestic league appearances and goals as of 14 December 2023 ‡ National team caps and goals as of 15 August 2023; 00:15 (UTC)

Callan Thomas McKenna (born 22 December 2006) is a Scottish footballer who plays as a goalkeeper for Premier League club Bournemouth. He is a Scotland youth international.

== Club career ==
From Fernhill, South Lanarkshire, McKenna played age group football for Hibernian prior to joining Queen's Park at twelve years old. A few weeks after turning sixteen, he signed his first professional contract in January 2023. He made his professional debut for Queen's Park as a 16-year-old on 15 July 2023 in the Scottish League Cup against East Fife. He made his Scottish Championship debut on 5 August 2023 against Inverness Caledonian Thistle (being preferred over Calum Ferrie who was voted the division's best goalkeeper in the previous campaign). His performance drew comparisons with David Marshall, and led to reports of scouts from Premier League and EFL Championship clubs monitoring his progress. On 1 February 2024, Premier League club Bournemouth signed McKenna in a deal worth £300,000.

== International career ==
McKenna was selected for the Scotland squad for the 2023 UEFA European Under-17 Championship. He has also represented the Scotland national under-18 football team. On 3 June 2025, McKenna was added to the senior squad as a ‘training player’.

On 6 June 2025, following injuries to Angus Gunn and Robby McCrorie before and during a 3–1 friendly defeat to Iceland at Hampden Park, and amidst an injury crisis among Scottish goalkeepers (with Craig Gordon, Liam Kelly and Zander Clark all unavailable), senior head coach Steve Clarke confirmed McKenna would travel as part of the 23-man squad for a friendly against Liechtenstein on 9 June 2025.
