= Antoine Semenyo =

Ghana international footballer (born 2000)

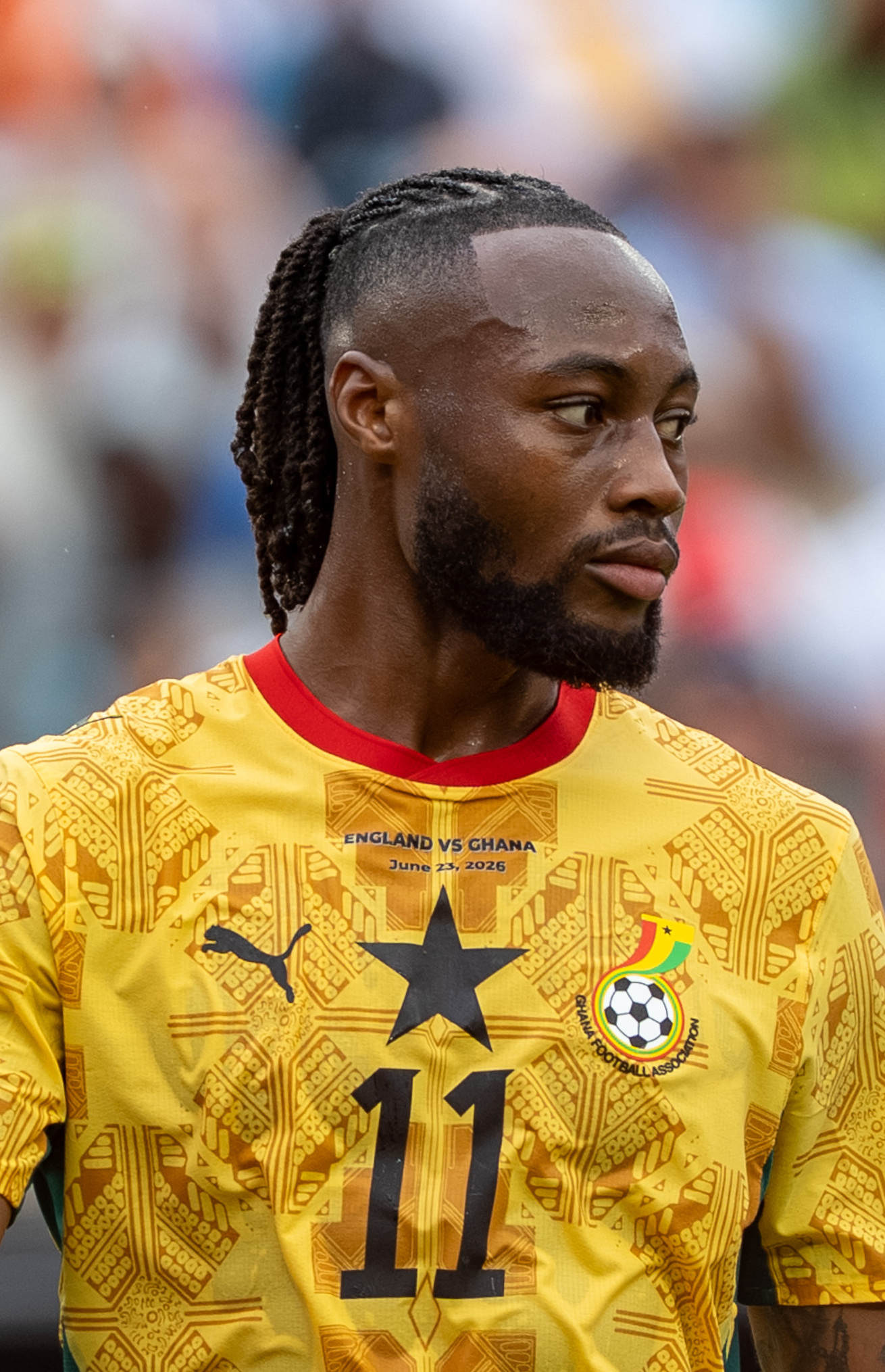
- Semenyo with Ghana in 2026

Personal information
- Full name: Antoine Serlom Semenyo
- Date of birth: 7 January 2000 (age 26)
- Place of birth: Chelsea, London, England
- Height: 1.85 m (6 ft 1 in)
- Position: Winger

Team information
- Current team: Manchester City
- Number: 42

Youth career
- 2017–2018: Bristol City

Senior career*
Years	Team	Apps	(Gls)
2017	Highworth Town	0	(0)
2018–2023	Bristol City	112	(16)
2018	→ Bath City (loan)	14	(3)
2018–2019	→ Newport County (loan)	21	(3)
2020	→ Sunderland (loan)	7	(0)
2023–2026	Bournemouth	101	(30)
2026–	Manchester City	24	(9)

International career^{‡}
2022–	Ghana	38	(3)
- * Club domestic league appearances and goals as of 23:48, 20 September 2026 (UTC) ‡ National team caps and goals as of 11:22, 4 July 2026 (UTC)

Antoine Serlom Semenyo (born 7 January 2000) is a professional footballer who plays as a winger or wide midfielder for Premier League club Manchester City. Born in England, he plays for the Ghana national team.

He made his professional debut for Bristol City in the EFL Championship in 2018, and became a regular player from 2020 after loans to other clubs. In January 2023, he transferred to Bournemouth of the Premier League for a £10 million fee. Three years later, he signed for Manchester City for a reported fee of £64 million and won the EFL Cup and FA Cup in his first half-season, scoring the only goal of the latter final.

Semenyo made his international debut for Ghana in 2022. He was selected for the FIFA World Cup in 2022 and 2026, and the 2023 Africa Cup of Nations.

== Club career ==
Semenyo had unsuccessful trials for London clubs Arsenal, Tottenham Hotspur and Millwall. At the age of 15, he was rejected by Crystal Palace after an eight-week trial. He initially decided to give up on becoming a professional footballer before Dave Hockaday convinced him to join his youth academy program at South Gloucestershire and Stroud College. Semenyo's development saw Birmingham City, Crystal Palace and Bristol City show interest in signing him. Prior to signing for Bristol City's academy in September 2017, Semenyo had a brief spell at Hellenic League side Highworth Town, playing the final 13 minutes of an FA Cup preliminary round tie against Marlow on 20 August 2017.

=== Bristol City ===
==== Early appearances and loans ====
Semenyo signed his first professional contract in January 2018 and joined Bath City on a short-term loan. He scored six goals from 16 appearances for the National League South club before returning to Bristol City. He made his Bristol City debut on the final day of the 2017–18 season coming on as a second-half substitute for Lloyd Kelly in the 3–2 loss to Sheffield United at Ashton Gate.

On 18 July 2018, Semenyo joined EFL League Two club Newport County on a season-long loan. He made his Newport debut in a 3–0 defeat against Mansfield Town on 4 August 2018 as a second-half substitute and scored his first goal for the club in a 4–1 EFL Cup first round win over Cambridge United. At Newport, he began to play on the wing rather than his original position of striker. On 6 January 2019, he played the full 90 minutes as Newport knocked Premier League club Leicester City out of the FA Cup in the third round with a 2–1 win. He also played the entirety of the 1–1 draw away at EFL Championship side Middlesbrough on 26 January. The following day, he was recalled by Bristol city after making 32 appearances in all competitions for the Welsh club.

Upon his return to Bristol City he was allocated the shirt number 18 and named as a substitute for the EFL Championship match away to Blackburn Rovers on 9 February 2019. On 2 March, he appeared as a 53rd-minute substitute for Callum O'Dowda in 1–1 draw with Preston North End and, seven days later, he made his first start for the club in a 1–0 home loss to Leeds United. On 27 April 2019, Semenyo controversially received his first career red card against Derby County for a challenge on Tom Huddlestone. In June 2019, he signed a new four-year contract with the club.

After making eleven appearances for Bristol City, in the first half of the 2019–20 season, Semenyo was linked with a loan move to Sunderland, Doncaster Rovers and a return to Newport County. On 31 January 2020, Semenyo joined EFL League One club Sunderland on loan for the remainder of the season. He made seven appearances for Sunderland without scoring, making his only start in his final appearance at Bristol Rovers on 10 March 2020. After the season was curtailed by the COVID-19 pandemic, he returned to Bristol City.

==== First team breakthrough ====
Semenyo began the 2020–21 by scoring his first goal for Bristol City in an EFL Cup first round tie against Exeter City on 5 September 2020. Eleven days later, he assisted goals for Chris Martin and Kasey Palmer, before scoring himself in a 4–0 win over Northampton Town in the second round of the same competition.

During November 2020, he recorded assists in three consecutive EFL Championship matches against Huddersfield Town, Cardiff City and Derby County. He ended the season having played fifty competitive games, scoring five and assisting seven goals. He was named Bristol City's Young Player of the Year on 10 May 2021.

During the 2021–22 season, Semenyo registered eight goals and twelve assists in 32 games across all competitions. He won the EFL Championship Player of the Month award for January 2022 after scoring three goals and getting three assists.

Semenyo began the 2022–23 season by scoring in a 3–1 EFL Cup first round win over Wycombe Wanderers on 24 August. He followed this up by scoring in his first two EFL Championship appearances of the season, against Blackpool on 27 August and Huddersfield Town on 31 August.

During January 2023, he scored in three consecutive league matches against Coventry City, Birmingham City and Blackburn Rovers, as well as an FA Cup third round tie against Swansea City. This form saw reported interest from Premier League clubs Southampton and Crystal Palace, as well as two rejected offers from Bournemouth.

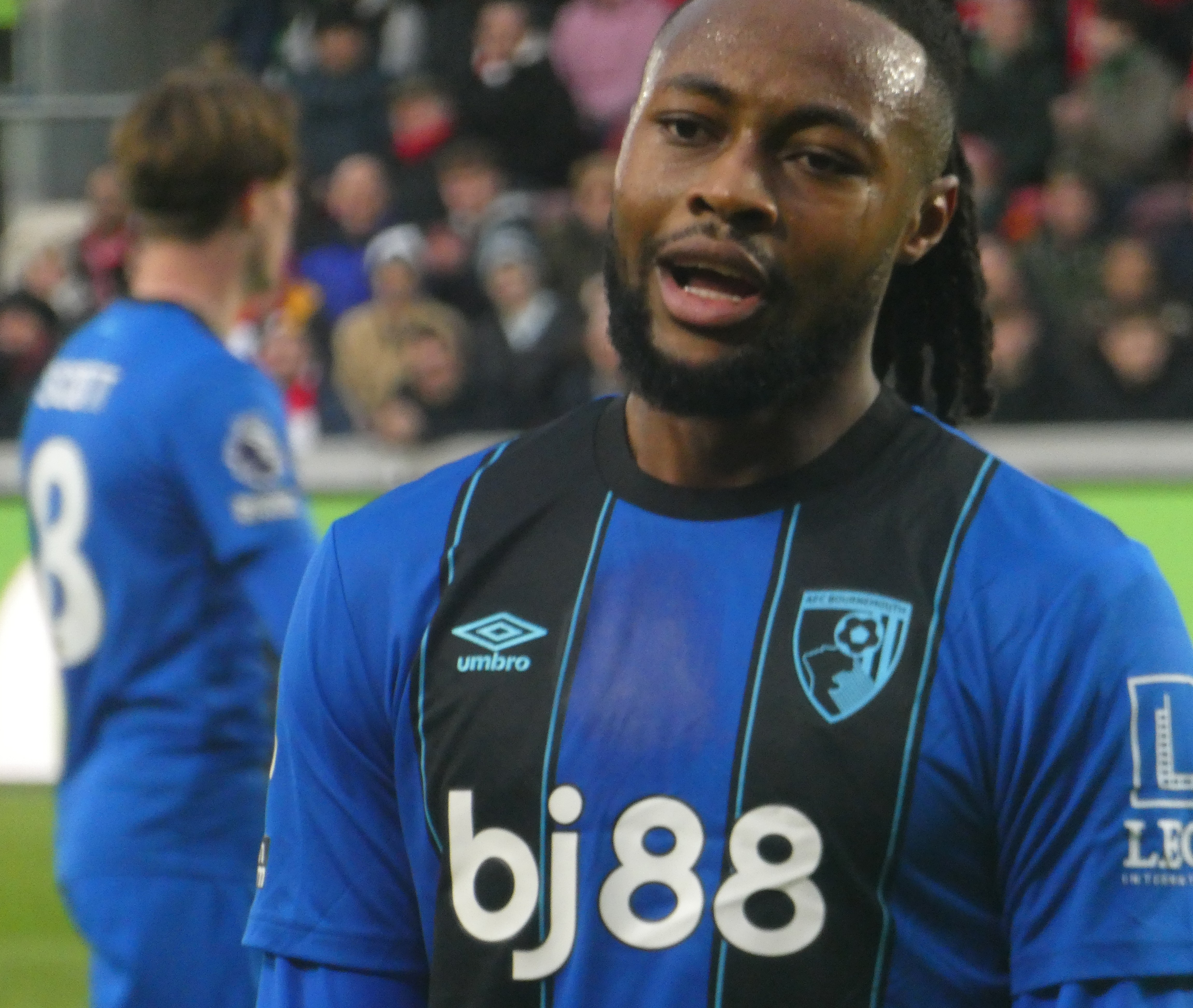
Semenyo playing for Bournemouth in 2025

=== Bournemouth ===
On 27 January 2023, Semenyo completed a transfer to Bournemouth worth £10 million on a four-and-a-half-year contract. He made his debut for the club in 1–0 Premier League loss at Brighton & Hove Albion on 4 February and scored his first goal on 30 April 2023 in a 4–1 home win over Leeds United.

On 19 August 2023, Bournemouth's first away match of the 2023–24 Premier League season, Semenyo gave the team a 1–0 lead over Liverpool at Anfield to register his second goal for the club. On 28 October, he scored in Bournemouth's first league win of the season and first under Andoni Iraola as they beat Burnley 2–1 in matchday 10 of the Premier League. He ended his first full Premier League season with eight goals and two assists from 33 appearances.

On 8 July 2024, he signed a new contract with the club until 2029. Semenyo began the 2024–25 season by scoring an 86th-minute equaliser in a 1–1 draw with Nottingham Forest on 17 August. Two weeks later he scored Bournemouth's first goal of a 3–2 comeback win over Everton at Goodison Park. On 2 November 2024, he scored in Bournemouth's 2–1 win over Premier League champions Manchester City at Dean Court, ending City's eleven-month unbeaten run in the competition. His fifth goal of the season came in a 3–0 win over Manchester United at Old Trafford on 22 December.

On 25 January 2025, he scored the fifth goal of Bournemouth's 5–0 win over Nottingham Forest, extending the club's unbeaten run in the Premier League to eleven matches. On 14 April, Semenyo scored his tenth goal of the season to give Bournemouth a 1–0 win over Fulham and end their run of six matches without a Premier League win. His goal came after 53 seconds of the match, making it Bournemouth's third-fastest Premier League goal. On 25 May, Semenyo scored both goals in a 2–0 win over Leicester City to end the season with a personal best eleven Premier League goals.

On 1 July 2025, Semenyo signed a contract extension at Bournemouth until 2030.

On 15 August, Semenyo scored two goals away against Liverpool in the opening match of the 2025–26 Premier League season. His goals came in the 64th and 76th minutes to tie the match at 2–2 after Bournemouth had trailed 2–0 to the league champions, however, the match ended in a 4–2 defeat with Liverpool scoring two late goals. He continued his strong start to the season with goals against Brighton and Hove Albion and Leeds United in September, before scoring two goals and assisting Justin Kluivert in a 3–1 win over Fulham on 3 October, taking him to six goals from the opening seven Premier League matches.

After going seven matches without scoring, Semenyo scored in a 4–4 draw with Manchester United on 15 December. He followed this up with goals against Burnley and Brentford in Bournemouth's next two matches.

On 7 January 2026, his 26th birthday, having been strongly linked with a move to Manchester City in the January transfer window, Semenyo scored in his final game for Bournemouth; a last-minute winner in a 3–2 win against Tottenham Hotspur at Vitality Stadium, ending the Cherries' eleven-match run without a win.

=== Manchester City ===
On 9 January 2026, Manchester City announced the signing of Semenyo on a five-and-a-half-year contract for a reported fee of £64 million. He made an immediate impact on his debut the following day, scoring once and providing an assist in a 10–1 FA Cup victory over Exeter City. Three days later, he opened the scoring in a 2–0 away win against Newcastle United in the first leg of the EFL Cup semi-final, helping City progress 5–1 on aggregate to reach the 2026 EFL Cup final.

On 24 January, Semenyo scored his first Premier League goal for City in a 2–0 victory over Wolverhampton Wanderers. His impressive run of form throughout February earned him the Premier League Player of the Month award. On 22 March, he featured in Manchester City's 2–0 victory over Arsenal in the EFL Cup final, securing his first trophy with the club.

On 16 May, Semenyo scored the decisive goal in the 2026 FA Cup final against Chelsea, producing a backheel finish to seal a 1–0 victory and deliver the trophy to Manchester City.

On 19 October 2026, Manchester City manager Enzo Maresca confirmed that Semenyo could be sidelined for approximately eight weeks after sustaining a knee injury during a Premier League match against Ipswich Town on 17 October. Initial concerns about a possible anterior cruciate ligament (ACL) injury were eased following medical scans, with a return anticipated around December 2026.

== International career ==
Semenyo has said that his family were passionate supporters of the Ghana national team. He remembers watching Ghana's 2010 World Cup quarter-final defeat, which he says left a lasting impression.

Semenyo was called up to the Ghana national team on 26 May 2022 and made his debut for the Black Stars in a 3–0 2023 Africa Cup of Nations qualification win over Madagascar on 1 June.

On 14 November 2022, Semenyo was included in Ghana's 26-man squad for the 2022 World Cup in Qatar. He scored his first international goal in the team's final warm-up match for the tournament, a 2–0 win over Switzerland on 17 November. At the tournament finals, he made two substitute appearances in the group matches against Portugal and Uruguay.

Semenyo's first competitive goal for Ghana came in the sixth minute of stoppage time in an Africa Cup of Nations qualifier against Angola on 23 March 2023, giving the Black Stars a 1–0 win.

In January 2024, he was named in Ghana's squad for the 2023 Africa Cup of Nations. He started all three group matches at the tournament as Ghana were eliminated with two draws and a loss.

On 2 June 2026, Semenyo was named by Ghana's coach Carlos Queiroz in his list of 26 players in order to compete in the 2026 FIFA World Cup.

== Personal life ==
Semenyo was born in England and is of Ghanaian descent. Semenyo's father, Larry, is a former footballer, having played as a midfielder for Okwawu United in the Ghana Premier League. Antoine also holds French citizenship from his mother. Semenyo's younger brother Jai is also a professional footballer, currently at Championnat National 1 side FC Lorient B.

On 18 November 2025, Semenyo proposed to his long-time girlfriend, Jordeen Buckley.

Semenyo is a Christian. He has said, “God is my inspiration. [He] is the only person I fear.”

== Career statistics ==
=== Club ===
As of match played 4 November 2026

Appearances and goals by club, season and competition
Club	Season	League			FA Cup		EFL Cup		Europe		Other		Total	
Club	Season	Division	Apps	Goals	Apps	Goals	Apps	Goals	Apps	Goals	Apps	Goals	Apps	Goals
Bristol City	2017–18	Championship	1	0	0	0	0	0	—		—		1	0
Bristol City	2018–19	Championship	4	0	—		—		—		—		4	0
Bristol City	2019–20	Championship	9	0	1	0	1	0	—		—		11	0
Bristol City	2020–21	Championship	44	2	3	1	3	2	—		—		50	5
Bristol City	2021–22	Championship	31	8	1	0	0	0	—		—		32	8
Bristol City	2022–23	Championship	23	6	2	1	2	1	—		—		27	8
Bristol City	Total		112	16	7	2	6	3	—		—		125	21
Bath City (loan)	2017–18	National League South	14	3	0	0	—		—		2 (Note: Appearances in Somerset Premier Cup)	3	16	6
Newport County (loan)	2018–19	League Two	21	3	5	0	2	1	—		4 (Note: Appearances in EFL Trophy)	2	32	6
Sunderland (loan)	2019–20	League One	7	0	—		—		—		—		7	0
Bournemouth	2022–23	Premier League	11	1	—		—		—		—		11	1
Bournemouth	2023–24	Premier League	33	8	1	0	2	0	—		—		36	8
Bournemouth	2024–25	Premier League	37	11	4	2	1	0	—		—		42	13
Bournemouth	2025–26	Premier League	20	10	—		1	0	—		—		21	10
Bournemouth	Total		101	30	5	2	4	0	—		—		110	32
Manchester City	2025–26	Premier League	17	7	5	3	3	1	2 (Note: Appearances in UEFA Champions League)	0	—		27	11
Manchester City	2026–27	Premier League	7	2	0	0	0	0	2	0	1 (Note: Appearance in FA Community Shield)	0	10	2
Manchester City	Total		24	9	5	3	3	1	4	0	1	0	37	13
Career total			279	61	22	7	14	5	4	0	7	5	326	78

=== International ===
As of match played 3 July 2026

Appearances and goals by national team and year
National team	Year	Apps	Goals
Ghana	2022	6	1
Ghana	2023	8	1
Ghana	2024	11	0
Ghana	2025	7	1
Ghana	2026	6	0
Total		38	3

Scores and results list Ghana's goal tally first, score column indicates score after each Semenyo goal.

List of international goals scored by Antoine Semenyo
No.	Date	Venue	Opponent	Score	Result	Competition
1	17 November 2022	Zayed Sports City Stadium, Abu Dhabi, United Arab Emirates	Switzerland	2–0	2–0	Friendly
2	23 March 2023	Baba Yara Sports Stadium, Kumasi, Ghana	Angola	1–0	1–0	2023 Africa Cup of Nations qualification
3	21 March 2025	Accra Sports Stadium, Accra, Ghana	Chad	1–0	5–0	2026 FIFA World Cup qualification

== Honours ==
Manchester City

- FA Cup: 2025–26
- EFL Cup: 2025–26

Individual

- Premier League Player of the Month: February 2026
- Premier League Fan Team of the Season: 2025–26
- PFA Team of the Year: 2025–26
- EFL Championship Player of the Month: January 2022
- Bristol City Young Player of the Year: 2021–22
- PFA Premier League Fans’ Player of the Month: September 2025
- SWAG Foreign Footballer of the Year: 2025
