= Belarus national football team results (2010–present) =

This is a list of Belarus national football team results from 2010 to the present day.

== Results ==
=== 2010 ===
3 March International Friendly	Belarus	3–1	Armenia	Antalya, Turkey
15:00 UTC+2	Putsila 58'; A. Hleb 73'; Rodionov 84'	Report	Pachadzhyan 59'	Stadium: Antalya Atatürk Stadium; Attendance: 100; Referee: Audrius Žuta (Lithuania)

27 May International Friendly	Honduras	2–2	Belarus	Villach, Austria
18:30 UTC+2	De León 25'; Welcome 71'	Report	Putsila 56', 60'	Stadium: Stadion Lind; Attendance: 700; Referee: René Eisner (Austria)

30 May International Friendly	South Korea	0–1	Belarus	Kufstein, Austria
15:00 UTC+2		Report	Kislyak 53'	Stadium: Kufstein Arena; Attendance: 900; Referee: Bernhard Brugger (Austria)

2 June International Friendly	Belarus	0–1	Sweden	Minsk, Belarus
20:30 UTC+3		Report	Wilhelmsson 47'	Stadium: Dinamo Stadium; Attendance: 12,000; Referee: Aleksey Nikolaev (Russia)

11 August International Friendly	Lithuania	0–2	Belarus	Kaunas, Lithuania
18:00 UTC+3		Report	V. Hleb 48', 90+2'	Stadium: Darius and Girėnas Stadium; Attendance: 1,700; Referee: Igor Satchi (Moldova)

3 September UEFA Euro 2012 qualifying Group D	France	0–1	Belarus	Saint-Denis, France
21:00 UTC+2		Report	Kislyak 86'	Stadium: Stade de France; Attendance: 76,395; Referee: Willie Collum (Scotland)

7 September UEFA Euro 2012 qualifying Group D	Belarus	0–0	Romania	Minsk, Belarus
20:30 UTC+3		Report		Stadium: Dinamo Stadium; Attendance: 26,354; Referee: Pavel Kralovec (Czech Republic)

8 October UEFA Euro 2012 qualifying Group D	Luxembourg	0–0	Belarus	Luxembourg City, Luxembourg
20:15 UTC+2		Report		Stadium: Stade Josy Barthel; Attendance: 1,857; Referee: Aleksandar Stavrev (Macedonia)

12 October UEFA Euro 2012 qualifying Group D	Belarus	2–0	Albania	Minsk, Belarus
20:30 UTC+3	Rodionov 10'; Krivets 77'	Report		Stadium: Dinamo Stadium; Attendance: 7,000; Referee: Peter Rasmussen (Denmark)

17 November International Friendly	Oman	0–4	Belarus	Seeb, Oman
16:30 UTC+4		Report	Martynovich 5', 11'; V. Hleb 35'; Rodionov 57' (pen.)	Stadium: Al-Seeb Stadium; Attendance: 1,000; Referee: Abdul Rahman Al Amri (Saudi Arabia)

=== 2011 ===
9 February International Friendly	Belarus	1–1	Kazakhstan	Antalya, Turkey
17:00 UTC+2	V. Hleb 45+3'	Report	Ostapenko 90'	Stadium: Antalya Atatürk Stadium; Attendance: 300; Referee: Viaceslav Banari (Moldova)

26 March UEFA Euro 2012 qualifying Group D	Albania	1–0	Belarus	Tirana, Albania
20:00 UTC+1	Salihi 62'	Report		Stadium: Qemal Stafa Stadium; Attendance: 13,826; Referee: Markus Strömbergsson (Sweden)

29 March International Friendly	Canada	1–0	Belarus	Antalya, Turkey
18:00 UTC+3	Hainault 58'	Report		Stadium: Antalya Atatürk Stadium; Attendance: 100; Referee: Yunus Yıldırım (Turkey)

3 June UEFA Euro 2012 qualifying Group D	Belarus	1–1	France	Minsk, Belarus
21:45 UTC+3	Abidal 20' (o.g.)	Report	Malouda 22'	Stadium: Dinamo Stadium; Attendance: 26,500; Referee: David Fernández Borbalán (Spain)

7 June UEFA Euro 2012 qualifying Group D	Belarus	2–0	Luxembourg	Minsk, Belarus
20:00 UTC+3	Kornilenko 48' (pen.); Putsila 73'	Report		Stadium: Dinamo Stadium; Attendance: 9,500; Referee: Anar Salmanov (Azerbaijan)

10 August International Friendly	Belarus	1–0	Bulgaria	Minsk, Belarus
20:00 UTC+3	Kislyak 33'	Report		Stadium: Dinamo Stadium; Attendance: 6,500; Referee: Nerijus Dunauskas (Lithuania)

2 September UEFA Euro 2012 qualifying Group D	Belarus	0–2	Bosnia and Herzegovina	Minsk, Belarus
20:30 UTC+3		Report	Salihović 22' (pen.); Medunjanin 24'	Stadium: Dinamo Stadium; Attendance: 28,500; Referee: Viktor Kassai (Hungary)

6 September UEFA Euro 2012 qualifying Group D	Bosnia and Herzegovina	1–0	Belarus	Zenica, Bosnia and Herzegovina
20:15 UTC+2	Misimović 87'	Report		Stadium: Bilino Polje; Attendance: 15,292; Referee: Martin Atkinson (England)

7 October UEFA Euro 2012 qualifying Group D	Romania	2–2	Belarus	Bucharest, Romania
21:30 UTC+3	Mutu 19', 51' (pen.)	Report	Kornilenko 45'; Drahun 82'	Stadium: Stadionul Național; Attendance: 29,486; Referee: Alan Kelly (Republic of Ireland)

11 October International Friendly	Belarus	0–2	Poland	Wiesbaden, Germany
20:30 UTC+2		Report	Błaszczykowski 31'; Lewandowski 70'	Stadium: Brita-Arena; Attendance: 5,116; Referee: Peter Sippel (Germany)

15 November International Friendly	Belarus	1–1	Libya	Dubai, United Arab Emirates
19:30 UTC+4	Karnilenka 77'	Report	Saad 32'	Stadium: Police Officers Club Stadium; Attendance: 250; Referee: Mohammed Abdulla Hassan Mohamed (United Arab Emirates)

=== 2012 ===
29 February International Friendly	Belarus	0–0	Moldova	Aksu, Turkey
17:00 UTC+2		Report		Stadium: Mardan Sports Complex; Attendance: 100; Referee: Gediminas Mažeika (Lithuania)

7 June International Friendly	Belarus	1–1	Lithuania	Minsk, Belarus
19:00 UTC+3	Drahun 79'	Report	Radavičius 43'	Stadium: Dinamo Stadium; Attendance: 2,000; Referee: Igor Satschi (Moldova)

15 August International Friendly	Armenia	1–2	Belarus	Yerevan, Armenia
20:00 UTC+4	Verkhawtsow 73' (o.g.)	Report	Bressan 44', 66'	Stadium: Vazgen Sargsyan Republican Stadium; Attendance: 6,500; Referee: Davit Kharitonashvili (Georgia)

7 September 2014 FIFA World Cup qualifying Group I	Georgia	1–0	Belarus	Tbilisi, Georgia
21:00 UTC+4	Okriashvili 52'	Report		Stadium: Dinamo Arena; Attendance: 20,000; Referee: Stanislav Todorov (Bulgaria)

11 September 2014 FIFA World Cup qualifying Group I	France	3–1	Belarus	Saint-Denis, France
21:00 UTC+2	Capoue 49'; Jallet 68'; Ribéry 80'	Report	Putsila 72'	Stadium: Stade de France; Attendance: 52,552; Referee: Hüseyin Göçek (Turkey)

12 October 2014 FIFA World Cup qualifying Group I	Belarus	0–4	Spain	Minsk, Belarus
21:00 UTC+3		Report	Alba 12'; Pedro 21', 69', 79'	Stadium: Dinamo Stadium; Attendance: 28,800; Referee: Serge Gumienny (Belgium)

16 October 2014 FIFA World Cup qualifying Group I	Belarus	2–0	Georgia	Minsk, Belarus
19:00 UTC+3	Bressan 6'; Drahun 28'	Report		Stadium: Dinamo Stadium; Attendance: 15,300; Referee: Robert Schörgenhofer (Austria)

14 November International Friendly	Israel	1–2	Belarus	Jerusalem, Israel
20:30 UTC+2	Damari 19'	Report	Kislyak 45'; Balanovich 46'	Stadium: Teddy Stadium; Attendance: 8,000; Referee: Simon Lee Evans (Wales)

=== 2013 ===
6 February International Friendly	Belarus	1–1	Hungary	Belek, Turkey
18:00 UTC+2	Valadzko 58'	Report	Szabics 32'	Stadium: İberostar Bellis Hotel Futbol Sahası; Attendance: 200; Referee: Bülent Yıldırım (Turkey)

21 March International Friendly	Jordan	1–0	Belarus	Amman, Jordan
17:00 UTC+3	Deeb 31'	Report		Stadium: King Abdullah Stadium; Attendance: 1,200; Referee: Khamis Al Marri (Qatar)

25 March International Friendly	Belarus	2–0	Canada	Doha, Qatar
18:00 UTC+3	Rodionov 29'; Khvashchynski 87'	Report		Stadium: Aspire Academy for Sports Excellence; Attendance: 100; Referee: Abdullah Balideh (Qatar)

3 June International Friendly	Estonia	0–2	Belarus	Tallinn, Estonia
20:00 UTC+3		Report	Anton Putsila 32'; Rodionov 80'	Stadium: A. Le Coq Arena; Attendance: 3,192; Referee: Jakob Kehlet (Denmark)

7 June 2014 FIFA World Cup qualifying Group I	Finland	1–0	Belarus	Helsinki, Finland
19:00 UTC+3	Shitov 57' (o.g.)	Report		Stadium: Olympiastadion; Attendance: 24,916; Referee: Eli Hacmon (Israel)

11 June 2014 FIFA World Cup qualifying Group I	Belarus	1–1	Finland	Gomel, Belarus
20:00 UTC+3	Verkhovtsov 85'	Report	Pukki 22'	Stadium: Central Stadium; Attendance: 10,100; Referee: Libor Kovařík (Czech Republic)

14 August International Friendly	Belarus	1–1	Montenegro	Zhodzina, Belarus
18:30 UTC+3	Kornilenko 16' (pen.)	Report	Vučinić 63'	Stadium: Torpedo Stadium; Attendance: 3,000; Referee: Kristo Tohver (Estonia)

6 September International Friendly	Belarus	3–1	Kyrgyzstan	Barysaw, Belarus
19:00 UTC+3	Balanovich 30'; Rodionov 38'; Sitko 67'	Report	Rustamov 56'	Stadium: City Stadium; Attendance: 5,000; Referee: Nerijus Dunauskas (Lithuania)

10 September 2014 FIFA World Cup qualifying Group I	Belarus	2–4	France	Gomel, Belarus
22:00 UTC+3	Filipenko 32'; Kalachev 57'	Report	Ribéry 47' (pen.), 64'; Nasri 71'; Pogba 73'	Stadium: Central Stadium; Attendance: 12,203; Referee: Daniele Orsato (Italy)

11 October 2014 FIFA World Cup qualifying Group I	Spain	2–1	Belarus	Palma, Spain
22:00 UTC+2	Xavi 61'; Negredo 78'	Report	Kornilenko 89'	Stadium: Iberostar; Attendance: 23,142; Referee: Bas Nijhuis (Netherlands)

15 October International Friendly	Belarus	1–0	Japan	Zhodzina, Belarus
15:15 UTC+3	Tsiharaw 44'	Report		Stadium: Tarpeda Stadium; Attendance: 3,250; Referee: Sergejus Slyva (Lithuania)

15 November International Friendly	Belarus	0–0	Albania	Antalya, Turkey
18:00 UTC+2		Report		Stadium: Akdeniz University Stadium; Attendance: 50; Referee: Fırat Aydınus (Turkey)

19 November International Friendly	Turkey	2–1	Belarus	Mersin, Turkey
20:00 UTC+2	Bulut 4'; Yılmaz 89'	Report	Rodionov 10'	Stadium: Tevfik Sırrı Gür Stadium; Attendance: 18,000; Referee: Antonio Mateu Lahoz (Spain)

=== 2014 ===
5 March International Friendly	Bulgaria	2–1	Belarus	Sofia, Bulgaria
17:45 (UTC+2)	Milanov 14'; Gadzhev 66'	Report	Kryvets 86'	Stadium: Vasil Levski National Stadium; Attendance: 500; Referee: Milenko Vukadinović (Serbia)

18 May International Friendly	Iran	0–0	Belarus	Kapfenberg, Austria
14:00 UTC+2		Report		Stadium: Franz Fekete Stadium; Attendance: 700; Referee: Markus Hameter (Austria)

21 May International Friendly	Liechtenstein	1–5	Belarus	Vaduz, Liechtenstein
19:00 UTC+2	Burgmeier 78'	Report	Gordeichuk 13'; Kislyak 15'; Krivets 23'; Savitski 58', 67'	Stadium: Rheinpark Stadion; Attendance: 750; Referee: Laurent Kopriwa (Luxembourg)

4 September International Friendly	Belarus	6–1	Tajikistan	Barysaw, Belarus
19:00 UTC+3	Stasevich 7'; Karnilenka 55'; Kryvets 59'; Alyakhnovich 61'; Kislyak 63'; Aleksiyevich 75'	Report	Fatkhuloev 34'	Stadium: Borisov Arena; Attendance: 2,400; Referee: Sergejus Slyva (Lithuania)

8 September UEFA Euro 2016 qualifying Group C	Luxembourg	1–1	Belarus	Luxembourg City, Luxembourg
20:45 UTC+2	Gerson 42'	Report	Drahun 78'	Stadium: Stade Josy Barthel; Attendance: 3,265; Referee: Gediminas Mažeika (Lithuania)

9 October UEFA Euro 2016 qualifying Group C	Belarus	0–2	Ukraine	Barysaw, Belarus
21:45 UTC+3		Report	Martynovich 82' (o.g.); Sydorchuk 90+3'	Stadium: Borisov Arena; Attendance: 10,512; Referee: Pol van Boekel (Netherlands)

12 October UEFA Euro 2016 qualifying Group C	Belarus	1–3	Slovakia	Barysaw, Belarus
21:45 UTC+3	Kalachev 79'	Report	Hamšík 65', 84'; Šesták 90+1'	Stadium: Borisov Arena; Attendance: 3,684; Referee: Serge Gumienny (Belgium)

15 November UEFA Euro 2016 qualifying Group C	Spain	3–0	Belarus	Huelva, Spain
20:45 UTC+1	Isco 18'; Busquets 19'; Pedro 55'	Report		Stadium: Nuevo Colombino; Attendance: 19,249; Referee: Kenn Hansen (Denmark)

18 November International Friendly	Belarus	3–2	Mexico	Barysaw, Belarus
20:00 (UTC+3)	Kislyak 50'; Signevich 55'; Nyakhaychyk 81'	Report	R. Jiménez 48', 53'	Stadium: Borisov Arena; Attendance: 6,700; Referee: Ivanov Sergey (Russia)

=== 2015 ===
27 March UEFA Euro 2016 qualifying Group C	Macedonia	1–2	Belarus	Skopje, Macedonia
20:45 UTC+1	Trajkovski 9'	Report	Kalachev 44'; Kornilenko 82'	Stadium: Philip II Arena; Attendance: 3,447; Referee: Anthony Taylor (England)

30 March International Friendly	Belarus	0–0	Gabon	Belek, Turkey
15:00 UTC+3		Report		Stadium: İberostar Bellis Hotel Futbol Sahası; Attendance: 100; Referee: Abdulah Mohammad (Syria)

7 June International Friendly	Russia	4–2	Belarus	Khimki, Russia
18:00 UTC+3	Kokorin 20'; Golovin 77'; Miranchuk 83'; Kerzhakov 90+1'	Report	Kislyak 51', 66'	Stadium: Arena Khimki; Attendance: 4,500; Referee: Ivan Kružliak (Slovakia)

14 June UEFA Euro 2016 qualifying Group C	Belarus	0–1	Spain	Barysaw, Belarus
21:45 UTC+3		Report	Silva 45'	Stadium: Borisov Arena; Attendance: 13,121; Referee: Robert Schörgenhofer (Austria)

5 September UEFA Euro 2016 qualifying Group C	Ukraine	3–1	Belarus	Lviv, Ukraine
19:00 UTC+3	Kravets 7'; Yarmolenko 30'; Konoplyanka 40' (pen.)	Report	Kornilenko 62' (pen.)	Stadium: Arena Lviv; Attendance: 32,648; Referee: Liran Liany (Israel)

8 September UEFA Euro 2016 qualifying Group C	Belarus	2–0	Luxembourg	Barysaw, Belarus
21:45 UTC+3	Gordeichuk 34', 62'	Report		Stadium: Borisov Arena; Attendance: 3,482; Referee: Slavko Vinčić (Slovenia)

9 October UEFA Euro 2016 qualifying Group C	Slovakia	0–1	Belarus	Žilina, Slovakia
20:45 UTC+2		Report	Drahun 34'	Stadium: Štadión pod Dubňom; Attendance: 9,859; Referee: Hüseyin Göçek (Turkey)

12 October UEFA Euro 2016 qualifying Group C	Belarus	0–0	Macedonia	Barysaw, Belarus
21:45 UTC+3		Report		Stadium: Borisov Arena; Attendance: 1,545; Referee: Christian Dingert (Germany)

=== 2016 ===
25 March International Friendly	Armenia	0–0	Belarus	Yerevan, Armenia
19:00 UTC+4		Report		Stadium: Vazgen Sargsyan Republican Stadium; Attendance: 4,500; Referee: George Vadachkoria (Georgia)

29 March International Friendly	Montenegro	0–0	Belarus	Podgorica, Montenegro
18:00 UTC+2		Report		Stadium: Stadion pod Goricom; Attendance: 5,500; Referee: Danilo Grujić (Serbia)

27 May International Friendly	Northern Ireland	3–0	Belarus	Belfast, Northern Ireland
19:45 UTC+1	Lafferty 6'; Washington 44'; Grigg 88'	Report		Stadium: Windsor Park; Attendance: 14,229; Referee: Martin Atkinson (England)

31 May International Friendly	Republic of Ireland	1–2	Belarus	Cork, Republic of Ireland
19:45 UTC+1	Ward 72'	Report	Hardzeichuk 20'; Valadzko 63'	Stadium: Turners Cross; Attendance: 7,200; Referee: Dejan Jakimovski (Macedonia)

31 August International Friendly	Norway	0–1	Belarus	Oslo, Norway
19:30 UTC+2		Report	Kryvets 57'	Stadium: Ullevaal Stadion; Attendance: 7,180; Referee: Jacob Bille (Denmark)

6 September 2018 FIFA World Cup qualifying Group A	Belarus	0–0	France	Barysaw, Belarus
21:45 UTC+3		Report		Stadium: Borisov Arena; Attendance: 12,920; Referee: Ovidiu Hațegan (Romania)

7 October 2018 FIFA World Cup qualifying Group A	Netherlands	4–1	Belarus	Rotterdam, Netherlands
20:45 UTC+2	Promes 15', 31'; Klaassen 56'; Janssen 64'	Report	Rios 47'	Stadium: De Kuip; Attendance: 41,200; Referee: Craig Thomson (Scotland)

10 October 2018 FIFA World Cup qualifying Group A	Belarus	1–1	Luxembourg	Barysaw, Belarus
21:45 UTC+3	Savitski 80'	Report	Joachim 85'	Stadium: Borisov Arena; Attendance: 9,011; Referee: Tobias Welz (Germany)

9 November International Friendly	Greece	0–1	Belarus	Piraeus, Greece
21:15 UTC+2		Report	Palitsevich 14'	Stadium: Karaiskakis Stadium; Attendance: 3,108; Referee: Craig Pawson (England)

13 November 2018 FIFA World Cup qualifying Group A	Bulgaria	1–0	Belarus	Sofia, Bulgaria
19:00 UTC+2	I. Popov 10'	Report		Stadium: Vasil Levski National Stadium; Attendance: 1,994; Referee: Stephan Klossner (Switzerland)

=== 2017 ===
25 March 2018 FIFA World Cup qualifying Group A	Sweden	4–0	Belarus	Solna, Sweden
18:00 UTC+1	Forsberg 19' (pen.), 49'; Berg 57'; Kiese Thelin 77'	Report		Stadium: Friends Arena; Attendance: 31,243; Referee: Harald Lechner (Austria)

28 March International Friendly	Macedonia	3–0	Belarus	Skopje, Macedonia
18:00 UTC+2	Spirovski 40'; Pandev 61', 69'	Report		Stadium: Philip II Arena; Attendance: 3,000; Referee: Pavle Radovanović (Montenegro)

1 June International Friendly	Switzerland	1–0	Belarus	Neuchâtel, Switzerland
20:45 UTC+2	Shaqiri 9'	Report		Stadium: Stade de la Maladière; Attendance: 10,200; Referee: Radek Příhoda (Czech Republic)

9 June 2018 FIFA World Cup qualifying Group A	Belarus	2–1	Bulgaria	Barysaw, Belarus
21:45 UTC+3	Sivakow 33' (pen.); Savitski 80'	Report	Kostadinov 90+1'	Stadium: Borisov Arena; Attendance: 6,150; Referee: Matej Jug (Slovenia)

12 June International Friendly	Belarus	1–0	New Zealand	Minsk, Belarus
19:00 UTC+3	Palyakow 47'	Report		Stadium: Traktor Stadium; Referee: Mikhail Vilkov (Russia)

31 August 2018 FIFA World Cup qualifying Group A	Luxembourg	1–0	Belarus	Luxembourg City, Luxembourg
20:45 UTC+2	Da Mota 60'	Report		Stadium: Stade Josy Barthel; Attendance: 2,752; Referee: Clayton Pisani (Malta)

3 September 2018 FIFA World Cup qualifying Group A	Belarus	0–4	Sweden	Barysaw, Belarus
19:00 UTC+3		Report	Forsberg 18'; Nyman 24'; Berg 37'; Granqvist 84' (pen.)	Stadium: Borisov Arena; Attendance: 6,431; Referee: Tobias Stieler (Germany)

7 October 2018 FIFA World Cup qualifying Group A	Belarus	1–3	Netherlands	Barysaw, Belarus
21:45 UTC+3	Valadzko 55'	Report	Pröpper 25'; Robben 84' (pen.); Depay 90+3'	Stadium: Borisov Arena; Attendance: 6,850; Referee: Michael Oliver (England)

10 October 2018 FIFA World Cup qualifying Group A	France	2–1	Belarus	Saint-Denis, France
20:45 UTC+2	Griezmann 27'; Giroud 33'	Report	Saroka 44'	Stadium: Stade de France; Attendance: 74,037; Referee: Halis Özkahya (Turkey)

9 November International Friendly	Armenia	4–1	Belarus	Yerevan, Armenia
18:00 UTC+4	Özbiliz 41'; Mkhitaryan 45'; Hovsepyan 55'; Vardanyan 84'	Report	Saroka 58' (pen.)	Stadium: Vazgen Sargsyan Republican Stadium; Attendance: 1,500; Referee: Lasha Silagava (Georgia)

13 November International Friendly	Georgia	2–2	Belarus	Kutaisi, Georgia
18:00 UTC+4	Sikharulidze 35'; Dvali 51'	Report	Stasevich 24'; Nyakhaychyk 66'	Stadium: Ramaz Shengelia Stadium; Attendance: 7,500; Referee: Suren Baliyan (Armenia)

=== 2018 ===
23 March International Friendly	Azerbaijan	0–1	Belarus	Baku, Azerbaijan
20:00 UTC+4		Report	Medvedev 41' (o.g.)	Stadium: Baku Olympic Stadium; Attendance: 5,500; Referee: Andris Treimanis (Latvia)

27 March International Friendly	Slovenia	0–2	Belarus	Ljubljana, Slovenia
20:15 UTC+1		Report	Skavysh 36'; Saroka 90+4'	Stadium: Stožice Stadium; Attendance: 4,000; Referee: Fran Jović (Croatia)

6 June International Friendly	Belarus	1–1	Hungary	Brest, Belarus
20:00 UTC+3	Saroka 26'	Report	Varga 29'	Stadium: Regional Sport Complex Brestsky; Attendance: 8,400; Referee: Sergey Lapochkin (Russia)

9 June International Friendly	Finland	2–0	Belarus	Tampere, Finland
19:00 UTC+3	Uronen 75'; Yaghoubi 75'	Report		Stadium: Tampere Stadium; Attendance: 4,520; Referee: Alain Durieux (Luxembourg)

8 September 2018–19 UEFA Nations League D	Belarus	5–0	San Marino	Minsk, Belarus
19:00	Stasevich 4'; Drahun 26', 87'; Saroka 67' (pen.); Kavalyow 90+1'	Report		Stadium: Dinamo Stadium; Attendance: 13,634; Referee: Sandro Schärer (Switzerland)

11 September 2018–19 UEFA Nations League D	Moldova	0–0	Belarus	Chișinău, Moldova
21:45		Report		Stadium: Zimbru Stadium; Attendance: 4,942; Referee: Mario Zebec (Croatia)

12 October 2018–19 UEFA Nations League D	Belarus	1–0	Luxembourg	Minsk, Belarus
21:45	Saroka 43'	Report		Stadium: Dinamo Stadium; Attendance: 14,122; Referee: Ali Palabıyık (Turkey)

15 October 2018–19 UEFA Nations League D	Belarus	0–0	Moldova	Minsk, Belarus
21:45		Report		Stadium: Dinamo Stadium; Attendance: 10,870; Referee: Kevin Clancy (Scotland)

15 November 2018–19 UEFA Nations League D	Luxembourg	0–2	Belarus	Luxembourg City, Luxembourg
20:45		Report	Drahun 37', 54'	Stadium: Stade Josy Barthel; Attendance: 4,533; Referee: Serdar Gözübüyük (Netherlands)

18 November 2018–19 UEFA Nations League D	San Marino	0–2	Belarus	Serravalle, San Marino
18:00		Report	Drahun 8'; Saroka 52'	Stadium: San Marino Stadium; Attendance: 736; Referee: Giorgi Kruashvili (Georgia)

=== 2019 ===
21 March UEFA Euro 2020 qualifying Group C	Netherlands	4–0	Belarus	Rotterdam, Netherlands
20:45 UTC+1	Depay 1', 55' (pen.); Wijnaldum 21'; Van Dijk 86'	Report		Stadium: De Kuip; Attendance: 38,604; Referee: Davide Massa (Italy)

24 March UEFA Euro 2020 qualifying Group C	Northern Ireland	2–1	Belarus	Belfast, Northern Ireland
19:45 UTC+0	J. Evans 30'; Magennis 87'	Report	Stasevich 33'	Stadium: Windsor Park; Attendance: 18,188; Referee: Paweł Raczkowski (Poland)

8 June UEFA Euro 2020 qualifying Group C	Belarus	0–2	Germany	Barysaw, Belarus
21:45 UTC+3		Report	Sané 13'; Reus 62'	Stadium: Borisov Arena; Attendance: 12,510; Referee: Srđan Jovanović (Serbia)

11 June UEFA Euro 2020 qualifying Group C	Belarus	0–1	Northern Ireland	Barysaw, Belarus
21:45 UTC+3		Report	McNair 86'	Stadium: Borisov Arena; Attendance: 5,250; Referee: Harald Lechner (Austria)

6 September UEFA Euro 2020 qualifying Group C	Estonia	1–2	Belarus	Tallinn, Estonia
18:00 UTC+3	Sorga 54'	Report	Naumov 48'; Skavysh 90+2'	Stadium: A. Le Coq Arena; Attendance: 7,314; Referee: Alain Durieux (Luxembourg)

9 September International Friendly	Wales	1–0	Belarus	Cardiff, Wales
20:45 UTC+1	James 17'	Report		Stadium: Cardiff City Stadium; Referee: Willie Collum (Scotland)

10 October UEFA Euro 2020 qualifying Group C	Belarus	0–0	Estonia	Minsk, Belarus
18:00 UTC+3		Report		Stadium: Dinamo Stadium; Referee: Ricardo de Burgos Bengoetxea (Spain)

13 October UEFA Euro 2020 qualifying Group C	Belarus	1–2	Netherlands	Minsk, Belarus
18:00 UTC+3	Drahun 53'	Report	Wijnaldum 32', 41'	Stadium: Dinamo Stadium; Referee: Anastasios Sidiropoulos (Greece)

16 November UEFA Euro 2020 qualifying Group C	Germany	4–0	Belarus	Mönchengladbach, Germany
20:45 UTC+1	Ginter 41'; Goretzka 49'; Kroos 55', 83'	Report		Stadium: Borussia-Park; Referee: Orel Grinfeld (Israel)

19 November International Friendly	Montenegro	2–0	Belarus	Podgorica, Montenegro
18:00 UTC+1	Mugoša 9'; Hakšabanović 14'	Report		Stadium: Podgorica City Stadium; Referee: Trustin Farrugia Cann (Malta)

=== 2020 ===
23 February International Friendly	Uzbekistan	0–1	Belarus	Al Hamriyah, United Arab Emirates
15:00 UTC+4		Report	Nyakhaychyk 26'	Stadium: Al Hamriya Sports Club Stadium; Attendance: 50; Referee: Omar Mohamed Al-Ali (United Arab Emirates)

26 February International Friendly	Bulgaria	0–1	Belarus	Sofia, Bulgaria
		Report	Padstrelaw 15'	Stadium: Vasil Levski National Stadium; Attendance: 250; Referee: Trustin Farrugia Cann (Malta)

4 September 2020–21 UEFA Nations League C	Belarus	0–2	Albania	Minsk, Belarus
21:45 UTC+3		Report	Cikalleshi 23'; Bare 78'	Stadium: Dinamo Stadium; Attendance: 0 (Note: Due to the COVID-19 pandemic in Europe, all matches scheduled for September 2020 were played behind closed doors.); Referee: Kristoffer Karlsson (Sweden)

7 September 2020–21 UEFA Nations League C	Kazakhstan	1–2	Belarus	Almaty, Kazakhstan
20:00 UTC+6	Aimbetov 62'	Report	Bardachow 53'; Lisakovich 86'	Stadium: Almaty Central Stadium; Attendance: 0 Referee: Giorgi Kruashvili (Georgia)

8 October 2020–21 UEFA Nations League C	Georgia	1–0	Belarus	Tbilisi, Georgia
21:00 UTC+4	Okriashvili 7' (pen.)	Report		Stadium: Boris Paichadze Dinamo Arena; Attendance: 0 (Note: The Georgia v Belarus match was played behind closed doors due to the COVID-19 pandemic in Georgia.); Referee: Cüneyt Çakır (Turkey)

11 October 2020–21 UEFA Nations League C	Lithuania	2–2	Belarus	Vilnius, Lithuania
19:00 UTC+3	Novikovas 7'; Laukžemis 75'	Report	Lisakovich 59' (pen.); Sachywka 66'	Stadium: LFF Stadium; Attendance: 963; Referee: Julian Weinberger (Austria)

14 October 2020–21 UEFA Nations League C	Belarus	2–0	Kazakhstan	Minsk, Belarus
21:45 UTC+3	Yablonskiy 36'; Yuzepchuk 90+3'	Report		Stadium: Dinamo Stadium; Attendance: 2,074; Referee: Aleksandar Stavrev (North Macedonia)

11 November International Friendly	Romania	5–3	Belarus	Ploiești, Romania
19:00 UTC+2	Mitrea 11'; Marin 20' (pen.); Nedelcearu 31', 55'; Pușcaș 44'	Report	Kendysh 63'; Bakhar 80'; Klimovich 90+2'	Stadium: Ilie Oană Stadium; Attendance: 0 Referee: Georgi Kabakov (Bulgaria)

15 November 2020–21 UEFA Nations League C	Belarus	2–0	Lithuania	Minsk, Belarus
21:00 UTC+3	Yablonskiy 5'; Ebong 20'	Report		Stadium: Dinamo Stadium; Attendance: 1,985; Referee: Chris Kavanagh (England)

18 November 2020–21 UEFA Nations League C	Albania	3–2	Belarus	Tirana, Albania
15:00 UTC+1	Cikalleshi 20', 27' (pen.); Manaj 44'	Report	Skavysh 35'; Ebong 80'	Stadium: Arena Kombëtare; Attendance: 0 Referee: Radu Petrescu (Romania)

=== 2021 ===
24 March International Friendly	Belarus	1–1	Honduras	Zhodzina, Belarus
13:00	Savitski 22'	Report	López 45'	Stadium: Torpedo Stadium; Attendance: 500; Referee: Aleksei Matyunin (Russia)

27 March 2022 FIFA World Cup qualifying Group E	Belarus	4–2	Estonia	Minsk, Belarus
18:00	Lisakovich 45' (pen.), 84'; Kendysh 64'; Savitski 81'	Report (FIFA); Report (UEFA)	Anier 31', 55'	Stadium: Dinamo Stadium; Attendance: 3,611; Referee: Robert Hennessy (Ireland)

30 March 2022 FIFA World Cup qualifying Group E	Belgium	8–0	Belarus	Leuven, Belgium
20:45	Batshuayi 14'; Vanaken 17', 89'; Trossard 38', 75'; Doku 42'; Praet 49'; Benteke 70'	Report (FIFA); Report (UEFA)		Stadium: Den Dreef; Attendance: 0 Referee: Donatas Rumšas (Lithuania)

2 June International Friendly	Belarus	1–2	Azerbaijan	Minsk, Belarus
19:00	Skavysh 56'	Report	B. Huseynov 73'; Sheydayev 90+1'	Stadium: Dinamo National Olympic Stadium; Attendance: 4,120; Referee: Dumitru Muntean (Moldova)

2 September 2022 FIFA World Cup qualifying Group E	Czech Republic	1–0	Belarus	Ostrava, Czech Republic
20:45	Barák 34'	Report (FIFA); Report (UEFA)		Stadium: Městský stadion v Ostravě-Vítkovicích; Attendance: 7,218; Referee: Srđan Jovanović (Serbia)

5 September 2022 FIFA World Cup qualifying Group E	Belarus	2–3	Wales	Kazan, Russia
15:00	V. Lisakovich 29' (pen.); Sedko 31'	Report (FIFA); Report (UEFA)	Bale 6' (pen.), 69' (pen.), 90+3'	Stadium: Central Stadium; Attendance: 0 Referee: Giorgi Kruashvili (Georgia)

8 September 2022 FIFA World Cup qualifying Group E	Belarus	0–1	Belgium	Kazan, Russia
20:45		Report (FIFA); Report (UEFA)	Praet 33'	Stadium: Central Stadium; Attendance: 0 Referee: Paweł Raczkowski (Poland)

8 October 2022 FIFA World Cup qualifying Group E	Estonia	2–0	Belarus	Tallinn, Estonia
20:45	Sorga 58'; Zenjov 90+3'	Report (FIFA); Report (UEFA)		Stadium: A. Le Coq Arena; Attendance: 3,597; Referee: Mohammed Al-Hakim (Sweden)

11 October 2022 FIFA World Cup qualifying Group E	Belarus	0–2	Czech Republic	Kazan, Russia
20:45		Report (FIFA); Report (UEFA)	Schick 22'; Hložek 65'	Stadium: Central Stadium; Attendance: 0 Referee: François Letexier (France)

13 November 2022 FIFA World Cup qualifying Group E	Wales	5–1	Belarus	Cardiff, Wales
21:45	Ramsey 3', 50' (pen.); N. Williams 20'; B. Davies 77'; C. Roberts 89'	Report (FIFA); Report (UEFA)	Kontsevoy 87'	Stadium: Cardiff City Stadium; Attendance: 27,152; Referee: Maurizio Mariani (Italy)

16 November International Friendly	Belarus	1–0	Jordan	Minsk, Belarus
19:00 UTC+3	Yablonsky 20'	Report		Stadium: Dinamo Stadium; Attendance: 1,120; Referee: Zaven Hovhannisyan (Armenia)

=== 2022 ===
26 March International Friendly	India	0–3	Belarus	Isa Town, Bahrain
19:00 UTC+3		Report	Bykov 48'; Solovey 68'; Gromyko 90+1'	Stadium: Khalifa Sports City Stadium; Attendance: 920; Referee: Ismaeel Habib Ali (Bahrain)

29 March International Friendly	Bahrain	0–1	Belarus	Muharraq, Bahrain
20:00 UTC+3		Report	Solovey 45+1'	Stadium: Al Muharraq Stadium; Referee: Majed Al-Shamrani (Saudi Arabia)

3 June 2022–23 UEFA Nations League C	Belarus	0–1	Slovakia	Novi Sad, Serbia (Note: Due to the Belarusian involvement in the Russian invasion of Ukraine, Belarus are required to play their home matches at neutral venues and behind closed doors until further notice.)
20:45		Report	Suslov 61'	Stadium: Karađorđe Stadium; Attendance: 0 Referee: Stéphanie Frappart (France)

6 June 2022–23 UEFA Nations League C	Belarus	0–0	Azerbaijan	Novi Sad, Serbia
20:45 UTC+2		Report		Stadium: Karađorđe Stadium; Attendance: 0 Referee: Mohammed Al-Hakim (Sweden)

10 June 2022–23 UEFA Nations League C	Belarus	1–1	Kazakhstan	Novi Sad, Serbia
20:45 UTC+2	Malkevich 84'	Report	Aymbetov 13'	Stadium: Karađorđe Stadium; Attendance: 0 Referee: Manuel Schüttengruber (Austria)

13 June 2022–23 UEFA Nations League C	Azerbaijan	2–0	Belarus	Baku, Azerbaijan
20:00 UTC+4	Emreli 76'; Sheydayev 90+3'	Report		Stadium: Dalga Arena; Attendance: 2,330; Referee: Anastasios Papapetrou (Greece)

22 September 2022–23 UEFA Nations League C	Kazakhstan	2–1	Belarus	Nur-Sultan, Kazakhstan
20:00 UTC+6	Gabyshev 18'; Zaynutdinov 79'	Report	Savitsky 45+3'	Stadium: Astana Arena; Attendance: 29,637; Referee: Horatiu Fesnic (Romania)

25 September 2022–23 UEFA Nations League C	Slovakia	1–1	Belarus	Bačka Topola, Serbia (Note: Due to the country's involvement in the Russian invasion of Ukraine, Belarus were not allowed to enter Slovakia by local authorities. As a result, the match was played at a neutral venue.)
19:00	Zreľák 65'	Report	Bakhar 45'	Stadium: TSC Arena; Attendance: 524; Referee: Nikola Dabanović (Montenegro)

17 November International Friendly	Syria	0–1	Belarus	Dubai, United Arab Emirates
20:00 UTC+4		Report	Krouma 81' (o.g.)	Stadium: Al Maktoum Stadium; Attendance: 710; Referee: Yahya Al Mulla (United Arab Emirates)

20 November International Friendly	Oman	2–0	Belarus	Al Ain, United Arab Emirates
18:00 UTC+4	Al-Yahyaei 78'; Al-Subhi 81'	Report		Stadium: Hazza bin Zayed Stadium; Attendance: 150; Referee: Adel Al-Naqbi (United Arab Emirates)

=== 2023 ===
25 March UEFA Euro 2024 qualifying Group I	Belarus	0–5	Switzerland	Novi Sad, Serbia
18:00		Report	Steffen 4', 17', 29'; Xhaka 62'; Amdouni 65'	Stadium: Karađorđe Stadium; Attendance: 0 Referee: Alejandro Hernández Hernández (Spain)

28 March UEFA Euro 2024 qualifying Group I	Romania	2–1	Belarus	Bucharest, Romania
21:45 UTC+3	Stanciu 17'; Burcă 19'	Report	Morozov 86'	Stadium: Arena Națională; Attendance: 27,837; Referee: Allard Lindhout (Netherlands)

16 June UEFA Euro 2024 qualifying Group I	Belarus	1–2	Israel	Budapest, Hungary
20:45	Ebong 16'	Report	Weissman 85' (pen.); Gloukh 90+2'	Stadium: Szusza Ferenc Stadion; Attendance: 0 Referee: Jarred Gillett (Australia)

19 June UEFA Euro 2024 qualifying Group I	Belarus	2–1	Kosovo	Budapest, Hungary
20:45	Morozov 73'; Ebong 75'	Report	Muriqi 87' (pen.)	Stadium: Szusza Ferenc Stadion; Attendance: 0 Referee: Julian Weinberger (Austria)

9 September UEFA Euro 2024 qualifying Group I	Andorra	0–0	Belarus	Andorra la Vella, Andorra
18:00 UTC+2		Report		Stadium: Estadi Nacional; Attendance: 1,026; Referee: Eldorjan Hamiti (Albania)

12 September UEFA Euro 2024 qualifying Group I	Israel	1–0	Belarus	Tel Aviv, Israel
21:45 UTC+3	Kanichowsky 90+3'	Report		Stadium: Bloomfield Stadium; Attendance: 28,435; Referee: Ricardo de Burgos Bengoetxea (Spain)

12 October UEFA Euro 2024 qualifying Group I	Belarus	0–0	Romania	Budapest, Hungary
20:45		Report		Stadium: Szusza Ferenc Stadion; Attendance: 0 Referee: Espen Eskås (Norway)

15 October UEFA Euro 2024 qualifying Group I	Switzerland	3–3	Belarus	St. Gallen, Switzerland
18:00 UTC+2	Shaqiri 28'; Akanji 89'; Amdouni 90'	Report	Ebong 61'; Polyakov 69'; Antilevski 84'	Stadium: Kybunpark; Attendance: 17,000; Referee: João Pinheiro (Portugal)

18 November UEFA Euro 2024 qualifying Group I	Belarus	1–0	Andorra	Budapest, Hungary
18:00	Laptev 83'	Report		Stadium: Szusza Ferenc Stadion; Attendance: 0 Referee: Bulat Sariyev (Kazakhstan)

21 November UEFA Euro 2024 qualifying Group I	Kosovo	0–1	Belarus	Pristina, Kosovo
20:45 UTC+2		Report	Antilevsky 43'	Stadium: Fadil Vokrri Stadium; Attendance: 5,026; Referee: Georgi Kabakov (Bulgaria)

=== 2024 ===
21 March International Friendly	Montenegro	2–0	Belarus	Antalya, Turkey
20:00 UTC+3	Marušić 27'; Krstović 45'	Report		Stadium: Mardan Sports Complex; Attendance: 100; Referee: Kadir Sağlam (Turkey)

26 March International Friendly	Malta	0–0	Belarus	Ta' Qali, Malta
19:00 UTC+1		Report		Stadium: National Stadium; Attendance: 2,129; Referee: Martin Dohál (Slovakia)

7 June International Friendly	Belarus	0–4	Russia	Minsk, Belarus
20:00		Report	Oblyakov 8'; Tyukavin 20'; Chalov 63', 69'	Stadium: Dinamo Stadium; Attendance: 21,483; Referee: Rustam Omarov (Kazakhstan)

11 June International Friendly	Belarus	0–4	Israel	Budapest, Hungary (Note: Due to the Belarusian involvement in the Russian invasion of Ukraine and Gaza war, Belarus and Israel are required to play their home matches at neutral venues and behind closed doors until further notice.)
18:00 UTC+2		Report	Melamed 7'; Safouri 18'; Shlomo 36'; Kna'an 82'	Stadium: Szusza Ferenc Stadion; Attendance: 0 Referee: Tamás Bognár (Hungary)

5 September 2024–25 UEFA Nations League C	Belarus	0–0	Bulgaria	Zalaegerszeg, Hungary
20:45		Report		Stadium: ZTE Arena; Attendance: 0 Referee: Ovidiu Hațegan (Romania)

8 September 2024–25 UEFA Nations League C	Luxembourg	0–1	Belarus	Luxembourg City, Luxembourg
15:00		Report	Gromyko 76'	Stadium: Stade de Luxembourg; Attendance: 6,820; Referee: Lawrence Visser (Belgium)

12 October 2024–25 UEFA Nations League C	Belarus	0–0	Northern Ireland	Zalaegerszeg, Hungary
20:45		Report		Stadium: ZTE Arena; Attendance: 0 Referee: Henrik Nalbandyan (Armenia)

15 October 2024–25 UEFA Nations League C	Belarus	1–1	Luxembourg	Zalaegerszeg, Hungary
20:45	Politevich 54'	Report	Rodrigues 78' (pen.)	Stadium: ZTE Arena; Attendance: 0 Referee: Atilla Karaoğlan (Turkey)

15 November 2024–25 UEFA Nations League C	Northern Ireland	2–0	Belarus	Belfast, Northern Ireland
19:45	Ballard 50'; D. Charles 63' (pen.)	Report		Stadium: Windsor Park; Attendance: 18,044; Referee: Luis Godinho (Portugal)

18 November 2024–25 UEFA Nations League C	Bulgaria	1–1	Belarus	Plovdiv, Bulgaria
21:45	Panayotov 12'	Report	Kavalyow 70'	Stadium: Hristo Botev Stadium; Attendance: 2,200; Referee: Allard Lindhout (Netherlands)

=== 2025 ===
20 March International Friendly	Tajikistan	0–5	Belarus	Dushanbe, Tajikistan
16:00 UTC+5		Report	Lisakovich 64', 87'; Melnichenko 73'; Yablonsky 85'; Kontsevoy 90+2'	Stadium: Pamir Stadium; Attendance: 6,300; Referee: Rustam Lutfullin (Uzbekistan)

25 March International Friendly	Azerbaijan	0–2	Belarus	Masazir, Azerbaijan
21:45 UTC+4		Report	Zabelin 59'; Demchenko 78'	Stadium: Bank Respublika Arena; Attendance: 2,452; Referee: Aleko Aptsiauri (Georgia)

5 June International Friendly	Belarus	4–1	Kazakhstan	Barysaw, Belarus
20:00 UTC+3	Gromyko 25'; Bocherov 31'; Melnichenko 50'; Shikavka 85'	Report	Kenzhebek 74'	Stadium: Borisov Arena; Attendance: 4,443; Referee: Sergei Karasev (Russia)

10 June International Friendly	Belarus	1–4	Russia	Minsk, Belarus
20:00 UTC+3	Pigas 54'	Report	Gladyshev 21', 24', 33', 52'	Stadium: National Football Stadium; Attendance: 27,314; Referee: Sayat Karabayev (Kazakhstan)

5 September 2026 FIFA World Cup qualifying Group C	Greece	5–1	Belarus	Piraeus, Greece
21:45	Karetsas 3'; Pavlidis 17'; Bakasetas 21'; Kourbelis 36'; Tzolis 63'	Report	Barkouski 72' (pen.)	Stadium: Karaiskakis Stadium; Attendance: 14,936; Referee: Jarred Gillett (England / Australia)

8 September 2026 FIFA World Cup qualifying Group C	Belarus	0–2	Scotland	Zalaegerszeg, Hungary
20:45		Report	Adams 43'; Volkov 65' (o.g.)	Stadium: ZTE Arena; Attendance: 0 Referee: Nikola Dabanović (Montenegro)

9 October 2026 FIFA World Cup qualifying Group C	Belarus	0–6	Denmark	Zalaegerszeg, Hungary
20:45		Report	Froholdt 14'; Højlund 19', 45'; Dorgu 45+6'; Dreyer 66', 78'	Stadium: ZTE Arena; Attendance: 0 Referee: Filip Glova (Slovakia)

12 October 2026 FIFA World Cup qualifying Group C	Scotland	2–1	Belarus	Glasgow, Scotland
20:45	Adams 15'; McTominay 84'	Report	Kuchko 90+6'	Stadium: Hampden Park; Attendance: 49,346; Referee: Marian Barbu (Romania)

15 November 2026 FIFA World Cup qualifying Group C	Denmark	2–2	Belarus	Copenhagen, Denmark
20:45	Damsgaard 11'; Isaksen 79'	Report	Hramyka 62'; Dziemchanka 65'	Stadium: Parken Stadium; Attendance: 35,493; Referee: Sven Jablonski (Germany)

18 November 2026 FIFA World Cup qualifying Group C	Belarus	0–0	Greece	Zalaegerszeg, Hungary
20:45		Report		Stadium: ZTE Arena; Attendance: 0 Referee: Damian Sylwestrzak (Poland)

=== 2026 ===
26 March International Friendly	Cyprus	0–1	Belarus	Nicosia, Cyprus
19:00 (UTC+2)		Report	Tikhomirov 25'	Stadium: GSP Stadium; Attendance: 500; Referee: Miloš Milanović (Serbia)

29 March International Friendly	Armenia	1–2	Belarus	Yerevan, Armenia
18:00 (UTC+4)	Bichakhchyan 88' (pen.)	Report	Yablonsky 8'; Tiknizyan 72' (o.g.)	Stadium: Vazgen Sargsyan Republican Stadium; Attendance: 11,483; Referee: Dumitru Muntean (Moldova)

5 June International Friendly	Belarus	4–1	Syria	Minsk, Belarus
19:00 UTC+3	Morozov 3'; Kontsevoy 11'; Shumansky 48'; Yablonsly 78'	Report	Al-Mawas 88' (pen.)	Stadium: National Football Stadium; Attendance: 13,811; Referee: Aliyar Aghayev (Azerbaijan)

9 June International Friendly	Belarus	2–2	Burkina Faso	Minsk, Belarus
19:30 UTC+3	Malkevich 56'; Vardanyan 67'	Report	Kaboré 72'; Tapsoba 85'	Stadium: National Football Stadium; Attendance: 15,874; Referee: Rafael Shafeev (Russia)

26 September 2026–27 UEFA Nations League C	Albania	2–0	Belarus	Tirana, Albania
20:45	Asllani 34' (pen.); Muçi 45+2'	Report		Stadium: Arena Kombëtare; Attendance: 18,150; Referee: Sam Barrott (England)

29 September 2026–27 UEFA Nations League C	Finland	0–0	Belarus	Helsinki, Finland
20:45		Report		Stadium: Helsinki Olympic Stadium; Attendance: 7,262; Referee: Nikola Dabanović (Montenegro)

3 October 2026–27 UEFA Nations League C	Belarus	4–0	San Marino	Budapest, Hungary
18:00	Kontsevoy 46', 88'; Shumansky 65'; Ebong 68'	Report		Stadium: Illovszky Rudolf Stadion; Attendance: 0 Referee: Alexandros Tsakalidis (Greece)

6 October 2026–27 UEFA Nations League C	Belarus	1–0	Finland	Budapest, Hungary
20:45	Shumansky 1'	Report		Stadium: Illovszky Rudolf Stadion; Attendance: 0 Referee: Sascha Stegemann (Germany)

12 November 2026–27 UEFA Nations League C	San Marino	0–2	Belarus	Serravalle, San Marino
20:45		Report	Gomanov 13'; Kontsevoy 17'	Stadium: San Marino Stadium; Attendance: 365; Referee: Goga Kikacheishvili (Georgia)

15 November 2026–27 UEFA Nations League C	Belarus	0–2	Albania	Budapest, Hungary
18:00		Report	Manaj 28'; Hysaj 57'	Stadium: Illovszky Rudolf Stadion; Attendance: 0 Referee: Igor Pajač (Croatia)
