= Scotland national football team results (2020–present) =

- Win Draw Loss

This article lists the results for the Scotland national football team from 2020 to present.

== Key ==
Key to matches

- Att. = Match attendance
- (H) = Home ground
- (A) = Away ground
- (N) = Neutral ground

Key to record by opponent

- Pld = Games played
- W = Games won
- D = Games drawn
- L = Games lost
- GF = Goals for
- GA = Goals against

== Results and scheduled fixtures ==
Scotland's score is shown first in each case.

Match number	Date	Venue	Opponents	Score	Competition	Scotland scorers	Att.	Ref.
784	4 September 2020	Hampden Park, Glasgow (H)	Israel	1–1	2020–21 Nations League	Ryan Christie	0	
785	7 September 2020	Andrův stadion, Olomouc (A)	Czech Republic	2–1	2020–21 Nations League	Lyndon Dykes, Ryan Christie	0	
786	8 October 2020	Hampden Park, Glasgow (H)	Israel	0–0	Euro 2020 qualifying play-offs (Note: Scotland won 5–3 in a penalty shootout.)	—	0	
787	11 October 2020	Hampden Park, Glasgow (H)	Slovakia	1–0	2020–21 Nations League	Lyndon Dykes	0	
788	14 October 2020	Hampden Park, Glasgow (H)	Czech Republic	1–0	2020–21 Nations League	Ryan Fraser	0	
789	12 November 2020	Red Star Stadium, Belgrade (A)	Serbia	1–1	Euro 2020 qualifying play-offs (Note: Scotland won 5–4 in a penalty shootout.)	Ryan Christie	0	
790	15 November 2020	Anton Malatinský Stadium, Trnava (A)	Slovakia	0–1	2020–21 Nations League	—	0	
791	18 November 2020	Netanya Stadium, Netanya (A)	Israel	0–1	2020–21 Nations League	—	0	
792	25 March 2021	Hampden Park, Glasgow (H)	Austria	2–2	2022 World Cup qualification	Grant Hanley, John McGinn	0	
793	28 March 2021	Bloomfield Stadium, Tel Aviv (A)	Israel	1–1	2022 World Cup qualification	Ryan Fraser	5,000	
794	31 March 2021	Hampden Park, Glasgow (H)	Faroe Islands	4–0	2022 World Cup qualification	John McGinn (2), Ché Adams, Ryan Fraser	0	
795	2 June 2021	Estádio Algarve, Faro/Loulé (N)	Netherlands	2–2	Friendly	Jack Hendry, Kevin Nisbet	0	
796	6 June 2021	Stade Josy Barthel, Luxembourg (A)	Luxembourg	1–0	Friendly	Ché Adams	1,000	
797	14 June 2021	Hampden Park, Glasgow (H)	Czech Republic	0–2	Euro 2020	—	9,847	
798	18 June 2021	Wembley Stadium, London (A)	England	0–0	Euro 2020	—	20,306	
799	22 June 2021	Hampden Park, Glasgow (H)	Croatia	1–3	Euro 2020	Callum McGregor	9,896	
800	1 September 2021	Parken Stadium, Copenhagen (A)	Denmark	0–2	2022 World Cup qualification	—	34,562	
801	4 September 2021	Hampden Park, Glasgow (H)	Moldova	1–0	2022 World Cup qualification	Lyndon Dykes	40,869	
802	7 September 2021	Ernst-Happel-Stadion, Vienna (A)	Austria	1–0	2022 World Cup qualification	Lyndon Dykes	18,800	
803	9 October 2021	Hampden Park, Glasgow (H)	Israel	3–2	2022 World Cup qualification	John McGinn, Lyndon Dykes, Scott McTominay	50,585	
804	12 October 2021	Tórsvøllur, Tórshavn (A)	Faroe Islands	1–0	2022 World Cup qualification	Lyndon Dykes	4,233	
805	12 November 2021	Zimbru Stadium, Chișinău (A)	Moldova	2–0	2022 World Cup qualification	Nathan Patterson, Ché Adams	3,642	
806	15 November 2021	Hampden Park, Glasgow (H)	Denmark	2–0	2022 World Cup qualification	John Souttar, Ché Adams	49,527	
807	24 March 2022	Hampden Park, Glasgow (H)	Poland	1–1	Friendly	Kieran Tierney	39,090	
808	29 March 2022	Ernst-Happel-Stadion, Vienna (A)	Austria	2–2	Friendly	Jack Hendry, John McGinn	6,600	
809	1 June 2022	Hampden Park, Glasgow (H)	Ukraine	1–3	2022 World Cup qualification play-offs	Callum McGregor	49,772	
810	8 June 2022	Hampden Park, Glasgow (H)	Armenia	2–0	2022–23 Nations League	Anthony Ralston, Scott McKenna	38,627	
811	11 June 2022	Aviva Stadium, Dublin (A)	Republic of Ireland	0–3	2022–23 Nations League	—	46,927	
812	14 June 2022	Republican Stadium, Yerevan (A)	Armenia	4–1	2022–23 Nations League	Stuart Armstrong (2), John McGinn, Ché Adams	13,500	
813	21 September 2022	Hampden Park, Glasgow (H)	Ukraine	3–0	2022–23 Nations League	John McGinn, Lyndon Dykes (2)	42,846	
814	24 September 2022	Hampden Park, Glasgow (H)	Republic of Ireland	2–1	2022–23 Nations League	Jack Hendry, Ryan Christie	48,853	
815	27 September 2022	Józef Piłsudski's Cracovia Stadium, Kraków (N)	Ukraine	0–0	2022–23 Nations League	—	13,534	
816	16 November 2022	Diyarbakır Stadium, Diyarbakır (A)	Turkey	1–2	Friendly	John McGinn	28,348	
817	25 March 2023	Hampden Park, Glasgow (H)	Cyprus	3–0	Euro 2024 qualifying	John McGinn, Scott McTominay (2)	48,195	
818	28 March 2023	Hampden Park, Glasgow (H)	Spain	2–0	Euro 2024 qualifying	Scott McTominay (2)	47,976	
819	17 June 2023	Ullevaal Stadion, Oslo (A)	Norway	2–1	Euro 2024 qualifying	Lyndon Dykes, Kenny McLean	25,791	
820	20 June 2023	Hampden Park, Glasgow (H)	Georgia	2–0	Euro 2024 qualifying	Callum McGregor, Scott McTominay	50,062	
821	8 September 2023	AEK Arena, Larnaca (A)	Cyprus	3–0	Euro 2024 qualifying	Scott McTominay, Ryan Porteous, John McGinn	6,633	
822	12 September 2023	Hampden Park, Glasgow (H)	England	1–3	Friendly	Own goal	49,129	
823	12 October 2023	Estadio de La Cartuja, Seville (A)	Spain	0–2	Euro 2024 qualifying	—	45,623	
824	17 October 2023	Stade Pierre-Mauroy, Lille (A)	France	1–4	Friendly	Billy Gilmour	44,000	
825	16 November 2023	Boris Paichadze Dinamo Arena, Tbilisi (A)	Georgia	2–2	Euro 2024 qualifying	Scott McTominay, Lawrence Shankland	44,595	
826	19 November 2023	Hampden Park, Glasgow (H)	Norway	3–3	Euro 2024 qualifying	John McGinn, Own goal, Stuart Armstrong	48,138	
827	22 March 2024	Johan Cruyff Arena, Amsterdam (A)	Netherlands	0–4	Friendly	—	46,223	
828	26 March 2024	Hampden Park, Glasgow (H)	Northern Ireland	0–1	Friendly	—	33,452	
829	3 June 2024	Estadio Algarve, Faro/Loulé (N)	Gibraltar	2–0	Friendly	Ryan Christie, Ché Adams	1,329	
830	7 June 2024	Hampden Park, Glasgow (H)	Finland	2–2	Friendly	Own goal, Lawrence Shankland	40,519	
831	14 June 2024	Allianz Arena, Munich (A)	Germany	1–5	Euro 2024	Own goal	65,052	
832	19 June 2024	RheinEnergieStadion, Cologne (N)	Switzerland	1–1	Euro 2024	Scott McTominay	42,711	
833	23 June 2024	MHPArena, Stuttgart (N)	Hungary	0–1	Euro 2024	—	54,000	
834	5 September 2024	Hampden Park, Glasgow (H)	Poland	2–3	2024–25 Nations League	Billy Gilmour, Scott McTominay	46,356	
835	8 September 2024	Estádio da Luz, Lisbon (A)	Portugal	1–2	2024–25 Nations League	Scott McTominay	59,894	
836	12 October 2024	Stadion Maksimir, Zagreb (A)	Croatia	1–2	2024–25 Nations League	Ryan Christie	21,702	
837	15 October 2024	Hampden Park, Glasgow (H)	Portugal	0–0	2024–25 Nations League	—	49,056	
838	15 November 2024	Hampden Park, Glasgow (H)	Croatia	1–0	2024–25 Nations League	John McGinn	48,810	
839	18 November 2024	Stadion Narodowy, Warsaw (A)	Poland	2–1	2024–25 Nations League	John McGinn, Andy Robertson	55,433	
840	20 March 2025	Karaiskakis Stadium, Piraeus (A)	Greece	1–0	2024–25 Nations League play-offs	Scott McTominay	31,483	
841	23 March 2025	Hampden Park, Glasgow (H)	Greece	0–3	2024–25 Nations League play-offs	—	48,626	
842	6 June 2025	Hampden Park, Glasgow (H)	Iceland	1–3	Friendly	John Souttar	32,797	
843	9 June 2025	Rheinpark Stadion, Vaduz (A)	Liechtenstein	4–0	Friendly	Ché Adams (3), George Hirst	4,036	
844	5 September 2025	Parken Stadium, Copenhagen (A)	Denmark	0–0	2026 World Cup qualification	—	35,369	
845	8 September 2025	ZTE Arena, Zalaegerszeg (N)	Belarus	2–0	2026 World Cup qualification	Ché Adams, Own goal	0	
846	9 October 2025	Hampden Park, Glasgow (H)	Greece	3–1	2026 World Cup qualification	Ryan Christie, Lewis Ferguson, Lyndon Dykes	46,006	
847	12 October 2025	Hampden Park, Glasgow (H)	Belarus	2–1	2026 World Cup qualification	Ché Adams, Scott McTominay	49,346	
848	15 November 2025	Karaiskakis Stadium, Piraeus (A)	Greece	2–3	2026 World Cup qualification	Ben Gannon-Doak, Ryan Christie	18,405	
849	18 November 2025	Hampden Park, Glasgow (H)	Denmark	4–2	2026 World Cup qualification	Scott McTominay, Lawrence Shankland, Kieran Tierney, Kenny McLean	49,587	
850	28 March 2026	Hampden Park, Glasgow (H)	Japan	0–1	Friendly	—	44,644	
851	31 March 2026	Hill Dickinson Stadium, Liverpool (N)	Ivory Coast	0–1	Friendly	—	33,034	
852	30 May 2026	Hampden Park, Glasgow (H)	Curaçao	4–1	Friendly	Findlay Curtis, Lawrence Shankland (2), Ryan Christie	44,433	
853	6 June 2026	Sports Illustrated Stadium, Harrison, New Jersey (N)	Bolivia	4–0	Friendly	Lawrence Shankland, Scott McTominay, Ché Adams (2)	9,000	
854	13 June 2026	Gillette Stadium, Foxborough, Massachusetts (N)	Haiti	1–0	2026 FIFA World Cup Group C	John McGinn	64,146	
855	19 June 2026	Gillette Stadium, Foxborough, Massachusetts (N)	Morocco	0–1	2026 FIFA World Cup Group C	—	64,146	
856	24 June 2026	Hard Rock Stadium, Miami Gardens, Florida (N)	Brazil	0–3	2026 FIFA World Cup Group C	—	64,478	
857	26 September 2026	Stožice Stadium, Ljubljana (A)	Slovenia	0–0	2026–27 Nations League	—	12,182	
858	29 September 2026	Hampden Park, Glasgow (H)	Switzerland	0–3	2026–27 Nations League	—	41,028	
859	3 October 2026	Toše Proeski Arena, Skopje (A)	North Macedonia	2–0	2026–27 Nations League	Kieron Bowie, John McGinn	8,256	
860	6 October 2026	Hampden Park, Glasgow (H)	Slovenia	1–2	2026–27 Nations League	Ryan Christie	34,466	
861	13 November 2026	Hampden Park, Glasgow (H)	North Macedonia	2–1	2026–27 Nations League	John McGinn (2)	41,585	
862	16 November 2026	Sitterstadion, St Gallen (A)	Switzerland	0–4	2026–27 Nations League			

Notes

1. A: Match held behind closed doors due to the COVID-19 pandemic.
2. B: Attendance restricted due to the COVID-19 pandemic.
3. C: Due to the Belarusian involvement in the Russian invasion of Ukraine, Belarus are required to play their home matches at neutral venues and behind closed doors.

== Record by opponent ==
Team	Pld	W	D	L	GF	GA	GD	WPCT
Armenia	2	2	0	0	6	1	+5	100.00
Austria	3	1	2	0	5	4	+1	33.33
Belarus	2	2	0	0	4	1	+3	100.00
Bolivia	1	1	0	0	4	0	+4	100.00
Brazil	1	0	0	1	0	3	−3	0.00
Croatia	3	1	0	2	3	5	−2	33.33
Curaçao	1	1	0	0	4	1	+3	100.00
Cyprus	2	2	0	0	6	0	+6	100.00
Czech Republic	3	2	0	1	3	3	0	66.67
Denmark	4	2	1	1	6	4	+2	50.00
England	2	0	1	1	1	3	−2	0.00
Faroe Islands	2	2	0	0	5	0	+5	100.00
Finland	1	0	1	0	2	2	0	0.00
France	1	0	0	1	1	4	−3	0.00
Georgia	2	1	1	0	4	2	+2	50.00
Germany	1	0	0	1	1	5	−4	0.00
Gibraltar	1	1	0	0	2	0	+2	100.00
Greece	4	2	0	2	6	7	−1	50.00
Haiti	1	1	0	0	1	0	+1	100.00
Hungary	1	0	0	1	0	1	−1	0.00
Iceland	1	0	0	1	1	3	−2	0.00
Israel	5	1	3	1	5	5	0	20.00
Ivory Coast	1	0	0	1	0	1	−1	0.00
Japan	1	0	0	1	0	1	−1	0.00
Liechtenstein	1	1	0	0	4	0	+4	100.00
Luxembourg	1	1	0	0	1	0	+1	100.00
Morocco	1	0	0	1	0	1	−1	0.00
Moldova	2	2	0	0	3	0	+3	100.00
Netherlands	2	0	1	1	2	6	−4	0.00
North Macedonia	2	2	0	0	4	1	+3	100.00
Northern Ireland	1	0	0	1	0	1	−1	0.00
Norway	2	1	1	0	5	4	+1	50.00
Poland	3	1	1	1	5	5	0	33.33
Portugal	2	0	1	1	1	2	−1	0.00
Republic of Ireland	2	1	0	1	2	4	−2	50.00
Serbia	1	0	1	0	1	1	0	0.00
Slovakia	2	1	0	1	1	1	0	50.00
Slovenia	2	0	1	1	1	2	−1	0.00
Spain	2	1	0	1	2	2	0	50.00
Switzerland	3	0	1	2	1	8	−7	0.00
Turkey	1	0	0	1	1	2	−1	0.00
Ukraine	3	1	1	1	4	3	+1	33.33
Total	79	34	17	28	108	99	+9	43.04

Source: Results
