= Kieran Tierney =

Scottish footballer (born 1997)

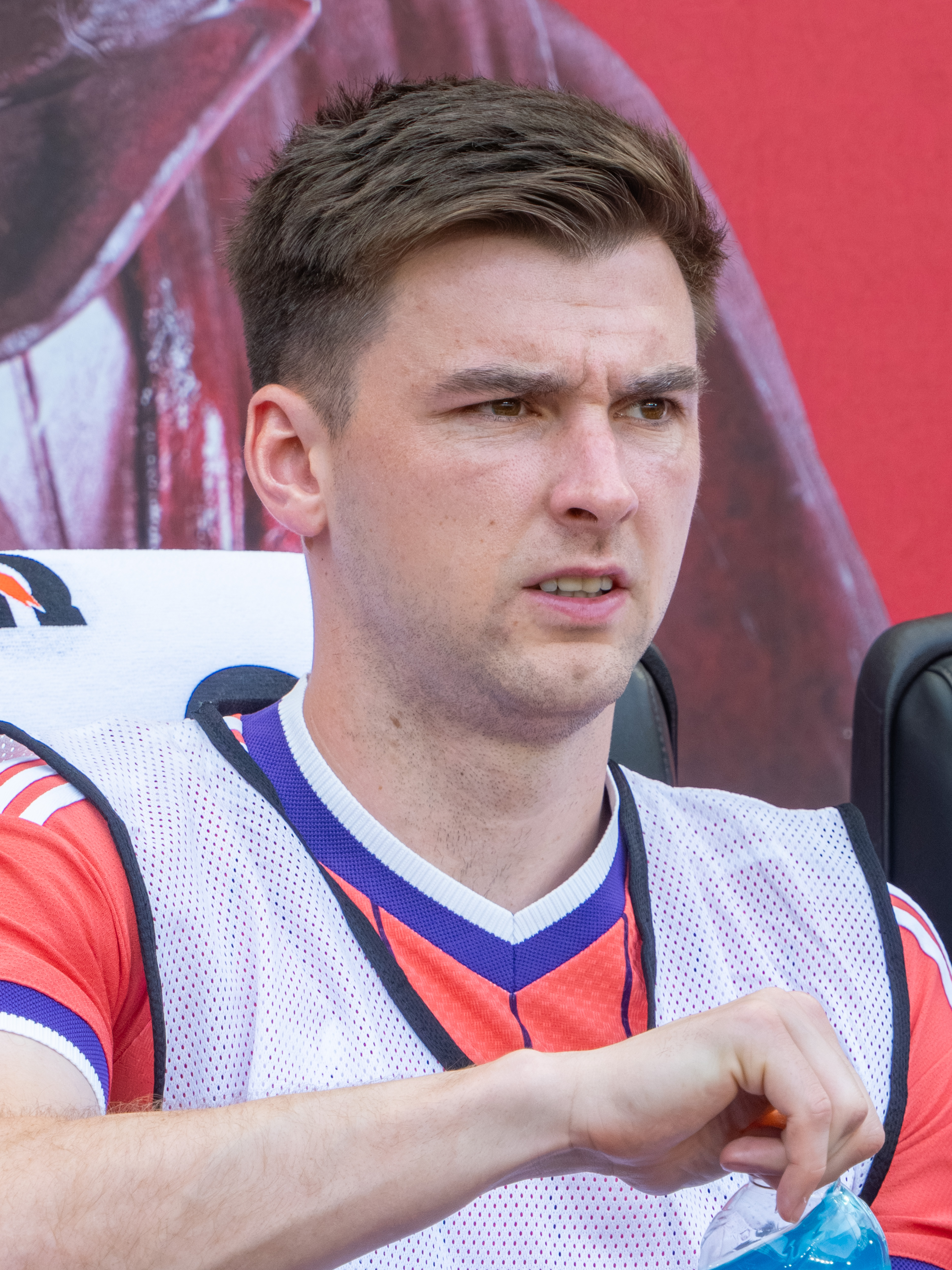
- Tierney in 2026

Personal information
- Full name: Kieran Tierney
- Date of birth: 5 June 1997 (age 29)
- Place of birth: Douglas, Isle of Man
- Height: 5 ft 10 in (1.78 m)
- Positions: Left-back; centre-back

Team information
- Current team: Celtic
- Number: 63

Youth career
- 2005–2015: Celtic

Senior career*
| Years | Team | Apps | (Gls) |
| 2015–2019 | Celtic | 102 | (5) |
| 2019–2025 | Arsenal | 104 | (4) |
| 2023–2024 | → Real Sociedad (loan) | 20 | (0) |
| 2025– | Celtic | 47 | (7) |

International career^{‡}
| 2014–2015 | Scotland U18 | 1 | (1) |
| 2015–2016 | Scotland U19 | 4 | (0) |
| 2016– | Scotland | 60 | (2) |
- * Club domestic league appearances and goals as of 20:23, 21 November 2026 (UTC) ‡ National team caps and goals as of 22:45, 16 November 2026 (UTC)

Kieran Tierney (born 5 June 1997) is a Scottish professional footballer who plays as a left-back for Scottish Premiership club Celtic and the Scotland national team.

Tierney came through the Celtic youth system and made his first-team debut in April 2015. After playing 170 games for the club, he joined Premier League side Arsenal in August 2019 for a fee reported at £25 million. After six years with Arsenal, including one on loan with La Liga club Real Sociedad, Tierney returned to Celtic in June 2025. He made his Scotland international debut in March 2016, and has since made more than 50 appearances for the senior side.

== Club career ==
=== Early life and youth football ===
Kieran Tierney was born on 5 June 1997 in Douglas on the Isle of Man, and moved to Wishaw in Scotland aged 10 months. He supported Celtic as a child and signed for the club when he was seven years old. He was educated at Motherwell schools St Brendan's RC Primary and Our Lady's High (one year group behind fellow footballers, twins Nicky and Chris Cadden) then attended St Ninian's High School, Kirkintilloch, which has a development partnership with Celtic. He has spoken of his hope of emulating the late Tommy Gemmell, a member of the Lisbon Lions team who also grew up in Wishaw (specifically, Craigneuk) and played in the same position.

Tierney progressed through the various youth ranks and earned a reputation as a dependable wide player in the club's development squad, both in defence and attack. He travelled with the first-team squad on a pre-season trip to Finland in August 2014, and made his debut in a friendly against Tottenham Hotspur there. Although Celtic lost, Tierney described his first appearance for the first team as a "dream come true". He continued to play in the development squad throughout 2014–15, and in October 2014 during a Development League match against Heart of Midlothian he scored a goal from the edge of his own penalty box.

=== Celtic ===
==== 2015–16: Debut and breakthrough ====
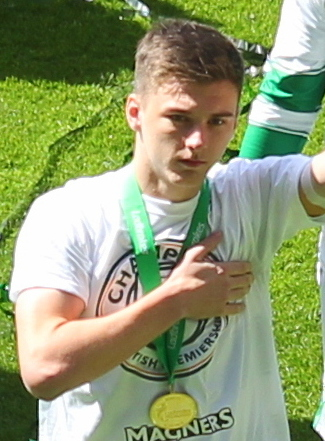
Tierney with Celtic in 2016

Tierney made his competitive senior debut for Celtic on 22 April 2015, coming on as an 81st-minute substitute in a Scottish Premiership match against Dundee. He made one further first-team appearance that season, playing over an hour in a league match away at St Johnstone.

Tierney enjoyed a breakthrough season in 2015–16, appearing in over 30 matches and displacing the more experienced Emilio Izaguirre as first-choice left back. For his performances he was awarded with both the Players' and Writers' Young Player annual awards, while Celtic also won the league title. Despite interest from Premier League clubs, Tierney signed a new five-year contract on 24 June 2016, keeping him at Parkhead until 2021. After making his first appearances in the group stage of the UEFA Champions League, Tierney suffered ankle ligament damage during training on 27 October 2016 and was initially ruled out of action for two months. During the layoff, which caused him to miss the League Cup final, he received treatment on a recurring shoulder injury and attended several Celtic matches as a typical supporter in the company of his childhood friends.

==== 2017–2019: Back-to-back domestic trebles ====
On 22 January 2017, after missing three months, he made his long-awaited return to the Celtic team in a Scottish Cup tie against Albion Rovers. Tierney was crowned PFA Scotland Young Player of the Year for the second consecutive season on 7 May, making him the first to achieve this since Craig Levein in 1986. He suffered a jaw injury early in the Scottish Cup final and had to be substituted for treatment. Celtic won the match 2–1 to complete a domestic treble and undefeated season. In spite of his lengthy injury absence, he featured in 40 matches during the campaign.

On 8 August 2017, Tierney was named as captain while also moving to central defender to command a back line of teenagers in a Scottish League Cup fixture against Kilmarnock; Celtic won the game 5–0, with Tierney providing an assist and scoring with a "wonderful strike" from 40 yards. On 30 October, a week after scoring in an important league victory away to closest challengers Aberdeen, he extended his contract with Celtic until 2023.

By the end of the season, he had collected further personal accolades—winning both the Players' and Writers' Young Player awards for the third campaign in succession—and performed a major role in securing a historic 'double treble' for the club, making more than 50 appearances and playing the entirety of the domestic cup finals, both being 2–0 wins over Motherwell. Tierney played in Celtic's victory over Aberdeen in the 2018 Scottish League Cup Final on 2 December 2018. Soon afterwards a hip injury meant that he was ruled out of action, returning on 24 February 2019. He then suffered from a hernia, which subsequently required surgery.

=== Arsenal ===
==== 2019–2023: FA Cup win and injuries ====
On 8 August 2019, Tierney signed for Premier League club Arsenal, for a reported £25 million fee. Tierney missed the early part of the 2019–20 season, having undergone a double hernia operation in May 2019. He made his first-team debut for Arsenal in a 5–0 win against Nottingham Forest in the EFL Cup on 24 September. Tierney assisted the first goal in a 4–0 home win against Standard Liège scored by Gabriel Martinelli a week later. He made his first appearance in the Premier League on 27 October, in a 2–2 draw with Crystal Palace. His season was further disrupted after suffering a dislocated shoulder in the game against West Ham United.

Tierney's impressive performances for Arsenal following the resumption of the Premier League after the COVID-19 pandemic saw him receive Arsenal's Player of the Month award for June. He scored his first goal for Arsenal on 26 July, in a 3–2 win against Watford on the final day of the 2019–20 Premier League season. On 1 August 2020, Tierney was selected to start in the FA Cup final against Chelsea, as Arsenal won their 14th FA Cup.

On 28 August 2020, Tierney was in the starting 11 in the 2020 FA Community Shield, which Arsenal clinched a 5–4 victory over Liverpool in the penalty shootout after the match was 1–1 after 90 minutes. On 2 January 2021, Tierney scored the opening goal in a 4–0 away league win over West Bromwich Albion and later assisted the final goal, scored by Alexandre Lacazette. His stunning strike was subsequently voted the January Goal of the Month on the Arsenal official website. On 25 February, he scored a goal in a 3–2 win over Benfica in the Europa League round of 32, making him the first Scotsman to score for Arsenal in a European competition since Willie Young in March 1980. In June 2021, he signed a long-term contract with Arsenal.

Tierney played regularly for Arsenal during the 2021–22 season until suffering a season-ending knee injury in March. Arsenal lost league games against Crystal Palace, Brighton, Tottenham and Newcastle following his injury, and they narrowly missed out on Champions League qualification. It was later revealed in the All or Nothing: Arsenal series that Tierney had hyper-extended the knee during a game in February, but aggravated it a month later while walking in the Arsenal training ground. He returned to action at the start of the 2022–23 season.

Arsenal signed Oleksandr Zinchenko from Manchester City during the summer of 2022, and during the 2022–23 season the Ukrainian played most Premier League minutes at left back ahead of Tierney. This led to speculation that Tierney would look to leave Arsenal during the summer of 2023.

==== 2023–2024: Loan to Real Sociedad ====
On 27 August 2023, Tierney joined La Liga club Real Sociedad on a season-long loan. He made his full debut in a 5–3 win over Granada, for which he was labelled 'exquisite' by Real Sociedad boss Imanol Alguacil. He followed this up with an impressive performance against Real Madrid on 17 September. His season was interrupted by two hamstring injuries, sustained in September and January.

==== Return from loan ====
Tierney returned to Arsenal over the summer after picking up a hamstring injury at Euro 2024. He made his long-awaited return to training on 21 November 2024. On 20 April 2025, he made his 100th Premier League appearance for the club, in a 4–0 win over Ipswich Town at Portman Road. On 25 May 2025, Tierney opened the scoring in a 2–1 win away to Southampton in his final game for the club, having made a total of 144 appearances in all competitions, scoring 6 goals.

=== Return to Celtic ===
Tierney's former club, Celtic, confirmed in February 2025 that they had reached a pre-contract agreement for him to return to the club on a permanent basis in the summer of that year. His departure from Arsenal was announced in June 2025, and he signed a five-year contract with Celtic later that month. On 3 August, he made his second debut for the club in a 1–0 win against St Mirren in the league. He scored the first goal of his second spell on 9 November; the second in Celtic's 4–0 win against Kilmarnock. On 1 March 2026, Tierney scored Celtic's first goal against their arch rivals Rangers, as the Hoops came from 2–0 down to draw 2–2 in the Scottish Premiership game at Ibrox.

== International career ==
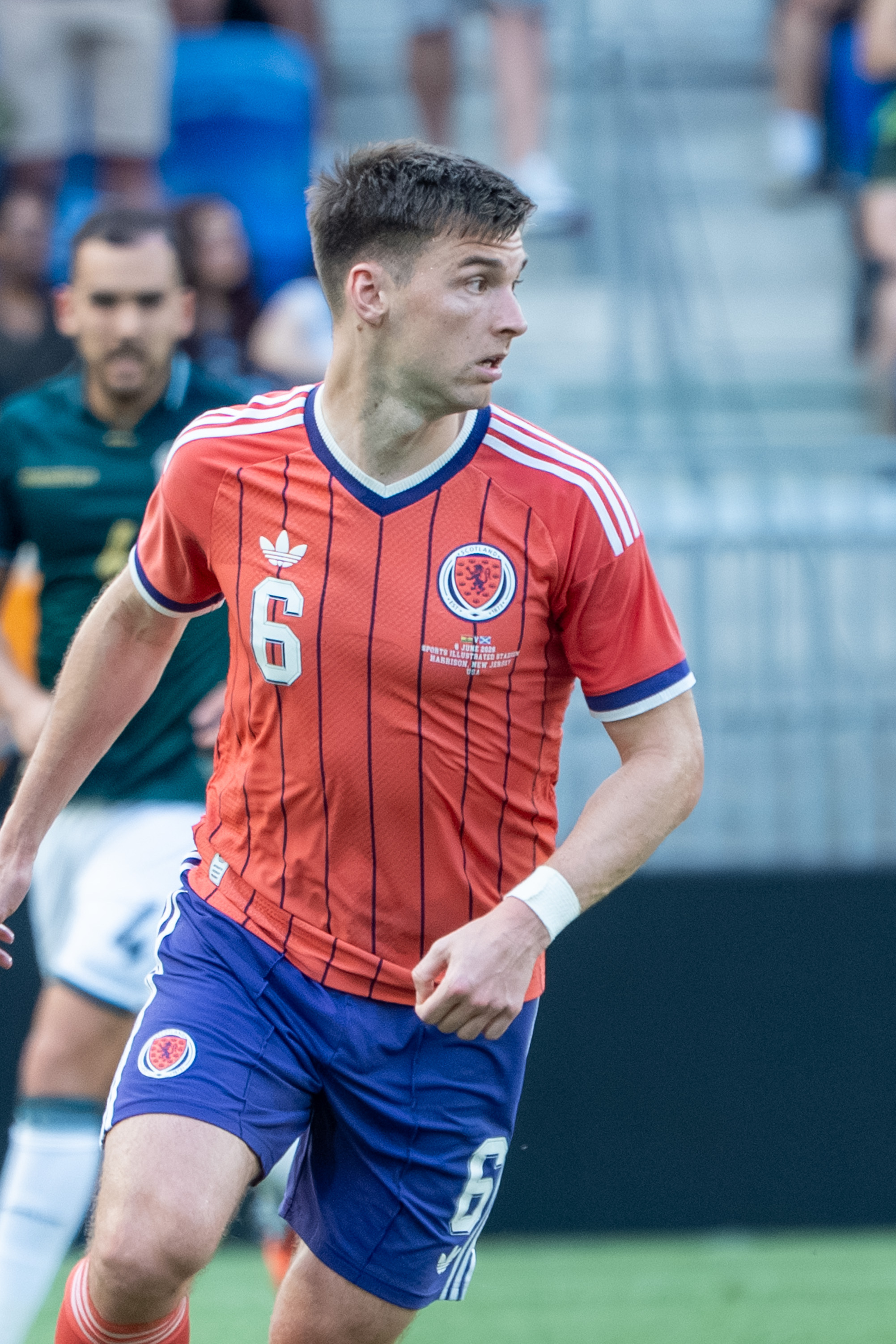
Tierney playing for Scotland in 2026

Tierney played for Scotland at Scotland U18 and Scotland U19 levels. He had also considered playing for the Ellan Vannin team that represents the Isle of Man when the ConIFA World Cup competition was being held. Tierney received his first call-up to the senior Scotland squad on 10 March 2016 for a friendly against Denmark. Tierney played for the first half of the match on 30 March, which Scotland won 1–0 at Hampden Park; he was replaced at the break by his Celtic teammate Charlie Mulgrew.

Due to his greater versatility compared to fellow left-back Andy Robertson, Tierney was deployed at right back in Scotland's matches against Slovenia, Lithuania and Slovakia, and on the left of a three-man defence in the fixture at home to England during World Cup qualifiers in 2017. Tierney was selected as Scotland captain for a friendly match against the Netherlands in November 2017, where he played as a central defender in a 1–0 defeat.

In October 2018, Tierney scored a decisive own goal in a 2–1 loss to Israel in a UEFA Nations League fixture. Speaking after the game, Robertson said that both he and Tierney were being played out of position in the 3–5–2 system adopted by Alex McLeish to accommodate both players. In November 2019, Tierney withdrew from the Scotland squad ahead of their UEFA Euro 2020 qualifiers against Cyprus and Kazakhstan due to a hip injury. In October 2020, he was required to pull out of the squad for a Euro 2020 play-off semi-final against Israel after being in close contact with Stuart Armstrong, who had tested positive for COVID-19. It was later confirmed by Armstrong, Tierney and Ryan Christie that they had been playing video games in the same room.

Tierney provided three assists in a 4–0 win against the Faroe Islands on 31 March 2021, despite playing from a central defensive position. He then played in two of Scotland's matches at the delayed UEFA Euro 2020 finals in June 2021, as he missed the opening match with Czech Republic due to injury. Tierney scored his first goal for Scotland on 24 March 2022, in a friendly against Poland at Hampden. Soon afterwards he suffered a training ground injury that kept him out of action for the rest of the 2021–22 season. This caused him to miss a World Cup playoff against Ukraine in June, which Scotland lost 3–1. Tierney appeared five times for Scotland during their successful UEFA Euro 2024 qualifying campaign, with the team winning all five of the matches he played and conceding only one goal.

On 7 June 2024, Tierney was named in Scotland's squad for the UEFA Euro 2024 finals in Germany. A week later, he started the opening match of the tournament, playing 76 minutes before being substituted for Scott McKenna, as Scotland lost 5–1 to hosts Germany. Tierney was substituted with an injury in the 61st minute of the second group match against Switzerland on 19 June. This injury made him unavailable for the final match against Hungary, which they lost 1–0 to finish bottom of Group A with one point from three matches. Tierney gained his 50th cap in a 3–1 defeat to Iceland on 6 June 2025. On 18 November 2025, he scored a stoppage-time goal in a 4–2 victory over Denmark in the last match of Group C, securing his nation's place in the 2026 FIFA World Cup for the first time since 1998.

On 19 May 2026, Tierney was selected in the 26-man squad for the 2026 FIFA World Cup. He made his World Cup debut on 19 June 2026, starting in a group stage match against Morocco.

== Personal life ==
Tierney became an ambassador for the Scottish Society for Prevention of Cruelty to Animals (SSPCA) in June 2021.

== Career statistics ==
=== Club ===
As of match played 21 November 2026

Appearances and goals by club, season and competition
| Club | Season | League | | | National cup (Note: Includes Scottish Cup, FA Cup, Copa del Rey) | | League cup (Note: Includes Scottish League Cup, EFL Cup) | | Europe | | Other | | Total | |
| Club | Season | Division | Apps | Goals | Apps | Goals | Apps | Goals | Apps | Goals | Apps | Goals | Apps | Goals |
|---|---|---|---|---|---|---|---|---|---|---|---|---|---|---|
| Celtic | 2014–15 | Scottish Premiership | 2 | 0 | 0 | 0 | 0 | 0 | 0 | 0 | – | | 2 | 0 |
| Celtic | 2015–16 | Scottish Premiership | 23 | 1 | 4 | 0 | 2 | 0 | 4 (Note: Appearances in UEFA Europa League) | 0 | – | | 33 | 1 |
| Celtic | 2016–17 | Scottish Premiership | 24 | 1 | 5 | 1 | 2 | 0 | 9 (Note: Appearances in UEFA Champions League) | 0 | – | | 40 | 2 |
| Celtic | 2017–18 | Scottish Premiership | 32 | 3 | 5 | 0 | 4 | 1 | 14 (Note: Twelve appearances in UEFA Champions League, two appearances in UEFA Europa League) | 0 | – | | 55 | 4 |
| Celtic | 2018–19 | Scottish Premiership | 21 | 0 | 2 | 0 | 3 | 0 | 14 (Note: Six appearances in UEFA Champions League, eight appearances and one goal in UEFA Europa League) | 1 | – | | 40 | 1 |
| Celtic | Total | | 102 | 5 | 16 | 1 | 11 | 1 | 41 | 1 | — | | 170 | 8 |
| Arsenal | 2019–20 | Premier League | 15 | 1 | 3 | 0 | 2 | 0 | 4 | 0 | — | | 24 | 1 |
| Arsenal | 2020–21 | Premier League | 27 | 1 | 1 | 0 | 0 | 0 | 9 | 1 | 1 (Note: Appearance in FA Community Shield) | 0 | 38 | 2 |
| Arsenal | 2021–22 | Premier League | 22 | 1 | 1 | 0 | 2 | 0 | — | | — | | 25 | 1 |
| Arsenal | 2022–23 | Premier League | 27 | 0 | 2 | 0 | 1 | 0 | 6 | 1 | — | | 36 | 1 |
| Arsenal | 2023–24 | Premier League | 0 | 0 | — | | — | | — | | 1 | 0 | 1 | 0 |
| Arsenal | 2024–25 | Premier League | 13 | 1 | 1 | 0 | 1 | 0 | 5 | 0 | — | | 20 | 1 |
| Arsenal | Total | | 104 | 4 | 8 | 0 | 6 | 0 | 24 | 2 | 2 | 0 | 144 | 6 |
| Real Sociedad (loan) | 2023–24 | La Liga | 20 | 0 | 4 | 0 | — | | 2 | 0 | — | | 26 | 0 |
| Celtic | 2025–26 | Scottish Premiership | 35 | 6 | 3 | 0 | 4 | 0 | 11 (Note: Two appearances in UEFA Champions League, nine appearances in UEFA Europa League) | 0 | — | | 53 | 6 |
| Celtic | 2026–27 | Scottish Premiership | 12 | 1 | 0 | 0 | 1 | 0 | 6 (Note: Two appearances in UEFA Champions League, four appearances in UEFA Europa League) | 0 | — | | 19 | 1 |
| Celtic | Total | | 47 | 7 | 3 | 0 | 5 | 0 | 17 | 0 | — | | 72 | 7 |
| Career total | | | 273 | 16 | 31 | 1 | 22 | 1 | 84 | 3 | 2 | 0 | 412 | 21 |

=== International ===
As of match played 16 November 2026

Appearances and goals by national team and year
| National team | Year | Apps | Goals |
|---|---|---|---|
| Scotland | 2016 | 2 | 0 |
| Scotland | 2017 | 7 | 0 |
| Scotland | 2018 | 3 | 0 |
| Scotland | 2020 | 4 | 0 |
| Scotland | 2021 | 14 | 0 |
| Scotland | 2022 | 5 | 1 |
| Scotland | 2023 | 6 | 0 |
| Scotland | 2024 | 6 | 0 |
| Scotland | 2025 | 6 | 1 |
| Scotland | 2026 | 7 | 0 |
| Total | | 60 | 2 |

As of match played 18 November 2025
Scotland score listed first, score column indicates score after each Tierney goal.

List of international goals scored by Kieran Tierney
| No. | Date | Venue | Cap | Opponent | Score | Result | Competition |
|---|---|---|---|---|---|---|---|
| 1 | 24 March 2022 | Hampden Park, Glasgow, Scotland | 31 | Poland | 1–0 | 1–1 | Friendly |
| 2 | 18 November 2025 | Hampden Park, Glasgow, Scotland | 53 | Denmark | 3–2 | 4–2 | 2026 FIFA World Cup qualification |

== Honours ==
Celtic

- Scottish Premiership: 2015–16, 2016–17, 2017–18, 2018–19, 2025–26
- Scottish Cup: 2016–17, 2017–18, 2025–26
- Scottish League Cup: 2017–18, 2018–19

Arsenal

- FA Cup: 2019–20
- FA Community Shield: 2020, 2023

Individual

- UEFA Champions League Breakthrough XI: 2017
- PFA Scotland Young Player of the Year: 2015–16, 2016–17, 2017–18
- SFWA Young Player of the Year: 2015–16, 2016–17, 2017–18
- Celtic Young Player of the Year: 2015–16, 2016–17, 2017–18
- SFSA Supporters' Player of the Year: 2017
- Scottish Premiership Player of the Month: October 2017
- PFA Scotland Team of the Year (Premiership): 2015–16, 2016–17 2017–18
- PFA Scotland Goal of the Season: 2017–18
- Celtic FC Goal of the Season: 2017–18

== See also ==
- List of Scotland international footballers born outside Scotland
- List of Scotland national football team captains
