= 2026 FIFA World Cup qualification – UEFA Group C =

Association football tournament group

The 2026 FIFA World Cup qualification UEFA Group C was one of the twelve UEFA groups in the World Cup qualification tournament that decided which teams would qualify for the 2026 FIFA World Cup final tournament in Canada, Mexico and the United States. Group C consisted of four teams: Belarus, Denmark, Greece and Scotland. The teams played against each other home-and-away in a round-robin format from September to November 2025.

The group winners, Scotland, qualified directly for the World Cup finals, while the runners-up, Denmark, advanced to the second round (play-offs).

== Standings ==
Pos	Team	Pld	W	D	L	GF	GA	GD	Pts	Qualification	(Scotland national football team)	(Denmark national football team)	(Greece national football team)	(Belarus national football team)
1	Scotland	6	4	1	1	13	7	+6	13	Qualification for 2026 FIFA World Cup	—	4–2	3–1	2–1
2	Denmark	6	3	2	1	16	7	+9	11	Advance to play-offs	0–0	—	3–1	2–2
3	Greece	6	2	1	3	10	12	−2	7		3–2	0–3	—	5–1
4	Belarus	6	0	2	4	4	17	−13	2		0–2	0–6	0–0	—

Source: FIFA, UEFA
Rules for classification: Tiebreakers

== Matches ==
The fixture list was confirmed by UEFA on 13 December 2024 following the draw. Times are CET/CEST, (Note: CEST (UTC+2) for matches until 26 October 2025 (matchdays 1–4), and CET (UTC+1) for matches thereafter (matchdays 5–6).) as listed by UEFA (local times, if different, are in parentheses).

5 September 2025
20:45 (21:45 UTC+3)

Greece	5–1	Belarus
Karetsas 3'; Pavlidis 17'; Bakasetas 21'; Kourbelis 36'; Tzolis 63'	Report (FIFA); Report (UEFA)	Barkovsky 72' (pen.)

Karaiskakis Stadium, Piraeus
Attendance: 14,936
Referee: Jarred Gillett (England)
5 September 2025
20:45

Denmark	0–0	Scotland
	Report (FIFA); Report (UEFA)

Parken Stadium, Copenhagen
Attendance: 35,369
Referee: Daniel Siebert (Germany)

8 September 2025
20:45

Belarus	0–2	Scotland
	Report (FIFA); Report (UEFA)	Adams 43'; Volkov 65' (o.g.)

ZTE Arena, Zalaegerszeg (Hungary) (Note: Due to Belarusian involvement in the Russian invasion of Ukraine, Belarus were required to play their home matches at neutral venues, and behind closed doors, until further notice.)
Attendance: 0
Referee: Nikola Dabanović (Montenegro)
8 September 2025
20:45 (21:45 UTC+3)

Greece	0–3	Denmark
	Report (FIFA); Report (UEFA)	Damsgaard 32'; Christensen 62'; Højlund 81'

Karaiskakis Stadium, Piraeus
Attendance: 31,172
Referee: Donatas Rumšas (Lithuania)

9 October 2025
20:45

Belarus	0–6	Denmark
	Report (FIFA); Report (UEFA)	Froholdt 14'; Højlund 19', 45'; Dorgu 45+6'; Dreyer 66', 78'

ZTE Arena, Zalaegerszeg (Hungary)
Attendance: 0
Referee: Filip Glova (Slovakia)
9 October 2025
20:45 (19:45 UTC+1)

Scotland	3–1	Greece
Christie 64'; Ferguson 80'; Dykes 90+3'	Report (FIFA); Report (UEFA)	Tsimikas 62'

Hampden Park, Glasgow
Attendance: 46,006
Referee: Espen Eskås (Norway)

12 October 2025
18:00 (17:00 UTC+1)

Scotland	2–1	Belarus
Adams 15'; McTominay 84'	Report (FIFA); Report (UEFA)	Kuchko 90+6'

Hampden Park, Glasgow
Attendance: 49,346
Referee: Marian Barbu (Romania)
12 October 2025
20:45

Denmark	3–1	Greece
Højlund 21'; Andersen 40'; Damsgaard 41'	Report (FIFA); Report (UEFA)	Tzolis 63'

Parken Stadium, Copenhagen
Attendance: 35,623
Referee: Michael Oliver (England)

15 November 2025
20:45 (21:45 UTC+2)

Greece	3–2	Scotland
Bakasetas 7'; Karetsas 57'; Tzolis 63'	Report (FIFA); Report (UEFA)	Gannon-Doak 65'; Christie 70'

Karaiskakis Stadium, Piraeus
Attendance: 18,405
Referee: Jesús Gil Manzano (Spain)
15 November 2025
20:45

Denmark	2–2	Belarus
Damsgaard 11'; Isaksen 79'	Report (FIFA); Report (UEFA)	Gromyko 62'; Demchenko 65'

Parken Stadium, Copenhagen
Attendance: 35,493
Referee: Sven Jablonski (Germany)

18 November 2025
20:45

Belarus	0–0	Greece
	Report (FIFA); Report (UEFA)

ZTE Arena, Zalaegerszeg (Hungary)
Attendance: 0
Referee: Damian Sylwestrzak (Poland)
18 November 2025
20:45 (19:45 UTC+0)

Scotland	4–2	Denmark
McTominay 3'; Shankland 78'; Tierney 90+3'; McLean 90+8'	Report (FIFA); Report (UEFA)	Højlund 57' (pen.); Dorgu 81'

Hampden Park, Glasgow
Attendance: 49,587
Referee: Szymon Marciniak (Poland)

== Goalscorers ==
There were 43 goals scored in 12 matches, for an average of 3.58 goals per match.

5 goals

- (Denmark national football team) Rasmus Højlund

3 goals

- (Denmark national football team) Mikkel Damsgaard
- (Greece national football team) Christos Tzolis

2 goals

- (Denmark national football team) Patrick Dorgu
- (Denmark national football team) Anders Dreyer
- (Greece national football team) Anastasios Bakasetas
- (Greece national football team) Konstantinos Karetsas
- (Scotland national football team) Ché Adams
- (Scotland national football team) Ryan Christie
- (Scotland national football team) Scott McTominay

1 goal

- (Belarus national football team) German Barkovsky
- (Belarus national football team) Nikita Demchenko
- (Belarus national football team) Valery Gromyko
- (Belarus national football team) Gleb Kuchko
- (Denmark national football team) Joachim Andersen
- (Denmark national football team) Andreas Christensen
- (Denmark national football team) Victor Froholdt
- (Denmark national football team) Gustav Isaksen
- (Greece national football team) Dimitrios Kourbelis
- (Greece national football team) Vangelis Pavlidis
- (Greece national football team) Kostas Tsimikas
- (Scotland national football team) Lyndon Dykes
- (Scotland national football team) Lewis Ferguson
- (Scotland national football team) Ben Gannon-Doak
- (Scotland national football team) Kenny McLean
- (Scotland national football team) Lawrence Shankland
- (Scotland national football team) Kieran Tierney

1 own goal

- (Belarus national football team) Zakhar Volkov (against Scotland)

== Discipline ==
A player or team official was automatically suspended for the next match for the following offences:

- Receiving a red card (red card suspensions could be extended for serious offences)
- Receiving two yellow cards in two different matches (yellow card suspensions were carried forward to the play-offs, but not the finals or any other future international matches)

The following suspensions were served during the qualifying matches:

Team	Player	Offence(s)	Suspended for match(es)
Belarus	Nikita Korzun	(yellow card) vs Greece (5 September 2025); (yellow card) vs Denmark (15 November 2025)	vs Greece (18 November 2025)
Belarus	Kiryl Pyachenin	(yellow card) vs Scotland (12 October 2025); (yellow card) vs Denmark (15 November 2025)	vs Greece (18 November 2025)
Denmark	Pierre-Emile Højbjerg	(yellow card) vs Scotland (5 September 2025); (yellow card) vs Belarus (9 October 2025)	vs Greece (12 October 2025)
Greece	Fotis Ioannidis	(yellow card) vs Scotland (9 October 2025); (yellow card) vs Denmark (12 October 2025)	vs Scotland (15 November 2025)
Greece	Christos Zafeiris	(yellow card) vs Scotland (9 October 2025); (yellow card) vs Denmark (12 October 2025)	vs Scotland (15 November 2025)
Greece	Anastasios Bakasetas	(yellow card) (yellow-red card) vs Scotland (15 November 2025)	vs Belarus (18 November 2025)
Scotland	Ryan Christie	(yellow card) vs Denmark (5 September 2025); (yellow card) vs Greece (9 October 2025)	vs Belarus (12 October 2025)
Scotland	Lewis Ferguson	(yellow card) vs Denmark (5 September 2025); (yellow card) vs Greece (9 October 2025)	vs Belarus (12 October 2025)
