= Ben Gannon-Doak =

Scottish footballer (born 2005)

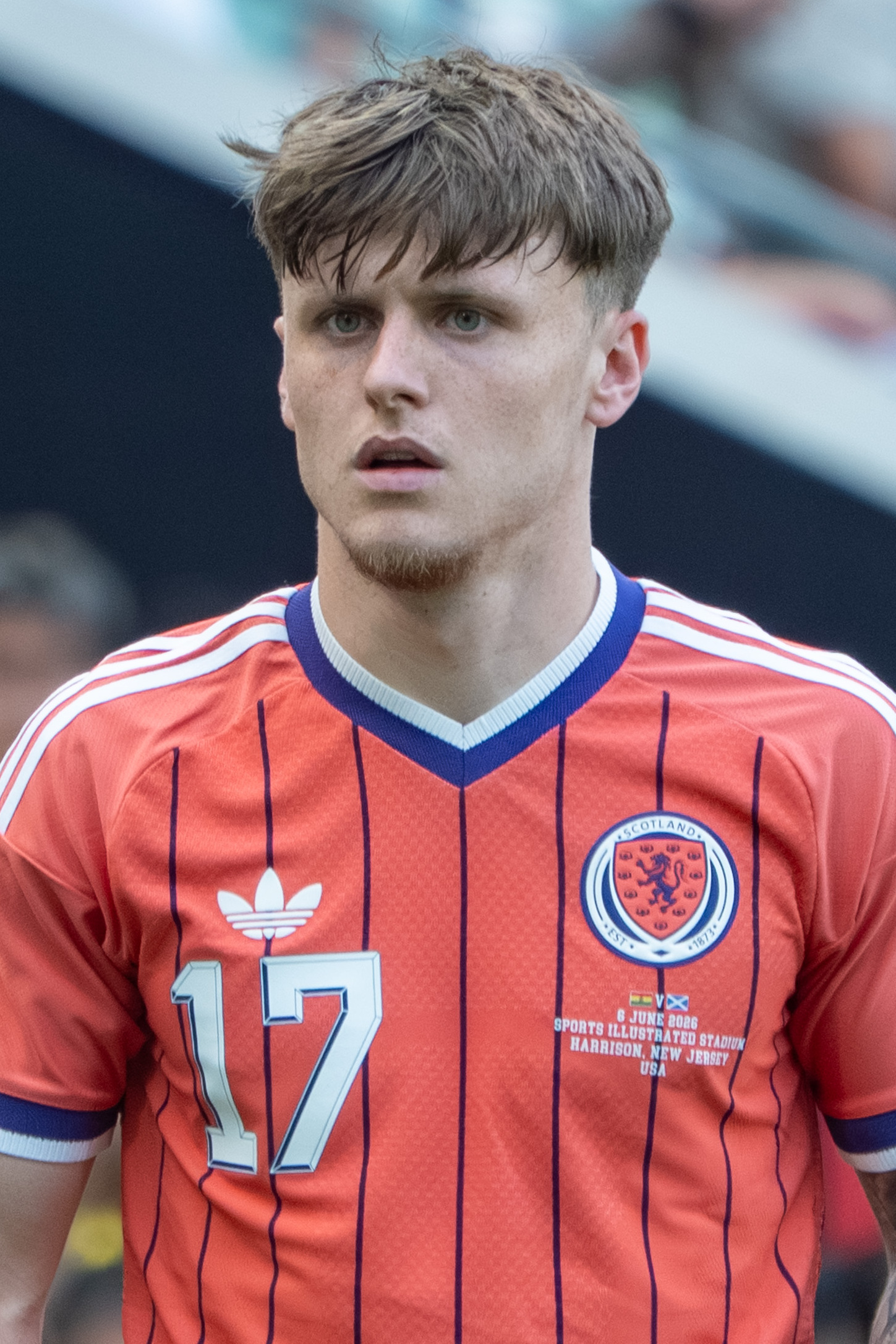
- Gannon-Doak with Scotland in 2026

Personal information
- Full name: Ben Gannon-Doak
- Birth name: Ben Doak
- Date of birth: 11 November 2005 (age 21)
- Place of birth: Dalry, North Ayrshire, Scotland
- Height: 5 ft 8 in (1.73 m)
- Positions: Right winger; attacking midfielder

Team information
- Current team: Bournemouth
- Number: 11

Youth career
- Dalry Rovers
- Ayr United
- Celtic

Senior career*
Years	Team	Apps	(Gls)
2021–2022	Celtic	2	(0)
2022–2025	Liverpool	3	(0)
2024–2025	→ Middlesbrough (loan)	24	(3)
2025–	Bournemouth	16	(0)

International career^{‡}
2019	Scotland U16	3	(0)
2021–2022	Scotland U17	6	(4)
2022–	Scotland U21	7	(2)
2024–	Scotland	23	(1)
- * Club domestic league appearances and goals as of 15:13, 21 November 2026 (UTC) ‡ National team caps and goals as of 22:40, 16 November 2026 (UTC)

Ben Gannon-Doak (né Doak; born 11 November 2005) is a Scottish professional footballer who plays as a right winger or attacking midfielder for Premier League club Bournemouth and the Scotland national team.

He began his youth career with local side Dalry Rovers before joining Ayr United and later Celtic; making his senior debut for the latter in January 2022. Shortly thereafter, he signed for Liverpool, where he became the youngest Scottish player to appear in the Premier League. In 2024, he spent a season on loan at Middlesbrough, earning EFL Young Player of the Month in November. In August 2025, he transferred to Bournemouth for an initial £20 million. Internationally, he has represented Scotland at under-16, under-17 and under-21 level, and made his senior debut against Poland in September 2024.

== Early life ==
Gannon-Doak was born in the small town of Dalry, North Ayrshire, on 11 November 2005.

== Club career ==
Gannon-Doak began his career at hometown club Dalry Rovers, before moving to Ayr United and then onto Celtic.

=== Celtic ===
On 26 December 2021, having turned 16 the previous month, Gannon-Doak was named on the bench for Celtic's 3–1 win away to St Johnstone. On 29 January 2022, he made his Celtic debut, coming on as a 68th minute substitute in a 1–0 Scottish Premiership win against Dundee United.

=== Liverpool ===
Gannon-Doak signed with Premier League club Liverpool in March 2022, with Celtic due to receive training compensation of around £600,000. On 9 November 2022, he made his debut for Liverpool when he came on as a 74th minute substitute in a 3–2 penalty shoot-out win against Derby County in the third round of the 2022–23 EFL Cup at Anfield. Five days later, he signed his first professional contract with Liverpool, having reached the age of 17. He made his league debut for Liverpool on 26 December in a 3–1 win at Aston Villa, becoming the youngest Scottish player to appear in the Premier League.

On 30 July 2023, Gannon-Doak scored his first senior goal for Liverpool in a pre-season friendly match against Leicester City, with his side winning 4–0 at the Singapore National Stadium. In December 2023, he was longlisted for the BBC Young Sports Personality of the Year Award. He missed most of the 2023–24 season after he underwent knee surgery in December.

==== Loan to Middlesbrough ====
On 30 August 2024, Gannon-Doak joined EFL Championship side Middlesbrough on a season-long loan. On 28 September, he made his first start for the club and scored his first competitive senior career goal in a 2–0 win over Stoke City.

After registering five assists in as many games in November 2024 he won the EFL Young Player of the Month award.

=== Bournemouth ===
On 18 August 2025, Gannon-Doak signed for fellow Premier League side Bournemouth for an initial fee of £20m with a further £5m in add-ons. A buy-back option was included in the deal for Liverpool. An injury suffered on international duty saw him make just eight appearances in his debut season.

== International career ==
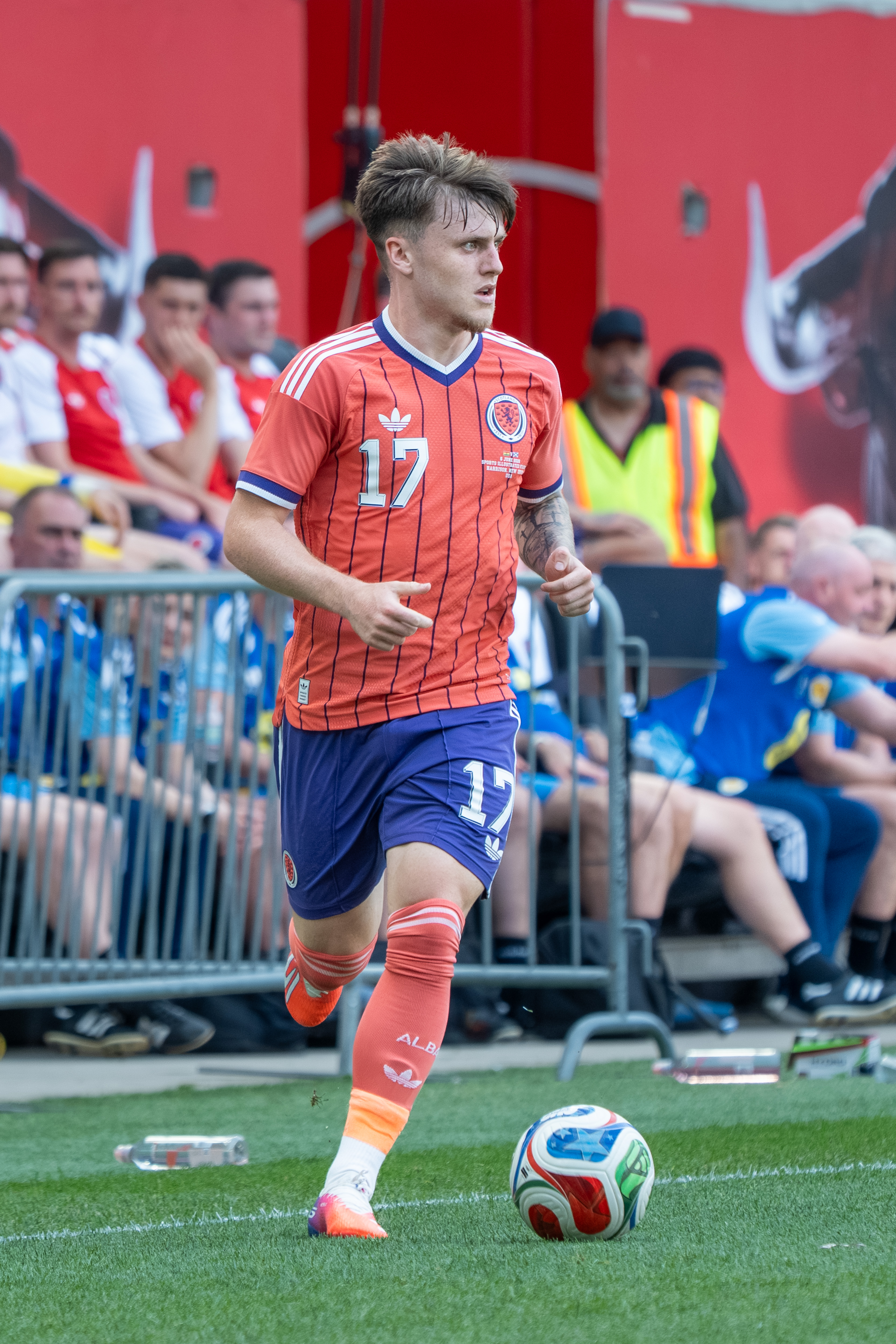
Gannon-Doak in 2026

On 2 September 2021, after previously representing the under-16s, Gannon-Doak made his debut for Scotland U17, scoring in a 1–1 draw against Wales. He helped the U17 team qualify for the 2022 UEFA European Under-17 Championship, but missed the tournament due to injury.

Gannon-Doak was included in the under-21 squad for the first time in September 2022, aged 16. He made his debut as a substitute on 22 September 2022 against Northern Ireland and scored within seven minutes; in doing so, he became the youngest ever goalscorer for the Scotland U21s.

In May 2024, Gannon-Doak was called up to the senior side for the first time, as part of their provisional squad for UEFA Euro 2024. On 4 June, he was forced to withdraw from the squad due to injury.

Gannon-Doak made his senior international debut on 5 September 2024, coming on as a substitute in a 3–2 defeat to Poland.

He scored his first senior international goal in a FIFA World Cup 2026 qualifier against Greece on 15 November 2025. Three days later, Gannon-Doak provided an assist for a bicycle kick by Scott McTominay in the 3rd minute of a 4–2 victory against Denmark, a match which sealed Scotland's first World Cup appearance since 1998; although he sustained an injury in the 21st minute of the match and had to be stretchered off.

On 19 May 2026, Gannon-Doak was selected in the 26-man squad for the 2026 FIFA World Cup.

== Personal life ==
Gannon-Doak is a practicing Roman Catholic.

His grandfather Martin Doak (1964–2024) was also a footballer, having made more than 300 appearances across two spells for Greenock Morton.

Upon transferring to Bournemouth in 2025, he adopted the name "Gannon-Doak" for the back of his shirt to reflect both his parents' names; in place of "Doak" which he had worn in seasons prior.

He married Rachel Kennedy in the summer of 2026.

== Career statistics ==
=== Club ===
As of match played 21 November 2026

Appearances and goals by club, season and competition
Club	Season	League			National cup (Note: Includes FA Cup)		League cup (Note: Includes EFL Cup)		Europe		Total	
Club	Season	Division	Apps	Goals	Apps	Goals	Apps	Goals	Apps	Goals	Apps	Goals
Celtic	2021–22	Scottish Premiership	2	0	0	0	0	0	0	0	2	0
Liverpool	2022–23	Premier League	2	0	2	0	1	0	0	0	5	0
Liverpool	2023–24	Premier League	1	0	0	0	1	0	3 (Note: Appearances in UEFA Europa League)	0	5	0
Liverpool	Total		3	0	2	0	2	0	3	0	10	0
Middlesbrough (loan)	2024–25	Championship	24	3	0	0	—		—		24	3
Bournemouth	2025–26	Premier League	8	0	0	0	1	0	—		9	0
Bournemouth	2026–27	Premier League	8	0	0	0	2	0	4	0	14	0
Bournemouth	Total		16	0	0	0	3	0	4	0	23	0
Career total			45	3	2	0	5	0	7	0	59	3

=== International ===
As of match played 16 November 2026

Appearances and goals by national team and year
National team	Year	Apps	Goals
Scotland
Scotland	2024	6	0
Scotland	2025	6	1
Scotland	2026	11	0
Total		23	1

Scores and results list Scotland's goal tally first.

List of international goals scored by Ben Gannon-Doak
No.	Date	Venue	Opponent	Score	Result	Competition
1.	15 November 2025	Karaiskakis Stadium, Piraeus, Greece	Greece	1–3	2–3	2026 FIFA World Cup qualification

== Honours ==
Individual

- EFL Young Player of the Month: November 2024
