= Nikita Demchenko =

Belarusian footballer

Personal information
- Date of birth: 6 September 2002 (age 24)
- Place of birth: Minsk, Belarus
- Height: 1.75 m (5 ft 9 in)
- Position: Midfielder

Team information
- Current team: Spartak Kostroma
- Number: 8

Youth career
- 2016–2019: Dinamo Minsk

Senior career*
Years	Team	Apps	(Gls)
2019–2025	Dinamo Minsk	80	(4)
2020	→ Smolevichi (loan)	12	(0)
2024	→ Dinamo-2 Minsk	1	(0)
2026	Vizela	2	(0)
2026–	Spartak Kostroma	0	(0)

International career^{‡}
2019	Belarus U19	2	(0)
2022–2023	Belarus U21	10	(0)
2024–	Belarus	8	(2)
- * Club domestic league appearances and goals as of 19 June 2026 ‡ National team caps and goals as of 15 November 2025

Nikita Demchenko (Belarusian: Мікіта Дземчанка Mikita Dziemchanka; Russian: Никита Демченко; born 6 September 2002) is a Belarusian professional footballer who plays as a midfielder for Russian First League club Spartak Kostroma and the Belarus national team.

== Career ==
After starting his career with Dinamo Minsk, on 2 January 2026, Demchenko joined Liga Portugal 2 club Vizela, signing a contract until June 2029.

== International goals ==
No.	Date	Venue	Opponent	Score	Result	Competition
1.	25 March 2025	Bank Respublika Arena, Masazır, Azerbaijan	Azerbaijan	2–0	2–0	Friendly
2.	15 November 2025	Parken Stadium, Copenhagen, Denmark	Denmark	2–1	2–2	2026 FIFA World Cup qualification

== Honours ==
Dinamo Minsk

- Belarusian Premier League: 2023, 2024
- Belarusian Super Cup: 2025
