= Gleb Kuchko =

Belarusian footballer (born 2005)

Personal information
- Full name: Gleb Alekseyevich Kuchko
- Date of birth: 3 June 2005 (age 21)
- Place of birth: Minsk, Belarus
- Height: 1.83 m (6 ft 0 in)
- Position: Midfielder

Team information
- Current team: Wisła Płock
- Number: 91

Youth career
- BATE Borisov
- 2020: Dynamo Brest
- 2021–2022: Rukh Brest

Senior career*
Years	Team	Apps	(Gls)
2022–	Wisła Płock II	54	(18)
2024–	Wisła Płock	16	(2)
2025–2026	→ Miedź Legnica (loan)	23	(1)

International career^{‡}
2019	Belarus U15	3	(1)
2021–2022	Belarus U17	7	(0)
2023	Belarus U19	4	(1)
2025–	Belarus U21	14	(0)
2025–	Belarus	2	(1)
- * Club domestic league appearances and goals as of 12:40, 25 September 2026 (UTC) ‡ National team caps and goals as of 19:05, 28 September 2026 (UTC)

Gleb Alekseyevich Kuchko (Belarusian: Глеб Аляксеевіч Кучко; Russian: Глеб Алексеевич Кучко; born 3 June 2005) is a Belarusian professional footballer who plays as a midfielder for Ekstraklasa club Wisła Płock.

== Early life ==
Kuchko was born on 3 June 2005 in Belarus. In 2025, he obtained Polish citizenship.

== Club career ==
As a youth player, Kuchko joined the youth academy of Belarusian side FC BATE Borisov. Following his stint there, he joined the youth academy of Belarusian side FC Dynamo Brest in 2020.

One year later, Kuchko joined the youth academy of Belarusian side Football Center Brest. Ahead of the 2022–23 season, he signed for Polish club Wisła Płock. Polish news website Weszło wrote in 2024 that he was "considered a considerable talent" while playing for the club. In 2025, Kuchko was sent on loan to Polish second-tier side Miedź Legnica.

== International career ==
Kuchko is a Belarus international. During October 2025, he played for the Belarus national team during their 2026 FIFA World Cup qualification campaign.

== Career statistics ==
=== International ===
As of match played 12 October 2025

Appearances and goals by national team and year
National team	Year	Apps	Goals
Belarus
Belarus	2025	2	1
Total		2	1

Scores and results list Belarus' goal tally first, score column indicates score after each Kuchko goal.

List of international goals scored by Gleb Kuchko
No.	Date	Venue	Opponent	Score	Result	Competition
1	12 October 2025	Hampden Park, Glasgow, Scotland	Scotland	1–2	1–2	2026 FIFA World Cup qualification

== Honours ==
Wisła Płock II

- IV liga Masovia: 2023–24
- Polish Cup (Płock regionals): 2023–24
