= German Barkovsky =

Belarusian footballer

Personal information
- Full name: German Anatolyevich Barkovsky
- Date of birth: 25 June 2002 (age 24)
- Place of birth: Bobruisk, Belarus
- Height: 1.91 m (6 ft 3 in)
- Position: Forward

Team information
- Current team: Polonia Warsaw (on loan from Hradec Králové)
- Number: 63

Youth career
- 2017–2019: Belshina Bobruisk

Senior career*
Years	Team	Apps	(Gls)
2019–2021	Belshina Bobruisk	34	(7)
2019	→ Belshina-2 Bobruisk	18	(7)
2022	Rukh Brest	0	(0)
2022	→ Isloch Minsk Raion (loan)	8	(4)
2022	Isloch Minsk Raion	6	(1)
2023	Energetik-BGU Minsk	20	(6)
2024–2025	Dinamo Brest	30	(10)
2025–2026	Puszcza Niepołomice	19	(3)
2025–2026	→ Piast Gliwice (loan)	31	(4)
2026–	Hradec Králové	0	(0)
2026–	→ Polonia Warsaw (loan)	7	(2)

International career^{‡}
2023	Belarus U21	6	(0)
2024–	Belarus	20	(1)
- * Club domestic league appearances and goals as of 15:05, 9 November 2026 (UTC) ‡ National team caps and goals as of 19:08, 15 November 2026 (UTC)

German Anatolyevich Barkovsky (Belarusian: Герман Анатольевіч Баркоўскі; Russian: Герман Анатольевич Барковский; born 25 June 2002) is a Belarusian professional footballer who plays as a forward for I liga club Polonia Warsaw, on loan from Hradec Králové, and the Belarus national team.

== Club career ==
On 28 January 2025, Dinamo Brest announced they had reached an agreement with Polish club Puszcza Niepołomice to transfer Barkovsky to the latter. The following day, he officially joined Puszcza on a six-month deal with an extension option.

After Puszcza's relegation, Barkovsky remained in the Polish top-flight; on 17 July 2025, he joined Piast Gliwice on a season-long loan with an option to buy.

On 19 August 2026, Barkovsky moved to Czech First League club Hradec Králové.

On 8 September 2026, Barkovsky joined I liga club Polonia Warsaw on a one-year loan deal.

== International career ==
Barkovsky made his debut for the Belarus national team on 11 June 2024 in a friendly against Israel at the Szusza Ferenc Stadion in Budapest, Hungary. He started the game and played 61 minutes, as Israel won 4–0.

== Career statistics ==
=== International ===
As of match played 15 November 2026

Appearances and goals by national team and year
National team	Year	Apps	Goals
Belarus
Belarus	2024	5	0
Belarus	2025	8	1
Belarus	2026	7	0
Total		20	1

Scores and results list Belarus' goal tally first, score column indicates score after each Barkovsky goal

List of international goals scored by German Barkovsky
No.	Date	Venue	Opponent	Score	Result	Competition
1	5 September 2025	Karaiskakis Stadium, Piraeus, Greece	Greece	1–5	1–5	2026 FIFA World Cup qualification
