= Ryan Christie =

Scottish footballer (born 1995)

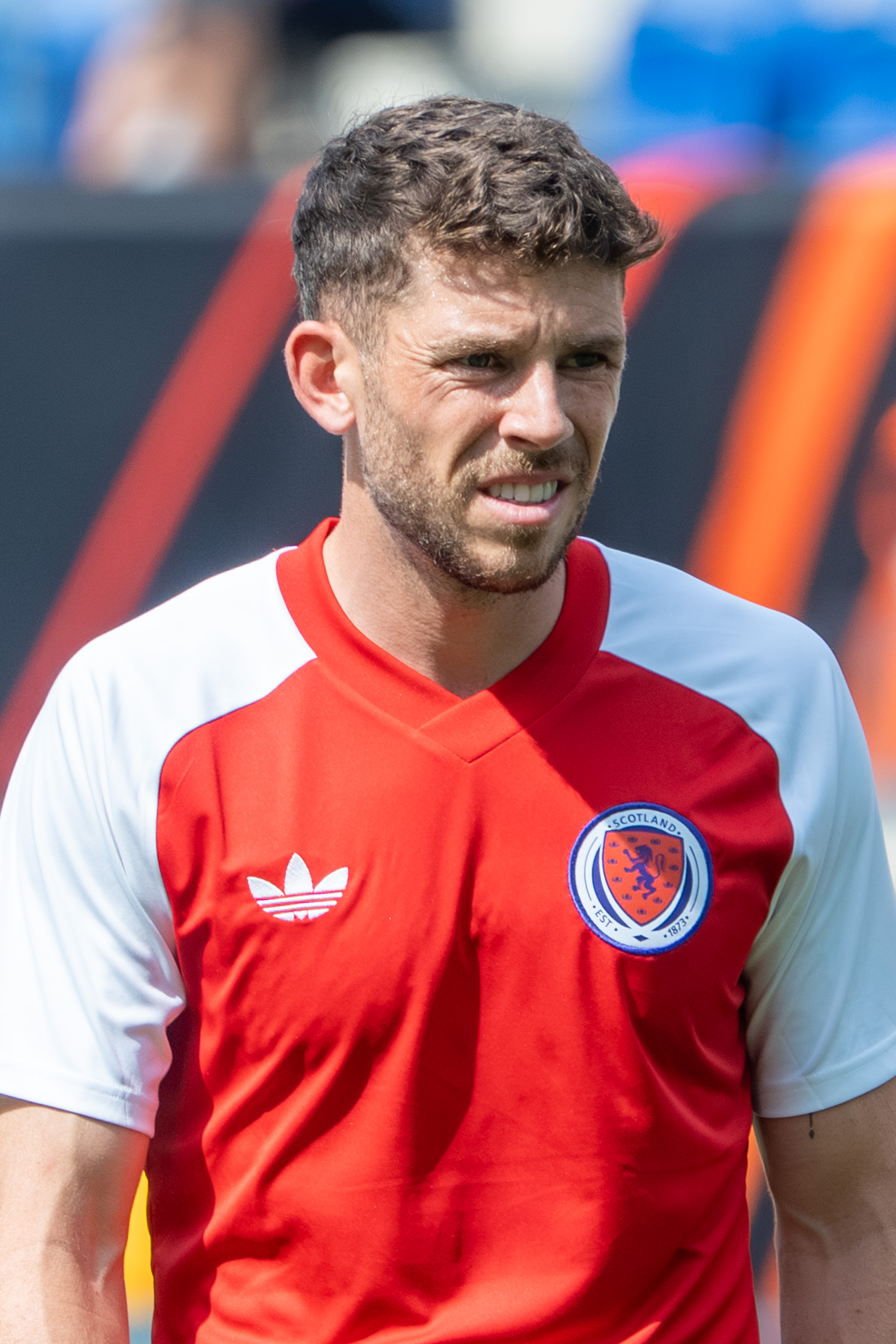
- Christie with Scotland in 2026

Personal information
- Full name: Ryan Christie
- Date of birth: 22 February 1995 (age 31)
- Place of birth: Inverness, Scotland
- Height: 5 ft 10 in (1.78 m)
- Positions: Attacking midfielder; winger

Team information
- Current team: Bournemouth
- Number: 10

Youth career
- 2005–2013: Inverness Caledonian Thistle

Senior career*
Years	Team	Apps	(Gls)
2013–2015	Inverness Caledonian Thistle	56	(9)
2015–2021	Celtic	95	(27)
2015	→ Inverness Caledonian Thistle (loan)	7	(1)
2017–2018	→ Aberdeen (loan)	45	(10)
2021–	Bournemouth	171	(8)

International career^{‡}
2014–2016	Scotland U21	9	(1)
2017–	Scotland	76	(11)
- * Club domestic league appearances and goals as of 23:16, 15 November 2026 (UTC) ‡ National team caps and goals as of 16 November 2026 (UTC)

Ryan Christie (born 22 February 1995) is a Scottish professional footballer who plays as a midfielder or winger for Premier League club Bournemouth and the Scotland national team.

Christie began his career with Inverness Caledonian Thistle before joining Celtic in 2015, and had two spells on loan at Aberdeen. He has also represented the Scotland under-21 and full national teams.

== Club career ==
=== Inverness Caledonian Thistle ===
Christie was born in Inverness in 1995; he is the son of footballer Charlie Christie, who was playing for Caledonian Thistle at the time and who had previously been a reserve player with Celtic.

Christie joined the Inverness Caledonian Thistle youth system aged 10, before eventually signing his first professional contract in 2011. He signed a new deal with the club under Terry Butcher, and was among several youngsters to be promoted to the club's first team.

Christie made his debut in the Scottish Premiership against Celtic on 29 December 2013. He came on as a substitute in the 100th minute in the Scottish League Cup Final against Aberdeen, a game that Inverness lost on penalties. Despite this, Christie helped the club finish in the top-six of the Scottish Premiership. His first goal for Inverness came in a 2–1 loss against Motherwell on 1 April 2014. Christie added two more goals later in the season against Dundee United and St Johnstone. After impressive displays for Inverness, Christie signed a new contract with the club at the end of the 2013–14 season.

Ahead of the 2014–15 season, Christie was told by John Hughes to challenge himself by fighting to regain his place in the team. He scored his first goal of the 2014–15 season in a 2–0 win over Hamilton Academical. Christie's performances against Dundee, Motherwell, Celtic, Kilmarnock and Partick Thistle saw him win the SPFL Young Player of the Month for August. During a match against St Mirren in October 2014, he was sent-off for the first time in his career – being dismissed by referee Willie Collum for two-bookable offences. Christie added to his earlier success by winning the SPFL Young Player of the Month award for February 2015, and his eye-catching form over the whole season subsequently saw him shortlisted for the Young Player of the Year award. Although he didn't win that accolade, he was later honoured with the SFWA Young Player of the Year award. Christie started the 2015 Scottish Cup Final and was later substituted for James Vincent, who scored the winning goal in a 2–1 victory over Falkirk. After the match, Christie described winning the Scottish Cup as "unbelievable, hard to put into words".

=== Celtic ===
==== 2015–16 ====
On 1 September 2015, Christie joined Celtic on a four-year deal. After signing for the Scottish champions, Christie was immediately sent back to Inverness on a season-long loan deal. He sustained a knee injury against Motherwell in November, and was recalled by Celtic so he could work with their medical staff at their Lennoxtown training complex. In December 2015, Celtic announced they would be recalling Christie from his loan spell at Inverness.

Christie made his debut for Celtic on 23 January 2016 in their 3–1 win over St Johnstone, coming on as an 88th-minute substitute for Stuart Armstrong.

==== Aberdeen loans ====
On 24 January 2017, Christie joined Aberdeen on loan until the end of the 2016–17 season. He scored his first goal for Aberdeen on 4 February 2017, in a 2–0 win against Partick Thistle. He helped Aberdeen finish second in the 2016–17 Scottish Premiership and progress to the 2017 Scottish Cup Final, but was unable to take part in the cup final because it was against his parent club Celtic.

Christie returned to Aberdeen on loan for most of the 2017–18 season, moving in June 2017 as part of a deal for Jonny Hayes.

==== 2018–19 ====
Christie returned to Celtic for the 2018–19 season. Neil Lennon, who returned to Celtic as manager later in the season, said in July 2019 that he had wanted to sign Christie for Hibernian during the summer of 2018 as part of a proposed deal for John McGinn. In the 2018–19 League Cup semi-final against Hearts at Murrayfield, Christie won a penalty, caused a goalkeeping error and hit a "wonderful left-foot shot" leading to each goal in the eventual 3–0 victory. Christie signed a new contract with Celtic in November 2018. On 2 December, he scored the only goal of the 2018 Scottish League Cup Final at Hampden against former club Aberdeen. His season ended abruptly on 14 April 2019 in the Scottish Cup semi-final, again at Hampden against Aberdeen, when he suffered facial fractures in an aerial collision with opponent Dominic Ball, who was sent off for the reckless nature of the challenge.

==== 2019–20 ====
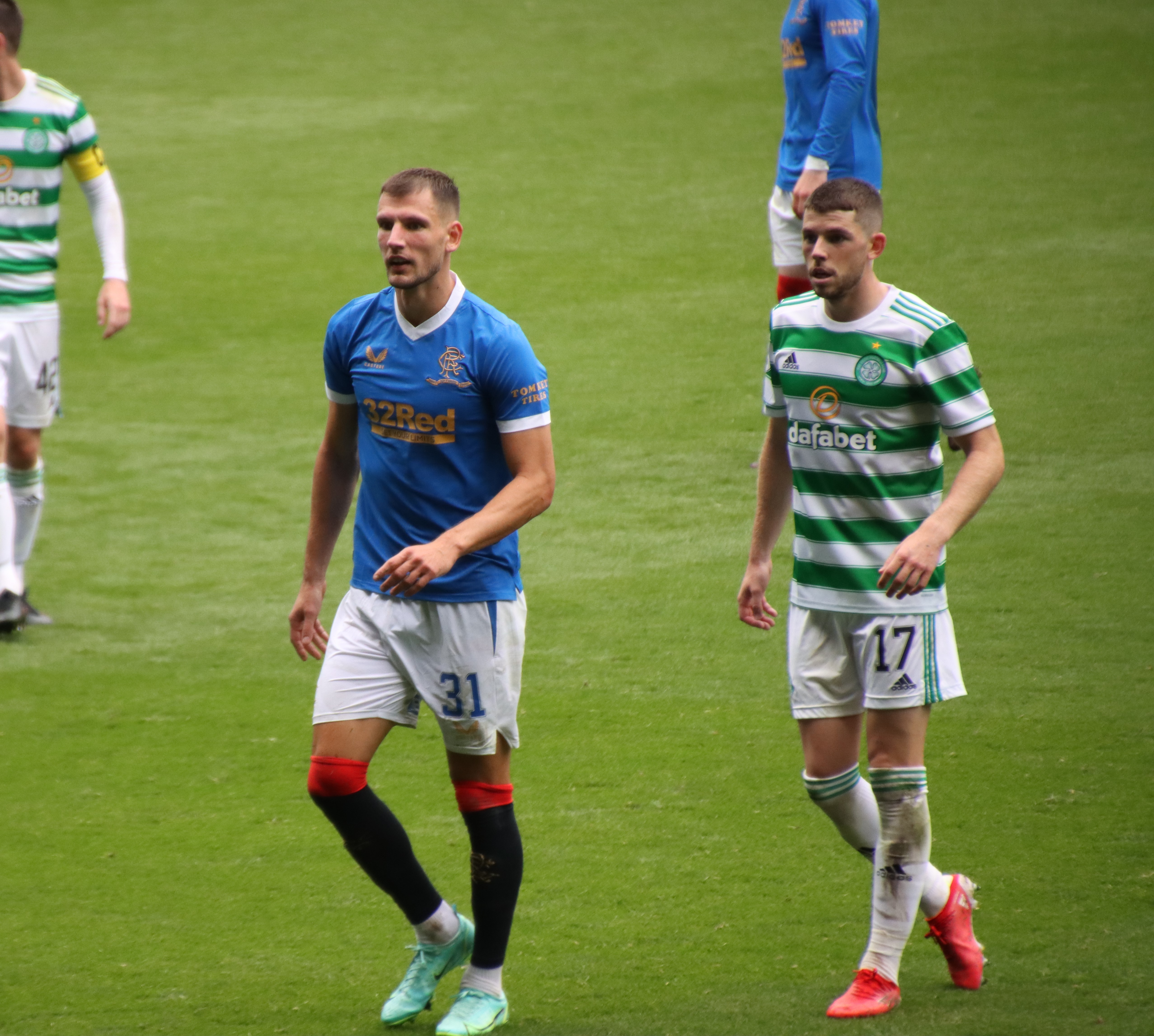
Christie playing for Celtic in 2021

Christie scored a hat-trick in a 7–0 win against St Johnstone in the first game of the 2019–20 Scottish Premiership season. In October 2020, he scored the opening goal of the 2019–20 Scottish Cup semi-final against Aberdeen (delayed from its usual April scheduling due the COVID-19 pandemic in Scotland, which also led to Celtic being awarded the Premiership title after the season was curtailed) with a curling left-footed shot from outside the penalty area – Celtic won 2–0. In the final against Hearts he scored a very similar goal, again the first of the match and with almost the same amount of time elapsed, but then missed his penalty in the subsequent shootout following a 3–3 draw after extra time; he was the only Celtic player to fail with his attempt as they won the trophy.

=== Bournemouth ===
On 31 August 2021, Christie moved to England, joining EFL Championship club Bournemouth on a three-year contract, for a reported transfer fee of around £1.5 million. On 11 September 2021, Christie came off the bench to make his Bournemouth debut in the side's 3–0 win over Barnsley. On 8 October 2022, he scored his first Premier League goal in a 2–1 victory over Leicester City.

In April 2025, he sustained a groin injury which would sideline him for the remainder of the 2024–25 season. Regardless, his performances up to that point earned him the Supporters' Player of the Season award from the club.

On 8 September 2026, in the third round of the 2026-27 EFL Cup, he scored a hat-trick in a 4–0 win over EFL Championship side Lincoln City.

== International career ==
On 25 August 2014, Christie was called up by Scotland U21. After being left on the bench against Slovakia U21, Christie finally made his Scotland U21 debut against Luxembourg U21 on 9 September 2014, coming on as a substitute for Lewis Macleod in the second half, which Scotland U21 won 3–0.

Christie received his first call-up to the senior Scotland squad for a friendly against the Netherlands in November 2017, and played the full 90 minutes of the 1–0 defeat. He scored his first international goal on 16 November 2019, opening the scoring with a curling shot from outside the penalty area in a 2–1 away win over Cyprus in UEFA Euro 2020 qualification. In September 2020, he scored penalties in successive matches as Scotland drew with Israel and defeated the Czech Republic in the 2020–21 UEFA Nations League.

In October 2020, Christie was required to pull out of the Scotland squad for a Euro 2020 play-off semi-final against Israel after being in close contact with Stuart Armstrong, who had tested positive for COVID-19. A month later, Christie returned to the team and scored Scotland's only goal in the Euro 2020 play-off final against Serbia; they won the tie on a penalty shootout after a 1–1 draw, qualifying for a major tournament for the first time in 22 years.

Christie was a member of Scotland's squad for UEFA Euro 2020, making one appearance at the tournament in the team's opening 2–0 defeat to the Czech Republic.

On 7 June 2024, Christie was named in Scotland's squad for UEFA Euro 2024. A week later, he started the opening match of the tournament against Germany, winning his 50th cap for Scotland (as did teammate Scott McTominay) in the 5–1 loss. He went on to appear as a substitute against both Switzerland and Hungary as Scotland finished bottom of Group A with one point from three matches.

On 19 May 2026, Christie was selected in the 26-man squad for the 2026 FIFA World Cup. In the second group stage game against Morocco, he and teammate Grant Hanley became only the 11th and 12th players to reach 70 caps for the men's team.

== Career statistics ==
=== Club ===
As of match played 8 November 2026

Appearances and goals by club, season and competition
Club	Season	League			National cup (Note: Includes Scottish Cup, FA Cup)		League cup (Note: Includes Scottish League Cup, EFL Cup)		Europe		Total	
Club	Season	Division	Apps	Goals	Apps	Goals	Apps	Goals	Apps	Goals	Apps	Goals
Inverness Caledonian Thistle	2013–14	Scottish Premiership	15	3	1	0	1	0	—		17	3
Inverness Caledonian Thistle	2014–15	Scottish Premiership	35	4	6	0	1	0	—		42	4
Inverness Caledonian Thistle	2015–16 (Note: Part of this season was spent on loan from Celtic)	Scottish Premiership	13	3	0	0	2	0	2 (Note: Appearances in UEFA Europa League)	0	17	3
Inverness Caledonian Thistle	Total		63	10	7	0	4	0	2	0	76	10
Celtic	2015–16	Scottish Premiership	5	1	1	0	0	0	—		6	1
Celtic	2016–17	Scottish Premiership	5	1	0	0	1	0	1 (Note: Appearance in UEFA Champions League)	0	7	1
Celtic	2018–19	Scottish Premiership	23	9	3	0	2	2	10 (Note: Two appearances in UEFA Champions League, eight appearances in UEFA Europa League)	0	38	11
Celtic	2019–20	Scottish Premiership	24	11	4	2	3	0	14 (Note: Six appearances and four goals in UEFA Champions League, eight appearances and three goals in UEFA Europa League)	7	45	20
Celtic	2020–21	Scottish Premiership	34	5	2	1	1	0	9 (Note: Two appearances and one goal in UEFA Champions League, five appearances in UEFA Europa League)	1	46	7
Celtic	2021–22	Scottish Premiership	4	0	0	0	0	0	5 (Note: Two appearances in UEFA Champions League, three appearances and one goal in UEFA Europa League)	1	9	1
Celtic	Total		95	27	10	3	7	2	39	9	151	41
Aberdeen (loan)	2016–17	Scottish Premiership	13	6	2	1	—		—		15	7
Aberdeen (loan)	2017–18	Scottish Premiership	32	4	5	2	2	0	4	2	43	8
Aberdeen (loan)	Total		45	10	7	3	2	0	4	2	58	15
Bournemouth	2021–22	Championship	38	3	1	0	—		—		39	3
Bournemouth	2022–23	Premier League	32	1	1	1	3	0	—		36	2
Bournemouth	2023–24	Premier League	37	0	3	0	3	1	—		43	1
Bournemouth	2024–25	Premier League	29	2	2	0	1	0	—		32	2
Bournemouth	2025–26	Premier League	26	2	0	0	1	0	—		27	2
Bournemouth	2026–27	Premier League	9	0	0	0	2	3	4	0	15	3
Bournemouth	Total		171	8	7	1	10	4	4	0	192	13
Career total			374	55	31	7	23	6	49	11	472	79

=== International ===
As of match played 16 November 2026

Appearances and goals by national team and year
National team	Year	Apps	Goals
Scotland	2017	1	0
Scotland	2018	4	0
Scotland	2019	6	1
Scotland	2020	5	3
Scotland	2021	10	0
Scotland	2022	9	1
Scotland	2023	10	0
Scotland	2024	13	2
Scotland	2025	6	2
Scotland	2026	12	2
Total		76	11

As of match played 6 October 2026
Scores and results list Scotland's goal tally first, score column indicates score after each Christie goal

List of international goals scored by Ryan Christie
No.	Date	Venue	Opponent	Score	Result	Competition
1	16 November 2019	GSP Stadium, Nicosia, Cyprus	Cyprus	1–0	2–1	UEFA Euro 2020 qualification
2	4 September 2020	Hampden Park, Glasgow, Scotland	Israel	1–0	1–1	2020–21 UEFA Nations League B
3	7 September 2020	Andrův stadion, Olomouc, Czech Republic	Czech Republic	2–1	2–1	2020–21 UEFA Nations League B
4	12 November 2020	Red Star Stadium, Belgrade, Serbia	Serbia	1–0	1–1 (a.e.t.) (5–4 p)	UEFA Euro 2020 qualification
5	24 September 2022	Hampden Park, Glasgow, Scotland	Republic of Ireland	2–1	2–1	2022–23 UEFA Nations League B
6	3 June 2024	Estádio Algarve, Faro/Loulé, Portugal	Gibraltar	1–0	2–0	Friendly
7	12 October 2024	Stadion Maksimir, Zagreb, Croatia	Croatia	1–0	1–2	2024–25 UEFA Nations League A
8	9 October 2025	Hampden Park, Glasgow, Scotland	Greece	1–1	3–1	2026 FIFA World Cup qualification
9	15 November 2025	Karaiskakis Stadium, Piraeus, Greece	Greece	2–3	2–3	2026 FIFA World Cup qualification
10	30 May 2026	Hampden Park, Glasgow, Scotland	Curaçao	4–1	4–1	Friendly
11	6 October 2026	Hampden Park, Glasgow, Scotland	Slovenia	1–0	1–2	2026–27 UEFA Nations League B

== Honours ==
Inverness Caledonian Thistle

- Scottish Cup: 2014–15

Celtic

- Scottish Premiership: 2015–16, 2018–19, 2019–20
- Scottish Cup: 2018–19, 2019–20
- Scottish League Cup: 2018–19, 2019–20

Individual

- SPFL Young Player of the Month: August 2014, February 2015
- SFWA Young Player of the Year: 2014–15
