= 2014 FC BATE Borisov season =

BATE Borisov
2014 season
- Manager: Alyaksandr Yermakovich
- Stadium: Haradski Stadium (Note: Played two home matches at the Haradski Stadium before moving to the new Borisov Arena.) (Old stadium); Borisov Arena (New stadium)
- Belarusian Premier League: 1st
- 2013–14 Belarusian Cup: Quarter-finals
- 2014–15 Belarusian Cup: Progressed to 2015 season
- Belarusian Super Cup: Winners
- 2014–15 UEFA Champions League: Group stage

The 2014 season was Football Club BATE Borisov's 17th consecutive season in the Belarusian Premier League. In addition to the domestic league, BATE Borisov participated in the 2013–14 Belarusian Cup, the 2014–15 Belarusian Cup, the Belarusian Super Cup and the 2014–15 UEFA Champions League.

== Squad ==
Note: Flags indicate national team as defined under FIFA eligibility rules; some limited exceptions apply. Players may hold more than one non-FIFA nationality.

No.	Pos.	Nation	Player
2	DF	BLR	Dzmitry Likhtarovich
3	GK	BLR	Vital Hayduchyk
5	MF	BLR	Yevgeny Yablonsky
7	MF	BLR	Alyaksandr Karnitsky
8	MF	BLR	Alyaksandr Valadzko
9	MF	BLR	Ilya Aleksiyevich
13	FW	BLR	Nikolay Signevich
14	DF	RUS	Anri Khagush
16	GK	BLR	Syarhey Chernik
17	MF	BLR	Alyaksandr Pawlaw
19	FW	BLR	Dzmitry Mazalewski
20	FW	BLR	Vitali Rodionov

No.	Pos.	Nation	Player
21	DF	BLR	Yegor Filipenko
22	DF	SRB	Filip Mladenović
23	MF	BLR	Edgar Olekhnovich
25	MF	BLR	Dmitry Baga
30	GK	LVA	Germans Māliņš
33	DF	BLR	Denis Polyakov
34	GK	BLR	Artyom Soroko
42	DF	BLR	Maksim Valadzko
55	DF	SRB	Nemanja Tubić
62	FW	BLR	Mikhail Gordeychuk
77	MF	UKR	Andriy Yakovlyev
—	MF	BLR	Aleksey Rios

== Competitions ==
=== Overview ===
Competition	First match	Last match	Starting round	Final position	Record							
Competition	First match	Last match	Starting round	Final position	Pld	W	D	L	GF	GA	GD	Win %
Belarusian Premier League	29 March 2014	30 November 2014	Matchday 1	Winners	32	20	11	1	68	21	+47	62.50
2013–14 Belarusian Cup	22 March 2014	22 March 2014	Quarter-finals	Quarter-finals	1	0	0	1	1	2	−1	0.00
2014–15 Belarusian Cup	11 October 2014	11 October 2014	Round of 16	Progressed	1	1	0	0	2	1	+1	100.00
Belarusian Super Cup	15 March 2014		Final	Winners	1	1	0	0	1	0	+1	100.00
2014–15 UEFA Champions League	15 July 2014	10 December 2014	Second qualifying round	Group stage	12	3	3	6	10	28	−18	25.00
Total					47	25	14	8	82	52	+30	53.19

Source: Competitions

=== Belarusian Super Cup ===
15 March 2014 Final	BATE Borisov	1–0	Minsk	Minsk
15:00 (UTC+3)	Mladenović 20'; Baga (yellow card) 24'; Signevich (yellow card) 90'	Report	Ranđelović (yellow card) 22'	Stadium: Football Manege; Referee: Sergey Tsinkevich

=== Belarusian Premier League ===
==== Results summary ====
Overall								Home						Away					
Pld	W	D	L	GF	GA	GD	Pts	W	D	L	GF	GA	GD	W	D	L	GF	GA	GD
32	20	11	1	68	21	+47	71	8	8	0	30	6	+24	12	3	1	38	15	+23

Source: Competitions

==== First phase ====
===== League table =====
Pos	Team	Pld	W	D	L	GF	GA	GD	Pts	Qualification
1	BATE Borisov	22	15	6	1	46	12	+34	51	Qualification for championship round
2	Dinamo Minsk	22	15	4	3	33	8	+25	49	Qualification for championship round
3	Naftan Novopolotsk	22	10	7	5	30	20	+10	37	Qualification for championship round
4	Gomel	22	8	8	6	21	21	0	32 (Note: Gomel placed above Shakhtyor Soligorsk by better head-to-head record (1–0, 1–0).)	Qualification for championship round
5	Shakhtyor Soligorsk	22	9	5	8	20	20	0	32	Qualification for championship round

Source: football.by
Rules for classification: 1st points; 2nd head-to-head (points, matches won, goal difference, goals scored); 3rd matches won; 4th goal difference; 5th goals scored

===== Matches =====
29 March 2014 1	Shakhtyor Soligorsk	2–0	BATE Borisov	Soligorsk
12:30 (UTC+3)	Māliņš 49' (o.g.); Rios 90+1'	Report		Stadium: Stroitel Stadium; Referee: Sergey Tsinkevich

5 April 2014 2	BATE Borisov	1–0	Minsk	Borisov
19:00 (UTC+3)	Filipenko 61'	Report		Stadium: Haradski Stadium; Referee: Oleg Cherepnev

13 April 2014 3	Gomel	0–3	BATE Borisov	Gomel
14:00 (UTC+3)		Report	Rodionov 22'; Polyakov 36'; Krivets 40' (pen.)	Stadium: Central Stadium; Referee: Vadim Panchenko

19 April 2014 4	BATE Borisov	5–2	Belshina Bobruisk	Borisov
19:00 (UTC+3)	Rodionov 23'; Gordeychuk 37', 63'; A. Valadzko 65'; Krivets 74'	Report	Karshakevich 53'; Khlebosolov 90'	Stadium: Haradski Stadium; Referee: Vitaly Sevostyanik

27 April 2014 5	Dinamo Brest	0–4	BATE Borisov	Brest
19:00 (UTC+3)		Report	Filipenko (yellow card) 13'; Krivets 27', 70', 81'; Gordeychuk 66'	Stadium: OSK Brestskiy; Referee: Mikhail Lavskiy

4 May 2014 6	Torpedo-BelAZ Zhodino	1–4	BATE Borisov	Zhodino
14:00 (UTC+3)	Vaskow 68'	Report	Rodionov 12', 56'; Gordeychuk 59', 88'	Stadium: Torpedo Stadium; Referee: Igor Kruk

10 May 2014 7	BATE Borisov	3–0	Slutsk	Borisov
19:00 (UTC+3)	Gordeychuk 8'; Rodionov 85'; Signevich 90+3'	Report		Stadium: Borisov Arena; Referee: Vadim Panchenko

15 May 2014 8	BATE Borisov	0–0	Dinamo Minsk	Borisov
18:00 (UTC+3)	Polyakov (yellow card) 42'	Report		Stadium: Borisov Arena; Referee: Aleksei Kulbakov

26 May 2014 9	BATE Borisov	3–1	Naftan Novopolotsk	Borisov
19:00 (UTC+3)	Mladenović 52' (pen.); Signevich 82', 86'	Report	Hunchak 10'	Stadium: Borisov Arena; Referee: Sergey Tsinkevich

1 June 2014 10	Dnepr Mogilev	0–1	BATE Borisov	Mogilev
19:00 (UTC+3)		Report	Krivets 79' (pen.)	Stadium: Spartak Stadium; Referee: Mikhail Lavskiy

7 June 2014 11	BATE Borisov	0–0	Neman Grodno	Borisov
19:00 (UTC+3)		Report		Stadium: Borisov Arena; Referee: Oleg Cherepnev

12 June 2014 12	BATE Borisov	0–0	Shakhtyor Soligorsk	Borisov
19:00 (UTC+3)		Report		Stadium: Borisov Arena; Referee: Igor Kruk

16 June 2014 13	Minsk	1–4	BATE Borisov	Minsk
18:00 (UTC+3)	Makas 90'	Report	Aleksiyevich 17'; Signevich 34'; Krivets 54'; Pawlaw 86'	Stadium: Torpedo Stadium; Referee: Vadim Panchenko

22 June 2014 14	BATE Borisov	0–0	Gomel	Borisov
19:00 (UTC+3)		Report		Stadium: Borisov Arena; Referee: Vitaly Sevostyanik

29 June 2014 15	Belshina Bobruisk	1–2	BATE Borisov	Bobruisk
18:00 (UTC+3)	Khlebosolov 61'	Report	A. Valadzko 12'; Signevich 69'	Stadium: Spartak Stadium; Referee: Oleg Cherepnev

5 July 2014 16	BATE Borisov	4–0	Dinamo Brest	Borisov
20:00 (UTC+3)	Signevich 5'; Polyakov 19'; Rodionov 21', 69'	Report	Zhevnerov (yellow card) 8'	Stadium: Borisov Arena; Referee: Vladimir Ishchenko

10 July 2014 17	BATE Borisov	1–1	Torpedo-BelAZ Zhodino	Borisov
20:00 (UTC+3)	Krivets 34' (pen.)	Report	Kontsevoy 56'	Stadium: Borisov Arena; Referee: Andrey Soroka

18 July 2014 18	Slutsk	1–3	BATE Borisov	Slutsk
18:30 (UTC+3)	Saitō 21'	Report	M. Valadzko 8'; Rodionov 24'; Krivets 90+4'	Stadium: City Stadium; Referee: Vitaly Sevostyanik

9 August 2014 20	Naftan Novopolotsk	1–1	BATE Borisov	Novopolotsk
18:30 (UTC+3)	Yakimov 45'	Report	Krivets 37'	Stadium: Atlant Stadium; Referee: Vadim Panchenko

13 August 2014 19	Dinamo Minsk	0–2	BATE Borisov	Minsk
18:30 (UTC+3)	Simović (yellow card) 77'	Report	Gordeychuk 26'; Aleksiyevich 45'	Stadium: Traktor Stadium; Referee: Igor Kruk

16 August 2014 21	BATE Borisov	3–0	Dnepr Mogilev	Borisov
20:30 (UTC+3)	Polyakov 25'; Yakovlyev 74'; Gordeychuk 87'	Report		Stadium: Borisov Arena; Referee: Mikhail Lavskiy

31 August 2014 22	Neman Grodno	1–2	BATE Borisov	Grodno
17:00 (UTC+3)	Zubovich 71' (pen.)	Report	Olekhnovich 31'; Yakovlyev 45'	Stadium: Neman Stadium; Referee: Sergey Tsinkevich

==== Championship round ====
===== League table =====
Pos	Team	Pld	W	D	L	GF	GA	GD	Pts	Qualification
1	BATE Borisov (C)	32	20	11	1	68	21	+47	71	Qualification for Champions League second qualifying round
2	Dinamo Minsk	32	18	7	7	44	21	+23	61	Qualification for Europa League second qualifying round
3	Shakhtyor Soligorsk	32	14	8	10	35	28	+7	50 (Note: Shakhtyor Soligorsk placed above Torpedo-BelAZ Zhodino by better head-to-head record (3 wins, 1 draw).)	Qualification for Europa League first qualifying round
4	Torpedo-BelAZ Zhodino	32	13	11	8	38	30	+8	50	Qualification for Europa League first qualifying round
5	Naftan Novopolotsk	32	11	10	11	40	43	−3	43	
6	Gomel	32	10	8	14	29	41	−12	38	

Source: football.by
Rules for classification: 1st points; 2nd head-to-head (points, matches won, goal difference, goals scored); 3rd matches won; 4th goal difference; 5th goals scored
(C) Champions

===== Matches =====
13 September 2014 23	BATE Borisov	1–1	Torpedo-BelAZ Zhodino	Borisov
19:30 (UTC+3)	Mladenović 6' (pen.)	Report	Kozeka 39'	Stadium: Borisov Arena; Referee: Vitaly Sevostyanik

22 September 2014 24	BATE Borisov	0–0	Dinamo Minsk	Borisov
19:00 (UTC+3)	Mladenović (yellow card) 58'	Report	Bangura (yellow card) 52'; Adamović (yellow card) 58'; Kontsevoy (yellow card) 58'	Stadium: Borisov Arena; Referee: Sergey Tsinkevich

26 September 2014 25	Naftan Novopolotsk	2–2	BATE Borisov	Novopolotsk
16:00 (UTC+3)	Teplov 66'; Khotov 82'	Report	Karnitsky 38'; Signevich 87'	Stadium: Atlant Stadium; Referee: Oleg Cherepnev

5 October 2014 26	Gomel	1–2	BATE Borisov	Gomel
18:15 (UTC+3)	Bliznyuk 10'	Report	Gordeychuk 18'; Karnitsky 49'	Stadium: Central Stadium; Referee: Vadim Panchenko

16 October 2014 27	Shakhtyor Soligorsk	1–4	BATE Borisov	Soligorsk
19:00 (UTC+3)	Haliuza 38' (pen.)	Report	Gordeychuk 3' (pen.); Karnitsky 14', 23', 88'; Tubić (yellow card) 31'; Likhtarovich (yellow card) 57'	Stadium: Stroitel Stadium; Referee: Sergey Tsinkevich

27 October 2014 28	Torpedo-BelAZ Zhodino	2–2	BATE Borisov	Zhodino
17:30 MSK (UTC+3)	Kontsevoy 43'; Burko 90+2'	Report	Signevich 16'; Yablonsky 81'	Stadium: Torpedo Stadium; Referee: Igor Kruk

1 November 2014 29	Dinamo Minsk	1–2	BATE Borisov	Minsk
13:00 MSK (UTC+3)	Dja Djédjé (yellow card) 79'; Politevich (yellow card) 83'; Nikolić 90+5' (pen.)	Report	Khagush 69'; Polyakov 74'	Stadium: Traktor Stadium; Referee: Vadim Panchenko

9 November 2014 30	BATE Borisov	4–0	Naftan Novopolotsk	Borisov
15:30 MSK (UTC+3)	Gordeychuk 24'; Rodionov 26', 72'; Karnitsky 40'	Report		Stadium: Borisov Arena; Referee: Mikhail Lavskiy

22 November 2014 31	BATE Borisov	4–0	Gomel	Borisov
13:00 MSK (UTC+3)	Gordeychuk 4'; Rodionov 10'; Olekhnovich 29'; Signevich 57'	Report		Stadium: Borisov Arena; Referee: Viktor Shimusik

30 November 2014 32	BATE Borisov	1–1	Shakhtyor Soligorsk	Borisov
13:00 MSK (UTC+3)	Karnitsky 7'	Report	Yanush 87'	Stadium: Borisov Arena; Referee: Sergey Tsinkevich

=== Belarusian Cup ===
==== 2013–14 ====
22 March 2014 Quarter-finals	Neman Grodno	2–1 (a.e.t.)	BATE Borisov	Grodno
16:00 (UTC+3)	Zubovich 73'; Tarasovs 100'	Report	Krivets 82' (pen.)	Stadium: Neman Stadium; Referee: Aleksei Kulbakov

==== 2014–15 ====
11 October 2014 Round of 16	BATE Borisov	2–1 (a.e.t.)	Slutsk	Borisov
17:00 (UTC+3)	Tubić 86'; Signevich 108'	Report	Saitō 61'	Stadium: Borisov Arena; Referee: Igor Kruk

Quarter-finals took place during the 2015 season.

=== UEFA Champions League ===
==== 2014–15 ====
===== Qualifying rounds =====
====== Second qualifying round ======
15 July 2014 First leg	BATE Borisov (Belarus)	0–0	(Albania) Skënderbeu	Borisov, Belarus
20:00 (UTC+3)	Krivets (yellow card) 38'; Rodionov (yellow card) 54'	Report	Progni (yellow card) 43'; Radaš (yellow card) 44'; Orelesi (yellow card) 50'; Arapi (yellow card) 70'; Sefa (yellow card) 72'	Stadium: Borisov Arena; Attendance: 12,671; Referee: Georgi Kabakov (Bulgaria)

22 July 2014 Second leg	Skënderbeu (Albania)	1–1 (1–1 (a) agg.)	(Belarus) BATE Borisov	Korçë, Albania
20:00 CEST (UTC+2)	Radaš 67', (yellow card) 83'	Report	Khagush 29', (yellow card) 37'; Olekhnovich (yellow card) 34'; Filipenko (yellow card) 58'; A. Valadzko (yellow card) 62'; Pawlaw (yellow card) 82'; M. Valadzko (yellow card) 86'	Stadium: Skënderbeu Stadium; Attendance: 6,200; Referee: Ante Vučemilović-Šimunović Jr. (Croatia)
Note: 1–1 on aggregate. BATE Borisov won on away goals.

====== Third qualifying round ======
29 July 2014 First leg	Debrecen (Hungary)	1–0	(Belarus) BATE Borisov	Debrecen, Hungary
20:30 CEST (UTC+2)	Sidibe (yellow card) 51', (goal) 56' (pen.); Bódi (yellow card) 82'	Report		Stadium: Nagyerdei Stadion; Attendance: 10,191; Referee: Szymon Marciniak (Poland)

5 August 2014 Second leg	BATE Borisov (Belarus)	3–1 (3–2 agg.)	(Hungary) Debrecen	Borisov, Belarus
20:30 (UTC+3)	Chernik (yellow card) 19'; A. Valadzko 39'; Rodionov 66', (yellow card) 86'; Krivets 90+4'; Signevich (yellow card) 90+6'	Report	Bouadla (yellow card) 9' (yellow-red card) 38'; Sidibe 20' (pen.)	Stadium: Borisov Arena; Attendance: 12,788; Referee: Stefan Johannesson (Sweden)
Note: BATE Borisov won 3–2 on aggregate.

===== Play-off round =====
20 August 2014 First leg	Slovan Bratislava (Slovakia)	1–1	(Belarus) BATE Borisov	Bratislava, Slovakia
20:45 CEST (UTC+2)	Hudák (yellow card) 24'; Soumah (yellow card) 62'; Vittek 80'; Lásik (yellow card) 85'	Report	Khagush (yellow card) 29'; Krivets (yellow card) 35'; Jablonský 44' (o.g.); A. Valadzko (yellow card) 90+2'	Stadium: Štadión Pasienky; Attendance: 12,752; Referee: Olegário Benquerença (Portugal)

26 August 2014 Second leg	BATE Borisov (Belarus)	3–0 (4–1 agg.)	(Slovakia) Slovan Bratislava	Borisov, Belarus
21:45 (UTC+3)	Gordeychuk (yellow card) 41'; Olekhnovich (yellow card) 43'; Likhtarovich (yellow card) 50'; Krivets (yellow card) 84'; Rodionov (yellow card) 85'	Report	Soumah (yellow card) 47' (yellow-red card) 79'; Gorosito (yellow card) 50'; Kolčák (yellow card) 87'	Stadium: Borisov Arena; Attendance: 12,752; Referee: Wolfgang Stark (Germany)
Note: BATE Borisov won 4–1 on aggregate.

===== Group stage =====
Pos	Team	Pld	W	D	L	GF	GA	GD	Pts	Qualification	POR	SHK	ATH	BATE
1	(Portugal) Porto	6	4	2	0	16	4	+12	14	Advance to knockout phase	—	1–1	2–1	6–0
2	(Ukraine) Shakhtar Donetsk	6	2	3	1	15	4	+11	9	Advance to knockout phase	2–2	—	0–1	5–0
3	(Spain) Athletic Bilbao	6	2	1	3	5	6	−1	7	Transfer to Europa League	0–2	0–0	—	2–0
4	(Belarus) BATE Borisov	6	1	0	5	2	24	−22	3		0–3	0–7	2–1	—

Source: UEFA
Rules for classification: Group stage tiebreakers

17 September 2014 1	Porto (Portugal)	6–0	(Belarus) BATE Borisov	Porto, Portugal
19:45 WEST (UTC+1)	Brahimi 5', 32', 57'; Martínez 37'; Adrián 61'; Aboubakar 76'	Report	Likhtarovich (yellow card) 7'; Olekhnovich (yellow card) 56'	Stadium: Estádio do Dragão; Attendance: 35,108; Referee: Bas Nijhuis (Netherlands)

30 September 2014 2	BATE Borisov (Belarus)	2–1	(Spain) Athletic Bilbao	Borisov, Belarus
21:45 (UTC+3)	Palyakow 19', (yellow card) 68'; Karnitsky 41'	Report	Aduriz 45'; Beñat (yellow card) 84'; Toquero (yellow card) 85'; Laporte (yellow card) 90+2'	Stadium: Borisov Arena; Attendance: 11,886; Referee: Stéphane Lannoy (France)

21 October 2014 3	BATE Borisov (Belarus)	0–7	(Ukraine) Shakhtar Donetsk	Borisov, Belarus
21:45 (UTC+3)	Chernik (yellow card) 27'; Mladenović (yellow card) 80'	Report	Alex Teixeira 11'; Luiz Adriano 28' (pen.), 36', 40', 44', 82' (pen.), (yellow card) 88'; Douglas Costa 35'	Stadium: Borisov Arena; Attendance: 12,113; Referee: Ivan Bebek (Croatia)

5 November 2014 4	Shakhtar Donetsk (Ukraine)	5–0	(Belarus) BATE Borisov	Lviv, Ukraine (Note: The match was played at the Arena Lviv in Lviv, instead of Shakhtar Donetsk regular stadium, the Donbass Arena in Donetsk, due to the war conditions in Eastern Ukraine.)
21:45 EET (UTC+2)	Srna 19'; Luiz Adriano (yellow card) 45+2', (goal) 58' (pen.), 83', 90+3'; Alex Teixeira 48'	Report	Khagush (yellow card) 45+2' (yellow-red card) 45+2'	Stadium: Arena Lviv; Attendance: 29,173; Referee: Wolfgang Stark (Germany)

25 November 2014 5	BATE Borisov (Belarus)	0–3	(Portugal) Porto	Borisov, Belarus
20:00 MSK (UTC+3)	Hayduchyk (yellow card) 41'; Olekhnovich (yellow card) 45'; Yablonsky (yellow card) 61'	Report	Marcano (yellow card) 10'; Herrera 56'; Martínez 65'; Tello 89'	Stadium: Borisov Arena; Attendance: 10,147; Referee: Ovidiu Hațegan (Romania)

10 December 2014 6	Athletic Bilbao (Spain)	2–0	(Belarus) BATE Borisov	Bilbao, Spain
20:45 CET (UTC+1)	Iraola (yellow card) 24'; San José 47'; Susaeta 88'; Rico (yellow card) 90+3'	Report	Yablonsky (yellow card) 22'	Stadium: San Mamés; Attendance: 42,852; Referee: Daniele Orsato (Italy)
