= 2015 FC BATE Borisov season =

FC BATE Borisov
2015 season
- Chairperson: Anatoli Kapski
- Manager: Alyaksandr Yermakovich
- Stadium: Borisov Arena
- Belarusian Premier League: 1st
- Belarusian Cup (14–15): Winners
- Belarusian Cup (15–16): Fourth round
- UEFA Champions League (14–15): Group stage
- UEFA Champions League (15–16): Group Stage
- Belarusian Super Cup: Winners
- Highest home attendance: 12,498 vs. Videoton
Home colours	Away colours

The 2015 FC BATE Borisov season was the 28th edition of FC BATE Borisov existence and their 18th consecutive season in the Belarusian Premier League. BATE Borisov entered the season as the league's 10-time defending champions. Beyond the Premier League, BATE Borisov is participating in the UEFA Champions League and the Belarusian Cup.

The most notable accomplishment by the club this season was their domestic double, and reaching the UEFA Champions League group stage for the second time in their history. It was the also the second time a Belarusian football club reached the group stage of the Champions League. In their domestic league, Borisov went 11 matches before conceding a goal.

== Squad ==
Squad No.	Name	Nationality	Position(s)	Date of Birth (Age)	Signed from
Goalkeepers
16	Syarhey Chernik	(Belarus)	GK	5 March 1988 (age 38)	(Belarus) Neman Grodno
34	Artem Soroko	(Belarus)	GK	4 January 1992 (age 34)	The Academy
35	Anton Chichkan	(Belarus)	GK	7 October 1995 (age 31)	The Academy
Defenders
Midfielders
Forwards

== Competitive ==
=== Belarusian Premier League ===
==== League table ====
Pos	Team	Pld	W	D	L	GF	GA	GD	Pts	Qualification or relegation
1	BATE Borisov (C)	26	20	5	1	44	11	+33	65	Qualification for the Champions League second qualifying round
2	Dinamo Minsk	26	15	8	3	36	13	+23	53	Qualification for the Europa League first qualifying round
3	Shakhtyor Soligorsk	26	14	7	5	47	27	+20	49	Qualification for the Europa League first qualifying round
4	Belshina Bobruisk	26	12	7	7	39	19	+20	43	
5	Granit Mikashevichi	26	12	6	8	30	32	−2	42	

Source: football.by, Soccerway
Rules for classification: 1) Points; 2) Head-to-head points; 3) Head-to-head matches won; 4) Head-to-head goal difference; 5) Head-to-head goals scored; 6) Goal difference; 7) Matches won; 8) Goals scored; 9) Draw.
(C) Champions

==== Matches ====
10 April 2015 1	BATE Borisov	1–0	Slavia	Barysaw
12:00 UTC+3	Mladenović 36'	Report	Tarasenka (yellow card) 53'; Slabashevich (yellow card) 57'; Tikhonovsky (yellow card) 78'	Stadium: Borisov Arena; Attendance: 5,291; Referee: Oleg Murashkevich

19 April 2015 2	Dinamo Minsk	0–2	BATE Borisov	Minsk
07:00 UTC+3		Report	Volodko 56'; Rodionov 76'	Stadium: Stadyen Traktar; Attendance: 4,200; Referee: Igor Kruk

25 April 2015 3	BATE Borisov	2–0	Gomel	Barysaw
UTC+3		Report		Stadium: Borisov Arena; Attendance: 5,334

4 May 2015 4	Neman Grodno	0–1	BATE Borisov	Grodno
UTC+3		Report		Stadium: Neman Stadium

10 May 2015 5	Belshina	0–1	BATE Borisov	Bobruisk
UTC+3		Report		Stadium: Spartak Stadium; Attendance: 1,700

16 May 2015 6	Shakhtyor	0–0	BATE Borisov	Soligorsk
UTC+3		Report		Stadium: Stroitel Stadium

20 May 2015 7	Torpedo Zhodino	0–0	BATE Borisov	Zhodino
12:30 UTC+3		Report		Stadium: Torpedo Stadium; Attendance: 3,900

30 May 2015 8	BATE Borisov	1–0	Minsk	Barysaw
UTC+3		Report		Stadium: Borisov Arena; Attendance: 4,848; Referee: Sergey Tsinkevich

5 June 2015 9	Granit	0–1	BATE Borisov	Luninets
UTC+3		Report		Stadium: Polesye Stadium; Attendance: 3,000; Referee: Oleg Murashkevich

18 June 2015 10	BATE Borisov	4–0	Vitebsk	Barysaw
UTC+3		Report		Stadium: Borisov Arena; Attendance: 4,949; Referee: Vladimir Ishchenko

22 June 2015 11	Naftan	1–2	BATE Borisov	Novopolotsk
UTC+3		Report		Stadium: Atlant Stadium; Attendance: 1,200; Referee: Sergey Tsinkevich

28 June 2015 12	BATE Borisov	1–0	Dinamo Brest	Barysaw
UTC+3		Report		Stadium: Borisov Arena; Attendance: 5,132; Referee: Dmitriy Dolya

5 July 2015 13	Slutsk	0–1	BATE Borisov	Slutsk
UTC+3		Report		Stadium: City Stadium; Attendance: 1,790

10 July 2015 14	Slavia	3–5	BATE Borisov	Mozyr
UTC+3		Report		Stadium: Yunost Stadium; Attendance: 2,500; Referee: Vadim Panchenko

10 August 2015 15	BATE Borisov	0–1	Dinamo Minsk	Barysaw
UTC+3		Report		Stadium: Borisov Arena; Attendance: 8,122; Referee: Igor Kruk

14 August 2015 16	Gomel	0–0	BATE Borisov	Gomel
UTC+3		Report		Stadium: Central Stadium; Attendance: 3,200; Referee: Oleg Murashkevich

22 August 2015 17	BATE Borisov	7–1	Neman Grodno	Barysaw
UTC+3		Report		Stadium: Borisov Arena; Attendance: 5,049; Referee: Vladimir Ishchenko

31 August 2015 18	BATE Borisov	1–0	Belshina	Barysaw
UTC+3		Report		Stadium: Borisov Arena; Attendance: 5,108; Referee: Vital Sevastsyanik

12 September 2015 19	BATE Borisov	1–1	Shakhtyor	Barysaw
UTC+3		Report		Stadium: Borisov Arena; Attendance: 5,255

20 September 2015 20	BATE Borisov	1–0	Torpedo Zhodino	Barysaw
UTC+3		Report		Stadium: Borisov Arena; Referee: Aliaksei Kulbakou

25 September 2015 21	Minsk	1–2	BATE Borisov	Minsk
10:30 UTC+3		Report		Stadium: FC Minsk Stadium; Referee: Vadim Panchenko

4 October 2015 22	BATE Borisov	1–1	Granit	Barysaw
10:30 UTC+3	Dubra (yellow card) 55'; Yablonskiy (yellow card) 60'; Milunović 81'	Report	Tsimashenka 5'; Yawseenka (yellow card) 42'	Stadium: Borisov Arena; Attendance: 5,270; Referee: Mikhail Lavskiy

16 October 2015 23	Vitebsk	0–2	BATE Borisov	Vitebsk
17:00 UTC+3		Report	Rios 23'; Mazalewski 31'	Stadium: Vitebsky Central Sport Complex; Referee: Aliaksei Kulbakov

25 October 2015 24	BATE Borisov	2–1	Naftan	Barysaw
14:30 UTC+3	Hayduchyk (yellow card) 11'; Mazalewski 15' 75'	Summary	Hatkevich (yellow card) 9'; Volkov (yellow card) 19'; Yelezarenko (yellow card) 43'; Hunchak 79'	Stadium: Borisov Arena; Attendance: 4,659; Referee: Viktor Shimusik

31 October 2015 25	Dinamo Brest	0–1	BATE Borisov	Brest, Belarus
12:00 UTC+3	Razhkow (yellow card) 9' (yellow-red card); Kavalewski (yellow card) 44'	Summary	Mladenović (yellow card) 69'; Aleksiyevich (yellow card) 70'; Gordeichuk 71'; Hayduchyk (yellow card) 90+2'	Stadium: Regional Sport Complex Brestskiy; Attendance: 800; Referee: Oleg Murashkevich

8 November 2015 26	BATE Borisov	4–1	Slutsk	Barysaw
12:00 UTC+3	Rios 20' 55'; Nikolić 31' (pen.); Karnitsky 81'	Summary	Aliseiko (yellow card) 41'; Bobko 46'; Hlyabko (yellow card) 80'; Tsvetinsky (yellow card) 88'; Milko (yellow card) 90+2'	Stadium: Borisov Arena; Attendance: 2,200; Referee: Andrey Soroka

=== Belarusian Cup ===
==== 2014–15 ====
All previous rounds were played during the 2014 FC BATE Borisov season.

===== Quarterfinals =====
21 March 2015 First leg	BATE Borisov	1–0	Neman Grodno	Borisov
19:30	Baha 41'	Report		Stadium: Borisov Arena; Attendance: 5,127; Referee: Vadim Panchenko (Mogilev)

4 April 2015 Second leg	Neman Grodno	1–2 (1–3 agg.)	BATE Borisov	Grodno
16:00	Zabelin 82'	Report	Rodionov 48'; Gordeichuk 55'	Stadium: Neman Stadium; Attendance: 1,500; Referee: Mikhail Lavsky (Gomel)

===== Semifinals =====
15 April 2015 First leg	BATE Borisov	0–0	Dinamo Minsk	Borisov
19:30		Report		Stadium: Borisov Arena; Attendance: 5,421; Referee: Sergey Tsinkevich (Osipovichi)

29 April 2015 Second leg	Dinamo Minsk	1–3 (1–3 agg.)	BATE Borisov	Minsk
17:30	Bećiraj 78'	Report	Gordeichuk 51', 69'; Rodionov 58'	Stadium: Traktor Stadium; Attendance: 2,500; Referee: Vadim Panchenko (Mogilev)

===== Final =====
24 May 2015	BATE Borisov	4–1	Shakhtyor Soligorsk	Central Stadium, Gomel
17:00	Gordeichuk 52'; Rodionov 61'; Karnitsky 65'; Signevich 73'	Report	Kamarowski 72'	Attendance: 9,100; Referee: Igor Kruk (Molodechno)

==== 2015–16 ====
The first match was played in late November 2015

=== UEFA Champions League ===
==== Second qualifying round ====
15 July 2015 First leg	BATE Borisov (Belarus)	2–1	(Republic of Ireland) Dundalk	Barysaw
19:30	Karnitsky 11'; Yablonskiy 38'	Report	McMillan 32'	Stadium: Borisov Arena; Attendance: 11,421; Referee: Vlado Glođović (Serbia)

22 July 2015 Second leg	Dundalk (Republic of Ireland)	0–0 (1–2 agg.)	(Belarus) BATE Borisov	Dundalk
20:45		Report		Stadium: Oriel Park; Attendance: 3,103; Referee: Stavros Tritsonis (Greece)

==== Third qualifying round ====
28 July 2015 First leg	Videoton (Hungary)	1–1	(Belarus) BATE Borisov	Székesfehérvár
20:30	Vinícius 89'	Report	Karnitsky 56'	Stadium: Sóstói Stadion; Attendance: 3,118; Referee: Aleksandar Stavrev (Macedonia)

5 August 2015 Second leg	BATE Borisov (Belarus)	1–0 (2–1 agg.)	(Hungary) Videoton	Barysaw
19:30	Nikolić 82'	Report		Stadium: Borisov Arena; Attendance: 12,498; Referee: Kenn Hansen (Denmark)

==== Play-off round ====
18 August 2015 First leg	BATE Borisov (Belarus)	1–0	(Serbia) Partizan	Barysaw
20:45	Gordeichuk 75'	Report		Stadium: Borisov Arena; Attendance: 11,628; Referee: Craig Thomson (Scotland)

26 August 2015 Second leg	Partizan (Serbia)	2–1 (2–2 (a) agg.)	(Belarus) BATE Borisov	Belgrade
20:45	Zhavnerchik 74' (o.g.); Šaponjić 90+3'	Report	Stasevich 25'	Stadium: Partizan Stadium; Attendance: 27,234; Referee: Svein Oddvar Moen (Norway)

==== Group stage ====
Pos	Team	Pld	W	D	L	GF	GA	GD	Pts	Qualification	BAR	ROM	LEV	BATE
1	(Spain) Barcelona	6	4	2	0	15	4	+11	14	Advance to knockout phase	—	6–1	2–1	3–0
2	(Italy) Roma	6	1	3	2	11	16	−5	6	Advance to knockout phase	1–1	—	3–2	0–0
3	(Germany) Bayer Leverkusen	6	1	3	2	13	12	+1	6	Transfer to Europa League	1–1	4–4	—	4–1
4	(Belarus) BATE Borisov	6	1	2	3	5	12	−7	5		0–2	3–2	1–1	—

Source: UEFA
Rules for classification: Group stage tiebreakers

16 September 2015 1	Bayer Leverkusen (Germany)	4–1	(Belarus) BATE Borisov	Leverkusen, Germany
20:45 CEST (UTC+02:00)	Mehmedi 4'; Papadopoulos (yellow card) 41'; Çalhanoğlu 47', 76' (pen.); Hernández 59'	Report	Milunović 13'; Baha (yellow card) 45'; Mladenović (yellow card) 75'; Signevich (yellow card) 87'	Stadium: BayArena; Attendance: 24,280; Referee: Danny Makkelie (Netherlands)

29 September 2015 2	BATE Borisov (Belarus)	3–2	(Italy) Roma	Barysaw, Belarus
20:45 CEST (UTC+02:00)	Stasevich 8'; Mladenović 12', 30'; Milunović (yellow card) 27'; Dubra (yellow card) 90'	Report	Digne (yellow card) 12'; De Rossi (yellow card) 46'; Gervinho 66'; Torosidis 82'; Manolas (yellow card) 87'	Stadium: Borisov Arena; Attendance: 12,767; Referee: Mark Clattenburg (England)

20 October 2015 3	BATE Borisov (Belarus)	0–2	(Spain) Barcelona	Barysaw, Belarus
20:45 CEST (UTC+02:00)	Palyakow (yellow card) 29'; M. Valadzko (yellow card) 43'; Hayduchyk (yellow card) 61'; Karnitsky (yellow card) 82'; Milunović (yellow card) 83'; A. Valadzko (yellow card) 88'	Report	Busquets (yellow card) 23'; Alves (yellow card) 41'; Rakitić 48', 65'; Gumbau (yellow card) 74'	Stadium: Borisov Arena; Attendance: 13,073; Referee: Manuel De Sousa (Portugal)

4 November 2015 4	Barcelona (Spain)	3–0	(Belarus) BATE Borisov	Barcelona, Spain
20:45 CET (UTC+02:00)	Neymar 30' (pen.) 83'; Dani Alves (yellow card) 51'; Suárez 60'	Report	Mladenović (yellow card) 30'; Mazalewski (yellow card) 44'; Nikolić (yellow card) 80'	Stadium: Camp Nou; Attendance: 68,502; Referee: (Hungary) István Vad

24 November 2015 5	BATE Borisov (Belarus)	1–1	(Germany) Bayer Leverkusen	Barysaw, Belarus
18:00 CET (UTC+01:00)	Gordeichuk 2'	Report	Mehmedi 68'	Stadium: Borisov Arena; Attendance: 12,601; Referee: (France) Clément Turpin

9 December 2015 6	Roma (Italy)	0–0	(Belarus) BATE Borisov	Rome, Italy
20:45 CET (UTC+01:00)				Stadium: Stadio Olimpico; Attendance: 29,489; Referee: Martin Atkinson

=== Belarusian Super Cup ===
14 March 2015	Shakhtyor Soligorsk	0–0 (0–3 p)	BATE Borisov	Pinsk
15:00 UTC+3		Report		Stadium: Volna Stadium; Attendance: 3,100; Referee: Sergey Tsinkevich (Osipovichi)
	Penalties
	Kamarowski (penalty missed); Čović (penalty missed); Kuzmyanok (penalty missed)		(penalty scored) Gordeichuk; (penalty scored) Yablonskiy; (penalty scored) Stasevich

== Statistics ==
=== Appearances and goals ===
No.	Pos	Nat	Player	Total		Premier League		Belarusian Cup		Champions League	
No.	Pos	Nat	Player	Apps	Goals	Apps	Goals	Apps	Goals	Apps	Goals

=== Disciplinary ===
Position	Nation	Number	Name	Premier League	Belarusian Cup	Champions League	Total

=== Goalscorers ===
Rank	No.	Nat.	Name	Premier League	Belarusian Cup	Champions League	Total
