= 2016 FC BATE Borisov season =

2016–2017 BATE season
- Ground: Borisov Arena; Barysaw, Belarus
- Chairman: Anatoli Kapski
- Manager: Alyaksandr Yermakovich
- League: Belarusian Premier League
- 2016: 1st
Home colours	Away colours

The 2016–2017 FC BATE Borisov season is the 20th consecutive season in the Belarusian Premier League. The team is not competing in Europe but are participating in the Belarusian Cup.

== Squad ==
Note: Flags indicate national team as defined under FIFA eligibility rules; some limited exceptions apply. Players may hold more than one non-FIFA nationality.

No.	Pos.	Nation	Player
3	DF	BLR	Vital Hayduchyk
4	DF	LVA	Kaspars Dubra
5	MF	BLR	Yevgeniy Yablonskiy
8	MF	BLR	Alyaksandr Valadzko
10	MF	SRB	Mirko Ivanić
11	FW	BLR	Dmitry Antilevsky
13	FW	BLR	Mikalay Signevich
14	DF	EST	Artur Pikk
15	DF	BLR	Maksim Zhavnerchik
16	GK	BLR	Syarhey Vyeramko
17	MF	BLR	Alyaksey Ryas
19	DF	SRB	Nemanja Milunović
20	FW	BLR	Vitali Rodionov
22	MF	BLR	Ihar Stasevich
23	MF	BLR	Edhar Alyakhnovich

No.	Pos.	Nation	Player
33	DF	BLR	Dzyanis Palyakow
34	GK	BLR	Artem Soroko
42	DF	BLR	Maksim Valadzko
43	MF	BLR	Nikita Filippovich
44	DF	BLR	Vladislav Malkevich
45	FW	BLR	Vladislav Mukhamedov
46	MF	BLR	Aleksey Khanevich
48	GK	BLR	Denis Scherbitskiy
49	MF	BLR	Aleksandr Dzhigero
62	MF	BLR	Mikhail Gordeichuk
77	MF	BLR	Yury Kendysh
80	MF	GEO	Valerian Gvilia
81	MF	BLR	Alexander Hleb
—	MF	BLR	Mikhail Bely
—	MF	BLR	Yevgeniy Berezkin

=== League table ===
Pos	Team	Pld	W	D	L	GF	GA	GD	Pts	Qualification or relegation
1	BATE Borisov (C)	30	22	4	4	73	25	+48	70	Qualification for the Champions League second qualifying round
2	Shakhtyor Soligorsk	30	17	8	5	46	20	+26	59	Qualification for the Europa League first qualifying round
3	Dinamo Minsk	30	15	10	5	46	28	+18	55	Qualification for the Europa League first qualifying round
4	Minsk	30	15	8	7	49	24	+25	53	
5	Torpedo-BelAZ Zhodino	30	13	9	8	47	33	+14	48	

Source: BFF (in Russian), Soccerway
Rules for classification: 1) Points; 2) Head-to-head points; 3) Head-to-head goal difference; 4) Head-to-head goals scored; 5) Goal difference; 6) Matches won; 7) Goals scored; 8) Play-off (only if deciding champion); 9) Draw.
(C) Champions
