= 2015–16 FC Barcelona season =

117th season in existence of FC Barcelona

Barcelona
2015–16 season
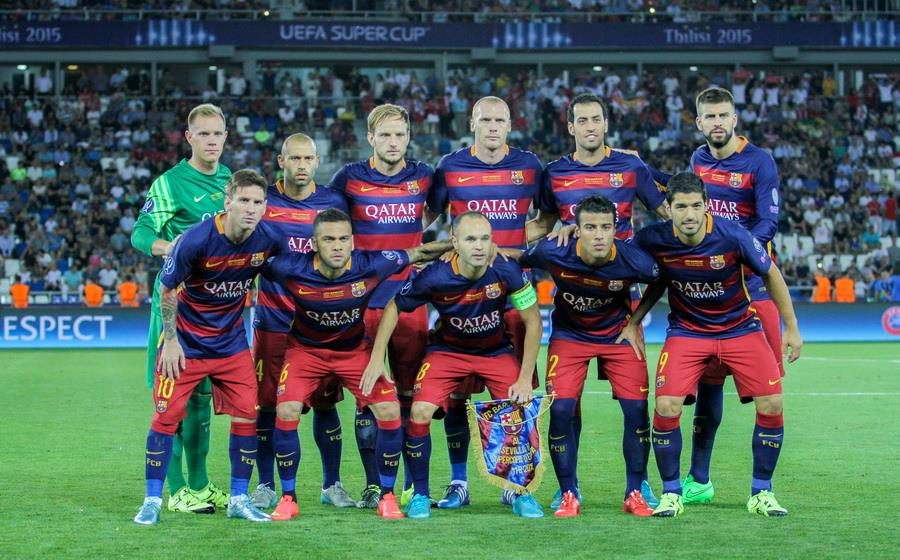
- Barcelona players lining up before the kick-off of the 2015 UEFA Super Cup
- President: Josep Maria Bartomeu
- Head coach: Luis Enrique
- Stadium: Camp Nou
- La Liga: 1st
- Copa del Rey: Winners
- Supercopa de España: Runners-up
- UEFA Champions League: Quarter-finals
- UEFA Super Cup: Winners
- FIFA Club World Cup: Winners
- Top goalscorer: League: Luis Suárez (40); All: Luis Suárez (59)
- Highest home attendance: 99,264 vs Real Madrid (2 April 2016)
- Lowest home attendance: 60,635 vs Valencia (3 February 2016)
- Average home league attendance: 80,266 (including Joan Gamper Trophy)
Home colours	Away colours	Third colours

The 2015–16 season was Futbol Club Barcelona's 117th in existence and the club's 85th consecutive season in the top flight of Spanish football. Barcelona was involved in six competitions after completing its second continental treble in the previous season.

The season produced a domestic double of La Liga and Copa del Rey wins, with Barça coming out on top in a closely fought title race and defeating newly crowned Europa League winners Sevilla in the Copa del Rey final after extra time. However, Barça failed to clinch its second sextuple after 2009 by losing the Supercopa de España to Copa del Rey runners-up Athletic Bilbao (0–4 away, 1–1 home). Barcelona did manage to finish the year with five trophies, repeating 2011, by clinching the UEFA Super Cup and FIFA Club World Cup titles. Barcelona was also aiming and considered a favourite to repeat as Champions League winners to become the first team in the modern era to do so, but they were knocked out by Atlético Madrid in the quarter-finals (2–1 home, 0–2 away) in a strange repeat of their meeting at the same stage two years prior.

The season was the first since 1997–98 without former captain Xavi, who departed to Al Sadd SC.

== Season overview ==
=== June ===
On 7 June, Barcelona announced the transfer of right-wing Aleix Vidal from fellow La Liga outfit and 2015 UEFA Europa League winners Sevilla. The player will join on a five-year deal with a transfer fee of €18 million plus variables. On 9 June, the club announced that right back Dani Alves is set to stay at the club after signing a contract renewal for two years with an option for another year. On 10 June, Barcelona announced that the presidential elections will take place on 18 July, after Josep Bartomeu resigned as president to qualify for re-election. On 25 June, Barcelona announced La Masia graduate Gerard Deulofeu was transferred to English side Everton for a reported fee of €6 million. The player returned to Merseyside after spending the 2013–14 season on loan there under fellow Spaniard manager Roberto Martínez.

=== July ===
On 3 July, Barcelona announced that La Masia graduate Martín Montoya would join Italian side Internazionale on a season-long loan with an option for a second. On 6 July, Barcelona announced the signing of Turkey national team captain Arda Turan from Atlético Madrid for €34 million. The player will join on 1 January 2016 after the FIFA transfer ban is lifted. On 18 July, Josep Bartomeu was elected president of Barcelona for the next six years with the third most votes in the club's history. On 21 July, Barcelona kicked off the preseason with a 1–2 victory over Major League Soccer champions LA Galaxy in the 2015 International Champions Cup. Goals from Luis Suárez and Sergi Roberto secured the win in front of a crowd of 93,226 at the Rose Bowl in Pasadena, California. On 23 July, Barcelona were fined €30,000 by UEFA for fans waving pro-Catalan independence banners at the 2015 UEFA Champions League Final. The club maintains its respect for the sanction, yet does not agree with it and its legal services will consider the possibility of questioning the fine at a later time. On 25 July, Barcelona were defeated by English side Manchester United with a scoreline of 1–3 at Levi's Stadium in Santa Clara, California. The lone goal came from Rafinha in the 89th minute of play. On 28 July, Barcelona were defeated in penalties by Chelsea at FedExField in Landover, Maryland. Goals from Luis Suárez and Sandro were enough to earn the regular time draw, however the team lost in penalties 4–2 to end their United States Summer Tour.

=== August ===
On 2 August, Barcelona finished their pre-season tour with a visit to Fiorentina at the Stadio Artemio Franchi in Florence. The match ended with a 2–1 loss to the Catalans, the lone Barça goal coming from Luis Suárez. Three days later, on 5 August, Barcelona took on Italian club Roma in the 50th edition of the annual Joan Gamper Trophy. The game ended 3–0 to the Catalan club with goals coming from Neymar, Lionel Messi and Ivan Rakitić. As a result of winning the 2014–15 UEFA Champions League the previous season, the team was eligible to compete in the 2015 UEFA Super Cup versus 2014–15 UEFA Europa League winner Sevilla. The game took place on 11 August at the Boris Paichadze Dinamo Arena in Tbilisi, Georgia, and ended 5–4 in favour of Barcelona, with a brace from Messi and Pedro scoring the winner in extra time. With the win, Barcelona becomes the club with the most international trophies in Europe with 19 international titles.

On 12 August, UEFA announced Messi, Suárez and Real Madrid's Cristiano Ronaldo as the finalists for the 2014–15 UEFA Best Player in Europe Award. On 14 August, Barcelona were soundly defeated by Athletic Bilbao 4–0 in the first leg of the 2015 Supercopa de España at the San Mamés Stadium. On 17 August, Barcelona failed to win their second trophy of the season after a 1–1 draw in the second leg of 2015 Supercopa de España. The lone goal from Messi was not enough to overturn a four-goal deficit from the first leg.

On 20 August, Pedro joined Premier League champions Chelsea for €27 million, rising to €30 million on variables, ending his 11-year association with Barcelona. On 23 August, Barcelona kicked off the 2015–16 La Liga season with a 0–1 victory over Athletic Bilbao in Bilbao. This was the third meeting between the two teams in the last nine days that included the two legs of the 2015 Supercopa de España. On 27 August, Barcelona were drawn into Group E of the 2015–16 UEFA Champions League with Bundesliga side Bayer Leverkusen, Roma and Belarusian champions BATE Borisov. At the same event, Messi was crowned the 2014–15 UEFA Best Player in Europe for the second time in his career. On 29 August, Barcelona played their first match at home against Málaga which ended in a 1–0 victory. Thomas Vermaelen scored the only and his first goal for the club.

=== September ===
On 1 September, Barcelona and English side West Ham United agreed on the loan of Alex Song for a second successive season. On 13 September, Barcelona traveled to the Vicente Calderón Stadium to face Atlético Madrid after the FIFA international break. The host took the lead with a goal from Fernando Torres, but goals from Neymar and substitute Messi completed the comeback and notched a 1–2 victory. Barcelona goalkeeper Marc-André ter Stegen made his La Liga debut after only appearing in the Champions League and Copa del Rey last season. On 16 September, Barcelona open their European campaign with a 1–1 draw against Roma at the Stadio Olimpico, with the goal coming from Luis Suárez in the first half. The match ended on a sour note for the squad after Rafinha left the pitch on a stretcher with a leg injury after a tackle from Roma midfielder Radja Nainggolan. The next day, the team released a statement that the player had tear the right anterior cruciate ligament (ACL) and is likely to miss the rest of the season.

On 20 September, Barcelona defeated Levante at home by a 4–1 scoreline with a brace from Messi to stay undefeated in league. Three days later in Balaídos in Vigo, Barça were soundly defeated 4–1 by Celta de Vigo to suffer their first league defeat and drop out of first place in the table. On 26 September, Barcelona were able to bounce back at home with a 2–1 victory over newly promoted Las Palmas. The match was marred with the costly injury to Messi, who suffered a tear in the medial collateral ligament (MCL) of his left knee. The injury will keep the star player out for approximately 6–8 weeks.

On 29 September, Barcelona defeated Bayer Leverkusen in come from behind fashion with a 2–1 victory. The visitors took the lead in the 22nd minute with a corner kick goal from defender Kyriakos Papadopoulos. In the 80th minute, Sergi Roberto leveled the score and two minutes later, Suárez completed the comeback to keep Barça at the top of Group E. For the second straight Champions League match, Barça lose a key player to injury. This time, captain Andrés Iniesta went down with a hamstring injury in his right leg that will keep him out 3–4 weeks.

=== October ===
On 3 October, Barcelona was defeated by Sevilla 2–1 away at the Ramón Sánchez Pizjuán Stadium for the club's second loss in last three league games. Neymar scored from a second-half penalty kick as Unai Emery beat Barcelona for first ever time as a manager.

=== November ===
On 21 November, Barcelona thrashed Real Madrid 0–4 in the season's first Clásico, played at the Santiago Bernabeu Stadium. Luis Suárez scored a brace while Neymar and Andrés Iniesta also got in the scoresheet; later, Lionel Messi played his first match as a substitute after recovering from his two-month injury. On 24 November, Barcelona beat Roma 6–1 in the Champions League and secured top spot in Group E.

=== December ===
On 14 December, in the draw for the round of 16 of Champions League, Barcelona will face Arsenal as the Group E winner. On 20 December, the club won a record third FIFA Club World Cup title after defeating Argentine side River Plate 3–0 in the final. Luis Suárez scored a record five goals in the tournament including two goals in the final and a hat trick in the semi-final. He was awarded the Adidas Golden ball, given to the best player of the tournament.

On 30 December, Barcelona beat Real Betis 4–0, with Suárez netting a second-half double after Lionel Messi, in his 500th game, scored; Betis also scored an own goal. By scoring 180 goals in 2015 in all competitions, Barcelona set the record for most goals scored in a calendar year, breaking Real Madrid's record of 178 goals scored in 2014.

=== January ===
On 11 January 2016, Messi won the FIFA Ballon d'Or for a record fifth time in his career. Luis Enrique's Barcelona has finished a January with nearly perfect statistics. Just the draw against Espanyol at the Cornellà-El Prat in the first game of the year has held them back in 2016.

=== February ===
On 10 February, Barcelona's Copa del Rey draw with Valencia saw Luis Enrique's side set a new club record for unbeaten games, beating Pep Guardiola's 2011 vintage with their 29th game without a loss. On 17 February, Messi made more history after scoring his 300th and 301st goal in La Liga, becoming the first player ever to do so. In the same match, Luis Suárez made up for a penalty miss with his 24th league goal of the season as Barça beat Sporting de Gijón 3–1. On 23 February, Barcelona defeated Arsenal 0–2 away in London, with Messi scoring twice in a feverishly paced encounter, including the 10,000th goal scored in club history. On 25 February, Barcelona extend their alliance with UNICEF through to 2020; the club will increase its annual donation to the charity from €1.5 million to €2 million.

=== March ===
On 3 March, Barcelona defeated Rayo Vallecano away 1–5, with Ivan Rakitić and Arda Turan netting one each and Messi scoring a hat-trick. Barça set an all-time record run for 35 games unbeaten in Spanish football, previously held by Real Madrid's 1988–89 side managed by Dutchman Leo Beenhakker. On 8 March, the club announced that the Espai Barça jury unanimously selected the bid by Nikken Sekkei + Pascual i Ausió Arquitectes as the winner of the tender for the design of the new Camp Nou.

On 16 March, Barça defeated Arsenal 3–1 at home (5–1 aggregate) in the round of 16 of the Champions League to gain access to the competition's quarter-finals for the ninth-straight season, and set a new club record for ten consecutive Champions League wins at Camp Nou. On 18 March, in the draw for the quarter-finals of Champions League, Barcelona will face Atlético Madrid. On 24 March, legendary Barcelona player and coach Johan Cruyff died of illness at 68, surrounded by his family in Barcelona; the club mourned him with flags at Camp Nou placed at half-mast.

=== April ===
On 2 April, Real Madrid won the second El Clásico match of the league season with a 1–2 victory away, breaking Barcelona's unbeaten record at 39 matches. Players, directors and supporters remembered Johan Cruyff in the form of a video, a mosaic, a minute's silence and applause before the game. On 5 April, Barcelona defeated Atlético Madrid at home (2–1) in the first leg of their Champions League draw, after Luis Suárez's two goals in the second half reversed Barça's early one-goal deficit.

Barcelona lost 1–0 away at the Anoeta Stadium to Real Sociedad on 9 April in La Liga after a goal from the latter club early on. On 13 April, Atlético defeated Barcelona 2–0 (3–2 on aggregate) in the second leg of the Champions League quarter-finals, eliminating the title holders. On 17 April, Barcelona suffered their third consecutive loss of the competition as they were out-played by Valencia in a 1–2 home defeat, despite Messi's second-half goal, his 450th for the club.

On 20 April, Barcelona shook off their recent poor form to absolutely thump Deportivo de La Coruña in a 0–8 away victory, with Luis Suárez scoring four and creating three assists to keep his side in the title race. They continued this form three days later by beating Sporting de Gijón 6–0, with Suárez again scoring four goals (two from penalties), with Messi and Neymar scoring the other two. On 30 April, Barcelona defeated Real Betis 0–2 through Ivan Rakitić and Suárez goals, keeping Barça top of La Liga.

=== May ===
On 8 May, Barcelona thrashed Espanyol 5–0 in the season's last home match. Everyone inside Camp Nou played their part in the spectacular pre-game mosaic which bore the message "Som-hi tots" ("Let's go everyone") and also in the minute's silence in memory of the recently passed Manel Vich, the voice of Camp Nou for almost 60 years. On 14 May 2016, Barcelona sealed their sixth La Liga title in eight years with an emphatic 0–3 win over Granada. Two strikes from Luis Suárez in the first half and another late in the second helped the Catalans achieve the club's 24th league success, and confirms the Uruguayan's status as the division's top marksman with 40 goals.

On 21 May, Barcelona and Nike extended their current sponsorship deal. On 22 May, Barcelona recorded a 2–0 extra time victory over Sevilla for their second domestic title of the season and 28th Copa del Rey of all-time. On 27 May, Barcelona and Sergio Busquets are set to renew his contract for five seasons, through to 30 June 2021.

=== Origin ===
Josep Maria Bartomeu reviewed his time in office before an audience of about 250 club directors, commission members, guests, members and supporters of the club's peñas at the Auditori 1899. The board was to resign at an extraordinary meeting so that a caretaker commission could call elections. The commission was to be chaired by Ramon Adell, president of the club's economic commission, and include the commission's other members, the Síndic del Soci Joan Manuel Trayter, outgoing economic vice president Javier Faus, and two further board members.

== Players ==
=== Squad information ===
N	Pos.	Nat.	Name	Age	EU	Since	App	Goals	Ends	Transfer fee	Notes
1	GK	(Germany)	Marc-André ter Stegen	24	EU	2014	45	0	2019	€10M	
2	RB	(Brazil)	Douglas	25	Non-EU	2014	7	0	2019	Free	
3	CB	(Spain)	Gerard Pique	29	EU	2008	345	31	2019	€4.98M	Originally from Youth system
4	MF	(Croatia)	Ivan Rakitić	28	EU	2014	104	16	2019	€17.8M	
5	MF	(Spain)	Sergio Busquets	27	EU	2008	372	12	2019	YS	
6	RB	(Brazil)	Dani Alves	33	EU	2008	391	21	2017	€35M	Second nationality: Spain
7	MF	(Turkey)	Arda Turan	29	Non-EU	2015	13	2	2020	€28.70M	
8	MF	(Spain)	Andrés Iniesta (captain)	32	EU	2002	591	54	2018	YS	
9	FW	(Uruguay)	Luis Suárez	29	Non-EU	2014	96	84	2019	€81M	Second nationality: Italy
10	FW	(Argentina)	Lionel Messi (vice-captain)	28	EU	2004	531	453	2018	YS	Second nationality: Spain
11	FW	(Brazil)	Neymar	24	Non-EU	2013	141	85	2018	€86M	
12	MF	(Brazil)	Rafinha	23	EU	2011	45	3	2020	YS	Second nationality: Spain
13	GK	(Chile)	Claudio Bravo	33	EU	2014	64	0	2018	€18M	Second nationality: Spain
14	CB	(Argentina)	Javier Mascherano (4th captain)	31	EU	2010	270	0	2018	€21.8M	Second nationality: Italy
15	CB	(Spain)	Marc Bartra	25	EU	2010	97	5	2017	YS	
17	FW	(Morocco)	Munir	20	EU	2014	38	7	2017	YS	
18	LB	(Spain)	Jordi Alba	27	EU	2012	145	7	2020	€14.8M	Originally from Youth system
19	FW	(Spain)	Sandro	20	EU	2014	31	7	2017	YS	
20	MF	(Spain)	Sergi Roberto	24	EU	2012	94	5	2019	YS	
21	LB	(Brazil)	Adriano	31	EU	2010	185	17	2017	€1.76M	Second nationality: Spain
22	RB	(Spain)	Aleix Vidal	26	EU	2015	13	0	2020	€16.7M	Originally from Youth system
23	CB	(Belgium)	Thomas Vermaelen	30	EU	2014	19	1	2019	€15M	
24	CB	(France)	Jérémy Mathieu	32	EU	2014	69	3	2018	€18M	
25	GK	(Spain)	Jordi Masip	27	EU	2014	4	0	2017	YS	

- Last updated: 22 May 2016
- Source: FCBarcelona.com, Champions League 2015/16 numbers, Players in / out, Wikipedia players' articles, ESPN (for appearances and goals) and footballdatabase.com (for EU passport)

==== From youth squad ====
Note: Flags indicate national team as defined under FIFA eligibility rules; some limited exceptions apply. Players may hold more than one non-FIFA nationality.

No.	Pos.	Nation	Player
26	MF	ESP	Sergi Samper
27	MF	ESP	Juan Cámara
28	MF	ESP	Gerard Gumbau
33	FW	ESP	Aitor Cantalapiedra
34	MF	CMR	Wilfrid Kaptoum
36	FW	ESP	Dani Romera
37	MF	ESP	Carles Aleñá

=== Players In ===
No.	Pos.	Nat.	Name	Age	EU	Moving from	Type	Transfer window	Ends	Transfer fee	Source
19	MF	(Netherlands)	Ibrahim Afellay	29	EU	(Greece) Olympiacos	Loan return	Summer	2015	Free	
17	MF	(Cameroon)	Alex Song	27	EU	(England) West Ham United	Loan return	Summer	2017	Free	
22	DF	(Spain)	Aleix Vidal	25	EU	Sevilla	Transfer	Summer	2020	€18M+4M variables	FCBarcelona.com
7	MF	(Turkey)	Arda Turan	28	Non-EU	Atlético Madrid	Transfer	Summer	2020	€34M+7M variables	FCBarcelona.com
–	MF	(Spain)	Denis Suárez	21	EU	Sevilla	Loan return	Summer	2015	Free	
–	FW	(Spain)	Cristian Tello	24	EU	(Portugal) Porto	Loan return	Winter	2016	Free	
–	DF	(Spain)	Martín Montoya	24	EU	(Italy) Internazionale	Loan return	Winter	2016	Free	

Total spending: ▼€52 million

=== Players Out ===
No.	Pos.	Nat.	Name	Age	EU	Moving to	Type	Transfer window	Transfer fee	Source
6	MF	(Spain)	Xavi	35	EU	(Qatar) Al-Sadd	End of contract	Summer	Free	FCBarcelona.com
–	FW	(Spain)	Gerard Deulofeu	21	EU	(England) Everton	Transfer	Summer	€6M	FCBarcelona.com
2	DF	(Spain)	Martín Montoya	24	EU	(Italy) Internazionale	Loan	Summer	€1M	FCBarcelona.com
19	FW	(Netherlands)	Ibrahim Afellay	29	EU	(England) Stoke City	End of contract	Summer	Free	Stoke City FC
7	FW	(Spain)	Pedro	28	EU	(England) Chelsea	Transfer	Summer	€27M+3M variables	FCBarcelona.com
30	MF	(Croatia)	Alen Halilović	19	EU	Sporting Gijón	Loan	Summer	Free	FCBarcelona.com
–	MF	(Spain)	Denis Suárez	21	EU	Villarreal	Transfer	Summer	€4M	FCBarcelona.com
17	MF	(Cameroon)	Alex Song	27	EU	(England) West Ham United	Loan	Summer	N/A	FCB, WHU
27	FW	(Spain)	Adama Traoré	19	EU	(England) Aston Villa	Transfer	Summer	€10M+€2M variables	FCBarcelona.com
–	FW	(Spain)	Cristian Tello	24	EU	(Italy) Fiorentina	Loan	Winter	N/A	FCBarcelona.com

Total income: ▲€48 million

Total expenditure: ▼€4 million

== Technical staff ==
Position	Staff
First team head coach	Luis Enrique
Assistant coach	Juan Carlos Unzué; Robert Moreno
Technical assistant	Roberto Moreno
Auxiliary coach	Joan Barbarà
Fitness coach	Rafa Pol
Goalkeeping coach	José Ramón de la Fuente
Scoutings	Àlex García; Jordi Melero; Jaume Torras
Physiotherapist	Jaume Minull; Juanjo Brau; Roger Gironès; Xavi Linde
Psychologist	Joaquín Valdés
Doctor	Ricard Pruna; Daniel Medina
Team liaison	Carles Naval
Football Area Technical Commission	Jordi Mestre; Javier Borda; Carles Rexach; Ariedo Braida
Academy director	Jordi Roura
B team coach	Gerard López

Last updated: 26 August 2015
Source: FC Barcelona First Team, FC Barcelona B Team, Luis Enrique's full staff, Football Area Technical Commission

== Statistics ==
=== Squad, appearances and goals ===
Last updated on 22 May 2016.

No.	Pos	Nat	Player	Total		La Liga		Champions League		Copa del Rey		Supercopa		UEFA Super Cup		FIFA Club World Cup	
No.	Pos	Nat	Player	Apps	Goals	Apps	Goals	Apps	Goals	Apps	Goals	Apps	Goals	Apps	Goals	Apps	Goals
Goalkeepers
1	GK	(Germany) GER	Marc-André ter Stegen	26	0	6+1	0	10	0	7	0	1	0	1	0	0	0
13	GK	(Chile) CHI	Claudio Bravo	35	0	32	0	0	0	0	0	1	0	0	0	2	0
25	GK	(Spain) ESP	Jordi Masip	2	0	0	0	0	0	2	0	0	0	0	0	0	0
Defenders
2	DF	(Brazil) BRA	Douglas	3	0	0+1	0	0	0	1+1	0	0	0	0	0	0	0
3	DF	(Spain) ESP	Gerard Piqué	46	5	30	2	7	1	5	2	1	0	1	0	2	0
6	DF	(Brazil) BRA	Dani Alves	48	1	24+5	0	8	0	6	1	2	0	1	0	2	0
14	DF	(Argentina) ARG	Javier Mascherano	51	0	31+1	0	7+1	0	6	0	2	0	1	0	2	0
15	DF	(Spain) ESP	Marc Bartra	22	2	4+9	2	2	0	3+2	0	1	0	0+1	0	0	0
18	DF	(Spain) ESP	Jordi Alba	45	1	29+2	0	8+1	0	3	1	0	0	0	0	2	0
20	DF	(Spain) ESP	Sergi Roberto	49	1	21+10	0	4+4	1	4+2	0	1	0	0+1	0	1+1	0
21	DF	(Brazil) BRA	Adriano	19	1	4+4	0	2+1	1	3+3	0	1	0	0	0	0+1	0
22	DF	(Spain) ESP	Aleix Vidal	14	0	6+3	0	0	0	3+2	0	0	0	0	0	0	0
23	DF	(Belgium) BEL	Thomas Vermaelen	20	1	6+4	1	3	0	5	0	1	0	0	0	0+1	0
24	DF	(France) FRA	Jérémy Mathieu	34	0	12+9	0	3	0	6+1	0	1	0	1	0	0+1	0
Midfielders
4	MF	(Croatia) CRO	Ivan Rakitić	57	9	30+6	7	9+1	2	5+1	0	1+1	0	1	0	2	0
5	MF	(Spain) ESP	Sergio Busquets	53	0	34+1	0	9	0	4+1	0	1	0	1	0	2	0
7	MF	(Turkey) TUR	Arda Turan	25	2	9+9	2	0+3	0	4	0	0	0	0	0	0	0
8	MF	(Spain) ESP	Andrés Iniesta	44	1	25+3	1	7	0	4	0	1+1	0	1	0	2	0
12	MF	(Brazil) BRA	Rafinha	11	2	3+3	1	0+2	0	0+1	0	1	0	1	1	0	0
26	MF	(Spain) ESP	Sergi Samper	7	0	0+1	0	1+1	0	3	0	0	0	0	0	0+1	0
28	MF	(Spain) ESP	Gerard Gumbau	8	0	0+3	0	0+3	0	1+1	0	0	0	0	0	0	0
34	MF	(Cameroon) CMR	Wilfrid Kaptoum	3	1	0	0	1	0	1+1	1	0	0	0	0	0	0
Forwards
9	FW	(Uruguay) URU	Luis Suárez	53	59	35	40	9	8	4	5	2	0	1	1	2	5
10	FW	(Argentina) ARG	Lionel Messi	49	41	31+2	26	7	6	5	5	2	1	1	2	1	1
11	FW	(Brazil) BRA	Neymar	49	31	34	24	9	3	5	4	0	0	0	0	1	0
17	FW	(Morocco) MAR	Munir El Haddadi	25	8	8+7	3	2+2	0	3+1	5	0+1	0	0	0	1	0
19	FW	(Spain) ESP	Sandro Ramírez	25	3	10+4	0	2+1	0	5	3	0+2	0	0	0	0+1	0
27	FW	(Spain) ESP	Juan Cámara	2	0	0	0	0+1	0	0+1	0	0	0	0	0	0	0
33	FW	(Spain) ESP	Aitor	2	0	0	0	0	0	1+1	0	0	0	0	0	0	0
Players who have made an appearance or had a squad number this season but have left the club
7	FW	(Spain) ESP	Pedro	3	1	0	0	0	0	0	0	2	0	0+1	1	0	0

=== Goalscorers ===
No.	Pos.	Nation	Name	La Liga	Champions League	Copa del Rey	UEFA Super Cup	Supercopa de España	Club World Cup	Total
9	FW	(Uruguay)	Suárez	40	8	5	1	0	5	59
10	FW	(Argentina)	Messi	26	6	5	2	1	1	41
11	FW	(Brazil)	Neymar Jr	24	3	4	0	0	0	31
4	MF	(Croatia)	I. Rakitić	7	2	0	0	0	0	9
17	FW	(Morocco)	Munir	3	0	5	0	0	0	8
3	DF	(Spain)	Piqué	2	1	2	0	0	0	5
19	FW	(Spain)	Sandro	0	0	3	0	0	0	3
7	MF	(Turkey)	A. Turan	2	0	0	0	0	0	2
15	DF	(Spain)	Bartra	2	0	0	0	0	0	2
12	MF	(Brazil)	Rafinha	1	1	0	1	0	0	2
6	DF	(Brazil)	Alves	0	0	1	0	0	0	1
8	MF	(Spain)	Iniesta	1	0	0	0	0	0	1
18	DF	(Spain)	Alba	0	0	1	0	0	0	1
20	MF	(Spain)	S. Roberto	0	1	0	0	0	0	1
21	DF	(Brazil)	Adriano	0	1	0	0	0	0	1
23	DF	(Belgium)	Vermaelen	1	0	0	0	0	0	1
34	MF	(Cameroon)	Kaptoum	0	0	1	0	0	0	1
~~7~~	FW	(Spain)	Pedro	0	0	0	1	0	0	1
#	Own goals			3	0	0	0	0	0	3
TOTAL				112	22	27	5	1	6	173

Last updated: 23 May 2016

=== Disciplinary record ===
Includes all competitive matches. Players listed below made at least one appearance for Barcelona first squad during the season.

N	P	Nat.	Name	La Liga			Champions League			Copa del Rey			UEFA Super Cup			Supercopa de España			FIFA Club World Cup			Total			Notes
N	P	Nat.	Name	Yellow card	Second yellow card	Red card	Yellow card	Second yellow card	Red card	Yellow card	Second yellow card	Red card	Yellow card	Second yellow card	Red card	Yellow card	Second yellow card	Red card	Yellow card	Second yellow card	Red card	Yellow card	Second yellow card	Red card	Notes
3	CB	(Spain)	Piqué	12			3			2								1				17		1	Ban sustained - 4 Games(Spain) for insulting the referee; Banned on 17 August 2015 - Returned on 23 September 2015
4	MF	(Croatia)	I. Rakitić	3			1												1			5			
5	MF	(Spain)	Sergio	6			2						1									9			
6	RB	(Brazil)	Dani Alves	6			3			2			1			1						13			
7	MF	(Turkey)	Arda Turan	5			2			1												8			Ban sustained - Couldn't play, due to FIFA transef ban for FCB; Banned on 7 May 2015 - Returned on 4 January 2016
8	MF	(Spain)	A. Iniesta	2			1			3						1						7			
9	FW	(Uruguay)	Suárez	6			2			2						1						11			
10	FW	(Argentina)	Messi	3			1			1												5			
11	FW	(Brazil)	Neymar	6			2			2									1			11			
14	CB	(Argentina)	Mascherano	9		1	2			2		1				1						14		2	Ban sustained - 2 Games(Spain) for insulting the referee; Banned on 25 October 2015 - Returned on 8 November 2015
15	DF	(Spain)	Bartra	1			1															2			
17	FW	(Spain)	Munir							1												1			
18	LB	(Spain)	Jordi Alba	2			1			1									1			5			
20	MF	(Spain)	S.Roberto	1															1			2			
22	DF	(Spain)	Aleix Vidal	1																		1			Ban sustained - Couldn't play, due to FIFA transef ban for FCB; Banned on 7 May 2015 - Returned on 4 January 2016
23	CB	(Belgium)	Vermaelen	2																		2			
24	CB	(France)	Mathieu	2									1									3			
26	MF	(Spain)	Samper							1												1			
28	MF	(Spain)	Gumbau				2			1												3			
–	FW	(Spain)	Pedro										1			2						3			

Last updated: 23 May 2016
Source: ESPNFC.com, FCBarcelona.com
Only competitive matches
(yellow card) = Number of bookings; (second yellow card) = Number of sending offs after a second yellow card; (red card) = Number of sending offs by a direct red card.

== Pre-season and friendlies ==
Win Draw Loss

21 July 2015 1	Barcelona	2–1	LA Galaxy	Pasadena, United States
20:00 PDT	Suárez 45'; Roberto 56'	Report	Leonardo (yellow card) 41'; Meyer 90+1'	Stadium: Rose Bowl; Attendance: 93,226; Referee: Ismail Elfath (United States)

25 July 2015 2	Barcelona	1–3	Manchester United	Santa Clara, United States
13:00 PDT	Rafinha 89'	Report	Rooney 8'; Jones (yellow card) 49'; Lingard 65'; Herrera (yellow card) 76'; Januzaj 90'	Stadium: Levi's Stadium; Attendance: 68,416; Referee: Baldomero Toledo (United States)

28 July 2015 3	Chelsea	2–2 (4–2 p)	Barcelona	Landover, United States
20:00 EDT	Hazard 10'; Cahill 86'	Report	Mathieu (yellow card) 42'; Suárez 52'; Sandro 66'; Alba (yellow card) 74'	Stadium: FedExField; Attendance: 78,914; Referee: Allen Chapman (United States)
	Penalties
	Falcao (penalty scored); Moses (penalty scored); Ramires (penalty scored); Rémy (penalty scored)		(penalty scored) Iniesta; (penalty missed) Halilović; (penalty missed) Piqué; (penalty scored) Sandro

2 August 2015 4	Fiorentina	2–1	Barcelona	Florence, Italy
21:00 CEST	Bernardeschi 4', 12'	Report	Suárez 17'	Stadium: Artemio Franchi; Attendance: 29,421; Referee: Massimiliano Irrati (Italy)

5 August 2015 5	Barcelona	3–0	Roma	Barcelona, Spain
22:00 CEST	Neymar 26'; Messi (yellow card) 34', (goal) 41'; Rakitić 66'; Bartra (yellow card) 90'	Report	Yanga-Mbiwa (yellow card) 34'; Florenzi (yellow card) 37'; Nainggolan (yellow card) 40'	Stadium: Camp Nou; Attendance: 94,422; Referee: Estrada Fernández (Catalonia)

== Competitions ==
=== La Liga ===
==== League table ====
Pos	Team	Pld	W	D	L	GF	GA	GD	Pts	Qualification or relegation
1	Barcelona (C)	38	29	4	5	112	29	+83	91	Qualification for the Champions League group stage
2	Real Madrid	38	28	6	4	110	34	+76	90	Qualification for the Champions League group stage
3	Atlético Madrid	38	28	4	6	63	18	+45	88	Qualification for the Champions League group stage
4	Villarreal	38	18	10	10	44	35	+9	64	Qualification for the Champions League play-off round
5	Athletic Bilbao	38	18	8	12	58	45	+13	62	Qualification for the Europa League group stage (Note: Since the winners of the 2015–16 Copa del Rey, Barcelona, qualified for European competition based on league position, the spot awarded to the cup winners (Europa League group stage) was passed to the sixth-placed team and the spot awarded to the sixth-placed team (Europa League third qualifying round) was passed to the seventh-placed team.)

Source: La Liga, Soccerway
Rules for classification: 1) Points; 2) Head-to-head points; 3) Head-to-head goal difference; 4) Goal difference; 5) Goals scored; 6) Fair-play points; 7) Play-off.
(C) Champions

==== Results by round ====
Round	1	2	3	4	5	6	7	8	9	10	11	12	13	14	15	16	17	18	19	20	21	22	23	24	25	26	27	28	29	30	31	32	33	34	35	36	37	38
Ground	A	H	A	H	A	H	A	H	H	A	H	A	H	A	H	A	H	A	H	H	A	H	A	H	A	H	A	A	H	A	H	A	H	A	H	A	H	A
Result	W	W	W	W	L	W	L	W	W	W	W	W	W	D	D	W	W	D	W	W	W	W	W	W	W	W	W	W	W	D	L	L	L	W	W	W	W	W
Position	5	4	1	1	5	2	4	3	2	2	1	1	1	1	1	1	1	2	2	2	1	1	1	1	1	1	1	1	1	1	1	1	1	1	1	1	1	1

Updated to match(es) played on 14 May 2016. Source: Competitive matches
A = Away; H = Home; W = Win; D = Draw; L = Loss

==== Matches ====
23 August 2015 1	Athletic Bilbao	0–1	Barcelona	Bilbao
18:30 CEST (UTC+02:00)	Elustondo (yellow card) 34'; Eraso (yellow card) 37'; Ibai (yellow card) 71'	Report	Rakitić (yellow card) 44'; Suárez 54', (yellow card) 75'; Vermaelen (yellow card) 64'	Stadium: San Mamés; Attendance: 41,000; Referee: Carlos del Cerro Grande (Community of Madrid)

29 August 2015 2	Barcelona	1–0	Málaga	Barcelona
20:30 CEST (UTC+02:00)	Vermaelen 73'	Report	Recio (yellow card) 43'; Tissone (yellow card) 89'; Torres (yellow card) 90+1'	Stadium: Camp Nou; Attendance: 80,812; Referee: Santiago Jaime Latre (Aragon)

12 September 2015 3	Atlético Madrid	1–2	Barcelona	Madrid
20:30 CEST (UTC+02:00)	Ó. Torres (yellow card) 18'; Filipe Luís (yellow card) 43'; F. Torres 51'; Giménez (yellow card) 89'	Report	Iniesta (yellow card) 44'; Neymar 55'; Messi 77'	Stadium: Vicente Calderón; Attendance: 53,491; Referee: Antonio Mateu Lahoz (Valencian Community)

20 September 2015 4	Barcelona	4–1	Levante	Barcelona
20:30 CEST (UTC+02:00)	Bartra 50'; Neymar 56'; Messi 61' (pen.), 90'	Report	Verza (yellow card) 45'; Víctor 66'	Stadium: Camp Nou; Attendance: 76,013; Referee: David Fernández Borbalán (Andalusia)

23 September 2015 5	Celta Vigo	4–1	Barcelona	Vigo
20:00 CEST (UTC+02:00)	Nolito 26'; Aspas 30', 56'; Mallo (yellow card) 79'; Guidetti 83'; Gómez (yellow card) 90'	Report	Busquets (yellow card) 23'; Neymar 80', (yellow card) 89'	Stadium: Balaídos; Attendance: 23,311; Referee: Alberto Undiano Mallenco (Navarre)

26 September 2015 6	Barcelona	2–1	Las Palmas	Barcelona
16:00 CEST (UTC+02:00)	Suárez 25', 54', (yellow card) 90+2'; Mascherano (yellow card) 79'	Report	Hernán (yellow card) 36'; David Simón (yellow card) 56'; Wakaso (yellow card) 58'; Alcaraz (yellow card) 66'; Viera 88'	Stadium: Camp Nou; Attendance: 74,916; Referee: Ricardo de Burgos Bengoetxea (Basque Country)

3 October 2015 7	Sevilla	2–1	Barcelona	Seville
16:00 CEST (UTC+02:00)	Krychowiak (yellow card) 19'; Andreolli (yellow card) 22'; Kolodziejczak (yellow card) 33'; Krohn-Dehli 52'; Iborra 58'; Trémoulinas (yellow card) 73'; Llorente (yellow card) 75'	Report	Busquets (yellow card) 28'; Mathieu (yellow card) 48'; Alba (yellow card) 60'; Neymar 74' (pen.)	Stadium: Ramón Sánchez Pizjuán; Attendance: 39,374; Referee: Jesús Gil Manzano (Extremadura)

18 October 2015 8	Barcelona	5–2	Rayo Vallecano	Barcelona
20:30 CEST (UTC+02:00)	Neymar 22' (pen.), 32' (pen.), 69', 70'; Suárez 77'; Piqué (yellow card) 79'	Report	Guerra 15'; Llorente (yellow card) 21'; Dorado (yellow card) 47'; Jozabed 86'	Stadium: Camp Nou; Attendance: 75,472; Referee: Pedro Jesús Pérez Montero (Andalusia)

25 October 2015 9	Barcelona	3–1	Eibar	Barcelona
18:15 CET (UTC+01:00)	Suárez 21', 48', 85'; Rakitić (yellow card) 50'; Mascherano (red card) 83'; Piqué (yellow card) 90+1'; Neymar (yellow card) 90+2'	Report	Borja 10'; Escalante (yellow card) 60'; Juncà (yellow card) 67'; Pantić (yellow card) 82'; Capa (yellow card) 90+2'; Eddy (yellow card) 90+3'	Stadium: Camp Nou; Attendance: 78,228; Referee: Carlos del Cerro Grande (Community of Madrid)

31 October 2015 10	Getafe	0–2	Barcelona	Getafe
20:30 CET (UTC+01:00)	Alexis (yellow card) 39'; J. Rodríguez (yellow card) 43'; D. Suárez (yellow card) 47'	Report	L. Suárez 37'; Neymar 58'	Stadium: Coliseum Alfonso Pérez; Attendance: 10,089; Referee: Juan Martínez Munuera (Valencian Community)

8 November 2015 11	Barcelona	3–0	Villarreal	Barcelona
16:00 CET (UTC+01:00)	Mathieu (yellow card) 27'; Iniesta (yellow card) 37'; Neymar (yellow card) 47', (goal) 60', 85'; Suárez (yellow card) 47', (goal) 70' (pen.); Piqué (yellow card) 64'	Report	Mario (yellow card) 39'; Costa (yellow card) 69'; Bonera (yellow card) 72'	Stadium: Camp Nou; Attendance: 72,109; Referee: Carlos Clos Gómez (Aragon)

21 November 2015 12	Real Madrid	0–4	Barcelona	Madrid
18:15 CET (UTC+01:00)	Rodríguez (yellow card) 23'; Ramos (yellow card) 51'; Carvajal (yellow card) 83'; Isco (red card) 84'	Report	Suárez 11', 74'; Dani Alves (yellow card) 31'; Neymar 39'; Iniesta 53'; Busquets (yellow card) 90+2'	Stadium: Santiago Bernabéu; Attendance: 80,148; Referee: David Fernández Borbalán (Andalusia)

28 November 2015 13	Barcelona	4–0	Real Sociedad	Barcelona
16:00 CET (UTC+01:00)	Neymar 22', 53'; Suárez 41'; Messi 90+1'	Report	Berchiche (yellow card) 27'; Granero (yellow card) 37'; Canales (yellow card) 48'; Pardo (yellow card) 50'; Elustondo (yellow card) 56'	Stadium: Camp Nou; Attendance: 74,020; Referee: Ignacio Iglesias Villanueva (Galicia)

5 December 2015 14	Valencia	1–1	Barcelona	Valencia
20:30 CET (UTC+01:00)	Parejo (yellow card) 70'; Danilo (yellow card) 77'; Mina 86'; Gayà (yellow card) 87'	Report	Mascherano (yellow card) 16'; Suárez 59'	Stadium: Mestalla; Attendance: 46,799; Referee: Santiago Jaime Latre (Aragon)

12 December 2015 15	Barcelona	2–2	Deportivo La Coruña	Barcelona
16:00 CET (UTC+01:00)	Messi 39'; Rakitić 62'	Report	Luisinho (yellow card) 41'; Laure (yellow card) 72'; Lucas 77'; Bergantiños 86'	Stadium: Camp Nou; Attendance: 67,194; Referee: José María Sánchez Martínez (Murcia)

30 December 2015 17	Barcelona	4–0	Real Betis	Barcelona
20:30 CET (UTC+01:00)	Westermann 29' (o.g.); Messi 33'; Suárez 46', 83'; Dani Alves (yellow card) 77'	Report	Adán (yellow card) 27'; Petros (yellow card) 30'; Pezzella (yellow card) 68'	Stadium: Camp Nou; Attendance: 83,630; Referee: Iñaki Vicandi Garrido (Basque Country)

2 January 2016 18	Espanyol	0–0	Barcelona	Cornellà de Llobregat
16:00 CET (UTC+01:00)	Álvaro (yellow card) 22'; J. López (yellow card) 31'; Jordán (yellow card) 42'; Álvarez (yellow card) 60'; Diop (yellow card) 89'	Report	Mascherano (yellow card) 22'; Neymar (yellow card) 86'; Piqué (yellow card) 90'	Stadium: Cornellà-El Prat; Attendance: 28,975; Referee: José Luis González González (Castile and León)

9 January 2016 19	Barcelona	4–0	Granada	Barcelona
16:00 CET (UTC+01:00)	Messi 8', 14', 58'; Vidal (yellow card) 63'; Neymar 83'	Report	Rochina (yellow card) 29'; Édgar (yellow card) 56'; Lombán (yellow card) 57'; Dória (yellow card) 60'	Stadium: Camp Nou; Attendance: 70,720; Referee: Carlos Velasco Carballo (Community of Madrid)

17 January 2016 20	Barcelona	6–0	Athletic Bilbao	Barcelona
20:30 CET (UTC+01:00)	Messi 7' (pen.); Neymar 31'; Suárez 47', 68', 82'; Mascherano (yellow card) 51'; Rakitić 62'; Piqué (yellow card) 87'	Report	Iraizoz (red card) 4'; De Marcos (yellow card) 69'; Eraso (yellow card) 85'	Stadium: Camp Nou; Attendance: 68,019; Referee: Antonio Mateu Lahoz (Valencian Community)

23 January 2016 21	Málaga	1–2	Barcelona	Málaga
16:00 CET (UTC+01:00)	Charles (yellow card) 25'; Juanpi 32'; Fornals (yellow card) 86'; Duda (yellow card) 90+4'	Report	Munir 2'; Vermaelen (yellow card) 44'; Messi 51', (yellow card) 65'; Turan (yellow card) 71'	Stadium: La Rosaleda; Attendance: 27,559; Referee: Carlos Clos Gómez (Aragon)

30 January 2016 22	Barcelona	2–1	Atlético Madrid	Barcelona
16:00 CET (UTC+01:00)	Messi 30'; Suárez 38'	Report	Koke 10'; Godín (yellow card) 24' (yellow-red card) 67'; Gabi (yellow card) 25'; Juanfran (yellow card) 41'; Filipe Luís (red card) 44'; Thomas (yellow card) 90+2'	Stadium: Camp Nou; Attendance: 94,990; Referee: Alberto Undiano Mallenco (Navarre)

7 February 2016 23	Levante	0–2	Barcelona	Valencia
12:00 CET (UTC+01:00)	Feddal (yellow card) 23'; Navarro (yellow card) 57'; Lerma (yellow card) 66'; López (yellow card) 83'	Report	Navarro 21' (o.g.); Piqué (yellow card) 28'; Dani Alves (yellow card) 63'; Busquets (yellow card) 89'; Suárez 90+2'	Stadium: Ciutat de València; Attendance: 22,638; Referee: Pedro Jesús Pérez Montero (Andalusia)

14 February 2016 24	Barcelona	6–1	Celta Vigo	Barcelona
20:30 CET (UTC+01:00)	Messi 28'; Suárez 59', 75', 81'; Rakitić 84'; Neymar 90+1'	Report	Cabral (yellow card) 11'; Planas (yellow card) 26'; Guidetti 39' (pen.); Mallo (yellow card) 42'; Señé (yellow card) 74'	Stadium: Camp Nou; Attendance: 72,850; Referee: Alejandro José Hernández Hernández (Las Palmas)

17 February 2016 16	Sporting Gijón	1–3	Barcelona	Gijón
18:30 CET (UTC+01:00)	Castro 26'; Meré (yellow card) 61'; Canella (yellow card) 90+1'	Report	Messi 24', 30'; Suárez 67'; Busquets (yellow card) 78'	Stadium: El Molinón; Attendance: 28,140; Referee: Ricardo de Burgos Bengoetxea (Basque Country)

20 February 2016 25	Las Palmas	1–2	Barcelona	Las Palmas
16:00 CET (UTC+01:00)	Willian José 10'; Mesa (yellow card) 84'	Report	Suárez 6'; Turan (yellow card) 33'; Neymar 39'; Dani Alves (yellow card) 86'	Stadium: Estadio Gran Canaria; Attendance: 26,951; Referee: Carlos del Cerro Grande (Community of Madrid)

28 February 2016 26	Barcelona	2–1	Sevilla	Barcelona
20:30 CET (UTC+01:00)	Messi 31'; Piqué 48', (yellow card) 90'; Dani Alves (yellow card) 71'; Roberto (yellow card) 74'	Report	Vitolo 20'; Rami (yellow card) 30'; Kolodziejczak (yellow card) 77'	Stadium: Camp Nou; Attendance: 79,684; Referee: Santiago Jaime Latre (Aragon)

3 March 2016 27	Rayo Vallecano	1–5	Barcelona	Madrid
21:00 CET (UTC+01:00)	Llorente (red card) 42'; Manucho 57'; Iturra (red card) 67'	Report	Rakitić 22'; Messi 23', 53', 72'; Turan (yellow card) 78', (goal) 86'; Neymar (yellow card) 87'	Stadium: Campo de Vallecas; Attendance: 14,430; Referee: Iñaki Vicandi Garrido (Basque Country)

6 March 2016 28	Eibar	0–4	Barcelona	Eibar
16:00 CET (UTC+01:00)	Radošević (yellow card) 5'; Ramis (yellow card) 70'; García (yellow card) 82'	Report	Munir 8'; Messi 41', 76' (pen.); Suárez (yellow card) 48', (goal) 84'; Mascherano (yellow card) 83'	Stadium: Ipurua; Attendance: 6,100; Referee: Alberto Undiano Mallenco (Navarre)

12 March 2016 29	Barcelona	6–0	Getafe	Barcelona
16:00 CET (UTC+01:00)	J. Rodríguez 8' (o.g.); Munir 19'; Neymar 32', 51'; Messi 40'; Turan 57'	Report	Velázquez (yellow card) 10'; Medrán (yellow card) 42'; Pedro León (yellow card) 50'	Stadium: Camp Nou; Attendance: 87,533; Referee: Pedro Jesús Pérez Montero (Andalusia)

20 March 2016 30	Villarreal	2–2	Barcelona	Villarreal
16:00 CET (UTC+01:00)	Soldado (yellow card) 20'; Bruno (yellow card) 24'; Asenjo (yellow card) 40'; Ruiz (yellow card) 41'; Rukavina (yellow card) 43'; Bakambu 57'; Mathieu 63' (o.g.); Pina (yellow card) 78'; Mario (yellow card) 84'; Trigueros (yellow card) 85'	Report	Turan (yellow card) 13'; Piqué (yellow card) 16'; Rakitić 20'; Neymar 41' (pen.); Alba (yellow card) 53'; Mascherano (yellow card) 90+4'	Stadium: El Madrigal; Attendance: 24,398; Referee: José María Sánchez Martínez (Murcia)

2 April 2016 31	Barcelona	1–2	Real Madrid	Barcelona
20:30 CEST (UTC+02:00)	Suárez (yellow card) 27'; Mascherano (yellow card) 29'; Piqué 56'; Rakitić (yellow card) 58'	Report	Ramos (yellow card) 10' (yellow-red card) 83'; Carvajal (yellow card) 18'; Benzema 63'; Ronaldo (yellow card) 81', (goal) 85'	Stadium: Camp Nou; Attendance: 98,902; Referee: Alejandro José Hernández Hernández (Las Palmas)

9 April 2016 32	Real Sociedad	1–0	Barcelona	San Sebastián
20:30 CEST (UTC+02:00)	Oyarzabal 5'; Illarramendi (yellow card) 25'	Report	Turan (yellow card) 43'; Mascherano (yellow card) 68'; Piqué (yellow card) 90+2'	Stadium: Anoeta; Attendance: 27,895; Referee: Ignacio Iglesias Villanueva (Galicia)

17 April 2016 33	Barcelona	1–2	Valencia	Barcelona
20:30 CEST (UTC+02:00)	Piqué (yellow card) 35'; Suárez (yellow card) 40'; Messi 63'; Neymar (yellow card) 86'	Report	Barragán (yellow card) 15'; Rakitić 26' (o.g.); Mina 45+1'; Parejo (yellow card) 51'; Gomes (yellow card) 68'	Stadium: Camp Nou; Attendance: 86,903; Referee: David Fernández Borbalán (Andalusia)

20 April 2016 34	Deportivo La Coruña	0–8	Barcelona	A Coruña
20:00 CEST (UTC+02:00)	Cani (yellow card) 30'	Report	Suárez 11', 24', 53', 64'; Rakitić 47'; Messi 73'; Bartra 79'; Neymar 81'	Stadium: Riazor; Attendance: 28,956; Referee: Ricardo de Burgos Bengoetxea (Basque Country)

23 April 2016 35	Barcelona	6–0	Sporting Gijón	Barcelona
20:30 CEST (UTC+02:00)	Messi 12'; Suárez 63', 74' (pen.), 77' (pen.), 88'; Neymar 85' (pen.)	Report	Vranješ (yellow card) 26' (yellow-red card) 84'; Hernández (yellow card) 71'; Halilović (yellow card) 84'	Stadium: Camp Nou; Attendance: 77,299; Referee: Carlos Clos Gómez (Aragon)

30 April 2016 36	Real Betis	0–2	Barcelona	Seville
20:30 CEST (UTC+02:00)	Bruno (yellow card) 21'; Westermann (yellow card) 28' (yellow-red card) 35'; Petros (yellow card) 34'; Ceballos (yellow card) 66'	Report	Piqué (yellow card) 23'; Messi (yellow card) 23'; Dani Alves (yellow card) 45+1'; Rakitić 50'; Suárez 81'	Stadium: Benito Villamarín; Attendance: 44,015; Referee: Antonio Mateu Lahoz (Valencian Community)

8 May 2016 37	Barcelona	5–0	Espanyol	Barcelona
17:00 CEST (UTC+02:00)	Messi 8', (yellow card) 12'; Suárez 52', 61'; Rafinha 74'; Neymar 83'; Mascherano (yellow card) 90'	Report	Diop (yellow card) 18'; Pérez (yellow card) 27'; Álvarez (yellow card) 36'; Cañas (yellow card) 39'; López (yellow card) 63'; Pau (yellow card) 69'; Rober (yellow card) 69'	Stadium: Camp Nou; Attendance: 91,610; Referee: Jesús Gil Manzano (Extremadura)

14 May 2016 38	Granada	0–3	Barcelona	Granada
17:00 CEST (UTC+02:00)	Doucouré (yellow card) 54'; Pérez (yellow card) 62'; Rico (yellow card) 65'; Fernández (yellow card) 74'	Report	Busquets (yellow card) 19'; Suárez 22', 38', 86'; Piqué (yellow card) 74'	Stadium: Nuevo Los Cármenes; Attendance: 21,692; Referee: Alejandro José Hernández Hernández (Las Palmas)

=== Copa del Rey ===
==== Round of 32 ====
28 October 2015 First leg	Villanovense	0–0	Barcelona	Villanueva de la Serena
20:30 CET (UTC+01:00)	Pajuelo (yellow card) 53'; Trinidad (yellow card) 82'	Report	Gumbau (yellow card) 59'	Stadium: Romero Cuerda; Attendance: 10,500; Referee: Eduardo Prieto Iglesias (Navarre)

2 December 2015 Second leg	Barcelona	6–1 (6–1 agg.)	Villanovense	Barcelona
20:00 CET (UTC+01:00)	Dani Alves 4'; Sandro 21', 31', 69'; Mascherano (yellow card) 44'; Munir 51', 76'	Report	Juanfran 29'; Trinidad (yellow card) 33'; Elías (yellow card) 41'	Stadium: Camp Nou; Attendance: 67,703; Referee: Pedro Jesús Pérez Montero (Andalusia)

==== Round of 16 ====
6 January 2016 First leg	Barcelona	4–1	Espanyol	Barcelona
20:30 CET (UTC+01:00)	Messi 13', 44', (yellow card) 78'; Neymar (yellow card) 34', (goal) 88'; Suárez (yellow card) 45+2'; Piqué 49'	Report	Caicedo 9'; Abraham (yellow card) 11'; Gerard (yellow card) 20'; Pau (yellow card) 45+2'; Diop (yellow card) 52' (red card) 75'; Pérez (yellow card) 59' (yellow-red card) 72'; Burgui (yellow card) 74'; Roco (yellow card) 78'	Stadium: Camp Nou; Attendance: 76,667; Referee: Juan Martínez Munuera (Valencian Community)

13 January 2016 Second leg	Espanyol	0–2 (1–6 agg.)	Barcelona	Cornellà de Llobregat
21:00 CET (UTC+01:00)	Burgui (yellow card) 32'; Álvaro (yellow card) 39'; Caicedo (yellow card) 42'; Sevilla (yellow card) 62'	Report	Munir 32', 87'; Vidal (yellow card) 72'; Rakitić (yellow card) 81'; Adriano (yellow card) 84'	Stadium: Cornellà-El Prat; Attendance: 20,843; Referee: David Fernández Borbalán (Andalusia)

==== Quarter-finals ====
20 January 2016 First leg	Athletic Bilbao	1–2	Barcelona	Bilbao
21:00 CET (UTC+01:00)	Laporte (yellow card) 54'; De Marcos (yellow card) 65'; Etxeita (yellow card) 67'; Sabin (yellow card) 76'; Iturraspe (yellow card) 77'; Aduriz 89'; San José (yellow card) 90+3'	Report	Munir 18'; Neymar 24'; Iniesta (yellow card) 39'; Mascherano (yellow card) 78'; Dani Alves (yellow card) 90'	Stadium: San Mamés; Attendance: 53,000; Referee: José Luis González González (Castile and León)

27 January 2016 Second leg	Barcelona	3–1 (5–2 agg.)	Athletic Bilbao	Barcelona
21:30 CET (UTC+01:00)	Suárez 53', (yellow card) 70'; Piqué 81'; Neymar 90+1'	Report	Williams 12'; Rico (yellow card) 19'; Balenziaga (yellow card) 39'; Lekue (yellow card) 52'	Stadium: Camp Nou; Attendance: 63,405; Referee: Alejandro José Hernández Hernández (Las Palmas)

==== Semi-finals ====
3 February 2016 First leg	Barcelona	7–0	Valencia	Barcelona
21:00 CET (UTC+01:00)	Suárez 7', 12', 83', 88'; Iniesta (yellow card) 14'; Piqué (yellow card) 24'; Messi 29', 58', 74'; Neymar (penalty missed) 45+2'; Turan (yellow card) 84'	Report	Mustafi (red card) 45+2'; Feghouli (yellow card) 65'; Cheryshev (yellow card) 79'	Stadium: Camp Nou; Attendance: 60,635; Referee: Ignacio Iglesias Villanueva (Galicia)

10 February 2016 Second leg	Valencia	1–1 (1–8 agg.)	Barcelona	Valencia
21:00 CET (UTC+01:00)	Diallo (yellow card) 35'; Negredo 39'; Santos (yellow card) 41'; Gayà (yellow card) 63'; Salvador (yellow card) 88'	Report	Munir (yellow card) 24'; Samper (yellow card) 73'; Kaptoum 84'	Stadium: Mestalla; Attendance: 16,296; Referee: Carlos Velasco Carballo (Community of Madrid)

==== Final ====
22 May 2016 Final	Barcelona	2–0 (a.e.t.)	Sevilla	Madrid
21:30 CEST (UTC+02:00)	Mascherano (red card) 36'; Alba (yellow card) 87', (goal) 97'; Neymar (yellow card) 89', (goal) 120+2'; Dani Alves (yellow card) 90'; Iniesta (yellow card) 90'	Report	Rami (yellow card) 73'; Vitolo (yellow card) 75'; Banega (red card) 90+2'; Iborra (yellow card) 90+5'; Krychowiak (yellow card) 92'; Konoplyanka (yellow card) 102'; Escudero (yellow card) 104'; Gameiro (yellow card) 114'; Carriço (yellow card) 120+1' (yellow-red card) 120+1'	Stadium: Vicente Calderón; Attendance: 54,907; Referee: Carlos del Cerro Grande (Community of Madrid)

=== Supercopa de España ===
14 August 2015 First leg	Athletic Bilbao	4–0	Barcelona	Bilbao
22:00 CEST	San José 13', (yellow card) 90+3'; Eraso (yellow card) 44'; Beñat (yellow card) 45'; Aduriz 53', 60', 67' (pen.); Etxeita (yellow card) 70'; Susaeta (yellow card) 74'; Gurpegui (yellow card) 88'	Report	Pedro (yellow card) 41'; Dani Alves (yellow card) 67'; Mascherano (yellow card) 80'; Iniesta (yellow card) 90+1'	Stadium: San Mamés; Attendance: 40,000; Referee: González González (Castile and León)

17 August 2015 Second leg	Barcelona	1–1 (1–5 agg.)	Athletic Bilbao	Barcelona
22:00 CEST	Messi 43'; Pedro (yellow card) 45'; Piqué (red card) 56'	Report	Bóveda (yellow card) 30'; Eraso (yellow card) 41'; Aduriz (yellow card) 59', (goal) 74'; Beñat (yellow card) 60'; Sola (red card) 86'	Stadium: Camp Nou; Attendance: 88,834; Referee: Velasco Carballo (Community of Madrid)

=== UEFA Champions League ===
==== Group stage ====
Pos	Team	Pld	W	D	L	GF	GA	GD	Pts	Qualification	BAR	ROM	LEV	BATE
1	(Spain) Barcelona	6	4	2	0	15	4	+11	14	Advance to knockout phase	—	6–1	2–1	3–0
2	(Italy) Roma	6	1	3	2	11	16	−5	6	Advance to knockout phase	1–1	—	3–2	0–0
3	(Germany) Bayer Leverkusen	6	1	3	2	13	12	+1	6	Transfer to Europa League	1–1	4–4	—	4–1
4	(Belarus) BATE Borisov	6	1	2	3	5	12	−7	5		0–2	3–2	1–1	—

Source: UEFA
Rules for classification: Group stage tiebreakers

16 September 2015 1	Roma (Italy)	1–1	(Spain) Barcelona	Rome, Italy
20:45 CEST (UTC+02:00)	Florenzi 31'; Nainggolan (yellow card) 63'	UEFA Report; Club Report	Suárez 21'; Piqué (yellow card) 75'	Stadium: Stadio Olimpico; Attendance: 57,836; Referee: Björn Kuipers (Netherlands)

29 September 2015 2	Barcelona (Spain)	2–1	(Germany) Bayer Leverkusen	Barcelona, Spain
20:45 CEST (UTC+02:00)	Mascherano (yellow card) 31'; Neymar (yellow card) 37'; Alba (yellow card) 75'; Roberto 80'; Suárez 82'	UEFA Report; Club Report	Papadopoulos 22', (yellow card) 68'; Bender (yellow card) 40'; Çalhanoğlu (yellow card) 63'; Kampl (yellow card) 89'	Stadium: Camp Nou; Attendance: 68,694; Referee: Martin Atkinson (England)

20 October 2015 3	BATE Borisov (Belarus)	0–2	(Spain) Barcelona	Barysaw, Belarus
20:45 CEST (UTC+02:00)	Palyakow (yellow card) 29'; M. Valadzko (yellow card) 43'; Hayduchyk (yellow card) 61'; Karnitsky (yellow card) 82'; Milunović (yellow card) 83'; A. Valadzko (yellow card) 88'	UEFA Report; Club Report	Busquets (yellow card) 23'; Dani Alves (yellow card) 41'; Rakitić 48', 65'; Gumbau (yellow card) 74'	Stadium: Borisov Arena; Attendance: 13,073; Referee: Manuel De Sousa (Portugal)

4 November 2015 4	Barcelona (Spain)	3–0	(Belarus) BATE Borisov	Barcelona, Spain
20:45 CET (UTC+01:00)	Neymar 30' (pen.), 83'; Dani Alves (yellow card) 51'; Suárez 60'	UEFA Report; Club Report	Mladenović (yellow card) 30'; Mazalewski (yellow card) 44'; Nikolić (yellow card) 80'	Stadium: Camp Nou; Attendance: 68,502; Referee: István Vad (Hungary)

24 November 2015 5	Barcelona (Spain)	6–1	(Italy) Roma	Barcelona, Spain
20:45 CET (UTC+01:00)	Suárez 15', 44'; Messi 18', 59', (yellow card) 63'; Piqué (yellow card) 41', (goal) 56'; Dani Alves (yellow card) 57'; Neymar (penalty missed) 77'; Adriano 77'	UEFA Report; Club Report	Vainqueur (yellow card) 62'; Džeko (penalty missed) 82', 90+1'	Stadium: Camp Nou; Attendance: 71,433; Referee: Cüneyt Çakır (Turkey)

9 December 2015 6	Bayer Leverkusen (Germany)	1–1	(Spain) Barcelona	Leverkusen, Germany
20:45 CET (UTC+01:00)	Hernández 23'; Kampl (yellow card) 29'	UEFA Report; Club Report	Messi 20'; Bartra (yellow card) 52'; Gumbau (yellow card) 85'; Rakitić (yellow card) 86'	Stadium: BayArena; Attendance: 29,412; Referee: Mark Clattenburg (England)

==== Knockout phase ====
===== Round of 16 =====
23 February 2016 First leg	Arsenal (England)	0–2	(Spain) Barcelona	London, England
20:45 CET (UTC+01:00)	Monreal (yellow card) 6'	UEFA Report; Club Report	Messi 71', 83' (pen.); Piqué (yellow card) 85'	Stadium: Emirates Stadium; Attendance: 59,889; Referee: Cüneyt Çakır (Turkey)

16 March 2016 Second leg	Barcelona (Spain)	3–1 (5–1 agg.)	(England) Arsenal	Barcelona, Spain
20:45 CET (UTC+01:00)	Neymar 18'; Suárez 65'; Turan (yellow card) 79'; Messi 88'	UEFA Report; Club Report	Flamini (yellow card) 32'; Gabriel (yellow card) 35'; Sánchez (yellow card) 50'; Elneny 51'; Giroud (yellow card) 85'	Stadium: Camp Nou; Attendance: 76,092; Referee: Sergei Karasev (Russia)

===== Quarter-finals =====
5 April 2016 First leg	Barcelona (Spain)	2–1	(Spain) Atlético Madrid	Barcelona, Spain
20:45 CEST (UTC+02:00)	Busquets (yellow card) 48'; Suárez 63', 74', (yellow card) 70'; Mascherano (yellow card) 82'	UEFA Report; Club Report	F. Torres 25', (yellow card) 29' (yellow-red card) 35'; Koke (yellow card) 33'; Filipe Luís (yellow card) 61'; Griezmann (yellow card) 73'; Hernandez (yellow card) 78'; Oblak (yellow card) 79'; Fernández (yellow card) 86'	Stadium: Camp Nou; Attendance: 88,534; Referee: Felix Brych (Germany)

13 April 2016 Second leg	Atlético Madrid (Spain)	2–0 (3–2 agg.)	(Spain) Barcelona	Madrid, Spain
20:45 CEST (UTC+02:00)	Griezmann 36', 88' (pen.); Gabi (yellow card) 69'; Godín (yellow card) 85'; Correa (yellow card) 90'; Koke (yellow card) 90+5'	UEFA Report; Club Report	Suárez (yellow card) 70'; Neymar (yellow card) 76'; Iniesta (yellow card) 87'; Turan (yellow card) 90+1'	Stadium: Vicente Calderón; Attendance: 52,851; Referee: Nicola Rizzoli (Italy)

=== UEFA Super Cup ===
11 August 2015 Final	Barcelona (Spain)	5–4 (a.e.t.)	(Spain) Sevilla	Tbilisi, Georgia
22:45 GET	Messi 7', 16'; Rafinha 44'; Suárez 52'; Mathieu (yellow card) 71'; Pedro (yellow card) 94', (goal) 115'; Busquets (yellow card) 117'; Dani Alves (yellow card) 120'	Report	Banega 3', (yellow card) 90+2'; Krychowiak (yellow card) 14'; Reyes 57'; Gameiro 72' (pen.); Konoplyanka 81'; Coke (yellow card) 87'; Immobile (yellow card) 92'; Krohn-Dehli (yellow card) 120'	Stadium: Boris Paichadze Dinamo Arena; Attendance: 51,940; Referee: Willie Collum (Scotland)

=== FIFA Club World Cup ===
17 December 2015 Semi-finals	Barcelona (Spain)	3–0	(China) Guangzhou Evergrande	Yokohama, Japan
19:30 JST (UTC+9)	Suárez 39', 50', 67' (pen.)	Report	Feng (yellow card) 16'	Stadium: International Stadium Yokohama; Attendance: 63,870; Referee: Joel Aguilar (El Salvador)

20 December 2015 Final	River Plate (Argentina)	0–3	(Spain) Barcelona	Yokohama, Japan
19:30 JST (UTC+9)	Kranevitter (yellow card) 10'; Ponzio (yellow card) 32'	Report	Alba (yellow card) 16'; Messi 36'; Rakitić (yellow card) 43'; Suárez 49', 68'; Neymar (yellow card) 61'; Roberto (yellow card) 72'	Stadium: International Stadium Yokohama; Attendance: 66,853; Referee: Alireza Faghani (Iran)
