= Sergey Tsinkevich =

Belarusian footballer

Personal information
- Date of birth: 19 September 1976 (age 50)
- Place of birth: Osipovichi, Mogilev Oblast, Belarusian SSR
- Position: Defender

Senior career*
Years	Team	Apps	(Gls)
1994	Dnepr Mogilev	2	(0)
1995	KRZ Osipovichi	14	(0)
1997–1998	Torpedo Zhodino	40	(0)
1998–2000	Svisloch-Krovlya Osipovichi	72	(1)
2003	Osipovichi	19	(1)
- * Club domestic league appearances and goals

Sergey Tsinkevich (Russian: Сергей Цинкевич, Belarusian: Сяргей Цынкевіч; born 19 September 1976) is a Belarusian professional football referee and former player. He has officiated matches of the Belarusian Premier League since 2008.

Tsinkevich became a FIFA referee in 2010.
