= Filip Mladenović =

Serbian footballer

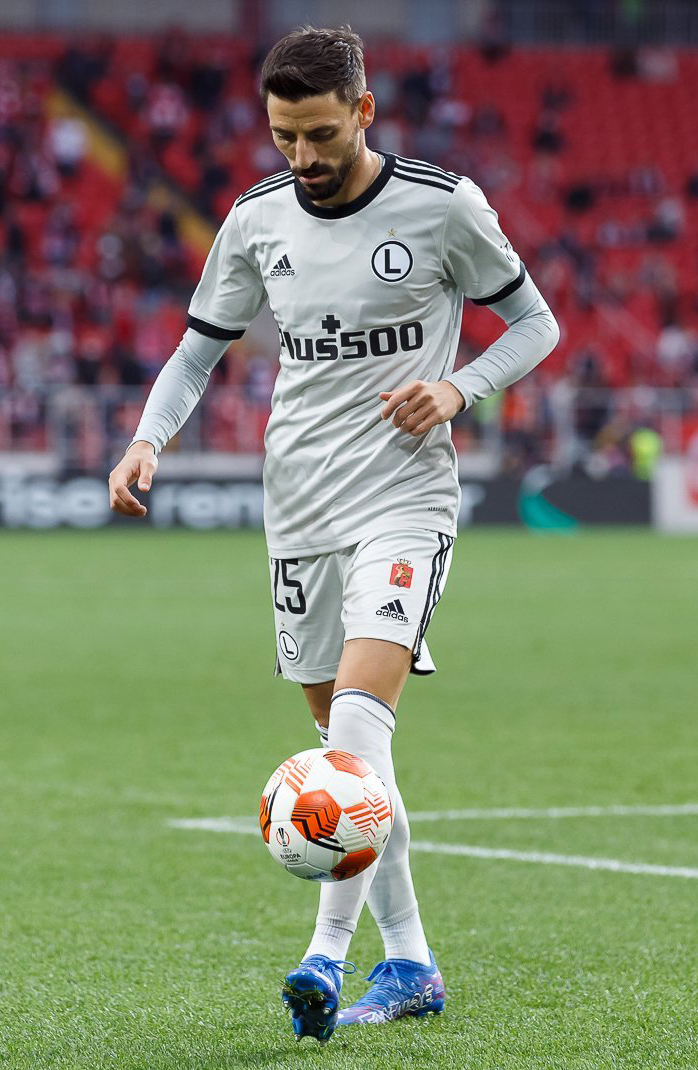
- Mladenović with Legia Warsaw in 2021

Personal information
- Full name: Filip Mladenović
- Date of birth: 15 August 1991 (age 35)
- Place of birth: Čačak, SR Serbia, Yugoslavia
- Height: 1.81 m (5 ft 11 in)
- Position: Left-back

Team information
- Current team: Mladost Lučani

Senior career*
Years	Team	Apps	(Gls)
2010–2011	Borac Čačak	31	(0)
2012–2013	Red Star Belgrade	42	(2)
2014–2015	BATE Borisov	47	(4)
2016	1. FC Köln	16	(0)
2017	Standard Liège	5	(0)
2018–2020	Lechia Gdańsk	74	(3)
2020–2023	Legia Warsaw	74	(13)
2023–2026	Panathinaikos	66	(2)
2026	→ Fatih Karagümrük (loan)	10	(1)
2026–	Mladost Lučani	6	(0)

International career^{‡}
2011–2012	Serbia U21	7	(0)
2012–2024	Serbia	34	(1)
- * Club domestic league appearances and goals as of 21 November 2026 ‡ National team caps and goals as of 25 June 2024

Filip Mladenović (Serbian Cyrillic: Филип Mлaдeнoвић; born 15 August 1991) is a Serbian professional footballer who plays as a left-back for Serbian SuperLiga club Mladost Lučani.

== Club career ==
=== Borac Čačak ===
Mladenović became a member of the Borac senior team in the 2010–11 season, making 18 league appearances that season. He played as left-back.

=== Red Star Belgrade ===
Mladenović signed a four-year contract for Red Star Belgrade on 17 December 2011. During the summer of 2013, Red Star participated in the Uhrencup in Switzerland, where they lost the final against FC Basel with a score of 2–1. Mladenović scored for Red Star and was voted best player of the game, for which he was supposed to get a watch as a prize, but he rejected it out of disappointment with the loss. By the end of 2013, Red Star's financial situation became very unstable as players and staff were not getting paid after several months of waiting. In spite of his frequent scoring and lanky frame, Mladenović was played mostly as a left back under coach Ricardo Sá Pinto, who said that Mladenović's playing style reminded him of Fábio Coentrão. An exodus began when Sá Pinto announced in an emotional press conference when he said that he could no longer work at Red Star due to instabilities in the team's administration. On 5 October 2013, Mladenović filed a request to have his contract terminated with Red Star. The Arbitration Committee in the FSS ruled in Mladenović's favor on 23 November, giving him the status of a free agent. After the ruling on Mladenović and Marko Vešović, coach Slaviša Stojanovič took both players off of the first team, but legally were still members of Red Star until the winter 2013–14 transfer window.

=== BATE Borisov ===
On 23 February 2014, Serbian news portal B92 reported that Mladenović signed for Belarusian team BATE Borisov with a three-year contract. He made his debut for BATE in the 2014 Belarusian Super Cup final against FC Minsk, and went on to score a goal 20 minutes into the game. On 29 September 2015, Mladenović scored two goals for BATE in the 2015–16 UEFA Champions League Group E against Roma. Thanks to his breakthrough game, Mladenović was listed on UEFA.com's Champions League "Team of the Week" on 1 October 2015. Later that month, AC Milan was reported to show interest with their coach Siniša Mihajlović having known Mladenović from coaching the Serbia national team.

=== 1. FC Köln ===
On 5 January 2016, Mladenović signed a three-and-a-half-year contract with 1. FC Köln.

=== Legia Warsaw ===
On 1 July 2020, Mladenović signed a three-year contract with the Poland Ekstraklasa side Legia Warsaw. He scored his maiden for Legia on 14 August 2020 in his debut in a 6–1 Polish Cup match victory against GKS Bełchatów. He scored his first league goal for Legia on 2 November 2020 in a 3–0 win against Warta Poznań. On 2 May 2023, he won the Polish Cup, defeating Raków Częstochowa in the final at the National Stadium, before being sanctioned by the Disciplinary Committee of the Polish Football Association on 5 May 2023 for post-match behavior with a three-month disqualification covering all games (including outside Poland) and a financial penalty of PLN 120,000. His contract expired after the 2022–23 season.

=== Panathinaikos ===
On 12 June 2023, Greek side Panathinaikos announced the signing of Mladenović on a two-year deal.

== International career ==
Mladenović made his debut for the Serbia national football team under coach Siniša Mihajlović on 31 May 2012, in a 2–0 loss against France.

In November 2022, he was selected in Serbia's squad for the 2022 FIFA World Cup in Qatar. He played in a group stage match against Brazil.

Mladenović was part of the Serbia squad for UEFA Euro 2024. In the team's opening match of the tournament against England, he came on as a substitute for the injured Filip Kostić in the 43rd minute of the 1–0 loss. He also played in group stage matches against Slovenia and Denmark. Serbia finished fourth in the group.

== Career statistics ==
=== Club ===
As of match played 17 December 2025

Appearances and goals by club, season and competition
Club	Season	League			National cup (Note: Includes Serbian Cup, Belarusian Cup, Polish Cup, Greek Cup)		Europe		Other		Total	
Club	Season	Division	Apps	Goals	Apps	Goals	Apps	Goals	Apps	Goals	Apps	Goals
Borac Čačak	2010–11	Serbian SuperLiga	18	0	0	0	—		—		18	0
Borac Čačak	2011–12	Serbian SuperLiga	13	0	2	0	—		—		15	0
Borac Čačak	Total		31	0	2	0	—		—		33	0
Red Star Belgrade	2011–12	Serbian SuperLiga	12	2	3	0	—		—		15	2
Red Star Belgrade	2012–13	SuperLiga	26	0	3	0	6 (Note: Appearances in UEFA Europa League)	1	—		35	1
Red Star Belgrade	2013–14	SuperLiga	4	0	2	0	4	0	—		10	0
Red Star Belgrade	Total		42	2	8	0	10	1	—		60	3
BATE	2014	Belarusian Premier League	26	2	7	0	8 (Note: Appearances in UEFA Champions League)	0	1 (Note: Appearance in Belarusian Super Cup)	1	42	3
BATE	2015	Belarusian Premier League	21	2	2	0	12	2	1	0	36	4
BATE	Total		47	4	9	0	20	2	2	1	78	7
1. FC Köln	2015–16	Bundesliga	14	0	0	0	—		—		14	0
1. FC Köln	2016–17	Bundesliga	2	0	0	0	—		—		2	0
1. FC Köln	Total		16	0	0	0	—		—		16	0
Standard Liège	2016–17	Belgian Pro League	5	0	0	0	—		—		5	0
Standard Liège	2017–18	Belgian Pro League	0	0	0	0	—		—		0	0
Standard Liège	Total		5	0	0	0	—		—		5	0
Lechia Gdańsk	2017–18	Ekstraklasa	14	0	—		—		—		14	0
Lechia Gdańsk	2018–19	Ekstraklasa	35	3	6	0	—		—		41	3
Lechia Gdańsk	2019–20	Ekstraklasa	25	0	3	0	2	0	1 (Note: Appearance in Polish Super Cup)	0	31	0
Lechia Gdańsk	Total		74	3	9	0	2	0	1	0	86	3
Legia Warsaw	2020–21	Ekstraklasa	29	7	3	1	4 (Note: Two appearances in UEFA Champions League, two appearances in UEFA Europa League)	0	—		36	8
Legia Warsaw	2021–22	Ekstraklasa	19	0	3	0	13 (Note: Six appearances in UEFA Champions League, seven appearances and one goal in UEFA Europa League)	1	1	0	36	1
Legia Warsaw	2022–23	Ekstraklasa	26	6	4	0	0	0	0	0	30	6
Legia Warsaw	Total		74	13	10	1	17	1	1	0	102	15
Panathinaikos	2023–24	Super League Greece	30	1	6	1	8 (Note: Two appearances in UEFA Champions League, six appearances in UEFA Europa League)	0	—		44	2
Panathinaikos	2024–25	Super League Greece	28	1	4	0	16 (Note: Four appearances in UEFA Europa League, twelve appearances in UEFA Conference League)	1	—		48	2
Panathinaikos	2025–26	Super League Greece	8	0	4	2	4	0	—		16	2
Panathinaikos	Total		66	2	14	3	28	1	0	0	108	6
Career total			355	24	52	4	77	5	4	1	488	34

=== International ===
As of match played 25 June 2024

Appearances and goals by national team and year
National team	Year	Apps	Goals
Serbia	2012	1	0
Serbia	2013	0	0
Serbia	2014	0	0
Serbia	2015	0	0
Serbia	2016	5	0
Serbia	2017	0	0
Serbia	2018	0	0
Serbia	2019	4	0
Serbia	2020	5	1
Serbia	2021	3	0
Serbia	2022	3	0
Serbia	2023	8	0
Serbia	2024	5	0
Total		34	1

Scores and results list Serbia's goal tally first, score column indicates score after each Mladenović goal.

List of international goals scored by Filip Mladenović
No.	Date	Venue	Opponent	Score	Result	Competition
1	18 November 2020	Rajko Mitić Stadium, Belgrade, Serbia	Russia	5–0	5–0	2020–21 UEFA Nations League B

== Honours ==
Red Star

- Serbian Cup: 2011–12

BATE Borisov

- Belarusian Premier League: 2014, 2015
- Belarusian Cup: 2014–15
- Belarusian Super Cup: 2014, 2015

Lechia Gdańsk

- Polish Cup: 2018–19
- Polish Super Cup: 2019

Legia Warsaw

- Ekstraklasa: 2020–21
- Polish Cup: 2022–23

Panathinaikos

- Greek Cup: 2023–24

Individual

- Serbian SuperLiga Team of the Season: 2011–12
- Ekstraklasa Player of the Season: 2020–21
- Ekstraklasa Defender of the Season: 2020–21
- Ekstraklasa Player of the Month: February 2019
