= Mikhail Gordeychuk =

Kazakhstani-born Belarusian footballer

Personal information
- Full name: Mikhail Nikolayevich Gordeychuk
- Date of birth: 23 October 1989 (age 37)
- Place of birth: Saran, Kazakh SSR, Soviet Union
- Height: 1.76 m (5 ft 9 1/2 in)
- Position: Attacking midfielder

Team information
- Current team: Niva Dolbizno
- Number: 62

Youth career
- 2007: Shakhter Karagandy

Senior career*
Years	Team	Apps	(Gls)
2007	Shakhter-Yunost Karagandy	19	(3)
2008–2009	Volna Pinsk	45	(10)
2010	Naftan Novopolotsk	32	(3)
2011–2012	BATE Borisov	20	(1)
2012	→ Belshina Bobruisk (loan)	22	(3)
2013	Belshina Bobruisk	31	(9)
2014–2018	BATE Borisov	116	(51)
2019	Tobol	14	(2)
2019–2020	Dinamo Brest	40	(14)
2021–2022	Liepāja	35	(7)
2022–2025	Dinamo Brest	99	(39)
2026	Neman Grodno	13	(1)
2026–	Niva Dolbizno	6	(4)

International career^{‡}
2009–2011	Belarus U21	14	(0)
2011–2012	Belarus Olympic	10	(0)
2013–2019	Belarus	26	(4)
- * Club domestic league appearances and goals as of 30 August 2026 ‡ National team caps and goals as of 11 June 2019

Mikhail Nikolayevich Gordeychuk (Belarusian: Міхаіл Мікалаевіч Гардзяйчук; Russian: Михаил Николаевич Гордейчук; born 23 October 1989) is a Belarusian footballer who plays for Niva Dolbizno.

== Career ==
=== Club ===
On 27 December 2018, FC Tobol announced the signing of Gordeychuk on a two-year contract from BATE Borisov. On 26 July 2019, Gordeychuk left FC Tobol by mutual consent.

=== International ===
Gordeychuk was a member of the Belarus Olympic team that participated in the 2012 Summer Olympics.

== International goals ==
As of match played 31 May 2016. Belarus score listed first, score column indicates score after each Gordeychuk goal.

International goals by date, venue, cap, opponent, score, result and competition
No.	Date	Venue	Cap	Opponent	Score	Result	Competition
1	21 May 2014	Rheinpark Stadion, Vaduz, Liechtenstein	3	Liechtenstein	1–0	5–1	Friendly
2	8 September 2015	Borisov Arena, Barysaw, Belarus	9	Luxembourg	1–0	2–0	UEFA Euro 2016 qualification
3	8 September 2015	Borisov Arena, Barysaw, Belarus	9	Luxembourg	2–0	2–0	UEFA Euro 2016 qualification
4	31 May 2016	Turners Cross, Cork, Ireland	13	Republic of Ireland	1–0	2–1	Friendly

== Honours ==
BATE Borisov

- Belarusian Premier League champion: 2011, 2014, 2015, 2016, 2017, 2018
- Belarusian Cup winner: 2014–15
- Belarusian Super Cup winner: 2011, 2015, 2017

Dinamo Brest

- Belarusian Premier League champion: 2019, 2020
