= Maksim Valadzko =

Belarusian professional footballer

Maksim Volodko
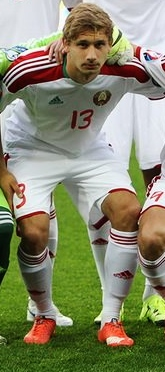

Personal information
- Date of birth: 10 November 1992 (age 34)
- Place of birth: Minsk, Belarus
- Height: 1.80 m (5 ft 11 in)
- Position: Defender

Team information
- Current team: Unixlabs Minsk
- Number: 42

Youth career
- 2009–2011: BATE Borisov

Senior career*
Years	Team	Apps	(Gls)
2009–2018	BATE Borisov	143	(8)
2012	→ SKVICH Minsk (loan)	15	(4)
2019–2020	Arsenal Tula	6	(0)
2020	Tambov	4	(0)
2021–2022	BATE Borisov	20	(1)
2022–2023	FC Santa Coloma	23	(1)
2023–2024	Floriana	24	(1)
2024–2025	Costa D'Amalfi	15	(0)
2026–	Unixlabs Minsk	0	(0)

International career^{‡}
2012–2014	Belarus U21	25	(1)
2014–2021	Belarus	33	(2)
- * Club domestic league appearances and goals as of 8 April 2026 ‡ National team caps and goals as of 2 June 2021

Maksim Valadzko (Belarusian: Максім Валадзько; Russian: Максим Володько; born 10 November 1992) is a Belarusian professional footballer who plays for Unixlabs Minsk.

== Club career ==
On 12 January 2019, he signed with the Russian Premier League club FC Arsenal Tula. He made his debut for Arsenal on 4 May 2019 in a game against FC Lokomotiv Moscow as a 76th-minute substitute for Luka Đorđević. He left Arsenal on 31 July 2020.

On 14 October 2020 he joined FC Tambov.

In August 2024, Maksim Valadzko became a player for the Belarusian media club DMedia. He played 8 matches in the League Cup for them, recording one assist.

On December 10, 2024, Valadzko signed a contract with the Italian club Costa D'Amalfi. His former teammate from FC Santa Coloma became an agent and offered him an option in the Serie D of Italy.

== International ==
Maksim Valadzko made his debut for the senior national side of his country on 18 November 2014, in the 3:2 home win over Mexico in a friendly match, playing 76 minutes.

== Honours ==
BATE Borisov

- Belarusian Premier League champion: 2009, 2011, 2013, 2014, 2015, 2016, 2017, 2018
- Belarusian Cup winner: 2014–15, 2020–21
- Belarusian Super Cup winner: 2013, 2014, 2015, 2016, 2017, 2022

== International goals ==
Scores and results list Belarus' goal tally first.

International goals by date, venue, cap, opponent, score, result and competition
No.	Date	Venue	Cap	Opponent	Score	Result	Competition
1	31 May 2016	Turners Cross, Cork, Ireland	11	Republic of Ireland	2–0	2–1	Friendly
2	7 October 2017	Borisov Arena, Barysaw, Belarus	19	Netherlands	1–1	1–3	2018 FIFA World Cup qualification
