= Artyom Soroko =

Belarusian footballer

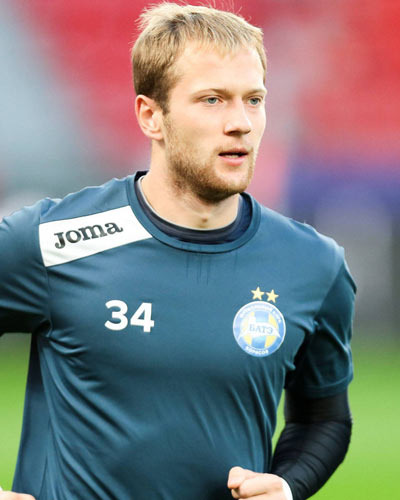

Personal information
- Full name: Artyom Borisovich Soroko
- Date of birth: 1 April 1992 (age 34)
- Place of birth: Minsk, Belarus
- Height: 1.84 m (6 ft 1/2 in)
- Position: Goalkeeper

Team information
- Current team: Arsenal Dzerzhinsk
- Number: 30

Youth career
- 2010–2014: BATE Borisov

Senior career*
Years	Team	Apps	(Gls)
2011–2017	BATE Borisov	11	(0)
2017	→ Isloch Minsk Raion (loan)	9	(0)
2017	→ Torpedo-BelAZ Zhodino (loan)	6	(0)
2018	Slutsk	2	(0)
2018	Luch Minsk	7	(0)
2019	Dnyapro Mogilev	20	(0)
2020–2022	Vitebsk	26	(0)
2022–2023	Arsenal Dzerzhinsk	22	(0)
2024	Slavia Mozyr	5	(0)
2024–	Arsenal Dzerzhinsk	43	(0)

International career
2012–2013	Belarus U21	19	(0)
- * Club domestic league appearances and goals as of 3 July 2026

Artyom Borisovich Soroko (Belarusian: Арцём Барысавіч Сарока; Russian: Артём Борисович Сороко; born 1 April 1992) is a Belarusian professional footballer who plays for Arsenal Dzerzhinsk.

== Honours ==
BATE Borisov

- Belarusian Premier League champion: 2014, 2015, 2016
- Belarusian Cup winner: 2014–15
- Belarusian Super Cup winner: 2013, 2014, 2015, 2016
