= Vital Hayduchyk =

Belarusian footballer

Personal information
- Full name: Vital Viktaravich Hayduchyk
- Date of birth: 12 July 1989 (age 37)
- Place of birth: Brest, Byelorussian SSR, Soviet Union (now Belarus)
- Height: 1.82 m (5 ft 11 1/2 in)
- Position: Centre back

Senior career*
Years	Team	Apps	(Gls)
2007–2012	Dinamo Brest	133	(0)
2013–2017	BATE Borisov	57	(1)
2017	→ Asteras Tripolis (loan)	6	(0)
2018	Sūduva Marijampolė	22	(0)
2019	Torpedo-BelAZ Zhodino	16	(1)
2020	Rukh Brest	21	(0)
2021	Dinamo Brest	14	(0)

International career
2008–2011	Belarus U21	5	(0)
2011–2012	Belarus Olympic	4	(0)
- * Club domestic league appearances and goals as of 31 December 2021

Vital Viktaravich Hayduchyk (Belarusian: Віталь Віктаравіч Гайдучык; Russian: Виталий Викторович Гайдучик, romanized: Vitaly Viktorovich Gayduchik; born 12 July 1989) is a Belarusian former professional footballer.

== Career ==
In the first half of 2017, he was loaned out to Greek Super League Greece club Asteras Tripolis.

Hayduchyk was part of the Belarus U21 team that finished in 3rd place at the 2011 UEFA European Under-21 Football Championship. He made a substitute appearance in the 0:3 group stage loss against Switzerland U21. He was a member of the Belarus Olympic side that participated in the 2012 Toulon Tournament.

== Honours ==
BATE Borisov

- Belarusian Premier League champion: 2013, 2014, 2015, 2016, 2017
- Belarusian Cup winner: 2014–15
- Belarusian Super Cup winner: 2013, 2014, 2016

Sūduva

- A Lyga champion: 2018
