= Borisov Arena =

Football stadium in Barysaw, Belarus

Borisov-Arena
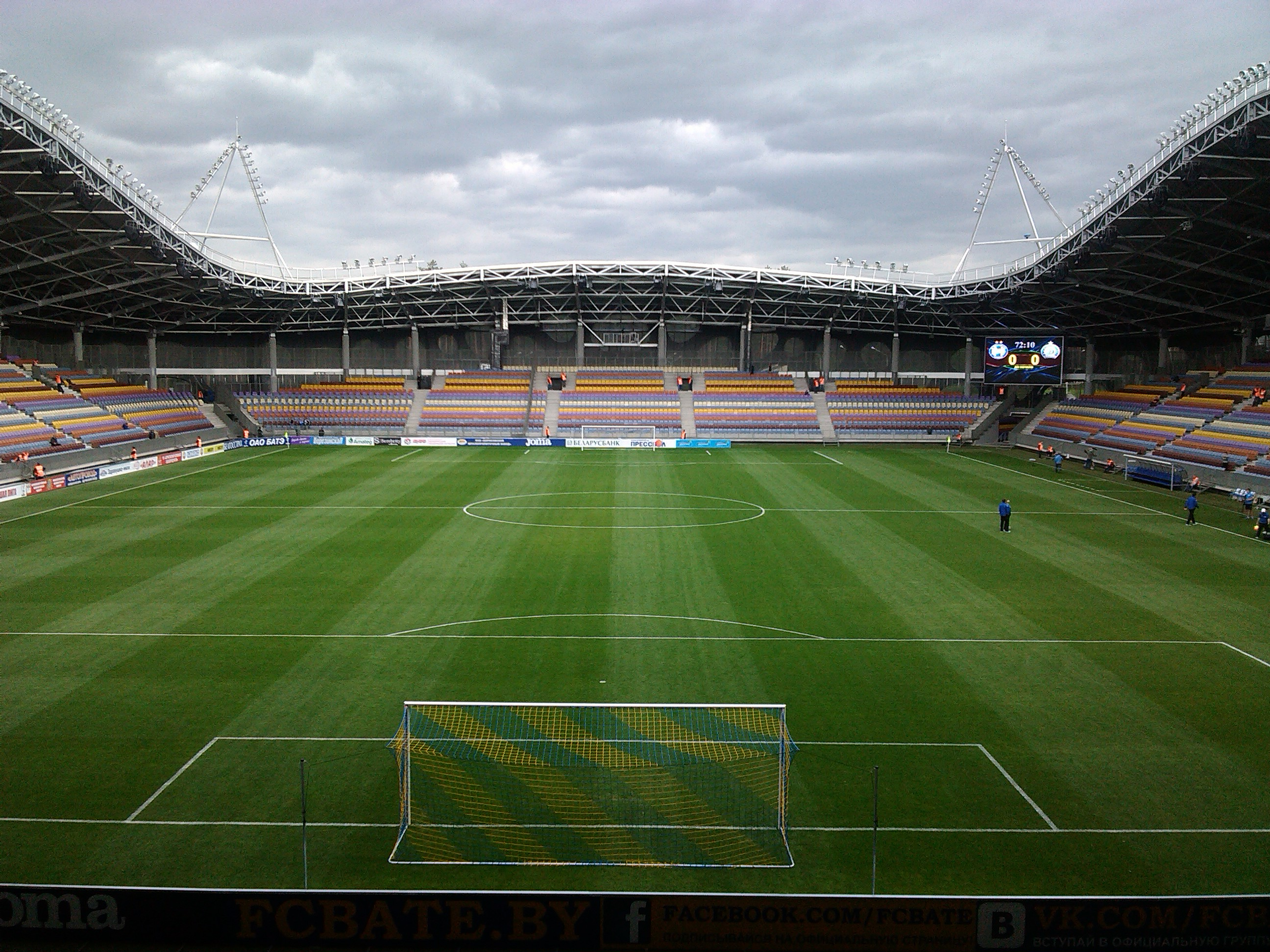
- UEFA Category 4 Stadium
- Interactive map of Borisov-Arena
- Location: Barysaw, Belarus
- Coordinates: 54°11′35″N 28°28′31″E
- Owner: BATE Borisov
- Capacity: 13,126
- Surface: Grass
- Record attendance: 13,121 (Belarus vs Spain, 25 June 2015)
- Field size: 105 m × 68 m (344 ft × 223 ft)

Construction
- Groundbreaking: 2011–2014
- Opened: 3 May 2014; 12 years ago
- Cost: 40,000,000 €
- Architect: OFIS Architects

Tenants
- FC BATE Borisov (2014–); Belarus national football team (2014–2017; 2019)

Borisov Arena (Belarusian: Барысаў-Арэна, Barysaw-Arena; Russian: Борисов-Арена) is a football-specific stadium in Barysaw, Belarus and is the home stadium of FC BATE Borisov and the Belarus national football team. The stadium's official capacity is 13,126.

== History ==
The first official game at the Borisov Arena was the 2013–14 Belarusian Cup Final on 3 May 2014. It was contested between FC Neman Grodno and FC Shakhtyor Soligorsk and won 1-0 by the team from Salihorsk. Ukrainian midfielder Artem Starhorodskyi scored the first ever goal in the stadium in front of an almost full capacity of over 11,000.

== National team matches ==
The Belarus national football team played its first game at the Borisov Arena on 4 September 2014 when they defeated Tajikistan 6–1 in a friendly. The first official national team game was played on 9 October 2014, when Belarus lost 0–2 to Ukraine in a UEFA Euro 2016 qualifier played in front of 10,512 spectators.

=== List of games ===
#	Date	Opponent	Result	Attendance	Competition
1	September 4, 2014	Tajikistan	6–1	2,400	Friendly
2	October 9, 2014	Ukraine	0–2	10,512	UEFA Euro 2016 qualifying
3	October 12, 2014	Slovakia	1–3	3,684	UEFA Euro 2016 qualifying
4	November 18, 2014	Mexico	3–2	6,700	Friendly
5	June 14, 2015	Spain	0–1	13,121	UEFA Euro 2016 qualifying
6	September 08, 2015	Luxembourg	2–0	3,482	UEFA Euro 2016 qualifying
7	October 12, 2015	(North Macedonia) Macedonia	0–0	1,545	UEFA Euro 2016 qualifying
8	September 6, 2016	France	0–0	12,920	2018 FIFA World Cup qualification
9	October 10, 2016	Luxembourg	1–1	9,011	2018 FIFA World Cup qualification
10	June 9, 2017	Bulgaria	2–1	6,150	2018 FIFA World Cup qualification
11	September 3, 2017	Sweden	0–4	6,431	2018 FIFA World Cup qualification
12	October 7, 2017	Netherlands	1–3	6,850	2018 FIFA World Cup qualification
13	June 8, 2019	Germany	0–2	12,510	UEFA Euro 2020 qualifying
14	June 11, 2019	Northern Ireland	0–1	5,250	UEFA Euro 2020 qualifying

== Gallery ==
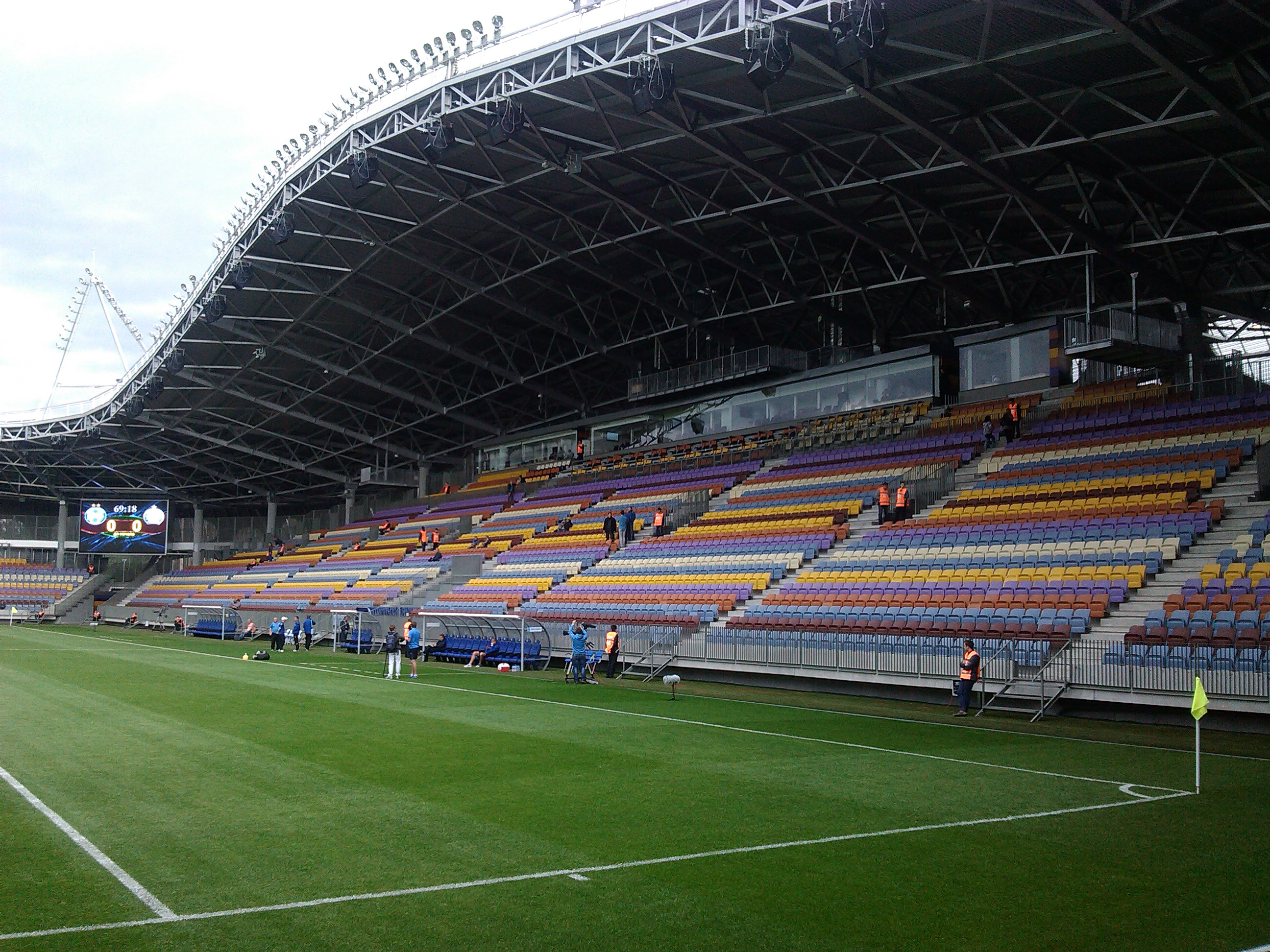
Detail of the stadium's main stand

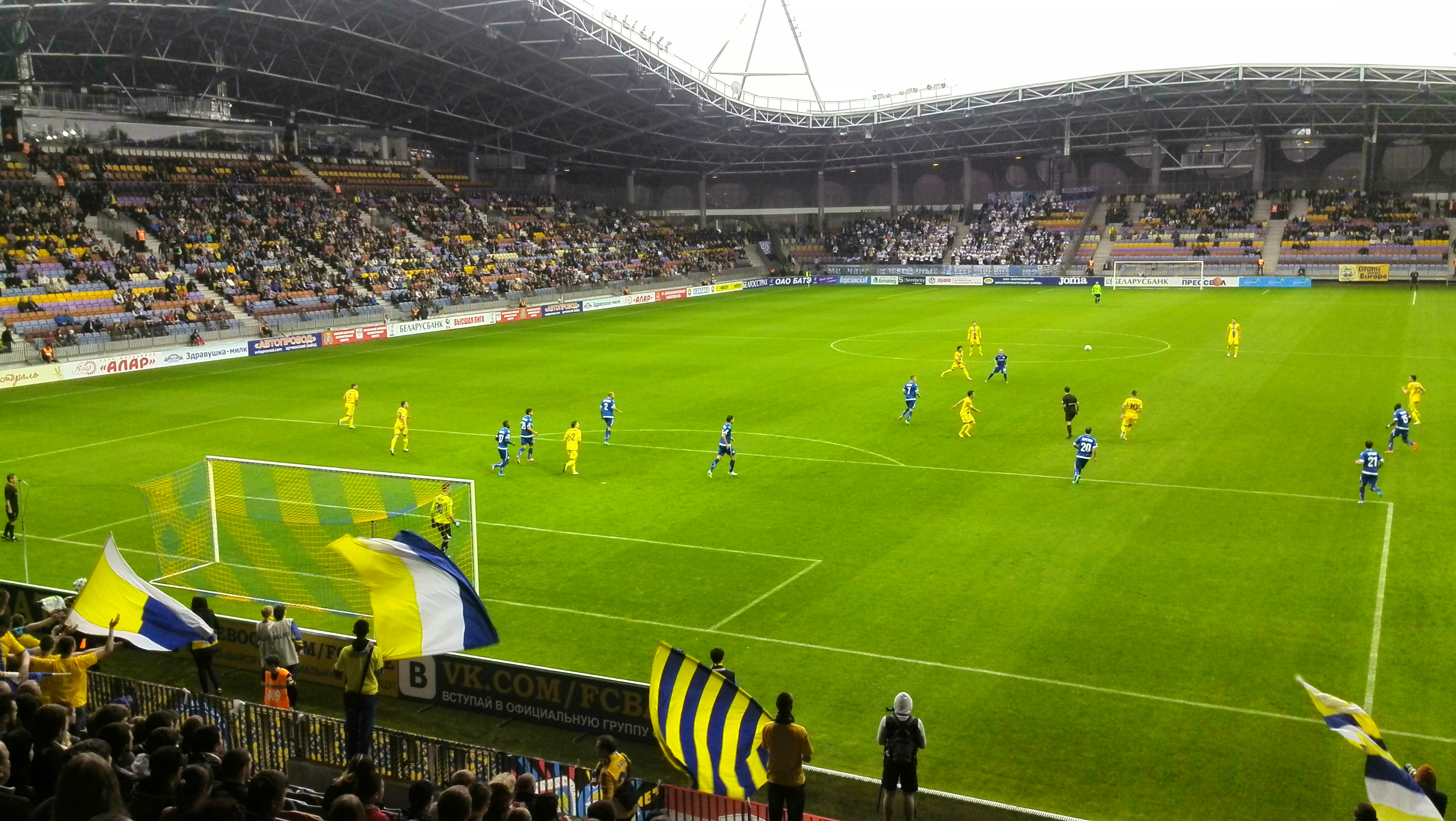
BATE Borisov playing FC Dinamo Minsk on May 5, 2014

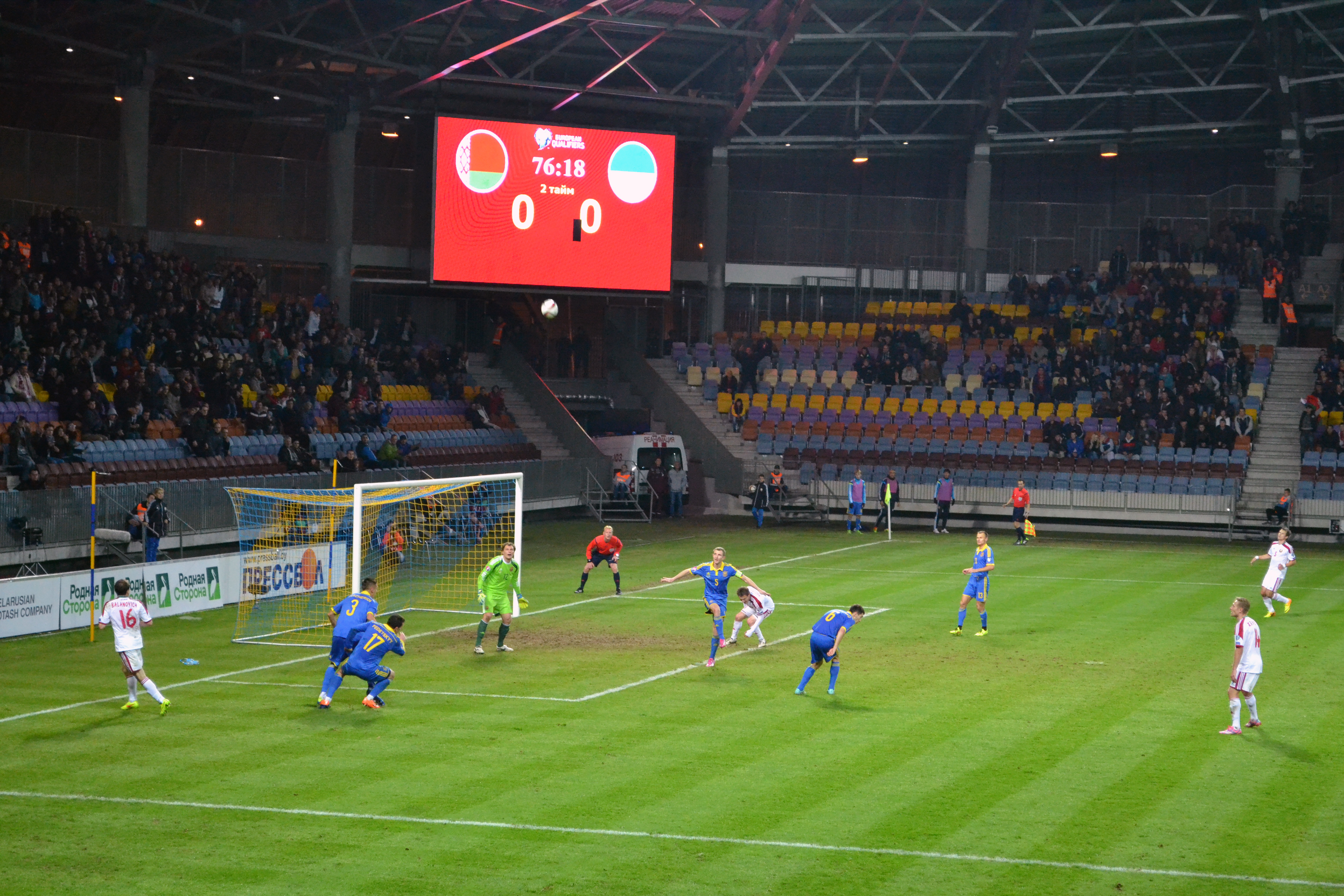
Belarus playing Ukraine at the Borisov Arena on October 9, 2014

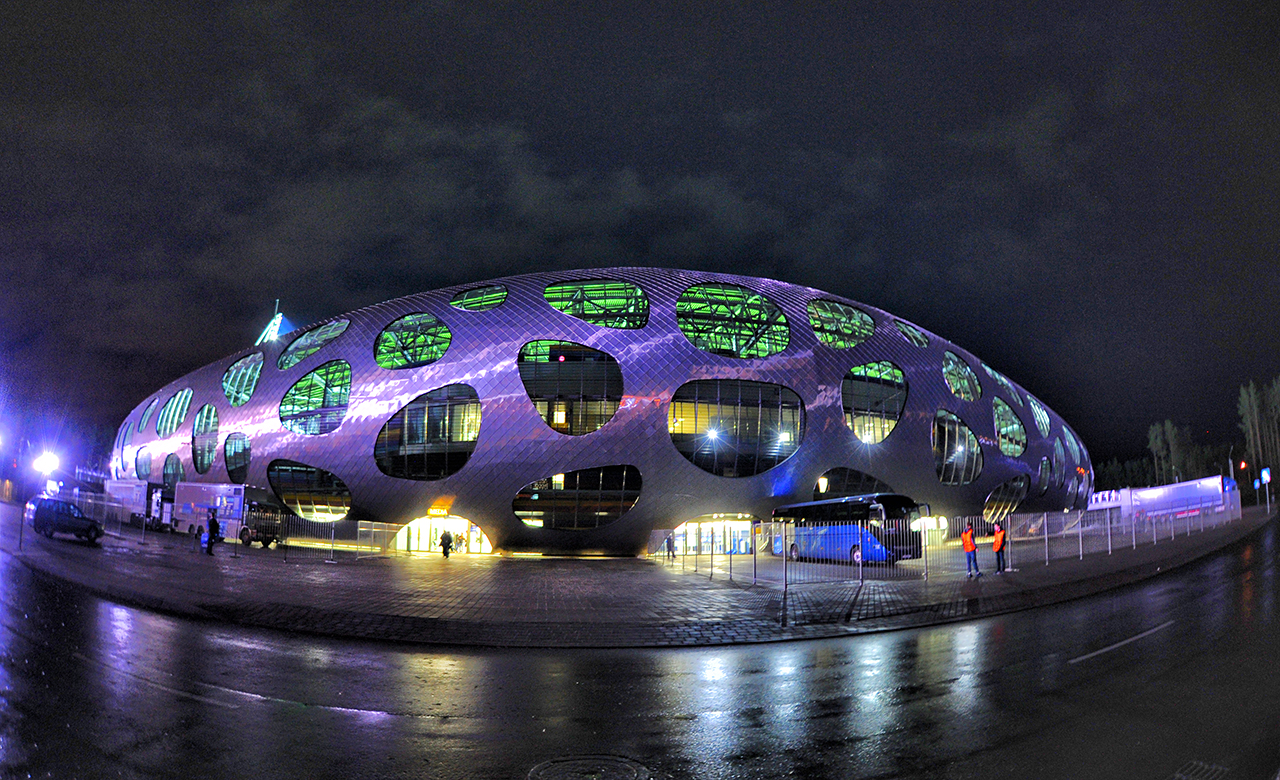
External view of the stadium

== See also ==
- List of football stadiums in Belarus
