= Football at the 2012 Summer Olympics – Men's tournament – Group C =

Group C of the men's football tournament at the 2012 Summer Olympics took place from 26 July to 1 August 2012 in Cardiff's Millennium Stadium, Coventry's City of Coventry Stadium, Glasgow's Hampden Park, Manchester's Old Trafford and Newcastle's St James' Park. The group contained Belarus, Brazil, Egypt and New Zealand.

== Teams ==
Draw position	Team	Pot	Confederation	Method of qualification	Date of qualification	Olympic appearance	Last appearance	Previous best performance
C1	Brazil	2	CONMEBOL	2011 South American U-20 Championship winner	12 February 2011	11th	2008	Silver medal (1984, 1988)
C2	Egypt	4	CAF	2011 CAF U-23 Championship runner-up	10 December 2011	12th	1992	Quarter-finals (1964, 1984)
C3	Belarus	1	UEFA	2011 UEFA European Under-21 Championship play-off winner	25 June 2011	1st	–	–
C4	New Zealand	3	OFC	2012 OFC Men's Olympic Qualifying Tournament winner	25 March 2012	2nd	2008	Group stage (2008)

== Standings ==
Pos	Team	Pld	W	D	L	GF	GA	GD	Pts	Qualification
1	Brazil	3	3	0	0	9	3	+6	9	Advance to knockout stage
2	Egypt	3	1	1	1	6	5	+1	4	Advance to knockout stage
3	Belarus	3	1	0	2	3	6	−3	3	
4	New Zealand	3	0	1	2	1	5	−4	1	

Source: FIFA
Rules for classification: Group stage tiebreakers

In the quarter-finals,

- The winner of Group C, Brazil, advanced to play the runner-up of Group D, Japan.
- The runner-up of Group C, Egypt, advanced to play the winner of Group D, Honduras.

== Matches ==
=== Belarus vs New Zealand ===
26 July 2012
19:45

Belarus	1–0	New Zealand
Baha 45+1'	Report

City of Coventry Stadium, Coventry
Attendance: 14,457
Referee: Bakary Gassama (Gambia)

Belarus	New Zealand

GK	1	Alyaksandr Hutar
DF	3	Ihar Kuzmyanok
DF	4	Syarhey Palitsevich	(yellow card) 51'
DF	12	Alyaksey Kazlow
DF	17	Dzyanis Palyakow
MF	15	Artsyom Salavey		(substituted off) 51'
MF	2	Stanislaw Drahun (c)
MF	5	Dzmitry Baha
MF	10	Renan Bressan		(substituted off) 80'
MF	16	Mikhail Gordeichuk
FW	8	Sergei Kornilenko		(substituted off) 90'
Substitutions:
MF	13	Illya Aleksiyevich		(substituted on) 51'
MF	11	Andrey Varankow		(substituted on) 80'
FW	14	Yahor Zubovich		(substituted on) 90'
Manager:
Georgi Kondratiev

GK	18	Michael O'Keeffe
DF	3	Ian Hogg
DF	5	Tommy Smith	(yellow card) 1'
DF	6	Ryan Nelsen (c)
DF	12	Adam Thomas		(substituted off) 77'
MF	2	Tim Payne
MF	7	Kosta Barbarouses	(yellow card) 60'
MF	8	Michael McGlinchey
FW	9	Shane Smeltz
FW	10	Chris Wood
FW	11	Marco Rojas
Substitutions:
MF	17	Adam McGeorge		(substituted on) 77'
Manager:
(United Kingdom) Neil Emblen

Assistant referees:
Jason Damoo (Seychelles)
Angesom Ogbamariam (Eritrea)
Fourth official:
Yuichi Nishimura (Japan)

=== Brazil vs Egypt ===
26 July 2012
19:45

Brazil	3–2	Egypt
Rafael 16'; Damião 26'; Neymar 30'	Report	Aboutrika 52'; Salah 76'

Millennium Stadium, Cardiff
Attendance: 26,812
Referee: Gianluca Rocchi (Italy)

Brazil	Egypt

GK	18	Neto
DF	2	Rafael
DF	3	Thiago Silva (c)
DF	4	Juan Jesus
DF	6	Marcelo
DF	8	Rômulo
MF	5	Sandro		(substituted off) 78'
MF	10	Oscar
FW	11	Neymar
FW	9	Leandro Damião		(substituted off) 77'
FW	12	Hulk	(yellow card) 60'	(substituted off) 72'
Substitutions:
MF	16	Ganso		(substituted on) 72'
FW	17	Alexandre Pato		(substituted on) 77'
DF	14	Danilo		(substituted on) 78'
Manager:
Mano Menezes

GK	1	Ahmed El Shenawy
DF	2	Mahmoud Alaa	(yellow card) 71'
DF	12	Islam Ramadan	(yellow card) 87'
DF	6	Ahmed Hegazy
DF	7	Ahmed Fathy
MF	13	Saleh Gomaa	(yellow card) 33'	(substituted off) 74'
MF	14	Hossam Hassan
MF	17	Mohamed El-Nenny		(substituted off) 89'
FW	5	Mohamed Aboutrika (c)
FW	9	Marwan Mohsen		(substituted off) 46'
FW	10	Emad Moteab
Substitutions:
FW	11	Mohamed Salah		(substituted on) 46'
MF	8	Shehab Ahmed		(substituted on) 74'
FW	16	Ahmed Magdi		(substituted on) 89'
Manager:
Hany Ramzy

Assistant referees:
Elenito Di Liberatore (Italy)
Gianluca Cariolato (Italy)
Fourth official:
Mark Clattenburg (Great Britain)

=== Egypt vs New Zealand ===
29 July 2012
12:00

Egypt	1–1	New Zealand
Salah 40'	Report	Wood 17'

Old Trafford, Manchester
Attendance: 50,050
Referee: Mark Clattenburg (Great Britain)

Egypt	New Zealand

GK	1	Ahmed El Shenawy
DF	2	Mahmoud Alaa	(yellow card) 60'
DF	6	Ahmed Hegazy
DF	7	Ahmed Fathy
DF	12	Islam Ramadan
MF	13	Saleh Gomaa		(substituted off) 88'
MF	14	Hossam Hassan
MF	17	Mohamed El-Nenny		(substituted off) 68'
FW	5	Mohamed Aboutrika (c)		(substituted off) 88'
FW	10	Emad Moteab
FW	11	Mohamed Salah
Substitutions:
FW	16	Ahmed Magdi		(substituted on) 68'
FW	9	Marwan Mohsen		(substituted on) 88'
MF	8	Shehab Ahmed		(substituted on) 88'
Manager:
Hany Ramzy

GK	18	Michael O'Keeffe
DF	3	Ian Hogg		(substituted off) 63'
DF	5	Tommy Smith
DF	6	Ryan Nelsen (c)
DF	12	Adam Thomas		(substituted off) 89'
MF	2	Tim Payne
MF	7	Kosta Barbarouses
MF	8	Michael McGlinchey
FW	9	Shane Smeltz	(yellow card) 81'
FW	10	Chris Wood
FW	11	Marco Rojas		(substituted off) 84'
Substitutions:
DF	14	James Musa		(substituted on) 63'
MF	15	Cameron Howieson		(substituted on) 84'
MF	13	Alex Feneridis		(substituted on) 89'
Manager:
(United Kingdom) Neil Emblen

Assistant referees:
Stephen Child (Great Britain)
Simon Beck (Great Britain)
Fourth official:
Pavel Královec (Czech Republic)

=== Brazil vs Belarus ===
29 July 2012
15:00

Brazil	3–1	Belarus
Pato 15'; Neymar 65'; Oscar 90+3'	Report	Bressan 8'

Old Trafford, Manchester
Attendance: 66,212
Referee: Yuichi Nishimura (Japan)

Brazil	Belarus

GK	18	Neto
DF	2	Rafael
DF	3	Thiago Silva (c)
DF	4	Juan Jesus
DF	6	Marcelo
DF	8	Rômulo
MF	5	Sandro	(substituted off) 64'
MF	10	Oscar
FW	11	Neymar
FW	12	Hulk	(substituted off) 87'
FW	17	Alexandre Pato	(substituted off) 85'
Substitutions:
MF	16	Ganso	(substituted on) 64'
FW	7	Lucas Moura	(substituted on) 85'
DF	14	Danilo	(substituted on) 87'
Manager:
Mano Menezes

GK	1	Alyaksandr Hutar
DF	3	Ihar Kuzmyanok
DF	4	Syarhey Palitsevich
DF	12	Alyaksey Kazlow	(yellow card) 14'	(substituted off) 80'
DF	17	Dzyanis Palyakow
MF	2	Stanislaw Drahun (c)	(yellow card) 80'
MF	5	Dzmitry Baha
MF	10	Renan Bressan
MF	13	Illya Aleksiyevich		(substituted off) 70'
MF	16	Mikhail Gordeichuk
FW	8	Sergei Kornilenko		(substituted off) 78'
Substitutions:
FW	11	Andrey Varankow		(substituted on) 70'
FW	14	Yahor Zubovich		(substituted on) 78'
DF	6	Alyaksey Hawrylovich		(substituted on) 80'
Manager:
Georgi Kondratiev

Assistant referees:
Toru Sagara (Japan)
Toshiyuki Nagi (Japan)
Fourth official:
Slim Jedidi (Tunisia)

=== Brazil vs New Zealand ===
1 August 2012
14:30

Brazil	3–0	New Zealand
Danilo 23'; Damião 29'; Sandro 52'	Report

St James' Park, Newcastle
Attendance: 25,201
Referee: Bakary Gassama (Gambia)

Brazil	New Zealand

GK	1	Gabriel
DF	2	Rafael
DF	3	Thiago Silva (c)
DF	4	Juan Jesus
DF	6	Marcelo
MF	5	Sandro		(substituted off) 82'
MF	14	Danilo
MF	15	Alex Sandro	(yellow card) 71' (yellow-red card) 76'
FW	7	Lucas Moura
FW	9	Leandro Damião		(substituted off) 80'
FW	11	Neymar		(substituted off) 76'
Substitutions:
FW	17	Alexandre Pato		(substituted on) 76'
MF	10	Oscar		(substituted on) 80'
DF	8	Rômulo		(substituted on) 82'
Manager:
Mano Menezes

GK	18	Michael O'Keeffe
DF	5	Tommy Smith
DF	6	Ryan Nelsen (c)
DF	3	Ian Hogg	(yellow card) 55'
DF	12	Adam Thomas		(substituted off) 46'
MF	7	Kosta Barbarouses		(substituted off) 46'
MF	8	Michael McGlinchey
MF	2	Tim Payne
FW	11	Marco Rojas		(substituted off) 82'
FW	9	Shane Smeltz
FW	10	Chris Wood
Substitutions:
MF	15	Cameron Howieson		(substituted on) 46'
DF	4	Tim Myers	(yellow card) 51'	(substituted on) 46'
FW	16	Dakota Lucas		(substituted on) 82'
Manager:
(United Kingdom) Neil Emblen

Assistant referees:
Jason Damoo (Seychelles)
Angesom Ogbamariam (Eritrea)
Fourth official:
Mark Geiger (United States)

=== Egypt vs Belarus ===
1 August 2012
14:30

Egypt	3–1	Belarus
Salah 56'; Mohsen 73'; Aboutrika 79'	Report	Varankow 87'

Hampden Park, Glasgow
Attendance: 8,732
Referee: Roberto García (Mexico)

Egypt	Belarus

GK	1	Ahmed El Shenawy
DF	15	Saad Samir
DF	12	Islam Ramadan
DF	7	Ahmed Fathy	(substituted off) 69'
DF	6	Ahmed Hegazy
MF	17	Mohamed El-Nenny
MF	14	Hossam Hassan
MF	8	Shehab Ahmed	(substituted off) 46'
FW	5	Mohamed Aboutrika (c)
FW	10	Emad Moteab	(substituted off) 77'
FW	11	Mohamed Salah
Substitutions:
FW	9	Marwan Mohsen	(substituted on) 46'
DF	4	Omar Gaber	(substituted on) 69'
MF	13	Saleh Gomaa	(substituted on) 77'
Manager:
Hany Ramzy

GK	1	Alyaksandr Hutar
DF	17	Dzyanis Palyakow
DF	12	Alyaksey Kazlow		(substituted off) 69'
DF	4	Syarhey Palitsevich
DF	3	Ihar Kuzmyanok
MF	16	Mikhail Gordeichuk		(substituted off) 60'
MF	13	Illya Aleksiyevich
MF	10	Renan Bressan		(substituted off) 75'
MF	5	Dzmitry Baha
MF	2	Stanislaw Drahun (c)
FW	8	Sergei Kornilenko	(yellow card) 90+2'
Substitutions:
MF	15	Artsyom Salavey		(substituted on) 60'
FW	11	Andrey Varankow		(substituted on) 69'
FW	19	Maksim Skavysh		(substituted on) 75'
Manager:
Georgi Kondratiev

Assistant referees:
José Luis Camargo (Mexico)
Alberto Morín (Mexico)
Fourth official:
Raúl Orosco (Bolivia)
