= Football at the 2012 Summer Olympics – Men's qualification =

The men's qualification for the 2012 Summer Olympics. FIFA restricted entry to players born after 1 January 1989.

== Qualifications ==
A total of 16 teams participated in the finals of the Olympic tournament for men. Of the six regional confederations, three (CONCACAF, AFC and OFC) ran dedicated qualification competitions for the Olympic tournament, while the other three used their own existing youth tournaments as qualifiers.

- The host nation (automatically qualified)
  - Great Britain
- Three teams from Europe
  - Spain
  - Switzerland
  - Belarus
- Two teams from South America
  - Brazil
  - Uruguay
- Two teams from North America, Central America, and the Caribbean
  - Mexico
  - Honduras
- Three teams from Africa
  - Gabon
  - Morocco
  - Egypt
- Three teams from Asia
  - Japan
  - South Korea
  - United Arab Emirates
- One team from Oceania
  - New Zealand
- Winner of the Asia–Africa play-off
  - Senegal

== UEFA (Europe) ==
UEFA announced that the 2011 UEFA European Under-21 Football Championship tournament in Denmark would also serve as the qualifying tournament for the Olympics. Spain, Switzerland and Belarus qualified for the Olympic tournament.

== CONMEBOL (South America) ==
The 2011 South American Youth Championship tournament in Peru, held in January–February 2011, served as the qualifying tournament for the Olympics. Brazil and Uruguay finished first and second, respectively, and qualified for the Olympic tournament.

== CONCACAF (North, Central America and Caribbean) ==
The CONCACAF Pre-Olympic tournament was held from the 22 March to the 2 April 2012 in the United States, and saw Mexico and Honduras qualify.

== CAF (Africa) ==
The 2011 Confederation of African Football Under-23 Championship tournament held in Morocco between 26 November and 10 December 2011 doubled up as a qualifying tournament for the Olympics. Egypt, Gabon and Morocco qualified. Senegal went into a play-off with the fourth-placed team from the AFC qualifiers, Oman and gained the final place in the Olympic tournament.

== AFC (Asia) ==
The Asian Pre-Olympic tournament took place over a total of four rounds between February 2011 and March 2012. After the third round, South Korea, Japan and United Arab Emirates gained qualification to the Olympic tournament, while three other sides advanced to the fourth round. From these, Oman went into a further play-off against Senegal, but lost and thus failed to qualify.

== OFC (Oceania) ==
The OFC Olympic Tournament was held between the 16 and 25 March 2012 in New Zealand, and saw New Zealand qualify for the Olympics.
