= Sergey Politevich =

Belarusian footballer

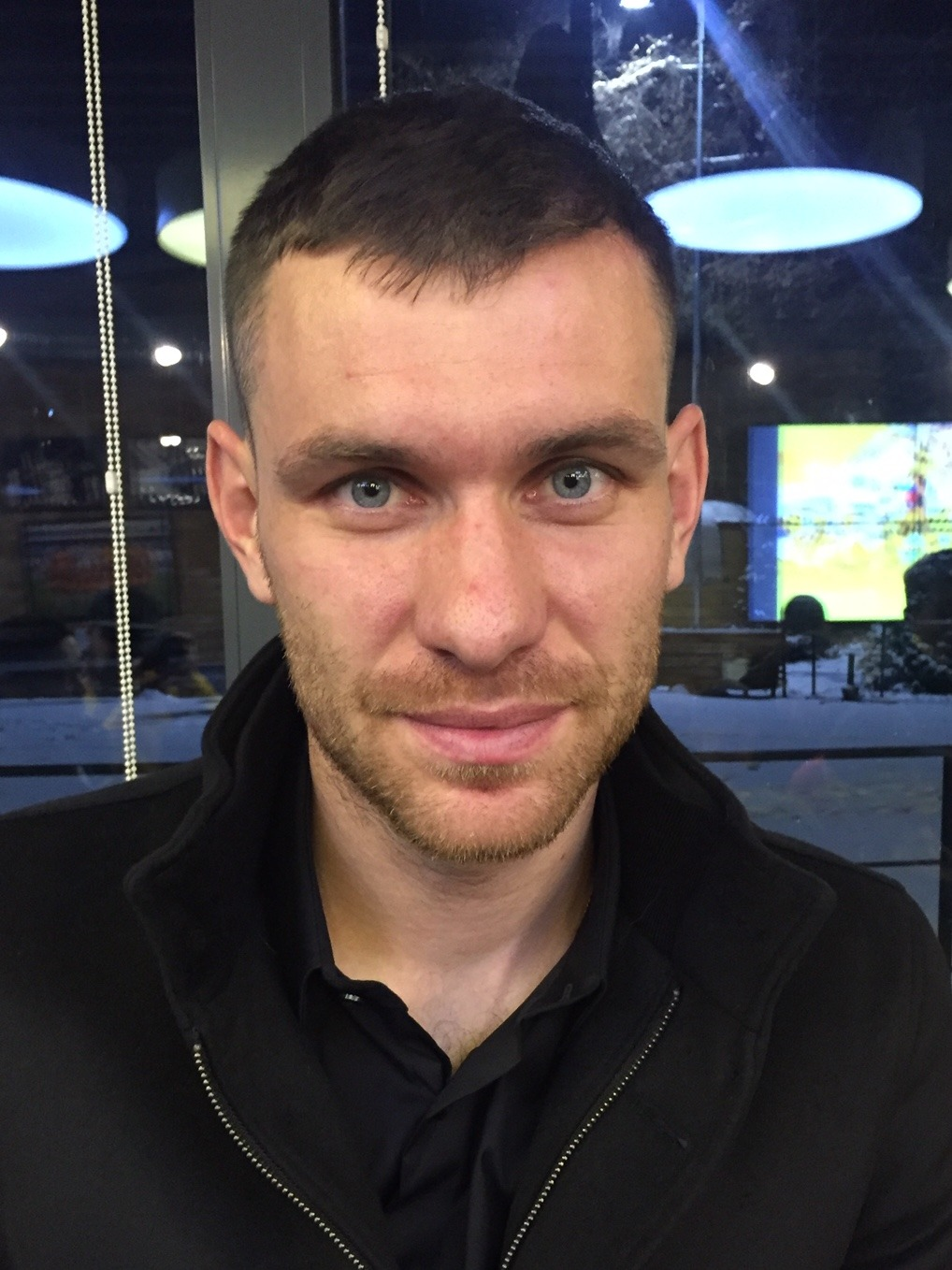
- Politevich in 2018

Personal information
- Full name: Sergey Eduardovich Politevich
- Date of birth: 9 April 1990 (age 36)
- Place of birth: Lida, Grodno Oblast, Belarusian SSR, Soviet Union
- Height: 1.90 m (6 ft 3 in)
- Position: Centre-back

Youth career
- MTZ-RIPO Minsk

Senior career*
Years	Team	Apps	(Gls)
2007	Naftan Novopolotsk	11	(1)
2008–2010	Krylia Sovetov Samara	0	(0)
2009–2010	→ Naftan Novopolotsk (loan)	41	(6)
2011–2015	Dinamo Minsk	131	(8)
2016–2018	Gençlerbirliği	62	(1)
2018–2019	Kairat	17	(0)
2020–2022	Shakhtyor Soligorsk	32	(4)
2023–2024	Dinamo Minsk	34	(3)
2025	Torpedo-BelAZ Zhodino	9	(0)

International career^{‡}
2009–2012	Belarus U21	31	(0)
2011–2012	Belarus Olympic	8	(0)
2014–	Belarus	52	(2)
- * Club domestic league appearances and goals as of 1 December 2025 ‡ National team caps and goals as of 10 June 2025

Sergey Eduardovich Politevich (Belarusian: Сяргей Эдуардавіч Паліцевіч; Russian: Сергей Эдуардович Политевич; born 9 April 1990) is a Belarusian former professional footballer who played as a centre-back. He has appeared for the Belarus national team and the national U21 squad.

== Club career ==
He began his senior club career with Naftan Novopolotsk in Belarus before moving abroad to Russia, where he joined Krylia Sovetov Samara. However, he did not make any official first-team appearances for the Russian side. Politevich returned to Belarus and signed with Dinamo Minsk, where he became a regular starter and established himself as a key member of the squad. In 2016, he moved to Turkey to play for Gençlerbirliği S.K. gaining experience in the Süper Lig. After his stint in Turkey, On 10 July 2018, FC Kairat announced the signing of Politevich., continuing his career abroad. Later, he returned to Belarus to play for Shakhtyor Soligorsk, before rejoining Dinamo Minsk in the 2023–2024 seasons. In January 2025, Politevich signed with Torpedo-BelAZ Zhodino. In December 2025, he retired and became club's director of sports.

== International career ==
Politevich was part of the Belarus U21 team that finished in 3rd place at the 2011 UEFA European Under-21 Football Championship. Politevich missed only one game at the finals due to yellow card accumulation. He was a member of the Belarus Olympic side that participated in the 2012 Toulon Tournament as well as the 2012 Olympic tournament in London, where he played in all three first-round matches. Politevich made his debut for the Belarus national team on 21 May 2014, in the 5–1 win against Liechtenstein in a friendly match.

== Career statistics ==
#	Date	Venue	Opponent	Score	Result	Competition
1.	9 November 2016	Karaiskakis Stadium, Piraeus, Greece	Greece	0–1	Win	Friendly
Correct as of 22 November 2015

== Honours ==
Shakhtyor Soligorsk

- Belarusian Premier League: 2020, 2021
