= Hossam Hassan (disambiguation) =

Hossam Hassan (born 1966) is an Egyptian football manager and former player.

Hossam Hassan may also refer to:

- Hossam Hassan (footballer, born 1989)
- Hossam Hassan (footballer, born 1993)
