= Belarus national under-23 football team =

Belarus Under-23
- Association: Football Federation of Belarus
- Confederation: UEFA (Europe)
- Head coach: Georgy Kondratyev
First colours	Second colours

First international
- Estonia 2–1 Belarus (Ta' Qali, Malta; 14 February 2004)

Biggest win
- Malta 0–4 Belarus (Ta' Qali, Malta; 18 February 2004)

Biggest defeat
- France 3–1 Belarus (Aubagne, France; 24 May 2012); Brazil 3–1 Belarus (Manchester, Great Britain; 29 July 2012); Egypt 3–1 Belarus (Glasgow, Great Britain; 1 August 2012)

Summer Olympics
- Appearances: 1 (first in 2012)
- Best result: Group Stage (2012)

The Belarus national under-23 football team (also known as Belarus Olympic, Belarus U-23) represented Belarus in international football competitions in Olympic Games. The selection is limited to players under the age of 23 however the Olympics allows for the addition of up to three overage players. The team is controlled by the Football Federation of Belarus (BFF). Belarus made its first appearance in football at the 2012 Olympics in London.

== History ==
=== 2004 Malta Tournament ===
The Belarusian Olympic team was assembled for the very first time at the 2004 Malta International Football Tournament and was composed of the members of the Belarus U-21 team.

=== 2012 Toulon Tournament ===
Belarus was invited to participate in 2012 Toulon Tournament along with a four other under-23 teams preparing for upcoming 2012 Olympic Tournament (Egypt, Morocco, Mexico and Japan), two European under-21 teams (Turkey, Netherlands) and under-20 team of the host nation France. Belarus failed to advance to the knockout round and was eliminated after three games of tournament's group stage.

=== 2012 Summer Olympics ===
Belarus made its debut at the 2012 Olympic Football Tournament in London after securing third place at the 2011 UEFA European Under-21 Football Championship.

== Competitive Record ==
=== Olympic Games ===
Host nation / Year	Result	GP	W	D*	L	GS	GA
(Greece) 1896	No football tournament was held						
(France) 1900	Part of Russian Empire						
(United States) 1904	Part of Russian Empire						
(United Kingdom) 1908	Part of Russian Empire						
(Sweden) 1912	Part of Russian Empire						
(Belgium) 1920	did not enter						
(France) 1924	Part of Soviet Union						
(Netherlands) 1928	Part of Soviet Union						
(United States) 1932	No football tournament was held						
(Nazi Germany) 1936	Part of Soviet Union						
(United Kingdom) 1948	Part of Soviet Union						
(Finland) 1952	Part of Soviet Union						
(Australia) 1956	Part of Soviet Union						
(Italy) 1960	Part of Soviet Union						
(Japan) 1964	Part of Soviet Union						
(Mexico) 1968	Part of Soviet Union						
(West Germany) 1972	Part of Soviet Union						
(Canada) 1976	Part of Soviet Union						
(Soviet Union) 1980	Part of Soviet Union						
(United States) 1984	Part of Soviet Union						
(South Korea) 1988	Part of Soviet Union						
(Spain) 1992	Part of Unified Team						
(United States) 1996	did not qualify						
(Australia) 2000	did not qualify						
(Greece) 2004	did not qualify						
(China) 2008	did not qualify						
(United Kingdom) 2012	10/16	3	1	0	2	3	6
(Brazil) 2016	did not qualify						
(Japan) 2020	did not qualify						
(France) 2024	did not qualify						
(United States) 2028	TBD						
(Australia) 2032	TBD						
Total	1/28	3	1	0	2	3	6

*Denotes draws including knockout matches decided on penalty kicks.

== Fixtures and results ==
2012 Olympic tournament

26 July 2012
19:45

Belarus	1–0	New Zealand
Baha 45+1'	Report

City of Coventry Stadium, Coventry
Attendance: 14,457
Referee: Bakary Gassama (Gambia)

2012 Olympic tournament

29 July 2012
15:00

Brazil	3–1	Belarus
Pato 15'; Neymar 65'; Oscar 90+3'	Report	Bressan 8'

Old Trafford, Manchester
Attendance: 66,212
Referee: Yuichi Nishimura (Japan)

2012 Olympic tournament

1 August 2012
14:30

Egypt	3–1	Belarus
Salah 56'; Mohsen 73'; Aboutrika 79'	Report	Varankow 87'

Hampden Park, Glasgow
Attendance: 8,732
Referee: Roberto García (Mexico)

== 2012 Olympic squad ==
The following players were named for 18-man squad for 2012 Summer Olympics.

Caps and goals correct as of 1 August 2012, after the game with Egypt.

No.	Pos.	Player	Date of birth (age)	Caps	Goals	Club
1	GK	Alyaksandr Hutar	April 18, 1989 (aged 23)	10	0	(Football Federation of Belarus) BATE Borisov
18	GK	Andrey Shcharbakow	January 31, 1991 (aged 21)	0	0	(Football Federation of Belarus) BATE Borisov
3	DF	Ihar Kuzmyanok	July 6, 1990 (aged 22)	6	0	(Football Federation of Belarus) Gomel
4	DF	Syarhey Palitsevich	April 9, 1990 (aged 22)	8	0	(Football Federation of Belarus) Dinamo Minsk
6	DF	Alyaksey Hawrylovich	January 5, 1990 (aged 22)	7	0	(Football Federation of Belarus) Naftan Novopolotsk
7	DF	Maksim Vitus**	February 11, 1989 (aged 23)	5	0	(Football Federation of Belarus) Neman Grodno
12	DF	Alyaksey Kazlow	July 11, 1989 (aged 23)	7	1	(Football Federation of Belarus) Torpedo-BelAZ Zhodino
17	DF	Dzyanis Palyakow	April 17, 1991 (aged 21)	5	0	(Football Federation of Belarus) BATE Borisov
2	MF	Stanislaw Drahun	June 4, 1988 (aged 24)	8	1	(Football Federation of Belarus) Dinamo Minsk
5	MF	Dzmitry Baha	January 4, 1990 (aged 22)	8	1	(Football Federation of Belarus) BATE Borisov
10	MF	Renan Bressan	November 3, 1988 (aged 23)	4	1	(Football Federation of Belarus) BATE Borisov
13	MF	Illya Aleksiyevich	February 10, 1991 (aged 21)	7	0	(Football Federation of Belarus) Gomel
15	MF	Artsyom Salavey	November 1, 1990 (aged 21)	7	0	(Football Federation of Belarus) Torpedo-BelAZ Zhodino
16	MF	Mikhail Gordeichuk	October 23, 1989 (aged 22)	10	0	(Football Federation of Belarus) Belshina Bobruisk
8	FW	Sergei Kornilenko	June 14, 1983 (aged 29)	4	0	(Russian Football Union) Krylia Sovetov Samara
9	FW	Uladzimir Khvashchynski	May 10, 1990 (aged 22)	6	1	(Football Federation of Belarus) Brest
11	FW	Andrey Varankow	February 8, 1989 (aged 23)	7	1	(Football Federation of Belarus) Neman Grodno
14	FW	Yahor Zubovich	January 6, 1989 (aged 23)	7	1	(Football Federation of Belarus) Naftan Novopolotsk
19	FW	Maksim Skavysh**	November 13, 1989 (aged 22)	5	0	(Football Federation of Belarus) Belshina Bobruisk

** Maksim Skavysh, originally a reserve player, has replaced Maksim Vitus, who sustained an injury in pre-tournament friendly and withdrew from the squad.

=== Reserves ===
The following players have been named as possible replacements in case any player from the main squad is injured.

No.	Pos.	Player	Date of birth (age)	Caps	Goals	Club
20	DF	Aleh Veratsila	July 10, 1988 (aged 24)	6	0	(Football Federation of Belarus) Dinamo Minsk
21	DF	Vital Hayduchyk	July 12, 1989 (aged 23)	4	0	(Football Federation of Belarus) Brest
22	GK	Filip Vaytekhovich	March 26, 1990 (aged 22)	0	0	(Swedish Football Association) IK Frej

== See also ==
- Belarus national football team
- Belarus national under-21 football team
- Belarus national under-19 football team
- Belarus national under-17 football team
