= Alyaksandr Hutar =

Belarusian footballer

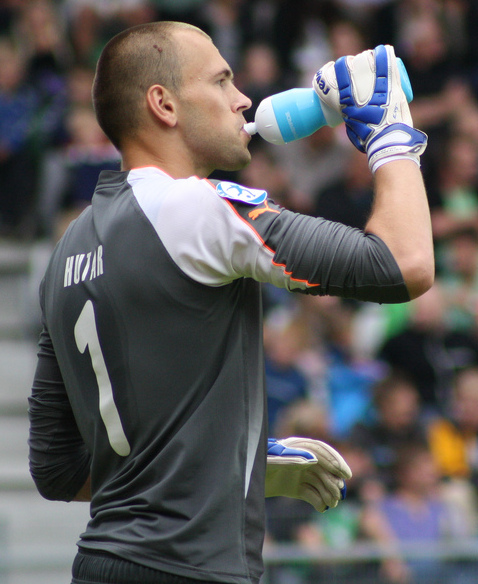
- Hutar with Belarus U-21 in the 2011 UEFA European Under-21 Football Championship

Personal information
- Full name: Alyaksandr Pyatrovich Hutar
- Date of birth: 18 April 1989 (age 37)
- Place of birth: Minsk, Belarusian SSR, Soviet Union
- Height: 1.90 m (6 ft 3 in)
- Position: Goalkeeper

Team information
- Current team: Minsk
- Number: 30

Youth career
- 2006–2008: BATE Borisov

Senior career*
Years	Team	Apps	(Gls)
2008–2012	BATE Borisov	48	(0)
2013–2016	Dinamo Minsk	87	(0)
2016–2017	Orenburg	12	(0)
2017	Tosno	0	(0)
2017	Chornomorets Odesa	12	(0)
2018–2019	Dinamo Brest	49	(0)
2020–2021	Shakhtyor Soligorsk	48	(0)
2023	Aksu	3	(0)
2023	BATE Borisov	0	(0)
2024–	Minsk	47	(0)

International career^{‡}
2009–2011	Belarus U21	22	(0)
2011–2012	Belarus Olympic	10	(0)
2013–2021	Belarus	21	(0)
- * Club domestic league appearances and goals as of 6 July 2026 ‡ National team caps and goals as of 30 March 2021

Alyaksandr Pyatrovich Hutar (Belarusian: Аляксандр Пятровiч Гутар; Russian: Александр Петрович Гутор; born 18 April 1989) is a Belarusian professional footballer who plays for Minsk.

== Club career ==
While playing for Chornomorets Odesa, in September 2017 Hutar was recognized as a player of the month in the Ukrainian Premier League.

== International ==
Hutar was the starting goaltender for the Belarus U21 side that finished in 3rd place at the 2011 UEFA European Under-21 Football Championship and earned qualification for the 2012 Summer Olympics. In July 2011, he received his first call-up to the senior team for the friendly match against Bulgaria, but was not selected to play. Hutar was the main goalkeeper for the Belarus U23 team that participated in the 2012 Toulon Tournament. He made his debut for the senior national team on 25 March 2013, keeping a clean sheet in the 2:0 win over Canada in a friendly match.

== Honours ==
=== Club ===
BATE Borisov

- Belarusian Premier League champion: 2008, 2009, 2010, 2011, 2012
- Belarusian Cup winner: 2009–10
- Belarusian Super Cup winner: 2010, 2011

Dinamo Brest

- Belarusian Premier League champion: 2019
- Belarusian Cup winner: 2017–18
- Belarusian Super Cup winner: 2018, 2019

Shakhtyor Soligorsk

- Belarusian Premier League champion: 2020, 2021
- Belarusian Super Cup winner: 2021

=== Individual ===
- Belarusian Footballer of the Year: 2011
- Ukrainian Premier League player of the Month: 2017–18 (September)
