= Innocent Emeghara =

Swiss footballer (born 1989)

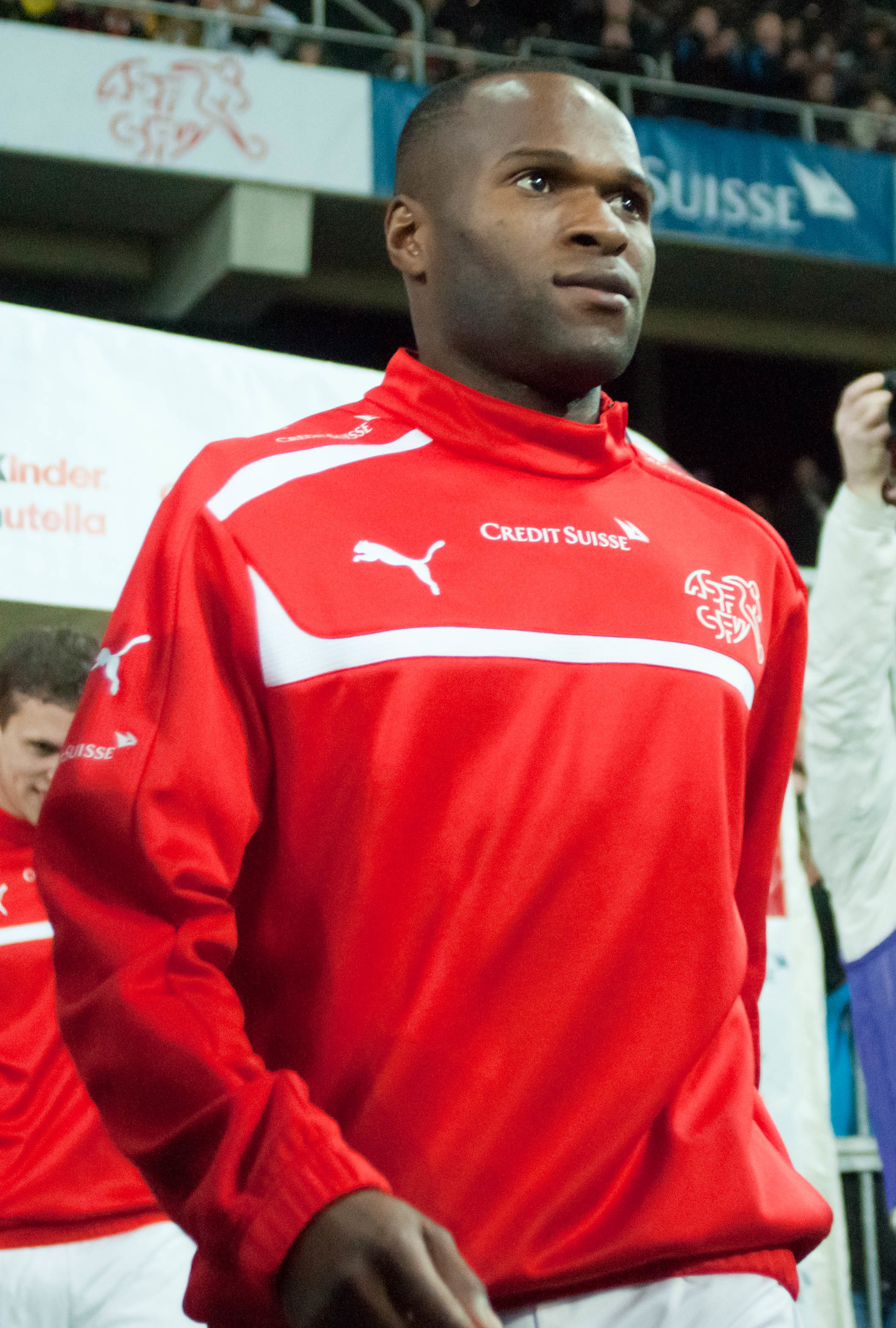
- Emeghara with Switzerland in 2012

Personal information
- Full name: Innocent Nkasiobi Emeghara
- Date of birth: 27 May 1989 (age 37)
- Place of birth: Lagos, Nigeria
- Height: 1.72 m (5 ft 7 1/2 in)
- Position: Striker

Youth career
- 2002–2003: FC Töss 1906
- 2003–2006: Winterthur

Senior career*
Years	Team	Apps	(Gls)
2006–2009	Zürich II	47	(16)
2009–2010	Winterthur	28	(17)
2010–2011	Grasshoppers	40	(14)
2011–2013	Lorient	28	(5)
2013–2014	Siena	17	(7)
2013–2014	→ Livorno (loan)	30	(4)
2014–2015	Qarabağ	8	(5)
2015–2016	San Jose Earthquakes	13	(1)
2017–2018	Ermis	28	(9)
2018–2019	Qarabağ	11	(5)
2019–2020	Fatih Karagümrük	31	(7)
2020–2021	FC Winterthur	15	(1)

International career^{‡}
2011	Switzerland U21	8	(5)
2012	Switzerland Olympic	4	(1)
2011–2013	Switzerland	9	(0)
- * Club domestic league appearances and goals as of 16 March 2021 ‡ National team caps and goals as of 23 March 2013

Innocent Nkasiobi Emeghara (born 27 May 1989) is a retired professional footballer who played most commonly as a striker. Born in Nigeria, he represented Switzerland internationally.

== Club career ==
Born in Lagos, Nigeria, his mother moved to Switzerland when Emeghara was 11, and joined with them two years later. He started playing football as a means to "cope with the language barrier and cold temperatures". He began his senior career with FC Zürich's reserves aged only 17, going on to represent FC Winterthur and Grasshopper Club Zürich; on 20 August 2011, whilst at the service of the latter, he scored a hat-trick in a 4–3 away win against Servette FC, which meant he led the Super League's scoring charts at five in only six games.

On 31 August 2011, Emeghara was sold to FC Lorient in France. He made his debut in Ligue 1 on 10 September, coming on as a substitute for Mathias Autret in a 1–1 draw at FC Sochaux-Montbéliard and netting the equalizer two minutes from time. He scored four more league goals until the end of his first season, adding two in the Coupe de la Ligue.

In January 2013, Emeghara moved teams and countries again, joining Italian side A.C. Siena. He scored four goals in as many matches to kickstart his Serie A career, including a brace in a 3–0 home success over S.S. Lazio on 18 February; his team, however, finally suffered relegation after ranking second from bottom.

For the 2013–2014 campaign, Emeghara continued in Italy's top flight, being loaned to A.S. Livorno Calcio. On 31 March 2014, he contributed with one goal to help the hosts come from behind to tie it 2–2 with Inter Milan.

In July 2014, Emeghara became a free agent after Siena went into liquidation. On 11 October he signed a three-year contract with Azerbaijan Premier League side FK Qarabağ, but left on 5 January of the following year and began training with Winterthur, before going on trial with HSV Hamburg the following week.

Late into January 2015, Emeghara joined the San Jose Earthquakes. He made his debut in the Major League Soccer on 8 March, playing one minute in a 0–1 away loss against FC Dallas.

On 24 July 2018, Emeghara returned to Qarabağ on a two-year deal from Ermis Aradippou FC, but was released early from his contract by mutual consent on 13 May 2019.

In October 2020, after he trained already three weeks with the club, Emeghara signed a two-year contract at his home-based club FC Winterthur, where he launched his career back in 2010. His contract with Winterthur was terminated by the club in July 2021. He consequently retired from professional football.

== International career ==
Emeghara opted to represent Switzerland internationally, and he made his debut on 4 June 2011 by playing one minute in a 2–2 draw in England for the UEFA Euro 2012 qualifiers.

In that same year, he helped the under-21 team finish second at the 2011 UEFA European Championship, scoring in the 2–0 group stage win against Iceland. He represented the country at the 2012 Summer Olympics, netting in the 1–2 group phase defeat by South Korea.

== Career statistics ==
=== Club ===
As of match played 11 September 2021

Appearances and goals by club, season and competition
Club	Season	League			National Cup		League Cup		Continental		Other		Total	
Club	Season	Division	Apps	Goals	Apps	Goals	Apps	Goals	Apps	Goals	Apps	Goals	Apps	Goals
Zürich II	2006–07	Swiss 1. Liga	6	2			–		–		–		6	2
Zürich II	2007–08	Swiss 1. Liga	15	5			–		–		–		15	5
Zürich II	2008–09	Swiss 1. Liga	26	9			–		–		–		26	9
Zürich II	Total		47	16			-	-	-	-	-	-	47	16
Winterthur	2009–10	Swiss Challenge League	28	17	3	5	–		–		–		31	22
Grasshoppers	2010–11	Swiss Super League	33	9	4	1	–		2 (Note: Appearances in UEFA Champions League)	0	–		39	10
Grasshoppers	2011–12	Swiss Super League	7	5	0	0	–		–		–		7	5
Grasshoppers	Total		40	14	4	1	-	-	2	0	-	-	46	15
Lorient	2011–12	Ligue 1	27	5	1	0	3	2	–		–		31	7
Lorient	2012–13	Ligue 1	1	0	0	0	0	0	–		–		1	0
Lorient	Total		28	5	1	0	3	2	-	-	-	-	32	7
Siena	2012–13	Serie A	17	7	0	0	–		–		–		17	7
Siena	2013–14	Serie B	0	0	0	0	–		–		–		0	0
Siena	Total		17	7	0	0	-	-	-	-	-	-	17	7
Livorno (loan)	2013–14	Serie A	30	4	0	0	–		–		–		30	4
Qarabağ	2014–15	Azerbaijan Premier League	7	4	1	1	–		0	0	0	0	8	5
San Jose Earthquakes	2015	Major League Soccer	7	1	0	0	–		–		–		7	1
San Jose Earthquakes	2016	Major League Soccer	6	0	1	0	–		–		–		7	0
San Jose Earthquakes	Total		13	1	1	0	-	-	-	-	-	-	14	1
Ermis	2017–18	Cypriot First Division	28	9	2	0	–		–		–		30	9
Qarabağ	2018–19	Azerbaijan Premier League	11	5	0	0	–		7 (Note: Three appearances in UEFA Champions League, four appearances in UEFA Europa League)	0	–		18	5
Fatih Karagümrük	2019–20	TFF First League	31	7	1	0	–		–		–		32	7
Winterthur	2020–21	Swiss Challenge League	15	1	0	0	–		–		–		15	1
Career total			295	90	13	7	3	2	9	0	0	0	320	99

=== International ===
As of 23 March 2013

Switzerland
Year	Apps	Goals
2011	5	0
2012	3	0
2013	1	0
Total	9	0
