= Yūki Ōtsu =

Japanese footballer (born 1990)

Yūki Ōtsu 大津 祐樹
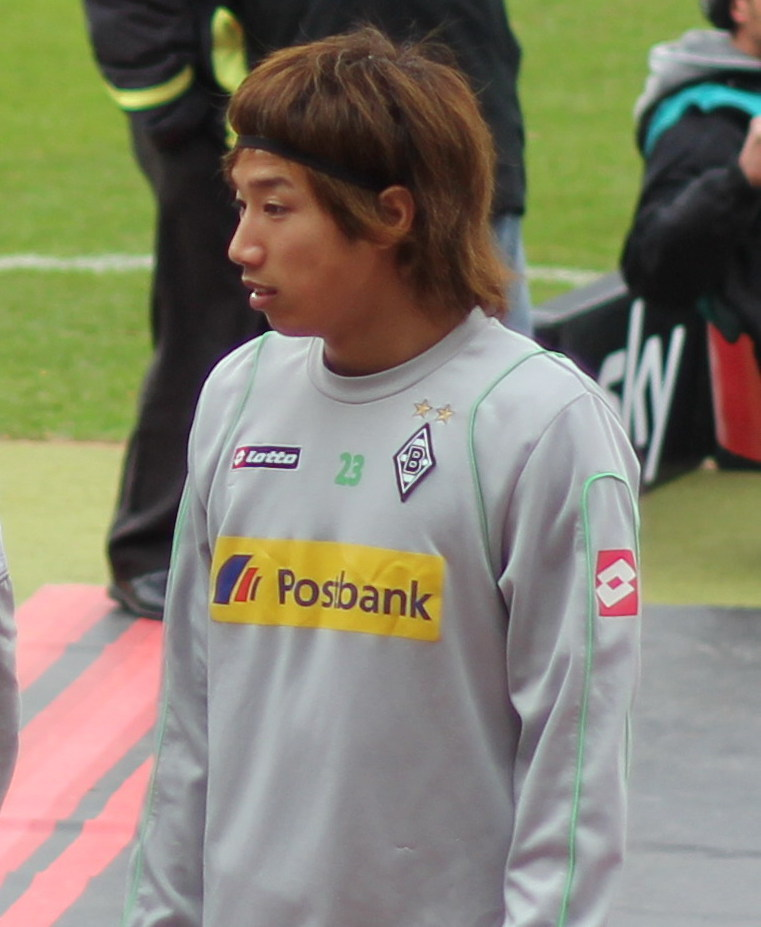
- Ōtsu with Borussia Mönchengladbach in 2012

Personal information
- Full name: Yūki Ōtsu
- Date of birth: 24 March 1990 (age 36)
- Place of birth: Mito, Ibaraki, Japan
- Height: 1.80 m (5 ft 11 in)
- Positions: Attacking midfielder; winger

Youth career
- 1998–2001: Shinsho Tokiwa SSS
- 2002–2004: Kashima Antlers
- 2005–2008: Seiritsu Gakuen High School

Senior career*
| Years | Team | Apps | (Gls) |
| 2008–2011 | Kashiwa Reysol | 66 | (7) |
| 2011–2012 | Borussia Mönchengladbach | 3 | (0) |
| 2011–2012 | Borussia Mönchengladbach II | 9 | (0) |
| 2012–2015 | VVV-Venlo | 50 | (6) |
| 2015–2017 | Kashiwa Reysol | 49 | (3) |
| 2018–2020 | Yokohama F. Marinos | 60 | (1) |
| 2021–2023 | Júbilo Iwata | 77 | (9) |
| Total | | 305 | (26) |

International career
| 2011–2012 | Japan U-23 | 16 | (6) |
| 2013 | Japan | 2 | (0) |
Medal record
Kashiwa Reysol
| Winner | J1 League | 2011 |
| Runner-up | Emperor's Cup | 2008 |
Yokohama F. Marinos
| Runner-up | J.League Cup | 2018 |
| Winner | J1 League | 2019 |
Júbilo Iwata
| Winner | J2 League | 2021 |
- * Club domestic league appearances and goals

Yūki Ōtsu (大津 祐樹, Ōtsu Yūki; born 24 March 1990) is a Japanese former professional footballer who played as an attacking midfielder or a winger.

== Club career ==
=== Borussia Mönchengladbach ===
On 21 July 2011, Ōtsu was signed by Bundesliga side Borussia Mönchengladbach on a three-year contract. He made his league debut on 22 October 2011, coming on as a late substitute for Mike Hanke, in a 1–0 away defeat against 1899 Hoffenheim.

=== VVV-Venlo ===
After having lost prospect with Borussia Mönchengladbach, Ōtsu signed with Dutch Eredivisie side VVV-Venlo until the summer of 2014 on 31 August 2012. He was supposed to succeed his countryman Keisuke Honda who had impressed and made a transfer to AC Milan half a year earlier. However, on 15 December 2013, Ōtsu badly injured his achilles tendon. After a long rehabilitation, Ōtsu became fit again and VVV-Venlo extended his expiring contract until the summer of 2015.

=== Return to Kashiwa Reysol ===
On 13 December 2014, it was announced that Otsu would leave VVV-Venlo in the winter transfer window. He had signed a deal with his former team Kashiwa Reysol.

== International career ==
On 2 July 2012, Japan U23 manager Takashi Sekizuka included Ōtsu in the Japan under-23s for the 2012 Summer Olympics. He made his debut in their opening match on 26 July 2012 against Spain at Hampden Park, Glasgow, where he scored the opening and winning goal. He then went on to score in both Japan's quarter-final and semi-final against Egypt and Mexico respectively. On 31 January 2013, head coach Alberto Zaccheroni included Ōtsu in the Japan national team for a friendly against Latvia. On 6 February 2013, Ōtsu made his debut for the national team, replacing Shinji Okazaki in the 82nd minute.

== Career statistics ==
=== Club ===
Appearances and goals by club, season and competition
| Club | Season | League | | | National Cup (Note: Appearances in Emperor's Cup, DFB-Pokal and KNVB Cup) | | League Cup (Note: Appearances in J. League Cup) | | Continental (Note: Appearances in AFC Champions League) | | Other (Note: Appearances in Japanese Super Cup) | | Total | |
| Club | Season | Division | Apps | Goals | Apps | Goals | Apps | Goals | Apps | Goals | Apps | Goals | Apps | Goals |
|---|---|---|---|---|---|---|---|---|---|---|---|---|---|---|
| Kashiwa Reysol | 2008 | J.League Division 1 | 14 | 0 | 2 | 0 | 3 | 0 | – | | – | | 19 | 0 |
| Kashiwa Reysol | 2009 | J.League Division 1 | 33 | 6 | 1 | 0 | 5 | 2 | – | | – | | 39 | 8 |
| Kashiwa Reysol | 2010 | J.League Division 2 | 9 | 1 | 1 | 0 | – | | – | | – | | 10 | 1 |
| Kashiwa Reysol | 2011 | J.League Division 1 | 10 | 0 | 0 | 0 | 1 | 0 | – | | – | | 11 | 0 |
| Kashiwa Reysol | 2015 | J1 League | 14 | 1 | 2 | 0 | 1 | 0 | 8 | 0 | – | | 25 | 1 |
| Kashiwa Reysol | 2016 | J1 League | 19 | 1 | 4 | 0 | 1 | 0 | – | | – | | 24 | 1 |
| Kashiwa Reysol | 2017 | J1 League | 16 | 1 | 4 | 0 | 3 | 0 | – | | – | | 23 | 1 |
| Kashiwa Reysol | Total | | 115 | 10 | 14 | 0 | 14 | 2 | 8 | 0 | – | | 151 | 12 |
| Borussia Mönchengladbach | 2011–12 | Bundesliga | 3 | 0 | 1 | 0 | – | | – | | – | | 4 | 0 |
| VVV-Venlo | 2012–13 | Eredivisie | 22 | 1 | 1 | 0 | – | | – | | – | | 23 | 1 |
| VVV-Venlo | 2013–14 | Eerste Divisie | 20 | 4 | 2 | 0 | – | | – | | – | | 22 | 4 |
| VVV-Venlo | 2014–15 | Eerste Divisie | 8 | 1 | 1 | 0 | – | | – | | – | | 9 | 1 |
| VVV-Venlo | Total | | 50 | 6 | 4 | 0 | – | | – | | – | | 54 | 6 |
| Yokohama F. Marinos | 2018 | J1 League | 25 | 1 | 2 | 0 | 9 | 2 | – | | – | | 36 | 3 |
| Yokohama F. Marinos | 2019 | J1 League | 23 | 0 | 3 | 1 | 6 | 2 | – | | – | | 32 | 3 |
| Yokohama F. Marinos | 2020 | J1 League | 12 | 0 | 0 | 0 | 0 | 0 | 3 | 0 | 0 | 0 | 15 | 0 |
| Yokohama F. Marinos | Total | | 60 | 1 | 5 | 1 | 15 | 4 | 3 | 0 | 0 | 0 | 83 | 6 |
| Júbilo Iwata | 2021 | J2 League | 40 | 6 | 2 | 0 | – | | – | | – | | 42 | 6 |
| Júbilo Iwata | 2022 | J1 League | 26 | 3 | 1 | 0 | 3 | 0 | – | | – | | 30 | 3 |
| Júbilo Iwata | 2023 | J2 League | 11 | 0 | 0 | 0 | 3 | 0 | – | | – | | 14 | 0 |
| Júbilo Iwata | Total | | 77 | 9 | 3 | 0 | 6 | 0 | 0 | 0 | 0 | 0 | 86 | 9 |
| Career total | | | 305 | 26 | 27 | 1 | 35 | 6 | 11 | 0 | 0 | 0 | 378 | 33 |

=== International ===
Appearances and goals by national team and year
| National team | Year | Apps | Goals |
|---|---|---|---|
| Japan U23 | 2011 | 3 | 2 |
| Japan U23 | 2012 | 11 | 4 |
| Total | | 14 | 6 |
| Japan | 2013 | 2 | 0 |
| Total | | 2 | 0 |

Scores and results list Japan U23's goal tally first, score column indicates score after each Ōtsu goal.

List of international goals scored by Yūki Ōtsu
| No. | Date | Venue | Opponent | Score | Result | Competition |
|---|---|---|---|---|---|---|
| 1 | 22 November 2011 | Bahrain National Stadium, Manama, Bahrain | Bahrain | 1–0 | 2–0 | 2012 Summer Olympics qualification |
| 2 | 27 November 2011 | National Olympic Stadium, Tokyo, Japan | Syria | 2–1 | 2–1 | 2012 Summer Olympics qualification |
| 3 | 21 July 2012 | City Ground, West Bridgford, England | Mexico | 2–1 | 2–1 | Friendly |
| 4 | 26 July 2012 | Hampden Park, Glasgow, Scotland | Spain | 1–0 | 1–0 | 2012 Summer Olympics |
| 5 | 4 August 2012 | Old Trafford, Manchester, England | Egypt | 3–0 | 3–0 | 2012 Summer Olympics |
| 6 | 7 August 2012 | Wembley Stadium, London, England | Mexico | 1–0 | 1–3 | 2012 Summer Olympics |

== Honours ==
Kashiwa Reysol

- J. League Division 2: 2010

Yokohama F.Marinos

- J1 League: 2019

Júbilo Iwata

- J2 League: 2021
