= Milo (footballer) =

Egyptian footballer (born 1990)

Personal information
- Full name: Islam Mohamed Ramadan Rashad
- Date of birth: 1 November 1990 (age 35)
- Place of birth: Alexandria, Egypt
- Height: 1.79 m (5 ft 10 in)
- Position: Left back

Team information
- Current team: Ala'ab Damanhour

Youth career
- Haras El Hodood

Senior career*
Years	Team	Apps	(Gls)
2008–2016	Haras El Hodood	117	(2)
2013	→ Ahli Tripoli (loan)		
2016–2017	El Entag El Harby	4	(0)
2017	El Raja	3	(0)
2018–2019	Olympic		
2019–	Ala'ab Damanhour		

International career^{‡}
2008–2010	Egypt U-20	15	(1)
2010–2013	Egypt U-23	43	(5)
- * Club domestic league appearances and goals ‡ National team caps and goals as of 5

Islam Mohamed Ramadan Rashad (Arabic: إسلام محمد رمضان رشاد) (born 1 November 1990), known as Milo, is an Egyptian footballer. He plays as a left back for Egyptian Premier League side ZED FC.

== Career ==
On 28 May 2012, it was announced that French Ligue 1 giants Olympique Lyonnais had shown interest in the player after showing a phenomenal performance at the 2012 Toulon Tournament in France. Sporting CP and S.L. Benfica, along with Premier League giants Arsenal, had also begun to show interest in signing the player after another good performance at the 2012 Arab Nations Cup, despite Egypt's poor finish in the regional tournament. Ramadan was surprised that these many clubs had so much interest in him and later expressed his desire that he would like to join Arsenal. He played for Egypt at the 2012 Summer Olympics.

In the summer 2019, Milo joined Ala'ab Damanhour SC. He later would move on to join ZED FC.
