= Aleksey Gavrilovich =

Belarusian footballer

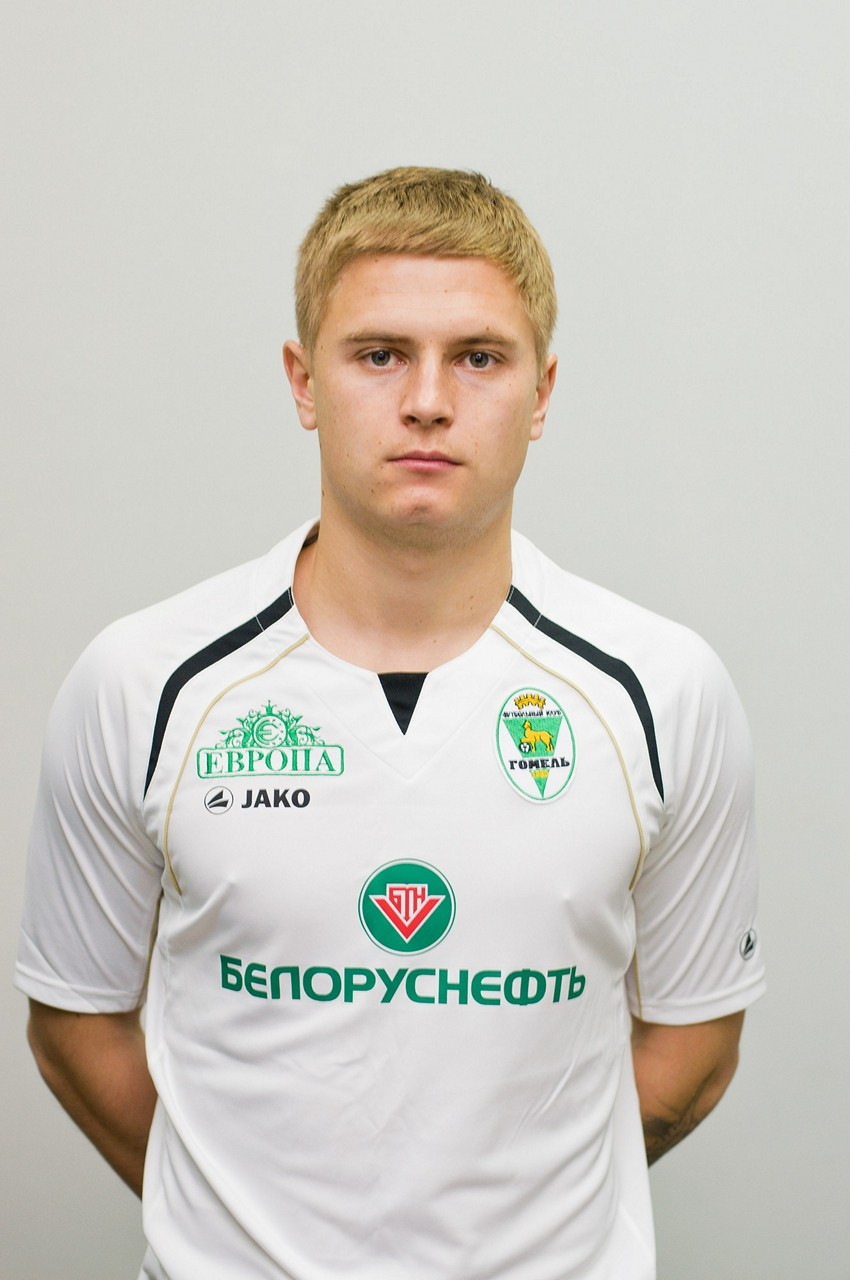

Personal information
- Full name: Aleksey Viktorovich Gavrilovich
- Date of birth: 5 January 1990 (age 36)
- Place of birth: Pinsk, Byelorussian SSR, Soviet Union
- Height: 1.84 m (6 ft 0 in)
- Position: Defender

Team information
- Current team: Gomel (on loan from Dinamo Minsk)
- Number: 4

Youth career
- 2008–2009: Dinamo Minsk

Senior career*
Years	Team	Apps	(Gls)
2009–2012	Dinamo Minsk	32	(0)
2012	→ Naftan Novopolotsk (loan)	25	(0)
2013–2015	Gomel	71	(1)
2015	Slutsk	12	(0)
2016	Belshina Bobruisk	14	(1)
2016–2018	Dinamo Brest	46	(1)
2018–2019	Dinamo Minsk	35	(2)
2020	Okzhetpes	16	(0)
2021	Neman Grodno	5	(0)
2021–2022	Chayka Peschanokopskoye	26	(1)
2022–2023	Volgar Astrakhan	19	(1)
2023–	Dinamo Minsk	40	(10)
2026–	→ Gomel (loan)	10	(0)

International career^{‡}
2010–2012	Belarus U21	12	(0)
2011–2012	Belarus Olympic	7	(0)
2017–	Belarus	4	(0)
- * Club domestic league appearances and goals as of 6 July 2026 ‡ National team caps and goals as of 25 March 2025

Aleksey Viktorovich Gavrilovich (Belarusian: Аляксей Віктаравіч Гаўрыловіч; Russian: Алексей Викторович Гаврилович; born 5 January 1990) is a Belarusian professional football player who plays for Gomel on loan from Dinamo Minsk.

== Club career ==
On 10 June 2021, he signed a 2-year contract with Russian Football National League club Chayka Peschanokopskoye.

== International career ==
He played for the Belarus Olympic football team at the 2012 Summer Olympics.

== Honours ==
Naftan Novopolotsk

- Belarusian Cup winner: 2011–12

Dinamo Brest

- Belarusian Cup winner: 2016–17, 2017–18
- Belarusian Super Cup winner: 2018
