= Artsyom Salavey =

Belarusian footballer

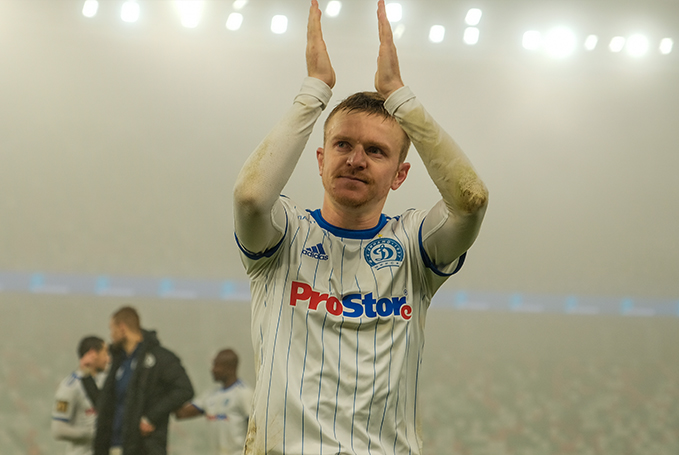

Personal information
- Full name: Artsyom Viktaravich Salavey
- Date of birth: 1 November 1990 (age 36)
- Place of birth: Selovschina, Byaroza Raion, Brest Oblast, Belarusian SSR
- Height: 1.70 m (5 ft 7 in)
- Position: Midfielder

Youth career
- 2007–2008: Dinamo Minsk

Senior career*
Years	Team	Apps	(Gls)
2008–2010	Dinamo Minsk	14	(0)
2010	→ Torpedo Zhodino (loan)	21	(1)
2011–2012	Torpedo-BelAZ Zhodino	58	(14)
2013	Ural Sverdlovsk Oblast	1	(0)
2013–2014	Neman Grodno	17	(0)
2015–2017	Vitebsk	80	(16)
2018	Dinamo Minsk	23	(4)
2019–2020	Torpedo-BelAZ Zhodino	17	(2)
2020	Shakhtyor Soligorsk	0	(0)
2020	→ Gorodeya (loan)	7	(0)
2021	Sputnik Rechitsa	9	(0)

International career
2010–2012	Belarus U21	7	(0)
2011–2012	Belarus Olympic	7	(0)
2017	Belarus B	2	(0)
- * Club domestic league appearances and goals as of 31 December 2021

Artsyom Viktaravich Salavey (Belarusian: Арцём Віктаравіч Салавей; Russian: Артём Викторович Соловей; born 1 November 1990) is a Belarusian former professional footballer.

His brother Andrey Salavey is also a professional footballer.

== Career ==
Born in Byaroza Raion, Salavey began playing football in FC Dinamo Minsk's youth system. He joined the senior team and made his Belarusian Premier League debut in 2008.
