= Maksim Skavysh =

Belarusian footballer

Maksim Skavysh Максім Скавыш
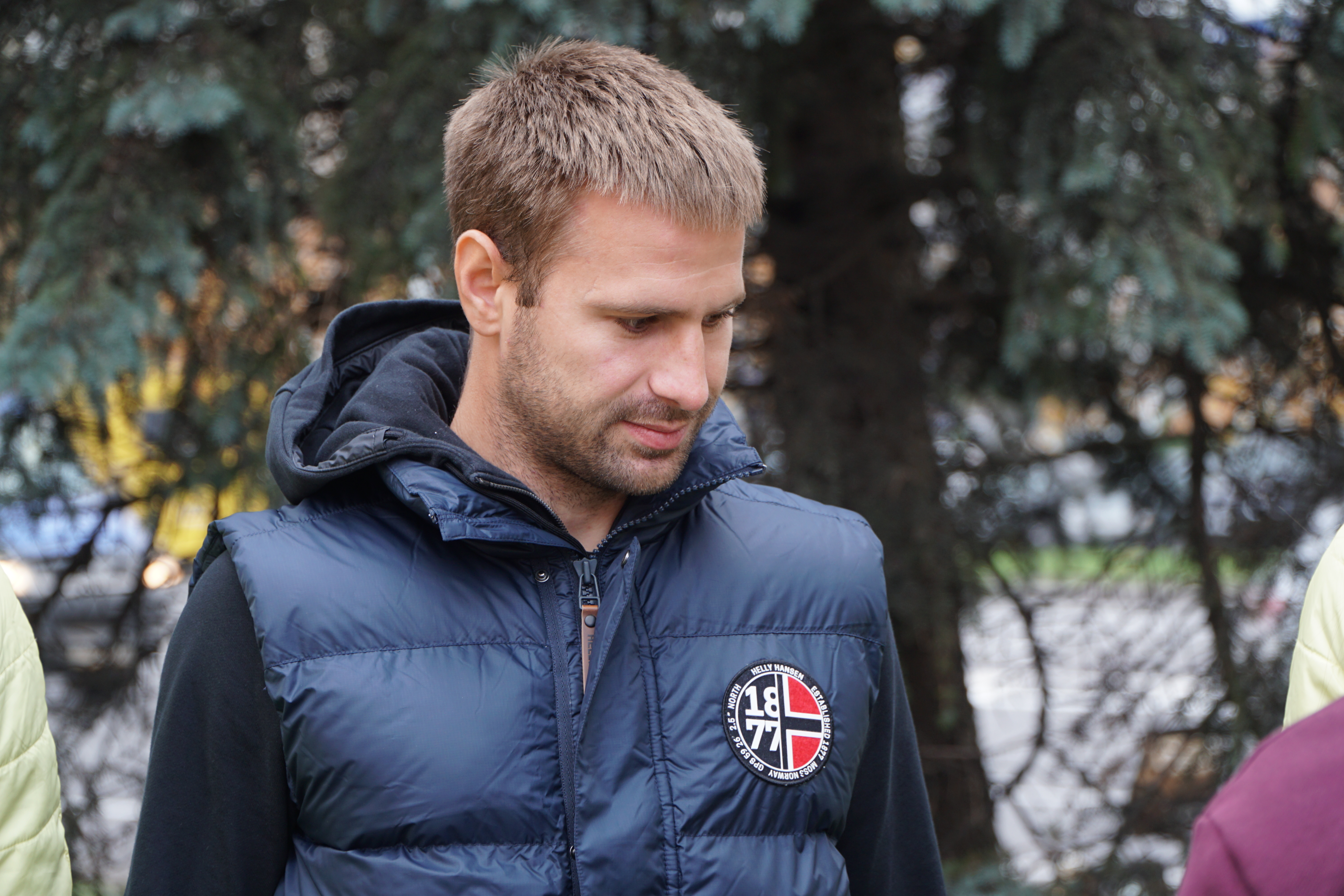

Personal information
- Full name: Maksim Petrovich Skavysh
- Date of birth: 13 November 1989 (age 36)
- Place of birth: Minsk, Belarusian SSR, Soviet Union
- Height: 1.79 m (5 ft 10 in)
- Position: Forward

Youth career
- 2007–2008: BATE Borisov

Senior career*
Years	Team	Apps	(Gls)
2007–2013	BATE Borisov	68	(30)
2012	→ Belshina Bobruisk (loan)	30	(5)
2013	→ Baltika Kaliningrad (loan)	11	(3)
2013–2015	Baltika Kaliningrad	46	(4)
2015–2016	Torpedo-BelAZ Zhodino	26	(8)
2016	Hapoel Kfar Saba	8	(0)
2017	Torpedo-BelAZ Zhodino	30	(9)
2018–2021	BATE Borisov	98	(49)
2021–2023	Shakhtyor Soligorsk	68	(20)
2024–2025	Torpedo-BelAZ Zhodino	50	(20)
Total		435	(148)

International career^{‡}
2008–2011	Belarus U21	28	(5)
2011–2012	Belarus Olympic	5	(0)
2013–2023	Belarus	33	(4)
- * Club domestic league appearances and goals as of 1 December 2025 ‡ National team caps and goals as of 21 November 2023

Maksim Petrovich Skavysh (Belarusian: Максім Пятровіч Скавыш; Russian: Максим Петрович Скавыш; born 13 November 1989) is a Belarusian former professional footballer.

== Career ==
Skavysh began his playing career with BATE's reserve team, and joined the first team during the 2008 season when the club won the league.

Skavysh was a member of the Belarus U21 that finished in 3rd place at the 2011 UEFA European Under-21 Football Championship. He played in all five of the matches and scored in the 2:0 group stage win against Iceland U21. He also represented the Belarus Olympic team that participated in the 2012 Toulon Tournament and the 2012 Summer Olympics.

He made his debut for the Belarus national football team on 3 June 2013, in a friendly match against Estonia.

=== International goals ===
Scores and results list Belarus' goal tally first.

No	Date	Venue	Opponent	Score	Result	Competition
1.	27 March 2018	Stožice Stadium, Ljubljana, Slovenia	Slovenia	1–0	2–0	Friendly
2.	6 September 2019	A. Le Coq Arena, Tallinn, Estonia	Estonia	2–1	2–1	UEFA Euro 2020 qualification
3.	18 November 2020	Arena Kombëtare, Tirana, Albania	Albania	1–2	2–3	2020–21 UEFA Nations League C
4.	2 June 2021	Dinamo Stadium, Minsk, Belarus	Azerbaijan	1–0	1–2	Friendly

== Honours ==
BATE Borisov

- Belarusian Premier League: 2007, 2008, 2009, 2010, 2011, 2012, 2018
- Belarusian Cup: 2009–10, 2019–20, 2020–21
- Belarusian Super Cup: 2010, 2011

Torpedo-BelAZ Zhodino

- Belarusian Cup: 2015–16

Shakhtyor Soligorsk

- Belarusian Premier League: 2021
- Belarusian Super Cup: 2023
