= Maksym Bilyi (footballer, born 1989) =

Ukrainian footballer

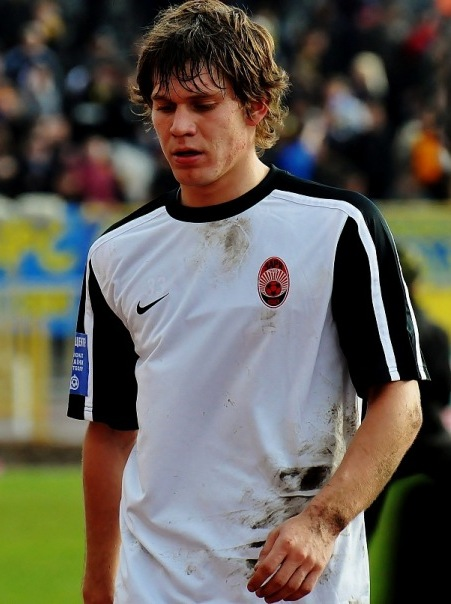

Personal information
- Full name: Maksym Ivanovych Bilyi
- Date of birth: 27 April 1989
- Place of birth: Novomoskovsk, Soviet Union (now Ukraine)
- Date of death: 14 September 2013 (aged 24)
- Place of death: Novomoskovsk, Ukraine
- Height: 1.77 m (5 ft 10 in)
- Position: Midfielder

Youth career
- 2002: Shakhtar Donetsk
- 2003–2006: ISTA Dnipropetrovsk

Senior career*
Years	Team	Apps	(Gls)
2006	Metalist Kharkiv	0	(0)
2006–2009	Kharkiv	52	(4)
2009–2010	Metalurh Zaporizhzhia	1	(0)
2010–2013	Zorya Luhansk	63	(7)
Total		116	(11)

International career^{‡}
2005	Ukraine U16	2	(1)
2006–2007	Ukraine U18	9	(1)
2008	Ukraine U19	7	(0)
2009–2011	Ukraine U21	10	(3)
- * Club domestic league appearances and goals as of 14 September 2013 ‡ National team caps and goals as of 14 September 2013

Maksym Ivanovych Bilyi (Ukrainian: Максим Іванович Білий; 27 April 1989 – 14 September 2013) was a Ukrainian football midfielder.

== Career ==
He was born in Novomoskovsk, Dnipropetrovsk Oblast, Ukrainian SSR.

He played for Zorya Luhansk in the Ukrainian Premier League.

he was called up to Ukraine national under-21 football team.

He died on 14 September 2013 from a brain tumor. He was survived by a wife and two children.
