= Alyaksey Kazlow =

Belarusian footballer

Personal information
- Date of birth: 11 July 1989 (age 37)
- Place of birth: Minsk, Belarusian SSR
- Height: 1.76 m (5 ft 9 1/2 in)
- Position: Midfielder

Youth career
- 2004–2005: Smena Minsk

Senior career*
Years	Team	Apps	(Gls)
2005–2006	Smena Minsk	31	(5)
2007	Minsk	5	(0)
2008–2013	Torpedo-BelAZ Zhodino	118	(2)
2014–2015	Belshina Bobruisk	49	(6)
2016	Dinamo Minsk	4	(0)
2017	Naftan Novopolotsk	19	(1)
2018	Orsha	12	(0)

International career
2009–2011	Belarus U21	3	(0)
2011–2012	Belarus Olympic	7	(1)
- * Club domestic league appearances and goals as of 31 December 2018

Alyaksey Kazlow (Belarusian: Аляксей Казлоў; Russian: Алексей Козлов; born 11 July 1989) is a Belarusian professional footballer. He played for Belarus in all three of their games at the 2012 Summer Olympics.

In 2020 Kazlow was found guilty of being involved in a match-fixing schema in Belarusian football. He was sentenced to 2 years of prison.
