= Hossam Hassan (footballer, born 1989) =

Egyptian footballer

Personal information
- Full name: Hossam Hassan Muhammad Abdalla
- Date of birth: 30 April 1989 (age 37)
- Place of birth: Rod El Farag, Cairo, Egypt
- Height: 1.74 m (5 ft 9 in)
- Positions: Defensive midfielder; right midfielder

Team information
- Current team: Ceramica Cleopatra

Youth career
- ENPPI

Senior career*
Years	Team	Apps	(Gls)
2009–2014	Al Masry	35	(6)
2012–2013	→ Çaykur Rizespor (loan)	25	(5)
2014–2015	Gil Vicente	23	(7)
2015	→ El Ittihad (loan)	14	(2)
2015–2016	Smouha SC	17	(0)
2016–2017	El Sharkia	32	(8)
2017–2018	Al Mokawloon	1	(0)
2018–2019	Wej SC		
2019–	Ceramica Cleopatra		

International career^{‡}
2008–2010	Egypt U-20	32	(5)
2010–2012	Egypt U-23	56	(3)
2011–	Egypt	4	(0)
- * Club domestic league appearances and goals as of 25 January 2016 ‡ National team caps and goals as of March 19, 2018

Hossam Hassan Mohamed Abdalla (Arabic: حسام حسن محمد عبدالله; born April 30, 1989, in Cairo, Egypt) is an Egyptian footballer who plays as a midfielder for Smouha SC. He is the older brother of Ibrahim Hassan.

Hassan was included in Hany Ramzy's Egypt U-23 team for the 2012 Summer Olympics in London. He performed well as a central defensive midfielder. His good showing earned a loan move to Turkish Second division side Çaykur Rizespor on loan for one year.
