= Football at the 2012 Summer Olympics – Men's tournament =

2012 Men's Olympic Football Tournament

Tournament details
- Host country: United Kingdom
- Dates: 26 July – 11 August
- Teams: 16 (from 6 confederations)
- Venues: 6 (in 6 host cities)

Final positions
- Champions: Mexico (1st title)
- Runners-up: Brazil
- Third place: South Korea
- Fourth place: Japan

Tournament statistics
- Matches played: 32
- Goals scored: 76 (2.38 per match)
- Attendance: 1,525,134 (47,660 per match)
- Top scorer(s): (Brazil) Leandro Damião (6 goals)

The men's football tournament at the 2012 Summer Olympics was held in London and five other cities in Great Britain from 26 July to 11 August. Associations affiliated with FIFA were invited to enter their men's U-23 teams in regional qualifying competitions, from which 15 teams, plus the hosts Great Britain, reached the final tournament. Men's teams were allowed to augment their squads with three players over the age of 23. It was the first men's Olympic football tournament to feature a team representing Great Britain since the 1960 Summer Olympics in Rome. The competition also marked Uruguay's men's football team's first Olympic appearance since 1928, when it won its second consecutive gold medal.

The gold medal was won by Mexico who defeated Brazil 2–1 in the final.

== Schedule ==
The match schedule of the men's tournament.

Legend
G	Group stage	¼	Quarter-finals	½	Semi-finals	B	Bronze medal match	F	Gold medal match

26 Thu	27 Fri	28 Sat	29 Sun	30 Mon	31 Tue	1 Wed	2 Thu	3 Fri	4 Sat	5 Sun	6 Mon	7 Tue	8 Wed	9 Thu	10 Fri	11 Sat
G			G			G			¼			½			B	F

== Qualification ==
Each National Olympic Committee may enter one men's team in the football tournament. The 2004 and 2008 Olympic gold-medallists Argentina failed to qualify, after finishing third in the South American qualifying tournament.

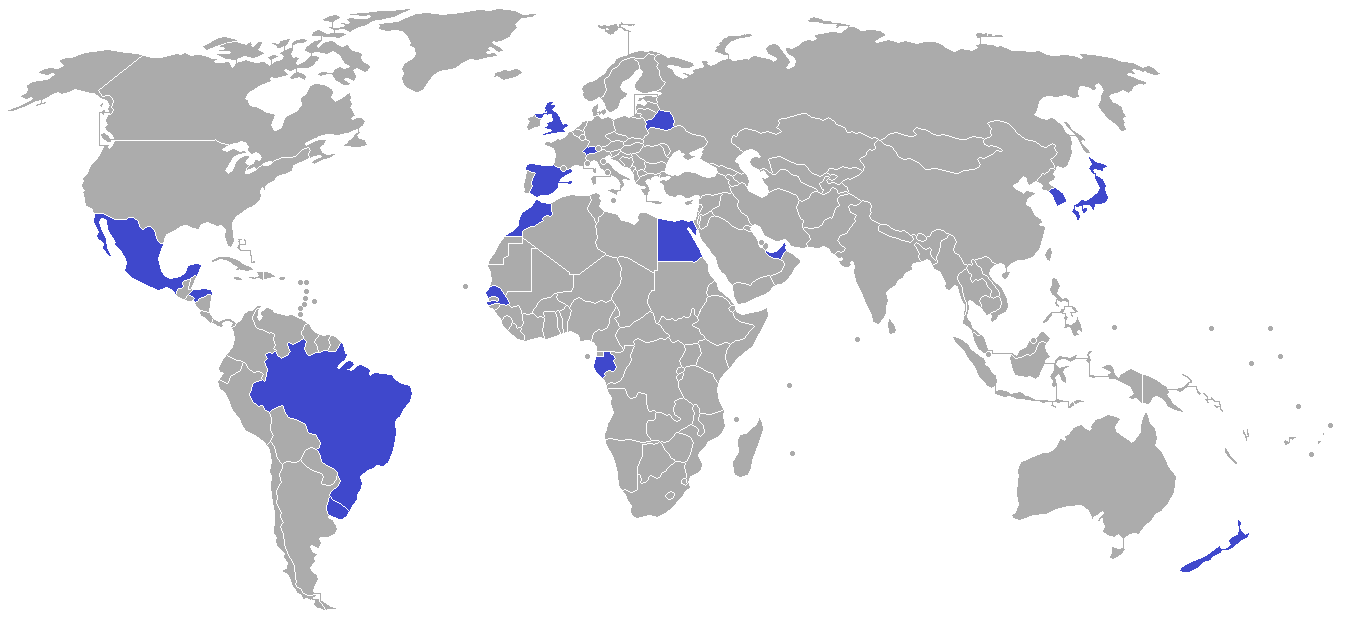
Participating countries

Means of qualification	Date of completion	Venue^{1}	Berths	Qualified
Host nation	2005	—	1	Great Britain
2011 UEFA European Under-21 Football Championship	25 June 2011	Denmark	3	Spain; Switzerland; Belarus
AFC Preliminary Competition	29 March 2012	Various (home and away format)	3	Japan; South Korea; United Arab Emirates
2011 CAF U-23 Championship	10 December 2011	Morocco	3	Gabon; Morocco; Egypt
CONCACAF Preliminary Competition	2 April 2012	United States	2	Mexico; Honduras
2011 South American Youth Championship	12 February 2011	Peru	2	Brazil; Uruguay
OFC Preliminary Competition	25 March 2012	New Zealand	1	New Zealand
AFC–CAF play-off	23 April 2012	(United Kingdom) Great Britain	1	Senegal
Total			16	

- ^1Locations are those of final tournaments, various qualification stages may precede matches at these specific venues.

== Venues ==
Six venues were used during the tournament, including Wembley Stadium in London, which hosted the final.

London	Manchester	Cardiff	Location of the host cities of the men's football tournament of the 2012 Summer Olympics.
Wembley Stadium	Old Trafford	Millennium Stadium	Location of the host cities of the men's football tournament of the 2012 Summer Olympics.
Capacity: 90,000	Capacity: 75,643	Capacity: 74,500	Location of the host cities of the men's football tournament of the 2012 Summer Olympics.
Newcastle	Glasgow	Coventry	Location of the host cities of the men's football tournament of the 2012 Summer Olympics.
St James' Park	Hampden Park	City of Coventry Stadium	Location of the host cities of the men's football tournament of the 2012 Summer Olympics.
Capacity: 52,354	Capacity: 51,866	Capacity: 32,609	Location of the host cities of the men's football tournament of the 2012 Summer Olympics.

== Squads ==
For the men's tournament, each nation submitted a squad of 18 players, 15 of whom had to be born on or after 1 January 1989, and three of whom could be overage players. A minimum of two goalkeepers (plus one optional alternate goalkeeper) had to be included in the squad.

== Match officials ==
On 19 April 2012, FIFA released the list of match referees that would officiate at the Olympics.

Confederation	Referee	Assistants
AFC	Ravshan Irmatov (Uzbekistan)	Abdukhamidullo Rasulov (Uzbekistan); Bakhadyr Kochkarov (Kyrgyzstan)
AFC	Yuichi Nishimura (Japan)	Toru Sagara (Japan); Toshiyuki Nagi (Japan)
AFC	Ben Williams (Australia)	Matthew Cream (Australia); Hakan Anaz (Australia)
CAF	Bakary Gassama (Gambia)	Jason Damoo (Seychelles); Angesom Ogbamariam (Eritrea)
CAF	Slim Jedidi (Tunisia)	Bechir Hassani (Tunisia); Sherif Hassan (Egypt)
CONCACAF	Roberto García (Mexico)	José Luis Camargo (Mexico); Alberto Morín (Mexico)
CONCACAF	Mark Geiger (United States)	Mark Hurd (United States); Joe Fletcher (Canada)
CONMEBOL	Raúl Orosco (Bolivia)	Efraín Castro (Bolivia); Arol Valda (Bolivia)
CONMEBOL	Wilmar Roldán (Colombia)	Humberto Clavijo (Colombia); Eduardo Díaz (Colombia)
CONMEBOL	Juan Soto (Venezuela)	Jorge Urrego (Venezuela); Carlos López (Venezuela)
OFC	Peter O'Leary (New Zealand)	Jan-Hendrik Hintz (New Zealand); Ravinesh Kumar (Fiji)
UEFA	Felix Brych (Germany)	Stefan Lupp (Germany); Mark Borsch (Germany)
UEFA	Mark Clattenburg (Great Britain)	Stephen Child (Great Britain); Simon Beck (Great Britain)
UEFA	Pavel Královec (Czech Republic)	Martin Wilczek (Czech Republic); Antonín Kordula (Czech Republic)
UEFA	Svein Oddvar Moen (Norway)	Kim Haglund (Norway); Frank Andas (Norway)
UEFA	Gianluca Rocchi (Italy)	Elenito Di Liberatore (Italy); Gianluca Cariolato (Italy)

== Draw ==
The draw for the tournament took place on 24 April 2012. Great Britain, Mexico, Brazil and Spain were seeded for the draw and placed into groups A–D, respectively. The remaining teams were drawn from four pots with teams from the same region kept apart.

Pot 1	Pot 2	Pot 3	Pot 4
Great Britain (assigned to A1); Spain (assigned to D1); Switzerland; Belarus	Brazil (assigned to C1); Uruguay; Mexico (assigned to B1); Honduras	Japan; South Korea; United Arab Emirates; New Zealand	Egypt; Morocco; Gabon; Senegal

== Group stage ==
The competing countries were divided into four groups of four teams, denoted as groups A, B, C and D. Teams in each group will play one another in a round-robin basis, with the top two teams of each group advancing to the quarter-finals.

All times are local, British Summer Time (UTC+1).

=== Group A ===
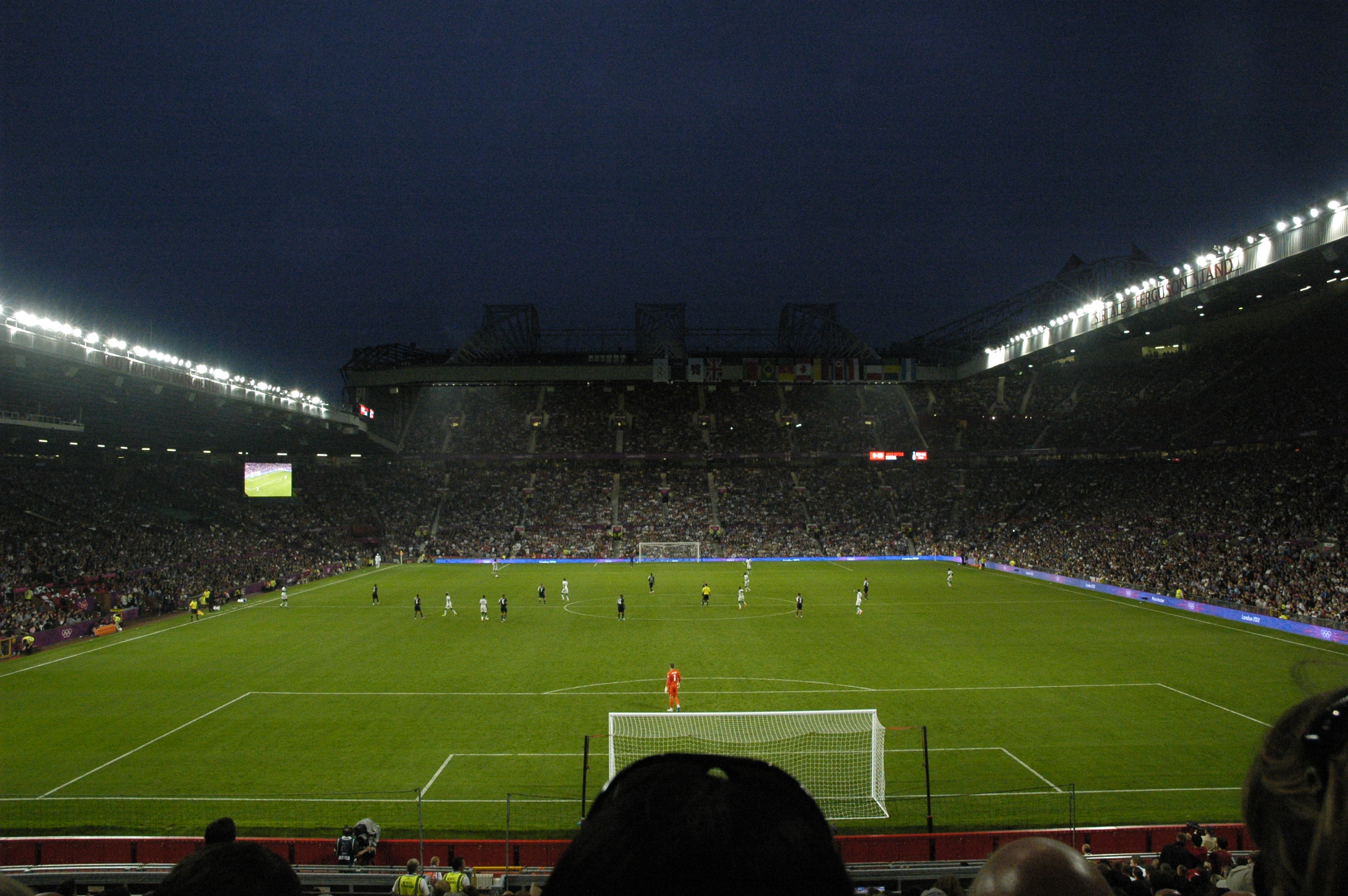
The match of Great Britain against Senegal in Old Trafford, Manchester

Pos	Team	Pld	W	D	L	GF	GA	GD	Pts	Qualification
1	Great Britain (H)	3	2	1	0	5	2	+3	7	Advance to knockout stage
2	Senegal	3	1	2	0	4	2	+2	5	Advance to knockout stage
3	Uruguay	3	1	0	2	2	4	−2	3	
4	United Arab Emirates	3	0	1	2	3	6	−3	1	

Source: FIFA
(H) Hosts
26 July 2012
17:00

United Arab Emirates	1–2	Uruguay
Matar 23'	Report	Ramírez 42'; Lodeiro 56'

Old Trafford, Manchester
Attendance: 51,745
Referee: Peter O'Leary (New Zealand)
26 July 2012
20:00

Great Britain	1–1	Senegal
Bellamy 20'	Report	Konaté 82'

Old Trafford, Manchester
Attendance: 72,176
Referee: Ravshan Irmatov (Uzbekistan)

29 July 2012
17:00

Senegal	2–0	Uruguay
Konaté 10', 37'	Report

Wembley Stadium, London
Attendance: 75,093
Referee: Felix Brych (Germany)
29 July 2012
19:45

Great Britain	3–1	United Arab Emirates
Giggs 16'; Sinclair 73'; Sturridge 76'	Report	Eisa 60'

Wembley Stadium, London
Attendance: 85,137
Referee: Roberto García (Mexico)

1 August 2012
19:45

Senegal	1–1	United Arab Emirates
Konaté 49'	Report	Matar 21'

City of Coventry Stadium, Coventry
Attendance: 28,652
Referee: Svein Oddvar Moen (Norway)
1 August 2012
19:45

Great Britain	1–0	Uruguay
Sturridge 45+1'	Report

Millennium Stadium, Cardiff
Attendance: 70,438
Referee: Yuichi Nishimura (Japan)

=== Group B ===
Pos	Team	Pld	W	D	L	GF	GA	GD	Pts	Qualification
1	Mexico	3	2	1	0	3	0	+3	7	Advance to knockout stage
2	South Korea	3	1	2	0	2	1	+1	5	Advance to knockout stage
3	Gabon	3	0	2	1	1	3	−2	2	
4	Switzerland	3	0	1	2	2	4	−2	1	

Source: FIFA
26 July 2012
14:30

Mexico	0–0	South Korea
	Report

St James' Park, Newcastle
Attendance: 15,748
Referee: Slim Jedidi (Tunisia)
26 July 2012
17:15

Gabon	1–1	Switzerland
Aubameyang 45'	Report	Mehmedi 5' (pen.)

St James' Park, Newcastle
Attendance: 15,748
Referee: Wilmar Roldán (Colombia)

29 July 2012
14:30

Mexico	2–0	Gabon
Dos Santos 63', 90+2' (pen.)	Report

Ricoh Arena, Coventry
Attendance: 28,171
Referee: Ben Williams (Australia)
29 July 2012
17:15

South Korea	2–1	Switzerland
Park Chu-young 57'; Kim Bo-kyung 64'	Report	Emeghara 60'

Ricoh Arena, Coventry
Attendance: 30,114
Referee: Raúl Orosco (Bolivia)

1 August 2012
17:00

Mexico	1–0	Switzerland
Peralta 69'	Report

Millennium Stadium, Cardiff
Attendance: 50,000
Referee: Ravshan Irmatov (Uzbekistan)
1 August 2012
17:00

South Korea	0–0	Gabon
	Report

Wembley Stadium, London
Attendance: 76,927
Referee: Pavel Královec (Czech Republic)

=== Group C ===
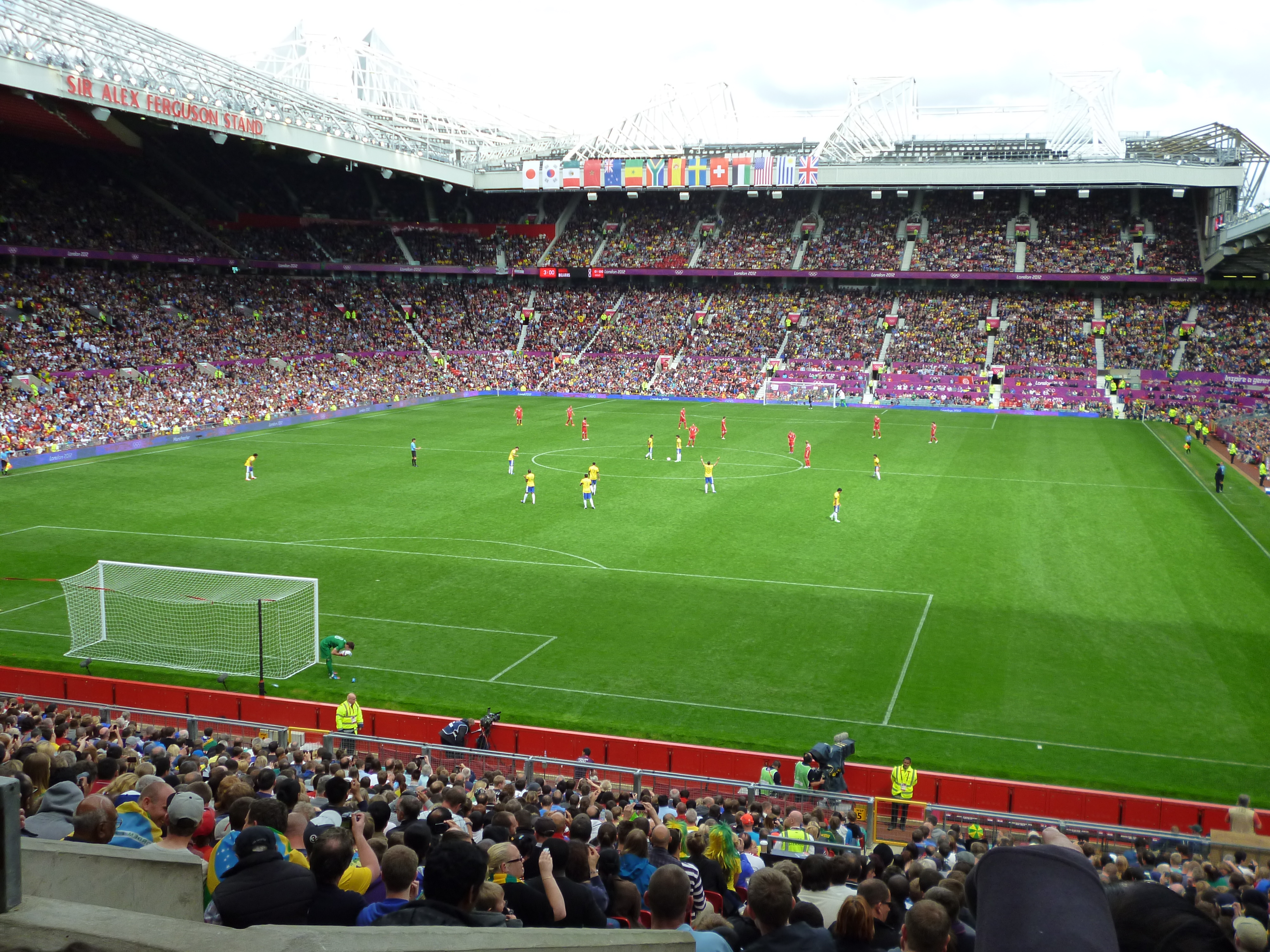
Match between Brazil and Belarus

Pos	Team	Pld	W	D	L	GF	GA	GD	Pts	Qualification
1	Brazil	3	3	0	0	9	3	+6	9	Advance to knockout stage
2	Egypt	3	1	1	1	6	5	+1	4	Advance to knockout stage
3	Belarus	3	1	0	2	3	6	−3	3	
4	New Zealand	3	0	1	2	1	5	−4	1	

Source: FIFA
26 July 2012
19:45

Belarus	1–0	New Zealand
Baha 45+1'	Report

City of Coventry Stadium, Coventry
Attendance: 14,457
Referee: Bakary Gassama (Gambia)
26 July 2012
19:45

Brazil	3–2	Egypt
Rafael 16'; Damião 26'; Neymar 30'	Report	Aboutrika 52'; Salah 76'

Millennium Stadium, Cardiff
Attendance: 26,812
Referee: Gianluca Rocchi (Italy)

29 July 2012
12:00

Egypt	1–1	New Zealand
Salah 40'	Report	Wood 17'

Old Trafford, Manchester
Attendance: 50,050
Referee: Mark Clattenburg (Great Britain)
29 July 2012
15:00

Brazil	3–1	Belarus
Pato 15'; Neymar 65'; Oscar 90+3'	Report	Bressan 8'

Old Trafford, Manchester
Attendance: 66,212
Referee: Yuichi Nishimura (Japan)

1 August 2012
14:30

Brazil	3–0	New Zealand
Danilo 23'; Damião 29'; Sandro 52'	Report

St James' Park, Newcastle
Attendance: 25,201
Referee: Bakary Gassama (Gambia)
1 August 2012
14:30

Egypt	3–1	Belarus
Salah 56'; Mohsen 73'; Aboutrika 79'	Report	Varankow 87'

Hampden Park, Glasgow
Attendance: 8,732
Referee: Roberto García (Mexico)

=== Group D ===
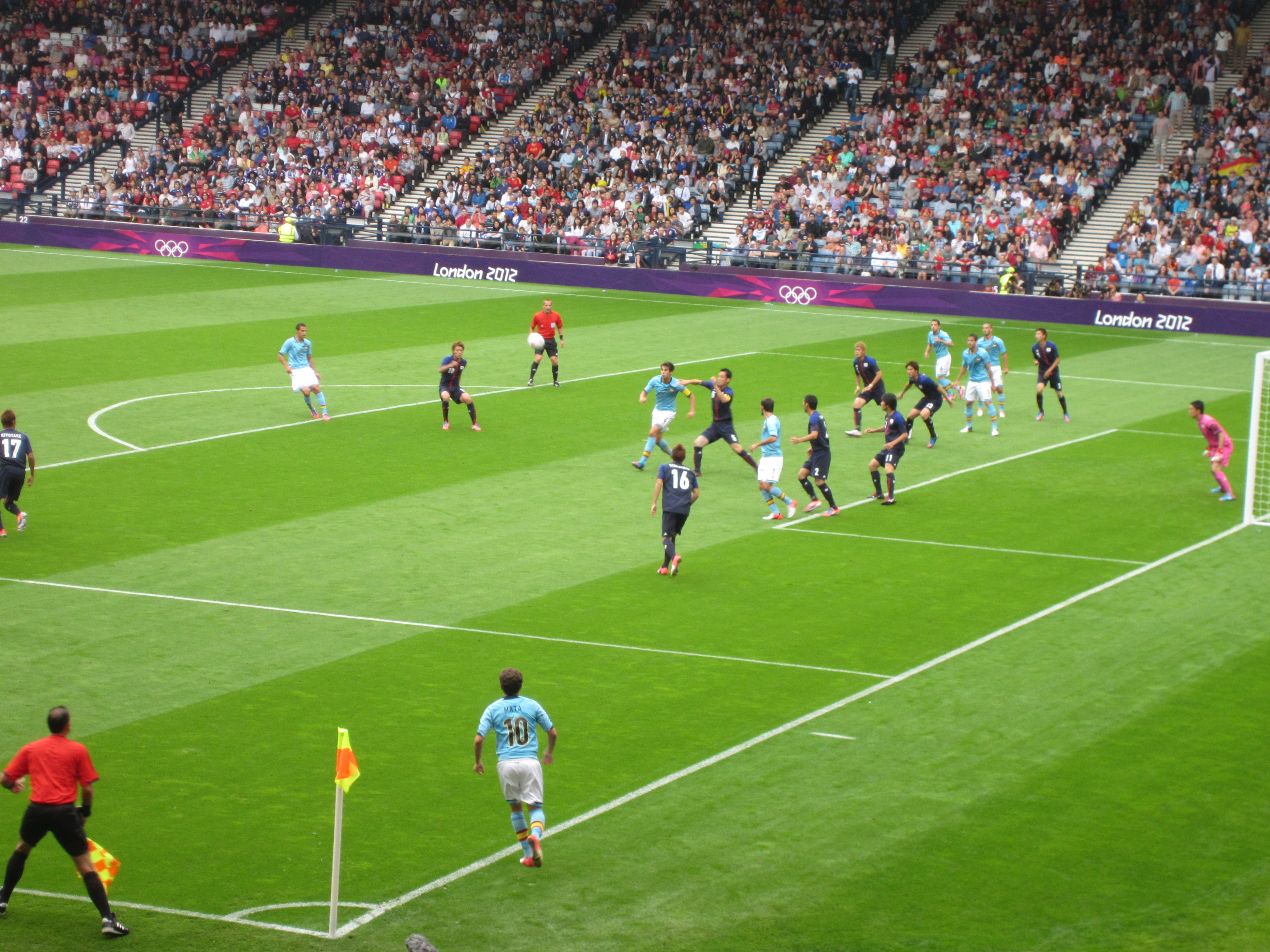
Juan Mata taking a corner in the match between Spain and Japan

Pos	Team	Pld	W	D	L	GF	GA	GD	Pts	Qualification
1	Japan	3	2	1	0	2	0	+2	7	Advance to knockout stage
2	Honduras	3	1	2	0	3	2	+1	5	Advance to knockout stage
3	Morocco	3	0	2	1	2	3	−1	2	
4	Spain	3	0	1	2	0	2	−2	1	

Source: FIFA
26 July 2012
12:00

Honduras	2–2	Morocco
Bengtson 56', 65' (pen.)	Report	Barrada 39'; Labyad 67'

Hampden Park, Glasgow
Attendance: 23,421
Referee: Pavel Královec (Czech Republic)
26 July 2012
14:45

Spain	0–1	Japan
	Report	Ōtsu 34'

Hampden Park, Glasgow
Attendance: 37,726
Referee: Mark Geiger (United States)

29 July 2012
17:00

Japan	1–0	Morocco
Nagai 84'	Report

St James' Park, Newcastle
Attendance: 24,936
Referee: Svein Oddvar Moen (Norway)
29 July 2012
19:45

Spain	0–1	Honduras
	Report	Bengtson 7'

St James' Park, Newcastle
Attendance: 26,523
Referee: Juan Soto (Venezuela)

1 August 2012
17:00

Spain	0–0	Morocco
	Report

Old Trafford, Manchester
Attendance: 35,973
Referee: Ben Williams (Australia)
1 August 2012
17:00

Japan	0–0	Honduras
	Report

City of Coventry Stadium, Coventry
Attendance: 25,862
Referee: Slim Jedidi (Tunisia)

== Knockout stage ==
In the knockout stage, if a match was level at the end of normal playing time, extra time was played (two periods of fifteen minutes each) and followed, if necessary, by a penalty shoot-out to determine the winner.

=== Bracket ===
Quarter-finals
4 August – Cardiff
Great Britain	1 (4)
South Korea (p)	1 (5)
4 August – Newcastle
Brazil	3
Honduras	2
4 August – London
Mexico (a.e.t.)	4
Senegal	2
4 August – Manchester
Japan	3
Egypt	0

Semi-finals
7 August – Manchester
South Korea	0
Brazil	3
7 August – London
Mexico	3
Japan	1

Gold medal match
11 August – London
Brazil	1
Mexico	2
Bronze medal match
10 August – Cardiff
South Korea	2
Japan	0

=== Quarter-finals ===
4 August 2012
12:00

Japan	3–0	Egypt
Nagai 14'; Yoshida 78'; Ōtsu 83'	Report

Old Trafford, Manchester
Attendance: 70,772
Referee: Mark Geiger (United States)

4 August 2012
14:30

Mexico	4–2 (a.e.t.)	Senegal
Enríquez 10'; Aquino 62'; Dos Santos 98'; Herrera 109'	Report	Konaté 69'; Baldé 76'

Wembley Stadium, London
Attendance: 81,855
Referee: Mark Clattenburg (Great Britain)

4 August 2012
17:00

Brazil	3–2	Honduras
Damião 38', 60'; Neymar 50' (pen.)	Report	Martínez 12'; Espinoza 48'

St James' Park, Newcastle
Attendance: 42,166
Referee: Felix Brych (Germany)

4 August 2012
19:30

Great Britain	1–1 (a.e.t.)	South Korea
Ramsey 36' (pen.)	Report	Ji Dong-won 29'
Penalties
Ramsey (penalty scored); Cleverley (penalty scored); Dawson (penalty scored); Giggs (penalty scored); Sturridge (penalty missed)	4–5	(penalty scored) Koo Ja-cheol; (penalty scored) Baek Sung-dong; (penalty scored) Hwang Seok-ho; (penalty scored) Park Jong-woo; (penalty scored) Ki Sung-yueng

Millennium Stadium, Cardiff
Attendance: 70,171
Referee: Wilmar Roldán (Colombia)

=== Semi-finals ===
7 August 2012
17:00

Mexico	3–1	Japan
Fabián 31'; Peralta 65'; Cortés 90+3'	Report	Ōtsu 12'

Wembley Stadium, London
Attendance: 82,372
Referee: Gianluca Rocchi (Italy)

7 August 2012
19:45

South Korea	0–3	Brazil
	Report	Rômulo 38'; Damião 57', 64'

Old Trafford, Manchester
Attendance: 69,389
Referee: Pavel Královec (Czech Republic)

=== Bronze medal match ===
10 August 2012
19:45

South Korea	2–0	Japan
Park Chu-young 38'; Koo Ja-cheol 57'	Report

Millennium Stadium, Cardiff
Attendance: 56,393
Referee: Ravshan Irmatov (Uzbekistan)

=== Gold medal match ===
11 August 2012
15:00

Brazil	1–2	Mexico
Hulk 90+1'	Report 1 Report 2	Peralta 1', 75'

Wembley Stadium, London
Attendance: 86,162
Referee: Mark Clattenburg (Great Britain)

== Statistics ==
=== Goalscorers ===
With six goals, Leandro Damião of Brazil was the top scorer in the tournament. In total, 76 goals were scored by 49 different players, none of them credited as own goals.

6 goals

- (Brazil) Leandro Damião

5 goals

- (Senegal) Moussa Konaté

4 goals

- (Mexico) Oribe Peralta

3 goals

- (Brazil) Neymar
- (Egypt) Mohamed Salah
- (Honduras) Jerry Bengtson
- (Japan) Yūki Ōtsu
- (Mexico) Giovani dos Santos

2 goals

- (Egypt) Mohamed Aboutrika
- (United Kingdom) Daniel Sturridge
- (Japan) Kensuke Nagai
- (South Korea) Park Chu-young
- (United Arab Emirates) Ismail Matar

1 goal

- (Belarus) Dzmitry Baha
- (Belarus) Renan Bressan
- (Belarus) Andrey Varankow
- (Brazil) Danilo
- (Brazil) Hulk
- (Brazil) Oscar
- (Brazil) Alexandre Pato
- (Brazil) Rafael
- (Brazil) Rômulo
- (Brazil) Sandro
- (Egypt) Marwan Mohsen
- (Gabon) Pierre-Emerick Aubameyang
- (United Kingdom) Craig Bellamy
- (United Kingdom) Ryan Giggs
- (United Kingdom) Aaron Ramsey
- (United Kingdom) Scott Sinclair
- (Honduras) Roger Espinoza
- (Honduras) Mario Martínez
- (Japan) Maya Yoshida
- (South Korea) Koo Ja-cheol
- (South Korea) Kim Bo-kyung
- (South Korea) Ji Dong-won
- (Mexico) Javier Aquino
- (Mexico) Javier Cortés
- (Mexico) Jorge Enríquez
- (Mexico) Marco Fabián
- (Mexico) Héctor Herrera
- (Morocco) Abdelaziz Barrada
- (Morocco) Zakaria Labyad
- (New Zealand) Chris Wood
- (Senegal) Ibrahima Baldé
- (Switzerland) Innocent Emeghara
- (Switzerland) Admir Mehmedi
- (United Arab Emirates) Rashed Eisa
- (Uruguay) Nicolás Lodeiro
- (Uruguay) Gastón Ramírez

=== Discipline ===
Red cards

- (Brazil) Alex Sandro
- (Gabon) Henri Ndong
- (Egypt) Saad Samir
- (Honduras) Wilmer Crisanto
- (Honduras) Roger Espinoza
- (Morocco) Zakarya Bergdich
- (Senegal) Abdoulaye Ba
- (Spain) Iñigo Martínez
- (Switzerland) Oliver Buff

=== Final ranking ===
As per statistical convention in football, matches decided in extra time are counted as wins and losses, while matches decided by penalty shoot-outs are counted as draws.

Pos	Team	Pld	W	D	L	GF	GA	GD	Pts	Final result
1st place, gold medalist(s)	Mexico	6	5	1	0	12	4	+8	16	Gold medal
2nd place, silver medalist(s)	Brazil	6	5	0	1	16	7	+9	15	Silver medal
3rd place, bronze medalist(s)	South Korea	6	2	3	1	5	5	0	9	Bronze medal
4	Japan	6	3	1	2	6	5	+1	10	Fourth place
5	Great Britain	4	2	2	0	6	3	+3	8	Eliminated in quarter-finals
6	Senegal	4	1	2	1	6	6	0	5	Eliminated in quarter-finals
7	Honduras	4	1	2	1	5	5	0	5	Eliminated in quarter-finals
8	Egypt	4	1	1	2	6	8	−2	4	Eliminated in quarter-finals
9	Uruguay	3	1	0	2	2	4	−2	3	Eliminated in group stage
10	Belarus	3	1	0	2	3	6	−3	3	Eliminated in group stage
11	Morocco	3	0	2	1	2	3	−1	2	Eliminated in group stage
12	Gabon	3	0	2	1	1	3	−2	2	Eliminated in group stage
13	Switzerland	3	0	1	2	2	4	−2	1	Eliminated in group stage
14	Spain	3	0	1	2	0	2	−2	1	Eliminated in group stage
15	United Arab Emirates	3	0	1	2	3	6	−3	1	Eliminated in group stage
16	New Zealand	3	0	1	2	1	5	−4	1	Eliminated in group stage

Source: Olympics

== Controversies ==
=== Queues ===
For the first matchday at St James' Park, there were long queues at the box office, leading to fans missing some of the game. A spokesman for Ticketmaster said: "We saw extremely high numbers of spectators arriving at St James' Park to purchase football tickets on the day of the event. While Ticketmaster is contracted to manage the box offices at Olympic venues, the staff numbers at those venues are determined by LOCOG. We will continue to work closely with LOCOG to ensure that the box office staff levels are sufficient to meet the demands for ticket sales and collection". LOCOG described the situation as "totally and completely 100% unacceptable", and after changes were made in the process, the issue was reportedly avoided for the second round of matches.

During the matches held at the Wembley Stadium on 29 July, fans were subjected to long queues at the concession stands in the ground after Visa's card payment system crashed, leaving cash payment as the only alternative. The situation was compounded by the fact that, as Visa had been granted exclusive rights to the Olympics, other cards could not be accepted as payment, and the number of cash machines in the stadium had been reduced after 27 that worked on the LINK system had been removed to be replaced by eight that could only be used by Visa cards.

There were several problems relating to transport for events held at the Millennium Stadium in Cardiff. There was severe congestion at Cardiff Central railway station when Great Britain played South Korea; and the bronze medal match also had rail disruption when a retaining wall collapsed onto the tracks.

=== Player sent home ===
Swiss footballer Michel Morganella was sent home by the Switzerland team following their 2–1 loss against South Korea after he sent a tweet that, according to the director of Swiss Olympic Committee Gian Gilli, "discriminated, insulted and violated the dignity of the South Korean football team and people".

=== Great Britain football teams ===
Following the criticism against Scottish female player Kim Little, for choosing not to sing the British national anthem "God Save the Queen" because of her national identity, other Scottish and Welsh players, Ryan Giggs, Craig Bellamy and Ifeoma Dieke, also attracted comment in the media for remaining silent. Giggs, the Great Britain men's captain, later said: "The problem is the British anthem is the same as the English anthem and if you're a Welshman or a Scotsman it's difficult".

LOCOG also apologised after an error in the official match programme for the first game mistakenly described Welsh player Joe Allen as being English.

=== Park Jong-woo incident ===
After South Korea defeated Japan in the bronze medal match at the Millennium Stadium in Cardiff on 10 August, South Korean player Park Jong-woo walked around the field holding a banner with a political message written in Korean, "독도는 우리 땅!" (dokdo neun uri ttang, lit.: "Dokdo is our territory"). This incident occurred on the same night after South Korean President Lee Myung-bak had visited the islands which both South Korea and Japan claim as their territory. The IOC and FIFA reviewed the evidence, since FIFA statutes prohibit political statements being made by athletes at Olympic events. The IOC barred Park from the bronze medal ceremony and did not permit him to receive his medal. In addition, it asked FIFA to discipline Park, and stated that it may decide on further sanctions at a later date. IOC president Jacques Rogge told reporters: "We will take a possible decision of what will happen with the medal later". FIFA failed to reach a conclusion on the case at a meeting at its Zürich headquarters held on 5 October, and the disciplinary committee discussed the case again on the following week, then again failed to reach a verdict. After that, the Korean Olympic Committee (KOC) announced that Park would receive his bronze medal. The case was heard again by the committee on 20 November, and FIFA finally decided and announced on 3 December to suspend Park for two matches after he was considered to have breached the FIFA Disciplinary Code and the Regulations of the Olympic Football Tournaments. FIFA also imposed a warning on the Korea Football Association and reminded it of its obligation to properly instruct its players on all the pertinent rules and applicable regulations before the start of any competition, in order to avoid such incidents in the future. The Korea Football Association was warned that should incidents of such nature occur again in the future, the FIFA Disciplinary Committee may impose harsher sanctions on the Korea Football Association.

== See also ==
- Football at the 2012 Summer Olympics – Women's tournament
