= Dmitry Baga =

Belarusian professional footballer

Dmitry Baga Дзмітрый Бага
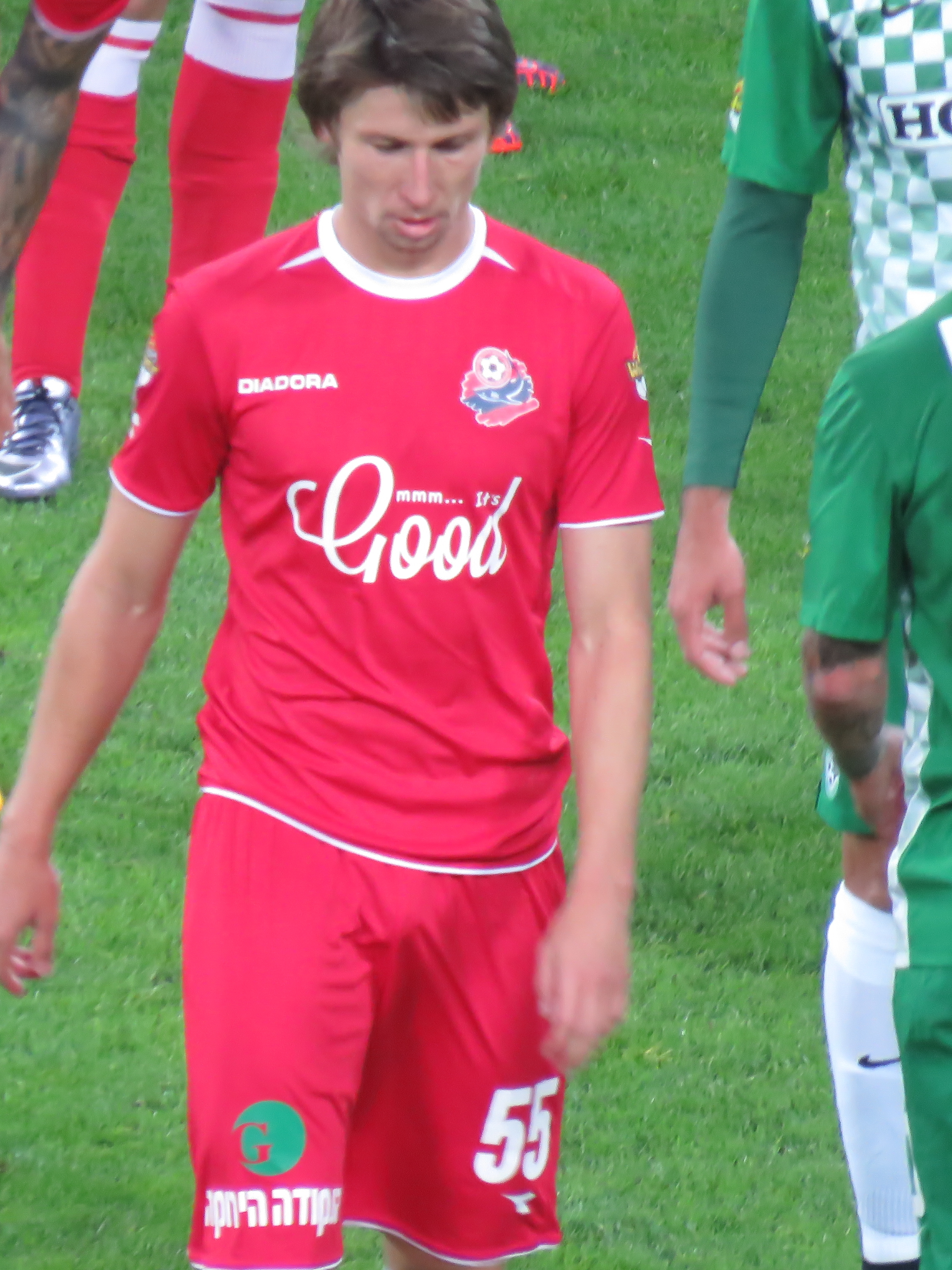

Personal information
- Full name: Dmitry Anatolyevich Baga
- Date of birth: 4 January 1990 (age 36)
- Place of birth: Borisov, Minsk Oblast, Byelorussian SSR, Soviet Union
- Height: 1.82 m (5 ft 11 1/2 in)
- Position: Midfielder

Team information
- Current team: DMedia

Youth career
- 2007–2008: BATE Borisov

Senior career*
Years	Team	Apps	(Gls)
2008–2015	BATE Borisov	120	(18)
2016	Hapoel Haifa	14	(0)
2016–2017	Atromitos	26	(0)
2017–2020	BATE Borisov	81	(6)
2021	Liepāja	21	(0)
2022	Gomel	16	(1)
2023	Dinamo Brest	21	(2)
2024–	DMedia (Medialeague)		

International career^{‡}
2008–2009	Belarus U19	5	(0)
2009–2012	Belarus U21	25	(1)
2011–2012	Belarus Olympic	8	(1)
2013–2019	Belarus	3	(0)
- * Club domestic league appearances and goals as of 15:45, 2 December 2023 (UTC) ‡ National team caps and goals as of 9 September 2019

Dmitry Anatolyevich Baga (Belarusian: Дзмітрый Анатольевіч Бага; Russian: Дмитрий Анатольевич Бага; born 4 January 1990) is a Belarusian professional footballer.

== International career ==
Baga was a member of the Belarus U21 that finished in 3rd place at the 2011 UEFA European Under-21 Football Championship. He played in all five of the matches and scored in a group stage loss against Denmark. He also represented the Belarus Olympic team that participated in the 2012 Toulon Tournament. He competed at the 2012 Olympics for Belarus. Baga earned his first cap for the senior national side of his country on 15 October 2013, in a friendly match against Japan.

He is a younger brother of Aleksey Baga, professional football coach and former player.

== Honours ==
BATE Borisov

- Belarusian Premier League champion: 2008, 2009, 2010, 2011, 2012, 2013, 2014, 2015, 2017, 2018
- Belarusian Cup winner: 2009–10, 2014–15, 2019–20, 2020–21
- Belarusian Super Cup winner: 2010, 2011, 2013, 2014, 2015

Gomel

- Belarusian Cup winner: 2021–22
