= 2011 UEFA European Under-21 Championship =

UEFA U21-EM 2011 (in Danish)

Tournament details
- Host country: Denmark
- Dates: 11–25 June
- Teams: 8 (finals); 52 (qualifying) (from 1 confederation)
- Venue: 4 (in 4 host cities)

Final positions
- Champions: Spain (3rd title)
- Runners-up: Switzerland
- Third place: Belarus
- Fourth place: Czech Republic

Tournament statistics
- Matches played: 16
- Goals scored: 36 (2.25 per match)
- Attendance: 101,955 (6,372 per match)
- Top scorer: (Spain) Adrián (5 goals)
- Best player: (Spain) Juan Mata

The 2011 UEFA European Under-21 Championship was the 18th staging of UEFA's European Under-21 Championship. The final tournament was hosted by Denmark between 11 and 25 June 2011.

The Danish bid was chosen by UEFA's Executive Committee on 10 December 2008 in Nyon, Switzerland. This bid defeated the other bid from Israel.

Qualification for the final tournament took place between March 2009 and October 2010.

This competition also acted as a qualifier for the 2012 Summer Olympics, as 3 teams qualified.

Spain won their third title after defeating Switzerland 2–0 in the final.

== Host selection ==
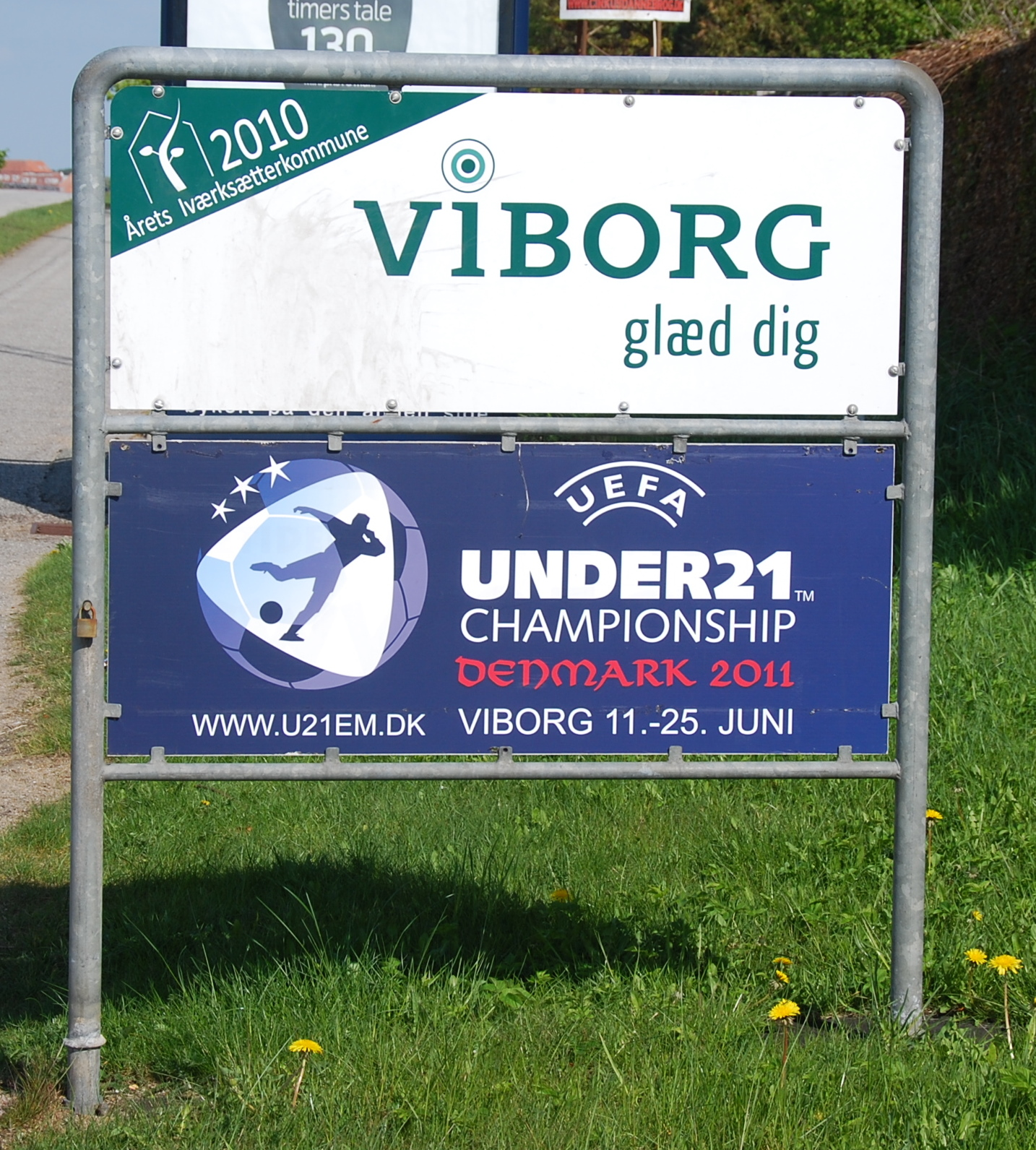
Sign in Viborg

The organisation of the event was initially contested by only two bids: Denmark and Israel. The bids were submitted on 15 June 2008.

The bids were inspected between June and September 2008, and a report was given to the National Team Competition Committee in October. The committee discussed the bids on 27 November 2008 and issued a recommendation to the UEFA Executive Committee, who decided on 10 December 2008 that Denmark would host the finals.

== Qualification ==
The draw for the 2011 UEFA European Under-21 Championship qualifying round took place in Århus on 4 February 2009. The qualifying draw determined the makeup of ten groups. Ten groups were formed in the qualifying draw including two sections of six sides and eight of five, as teams chase 7 finals places alongside host Denmark. The seeding pots are formed on the basis of former performance in the tournament. All groups contained one nation from the first five pots and two sections also included a team from Pot 6. The six European federations that have qualified for the 2009 FIFA U-20 World Cup (Germany, Italy, Czech Republic, Hungary, Spain and England) were each drawn in one of the six groups of five teams.

=== 2012 Summer Olympics and Great Britain team ===
The tournament was used as the European qualifying tournament for the 2012 Summer Olympics in London with the top teams qualifying for London 2012. The four British federations entered the qualification process as single entities, but are not eligible to qualify for the Olympics. If one or more British teams had qualified for the Championship, and to pass the first round, play-off games would be played (like in 2007 when Italy and Portugal faced for the last place in the Olympics). As Great Britain is the host nation for the 2012 Olympics, it is entitled to an automatic place in the competition. This caused controversy as in the Olympics, Great Britain competes as a single unified country, as opposed to the four individual nations in football. Scotland, Wales and Northern Ireland all logged public objections to the idea of a GB team at the Olympics, fearing that it would jeopardise their independent status in UEFA and FIFA. A compromise was reached in 2009 whereby England would field a team for the tournament, while the other three would not participate, but not object to England's involvement.

=== List of qualified teams ===
The following 8 teams qualified for the 2011 UEFA European Under-21 Championship

- Belarus
- Czech Republic
- Denmark (Host Nation)
- England
- Iceland
- Spain
- Switzerland
- Ukraine

== Venues ==
The tournament venues were all located in Jutland, at already existing stadiums in Aarhus, Aalborg, Herning and Viborg.

On 20 September 2010 it was announced that Aarhus Stadion would host the final. Further Aalborg Stadion was confirmed as the venue for the opening match and the eventual Olympic qualifying play-off. The semifinals were played at Herning Stadium and Viborg Stadion. It was also published that Denmark would play all of its matches in Aalborg and Aarhus.

Aarhus	Aalborg	Herning	Viborg
Aarhus Stadion	Aalborg Stadion	Herning Stadium	Viborg Stadion
56°7′55″N 10°11′47″E	57°3′5.4″N 9°53′56.76″E	56°7′1″N 8°57′6″E	56°27′21.23″N 9°24′7.43″E
Capacity: 20,000	Capacity: 10,500	Capacity: 9,600	Capacity: 9,566
2011 UEFA European Under-21 Championship is located in Denmark

== Format ==
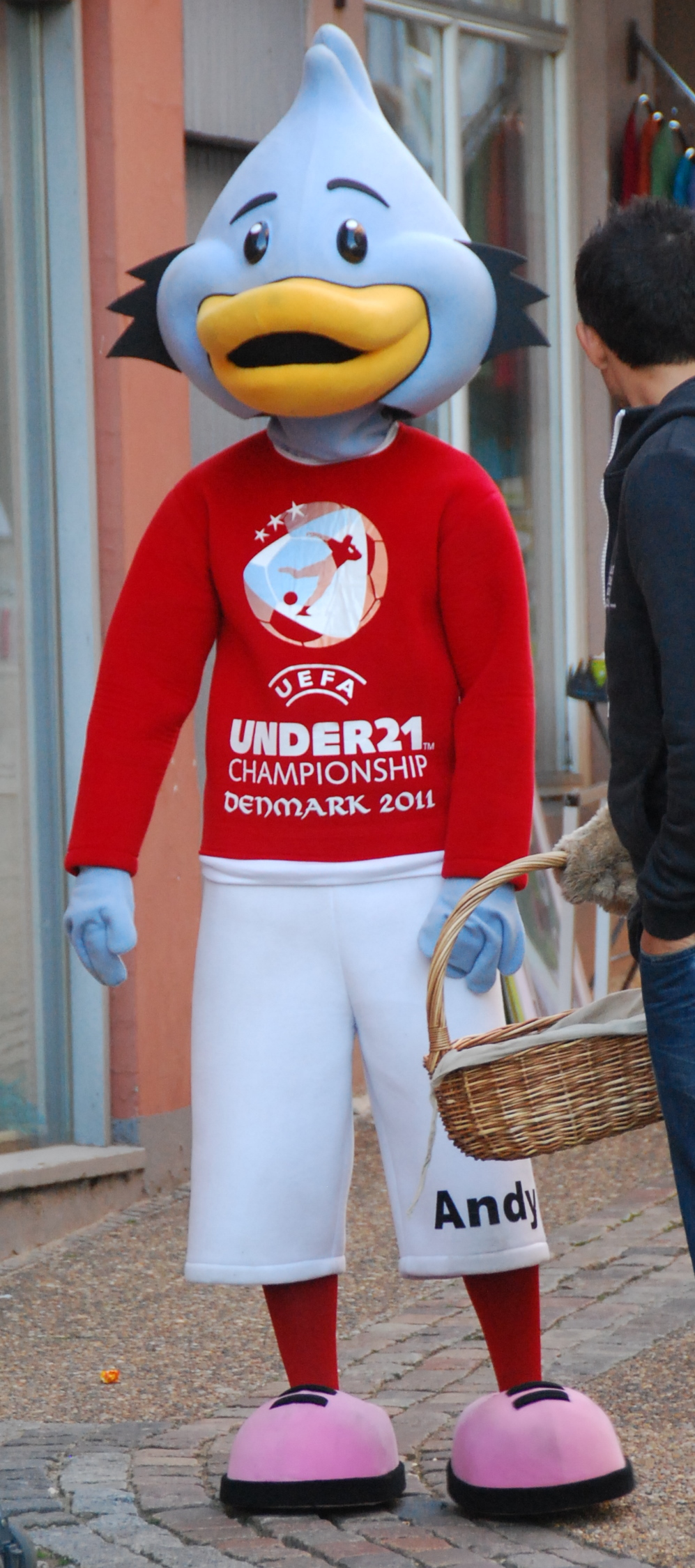
Andy, the mascot

The final tournament consisted of two groups of four, with the top two from each progressing to the semifinals where it becomes a knockout competition. In the finals held a year before a summer Olympic Games the championship also serves as qualification for the Olympic Football Tournament.

Players were eligible for the 2011 UEFA European Under-21 Championship if they were born on or later than 1 January 1988.

== Seeding ==
The draw for the final tournament took place on 9 November 2010 at Aalborg Congress & Culture Centre in Aalborg.

Similar to former tournaments, the games in each group are to be held at just two stadia. For the draw, the finalists were divided into three seeding pots, based on average points per game in the qualifying phase, with each group having one team from pot 1 and 2, and two teams from pot 3. Denmark, as hosts, were seeded first automatically.

Pot 1	Pot 2	Pot 3
Denmark (assigned to A1); Czech Republic (assigned to B1)	Spain; Iceland	England; Switzerland; Belarus; Ukraine

== Squads ==
Squads for the 2011 Euro U-21 Championship consisted of 23 players, as in the previous tournament in 2009. Only players born on or after 1 January 1988 were eligible to play.

== Referees ==
In April 2011 UEFA published a list of referees, assistant referees and fourth officials to officiate at the tournament. All of the referees are either Premier Category 1-referees or Category 2-referees, respectively the second highest and third highest tier of international referees. All referees are appointed because they are deemed to be future elite referees, thus they are all between 31 and 38 years old and therefore adhere to the U21 philosophy of being the tournament of the stars of tomorrow.

Referees

- Robert Schörgenhofer (Austria)
- Paolo Tagliavento (Italy)
- Marijo Strahonja (Croatia)
- Aleksandar Stavrev (Macedonia)
- Milorad Mažić (Serbia)
- Markus Strömbergsson (Sweden)

Fourth officials

- Kenn Hansen (Denmark)
- Liran Liany (Israel)

== Tiebreakers ==
As in Under-21 Euro 2009: If two or more teams are equal on points on completion of the group matches, the following criteria are applied to determine the rankings.

1. Higher number of points obtained in the group matches played among the teams in question
2. Superior goal difference from the group matches played among the teams in question
3. Higher number of goals scored in the group matches played among the teams in question
4. If, after applying criteria 1 to 4 to several teams, two or more teams still have an equal ranking, the criteria 1 to 4 will be reapplied to determine the ranking of these teams. If this procedure does not lead to a decision, criteria 5 and 6 will apply
5. Results of all group matches:
  1. Superior goal difference
  2. Higher number of goals scored
  3. Fair play conduct
6. Drawing of lots

== Group stage ==
The draw took place on 9 November 2010 in Aalborg, Denmark. The first round saw the eight teams divided into two groups of four teams. Each group was a round-robin, where each teams plays one game against every other team in their group. Teams were awarded three points for a win, one point for a draw and no points for a defeat. The teams finishing first and second in each group qualified for the semifinals.

=== Group A ===
In group A tie-breakers were needed to break down the three-point tie with Belarus, Denmark and Iceland. Belarus advanced due to a better goal difference in the matches between those three.

Team	Pld	W	D	L	GF	GA	GD	Pts
Switzerland	3	3	0	0	6	0	+6	9
Belarus	3	1	0	2	3	5	−2	3
Iceland	3	1	0	2	3	5	−2	3
Denmark	3	1	0	2	3	5	−2	3

3 Way Tie-Breaker

Team	Pld	W	D	L	GF	GA	GD	Pts
Belarus	2	1	0	1	3	2	+1	3
Iceland	2	1	0	1	3	3	0	3
Denmark	2	1	0	1	3	4	−1	3

All times are UTC+2.

11 June 2011
18:00

Belarus	2–0	Iceland
Varankow 77' (pen.); Skavysh 87'	Report

Aarhus Stadion, Aarhus
Attendance: 2,815
Referee: Aleksandar Stavrev (Macedonia)
11 June 2011
20:45

Denmark	0–1	Switzerland
	Report	Shaqiri 48'

Aalborg Stadion, Aalborg
Attendance: 9,678
Referee: Robert Schörgenhofer (Austria)

14 June 2011
18:00

Switzerland	2–0	Iceland
Frei 1'; Emeghara 40'	Report

Aalborg Stadion, Aalborg
Attendance: 1,903
Referee: Marijo Strahonja (Croatia)
14 June 2011
20:45

Denmark	2–1	Belarus
Eriksen 22'; Jørgensen 71'	Report	Baha 20'

Aarhus Stadion, Aarhus
Attendance: 18,152
Referee: Paolo Tagliavento (Italy)

18 June 2011
20:45

Iceland	3–1	Denmark
Sigþórsson 58'; Bjarnason 60'; Valgarðsson 90+2'	Report	Kadrii 81'

Aalborg Stadion, Aalborg
Attendance: 9,308
Referee: Milorad Mažić (Serbia)
18 June 2011
20:45

Switzerland	3–0	Belarus
Mehmedi 6' (pen.), 43'; Feltscher 90+3'	Report

Aarhus Stadion, Aarhus
Attendance: 1,604
Referee: Markus Strömbergsson (Sweden)

=== Group B ===
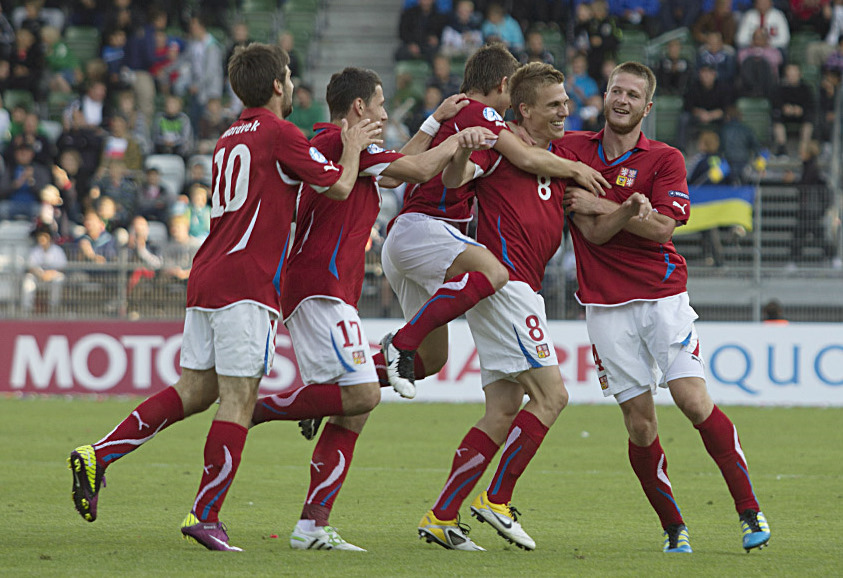
Czech players after Bořek Dočkal's 2–0 goal against Ukraine

Team	Pld	W	D	L	GF	GA	GD	Pts
Spain	3	2	1	0	6	1	+5	7
Czech Republic	3	2	0	1	4	4	0	6
England	3	0	2	1	2	3	−1	2
Ukraine	3	0	1	2	1	5	−4	1

All times are UTC+2.

12 June 2011
18:00

Czech Republic	2–1	Ukraine
Dočkal 49', 56'	Report	Bilyi 87'

Viborg Stadion, Viborg
Attendance: 4,251
Referee: Milorad Mažić (Serbia)
12 June 2011
20:45

Spain	1–1	England
Herrera 14'	Report	Welbeck 88'

Herning Stadium, Herning
Attendance: 8,046
Referee: Markus Strömbergsson (Sweden)

15 June 2011
18:00

Czech Republic	0–2	Spain
	Report	Adrián 27', 47'

Viborg Stadion, Viborg
Attendance: 4,662
Referee: Robert Schörgenhofer (Austria)
15 June 2011
20:45

Ukraine	0–0	England
	Report

Herning Stadium, Herning
Attendance: 3,495
Referee: Aleksandar Stavrev (Macedonia)

19 June 2011
20:45

England	1–2	Czech Republic
Welbeck 76'	Report	Chramosta 89'; Pekhart 90+4'

Viborg Stadion, Viborg
Attendance: 5,262
Referee: Paolo Tagliavento (Italy)
19 June 2011
20:45

Ukraine	0–3	Spain
	Report	Mata 10', 72' (pen.); Adrián 27'

Herning Stadium, Herning
Attendance: 3,302
Referee: Marijo Strahonja (Croatia)

== Knockout stage ==
=== Knockout map ===
Semi-finals
22 June – Herning
Switzerland (a.e.t.)	1
Czech Republic	0
22 June – Viborg
Spain (a.e.t.)	3
Belarus	1

Final
25 June – Aarhus
Switzerland	0
Spain	2
Olympic play-off
25 June – Aalborg
Czech Republic	0
Belarus	1

=== Semifinals ===
Winners qualify for 2012 Summer Olympics.

22 June 2011
18:00

Spain	3–1 (a.e.t.)	Belarus
Adrián 89', 105'; Jeffrén 113'	Report	Varankow 38'

Viborg Stadion, Viborg
Attendance: 7,521
Referee: Markus Strömbergsson (Sweden)

22 June 2011
21:00

Switzerland	1–0 (a.e.t.)	Czech Republic
Mehmedi 114'	Report

Herning Stadium, Herning
Attendance: 5,038
Referee: Robert Schörgenhofer (Austria)

=== Olympic play-off ===
Winner qualifies for 2012 Summer Olympics.

25 June 2011
15:00

Czech Republic	0–1	Belarus
	Report	Filipenko 88'

Aalborg Stadion, Aalborg
Attendance: 870
Referee: Milorad Mažić (Serbia)

=== Final ===
25 June 2011
20:45

Switzerland	0–2	Spain
	Report	Herrera 41'; Thiago 81'

Aarhus Stadion, Aarhus
Attendance: 16,110
Referee: Paolo Tagliavento (Italy)

== Goalscorers ==
5 goals

- (Spain) Adrián

3 goals

- (Switzerland) Admir Mehmedi

2 goals

- (Belarus) Andrey Varankow
- (Czech Republic) Bořek Dočkal
- (Spain) Ander Herrera
- (Spain) Juan Mata
- (England) Danny Welbeck

1 goal

- (Belarus) Dzmitry Baha
- (Belarus) Egor Filipenko
- (Belarus) Maksim Skavysh
- (Czech Republic) Jan Chramosta
- (Czech Republic) Tomáš Pekhart
- (Denmark) Christian Eriksen
- (Denmark) Nicolai Jørgensen
- (Denmark) Bashkim Kadrii
- (Iceland) Birkir Bjarnason
- (Iceland) Kolbeinn Sigþórsson
- (Iceland) Hjörtur Logi Valgarðsson
- (Spain) Thiago
- (Spain) Jeffrén
- (Switzerland) Innocent Emeghara
- (Switzerland) Frank Feltscher
- (Switzerland) Fabian Frei
- (Switzerland) Xherdan Shaqiri
- (Ukraine) Maksym Bilyi

=== Team of the Tournament ===
The UEFA Technical Team was charged with naming a squad composed of the 23 best players over the course of the tournament. The group of nine analysts watched every game at the tournament before making their decision after the final. Spain, with seven, had most players in the team.

Goalkeeper	Defenders	Midfielders	Forwards
(Spain) David de Gea (Switzerland) Yann Sommer (Czech Republic) Tomáš Vaclík	(England) Chris Smalling (England) Kyle Walker (Spain) Dídac Vilà (Switzerland) Timm Klose (Switzerland) Jonathan Rossini (Ukraine) Yaroslav Rakitskiy (Denmark) Nicolai Boilesen (Czech Republic) Ondřej Čelůstka	(Denmark) Christian Eriksen (Czech Republic) Marcel Gecov (Spain) Ander Herrera (Spain) Javi Martínez (Spain) Thiago (Belarus) Mikhail Sivakov	(Switzerland) Admir Mehmedi (Switzerland) Xherdan Shaqiri (Spain) Adrián (Spain) Juan Mata (Iceland) Kolbeinn Sigþórsson (England) Daniel Sturridge

== Medal table and Olympic qualifiers ==
- Spain, Switzerland and Belarus qualify for the Olympic games finals.

See Football at the 2012 Summer Olympics

Pos	Team	Pld	W	D	L	GF	GA	GD	Pts	Final result
1st place, gold medalist(s)	Spain	5	4	1	0	11	2	+9	13	Gold Medal
2nd place, silver medalist(s)	Switzerland	5	4	0	1	7	2	+5	12	Silver Medal
3rd place, bronze medalist(s)	Belarus	5	2	0	3	5	8	−3	6	Bronze Medal
4	Czech Republic	5	2	0	3	4	6	−2	6	Fourth place
5	Iceland	3	1	0	2	3	5	−2	3	Eliminated in group stage
6	Denmark (H)	3	1	0	2	3	5	−2	3	Eliminated in group stage
7	England	3	0	2	1	2	3	−1	2	Eliminated in group stage
8	Ukraine	3	0	1	2	1	5	−4	1	Eliminated in group stage

Source: [ ]
(H) Hosts

== Media ==
=== Broadcasting ===
Country/area	Broadcaster(s)	Source
Belarus	Belteleradio	
Belgium	Telenet	
Brazil	Globosat	
Brunei	Astro SuperSport	
Bulgaria	Nova Sport (Bulgaria)	
Canada	TSN (8 matches); TSN2 (9 matches)	
Chile	Telecanal (some matches)	
Czech Republic	Česká televize	
Denmark	TV 2 (5 matches); TV 2 Sport (8 matches); TV 2 Zulu (2 matches)	
France	Direct8	
Germany	Eurosport	
Guatemala	Trecevision; Canal 11	
Iceland	RÚV	
Indonesia	RCTI; Indovision	
Israel	Sport 1 Sport 1 HD	
Ireland	Sky Sports	
Italy	RAI	
Japan	TV Asahi	
Latin America (except Brazil)	Televideo Services	
Malaysia	Astro SuperSport	
Mexico	OTI	
Middle East and North Africa List of countries: Algeria; Bahrain; Comoros; Djibouti; Egypt; Iraq; Jordan; Kuwait; Lebanon; Oman; Palestinian Authority; Libya; Mauritania; Morocco; Qatar; K.S.A.; Somalia; Sudan; Syria; Tunisia; U.A.E.; Yemen	Al Jazeera Sports +4, +10 Al Jazeera Sports HD1	
Norway	Viasat Fotball	
Portugal	Sport TV	
South Africa	Supersport International	
Spain	Cuatro (Spain's matches); La Siete	
Sweden	Viasat	
Switzerland	SRG SSR	
Thailand	MCOT/ GMM SPORT	
Ukraine	ICTV; Football TV Channel	
United Kingdom	Sky Sports 1/Sky Sports HD1	
Venezuela	Meridiano	
