= 2008–09 Belarusian Cup =

Tournament details
- Country: Belarus
- Teams: 51

Final positions
- Champions: Naftan Novopolotsk (1st title)
- Runners-up: Shakhtyor Soligorsk

Tournament statistics
- Matches played: 63
- Goals scored: 223 (3.54 per match)
- Top goal scorer(s): Syarhey Nikifarenka (7 goals)

The 2008–09 Belarusian Cup was the 18th season of the Belarusian annual cup competition.

Contrary to the league season, the competition has been conducted in a fall-spring rhythm. The first games were played on 30 July 2008. Naftan Novopolotsk won the Cup and qualified for the UEFA Europa League second qualifying round.

== Preliminary round ==
A preliminary round was held in order to reduce the number of teams in the First Round to 32. The matches were played on 30 July 2008.

30 July 2008	MZAL Minsk (A)	0–10	DSK Gomel (III)	Minsk
18:00 UTC+3			Khomchenko 17'; Misochenko 21'; Melhikaw 26' (pen.); Lyschenko 52', 60', 73', 89'; Dashuk 67', 81'; Luzhankov 68'	Stadium: BGATU Stadium

30 July 2008	Niva Chausy (A)	4–1	Livadiya Dzerzhinsk (III)	Chausy
18:00 UTC+3	Shundalov 22', 55'; Movchan 58'; Glushkov 86'		Skvarchevskiy 44'	Stadium: City Stadium

30 July 2008	Vertikal Kalinkovichi (III)	w/o	Myasokombinat Vitebsk (III)	Kalinkovichi
18:00 UTC+3

== First round ==
All fourteen teams of the First League and most of the Second League teams, plus three more amateur teams, started in this round. They were joined by the three winners of the Preliminary Round. The games were played on July 30, except for two games with Preliminary Round winners, which were held on August 3 and August 6.

30 July 2008	Zvezda-BGU Minsk (III)	1–0	Slutsksakhar Slutsk (III)	Minsk
15:00 UTC+3	Gritz 86'			Stadium: RCOP-BGU Stadium

30 July 2008	BGATU-Niva Samokhvalovichi (III)	0–2	PMC Postavy (II)	Minsk
16:00 UTC+3			Plechistik 45'; Tatarnikov 65'	Stadium: BGATU Stadium

30 July 2008	Zhlobin (III)	2–5	Vedrich-97 Rechitsa (II)	Zhlobin
17:00 UTC+3	Kazakov 20'; Gaev 61'		Gorokhovsky 24'; Khodyko 29'; Denisyuk 48'; Antsypov 80'; Bondarenko 85'	Stadium: City Stadium

30 July 2008	Start Miory (A)	1–6 (a.e.t.)	Khimik Svetlogorsk (II)	Miory
17:00 UTC+3	Vasilevskiy 41' (pen.)		Sidorenko 84', 93', 110' (pen.); Gavrilovich 104'; Paznyak 111', 119'	Stadium: City Stadium

30 July 2008	PMK-7 Gantsevichi (A)	0–3	Slavia Mozyr (II)	Gantsevichi
17:30 UTC+3			Korotkevich 67'; Sigay 79'; Shevtsov 85'	Stadium: City Stadium

30 July 2008	Gorodeya (III)	1–2 (a.e.t.)	Dinamo-Belcard Grodno (II)	Gorodeya
17:30 UTC+3	Osipovich 55' (pen.)		Dudin 74' (pen.); Balyuk 112'	Stadium: Gorodeya Stadium

30 July 2008	Orsha (III)	0–3	Veras Nesvizh (II)	Orsha
17:30 UTC+3			Ravina 73'; Shalimo 47'; Tikhonchik 73'	Stadium: Lokomotiv Stadium

30 July 2008	Molodechno (III)	1–3	Volna Pinsk (II)	Molodechno
17:30 UTC+3	Luzhinsky 37'		Volodko 34', 51'; Naperkovsky 55'	Stadium: City Stadium

30 July 2008	Neftyanik Rechitsa (A)	0–1	Lida (II)	Rechitsa
18:00 UTC+3			Shostak 73'	Stadium: Central Stadium

30 July 2008	Neman Mosty (III)	2–0	Baranovichi (II)	Mosty
18:00 UTC+3	Baleyko 66', 71'			Stadium: Neman Stadium

30 July 2008	Osipovichi (III)	5–3	Polotsk (II)	Osipovichi
18:00 UTC+3	Ivchenko 25', 40', 65'; Melnik 76', 84'		Savinaw 7', 29', 61'	Stadium: Yunost Stadium

30 July 2008	Tsementnik Krasnoselsky (A)	1–7	Kommunalnik Slonim (II)	Krasnoselsky
18:00 UTC+3	Monchinskiy 32' (pen.)		Kolyadko 7'; Avramchikov 9', 56', 70', 86'; Kiriyevich 69', 76'	Stadium: Tsementnik Stadium

30 July 2008	Klechesk Kletsk (III)	0–0 (a.e.t.) (4–2 p)	Spartak Shklov (II)	Kletsk
18:00 UTC+3				Stadium: City Stadium

30 July 2008	Bereza (III)	0–4	Minsk (II)	Bereza
18:00 UTC+3			Khachaturyan 18'; Sachywka 63'; Asipenka 77'; Yaraslawski 86'	Stadium: DYuSSh-1 Stadium

3 August 2008	Niva Chausy (A)	0–8	Belshina Bobruisk (II)	Chausy
18:00 UTC+3			Borisik 7'; Chernakovich 49'; Kowb 51', 65'; Migas 56', 81', 90'; Mironchik 74'	Stadium: City Stadium

6 August 2008	DSK Gomel (III)	1–3	Vertikal Kalinkovichi (III)	Gomel
18:00 UTC+3	Dobrovolyansky 45'		Bordak 61', 85'; Maewski 80'	Stadium: DYuSSh-8 Stadium

== Round of 32 ==
Sixteen winners of the First Round were paired against the sixteen teams of the Premier League. The games were played on 3, 4 and 7 September 2008.

3 September 2008	Zvezda-BGU Minsk (III)	1–4	Granit Mikashevichi	Minsk
16:00 UTC+3	A.Bakhno 37' (o.g.)		Hintaw 39' (pen.); A.Bakhno 61'; Vagner 79'; Lashankow 86'	Stadium: RCOP-BGU Stadium; Attendance: 250; Referee: Sergey Tsinkevich (Osipovichi)

3 September 2008	PMC Postavy (II)	1–3	MTZ-RIPO Minsk	Postavy
17:00 UTC+3	Groda 90+3'		Pehlić 12'; Sashcheka 36'; Kontsevoy 78'	Stadium: PMC Stadium; Attendance: 700; Referee: Igor Kruk (Molodechno)

3 September 2008	Vertikal Kalinkovichi (III)	0–4	Lokomotiv Minsk	Kalinkovichi
17:00 UTC+3			Papush 7'; Kolchin 14'; Stain 33', 45+1'	Stadium: Yunost Stadium; Attendance: 1,500; Referee: Vyacheslav Kolochinsky (Mogilev)

3 September 2008	Lida (II)	1–1 (a.e.t.) (1–3 p)	Neman Grodno	Lida
17:00 UTC+3	Tsybul 74'		Alumona 8' (pen.)	Stadium: City Stadium; Attendance: 1,500; Referee: Gennady Levchuk (Malorita)
	Penalties
	Lyubchuk (penalty scored); Matyuk (penalty missed); Tretyak (penalty missed); Prikhodko (penalty missed)		(penalty missed) Nadziewski; (penalty scored) Rahozhkin; (penalty scored) Semyonov; (penalty scored) Juvenal

4 September 2008	Vedrich-97 Rechitsa (II)	0–1	Smorgon	Rechitsa
16:00 UTC+3			Willer 50'	Stadium: Central Stadium; Attendance: 500; Referee: Sergey Tsybulskiy (Smolevichi)

4 September 2008	Veras Nesvizh (II)	0–2	Naftan Novopolotsk	Nesvizh
17:00 UTC+3			Truhaw 3'; Makowski 23'	Stadium: Urozhay Stadium; Attendance: 1,500; Referee: Nikita Pyreyev (Minsk)

4 September 2008	Osipovichi (III)	2–4 (a.e.t.)	Shakhtyor Soligorsk	Osipovichi
17:30 UTC+3	Pirozhnik 10'; Melnik 62'		Strypeykis 33'; Nikifarenka 67', 120'; Gatiyev 103'	Stadium: Yunost Stadium; Attendance: 1,000; Referee: Vladimir Serko (Grodno)

7 September 2008	Dinamo-Belcard Grodno (II)	0–0 (a.e.t.) (3–2 p)	Dnepr Mogilev	Grodno
16:00 UTC+3				Stadium: Neman Stadium; Attendance: 1,500; Referee: Andrey Soroka (Smolevichi)
	Penalties
	Sadownichy (penalty missed); Dudin (penalty scored); Rozumovich (penalty scored); German (penalty missed); Kuklevsky (penalty scored)		(penalty missed) Kalachow; (penalty scored) Maksimenko; (penalty scored) Matsveenka; (penalty missed) Kapaw; (penalty missed) Rawneyka

7 September 2008	Klechesk Kletsk (III)	0–5	Vitebsk	Kletsk
16:00 UTC+3			Zuew 10'; Irha 11'; Kagazezhev 12'; Dzivakow 59'; Usaw 60'	Stadium: City Stadium; Attendance: 1,000; Referee: Yury Fomin (Volkovysk)

7 September 2008	Khimik Svetlogorsk (II)	0–2	Gomel	Svetlogorsk
16:00 UTC+3			Rybak 12'; Maycon 90+3'	Stadium: Bumazhnik Stadium; Attendance: 1,500; Referee: Valery Vyalichka (Minsk)

7 September 2008	Minsk (II)	2–0	Savit Mogilev	Minsk
16:00 UTC+3	Mikhnavets 17'; Asipenka 55'			Stadium: Torpedo Stadium; Attendance: 200; Referee: Yuriy Maistrov (Fanipol)

7 September 2008	Neman Mosty (III)	3–7	BATE Borisov	Mosty
16:00 UTC+3	Narkovich 43'; Domas 79'; Kotin 90+2' (pen.)		Nyakhaychyk 12'; Bliznyuk 23'; Zhavnerchik 35'; Mirchev 38', 40', 74'; Sivakow 71'	Stadium: Neman Stadium; Attendance: 2,000; Referee: Oleg Cherepnev (Bobruisk)

7 September 2008	Belshina Bobruisk (II)	2–0	Dinamo Minsk	Bobruisk
17:00 UTC+3	Kowb 68' (pen.); Shukelovich 82'			Stadium: Spartak Stadium; Attendance: 3,500; Referee: Mikhail Lavsky (Gomel)

7 September 2008	Volna Pinsk (II)	3–2	Dinamo Brest	Pinsk
17:00 UTC+3	Taraschik 13', 79'; Shreitor 88'		Boyka 30'; Dzyameshka 36'	Stadium: Volna Stadium; Attendance: 3,000; Referee: Georgiy Verbitsky (Slonim)

7 September 2008	Slavia Mozyr (II)	1–3	Torpedo Zhodino	Mozyr
17:00 UTC+3	Trafimaw 71'		Grenkow 10'; Chedia 58'; Sherakow 88'	Stadium: Yunost Stadium; Attendance: 450; Referee: Vadim Panchenko (Mogilev)

7 September 2008	Kommunalnik Slonim (II)	1–0	Darida Minsk Raion	Slonim
17:00 UTC+3	Kolyadko 50'			Stadium: Yunost Stadium; Attendance: 900; Referee: Dmitry Yevnevich (Minsk)

== Round of 16 ==
The games were played as two-legged ties. The first legs were played on October 11, 12, 29 and November 4, 2008. The second legs were played on November 2 and 20, 2008.

Team 1	Agg.	Team 2	1st leg	2nd leg
BATE Borisov	(p) 5–5	Minsk (II)	1–4	4–1 (aet, p. 4–3)
MTZ-RIPO Minsk	6–2	Smorgon	4–0	2–2
Shakhtyor Soligorsk	10–0	Kommunalnik Slonim (II)	5–0	5–0
Belshina Bobruisk (II)	1–5	Granit Mikashevichi	1–4	0–1
Naftan Novopolotsk	7–0	Lokomotiv Minsk	3–0	4–0
Volna Pinsk (II)	2–6	Gomel	0–2	2–4
Dinamo-Belcard Grodno (II)	1–7	Neman Grodno	0–4	1–3
Vitebsk	3–2	Torpedo Zhodino	0–1	3–1 (aet)

=== First leg ===
11 October 2008	BATE Borisov	1–4	Minsk (II)	Borisov
18:00 UTC+3	Nyakhaychyk 47'		Asipenka 20' (pen.), 73'; Koshal 21'; Makaraw 37'	Stadium: City Stadium; Attendance: 2,500; Referee: Georgiy Verbitsky (Slonim)

12 October 2008	MTZ-RIPO Minsk	4–0	Smorgon	Minsk
14:00 UTC+3	Kontsevoy 33'; Camara 56'; Talkanitsa 85'; Kvaratskhelia 90+1'			Stadium: Traktor Stadium; Attendance: 200; Referee: Sergey Tsinkevich (Osipovichi)

29 October 2008	Shakhtyor Soligorsk	5–0	Kommunalnik Slonim (II)	Soligorsk
14:00 UTC+3	Nikifarenka 4', 13', 32'; Kurlovich 84' (o.g.); Zhukowski 88' (pen.)			Stadium: Stroitel Stadium; Attendance: 400; Referee: Valery Vyalichka (Minsk)

29 October 2008	Belshina Bobruisk (II)	1–4	Granit Mikashevichi	Bobruisk
14:00 UTC+3	Turlin 59'		Lashankow 9', 39'; D.Platonaw 70'; Vagner 83'	Stadium: Spartak Stadium; Attendance: 1,700; Referee: Sergey Sakharevich (Grodno)

29 October 2008	Naftan Novopolotsk	3–0	Lokomotiv Minsk	Novopolotsk
14:00 UTC+3	Razumaw 34'; Tarashchyk 48'; Kamarowski 73'			Stadium: Atlant Stadium; Attendance: 500; Referee: Igor Kruk (Molodechno)

29 October 2008	Volna Pinsk (II)	0–2	Gomel	Pinsk
17:00 UTC+3			Misyuk 57' (pen.), 90+2'	Stadium: Volna Stadium; Attendance: 2,509; Referee: Sergey Tsinkevich (Osipovichi)

29 October 2008	Dinamo-Belcard Grodno (II)	0–4	Neman Grodno	Grodno
18:30 UTC+3			Kavalyonak 42', 69'; Semyonov 71', 84'	Stadium: Neman Stadium; Attendance: 3,500; Referee: Anatoly Sednev (Mogilev)

4 November 2008	Vitebsk	0–1	Torpedo Zhodino	Vitebsk
18:00 UTC+3			Tsyarentsyew 62'	Stadium: Vitebsky CSK; Attendance: 1,500; Referee: Vitaly Sevostyanik (Grodno)

=== Second leg ===
2 November 2008	Smorgon	2–2 (2–6 agg.)	MTZ-RIPO Minsk	Smorgon
14:00 UTC+3	Kolodin 12' (pen.); Alhavik 90+1'		Kontsevoy 43', 85'	Stadium: Yunost Stadium; Attendance: 800; Referee: Sergey Tsinkevich (Osipovichi)

2 November 2008	Kommunalnik Slonim (II)	0–5 (0–10 agg.)	Shakhtyor Soligorsk	Slonim
14:00 UTC+3			Nikifarenka 4'; Martsinovich 18'; Strypeykis 47'; Ryas 58', 90'	Stadium: Yunost Stadium; Attendance: 400; Referee: Nikita Pyreyev (Minsk)

2 November 2008	Granit Mikashevichi	1–0 (5–1 agg.)	Belshina Bobruisk (II)	Brest
14:00 UTC+3	Yanush 29'			Stadium: OSK Brestskiy; Attendance: 300; Referee: Andrey Zhukov (Minsk)

2 November 2008	Lokomotiv Minsk	0–4 (0–7 agg.)	Naftan Novopolotsk	Molodechno
14:00 UTC+3			Kamarowski 10'; Makowski 52'; Rudzik 65'; Aleshchanka 77'	Stadium: City Stadium; Attendance: 200; Referee: Georgiy Verbitsky (Slonim)

2 November 2008	Gomel	4–2 (6–2 agg.)	Volna Pinsk (II)	Gomel
14:00 UTC+3	Hakobyan 2'; Bressan 84' (pen.); Mkrtchyan 88', 90+1'		Kuryanovich 5'; Shreitor 89'	Stadium: Central Stadium; Attendance: 1,500; Referee: Yury Fomin (Volkovysk)

2 November 2008	Neman Grodno	3–1 (7–1 agg.)	Dinamo-Belcard Grodno (II)	Grodno
14:00 UTC+3	Kavalyonak 19'; Chumachenko 25'; Semyonov 65'		Dolya 90+1'	Stadium: Neman Stadium; Attendance: 800; Referee: Aleksei Kulbakov (Gomel)

20 November 2008	Torpedo Zhodino	1–3 (a.e.t.) (2–3 agg.)	Vitebsk	Minsk
13:00 UTC+3	Chedia 120'		Hancharyk 24'; Tselykh 92'; Zuew 117'	Stadium: SOK Olimpiysky; Attendance: 400; Referee: Andrey Zhukov (Minsk)

20 November 2008	Minsk (II)	1–4 (a.e.t.) (5–5 (p.) agg.) (3–4 p)	BATE Borisov	Minsk
13:00 UTC+3	Khachaturyan 87'		Rodionov 45'; Krivets 72', 75'; Bliznyuk 90+3'	Stadium: Torpedo Stadium; Attendance: 1,000; Referee: Sergey Tsinkevich (Osipovichi)
	Penalties
	Branavitski (penalty scored); Sachywka (penalty missed); Asipenka (penalty missed); Makar (penalty scored); Koshal (penalty scored)		(penalty scored) Bliznyuk; (penalty scored) Krivets; (penalty scored) Nyakhaychyk; (penalty missed) Rodionov; (penalty scored) Mirchev

== Quarterfinals ==
The first legs were played on March 15, 2009. The second legs were played on March 21, 2009.

Team 1	Agg.	Team 2	1st leg	2nd leg
Shakhtyor Soligorsk	5–0	Granit Mikashevichi	2–0	3–0
BATE Borisov	2–1	Vitebsk	1–0	1–1
Gomel	2–2 (a)	Naftan Novopolotsk	1–2	1–0
MTZ-RIPO Minsk	0–3	Neman Grodno	0–0	0–3

=== First leg ===
15 March 2009	Shakhtyor Soligorsk	2–0	Granit Mikashevichi	Minsk
12:00 UTC+3	Bukatkin 40'; Nikifarenka 48'			Stadium: KFP Minsk; Attendance: 1,100; Referee: Andrey Zhukov (Minsk)

15 March 2009	BATE Borisov	1–0	Vitebsk	Minsk
14:00 UTC+3	Bulyga 66'			Stadium: Football Manege; Attendance: 1,300; Referee: Aleksandr Chebykin (Minsk)

15 March 2009	Gomel	1–2	Naftan Novopolotsk	Mogilev
15:00 UTC+3	Tsimashenka 39'		Verkhovtsov 2'; Truhaw 90'	Stadium: Gorono Stadium; Attendance: 500; Referee: Sergey Tsinkevich (Osipovichi)

15 March 2009	MTZ-RIPO Minsk	0–0	Neman Grodno	Minsk
17:00 UTC+3				Stadium: KFP Minsk; Attendance: 4,000; Referee: Anatoly Sednev (Mogilev)

=== Second leg ===
21 March 2009	Naftan Novopolotsk	0–1 ((a) 2–2 agg.)	Gomel	Vitebsk
12:00 UTC+3			A.Rabtsaw 59'	Stadium: Vitebsky CSK; Attendance: 400; Referee: Vitaly Sevostyanik (Grodno)

21 March 2009	Granit Mikashevichi	0–3 (0–5 agg.)	Shakhtyor Soligorsk	Pinsk
15:00 UTC+3			Ryas 46'; Lyavonchyk 55'; Grenkow 89'	Stadium: Volna Stadium; Attendance: 1,300; Referee: Sergey Sakharevich (Grodno)

21 March 2009	Vitebsk	1–1 (1–2 agg.)	BATE Borisov	Vitebsk
15:00 UTC+3	Kosak 82'		Krivets 67'	Stadium: Vitebsky CSK; Attendance: 1,500; Referee: Valery Vyalichka (Minsk)

21 March 2009	Neman Grodno	3–0 (3–0 agg.)	MTZ-RIPO Minsk	Grodno
15:30 UTC+3	Semyonov 22'; Dzenisevich 50', 53' (pen.)			Stadium: Neman Stadium; Attendance: 2,800; Referee: Aleksei Kulbakov (Gomel)

== Semifinals ==
The first legs were played on 9 April 2009. The second legs were played on 22 April 2009.

Team 1	Agg.	Team 2	1st leg	2nd leg
Neman Grodno	2–3	Shakhtyor Soligorsk	1–1	1–2 (aet)
Naftan Novopolotsk	3–0	BATE Borisov	1–0	2–0

=== First leg ===
9 April 2009	Neman Grodno	1–1	Shakhtyor Soligorsk	Grodno
15:30 UTC+3	Semyonov 58'		Hukayla 73'	Stadium: Neman Stadium; Attendance: 4,500; Referee: Valery Vyalichka (Minsk)

9 April 2009	Naftan Novopolotsk	1–0	BATE Borisov	Novopolotsk
16:30 UTC+3	Rudzik 89' (pen.)			Stadium: Atlant Stadium; Attendance: 4,000; Referee: Aleksei Kulbakov (Gomel)

=== Second leg ===
22 April 2009	Shakhtyor Soligorsk	2–1 (a.e.t.) (3–2 agg.)	Neman Grodno	Soligorsk
16:30 UTC+3	Hukayla 90'; D.Platonaw 116'		Chumachenko 49'	Stadium: Stroitel Stadium; Attendance: 1,820; Referee: Sergey Tsinkevich (Osipovichi)

22 April 2009	BATE Borisov	0–2 (0–3 agg.)	Naftan Novopolotsk	Borisov
18:00 UTC+3			Truhaw 32'; Strypeykis 61'	Stadium: City Stadium; Attendance: 4,500; Referee: Anatoly Sednev (Mogilev)

== Final ==
31 May 2009
18:00 UTC+3

Naftan Novopolotsk	2–1 (a.e.t.)	Shakhtyor Soligorsk
Strypeykis 42'; Verkhovtsov 95'		Kavalchuk 88'

Dinamo Stadium, Minsk
Attendance: 9,000
Referee: Andrey Zhukov (Minsk)

NAFTAN:
GK	1	(Belarus) Mikalay Ramanyuk
RB	4	(Belarus) Mihail Harbachow
CB	18	(Belarus) Dmitry Verkhovtsov
CB	15	(Belarus) Alyaksey Belavusaw (c)
LB	14	(Belarus) Maksim Karpovich
RM	10	(Belarus) Maksim Razumaw
CM	21	(Belarus) Ihar Truhaw
CM	7	(Belarus) Filip Rudzik	(yellow card) 24'
LM	17	(Belarus) Vital Valadzyankow		(substituted off) 29'
RF	13	(Belarus) Valery Strypeykis		(substituted off) 62'
LF	11	(Belarus) Dzmitry Kamarowski		(substituted off) 85'
Substitutes:
GK	71	(Belarus) Anton Kavalewski
DF	3	(Belarus) Uladzislaw Kasmynin
MF	5	(Belarus) Mikalay Yazerski
FW	9	(Belarus) Alyaksandr Yatskevich	(yellow card) 117'	(substituted on) 85'
MF	12	(Belarus) Alyaksandr Dzegtseraw		(substituted on) 29'
FW	20	(Belarus) Yawhen Zuew		(substituted on) 62'
MF	28	(Belarus) Dzmitry Hintaw
Manager:
(Belarus) Igor Kovalevich

SHAKHTYOR:
GK	16	(Latvia) Andrejs Pavlovs
RB	4	(Ukraine) Serhiy Ponomarenko		(substituted off) 62'
CB	30	(Belarus) Raman Kirenkin		(substituted off) 46'
CB	21	(Belarus) Pavel Plaskonny
LB	20	(Belarus) Syarhey Kavalchuk	(yellow card) 100'
RM	22	(Belarus) Syarhey Balanovich
CM	7	(Belarus) Andrey Lyavonchyk (c)
CM	28	(Belarus) Ihar Razhkow
LM	5	(Belarus) Valery Zhukowski	(yellow card) 119'
RM	26	(Belarus) Dzmitry Platonaw		(substituted off) 79'
CF	18	(Belarus) Ihar Zyulew	(yellow card) 89'
Substitutes:
GK	1	(Belarus) Vital Makawchyk
MF	9	(Belarus) Alyaksandr Grenkow		(substituted on) 46'
FW	10	(Belarus) Syarhey Nikifarenka		(substituted on) 62'
MF	11	(Belarus) Mihail Martsinovich		(substituted on) 79'
DF	12	(Belarus) Maksim Hukayla
DF	15	(Belarus) Alyaksey Yanushkevich
MF	17	(Belarus) Alyaksey Ryas
Manager:
(Ukraine) Anatoly Bogovik (caretaker)

== See also ==
- 2008 Belarusian Premier League
- 2009 Belarusian Premier League
