= 2010 Belarusian Super Cup =

| BATE Borisov | Naftan Novopolotsk |
| 0 | 0 |
- BATE won 3–2 on penalties
- Date: 8 March 2010
- Venue: Football Manege, Minsk
- Referee: Andrey Zhukov
- Attendance: 1,500

The 2010 Belarusian Super Cup was held on 8 March 2010 between the 2009 Belarusian Premier League champions BATE Borisov and the 2008–09 Belarusian Cup winner Naftan Novopolotsk. The match ended in a goalless draw at the conclusion of regulation time. BATE went on to win the match 3–2 on penalties.

== Match details ==
8 March 2010
15:00 UTC+3

| BATE Borisov | 0 – 0 | Naftan Novopolotsk |
|---|---|---|
| | Report |
Penalties
| Goharyan (penalty missed); Alumona (penalty scored); Kontsevoy (penalty missed); Nyakhaychyk (penalty scored); Stasevich (penalty scored) | 3–2 | (penalty missed) Zhukowski; (penalty missed) Zyulew; (penalty scored) Harbachow; (penalty missed) Juvenal; (penalty scored) Palitsevich |

Football Manege, Minsk
Attendance: 1,500
Referee: Andrey Zhukov (Minsk)

BATE:
| GK | 16 | (Belarus) Syarhey Vyeramko |
| DF | 25 | (Belarus) Dzmitry Baha | | (substituted off) 90+1' |
| DF | 14 | (Belarus) Artsyom Radzkow |
| DF | 3 | (Belarus) Sergey Sosnovski |
| DF | 5 | (Belarus) Alyaksandr Yurevich |
| MF | 17 | (Belarus) Alyaksandr Pawlaw | | (substituted off) 55' |
| MF | 8 | (Belarus) Alyaksandr Valadzko |
| MF | 2 | (Belarus) Dzmitry Likhtarovich (c) | | (substituted off) 55' |
| MF | 10 | (Brazil) Renan Bressan | | (substituted off) 87' |
| FW | 20 | (Belarus) Vitali Rodionov | | (substituted off) 77' |
| FW | 7 | (Belarus) Artem Kontsevoy | (yellow card) 29' |
Substitutes:
| GK | 30 | (Belarus) Alyaksandr Hutar |
| FW | 9 | (Armenia) Hovhannes Goharyan | (yellow card) 90+1' | (substituted on) 55' |
| FW | 11 | (Russia) Aleksandr Alumona | | (substituted on) 77' |
| MF | 13 | (Belarus) Pavel Nyakhaychyk | | (substituted on) 55' |
| FW | 15 | (Belarus) Maksim Skavysh |
| MF | 22 | (Belarus) Ihar Stasevich | | (substituted on) 90+1' |
| MF | 23 | (Belarus) Edhar Alyakhnovich | | (substituted on) 87' |
Manager:
(Belarus) Viktor Goncharenko

NAFTAN:
| GK | 1 | (Belarus) Mikalay Ramanyuk |
| DF | 4 | (Belarus) Mihail Harbachow |
| DF | 6 | (Belarus) Syarhey Palitsevich |
| DF | 2 | (Belarus) Artsyom Chelyadzinski |
| DF | 23 | (Brazil) Juvenal |
| MF | 9 | (Belarus) Alyaksandr Yatskevich |
| MF | 88 | (Belarus) Mikita Bukatkin | (yellow card) 22' | (substituted off) 90+2' |
| MF | 8 | (Belarus) Vital Tarashchyk (c) | | (substituted off) 71' |
| MF | 12 | (Belarus) Alyaksandr Dzegtseraw | | (substituted off) 90+2' |
| FW | 20 | (Belarus) Yawhen Zuew | | (substituted off) 60' |
| FW | 11 | (Belarus) Valery Strypeykis | (yellow card) 2' | (substituted off) 62' |
Substitutes:
| GK | 16 | (Belarus) Vitaly Ridlevich |
| DF | 5 | (Belarus) Mikalay Yazerski | | (substituted on) 90+2' |
| MF | 17 | (Belarus) Andrey Yakimov | | (substituted on) 90+2' |
| MF | 25 | (Belarus) Valery Zhukowski | | (substituted on) 71' |
| MF | 26 | (Belarus) Mikhail Gordeichuk | | (substituted on) 60' |
| DF | 28 | (Belarus) Vyachaslaw Holik |
| MF | 33 | (Belarus) Ihar Zyulew | (yellow card) 70' | (substituted on) 62' |
Manager:
(Belarus) Igor Kovalevich

== See also ==
- 2009 Belarusian Premier League
- 2008–09 Belarusian Cup
