= 2007–08 Belarusian Cup =

Tournament details
- Country: Belarus
- Teams: 48

Final positions
- Champions: MTZ-RIPO Minsk (2nd title)
- Runners-up: Shakhtyor Soligorsk

Tournament statistics
- Matches played: 59
- Goals scored: 151 (2.56 per match)
- Top goal scorer(s): Valery Strypeykis (7 goals)

The 2007–08 Belarusian Cup was the 17th edition of the football knock-out competition in Belarus.

Contrary to the league season, the competition has been conducted in a fall-spring rhythm. The first games were played on 28 July 2007 and the final on 18 May 2008. MTZ-RIPO Minsk won the Cup.

== First round ==
12 teams from the First League (out of 14, excluding Belshina Bobruisk and Lokomotiv Minsk who relegated from the Premier League after 2006 season), 13 teams from the Second League (out of 16, excluding three teams which were reserve squads for Premier and First League teams) and 7 amateur clubs started in this round. The games were played on 28 and 30 July 2007.

28 July 2007	Khimik Grodno (A)	1–4	Vedrich-97 Rechitsa (II)	Grodno
	Savonyako 65' (pen.)		Krawchanka 4'; Kotsur 40'; Tsimashenka 44'; V.Krot 84' (o.g.)

28 July 2007	Polesye Kozenki (III)	0–2	Lida (III)	Kozenki
			Grinyuk 45+1', 87'

28 July 2007	DUSSh Kirovsk (A)	0–4	Veras Nesvizh (II)	Kirovsk
			Rylinski 31'; Sarasek 40'; Kiriyevich 43'; Aharodnik 59' (pen.)

28 July 2007	Livadiya Dzerzhinsk (III)	0–3	Vertikal Kalinkovichi (III)	Dzerzhinsk
			Vasilevskiy 22'; Goptarevsky 72'; Sivkov 82'

28 July 2007	Gorodeya (A)	0–2	Mozyr (II)	Gorodeya
			Korotkevich 72' (pen.); Novak 83'

28 July 2007	Nalogovik Minsk (A)	0–0 (a.e.t.) (1–3 p)	Khimik Svetlogorsk (II)	Minsk

28 July 2007	PMK-7 Gantsevichi (A)	3–1	Polotsk (II)	Gantsevichi
	Gomza 31', 47'; Lesyuk 53'		Poteryakhin 81'

28 July 2007	Kobrin (A)	0–9	Savit Mogilev (II)	Kobrin
			Volkaw 28'; Ryzhankov 44', 51', 71', 89'; Shakaw 63', 82', 86'; Gavryutin 69'

28 July 2007	Osipovichi (III)	0–1	Kommunalnik Slonim (II)	Osipovichi
			Luzhankov 81'

28 July 2007	Neman Mosty (III)	1–4	Kommunalnik Zhlobin (III)	Mosty
	Baleyko 53'		Yefremov 3'; Aniskevich 18', 70'; Prokopyuk 35'

28 July 2007	Myasokombinat Vitebsk (III)	2–1	Granit-Mikashevichi (II)	Vitebsk
	Ushinsky 12', 82'		A.Bakhno 90' (pen.)

28 July 2007	Orsha (III)	0–3	Dinamo-Belcard Grodno (II)	Orsha
			Leshanyuk 21'; Balyuk 18', 70'; Prokopyuk 35'

28 July 2007	Bereza (III)	0–1	Volna Pinsk (II)	Bereza
			Balanovich 79'

28 July 2007	Molodechno (III)	1–5	Baranovichi (II)	Molodechno
	Stetskiy 17'		Shumeyko 3', 4', 7', 61'; Kukhley 66'

28 July 2007	Spartak Shklov (III)	3–1	PMC Postavy (III)	Shklov
	Baltrushevich 53' (pen.); Prontishev 57'; Bubelev 82'		Plechistik 72'

30 July 2007	Neftyanik Rechitsa (A)	0–1	Zvezda-BGU Minsk (II)	Rechitsa
			Sugako 70' (pen.)

== Round of 32 ==
16 winners of previous round were joined by 14 clubs from Premier League and two First League clubs which relegated from the Premier League after 2006 season. The games were played in August and September 2007.

16 August 2007	Zvezda-BGU Minsk (II)	1–2 (a.e.t.)	Lokomotiv Minsk (II)	Minsk
15:00 UTC+3	Kuzmenko 90+1'		Shmigero 66'; Markhel 112' (pen.)	Stadium: RCOP-BGU Stadium; Attendance: 100; Referee: Antuan Mayorov (Minsk)

16 August 2007	Vertikal Kalinkovichi (III)	0–3	Darida Minsk Raion	Kalinkovichi
17:00 UTC+3			Misyuk 10' (pen.); U.Makowski 77'; Vagner 86'	Stadium: Yunost Stadium; Attendance: 1,500; Referee: Vyacheslav Kolochinsky (Mogilev)

16 August 2007	Lida (III)	1–2	Dnepr Mogilev	Lida
17:00 UTC+3	Romanovskiy 55'		Hawrushka 66', 90+3'	Stadium: City Stadium; Attendance: 1,800; Referee: Sergey Tsybulskiy (Smolevichi)

16 August 2007	PMK-7 Gantsevichi (A)	2–3	MTZ-RIPO Minsk	Gantsevichi
17:30 UTC+3	Simonovich 56', 75'		Kontsevoy 30'; Strakhanovich 66' (pen.); Mamić 79'	Stadium: City Stadium; Attendance: 3,500; Referee: Valeriy Yazevich (Lida)

16 August 2007	Khimik Svetlogorsk (II)	1–0	Naftan Novopolotsk	Svetlogorsk
17:30 UTC+3	Zhdanovich 69'			Stadium: Bumazhnik Stadium; Attendance: 4,500; Referee: Andrey Soroka (Smolevichi)

16 August 2007	Kommunalnik Slonim (III)	0–5	Gomel	Slonim
17:30 UTC+3			Strypeykis 25', 33', 54', 55'; Vasilyuk 90+3'	Stadium: Yunost Stadium; Attendance: 1,000; Referee: Dmitry Yevnevich (Minsk)

16 August 2007	Baranovichi (II)	0–3	Neman Grodno	Baranovichi
17:30 UTC+3			Kryvobok 82', 84', 89'	Stadium: Lokomotiv Stadium; Attendance: 4,000; Referee: Anatoly Sednev (Mogilev)

16 August 2007	Kommunalnik Zhlobin (III)	1–1 (a.e.t.) (2–1 p)	Smorgon	Rogachev
18:00 UTC+3	Simonenko 35'		Bobovych 9'	Stadium: DYuSSh Stadium; Attendance: 700; Referee: Dmitry Abushkevich (Mogilev)

16 August 2007	Volna Pinsk (II)	0–1	Dinamo Brest	Pinsk
18:00 UTC+3			Trotsyuk 64'	Stadium: Volna Stadium; Attendance: 3,000; Referee: Viktor Chernik (Mosty)

16 August 2007	Vedrich-97 Rechitsa (II)	0–1	Minsk	Rechitsa
18:00 UTC+3			Krawchanka 59' (o.g.)	Stadium: Central Stadium; Attendance: 1,200; Referee: Aleksandr Skrob (Stolbtsy)

16 August 2007	Dinamo-Belcard Grodno (II)	1–2	Vitebsk	Grodno
18:00 UTC+3	Mikhalyuk 90+2'		Usaw 15'; Sitko 53'	Stadium: Neman Stadium; Attendance: 1,200; Referee: Nikita Pyreyev (Minsk)

16 August 2007	Veras Nesvizh (II)	2–0	Belshina Bobruisk (II)	Nesvizh
18:00 UTC+3	Rylinski 71' (pen.); Yatskevich 84'			Stadium: Urozhay Stadium; Attendance: 1,150; Referee: Valery Vyalichka (Minsk)

19 August 2007	Spartak Shklov (III)	0–2	BATE Borisov	Shklov
17:00 UTC+3			Bliznyuk 32'; Sivakow 61'	Stadium: Spartak Stadium; Attendance: 1,500; Referee: Vitaly Sevostyanik (Grodno)

5 September 2007	Savit Mogilev (II)	0–2	Shakhtyor Soligorsk	Mogilev
17:00 UTC+3			Krot 22'; Nikifarenka 60'	Stadium: Torpedo Stadium; Attendance: 2,800; Referee: Vitaly Sevostyanik (Grodno)

6 September 2007	Myasokombinat Vitebsk (III)	2–0	Torpedo Zhodino	Vitebsk
17:00 UTC+3	Putkin 33'; Sigov 55'			Stadium: CSK Vitebsky; Attendance: 500; Referee: Viktor Verbitsky (Kobrin)

11 September 2007	Mozyr (II)	1–4	Dinamo Minsk	Mozyr
17:00 UTC+3	Korotkevich 45+1'		Rák 22' (pen.), 62'; Edu 71'; Putsila 73'	Stadium: Yunost Stadium; Attendance: 1,500; Referee: Sergey Tsinkevich (Osipovichi)

== Round of 16 ==
The first legs were played on 15 and 16 March 2008. The second legs were played on 21 and 22 March 2008.

Team 1	Agg.	Team 2	1st leg	2nd leg
Lokomotiv Minsk	1–2	Dinamo Minsk	0–2	1–0
Dinamo Brest	2–3	Gomel	0–2	2–1
Minsk (II)	2–4	Shakhtyor Soligorsk	0–1	2–3
Dnepr Mogilev	2–0	Vitebsk	1–0	1–0
Darida Minsk Raion	2–0	Neman Grodno	1–0	1–0
Khimik Svetlogorsk (II)	2–0	Myasokombinat Vitebsk (III)	1–0	1–0
BATE Borisov	2–0	Veras Nesvizh (II)	1–0	1–0
Kommunalnik Zhlobin (III)	w/o^{1}	MTZ-RIPO Minsk		

^{1} Kommunalnik Zhlobin withdrew from the Cup due to bankruptcy.

=== First leg ===
15 March 2008	Lokomotiv Minsk	0–2	Dinamo Minsk	Minsk
15:00 UTC+3			Kislyak 63'; Hihevich 65'	Stadium: KFP Minsk; Attendance: 1,000; Referee: Valery Vyalichka (Minsk)

15 March 2008	Dinamo Brest	0–2	Gomel	Brest
16:00 UTC+3			Kobets 33'; Drahun 65'	Stadium: Dinamo Stadium; Attendance: 2,500; Referee: Sergey Sakharevich (Grodno)

15 March 2008	Minsk (II)	0–1	Shakhtyor Soligorsk	Minsk
18:00 UTC+3			Hukayla 37'	Stadium: KFP Minsk; Attendance: 1,000; Referee: Vitaly Sevostyanik (Grodno)

16 March 2008	Dnepr Mogilev	1–0	Vitebsk	Minsk
14:00 UTC+3	Hawrushka 62'			Stadium: Football Manege; Attendance: 600; Referee: Sergey Shmolik (Brest)

16 March 2008	Darida Minsk Raion	1–0	Neman Grodno	Minsk
14:00 UTC+3	Yatskevich 46'			Stadium: RCOP-BGU Stadium; Attendance: 300; Referee: Aleksei Kulbakov (Gomel)

16 March 2008	Khimik Svetlogorsk (II)	1–0	Myasokombinat Vitebsk (III)	Svetlogorsk
15:00 UTC+3	Novitskiy 62'			Stadium: Bumazhnik Stadium; Attendance: 4,000; Referee: Sergey Tsinkevich (Osipovichi)

16 March 2008	BATE Borisov	1–0	Veras Nesvizh (II)	Minsk
17:00 UTC+3	Rodionov 56'			Stadium: Football Manege; Attendance: 2,000; Referee: Yuriy Maistrov (Fanipol)

=== Second leg ===
21 March 2008	Veras Nesvizh (II)	0–1 (0–2 agg.)	BATE Borisov	Minsk
12:00 UTC+3			Bliznyuk 23'	Stadium: KFP Minsk; Attendance: 400; Referee: Aleksandr Chebykin (Minsk)

21 March 2008	Vitebsk	0–1 (0–2 agg.)	Dnepr Mogilev	Vitebsk
14:00 UTC+3			Hawrushka 60'	Stadium: CSK Vitebsky; Attendance: 1,400; Referee: Andrey Zhukov (Minsk)

21 March 2008	Dinamo Minsk	0–1 (2–1 agg.)	Lokomotiv Minsk	Minsk
15:00 UTC+3			Shvydakow 43'	Stadium: KFP Minsk; Attendance: 700; Referee: Georgiy Verbitsky (Slonim)

22 March 2008	Myasokombinat Vitebsk (III)	0–1 (0–2 agg.)	Khimik Svetlogorsk (II)	Vitebsk
12:00 UTC+3			Gavrilovich 90+1'	Stadium: CSK Vitebsky; Attendance: 1,000; Referee: Igor Kruk (Molodechno)

22 March 2008	Gomel	1–2 (3–2 agg.)	Dinamo Brest	Gomel
15:00 UTC+3	Živković 7'		Kozak 43'; Ryzhevski 65'	Stadium: Central Stadium; Attendance: 5,100; Referee: Nikita Pyreyev (Minsk)

22 March 2008	Shakhtyor Soligorsk	3–2 (4–2 agg.)	Minsk (II)	Soligorsk
15:00 UTC+3	Zhukowski 14'; Gatiyev 31' (pen.); Bychanok 70'		Asipenka 11'; Pyatrawskas 69'	Stadium: Stroitel Stadium; Attendance: 1,730; Referee: Sergey Shmolik (Brest)

22 March 2008	Neman Grodno	0–1 (0–2 agg.)	Darida Minsk Raion	Grodno
15:00 UTC+3			Shapyatowski 2'	Stadium: GrGU Stadium; Attendance: 2,300; Referee: Aleksei Kulbakov (Gomel)

== Quarterfinals ==
The first legs were played on 29 March 2008. The second legs were played on 2 April 2008.

Team 1	Agg.	Team 2	1st leg	2nd leg
Dnepr Mogilev	0–1	Dinamo Minsk	0–0	0–1 (aet)
Darida Minsk Raion	1–3	Shakhtyor Soligorsk	1–2	0–1
Khimik Svetlogorsk (II)	1–3	BATE Borisov	1–3	0–0
MTZ-RIPO Minsk	4–2	Gomel	4–0	0–2

=== First leg ===
29 March 2008	Dnepr Mogilev	0–0	Dinamo Minsk	Vitebsk
12:00 UTC+3				Stadium: CSK Vitebsky; Attendance: 1,000; Referee: Sergey Sakharevich (Grodno)

29 March 2008	Darida Minsk Raion	1–2	Shakhtyor Soligorsk	Minsk
14:00 UTC+3	Shapyatowski 60'		Strypeykis 46', 77'	Stadium: KFP Minsk; Attendance: 1,000; Referee: Aleksandr Chebykin (Minsk)

29 March 2008	Khimik Svetlogorsk (II)	1–3	BATE Borisov	Svetlogorsk
15:00 UTC+3	Gavrilovich 60'		Bliznyuk 4', 64'; D.Platonaw 74'	Stadium: Bumazhnik Stadium; Attendance: 5,000; Referee: Valery Vyalichka (Minsk)

29 March 2008	MTZ-RIPO Minsk	4–0	Gomel	Minsk
17:00 UTC+3	V.Hleb 32' (pen.); Sashcheka 53'; Ceolin 66' (pen.); Strakhanovich 89'			Stadium: KFP Minsk; Attendance: 1,000; Referee: Igor Kruk (Molodechno)

=== Second leg ===
2 April 2008	BATE Borisov	0–0 (3–1 agg.)	Khimik Svetlogorsk (II)	Minsk
13:00 UTC+3				Stadium: KFP Minsk; Attendance: 300; Referee: Dmitry Yevnevich (Minsk)

2 April 2008	Shakhtyor Soligorsk	1–0 (3–1 agg.)	Darida Minsk Raion	Soligorsk
15:30 UTC+3	Bychanok 80'			Stadium: Stroitel Stadium; Attendance: 1,700; Referee: Andrey Zhukov (Minsk)

2 April 2008	Dinamo Minsk	1–0 (a.e.t.) (1–0 agg.)	Dnepr Mogilev	Minsk
18:00 UTC+3	Lebedzew 103'			Stadium: Dinamo Stadium; Attendance: 2,300; Referee: Yuriy Maistrov (Fanipol)

2 April 2008	Gomel	2–0 (2–4 agg.)	MTZ-RIPO Minsk	Gomel
18:00 UTC+3	Drahun 40'; Bressan 85'			Stadium: Central Stadium; Attendance: 5,000; Referee: Sergey Tsinkevich (Osipovichi)

== Semifinals ==
The first legs were played on 16 April 2008. The second legs were played on 30 April 2008.

Team 1	Agg.	Team 2	1st leg	2nd leg
Shakhtyor Soligorsk	4–2	Dinamo Minsk	1–0	3–2
BATE Borisov	3–6	MTZ-RIPO Minsk	2–4	1–2

=== First leg ===
16 April 2008	Shakhtyor Soligorsk	1–0	Dinamo Minsk	Soligorsk
17:00 UTC+3	Lyavonchyk 38'			Stadium: Stroitel Stadium; Attendance: 2,580; Referee: Andrey Zhukov (Minsk)

16 April 2008	BATE Borisov	2–4	MTZ-RIPO Minsk	Borisov
18:00 UTC+3	Nyakhaychyk 11'; Likhtarovich 31'		Eramchuk 24', 90+4'; Kontsevoy 37'; V.Hleb 69'	Stadium: City Stadium; Attendance: 2,200; Referee: Aleksei Kulbakov (Gomel)

=== Second leg ===
30 April 2008	MTZ-RIPO Minsk	2–1 (a.e.t.) (6–3 agg.)	BATE Borisov	Minsk
17:00 UTC+3	Camara 29'; V.Hleb 44'		Bliznyuk 81' (pen.)	Stadium: Traktor Stadium; Attendance: 3,200; Referee: Aleksei Kulbakov (Gomel)

30 April 2008	Dinamo Minsk	2–3 (a.e.t.) (2–4 agg.)	Shakhtyor Soligorsk	Minsk
19:00 UTC+3	Shkabara 56'; Rák 61' (pen.)		Zhukowski 38' (pen.); Bychanok 48'; Hukayla 54'	Stadium: Dinamo Stadium; Attendance: 3,000; Referee: Andrey Zhukov (Minsk)

== Final ==
18 May 2008
18:00 UTC+3

Shakhtyor Soligorsk	1–2	MTZ-RIPO Minsk
Strypeykis 82'	Report	V.Hleb 5'; Strakhanovich 83'

Dinamo Stadium, Minsk
Attendance: 8,500
Referee: Aleksei Kulbakov (Gomel)

SHAKHTYOR:
GK	16	(Belarus) Uladzimir Haew
DF	2	(Belarus) Alyaksandr Bylina
DF	20	(Belarus) Syarhey Kavalchuk
DF	30	(Belarus) Mikalay Branfilaw
DF	12	(Belarus) Maksim Hukayla	(yellow card) 45'
MF	7	(Belarus) Andrey Lyavonchyk (c)
MF	8	(Belarus) Mikita Bukatkin		(substituted off) 46'
MF	11	(Belarus) Mihail Martsinovich		(substituted off) 52'
MF	21	(Belarus) Syarhey Balanovich		(substituted off) 74'
MF	5	(Belarus) Valery Zhukowski	(yellow card) 75'
FW	10	(Belarus) Syarhey Nikifarenka
Substitutes:
GK	33	(Belarus) Ihar Hamlyak
FW	15	(Belarus) Valery Strypeykis		(substituted on) 74'
MF	17	(Belarus) Alyaksey Ryas
FW	18	(Belarus) Ihar Zyulew		(substituted on) 52'
DF	22	(Belarus) Alyaksandr Bychanok		(substituted on) 46'
FW	27	(Belarus) Syarhey Krot
DF	29	(Russia) Eduard Gatiyev
Manager:
(Belarus) Yury Vyarheychyk

MTZ-RIPO:
GK	1	(Belarus) Alyaksandr Sulima (c)
DF	3	(Belarus) Alyaksandr Stashchanyuk
DF	4	(Bosnia and Herzegovina) Dilaver Zrnanović
DF	16	(Belarus) Mikalay Asipovich
DF	25	(Belarus) Mihail Eramchuk
MF	6	(Senegal) Aboubacar Camara	(yellow card) 31'	(substituted off) 59'
MF	11	(Belarus) Dzmitry Shchagrykovich		(substituted off) 68'
MF	8	(Belarus) Oleg Strakhanovich	(yellow card) 54' (yellow-red card) 84'
MF	10	(Belarus) Dzyanis Sashcheka		(substituted off) 78'
FW	9	(Belarus) Vyacheslav Hleb
FW	7	(Belarus) Artem Kontsevoy
Substitutes:
GK	12	(Belarus) Yahor Hatkevich
DF	2	(Belarus) Alyaksandr Skshynetski
MF	13	(Belarus) Alyaksandr Talkanitsa		(substituted on) 78'
DF	14	(Belarus) Aleh Popel
MF	17	(Brazil) Nicolas Ceolin		(substituted on) 59'
MF	19	(Belarus) Anton Bubnow		(substituted on) 68'
MF	23	(Azerbaijan) Elmar Xeyirov
Manager:
(Belarus) Yuri Puntus
