= 2009 Commonwealth of Independent States Cup =

CIS Cup, Кубок Содружества 2009

Tournament details
- Host country: Russia
- Dates: 17–25 January 2009
- Teams: 16
- Venues: 2 (in 1 host city)

Final positions
- Champions: (Moldova) Sheriff Tiraspol (2nd title)

Tournament statistics
- Matches played: 31
- Goals scored: 84 (2.71 per match)
- Attendance: 32,400 (1,045 per match)
- Top scorer(s): (Russia) Aleksandr Yerokhin (Latvia) Vīts Rimkus (Tajikistan) Ibrahim Rabimov (4 goals)

The 2009 Commonwealth of Independent States Cup was the seventeenth edition of the competition between the champions of former republics of Soviet Union. It was won by Sheriff Tiraspol for the second time.

== Participants ==
Team	Qualification	Participation
(Russia) Rubin Kazan	2008 Russian Premier League champions ^{1}	1st
(Ukraine) Shakhtar Donetsk	2007–08 Vyshcha Liha champions ^{2}	5th
(Belarus) MTZ-RIPO Minsk	2008 Belarusian Premier League 3rd team ^{3}	1st
(Lithuania) Ekranas Panevėžys	2008 A Lyga champions	2nd
(Latvia) Ventspils	2008 Latvian Higher League champions	3rd
(Estonia) Levadia Tallinn	2008 Meistriliiga champions	6th
(Moldova) Sheriff Tiraspol	2007–08 Moldovan National Division champions	8th
(Armenia) Ararat Yerevan	2008 Armenian Premier League runners-up ^{4}	2nd
(Azerbaijan) Inter Baku	2007–08 Azerbaijan Premier League champions	1st
(Kazakhstan) Aktobe	2008 Kazakhstan Premier League champions	4th
(Uzbekistan) Pakhtakor Tashkent	2008 Uzbek League runners-up ^{5}	8th
(Tajikistan) Regar-TadAZ Tursunzoda	2008 Tajik League champions	8th
(Turkmenistan) Aşgabat	2008 Ýokary Liga champions	2nd
(Kyrgyzstan) Dordoi-Dynamo Naryn	2008 Kyrgyzstan League champions	5th
(Finland) Inter Turku	2008 Veikkausliiga champions ^{6}	1st
Russia U21	Unofficial entry, not eligible to advance past group stage	7th

- ^{1} Rubin Kazan were represented by reserve players with addition of a few main team players.
- ^{2} Shakhtar Donetsk were represented by a reserve team Shakhtar-3 Donetsk.
- ^{3} MTZ-RIPO Minsk replaced BATE Borisov (2008 Belarusian champions), who declined to participate.
- ^{4} Ararat Yerevan replaced Pyunik Yerevan (2008 Armenian champions), who declined to participate in the aftermath of 2006 semifinal incident.
- ^{5} Pakhtakor Tashkent replaced Bunyodkor Tashkent (2008 Uzbekistan champions), who declined to participate.
- ^{6} Inter Turku invited by the organizing committee to replace (Georgia (country)) Dinamo Tbilisi (2007–08 Georgian champions), who declined to participate along with other Georgian teams due to the Russo-Georgian War.

== Group stage ==
=== Group A ===
Team	Pld	W	D	L	GF	GA	GD	Pts
(Kazakhstan) Aktobe	3	2	1	0	6	2	+4	7
(Uzbekistan) Pakhtakor Tashkent	3	1	2	0	6	3	+3	5
(Russia) Rubin Kazan	3	1	1	1	4	5	−1	4
(Armenia) Ararat Yerevan	3	0	0	3	4	10	−6	0

==== Results ====
17 January 2009
19:00

Rubin Kazan (Russia)	1 – 1	(Uzbekistan) Pakhtakor Tashkent
Kabze 51'		Geynrikh 13'

Olympic Sport Complex, Moscow
Attendance: 3,500
Referee: Vusal Aliyev (Azerbaijan)
17 January 2009
19:00

Ararat Yerevan (Armenia)	1 – 3	(Kazakhstan) Aktobe
N.Erzrumian 76'		Khairullin 12', 32'; Ostapenko 44'

Dynamo Manage, Moscow
Attendance: 200
Referee: Muzaffar Abdullaev (Kyrgyzstan)

18 January 2009
19:00

Rubin Kazan (Russia)	0 – 2	(Kazakhstan) Aktobe
		Kenzhesariyev 41'; Strukov 59'

Olympic Sport Complex, Moscow
Attendance: 1,700
Referee: Andrejs Sipailo (Latvia)
18 January 2009
19:00

Pakhtakor Tashkent (Uzbekistan)	4 – 1	(Armenia) Ararat Yerevan
Geynrikh 17'; Iheruome 36'; Akhmedov 42'; Z.Tadjiev 58'		Nranyan 33'

Dynamo Manage, Moscow
Attendance: 500
Referee: Sergey Tsinkevich (Belarus)

20 January 2009
19:00

Rubin Kazan (Russia)	3 – 2	(Armenia) Ararat Yerevan
Kabze 60', 67' (pen.); Kulikov 84'		Movsisian 26'; S.Erzrumian 55'

Olympic Sport Complex, Moscow
Attendance: 1,000
Referee: Oleh Oriekhov (Ukraine)
20 January 2009
19:00

Pakhtakor Tashkent (Uzbekistan)	1 – 1	(Kazakhstan) Aktobe
Iheruome 18'		Tleshev 38'

Dynamo Manage, Moscow
Attendance: 300
Referee: Allabergen Sapaev (Turkmenistan)

=== Group B ===
- Unofficial table

Team	Pld	W	D	L	GF	GA	GD	Pts
(Lithuania) Ekranas Panevėžys	3	3	0	0	6	1	+5	9
(Belarus) MTZ-RIPO Minsk	3	2	0	1	6	2	+4	6
Russia U21	3	0	1	2	0	3	−3	1
(Turkmenistan) Aşgabat	3	0	1	2	1	7	−6	1

- Official table

Team	Pld	W	D	L	GF	GA	GD	Pts
(Lithuania) Ekranas Panevėžys	2	2	0	0	5	1	+4	6
(Belarus) MTZ-RIPO Minsk	2	1	0	1	4	2	+2	3
(Turkmenistan) Aşgabat	2	0	0	2	1	7	−6	0

==== Results ====
17 January 2009
17:00

Aşgabat (Turkmenistan)	0 – 0	Russia U21

Olympic Sport Complex, Moscow
Attendance: 2,300
Referee: Aleksandr Gauzer (Kazakhstan)
17 January 2009
17:00

Ekranas Panevėžys (Lithuania)	2 – 0	(Belarus) MTZ-RIPO Minsk
Rähn 75'; Bička 78'

Dynamo Manage, Moscow
Attendance: 200
Referee: Kristo Tohver (Estonia)

18 January 2009
17:00

Russia U21	0 – 1	(Lithuania) Ekranas Panevėžys
		Matović 13'

Olympic Sport Complex, Moscow
Attendance: 2,000
Referee: Vadim Agishev (Uzbekistan)
18 January 2009
17:00

Aşgabat (Turkmenistan)	0 – 4	(Belarus) MTZ-RIPO Minsk
		Sashcheka 17'; Camara 42'; Ceolin 54', 57'

Dynamo Manage, Moscow
Attendance: 1,000
Referee: Ghenadie Sidenco (Moldova)

20 January 2009
17:00

Russia U21	0 – 2	(Belarus) MTZ-RIPO Minsk
		Ceolin 54'; Sashcheka 89'

Olympic Sport Complex, Moscow
Attendance: 500
Referee: Kristo Tohver (Estonia)
20 January 2009
17:00

Aşgabat (Turkmenistan)	1 – 3	(Lithuania) Ekranas Panevėžys
Mingazow 90'		Pogreban 48'; Trakys 71', 86'

Dynamo Manage, Moscow
Attendance: 300
Referee: Sergei Karasev (Russia)

=== Group C ===
Team	Pld	W	D	L	GF	GA	GD	Pts
(Moldova) Sheriff Tiraspol	3	2	1	0	6	1	+5	7
(Tajikistan) Regar-TadAZ Tursunzoda	3	1	1	1	6	4	+2	4
(Ukraine) Shakhtar Donetsk	3	1	0	2	3	9	−6	3
(Estonia) Levadia Tallinn	3	0	2	1	2	3	−1	2

==== Results ====
17 January 2009
15:00

Shakhtar Donetsk (Ukraine)	0 – 4	(Moldova) Sheriff Tiraspol
		Yerokhin 21', 28', 66'; Bulat 23'

Olympic Sport Complex, Moscow
Attendance: 1,000
Referee: Vladislav Bezborodov (Russia)
17 January 2009
15:00

Levadia Tallinn (Estonia)	1 – 1	(Tajikistan) Regar-TadAZ Tursunzoda
Andreyev 25'		Ortikov 7'

Dynamo Manage, Moscow
Attendance: 100
Referee: Yuri Baskakov (Russia)

18 January 2009
15:00

Shakhtar Donetsk (Ukraine)	2 – 1	(Estonia) Levadia Tallinn
Pryyomov 9'; Bredun 80'		Gussev 38'

Olympic Sport Complex, Moscow
Attendance: 500
Referee: Aleksandr Kolobaev (Russia)
18 January 2009
15:00

Sheriff Tiraspol (Moldova)	2 – 1	(Tajikistan) Regar-TadAZ Tursunzoda
Yerokhin 48'; Suvorov 55'		Rabimov 37'

Dynamo Manage, Moscow
Attendance: 400
Referee: Almir Kayumov (Russia)

20 January 2009
15:00

Sheriff Tiraspol (Moldova)	0 – 0	(Estonia) Levadia Tallinn

Olympic Sport Complex, Moscow
Attendance: 500
Referee: Maksim Layushkin (Russia)
20 January 2009
15:00

Shakhtar Donetsk (Ukraine)	1 – 4	(Tajikistan) Regar-TadAZ Tursunzoda
Nasibulin 73'		Rabimov 36', 48', 59'; Makhmudov 39'

Dynamo Manage, Moscow
Attendance: 300
Referee: Aleksandr Gauzer (Kazakhstan)

=== Group D ===
Team	Pld	W	D	L	GF	GA	GD	Pts
(Azerbaijan) Inter Baku	3	2	1	0	5	1	+4	7
(Latvia) Ventspils	3	2	0	1	4	3	+1	6
(Kyrgyzstan) Dordoi-Dynamo Naryn	3	0	2	1	3	4	−1	2
(Finland) Inter Turku	3	0	1	2	5	9	−4	1

==== Results ====
17 January 2009
13:00

Ventspils (Latvia)	3 – 1	(Finland) Inter Turku
Rimkus 4', 15', 42'		Ojala 30'

Olympic Sport Complex, Moscow
Attendance: 800
Referee: Sergei Karasev (Russia)
17 January 2009
13:00

Dordoi-Dynamo Naryn (Kyrgyzstan)	0 – 0	(Azerbaijan) Inter Baku

Dynamo Manage, Moscow
Attendance: 500
Referee: Nerijus Dunauskas (Lithuania)

18 January 2009
13:00

Inter Turku (Finland)	1 – 3	(Azerbaijan) Inter Baku
Seppälä 48'		Rubins 24'; Kh.Mammadov 32'; Guglielmone 75' (pen.)

Olympic Sport Complex, Moscow
Attendance: 530
Referee: Oleh Oriekhov (Ukraine)
18 January 2009
13:00

Ventspils (Latvia)	1 – 0	(Kyrgyzstan) Dordoi-Dynamo Naryn
Rimkus 90'

Dynamo Manage, Moscow
Attendance: 200
Referee: Karen Nalbandyan (Armenia)

20 January 2009
13:00

Inter Baku (Azerbaijan)	2 – 0	(Latvia) Ventspils
Červenka 51'; Andaveris 87'

Olympic Sport Complex, Moscow
Attendance: 150
Referee: Vladislav Bezborodov (Russia)
20 January 2009
13:00

Dordoi-Dynamo Naryn (Kyrgyzstan)	3 – 3	(Finland) Inter Turku
Kum 20'; Tagoe 73'; Sydykov 89'		Seppälä 18'; Furuholm 52'; Mäkilä 82'

Dynamo Manage, Moscow
Attendance: 300
Referee: Ravshan Ishmatov (Tajikistan)

== Final rounds ==
=== Bracket ===
Quarter-finals (21 Jan)
(Lithuania)	Ekranas Panevėžys	1
(Uzbekistan)	Pakhtakor Tashkent (p)	1
(Moldova)	Sheriff Tiraspol (p)	0
(Latvia)	Ventspils	0
(Azerbaijan)	Inter Baku	2
(Tajikistan)	Regar-TadAZ Tursunzoda	0
(Kazakhstan)	Aktobe	4
(Belarus)	MTZ-RIPO Minsk	1

Semi-finals (23 Jan)
(Uzbekistan)	Pakhtakor Tashkent	2
(Moldova)	Sheriff Tiraspol (p)	2
(Azerbaijan)	Inter Baku	0
(Kazakhstan)	Aktobe	1

Final (25 Jan)
(Moldova)	Sheriff Tiraspol (p)	1
(Kazakhstan)	Aktobe	1

=== Quarter-finals ===
21 January 2009
13:00

Inter Baku (Azerbaijan)	2 – 0	(Tajikistan) Regar-TadAZ Tursunzoda
Rubins 24'; Guglielmone 48' (pen.)

Olympic Sport Complex, Moscow
Attendance: 1,000
Referee: Yuri Baskakov (Russia)
21 January 2009
15:00

Ekranas Panevėžys (Lithuania)	1 – 1	(Uzbekistan) Pakhtakor Tashkent
Bička 48' (pen.)		Kletskov 45'
Penalties
Sasnauskas (penalty missed); Bička (penalty scored); Markevičius (penalty missed); Padaigis (penalty scored)	2 – 4	(penalty missed) Geynrikh; (penalty scored) Marković; (penalty scored) Andreev; (penalty scored) Kletskov; (penalty scored) Iheruome

Olympic Sport Complex, Moscow
Attendance: 2,000
Referee: Almir Kayumov (Russia)
21 January 2009
17:00

Sheriff Tiraspol (Moldova)	0 – 0	(Latvia) Ventspils
Penalties
Corneencov (penalty scored); Mandrîcenco (penalty scored); Markevičius (penalty missed); Tarkhnishvili (penalty scored); Karpovich (penalty scored); Rouamba (penalty scored)	5 – 4	(penalty scored) Cilinšek; (penalty scored) Menteshashvili; (penalty scored) Žigajevs; (penalty missed) Kačanovs; (penalty scored) Rimkus; (penalty missed) Kosmačovs

Olympic Sport Complex, Moscow
Attendance: 1,500
Referee: Karen Nalbandyan (Armenia)
21 January 2009
19:00

Aktobe (Kazakhstan)	4 – 1	(Belarus) MTZ-RIPO Minsk
Strukov 10'; Tleshev 53', 54'; Khairullin 60'		Popel 42'

Olympic Sport Complex, Moscow
Attendance: 1,300
Referee: Andrejs Sipailo (Latvia)

=== Semi-finals ===
23 January 2009
16:00

Pakhtakor Tashkent (Uzbekistan)	2 – 2	(Moldova) Sheriff Tiraspol
Rodríguez 22' (o.g.); Andreev 71'		Corneencov 50'; Nadson 76'
Penalties
Geynrikh (penalty scored); Marković (penalty missed); Bayramov (penalty missed); Kletskov (penalty scored); Andreev (penalty scored)	3 – 4	(penalty scored) Suvorov; (penalty missed) Mandrîcenco; (penalty scored) Mamah; (penalty scored) Tarkhnishvili; (penalty scored) Rodríguez

Olympic Sport Complex, Moscow
Attendance: 1,520
Referee: Oleh Oriekhov (Ukraine)
23 January 2009
19:00

Inter Baku (Azerbaijan)	0 – 1	(Kazakhstan) Aktobe
		Asanbayev 44'

Olympic Sport Complex, Moscow
Attendance: 3,000
Referee: Almir Kayumov (Russia)

=== Final ===
25 January 2009
13:00

Sheriff Tiraspol (Moldova)	1 – 1	(Kazakhstan) Aktobe
Suvorov 8' (pen.)		Logvinenko 65'
Penalties
Bulat (penalty scored); Volkov (penalty scored); Mamah (penalty scored); Tarkhnishvili (penalty scored); Rouamba (penalty scored)	5 – 4	(penalty scored) Khairullin; (penalty missed) Kenzhesariyev; (penalty scored) Lavrik; (penalty scored) Golovskoy; (penalty scored) Tleshev

Olympic Sport Complex, Moscow
Attendance: 3,700
Referee: Maksim Layushkin (Russia)

== Top scorers ==
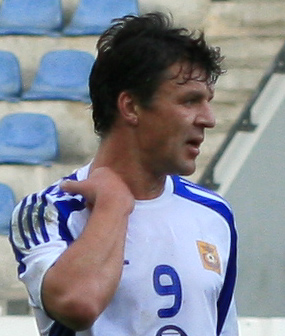
Vīts Rimkus, one of tournament's top scorers

Rank	Player	Team	Goals
1	(Russia) Aleksandr Yerokhin	(Moldova) Sheriff Tiraspol	4
1	(Latvia) Vīts Rimkus	(Latvia) Ventspils	4
1	(Tajikistan) Ibrahim Rabimov	(Tajikistan) Regar-TadAZ Tursunzoda	4
4	(Kazakhstan) Murat Tleshev	(Kazakhstan) Aktobe	3
4	(Russia) Marat Khairullin	(Kazakhstan) Aktobe	3
4	(Brazil) Nicolas Ceolin	(Belarus) MTZ-RIPO Minsk	3
4	(Turkey) Hasan Kabze	(Russia) Rubin Kazan	3
