= 2009 UEFA European Under-21 Championship squads =

Football team member listings

Only players born on or after 1 January 1986 were eligible to play. Players in bold have made their senior international debuts prior to the competition or afterwards.

== Group A ==
=== Belarus ===
Head coach: Yuri Kurnenin

No.	Pos.	Player	Date of birth (age)	Caps	Club
1	GK	Pavel Chasnowski	4 March 1986 (aged 23)		(Belarus) Vitebsk
2	DF	**Mikalay Asipovich**	29 May 1986 (aged 23)		(Belarus) MTZ-RIPO Minsk
3	DF	**Alyaksandr Martynovich**	26 August 1987 (aged 21)		(Belarus) Dinamo Minsk
4	DF	**Igor Shitov**	24 October 1986 (aged 22)		(Belarus) BATE Borisov
5	MF	**Maksim Bardachow**	18 May 1986 (aged 23)		(Belarus) BATE Borisov
6	MF	**Syarhey Balanovich**	29 August 1987 (aged 21)		(Belarus) Shakhtyor Soligorsk
7	MF	**Sergey Krivets**	8 June 1986 (aged 23)		(Belarus) BATE Borisov
8	DF	**Alyaksandr Valadzko**	18 June 1986 (aged 22)		(Belarus) BATE Borisov
9	FW	**Leanid Kovel**	29 July 1986 (aged 22)		(Russia) Saturn Moscow Oblast
10	FW	**Dzmitry Kamarowski**	10 October 1986 (aged 22)		(Belarus) Naftan Novopolotsk
11	MF	Mikhail Afanasyev (c)	4 November 1986 (aged 22)		(Russia) Amkar Perm
12	GK	Artem Gomelko	8 December 1989 (aged 19)		(Russia) Lokomotiv Moscow
13	MF	**Alyaksandr Sachywka**	5 January 1986 (aged 23)		(Belarus) Minsk
14	MF	**Anton Putsila**	10 June 1987 (aged 22)		(Belarus) Dinamo Minsk
15	DF	**Syarhey Kislyak**	6 August 1987 (aged 21)		(Belarus) Dinamo Minsk
16	DF	**Aleh Veratsila**	10 July 1988 (aged 20)		(Belarus) Dinamo Minsk
17	MF	Syarhey Hihevich	26 January 1987 (aged 22)		(Belarus) Dinamo Minsk
18	DF	**Dzmitry Verkhawtsow**	10 October 1986 (aged 22)		(Belarus) Naftan Novopolotsk
19	DF	**Alyaksey Yanushkevich**	15 January 1986 (aged 23)		(Belarus) Shakhtyor Soligorsk
20	FW	Vladimir Yurchenko	26 January 1989 (aged 20)		(Russia) Saturn Moscow Oblast
21	MF	**Mikhail Sivakov**	16 January 1988 (aged 21)		(Italy) Cagliari
22	GK	Anton Kavalewski	2 February 1986 (aged 23)		(Belarus) Naftan Novopolotsk
23	DF	**Andrey Chukhley**	2 October 1987 (aged 21)		(Belarus) Dinamo Minsk

=== Italy ===
Head coach: Pierluigi Casiraghi

No.	Pos.	Player	Date of birth (age)	Caps	Club
1	GK	Andrea Consigli	27 January 1987 (aged 22)		(Italy) Atalanta
2	DF	**Marco Motta** (c)	14 May 1986 (aged 23)		(Italy) Udinese
3	DF	Marco Andreolli	10 June 1986 (aged 23)		(Italy) Roma
4	DF	**Domenico Criscito**	30 December 1986 (aged 22)		(Italy) Juventus
5	MF	Piermario Morosini	5 July 1986 (aged 22)		(Italy) Vicenza
6	DF	Lino Marzoratti	12 October 1986 (aged 22)		(Italy) Empoli
7	MF	**Ignazio Abate**	12 November 1986 (aged 22)		(Italy) Torino
8	MF	**Claudio Marchisio**	19 January 1986 (aged 23)		(Italy) Juventus
9	FW	Robert Acquafresca	11 September 1987 (aged 21)		(Italy) Internazionale
10	FW	**Sebastian Giovinco**	26 January 1987 (aged 22)		(Italy) Juventus
11	DF	Paolo De Ceglie	17 September 1986 (aged 22)		(Italy) Juventus
12	GK	**Salvatore Sirigu**	12 January 1987 (aged 22)		(Italy) Palermo
13	DF	**Andrea Ranocchia**	16 February 1988 (aged 21)		(Italy) Genoa
14	DF	Francesco Pisano	29 April 1986 (aged 23)		(Italy) Cagliari
15	DF	**Salvatore Bocchetti**	30 November 1986 (aged 22)		(Italy) Genoa
16	MF	**Antonio Candreva**	28 February 1987 (aged 22)		(Italy) Udinese
17	MF	**Andrea Poli**	29 September 1989 (aged 19)		(Italy) Sampdoria
18	MF	**Alessio Cerci**	23 July 1987 (aged 21)		(Italy) Roma
19	FW	Alberto Paloschi	4 January 1990 (aged 19)		(Italy) Parma
20	FW	**Mario Balotelli**	12 August 1990 (aged 18)		(Italy) Internazionale
21	MF	Luca Cigarini	20 June 1986 (aged 22)		(Italy) Atalanta
22	GK	Andrea Seculin	14 July 1990 (aged 18)		(Italy) Fiorentina
23	MF	Daniele Dessena	10 May 1987 (aged 22)		(Italy) Sampdoria

=== Serbia ===
Head coach: Slobodan Krčmarević

No.	Pos.	Player	Date of birth (age)	Caps	Club
1	GK	**Željko Brkić**	9 July 1986 (aged 22)		(Serbia) Vojvodina
2	DF	Marko Jovanović	23 March 1988 (aged 21)		(Serbia) Partizan
3	DF	**Ljubomir Fejsa**	14 August 1988 (aged 20)		(Serbia) Partizan
4	MF	**Gojko Kačar**	26 January 1987 (aged 22)		(Germany) Hertha BSC
5	DF	Nikola Petković	28 March 1986 (aged 23)		(Germany) Eintracht Frankfurt
6	DF	Nikola Gulan	23 March 1989 (aged 20)		(Italy) Fiorentina
7	MF	**Milan Smiljanić** (c)	19 November 1986 (aged 22)		(Spain) Espanyol
8	FW	Rade Veljović	9 August 1986 (aged 22)		(Romania) CFR Cluj
9	FW	Slavko Perović	9 June 1989 (aged 20)		(Serbia) Red Star Belgrade
10	FW	**Miralem Sulejmani**	5 December 1988 (aged 20)		(Netherlands) Ajax
11	MF	**Zoran Tošić**	28 April 1987 (aged 22)		(England) Manchester United
12	GK	**Bojan Šaranov**	22 September 1987 (aged 21)		(Serbia) OFK Beograd
13	DF	**Ivan Obradović**	25 July 1988 (aged 20)		(Serbia) Partizan
14	DF	**Nenad Tomović**	30 August 1987 (aged 21)		(Serbia) Red Star Belgrade
15	DF	**Nemanja Pejčinović**	4 November 1987 (aged 21)		(Serbia) Red Star Belgrade
16	DF	**Jagoš Vuković**	10 June 1988 (aged 21)		(Serbia) Rad
17	MF	**Nemanja Matić**	1 August 1988 (aged 20)		(Slovakia) MFK Košice
18	MF	**Marko Milinković**	16 April 1988 (aged 21)		(Slovakia) MFK Košice
19	DF	Rajko Brežančić	21 August 1989 (aged 19)		(Serbia) Partizan
20	FW	**Dušan Tadić**	20 November 1988 (aged 20)		(Serbia) Vojvodina
21	DF	**Milan Vilotić**	21 October 1986 (aged 22)		(Serbia) Čukarički
22	FW	**Nemanja Tomić**	21 January 1988 (aged 21)		(Serbia) Partizan
23	GK	Živko Živković	14 April 1989 (aged 20)		(Serbia) Metalac Gornji Milanovac

=== Sweden ===
Head coach: Tommy Söderberg and Jörgen Lennartsson

No.	Pos.	Player	Date of birth (age)	Caps	Club
1	GK	**Johan Dahlin**	8 September 1986 (aged 22)		(Norway) Lyn
2	DF	**Mikael Lustig**	13 December 1986 (aged 22)		(Norway) Rosenborg
3	DF	**Mattias Bjärsmyr** (c)	3 January 1986 (aged 23)		(Sweden) IFK Göteborg
4	DF	**Rasmus Bengtsson**	26 June 1986 (aged 22)		(Sweden) Trelleborgs FF
5	DF	**Emil Johansson**	11 August 1986 (aged 22)		(Sweden) Hammarby IF
6	DF	**Per Karlsson**	2 January 1986 (aged 23)		(Sweden) AIK
7	FW	**Ola Toivonen**	3 July 1986 (aged 22)		(Netherlands) PSV
8	MF	**Andreas Landgren**	17 March 1989 (aged 20)		(Sweden) Helsingborgs IF
9	FW	**Marcus Berg**	17 August 1986 (aged 22)		(Netherlands) Groningen
10	FW	**Denni Avdić**	5 September 1988 (aged 20)		(Sweden) IF Elfsborg
11	FW	**Robin Söder**	1 April 1991 (aged 18)		(Sweden) IFK Göteborg
12	GK	**Pär Hansson**	22 June 1986 (aged 22)		(Sweden) Helsingborgs IF
13	MF	**Gustav Svensson**	7 February 1987 (aged 22)		(Sweden) IFK Göteborg
14	MF	**Guillermo Molins**	26 September 1988 (aged 20)		(Sweden) Malmö FF
15	MF	Labinot Harbuzi	4 April 1986 (aged 23)		(Sweden) Malmö FF
16	DF	**Pierre Bengtsson**	12 April 1988 (aged 21)		(Sweden) AIK
17	DF	**Martin Olsson**	17 May 1988 (aged 21)		(England) Blackburn Rovers
18	MF	**Rasmus Elm**	17 March 1988 (aged 21)		(Sweden) Kalmar FF
19	MF	**Pontus Wernbloom**	25 June 1986 (aged 22)		(Sweden) IFK Göteborg
20	MF	**Emir Bajrami**	7 March 1988 (aged 21)		(Sweden) IF Elfsborg
21	MF	Gabriel Özkan	23 May 1986 (aged 23)		(Sweden) AIK
22	DF	**Joel Ekstrand**	4 February 1989 (aged 20)		(Sweden) Helsingborgs IF
23	GK	**Kristoffer Nordfeldt**	23 June 1989 (aged 19)		(Sweden) IF Brommapojkarna

== Group B ==
=== England ===
Head coach: Stuart Pearce

No.	Pos.	Player	Date of birth (age)	Caps	Goals	Club
1	GK	**Joe Hart**	19 April 1987 (aged 22)	18	0	(The Football Association) Manchester City
2	DF	Martin Cranie	23 September 1986 (aged 22)	12	0	(The Football Association) Portsmouth
3	DF	Andrew Taylor	1 August 1986 (aged 22)	12	0	(The Football Association) Middlesbrough
4	MF	Lee Cattermole	21 March 1988 (aged 21)	10	1	(The Football Association) Wigan Athletic
5	DF	Richard Stearman	19 August 1987 (aged 21)	3	0	(The Football Association) Wolverhampton Wanderers
6	DF	Nedum Onuoha	12 November 1986 (aged 22)	18	1	(The Football Association) Manchester City
7	MF	**James Milner**	4 January 1986 (aged 23)	42	8	(The Football Association) Aston Villa
8	MF	Craig Gardner	27 November 1986 (aged 22)	11	2	(The Football Association) Aston Villa
9	FW	**Gabriel Agbonlahor**	13 October 1986 (aged 22)	13	5	(The Football Association) Aston Villa
10	MF	Mark Noble (c)	8 May 1987 (aged 22)	16	3	(The Football Association) West Ham United
11	MF	**Adam Johnson**	14 July 1987 (aged 21)	15	4	(The Football Association) Middlesbrough
12	MF	Fabrice Muamba	6 April 1988 (aged 21)	15	0	(The Football Association) Bolton Wanderers
13	GK	Joe Lewis	6 October 1987 (aged 21)	4	0	(The Football Association) Peterborough United
14	FW	**Theo Walcott**	16 March 1989 (aged 20)	15	6	(The Football Association) Arsenal
15	MF	**Jack Rodwell**	11 March 1991 (aged 18)	2	1	(The Football Association) Everton
16	DF	James Tomkins	29 March 1989 (aged 20)	1	0	(The Football Association) West Ham United
17	DF	**Micah Richards**	24 June 1988 (aged 20)	5	1	(The Football Association) Manchester City
18	DF	**Michael Mancienne**	8 January 1988 (aged 21)	12	1	(The Football Association) Chelsea
19	DF	**Kieran Gibbs**	26 September 1989 (aged 19)	3	2	(The Football Association) Arsenal
20	MF	Andrew Driver	20 November 1987 (aged 21)	0	0	(Scottish Football Association) Heart of Midlothian
21	FW	**Fraizer Campbell**	13 September 1987 (aged 21)	10	3	(The Football Association) Manchester United
22	GK	Scott Loach	27 May 1988 (aged 21)	3	0	(The Football Association) Watford
23	MF	**Danny Rose**	2 July 1990 (aged 18)	1	0	(The Football Association) Tottenham Hotspur

Note: All information accurate at start of tournament, on 15 June 2009.

=== Finland ===
Head coach: Markku Kanerva

No.	Pos.	Player	Date of birth (age)	Caps	Club
1	GK	**Anssi Jaakkola**	13 March 1987 (aged 22)		(Italy) Siena
2	DF	**Ville Jalasto**	19 April 1986 (aged 23)		(Norway) Aalesund
3	DF	**Jukka Raitala**	15 September 1988 (aged 20)		(Finland) HJK Helsinki
4	DF	Jonas Portin	30 September 1986 (aged 22)		(Finland) Jaro
5	DF	**Tuomo Turunen**	30 August 1987 (aged 21)		(Finland) Honka
6	MF	**Tim Sparv** (c)	20 February 1987 (aged 22)		(Sweden) Halmstad
7	MF	**Kasper Hämäläinen**	8 August 1986 (aged 22)		(Finland) TPS
8	MF	**Mehmet Hetemaj**	8 December 1987 (aged 21)		(Greece) Panionios
9	FW	**Berat Sadik**	14 September 1986 (aged 22)		(Germany) Arminia Bielefeld
10	MF	Nicholas Otaru	15 July 1986 (aged 22)		(Finland) Honka
11	FW	**Jarno Parikka**	21 July 1986 (aged 22)		(Finland) HJK Helsinki
12	GK	Jon Masalin	29 January 1986 (aged 23)		(Norway) Hamarkameratene
13	DF	Pyry Kärkkäinen	10 November 1986 (aged 22)		(Finland) HJK Helsinki
14	DF	**Joni Aho**	12 April 1986 (aged 23)		(Finland) Inter Turku
15	MF	Ilari Äijälä	30 September 1986 (aged 22)		(Finland) MyPa-47
16	MF	**Përparim Hetemaj**	12 December 1986 (aged 22)		(Greece) AEK Athens
17	MF	Juha Hakola	27 October 1987 (aged 21)		(Netherlands) Heracles Almelo
18	MF	Jussi Vasara	14 May 1987 (aged 22)		(Finland) Honka
19	FW	Aleksandr Kokko	6 April 1987 (aged 22)		(Finland) Honka
20	FW	**Teemu Pukki**	29 March 1990 (aged 19)		(Spain) Sevilla
21	DF	Petri Viljanen	3 February 1987 (aged 22)		(Finland) Haka
22	DF	Joona Toivio	4 April 1988 (aged 21)		(Netherlands) AZ
23	GK	Jukka Lehtovaara	15 March 1988 (aged 21)		(Finland) TPS

=== Germany ===
Head coach: Horst Hrubesch

No.	Pos.	Player	Date of birth (age)	Caps	Club
1	GK	**Manuel Neuer**	27 March 1986 (aged 23)	15	(Germany) Schalke 04
2	DF	**Andreas Beck**	13 March 1987 (aged 22)	22	(Germany) 1899 Hoffenheim
3	DF	**Sebastian Boenisch**	1 February 1987 (aged 22)	10	(Germany) Werder Bremen
4	DF	**Benedikt Höwedes**	29 February 1988 (aged 21)	11	(Germany) Schalke 04
5	DF	**Jérôme Boateng**	3 November 1988 (aged 20)	8	(Germany) Hamburger SV
6	DF	**Dennis Aogo**	14 January 1987 (aged 22)	20	(Germany) Hamburger SV
7	MF	Patrick Ebert	17 March 1987 (aged 22)	10	(Germany) Hertha BSC
8	MF	**Sami Khedira** (c)	4 April 1987 (aged 22)	11	(Germany) VfB Stuttgart
9	MF	**Ashkan Dejagah**	5 July 1986 (aged 22)	16	(Germany) VfL Wolfsburg
10	MF	**Mesut Özil**	15 October 1988 (aged 20)	11	(Germany) Werder Bremen
11	MF	**Marko Marin**	13 March 1989 (aged 20)	7	(Germany) Borussia Mönchengladbach
12	GK	Florian Fromlowitz	2 July 1986 (aged 22)	12	(Germany) Hannover 96
13	FW	**Sandro Wagner**	29 November 1987 (aged 21)	5	(Germany) MSV Duisburg
14	MF	**Fabian Johnson**	11 December 1987 (aged 21)	4	(Germany) 1860 Munich
15	DF	**Mats Hummels**	16 December 1988 (aged 20)	10	(Germany) Borussia Dortmund
16	DF	Daniel Schwaab	23 August 1988 (aged 20)	14	(Germany) SC Freiburg
17	MF	Dennis Grote	9 August 1986 (aged 22)	14	(Germany) VfL Bochum
18	MF	Daniel Adlung	1 October 1987 (aged 21)	5	(Germany) VfL Wolfsburg
19	MF	**Änis Ben-Hatira**	18 July 1988 (aged 20)	3	(Germany) MSV Duisburg
20	MF	**Gonzalo Castro**	11 June 1987 (aged 22)	16	(Germany) Bayer Leverkusen
21	DF	**Marcel Schmelzer**	22 January 1988 (aged 21)	1	(Germany) Borussia Dortmund
22	FW	Chinedu Ede	5 February 1987 (aged 22)	5	(Germany) MSV Duisburg
23	GK	Tobias Sippel	22 March 1988 (aged 21)	1	(Germany) 1. FC Kaiserslautern

=== Spain ===
Head coach: Juan Ramón López Caro

No.	Pos.	Player	Date of birth (age)	Caps	Goals	Club
1	GK	Roberto Jiménez	10 February 1986 (aged 23)	6	0	(Royal Spanish Football Federation) Recreativo Huelva
2	DF	Miguel Torres	28 January 1986 (aged 23)	12	0	(Royal Spanish Football Federation) Real Madrid
3	DF	**Nacho Monreal**	26 February 1986 (aged 23)	6	0	(Royal Spanish Football Federation) Osasuna
4	MF	**Javi García**	8 February 1987 (aged 22)	8	0	(Royal Spanish Football Federation) Real Madrid
5	DF	Marc Torrejón	18 February 1986 (aged 23)	8	0	(Royal Spanish Football Federation) Espanyol
6	MF	**Javi Martínez**	2 September 1988 (aged 20)	7	0	(Royal Spanish Football Federation) Athletic Bilbao
7	MF	Sisi	22 April 1986 (aged 23)	10	2	(Royal Spanish Football Federation) Recreativo Huelva
8	MF	**Raúl García** (c)	11 July 1986 (aged 22)	17	1	(Royal Spanish Football Federation) Atlético Madrid
9	FW	**Bojan Krkić**	28 August 1990 (aged 18)	8	3	(Royal Spanish Football Federation) Barcelona
10	MF	José Manuel Jurado	29 June 1986 (aged 22)	15	5	(Royal Spanish Football Federation) Mallorca
11	MF	Esteban Granero	2 July 1987 (aged 21)	8	2	(Royal Spanish Football Federation) Getafe
12	DF	**César Azpilicueta**	28 August 1989 (aged 19)	5	0	(Royal Spanish Football Federation) Osasuna
13	GK	**Sergio Asenjo**	28 June 1989 (aged 19)	7	0	(Royal Spanish Football Federation) Real Valladolid
14	DF	Sergio Sánchez	3 April 1986 (aged 23)	3	0	(Royal Spanish Football Federation) Espanyol
15	DF	Chico Flores	6 March 1987 (aged 22)	2	0	(Royal Spanish Football Federation) Almería
16	DF	Iván Marcano	23 June 1987 (aged 21)	0	0	(Royal Spanish Football Federation) Racing Santander
17	MF	**Diego Capel**	16 February 1988 (aged 21)	7	2	(Royal Spanish Football Federation) Sevilla
18	MF	**Mario Suárez**	24 February 1987 (aged 22)	3	0	(Royal Spanish Football Federation) Mallorca
19	FW	Xisco	26 June 1986 (aged 22)	8	3	(The Football Association) Newcastle United
20	FW	Jonathan Pereira	12 May 1987 (aged 22)	2	0	(Royal Spanish Football Federation) Racing Santander
21	FW	**Adrián López**	8 January 1988 (aged 21)	3	1	(Royal Spanish Football Federation) Málaga
22	MF	Pedro León	24 November 1986 (aged 22)	3	0	(Royal Spanish Football Federation) Real Valladolid
23	GK	Antonio Adán	13 May 1987 (aged 22)	1	0	(Royal Spanish Football Federation) Real Madrid Castilla
