= Deimantas =

- Gender: Male
- Language: Lithuanian

Origin
- Region of origin: Lithuania

Other names
- Related names: Deimantė (feminine form)

Deimantas is a Lithuanian masculine given name. The feminine form of the Deimantas is Deimantė. People bearing the name Deimantas include:

- Deimantas Bička (born 1972), Lithuanian footballer
- Deimantas Narkevičius (born 1964), Lithuanian sculptor and artist
- Deimantas Petravičius (born 1995), Lithuanian footballer
