= Aleksandr Yatskevich =

Aleksandr Yatskevich is the name of:

- Aleksandrs Jackevičs (born 1958), Soviet Latvian judoka
- Alyaksandr Yatskevich (born 1985), Belarusian footballer
