= Talkanitsa =

Talkanitsa is a surname. People associated with this surname include:

- Alyaksandr Talkanitsa
- Hanna Talkanitsa
