= Alyaksandr Skshynetski =

Belarusian footballer

Personal information
- Date of birth: 28 February 1990 (age 36)
- Place of birth: Korelichi, Grodno Oblast, Belarusian SSR
- Height: 1.75 m (5 ft 9 in)
- Position: Defender

Youth career
- 2007–2008: MTZ-RIPO Minsk

Senior career*
Years	Team	Apps	(Gls)
2008–2011	Partizan Minsk	10	(0)
2011	→ Partizan-2 Minsk	9	(1)
2012	Smorgon	21	(0)
2013	Isloch Minsk Raion	28	(0)
2014–2017	Krumkachy Minsk	109	(2)
2018	Smolevichi	29	(0)
2019	NFK Minsk	25	(1)
2020–2025	Arsenal Dzerzhinsk	152	(4)

International career
2010–2011	Belarus U21	10	(0)
- * Club domestic league appearances and goals as of 1 December 2025

Alyaksandr Skshynetski (Belarusian: Аляксандр Скшынецкі; Russian: Александр Скшинецкий; born 28 February 1990) is a Belarusian former professional footballer who last played for Arsenal Dzerzhinsk.

== Honours ==
MTZ-RIPO Minsk

- Belarusian Cup winner: 2007–08
