= Anton Bubnow =

Belarusian professional footballer

Personal information
- Date of birth: 23 November 1988 (age 37)
- Place of birth: Slonim, Belarusian SSR
- Height: 1.88 m (6 ft 2 in)
- Position: Midfielder

Youth career
- 2004–2006: MTZ-RIPO Minsk

Senior career*
Years	Team	Apps	(Gls)
2007–2011	Partizan Minsk	80	(6)
2012–2014	Gorodeya	50	(9)
2014–2018	Isloch Minsk Raion	70	(9)
2019	Belshina Bobruisk	7	(0)
2021	Molodechno	6	(3)

International career
2005	Belarus U17	2	(0)
2008–2009	Belarus U21	5	(0)
- * Club domestic league appearances and goals as of 31 December 2021

Anton Bubnow (Belarusian: Антон Бубноў; Russian: Антон Бубнов; born 23 November 1988) is a Belarusian professional footballer.

== Career ==
Born in Slonim, Bubnow began playing football in FC MTZ-RIPO's youth system. He joined the senior side (now known as FC Partizan Minsk) and made his Belarusian Premier League debut in 2007.

Bubnow played for Belarus at the 2005 UEFA European Under-17 Championship.

== Honours ==
MTZ-RIPO Minsk

- Belarusian Cup winner: 2007–08
