= Dzmitry Hintaw =

Belarusian footballer

Personal information
- Date of birth: 14 September 1984 (age 42)
- Place of birth: Grodno, Byelorussian SSR, Soviet Union
- Height: 1.85 m (6 ft 1 in)
- Position: Defender

Youth career
- 2001–2002: Neman Grodno

Senior career*
Years	Team	Apps	(Gls)
2002–2005	Neman Grodno	58	(2)
2006–2007	Darida Minsk Raion	31	(1)
2008	Granit Mikashevichi	24	(4)
2009	Naftan Novopolotsk	10	(0)
2010	Torpedo Zhodino	9	(0)
2011	Vedrich-97 Rechitsa	27	(0)
2012	Gorodeya	9	(0)
2012	Vedrich-97 Rechitsa	8	(0)
2013	Smorgon	21	(0)
2014	Rechitsa-2014	19	(2)
- * Club domestic league appearances and goals as of 4 December 2014

Dzmitry Hintaw (Belarusian: Дзмітрый Гінтаў; Russian: Дмитрий Гинтов; born 14 September 1984) is a Belarusian former professional footballer.

== Honours ==
Naftan Novopolotsk

- Belarusian Cup winner: 2008–09

== Career ==
Born in Grodno, Hintaw began playing football in Neman Grodno's youth system. He joined the senior team and made his Belarusian Premier League debut in 2002. He would later play in the Premier League with Darida Minsk Raion, Granit Mikashevichi, Naftan Novopolotsk and Torpedo Zhodino.
