= Alyaksey Belavusaw =

Belarusian footballer

Personal information
- Date of birth: 26 April 1976 (age 50)
- Height: 1.79 m (5 ft 10 1/2 in)
- Position: Defender

Senior career*
Years	Team	Apps	(Gls)
1994–1998	Dinamo-Juni Minsk	79	(2)
1998–2002	Dinamo Minsk	96	(5)
2002–2005	Shakhtyor Soligorsk	74	(10)
2006–2009	Naftan Novopolotsk	97	(6)
2010	Belshina Bobruisk	22	(1)
2011	Vitebsk	27	(1)
2012	SKVICH Minsk	14	(0)
2014	Torpedo Minsk	2	(0)
- * Club domestic league appearances and goals as of 1 January 2015

Alyaksey Belavusaw (Belarusian: Аляксей Белавусаў; Russian: Алексей Белоусов; born 26 April 1976) is a retired Belarusian professional footballer. His latest club was Torpedo Minsk.

== Honours ==
Naftan Novopolotsk

- Belarusian Cup winner: 2008–09
