= Valery Bakhno =

Belarusian footballer and manager

Personal information
- Date of birth: 26 June 1971 (age 55)
- Place of birth: Mikashevichi, Belarusian SSR
- Position: Midfielder

Team information
- Current team: Granit Mikashevichi (head coach)

Senior career*
Years	Team	Apps	(Gls)
1994	Samotlor-XXI Nizhnevartovsk	19	(0)
1994	Shakhtyor Soligorsk	4	(0)
1995	Granit Mikashevichi	2	(0)
1996	Shakhtyor Soligorsk	13	(0)
1996	Granit Mikashevichi		
1997	Shakhtyor Soligorsk	3	(0)
1997–2000	Granit Mikashevichi	45	(10)
2000	Žalgiris Vilnius	2	(0)
2001	Hetman Zamosc	4	(0)
2003–2006	Granit Mikashevichi	102	(0)

Managerial career
- 1997–2000: Granit Mikashevichi
- 2003–2018: Granit Mikashevichi
- 2019: Granit Mikashevichi
- * Club domestic league appearances and goals

Valery Bakhno (Belarusian: Валерый Бахно; Russian: Валерий Бохно; born 26 June 1971) is a retired Belarusian professional footballer. As of 2015, he is a head coach in Granit Mikashevichi, his hometown club in which he spent the majority of his playing and coaching career. His younger brother Andrey Bakhno is also a former footballer and currently a director in Granit Mikashevichi.
