= Valeri Pavlov =

Russian footballer

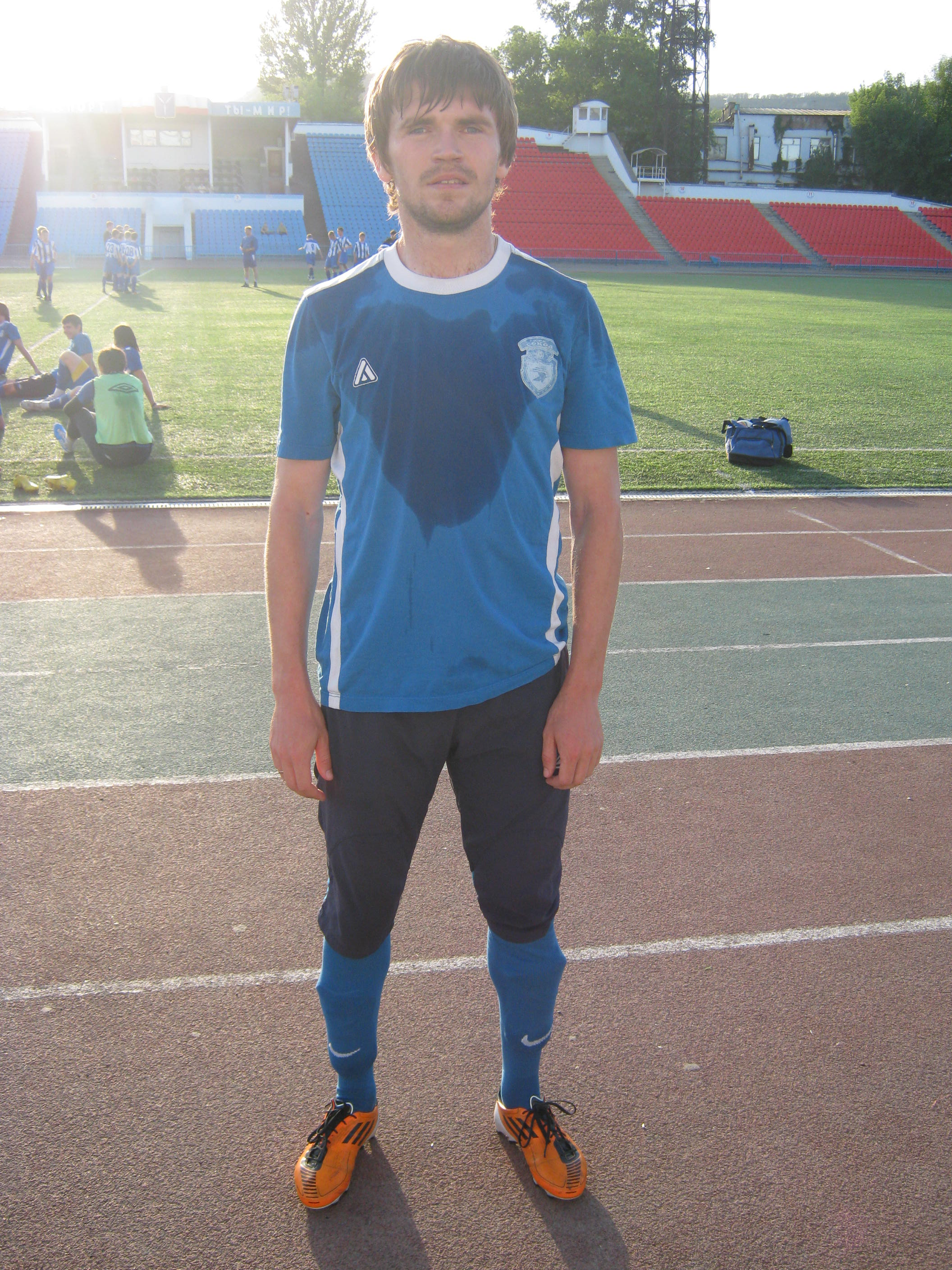

Personal information
- Full name: Valeri Anatolyevich Pavlov
- Date of birth: 7 February 1986 (age 40)
- Place of birth: Syzran, Samara Oblast, Russian SFSR
- Height: 1.75 m (5 ft 9 in)
- Position: Midfielder

Youth career
- 2002–2003: Sokol Saratov

Senior career*
Years	Team	Apps	(Gls)
2002	Sokol Saratov	0	(0)
2003	Iskra Engels	0	(0)
2004–2005	Sokol Saratov	45	(3)
2006	Nosta Novotroitsk	8	(0)
2006	Rostov	0	(0)
2007	Sodovik Sterlitamak	29	(2)
2008–2010	Sokol Saratov	47	(2)
2010	Neman Grodno	12	(1)
2011–2013	Sokol Saratov	34	(1)
2013	Kaluga	4	(0)
2013	Metallurg-Oskol Stary Oskol	12	(0)
2014	Syzran-2003	8	(1)
2014–2015	Lada Togliatti	35	(1)
2016	DSI Komsomolsk-na-Amure		
2016	Rubin Yalta	10	(1)
2017	Ocean Kerch		
2017	Smena Komsomolsk-na-Amure	8	(0)
2018–2022	Sokol Saratov	60	(1)
- * Club domestic league appearances and goals

Valeri Anatolyevich Pavlov (Russian: Валерий Анатольевич Павлов; born 7 February 1986) is a Russian former professional football player.

== Club career ==
He made his Russian Football National League debut for FC Sokol Saratov on 6 May 2004 in a game against FC Lokomotiv Chita.
