= Oleg Strakhanovich =

Belarusian footballer (born 1979)

Personal information
- Date of birth: 13 October 1979 (age 47)
- Place of birth: Pinsk, Brest Oblast, Byelorussian SSR, Soviet Union
- Height: 1.83 m (6 ft 0 in)
- Position: Midfielder

Youth career
- SDYuShOR-3 Pinsk

Senior career*
Years	Team	Apps	(Gls)
1996–1997	Pinsk-900	15	(1)
1998–2001	Dinamo Brest	103	(19)
2002–2004	BATE Borisov	71	(23)
2005	Tobol Kostanay	10	(1)
2005–2008	MTZ-RIPO Minsk	75	(25)
2007	→ FBK Kaunas (loan)	17	(1)
2009–2010	Dinamo Minsk	61	(8)
2011	Neman Grodno	29	(4)
2012	Slavia Mozyr	24	(3)
2013	Smolevichi-STI	23	(7)
2014–2017	Slavia Mozyr	98	(13)
2018–2019	Molodechno	40	(4)
2020	Ostrovets	8	(0)
2020–	Kronon Stolbtsy	7	(1)

International career^{‡}
2001	Belarus U21	2	(1)
2004	Belarus Olympic	3	(0)
2001–2008	Belarus	15	(0)
- * Club domestic league appearances and goals as of 31 December 2020 ‡ National team caps and goals as of 1 December 2009

Oleg Strakhanovich (Belarusian: Алег Страхановiч, Aleh Strakhanovich, Russian: Олег Страханович; born 13 October 1979) is a Belarusian former footballer.

== Football career ==
Strakhanovich started his career at Pinsk-900. At the start of 1998 season he move to top division's Dinamo Brest. In 2002, he moved to BATE Borisov. After a short spell at Kazakhstani club Tobol Kostanay, he moved to MTZ-RIPO Minsk in summer 2005.

At the start of 2007 season he was loaned to FBK Kaunas, a sister club owned by Vladimir Romanov, but in the summer of 2007 he returned to MTZ.

== Honors and awards ==
BATE Borisov

- Belarusian Premier League champion: 2002

FBK Kaunas

- A Lyga champion: 2007

MTZ-RIPO Minsk

- Belarusian Cup winner: 2007–08
