= Deimantė =

- Gender: Female
- Language: Lithuanian
- Name day: 12 February

Origin
- Region of origin: Lithuania

Other names
- Related names: Deimantas (masculine form)

Deimantė is a Lithuanian feminine given name. The masculine form of Deimantė is Deimantas. People bearing the name Deimantė include:

- Deimantė Cornette (born 1989), Lithuanian chess player
