= Oleksandr Papush =

Ukrainian footballer

Personal information
- Full name: Oleksandr Serhiyovych Papush
- Date of birth: 14 January 1985 (age 41)
- Place of birth: Mariupol, Ukrainian SSR
- Height: 1.76 m (5 ft 9 1/2 in)
- Position: Defender

Youth career
- 2000–2002: Metalurh Mariupol

Senior career*
| Years | Team | Apps | (Gls) |
| 2001–2007 | Illichivets Mariupol | 3 | (0) |
| 2001–2006 | → Illichivets-2 Mariupol | 84 | (4) |
| 2008 | Lokomotiv Minsk | 26 | (2) |
| 2009–2010 | Dinamo Brest | 34 | (2) |
| 2010–2011 | Torpedo-BelAZ Zhodino | 44 | (2) |
| 2012 | Dinamo Brest | 25 | (1) |
| 2013 | Kaisar | 12 | (2) |
| 2013 | Vedrich-97 Rechitsa | 13 | (2) |
| 2014 | Zhemchuzhina Yalta | 9 | (0) |
| 2015–2020 | Isloch Minsk Raion | 114 | (5) |
- * Club domestic league appearances and goals as of 31 December 2020

Oleksandr Papush (Ukrainian: Олександр Сергійович Папуш; born 14 January 1985) is a Ukrainian former professional footballer.

== Career ==
In March 2017, Papush was one of several Isloch Minsk Raion players alleged to be involved in match fixing.

On 20 February 2018, the BFF banned Papush for 24 months for his involvement in the match fixing. In April 2019 the remainder of his term has been replaced with probation and he resumed playing for Isloch soon thereafter.
