= Yawhen Zuew =

Belarusian footballer

Personal information
- Date of birth: 2 March 1983 (age 43)
- Place of birth: Minsk, Belarusian SSR
- Height: 1.90 m (6 ft 3 in)
- Position: Forward

Youth career
- 2001: SKAF Minsk

Senior career*
| Years | Team | Apps | (Gls) |
| 2001 | SKAF Minsk | 4 | (0) |
| 2001–2002 | Lokomotiv Minsk | 21 | (6) |
| 2003–2006 | Torpedo Zhodino | 84 | (27) |
| 2007–2008 | Vitebsk | 37 | (6) |
| 2009–2010 | Naftan Novopolotsk | 35 | (7) |
| 2011 | Gomel | 25 | (4) |
| 2012 | Slavia Mozyr | 11 | (1) |
| 2013 | Vitebsk | 17 | (4) |

International career
| 2004 | Belarus U21 | 3 | (0) |
- * Club domestic league appearances and goals

Yawhen Zuew (Belarusian: Яўген Зуеў; Russian: Евгений Зуев; born 2 March 1983) is a Belarusian former professional footballer. His latest club was Vitebsk.

== Honours ==
Naftan Novopolotsk

- Belarusian Cup winner: 2008–09

Gomel

- Belarusian Cup winner: 2010–11
