= Illya Rylinski =

Belarusian footballer

Personal information
- Date of birth: 16 February 1984 (age 42)
- Height: 1.79 m (5 ft 10 1/2 in)
- Position: Midfielder

Youth career
- 2000–2003: RUOR Minsk

Senior career*
Years	Team	Apps	(Gls)
2000–2003	RUOR Minsk	94	(13)
2004	Dinamo-Juni Minsk	30	(5)
2005	Smena Minsk	5	(0)
2005–2007	Veras Nesvizh	62	(12)
2008	Darida Minsk Raion	16	(0)
2008–2009	Gomel	29	(0)
2010	Volna Pinsk	14	(0)
2010	Smorgon	3	(0)
- * Club domestic league appearances and goals

Illya Rylinski (Belarusian: Ілля Рылінскі; Russian: Илья Рылинский; born 16 February 1984) is a retired Belarusian professional footballer.
