= Hovhannes Goharyan =

Armenian footballer and manager

Personal information
- Full name: Hovhannes Gevush Goharyan
- Date of birth: 18 March 1988 (age 38)
- Place of birth: Gavar, Armenian SSR, Soviet Union
- Height: 1.73 m (5 ft 8 in)
- Position: Striker

Youth career
- 2004–2006: Dynamo Moscow

Senior career*
Years	Team	Apps	(Gls)
2007–2008	Lokomotiv Moscow	0	(0)
2009–2010	BATE Borisov	22	(3)
2010	→ Pyunik Yerevan (loan)	14	(7)
2011	Impuls Dilijan	9	(4)
2011–2012	Lokomotiv-2 Moscow	11	(5)
2014–2015	Ulisses	22	(10)

International career^{‡}
2004–2005	Russia U-17	4	(0)
2008–2010	Armenia U-21	6	(1)
2009–2010	Armenia	6	(1)
- * Club domestic league appearances and goals as of 28 May 2015 ‡ National team caps and goals as of 12 October 2010

Hovhannes Goharyan (Armenian: Հովհաննես Գոհարյան; born 18 March 1988) is a retired Armenian footballer and currently a manager. He last played for the Armenian Premier League club Ulisses FC in 2015.

== Career ==
Goharyan's senior club career grew from Lokomotiv Moscow (2007–2008), Bate Borisov(2009–2010), F.C Pyunik(2010-2010), Impuls Dilijan(2011-2011) to Ulysses Yerevan(2014–2017).

Goharyan made his international debut for Armenia against Moldova on 12 August 2009, and scored his first international goal against Belgium on 9 September 2009.

In 2017, he became the technical director of the Russian 4th-division club FC Nika Moscow.

== Honours ==
BATE Borisov

- Belarusian Premier League: 1

2009

- Belarusian Supercup: 1

2009

Pyunik Yerevan

- Armenian Premier League: 1

2010

== International goals ==
Hovhannes Goharyan: International goals
No.	Date	Venue	Opponent	Score	Result	Competition
1	2009-9-09	Hanrapetakan Stadium, Yerevan, Armenia	Belgium	1 – 0	2–1	2010 World Cup qualification
