= Dzmitry Kowb =

Belarusian footballer

Personal information
- Date of birth: 20 January 1987 (age 39)
- Place of birth: Minsk, Belarusian SSR
- Height: 1.83 m (6 ft 0 in)
- Position: Forward

Team information
- Current team: Dinamo Minsk (youth coach)

Youth career
- Dinamo Minsk
- 2005–2007: Shakhtyor Soligorsk

Senior career*
Years	Team	Apps	(Gls)
2008–2011	Belshina Bobruisk	53	(18)
2010	→ DSK Gomel (loan)	14	(6)
2012	Minsk	7	(0)
2012	Belshina Bobruisk	12	(2)
2013	Dnepr Mogilev	17	(2)
2014	Trakai	31	(11)
2015	Vitebsk	12	(3)
2015–2016	Gorodeya	19	(5)
2017	Narva Trans	14	(10)
2017	Minerva Punjab	0	(0)
2018	Baranovichi	9	(0)

Managerial career
- 2019–: Dinamo Minsk (youth)
- * Club domestic league appearances and goals

Dzmitry Kowb (Belarusian: Дзмiтры Коўб; Russian: Дмитрий Ковб; born 20 January 1987) is a Belarusian former professional footballer who last played for Baranovichi as a forward.

== Career ==
In 2014, while playing for FK Trakai in the A Lyga, he drew international media attention with his goal celebration, in which he celebrated scoring a late equalizer by running into the spectator stands and applauding for himself.

In 2017 he signed with I-League club Minerva Punjab, but eventually left the club without making an appearance.
