= Anatoly Bogovik =

Ukrainian footballer

Personal information
- Date of birth: 6 October 1947 (age 79)
- Place of birth: Dniprodzerzhynsk, Ukrainian SSR
- Position: Midfielder

Senior career*
Years	Team	Apps	(Gls)
1965–1966	Dneprovets Dniprodzerzhynsk	46	(10)
1967	Avtomobilist Zhitomir	16	(2)
1968–1971	Dynamo Kyiv	61	(5)
1972–1977	Dinamo Minsk	175	(18)
1978	Dnepr Mogilev	37	(6)

International career
1970	USSR Olympic	1	(0)

Managerial career
- 1979–1985: Dinamo Minsk (youth)
- 1985–1986: Yemen
- 1986: Shamsan Aden
- 1987–1988: Dinamo Minsk (assistant)
- 1989–1996: Dinamo Minsk (youth)
- 1997: Dinamo Minsk (assistant)
- 1998–2003: Dinamo Minsk (youth)
- 2003–2009: Shakhtyor Soligorsk (assistant)
- 2009: Shakhtyor Soligorsk (caretaker)
- 2012–2013: Belarus U21 (assistant)
- * Club domestic league appearances and goals

Anatoly Bogovik (Ukrainian: Анатолій Боговик; born 6 October 1947) is a Soviet and Ukrainian football manager and former player. He also spent a large part of his career in Belarus and currently holds Belarusian citizenship.

Bogovik spent the majority of his playing career playing for Dynamo Kyiv and Dinamo Minsk, helping the former to win the champions title in 1971.
