= Mikalay Asipovich =

Belarusian professional footballer

Personal information
- Date of birth: 29 May 1986 (age 40)
- Place of birth: Molodechno, Belarusian SSR
- Height: 1.82 m (5 ft 11 1/2 in)
- Position: Defender

Youth career
- 2001–2002: Molodechno-2000

Senior career*
Years	Team	Apps	(Gls)
2003–2009	MTZ-RIPO Minsk	83	(1)
2005	→ Dinaburg (loan)	5	(0)
2006	→ Neman Grodno (loan)	1	(0)
2010	Shakhtyor Soligorsk	11	(0)
2011	Minsk	17	(0)
2012–2014	Gorodeya	61	(2)
2015–2017	Uzda	25	(1)

International career^{‡}
2004–2009	Belarus U21	29	(1)
2008	Belarus	1	(0)
- * Club domestic league appearances and goals as of 31 December 2017 ‡ National team caps and goals as of 5 September 2010

Mikalay Asipovich (Belarusian: Мікалай Асіповіч; Russian: Николай Осипович; born 29 May 1986) is a Belarusian former professional footballer.

== Honours ==
MTZ-RIPO Minsk

- Belarusian Cup winner: 2007–08
