= Alyaksey Krawchanka =

Belarusian footballer

Personal information
- Date of birth: 15 January 1985 (age 41)
- Place of birth: Gomel, Belarusian SSR
- Height: 1.82 m (5 ft 11 1/2 in)
- Position: Midfielder

Youth career
- 2001–2004: Gomel

Senior career*
Years	Team	Apps	(Gls)
2004–2006	Gomel	29	(0)
2007–2008	Vedrich-97 Rechitsa	50	(6)
2009–2010	DSK Gomel	52	(4)
2011	Vitebsk	27	(2)
2012	Dnepr Mogilev	21	(3)
2013	Dinamo Brest	3	(0)
2013	Vedrich-97 Rechitsa	13	(0)
2014–2015	Vitebsk	54	(3)
2016–2019	Lokomotiv Gomel	103	(3)
2020	Sputnik Rechitsa	15	(4)
2021	Bumprom Gomel	14	(3)

International career
2005	Belarus U21	1	(0)

Managerial career
- 2021: Sputnik Rechitsa
- 2021–2025: Bumprom Gomel
- * Club domestic league appearances and goals

Alyaksey Krawchanka (Belarusian: Аляксей Краўчанка; Russian: Алексей Кравченко; born 15 January 1985) is a Belarusian professional football coach and former player.
