= Dzmitry Kamarowski =

Belarusian footballer

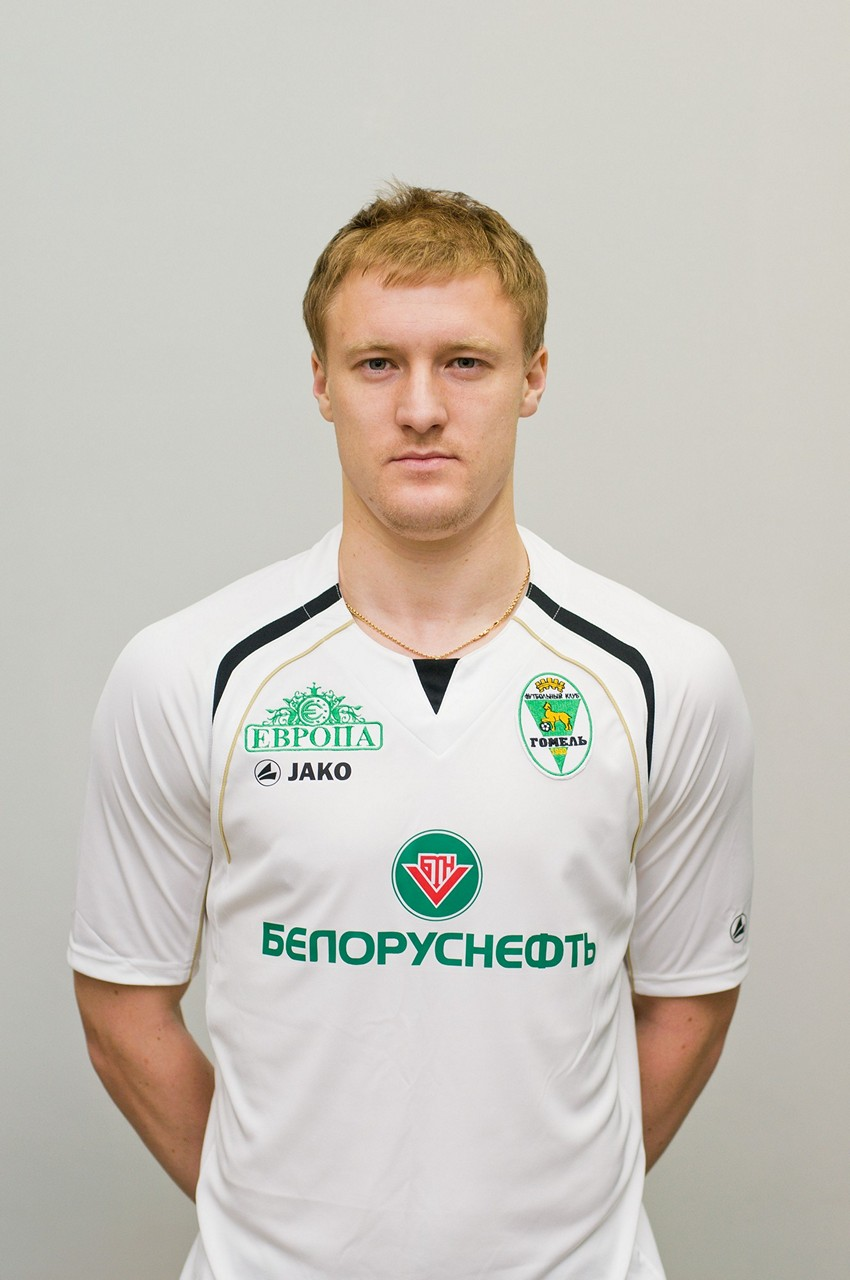

Personal information
- Date of birth: 10 October 1986 (age 40)
- Place of birth: Orsha, Vitebsk Oblast, Belarusian SSR
- Height: 1.78 m (5 ft 10 in)
- Position: Forward

Team information
- Current team: Isloch Minsk Raion (manager)

Youth career
- 2002–2003: BATE Borisov

Senior career*
Years	Team	Apps	(Gls)
2003–2004	BATE Borisov	24	(5)
2005–2007	Torpedo Moscow	5	(0)
2006	→ Naftan Novopolotsk (loan)	13	(6)
2007–2009	Naftan Novopolotsk	64	(8)
2010–2012	Shakhtyor Soligorsk	96	(25)
2013	Gomel	11	(0)
2013	Rotor Volgograd	14	(2)
2014	Gomel	30	(7)
2015	Shakhtyor Soligorsk	24	(5)
2016	Belshina Bobruisk	10	(1)
2016	Isloch Minsk Raion	11	(3)
2017	Neftchi Fergana	12	(2)
2017–2021	Isloch Minsk Raion	108	(32)

International career
2005–2009	Belarus U21	32	(6)
2012	Belarus	3	(0)

Managerial career
- 2021–2022: Isloch Minsk Raion (assistant)
- 2022–: Isloch Minsk Raion
- * Club domestic league appearances and goals

Dzmitry Alyaksandravich Kamarowski (Belarusian: Дзмітрый Камароўскі; Russian: Дмитрий Александрович Комаровский; born 10 October 1986) is a Belarusian professional football coach and former player. He is the manager of Isloch Minsk Raion.

== International career ==
In February 2012, he received his first call-up to the Belarus national side following the withdrawal of Sergei Kornilenko due to injury. On 29 February 2012, he made his debut in a friendly match against Moldova.

== Honours ==
Naftan Novopolotsk

- Belarusian Cup winner: 2008–09

Shakhtyor Soligorsk

- Belarusian Cup winner: 2014–15
