= Alyaksandr Grenkow =

Belarusian footballer

Personal information
- Date of birth: 20 January 1978 (age 48)
- Place of birth: Osipovichi, Belarusian SSR
- Height: 1.74 m (5 ft 8 1/2 in)
- Position: Midfielder

Senior career*
Years	Team	Apps	(Gls)
1996–2000	Torpedo Zhodino	100	(13)
2000–2003	Dinamo Minsk	59	(1)
2004–2005	Shakhtyor Soligorsk	42	(5)
2006	Kryvbas Kryvyi Rih	0	(0)
2006–2008	Torpedo Zhodino	64	(4)
2009–2013	Shakhtyor Soligorsk	120	(7)
- * Club domestic league appearances and goals as of 2 December 2013

Alyaksandr Grenkow (Belarusian: Аляксандр Грэнькоў; Russian: Александр Греньков; born 20 January 1978) is a retired Belarusian professional footballer.

== Honours ==
Dinamo Minsk

- Belarusian Cup winner: 2002–03

Shakhtyor Soligorsk

- Belarusian Premier League champion: 2005
- Belarusian Cup winner: 2003–04
