= Aleksandr Semyonov (footballer, born 1982) =

Russian footballer

Personal information
- Full name: Aleksandr Sergeyevich Semyonov
- Date of birth: 11 June 1982 (age 44)
- Height: 1.77 m (5 ft 9 1/2 in)
- Position: Midfielder

Youth career
- Shinnik Yaroslavl

Senior career*
Years	Team	Apps	(Gls)
2000–2002	Torpedo Pavlovo	75	(33)
2002–2003	Shinnik Yaroslavl	0	(0)
2003	Amkar Perm	9	(0)
2004–2005	Lokomotiv-NN Nizhny Novgorod	42	(6)
2005	Dynamo Vologda	11	(1)
2006	Mika Ashtarak	16	(3)
2007	Gazovik Orenburg	10	(2)
2008–2009	Neman Grodno	16	(3)
2010	Dynamo Bryansk	3	(0)
2010	Neman Grodno	6	(0)
2011	Belshina Bobruisk	4	(0)
2012	Neman Grodno	6	(0)
2013	Granit Mikashevichi	25	(4)
2014	Smorgon	24	(6)
2015	Spartak Bogorodsk	15	(5)
- * Club domestic league appearances and goals as of 7 December 2015

Aleksandr Sergeyevich Semyonov (Russian: Александр Серге́евич Семёнов; born 11 June 1982) is a former Russian professional footballer.
