= Syarhey Koshal =

Belarusian footballer

Personal information
- Date of birth: 14 March 1986 (age 40)
- Place of birth: Bobruisk, Byelorussian SSR, Soviet Union
- Height: 1.79 m (5 ft 10 1/2 in)
- Position: Forward

Youth career
- 2002–2005: Dinamo Minsk

Senior career*
Years	Team	Apps	(Gls)
2003	RUOR Minsk	7	(0)
2004	Dinamo-Juni Minsk	27	(8)
2005	Smena Minsk	12	(4)
2006	MTZ-RIPO Minsk	1	(0)
2006	Dižvanagi Rēzekne	34	(12)
2007	Belshina Bobruisk	24	(11)
2008–2010	Minsk	58	(23)
2010	Rudensk	9	(1)
2012	Minsk-2	18	(10)
2012–2014	Minsk	7	(0)
2013–2014	→ Minsk-2	56	(15)
2015–2016	Krumkachy Minsk	38	(17)
2016	Slavia Mozyr	2	(0)
2017	Molodechno-DYuSSh-4	12	(10)
2018–2019	NFK Minsk	50	(18)
2020	Slonim-2017	11	(1)
2020	Dnepr Rogachev	12	(7)
2021	Molodechno	15	(6)
2022	Kirovsk	3	(1)
2023	Torpeda Bobruisk	7	(6)

International career
2009	Belarus	1	(0)
- * Club domestic league appearances and goals as of 31 December 2023

Syarhey Koshal (Belarusian: Сяргей Кошаль; Russian: Серге́й Кошель; born 14 March 1986) is a Belarusian professional footballer.
