= Alyaksandr Dzegtseraw =

Belarusian professional footballer

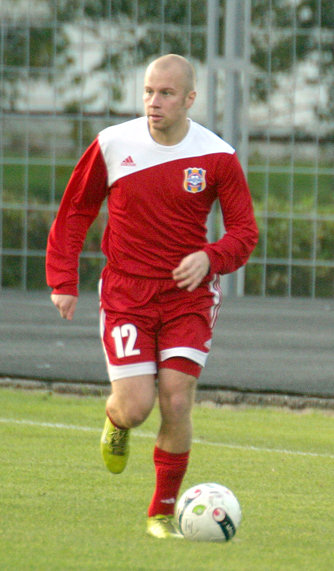

Personal information
- Date of birth: 20 March 1986 (age 40)
- Place of birth: Vitebsk, Soviet Union
- Height: 1.80 m (5 ft 11 in)
- Position: Midfielder

Youth career
- 2002–2003: Torpedo Zhodino
- 2004: Lokomotiv Moscow
- 2005: Torpedo Moscow

Senior career*
Years	Team	Apps	(Gls)
2003	Torpedo Zhodino	4	(0)
2005	Lokomotiv Vitebsk	12	(4)
2006–2010	Naftan Novopolotsk	105	(15)
2011	Belshina Bobruisk	7	(0)
2011–2012	Vitebsk	26	(13)
2013	Naftan Novopolotsk	17	(0)
2014	Vitebsk	13	(2)
2015	Smorgon	23	(1)
2016–2018	Slonim-2017	58	(6)
2018	Orsha	12	(1)
2019	Baranovichi	6	(0)

International career
2006–2009	Belarus U21	18	(1)
- * Club domestic league appearances and goals as of 31 December 2019

Alyaksandr Dzegtseraw (Belarusian: Аляксандр Дзегцяроў; Russian: Александр Дегтерёв; born 20 March 1986) is a Belarusian former professional footballer. He played for several teams in the Belarusian Premier League and the Belarusian First League.

== Honours ==
Naftan Novopolotsk

- Belarusian Cup winner: 2008–09
