= Anton Kavalewski =

Belarusian footballer

Anton Kavalevski
Personal information
- Date of birth: 2 February 1986 (age 40)
- Place of birth: Magdeburg, East Germany
- Height: 1.85 m (6 ft 1 in)
- Position: Goalkeeper

Youth career
- 2004–2005: Naftan Novopolotsk

Senior career*
Years	Team	Apps	(Gls)
2005	Naftan Novopolotsk	0	(0)
2006	MTZ-RIPO Minsk	0	(0)
2007–2009	Naftan Novopolotsk	55	(0)
2009	Vitebsk	3	(0)
2010	Belshina Bobruisk	8	(0)
2011	Torpedo-BelAZ Zhodino	15	(0)
2012	Dnepr Mogilev	17	(0)
2013–2014	Belshina Bobruisk	12	(0)
2014	Isloch Minsk Raion	5	(0)

International career
2007–2009	Belarus U-21	4	(0)
- * Club domestic league appearances and goals as of 1 December 2014

Anton Kavalevski (Belarusian: Антон Кавалеўскі; Russian: Антон Ковалевский (Anton Kovalevskiy); born 2 February 1986) is a Belarusian former professional footballer.

== Honours ==
Naftan Novopolotsk

- Belarusian Cup winner: 2008–09
