= Mikalay Ramanyuk =

Belarusian footballer

Personal information
- Date of birth: 2 June 1984 (age 42)
- Place of birth: Rechitsa, Gomel Oblast, Belarusian SSR
- Height: 1.89 m (6 ft 2 1/2 in)
- Position: Goalkeeper

Youth career
- 2000–2005: Slavia Mozyr

Senior career*
Years	Team	Apps	(Gls)
2000	Mozyr	1	(0)
2001–2002	Polesye Kozenki	28	(0)
2005	Slavia Mozyr	2	(0)
2006–2007	Vedrich-97 Rechitsa	44	(0)
2008–2013	Naftan Novopolotsk	79	(0)
2014	Gomel	5	(0)
2015–2016	Slavia Mozyr	44	(0)
2017–2019	Gorodeya	33	(0)
2020–2022	Slavia Mozyr	15	(0)
- * Club domestic league appearances and goals as of 31 December 2022

Mikalay Ramanyuk (Belarusian: Мікалай Раманюк; Russian: Николай Романюк; born 2 June 1984) is a Belarusian former professional footballer.

== Honours ==
Naftan Novopolotsk

- Belarusian Cup winner: 2008–09, 2011–12
