= Vyachaslaw Holik =

Belarusian footballer

Personal information
- Date of birth: 1 May 1989 (age 37)
- Place of birth: Mogilev, Belarusian SSR, Soviet Union
- Height: 1.86 m (6 ft 1 in)
- Position: Defender

Senior career*
| Years | Team | Apps | (Gls) |
| 2007–2008 | Savit Mogilev | 9 | (1) |
| 2009–2010 | Naftan Novopolotsk | 1 | (0) |
| 2010–2012 | Slavia Mozyr | 36 | (3) |
| 2013 | Granit Mikashevichi | 4 | (0) |
| 2014 | Rechitsa-2014 | 24 | (1) |
| 2015–2019 | Khimik Svetlogorsk | 115 | (6) |

International career
| 2009 | Belarus U21 | 6 | (0) |
- * Club domestic league appearances and goals as of 31 December 2019

Vyachaslaw Holik (Belarusian: Вячаслаў Голік; Russian: Вячеслав Голик; born 1 May 1989) is a Belarusian former professional footballer.

In July 2020 Holik was found guilty of being involved in a match-fixing schema in Belarusian football. He was sentenced to 1 year of house arrest and banned from Belarusian football for three years.
