= Vitaly Ridlevich =

Belarusian footballer

Personal information
- Date of birth: 12 April 1991 (age 35)
- Place of birth: Novolukoml, Belarusian SSR
- Height: 1.95 m (6 ft 5 in)
- Position: Goalkeeper

Youth career
- 2008–2011: Naftan Novopolotsk

Senior career*
Years	Team	Apps	(Gls)
2012–2015	Naftan Novopolotsk	1	(0)
2012	→ Zhlobin (loan)	8	(0)
2012	→ Polotsk (loan)	6	(0)
2013	→ Polotsk (loan)	7	(0)
2014	→ Slonim (loan)	3	(0)
2014	→ Zvezda-BGU Minsk (loan)	2	(0)
2015	→ Zhlobin (loan)	3	(0)
- * Club domestic league appearances and goals as of 20 December 2015

Vitaly Ridlevich (Belarusian: Віталь Рыдлевіч; Russian: Виталий Ридлевич; born 12 April 1991) is a former Belarusian footballer.
