= Mikalay Yazerski =

Belarusian footballer

Personal information
- Date of birth: 17 June 1984 (age 42)
- Height: 1.80 m (5 ft 11 in)
- Position: Defender

Youth career
- 2001–2003: Neman Grodno

Senior career*
Years	Team	Apps	(Gls)
2003–2008	Neman Grodno	128	(4)
2009–2012	Naftan Novopolotsk	33	(0)

International career
2004	Belarus U21	6	(0)
- * Club domestic league appearances and goals as of 27 December 2013

Mikalay Yazerski (Belarusian: Мікалай Язерскі; Russian: Николай Езерский; born 17 June 1984) is a retired Belarusian professional footballer.

== Honours ==
Naftan Novopolotsk

- Belarusian Cup winner: 2008–09, 2011–12
