= Mikhail Kolyadko =

Belarusian footballer

Personal information
- Date of birth: 30 November 1987 (age 38)
- Place of birth: Minsk, Belarusian SSR
- Height: 1.82 m (5 ft 11 1/2 in)
- Position: Midfielder

Youth career
- 2005–2007: Minsk

Senior career*
Years	Team	Apps	(Gls)
2005	Smena Minsk	3	(0)
2006–2007	Minsk	17	(1)
2008	Kommunalnik Slonim	23	(4)
2009	Baranovichi	24	(15)
2010	Gomel	29	(4)
2011	Gorodeya	27	(9)
2012	Olimpia Elbląg	10	(1)
2012	Gorodeya	4	(0)
2013	Dinamo Brest	4	(0)
2013–2014	Rechitsa-2014	44	(21)
2015–2017	Gorodeya	56	(2)
2017–2018	Atlantas	22	(1)
2018	Kauno Žalgiris	8	(0)
2019	Slavia Mozyr	2	(0)
2019–2021	Krumkachy Minsk	73	(8)
2022–2023	Belshina Bobruisk	48	(3)
2024–2025	Naftan Novopolotsk	56	(2)

International career
2004	Belarus U17	6	(0)
2006	Belarus U19	12	(0)
- * Club domestic league appearances and goals as of 3 April 2026

Mikhail Kolyadko (Belarusian: Мiхаiл Калядка; Russian: Михаил Колядко; born 30 November 1987) is a Belarusian professional footballer who plays as a midfielder.

== Career ==
Born in Minsk, Kolyadko began playing football in FC Minsk youth system. He joined the senior team where he made his Belarusian Premier League debut in the 2007 season.

In 2017 play in FK Atlantas Klaipėda. In summer 2018 went from Atlantas to FK Kauno Žalgiris.

Kolyadko has made appearances for the Belarus national under-17 football team and Belarus national under-19 football team.
