= Elmar Xeyirov =

Azerbaijani footballer (born 1987)

Personal information
- Date of birth: 14 January 1987 (age 39)
- Height: 1.75 m (5 ft 9 in)
- Position: Midfielder

Senior career*
Years	Team	Apps	(Gls)
2003–2005	Inter Baku	6	(1)
2006–2007	Simurq	6	(0)
2007–2008	ABN Bärdä	7	(0)
2008–2009	MTZ-RIPO Minsk	1	(0)
2008	→ Darida Minsk Raion (loan)	11	(1)
2009	→ Smorgon (loan)	3	(0)

International career
2007–2008	Azerbaijan U21		
- * Club domestic league appearances and goals

Elmar Xeyirov (born 14 January 1987) is a retired Azerbaijani professional footballer.

He was called up for Azerbaijan U21 national team during 2007–08 qualifying cycle.
