= Vagner (footballer, born 1987) =

Brazilian footballer

Personal information
- Full name: Vagner Pereira Costa
- Date of birth: 1 June 1987 (age 39)
- Place of birth: Ourinhos, Brazil
- Height: 1.83 m (6 ft 0 in)
- Position: Midfielder

Senior career*
| Years | Team | Apps | (Gls) |
| 2006 | União Barbarense | 22 | (10) |
| 2006–2007 | Darida Minsk Raion | 30 | (2) |
| 2008–2009 | Granit Mikashevichi | 29 | (2) |
| 2010–2011 | Ordabasy | 53 | (8) |
| 2012 | Kaisar | 7 | (1) |
| 2013 | Bangu | | |
| 2014 | Desportiva-ES | | |
| 2015 | Santacruzense | | |
| 2015–2016 | Mqabba | | |
- * Club domestic league appearances and goals

Vagner Pereira Costa (born 1 June 1987 in Ourinhos) is a Brazilian former footballer.

== Career ==
Vagner began his career with União Barbarense and in spring 2006 he joined Darida. In January 2008 he moved to with Granit Mikashevichi.

== Honors ==
Ordabasy

- Kazakhstan Cup (1): 2011
