= Eduard Gatiyev =

Russian footballer (born 1978)

Personal information
- Full name: Eduard Ramazanovich Gatiyev
- Date of birth: 3 March 1978 (age 48)
- Height: 1.80 m (5 ft 11 in)
- Position: Defender

Senior career*
Years	Team	Apps	(Gls)
1996–1998	Iriston Vladikavkaz	52	(1)
1999–2003	Avtodor Vladikavkaz	130	(17)
2004–2005	Lada Togliatti	63	(3)
2006	Lokomotiv Minsk	12	(3)
2007	Gomel	22	(1)
2008	Shakhtyor Soligorsk	3	(1)
2009	Avtodor Vladikavkaz	2	(0)
- * Club domestic league appearances and goals

Eduard Ramazanovich Gatiyev (Russian: Эдуард Рамазанович Гатиев; born 3 March 1978) is a former Russian professional footballer.

== Honours ==
- Belarusian Premier League runner-up: 2007.
