= Deimantas Bička =

Lithuanian footballer

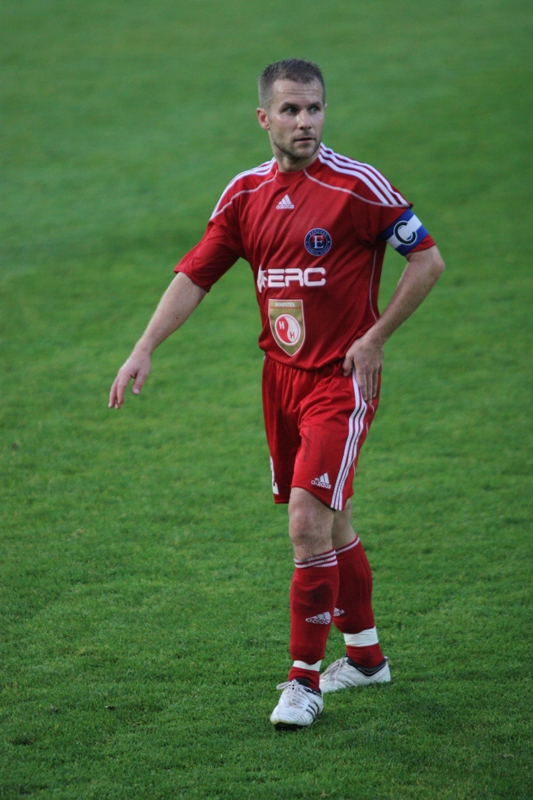

Personal information
- Date of birth: 13 February 1972 (age 54)
- Height: 1.69 m (5 ft 6 1/2 in)
- Position: Midfielder

Senior career*
Years	Team	Apps	(Gls)
1992–1994	FK Panerys Vilnius		
1994–1995	FK Ekranas	14	(3)
1995–1999	FK Kareda		
1999–2001	FC Sheriff Tiraspol		
2001–2007	FK Ventspils	134	(28)
2007–2010	FK Ekranas	105	(24)
Total		253	(55)

International career^{‡}
1993	Lithuania	2	(0)
- * Club domestic league appearances and goals as of 17 December 2009 ‡ National team caps and goals as of 4 October 2008

Deimantas Bička (born 13 February 1972) is a retired Lithuanian football midfielder. In 2008, he was proclaimed the best player of the A Lyga. He retired from professional football on 13 November 2010.

Bička made two appearances for the Lithuania national football team during 1993.
