= Alyaksandr Talkanitsa =

Belarusian footballer

Personal information
- Date of birth: 9 May 1989 (age 37)
- Place of birth: Vawkavysk, Grodno Oblast, Belarusian SSR
- Height: 1.80 m (5 ft 11 in)
- Position: Midfielder

Youth career
- PMC Postavy

Senior career*
Years	Team	Apps	(Gls)
2006	PMC Postavy	31	(2)
2007–2011	Partizan Minsk	99	(11)
2012	Belshina Bobruisk	21	(1)
2013	Dinamo Brest	10	(0)
2014	Granit Mikashevichi	21	(0)
2015–2019	Smorgon	113	(15)

International career
2008–2011	Belarus U21	7	(0)
2011	Belarus Olympic	3	(0)
- * Club domestic league appearances and goals as of 4 July 2019

Alyaksandr Talkanitsa (Belarusian: Аляксандр Талканіца; Russian: Александр Толканица; born 9 May 1989) is a Belarusian former professional footballer.

== Honours ==
MTZ-RIPO Minsk

- Belarusian Cup winner: 2007–08
