= Andrey Bakhno =

Belarusian footballer

Personal information
- Date of birth: 19 November 1973 (age 52)
- Place of birth: Mikashevichi, Brest Oblast, Belarusian SSR
- Position: Defender

Senior career*
| Years | Team | Apps | (Gls) |
| 1994–1997 | Shakhtyor Soligorsk | 29 | (1) |
| 1998–2000 | Granit Mikashevichi | 71 | (25) |
| 2000 | Žalgiris Vilnius | 4 | (0) |
| 2000–2002 | Hetman Zamość | 3 | (1) |
| 2003–2012 | Granit Mikashevichi | 252 | (7) |
| 2021 | Granit Mikashevichi | 6 | (0) |
- * Club domestic league appearances and goals

Andrey Bakhno (Belarusian: Андрэй Бахно; Russian: Андрей Бохно; born 19 November 1973) is a Belarusian former professional footballer who played as a defender.

== Career ==
He spent the majority of his career in Granit Mikashevichi, as a player and later as director. His older brother Valery Bakhno is also a former footballer and head coach in Granit Mikashevichi.
