= Dzyanis Sashcheka =

Belarusian footballer

Personal information
- Date of birth: 3 October 1981 (age 45)
- Place of birth: Asipovichy, Mogilev Oblast, Belarusian SSR
- Height: 1.72 m (5 ft 7 1/2 in)
- Position: Midfielder

Youth career
- 1998–2001: RUOR Minsk

Senior career*
Years	Team	Apps	(Gls)
1998–2001	RUOR Minsk	85	(23)
2002–2006	Torpedo Zhodino	95	(13)
2005	→ Halmstad (loan)	11	(0)
2006–2008	MTZ-RIPO Minsk	64	(4)
2009	Granit Mikashevichi	24	(2)
2010	Belshina Bobruisk	31	(2)
2011	Minsk	32	(1)
2012	SKVICH Minsk	14	(4)
2012–2014	Gorodeya	60	(9)
2016	Torpedo Minsk	22	(1)

International career
2003–2004	Belarus U21	4	(0)
2004–2005	Belarus	4	(0)
- * Club domestic league appearances and goals as of 31 December 2016

Dzyanis Sashcheka (Belarusian: Дзяніс Сашчэка; Russian: Денис Сащеко; born 3 October 1981) is a Belarusian former professional footballer.

== Honours ==
MTZ-RIPO Minsk

- Belarusian Cup winner: 2007–08
