= Juvenal (Brazilian footballer, born 1979) =

Brazilian footballer

Personal information
- Full name: Juvenal Gomes da Silva
- Date of birth: June 5, 1979 (age 47)
- Place of birth: São Paulo, Brazil
- Height: 1.84 m (6 ft 0 in)
- Position: Defender

Senior career*
Years	Team	Apps	(Gls)
1999–2001	União Mogi		
2002	São José		
2005	Flamengo Guarulhos		
2005	Toledo Futebol		
2006	Dinamo Minsk	19	(0)
2007–2008	Neman Grodno	48	(3)
2009	Dinamo Minsk	0	(0)
2010	Naftan Novopolotsk	25	(0)
2011–2012	Šiauliai	57	(0)
2013	Blumenau		
2014	Hermann Aichinger		
- * Club domestic league appearances and goals

Juvenal Gomes da Silva (born 5 June 1979, in São Paulo), known as just Juvenal, is a retired Brazilian professional footballer.
