= Maksim Hukayla =

Belarusian footballer

Personal information
- Date of birth: 16 October 1979 (age 47)
- Height: 1.87 m (6 ft 1 1/2 in)
- Position: Defender

Youth career
- 1998–2001: Dinamo Minsk

Senior career*
Years	Team	Apps	(Gls)
1998	Real Minsk	24	(3)
1999–2001	Dinamo Minsk	1	(0)
1999–2000	→ Dinamo-Juni Minsk	41	(3)
2000	→ Dinamo-2 Minsk	9	(1)
2001	→ Dinamo-Juni Minsk	15	(2)
2002–2003	Naftan Novopolotsk	4	(0)
2003	→ Lokomotiv Vitsebsk (loan)	14	(2)
2004–2010	Shakhtyor Soligorsk	134	(9)
2011	Vitebsk	32	(2)
2012	Granit Mikashevichi	12	(0)
- * Club domestic league appearances and goals as of 31 December 2012

Maksim Hukayla (Belarusian: Максім Гукайла; Russian: Максим Гукайло; born 16 October 1979) is a retired Belarusian professional footballer. His latest club was Granit Mikashevichi in 2012.

== Honours ==
Shakhtyor Soligorsk

- Belarusian Premier League champion: 2005
- Belarusian Cup winner: 2003–04
