= Aboubacar Camara (footballer, born 1988) =

Guinean professional footballer

Abou Camara
Personal information
- Full name: Aboubacar Camara
- Date of birth: November 3, 1988 (age 38)
- Place of birth: Conakry, Guinea
- Height: 1.76 m (5 ft 9 1/2 in)
- Position: Central midfielder

Youth career
- 2004–2005: Hafia Football Club
- 2006: Université De Conakry

Senior career*
Years	Team	Apps	(Gls)
2007–2011	Partizan Minsk	93	(8)
2012	Minsk	9	(0)
2013–2014	Métlaoui	32	(2)
2015–2017	Sidi Bouzid	19	(1)
2016	→ Gabès (loan)	4	(0)
2018	Sundbybergs IK		
- * Club domestic league appearances and goals as of 1 March 2017

Aboubacar Camara (born 3 November 1988) is a Guinean former professional footballer.
