= Alyaksandr Yatskevich =

Belarusian footballer

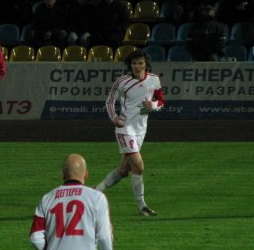
- Alyaksandr Yatskevich in 2009.

Personal information
- Full name: Alyaksandr Yatskevich
- Date of birth: 4 January 1985 (age 41)
- Place of birth: Beloozersk, Brest Oblast, Belarusian SSR
- Height: 1.82 m (5 ft 11 1/2 in)
- Position: Forward

Team information
- Current team: Krumkachy Minsk
- Number: 8

Youth career
- 2002–2003: Dinamo Minsk

Senior career*
Years	Team	Apps	(Gls)
2003–2004	Dinamo-Juni Minsk	40	(2)
2005–2007	Veras Nesvizh	72	(14)
2008	Darida Minsk Raion	14	(1)
2008–2011	Naftan Novopolotsk	91	(6)
2012–2015	Torpedo-BelAZ Zhodino	93	(11)
2015	Belshina Bobruisk	11	(3)
2016–2019	Slutsk	74	(5)
2019–	Krumkachy Minsk	94	(38)
- * Club domestic league appearances and goals as of 31 December 2022

Alyaksandr Yatskevich (Belarusian: Аляксандр Яцкевіч; Russian: Александр Яцкевич; born 4 January 1985) is a Belarusian professional footballer who plays for Krumkachy Minsk.

== Honours ==
Naftan Novopolotsk

- Belarusian Cup winner: 2008–09, 2011–12
