= 2001–02 Belarusian Cup =

Tournament details
- Country: Belarus
- Teams: 36

Final positions
- Champions: Gomel (1st title)
- Runners-up: BATE Borisov

Tournament statistics
- Matches played: 40
- Goals scored: 96 (2.4 per match)
- Top goal scorer(s): Artem Kontsevoy; Aleksey Denisenya (5 goals)

The 2001–02 Belarusian Cup was the 11th season of the Belarusian annual football cup competition. Contrasting the league season, it was conducted in a fall-spring rhythm. The first games were played on 15 August 2001, with the final played on 26 May 2002. Gomel won the Cup and qualified for the UEFA Cup qualifying round.

== First round ==
The draw was conducted on 31 July 2001. Four First League clubs (Darida Minsk Raion, Zvezda-VA-BGU Minsk, Kommunalnik Slonim and Torpedo-Kadino Mogilev) were given a bye to the next round by a drawing of lots.

15 August 2001	RUOR Minsk (III)	0–1	Torpedo Zhodino (II)	Minsk
15:00			Lesun 2'	Stadium: Orbita Stadium; Attendance: 200; Referee: Aleksei Kulbakov (Gomel)

15 August 2001	SKAF Minsk (III)	2–0	Rogachev-DYUSSH-1 (II)	Minsk
16:00	Mikhadyuk 54'; Golovnin 77'			Stadium: BGAFK Stadium; Attendance: 200; Referee: Mikhail Arkhipov (Zhodino)

15 August 2001	Lokomotiv Minsk (III)	2–0	Neman Mosty (II)	Minsk
17:00	Kukar 15'; Volskiy 90'			Stadium: Kamvolschik Stadium; Attendance: 100; Referee: Vladimir Sukhovarov (Orsha)

15 August 2001	Smorgon (III)	0–0 (a.e.t.) (4–2 p)	Keramik Bereza (II)	Smorgon
17:30	Shurlo 16'; Pavlovets 43'		Gamanovich 4'; Kazlow 34'	Stadium: City Stadium; Attendance: 3,000; Referee: Aleksandr Chebykin (Minsk)
	Penalties
	Ivanow (penalty scored); Kurak (penalty scored); Pogotskiy (penalty scored); Selivanov (penalty scored); Porkulevich (penalty missed)		(penalty scored) Zubach; (penalty scored) Shved; (penalty missed) Boyko; (penalty missed) Timoshik

15 August 2001	Veras Nesvizh (III)	2–0	Svisloch Osipovichi (II)	Nesvizh
18:00	Ischenko 15' (pen.); Pislyak 86'			Stadium: Urozhay Stadium; Attendance: 300; Referee: Yuriy Maistrov (Fanipol)

15 August 2001	Zabudova Chist (III)	0–2	Granit Mikashevichi (II)	Chist
18:00			Kirilko 31', 68'	Stadium: School Stadium; Attendance: 300; Referee: Vadim Zhuk (Minsk)

15 August 2001	Pinsk-900 (III)	2–1 (a.e.t.)	Lida (II)	Pinsk
18:00	Komkov 12'; Papichyts 102'		Komkov 74' (o.g.)	Stadium: Pripyat Stadium; Attendance: 1,000; Referee: Valeriy Petrovich (Minsk)

15 August 2001	Starye Dorogi (III)	0–1 (a.e.t.)	Khimik Svetlogorsk (II)	Starye Dorogi
18:00			Ulezlo 94'	Stadium: City Stadium; Attendance: 1,000; Referee: Andrey Zhukov (Minsk)

15 August 2001	Baranovichi (III)	w/o	Orsha (II)	Baranovichi

== Round of 32 ==
The draw was conducted on 16 August 2001. Five Premier League clubs (Dinamo Minsk, Neman-Belcard Grodno, Molodechno-2000, Gomel and Belshina Bobruisk) advanced to the next round by a drawing of lots.

26 August 2001	Torpedo-Kadino Mogilev (II)	2–3	Naftan Novopolotsk	Mogilev
17:00	Shurlo 16'; Pavlovets 43'		Gamanovich 4' (pen.), 85'; Kazlow 34'	Stadium: Torpedo Stadium; Attendance: 300; Referee: Valeriy Petrovich (Minsk)

26 August 2001	Zvezda-VA-BGU Minsk (II)	0–1	Dnepr-Transmash Mogilev	Minsk
17:00			Solodukhin 68'	Stadium: Kamvolschik Stadium; Attendance: 1,200; Referee: Vladimir Sukhovarov (Orsha)

26 August 2001	Baranovichi (III)	1–0	Lokomotiv-96 Vitebsk	Baranovichi
17:00	Chuduk 85'			Stadium: Lokomotiv Stadium; Attendance: 4,000; Referee: Viktor Matyushev (Minsk)

26 August 2001	Granit Mikashevichi (II)	1–2	Dinamo Brest	Mikashevichi
17:00	Starkov 52'		Naperkovsky 57'; Denisenya 71'	Stadium: Granit Stadium; Attendance: 2,000; Referee: Kazimir Znaydinsky (Grodno)

26 August 2001	Veras Nesvizh (III)	1–3	Slavia Mozyr	Nesvizh
17:00	Shushkevich 64'		Rakovskiy 30'; Karytska 40'; Matveychik 46'	Stadium: Urozhay Stadium; Attendance: 2,560; Referee: Vadim Zhuk (Minsk)

26 August 2001	Khimik Svetlogorsk (II)	2–1	Torpedo Zhodino (II)	Svetlogorsk
17:00	Ulezlo 28'; Dym 74' (pen.)		Sahakyan 46'	Stadium: Bumazhnik Stadium; Attendance: 5,800; Referee: Yuriy Kuntsevich (Grodno)

26 August 2001	Pinsk-900 (III)	1–2 (a.e.t.)	Lokomotiv Minsk (III)	Pinsk
17:00	Komkov 79'		Azyava 86'; Asipenka 110'	Stadium: Pripyat Stadium; Attendance: 2,000; Referee: Mikhail Arkhipov (Zhodino)

26 August 2001	Smorgon (III)	0–3	Torpedo-MAZ Minsk	Smorgon
17:30			Shvydakow 3'; Rogovik 66'; Denisyuk 78'	Stadium: Yunost Stadium; Attendance: 4,500; Referee: Oleg Chikun (Stolbtsy)

26 August 2001	Kommunalnik Slonim (II)	1–3	Vedrich-97 Rechitsa	Slonim
18:00	Horbach 32'		Novash 45'; Parfyonaw 57'; Yusipets 73' (pen.)	Stadium: Dinamo Stadium; Attendance: 2,000; Referee: Aleksandr Chebykin (Minsk)

26 August 2001	BATE Borisov	6–0	SKAF Minsk (III)	Borisov
18:00	Lisovskiy 42'; Kontsevoy 49', 68', 74'; Mironchik 86'; Goncharenko 89'			Stadium: City Stadium; Attendance: 1,500; Referee: Aleksei Kulbakov (Gomel)

27 August 2001	Darida Minsk Raion (II)	0–1	Shakhtyor Soligorsk	Minsk
17:00			Downar 80'	Stadium: Darida Stadium; Attendance: 1,400; Referee: Valery Vyalichka (Minsk)

1. Match moved to the opponent's ground after original draw per mutual agreement.

== Round of 16 ==
The games were played on 14 October 2001.

14 October 2001	Torpedo-MAZ Minsk	1–2	BATE Borisov	Minsk
15:00	Denisyuk 34' (pen.)		Lisovskiy 64'; Kontsevoy 86'	Stadium: Torpedo Stadium; Attendance: 2,500; Referee: Vladimir Sukhovarov (Orsha)

14 October 2001	Shakhtyor Soligorsk	2–1	Neman-Belcard Grodno	Soligorsk
15:00	Podrez 8' (pen.); Bezborodov 82'		Tarashchyk 75'	Stadium: Stroitel Stadium; Attendance: 1,700; Referee: Vadim Zhuk (Minsk)

14 October 2001	Gomel	2–1	Molodechno-2000	Gomel
15:00	Borel 28'; Kuznetsov 90'		Turchinovich 18'	Stadium: Luch Stadium; Attendance: 2,100; Referee: Andrey Zhukov (Minsk)

14 October 2001	Naftan Novopolotsk	0–1 (a.e.t.)	Dinamo Minsk	Novopolotsk
15:00			Razin 119'	Stadium: Atlant Stadium; Attendance: 5,000; Referee: Kazimir Znaydinsky (Grodno)

14 October 2001	Dinamo Brest	4–0	Baranovichi (III)	Brest
15:00	Denisenya 9', 79', 90'; Strakhanovich 41'			Stadium: OSK Brestsky; Attendance: 2,100; Referee: Valeriy Yazevich (Lida)

14 October 2001	Slavia Mozyr	2–1 (a.e.t.)	Vedrich-97 Rechitsa	Mozyr
15:30	Strypeykis 43'; Klimenka 100'		Parfyonaw 89'	Stadium: Yunost Stadium; Attendance: 1,100; Referee: Valery Vyalichka (Minsk)

14 October 2001	Khimik Svetlogorsk (II)	3–0	Belshina Bobruisk	Svetlogorsk
16:00	Shelukhin 59'; Ulezlo 72'; Dym 90'			Stadium: Bumazhnik Stadium; Attendance: 7,000; Referee: Mikhail Arkhipov (Zhodino)

14 October 2001	Dnepr-Transmash Mogilev	0–1	Lokomotiv Minsk (III)	Mogilev
16:00			Zuew 74'	Stadium: Spartak Stadium; Attendance: 1,200; Referee: Konstantin Daylid (Brest)

== Quarterfinals ==
The first legs were played on 25 April 2002. The second legs were played on 2 May 2002.

Team 1	Agg.	Team 2	1st leg	2nd leg
Lokomotiv Minsk (II)	1–5	Dinamo Brest	0–1	1–4
Shakhtyor Soligorsk	1–1 (a)	Slavia Mozyr	0–0	1–1
Khimik Svetlogorsk (II)	1–6	BATE Borisov	1–1	0–5
Gomel	2–2 (p)	Dinamo Minsk	1–1	1–1

=== First leg ===
25 April 2002	Lokomotiv Minsk (II)	0–1	Dinamo Brest	Minsk
16:00			Denisenya 40'	Stadium: Lokomotiv Stadium; Attendance: 1,000; Referee: Vladimir Sukhovarov (Orsha)

25 April 2002	Shakhtyor Soligorsk	0–0	Slavia Mozyr	Soligorsk
17:00				Stadium: Stroitel Stadium; Attendance: 2,300; Referee: Yuriy Kuntsevich (Grodno)

25 April 2002	Khimik Svetlogorsk (II)	1–1	BATE Borisov	Svetlogorsk
17:00	Golovach 81'		Kuprikov 36' (o.g.)	Stadium: Bumazhnik Stadium; Attendance: 7,000; Referee: Andrey Zhukov (Minsk)

25 April 2002	Gomel	1–1	Dinamo Minsk	Gomel
17:00	Borel 89' (pen.)		Ivanov 11' (o.g.)	Stadium: Luch Stadium; Attendance: 4,000; Referee: Sergey Shmolik (Brest)

=== Second leg ===
2 May 2002	Dinamo Brest	4–1 (5–1 agg.)	Lokomotiv Minsk (II)	Brest
17:00	Boyka 1', 25', 53'; Panasyuk 14'		Polyakov 35'	Stadium: OSK Brestsky; Attendance: 2,500; Referee: Vladimir Sukhovarov (Orsha)

2 May 2002	Slavia Mozyr	1–1 (1–1 (a) agg.)	Shakhtyor Soligorsk	Mozyr
17:00	Sukhoveyev 66'		Nikifarenka 48'	Stadium: Yunost Stadium; Attendance: 2,000; Referee: Yuriy Kuntsevich (Grodno)

2 May 2002	BATE Borisov	5–0 (6–1 agg.)	Khimik Svetlogorsk (II)	Borisov
17:30	Byahanski 4'; Molosh 34'; Chumachenko 45', 65'; Dyachenko 63' (o.g.)			Stadium: City Stadium; Attendance: 4,000; Referee: Andrey Zhukov (Minsk)

2 May 2002	Dinamo Minsk	1–1 (a.e.t.) (2–2 (p) agg.) (2–3 p)	Gomel	Minsk
19:00	Valadzyankow 14'		Lukashenko 63'	Stadium: Dinamo Stadium; Attendance: 1,500; Referee: Sergey Shmolik (Brest)
	Penalties
	Syarohin (penalty scored); Sokol (penalty scored); Kachura (penalty missed); Bespansky (penalty missed); Hrapkowski (penalty missed)		(penalty scored) Nazarov; (penalty scored) Bliznyuk; (penalty missed) Nikitenko; (penalty missed) Marozaw; (penalty scored) Karsakov

== Semifinals ==
The first legs were played on 10 May 2002. The second legs were played on 18 May 2002.

Team 1	Agg.	Team 2	1st leg	2nd leg
Shakhtyor Soligorsk	0–4	BATE Borisov	0–2	0–2
Dinamo Brest	1–2	Gomel	1–1	0–1

=== First leg ===
10 May 2002	Shakhtyor Soligorsk	0–2	BATE Borisov	Soligorsk
17:00			Kontsevoy 6'; Byahanski 13'	Stadium: Stroitel Stadium; Attendance: 1,500; Referee: Oleg Chikun (Stolbtsy)

10 May 2002	Dinamo Brest	1–1	Gomel	Brest
18:00	Grib 68'		Borel 88'	Stadium: OSK Brestsky; Attendance: 1,500; Referee: Aleksandr Chebykin (Minsk)

=== Second leg ===
18 May 2002	BATE Borisov	2–0 (4–0 agg.)	Shakhtyor Soligorsk	Borisov
17:30	Shmigero 42'; Byahanski 81'			Stadium: City Stadium; Attendance: 2,500; Referee: Oleg Chikun (Stolbtsy)

18 May 2002	Gomel	1–0 (2–1 agg.)	Dinamo Brest	Gomel
18:00	Lukashenko 31'			Stadium: Luch Stadium; Attendance: 4,500; Referee: Aleksandr Chebykin (Minsk)

== Final ==
26 May 2002
17:00 UTC+3

Gomel	2–0	BATE Borisov
Borel 59'; Karsakov 62'	Report

Dinamo Stadium, Vitebsk
Attendance: 3,600
Referee: Vadim Zhuk (Minsk)

GOMEL:
GK	1	(Russia) Vyacheslav Dusmanov (c)
RB	2	(Russia) Nikita Shmykov
CB	3	(Russia) Anton Ivanov
LB	5	(Belarus) Vasiliy Drozdov
DM	7	(Belarus) Fedor Lukashenko	(substituted off) 90'
DM	4	(Belarus) Oleg Cherepnev
RM	10	(Belarus) Maksim Razumaw
LM	11	(Belarus) Andrey Marozaw	(substituted off) 50'
AM	8	(Russia) Dmitri Karsakov
RF	9	(Belarus) Viktor Borel	(substituted off) 82'
LF	6	(Belarus) Gennadi Bliznyuk
Substitutes:
GK	16	(Belarus) Alyaksandr Lyantsevich
MF	12	(Belarus) Sergey Nikitenko	(substituted on) 90'
DF	14	(Belarus) Pavel Krechin
DF	15	(Belarus) Roman Jafarov
MF	17	(Russia) Aleksey Gilimov
MF	18	(Belarus) Alyaksandr Danilaw	(substituted on) 50'
FW	19	(Belarus) Andrei Nazarov	(substituted on) 82'
Manager:
(Russia) Sergei Podpaly

BATE:
GK	1	(Belarus) Alyaksandr Fyedarovich (c)
RB	5	(Belarus) Alyaksey Baha
CB	6	(Belarus) Henadz Mardas
LB	3	(Belarus) Dmitry Molosh	(yellow card) 76'
DM	2	(Belarus) Dzmitry Likhtarovich		(substituted off) 46'
DM	7	(Belarus) Alyaksandr Yermakovich		(substituted off) 76'
RM	11	(Belarus) Yawhen Lashankow
LM	9	(Belarus) Vadim Skripchenko	(yellow card) 61'
AM	8	(Ukraine) Ihor Chumachenko		(substituted off) 65'
RF	10	(Belarus) Artem Kontsevoy	(yellow card) 39'
LF	7	(Belarus) Pavel Byahanski
Substitutes:
GK	16	(Belarus) Yuri Zhevnov
MF	13	(Belarus) Oleg Strakhanovich		(substituted on) 46'
DF	14	(Belarus) Aleksandr Lisovskiy
DF	15	(Belarus) Valery Tarasenka		(substituted on) 76'
MF	17	(Belarus) Pavel Shmigero		(substituted on) 65'
MF	18	(Belarus) Vladimir Nevinsky
DF	19	(Belarus) Viktor Goncharenko
Manager:
(Belarus) Yuri Puntus
