= 2002–03 Belarusian Cup =

Tournament details
- Country: Belarus
- Teams: 31

Final positions
- Champions: Dinamo Minsk (3rd title)
- Runners-up: Lokomotiv Minsk

Tournament statistics
- Matches played: 31
- Goals scored: 88 (2.84 per match)
- Top goal scorer(s): Artem Kontsevoy; Aleksandr Volovik (4 goals)

The 2002–03 Belarusian Cup was the twelfth season of the Belarusian annual football cup competition. Contrary to the league season, the competition has been conducted in a fall-spring rhythm. The first games were played on 7 August 2002 and the final on 24 May 2003. Dinamo Minsk won the Cup and qualified for the UEFA Cup qualifying round.

== First round ==
17 teams joined competition in this round. Six clubs from Second League were drawn against six clubs from First League. Another five First League teams (Darida Minsk Raion, Naftan Novopolotsk, Kommunalnik Slonim, Torpedo-Kadino Mogilev, Khimik Svetlogorsk) advanced to the next round by drawing of lots. The rest of First and Second League teams did not participate in this edition of the Cup. All games were played on 7 August 2002.

7 August 2002	MTZ-RIPO Minsk (III)	5–0	Lida (II)	Minsk
	Yevseychik 25'; Volovik 27', 40', 45' (pen.); Pyatrukovich 90'			Attendance: 500; Referee: Aleksei Kulbakov (Gomel)

7 August 2002	Pinsk-900 (III)	1–2	Lokomotiv Minsk (II)	Pinsk
	Volodko 43'		Kashewski 25', 84'	Attendance: 500; Referee: Mikhail Arkhipov (Zhodino)

7 August 2002	Veras Nesvizh (III)	1–3	Vedrich-97 Rechitsa (II)	Nesvizh
	N.Soltan 61' (pen.)		Yusipets 5', 74'; Demenkovets 41'	Attendance: 1,000; Referee: Valeriy Yazevich (Lida)

7 August 2002	Baranovichi (III)	0–2	Neman Mosty (II)	Baranovichi
			Verbitskiy 72', 88'	Attendance: 1,500; Referee: Aleksandr Skrob (Stolbtsy)

7 August 2002	Vertikal Kalinkovichi (III)	5–1	Smorgon (II)	Kalinkovichi
	Luzhkov 11'; Coda 55' (o.g.); Golovach 79'; Biyazov 84'; Tikhanovsky 88'		Stelmakh 50'	Attendance: 2,500; Referee: Nikita Pyreyev (Minsk)

7 August 2002	Spartak-UOR-Dnepr Shklov (III)	w/o	Granit Mikashevichi (II)	Shklov

== Round of 32 ==
15 winners of previous round were joined by 14 clubs from Premier League. Seven clubs advanced to the next round by drawing of lots (Dinamo Minsk, Dnepr-Transmash Mogilev, Gomel, Molodechno-2000, Torpedo-MAZ Minsk, Lokomotiv Minsk (II), Vertikal Kalinkovichi (III)). The games were played on 18 August 2002.

18 August 2002	MTZ-RIPO Minsk (III)	1–3	Neman Grodno	Minsk
17:00 UTC+3	Volovik 3'		Tarashchyk 1'; Turchinovich 45', 82'	Stadium: Traktor Stadium; Attendance: 1,500; Referee: Vladimir Sukhovarov (Orsha)

18 August 2002	Torpedo-Kadino Mogilev (II)	0–3	Belshina Bobruisk	Mogilev
17:00 UTC+3			Strypeykis 31'; Truhaw 67', 69'	Stadium: Torpedo Stadium; Attendance: 300; Referee: Yuriy Maistrov (Fanipol)

18 August 2002	Neman Mosty (II)	0–1	Zvezda-VA-BGU Minsk	Mosty
17:00 UTC+3			Shushkevich 28'	Stadium: Neman Stadium; Attendance: 2,700; Referee: Oleg Chikun (Stolbtsy)

18 August 2002	Khimik Svetlogorsk (II)	1–4	Slavia Mozyr	Svetlogorsk
17:00 UTC+3	Shelukhin 62'		Korotkevich 7' (pen.), 11'; Balin 24'; Rakovskiy 86'	Stadium: Bumazhnik Stadium; Attendance: 3,000; Referee: Valeriy Petrovich (Minsk)

18 August 2002	Kommunalnik Slonim (II)	0–0 (a.e.t.) (4–5 p)	Lokomotiv-96 Vitebsk	Slonim
17:00 UTC+3				Stadium: Dinamo Stadium; Attendance: 3,500; Referee: Mikhail Arkhipov (Zhodino)
	Penalties
	Volskiy (penalty scored); Misyuk (penalty scored); Vorontsov (penalty scored); Zyulew (penalty scored); Plyut (penalty missed)		(penalty scored) Sigov; (penalty scored) Grudtsin; (penalty scored) Rodionov; (penalty scored) Schuko; (penalty scored) Vasilchuk

18 August 2002	Darida Minsk Raion (II)	0–1 (a.e.t.)	Dinamo Brest	Minsk
17:30 UTC+3			Boyka 119'	Stadium: Darida Stadium; Attendance: 2,000; Referee: Georgiy Verbitsky (Slonim)

18 August 2002	Vedrich-97 Rechitsa (II)	0–4	BATE Borisov	Rechitsa
17:30 UTC+3			Byahanski 32'; Kontsevoy 59' (pen.), 73', 87'	Stadium: Central Stadium; Attendance: 2,000; Referee: Bronislav Yasinskiy (Minsk)

18 August 2002	Naftan Novopolotsk (II)	0–4	Shakhtyor Soligorsk	Novopolotsk
18:00 UTC+3			Trepachkin 36'; Yurevich 42', 49'; Sļesarčuks 58'	Stadium: Atlant Stadium; Attendance: 1,500; Referee: Aleksandr Chebykin (Minsk)

18 August 2002	Granit Mikashevichi (II)	0–1	Torpedo Zhodino	Mikashevichi
18:00 UTC+3			Matveychik 27'	Stadium: Granit Stadium; Attendance: 3,000; Referee: Viktor Matyushev (Minsk)

== Round of 16 ==
The games were played on 15 September 2002.

15 September 2002	Dinamo Brest	2–3 (a.e.t.)	Belshina Bobruisk	Brest
16:00 UTC+3	Denisenya 16'; Prokopyuk 87'		Karolik 50'; Baltrushevich 58' (pen.) 113'	Stadium: OSK Brestsky; Attendance: 1,000; Referee: Aleksandr Ryomin (Minsk)

15 September 2002	Zvezda-VA-BGU Minsk	0–0 (a.e.t.) (2–4 p)	Neman Grodno	Minsk
16:00 UTC+3				Stadium: Traktor Stadium; Attendance: 1,500; Referee: Mikhail Arkhipov (Zhodino)
	Penalties
	Akulich (penalty scored); Makar (penalty scored); Labetskiy (penalty missed); Bylina (penalty missed)		(penalty scored) Kovalevich; (penalty scored) Radushko; (penalty scored) Hintaw; (penalty scored) Lyubchuk

15 September 2002	Lokomotiv-96 Vitebsk	5–3	Molodechno-2000	Vitebsk
16:00 UTC+3	Rodionov 28', 56', 59'; V.Aleshchenko 54'; Karpaw 67'		Sysoy 9'; Azarenok 58', 74'	Stadium: Dinamo Stadium; Attendance: 1,500; Referee: Sergey Shmolik (Brest)

15 September 2002	Shakhtyor Soligorsk	0–1	Dinamo Minsk	Soligorsk
16:15 UTC+3			Vodovozov 86'	Stadium: Stroitel Stadium; Attendance: 1,600; Referee: Vladimir Sukhovarov (Orsha)

15 September 2002	Lokomotiv Minsk (II)	1–0	Slavia Mozyr	Minsk
16:30 UTC+3	Denisyuk 67'			Stadium: Lokomotiv Stadium; Attendance: 800; Referee: Konstantin Daylid (Brest)

15 September 2002	BATE Borisov	3–0	Torpedo-MAZ Minsk	Borisov
17:00 UTC+3	Byahanski 8'; Kontsevoy 81'; Likhtarovich 85'			Stadium: City Stadium; Attendance: 3,000; Referee: Yuriy Kuntsevich (Grodno)

15 September 2002	Torpedo Zhodino	0–2	Dnepr-Transmash Mogilev	Zhodino
17:00 UTC+3			Patskevich 5'; Razhkow 67'	Stadium: Torpedo Stadium; Attendance: 2,000; Referee: Bronislav Yasinskiy (Minsk)

15 September 2002	Vertikal Kalinkovichi (III)	0–2	Gomel	Kalinkovichi
17:00 UTC+3			Danilaw 18'; Bliznyuk 57'	Stadium: City Stadium; Attendance: 3,500; Referee: Valeriy Yazevich (Lida)

== Quarterfinals ==
The games were played on 22 April 2003.

22 April 2003	Lokomotiv Minsk	3–2 (a.e.t.)	Dnepr-Transmash Mogilev	Minsk
15:00 UTC+3	Lukashevich 6' (pen.); Rogovik 43'; Shvydakow 105'		D.Kalachow 51'; Pyschur 86'	Stadium: Lokomotiv Stadium; Attendance: 800; Referee: Yuriy Kuntsevich (Grodno)

22 April 2003	Lokomotiv Vitebsk (II)	1–2	Gomel	Vitebsk
16:30 UTC+3	Praslov 82'		Sulymenko 61'; Ivanov 85'	Stadium: Dinamo Stadium; Attendance: 4,000; Referee: Aleksandr Chebykin (Minsk)

22 April 2003	Belshina Bobruisk	2–1	Neman Grodno	Bobruisk
17:00 UTC+3	Danilyuk 17'; Denisenya 47'		Tarashchyk 19'	Stadium: Spartak Stadium; Attendance: 2,000; Referee: Valery Vyalichka (Minsk)

22 April 2003	BATE Borisov	0–1	Dinamo Minsk	Borisov
17:30 UTC+3			Zlatinov 53'	Stadium: City Stadium; Attendance: 5,000; Referee: Vladimir Sukhovarov (Orsha)

== Semifinals ==
The first legs were played on 8 May 2003. The second legs were played on 16 May 2003.

Team 1	Agg.	Team 2	1st leg	2nd leg
Lokomotiv Minsk	4–3	Belshina Bobruisk	3–0	1–3
Gomel	0–2	Dinamo Minsk	0–0	0–2

=== First leg ===
8 May 2003	Lokomotiv Minsk	3–0	Belshina Bobruisk	Minsk
16:00 UTC+3	Afonasenko 10'; Denisyuk 58' (pen.), 66' (pen.)			Stadium: Lokomotiv Stadium; Attendance: 1,200; Referee: Sergey Shmolik (Brest)

8 May 2003	Gomel	0–0	Dinamo Minsk	Gomel
17:00 UTC+3				Stadium: Luch Stadium; Attendance: 5,000; Referee: Yuriy Kuntsevich (Grodno)

=== Second leg ===
16 May 2003	Belshina Bobruisk	3–1 (3–4 agg.)	Lokomotiv Minsk	Bobruisk
17:30 UTC+3	Denisenya 10'; Hancharyk 18'; Kondrashuk 53'		Shvydakow 25'	Stadium: Spartak Stadium; Attendance: 2,000; Referee: Sergey Shmolik (Brest)

16 May 2003	Dinamo Minsk	2–0 (2–0 agg.)	Gomel	Minsk
18:30 UTC+3	Razhkow 26', 78'			Stadium: Dinamo Stadium; Attendance: 900; Referee: Yuriy Kuntsevich (Grodno)

== Final ==
24 May 2003
18:30 UTC+3

Dinamo Minsk	2–0	Lokomotiv Minsk
M.Tsyhalka 53', 58'	Report

Dinamo Stadium, Minsk
Attendance: 12,000
Referee: Andrey Zhukov (Minsk)

DINAMO:
GK	1	(Belarus) Yury Tsyhalka
RB	2	(Belarus) Yan Tsiharaw
CB	3	(Ukraine) Andriy Raspopov
CB	6	(Belarus) Raman Kirenkin
LB	5	(Belarus) Kiril Pavlyuchek
DM	9	(Belarus) Syarhey Kavalchuk (c)
RM	10	(Belarus) Ihar Razhkow		(substituted off) 83'
LM	4	(Belarus) Andrey Milewski
AM	7	(Bulgaria) Petar Zlatinov	(yellow card) 25'
FW	8	(Belarus) Vital Valadzyankow	(yellow card) 65'	(substituted off) 86'
FW	11	(Belarus) Maksim Tsyhalka		(substituted off) 77'
Substitutes:
GK	12	(Belarus) Ruslan Kapantsow
FW	13	(Belarus) Kirill Andreyenko
MF	14	(Belarus) Viktor Sokol		(substituted on) 83'
FW	15	(Belarus) Mikalay Ryndzyuk		(substituted on) 86'
MF	16	(Belarus) Yury Vodovozov
FW	17	(Belarus) Sergei Kornilenko		(substituted on) 77'
DF	18	(Belarus) Anton Rabtsaw
Manager:
(Bulgaria) Georgi Gyurov

LOKOMOTIV:
GK	1	(Belarus) Vital Makawchyk
RB	3	(Belarus) Yawhen Linyow
CB	8	(Georgia (country)) Georgi Berianidze
CB	2	(Brazil) Cristovao Trombin		(substituted off) 63'
LB	6	(Belarus) Dmitry Rogovik
RM	7	(Belarus) Dmitry Denisyuk
CM	5	(Belarus) Andrey Lukashevich	(yellow card) 26'	(substituted off) 46'
CM	4	(Belarus) Sergey Kabelskiy (c)
LM	9	(Belarus) Mihail Litvinchuk	(yellow card) 27'	(substituted off) 46'
AM	10	(Belarus) Aleksandr Afonasenko
FW	11	(Belarus) Mikalay Shvydakow
Substitutes:
GK	12	(Russia) Aleksandr Kotlyarov
MF	13	(Belarus) Alyaksandr Mikhnavets	(yellow card) 67'	(substituted on) 46'
MF	14	(Belarus) Mikalay Kashewski		(substituted on) 46'
DF	15	(Belarus) Sergey Polyakov		(substituted on) 63'
DF	16	(Belarus) Syarhey Khaletski
FW	17	(Belarus) Dzmitry Asipenka
MF	18	(Georgia (country)) Zaza Kvekveskiri
Manager:
(Belarus) Anatoliy Yurevich
