= 2001 Belarusian First League =

Belarusian First League
- Season: 2001
- Champions: Torpedo Zhodino
- Promoted: Torpedo Zhodino; Zvezda-VA-BGU Minsk
- Relegated: Orsha
- Matches: 210
- Goals: 581 (2.77 per match)

2001 Belarusian First League was the 11th season of 2nd level football championship in Belarus. It started in April and ended in November 2001.

== Team changes from 2000 season ==
Winners of last season (Molodechno) were promoted to Belarusian Premier League. They were replaced by the three teams that finished at the bottom of 2000 Belarusian Premier League table (Kommunalnik Slonim, Lida and Torpedo-Kadino Mogilev).

Four teams that finished at the bottom of 2000 season table (Traktor Minsk, Khimik Svetlogorsk, Veino-Dnepr and Polesye Kozenki) relegated to the Second League. They were replaced by two best teams of 2000 Second League (Darida Minsk Raion and Akadem-Slavia Minsk).

Luninets, who finished 2nd last season, disbanded during the off-season. Traktor Minsk were invited back to the First League to replace the team, but declined the offer. Khimik Svetlogorsk were invited instead and accepted invitation.

Before the start of the season, FC Rogachev changed their name to Rogachev-DUSSh-1, Svisloch-Krovlya Osipovichi to Svisloch Osipovichi and Akadem-Slavia Minsk were renamed to SKAF Minsk.

A week before the start of the season newly promoted SKAF Minsk withdrew back to the Second League, after their partnership with Slavia Mozyr (of whom they were previously a farm club) suddenly ended, along with the financial supply. No team was able to replace SKAF on a short notice and the league was reduced to 15 clubs for the season.

== Teams and locations ==
Location of teams in 2001 Belarusian First League

Team	Location	Position in 2000
Lida	Lida	Premier League, 14
Torpedo-Kadino	Mogilev	Premier League, 15
Kommunalnik	Slonim	Premier League, 16
Neman	Mosty	3
Zvezda-VA-BGU	Minsk	4
Granit	Mikashevichi	5
Keramik	Bereza	6
Torpedo	Zhodino	7
Svisloch	Osipovichi	8
Orsha	Orsha	9
Rogachev-DUSSh-1	Rogachev	10
Dinamo-Juni	Minsk	11
ZLiN	Gomel	12
Khimik	Svetlogorsk	14
Darida	Minsk Raion	Second League, 1

== League table ==
Pos	Team	Pld	W	D	L	GF	GA	GD	Pts	Promotion or relegation
1	Torpedo Zhodino (P)	28	21	3	4	56	13	+43	66	Promotion to Belarusian Premier League
2	Zvezda-VA-BGU Minsk (P)	28	19	5	4	74	21	+53	62	Promotion to Belarusian Premier League
3	Darida Minsk Raion	28	19	4	5	49	22	+27	61	
4	Khimik Svetlogorsk	28	17	6	5	56	24	+32	57	
5	Torpedo-Kadino Mogilev	28	14	4	10	29	29	0	46	
6	Granit Mikashevichi	28	13	5	10	47	26	+21	44	
7	ZLiN Gomel	28	9	8	11	35	36	−1	35	
8	Keramik Bereza	28	9	7	12	34	39	−5	34 (Note: Keramik Bereza placed above Lida by overall goal difference, having an equal head-to-head record (0–0, 1–1).)	
9	Lida	28	9	7	12	27	33	−6	34	
10	Kommunalnik Slonim	28	9	5	14	33	42	−9	32	
11	Svisloch Osipovichi	28	9	4	15	34	59	−25	31	
12	Orsha (R)	28	9	1	18	40	74	−34	28	Withdrew to amateur league
13	Dinamo-Juni Minsk	28	6	7	15	19	39	−20	25	
14	Neman Mosty	28	5	4	19	21	57	−36	19	
15	Rogachev-DUSSh-1	28	3	8	17	27	67	−40	17	

Source: rsssf.com
Rules for classification: 1st points; 2nd matches won; 3rd head-to-head (points, matches won, goal difference, goals scored); 4th goal difference; 5th goals scored
(P) Promoted; (R) Relegated

== Top goalscorers ==
Rank	Goalscorer	Team	Goals
1	(Belarus) Maksim Sukhoveyev	Zvezda-VA-BGU Minsk	28
2	(Belarus) Sergey Shevchik	Torpedo Zhodino	21
3	(Belarus) Ashot Bagiryan	Zvezda-VA-BGU Minsk	14
4	(Belarus) Yuriy Nikitochkin	Svisloch Osipovichi	13
4	(Belarus) Oleg Kuzmenok	Darida Minsk Raion	13
4	(Belarus) Sergey Ulezlo	Khimik Svetlogorsk	13

== See also ==
- 2001 Belarusian Premier League
- 2000–01 Belarusian Cup
- 2001–02 Belarusian Cup
