= 2004 UEFA European Under-21 Championship squads =

Football team member listings

Players in bold have now been capped at full International level.

== Group A ==
=== Belarus ===
Head coach: (Belarus) Yuri Puntus

No.	Pos.	Player	Date of birth (age)	Caps	Club
1	GK	**Yuri Zhevnov**	17 April 1981		(Belarus) BATE Borisov
2	DF	Valery Tarasenka	1 September 1981		(Belarus) BATE Borisov
3	DF	**Dmitry Molosh**	10 December 1981		(Belarus) BATE Borisov
4	MF	**Dzyanis Sashcheka**	3 October 1981		(Belarus) Torpedo Zhodino
5	DF	Alyaksey Baha	4 February 1981		(Belarus) BATE Borisov
6	DF	**Alyaksey Pankavets**	18 April 1981		(Belarus) Gomel
7	MF	**Alyaksey Suchkow**	10 June 1981		(Russia) Shinnik Yaroslavl
8	FW	**Sergei Kornilenko**	14 June 1983		(Ukraine) Dynamo Kyiv
9	FW	**Vyacheslav Hleb**	12 February 1983		(Germany) Hamburger SV
10	MF	**Alexander Hleb**	1 May 1981		(Germany) VfB Stuttgart
11	MF	**Tsimafey Kalachow**	1 May 1981		(Ukraine) Illychivets Mariupol
12	GK	**Yury Tsyhalka**	27 May 1983		(Belarus) Dinamo Minsk
13	MF	Viktor Sokol	9 May 1981		(Belarus) Dinamo Minsk
14	FW	**Artem Kontsevoy**	20 May 1983		(Russia) Chernomorets Novorossiysk
15	MF	**Ihar Razhkow**	24 June 1981		(Belarus) Dinamo Minsk
16	MF	Pavel Shmigero	1 March 1982		(Belarus) BATE Borisov
17	FW	**Maksim Tsyhalka**	27 May 1983		(Belarus) Dinamo Minsk
18	FW	Pavel Byahanski	9 January 1981		(Belarus) BATE Borisov
19	DF	**Raman Kirenkin**	20 February 1981		(Belarus) Naftan Novopolotsk
20	DF	**Pavel Kirylchyk**	4 January 1981		(Ukraine) Kryvbas Kryvyi Rih
21	MF	**Aleh Shkabara**	15 February 1983		(Belarus) BATE Borisov
22	GK	Igor Logvinov	23 August 1983		(Belarus) Zvezda-BGU Minsk

=== Croatia ===
Head coach: (Croatia) Martin Novoselac

No.	Pos.	Player	Date of birth (age)	Caps	Club
1	GK	Tomislav Vranjić	12 February 1983		(Croatia) Cibalia
2	DF	**Marijan Buljat**	12 September 1981		(Croatia) Osijek
3	DF	Tomislav Mikulić	4 January 1982		(Croatia) Osijek
4	DF	**Dino Drpić**	26 May 1981		(Croatia) Dinamo Zagreb
5	DF	Mario Lučić	29 March 1981		(Croatia) Cibalia
6	DF	**Vedran Ješe**	3 February 1981		(Croatia) NK Zagreb
7	DF	**Mario Carević**	29 March 1982		(Croatia) Hajduk Split
8	DF	**Darijo Srna**	1 May 1982		(Ukraine) Shakhtar Donetsk
9	FW	Goran Ljubojević	4 May 1983		(Croatia) Osijek
10	MF	**Marko Babić**	28 January 1981		(Germany) Bayer Leverkusen
11	DF	Dario Bodrušić	25 January 1983		(Croatia) Inter Zaprešić
12	GK	Marko Šarlija	31 January 1982		(Croatia) Dinamo Zagreb
13	DF	Igor Gal	20 January 1983		(Croatia) Slaven Belupo
14	MF	Josip Milardović	10 January 1982		(Croatia) Osijek
15	MF	**Siniša Linić**	4 March 1983		(Croatia) Rijeka
16	MF	**Nikola Šafarić**	11 March 1981		(Croatia) Varteks
17	FW	Domagoj Abramović	1 April 1981		(Bosnia and Herzegovina) Široki Brijeg
18	FW	Dario Zahora	21 March 1982		(Croatia) Dinamo Zagreb
19	MF	**Niko Kranjčar**	13 August 1984		(Croatia) Dinamo Zagreb
20	DF	**Danijel Pranjić**	2 December 1981		(Croatia) Osijek
21	FW	**Eduardo**	25 February 1983		(Croatia) Dinamo Zagreb
22	GK	Tomislav Pelin	26 March 1981		(Croatia) Dinamo Zagreb

=== Italy ===
Head coach: (Italy) Claudio Gentile

No.	Pos.	Player	Date of birth (age)	Caps	Club
1	GK	**Marco Amelia**	2 April 1982		(Italy) Livorno
2	DF	**Cristian Zaccardo**	21 December 1981		(Italy) Bologna
3	DF	**Emiliano Moretti**	11 June 1981		(Italy) Parma
4	DF	**Alessandro Gamberini**	27 August 1981		(Italy) Bologna
5	DF	**Daniele Bonera**	31 May 1981		(Italy) Parma
6	MF	**Daniele De Rossi**	24 July 1983		(Italy) Roma
7	MF	**Giampiero Pinzi**	11 March 1981		(Italy) Udinese
8	MF	**Angelo Palombo**	25 September 1981		(Italy) Sampdoria
9	FW	**Alberto Gilardino**	5 July 1982		(Italy) Parma
10	MF	**Matteo Brighi** (c)	14 February 1981		(Italy) Juventus
11	FW	Giuseppe Sculli	23 March 1981		(Italy) Chievo
12	GK	Federico Agliardi	11 February 1983		(Italy) Brescia
13	DF	**Andrea Barzagli**	8 May 1981		(Italy) Chievo
14	DF	Cesare Bovo	1 December 1983		(Italy) Roma
15	MF	Marco Donadel	21 April 1983		(Italy) Milan
16	DF	Alessandro Potenza	8 March 1984		(Italy) Internazionale
17	MF	**Giandomenico Mesto**	25 May 1982		(Italy) Reggina
18	MF	**Alessandro Rosina**	31 January 1984		(Italy) Parma
19	MF	Simone Del Nero	4 April 1981		(Italy) Brescia
20	FW	**Andrea Caracciolo**	18 September 1981		(Italy) Brescia
21	MF	**Gaetano D'Agostino**	3 June 1982		(Italy) Roma
22	GK	Carlo Zotti	3 September 1982		(Italy) Roma

=== Serbia and Montenegro ===
Head coach: (Serbia and Montenegro) Vladimir Petrović

No.	Pos.	Player	Date of birth (age)	Caps	Club
1	GK	Nikola Milojević	16 April 1981		(Serbia and Montenegro) Hajduk Kula
2	MF	Dragan Stančić	12 February 1982		(Serbia and Montenegro) OFK Beograd
3	DF	Nikola Mijailović	15 February 1982		(Poland) Wisła Kraków
4	MF	**Miloš Krasić**	1 November 1984		(Serbia and Montenegro) Vojvodina
5	DF	**Đorđe Jokić**	20 January 1981		(Serbia and Montenegro) OFK Beograd
6	DF	**Marko Baša**	29 December 1982		(Serbia and Montenegro) OFK Beograd
7	FW	**Danko Lazović**	17 May 1983		(Netherlands) Feyenoord
8	MF	**Goran Lovre**	23 March 1982		(Belgium) Anderlecht
9	FW	**Andrija Delibašić**	24 April 1981		(Spain) Mallorca
10	MF	**Miloš Marić**	3 March 1982		(Serbia and Montenegro) Zeta
11	MF	Igor Matić	22 June 1981		(Serbia and Montenegro) OFK Beograd
12	GK	**Vladimir Stojković**	29 July 1983		(Serbia and Montenegro) Zemun
13	DF	**Bojan Neziri**	26 February 1982		(Ukraine) Metalurh Donetsk
14	DF	Bojan Miladinović	24 April 1982		(Serbia and Montenegro) Red Star Belgrade
15	FW	**Dejan Milovanović**	21 January 1984		(Serbia and Montenegro) Red Star Belgrade
16	DF	**Milan Biševac**	31 August 1983		(Serbia and Montenegro) Železnik
17	FW	**Simon Vukčević**	29 January 1986		(Serbia and Montenegro) Partizan
18	MF	Branimir Petrović	26 June 1982		(Serbia and Montenegro) Zeta
19	DF	**Branislav Ivanović**	22 February 1984		(Serbia and Montenegro) OFK Beograd
20	FW	**Boško Janković**	3 January 1984		(Serbia and Montenegro) Red Star Belgrade
21	FW	**Radomir Đalović**	28 October 1983		(Croatia) NK Zagreb
22	GK	**Vladimir Dišljenković**	2 July 1981		(Serbia and Montenegro) Red Star Belgrade

== Group B ==
=== Germany ===
Head coach: (Germany) Uli Stielike

No.	Pos.	Player	Date of birth (age)	Caps	Club
1	GK	**Tim Wiese**	17 December 1981		(Germany) 1. FC Kaiserslautern
2	DF	Moritz Volz	21 January 1983		(England) Fulham
3	MF	Giuseppe Gemiti	3 May 1981		(Italy) Genoa
4	DF	**Malik Fathi**	19 October 1983		(Germany) Hertha BSC
5	DF	Maik Franz	5 August 1981		(Germany) VfL Wolfsburg
6	MF	**Thomas Hitzlsperger**	5 April 1982		(England) Aston Villa
7	DF	**Andreas Görlitz**	31 January 1982		(Germany) 1860 Munich
8	MF	**Hanno Balitsch** (c)	2 January 1981		(Germany) Bayer Leverkusen
9	FW	Benjamin Auer	11 January 1981		(Germany) Mainz 05
10	FW	**Lukas Podolski**	4 June 1985		(Germany) 1. FC Köln
11	FW	**Mike Hanke**	5 November 1983		(Germany) Schalke 04
12	GK	Timo Ochs	17 October 1981		(Germany) VfL Osnabrück
13	MF	**Bastian Schweinsteiger**	1 August 1984		(Germany) Bayern Munich
14	MF	**David Odonkor**	21 February 1984		(Germany) Borussia Dortmund
15	MF	Markus Feulner	12 February 1982		(Germany) 1. FC Köln
16	MF	Christoph Preuß	4 July 1981		(Germany) Eintracht Frankfurt
17	DF	**Alexander Madlung**	11 July 1982		(Germany) Hertha BSC
18	MF	**Sascha Riether**	23 March 1983		(Germany) SC Freiburg
19	FW	Mimoun Azaouagh	17 November 1982		(Germany) Mainz 05
20	FW	Christian Tiffert	18 February 1982		(Germany) VfB Stuttgart
21	DF	**Robert Huth**	16 August 1984		(England) Chelsea
22	GK	Michael Rensing	4 May 1984		(Germany) Bayern Munich

=== Portugal ===
Head coach: (Portugal) José Romão

No.	Pos.	Player	Date of birth (age)	Caps	Club
1	GK	**José Moreira**	20 March 1982		(Portugal) Benfica
2	DF	Mário Sérgio	28 July 1981		(Portugal) Sporting CP
3	DF	**Bruno Alves**	27 November 1981		(Portugal) Porto
4	MF	**Raul Meireles**	17 March 1983		(Portugal) Porto
5	DF	**Ricardo Costa**	16 May 1981		(Portugal) Porto
6	DF	**José Bosingwa**	24 August 1982		(Portugal) Porto
7	FW	Pedro Oliveira	30 November 1981		(Portugal) Porto
8	MF	**Hugo Viana**	15 January 1983		(England) Newcastle United
9	FW	**Hugo Almeida**	23 May 1984		(Portugal) Porto
10	MF	**Carlos Martins**	29 April 1982		(Portugal) Sporting CP
11	DF	**Jorge Ribeiro** (c)	9 November 1981		(Portugal) Benfica
12	GK	**Bruno Vale**	8 April 1983		(Portugal) Porto
13	DF	Pedro Ribeiro	25 January 1983		(Portugal) Porto
14	DF	João Paulo	6 June 1981		(Portugal) União de Leiria
15	DF	Miguel Garcia	4 February 1983		(Portugal) Sporting CP
16	MF	**João Pereira**	25 February 1984		(Portugal) Benfica
17	MF	Bruno Aguiar	23 February 1981		(Portugal) Benfica
18	MF	**Custódio**	25 May 1983		(Portugal) Sporting CP
19	FW	Carlitos	6 September 1982		(Portugal) Benfica
20	FW	**Danny**	7 August 1983		(Portugal) Sporting CP
21	FW	Lourenço	5 June 1983		(Portugal) Sporting CP
22	GK	**Beto**	1 May 1982		(Portugal) Sporting CP

=== Sweden ===
Head Coach : (Sweden) Torbjörn Nilsson

No.	Pos.	Player	Date of birth (age)	Caps	Goals	Club
1	GK	**John Alvbåge**	10 August 1982			(Sweden) Örebro
2	DF	**Mikael Antonsson**	31 May 1981			(Sweden) IFK Göteborg
3	DF	**Mikael Dorsin**	10 June 1981			(France) Strasbourg
4	DF	Dennis Melander	1 January 1983			(Sweden) Trelleborg
5	DF	**Per Nilsson**	15 September 1982			(Sweden) AIK
6	DF	**Fredrik Stenman**	2 June 1983			(Sweden) Djurgården
7	MF	**Stefan Ishizaki**	15 May 1982			(Sweden) AIK
8	MF	**Samuel Holmén**	28 June 1984			(Sweden) Elfsborg
9	FW	**Johan Elmander**	27 May 1981			(Netherlands) Feyenoord
10	MF	**Alexander Farnerud**	1 May 1984			(France) Strasbourg
11	MF	**Andreas Johansson**	10 March 1982			(Sweden) Halmstad
12	GK	**Johan Wiland**	24 January 1981			(Sweden) Elfsborg
13	MF	Jon Jönsson	8 July 1983			(Sweden) Malmö FF
14	MF	Babis Stefanidis	8 March 1981			(Sweden) Djurgården
15	MF	Johan Andersson	22 August 1983			(Sweden) Landskrona BoIS
16	DF	Christian Järdler	3 June 1982			(Sweden) Helsingborg
17	MF	**Tobias Hysén**	9 March 1982			(Sweden) Djurgården
18	DF	Patrik Gerrbrand	27 April 1981			(Sweden) Hammarby
19	FW	**Lasse Nilsson**	3 January 1982			(Sweden) Elfsborg
20	FW	**Markus Rosenberg**	27 September 1982			(Sweden) Malmö FF
21	MF	**Dusan Djurić**	16 September 1984			(Sweden) Halmstad
22	GK	**Jonas Sandqvist**	6 May 1981			(Sweden) Landskrona BoIS

=== Switzerland ===
Head coach: (Switzerland) Bernard Challandes

No.	Pos.	Player	Date of birth (age)	Caps	Club
1	GK	**Marco Wölfli**	22 August 1982		(Switzerland) Young Boys
2	MF	**Philipp Degen**	15 February 1983		(Switzerland) Basel
3	DF	Kim Jaggy	14 November 1982		(Switzerland) Grasshopper
4	DF	**Philippe Senderos**	14 February 1985		(England) Arsenal
5	DF	**Mario Eggimann**	24 January 1981		(Germany) Karlsruher SC
6	DF	**Alain Rochat**	1 February 1983		(Switzerland) Young Boys
7	MF	**Stephan Lichtsteiner**	16 January 1984		(Switzerland) Grasshopper
8	MF	**Tranquillo Barnetta**	22 May 1985		(Switzerland) St. Gallen
9	MF	Rijat Shala	26 July 1983		(Switzerland) Grasshopper
10	MF	**Davide Chiumiento**	22 November 1984		(Italy) Juventus
11	FW	**Johan Vonlanthen**	1 February 1986		(Netherlands) PSV
12	GK	**Diego Benaglio**	8 September 1983		(Germany) VfB Stuttgart
13	MF	Pascal Cerrone	12 June 1981		(Switzerland) Thun
14	DF	**Alain Nef**	6 February 1982		(Switzerland) Zürich
15	DF	Philippe Montandon	15 July 1982		(Switzerland) Wil
16	MF	Davide Calla	10 February 1984		(Switzerland) Wil
17	FW	Thierno Bah	5 October 1982		(Switzerland) Schaffhausen
18	MF	Baykal Kulaksızoğlu	12 May 1983		(Switzerland) Thun
19	MF	Patrick Baumann	8 January 1982		(Switzerland) Thun
20	MF	Fabrizio Zambrella	1 March 1986		(Switzerland) Schaffhausen
21	FW	**David Degen**	15 February 1983		(Switzerland) Basel
22	GK	Alain Portmann	14 February 1981		(Switzerland) Yverdon
