= Vodovozov =

- Language: Slavic

Origin
- Meaning: "son of a water-carrier"
- Region of origin: Slavic World

Vodovozov (Russian: Водовозов), or Vodovozova (feminine form), is a Russian surname and may refer to:

- Elizaveta Vodovozova (1844–1923), Russian children's writer, educational theorist and memoirist
- Vasily Vodovozov (1825–1926), Russian children's writer, poet, pedagogue, educational theorist
- Yury Vodovozov (born 1982), retired Belarusian professional footballer
