= 2000 Belarusian First League =

Belarusian First League
- Season: 2000
- Champions: Molodechno
- Promoted: Molodechno
- Relegated: Traktor Minsk; Veino-Dnepr; Polesye Kozenki
- Matches: 240
- Goals: 704 (2.93 per match)

2000 Belarusian First League was the tenth season of 2nd level football championship in Belarus. It started in April and ended in November 2000.

== Team changes from 1999 season ==
Two best teams of 1999 Belarusian First League (Kommunalnik Slonim and Vedrich-97 Rechitsa) were promoted to Belarusian Premier League. They were replaced by two lowest placed teams of 1999 Premier League (Molodechno and Svisloch-Krovlya Osipovichi).

Two lowest placed teams of the 1999 First League (Pinsk-900 and Vitbich-Dinamo-Energo Vitebsk) relegated to the Second League. They were replaced by two newcomers from the Second League (Traktor Minsk and Luninets as the winners of their respective groups).

Before the start of the season Kommunalnik Svetlogorsk were renamed to Khimik Svetlogorsk.

== Overview ==
This season winners Molodechno were promoted to the Premier League. Four lowest placed teams (Traktor Minsk, Khimik Svetlogorsk, Veino-Dnepr and Polesye Kozenki) were initially relegated to the Second League, although Khimik Svetlogorsk later avoided relegation due to withdrawal of two other teams before 2001 season.

== Teams and locations ==
Location of teams in 1999 Belarusian First League

Team	Location	Position in 1999
Svisloch-Krovlya	Osipovichi	Premier League, 15
Molodechno	Molodechno	Premier League, 16
Dinamo-Juni	Minsk	3
Khimik	Svetlogorsk	4
Granit	Mikashevichi	5
Neman	Mosty	6
Torpedo	Zhodino	7
Keramik	Bereza	8
Orsha	Orsha	9
Rogachev	Rogachev	10
ZLiN	Gomel	11
Zvezda-VA-BGU	Minsk	12
Polesye	Kozenki	13
Veino-Dnepr	Veino	14
Traktor	Minsk	Second League, Group A, 1
Luninets	Luninets	Second League, Group B, 1

== League table ==
Pos	Team	Pld	W	D	L	GF	GA	GD	Pts	Promotion or relegation
1	Molodechno (P)	30	23	5	2	76	16	+60	74	Promotion to Belarusian Premier League
2	Luninets	30	18	8	4	51	18	+33	62	
3	Neman Mosty	30	17	4	9	57	30	+27	55	
4	Zvezda-VA-BGU Minsk	30	15	7	8	47	35	+12	52	
5	Granit Mikashevichi	30	15	4	11	46	40	+6	49	
6	Keramik Bereza	30	14	6	10	59	42	+17	48	
7	Torpedo Zhodino	30	13	6	11	44	36	+8	45	
8	Svisloch-Krovlya Osipovichi	30	13	5	12	40	39	+1	44	
9	Orsha	30	12	8	10	48	44	+4	44	
10	Rogachev	30	10	11	9	40	43	−3	41	
11	Dinamo-Juni Minsk	30	11	5	14	44	47	−3	38	
12	ZLiN Gomel	30	10	8	12	30	25	+5	38	
13	Traktor Minsk (R)	30	10	7	13	43	41	+2	37	Relegation to Belarusian Second League
14	Khimik Svetlogorsk	30	9	9	12	40	43	−3	36	
15	Veino-Dnepr Mogilev Raion (R)	30	2	2	26	25	83	−58	8	Relegation to Belarusian Second League
16	Polesye Kozenki (R)	30	0	1	29	14	122	−108	1	Relegation to Belarusian Second League

Source: rsssf.com
Rules for classification: 1st points; 2nd matches won; 3rd head-to-head (points, matches won, goal difference, goals scored); 4th goal difference; 5th goals scored
(P) Promoted; (R) Relegated

== Top goalscorers ==
Rank	Goalscorer	Team	Goals
1	(Belarus) Vadzim Boyka	Keramik Bereza	19
2	(Belarus) Nikolay Kurilovich	Keramik Bereza	17
3	(Belarus) Vladimir Taran	Torpedo Zhodino	15
4	(Belarus) Vladimir Provalinskiy	Orsha	14
4	(Belarus) Maksim Tsyhalka	Dinamo-Juni Minsk	14

== See also ==
- 2000 Belarusian Premier League
- 1999–2000 Belarusian Cup
- 2000–01 Belarusian Cup
