= Yegor Azyava =

Belarusian and Russian footballer

Personal information
- Full name: Yegor Vladimirovich Azyava
- Date of birth: 7 March 1983 (age 43)
- Place of birth: Minsk, Belarusian SSR
- Height: 1.88 m (6 ft 2 in)
- Position: Defender

Senior career*
Years	Team	Apps	(Gls)
2000	Traktor Minsk	4	(0)
2001–2002	Lokomotiv Minsk	20	(3)
2002	Molodechno-2000	12	(0)
2003	Lida	19	(3)
2004–2005	Osipovichi	34	(11)
2005	Livadiya Dzerzhinsk	54	(2)
2006	Belshina Bobruisk	16	(0)
2007–2008	Sakhalin Yuzhno-Sakhalinsk	54	(2)
2009–2010	Veras Nesvizh	44	(0)
2011–2012	Sakhalin Yuzhno-Sakhalinsk	13	(0)
- * Club domestic league appearances and goals

Yegor Vladimirovich Azyava (Russian: Егор Владимирович Азява; born 8 March 1983) is a former Belarusian and Russian football defender.

== Club career ==
He was born and started his career in Belarus. He moved to Sakhalin in 2007 and later accepted Russian citizenship.
