= Kotlyarov =

Kotlyarov (Russian: Котляров, feminine: Kotlyarova) is a Russian-language surname, a patronymic derivation from the occupation kotlyar, tinker/tinsmith, similar to the surname Calderon. The surname may refer to the following notable people:

- Aleksandr Kotlyarov (born 1983), Russian football player
- Alyaksandr Katlyaraw (born 1993), Belarusian football player
- Aleksandra Kotlyarova (born 1988), Uzbekistani triple jumper
- Aleksei Kotlyarov (born 1989), Russian football player
- Nadezhda Kotlyarova (born 1989), Russian sprinter
- Olga Kotlyarova (born 1976), Russian runner
- Yaroslav Kotlyarov (born 1997), Ukrainian football player
