= Andrei Viktorovich =

Russian footballer

Personal information
- Full name: Andrei Aleksandrovich Viktorovich
- Date of birth: 28 January 1963 (age 63)
- Place of birth: Minsk, Byelorussian SSR, Soviet Union (now Belarus)
- Height: 1.82 m (5 ft 11 1/2 in)
- Position: Goalkeeper

Senior career*
Years	Team	Apps	(Gls)
1984–1985	Traktor Minsk		
1989	FC Sputnik Minsk		
1989–1991	Tselinnik Tselinograd	71	(0)
1992–1996	Luch Vladivostok	160	(0)
1997–1998	Irtysh Omsk	6	(0)
1998–1999	Luch Vladivostok	48	(0)

Managerial career
- 2000: Luninets (gk coach)
- 2001–2002: Torpedo Zhodino (gk coach)
- 2003: Zvezda-VA-BGU Minsk (gk coach)
- 2004–2007: BATE Borisov (gk coach)
- 2008–2011: Dinamo Minsk (gk coach)
- 2012: Bereza-2010 (gk coach)
- 2013–2017: Torpedo-BelAZ Zhodino (gk coach)
- 2019–: Torpedo-BelAZ Zhodino (gk coach)
- * Club domestic league appearances and goals

Andrei Aleksandrovich Viktorovich (Russian: Андрей Александрович Викторович; born 28 January 1963) is a former Belarusian football player.

In 1996, he played one game for FC Luch Vladivostok as a field (non-goalkeeper) player.
