= Viktorovich =

Viktorovich (Russian: Викторович) is a patronymic surname, derived from the given name Viktor (Victor); not to be condused with the patronymic part of the full East Slavic name. Notable people with this name include:

- Andrei Viktorovich (born 1963) is a former Belarusian football player.
- Vladimir Viktorovich (born 1950) is a Soviet and Russian philologist, literary scholar, and professor
