= Dmitry Lentsevich =

Belarusian footballer

Personal information
- Full name: Dmitry Valdomarovich Lentsevich
- Date of birth: 20 June 1983 (age 43)
- Place of birth: Lida, Belarusian SSR, Soviet Union
- Height: 1.92 m (6 ft 3 1/2 in)
- Position: Defender

Youth career
- 1999–2001: RUOR Minsk

Senior career*
Years	Team	Apps	(Gls)
1999–2001	RUOR Minsk	46	(3)
2002–2005	Dinamo Minsk	48	(5)
2003	→ Dinamo-Juni Minsk	15	(0)
2006–2007	Torpedo Moscow	22	(0)
2007	Dnipro Dnipropetrovsk	0	(0)
2008–2013	Bohemians Prague	62	(0)
2010	→ České Budějovice (loan)	9	(0)
2014	Minsk	14	(2)

International career
2004–2005	Belarus U21	13	(0)
2006–2010	Belarus	15	(0)

Managerial career
- 2020–2021: Dinamo Minsk (assistant)
- 2022–2024: Dinamo Minsk (reserves)
- 2024–2025: Dinamo-2 Minsk
- 2025–2026: Torpedo-BelAZ Zhodino
- * Club domestic league appearances and goals

Dmitry Valdomarovich Lentsevich (Russian: Дмитрий Вальдомарович Ленцевич; born 20 June 1983) is a Belarusian football coach and a former player.

His brother Alyaksandr Lyantsevich is also a former professional footballer.

== Career ==
Lentsevich joined Bohemians Prague on a free transfer from FC Dnipro Dnipropetrovsk in January 2008. He had previously made 20 appearances for FC Torpedo Moscow in the Russian Premier League and Russian First Division.

== Honours ==
Dinamo Minsk

- Belarusian Premier League champion: 2004
