= Aleksandr Lisovsky =

Belarusian footballer

Personal information
- Full name: Aleksandr Petrovich Lisovsky
- Date of birth: 29 April 1975 (age 51)
- Place of birth: Minsk, Belarusian SSR
- Height: 1.76 m (5 ft 9 in)
- Position: Midfielder

Senior career*
| Years | Team | Apps | (Gls) |
| 1992–1993 | Ataka-407 Minsk | 17 | (2) |
| 1993 | Molodechno | 2 | (0) |
| 1993–1997 | Ataka Minsk | 118 | (30) |
| 1998–2002 | BATE Borisov | 81 | (19) |
| 2002–2004 | Torpedo Zhodino | 52 | (3) |
| 2005 | Smorgon | 27 | (1) |

International career
| 1996–1997 | Belarus U21 | 9 | (2) |
| 1996 | Belarus | 2 | (0) |

Managerial career
- 2006–2008: Smorgon (assistant)
- 2008–2009: Smorgon
- 2010: Torpedo Zhodino (assistant)
- 2010: Torpedo Zhodino (caretaker)
- 2011–2017: BATE Borisov (youth/reserves)
- 2018: Smolevichi (assistant)
- 2018–2020: BATE Borisov (assistant)
- 2020: BATE Borisov
- 2021: BATE Borisov (assistant)
- 2022: Gomel (assistant)
- 2023: BATE Borisov (assistant)
- 2024: Shakhtyor Soligorsk (assistant)
- 2025: Belshina Bobruisk (assistant)
- 2025–2026: Belshina Bobruisk
- * Club domestic league appearances and goals

Aleksandr Petrovich Lisovsky (Belarusian: Аляксандр Пятровіч Лісоўскі; Russian: Александр Петрович Лисовский; born 29 April 1975) is a Belarusian association football coach and former player.

== Career ==
Lisovsky started his career with Ataka-407 Minsk.

== Honours ==
BATE Borisov

- Belarusian Premier League champion: 1999, 2002

== Personal life ==
His son Roman Lisovskiy is also a professional footballer.
