= Pavel Shmigero =

Belarusian footballer and coach

Personal information
- Date of birth: 3 January 1982 (age 44)
- Place of birth: Lida, Belarus
- Height: 1.80 m (5 ft 11 in)
- Position: Midfielder

Team information
- Current team: BATE Borisov (youth coach)

Youth career
- Lida

Senior career*
Years	Team	Apps	(Gls)
1998–1999	Lida	28	(0)
2000–2001	Torpedo-MAZ Minsk	36	(0)
2002–2005	BATE Borisov	78	(13)
2006	Shakhtyor Soligorsk	5	(0)
2006–2008	Lokomotiv Minsk	51	(1)
2009	Belshina Bobruisk	15	(0)
2010	Granit Mikashevichi	10	(0)
2010–2012	SKVICH Minsk	45	(2)
2013–2015	Smorgon	61	(1)

International career
1999–2000	Belarus U19	5	(0)
2002–2004	Belarus U21	13	(0)
- * Club domestic league appearances and goals

Pavel Shmigero (Belarusian: Павел Шмігера; Russian: Павел Шмигеро; born 3 January 1982) is a Belarusian football coach and former player. He currently works as a youth coach at BATE Borisov. He was a member of Belarusian squad at 2004 UEFA European Under-21 Championship.

== Career ==
=== Coaching career ===
In February 2016, Shmigero returned to BATE Borisov as a youth coach. Two years later, he also joined the coaching staff of Torpedo Minsk. As of June 2019, he was still working as a youth coach for BATE Borisov.

== Honours ==
BATE Borisov

- Belarusian Premier League champion: 2002
- Belarusian Cup winner: 2005–06
