= Yury Vodovozov =

Belarusian footballer (born 1982)

Personal information
- Date of birth: 19 January 1982 (age 44)
- Position: Midfielder

Team information
- Current team: Smolevichi-STI (assistant coach)

Youth career
- 2000–2002: Dinamo Minsk

Senior career*
| Years | Team | Apps | (Gls) |
| 2000–2003 | Dinamo Minsk | 19 | (1) |
| 2000–2002 | → Dinamo-Juni Minsk | 36 | (4) |
| 2003 | → Naftan Novopolotsk (loan) | 2 | (0) |
| 2004 | Lokomotiv Vitebsk | 26 | (3) |
| 2005 | Slavia Mozyr | 18 | (0) |
| 2006 | Lokomotiv Vitebsk | 2 | (0) |
| 2006 | Smorgon | 13 | (1) |
| 2007–2008 | Lokomotiv Minsk | 42 | (2) |
| 2009–2010 | DSK Gomel | 33 | (3) |
| 2011 | SKVICH Minsk | 27 | (1) |

Managerial career
- 2012–2013: SKVICH Minsk (assistant)
- 2013–: Smolevichi-STI (assistant)
- * Club domestic league appearances and goals

Yury Vodovozov (Russian: Юрий Водовозов; born 19 January 1982) is a retired Belarusian professional footballer.

== Career ==
Vodovozov started his career as a trainee at Dinamo Minsk in 2000, with a loan spell at Naftan Novopolotsk in 2003 followed by a permanent move in 2004 to Lokomotiv-96 Vitebsk. He only stayed there for one season, joining Belarus' top division side Slavia Mozyr in 2005.

Vodovozov played for first division side FC DSK Gomel during the 2009 and 2010 seasons, helping the club reach the semi-finals of the 2009–10 Belarusian Cup.

== Honours ==
Dinamo Minsk

- Belarusian Cup winner: 2002–03
