= Yawhen Linyow =

Belarusian footballer

Personal information
- Date of birth: 27 October 1980 (age 46)
- Place of birth: Minsk, Belarusian SSR
- Height: 1.88 m (6 ft 2 in)
- Position: Defender

Team information
- Current team: Kletsk (head coach)

Youth career
- 1998–1999: Torpedo-MAZ Minsk

Senior career*
Years	Team	Apps	(Gls)
1998	Real Minsk	4	(0)
1999–2002	Torpedo-MAZ Minsk	49	(2)
2003	Lokomotiv Minsk	13	(1)
2004	Metalurh Zaporizhya	14	(1)
2005	Lokomotiv Minsk	23	(4)
2006	Gomel	25	(0)
2006–2008	Tavriya Simferopol	2	(0)
2009	Gomel	26	(2)
2010–2011	SKVICH Minsk	28	(0)
2014	SKVICH Minsk	4	(0)

Managerial career
- 2013–2014: SKVICH Minsk
- 2015–: Kletsk
- * Club domestic league appearances and goals

Yawhen Wladzimiravich Linyow (Belarusian: Яўген Ўладзіміравіч Лінёў; Russian: Евгений Владимирович Линёв; born 27 October 1980) is a Belarusian professional football coach and former player. As of 2015, he is a manager for Kletsk.
