= Alyaksandr Lyantsevich =

Belarusian footballer

Personal information
- Date of birth: 2 May 1979 (age 47)
- Place of birth: Lida, Belarusian SSR
- Height: 1.91 m (6 ft 3 in)
- Position: Goalkeeper

Youth career
- 1999–2000: Lida

Senior career*
Years	Team	Apps	(Gls)
2000	Lida	27	(0)
2001–2002	Gomel	3	(0)
2003	Khimik Svetlogorsk	23	(0)
2004	Zvezda-BGU Minsk	11	(0)
2005–2007	Gomel	18	(0)
2007	Minsk	13	(0)
2008	Gomel	8	(0)
2009–2010	Minsk	11	(0)
2011	Dnepr Mogilev	7	(0)
2012	Lida	8	(0)

International career^{‡}
2000	Belarus U21	1	(0)
2008	Belarus	1	(0)
- * Club domestic league appearances and goals as of 1 January 2013 ‡ National team caps and goals as of December 2009

Alyaksandr Lyantsevich (Belarusian: Аляксандр Лянцэвіч; Russian: Александр Ленцевич; born 2 May 1979) is a retired Belarusian professional footballer.

His brother Dmitry Lentsevich is also a former professional footballer.

== Honours ==
Gomel

- Belarusian Cup winner: 2001–02
