= Sergey Mironchik =

Belarusian footballer

Personal information
- Date of birth: 7 August 1975 (age 51)
- Place of birth: Bobruisk, Byelorussian SSR, Soviet Union
- Height: 1.72 m (5 ft 8 in)
- Position: Midfielder

Youth career
- 1993–1994: Fandok Bobruisk

Senior career*
Years	Team	Apps	(Gls)
1993–1994	Fandok-2 Bobruisk	31	(3)
1995	KRZ Osipovichi	3	(0)
1997–1998	Rogachev	47	(0)
1999	Khimik Svetlogorsk	26	(9)
2000	Svisloch-Krovlya Osipovichi	29	(5)
2001–2004	BATE Borisov	21	(3)
2003	→ Naftan Novopolotsk (loan)	19	(3)
2004	→ Belshina Bobruisk (loan)	25	(0)
2005–2007	Khimik Svetlogorsk	74	(4)
2008	Belshina Bobruisk	19	(0)
2009	Osipovichi	34	(2)
2023	Torpeda Bobruisk	1	(0)

Managerial career
- 2011–2016: Belshina Bobruisk (youth/reserves)
- * Club domestic league appearances and goals

Sergey Mironchik (Belarusian: Сяргей Мірончык; Russian: Сергей Мирончик; born 7 August 1975) is a retired Belarusian football midfielder.

== Honours ==
BATE Borisov

- Belarusian Premier League champion: 2002
