= Narodnaya Shkola =

- Editor: Fyodor Mednikov; Vasily Yevtushevski; Alexander Pyatkovsky
- Frequency: Fortnightly
- Founded: 1869
- Final issue: 1889
- Country: Russian Empire
- Based in: Saint Petersburg
- Language: Russian

Narodnaya Shkola (Russian: Народная школа, School for the People) was a pedagogical fortnightly published in Saint Petersburg in 1869–1889. The journal's objective was providing the teachers, mostly in the Russian province, with the new methodological and theoretical materials, as well as keeping a general view on the state of school education in Imperial Russia. The magazine was edited first by Fyodor Mednikov (1869—1877), then by Vasily Yevtushevski and Alexander Pyatkovsky (1878—1882), then by Pyatkovsky alone. The best Russian practicing pedagogues and theoreticians contributed to Narodnaya Shkola, including Fyodor Rezener, Vasily Vodovozov, Vladimir von Boole, Nikolai Bunakov and Dmitry Semyonov.
