= Andrey Milewski =

Belarusian footballer

Personal information
- Full name: Andrey Milevskiy
- Date of birth: 9 January 1977 (age 49)
- Place of birth: Mozyr, Gomel Oblast, Belarusian SSR, Soviet Union
- Height: 1.86 m (6 ft 1 in)
- Position: Defender

Youth career
- DYuSSh-2 Molodechno

Senior career*
Years	Team	Apps	(Gls)
1995–1997	Torpedo Zhodino	42	(2)
1998–2002	Shakhtyor Soligorsk	89	(5)
2002–2004	Dinamo Minsk	21	(0)
2004	Darida Minsk Raion	8	(0)
2004	Inter Baku	10	(0)
2005–2006	Darida Minsk Raion	18	(1)
2006	Šiauliai	15	(0)
2007	Sūduva Marijampolė	4	(0)
2007–2008	Minsk	32	(0)
2009–2010	Gorodeya	56	(2)

International career
2000–2003	Belarus	7	(0)
- * Club domestic league appearances and goals

Andrey Milewski (Belarusian: Андрэй Мілеўскі; Russian: Андрей Милевский; born 9 January 1977) is a Belarusian former professional footballer.

== Career ==
Born in Mazyr, Milewski played professionally in the Belarusian Premier League with FC Shakhtyor Soligorsk, FC Dinamo Minsk, FC Darida Minsk Raion and FC Minsk.

Milewski made seven appearances for the Belarus national football team from 2000 to 2003.

== Honours ==
Dinamo Minsk

- Belarusian Premier League champion: 2004
- Belarusian Cup winner: 2002–03
