= Anton Rabtsaw =

Belarusian footballer

Personal information
- Date of birth: 19 February 1984 (age 42)
- Place of birth: Novolukoml, Belarusian SSR
- Height: 1.80 m (5 ft 11 in)
- Position: Defender

Youth career
- 2001–2004: Dinamo Minsk

Senior career*
Years	Team	Apps	(Gls)
2001–2004	Dinamo Minsk	10	(0)
2001	→ Dinamo-2 Minsk	24	(0)
2003–2004	→ Dinamo-Juni Minsk	29	(0)
2005–2008	Darida Minsk Raion	90	(1)
2009	Gomel	10	(0)
2010	Rudensk	14	(0)
2010–2012	Torpedo-BelAZ Zhodino	55	(0)
2013–2014	Slutsk	54	(0)

International career
2002–2004	Belarus U21	6	(0)
- * Club domestic league appearances and goals as of 26 December 2015

Anton Rabtsaw (Belarusian: Антон Рабцаў; Russian: Антон Рябцев; born 19 February 1984) is a Belarusian former professional footballer.

== Honours ==
Dinamo Minsk

- Belarusian Premier League champion: 2004
- Belarusian Cup winner: 2002–03
