= Alyaksandr Mikhnavets =

Belarusian footballer

Personal information
- Date of birth: 24 November 1982 (age 43)
- Position: Midfielder

Youth career
- 1999–2001: RUOR Minsk

Senior career*
| Years | Team | Apps | (Gls) |
| 1999–2001 | RUOR Minsk | 42 | (8) |
| 2000 | → Akadem-Slavia Minsk (loan) | 7 | (0) |
| 2002–2005 | Lokomotov Minsk | 91 | (6) |
| 2003 | → Lida (loan) | 14 | (1) |
| 2006–2009 | Minsk | 80 | (3) |
| 2009 | → Belshina Bobruisk (loan) | 13 | (3) |
| 2010 | Granit Mikashevichi | 30 | (1) |
| 2011–2012 | SKVICH Minsk | 51 | (7) |
| 2013 | Slutsk | 21 | (2) |
| 2014 | Isloch Minsk Raion | 5 | (0) |
| 2014 | Krumkachy Minsk | 14 | (5) |
| 2015 | Slonim | 14 | (0) |
- * Club domestic league appearances and goals

Alyaksandr Mikhnavets (Belarusian: Аляксандр Міхнавец; Russian: Александр Михновец; born 24 November 1982) is a Belarusian former professional footballer.
