= Vital Makawchyk =

Belarusian footballer

Personal information
- Date of birth: 20 September 1981 (age 45)
- Position: Goalkeeper

Senior career*
Years	Team	Apps	(Gls)
2000	Akadem-Slavia Minsk	30	(0)
2001–2003	Lokomotiv Minsk	83	(0)
2004	Metalurh Zaporizhzhia	0	(0)
2004	→ Metalurh-2 Zaporizhzhia	2	(0)
2004–2006	Lokomotiv Minsk	54	(0)
2006–2009	Shakhtyor Soligorsk	44	(0)
2010	DSK Gomel	12	(0)
2011–2013	SKVICH Minsk	63	(0)
2014–2015	Krumkachy Minsk	27	(0)
- * Club domestic league appearances and goals

Vital Makawchyk (Belarusian: Віталь Макаўчык; Russian: Виталий Макавчик; born 20 September 1981) is a retired Belarusian professional footballer.

Makawchyk's son Artem is also a professional football goalkeeper who plays for Dinamo Minsk.
