= Artyom Makavchik =

Belarusian footballer

Personal information
- Full name: Artyom Vitalyevich Makavchik
- Date of birth: 14 July 2000 (age 26)
- Place of birth: Minsk, Belarus
- Height: 1.93 m (6 ft 4 in)
- Position: Goalkeeper

Senior career*
Years	Team	Apps	(Gls)
2017–2019	Torpedo Minsk	5	(0)
2019–2022	Energetik-BGU Minsk	46	(0)
2023–2025	Dinamo Minsk	2	(0)
2024	→ Slavia Mozyr (loan)	3	(0)

International career^{‡}
2021–2022	Belarus U21	8	(0)
- * Club domestic league appearances and goals as of 3 April 2026 ‡ National team caps and goals as of 8 June 2022

Artyom Vitalyevich Makavchik (Belarusian: Арцём Вітальевіч Макаўчык; Russian: Артём Витальевич Макавчик; born 14 July 2000) is a Belarusian professional footballer who plays as a goalkeeper.

Makavchik's father Vitaly Makavchik is also a former professional football goalkeeper.
