= Elizaveta Vodovozova =

Russian children's writer and educational theorist

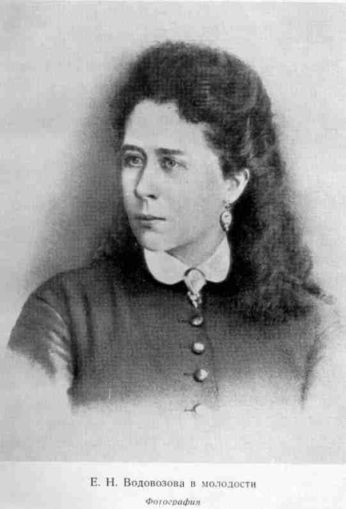
- Born: Elizaveta Nikolayevna Vodovozova; Елизавета Николаевна Водовозова; 17 August 1844; Porechye, Smolensk Governorate, Russian Empire
- Died: 3 March 1923 (aged 78); Petrograd, Soviet Union
- Occupations: writer, educational theorist, memoirist
- Spouse(s): Vasily Vodovozov; Vasily Semevsky

Elizaveta Nikolayevna Vodovozova (Russian: Елизаве́та Никола́евна Водово́зова, née Tsevlovskaya, Russian: Цевло́вская, 17 August 1844, Porechye, Smolensk Governorate, Russian Empire, — 23 March 1923, Petrograd, USSR) was a Russian children's writer, educational theorist and memoirist, the wife of Vasily Vodovozov.

== Biography ==
An 1862 Smolny Institute graduate, she started writing in 1863 on issues of women's emancipation and pedagogy for the magazines like Detskoye Chteniye and Narodnaya Shkola. Her debut publication, "What Stops a Woman from Becoming Independent?" (published by Biblioteka Dlya Chtenya in September 1863) came as a direct response to Nikolai Chernyshevsky's novel What Is to Be Done?.

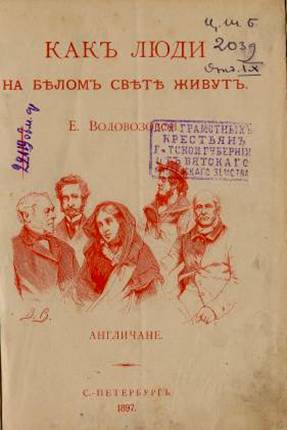
How People of Different Nations Live. The English, 1897, illustrated by Viktor Vasnetsov

Many of Vodovozova's ideas originated during an extensive trip over Belgium, Germany, England, Switzerland and France which she and her husband Vasily Ivanovich undertook soon after their marriage in April 1862, in order to investigate the theories of Friedrich Fröbel and how they worked in practice. Her influential book "Intellectual Development of Children" (Умственное развитие детей от первого появления сознания до восьмилетнего возраста, 1871) enjoyed seven re-issues in pre-1917 Russia. A strong proponent of the idea of the active use of music and games as educational and developmental means, she published a book Russian Folk Songs for One Voice and Active Games for Children (Одноголосые детские песни и подвижные игры с русскими народными мелодиями, 1876) as a supplement to her own educational program. Highly popular at the time were Vodovozova's children's stories. Many of them were collected in her books From Russian Life and Nature (Из русской жизни и природы, 1871—1872) and For Leisure (На отдых, 1880).

For decades Vodovozova's most important work was considered to be her magnum opus The Life of the Peoples of Europe. Narratives in Geography (Жизнь европейских народов. Географические рассказы, 1875—1883), reissued in ten volumes as "How People of Different Nations Live" (Как люди на белом свете живут, 1894—1901). In retrospect, though, the truly lasting part of her legacy proved to be her numerous memoirs and biographical sketches. Much lauded were her books Among the Petersburg Youth of the Sixties (Среди петербургской молодёжи шестидесятых годов, 1911) and Things Long Gone (Из давнопрошедшего, 1915). Vodovozova's best biographical and analytical works, including the essays on Konstantin Ushinsky, Vasily Sleptsov and Vasily Semevsky (her second husband whom she married in 1886, after Vodovozov's death), were collected in her two best-known books, At the Dawn of Life (На заре жизни, 1911) and Dreams and Reality (Грёзы и действительность, 1918).
