= Syarhey Khaletski =

Belarusian footballer

Personal information
- Date of birth: 14 April 1984 (age 42)
- Height: 1.74 m (5 ft 8 1/2 in)
- Position: Defender

Youth career
- 2000–2001: RUOR Minsk

Senior career*
| Years | Team | Apps | (Gls) |
| 2000–2001 | RUOR Minsk | 25 | (0) |
| 2001 | Torpedo-MAZ Minsk | 0 | (0) |
| 2002–2004 | Lokomotiv Minsk | 64 | (0) |
| 2005 | Smorgon | 9 | (0) |
| 2006–2008 | Neman Grodno | 34 | (0) |
| 2009 | Belcard Grodno | 10 | (0) |
| 2009 | Smorgon | 11 | (0) |
| 2010–2011 | Partizan Minsk | 53 | (0) |
| 2012–2013 | Slavia Mozyr | 45 | (0) |
| 2014 | Smorgon | 23 | (0) |
- * Club domestic league appearances and goals as of 18 December 2014

Syarhey Khaletski (Belarusian: Сяргей Халецкі; Russian: Серге́й Халецкий; born 14 April 1984) is a retired Belarusian professional football player. His latest club was Smorgon in 2014.
