= Mikalay Shvydakow =

Belarusian footballer

Personal information
- Date of birth: 6 July 1980 (age 46)
- Height: 1.76 m (5 ft 9 1/2 in)
- Position: Midfielder

Senior career*
Years	Team	Apps	(Gls)
1998–2001	Torpedo-MAZ Minsk	85	(13)
2002–2003	Metalist Kharkiv	14	(0)
2002	→ Metalist-2 Kharkiv	3	(0)
2003	→ Lokomotiv Minsk (loan)	8	(1)
2003	→ Naftan Novopolotsk (loan)	6	(0)
2004	Naftan Novopolotsk	1	(0)
2005–2008	Lokomotiv Minsk	89	(16)
2005	→ Shakhtyor Soligorsk (loan)	0	(0)
2009–2010	Torpedo Zhodino	27	(0)
2011–2012	SKVICH Minsk	13	(2)
2014	SKVICH Minsk	5	(1)

International career
1999–2001	Belarus U21	5	(1)
- * Club domestic league appearances and goals as of 10 December 2014

Mikalay Shvydakow (Belarusian: Мікалай Швыдакоў; Russian: Николай Швыдаков; born 6 July 1980) is a Belarusian former professional footballer.
