= FC Polesye Kozenki =

Polesye Kozenki
- Full name: Football Club Polesye Kozenki
- Founded: 1995
- Dissolved: 2008
- Ground: Kozenki, Mozyr Raion
- League: Belarusian Second League
- 2007: 12th

Polesye Kozenki is a defunct Belarusian football club based in the town of Kozenki, Mozyr Raion, Gomel Oblast.

== History ==
The team was founded in 1995 as Polesye Mozyr Raion and joined Belarusian Second League in 1995 fall season. After tree seasons spent in the Second League the team got promoted to the First League in 1998, but was relegated back a few seasons later.

Since 1999 Polesye changed their official name to Polesye Kozenki, though they had been playing in Kozenki from the beginning. After the end of 2007 season the club was disbanded due to financial troubles. In their last season (2007) the club was known as Polesye-2 Kozenki due to change in ownership.
