= Vital Valadzyankow =

Belarusian footballer

Personal information
- Date of birth: 25 April 1976 (age 50)
- Place of birth: Minsk, Belarusian SSR
- Height: 1.82 m (5 ft 11 1/2 in)
- Position: Midfielder

Youth career
- Dinamo Minsk

Senior career*
| Years | Team | Apps | (Gls) |
| 1993–1994 | Dinamo-Juni Minsk | | |
| 1994–2002 | Dinamo Minsk | 151 | (14) |
| 2002 | Sokol Saratov | 14 | (2) |
| 2003–2007 | Dinamo Minsk | 105 | (13) |
| 2007–2008 | Darida Minsk Raion | 19 | (5) |
| 2008–2009 | Naftan Novopolotsk | 22 | (1) |
| 2010 | Neman Grodno | 26 | (0) |
| 2011–2012 | Gorodeya | 53 | (7) |

International career
| 1996–1997 | Belarus U21 | 2 | (0) |
| 2001–2006 | Belarus | 10 | (0) |
- * Club domestic league appearances and goals as of 20 January 2013

Vital Valadzyankow (Belarusian: Віталь Валадзянкоў; Russian: Виталий Володенков; born 25 April 1976) is a retired Belarusian professional footballer.

== Career ==
Born in Minsk, Valadzyankow began playing football in FC Dinamo Minsk's youth system. He joined the senior team and made his Belarusian Premier League debut in 1995.

== Honours ==
Dinamo Minsk

- Belarusian Premier League champion: 1994–95, 1995, 1997, 2004
- Belarusian Cup winner: 2002–03

Naftan Novopolotsk

- Belarusian Cup winner: 2008–09
