= Ihor Chumachenko =

Belarusian professional footballer

Personal information
- Date of birth: 26 October 1976 (age 50)
- Place of birth: Artsyz, Odesa region, Ukrainian SSR
- Height: 1.82 m (5 ft 11 1/2 in)
- Position: Midfielder

Senior career*
Years	Team	Apps	(Gls)
1992–1993	Polihraftekhnika Oleksandria	15	(0)
1993	Prometei Dniprodzerzhynsk	1	(0)
1994	Vedrich Rechytsa	25	(1)
1995–1996	Dnepr Mogilev	29	(2)
1996–1997	Chornomorets Odesa	22	(1)
1998–2001	Dnepr-Transmash Mogilev	92	(28)
2001	Dinamo Minsk	19	(8)
2002–2003	BATE Borisov	34	(17)
2003–2004	Irtysh Pavlodar	18	(5)
2004–2007	Naftan Novopolotsk	83	(26)
2008–2009	Neman Grodno	50	(5)
2010	DSK Gomel	29	(4)
2011	Gorodeya	15	(3)

Managerial career
- 2011–2013: Dnepr Mogilev (assistant)
- 2013–2014: BATE Borisov (youth)
- 2014–2019: BATE Borisov (reserves)
- 2019: Torpedo Minsk (reserves)
- 2020–2021: Dnepr Mogilev
- 2021–2023: Orsha
- 2023–2025: Molodechno (assistant)
- 2025–2026: Bumprom Gomel
- * Club domestic league appearances and goals

Ihor Gavrilovich Chumachenko (Ukrainian: Ігор Гаврилович Чумаченко; Belarusian: Ігар Чумачэнка; Russian: Игорь Чумаченко; born 26 October 1976) is a Belarusian professional football coach and former player. Besides Belarus, he has played in Ukraine.

== Coaching career ==
On 15 January 2019, Chumachenko became coach of the FC Torpedo Minsk's reserve team.

== Honours ==
Dnepr-Transmash Mogilev

- Belarusian Premier League champion: 1998

BATE Borisov

- Belarusian Premier League champion: 2002

Irtysh Pavlodar

- Kazakhstan Premier League champion: 2003
