= 2002 Belarusian Premier League =

Belarusian Premier League
- Season: 2002
- Champions: BATE
- Relegated: Lokomotiv-96
- Champions League: BATE
- UEFA Cup: Dinamo Minsk; Neman
- Intertoto Cup: Shakhtyor
- Matches: 183
- Goals: 514 (2.81 per match)
- Top goalscorer: (Belarus) Valery Strypeykis (18)
- Biggest home win: BATE 6–0 Lokomotiv-96
- Biggest away win: Slavia 1–6 Belshina
- Highest scoring: Dinamo Minsk 6–3 Zvezda-VA-BGU; Dinamo Minsk 6–3 Slavia

The 2002 Belarusian Premier League was the 12th season of top-tier football in Belarus. It started on April 12 and ended on November 8, 2002. Belshina Bobruisk were the defending champions.

== Team changes from 2001 season ==
Teams finished on the last two places in 2001 – Naftan Novopolotsk and Vedrich-97 Rechytsa relegated to the First League. They were replaced by 2001 First League winners Torpedo Zhodino and the newcomers, First League runners-up Zvezda-VA-BGU Minsk. Neman-Belcard Grodno changed their name back to Neman Grodno.

== Overview ==
BATE Borisov and Neman Grodno finished the season with equal number of points and advanced to the Championship Play-Off. BATE won the play-off game and became the champions for the 2nd time. They qualified for the next season's Champions League. Neman Grodno and 2002–03 Cup winners Dinamo Minsk qualified for UEFA Cup. Due to Premiere League expansion from 14 to 16 teams starting with next season, only one lowest placed team (Lokomotiv-96 Vitebsk) have relegated.

== Teams and venues ==
Location of teams in 2002 Belarusian Premier League

Team	Location	Venue	Capacity	Position in 2001
Belshina	Bobruisk	Spartak Stadium (Bobruisk)	5,800	1
Dinamo Minsk	Minsk	Dinamo Stadium (Minsk)	40,000	2
BATE	Borisov	City Stadium (Borisov)	5,500	3
Neman	Grodno	Neman Stadium	14,000	4
Shakhtyor	Soligorsk	Stroitel Stadium	5,000	5
Gomel	Gomel	Luch Stadium	5,000	6
Slavia	Mozyr	Yunost Stadium	5,250	7
Torpedo-MAZ	Minsk	Torpedo Stadium (Minsk)	5,200	8
Dnepr-Transmash	Mogilev	Spartak Stadion (Mogilev)	5,700	9
Molodechno-2000	Molodechno	City Stadium (Molodechno)	5,650	10
Dinamo Brest	Brest	OSK Brestskiy	3,000	11
Lokomotiv-96	Vitebsk	Dinamo Stadium (Vitebsk)	8,250	12
Torpedo	Zhodino	Torpedo Stadium (Zhodino)	5,000	First league, 1
Zvezda-VA-BGU	Minsk	Traktor Stadium	17,000	First league, 2

1. Gomel spent the season at Luch Stadium, as their regular stadium Central Stadium was closed for renovation.
2. One game played at City Stadium in Molodechno.

== Table ==
Pos	Team	Pld	W	D	L	GF	GA	GD	Pts	Qualification or relegation
1	BATE Borisov (C)	26	18	2	6	51	20	+31	56	Qualification for Champions League first qualifying round (Note: The title was decided in a championship playoff as BATE Borisov and Neman Grodno finished with equal points.)
2	Neman Grodno	26	17	5	4	47	20	+27	56	Qualification for UEFA Cup qualifying round
3	Shakhtyor Soligorsk	26	15	6	5	41	23	+18	51	Qualification for Intertoto Cup first round
4	Torpedo-MAZ Minsk	26	15	6	5	30	16	+14	51	
5	Torpedo Zhodino	26	13	4	9	38	27	+11	43	
6	Gomel	26	13	4	9	46	33	+13	43	
7	Dinamo Minsk	26	12	6	8	44	28	+16	42	Qualification for UEFA Cup qualifying round (Note: Dinamo Minsk qualified for the UEFA Cup qualifying round by winning the 2002–03 Belarusian Cup.)
8	Belshina Bobruisk	26	12	4	10	44	38	+6	37	
9	Dnepr-Transmash Mogilev	26	10	6	10	38	37	+1	36	
10	Dinamo Brest	26	8	8	10	25	26	−1	32	
11	Slavia Mozyr	26	6	6	14	38	61	−23	24	
12	Zvezda-VA-BGU Minsk	26	4	6	16	28	48	−20	18	
13	Molodechno-2000	26	3	3	20	23	59	−36	12	
14	Lokomotiv-96 Vitebsk (R)	26	3	0	23	20	77	−57	9	Relegation to Belarusian First League

Source: rsssf.com
Rules for classification: 1st points; 2nd matches won; 3rd head-to-head. Replay for title or relegation.
(C) Champions; (R) Relegated

=== Championship play-off ===
8 November 2002
13:00 UTC+3

BATE Borisov	1–0 (a.e.t.)	Neman Grodno
Tarasenka 102'	Report

Traktor Stadium, Minsk
Attendance: 7,000
Referee: Vladimir Sukhovarov (Orsha)

== Results ==
Home \ Away	BAT	BSH	DBR	DMI	DNE	GOM	LVI	MOL	NEM	SHA	SLA	TMI	TZH	ZBM
BATE Borisov		2–4	2–0	1–0	2–0	0–1	6–0	4–0	2–1	2–0	3–1	0–2	4–0	3–1
Belshina Bobruisk	2–1		1–1	2–1	3–1	3–0	1–2	3–2	1–5	0–1	2–2	3–2	1–0	1–1
Dinamo Brest	0–1	0–0		0–0	0–0	2–1	5–0	2–1	1–1	1–0	0–0	0–1	0–1	1–2
Dinamo Minsk	1–2	2–1	1–2		1–1	1–0	5–1	4–1	1–1	1–1	6–3	0–1	2–1	6–3
Dnepr-Transmash Mogilev	1–4	2–0	2–0	2–1		1–3	3–1	3–1	1–2	1–1	3–0	0–0	1–0	4–0
Gomel	1–0	1–0	3–0	1–1	3–2		3–0	5–0	1–1	1–1	3–2	0–2	1–4	2–2
Lokomotiv-96 Vitebsk	1–4	0–4	1–3	0–2	2–3	0–4		1–3	1–5	1–3	2–0	0–1	0–1	2–1
Molodechno-2000	1–3	2–3	1–3	0–1	1–2	0–3	3–1		0–1	0–2	2–2	0–0	0–2	1–1
Neman Grodno	0–1	1–0	2–1	2–0	3–2	2–1	1–0	2–0		1–0	5–2	1–1	1–1	2–0
Shakhtyor Soligorsk	2–0	1–0	2–0	1–0	3–0	3–1	3–1	3–1	1–0		2–2	2–2	3–0	2–1
Slavia Mozyr	0–2	1–6	1–1	0–4	3–2	0–2	2–1	3–0	1–3	5–2		0–2	3–2	1–2
Torpedo-MAZ Minsk	0–0	1–0	0–1	0–1	1–1	2–1	2–1	3–2	1–0	1–2	1–0		0–1	1–0
Torpedo Zhodino	0–0	4–0	2–1	0–0	2–0	3–2	5–0	2–0	0–2	0–0	1–2	0–2		4–1
Zvezda-VA-BGU Minsk	1–2	2–3	0–0	1–2	0–0	1–2	4–1	0–1	0–2	1–0	2–2	0–1	1–2	

Source: football.by (in Belarusian)
Legend: Blue = home team win; Yellow = draw; Red = away team win.

== Belarusian clubs in European Cups ==
Round	Team #1	Agg.	Team #2	1st leg	2nd leg
2002 UEFA Intertoto Cup
First round	BATE Borisov (Belarus)	3–0	(Denmark) Akademisk Boldklub	1–0	2–0
Second round	1860 München (Germany)	0–5	(Belarus) BATE Borisov	0–1	0–4
Third round	Bologna (Italy)	2–0	(Belarus) BATE Borisov	2–0	0–0
2002–03 UEFA Cup
Qualifying round	Dinamo Minsk (Belarus)	1–5	(Bulgaria) CSKA Sofia	1–4	0–1
Qualifying round	Gomel (Belarus)	5–0	(Finland) HJK Helsinki	1–0	4–0
First round	Gomel (Belarus)	1–8	(Germany) Schalke 04	1–4	0–4
2002–03 UEFA Champions League
First qualifying round	Portadown (Northern Ireland)	2–3	(Belarus) Belshina Bobruisk	0–0	2–3
Second qualifying round	Maccabi Haifa (Israel)	5–0	(Belarus) Belshina Bobruisk	4–0	1–0

== Top scorers ==
Rank	Name	Team	Goals
1	(Belarus) Valery Strypeykis	Belshina Bobruisk	18
2	(Belarus) Yury Markhel	Torpedo Zhodino	17
3	(Belarus) Sergey Nikiforenko	Shakhtyor Soligorsk	12
4	(Belarus) Viktor Borel	Gomel	11
4	(Belarus) Gennadi Bliznyuk	Gomel	11
4	(Belarus) Vadzim Boyka	Dinamo Brest	11
4	(Belarus) Ihor Chumachenko	BATE Borisov	11
4	(Belarus) Denis Karolik	Belshina Bobruisk	11
4	(Belarus) Dzmitry Kavalyonak	Neman Grodno	11
4	(Belarus) Maksim Tsyhalka	Dinamo Minsk	11

== See also ==
- 2002 Belarusian First League
- 2001–02 Belarusian Cup
- 2002–03 Belarusian Cup
