= Ihar Razhkow =

Belarusian professional footballer (born 1981)

Personal information
- Date of birth: 24 June 1981 (age 45)
- Place of birth: Mogilev, Belarusian SSR, Soviet Union
- Height: 1.82 m (6 ft 0 in)
- Position: Midfielder

Youth career
- 1997–1999: Dnepr Mogilev

Senior career*
Years	Team	Apps	(Gls)
1997–1999	Dnepr-2 Mogilev	18	(3)
1999	Veino-Dnepr Mogilev Raion	10	(2)
2000–2002	Dnepr-Transmash Mogilev	65	(9)
2003–2006	Dinamo Minsk	103	(5)
2007–2008	Kryvbas Kryvyi Rih	44	(0)
2009–2013	Shakhtyor Soligorsk	108	(2)
2014	Belshina Bobruisk	28	(2)
2015	Dinamo Brest	24	(1)
2016–2019	Gomel	67	(1)
2019	Slavia Mozyr	10	(1)
2020–2021	Arsenal Dzerzhinsk	27	(1)

International career
2002–2004	Belarus U21	19	(5)
2003	Belarus	1	(1)

Managerial career
- 2019–2022: Arsenal Dzerzhinsk (assistant)
- 2023–: BATE Borisov (assistant)
- * Club domestic league appearances and goals

Ihar Razhkow (Belarusian: Ігар Ражкоў; Russian: Игорь Рожков; born 24 June 1981) is a Belarusian professional football coach and former player.

== International goal ==
#	Date	Venue	Opponent	Score	Result	Competition
1	2 April 2003	Dinamo Stadium, Minsk, Belarus	Uzbekistan	2 – 0	2–2	Friendly

== Honours ==
Dinamo Minsk

- Belarusian Premier League champion: 2004
- Belarusian Cup winner: 2002–03

Shakhtyor Soligorsk

- Belarusian Cup winner: 2013–14
