= Viktor Borel =

Belarusian footballer and coach (born 1974)

Personal information
- Date of birth: 10 March 1974 (age 52)
- Place of birth: Petropavlovsk-Kamchatsky, Russian SFSR
- Height: 1.86 m (6 ft 1 in)
- Position: Forward

Team information
- Current team: Gomel (assistant coach)

Youth career
- Gomselmash Gomel

Senior career*
| Years | Team | Apps | (Gls) |
| 1992–1995 | Gomselmash Gomel | 68 | (13) |
| 1995 | Dinamo Minsk | 5 | (1) |
| 1996 | Dinamo-93 Minsk | 15 | (0) |
| 1997–2002 | Gomel | 144 | (59) |
| 2003 | Metallurg-Kuzbass Novokuznetsk | 16 | (2) |
| 2003–2006 | Shakhtyor Soligorsk | 42 | (6) |
| 2006 | Spartak Nizhny Novgorod | 17 | (4) |
| 2007 | Gomel | 2 | (0) |

Managerial career
- 2007–2009: Gomel (assistant)
- 2009: Gomel (caretaker)
- 2010–2014: Gomel (youth)
- 2013–2014: Belarus U19
- 2015–: Gomel (assistant)
- * Club domestic league appearances and goals

Viktor Borel (Belarusian: Віктар Барель; Russian: Виктор Борель; born 10 March 1974) is a Belarusian football coach and former player. As of 2015, he works as an assistant coach at FC Gomel.

== Honours ==
Dinamo Minsk

- Belarusian Premier League champion: 1995

Gomel

- Belarusian Cup winner: 2001–02

Shakhtyor Soligorsk

- Belarusian Premier League champion: 2005
- Belarusian Cup winner: 2003–04
