= Dennis Melander =

Swedish footballer

Personal information
- Full name: Dennis Melander
- Date of birth: 19 January 1983 (age 43)
- Place of birth: Trelleborg, Sweden
- Height: 1.75 m (5 ft 9 in)
- Position: Defender

Youth career
- –2002: Trelleborgs FF

Senior career*
Years	Team	Apps	(Gls)
2002–2012	Trelleborgs FF	117	(4)
2013–?	IFK Trelleborg	143	(23)

International career
2004	Sweden U21	1	(0)
- * Club domestic league appearances and goals as of 15 April 2011

Dennis Melander (born 19 January 1983) is a Swedish former professional footballer.
