= Aleksandr Kotlyarov =

Russian footballer

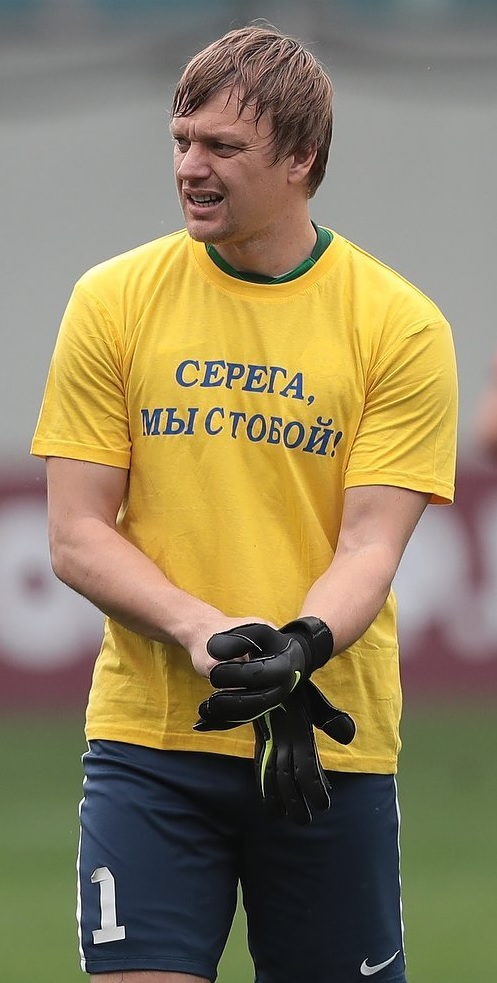
- Kotlyarov with Luch Vladivostok in 2019

Personal information
- Full name: Aleksandr Sergeyevich Kotlyarov
- Date of birth: 30 December 1983 (age 42)
- Place of birth: Ussuriysk, Russian SFSR
- Height: 1.90 m (6 ft 3 in)
- Position: Goalkeeper

Senior career*
Years	Team	Apps	(Gls)
2002–2003	Lokomotiv Minsk	2	(0)
2002	→ SKVICH Minsk	13	(0)
2004–2005	MTZ-RIPO Minsk	3	(0)
2006–2007	Sibir Novosibirsk	22	(0)
2008	Volga Nizhny Novgorod	5	(0)
2009–2012	Luch-Energiya Vladivostok	76	(0)
2012–2013	Ural Yekaterinburg	5	(0)
2013–2014	Luch-Energiya Vladivostok	7	(0)
2014–2015	Fakel Voronezh	14	(0)
2015–2020	Luch Vladivostok	105	(0)
- * Club domestic league appearances and goals

Aleksandr Sergeyevich Kotlyarov (Russian: Александр Серге́евич Котляров; born 30 December 1983) is a Russian former professional footballer.

== Club career ==
He made his Russian Football National League debut for FC Sibir Novosibirsk on 28 April 2006 in a game against FC Dynamo Makhachkala.
