= Lokomotiv Stadium (Minsk) =

Stadium in Belarus

- Interactive map of Lokomotiv Stadium
- Location: Minsk, Belarus
- Coordinates: 53.875425°N 27.554848°E
- Owner: Belarusian State Pedagogical University
- Capacity: 1,500
- Surface: Artificial grass

Construction
- Renovated: 2015–2016

Tenant
- Lokomotiv Minsk (2001–2008)

Lakamatyw (Belarusian: Лакаматыў) or Lokomotiv Stadium is a multi-use stadium in Minsk, Belarus. It is currently used mostly for football matches. The stadium holds 1,500 spectators.

== History ==
The stadium was actively used by Lokomotiv Minsk since club's debut season in 2001 and until 2008. The senior team used the ground through 2004. Since 2005, the stadium was not licensed to host Belarusian Premier League matches and became a home ground for Lokomotiv reserves instead, who used it until 2008.

The stadium originally had natural grass and capacity for 950 spectators. In 2015, it was acquired by Maxim Tank Belarusian State Pedagogical University and became alternatively known as BGPU Stadium (BDPU Stadium, Belarusian: БДПУ). The new owners performed some renovation works (grass was replaced by new artificial pitch and the stands capacity was increased to 1,500). Currently the stadium mostly hosts student matches and athletic practice.
