= Mazyr district =

District of Gomel region, Belarus

Coordinates: 52°03′N 29°14′E

Mazyr district Мазырскі раён (Belarusian) Мозырский район (Russian)
- District
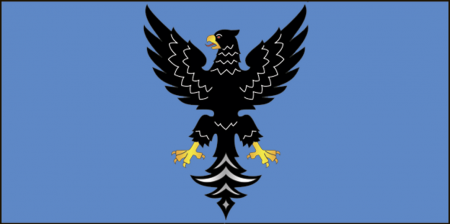
- Flag Coat of arms

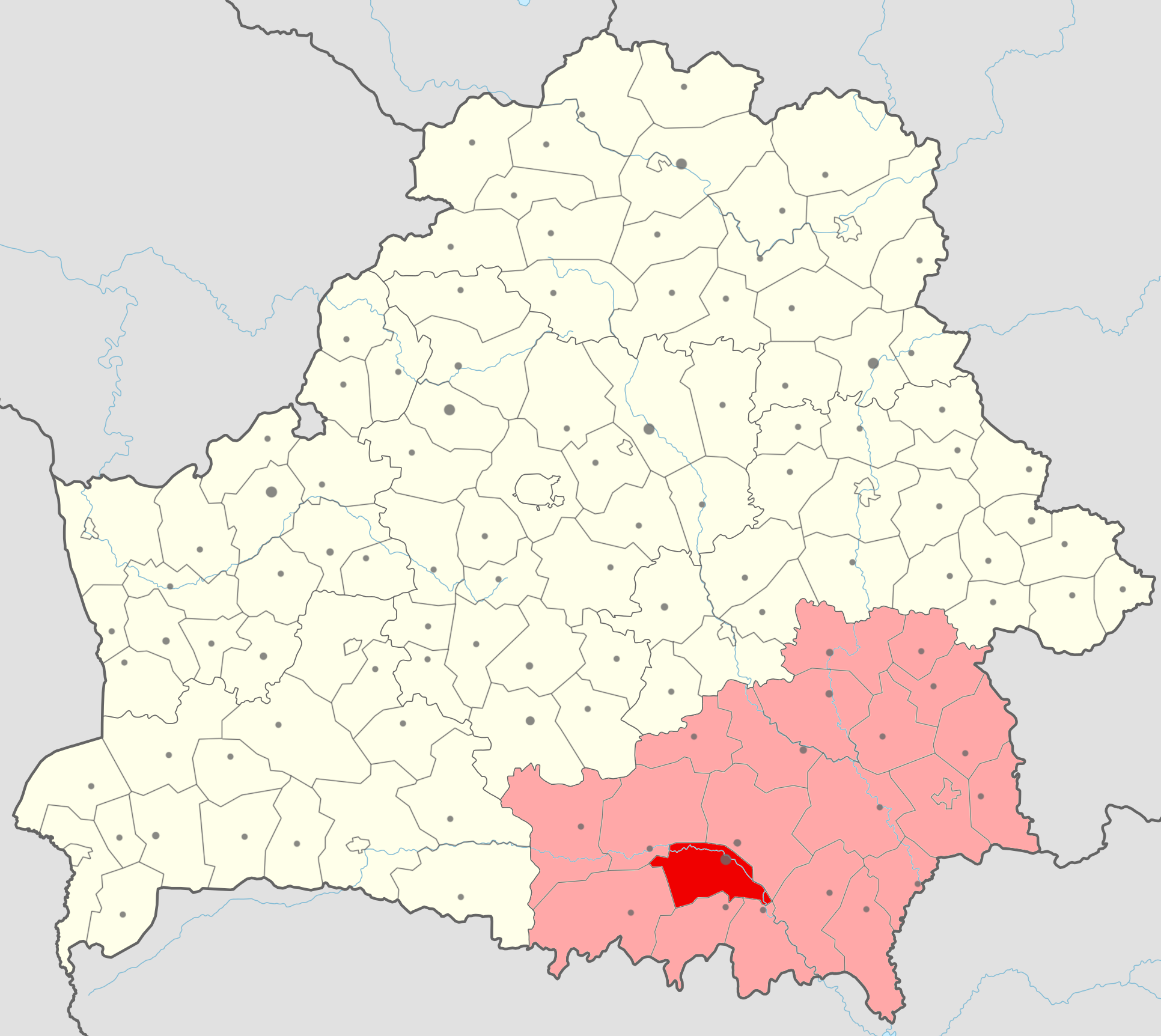
- Country: Belarus
- Region: Gomel region
- Administrative center: Mazyr

Area
  - Total: 1,603.47 km^{2} (619.10 sq mi)

Population (2024)
  - Total: 126,601
  - Density: 78.9544/km^{2} (204.491/sq mi)
- Time zone: UTC+3 (MSK)

Mazyr district (Belarusian: Мазырскі раён, romanized: Mazyrski rajon; Russian: Мозырский район) is a district (raion) of Gomel region in Belarus. Its administrative center is Mazyr. As of 2024, it has a population of 126,601.
