= Vasily Vodovozov =

Russian writer and literary critic (1825–1886)

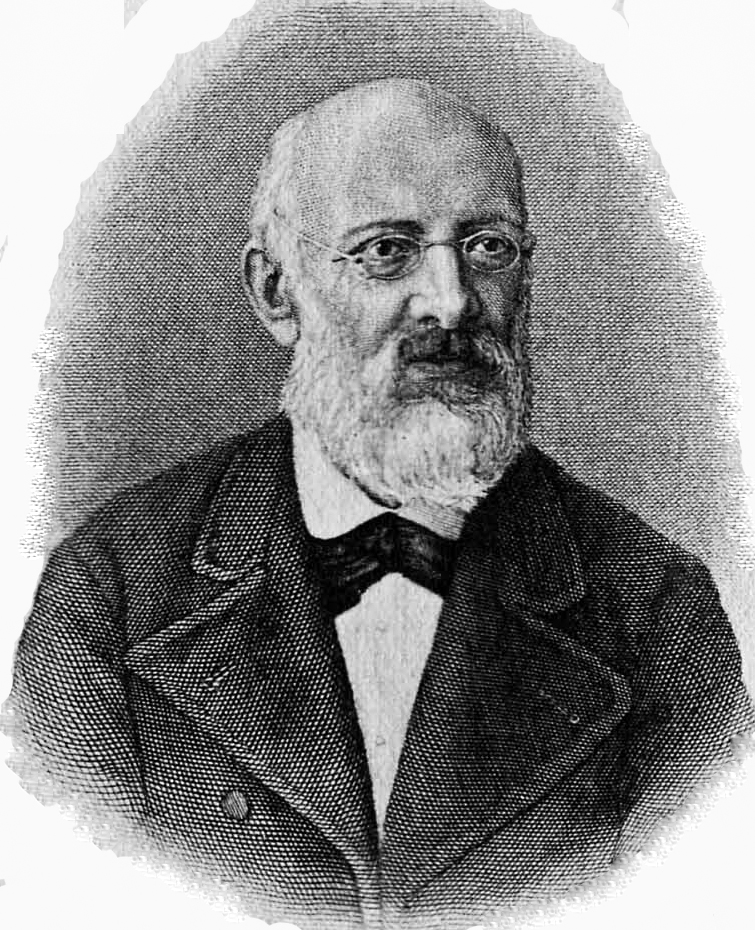
- Born: Vasily Ivanovich Vodovozov; Василий Иванович Водовозов; 9 October 1825; Saint Petersburg, Russian Empire
- Died: 29 May 1886 (aged 60); Saint Petersburg
- Occupations: writer, poet, pedagogue, translator
- Spouse: Elizaveta Vodovozova

Vasily Ivanovich Vodovozov (Russian: Ва́силий Ива́нович Водово́зов; 9 October 1825 – 29 May 1886) was a Saint-Petersburg-born Russian children's writer, poet, pedagogue, educational theorist and translator. Elizaveta Vodovozova (1884–1923), also a children's writer, was his wife.

Writing mostly for Biblioteka Dlya Chteniya, Otechestvennye Zapiski, Sovremennik and Vestnik Evropy, he published more than 120 articles and essays on education and pedagogy in Russia and Europe. Vodovozov compiled several popular compilations for children and teachers, three of which, Tales form Russian History (a set of historical documents which he provided forewords and commentaries for, 1861–1864), The Primary School Reader (1871) and The Book for Teachers (1871), received the prestigious Ushinsky Prize.

A polyglot who knew ten languages, Vodovozov translated into Russian the works by Anacreon, Sophocles, Horace, Catullus, Lucian, Lord Byron, Goethe and Beranger among many others. The best of them were included into the book Poetic Translations and Original Poems (1888). The Selected Works by V.I. Vodovozov came out in 1958 via The Soviet Pedagogical Academy Publishers.
