= Pavel Byahanski =

Belarusian footballer

Personal information
- Full name: Pavel Vikentyvevych Byahanski
- Date of birth: 9 January 1981 (age 45)
- Place of birth: Vileika, Byelorussian SSR, Soviet Union
- Height: 1.88 m (6 ft 2 in)
- Position: Forward

Team information
- Current team: Isloch Minsk Raion (youth coach)

Senior career*
Years	Team	Apps	(Gls)
1997–2000	RUOR Minsk	79	(35)
2000–2005	BATE Borisov	45	(24)
2004	→ MTZ-RIPO Minsk (loan)	8	(2)
2005	→ Zhenis Astana (loan)	15	(5)
2006–2007	Shakhtyor Soligorsk	26	(8)
2007	Oțelul Galați	3	(0)
2007–2009	Illichivets Mariupol	29	(5)
2009	Granit Mikashevichi	4	(0)
2009	Shakhtyor Soligorsk	13	(3)
2010	Torpedo Zhodino	11	(6)
2010	Tobol Kostanay	11	(3)
2011–2014	Rechitsa-2014	87	(27)
2014–2015	Dnepr Rogachev	24	(10)
Total		355	(138)

International career
2001–2004	Belarus U21	21	(5)
- * Club domestic league appearances and goals

Pavel Byahanski (Belarusian: Павел Бяганскі; Russian: Павел Беганский; born 9 January 1981) is a retired Belarusian footballer (forward). He is currently a youth coach at Isloch Minsk Raion.

== Career ==
=== Coaching career ===
In February 2016, Buahanski returned to BATE Borisov as a youth coach. In September 2018, he joined Isloch Minsk Raion as a youth coach.

== Honours ==
BATE Borisov

- Belarusian Premier League champion: 2002

Zhenis Astana

- Kazakhstan Cup winner: 2005

Tobol Kostanay

- Kazakhstan Premier League champion: 2010
