= Valery Tarasenka =

Belarusian footballer and coach

Personal information
- Date of birth: 1 September 1981 (age 45)
- Place of birth: Minsk, Belarusian SSR
- Height: 1.86 m (6 ft 1 in)
- Position: Defender

Team information
- Current team: Žalgiris (assistant)

Youth career
- 1997–2000: Smena Minsk

Senior career*
Years	Team	Apps	(Gls)
1997	Real Minsk	2	(0)
1999	Smena-BATE Minsk	5	(0)
2000	RShVSM-Olympia Minsk	26	(1)
2001–2004	BATE Borisov	51	(13)
2005	Gomel	16	(0)
2006	Neman Grodno	23	(5)
2007	MTZ-RIPO Minsk	19	(2)
2008	Tobol Kostanay	13	(2)
2009	Granit Mikashevichi	18	(0)
2010	Neman Grodno	9	(0)
2010	Torpedo Zhodino	9	(0)
2011	Dinamo Brest	10	(0)
2011–2014	Gorodeya	71	(5)
2015	Slavia Mozyr	23	(1)

International career
2002–2004	Belarus U-21	15	(1)

Managerial career
- 2019: BATE Borisov (assistant)
- 2020: Žalgiris (assistant)
- 2021: Aktobe (assistant)
- 2021: Shakhtyor Soligorsk (assistant)
- 2022: Sumgayit (assistant)
- 2022–: Shakhtyor Soligorsk (assistant)
- * Club domestic league appearances and goals

Valery Tarasenka (Belarusian: Валерый Тарасенка; Russian: Валерий Тарасенко; born 1 September 1981) is a Belarusian professional football coach and former player.

== Career ==
=== Coaching career ===
In February 2016, it was confirmed that Tarasenka had returned to BATE Borisov as a youth coach. After three years, he joined the coaching staff of the BATE's first team in January 2019 under head coach Alyaksey Baha. He left BATE at the end of December 2019.

In January 2020, he followed Alyaksey Baha, as his assistant coach, to Lithuanian club FK Žalgiris.

== Honours ==
BATE Borisov

- Belarusian Premier League champion: 2002
