= FC Luninets =

- Full name: Football Club Luninets
- Founded: 1999
- Ground: Luninets, Brest Region, Belarus
- Manager: Viktor Grinevich
- League: Belarusian Second League
- 2022: 5th (Brest Oblast)

FC Luninets is a Belarusian football club based in Luninets, Brest Region.

== History ==
FC Luninets was founded in 1999 and joined Belarusian Second League the same year. The team quickly overshadowed local rivals Polesye Luninets (who were already playing in Second League for several seasons) and earned a promotion to the First League on their first attempt.

Luninets fought for the promotion in their debut First League season, but ultimately finished second, losing the race to Molodechno. At the end of the year the team folded due to lack of financing.

During their short history the team was led by coach Yakov Shapiro.

At some point after their withdrawal from the First League they started playing in Brest Oblast league as an amateur team. In 2021 they rejoined Belarusian Second League.

== Current squad ==
As of February 2024

Note: Flags indicate national team as defined under FIFA eligibility rules; some limited exceptions apply. Players may hold more than one non-FIFA nationality.

No.	Pos.	Nation	Player
—	GK	BLR	Vladislav Birukevich
—	GK	BLR	Denis Grib
—	GK	BLR	Aleksandr Oleshkevich
—	GK	BLR	Andrey Sholomitskiy
—	DF	BLR	Artem Abramchuk
—	DF	BLR	Petr Voytekhovskiy
—	DF	BLR	Anton Konopatskiy
—	DF	BLR	Ruslan Konopatskiy
—	DF	BLR	Vitaliy Kuzmich
—	DF	BLR	Mikhail Sanyukovich
—	DF	BLR	Ilya Sidorevich
—	DF	BLR	Viktor Ulasevich
—	MF	BLR	Stanislav Busko
—	MF	BLR	Vladislav Knyrevich
—	MF	BLR	Dmitriy Kovshik

No.	Pos.	Nation	Player
—	MF	BLR	Ilya Korovayevich
—	MF	BLR	Stanislaw Kuzmin
—	MF	BLR	Mikalay Lahun
—	MF	BLR	Artem Lukashevich
—	MF	BLR	Maksim Lukashevich
—	MF	BLR	Ryhor Tarasevich
—	MF	BLR	Nikita Tropets
—	MF	BLR	Konstantin Shilovets
—	MF	BLR	Andrey Yarutich
—	FW	BLR	Viktor Velesyuk
—	FW	BLR	Nikita Yeroshkin
—	FW	BLR	Maksim Karpets
—	FW	BLR	Anton Konopatskiy
—	FW	BLR	Nikolay Simonovich
—	FW	BLR	Fedor Stakhovets
