= Luch Stadium =

Multi-use stadium in Gomel, Belarus

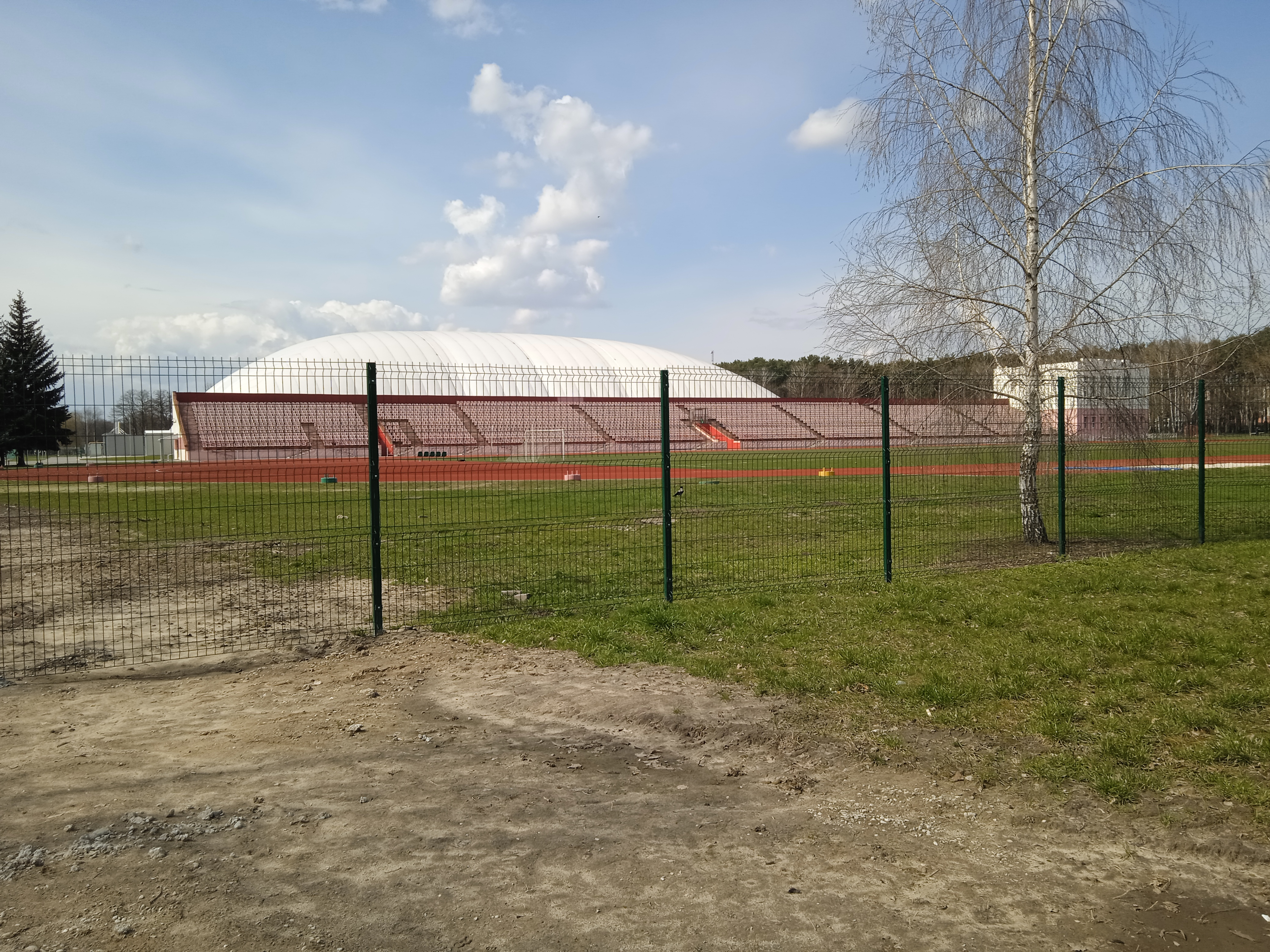
- Interactive map of Luch Stadium
- Location: Gomel, Belarus
- Coordinates: 52.408586°N 30.949213°E
- Capacity: 5,000
- Surface: Grass

Construction
- Opened: 1978

Tenant
- Gomel

Luch Stadium is a multi-use stadium in Gomel, Belarus. It is currently used mostly for football matches and is currently used by Gomel as a training facility. The stadium holds 5,000 spectators.

== History ==
The stadium was opened in 1978 and has been used by various Gomel-based clubs. In 1993–1994 and 2000–2003 (while Gomel Central Stadium was closed for renovations), Luch Stadium was a primary home venue for FC Gomel in Belarusian Premier League. Post-2003, the stadium was used by FC Gomel reserves. Since 2010, the stadium has been in use as a training facility only.
