= Awtazavodets-Traktar =

Football club in Minsk, Belarus

- Full name: Football Club Awtazavodets-Traktar Minsk
- Nickname(s): трактарысты (Belarusian for 'Tractor Drivers')
- Founded: 1947; 2015 (refounded)
- Ground: Traktar Stadium, Minsk
- League: Belarusian Second League

Awtazavodets-Traktar (Belarusian: Аўтазаводзец-Трактар, Russian: Автозаводец-Трактор), before 2024 – FC Tractor Minsk (Belarusian: ФК Трактар Мінск, Russian: ФК Трактор Минск) is a football team from Belarus.

== History ==
It was established in 1947 during the building of Minsk Tractor Works as a sport section for construction workers and later for local factory personal. The club won the Belarusian SSR League in 1948 and 1949. From 1949 till 1957 they were known as Torpedo-MTZ Minsk (Tarpeda-MTZ) and from 1958 till early 1960s as MTZ Minsk. Until 1991 the club played at the top or second level of Belarusian SSR league, and from 1992 till 2001 in lower Belarusian leagues.

In 2002 Traktor Minsk merged with Trudovye Rezervy-RIPO Minsk to create MTZ-RIPO Minsk. It was refounded in 2015 and currently plays in Belarusian Second League.

=== Performance history ===
Season	League	Pos.	Pl.	W	D	L	GS	GA	P	Cup	Notes	Manager
1992	3D	5	15	6	6	3	20	17	18			
1992–93	3D	5	30	14	7	9	52	33	35			
1993–94	3D	13	34	10	7	17	37	72	27			
?
1998	3D – A	3	26	15	6	5	38	25	51			
1999	3D	1	24	16	7	1	41	12	55		Promoted	
2000	2D	13	30	10	7	13	43	41	37		Relegated	
2001	3D	11	34	11	9	14	42	44	42	First round	Merged	
