= FC SKVICh Minsk =

FK SKVICh Lokomotiv Minsk
- Full name: ТАА «Футбольны клуб СКВІЧ» (TAA Futbol'ny klub SKVICh)
- Founded: 2000
- Dissolved: 2014
- Ground: Lokomotiv Stadium, Minsk
- League: Belarusian Second League
- 2014: 24th
Home colours	Away colours

FC SKVICh Minsk (Belarusian: ФК СКВІЧ) was a Belarusian football club based in Minsk, last playing in the Belarusian Second League.

== History ==
The team was founded in late 2000 by travel company SKVICh, which had had investments in sport and football projects (such as their own football school) for several years. Before the start of their first season, after gaining support from Belarusian Railways, the team was renamed Lokomotiv Minsk (Lakamatyw Minsk, Belarusian: Лакаматыў Мінск). The team won the Second League in 2001 and finished 3rd in the First League the following year and was promoted to the Belarusian Premier League.

The club finished in the relegation zone of the table in three of their four seasons in the Premier League; twice they were promoted after only one season, until they got stuck in the First League following relegation in 2008. In 2009, they reverted to their original name SKVICh Minsk.

Lokomotiv reached the final of the 2002–03 Belarusian Cup, losing to Dinamo Minsk.

The club was dissolved after the 2014 season.

== Honours ==
- Belarusian Cup
  - Runners-up (1): 2003

== League and Cup history ==
Season	Level	Pos	Pld	W	D	L	Goals	Points	Domestic Cup	Notes
2001	3rd	1	34	26	4	4	77–17	82		Promoted
2002	2nd	3	30	20	6	4	59–16	66	Quarter-finals	Promoted
2003	1st	15	30	5	9	16	16–42	24	Runners-up	Relegated
2004	2nd	1	30	24	3	3	75–25	75	Quarter-finals	Promoted
2005	1st	11	26	7	5	14	30–43	26	Round of 32	
2006	1st	13	26	5	4	17	26–52	19	Round of 16	Relegated
2007	2nd	3	26	16	4	6	49–21	52	Round of 16	Promoted
2008	1st	14	30	6	7	17	28–50	25	Round of 16	Relegated
2009	2nd	5	26	11	6	9	37–29	39	Round of 16	
2010	2nd	2	30	17	7	6	52–21	58	Round of 64	Promotion play-off
2011	2nd	4	30	16	6	8	57–27	54	Round of 32	
2012	2nd	4	28	16	7	5	61–19	55	Quarter-finals	
2013	2nd						–		Quarterfinals	
