= List of Belarusian football transfers winter 2024–25 =

This is a list of Belarusian football transfers in the 2024–25 winter transfer window by club. Only clubs of the 2025 Belarusian Premier League are included.

== Belarusian Premier League 2025 ==
=== Arsenal Dzerzhinsk ===
In:

No.	Pos.	Nation	Player
4	MF	SUI	Nikita Vlasenko (from (Switzerland) Servette II)
6	MF	RUS	Andrei Ishutin (from (Russia) Spartak Moscow, previously on loan to (Russia) Rostov-2)
7	FW	BLR	Aleksandr Shvedchikov (on loan from BATE Borisov)
8	MF	ARM	Vadim Harutyunyan (on loan from (Russia) Lokomotiv Moscow, previously to the same club)
9	FW	BLR	Ruslan Myalkovsky (on loan from (Russia) Lokomotiv Moscow, previously to the same club)
10	MF	BLR	Valeriy Senko (from Isloch Minsk Raion)
14	DF	BLR	Matvey Mikhayrin (from Dinamo Minsk)
15	MF	BLR	Yaroslav Oreshkevich (from Dynamo Brest)
18	DF	BLR	Aleksandr Mikhalenko (from Minsk)
19	FW	BLR	Aleksandr Frantsuzov (from (Russia) Chertanovo Moscow)
23	MF	TJK	Salokhiddin Irgashev (from (Tajikistan) Istiklol, previously on loan to (Tajikistan) Vakhsh Bokhtar)
27	MF	BLR	Maksim Gayevoy (from Smorgon)
31	GK	RUS	Daniil Polyansky (from (Armenia) Van)
63	MF	TJK	Fatkhullo Olimzoda (from (Kazakhstan) Atyrau)
77	MF	BLR	Nikolay Sotnikov (from Shakhtyor Soligorsk)
81	DF	BLR	Gleb Yakushevich (on loan from (Russia) Shinnik Yaroslavl)
88	MF	BLR	Kirill Kirilenko (from Maxline Vitebsk)

Out:

No.	Pos.	Nation	Player
2	DF	BLR	Aleksandr Chizh (to (Kyrgyzstan) Kyrgyzaltyn)
7	MF	BRA	Fred Júnior (to (Brazil) Foz do Iguaçu)
10	FW	BLR	Alyaksandr Kazakow (to Gorodeya)
15	MF	BLR	Yegor Babich (to Unixlabs)
20	MF	ANG	Edgar André
23	GK	BLR	Alyaksey Vasilyew (to Lida)
25	FW	BLR	Dmitry Matyash (on loan to Volna Pinsk)
27	FW	BLR	Ivan Tolkachyov (on loan to Ostrovets)
34	FW	BLR	Artsyom Pyatrenka (to Dnepr Mogilev)
39	FW	KAZ	Matvey Gerasimov (to (Kazakhstan) Irtysh Pavlodar)
47	MF	RUS	Danila Godyayev (end of loan from (Russia) Lokomotiv Moscow)
50	GK	BLR	Matvey Kovruk (to Slutsk)
66	DF	BLR	Arseny Ageyev (end of loan from (Russia) Lokomotiv Moscow)
72	DF	BLR	Aleksandr Poznyak (to Slutsk)
77	MF	BLR	Evgeniy Sakuta (to Unixlabs)
80	MF	RUS	Nikita Yershov (to (Russia) Kosmos Dolgoprudny)
91	FW	BLR	Gleb Prigodsky
—	DF	BLR	Stanislav Kazmerchuk (on loan to ABFF U-19, previously from ABFF U-17)

=== BATE Borisov ===
In:

No.	Pos.	Nation	Player
7	MF	BLR	Aleksandr Svirepa (from Dinamo Minsk, previously on loan to Dynamo Brest)
8	MF	MDA	Igor Costrov (from Neman Grodno)
10	MF	CIV	Rayan Guibero (from Smorgon)
11	FW	RUS	Nikolai Prudnikov (from (Russia) Volgar Astrakhan)
16	GK	BLR	Danila Sokol (from Slavia Mozyr, previously on loan to Belshina Bobruisk)
17	MF	CIV	Donald Dongo (from Dnepr Mogilev)
19	DF	BLR	Vladislav Lyakh (from Dynamo Brest)
23	DF	BLR	Ilya Rashchenya (from Gomel)
29	FW	CIV	Yao Jean Charles (from (Russia) SKA-Khabarovsk)
45	FW	BLR	Yegor Grivenyov (from Shakhtyor Soligorsk)
77	FW	BEL	Ibrahim Kargbo Jr. (from (Serbia) Jedinstvo Ub)

Out:

No.	Pos.	Nation	Player
3	DF	BLR	Ruslan Khadarkevich (to Minsk)
5	DF	CIV	Zai Sidibé
6	MF	BLR	Arseny Blotsky (on loan to Unixlabs)
10	MF	BLR	Oleg Nikiforenko (to Maxline Vitebsk)
13	MF	BLR	Ilya Aleksiyevich (to Gomel)
14	DF	CIV	Sherif Jimoh (to (Kazakhstan) Ordabasy)
18	FW	BLR	Aleksandr Shvedchikov (on loan to Arsenal Dzerzhinsk)
19	FW	KAZ	Oralkhan Omirtayev (to (Kazakhstan) Aktobe)
22	MF	BLR	Zakhar Gitselev (on loan to Volna Pinsk)
23	GK	BLR	Uladzislaw Ihnatsyew (on loan to Minsk)
55	DF	CIV	Yann Emmanuel Affi (to (Iceland) Þór Akureyri)
62	FW	RUS	Temur Dzhikiya (end of loan from (Russia) Volga Ulyanovsk)
—	MF	BLR	Ilya Baranov (on loan to Volna Pinsk)
—	MF	BLR	Denis Grechikho (to Dinamo Minsk, previously on loan to (Kazakhstan) Zhenis)

=== Dynamo Brest ===
In:

No.	Pos.	Nation	Player
2	MF	BLR	Andrey Rylach (from Dinamo Minsk, previously on loan to Gomel)
7	MF	BLR	Artyom Bykov (from (Greece) Lamia)
8	MF	BLR	Anton Shramchenko (from (Kazakhstan) Zhetysu)
10	MF	KAZ	Vladislav Vasilyev (from Minsk)
12	DF	BLR	Denis Gruzhevsky (from Shakhtyor Soligorsk)
17	MF	RUS	Igor Konovalov
18	DF	BLR	Nikita Stepanov (from (Kazakhstan) Atyrau)
19	DF	BLR	Denis Polyakov (from Dinamo Minsk)
24	MF	RUS	Yegor Kortsov (from (Russia) Leningradets Leningrad Oblast, previously on loan)
51	FW	BLR	Denis Laptev (from Torpedo-BelAZ Zhodino)
55	DF	BLR	Aleksey Lavrik (from Neman Grodno)
88	FW	BLR	Denis Kovalevich (from Shakhtyor Soligorsk)
99	MF	BLR	Ivan Zenkov (from Shakhtyor Soligorsk)
—	FW	BLR	Nikita Lyukevich (end of loan to ABFF U-17)

Out:

No.	Pos.	Nation	Player
2	DF	CMR	Georges Moussinga (to (United States) Chiefs United)
7	MF	BLR	Aleksandr Svirepa (end of loan from Dinamo Minsk)
8	FW	KEN	Josephat Lopaga (previously on loan to Naftan Novopolotsk)
10	FW	BLR	Ilya Chernyak (to (Russia) Ufa)
15	MF	BLR	Syarhey Kislyak (retired)
17	MF	BLR	Matvey Dukso (on loan to Molodechno, previously on loan to Smorgon)
19	DF	BLR	Vladislav Lyakh (to BATE Borisov)
23	MF	BLR	Edgar Olekhnovich (retired)
29	MF	BLR	Yaroslav Oreshkevich (to Arsenal Dzerzhinsk)
34	DF	BLR	Aleksey Vakulich (end of loan from (Russia) Arsenal Tula)
59	DF	BLR	Illya Kalpachuk (to (Poland) Legionovia Legionowo)
63	FW	BLR	German Barkovsky (to (Poland) Puszcza Niepołomice)
77	DF	BLR	Ilya Bogdanovich (on loan to Smorgon, previously on loan to Belshina Bobruisk)
87	DF	GAB	Stane Essono
—	MF	BLR	Dmitry Lesnyak (on loan to Molodechno, previously on loan to Niva Dolbizno)

=== Dinamo Minsk ===
In:

No.	Pos.	Nation	Player
1	GK	BLR	Artem Makavchik (end of loan to Slavia Mozyr)
3	DF	RUS	Ilya Kalachyov (from (Russia) Baltika Kaliningrad)
6	MF	BLR	Maksim Myakish (from Torpedo-BelAZ Zhodino)
7	MF	BLR	Yevgeny Malashevich (from Minsk)
9	FW	MNE	Dušan Bakić (from (Cyprus) Omonia, previously on loan to (Cyprus) Karmiotissa)
10	FW	BLR	Karen Vardanyan (from Vitebsk)
11	FW	CTA	Moustapha Djimet (from Minsk)
18	MF	BLR	Denis Grechikho (from BATE Borisov, previously on loan to (Kazakhstan) Zhenis)
21	MF	BLR	Yevgeny Shevchenko (from (Russia) Arsenal Tula)
24	DF	BLR	Aleksey Vakulich (from (Russia) Arsenal Tula, previously on loan to Dynamo Brest)
31	GK	BLR	Denis Shpakovsky (end of loan to Slutsk)
33	DF	GHA	Fard Ibrahim (from Isloch Minsk Raion)
99	MF	BLR	Kirill Tsepenkov (from Slutsk)
—	MF	BLR	Viktor Lisovsky (end of loan to Energetik-BGU Minsk)
—	MF	BLR	Artyom Samuylik (end of loan to Volna Pinsk)

Out:

No.	Pos.	Nation	Player
3	MF	NGA	Joseph Okoro (to (Tajikistan) Istiklol)
6	DF	BLR	Sergey Politevich (to Torpedo-BelAZ Zhodino)
7	FW	BLR	Maksim Budko (on loan to Molodechno)
8	MF	BLR	Aleksandr Selyava (to Torpedo-BelAZ Zhodino)
9	FW	NGA	Steven Alfred (to (Russia) Shinnik Yaroslavl)
10	FW	BLR	Uladzimir Khvashchynski (to Isloch Minsk Raion)
11	MF	BLR	Gleb Zherdev (to Maxline Vitebsk)
14	MF	NGA	Raymond Adeola (to (Greece) Asteras Tripolis)
15	MF	BLR	Aleksandr Svirepa (to BATE Borisov, previously on loan to Dynamo Brest)
19	MF	BLR	Dmitry Podstrelov (to (Albania) Partizani Tirana)
20	DF	BLR	Alyaksandr Sachywka (to Uzda)
21	GK	BLR	Fyodor Lapoukhov (to (Bulgaria) CSKA Sofia)
24	MF	RUS	Daniil Kulikov (to (Armenia) Pyunik)
27	DF	BLR	Matvey Mikhayrin (to Arsenal Dzerzhinsk)
29	MF	CIV	Boni Amian (end of loan from (Russia) Khimki)
33	DF	BLR	Denis Polyakov (to Dynamo Brest)
37	MF	BLR	Vladislav Krolik (on loan to Molodechno)
66	DF	BRA	Raí Lopes (to (Moldova) Sheriff Tiraspol)
74	MF	BLR	Pavel Sedko (to Torpedo-BelAZ Zhodino)
77	MF	BLR	Andrey Rylach (to Dynamo Brest, previously on loan to Gomel)
80	MF	RUS	Igor Shkolik (to (Greece) Iraklis)
81	FW	BLR	Trofim Melnichenko (to (Portugal) Porto B)
97	DF	BLR	Vasily Chernyavsky (on loan to Slutsk)
99	MF	BLR	Artyom Sokolovsky (on loan to Slutsk)
—	DF	BLR	Matvey Dubatovka (on loan to Slutsk)
—	FW	BLR	Ilya Dubinets (to Minsk, previously on loan to Slutsk)
—	GK	BLR	Ivan Frolov (on loan to Belshina Bobruisk)
—	FW	BLR	Matvey Kalinovsky (on loan to Orsha)
—	DF	BLR	Kirill Kovsh (on loan to Lokomotiv Gomel, previously on loan to Naftan Novopolotsk)
—	MF	BLR	Dmitry Nizhnik (on loan to Lokomotiv Gomel, previously on loan to Naftan Novopolotsk)

=== Gomel ===
In:

No.	Pos.	Nation	Player
2	MF	BLR	Vadim Martinkevich (from Shakhtyor Soligorsk)
10	MF	BLR	Dzmitry Baradzin (from (Kazakhstan) Kaisar)
11	FW	BLR	Alyaksandr Butsko (from Isloch Minsk Raion)
13	MF	BLR	Ilya Aleksiyevich (from BATE Borisov)
15	DF	BLR	Andrey Shamruk (from Slavia Mozyr)
19	DF	FRA	Souleymane Fofana (from (Russia) Shinnik Yaroslavl)
25	MF	CIV	Samuel Eda (from (Serbia) Jedinstvo Ub)
63	FW	NIG	Abou Soufiane Waddou (from (Azerbaijan) Zaqatala)
70	FW	RUS	Kirill Cheburakov (on loan from (Russia) Rostov)
77	MF	BLR	Alyaksandr Savitski (end of loan to Bumprom Gomel)
88	GK	BLR	Aleksandr Ryzhchenko (end of loan to Lokomotiv Gomel)
90	DF	BLR	Georgiy Kukushkin (from Shakhtyor Soligorsk)
99	FW	BLR	Dzmitry Yemyalyanaw (end of loan to Lokomotiv Gomel)
—	MF	BLR	Vladislav Drapeza (end of loan to Bumprom Gomel)

Out:

No.	Pos.	Nation	Player
2	MF	BLR	Andrey Rylach (end of loan from Dinamo Minsk)
9	FW	RUS	Ilya Grishchenko (on loan to Slutsk)
11	FW	GAB	Junior Effaghe (to (Cyprus) Aris Limassol)
27	MF	BLR	Kirill Yermakovich (to Naftan Novopolotsk)
71	GK	BLR	Aleksandr Naumovich (to Naftan Novopolotsk, previously on loan)
72	DF	BLR	Ilya Rashchenya (to BATE Borisov)
91	FW	BLR	Mikita Nyakrasaw (to Lokomotiv Gomel)
99	MF	NGA	Fawaz Abdullahi (end of loan from (Cyprus) APOEL)

=== Isloch Minsk Raion ===
In:

No.	Pos.	Nation	Player
8	MF	BLR	Aleksandr Guz (on loan from (Russia) Torpedo Moscow, previously on loan to (Russia) Sokol Saratov)
10	FW	BLR	Uladzimir Khvashchynski (from Dinamo Minsk)
14	DF	NGA	Mohammed Dayyabu (from (Nigeria) One Touch Abuja)
15	MF	BLR	Nikita Patsko (from Torpedo-BelAZ Zhodino)
19	FW	NGA	Adeola Olaleye (from (Nigeria) One Touch Abuja)
23	MF	BLR	Maksim Kovalevich (from Shakhtyor Soligorsk)
25	DF	BLR	Andrey Makarenko (from Shakhtyor Soligorsk)
27	MF	KGZ	Nurdoolot Stalbekov (from (Kyrgyzstan) Alay)
31	DF	BLR	Andrey Zaleski (from Slavia Mozyr)
88	MF	RUS	Nikita Knyshev (from (Russia) Saturn Ramenskoye)
89	DF	BLR	Kirill Yankovskiy (from Shakhtyor Soligorsk)
99	DF	BLR	Yevgeny Yudchits (from Maxline Vitebsk, previously from Isloch Minsk Raion)
—	MF	BLR	Ignat Stabletskiy (from Dnepr Mogilev)

Out:

No.	Pos.	Nation	Player
4	DF	GHA	Prince Amponsah
5	DF	BLR	Maksim Kovel (to (Kazakhstan) Zhetysu)
6	MF	BLR	Dmitry Sibilev (to Niva Dolbizno)
8	MF	MKD	Ramin Alii (to (Armenia) Syunik)
9	FW	BLR	Aleksandr Makas (to Minsk)
10	MF	BLR	Valeriy Senko (to Arsenal Dzerzhinsk)
15	FW	BLR	Rodion Medvedev (on loan to Volna Pinsk)
23	DF	GHA	Fard Ibrahim (to Dinamo Minsk)
24	GK	BLR	Arseny Zabrodsky
25	MF	BLR	Daniil Galyata (to Maxline Vitebsk)
35	DF	BLR	Aleksandr Voronovich (to Krumkachy Minsk)
70	FW	BLR	Alyaksandr Butsko (to Gomel)
88	MF	BLR	Vladimir Maslovskiy (to Smorgon)
—	FW	BLR	Artyom Davidovich (on loan to Lokomotiv Gomel)
—	FW	BLR	Vladislav Gizhevsky (on loan to Lokomotiv Gomel)
—	FW	BLR	Vladislav Kabachevsky (to (Russia) SKA Rostov-on-Don, previously on loan to Belshina Bobruisk)
—	MF	BLR	Matvey Skalozub
—	MF	BLR	Pavel Shevchenko (on loan to Lokomotiv Gomel, previously on loan to ABFF U-17)
—	FW	BLR	Arseny Zhukovsky (on loan to Baranovichi, previously on loan to Ostrovets)

=== Maxline Vitebsk ===
In:

No.	Pos.	Nation	Player
1	GK	BLR	Pavel Pavlyuchenko (from (Uzbekistan) Pakhtakor Tashkent)
2	MF	BLR	Aleksey Nosko (from (Uzbekistan) Sogdiana Jizzakh)
3	DF	BLR	Nikita Baranok (on loan from (Russia) Akron Tolyatti)
4	MF	NGA	Ode Abdullahi (on loan from (Cyprus) Aris Limassol, previously from (Lithuania) Dainava)
9	MF	BLR	Gleb Zherdev (from Dinamo Minsk)
10	MF	BLR	Oleg Nikiforenko (from BATE Borisov)
13	DF	BLR	Aleksey Zalesky (from Torpedo-BelAZ Zhodino)
14	MF	BLR	Ruslan Lisakovich (from Minsk)
17	MF	BLR	Daniil Galyata (from Isloch Minsk Raion)
20	DF	BLR	Zakhar Volkov (from (Russia) Khimki, previously on loan to (Russia) Arsenal Tula)
21	MF	RUS	Nikita Glushkov (on loan from (Russia) Baltika Kaliningrad)
22	DF	BLR	Denis Levitsky (from Torpedo-BelAZ Zhodino)
33	FW	BRA	Rafael Reis (from (Brazil) Santo André)
55	DF	BLR	Nikita Bykov (from Vitebsk)
70	MF	BRA	Rafael Juninho (on loan from (Brazil) Corinthians)
77	MF	SEN	Honore Gomis (from (Georgia (country)) Dinamo Batumi)
80	FW	BLR	Denis Ovsyannikov (from ABFF U-17)
88	DF	BLR	Yegor Bozhko (from Volna Pinsk)
—	FW	BLR	Mark Bulanov (from Shakhtyor Soligorsk)
—	GK	BLR	Daniil Kotov (from Shakhtyor Soligorsk)
—	DF	BLR	Kirill Muzychenko (from Kolos Cherven)

Out:

No.	Pos.	Nation	Player
1	GK	BLR	Arseny Kudin (to Osipovichi)
3	DF	BLR	Nikita Kostomarov (to Naftan Novopolotsk)
7	MF	BLR	Alfred Mazurich (end of loan from Neman Grodno)
11	MF	BLR	Maksim Omelyanchuk
15	DF	BLR	Andrey Alshanik (to Bumprom Gomel)
17	MF	BLR	Mikalay Ivanow (to Slavia Mozyr)
19	DF	BLR	Artem Bruy
25	MF	MAR	Yassine Bara (to Ostrovets)
35	DF	BLR	Nikolay Zolotov
61	MF	RUS	Aleksandr Stavpets
88	MF	BLR	Kirill Kirilenko (to Arsenal Dzerzhinsk)
92	FW	ARM	David Arshakyan
93	FW	RUS	Mikhail Markin (to Slavia Mozyr)
99	GK	BLR	Aleksander Titov
99	DF	BLR	Yevgeny Yudchits (to Isloch Minsk Raion, previously from the same club)
—	DF	BLR	Daniil Kovalev (on loan to Volna Pinsk, previously from Bumprom Gomel)
—	MF	BLR	Vladimir Skomarovsky (on loan to ABFF U-19, previously from ABFF U-17)

=== Minsk ===
In:

No.	Pos.	Nation	Player
1	GK	BLR	Uladzislaw Ihnatsyew (on loan from BATE Borisov)
3	DF	BLR	Ruslan Khadarkevich (from BATE Borisov)
10	MF	BLR	Dmitry Lisakovich (from (Kazakhstan) Shakhter Karagandy)
17	MF	BLR	Vladislav Varaksa (from Neman Grodno, previously on loan)
19	FW	BLR	Prokhor Struk (from ABFF U-17)
22	FW	BLR	Aleksandr Makas (from Isloch Minsk Raion)
29	MF	BLR	Ilya Dubinets (from Dinamo Minsk, previously on loan to Slutsk)
32	MF	CMR	Felix Abena (from (Latvia) Rēzekne)
33	DF	RUS	Konstantin Malitsky (from Lokomotiv Gomel)
44	FW	BLR	Mikita Ramanaw (from ABFF U-17)
49	MF	BLR	Andrey Denisyuk (from Shakhtyor Soligorsk)
66	DF	COL	Francisco Campo (from (Russia) Dynamo Makhachkala, previously on loan to (Kazakhstan) Shakhter Karagandy)
79	DF	BLR	Ilya Sviridenko (from Shakhtyor Soligorsk)
81	FW	BFA	Nabil Natama (from (Burkina Faso) Salitas)
99	MF	KGZ	Gulzhigit Borubayev (from (Kyrgyzstan) Alga Bishkek)
—	MF	BLR	Vladislav Ganchuk (end of loan to Energetik-BGU Minsk)

Out:

No.	Pos.	Nation	Player
3	DF	SRB	Ognjen Mažić
6	MF	BLR	Yevgeny Zemko (to (Russia) KDV Tomsk)
9	MF	BLR	Yegor Lapun (to Baranovichi)
11	MF	BLR	Fyodor Lebedev (to Slutsk)
14	MF	KAZ	Vladislav Vasilyev (to Dynamo Brest)
17	MF	BLR	Rodion Pechura (to (Russia) Kuban Krasnodar)
18	DF	BLR	Aleksandr Mikhalenko (to Arsenal Dzerzhinsk)
23	MF	BLR	Artur Nazarenko (to Neman Grodno)
44	DF	BLR	Gleb Krivtsov (to (Georgia (country)) Gonio)
71	FW	CTA	Moustapha Djimet (to Dinamo Minsk)
77	MF	BLR	Yevgeny Malashevich (to Dinamo Minsk)
99	MF	BLR	Ruslan Lisakovich (to Maxline Vitebsk)
—	FW	BLR	Ilya Bondarenko (on loan to Ostrovets)
—	DF	BLR	Fyodor Fedorovich (to Energetik-BGU Minsk, previously on loan)
—	MF	BLR	Kirill Goncharik (to Volna Pinsk, previously on loan to Molodechno)
—	MF	BLR	Artur Kuzmich (to Dnepr Rogachev, previously on loan to Smorgon)
—	MF	BLR	Ignat Pranovich (to Naftan Novopolotsk, previously on loan)
—	DF	BLR	Artyom Sakovich (to Energetik-BGU Minsk, previously on loan)

=== Molodechno ===
In:

No.	Pos.	Nation	Player
3	DF	BLR	Ilya Udodov (from Belshina Bobruisk)
6	FW	BLR	Maksim Budko (on loan from Dinamo Minsk)
10	FW	BLR	Dmitry Vashkevich (from (Russia) Dynamo Saint Petersburg)
12	GK	BLR	Pavel Okhremchuk (from Bumprom Gomel)
19	MF	BLR	Mark Tychko (on loan from Shakhtyor Soligorsk)
22	MF	BLR	Matvey Dukso (on loan from Dynamo Brest, previously on loan to Smorgon)
25	FW	BLR	Yevgeniy Azersky (from Lokomotiv Gomel)
29	MF	BLR	Maksim Samotoy (from Belshina Bobruisk)
37	MF	BLR	Vladislav Krolik (on loan from Dinamo Minsk)
43	GK	BLR	Denis Sadovsky (from Dnepr Mogilev)
77	DF	KAZ	Arsen Azatov (from (Kazakhstan) Kaisar)
91	MF	BLR	Dmitry Lesnyak (on loan from Dynamo Brest, previously on loan to Niva Dolbizno)

Out:

No.	Pos.	Nation	Player
7	MF	BLR	Gleb Guletsky
8	MF	BLR	Kirill Goncharik (end of loan from Minsk)
9	MF	BLR	Artem Zimin (to Belshina Bobruisk)
10	MF	BLR	Yury Kazlow (to Belshina Bobruisk)
11	FW	BLR	Vladislav Fedosov (to Dnepr Mogilev)
25	GK	BLR	Roman Stepanov (to (Georgia (country)) Gagra)
66	DF	TJK	Sino Absamadov (to Belshina Bobruisk)
73	MF	BLR	Yegor Nikoporenok (to Orsha)
88	MF	BLR	Dmitry German (to Volna Pinsk)
92	MF	BLR	Bogdan Kutsiy (end of loan from Shakhtyor Soligorsk)
97	MF	BLR	Vadim Fastovets
99	DF	BLR	Stanislav Bylinovich (end of loan from Shakhtyor Soligorsk)

=== Naftan Novopolotsk ===
In:

No.	Pos.	Nation	Player
1	GK	BLR	Artyom Denisenko (from (Poland) Zorza Mostki)
3	DF	BLR	Nikita Kostomarov (from Maxline Vitebsk)
8	MF	BLR	Kirill Yermakovich (from Gomel)
9	MF	BLR	Artyom Kuratnik (from Niva Dolbizno)
10	MF	UKR	Yevhen Protasov (from (Poland) Stilon Gorzów Wielkopolski)
11	MF	BLR	Ignat Pranovich (from Minsk, previously on loan)
12	DF	BLR	Artyom Zhvirblya (from Bumprom Gomel)
17	FW	BLR	Albert Kopytich (from Smorgon)
19	MF	BLR	Vladislav Kabyshev (from Shakhtyor Soligorsk)
20	FW	GEO	Nugzar Spanderashvili (from (Indonesia) Persikabo 1973)
31	FW	UZB	Ruslan Roziyev
66	MF	GUI	Yamoussa Camara (from Smorgon)
71	GK	BLR	Aleksandr Naumovich (from Gomel, previously on loan)
99	FW	BLR	Ivan Grudko (on loan from Slavia Mozyr)

Out:

No.	Pos.	Nation	Player
4	DF	BLR	Aleksandr Kuchinsky (to Belshina Bobruisk)
6	DF	BLR	Kirill Kovsh (end of loan from Dinamo Minsk)
9	MF	BLR	Dmitry Nizhnik (end of loan from Dinamo Minsk)
10	FW	UKR	Roman Paparyha (to (Uzbekistan) Qizilqum)
16	GK	BLR	Dmitry Say (to Smorgon)
17	MF	BLR	Anton Suchkow (end of loan from Neman Grodno)
21	FW	RUS	Maksim Zhitnev (to (Kazakhstan) Zhetysu)
23	FW	BLR	Ivan Tsikhanaw (on loan to Orsha)
31	FW	KEN	Josephat Lopaga (end of loan from Dynamo Brest)
33	MF	RUS	Georgiy Ermidis
79	MF	RUS	Khetag Badoev
99	FW	BLR	Marat Kalinchenko (to Bumprom Gomel)

=== Neman Grodno ===
In:

No.	Pos.	Nation	Player
6	MF	BLR	Artur Nazarenko (from Minsk)
7	MF	RUS	Yuri Klochkov (from Dnepr Mogilev)
9	MF	BLR	Sergey Pushnyakov (from Slutsk)
11	MF	RUS	Yuri Gavrilov (from Belshina Bobruisk)
16	DF	BLR	Nikita Bylinkin (from Slutsk)
19	DF	BLR	Konstantin Kuchinsky (from (Kazakhstan) Zhetysu)
21	MF	BLR	Alfred Mazurich (end of loan to Maxline Vitebsk)
27	DF	KGZ	Amantur Shamurzayev (from (Kyrgyzstan) Abdysh-Ata Kant)
33	MF	CTA	Isaac Ngoma (from (Central African Republic) Tempête Mocaf)
50	DF	BLR	Aleksey Shalashnikov (end of loan to Smorgon)
71	MF	BLR	Anton Suchkow (end of loan to Naftan Novopolotsk)

Out:

No.	Pos.	Nation	Player
4	DF	RUS	Andrei Vasilyev (to (Kazakhstan) Kyzylzhar)
9	MF	MDA	Igor Costrov (to BATE Borisov)
10	MF	KGZ	Gulzhigit Alykulov (to (Russia) Torpedo Moscow)
11	MF	BLR	Ilya Kukharchik (to Slavia Mozyr)
13	MF	BLR	Aleksey Dayneko (on loan to Smorgon)
14	DF	BLR	Alyaksandr Anyukevich (retired)
33	DF	BLR	Sergey Karpovich (to (Uzbekistan) Navbahor)
35	GK	BLR	Kirill Veydyger (on loan to Dnepr Mogilev)
55	DF	BLR	Aleksey Lavrik (to Dynamo Brest)
78	DF	BLR	Maksim Yablonsky (to Smorgon)
87	MF	IRN	Mehdi Ahmadi
90	DF	BLR	Uladzislaw Kasmynin (retired)
99	MF	BLR	Vladislav Varaksa (to Minsk, previously on loan)
—	DF	BLR	Maksim Katsynel (on loan to Lokomotiv Gomel, previously on loan to Belshina Bobruisk)
—	MF	BLR	Ilya Kirko (on loan to Baranovichi, previously on loan to Lokomotiv Gomel)
—	MF	BLR	Ilya Lebedev (to Slonim-2017, previously on loan)
—	GK	BLR	Nikita Matysyuk (on loan to ABFF U-19, previously from ABFF U-17)
—	MF	BLR	Yahor Pyatrow (to Slonim-2017, previously on loan)
—	DF	BLR	Vladimir Tonkevich (on loan to Smorgon, previously on loan to Lida)
—	MF	BLR	Marat Vasilkevich (on loan to Lida)

=== Slavia Mozyr ===
In:

No.	Pos.	Nation	Player
1	GK	BLR	Konstantin Veretynskiy (from Energetik-BGU Minsk)
3	DF	RUS	Vladislav Davydov (from Belshina Bobruisk)
5	MF	BLR	Mikhail Sachkovskiy (from Slutsk)
7	MF	BLR	Mikalay Ivanow (from Maxline Vitebsk)
8	MF	BLR	Ilya Kukharchik (from Neman Grodno)
11	FW	MDA	Andrei Cobeț (from Torpedo-BelAZ Zhodino)
18	DF	RUS	Nikita Melnikov (from (Russia) KAMAZ Naberezhnye Chelny)
22	MF	BLR	Anton Lukashov (from Dnepr Mogilev)
30	MF	BLR	Vitaly Likhtin (from Smorgon)
41	GK	BLR	Maksim Plotnikov (from Torpedo-BelAZ Zhodino)
44	FW	BLR	Terentiy Lutsevich (from Smorgon)
93	FW	RUS	Mikhail Markin (from Maxline Vitebsk)

Out:

No.	Pos.	Nation	Player
1	GK	RUS	Aleksei Kozlov (to (Kyrgyzstan) Neftchi Kochkor-Ata)
5	MF	BLR	Sergey Tikhonovsky (to Vitebsk)
15	DF	BLR	Andrey Shamruk (to Gomel)
16	GK	BLR	Danila Sokol (to BATE Borisov, previously on loan to Belshina Bobruisk)
20	FW	BLR	Ivan Grudko (on loan to Naftan Novopolotsk)
21	MF	KGZ	Ermek Kenzhebayev (on loan to (Kyrgyzstan) Bars Issyk-Kul)
25	DF	KAZ	Aleksandr Shirobokov (end of loan from (Kazakhstan) Kairat)
31	DF	BLR	Andrey Zaleski (to Isloch Minsk Raion)
58	MF	RUS	Maksim Khachatryan
63	FW	BLR	Kiryl Sidarenka (to (Russia) Dynamo Bryansk)
90	GK	BLR	Artem Makavchik (end of loan from Dinamo Minsk)
93	DF	RUS	Georgi Bugulov (to (Kazakhstan) Ulytau)
99	MF	NGA	Joseph Adah
—	FW	BLR	Danila Slesarchuk (to Smorgon, previously on loan to Lida)

=== Slutsk ===
In:

No.	Pos.	Nation	Player
3	DF	BLR	Matvey Dubatovka (on loan from Dinamo Minsk)
6	DF	BLR	Artem Tolkin (from Slonim-2017)
7	FW	UZB	Amirbek Bakayev (from Energetik-BGU Minsk)
9	FW	RUS	Ilya Grishchenko (on loan from Gomel)
10	FW	RUS	Maksim Zhumabekov (from (Russia) Khimik Dzerzhinsk)
11	MF	BLR	Fyodor Lebedev (from Minsk)
32	GK	BLR	Syarhey Chernik (from Shakhtyor Soligorsk)
35	GK	BLR	Matvey Kovruk (from Arsenal Dzerzhinsk)
44	DF	BLR	Igor Tymonyuk (from Belshina Bobruisk)
72	DF	BLR	Aleksandr Poznyak (from Arsenal Dzerzhinsk)
80	MF	BLR	Artyom Sokolovsky (on loan from Dinamo Minsk)
97	DF	BLR	Vasily Chernyavsky (on loan from Dinamo Minsk)

Out:

No.	Pos.	Nation	Player
1	GK	BLR	Daniil Perov (to Baranovichi)
2	DF	BLR	Vladislav Karpenya (to Baranovichi)
6	MF	BLR	Mikhail Sachkovskiy (to Slavia Mozyr)
7	MF	BLR	Sergey Pushnyakov (to Neman Grodno)
9	MF	BLR	Vladislav Sychev (on loan to Lokomotiv Gomel)
10	MF	BLR	Kirill Tsepenkov (to Dinamo Minsk)
11	FW	RUS	Nikita Melnikov (to (Indonesia) Persikabo 1973)
12	DF	BLR	Nikita Bylinkin (to Neman Grodno)
29	MF	BLR	Ilya Dubinets (end of loan from Dinamo Minsk)
31	FW	BLR	Arseniy Achapovskiy (to Belshina Bobruisk)
44	GK	BLR	Denis Shpakovsky (end of loan from Dinamo Minsk)
77	DF	BLR	Ivan Yurin (to Spartak Minsk)
78	DF	BLR	Vladislav Kovalevich (to Belshina Bobruisk)

=== Smorgon ===
In:

No.	Pos.	Nation	Player
1	GK	BLR	Aleksey Koltygin (from Volna Pinsk)
4	DF	CIV	Moussa Diallo
5	DF	BLR	Aleksey Firsov (from Baranovichi)
6	MF	CIV	Sékou Doumbia
8	MF	BLR	Vladimir Maslovskiy (from Isloch Minsk Raion)
9	FW	BLR	Vladislav Chebotar (from Volna Pinsk)
10	FW	UZB	Saidumar Sodiqov (from (Kyrgyzstan) OshSU-Aldier)
11	FW	BLR	Danila Slesarchuk (from Slavia Mozyr, previously on loan to Lida)
13	MF	BLR	Aleksey Dayneko (on loan from Neman Grodno)
16	GK	BLR	Dmitry Say (from Naftan Novopolotsk)
17	MF	BLR	Yegor Mychelkin (on loan from Torpedo-BelAZ Zhodino)
20	DF	BLR	Vladimir Tonkevich (on loan from Neman Grodno, previously on loan to Lida)
21	MF	RUS	Rodion Yezhov (from (Russia) FShM Moscow)
26	DF	CIV	Koffi Bini (from (Philippines) Maharlika)
63	FW	TJK	Alisher Rakhimov
77	DF	BLR	Ilya Bogdanovich (on loan from Dynamo Brest, previously on loan to Belshina Bobruisk)
78	DF	BLR	Maksim Yablonsky (from Neman Grodno)

Out:

No.	Pos.	Nation	Player
1	GK	BLR	Ivan Novichkov (end of loan from Vitebsk)
4	DF	BLR	Aleksey Shalashnikov (end of loan from Neman Grodno)
5	DF	CIV	Abdoul Aziz Touré (to (Kazakhstan) Kyzylzhar)
6	MF	BLR	Pavel Seleznyov (to Belshina Bobruisk)
7	FW	BLR	Albert Kopytich (to Naftan Novopolotsk)
9	DF	BLR	Artem Glotko (to Energetik-BGU Minsk)
10	MF	BLR	Kirill Leonovich (to Vitebsk)
11	FW	BLR	Vladislav Dalidovich (to Viktoriya Maryina Gorka)
15	MF	BLR	Artur Kuzmich (end of loan from Minsk)
16	GK	BLR	Anton Velesyuk
17	MF	BLR	Matvey Dukso (end of loan from Dynamo Brest)
19	MF	CIV	Rayan Guibero (to BATE Borisov)
22	MF	BLR	Albert Mikhaylov
23	FW	BLR	Pavel Gorbach (to Belshina Bobruisk)
27	MF	BLR	Maksim Gayevoy (to Arsenal Dzerzhinsk)
30	MF	BLR	Vitaly Likhtin (to Slavia Mozyr)
35	DF	RUS	Vasili Ilik (to (Russia) Dynamo Barnaul, previously from (Russia) Astrakhan)
44	FW	BLR	Terentiy Lutsevich (to Slavia Mozyr)
72	DF	KAZ	Mikael Askarov (to (Kazakhstan) Atyrau)
89	MF	GUI	Yamoussa Camara (to Naftan Novopolotsk)
—	DF	BLR	Maksim Avgustinovich (retired, previously on loan to Ostrovets)
—	DF	BLR	Vadim Dak (to Ostrovets, previously on loan)

=== Torpedo-BelAZ Zhodino ===
In:

No.	Pos.	Nation	Player
7	MF	MLI	Mamadou Camara (on loan from (Russia) Torpedo Moscow)
8	MF	BLR	Aleksandr Selyava (from Dinamo Minsk)
11	MF	BRA	Caio Dantas (on loan from (Russia) Torpedo Moscow)
14	MF	TKM	Teýmur Çaryýew (from (Kyrgyzstan) Abdysh-Ata Kant)
17	MF	BLR	Pavel Sedko (from Dinamo Minsk)
32	DF	BLR	Arseny Ageyev (on loan from (Russia) Lokomotiv Moscow, previously on loan to Arsenal Dzerzhinsk)
35	GK	BLR	Igor Malaschitskiy (on loan from Shakhtyor Soligorsk)
66	DF	BLR	Sergey Politevich (from Dinamo Minsk)
72	MF	RUS	Aleksandr Orekhov (on loan from (Russia) Torpedo Moscow)
88	DF	RUS	Kirill Glushchenkov (on loan from (Russia) Pari Nizhny Novgorod)

Out:

No.	Pos.	Nation	Player
7	FW	MDA	Andrei Cobeț (to Slavia Mozyr)
11	DF	BLR	Denis Levitsky (to Maxline Vitebsk)
13	DF	BLR	Aleksey Zalesky (to Maxline Vitebsk)
14	FW	RUS	Stanislav Ruban (end of loan from (Russia) Stroitel Kamensk-Shakhtinsky)
17	MF	BLR	Anton Kavalyow (to (Russia) Fakel Voronezh)
18	MF	BLR	Nikita Patsko (to Isloch Minsk Raion)
28	DF	SRB	Saša Domić
37	GK	BLR	Pavel Prishivalko (to Lokomotiv Gomel)
49	GK	BLR	Maksim Plotnikov (to Slavia Mozyr)
51	FW	BLR	Denis Laptev (to Dynamo Brest)
55	MF	BLR	Aleksandr Ksenofontov (to Vitebsk)
97	MF	BLR	Maksim Myakish (to Dinamo Minsk)
—	MF	BLR	Arseny Galushko (to Lida)
—	DF	BLR	Eduard Korostelyov (on loan to Lokomotiv Gomel)
—	DF	BLR	Vladimir Manayev (on loan to Lida)
—	MF	BLR	Yegor Mychelkin (on loan to Smorgon)
—	DF	BLR	Matvey Sokolovsky (on loan to Ostrovets)

=== Vitebsk ===
In:

No.	Pos.	Nation	Player
10	MF	BLR	Kirill Leonovich (from Smorgon)
11	FW	CIV	Cédric Khaleb Kouadio
26	MF	BLR	Sergey Tikhonovsky (from Slavia Mozyr)
33	DF	BLR	Yaroslav Makushinsky (from (Uzbekistan) Buxoro)
37	FW	RUS	Dmitry Radikovsky (on loan from (Russia) Lokomotiv Moscow)
60	GK	BLR	Ivan Novichkov (end of loan to Smorgon)
80	MF	BLR	Aleksandr Ksenofontov (from Torpedo-BelAZ Zhodino)
—	FW	CMR	Brian Onana

Out:

No.	Pos.	Nation	Player
2	DF	BLR	Yevgeniy Guletsky (to (Armenia) Alashkert)
4	DF	BLR	Artsyom Skitaw (retired)
10	FW	BLR	Karen Vardanyan (to Dinamo Minsk)
21	DF	RUS	Yuriy Polovinkin (retired)
25	MF	RUS	Vadim Tkachenko (on loan to Belshina Bobruisk)
37	FW	RUS	Mark Krasnov (to (Kyrgyzstan) Neftchi Kochkor-Ata)
43	DF	UZB	Javokhir Utamurodov (to (Uzbekistan) Buxoro)
—	DF	BLR	Nikita Bykov (to Maxline Vitebsk)
—	FW	BLR	Vladislav Pulkach (on loan to ABFF U-19)
—	MF	BLR	Dzmitry Varabyow
