= 2025 Belarusian Premier League =

Belarusian Premier League
- Season: 2025
- Dates: 13 March – 30 November
- Champions: Maxline Vitebsk; 1st Premier League title
- Relegated: Smorgon; Slutsk; Molodechno
- Champions League: Maxline Vitebsk
- Conference League: Dinamo Minsk
- Matches: 240
- Goals: 611 (2.55 per match)
- Top goalscorer: Aleksandr Shestyuk (17 goals)
- Biggest home win: Dinamo Brest 5–0 Minsk (17 May 2025); Dinamo Minsk 5–0 Dinamo Brest (28 June 2025); Naftan 5–0 Molodechno (19 September 2025); Maxline Vitebsk 5–0 Gomel (23 November 2025); BATE 5–0 Naftan (23 November 2025)
- Biggest away win: Molodechno 0–4 Vitebsk (19 April 2025); BATE 1–5 Neman (14 June 2025); Minsk 1–5 Torpedo-BelAZ (14 June 2025); Smorgon 0–4 Isloch (20 June 2025); BATE 1–5 Vitebsk (1 August 2025); Arsenal 0–4 Maxline Vitebsk (10 August 2025)
- Highest scoring: Naftan 5–3 Gomel (4 October 2025)
- Longest winning run: 6 matches Maxline Vitebsk
- Longest unbeaten run: 20 matches Maxline Vitebsk
- Longest winless run: 13 matches Molodechno
- Longest losing run: 12 matches Molodechno
- Highest attendance: 10,009; Dinamo Brest 3–1 Slavia (3 May 2025)
- Lowest attendance: 93; Arsenal 0–1 Isloch (17 October 2025); Arsenal 0–0 Gomel (2 November 2025)
- Total attendance: 533,230
- Average attendance: 2,222

The 2025 Belarusian Premier League is the 35th season of top-tier football in Belarus. Maxline Vitebsk won the Belarusian Premier League title for the first time as a newly promoted side.

== Teams ==
The bottom-placed teams from the 2024 season (Dnepr Mogilev and Shakhtyor Soligorsk) were relegated to the First League. They were replaced by Molodechno and Maxline Vitebsk, champions and runners-up of the 2024 Belarusian First League respectively.

14th-placed team of the last season (Naftan Novopolotsk) defended their spot in Premier League by defeating Niva Dolbizno in relegation/promotion playoffs.

Team	Location	Venue	Capacity	Position in 2024
Arsenal	Dzerzhinsk	City Stadium	1,000	10th
BATE	Borisov	Borisov Arena	13,126	8th
Dinamo Brest	Brest	OSK Brestsky	10,037	4th
Dinamo Minsk	Minsk	Dinamo Stadium	22,246	1st
Gomel	Gomel	Central Stadium	14,307	6th
Isloch	Minsk	FC Minsk Stadium	3,050	7th
Maxline Vitebsk	Vitebsk	Vitebsky CSK	8,144	2nd (First League)
Minsk	Minsk	FC Minsk Stadium	3,050	13th
Molodechno	Molodechno	City Stadium	4,560	1st (First League)
Naftan	Novopolotsk	Atlant Stadium	4,522	14th
Neman	Grodno	Neman Stadium	8,479	2nd
Slavia	Mozyr	Yunost Stadium	5,300	11th
Slutsk	Slutsk	City Stadium	1,896	9th
Smorgon	Smorgon	Yunost Stadium	3,200	12th
Torpedo-BelAZ	Zhodino	Torpedo Stadium	6,524	3rd
Vitebsk	Vitebsk	Vitebsky CSK	8,144	5th

Locations of the 2025 Belarusian Premier League teams

== League table ==
Pos	Team	Pld	W	D	L	GF	GA	GD	Pts	Qualification or relegation
1	Maxline Vitebsk (C)	30	21	5	4	53	18	+35	68	Qualification for the Champions League first qualifying round
2	Dinamo Minsk	30	19	6	5	52	27	+25	63	Qualification for the Conference League first qualifying round
3	Slavia Mozyr	30	17	6	7	53	32	+21	57	
4	Dynamo Brest	30	15	6	9	42	30	+12	51	
5	Minsk	30	15	6	9	48	47	+1	51	
6	Torpedo-BelAZ Zhodino	30	13	10	7	43	30	+13	49	
7	Isloch Minsk Raion	30	12	13	5	45	26	+19	49	
8	Neman Grodno	30	14	3	13	41	31	+10	45	
9	Gomel	30	12	7	11	35	34	+1	43	
10	BATE Borisov	30	11	7	12	38	43	−5	40	Qualification for the Conference League first qualifying round (Note: The winners of the 2025-26 Belarusian Cup (BATE Borisov) also qualify for the Conference League first qualifying round.)
11	Arsenal Dzerzhinsk	30	7	12	11	27	35	−8	33	
12	Vitebsk	30	9	4	17	37	46	−9	28 (Note: Decision of the ABFF Control and Disciplinary and Ethics Committee dated 12.11.2025, football club "Vitebsk" was deprived of 3 tournament points in the Football Championship of the Republic of Belarus 2025 among the top league teams.)	
13	Naftan Novopolotsk	30	8	4	18	35	55	−20	28	
14	Smorgon (R)	30	7	7	16	23	43	−20	28	Qualification for the Belarusian Premier League play-off
15	Slutsk (R)	30	5	6	19	20	51	−31	21	Relegation to the Belarusian First League
16	Molodechno (R)	30	3	2	25	19	63	−44	11	Relegation to the Belarusian First League

Source: football.by
Rules for classification: 1) Points; 2) Head-to-head points; 3) Head-to-head goal difference; 4) Head-to-head goals scored; 5) Goal difference; 6) Matches won; 7) Goals scored.
(C) Champions; (R) Relegated

== Results ==
Each team plays home-and-away once against every other team for a total of 30 matches played each.

Home \ Away	ARS	BAT	DBR	DMI	GOM	ISL	MAX	FCM	MOL	NAF	NEM	SLA	SLU	SMR	TZH	VIT
Arsenal Dzerzhinsk	—	0–1	1–1	2–1	0–0	0–1	0–4	1–1	3–0	0–1	0–3	1–0	2–1	1–1	1–1	1–1
BATE Borisov	0–0	—	2–4	2–2	0–0	0–1	1–0	0–2	2–1	5–0	1–5	1–1	2–0	2–2	1–0	1–5
Dynamo Brest	1–1	3–0	—	0–2	0–1	1–2	0–2	5–0	1–0	2–0	2–0	3–1	3–0	2–0	0–0	2–1
Dinamo Minsk	1–0	2–1	5–0	—	0–0	2–1	1–1	4–1	3–2	1–0	0–1	3–1	3–1	1–0	4–0	2–1
Gomel	0–2	2–3	3–0	0–1	—	0–0	0–2	1–1	2–1	2–0	3–1	0–1	4–1	3–1	1–1	1–0
Isloch Minsk Raion	4–0	2–0	1–1	2–2	1–1	—	0–1	1–1	4–0	3–0	2–0	2–2	0–0	0–0	1–3	3–0
Maxline Vitebsk	2–2	2–1	1–1	2–0	5–0	3–1	—	4–1	0–0	2–0	1–0	2–3	1–0	3–1	0–1	2–0
Minsk	2–2	2–0	1–0	2–1	1–0	0–1	1–2	—	3–2	1–2	1–4	2–2	3–0	2–2	1–5	2–1
Molodechno	0–1	0–1	0–1	1–3	0–1	0–1	0–1	1–3	—	0–2	3–2	0–2	0–1	2–1	1–2	0–4
Naftan Novopolotsk	2–0	2–2	2–2	1–3	5–3	2–2	0–3	0–3	5–0	—	1–3	0–1	1–2	3–1	0–3	3–0
Neman Grodno	1–0	0–2	0–1	0–0	0–1	2–0	3–1	2–1	3–0	1–0	—	1–2	2–1	0–1	1–1	3–1
Slavia Mozyr	1–1	1–1	0–1	3–0	2–1	1–1	0–2	2–3	4–1	2–0	2–1	—	2–0	3–1	1–0	4–0
Slutsk	0–3	0–3	0–2	0–1	0–3	1–1	0–1	1–2	2–2	1–0	2–1	1–2	—	2–0	0–0	0–1
Smorgon	1–1	1–0	1–0	1–2	3–1	0–4	0–1	0–2	1–0	1–1	1–0	0–2	0–0	—	0–1	0–2
Torpedo-BelAZ Zhodino	2–1	3–2	2–0	0–0	0–1	0–0	1–1	0–1	4–1	4–2	0–1	3–2	2–2	0–1	—	3–2
Vitebsk	1–0	0–1	1–3	1–2	2–0	3–3	0–1	1–2	0–1	2–0	0–0	0–3	4–1	2–1	1–1	—

Source: football.by
Legend: Blue = home team win; Yellow = draw; Red = away team win.

== Belarusian Premier League play-off ==
The fourteenth-placed team (Smorgon) faced the fourth-placed team of the 2025 Belarusian First League (Belshina Bobruisk) in a two-legged play-off for the final place in the 2026 Belarusian Premier League (third-placed First League team Lokomotiv Gomel were ineligible for promotion).

=== First leg ===
3 December 2025	Smorgon	1–0	Belshina Bobruisk	Smorgon
13:30 GMT+3	Aleksey Dayneko 10'	Report		Stadium: Yunost Stadium; Attendance: 469; Referee: Dmitriy Dmitriev

=== Second leg ===
6 December 2025	Belshina Bobruisk	1–0 (a.e.t.) (6–5 p)	Smorgon	Bobruisk
14:00 GMT+3	Vladislav Solanovich 81'	Report		Stadium: Aleksandr Prokopenko Stadium; Attendance: 1,200; Referee: Sergey Stetsurin
	Penalties
	Pavel Seleznev (penalty missed); Arseniy Achapovskiy (penalty scored); Vadim Balbukh (penalty scored); Nikita Golub (penalty scored); Vladislav Solanovich (penalty scored); Pavel Dubovskiy (penalty scored); Ilya Vikhrov (penalty scored)		Sékou Doumbia (penalty missed); Ilya Bogdanovich (penalty scored); Alikhan Fazylov (penalty scored); Aleksey Dayneko (penalty scored); Vladimir Maslovskiy (penalty scored); Vladislav Chebotar (penalty scored); Vladimir Tonkevich (penalty missed)

Belshina Bobruisk won 1–1 (6–5 p) on aggregate.

== Season statistics ==
=== Top scorers ===
Rank	Player	Club	Goals
1	(Football Federation of Belarus) Aleksandr Shestyuk	Isloch Minsk Raion	17
2	(Football Federation of Belarus) Andrey Solovey	Slavia Mozyr	16
3	(Russian Football Union) Yegor Kortsov	Dynamo Brest	11
4	(Football Federation of Belarus) Pavel Sedko	Torpedo-BelAZ Zhodino	10
4	(Football Federation of Belarus) Karen Vardanyan	Dinamo Minsk	10
6	(Football Federation of Belarus) Mikhail Gordeychuk	Dynamo Brest	9
7	(Russian Football Union) Nikita Glushkov	Maxline Vitebsk	8
7	(Football Federation of Belarus) Aleksandr Makas	Minsk	8
7	(Football Federation of Belarus) Vladislav Poloz	Slavia Mozyr	8
7	(Uzbekistan Football Association) Ruslan Roziyev	Naftan Novopolotsk	8

=== Top assists ===
Rank	Player	Club	Assists
1	(Russian Football Union) Yegor Kortsov	Dynamo Brest	11
2	(Football Federation of Belarus) Ruslan Lisakovich	Maxline Vitebsk	9
3	(Ukrainian Association of Football) Yevhen Protasov	Naftan Novopolotsk	7
3	(Football Federation of Belarus) Yevgeny Krasnov	Vitebsk	7
3	(Football Federation of Belarus) Maksim Kovalevich	Isloch Minsk Raion	7
3	(Nigeria Football Federation) Raymond Adeola	Gomel	7
7	(Football Federation of Belarus) Terentiy Lutsevich	Slavia Mozyr	6
7	(Football Federation of Belarus) Mikalay Ivanow	Slavia Mozyr	6
9	(Football Federation of Belarus) Ilya Kukharchik	Slavia Mozyr	5
9	(Football Federation of Belarus) Mikhail Gordeychuk	Dynamo Brest	5
9	(Football Federation of Belarus) Kirill Tsepenkov	Dinamo Minsk	5
9	(Football Federation of Belarus) Yevgeny Malashevich	Dinamo Minsk	5
9	(Football Federation of Belarus) Vladislav Poloz	Slavia Mozyr	5
9	(Russian Football Union) Nikita Glushkov	Maxline Vitebsk	5

=== Hat-tricks ===
Player	For	Against	Result	Date
(Moldova) Vicu Bulmaga	Isloch Minsk Raion	Molodechno	4–0 (H)	27 April 2025
(Belarus) Karen Vardanyan	Dinamo Minsk	Dynamo Brest	5–0 (H)	28 June 2025
(Uzbekistan) Ruslan Roziyev	Naftan Novopolotsk	Gomel	5–3 (H)	4 October 2025
(Belarus) Vladislav Yatskevich	BATE Borisov	Naftan Novopolotsk	5–0 (H)	23 November 2025

=== Clean sheets ===
Rank	Player	Club	Clean sheets
1	(Football Federation of Belarus) Pavel Pavlyuchenko	Maxline Vitebsk	17
2	(Football Federation of Belarus) Andrey Klimovich	Isloch Minsk Raion	11
3	(Football Federation of Belarus) Mikhail Kozakevich	Dynamo Brest	10
3	(Football Federation of Belarus) Maksim Plotnikov	Slavia Mozyr	10
5	(Football Federation of Belarus) Stanislav Kleshchuk	Gomel	8
6	(Football Federation of Belarus) Maksim Belov	Neman Grodno	7
6	(Football Federation of Belarus) Artyom Soroko	Arsenal Dzerzhinsk	7
8	(Football Federation of Belarus) Vladislav Vasilyuchek	Smorgon	6
8	(Football Federation of Belarus) Danila Sokol	BATE Borisov	6
10	(Russian Football Union) Ivan Konovalov	Dinamo Minsk	5
10	(Football Federation of Belarus) Arseniy Skopets	BATE Borisov	5
10	(Football Federation of Belarus) Yevgeniy Abramovich	Torpedo-BelAZ Zhodino	5
10	(Football Federation of Belarus) Alyaksandr Nyachayew	Gomel	5

=== Discipline ===
==== Player ====
- Most yellow cards: 9
  - (Guinea) Yamoussa Camara (Naftan Novopolotsk)
- Most red cards: 2
  - (Belarus) Kirill Leonovich (Vitebsk (1) & Naftan Novopolotsk (1))
  - (Belarus) Igor Zayats (Gomel)

==== Club ====
- Most yellow cards: 63
  - BATE Borisov
  - Smorgon
- Most red cards: 4
  - Vitebsk
  - Smorgon

=== Attendances ===
#	Football club	Average attendance
1	Dynamo Brest	6,741
2	Maxline Vitebsk	4,245
3	Dinamo Minsk	4,049
4	Slavia Mozyr	3,098
5	Neman Grodno	2,966
6	BATE Borisov	2,871
7	Gomel	2,306
8	Torpedo-BelAZ Zhodino	2,149
9	Vitebsk	1,389
10	Smorgon	1,321
11	Slutsk	1,200
12	FC Minsk	812
13	Naftan Novopolotsk	722
14	Molodechno	672
15	Isloch	576
16	Arsenal Dzerzhinsk	432

== See also ==
- 2025 Belarusian First League
