= 2026 Belarusian Premier League =

Belarusian Premier League
- Season: 2026
- Dates: 20 March – 29 November 2026
- Relegated: Naftan
- All statistics correct as of 24 May 2026.

The 2026 Belarusian Premier League, also known as Betera Vyšejšaja Liha sponsorship reasons, is the 36th season of top-tier football in Belarus. Maxline Vitebsk enter the season as defending champions after winning their first title in 2025 as a newly promoted side.

== Teams ==
Three teams were relegated following the 2025 Belarusian Premier League season: Molodechno and Slutsk were relegated directly as the bottom two teams, while Smorgon was relegated after losing the promotion/relegation play-off.

They were replaced by three teams from the 2025 Belarusian First League: Baranovichi and Dnepr Mogilev, the champions and runners-up respectively, and Belshina Bobruisk, who won the promotion play-off.

Team	Location	Venue	Capacity	Position in 2025
Arsenal	Dzerzhinsk	City Stadium	1,000	10th
Baranovichi	Baranovichi	Lokomotiv Stadium	3,749	1st (First League)
BATE	Borisov	Borisov Arena	13,126	7th
Belshina Bobruisk	Bobruisk	Spartak Stadium	3,700	4th (First League)
Dinamo Brest	Brest	OSK Brestsky	10,037	5th
Dinamo Minsk	Minsk	Dinamo Stadium	22,246	2nd
Dnepr Mogilev	Mogilev	Spartak Stadium	7,350	2nd (First League)
Gomel	Gomel	Central Stadium	14,307	6th
Isloch	Minsk	FC Minsk Stadium	3,050	9th
Maxline Vitebsk	Vitebsk	Vitebsky CSK	8,144	1st
Minsk	Minsk	Traktar Stadium	5,600	12th
Naftan	Novopolotsk	Atlant Stadium	4,522	13th
Neman	Grodno	Neman Stadium	8,479	4th
Slavia	Mozyr	Yunost Stadium	5,300	3rd
Torpedo-BelAZ	Zhodino	Torpedo Stadium	6,524	8th
Vitebsk	Vitebsk	Vitebsky CSK	8,144	11th

Locations of the 2026 Belarusian Premier League teams

== League table ==
Pos	Team	Pld	W	D	L	GF	GA	GD	Pts	Qualification or relegation
1	Maxline Vitebsk (X)	28	18	8	2	61	19	+42	62	Qualification for the Champions League first qualifying round
2	Isloch Minsk Raion (X)	28	18	7	3	54	23	+31	61	Qualification for the Conference League first qualifying round
3	Dinamo Minsk (X)	28	19	4	5	51	23	+28	61	Qualification for the Conference League first qualifying round
4	Dynamo Brest	29	16	6	7	54	30	+24	54	
5	Neman Grodno	28	15	4	9	35	26	+9	49	
6	Gomel	29	13	7	9	43	30	+13	46	
7	Vitebsk	29	11	7	11	30	29	+1	40	
8	Torpedo-BelAZ Zhodino	28	10	6	12	35	36	−1	36	
9	Minsk	28	10	5	13	35	42	−7	35	
10	Slavia Mozyr	28	9	7	12	36	38	−2	34	
11	Baranovichi	29	8	7	14	30	46	−16	31	
12	Arsenal Dzerzhinsk	28	6	9	13	25	46	−21	27	
13	Belshina Bobruisk	29	7	6	16	31	53	−22	27	
14	Dnepr Mogilev	29	5	11	13	29	43	−14	26	Qualification for the Relegation play-off
15	BATE Borisov	29	5	9	15	21	37	−16	24	Relegation to the Belarusian First League
16	Naftan Novopolotsk (R)	29	4	5	20	25	74	−49	17	Relegation to the Belarusian First League

Updated to match(es) played on 21 November 2026. Source: Soccerway
Rules for classification: 1) Points; 2) Head-to-head points; 3) Head-to-head goal difference; 4) Head-to-head goals scored; 5) Goal difference; 6) Matches won; 7) Goals scored.
(R) Relegated; (X) Guaranteed at least Conference League

== Results ==
Each team plays home-and-away once against every other team for a total of 30 matches played each.

Home \ Away	ARS	BAR	BAT	BEL	DBR	DMI	DNE	GOM	ISL	MAX	FCM	NAF	NEM	SLA	TZH	VIT
Arsenal Dzerzhinsk	—	0–0	1–0	2–0	0–1	0–1	0–0	1–1	2–2	0–3	1–2	2–0	21 Nov	1–3	2–4	0–3
Baranovichi	1–1	—	2–2	0–1	1–1	2–3	2–1	0–2	3–4	0–4	2–1	3–0	1–2	1–1	1–0	0–1
BATE Borisov	2–3	3–0	—	0–1	0–3	0–0	1–1	0–1	28 Nov	1–2	2–1	2–2	0–2	2–1	1–0	1–0
Belshina Bobruisk	2–0	1–1	1–1	—	1–0	2–3	1–2	0–2	2–3	28 Nov	2–0	5–1	2–2	2–4	0–2	1–0
Dynamo Brest	3–0	3–0	1–0	4–0	—	1–2	4–2	2–2	1–2	1–3	0–0	4–1	1–3	4–1	0–2	3–1
Dinamo Minsk	2–0	0–1	2–0	2–0	0–1	—	3–1	2–1	1–1	2–3	21 Nov	5–1	0–1	3–1	4–0	1–1
Dnepr Mogilev	0–1	0–0	2–1	1–1	1–1	2–3	—	2–1	0–0	1–1	1–2	3–3	2–0	0–1	2–2	2–0
Gomel	2–0	2–3	3–1	1–0	2–1	1–2	2–0	—	2–0	1–5	0–1	6–0	1–1	3–1	1–1	0–1
Isloch Minsk Raion	1–1	2–0	2–0	4–0	0–1	1–0	2–1	2–1	—	1–0	4–2	3–1	1–2	3–1	21 Nov	3–0
Maxline Vitebsk	5–1	2–0	0–0	1–1	0–0	0–0	5–1	0–0	1–1	—	4–0	2–1	1–0	21 Nov	2–0	1–2
Minsk	1–1	1–3	1–0	5–1	2–2	0–3	28 Nov	2–0	1–1	2–2	—	4–2	0–1	1–0	0–1	0–1
Naftan Novopolotsk	3–0	1–0	0–0	4–1	2–4	28 Nov	0–0	0–2	0–6	0–5	0–3	—	0–2	0–1	0–4	1–1
Neman Grodno	0–1	3–0	0–0	2–1	1–4	1–3	2–1	28 Nov	0–1	1–2	2–1	3–1	—	1–0	1–0	2–0
Slavia Mozyr	1–1	2–0	1–1	2–1	28 Nov	1–2	3–0	0–0	0–2	2–4	1–2	0–1	0–0	—	4–2	3–0
Torpedo-BelAZ Zhodino	3–3	28 Nov	3–0	3–0	0–1	0–1	0–0	1–2	0–2	0–1	3–0	1–0	1–0	1–1	—	1–1
Vitebsk	28 Nov	2–3	1–0	1–1	1–2	0–1	1–0	1–1	0–0	0–2	2–0	2–0	1–0	0–0	6–0	—

Updated to match(es) played on 21 November 2026. Source: football.by
Legend: Blue = home team win; Yellow = draw; Red = away team win.

== Season statistics ==
=== Top scorers ===
Rank	Player	Club	Goals
1	(Belarus) Timofey Simanenka	Gomel	14
2	(Russia) Yegor Kortsov	Dynamo Brest	13
3	(Belarus) Artem Kontsevoy	Maxline Vitebsk	11
4	(Mali) Bassekou Diabaté	Maxline Vitebsk	10
4	(Belarus) Andrey Solovey	Slavia Mozyr	10
4	(Belarus) Karen Vardanyan	Dinamo Minsk	10
4	(Belarus) Yevgeny Yudchits	Isloch Minsk Raion	10
8	(Belarus) Aleksandr Svirepa	Isloch Minsk Raion	9
8	(Belarus) Yevgeny Malashevich	Dinamo Minsk	9
8	(Belarus) Aleksandr Butko	Isloch Minsk Raion	9

== See also ==
- 2026 Belarusian First League
