= 2025–26 Belarusian Cup =

Tournament details
- Country: Belarus
- Dates: 3 May 2025 – 16 May 2026

Final positions
- Champions: BATE Borisov
- Runners-up: Dinamo Minsk

The 2025–26 Belarusian Cup was the 35th season of Belarus's annual knock-out cup football competition. The cup began on 3 April 2025 and seven rounds are playing before the final, which took place on 16 May 2026. The winners will qualify for the 2026–27 Conference League first qualifying round.

Defending champions Neman Grodno reached the round of 32 of this year's competition but were eliminated by Slonim-2017.

== First round ==
The draw was made on 23 April 2025.

Teams were split into six regions:

- Brest Region
- Vitebsk Region
- Gomel Region
- Grodno Region
- Minsk
- Mogilev Region

=== Brest Region ===
Team 1	Score	Team 2
9 May 2025
Agro-Pelishche	6–1	Ivatsevichi
Inform	6–3	Kommunalnik Beloozersk
10 May 2025
Krechet Bereza	2–1	Novaya Pripyat Olshany
Stanles Pinsk	5–1	Atlant Kobrin
11 May 2025
Ivanovo	2–8	Nadezhda Baranovichi

=== Vitebsk Region ===
Team 1	Score	Team 2
9 May 2025
Gazovik Vitebsk	3–1	Postavy
11 May 2025
Polotsk-2019	4–3	Niva Tolochin
Miory	Bye	

=== Gomel Region ===
Team 1	Score	Team 2
10 May 2025
MNPZ Mozyr	3–1	Leskhoz Gomel

=== Grodno Region ===
Team 1	Score	Team 2
9 May 2025
Masty	5–1	Oshmyany
11 May 2025
Neman-Belcard Grodno	0–1	Svisloch
13 May 2025
Shchuchin	2–5	D-Media

=== Minsk ===
Team 1	Score	Team 2
3 May 2025
Energetik-BGU Minsk	4–1	BGU Minsk
8 May 2025
Urozhaynaya	0–2	Krumkachy Minsk
11 May 2025
Energetik	0–1	Bobovnya

=== Mogilev Region ===
Team 1	Score	Team 2
9 May 2025
Drut Belynichi	5–3	Gorki
11 May 2025
Tekhnolog-BGUT Mogilev	4–1	Atom Mogilev

== Second round ==
The draw was made on 15 May 2025.

Team 1	Score	Team 2
20 May 2025
Tekhnolog-BGUT Mogilev	0–6	D-Media
21 May 2025
Agro-Pelishche	0–2	Energetik-BGU Minsk
Miory	0–4	Niva Dolbizno
Polotsk-2019	0–5	Baranovichi
22 May 2025
Bobovnya	1–2	Krumkachy Minsk
Stanles Pinsk	0–3	Volna Pinsk
28 May 2025
Gazovik Vitebsk	0–7	Ostrovets
MNPZ Mozyr	0–6	Lokomotiv Gomel
Drut Belynichi	0–2	Orsha
Nadezhda Baranovichi	0–2	Unixlabs Minsk
Inform	0–6	Lida
Svisloch	1–4	Slonim-2017
Krechet Bereza	0–4	Osipovichi
Masty	0–4	Bumprom Gomel

== Round of 32 ==
The 16 second round winners and the 16 teams from the 2024 Belarusian Premier League entered the Round of 32. The draw was made on 29 May 2025.

Team 1	Score	Team 2
17 June 2025
Orsha	1–8	Dynamo Brest
18 June 2025
Bumprom Gomel	0–2	Torpedo-BelAZ Zhodino
11 July 2025
Volna Pinsk	2–3	Minsk
12 July 2025
Niva Dolbizno	0–4	Isloch Minsk Raion
Osipovichi	1–5	Slavia Mozyr
D-Media	0–2	Gomel
Dnepr Mogilev	0–1	Vitebsk
13 July 2025
Energetik-BGU Minsk	0–1	BATE Borisov
Lida	0:1	Arsenal Dzerzhinsk
Baranovichi	1–2 (a.e.t.)	Maxline Vitebsk
Unixlabs Minsk	0–2	Smorgon
Ostrovets	0–3	Slutsk
Krumkachy Minsk	1–2 (a.e.t.)	Naftan Novopolotsk
14 July 2025
Belshina Bobruisk	0–3	Molodechno-2018
19 August 2025
Lokomotiv Gomel	1–2	Dinamo Minsk
12 November 2025
Slonim-2017	0–0 (5–4 p)	Neman Grodno

== Round of 16 ==
The 16 Round of 32 winners entered the Round of 16. The draw was made on 16 July 2025.

Team 1	Score	Team 2
25 July 2025
Naftan Novopolotsk	3–4 (a.e.t.)	BATE Borisov
26 July 2025
Slutsk	1–2	Isloch Minsk Raion
Minsk	2–3	Dynamo Brest
27 July 2025
Arsenal Dzerzhinsk	1–0	Molodechno-2018
Slavia Mozyr	1–0 (a.e.t.)	Gomel
18 November 2025
Smorgon	0–4	Torpedo-BelAZ Zhodino
3 December 2025
Dinamo Minsk	1–1 (4–2 p)	Vitebsk
4 December 2025
Maxline Vitebsk	8–1	Slonim-2017

== Quarter-finals ==
The eight Round of 16 winners entered the quarter-finals, held over two legs. The first legs were held on 7 and 8 March 2026, followed by the second legs on 14 and 15 March 2026.

Team 1	Agg.	Team 2	1st leg	2nd leg
Torpedo-BelAZ Zhodino	1–2	BATE Borisov	1–0	0–2
Isloch Minsk Raion	1–1 (4–5 p)	Dinamo Minsk	1–0	0–1 (a.e.t.)
Dynamo Brest	0–4	Maxline Vitebsk	0–2	0–2
Slavia Mozyr	4–0	Arsenal Dzerzhinsk	2–0	2–0

== Semi-finals ==
The four quarter-final winners entered the semi-finals, held over two legs. The first legs will be held on 15 April 2026, followed by the second legs on 29 April 2026.

Team 1	Agg.	Team 2	1st leg	2nd leg
Maxline Vitebsk	0–3	Dinamo Minsk	0–2	0–1
Slavia Mozyr	0–3	BATE Borisov	0–1	0–2

== Final ==
The final was held between the two semi-final winners.

16 May 2026
15:30 UTC+3

Dinamo Minsk	1–1 (a.e.t.)	BATE Borisov
Sokolovskiy 28'	Report	Apanasevich 63'
Penalties
Malashevich (penalty scored); Djimet (penalty scored); Gweth (penalty missed); Begunov (penalty scored); Toure (penalty scored); Kalinin (penalty scored); Zhechko (penalty scored); Karpovich (penalty scored); Selyava (penalty missed)	7–8	(penalty scored) Dubovskiy; (penalty scored) Apanasevich; (penalty missed) Neskoromnyi; (penalty scored) Grivenev; (penalty scored) Rusakov; (penalty scored) Kress; (penalty scored) Rashchenya; (penalty scored) Sakuta; (penalty scored) Yarmolich

National Football Stadium, Minsk
Attendance: 21,137
Referee: Sergey Stetsurin
