= Lisakovich =

Lisakovich is a surname. Notable people with the surname include:

- Dmitry Lisakovich (born 1999), Belarusian footballer
- Ruslan Lisakovich (born 2002), Belarusian footballer
- Vitaly Lisakovich (born 1998), Belarusian footballer
