= Aleksandr Orekhov =

Aleksandr Orekhov may refer to:

- Aleksandr Orekhov (footballer, born 1983), Russian football player
- Aleksandr Orekhov (footballer, born 2002), Russian football player
