= Anton Lukashov =

Belarusian footballer

- Lukashov in 2022

Personal information
- Full name: Anton Yuryevich Lukashov
- Date of birth: 16 September 2004 (age 22)
- Place of birth: Mogilev, Belarus
- Height: 1.83 m (6 ft 0 in)
- Position: Right-back

Team information
- Current team: Orenburg
- Number: 22

Youth career
- Dnepr Mogilev

Senior career*
Years	Team	Apps	(Gls)
2022–2024	Dnepr Mogilev	66	(3)
2025–2026	Slavia Mozyr	47	(2)
2026–	Orenburg	5	(0)

International career^{‡}
2022	Belarus U19	1	(0)
2025–2026	Belarus U21	7	(0)
2026–	Belarus	4	(0)
- * Club domestic league appearances and goals as of 1 November 2026 ‡ National team caps and goals as of 15 November 2026

Anton Yuryevich Lukashov (Russian: Антон Юрьевич Лукашов; Belarusian: Anton Yur'yevich Lukashow, Антон Юр’евіч Лукашоў; born 16 September 2004) is a Belarusian football player who plays as a right-back for Russian club Orenburg and the Belarus national team.

== Club career ==
On 10 September 2026, Lukashov signed a contract with Russian Premier League club Orenburg. He made his RPL debut for Orenburg on 17 September 2026 in a game against Krasnodar.

== International career ==
On 29 September 2026, Lukashov made his Belarus national team debut in a 2026–27 UEFA Nations League C game against Finland.

== Career statistics ==
As of 1 November 2026

Club	Season	League			Cup		Total	
Club	Season	Division	Apps	Goals	Apps	Goals	Apps	Goals
Dnepr Mogilev	2022	Belarusian Premier League	18	0	2	0	20	0
Dnepr Mogilev	2023	Belarusian First League	28	2	3	0	31	2
Dnepr Mogilev	2024	Belarusian Premier League	20	1	1	0	21	1
Dnepr Mogilev	Total		66	3	6	0	72	3
Slavia Mozyr	2025	Belarusian Premier League	28	1	2	0	30	1
Slavia Mozyr	2026	Belarusian Premier League	19	1	6	1	25	2
Slavia Mozyr	Total		47	2	8	1	55	3
Orenburg	2026–27	Russian Premier League	5	0	1	0	6	0
Career total			118	5	15	1	133	6
