= Oleg Nikiforenko =

Belarusian footballer

Personal information
- Date of birth: 17 March 2001 (age 25)
- Place of birth: Mogilev, Belarus
- Height: 1.77 m (5 ft 10 in)
- Position: Midfielder

Team information
- Current team: Spartak Kostroma
- Number: 82

Youth career
- 2017–2018: Dnepr Mogilev
- 2018–2019: Dinamo Brest

Senior career*
| Years | Team | Apps | (Gls) |
| 2019–2020 | Dinamo Brest | 3 | (0) |
| 2020 | → Rukh Brest (loan) | 16 | (5) |
| 2021–2022 | Rukh Brest | 15 | (1) |
| 2022 | → Isloch Minsk Raion (loan) | 13 | (3) |
| 2022 | Isloch Minsk Raion | 14 | (2) |
| 2023 | Dinamo Minsk | 12 | (2) |
| 2024 | BATE Borisov | 15 | (3) |
| 2025 | Maxline Vitebsk | 21 | (5) |
| 2026 | Radnički Niš | 6 | (1) |
| 2026– | Spartak Kostroma | 0 | (0) |

International career^{‡}
| 2017 | Belarus U17 | 2 | (0) |
| 2019 | Belarus U19 | 3 | (0) |
| 2021–2022 | Belarus U21 | 12 | (3) |
| 2025– | Belarus | 1 | (0) |
- * Club domestic league appearances and goals as of 13 June 2026 ‡ National team caps and goals as of 10 June 2025

Oleg Nikiforenko (Belarusian: Алег Нікіфарэнка; Russian: Олег Никифоренко; born 17 March 2001) is a Belarusian professional footballer who plays for Russian club Spartak Kostroma and the Belarus national team.

== Honors ==
Dinamo Brest

- Belarusian Premier League: 2019
- Belarusian Super Cup: 2019

Dinamo Minsk

- Belarusian Premier League: 2023

Maxline Vitebsk

- Belarusian Premier League: 2025
