= Aleksandr Mikhalenko =

Belarusian footballer

Personal information
- Date of birth: 12 December 2001 (age 24)
- Place of birth: Minsk, Belarus
- Height: 1.76 m (5 ft 9 in)
- Position: Defender

Team information
- Current team: Dnepr Mogilev
- Number: 18

Youth career
- 2017–2021: Dinamo Minsk

Senior career*
| Years | Team | Apps | (Gls) |
| 2021–2024 | Dinamo Minsk | 0 | (0) |
| 2021 | → Sputnik Rechitsa (loan) | 13 | (0) |
| 2021 | → Dnepr Mogilev (loan) | 10 | (1) |
| 2022 | → Isloch Minsk Raion (loan) | 6 | (0) |
| 2023 | → Energetik-BGU Minsk (loan) | 25 | (1) |
| 2024 | Minsk | 25 | (1) |
| 2025 | Arsenal Dzerzhinsk | 25 | (0) |
| 2026 | Asiagoal Bishkek | 14 | (0) |
| 2026– | Dnepr Mogilev | 6 | (0) |

International career^{‡}
| 2021–2022 | Belarus U21 | 3 | (0) |
- * Club domestic league appearances and goals as of 6 September 2026 ‡ National team caps and goals as of 29 March 2022

Aleksandr Mikhalenko (Belarusian: Аляксандр Міхаленка; Russian: Александр Михаленко; born 12 December 2001) is a Belarusian professional footballer who plays for Dnepr Mogilev.
