= Andrey Misyuk =

Belarusian footballer

Personal information
- Date of birth: 20 March 1981 (age 45)
- Place of birth: Grodno, Byelorussian SSR, Soviet Union
- Height: 1.78 m (5 ft 10 in)
- Position: Midfielder

Youth career
- 1997–2000: Neman Grodno

Senior career*
Years	Team	Apps	(Gls)
1997–1999	Neman-2 Grodno	52	(0)
2001–2004	Kommunalnik Slonim	100	(22)
2005–2007	Darida Minsk Raion	71	(8)
2008–2009	Gomel	54	(4)
2010	Belshina Bobruisk	20	(0)
2011	Partizan Minsk	27	(2)
2012–2013	Gorodeya	40	(3)
2014–2016	Isloch Minsk Raion	76	(17)
- * Club domestic league appearances and goals as of 1 December 2016

Andrey Misyuk (Belarusian: Андрэй Місюк; Russian: Андрей Мисюк; born 20 March 1981) is a retired Belarusian professional footballer.
