= Fard Ibrahim =

Ghanaian footballer

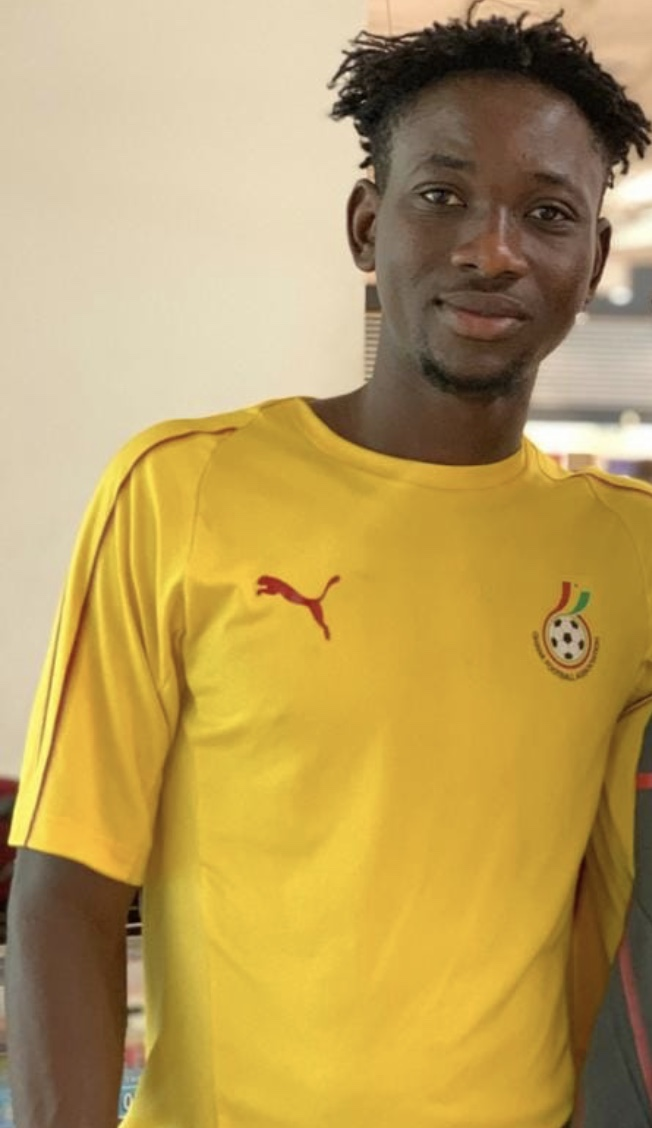
- Ibrahim in 2019

Personal information
- Full name: Fard Ibrahim
- Date of birth: 7 January 2000 (age 26)
- Place of birth: Accra, Ghana
- Height: 1.84 m (6 ft 0 in)
- Position: Leftback

Team information
- Current team: Irtysh Pavlodar
- Number: 33

Senior career*
Years	Team	Apps	(Gls)
2015–2021	Inter Allies	41	(0)
2018–2019	→ Vejle (loan)	0	(0)
2022–2024	Isloch Minsk Raion	54	(2)
2025	Dinamo Minsk	21	(1)
2026–	Irtysh Pavlodar	13	(0)

International career
2019	Ghana U20		
- * Club domestic league appearances and goals as of 30 June 2026

Fard Ibrahim (born 7 January 2000) is a professional Ghanaian football player who plays for Irtysh Pavlodar. He plays in the left-back defender position. His preferred foot is the left.

== Professional career ==
Fard Ibrahim started his professional career in the Ghanaian Premier League team Inter Allies. He played 29 matches for Inter Allies in the Ghana Premier League before he was sent out on loan.

In September 2018, he loaned to the Danish Superliga club Vejle Boldklub. He played 10 matches in the Youth League, five in the Reserve League and in three for the first team.

In January 2019, he joined the Ghana U20 for 2019 Africa U-20 Cup of Nations.
