= Artyom Denisenko =

Belarusian footballer

Personal information
- Full name: Artyom Vyacheslavovich Denisenko
- Date of birth: 12 April 1999 (age 27)
- Place of birth: Brest, Belarus
- Height: 1.88 m (6 ft 2 in)
- Position: Goalkeeper

Youth career
- 2016–2018: Dinamo Brest

Senior career*
Years	Team	Apps	(Gls)
2016–2021	Dinamo Brest	0	(0)
2019–2020	→ Rukh Brest (loan)	2	(0)
2022–2023	Belshina Bobruisk	27	(0)
2023–2024	Isloch Minsk Raion	0	(0)
2024	Zorza Mostki	9	(0)
2025	Naftan Novopolotsk	8	(0)
2026	Smorgon	4	(0)
- * Club domestic league appearances and goals as of 6 July 2026

Artyom Vyacheslavovich Denisenko (Belarusian: Арцём Вячаслававіч Дзенісенка; Russian: Артём Вячеславович Денисенко; born 12 April 1999) is a Belarusian professional footballer who plays as a goalkeeper.

== Honours ==
Dinamo Brest

- Belarusian Super Cup: 2019
