= Yevgeny Krasnov =

Belarusian footballer

Personal information
- Full name: Yevgeny Vladimirovich Krasnov
- Date of birth: 9 February 1998 (age 28)
- Place of birth: Mogilev, Belarus
- Height: 1.75 m (5 ft 9 in)
- Position: Forward

Team information
- Current team: Vitebsk
- Number: 20

Youth career
- 2016–2018: Dnepr Mogilev

Senior career*
Years	Team	Apps	(Gls)
2018	Dnepr Mogilev	8	(0)
2019–2020	Isloch Minsk Raion	10	(0)
2020–	Vitebsk	159	(21)
- * Club domestic league appearances and goals as of 3 July 2026

Yevgeny Vladimirovich Krasnov (Belarusian: Яўген Уладзіміравіч Красноў; Russian: Евгений Владимирович Краснов; born 9 February 1998) is a Belarusian footballer, who plays for Vitebsk.
