= Aleksey Shalashnikov =

Belarusian footballer

Aleksey Shalashnikov Alyaksey Shalashnikaw
Personal information
- Full name: Аляксей Шалашнікаў
- Date of birth: 22 March 2002 (age 24)
- Place of birth: Grodno, Belarus
- Height: 1.86 m (6 ft 1 in)
- Position: Defender

Team information
- Current team: Neman Grodno
- Number: 50

Youth career
- 2017–2018: Belcard Grodno
- 2018–2019: ABFF Academy
- 2019–2021: BATE Borisov

Senior career*
Years	Team	Apps	(Gls)
2021–2023	BATE Borisov	0	(0)
2021	→ Isloch Minsk Raion (loan)	15	(0)
2022	→ Neman Grodno (loan)	10	(0)
2023	→ Slavia Mozyr (loan)	1	(0)
2024–	Neman Grodno	2	(0)
2024	→ Smorgon (loan)	26	(1)

International career
2018–2019	Belarus U17	5	(1)
- * Club domestic league appearances and goals as of 1 December 2025

Aleksey Shalashnikov or Alyaksey Shalashnikaw (Belarusian: Аляксей Шалашнікаў; Russian: Алексей Шалашников; born 22 March 2002) is a Belarusian professional footballer who plays for Neman Grodno.
