= Alyaksandr Tsishkevich =

Belarusian footballer

Personal information
- Date of birth: 16 February 1986 (age 40)
- Place of birth: Minsk, Soviet Union
- Height: 1.76 m (5 ft 9 1/2 in)
- Position: Defender

Youth career
- 2002–2003: RUOR Minsk

Senior career*
Years	Team	Apps	(Gls)
2002–2003	RUOR Minsk	33	(3)
2004–2006	Dinamo Minsk	25	(0)
2006	→ Fulnek (loan)	5	(0)
2007	Vitebsk	7	(0)
2008	Naftan Novopolotsk	14	(0)
2009–2010	Belshina Bobruisk	34	(7)
2010	DSK Gomel	13	(1)
2011	Ararat Yerevan	2	(0)
2011	Slavia Mozyr	20	(0)
2012	Olimpia Elbląg	7	(0)
2012	Granit Mikashevichi	9	(1)
2013	Zalaegerszeg	8	(0)
2013	Kruoja Pakruojis	12	(2)
2014–2016	Isloch Minsk Raion	64	(15)

International career
2005–2008	Belarus U21	10	(0)
- * Club domestic league appearances and goals

Alyaksandr Tsishkevich (Belarusian: Аляксандр Цішкевіч; Russian: Александр Тишкевич; born 16 February 1986) is a Belarusian former professional footballer who played as a defender.

== Career ==
In August 2016, Tsishkevich was one of several Isloch Minsk Raion players alleged to be involved in match fixing during their match with Dinamo Brest on 30 April 2016. On 20 February 2018, the BFF banned him from football for life for his involvement in the match-fixing.
