= Aleksandr Guz =

Belarusian footballer

Personal information
- Full name: Aleksandr Vasilievich Guz
- Date of birth: 22 May 2004 (age 22)
- Place of birth: Rechitsa, Gomel Oblast, Belarus
- Height: 1.86 m (6 ft 1 in)
- Position: Midfielder

Team information
- Current team: SKA-1938 Minsk
- Number: 22

Youth career
- –2017: DYuSSh No.2 Rechitsa
- 2017–2021: ABFF Academy Minsk

Senior career*
Years	Team	Apps	(Gls)
2021–2023	Isloch Minsk Raion	37	(2)
2024–2026	Torpedo Moscow	3	(0)
2024	→ Sokol Saratov (loan)	14	(0)
2025	→ Isloch Minsk Raion (loan)	22	(0)
2026	→ SKA-1938 Minsk (loan)	3	(0)
2026–	SKA-1938 Minsk	1	(0)

International career^{‡}
2020	Belarus U-16	3	(0)
2021	Belarus U-18	2	(0)
2022–2023	Belarus U-19	7	(1)
2023–	Belarus U-21	9	(0)
- * Club domestic league appearances and goals as of 13 June 2026 ‡ National team caps and goals as of 25 March 2025

Aleksandr Guz (Belarusian: Аляксандр Гуз; Russian: Александр Гуз; born 22 May 2004) is a Belarusian professional footballer who plays for SKA-1938 Minsk.

== Club career ==
He made his Belarusian Premier League debut for Isloch Minsk Raion on 13 August 2021 in a game against Rukh Brest.

He made his debut in the Russian First League for Torpedo Moscow on 4 May 2024 in a game against Chernomorets Novorossiysk.
