= Nikita Patsko =

Belarusian footballer

Personal information
- Date of birth: 23 February 1995 (age 31)
- Place of birth: Vitebsk, Belarus
- Height: 1.75 m (5 ft 9 in)
- Position: Midfielder

Team information
- Current team: Isloch Minsk Raion
- Number: 15

Youth career
- 2009–2010: Vitebsk
- 2011–2014: Dinamo Minsk

Senior career*
Years	Team	Apps	(Gls)
2014–2015	Dinamo Minsk	0	(0)
2015	→ Bereza-2010 (loan)	17	(6)
2016–2018	Torpedo Minsk	54	(15)
2019	Arsenal Dzerzhinsk	26	(16)
2020	AFC Eskilstuna	0	(0)
2020–2022	Arsenal Dzerzhinsk	61	(9)
2022–2024	Torpedo-BelAZ Zhodino	44	(1)
2024	→ Torpedo-BelAZ-2 Zhodino	5	(3)
2025–	Isloch Minsk Raion	27	(3)

International career
2013	Belarus U19	2	(0)
2012	Belarus U21	2	(0)
- * Club domestic league appearances and goals as of 3 July 2026

Nikita Patsko (Belarusian: Мікіта Пацко; Russian: Никита Пацко; born 23 February 1995) is a Belarusian professional footballer who plays for Isloch Minsk Raion.

== Career ==
In January 2020 he signed with Swedish side AFC Eskilstuna along with Yuriy Lovets. However, after the start of 2020 Superettan season was delayed due to COVID-19 pandemic, both players returned to Belarus and re-signed with Arsenal Dzerzhinsk.
