= Yamoussa Camara (footballer) =

Guinean footballer

Personal information
- Date of birth: 26 April 2000 (age 26)
- Place of birth: Conakry, Guinea
- Height: 1.70 m (5 ft 7 in)
- Position: Midfielder

Youth career
- Académie Sainte-Marie de Dixinn

Senior career*
Years	Team	Apps	(Gls)
2021–2022	Rukh Brest	0	(0)
2021	→ Smorgon (loan)	29	(0)
2022	→ BATE Borisov (loan)	2	(0)
2022	Isloch Minsk Raion	9	(0)
2023	Energetik-BGU Minsk	1	(0)
2023–2024	Smorgon	50	(1)
2025	Naftan Novopolotsk	27	(1)
- * Club domestic league appearances and goals as of 3 April 2026

Yamoussa Camara (born 26 April 2000) is a Guinean professional footballer.
