= Vladislav Lyakh =

Belarusian footballer

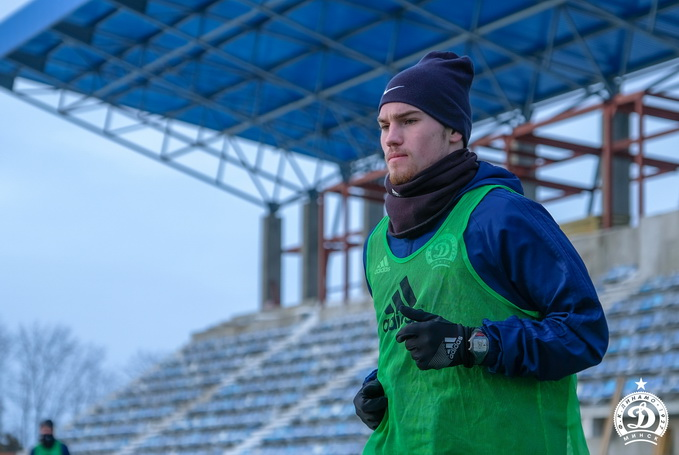

Personal information
- Date of birth: 13 August 1999 (age 27)
- Place of birth: Minsk, Belarus
- Height: 1.83 m (6 ft 0 in)
- Position: Defender

Team information
- Current team: Dynamo Brest
- Number: 23

Youth career
- 2014–2018: Dinamo Minsk

Senior career*
Years	Team	Apps	(Gls)
2018–2022	Dinamo Minsk	4	(0)
2020	→ Lokomotiv Gomel (loan)	18	(0)
2022	→ Arsenal Dzerzhinsk (loan)	8	(0)
2023	Arsenal Dzerzhinsk	23	(1)
2024	Dynamo Brest	26	(2)
2025	BATE Borisov	13	(0)
2025–2026	Spartak Kostroma	10	(0)
2026–	Dynamo Brest	4	(0)

International career^{‡}
2019–2020	Belarus U21	4	(0)
- * Club domestic league appearances and goals as of 7 September 2026 ‡ National team caps and goals as of 8 September 2020

Vladislav Lyakh (Belarusian: Уладзіслаў Лях; Russian: Владислав Лях; born 13 August 1999) is a Belarusian professional footballer who plays for Dynamo Brest.
