= Mikalay Ivanow =

Belarusian footballer

Personal information
- Date of birth: 2 January 2000 (age 26)
- Place of birth: Minsk, Belarus
- Height: 1.89 m (6 ft 2 in)
- Position: Midfielder

Team information
- Current team: Lokomotiv Tashkent
- Number: 14

Youth career
- 2014–2019: Dinamo Minsk

Senior career*
Years	Team	Apps	(Gls)
2017–2022	Dinamo Minsk	2	(0)
2020	→ Gomel (loan)	23	(3)
2021	→ Isloch Minsk Raion (loan)	2	(0)
2021	→ Naftan Novopolotsk (loan)	18	(2)
2022	→ Minsk (loan)	15	(0)
2023	Maxline Vitebsk	29	(8)
2024	Mashuk-KMV Pyatigorsk	18	(1)
2024	Maxline Vitebsk	17	(1)
2025	Slavia Mozyr	29	(4)
2026–	Lokomotiv Tashkent	14	(1)

International career
2018	Belarus U19	3	(0)
- * Club domestic league appearances and goals as of 29 July 2026

Mikalay Ivanow (Belarusian: Мікалай Іваноў; Russian: Николай Иванов; born 25 January 2000) is a Belarusian professional footballer who plays for Lokomotiv Tashkent.
