= Andrey Klimovich =

Belarusian footballer

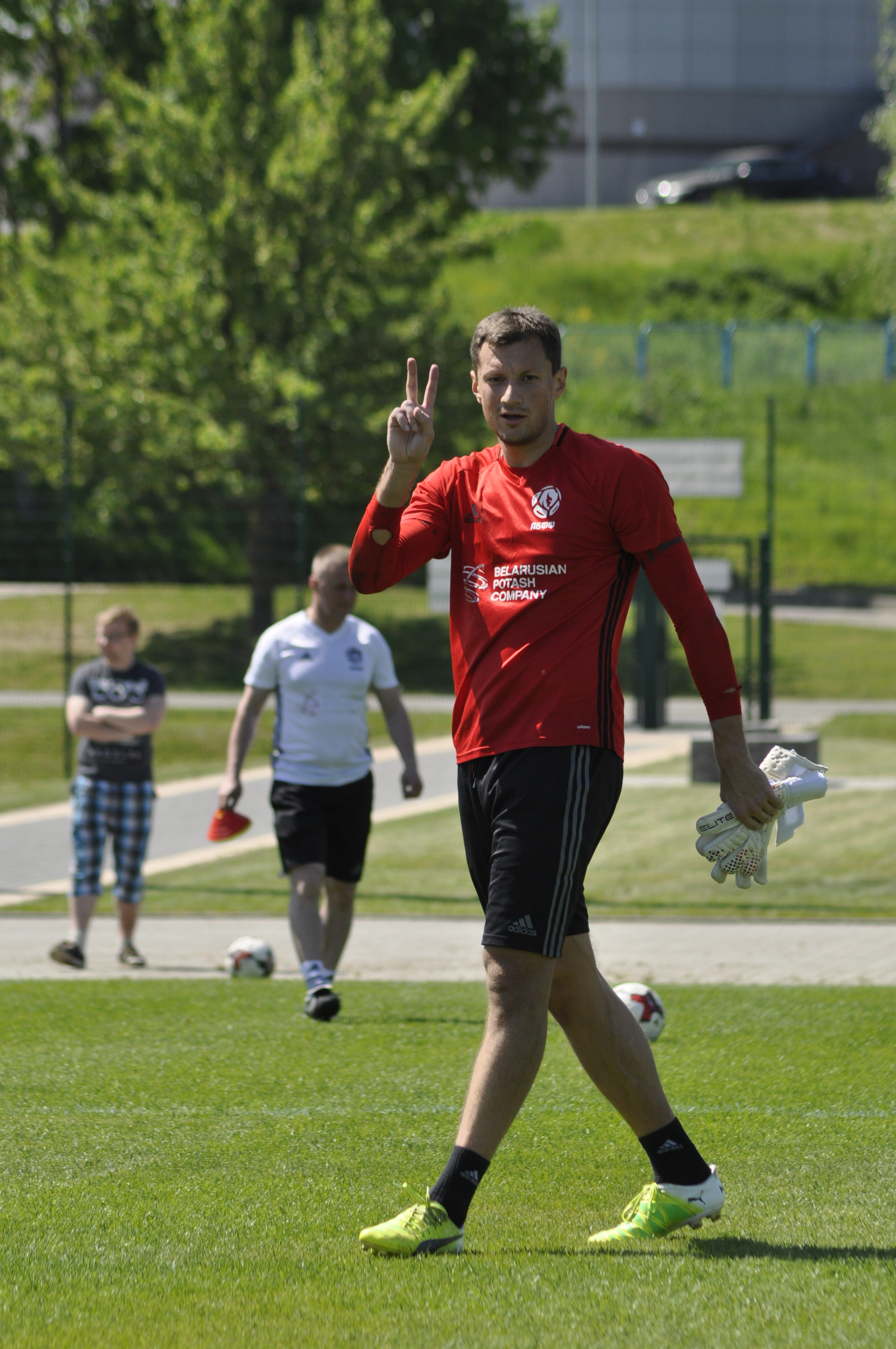

Personal information
- Date of birth: 27 August 1988 (age 38)
- Place of birth: Minsk, Belarusian SSR
- Height: 1.90 m (6 ft 3 in)
- Position: Goalkeeper

Team information
- Current team: Isloch Minsk Raion
- Number: 1

Youth career
- 2004–2005: Zvezda-BGU Minsk

Senior career*
Years	Team	Apps	(Gls)
2006	Zvezda-BGU Minsk	20	(0)
2007–2008	Dinamo Minsk	0	(0)
2009	Baranovichi	12	(0)
2010	Veras Nesvizh	25	(0)
2011–2013	Dinamo Brest	51	(0)
2014	Gomel	27	(0)
2015–2016	Minsk	56	(0)
2017	Dinamo Minsk	17	(0)
2018–2019	Shakhtyor Soligorsk	46	(0)
2019–2021	Orenburg	55	(0)
2021–2022	Kuban Krasnodar	17	(0)
2022–2024	Volga Ulyanovsk	49	(0)
2024–	Isloch Minsk Raion	32	(0)

International career^{‡}
2017–2019	Belarus	2	(0)
- * Club domestic league appearances and goals as of 3 July 2026 ‡ National team caps and goals as of 24 March 2019

Andrey Klimovich (Belarusian: Андрэй Клiмовiч; Russian: Андрей Климович; born 27 August 1988) is a Belarusian professional footballer who plays for Isloch Minsk Raion.

== Club career ==
On 30 August 2019, he signed with the Russian Premier League club FC Orenburg.

== International career ==
Klimovich was called up to the senior Belarus squad for a friendly against Republic of Ireland in May 2016. He earned his first cap on 12 June 2017, in the 1–0 win over New Zealand in another friendly match, playing the full 90 minutes.

== Honours ==
Shakhtyor Soligorsk

- Belarusian Cup: 2018–19
