= Albert Kopytich =

Belarusian footballer

Personal information
- Date of birth: 12 June 2002 (age 24)
- Place of birth: Grodno, Belarus
- Height: 1.79 m (5 ft 10 in)
- Position: Forward

Youth career
- 2014–2018: RGUOR Minsk
- 2018–2021: Neman Grodno

Senior career*
Years	Team	Apps	(Gls)
2021–2023	Neman Grodno	2	(0)
2022–2023	→ Smorgon (loan)	28	(5)
2024	Smorgon	22	(2)
2025	Naftan Novopolotsk	14	(2)
- * Club domestic league appearances and goals as of 3 April 2026

Albert Kopytich (Belarusian: Альберт Капыціч; Russian: Альберт Копытич; born 12 June 2002) is a Belarusian professional footballer.
