= Andrey Makarenko =

Belarusian footballer

Personal information
- Date of birth: 16 March 2002 (age 24)
- Place of birth: Vetka, Gomel Oblast, Belarus
- Height: 1.88 m (6 ft 2 in)
- Position: Defender

Team information
- Current team: Isloch Minsk Raion
- Number: 25

Youth career
- 2018–2020: Shakhtyor Soligorsk

Senior career*
Years	Team	Apps	(Gls)
2019–2024	Shakhtyor Soligorsk	38	(0)
2022	→ Shakhtyor Petrikov (loan)	15	(0)
2025–	Isloch Minsk Raion	36	(3)

International career^{‡}
2018–2019	Belarus U17	6	(0)
2023	Belarus U21	2	(0)
- * Club domestic league appearances and goals as of 3 July 2026 ‡ National team caps and goals as of 20 November 2023

Andrey Makarenko (Belarusian: Андрэй Макаранка; Russian: Андрей Макаренко; born 16 March 2002) is a Belarusian professional footballer who plays for Isloch Minsk Raion.

== Honors ==
Shakhtyor Soligorsk

- Belarusian Premier League: 2021
- Belarusian Super Cup: 2023
