= Maksim Avgustinovich =

Belarusian footballer

Personal information
- Date of birth: 20 August 2003 (age 23)
- Place of birth: Smarhonʹ, Grodno Oblast, Belarus
- Height: 1.89 m (6 ft 2 in)
- Position: Defender

Youth career
- 2016–2020: Smorgon

Senior career*
Years	Team	Apps	(Gls)
2020–2024	Smorgon	4	(0)
2024	→ Ostrovets (loan)	17	(0)
- * Club domestic league appearances and goals as of 7 April 2026

Maksim Avgustinovich (Belarusian: Максім Аўгусціновіч; Russian: Максим Августинович; born 20 August 2003) is a Belarusian former professional footballer who last played for Smorgon.
