= Albert Mikhaylov =

Belarusian footballer

Personal information
- Date of birth: 15 October 2002 (age 24)
- Place of birth: Vitebsk, Belarus
- Position: Midfielder

Senior career*
| Years | Team | Apps | (Gls) |
| 2020 | Smorgon | 2 | (0) |
| 2021–2022 | Energetik-BGU Minsk | 2 | (0) |
| 2022 | → Lida (loan) | 16 | (5) |
| 2023 | Arsenal Dzerzhinsk | 29 | (10) |
| 2024 | Smorgon | 0 | (0) |
| 2025 | Urozhaynaya | | |
- * Club domestic league appearances and goals as of 7 April 2026

Albert Mikhaylov (Belarusian: Альберт Міхайлаў; Russian: Альберт Михайлов; born 15 October 2002) is a Belarusian professional footballer.
