= Moustapha Djimet =

Central African Republic footballer

Personal information
- Date of birth: 12 June 2003 (age 23)
- Place of birth: Central African Republic
- Height: 1.87 m (6 ft 2 in)
- Position: Forward

Team information
- Current team: Dinamo Minsk
- Number: 30

Senior career*
Years	Team	Apps	(Gls)
2020–2024	Red Star Bangui		
2024	Minsk	12	(6)
2025–	Dinamo Minsk	38	(7)

International career^{‡}
2021–2023	Central African Republic U20	7	(0)
2022–	Central African Republic	8	(0)
- * Club domestic league appearances and goals as of 4 July 2026 ‡ National team caps and goals as of 5 January 2026

Moustapha Djimet (born 12 June 2003) is a Central African Republican professional footballer who plays for Belarusian Premier League club Dinamo Minsk and the Central African Republic national team.

== Club career ==
Djimet played his domestic career with Red Star Bangui. The club won the 2023–24 Central African Republic League and qualified as the Central African Republic's entrant into the 2024–25 CAF Champions League with Djimet a prominent member of the squad. In August 2024, the club announced it was finalizing a transfer of the player. Djimet then joined FC Minsk of the Belarusian Premier League for the second half of the 2024 season. His strong early performances for the club included a hat-trick against FC Isloch Minsk Raion on matchday 21.

== International career ==
Djimet represented the Central African Republic at the youth level at the 2021 and 2023 U-20 Africa Cup of Nations. He made his senior international debut on 28 August 2022 in a 2022 African Nations Championship qualification match against the Congo.

=== International career statistics ===
As of match played 28 August 2022

National team	Year	Apps	Goals
Central African Republic
Central African Republic	2022	1	0
Total		1	0
