= Igor Zayats =

Belarusian professional footballer

Personal information
- Date of birth: 8 January 1999 (age 27)
- Place of birth: Minsk, Belarus
- Height: 1.80 m (5 ft 11 in)
- Position: Defender

Team information
- Current team: Gomel
- Number: 16

Youth career
- 2014–2019: Dinamo Minsk

Senior career*
Years	Team	Apps	(Gls)
2019–2022	Dinamo Minsk	0	(0)
2019	→ Smolevichi (loan)	25	(0)
2020–2021	→ Gomel (loan)	42	(0)
2022	→ Slutsk (loan)	13	(0)
2023	Slutsk	20	(1)
2024–	Gomel	65	(0)
- * Club domestic league appearances and goals as of 6 July 2026

Igor Zayats (Belarusian: Ігар Заяц; Russian: Игорь Заяц; born 8 January 1999) is a Belarusian professional footballer who plays for Gomel.

== Honours ==
Gomel

- Belarusian Cup winner: 2021–22
