= Andrey Rylach =

Belarusian footballer

Personal information
- Date of birth: 5 June 2002 (age 24)
- Place of birth: Minsk, Belarus
- Height: 1.76 m (5 ft 9 in)
- Position: Midfielder

Team information
- Current team: Dinamo Brest
- Number: 2

Youth career
- 2009–2010: Minsk
- 2010–2015: Dinamo Minsk
- 2015–2016: FShM Minsk
- 2017: BATE Borisov
- 2018–2019: Shakhtyor Soligorsk

Senior career*
Years	Team	Apps	(Gls)
2019–2020	Arsenal Dzerzhinsk	14	(1)
2020–2022	Energetik-BGU Minsk	59	(1)
2023–2024	Dinamo Minsk	22	(0)
2024	→ Gomel (loan)	26	(1)
2025–	Dinamo Brest	31	(0)

International career^{‡}
2018	Belarus U17		
2021–2023	Belarus U21	20	(1)
- * Club domestic league appearances and goals as of 6 July 2026 ‡ National team caps and goals as of 20 November 2023

Andrey Rylach (Belarusian: Андрэй Рылач; Russian: Андрей Рылач; born 5 June 2002) is a Belarusian professional footballer who plays for Dinamo Brest.
