= Pavel Okhremchuk =

Belarusian footballer

Personal information
- Date of birth: 18 June 1993 (age 33)
- Place of birth: Minsk, Belarus
- Height: 1.90 m (6 ft 3 in)
- Position: Goalkeeper

Youth career
- 2010–2012: Minsk

Senior career*
Years	Team	Apps	(Gls)
2013–2014	Minsk-2	39	(0)
2014–2016	Smolevichi-STI	30	(0)
2017	Granit Mikashevichi	19	(0)
2018	Smolevichi	0	(0)
2019–2020	Granit Mikashevichi	22	(0)
2020–2021	Belshina Bobruisk	12	(0)
2022–2024	Smorgon	53	(0)
2024	Bumprom Gomel	5	(0)
2025	Molodechno	2	(0)

International career
2011	Belarus U19	3	(0)
- * Club domestic league appearances and goals as of 7 April 2026

Pavel Okhremchuk (Belarusian: Павел Ахрамчук; Russian: Павел Охремчук; born 18 June 1993) is a Belarusian professional footballer.
