= Aleksandr Ksenofontov =

Belarusian footballer

Personal information
- Date of birth: 5 May 1999 (age 27)
- Place of birth: Minsk, Belarus
- Height: 1.80 m (5 ft 11 in)
- Position: Midfielder

Team information
- Current team: Minsk
- Number: 80

Youth career
- 2014–2018: Dinamo Minsk

Senior career*
Years	Team	Apps	(Gls)
2018–2020	Dinamo Minsk	4	(0)
2018	→ Chist (loan)	12	(4)
2020	→ Vitebsk (loan)	10	(1)
2021–2022	Vitebsk	43	(8)
2022–2024	Rodina Moscow	7	(0)
2022	Rodina-2 Moscow	1	(0)
2023	→ Torpedo-BelAZ Zhodino (loan)	25	(4)
2024	Torpedo-BelAZ Zhodino	22	(1)
2025	Vitebsk	26	(6)
2026–	Minsk	14	(3)

International career
2015	Belarus U17	3	(1)
2017	Belarus U19	1	(0)
2019–2020	Belarus U21	5	(0)
- * Club domestic league appearances and goals as of 6 July 2026

Aleksandr Ksenofontov (Belarusian: Аляксандр Ксенафонтаў; Russian: Александр Ксенофонтов; born 5 May 1999) is a Belarusian professional footballer who plays for Minsk.
