= Aleksandr Orekhov (footballer, born 2002) =

Russian footballer

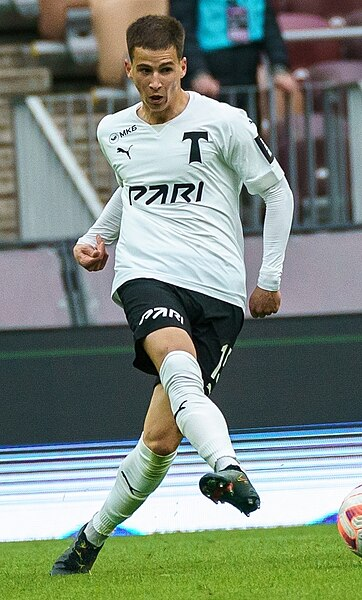
- Orekhov with Torpedo Moscow in 2023

Personal information
- Full name: Aleksandr Pavlovich Orekhov
- Date of birth: 24 May 2002 (age 24)
- Place of birth: Moscow, Russia
- Height: 1.76 m (5 ft 9 in)
- Position: Midfielder

Team information
- Current team: Torpedo Moscow
- Number: 27

Youth career
- 2013–2018: Torpedo Moscow

Senior career*
Years	Team	Apps	(Gls)
2019–	Torpedo Moscow	75	(1)
2022–2023	→ Torpedo-2	22	(2)
2025	→ Torpedo-BelAZ Zhodino (loan)	14	(1)
- * Club domestic league appearances and goals as of 16 May 2026

Aleksandr Pavlovich Orekhov (Russian: Александр Павлович Орехов; born 24 May 2002) is a Russian football player who plays for Torpedo Moscow.

== Club career ==
He made his debut in the Russian Professional Football League for Torpedo Moscow on 12 May 2019 in a game against Rotor-2 Volgograd.

He made his Russian Football National League debut for Torpedo Moscow on 14 September 2019 in a game against Krasnodar-2. He made his Russian Premier League debut for Torpedo on 6 May 2023 against Akhmat Grozny.

On 31 May 2023, Orekhov extended his contract with Torpedo until June 2026.

== Honours ==
Torpedo Moscow

- Russian Football National League : 2021-22

== Career statistics ==
As of 16 May 2026

Club	Season	League			Cup		Continental		Total	
Club	Season	Division	Apps	Goals	Apps	Goals	Apps	Goals	Apps	Goals
Torpedo Moscow	2018–19	Russian Second League	1	0	—		—		1	0
Torpedo Moscow	2019–20	Russian First League	9	0	0	0	—		9	0
Torpedo Moscow	2020–21	Russian First League	7	0	0	0	—		7	0
Torpedo Moscow	2021–22	Russian First League	8	0	2	0	—		10	0
Torpedo Moscow	2022–23	Russian Premier League	5	0	3	0	—		8	0
Torpedo Moscow	2023–24	Russian First League	19	0	1	0	—		20	0
Torpedo Moscow	2024–25	Russian First League	2	0	2	0	—		4	0
Torpedo Moscow	2025–26	Russian First League	24	1	2	0	—		26	1
Torpedo Moscow	Total		75	1	10	0	0	0	85	1
Torpedo-2	2022–23	Russian Second League	22	2	—		—		22	2
Torpedo-BelAZ Zhodino (loan)	2025	Belarusian Premier League	14	1	5	0	4 (Note: Appearances in UEFA Conference League)	0	23	1
Career total			111	4	15	0	4	0	130	4
