= Nikita Kostomarov =

Belarusian footballer

Personal information
- Date of birth: 29 June 1999 (age 27)
- Place of birth: Vitebsk, Belarus
- Position: Defender

Team information
- Current team: Neftchi Kochkor-Ata
- Number: 3

Youth career
- 2015–2018: Vitebsk

Senior career*
Years	Team	Apps	(Gls)
2018–2023	Vitebsk	39	(3)
2018	→ Naftan Novopolotsk (loan)	16	(1)
2019	→ Orsha (loan)	21	(0)
2021–2022	→ Naftan Novopolotsk (loan)	41	(2)
2024	Maxline Vitebsk	10	(0)
2025–2026	Naftan Novopolotsk	37	(1)
2026–	Neftchi Kochkor-Ata	4	(0)
- * Club domestic league appearances and goals as of 1 September 2026

Nikita Kostomarov (Belarusian: Мікіта Кастамараў; Russian: Никита Костомаров; born 29 June 1999) is a Belarusian professional footballer who plays for Neftchi Kochkor-Ata.
