= Mikhail Sachkovskiy =

Belarusian footballer

Personal information
- Date of birth: 21 November 2002 (age 23)
- Place of birth: Pinsk, Brest Oblast, Belarus
- Height: 1.83 m (6 ft 0 in)
- Position: Midfielder

Team information
- Current team: Isloch Minsk Raion
- Number: 74

Youth career
- 2016–2020: Slutsk

Senior career*
Years	Team	Apps	(Gls)
2020–2024	Slutsk	75	(0)
2025–2026	Slavia Mozyr	28	(1)
2026–	Isloch Minsk Raion	1	(0)

International career^{‡}
2022	Belarus U21	1	(0)
- * Club domestic league appearances and goals as of 16 August 2026 ‡ National team caps and goals as of 27 September 2022

Mikhail Sachkovskiy (Belarusian: Міхаіл Сачкоўскі; Russian: Михаил Сачковский; born 21 November 2002) is a Belarusian professional footballer who plays for Isloch Minsk Raion.
