= Vladimir Maslovsky =

Belarusian footballer (born 2000)

Personal information
- Full name: Vladimir Anatolyevich Maslovsky
- Date of birth: 20 December 2000 (age 25)
- Place of birth: Minsk, Belarus
- Position: Midfielder

Team information
- Current team: OshMU
- Number: 22

Youth career
- 2014–2019: RCOP-BGU Minsk

Senior career*
Years	Team	Apps	(Gls)
2019	Energetik-BGU Minsk	0	(0)
2019	→ Smorgon (loan)	12	(0)
2020–2021	Smorgon	31	(1)
2021	BGU Minsk	13	(7)
2022–2023	Molodechno	54	(8)
2024	Isloch Minsk Raion	2	(0)
2025	Smorgon	29	(1)
2026–	OshMU	2	(0)
- * Club domestic league appearances and goals as of 15 March 2026

Vladimir Anatolyevich Maslovsky (Belarusian: Уладзімір Анатольевіч Маслоўскі; Russian: Владимир Анатольевич Масловский; born 20 December 2000) is a Belarusian professional footballer who plays for Kyrgyz Premier League club OshMU.
