= Kirill Leonovich =

Belarusian footba (born 1998)

Personal information
- Date of birth: 21 April 1998 (age 28)
- Place of birth: Zhodino, Minsk Oblast, Belarus
- Height: 1.78 m (5 ft 10 in)
- Position: Midfielder

Team information
- Current team: Gomel
- Number: 9

Youth career
- 2014–2015: Torpedo-BelAZ Zhodino
- 2015–2016: Dinamo Minsk

Senior career*
Years	Team	Apps	(Gls)
2016–2018	Dinamo Minsk	0	(0)
2016	→ Oshmyany (loan)	13	(1)
2017	→ Smolevichi-STI (loan)	18	(1)
2018	→ Lida (loan)	16	(1)
2019	Lida	27	(6)
2020–2021	Torpedo-BelAZ Zhodino	8	(1)
2021	→ Smorgon (loan)	11	(4)
2022	Neman Grodno	2	(0)
2022	Isloch Minsk Raion	12	(2)
2023	Belshina Bobruisk	26	(1)
2024	Smorgon	28	(8)
2025	Vitebsk	12	(2)
2025	Naftan Novopolotsk	12	(5)
2026–	Gomel	14	(1)
- * Club domestic league appearances and goals as of 6 July 2026

Kirill Leonovich (Belarusian: Кірыл Леановіч; Russian: Кирилл Леонович; born 21 April 1998) is a Belarusian professional footballer who plays for Gomel.
