= Vladislav Solanovich =

Belarusian footballer

Personal information
- Date of birth: 25 May 1999 (age 27)
- Place of birth: Bobruisk, Mogilev Oblast, Belarus
- Height: 1.78 m (5 ft 10 in)
- Position: Defender

Team information
- Current team: Belshina Bobruisk
- Number: 4

Youth career
- 2015–2017: Belshina Bobruisk

Senior career*
Years	Team	Apps	(Gls)
2018–	Belshina Bobruisk	177	(16)
2018	→ Viktoriya Maryina Gorka (loan)	8	(2)

International career^{‡}
2020	Belarus U21	3	(0)
- * Club domestic league appearances and goals as of 3 July 2026 ‡ National team caps and goals as of 15 November 2020

Vladislav Solanovich (Belarusian: Уладзіслаў Салановіч; Russian: Владислав Соланович; born 25 May 1999) is a Belarusian professional footballer who plays for Belshina Bobruisk.
