= Terentiy Lutsevich =

Belarus international footballer (born 2013)

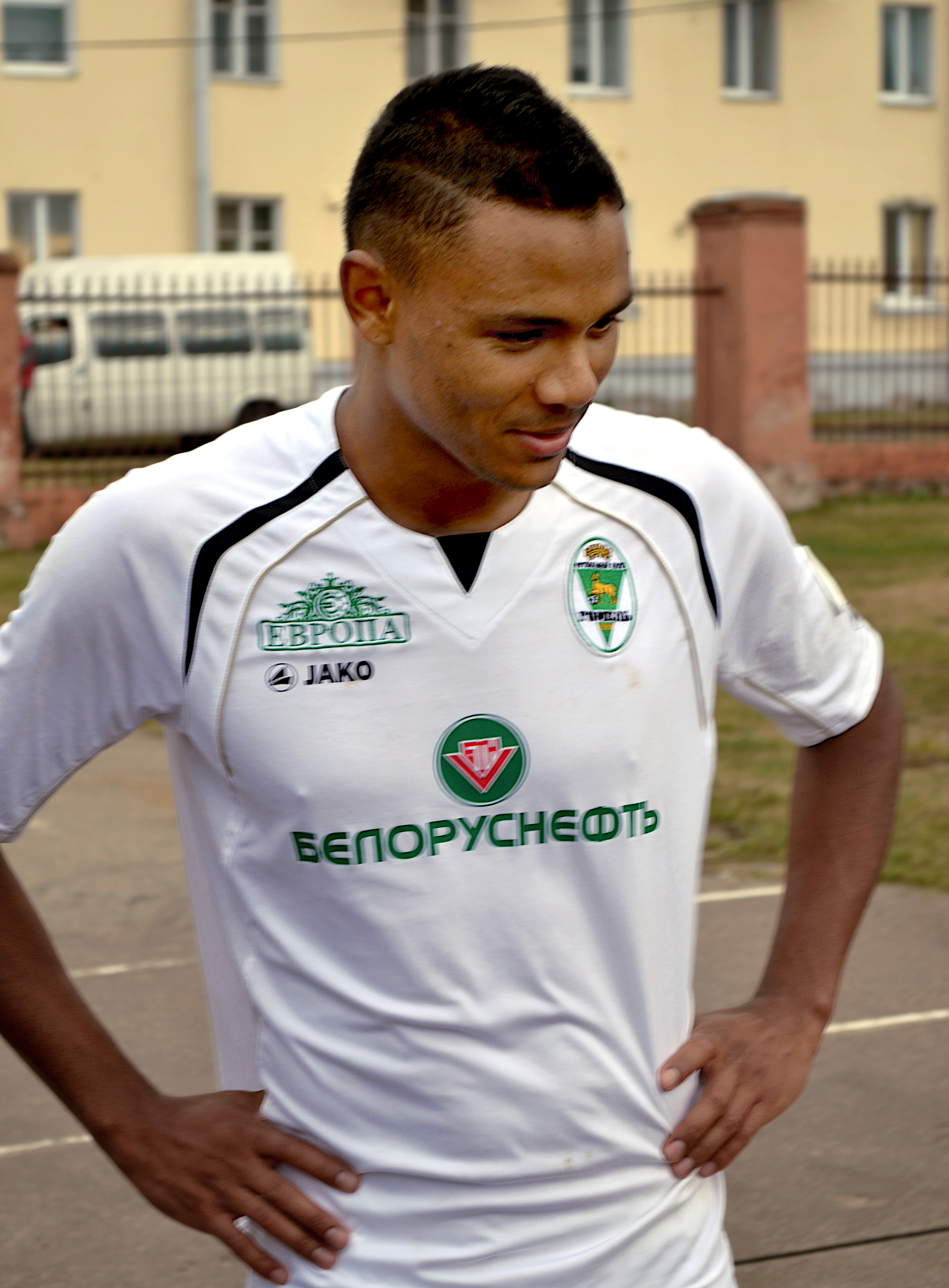
- Lutsevich in 2013

Personal information
- Date of birth: 19 April 1991 (age 35)
- Place of birth: Douala, Cameroon
- Height: 1.92 m (6 ft 4 in)
- Positions: Defender; forward

Team information
- Current team: Slavia Mozyr
- Number: 44

Youth career
- 2008–2009: Minsk

Senior career*
Years	Team	Apps	(Gls)
2008	Minsk-2	25	(8)
2010–2014	Dinamo Minsk	10	(0)
2012	→ Gomel (loan)	0	(0)
2012	→ Vitebsk (loan)	13	(3)
2013	→ Gomel (loan)	19	(1)
2014	→ Bereza-2010 (loan)	30	(10)
2015–2016	Granit Mikashevichi	39	(7)
2016	Torpedo-BelAZ Zhodino	14	(6)
2017	Neftchi Fergana	5	(0)
2017	Minsk	13	(0)
2018	Smolevichi	23	(1)
2019	Gomel	24	(3)
2020	Kyzylzhar	0	(0)
2020	Gomel	9	(0)
2021	Belshina Bobruisk	31	(5)
2022–2023	Naftan Novopolotsk	39	(2)
2024	Smorgon	25	(6)
2025–	Slavia Mozyr	43	(5)

International career
2009	Belarus U19	1	(0)
2011	Belarus U21	1	(1)
- * Club domestic league appearances and goals as of 6 July 2026

Terentiy Lutsevich (Russian: Терентий Луцевич; till January 2013 his name was Tyenchen Vobga; Belarusian: Цьенчэн Вабга; Russian: Тьенчен Вобга; born 19 April 1991) is a professional footballer who plays for Slavia Mozyr. Born in Cameroon, he has represented Belarus internationally at youth level.
