= Pavel Sedko =

Belarusian footballer

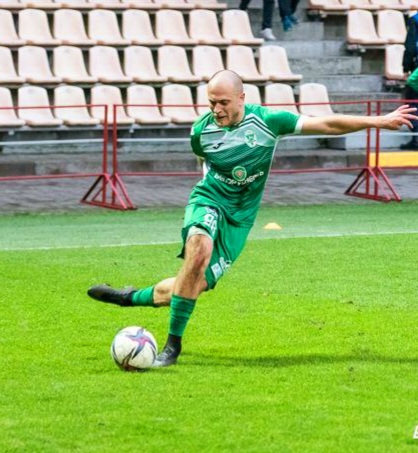
- Sedko with Gomel in 2022

Personal information
- Full name: Pavel Ivanovich Sedko
- Date of birth: 3 April 1998 (age 28)
- Place of birth: Brest, Belarus
- Height: 1.78 m (5 ft 10 in)
- Position: Midfielder

Team information
- Current team: Caspiy
- Number: 26

Youth career
- 2013–2015: Dynamo Brest

Senior career*
Years	Team	Apps	(Gls)
2015–2021	Dynamo Brest	90	(14)
2019–2020	→ Rukh Brest (loan)	32	(8)
2021–2022	Torpedo Moscow	9	(0)
2022	Gomel	17	(4)
2023–2024	Dinamo Minsk	45	(9)
2025	Torpedo-BelAZ Zhodino	26	(10)
2026	Irtysh Pavlodar	13	(2)
2026–	Caspiy	15	(4)

International career^{‡}
2016	Belarus U18	4	(0)
2016–2017	Belarus U19	6	(0)
2017–2020	Belarus U21	12	(1)
2017–	Belarus	14	(1)
- * Club domestic league appearances and goals as of 1 November 2026 ‡ National team caps and goals as of 10 June 2025

Pavel Ivanovich Sedko (Belarusian: Павел Іванавіч Сядзько; Russian: Павел Иванович Седько; born 3 April 1998) is a Belarusian professional footballer who plays for Caspiy and the Belarus national team.

== Club career ==
He made his debut in the Belarusian Premier League for Dynamo Brest on 14 September 2015 in a game against Belshina Bobruisk.

He made his debut in the Russian Football National League for Torpedo Moscow on 3 October 2021 in a game against Rotor Volgograd.

On 27 June 2022, Sedko's contract with Torpedo was terminated by mutual consent.

=== International goal ===
Scores and results list Belarus' goal tally first.

No	Date	Venue	Opponent	Score	Result	Competition
1.	5 September 2021	Central Stadium, Cardiff, Wales	Wales	2–1	2–3	2022 World Cup qualifier

== Honours ==
Dynamo Brest

- Belarusian Cup: 2016–17, 2017–18
- Belarusian Super Cup: 2018, 2019

Torpedo Moscow

- Russian Football National League : 2021-22
