= Ilya Kukharchik =

Belarusian footballer

Personal information
- Date of birth: 10 March 1997 (age 29)
- Place of birth: Baranavichy, Brest Oblast, Belarus
- Height: 1.72 m (5 ft 8 in)
- Position: Midfielder

Team information
- Current team: Slavia Mozyr
- Number: 8

Youth career
- 2012–2013: PMC Postavy
- 2014–2015: BATE Borisov

Senior career*
Years	Team	Apps	(Gls)
2015–2017	BATE Borisov	0	(0)
2017	→ Baranovichi (loan)	28	(5)
2018	Vitebsk	0	(0)
2018	→ Baranovichi (loan)	14	(1)
2018–2019	Belshina Bobruisk	26	(7)
2020–2021	Torpedo-BelAZ Zhodino	7	(0)
2021	→ Belshina Bobruisk (loan)	16	(4)
2022–2023	Belshina Bobruisk	56	(7)
2024	Neman Grodno	23	(1)
2025–	Slavia Mozyr	22	(6)

International career
2013	Belarus U17	3	(0)
2015	Belarus U19	3	(0)
- * Club domestic league appearances and goals as of 6 July 2026

Ilya Kukharchik (Belarusian: Ілья Кухарчык; Russian: Илья Кухарчик; born 10 March 1997) is a Belarusian professional footballer who plays for Slavia Mozyr.
