= Aleksandr Svirepa =

Belarusian footballer

Personal information
- Date of birth: 24 August 1999 (age 27)
- Place of birth: Maryina Gorka, Minsk Oblast, Belarus
- Height: 1.80 m (5 ft 11 in)
- Position: Defender

Team information
- Current team: Isloch Minsk Raion
- Number: 7

Youth career
- DYuSSh Pukhovichi
- 2016–2017: RCOP-BGU Minsk

Senior career*
| Years | Team | Apps | (Gls) |
| 2015 | Viktoriya Maryina Gorka | 2 | (0) |
| 2016–2022 | Energetik-BGU Minsk | 107 | (10) |
| 2023–2024 | Dinamo Minsk | 9 | (1) |
| 2024 | → Dinamo Brest (loan) | 26 | (3) |
| 2025 | BATE Borisov | 30 | (4) |
| 2026– | Isloch Minsk Raion | 13 | (3) |

International career^{‡}
| 2017–2018 | Belarus U19 | 2 | (0) |
| 2020 | Belarus U21 | 1 | (0) |
| 2026– | Belarus | 1 | (0) |
- * Club domestic league appearances and goals as of 3 July 2026 ‡ National team caps and goals as of 26 September 2026

Aleksandr Svirepa (Belarusian: Аляксандр Свірэпа; Russian: Александр Свирепа; born 24 August 1999) is a Belarusian professional footballer who plays for Isloch Minsk Raion and the Belarus national team.

== International career ==
On 26 September 2026, Svirepa made his debut for the Belarus national team in a 2026–27 UEFA Nations League C game against Albania.
