= Ruslan Lisakovich =

Belarusian footballer

Personal information
- Date of birth: 22 March 2002 (age 24)
- Place of birth: Maryina Gorka, Minsk Oblast, Belarus
- Height: 1.70 m (5 ft 7 in)
- Position: Midfielder

Team information
- Current team: Neman Grodno (on loan from Maxline Vitebsk)
- Number: 10

Youth career
- 2018–2019: Shakhtyor Soligorsk

Senior career*
Years	Team	Apps	(Gls)
2019	Shakhtyor Soligorsk	0	(0)
2019	→ Uzda (loan)	9	(2)
2020	Krumkachy Minsk	22	(3)
2021–2022	Isloch Minsk Raion	52	(6)
2023	Dynamo Makhachkala	20	(0)
2024	Neman Grodno	7	(0)
2024	→ Neman-2 Grodno	5	(2)
2024	Minsk	9	(0)
2025–2026	Maxline Vitebsk	42	(5)
2026–	→ Neman Grodno (loan)	5	(1)

International career^{‡}
2018–2019	Belarus U17	6	(1)
2022–2023	Belarus U21	7	(0)
2021–	Belarus	7	(0)
- * Club domestic league appearances and goals as of 6 September 2026 ‡ National team caps and goals as of 10 June 2025

Ruslan Lisakovich (Belarusian: Руслан Лісаковіч; Russian: Руслан Лисакович; born 22 March 2002) is a Belarusian professional footballer who plays for Neman Grodno (on loan from Maxline Vitebsk).

His brothers Vitali Lisakovich and Dmitry Lisakovich are also professional footballers.

== International career ==
He made his debut for the Belarus national football team on 8 September 2021 in a World Cup qualifier against Belgium, a 0–1 home loss.
