= Raymond Adeola =

Nigerian footballer (born 2001)

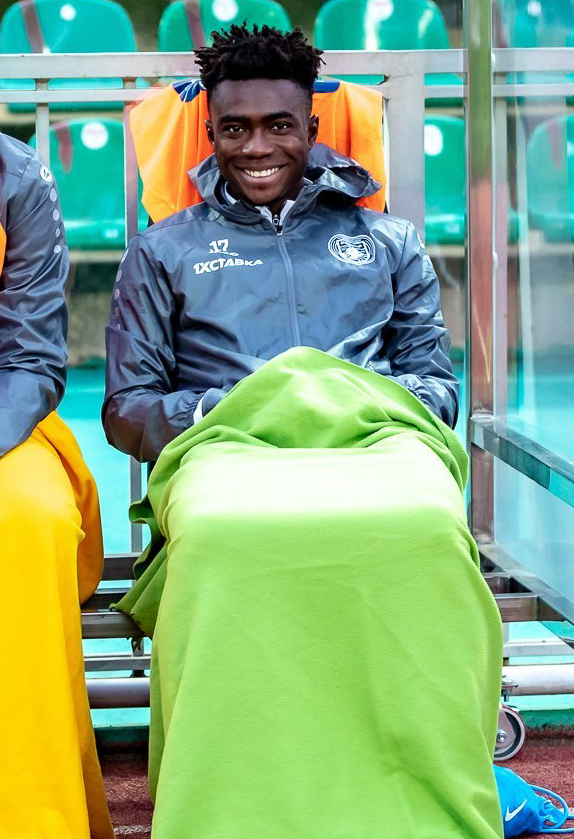
- Adeola with Rodina Moscow in 2022

Personal information
- Full name: Raymond Olamilekan Adeola
- Date of birth: 12 May 2001 (age 25)
- Place of birth: Abuja, Nigeria
- Height: 1.70 m (5 ft 7 in)
- Position: Midfielder

Team information
- Current team: Gomel
- Number: 7

Senior career*
Years	Team	Apps	(Gls)
2020–2021	Sucleia	0	(0)
2021–2022	Gomel	17	(2)
2022–2023	Rodina Moscow	8	(0)
2023	→ Gomel (loan)	14	(3)
2024	Dinamo Minsk	20	(5)
2025	Asteras Tripolis	0	(0)
2025	→ Asteras B Tripolis	4	(0)
2025	Gomel	15	(5)
2026	Serikspor	13	(1)
2026–	Gomel	7	(0)
- * Club domestic league appearances and goals as of 5 September 2026

Raymond Olamilekan Adeola (born 12 May 2001) is a Nigerian professional footballer who plays as a midfielder for Gomel.
