= Karen Vardanyan (footballer) =

Belarusian footballer (born 2003)

Personal information
- Full name: Karen Toniyevich Vardanyan
- Date of birth: 9 September 2003 (age 23)
- Place of birth: Baliny, Belarus
- Height: 1.81 m (5 ft 11 in)
- Position: Forward

Team information
- Current team: Dinamo Minsk
- Number: 10

Youth career
- Vitebsk

Senior career*
Years	Team	Apps	(Gls)
2022–2024	Vitebsk	74	(27)
2025–	Dinamo Minsk	40	(14)

International career^{‡}
2021	Belarus U19	2	(1)
2026–	Belarus	4	(1)
- * Club domestic league appearances and goals as of 12:27, 4 July 2026 (UTC) ‡ National team caps and goals as of 5 June 2026

Karen Toniyevich Vardanyan (Belarusian: Карэн Таніевіч Варданян; Russian: Карэн Тониевич Варданян; Armenian: Կարեն Վարդանյան; born 9 September 2003) is a Belarusian professional footballer who plays as a forward for Dinamo Minsk and the Belarus national team.

== Early life ==
Vardanyan was born on 9 September 2003. Born in Belarus, he is of Armenian descent through his father. Growing up, he played table tennis.

== Club career ==
As a youth player, Vardanyan joined the youth academy of Vitebsk and was promoted to the club's senior team in 2022, where he made seventy-four league appearances and scored twenty-seven goals. Following his stint there, he signed for Dinamo Minsk ahead of the 2025 season.

== International career ==
Vardanyan is a Belarus youth international. On 3 September 2021, he debuted for the Belarus national under-19 football team during a 0–1 home friendly loss to the Russia national under-18 football team.

=== International goals ===
Scores and results list Belarus' goal tally first.

No	Date	Venue	Opponent	Score	Result	Competition
1.	9 June 2026	National Football Stadium, Minsk, Belarus	Burkina Faso	2–0	2–2	Friendly
