= Yevgeny Yudchits =

Belarusian professionals footballer

Personal information
- Full name: Yevgeny Aleksandrovich Yudchits
- Date of birth: 25 November 1996 (age 29)
- Place of birth: Byaroza, Brest Oblast, Belarus
- Height: 1.80 m (5 ft 11 in)
- Position: Forward

Team information
- Current team: Isloch Minsk Raion
- Number: 99

Youth career
- DYuSSh-1 Byaroza

Senior career*
| Years | Team | Apps | (Gls) |
| 2014–2021 | Energetik-BGU Minsk | 149 | (37) |
| 2021–2023 | Dinamo Brest | 46 | (2) |
| 2024 | Isloch Minsk Raion | 30 | (3) |
| 2025 | Maxline Vitebsk | 0 | (0) |
| 2025– | Isloch Minsk Raion | 39 | (10) |
- * Club domestic league appearances and goals as of 3 July 2026

Yevgeny Aleksandrovich Yudchits (Belarusian: Яўген Аляксандравіч Юдчыц; Russian: Евгений Александрович Юдчиц; born 25 November 1996) is a Belarusian professional footballer who plays for Isloch Minsk Raion.
