= Maksim Plotnikov =

Belarusian footballer

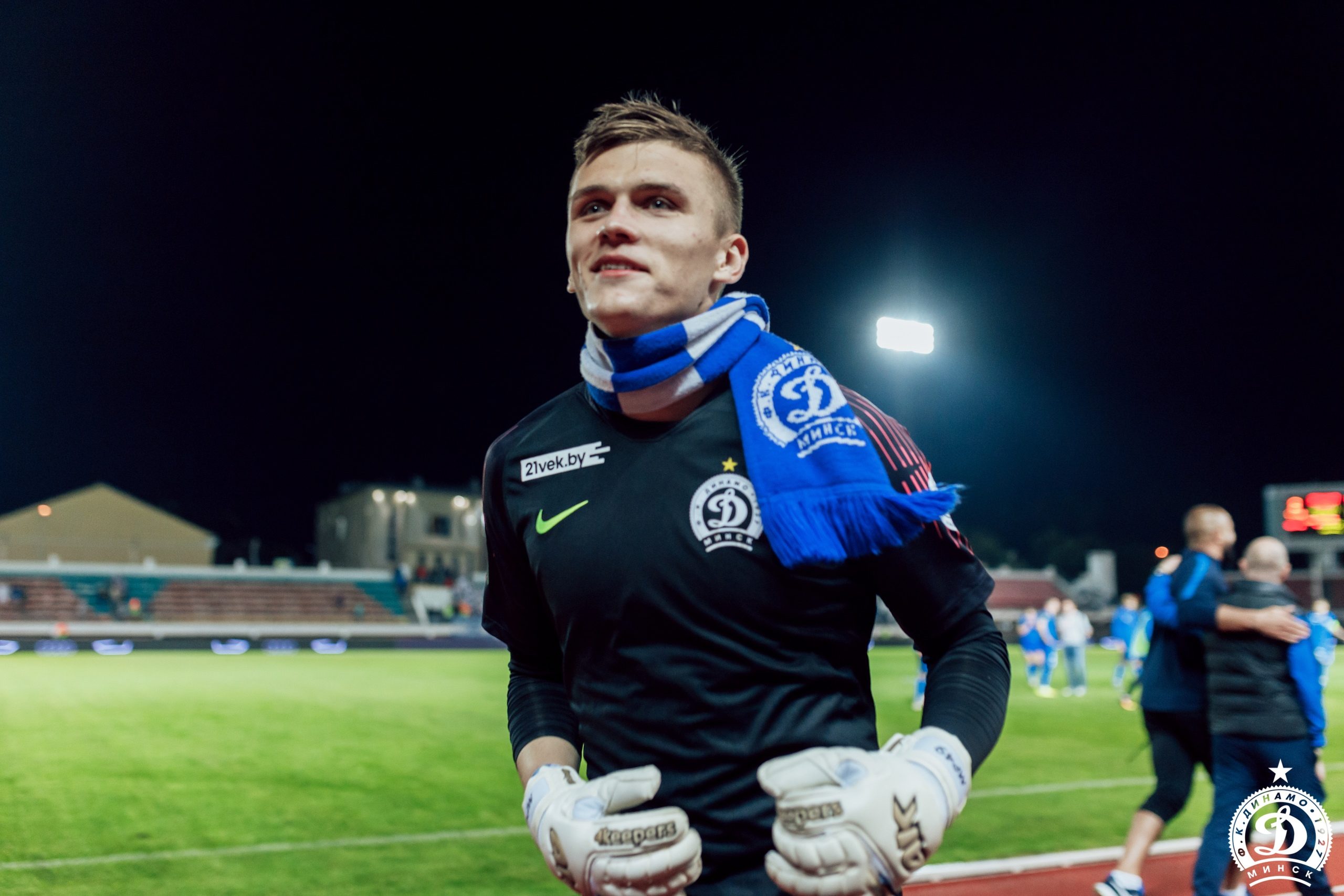

Personal information
- Date of birth: 29 January 1998 (age 28)
- Place of birth: Pinsk, Brest Oblast, Belarus
- Height: 1.87 m (6 ft 2 in)
- Position: Goalkeeper

Team information
- Current team: Zhenis
- Number: 41

Youth career
- 2013–2017: Dinamo Minsk

Senior career*
Years	Team	Apps	(Gls)
2017–2021	Dinamo Minsk	37	(0)
2017–2018	→ Luch Minsk (loan)	24	(0)
2018	→ Torpedo-BelAZ Zhodino (loan)	4	(0)
2022	Shakhtyor Soligorsk	12	(0)
2023	Caspiy	20	(0)
2024	Arsenal Dzerzhinsk	3	(0)
2024	Torpedo-BelAZ Zhodino	6	(0)
2025	Slavia Mozyr	30	(0)
2026–	Zhenis	30	(0)

International career^{‡}
2013–2015	Belarus U17	7	(0)
2018–2020	Belarus U21	4	(0)
2019–2023	Belarus	6	(0)
- * Club domestic league appearances and goals as of 1 November 2026 ‡ National team caps and goals as of 12 September 2023

Maksim Plotnikov (Belarusian: Максім Плотнікаў; Russian: Максим Плотников; born 29 January 1998) is a Belarusian professional footballer who plays for as a goalkeeper for Zhenis and the Belarus national team.
