= Aleksandr Makas =

Belarusian footballer

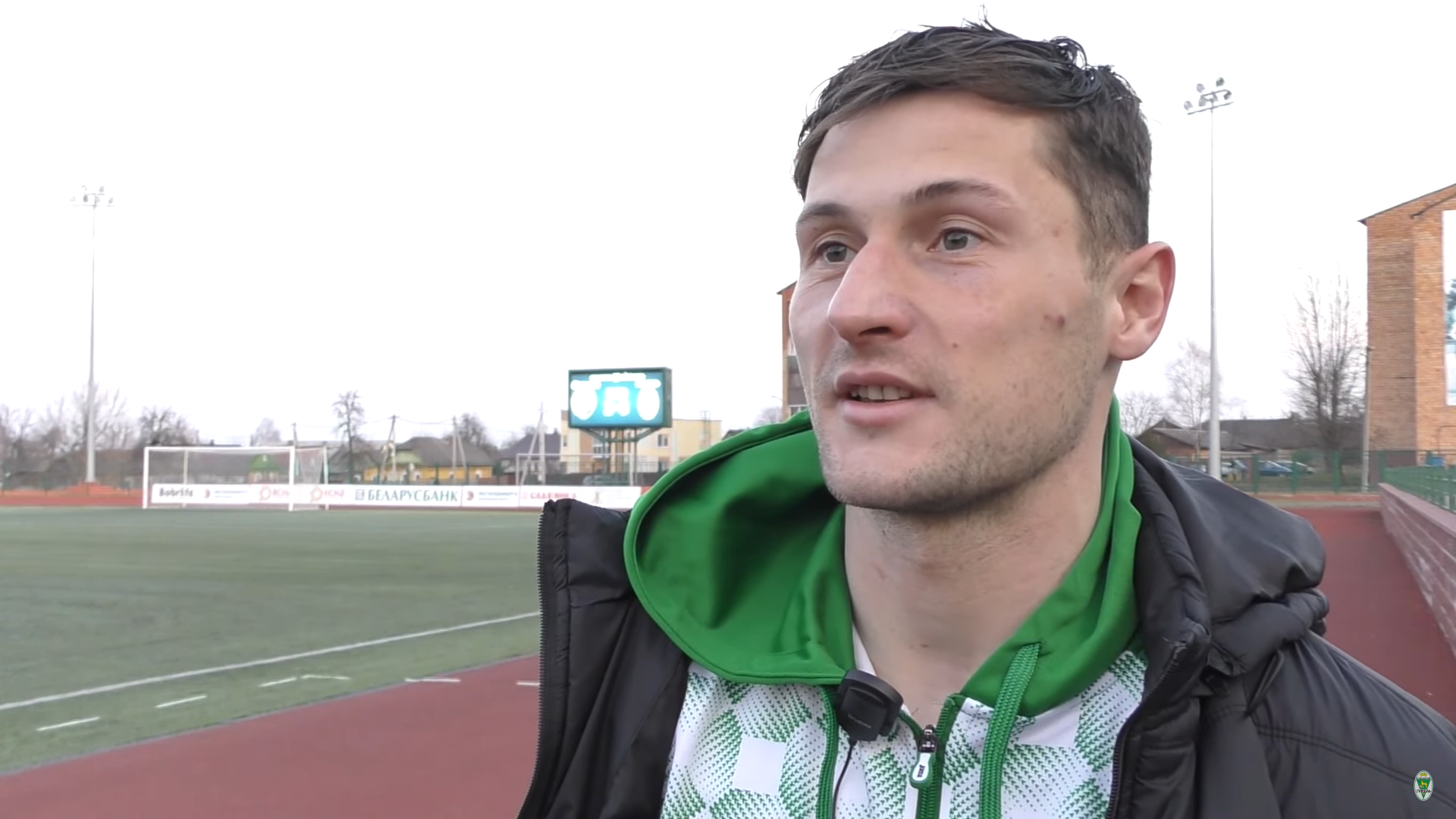

Personal information
- Full name: Aleksandr Ivanovich Makas
- Date of birth: 8 October 1991 (age 35)
- Place of birth: Minsk, Belarus
- Height: 1.79 m (5 ft 10 1/2 in)
- Position: Forward

Team information
- Current team: Minsk
- Number: 22

Youth career
- 2007–2009: MTZ-RIPO Minsk

Senior career*
Years	Team	Apps	(Gls)
2009–2011	Partizan Minsk	54	(19)
2012–2015	Minsk	74	(19)
2013	→ Minsk-2	10	(2)
2016	Atyrau	24	(1)
2017	Torpedo-BelAZ Zhodino	21	(4)
2018	Dinamo Minsk	14	(2)
2019–2020	Isloch Minsk Raion	46	(19)
2021	Sūduva	26	(5)
2022	Gomel	28	(8)
2023	Dinamo Brest	6	(0)
2023–2024	Isloch Minsk Raion	22	(7)
2025–	Minsk	35	(10)

International career^{‡}
2010–2011	Belarus U21	13	(1)
2015	Belarus	1	(0)
- * Club domestic league appearances and goals as of 6 July 2026 ‡ National team caps and goals as of 31 March 2015

Aleksandr Ivanovich Makas (Belarusian: Аляксандр Іванавіч Макась; Russian: Александр Иванович Макась; born 8 October 1991) is a Belarusian professional football player currently playing for Minsk.

== Career ==
Makas made his debut for the senior national side of his country on 30 March 2015, in a friendly match against Gabon.

== Honours ==
Minsk

- Belarusian Cup winner: 2012–13

Gomel

- Belarusian Cup winner: 2021–22
