= Yevgeny Malashevich =

Belarusian footballer

Personal information
- Full name: Yevgeny Sergeyevich Malashevich
- Date of birth: 10 December 2002 (age 23)
- Place of birth: Minsk, Belarus
- Position: Midfielder

Team information
- Current team: Dinamo Minsk
- Number: 7

Youth career
- 2018–2019: Minsk

Senior career*
Years	Team	Apps	(Gls)
2020–2024	Minsk	63	(5)
2022	→ Volna Pinsk (loan)	8	(0)
2022	→ Gomel (loan)	9	(0)
2025–	Dinamo Minsk	40	(8)
2025–	→ Dinamo-2 Minsk	1	(0)

International career^{‡}
2025–	Belarus	1	(0)
- * Club domestic league appearances and goals as of 4 July 2026 ‡ National team caps and goals as of 8 September 2025

Yevgeny Sergeyevich Malashevich (Belarusian: Яўген Сяргеевіч Малашэвіч; Russian: Евгений Сергеевич Малашевич; born 10 December 2002) is a Belarusian footballer who plays for Dinamo Minsk and the Belarus national team.
