= FC Isloch Minsk Raion =

Isloch
- Full name: Football Club Isloch
- Founded: 2007; 19 years ago
- Ground: FC Minsk Stadium, Minsk
- Capacity: 3,000
- President: Vladimir Pinchuk
- Head Coach: Dzmitry Kamarowski
- League: Belarusian Premier League
- 2025: Belarusian Premier League, 7th of 16
- Website: fcisloch.by
Home colours	Away colours

FC Isloch Minsk Raion or Islach (Belarusian: ФК Іслач; Russian: ФК Ислочь) is a Belarusian professional football club based in Minsk, although it officially represents Minsk Raion and is named after the Islach River.

== History ==
The team was founded in 2007 as an amateur club. From 2007 until 2011, it played in the Minsk Oblast championship. In 2012, Isloch joined the Belarusian Second League and, after finishing 3rd in its debut season, won promotion to the First League.

Isloch represented Belarus at the 2013 UEFA Regions' Cup. Isloch has won its qualifying group and advanced to the final phase of the competition, held in June 2013. The team has turned professional since promotion to the Belarusian First League.

In 2015, Isloch was promoted to the Belarusian Premier League for the first time in its history.

In August 2016, it was alleged that Isloch Minsk Raion assistant manager, Uladzimir Makowski, and players Alyaksandr Lebedzew, Alyaksandr Tsishkevich, Aleksandr Budakov, Aleksandr Alumona and Andrey Paryvayew, were involved in fixing their match with Dinamo Brest on 30 April 2016.

In 2019, the club reached the semi-finals of the Belarusian Cup for the first time after beating BATE Borisov in the quarter-finals. The club was eliminated in the semi-finals by Shakhtyor Soligorsk.

=== Domestic history ===
Season	League									Belarusian Cup	Top goalscorer	
Season	Div.	Pos.	Pl.	W	D	L	GS	GA	P	Belarusian Cup	Name	League
2013	2nd	9	30	11	8	11	39	37	41	First round	(Belarus) Andrey Lapshin	8
2014	2nd	7	30	11	12	7	39	35	45	Last 16	(Belarus) Andrey Misyuk	8
2015	2nd	1	30	20	9	1	76	24	69	Last 16	(Russia) Aleksandr Alumona	20
2016	1st	7	30	11	8	11	33	39	41	Last 16	(Belarus) Alyaksandr Shahoyka	6
2017	1st	11	30	10	4	16	27	46	27 *	Last 16	(Belarus) Dzmitry Asipenka	4
2018	1st	10	30	8	9	13	20	37	33	Quarter-final	(Belarus) Dzmitry Kamarowski	8
2019	1st	5	30	13	8	9	42	36	47	Semi-final	(Guinea) Momo Yansané	11
2020	1st	7	30	13	6	11	47	46	45	Quarter-final	(Belarus) Aleksandr Makas	9
2021	1st	10	30	9	7	14	38	47	34	Final	(Belarus) Dzmitry Kamarowski	8
2022	1st	5	30	16	6	8	51	33	54	Third round	(Niger) Daniel Sosah	10
2023	1st	4	30	14	5	9	40	29	47	Round of 16	(Kazakhstan) Denis Mitrofanov	9

== Isloch in Europe ==
As of 18 July 2024

Season	Competition	Round	Opponent	Home	Away	Aggregate
2024–25	UEFA Conference League	1Q	(San Marino) La Fiorita	0−1 (a.e.t.)	1−0	1−1 (2–4 p)

== Current squad ==
As of 8 September, 2026

Note: Flags indicate national team as defined under FIFA eligibility rules; some limited exceptions apply. Players may hold more than one non-FIFA nationality.

No.	Pos.	Nation	Player
1	GK	BLR	Andrey Klimovich
3	DF	BLR	Ivan Tikhomirov
4	DF	BLR	Artyom Shulunov
5	MF	BLR	Sergey Volkov
7	MF	BLR	Aleksandr Svirepa
8	MF	BLR	Anton Shramchenko
10	FW	BLR	Uladzimir Khvashchynski
11	FW	BLR	Timofey Martynov (on loan from Orenburg)
13	DF	NGR	Godfrey Bitok
15	DF	BLR	Nikita Patsko
17	MF	GEO	Sergi Abramishvili
18	DF	NGR	Mohammed Dayyabu
19	FW	NGR	Adeola Olaleye
21	DF	BLR	Vladislav Zhuravlev
22	DF	BLR	Pavel Shevchenko

No.	Pos.	Nation	Player
23	MF	BLR	Maksim Kovalevich
25	DF	BLR	Andrey Makarenko
28	GK	BLR	Aleksandr Svirskiy
29	DF	BLR	Ivan Khovalko
32	MF	BLR	Timofey Shkurdyuk
33	DF	RUS	Ilya Skrobotov
70	FW	BLR	Aleksandr Butko
74	MF	BLR	Mikhail Sachkovskiy
77	MF	BLR	Yury Krawchanka
81	GK	RUS	Ivan Erokhin
88	MF	RUS	Nikita Fadeev
99	DF	BLR	Yevgeny Yudchits
—	DF	BLR	Stepan Monich
—	MF	BLR	Ignat Stabletsky

=== Out on loan ===
Note: Flags indicate national team as defined under FIFA eligibility rules; some limited exceptions apply. Players may hold more than one non-FIFA nationality.

No.	Pos.	Nation	Player
14	DF	BLR	Artyom Poluyanov (at Lida)
35	GK	BLR	Vladislav Drozd (at Ostrovets)

== Honours ==
=== Domestic ===
- Belarusian First League
  - Champions (1): 2015
