= 2021–22 Belarusian Cup =

Tournament details
- Country: Belarus

Final positions
- Champions: Gomel
- Runners-up: BATE Borisov

2021–22 Belarusian Cup was the 31st season of the Belarusian annual cup competition. Contrary to the league season, it is conducted in a fall-spring rhythm. The tournament started in May 2021 and ended with a final match on 21 May 2022. The winner of the cup, Gomel, qualified for the second qualifying round of the 2022–23 UEFA Europa Conference League.

== Preliminary round ==
70 clubs from the Belarusian Second League and lower regional leagues entered in this round. The draw was performed on 28 April 2021. The matches were played on 8 and 9 May 2021.

| 8 May 2021 | DYuSSh Stolin (III) | w/o | Nadezhda Gorodische (III) |
| 13:00 |

| 8 May 2021 | Malorita (III) | 8–0 | Euroexport Vysokoye (III) |
| 13:00 | Natynchik 8', 23'; Grischenko 17'; Dubrov 40'; Fedortsov 43'; K. Kovalyuk 44', 78' (pen.); Tkhagolegov 68' |

| 8 May 2021 | Leskhoz Gomel (III) | 4–3 (a.e.t.) | Vertikal Kalinkovichi (III) |
| 13:00 | Barysaw 63', 89', 93'; Potemkin 102' | | Makushinsky 19'; Kashevich 34'; Tsuba 97' |

| 8 May 2021 | Gorki (III) | 1–0 | Krasnopolye (III) |
| 13:00 | Latyshev 79' |

| 8 May 2021 | Granit Mikashevichi (III) | 1–4 | Stenles Pinsk (III) |
| 14:00 | Marozaw 27' | | Khamitsevich 15'; I. Kurgan 17'; Kalyada 48'; Malaschitskiy 73' (pen.) |

| 8 May 2021 | Drogichin (III) | 0–1 | Krechet Bereza (III) |
| 14:00 | | | Salivonchik 85' (pen.) |

| 8 May 2021 | Gorodok Lions (III) | 7–0 | Chashniki (III) |
| 14:00 | Ivanow 11', 16', 54' (pen.); Garbuzov 33'; Slautin 63' (pen.); Sosnovsky 72'; Shantur 87' |

| 8 May 2021 | Miory (III) | 0–3 | Lepel (III) |
| 14:00 | | | Malinowski 50'; Nosik 76', 81' |

| 8 May 2021 | Senno (III) | 4–2 | Polotsk (III) |
| 14:00 |

| 8 May 2021 | Montazhnik Mozyr (III) | 2–1 | Bumprom Gomel (III) |
| 14:00 |

| 8 May 2021 | Molodechno (III) | 5–0 | Kolos Cherven (III) |
| 14:00 |

| 8 May 2021 | Krupki-DRSU-164 (III) | 2–1 | Yedinstvo Dzerzhinsk (III) |
| 14:00 |

| 8 May 2021 | Vilia Vileyka (III) | 0–5 | Smolevichi (III) |
| 14:00 | | | Sadovskiy 17', 41'; Korzyuk 60'; Grischenkov 68'; Lyakhnovich 80' |

| 8 May 2021 | Kopyl (III) | 0–0 (a.e.t.) (3–1 p) | Viktoriya Maryina Gorka (III) |
| 14:00 |

| 8 May 2021 | Ivatsevichi (III) | 3–0 | Ivanovo (III) |
| 15:00 |

| 8 May 2021 | Zhlobin (III) | 2–2 (4–5 p) | Svetlogorsk (III) |
| 15:00 |

| 8 May 2021 | Berezino (III) | 0–4 | Falco Dzerzhinsk Raion (III) |
| 15:00 |

| 8 May 2021 | Lyuban (III) | 2–5 | Kletsk (III) |
| 15:00 |

| 8 May 2021 | FSK Grodnenskiy (III) | 1–0 (a.e.t.) | Chayka Zelva (III) |
| 15:30 |

| 8 May 2021 | FSK Oshmyany (III) | 1–0 | Smena Volkovysk (III) |
| 16:00 |

| 8 May 2021 | Brestzhilstroy (III) | 2–0 | Niva Dolbizno (III) |
| 17:30 |

| 9 May 2021 | BGU Minsk (III) | 3–0 | Spartak Slutsk (III) |
| 12:00 |

| 9 May 2021 | Starye Dorogi (III) | 5–3 (a.e.t.) | Nesvizh (III) |
| 12:00 |

| 9 May 2021 | Prodtsentr Vitebsk (III) | 0–2 | Gazovik Vitebsk (III) |
| 13:00 |

| 9 May 2021 | Energetik-BGATU Minsk (III) | 0–2 | Partizan Soligorsk (III) |
| 13:00 |

| 9 May 2021 | Luninets (III) | 5–2 | Novaya Pripyat Olshany (III) |
| 14:00 |

| 9 May 2021 | Niva Tolochin (III) | 3–1 (a.e.t.) | AviaDor Orsha (III) |
| 14:00 |

| 9 May 2021 | Atlant Kobrin (III) | 5–1 | Pruzhany (III) |
| 14:00 |

| 9 May 2021 | Postavy (III) | 2–1 | Glubokoye (III) |
| 14:00 |

| 9 May 2021 | Ostrovets (III) | 11–0 | Slonim City (III) |
| 14:00 |

| 9 May 2021 | Belaya Rus Dyatlovo (III) | 1–1 (0–3 p) | Mosty (III) |
| 15:00 |

| 9 May 2021 | Svisloch (III) | 0–5 | ZhKKh Grodno (III) |
| 15:00 |

| 9 May 2021 | Dnepr Rogachev (III) | 6–0 | MNPZ Mozyr (III) |
| 16:00 |

| 9 May 2021 | Schuchin (III) | 1–2 | Tsementnik Krasnoselsky (III) |
| 16:00 |

| 9 May 2021 | Uzda (III) | 4–2 | Urozhaynaya (A) |
| 16:00 |

== First round ==
35 winners of Preliminary Round were joined by another 5 clubs from the Belarusian Second League. The draw was performed on 28 April 2021. The matches were played on 22 and 23 May 2021.

| 22 May 2021 | Falco Dzerzhinsk Raion (III) | 2–7 | Molodechno (III) |
| 13:00 |

| 22 May 2021 | Atlant Kobrin (III) | 3–2 | Krechet Bereza (III) |
| 14:00 | | | Mishkovich 89'; Volk 90+1' |

| 22 May 2021 | Postavy (III) | 0–1 | Gazovik Vitebsk (III) |
| 14:00 |

| 22 May 2021 | Svetlogorsk (III) | 1–3 | Dnepr Rogachev (III) |
| 14:00 |

| 22 May 2021 | Osipovichi (III) | 2–1 | Gorki (III) |
| 14:00 | | | Khaustovich 15' |

| 22 May 2021 | Stenles Pinsk (III) | 5–0 | Luninets (III) |
| 15:00 | Malaschitskiy 20', 81'; O. Kurgan 32'; Khamitsevich 74', 77' |

| 22 May 2021 | Lepel (III) | 3–1 (a.e.t.) | Niva Tolochin (III) |
| 15:00 | Skakun 62'; Vashkevich 104'; Nosik 108' |

| 22 May 2021 | SMIautotrans Smolevichi (III) | 1–3 | Smolevichi (III) |
| 15:00 | | | Pyatrovich 30'; Sadovskiy 65'; Chekaldin 88' |

| 22 May 2021 | Malorita (III) | 4–2 (a.e.t.) | Brestzhilstroy (III) |
| 17:00 | Grischenko 21' (pen.); Dubrov 60'; K. Kovalyuk 100'; Prokopchuk 105+1' |

| 22 May 2021 | Kopyl (III) | 2–1 | BGU Minsk (III) |
| 17:00 |

| 22 May 2021 | Kletsk (III) | 0–3 | Kronon Stolbtsy (III) |
| 17:30 |

| 23 May 2021 | DYuSSh Stolin (III) | 2–8 | Ivatsevichi (III) |
| 13:00 |

| 23 May 2021 | Gorodok Lions (III) | 0–1 (a.e.t.) | Senno (III) |
| 14:00 |

| 23 May 2021 | Leskhoz Gomel (III) | 4–1 | Montazhnik Mozyr (III) |
| 15:00 | Zatenko 23'; Tarasyuk 58', 62', 90' | | Kabeshev 75' (o.g.) |

| 23 May 2021 | FSK Oshmyany (III) | 1–2 (a.e.t.) | FSK Grodnenskiy (III) |
| 16:00 |

| 23 May 2021 | Mosty (III) | 3–5 (a.e.t.) | Tsementnik Krasnoselsky (III) |
| 16:00 |

| 23 May 2021 | Partizan Soligorsk (III) | 5–1 | Starye Dorogi (III) |
| 16:00 |

| 23 May 2021 | ZhKKh Grodno (III) | 0–2 | Ostrovets (III) |
| 18:00 |

| 23 May 2021 | Spartak Shklov (III) | 1–2 (a.e.t.) | Kostyukovichi (III) |
| 18:00 |

| 23 May 2021 | Uzda (III) | 5–1 | Krupki-DRSU-164 (III) |
| 18:00 |

== Second round ==
20 winners of previous round were joined by 10 clubs from the Belarusian First League. The draw was performed on 24 May 2021. The matches were played between 29 May and 16 June 2021.

| 29 May 2021 | Dnepr Rogachev (III) | 2–4 (a.e.t.) | Volna Pinsk (II) | Rogachev |
| 13:00 | Burets 79'; Trapashko 108' | Report | Gradoboyev 41'; Gubanov 95', 112'; Teslyuk 99' | Stadium: DYuSSh-1 Stadium; Attendance: 350; Referee: Viktor Shimusik (Osipovichi) |

| 29 May 2021 | Senno (III) | 1–6 | Lokomotiv Gomel (II) | Senno |
| 13:00 | Davydenko 43' (pen.) | Report | Lavrishchev 20' (pen.); Azersky 75', 80' | Stadium: City Stadium; Attendance: 55; Referee: Vitaliy Poltarzhitskiy (Chervyen) |

| 29 May 2021 | Gazovik Vitebsk (III) | 1–8 | Naftan Novopolotsk (II) | Vitebsk |
| 15:00 | Morozov 66' | Report | Tamelo 14' (pen.), 23', 29', 50'; Kleschenok 27'; Krotaw 45'; Rassolko 47'; Plyasunow 90' | Stadium: Vitebsky CSK; Attendance: 100; Referee: Maksim Kachalyuk (Brest) |

| 29 May 2021 | Ostrovets (III) | 1–1 (a.e.t.) (1–4 p) | Baranovichi (II) | Ostrovets |
| 16:00 | Fazylov 120+1' | Report | Artyukh 120' | Stadium: City Stadium; Attendance: 200; Referee: Stanislav Ananyev (Vitebsk) |
| | Penalties |
| | Lovgach (penalty missed); Fazylov (penalty missed); Koshko (penalty scored) | | (penalty scored) Silinskiy; (penalty scored) Guzov; (penalty scored) Makaraw; (penalty scored) Chekhov |

| 29 May 2021 | Ivatsevichi (III) | 0–5 | Arsenal Dzerzhinsk (II) | Ivatsevichy |
| 16:00 | | Report | Senko 25'; Lovets 30' (pen.); Kiyko 62', 72'; Kovalevich 70' | Stadium: Klenovka Arena; Attendance: 120; Referee: Aleksandr Volkov (Minsk) |

| 29 May 2021 | Atlant Kobrin (III) | 0–3 | Belshina Bobruisk (II) | Kobrin |
| 16:00 | | Report | Vashkevich 23'; Vasilyev 42'; Barkovskiy 48' (pen.) | Stadium: Yunost Stadium; Attendance: 210; Referee: Nikita Shiyan (Dzerzhinsk) |

| 29 May 2021 | Stenles Pinsk (III) | 3–2 | Slonim-2017 (II) |
| 17:00 | Movchun 26', 56'; Borichevskiy 38' | | Chernodarov 12'; Y. Lebedzew 16' |

| 29 May 2021 | Malorita (III) | 11–0 | Kostyukovichi (III) |
| 17:00 | K. Kovalyuk 8', 20'; Fedortsov 23', 43'; Dubrov 45'; Sergali 48'; Natynchik 54'; Tkhagolegov 67'; S. Kovalyuk 84', 90+4'; Chizh 90' |

| 29 May 2021 | Kronon Stolbtsy (III) | 1–4 | Dnepr Mogilev (II) |
| 17:30 | Alekseyenko 83' | | Boltrushevich 36'; Myat 40' (o.g.); Sen 53'; Mukhamedov 85' |

| 30 May 2021 | Tsementnik Krasnoselsky (III) | 0–3 | Partizan Soligorsk (III) |
| 13:00 | | | Dubovskiy 12'; Protaschik 61' (pen.); Kakhnovich 83' (o.g.) |

| 30 May 2021 | Osipovichi (III) | 1–2 | Molodechno (III) |
| 14:00 | Komlev 7' | | Saramakha 4'; Tarchilo 77' |

| 30 May 2021 | Kopyl (III) | 0–4 | Orsha (II) |
| 14:00 | | | Zyanko 37' (pen.); Barachenya 46' (o.g.); Lutik 55'; Zheleznikov 75' |

| 30 May 2021 | Lepel (III) | 0–1 | Smolevichi (III) |
| 14:00 | | | Stryzheus 24' (pen.) |

| 30 May 2021 | FSK Grodnenskiy (III) | 1–6 | Lida (II) |
| 15:00 | Chernik 61' | | Kazantsev 10'; Veremeychik 28'; Cherivkhanov 41'; Dabravolski 81' (pen.); Karp 85'; Maiboroda 89' |

| 16 June 2021 | Leskhoz Gomel (III) | 1–1 (a.e.t.) (2–4 p) | Uzda (III) |
| 18:00 | Zhigulich 41' | | Varaksa 90+2' |
| | Penalties |
| | Arhiptsaw (penalty missed); Tarasyuk (penalty scored); Chirik (penalty scored); Barysaw (penalty missed) | | (penalty scored) Lapshin; (penalty scored) Botyanovskiy; (penalty scored) Lukashevich; (penalty scored) Sakovich |

== Third round ==
15 winners of previous round were joined by 1 club from Belarusian First League and 16 clubs from Belarusian Premier League. The draw was performed on 1 June 2021. The matches were played between 22 June and 19 July 2021.

| 22 June 2021 | Krumkachy Minsk (II) | 1–1 (a.e.t.) (4–5 p) | Neman Grodno | Minsk |
| 18:00 | Ivanow 2' | Report | Zubovich 90+5' | Stadium: SOK Olimpiysky; Attendance: 789; Referee: Aleksei Kulbakov (Gomel) |
| | Penalties |
| | Likhtin (penalty scored); D. Lebedzew (penalty scored); Levkovets (penalty missed); Veras (penalty scored); Kolyadko (penalty scored) | | (penalty scored) Zhukowski; (penalty scored) Zabelin; (penalty scored) Kazlow; (penalty scored) Yablonskiy; (penalty scored) Zubovich |

| 22 June 2021 | Baranovichi (II) | 1–6 | BATE Borisov | Ivatsevichy |
| 18:30 | Makaraw 2' | Report | Vasilevich 51', 53'; Sharkovskiy 56'; Bessmertny 68'; Nuradeen 85', 88' | Stadium: Klenovka Arena; Attendance: 790; Referee: Aleksey Obelevskiy (Grodno) |

| 22 June 2021 | Volna Pinsk (II) | 0–1 | Slavia Mozyr | Pinsk |
| 18:45 | | Report | Slyusar 13' (pen.) | Stadium: Volna Stadium; Attendance: 530; Referee: Yevgeniy Naumov (Minsk) |

| 22 June 2021 | Orsha (II) | 2–6 | Gomel | Orsha |
| 19:00 | Zakharov 14'; Naumovich 71' (o.g.) | Report | Tseslyukevich 12'; Pashevich 55'; Solovey 61'; Sajčić 65'; Adeola 87'; Vaskow 90+4' | Stadium: City Stadium; Attendance: 210; Referee: Denis Tarasyuk (Brest) |

| 22 June 2021 | Molodechno (III) | 0–4 | Energetik-BGU Minsk | Molodechno |
| 19:15 | | Report | V. Vasilyev 25'; Miroshnikov 69'; Diallo 79'; Rylach 89' | Stadium: City Stadium; Attendance: 450; Referee: Dmitry Dubatovka (Lida) |

| 22 June 2021 | Arsenal Dzerzhinsk (II) | 2–1 | Smorgon | Gorodeya |
| 19:30 | Kiyko 56'; Lovets 73' | Report | Khankevich 54' | Stadium: Gorodeya Stadium; Attendance: 100; Referee: Sergey Chistov (Minsk) |

| 22 June 2021 | Dnepr Mogilev (II) | 2–1 | Minsk | Mogilev |
| 20:00 | Chmyrikov 41', 83' | Report | Bogomolskiy 85' | Stadium: Spartak Stadium; Attendance: 1,320; Referee: Sergey Lobatsevich (Vitebsk) |

| 23 June 2021 | Malorita (III) | 1–2 | Slutsk | Malorita |
| 17:45 | Brinchuk 84' | Report | Sasin 42'; Klochkov 49' | Stadium: City Stadium; Attendance: 450; Referee: Pavel Koronets (Zhodino) |

| 23 June 2021 | Belshina Bobruisk (II) | 1–3 | Rukh Brest | Bobruisk |
| 18:00 | Rusak 35' | Report | Bakaj 30'; Savitski 41' (pen.); Grechikho 49' | Stadium: Spartak Stadium; Attendance: 350; Referee: Sergey Krasnikov (Grodno) |

| 23 June 2021 | Lokomotiv Gomel (II) | 3–3 (a.e.t.) (4–2 p) | Isloch Minsk Raion | Gomel |
| 18:30 | Kozlovskiy 44', 90+1'; Sychev 64' (pen.) | Report | Yusov 6', 62'; Kozyrenko 82' | Stadium: Lokomotiv Stadium; Attendance: 200; Referee: Sergey Tsinkevich (Osipovichi) |
| | Penalties |
| | Azersky (penalty scored); Jumaýew (penalty scored); Trofimchuk (penalty scored); Lavrishchev (penalty scored) | | (penalty missed) D. Lisakovich; (penalty scored) Myakish; (penalty scored) Zinovich; (penalty missed) Kozyrenko |

| 23 June 2021 | Smolevichi (III) | 1–3 | Vitebsk | Oktyabrsky |
| 18:45 | Sadovskiy 40' (pen.) | Report | Kaloshkin 79'; Rassadkin 88', 90+1' | Stadium: FOK Oktyabrsky; Attendance: 110; Referee: Vadim Lenkovskiy (Minsk) |

| 23 June 2021 | Lida (II) | 0–3 | Dinamo Minsk | Lida |
| 19:00 | | Report | Poé 58'; Latykhov 64', 80' | Stadium: Yunost Stadium; Attendance: 470; Referee: Sergey Stetsurin (Brest) |

| 23 June 2021 | Partizan Soligorsk (III) | 2–2 (a.e.t.) (1–3 p) | Sputnik Rechitsa | Soligorsk |
| 19:30 | Antonyuk 11'; Korotkevich 105' | Report | Sanets 59', 105+2' | Stadium: Shakhtyor Stadium; Attendance: 400; Referee: Aleksey Shipitsa (Grodno) |
| | Penalties |
| | Dubovskiy (penalty missed); Svirikhin (penalty scored); Dostanko (penalty missed); Kupriyanovich (penalty missed) | | (penalty scored) Kontsedaylov; (penalty missed) Yasinski; (penalty scored) Monastyrskiy; (penalty missed) Kurlovich; (penalty scored) Bahdanaw |

| 10 July 2021 | Naftan Novopolotsk (II) | 2–2 (a.e.t.) (4–5 p) | Dinamo Brest | Novopolotsk |
| 16:30 | Rassolko 2'; Tamelo 28' | Report | Sanusi 86'; Lynko 90+2' | Stadium: Atlant Stadium; Attendance: 800; Referee: Pavel Koronets (Zhodino) |
| | Penalties |
| | Barysaw (penalty scored); Krasiy (penalty scored); Melnik (penalty missed); Kleschenok (penalty scored); Dovgyallo (penalty scored) | | (penalty scored) Bilenkyi; (penalty scored) Alyakhnovich; (penalty scored) Sedko; (penalty scored) Shestyuk; (penalty scored) Yasyukevich |

| 10 July 2021 | Stenles Pinsk (III) | 0–2 | Torpedo-BelAZ Zhodino | Pinsk |
| 18:30 | | Report | Habovda 18'; Aussi 31' | Stadium: Football Academy Stadium; Attendance: 225; Referee: Viktor Shimusik (Osipovichi) |

| 19 July 2021 | Uzda (III) | 0–3 | Shakhtyor Soligorsk | Uzda |
| 18:30 | | Report | Kozel 20'; Padstrelaw 44'; Karpitskiy 90+1' | Stadium: City Stadium; Attendance: 750; Referee: Igor Shumilov (Minsk) |

== Round of 16 ==
The draw was performed on 13 July 2021. The matches were played between 7 and 9 August 2021.

| 7 August 2021 | Sputnik Rechitsa | w/o | Dnepr Mogilev (II) |

| 7 August 2021 | Energetik-BGU Minsk | 0–4 | Neman Grodno | Borisov |
| 15:00 | | Report | Zhukowski 5'; Lyahchylin 35'; Gribovskiy 66'; Dzhigero 85' | Stadium: City Stadium; Attendance: 50; Referee: Sergey Stetsurin (Brest) |

| 7 August 2021 | Slutsk | 0–4 | Dinamo Minsk | Slutsk |
| 17:00 | | | Bakhar 10' (pen.); Klimovich 17'; Davyskiba 74', 77' | Stadium: City Stadium; Attendance: 940; Referee: Dmitriy Markov (Mogilev) |

| 7 August 2021 | Vitebsk | 0–0 (a.e.t.) (5–4 p) | Arsenal Dzerzhinsk (II) | Vitebsk |
| 19:00 | | Report | | Stadium: Vitebsky CSK; Attendance: 808; Referee: Sergey Gorayutin (Minsk) |
| | Penalties |
| | Wanderson (penalty missed); Matsveenka (penalty scored); Krasnov (penalty scored); Shamruk (penalty scored); Rassadkin (penalty scored); Lebedzew (penalty scored) | | (penalty scored) Senko; (penalty scored) Vegerya; (penalty scored) Khvalko; (penalty missed) Kiyko; (penalty scored) Asipenka; (penalty missed) Sazonovich |

| 8 August 2021 | Slavia Mozyr | 1–2 | BATE Borisov | Mozyr |
| 15:30 | Zherdev 51' | Report | Signevich 4'; Yablonskiy 90+4' | Stadium: Yunost Stadium; Attendance: 2,120; Referee: Anton Lashuk (Minsk) |

| 8 August 2021 | Torpedo-BelAZ Zhodino | 0–0 (a.e.t.) (5–4 p) | Lokomotiv Gomel (II) | Zhodino |
| 18:00 | | Report | | Stadium: Torpedo Stadium; Attendance: 850; Referee: Aleksey Obelevskiy (Grodno) |
| | Penalties |
| | A. Antilevsky (penalty scored); Oya (penalty scored); D. Antilevsky (penalty scored); Nosko (penalty scored); Makaraw (penalty scored) | | (penalty scored) Azersky; (penalty scored) Kovalev; (penalty scored) Trofimchuk; (penalty scored) Voyna; (penalty missed) Kukharyonok |

| 8 August 2021 | Dinamo Brest | 2–0 | Rukh Brest | Brest |
| 20:00 | Shestyuk 8'; Sedko 51' | | | Stadium: OSK Brestsky; Attendance: 5,631; Referee: Amin Kurgheli (Gomel) |

| 9 August 2021 | Shakhtyor Soligorsk | 1–2 (a.e.t.) | Gomel | Soligorsk |
| 19:00 | Darboe 20' | Report | Pobudey 74'; Solovey 107' | Stadium: Stroitel Stadium; Attendance: 1,653; Referee: Viktor Shimusik (Osipovichi) |

== Quarter-finals ==
| Team 1 | Agg. | Team 2 | 1st leg | 2nd leg |
|---|---|---|---|---|
| Dinamo Minsk | 2–4 | Gomel | 1–1 | 1–3 |
| Vitebsk | 2–1 | Dinamo Brest | 2–0 | 0–1 |
| Neman Grodno | 3–0 | Dnepr Mogilev | 3–0 | 0–0 |
| BATE Borisov | 2–1 | Torpedo-BelAZ Zhodino | 1–1 | 1–0 |

=== First leg ===
| 6 March 2022 | Dinamo Minsk | 1–1 | Gomel | Minsk |
| 14:00 | Baradzin 48' (pen.) | Report | Makas 64' (pen.) | Stadium: Dinamo-Yuni Stadium; Attendance: 410; Referee: Pavel Koronets (Zhodino) |

| 6 March 2022 | Vitebsk | 2–0 | Dinamo Brest | Vitebsk |
| 16:00 | Teverov 6'; Lebedzew 56' | Report | | Stadium: CSK Vitebsky; Attendance: 770; Referee: Sergey Gorayutin (Minsk) |

| 7 March 2022 | Neman Grodno | 3–0 | Dnepr Mogilev | Grodno |
| 16:00 | Zhukowski 43' (pen.), 58'; Zubovich 68' | Report | | Stadium: Neman Stadium; Attendance: 1,000; Referee: Amin Kurgheli (Gomel) |

| 9 March 2022 | BATE Borisov | 1–1 | Torpedo-BelAZ Zhodino | Minsk |
| 16:30 | Willumsson 67' | Report | Beryozkin 5' | Stadium: Dinamo-Yuni Stadium; Attendance: 250; Referee: Sergey Stetsurin (Brest) |

=== Second leg ===
| 12 March 2022 | Gomel | 3–1 (4–2 agg.) | Dinamo Minsk | Gomel |
| 15:00 | Gogolashvili 18'; Potapenko 39'; Begunov 86' (o.g.) | Report | Bakić 45+1' | Stadium: SDYuSShOR-8 Stadium; Attendance: 800; Referee: Viktor Shimusik (Osipovichi) |

| 12 March 2022 | Dinamo Brest | 1–0 (1–2 agg.) | Vitebsk | Brest |
| 19:00 | Yasyukevich 64' | Report | | Stadium: OSK Brestsky; Attendance: 1,211; Referee: Anton Lashuk (Minsk) |

| 13 March 2022 | Dnepr Mogilev | 0–0 (0–3 agg.) | Neman Grodno | Mogilev |
| 13:00 | | Report | | Stadium: Dnepr Stadium; Attendance: 500; Referee: Dmitry Dmitriyev (Fanipol) |

| 13 March 2022 | Torpedo-BelAZ Zhodino | 0–1 (1–2 agg.) | BATE Borisov | Minsk |
| 19:00 | | Report | Milić 55' | Stadium: SOK Olimpiysky; Attendance: 520; Referee: Sergey Chistov (Minsk) |

== Semi-finals ==
| Team 1 | Agg. | Team 2 | 1st leg | 2nd leg |
|---|---|---|---|---|
| Gomel | 2–1 | Vitebsk | 2–0 | 0–1 |
| Neman Grodno | 2–3 | BATE Borisov | 2–1 | 0–2 |

=== First leg ===
| 6 April 2022 | Neman Grodno | 2–1 | BATE Borisov | Grodno |
| 17:00 | Savitski 55'; Kadimyan 72' | Report | Milić 12' | Stadium: Neman Stadium; Attendance: 1,100; Referee: Aleksei Kulbakov (Gomel) |

| 7 April 2022 | Gomel | 2–0 | Vitebsk | Gomel |
| 17:00 | Yermakovich 45'; Aleksiyevich 57' | Report | | Stadium: SDYuSShOR-8 Stadium; Attendance: 700; Referee: Viktor Shimusik (Osipovichi) |

=== Second leg ===
| 27 April 2022 | Vitebsk | 1–0 (1–2 agg.) | Gomel | Vitebsk |
| 17:00 | Costrov 65' (o.g.) | Report | | Stadium: Vitebsky CSK; Attendance: 680; Referee: Sergey Chistov (Minsk) |

| 27 April 2022 | BATE Borisov | 2–0 (3–2 agg.) | Neman Grodno | Borisov |
| 19:30 | Drahun 39'; Shumansky 90+4' | Report | | Stadium: Haradski Stadium; Attendance: 3,100; Referee: Sergey Stetsurin (Brest) |

== Final ==
The final was played on 21 May 2022 at Dinamo Stadium in Minsk.

21 May 2022
19:00 UTC+3

| BATE Borisov | 1–2 | Gomel |
|---|---|---|
| J. Filipović 21' | Report | Bardachow 62' (o.g.); Matsveychyk 67' |

Dinamo Stadium, Minsk
Attendance: 10,587
Referee: Vitaly Sevostyanik (Grodno)

BATE:
| GK | 35 | (Belarus) Andrey Kudravets |
| RB | 17 | (Belarus) Danila Nechayev |
| CB | 32 | (Croatia) Jakov Filipović |
| CB | 21 | (Belarus) Maksim Bardachow |
| LB | 4 | (Serbia) Aleksandar Filipović |
| CM | 22 | (Belarus) Aleksey Nosko | (substituted off) 73' |
| CM | 18 | (Iceland) Willum Þór Willumsson |
| CM | 8 | (Belarus) Stanislaw Drahun (c) |
| RW | 19 | (Belarus) Dmitry Bessmertny | (substituted off) 63' |
| CF | 26 | (Serbia) Nemanja Milić |
| LW | 44 | (Belarus) Vladislav Malkevich |
Substitutes:
| GK | 51 | (Belarus) Vyacheslav Dergachev |
| MF | 6 | (Guinea) Yamoussa Camara |
| FW | 7 | (Belarus) Mikita Nyakrasaw |
| MF | 14 | (Belarus) Sergey Sazonchik |
| MF | 23 | (Belarus) Valery Gromyko | (substituted on) 73' |
| DF | 92 | (Belarus) Maksim Valadzko |
| FW | 99 | (Belarus) Artem Shumanskiy | (substituted on) 63' |
Manager:
(Belarus) Aleksandr Mikhaylov

GOMEL:
| GK | 44 | (Belarus) Denis Sadovsky | (yellow card) 89' |
| RB | 3 | (Belarus) Syarhey Matsveychyk |
| CB | 5 | (Ivory Coast) Yann Emmanuel Affi |
| CB | 6 | (Belarus) Artyom Sokol |
| LB | 19 | (Belarus) Konstantin Kuchinsky |
| DM | 8 | (Moldova) Igor Costrov (c) |
| DM | 13 | (Belarus) Illya Aleksiyevich |
| RW | 17 | (Belarus) Andrey Potapenko | | (substituted off) 56' |
| CAM | 9 | (Belarus) Aleksandr Anufriyev | | (substituted off) 88' |
| LW | 14 | (Nigeria) Raymond Adeola | | (substituted off) 90+3' |
| FW | 7 | (Georgia (country)) Giorgi Gogolashvili | (yellow card) 33' | (substituted off) 82' |
Substitutes:
| GK | 87 | (Belarus) Aleh Kavalyow |
| DF | 2 | (Belarus) Daniil Miroshnikov |
| DF | 4 | (Ukraine) Yuriy Pantya | | (substituted on) 82' |
| FW | 23 | (Belarus) Vasily Sovpel | | (substituted on) 56' |
| DF | 25 | (Belarus) Ihar Kuzmyanok | | (substituted on) 90+3' |
| MF | 27 | (Belarus) Kirill Yermakovich | | (substituted on) 88' |
| MF | 97 | (Belarus) Nikita Tsarenko |
Manager:
(Belarus) Vladimir Nevinsky
