= 2023 Belarusian Super Cup =

Gomel	Shakhtyor Soligorsk
0	1
- Date: 25 February 2023
- Venue: Dinamo-Yuni Stadium, Minsk
- Referee: Viktor Shimusik
- Attendance: 2,950

The 2023 Belarusian Super Cup was held on 25 February 2023 between the 2022 Belarusian Premier League champions Shakhtyor Soligorsk and the 2021–22 Belarusian Cup winners Gomel. Shakhtyor Soligorsk won the match 1–0 and won the trophy for the second time. This was the third consecutive year that the Soligorsk were vying for the cup, having won on penalties in 2021 against BATE Borisov and losing to the same team in the 2022 edition.

== Match details ==
25 February 2023
16:00 UTC+3

Gomel	0–1	Shakhtyor Soligorsk
	Report	Placca 34'

Dinamo-Yuni Stadium, Minsk
Attendance: 2,950
Referee: Viktor Shimusik (Osipovichi)

GOMEL:
GK	1	(Belarus) Aleh Kavalyow
RB	3	(Belarus) Sergey Matveychik (c)
CB	5	(Belarus) Daniil Miroshnikov
CB	30	(Belarus) Yegor Troyakov
CB	25	(Belarus) Ihar Kuzmyanok
LB	19	(Belarus) Konstantin Kuchinsky		(substituted off) 46'
CM	11	(Belarus) Yury Lovets
CM	54	(Turkey) Furkan Akın
RW	10	(Belarus) Alyaksandar Savitski		(substituted off) 82'
LW	9	(Belarus) Aleksandr Anufriyev	(yellow card) 19'	(substituted off) 74'
CF	20	(Belarus) Denis Kozlovskiy		(substituted off) 82'
Substitutes:
GK	71	(Belarus) Aleksandr Naumovich
DF	4	(Belarus) Artem Shkurdyuk
MF	7	(Belarus) Artyom Kiyko		(substituted on) 82'
MF	17	(Belarus) Andrey Potapenko		(substituted on) 46'
MF	21	(Belarus) Vladislav Drapeza
DF	22	(Belarus) Kiryl Shawchenka		(substituted on) 82'
MF	27	(Belarus) Kirill Yermakovich		(substituted on) 74'
MF	44	(Belarus) Stanislav Izhakovsky
MF	97	(Belarus) Nikita Tsarenko
Manager:
(Belarus) Vladimir Nevinsky

SHAKHTYOR:
GK	32	(Belarus) Syarhey Chernik
RB	99	(Belarus) Gleb Shevchenko
CB	22	(Belarus) Nikita Baranok	(yellow card) 90+4'
CB	28	(Belarus) Pavel Zabelin
LB	12	(Belarus) Denis Gruzhevsky
RM	8	(Albania) Ardit Krymi
CM	18	(Belarus) Nikita Korzun (c)		(substituted off) 90+1'
LM	55	(Belarus) Nikita Kaplenko
RW	10	(Albania) Valon Ahmedi		(substituted off) 65'
LW	13	(Belarus) Andrey Solovey		(substituted off) 54'
CF	11	(Togo) Euloge Placca Fessou
Substitutes:
GK	1	(Belarus) Syarhey Ignatovich
DF	2	(Belarus) Andrey Makarenko
DF	4	(Belarus) Semyon Shestilovsky
FW	7	(Uzbekistan) Shakhzod Ubaydullaev
FW	9	(Belarus) Maksim Skavysh		(substituted on) 54'
DF	14	(Belarus) Ilya Lukashevich
FW	20	(Belarus) Anton Shramchenko		(substituted on) 65'
MF	23	(Belarus) Maksim Kovalevich
MF	29	(Belarus) Andrey Kabyshev
FW	92	(Belarus) Yegor Karpitsky
MF	96	(Belarus) Ivan Zenkov		(substituted on) 90+1'
DF	97	(Belarus) Ilya Sviridenko
Manager:
(Belarus) Aleksey Baga

== See also ==
- 2022 Belarusian Premier League
- 2021–22 Belarusian Cup
