= Aleh =

Aleh is a transliteration from Belarusian Алег of the Eastern Slavic name Oleg. It is sometimes spelled as "Aleg". Notable people with the name include:

== Surname ==
- Jo Aleh (born 1986), New Zealand sailor, national champion, world champion, Olympic champion

== Given name ==
- Aleh Ahiyevich (born 1993), Belarusian racing cyclist
- Aleh Akhrem (born 1983), Belarusian volleyball coach and player
- Aleh Byabenin (c. 1974–2010), Belarusian journalist
- Aleh Chakunkov, Belarusian diplomat
- Aleh Charnyawski (born 1970), Belarusian footballer
- Aleh Hulak (1967–2022), Belarusian human rights activist
- Aleh Kavalyow (born 1987), Belarusian footballer
- Aleh Loban (born 1985), Belarusian weightlifter
- Aleh Lukashevich (born 1972), Belarusian journalist, television presenter, director and photographer
- Aleh Mikhalovich (born 1979), Belarusian Greco-Roman wrestler
- Aleh Patotski (born 1991), Belarusian football player
- Aleh Popel (born 1983), Belarusian footballer
- Aleh Shkabara (born 1983), Belarusian footballer
- Aleh Slautin (born 1986), Ukrainian-Belarusian football player
- Aleh Trusaŭ, Belarusian academic and politician
- Aleh Tsyvinski (born 1977), Belarusian-American economist
- Aleh Veratsila (born 1988), Belarusian footballer
- Aleh Yurenia (born 1990), Belarusian sprint canoeist

== See also ==
- Pareh Aleh, a village in Iran
