= 2022 Belarusian Super Cup =

| BATE Borisov | Shakhtyor Soligorsk |
| 1 | 0 |
- Date: 5 March 2022
- Venue: Dinamo-Yuni Stadium, Minsk
- Referee: Aleksei Kulbakov
- Attendance: 2,591

The 2022 Belarusian Super Cup was held on 5 March 2022 between the 2021 Belarusian Premier League champions Shakhtyor Soligorsk and the 2020–21 Belarusian Cup winners BATE Borisov. BATE Borisov won the match 1–0 and won the trophy for the eighth time. The win was a reversal of fortunes for BATE Borisov who had been defeated by Shakhtyor Soligorsk in the 2021 edition of the competition.

== Match details ==
5 March 2022
15:00 UTC+3

| BATE Borisov | 1–0 | Shakhtyor Soligorsk |
|---|---|---|
| Milić 90+2' | Report |

Dinamo-Yuni Stadium, Minsk
Attendance: 2,591
Referee: Aleksei Kulbakov (Gomel)

BATE:
| GK | 35 | (Belarus) Andrey Kudravets | (yellow card) 90+5' |
| DF | 4 | (Serbia) Aleksandar Filipović |
| DF | 17 | (Belarus) Danila Nechayev |
| DF | 32 | (Croatia) Jakov Filipović |
| DF | 44 | (Belarus) Vladislav Malkevich | | (substituted off) 80' |
| MF | 8 | (Belarus) Stanislaw Drahun (c) | | (substituted off) 73' |
| MF | 15 | (Belarus) Valeriy Bocherov | (yellow card) 87' |
| MF | 18 | (Iceland) Willum Þór Willumsson |
| MF | 19 | (Belarus) Dmitry Bessmertny |
| MF | 21 | (Belarus) Maksim Bardachow |
| FW | 26 | (Serbia) Nemanja Milić |
Substitutes:
| GK | 33 | (Belarus) Uladzislaw Ihnatsyew |
| GK | 51 | (Belarus) Vyacheslav Dergachev |
| MF | 6 | (Guinea) Yamoussa Camara |
| FW | 9 | (Belarus) Ilya Vasilevich |
| MF | 14 | (Belarus) Sergey Sazonchik |
| MF | 22 | (Belarus) Aleksey Nosko |
| MF | 23 | (Belarus) Valery Gromyko | | (substituted on) 73' |
| FW | 77 | (Nigeria) Idris Nuradeen |
| MF | 89 | (Belarus) Aleksandr Frantsuzov |
| MF | 90 | (Belarus) Arseniy Blotskiy |
| DF | 92 | (Belarus) Maksim Valadzko |
| FW | 99 | (Belarus) Artem Shumanskiy | | (substituted on) 80' |
Manager:
(Belarus) Aleksandr Mikhaylov

SHAKHTYOR:
| GK | 49 | (Belarus) Maksim Plotnikov |
| DF | 4 | (Belarus) Ruslan Khadarkevich |
| DF | 6 | (Belarus) Syarhey Palitsevich (c) |
| DF | 15 | (Bosnia and Herzegovina) Miloš Šatara | (substituted off) 68' |
| DF | 90 | (Belarus) Denis Gruzhevskiy |
| MF | 8 | (Serbia) Aleksa Pejić |
| MF | 10 | (Albania) Valon Ahmedi | (substituted off) 80' |
| MF | 19 | (Belarus) Dzmitry Padstrelaw |
| MF | 28 | (Belarus) Pavel Zabelin | (substituted off) 66' |
| FW | 13 | (Belarus) Andrey Solovey |
| FW | 88 | (The Gambia) Dembo Darboe | (substituted off) 80' |
Substitutes:
| GK | 25 | (Belarus) Raman Stsyapanaw |
| MF | 7 | (Serbia) Igor Ivanović | (substituted on) 80' |
| FW | 9 | (Belarus) Maksim Skavysh | (substituted on) 80' |
| FW | 11 | (Slovenia) Dario Kolobarić |
| DF | 17 | (Belarus) Viktar Sotnikaw |
| DF | 21 | (Belarus) Yegor Filipenko | (substituted on) 68' |
| FW | 23 | (Belarus) Denis Kozlovskiy |
| FW | 77 | (Belarus) Ilya Chernyak |
| FW | 92 | (Belarus) Yegor Karpitskiy |
| DF | 97 | (Belarus) Ilya Sviridenko |
| DF | 99 | (Belarus) Gleb Shevchenko | (substituted on) 66' |
Manager:
(Belarus) Ivan Bionchik

== See also ==
- 2021 Belarusian Premier League
- 2020–21 Belarusian Cup
