= Halak =

Halak, Khalak, Al-Halak or Khulak may refer to:

== Villages in Iran ==
- Halak Dar Khadarham
- Darvish Khalak
- Khulak
- Siah Khulak

== People ==
- Jaroslav Halák (born 1985), Slovak professional ice hockey goaltender
- Muhanad Al-Halak (born 1989), German-Iraqi politician

== See also ==
- Hulak
- Khalaf (disambiguation)
