= Artyom Sokol =

Artyom Sokol may refer to:

- Artyom Sokol (Russian footballer) (born 1997)
- Artyom Sokol (Belarusian footballer) (born 1994)
