= Doron Almog =

Chairman of the Jewish Agency

- דורון אלמוג
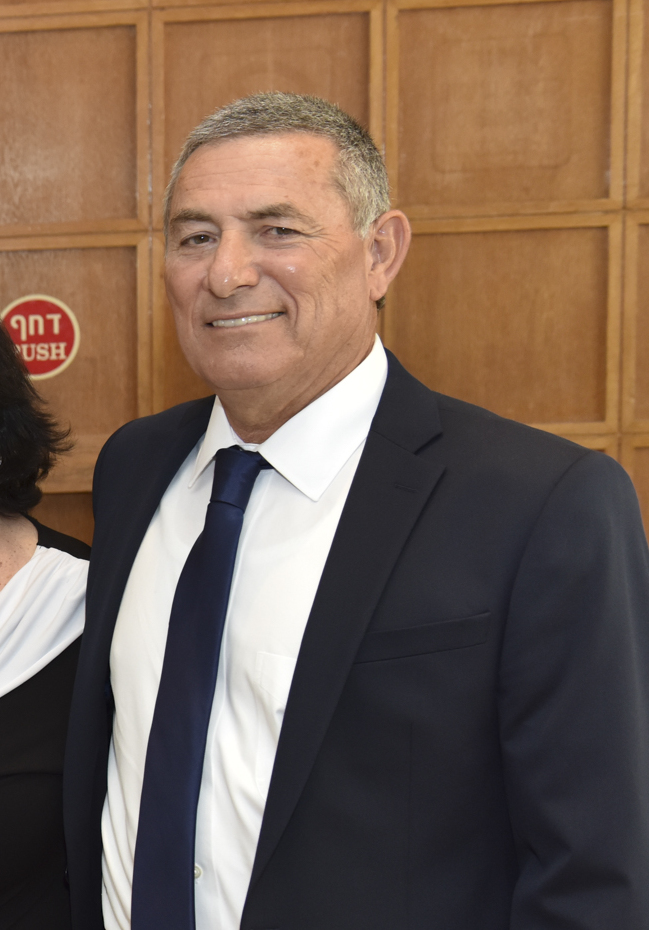
- Born: 18 May 1951 (age 75); Rishon LeZion, Israel
- Military career
- Allegiance: Israel
- Branch: Southern Command
- Service years: 1969–2003
- Rank: Aluf
- Commands: Shaldag Unit, Paratroopers Brigade, Infantry Corps, Gaza Division
- Conflicts: War of Attrition, Yom Kippur War, Operation Entebbe, First Lebanon War, Operation Moses

Doron Almog (Hebrew: דורון אלמוג; born 1951 as Doron Avrotzky) is a former major general in the Israel Defense Forces reserves. In 2016, he received the Israel Prize for his lifetime of achievement. He was appointed Chairman of the Jewish Agency for Israel in July 2022.

== Biography ==
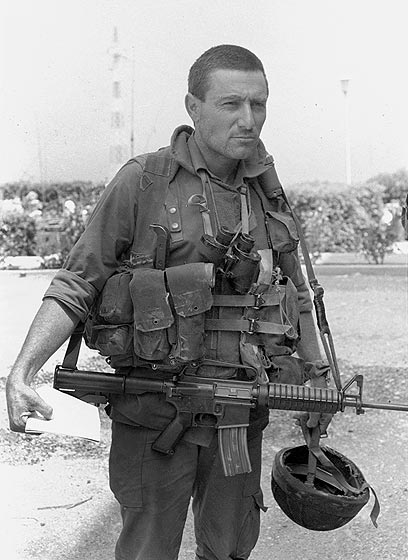
Almog during the 1982 Lebanon War

Doron Almog was born in Rishon LeZion, the eldest of four children. He attended the Hebrew Reali School in Haifa, and attended military boarding school while in high school. In 1973, his brother Eran, a soldier in the IDF Armored Corps, was killed in action during the Yom Kippur War.

Almog married Didi Frida in 1978, and they had three children: Nitzan, Eran, and Shoham. His son Eran, who was named after his brother, was born with brain damage, and suffered from severe autism and intellectual disability. He died at age 23 on February 6, 2007. His daughter Shoham was born with a severe injury to an artery in her heart, and died a month after her birth in 1991.

Almog founded Aleh Negev, a village for the disabled which provides residential, medical and social services to the handicapped of southern Israel. After Eran's death, Aleh Negev's name was changed to Nachalat Eran.

Five members of the Almog family from Haifa - Ze'ev Almog, 71, his wife Ruth, 70, their son Moshe, 43, and grandsons Tomer Almog, 9, and Assaf Staier, 11 - were killed in the suicide bombing of Maxim restaurant in Haifa on October 4, 2003, while Oran Almog, 10, was grievously injured and blinded.

Almog lives in Ness Ziona.

== Military career ==
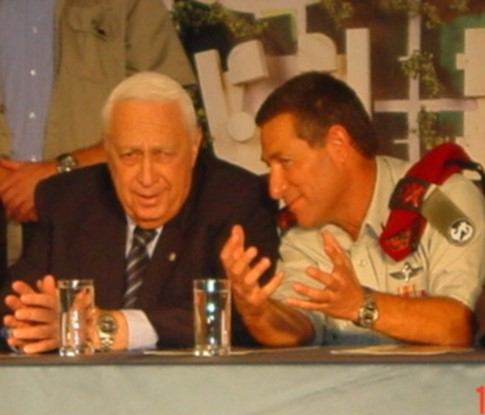
Almog (right), then head of the IDF Southern Command, with Prime Minister Ariel Sharon.

Almog was drafted into the IDF in 1969. He volunteered as a paratrooper in the Paratroopers Brigade, and fought as a soldier and as a squad leader during the War of Attrition. His first action was Operation Rhodes. In 1971 he became an infantry officer after completing Officer Candidate School. In February 1973, he participated in Operation Hood 54-55, an Israeli raid into Lebanon to destroy Fatah targets. Almog fought in the Yom Kippur War as a company commander at the 202 paratroop battalion on the Sinai front. Later on he commanded the 35th Paratroopers Brigade's Reconnaissance company. Almog led a force of officers and soldiers from the company in Operation Entebbe, and was the first soldier to land on the runway at Entebbe, marking and securing it for incoming Israeli airplanes, then leading the capture of the airfield's control tower in the rescue operation. In the 1982 Lebanon War he led the 35th paratroopers Brigade's reconnaissance battalion during heavy fighting against PLO operatives and the Syrian Army.

In 1984–1985 he commanded Shaldag Unit in the clandestine airlift of 7,000 endangered Beta Israel (or "Falasha") Jews from Ethiopia to Israel in what was known as "Operation Moses" and in special operations in Lebanon. Later on he commanded the 35th paratroopers Brigade in counter-guerrilla operations in the South Lebanon conflict. In his most recent post, as head of the IDF Southern Command from 2000 to 2003 he secured the border of the Gaza Strip against infiltration by Palestinian militants.

== Controversy ==
On September 10, 2005, as Almog and his wife arrived in London on an El Al flight to do fundraising for Aleh, a handicapped services organization which he helped found, Almog was informed by the Israeli Embassy that a warrant had been issued for his arrest on suspicion of violating the 1949 Geneva Convention in connection with home destructions in Gaza. The warrant was issued by Chief London Magistrate Timothy Workman of the Bow Street Magistrates' Court. The petition had been filed by Daniel Machover and Kate Maynard, attorneys for the Palestinian Centre for Human Rights.

Metropolitan Police counter-terrorism officers were stationed at the immigration desk. Almog was to be arrested when he presented himself but the Israeli military attache advised him to stay on the plane and return to Israel. Almog and his wife remained on the plane for two hours before it took off for Ben Gurion Airport.

It later emerged that the senior counter-terrorism officer in charge of the operation had feared for public safety and the diplomatic impact of confronting El Al sky marshals and Almog's bodyguards. A second concern was the legal implications of boarding the plane after El Al had refused police entry.

British Foreign Secretary Jack Straw apologized to his Israeli counterpart over the incident and said that the warrant has been withdrawn. The Guardian reported that the UK government was "examining stopping private individuals applying to magistrates for prosecutions over war crimes..." A review by Independent Police Complaints Commission was unable to identify the source of the leak.

In 2009, Almog was among the Israeli officials investigated by the National Court, a special and exceptional court in Spain, over the 2002 assassination of Hamas official Salah Shehade. The investigation was dropped on grounds that the attack had already been investigated by Israel.

== Post-retirement ==
Almog was given the responsibility for carrying out the Bill on the Arrangement of Bedouin Settlement in the Negev, which also led to 2013 Israeli protests.

== Israel Prize ==
Almog was awarded the Israel Prize for lifetime achievement in 2016. The Israel Prize is awarded by the State of Israel and is generally regarded as the state's highest honor. It is presented annually, on Israeli Independence Day, in a state ceremony in Jerusalem, in the presence of the President, the Prime Minister, the Speaker of the Knesset (Israel's legislature), and the Supreme Court President. When Almog accepted his prize, members of the audience rose to their feet to applaud him. Almog spoke of his work as founder of a rehabilitation village for disabled children, named in honor of his son, Eran, who died in 2007. He noted, ""in Eran's name and the name of his friends who didn't know what independence is, I ask that this ceremony be the beginning of a journey for tikkun olam (repairing the world), making Israeli society a more patient, more inclusive society. A small step towards a model society."

== The Jewish Agency ==
On July 10, 2022, Almog was appointed to lead the Jewish Agency for Israel as its chairman by the organisation's board of governors, filling a year-long vacancy left by the organisation's previous chair Isaac Herzog, who left the position in order to become President of Israel.

== Recognition ==
In 2006 Almog was honored as one of the torchbearers in the national Israeli Independence Day ceremony.
