= Daniil Miroshnikov =

Belarusian footballer

Personal information
- Date of birth: 1 November 2000 (age 26)
- Place of birth: Brest, Belarus
- Position: Centre-back

Youth career
- 2010–2018: Dinamo Brest
- 2015–2017: → RGUOR Minsk

Senior career*
Years	Team	Apps	(Gls)
2018–2020	Dinamo Brest	0	(0)
2019	→ Rukh Brest (loan)	1	(0)
2019–2020	→ Energetik-BGU Minsk (loan)	24	(1)
2021	Rukh Brest	0	(0)
2021	→ Energetik-BGU Minsk (loan)	26	(1)
2022–2023	Gomel	9	(0)
2022	→ Dinamo Brest (loan)	11	(0)

International career^{‡}
2016–2017	Belarus U17	6	(0)
2017–2018	Belarus U19	3	(0)
2020–2022	Belarus U21	10	(0)
- * Club domestic league appearances and goals as of 31 December 2023 ‡ National team caps and goals as of 8 June 2022

Daniil Miroshnikov (Belarusian: Данііл Мірошнікаў; Russian: Даниил Мирошников; born 1 November 2000) is a Belarusian professional footballer.

== Club career ==
From Brest, Miroshnikov joined Dynamo Brest in 2010, and was first involved with the first-team in 2018. After missing most of the season with injury, Miroshnikov was included in the match-day squad for the final two matches of the 2018 season. He was sent out on a six-month loan to First League side Rukh Brest ahead of the 2019 season. He made just one substitute appearance in the league and one start in the cup before the expiry of his loan. On 30 July, Miroshnikov was sent on loan to Premier League side Energetik-BGU Minsk until the end of the season. His top-flight debut came on 24 August, a 6–2 defeat away to parent club Dynamo Brest.

Miroshnikov was returned to Dynamo at the end of the season, but was loaned out again to Energetik-BGU ahead of the 2020 season. He scored his first senior goal in his first appearance of the season, the only goal in a win over former side Rukh Brest on 27 March. Miroshnikov began the season in a competition Aleksandr Svirepa for the final spot in a back three, alongside Artyom Sokol and Artem Shkurdyuk.

== International career ==
Miroshnikov was first involved in the international set-up for Belarus at under-17 level, starting all six matches at centre-back during qualification for the European Under-17 Championship in 2017. With the under-19 team, Miroshnikov started all three matches of qualification for the European Under-19 Championship, but didn't play in qualification for the same tournament the next year.

== Honours ==
Gomel

- Belarusian Cup winner: 2021–22
