= Kaplenko =

Kaplenko (Belarusian: Капленка, Russian: Капленко, Ukrainian: Капленко) is a surname of Ukrainian origin. Notable people with this surname include:

- Kirill Kaplenko (born 1999), Belarusian footballer
- Nikita Kaplenko (born 1995), Belarusian footballer
