= Tsarenko =

Tsarenko is a Ukrainian surname.

Notable people with the surname include:

- Aleksandr Tsarenko (born 1967), Russian football manager and former player
- Anton Tsarenko (born 2004), Ukrainian footballer
- Kyrylo Tsarenko (born 2000), Ukrainian cyclist
- Maria Tsarenko (born 1976), Azerbaijani volleyball player
- Nikita Tsarenko (born 2002), Belarusian footballer
