= Mukhtar Sanusi =

Nigerian footballer (born 2002)

Personal information
- Full name: Mukhtar Abayomi Sanusi
- Date of birth: 28 April 2002 (age 24)
- Place of birth: Abeokuta, Nigeria
- Position: Forward

Senior career*
Years	Team	Apps	(Gls)
2019–2020	Joy Cometh FC		
2020	Galadima		
2021–2022	Dinamo Brest	20	(1)
- * Club domestic league appearances and goals as of 31 May 2022

Mukhtar Abayomi Sanusi (born 28 April 2002) is a Nigerian professional footballer.
