= Adi Negev =

Rehabilitation facility in southern Israel

Adi Negev: עדי נגב (Hebrew)
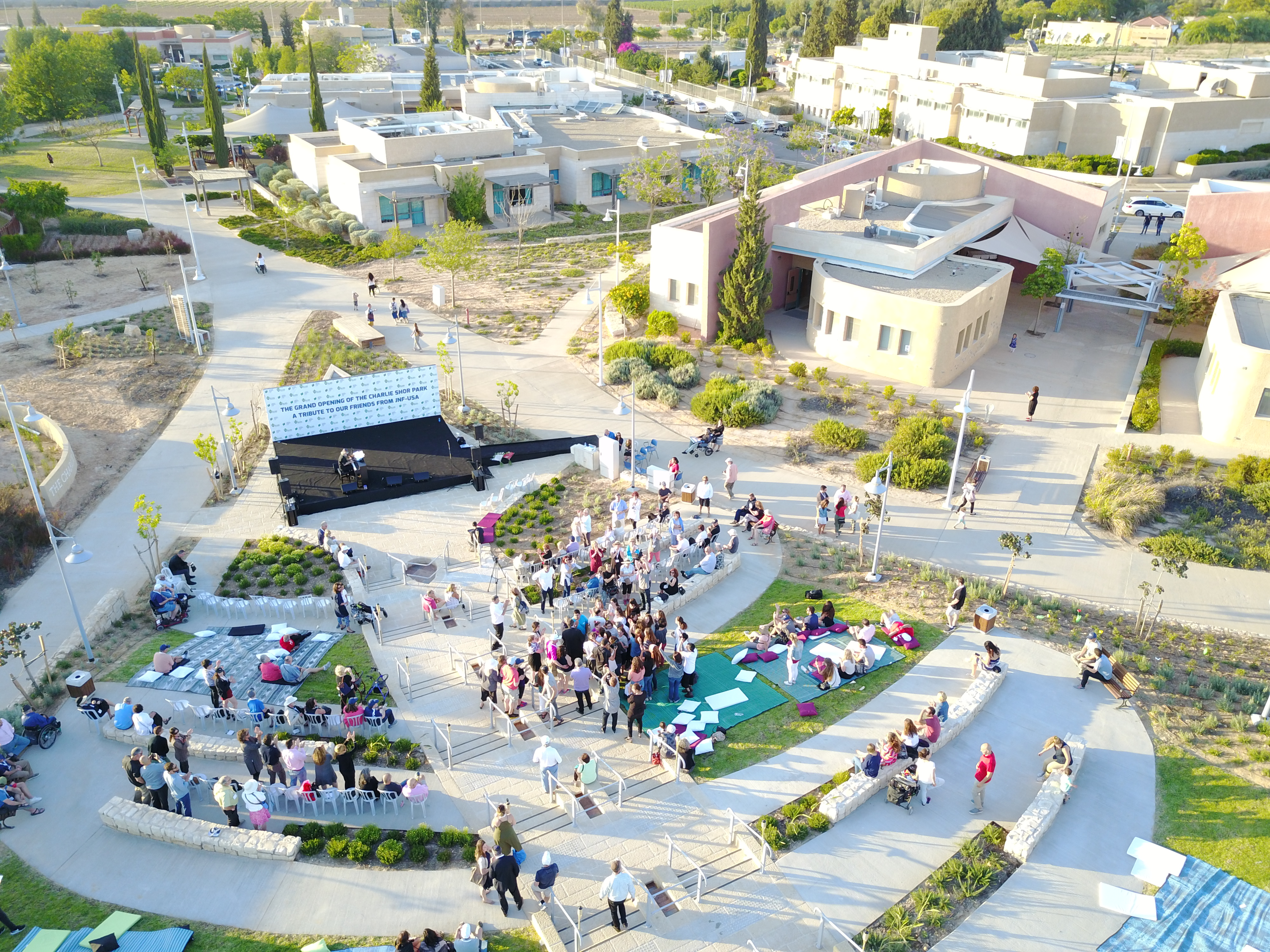

- Location within Northwest Negev region of Israel Location within Israel
- Coordinates: 31°18′51″N 34°35′41″E
- Country: Israel
- District: Southern
- Subdistrict: Beersheba
- Council: Merhavim
- Founded: 2003
- Founder: ALEH
- Website: adi-il.org

Adi Negev (Hebrew: עדי נגב), formerly named Aleh Negev, is a rehabilitation village for disabled children and adults in southern Israel. Located near Ofakim and covering 40 acres (16 ha), it falls under the jurisdiction of Merhavim Regional Council.

== History ==
The 40-acre village is a multifaceted facility designed specifically for people over the age of 21 who are physically or mentally impaired, and for children seeking care in Southern Israel.

Adi Negev is home to around 150 residents and provides services to 12,000 outpatients. The village provides residential, educational, medical and employment services, and opportunities for social interaction. It was founded by the Aleh organization in 2005. The village is also called Nahalat Eran after Eran Almog, the severely autistic son of Major General Doron Almog. Eran Almog lived in the village until his death from Castleman's disease.

The village was built by the Aleh organization, which was founded by Doron Almog. The ground was broken was commenced by Prime Minister Ariel Sharon on 12 June 2003.

In 2020, the decision was made for Aleh Jerusalem and Aleh Negev to continue in a new network under the name Adi, meaning 'jewel' in Hebrew, and the rehabilitation village was renamed to Adi Negev.

In 2022, the village opened The Harvey and Gloria Kaylie Rehabilitation Medical Center, a rehabilitation hospital.
