= Heritage of Belarus =

UNESCO project in Belarus

The Heritage of Belarus project began to be implemented in 2004, when the authors Aliaksandr Aliakseyeu and Aleh Lukashevich presented it at the headquarters of UNESCO in Paris (France). Opening the exhibition by the Director-General of UNESCO,Koïchiro Matsuura. The project includes: the creation of art book-albums, documentaries and photo exhibitions about the historical and cultural heritage of Belarus.

Belarus Today:

Without doubt, the Heritage of Belarus art project is among the most significant in its field, promoting understanding of our historical and cultural legacy. Alexander Alexeev and Oleg Lukashevich have created their own concept for presenting Belarusian history and culture, uniting the release of artistic albums, TV films and photo exhibitions, to achieve a single goal: the promotion of Belarus’ national wealth. Mr. Alexeev and Mr. Lukashevich have used new methods and means of expression, aiming to create a new perspective on our picturesque and unique panorama, its wonderful landscapes and architectural sites. It presents interesting pages from our nation’s history, contributing to an extensive and active cultural dialogue and opening up Belarusian heritage to the global community.

On October 25, 2004 in Vatican, the authors gave the Pope John Paul II the album “Heritage of Belarus” as a present. In 2012 finished the work under the creation of the series of documentary films of the art project “Heritage of Belarus” about outstanding natives of Belarus, who have made significant contributions to the development of the world community. They created the 11 documentary films including Epoch of Marc Chagall, Euphrosyne of Polotsk, Louis Mayer, Lion of Hollywood, Stanisław August Poniatowski, Tadeusz Kosciuszko, Return of the Hero, Epoch of Adam Mickiewicz, Ignacy Domeyko, Nikolai Sudzilovsky, Epoch, The Famous Unknown Ivan Khrutsky, Epoch of Maksim Bahdanovič, and Epoch of Napoleon Orda.

On 5 October 2018 the photoexhibition by Aliaksandr Aliakseyeu and Aleh Lukashevich "Heritage of Belarus" opened in the Independence Palace, Minsk. Now there is a permanent exhibition of these authors in the Ceremonial Hall of the Palace of Independence.

== Recognition and awards ==
- In 2010, 2020 The art project of Aliaksandr Aliakseyeu and Aleh Lukashevich “Heritage of Belarus” was nominated for the State Prize of the Republic of Belarus.

== Books-albums ==
Belarusian Telegraph Agency:

When the Belarusian Heritage photo albums hit the book shelves they became bestsellers among similar products. In 2004-2014 some 42,500 albums were sold, which is a record number for the Belarusian book publishing industry.

- 2004 - "Heritage of Belarus" 1st edition (circulation 3000 copies) ISBN 978-985-454-231-7
- 2005 - "Heritage of Belarus" 2nd and 3rd edition (total circulation 6000 copies) ISBN 978-985-454-288-1
- 2006 - "Heritage of Belarus" 1st edition (circulation 3000 copies) ISBN 978-985-454-301-7
- 2006 - "Heritage of Belarus" 4th edition (circulation 3000 copies) ISBN 978-985-454-302-4
- 2007 - "Heritage of Belarus.Treasures" (circulation 3000 copies) ISBN 978-985-454-388-8
- 2007 - "Heritage of Belarus" 5th and 6th edition. Circulation 8000 copies. ISBN 978-985-454-354-3
- 2007 - "Heritage of Belarus" 2nd edition (circulation 3500 copies) ISBN 978-985-454-338-2
- 2009 - "Heritage of Belarus" 1st edition (circulation 3000 copies) ISBN 978-985-90180-2-2
- 2009 - "Heritage of Belarus" 3rd edition (circulation 3000 copies) ISBN 978-985-454-483-0
- 2010 - "Heritage of Belarus" 4th edition (circulation 5000 copies) ISBN 978-985-454-566-0
- 2013 - "Heritage of Belarus" 2nd edition (circulation 1000 copies) ISBN 978-985-7058-20-4
- 2013 - "Treasures of Belarus" 1st edition (circulation 1000 copies) ISBN 978-985-7058-46-4
- 2014 - "Treasures of Belarus" 2nd edition (circulation 1000 copies), (3rd edition 1000 copies) ISBN 978-985-7103-09-6
- 2015 - "Heritage of Belarus" 1st edition (circulation 1000 copies) ISBN 978-985-90353-3-3
- 2017 - "Heritage of Belarus" 2nd edition (circulation 1000 copies) ISBN 978-985-90353-7-1
- 2021 - "Heritage of Belarus" 1st edition (exclusive edition of 500 copies) ISBN 978-985-90433-3-8
- 2025 - “Heritage of Belarus” 1st edition in five languages (exclusive edition of 300 copies) ISBN 978-985-90433-4-5 (exclusive edition of 200 copies) ISBN 978-985-90486-3-0

The total circulation for 2021 is 47 500 thousand copies.
