= Kiryl Shawchenka =

Belarusian professional footballer

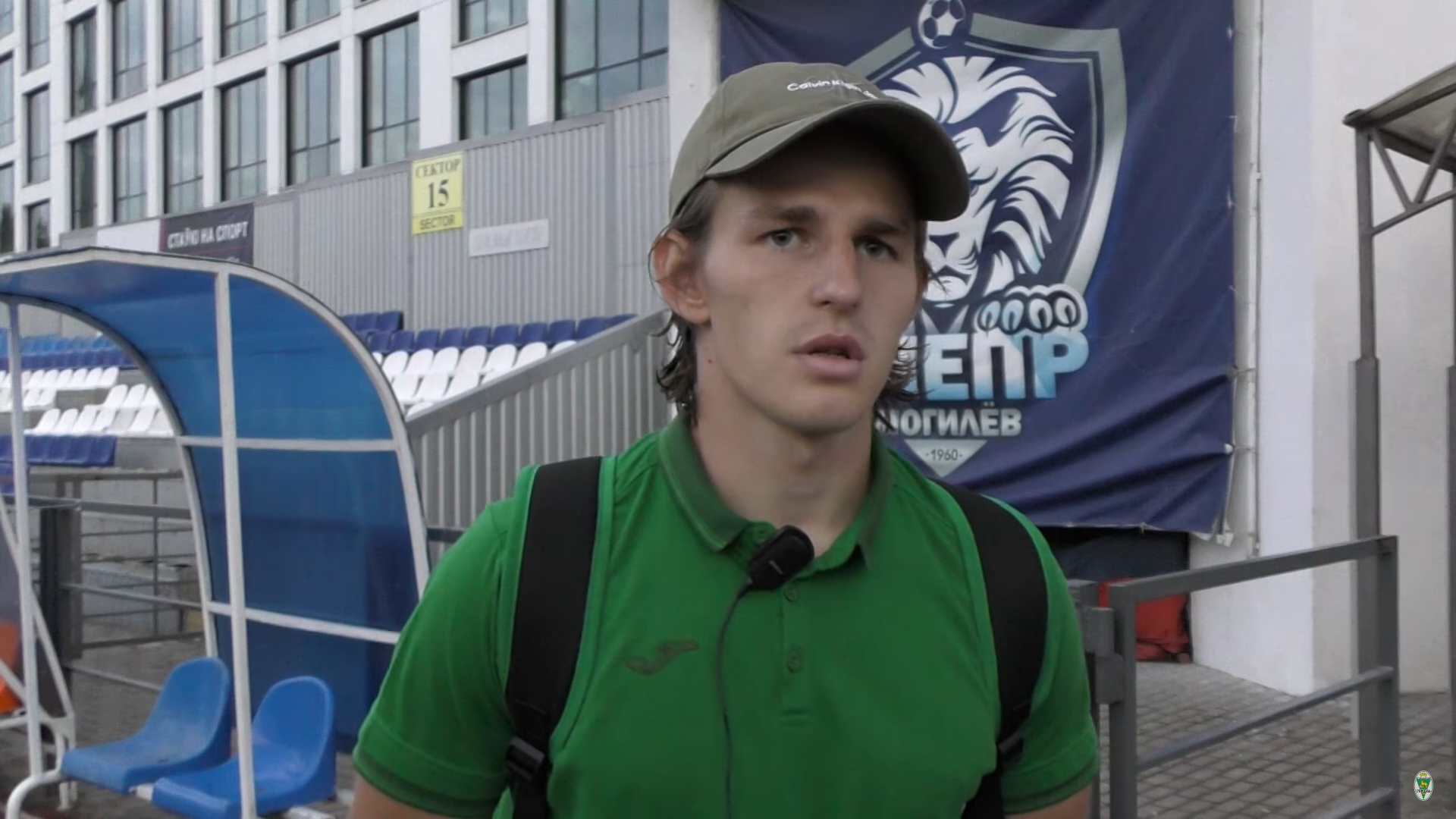
- 2022

Personal information
- Date of birth: 26 February 2002 (age 24)
- Place of birth: Dobrush, Gomel Oblast, Belarus
- Height: 1.78 m (5 ft 10 in)
- Position: Defender

Youth career
- 2018–2020: Gomel

Senior career*
Years	Team	Apps	(Gls)
2019–2025	Gomel	35	(0)
- * Club domestic league appearances and goals as of 3 April 2026

Kiryl Shawchenka (Belarusian: Кірыл Шаўчэнка; Russian: Кирилл Шевченко; born 26 February 2002) is a Belarusian professional footballer who last played for Gomel.

== Honours ==
Gomel

- Belarusian Cup winner: 2021–22
