= Denis Sadovsky =

Belarusian footballer

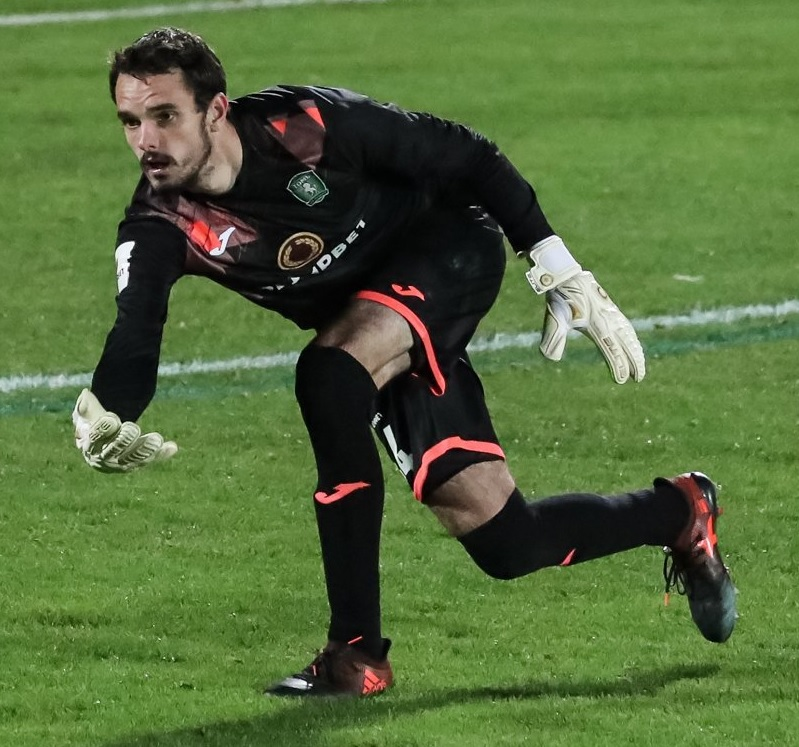
- Sadovsky with Tom Tomsk in 2021

Personal information
- Full name: Denis Yuryevich Sadovsky
- Date of birth: 11 August 1997 (age 29)
- Place of birth: Vitebsk, Belarus
- Height: 1.90 m (6 ft 3 in)
- Position: Goalkeeper

Team information
- Current team: Naftan Novopolotsk
- Number: 16

Youth career
- 2015–2017: Shakhtyor Soligorsk

Senior career*
Years	Team	Apps	(Gls)
2017–2018	Shakhtyor Soligorsk	0	(0)
2018	→ Orsha (loan)	13	(0)
2019–2021	Energetik-BGU Minsk	18	(0)
2021	Tom Tomsk	8	(0)
2022	Gomel	21	(0)
2023	Dinamo Brest	5	(0)
2023	Slavia Mozyr	0	(0)
2024	Slutsk	6	(0)
2024	Dnepr Mogilev	6	(0)
2025	Molodechno	6	(0)
2025–2026	Bumprom Gomel	15	(0)
2026–	Naftan Novopolotsk	1	(0)
- * Club domestic league appearances and goals as of 6 September 2026

Denis Yur'yevich Sadovsky (Belarusian: Дзяніс Юр'евіч Садоўскі; Russian: Денис Юрьевич Садовский; born 11 August 1997) is a Belarusian professional footballer who plays for Naftan Novopolotsk.

== Club career ==
On 20 January 2022, he returned to Belarus and signed a two-year contract with Gomel.

== Honours ==
Shakhtyor Soligorsk

- Belarusian Cup winner: 2018–19

Gomel

- Belarusian Cup winner: 2021–22
