= Pavel Tseslyukevich =

Belarusian footballer

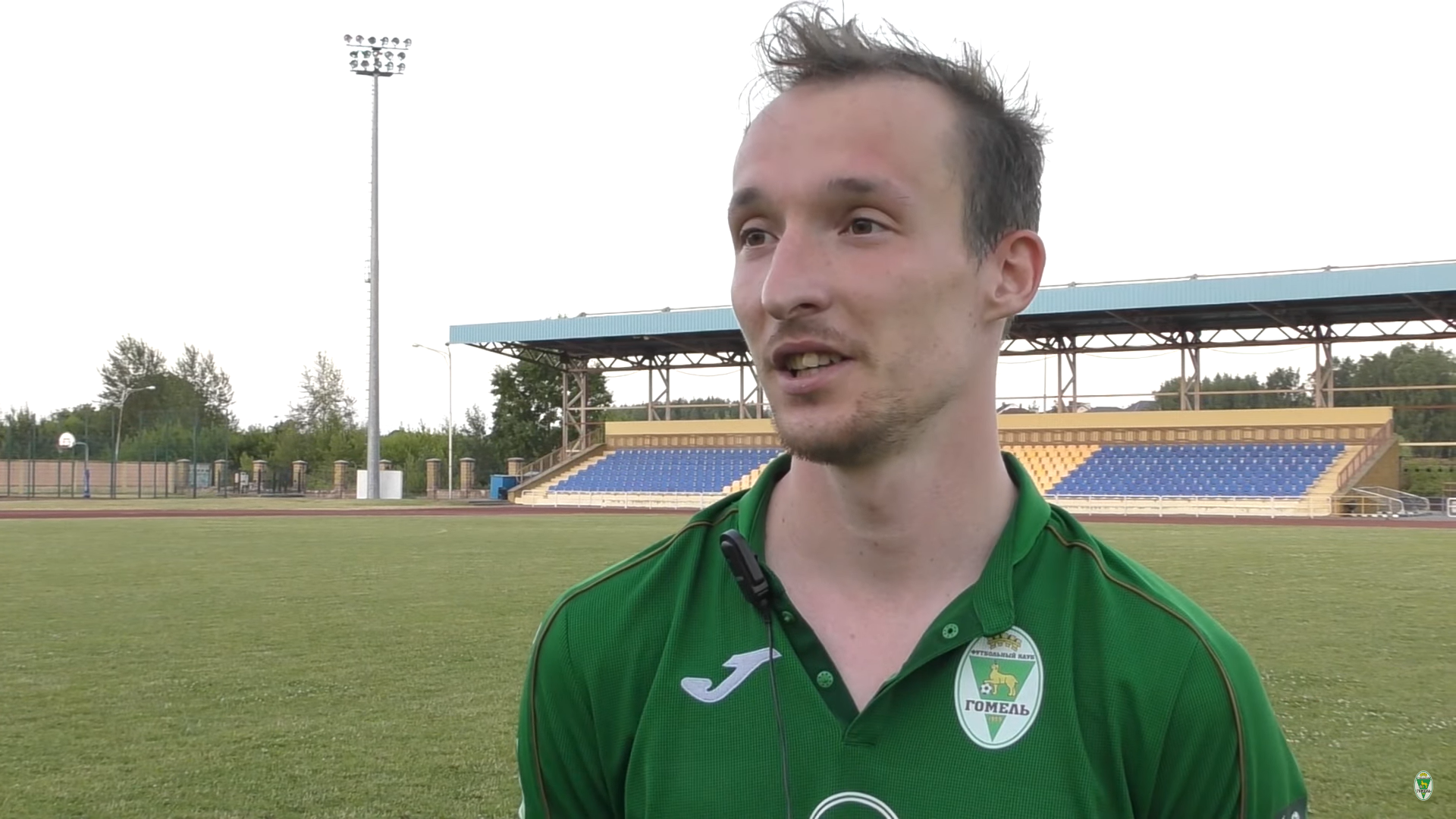

Personal information
- Date of birth: 11 May 1995 (age 31)
- Place of birth: Grodno, Belarus
- Height: 1.75 m (5 ft 9 in)
- Position: Midfielder

Team information
- Current team: Slutsk
- Number: 10

Youth career
- 2012–2015: Neman Grodno

Senior career*
Years	Team	Apps	(Gls)
2014–2020	Neman Grodno	31	(2)
2016	→ Baranovichi (loan)	24	(3)
2017	→ Granit Mikashevichi (loan)	30	(4)
2020–2021	Gomel	20	(7)
2021–2023	Dnepr Mogilev	68	(7)
2024–2025	Molodechno	38	(4)
2025	Bumprom Gomel	15	(0)
2026–	Slutsk	9	(0)
- * Club domestic league appearances and goals as of 6 July 2026

Pavel Tseslyukevich (Belarusian: Павел Цеслюкевіч; Russian: Павел Цеслюкевич; born 11 May 1995) is a Belarusian professional footballer who plays for Slutsk.

== Honours ==
Gomel

- Belarusian Cup winner: 2021–22
