= Valery Bocherov =

Belarusian footballer (born 2000)

Personal information
- Full name: Valery Yuryevich Bocherov
- Date of birth: 10 August 2000 (age 26)
- Place of birth: Minsk, Belarus
- Height: 1.78 m (5 ft 10 in)
- Position: Midfielder

Team information
- Current team: ML Vitebsk
- Number: 15

Youth career
- 2013–2020: BATE Borisov

Senior career*
| Years | Team | Apps | (Gls) |
| 2020–2023 | BATE Borisov | 54 | (3) |
| 2020 | → Smolevichi (loan) | 7 | (0) |
| 2021 | → Slutsk (loan) | 24 | (1) |
| 2024–2025 | Ural Yekaterinburg | 4 | (0) |
| 2024–2025 | → Ufa (loan) | 21 | (1) |
| 2026– | ML Vitebsk | 6 | (1) |

International career^{‡}
| 2021–2022 | Belarus U21 | 8 | (0) |
| 2022– | Belarus | 21 | (1) |
- * Club domestic league appearances and goals as of 4 July 2026 ‡ National team caps and goals as of 10 June 2025

Valery Yuryevich Bocherov (Belarusian: Валерый Юр'евіч Бачароў; Russian: Валерий Юрьевич Бочеров; born 10 August 2000) is a Belarusian professional footballer who plays as a midfielder for ML Vitebsk and the Belarus national team.

== Career ==
On 12 January 2024, Bocherov joined Russian Premier League club Ural Yekaterinburg.

== Career statistics ==
As of match played 1 June 2024

Appearances and goals by club, season and competition
| Club | Season | League | | | Cup | | Europe | | Other | | Total | |
| Club | Season | Division | Apps | Goals | Apps | Goals | Apps | Goals | Apps | Goals | Apps | Goals |
|---|---|---|---|---|---|---|---|---|---|---|---|---|
| BATE Borisov | 2020 | Belarusian Premier League | 0 | 0 | 1 | 0 | 0 | 0 | 0 | 0 | 1 | 0 |
| BATE Borisov | 2021 | Belarusian Premier League | 0 | 0 | 0 | 0 | 0 | 0 | 0 | 0 | 0 | 0 |
| BATE Borisov | 2022 | Belarusian Premier League | 27 | 1 | 5 | 0 | 2 (Note: Appearances in UEFA Europa Conference League) | 0 | 1 (Note: Appearance in Belarusian Super Cup) | 0 | 35 | 1 |
| BATE Borisov | 2023 | Belarusian Premier League | 27 | 3 | 6 | 0 | 8 (Note: For appearances in UEFA Champions League, two appearances in UEFA Europa League, two appearances in UEFA Europa Conference League) | 0 | — | | 41 | 3 |
| BATE Borisov | Total | | 54 | 4 | 12 | 0 | 10 | 0 | 1 | 0 | 77 | 4 |
| Smolevichi (loan) | 2020 | Belarusian Premier League | 7 | 1 | 2 | 0 | — | | — | | 9 | 1 |
| Slutsk (loan) | 2021 | Belarusian Premier League | 24 | 1 | 2 | 0 | — | | — | | 26 | 1 |
| Ural | 2023–24 | Russian Premier League | 4 | 0 | 1 | 0 | — | | 1 (Note: Appearance in the relegation play-offs) | 0 | 6 | 0 |
| Career total | | | 89 | 6 | 17 | 0 | 10 | 0 | 2 | 0 | 118 | 6 |

== International goals ==
| No. | Date | Venue | Opponent | Score | Result | Competition |
|---|---|---|---|---|---|---|
| 1. | 5 June 2025 | Borisov Arena, Barysaw, Belarus | Kazakhstan | 3–0 | 4–1 | Friendly |

== Honours ==
BATE Borisov

- Belarusian Cup winner: 2020–21
- Belarusian Super Cup winner: 2022
