= Aleh Lukashevich =

Belarusian journalist (born 1972)

- Belarusian: Алег Вацлававіч Лукашэвіч
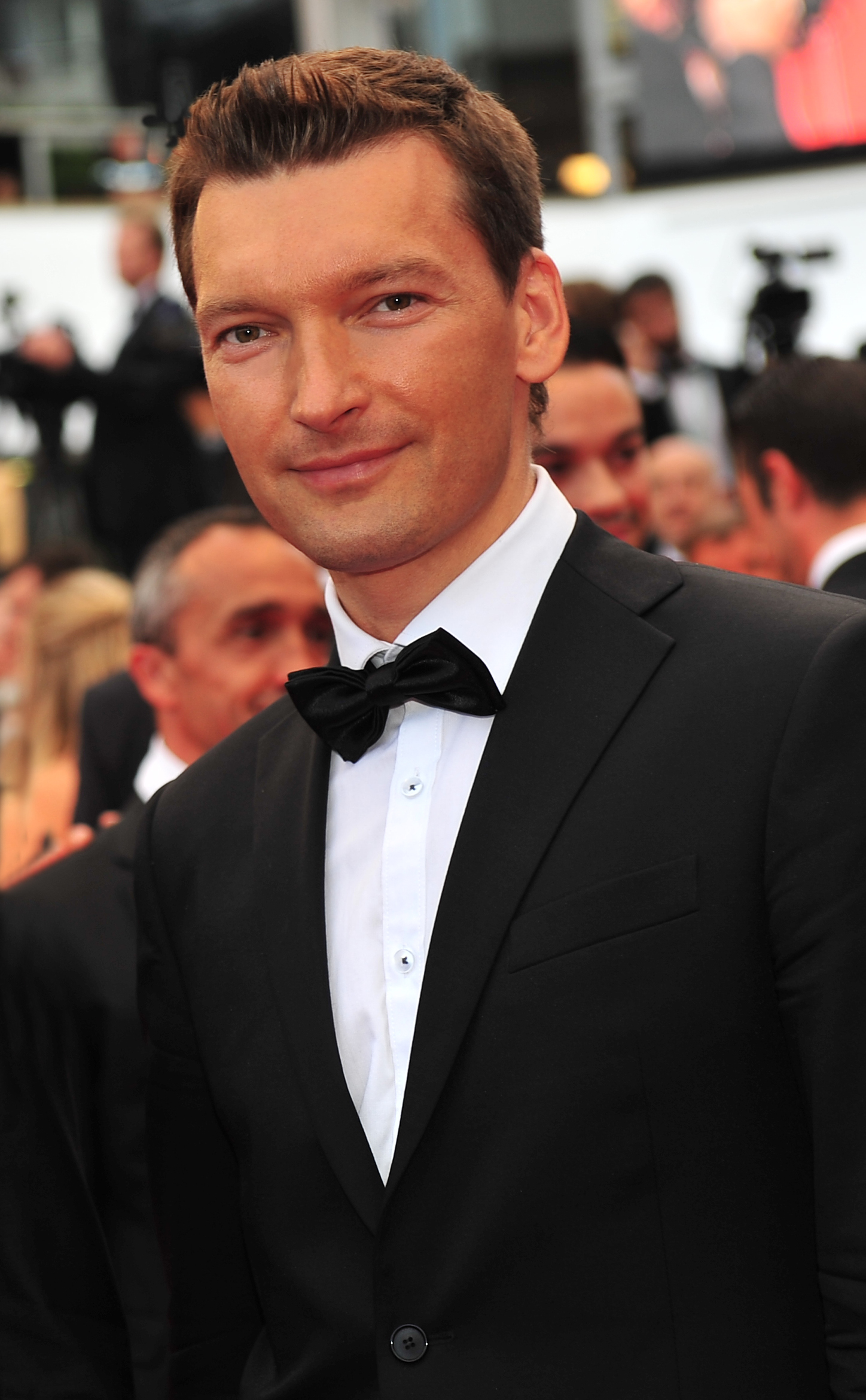
- Born: Aleh Lukashevich; March 27, 1972 (age 54); Belarus
- Citizenship: Belarus
- Education: Belarusian State University
- Occupations: Journalist, director, photographer
- Television: Belarus-1
- Title: Presenter
- Term: 1994–2015
- Awards: Prize of the President of the Republic of Belarus "For Spiritual Revival”

Aleh Lukashevich (born March 27, 1972; Belarusian: Алег Вацлававіч Лукашэвіч, Russian: Олег Вацлавович Лукашевич) is a Belarusian journalist, television presenter, director and photographer.

== Early life and education ==
Aleh Lukashevich was born in the town of Lyachavičy, Belarus, on March 27, 1972.

In December 1994, he began working for National State TV and Radio Company of the Republic of Belarus. In 1995 he graduated from the Faculty of Journalism of the Belarusian State University. In 1996 he majored as a director and a TV cameraman at CIRNEA International Centre, Paris, France. He furthered his skills at the French television channels France 2, TV5 Monde, and France 3.

In 1994 Lukashevich started work at Belarusian Television, where he created a number of TV projects: “New Collection”, “Our Heritage”, “Shot!”, “Epoch”.

== Career ==
Lukashevich is the first Belarusian journalist to have been accredited at the International Film Festivals in Cannes, Venice, and Berlin.

He has interviewed many classics of world cinema, including Peter Greenaway, Wim Wenders, Paul Verhoeven, Krzysztof Zanussi, Takeshi Kitano, Catherine Breillat, Nikita Mikhalkov, Pedro Almodóvar, Ken Loach, Andrzej Wajda, Alexander Sokurov, Bertrand Tavernier, Emir Kusturica, and others. Pierre Cardin, Karl Lagerfeld, Patricia Kaas, Julia Ormond, Sharon Stone, Emmanuelle Béart, Asia Argento, Catherine Deneuve, Fanny Ardant, Andrei Voznesensky, Sonia Rykiel, Isabelle Huppert—this is just a partial list of celebrities with whom Aleh Lukashevich has met.

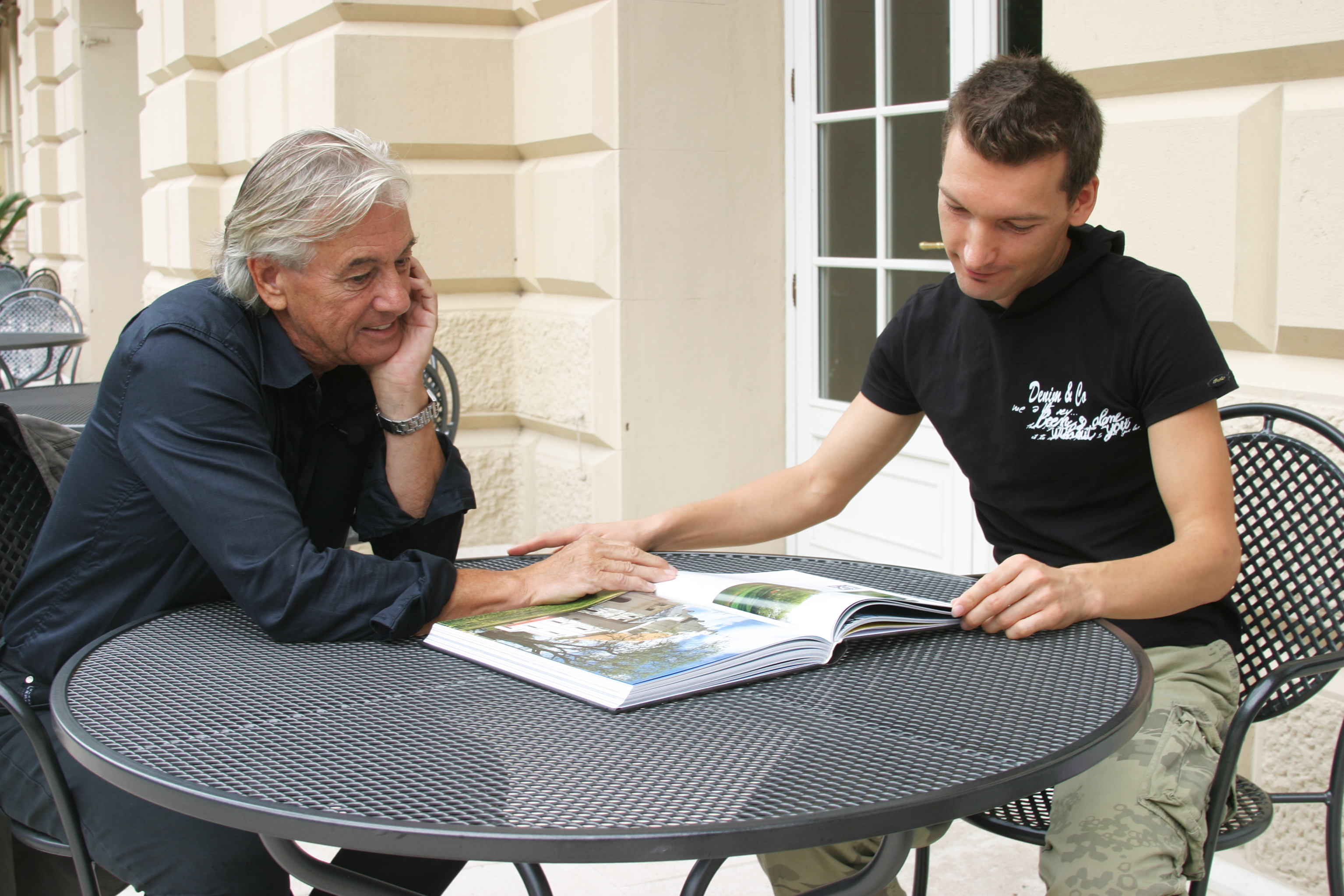
Aleh Lukashevich and Paul Verhuven at the 64th Venice Film Festival (2007)

Since 2003, together with Alexander Alekseyev, he has been implementing the art project Heritage of Belarus, which includes holding photo exhibitions, publishing albums, producing documentaries and television programs. Since November 2010, Aleh Lukashevich has been a member of the Republican Public Council for Culture and Art under the Council of Ministers of the Republic of Belarus. Together with Alexander Alekseyev, he organized the opening of the first National Pavilion of the Republic of Belarus at the 64th Cannes Film Festival. In May 2011, he became the head of the National Pavilion. In 2012, he began working on the documentary and educational project "Artists of the School of Paris. Natives of Belarus." In May 2014, the premiere of a series of nine films took place. Madonna provided the music for the project, and a contract was signed with her. In 2017, he created ten films from the series "Contemporary Art of Belarus." In January-February 2018, the project premiered on the Belarus-24 and Belarus-3 TV channels.

Belarus Today:

It’s become fashionable to investigate our past, delving into family genealogy to fill gaps in our personal history. Famous TV host Oleg Lukashevich is interested not in his own roots but in those of Belarus-born painters who worked in the Parisian School, of France. After a decade of research, he has discovered a great deal and, two years ago, joined Alexander Alexeev in preparing a new documentary series, with an episode devoted to each artist.

== Filmography ==
- Boris Zaborov: The long road back. (Belarus, 52 min.) 2010
- Belarus-Born Artists of the School of Paris. (Bèlarus, 104 min.) 2011
- Marc Chagall. The colour of love. (Belarus, 26 min.) 2014
- Chaïm Soutine. Desire for colour. (Belarus, 26 min.) 2014
- Ossip Lubitch. Contemplator of life. (Belarus, 26 min.) 2014
- Ossip Zadkine. Interweaving of light and shadows. (Belarus, 26 min.) 2014
- Léon Bakst. The master of a line. (Belarus, 26 min.) 2014
- Nadia Khodasevich Léger. Prospection. (Belarus, 26 min.) 2014
- Mikhail Kikoïne. Poetic world on canvas. (Belarus, 26 min.) 2014
- Pinchus Kremegne. Eternal life of art. (Belarus, 26 min.) 2014
- Faïbich-Schraga Zarfin. Shine of colour. (Belarus, 26 min.) 2014

Art Belarus:

When working on the project the creative team of Oleg Lukashevich and Aleksandr Alekseyev made a research in a number of archives in Belarus, Russia and France. Authors of the film cooperated with the artists’ relatives and eye-witnesses of those events. Oleg Lukashevich and Aleksandr Alekseyev met Marc Chagall’s son – David McNeill, Ossip Lubitch’s daughter – Dina Lyubich, which enabled them not only to learn new information but also to specify some facts of the artists’ biographies. Most of the documents appearing in the film will be first shown to the wide audience.

== Recognition and awards ==
- In 2001, 2003 and 2008, Jerzy Giedroyc Honorary Diplomas for publicism in the field of culture
- January 2005, prize of the President of the Republic of Belarus “For Spiritual Revival”
- November 2005, chair of the Cinema Press Jury at the 12th Minsk International Film Festival
- 2005 - Francysk Skaryna Diploma
- 2001, 2003, 2008 - Jerzy Giedroyc Honorary Diplomas for publicism in the field of culture
- November 2006, at the 9th Eurasian TV Forum in Moscow, Diploma of the Winner and the Medal of Honour for the best documentary Epoch of Marc Chagall
- Since November 2010, member of the Republican Public Council for Culture and Arts at the Council of Ministers of the Republic of Belarus
- May 2011, head of the National Pavilion of the Republic of Belarus at the 64th International Cannes Film Festival
- 2016 - Prize of the Best Book Designer. Diploma of the Winner in the nomination "Best Designer" of the book with the presentation of a commemorative sign-symbol "Golden Folio" at the 55th National Competition "The Art of the Book - 2016" in Minsk
