= Mikita Nyakrasaw =

Belarusian professional footballer

Personal information
- Date of birth: 13 October 2000 (age 26)
- Place of birth: Rechitsa, Gomel Oblast, Belarus
- Height: 1.85 m (6 ft 1 in)
- Position: Forward

Team information
- Current team: Belshina Bobruisk
- Number: 18

Youth career
- 2017–2018: RGUOR Minsk
- 2018–2019: Torpedo Minsk

Senior career*
Years	Team	Apps	(Gls)
2019	Sputnik Rechitsa	10	(1)
2020–2021	Gomel	44	(8)
2022–2023	BATE Borisov	15	(1)
2024	Naftan Novopolotsk	12	(0)
2024	Gomel	5	(0)
2025	Lokomotiv Gomel	31	(10)
2026–	Belshina Bobruisk	13	(0)

International career^{‡}
2017	Belarus U17	2	(0)
2018	Belarus U19	3	(0)
2021	Belarus U21	3	(0)
- * Club domestic league appearances and goals as of 3 July 2026 ‡ National team caps and goals as of 6 September 2021

Mikita Nyakrasaw (Belarusian: Мікіта Някрасаў; Russian: Никита Некрасов; born 13 October 2000) is a Belarusian professional footballer who plays as a forward for Belarusian Premier League club Belshina Bobruisk.

== Honours ==
Gomel

- Belarusian Cup winner: 2021–22
