= Ilya Lukashevich =

Belarusian footballer

Personal information
- Date of birth: 1 August 1998 (age 28)
- Place of birth: Minsk, Belarus
- Height: 1.75 m (5 ft 9 in)
- Position: Defender

Youth career
- 2012–2017: Minsk

Senior career*
Years	Team	Apps	(Gls)
2017–2018	Minsk	24	(0)
2019	Torpedo-BelAZ Zhodino	0	(0)
2019–2020	Proleter Novi Sad	3	(0)
2020	Shakhtyor Soligorsk	0	(0)
2020	→ Gorodeya (loan)	2	(0)
2021	Sputnik Rechitsa	9	(0)
2021–2022	Energetik-BGU Minsk	34	(0)
2023–2024	Shakhtyor Soligorsk	17	(0)

International career^{‡}
2016	Belarus U19		
2018–2019	Belarus U21	9	(0)
- * Club domestic league appearances and goals as of 6 April 2026 ‡ National team caps and goals as of 19 November 2019

Ilya Lukashevich (Belarusian: Ілья Лукашэвіч; Russian: Илья Лукашевич; born 1 August 1998) is a Belarusian professional footballer.

== Career ==
=== Club career ===
Born in capital Minsk, he was a product of the FC Minsk academy where he played since 2012. His first experience as senior was in 2015 when he was included in FC Minsk reserves squad. He then debuted for Minsk main team in the 2017 Belarusian Premier League with 2 appearances, and in the next season he became regular, finishing the year with 22 appearances. His regular games made him become consistent call at the Belarusian U21 team, and with his team Minsk finishing season 11th, he called the attention of Torpedo-BelAZ Zhodino which had finished fifth. In summer 2019 Lukashevich decided left for a Serbian top-flight side FK Proleter Novi Sad after successful trials. He debuted in the 2019–20 Serbian SuperLiga on September 14, in a home game against FK Partizan.

=== International career ===
Lukashevich has been a presence at Belarusian youth national teams ever since 2016. After passing through Belarus U19 level, it is since 2018 that his presence has been regular at Belarusian U21 squad.

By the end of September 2022, Lukashevich received a call for the Belarusian main team, however, in both games he ended as an unused substitute.

=== Honours ===
Shakhtyor Soligorsk

- Belarusian Super Cup winner: 2023
