= Hulak =

Hulak is the surname of the following people:

- Aleh Hulak (1967–2022), Belarusian activist
- Derek Hulak (born 1989), Canadian ice hockey defenseman
- Krunoslav Hulak (1951–2015), Croatian chess master
- Mykola Hulak (1821–1899), Ukrainian political and cultural activist, journalist, scientist, interpreter and lawyer
- Petro Hulak‑Artemovsky (1790–1865), Ukrainian poet, translator, and scholar
- Semen Hulak-Artemovsky (1813–1873), Ukrainian opera composer, singer, actor and dramatist
