= Georgiy Monastyrskiy =

Belarusian footballer

Georgiy Monastyrskiy Георгій Манастырскі
Personal information
- Date of birth: 12 December 1997 (age 28)
- Place of birth: Gomel, Belarus
- Height: 1.86 m (6 ft 1 in)
- Position: Defender

Team information
- Current team: Hapoel Beit She'an

Youth career
- 2013–2015: Gomel
- 2016: Maccabi Haifa

Senior career*
Years	Team	Apps	(Gls)
2016–2017	Ironi Nesher	0	(0)
2017	Belshina Bobruisk	13	(0)
2017–2019	Lokomotiv Gomel	49	(4)
2019–2021	Sputnik Rechitsa	47	(1)
2021	Tzeirei Kafr Kanna	0	(0)
2021	Hapoel Iksal	9	(0)
2021–2022	Hapoel Bnei Ar'ara 'Ara	2	(0)
2022	Hapoel Bnei Fureidis	10	(2)
2022–2023	Hapoel Migdal HaEmek	18	(1)
2023–2024	Hapoel Beit She'an	5	(0)
2025–	Ironi Ariel	14	(0)

International career
2013	Belarus U17	3	(0)
- * Club domestic league appearances and goals as of 7 February 2025

Georgiy Monastyrskiy (Belarusian: Георгій Манастырскі; Russian: Георгий Монастырский; born 12 December 1997) is a Belarusian professional footballer who plays for Hapoel Beit She'an.
