= Pavel Rassolko =

Belarusian footballer

Personal information
- Date of birth: 29 April 1993 (age 33)
- Place of birth: Minsk, Belarus
- Height: 1.83 m (6 ft 0 in)
- Position: Midfielder

Team information
- Current team: Polotsk

Youth career
- 2009–2010: BATE Borisov

Senior career*
| Years | Team | Apps | (Gls) |
| 2013–2018 | Luch Minsk | 109 | (18) |
| 2018 | → Baranovichi (loan) | 9 | (1) |
| 2019 | Volna Pinsk | 23 | (7) |
| 2020 | Krumkachy Minsk | 22 | (0) |
| 2021 | Naftan Novopolotsk | 25 | (1) |
| 2022–2023 | Molodechno | 41 | (2) |
| 2024–2025 | Orsha | 42 | (5) |
| 2026– | Polotsk | 0 | (0) |
- * Club domestic league appearances and goals as of 8 April 2026

Pavel Rassolko (Belarusian: Павел Расолька; Russian: Павел Рассолько; born 29 April 1993) is a Belarusian professional footballer who plays for Polotsk.
