= Yuri Klochkov =

Russian footballer

Personal information
- Full name: Yuri Vyacheslavovich Klochkov
- Date of birth: 3 October 1998 (age 28)
- Place of birth: Slavyansk-na-Kubani, Russia
- Height: 1.78 m (5 ft 10 in)
- Position: Midfielder

Team information
- Current team: Shurtan

Senior career*
Years	Team	Apps	(Gls)
2019–2020	Chernomorets Novorossiysk	9	(1)
2020	Kafa Feodosia	14	(6)
2021	Slutsk	17	(2)
2022–2024	Dnepr Mogilev	81	(32)
2025	Neman Grodno	21	(4)
2026–	Shurtan	0	(0)
- * Club domestic league appearances and goals as of 19 March 2026

Yuri Vyacheslavovich Klochkov (Russian: Юрий Вячеславович Клочков; born 3 October 1998) is a Russian football player who plays for Uzbekistan Pro League club Shurtan.

== Club career ==
He made his debut in the Russian Professional Football League for FC Chernomorets Novorossiysk on 16 July 2019 in a game against FC SKA Rostov-on-Don.
