= Vyacheslav Dergachyov =

Belarusian footballer

Personal information
- Full name: Vyacheslav Anatolyevich Dergachyov
- Date of birth: 1 July 2001 (age 25)
- Place of birth: Minsk, Belarus
- Height: 1.85 m (6 ft 1 in)
- Position: Goalkeeper

Youth career
- 2013–2021: BATE Borisov

Senior career*
Years	Team	Apps	(Gls)
2021–2024	BATE Borisov	12	(0)
- * Club domestic league appearances and goals as of 30 March 2024

Vyacheslav Anatolyevich Dergachyov (Belarusian: Вячаслаў Анатольевіч Дзергачоў; Russian: Вячеслав Анатольевич Дергачёв; born 1 July 2001) is a Belarusian former professional footballer.

== Honours ==
BATE Borisov

- Belarusian Cup winner: 2020–21
- Belarusian Super Cup winner: 2022
