= Ilya Vasilyev =

Russian footballer

Personal information
- Full name: Ilya Vladimirovich Vasilyev
- Date of birth: 24 April 1997 (age 29)
- Place of birth: Gorbunki, Leningrad Oblast, Russia
- Height: 1.78 m (5 ft 10 in)
- Position: Midfielder

Senior career*
Years	Team	Apps	(Gls)
2017–2018	Tosno	0	(0)
2018–2019	Dynamo Bryansk	29	(3)
2020	Vitebsk	14	(0)
2021–2022	Belshina Bobruisk	47	(18)
Total		90	(21)
- * Club domestic league appearances and goals as of 31 December 2022

Ilya Vladimirovich Vasilyev (Russian: Илья Владимирович Васильев; born 24 April 1997) is a Russian former football player.

== Club career ==
He made his debut in the Russian Professional Football League for FC Dynamo Bryansk on 26 July 2018 in a game against FC Kvant Obninsk.
