= Vladislav Yasyukevich =

Belarusian footballer

Personal information
- Date of birth: 30 May 1994 (age 32)
- Place of birth: Minsk, Belarus
- Height: 1.86 m (6 ft 1 in)
- Position: Centre back

Team information
- Current team: Ostrovets
- Number: 11

Senior career*
Years	Team	Apps	(Gls)
2012–2018	Isloch Minsk Raion	139	(6)
2019	Rukh Brest	24	(3)
2020	Belshina Bobruisk	27	(0)
2021–2022	Dinamo Brest	40	(1)
2023	Molodechno	11	(0)
2023–	Ostrovets	14	(0)

International career
2016	Belarus U21	3	(0)
- * Club domestic league appearances and goals as of 31 December 2023

Vladislav Yasyukevich (Belarusian: Уладзіслаў Ясюкевіч; Russian: Владислав Ясюкевич; born 30 May 1994) is a Belarusian professional footballer who plays for Ostrovets.
