= Denis Gruzhevsky =

Belarusian footballer

Personal information
- Full name: Denis Viktorovich Gruzhevsky
- Date of birth: 10 March 2000 (age 26)
- Place of birth: Smorgon, Grodno Oblast, Belarus
- Height: 1.83 m (6 ft 0 in)
- Position: Defender

Team information
- Current team: Molodechno
- Number: 12

Youth career
- 2016–2018: Minsk

Senior career*
Years	Team	Apps	(Gls)
2019	Smorgon	25	(2)
2020	Sputnik Rechitsa	24	(2)
2021	Torpedo-BelAZ Zhodino	13	(2)
2022–2024	Shakhtyor Soligorsk	57	(1)
2025	Dinamo Brest	1	(0)
2025	Dynamo Bryansk	11	(0)
2026–	Molodechno	9	(1)

International career
2016–2017	Belarus U17	4	(0)
- * Club domestic league appearances and goals as of 6 July 2026

Denis Viktorovich Gruzhevsky (Belarusian: Дзяніс Віктаравіч Гружэўскі; Russian: Денис Викторович Гружевский; born 10 March 2000) is a Belarusian professional footballer.

== Honours ==
Shakhtyor Soligorsk

- Belarusian Super Cup winner: 2023
