= Kirill Yermakovich =

Belarusian footballer

Personal information
- Date of birth: 11 January 1999 (age 27)
- Place of birth: Minsk, Belarus
- Height: 1.81 m (5 ft 11 in)
- Position: Midfielder

Youth career
- 2016–2019: BATE Borisov

Senior career*
Years	Team	Apps	(Gls)
2018–2019	BATE Borisov	0	(0)
2019	→ Belshina Bobruisk	15	(1)
2020	Gomel	9	(3)
2020	Krumkachy Minsk	11	(2)
2021	Vitebsk	26	(0)
2022–2024	Gomel	61	(3)
2025	Naftan Novopolotsk	19	(0)

International career
2017	Belarus U17	2	(0)
- * Club domestic league appearances and goals as of 3 April 2026

Kirill Yermakovich (Belarusian: Кірыл Ермаковіч; Russian: Кирилл Ермакович; born 11 January 1999) is a Belarusian footballer.

He's a son of Belarusian footballer and coach Alyaksandr Yermakovich.

== Honours ==
Gomel

- Belarusian Cup winner: 2021–22
