= Galadima F.C. =

Nigerian football club

Galadima Football Club
- Full name: Galadima Football Club
- Founded: 2002
- Ground: Area 3 Artificial Turf Football Field, Abuja
- Capacity: 2,000
- Chairman: Abubakar Ibrahim Galadima
- Manager: Ernest Enya Patrick
- League: Nigeria Nationwide League
Home colours

Galadima Football Club formally known as Galadima Football Academy is a Nigerian football club based in Abuja, Nigeria. The team currently compete in the third division of Nigerian football league system, the Nigeria Nationwide League. They play their home matches at the Area 3 Artificial Turf Football Field, Abuja.

== History ==
The club was originally called Galadima Football Academy prior to its formation in 2002. The academy was renamed to Galadima Football Club. With increasing interest from numerous foreign scouts, three players were sponsored abroad to play in Hungary after the academy won the 7th Dreamland Embassy of Hungary Cup organized by the Embassy of Hungary in Abuja.

== Management ==
Position	Staff
Executive Director/Chairman	(Nigeria) Abubakar Ibrahim Galadima
Manager	(Nigeria) Ernest Enya Patrick
Chief Scout	(Nigeria) Kabiru Ibrahim
Scout	(Nigeria) Aminu Inuwa
Scout	(Nigeria) Aminu Jingi
Team Manager	(Nigeria) Adam Zakariya
Secretary	(Nigeria) Umar Abdullahi

== Notable players ==
- Ibrahim Saleh Yahaya, played for FC Zimbru Chisinau in Moldova 2020-2021
- Sani Suleiman Abacha, Currently plays for Budapest Honvéd FC in Hungry
- Anas Abubakar Galadima, currently plays for SFC Kalinkovo in Slovakia
- Abubakar Idris Kani, currently plays for US Monastir in Tunisia
