= Daniil Kovalev =

Belarusian footballer

Personal information
- Date of birth: 25 March 2001 (age 25)
- Place of birth: Mogilev, Belarus
- Height: 1.74 m (5 ft 9 in)
- Position: Midfielder

Youth career
- 2017: BATE Borisov
- 2017–2018: Dnepr Mogilev

Senior career*
Years	Team	Apps	(Gls)
2018	Dnepr Mogilev	2	(0)
2019	Dinamo Minsk	0	(0)
2020	Dnepr Mogilev	3	(0)
2020	→ Gorki (loan)	8	(2)
2021	Smorgon	5	(1)
2021–2022	Lokomotiv Gomel	12	(0)
2022	Orsha	8	(0)
2023	Osipovichi	28	(2)
2024	Bumprom Gomel	26	(1)
2025	Maxline Vitebsk	0	(0)
2025	→ Volna Pinsk (loan)	25	(3)
2026	Smorgon	13	(0)
- * Club domestic league appearances and goals as of 1 September 2026

Daniil Kovalev (Belarusian: Данііл Кавалёў; Russian: Даниил Ковалёв; born 25 March 2001) is a Belarusian professional footballer.
