= Nikita Kaplenko =

Belarusian footballer

Personal information
- Date of birth: 18 September 1995 (age 31)
- Place of birth: Molodechno, Minsk Region, Belarus
- Height: 1.90 m (6 ft 3 in)
- Position: Midfielder

Team information
- Current team: Arsenal Dzerzhinsk
- Number: 8

Youth career
- 2011–2014: Dinamo Minsk

Senior career*
| Years | Team | Apps | (Gls) |
| 2015–2019 | Dinamo Minsk | 73 | (0) |
| 2015 | → Bereza-2010 (loan) | 26 | (7) |
| 2020 | Torpedo-BelAZ Zhodino | 17 | (1) |
| 2021 | Chayka Peschanokopskoye | 11 | (0) |
| 2021–2022 | Volgar Astrakhan | 29 | (0) |
| 2023–2024 | Shakhtyor Soligorsk | 31 | (1) |
| 2024 | Sokol Saratov | 11 | (0) |
| 2025 | Atyrau | 7 | (0) |
| 2025– | Arsenal Dzerzhinsk | 13 | (1) |

International career
| 2012 | Belarus U17 | 3 | (1) |
| 2014–2016 | Belarus U21 | 9 | (0) |
- * Club domestic league appearances and goals as of 3 July 2026

Nikita Kaplenko (Belarusian: Мікіта Капленка; Russian: Никита Капленко; born 18 September 1995) is a Belarusian professional footballer who plays for Arsenal Dzerzhinsk.

== Honours ==
- Belarusian Super Cup winner: 2023

== Personal life ==
His younger brother Kirill Kaplenko is also a footballer.
