= Andrey Potapenko =

Belarusian professional footballer

Personal information
- Date of birth: 9 February 2000 (age 26)
- Place of birth: Minsk, Belarus
- Height: 1.76 m (5 ft 9 in)
- Position: Midfielder

Team information
- Current team: Dnepr Mogilev
- Number: 17

Youth career
- 2014–2019: BATE Borisov

Senior career*
Years	Team	Apps	(Gls)
2018–2021	BATE Borisov	0	(0)
2020	→ Arsenal Dzerzhinsk (loan)	4	(0)
2020	→ Smolevichi (loan)	8	(0)
2021	→ Slutsk (loan)	26	(1)
2022–2023	Gomel	52	(3)
2024–2025	BATE Borisov	3	(0)
2024–2025	→ Gomel (loan)	39	(3)
2026–	Dnepr Mogilev	12	(0)

International career^{‡}
2021–2022	Belarus U21	5	(0)
- * Club domestic league appearances and goals as of 3 July 2026 ‡ National team caps and goals as of 8 June 2022

Andrey Potapenko (Belarusian: Андрэй Патапенка; Russian: Андрей Потапенко; born 9 February 2000) is a Belarusian professional footballer who plays for Dnepr Mogilev.

== Honours ==
BATE Borisov

- Belarusian Cup winner: 2019–20

Gomel

- Belarusian Cup winner: 2021–22
