= Konstantin Kuchinsky =

Belarusian footballer (born 1998)

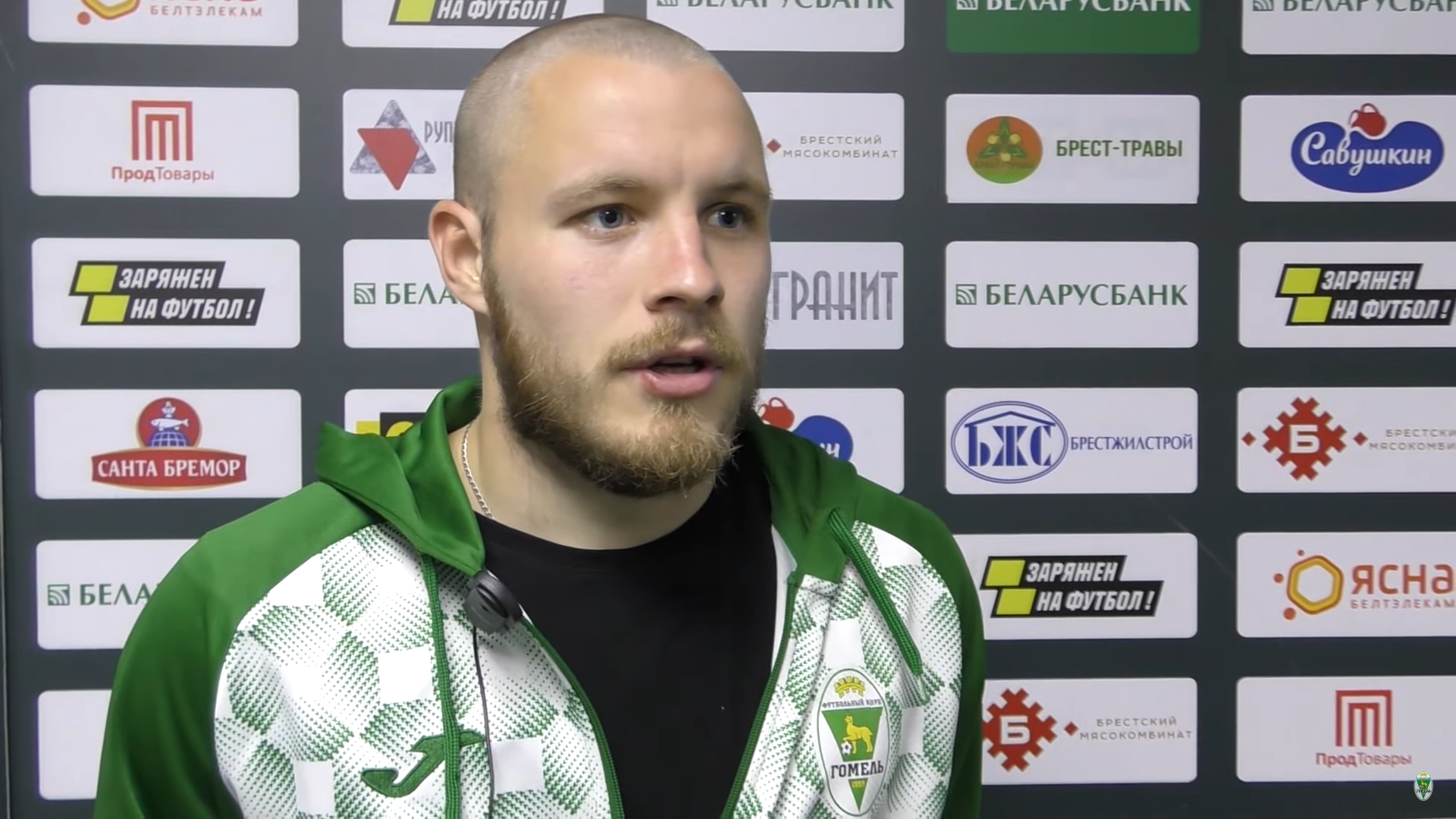

Personal information
- Full name: Konstantin Alekseyevich Kuchinsky
- Date of birth: 15 July 1998 (age 28)
- Place of birth: Minsk, Belarus
- Height: 1.72 m (5 ft 8 in)
- Position: Defender

Team information
- Current team: Minsk
- Number: 19

Youth career
- 2014–2015: RCOR-BGU Minsk

Senior career*
Years	Team	Apps	(Gls)
2015–2016	Zvezda-BGU Minsk	4	(1)
2016	→ Dinamo Minsk (loan)	0	(0)
2017–2021	Dinamo Minsk	2	(0)
2018	→ Lida (loan)	20	(2)
2019–2020	→ Belshina Bobruisk (loan)	43	(0)
2022–2023	Gomel	52	(2)
2024	Isloch Minsk Raion	14	(1)
2024	Zhetysu	9	(0)
2025	Neman Grodno	29	(3)
2026–	Minsk	9	(1)

International career
2014–2015	Belarus U17	5	(0)
2016–2017	Belarus U19	6	(0)
2019	Belarus U21	7	(0)
- * Club domestic league appearances and goals as of 6 July 2026

Konstantin Alekseyevich Kuchinsky (Belarusian: Канстанцін Аляксеевіч Кучынскі; Russian: Константин Алексеевич Кучинский; born 15 July 1998) is a Belarusian professional footballer who plays for Minsk.

== Honours ==
Gomel

- Belarusian Cup winner: 2021–22
