= Halak Dar Khadarham =

Halak Dar Khadarham هلاك درخدارحم
- Village
- Country: Iran
- Province: Lorestan
- County: Khorramabad
- Bakhsh: Papi
- Rural District: Sepiddasht

Population (2006)
  - Total: 17
- Time zone: UTC+3:30 (IRST)
  - Summer (DST): UTC+4:30 (IRDT)

Halak Dar Khadarham (Persian: هلاك درخدارحم, also Romanized as Halāḵ Dar Khadārḥam) is a village in Sepiddasht Rural District, Papi District, Khorramabad County, Lorestan Province, Iran. At the 2006 census, its population was 17, in 4 families.
