= Andrey Solovey =

Belarusian footballer

Personal information
- Date of birth: 13 December 1994 (age 31)
- Place of birth: Bereza, Brest Oblast, Belarus
- Height: 1.76 m (5 ft 9 1/2 in)
- Position: Forward

Team information
- Current team: Slavia Mozyr
- Number: 13

Youth career
- 2011–2012: Dinamo Brest

Senior career*
Years	Team	Apps	(Gls)
2012–2015	Dinamo Brest	39	(4)
2016–2017	Torpedo-BelAZ Zhodino	7	(0)
2017–2018	Slonim-2017	39	(12)
2019–2020	Lokomotiv Gomel	47	(34)
2021	Gomel	29	(18)
2022–2023	Shakhtyor Soligorsk	19	(1)
2023	→ Aksu (loan)	13	(2)
2024–	Slavia Mozyr	58	(21)

International career^{‡}
2015	Belarus U21	1	(0)
2021–2022	Belarus	8	(2)
- * Club domestic league appearances and goals as of 6 July 2026 ‡ National team caps and goals as of 13 June 2022

Andrey Solovey (Belarusian: Андрэй Салавей; Russian: Андрей Соловей; born 13 December 1994) is a Belarusian professional football player who plays for Slavia Mozyr.

== International career ==
He made his debut for Belarus national football team on 2 June 2021 in a friendly against Azerbaijan. He scored his first international goal on 26 March against India in their 3–0 win.

=== International goals ===
Scores and results list Belarus' goal tally first.

No	Date	Venue	Opponent	Score	Result	Competition
1.	26 March 2022	Khalifa Sports City Stadium, Isa Town, Bahrain	India	2–0	3–0	Friendly
2.	29 March 2022	Al Muharraq Stadium, Arad, Bahrain	Bahrain	1–0	1–0	Friendly

== Honours ==
Torpedo-BelAZ Zhodino

- Belarusian Cup winner: 2015–16

Gomel

- Belarusian Cup winner: 2021–22

Shakhtyor Soligorsk

- Belarusian Super Cup winner: 2023

== Personal life ==
His brother Artsyom Salavey is also a professional footballer.
