= Ossip Lubitch =

Belarusian painter

- Восіп Любіч
- Born: December 6, 1896; Grodno
- Died: November 27, 1990 (aged 93); Paris
- Spouse: Suzanne Boulboire

Ossip Lubitch (December 6, 1896–November 27, 1990) was a Belarusian painter who painted in Paris and was known for his illustrations of the daily life of internees at Drancy internment camp.

== Early life and education ==
Lubitch was born in Grodno, Belarus to a family of blacksmiths. He studied at the Fine Art Academy in Odesa for four years. He moved to Berlin in 1919 and created theatre and cinema sets. He moved to Paris in 1923.

== Career ==
He was accepted into the Salon des Tuileries in 1925. In 1934, he published a book of aquatint etchings, Circus, which illustrated a poem by Georges Rouault.

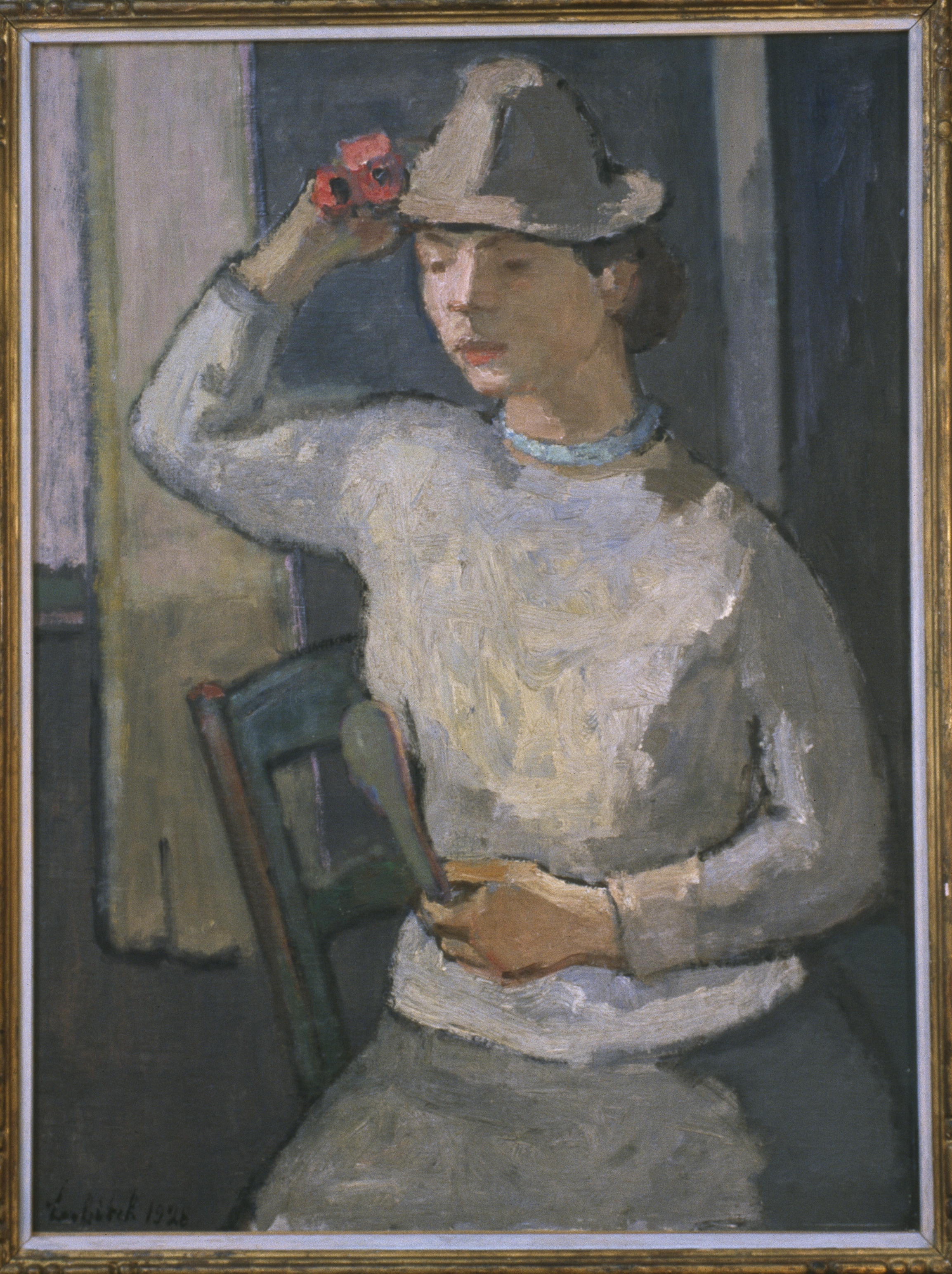
Woman at the Mirror (1928)

Lubitch continued to paint in his studio in Montmartre as World War II broke out. He did not register with the police as a Jew, and was denounced by his neighbors seeking his studio space in 1944. He was arrested by the Gestapo, and sent to Drancy internment camp.

Lubitch had brought some sketching materials to Drancy and drew sketches at night after working during the day. He survived the Holocaust, walking out of Drancy in mid-August 1944 when the German soldiers guarding the camp fled due to the approach of Allied Forces. He was able to return to his studio and live in Paris after the war.

After the war, Lubitch painted landscapes, still lives and portraits and had one-man-shows in Paris, Jerusalem, Milan, Turin and New York. He met and married the painter Suzanne Boulboire, with whom he had a daughter, Dinah, in 1950.

== Death and legacy ==
Lubitch died in Paris in 1990 and is buried in Montparnasse Cemetery. Lubitch had bequeathed the illustrations he created in Drancy to the Yad Vashem Holocaust memorial in Jerusalem. Fifty-two of his pencil drawings from Drancy are in the United States Holocaust Memorial Museum. His painting Landscape with Red Roofs was issued as a postage stamp in Belarus in 2015.
