= Pavel Lovgach =

Belarusian footballer

Personal information
- Date of birth: 2 March 1995 (age 31)
- Place of birth: Minsk, Belarus
- Height: 1.85 m (6 ft 1 in)
- Position: Midfielder

Team information
- Current team: Ostrovets
- Number: 81

Youth career
- 2011–2015: Minsk

Senior career*
Years	Team	Apps	(Gls)
2013–2016	Minsk	0	(0)
2016	→ Smorgon (loan)	4	(0)
2016	Oshmyany	13	(2)
2017	Baranovichi	25	(5)
2018	Dnepr Mogilev	16	(1)
2019	Molodechno	17	(3)
2020–	Ostrovets	86	(17)
- * Club domestic league appearances and goals as of 31 December 2023

Pavel Lovgach (Belarusian: Павел Лоўгач; Russian: Павел Ловгач; born 2 March 1995) is a Belarusian professional footballer who plays for Ostrovets.
