= Yevgeniy Voyna =

Belarusian footballer

Personal information
- Date of birth: 12 January 2000 (age 26)
- Place of birth: Slutsk, Minsk Oblast, Belarus
- Position: Defender

Youth career
- 2014–2018: RCOP-BGU Minsk

Senior career*
Years	Team	Apps	(Gls)
2019–2020	Energetik-BGU Minsk	1	(0)
2021	BGU Minsk	10	(4)
2021–2022	Lokomotiv Gomel	27	(0)
2023	Molodechno	23	(3)
2024	Energetik-BGU Minsk	31	(1)
2025–2026	Unixlabs Minsk	28	(0)
- * Club domestic league appearances and goals as of 1 September 2026

Yevgeniy Voyna (Belarusian: Яўген Война; Russian: Евгений Война; born 12 January 2000) is a Belarusian professional footballer.
