= Aleh Slautin =

Ukrainian-Belarusian footballer

Aleh Slautsin
Personal information
- Date of birth: 21 April 1986 (age 40)
- Place of birth: Simferopol, Ukrainian SSR
- Position: Striker

Senior career*
Years	Team	Apps	(Gls)
2005–2006	Dynamo-Ihroservis Simferopol	2	(0)
2008–2009	Spartak Molodizhne		
2010	Vitebsk	6	(0)
2011	Hvardiets Hvardiiske		
2012	Miory	7	(3)
2021	Gorodok Lions	4	(0)

Managerial career
- 2021–2022: Peresvet Domodedovo (assistant)
- * Club domestic league appearances and goals as of 31 December 2021

Aleh Slautsin (Belarusian: Алег Слауцін; Russian: Олег Слаутин; born 21 April 1986) is a Ukrainian and Belarusian former professional football, beach soccer and futsal player. He was a member of Belarus national beach soccer team.

== Career ==
He played for Crimean amateur clubs from 2006 until 2007. In 2008, he switched to futsal and in 2010 he moved to Belarus. Since 2013, he began switching between futsal and beach soccer depending on a season.
