= Artyom Kiyko =

Belarusian footballer

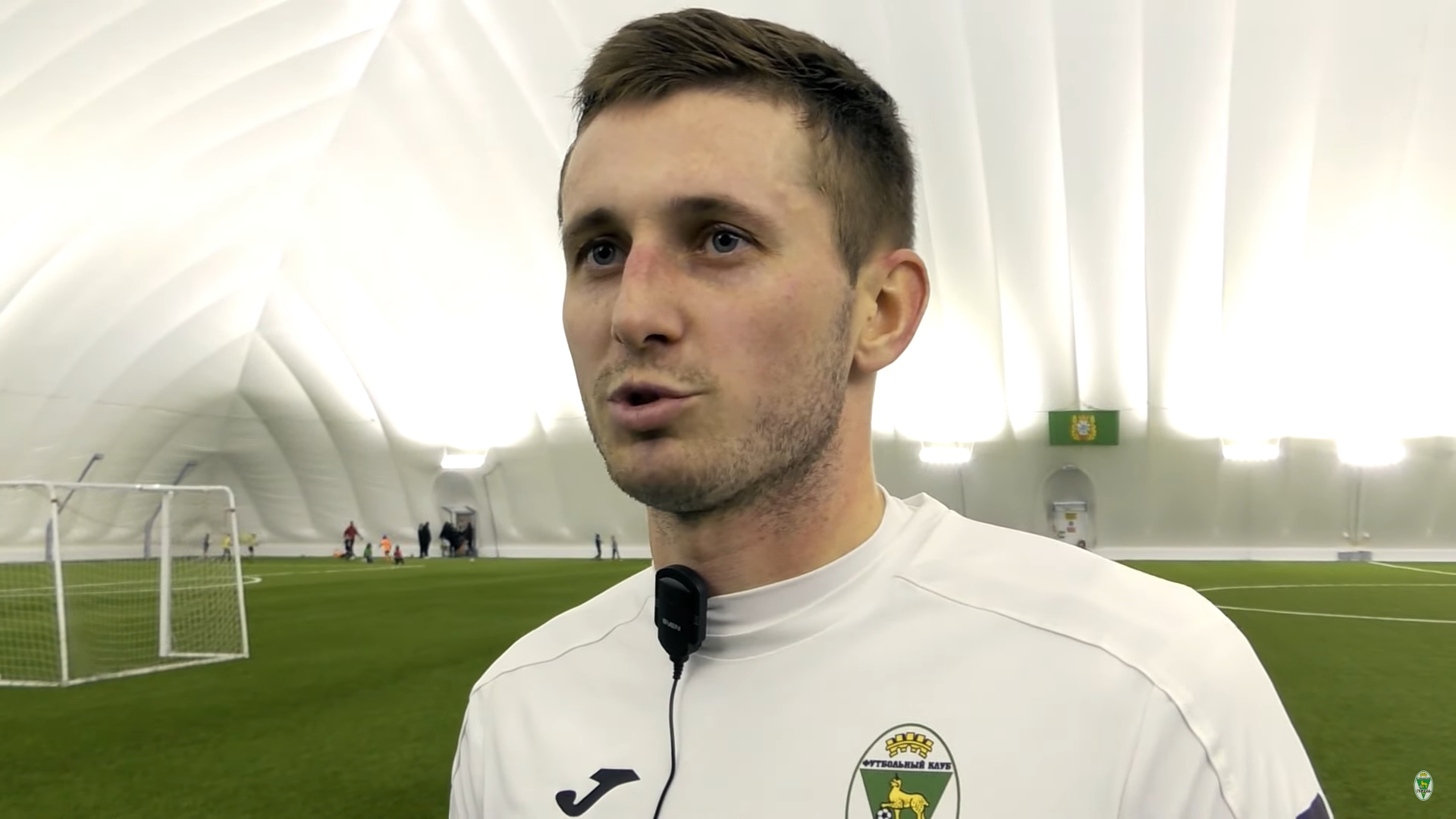

Personal information
- Date of birth: 13 January 1996 (age 30)
- Place of birth: Maryina Horka, Minsk Oblast, Belarus
- Height: 1.82 m (5 ft 11 1/2 in)
- Position: Forward

Youth career
- 2012–2015: Dinamo Minsk

Senior career*
| Years | Team | Apps | (Gls) |
| 2015–2018 | Dinamo Minsk | 6 | (1) |
| 2015 | → Bereza-2010 (loan) | 23 | (6) |
| 2018 | → Gorodeya (loan) | 6 | (0) |
| 2018 | Luch Minsk | 0 | (0) |
| 2019–2022 | Arsenal Dzerzhinsk | 109 | (41) |
| 2023 | Gomel | 9 | (0) |

International career^{‡}
| 2012–2013 | Belarus U17 | 5 | (3) |
| 2014 | Belarus U19 | 3 | (0) |
| 2017–2018 | Belarus U21 | 5 | (0) |
- * Club domestic league appearances and goals as of 31 December 2023 ‡ National team caps and goals as of 28 March 2018

Artyom Kiyko (Belarusian: Арцём Кійко; Russian: Артём Кийко; born 12 January 1996) is a Belarusian professional footballer.
