= Idris Nuradeen =

Nigerian footballer

Personal information
- Full name: Idris Nuradeen
- Date of birth: 15 January 2002 (age 24)
- Place of birth: Kaduna, Nigeria
- Height: 1.75 m (5 ft 9 in)
- Position: Forward

Team information
- Current team: Vora

Youth career
- 2020–2021: BATE Borisov

Senior career*
Years	Team	Apps	(Gls)
2021–2023	BATE Borisov	1	(0)
2021	→ Smorgon (loan)	8	(1)
2022	→ Arsenal Dzerzhinsk (loan)	7	(0)
2023	→ Smorgon (loan)	23	(4)
2024–	Vora	2	(0)
- * Club domestic league appearances and goals as of 31 August 2024

Idris Nuradeen (born 15 January 2002) is a Nigerian professional footballer who plays for Vora.
