= Vladimir Nevinsky =

Belarusian footballer and manager

Vladimir Nevinsky Уладзімір Нявінскі
Personal information
- Full name: Vladimir Vladimirovich Nevinsky
- Date of birth: 14 September 1973 (age 53)
- Place of birth: Minsk, Belarusian SSR
- Height: 1.76 m (5 ft 9 in)
- Position: Midfielder

Youth career
- Smena Minsk

Senior career*
| Years | Team | Apps | (Gls) |
| 1991–1992 | Dinamo Brest | 41 | (3) |
| 1993–1995 | Torpedo Minsk | 74 | (10) |
| 1995–1996 | Dnepr Mogilev | 27 | (9) |
| 1996 | Hapoel Beit She'an | 3 | (0) |
| 1996 | Torpedo Minsk | 4 | (4) |
| 1997 | MATÁV Sopron | 12 | (2) |
| 1997–2002 | BATE Borisov | 122 | (16) |
| 2000 | → RShVSM-Olympia Minsk | 2 | (0) |
| 2003 | Naftan Novopolotsk | 28 | (3) |
| 2004–2005 | Dinamo Brest | 37 | (2) |
| 2006 | PMC Postavy | 32 | (7) |
| 2007 | Partizan-2 Minsk | 29 | (2) |

International career
| 1992–1994 | Belarus U21 | 5 | (0) |

Managerial career
- 2006–2008: Partizan-2 Minsk (assistant)
- 2009–2013: BATE Borisov (reserves, youth assistant)
- 2014–2017: BATE Borisov (assistant)
- 2018: Torpedo Minsk (assistant)
- 2018–2019: Torpedo Minsk
- 2020–2021: Neman Grodno (assistant)
- 2022–2023: Gomel
- * Club domestic league appearances and goals

Vladimir Vladimirovich Nevinsky (Belarusian: Уладзімір Уладзіміравіч Нявінскі; Russian: Владимир Владимирович Невинский; born 14 September 1973) is a Belarusian professional football coach and a former player.

In 2018–2019 he was a head coach at Torpedo Minsk.

== Honours ==
BATE Borisov

- Belarusian Premier League champion: 1999, 2002
