= Artem Shkurdyuk =

Belarusian footballer

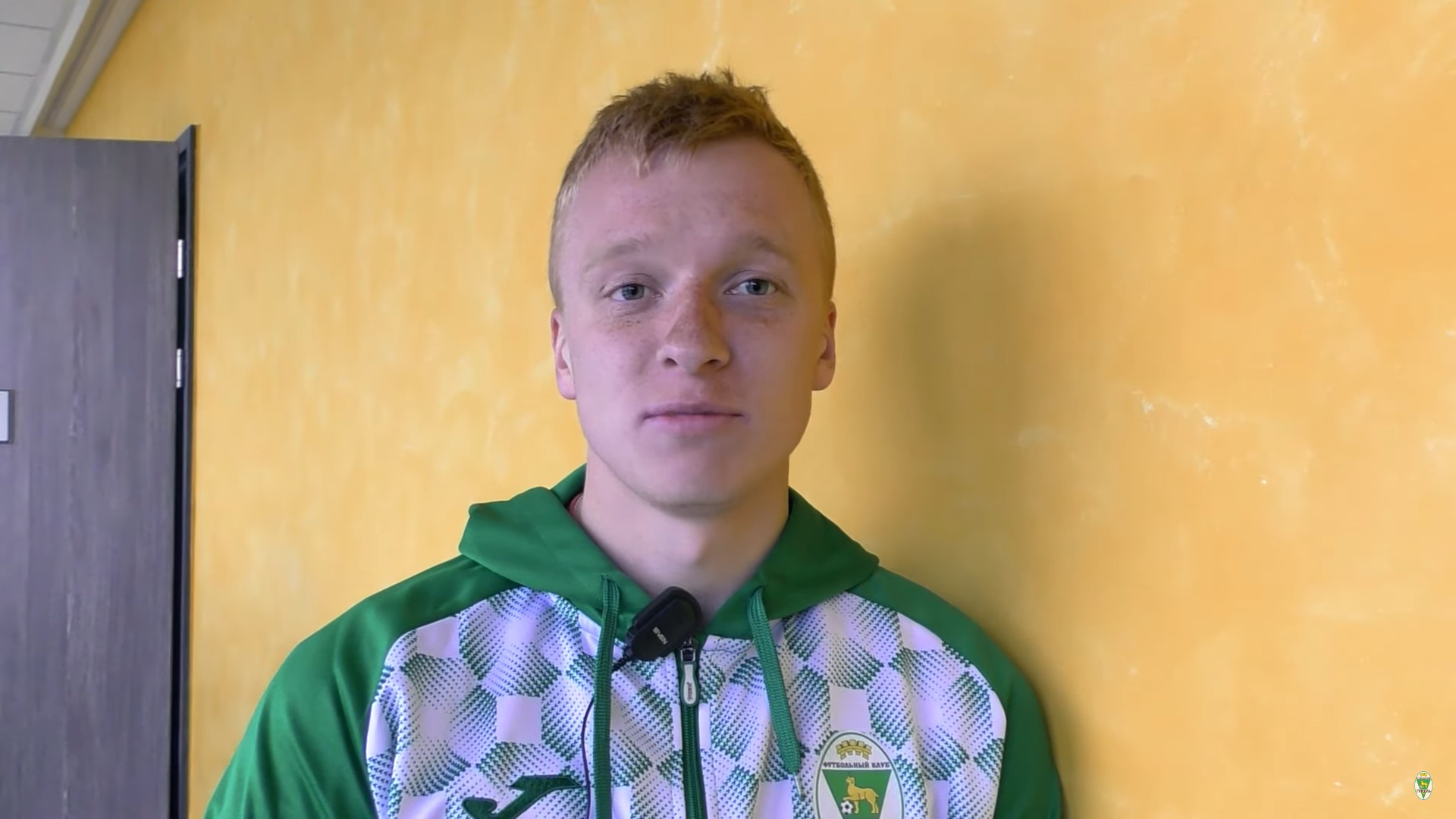

Personal information
- Date of birth: 20 August 1998 (age 28)
- Place of birth: Minsk, Belarus
- Height: 1.84 m (6 ft 0 in)
- Position: Defender

Youth career
- 2015–2017: BATE Borisov

Senior career*
Years	Team	Apps	(Gls)
2017–2021	BATE Borisov	1	(0)
2018–2021	→ Energetik-BGU Minsk (loan)	67	(2)
2023	Gomel	8	(1)

International career^{‡}
2018–2020	Belarus U21	11	(1)
- * Club domestic league appearances and goals as of 31 December 2023 ‡ National team caps and goals as of 15 November 2020

Artem Shkurdyuk (Belarusian: Арцём Шкурдзюк; Russian: Артём Шкурдюк; born 20 August 1998) is a Belarusian former professional footballer.

== Honours ==
BATE Borisov

- Belarusian Premier League champion: 2018
