= Aleh Hulak =

Belarusian human rights activist (1967–2022)

Aleh Mikalajewitsch Hulak (1 September 1967 – 16 December 2022) (Belorussian Алег Мікалаевіч Гулак, Russian Олег Николаевич Гулак, Oleg Nikolajewitsch Gulak; was a Belarusian human rights defender. He was the chairman of the Belarusian Helsinki Committee. He was regarded as a leader of the Belarus human rights movement.

In 2016, he was awarded the Deutsch-Französischer Preis für Menschenrechte und Rechtsstaatlichkeit.
