= Yury Lovets =

Belarusian footballer (born 1996)

Personal information
- Full name: Yury Sergeyevich Lovets
- Date of birth: 11 July 1996 (age 30)
- Place of birth: Minsk, Belarus
- Height: 1.82 m (6 ft 0 in)
- Position: Midfielder

Team information
- Current team: Bishkek City
- Number: 11

Youth career
- 2011–2015: Minsk

Senior career*
Years	Team	Apps	(Gls)
2015–2016	Minsk	0	(0)
2016	→ Torpedo Minsk (loan)	12	(1)
2017–2018	Torpedo Minsk	33	(3)
2018	→ Chist (loan)	11	(2)
2019	Arsenal Dzerzhinsk	25	(3)
2020	AFC Eskilstuna	0	(0)
2020–2021	Arsenal Dzerzhinsk	37	(4)
2021–2022	Slavia Mozyr	43	(4)
2023	Gomel	14	(2)
2023	Spartak Kostroma	15	(0)
2024–2026	Arsenal Dzerzhinsk	72	(11)
2026–	Bishkek City	5	(0)

International career^{‡}
2017	Belarus U21	1	(0)
- * Club domestic league appearances and goals as of 30 August 2026 ‡ National team caps and goals as of 31 December 2017

Yury Sergeyevich Lovets (Belarusian: Юрый Сяргеевіч Лавец; Russian: Юрий Сергеевич Ловец; born 11 July 1996) is a Belarusian professional footballer who plays for Bishkek City.

== Career ==
In January 2020 he signed with Swedish side AFC Eskilstuna along with Nikita Patsko. However, after the start of 2020 Superettan season was delayed due to COVID-19 pandemic, both players returned to Belarus and re-signed with Arsenal Dzerzhinsk.
