= Artyom Sokol (Belarusian footballer) =

Belarusian footballer

Personal information
- Full name: Artyom Anatolyevich Sokol
- Date of birth: 30 March 1994 (age 32)
- Place of birth: Minsk, Belarus
- Height: 1.84 m (6 ft 0 in)
- Position: Centre-back

Team information
- Current team: Minsk
- Number: 3

Youth career
- 2011–2014: Dinamo Minsk

Senior career*
| Years | Team | Apps | (Gls) |
| 2014–2015 | Dinamo Minsk | 0 | (0) |
| 2015 | → Bereza-2010 (loan) | 25 | (0) |
| 2016 | Dnepr Mogilev | 10 | (0) |
| 2016–2018 | Torpedo Minsk | 61 | (5) |
| 2019 | Gomel | 11 | (0) |
| 2020–2021 | Energetik-BGU Minsk | 49 | (1) |
| 2022 | Gomel | 26 | (1) |
| 2023 | Surkhon Termiz | 17 | (0) |
| 2024 | Dinamo Samarqand | 3 | (0) |
| 2025 | Persikabo 1973 | 6 | (0) |
| 2025– | Minsk | 24 | (1) |

International career
| 2011 | Belarus U19 | 1 | (0) |
| 2012–2014 | Belarus U21 | 8 | (0) |
- * Club domestic league appearances and goals as of 6 July 2026

Artyom Anatolyevich Sokol (Belarusian: Арцём Анатольевіч Сокал; Russian: Артём Анатольевич Сокол; born 30 March 1994) is a Belarusian professional footballer who plays as a centre-back for Belarusian Premier League club Minsk.

== Honours ==
Gomel

- Belarusian Cup: 2021–22
