= Aleh Kavalyow =

Belarusian footballer

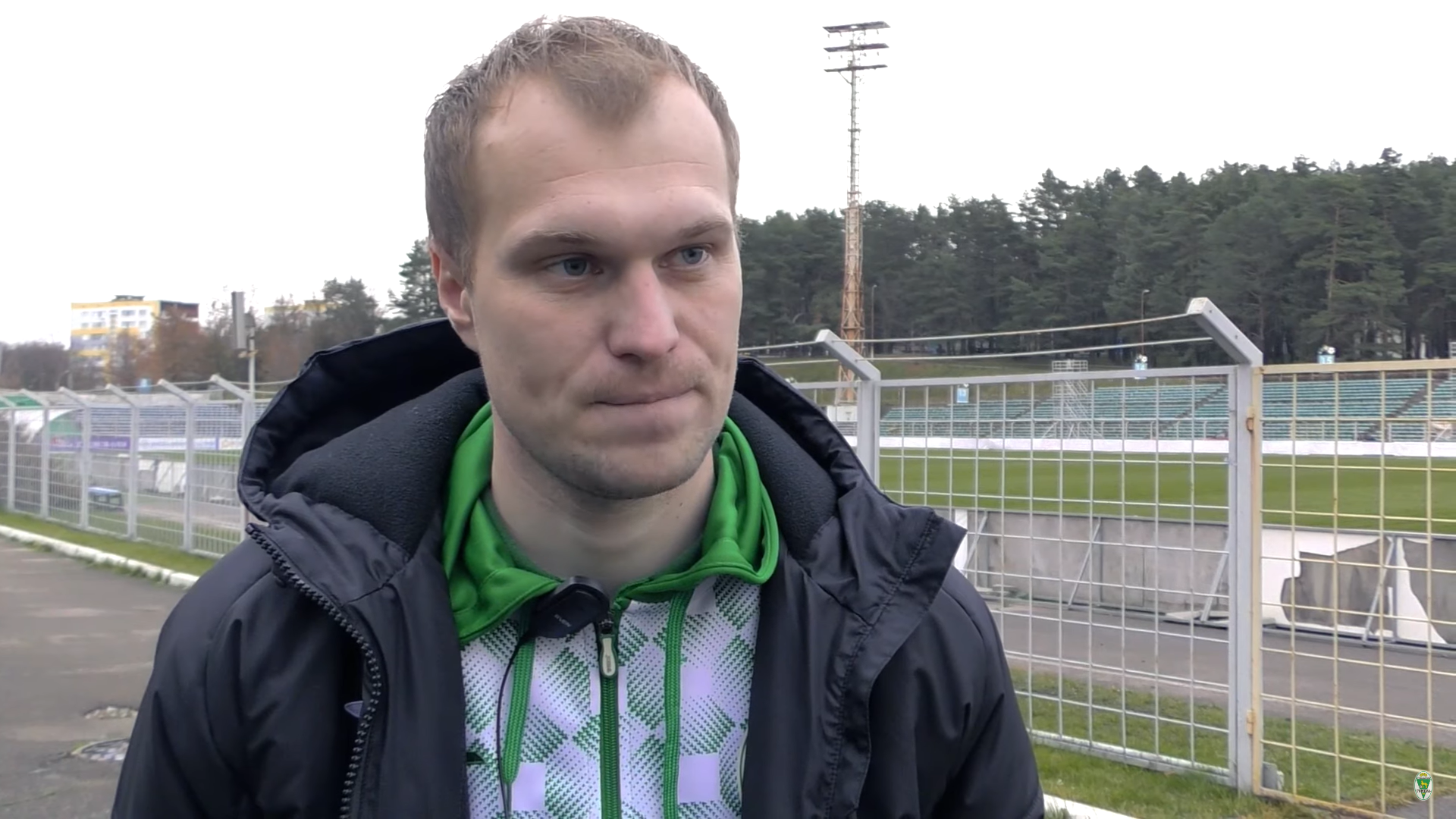

Personal information
- Date of birth: 24 May 1987 (age 39)
- Place of birth: Gomel, Belarusian SSR
- Height: 1.90 m (6 ft 3 in)
- Position: Goalkeeper

Youth career
- 2004–2007: Gomel

Senior career*
| Years | Team | Apps | (Gls) |
| 2008 | DSK Gomel | 14 | (0) |
| 2008–2010 | Gomel | 7 | (0) |
| 2011–2012 | DSK Gomel | 55 | (0) |
| 2013–2014 | Rechitsa-2014 | 48 | (0) |
| 2015–2026 | Gomel | 121 | (0) |
- * Club domestic league appearances and goals as of 21 November 2026

Aleh Kavalyow (Belarusian: Алег Кавалёў; Russian: Олег Николаевич Ковалёв; born 24 May 1987) is a Belarusian former professional footballer.

== Honours ==
Gomel

- Belarusian Cup winner: 2021–22
