= Nikita Tsarenko =

Belarusian professional footballer

Personal information
- Date of birth: 9 July 2002 (age 24)
- Place of birth: Gomel, Belarus
- Position: Midfielder

Team information
- Current team: Leskhoz Gomel
- Number: 97

Youth career
- 2016–2020: Gomel

Senior career*
Years	Team	Apps	(Gls)
2020–2023	Gomel	2	(0)
2020	→ Osipovichi (loan)	6	(0)
2023	→ Lokomotiv Gomel (loan)	12	(0)
2024–	Leskhoz Gomel		
- * Club domestic league appearances and goals as of 8 December 2023

Nikita Tsarenko (Belarusian: Мікіта Царэнка; Russian: Никита Царенко; born 9 July 2002) is a Belarusian professional footballer who plays for Leskhoz Gomel.

== Honours ==
Gomel

- Belarusian Cup winner: 2021–22
