= 2022–23 Belarusian Cup =

Tournament details
- Country: Belarus
- Teams: 104

Final positions
- Champions: Torpedo-BelAZ Zhodino
- Runners-up: BATE Borisov

Tournament statistics
- Matches played: 108
- Goals scored: 431 (3.99 per match)
- Top goal scorer(s): Viktor Lagutin, Bumprom Gomel (10)

2022–23 Belarusian Cup, known as the Parimatch-Belarus Cup for sponsorship purposes, was the 32nd season of the Belarusian annual cup competition. Contrary to the league season, it is conducted in a fall-spring rhythm. The competition started on 29 April 2022 and ended with the final match in May 2023. The winner of the cup, Torpedo-BelAZ Zhodino, qualified for the second qualifying round of the 2023–24 UEFA Europa Conference League.

The defending champions were FC Gomel.

== Preliminary round ==
75 clubs from the Belarusian Second League and lower regional leagues entered in this round, with Polotsk 2019 advancing directly to the first round. The draw was performed on 13 April 2022. The matches were played between 29 April and 11 May.

Number of teams per tier still in competition
Premier League (1)	First League (2)	Second League (3)	Total
16 / 16	13 / 13	75 / 75	104 / 104

29 April 2022	Serebryanka (III)	0–3	FC Torpedo Minsk (III)	Syerabranka
13:00		Report

29 April 2022	FK Krukpki DRSU 164 (III)	0–3	FK Bobovnya (III)	Krupki
13:00		Report

29 April 2022	FK Krasnopolje (III)	3–0	FSK Kirovsk (III)	Krasnopolje
13:00		Report

30 April 2022	FK Miory (III)	5–2	FK Postavy (III)	Miory
13:00		Report		Stadium: Stadyen Haradski

30 April 2022	Chaika Zelva (III)	1–0	Fakel Novogrudok (III)	Zelva
13:00		Report		Stadium: Stadyen Kolas

30 April 2022	Viliya Vileika (III)	1–5	Zhodino-Yuzhnoe Zhodino (III)	Vileyka
13:00		Report		Stadium: Stadyen Haradski Vileyka

30 April 2022	Leskhoz Gomel (III)	5–0	Dnepr-Rogachev (III)	Gomel
13:00		Report		Stadium: Stadyen Lakamatyu

30 April 2022	Nadezhda Gorodishche (III)	1–4	Novaya Pripyat Olshany (III)	Horodyshche
14:00		Report		Stadium: Stadyen DYuSSh

30 April 2022	FK Senno (III)	4–1	Niva Tolochin (III)	Syanno
14:00		Report		Stadium: Stadyen Haradski Syanno

30 April 2022	Kolos Cherven (III)	1–1 (4–5 p)	Partizan Soligorsk (III)	Červień
14:00		Report		Stadium: Stadyen Haradski Červień

30 April 2022	FC Gorki (III)	8–1	Zarya Krugloe (III)	Horki
14:00		Report		Stadium: Stadyen Haradski Horki

30 April 2022	FC Zhlobin (III)	3–1	FC Svetlogorsk (III)	Zhlobin
14:00		Report		Stadium: Lokomotiv Stadium

30 April 2022	Edinstvo Dzerzhinsk (III)	4–0	FC Uzda (III)	Dzyarzhynsk
15:00		Report		Stadium: Stadyen Haradski

30 April 2022	Sozh Krichev (III)	0–2	Tekhnolog-BGUT Mogilev (III)	Krychaw
15:00		Report		Stadium: Stadyen SOZH

30 April 2022	Vetka DYuSSh (III)	0–4	Vertikal Kalinkovichi (III)	Vietka
15:00		Report		Stadium: Stadyen Haradski Vietka

30 April 2022	Krechet Bereza (III)	3–0	Granit Mikashevichi (III)	Byaroza
16:00		Report		Stadium: Stadyen DYuSSH-1

30 April 2022	FK Svislach (III)	6–4	FSK Dyatlovo (III)	Svislach
16:00		Report		Stadium: Stadyen Haradski Svislač

30 April 2022	Smena Volkovysk (III)	0–1	FSK Grodnenskiy Skidel (III)	Vawkavysk
16:00		Report		Stadium: Stadyen Vawkavysk

30 April 2022	FK Berezino (III)	2–1	FK Klezk (III)	Byerazino
16:00		Report		Stadium: Stadyen Haradski Byerazino

30 April 2022	Bumprom Gomel (III)	17–1	Iput-DYuSSh Dobrush (III)	Gomel
16:00		Report		Stadium: Stadyen DYuSSh-8

30 April 2022	MNPZ Mozyr (III)	2–1	DYuSSh-2 Rechitsa (III)	Mozyr
16:00		Report		Stadium: Stadyen Spartak

30 April 2022	Niva Dolbizno (III)	4–0	FC Luninets (III)	Dolbizno
17:00		Report		Stadium: Stadyen Niva

30 April 2022	FK Ivanovo (III)	2–3	FK Drogichin (III)	Ivanava
17:00		Report		Stadium: Stadyen DYuSSh Ivanava

1 May 2022	DYuSSh Ivatsevichi (III)	1–0	EvroEksport Vysokoe (III)	Ivatsevichy
13:00		Report		Stadium: Klenovka Arena

1 May 2022	FK Atlant Kobrin (III)	1–4	FK Malorita (III)	Kobryn
14:00		Report		Stadium: Stadyen Junatstva

1 May 2022	Gorodokskie Lvy Gorodok (III)	2–4	Gazovik Vitebsk (III)	Haradok
14:00		Report		Stadium: Stadyen Haradski Haradok

1 May 2022	FK Lepel (III)	1–6	Veles-2020 Vitebsk (III)	Lyepyel
14:00		Report		Stadium: Stadyen F.O.C. Haradski Lepiel

1 May 2022	DYuSSH Stolin (III)	0–5	FK Stenles Pinsk (III)	Stolin
14:00		Report		Stadium: Stadyen Stolin

1 May 2022	FK Krumkachi Minsk (III)	5–1	Energetik-BGATU Minsk (III)	Minsk
14:30		Report		Stadium: Stadyen RTsOP-BGU

1 May 2022	Neman-Belkard Grodno (III)	9–1	FK Mosty (III)	Grodno
15:00		Report		Stadium: Stadyen Nyoman Iskusstvennoe pole

1 May 2022	Kronon Stolbtsy (III)	2–5 (a.e.t.)	Viktoria Marina Gorka (III)	Stowbtsy
15:00		Report		Stadium: Stadyen Junatsva

1 May 2022	FK Shchuchin (III)	6–2 (a.e.t.)	Slonim City (III)	Shchuchyn
16:00		Report		Stadium: Stadyen Olimp Shchuchyn

1 May 2022	FC Starye Dorogi (III)	1–0	Respect Soligorsk (III)	Staryya Darohi
16:00		Report		Stadium: Stadyen Stroitel' Staryya Darohi

1 May 2022	Spartak Shklov (III)	5–1	Niva Chausy (III)	Shklow
17:00		Report		Stadium: Stadyen Spartak

1 May 2022	BGU Minsk (III)	1–2	Uni Minsk (III)	Minsk
18:00		Report		Stadium: Stadyen RTsOP-BGU

5 May 2022	FK Urozhaynaya (III)	1–2	Traktor Minsk (III)	Minsk
19:00		Report		Stadium: Stadyen RTsOP-BGU

11 May 2022	Spartak Slutsk (III)	3–1 (a.e.t.)	Falko Dzerzhinsk Region (III)	Slutsk
18:00		Report		Stadium: Slutskyĭ Hosudarstvennyĭ Kolledz͡h

== First round ==
38 clubs competed in this round. 18 matches took place with Polotsk 2019 and FC Zhlobin advancing directly to the second round. The draw was performed on 10 May 2022 at the House of Football. The matches were played on 14 and 15 May.

Number of teams per tier still in competition
Premier League (1)	First League (2)	Second League (3)	Total
16 / 16	13 / 13	38 / 75	89 / 104

14 May 2022	Uni Minsk (III)	5–4	Torpedo Minsk (III)	Minsk
16:30		Report		Stadium: Stadyen RTsOP-BGU

14 May 2022	Bumprom Gomel (III)	3–1	Leskhoz Gomel (III)	Gomel
17:30		Report		Stadium: Stadyen DYuSSh-8

15 May 2022	FK Malorita (III)	1–0	Krechet Bereza (III)	Malaryta
12:00		Report		Stadium: Stadyen Malaryta

15 May 2022	DYuSSh Ivatsevichi (III)	3–7	Niva Dolbizno (III)	Ivatsevichy
12:00		Report		Stadium: Klenovka Arena

15 May 2022	FK Senno (III)	4–5 (a.e.t.)	FK Miory (III)	Syanno
14:00		Report		Stadium: Stadyen Haradski Syanno

15 May 2022	FK Shchuchin (III)	2–1 (a.e.t.)	FSK Grodnenskiy (III)	Shchuchyn
14:00		Report		Stadium: Stadyen Olimp Shchuchyn

15 May 2022	Vertikal Kalinkovichi (III)	0–4	MNPZ Mozyr (III)	Kalinkavichy
14:00		Report		Stadium: Stadyen SDYuShOR-2

15 May 2022	Stanles Pinsk (III)	2–0	Novaya Pripyat Olshany (III)	Pinsk
15:00		Report		Stadium: Stadyen Akademii Futbola

15 May 2022	Gazovik Vitebsk (III)	1–0	Veles-2020 Vitebsk (III)	Vitebsk
16:00		Report		Stadium: CSK Vitebskiy Iskusstvennoe pole

15 May 2022	Tekhnolog-BGUT Mogilev (III)	3–0	FK Krasnopolje (III)	Mogilev
16:00		Report		Stadium: Stadion SDYuShOR-7

15 May 2022	FK Svisloch (III)	3–1	Chaika Zelva (III)	Svislach
16:00		Report		Stadium: Stadyen Haradski Svislač

15 May 2022	FK Drogichin (III)	0–2	Neman-Belkard Grodno (III)	Drahichyn
16:00		Report		Stadium: Stadyen Drahičyn

15 May 2022	Zhodino-Yuzhnoe Zhodino (III)	9–1	FK Berezino (III)	Zhodzina
16:00		Report		Stadium: Stadyen Tarpeda

15 May 2022	Spartak Shklov (III)	2–6	FK Gorki (III)	Shklow
17:00		Report		Stadium: Stadyen Spartak

15 May 2022	Spartak Slutsk (III)	0–2	Edinstvo Dzerzhinsk (III)	Slutsk
17:00		Report		Stadium: Slutskyĭ Hosudarstvennyĭ Kolledz͡h

15 May 2022	FK Stariye Dorogi (III)	2–1 (a.e.t.)	Viktoria Marina Gorka (III)	Staryya Darohi
17:00		Report		Stadium: Stadyen Stroitel' Staryya Darohi

15 May 2022	FK Bobovnya (III)	3–0	Partizan Soligorsk (III)	Kapyl
17:00		Report		Stadium: Stadyen Haradski Kopyl

15 May 2022	Traktor Minsk (III)	0–5	Krumkachi Minsk (III)	Minsk
19:15		Report		Stadium: Stadyen RTsOP-BGU

== Second round ==
32 clubs competed in this round, including 12 teams from the First League entering the competition at this stage. The draw was performed on 18 May 2022 at the House of Football. The matches were played on 28 and 29 May.

Number of teams per tier still in competition
Premier League (1)	First League (2)	Second League (3)	Total
16 / 16	13 / 13	20 / 75	49 / 108

28 May 2022	FK Bobovnya (III)	2–3	FC Lokomotiv Gomel (II)	Kapyl
12:00	Galitskiy (yellow card) 19'; Radkevich (yellow card) 34' (goal) 37'; Stetsko 75'; Kornushenko (yellow card) 90+1'	Report	Teslyuk 32'; Kuchinskiy (yellow card) 44'; Starostenko (yellow card) 61' (yellow-red card) 67'; Azerskiy 71'; Zhostkin 89' (pen.)	Stadium: Stadyen Haradski Kopyl; Referee: Mikhael Glyakov

28 May 2022	FK Malorita (III)	1–2	FC Ostrovets (II)	Brest
12:00	Klimuk (yellow card) 20' (goal) 89'; Chizh (yellow card) 79'; Miloshevskiy (yellow card) 86'	Report	Blevich (yellow card) 42'; Chitanava (yellow card) 80'; Novik 82' (pen.); Kaloshkin 84'	Stadium: Stadyen Junost; Referee: Sergey Klimashevskiy

28 May 2022	MNPZ Mozyr (III) (III)	0–1	FC Orsha (II)	Mazyr
15:00		Report	Balbukh (yellow card) 30'; Nemchenok (yellow card) 37'; Berezun (yellow card) 47'; Khinchagov (yellow card) 80'; Zakharov 82'; Ermakovich (yellow card) 90+2'	Stadium: Stadyen Spartak; Referee: Sergey Chistov

28 May 2022	Stanles Pinsk (III)	3–2	FK Zhlobin (III)	Pinsk
15:00	Kurgan 52'; Golovko (yellow card) 67'; Rushnitskiy 85'; Kolyada (yellow card) 87'; Kulina 90+1'; Malashitskiy (yellow card) 90+4'	Report	Savko 45'; Lebedev (yellow card) 47'; Kolesnev 53'; Chernysh (yellow card) 60'; Kozlov (yellow card) 73'	Stadium: Stadyen Valna; Referee: Dmitry Dubatovka

28 May 2022	FK Shchuchin (III)	2–5	FC Smorgon (II)	Shchuchyn
15:00	Baygot 24', 28'; Belyavskiy (yellow card) 50'; Stupakevich (yellow card) 86'; Matysevskiy (yellow card) 90+2'	Report	Usenya 1'; Likhtin 51' (pen.); Tamelo 54'; Gorbach 69'; Barysaw (yellow card) 71'; Kopytich 85'	Stadium: Stadion Olimp Shchuchyn; Referee: Dmitry Kovalevskiy

28 May 2022	FC Gorki (III)	1–2	FC Baranovichi (II)	Horki
15:00	Verenich 59'; Bubnov (yellow card) 81'	Report	Derneyko (yellow card) 34' (goal) 48'; Kryukov 76'	Stadium: Stadyen Haradski Horki; Referee: Pavel Yakovenko

28 May 2022	Bumprom Gomel (III)	0–1	FC Molodechno (II)	Gomel
15:30	Simonchik (yellow card) 4'; Khalimonchikov (yellow card) 23'; Fomin (yellow card) 86'	Report	Shilo (yellow card) 24'; Melnik (yellow card) 32'; Kazantsev (yellow card) 36'; Balikoyev (yellow card) 42'; Rassolko (yellow card) 43'; Saramakha (yellow card) 72'; Shumilov 79'; Burak (yellow card) 88'	Stadium: Stadyen DYuSSh-8; Referee: Stanislav Ananiev

28 May 2022	Neman-Belkard Grodno (III)	1–6	Zhodino-Yuzhnoe Zhodino (III)	Grodno
15:30	Staskevich 5' (yellow card) 78'; Kotin (yellow card) 45+2'; Markovets (red card) 71'	Report	Lapshin 7' (yellow card) 45+2'; Zavadskiy 38'; Simonchik 56'; Kazlovskiy 72' (pen.) 79' (pen.); Tumilovich 88'	Stadium: Stadyen Nyoman Iskusstvennoe pole Referee: Olga Tereshko

28 May 2022	Uni Minsk (III)	0–4	FC Naftan Novopolotsk (II)	Minsk
17:00	N'Guintsop (yellow card) 76'; Morozov (yellow card) 80'	Report	Kontsevoy 30'; Ignatenko 43'; Malinovskiy (yellow card) 58'; Kiyomidinov 59'; Lutsevich (yellow card) 61'; Drabatovich 87'	Stadium: Stadyen RTsOP-BGU; Referee: Pavel Gritsuk

28 May 2022	Tekhnolog-BGUT Mogilev (III)	3–0	FK Miory (III)	Mogilev
17:00	Lysko 20'; Zheleznyakovich 33'; Mirahmadov 88'	Report	Petkevich (yellow card) 53'; Shevtsov (yellow card) 61'; Grechukha (yellow card) 75'; Korenvskiy (yellow card) 76'	Stadium: Stadyen МGUP; Referee: Vadzim Lankouski

29 May 2022	Edinstvo Dzerzhinsk (III)	0–2	Gazovik Vitebsk (III)	Dzyarzhynsk
14:00	Dubovik (yellow card) 62'; Tereshko (yellow card) 64'; Gradovets (yellow card) 76'; Gorevalov (yellow card) 80'; Sosnovich (yellow card) 90'	Report	Goncharenko (yellow card) 55'; Vanenok 61'; Sharabayko 65'; Vakar (yellow card) 76'; Lebedev (yellow card) 76'	Stadium: Stadyen Haradski; Referee: Evgeniy Naumov

29 May 2022	Niva Dolbizno (III)	1–1 (a.e.t.) (3–5 p)	FC Lida (II)	Dolbizno
15:00	Leshkevich (yellow card) 10'; Priko (yellow card) 39'; Kozel 60'; Khovavko (yellow card) 69'; Yaroshik (yellow card) 88'	Report	Karpov (yellow card) 23'; Zyanko 32'; Karpovich (red card) 73'; Yukhnovich (yellow card) 95'; Rogach (yellow card) 102'; Burnos (yellow card) 109'	Stadium: Stadyen Niva; Referee: Kiryl Apanovich

29 May 2022	FK Polotsk 2019 (III)	0–9	FC Maxline Rogachev (II)	Polotsk
15:00	Amaris (yellow card) 37'; Kanonik (yellow card) 64'; Moukoudi (yellow card) 64'; Golenkov (yellow card) 90+4'	Report	Prokopenko 1'; Trachynski 10', 14'; Vasilyew 18'; Polyakov 21' (o.g.); Krasnov 42', 65'; Fedorenko 56' (pen.) 83'	Stadium: Stadyen Spartak; Referee: Aleksey Shipitsa

29 May 2022	Krumkachi Minsk (III)	4–3 (a.e.t.)	FC Slonim-2017 (II)	Minsk
16:00	Fastovets 13', 26', 90+1'; Komarov (yellow card) 39'; Pavlyuchek (yellow card) 51'; Ladutko (yellow card) 62'; Starikov (yellow card) 83'; Kuratnik (yellow card) 84'; Yatskevich 95'; Lisyuk (yellow card) 107'	Report	Tolkin 19' (yellow card) 105+1'; Askerov (yellow card) 24'; Spasyuk 32' (pen.); Zhurnevich 34'	Stadium: Stadyen RTsOP-BGU; Referee: Aleksandr Kolochinskiy

29 May 2022	FK Stariye Dorogi (III)	1–2	FC Osipovichi (II)	Staryya Darohi
16:00	Kovalevskiy (yellow card) 73'; Lapko (yellow card) 87'; Bodas 90+4'	Report	Kolomatskiy 32' (yellow card) 63'; Aleksandr Yemelyanaw 39' (pen.); Stryzheus (yellow card) 71'; Shyshkin (yellow card) 72'; Andrey Yemelyanaw (yellow card) 90+3'	Stadium: Stadyen Stroitel' Staryya Darohi; Referee: Vladimir Rusakov

29 May 2022	FK Svisloch (III)	0–9	FC Volna Pinsk (II)	Svislach
16:00	Savosko (yellow card) 8'; Vasilevskiy (yellow card) 21'; Astashenkov (red card) 90'	Report	Vodyanovich 12'; Tkachik (yellow card) 30'; Karpenya (yellow card) 33'; Sen 41'; Malashevich 50', 69', 75', 78'; Volodko 64'; Bozhko 86'; Grechikha 90' (pen.)	Stadium: Stadyen Haradski Svislač; Referee: Nikita Shiyan

== Round of 32 ==
32 clubs will compete in this round, the 16 winners from the second round and the 16 teams from the Belarusbank Major League, all of which enter the competition at this stage. Four teams from the Belarusian 2. Division remain in the tournament. The draw was performed on 31 May 2022 at the House of Football. The matches will be played 21–23 June.

Number of teams per tier still in competition
Premier League (1)	First League (2)	Second League (3)	Total
16 / 16	12 / 13	4 / 75	32 / 108

21 June 2022	FC Smorgon (II)	1–3	FC Slutsk (I)	Smorgon
17:30	Kovalevich (yellow card) 82'; Tamelo 84'	Report	Bylinkin (yellow card) 54'; Hlyabko 80'; Zhevnerov 80'; Rusak 90+2'	Stadium: Stadyen Junatstva; Attendance: 326; Referee: Dmitri Kovalevski

21 June 2022	Maxline Rogachev (II)	2–3 (a.e.t.)	FC Vitebsk (I)	Rogachev
18:00	Lukashevich (yellow card) 42'; Prokopenko 50'; Izhakovsky (yellow card) 65'; Balanovich (yellow card) 65'; Vasilyew 90'	Report	Yarotsky (yellow card) 22'; Rassadkin 35'; Matveyenko 69'; Teverov (yellow card) 85'; Lebedzew 93'; Ksenofontov (yellow card) 94'	Stadium: Stadyen DYuSSh-1; Attendance: 1,950; Referee: Sergei Krasnikov

21 June 2022	FC Osipovichi (II)	1–3	FC Neman Grodno (I)	Osipovichi
18:30	Yelezarenko 25'; Fazylov (yellow card) 77'	Report	Zubovich 21', 66'; Shalashinikov (yellow card) 45+1'; Savitski 82'	Stadium: Stadyen Junatstva; Attendance: 320; Referee: Dmitri Dmitriev

21 June 2022	Stenles Pinsk (III)	1–2	FC BATE Borisov (I)	Pinsk
19:00	Malashitskiy 68' (pen.)	Report	Zhulpa 20'; Vasilevich 25'; Nosko (yellow card) 65'; Bessmertny (yellow card) 72'	Stadium: Stadyen Valna; Attendance: 2,800; Referee: Stanislav Ananiev

22 June 2022	FC Baranovichi (II)	1–3 (a.e.t.)	FC Energetik-BGU Minsk (I)	Baranavichy
16:30	Kipra 90+1'; Derneyko (yellow card) 99'; Mikhaltsov (yellow card) 102'	Report	Jumakulov (yellow card) 24'; Lavrik (yellow card) 81'; Omelyanchuk (yellow card) 83'; Abdikholikov 89'; Grishchenko 114', 116'	Stadium: Stadyen Lyakamatyu; Attendance: 550; Referee: Shipitsa Alexey

22 June 2022	Zhodino-Yuzhnoe Zhodino (III)	0–2	FC Torpedo-BelAZ Zhodino (I)	Zhodino
17:00	Zavadskiy (yellow card) 26'; Minko (yellow card) 45'; Polyakov (yellow card) 83'	Report	Kirilenko 22', 66'; Veloso (yellow card) 32'	Stadium: Torpedo Stadium; Attendance: 3,150; Referee: Vitaly Poltarzhitsky

22 June 2022	FC Molodechno (II)	0–3	FC Slavia Mozyr (I)	Molodechno
17:30	Petrusevich (yellow card) 79'; Maslovskiy (yellow card) 80'	Report	Poloz 26'; Chukhley (yellow card) 39'; Zherdev (yellow card) 50' (goal) 64', 90+3'; Rutskiy (yellow card) 73'; Dros (yellow card) 77'	Stadium: City Stadium; Attendance: 750; Referee: Vadim Lenkovsky

22 June 2022	FC Lokomotiv Gomel (II)	0–1	FC Dynamo Brest (I)	Gomel
17:45	Kuchinskiy (yellow card) 77' (yellow-red card) 85'; Trofimchuk (yellow card) 80'; Zagvozdin (yellow card) 88'; Chuduk (yellow card) 90+2'; Sychev (yellow card) 90+3'	Report	Milyutin (yellow card) 31' (yellow-red card); Shcherba (yellow card) 41'; Yudchits 45'; Shamruk (yellow card) 81'	Stadium: Lokomotiv Stadium; Attendance: 320; Referee: Victor Shimusik

22 June 2022	Krumkachy Minsk (III)	0–3	FC Isloch Minsk Raion (I)	Minsk
18:00	Yatskevich (yellow card) 84'	Report	Ladutko 65' (o.g.); Sosah 81', 90+4'; D. Lisakovich (yellow card) 84'; Zimin (yellow card) 88'	Stadium: Stadyen RTsOP-BGU; Attendance: 770; Referee: Denis Tarasyuk

22 June 2022	FC Orsha (II)	1–3	FC Gomel (I)	Orsha
18:30	Shavlokhov (yellow card) 7'; Kabachevskiy 39'; Khinchagov (yellow card) 55'	Report	Miroshnikov (yellow card) 11'; Affi (red card) 16'; Yermakovich (yellow card) 48'; Adeola 57'; Makas 69' (pen.); Kuzmyanok 72'; Kuchinsky (yellow card) 90+1'	Stadium: City Stadium; Attendance: 1,200; Referee: Anton Lashuk

22 June 2022	FC Ostrovets (II)	1–2	FC Shakhtyor Soligorsk (I)	Astravyets
19:00	Klachkevich 90'	Report	Solovey 53'; Kozlovskiy 70'	Stadium: Stadyen ASK; Attendance: 1,050; Referee: Markov Dmitry

22 June 2022	Tekhnolog-BGUT Mogilev (III)	2–4	FC Belshina Bobruisk (I)	Mogilev
TBD	Katusov 33'; Khayko 47' (yellow card) 51'; Bubnov (yellow card) 47'; Pinegov (yellow card) 89'	Report	Kukharchik 36'; Gomza 37'; Nuriev 50'; Gurenko 90+2'	Stadium: Spartak Stadium; Attendance: 500; Referee: Sergey Chistov

22 June 2022	FC Volna Pinsk (II)	2–2 (a.e.t.) (4–5 p)	FC Dinamo Minsk (I)	Pinsk
20:00	Chizh (yellow card) 31'; Kovalevich (yellow card) 68'; Letsko (yellow card) 75'; Karpenya 39'; Shepelew 117'	Report	Vakulich (yellow card) 26'; Orinho (yellow card) 32'; Baradzin (yellow card) 53'; Latykhov 63', 119'; Bakić (yellow card) 107'	Stadium: Volna Stadium; Attendance: 2,940; Referee: Vitaliy Sevostyanik
	Penalties
	Shepelew (penalty scored); Volodko (penalty scored); Grechikha (penalty scored); Kovalevich (penalty missed); Gradoboyev (penalty scored); Tkachik (penalty missed)		(penalty scored) Bykov; (penalty scored) Latykhov; (penalty missed) Bakhar; (penalty scored) Bakić; (penalty scored) Lozhkin; (penalty scored) Vakulich

23 June 2022	Gazovik Vitebsk (II)	0–5	FC Dnepr Mogilev (I)	Vitebsk
17:30		Report	Volkov 14'; Klochkov (yellow card) 41'; Markaw 45'; Gusev 61', 90'; Krasnov 75'	Stadium: CSK Vitebskiy Iskusstvennoe pole Referee: Sergey Goryuutin

23 June 2022	FC Lida (II)	1–3	FC Arsenal Dzerzhinsk (I)	Lida
18:00	Vasilenko (yellow card) 41'; Karpov 50'; Sosnovskiy (yellow card) 57'; Rogach (yellow card) 90+2'	Report	Kiyko 42' (pen.); Lazarev 84' (o.g.); Matyash 88'	Stadium: Stadyen GSK Junatstva; Attendance: 350; Referee: Igor Shumilov

23 June 2022	FC Naftan Novopolotsk (II)	0–1	FC Minsk (I)	Novopolotsk
18:30		Report	Laval 73' (o.g.)	Stadium: Atlant Stadium; Attendance: 1,480; Referee: Alexey Kulbakov

== Round of 16 ==
The 16 winners from the second round, all from the Belarusbank Major League, compete in this stage. All teams from the Belarusian 1. Division and 2. Division have been eliminated. The draw was held on 28 June at the House of Football and matches are scheduled for 29 July.

Number of teams per tier still in competition
Premier League (1)	First League (2)	Second League (3)	Total
16 / 16	0 / 13	0 / 75	16 / 108

30 July 2022	FC Dynamo Brest (I)	1–1 (a.e.t.) (1–2 p)	FC Vitebsk (I)	Brest
18:00	Alyakhnovich 48'; Yasyukevich (yellow card) 52'; Kalpachuk (yellow card) 55'	Report	Sakovich (yellow card) 26'; Lisovsky 42'; Kostomarov (yellow card) 97'	Stadium: Stadyen DASK Brestski; Attendance: 2,314; Referee: Dmitriy Dolya

30 July 2022	FC Neman Grodno (I)	2–1	FC Arsenal Dzerzhinsk (I)	Grodno
19:00	Savitski 27'; Yakimov 53' (yellow card) 87'; Sadownichy (yellow card) 65'; Karpovich (yellow card) 68'; Lyahchylin (yellow card) 73'	Report	Kaplunov (red card) 25'; Rassadkin 74' (pen.); Kontsevoy (yellow card) 90+3'	Stadium: Neman Stadium; Attendance: 1,850; Referee: Sergey Stetsurin

30 July 2022	FC Torpedo-BelAZ Zhodino (I)	1–0	FC Isloch Minsk Raion (I)	Zhodino
20:00	Veloso (yellow card) 10'; Patsko 30'	Report	Sosah (yellow card) 26'; R. Lisakovich (yellow card) 80'; Nikiforenko (yellow card) 90+3'	Stadium: Stadyen Tarpedo; Attendance: 1,023; Referee: Vital Sevastsyanik

31 July 2022	FC Dnepr Mogilev (I)	0–2	FC Slavia Mozyr (I)	Mogilev
20:00	Nemirko (yellow card) 23'; Volkov (yellow card) 65'; Tereshchenko (yellow card) 76'; Firsov (yellow card) 86'	Report	Ignatenko (yellow card) 20'; Zherdev 32'; Potorocha (yellow card) 66'; Ovono (yellow card) 67'; Zemko 81' (yellow card) 90+3'; Bugulov (yellow card) 86'	Stadium: Stadyen Spartak; Attendance: 2,100; Referee: Sergey Gorayutin

18 November 2022	FC Gomel (I)	0–0 (5–6 p)	FC Belshina Bobruisk (I)	Gomel
20:00	Sedko (yellow card) 32'; Sokol (yellow card) 78'	Report	Vashkevich (yellow card) 8'; Chesnokov (yellow card) 33'; Troyakov (yellow card) 36'	Stadium: Central Stadium; Attendance: 550; Referee: Anton Lashuk
	Penalties
	Sedko (penalty scored); Kozlovskiy (penalty scored); Costrov (penalty scored); Anufriyev (penalty scored); Pantya (penalty scored); Potapenko (penalty missed)		(penalty scored) Aleksandrovich; (penalty scored) Velisevich; (penalty scored) Isah; (penalty scored) Zinovich; (penalty scored) Solanovich; (penalty scored) Chesnokov

26 November 2022	FC Slutsk (I)	1–0	FC Dinamo Minsk (I)	Slutsk
13:00	Kotov 14' (Bylinkin) (yellow card) 70'; Sachkovskiy (yellow card) 46'; Moussango (yellow card) 66'; Grechishko (yellow card) 86'		Sachywka (yellow card) 34'; Kislyak (yellow card) 39'; Grechikho (yellow card) 44'; Begunov (yellow card) 66'	Stadium: Slutskyĭ Hosudarstvennyĭ Kolledz͡h; Attendance: 650; Referee: Vital Sevostjyanik

26 November 2022	FC Minsk (I)	1–2	FC Shakhtyor Soligorsk (I)	Minsk
15:00	Pechura (yellow card) 41'; Pushnyakov (yellow card) 49' (goal) 80' (Dushevskiy)		Ahmedi 16'; Kovalevich 74' (Ahmedi) (yellow card) 76'	Stadium: FC Minsk Stadium; Attendance: 150; Referee: Vital Sevostjyanik

26 November 2022	FC Energetik-BGU Minsk (I)	0–2	FC BATE Borisov (I)	Minsk
18:00	Pashevich (yellow card) 43'; Lavrik (yellow card) 69'		Gromyko 38' (pen.); Bessmertny 57' (Gromyko); Oreshkevich (yellow card) 73'	Stadium: Dinamo Stadium; Attendance: 450; Referee: Viktor Shimusik

== Quarter-finals ==
The 8 winners from the second round, all from the Belarusbank Major League, compete in this stage.

Number of teams per tier still in competition
Premier League (1)	First League (2)	Second League (3)	Total
8 / 16	0 / 13	0 / 75	8 / 108

4 March 2023
14:00

FC Torpedo-BelAZ Zhodino (1)	2–1	FC Shakhtyor Soligorsk (1)
Chizh 14'; Shevchenko 90+4'		Skavysh 35' (pen.)

Torpedo Stadium, Zhodzina
11 March 2023
19:00

FC Shakhtyor Soligorsk (1)	1–0 (a.e.t.)	FC Torpedo-BelAZ Zhodino (1)
Kaplenko 31'
Penalties
Fessou (penalty scored); Shevchenko (penalty missed); Zabelin (penalty scored); Karpitsky (penalty scored)	3–5	(penalty scored) Pobudey; (penalty scored) Glushchenkov; (penalty scored) Myakish; (penalty scored) Shevchenko; (penalty scored) Premudrov

Stroitel Stadium, Soligorsk

2–2 on aggregate; FC Torpedo-BelAZ Zhodino won on penalties.

4 March 2023
16:00

FC Belshina Bobruisk (1)	0–5	FC BATE Borisov (1)
		Gromyko 12', 34'; Kontsevoy 29', 68'; Laptev 50'

Spartak Stadium, Bobruisk
11 March 2023
19:00

FC BATE Borisov (1)	5–0	FC Belshina Bobruisk (1)
Laptev 49', 51', 56'; Bane 82'; Volkov 84'

Borisov Arena, Barysaw

FC BATE Borisov won 10–0 on aggregate.

5 March 2023
14:00

FC Vitebsk (1)	0–0	FC Neman Grodno (1)

Vitebsky Central Sport Complex, Vitebsk
12 March 2023
16:30

FC Neman Grodno (1)	2–1	FC Vitebsk (1)
Sadownichy 81'; Gribovsky 90+5' (pen.)		Chervyakov 52'

Neman Stadium, Grodno

FC Neman Grodno won 2–1 on aggregate.

5 March 2023
16:00

FC Slavia Mozyr (1)	2–0	FC Slutsk (1)
Poloz 62'; Ryabykh 88'

Yunost Stadium, Mazyr
12 March 2023
14:00

FC Slutsk (1)	1–0	FC Slavia Mozyr (1)
Achapovsky 9'

City Stadium, Slutsk

FC Slavia Mozyr won 2–1 on aggregate.

== Semi-finals ==
The 4 winners from the second round, all from the Belarusbank Major League, compete in this stage. The draw was held on 14 April 2023 at the House of Football.

Number of teams per tier still in competition
Premier League (1)	First League (2)	Second League (3)	Total
4 / 16	0 / 13	0 / 75	4 / 108

18 April 2023
18:00

FC Slavia Mozyr (1)	0–1	FC Torpedo-BelAZ Zhodino (1)
Zaleski (yellow card) 62'	Report	Ovono (yellow card) 20'; Gorbachik 48'

Yunost Stadium, Mozyr
Attendance: 2,535
Referee: Viktor Shimusik
10 May 2023
19:00

FC Torpedo-BelAZ Zhodino (1)	0–0	FC Slavia Mozyr (1)
Patsko (yellow card) 28'	Report

Torpedo Stadium, Zhodino
Attendance: 1,121
Referee: Igor Shumilov

FC Torpedo-BelAZ Zhodino won 1–0 on aggregate;

19 April 2023
18:00

FC Neman Grodno (1)	1–1	FC BATE Borisov (1)
Kazlow (yellow card) 29'; Parkhomenko (yellow card) 45'; Yablonsky (yellow card) 53'; Volkov 58' (o.g.)	Report	Grechiko (yellow card) 10'; Volkov (yellow card) 38'; Shestyuk 90+1'

Neman Stadium, Grodno
Attendance: 1,550
Referee: Igor Shumilov
10 May 2023
19:00

FC BATE Borisov (1)	0–0 (a.e.t.)	FC Neman Grodno (1)
Bane (yellow card) 42'; Jimoh (yellow card) 58'	Report	Suchkow (yellow card) 55'; Yablonsky (yellow card) 95'
Penalties
Volkov (penalty scored); Gromyko (penalty scored); Antilevsky (penalty scored); Shestyuk (penalty scored); Volkaw (penalty scored)	5–4	Kazlow (penalty scored); Paparyha (penalty scored); Pantya (penalty scored); Yablonsky (penalty scored); Gribovsky (penalty missed)

Haradski Stadium, Barysaw
Attendance: 2,093
Referee: Sergei Stetsurin

1–1 on aggregate; FC BATE Borisov advances 5–4 on penalties.

== Final ==
The 2 semi-final winners, both from the Belarusbank Major League, compete in this stage.

Number of teams per tier still in competition
Premier League (1)	First League (2)	Second League (3)	Total
2 / 16	0 / 13	0 / 75	2 / 108

28 May 2023
19:00 UTC+3

FC BATE Borisov (1)	0–2	FC Torpedo-BelAZ Zhodino (1)
Martynaw (yellow card) 56'; Volkov (yellow card) 90+3'	Report	Gorbachik 17'; Pobudey (yellow card) 42'; Myakish (yellow card) 71'; Shevchenko (yellow card) 73'; Ovono 80' (yellow card) 90+6'; Glushchenkov (yellow card) 89'

Dinamo Stadium, Minsk
Attendance: 21,058
Referee: Aleksei Kulbakov
