= 2024 Belarusian Super Cup =

Torpedo-BelAZ Zhodino	Dinamo Minsk
0	0
- Torpedo-BelAZ won 4–3 on penalties
- Date: 2 March 2024
- Venue: Shakhtyor Stadium, Soligorsk
- Referee: Amin Kurgheli
- Attendance: 1,911

The 2024 Belarusian Super Cup was held on 2 March 2024 between the 2023 Belarusian Premier League champions Dinamo Minsk and the 2022–23 Belarusian Cup winners Torpedo-BelAZ Zhodino. Torpedo-BelAZ Zhodino won the match 4–3 on penalties and won the trophy for the first time.

== Match details ==
2 March 2024
17:00 UTC+3

Torpedo-BelAZ Zhodino	0–0	Dinamo Minsk
	Report
Penalties
Pobudey (penalty scored); Zalesky (penalty scored); Myakish (penalty missed); Rutsky (penalty scored); Premudrov (penalty scored)	4–3	(penalty scored) Melnichenko; (penalty scored) Zherdev; (penalty scored) Pigas; (penalty missed) Demchenko; (penalty missed) Adeola

Shakhtyor Stadium, Soligorsk
Attendance: 1,911
Referee: Amin Kurgkheli (Gomel)

TORPEDO-BELAZ:
GK	1	(Belarus) Yevgeniy Abramovich	(substituted off) 90+1'
RB	18	(Belarus) Nikita Patsko	(substituted off) 75'
CB	6	(Belarus) Kirill Premudrov (c)
CB	13	(Belarus) Aleksey Zalesky
CB	11	(Belarus) Denis Levitsky
LB	30	(Belarus) Vadim Pobudey
CM	97	(Belarus) Maksim Myakish
CM	10	(Belarus) Dmitry Lisakovich	(substituted off) 75'
RW	17	(Belarus) Anton Kavalyow	(substituted off) 64'
LW	55	(Belarus) Aleksandr Ksenofontov	(substituted off) 75'
CF	51	(Belarus) Denis Laptev	(substituted off) 64'
Substitutes:
GK	25	(Belarus) Timofey Yurasov	(substituted on) 90+1'
DF	4	(Belarus) Zakhar Baranok
DF	5	(Belarus) Ihar Burko
FW	7	(Moldova) Andrei Cobeț	(substituted on) 64'
FW	15	(Belarus) Maksim Skavysh	(substituted on) 64'
MF	16	(Belarus) Yevgeny Zemko
MF	19	(Belarus) Ilya Rutsky	(substituted on) 75'
DF	20	(Belarus) Grigoriy Martyanov
FW	21	(Belarus) Timofey Sharkovskiy	(substituted on) 75'
MF	27	(Belarus) Danila Nechayev
MF	44	(Belarus) Aleksey Butarevich	(substituted on) 75'
Manager:
(Belarus) Dmitry Molosh

DINAMO:
GK	21	(Belarus) Fedor Lapoukhov
RB	2	(Belarus) Vadim Pigas
CB	3	(Belarus) Maksim Shvyatsow
CB	6	(Belarus) Sergey Politevich (c)	(yellow card) 75'
LB	18	(Belarus) Aleksandr Mikhalenko
DM	8	(Belarus) Aleksandr Selyava	(yellow card) 36'
RM	19	(Belarus) Dmitry Podstrelov		(substituted off) 64'
CM	7	(Belarus) Artyom Bykov		(substituted off) 81'
CM	88	(Belarus) Nikita Demchenko	(yellow card) 71'
LM	47	(Belarus) Ilya Chernyak		(substituted off) 64'
CF	9	(Russia) Pavel Melyoshin		(substituted off) 81'
Substitutes:
GK	49	(Belarus) Artem Karatay
DF	4	(Belarus) Alyaksey Hawrylovich
FW	10	(Belarus) Uladzimir Khvashchynski
MF	11	(Belarus) Gleb Zherdev		(substituted on) 81'
FW	14	(Nigeria) Raymond Adeola		(substituted on) 64'
DF	20	(Belarus) Alyaksandr Sachywka
MF	37	(Belarus) Vladislav Krolik
DF	67	(Belarus) Roman Begunov
MF	80	(Russia) Igor Shkolik
MF	81	(Belarus) Trofim Melnichenko		(substituted on) 64'
FW	97	(Belarus) Vasiliy Chernyavskiy
MF	99	(Belarus) Artem Sokolovskiy		(substituted on) 81'
Manager:
(Belarus) Vadim Skripchenko

== See also ==
- 2023 Belarusian Premier League
- 2022–23 Belarusian Cup
