= Artur Kuzmich =

Belarusian footballer

Personal information
- Date of birth: 14 January 2003 (age 23)
- Place of birth: Minsk, Belarus
- Height: 1.75 m (5 ft 9 in)
- Position: Midfielder

Youth career
- 2019–2021: Minsk

Senior career*
Years	Team	Apps	(Gls)
2021–2024	Minsk	4	(0)
2022	→ Volna Pinsk (loan)	9	(0)
2023	→ Maxline Vitebsk (loan)	23	(2)
2024	→ Smorgon (loan)	1	(0)
2025	Dnepr Rogachev	3	(0)
- * Club domestic league appearances and goals as of 7 April 2026

Artur Kuzmich (Belarusian: Артур Кузьміч; Russian: Артур Кузьмич; born 14 January 2003) is a Belarusian footballer.
