= Lavric =

Lavric, Lavrik or Lavrič is a gender-neutral Slavic surname that may refer to the following notable people:

- Aleksey Lavrik (born 2000), Belarusian football player, son of Andrei
- Ana Roner Lavrič (1869–1957), Slovenian organist and music teacher
- Andrei Lavrik (born 1974), Belarusian football official, coach and a former player
- Elena Mirela Lavric (born 1991), Romanian runner
- Florica Lavric (1962–2014), Romanian rower
- Paula Lavric (born 1990), Romanian writer
- Sorin Lavric (born 1967), Romanian writer
- Karel Lavrič (1818–1876), Slovene politician
- Klemen Lavrič (born 1981), Slovene football striker
- Lucian Lavric (born 2005), Moldovan basketball player
