= Poloz =

Poloz is a surname. Notable people with the surname include:

- Dmitry Poloz (born 1991), Russian footballer
- Dušan Poloz (born 1965), Slovak handball coach
- Mykhailo Poloz (1891–1937), Ukrainian politician, diplomat, and statesman
- Stephen Poloz (born 1955), Canadian banker
- Vladislav Poloz (born 2001), Belarusian footballer
