= Bogdan Sadovskiy =

Belarusian footballer

Personal information
- Date of birth: 1 August 1999 (age 27)
- Place of birth: Mozyr, Belarus
- Height: 1.69 m (5 ft 7 in)
- Position: Forward

Youth career
- 2015–2017: Slavia Mozyr
- 2017–2018: Dinamo Brest

Senior career*
Years	Team	Apps	(Gls)
2018	Dinamo Brest	2	(0)
2018	Energetik-BGU Minsk	0	(0)
2019	Smorgon	15	(1)
2020	Rukh Brest	10	(0)
2021	Smorgon	0	(0)
- * Club domestic league appearances and goals as of 31 December 2021

Bogdan Sadovskiy (Belarusian: Багдан Садоўскі; Russian: Богдан Садовский; born 1 August 1999) is a Belarusian professional footballer.
