= Yaroslav Yarotsky =

Belarusian footballer

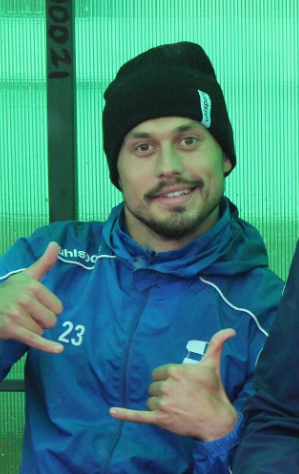

Personal information
- Date of birth: 28 March 1996 (age 30)
- Place of birth: Grodno, Belarus
- Height: 1.73 m (5 ft 8 in)
- Position: Midfielder

Team information
- Current team: Smorgon
- Number: 25

Youth career
- 2012–2013: Dinamo Minsk

Senior career*
Years	Team	Apps	(Gls)
2013–2018	Dinamo Minsk	43	(3)
2016–2017	→ Neman Grodno (loan)	19	(2)
2018	→ Smolevichi (loan)	8	(0)
2019–2021	Minsk	69	(4)
2022	Vitebsk	6	(1)
2022–2026	Slutsk	60	(1)
2026–	Smorgon	5	(0)

International career
2011–2012	Belarus U17	6	(0)
2014–2017	Belarus U21	27	(3)
- * Club domestic league appearances and goals as of 30 August 2026

Yaroslav Yarotsky (Belarusian: Яраслаў Яроцкi; Russian: Ярослав Яроцкий; born 28 March 1996) is a Belarusian professional football player currently playing for Smorgon.
