= Andriy Stryzheus =

Ukrainian footballer

Personal information
- Full name: Andriy Svyatoslavovych Stryzheus
- Date of birth: 18 August 1995 (age 31)
- Place of birth: Lutsk, Ukraine
- Height: 1.82 m (5 ft 11 1/2 in)
- Position: Midfielder

Team information
- Current team: Osipovichi

Youth career
- 2007–2012: Volyn Lutsk

Senior career*
Years	Team	Apps	(Gls)
2012–2015	Volyn Lutsk	0	(0)
2015–2016	Dynamo Brest	1	(0)
2017	Krumkachy Minsk	0	(0)
2017	Granit Mikashevichi	14	(1)
2018	Smorgon	6	(0)
2019	Slonim-2017	8	(0)
2019	Volyn Lutsk	1	(0)
2020	Granit Mikashevichi	4	(0)
2021	Smolevichi	16	(4)
2022	Osipovichi	20	(0)
2023	Krumkachy Minsk	6	(1)
2024–	Osipovichi		
- * Club domestic league appearances and goals as of 31 December 2023

Andriy Stryzheus (Ukrainian: Андрій Святославович Стрижеус; born 18 August 1995) is a professional Ukrainian football midfielder who plays for Osipovichi. He is a graduate of Volyn Lutsk youth system.
