= Anton Kavalyow =

Belarusian footballer (born 2000)

Personal information
- Date of birth: 19 April 2000 (age 26)
- Place of birth: Byalynichy, Mogilev Raion, Belarus
- Height: 1.78 m (5 ft 10 in)
- Position: Midfielder

Team information
- Current team: Fakel Voronezh
- Number: 17

Youth career
- 2017–2019: Shakhtyor Soligorsk

Senior career*
Years	Team	Apps	(Gls)
2019–2021	Shakhtyor Soligorsk	1	(0)
2020	→ Tukums 2000 (loan)	0	(0)
2021	→ Isloch Minsk Raion (loan)	25	(0)
2022–2024	Torpedo-BelAZ Zhodino	72	(7)
2025–	Fakel Voronezh	29	(0)
2026	→ BATE Borisov (loan)	9	(0)

International career^{‡}
2021	Belarus U21	2	(0)
2026–	Belarus	5	(0)
- * Club domestic league appearances and goals as of 21 November 2026 ‡ National team caps and goals as of 15 November 2026

Anton Kavalyow (Belarusian: Антон Кавалёў; Russian: Антон Ковалёв; born 19 April 2000) is a Belarusian professional footballer who plays for Russian club Fakel Voronezh and the Belarus national team.

== Club career ==
On 4 December 2024, Kavalyow signed a long-term contract with Russian Premier League club Fakel Voronezh.

== International career ==
On 26 September 2026, Kavalyow made his debut for the Belarus national team in a 2026–27 UEFA Nations League C game against Albania.

== Personal life ==
His older brother Yury Kavalyow is also professional footballer and Belarus international player.

== Career statistics ==
As of 21 November 2026

Club	Season	League			Cup		Continental		Other		Total	
Club	Season	Division	Apps	Goals	Apps	Goals	Apps	Goals	Apps	Goals	Apps	Goals
Shakhtyor Soligorsk	2019	Belarusian Premier League	1	0	–		–		–		1	0
Tukums 2000 (loan)	2020	Latvian Higher League	0	0	0	0	–		–		0	0
Isloch Minsk Raion (loan)	2021	Belarusian Premier League	25	0	6	0	–		–		31	0
Torpedo-BelAZ Zhodino	2022	Belarusian Premier League	27	3	3	0	–		–		30	3
Torpedo-BelAZ Zhodino	2023	Belarusian Premier League	16	2	6	0	2 (Note: Appearances in the UEFA Conference League)	0	–		24	2
Torpedo-BelAZ Zhodino	2024	Belarusian Premier League	29	2	6	0	2	0	1 (Note: Appearances in the Belarusian Super Cup)	0	38	2
Torpedo-BelAZ Zhodino	Total		72	7	15	0	4	0	1	0	92	7
Fakel Voronezh	2024–25	Russian Premier League	5	0	0	0	–		–		5	0
Fakel Voronezh	2025–26	Russian First League	10	0	3	0	–		–		13	0
Fakel Voronezh	2026–27	Russian Premier League	14	0	5	1	–		–		19	1
Fakel Voronezh	Total		29	0	8	1	0	0	0	0	37	1
BATE Borisov (loan)	2026	Belarusian Premier League	9	0	5	0	0	0	–		14	0
Career total			136	7	34	1	4	0	1	0	175	8

== Honours ==
Torpedo-BelAZ

- Belarusian Cup: 2022–23
- Belarusian Super Cup: 2024

BATE Borisov

- Belarusian Cup: 2025–26
