= Anton Shepelew =

Belarusian footballer

Personal information
- Date of birth: 8 November 1989 (age 37)
- Place of birth: Mogilev, Belarusian SSR, Soviet Union
- Height: 1.90 m (6 ft 3 in)
- Position: Defender

Team information
- Current team: Orsha
- Number: 77

Youth career
- 2007–2008: Dnepr Mogilev

Senior career*
| Years | Team | Apps | (Gls) |
| 2007–2011 | Dnepr Mogilev | 4 | (0) |
| 2009–2010 | → Vedrich-97 Rechitsa (loan) | 40 | (0) |
| 2012 | Smorgon | 24 | (2) |
| 2013–2014 | Khimik Svetlogorsk | 40 | (2) |
| 2014–2015 | Dnepr Mogilev | 32 | (2) |
| 2016 | Dinamo Brest | 15 | (0) |
| 2016–2018 | Dnepr Mogilev | 48 | (6) |
| 2019 | Smolevichi | 7 | (1) |
| 2019 | Lokomotiv Gomel | 14 | (0) |
| 2020–2021 | Dnepr Mogilev | 41 | (3) |
| 2022–2024 | Volna Pinsk | 57 | (8) |
| 2024– | Orsha | 15 | (2) |
- * Club domestic league appearances and goals as of 10 December 2024

Anton Shepelew (Belarusian: Антон Шэпелеў; Russian: Антон Шепелев; born 8 November 1989) is a Belarusian professional football player currently playing for Orsha.

== Honours ==
Dinamo Brest

- Belarusian Cup winner: 2016–17
