= Petr Kazantsev =

Belarusian footballer

Personal information
- Date of birth: 22 April 1998 (age 28)
- Place of birth: Minsk, Belarus
- Height: 1.88 m (6 ft 2 in)
- Position: Defender

Team information
- Current team: Molodechno
- Number: 14

Youth career
- 2012–2017: Minsk

Senior career*
Years	Team	Apps	(Gls)
2017–2019	Minsk	5	(0)
2018	→ Belshina Bobruisk (loan)	7	(0)
2019–2020	Smorgon	33	(3)
2021	Lida	27	(1)
2022–	Molodechno	39	(1)

International career
2015	Belarus U17	3	(0)
2016–2017	Belarus U19	3	(0)
2018	Belarus U21	2	(0)
- * Club domestic league appearances and goals as of 31 December 2023

Petr Kazantsev (Belarusian: Пётр Казанцаў; Russian: Пётр Казанцев; born 22 April 1998) is a Belarusian professional footballer who plays for Molodechno.
