= Andrey Pyshnik =

Belarusian footballer (born 1968)

Personal information
- Date of birth: 1 February 1968 (age 58)
- Place of birth: Minsk, Belarusian SSR
- Position: Midfielder

Team information
- Current team: Osipovichi (manager)

Youth career
- Dinamo Minsk

Senior career*
Years	Team	Apps	(Gls)
1988	Alga Frunze	11	(0)
1989	Uralets Uralsk	5	(0)
1989–1990	KIM Vitebsk	41	(2)
1991	Alga Frunze		
1992–1994	Torpedo Minsk	61	(2)
1995–1996	Ataka-Aura Minsk	15	(0)
1996	MPKC Mozyr	8	(0)
1997	Torpedo Minsk	1	(0)
1997–2001	RUOR Minsk	46	(5)

Managerial career
- 2002–2003: RUOR Minsk (assistant)
- 2003–2012: Dinamo Minsk (coach)
- 2013–2014: Minsk (reserves)
- 2013: Belarus U19
- 2014–2015: Minsk
- 2015–2016: Minsk (youth)
- 2016–2017: Torpedo Minsk
- 2021–2025: FC Minsk (women)
- 2026–: Osipovichi
- * Club domestic league appearances and goals

Andrey Pyshnik (Belarusian: Андрэй Пышнік; Russian: Андрей Пышник; born 1 February 1968) is a former Belarusian football coach and former player who is the head coach of Osipovichi. From summer 2016 till the end of 2017 he was the head coach of Torpedo Minsk. From 2021 till 2025 he was the head coach of FC Minsk (women).

== Honours ==
MPKC Mozyr

- Belarusian Premier League champion: 1996
