= Anton Susha =

Belarusian footballer

Personal information
- Date of birth: 25 January 2000 (age 26)
- Place of birth: Chervyen, Minsk Oblast, Belarus
- Height: 1.81 m (5 ft 11 in)
- Position: Midfielder

Team information
- Current team: Volna Pinsk
- Number: 21

Youth career
- 2017–2019: Dinamo Minsk

Senior career*
Years	Team	Apps	(Gls)
2019–2022	Dinamo Minsk	1	(0)
2020	→ Gomel (loan)	16	(0)
2021	→ Gomel (loan)	7	(0)
2022	→ Arsenal Dzerzhinsk (loan)	3	(0)
2022	→ Slutsk (loan)	5	(0)
2024–2025	Naftan Novopolotsk	11	(0)
2026–	Volna Pinsk	14	(0)

International career^{‡}
2019–2021	Belarus U21	3	(0)
- * Club domestic league appearances and goals as of 6 July 2026 ‡ National team caps and goals as of 29 March 2021

Anton Susha (Belarusian: Антон Суша; Russian: Антон Суша; born 25 January 2000) is a Belarusian professional footballer who plays for Volna Pinsk.

== Honours ==
Gomel

- Belarusian Cup winner: 2021–22
