= Artem Tatarevich =

Belarusian footballer

Personal information
- Date of birth: 28 January 1992 (age 34)
- Place of birth: Pinsk, Brest Oblast, Belarus
- Height: 1.83 m (6 ft 0 in)
- Position: Midfielder

Team information
- Current team: Volna Pinsk
- Number: 4

Youth career
- 2009–2010: Volna Pinsk

Senior career*
Years	Team	Apps	(Gls)
2009–2013	Volna Pinsk	59	(0)
2013–2016	Dinamo Brest	36	(0)
2017–	Volna Pinsk	112	(3)
- * Club domestic league appearances and goals as of 31 December 2023

Artem Tatarevich (Belarusian: Арцём Татарэвiч; Russian: Артём Татаревич; born 28 January 1992) is a Belarusian professional footballer who plays for Volna Pinsk.

== Honours ==
Dinamo Brest

- Belarusian Cup winner: 2016–17
