= Yevgeniy Yelezarenko =

Belarusian footballer

Personal information
- Date of birth: 4 July 1993 (age 33)
- Place of birth: Osipovichi, Mogilev Oblast, Belarus
- Height: 1.75 m (5 ft 9 in)
- Position: Midfielder

Team information
- Current team: Osipovichi
- Number: 21

Youth career
- 2009–2011: Dinamo Minsk

Senior career*
Years	Team	Apps	(Gls)
2011	Dinamo-2 Minsk	25	(4)
2012–2015	Naftan Novopolotsk	72	(1)
2016–2017	Shakhtyor Soligorsk	20	(2)
2017	→ Gomel (loan)	20	(1)
2018	Slutsk	3	(0)
2018–2019	Torpedo Minsk	23	(0)
2019	Lida	13	(2)
2020	Dnepr Mogilev	24	(8)
2021	Naftan Novopolotsk	3	(0)
2021	Volna Pinsk	3	(0)
2022–2023	Osipovichi	29	(3)
2023	Kolos Chervyen	9	(2)
2024	Krumkachy Minsk	21	(8)
2025–	Osipovichi	29	(3)

International career
2014	Belarus U21	10	(0)
- * Club domestic league appearances and goals as of 1 December 2025

Yevgeniy Yelezarenko (Belarusian: Яўген Ялязаранка; Russian: Евгений Елезаренко; born 4 July 1993) is a Belarusian footballer who plays for Osipovichi.
