= Pavel Lyutsko =

Belarusian footballer

Personal information
- Date of birth: 1 July 1987 (age 39)
- Place of birth: Minsk, Belarusian SSR
- Height: 1.72 m (5 ft 7 1/2 in)
- Position: Defender

Youth career
- RUOR Minsk

Senior career*
Years	Team	Apps	(Gls)
2003	RUOR Minsk	2	(0)
2004–2005	Dinamo Minsk	0	(0)
2005–2007	Torpedo Zhodino	6	(0)
2007–2010	Vitebsk	35	(0)
2011	SKVICH Minsk	20	(0)
2012–2014	Granit Mikashevichi	51	(1)
2015	Gomel	0	(0)
2016	Smorgon	19	(0)
2017	Belshina Bobruisk	12	(0)
2017–2018	Smorgon	15	(0)
- * Club domestic league appearances and goals as of 31 July 2018

Pavel Lyutsko (Belarusian: Павел Люцько; Russian: Павел Лютько; born 1 July 1987) is a Belarusian former professional footballer.
