= Maksim Omelyanchuk =

Belarusian footballer

Personal information
- Date of birth: 5 September 2003 (age 23)
- Place of birth: Kyiv, Ukraine
- Position: Midfielder

Youth career
- 2017–2020: Minsk

Senior career*
Years	Team	Apps	(Gls)
2021–2023	Energetik-BGU Minsk	62	(1)
2024	Slutsk	11	(0)
2024	Maxline Vitebsk	14	(0)
- * Club domestic league appearances and goals as of 6 April 2026

Maksim Omelyanchuk (Belarusian: Максім Амельянчук; Russian: Максим Омельянчук; born 5 September 2003) is a Belarusian professional footballer.

He's a son of former Belarus international footballer Sergey Omelyanchuk.
