= Aleksey Vakulich =

Belarusian footballer

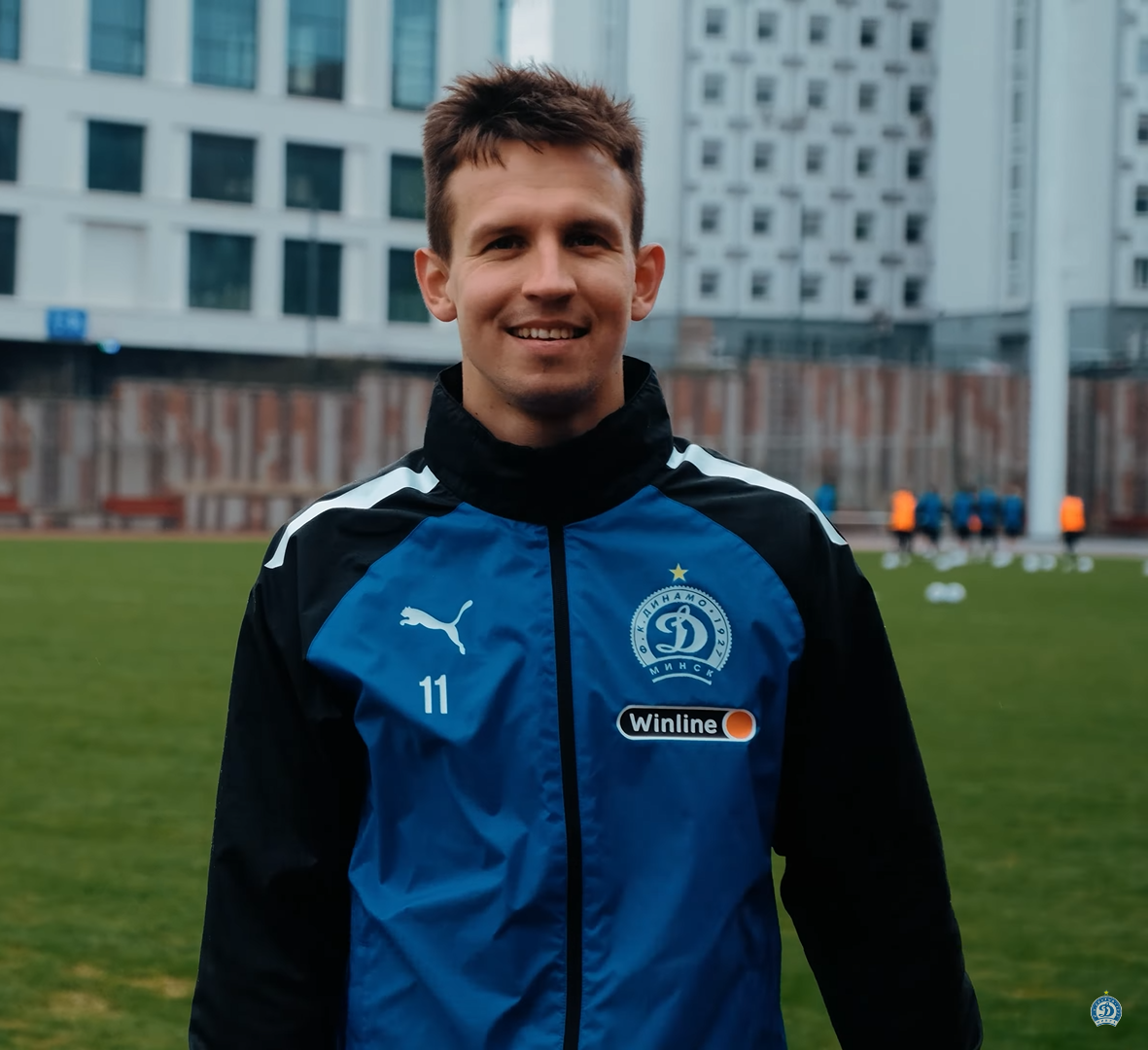

Personal information
- Date of birth: 24 June 1998 (age 28)
- Place of birth: Ivatsevichy, Brest Oblast, Belarus
- Height: 1.79 m (5 ft 10 1/2 in)
- Position: Left-back

Team information
- Current team: Dinamo Minsk
- Number: 24

Youth career
- 2014–2015: Neman Grodno

Senior career*
Years	Team	Apps	(Gls)
2016–2017	Minsk	1	(0)
2018	Energetik-BGU Minsk	12	(0)
2018	Baranovichi	12	(3)
2019–2020	Smolevichi	40	(6)
2020–2021	Veles Moscow	28	(0)
2021	Rukh Brest	9	(0)
2022–2023	Dinamo Minsk	45	(0)
2024	Arsenal Tula	5	(0)
2024	→ Dinamo Brest (loan)	12	(0)
2025–	Dinamo Minsk	29	(2)

International career
2016	Belarus U19	2	(0)
- * Club domestic league appearances and goals as of 4 July 2026

Aleksey Vakulich (Belarusian: Аляксей Вакуліч; Russian: Алексей Вакулич; born 24 June 1998) is a Belarusian professional footballer who plays as a left-back for Dinamo Minsk.
