= Azam Radzhabov =

Belarusian footballer (born 1993)

Azam Talbievich Radzhabov
Personal information
- Date of birth: 21 January 1993 (age 33)
- Place of birth: Roghun, Tajikistan
- Height: 1.77 m (5 ft 9 1/2 in)
- Position: Midfielder

Team information
- Current team: Volna Pinsk
- Number: 7

Youth career
- 2007–2011: Vitebsk
- 2011–2013: Dynamo Kyiv

Senior career*
Years	Team	Apps	(Gls)
2013–2014	Gomel	14	(0)
2014–2017	Vitebsk	36	(4)
2017	→ Orsha (loan)	11	(2)
2018–2019	Naftan Novopolotsk	42	(7)
2020–2024	Volna Pinsk	91	(2)
2024–2025	Lida	47	(2)
2026–	Volna Pinsk	13	(0)

International career^{‡}
2011	Belarus U19		
2012–2013	Belarus U21	14	(0)
- * Club domestic league appearances and goals as of 6 July 2026 ‡ National team caps and goals as of 5 November 2014

Azam Talbievich Radzhabov (Belarusian: Азам Раджабаў; Russian: Азам Раджабов; born 21 January 1993) is a Belarusian professional footballer who plays for Volna Pinsk.

== Career ==
Before joining Gomel, he spent two years playing for reserve and youth teams in Dynamo Kyiv, but didn't have a chance for debut in a senior team.
