= Daniil Dushevskiy =

Belarusian footballer

Personal information
- Full name: Daniil Dmitrievich Dushevskiy
- Date of birth: 1 March 2004 (age 22)
- Place of birth: Minsk, Belarus
- Height: 1.85 m (6 ft 1 in)
- Position: Midfielder

Team information
- Current team: Dinamo Minsk
- Number: 5

Youth career
- 2019–2021: Minsk

Senior career*
Years	Team	Apps	(Gls)
2021–2024	Minsk	66	(7)
2024–2025	OFK Beograd	1	(0)
2025	→ Mladost Novi Sad (loan)	17	(0)
2025–2026	Leningradets Leningrad Oblast	27	(1)
2026–	Dinamo Minsk	3	(1)

International career^{‡}
2020	Belarus U16	3	(0)
2021–2022	Belarus U19	7	(0)
2022–	Belarus U21	26	(1)
- * Club domestic league appearances and goals as of 2 September 2026 ‡ National team caps and goals as of 31 March 2026

Daniil Dmitrievich Dushevskiy (Belarusian: Данііл Дзмітрыевіч Душэўскі; Russian: Даниил Дмитриевич Душевский; born 1 March 2004) is a Belarusian footballer who plays for Belarusian Premier League club Dinamo Minsk.

== Club career ==
=== Minsk ===
==== Beginning of the career ====
Dushevskiy is a graduate player of the football academy of the Minsk, which he joined at the age of 6, his first coach was Alexander Ivanovich Struk. He went through all the youth and junior teams in the club's structure. At the end of 2019, as part of the youth team, he became the champion of the country, later receiving the award for the best footballer of the year in the under-16 age category. The following season in 2020, he went to play for the club's reserve team. At the end of October 2021, he began to catch up with the club's main team. He made his debut for the club on October 31, 2021, in a match against Shakhtyor Soligorsk, coming on as a substitute in the 74th minute. In his debut season, he played 3 matches for the club.

==== Season 2022 ====
At the beginning of 2022, he fully joined the club's main team, with which he began to prepare for the new season. He played his first match of the new season on March 18, 2022, against Dinamo Minsk, entering the field in the starting lineup. He scored his first effective action for the club on April 9, 2022, in a match against Torpedo-BelAZ Zhodino, and he giving an assist. He scored his debut goal for the club in the next match on April 15, 2022, against Slutsk. Based on the results of May 2022, he was recognized as the best player of the club. Throughout the season, he was one of the key players of the club, scoring 2 goals and making 4 assists in all tournaments. At the end of the season, he and the club finished the championship in sixth place.

==== Season 2023 ====
In January 2023, he and the club began preparing for the new season. In February 2023, he suffered a serious injury during an off-season friendly, which is why he was out of the club's possession. By the very beginning of the season, he had fully recovered from the injury. He was appointed captain of the first club. He played his first match of the new season on March 17, 2023, against MPKC Mozyr, entering the field in the starting lineup and scoring an assist. He scored his first goal of the season on April 8, 2023, in a match against BATE Borisov. In April 2023, he was included in the list of the most promising players under 20, where he took 15th place among defensive midfielders. In May 2023, according to sources, Dinamo Minsk showed great interest in Dushevskiy. He remained a key player in the club throughout the season, scoring 4 goals and making 2 assists. At the end of the season, he and the club finished the championship in ninth place.

==== Season 2024 ====
In December 2023, information appeared that there was great interest in Dushevskiy from other clubs. He started the new season for the club on March 3, 2024, with a quarterfinal match of the Belarusian Cup against Neman Grodno. He played his first match in the championship on March 16, 2024, against BATE Borisov, entering the field in the starting lineup. He scored his first goal for the club on June 22, 2024, in a match against Arsenal Dzerzhinsk. Throughout the first half of the season, he played for the club as one of the key players, scoring his only goal. In July 2024, he left the Minsk club, for which he managed to score 7 goals and 6 assists in all tournaments throughout the seasons.

=== OFK Beograd ===
==== Season 2024/25 (loan at Mladost Novi Sad) ====
In July 2024, he moved to the Serbian SuperLiga club OFK Beograd, signing a two-year contract. He started the season on the bench, making his debut for the club on 19 October 2024 in a match against Spartak Subotica, coming on as a substitute in the 81st minute. At the end of February 2024, it was reported that the player could go on loan due to lack of playing practice. In February 2025, he joined the Serbian First League club Mladost GAT on loan until the end of the season. He made his debut for the club on 22 February 2025 in a match against Sloboda Užice, coming on as a substitute at the beginning of the second half. He scored his first goal for the club on 9 March 2025 in a match against GFK Dubočica, providing an assist. At the end of the season, he and the club finished the main part of the championship in fourth place, going to the play-off round for promotion, where they lost to the club Napredak Kruševac on aggregate. Throughout the season, he played for the club as one of the main players, having distinguished himself with 3 assists.

== International career ==
In August 2021, he was called up to the Belarus U19 national team. He made his debut for the national team in early September 2021 in friendly matches against Russia U19. He also took part in the qualifying matches for the 2021 European U19 Championship, where he played one game against the Hungary U19 national team.

In November 2022, he received a call-up to the Belarus U21 national team. He made his debut for the national team on 16 November 2022 in a match against Iran U21. He scored his debut goal for the national team on 5 June 2024 in a friendly match against Malta U21.

== Honours ==
=== Individual ===
- Star Ball 2019: Best Footballer of the Year (U16)
