= Mikhail Kazlow =

Belarusian footballer

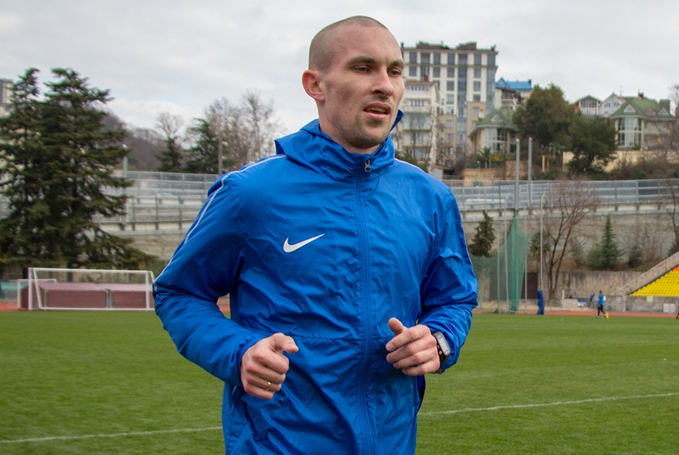
- Kazlow in 2020

Personal information
- Date of birth: 12 February 1990 (age 36)
- Place of birth: Mogilev, Belarusian SSR, Soviet Union
- Height: 1.77 m (5 ft 10 in)
- Position: Defender

Team information
- Current team: Neman Grodno
- Number: 47

Youth career
- 2008–2010: Dnepr Mogilev

Senior career*
Years	Team	Apps	(Gls)
2010–2014	Dnepr Mogilev	132	(1)
2015–2019	Vitebsk	116	(5)
2020–2022	Dinamo Minsk	67	(2)
2023–	Neman Grodno	88	(1)

International career
2011	Belarus U21	1	(0)
- * Club domestic league appearances and goals as of 3 July 2026

Mikhail Kazlow (Belarusian: Міхаіл Міхайлавіч Казлоў; Russian: Михаил Михайлович Козлов; born 12 February 1990) is a Belarusian professional football player currently playing for Neman Grodno.
