= Kirill Polkhovskiy =

Belarusian footballer

Personal information
- Date of birth: 9 January 2002 (age 24)
- Place of birth: Pinsk, Brest Oblast, Belarus
- Position: Forward

Team information
- Current team: Volna Pinsk
- Number: 17

Youth career
- 2017–2018: Shakhtyor Soligorsk
- 2018–2019: Dinamo Brest

Senior career*
Years	Team	Apps	(Gls)
2019–2020	Dinamo Brest	2	(0)
2020	→ Dinamo Malorita (loan)	21	(5)
2022	Malorita	3	(5)
2022–	Volna Pinsk	116	(13)
- * Club domestic league appearances and goals as of 6 July 2026

Kirill Polkhovskiy (Belarusian: Кірыл Палхоўскі; Russian: Кирилл Полховский; born 9 January 2002) is a Belarusian professional footballer who plays for Volna Pinsk.

== Honours ==
Dinamo Brest

- Belarusian Premier League champion: 2019
