= Roman Gribovsky =

Belarusian footballer

Personal information
- Full name: Roman Andreyevich Gribovsky
- Date of birth: 17 July 1995 (age 31)
- Place of birth: Mogilev, Belarus
- Height: 1.83 m (6 ft 0 in)
- Position: Forward

Team information
- Current team: Smorgon
- Number: 18

Youth career
- 2011–2014: Belshina Bobruisk

Senior career*
Years	Team	Apps	(Gls)
2014–2015	Belshina Bobruisk	7	(0)
2016	Dnepr Mogilev	23	(2)
2017	Lida	27	(8)
2018	Luch Minsk	26	(5)
2019	Dnyapro Mogilev	17	(6)
2020	Minsk	27	(6)
2021–2023	Neman Grodno	38	(9)
2024	Slavia Mozyr	10	(0)
2024	Dnepr Mogilev	3	(0)
2025–2026	Lida	36	(11)
2026–	Smorgon	3	(0)

International career
2011–2012	Belarus U17	5	(1)
- * Club domestic league appearances and goals as of 30 August 2026

Roman Andreyevich Gribovsky (Belarusian: Раман Андрэевіч Грыбоўскі; Russian: Роман Андреевич Грибовский; born 17 July 1995) is a Belarusian professional footballer who is currently playing for Smorgon.
