= Timofey Lukashevich =

Belarusian footballer

Personal information
- Date of birth: 21 March 1997 (age 29)
- Place of birth: Belarus
- Position: Midfielder

Team information
- Current team: Traktor Minsk

Youth career
- 2015–2016: Dinamo Minsk

Senior career*
Years	Team	Apps	(Gls)
2015–2017	Dinamo Minsk	0	(0)
2017	→ Luch Minsk (loan)	29	(3)
2018	Luch Minsk	15	(0)
2019	Dnyapro Mogilev	8	(0)
2019	→ Granit Mikashevichi (loan)	10	(0)
2021–2023	Maxline Vitebsk	30	(4)
2023–	Traktor Minsk	14	(2)

International career
2017	Belarus U21	2	(2)
- * Club domestic league appearances and goals as of 31 December 2023

Timofey Lukashevich (Belarusian: Цімафей Лукашэвіч; Russian: Тимофей Лукашевич; born 21 March 1997) is a Belarusian professional footballer who plays for Traktor Minsk.
