= Ivan Schyokin =

Belarusian footballer and manager

Personal information
- Full name: Ivan Grigoryevich Schyokin
- Date of birth: 15 July 1944
- Place of birth: Cahul, Moldovan SSR
- Date of death: 22 January 2000 (aged 55)
- Place of death: Soligorsk, Belarus
- Height: 1.72 m (5 ft 8 in)
- Position: Forward

Senior career*
Years	Team	Apps	(Gls)
1963	Stroitel Beltsy		
1964	Luceafărul Tiraspol	16	(1)
1966	Dvina Vitebsk	32	(2)
1967–1975	Bug Brest	202	(43)

Managerial career
- 1977–1978: Dinamo Brest (assistant)
- 1978–1982: Dinamo Brest
- 1985–1986: Dinamo Brest
- 1987–1991: Dinamo Minsk (assistant/reserves)
- 1992–1994: Dinamo-93 Minsk
- 1994–1997: Dinamo Minsk
- 1997–2000: Shakhtyor Soligorsk
- * Club domestic league appearances and goals

Ivan Grigoryevich Schyokin (Russian: Иван Щёкин; 15 July 1944 – 22 January 2000) was a Belarusian football manager and footballer who last managed Shakhtyor Soligorsk.

== Playing career ==
Schyokin played as a striker and played for Belarusian side Dynamo Brest.

== Managerial career ==
Schyokin started his managerial career with Belarusian side Dynamo Brest.

== Death ==
Schyokin died in January 2000 after an accident during Shakhtyor Soligorsk pre-season practice in the pool.
