= Nikita Bylinkin =

Belarusian footballer

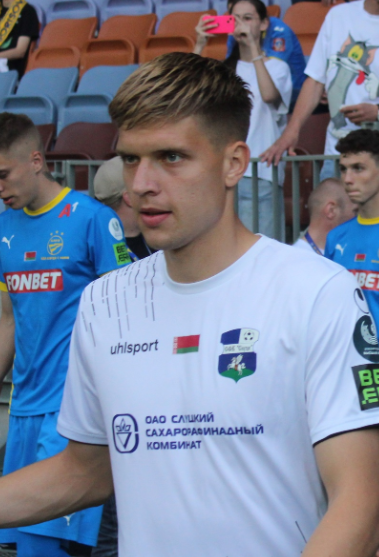

Personal information
- Date of birth: 27 January 1999 (age 27)
- Place of birth: Slutsk, Minsk Oblast, Belarus
- Height: 1.82 m (6 ft 0 in)
- Position: Defender

Team information
- Current team: Slutsk
- Number: 19

Youth career
- 2015–2016: Slutsk

Senior career*
Years	Team	Apps	(Gls)
2016–2019	Slutsk	0	(0)
2019	→ Smolevichi (loan)	4	(1)
2019	→ Viktoriya Maryina Gorka (loan)	13	(2)
2020	Arsenal Dzerzhinsk	15	(0)
2021–2024	Slutsk	91	(1)
2025	Neman Grodno	1	(0)
2025	Slutsk	7	(0)
2026	Dnepr Mogilev	2	(0)
2026–	Slutsk	4	(0)
- * Club domestic league appearances and goals as of 22 August 2026

Nikita Bylinkin (Belarusian: Мікіта Былінкін; Russian: Никита Былинкин; born 27 January 1999) is a Belarusian professional footballer who plays for Slutsk.
