= Vadim Melnik =

Belarusian footballer

Personal information
- Date of birth: 28 January 2001 (age 25)
- Place of birth: Minsk, Belarus
- Height: 1.74 m (5 ft 9 in)
- Position: Midfielder

Youth career
- 2017–2020: Isloch Minsk Raion

Senior career*
Years	Team	Apps	(Gls)
2020–2022	Isloch Minsk Raion	7	(0)
2022	→ Molodechno (loan)	22	(1)
2023	Molodechno	0	(0)
- * Club domestic league appearances and goals as of 31 December 2023

Vadim Melnik (Belarusian: Вадзім Мельнік; Russian: Вадим Мельник; born 26 August 2001) is a Belarusian professional footballer who plays for Molodechno.
