= Artem Zimin =

Belarusian footballer

Personal information
- Date of birth: 24 March 2003 (age 23)
- Place of birth: Minsk, Belarus
- Height: 1.77 m (5 ft 10 in)
- Position: Midfielder

Team information
- Current team: Osipovichi
- Number: 19

Youth career
- 2017–2020: BATE Borisov

Senior career*
Years	Team	Apps	(Gls)
2021–2023	Isloch Minsk Raion	10	(0)
2024	Maxline Vitebsk	12	(2)
2024	Molodechno	12	(1)
2025	Belshina Bobruisk	27	(1)
2026–	Osipovichi	11	(3)
- * Club domestic league appearances and goals as of 6 July 2026

Artem Zimin (Belarusian: Арцём Зімін; Russian: Артём Зимин; born 24 March 2003) is a Belarusian professional footballer who plays for Belarusian First League club Osipovichi.
