= Zakhar Chervyakov =

Belarusian footballer

Personal information
- Date of birth: 30 August 2002 (age 24)
- Place of birth: Vitebsk, Belarus
- Position: Forward

Team information
- Current team: Vitebsk
- Number: 14

Youth career
- 2016–2020: Vitebsk

Senior career*
Years	Team	Apps	(Gls)
2020–	Vitebsk	102	(11)
- * Club domestic league appearances and goals as of 3 July 2026

Zakhar Chervyakov (Belarusian: Захар Чарвякоў; Russian: Захар Червяков; born 30 August 2002) is a Belarusian footballer, who plays for Vitebsk.
