= Emmanuel Ovono =

Gabonese footballer (born 2001)

Personal information
- Full name: Emmanuel Romess Ovono Essogo
- Date of birth: 26 March 2001 (age 25)
- Place of birth: Libreville, Gabon
- Height: 1.84 m (6 ft 0 in)
- Position: Forward

Team information
- Current team: Vesoul

Senior career*
Years	Team	Apps	(Gls)
2017–2020	AEL		
2020–2021	AS Bouenguidi		
2021–2022	Slavia Mozyr	35	(3)
2023	Torpedo-BelAZ Zhodino	17	(2)
2024	US Oyem		
2025–	Vesoul		

International career
2019–2023	Gabon U23		
- * Club domestic league appearances and goals as of 31 December 2023

Emmanuel Romess Ovono Essogo (born 26 March 2001) is a Gabonese professional footballer who plays as a forward for Régional 1 club Vesoul.

== International career ==
He captained the Gabon national under-23 team.

== Personal life ==
Born in Gabon, he is also Equatoguinean descent.
