= Ilya Rutsky =

Belarusian footballer

Personal information
- Full name: Ilya Valentinovich Rutsky
- Date of birth: 3 December 1999 (age 26)
- Place of birth: Brest, Belarus
- Height: 1.76 m (5 ft 9 in)
- Position: Defender

Team information
- Current team: Torpedo-BelAZ Zhodino
- Number: 19

Youth career
- 2013–2015: Dinamo Minsk
- 2015–2017: Belshina Bobruisk

Senior career*
| Years | Team | Apps | (Gls) |
| 2017–2020 | Belshina Bobruisk | 50 | (0) |
| 2020 | → Sputnik Rechitsa (loan) | 20 | (0) |
| 2021–2023 | Slavia Mozyr | 68 | (3) |
| 2024– | Torpedo-BelAZ Zhodino | 60 | (5) |
- * Club domestic league appearances and goals as of 3 July 2026

Ilya Valentinovich Rutsky (Belarusian: Ілья Валянцінавіч Руцкі; Russian: Илья Валентинович Руцкий; born 3 December 1999) is a Belarusian professional footballer who plays for Torpedo-BelAZ Zhodino.
