= Aleksandr Sakovich =

Russian footballer

Personal information
- Full name: Aleksandr Grigoryevich Sakovich
- Date of birth: 31 March 1998 (age 28)
- Place of birth: Yurga, Kemerovo Oblast, Russia
- Height: 1.78 m (5 ft 10 in)
- Position: Midfielder

Youth career
- 2013–2014: DYuSSh Yurga
- 2015: SDYuSShOR Kemerovo
- 2015–2017: UOR Leninsk-Kuznetsky
- 2017–2018: Tom Tomsk

Senior career*
Years	Team	Apps	(Gls)
2019–2021	Tom Tomsk	21	(0)
2021	Saturn Ramenskoye	10	(0)
2022	Vitebsk	19	(0)
2023	Kuban-Holding	31	(1)
2024	Khimik Dzerzhinsk	14	(0)
- * Club domestic league appearances and goals as of 16 November 2024

Aleksandr Grigoryevich Sakovich (Russian: Александр Григорьевич Сакович; born 31 March 1998) is a Russian football player.

== Club career ==
He made his debut in the Russian Football National League for FC Tom Tomsk on 3 November 2019 in a game against FC Luch Vladivostok.
