= Yevgeny Zemko =

Belarusian footballer

Personal information
- Full name: Yevgeny Dmitriyevich Zemko
- Date of birth: 16 February 1996 (age 30)
- Place of birth: Vitebsk, Belarus
- Height: 1.87 m (6 ft 2 in)
- Position: Midfielder

Team information
- Current team: Naftan Novopolotsk
- Number: 10

Youth career
- 2013–2014: Dnepr Mogilev

Senior career*
Years	Team	Apps	(Gls)
2015–2016	Vitebsk	0	(0)
2016	→ Orsha (loan)	12	(2)
2016	→ Granit Mikashevichi (loan)	9	(0)
2017–2018	Naftan Novopolotsk	12	(0)
2018–2020	Orsha	37	(3)
2020–2022	Murom	47	(0)
2022	Slavia Mozyr	10	(0)
2023	Aksu	10	(0)
2024	Torpedo-BelAZ Zhodino	0	(0)
2024	→ Torpedo-BelAZ-2 Zhodino	7	(0)
2024–2025	Minsk	12	(0)
2025	KDV Tomsk	1	(0)
2026–	Naftan Novopolotsk	1	(0)
- * Club domestic league appearances and goals as of 22 March 2026

Yevgeny Dmitriyevich Zemko (Belarusian: Яўген Дзмітрыевіч Зямко; Russian: Евгений Дмитриевич Земко; born 16 February 1996) is a Belarusian professional footballer who plays for Naftan Novopolotsk. Besides Belarus, he has played in Russia and Kazakhstan.
