= Roman Lisovsky =

Belarusian footballer

Personal information
- Full name: Roman Aleksandrovich Lisovsky
- Date of birth: 22 November 2001 (age 24)
- Place of birth: Minsk, Belarus
- Height: 1.78 m (5 ft 10 in)
- Position: Midfielder

Team information
- Current team: Vitebsk
- Number: 7

Youth career
- 2016–2019: BATE Borisov

Senior career*
Years	Team	Apps	(Gls)
2020–2021	Isloch Minsk Raion	6	(0)
2021	→ Vitebsk (loan)	23	(0)
2022–	Vitebsk	109	(7)
- * Club domestic league appearances and goals as of 3 July 2026

Roman Aleksandrovich Lisovsky (Belarusian: Раман Аляксандравіч Лісоўскі; Russian: Роман Александрович Лисовский; born 22 November 2001) is a Belarusian professional footballer who plays for Vitebsk.
