= Ana Roner Lavrič =

Slovenian organist (1869–1957)

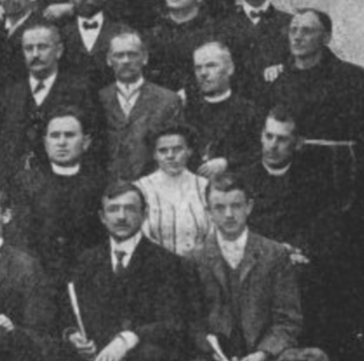
- Ana Roner Lavrič (in a white blouse) at a church-music course in Ljubljana, September 1908
- Born: Ana Ivana Jožefa Roner; December 30, 1869; Ljubljana, Austria-Hungary
- Died: August 31, 1957 (aged 87); Ljubljana, Yugoslavia
- Occupations: organist, music teacher, choirmaster

Ana Ivana Jožefa Roner Lavrič (30 December 1869 – 31 August 1957) was a Slovenian organist and music teacher. In her time, she was considered one of the best Slovenian organists. She was also very active in Cecilian Society and Mutual Aid Society of Organists and Choirmasters.

== Early life ==
Ana Roner Lavrič was born on 30 December 1869 into a family with noble roots in the Krakovo district of Ljubljana. Her mother was an entrepreneur, Josipina Alojzija Melcher von Reuterburg, and her father was a café owner, Nikolaj Roner. She was their eldest child. In her youth she studied music and piano. Later she studied harmony and organ with the Ljubljana cathedral organist and composer Anton Foerster.

== Work ==
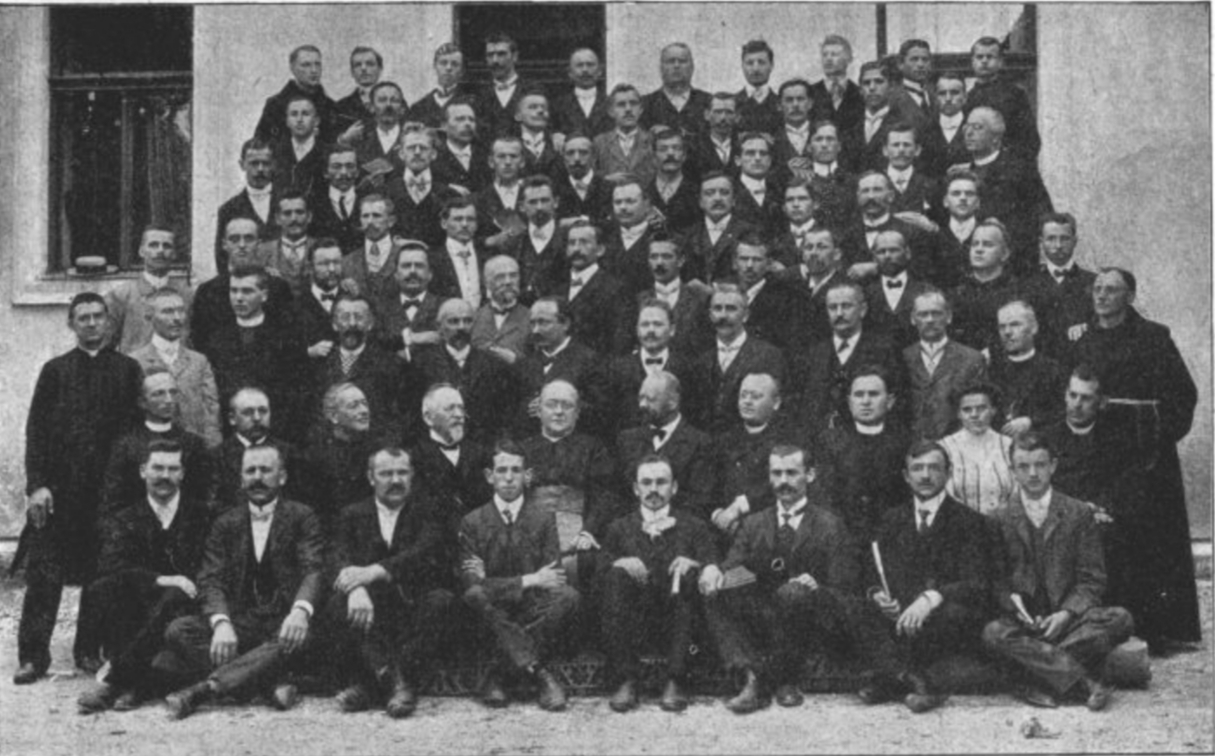
Participants of the church-music course in Ljubljana, September 1908. Ana Roner Lavrič is second from the right in the second row at the front.

In the 1890s, she became Anton Foerster’s assistant and frequently substituted for him at the organ in the Ljubljana Cathedral, and also sang in the cathedral choir loft. She also worked as a piano and music teacher, supporting herself with this for several decades in addition to her organ post.

During Christmas 1901, she took up the post of organist and choir director in the Church of Saint Joseph in Ljubljana. She held this post for more than four decades. On 13 July 1905, she graduated with distinction from the organ school in Ljubljana (as a private candidate), as the first woman to do so. In the following years she attended several church-music courses held in Ljubljana by the Cecilian Society (Slovenian Catholic music society). She was an active member of the Cecilian Society and served as its secretary.

In 1908, she took up the post of organist at the Church of Saint John the Baptist in Trnovo. In this post she was the second trained organist after the self-taught Frančiška Gostič. She worked at the Trnovo church for ten years. In 1909, she took up the post of organist at the Church of Mary Help of Christians of the knightly order in Križanke in Ljubljana, which she held for several decades.

On 12 January 1910, she married Anton Lavrič, more than a decade her junior, from Škocjan, who worked as head of the music department at the Catholic Bookshop (later the Yugoslav Bookshop) in Ljubljana, and as choirmaster at the Trnovo and Križanke churches. He grew up in a musical family, and his sister worked as a church organist in Mokronog. They had no surviving children (they had none or all died in childhood). Until her mother's death in 1916, the couple lived together with her. She also wrote several articles about her work in Cerkveni glasbenik, the newspaper of Cecilian Society. She was an active member of the Mutual Aid Society of Organists and Choirmasters, serving as its treasurer. Alongside the virtuoso organist and composer Josipina Eleonora Hudovernik, she was considered one of the best Slovenian organists.

== Later life and death ==
After the Second World War, the Church of Saint Joseph, where she was employed, was nationalized and turned into a film studio. The Križanke church was also nationalized, and a school for arts and crafts moved into it. As a result, she lost her job as organist. She died on 31 August 1957 in Ljubljana. Less than a month and a half after her, her husband also died.
