= Maksim Grechikha =

Belarusian footballer

Personal information
- Date of birth: 10 June 1993 (age 33)
- Place of birth: Vitebsk, Belarus
- Height: 1.75 m (5 ft 9 in)
- Position: Midfielder

Team information
- Current team: Volna Pinsk
- Number: 10

Youth career
- 2007–2011: Vitebsk

Senior career*
Years	Team	Apps	(Gls)
2012–2015	Vitebsk	49	(2)
2015	→ Slonim (loan)	14	(3)
2016	Orsha	25	(3)
2017	Torpedo Minsk	27	(2)
2018	Luch Minsk	1	(0)
2018–2019	Orsha	34	(3)
2020–2024	Volna Pinsk	126	(17)
2024	Niva Dolbizno	14	(0)
2025–	Volna Pinsk	47	(13)

International career
- Belarus U19
- * Club domestic league appearances and goals as of 6 July 2026

Maksim Grechikha (Belarusian: Максім Грачыха; Russian: Максим Гречиха; born 10 June 1993) is a Belarusian professional footballer who plays for Volna Pinsk.
