= Maksim Yablonsky =

Belarusian footballer

Personal information
- Full name: Maksim Aleksandrovich Yablonsky
- Date of birth: 15 August 1996 (age 30)
- Place of birth: Smorgon, Grodno Oblast, Belarus
- Height: 1.72 m (5 ft 7 1/2 in)
- Position: Defender

Team information
- Current team: Smorgon
- Number: 9

Youth career
- Smorgon

Senior career*
Years	Team	Apps	(Gls)
2013–2016	Smorgon	75	(4)
2017–2024	Neman Grodno	123	(11)
2024	→ Smorgon (loan)	9	(0)
2025	Smorgon	20	(2)
2026	Molodechno	7	(0)
2026–	Smorgon	3	(1)

International career^{‡}
2016–2018	Belarus U21	4	(0)
- * Club domestic league appearances and goals as of 1 August 2026 ‡ National team caps and goals as of 10 September 2018

Maksim Aleksandrovich Yablonsky (Belarusian: Максім Аляксандравіч Яблонскі; Russian: Максим Александрович Яблонский; born 15 August 1996) is a Belarusian professional footballer who plays for Smorgon.
