= Stanislav Izhakovsky =

Belarusian footballer (born 1994)

Personal information
- Date of birth: 22 August 1994 (age 32)
- Place of birth: Gomel, Belarus
- Height: 1.88 m (6 ft 2 in)
- Position: Centre back

Youth career
- 2011–2014: Gomel

Senior career*
Years	Team	Apps	(Gls)
2014–2018	Gomel	43	(1)
2017	→ Belshina Bobruisk (loan)	28	(0)
2018	→ Granit Mikashevichi (loan)	27	(2)
2019–2021	Sputnik Rechitsa	60	(1)
2021	Shakhtyor Petrikov	19	(0)
2022	Maxline Rogachev	23	(0)
2023	Gomel	3	(0)
2024	Lokomotiv Gomel	31	(2)
2025	Bumprom Gomel	28	(1)

International career
2013–2015	Belarus U21	4	(0)
- * Club domestic league appearances and goals as of 7 April 2026

Stanislav Izhakovsky (Belarusian: Станіслаў Іжакоўскі; Russian: Станислав Ижаковский; born 22 August 1994) is a Belarusian professional footballer.
