= Aleksey Lavrik =

Belarusian footballer

Personal information
- Full name: Aleksey Andreyevich Lavrik
- Date of birth: 7 August 2000 (age 26)
- Place of birth: Moscow, Russia
- Height: 1.90 m (6 ft 3 in)
- Position: Defender

Team information
- Current team: Dinamo Brest
- Number: 55

Youth career
- 2007–2012: Dynamo Moscow
- 2012–2018: Minsk

Senior career*
Years	Team	Apps	(Gls)
2018–2020	Minsk	8	(0)
2021–2023	Energetik-BGU Minsk	73	(2)
2024	Neman Grodno	15	(0)
2025–	Dinamo Brest	25	(2)

International career^{‡}
2016–2017	Belarus U17	6	(0)
2018	Belarus U21	2	(0)
- * Club domestic league appearances and goals as of 6 July 2026 ‡ National team caps and goals as of 16 November 2018

Aleksey Lavrik (Belarusian: Аляксей Лаўрык; Russian: Алексей Лаврик; born 7 August 2000) is a Belarusian footballer who plays for Dinamo Brest.

He is a son of Belarusian coach and former international footballer Andrei Lavrik.
