= Yuriy Pantya =

Ukrainian footballer

Personal information
- Date of birth: 5 April 1990 (age 36)
- Place of birth: Chernivtsi, Ukrainian SSR
- Height: 1.75 m (5 ft 9 in)
- Position: Midfielder

Team information
- Current team: Neman Grodno
- Number: 8

Youth career
- 2006–2007: Osvita Chernivtsi

Senior career*
Years	Team	Apps	(Gls)
2012	Pidhirya Storozhynets		
2012–2013	Nistru Otaci	10	(1)
2013	Bukovyna-2-LS Chernivtsi	5	(2)
2013–2014	Bukovyna Chernivtsi	22	(0)
2015	Gvardeyets Gvardeyskoye		
2015	Skif Simferopol		
2015–2016	Bakhchisaray	24	(1)
2016–2018	Krymteplytsia Molodizhne	68	(2)
2019–2020	Slavia Mozyr	49	(0)
2021–2022	Gomel	54	(2)
2023–	Neman Grodno	78	(9)
- * Club domestic league appearances and goals as of 3 July 2026

Yuriy Pantya (Ukrainian: Юрій Пантя; born 5 April 1990) is a Ukrainian professional footballer who plays for Neman Grodno.
