= FC Osipovichi =

- Full name: Футбольны клуб «Асіповічы» (Futbol'ny klub Asipovichy)
- Founded: 1994
- Ground: Yunatstva Stadium, Asipovichy
- Capacity: 1,300
- Director: Vladimir Plyut
- Manager: Andrey Pyshnik
- League: Belarusian First League
- 2025: 17th of 18
Home colours	Away colours

FC Osipovichi or FK Asipovichy (Belarusian: ФК Асіповічы, Russian: ФК Осиповичи) is a Belarusian football club based in Asipovichy, Mohilev Oblast.

== History ==
FC Osipovichi was founded in 1994 as KRZ Osipovichi and started playing in the Belarusian Second League since the 1994–95 season. In 1997, they changed their name to FC Svisloch-Krovlya Osipovichi (FK Svislach-Dakh Asipovichy) and won the Second League, receiving promotion to the First League. In 1998, Svisloch-Krovlya finished 2nd in the First League and were promoted to the Premier League. In 1999, Svisloch-Krovlya finished last and were relegated back to the First League, where they were playing from 2000 to 2002. In 2001, the team's name was shortened to FC Svisloch Osipovichi (Svislach) and in 2002 to FC Osipovichi (Asipovichy). From 2003 to 2016, they played in the Second League. In 2016, they finished at the 2nd place, which led to promotion to the Belarusian First League. The season 2017 they finished on the 15th place in the First League and were relegated back to the Second League. Since 2018, they play in the Second League.

=== Name changes ===
- 1994: formed as KRZ
- 1997: renamed to Svisloch-Krovlya (Russian: Свислочь-Кровля) / Svislach-Dakh (Belarusian: Свіслач-Дах)
- 2001: renamed to Svisloch / Svislach
- 2002: renamed to Osipovichi / Asipovichy

== Current squad ==
As of 19 October 2026

Note: Flags indicate national team as defined under FIFA eligibility rules; some limited exceptions apply. Players may hold more than one non-FIFA nationality.

No.	Pos.	Nation	Player
1	GK	BLR	Maksim Makarov
2	MF	RUS	Denis Ssorin
3	DF	BLR	Vladislav Grekovich
4	DF	BLR	Maksim Zhordochkin
5	MF	BLR	Aleksandr Minkevich (on loan from Belshina Bobruisk)
6	DF	BLR	Gleb Mishin
7	DF	BLR	Maksim Azarov
8	FW	BLR	Ilya Tishurov
9	FW	BLR	Daniil Kulikov (on loan from Belshina Bobruisk)
10	MF	BLR	Dmitriy Denisenko
11	FW	RUS	Timofey Kovardaev
12	MF	BLR	Alyaksandr Hryn
14	MF	BLR	Timur Minets (on loan from Neman Grodno)

No.	Pos.	Nation	Player
15	MF	BLR	Oleg Petrovsky (on loan from Neman Grodno)
16	GK	BLR	Rustam Gurinovich
17	FW	BLR	Alyaksandr Yemelyanaw
18	DF	RUS	Andrey Khadzhiev
19	MF	BLR	Artem Zimin
21	MF	BLR	Yevgeniy Yelezarenko
22	MF	BLR	Andrey Yemelyanaw
23	DF	BLR	Andrey Kukhotskovolets
25	MF	BLR	Stanislav Lomako (on loan from Belshina Bobruisk)
27	MF	RUS	Ivan Alekseyev
29	MF	BLR	Marat Vasilkevich (on loan from Neman Grodno)
33	GK	BLR	Yevgeny Yaroshevich (on loan from Dinamo Minsk)
—	MF	BLR	Denis Pyshnik

== League and Cup history ==
Season	Level	Pos	Pld	W	D	L	Goals	Points	Domestic Cup	Notes
1994–95	3rd	10	22	4	2	16	19–58	10		
1995	3rd	10	12	4	4	4	11–10	16		
1996	3rd	5	26	14	5	7	43–21	47		
1997	3rd	1	28	23	3	2	82–15	72		Promoted
1998	2nd	2	30	18	6	6	63–27	60	Round of 32	Promoted
1999	1st	15	30	4	4	22	24–74	16	Round of 32	Relegated
2000	2nd	8	30	13	5	12	40–39	44	Round of 16	
2001	2nd	11	28	9	4	15	34–59	31	Round of 64	
2002	2nd	16	30	2	3	25	17–100	9	Round of 64	Relegated
2003	3rd	8	22	8	2	12	32–46	26		
2004	3rd	3	24	16	3	5	52–17	51	Round of 32	
2005	3rd	6	26	13	4	9	46–45	43	Round of 32	
2006	3rd	7	32	16	3	13	61–42	46^{1}	Round of 64	
2007	3rd	11	30	8	6	16	36–49	30	Round of 32	
2008	3rd	13	30	9	6	15	40–51	33	Round of 64	
2009	3rd	6	26	12	3	11	41–44	39	Round of 32	
2010	3rd	8	34	15	5	14	51–64	55	Round of 64	
2017	2nd	15	30	6	7	17	30–62	25	Round of 32	Relegated

- ^{1} 5 points deducted for failure to pay the entrance fee.
