= Vladislav Poloz =

Belarusian footballer

Personal information
- Date of birth: 6 June 2001 (age 25)
- Place of birth: Mozyr, Gomel Oblast, Belarus
- Height: 1.78 m (5 ft 10 in)
- Position: Midfielder

Team information
- Current team: Dinamo Minsk
- Number: 13

Youth career
- 2019–2020: Slavia Mozyr

Senior career*
Years	Team	Apps	(Gls)
2020–2025	Slavia Mozyr	103	(13)
2026–	Dinamo Minsk	3	(0)
- * Club domestic league appearances and goals as of 4 July 2026

Vladislav Poloz (Belarusian: Уладзіслаў Полаз; Russian: Владислав Полоз; born 6 June 2001) is a Belarusian professional footballer who plays for Dinamo Minsk.
