= FC Volna Pinsk =

Volna Pinsk
- Full name: FC Volna Pinsk
- Founded: 1987
- Ground: Volna Stadium, Pinsk
- Capacity: 3,100
- Chairman: Kirill Moyseychuk
- Head coach: Andrey Prokopyuk
- League: Belarusian First League
- 2025: 11th of 18
- Website: http://fcvolna-pinsk.by/
Home colours	Away colours

FC Volna Pinsk is a Belarusian football club based in Pinsk, Brest Oblast. The club plays in the Belarusian First League.

== History ==
The club was established in 1987 as Kommunalnik Pinsk. The club spent all its seasons after 1992 at the 2nd of 3rd level of Belarusian football. They came close to promotion to the top level several times in the 1990s, finishing in the top three of the Belarusian First League on four occasions, and losing in the promotion/relegation play-offs in fall 1995 to Shinnik Bobruisk.

In 1996–2006, it was known as FC Pinsk-900. In 2006, the club changed its name to Volna Pinsk as the previously existed Pinsk army club that existed after the World War II.

== Current squad ==
As of 1 September 2026

Note: Flags indicate national team as defined under FIFA eligibility rules; some limited exceptions apply. Players may hold more than one non-FIFA nationality.

No.	Pos.	Nation	Player
1	GK	BLR	Arseniy Asonov
2	DF	BLR	Daniil Prokopchuk
4	DF	BLR	Aleksandr Kuradovets
6	DF	BLR	Ivan Tarabesh
7	DF	BLR	Azam Radzhabov
8	MF	BLR	Artyom Vlasov
9	MF	BLR	Dmitry Nizhnik
10	MF	BLR	Maksim Grechikha
11	MF	BLR	Daniil Tkachik
12	GK	BLR	Stanislav Letsko
15	MF	BLR	Vital Kibuk
16	GK	BLR	Sergey Kirikovich

No.	Pos.	Nation	Player
17	DF	BLR	Kirill Polkhovskiy
19	MF	BLR	Kirill Kovalevich
20	MF	BLR	Roman Terletskiy
21	MF	BLR	Anton Susha
22	FW	BLR	Artem Samuylik (on loan from Dinamo Minsk)
25	DF	BLR	Kirill Kovsh (on loan from Dinamo Minsk)
33	MF	BLR	Ilya Sedro (on loan from Dynamo Brest)
55	MF	BLR	Dmitriy Lesnyak
62	FW	BLR	Stanislav Baluk
77	MF	BLR	Yegor Nikoporenok
91	FW	BLR	Dmitriy Matyash (on loan from Arsenal Dzerzhinsk)
97	DF	BLR	Yaroslav Oreshkevich

== Recent seasons ==
Season	League	Pos.	Pl.	W	D	L	GS	GA	P	Cup	Notes	Manager
1992	2D	3	15	8	4	3	20	13	20	1st round		
1992–93	2D	5	30	15	4	11	52	40	34	1st round		
1993–94	2D	3	28	17	6	5	58	21	40	Quarter-finals		
1994–95	2D	3	30	16	8	6	45	26	40	2nd round		
1995	2D	2	14	9	2	3	22	13	29	Last 32		
1996	2D	5	24	10	8	6	40	19	38	Last 32		
1997	2D	5	30	12	8	10	43	36	44	Last 32		
1998	2D	3	30	17	8	5	54	22	59	Last 32		
1999	2D	15	30	6	8	16	33	50	26	Last 32	Relegated	
2000	3D – B	6	16	5	4	7	17	24	19	1st round		
2001	3D	7	34	17	3	14	61	37	54	2nd round		
2002	3D	2	24	16	4	4	50	22	52	2nd round	Promoted	
2003	2D	16	30	5	4	21	28	59	19	1st round	Relegated	
2004	3D	4	24	15	5	4	62	25	50	2nd round		
2005	3D	2	26	21	4	1	57	16	67	2nd round	Promoted	
2006	2D	8	26	10	4	12	47	48	34	1st round		
2007	2D	7	26	11	6	9	34	38	39	2nd round		
2008	2D	4	26	15	3	8	39	34	48	2nd round		
2009	2D	7	26	11	6	9	34	38	39	Last 16		
2010	2D	10	30	11	2	17	31	48	35	2nd round		
2011	2D	7	30	13	6	11	52	38	45	2nd round		
2012	2D	8	28	8	10	10	24	45	34	2nd round		
2013	2D	12	30	11	6	13	30	41	39	Last 16		
2014	2D	16	30	4	8	18	26	62	20	Last 32	Relegated	
2015	3D – B	5	18	9	5	4	43	18	32	Last 32		
2016	3D	1	24	19	3	2	87	20	60	Last 32	Promoted	
2017	2D	7	30	13	4	13	48	48	43	Last 32		
2018	2D	13	28	6	7	15	23	49	25	Last 32		
2019	2D	12	28	5	6	17	29	49	21	Last 32		
2020	2D	9	26	7	6	13	41	52	27	Last 32		
2021	2D	4	33	16	8	9	49	39	56	Last 32		
2022	2D	7	24	10	6	8	44	35	36	3rd round		
2023	2D	8	32	12	7	13	41	49	43	Last 32		
2024	2D	5	34	21	3	10	70	43	66	Last 32		
2025	2D	-	-	-	-	-	-	-	-	Last 16		
