= FC Smorgon =

Smorgon
- Full name: ДУФКіС «Футбольны клуб „Смаргонь“» (DUFKiS Futbol'ny klub Smarhon)
- Founded: 1987
- Ground: Youth Stadium; Smarhon, Belarus
- Capacity: 3,200
- Chairman: Pavel Lyutsko
- Manager: Vyacheslav Gerashchenko
- League: Belarusian First League
- 2025: Belarusian Premier League, 14th of 16 (relegated via Play-offs)
Home colours	Away colours

FC Smorgon, also known as FK Smarhon or FK Smorgon (Belarusian: ФК Смаргонь; Russian: ФК Сморгонь), is a Belarusian professional football club based in Smarhon. They play in the Belarusian First League, the second level in the Belarusian league system.

== History ==
- 1987: founded as FC Stankostroitel Smorgon (Belarusian: Станкабудаўнік, romanized: Stankabudawnik Smarhon)
- 1993: renamed to FC Smorgon / FK Smarhon

== Current squad ==
As of 19 October 2026.

Note: Flags indicate national team as defined under FIFA eligibility rules; some limited exceptions apply. Players may hold more than one non-FIFA nationality.

No.	Pos.	Nation	Player
1	GK	BLR	Maksim Azarko
2	DF	CMR	Christian Intsoen
3	MF	BLR	Maksin Autko (on loan from Neman Grodno)
7	FW	CMR	Jean-Louis Mounga
9	DF	BLR	Maksim Yablonsky
11	MF	BLR	Ivan Sivkov
16	GK	BLR	Daniil Perov
17	MF	BLR	Matvey Dukso (on loan from Dynamo Brest)
18	FW	BLR	Roman Gribovsky
19	GK	BLR	Anton Velesyuk
22	DF	BLR	Vadim Galko

No.	Pos.	Nation	Player
23	MF	BLR	Artem Stankevich
25	MF	BLR	Yaroslav Yarotsky
27	MF	BLR	Artur Tishko
30	MF	RUS	Boris Fartuna
33	DF	BLR	Aleksandr Poznyak
47	MF	BLR	Rodion Kukhley
52	MF	BLR	Yegor Mychelkin
59	FW	BLR	Vladislav Kabachevsky
77	DF	BLR	Ilya Bogdanovich
78	MF	BLR	Vladislav Kovalevich
99	MF	BLR	Gleb Malashenko (on loan from Dnepr Mogilev)

== League and Cup history ==
Season	Level	Pos	Pld	W	D	L	Goals	Points	Domestic Cup	Notes
1992	2nd	16	15	3	1	11	13–34	7	Round of 32	
1992–93	2nd	16	30	4	5	21	17–70	13	Round of 32	Relegated
1993–94	3rd	17	34	4	9	21	27–80	17		Relegated
4 seasons on 4th (amateur) level
1998	3rd	12	26	6	6	14	26–51	24		
1999	3rd	5	24	11	8	5	35–23	41		
2000	3rd	4	22	10	5	7	28–23	25		Qualified for the final round
2000	3rd	4	14^{1}	5	3	6	14–17	18		
2001	3rd	2	34	25	4	5	63–16	79	Round of 32	Promoted
2002	2nd	14	30	8	5	17	21–36	29	Round of 32	
2003	2nd	3	30	17	7	6	47–20	58	Round of 64	
2004	2nd	3	30	14	11	5	49–21	53	Round of 32	
2005	2nd	3	30	15	9	6	57–35	54	Round of 64	
2006	2nd	2	26	16	7	3	57–27	55	Round of 32	Promoted
2007	1st	10	26	6	8	12	15–29	26	Round of 32	
2008	1st	8	30	10	9	11	26–39	39	Round of 32	
2009	1st	14	26	2	9	15	17–46	15	Round of 16	Relegated
2010	2nd	12	30	8	8	14	33–43	32	Round of 32	
2011	2nd	11	30	9	7	14	32–45	34	Round of 32	
2012	2nd	10	30	7	10	11	23–32	31	Round of 32	
2013	2nd	6	30	13	7	10	45–35	46	Round of 16	
2014	2nd	4	30	13	7	10	42–32	46	Round of 16	
2015	2nd	5	30	15	8	7	60–41	53	Round of 32	
2016	2nd						–		Round of 16	

- ^{1} Including 6 games carried from the first round.
