= FC Minsk =

Association football club in Belarus

Minsk
- Full name: Football Club Minsk
- Founded: 2006; 20 years ago
- Ground: FC Minsk Stadium; Minsk, Belarus
- Capacity: 3,000
- Chairman: Sergey Lushchik
- Manager: Artyom Chelyadinsky
- League: Belarusian Premier League
- 2025: Belarusian Premier League, 5th of 16
- Website: fcminsk.by
Home colours	Away colours

FC Minsk (Belarusian: ФК Мінск) is a Belarusian professional football club based in Minsk. They play in the Belarusian Premier League, the highest tier of Belarusian football. Their colours are red and navy blue.

== History ==
The club was established in 2006 and was based on the Belarusian First League club Smena Minsk. FC Minsk took over Smena's license and was able to start immediately operating in the Belarusian First League without having to first play in the Second League, the third tier in Belarus. In the club's inaugural season in the First League, they were able to finish in first place guaranteeing them promotion to the Belarusian Premier League.

In their top tier debut season, FC Minsk showed weak performances and were relegated at end of 2007, but they managed to bounce straight back the following year with a dominant campaign in the Belarusian First League scoring 72 goals and failing to win in only 3 of the 26 games. 2008 therefore saw them once again competing in the Belarusian Premier League where they have remained ever since.

A 3rd-placed finish in 2010 saw FC Minsk embark on their first ever European campaign in the 2011–12 UEFA Europa League. In the first qualifying round, they were pitched against AZAL Baku of Azerbaijan and managed a 3–2 aggregate win over two legs. The second qualifying round saw them drawn against Gaziantepspor of Turkey. After a 1–1 draw at home, the away fixture in Gaziantep saw the Turkish side win 4–1 as the tie finished 5–2 on aggregate in favour of Gaziantepspor.

In 2013, FC Minsk changed their club crest for the current one. The same year they have qualified for the second qualifying round of the 2013–14 UEFA Europa League by winning Belarusian Cup. This campaign was more successful as Minsk first eliminated Valletta of Malta 3–1 on aggregate before beating the Scottish team St. Johnstone in the third qualifying round. After losing 0–1 at home, FC Minsk managed to win 1–0 in Perth and prevailed in penalty shootout 3–2, advancing to the play-offs, where they have lost to Standard Liège of Belgium 5–1 on aggregate.

=== Club crest ===
Upon their formation in 2006, FC Minsk adopted a simple white and blue crest which they kept for 7 years until 2013. In 2013, they changed their crest to the current red and navy blue.

Crest of FC Minsk (2006–2013)

== Current squad ==
As of 25 August, 2026.

Note: Flags indicate national team as defined under FIFA eligibility rules; some limited exceptions apply. Players may hold more than one non-FIFA nationality.

No.	Pos.	Nation	Player
2	DF	BLR	Valentin Dikhtiyevskiy
3	DF	BLR	Artyom Sokol
4	DF	BLR	Ruslan Khadarkevich
6	MF	CMR	Felix Abena
7	FW	SEN	Honore Gomis
8	MF	BLR	Arseniy Migdalyonok
9	FW	SEN	Matar Dieye
10	MF	BLR	Gleb Zherdev
11	FW	BFA	Nabil Natama
13	MF	BLR	Ilya Aleksiyevich
15	DF	BLR	Vladislav Yatskevich
16	GK	BLR	Maksim Gerashchenko
17	FW	BLR	Yahor Zubovich
18	MF	BLR	Dmitry Morozov
19	DF	BLR	Konstantin Kuchinsky

No.	Pos.	Nation	Player
20	DF	BLR	Prokhor Sheremet
22	FW	BLR	Aleksandr Makas
23	MF	BLR	Artyom Turich
24	MF	BLR	Stanislav Matusevich
29	MF	BLR	Ilya Dubinets
30	GK	BLR	Alyaksandr Hutar
32	FW	BLR	Vladislav Malyutin
33	DF	RUS	Konstantin Malitsky
37	GK	BLR	Matvey Sukharenko
60	MF	BLR	Ivan Volchok
66	DF	COL	Francisco Campo
79	DF	BLR	Ilya Sviridenko
80	MF	BLR	Aleksandr Ksenofontov
88	DF	SLE	Abdoulie Jarjue Kabia
—	MF	BLR	Yevgeny Kindruk

=== Out on loan ===
Note: Flags indicate national team as defined under FIFA eligibility rules; some limited exceptions apply. Players may hold more than one non-FIFA nationality.

No.	Pos.	Nation	Player
55	DF	BLR	Aleksey Tumanov (at Naftan Novopolotsk)

== League and Cup history ==
Season	Level	Pos	Pld	W	D	L	Goals	Points	Domestic Cup	Notes
2006	2nd	1	26	17	5	4	44–13	56		Promoted
2007	1st	14	26	4	9	13	18–34	21	Semi-finals	Relegated
2008	2nd	1	26	23	2	1	72–11	71	Round of 16	Promoted
2009	1st	9	26	11	3	12	33–26	36	Round of 16	
2010	1st	3	33	18	6	9	59–32	60	Round of 16	
2011	1st	9	33	8	11	14	33–40	35	Quarter-finals	
2012	1st	6	30	11	6	13	36–46	39	Runners-up	
2013	1st	9	32	10	8	14	36–40	38	Winners	
2014	1st	7	32	16	4	12	45–36	52	Semi-finals	
2015	1st	6	26	12	4	10	29–28	40	Round of 32	
2016	1st	4	30	15	8	7	49–24	53	Semi-finals	
2017	1st	14	30	3	14	13	19–39	23	Quarter-finals	
2018	1st	11	30	7	9	14	34–42	30	Round of 16	
2019	1st	9	30	9	9	12	36–44	36	Round of 16	
2020	1st	11	30	11	5	14	45–57	38	Round of 16	
2021	1st	12	30	8	9	13	32–52	33	Quarter-finals	
2022	1st	6	30	12	8	10	47–43	44	Third round	
2023	1st	9	28	8	9	11		33	Round of 16	

== Honours ==
- Belarusian Premier League
  - Third place (1): 2010
- Belarusian Cup
  - Winners (1): 2013
  - Runners-up (1): 2012

== FC Minsk in Europe ==
Season	Competition	Round	Club	1st Leg	2nd Leg	Aggregate
2011–12	UEFA Europa League	1Q	(Azerbaijan) AZAL Baku	1–1	**2–1**	3–2
2011–12	UEFA Europa League	2Q	(Turkey) Gaziantepspor	**1–1**	1–4	2–5
2013–14	UEFA Europa League	2Q	(Malta) Valletta	1–1	**2–0**	3–1
2013–14	UEFA Europa League	3Q	(Scotland) St Johnstone	**0–1**	1–0 (aet)	1–1 (3–2 p.)
2013–14	UEFA Europa League	PO	(Belgium) Standard	0–2	1–3	1–5

Notes

- Home results are noted in **bold**.
- 1Q: First qualifying round
- 2Q: Second qualifying round
- 3Q: Third qualifying round
- PO: Play-off round

== European record ==
Competition	Matches	W	D	L	GF	GA
UEFA Europa League	10	3	3	4	10	14

== Managers ==
- (Belarus) Sergey Yaromko (Feb 23, 2006 – Oct 8, 2009)
- (Belarus) Vitali Tarakanov (Oct 8, 2009 – Oct 4, 2011)
- (Belarus) Andrey Downar (interim) (Oct 5, 2011 – Dec 12, 2011)
- (Belarus) Vadim Skripchenko (Dec 30, 2011 – Oct 12, 2013)
- (Belarus) Andrey Skorobogatko (interim) (Oct 13, 2013 – Dec 2, 2013)
- (Belarus) Andrey Skorobogatko (Dec 3, 2013 – June 3, 2014)
- (Belarus) Andrey Pyshnik (June 3, 2014–)

== Women's team ==
The women's team of Minsk has won the Belarusian Premier League in 2013 and 2014, 2015, 2016, 2017, 2018, 2019. It also has won the Belarusian Women's Cup in 2011, 2013 and 2014.
