= FC Dinamo Minsk =

Association football club in Minsk, Belarus

Dinamo Minsk
- Full name: Футбольны клуб „Дынама-Мінск“ Футбольный клуб «Динамо-Минск» Football Club Dinamo Minsk
- Nickname: Belo-siniye (White-blues)
- Founded: 18 June 1927; 99 years ago
- Ground: Dinamo Stadium, Minsk
- Capacity: 22,000
- Chairman: Andrey Tolmach
- Manager: Alyaksandr Shahoyka
- League: Belarusian Premier League
- 2025: Belarusian Premier League, 2nd of 16
- Website: dinamo-minsk.by
Home colours	Away colours

FC Dinamo Minsk or FK Dynama Minsk (Belarusian: ФК Дынама Мінск; Russian: ФК Динамо Минск) is a Belarusian professional football club based in the capital city of Minsk.

It was founded in 1927 as part of the Soviet Dinamo Sports Society, and was the only club from the Byelorussian SSR that competed in the Soviet Top League, playing 39 of the 54 seasons, and winning the title in 1982. Since the independence of Belarus, the club participates in the Belarusian Premier League, having won 9 league titles and 3 Belarusian Cups.

Dinamo plays its home games in the 22,246-capacity Dinamo Stadium in Minsk. Dinamo is the second Belarusian team, after BATE Borisov, to reach UEFA Europa League group stages (2014–15 and 2015–16).

== History ==
=== Soviet Union ===
Dinamo Minsk was founded in 1927 as a part of the Soviet Dinamo Sports Society. They spent some of their history in the lower leagues of the Soviet Union, but in 1940, they were promoted to the Soviet Top League, becoming the first and only Belarusian team to compete in the Soviet top division. They were relegated to the second level in 1952, but returned to the top level the next year. In 1954, they finished in the third place, their best performance in the top flight to date, and were dissolved, being re-founded as Spartak Minsk, only to be renamed as Belarus Minsk in 1959, in honor of the Soviet republic in the national championship. However, in 1962, they returned to the original name of Dinamo Minsk. They were relegated again from the top level in 1955 and in 1957. They played in the top level again in the 1960 season. They were relegated again in 1973 and returned to the top level in the 1975 season. But they were relegated immediately in 1976. They returned to the top level after 2 years. In November 1973, the team toured Bangladesh and played numerous exhibition matches against the regional selections.

In 1982, Dinamo Minsk won the Soviet championship for the first and only time in their history. The following year saw them debuting in the European Cup against Grasshopper of Switzerland. They reached the quarter-finals of the European Cup after eliminating Grasshoppers and Győri ETO of Hungary, only to be eliminated by Dinamo București. In the 1984–85 season, Dinamo Minsk reached the quarter-finals of the UEFA Cup after beating HJK Helsinki, Sporting CP and Widzew Łódź, but were eventually stopped by Željezničar Sarajevo. 1988 saw Dinamo Minsk up to a new European performance, the quarter-finals of the UEFA Cup Winners' Cup, passing through Gençlerbirliği and Real Sociedad, but being eliminated by Mechelen.

Dinamo Minsk also participated in Belarusian SSR league. Since the mid-50s, their appearances were only sporadic and they were represented by youth teams in later seasons. They have won the championship 7 times.

=== Belarus ===
Dinamo Minsk won the inaugural season of the Belarusian Premier League in 1992. They won 5 league titles until 1995, making only one appearance in the UEFA Champions League, in 1993. However, after a title in 1997, Dinamo Minsk last won the championship in 2004. The 2000s saw Dinamo Minsk failing to secure any league title in the battle against BATE Borisov, thus finishing in lower places.

In 2014, Dinamo Minsk beat MYPA, CFR Cluj and Nacional to be drawn in Group K of UEFA Europa League, along with Italian side Fiorentina, French team Guingamp and Greek side PAOK, becoming the second team, after BATE Borisov, to reach group stages of Europa League. Dinamo finished at the bottom with four points, after a draw with Guingamp and a historical 2–1 victory over Fiorentina.

=== Name history ===
- 1927, club founded as Dinamo Minsk as part of Dynamo sports society
- 1954, renamed to Spartak Minsk being transferred to Spartak volunteer sports society
- 1959, renamed to Belarus Minsk
- 1962, renamed to Dinamo Minsk being transferred back to Dynamo sports society

== Supporters and Rivalries ==
The ultras of Dinamo Minsk are famous for their right-wing political orientation and there have been several riots, clashes with the police forces and chants against the Belarusian authoritarian regime, led by long-time President Alexander Lukashenko.

Their political views as well as geographic proximity and contest for dominance of the city make them rivals with neighbours Partizan Minsk, whose fans tend to be strongly left-wing. Dinamo Minsk also has a big rivalry with BATE Borisov from the city of Barysaw.

== Honours ==
Belarus

- Belarusian Premier League
  - Winners (9): 1992, 1992–93, 1993–94, 1994–95, 1995, 1997, 2004, 2023, 2024
  - Runners-up (10): 1996, 2001, 2005, 2006, 2008, 2009, 2014, 2015, 2017, 2025
  - Third place (7): 2000, 2003, 2012, 2013, 2016, 2018, 2021
- Belarusian Cup
  - Winners (3): 1992, 1993–94, 2002–03
  - Runners-up (4): 1995–96, 1997–98, 2012–13, 2025–26
- Season Cup / Belarusian Super Cup
  - Winners (2): 1994, 2025

Soviet Union

- Soviet Top League
  - Winners (1): 1982
  - Third place (3): 1954, 1963, 1983
- Soviet Cup
  - Runners-up (2): 1965, 1987
- Federation Cup
  - Runners-up (1): 1989
- Soviet First League
  - Winners (2): 1953, 1956
  - Runners-up (2): 1951, 1975
  - Third place (2): 1974, 1978
- Football Championship of the Belarusian SSR
  - Winners (6): 1937, 1938, 1939, 1945, 1951, 1975
  - Runners-up (5): 1934, 1935, 1946, 1952, 1977
  - Third place (2): 1940, 1947

== Current squad ==
As of 8 September, 2026

No.	Pos.	Nation	Player
1	GK	BLR	Ivan Shimakovich
2	DF	BLR	Matvey Dubatovka
3	DF	BLR	Maksim Shvyatsow
5	MF	BLR	Daniil Dushevskiy
7	MF	BLR	Yevgeny Malashevich
8	MF	BLR	Aleksandr Selyava
9	FW	BLR	Andrey Lutskovich
10	FW	BLR	Karen Vardanyan
11	MF	KGZ	Gulzhigit Alykulov
12	DF	BLR	Alyaksey Ivanow
13	MF	BLR	Vladislav Poloz
16	GK	BLR	Mikhail Kozakevich
17	FW	BLR	Ivan Bakhar
19	MF	CIV	Rayan Guibero

No.	Pos.	Nation	Player
21	GK	BLR	Danila Radkevich
23	MF	BLR	Aleksey Zhechko
24	DF	BLR	Aleksey Vakulich
25	DF	CIV	Abdoul Aziz Toure
26	DF	BLR	Vladislav Kalinin
27	DF	BLR	Mikhail Aleksandrov
30	FW	CAF	Moustapha Djimet
42	MF	NGR	Fawaz Abdullahi
44	DF	BLR	Gleb Gurban
47	GK	BLR	Andrey Kudravets (on loan from Dynamo Moscow)
67	DF	BLR	Roman Begunov
78	MF	BLR	Artem Sokolovskiy
80	FW	CMR	Leonard Gweth

=== Out on loan ===
Note: Flags indicate national team as defined under FIFA eligibility rules; some limited exceptions apply. Players may hold more than one non-FIFA nationality.

No.	Pos.	Nation	Player
—	GK	BLR	Ivan Frolov (at Ostrovets)
18	GK	BLR	Yevgeny Yaroshevich (at Osipovichi)
—	GK	BLR	Artyom Karatay (at Gomel)
97	DF	BLR	Vasily Chernyavsky (at Naftan Novopolotsk)
—	DF	BLR	Timur Dubovik (at Molodechno)
4	DF	BLR	Alyaksey Hawrylovich (at Gomel)
—	DF	BLR	Kirill Kovsh (at Volna Pinsk)

No.	Pos.	Nation	Player
—	DF	BLR	Aleksandr Martysevich (at Niva Dolbizno)
—	MF	BLR	Kirill Adamovich (at Naftan Novopolotsk)
49	MF	BLR	Andrey Denisyuk (at Dnepr Mogilev)
—	MF	BLR	Vladislav Rusakov (at Molodechno)
—	FW	BLR	Matvey Kalinovsky (at Ostrovets)
—	FW	BLR	Artyom Samuylik (at Volna Pinsk)
—	FW	BLR	Artyom Voskoboynikov (at Naftan Novopolotsk)

== Coaching staff ==
Name	Role
(Belarus) Alyaksandr Shahoyka	Head Coach
(Belarus) Alyaksandr Bylina	Assistant Coach
(Belarus) Alyaksandr Hurynovich	Assistant Coach
(Belarus) Alyaksandr Pawlaw	Assistant Coach
(Belarus) Andrey Drozd	Goalkeeping Coach

== Reserves ==
There has been several teams that served as Dinamo Minsk official reserve or farm clubs.

- Dinamo-d Minsk was the club's reserve team which competed in the Soviet Top League (or First League) Reserves championship. In 1992 this reserve team was transformed into Dinamo-2 Minsk, which eventually got promoted to Belarusian Premier League and split into new club Belarus Minsk (later renamed to more commonly known Dinamo-93 Minsk). This club disbanded in 1998.
- Dinamo-Juni Minsk was formed as an outfit for young Dinamo players in 1993 and played in Second League and First League from the 1993–94 season until the end of 2004.
- New Dinamo-2 Minsk was formed 2000. They were active in the Second League during 2000–2002 and again in 2011–2012.
- Bereza-2010 was originally an independent club, which since 2010 formed a partnership with Dinamo, serving as their farm club until the dissolution in late 2015.
- Since 2001 Dinamo is represented by a reserve team in Belarusian Premier League Reserves Championship.

== Notable managers ==
- (Soviet Union) Eduard Malofeyev (1978–83): USSR Championship 1982
- (Belarus) Mikhail Vergeyenko (1991–94): Belarusian Championship 1992, 1992–93, 1993–94
- (Belarus) / (Belarus) Ivan Schyokin: (1994–1997): Belarusian Championship 1994–95, 1995
- (Russia) Anatoly Baidachny (1997): Belarusian Championship 1997
- (Belarus) Yuri Shukanov (2004–05): Belarusian Championship 2004
- (Belarus) Vadim Skripchenko (2022–2025): Belarusian Championship 2023, 2024

== League history ==
Belarus

Season	Level	Pld	W	D	L	Goals	Points	Pos	Domestic Cup
1992	1st	15	11	3	1	38–7	25	1 (16)	Winner
1992–93	1st	32	26	5	1	90–25	57	1 (17)	Semi-finals
1993–94	1st	30	24	4	2	76–20	52	1 (16)	Winner
1994–95	1st	30	20	8	2	83–24	48	1 (16)	Round of 16
1995 (autumn)	1st	15	12	2	1	42–13	38	1 (16)	Round of 16
1996	1st	30	23	6	1	83–20	75	2 (16)	Finals
1997	1st	30	21	7	2	74–24	70	1 (16)	Semi-finals
1998	1st	28	11	6	11	39–38	39	8 (15)	Finals
1999	1st	30	14	9	7	51–30	51	6 (16)	Round of 16
2000	1st	30	19	5	6	49–21	62	3 (16)	Round of 16
2001	1st	26	16	5	5	52–21	53	2 (14)	Semi-finals
2002	1st	26	12	6	8	44–28	42	7 (14)	Quarter-finals
2003	1st	30	20	4	6	62–24	64	3 (16)	Winner
2004	1st	30	24	3	3	64–18	75	1 (16)	Quarter-finals
2005	1st	26	15	5	6	50–26	50	2 (14)	Round of 16
2006	1st	26	15	7	4	44–22	52	2 (14)	Quarter-finals
2007	1st	26	8	11	7	27–28	35	9 (14)	Quarter-finals
2008	1st	30	19	5	6	49–29	62	2 (16)	Semi-finals
2009	1st	26	14	8	4	38–18	50	2 (14)	Round of 16
2010	1st	33	17	5	11	49–34	56	4 (12)	Quarter-finals
2011	1st	33	14	7	12	50–43	49	4 (12)	Round of 16
2012	1st	30	16	8	6	37–19	56	3 (11)	Round of 16
2013	1st	32	15	9	8	44–33	54	3 (12)	Finals
2014	1st	32	18	7	7	44–21	61	2 (12)	Round of 16
2015	1st	26	15	8	3	36–13	53	2 (14)	Semi-finals
2016	1st	30	15	10	5	46–28	55	3 (16)	Quarter-finals
2017	1st	30	22	2	6	46–15	68	2 (16)	Quarter-finals
2018	1st	30	18	9	3	41–17	63	3 (16)	Round of 16
2019	1st	30	15	5	10	43–39	50	4 (16)	Semi-finals
2020	1st	30	16	4	10	38–25	52	6 (16)	Quarter-finals
2021	1st	30	19	5	6	55–20	62	3 (16)	Quarter-finals
2022	1st	30	16	11	3	50–25	59	4 (16)	Quarter-finals
2023	1st	28	22	3	3	72-21	69	1 (15)	Round of 16
2024	1st	30	20	8	2	50-13	68	1 (16)	Semi-finals
2025	1st	30	19	6	5	52-27	63	2 (16)	Round of 16
2026	1st	30							Finals

== European record ==
Accurate as of 14 July 2022

Competition	Played	Won	Drew	Lost	GF	GA	GD	Win%
UEFA Champions League / European Cup	16	5	6	5	20	20	+0	31.25
UEFA Cup Winners' Cup	6	2	3	1	6	4	+2	33.33
UEFA Cup / UEFA Europa League	109	42	22	45	137	141	−4	38.53
UEFA Europa Conference League	12	2	2	8	11	22	−11	16.67
UEFA Intertoto Cup	12	5	3	4	22	13	+9	41.67
Total	155	56	36	63	196	200	−4	36.13

Legend: GF = Goals For. GA = Goals Against. GD = Goal Difference.

Season	Competition	Round		Club	1st Leg	2nd Leg
1983–84	European Cup	1R	(Switzerland)	Grasshopper	1–0 (H)	2–2 (A)
1983–84	European Cup	2R	(Hungary)	Raba ETO	6–3 (A)	3–1 (H)
1983–84	European Cup	QF	(Romania)	Dinamo București	1–1 (H)	0–1 (A)
1984–85	UEFA Cup	1R	(Finland)	HJK Helsinki	4–0 (H)	6–0 (A)
1984–85	UEFA Cup	2R	(Portugal)	Sporting CP	0–2 (A)	2–0 (p. 5–3) (H)
1984–85	UEFA Cup	3R	(Poland)	Widzew Łódź	2–0 (A)	0–1 (H)
1984–85	UEFA Cup	QF	(Socialist Federal Republic of Yugoslavia)	Željezničar Sarajevo	0–2 (A)	1–1 (H)
1986–87	UEFA Cup	1R	(Hungary)	Raba ETO	2–4 (H)	1–0 (A)
1987–88	UEFA Cup Winners' Cup	1R	(Turkey)	Gençlerbirliği	2–0 (H)	2–1 (A)
1987–88	UEFA Cup Winners' Cup	2R	(Spain)	Real Sociedad	1–1 (A)	0–0 (H)
1987–88	UEFA Cup Winners' Cup	QF	(Belgium)	Mechelen	0–1 (A)	1–1 (H)
1988–89	UEFA Cup	1R	(Bulgaria)	Trakia Plovdiv	2–1 (A)	0–0 (H)
1988–89	UEFA Cup	2R	(Romania)	Victoria București	2–1 (H)	0–1 (A)
1993–94	UEFA Champions League	1R	(Germany)	Werder Bremen	2–5 (A)	1–1 (H)
1994–95	UEFA Cup	QR	(Malta)	Hibernians	3–1 (H)	3–4 (a.e.t.) (A)
1994–95	UEFA Cup	1R	(Italy)	Lazio	0–0 (H)	1–4 (A)
1995–96	UEFA Cup	QR	(Romania)	Universitatea Craiova	0–0 (A)	0–0 (p. 3–1) (H)
1995–96	UEFA Cup	1R	(Austria)	Austria Wien	2–1 (A)	1–0 (H)
1995–96	UEFA Cup	2R	(Germany)	Werder Bremen	0–5 (A)	2–1 (H)
1996–97	UEFA Cup	1Q	(Republic of Ireland)	Bohemian	1–1 (A)	0–0 (H)
1996–97	UEFA Cup	2Q	(Turkey)	Beşiktaş	2–1 (H)	0–2 (A)
1997–98	UEFA Cup	1Q	(Georgia (country))	Kolkheti-1913 Poti	1–0 (H)	1–2 (A)
1997–98	UEFA Cup	2Q	(Norway)	Lillestrøm	0–2 (H)	0–1 (A)
1998–99	UEFA Champions League	1Q	(Latvia)	Skonto Riga	0–0 (A)	1–2 (H)
2001	UEFA Intertoto Cup	1R	(Luxembourg)	Hobscheid	6–0 (H)	1–1 (A)
2001	UEFA Intertoto Cup	2R	(Israel)	Hapoel Haifa	2–0 (H)	1–0 (A)
2001	UEFA Intertoto Cup	3R	(Germany)	Wolfsburg	3–4 (A)	0–0 (H)
2002–03	UEFA Cup	QR	(Bulgaria)	CSKA Sofia	1–4 (H)	0–1 (A)
2003–04	UEFA Cup	QR	(Denmark)	Brøndby	0–3 (A)	0–2 (H)
2004	UEFA Intertoto Cup	1R	(Poland)	Odra Wodzisław	0–1 (A)	2–0 (H)
2004	UEFA Intertoto Cup	2R	(Serbia and Montenegro)	Sartid Smederevo	1–2 (H)	3–1 (a.e.t.) (A)
2004	UEFA Intertoto Cup	3R	(France)	Lille	1–2 (A)	2–2 (H)
2005–06	UEFA Champions League	1Q	(Cyprus)	Anorthosis	1–1 (H)	0–1 (A)
2006–07	UEFA Cup	1Q	(Poland)	Zagłębie Lubin	1–1 (A)	0–0 (H)
2006–07	UEFA Cup	2Q	(Slovakia)	Artmedia Petržalka	1–2 (A)	2–3 (H)
2007–08	UEFA Cup	1Q	(Latvia)	Skonto Riga	1–1 (A)	2–0 (H)
2007–08	UEFA Cup	2Q	(Denmark)	Odense	1–1 (H)	0–4 (A)
2009–10	UEFA Europa League	1Q	(North Macedonia)	Renova	2–1 (H)	1–1 (A)
2009–10	UEFA Europa League	2Q	(Norway)	Tromsø	0–0 (H)	1–4 (A)
2010–11	UEFA Europa League	2Q	(Estonia)	Sillamäe Kalev	5–1 (H)	5–0 (A)
2010–11	UEFA Europa League	3Q	(Israel)	Maccabi Haifa	0–1 (A)	3–1 (H)
2010–11	UEFA Europa League	PO	(Belgium)	Club Brugge	1–2 (A)	2–3 (H)
2013–14	UEFA Europa League	1Q	(Lithuania)	Kruoja Pakruojis	3–0 (A)	5–0 (H)
2013–14	UEFA Europa League	2Q	(Croatia)	Lokomotiva Zagreb	1–2 (H)	3–2 (A)
2013–14	UEFA Europa League	3Q	(Turkey)	Trabzonspor	0–1 (H)	0–0 (A)
2014–15	UEFA Europa League	2Q	(Finland)	MyPa	3–0 (H)	0–0 (A)
2014–15	UEFA Europa League	3Q	(Romania)	CFR Cluj	1–0 (H)	2–0 (A)
2014–15	UEFA Europa League	PO	(Portugal)	Nacional	2–0 (H)	3–2 (A)
2014–15	UEFA Europa League	Group K	(Greece)	PAOK	1–6 (A)	0–2 (H)
2014–15	UEFA Europa League	Group K	(Italy)	Fiorentina	0–3 (H)	2–1 (A)
2014–15	UEFA Europa League	Group K	(France)	Guingamp	0–0 (H)	0–2 (A)
2015–16	UEFA Europa League	2Q	(Bulgaria)	Cherno More	1–1 (A)	4–0 (H)
2015–16	UEFA Europa League	3Q	(Switzerland)	Zürich	1–0 (A)	1–1 (a.e.t.) (H)
2015–16	UEFA Europa League	PO	(Austria)	Red Bull Salzburg	2–0 (H)	0–2 (p. 3–2) (A)
2015–16	UEFA Europa League	Group E	(Czech Republic)	Viktoria Plzeň	0–2 (A)	1–0 (H)
2015–16	UEFA Europa League	Group E	(Austria)	Rapid Wien	0–1 (H)	1–2 (A)
2015–16	UEFA Europa League	Group E	(Spain)	Villarreal	0–4 (A)	1–2 (H)
2016–17	UEFA Europa League	1Q	(Latvia)	Spartaks Jūrmala	2–1 (H)	2–0 (A)
2016–17	UEFA Europa League	2Q	(Republic of Ireland)	St Patrick's Athletic	1–1 (H)	1–0 (A)
2016–17	UEFA Europa League	3Q	(Serbia)	Vojvodina	1–1 (A)	0–2 (H)
2017–18	UEFA Europa League	1Q	(Faroe Islands)	NSÍ Runavík	2–1 (H)	2–0 (A)
2017–18	UEFA Europa League	2Q	(North Macedonia)	Rabotnički	1–1 (A)	3–0 (H)
2017–18	UEFA Europa League	3Q	(Cyprus)	AEK Larnaca	0–2 (A)	1–1 (H)
2018–19	UEFA Europa League	1Q	(Republic of Ireland)	Derry City	2–0 (A)	1–2 (H)
2018–19	UEFA Europa League	2Q	(Slovakia)	Dunajská Streda	3–1 (A)	4–1 (H)
2018–19	UEFA Europa League	3Q	(Russia)	Zenit Saint Petersburg	4–0 (H)	1–8 (a.e.t) (A)
2019–20	UEFA Europa League	1Q	(Latvia)	Liepāja	1–1 (A)	1–2 (H)
2020–21	UEFA Europa League	1Q	(Poland)	Piast Gliwice	0–2 (H)	—N/a
2022–23	UEFA Europa Conference League	1Q	(Montenegro)	Dečić	1–1 (H)	2–1 (A)
2022–23	UEFA Europa Conference League	2Q	(Israel)	Hapoel Be'er Sheva	1–2 (A)	0–1 (H)
2023–24	UEFA Europa Conference League	1Q	(Bosnia and Herzegovina)	Željezničar	2–2 (A)	1–2 (H)
2024–25	UEFA Champions League	1Q	(Armenia)	Pyunik	0–0 (H)	1–0 (A)
2024–25	UEFA Champions League	2Q	(Bulgaria)	Ludogorets Razgrad	0−2 (A)	1−0 (H)
2024–25	UEFA Europa League	3Q	(Gibraltar)	Lincoln Red Imps	2–0 (H)	1–2 (A)
2024–25	UEFA Europa League	PO	(Belgium)	Anderlecht	0–1 (H)	0–1 (A)
2024–25	UEFA Conference League	League Phase	(Scotland)	Heart of Midlothian	1–2 (H)	—N/a
2024–25	UEFA Conference League	League Phase	(Finland)	HJK Helsinki	0–1 (A)	—N/a
2024–25	UEFA Conference League	League Phase	(Poland)	Legia Warsaw	0–4 (A)	—N/a
2024–25	UEFA Conference League	League Phase	(Denmark)	Copenhagen	1–2 (H)	—N/a
2024–25	UEFA Conference League	League Phase	(Northern Ireland)	Larne	2–0 (H)	—N/a
2024–25	UEFA Conference League	League Phase	(Greece)	Panathinaikos	0–4 (A)	—N/a
2025–26	UEFA Champions League	1Q	(Bulgaria)	Ludogorets Razgrad	0−1 (A)	2−2 (a.e.t) (H)
2025–26	UEFA Conference League	2Q	(Albania)	Egnatia	0–2 (H)	0–1 (A)
2026–27	UEFA Conference League	1Q	(North Macedonia)	Sileks	0–1 (H)	1−0 (p. 6–5) (A)
2026–27	UEFA Conference League	2Q	(Azerbaijan)	Neftçi	4−2 (A)	0–1 (H)
2026–27	UEFA Conference League	3Q	(Portugal)	Braga		
