= List of Belarusian football transfers summer 2026 =

This is a list of Belarusian football transfers in the 2026 summer transfer window by club. Only clubs of the 2026 Belarusian Premier League are included.

== Belarusian Premier League 2026 ==
=== Arsenal Dzerzhinsk ===
In:

No.	Pos.	Nation	Player
11	FW	RUS	Dzambolat Tsallagov (from (Russia) Alania Vladikavkaz)
69	MF	RUS	Roman Yermolin (from (Russia) Tekstilshchik Ivanovo)
71	MF	RUS	Maksim Matveev (from (Russia) Kolomna)
79	MF	RUS	Khetag Badoev

Out:

No.	Pos.	Nation	Player
11	MF	BLR	Yury Lovets (to (Kyrgyzstan) Bishkek City)
17	MF	BLR	Pavel Kotlyarov (end of loan from Slavia Mozyr)
95	MF	BLR	Ivan Vorobyov (to Unixlabs Minsk)
99	FW	BLR	Ivan Tolkachyov (on loan to Unixlabs Minsk)

=== Baranovichi ===
In:

No.	Pos.	Nation	Player
6	MF	KAZ	Alibi Tuzakbaev (from (Kazakhstan) Turan)
22	MF	BLR	Mikhail Bondarenko (on loan from Dynamo Brest)
45	FW	KAZ	Ersultan Torekul (from (Kazakhstan) Taraz)
88	MF	BLR	Zakhar Gitselev (from Dnepr Mogilev)
96	MF	BLR	Valery Potorocha (from Bumprom Gomel)
97	DF	BLR	Timofey Tkachyov (from Dnepr Mogilev)

Out:

No.	Pos.	Nation	Player
3	DF	RUS	Konstantin Shcherbakov
20	FW	BLR	Bogdan Gusev (to Unixlabs Minsk)
27	MF	BLR	Tigran Sarkisyan (to BATE Borisov)
41	MF	BLR	Dmitry Volkovets (end of loan from Dynamo Brest)
45	FW	KAZ	Aldiyar Altayev
98	DF	BLR	Matvey Svidinsky (to Unixlabs Minsk)
—	MF	BLR	Kirill Kirkitsky (to Naftan Novopolotsk)

=== BATE Borisov ===
In:

No.	Pos.	Nation	Player
13	MF	RUS	Yaroslav Khramtsevich (from Unixlabs Minsk)
17	MF	BLR	Yury Kavalyow (from (Russia) Baltika Kaliningrad)
19	FW	MNE	Luka Đorđević
21	FW	BLR	Marat Titov (from ABFF Academy)
23	DF	RUS	Nikolai Bochko (from (Russia) Tekstilshchik Ivanovo)
26	MF	BLR	Vladislav Varaksa (from Minsk)
30	MF	RUS	Taras Gagloev (from (Russia) Alania Vladikavkaz)
37	FW	HON	Erick Puerto (on loan from (Honduras) Platense)
47	MF	BLR	Ales Sakhonchik (end of loan to Molodechno)
51	GK	RUS	Aleksandr Ryabinkin (from (Russia) Tekstilshchik Ivanovo)
55	MF	BLR	Kirill Kaplenko (from Dinamo Minsk)
—	FW	BLR	Maksim Kunsky (end of loan to (Russia) Saturn Ramenskoye)
—	MF	BLR	Tigran Sarkisyan (from Baranovichi)

Out:

No.	Pos.	Nation	Player
3	DF	CMR	Christian Intsoen (to Smorgon)
9	FW	BLR	Nikolay Mirsky (on loan to Unixlabs Minsk)
15	MF	BLR	Gleb Protasenya (to Gomel)
17	MF	BLR	Anton Kavalyow (end of loan from (Russia) Fakel Voronezh)
19	DF	BLR	Ivan Chernykh (on loan to Molodechno)
23	DF	BLR	Ilya Rashchenya (to Slavia Mozyr)
29	FW	CIV	Yao Jean Charles (to (Kuwait) Al-Jazeera)
30	FW	BLR	Anatoliy Yarmolich (to Slavia Mozyr)
32	GK	BLR	Syarhey Chernik
44	FW	BLR	Maksim Mardas (on loan to Gomel)

=== Belshina Bobruisk ===
In:

No.	Pos.	Nation	Player
6	DF	RUS	Daniil Lazarev (from (Russia) Torpedo Vladimir)
7	FW	BLR	Arseniy Achapovskiy (on loan from Gomel)
11	MF	GAB	Shorla Aboghe (from (Gabon) Vantour)
27	FW	RUS	Luka Zgursky (from (Tajikistan) Istiklol)
78	DF	BLR	Gleb Yakushevich (from (Russia) Khimik Dzerzhinsk)

Out:

No.	Pos.	Nation	Player
11	FW	RUS	Timur Galimzyanov (to Naftan Novopolotsk)
20	FW	BLR	Vladislav Kabachevsky (to Smorgon)
27	MF	RUS	Nikita Rozmanov
44	DF	BLR	Semyon Shestilovsky
77	FW	BLR	Ivan Veras (to (Indonesia) Persiku Kudus)

=== Dynamo Brest ===
In:

No.	Pos.	Nation	Player
3	DF	RUS	Kirill Glushchenkov (from (Kazakhstan) Tobol)
4	MF	MNE	Žarko Popović (from (Montenegro) Petrovac)
21	GK	BLR	Alyaksandr Nyachayew (from (Tajikistan) Khujand)
23	DF	BLR	Vladislav Lyakh (from (Russia) Spartak Kostroma)

Out:

No.	Pos.	Nation	Player
8	MF	RUS	Aleksandr Lomakin (end of loan from (Russia) Torpedo Moscow)
15	DF	RUS	Maks Dziov (end of loan from (Russia) Fakel Voronezh)
20	MF	BLR	Mikhail Bondarenko (on loan to Baranovichi)
—	DF	BLR	Daniil Narchuk (to Unixlabs Minsk, previously on loan)
—	DF	BLR	Ilya Sedro (on loan to Volna Pinsk)
—	MF	BLR	Dmitry Volkovets (on loan to Molodechno, previously on loan at Baranovichi)

=== Dinamo Minsk ===
In:

No.	Pos.	Nation	Player
5	MF	BLR	Daniil Dushevskiy (from (Russia) Leningradets Leningrad Oblast)
19	MF	CIV	Rayan Guibero (from (Turkey) Serikspor)
44	DF	BLR	Gleb Gurban (from (Russia) SKA-Khabarovsk)
47	GK	BLR	Andrey Kudravets (on loan from (Russia) Dynamo Moscow)
—	GK	BLR	Nikita Petrashko (end of loan to Osipovichi)

Out:

No.	Pos.	Nation	Player
19	MF	BLR	Dmitry Podstrelov (to (Kazakhstan) Altai)
22	MF	BLR	Yegor Molchan (to (Croatia) Dinamo Zagreb)
33	DF	BLR	Sergey Karpovich (end of loan from Maxline Vitebsk)
55	MF	BLR	Kirill Kaplenko (to BATE Borisov)
99	MF	BLR	Kirill Tsepenkov (to Dnepr Mogilev)
—	GK	BLR	Yevgeny Yaroshevich (on loan to Osipovichi)
—	MF	BLR	Vladislav Rusakov (on loan to Molodechno)
—	FW	BLR	Artyom Voskoboynikov (on loan to Naftan Novopolotsk)

=== Dnepr Mogilev ===
In:

No.	Pos.	Nation	Player
3	DF	SRB	Nenad Perović (from Torpedo-BelAZ Zhodino)
5	DF	RUS	Artyom Varganov (from (Russia) Kuban Krasnodar)
7	MF	BLR	Muzaffar Gurbanov (end of loan to Naftan Novopolotsk)
11	MF	BLR	Dmitry Lisakovich (from Gomel)
18	DF	BLR	Aleksandr Mikhalenko (from (Kyrgyzstan) Asiagoal Bishkek)
33	GK	BLR	Andrey Sinenko (from (Azerbaijan) İmişli)
37	MF	BLR	Kirill Tsepenkov (from Dinamo Minsk)
66	FW	RUS	Nikita Tereshchuk (on loan from (Russia) Leningradets Leningrad Oblast)
71	MF	BLR	Daniil Zhabrakov (end of loan to Smorgon)
74	DF	RUS	David Cherkasov (on loan from (Russia) Baltika Kaliningrad)
—	GK	BLR	Andrey Ignatovich

Out:

No.	Pos.	Nation	Player
1	GK	BLR	Uladzislaw Ihnatsyew (to Slavia Mozyr)
7	DF	BLR	Timofey Tkachyov (to Baranovichi)
11	FW	BLR	Timofey Martynov (end of loan from (Russia) Orenburg)
12	DF	BLR	Nikita Bylinkin (to Slutsk)
14	DF	RUS	Yegor Burkhin (end of loan from (Russia) Torpedo Moscow)
18	DF	BLR	Andrey Shamruk (to Slavia Mozyr)
33	MF	BLR	Zakhar Gitselev (to Baranovichi)
38	MF	BLR	Makar Litskevich (to Slutsk)
47	MF	BLR	Gleb Malashenko (on loan to Smorgon)

=== Gomel ===
In:

No.	Pos.	Nation	Player
5	MF	BLR	Gleb Protasenya (from BATE Borisov)
7	MF	NGR	Raymond Adeola (from (Turkey) Serikspor)
13	FW	BLR	Maksim Mardas (on loan from BATE Borisov)
23	MF	RUS	Kirill Danilin (from (Russia) Akron Tolyatti, previously on loan)
77	MF	RUS	Vladislav Lazarev (from (Russia) Sokol Saratov)

Out:

No.	Pos.	Nation	Player
7	FW	BLR	Arseniy Achapovskiy (on loan to Belshina Bobruisk)
13	MF	BLR	Dmitry Lisakovich (to Dnepr Mogilev)
77	MF	BLR	Aleksandr Savitsky (on loan to Naftan Novopolotsk)

=== Isloch Minsk Raion ===
In:

No.	Pos.	Nation	Player
4	DF	BLR	Artyom Shulunov (from ABFF Academy)
11	FW	BLR	Timofey Martynov (on loan from (Russia) Orenburg, previously on loan at Dnepr Mogilev)
13	DF	NGR	Godfrey Bitok (from (Kazakhstan) Irtysh Pavlodar)
74	MF	BLR	Mikhail Sachkovskiy (from Slavia Mozyr)
88	MF	RUS	Nikita Fadeev (from (Russia) Torpedo Miass)

Out:

No.	Pos.	Nation	Player
9	FW	RUS	Bogdan Tsybrov (end of loan from (Russia) Lokomotiv Moscow)
11	MF	KGZ	Nurdoolot Stalbekov (to (Kyrgyzstan) Uzgen)
14	DF	BLR	Artyom Poluyanov (on loan to Lida)
20	DF	BLR	Aleh Veratsila (retired)
27	MF	ROU	Davide Popșa (to (Romania) Sighetu Marmației)

=== Maxline Vitebsk ===
In:

No.	Pos.	Nation	Player
5	DF	IRI	Milad Mohammadi (from (Iran) Persepolis)
8	DF	CIV	Silas Gnaka (from (Germany) 1. FC Magdeburg)
10	MF	NED	Denilho Cleonise (from (Netherlands) RKC Waalwijk)
12	MF	SRB	Radivoj Bosić (from (Serbia) TSC)
21	DF	BLR	Nikita Naumov (from Vitebsk)
90	FW	BLR	Ivan Grudko (on loan from Slavia Mozyr, previously on loan at Bumprom Gomel)
—	DF	BLR	Sergey Karpovich (end of loan to Dinamo Minsk)
—	MF	BLR	Viktor Lisovsky (from SKA-1938 Minsk)
—	DF	BLR	Yegor Osipov

Out:

No.	Pos.	Nation	Player
10	FW	ITA	Saliou Thioune (to (Malta) Hamrun Spartans, previously on loan at Naftan Novopolotsk)
14	MF	BLR	Ruslan Lisakovich (on loan to Neman Grodno)
17	MF	BLR	Daniil Galyata (on loan to (Cyprus) Aris Limassol)
21	MF	RUS	Nikita Glushkov (to (Russia) Arsenal Tula)
25	DF	BLR	Nikita Bykov (on loan to Orsha)

=== Minsk ===
In:

No.	Pos.	Nation	Player
4	DF	BLR	Ruslan Khadarkevich (from (Kazakhstan) Irtysh Pavlodar)
7	FW	SEN	Honore Gomis (from (Kazakhstan) Kyzylzhar)
10	MF	BLR	Gleb Zherdev (from Slavia Mozyr)
88	DF	SLE	Abdoulie Jarjue Kabia (from (Georgia (country)) Samgurali Tskaltubo)

Out:

No.	Pos.	Nation	Player
4	DF	KOR	Park Ji-hun
10	MF	BLR	Vladislav Varaksa (to BATE Borisov)
14	MF	KGZ	Emir Ernisov
16	GK	RUS	Sergei Yeshchenko (to (Russia) Kaluga)
49	MF	BLR	Zakhar Drachev (to (Turkey) Beşiktaş J.K.)
55	DF	BLR	Aleksey Tumanov (on loan to Naftan Novopolotsk)

=== Naftan Novopolotsk ===
In:

No.	Pos.	Nation	Player
7	DF	BLR	Aleksey Tumanov (on loan from Minsk)
8	DF	RUS	Andrey Stefanishin (from (Russia) Rodina-2 Moscow)
10	MF	BLR	Aleksandr Savitsky (on loan from Gomel)
16	GK	UKR	Denys Shelikhov (from Slavia Mozyr)
16	GK	BLR	Denis Sadovsky (from Bumprom Gomel)
17	MF	BLR	Vladislav Krolik (on loan from Torpedo-BelAZ Zhodino)
21	MF	BLR	Kirill Kirkitsky (from Baranovichi)
22	MF	BLR	Vladislav Fezhenko (from Unixlabs Minsk)
30	FW	KAZ	Marlen Aymanov (from (Kazakhstan) Turan)
57	FW	RUS	Timur Galimzyanov (from Belshina Bobruisk)
69	DF	RUS	Roman Khadzhiev (from (Uzbekistan) Mash'al)
94	FW	BLR	Artyom Voskoboynikov (on loan from Dinamo Minsk)
—	GK	RUS	Maksim Yurchenko (from (Russia) SShOR Khimki)

Out:

No.	Pos.	Nation	Player
3	DF	BLR	Nikita Kostomarov (to (Kyrgyzstan) Neftchi Kochkor-Ata)
4	DF	UZB	Shakhzod Abrorov (previously from (United Arab Emirates) United Sport)
7	MF	RUS	Shamil Gadzhiyev (end of loan from (Russia) Dynamo Makhachkala)
8	FW	BLR	Dmitry Latykhov (to Bumprom Gomel)
17	MF	BLR	Alyaksandr Aleksandrovich (to Orsha)
21	MF	BLR	Muzaffar Gurbanov (end of loan from Dnepr Mogilev)
22	DF	BLR	Matvey Pritsker (end of loan from Torpedo-BelAZ Zhodino)
39	DF	RUS	Denis Fedorenko (to Slavia Mozyr)
70	FW	ITA	Saliou Thioune (end of loan from Maxline Vitebsk)

=== Neman Grodno ===
In:

No.	Pos.	Nation	Player
7	FW	SRB	Andrija Ratković (from (Serbia) Dubočica)
10	MF	BLR	Ruslan Lisakovich (on loan from Maxline Vitebsk)
59	FW	BLR	Artyom Devyaten (end of loan to Smorgon)

Out:

No.	Pos.	Nation	Player
7	MF	BLR	Alfred Mazurich (on loan to Lida)
10	MF	KGZ	Gulzhigit Borubaev (to (Kyrgyzstan) Dordoi Bishkek)
28	MF	BLR	Bogdan Levchenko (on loan to Molodechno)
62	FW	BLR	Mikhail Gordeychuk (to Niva Dolbizno)
—	MF	BLR	Marat Vasilkevich (on loan to Osipovichi, previously on loan at Slutsk)

=== Slavia Mozyr ===
In:

No.	Pos.	Nation	Player
2	DF	BLR	Andrey Shamruk (from Dnepr Mogilev)
4	DF	BLR	Ilya Rashchenya (from BATE Borisov)
7	MF	BLR	Nikita Romanov (from (Russia) Rostov-2)
9	MF	UKR	Oleksandr Batishchev (from Torpedo-BelAZ Zhodino)
14	DF	RUS	Denis Fedorenko (from Naftan Novopolotsk)
15	FW	BLR	Anatoliy Yarmolich (from BATE Borisov)
23	GK	BLR	Uladzislaw Ihnatsyew (from Dnepr Mogilev)
88	DF	RUS	Dmitri Yashin (from (Kazakhstan) Atyrau)

Out:

No.	Pos.	Nation	Player
2	DF	BLR	Arseny Ageyev (end of loan from (Russia) Lokomotiv Moscow)
4	DF	RUS	Ilya Kalachyov (to (Russia) Sokol Saratov)
5	MF	BLR	Mikhail Sachkovskiy (to Isloch Minsk Raion)
7	MF	BLR	Gleb Zherdev (to Minsk)
15	FW	BLR	Dmitry Vashkevich (to Lida)
22	MF	BLR	Anton Lukashov (to (Russia) Orenburg)
23	GK	UKR	Denys Shelikhov (to Naftan Novopolotsk)
—	FW	BLR	Ivan Grudko (on loan to Maxline Vitebsk, previously on loan at Bumprom Gomel)
—	MF	BLR	Pavel Kotlyarov (on loan to Slutsk, previously on loan at Slavia Mozyr)

=== Torpedo-BelAZ Zhodino ===
In:

No.	Pos.	Nation	Player
9	FW	ARM	Grenik Petrosyan (from (Armenia) BKMA Yerevan)
10	MF	BLR	Timofey Sharkovsky (from (Moldova) Zimbru Chișinău)
11	MF	RUS	Aleksandr Lomovitsky (from (Russia) Rubin Kazan)
12	MF	BRA	Pedro Acácio (from (Ukraine) UCSA Tarasivka)
15	MF	BLR	Roman Zheleznyi (end of loan to Lida)
18	MF	BLR	Nikita Korzun (from (Kazakhstan) Aktobe)
28	FW	UKR	Dmytro Yusov (from (Kazakhstan) Atyrau)
66	DF	BLR	Arseny Ageyev (on loan from (Russia) Lokomotiv Moscow, previously on loan at Slavia Mozyr)
—	DF	BLR	Eduard Korostelyov (end of loan to Lida)
—	DF	BLR	Matvey Pritsker (end of loan to Naftan Novopolotsk)

Out:

No.	Pos.	Nation	Player
2	MF	CIV	Mohamed Lamine Bamba (to (Armenia) Pyunik)
9	MF	UKR	Oleksandr Batishchev (to Slavia Mozyr)
10	FW	BLR	Vitaly Lisakovich (to (Kazakhstan) Tobol)
17	MF	BLR	Vladislav Krolik (on loan to Naftan Novopolotsk)
21	FW	BLR	Vadim Kiselyov (on loan to Unixlabs Minsk)
29	FW	NGR	Steven Alfred (to (Armenia) Pyunik)
90	DF	SRB	Nenad Perović (to Dnepr Mogilev)

=== Vitebsk ===
In:

No.	Pos.	Nation	Player
11	MF	BLR	Artyom Gurenko (from (Russia) Leningradets Leningrad Oblast)
—	FW	BLR	Nikita Vekhtev (end of loan to Orsha)

Out:

No.	Pos.	Nation	Player
12	GK	BLR	Dzmitry Kharytonaw (to (Kyrgyzstan) Neftchi Kochkor-Ata)
23	DF	BLR	Nikita Naumov (to Maxline Vitebsk)
33	DF	BLR	Yaroslav Makushinsky (to Bumprom Gomel)
