= 2027 UEFA European Under-21 Championship qualification Group I =

Football tournament qualification stage

Group I of the 2027 UEFA European Under-21 Championship qualifying competition consists of five teams: Denmark, Belgium, Austria, Wales, and Belarus. The composition of the nine groups in the qualifying group stage was decided by the draw held on 6 February 2025 at the UEFA headquarters in Nyon, Switzerland, with the teams seeded according to their coefficient ranking.

== Standings ==
Pos	Team	Pld	W	D	L	GF	GA	GD	Pts	Qualification	Belgium	Denmark	Austria	Wales	Belarus
1	Belgium	8	5	2	1	13	2	+11	17	Final tournament	—	2–0	1–0	1–0	1–0
2	Denmark	8	4	3	1	15	6	+9	15	Play-offs	0–0	—	1–1	4–0	2–0
3	Austria	8	4	2	2	15	9	+6	14		1–0	1–1	—	0–2	2–1
4	Wales	8	2	0	6	7	28	−21	6		0–7	2–6	1–7	—	2–0
5	Belarus	8	1	1	6	7	12	−5	4		1–1	0–1	2–3	3–0	—

Source: UEFA
Rules for classification: Tiebreakers

== Matches ==
Times are CET/CEST, (Note: CEST (UTC+2) for matches until 26 October 2025 and from 29 March 2026 (matchday 1–3 and 7–10), and CET (UTC+1) for matches from 26 October 2025 to 29 March 2026 (matchday 4–6).) as listed by UEFA (local times, if different, are in parentheses).

4 September 2025
17:00 (19:00 UTC+4)

Belarus	1–1	Belgium
Simanenka 90+1'	Report	Bassette 39'

Tengiz Burjanadze Stadium, Gori (Georgia) (Note: Due to Belarusian involvement in the Russian invasion of Ukraine, Belarus are required to play their home matches at neutral venues, and behind closed doors, until further notice.)
Attendance: 0
Referee: Aleko Aptsiauri (Georgia)

8 September 2025
18:00 (20:00 UTC+4)

Belarus	2–3	Austria
Myalkovskiy 25'; Tsepenkov 46'	Report	Heindl 20', 22'; Puczka 52' (pen.)

Tengiz Burjanadze Stadium, Gori (Georgia)
Attendance: 0
Referee: Snir Levy (Israel)
8 September 2025
20:30 (19:30 UTC+1)

Wales	2–6	Denmark
Nyakuhwa 1'; Popov 28'	Report	Jørgensen 32'; Daghim 47'; Harder 63'; Schwartau 74'; Priske 82'; Andersen 84'

Rodney Parade, Newport
Attendance: 1,070
Referee: Joonas Jaanovits (Estonia)

10 October 2025
18:00

Denmark	1–1	Austria
Andersen 58'	Report	Puczka 45+1' (pen.)

Vejle Stadium, Vejle
Attendance: 1,775
Referee: David Smajc (Slovenia)
10 October 2025
20:30 (19:30 UTC+1)

Wales	0–7	Belgium
	Report	Mokio 4'; Stassin 40', 65'; Vermant 49'; Moreira 69'; Bassette 84' (pen.); Adedeji-Sternberg 90+2'

Rodney Parade, Newport
Attendance: 859
Referee: Ante Culina (Croatia)

14 October 2025
18:00

Austria	0–2	Wales
	Report	Biancheri 25'; Popov 90'

Donauparkstadion, Linz
Attendance: 1,850
Referee: Patryk Gryckiewicz (Poland)
14 October 2025
20:00

Belgium	2–0	Denmark
Bassette 80'; Stassin 90+3'	Report

Het Kuipje, Westerlo
Attendance: 3,342
Referee: Mihály Káprály (Hungary)

14 November 2025
18:00

Austria	1–0	Belgium
Kojzek 83'	Report

Josko Arena, Ried im Innkreis
Attendance: 2,285
Referee: Alexandros Tsakalidis (Greece)
14 November 2025
15:00 (18:00 UTC+4)

Belarus	3–0	Wales
Myalkovskiy 14'; Tsepenkov 49'; Pechura 73'	Report

Tengiz Burjanadze Stadium, Gori, Georgia
Attendance: 0
Referee: Daniyar Sakhi (Kazakhstan)

18 November 2025
15:00 (18:00 UTC+4)

Belarus	0–1	Denmark
	Report	Bischoff 47'

Tengiz Burjanadze Stadium, Gori, Georgia
Attendance: 0
Referee: Giorgi Avazashvili (Georgia)

27 March 2026
18:30 (17:30 UTC+0)

Wales	2–0	Belarus
Biancheri 15'; Harris 41'	Report

Rodney Parade, Newport
Attendance: 802
Referee: Jóhan Hendrik Ellefsen (Faroe Islands)
27 March 2026
20:00

Belgium	1–0	Austria
Vermeeren 88'	Report

Den Dreef, Leuven
Attendance: 2,453
Referee: Joonas Jaanovits (Estonia)

31 March 2026
18:00

Denmark	4–0	Wales
Daghim 17'; Bischoff 39'; Harder 42'; Priske 86'	Report

Vejle Stadium, Vejle
Attendance: 2,424
Referee: Matteo Marcenaro (Italy)
31 March 2026
18:00

Austria	2–1	Belarus
Wurmbrand 62'; Schuster 90+4'	Report	Melnichenko 88'

BWT X Upper Austrian Arena, Ried im Innkreis
Attendance: 1,223
Referee: Márton Rúsz (Hungary)

24 September 2026
20:00

Belgium	1–0	Belarus
Bassette 70' (pen.)	Report

Het Kuipje, Westerlo
Attendance: 1,686
Referee: Martin Velikov (Bulgaria)

28 September 2026
18:30

Denmark	2–0	Belarus
Harder 55', 61'	Report

Vejle Stadium, Vejle
Attendance: 2,238
Referee: Duncan Nicolson (Scotland)
29 September 2026
20:00

Belgium	1–0	Wales
Bassette 7'	Report

Het Kuipje, Westerlo
Attendance: 2,363
Referee: Jan Všetečka (Czech Republic)

2 October 2026
18:00

Austria	1–1	Denmark
Kojzek 69'	Report	Harder 50'

Sportclub-Platz, Vienna
Attendance: 2,674
Referee: Snir Levy (Israel)

6 October 2026
18:30

Denmark	0–0	Belgium
	Report

Vejle Stadium, Vejle
Attendance: 3,600
Referee: Igor Bosca (Moldova)
6 October 2026
18:30

Wales	1–7	Austria
Agius 30'	Report	Weinhandl 3'; Hödl 20'; Puczka 41'; Adewumi 56'; Anyadike 71' (o.g.); Kojzek 84' (pen.); Schuster 86'

The Oval, Caernarfon
Attendance: 1,360
Referee: Mateo Erceg (Croatia)

== Goalscorers ==
There were 57 goals scored in 20 matches, for an average of 2.85 goals per match.

5 goals

- (Belgium national under-21 football team) Norman Bassette
- (Denmark national under-21 football team) Conrad Harder

3 goals

- (Austria national under-21 football team) Erik Kojzek
- (Austria national under-21 football team) David Puczka
- (Belgium national under-21 football team) Lucas Stassin

2 goals

- (Austria national under-21 football team) David Heindl
- (Austria national under-21 football team) Jannik Schuster
- (Belarus national under-21 football team) Ruslan Myalkovskiy
- (Belarus national under-21 football team) Kirill Tsepenkov
- (Denmark national under-21 football team) Silas Andersen
- (Denmark national under-21 football team) Clement Bischoff
- (Denmark national under-21 football team) Adam Daghim
- (Denmark national under-21 football team) August Priske
- (Wales national under-21 football team) Gabriele Biancheri
- (Wales national under-21 football team) Chris Popov

1 goal

- (Austria national under-21 football team) Oluwaseun Adewumi
- (Austria national under-21 football team) Jacob Hödl
- (Austria national under-21 football team) Luca Weinhandl
- (Austria national under-21 football team) Nikolaus Wurmbrand
- (Belarus national under-21 football team) Trofim Melnichenko
- (Belarus national under-21 football team) Rodion Pechura
- (Belarus national under-21 football team) Timofey Simanenka
- (Belgium national under-21 football team) Noah Adedeji-Sternberg
- (Belgium national under-21 football team) Jorthy Mokio
- (Belgium national under-21 football team) Diego Moreira
- (Belgium national under-21 football team) Romeo Vermant
- (Belgium national under-21 football team) Arthur Vermeeren
- (Denmark national under-21 football team) Thomas Jørgensen
- (Denmark national under-21 football team) Oscar Schwartau
- (Wales national under-21 football team) Calum Agius
- (Wales national under-21 football team) Archie Harris
- (Wales national under-21 football team) Tanatswa Nyakuhwa

1 own goal

- (Wales national under-21 football team) Noah Anyadike (against Austria)
