= 2025–26 in Danish football =

Football in Denmark
- Season: 2025–26

The 2025–26 season is the 133rd competitive association football season in Denmark.

== Domestic leagues ==
=== Men's football ===
==== Superliga ====
Pos	Team	Pld	W	D	L	GF	GA	GD	Pts	Qualification
1	AGF	22	15	5	2	46	23	+23	50	Qualification for the Championship round
2	Midtjylland	22	13	7	2	58	23	+35	46	Qualification for the Championship round
3	Sønderjyske	22	10	6	6	34	28	+6	36	Qualification for the Championship round
4	Brøndby	22	10	4	8	31	22	+9	34	Qualification for the Championship round
5	Viborg	22	10	3	9	37	35	+2	33	Qualification for the Championship round
6	Nordsjælland	22	10	1	11	37	39	−2	31	Qualification for the Championship round
7	Copenhagen	22	8	5	9	35	34	+1	29	Qualification for the Relegation round
8	OB	22	7	6	9	36	46	−10	27	Qualification for the Relegation round
9	Randers	22	7	5	10	22	27	−5	26	Qualification for the Relegation round
10	Fredericia	22	7	3	12	30	49	−19	24	Qualification for the Relegation round
11	Silkeborg	22	5	4	13	24	45	−21	19	Qualification for the Relegation round
12	Vejle	22	3	5	14	26	45	−19	14	Qualification for the Relegation round

Source: Danish Football Association (in Danish), Soccerway
Rules for classification: 1) Points; 2) Goal difference; 3) Goals scored; 4) Away goals scored; 5) Play-off (played on neutral ground if determining teams for different rounds); 6) Draw.

==== 1st Division ====
Pos	Team	Pld	W	D	L	GF	GA	GD	Pts	Promotion or Relegation
1	Lyngby	22	12	6	4	49	25	+24	42	Advances to Promotion Group
2	Hvidovre	22	10	9	3	34	23	+11	39	Advances to Promotion Group
3	Hillerød	22	10	7	5	33	29	+4	37	Advances to Promotion Group
4	Esbjerg fB	22	11	4	7	32	29	+3	37	Advances to Promotion Group
5	Kolding	22	9	6	7	29	23	+6	33	Advances to Promotion Group
6	AC Horsens	22	8	6	8	26	24	+2	30	Advances to Promotion Group
7	AaB	22	7	7	8	33	31	+2	28	Advances to Relegation Group
8	B.93	22	8	4	10	22	36	−14	28	Advances to Relegation Group
9	Aarhus Fremad	22	6	9	7	32	27	+5	27	Advances to Relegation Group
10	Hobro	22	6	7	9	21	30	−9	25	Advances to Relegation Group
11	HB Køge	22	5	5	12	26	41	−15	20	Advances to Relegation Group
12	Middelfart BK	22	2	6	14	21	44	−23	12	Advances to Relegation Group

Updated to match(es) played on completed. Source: Betinia LIGA
Rules for classification: 1) Points; 2) Goal difference; 3) Number of goals scored

==== 3rd Division ====
Pos	Team	Pld	W	D	L	GF	GA	GD	Pts	Promotion or Relegation
1	Nykøbing FC	22	17	4	1	53	17	+36	55	Qualification to Promotion Group
2	FA 2000	22	13	3	6	33	23	+10	42	Qualification to Promotion Group
3	Næsby	22	11	3	8	42	39	+3	36	Qualification to Promotion Group
4	Brønshøj BK	22	9	5	8	34	38	−4	32	Qualification to Promotion Group
5	Vanløse IF	22	9	4	9	30	27	+3	31	Qualification to Promotion Group
6	Hørsholm-Usserød	22	8	5	9	38	38	0	29	Qualification to Promotion Group
7	BK Frem	22	8	4	10	22	24	−2	28	Qualification to Relegation Group
8	Holbæk B&I	22	9	5	8	43	33	+10	26	Qualification to Relegation Group
9	Vejgaard BK	22	7	5	10	30	46	−16	26	Qualification to Relegation Group
10	Sundby BK	22	7	3	12	32	41	−9	24	Qualification to Relegation Group
11	Odder	22	6	3	13	24	31	−7	21	Qualification to Relegation Group
12	IF Lyseng	22	5	2	15	14	38	−24	17	Qualification to Relegation Group

Updated to match(es) played on completed. Source:
Rules for classification: 1) Points; 2) Goal difference; 3) Number of goals scored

=== Women's football ===
==== A-Liga ====
Pos	Team	Pld	W	D	L	GF	GA	GD	Pts	Qualification
1	HB Køge (C)	10	6	3	1	50	22	+28	53	Champions League second qualifying round
2	Brøndby	10	8	2	0	39	16	+23	50	Champions League second qualifying round
3	Fortuna Hjørring	10	4	0	6	37	21	+16	41	Europa Cup first qualifying round
4	Nordsjælland	10	4	4	2	47	26	+21	37	
5	AGF	10	0	2	8	26	34	−8	26	
6	Kolding	10	2	1	7	25	55	−30	18	

Source: Danish Football Association (in Danish)
Rules for classification: 1) Points; 2) Goal difference; 3) Goals scored; 4) Away goals scored; 5) Play-off (played on neutral ground if determining teams for different rounds); 6) Draw.
(C) Champions

== International club competitions ==
=== Champions League ===
==== Qualifying rounds ====
Second qualifying round
Team 1	Agg.	Team 2	1st leg	2nd leg
Copenhagen (Denmark)	3–0	(Kosovo) Drita	2–0	1–0

Third qualifying round
Team 1	Agg.	Team 2	1st leg	2nd leg
Malmö FF (Sweden)	0–5	(Denmark) Copenhagen	0–0	0–5

Play-off round
Team 1	Agg.	Team 2	1st leg	2nd leg
Basel (Switzerland)	1–3	(Denmark) Copenhagen	1–1	0–2

==== League phase ====
Pos	Team	Pld	W	D	L	GF	GA	GD	Pts
29	(Royal Spanish Football Federation) Athletic Bilbao	8	2	2	4	9	14	−5	8
30	(Italian Football Federation) Napoli	8	2	2	4	9	15	−6	8
31	(Danish Football Association) Copenhagen	8	2	2	4	12	21	−9	8
32	(Royal Dutch Football Association) Ajax	8	2	0	6	8	21	−13	6
33	(German Football Association) Eintracht Frankfurt	8	1	1	6	10	21	−11	4

Source: UEFA
Rules for classification: League phase tiebreakers

=== Europa League ===
==== Qualifying rounds ====
Second qualifying round
Team 1	Agg.	Team 2	1st leg	2nd leg
Midtjylland (Denmark)	3–2	(Scotland) Hibernian	1–1	2–1 (a.e.t.)

Third qualifying round
Team 1	Agg.	Team 2	1st leg	2nd leg
Fredrikstad (Norway)	1–5	(Denmark) Midtjylland	1–3	0–2

Play-off round
Team 1	Agg.	Team 2	1st leg	2nd leg
Midtjylland (Denmark)	6–0	(Finland) KuPS	4–0	2–0

==== League phase ====
Pos	Team	Pld	W	D	L	GF	GA	GD	Pts	Qualification
1	(French Football Federation) Lyon	8	7	0	1	18	5	+13	21	Advance to round of 16 (seeded)
2	(The Football Association) Aston Villa	8	7	0	1	14	6	+8	21	Advance to round of 16 (seeded)
3	(Danish Football Association) Midtjylland	8	6	1	1	18	8	+10	19	Advance to round of 16 (seeded)
4	(Royal Spanish Football Federation) Real Betis	8	5	2	1	13	7	+6	17 (Note: Away goals scored: Real Betis 5, Porto 3.)	Advance to round of 16 (seeded)
5	(Portuguese Football Federation) Porto	8	5	2	1	13	7	+6	17	Advance to round of 16 (seeded)

Source: UEFA
Rules for classification: League phase tiebreakers
Notes:

Play-off round
Team 1	Agg.	Team 2	1st leg	2nd leg
Midtjylland (Denmark)	2–2 (0–3 p)	(England) Nottingham Forest	1–0	1–2(a.e.t.)

== National teams ==
=== Men's senior ===
==== Results and fixtures ====
===== 2026 FIFA World Cup qualification =====
====== Group C ======
Pos	Team	Pld	W	D	L	GF	GA	GD	Pts	Qualification	(Scotland national football team)	(Denmark national football team)	(Greece national football team)	(Belarus national football team)
1	Scotland	6	4	1	1	13	7	+6	13	Qualification for 2026 FIFA World Cup	—	4–2	3–1	2–1
2	Denmark	6	3	2	1	16	7	+9	11	Advance to play-offs	0–0	—	3–1	2–2
3	Greece	6	2	1	3	10	12	−2	7		3–2	0–3	—	5–1
4	Belarus	6	0	2	4	4	17	−13	2		0–2	0–6	0–0	—

Source: FIFA, UEFA

5 September 2025 1	Denmark	v	Scotland	Copenhagen, Denmark
20:45 CEST		Report		Stadium: Parken Stadium

8 September 2025 2	Greece	v	Denmark	Piraeus, Greece
21:45 EEST		Report		Stadium: Karaiskakis Stadium

9 October 2025 3	Belarus	v	Denmark	Hungary
20:45 CEST		Report		Attendance: 0

12 October 2025 4	Denmark	v	Greece	Copenhagen, Denmark
20:45 CEST		Report		Stadium: Parken Stadium

15 November 2025 5	Denmark	v	Belarus	Copenhagen, Denmark
20:45 CET		Report		Stadium: Parken Stadium

18 November 2025 6	Scotland	v	Denmark	Glasgow, Scotland
19:45 GMT		Report		Stadium: Hampden Park

=== Women's senior ===
==== Results and fixtures ====
===== 2025 UEFA Women's Nations League =====
====== Promotion/relegation matches ======
24 October 2025	Finland	v	Denmark	Finland

28 October 2025	Denmark	v	Finland	Denmark

=== Women's under-23 ===
==== Results and fixtures ====
===== Friendlies =====
25 October 2025	Denmark	v	Mexico	Helsinki, Finland
		Report

=== Men's under-21 ===
==== Results and fixtures ====
===== 2027 UEFA European Under-21 Championship qualification =====
====== Group I ======
Pos	Team	Pld	W	D	L	GF	GA	GD	Pts	Qualification	Belgium	Denmark	Austria	Wales	Belarus
1	Belgium	8	5	2	1	13	2	+11	17	Final tournament	—	2–0	1–0	1–0	1–0
2	Denmark	8	4	3	1	15	6	+9	15	Play-offs	0–0	—	1–1	4–0	2–0
3	Austria	8	4	2	2	15	9	+6	14		1–0	1–1	—	0–2	2–1
4	Wales	8	2	0	6	7	28	−21	6		0–7	2–6	1–7	—	2–0
5	Belarus	8	1	1	6	7	12	−5	4		1–1	0–1	2–3	3–0	—

Source: UEFA
Rules for classification: Tiebreakers

8 September 2025	Denmark	v	Wales
		Report

10 October 2025	Denmark	v	Austria
		Report

14 October 2025	Belgium	v	Denmark
		Report

18 November 2025	Denmark	v	Belarus
		Report

=== Men's under-19 ===
==== Results and fixtures ====
===== Friendlies =====
4 September 2025	Denmark	v	Romania	Skive, Denmark
12:00 CEST		Report		Stadium: Skive Stadium

7 September 2025	Denmark	v	Norway	Viborg, Denmark, Denmark
16:00 CEST		Report		Stadium: Viborg Stadium

8 October 2025	Denmark	v	Poland	Medulin, Croatia
		Report

11 October 2025	Denmark	v	Portugal	Medulin, Croatia
		Report

14 October 2025	Denmark	v	Republic of Ireland	Medulin, Croatia
		Report

===== 2026 UEFA European Under-19 Championship qualification =====
====== Qualifying round ======
Pos	Team	Pld	W	D	L	GF	GA	GD	Pts	Qualification
1	Denmark	3	2	0	1	13	1	+12	6 (Note: Ranked on head-to-head goal difference: Denmark +6, Sweden 0, Switzerland –6.)	Elite round
2	Sweden	3	2	0	1	3	1	+2	6	Elite round
3	Switzerland (H)	3	2	0	1	4	7	−3	6	Elite round
4	San Marino	3	0	0	3	0	11	−11	0	

Source: UEFA
Rules for classification: Tiebreakers
(H) Hosts
Notes:

12 November 2025	Denmark	v	San Marino	Baden, Switzerland
		Report

15 November 2025	Denmark	v	Sweden	Baden, Switzerland
		Report

18 November 2025	Switzerland	v	Denmark	Baden, Switzerland
		Report

=== Men's under-18 ===
==== Results and fixtures ====
===== Friendlies =====
4 September 2025	Sweden	v	Denmark	Sundsvall, Sweden
17:30 CEST		Report

6 September 2025	Denmark	v	Norway	Sundsvall, Sweden
14:00 CEST		Report

9 September 2025	Ukraine	v	Denmark	Sundsvall, Sweden
17:30 CEST		Report

9 October 2025	Czech Republic	v	Denmark	Prague, Czech Republic
		Report		Stadium: Sportscenter Radotin

12 October 2025	Czech Republic	v	Denmark	Prague, Czech Republic
		Report		Stadium: Sportscenter Radotin
