= Tsepenkov =

Tsepenkov (Belarusian: Цапянкоў, Bulgarian: Цепенков, Russian: Цепенков) or female form Tsepenkova (Bulgarian: Цепенкова, Russian: Цепенкова) is a surname of Slavic-language origin. Notable people with this surname include:

- Marko Tsepenkov (1829 - 1920), Bulgarian folklorist
- Kirill Tsepenkov (born 2004), Belarusian footballer
