= National Football Stadium (Belarus) =

Stadium in Minsk, Belarus

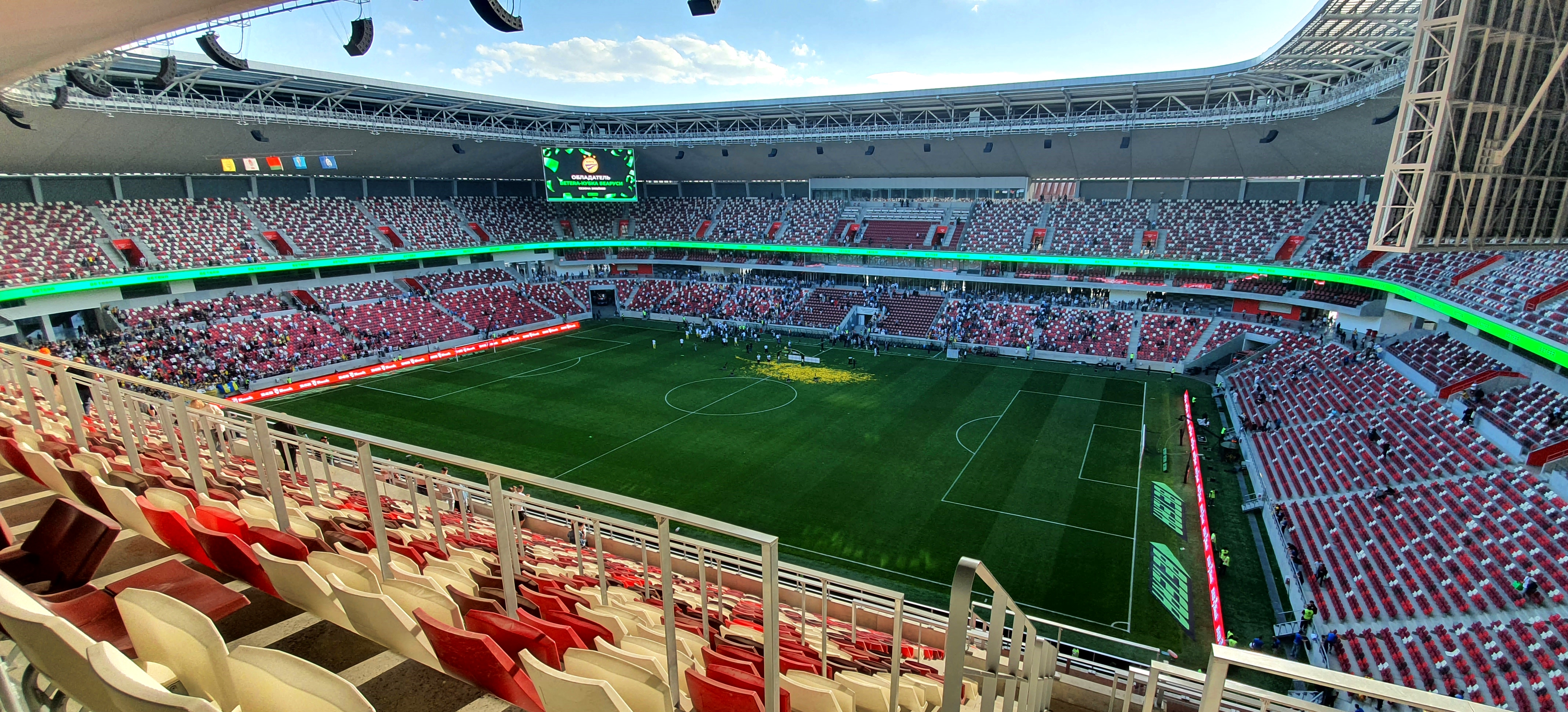
- UEFA
- Interactive map of National Football Stadium
- Location: Minsk, Belarus
- Owner: Government of Belarus
- Operator: Belarusian Football Federation
- Capacity: 33,000
- Surface: Grass

Construction
- Opened: 7 June 2025
- Main contractor: Beijing Urban Construction Group

Tenant
- Belarus national football team

The National Football Stadium (Belarusian: Нацыянальны футбольны стадыён, romanized: Nacyjanalny futbolny stadion) is a football and multi-purpose stadium in Minsk, Belarus. Opened on 7 June 2025, it serves as the new home ground of the Belarus national football team and is the largest stadium in the country, with a seating capacity of over 33,000 spectators.

The stadium was constructed with support from the Government of China and built by the Beijing Urban Construction Group, which previously completed several major public projects in Minsk. It is located on Partizansky Avenue, on the eastern side of the city. The arena meets all UEFA Category 4 standards, allowing it to host international fixtures such as the UEFA Champions League, UEFA Europa League, and FIFA World Cup qualification matches.

The National Football Stadium features modern facilities including an advanced field heating and irrigation system, LED floodlighting, and two large display screens. It is equipped to host international football events as well as domestic tournaments.

At the ceremony opening the National Football Stadium in Minsk on 7 June 2025, Belarusian President Alexander Lukashenko called the project "the greatest event" for Belarusian sport infrastructure and highlighted the role of Xi Jinping and Chinese cooperation in making the stadium possible.

The stadium's inaugural match was a friendly between the Belarus U-21 and China U-22 national teams, which ended in a 1–1 draw. Three days later, the venue hosted its first senior international match, a friendly between Belarus and Russia that ended in a 4–1 victory for Russia.

== See also ==
- Sport in Belarus
- Belarus national football team
- Belarus–China relations
