= Dinamo Stadium (Minsk) =

Multi-purpose stadium in Belarus

Dinamo National Olympic Stadium Dynama National Olympic Stadium
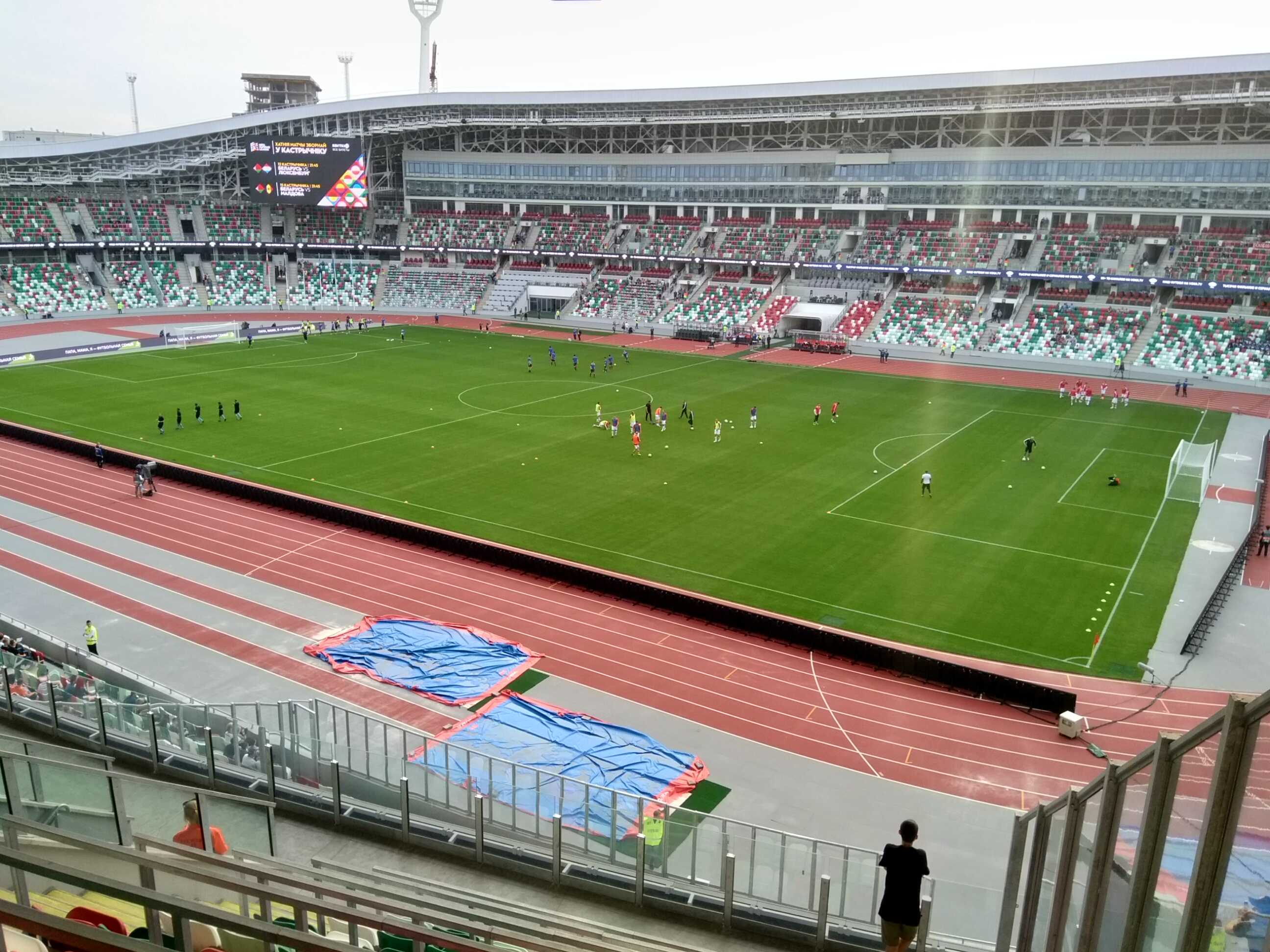
- UEFA
- Interactive map of Dinamo National Olympic Stadium; Dynama National Olympic Stadium
- Location: Minsk, Belarus
- Coordinates: 53°53′42.67″N 27°33′36.20″E
- Capacity: 22,246
- Surface: Grass
- Field size: 105х68

Construction
- Opened: 1934
- Renovated: 1939, 1947–1954, 1978-1980, 2012–2017

Tenants
- FC Dinamo Minsk (1934–2008, 2018–); FC Minsk (2009–2012); Belarus national football team (1992–2012, 2018–2025)

A birds eye view of the Stadium from June 2018.

Dinamo National Olympic Stadium (Belarusian: Нацыянальны Алімпійскі стадыён Дынама, romanized: Natsyyanalny Alimpiiski stadyyon Dynama, Belarusian pronunciation: [stadɨˈjɔn dɨˈnama], Russian: Национальный Олимпийский стадион Динамо, romanized: Natsional'nyy Olimpiyskiy stadion Dinamo, Russian pronunciation: [stədʲɪˈon dʲɪˈnamə]) is a multi-purpose stadium in Minsk, Belarus. It first opened in 1934 and has had several renovations over the years, reopening after the latest one in 2017. Earlier it was used mostly for football matches and was the home ground of Dinamo Minsk, FC Minsk and the Belarus national football team. Previously the stadium officially held 41,040, but because part of the upper stand had been abandoned in the mid-1990s for safety reasons, the actual capacity before renovations was 33,942. After renovation the capacity is only 22,246.

== History ==
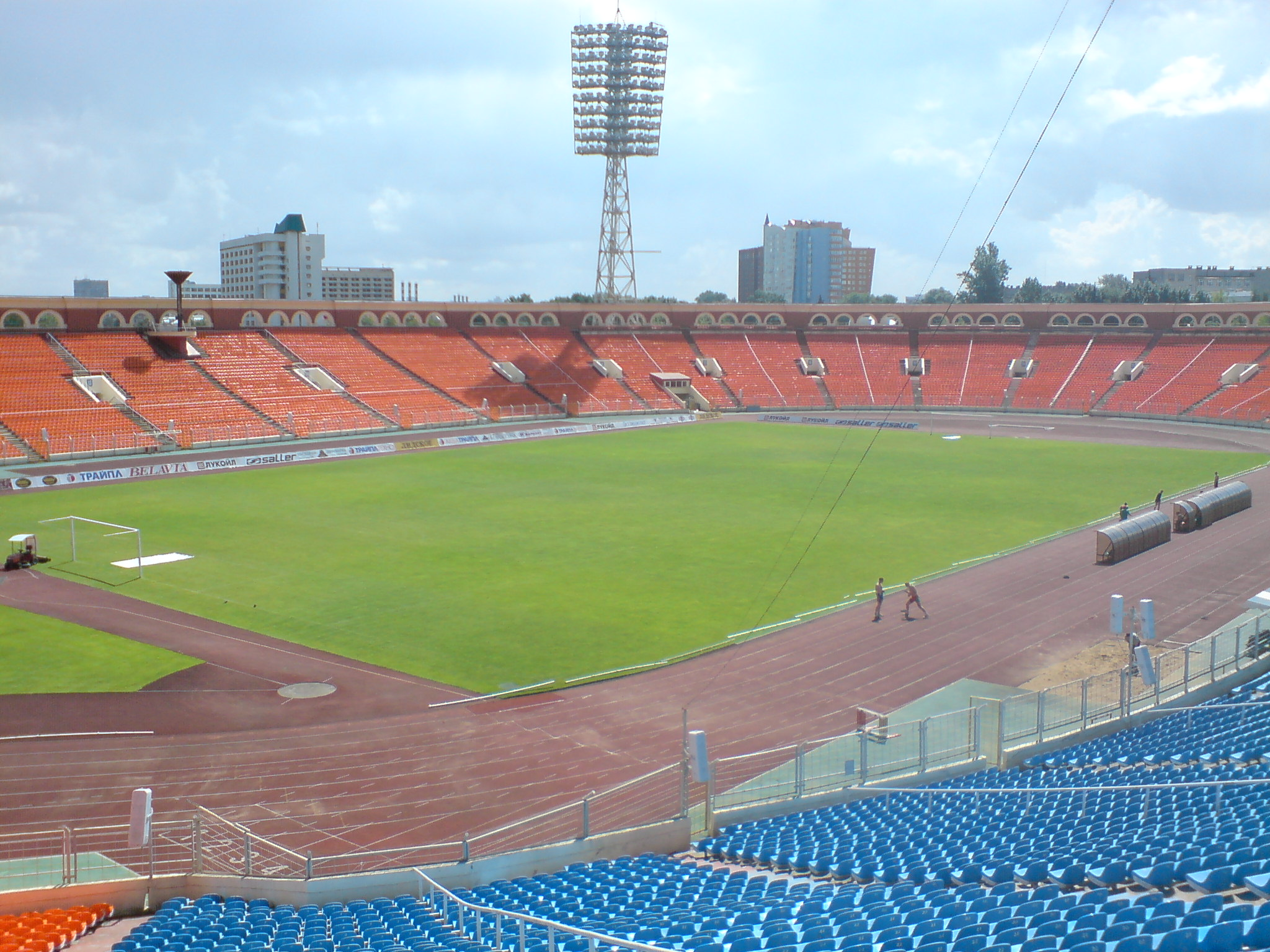
Dinamo Stadium in 2008.

Dinamo Stadium was constructed and opened in 1934 and then expanded in 1939. It was destroyed during the Second World War and rebuilt during the years 1947–1954. It was further renovated during 1978–1980 in preparation for 1980 Summer Olympics. In October 2012, the stadium was closed for major reconstruction works. It was reopened in December 2017 as a soccer-specific stadium, in time for the 2019 European Games.

== Domestic use ==
During the Soviet years the stadium was a home venue for Dinamo Minsk, who continued to use the stadium until 2008. Since 2009, Dinamo Minsk has relocated to a smaller Dinamo-Yuni Stadium, while Dinamo Stadium became the primary home venue for FC Minsk. It hosted the final match of the Belarusian Cup, that was held there every year between 1992 and 2012, with the exception of 2002 and 2011.

== International use ==
The stadium was one of the venues of the football tournament at the 1980 Summer Olympics. It hosted six group phase matches and one quarterfinal. It was one of the venues at the 1984 UEFA European Under-18 Football Championship and at the 1985 FIFA U20 World Cup, both held in the Soviet Union. Between 1992 and 2025, the stadium was the primary home venue for the Belarus national football team. In 2025 the national team moved to the recently completed Belarus national football stadium.
