= Trofim Melnichenko =

Belarusian footballer (born 2006)

Personal information
- Full name: Trofim Denisovich Melnichenko
- Date of birth: 18 September 2006 (age 20)
- Place of birth: Minsk, Belarus
- Height: 1.84 m (6 ft 0 in)
- Position: Forward

Team information
- Current team: Porto B
- Number: 43

Youth career
- –2023: Dinamo Minsk

Senior career*
Years	Team	Apps	(Gls)
2024	Dinamo-2 Minsk	1	(0)
2024	Dinamo Minsk	21	(2)
2025–	Porto B	44	(3)

International career^{‡}
2022	Belarus U16	6	(3)
2022–2023	Belarus U17	11	(1)
2022	Belarus U18	1	(0)
2023–2024	Belarus U19	6	(0)
2024–	Belarus U21	3	(0)
2024–	Belarus	13	(2)
- * Club domestic league appearances and goals as of 19 June 2026 ‡ National team caps and goals as of 6 October 2026 (UTC)

Trofim Denisovich Melnichenko (Belarusian: Трафім Дзянісавіч Мельнічэнка; Russian: Трофим Денисович Мельниченко; born 18 September 2006) is a Belarusian professional footballer who plays as a forward for Liga Portugal 2 club Porto B and the Belarus national team.

== Club career ==
On 15 January 2025, Melnichenko joined Porto B team, signing a three-year contract with the club.

== International career ==
Melnichenko made his debut for the Belarus national team on 5 September 2024 in a Nations League game against Bulgaria at the ZTE Arena in Hungary. He substituted Yevgeny Shikavka in the 83rd minute of a scoreless draw.

His first goal for Belarus came during a 5–0 win against Tajikistan on 20 March 2025.

== Career statistics ==
=== International ===
As of match played 6 October 2026

Appearances and goals by national team and year
National team	Year	Apps	Goals
Belarus	2024	1	0
Belarus	2025	9	2
Belarus	2026	3	0
Total		13	2

Scores and results list Belarus' goal tally first.

No	Date	Venue	Opponent	Score	Result	Competition
1.	20 March 2025	Pamir Stadium, Dushanbe, Tajikistan	Tajikistan	2–0	5–0	Friendly
2.	5 June 2025	Borisov Arena, Barysaw, Belarus	Kazakhstan	2–0	4–1	Friendly
