= Ilya Rashchenya =

Belarusian professional footballer

Personal information
- Full name: Ilya Vasilyevich Rashchenya
- Date of birth: 27 May 1997 (age 29)
- Place of birth: Minsk, Belarus
- Height: 1.84 m (6 ft 0 in)
- Position: Defender

Team information
- Current team: Slavia Mozyr
- Number: 4

Youth career
- 2012–2014: Energetik-BGU Minsk

Senior career*
Years	Team	Apps	(Gls)
2014–2019	Energetik-BGU Minsk	101	(1)
2019	→ Inkomsport Yalta (loan)	9	(0)
2019	→ Smolevichi (loan)	11	(1)
2020	Smolevichi	11	(0)
2020–2021	Slutsk	20	(0)
2021–2023	Volgar Astrakhan	50	(0)
2023–2024	Gomel	42	(0)
2025–2026	BATE Borisov	28	(0)
2026–	Slavia Mozyr	5	(0)

International career
2012–2013	Belarus U17		
2015	Belarus U19	3	(0)
2016	Belarus U21	1	(0)
- * Club domestic league appearances and goals as of 4 September 2026

Ilya Vasilyevich Rashchenya (Belarusian: Ілля Васільевіч Рашчэня; Russian: Илья Васильевич Ращеня; born 27 May 1997) is a Belarusian professional footballer who plays for Slavia Mozyr.
