= Ruslan Myalkovsky =

Belarusian footballer (born 2006)

Personal information
- Full name: Ruslan Olegovich Myalkovsky
- Date of birth: 7 May 2006 (age 20)
- Place of birth: Minsk, Belarus
- Height: 1.85 m (6 ft 1 in)
- Position: Forward

Team information
- Current team: Lokomotiv Moscow
- Number: 99

Youth career
- –2019: Minsk
- 2019–2020: Dynamo Brest
- 2020–2021: Rukh Brest
- 2021–2022: ABFF Academy

Senior career*
Years	Team	Apps	(Gls)
2022–2025	Arsenal Dzerzhinsk	50	(5)
2025–	Lokomotiv Moscow	9	(0)
2025	→ Arsenal Dzerzhinsk (loan)	15	(4)

International career^{‡}
2021–2022	Belarus U16	7	(0)
2021–2023	Belarus U17	16	(3)
2023–2024	Belarus U19	5	(1)
2024–	Belarus U21	18	(4)
2026–	Belarus	1	(0)
- * Club domestic league appearances and goals as of 22 August 2026 ‡ National team caps and goals as of 14 November 2026

Ruslan Olegovich Myalkovsky (Belarusian: Руслан Алегавіч Мялкоўскі; Russian: Руслан Олегович Мялковский; born 7 May 2006) is a Belarusian football player who plays for Russian club Lokomotiv Moscow and the Belarus national team. He has been deployed in many attacking positions, as an attacking midfielder, a winger on either flank or as a centre-forward.

== Club career ==
On 10 January 2025, Myalkovsky signed a three-and-a-half-year contract with Russian Premier League club Lokomotiv Moscow and was loaned back to his previous club Arsenal Dzerzhinsk until the end of the 2024–25 Russian season.

He made his RPL debut for Lokomotiv Moscow on 16 August 2025 in a game against Baltika Kaliningrad.

== International career ==
Myalkovsky made his debut for the Belarus national team on 9 June 2026 in a friendly against Burkina Faso.

== Career statistics ==
As of 29 October 2026

Club	Season	League			Cup		Other		Total	
Club	Season	Division	Apps	Goals	Apps	Goals	Apps	Goals	Apps	Goals
Arsenal Dzerzhinsk	2022	Belarusian Premier League	10	1	0	0	2 (Note: Appearances in relegation play-offs)	0	12	1
Arsenal Dzerzhinsk	2023	Belarusian First League	16	0	1	0	–		17	0
Arsenal Dzerzhinsk	2024	Belarusian Premier League	24	4	2	0	–		26	4
Arsenal Dzerzhinsk	Total		50	5	3	0	2	0	55	5
Arsenal Dzerzhinsk (loan)	2025	Belarusian Premier League	15	4	0	0	–		15	4
Arsenal Dzerzhinsk (loan)	Club total		65	9	3	0	2	0	70	9
Lokomotiv Moscow	2025–26	Russian Premier League	7	0	8	0	–		15	0
Lokomotiv Moscow	2026–27	Russian Premier League	2	0	2	0	–		4	0
Lokomotiv Moscow	Total		9	0	10	0	0	0	19	0
Career total			74	9	13	0	2	0	89	9
