= Timofey Simanenka =

Belarusian footballer

Personal information
- Date of birth: 27 November 2006 (age 19)
- Place of birth: Minsk, Belarus
- Height: 1.86 m (6 ft 1 in)
- Position: Forward

Team information
- Current team: Gomel
- Number: 11

Youth career
- –2023: Minsk

Senior career*
Years	Team	Apps	(Gls)
2023–2025	Minsk	47	(4)
2025	Minsk II	4	(1)
2025–	Gomel	37	(15)

International career^{‡}
2023	Belarus U17	7	(2)
2024–2025	Belarus U19	8	(4)
2025–	Belarus U21	13	(2)
2026–	Belarus	2	(0)
- * Club domestic league appearances and goals as of 27 September 2026 ‡ National team caps and goals as of 3 October 2026

Timofey Simanenka (Belarusian: Цімафей Андрэевіч Сіманенка born 27 November 2006) is a Belarusian professional footballer who plays as a forward for Belarusian Premier League team Gomel and the Belarus national football team.

== Club career ==
Born in Minsk, Simanenka began is career at FC Minsk, where he made his debut for the reserve team in a 3-1 win over Slutsk II on 2023. Simanenka scored 5 goals in 20 matches for the reserves in 2023, also making 5 Belarusian Premier League appearances for the first team that year, including his debut as a 16 year old against Dynamo Brest in June 2023.

Simanenka joined fellow top tier side FC Gomel in 2025 on a 2-year contract. He scored 4 goals in his first half season, including a header against his former side FC Minsk in August of that year. The following season, Simanenka would score 5 goals in 3 matches, with doubles against Naftan and Slavia Mozyr, as well as a single goal against Bobruisk.

== International career ==
Simanenka has represented Belarus at U17, U19 and U21 level, totaling 8 goals in 28 games. He scored a late equaliser against Belgium in September 2025.

Simanenka made his senior national team debut in September 2026, coming on as a substitute in a 2–0 UEFA Nations League defeat to Albania.

== Personal life ==
Simanenka is majoring in Business and Administration at Belarus State Economic University.

== Career statistics ==
As of match played 20 September 2026

Appearances and goals by club, season and competition
Club	Season	League			National cup		Continental		Total	
Club	Season	Division	Apps	Goals	Apps	Goals	Apps	Goals	Apps	Goals
Minsk	2023	Belarusian Premier League	5	0	3	0	0	0	8	0
Minsk	2024	Belarusian Premier League	26	3	1	0	0	0	27	1
Minsk	2025	Belarusian Premier League	16	1	2	1	0	0	18	2
Minsk	Total		47	4	6	1	0	0	53	5
Minsk II	2025	Belarusian First League	4	1	0	0	0	0	4	1
Minsk II	Total		4	1	0	0	0	0	4	1
Gomel	2025	Belarusian Premier League	14	4	0	0	0	0	14	4
Gomel	2026	Belarusian Premier League	23	11	2	0	0	0	25	11
Gomel	Total		37	15	2	0	0	0	39	15
Career total			88	20	8	1	0	0	96	21
