= Belarus national football team =

Men's national association football team representing Belarus

Belarus
- Nickname(s): Белыя крылы / Bielyia kryly (The White Wings)
- Association: Football Federation of Belarus (BFF)
- Confederation: UEFA (Europe)
- Head coach: Viktor Goncharenko
- Captain: Yevgeny Yablonsky
- Most caps: Alyaksandr Kulchy (102)
- Top scorer: Maksim Romaschenko (20)
- Home stadium: National Football Stadium; Dinamo Stadium, Minsk
- FIFA code: BLR
First colours	Second colours

FIFA ranking
- Current: 94 (18 November 2026)
- Highest: 36 (February 2011)
- Lowest: 142 (March 1994)

First international
- Unofficial; Lithuania 1–1 Belarus (Vilnius, Lithuania; 20 July 1992); Official; Belarus 1–1 Ukraine (Minsk, Belarus; 28 October 1992)

Biggest win
- Belarus 5–0 Lithuania (Minsk, Belarus; 7 June 1998); Belarus 6–1 Tajikistan (Borisov, Belarus; 4 September 2014); Belarus 5–0 San Marino (Minsk, Belarus; 8 September 2018); Tajikistan 0–5 Belarus (Dushanbe, Tajikistan; 20 March 2025)

Biggest defeat
- Belgium 8–0 Belarus (Leuven, Belgium; 30 March 2021)

The Belarus national football team (Belarusian: Зборная Беларусі па футболе, romanized: Zbornaja Biełarusi pa futbole; Russian: Сборная Беларуси по футболу, romanized: Sbornaya Belarusi po futbolu) represents Belarus in men's international football, and is controlled by the Football Federation of Belarus, the governing body for football in Belarus. Belarus' home ground is Dinamo Stadium in Minsk. Since independence in 1991, Belarus has not yet qualified for a FIFA World Cup or UEFA European Championship.

== History ==
After the split of the Soviet Union, Belarus played their first match against Lithuania on 20 July 1992.

Belarus won their group in the 2018–19 UEFA Nations League D that contained Luxembourg, Moldova, and San Marino, and qualified for the country's first-ever playoffs after they finished fourth in their group during UEFA Euro 2020 qualifying. The team was scheduled to play against Georgia. However, they lost 1–0, missing a place at UEFA Euro 2020.

== Team image ==
=== Nickname ===
In August 2016, the Football Federation announced that the team's nickname would be the "White Wings". The name was influenced by the book The Land Beneath White Wings (1977) by Belarusian writer Uladzimir Karatkievich. The federation's marketing and communications director said: "We are looking at various ways of establishing links with our literary heritage and cultural traditions", stating that "If the Belarusian people opt to associate the team with Karatkevich, almost every phrase in the book can be used as a hashtag!"

=== Home venue ===
From September to October 2021, Central Stadium in Kazan, Russia has been their home venue because of travel sanctions imposed after an incident with Ryanair Flight 4978.

However from March 2022 onwards, due to Belarusian involvement in the Russian invasion of Ukraine, UEFA – the European governing body for association football – banned Belarusian clubs and national teams from hosting competitive international matches, whilst allowing them to continue playing competitive matches, albeit at a neutral stadium and behind closed doors when they play as host. Since then, all of their competitive matches have been held in Hungary or Serbia.

Since June 2025, Belarus play their non-competitive matches in the newly opened National Football Stadium in Minsk.

=== Kit ===
Kit provider	Period
(United Kingdom) Umbro	2002–2004
(Germany) Puma	2004–2012
(Germany) Adidas	2012–2018
(Italy) Macron	2018–2022
(Italy) Erreà	2022–2026
(Germany) Adidas	2026-present

== Results and fixtures ==
The following is a list of match results in the last 12 months, as well as any future matches that have been scheduled.

Win Draw Loss Fixture

=== 2026 ===
26 March Friendly	Cyprus	0–1	Belarus	Nicosia, Cyprus
19:00 (UTC+2)		Report	Tikhomirov 25'	Stadium: GSP Stadium; Attendance: 500; Referee: Miloš Milanović (Serbia)

29 March Friendly	Armenia	1–2	Belarus	Yerevan, Armenia
18:00 UTC+4	Bichakhchyan 88' (pen.)	Report	Yablonsky 8'; Tiknizyan 72' (o.g.)	Stadium: Vazgen Sargsyan Republican Stadium; Attendance: 11,483; Referee: Dumitru Muntean (Moldova)

5 June Friendly	Belarus	4–1	Syria	Minsk, Belarus
19:00 UTC+3	Morozov 3'; Kontsevoy 11'; Shumansky 48'; Yablonsly 78'	Report	Al-Mawas 88' (pen.)	Stadium: National Football Stadium; Attendance: 13,811; Referee: Aliyar Aghayev (Azerbaijan)

9 June Friendly	Belarus	2–2	Burkina Faso	Minsk, Belarus
19:30 UTC+3	Malkevich 56'; Vardanyan 67'	Report	Kaboré 72'; Tapsoba 85'	Stadium: National Football Stadium; Attendance: 15,874; Referee: Rafael Shafeev (Russia)

26 September 2026–27 UEFA Nations League	Albania	2–0	Belarus	Tirana, Albania
20:45	Asllani 34' (pen.); Muçi 45+2'	Report		Stadium: Arena Kombëtare; Attendance: 18,150; Referee: Sam Barrott (England)

29 September 2026–27 UEFA Nations League	Finland	0–0	Belarus	Helsinki, Finland
20:45		Report		Stadium: Helsinki Olympic Stadium; Attendance: 7,262; Referee: Nikola Dabanović (Montenegro)

3 October 2026–27 UEFA Nations League	Belarus	4–0	San Marino	Budapest, Hungary (Note: Due to the Belarusian involvement in the Russian invasion of Ukraine, Belarus are required to play their home matches at neutral venues and behind closed doors.)
18:00	Kontsevoy 46', 88'; Shumansky 65'; Ebong 68'	Report		Stadium: Illovszky Rudolf Stadion; Attendance: 0 Referee: Alexandros Tsakalidis (Greece)

6 October 2026–27 UEFA Nations League	Belarus	1–0	Finland	Budapest, Hungary
20:45	Shumansky 1'	Report		Stadium: Illovszky Rudolf Stadion; Attendance: 0 Referee: Sascha Stegemann (Germany)

12 November 2026–27 UEFA Nations League	San Marino	0–2	Belarus	Serravalle, San Marino
20:45		Report	Gomanov 13'; Kontsevoy 17'	Stadium: San Marino Stadium; Attendance: 365; Referee: Goga Kikacheishvili (Georgia)

15 November 2026–27 UEFA Nations League	Belarus	0–2	Albania	Budapest, Hungary
18:00		Report	Manaj 28'; Hysaj 57'	Stadium: Illovszky Rudolf Stadion; Attendance: 0 Referee: Igor Pajač (Croatia)

== Coaching history ==
As of 14 november 2026

Manager	Career	Games Managed	Wins	Draws	Loses	Goals
(Belarus) Mikhail Vergeyenko	1992–1994, 1997–1999	24	2	6	16	22–40
(Belarus) Sergei Borovsky	1994–1996, 1999–2000	26	4	9	13	21–43
(Belarus) Eduard Malofeyev	2000–2003	22	10	5	7	31–31
(Belarus) Valery Streltsov (caretaker)	2002	1	0	0	1	0–3
(Russia) Anatoly Baidachny	2003–2005	22	10	4	8	34–29
(Belarus) Yury Puntus	2006–2007	14	3	4	7	19–26
(Germany) Bernd Stange	2007–2011	49	17	14	18	65–54
(Belarus) Georgy Kondratyev	2011–2014, 2021–2023	49	14	11	24	54–67
(Belarus) Andrei Zygmantovich (caretaker)	2014	2	1	0	1	3–5
(Belarus) Alyaksandr Khatskevich	2014–2016	18	6	6	6	14–19
(Belarus) Igor Kriushenko	2017–2019	25	8	4	13	23–37
(Belarus) Mikhail Markhel	2019–2021	18	7	3	9	23–35
(Belarus) Oleg Radushko (caretaker)	2021	1	0	0	1	0–2
(Spain) Carlos Alós	2023–2025	26	6	10	10	24–40
(Belarus) Viktor Goncharenko	2026–	9	6	2	1	16–6
Total:	1992–Present	306	94	78	135	354–440

== Players ==
=== Current squad ===
The following players were named in the squad for the 2026–27 UEFA Nations League C matches againstSan Marino and Albania on November 12 and November 15.

Caps and goals are correct as of 22 November 2026, after the game against Albania.

No.	Pos.	Player	Date of birth (age)	Caps	Goals	Club
1	GK	Pavel Pavlyuchenko	1 January 1998 (age 28)	20	0	(Football Federation of Belarus) Maxline Vitebsk
12	GK	Andrey Kudravets	2 September 2003 (age 23)	2	0	(Football Federation of Belarus) Dinamo Minsk
21	GK	Fyodor Lapoukhov	20 June 2003 (age 23)	21	0	(Bulgarian Football Union) CSKA Sofia
2	DF	Kiryl Pyachenin	18 March 1997 (age 29)	53	0	(Russian Football Union) Krylia Sovetov
3	DF	Ivan Tikhomirov	14 December 2003 (age 22)	3	1	(Football Federation of Belarus) Isloch Minsk Raion
4	DF	Anton Lukashov	16 September 2004 (age 22)	4	0	(Russian Football Union) FC Orenburg
6	DF	Roman Begunov	22 March 1993 (age 33)	15	0	(Football Federation of Belarus) Dinamo Minsk
13	DF	Kirill Gomanov	17 February 2005 (age 21)	8	1	(Football Federation of Belarus) Maxline Vitebsk
19	DF	Gleb Shevchenko	17 February 1999 (age 27)	20	0	(Russian Football Union) Torpedo Moscow
20	DF	Zakhar Volkov	12 August 1997 (age 29)	32	0	(Football Federation of Belarus) Maxline Vitebsk
7	MF	Artyom Shumansky	25 November 2004 (age 21)	11	3	(Russian Football Union) Akron Tolyatti
8	MF	Aleksandr Selyava	17 May 1993 (age 33)	21	0	(Football Federation of Belarus) Dinamo Minsk
9	MF	Max Ebong	26 August 1999 (age 27)	64	6	(Bulgarian Football Union) CSKA Sofia
10	MF	Valery Gromyko	23 January 1997 (age 29)	39	4	(Football Federation of Belarus) Maxline Vitebsk
14	MF	Kirill Zinovich	3 May 2003 (age 23)	2	0	(Russian Football Union) Dynamo Makhachkala
15	MF	Valery Bocherov	10 August 2000 (age 26)	25	1	(Football Federation of Belarus) Maxline Vitebsk
16	MF	Anton Kovalev	19 April 2000 (age 26)	5	0	(Russian Football Union) Fakel Voronezh
22	MF	Artem Kontsevoy	26 August 1999 (age 27)	22	6	(Football Federation of Belarus) Maxline Vitebsk
	DF	Aleksandr Svirepa	24 August 1999 (age 27)	2	0	(Football Federation of Belarus) Isloch Minsk Raion
5	FW	Timofey Simanenka	27 November 2006 (age 19)	3	0	(Football Federation of Belarus) Gomel
11	FW	German Barkovsky	25 June 2002 (age 24)	20	1	(Polish Football Association) Polonia Warsaw
17	FW	Karen Vardanyan	9 September 2003 (age 23)	4	1	(Football Federation of Belarus) Dinamo Minsk
18	FW	Vladislav Morozov	12 October 2000 (age 26)	17	3	(Danish Football Association) Kolding
23	FW	Trofim Melnichenko	18 September 2006 (age 20)	15	2	(Portuguese Football Federation) Porto B
	FW	Vitaly Lisakovich	8 February 1998 (age 28)	32	7	(Kazakhstan Football Federation) Tobol

=== Recent call-ups ===
The following players have also been called up to the Belarus squad during last 12 months.

Pos.	Player	Date of birth (age)	Caps	Goals	Club	Latest call-up
GK	Mikhail Kozakevich	19 May 2002 (age 24)	0	0	(Belarus) Dynamo Minsk	v.Burkina Faso, 9 June 2026
DF	Vladislav Kalinin	14 January 2002 (age 24)	12	0	(Belarus) Dinamo Minsk	v.Albania, 15 November 2026 ^{INJ}
DF	Vladislav Malkevich	4 December 1999 (age 26)	20	2	(Russia) Ural Yekaterinburg	v.Finland, 6 October 2026
DF	Yegor Parkhomenko	7 January 2003 (age 23)	10	0	(Russia) Torpedo Moscow	v.Burkina Faso, 9 June 2026
DF	Pavel Zabelin	30 June 1995 (age 31)	18	1	(Israel) Maccabi Kiryat Gat	v.Armenia, 29 March 2026
MF	Yevgeny Yablonsky	10 May 1995 (age 31)	57	6	(Greece) Asteras Tripoli	v.Finland, 6 October 2026
MF	Yevgeny Malashevich	10 December 2002 (age 23)	6	0	(Belarus) Dinamo Minsk	v.Finland, 6 October 2026
MF	Daniil Galyata	2 February 2007 (age 19)	1	0	(Cyprus) Aris Limassol	v.Finland, 6 October 2026
MF	Yury Kavalyow	27 January 1993 (age 33)	32	2	(Belarus) BATE Borisov	v.Burkina Faso, 9 June 2026
MF	Ruslan Lisakovich	22 March 2002 (age 24)	12	0	(Belarus) Neman Grodno	v.Burkina Faso, 9 June 2026
MF	Maksim Kireev	9 July 2004 (age 22)	7	0	(Belgium) Mechelen	v.Burkina Faso, 9 June 2026
MF	Mikhail Kozlov	12 February 1990 (age 36)	2	0	(Belarus) Neman Grodno	v.Burkina Faso, 9 June 2026
MF	Artem Sokolovsky	31 July 2006 (age 20)	2	0	(Belarus) Dinamo Minsk	v.Burkina Faso, 9 June 2026
FW	Ruslan Myalkovsky	7 May 2006 (age 20)	1	0	(Russia) Lokomotiv Moscow	v.Burkina Faso, 9 June 2026
^{INJ} Withdrew due to injury^{PRE} Preliminary squad / standby

== Records ==
As of 10 June 2025
Players in bold are still active with Belarus.

=== Most appearances ===
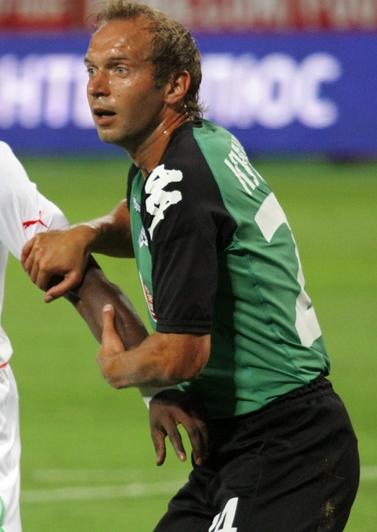
Alyaksandr Kulchy is the most capped player in the history of Belarus

Rank	Player	Caps	Goals	Years
1	Alyaksandr Kulchy	102	5	1996–2012
2	**Alyaksandr Martynovich**	82	2	2009–present
3	Sergei Gurenko	80	3	1994–2006
3	Alexander Hleb	80	6	2001–2019
5	Sergei Kornilenko	78	17	2003–2016
6	Timofey Kalachyov	76	10	2004–2016
7	Syarhey Amelyanchuk	74	1	2002–2011
7	Syarhey Kislyak	74	9	2009–2021
9	Syarhey Shtanyuk	71	3	1995–2007
10	Stanislaw Drahun	68	11	2011–2020

NB Sergei Aleinikov reached a combined 81 caps and 6 goals for Soviet Union, CIS and Belarus between 1984 and 1994.

=== Top goalscorers ===
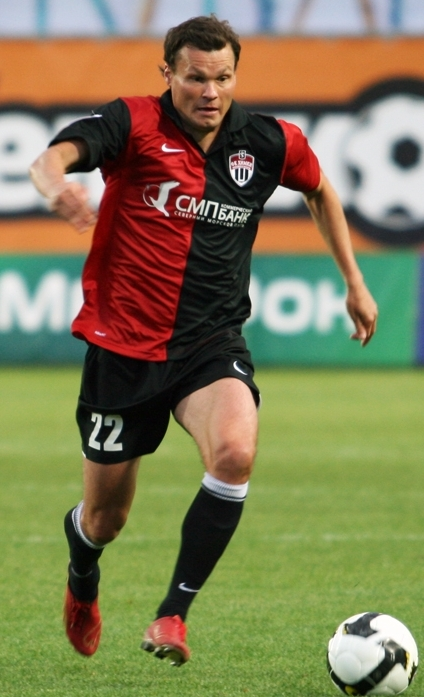
Maksim Romaschenko is the top scorer in the history of Belarus with 20 goals

Rank	Player	Goals	Caps	Ratio	Years
1	Maksim Romaschenko	20	64	0.31	1998–2008
2	Sergei Kornilenko	17	78	0.22	2003–2016
3	Vitali Kutuzov	13	52	0.25	2002–2011
4	Vyacheslav Hleb	12	45	0.27	2004–2011
5	Stanislaw Drahun	11	68	0.16	2011–2020
6	Raman Vasilyuk	10	24	0.42	2000–2008
6	Vitali Rodionov	10	48	0.21	2007–2017
6	Valyantsin Byalkevich	10	56	0.18	1992–2005
6	Timofey Kalachyov	10	76	0.13	2004–2016
10	Syarhey Kislyak	9	74	0.12	2009–2021

== Competitive record ==
=== FIFA World Cup ===
FIFA World Cup record									Qualification record						
Year	Result	Position	Pld	W	D	L	GF	GA	Pos	Pld	W	D	L	GF	GA
(Uruguay) 1930 to (Italy) 1990	Part of the Soviet Union (Note: Across the Soviet Union's seven FIFA World Cup appearances, a total of four Belarusian players were included in the squads: Russian born Eduard Malofeyev (1966), Sergei Borovsky (1982), Sergei Aleinikov (1986 and 1990), and Andrei Zygmantovich (1990).)								Part of the Soviet Union						
(United States) 1994	FIFA member from 1992. Not admitted to the tournament. (Note: FIFA adopted a decision not to allow to participate in the 1994 FIFA World Cup the national teams of those former Soviet republics that did not participate in the qualification draw on 8 December 1991. A proposition of Ukraine to arrange a separate tournament for all successors of the Soviet Union and supported by Georgia and Armenia, was blocked by Russia.)								Not admitted to the tournament						
(France) 1998	Did not qualify								6th	10	1	1	8	5	21
(South Korea) (Japan) 2002	Did not qualify								3rd	10	4	3	3	12	11
(Germany) 2006	Did not qualify								5th	10	2	4	4	12	14
(South Africa) 2010	Did not qualify								4th	10	4	1	5	19	14
(Brazil) 2014	Did not qualify								5th	8	1	1	6	7	16
(Russia) 2018	Did not qualify								6th	10	1	2	7	6	21
(Qatar) 2022	Did not qualify								5th	8	1	0	7	7	24
(Canada) (Mexico) (United States) 2026	Did not qualify								4th	6	0	2	4	4	17
(Morocco) (Portugal) (Spain) 2030	To be determined								To be determined						
(Saudi Arabia) 2034	To be determined								To be determined						
Total	–	0/10	–	–	–	–	–	–	–	72	14	14	44	72	138

=== 2026 FIFA World Cup qualification ===
Pos	Team	Pld	W	D	L	GF	GA	GD	Pts	Qualification	(Scotland national football team)	(Denmark national football team)	(Greece national football team)	(Belarus national football team)
1	Scotland	6	4	1	1	13	7	+6	13	Qualification for 2026 FIFA World Cup	—	4–2	3–1	2–1
2	Denmark	6	3	2	1	16	7	+9	11	Advance to play-offs	0–0	—	3–1	2–2
3	Greece	6	2	1	3	10	12	−2	7		3–2	0–3	—	5–1
4	Belarus	6	0	2	4	4	17	−13	2		0–2	0–6	0–0	—

Source: FIFA, UEFA
Rules for classification: Tiebreakers

=== UEFA European Championship ===
UEFA European Championship record									Qualification record						
Year	Result	Position	Pld	W	D	L	GF	GA	Pos	Pld	W	D	L	GF	GA
(France) 1960 to (Sweden) 1992	Part of the Soviet Union								Part of the Soviet Union						
(England) 1996	Did not qualify								4th	10	3	2	5	8	13
(Belgium) (Netherlands) 2000	Did not qualify								5th	8	0	3	5	4	10
(Portugal) 2004	Did not qualify								5th	8	1	0	7	4	20
(Austria) (Switzerland) 2008	Did not qualify								4th	12	4	1	7	17	23
(Poland) (Ukraine) 2012	Did not qualify								4th	10	3	4	3	8	7
(France) 2016	Did not qualify								4th	10	3	2	5	8	14
(European Union) 2020	Did not qualify								4th	9	1	1	7	4	17
(Germany) 2024	Did not qualify								4th	10	3	3	4	9	14
(England) (Scotland) (Republic of Ireland) (Wales) 2028	To be determined								To be determined						
(Italy) (Turkey) 2032	To be determined								To be determined						
Total	–	0/10	–	–	–	–	–	–	–	77	18	16	43	62	118

=== UEFA Euro 2024 qualification ===
Pos	Team	Pld	W	D	L	GF	GA	GD	Pts	Qualification	(Romania)	(Switzerland)	(Israel)	(Belarus)	(Kosovo)	(Andorra)
1	Romania	10	6	4	0	16	5	+11	22	Qualify for final tournament	—	1–0	1–1	2–1	2–0	4–0
2	Switzerland	10	4	5	1	22	11	+11	17	Qualify for final tournament	2–2	—	3–0	3–3	1–1	3–0
3	Israel	10	4	3	3	11	11	0	15	Advance to play-offs via Nations League	1–2	1–1	—	1–0	1–1	2–1
4	Belarus	10	3	3	4	9	14	−5	12		0–0	0–5	1–2	—	2–1	1–0
5	Kosovo	10	2	5	3	10	10	0	11		0–0	2–2	1–0	0–1	—	1–1
6	Andorra	10	0	2	8	3	20	−17	2		0–2	1–2	0–2	0–0	0–3	—

Source: UEFA
Rules for classification: Qualification tiebreakers

=== UEFA Nations League ===
UEFA Nations League record
Season	Division	Group	Pos.	Pld	W	D	L	GF	GA	P/R	RK
2018–19	D	2	1st	6	4	2	0	10	0	▲	43rd
2020–21	C	4	2nd	6	3	1	2	10	8	Same position	38th
2022–23	C	3	4th	6	0	3	3	3	7	Same position	46th
2024–25	C	3	3rd	6	1	4	1	3	4	Same position	41st
2026–27	C	1	2nd	6	3	1	2	7	4	TBD	38th
2026–27	C	Promotion play-off	TBD	0	0	0	0	0	0	TBD	38th
Total				28	10	11	7	31	21	38th	

=== 2026–27 UEFA Nations League ===
Pos	Team	Pld	W	D	L	GF	GA	GD	Pts	Promotion or qualification	(Albania)	(Belarus)	(Finland)	(San Marino)
1	Albania (P)	6	5	0	1	12	3	+9	15	Promotion to League B	—	2–0	2–0	2–1
2	Belarus	6	3	1	2	7	4	+3	10 (Note: Head-to-head points: Belarus 4, Finland 1.)	Qualification for promotion play-offs	0–2	—	1–0	4–0
3	Finland	6	3	1	2	16	6	+10	10		2–1	0–0	—	7–2
4	San Marino	6	0	0	6	3	25	−22	0		0–3	0–2	0–7	—

Source: UEFA
Rules for classification: Tiebreakers
(P) Promoted

== Head-to-head record ==
As of 6 October 2026

Key
Positive balance (more wins)
Neutral balance (equal W/L ratio)
Negative balance (more losses)

Tournament	Pld	W	D	L	Goals for	Goals against
World Cup Qualifying	70	14	13	43	72	136
Euro Qualifying	77	18	16	43	62	118
UEFA Nations League	28	10	11	7	31	21
Friendly	128	50	36	42	178	160
Opponent	Pld	W	D	L	Goals for	Goals against
Luxembourg	14	8	5	2	15	6
Lithuania	10	5	4	1	19	7
Bulgaria	10	3	2	5	8	13
Netherlands	10	2	0	8	6	23
Estonia	9	4	1	4	10	10
Ukraine	9	1	3	5	5	12
Kazakhstan	8	5	2	1	20	7
Armenia	8	4	2	2	11	10
Moldova	8	2	4	2	9	7
Israel	8	2	0	6	9	16
Romania	8	0	3	5	8	17
Albania	8	2	2	4	10	12
Norway	7	2	2	3	5	9
Wales	7	1	0	6	8	16
Finland	7	1	4	2	5	7
Andorra	6	4	1	1	12	4
Latvia	6	4	1	1	13	7
Poland	6	2	2	2	10	9
Azerbaijan	6	2	2	2	6	6
France	6	1	2	3	6	10
Scotland	6	1	1	4	3	9
Russia	6	0	2	4	5	16
Czech Republic	6	0	0	6	3	14
Slovenia	5	2	2	1	8	5
Slovakia	5	1	1	3	3	9
Montenegro	5	0	2	3	1	6
Northern Ireland	5	0	1	4	1	8
Switzerland	5	0	1	4	3	12
Sweden	5	0	0	5	2	16
Malta	4	2	2	0	4	1
Georgia	4	1	1	2	4	4
Turkey	4	1	1	2	7	8
Greece	4	1	1	2	2	6
Italy	4	0	2	2	5	9
Denmark	4	0	2	2	2	9
Spain	4	0	0	4	1	10
Austria	4	0	0	4	0	12
Uzbekistan	3	2	1	0	5	3
Cyprus	3	2	0	1	4	2
Hungary	3	1	2	0	7	4
Iran	3	1	2	0	4	3
North Macedonia	3	1	1	1	2	4
Germany	3	0	1	2	2	8
Tajikistan	2	2	0	0	11	1
San Marino	3	3	0	0	11	0
Syria	2	2	0	0	5	1
Kosovo	2	2	0	0	3	1
Oman	2	1	0	1	4	2
Canada	2	1	0	1	2	1
United Arab Emirates	2	1	0	1	3	3
Jordan	2	1	0	1	1	1
Honduras	2	0	2	0	3	3
Libya	2	0	2	0	2	2
Croatia	2	0	0	2	1	4
Bosnia and Herzegovina	2	0	0	2	0	3
England	2	0	0	2	1	6
Belgium	2	0	0	2	0	9
Liechtenstein	1	1	0	0	5	1
India	1	1	0	0	3	0
Kyrgyzstan	1	1	0	0	3	1
Iceland	1	1	0	0	2	0
Mexico	1	1	0	0	3	2
Republic of Ireland	1	1	0	0	2	1
South Korea	1	1	0	0	1	0
Japan	1	1	0	0	1	0
New Zealand	1	1	0	0	1	0
Bahrain	1	1	0	0	1	0
Burkina Faso	1	0	1	0	2	2
Ecuador	1	0	1	0	1	1
Peru	1	0	1	0	1	1
Saudi Arabia	1	0	1	0	1	1
Argentina	1	0	1	0	0	0
Gabon	1	0	1	0	0	0
Egypt	1	0	0	1	0	2
Tunisia	1	0	0	1	0	3
Total:	306	93	78	135	346	438

== See also ==
- Belarus national under-23 football team
- Belarus national under-21 football team
- Belarus national under-19 football team
- Belarus national under-17 football team
- Belarus women's national football team
