= David Heindl =

Austrian footballer (born 2004)

Personal information
- Date of birth: 25 June 2004 (age 22)
- Place of birth: Bruck an der Mur, Austria
- Height: 1.90 m (6 ft 3 in)
- Position: Centre-back

Team information
- Current team: Bayern Munich II

Youth career
- 2009–2014: St. Marein
- 2014–2021: Kapfenberger SV

Senior career*
Years	Team	Apps	(Gls)
2021–2025	Kapfenberger SV	85	(11)
2025–	Bayern Munich II	38	(7)

International career^{‡}
2024–	Austria U21	8	(2)
- * Club domestic league appearances and goals as of 3 October 2026 ‡ National team caps and goals as of 27 March 2026

David Heindl (born 25 June 2004) is an Austrian professional footballer who plays as a centre-back for Regionalliga Bayern club Bayern Munich II.

== Club career ==
As a youth player, he played for St. Marein from 2009 until 2014. Following his stint there, he moved to Kapfenberger SV, initially joining the youth academy.

On 1 July 2025, Heindl was transferred to German Bundesliga giants Bayern Munich, initially joining the reserve team ahead of the 2025–26 season.

== International career ==
He has represented Austria at under-21 level since 2024.

== Career statistics ==
=== Club ===
As of match played 3 October 2026

Appearances and goals by club, season and competition
Club	Season	League			Cup (Note: Includes Austrian Cup)		Other		Total	
Club	Season	Division	Apps	Goals	Apps	Goals	Apps	Goals	Apps	Goals
Kapfenberger SV	2021–22	2. Liga	14	0	—		—		14	0
Kapfenberger SV	2022–23	2. Liga	18	2	2	1	—		20	3
Kapfenberger SV	2023–24	2. Liga	28	4	2	0	—		30	4
Kapfenberger SV	2024–25	2. Liga	25	5	2	0	—		27	5
Kapfenberger SV	Total		85	11	6	1	—		91	12
Bayern Munich II	2025–26	Regionalliga Bayern	29	4	—		—		29	4
Bayern Munich II	2026–27	Regionalliga Bayern	9	3	—		—		9	3
Bayern Munich II	Total		38	7	—		—		38	7
Career total			123	18	6	1	0	0	129	19
