= Denis Fedorenko =

Russian footballer

Personal information
- Full name: Denis Sergeyevich Fedorenko
- Date of birth: 11 June 2003 (age 23)
- Height: 1.82 m (6 ft 0 in)
- Position: Midfielder

Team information
- Current team: FC Slavia Mozyr
- Number: 14

Youth career
- –2016: FC Spartak Moscow
- 2016–2020: FC Baltika Kaliningrad

Senior career*
Years	Team	Apps	(Gls)
2020–2021	FC Baltika Kaliningrad	1	(0)
2021	FC Baltika-BFU Kaliningrad	4	(0)
2021–2022	PFC Sochi	0	(0)
2022–2023	FC Baltika-BFU Kaliningrad	0	(0)
2023–2024	FC Yenisey-2 Krasnoyarsk	37	(1)
2024	FC Yenisey Krasnoyarsk	0	(0)
2025	FC Baltika-2 Kaliningrad	2	(0)
2026	FC Naftan Novopolotsk	11	(0)
2026–	FC Slavia Mozyr	8	(0)
- * Club domestic league appearances and goals as of 4 September 2026

Denis Sergeyevich Fedorenko (Russian: Денис Сергеевич Федоренко; born 11 June 2003) is a Russian football player who plays for Slavia Mozyr.

== Club career ==
He made his debut in the Russian Football National League for FC Baltika Kaliningrad on 28 October 2020 in a game against FC Dynamo Bryansk. He substituted Mikhail Markin in the 76th minute.
