= Vladislav Varaksa =

Belarusian footballer

Personal information
- Date of birth: 26 January 2004 (age 22)
- Place of birth: Uzda, Minsk Oblast, Belarus
- Height: 1.78 m (5 ft 10 in)
- Position: Midfielder

Team information
- Current team: BATE Borisov
- Number: 26

Youth career
- 2012–2017: Dinamo Minsk
- 2017–2019: Shakhtyor Soligorsk
- 2019–2020: Dinamo Brest

Senior career*
Years	Team	Apps	(Gls)
2021	Uzda	13	(15)
2021–2024	Neman Grodno	26	(0)
2024	→ Minsk (loan)	4	(1)
2025–2026	Minsk	41	(5)
2026–	BATE Borisov	0	(0)

International career^{‡}
2024–	Belarus U21	4	(0)
- * Club domestic league appearances and goals as of 6 July 2026 ‡ National team caps and goals as of 7 June 2025

Vladislav Varaksa (Belarusian: Уладзіслаў Варакса; Russian: Владислав Варакса; born 26 August 2004) is a Belarusian professional footballer who plays for BATE Borisov.
