= Beijing Urban Construction Group =

Chinese engineering company

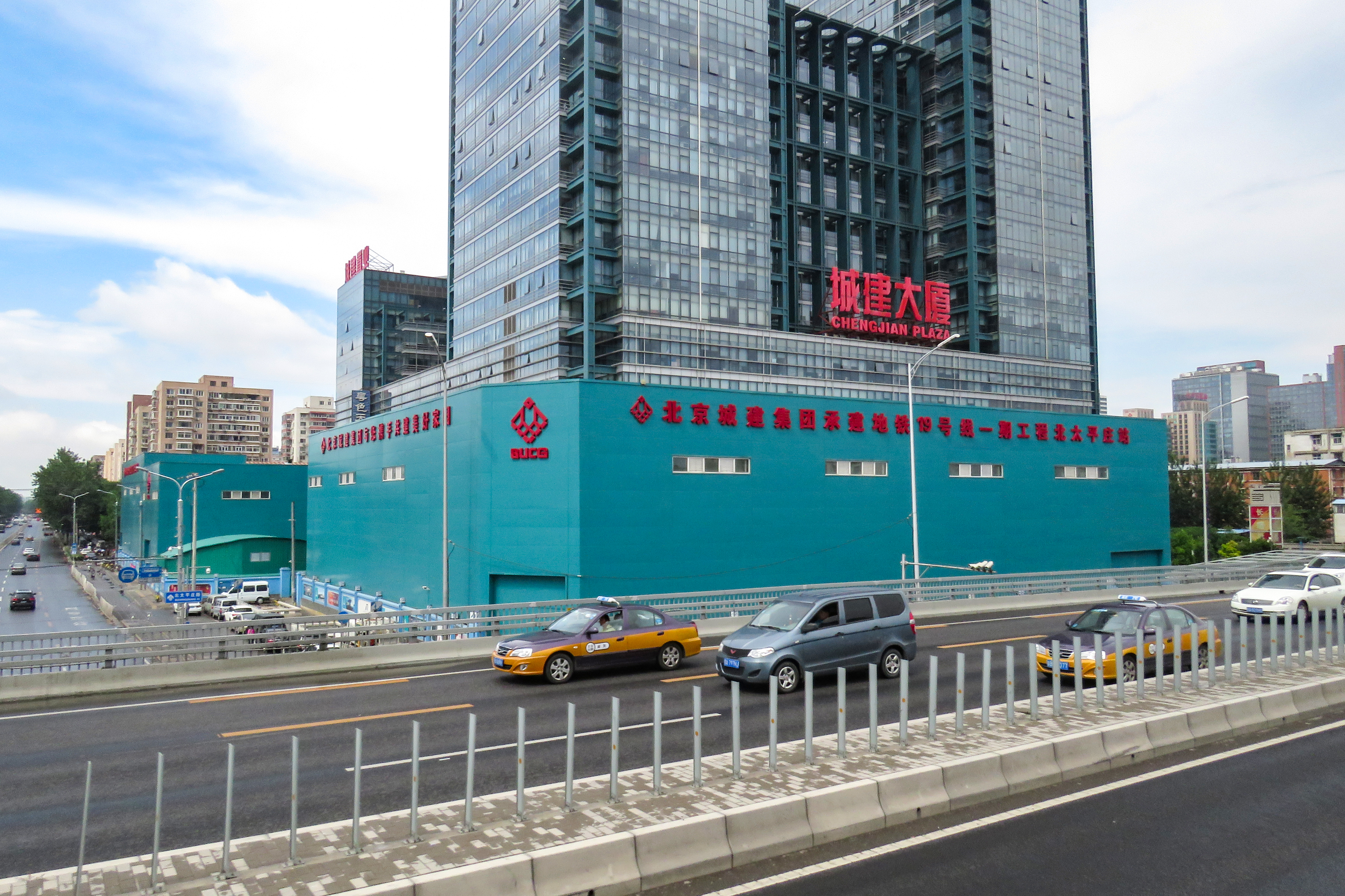
- Native name: 北京城建集团有限责任公司 (Chinese)
- Type: State-owned enterprise
- Headquarters: Beijing, China
- Area served: China, Malaysia, Belarus, Bangladesh

Chinese name
- Simplified Chinese: 北京城建集团有限责任公司
- Traditional Chinese: 北京城建集團股份有限公司
Transcriptions
Standard Mandarin
- Hanyu Pinyin: Běijīng Chéngjiàn Jítuán Yǒuxiàn Zérèn Gōngsī
- Website: bucg.com

Beijing Urban Construction Group (BUCG, Chinese: 北京城建集团有限责任公司) is a Chinese construction contractor. Several of the most recognizable buildings in Beijing including venues of the 2008 Summer Olympics were built by the company. The company has also carried out several projects in Belarus and Bangladesh.

== Subsidiaries ==
One of BUCG's subsidiaries, Yunnan Jingjian Rail Transit, is the operator of Kunming Metro Line 4.

== Belarus ==
The company was chosen as the general contractor to build a football stadium in June 2020. In the same announcement, BUCG's Beijing competitor Beijing Construction Engineering Group was named as the general contractor for a swimming pool meeting international standards.

== Bangladesh ==
In April 2020, the company signed a deal with the Civil Aviation Authority of Bangladesh to construct a new terminal building at Osmani International Airport in Sylhet.
