= Davide Popșa =

Romanian footballer (born 2002)

Personal information
- Date of birth: 4 July 2002 (age 24)
- Place of birth: Crotone, Italy
- Height: 1.85 m (6 ft 1 in)
- Position: Defender

Team information
- Current team: Sighetu Marmației

Youth career
- –2023: CFR Cluj
- 2023–2024: Sepsi OSK

Senior career*
Years	Team	Apps	(Gls)
2024–2025	Sepsi OSK	8	(0)
2025–2026	CSM Olimpia Satu Mare	6	(0)
2026	Isloch	1	(0)
2026–	Sighetu Marmației	0	(0)
- * Club domestic league appearances and goals as of 8 September 2026

Davide Popșa (born 4 July 2002) is a Romanian professional footballer who plays as a defender for Sighetu Marmației.

== Career ==
Popșa made his professional debut for Sepsi OSK against UTA Arad on 27 January 2024.

On 16 March 2026, Popșa signed for Isloch.
