= Kirill Tsepenkov =

Belarusian footballer

Personal information
- Date of birth: 8 July 2004 (age 22)
- Place of birth: Shklov, Mogilev Oblast, Belarus
- Height: 1.70 m (5 ft 7 in)
- Position: Forward

Team information
- Current team: Dnepr Mogilev
- Number: 37

Youth career
- 2019–2020: Dnepr Mogilev

Senior career*
Years	Team	Apps	(Gls)
2020–2021	Rukh Brest	6	(1)
2022–2024	Dynamo Brest	35	(2)
2024	→ Dynamo-2 Brest	4	(2)
2024	Slutsk	15	(5)
2025–2026	Dinamo Minsk	24	(3)
2025	→ Dinamo-2 Minsk	4	(0)
2026–	Dnepr Mogilev	8	(2)

International career^{‡}
2025–	Belarus U21	4	(4)
- * Club domestic league appearances and goals as of 6 September 2026 ‡ National team caps and goals as of 7 June 2025

Kirill Tsepenkov (Belarusian: Кірыл Цапянкоў; Russian: Кирилл Цепенков; born 8 July 2004) is a Belarusian professional footballer who plays for Dnepr Mogilev.
