= Belarus national under-21 football team =

National association football team

Belarus U21
- Association: Football Federation of Belarus
- Confederation: UEFA (Europe)
- Head coach: Vitaliy Pavlov
- Home stadium: Citi Stadium (Borisov)
- FIFA code: BLR
First colours	Second colours

First international
- Moldova 0–1 Belarus (Chişinău, Moldova; 30 August 1992)

Biggest win
- Belarus 10–0 Gibraltar (Zhodino, Belarus; 8 June 2019)

Biggest defeat
- Russia 7–0 Belarus (Moscow, Russia; 31 May 2017); Belarus 0–7 Netherlands (Zhodino, Belarus; 4 September 2020)

UEFA European Under-21 Championship
- Appearances: 3 (first in 2004)
- Best result: Third place (2011)

The Belarus national under-21 football team is the national under-21 football team of Belarus and is controlled by the Football Federation of Belarus. The team competed in the UEFA European Under-21 Championship, held every two years.

== History ==
The team qualified for the final round of the UEFA European Under-21 Championship three times. In 2004 in Germany and 2009 in Sweden the team was unable to advance past group stage.

In 2011 at U21 Euro in Denmark they advanced to semifinal with only one win (against Iceland) and two losses (against Denmark and Switzerland) and having better 3-way head-to-head record against Iceland and Denmark (as all three teams had identical overall results). The team lost 1-3 to Spain. They defeated the Czech Republic 1–0 in the third-place match and qualified for the Men's Football Tournament at the 2012 Summer Olympics.

After the 2022 Russian invasion of Ukraine, UEFA banned Belarus from hosting international competitions.

== European Championship record ==
UEFA European Under-21 Championship record
Year	Round	Position	Pld	W	D	L	GF	GA
1976–1992	Part of the Soviet Union							
(France) 1994	Did not enter							
(Spain) 1996	Did not qualify							
(Romania) 1998	Did not qualify							
(Slovakia) 2000	Did not qualify							
(Switzerland) 2002	Did not qualify							
(Germany) 2004	Group stage	5th	3	1	1	1	4	4
(Portugal) 2006	Did not qualify							
(Netherlands) 2007	Did not qualify							
(Sweden) 2009	Group stage	7th	3	0	1	2	2	7
(Denmark) 2011	Third place	3rd	5	2	0	3	5	8
(Israel) 2013	Did not qualify							
(Czech Republic) 2015	Did not qualify							
(Poland) 2017	Did not qualify							
(Italy) (San Marino) 2019	Did not qualify							
(Hungary) (Slovenia) 2021	Did not qualify							
(Georgia (country)) (Romania) 2023	Did not qualify							
(Slovakia) 2025	Did not qualify							
(Albania) (Serbia) 2027	Did not qualify							
Total	Third place	3/18	11	3	2	6	11	19

=== UEFA U21 Euro 2027 qualification ===
Pos	Team	Pld	W	D	L	GF	GA	GD	Pts	Qualification	Belgium	Denmark	Austria	Wales	Belarus
1	Belgium	8	5	2	1	13	2	+11	17	Final tournament	—	2–0	1–0	1–0	1–0
2	Denmark	8	4	3	1	15	6	+9	15	Play-offs	0–0	—	1–1	4–0	2–0
3	Austria	8	4	2	2	15	9	+6	14		1–0	1–1	—	0–2	2–1
4	Wales	8	2	0	6	7	28	−21	6		0–7	2–6	1–7	—	2–0
5	Belarus	8	1	1	6	7	12	−5	4		1–1	0–1	2–3	3–0	—

Source: UEFA
Rules for classification: Tiebreakers

== Current squad ==
The following players were called up for friendly matches against Azerbaijan and China on 4 and 7 June 2025.

Caps and goals are correct as of 7 June 2025, after the match against China.

No.	Pos.	Player	Date of birth (age)	Caps	Goals	Club
	GK	Arseniy Skopets	10 June 2005 (age 21)	6	0	(Football Federation of Belarus) BATE Borisov
	GK	Artyom Karatay	24 March 2004 (age 22)	4	0	(Football Federation of Belarus) Dinamo Minsk
	GK	Ivan Shimakovich	13 February 2005 (age 21)	3	0	(Football Federation of Belarus) Dinamo Minsk
	DF	Nikita Baranok	31 March 2004 (age 22)	17	3	(Football Federation of Belarus) Maxline Vitebsk
	DF	Vadim Martinkevich	10 April 2004 (age 22)	9	0	(Football Federation of Belarus) Gomel
	DF	Kirill Gomanov	17 February 2005 (age 21)	7	0	(Football Federation of Belarus) Isloch Minsk Raion
	DF	Vladislav Melko	19 July 2004 (age 22)	5	0	(Football Federation of Belarus) Torpedo-BelAZ Zhodino
	DF	Ilya Dubinets	22 June 2004 (age 22)	4	1	(Football Federation of Belarus) Minsk
	DF	Vasiliy Chernyavskiy	14 June 2006 (age 20)	4	0	(Football Federation of Belarus) Slutsk
	DF	Maksim Burko	23 January 2004 (age 22)	3	0	(Russian Football Union) KAMAZ Naberezhnye Chelny
	DF	Matvey Bokhno	14 October 2007 (age 19)	2	0	(Polish Football Association) Lech Poznań
	MF	Daniil Dushevskiy	1 March 2004 (age 22)	19	1	(Football Association of Serbia) Mladost Novi Sad
	MF	Rodion Pechura	24 March 2004 (age 22)	13	2	(Russian Football Union) Kuban Krasnodar
	MF	Artur Nazarenko	10 February 2004 (age 22)	10	0	(Football Federation of Belarus) Neman Grodno
	MF	Ruslan Myalkovskiy	7 May 2006 (age 20)	8	2	(Football Federation of Belarus) Arsenal Dzerzhinsk
	MF	Timofey Sharkovskiy	4 February 2004 (age 22)	5	0	(Football Federation of Belarus) Torpedo-BelAZ Zhodino
	MF	Kirill Tsepenkov	8 July 2004 (age 22)	4	4	(Football Federation of Belarus) Dinamo Minsk
	MF	Yevgeniy Novykh	14 August 2006 (age 20)	4	0	(Football Federation of Belarus) Vitebsk
	MF	Gleb Kuchko	3 June 2005 (age 21)	4	0	(Polish Football Association) Wisła Płock
	MF	Vladislav Varaksa	26 January 2004 (age 22)	4	0	(Football Federation of Belarus) Minsk
	MF	Andrey Denisyuk	26 March 2005 (age 21)	2	1	(Football Federation of Belarus) Minsk
	MF	Egor Prokopenko	7 September 2006 (age 20)	1	0	(Royal Spanish Football Federation) Cerdanyola del Vallès
	FW	Artyom Shumansky	25 November 2004 (age 21)	13	2	(Russian Football Union) CSKA Moscow
	FW	Timofey Simanenka	27 November 2006 (age 19)	4	0	(Football Federation of Belarus) Minsk

=== Recent call-ups ===
The following players have also been called up within the last twelve months and remain eligible for selection.

Pos.	Player	Date of birth (age)	Caps	Goals	Club	Latest call-up

== See also ==
- Belarus national football team
- Belarus national under-23 football team
- Belarus national under-19 football team
- Belarus national under-17 football team
